= 2020–21 FC Lorient season =

FC Lorient
2020–21 season
- Chairman: Loïc Fery
- Manager: Christophe Pélissier
- Stadium: Stade du Moustoir
- Ligue 1: 16th
- Coupe de France: Round of 32
- Top goalscorer: League: Terem Moffi (14); All: Terem Moffi (15)
- Biggest win: Lorient 3–0 Nîmes; Lorient 4–1 Bordeaux
- Biggest defeat: Lille 4–0 Lorient
Home colours	Away colours	Third colours

The 2020–21 season was Football Club Lorient's 95th season in existence and the club's first season back in the top flight of French football. In addition to the domestic league, Lorient participated in this season's edition of the Coupe de France. The season covered the period from 1 July 2020 to 30 June 2021.

== Players ==
=== First-team squad ===
Note: Flags indicate national team as defined under FIFA eligibility rules; some limited exceptions apply. Players may hold more than one non-FIFA nationality.

No.	Pos.	Nation	Player
1	GK	FRA	Matthieu Dreyer
2	DF	GLP	Andreaw Gravillon (on loan from Inter)
4	DF	POR	Tiago Ilori (on loan from Sporting CP)
5	DF	MAD	Thomas Fontaine
6	MF	FRA	Laurent Abergel
7	FW	CIV	Stéphane Diarra
8	MF	ENG	Trevoh Chalobah (on loan from Chelsea)
10	MF	FRA	Enzo Le Fée
11	MF	FRA	Quentin Boisgard
12	MF	FRA	Sylvain Marveaux
13	FW	NGR	Terem Moffi
14	DF	FRA	Jérôme Hergault
15	DF	FRA	Julien Laporte
16	GK	FRA	Teddy Bartouche
17	DF	FRA	Houboulang Mendes

No.	Pos.	Nation	Player
18	MF	FRA	Fabien Lemoine (captain)
19	FW	COD	Yoane Wissa
20	DF	FRA	Matthieu Saunier
21	DF	MAD	Jérémy Morel
22	MF	FRA	Jonathan Delaplace
23	MF	FRA	Thomas Monconduit
24	MF	CMR	Franklin Wadja
25	DF	FRA	Vincent Le Goff
27	FW	AUT	Adrian Grbić
28	FW	FRA	Armand Laurienté
29	FW	FRA	Pierre-Yves Hamel
30	GK	FRA	Paul Nardi
40	GK	FRA	Thomas Callens
31	DF	FRA	Yoann Étienne
—	DF	TOG	Josué Homawoo

=== Out on loan ===
Note: Flags indicate national team as defined under FIFA eligibility rules; some limited exceptions apply. Players may hold more than one non-FIFA nationality.

No.	Pos.	Nation	Player
—	GK	FRA	Maxime Pattier (on loan at Saint-Brieuc)
—	DF	FRA	Quentin Lecoeuche (on loan at Ajaccio)
—	DF	FRA	Tom Renaud (on loan at Cholet)

No.	Pos.	Nation	Player
—	MF	FRA	Julien Ponceau (on loan at Rodez)
—	FW	FRA	Junior Burban (on loan at Saint-Priest)
—	FW	FRA	Samuel Loric (on loan at Avranches)
—	FW	TUR	Umut Bozok (on loan at Troyes)

== Transfers ==
=== In ===
No.	Pos	Player	Transferred from	Fee	Date	Source
27	FW	(Austria) Adrian Grbić	(France) Clermont	€9,000,000	9 July 2020	

=== Out ===
No.	Pos	Player	Transferred to	Fee	Date	Source
15	GK	(France) Illan Meslier	(England) Leeds United	5,000,000	23 July 2020	

== Pre-season and friendlies ==
Win Draw Loss

18 July 2020 Friendly	Lorient	1–0	Concarneau	Ploemeur, France
11:00 CEST (UTC+2)		Report		Stadium: Complexe Sportif Espace FCL

25 July 2020 Friendly	Lorient	Cancelled	US Avranches	Sarzeau, France
17:00 CEST (UTC+2)		Report		Stadium: Sarzeau Football Club

31 July 2020 Friendly	Lorient	2–2	Brest	Lorient, France
17:00 CEST (UTC+2)	Bozok 74' (pen.); Boisgard 78'	Report	Chardonnet 23'; Cardona 35'	Stadium: Stade du Moustoir

4 August 2020 Friendly	Lorient	1–1	Rennes	Lorient, France
18:00 CEST (UTC+2)	Diarra 10'	Report	Martin 86' (pen.); Traoré (yellow card) 90+2'	Stadium: Stade du Moustoir; Attendance: 0 Referee: Mikael Lesage

8 August 2020 Friendly	Lorient	0–0	Angers	Lorient, France
18:00 CEST (UTC+2)		Report		Stadium: Stade du Moustoir

15 August 2020 Friendly	Lorient	1–0	Guingamp	Lorient, France
15:00 CEST (UTC+2)	Bozok 77'	Report		Stadium: Stade du Moustoir

5 September 2020 Friendly	Lorient	3–1	Niort	Sarzeau, France
15:00 CEST (UTC+2)	Monconduit 27'; Wissa 37'; Marveaux 43'		Koyalipou 54'

9 October 2020 Friendly	Rennes	2–0	Lorient	Rennes, France
16:00 CEST (UTC+2)	Bourigeaud 13' (pen.); Gboho 16'	Report		Stadium: Roazhon Park; Attendance: 0 Referee: Bartolomeu Varela

== Competitions ==
=== Overall record ===
Competition	First match	Last match	Starting round	Final position	Record							
Competition	First match	Last match	Starting round	Final position	Pld	W	D	L	GF	GA	GD	Win %
Ligue 1	23 August 2020	23 May 2021	Matchday 1	16th	38	11	9	18	50	68	−18	28.95
Coupe de France	9 February 2021	6 March 2021	Round of 64	Round of 32	2	1	0	1	2	2	+0	50.00
Total					40	12	9	19	52	70	−18	30.00

Source: Soccerway

=== Ligue 1 ===
==== League table ====
Pos	Team	Pld	W	D	L	GF	GA	GD	Pts	Qualification or relegation
14	Reims	38	9	15	14	42	50	−8	42	
15	Strasbourg	38	11	9	18	49	58	−9	42	
16	Lorient	38	11	9	18	50	68	−18	42	
17	Brest	38	11	8	19	50	66	−16	41	
18	Nantes (O)	38	9	13	16	47	55	−8	40	Qualification for the Relegation play-offs

Source: Ligue 1
Rules for classification: 1) Points; 2) Goal difference; 3) Goals scored; 4) Head-to-head goal difference; 5) Fairplay ranking.
(O) Play-off winners

==== Results summary ====
Overall								Home						Away					
Pld	W	D	L	GF	GA	GD	Pts	W	D	L	GF	GA	GD	W	D	L	GF	GA	GD
38	11	9	18	50	68	−18	42	10	2	7	31	29	+2	1	7	11	19	39	−20

Source: Ligue 1

==== Results by round ====
Round	1	2	3	4	5	6	7	8	9	10	11	12	13	14	15	16	17	18	19	20	21	22	23	24	25	26	27	28	29	30	31	32	33	34	35	36	37	38
Ground	H	A	H	A	H	A	A	H	A	H	A	H	A	H	A	H	A	H	A	H	A	H	A	H	A	H	H	A	H	A	H	A	A	H	H	A	H	A
Result	W	L	L	L	D	L	W	L	D	L	L	L	L	W	L	L	D	L	L	W	L	W	D	W	D	L	W	D	D	D	W	L	L	W	W	L	W	D
Position	2	11	14	16	16	17	17	17	16	17	18	18	19	17	18	19	18	19	19	20	20	18	18	17	17	19	17	17	17	17	17	17	17	17	17	17	17	16

Source: Ligue 1
A = Away; H = Home; W = Win; D = Draw; L = Loss

==== Matches ====
The league fixtures were announced on 9 July 2020.

23 August 2020 1	Lorient	3–1	Strasbourg	Lorient
15:00 CEST (UTC+2)	Wissa 51'; Grbić 60' (pen.); Boisgard (yellow card) 69'; Wadja (yellow card) 72'; Laporte (yellow card) 79'; Hamel 87'	Report	Chahiri 30'; Simakan (yellow card) 37'; Carole (yellow card) 82'	Stadium: Stade du Moustoir; Referee: Johan Hamel

30 August 2020 2	Saint-Étienne	2–0	Lorient	Saint-Étienne
15:00 CEST (UTC+2)	Hamouma 19', 51'; Neyou (yellow card) 27'; Fofana (yellow card) 78'	Report	Le Fée (yellow card) 28'	Stadium: Stade Geoffroy-Guichard; Referee: Florent Batta

13 September 2020 3	Lorient	2–3	Lens	Lorient
15:00 CEST (UTC+2)	Boisgard (yellow card) 6'; Grbić 14'; Laporte (yellow card) 30'; Diarra (yellow card) 45'; Le Fée (yellow card) 65'; Wissa 90+2' (pen.)	Report	Kakuta 31' (pen.); Medina 34'; Cahuzac (yellow card) 49'; Ganago 63'; Badé (yellow card) 79' (yellow-red card) 90+1'	Stadium: Stade du Moustoir; Referee: Aurélien Petit

20 September 2020 4	Brest	3–2	Lorient	Brest
15:00 CEST (UTC+2)	Belkebla (yellow card) 4'; Perraud 30'; Mounié 32'; Honorat 62'; Mbock (yellow card) 73'	Report	Hérelle 34' (o.g.); Hamel (yellow card) 85'; Monconduit 90+1'	Stadium: Stade Francis-Le Blé; Referee: Karim Abed

27 September 2020 5	Lorient	1–1	Lyon	Lorient
17:00 CEST (UTC+2)	Hamel (yellow card) 54'; Wissa 63'; Nardi (yellow card) 90+5'	Report	Dubois 74'	Stadium: Stade du Moustoir; Referee: Clément Turpin

4 October 2020 6	Metz	3–1	Lorient	Metz
15:00 CEST (UTC+2)	Angban (yellow card) 40'; Niane 44' (pen.), 59', 64'	Report	Hamel 36'; Abergel (yellow card) 52'; Wissa (yellow card) 86'	Stadium: Stade Saint-Symphorien; Referee: Jérôme Miguelgorry

17 October 2020 7	Reims	1–3	Lorient	Reims
17:00 CEST (UTC+2)	Cassamá 15', (red card) 70'; Chavalerin (yellow card) 19'; Ekitike (yellow card) 45+1'; Drammeh (yellow card) 48'; Faes (yellow card) 54'; Donis (red card) 90'	Report	Hamel (yellow card) 34', (goal) 61'; Wissa 64' (pen.); Moffi 80'	Stadium: Stade Auguste-Delaune; Referee: Mikael Lesage

24 October 2020 8	Lorient	0–1	Marseille	Lorient
17:00 CEST (UTC+2)	Boisgard (yellow card) 19'; Mendes (yellow card) 53'; Gravillon (yellow card) 73'	Report	Benedetto (yellow card) 36'; Balerdi 53'; Álvaro (yellow card) 55'; Rongier (yellow card) 72'	Stadium: Stade du Moustoir; Referee: Benoît Bastien

1 November 2020 9	Dijon	0–0	Lorient	Dijon
15:00 CET (UTC+1)	Boey (yellow card) 41'; Allagbé (yellow card) 54'	Report	Wissa (penalty missed) 57'; Lemoine (yellow card) 79'	Stadium: Stade Gaston Gérard; Attendance: 0 Referee: Aurélien Petit

8 November 2020 10	Lorient	0–2	Nantes	Lorient
15:00 CET (UTC+1)	Abergel (yellow card) 18'; Laurienté (yellow card) 19'; Morel (yellow card) 82'	Report	Louza (yellow card) 32'; Bamba 80'; Blas 84'	Stadium: Stade du Moustoir; Attendance: 0 Referee: Stéphanie Frappart

22 November 2020 11	Lille	4–0	Lorient	Villeneuve-d'Ascq
21:00 CET (UTC+1)	Yazıcı 29', 51'; Xeka (yellow card) 37'; Luiz Araújo 57'; David 90'	Report	Wissa (yellow card) 32'; Mendes (yellow card) 45+2'; Lemoine (yellow card) 79'	Stadium: Stade Pierre-Mauroy; Attendance: 0 Referee: Willy Delajod

29 November 2020 12	Lorient	0–1	Montpellier	Lorient
15:00 CET (UTC+1)	Laporte (yellow card) 48'; Le Fée (yellow card) 52'	Report	Savanier (penalty missed) 45+2', (yellow card) 90'; Škuletić 79'	Stadium: Stade du Moustoir; Attendance: 0 Referee: Bastien Dechepy

6 December 2020 13	Angers	2–0	Lorient	Angers
15:00 CET (UTC+1)	Fulgini 10'; Amadou (yellow card) 21'; Boufal (yellow card) 40'; Bahoken (yellow card) 45+1'; Capelle 90+6'	Report		Stadium: Stade Raymond Kopa; Attendance: 0 Referee: Thomas Léonard

13 December 2020 14	Lorient	3–0	Nîmes	Lorient
15:00 CET (UTC+1)	Boisgard 2'; Laurienté (yellow card) 19'; Hamel 29' (pen.); Gravillon (yellow card) 55'; Wissa 90'	Report		Stadium: Stade du Moustoir; Attendance: 0 Referee: Karim Abed

16 December 2020 15	Paris Saint-Germain	2–0	Lorient	Paris
21:00 CET (UTC+1)	Mbappé (yellow card) 34', (goal) 51' (pen.); Kean (yellow card) 58', (goal) 60'; Fadiga (yellow card) 87'	Report	Gravillon (red card) 49'	Stadium: Parc des Princes; Attendance: 0 Referee: Johan Hamel

20 December 2020 16	Lorient	0–3	Rennes	Lorient
17:00 CET (UTC+1)	Delaplace (yellow card) 74'	Report	Da Silva 23'; Maouassa (yellow card) 48'; Truffert (yellow card) 66'; Bourigeaud 70'; Terrier 76'	Stadium: Stade du Moustoir; Attendance: 0 Referee: Eric Wattellier

23 December 2020 17	Nice	2–2	Lorient	Nice
19:00 CET (UTC+1)	Lotomba 18', (yellow card) 90'; Reine-Adélaïde 34', (yellow card) 90+2'; Boudaoui (yellow card) 73'; Bambu (red card) 81'	Report	Laporte (yellow card) 38'; Monconduit (yellow card) 44'; Lemoine (yellow card) 45+1'; Moffi 49'; Grbić 82' (pen.); Le Fée (yellow card) 90+2'	Stadium: Allianz Riviera; Attendance: 0 Referee: Aurélien Petit

6 January 2021 18	Lorient	2–5	Monaco	Lorient
19:00 CET (UTC+1)	Moffi 31'; Laurienté (yellow card) 34'; Delaplace (red card) 48'; Gravillon 67'	Report	Sidibé (yellow card) 3'; Martins (yellow card) 6'; Disasi 9'; Golovin 64'; Diop (yellow card) 66', (goal) 78'; Volland 68'; Maripán 89'	Stadium: Stade du Moustoir; Attendance: 0 Referee: Frank Schneider

9 January 2021 19	Bordeaux	2–1	Lorient	Bordeaux
21:00 CET (UTC+1)	Oudin 13', 43'; Hwang (yellow card) 41'; Baysse (yellow card) 90'	Report	Moffi 23'	Stadium: Matmut Atlantique; Attendance: 0 Referee: Willy Delajod

27 January 2021 20	Lorient	3–2	Dijon	Lorient
21:00 CET (UTC+1)	Chalobah 30', (yellow card) 90+2'; Moffi 58'; Etienne (yellow card) 65'; Racioppi 90+5' (o.g.)	Report	Baldé (yellow card) 10', (goal) 42'; Konaté (yellow card) 26'; Ecuele Manga 40'; Ndong (yellow card) 73'	Stadium: Stade du Moustoir; Attendance: 0 Referee: Bastien Dechepy
Note: The match originally scheduled for 17 January 2021, but postponed after more than ten Lorient players tested positive for COVID-19.

31 January 2021 22	Lorient	3–2	Paris Saint-Germain	Lorient
15:00 CET (UTC+1)	Le Fée (yellow card) 12'; Monconduit (yellow card) 28'; Abergel 36', (yellow card) 90'; Lemoine (yellow card) 72'; Wissa 80'; Moffi 90+1'	Report	Pereira (yellow card) 2'; Neymar 45' (pen.), 58' (pen.); Paredes (yellow card) 75'	Stadium: Stade du Moustoir; Attendance: 0 Referee: Jérémy Stinat

3 February 2021 23	Rennes	1–1	Lorient	Rennes
19:00 CET (UTC+1)	Terrier 14'; Soppy (yellow card) 79'; Martin (yellow card) 90'	Report	Boisgard 83'; Chalobah (yellow card) 87'	Stadium: Roazhon Park; Attendance: 0 Referee: Hakim Ben El Hadj

6 February 2021 24	Lorient	1–0	Reims	Lorient
17:00 CET (UTC+1)	Abergel 53'	Report	Kutesa (yellow card) 27'; Mbuku (yellow card) 74'; De Smet (yellow card) 87'; Chavalerin (yellow card) 90+5'	Stadium: Stade du Moustoir; Attendance: 0 Referee: Thomas Léonard

14 February 2021 25	Monaco	2–2	Lorient	Monaco
13:00 CET (UTC+1)	Lecomte (yellow card) 6'; Diop (yellow card) 39'; Tchouaméni (yellow card) 45'; Ben Yedder 48' (pen.), 90+3'	Report	Moffi 7' (pen.), 62'; Mendes (yellow card) 35'; Dreyer (yellow card) 88'; Chalobah (yellow card) 90+1'	Stadium: Stade Louis II; Attendance: 0 Referee: Benoît Millot

21 February 2021 26	Lorient	1–4	Lille	Lorient
17:00 CET (UTC+1)	Hergault 23'; Lemoine (yellow card) 61'; Monconduit (yellow card) 70'	Report	Gravillon 21' (o.g.); Fonte 38'; Ikoné 59'; Bradarić 90+1'	Stadium: Stade du Moustoir; Attendance: 0 Referee: Johan Hamel

24 February 2021 21	Nîmes	1–0	Lorient	Nîmes
19:00 CET (UTC+1)	Guessoum (yellow card) 65'; Ripart 88' (pen.); Reynet (yellow card) 89'	Report	Moffi (yellow card) 39'; Boisgard (yellow card) 61'; Grbić (yellow card) 90+1'; Laporte (yellow card) 90+3'	Stadium: Stade des Costières; Attendance: 0 Referee: Mikael Lesage
Note: The match originally scheduled for 24 January 2021, but postponed after more than ten Lorient players tested positive for COVID-19.

28 February 2021 27	Lorient	2–1	Saint-Étienne	Lorient
15:00 CET (UTC+1)	Chalobah (yellow card) 48'; Laurienté 66', 86'	Report	Moukoudi 14'; Debuchy (yellow card) 56'; Moueffek (yellow card) 73'; Gourna-Douath (yellow card) 84'	Stadium: Stade du Moustoir; Attendance: 0 Referee: Stéphanie Frappart

3 March 2021 28	Montpellier	1–1	Lorient	Montpellier
21:00 CET (UTC+1)	Mavididi 28'; Ferri (yellow card) 60'; Mendes (yellow card) 69'	Report	Grbić 9' (pen.); Lemoine (yellow card) 35'; Chalobah (yellow card) 62'; Gravillon (yellow card) 86'	Stadium: Stade de la Mosson; Attendance: 0 Referee: Benoît Bastien

14 March 2021 29	Lorient	1–1	Nice	Lorient
15:00 CET (UTC+1)	Boisgard (yellow card) 3'; Wissa 66'; Abergel (yellow card) 73'	Report	Kamara (yellow card) 42'; Maolida 58'; Schneiderlin (yellow card) 73'	Stadium: Stade du Moustoir; Attendance: 0 Referee: Ruddy Buquet

21 March 2021 30	Nantes	1–1	Lorient	Nantes
15:00 CET (UTC+1)	Kolo Muani 2'	Report	Laurienté (yellow card) 24', (goal) 87'	Stadium: Stade de la Beaujoire; Attendance: 0 Referee: Antony Gautier

4 April 2021 31	Lorient	1–0	Brest	Lorient
15:00 CEST (UTC+2)	Abergel (yellow card) 20', (goal) 45'; Monconduit (yellow card) 78'; Hamel (yellow card) 88'	Report	Mounié (yellow card) 52'; Brassier (yellow card) 85'; Belkebla (red card) 90+3'	Stadium: Stade du Moustoir; Attendance: 0 Referee: Bastien Dechepy

11 April 2021 32	Lens	4–1	Lorient	Lens
15:00 CEST (UTC+2)	Kakuta 16' (pen.); Jean 39'; Kalimuendo 55'; Banza 88' (pen.)	Report	Moffi 29'	Stadium: Stade Bollaert-Delelis; Attendance: 0 Referee: Eric Wattellier

17 April 2021 33	Marseille	3–2	Lorient	Marseille
17:00 CEST (UTC+2)	Balerdi (yellow card) 39'; Payet 53'; Lirola 56', 90+1'	Report	Moffi 19', 70'	Stadium: Stade Vélodrome; Attendance: 0 Referee: Hakim Ben El Hadj

25 April 2021 34	Lorient	4–1	Bordeaux	Lorient
15:00 CEST (UTC+2)	Lemoine (yellow card) 7'; Wissa 18'; Moffi 20', 43', 80', (yellow card) 81'	Report	Baysse (yellow card) 13'; Sabaly (yellow card) 75'; Sissokho 83', (yellow card) 87'	Stadium: Stade du Moustoir; Attendance: 0 Referee: Jérémie Pignard

2 May 2021 35	Lorient	2–0	Angers	Lorient
15:00 CEST (UTC+2)	Laporte (yellow card) 28' (yellow-red card) 50'; Wissa 44' (pen.); Lemoine 47'; Le Fée (yellow card) 65'	Report	Coulibaly (red card) 15'; Manceau (yellow card) 43'; Pereira Lage (yellow card) 46'; Pavlović (yellow card) 90+2'	Stadium: Stade du Moustoir; Attendance: 0 Referee: Willy Delajod

8 May 2021 36	Lyon	4–1	Lorient	Décines-Charpieu
17:00 CEST (UTC+2)	Bruno Guimarães (yellow card) 18', (goal) 71' (pen.), 77'; Aouar (yellow card) 41', (goal) 53'; Paquetá 65'	Report	Lemoine (yellow card) 69'; Hamel (yellow card) 79'; Monconduit 83'	Stadium: Parc Olympique Lyonnais; Attendance: 0 Referee: Mikael Lesage

16 May 2021 37	Lorient	2–1	Metz	Lorient
21:00 CEST (UTC+2)	Wissa 31' (pen.); Hergault 74'; Grbić (yellow card) 90+1'	Report	Kouyaté (yellow card) 23'; Bronn (yellow card) 30'; Ambrose (yellow card) 65'; Traoré 72'; Centonze (yellow card) 84'	Stadium: Stade du Moustoir; Attendance: 0 Referee: Florent Batta

23 May 2021 38	Strasbourg	1–1	Lorient	Strasbourg
21:00 CEST (UTC+2)	Carole (yellow card) 10'; Diallo 18'	Report	Laporte (yellow card) 53'; Chalobah 55'	Stadium: Stade de la Meinau; Attendance: 0 Referee: Stéphanie Frappart

=== Coupe de France ===
9 February 2021 Round of 64	Lorient	2–1	Paris FC	Lorient
18:30 CET (UTC+1)	Hamel (yellow card) 59'; Wissa 72' (pen.); Moffi 83'	Report	Name 13'	Stadium: Stade du Moustoir; Attendance: 0 Referee: Eric Wattellier

6 March 2021 Round of 32	Le Puy Foot 43 Auvergne	1–0	Lorient	Le Puy-en-Velay
16:30 CET (UTC+1)	Joseph 61'	Report		Stadium: Stade Charles Massot; Attendance: 0 Referee: Franck Schneider

== Statistics ==
=== Goalscorers ===
As of 21 February 2021

Rank	No.	Pos	Nat	Name	Ligue 1	Coupe de France	Total
1	13	FW	(Nigeria)	Terem Moffi	8	1	9
2	19	FW	(Democratic Republic of the Congo)	Yoane Wissa	6	1	7
3	29	FW	(France)	Pierre-Yves Hamel	4	0	4
4	27	FW	(Austria)	Adrian Grbić	3	0	3
5	6	MF	(France)	Laurent Abergel	2	0	2
5	11	MF	(France)	Quentin Boisgard	2	0	2
5	2	DF	(Guadeloupe)	Andreaw Gravillon	2	0	2
8	8	MF	(England)	Trevoh Chalobah	1	0	1
8	14	DF	(France)	Jérôme Hergault	1	0	1
8	23	MF	(France)	Thomas Monconduit	1	0	1
Own goal					1	0	1
Totals					31	2	33
