= 2021–22 FC Lorient season =

FC Lorient
2021–22 season
- President: Loïc Fery
- Head coach: Christophe Pélissier
- Stadium: Stade du Moustoir
- Ligue 1: 16th
- Coupe de France: Round of 64
- Top goalscorer: League: Terem Moffi (8); All: Terem Moffi (8)
Home colours	Away colours	Third colours

The 2021–22 season was the 96th season in the existence of FC Lorient and the club's second consecutive season in the top flight of French football. In addition to the domestic league, Lorient participated in this season's edition of the Coupe de France.

== Players ==
=== First-team squad ===
Note: Flags indicate national team as defined under FIFA eligibility rules; some limited exceptions apply. Players may hold more than one non-FIFA nationality.

No.	Pos.	Nation	Player
1	GK	FRA	Matthieu Dreyer
2	DF	BRA	Igor Silva
3	DF	GER	Moritz Jenz
6	MF	FRA	Laurent Abergel (vice-captain)
7	FW	CIV	Stéphane Diarra
8	MF	NGR	Bonke Innocent
9	FW	MLI	Ibrahima Koné
10	MF	FRA	Enzo Le Fée
11	MF	FRA	Quentin Boisgard
13	FW	NGR	Terem Moffi
14	DF	FRA	Jérôme Hergault
15	DF	FRA	Julien Laporte
16	GK	FRA	Teddy Bartouche

No.	Pos.	Nation	Player
17	DF	GBS	Houboulang Mendes
18	MF	FRA	Fabien Lemoine (captain)
19	DF	FRA	Léo Pétrot
20	DF	FRA	Samuel Loric
21	DF	MAD	Jérémy Morel
23	MF	FRA	Thomas Monconduit
25	DF	FRA	Vincent Le Goff
28	FW	FRA	Armand Laurienté
30	GK	FRA	Paul Nardi
31	FW	FRA	Redwan Bourlès
32	FW	SEN	Sambou Soumano
38	FW	BFA	Dango Ouattara
40	GK	FRA	Thomas Callens

=== Out on loan ===
Note: Flags indicate national team as defined under FIFA eligibility rules; some limited exceptions apply. Players may hold more than one non-FIFA nationality.

No.	Pos.	Nation	Player
—	DF	FRA	Julien Ponceau (on loan to Nîmes)
—	DF	FRA	Tom Renaud (on loan to Cholet)
—	DF	FRA	Loris Mouyokolo (on loan to Bourg-en-Bresse)
—	FW	NGR	Taofeek Ismaheel (on loan to Vålerenga)

No.	Pos.	Nation	Player
—	FW	TUR	Umut Bozok (on loan to Kasımpaşa)
—	FW	FRA	Pierre-Yves Hamel (on loan to Clermont Foot)
—	FW	AUT	Adrian Grbić (on loan to SBV Vitesse)

== Pre-season and friendlies ==
Win Draw Loss

17 July 2021 Friendly	Brest	2–3	Lorient	France
17:30 CEST (UTC+2)

24 July 2021 Friendly	Lorient	1–1	Bordeaux	Pontivy, France
17:00 CEST (UTC+2)	Boisgard 67'		Oudin 60'	Stadium: Stade Du Faubourg de Verdun

28 July 2021 Friendly	Nantes	0–1	Lorient	France
18:00 CEST (UTC+2)			Loric 79'

31 July 2021 Friendly	Lorient	1–0	Angers	Lorient, France
15:00 CEST (UTC+2)	Moffi 67'			Stadium: Stade du Moustoir

== Competitions ==
=== Overall record ===
Competition	First match	Last match	Starting round	Final position	Record							
Competition	First match	Last match	Starting round	Final position	Pld	W	D	L	GF	GA	GD	Win %
Ligue 1	8 August 2021	21 May 2022	Matchday 1	16th	38	8	12	18	35	63	−28	21.05
Coupe de France	18 December 2021		Round of 64	Round of 64	1	0	0	1	0	1	−1	0.00
Total					39	8	12	19	35	64	−29	20.51

Source: Soccerway

=== Ligue 1 ===
==== League table ====
Pos	Team	Pld	W	D	L	GF	GA	GD	Pts	Qualification or relegation
14	Angers	38	10	11	17	44	55	−11	41	
15	Troyes	38	9	11	18	37	53	−16	38	
16	Lorient	38	8	12	18	35	63	−28	36	
17	Clermont	38	9	9	20	38	69	−31	36	
18	Saint-Étienne (R)	38	7	11	20	42	77	−35	32	Qualification for the relegation play-offs

Source: Ligue 1
Rules for classification: 1) Points; 2) Goal difference; 3) Head-to-head points; 4) Head-to-head goal difference; 5) Head-to-head goals scored; 6) Head-to-head away goals scored; 7) Goals scored; 8) Away goals scored; 9) Fair-play points (Note: Head-to-head record is used only after all the matches between the teams in question have been played).
(R) Relegated

==== Results summary ====
Overall								Home						Away					
Pld	W	D	L	GF	GA	GD	Pts	W	D	L	GF	GA	GD	W	D	L	GF	GA	GD
38	8	12	18	35	63	−28	36	6	6	7	20	22	−2	2	6	11	15	41	−26

Source: Ligue 1

==== Results by round ====
Round	1	2	3	4	5	6	7	8	9	10	11	12	13	14	15	16	17	18	19	20	21	22	23	24	25	26	27	28	29	30	31	32	33	34	35	36	37	38
Ground	A	H	A	A	H	A	H	A	H	A	H	A	H	A	H	A	H	A	H	A	H	A	H	A	H	A	H	A	H	A	H	A	H	A	H	H	A	H
Result	D	W	L	D	W	D	W	D	D	L	D	L	L	L	L	L	L	L	D	L	D	L	W	D	L	W	L	W	D	L	W	L	W	L	L	L	D	D
Position	9	7	7	7	8	7	5	6	7	12	11	13	13	14	15	16	16	18	18	19	18	19	17	17	18	16	18	17	16	16	16	16	15	15	16	17	17	16

Source: Ligue 1
A = Away; H = Home; W = Win; D = Draw; L = Loss

==== Matches ====
The league fixtures were announced on 25 June 2021.

8 August 2021 1	Saint-Étienne	1–1	Lorient	Saint-Étienne
15:00 CEST (UTC+2)	Kolodziejczak (yellow card) 35'; Youssouf (yellow card) 57'; Khazri 70' (pen.)	Report	Lemoine (yellow card) 45+1'; Igor (yellow card) 48'; Le Goff 52', (yellow card) 66'	Stadium: Stade Geoffroy-Guichard; Attendance: 20,461; Referee: Thomas Léonard

13 August 2021 2	Lorient	1–0	Monaco	Lorient
21:00 CEST (UTC+2)	Moffi 31' (pen.); Mendes (yellow card) 52'; Monconduit (yellow card) 56'; Hamel (yellow card) 86'	Report	Jakobs (yellow card) 45'; Volland (yellow card) 90+1'	Stadium: Stade du Moustoir; Attendance: 12,149; Referee: Hakim Ben El Hadj

22 August 2021 3	Montpellier	3–1	Lorient	Montpellier
15:00 CEST (UTC+2)	Savanier 50'; Mavididi 58'; Delort 83'	Report	Bertaud 21' (o.g.); Lemoine (yellow card) 49'; Monconduit (yellow card) 67'; Mendes (yellow card) 84' (yellow-red card) 86'; Hergault (yellow card) 87' (yellow-red card) 90+1'	Stadium: Stade de la Mosson; Attendance: 6,527; Referee: Bastien Dechepy

29 August 2021 4	Lens	2–2	Lorient	Lens
15:00 CEST (UTC+2)	Danso (yellow card) 18'; Clauss 24'; Fofana 70'; Medina (yellow card) 75'	Report	Abergel (yellow card) 6'; Fontaine (yellow card) 12'; Silva (yellow card) 23'; Laurienté 27'; Monconduit 35'; Nardi (yellow card) 59'	Stadium: Stade Bollaert-Delelis; Attendance: 35,029; Referee: Willy Delajod

10 September 2021 5	Lorient	2–1	Lille	Lorient
21:00 CEST (UTC+2)	Laurienté 7'; Abergel (yellow card) 34'; Moffi 87'; Boisgard (yellow card) 90+1'	Report	Yılmaz 25' (pen.); Gomes (yellow card) 44'; Xeka (yellow card) 90+3'	Stadium: Stade du Moustoir; Attendance: 10,271; Referee: Clément Turpin

19 September 2021 6	Reims	0–0	Lorient	Reims
15:00 CEST (UTC+2)	Munetsi (yellow card) 12'; Matusiwa (yellow card) 69'	Report	Laporte (yellow card) 75'; Abergel (yellow card) 88'; Diarra (yellow card) 90'	Stadium: Stade Auguste-Delaune; Attendance: 9,443; Referee: Hakim Ben El Hadj

22 September 2021 7	Lorient	1–0	Nice	Lorient
21:00 CEST (UTC+2)	Monconduit 23'; Jenz (yellow card) 62' (yellow-red card) 69'	Report	Kluivert (yellow card) 22'; Gouiri (penalty missed) 55'; Rosario (yellow card) 60'; Delort (yellow card) 78'; Atal (yellow card) 79'	Stadium: Stade du Moustoir; Attendance: 10,687; Referee: Romain Lissorgue

25 September 2021 8	Lyon	1–1	Lorient	Décines-Charpieu
21:00 CEST (UTC+2)	Emerson (red card) 15'; Toko Ekambi 50'; Dubois (yellow card) 67'	Report	Laurienté 20'; Abergel (yellow card) 28'; Lemoine (yellow card) 61'	Stadium: Parc Olympique Lyonnais; Attendance: 36,424; Referee: Bastien Dechepy

3 October 2021 9	Lorient	1–1	Clermont	Lorient
15:00 CEST (UTC+2)	Laporte 54', (yellow card) 79'; Jenz (yellow card) 55'	Report	Bayo 15'; Gastien (yellow card) 24'	Stadium: Stade du Moustoir; Attendance: 12,611; Referee: Pierre Gaillouste

17 October 2021 10	Marseille	4–1	Lorient	Marseille
20:45 CEST (UTC+2)	Kamara 27'; Guendouzi 56', 90+1'; Milik 85'	Report	Laurienté 13' (pen.), (yellow card) 81'	Stadium: Stade Vélodrome; Attendance: 57,349; Referee: Antony Gautier

24 October 2021 11	Lorient	1–1	Bordeaux	Lorient
15:00 CEST (UTC+2)	Abergel (yellow card) 45+1'; Boisgard (yellow card) 68'; Laporte 77', (yellow card) 79'; Soumano (yellow card) 90+3'	Report	Dilrosun (yellow card) 18'; Elis 47'; Oudin (yellow card) 72'; Onana (red card) 87'	Stadium: Stade du Moustoir; Attendance: 11,678; Referee: Thomas Léonard

31 October 2021 12	Strasbourg	4–0	Lorient	Strasbourg
15:00 CET (UTC+1)	Ajorque 28'; Sissoko (yellow card) 36'; Diallo 39', 45+1'; Thomasson 64'	Report		Stadium: Stade de la Meinau; Attendance: 24,002; Referee: Florent Batta

7 November 2021 13	Lorient	1–2	Brest	Lorient
15:00 CET (UTC+1)	Grbić 5'; Hergault (red card) 28'	Report	Honorat (yellow card) 44'; Faivre 58' (pen.); Mounié 80'	Stadium: Stade du Moustoir; Attendance: 14,649; Referee: Romain Lissorgue

21 November 2021 14	Angers	1–0	Lorient	Angers
15:00 CET (UTC+1)	Thomas (yellow card) 26'; Ounahi (yellow card) 39'; Mangani 68' (pen.); Cabot (yellow card) 72'; Doumbia (yellow card) 81'	Report		Stadium: Stade Raymond Kopa; Attendance: 6,971; Referee: Pierre Gaillouste

28 November 2021 15	Lorient	0–2	Rennes	Lorient
15:00 CET (UTC+1)		Report	Majer (yellow card) 32'; Laborde 75'; Doku 78', (yellow card) 83'	Stadium: Stade du Moustoir; Attendance: 16,321; Referee: Bastien Dechepy

1 December 2021 16	Troyes	2–0	Lorient	Troyes
19:00 CET (UTC+1)	Ripart 7'; Kouamé 34'; Kaboré (yellow card) 63'	Report	Diarra (yellow card) 83'	Stadium: Stade de l'Aube; Attendance: 6,506; Referee: Jérémy Stinat

5 December 2021 17	Lorient	0–1	Nantes	Lorient
15:00 CET (UTC+1)	Ouattara (yellow card) 26'	Report	Coulibaly (yellow card) 18'; Moutoussamy (yellow card) 48'; Cyprien 83'; Girotto (yellow card) 90+1'	Stadium: Stade du Moustoir; Attendance: 16,025; Referee: Ruddy Buquet

12 December 2021 18	Metz	4–1	Lorient	Metz
15:00 CET (UTC+1)	Sarr 5', (yellow card) 89'; Jens 9' (o.g.); Boulaya 19'; Pajot (yellow card) 49'; Niane 80'	Report	Abergel (yellow card) 17'; Laporte (yellow card) 28'; Jenz 69'	Stadium: Stade Saint-Symphorien; Attendance: 14,037; Referee: Eric Wattellier

22 December 2021 19	Lorient	1–1	Paris Saint-Germain	Lorient
21:00 CET (UTC+1)	Monconduit 40'; Ouattara (yellow card) 43'	Report	Ramos (yellow card) 81' (yellow-red card) 86'; Wijnaldum (yellow card) 85'; Icardi 90+1'	Stadium: Stade du Moustoir; Attendance: 16,603; Referee: Jérémie Pignard

16 January 2022 21	Lorient	0–0	Angers	Lorient
15:00 CET (UTC+1)	Abergel (yellow card) 53'; Jenz (yellow card) 68'; Laporte (yellow card) 69'	Report	Doumbia (red card) 14'; Ninga (yellow card) 56'	Stadium: Stade du Moustoir; Attendance: 4,387; Referee: Johan Hamel

19 January 2022 20	Lille	3–1	Lorient	Villeneuve-d'Ascq
19:00 CET (UTC+1)	Lihadji 10'; Jenz 19' (o.g.); Mandava 31'	Report	Soumano 90+1'	Stadium: Stade Pierre-Mauroy; Attendance: 4,834; Referee: Florent Batta

23 January 2022 22	Nantes	4–2	Lorient	Nantes
15:00 CET (UTC+1)	Girotto 39'; Moutoussamy (yellow card) 45+1'; Kolo Muani 53'; Bukari 69'; Fábio (yellow card) 77'; Appiah (yellow card) 83'; Geubbels 86'	Report	Moffi 56'; Soumano 85'	Stadium: Stade de la Beaujoire; Attendance: 4,275; Referee: Pierre Gaillouste

6 February 2022 23	Lorient	2–0	Lens	Lorient
13:00 CET (UTC+1)	Soumano 43'; Koné 76'	Report	Wooh (yellow card) 45+1'; Cahuzac (red card) 77'; Haïdara (yellow card) 79'; Frankowski (yellow card) 87'	Stadium: Stade du Moustoir; Attendance: 10,687; Referee: Romain Lissorgue

13 February 2022 24	Monaco	0–0	Lorient	Monaco
13:00 CET (UTC+1)	Caio (yellow card) 45'; Aguilar (yellow card) 73'; Akliouche (yellow card) 89'	Report	Boisgard (yellow card) 37'; Laurienté (yellow card) 81'	Stadium: Stade Louis II; Attendance: 3,963; Referee: Bastien Dechepy

20 February 2022 25	Lorient	0–1	Montpellier	Lorient
15:00 CET (UTC+1)	Laporte (yellow card) 31'; Innocent (yellow card) 47'	Report	Savanier 56'; Oyongo (yellow card) 60'; Souquet (yellow card) 61'	Stadium: Stade du Moustoir; Attendance: 10,135; Referee: Jérémy Stinat

27 February 2022 26	Brest	0–1	Lorient	Brest
15:00 CET (UTC+1)	Chardonnet (red card) 29'; Satriano (yellow card) 45+4'; Agoumé (yellow card) 81'	Report	Innocent (yellow card) 43'; Laurienté (yellow card) 45'; Mendes (yellow card) 45+4'; Abergel (yellow card) 65'; Koné 73'	Stadium: Stade Francis-Le Blé; Attendance: 14,050; Referee: Benoît Bastien

4 March 2022 27	Lorient	1–4	Lyon	Lorient
21:00 CET (UTC+1)	Monconduit (yellow card) 32'; Moffi 56'	Report	Faivre 5', 78'; Dembélé 26'; Toko Ekambi 59'	Stadium: Stade du Moustoir; Attendance: 13,497; Referee: Romain Lissorgue

13 March 2022 28	Clermont	0–2	Lorient	Clermont-Ferrand
15:00 CET (UTC+1)	Gastien (yellow card) 49'	Report	Innocent (yellow card) 53'; Koné 72', (yellow card) 83'; Pétrot 76'	Stadium: Stade Gabriel Montpied; Attendance: 11,359; Referee: Bastien Dechepy

20 March 2022 29	Lorient	0–0	Strasbourg	Lorient
15:00 CET (UTC+1)	Innocent (yellow card) 22'; Ouattara (yellow card) 76'	Report	Bellegarde (yellow card) 29'; Perrin (yellow card) 89'	Stadium: Stade du Moustoir; Attendance: 9,806; Referee: Benoît Millot

3 April 2022 30	Paris Saint-Germain	5–1	Lorient	Paris
20:45 CEST (UTC+2)	Neymar 12', 90'; Mbappé 28', 67'; Gueye (yellow card) 53'; Kimpembe (yellow card) 57'; Messi 73'	Report	Koné (yellow card) 38'; Moffi 56'	Stadium: Parc des Princes; Attendance: 40,000; Referee: Hakim Ben El Hadj

8 April 2022 31	Lorient	6–2	Saint-Étienne	Lorient
21:00 CEST (UTC+2)	Le Fée (yellow card) 29', (goal) 61'; Moffi 42' (pen.), 86', (yellow card) 87'; Koné 45+1', 65'; Boisgard 89'	Report	Bouanga 4'; Mangala (yellow card) 14'; Nordin 22'; Nadé (yellow card) 35'; Kolodziejczak (yellow card) 41'; Neyou (yellow card) 68' (yellow-red card) 68'	Stadium: Stade du Moustoir; Attendance: 15,407; Referee: Ruddy Buquet

17 April 2022 32	Nice	2–1	Lorient	Nice
13:00 CEST (UTC+2)	Daniliuc (yellow card) 45'; Delort 54' (pen.), 88'; Thuram (yellow card) 78'	Report	Jenz (yellow card) 53'; Laurienté 61'	Stadium: Allianz Riviera; Attendance: 17,212; Referee: Amaury Delerue

20 April 2022 33	Lorient	1–0	Metz	Lorient
19:00 CEST (UTC+2)	Laporte (yellow card) 22'; Mendes (yellow card) 81'; Ouattara 90+4'	Report	Amadou (yellow card) 36'; Nguette (yellow card) 84'	Stadium: Stade du Moustoir; Attendance: 13,554; Referee: Mikael Lesage

24 April 2022 34	Rennes	5–0	Lorient	Rennes
13:00 CEST (UTC+2)	Bourigeaud 17'; Terrier 19'; Santamaria (yellow card) 26'; Traoré 47'; Aguerd (red card) 58'; Tait 79'; Laborde 90+3'	Report		Stadium: Roazhon Park; Attendance: 28,384; Referee: Benoît Millot

1 May 2022 35	Lorient	1–2	Reims	Lorient
15:00 CEST (UTC+2)	Monconduit (yellow card) 22'; Moffi 32'; Abergel (yellow card) 74'	Report	Zeneli 17'; Doumbia (yellow card) 57'; Touré 59'	Stadium: Stade du Moustoir; Attendance: 12,216; Referee: Pierre Gaillouste

8 May 2022 36	Lorient	0–3	Marseille	Lorient
17:05 CEST (UTC+2)	Lemoine (yellow card) 56'	Report	Dieng 39'; Guendouzi 48'; Saliba (yellow card) 65'; Gerson 67'	Stadium: Stade du Moustoir; Attendance: 16,210; Referee: Bastien Dechepy

14 May 2022 37	Bordeaux	0–0	Lorient	Bordeaux
21:00 CEST (UTC+2)	Ihnatenko (yellow card) 24'; Fransérgio (yellow card) 70'; Mensah (red card) 86'; Ahmedhodžić (yellow card) 90'	Report	Lemoine (yellow card) 45+1'; Ouattara (yellow card) 52'; Laurienté (yellow card) 56'; Le Fée (yellow card) 90'	Stadium: Matmut Atlantique; Attendance: 23,191; Referee: Ruddy Buquet

21 May 2022 38	Lorient	1–1	Troyes	Lorient
21:00 CEST (UTC+2)	Monconduit (yellow card) 59'; Laurienté 74', (yellow card) 90'	Report	Touzghar 22'; Ripart (yellow card) 64'; Larouci (yellow card) 78'; Kaboré (red card) 85'	Stadium: Stade du Moustoir; Attendance: 15,131; Referee: Johan Hamel

=== Coupe de France ===
18 December 2021 Round of 64	Rennes	1–0	Lorient	Rennes
21:00 CET (UTC+1)	Omari 21'	Report		Stadium: Roazhon Park; Attendance: 19,636; Referee: Amaury Delerue

== Statistics ==
=== Appearances and goals ===
No.	Pos	Nat	Player	Total		Ligue 1		Coupe de France	
No.	Pos	Nat	Player	Apps	Goals	Apps	Goals	Apps	Goals
Goalkeepers
1	GK	(France) FRA	Matthieu Dreyer	0	0	0	0	0	0
16	GK	(France) FRA	Teddy Bartouche	0	0	0	0	0	0
30	GK	(France) FRA	Paul Nardi	11	0	11	0	0	0
40	GK	(France) FRA	Thomas Callens	0	0	0	0	0	0
Defenders
2	DF	(Brazil) BRA	Igor Silva	11	0	9+2	0	0	0
3	DF	(Germany) GER	Moritz Jenz	6	0	6	0	0	0
4	DF	(France) FRA	Loris Mouyokolo	0	0	0	0	0	0
5	DF	(Madagascar) MAD	Thomas Fontaine	2	0	2	0	0	0
14	DF	(France) FRA	Jérôme Hergault	4	0	2+2	0	0	0
15	DF	(France) FRA	Julien Laporte	11	2	11	2	0	0
17	DF	(France) FRA	Houboulang Mendes	10	0	10	0	0	0
20	DF	(France) FRA	Samuel Loric	0	0	0	0	0	0
21	DF	(Madagascar) MAD	Jérémy Morel	2	0	2	0	0	0
25	DF	(France) FRA	Vincent Le Goff	11	1	11	1	0	0
36	DF	(France) FRA	Léo Pétrot	2	0	2	0	0	0
37	DF	(France) FRA	Théo Le Bris	2	0	0+2	0	0	0
Midfielders
6	MF	(France) FRA	Laurent Abergel	10	0	10	0	0	0
10	MF	(France) FRA	Enzo Le Fée	10	1	6+4	1	0	0
11	MF	(France) FRA	Quentin Boisgard	5	0	1+4	0	0	0
18	MF	(France) FRA	Fabien Lemoine	9	0	9	0	0	0
23	MF	(France) FRA	Thomas Monconduit	11	2	7+4	2	0	0
39	MF	(Ivory Coast) CIV	Bamo Meïté	0	0	0	0	0	0
Forwards
7	FW	(Ivory Coast) CIV	Stéphane Diarra	7	0	2+5	0	0	0
13	FW	(Nigeria) NGR	Terem Moffi	10	2	10	2	0	0
27	FW	(Austria) AUT	Adrian Grbić	9	0	1+8	0	0	0
28	FW	(France) FRA	Armand Laurienté	10	4	9+1	4	0	0
31	FW	(France) FRA	Redwan Bourlès	2	0	0+2	0	0	0
38	FW	(Senegal) SEN	Sambou Soumano	1	0	0+1	0	0	0
38	FW	(Burkina Faso) BFA	Dango Ouattara	4	0	0+4	0	0	0
Players transferred out during the season
	DF	(France) FRA	Julien Ponceau	0	0	0	0	0	0
	DF	(France) FRA	Tom Renaud	0	0	0	0	0	0
	FW	(Turkey) TUR	Umut Bozok	0	0	0	0	0	0
29	FW	(France) FRA	Pierre-Yves Hamel	3	0	0+3	0	0	0

Last updated: 28 September 2021
Source: Competitions

=== Goalscorers ===
As of 8 August 2021

Rank	No.	Pos.	Nat.	Name	Ligue 1	Coupe de France	Total
1	25	DF	(France)	Vincent Le Goff	1	0	1
Totals					1	0	1
