= 2019–20 FC Lorient season =

FC Lorient
2019–20 season
- Chairman: Loïc Fery
- Manager: Christophe Pélissier
- Stadium: Stade du Moustoir
- Ligue 2: 1st (promoted)
- Coupe de France: Round of 32
- Coupe de la Ligue: First round
- Top goalscorer: League: Yoane Wissa (15); All: Yoane Wissa (16)
Home colours	Away colours

The 2019–20 season was the 94th season in the existence of FC Lorient and the club's third consecutive season in the second division of French football. In addition to the domestic league, Lorient participated in this season's editions of the Coupe de France and the Coupe de la Ligue. The season was scheduled to cover the period from 1 July 2019 to 30 June 2020.

== Players ==
=== First-team squad ===
As of 19 October 2019.

Note: Flags indicate national team as defined under FIFA eligibility rules; some limited exceptions apply. Players may hold more than one non-FIFA nationality.

No.	Pos.	Nation	Player
1	GK	FRA	Romain Cagnon
4	DF	FRA	Joris Sainati
5	DF	MAD	Thomas Fontaine
6	MF	FRA	Laurent Abergel
7	DF	FRA	Jonathan Martins Pereira
8	MF	FRA	Maxime Etuin
9	FW	TUR	Umut Bozok
11	FW	COD	Yann Kitala (on loan from Lyon)
14	DF	FRA	Jérôme Hergault
15	DF	FRA	Julien Laporte
16	GK	FRA	Teddy Bartouche
17	DF	FRA	Houboulang Mendes
18	MF	FRA	Fabien Lemoine
19	FW	COD	Yoane Wissa
20	DF	FRA	Matthieu Saunier

No.	Pos.	Nation	Player
21	FW	FRA	Samuel Loric
22	MF	FRA	Jonathan Delaplace
23	DF	FRA	Quentin Lecoeuche
24	MF	CMR	Franklin Wadja
25	DF	FRA	Vincent Le Goff (captain)
27	MF	FRA	Jimmy Cabot
28	FW	FRA	Armand Laurienté (on loan from Rennes)
29	FW	FRA	Pierre-Yves Hamel
30	GK	FRA	Paul Nardi
31	MF	FRA	Enzo Le Fée
32	MF	FRA	Sylvain Marveaux
37	MF	FRA	Julien Ponceau
39	DF	FRA	Tom Renaud
40	GK	FRA	Maxime Pattier

== Competitions ==
=== Overview ===
Competition	First match	Last match	Starting round	Final position	Record							
Competition	First match	Last match	Starting round	Final position	Pld	W	D	L	GF	GA	GD	Win %
Ligue 2	29 July 2019	7 March 2020	Matchday 1	Winners	28	17	3	8	45	25	+20	60.71
Coupe de France	16 November 2019	19 January 2020	Seventh round	Round of 32	4	3	0	1	6	2	+4	75.00
Coupe de la Ligue	13 August 2019		First round	First round	1	0	0	1	1	2	−1	0.00
Total					33	20	3	10	52	29	+23	60.61

Source: Soccerway

=== Ligue 2 ===
==== League table ====
Pos	Team	Pld	W	D	L	GF	GA	GD	Pts	Promotion or Relegation
1	Lorient (C, P)	28	17	3	8	45	25	+20	54	Promotion to Ligue 1
2	Lens (P)	28	15	8	5	39	24	+15	53	Promotion to Ligue 1
3	Ajaccio	28	15	7	6	38	22	+16	52	
4	Troyes	28	16	3	9	34	25	+9	51	
5	Clermont	28	14	8	6	35	25	+10	50	

Source: Ligue 2
Rules for classification: 1) Points; 2) Goal difference; 3) Number of goals scored; 4) Head-to-head goal difference; 5) Fair play points
(C) Champions; (P) Promoted

==== Results summary ====
Overall								Home						Away					
Pld	W	D	L	GF	GA	GD	Pts	W	D	L	GF	GA	GD	W	D	L	GF	GA	GD
28	17	3	8	45	25	+20	54	9	1	4	22	12	+10	8	2	4	23	13	+10

Source: Ligue 2

==== Results by round ====
Round	1	2	3	4	5	6	7	8	9	10	11	12	13	14	15	16	17	18	19	20	21	22	23	24	25	26	27	28	29	30	31	32	33	34	35	36	37	38
Ground	H	A	A	H	A	H	A	H	A	H	A	H	A	H	A	H	A	H	A	H	H	A	H	A	H	A	H	A	H	A	H	A	H	A	H	A	H	A
Result	W	W	D	W	W	L	W	W	W	D	D	L	L	W	W	W	W	W	L	W	W	W	W	L	L	W	L	L	C	C	C	C	C	C	C	C	C	C
Position	1	2	1	2	1	2	1	1	1	1	1	1	4	2	2	1	1	1	2	1	1	1	1	1	1	1	1	1	1	1	1	1	1	1	1	1	1	1

Source: Ligue 2
A = Away; H = Home; W = Win; D = Draw; L = Loss

==== Matches ====
The league fixtures were announced on 14 June 2019. The Ligue 2 matches were suspended by the LFP on 13 March 2020 due to COVID-19 until further notices. On 28 April 2020, it was announced that Ligue 1 and Ligue 2 campaigns would not resume, after the country banned all sporting events until September. On 30 April, The LFP ended officially the 2019–20 season.

29 July 2019 1	Lorient	3–0	Paris FC	Lorient
20:45 CEST (UTC+2)		Report		Stadium: Stade du Moustoir

5 August 2019 2	Caen	1–2	Lorient	Caen
20:45 CEST (UTC+2)		Report		Stadium: Stade Michel d'Ornano

9 August 2019 3	Nancy	1–1	Lorient	Tomblaine
20:00 CEST (UTC+2)		Report		Stadium: Stade Marcel Picot

16 August 2019 4	Lorient	1–0	Sochaux	Lorient
20:00 CEST (UTC+2)		Report		Stadium: Stade du Moustoir

23 August 2019 5	Le Mans	1–2	Lorient	Le Mans
20:00 CEST (UTC+2)		Report		Stadium: MMArena

31 August 2019 6	Lorient	0–1	Guingamp	Lorient
15:00 CEST (UTC+2)		Report		Stadium: Stade du Moustoir

14 September 2019 7	Clermont	0–2	Lorient	Clermont-Ferrand
14:45 CEST (UTC+2)		Report		Stadium: Stade Gabriel Montpied

23 September 2019 8	Lorient	2–1	Rodez	Lorient
20:45 CEST (UTC+2)		Report		Stadium: Stade du Moustoir

27 September 2019 9	Chambly	0–1	Lorient	Beauvais
20:00 CEST (UTC+2)		Report		Stadium: Stade Pierre Brisson

4 October 2019 10	Lorient	0–0	Ajaccio	Lorient
20:00 CEST (UTC+2)		Report		Stadium: Stade du Moustoir

19 October 2019 11	Le Havre	2–2	Lorient	Le Havre
15:00 CEST (UTC+2)		Report		Stadium: Stade Océane

26 October 2019 12	Lorient	0–1	Troyes	Lorient
15:00 CEST (UTC+2)		Report		Stadium: Stade du Moustoir

2 November 2019 13	Lens	1–0	Lorient	Lens
15:00 CET (UTC+1)		Report		Stadium: Stade Bollaert-Delelis

8 November 2019 14	Lorient	4–1	Niort	Lorient
CET (UTC+1)				Stadium: Stade du Moustoir

22 November 2019 15	Châteauroux	1–3	Lorient	Châteauroux
CET (UTC+1)				Stadium: Stade Gaston Petit

29 November 2019 16	Lorient	2–1	Grenoble	Lorient
CET (UTC+1)				Stadium: Stade du Moustoir

3 December 2019 17	Orléans	0–4	Lorient	Orléans
CET (UTC+1)				Stadium: Stade de la Source

13 December 2019 18	Lorient	1–0	Auxerre	Lorient
CET (UTC+1)				Stadium: Stade du Moustoir

20 December 2019 19	Valenciennes	3–0	Lorient	Valenciennes
CET (UTC+1)				Stadium: Stade du Hainaut

13 January 2020 20	Lorient	2–1	Caen	Lorient
CET (UTC+1)				Stadium: Stade du Moustoir

24 January 2020 21	Lorient	2–1	Nancy	Lorient
20:00 CET (UTC+1)	Marveaux 29'; Bozok 90'	Report	Lybohy 74'	Stadium: Stade du Moustoir; Referee: Ruddy Buquet

1 February 2020 22	Sochaux	0–4	Lorient	Montbéliard
CET (UTC+1)				Stadium: Stade Auguste Bonal

4 February 2020 23	Lorient	4–2	Le Mans	Lorient
CET (UTC+1)				Stadium: Stade du Moustoir

8 February 2020 24	Guingamp	2–1	Lorient	Guingamp
CET (UTC+1)				Stadium: Stade de Roudourou

15 February 2020 25	Lorient	0–1	Clermont	Lorient
CET (UTC+1)				Stadium: Stade du Moustoir

21 February 2020 26	Rodez	0–1	Lorient	Rodez
CET (UTC+1)				Stadium: Stade Paul-Lignon

29 February 2020 27	Lorient	1–2	Chambly	Lorient
CET (UTC+1)				Stadium: Stade du Moustoir

7 March 2020 28	Ajaccio	1–0	Lorient	Ajaccio
15:00 CET (UTC+1)	Bayala 52'	Report		Stadium: Stade François Coty; Referee: Eric Wattellier

=== Coupe de France ===
16 November 2019 Seventh round	Lorient	3–0	Guingamp	Lorient
17:30 CET (UTC+1)				Stadium: Stade du Moustoir; Attendance: 7,660; Referee: Bartolomeu Varela

7 December 2019 Eighth round	Stade Pontivyen	0–1	Lorient	Pontivy
14:15 CET (UTC+1)				Stadium: Stade du Faubourg de Verdun; Attendance: 2,936; Referee: Cédric Dos Santos

5 January 2020 Round of 64	Lorient	2–1 (a.e.t.)	Brest	Lorient
14:15 CET (UTC+1)				Stadium: Stade du Moustoir; Attendance: 10,686; Referee: Eric Wattellier

19 January 2020 Round of 32	Lorient	0–1	Paris Saint-Germain	Lorient
20:55 CET (UTC+1)				Stadium: Stade du Moustoir; Attendance: 14,000; Referee: Karim Abed

=== Coupe de la Ligue ===
13 August 2019 First round	Lorient	1–2	Le Mans	Lorient
18:45 CEST (UTC+2)				Stadium: Stade du Moustoir; Attendance: 7,454; Referee: Alexandre Perreau Niel
