= Chalobah =

Chalobah is a surname. Notable people with the surname include:

- Nathaniel Chalobah (born 1994), English footballer
- Trevoh Chalobah (born 1999), English footballer
