= Quentin Boisgard =

French footballer (born 1997)

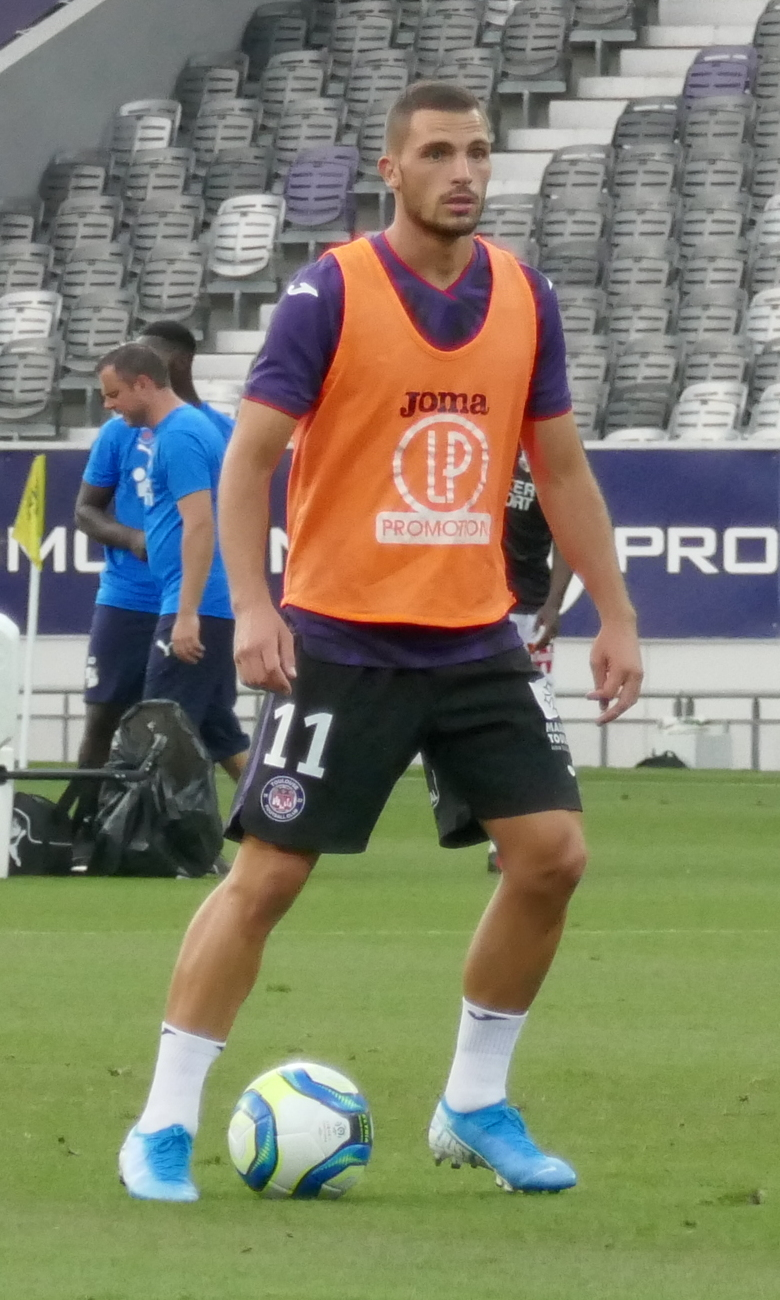
- Boisgard in 2019

Personal information
- Full name: Quentin Lou Boisgard
- Date of birth: 17 March 1997 (age 29)
- Place of birth: Toulouse, France
- Height: 1.75 m (5 ft 9 in)
- Position: Midfielder

Team information
- Current team: Piast Gliwice
- Number: 17

Youth career
- 2005–2017: Toulouse

Senior career*
Years	Team	Apps	(Gls)
2015–2020	Toulouse B	43	(5)
2017–2020	Toulouse	26	(1)
2018–2019	→ Pau (loan)	29	(6)
2020–2024	Lorient	54	(4)
2023	→ Pau (loan)	18	(1)
2024–2025	Apollon Limassol	29	(0)
2025–	Piast Gliwice	31	(3)
- * Club domestic league appearances and goals as of 21:34, 13 October 2026 (UTC)

Quentin Lou Boisgard (born 17 March 1997) is a French professional footballer who plays as a midfielder for Ekstraklasa club Piast Gliwice.

== Club career ==
Boisgard is a youth exponent from Toulouse FC. He made his Ligue 1 debut on 4 November 2017 against Nantes, coming on for Max-Alain Gradel in the 75th minute of a 2–1 away loss.

Boisgard joined FC Lorient in July 2020, after Toulouse's relegation from and Lorient promotion to Ligue 1. He signed a four-year contract while Lorient paid a reported €2 million transfer fee to Toulouse.

On 24 January 2023, he joined Ligue 2 club Pau FC on loan for the remainder of the 2022–23 season.

== Career statistics ==
As of match played 17 May 2026

Appearances and goals by club, season and competition
Club	Season	League			National cup (Note: Includes Coupe de France, Cypriot Cup, Polish Cup)		League cup (Note: Includes Coupe de la Ligue)		Europe		Other		Total	
Club	Season	Division	Apps	Goals	Apps	Goals	Apps	Goals	Apps	Goals	Apps	Goals	Apps	Goals
Toulouse	2015–16	Ligue 1	0	0	0	0	1	0	—		—		1	0
Toulouse	2016–17	Ligue 1	0	0	0	0	0	0	—		—		0	0
Toulouse	2017–18	Ligue 1	6	0	2	0	1	0	—		—		9	0
Toulouse	2019–20	Ligue 1	20	1	1	0	2	0	—		—		23	1
Toulouse	Total		26	1	3	0	4	0	—		—		33	1
Pau (loan)	2018–19	National	29	6	2	0	—		—		—		31	6
Lorient	2020–21	Ligue 1	24	2	2	0	—		—		—		26	2
Lorient	2021–22	Ligue 1	25	1	1	0	—		—		—		26	1
Lorient	2022–23	Ligue 1	5	1	1	0	—		—		—		6	1
Lorient	Total		54	4	4	0	—		—		—		58	4
Pau (loan)	2022–23	Ligue 2	18	1	—		—		—		—		18	1
Apollon Limassol	2024–25	Cypriot First Division	29	0	4	0	—		—		—		33	0
Piast Gliwice	2025–26	Ekstraklasa	22	2	3	0	—		—		25	2		
Career total			178	14	16	0	4	0	0	0	0	0	198	14
