= Julien Laporte =

French footballer (born 1993)

Personal information
- Date of birth: 4 November 1993 (age 33)
- Place of birth: Clermont-Ferrand, France
- Height: 1.85 m (6 ft 1 in)
- Position: Centre-back

Team information
- Current team: Montpellier
- Number: 15

Senior career*
Years	Team	Apps	(Gls)
2010–2011	Aurillac Arpajon	8	(0)
2012–2017	Clermont B	59	(4)
2015–2019	Clermont	99	(6)
2019–2025	Lorient	151	(5)
2024–2025	Lorient B	1	(1)
2025–	Montpellier	29	(1)
- * Club domestic league appearances and goals as of 11 May 2026

Julien Laporte (born 4 November 1993) is a French professional footballer who plays as a centre-back for Ligue 2 club Montpellier.

== Career statistics ==
As of 10 May 2025

Appearances and goals by club, season and competition
Club	Season	League			National cup		League cup		Other		Total	
Club	Season	Division	Apps	Goals	Apps	Goals	Apps	Goals	Apps	Goals	Apps	Goals
Aurillac Arpajon	2010–11	CFA	8	0	—		—		—		8	0
Clermont B	2012–13	CFA 2	12	2	—		—		—		12	2
Clermont B	2013–14	CFA 2	20	1	—		—		—		20	1
Clermont B	2014–15	CFA 2	20	1	—		—		—		20	1
Clermont B	2015–16	CFA 2	4	0	—		—		—		4	0
Clermont B	2016–17	CFA 2	3	0	—		—		—		3	0
Clermont B	2018–19	National 3	1	0	—		—		—		1	0
Clermont B	Total		60	4	—		—		—		60	4
Clermont	2014–15	Ligue 2	1	0	0	0	0	0	—		1	0
Clermont	2015–16	Ligue 2	20	1	1	0	2	0	—		23	1
Clermont	2016–17	Ligue 2	22	2	2	0	3	1	—		27	3
Clermont	2017–18	Ligue 2	32	3	1	0	2	0	—		35	3
Clermont	2018–19	Ligue 2	24	0	3	0	1	0	—		28	0
Clermont	Total		99	6	7	0	8	1	—		114	7
Lorient	2019–20	Ligue 2	24	1	3	0	0	0	—		27	1
Lorient	2020–21	Ligue 1	30	0	1	0	—		—		31	0
Lorient	2021–22	Ligue 1	33	2	0	0	—		—		33	2
Lorient	2022–23	Ligue 1	20	0	0	0	—		—		20	0
Lorient	2023–24	Ligue 1	23	0	1	0	—		—		24	0
Lorient	2024–25	Ligue 1	21	2	2	2	—		—		23	4
Lorient	Total		151	5	7	2	0	0	—		158	7
Lorient B	2024–25	National 3	1	1	—		—		—		1	1
Career total			319	16	14	2	8	1	0	0	340	18

== Honours ==
Lorient

- Ligue 2: 2019–20, 2024–25
