= Enzo Le Fée =

Breton footballer (born 2000)

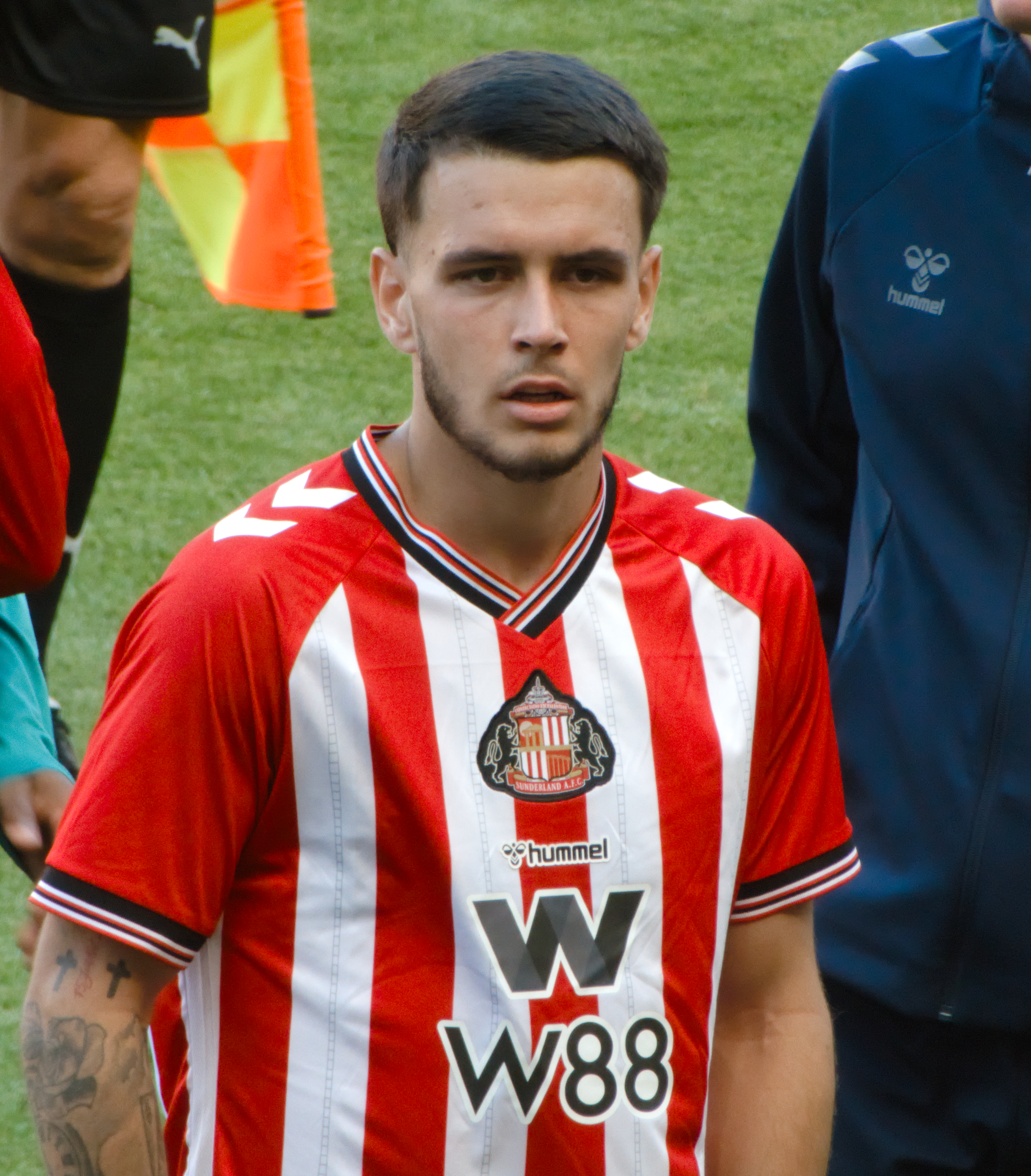
- Le Fée with Sunderland in 2025

Personal information
- Full name: Enzo Jérémy Le Fée
- Date of birth: 3 February 2000 (age 26)
- Place of birth: Lorient, France
- Height: 1.70 m (5 ft 7 in)
- Position: Midfielder

Team information
- Current team: Sunderland
- Number: 28

Youth career
- 2005–2008: La Vigilante FL Kéryado
- 2008–2018: Lorient

Senior career*
Years	Team	Apps	(Gls)
2018–2022	Lorient B	21	(1)
2019–2023	Lorient	135	(7)
2023–2024	Rennes	25	(0)
2024–2025	Roma	6	(0)
2025	→ Sunderland (loan)	15	(1)
2025–	Sunderland	46	(8)

International career
2019	France U20	5	(0)
2021–2023	France U21	15	(3)
2021	France Olympic	4	(0)
- * Club domestic league appearances and goals as of 18:28, 8 November 2026 (UTC)

Enzo Jérémy Le Fée (born 3 February 2000) is a French professional footballer who plays as a midfielder for Premier League club Sunderland.

== Club career ==
=== Lorient ===
Le Fée began his football career in the youth academy of Kéryado, before moving to the youth academy of Lorient at the age of eight. On 13 November 2018, he signed his first professional contract with Lorient. He made his professional debut for Lorient in a 0–0 Ligue 2 tie with Sochaux on 10 May 2019.

=== Rennes ===
On 7 July 2023, Le Fée signed for fellow Ligue 1 club Rennes. He made his Ligue 1 debut starting in a 5–1 win over Metz.

=== Roma ===
On 10 July 2024, Le Fée signed for Serie A club Roma on a 5-year contract worth €23 million.

=== Sunderland ===
On 10 January 2025, Le Fée joined English club Sunderland for the remainder of the season with a mandatory obligation which would be triggered if Sunderland got promoted to the Premier League. He scored his first Sunderland goal on 12 February 2025, in a 2–0 EFL Championship win against Luton Town.

After gaining promotion to the Premier League, Sunderland triggered the clause included in Le Fée's loan deal to make his stay permanent for a £19 million deal. Le Fée signed a four-year deal becoming Sunderland's first signing of their return to the top flight.

== International career ==
Between 2019 and 2023, Le Fée has represented both France U19 and France U21. He also represented the France Olympic team four times including three appearances during the 2020 Summer Olympics.

== Personal life ==
Le Fée's father, Jérémy Lamprière, had shown early footballing promise but was released by Rennes aged 15, and subsequently spent several stints in prison, with convictions for drug dealing and violence. Lamprière committed suicide in 2021.

Le Fée goes by his mother's surname, which means "the fairy".

== Career statistics ==
As of match played 8 November 2026

Appearances and goals by club, season, and competition
Club	Season	League			National cup (Note: Includes Coupe de France, Coppa Italia, FA Cup)		League cup (Note: Includes Coupe de la Ligue, EFL Cup)		Europe		Other		Total	
Club	Season	Division	Apps	Goals	Apps	Goals	Apps	Goals	Apps	Goals	Apps	Goals	Apps	Goals
Lorient B	2017–18	CFA	3	1	—		—		—		—		3	1
Lorient B	2018–19	CFA	17	0	—		—		—		—		17	0
Lorient B	2021–22	CFA	1	0	—		—		—		—		1	0
Lorient B	Total		21	1	—		—		—		—		21	1
Lorient	2018–19	Ligue 2	2	0	1	0	0	0	—		—		3	0
Lorient	2019–20	Ligue 2	26	0	2	0	1	0	—		—		29	0
Lorient	2020–21	Ligue 1	36	0	1	0	—		—		—		37	0
Lorient	2021–22	Ligue 1	36	2	1	0	—		—		—		37	2
Lorient	2022–23	Ligue 1	35	5	1	1	—		—		—		36	6
Lorient	Total		135	7	6	1	1	0	—		—		142	8
Rennes	2023–24	Ligue 1	25	0	4	0	—		6 (Note: Appearances in UEFA Europa League)	0	—		35	0
Roma	2024–25	Serie A	6	0	1	0	—		3	0	—		10	0
Sunderland (loan)	2024–25	Championship	15	1	—		—		—		3 (Note: Appearances in Championship play-offs)	0	18	1
Sunderland	2025–26	Premier League	36	5	3	1	1	0	—		—		40	6
Sunderland	2026–27	Premier League	10	3	0	0	0	0	4	1	—		14	4
Sunderland	Sunderland total		61	9	3	1	1	0	4	1	3	0	72	11
Career total			248	17	14	2	2	0	13	1	3	0	280	20

== Honours ==
Lorient

- Ligue 2: 2019–20

Sunderland

- EFL Championship play-offs: 2025
