= Paul Nardi =

French footballer (born 1994)

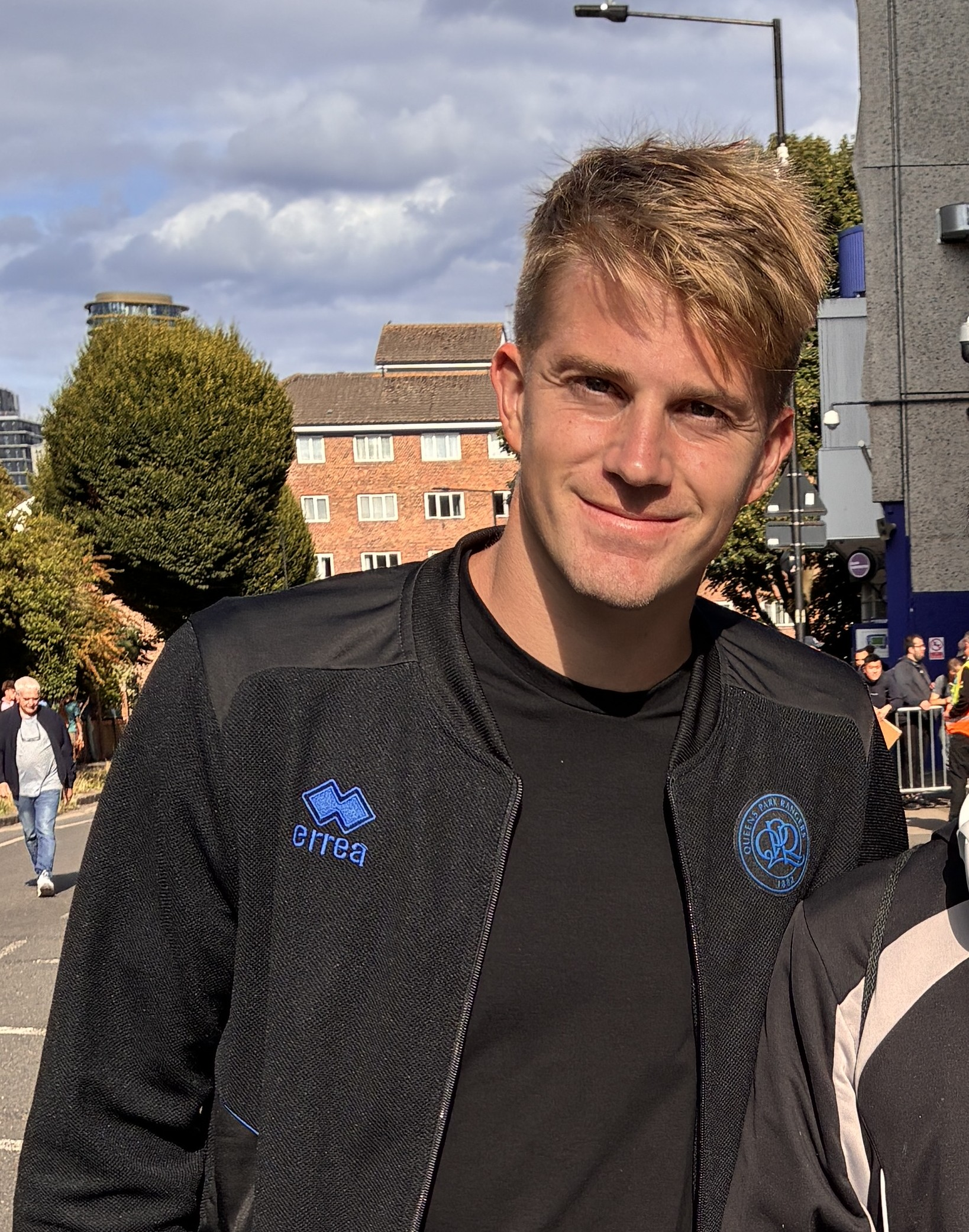
- Nardi with Queens Park Rangers in 2025.

Personal information
- Date of birth: 18 May 1994 (age 32)
- Place of birth: Vesoul, France
- Height: 1.86 m (6 ft 1 in)
- Position: Goalkeeper

Team information
- Current team: Auxerre
- Number: 1

Youth career
- 2000–2003: AS de Vaivre et Montoille
- 2003–2006: Vesoul Haute-Saône
- 2006–2013: Nancy

Senior career*
Years	Team	Apps	(Gls)
2011–2013	Nancy B	30	(0)
2013–2014	Nancy	33	(0)
2014–2019	Monaco	2	(0)
2014–2015	→ Nancy (loan)	29	(0)
2016	→ Rennes (loan)	0	(0)
2017–2019	→ Cercle Brugge (loan)	73	(0)
2019–2022	Lorient	73	(0)
2022–2024	Gent	41	(0)
2024	Jong Gent	1	(0)
2024–2026	Queens Park Rangers	62	(0)
2026–	Auxerre	0	(0)

International career
2011	France U17	1	(0)
2011	France U18	1	(0)
2012	France U19	1	(0)
2013–2014	France U20	5	(0)
2015	France U21	3	(0)
- * Club domestic league appearances and goals as of 1 February 2026 (UTC)

Paul Nardi (born 18 May 1994) is a French professional footballer who plays as a goalkeeper for Ligue 1 club Auxerre.

== Career ==
=== Nancy ===
Nardi is a youth exponent from Nancy. He made his Ligue 2 debut at 13 September 2013 against Créteil-Lusitanos. He never left the starting eleven since then.

=== Monaco ===
On 7 June 2014, Nardi joined Monaco, for a fee of £2.5 million. He returned to Nancy on loan for the 2014–15 season.

==== Loans ====
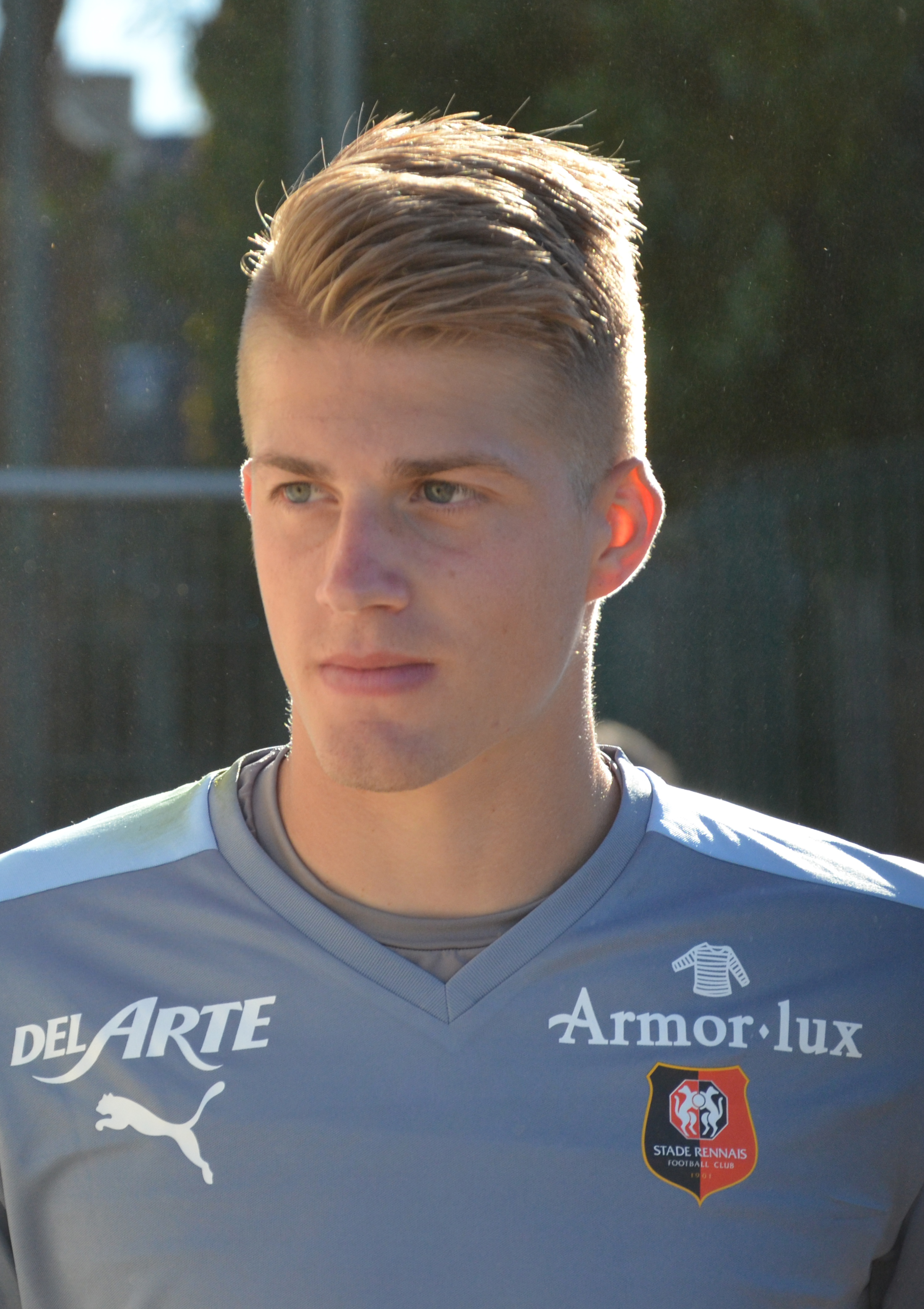
Nardi with Rennes in 2016.

On 22 June 2016, he joined Rennes on a one-year loan, with an option to buy. On 2 January 2017, Nardi and Rennes agreed a loan termination, and he joined Cercle Brugge on a two and a half season loan.

=== Lorient ===
On 23 July 2019, Nardi joined Lorient on a four-year deal.

=== Gent ===
On 31 August 2022, Nardi joined Belgian First Division A club Gent on a two-year deal.

=== Queens Park Rangers ===
On 27 June 2024, Nardi agreed to join EFL Championship side Queens Park Rangers.

On 18 September 2025 He was named as the 1189th player to play for Queens Park Rangers with his debut on 10/08/2024.

On 5 May 2026 it was announced by Queens Park Rangers that he would leave the club at the end of the 2025–26 season.

=== Auxerre ===
On 22 July 2026, Nardi returned to France and signed a two-year contract with Auxerre.

== Career statistics ==
=== Club ===
As of match played 6 January 2025

Appearances and goals by club, season and competition
Club	Season	League			National cup (Note: Includes Coupe de France, Belgian Cup)		League cup (Note: Coupe de la Ligue)		Europe		Other		Total	
Club	Season	Division	Apps	Goals	Apps	Goals	Apps	Goals	Apps	Goals	Apps	Goals	Apps	Goals
Nancy II	2010–11	CFA	2	0	—		—		—		—		2	0
Nancy II	2011–12	CFA	8	0	—		—		—		—		8	0
Nancy II	2012–13	CFA	17	0	—		—		—		—		17	0
Nancy II	2013–14	CFA	3	0	—		—		—		—		3	0
Nancy II	Total		30	0	0	0	0	0	0	0	0	0	30	0
Nancy	2013–14	Ligue 2	33	0	1	0	2	0	—		—		36	0
Nancy (loan)	2014–15	Ligue 2	29	0	0	0	0	0	—		—		29	0
Monaco II	2015–16	CFA	2	0	—		—		—		—		2	0
Monaco	2015–16	Ligue 1	2	0	3	0	1	0	0	0	0	0	6	0
Rennes II (loan)	2016–17	CFA	1	0	—		—		—		—		1	0
Rennes (loan)	2016–17	Ligue 1	0	0	0	0	1	0	—		—		1	0
Cercle Brugge (loan)	2016–17	Belgian First Division B	14	0	0	0	—		—		0	0	14	0
Cercle Brugge (loan)	2017–18	Belgian First Division B	29	0	1	0	—		—		0	0	30	0
Cercle Brugge (loan)	2018–19	Belgian First Division A	38	0	0	0	—		—		0	0	38	0
Cercle Brugge (loan)	Total		81	0	1	0	—		—		0	0	82	0
Lorient	2019–20	Ligue 2	28	0	3	0	0	0	—		—		31	0
Lorient	2020–21	Ligue 1	23	0	0	0	—		—		—		23	0
Lorient	2021–22	Ligue 1	22	0	0	0	—		—		—		22	0
Lorient	Total		73	0	4	0	0	0	—		—		76	0
Gent	2022–23	Belgian Pro League	30	0	0	0	—		5	0	0	0	35	0
Gent	2023–24	Belgian Pro League	11	0	0	0	—		3	0	0	0	14	0
Gent	Total		41	0	0	0	—		8	0	0	0	49	0
Queens Park Rangers	2024-25	Championship	26	0	0	0	0	0	—		0	0	26	0
Career total			318	0	9	0	4	0	8	0	0	0	338	0

== Honours ==
Individual

- Toulon Tournament Best Goalkeeper: 2014
