= Laurent Abergel =

French footballer (born 1993)

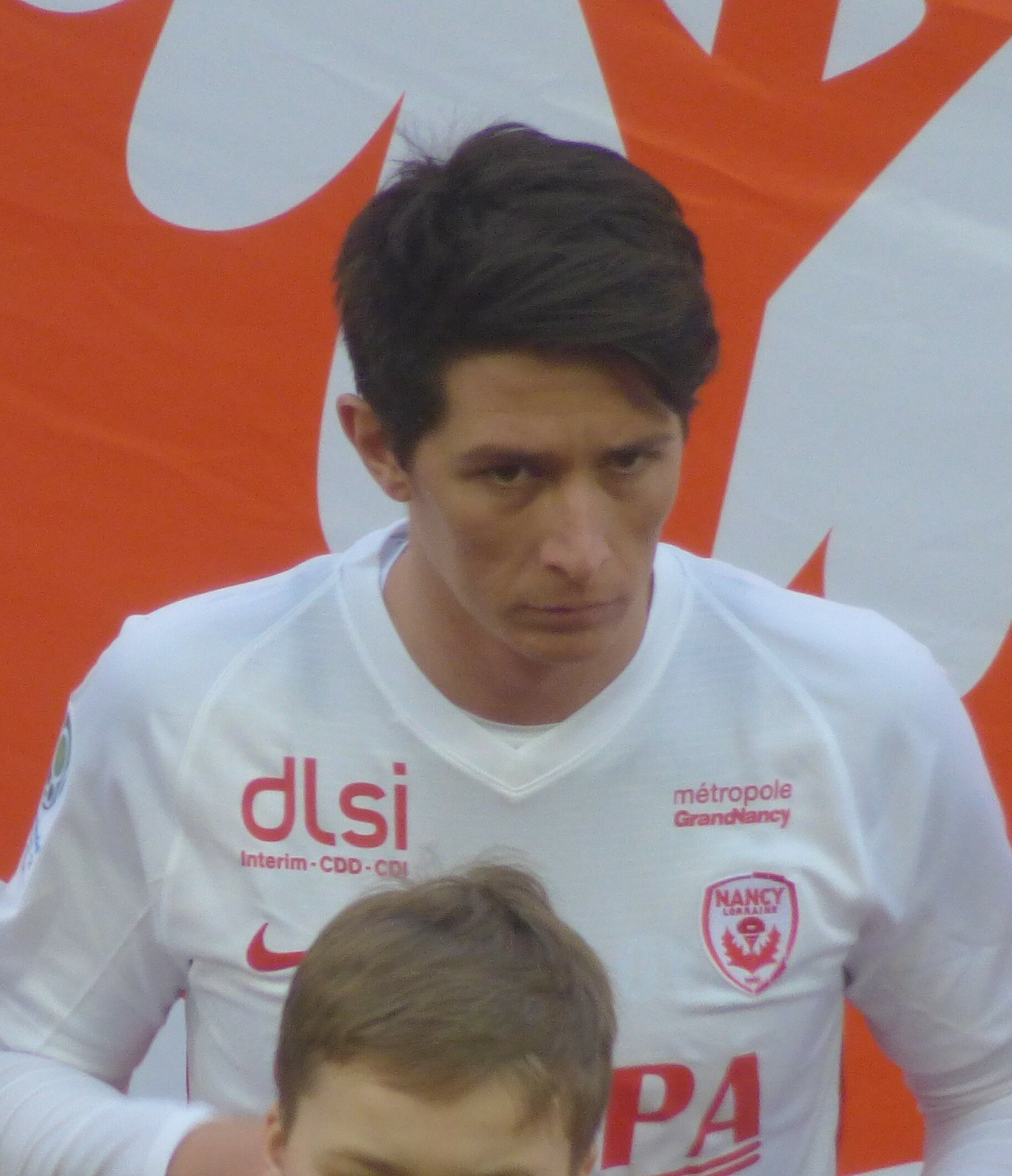
- Abergel in 2019

Personal information
- Date of birth: 1 February 1993 (age 33)
- Place of birth: Marseille, France
- Height: 1.70 m (5 ft 7 in)
- Position: Defensive midfielder

Team information
- Current team: Nice
- Number: 19

Youth career
- –2012: Marseille

Senior career*
Years	Team	Apps	(Gls)
2012–2015	Marseille B	40	(2)
2014–2015	Marseille	1	(0)
2014	→ Ajaccio B (loan)	2	(0)
2014–2015	→ Ajaccio (loan)	17	(0)
2015–2017	Ajaccio	59	(2)
2017–2019	Nancy	60	(2)
2019–2026	Lorient	219	(9)
2026–	Nice	0	(0)
- * Club domestic league appearances and goals as of 19 May 2026

Laurent Abergel (born 1 February 1993) is a French professional footballer who plays as a defensive midfielder for Ligue 1 club Nice.

== Career ==
Abergel, born to Jewish parents, is a youth exponent from Marseille. On 25 June 2013, he signed a three-year deal with Marseille. In July 2013, he was promoted to the first team. He made his professional debut for Marseille on 5 January 2014 in a Coupe de France game against Reims entering the field after 105 minutes as a substitute for Kassim Abdallah.

He was loaned out to Ligue 2 side AC Ajaccio for the 2014–15 season.

On 31 July 2015, Abergel signed a two-year contract with Ajaccio.

On 8 July 2017, after the expiration of his contract with Ajaccio, Abergel signed with Nancy on a three-year contract.

In July 2019, Abergel joined Ligue 2 club Lorient on a three-year contract.

On 2 July 2026, Abergel moved to Nice in Ligue 1.

== Career statistics ==
As of 10 May 2025

Appearances and goals by club, season and competition
Club	Season	League			National cup		League cup		Other		Total	
Club	Season	Division	Apps	Goals	Apps	Goals	Apps	Goals	Apps	Goals	Apps	Goals
Marseille B	2012–13	CFA 2	22	1	—		—		—		22	1
Marseille B	2013–14	CFA 2	17	1	—		—		—		17	1
Marseille B	2014–15	CFA 2	1	0	—		—		—		1	0
Marseille B	Total		40	2	—		—		—		40	1
Marseille	2013–14	Ligue 1	1	0	1	0	0	0	0	0	2	0
Ajaccio B (loan)	2014–15	CFA 2	2	0	—		—		—		2	0
Ajaccio (loan)	2014–15	Ligue 2	17	0	2	0	2	0	—		21	0
Ajaccio	2015–16	Ligue 2	22	1	3	0	0	0	—		25	1
Ajaccio	2016–17	Ligue 2	37	1	2	0	1	0	—		40	1
Ajaccio	Total		76	2	7	0	3	0	—		86	2
Nancy	2017–18	Ligue 2	31	1	2	0	2	0	—		35	1
Nancy	2018–19	Ligue 2	29	1	3	0	0	0	—		32	1
Nancy	Total		60	2	5	0	2	0	—		67	2
Lorient	2019–20	Ligue 2	25	2	4	0	1	0	—		30	2
Lorient	2020–21	Ligue 1	38	3	2	0	—		—		40	3
Lorient	2021–22	Ligue 1	34	0	1	0	—		—		35	0
Lorient	2022–23	Ligue 1	29	0	2	0	—		—		31	0
Lorient	2023–24	Ligue 1	33	2	1	0	—		—		34	2
Lorient	2024–25	Ligue 2	32	1	1	0	—		—		33	1
Lorient	Total		191	8	11	0	1	0	—		203	8
Career total			387	14	26	0	8	0	0	0	421	14

== Honours ==
Lorient

- Ligue 2: 2019–20, 2024–25

Individual

- UNFP Ligue 2 Team of the Year: 2024–25
