= Armand Laurienté =

French footballer (born 1998)

Personal information
- Date of birth: 4 December 1998 (age 27)
- Place of birth: Gonesse, France
- Height: 1.71 m (5 ft 7 in)
- Positions: Forward; left winger

Team information
- Current team: Sassuolo
- Number: 45

Youth career
- 2004–2011: Roissy-en-France
- 2011–2012: Sarcelles
- 2012–2013: Red Star
- 2013–2016: Rennes

Senior career*
Years	Team	Apps	(Gls)
2016–2019	Rennes II	21	(7)
2018–2020	Rennes	1	(0)
2018–2019	→ Orléans (loan)	12	(3)
2019	→ Lorient II (loan)	1	(0)
2019–2020	→ Lorient (loan)	19	(2)
2020–2022	Lorient	67	(10)
2022–	Sassuolo	146	(39)

International career^{‡}
2021	France U21	1	(0)
- * Club domestic league appearances and goals as of 22:17, 2 November 2026 (UTC) ‡ National team caps and goals as of 25 March 2021

Armand Gaëtan Laurienté (born 4 December 1998) is a professional footballer who plays as a forward or left winger for Serie A club Sassuolo.

== Career ==
Born in metropolitan France, Laurienté is of Guadeloupean descent. On 23 July 2018, he signed his first professional contract with Rennes and immediately went on loan to Orléans in Ligue 2. Laurienté made his professional debut with the club in a 2–0 league loss against Lens on 27 July. Laurienté moved to FC Lorient the following season on loan and returned to Rennes in January 2019. He moved to FC Lorient on another loan the following season and joined them permanently. On 31 August 2022, Laurienté signed with Sassuolo in Italy.

== Career statistics ==
=== Club ===
As of match played 2 November 2026

Appearances and goals by club, season and competition
Club	Season	League			National cup (Note: Includes Coupe de France, Coppa Italia)		Total	
Club	Season	Division	Apps	Goals	Apps	Goals	Apps	Goals
Rennes	2018–19	Ligue 1	1	0	1	0	2	0
Lorient (loan)	2019–20	Ligue 2	19	2	4	1	23	3
Lorient	2020–21	Ligue 1	29	3	0	0	29	3
Lorient	2021–22	Ligue 1	35	6	1	0	36	6
Lorient	2022–23	Ligue 1	3	1	0	0	3	1
Lorient	Lorient total		86	12	5	1	91	13
Sassuolo	2022–23	Serie A	28	7	0	0	28	7
Sassuolo	2023–24	Serie A	37	5	3	0	40	5
Sassuolo	2024–25	Serie B	33	18	1	1	34	19
Sassuolo	2025–26	Serie A	38	7	1	0	39	7
Sassuolo	2026–27	Serie A	10	2	2	0	12	2
Sassuolo	Total		146	39	7	1	153	40
Career total			233	51	13	2	246	53

== Honours ==
Sassuolo

- Serie B: 2024–25
