= Trevoh Chalobah =

English footballer (born 1999)

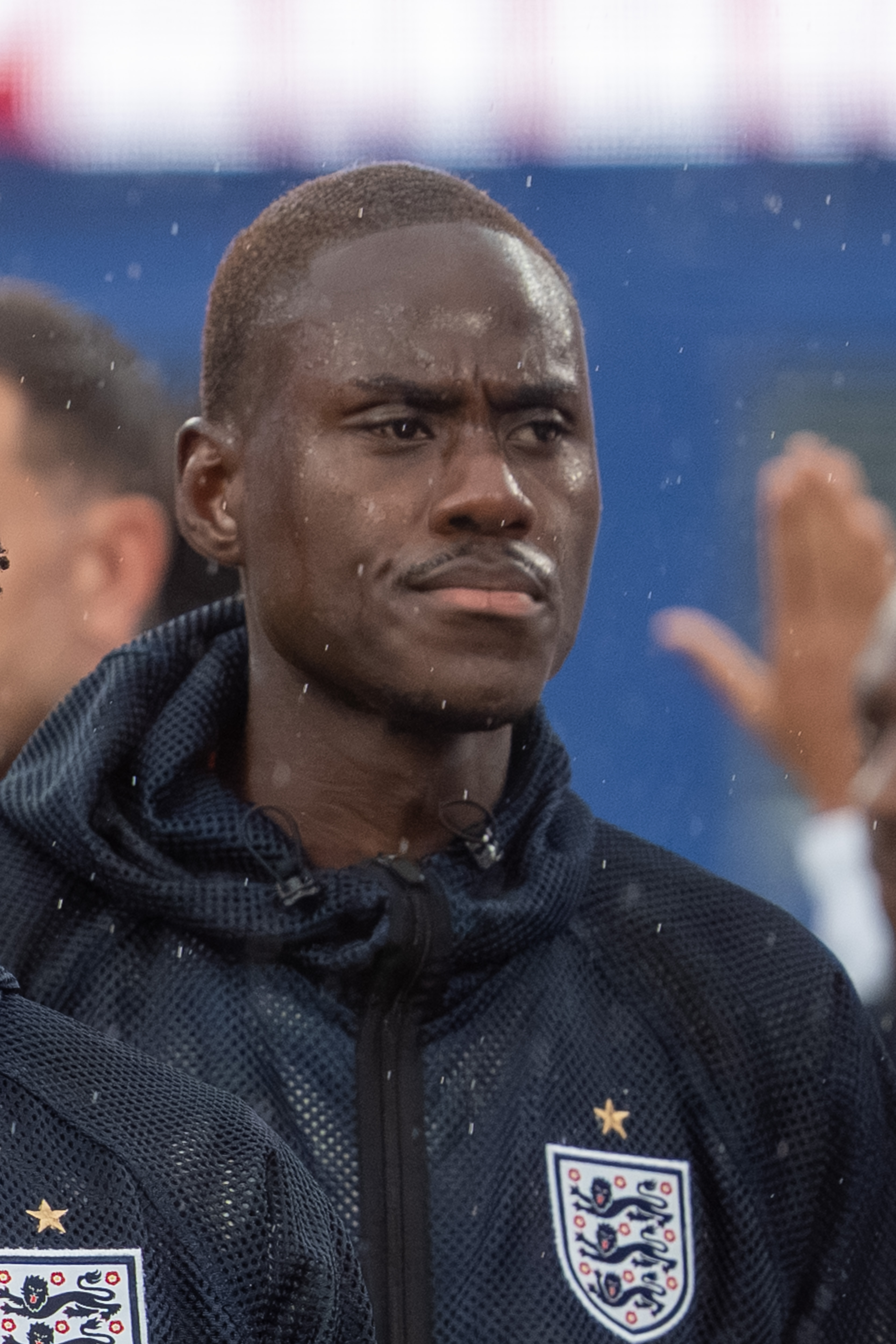
- Chalobah with England in 2026

Personal information
- Full name: Trevoh Tom Chalobah
- Date of birth: 5 July 1999 (age 27)
- Place of birth: Freetown, Sierra Leone
- Height: 6 ft 4 in (1.92 m)
- Position: Centre-back

Team information
- Current team: Como
- Number: 99

Youth career
- 2007–2018: Chelsea

Senior career*
Years	Team	Apps	(Gls)
2018–2026	Chelsea	105	(7)
2018–2019	→ Ipswich Town (loan)	43	(2)
2019–2020	→ Huddersfield Town (loan)	36	(1)
2020–2021	→ Lorient (loan)	29	(2)
2024–2025	→ Crystal Palace (loan)	12	(3)
2026–	Como	6	(0)

International career^{‡}
2014–2015	England U16	9	(0)
2015–2016	England U17	15	(1)
2016–2018	England U19	25	(1)
2018–2019	England U20	6	(1)
2019	England U21	3	(0)
2025–	England	3	(0)
Medal record
Men's football
Representing England
FIFA World Cup
Third place	2026 Canada–Mexico–US
- * Club domestic league appearances and goals as of 22:15, 18 October 2026 (UTC) ‡ National team caps and goals as of 21:10, 29 September 2026 (UTC)

Trevoh Tom Chalobah (born 5 July 1999) is a professional footballer who plays as a centre-back for Serie A club Como. Born in Sierra Leone, he plays for the England national team.

Chalobah is a centre-back who joined Chelsea at the age of eight and progressed through the club's academy. He spent time out on loan with Ipswich Town, Huddersfield Town and French side Lorient. He made his senior debut for Chelsea in the 2021 UEFA Super Cup, helping the club lift the trophy following a penalty shoot-out win.

He has represented England at various youth levels from under-16 to under-21 level. In 2017, he helped England win the 2017 UEFA European Under-19 Championship.

== Early life ==
Trevoh Tom Chalobah was born on 5 July 1999 in Freetown, Sierra Leone. Chalobah moved to England at the age of two and grew up in Gipsy Hill in the London Borough of Lambeth. His older brother Nathaniel is also a footballer.

== Club career ==
=== Chelsea ===
==== Early career ====
Chalobah joined Chelsea at the age of eight. He signed his first professional contract in March 2018. His youth honours at Chelsea include the UEFA Youth League in 2015–16, the FA Youth Cup in 2015–16 and 2016–17, and the Under-18 Premier League in 2016–17.

Chalobah was named by Antonio Conte as a substitute for the 2018 FA Cup final victory against Manchester United on 19 May 2018 at Wembley, despite never having previously played a professional game. Chelsea won the match 1–0, and Chalobah did not enter the field.

==== 2018–2021: Loans to other clubs ====
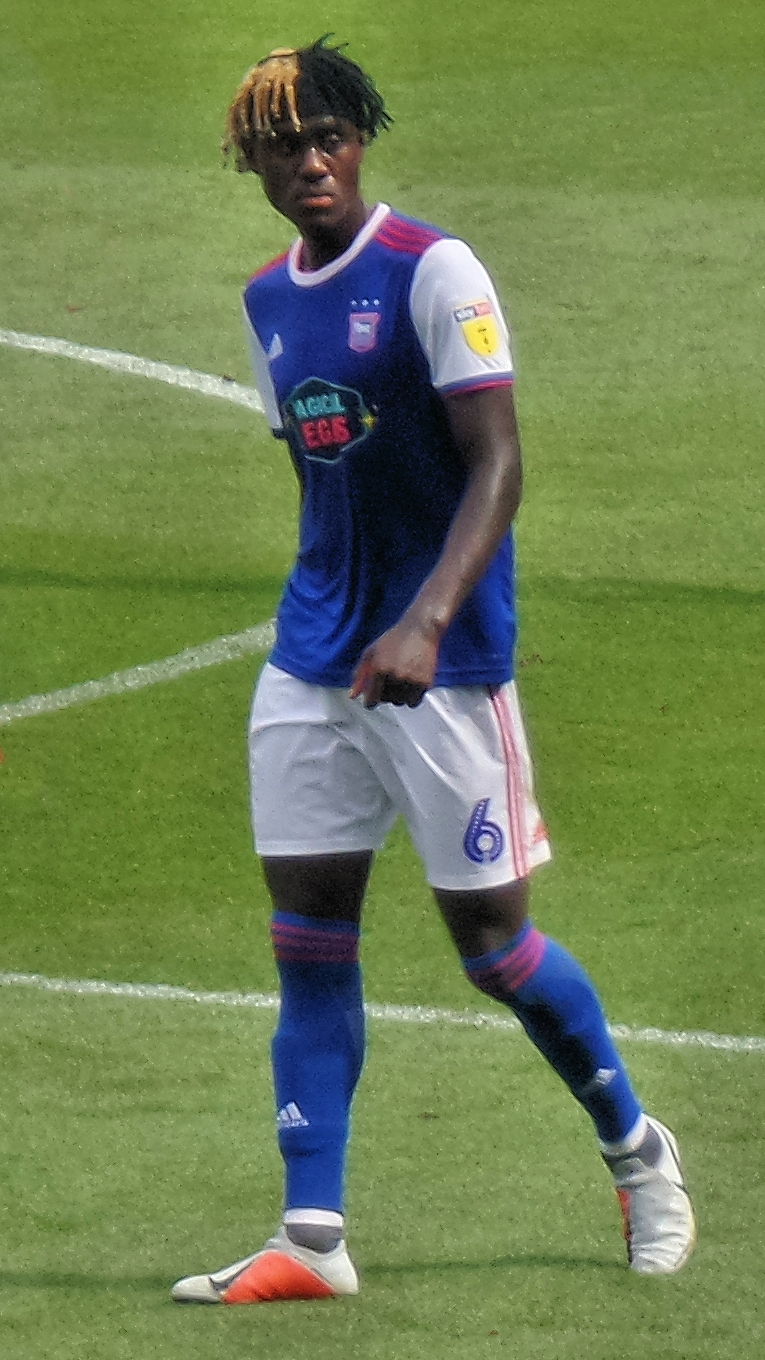
Chalobah playing for Ipswich Town in 2018

He signed for Championship club Ipswich Town on a season-long loan deal in June 2018. He made his professional debut on 4 August, starting in a 2–2 draw with Blackburn Rovers. Two weeks later he scored his first senior goal, equalising in a 1–1 draw with Aston Villa at Portman Road. On 6 October, he scored a late winner in a 3–2 win against Swansea City, earning Ipswich their first league win of the season. Despite primarily playing as a centre-back during his time in the Chelsea academy, he played as a central midfielder for Ipswich during his first season in senior football. Chalobah featured regularly for Ipswich during the 2018–19 season, playing 44 matches and scoring two goals for the team, who were relegated to League One.

On 8 August 2019, Chalobah signed a new contract with Chelsea through to the 2022 season, and began a season-long loan at Huddersfield Town. He made his debut five days later in a 1–0 home loss to Lincoln City in the first round of the EFL Cup, playing the full 90 minutes. He scored his first goal for Huddersfield on 21 August against Cardiff City, initially equalising to level the score at 1–1, in a match that Huddersfield went on to lose 2–1. He made 38 appearances in all competitions for Huddersfield during the season, scoring once.

On 18 August 2020, Chalobah signed a new contract with Chelsea until 2023 and joined French side Lorient on loan for the 2020–21 season. He made his league debut as a substitute on 13 September, in a 3–2 loss against Lens. He scored his first goal for Lorient on 27 January, netting the opening goal in a 3–2 win against Dijon. Chalobah had another productive loan spell at Lorient, scoring 2 goals in 30 appearances, including scoring on the final day of the season in a 1–1 draw against Strasbourg.

==== 2021–2024: Return to Chelsea ====
On 11 August 2021, Chalobah made his debut for Chelsea in the 2021 UEFA Super Cup against Villarreal, as his side won 6–5 in a penalty shoot-out after the match finished in a 1–1 draw after extra time. Three days later, he made his Premier League debut in Chelsea's opening match of the season against Crystal Palace, in which he also scored his first Premier League goal in a 3–0 win. On 4 November, Chalobah signed a new contract with Chelsea, keeping him at the club until 2026. On 23 November, he scored his first UEFA Champions League goal, with the opener in a 4–0 home win against Juventus.

On 29 October 2022, Chalobah scored an own goal in Chelsea's 4–1 defeat away to Brighton & Hove Albion in the Premier League. This was the first defeat in his Chelsea career.

==== Loan to Crystal Palace and half-season return ====
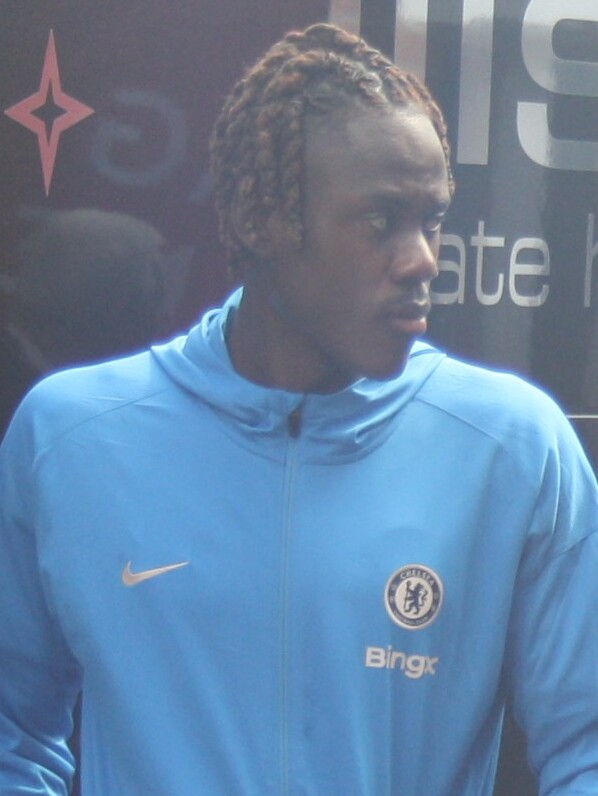
Chalobah with Chelsea in 2025

On 30 August 2024, Chalobah joined Crystal Palace on a season-long loan. On 15 January 2025, he was recalled by Chelsea due to injuries in defensive positions. Upon the completion of the loan deal, Chalobah had played 14 times for Crystal Palace, scoring on three occasions, with 12 of those appearances and all three goals coming in the Premier League.

=== Como ===
On 9 August 2026, Chalobah signed for Serie A club Como on a deal until 2031.

== International career ==
He has represented England at youth level from under-16 to under-20, captaining all four teams at various stages. In November 2014, Chalobah captained the England under-16 team against Scotland in the Victory Shield. In May 2016, Chalobah was captain of the England under-17 team that lost to Spain in the quarter-final of the 2016 UEFA European Under-17 Championship.

Chalobah was included in the England under-19 squad for the 2017 UEFA European Under-19 Championship. An ankle injury sustained in the final group game against Germany ruled him out for the rest of the tournament. England went on to defeat Portugal in the final.

On 30 August 2019, he was included in the England U21 squad for the first time and made his debut during the 3–2 2021 UEFA European Under-21 Championship qualifying win against Turkey on 6 September 2019.

On 23 May 2025, he received his first senior call up for England, and went on to make his debut during a 3–1 defeat to Senegal at the City Ground on 10 June 2025.

On 16 June 2026, Chalobah was called up to the England World Cup squad by Thomas Tuchel to replace the injured Tino Livramento. Chalobah made his World Cup debut on 18 July 2026, coming on as a 93rd minute substitute in England's 6-4 third place playoff win over France.

== Career statistics ==
=== Club ===
As of match played 18 October 2026

Appearances and goals by club, season and competition
Club	Season	League			National cup (Note: Includes FA Cup, Coupe de France)		League cup (Note: Includes EFL Cup)		Europe		Other		Total	
Club	Season	Division	Apps	Goals	Apps	Goals	Apps	Goals	Apps	Goals	Apps	Goals	Apps	Goals
Chelsea U23/U21	2016–17	—			—		—		—		2 (Note: Appearances in EFL Trophy)	0	2	0
Chelsea U23/U21	2017–18	—			—		—		—		6	0	6	0
Chelsea U23/U21	Total		—		—		—		—		8	0	8	0
Ipswich Town (loan)	2018–19	Championship	43	2	0	0	1	0	—		—		44	2
Huddersfield Town (loan)	2019–20	Championship	36	1	1	0	1	0	—		—		38	1
Lorient (loan)	2020–21	Ligue 1	29	2	1	0	—		—		—		30	2
Chelsea	2021–22	Premier League	20	3	2	0	4	0	3 (Note: Appearances in UEFA Champions League)	1	1 (Note: Appearance in UEFA Super Cup)	0	30	4
Chelsea	2022–23	Premier League	25	0	1	0	1	0	6	0	—		33	0
Chelsea	2023–24	Premier League	13	1	3	0	1	0	—		—		17	1
Chelsea	2024–25	Premier League	13	0	1	0	—		5 (Note: Appearances in UEFA Conference League)	0	5 (Note: Appearances in FIFA Club World Cup)	0	24	0
Chelsea	2025–26	Premier League	34	3	1	0	4	0	8	0	—		47	3
Chelsea	Total		105	7	8	0	10	0	22	1	6	0	151	8
Crystal Palace (loan)	2024–25	Premier League	12	3	0	0	2	0	—		—		14	3
Como	2026–27	Serie A	6	0	0	0	—		2	0	—		8	0
Career total			231	15	10	0	14	0	24	1	14	0	293	16

=== International ===
As of match played 29 September 2026

Appearances and goals by national team and year
National team	Year	Apps	Goals
England	2025	1	0
England	2026	2	0
Total		3	0

== Honours ==
Chelsea

- FA Cup: 2017–18; runner-up: 2021–22, 2025–26
- UEFA Conference League: 2024–25
- UEFA Super Cup: 2021
- FIFA Club World Cup: 2021, 2025
- EFL Cup runner-up: 2021–22, 2023–24

England U19

- UEFA European Under-19 Championship: 2017

England

- FIFA World Cup third place: 2026
