= Pierre-Yves Hamel =

French footballer (born 1994)

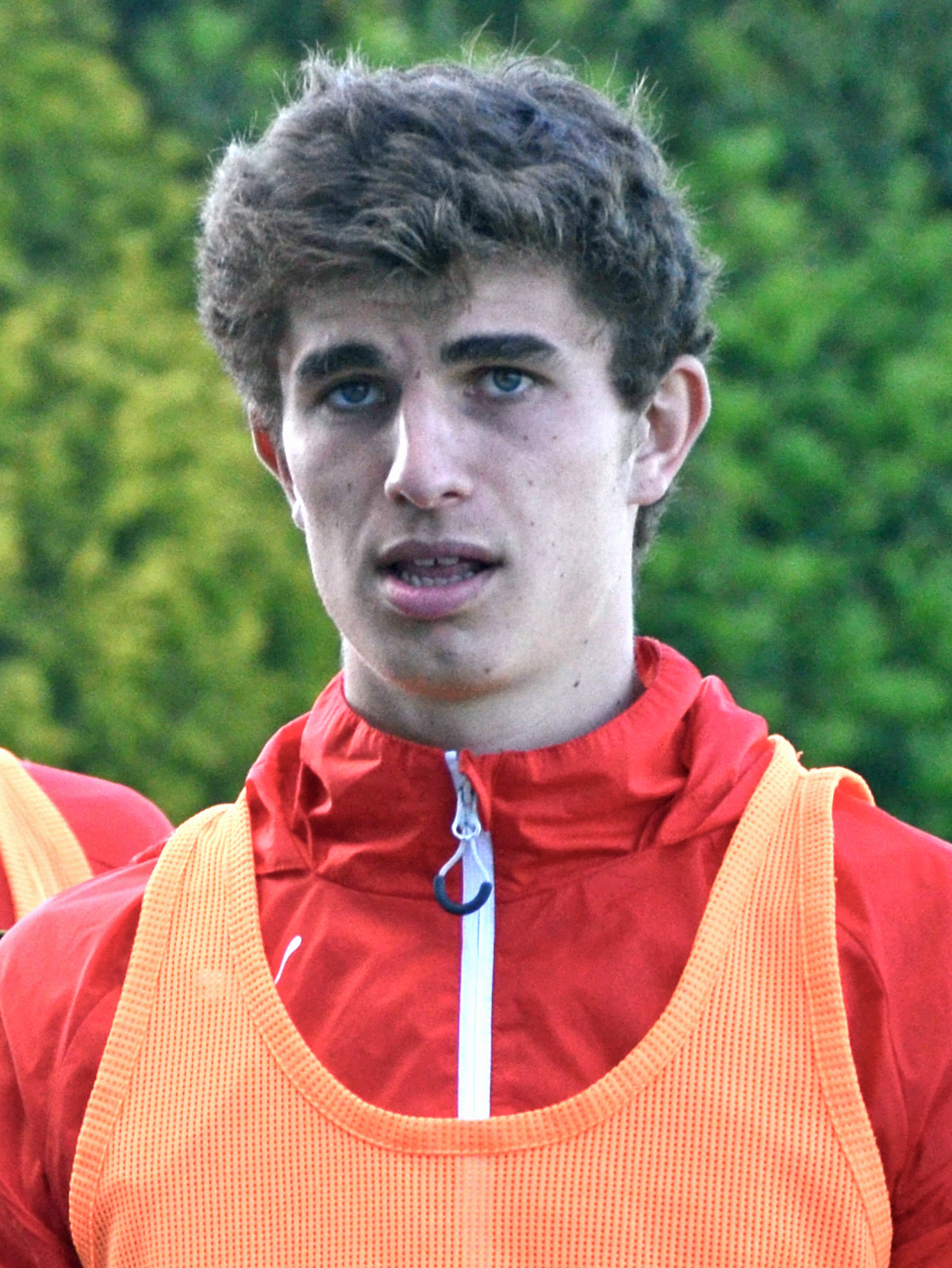
- Hamel in 2015

Personal information
- Date of birth: 3 February 1994 (age 32)
- Place of birth: Brest, France
- Height: 1.89 m (6 ft 2 in)
- Position: Forward

Youth career
- 2001–2007: RC Lesneven
- 2007–2009: FC Landerneau
- 2009–2014: Rennes

Senior career*
Years	Team	Apps	(Gls)
2013–2015	Rennes B	38	(19)
2015–2016	Avranches	2	(0)
2016–2017	Lorient B	32	(8)
2016–2022	Lorient	121	(43)
2021–2022	→ Clermont (loan)	17	(0)
2022–2026	Paris FC	63	(15)
2023	Paris FC B	2	(1)
- * Club domestic league appearances and goals as of 19 May 2026

Pierre-Yves Hamel (born 3 February 1994) is a French professional footballer who plays as a forward.

== Career ==
=== Early career ===
Born in Brest and having grown up in nearby Lesneven, Hamel played for RC Lesneven and FC Landerneau as a youth player before joining the academy of Rennes. While at Landerneau, Hamel was also training at the PEF Ploufragan, a centre which produced future Lorient teammate Sylvain Marveaux. He played in the Coupe Gambardella, an under-19 tournament, with Rennes in 2012. Hamel made his debut with the reserves in 2013 in the Championnat de France Amateur 2, the fifth tier of French football. That summer, Hamel took part in an under-21 tournament in Ploufragan, in which Rennes was victorious and Hamel was voted best player. He spent the next season with the reserves, captaining the side and scoring 7 goals in 14 games, missing half the season with injury. Hamel signed his first professional contract in April 2014.

Hamel was not involved in the first-team by manager Philippe Montanier and had a loan request denied, instead playing with the reserves, scoring 8 goals in 20 games. At the end of the season, his contract was not renewed, and Hamel signed with Avranches in the third-tier. He appeared from the start on the opening day against Béziers, but did not play for the first-team after August, and left the club in the winter.

=== Lorient ===
On 7 January 2016, Hamel signed with Lorient of Ligue 1, and was assigned to the reserves in the fourth-tier, where he was reunited with former trainer at the Rennes academy Régis Le Bris. He scored 3 goals in 12 games, and began the next season with the reserves as well. Hamel was given his senior Lorient debut by manager Sylvain Ripoll on 15 October against Nantes, scoring off the bench in a 2–1 defeat. On 29 January 2017, Hamel signed a contract extension with Lorient, keeping him at the club until 2019. Hamel made four appearances with the first-team in all competitions, but played in 19 games for the reserves, scoring five goals. Lorient were relegated to Ligue 2 after losing a play-off with Troyes.

Behind Gaëtan Courtet and then Majeed Waris at centre-forward, Hamel was given an opportunity in the 2017–18 Coupe de France, where he scored a hat-trick against seventh-tier side Stella Maris Douarnenez on 12 November. Hamel was given his first start of the season the following week by manager Mickaël Landreau, scoring a brace along with an assist against Brest in a 4–2 victory. He scored in his next appearance against Nîmes, winding up with 7 goals in his first 10 starts. On 14 March 2018, Hamel signed another contract extension, this time until 2021. He finished the season with 10 goals in 29 appearances, enough to lead the team, as Lorient finished the season in seventh.

Hamel scored 10 goals in the first half of the 2018–19 season, having cemented a role as Lorient's preferred centre-forward. He scored his first goal after a two-month drought against Red Star, setting off a run of five goals in four matches. He finished the season as Lorient's top scorer with 19 goals, good for third in the league, as the club finished in sixth, level on points with the promotion play-off places.

Hamel signed another extension with Lorient after three games of the 2019–20 season, until 2023. He had just three goals entering November, but finished the first half of the season with seven goals. The emergence of Yann Kitala somewhat cut into his playing time, and at the time of the suspension of the season, Hamel had 9 goals in 26 games, second behind Yoane Wissa, but did have a career high 5 assists. Lorient were promoted to Ligue 1 as champions, ending a three-year spell outside of the top-flight.

==== Loan to Clermont ====
On 31 August 2021, he joined Clermont on loan for the 2021–22 season.

=== Paris FC ===
On 24 June 2022, Hamel signed a four-year contract with Paris FC.

== Style of play ==
Often compared to Thomas Müller, Hamel describes his game as taking place in the last thirty metres, making a difference with his movement.

== Personal life ==
Hamel comes from a footballing family; his maternal grandfather played in Division 1 with Rennes, while both his father and paternal grandfather played at Avranches. He grew up supporting Brest, where his father was a youth coach. He initially played handball before football, and can speak Breton. When Pape Paye left Lorient in 2017, Hamel claimed his shirt number of 29, which he wears to represent his home department of Finistère.

== Career statistics ==
As of match played 21 May 2024

Appearances and goals by club, season and competition
Club	Season	League			National cup		League cup		Other		Total	
Club	Season	Division	Apps	Goals	Apps	Goals	Apps	Goals	Apps	Goals	Apps	Goals
Rennes B	2012–13	CFA 2	4	4	—		—		—		4	4
Rennes B	2013–14	CFA 2	14	7	—		—		—		14	7
Rennes B	2014–15	CFA 2	20	8	—		—		—		20	8
Rennes B	Total		38	19	—		—		—		38	19
Avranches	2015–16	National	2	0	0	0	—		—		2	0
Lorient B	2015–16	CFA	12	3	—		—		—		12	3
Lorient B	2016–17	CFA	19	5	—		—		—		19	5
Lorient B	2017–18	National 2	1	0	—		—		—		1	0
Lorient B	Total		32	8	—		—		—		32	8
Lorient	2016–17	Ligue 1	3	1	0	0	1	0	—		4	1
Lorient	2017–18	Ligue 2	29	10	3	4	2	0	—		34	14
Lorient	2018–19	Ligue 2	37	19	0	0	1	0	—		38	19
Lorient	2019–20	Ligue 2	26	9	2	0	1	1	—		29	10
Lorient	2020–21	Ligue 1	23	4	2	0	—		—		25	4
Lorient	2021–22	Ligue 1	3	0	0	0	—		—		3	0
Lorient	Total		121	43	7	4	5	1	—		133	48
Clermont (loan)	2021–22	Ligue 1	17	0	1	0	—		—		18	0
Paris FC	2022–23	Ligue 2	17	2	0	0	—		—		17	2
Paris FC	2023–24	Ligue 2	21	8	0	0	—		1 (Note: Appearance in the Ligue 2 promotion play-offs)	0	22	8
Paris FC	Total		38	10	0	0	—		1	0	39	10
Paris FC B	2022–23	National 3	2	1	—		—		—		2	1
Career total			250	81	8	4	5	1	1	0	264	86

== Honours ==
Lorient

- Ligue 2: 2019–20
