= Jérémy Morel =

Malagasy footballer (born 1984)

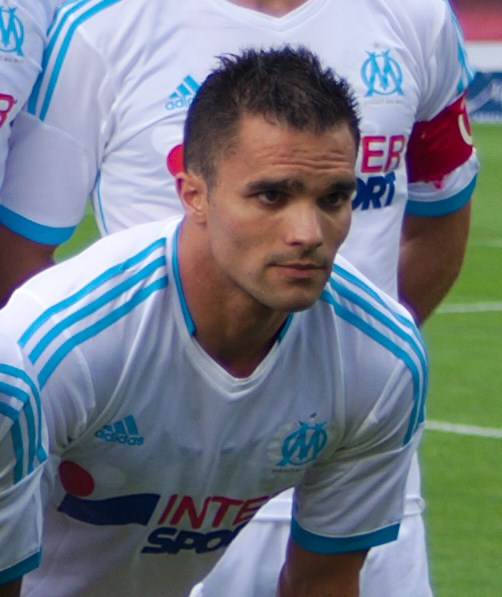
- Morel with Marseille in 2013

Personal information
- Date of birth: 2 April 1984 (age 42)
- Place of birth: Lorient, France
- Height: 1.73 m (5 ft 8 in)
- Position: Centre-back

Youth career
- 1994–2002: Lorient

Senior career*
Years	Team	Apps	(Gls)
2002–2011	Lorient	214	(12)
2011–2015	Marseille	120	(2)
2015–2019	Lyon	105	(0)
2019–2020	Rennes	21	(1)
2020–2022	Lorient	37	(0)
2022–2023	Montagnarde	18	(0)

International career^{‡}
2018–2023	Madagascar	15	(1)
- * Club domestic league appearances and goals as of 28 October 2023 (UTC) ‡ National team caps and goals as of 28 October 2023

Jérémy Morel (born 2 April 1984) is a former professional footballer who plays as a centre-back. Born in France, he played for the Madagascar national team.

== Club career ==
=== Lorient ===
Born in Lorient to a Malagasy father and a French mother, Morel made his senior debut for FC Lorient at the age of 19, coming on as a substitute for Pape Malick Diop in Lorient's Ligue 2 1–0 defeat at home to FC Gueugnon on 19 April 2003. He played only one other match (a Ligue 2 match) in the 2002–03 season. In the next three seasons, he progressively played more matches for Lorient. Morel played 28 matches in Lorient's 2005–06 Ligue 2 season in which Lorient finished in third position; they were thus promoted to Ligue 1 for the 2006–07 season.

=== Marseille ===
On 19 June 2011, Morel ended his nine-year senior spell with Lorient to join Ligue 1 club Olympique de Marseille, signing a contract that would last until 30 June 2015.

=== Lyon ===
On 1 June 2015, Morel Joined Olympique Lyonnais on a three-year contract.

On 13 April 2017, Morel pinched the ball from goalkeeper Fabri in the penalty area and tapped it into an empty net in the 84th minute for the final goal of Lyon's 2–1 home 2016–17 UEFA Europa League quarterfinal first-leg win against Beşiktaş; it was his first career competitive goal for Lyon and the first UEFA club competition goal of his club career, coming in his 33rd UEFA club competition match, having played 23 matches in the UEFA Champions League and 10 matches in the UEFA Europa League for both Marseille and Lyon.

=== Rennes ===
On 16 July 2019, Morel left Lyon upon the ending of his contract and joined Rennes on a one-year deal.

=== Lorient ===
In summer 2020, Morel rejoined his boyhood club FC Lorient on a free transfer, signing a one-year deal with an option for another year. Lorient was newly promoted to Ligue 1 after finishing at the top at the end of the 2019–20 Ligue 2 season. He left Lorient on 26 August 2022, one of four players to do so that day, alongside Houboulang Mendes, Fabien Lemoine and Jérôme Hergault.

== International career ==
On 28 October 2018, Morel announced that he would represent the Madagascar national team, the birth country of his father. He made his debut for Madagascar on 18 November 2018 in an Africa Cup of Nations qualifier against Sudan.

He played at 2019 Africa Cup of Nations when Madagascar made a sensational advance to the quarterfinals.

== Career statistics ==
As of match played on 14 November 2021

Appearances and goals by national team and year
National team	Year	Apps	Goals
Madagascar	2018	1	0
Madagascar	2019	5	1
Madagascar	2020	3	0
Madagascar	2021	2	0
Total		11	1

Scores and results list Madagascar's goal tally first, score column indicates score after each Morel goal.

List of international goals scored by Jérémy Morel
No.	Date	Venue	Opponent	Score	Result	Competition
1	19 November 2019	Stade Général Seyni Kountché, Niamey, Niger	Niger	6–1	6–2	2021 Africa Cup of Nations qualification

== Honours ==
Marseille

- Trophée des Champions: 2011
- Coupe de la Ligue: 2011–12

Individual

- UEFA Europa League Squad of the Season: 2016–17
