= Teddy Bartouche =

Guadeloupean footballer (born 1997)

Personal information
- Full name: Teddy Bartouche-Selbonne
- Date of birth: 12 November 1997 (age 29)
- Place of birth: Lagny-sur-Marne, France
- Height: 1.78 m (5 ft 10 in)
- Position: Goalkeeper

Team information
- Current team: Guingamp
- Number: 1

Youth career
- Lognes
- Torcy
- Drancy

Senior career*
Years	Team	Apps	(Gls)
2016–2017	Drancy	0	(0)
2017–2023	Lorient II	56	(0)
2018–2023	Lorient	0	(0)
2023–	Guingamp	14	(0)
2023–	Guingamp B	10	(0)

International career^{‡}
2023–	Guadeloupe	3	(0)
- * Club domestic league appearances and goals as of 11 May 2026 ‡ National team caps and goals as of 2 December 2025

Teddy Bartouche-Selbonne (born 5 June 1997) is a professional footballer who plays as a goalkeeper for Ligue 2 club Guingamp. Born in Metropolitan France, he plays for the Guadeloupe national team.

== Career ==
After beginning his senior career with JA Drancy, Bartouche signed his first professional contract with FC Lorient on 9 January 2020. He made his professional debut with Lorient in a 2–1 Coupe de France win over Paris FC on 2 February 2021. On 1 August 2023, he moved to Guingamp in the Ligue 2.

== International career ==
Born in Metropolitan France, Bartouche is of Guadeloupean and Martiniquais descent. He was called up to the Guadeloupe national team for 2023–24 CONCACAF Nations League matches in September 2023.
