= Fabien Lemoine =

French footballer (born 1987)

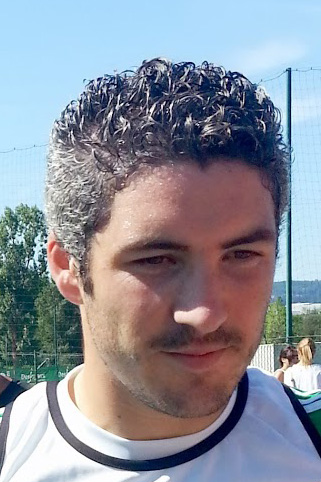
- Lemoine with Saint-Étienne

Personal information
- Date of birth: 16 March 1987 (age 39)
- Place of birth: Fougères, France
- Height: 1.75 m (5 ft 9 in)
- Position: Midfielder

Youth career
- 1993–1999: Stéphanais-Briçois
- 1999–2000: AGL Fougères
- 2000–2007: Rennes

Senior career*
Years	Team	Apps	(Gls)
2007–2011	Rennes	105	(1)
2010–2011	Rennes B	4	(1)
2011–2017	Saint-Étienne	181	(5)
2012–2017	Saint-Étienne B	3	(0)
2017–2022	Lorient	140	(4)
2022–2023	Versailles	25	(1)
Total		458	(12)

International career
2008	France U21	1	(0)
- * Club domestic league appearances and goals

Fabien Lemoine (born 16 March 1987) is a French former professional footballer who played as a midfielder. Across his career, he played for Rennes, Saint-Étienne, Lorient, and Versailles.

== Club career ==
Lemoine made his professional league debut for Rennes on 13 January 2008, he made a total of 18 league appearances during his first season. Lemoine joined Saint-Étienne in 2011 and remained at the club for six years. In 2017, Lemoine joined Ligue 2 club Lorient. The club was promoted to top-flight Ligue 1 for the 2020-2021 season.

Lemoine left Lorient on 26 August 2022, one of four players to do so that day, alongside Houboulang Mendes, Jérôme Hergault and Jérémy Morel. In September 2022 he signed for Versailles.

On 18 July 2023, Lemoine announced his retirement from football.

== Honours ==
Saint-Étienne

- Coupe de la Ligue: 2012–13

Lorient

- Ligue 2 : 2019–20

Stade Rennais

- Coupe de France: finalist 2008–09
