= Jonathan Delaplace =

French footballer (born 1986)

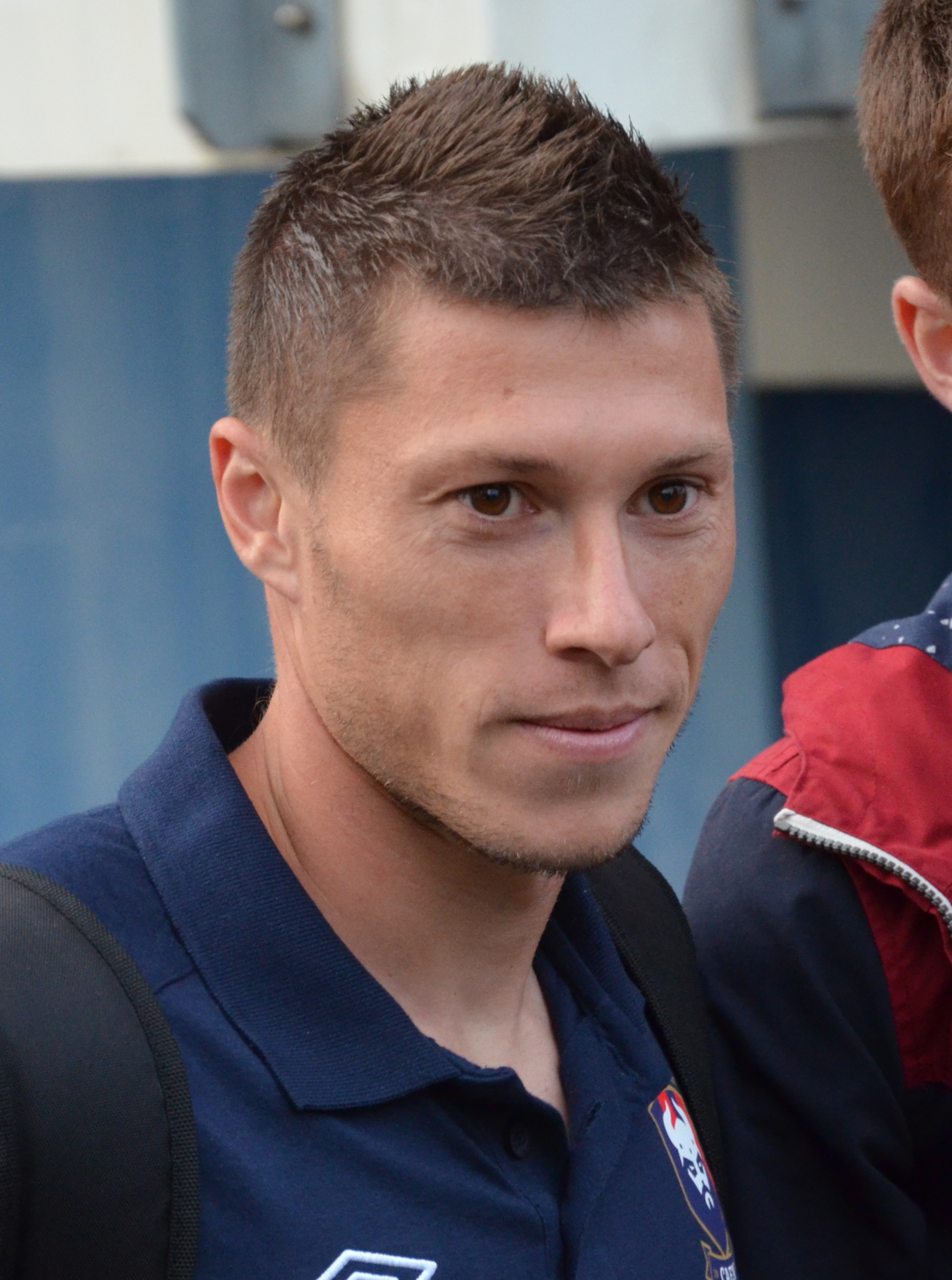
- Delaplace in 2016.

Personal information
- Date of birth: 20 March 1986 (age 40)
- Place of birth: La Seyne-sur-Mer, France
- Height: 1.67 m (5 ft 6 in)
- Position: Midfielder

Senior career*
Years	Team	Apps	(Gls)
2004–2007	Hyères	0	(0)
2007–2009	ES Fréjus	30	(4)
2009–2010	Fréjus Saint-Raphaël	52	(5)
2010–2013	Zulte Waregem	98	(5)
2013–2015	Lille	39	(3)
2015–2018	Caen	61	(0)
2018–2021	Lorient	45	(0)
Total		325	(17)
- * Club domestic league appearances and goals

Jonathan Delaplace (born 20 March 1986) is a French former professional footballer who plays as a midfielder.
