= Thomas Callens =

French footballer (born 1998)

Personal information
- Date of birth: 6 September 1998 (age 28)
- Place of birth: Brest, France
- Height: 1.82 m (6 ft 0 in)
- Position: Goalkeeper

Team information
- Current team: Annecy
- Number: 16

Youth career
- 2006–2015: Lorient

Senior career*
Years	Team	Apps	(Gls)
2015–2020	Caen II	49	(0)
2020–2023	Lorient II	15	(0)
2022–2023	→ Annecy (loan)	2	(0)
2023–	Annecy	13	(0)
- * Club domestic league appearances and goals as of 11 May 2026

Thomas Callens (born 6 September 1998) is a French professional footballer who plays as a goalkeeper for Annecy.

== Career ==
Callens is a youth product of Lorient from the age of 8 until he was 17. He moved to Caen II in 2015 where he was part of their reserves for 5 years. He signed his first professional contract with Caen in 2018. He was due to make his professional debut in a Ligue 2 match on 13 March 2020 against Valenciennes, but the match was canceled because of the COVID-19 epidemic. On 5 October 2020, he transferred to Lorient on a 1+1 year deal. On 5 July 2021, he extended his contract with Lorient for 2 more years until 2023.

Callens joined Annecy on loan for the 2022–23 season as they were newly promoted to Ligue 2. He finally made his senior and professional debut with Annecy in a 8–1 Coupe de France win over Diables Noirs on 29 October 2022. On 18 January 2023, he permanently signed with Annecy on a deal until 2024.
