= Jérôme Hergault =

French footballer (born 1986)

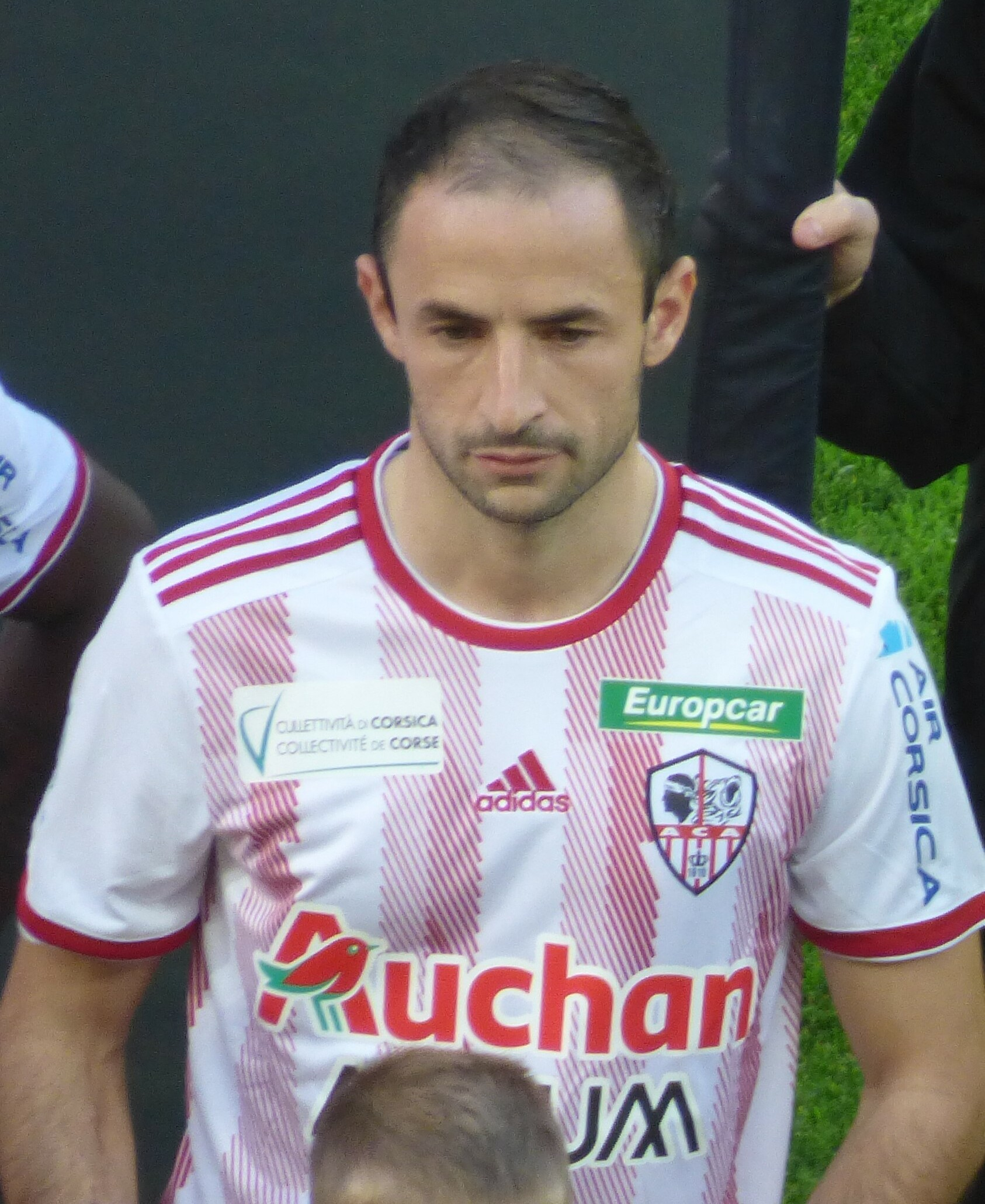
- Hergault in 2018

Personal information
- Date of birth: 5 April 1986 (age 40)
- Place of birth: Montmorency, France
- Height: 1.85 m (6 ft 1 in)
- Position: Defender

Youth career
- 2004–2008: Lavaur

Senior career*
Years	Team	Apps	(Gls)
2009–2014	Luzenac	131	(2)
2011–2012	→ Rouen (loan)	27	(0)
2014–2017	Red Star	79	(1)
2017–2019	Ajaccio	69	(0)
2019–2022	Lorient	46	(2)
- * Club domestic league appearances and goals as of 21 May 2022

Jérôme Hergault (born 5 April 1986) is a French professional footballer who plays as a defender.

He has previously played for Lavaur, Luzenac, Rouen and Red Star.

== Career ==
Hergault joined FC Lorient in summer 2019. He left Lorient on 26 August 2022, one of four players to do so that day, alongside Houboulang Mendes, Fabien Lemoine and Jérémy Morel.
