= Houboulang Mendes =

Bissau-Guinean footballer (born 1998)

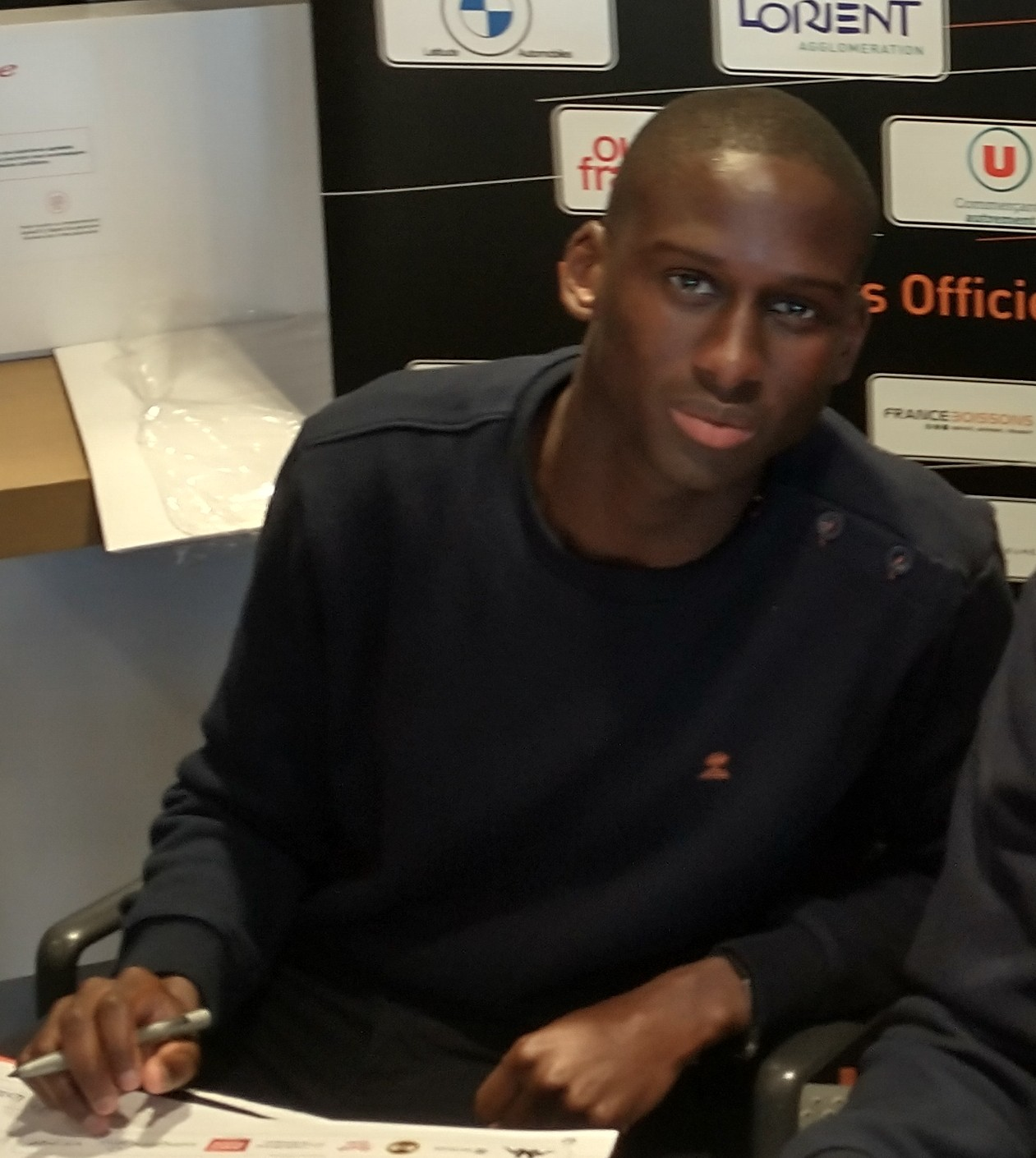

Personal information
- Date of birth: 4 May 1998 (age 28)
- Place of birth: Courcouronnes, France
- Height: 1.84 m (6 ft 0 in)
- Position: Right back

Team information
- Current team: Servette
- Number: 17

Youth career
- Viry-Châtillon
- Juvisy-sur-Orge AF
- 2013–2015: Laval

Senior career*
Years	Team	Apps	(Gls)
2015–2018	Laval II	15	(0)
2017–2018	Laval	28	(0)
2018–2022	Lorient	77	(0)
2019	Lorient II	2	(0)
2022–2025	Almería	21	(0)
2024	→ Mirandés (loan)	5	(0)
2024–2025	→ Troyes (loan)	29	(1)
2025–2026	Fortuna Sittard	6	(0)
2026–	Servette	25	(0)

International career^{‡}
2023–	Guinea-Bissau	4	(0)
- * Club domestic league appearances and goals as of 28 September 2026 ‡ National team caps and goals as of 22 January 2024

Houboulang Mendes (born 4 May 1998) is a professional footballer who plays for Swiss Super League club Servette. Mainly a right back, he can also play as a central defender. Born in France, he plays for the Guinea-Bissau national team.

== Club career ==
Mendes joined Laval' youth setup at the age of 15, after playing for Juvisy-sur-Orge AF and ES Viry-Châtillon. After playing for the reserve team, he made his first team debut on 19 May 2017, coming on as a late substitute for Malik Couturier in a 2–1 Ligue 2 home loss against Nîmes Olympique, as his side was already relegated.

A regular starter in the 2017–18 Championnat National, Mendes left Laval on 24 July 2018, and signed a four-year deal with FC Lorient in the second division. He was regularly used until February 2019, when he suffered a knee injury.

Mendes returned to action in October 2019, playing for the B-side before making three first team appearances as Lorient achieved promotion to Ligue 1. He made his debut in the category on 23 August 2020, starting in a 3–1 home win over RC Strasbourg Alsace.

On 6 July 2022, Mendes moved abroad for the first time in his career, signing a four-year contract with La Liga side UD Almería. Initially a backup to Alejandro Pozo, he was demoted to third-choice after the arrival of Marc Pubill, and was loaned to Segunda División side CD Mirandés on 1 February 2024.

On 27 August 2024, Mendes returned to France after agreeing to a one-year loan deal with ES Troyes AC. Upon returning, he terminated his contract with Almería on 8 August 2025.

On 8 August 2025, Mendes signed a three-year contract with Fortuna Sittard in the Netherlands.

On 21 January 2026, Mendes moved to Servette in Switzerland for two-and-a-half years.

== International career ==
Born in Courcouronnes, France, Mendes is of Senegalese and Bissau-Guinean descent. He was called up to the Guinea-Bissau national team for a set of 2023 Africa Cup of Nations qualification matches in September 2023.
