= 2019–20 Ligue 2 =

81st season of the second-tier football league in France

Ligue 2
- Season: 2019–20
- Dates: 26 July 2019 – 30 April 2020
- Champions: Lorient
- Promoted: Lorient; Lens
- Relegated: Orléans; Le Mans
- Matches played: 280
- Goals scored: 610 (2.18 per match)
- Top goalscorer: 20 goals Tino Kadewere, Le Havre
- Biggest home win: Sochaux 4–0 Clermont; Round 10, 5 October 2019; Lens 4–0 Sochaux; Round 15, 23 November 2019; Le Havre 4–0 Guingamp; Round 15, 25 November 2019
- Biggest away win: Chambly 1–5 Guingamp; Round 13, 1 November 2019; Troyes 0–4 Chambly; Round 15, 22 November 2019; Orléans 0–4 Lorient; Round 17, 3 December 2019; Châteauroux 1–5 Guingamp; Round 19, 20 December 2019; Sochaux 0–4 Lorient; Round 22, 1 February 2020
- Highest scoring: 8 goals Niort 4–4 Paris FC; Round 22, 31 January 2020
- Longest winning run: 5 (Lorient)
- Longest unbeaten run: 12 (Clermont)
- Longest winless run: 9 (Paris FC; Auxerre; Sochaux)
- Longest losing run: 5 (Le Mans; Rodez; Niort)
- Highest attendance: 32,011; Lens 1–0 Lorient; Round 13, 2 November 2019
- Lowest attendance: 391; Chambly 3–2 Niort; Round 18, 13 December 2019
- Average attendance: 6,768

The 2019–20 Ligue 2 (referred to as the Domino's Ligue 2 for sponsorship reasons) season was the 81st season since its establishment. The season was suspended indefinitely on 12 March 2020 due to the COVID-19 pandemic.

On 28 April 2020, the French Prime Minister Édouard Philippe announced that there would be no sporting events, even behind closed doors, before September 2020, thus in effect ending the season. On 30 April 2020, the LFP declared Lorient as champions of Ligue 2, and that the top two clubs would be promoted to Ligue 1, meaning Lens were promoted as well. The decision on relegations was deferred to the general assembly of the FFF on 20 May 2020.

On 27 May 2020, the executive committee of the FFF rejected a proposal by the LFP to have 22 clubs in the 2020–21 competition, which would have seen Orléans and Le Mans remain in the competition.

== Teams ==
=== Team changes ===
The following were team changes with respect to the 2018–19 Ligue 2 season.

Promoted from 2018–19 Championnat National

- Rodez
- Chambly
- Le Mans

Relegated from 2018–19 Ligue 1

- Caen
- Guingamp

Promoted to 2019–20 Ligue 1

- Metz
- Brest

Relegated to 2019–20 Championnat National

- Gazélec Ajaccio
- Béziers
- Red Star

=== Stadia and locations ===
Location of teams in 2019–20 Ligue 2

Club	Location	Venue	Capacity
Ajaccio	Ajaccio	Stade François Coty	10,446
Auxerre	Auxerre	Stade de l'Abbé-Deschamps	21,379
Caen	Caen	Stade Michel d'Ornano	21,215
Chambly	Chambly	Stade Pierre Brisson (Note: Chambly arranged to play 15 of their home matches at Stade Pierre Brisson and four at Stade Charléty as their home stadium, Stade des Marais, did not meet the required standards to host Ligue 2 football and would be undergoing renovation during the season.)	10,178
Châteauroux	Châteauroux	Stade Gaston Petit	17,173
Clermont Foot	Clermont-Ferrand	Stade Gabriel Montpied	11,980
Grenoble	Grenoble	Stade des Alpes	20,068
Guingamp	Guingamp	Stade de Roudourou	18,378
Le Havre	Le Havre	Stade Océane	25,178
Le Mans	Le Mans	MMArena	25,064
Lens	Lens	Stade Bollaert-Delelis	37,705
Lorient	Lorient	Stade du Moustoir	18,890
Nancy	Tomblaine	Stade Marcel Picot	20,087
Niort	Niort	Stade René Gaillard	10,886
Orléans	Orléans	Stade de la Source	7,000
Paris FC	Paris (13th arrondissement)	Stade Charléty	20,000
Rodez	Rodez	Stade Paul-Lignon	5,955
Sochaux	Montbéliard	Stade Auguste Bonal	20,005
Troyes	Troyes	Stade de l'Aube	21,684
Valenciennes	Valenciennes	Stade du Hainaut	25,172

=== Personnel and kits ===
Team	Manager	Captain	Kit manufacturer	Main sponsor
Ajaccio	(France) Olivier Pantaloni	(France) Johan Cavalli	Adidas	Auchan Atrium
Auxerre	(France) Jean-Marc Furlan	(Benin) Jordan Adéoti	Macron	Remorques LOUALT
Caen	(France) Pascal Dupraz	(Republic of the Congo) Prince Oniangué	Umbro	Maisons France Confort (H), Campagne de France (A & 3)
Châteauroux	(France) Nicolas Usaï	(Cameroon) Yannick M'Boné	Nike	Monin
Chambly	(France) Bruno Luzi	(France) Thibault Jaques	Umbro	Flint
Clermont	(France) Pascal Gastien	(Uruguay) Jonathan Iglesias	Patrick	Crédit Mutuel
Grenoble	(France) Philippe Hinschberger	(France) Brice Maubleu	Nike	Carrefour, Sempa, BONTAZ
Guingamp	(France) Sylvain Didot	(France) Christophe Kerbrat	Umbro	Servagroupe (H), Aroma Celte (A)
Le Havre	(France) Paul Le Guen	(France) Alexandre Bonnet	Joma	Filiassur, SEAFRIGO Group
Le Mans	(France) Réginald Ray	(France) Stéphen Vincent	Kappa	Veolia
Lens	(France) Franck Haise	(Algeria) Walid Mesloub	Macron	Auchan Retail
Lorient	(France) Christophe Pélissier	(France) Fabien Lemoine	Kappa	B&B Hotels, Jean Floc'h
Nancy	(France) Jean-Louis Garcia	(Guinea) Ernest Seka	Nike	Sempa
Niort	(France) Franck Passi	(France) Matthieu Sans	Erima	Restaurant Le Billon (H), Cheminées Poujoulat (A)
Orléans	(France) Cyril Carrière	(France) Gauthier Pinaud	Kappa	CTVL
Paris FC	(France) René Girard	(France) Vincent Demarconnay	Nike	Vinci
Rodez	(France) Laurent Peyrelade	(France) Pierre Bardy	Adidas	Max Outil
Sochaux	(Senegal) Omar Daf	(France) Maxence Prévot	Lotto	Nedey Automobiles
Troyes	(France) Laurent Batlles	(France) Stéphane Darbion	Le Coq Sportif	Babeau Seguin
Valenciennes	(France) Olivier Guégan	(France) Laurent Dos Santos	Acerbis	Mutuelle Just

=== Managerial changes ===
Team	Outgoing manager	Manner of departure	Date of vacancy	Position in table	Incoming manager	Date of appointment
Nancy	(France) Alain Perrin	End of interim	14 May 2019	Pre-season	(France) Jean-Louis Garcia	30 May 2019
Auxerre	(France) Cédric Daury	End of interim	17 May 2019	Pre-season	(France) Jean-Marc Furlan	17 May 2019
Lorient	(France) Mickaël Landreau	Mutual consent	18 May 2019	Pre-season	(France) Christophe Pélissier	29 May 2019
Guingamp	(France) Jocelyn Gourvennec	Mutual consent	24 May 2019	Pre-season	(France) Patrice Lair	29 May 2019
Caen	(France) Fabien Mercadal	Mutual consent	25 May 2019	Pre-season	(Portugal) Rui Almeida	9 June 2019
Le Havre	(France) Oswald Tanchot	Mutual consent	28 May 2019	Pre-season	(France) Paul Le Guen	29 May 2019
Valenciennes	(France) Réginald Ray	End of contract	6 June 2019	Pre-season	(France) Olivier Guégan	6 June 2019
Troyes	(Portugal) Rui Almeida	Signed by Caen	9 June 2019	Pre-season	(France) Laurent Batlles	14 June 2019
Guingamp	(France) Patrice Lair	Sacked	23 September 2019	14th	(France) Sylvain Didot	24 September 2019 (caretaker); 7 October 2019 (permanent)
Caen	(Portugal) Rui Almeida	Sacked	28 September 2019	17th	(France) Pascal Dupraz	1 October 2019
Paris FC	(Bosnia and Herzegovina) Mehmed Baždarević	Sacked	30 December 2019	19th	(France) René Girard	2 January 2020
Niort	(France) Pascal Plancque	Sacked	5 January 2020	18th	(France) Franck Passi	13 January 2020
Orléans	(France) Didier Ollé-Nicolle	Sacked	16 January 2020	20th	(France) Cyril Carrière	17 January 2020 (interim)
Le Mans	(France) Richard Déziré	Sacked	23 February 2020	19th	(France) Réginald Ray	2 March 2020
Lens	(France) Philippe Montanier	Sacked	25 February 2020	2nd	(France) Franck Haise	25 February 2020

== League table ==
Pos	Team	Pld	W	D	L	GF	GA	GD	Pts	Promotion or Relegation
1	Lorient (C, P)	28	17	3	8	45	25	+20	54	Promotion to Ligue 1
2	Lens (P)	28	15	8	5	39	24	+15	53	Promotion to Ligue 1
3	Ajaccio	28	15	7	6	38	22	+16	52	
4	Troyes	28	16	3	9	34	25	+9	51	
5	Clermont	28	14	8	6	35	25	+10	50	
6	Le Havre	28	11	11	6	38	25	+13	44	
7	Valenciennes	28	11	9	8	24	20	+4	42	
8	Guingamp	28	10	9	9	40	33	+7	39	
9	Grenoble	28	7	14	7	27	29	−2	35	
10	Chambly	28	9	8	11	26	32	−6	35	
11	Auxerre	28	8	10	10	31	30	+1	34	
12	Nancy	28	6	16	6	27	26	+1	34	
13	Caen	28	8	10	10	33	34	−1	34	
14	Sochaux	28	8	10	10	28	30	−2	34	
15	Châteauroux	28	9	7	12	22	38	−16	34	
16	Rodez	28	8	8	12	31	34	−3	32	
17	Paris FC	28	7	7	14	22	40	−18	28	
18	Niort (Note: Originally, the 18th-placed Ligue 2 team would play in promotion-relegation play-offs at the end of the season with a team from the Championnat National to decide whether they would remain in Ligue 2 for the 2020–21 season, but the play-offs were cancelled and the 18th- placed team remained in Ligue 2.)	28	6	8	14	30	41	−11	26	
19	Le Mans (R)	28	7	5	16	30	45	−15	26	Relegation to Championnat National
20	Orléans (R)	28	4	7	17	21	43	−22	19	Relegation to Championnat National

Source: Ligue 2
Rules for classification: 1) Points; 2) Goal difference; 3) Number of goals scored; 4) Head-to-head goal difference; 5) Fair play points
(C) Champions; (P) Promoted; (R) Relegated

== Results ==
Home \ Away	AJA	AUX	CAE	FCC	CHA	CLE	GRE	GUI	HAC	LMF	LEN	LOR	NAN	NIO	ORL	PFC	ROD	SOC	TRO	VAL
Ajaccio	—	2–3	1–2	—	0–1	1–1	3–1	—	2–2	2–0	1–2	1–0	0–0	—	0–0	1–0	1–0	—	—	2–0
Auxerre	3–1	—	1–1	0–0	—	0–0	0–1	2–2	2–0	2–0	—	—	0–0	3–1	2–2	—	—	2–1	1–2	1–1
Caen	0–1	—	—	0–0	1–1	0–0	2–0	—	0–3	3–3	0–2	1–2	1–0	4–3	2–1	—	—	—	0–1	0–0
Chambly	0–2	1–4	0–1	—	0–0	0–1	0–0	1–5	—	2–2	—	0–1	2–1	3–2	1–0	1–2	—	0–0	—	1–0
Châteauroux	0–1	1–0	2–1	0–3	—	—	1–1	1–5	0–3	—	3–2	1–3	—	1–1	—	0–1	0–0	1–1	0–1	—
Clermont	—	1–1	—	—	3–0	—	—	—	2–1	0–1	1–1	0–2	2–2	1–0	3–1	0–1	0–1	2–0	3–2	3–1
Grenoble	0–1	—	1–0	0–0	0–1	1–1	—	—	1–1	—	2–2	—	1–1	3–1	0–0	0–0	2–1	—	1–1	1–3
Guingamp	1–1	1–0	1–1	—	—	1–2	3–3	—	—	3–0	1–1	2–1	1–1	—	1–0	—	4–1	1–1	0–1	0–1
Le Havre	—	1–0	1–1	1–1	0–1	—	3–1	4–0	—	2–0	0–0	2–2	1–1	1–1	1–2	0–0	—	—	1–0	—
Le Mans	2–4	0–1	—	1–0	1–2	—	0–0	2–1	—	—	1–2	1–2	1–1	1–0	3–2	—	0–0	2–0	—	1–2
Lens	—	0–0	1–4	3–0	1–0	1–1	0–0	2–0	1–3	—	—	1–0	—	1–0	1–0	2–1	—	4–0	1–0	—
Lorient	0–0	1–0	2–1	1–2	—	0–1	2–1	0–1	—	4–2	—	—	2–1	4–1	—	3–0	2–1	1–0	0–1	—
Nancy	—	—	—	3–0	2–1	1–2	—	0–1	—	2–1	0–0	1–1	—	2–1	0–0	2–0	1–1	1–1	0–0	1–0
Niort	0–1	2–2	1–1	—	3–0	—	0–1	0–0	0–1	—	—	—	1–1	—	2–0	4–4	2–1	0–2	0–2	1–0
Orléans	0–3	—	—	0–1	1–1	0–1	—	2–0	2–2	—	1–4	0–4	—	0–1	—	0–1	1–2	1–0	0–2	0–1
Paris FC	2–3	2–0	2–4	0–3	—	0–2	—	0–3	1–0	0–3	0–2	—	—	0–1	—	—	0–0	1–1	1–0	—
Rodez	—	2–0	2–1	2–0	1–2	—	—	2–1	1–2	4–1	1–2	0–1	1–1	—	3–3	2–1	—	0–2	—	1–1
Sochaux	0–2	1–0	0–0	—	—	4–0	1–1	3–1	2–0	1–0	—	0–4	3–0	—	—	1–1	1–1	—	0–1	0–0
Troyes	2–1	3–1	2–1	0–4	2–0	1–2	1–2	—	1–2	2–1	2–0	—	—	—	1–2	1–1	1–0	—	—	1–0
Valenciennes	0–0	—	—	—	0–1	1–0	0–2	0–0	0–0	1–0	2–0	3–0	1–1	1–1	—	1–0	1–0	3–2	—	—

Source: Ligue 2
Legend: Blue = home team win; Yellow = draw; Red = away team win.
For upcoming matches, an "a" indicates there is an article about the rivalry between the two participants.

== Promotion play-offs ==
A promotion play-off competition was originally to be held at the end of the season, involving the third, fourth and fifth-placed teams in 2019–20 Ligue 2, and the 18th-placed team in 2019–20 Ligue 1. However, the matches were cancelled and the 18th-placed Ligue 1 team remained in the same division.

Cancelled bracket

Quarter-final
N/A
N/A

Semi-final
3	N/A
N/A

Final
N/A
18th	N/A

== Relegation play-offs ==
A relegation play-off was originally to be held at the end of the season between the 18th-placed Ligue 2 team and the third-placed team of the 2019–20 Championnat National. However, the matches were cancelled and both teams remained in their respective divisions.

== Top scorers ==
Rank	Player	Club	Goals
1	(Zimbabwe) Tino Kadewere	Le Havre	20
2	(Austria) Adrian Grbić	Clermont	17
3	(France) Yoane Wissa	Lorient	15
3	(France) Ibrahim Sissoko	Niort	15
5	(France) Teddy Chevalier	Valenciennes	12
6	(France) Ugo Bonnet	Rodez	11
7	(France) Gaëtan Courtet	Ajaccio	10
7	(Senegal) Abdoulaye Sané	Sochaux	10
9	(France) Pierre-Yves Hamel	Lorient	9
10	(Senegal) Jamal Thiaré	Le Havre	8
10	(France) Vincent Créhin	Le Mans	8
10	(France) Florian Sotoca	Lens	8
