= Pinaud =

Pinaud may refer to:

- Édouard Pinaud (1810 – 1868), French businessman and founder of the Ed. Pinaud perfume house and cosmetics company
- Gauthier Pinaud, (born 1988), French professional soccer player
