= 2022–23 Coupe de France preliminary rounds, Grand Est =

The 2022–23 Coupe de France preliminary rounds, Grand Est is the qualifying competition to decide which teams from the leagues of the Grand Est region of France take part in the main competition from the seventh round.

A total of nineteen teams will qualify from the Grand Est preliminary rounds.

In 2021–22, ES Thaon progressed furthest in the competition, reaching the round of 32, where they were narrowly beaten in stoppage time by Ligue 1 side Stade de Reims.

== Draws and fixtures ==
On 29 July 2022, the league published the first round draw, made up of 437 ties, and the list of 103 teams exempted to future rounds, thereby confirming that 977 teams from the region had entered.

The league published the second round draw on 23 August 2022, with 45 teams from Régional 2 entering at this stage. The third round draw was published on 6 September 2022, With 49 teams from Régional 1 and Championnat National 3 entering the competition, and 145 ties drawn.

The fourth round draw was published on 15 September 2022, with the three teams from Championnat National 2 entering at this stage.

The fifth round draw was published on 28 September 2022, and saw the two teams from Championnat National entering the competition. The sixth round draw was published on 11 October 2022.

=== First round ===
These matches were played on 19 and 20 August 2022.

First round results: Grand Est
Tie no	Home team (tier)	Score	Away team (tier)
1.	AS Sault-lès-Rethel (11)	0–6	Rethel SF (7)
2.	ES Novion-Porcien (11)	0–0 (4–3 p)	AS Monthermé-Thilay (10)
3.	AS Mouzon (10)	2–5	Liart-Signy-l'Abbaye FC (8)
4.	JS Vrignoise (11)	0–1	ES Saulces-Monclin (9)
5.	US Balan (9)	3–0 (Note: Tie won by means of forfeit.)	Nord Ardennes (9)
6.	FC Blagny-Carignan (8)	2–2 (4–3 p)	AS Bourg-Rocroi (9)
7.	US Machault (11)	0–5	Le Theux FC (7)
8.	FC Launois (11)	0–5	AS Val de l'Aisne (8)
9.	AS Tournes/Renwez/Les Mazures/Arreux/Montcornet (8)	5–0	ES Charleville-Mézières (8)
10.	Joyeuse de Warcq (11)	0–4	AS Boulzicourt (9)
11.	US Fumay-Charnois (9)	2–7	AS Asfeld (7)
12.	US Bazeilles (8)	3–1	FC Haybes (9)
13.	AS Monthois (11)	2–6	EM Charleville-Mézières (9)
14.	FC Maubert-Fontaine (11)	1–1 (5–4 p)	USC Nouvion-sur-Meuse (8)
15.	AS Pouru-aux-Bois (11)	1–6	US Revin (8)
16.	AS Franco-Turque Charleville-Mézières (10)	2–1	FC Vallée de la Suippe (10)
17.	SOS Buzancy (11)	3–0	ES Auvillers/Signy-le-Petit (10)
18.	AS Noyers-Pont-Maugis (11)	0–4	QV Douzy (8)
19.	ASR Raucourt (11)	0–2	USA Le Chesne (7)
20.	FC Porcien (8)	2–4	Olympique Torcy-Sedan (8)
21.	Cheveuges-Saint-Aignan CO (10)	5–0	Floing FC (9)
22.	US Les Ayvelles (9)	2–2 (4–1 p)	FC Allobais Doncherois (10)
23.	SC Portugais Épernay (12)	0–5	FC Tinqueux Champagne (8)
24.	ES Gaye (12)	3–0	Foyer Compertrix (9)
25.	AS Marolles (12)	2–2 (4–3 p)	US Thiéblemont-Farémont (10)
26.	US Fismes Ardre et Vesle (8)	4–0	Nord Champagne FC (8)
27.	Vitry FC (8)	3–1	CS Agéen (8)
28.	FC Faux-Vésigneul-Pogny (10)	0–3	AS Mourmelon Livry Bouy (11)
29.	ASJ Auménancourt (12)	0–7	ASPTT Châlons (7)
30.	FC Haute Borne (10)	1–3	USS Sermaize (9)
31.	AS Luxémont-et-Villotte (12)	0–3	AF Épernay Triomphe (8)
32.	ES Gault-Soigny (10)	5–0	FC Sillery (10)
33.	US Esternay (9)	5–1	SC Dormans (10)
34.	FC Saint-Martin-sur-le-Pré/La Veuve/Recy (10)	0–4	FCF La Neuvillette-Jamin (8)
35.	Entente Somsois Margerie Saint-Utin (10)	2–1	AS Taissy (8)
36.	FC Bezannes 2050 (11)	3–1	Reims Athletic FC (11)
37.	FC Caillot (10)	1–1 (3–4 p)	FC Christo (8)
38.	AS Gueux (10)	2–1	ES Côteaux Sud (10)
39.	Olympique FC (11)	3–0	US Couvrot (10)
40.	FC Bignicourier (11)	0–13	Reims Murigny Franco Portugais (9)
41.	ES Muizonnaise (11)	0–3	US Châtelraould-Les Rivières-Henruel (10)
42.	Entente Rémoise (10)	0–9	Espérance Rémoise (8)
43.	AS Cheminon (10)	2–2 (13–12 p)	US Oiry (8)
44.	US Dizy (10)	0–3	FC Côte des Blancs (7)
45.	SL Pontfaverger (10)	0–2	Bétheny FC (8)
46.	AS Maurupt-le-Montois (10)	1–5	ES Witry-les-Reims (9)
47.	Argonne FC (10)	4–0	FC Europort (10)
48.	FC Prunay (11)	7–1	Saint-Memmie FC (10)
49.	AS Saint-Brice-Courcelles (9)	1–0	AS Courtisols ESTAN (9)
50.	Entente Étoges-Vert (11)	0–2	SC Sézannais (7)
51.	Étoile Lusigny (9)	0–3	AS Droupt-Saint-Basle (10)
52.	FC Morgendois (9)	1–1 (3–5 p)	AS Portugaise Nogent-sur-Seine (9)
53.	Alliance Sud-Ouest Football Aubois (8)	3–2	ES Nord Aubois (8)
54.	Aube Sud Loisirs Omnisports (10)	0–14	Foyer Barsequanais (8)
55.	ESC Pays d'Orient (10)	1–7	JS Saint-Julien FC (7)
56.	FC Chesterfield (10)	1–6	Creney FC (10)
57.	Romilly Champagne FC (10)	2–2 (3–2 p)	FC Nord Est Aubois (8)
58.	SC Savières (10)	0–9	FC Malgache (7)
59.	Bar-sur-Aube FC (8)	4–1	Torvilliers AC (9)
60.	US Vendeuvre (9)	0–3	AS Chartreux (9)
61.	FC Vallant/Les Grès (8)	3–2	FC Trainel (9)
62.	ESC Melda (8)	2–1	ES Municipaux Troyes (8)
63.	Étoile Chapelaine (9)	3–0	FC Conflans-sur-Seine (10)
64.	ES Celles-Essoyes (9)	1–2	Amicale Saint-Germain (10)
65.	AS Pont-Saint-Marie (11)	3–0	AS Tertre (9)
66.	US Wassy Brousseval (10)	0–11	US Éclaron (7)
67.	ASPTT Chaumont (9)	4–1	FC Joinville-Vecqueville (8)
68.	FC Saint-Urbain (11)	0–0 (4–3 p)	CS Doulaincourt-Saucourt (11)
69.	AS Lasarjonc (10)	3–0	Foyer Bayard (10)
70.	ES Breuvannes (11)	1–3	CA Rolampontais (9)
71.	AS Froncles (11)	2–5	FC Prez Bourmont (8)
72.	US Arc-en-Barrois (10)	6–0	FC Châteauvillain (10)
73.	ES des 3 Châteaux (10)	1–2	ES Andelot-Rimaucourt-Bourdons (8)
74.	US Montier-en-Der (8)	2–0	CO Langres (9)
75.	CS Maranville-Rennepont (8)	2–2 (3–4 p)	CS Chalindrey (8)
76.	AF Valcourt (10)	4–0	Colombey FC (10)
77.	AJ Humes Jorquenay (11)	2–5	SR Neuilly-l'Évêque (9)
78.	SL Ornel (9)	1–4	AS Sarrey-Montigny (7)
79.	US Rouvres (11)	3–0	JS Louvemontaise (10)
80.	US Bourbonnaise (10)	2–0	ASL Mediolanaise (11)
81.	AS Chamouilley Roches-sur-Marne (10)	3–3 (4–2 p)	AS Luzy-Verbiesles-Foulain (11)
82.	AS Poissons-Noncourt (9)	1–1 (3–0 p)	FC Bologne (10)
83.	DS Eurville-Bienville (10)	0–1	ES Prauthoy-Vaux (8)
84.	FC Hallignicourt (12)	2–6	US Biesles (9)
85.	FCCS Bragard (10)	1–1 (4–3 p)	FC Villiers-en-Lieu (10)
86.	FC Dampierre (10)	0–7	FC Saints-Geosmois (7)
87.	SF Verdun Belleville (8)	1–0	FC Revigny (9)
88.	ASC Montiers-sur-Saulx (10)	3–3 (3–4 p)	ES Tilly-Ambly Villers-Bouquemont (10)
89.	Gars de l'Ornois Gondrecourt-Le-Château (11)	2–2 (6–7 p)	FC Fains-Véel (9)
90.	FC Pagny-sur-Meuse (10)	0–6	US Behonne-Longeville-en-Barois (8)
91.	AS Tréveray (9)	4–0 (Note: Tie reversed from original draw.)	ASCC Seuil d'Argonne (10)
92.	FC Dugny (9)	2–3	Lorraine Vaucouleurs (9)
93.	RC Saulx et Barrois (10)	2–3	SC Les Islettes (10)
94.	AS Stenay Mouzay (10)	0–0 (2–4 p)	ES Maizey-Lacroix (9)
95.	AS Val d'Ornain (10)	3–7	Association Saint-Laurent-Mangiennes (9)
96.	US Thierville (8)	3–1	ASC Charny-sur-Meuse (10)
97.	SC Commercy (10)	1–6	Entente Centre Ornain (8)
98.	FC Saint-Mihiel (9)	6–1	AS Dieue-Sommedieue (9)
99.	ES Lérouvillois Cheminote (10)	2–1	Entente Vigneulles-Hannonville-Fresne (8)
100.	ES Michelloise (11)	0–2	ASC Dompaire (10)
101.	AS Gironcourt (10)	4–1	FC Charmois-l'Orgueilleux (11)
102.	AS Plombières (10)	1–1 (5–4 p)	AS Gérardmer (8)
103.	JS Châtenois (11)	0–1	FC Hadol-Dounoux (8)
104.	SR Pouxeux Jarménil (11)	0–4	FC Des Ballons (9)
105.	AS Nomexy-Vincey (10)	1–4	RF Bulgnéville (10)
106.	FC Saint-Amé Julienrupt (11)	2–3	RC Corcieux (11)
107.	US Arches-Archettes-Raon (10)	7–1	IFC Lerrain-Esley (11)
108.	CS Thillotin (12)	0–4	AS Saint-Nabord (9)
109.	ASL Coussey-Greux (10)	3–0	FC Le Tholy (11)
110.	SM Taintrux (10)	0–5	Bulgnéville Contrex Vittel FC (8)
111.	AS Ramonchamp (10)	1–0	FC Sainte-Marguerite (8)
112.	SM Etival (10)	2–2 (7–8 p)	US Senones (12)
113.	Saulcy FC (9)	1–3	CS Charmes (9)
114.	La Saint-Maurice Poussay (11)	1–3	US Mirecourt-Hymont (10)
115.	FC Granges-sur-Vologne (10)	0–3	SM Bruyères (9)
116.	ASF Saulxures-sur-Moselotte-Thiéfosse (11)	0–6	AS Girancourt-Dommartin-Chaumousey (8)
117.	AS Vagney (8)	2–2 (4–2 p)	FC Remiremont Saint-Étienne (8)
118.	FC Val d'Ajol (11)	1–0	AS Aydoilles (11)
119.	FC Vierge (10)	6–0	ES Haute Meurthe (10)
120.	US Lamarche (11)	0–5	ES Avière Darnieulles (8)
121.	FC Darney Val de Saône (11)	1–5	FC Dommartin-lès-Remiremont (11)
122.	FC Neufchâteau-Liffol (10)	6–0	AS Padoux (9)
123.	Entente Bru-Jeanménil SBH (9)	1–2	FC Martigny-les-Bains (10)
124.	AS La Chapelle-aux-Bois (12)	0–7	Dogneville FC (10)
125.	AS Vallée de la Moselle (12)	1–5	FC Amerey Xertigny (9)
126.	FC Haute Moselotte (9)	10–0	AS Cheniménil (10)
127.	FC Pont-à-Mousson (8)	0–2	FC Saint-Max-Essey (8)
128.	Maxéville FC (10)	1–2	AJS René II (10)
129.	ASPTT Nancy (12)	0–3	Omnisports Frouard Pompey (9)
130.	FC Dombasle-sur-Meurthe (8)	1–1 (3–4 p)	ENJ Val-de-Seille (8)
131.	FC Toul (9)	3–0	FR Faulx (10)
132.	AS Dommartin-lès-Toul (10)	3–0	FC Atton (11)
133.	ES Laneuveville (9)	4–0	AS Varangéville-Saint-Nicolas (10)
134.	AS Lay-Saint-Christophe/Bouxieres-aux-Dames (7)	7–0	AS Haut-du-Lièvre Nancy (8)
135.	Football Lunéville Turc (10)	0–3	US Rosières-aux-Salines (10)
136.	Toul JCA (8)	3–4	FC Écrouves (9)
137.	ASC Saulxures-lès-Nancy (9)	3–2	AS Colombey (10)
138.	AS Chavigny (11)	0–0 (6–5 p)	AS Bouxières-aux-Dames (11)
139.	GAS Croismare (11)	1–7	AS Grand Couronné (9)
140.	GS Vézelise (11)	6–1	Amicale de Chanteheux (11)
141.	AJSE Montauville (10)	3–4	AS Gondreville (8)
142.	ES Lunéville Sixte (9)	0–3	Olympique Haussonville (10)
143.	GSA Tomblaine (10)	3–3 (1–4 p)	CS&O Blénod-Pont-à-Mousson (7)
144.	AS Art-sur-Meurthe/Bosserville/Lenoncourt (11)	0–8	ES Custines-Malleloy (9)
145.	MJC Pichon (9)	4–1	FC Montois (10)
146.	GS Haroué-Benney (8)	2–1	ES Bayon-Roville (9)
147.	AS Ludres (8)	6–3	Stade Flévillois (9)
148.	FC Loisy (11)	0–3	Espérance Gerbéviller (10)
149.	Entente Sud 54 (11)	0–2	FC Seichamps (9)
150.	FC Sommerviller (11)	0–2	FC Houdemont (9)
151.	AS Villey-Saint Étienne (9)	2–2 (5–6 p)	FC Dieulouard (9)
152.	FC Pont-Saint-Vincent (11)	1–1 (1–3 p)	AS Velaine-en-Haye (11)
153.	FC Château-Salins (9)	1–0 (Note: Match abandoned after an hour. FR Ommeray penalised, FC Château-Salins qualify.)	FR Ommeray (11)
154.	EFT Sarrebourg (10)	0–3	Sportive Lorquinoise (10)
155.	AS Réchicourt-le-Château (11)	0–3	AS Bettborn Hellering (9)
156.	ES Badonviller-Celles (11)	0–3	AS Brouviller (10)
157.	FR Thiaville (11)	10–2	SC Vic-sur-Seille (11)
158.	Olympique Mittelbronn 04 (10)	3–3 (3–4 p)	FC Troisfontaines (10)
159.	FC Cirey-sur-Vezouze (12)	0–9	AS Laneuveville Marainviller (9)
160.	SS Hilbesheim (10)	1–7	USF Brouderdorff (8)
161.	US Schneckenbusch (9)	0–2	AS Réding (8)
162.	SR Gosselming (10)	2–5	FC Dieuze (9)
163.	FC Abreschviller (10)	1–1 (4–3 p)	ES Avricourt Moussey (10)
164.	SC Baccarat (10)	2–1	SR Langatte (11)
165.	EF Delme-Solgne (9)	3–1	Montagnarde Walscheid (8)
166.	FC Héming (11)	0–6	AS MJC Blâmont (10)
167.	FC Saint-Quirin (12)	0–6	US Saint-Louis Lutzelbourg (10)
168.	SC Terville (10)	9–1	JS Bousse (10)
169.	RS Serémange-Erzange (10)	1–7	FC Hayange (9)
170.	ES Longuyon (9)	8–0	ES Gorcy-Cosnes (10)
171.	AS Algrange (8)	2–1	AG Metzervisse (8)
172.	AS Tucquegnieux-Trieux (10)	1–4	RC Nilvange (10)
173.	JS Thil (10)	0–0 (3–2 p)	US Yutz (8)
174.	US Marspich (10)	1–2	AS Volstroff (10)
175.	US Volkrange (10)	1–6	Olympic Saint Charles Haucourt (11)
176.	AS Entrange (11)	0–4	JS Distroff (11)
177.	FC Angevillers (12)	– (Note: FC Angevillers penalised, Entente Réhon Villers Morfontaine qualify. Original scoreline unknown.)	Entente Réhon Villers Morfontaine (10)
178.	RS Ottange-Nondkeil (10)	1–1 (3–2 p)	CS Volmerange-les-Mines (10)
179.	JSA Yutz Cité (11)	7–0	JS Rettel Hunting Contz
180.	US Guentrange (10)	0–3	TS Bertrange (9)
181.	FC Veckring (11)	0–3	JL Knutange (11)
182.	US Lexy (9)	0–1	CSP Réhon (9)
183.	US Florange-Ebange (11)	0–3	US Illange (9)
184.	US Aumetz (11)	0–8	JS Audunoise (9)
185.	US Oudrenne (10)	3–0	AS Œutrange (11)
186.	RC Pierrepont (11)	1–6	AS Mercy-le-Bas (10)
187.	JS Manom (11)	3–0	FC Guénange (9)
188.	ES Crusnes (8)	1–2	ES Kœnigsmacker-Kédange (8)
189.	AS Saulnes Longlaville (8)	1–3	CS Veymerange (7)
190.	US Russange (11)	1–3	USB Longwy (9)
191.	ASC Basse-Ham (9)	3–2	AS Sœtrich (10)
192.	USL Mont Saint-Martin (9)	0–3	USAG Uckange (7)
193.	CS Godbrange (8)	0–1	FC Hettange-Grande (7)
194.	FC Pays Audunois (11)	1–3	Entente Bure-Boulange (9)
195.	US Cattenom (10)	1–3	FC Yutz (7)
196.	ES Vallée de l'Othain (11)	2–2 (4–5 p)	US Beuveille (11)
197.	US Fontoy (9)	7–0	AS Konacker (10)
198.	FC Verny-Louvigny-Cuvry (8)	2–0	US Conflans Doncourt (9)
199.	ES Béchy (10)	0–2	AS Ay-sur-Moselle (11)
200.	AS Metz Grange-aux-Bois (11)	1–9	ES Marange-Silvange (8)
201.	US Ban-Saint-Martin (9)	3–2	AS Hauconcourt (10)
202.	Academie Jules Bocandé (11)	0–2	FC Devant-les-Ponts Metz (8)
203.	JS Metz (12)	2–3	FC Woippy (10)
204.	US ACLI Metz (9)	10–0	JS Ars-Laquenexy (9)
205.	FC Trémery (7)	3–1	US Etain-Buzy (7)
206.	SC Moulins-lès-Metz (10)	1–3	US Châtel Conquistadors (8)
207.	AS Mars-la-Tour (11)	0–2	AS Sainte-Barbe Sanry Méchy (11)
208.	RS Amanvillers (7)	0–0 (5–4 p)	US Jarny (8)
209.	FC Mondelange (10)	0–3	ES Metz (8)
210.	US Froidcul (10)	0–2	Ars-sur-Moselle FC (10)
211.	AS Corny (11)	0–0 (3–1 p)	GS Thiaucourt (9)
212.	FC Pierrevillers (10)	2–7	ES Courcelles-sur-Nied (9)
213.	Entente Gravelotte-Verneville (11)	2–1	Fleury FC (10)
214.	JSO Ennery (11)	1–5	AS Talange (9)
215.	SC Marly (8)	3–5	FC Novéant (9)
216.	Athletic Cuvry Augny (9)	6–1	ES Richemont (10)
217.	AS Les Côteaux (8)	1–4	AS Clouange (8)
218.	AS Magny (11)	0–5	US Briey (8)
219.	CS Montois (11)	0–5	ES Rosselange Vitry (7)
220.	AS du Plateau Sainte-Marie-aux-Chênes (11)	4–2	US Batilly (9)
221.	US Vigy (11)	0–3	AS Montigny-lès-Metz (7)
222.	ES Maizières (11)	0–4	RS La Maxe (9)
223.	ES Fameck (7)	2–1	UL Rombas (8)
224.	JA Rémilly (11)	0–10	ES Woippy (9)
225.	AS Metz Patrotte (11)	3–0	Olympique Valleroy Moineville Hatrize (10)
226.	JS Wenheck (9)	4–0 (Note: JS Wenheck penalised, FC Carling qualify.)	FC Carling (10)
227.	AS Guerting (11)	2–0	FC Verrerie-Sophie (11)
228.	FC Altrippe (12)	2–12	ES Macheren Petit-Ebersviller (9)
229.	SC L'Hôpital (12)	3–6	AS Hellimer (9)
230.	FC Bruch (12)	3–2	FC Creutzberg Forbach (10)
231.	US Filstroff (12)	0–2	FC Coume (9)
232.	Flétrange SA (12)	1–1 (4–3 p)	ES Petite-Rosselle (8)
233.	AS Freybouse-Frémestroff (12)	3–0	ES Cocheren (11)
234.	FC Francaltroff (11)	1–3	AS Grostenquin Bérig Bistroff (10)
235.	US Waldweistroff (11)	0–3	FC Freyming (8)
236.	ASJA Saint-Avold (11)	1–5	CO Bouzonville (10)
237.	FC Hochwald (9)	2–2 (3–4 p)	FC Longeville-lès-Saint-Avold (8)
238.	US Morsbach (11)	0–2	ES Lixing-Laning 95 (10)
239.	AS Teting-sur-Nied (10)	0–3	SR Creutzwald 03 (8)
240.	US Courcelles-Chaussy (12)	0–3	AS Falck (10)
241.	FC Vœlfling (11)	0–1	SO Merlebach (8)
242.	JS Rémering (11)	1–0	AS Anzeling Edling (11)
243.	ES Faulquemont-Créhange (10)	2–5	FC Folschviller (9)
244.	US Bambiderstroff (11)	0–2	US Valmont (8)
245.	ESR Rémeling (10)	1–4	Étoile Naborienne Saint-Avold (7)
246.	US Rouhling (10)	12–1	SR Baerenthal (11)
247.	ES Ormersviller-Epping (11)	0–2	FC Metzing (9)
248.	AS Kalhausen (10)	3–0	US Hundling (11)
249.	Saint-Louis 2017 (11)	0–7	Achen-Etting-Schmittviller (7)
250.	US Alsting-Zinzing (10)	5–2	Entente Neufgrange-Siltzheim (11)
251.	Entente Schorbach Hottviller Volmunster 13 (11)	7–1	SF Enchenberg (11)
252.	AS Rech (11)	1–3	US Saint-Jean-Rohrbach (11)
253.	ES Schœneck (10)	0–3	SO Ippling (10)
254.	FC Hambach (9)	0–5	US Farébersviller 05 (9)
255.	US Woustviller (11)	0–0 (9–8 p)	FC Farschviller (10)
256.	ES Rimling-Erching-Obergailbach (10)	2–0	AS Le Val-de-Guéblange (9)
257.	US Etzling (11)	0–4	ES Wies-Woelf 93 (10)
258.	AS Kerbach (10)	0–1	ES Pays du Bitche 2020 (10)
259.	FC Waldhouse-Walschbronn (10)	1–4	AS Bliesbruck (8)
260.	FC Sarralbe (9)	4–1	ES Gros Réderching-Bettviller (10)
261.	FC Lemberg-Saint-Louis (10)	2–6 (Note: US Soucht penalised, FC Lemberg-Saint-Louis qualify.)	US Soucht (8)
262.	CS Diebling (10)	4–1	US Hilsprich (11)
263.	US Roth (11)	1–1 (3–1 p)	Grains de Sable Nébing (9)
264.	Entente Petit-Réderching Siersthal (12)	3–0	FC Istanbul Sarreguemines (10)
265.	FC Rahling (10)	1–4	AS Lixing-lès-Rouhling (11)
266.	CS Wittring (11)	4–2	CS Stiring-Wendel (9)
267.	FC Bitche (10)	1–3	AS Neunkirch (8)
268.	AS Mouterhouse (10)	1–5	US Nousseviller (7)
269.	US Holving (9)	0–10	AS Montbronn (9)
270.	FC Village Neuf (10)	1–3	Entente Grentzingen-Bettendorf (11)
271.	AS Luemschwiller (13)	0–3	Montreux Sports (9)
272.	Entente Oltingue Raedersdorf (11)	5–6	Alliance Folgensbourg Muespach (10)
273.	FC Traubach (10)	1–1 (12–11 p)	FC Hirtzbach (9)
274.	FC Kappelen (10)	7–1	AS Durlinsdorf (11)
275.	ASCCO Helfrantzkirch (11)	1–2	FC Hagenthal-Wentzwiller (8)
276.	AS Hausgauen (12)	4–0	AS Mertzen (9)
277.	US Hésingue (9)	1–2	US Hirsingue (8)
278.	FC Uffheim (9)	0–2	FC Bartenheim (7)
279.	FC Seppois-Bisel (10)	0–1	RC Dannemarie (8)
280.	FC Rosenau (10)	3–3 (3–1 p)	AS Altkirch (8)
281.	FC Obermorschwiller/Tagsdorf (10)	2–3	AS Riespach (11)
282.	FC Steinbrunn-le-Bas (10)	4–0	FC Illfurth (10)
283.	SS Zillisheim (8)	0–1	US Wittenheim (7)
284.	US Azzurri Mulhouse (9)	1–2	Entente Hagenbach-Balschwiller (10)
285.	AS Hochstatt (11)	3–1	AS Schlierbach (12)
286.	AS Rixheim (10)	5–4	Étoile Mulhouse (11)
287.	FC Bantzenheim (13)	0–3	FC Anatolie Mulhouse (10)
288.	FC Battenheim (13)	0–3	FC Sausheim (9)
289.	FC Pays Rhénan (8)	5–0	FC Habsheim (9)
290.	US Zimmersheim-Eschentzwiller (11)	0–5	FC Riedisheim (8)
291.	RC Mulhouse (10)	6–0 (Note: Match abandoned with five minutes remaining, due to fighting on the pitch. Both teams removed from the competition.)	SC Ottmarsheim (8)
292.	AS Theodore Ruelisheim Wittenheim (8)	0–2	FC Baldersheim (9)
293.	Real ASPTT Mulhouse CF (8)	6–0	FC Kingersheim (9)
294.	AS Blanc Vieux-Thann (12)	0–3	FCRS Richwiller (8)
295.	AS Heimsbrunn (9)	3–1	FC Feldkirch (10)
296.	AS Aspach-le-Haut (10)	1–2	FC Morschwiller-le-Bas (8)
297.	FC Masevaux (10)	4–2	AS Guewenheim (10)
298.	AS Coteaux Mulhouse (11)	8–0	FC Blue Star Reiningue (10)
299.	SR Saint-Amarin (9)	2–2 (4–5 p)	US Pulversheim FC (9)
300.	AS de la Doller (10)	0–4	FC Roderen (11)
301.	Cernay FC (8)	1–1 (7–6 p) (Note: Cernay FC penalised, Stade Burnhauptois qualify.)	Stade Burnhauptois (7)
302.	Thann FC 2017 (11)	0–8	AS Lutterbach (9)
303.	ASCA Wittelsheim (10)	1–0	AS Berrwiller-Hartsmannswiller (8)
304.	FC Brunstatt (8)	2–2 (3–4 p)	US Vallée de la Thur (8)
305.	CS Mulhouse Bourtzwiller (9)	10–2	US Oberbruck Dolleren (10)
306.	AS Pfaffenheim (9)	3–0	FC Merxheim (9)
307.	FC Fessenheim (8)	4–2	FC Hirtzfelden (8)
308.	FC Sainte-Croix-en-Plaine (8)	0–0 (5–6 p)	AS Andolsheim (11)
309.	FC Ungersheim (11)	0–2	FC Oberhergheim (11)
310.	FC Munchhouse (10)	1–1 (5–6 p)	AS Raedersheim (8)
311.	FC Soultz 1919 (12)	0–5	FC Wintzfelden-Osenbach (7)
312.	FC Ensisheim (11)	1–1 (4–5 p)	AGIIR Florival (8)
313.	FC Wettolsheim (11)	1–3	FC Meyenheim (9)
314.	FC Gundolsheim (10)	2–0	AS Vallée Noble (12)
315.	AS Herrlisheim (12)	2–5	FC Niederhergheim (8)
316.	FC Réguisheim (9)	2–4	FC Rouffach (8)
317.	FC Buhl (10)	3–2	FC Heiteren (10)
318.	FC Horbourg-Wihr (10)	0–3	FR Jebsheim-Muntzenheim (10)
319.	AS Munster (8)	1–1 (4–2 p)	SR Kaysersberg (8)
320.	AS Sigolsheim (12)	0–3	FC Ostheim-Houssen (8)
321.	FC Bischwihr (14)	0–7	AS Canton Vert (10)
322.	FC Ingersheim (9)	1–2	FC Bennwihr (9)
323.	US Gunsbach (12)	3–3 (3–4 p)	FC Grussenheim (10)
324.	US Artzenheim (13)	1–7	AS Turckheim (10)
325.	Racing HW 96 (8)	5–0	US Colmar (9)
326.	FC Vogelgrun Obersaasheim (13)	6–2	SR Widensolen (10)
327.	FC Colmar Unifié (12)	3–0	FC Portugais Colmar (12)
328.	AS Elsenheim (11)	2–1	AS Guémar (8)
329.	AS Marckolsheim (10)	3–0	FCI Riquewihr (13)
330.	FC Hessenheim (13)	1–3	FC Artolsheim (9)
331.	FC Hilsenheim (12)	2–3 (Note: AS Portugais Sélestat penalised, FC Hilsenheim qualify.)	AS Portugais Sélestat (10)
332.	SC Maisonsgoutte (13)	9–3	AS Muttersholtz (13)
333.	CS Sainte-Croix-aux-Mines (13)	1–1 (7–8 p)	RC Kintzheim (9)
334.	ASC Saint-Pierre-Bois/Triembach-au-Val (10)	0–5	SC Sélestat (8)
335.	AS Mussig (10)	0–1	US Baldenheim (9)
336.	FC Boersch (11)	1–0	AS Schœnau (11)
337.	FC Ebersmunster (14)	2–1	FC Bindernheim (9)
338.	US Sundhouse (12)	2–5	SC Ebersheim (10)
339.	AS Châtenois (11)	– (Note: AS Châtenois penalised, AS Saint-Hippolyte qualify.)	AS Saint-Hippolyte (12)
340.	SR Bergheim (11)	0–2	US Scherwiller (8)
341.	FC Egalité Strasbourg (13)	2–4	FC Krautergersheim (10)
342.	FC Lingolsheim (10)	0–5	ALFC Duttlenheim (8)
343.	FC Stockfeld Colombes (12)	1–2	AS Holtzheim (10)
344.	ASPTT Strasbourg (13)	0–3	FC Eckbolsheim (8)
345.	ES Wolfisheim (13)	4–3	FC Breuschwickersheim (10)
346.	Erno FC (12)	3–0	ASC Blaesheim (13)
347.	USL Duppigheim (9)	1–2	AS Musau Strasbourg (9)
348.	US Hangenbieten (11)	2–1	EB Achenheim (9)
349.	FC Ostwald (10)	0–6	FC Entzheim (11)
350.	Strasbourg United (13)	2–5	US Innenheim (11)
351.	FC Souffelweyersheim (9)	1–1 (4–3 p)	AP Joie et Santé Strasbourg (9)
352.	AS 2000 Strasbourg (12)	3–0	AS Espagnols Schiltigheim (12)
353.	SC Red Star Strasbourg (10)	1–6	AS Neudorf (8)
354.	AJF Hautepierre (9)	1–1 (11–12 p)	AS Strasbourg (9)
355.	SOAS Robertsau Strasbourg (13)	1–2	CS Neuhof Strasbourg (9)
356.	La Wantzenau FC (11)	4–4 (3–4 p)	ASE Cité de l'Ill Strasbourg (9)
357.	FC Oberhausbergen (10)	1–2	FC Lampertheim (9)
358.	AS Reichstett (11)	0–5	FC Ecrivains-Schiltigheim-Bischheim (10)
359.	Internationale Meinau Académie (9)	2–1	ASL Robertsau (8)
360.	FC Niederhausbergen (12)	0–6	SR Hoenheim (9)
361.	US Eckwersheim (10)	0–3	AS Mundolsheim (8)
362.	FC Soufflenheim (11)	0–7	AS Gambsheim (8)
363.	FC Bischwiller (12)	2–2 (2–4 p)	FC Rohrwiller (13)
364.	AS Kilstett (12)	3–2	US Turcs Bischwiller (8)
365.	FC Herrlisheim (9)	1–2	FC Drusenheim (7)
366.	US Dalhunden (13)	3–0	SC Roppenheim (12)
367.	FC Gries (12)	0–5	FCE Schirrhein (7)
368.	SR Rountzenheim-Auenheim (9)	1–5	SC Rœschwoog (10)
369.	SS Beinheim (10)	0–4	Entente Kaltenhouse/Marienthal (8)
370.	ES Offendorf (13)	0–3	FC Weitbruch (10)
371.	AS Forstfeld (12)	3–0	FC Oberhoffen (11)
372.	AS Saint-Barthelemy Leutenheim (12)	0–6	FR Sessenheim-Stattmatten (9)
373.	Fatih-Sport Haguenau (11)	3–0	FC Geudertheim (10)
374.	ASLC Berstett (12)	1–1 (3–2 p)	SC Dettwiller (11)
375.	Entente de la Mossig Wasselonne/Romanswiller (11)	1–1 (6–7 p)	AS Hohengœft (10)
376.	FC Marlenheim-Kirchheim (11)	1–2	ES Pfettisheim (8)
377.	FC Schaffhouse-sur-Zorn (11)	3–2	FC Monswiller (12)
378.	AS Lupstein (10)	0–3	FC Saverne (8)
379.	FC Schnersheim (12)	2–1	FC Quatzenheim (12)
380.	ASC Brotsch (12)	3–3 (3–4 p)	FC Wingersheim (9)
381.	FC Truchtersheim (9)	4–1	AS Pfulgriesheim (10)
382.	AS Willgottheim (11)	0–0 (2–3 p)	Entente Balbronn Westhoffen (12)
383.	AS Dingsheim-Griesheim (11)	3–0	ASL Duntzenheim (11)
384.	AS Nordheim-Kuttolsheim (13)	0–1	FC Steinbourg (12)
385.	FC Waldolwisheim (13)	0–5	Entente Trois Maisons-Phalsbourg (9)
386.	CO Climbach (13)	0–6	Entente Mothern Munchhausen (9)
387.	FC Trimbach (13)	0–7	US Preuschdorf-Langensoultzbach (8)
388.	FC Rott (13)	1–0	US Surbourg (11)
389.	AS Seebach (10)	1–3	FC Steinseltz (7)
390.	US Schleithal (9)	3–0	FC Niederlauterbach (10)
391.	AS Hatten (13)	2–5	AS Betschdorf (8)
392.	FC Lampertsloch-Merkswiller (12)	0–10	AS Hunspach (8)
393.	AS Wœrth (12)	1–3	FC Riedseltz (10)
394.	SC Rittershoffen (11)	0–6	FC Saint-Etienne Seltz (8)
395.	FC Niederrœdern/Olympique Schaffhouse (12)	2–3	FC Soultz-sous-Forêts/Kutzenhausen (10)
396.	Entente Drachenbronn-Birlenbach (12)	4–2 (Note: Entente Drachenbronn-Birlenbach penalised, FC Oberroedern/Aschbach qualify.)	FC Oberroedern/Aschbach (10)
397.	AS Hochfelden (8)	5–2	AS Platania Gundershoffen (9)
398.	US Gumbrechtshoffen (12)	3–1	SS Brumath (10)
399.	FC Schwindratzheim (12)	2–0	FC Eschbach (10)
400.	FC Dambach/Neunhoffen (13)	1–4	FC Niederschaeffolsheim (11)
401.	AS Wahlenheim-Bernolsheim (13)	0–5	US Wittersheim (9)
402.	FC Niedermodern (12)	3–1	FC Dauendorf (13)
403.	FC Alteckendorf (12)	0–6	FA Val de Moder (9)
404.	FCE Reichshoffen (12)	2–9	AS Ohlungen (8)
405.	ÉS Morsbronn (13)	0–3	AC Hinterfeld (11)
406.	FC Batzendorf (12)	0–3	FC Durrenbach (9)
407.	US Ettendorf (9)	2–1	AS Mertzwiller (9)
408.	Olympique Zinswiller (16)	1–9	FC Kindwiller (11)
409.	CSIE Harskirchen (12)	0–3	AS Weyer (10)
410.	US Imbsheim (11)	5–5 (3–4 p)	FC Keskastel (10)
411.	AS Rehthal (11)	0–2	AS Ingwiller/Menchhoffen (8)
412.	AS Schillersdorf (10)	3–1	AS Butten-Diemeringen (8)
413.	AS Wingen-sur-Moder (12)	1–2	FC Dossenheim-sur-Zinsel (10)
414.	AS Uhrwiller (10)	2–0	FC Mackwiller (11)
415.	US Wimmenau (11)	0–0 (5–3 p)	AS Sarrewerden (12)
416.	FC Ernolsheim-lès-Saverne (12)	0–3	AS Weinbourg (11)
417.	OC Lipsheim (10)	1–0	SR Zellwiller (11)
418.	CA Plobsheim (12)	2–0	FC Kertzfeld (12)
419.	FC Hipsheim (12)	5–2	FC Kogenheim (11)
420.	CS Fegersheim (8)	0–8	AS Erstein (7)
421.	US Meistratzheim (12)	3–0	AS Obenheim (13)
422.	FC Herbsheim (10)	1–1 (2–3 p)	ES Stotzheim (11)
423.	US Hindisheim (9)	3–2	UJ Epfig (9)
424.	AS Benfeld (13)	2–6	AS Sermersheim (9)
425.	FC Rossfeld (8)	2–5	US Nordhouse (9)
426.	FC Rhinau (9)	3–1	FC Matzenheim (10)
427.	FC Boofzheim (13)	4–5	FC Eschau (8)
428.	AS Bergbieten (12)	0–4	FCSR Obernai (7)
429.	AS Portugais Barembach-Bruche (11)	2–2 (6–7 p)	FC Dahlenheim (8)
430.	AS Bischoffsheim (9)	5–0	FC Avolsheim (13)
431.	SC Urmatt (13)	1–4	AS Natzwiller (11)
432.	FC Dangolsheim (11)	2–0	ASB Schirmeck-La Broque (9)
433.	AS Niedernai (11)	1–3	AS Wisches-Russ-Lutzelhouse (11)
434.	US Dachstein (10)	2–1	AS Heiligenstein (11)
435.	FC Rosheim (11)	3–0	CS Bernardswiller (11)
436.	SC Dinsheim (12)	3–0	SR Dorlisheim (13)
437.	AS Altorf (12)	1–2	FC Pfastatt 1926 (8)

=== Second round ===
These matches were played on 1, 2, 3 and 4 September 2022.

Second round results: Grand Est
Tie no	Home team (tier)	Score	Away team (tier)
1.	QV Douzy (8)	0–1	US Les Ayvelles (9)
2.	EM Charleville-Mézières (9)	3–5	Le Theux FC (7)
3.	ES Novion-Porcien (11)	0–1	ES Saulces-Monclin (9)
4.	Liart-Signy-l'Abbaye FC (8)	1–2	US Bazeilles (8)
5.	SOS Buzancy (11)	0–7	Rethel SF (7)
6.	AS Franco-Turque Charleville-Mézières (10)	0–2	AS Val de l'Aisne (8)
7.	FC Maubert-Fontaine (11)	0–7	AS Tournes/Renwez/Les Mazures/Arreux/Montcornet (8)
8.	Cheveuges-Saint-Aignan CO (10)	2–2 (4–3 p)	US Revin (8)
9.	AS Boulzicourt (9)	2–2 (1–4 p)	US Balan (9)
10.	USA Le Chesne (7)	0–2	Olympique Charleville Neufmanil Aiglemont (7)
11.	AS Asfeld (7)	2–2 (2–3 p)	CA Villers-Semeuse (7)
12.	Olympique Torcy-Sedan (8)	2–0	FC Blagny-Carignan (8)
13.	Olympique FC (11)	1–1 (1–3 p)	Châlons FCO (7)
14.	ASPTT Châlons (7)	6–5	US Fismes Ardre et Vesle (8)
15.	Bétheny FC (8)	0–3	US Esternay (9)
16.	AF Épernay Triomphe (8)	0–3 (Note: Tie won by means of forfeit.)	AS Cernay-Berru-Lavannes (7)
17.	Argonne FC (10)	2–4	ES Fagnières (7)
18.	ES Gaye (12)	0–5	ES Gault-Soigny (10)
19.	Reims Murigny Franco Portugais (9)	4–1	AS Gueux (10)
20.	FC Côte des Blancs (7)	0–1	Vitry FC (8)
21.	AS Marolles (12)	0–10	FCF La Neuvillette-Jamin (8)
22.	FC Bezannes 2050 (11)	0–5	FC Christo (8)
23.	ES Witry-les-Reims (9)	5–2	US Châtelraould-Les Rivières-Henruel (10)
24.	AS Cheminon (10)	1–0	SC Sézannais (7)
25.	Entente Somsois Margerie Saint-Utin (10)	0–2 (Note: Tie reversed from original draw.)	Espérance Rémoise (8)
26.	AS Mourmelon Livry Bouy (11)	0–5	US Avize-Grauves (7)
27.	FC Prunay (11)	0–1	FC Tinqueux Champagne (8)
28.	USS Sermaize (9)	1–1 (5–4 p)	AS Saint-Brice-Courcelles (9)
29.	Foyer Barsequanais (8)	2–1	ESC Melda (8)
30.	FC Vallant/Les Grès (8)	4–2	JS Vaudoise (7)
31.	AS Portugaise Nogent-sur-Seine (9)	0–1	FC Malgache (7)
32.	Romilly Champagne FC (10)	4–1	Rosières Omnisports (7)
33.	Creney FC (10)	2–4	Alliance Sud-Ouest Football Aubois (8)
34.	Amicale Saint-Germain (10)	2–4	AS Droupt-Saint-Basle (10)
35.	AS Pont-Saint-Marie (11)	3–0	JS Saint-Julien FC (7)
36.	AS Chartreux (9)	4–0	Étoile Chapelaine (9)
37.	SR Neuilly-l'Évêque (9)	0–2	AS Poissons-Noncourt (9)
38.	US Arc-en-Barrois (10)	0–4	FCCS Bragard (10)
39.	USI Blaise (7)	0–0 (3–4 p)	US Montier-en-Der (8)
40.	FC Prez Bourmont (8)	4–1	CS Chalindrey (8)
41.	AF Valcourt (10)	3–1	Espérance Saint-Dizier (7)
42.	FC Saint-Urbain (11)	0–3	ASPTT Chaumont (9)
43.	CA Rolampontais (9)	1–6	US Biesles (9)
44.	US Rouvres (11)	0–2	AS Sarrey-Montigny (7)
45.	US Bourbonnaise (10)	0–5	US Éclaron (7)
46.	AS Chamouilley Roches-sur-Marne (10)	1–1 (4–3 p)	AS Lasarjonc (10)
47.	Bar-sur-Aube FC (8)	1–3	Stade Chevillonnais (7)
48.	ES Andelot-Rimaucourt-Bourdons (8)	0–2	FC Saints-Geosmois (7)
49.	Entente Centre Ornain (8)	6–0	ES Prauthoy-Vaux (8)
50.	FC Houdemont (9)	4–5	FC Saint-Mihiel (9)
51.	ES Laneuveville (9)	2–2 (9–8 p)	FC Pulnoy (7)
52.	FC Écrouves (9)	5–0	ES Tilly-Ambly Villers-Bouquemont (10)
53.	FC Dieulouard (9)	0–3	ES Heillecourt (7)
54.	ES Custines-Malleloy (9)	1–0	AS Grand Couronné (9)
55.	FC Saint-Max-Essey (8)	1–1 (4–2 p)	FC Toul (9)
56.	AS Velaine-en-Haye (11)	0–2	CS&O Blénod-Pont-à-Mousson (7)
57.	Olympique Haussonville (10)	5–2	FC Fains-Véel (9)
58.	AS Lay-Saint-Christophe/Bouxieres-aux-Dames (7)	3–0	Omnisports Frouard Pompey (9)
59.	AS Gondreville (8)	2–2 (4–5 p)	COS Villers (7)
60.	US Behonne-Longeville-en-Barois (8)	5–1	MJC Pichon (9)
61.	AS Ludres (8)	2–1	ENJ Val-de-Seille (8)
62.	FC Seichamps (9)	4–2	AS Dommartin-lès-Toul (10)
63.	Lorraine Vaucouleurs (9)	1–3	AF Laxou Sapinière (7)
64.	AS Chavigny (11)	7–0	ES Maizey-Lacroix (9)
65.	AJS René II (10)	3–2	AS Tréveray (9)
66.	ES Lérouvillois Cheminote (10)	0–4	ASC Saulxures-lès-Nancy (9)
67.	US Rosières-aux-Salines (10)	1–2	AS Laneuveville Marainviller (9)
68.	AS MJC Blâmont (10)	2–2 (11–12 p)	AS Bettborn Hellering (9)
69.	US Saint-Louis Lutzelbourg (10)	4–4 (5–4 p)	FR Thiaville (11)
70.	FC Dieuze (9)	2–0	EF Delme-Solgne (9)
71.	AS Brouviller (10)	0–11	FC Lunéville (7)
72.	AS Morhange (7)	2–1	AS Réding (8)
73.	Espérance Gerbéviller (10)	3–1	Sportive Lorquinoise (10)
74.	FC Abreschviller (10)	0–0 (3–0 p)	USF Brouderdorff (8)
75.	FC Château-Salins (9)	1–3	AC Blainville-Damelevières (7)
76.	FC Troisfontaines (10)	1–4	SC Baccarat (10)
77.	FC Martigny-les-Bains (10)	2–5	AS Gironcourt (10)
78.	AS Saint-Nabord (9)	2–2 (7–6 p)	US Mirecourt-Hymont (10)
79.	CS Charmes (9)	2–3	AS Plombières (10)
80.	SM Bruyères (9)	12–1	Dogneville FC (10)
81.	RF Bulgnéville (10)	3–1	US Arches-Archettes-Raon (10)
82.	AS Ramonchamp (10)	0–1	FC Hadol-Dounoux (8)
83.	AS Vagney (8)	0–0 (5–4 p)	GS Haroué-Benney (8)
84.	US Senones (12)	0–1	FC Val d'Ajol (11)
85.	ASC Dompaire (10)	1–3	FC Amerey Xertigny (9)
86.	ASL Coussey-Greux (10)	1–2	FC Haute Moselotte (9)
87.	GS Vézelise (11)	1–4	ES Golbey (7)
88.	FC Neufchâteau-Liffol (10)	1–1 (3–4 p)	Bulgnéville Contrex Vittel FC (8)
89.	FC Des Ballons (9)	0–1	FC Éloyes (7)
90.	SR Saint-Dié (7)	3–2	ES Avière Darnieulles (8)
91.	FC Dommartin-lès-Remiremont (11)	1–1 (6–5 p)	AS Girancourt-Dommartin-Chaumousey (8)
92.	RC Corcieux (11)	2–2 (6–5 p)	FC Vierge (10)
93.	Association Saint-Laurent-Mangiennes (9)	0–5	JS Audunoise (9)
94.	AS Mercy-le-Bas (10)	0–6	FC Hagondange (7)
95.	US Fontoy (9)	7–2	AS Volstroff (10)
96.	TS Bertrange (9)	2–1	RS Ottange-Nondkeil (10)
97.	RC Nilvange (10)	6–2	JL Knutange (11)
98.	JS Distroff (11)	3–3 (3–2 p)	ES Longuyon (9)
99.	USAG Uckange (7)	4–0	CS Veymerange (7)
100.	JS Manom (11)	1–5	FC Yutz (7)
101.	Entente Réhon Villers Morfontaine (10)	0–7	FC Hettange-Grande (7)
102.	Olympic Saint Charles Haucourt (11)	3–3 (4–2 p)	ASC Basse-Ham (9)
103.	US Oudrenne (10)	1–1 (1–4 p)	AS Algrange (8)
104.	US Illange (9)	0–2	ES Kœnigsmacker-Kédange (8)
105.	AS Talange (9)	5–1	CSP Réhon (9)
106.	US Beuveille (11)	2–6	SC Terville (10)
107.	FC Hayange (9)	0–0 (5–4 p)	Val de l'Orne FC (7)
108.	USB Longwy (9)	1–2	Entente Bure-Boulange (9)
109.	JSA Yutz Cité (11)	0–2	JS Thil (10)
110.	US Ban-Saint-Martin (9)	0–8	RS Magny (7)
111.	AS Saint-Julien-lès-Metz (7)	2–0	ES Fameck (7)
112.	AS du Plateau Sainte-Marie-aux-Chênes (11)	1–2	RS Amanvillers (7)
113.	US Briey (8)	1–0	UL Plantières Metz (7)
114.	AS Montigny-lès-Metz (7)	0–2	FC Trémery (7)
115.	US Thierville (8)	0–9	FC Verny-Louvigny-Cuvry (8)
116.	AS Sainte-Barbe Sanry Méchy (11)	1–1 (3–4 p)	Athletic Cuvry Augny (9)
117.	ES Woippy (9)	2–5	ES Rosselange Vitry (7)
118.	ES Courcelles-sur-Nied (9)	3–2	ESAP Metz (7)
119.	AS Corny (11)	0–6	US ACLI Metz (9)
120.	RS La Maxe (9)	2–3	US Châtel Conquistadors (8)
121.	Entente Gravelotte-Verneville (11)	0–2	FC Devant-les-Ponts Metz (8)
122.	Ars-sur-Moselle FC (10)	0–3	ES Marange-Silvange (8)
123.	AS Ay-sur-Moselle (11)	2–1	ES Metz (8)
124.	AS Metz Patrotte (11)	1–7	AS Clouange (8)
125.	FC Novéant (9)	10–1	SC Les Islettes (10)
126.	FC Woippy (10)	2–4	SF Verdun Belleville (8)
127.	FC Bruch (12)	2–4	SR Creutzwald 03 (8)
128.	AS Freybouse-Frémestroff (12)	1–4	SSEP Hombourg-Haut (7)
129.	FC Longeville-lès-Saint-Avold (8)	2–2 (5–3 p)	FC Freyming (8)
130.	US Behren-lès-Forbach (7)	4–1	Étoile Naborienne Saint-Avold (7)
131.	CO Bouzonville (10)	0–0 (4–3 p)	FC Coume (9)
132.	AS Grostenquin Bérig Bistroff (10)	1–1 (2–3 p)	FC Carling (10)
133.	ES Lixing-Laning 95 (10)	2–5	FC Folschviller (9)
134.	US Valmont (8)	1–3	SO Merlebach (8)
135.	AS Falck (10)	0–1	Flétrange SA (12)
136.	JS Rémering (11)	2–3	ES Macheren Petit-Ebersviller (9)
137.	AS Guerting (11)	0–1	AS Hellimer (9)
138.	ES Wies-Woelf 93 (10)	0–1	AS Neunkirch (8)
139.	CS Diebling (10)	1–5	Achen-Etting-Schmittviller (7)
140.	FC Metzing (9)	1–2	ES Rimling-Erching-Obergailbach (10)
141.	ES Pays du Bitche 2020 (10)	3–2	AS Bliesbruck (8)
142.	US Saint-Jean-Rohrbach (11)	2–2 (4–5 p)	US Woustviller (11)
143.	US Farébersviller 05 (9)	6–0	SO Ippling (10)
144.	AS Montbronn (9)	3–0	AS Kalhausen (10)
145.	FC Sarralbe (9)	0–0 (4–5 p)	US Nousseviller (7)
146.	Entente Schorbach Hottviller Volmunster 13 (11)	1–1 (4–5 p)	Entente Petit-Réderching Siersthal (12)
147.	US Rouhling (10)	2–2 (2–1 p)	CS Wittring (11)
148.	AS Lixing-lès-Rouhling (11)	1–0	US Alsting-Zinzing (10)
149.	US Roth (11)	3–2	FC Lemberg-Saint-Louis (10)
150.	FC Rosenau (10)	0–3	FC Kappelen (10)
151.	AS Rixheim (10)	2–4	FC Hagenthal-Wentzwiller (8)
152.	AS Riespach (11)	0–6	US Wittenheim (7)
153.	Entente Hagenbach-Balschwiller (10)	4–4 (2–4 p)	AS Blotzheim (7)
154.	AS Hochstatt (11)	3–0	FC Traubach (10)
155.	AS Hausgauen (12)	2–2 (4–2 p)	FC Riedisheim (8)
156.	FC Baldersheim (9)	2–3	FC Bartenheim (7)
157.	Entente Grentzingen-Bettendorf (11)	3–5	US Hirsingue (8)
158.	Alliance Folgensbourg Muespach (10)	2–2 (6–7 p)	FC Pays Rhénan (8)
159.	RC Mulhouse (10)	– (Note: Match not played due to RC Mulhouse being removed from the competition (see first round tie 291).)	FC Pfastatt 1926 (8)
160.	Montreux Sports (9)	0–1	FC Sausheim (9)
161.	FC Anatolie Mulhouse (10)	1–0	Real ASPTT Mulhouse CF (8)
162.	FC Steinbrunn-le-Bas (10)	1–6	RC Dannemarie (8)
163.	FC Niederhergheim (8)	5–1	AS Heimsbrunn (9)
164.	AS Andolsheim (11)	1–0	FC Meyenheim (9)
165.	FC Buhl (10)	2–5	ASL Kœtzingue (7)
166.	AS Raedersheim (8)	1–1 (7–8 p)	FC Morschwiller-le-Bas (8)
167.	US Pulversheim FC (9)	2–2 (4–3 p)	AS Pfaffenheim (9)
168.	FC Roderen (11)	1–2	FC Oberhergheim (11)
169.	Mouloudia Mulhouse (7)	2–0	Stade Burnhauptois (7)
170.	FC Gundolsheim (10)	1–0	CS Mulhouse Bourtzwiller (9)
171.	ASCA Wittelsheim (10)	2–3	FC Wintzfelden-Osenbach (7)
172.	AS Lutterbach (9)	4–1	FC Masevaux (10)
173.	FC Rouffach (8)	3–0	US Vallée de la Thur (8)
174.	FCRS Richwiller (8)	2–6	FC Fessenheim (8)
175.	AS Coteaux Mulhouse (11)	2–2 (4–2 p)	AGIIR Florival (8)
176.	FC Hilsenheim (12)	9–5	US Scherwiller (8)
177.	SC Maisonsgoutte (13)	0–19	US Baldenheim (9)
178.	FC Ebersmunster (14)	0–2	FC Grussenheim (10)
179.	AS Munster (8)	0–3	FC Illhaeusern (7)
180.	FC Colmar Unifié (12)	0–7	AS Canton Vert (10)
181.	FC Vogelgrun Obersaasheim (13)	2–1	AS Elsenheim (11)
182.	FC Ostheim-Houssen (8)	4–0	RC Kintzheim (9)
183.	AS Turckheim (10)	1–2	FC Artolsheim (9)
184.	FC Bennwihr (9)	3–6	Racing HW 96 (8)
185.	AS Saint-Hippolyte (12)	1–4	AS Marckolsheim (10)
186.	SC Sélestat (8)	2–1	AS Ribeauvillé (7)
187.	SC Ebersheim (10)	0–2	FR Jebsheim-Muntzenheim (10)
188.	SC Dinsheim (12)	2–3	FC Rhinau (9)
189.	Erno FC (12)	1–2	AS Sermersheim (9)
190.	AS Natzwiller (11)	2–2 (7–8 p)	CA Plobsheim (12)
191.	AS Wisches-Russ-Lutzelhouse (11)	3–5	FC Rosheim (11)
192.	ES Molsheim-Ernolsheim (7)	2–0	US Hindisheim (9)
193.	FC Dahlenheim (8)	3–2	FCSR Obernai (7)
194.	FC Dangolsheim (11)	1–2	US Dachstein (10)
195.	AS Bischoffsheim (9)	1–5	AS Erstein (7)
196.	OC Lipsheim (10)	1–3	FC Boersch (11)
197.	FC Eschau (8)	7–1	US Nordhouse (9)
198.	FC Hipsheim (12)	2–2 (2–4 p)	US Innenheim (11)
199.	ES Stotzheim (11)	5–0	US Meistratzheim (12)
200.	AS Kilstett (12)	6–1	AS 2000 Strasbourg (12)
201.	AS Mundolsheim (8)	0–2	AS Elsau Portugais Strasbourg (7)
202.	AS Holtzheim (10)	1–1 (4–5 p)	FC Ecrivains-Schiltigheim-Bischheim (10)
203.	CS Neuhof Strasbourg (9)	0–2	US Oberschaeffolsheim (7)
204.	AS Strasbourg (9)	3–2	FC Souffelweyersheim (9)
205.	AS Neudorf (8)	5–0	FC Eckbolsheim (8)
206.	FC Krautergersheim (10)	1–6	Internationale Meinau Académie (9)
207.	ASE Cité de l'Ill Strasbourg (9)	2–3	US Ittenheim (7)
208.	US Hangenbieten (11)	0–2	FC Lampertheim (9)
209.	AS Musau Strasbourg (9)	0–6	AS Menora Strasbourg (7)
210.	FC Entzheim (11)	1–3	SR Hoenheim (9)
211.	ES Wolfisheim (13)	1–6	ALFC Duttlenheim (8)
212.	AS Hunspach (8)	1–1 (9–8 p)	FC Durrenbach (9)
213.	Entente Kaltenhouse/Marienthal (8)	2–1	US Schleithal (9)
214.	FC Rohrwiller (13)	2–3	FC Oberroedern/Aschbach (10)
215.	FC Riedseltz (10)	1–2	FC Drusenheim (7)
216.	FC Steinseltz (7)	1–0	AS Hoerdt (7)
217.	AS Ohlungen (8)	4–1	FC Saint-Etienne Seltz (8)
218.	FC Niederschaeffolsheim (11)	3–3 (4–3 p)	SC Rœschwoog (10)
219.	FC Rott (13)	1–11	FR Sessenheim-Stattmatten (9)
220.	FC Weitbruch (10)	1–0	FC Soultz-sous-Forêts/Kutzenhausen (10)
221.	AS Forstfeld (12)	1–9	US Preuschdorf-Langensoultzbach (8)
222.	Entente Mothern Munchhausen (9)	4–1	US Wittersheim (9)
223.	AS Gambsheim (8)	1–2	FC Scheibenhard (7)
224.	US Dalhunden (13)	1–10	US Oberlauterbach (7)
225.	Fatih-Sport Haguenau (11)	1–2	AS Betschdorf (8)
226.	FC Schnersheim (12)	0–8	ASI Avenir (7)
227.	Entente Balbronn Westhoffen (12)	0–4	AS Uhrwiller (10)
228.	FC Keskastel (10)	1–4	US Wimmenau (11)
229.	FC Steinbourg (12)	2–6	AS Ingwiller/Menchhoffen (8)
230.	US Gumbrechtshoffen (12)	1–8	FC Wingersheim (9)
231.	AC Hinterfeld (11)	1–0	FC Niedermodern (12)
232.	FC Saverne (8)	2–2 (4–2 p)	Entente Trois Maisons-Phalsbourg (9)
233.	AS Weyer (10)	1–3	FC Truchtersheim (9)
234.	AS Weinbourg (11)	1–2	FA Val de Moder (9)
235.	AS Hohengœft (10)	3–1	FC Kindwiller (11)
236.	ASLC Berstett (12)	0–10	AS Hochfelden (8)
237.	AS Schillersdorf (10)	0–2	US Ettendorf (9)
238.	FCE Schirrhein (7)	4–0	SC Drulingen (7)
239.	FC Dossenheim-sur-Zinsel (10)	0–1	ES Pfettisheim (8)
240.	FC Schaffhouse-sur-Zorn (11)	1–5	FC Schweighouse-sur-Moder (7)
241.	FC Schwindratzheim (12)	3–1	AS Dingsheim-Griesheim (11)

=== Third round ===
These matches were played on 8, 10 and 11 September 2022.

Third round results: Grand Est
Tie no	Home team (tier)	Score	Away team (tier)
1.	US Les Ayvelles (9)	1–8	Cormontreuil FC (6)
2.	ES Saulces-Monclin (9)	0–2	Châlons FCO (7)
3.	AS Cheminon (10)	1–3	Olympique Charleville Neufmanil Aiglemont (7)
4.	US Bazeilles (8)	2–2 (4–2 p)	US Avize-Grauves (7)
5.	ES Gault-Soigny (10)	0–5	FC Bogny (6)
6.	AS Tournes/Renwez/Les Mazures/Arreux/Montcornet (8)	1–1 (3–5 p)	ASPTT Châlons (7)
7.	FC Christo (8)	3–1	Espérance Rémoise (8)
8.	US Balan (9)	1–7	Olympique Torcy-Sedan (8)
9.	FC Tinqueux Champagne (8)	7–1	USS Sermaize (9)
10.	ES Fagnières (7)	0–5	AS Prix-lès-Mézières (5)
11.	Cheveuges-Saint-Aignan CO (10)	0–5	CA Villers-Semeuse (7)
12.	AS Val de l'Aisne (8)	0–3	EF Reims Sainte-Anne (5)
13.	Reims Murigny Franco Portugais (9)	4–0	Rethel SF (7)
14.	Le Theux FC (7)	0–3	AS Cernay-Berru-Lavannes (7)
15.	FCF La Neuvillette-Jamin (8)	8–1	ES Witry-les-Reims (9)
16.	FC Métropole Troyenne (6)	3–3 (4–3 p)	RC Épernay Champagne (5)
17.	AS Droupt-Saint-Basle (10)	0–3	US Éclaron (7)
18.	Romilly Champagne FC (10)	3–1	Foyer Barsequanais (8)
19.	US Esternay (9)	0–2	FC Malgache (7)
20.	Alliance Sud-Ouest Football Aubois (8)	3–1	AS Sarrey-Montigny (7)
21.	AS Pont-Saint-Marie (11)	1–0	Vitry FC (8)
22.	Stade Chevillonnais (7)	1–2	FC Saint-Meziery (6)
23.	FC Vallant/Les Grès (8)	1–3	FC Nogentais (6)
24.	ASPTT Chaumont (9)	2–1	Entente Centre Ornain (8)
25.	FCCS Bragard (10)	0–4	SC Marnaval (6)
26.	AS Poissons-Noncourt (9)	3–3 (2–1 p)	FC Prez Bourmont (8)
27.	FC Saints-Geosmois (7)	1–4	RCS La Chapelle (6)
28.	US Montier-en-Der (8)	2–1	AS Chartreux (9)
29.	US Biesles (9)	2–0	AS Chamouilley Roches-sur-Marne (10)
30.	AF Valcourt (10)	1–4	Chaumont FC (6)
31.	AS Saint-Nabord (9)	0–3	ES Heillecourt (7)
32.	AC Blainville-Damelevières (7)	3–3 (8–7 p)	US Vandœuvre (6)
33.	AS Chavigny (11)	0–3	SR Saint-Dié (7)
34.	FC Val d'Ajol (11)	0–10	FC Lunéville (7)
35.	RF Bulgnéville (10)	0–9	US Raon-l'Étape (5)
36.	FC Amerey Xertigny (9)	0–3	COS Villers (7)
37.	ES Laneuveville (9)	0–5	GS Neuves-Maisons (6)
38.	RC Corcieux (11)	1–12 (Note: Match stopped by the referee. FC Éloyes qualify.)	FC Éloyes (7)
39.	AS Plombières (10)	1–3	SM Bruyères (9)
40.	AS Laneuveville Marainviller (9)	2–2 (3–4 p)	FC Haute Moselotte (9)
41.	AS Gironcourt (10)	0–1	FC Hadol-Dounoux (8)
42.	AS Vagney (8)	1–2	FC Saint-Max-Essey (8)
43.	FC Dommartin-lès-Remiremont (11)	0–4	ES Golbey (7)
44.	Bulgnéville Contrex Vittel FC (8)	0–1	AS Ludres (8)
45.	SC Baccarat (10)	1–1 (0–3 p)	Espérance Gerbéviller (10)
46.	Athletic Cuvry Augny (9)	2–2 (2–4 p)	FC Verny-Louvigny-Cuvry (8)
47.	FC Dieuze (9)	1–1 (3–4 p)	CS&O Blénod-Pont-à-Mousson (7)
48.	SF Verdun Belleville (8)	3–1	FC Novéant (9)
49.	FC Écrouves (9)	2–2 (5–4 p)	AS Saint-Julien-lès-Metz (7)
50.	AF Laxou Sapinière (7)	0–0 (2–3 p)	APM Metz (6)
51.	FC Devant-les-Ponts Metz (8)	2–0	ASC Saulxures-lès-Nancy (9)
52.	US Châtel Conquistadors (8)	2–3	Jarville JF (5)
53.	Bar-le-Duc FC (6)	2–2 (10–9 p)	Entente Sorcy Void-Vacon (6)
54.	AJS René II (10)	1–2	ES Rosselange Vitry (7)
55.	FC Saint-Mihiel (9)	1–6	US Pagny-sur-Moselle (6)
56.	ES Custines-Malleloy (9)	2–1	AS Lay-Saint-Christophe/Bouxieres-aux-Dames (7)
57.	AS Ay-sur-Moselle (11)	0–2	US Behonne-Longeville-en-Barois (8)
58.	ES Courcelles-sur-Nied (9)	1–4	RS Amanvillers (7)
59.	Olympique Haussonville (10)	3–2	FC Seichamps (9)
60.	US ACLI Metz (9)	0–4	RS Magny (7)
61.	RC Nilvange (10)	8–0	Olympic Saint Charles Haucourt (11)
62.	AS Algrange (8)	1–4	ES Villerupt-Thil (6)
63.	TS Bertrange (9)	1–9	ES Thaon (5)
64.	JS Distroff (11)	3–2	ES Marange-Silvange (8)
65.	CO Bouzonville (10)	0–3	FC Hagondange (7)
66.	FC Hettange-Grande (7)	1–0	CSO Amnéville (6)
67.	FC Trémery (7)	2–3	US Thionville Lusitanos (6)
68.	FC Yutz (7)	1–1 (0–3 p)	ES Gandrange (6)
69.	SC Terville (10)	0–3	USAG Uckange (7)
70.	ES Kœnigsmacker-Kédange (8)	2–4	US Briey (8)
71.	FC Hayange (9)	0–2	FC Bassin Piennois (6)
72.	Entente Bure-Boulange (9)	0–1	JS Thil (10)
73.	AS Clouange (8)	3–4	AS Talange (9)
74.	JS Audunoise (9)	1–0	US Fontoy (9)
75.	US Woustviller (11)	2–8	ES Macheren Petit-Ebersviller (9)
76.	FC Abreschviller (10)	1–3	CA Boulay (6)
77.	SR Creutzwald 03 (8)	1–4	Sarreguemines FC (6)
78.	ES Rimling-Erching-Obergailbach (10)	0–5	US Forbach (6)
79.	AS Hellimer (9)	0–1	FC Longeville-lès-Saint-Avold (8)
80.	FC Folschviller (9)	3–1	ES Pays du Bitche 2020 (10)
81.	US Nousseviller (7)	5–1 (Note: Tie reversed from original draw.)	US Behren-lès-Forbach (7)
82.	US Roth (11)	1–3	AS Neunkirch (8)
83.	AS Lixing-lès-Rouhling (11)	0–6	SO Merlebach (8)
84.	AS Bettborn Hellering (9)	2–3	AS Morhange (7)
85.	US Saint-Louis Lutzelbourg (10)	0–5	FC Sarrebourg (6)
86.	FC Carling (10)	0–5	RC Champigneulles (5)
87.	US Rouhling (10)	1–2	Achen-Etting-Schmittviller (7)
88.	Flétrange SA (12)	0–4	SSEP Hombourg-Haut (7)
89.	Entente Petit-Réderching Siersthal (12)	0–9	US Farébersviller 05 (9)
90.	FC Anatolie Mulhouse (10)	3–2	ASL Kœtzingue (7)
91.	AS Lutterbach (9)	0–1	Mouloudia Mulhouse (7)
92.	FC Fessenheim (8)	0–3	FC Saint-Louis Neuweg (6)
93.	US Wittenheim (7)	3–2	FC Morschwiller-le-Bas (8)
94.	FC Pays Rhénan (8)	2–1	FC Hagenthal-Wentzwiller (8)
95.	US Hirsingue (8)	0–3	AS Illzach Modenheim (6)
96.	AS Coteaux Mulhouse (11)	1–4	FC Wintzfelden-Osenbach (7)
97.	FC Kappelen (10)	3–4	FC Pfastatt 1926 (8)
98.	RC Dannemarie (8)	3–3 (2–4 p)	FC Hégenheim (6)
99.	FC Gundolsheim (10)	1–1 (3–5 p)	AS Hochstatt (11)
100.	US Pulversheim FC (9)	0–4	FC Bartenheim (7)
101.	FC Sausheim (9)	1–3	AS Huningue (6)
102.	AS Blotzheim (7)	5–1	FC Rouffach (8)
103.	AS Hausgauen (12)	3–10	FC Mulhouse (6)
104.	ES Stotzheim (11)	0–5	FC Geispolsheim 01 (6)
105.	FC Oberhergheim (11)	0–1	AS Andolsheim (11)
106.	AS Sundhoffen (6)	0–1	ASC Biesheim (5)
107.	FC Rhinau (9)	3–1	AS Canton Vert (10)
108.	FC Vogelgrun Obersaasheim (13)	1–11	AS Erstein (7)
109.	FC Illhaeusern (7)	2–3	FC Ostheim-Houssen (8)
110.	FC Niederhergheim (8)	4–1	AS Marckolsheim (10)
111.	FC Grussenheim (10)	0–0 (4–5 p)	FR Jebsheim-Muntzenheim (10)
112.	US Scherwiller (8)	1–1 (3–1 p)	SC Sélestat (8)
113.	Racing HW 96 (8)	2–1	Association Still-Mutzig (6)
114.	FC Artolsheim (9)	0–1	US Baldenheim (9)
115.	AS Menora Strasbourg (7)	1–1 (9–10 p)	FA Illkirch Graffenstaden (5)
116.	FC Eschau (8)	1–1 (4–2 p)	FC Kronenbourg Strasbourg (6)
117.	SR Hoenheim (9)	2–3	US Oberschaeffolsheim (7)
118.	FC Boersch (11)	1–2	Internationale Meinau Académie (9)
119.	FC Ecrivains-Schiltigheim-Bischheim (10)	2–6	AS Neudorf (8)
120.	ALFC Duttlenheim (8)	1–2	FC Dahlenheim (8)
121.	US Dachstein (10)	0–6	ES Molsheim-Ernolsheim (7)
122.	FC Rosheim (11)	1–4	US Ittenheim (7)
123.	CA Plobsheim (12)	0–4	AS Sermersheim (9)
124.	US Innenheim (11)	0–9	FCO Strasbourg Koenigshoffen 06 (6)
125.	Entente Kaltenhouse/Marienthal (8)	4–2	AS Betschdorf (8)
126.	FC Soleil Bischheim (6)	0–0 (4–5 p)	SC Schiltigheim (5)
127.	AS Hunspach (8)	2–0	ASPV Strasbourg (6)
128.	Entente Mothern Munchhausen (9)	1–1 (9–8 p)	FC Drusenheim (7)
129.	FC Oberroedern/Aschbach (10)	0–1	AS Elsau Portugais Strasbourg (7)
130.	FC Weitbruch (10)	0–3	SS Weyersheim (6)
131.	FR Sessenheim-Stattmatten (9)	0–3	US Oberlauterbach (7)
132.	AS Kilstett (12)	1–1 (4–3 p)	US Preuschdorf-Langensoultzbach (8)
133.	FC Lampertheim (9)	1–3	FC Scheibenhard (7)
134.	FC Niederschaeffolsheim (11)	2–3	AS Strasbourg (9)
135.	AS Ingwiller/Menchhoffen (8)	7–0	FC Steinseltz (7)
136.	FC Wingersheim (9)	0–12	US Sarre-Union (5)
137.	FA Val de Moder (9)	1–1 (6–5 p)	AS Montbronn (9)
138.	AS Hochfelden (8)	2–0	ES Pfettisheim (8)
139.	AS Uhrwiller (10)	1–3	AS Ohlungen (8)
140.	US Wimmenau (11)	0–1	FC Saverne (8)
141.	FC Obermodern (6)	1–0	FCE Schirrhein (7)
142.	FC Schwindratzheim (12)	2–1	AC Hinterfeld (11)
143.	AS Hohengœft (10)	1–6	ASI Avenir (7)
144.	FC Schweighouse-sur-Moder (7)	2–5	US Reipertswiller (6)
145.	FC Truchtersheim (9)	5–1	US Ettendorf (9)

=== Fourth round ===
These matches were played on 23, 24 and 25 September 2022.

Fourth round results: Grand Est
Tie no	Home team (tier)	Score	Away team (tier)
1.	Cormontreuil FC (6)	2–2 (4–2 p)	AS Cernay-Berru-Lavannes (7)
2.	Olympique Torcy-Sedan (8)	2–4	FC Bogny (6)
3.	FC Tinqueux Champagne (8)	0–3	AS Prix-lès-Mézières (5)
4.	Reims Murigny Franco Portugais (9)	5–2	CA Villers-Semeuse (7)
5.	ASPTT Châlons (7)	2–2 (3–5 p)	FCF La Neuvillette-Jamin (8)
6.	Châlons FCO (7)	5–0	US Bazeilles (8)
7.	Olympique Charleville Neufmanil Aiglemont (7)	3–0	FC Christo (8)
8.	AS Pont-Saint-Marie (11)	2–4	US Biesles (9)
9.	Romilly Champagne FC (10)	1–2	Alliance Sud-Ouest Football Aubois (8)
10.	FC Malgache (7)	1–1 (2–4 p)	US Montier-en-Der (8)
11.	AS Poissons-Noncourt (9)	0–3	SC Marnaval (6)
12.	ASPTT Chaumont (9)	0–2	FC Saint-Meziery (6)
13.	US Éclaron (7)	1–3	FC Métropole Troyenne (6)
14.	FC Nogentais (6)	1–1 (3–4 p)	RCS La Chapelle (6)
15.	Chaumont FC (6)	0–3	EF Reims Sainte-Anne (5)
16.	FC Éloyes (7)	0–2	Bar-le-Duc FC (6)
17.	FC Saint-Max-Essey (8)	1–2	GS Neuves-Maisons (6)
18.	SM Bruyères (9)	0–0 (4–5 p)	SR Saint-Dié (7)
19.	COS Villers (7)	2–1	AC Blainville-Damelevières (7)
20.	FC Haute Moselotte (9)	2–1	Espérance Gerbéviller (10)
21.	US Behonne-Longeville-en-Barois (8)	2–5	US Raon-l'Étape (5)
22.	Olympique Haussonville (10)	0–17	SAS Épinal (4)
23.	ES Heillecourt (7)	2–1	FC Lunéville (7)
24.	AS Ludres (8)	6–0	FC Écrouves (9)
25.	ES Golbey (7)	6–1	FC Hadol-Dounoux (8)
26.	JS Audunoise (9)	1–2	ES Rosselange Vitry (7)
27.	JS Distroff (11)	1–6	RC Nilvange (10)
28.	RS Amanvillers (7)	0–6	ES Villerupt-Thil (6)
29.	USAG Uckange (7)	3–1	SF Verdun Belleville (8)
30.	US Briey (8)	1–1 (2–4 p)	FC Hettange-Grande (7)
31.	US Pagny-sur-Moselle (6)	1–2	RC Champigneulles (5)
32.	Jarville JF (5)	2–3	ES Gandrange (6)
33.	ES Custines-Malleloy (9)	1–3	FC Bassin Piennois (6)
34.	US Thionville Lusitanos (6)	4–2	FC Hagondange (7)
35.	JS Thil (10)	0–2	CS&O Blénod-Pont-à-Mousson (7)
36.	FC Longeville-lès-Saint-Avold (8)	0–0 (4–3 p)	FC Devant-les-Ponts Metz (8)
37.	ES Thaon (5)	2–0	CA Boulay (6)
38.	FC Verny-Louvigny-Cuvry (8)	2–1	US Nousseviller (7)
39.	AS Neunkirch (8)	1–1 (6–5 p)	APM Metz (6)
40.	SO Merlebach (8)	0–1	SSEP Hombourg-Haut (7)
41.	US Farébersviller 05 (9)	0–1	FC Sarrebourg (6)
42.	AS Talange (9)	3–2	FC Folschviller (9)
43.	ES Macheren Petit-Ebersviller (9)	0–4	RS Magny (7)
44.	AS Morhange (7)	0–3	US Forbach (6)
45.	Achen-Etting-Schmittviller (7)	2–2 (1–4 p)	Sarreguemines FC (6)
46.	Mouloudia Mulhouse (7)	1–0	AS Blotzheim (7)
47.	US Wittenheim (7)	2–0	FC Pays Rhénan (8)
48.	FC Ostheim-Houssen (8)	1–4	FC Saint-Louis Neuweg (6)
49.	FC Hégenheim (6)	1–2	AS Huningue (6)
50.	FC Anatolie Mulhouse (10)	1–5	FC Wintzfelden-Osenbach (7)
51.	AS Andolsheim (11)	0–2	FC Bartenheim (7)
52.	FC Mulhouse (6)	3–4	AS Illzach Modenheim (6)
53.	FC Niederhergheim (8)	1–1 (1–3 p)	Racing HW 96 (8)
54.	ASC Biesheim (5)	3–0	SR Colmar (4)
55.	AS Hochstatt (11)	1–6	FC Pfastatt 1926 (8)
56.	US Baldenheim (9)	1–2	Internationale Meinau Académie (9)
57.	FC Dahlenheim (8)	3–2	US Scherwiller (8)
58.	FC Geispolsheim 01 (6)	1–1 (4–2 p)	SS Weyersheim (6)
59.	FCO Strasbourg Koenigshoffen 06 (6)	4–0	AS Elsau Portugais Strasbourg (7)
60.	AS Strasbourg (9)	0–3	SC Schiltigheim (5)
61.	AS Neudorf (8)	3–1	FC Eschau (8)
62.	FC Rhinau (9)	2–5	FA Illkirch Graffenstaden (5)
63.	FR Jebsheim-Muntzenheim (10)	0–7	ES Molsheim-Ernolsheim (7)
64.	AS Sermersheim (9)	0–1	US Oberschaeffolsheim (7)
65.	AS Erstein (7)	6–1	US Ittenheim (7)
66.	AS Hunspach (8)	1–2	AS Ingwiller/Menchhoffen (8)
67.	FC Truchtersheim (9)	0–1	US Oberlauterbach (7)
68.	AS Kilstett (12)	1–1 (3–4 p)	FC Schwindratzheim (12)
69.	AS Hochfelden (8)	1–2	US Sarre-Union (5)
70.	ASI Avenir (7)	0–4	US Reipertswiller (6)
71.	AS Ohlungen (8)	2–0	FC Saverne (8)
72.	FA Val de Moder (9)	2–0	FC Scheibenhard (7)
73.	Entente Mothern Munchhausen (9)	3–3 (10–9 p)	FC Obermodern (6)
74.	Entente Kaltenhouse/Marienthal (8)	1–8	FCSR Haguenau (4)

=== Fifth round ===
These matches were played on 8 and 9 October 2022.

Fifth round results: Grand Est
Tie no	Home team (tier)	Score	Away team (tier)
1.	US Montier-en-Der (8)	0–2	AS Prix-lès-Mézières (5)
2.	FC Métropole Troyenne (6)	0–1	CS Sedan Ardennes (3)
3.	Olympique Charleville Neufmanil Aiglemont (7)	0–5	EF Reims Sainte-Anne (5)
4.	Reims Murigny Franco Portugais (9)	1–7	FC Saint-Meziery (6)
5.	FC Bogny (6)	1–1 (6–5 p)	Châlons FCO (7)
6.	US Biesles (9)	1–1 (5–3 p)	RCS La Chapelle (6)
7.	FCF La Neuvillette-Jamin (8)	2–2 (2–4 p)	SC Marnaval (6)
8.	Alliance Sud-Ouest Football Aubois (8)	1–5	Cormontreuil FC (6)
9.	AS Talange (9)	0–3	USAG Uckange (7)
10.	AS Ludres (8)	2–2 (4–1 p)	US Thionville Lusitanos (6)
11.	AS Nancy Lorraine (3)	17–0 (Note: Tie reversed from original draw.)	RC Nilvange (10)
12.	FC Verny-Louvigny-Cuvry (8)	0–0 (7–8 p)	COS Villers (7)
13.	FC Hettange-Grande (7)	0–0 (2–4 p)	ES Thaon (5)
14.	GS Neuves-Maisons (6)	1–3	FC Bassin Piennois (6)
15.	ES Rosselange Vitry (7)	1–1 (4–2 p)	RC Champigneulles (5)
16.	Bar-le-Duc FC (6)	0–0 (3–4 p)	ES Heillecourt (7)
17.	ES Villerupt-Thil (6)	1–0	ES Golbey (7)
18.	ES Gandrange (6)	8–1	CS&O Blénod-Pont-à-Mousson (7)
19.	FC Sarrebourg (6)	1–1 (5–4 p)	US Forbach (6)
20.	SSEP Hombourg-Haut (7)	1–0	AS Neudorf (8)
21.	FA Val de Moder (9)	0–3	FCSR Haguenau (4)
22.	RS Magny (7)	1–1 (2–4 p)	US Reipertswiller (6)
23.	US Oberlauterbach (7)	1–3	FC Geispolsheim 01 (6)
24.	AS Neunkirch (8)	0–2	US Sarre-Union (5)
25.	Entente Mothern Munchhausen (9)	1–3	Sarreguemines FC (6)
26.	SC Schiltigheim (5)	0–4	FCO Strasbourg Koenigshoffen 06 (6)
27.	AS Ingwiller/Menchhoffen (8)	1–1 (3–5 p)	AS Ohlungen (8)
28.	FC Schwindratzheim (12)	0–5	FC Longeville-lès-Saint-Avold (8)
29.	US Wittenheim (7)	0–2	FA Illkirch Graffenstaden (5)
30.	US Oberschaeffolsheim (7)	2–0	AS Erstein (7)
31.	ES Molsheim-Ernolsheim (7)	0–3	SAS Épinal (4)
32.	SR Saint-Dié (7)	2–2 (3–4 p)	FC Saint-Louis Neuweg (6)
33.	FC Pfastatt 1926 (8)	0–2	FC Dahlenheim (8)
34.	AS Huningue (6)	2–1	Mouloudia Mulhouse (7)
35.	FC Bartenheim (7)	1–3	AS Illzach Modenheim (6)
36.	FC Haute Moselotte (9)	1–3	FC Wintzfelden-Osenbach (7)
37.	US Raon-l'Étape (5)	1–0	ASC Biesheim (5)
38.	Racing HW 96 (8)	3–1	Internationale Meinau Académie (9)

=== Sixth round ===
These matches were played on 15 and 16 October 2022.

Sixth round results: Grand Est
Tie no	Home team (tier)	Score	Away team (tier)
1.	AS Ludres (8)	1–5	ES Thaon (5)
2.	EF Reims Sainte-Anne (5)	5–1	CS Sedan Ardennes (3)
3.	ES Heillecourt (7)	3–1 (Note: The match between ES Heillecourt and USAG Uckange was abandoned after a pitch invasion, and is under investigation by the committee of the Ligue de Grand Est. On 25 October 2022, the league ruled in favour of ES Heillecourt, who qualify for the seventh round.)	USAG Uckange (7)
4.	Cormontreuil FC (6)	0–1	ES Villerupt-Thil (6)
5.	AS Prix-lès-Mézières (5)	2–0	FC Bogny (6)
6.	COS Villers (7)	2–2 (7–6 p)	ES Rosselange Vitry (7)
7.	US Biesles (9)	0–2	SC Marnaval (6)
8.	FC Saint-Meziery (6)	0–1	SAS Épinal (4)
9.	FC Bassin Piennois (6)	0–4	ES Gandrange (6)
10.	Racing HW 96 (8)	0–5	FCSR Haguenau (4)
11.	AS Ohlungen (8)	0–6	AS Nancy Lorraine (3)
12.	FCO Strasbourg Koenigshoffen 06 (6)	5–0	Sarreguemines FC (6)
13.	AS Huningue (6)	0–2	US Raon-l'Étape (5)
14.	FC Dahlenheim (8)	0–3	US Sarre-Union (5)
15.	FC Longeville-lès-Saint-Avold (8)	1–4	SSEP Hombourg-Haut (7)
16.	FC Geispolsheim 01 (6)	1–1 (5–3 p)	FC Sarrebourg (6)
17.	FA Illkirch Graffenstaden (5)	0–1	FC Saint-Louis Neuweg (6)
18.	AS Illzach Modenheim (6)	3–1	FC Wintzfelden-Osenbach (7)
19.	US Reipertswiller (6)	5–2	US Oberschaeffolsheim (7)
