= Gauthier Pinaud =

French professional footballer (born 1988)

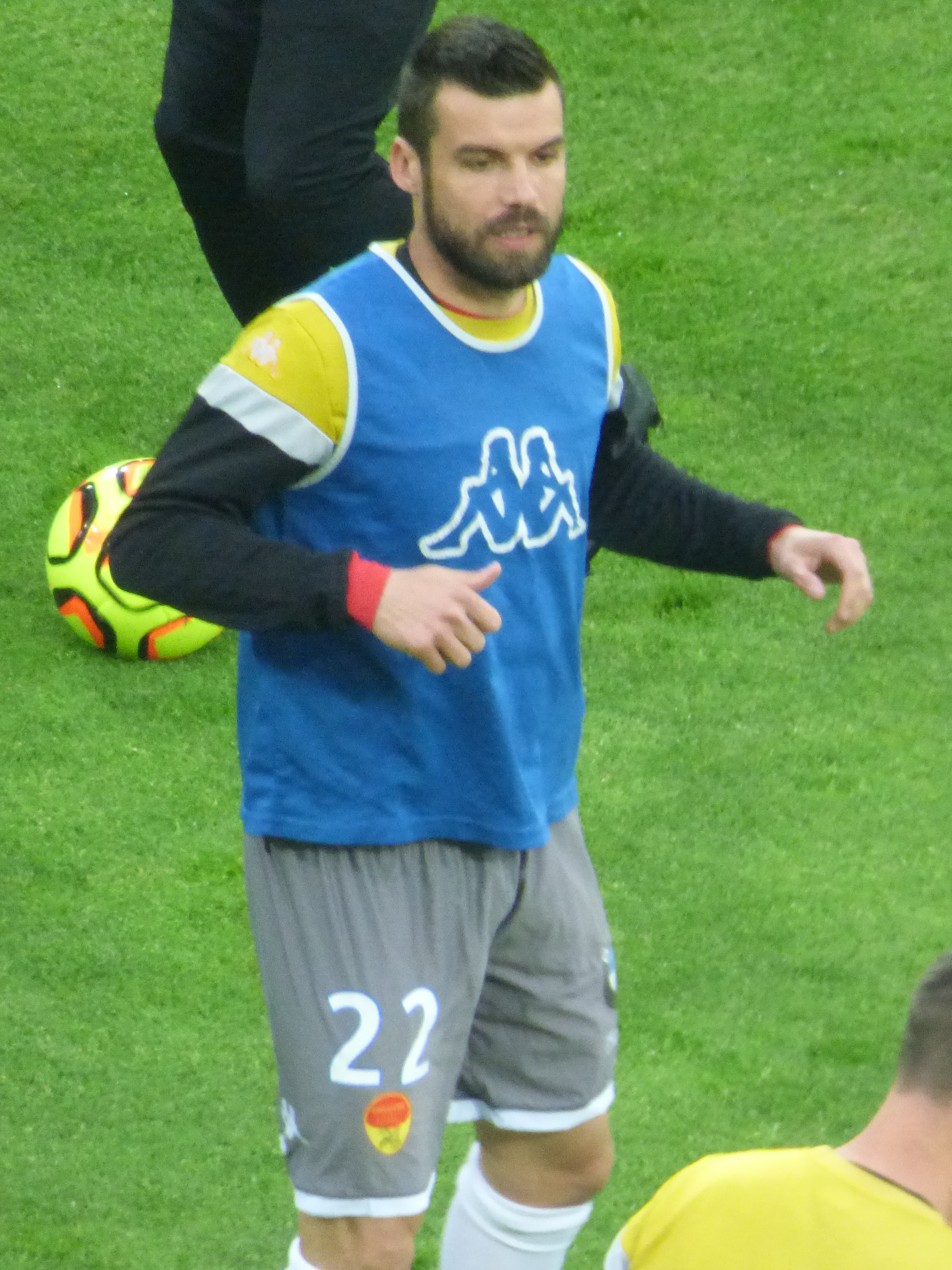

Personal information
- Date of birth: 8 January 1988 (age 38)
- Place of birth: Châteauroux, France
- Height: 1.77 m (5 ft 10 in)
- Position: Right-back

Youth career
- Châteauroux

Senior career*
Years	Team	Apps	(Gls)
2007–2011	Châteauroux	47	(1)
2011–2014	Strasbourg	67	(3)
2014–2020	Orléans	151	(1)
- * Club domestic league appearances and goals as of 14:46, 12 January 2021 (UTC)

Gauthier Pinaud (born 8 January 1988) is a French professional footballer who played most recently for Orléans as a right-back.

== Career statistics ==
As of match played on 9 March 2020

Appearances and goals by club, season and competition
Club	Season	League			Cup		League Cup		Other		Total	
Club	Season	Division	Apps	Goals	Apps	Goals	Apps	Goals	Apps	Goals	Apps	Goals
Châteauroux	2008–09	Ligue 2	9	0	0	0	—		—		9	0
Châteauroux	2009–10	Ligue 2	14	1	0	0	1	0	—		15	1
Châteauroux	2010–11	Ligue 2	21	0	1	0	—		—		22	0
Châteauroux	Total		44	1	1	0	1	0	0	0	46	1
Strasbourg	2012–13	CFA	25	1	2	1	—		—		27	2
Strasbourg	2013–14	National	33	0	0	0	—		—		33	0
Strasbourg	Total		58	1	2	1	0	0	0	0	60	2
Orléans	2014–15	Ligue 2	25	0	1	0	1	0	—		27	0
Orléans	2015–16	National	25	0	1	0	1	0	—		27	0
Orléans	2016–17	Ligue 2	25	0	0	0	2	0	2 (Note: Appearance(s) in Relegation play-offs)	0	29	0
Orléans	2017–18	Ligue 2	25	0	1	0	1	0	—		27	0
Orléans	2018–19	Ligue 2	31	0	5	0	4	0	—		40	0
Orléans	2019–20	Ligue 2	20	1	2	0	1	0	—		23	1
Orléans	Total		151	1	10	0	10	0	2	0	173	1
Orléans B	2017–18	National 3	2	0	—		—		—		2	0
Career totals			255	3	13	1	11	0	2	0	281	4
