= Jean-Pierre Truqui =

French footballer (born 1956)

Personal information
- Date of birth: 7 July 1956 (age 70)
- Place of birth: Cannes, France
- Height: 1.74 m (5 ft 9 in)
- Positions: Midfielder; defender

Youth career
- INF Vichy

Senior career*
Years	Team	Apps	(Gls)
1974–1975	INF Vichy		
1975–1981	Marseille	72	(3)
1979	→ Angoulême (loan)	20	(2)
1981–1982	Saint-Dié	20	(2)
1982–1983	Valenciennes	12	(1)
Total		124+	(8+)

Managerial career
- 1989–1990: Digne
- * Club domestic league appearances and goals

Jean-Pierre Truqui (born 7 July 1956) is a French former professional footballer who played as a midfielder and defender. In his professional career, he played for Marseille, Angoulême, Saint-Dié, and Valenciennes. He was the manager of Digne from 1989 to 1990.
