= Selim Bengriba =

French footballer (born 1980)

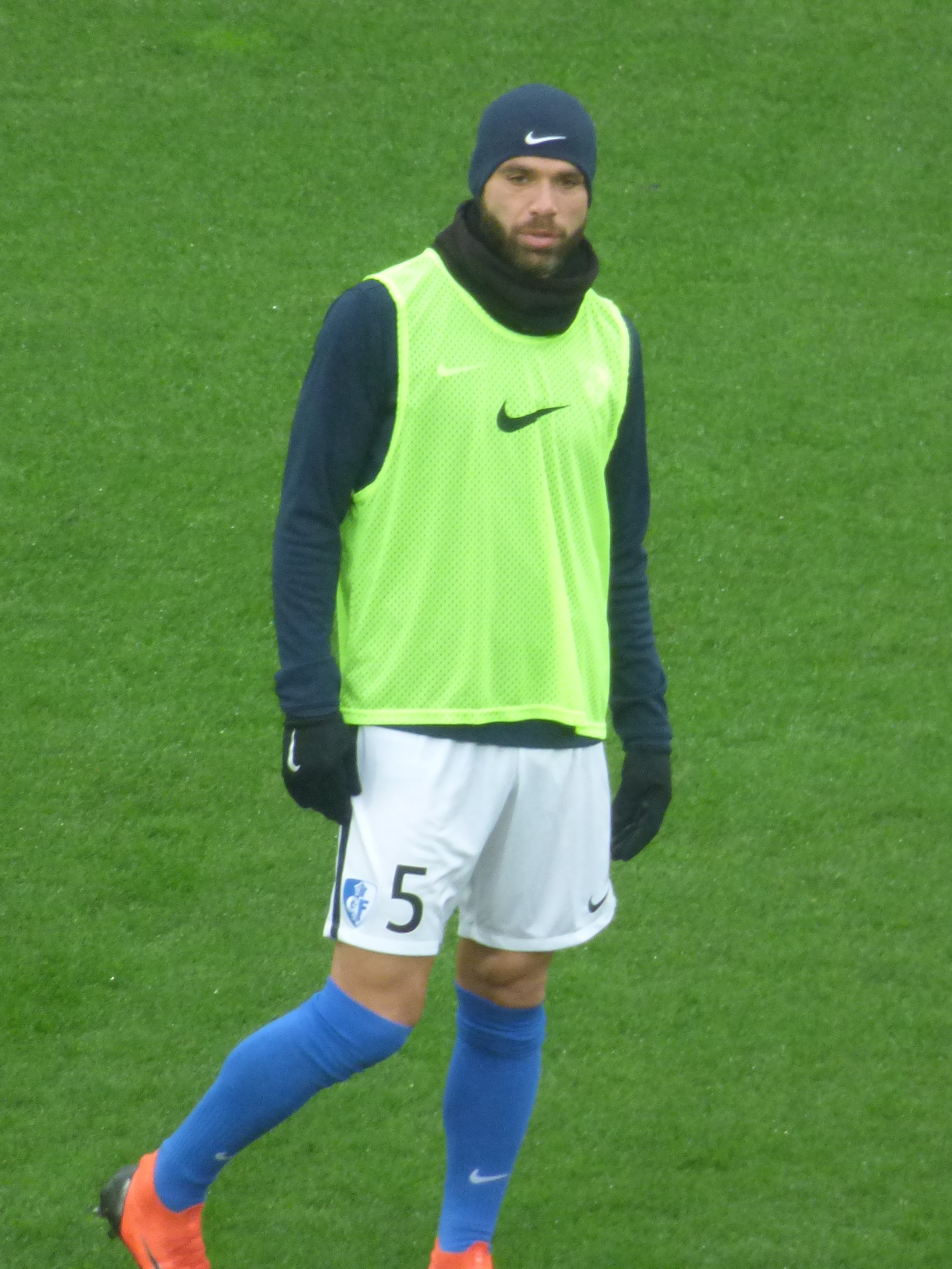
- Bengriba in november 2018.

Personal information
- Full name: Selim Bengriba
- Date of birth: 24 September 1980 (age 46)
- Place of birth: Dijon, France
- Height: 1.77 m (5 ft 10 in)
- Position: Defender

Youth career
- 1991–1998: Grenoble

Senior career*
| Years | Team | Apps | (Gls) |
| 1998–1999 | St Marcellin | | |
| 1999–2000 | Seyssinet | | |
| 2000–2007 | Échirolles | | |
| 2002–2004 | → Bourges (loan) | | |
| 2007–2011 | Chambéry | | |
| 2011–2019 | Grenoble | 175 | (7) |
- * Club domestic league appearances and goals

Selim Bengriba (born 24 September 1980) is a French former professional footballer who is best known for his career with Grenoble as a defender.

== Career ==
Bengriba began football at the age of 11 with Grenoble, and spent most of his footballing career in amateur leagues. As an amateur footballer, he had jobs as a solderer, in his local town hall, and with Caterpillar Inc. In 2011, he returned to his childhood Grenoble after they filed for bankruptcy and was tasked with bringing them back up. In 2014, he gained the captain armband at the age of 33. He managed to promote Grenoble back to Ligue 2 in 2018, after one year in the Championnat National. Bengriba signed his first professional contract with Grenoble on 13 June 2018, at the age of 37.

Bengriba made his professional debut for Grenoble in a 2–1 Coupe de la Ligue loss to Metz on 14 August 2018.

== Personal life ==
Born in France, Bengriba is of Algeria descent.
