= 2018–19 Ligue 2 =

80th season of the second-tier football league in France

Ligue 2
- Season: 2018–19
- Champions: Metz
- Promoted: Metz; Brest
- Relegated: Red Star; Béziers; Gazélec Ajaccio
- Matches: 380
- Goals: 834 (2.19 per match)
- Top goalscorer: 27 (Gaëtan Charbonnier, Brest
- Biggest home win: Lens 5–0 Gazélec Ajaccio; Round 11, 22 October 2018
- Biggest away win: Valenciennes 0–4 Clermont; Round 6, 31 August 2018; Red Star 0–4 Orléans; Round 12, 26 October 2018; Gazélec Ajaccio 0–4 Auxerre; Round 20, 11 January 2019; Sochaux 0–4 Nancy; Round 26, 1 March 2019; Red Star 0–4 Clermont; Round 29, 15 March 2019; Grenoble 0–4 Orléans; Round 31, 5 April 2019
- Highest scoring: 11 Valenciennes 5-6 Béziers; Round 33, 19 April 2019
- Longest winning run: 8 Troyes
- Longest unbeaten run: 16 Metz
- Longest winless run: 17 Niort
- Longest losing run: 7 Nancy
- Highest attendance: 33,093 Lens v Le Havre; Round 30, 1 April 2019
- Lowest attendance: 1,198 AC Ajaccio v Troyes; Round 1, 27 July 2018
- Average attendance: 6,835

The 2018–19 Ligue 2 (referred to as the Domino's Ligue 2 for sponsorship reasons) season was the 80th season since its establishment.

== Teams ==
=== Team changes ===
Promoted from 2017–18 Championnat National

- Red Star
- Béziers
- Grenoble

Relegated from 2017–18 Ligue 1

- Troyes
- Metz

Promoted to 2018–19 Ligue 1

- Reims
- Nîmes

Relegated to 2018–19 Championnat National

- Bourg-Péronnas
- Quevilly-Rouen
- Tours

=== Stadiums and locations ===
Location of teams in 2018–19 Ligue 2

Club	Location	Venue	Capacity
AC Ajaccio	Ajaccio	Stade François Coty	10,446
Auxerre	Auxerre	Stade de l'Abbé-Deschamps	21,379
Béziers	Béziers	Stade de la Méditerranée	18,555
Brest	Brest	Stade Francis-Le Blé	15,097
Châteauroux	Châteauroux	Stade Gaston Petit	17,173
Clermont Foot	Clermont-Ferrand	Stade Gabriel Montpied	11,980
Gazélec Ajaccio	Ajaccio	Stade Ange Casanova	8,000
Grenoble	Grenoble	Stade des Alpes	20,068
Le Havre	Le Havre	Stade Océane	25,178
Lens	Lens	Stade Bollaert-Delelis	37,705
Lorient	Lorient	Stade du Moustoir	18,890
Metz	Metz	Stade Saint-Symphorien	25,636
Nancy	Tomblaine	Stade Marcel Picot	20,087
Niort	Niort	Stade René Gaillard	10,886
Orléans	Orléans	Stade de la Source	7,000
Paris FC	Paris (13th arrondissement)	Stade Charléty	20,000
Red Star	Paris (Saint-Ouen)	Stade Pierre Brisson	10,198
Sochaux	Montbéliard	Stade Auguste Bonal	20,005
Troyes	Troyes	Stade de l'Aube	20,420
Valenciennes	Valenciennes	Stade du Hainaut	25,172

=== Personnel and kits ===
Team	Manager^{1}	Captain^{1}	Kit manufacturer^{1}	Main sponsor^{1}
AC Ajaccio	(France) Olivier Pantaloni	(France) Johan Cavalli	Adidas	Auchan Atrium
Auxerre	(France) Cédric Daury	(Benin) Jordan Adéoti	Macron	Remorques LOUALT
Béziers	(France) Mathieu Chabert	(Brazil) Macedo Novaes	Puma	Angelotti
Brest	(France) Jean-Marc Furlan	(France) Gaëtan Belaud	Nike	Quéguiner (H), Yaourts Malo (A)
Châteauroux	(France) Nicolas Usaï	(Cameroon) Yannick M'Bone	Nike	Monin
Clermont	(France) Pascal Gastien	(France) Julien Laporte	Patrick	Crédit Mutuel
Gazélec Ajaccio	(France) Hervé Della Maggiore	TBD	Macron	Carrefour, Casino D'Ajaccio
Grenoble	(France) Philippe Hinschberger	(France) Selim Bengriba	Nike	Carrefour, Sempa, BONTAZ
Le Havre	(France) Oswald Tanchot	(France) Alexandre Bonnet	Joma	Filiassur, SEAFRIGO Group
Lens	(France) Philippe Montanier	(Algeria) Walid Mesloub	Macron	Auchan Retail
Lorient	(France) Mickaël Landreau	(France) Fabien Lemoine	Kappa	B&B Hotels, Jean Floc'h
Metz	(France) Frédéric Antonetti	(France) Renaud Cohade	Nike	Moselle
Nancy	(France) Alain Perrin	(Cape Verde) Danilson da Cruz	Nike	Sempa
Niort	(France) Pascal Plancque	(Cameroon) Andé Dona Ndoh	Erima	Restaurant Le Billon (H), Cheminées Poujoulat (A)
Orléans	(France) Didier Ollé-Nicolle	(Algeria) Karim Ziani	Kappa	CTVL
Paris FC	(Bosnia and Herzegovina) Mehmed Baždarević	(Cameroon) Frédéric Bong	Nike	Vinci
Red Star	(Mali) Vincent Doukantié	(France) Formose Mendy	Adidas	Vice
Sochaux	(Senegal) Omar Daf	(France) Maxence Prévot	Lotto	Ledus
Troyes	(Portugal) Rui Almeida	(France) Benjamin Nivet	Kappa	Babeau Seguin
Valenciennes	(France) Réginald Ray	(France) Sébastien Roudet	Acerbis	Mutuelle Just

=== Managerial changes ===
Team	Outgoing manager	Manner of departure	Date of vacancy	Position in table	Incoming manager	Date of appointment
Sochaux	(Germany) Peter Zeidler	Signed by FC St. Gallen	14 May 2018	Pre-season	(Spain) José Manuel Aira	22 May 2018
Metz	(France) Frédéric Hantz	Resigned	20 May 2018	Pre-season	(France) Frédéric Antonetti	24 May 2018
Lens	(France) Éric Sikora	Sacked	18 May 2018	Pre-season	(France) Philippe Montanier	22 May 2018
Troyes	(France) Jean-Louis Garcia	Mutual consent	22 May 2018	Pre-season	(Portugal) Rui Almeida	30 May 2018
Paris FC	(France) Fabien Mercadal	Signed by Caen	8 June 2018	Pre-season	(Bosnia and Herzegovina) Mehmed Baždarević	15 June 2018
Grenoble	(France) Olivier Guégan	Sacked	22 June 2018	Pre-season	(France) Philippe Hinschberger	22 June 2018
Gazélec Ajaccio	(France) Albert Cartier	Sacked	9 October 2018	12th	(France) Hervé Della Maggiore	15 October 2018
Châteauroux	(France) Jean-Luc Vasseur	Sacked	9 October 2018	16th	(France) Nicolas Usaï	24 October 2018
Nancy	(France) Didier Tholot	Sacked	27 October 2018	20th	(France) Alain Perrin	27 October 2018
Red Star	(France) Régis Brouard	Sacked	29 October 2018	19th	(Bosnia and Herzegovina) Faruk Hadžibegić	29 October 2018
Sochaux	(Spain) José Manuel Aira	Sacked	25 November 2018	18th	(Senegal) Omar Daf	25 November 2018
Niort	(France) Patrice Lair	Suspended	17 December 2018	7th	(France) Jean-Philippe Faure (caretaker)	11 December 2018
Niort	(France) Jean-Philippe Faure (caretaker)	End of caretaker role	14 January 2019	8th	(France) Pascal Plancque	14 January 2019
Auxerre	(Uruguay) Pablo Correa	Sacked	18 March 2019	14th	(France) Cédric Daury (interim)	18 March 2019
Red Star	(Bosnia and Herzegovina) Faruk Hadžibegić	Mutual consent	24 March 2019	20th	(Mali) Vincent Doukantié (interim)	24 March 2019

== League table ==
Pos	Team	Pld	W	D	L	GF	GA	GD	Pts	Promotion or Relegation
1	Metz (C, P)	38	24	9	5	60	23	+37	81	Promotion to Ligue 1
2	Brest (P)	38	21	11	6	64	35	+29	74	Promotion to Ligue 1
3	Troyes	38	21	8	9	51	28	+23	71	Qualification to promotion play-offs semi-final
4	Paris FC	38	17	14	7	36	22	+14	65	Qualification to promotion play-offs quarter-final
5	Lens	38	18	9	11	49	28	+21	63	Qualification to promotion play-offs quarter-final
6	Lorient	38	17	12	9	51	41	+10	63	
7	Le Havre	38	13	15	10	45	40	+5	54	
8	Orléans	38	15	7	16	51	53	−2	52	
9	Grenoble	38	13	11	14	43	47	−4	50	
10	Clermont	38	11	15	12	44	37	+7	48	
11	Châteauroux	38	11	15	12	37	42	−5	48	
12	Niort	38	11	14	13	34	41	−7	47	
13	Valenciennes	38	11	10	17	52	61	−9	43	
14	Nancy	38	12	6	20	36	50	−14	42	
15	Auxerre	38	10	11	17	34	36	−2	41	
16	Sochaux	38	11	8	19	27	43	−16	41	
17	Ajaccio	38	9	13	16	29	45	−16	40	
18	Gazélec Ajaccio (R)	38	9	12	17	30	54	−24	39	Qualification to relegation play-offs
19	Béziers (R)	38	9	11	18	33	50	−17	38	Relegation to Championnat National
20	Red Star (R)	38	7	9	22	28	58	−30	30	Relegation to Championnat National

Source: Ligue 2
Rules for classification: 1) Points; 2) Goal difference; 3) Number of goals scored; 4) Head-to-head goal difference; 5) Fair play points
(C) Champions; (P) Promoted; (R) Relegated

== Results ==
Home \ Away	ACA	GAZ	AUX	BEZ	BRE	CHA	CLE	GRE	HAV	RCL	LOR	MET	NAL	NRT	ORL	PAR	RS	SOC	TRO	VAL
Ajaccio	—	1–2	2–1	2–1	0–2	1–1	0–0	1–2	3–2	0–2	0–0	0–0	1–1	1–0	1–0	0–0	0–0	2–3	0–1	3–1
Gazélec Ajaccio	1–0	—	0–4	0–1	1–1	1–2	0–3	2–0	1–1	1–0	1–3	0–2	0–1	0–1	0–2	1–1	2–1	0–2	2–1	0–0
Auxerre	0–0	2–3	—	2–0	0–2	1–2	1–0	4–0	0–1	1–2	0–0	0–0	1–0	0–0	3–0	0–2	0–0	1–0	0–2	1–1
Béziers	0–1	0–0	1–0	—	1–0	1–1	1–1	0–3	1–1	0–0	0–1	1–3	3–0	1–1	1–2	0–1	1–3	0–0	0–0	1–1
Brest	2–0	4–1	1–0	3–0	—	5–1	0–0	3–1	1–0	2–0	3–2	0–1	2–1	3–0	3–1	1–1	1–1	1–0	1–1	2–5
Châteauroux	2–2	0–1	0–0	2–0	2–2	—	2–2	2–2	1–0	0–0	1–2	1–2	1–0	2–1	1–2	0–1	1–1	1–0	0–3	1–1
Clermont	0–0	1–1	2–0	2–0	2–2	0–0	—	1–1	0–0	0–0	0–1	2–3	2–3	3–2	3–0	1–1	0–0	1–0	2–4	0–1
Grenoble	2–0	1–1	0–0	4–2	1–2	0–0	1–0	—	0–0	0–2	0–1	1–1	1–0	1–0	0–4	0–1	2–0	1–0	0–2	4–2
Le Havre	3–1	2–2	1–1	2–3	1–1	2–1	0–0	1–1	—	2–1	2–3	2–2	0–2	0–0	3–1	2–1	1–0	3–2	1–1	4–3
Lens	1–2	5–0	2–0	3–0	2–1	0–1	1–0	0–0	0–0	—	0–1	0–0	2–1	4–1	5–2	0–0	1–0	2–0	2–0	0–0
Lorient	1–0	0–1	2–2	3–1	1–1	2–1	0–0	1–0	0–0	2–2	—	0–0	4–1	1–1	1–3	2–1	2–1	0–0	0–3	3–1
Metz	3–1	1–0	0–1	1–0	1–0	2–1	1–2	1–1	0–1	2–0	2–1	—	3–0	3–0	5–1	2–0	2–0	1–1	1–1	3–0
Nancy	1–0	3–1	1–0	0–2	2–3	0–1	0–1	1–2	0–1	0–3	3–2	1–0	—	0–1	1–0	1–2	1–0	0–0	1–1	0–2
Niort	2–0	1–1	0–0	0–0	1–1	0–1	4–2	1–1	1–0	1–2	2–2	0–3	1–1	—	1–1	1–0	1–0	0–1	1–1	1–0
Orléans	1–3	2–2	0–3	0–0	0–0	2–0	2–1	0–3	1–1	0–2	2–0	0–1	1–2	1–0	—	4–0	2–2	2–0	0–1	1–0
Paris FC	1–1	1–0	3–0	1–0	0–1	0–0	3–0	1–0	1–0	2–0	2–2	2–1	2–0	0–0	0–0	—	1–1	0–0	2–0	0–0
Red Star	2–0	1–1	1–0	0–3	0–2	1–3	0–4	2–3	0–1	1–0	0–3	1–2	1–1	1–2	0–4	0–1	—	3–0	0–3	1–0
Sochaux	0–0	2–0	1–4	1–0	2–0	0–0	2–1	3–1	1–3	0–1	1–0	1–2	0–4	0–3	0–1	1–0	1–2	—	0–0	0–1
Troyes	0–0	1–0	1–0	0–1	1–2	1–0	0–1	2–1	2–1	1–0	2–0	0–1	2–1	2–0	3–2	0–1	2–0	1–2	—	4–2
Valenciennes	4–0	0–0	3–1	5–6	1–3	1–1	0–4	3–2	1–0	4–2	1–2	0–2	1–1	1–2	1–4	0–0	4–1	1–0	0–1	—

Source: Ligue 2
Legend: Blue = home team win; Yellow = draw; Red = away team win.
For upcoming matches, an "a" indicates there is an article about the rivalry between the two participants.

== Promotion play-offs ==
A promotion play-off competition was held at the end of the season, involving the 3rd, 4th and 5th-placed teams in 2018–19 Ligue 2, and the 18th-placed team in 2018–19 Ligue 1.

The quarter-final was played on 21 May and the semi-final was played on 24 May.

Quarter-final
4B	Paris FC	1 (4)
5B	Lens (p)	1 (5)

Semi-final
3B	Troyes	1
5B	Lens (a.e.t.)	2

Final
5B	Lens	1	1	2
18A	Dijon	1	3	4

== Relegation play-offs ==
A relegation play-off was held at the end of the season between the 18th-placed Ligue 2 team and the 3rd-placed team of 2018–19 Championnat National. This was played over two legs on 28 May and 2 June.

28 May 2019
20:45 CEST

Le Mans	1–2	Gazélec Ajaccio
Boissier 53'	Report	Blayac 14'; Jobello 48'

MMArena, Le Mans
Attendance: 22,800
Referee: François Letexier

2 June 2019
20:45 CEST

Gazélec Ajaccio	0–2	Le Mans
	Report	Boissier 73'; Mamadou 90+7'

Stade Ange Casanova, Ajaccio
Attendance: 3,500
Referee: Mikael Lesage

Le Mans won 3–2 on aggregate and were promoted to Ligue 2, while Gazélec Ajaccio were relegated to the Championnat National.

== Post-season actions and reprieves ==
On 12 June 2019, the financial regulator of French football, the DNCG announced that Nancy and Sochaux would be relegated to Championnat National due to their financial position. The decision is appealable, and both teams have indicated that they are appealing. Should one or more of the decisions be upheld at appeal, then Gazélec Ajaccio and Béziers would be reprieved from relegation in that order.

On 25 June 2019, the DNCG announced that AC Ajaccio would also be relegated to Championnat National due to their financial position. The club have indicated they are appealing. If this decision is upheld at appeal in addition to those of Nancy and Sochaux, then Red Star would also be reprieved from relegation.

On 3 July 2019, Nancy successfully appealed the DNCG decision, and will remain in Ligue 2.

On 8 July 2019, it was announced that Sochaux had successfully appealed the DNCG decision, and will remain in Ligue 2.

On 12 July 2019, it was announced that AC Ajaccio would remain in Ligue 2, having been successful in their appeal.

== Top scorers ==
As of 17 May 2019

Rank	Player	Club	Goals
1	(France) Gaëtan Charbonnier	Brest	27
2	(Senegal) Habib Diallo	Metz	26
3	(France) Pierre-Yves Hamel	Lorient	19
4	(France) Florian Ayé	Clermont	18
5	(Senegal) Yannick Gomis	Lens	16
6	(France) Alexis Claude-Maurice	Lorient	14
6	(Tunisia) Yoann Touzghar	Troyes	14
8	(France) Romain Armand	Gazélec Ajaccio	13
8	(Cameroon) Andé Dona Ndoh	Niort	13
10	(France) Florian Sotoca	Grenoble	12
10	(Martinique) Kévin Fortuné	Lens (1) and Troyes (11)	12

== Attendances ==
No.	Club	Average
1	Lens	26,427
2	Metz	11,864
3	Nancy	11,054
4	Stade brestois	9,216
5	Valenciennes	8,393
6	Lorient	7,350
7	Sochaux	6,945
8	ESTAC	6,838
9	Havre AC	6,734
10	Grenoble	6,412
11	AJ auxerroise	6,207
12	La Berrichonne	4,489
13	Orléans	4,155
14	Paris FC	3,849
15	Chamois niortais	3,473
16	Clermont	2,817
17	Béziers	2,788
18	Gazélec	2,651
19	Ajaccio	2,569
20	Red Star	2,303
