= Stéphen Vincent (footballer) =

French footballer (born 1986)

Personal information
- Date of birth: 2 September 1986 (age 40)
- Place of birth: Neuilly-sur-Marne, France
- Height: 1.74 m (5 ft 9 in)
- Positions: Attacking midfielder; striker

Senior career*
Years	Team	Apps	(Gls)
2003–2008	Saint-Étienne	0	(0)
2006–2007	→ Raon-l'Étape (loan)	27	(5)
2007–2008	→ Gueugnon (loan)	25	(3)
2009–2010	Cannes	36	(1)
2010–2011	Paris FC	29	(4)
2011–2013	Rouen	54	(4)
2013–2014	Martigues	27	(8)
2014–2016	Boulogne	32	(4)
2014–2016	Boulogne B	2	(0)
2016–2020	Le Mans	80	(5)
- * Club domestic league appearances and goals

Stéphen Vincent (born 2 September 1986) is a former French footballer who last played for Le Mans in Ligue 2.

He previously played in Ligue 2 for FC Gueugnon, and had a lengthy career in the lower divisions.

He retired at the end of the 2019–20 season.
