= SR Saint-Dié =

French football club

Saint-Dié
- Full name: Sports Réunis Déodatiens
- Founded: 1946
- Dissolved: 2019
- Ground: Stade Émile Jeanpierre
- Capacity: 1,200

Sports Réunis Déodatiens, known as SR Saint-Dié or simply Saint-Dié, was a football club based in Saint-Dié-des-Vosges, France.

== Notable players ==
- (France) Richard Déziré
- (Croatia) Branko Gračanin
- (Bosnia and Herzegovina) Amar Osim
- (France) Gérard Prêcheur
- (France) Robert Rico
- (Mali) Adama Traoré
- (France) Jean-Pierre Truqui
- (Senegal) Kalidou Koulibaly (youth)
