= Rui Almeida =

Portuguese association football coach

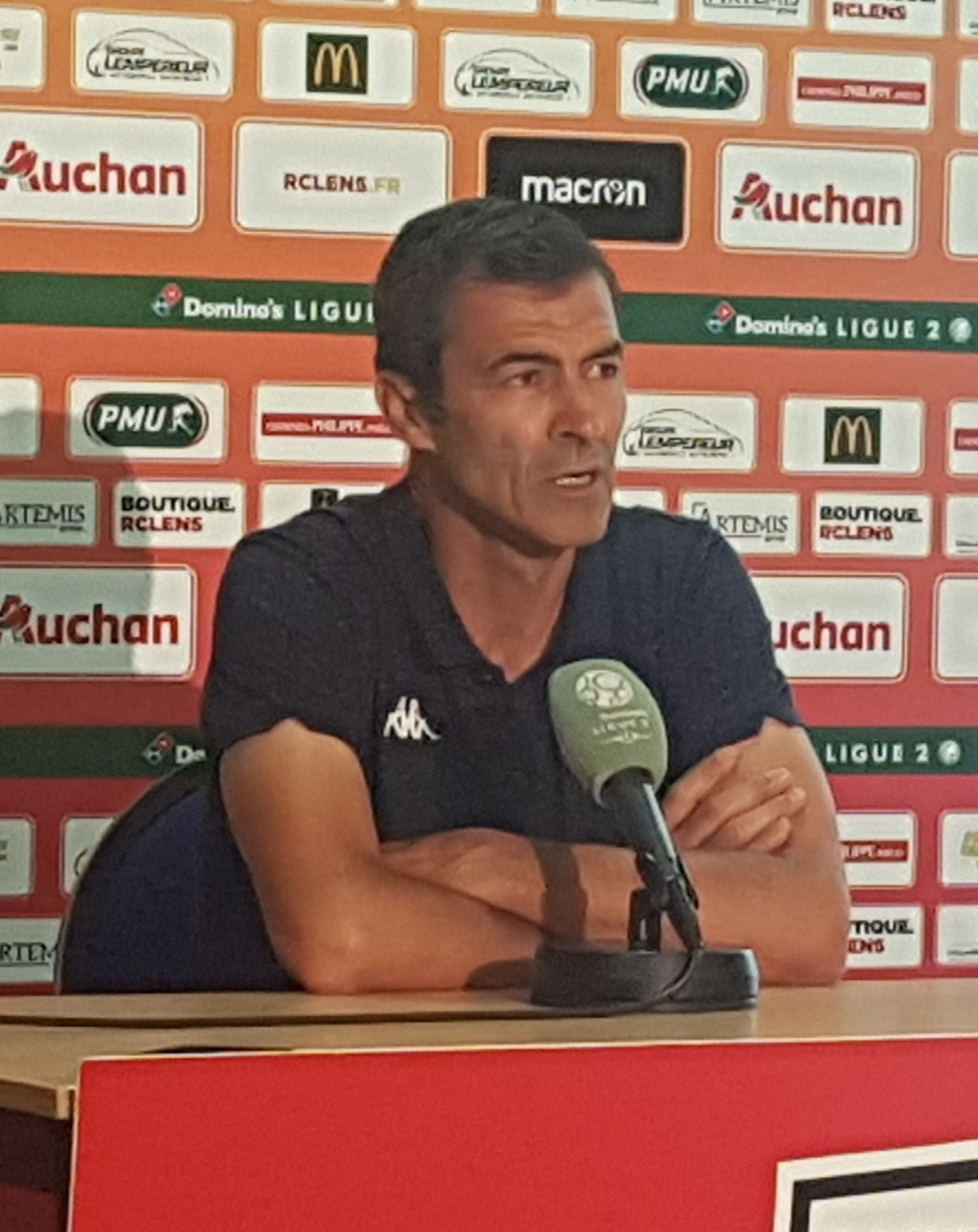
- Almeida as Troyes manager in 2018

Personal information
- Full name: Rui Miguel Garcia Lopes de Almeida
- Date of birth: 29 September 1969 (age 57)
- Place of birth: Lisbon, Portugal

Managerial career
- Years: Team
- 2002–2008: Estoril (assistant)
- 2008–2010: Trofense (assistant)
- 2010–2012: Syria U23
- 2012: Panathinaikos (assistant)
- 2013: Sporting CP (assistant)
- 2013–2014: Braga (assistant)
- 2015: Zamalek (assistant)
- 2015–2016: Red Star
- 2017: Bastia
- 2018–2019: Troyes
- 2019: Caen
- 2020: Gil Vicente
- 2022–2023: Niort
- 2023–2024: JS Kabylie
- 2024: Al-Batin
- 2025–2026: Difaâ Hassani El Jadidi
- 2026: MAS Fez

Rui Miguel Garcia Lopes de Almeida (born 29 September 1969) is a Portuguese professional football manager.

After working as an assistant to Jesualdo Ferreira, he worked mainly in France, with Bastia in Ligue 1 and four clubs in Ligue 2, as well as a brief spell in his country's Primeira Liga with Gil Vicente.

== Managerial career ==
Almeida spent his early managerial career as an assistant at Estoril and Trofense. His first stint as a professional manager was with the Syria under-23 team in an attempt for qualification to the 2012 Summer Olympics. A polyglot (speaking Portuguese, Italian, Spanish, Arabic, English and French), he left Syria to become assistant manager to Jesualdo Ferreira at Panathinaikos, Sporting, Braga and Zamalek before managing again with Red Star in Ligue 2 in June 2015. He was dismissed in December 2016 when the club was in 16th, and had been eliminated from the Coupe de France by fifth-tier Blagnac.

Almeida then joined Bastia in Ligue 1 in February 2017, on a two-and-a-half-year contract; the Corsican team was five points within the relegation zone. He left in June, as the team faced a financial crisis after their descent.

On 30 May 2018, Almeida was announced as the manager of Troyes in Ligue 2, on a two-year deal. He led the team to third, one point off promotion, in his only season and was then linked to English club West Bromwich Albion, though no official approach was ever made.

In July 2019, Almeida was appointed manager of Caen, newly relegated to Ligue 2. He signed a two-year deal with the option of a third, and compensation was paid for his remaining year contracted to Troyes. After a poor start to the season, he was removed from his duties on 28 September.

Almeida was given his first outright job in his own country at the end of May 2020, when he was chosen to succeed Vítor Oliveira at Gil Vicente in the Primeira Liga. He lost his job on 10 November, having won once in seven games and lost the last four.

On 4 September 2022, Almeida returned to the French second tier, taking over at Niort ahead of the seventh game of the season, on a one-year contract with a second as an option. He left the bottom-placed team by mutual accord the following 1 February after recording four wins, five draws and nine defeats, including his last three games.

On 14 October 2023, Almeida was appointed manager of Algerian club JS Kabylie. Having taken 12 points from a possible 20, he was sacked on 2 March and replaced by Azzedine Aït Djoudi.

Almeida was appointed as manager of Saudi First Division League club Al Batin FC on 15 July 2024. On 16 October 2024, Al-Batin announced the departure of Almeida from the club.

On 25 January 2025, Almeida signed with Moroccan club Difaâ Hassani El Jadidi in Botola Pro.
