= Richard Déziré =

French football manager (born 1972)

Personal information
- Date of birth: 24 September 1972 (age 54)
- Place of birth: Mont-Saint-Aignan, France
- Height: 1.74 m (5 ft 9 in)
- Position: Midfielder

Senior career*
Years	Team	Apps	(Gls)
1992–1995	Rouen		
1995–1996	Tours		
1996–1997	Pacy Vallée-d'Eure		
1997–1998	Raon-l'Étape		
1998–2001	Saint-Dié		

Managerial career
- 2002–2005: Raon-l'Étape
- 2005–2006: US Quevilly
- 2007–2012: Raon-l'Étape
- 2012–2015: Avranches
- 2015–2020: Le Mans
- 2020–2021: Créteil
- 2021–2022: Cholet
- * Club domestic league appearances and goals

Richard Déziré (born 24 September 1972) is a French football manager and former player who played as a midfielder.

== Early career ==
Born in Mont-Saint-Aignan, Seine-Maritime, Déziré played for Rouen, the major club in his local area, for whom he made eight appearances in Division 2, and went on to represent Tours, Pacy Vallée-d'Eure, Raon-l'Étape and Saint-Dié before retiring as a player in 2001.

== Managerial career ==
Déziré began his managerial career the following year, with his old club, Raon-l'Étape. In his first season, he led them to promotion from the Championnat de France Amateur (CFA) to the third-tier Championnat National, and kept them up for the next two seasons, albeit leaving it to the last match of the season in each case. After a season with US Quevilly, in which Déziré kept the team in the CFA, he quit.

Déziré returned to Raon during the 2006–07 season, but was unable to prevent their relegation back to the CFA. He stayed for a further five years, and led the team to two appearances in the last 32 of the Coupe de France. He left at the end of the 2011–12 season, and joined CFA team US Avranches. In his second season, Déziré led Avranches to promotion to the Championnat National, and kept them up in the 2014–15 season, as well as taking the team to the last 32 of the Coupe de France. Nevertheless, Déziré's contract was not renewed; the club's president Gilbert Guérin had no complaints about his footballing or financial performance but found him too difficult to work with.

In June 2015, Déziré signed a two-year contract as manager of CFA2 club Le Mans. After four-and-a-half years, during which he led the team through three consecutive promotions, from the fifth tier back to Ligue 2, Déziré was dismissed on 23 February 2020 with the team second bottom of the table.

In December 2020, Déziré was appointed manager of Créteil until the end of the 2020–21 season. On 24 February 2021, exactly two months after his appointment, Déziré was sacked following a just one league victory, and seeing his side knocked out of the Coupe de France.

In May 2021, he was announced as manager of SO Cholet.
