= Bruno Luzi =

French football manager (born 1965)

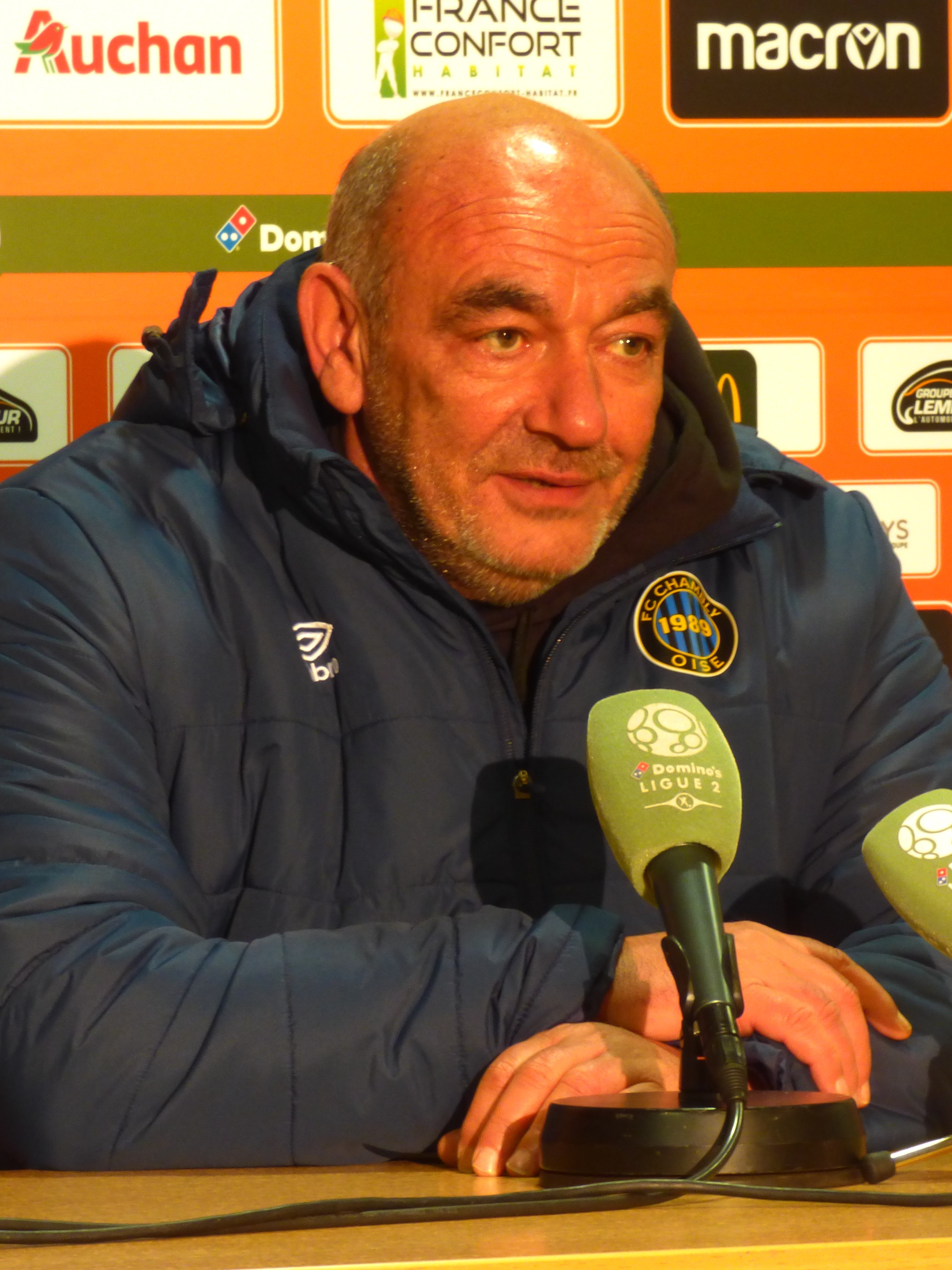
- Luzi with Chambly in 2019

Personal information
- Date of birth: 30 May 1965 (age 61)
- Place of birth: Mandres-les-Roses, France
- Position: Forward

Senior career*
Years	Team	Apps	(Gls)
1979–1982	Chantilly		
1982–1983	Dunkerque		
1984–1985	AS Creil		
1989–2001	Chambly		

Managerial career
- 2001–2022: Chambly
- 2022–2023: AFC Compiegne
- 2024: AS Villiers Houlgate
- * Club domestic league appearances and goals

Bruno Luzi (born 30 May 1965) is a French professional football manager and former player who played as a forward. He is heavily associated with Chambly, a club founded and run by his family, having seen five promotions with them as a player, and four as a manager in 30 years at the club.

== Managerial career ==
Luzi joined his family-run club FC Chambly as a footballer in 1989, the year it was founded. He became the manager in 2001, taking over the reins from his brother. In 2019, Luzi helped Chambly get promoted into the French Ligue 2. On 1 May 2020, he resigned from his post, stating it was time for the club to look at something else. On 7 May 2020, he reversed his decision, stating he would stay due to the expressions of support from staff, players and supporters. The club was relegated back to Championnat National at the end of the 2020–21 season.

Luzi was dismissed from his post by the club on 2 April 2022, after 3 draws and 6 losses in the previous 9 games, and last place in the Championnat National table. He served 21 years as the head coach.

== Personal life ==
Luzi was born in France and is of Italian descent. His father, Walter Luzi, was the founder of FC Chambly and president for nine years. His brother, Fulvio Luzi, was the manager of the club when Luzi was playing at the club, and has served as the president since 2001.
