= 2023–24 FC Lorient season =

FC Lorient
2023–24 season
- President: Loïc Fery
- Head coach: Régis Le Bris
- Stadium: Stade du Moustoir
- Ligue 1: 17th (relegated)
- Coupe de France: Round of 64
- Top goalscorer: League: Mohamed Bamba (8); All: Mohamed Bamba (8)
- Average home league attendance: 15,676
Home colours	Away colours	Third colours

The 2023–24 season was Football Club Lorient's 98th season in existence and fourth consecutive season in Ligue 1. They also competed in the Coupe de France.

== Players ==
=== First-team squad ===
As of 4 September 2023.

Note: Flags indicate national team as defined under FIFA eligibility rules; some limited exceptions apply. Players may hold more than one non-FIFA nationality.

No.	Pos.	Nation	Player
1	GK	SEN	Alfred Gomis (on loan from Rennes)
2	DF	BRA	Igor Silva
3	DF	TUN	Montassar Talbi
4	DF	FRA	Loris Mouyokolo
5	DF	FRA	Benjamin Mendy
8	MF	NGR	Bonke Innocent
10	MF	FRA	Romain Faivre (on loan from Bournemouth)
11	FW	SEN	Bamba Dieng
12	DF	CMR	Darlin Yongwa
13	DF	SEN	Formose Mendy
14	MF	FRA	Tiémoué Bakayoko
15	DF	FRA	Julien Laporte
17	MF	FRA	Jean-Victor Makengo
19	MF	FRA	Laurent Abergel (captain)
20	DF	GUI	Dembo Sylla
21	MF	FRA	Julien Ponceau

No.	Pos.	Nation	Player
22	FW	FRA	Eli Junior Kroupi
24	DF	COD	Gédéon Kalulu
25	DF	FRA	Vincent Le Goff
26	FW	FRA	Pablo Pagis
27	FW	BEN	Tosin Aiyegun
29	FW	FRA	Siriné Doucouré
33	FW	SEN	Bassirou N'Diaye
37	MF	FRA	Théo Le Bris
38	GK	SUI	Yvon Mvogo
44	MF	FRA	Ayman Kari (on loan from Paris SG)
77	FW	AUT	Adrian Grbić
93	MF	NOR	Joel Mvuka
94	GK	CAF	Dominique Youfeigane
95	DF	FRA	Isaak Touré
97	MF	FRA	Quentin Boisgard

=== Out on loan ===
Note: Flags indicate national team as defined under FIFA eligibility rules; some limited exceptions apply. Players may hold more than one non-FIFA nationality.

No.	Pos.	Nation	Player
—	DF	CIV	Bamo Meïté (at Marseille until 30 June 2024)
—	MF	CIV	Stéphane Diarra (at Saint-Étienne until 30 June 2024)
—	FW	FRA	Yoann Cathline (at Almere City until 30 June 2024)

No.	Pos.	Nation	Player
—	FW	NGR	Taofeek Ismaheel (at Beveren until 30 June 2024)
—	FW	SEN	Sambou Soumano (at Quevilly-Rouen until 30 June 2024)

== Transfers ==
=== In ===
Pos.	Player	Transferred from	Fee	Date	Source
MF	(France) Romain Faivre	(England) Bournemouth	Loan	13 July 2023	
DF	(Guinea) Dembo Sylla	(France) Laval	€1,000,000	17 July 2023	
DF	(France) Benjamin Mendy	Unattached	Free	19 July 2023	
DF	(Senegal) Formose Mendy	(France) Amiens	€7,500,000	20 July 2023	
FW	(Benin) Tosin Aiyegun	(Switzerland) Zürich	€4,000,000	25 July 2023	
DF	(France) Isaak Touré	(France) Marseille	€8,000,000	1 September 2023	
MF	(Greece) Panos Katseris	(Italy) Catanzaro	€1,500,000	23 January 2024	

=== Out ===
Pos.	Player	Transferred to	Fee	Date	Source
FW	(Nigeria) Terem Moffi	(France) Nice	€22,500,000	1 July 2023	
MF	(France) Enzo Le Fée	(France) Rennes	€20,000,000	7 July 2023	
FW	(Mali) Ibrahima Koné	(Spain) Almería	€7,500,000	16 August 2023	
MF	(France) Yoann Cathline	(Netherlands) Almere City	Loan	21 August 2023	
FW	(Mali) Siriné Doucouré	(France) Valenciennes	Loan	1 February 2024	
FW	(Austria) Adrian Grbić	(Switzerland) Luzern	Loan	5 February 2024	

== Pre-season and friendlies ==
Win Draw Loss Fixtures

22 July 2023 Friendly	Guingamp	2–2	Lorient	Guingamp
17:00 CEST (UTC+2)	Siwe 105'; Luvambo 115'; Merghem (penalty missed) 120'		Le Bris 25'; Kroupi 84'	Stadium: Pro Park
Note: Match was played in four periods of 30 minutes each.

29 July 2023 Friendly	Lorient	2–0	Le Havre	Dinan
17:00 CEST (UTC+2)	Laporte 55'; Koné 90+2'			Stadium: Stade du Clos Gastel

2 August 2023 Friendly	Lorient	3–1	Nantes	Vannes
18:30 CEST (UTC+2)	Dieng 9'; Pagis 49'; Yongwa 52'		Zézé 61'	Stadium: Stade de la Rabine

5 August 2023 Friendly	Bournemouth	2–0	Lorient	Bournemouth, England
17:00 BST (UTC+1)	Brooks 38'; Moore 85'			Stadium: Dean Court

== Competitions ==
=== Overall record ===
Competition	First match	Last match	Starting round	Final position	Record							
Competition	First match	Last match	Starting round	Final position	Pld	W	D	L	GF	GA	GD	Win %
Ligue 1	12 August 2023	19 May 2024	Matchday 1	17th	34	7	8	19	43	66	−23	20.59
Coupe de France	6 January 2024		Round of 64	Round of 64	1	0	0	1	1	2	−1	0.00
Total					35	7	8	20	44	68	−24	20.00

Source: Soccerway

=== Ligue 1 ===
==== League table ====
Pos	Team	Pld	W	D	L	GF	GA	GD	Pts	Qualification or relegation
14	Nantes	34	9	6	19	30	55	−25	33	
15	Le Havre	34	7	11	16	34	45	−11	32	
16	Metz (R)	34	8	5	21	35	58	−23	29 (Note: Metz finished ahead of Lorient on head-to-head away goals scored: Lorient 2–3 Metz, Metz 1–2 Lorient.)	Qualification for the Relegation play-offs
17	Lorient (R)	34	7	8	19	43	66	−23	29	Relegation to Ligue 2
18	Clermont (R)	34	5	10	19	26	60	−34	25	Relegation to Ligue 2

Source: Ligue 1
Rules for classification: 1) Points; 2) Goal difference; 3) Head-to-head points; 4) Head-to-head goal difference; 5) Head-to-head goals scored; 6) Head-to-head away goals scored; 7) Goals scored; 8) Away goals scored; 9) Fair-play points (Note: Head-to-head record is used only after all the matches between the teams in question have been played).
(R) Relegated

==== Results summary ====
Overall								Home						Away					
Pld	W	D	L	GF	GA	GD	Pts	W	D	L	GF	GA	GD	W	D	L	GF	GA	GD
34	7	8	19	43	66	−23	29	4	4	9	26	30	−4	3	4	10	17	36	−19

Source: Ligue 1

==== Results by round ====
Round	1	2	3	4	5	6	7	8	9	10	11	12	13	14	15	16	17	18	19	20	21	22	23	24	25	26	27	28	29	30	31	32	33	34
Ground	A	H	H	A	H	A	H	A	H	A	H	A	H	A	H	H	A	A	H	A	H	A	H	A	H	A	H	A	H	A	H	A	A	H
Result	D	D	W	L	D	L	L	D	W	L	D	L	L	D	L	L	L	L	D	W	W	W	L	W	L	D	L	L	L	L	L	L	L	W
Position	7	13	7	11	12	14	16	16	12	15	15	16	16	16	16	17	17	18	18	17	16	15	16	13	15	15	16	16	16	17	17	17	17	17

Source: Ligue 1
A = Away; H = Home; W = Win; D = Draw; L = Loss

==== Matches ====
The league fixtures were unveiled on 29 June 2023.

12 August 2023 1	Paris Saint-Germain	0–0	Lorient	Paris
21:00 CEST (UTC+2)		Report		Stadium: Parc des Princes; Attendance: 47,579; Referee: Benoît Bastien

20 August 2023 2	Lorient	1–1	Nice	Lorient
15:00 CEST (UTC+2)	Laporte (yellow card) 53'; Doucouré 77'	Report	Sanson (yellow card) 52'; Guessand 64'	Stadium: Stade du Moustoir; Attendance: 15,848; Referee: Hakim Ben El Hadj

27 August 2023 3	Lorient	4–1	Lille	Lorient
17:05 CEST (UTC+2)	Abergel 9'; Ponceau 10'; Pagis (yellow card) 49'; Doucouré (yellow card) 57'; Faivre 62'; Le Goff 67'	Report	Yoro (yellow card) 15'; Diakité (yellow card) 27'; André (yellow card) 51'; David 55'; Yazıcı (yellow card) 87'	Stadium: Stade du Moustoir; Attendance: 15,101; Referee: Willy Delajod

3 September 2023 4	Le Havre	3–0	Lorient	Le Havre
15:00 CEST (UTC+2)	Kuzyayev 52'; Alioui 70'; Mbemba 90+6'	Report		Stadium: Stade Océane; Attendance: 18,707; Referee: Romain Lissorgue

17 September 2023 5	Lorient	2–2	Monaco	Lorient
13:00 CEST (UTC+2)	Aiyegun 2'; Faivre 90+8'	Report	Golovin 17', (yellow card) 90+8'; Zakaria (yellow card) 68'; Balogun 69'	Stadium: Stade du Moustoir; Attendance: 15,247; Referee: Marc Bollengier

23 September 2023 6	Nantes	5–3	Lorient	Nantes
17:00 CEST (UTC+2)	Abline 42'; Cömert 46'; Mohamed 55'; Descamps (yellow card) 81'; Mollet 83'; Simon 90+9' (pen.)	Report	Kroupi 6'; Abergel (yellow card) 53'; Faivre 75', (yellow card) 90+1'; Aiyegun 85'; Igor Silva (yellow card) 90+7'	Stadium: Stade de la Beaujoire; Attendance: 30,704; Referee: Florent Batta

1 October 2023 7	Lorient	0–3	Montpellier	Lorient
17:05 CEST (UTC+2)	Ponceau (yellow card) 20'; Talbi (yellow card) 33'	Report	Adams 30', 89'; Estève (yellow card) 61'; Savanier 73' (pen.)	Stadium: Stade du Moustoir; Attendance: 13,492; Referee: Jérémy Stinat

8 October 2023 8	Lyon	3–3	Lorient	Décines-Charpieu
15:00 CEST (UTC+2)	Nuamah 21'; Lacazette 22', 41' (pen.)	Report	Kroupi 16', 54'; Yongwa 79'	Stadium: Parc Olympique Lyonnais; Attendance: 43,100; Referee: Clément Turpin

22 October 2023 9	Lorient	2–1	Rennes	Lorient
13:00 CEST (UTC+2)	Omari 3' (o.g.); Touré 45+2'	Report	Blas 21'; Wooh (yellow card) 48'; Salah (yellow card) 90+2'	Stadium: Stade du Moustoir; Attendance: 16,711; Referee: Gaël Angoula

28 October 2023 10	Reims	1–0	Lorient	Reims
17:00 CEST (UTC+2)	Teuma (yellow card) 37'; Wilson-Esbrand 84'	Report	Yongwa (yellow card) 61'; Bakayoko (yellow card) 65'; Mvogo (yellow card) 80'	Stadium: Stade Auguste-Delaune; Attendance: 14,033; Referee: Benoît Bastien

4 November 2023 11	Lorient	0–0	Lens	Lorient
17:00 CET (UTC+1)	Mvuka (yellow card) 40'; Touré (yellow card) 90+4'	Report	Danso (yellow card) 48'; Samba (yellow card) 90+4'; Fulgini (yellow card) 90+4'	Stadium: Stade du Moustoir; Attendance: 16,599; Referee: Bastien Dechepy

12 November 2023 12	Clermont	1–0	Lorient	Clermont-Ferrand
15:00 CET (UTC+1)	Konaté (yellow card) 10'; Cham (yellow card) 47'; Nicholson 69' (pen.); Seidu (yellow card) 85'	Report	Touré (yellow card) 52'; F. Mendy (yellow card) 57'	Stadium: Stade Gabriel-Montpied; Attendance: 9,798; Referee: Romain Lissorgue

26 November 2023 13	Lorient	2–3	Metz	Lorient
15:00 CET (UTC+1)	Faivre 8'; Kroupi 22'; Yongwa (yellow card) 48'; Doucouré (yellow card) 56'	Report	Sabaly 1'; Udol (yellow card) 45'; Traoré 65'; Jallow 83' (pen.)	Stadium: Stade du Moustoir; Attendance: 14,469; Referee: Jérémie Pignard

3 December 2023 14	Toulouse	1–1	Lorient	Toulouse
15:00 CET (UTC+1)	Dønnum (yellow card) 1'; Dallinga 72'; Sierro (yellow card) 83'	Report	Bakayoko (yellow card) 9'; Talbi (yellow card) 33'; Ponceau (yellow card) 71'; B. Mendy (yellow card) 83'; Dieng 90+1'	Stadium: Stadium de Toulouse; Attendance: 22,799; Referee: Thomas Léonard

10 December 2023 15	Lorient	2–4	Marseille	Lorient
20:45 CET (UTC+1)	Le Goff (yellow card) 14'; B. Mendy (yellow card) 16', (goal) 52'; Faivre 41'; Laporte (yellow card) 45+3'; Innocent (yellow card) 62'; F. Mendy (yellow card) 71'	Report	Mbemba 3'; Aubameyang 9', 42'; Balerdi (yellow card) 21', (goal) 33'; Lodi (yellow card) 57'; Gigot (yellow card) 59'; Clauss (red card) 80'	Stadium: Stade du Moustoir; Attendance: 15,848; Referee: Eric Wattellier

17 December 2023 16	Lorient	1–2	Strasbourg	Lorient
15:00 CET (UTC+1)	Dieng (yellow card) 32', (goal) 53'; B. Mendy (yellow card) 71'; Touré (yellow card) 90+2'	Report	Bakwa 14'; Gameiro 49'; Perrin (yellow card) 66'; Sels (yellow card) 71'	Stadium: Stade du Moustoir; Attendance: 14,580; Referee: Bastien Dechepy

20 December 2023 17	Brest	4–0	Lorient	Brest
21:00 CET (UTC+1)	Doumbia 22', 25', 29', 45+3'; Brassier (yellow card) 87'	Report	Kroupi (yellow card) 70'; Igor Silva (yellow card) 86'	Stadium: Stade Francis-Le Blé; Attendance: 14,544; Referee: Mathieu Vernice

14 January 2024 18	Lille	3–0	Lorient	Villeneuve-d'Ascq
13:00 CET (UTC+1)	David 38'; André (yellow card) 40'; Cabella 90'; Zhegrova 90+2'	Report	Le Bris (yellow card) 30'; Bakayoko (yellow card) 41'; Pelon (yellow card) 55'; Touré (yellow card) 88'	Stadium: Stade Pierre-Mauroy; Attendance: 35,204; Referee: Pierre Gaillouste

28 January 2024 19	Lorient	3–3	Le Havre	Lorient
15:00 CET (UTC+1)	Katseris (yellow card) 17'; Louza 33', (yellow card) 45'; Le Bris (yellow card) 36'; Ponceau (yellow card) 42'; Kari 51'; Bamba 90+2'	Report	Sabbi 15' (pen.), (yellow card) 43'; Kinkoue (yellow card) 25'; Kechta (yellow card) 48'; Opéri (yellow card) 73'; Ayew 85', 90+4'	Stadium: Stade du Moustoir; Attendance: 15,207; Referee: Jérémy Stinat

4 February 2024 20	Metz	1–2	Lorient	Metz
15:00 CET (UTC+1)	N'Doram (yellow card) 19'; Lamkel Zé 22'; Jean Jacques (yellow card) 77'; Colin (yellow card) 87'	Report	Bamba 19'; Katseris 58'; F. Mendy (yellow card) 90+3'	Stadium: Stade Saint-Symphorien; Attendance: 21,044; Referee: Romain Lissorgue

11 February 2024 21	Lorient	2–0	Reims	Lorient
15:00 CET (UTC+1)	Abergel (yellow card) 31'; Bamba 70'; Bakayoko 87'	Report	Stambouli (yellow card) 41'	Stadium: Stade du Moustoir; Attendance: 15,096; Referee: Marc Bollengier

18 February 2024 22	Strasbourg	1–3	Lorient	Strasbourg
13:00 CET (UTC+1)	Diarra (yellow card) 26'; Guilbert 51'; Mwanga (yellow card) 67'; Ângelo (yellow card) 86'; Bakwa (red card) 90+4'	Report	Bamba 2', 45+3'; Ponceau 49'; Touré (yellow card) 86'	Stadium: Stade de la Meinau; Attendance: 25,103; Referee: Thomas Léonard

24 February 2024 23	Lorient	0–1	Nantes	Lorient
17:00 CET (UTC+1)		Report	Castelletto 49'; Douglas Augusto (yellow card) 67'; Pallois (yellow card) 69'	Stadium: Stade du Moustoir; Attendance: 16,783; Referee: Willy Delajod

3 March 2024 24	Rennes	1–2	Lorient	Rennes
17:05 CET (UTC+1)	Blas (yellow card) 74'; Gouiri 90+4'	Report	Touré (yellow card) 56'; Bamba 59'; Abergel (yellow card) 72'; Kroupi 90'	Stadium: Roazhon Park; Attendance: 28,615; Referee: Benoît Bastien

9 March 2024 25	Lorient	0–2	Lyon	Lorient
17:00 CET (UTC+1)		Report	Tagliafico 52'; Baldé 64'	Stadium: Stade du Moustoir; Attendance: 16,426; Referee: Mathieu Vernice

17 March 2024 26	Monaco	2–2	Lorient	Monaco
15:00 CET (UTC+1)	F. Mendy 27' (o.g.); Minamino (yellow card) 54'; Fofana 60'; Zakaria (yellow card) 62' (yellow-red card) 81'	Report	Singo 1' (o.g.); F. Mendy (yellow card) 71'; Aiyegun (red card) 90'; Bakayoko 90+5'	Stadium: Stade Louis II; Attendance: 5,090; Referee: Bastien Dechepy

31 March 2024 27	Lorient	0–1	Brest	Lorient
13:00 CEST (UTC+2)	Dieng (yellow card) 80'	Report	Lala (yellow card) 45+1'; Martin (yellow card) 76'; Brassier (yellow card) 80'; Del Castillo 86'; Brahimi (red card) 90+5'	Stadium: Stade du Moustoir; Attendance: 16,745; Referee: Jérôme Brisard

7 April 2024 28	Montpellier	2–0	Lorient	Montpellier
15:00 CEST (UTC+2)	Ferri (yellow card) 14'; Savanier (yellow card) 42', (goal) 55' (pen.); Khazri (yellow card) 61'; Karamoh 90'	Report	Yongwa (yellow card) 44'; F. Mendy (yellow card) 45+1'; Adjei (yellow card) 52'; Ponceau (yellow card) 58'; Bamba (yellow card) 59'; Katseris (yellow card) 90+5'	Stadium: Stade de la Mosson; Attendance: 15,234; Referee: Romain Lissorgue

19 April 2024 30	Nice	3–0	Lorient	Nice
21:00 CEST (UTC+2)	Sanson 22'; Boga 53'; Guessand 90'	Report	Bamba (yellow card) 5'; Kari (yellow card) 57'	Stadium: Allianz Riviera; Attendance: 21,067; Referee: Jérémy Stinat

24 April 2024 29	Lorient	1–4	Paris Saint-Germain	Lorient
19:00 CEST (UTC+2)	Bakayoko (yellow card) 63'; Bamba 73'	Report	Dembélé 19', 60'; K. Mbappé 22', 90'; Mendes (yellow card) 26'	Stadium: Stade du Moustoir; Attendance: 16,738; Referee: Marc Bollengier
Note: The match was originally scheduled for 14 April 2024, but was postponed due to Paris Saint-Germain's progression in the UEFA Champions League.

28 April 2024 31	Lorient	1–2	Toulouse	Lorient
15:00 CEST (UTC+2)	Ponceau 20'; Adjei (yellow card) 31'	Report	Diarra (yellow card) 38'; Aboukhlal (yellow card) 51'; Dallinga 59'; Cissoko 83'; Sierro (yellow card) 87'	Stadium: Stade du Moustoir; Attendance: 16,125; Referee: Gaël Angoula

3 May 2024 32	Lens	2–0	Lorient	Lens
21:00 CEST (UTC+2)	Wahi 57', (yellow card) 58'; Costa 81'	Report	Bakayoko (yellow card) 20'; Katseris (yellow card) 71'	Stadium: Stade Bollaert-Delelis; Attendance: 37,569; Referee: Jérémie Pignard

12 May 2024 33	Marseille	3–1	Lorient	Marseille
21:00 CEST (UTC+2)	Aubameyang 36', 54' (pen.), (yellow card) 49'; Gigot 41'; Gueye (yellow card) 73'; Murillo (yellow card) 90+5'	Report	Laporte (yellow card) 17'; B. Mendy 43'; Katseris (yellow card) 51'; Bamba (yellow card) 61'; Abergel (yellow card) 90+2'	Stadium: Stade Vélodrome; Attendance: 62,082; Referee: Bastien Dechepy

19 May 2024 34	Lorient	5–0	Clermont	Lorient
21:00 CEST (UTC+2)	Laporte (yellow card) 20'; Abergel 38'; Bamba 42' (pen.); Bouanani 54'; Dieng 63', 90', (yellow card) 69'; Ponceau (yellow card) 72'	Report	Magnin (yellow card) 12'; Allevinah (yellow card) 73'; Diaw (yellow card) 90+4'	Stadium: Stade du Moustoir; Attendance: 16,176; Referee: Clément Turpin

=== Coupe de France ===
6 January 2024 Round of 64	Sochaux	2–1	Lorient	Montbéliard
18:00 CET (UTC+1)	Michel (yellow card) 34'; Dacosta (yellow card) 46'; Daho 70'; Macalou 90+3' (pen.)	Report	Makengo (yellow card) 26'; Pelon 34', (yellow card) 75'; Sylla (yellow card) 57'	Stadium: Stade Auguste-Bonal; Attendance: 12,947; Referee: Willy Delajod
