= 2022–23 FC Lorient season =

FC Lorient
2022–23 season
- Owner: Loïc Fery
- President: Loïc Fery
- Head coach: Régis Le Bris
- Stadium: Stade du Moustoir
- Ligue 1: 10th
- Coupe de France: Round of 16
- Top goalscorer: League: Terem Moffi (12); All: Terem Moffi (12)
Home colours	Away colours	Third colours

The 2022–23 season was the 97th season in the history of FC Lorient and their third consecutive season in the top flight. The club participated in Ligue 1 and the Coupe de France. The season covers the period from 1 July 2022 to 30 June 2023.

== Players ==
=== First-team squad ===
As of 20 February 2023

Note: Flags indicate national team as defined under FIFA eligibility rules; some limited exceptions apply. Players may hold more than one non-FIFA nationality.

No.	Pos.	Nation	Player
1	GK	ITA	Vito Mannone
2	DF	BRA	Igor Silva
3	DF	TUN	Montassar Talbi
7	FW	CIV	Stéphane Diarra
8	MF	NGR	Bonke Innocent
9	FW	MLI	Ibrahima Koné
10	MF	FRA	Adil Aouchiche
11	FW	SEN	Bamba Dieng
12	DF	CMR	Darlin Yongwa
14	MF	FRA	Romain Faivre (on loan from Lyon)
15	DF	FRA	Julien Laporte
17	MF	FRA	Jean-Victor Makengo
18	MF	CIV	Bamo Meïté

No.	Pos.	Nation	Player
19	MF	FRA	Laurent Abergel (captain)
21	DF	FRA	Julien Ponceau
22	FW	FRA	Yoann Cathline
23	GK	GER	Julian Pollersbeck (on loan from Lyon)
24	DF	COD	Gédéon Kalulu
25	DF	FRA	Vincent Le Goff
29	FW	FRA	Siriné Doucouré
37	DF	FRA	Théo Le Bris
38	GK	SUI	Yvon Mvogo
44	FW	FRA	Ayman Kari (on loan from Paris Saint-Germain)
77	GK	FRA	Teddy Bartouche
80	MF	FRA	Enzo Le Fée

== Pre-season and friendlies ==
Win Draw Loss Fixtures

9 July 2022 Friendly	Lorient	1–0	Concarneau	Ploemeur
11:00 CEST (UTC+2)	Ouattara 69'			Stadium: Complexe Sportif Espace FCL

16 July 2022 Friendly	Brest	1–0	Lorient	Dinan
17:30 CEST (UTC+2)	Dembélé 90'			Stadium: Stade du Clos Gastel

23 July 2022 Friendly	Nantes	2–0	Lorient	La Baule-Escoublac
16:00 CEST (UTC+2)	Doucet 15'; Blas 75'			Stadium: Stade Moreau Défarges

27 July 2022 Friendly	Lorient	2–1	Châteauroux	Inzinzac-Lochrist
19:00 CEST (UTC+2)	Grbić 84', 89' (pen.)		Ntolla 25'	Stadium: Stade de Mané-Braz

30 July 2022 Friendly	Lorient	1–1	Ajaccio	Lorient
17:00 CEST (UTC+2)	Laporte 24'		Alphonse 36'	Stadium: Stade du Moustoir

10 December 2022 Friendly	Osasuna	1–1	Lorient	Pamplona
13:00 CET (UTC+1)	Torró (yellow card) 5'; Aridane (yellow card) 45'; R. García 85'		Diarra 39'

16 December 2022 Friendly	Guingamp	1–0	Lorient	Guingamp
--:-- CET (UTC+1)

21 December 2022 Friendly	Lorient	2–1	Nantes	Vannes
18:00 CET (UTC+1)				Stadium: Stade de la Rabine

== Competitions ==
=== Overall record ===
Competition	First match	Last match	Starting round	Final position	Record							
Competition	First match	Last match	Starting round	Final position	Pld	W	D	L	GF	GA	GD	Win %
Ligue 1	7 August 2022	3 June 2023	Matchday 1	10th	38	15	10	13	52	53	−1	39.47
Coupe de France	8 January 2023	9 February 2023	Round of 64	Round of 16	3	1	2	0	8	2	+6	33.33
Total					41	16	12	13	60	55	+5	39.02

Source: Soccerway

=== Ligue 1 ===
==== League table ====
Pos	Team	Pld	W	D	L	GF	GA	GD	Pts
8	Clermont	38	17	8	13	45	49	−4	59
9	Nice	38	15	13	10	48	37	+11	58
10	Lorient	38	15	10	13	52	53	−1	55
11	Reims	38	12	15	11	45	45	0	51
12	Montpellier	38	15	5	18	65	62	+3	50

Source: Ligue 1
Rules for classification: 1) Points; 2) Goal difference; 3) Head-to-head points; 4) Head-to-head goal difference; 5) Head-to-head goals scored; 6) Head-to-head away goals scored; 7) Goals scored; 8) Away goals scored; 9) Fair-play points (Note: Head-to-head record is used only after all the matches between the teams in question have been played).

==== Results summary ====
Overall								Home						Away					
Pld	W	D	L	GF	GA	GD	Pts	W	D	L	GF	GA	GD	W	D	L	GF	GA	GD
38	15	10	13	52	53	−1	55	9	4	6	26	21	+5	6	6	7	26	32	−6

Source: Ligue 1

==== Results by round ====
Round	1	2	3	4	5	6	7	8	9	10	11	12	13	14	15	16	17	18	19	20	21	22	23	24	25	26	27	28	29	30	31	32	33	34	35	36	37	38
Ground	A	H	A	H	A	A	H	A	H	A	H	A	H	H	A	H	A	H	A	H	A	H	A	H	H	A	H	A	A	H	A	H	A	H	A	H	A	H
Result	W	W	D	W	L	W	W	W	W	W	D	D	L	L	D	L	W	D	L	W	L	D	L	W	L	D	W	D	L	D	L	L	W	W	D	L	L	W
Position	8	8	8	5	7	5	4	3	3	2	2	3	4	6	5	7	6	6	7	6	7	7	8	7	8	9	9	8	10	10	10	11	10	9	9	10	10	10

Source: Ligue 1
A = Away; H = Home; W = Win; D = Draw; L = Loss

==== Matches ====
The league fixtures were announced on 17 June 2022.

7 August 2022 1	Rennes	0–1	Lorient	Rennes
17:05 CEST (UTC+2)	Truffert (yellow card) 62'; Theate (yellow card) 87'; Traoré (yellow card) 87'	Report	Theate 65' (o.g.); Le Goff (yellow card) 75'	Stadium: Roazhon Park; Attendance: 28,177; Referee: Bastien Dechepy

21 August 2022 3	Toulouse	2–2	Lorient	Toulouse
15:00 CEST (UTC+2)	Ratão 31'; Dallinga (yellow card) 43', (goal) 64'; Van den Boomen (yellow card) 72'	Report	Laurienté 2'; Le Fée (yellow card) 22'; Koné 80' (pen.)	Stadium: Stadium de Toulouse; Attendance: 23,862; Referee: Gustavo Correia

28 August 2022 4	Lorient	2–1	Clermont	Lorient
15:00 CEST (UTC+2)	Kalulu (yellow card) 15'; Moffi 24' (pen.), 41'	Report	Neto (yellow card) 22' (yellow-red card) 48'; Gonalons (yellow card) 39'; Cham 62'	Stadium: Stade du Moustoir; Attendance: 10,591; Referee: Willy Delajod

31 August 2022 5	Lens	5–2	Lorient	Lens
21:00 CEST (UTC+2)	Sotoca 24', 77'; Saïd 28'; Abdul Samed 57'; Gradit (yellow card) 63'; Openda 86'	Report	Moffi 41', 50', (yellow card) 63'; Ouattara (yellow card) 58'; Abergel (yellow card) 60'	Stadium: Stade Bollaert-Delelis; Attendance: 37,161; Referee: Benoît Bastien

4 September 2022 6	Ajaccio	0–1	Lorient	Ajaccio
15:00 CEST (UTC+2)	Nouri (yellow card) 38'; Gonzalez (yellow card) 47'; El Idrissy (yellow card) 68'; Youssouf (yellow card) 90+4'	Report	Koné (yellow card) 35'; Ouattara 51'	Stadium: Stade François Coty; Attendance: 7,000; Referee: Jérémy Stinat

7 September 2022 2	Lorient	3–1	Lyon	Lorient
19:00 CEST (UTC+2)	Le Fée 6'; Moffi 33'; Diarra (yellow card) 43'; Ouattara 49'	Report	Mendes (yellow card) 23'; Lacazette 28'; Da Silva (yellow card) 55'; Dembélé (yellow card) 84'	Stadium: Stade du Moustoir; Attendance: 13,685; Referee: Bastien Depechy
Note: The match was originally scheduled for 14 August 2022 at 13:00, but was postponed for safety reasons due to the poor condition of Lorient's pitch.

11 September 2022 7	Lorient	3–2	Nantes	Lorient
15:00 CEST (UTC+2)	Ouattara 19'; Cathline 60'; Koné 74', (yellow card) 78'; Laporte (yellow card) 76'	Report	Ganago 13'; Simon (yellow card) 40', (goal) 85'; Chirivella (yellow card) 45'; Appiah (yellow card) 56'	Stadium: Stade du Moustoir; Attendance: 15,080; Referee: Johan Hamel

16 September 2022 8	Auxerre	1–3	Lorient	Auxerre
21:00 CEST (UTC+2)	Mensah (yellow card) 40'; Hein 50'; Touré (yellow card) 75'; Dugimont (yellow card) 83'	Report	Ouattara 15'; Moffi 37'; Le Fée 42'; Kalulu (yellow card) 59'	Stadium: Stade de l'Abbé-Deschamps; Attendance: 14,866; Referee: Ruddy Buquet

2 October 2022 9	Lorient	2–1	Lille	Lorient
13:00 CEST (UTC+2)	Diakité 9' (o.g.); Ouattara (yellow card) 33' (yellow-red card) 62'; Abergel (yellow card) 42'; Le Bris 87'	Report	Ang. Gomes (yellow card) 25'; Martin (yellow card) 45'; Diakité (yellow card) 49'; David 78'	Stadium: Stade du Moustoir; Attendance: 14,916; Referee: Hakim Ben El Hadj

9 October 2022 10	Brest	1–2	Lorient	Brest
15:00 CEST (UTC+2)	Del Castillo 17', (yellow card) 63'; Slimani (yellow card) 21'; Honorat (yellow card) 66'	Report	Moffi 24', 53'; Boisgard (yellow card) 68'	Stadium: Stade Francis-Le Blé; Attendance: 9,819; Referee: Bastien Dechepy

15 October 2022 11	Lorient	0–0	Reims	Lorient
17:00 CEST (UTC+2)	Ponceau (yellow card) 22'	Report	Agbadou (yellow card) 13' (red card) 90+1'; Lopy (yellow card) 45+2' (yellow-red card) 46'	Stadium: Stade du Moustoir; Attendance: 15,776; Referee: Mathieu Vernice

23 October 2022 12	Troyes	2–2	Lorient	Troyes
15:00 CEST (UTC+2)	Porozo (yellow card) 27'; Laporte 34' (o.g.); Lopes 61'; Lis (yellow card) 65'	Report	Diarra 50'; Boisgard 81'	Stadium: Stade de l'Aube; Attendance: 7,975; Referee: Marc Bollengier

30 October 2022 13	Lorient	1–2	Nice	Lorient
17:05 CET (UTC+1)	Ouattara 18'	Report	Lemina (yellow card) 58'; Atal 61'; Laborde 69'	Stadium: Stade du Moustoir; Attendance: 16,034; Referee: Clément Turpin

6 November 2022 14	Lorient	1–2	Paris Saint Germain	Lorient
13:00 CET (UTC+1)	Moffi 53'; Innocent (yellow card) 63'	Report	Neymar 9'; Pereira 81'	Stadium: Stade du Moustoir; Attendance: 16,778; Referee: Benoît Bastien

13 November 2022 15	Strasbourg	1–1	Lorient	Strasbourg
17:05 CET (UTC+1)	Aholou (yellow card) 22'; Thomasson (yellow card) 42'; Bellegarde (yellow card) 85'; Diallo 87'; Liénard (yellow card) 89'	Report	Moffi 5'; Innocent (yellow card) 26'	Stadium: Stade de la Meinau; Attendance: 25,117; Referee: Pierre Gaillouste

28 December 2022 16	Lorient	0–2	Montpellier	Lorient
17:00 CET (UTC+1)	Le Fée (yellow card) 7'; Kalulu (yellow card) 50'; Innocent (yellow card) 59'	Report	Savanier 3', (yellow card) 90'; Wahi 22'; Leroy (yellow card) 28'; Sacko (yellow card) 43'; Omlin (yellow card) 58'	Stadium: Stade du Moustoir; Attendance: 15,963; Referee: Willy Delajod

1 January 2023 17	Angers	1–2	Lorient	Angers
15:00 CET (UTC+1)	Capelle (yellow card) 4'; Sima 10'; Hountondji (yellow card) 52'	Report	Sima 79' (o.g.); Le Fée 88'	Stadium: Stade Raymond Kopa; Attendance: 6,000; Referee: Florent Batta

11 January 2023 18	Lorient	2–2	Monaco	Lorient
21:00 CET (UTC+1)	Innocent (yellow card) 42'; Ouattara 75'; Moffi 77'	Report	Caio Henrique (yellow card) 37'; Embolo 61'; Ben Yedder 90+3'	Stadium: Stade du Moustoir; Attendance: 14,521; Referee: Jérôme Brisard

14 January 2023 19	Marseille	3–1	Lorient	Marseille
19:00 CET (UTC+1)	Kolašinac 38'; Ünder (yellow card) 50'; Sánchez 53'; Veretout 59'	Report	Moffi 29'	Stadium: Stade Vélodrome; Attendance: 63,276; Referee: Bastien Dechepy

27 January 2023 20	Lorient	2–1	Rennes	Lorient
21:00 CET (UTC+1)	Talbi 13'; Le Bris 31'; Meïté (yellow card) 90+3'	Report	Theate (yellow card) 65'; Tait 72'	Stadium: Stade du Moustoir; Attendance: 16,782; Referee: Benoît Millot

1 February 2023 21	Reims	4–2	Lorient	Reims
19:00 CET (UTC+1)	Balogun 44' (pen.), 61', 64'; Doumbia 51'; Matusiwa (yellow card) 77'	Report	Le Fée 10'; Koné 35'	Stadium: Stade Auguste-Delaune; Attendance: 10,746; Referee: Florent Batta

5 February 2023 22	Lorient	0–0	Angers	Lorient
15:00 CET (UTC+1)	Le Fée (yellow card) 74'; Kalulu (yellow card) 88'	Report	Mendy (yellow card) 23'; Chetti (yellow card) 62'; Blažič (yellow card) 89'; Abdelli (yellow card) 90+2'	Stadium: Stade du Moustoir; Attendance: 12,705; Referee: Willy Delajod

12 February 2023 23	Nantes	1–0	Lorient	Nantes
17:05 CET (UTC+1)	Blas 66'	Report		Stadium: Stade de la Beaujoire; Attendance: 33,579; Referee: Mathieu Vernice

19 February 2023 24	Lorient	3–0	Ajaccio	Lorient
15:00 CET (UTC+1)	Dieng 6' (pen.); Faivre 43'; Ponceau 58'	Report	Youssouf (yellow card) 28'; Vidal (yellow card) 49'	Stadium: Stade du Moustoir; Attendance: 12,918; Referee: Eric Wattelier

26 February 2023 25	Lorient	0–1	Auxerre	Lorient
13:00 CET (UTC+1)	Meïté (yellow card) 56'; Abergel (yellow card) 77'	Report	Touré (yellow card) 32'; Raveloson 58'; Dembélé (yellow card) 67'; Massengo (yellow card) 77'	Stadium: Stade du Moustoir; Attendance: 13,089; Referee: Benoît Millot

5 March 2023 26	Lyon	0–0	Lorient	Décines-Charpieu
17:05 CET (UTC+1)	Lukeba (yellow card) 66'	Report		Stadium: Parc Olympique Lyonnais; Attendance: 38,568; Referee: Thomas Léonard

12 March 2023 27	Lorient	2–0	Troyes	Lorient
15:00 CET (UTC+1)	Dieng 8'; Diarra 90+2'	Report	Palmer-Brown (yellow card) 76'; Kouamé (yellow card) 79'	Stadium: Stade du Moustoir; Attendance: 6,889; Referee: Clément Turpin

19 March 2023 28	Nice	1–1	Lorient	Nice
15:00 CET (UTC+1)	Laborde 78'	Report	Meïté 30'; Mannone (yellow card) 74'; Silva (yellow card) 89', (red card) 90+2'	Stadium: Allianz Riviera; Attendance: 20,762; Referee: Ruddy Buquet

2 April 2023 29	Lille	3–1	Lorient	Villeneuve-d'Ascq
13:00 CEST (UTC+2)	Cabella 12'; And. Gomes (yellow card) 45'; Weah (yellow card) 50'; André (yellow card) 84'; Zhegrova 88', 90'	Report	Abergel (yellow card) 45'; Meïté (yellow card) 53' (yellow-red card) 78'; Koné 76'	Stadium: Stade Pierre-Mauroy; Attendance: 33,862; Referee: Jérémie Pignard

9 April 2023 30	Lorient	0–0	Marseille	Lorient
20:45 CEST (UTC+2)		Report	Malinovskyi (yellow card) 83'; Balerdi (yellow card) 86'	Stadium: Stade du Moustoir; Attendance: 16,767; Referee: Willy Delajod

16 April 2023 31	Monaco	3–1	Lorient	Monaco
17:05 CEST (UTC+2)	Diatta 14'; Golovin 27'; Volland 55'	Report	Silva (yellow card) 25'; Koné 86'	Stadium: Stade Louis II; Attendance: 6,930; Referee: Bastien Dechepy

23 April 2023 32	Lorient	0–1	Toulouse	Lorient
15:00 CEST (UTC+2)	Abergel (yellow card) 70'; Meïté (yellow card) 78'; Kalulu (yellow card) 82'	Report	Sierro (yellow card) 51'; Aboukhlal 68'; Spierings (yellow card) 90+1'	Stadium: Stade du Moustoir; Attendance: 15,948; Referee: Marc Bollengier

30 April 2023 33	Paris Saint-Germain	1–3	Lorient	Paris
17:05 CEST (UTC+2)	Hakimi (yellow card) 5' (yellow-red card) 20'; Mbappé 29'; Marquinhos (yellow card) 51'; Verratti (yellow card) 73'	Report	Le Fée 16', (yellow card) 52'; Innocent (yellow card) 32'; Yongwa 39'; Dieng (yellow card) 77', (goal) 88'	Stadium: Parc des Princes; Attendance: 41,454; Referee: Jérôme Brisard

7 May 2023 34	Lorient	2–1	Brest	Lorient
15:00 CEST (UTC+2)	Koné 32', 51'; Yongwa (yellow card) 83'; Makengo (yellow card) 89' (yellow-red card) 90+5'	Report	Duverne (yellow card) 42'; Lees-Melou (yellow card) 60'; Del Castillo 69' (pen.)	Stadium: Stade du Moustoir; Attendance: 16,338; Referee: Benoît Millot

14 May 2023 35	Montpellier	1–1	Lorient	Montpellier
15:00 CEST (UTC+2)	Ferri (yellow card) 33'; Kouyaté (yellow card) 89'; Maouassa 90+4'	Report	Meïté (yellow card) 25'; Koné (yellow card) 38'; Faivre 68'; Le Fée (yellow card) 90+1'	Stadium: Stade de la Mosson; Attendance: 12,595; Referee: Mathieu Vernice

21 May 2023 36	Lorient	1–3	Lens	Lorient
17:05 CEST (UTC+2)	Faivre 6'; Yongwa (yellow card) 71'; Kalulu (yellow card) 75'	Report	Sotoca 20'; Thomasson 25'; Machado (yellow card) 39'; Medina (yellow card) 43'; Fofana 87'	Stadium: Stade du Moustoir; Attendance: 16,724; Referee: Stéphanie Frappart

27 May 2023 37	Clermont	2–0	Lorient	Clermont-Ferrand
21:00 CEST (UTC+2)	Khaoui 44'; Caufriez 74'	Report	Koné (penalty missed) 43'	Stadium: Stade Gabriel Montpied; Attendance: 13,050; Referee: Florent Batta

3 June 2023 38	Lorient	2–1	Strasbourg	Lorient
21:00 CEST (UTC+2)	Faivre 10', 36'; Abergel (yellow card) 88'	Report	Bellegarde 56', (yellow card) 65'	Stadium: Stade du Moustoir; Attendance: 16,351; Referee: Bastien Dechepy

=== Coupe de France ===
8 January 2023 Round of 64	AS La Châtaigneraie	0–6	Lorient	La Roche-sur-Yon
15:30 CET (UTC+1)		Report	Koné 43' (pen.); Cathline 45+2', 61'; Aouchiche 51'; Diarra 54'; Grbić 77'	Stadium: Stade Henri Desgrange; Attendance: 5,000; Referee: Marc Bollengier

21 January 2023 Round of 32	Bastia	1–1 (a.e.t.) (1–4 p)	Lorient	Bastia
18:00 CET	Sainati 81', (yellow card) 86'; Bohnert (yellow card) 81'	Report	Koné 64', (yellow card) 65'	Stadium: Stade Armand-Cesari; Attendance: 7,518; Referee: Eric Wattellier
	Penalties
	Magri (penalty scored); Djoco (penalty missed); Kaïboué (penalty missed)		(penalty scored) Boisgard; (penalty scored) Yongwa; (penalty scored) Le Bris: (penalty scored) Abergel

9 February 2023 Round of 16	Lorient	1–1 (2–4 p)	Lens	Lorient
21:00 CET (UTC+1)	Le Fée 84'	Report	Fulgini 21'; Poręba (yellow card) 50'; Boura (yellow card) 60'; Onana (yellow card) 82'	Stadium: Stade du Moustoir; Attendance: 14,835; Referee: Jérémie Pignard
	Penalties
	Le Fée (penalty missed); Talbi (penalty scored); Doucouré (penalty scored); Koné (penalty missed)		(penalty scored) Frankowski; (penalty scored) Sotoca; (penalty scored) Thomasson; (penalty scored) Medina
