= Le Bris =

Le Bris, or Bris, is a surname, and may refer to:

- Gilbert Le Bris (1949–), French politician
- Jean Marie Le Bris (1817–1879), French sea captain and aviation pioneer
- Michel Le Bris (1944–2021)
- Pierre-Louis Le Bris (1929–2015), French actor known under the screen name Pierre Brice
- Régis Le Bris (born 1975), French football manager
- Théo Le Bris (born 2002), French footballer
