= Eli Junior Kroupi =

French footballer (born 2006)

Eli Kroupi
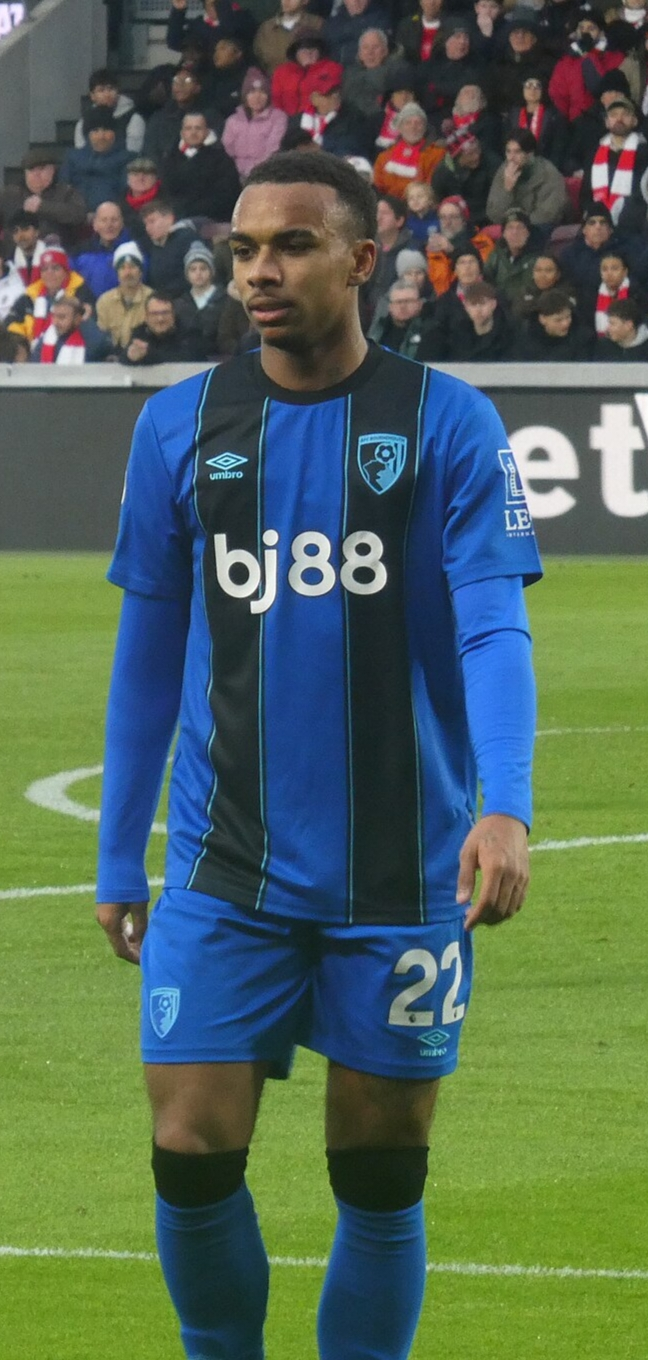
- Kroupi with Bournemouth in 2025

Personal information
- Full name: Eli Junior Éric Anatole Rainha Kroupi
- Date of birth: 23 June 2006 (age 20)
- Place of birth: Lorient, Morbihan, France
- Height: 1.79 m (5 ft 10 in)
- Position: Forward

Team information
- Current team: Bournemouth
- Number: 22

Youth career
- 2013–2023: Lorient

Senior career*
| Years | Team | Apps | (Gls) |
| 2022–2023 | Lorient B | 18 | (9) |
| 2023–2025 | Lorient | 48 | (14) |
| 2025– | Bournemouth | 36 | (13) |
| 2025 | → Lorient (loan) | 13 | (13) |

International career^{‡}
| 2021–2022 | France U16 | 9 | (5) |
| 2022–2023 | France U17 | 9 | (9) |
| 2023 | France U18 | 2 | (1) |
| 2023–2024 | France U19 | 12 | (0) |
| 2025 | France U20 | 2 | (1) |
| 2025– | France U21 | 5 | (3) |
| 2026– | France | 2 | (1) |
Medal record
Men's football
Representing France
UEFA European Under-19 Championship
| Runner-up | 2024 Northern Ireland |
- * Club domestic league appearances and goals as of 23:04, 15 November 2026 (UTC) ‡ National team caps and goals as of 15 November 2026

Eli Junior Éric Anatole Rainha Kroupi (born 23 June 2006) is a French professional footballer who plays as a forward for Premier League club Bournemouth and the France national team.

== Early life ==
Born in Lorient, Morbihan, Kroupi is the son of former Ivory Coast footballer Éli Kroupi. His mother is of Portuguese descent.

== Club career ==
=== Lorient ===
A product of the FC Lorient Academy, Kroupi started playing with the reserve team in the Championnat National 2 in the end of the 2021–22 season. He signed his first professional contract with the club on the summer 2022. While proving to be a regular goalscorer with the reserve, he made his first appearance with the professional squad in April 2023, for the Ligue 1 game against Marseille.

Kroupi made his professional debut for Lorient on the 3 June 2023 during a home Ligue 1 against Strasbourg, to be the youngest player in his club's history breaking previous record of Mattéo Guendouzi, when he replaced Romain Faivre at the 83rd minute and his team won the match 2–1. Despite this being the last round of the 2022–23 French top flight, Kroupi became at the age of 16 years and 345 days, the third youngest player to enter the field that season, only behind Warren Zaïre-Emery and Leny Yoro.

On 23 September 2023, he scored his first Ligue 1 goal for Lorient in a 5–3 away defeat against Nantes, to be the youngest scorer in club's history, breaking previous record of André Ayew. A month later, on 8 October, after scoring twice in a 3–3 away draw against Lyon, he became the youngest player to score a brace in Ligue 1 since Bernard Zénier in 1974, at 17 years old and 107 days. On 11 October 2023, he was named by English newspaper The Guardian as one of the best players born in 2006 worldwide. In the 2024–25 season, he finished as the top scorer in Ligue 2 with 22 goals, helping Lorient secure promotion back to the top division.

=== Bournemouth ===
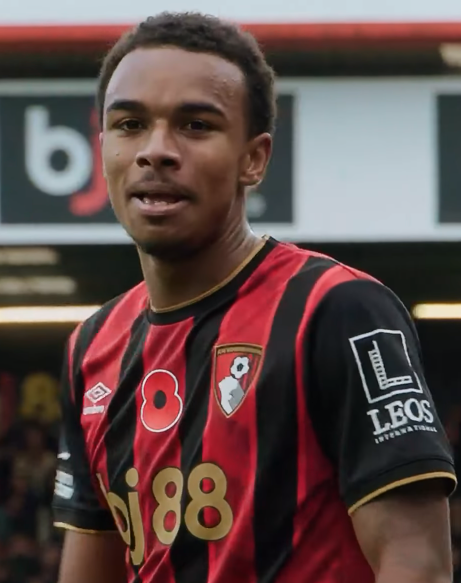
Kroupi in 2025

On 3 February 2025, Premier League club Bournemouth agreed to sign Kroupi for £10 million. He would remain at Lorient for the rest of the 2024–25 season. He made his debut for the club on 15 August 2025, in a 4–2 defeat to Liverpool. He scored his first goal for the club on 27 September 2025, in a 2–2 draw with Leeds United. He followed this up with a brace against Crystal Palace on 18 October and, after scoring against Nottingham Forest the following week, he became the fifteenth teenager in Premier League history to score in three consecutive games. With teammate Rayan completing the same feat later in the season, the duo made Bournemouth the first club in Premier League history to have two teenagers score in three consecutive league matches in a single season.

On 3 May 2026, he scored a penalty against Crystal Palace to mark his twelfth goal of the season, the joint highest goal tally by any teenager since the inception of the Premier League, alongside Robbie Fowler and Robbie Keane. On 19 May 2026, he scored his thirteenth goal of the season against Manchester City, the highest number of goals scored by any teenager in a debut season in Premier League history, surpassing the previous record. This goal in the 1–1 draw put Bournemouth in European football for the first time in their history and also, along with his earlier goals against Arsenal and Manchester United made Kroupi the first teenager to score against all three of the teams finishing the season in the top three in a single season. In July 2026, Kroupi underwent foot surgery after suffering an injury during pre-season in Austria and was ruled out for three to four months.

== International career ==
Kroupi was eligible to play for France, Ivory Coast and Portugal until he made his debut for France.

Kroupi is a youth international for France, first receiving a call with the under-16 in October 2021. He soon became a prolific goalscorer with France youth teams, with the U16, and even more with the U17, scoring 9 goals in his first 9 appearances with the latter.

In May 2023, Kroupi was selected by Jean-Luc Vannuchi for the European Under-17 Championship, as France were the reigning champions. He was however forced to withdraw due to injury, while his team would eventually go on to reach the final of the competition.

In May 2026, Kroupi rejected an approach from coach Roberto Martínez of the Portugal national football team ahead of the 2026 FIFA World Cup, stating his desire to represent France at senior level.

In November 2026, Kroupi was called by up by Zinedine Zidane to the senior French national football team for the first time ahead of their Nations League ties against Italy and Turkey. He made his debut on 12 November 2026, coming on as a 78th minute substitute in a 3-1 loss to Italy. Three days later, he went on to score a goal during a 2-1 win against Turkey.

== Style of play ==
Kroupi is a versatile attacking player who operates mainly as a left-sided forward or centre-forward. He is known for his intelligent movement, close control and ability to link play between midfield and attack. Rather than staying wide, Kroupi often moves into central areas and half-spaces to receive the ball, combine with teammates and create shooting opportunities.

His dribbling relies on agility, quick changes of direction and technical ability, allowing him to escape pressure in tight areas. As a goalscorer, Kroupi is effective both inside the box and from distance, particularly when cutting inside from the left onto his stronger right foot. His movement, composure and attacking instincts have been key characteristics of his playing style.

== Career statistics ==
=== Club ===
As of match played 8 November 2026

Appearances and goals by club, season and competition
| Club | Season | League | | | National cup (Note: Includes Coupe de France, FA Cup) | | League cup (Note: Includes EFL Cup) | | Europe | | Total | |
| Club | Season | Division | Apps | Goals | Apps | Goals | Apps | Goals | Apps | Goals | Apps | Goals |
|---|---|---|---|---|---|---|---|---|---|---|---|---|
| Lorient II | 2021–22 | Championnat National 2 | 3 | 2 | — | | — | | — | | 3 | 2 |
| Lorient II | 2022–23 | Championnat National 2 | 15 | 7 | — | | — | | — | | 15 | 7 |
| Lorient II | Total | | 18 | 9 | — | | — | | — | | 18 | 9 |
| Lorient | 2022–23 | Ligue 1 | 1 | 0 | 0 | 0 | — | | — | | 1 | 0 |
| Lorient | 2023–24 | Ligue 1 | 30 | 5 | 1 | 0 | — | | — | | 31 | 5 |
| Lorient | 2024–25 (Note: Part of the season spent on loan from Bournemouth) | Ligue 2 | 30 | 22 | 2 | 1 | — | | — | | 32 | 23 |
| Lorient | Total | | 61 | 27 | 3 | 1 | — | | — | | 64 | 28 |
| Bournemouth | 2025–26 | Premier League | 33 | 13 | 1 | 0 | 1 | 0 | — | | 35 | 13 |
| Bournemouth | 2026–27 | Premier League | 3 | 0 | 0 | 0 | 1 | 0 | 0 | 0 | 4 | 0 |
| Bournemouth | Total | | 36 | 13 | 1 | 0 | 2 | 0 | 0 | 0 | 39 | 13 |
| Career total | | | 113 | 49 | 4 | 1 | 2 | 0 | 0 | 0 | 121 | 50 |

=== International ===
As of match played 15 November 2026

Appearances and goals by national team and year
| National team | Year | Apps | Goals |
|---|---|---|---|
| France | 2026 | 2 | 1 |
| Total | | 2 | 1 |

As of match played 15 November 2026
Scores and results list France's goal tally first, score column indicates score after each Kroupi goal

List of international goals scored by Eli Junior Kroupi
| No. | Date | Venue | Cap | Opponent | Score | Result | Competition |
|---|---|---|---|---|---|---|---|
| 1 | 15 November 2026 | Stade Atlantique, Bordeaux, France | 2 | Turkey | 2–0 | 2–1 | 2026–27 UEFA Nations League A |

== Honours ==
Lorient

- Ligue 2: 2024–25

France U19

- UEFA European Under-19 Championship runner-up: 2024

Individual

- Ligue 2 top goalscorer: 2024–25
- UNFP Ligue 2 Player of the Year: 2024–25
- UNFP Ligue 2 Team of the Year: 2024–25
