= Thomas Monconduit =

French footballer (born 1991)

Personal information
- Date of birth: 10 February 1991 (age 35)
- Place of birth: Drancy, France
- Height: 1.84 m (6 ft 0 in)
- Position: Midfielder

Team information
- Current team: Amiens
- Number: 6

Youth career
- 1999–2005: Drancy
- 2005–2006: Créteil
- 2006–2007: INF Clairefontaine
- 2007–2010: Auxerre

Senior career*
Years	Team	Apps	(Gls)
2010–2014	Auxerre B	63	(3)
2012–2014	Auxerre	42	(0)
2015–2020	Amiens	141	(6)
2015–2016	Amiens B	4	(0)
2020–2022	Lorient	61	(5)
2022–2025	Saint-Étienne	46	(0)
2025–	Amiens	33	(0)

International career
2009–2010	France U19	6	(0)
- * Club domestic league appearances and goals as of 12 May 2026

Thomas Monconduit (born 10 February 1991) is a French professional footballer who plays as a midfielder for Ligue 3 club Amiens.

== Club career ==
=== Amiens ===
Monconduit joined Amiens in 2015 after spending a year without a club while recovering from three surgeries for an inguinal hernia. He played for the club during their ascent from the third-tier National division to Ligue 1, becoming a key figure in their historic promotion in 2017. In April 2018, during his first season in the top flight, Monconduit voluntarily stepped down as captain, stating that the role created "unnecessary pressure" that affected his individual performance. He served as captain from August 2016 until April 2018.

=== Lorient ===
On 26 August 2020, Monconduit signed a three-year contract with FC Lorient.

=== Saint-Étienne ===
On 30 August 2022, Monconduit moved to Saint-Étienne on a three-year contract. During his time with Saint-Etienne, he made 50 appearances and contributed to the club's return to Ligue 1. However, following a surgery and the arrival of coach Eirik Horneland, he found himself out of the first-team plans during the final year of his contract.

=== Amiens ===
On 3 February 2025, Monconduit returned to Amiens on a half-season contract. On 26 June 2025, he signed a one-year contract extension. During the 2025–26 season, he was again named captain following a long-term injury to teammate Victor Lobry. On 21 November 2025, Monconduit announced that the 2025–26 season would be his last as a professional footballer. Citing physical and mental fatigue, he expressed a desire to discover life without football and mentioned a potential interest in transitioning into a sporting coordinator role.

== Personal life ==
Monconduit was born in Drancy. His grandmother, Muguette Jacquaint, served as a deputy for the French Communist Party for 26 years.

In 2017, he joined the support committee for François Ruffin during his legislative campaign. He has frequently spoken out against the star system and wealth disparity within professional football, stating in interviews that he prefers to live a normal life and has considered entering politics following his athletic career.

== Career statistics ==
As of match played 2 June 2024

Appearances and goals by club, season and competition
Club	Season	League			National cup		Other		Total	
Club	Season	Division	Apps	Goals	Apps	Goals	Apps	Goals	Apps	Goals
Auxerre B	2010–11	CFA	21	0	—		—		21	0
Auxerre B	2011–12	CFA	30	3	—		—		30	3
Auxerre B	2012–13	CFA	10	0	—		—		10	0
Auxerre B	2013–14	CFA 2	2	0	—		—		2	0
Auxerre B	Total		63	3	—		—		63	3
Auxerre	2011–12	Ligue 1	0	0	1	0	0	0	1	0
Auxerre	2012–13	Ligue 2	15	0	0	0	0	0	15	0
Auxerre	2013–14	Ligue 2	27	0	3	1	2 (Note: Appearance(s) in the Coupe de la Ligue)	0	32	1
Auxerre	Total		42	0	4	1	2	0	48	1
Amiens	2015–16	National	19	2	0	0	0	0	19	2
Amiens	2016–17	Ligue 2	36	3	0	0	0	0	36	3
Amiens	2017–18	Ligue 1	34	1	0	0	2	0	36	1
Amiens	2018–19	Ligue 1	33	0	1	0	1	0	35	0
Amiens	2019–20	Ligue 1	19	0	1	0	3	1	23	1
Amiens	Total		141	6	2	0	6	1	149	7
Amiens B	2015–16	CFA 2	4	0	—		—		4	0
Lorient	2020–21	Ligue 1	27	2	1	0	—		28	2
Lorient	2021–22	Ligue 1	34	3	1	0	—		35	3
Lorient	Total		61	5	2	0	—		63	5
Saint-Étienne	2022–23	Ligue 2	23	0	1	0	—		24	0
Saint-Étienne	2023–24	Ligue 2	23	0	1	0	2 (Note: One appearance in the Ligue 2 promotion play-offs, one appearance in the Ligue 1 relegation/promotion play-offs)	0	26	0
Saint-Étienne	Total		46	0	2	0	2	0	50	0
Career total			357	14	10	1	10	1	377	16
