= Bamo Meïté =

Ivorian footballer (born 2001)

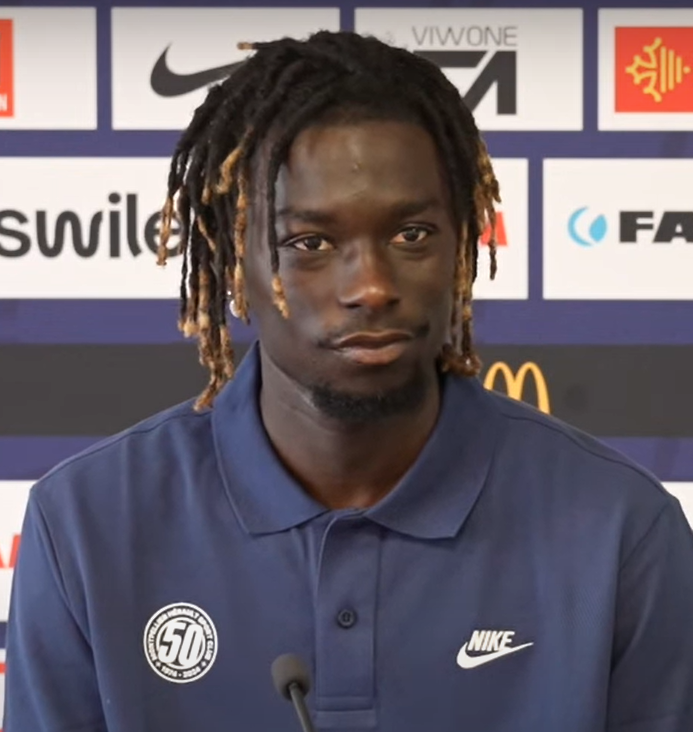
- Meïté with Montpellier in 2025

Personal information
- Full name: Bamo Abdoul Koudouss Meïté
- Date of birth: 3 December 2001 (age 24)
- Place of birth: Kani, Ivory Coast
- Height: 1.85 m (6 ft 1 in)
- Positions: Centre-back; right-back

Team information
- Current team: Marseille
- Number: 18

Youth career
- TU Verrières-le-Buisson
- ASF Le Perreux 94
- CO Vincennes
- –2018: Créteil
- 2018–2019: Montfermeil
- 2019–2020: Laval

Senior career*
Years	Team	Apps	(Gls)
2019–2020	Laval B	13	(0)
2020–2021	Laval	10	(0)
2021–2022	Lorient B	23	(0)
2023–2024	Lorient	19	(1)
2023–2024	→ Marseille (loan)	16	(0)
2024–	Marseille	3	(0)
2025	→ Montpellier (loan)	7	(0)
2025–2026	→ Lorient (loan)	25	(0)

International career^{‡}
2023	Ivory Coast U23	1	(0)
- * Club domestic league appearances and goals as of 19 May 2026 ‡ National team caps and goals as of 21 November 2023

Bamo Abdoul Koudouss Meïté (born 3 December 2001) is an Ivorian professional footballer who plays as a centre-back or right-back for Ligue 1 club Marseille.

== Career ==
Born in Kani, Ivory Coast, Meïté arrived in France at the age of seven moving to Paris. He played in the regional youth championships for FC Bry and Le Perreux, then for Vincennes, Créteil and FC Montfermeil in U18s. In October 2019, after playing a few matches at senior level with Montfermeil, he joined Laval after a conclusive three-week trial. Initially recruited with a view to strengthening the U19 team, he impressed with his physical density and maturity and quickly established himself at senior level, where his coach moved him from a midfield position to a centre-back role.

Meïté played his first match in the first team on 1 September 2020 against Stade Briochin in the Championnat National. Meïté joined FC Lorient in the summer of 2021, joining the club's reserve team. He stood out during the 2021–22 season, contributing to the team's second place in Championnat National 2. He trained regularly with the first team and coach Christophe Pélissier summoned him several times to the professional group, where he made five appearances on the substitutes' bench during the 2021–2022 season, without coming into play. On 1 June 2022, Meïté signed his first professional contract with FC Lorient, for a period of three years.

It was finally Régis Le Bris who gave him his chance in the first team on 8 January 2023, during a French Cup match against AS La Châtaigneraie. Lorient won that day by six goals to zero. He played his first match in Ligue 1 in a 1–1 tie against Monaco on 11 January 2023.

On 3 February 2025, Meïté moved on loan to Montpellier until the end of the season.

== Personal life ==
Bamo Meïté holds both Ivorian and French nationalities. He is the cousin of Yakou Meïté, who is also a professional footballer.

== Career statistics ==
=== Club ===
As of match played 22 October 2026

Appearances and goals by club, season and competition
Club	Season	League			Coupe de France		Europe		Total	
Club	Season	Division	Apps	Goals	Apps	Goals	Apps	Goals	Apps	Goals
Stade Lavallois II	2019–20	CFA	8	0	—		—		8	0
Stade Lavallois II	2020–21	CFA	5	0	—		—		5	0
Stade Lavallois II	Total		13	0	—		—		13	0
Stade Lavallois	2020–21	Ligue 3	10	0	1	0	—		10	0
Lorient II	2021–22	Ligue 3	21	0	—		—		21	0
Lorient II	2022–23	Ligue 3	2	0	—		—		2	0
Lorient II	Total		23	0	—		—		23	0
Lorient	2022–23	Ligue 1	17	1	3	0	—		20	1
Lorient	2023–24	Ligue 1	2	0	—		—		2	0
Lorient	Total		19	1	3	0	—		22	1
Marseille (loan)	2023–24	Ligue 1	16	0	2	0	7 (Note: Appearances in UEFA Europa League)	0	25	0
Marseille	2024–25	Ligue 1	3	0	—		—		3	0
Marseille	2026–27	Ligue 1	0	0	0	0	2	0	2	0
Marseille	Total		3	0	0	0	2	0	5	0
Montpellier (loan)	2024–25	Ligue 1	7	0	—		—		7	0
Lorient (loan)	2025–26	Ligue 1	25	0	4	0	—		29	0
Career total			116	1	10	0	9	0	135	1
