= Igor Silva (footballer) =

Brazilian footballer (born 1996)

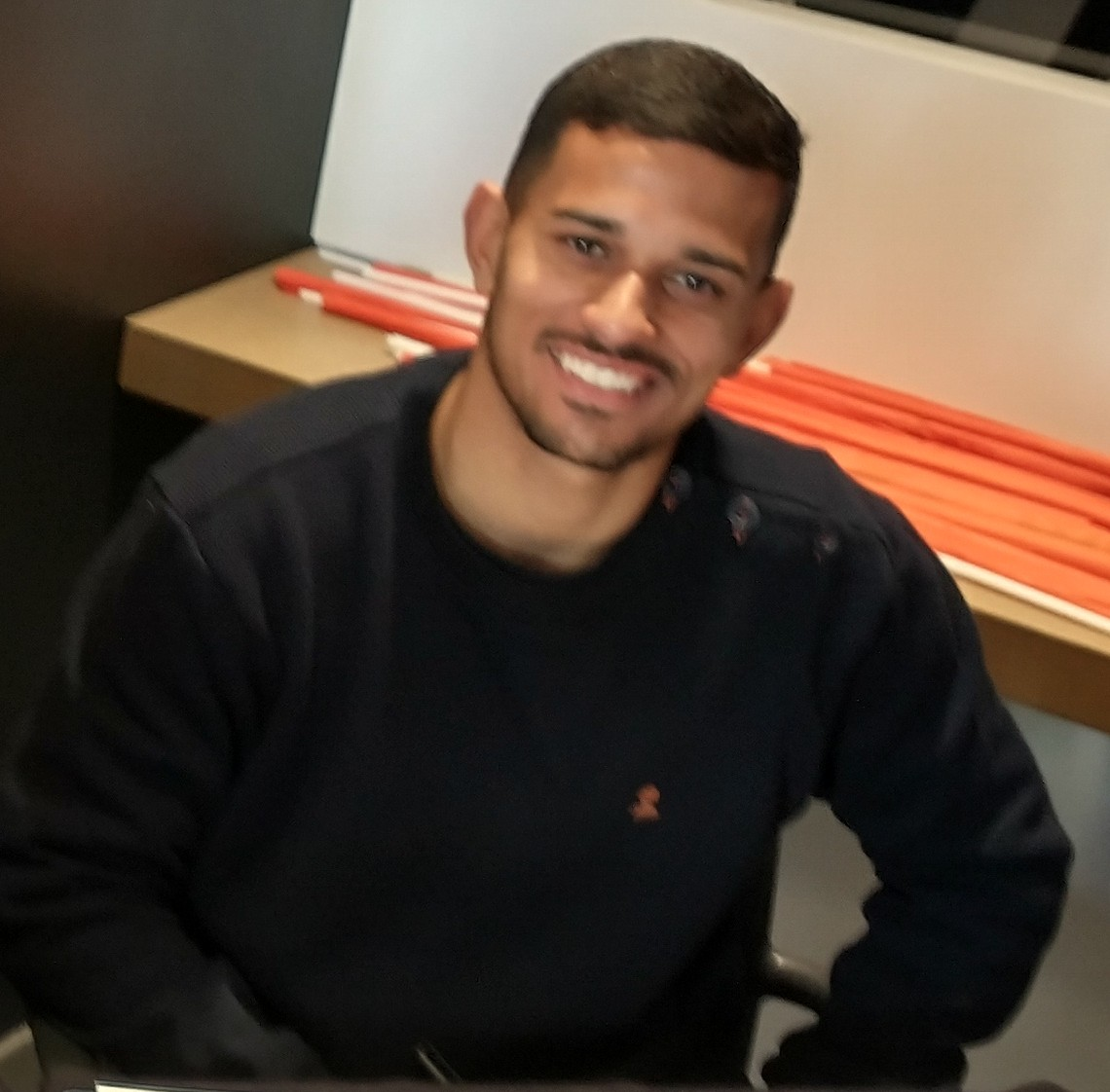
- Igor in 2022

Personal information
- Full name: Igor Silva de Almeida
- Date of birth: 21 August 1996 (age 30)
- Place of birth: Rio de Janeiro, Brazil
- Height: 1.73 m (5 ft 8 in)
- Position: Right-back

Team information
- Current team: Rodina Moscow
- Number: 2

Youth career
- Comercial-SP
- 2015–2016: → Asteras Tripolis (loan)

Senior career*
Years	Team	Apps	(Gls)
2013–2016	Comercial-SP	9	(0)
2015–2016	→ Asteras Tripolis (loan)	0	(0)
2016–2018	Asteras Tripolis	27	(1)
2018–2020	Olympiacos	2	(0)
2018–2019	→ AEK Larnaca (loan)	20	(1)
2019–2020	→ Osijek (loan)	27	(1)
2020–2021	Osijek	31	(0)
2021–2026	Lorient	82	(1)
2026–	Rodina Moscow	6	(0)
- * Club domestic league appearances and goals as of 22 November 2026

Igor Silva de Almeida (born 21 August 1996), known as Igor Silva or Igor Carioca, is a Brazilian professional footballer who plays as a right-back for Russian Premier League club Rodina Moscow.

== Career ==
=== Comercial-SP ===
Born in Rio de Janeiro, Igor began his career in the youth sides of Comercial-SP, as a forward. He was promoted to the first team in June 2013, aged 16, and made his senior debut on 31 July of that year, coming on as a late substitute in a 1–1 Copa Paulista home draw against Ferroviária.

Igor later returned to the under-17 squad, before returning to the first team in April 2014, after their relegation in the 2014 Campeonato Paulista. He started to feature regularly during that season's Copa Paulista, being one of the few players kept for the 2015 campaign.

Igor was mainly a backup option during the 2015 Campeonato Paulista Série A2, as the club suffered another relegation.

=== Asteras Tripolis ===
On 30 August 2015, Comercial loaned Igor to Greek side Asteras Tripolis; he also extended his contract with Bafo. Initially assigned to the youth categories, he made his first team debut on 3 February 2016, replacing Pablo Mazza in a 1–1 home draw against Olympiacos, for the season's Greek Football Cup.

On 16 May 2016, Asteras bought Igor permanently, with the player signing a five-year contract and being definitely promoted to the first team. He was later converted into a right-back during the pre-season, and became a regular starter.

=== Olympiacos ===
On 11 January 2018, Igor joined fellow Super League Greece club Olympiacos as a replacement for the departing Diogo Figueiras. He made his debut for the club on 29 April, replacing Omar Elabdellaoui in a 4–0 home routing of Panetolikos.

==== Loan to AEK Larnaca ====
Igor did not play regularly after being found surplus to requirements by manager Pedro Martins, and joined Cypriot club AEK Larnaca on a season-long loan deal on 18 July 2018. He was a regular starter in the club's UEFA Europa League run, as they reached the group stage.

=== Osijek ===
On 3 August 2019, Igor joined Croatian club NK Osijek on a season-long loan deal. On 29 July 2020, the club announced the acquisition of the player, signing a three-year contract from Olympiacos on a transfer fee in the range of € 1 million.

=== Lorient ===
On 23 July 2021, Igor joined French club Lorient on a five-year contract. He made his debut for the club on 8 August, starting in a 1–1 away draw against Saint-Étienne.

A regular starter during the first half of the season, Igor lost his starting spot to Houboulang Mendes during the second half. Despite Mendes' departure to Almería, Igor spent the 2022–23 campaign as a backup to new signing Gédéon Kalulu.

=== Rodina Moscow ===
On 27 September 2026, Silva signed with Rodina Moscow in Russia.

== Career statistics ==
As of match played 22 November 2026

Appearances and goals by club, season and competition
Club	Season	League			State league		Cup		Continental		Other		Total	
Club	Season	Division	Apps	Goals	Apps	Goals	Apps	Goals	Apps	Goals	Apps	Goals	Apps	Goals
Comercial-SP	2013	Paulista A2	—		0	0	—		—		1 (Note: Appearance(s) in Copa Paulista)	0	1	0
Comercial-SP	2014	Paulista	—		0	0	—		—		13	0	13	0
Comercial-SP	2015	Paulista A2	—		9	0	—		—		—		9	0
Comercial-SP	Total		—		9	0	—		—		14	0	23	0
Asteras Tripolis	2015–16	Super League Greece	0	0	—		1	0	—		—		1	0
Asteras Tripolis	2016–17	Super League Greece	15	1	—		4	0	—		—		19	1
Asteras Tripolis	2017–18	Super League Greece	12	0	—		2	0	—		—		14	0
Asteras Tripolis	Total		27	1	—		7	0	—		—		34	1
Olympiacos	2017–18	Super League Greece	2	0	—		0	0	—		—		2	0
AEK Larnaca (loan)	2018–19	Cypriot First Division	20	1	—		2	0	12 (Note: Appearance(s) in UEFA Europa League)	0	1 (Note: Appearance(s) in Cypriot Super Cup)	0	35	1
Osijek	2019–20	Prva HNL	27	1	—		4	0	—		—		31	1
Osijek	2020–21	Prva HNL	31	0	—		3	0	1	0	—		35	0
Osijek	Total		58	1	—		7	0	1	0	—		66	1
Lorient	2021–22	Ligue 1	28	0	—		0	0	—		—		28	0
Lorient	2022–23	Ligue 1	7	0	—		3	0	—		—		10	0
Lorient	2023–24	Ligue 1	5	0	—		0	0	—		—		5	0
Lorient	2024–25	Ligue 2	25	0	—		3	0	—		—		28	0
Lorient	2025–26	Ligue 1	17	1	—		2	0	—		—		19	1
Lorient	Total		82	1	—		8	0	—		—		90	1
Rodina Moscow	2026–27	Russian Premier League	6	0	—		0	0	—		—		6	0
Career total			195	4	9	0	24	0	13	0	15	0	256	4

== Honours ==
AEK Larnaca

- Cypriot Super Cup: 2018

Lorient

- Ligue 2: 2024–25

Individual

- Cypriot First Division Team of the Year: 2018–19
- Croatian First League Team of the Year: 2019–20, 2020–21
