= Siriné Doucouré =

French footballer (born 2002)

Personal information
- Full name: Siriné Ckene Doucouré
- Date of birth: 8 April 2002 (age 24)
- Place of birth: Nogent-sur-Marne, France
- Height: 1.93 m (6 ft 4 in)
- Position: Forward

Team information
- Current team: TOP Oss
- Number: 99

Youth career
- 2016–2018: Paris FC
- 2018–2020: Châteauroux

Senior career*
Years	Team	Apps	(Gls)
2020–2022	Châteauroux II	11	(0)
2020–2022	Châteauroux	31	(5)
2022	Lorient II	1	(0)
2022–2025	Lorient	23	(1)
2024	→ Valenciennes (loan)	13	(0)
2024–2025	→ Laval (loan)	21	(1)
2025–	TOP Oss	26	(3)
- * Club domestic league appearances and goals as of 28 April 2026

Siriné Ckene Doucouré (born 8 April 2002) is a professional footballer who plays as a forward for Dutch Eerste Divisie club TOP Oss. Born in France, he represents Mali national team.

== Club career ==
Doucouré is a youth product of the academies of Paris FC and Châteauroux. On 9 June 2020, he signed his first professional contract with Châteauroux. He made his professional debut with Châteauroux in a 1–0 Ligue 2 loss to Valenciennes on 12 September 2020. On 1 September 2022, he transferred to Lorient in the Ligue 1 on a four-year contract.

On 1 February 2024, Doucouré was loaned by Valenciennes.

On 2 September 2025, Doucouré signed a two-year contract with TOP Oss in the Netherlands.

== International career ==
Doucouré was included in the Mali national team for the 2023 Africa Cup of Nations.

== Personal life ==
Doucouré was born in Nogent-sur-Marne, France. He holds French and Malian nationalities.

== Career statistics ==
As of matches played 20 December 2025

Appearances and goals by club, season and competition
Club	Season	League			Cup		Other		Total	
Club	Season	Division	Apps	Goals	Apps	Goals	Apps	Goals	Apps	Goals
Châteauroux II	2019–20	Championnat National 3	2	0	—		—		2	0
Châteauroux II	2020–21	Championnat National 3	2	0	—		—		2	0
Châteauroux II	2021–22	Championnat National 3	7	5	—		—		7	5
Châteauroux II	Total		11	5	—		—		11	5
Châteauroux	2020–21	Ligue 2	12	2	1	0	—		13	2
Châteauroux	2021–22	CFA	16	3	—		—		16	3
Châteauroux	2022–23	CFA	3	0	—		—		3	0
Châteauroux	Total		31	5	1	0	—		32	5
Lorient II	2022–23	CFA 2	1	0	—		—		1	0
Lorient	2022–23	Ligue 1	12	0	3	0	—		15	0
Lorient	2023–24	Ligue 1	11	1	0	0	—		11	1
Lorient	Total		23	1	3	0	—		26	1
Valenciennes (loan)	2023–24	Ligue 2	13	0	3	1	—		16	1
Laval (loan)	2024–25	Ligue 2	21	1	4	0	—		25	1
TOP Oss	2025–26	Eerste Divisie	16	1	2	0	—		18	1
Career total			116	13	13	1	0	0	129	14
