= Darlin Yongwa =

Cameroonian footballer (born 2000)

Personal information
- Full name: Darlin Zidane Yongwa Ngameni
- Date of birth: 22 September 2000 (age 26)
- Place of birth: Douala, Cameroon
- Height: 1.77 m (5 ft 10 in)
- Position: Left-back

Team information
- Current team: Norwich City
- Number: 13

Youth career
- –2018: Brasseries du Cameroun
- 2018–2019: Niort B

Senior career*
Years	Team	Apps	(Gls)
2019–2022	Niort	66	(0)
2022–2026	Lorient	92	(3)
2026–	Norwich City	6	(1)

International career^{‡}
2022–	Cameroon	15	(1)
- * Club domestic league appearances and goals as of 04:09, 4 November 2026 (UTC) ‡ National team caps and goals as of 21:03, 27 March 2026 (UTC)

Darlin Zidane Yongwa Ngameni (born 22 September 2000) is a Cameroonian professional footballer who plays as a left-back for EFL Championship club Norwich City and the Cameroon national team.

== Club career ==
On 28 February 2019, Yongwa joined Niort from the Cameroonian club EFBC. He made his professional debut with Niort in a 2–2 Ligue 2 tie with Auxerre on 27 July 2019.

On 24 June 2022, Yongwa signed a four-year contract with Lorient.

On 4 August 2026, following his departure from Ligue 1 side Lorient, with whom he made 97 appearances, Yongwa joined Norwich City on a four-year-deal.

== International career ==
Yongwa debuted with the Cameroon national team as a late substitute in a friendly 2–0 loss to Uzbekistan on 23 September 2022.

== Career statistics ==
=== Club ===
As of match played 3 November 2026

Appearances and goals by club, season and competition
Club	Season	League			National cup (Note: Includes Coupe de France, FA Cup)		League cup (Note: Includes Coupe de la Ligue, EFL Cup)		Other		Total	
Club	Season	Division	Apps	Goals	Apps	Goals	Apps	Goals	Apps	Goals	Apps	Goals
Niort B	2018–19	National 2	3	0	—		—		—		3	0
Niort B	2019–20	National 2	11	0	—		—		—		11	0
Niort B	Total		14	0	0	0	0	0	0	0	14	0
Niort	2019–20	Ligue 2	8	0	3	0	1	0	—		12	0
Niort	2020–21	Ligue 2	27	0	1	0	— (Note: The Coupe de la Ligue was indefinitely suspended following the 2019–20 edition)		2 (Note: Matches played in the 2020–21 Ligue 2 relegation playoffs)	0	30	0
Niort	2021–22	Ligue 2	31	0	— (Note: Niort excluded from the 2021–22 Coupe de France)		—		—		31	0
Niort	Total		66	0	4	0	0	0	2	0	72	0
Lorient	2022–23	Ligue 1	14	1	3	0	—		—		17	1
Lorient	2023–24	Ligue 1	22	1	0	0	—		—		22	1
Lorient	2024–25	Ligue 2	33	1	0	0	—		—		33	1
Lorient	2025–26	Ligue 1	23	0	2	0	—		—		25	0
Lorient	Total		92	3	5	0	0	0	0	0	97	3
Norwich City	2026–27	EFL Championship	6	1	0	0	2	0	—		8	1
Career total			178	4	9	0	3	0	2	0	192	4

=== International ===
As of match played 27 March 2026

Appearances and goals by national team and year
National team	Year	Apps	Goals
Cameroon	2022	1	0
Cameroon	2023	4	0
Cameroon	2024	4	1
Cameroon	2025	4	0
Cameroon	2026	2	0
Total		15	1

Scores and results list Cameroon's goal tally first.

List of international goals scored by Darlin Yongwa
No.	Date	Venue	Opponent	Score	Result	Competition
1	9 January 2024	King Abdullah Sports City Stadium, Jeddah, Saudi Arabia	Zambia	1–1	1–1	Friendly

== Honours ==
Lorient

- Ligue 2: 2024–25
