= Ibrahima Koné (footballer, born 1999) =

Malian footballer

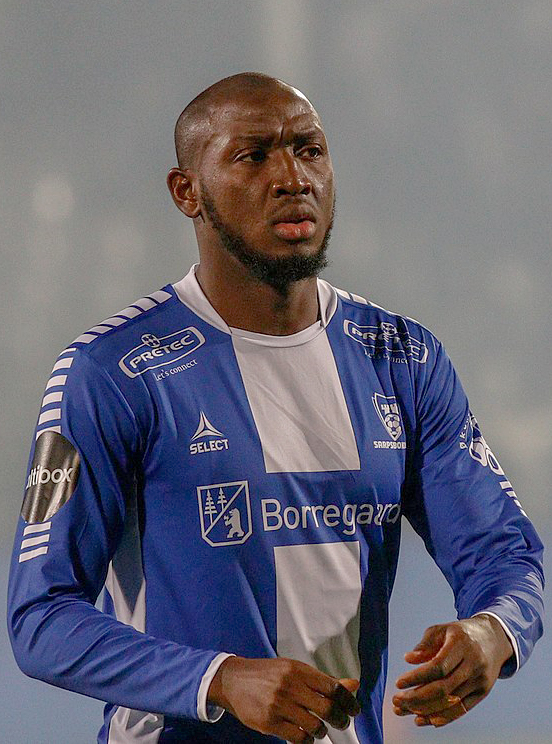
- Koné playing with Sarpsborg 08 in 2021

Personal information
- Full name: Ibrahima Koné
- Date of birth: 16 June 1999 (age 27)
- Place of birth: Bamako, Mali
- Height: 1.90 m (6 ft 3 in)
- Position: Forward

Team information
- Current team: Almería

Youth career
- 2016-2017: CO Bamako

Senior career*
| Years | Team | Apps | (Gls) |
| 2016–2017 | CO Bamako | 5 | (0) |
| 2018–2020 | Haugesund | 48 | (8) |
| 2020 | → Adana Demirspor (loan) | 5 | (0) |
| 2021–2022 | Sarpsborg 08 | 28 | (11) |
| 2022–2023 | Lorient | 54 | (12) |
| 2023– | Almería | 9 | (0) |
| 2024–2025 | → Al-Okhdood (loan) | 14 | (3) |

International career^{‡}
| 2017–2019 | Mali U20 | 1 | (0) |
| 2019 | Mali U23 | 3 | (0) |
| 2017– | Mali | 20 | (13) |
- * Club domestic league appearances and goals as of 31 January 2025 ‡ National team caps and goals as of 23:11, 20 March 2025 (UTC)

Ibrahima Koné (born 16 June 1999) is a Malian professional footballer who plays as a forward for Spanish club Almería, and the Mali national team.

== Club career ==
=== Early career ===
Born in Bamako, Koné began playing with hometown side CO Bamako, hiding from his family that he was playing football. Promoted to the first team in 2015, he scored nine goals in his first senior season, the 2016 Malian Première Division.

=== Haugesund ===
In February 2018, Koné signed for Norwegian Eliteserien club FK Haugesund on a contract until 2021. He made his debut abroad on 11 March, starting in a 2–1 away win over Odds BK.

Koné scored his first goal for the club on 5 August 2018, netting the opener in a 2–1 win at Tromsø IL. On 14 July of the following year, he scored a brace in a 5–1 home routing of the same opponent.

On 12 January 2020, Koné was loaned to Turkish Süper Lig side Adana Demirspor until the end of the season. However, he featured very rarely for the club, all as a substitute, before returning to Haugesund for the second stage of the 2020 campaign.

=== Sarpsborg 08 ===
On 10 January 2021, Koné was transferred to fellow Eliteserien club Sarpsborg 08, signing a three-year contract with the club. He was the club's top goalscorer with 11 goals during the season, which included four goals in a 5–0 home routing of Sandefjord on 29 August.

=== Lorient ===
On 31 January 2022, Koné signed a 4.5-year contract with French Ligue 1 club Lorient. He made his debut for the club six days later, scoring the second in a 2–0 home win over Lens.

On 8 April 2022, Koné scored a brace in a 6–2 home success over Saint-Étienne. He finished the campaign with five goals as the club narrowly avoided relegation.

=== Almería ===
On 16 August 2023, Koné signed a five-year deal with La Liga side Almería. On 16 October 2023 Koné underwent ankle surgery to repair a fractured right ankle he suffered during a friendly against Uganda, knocking him out of play for five months.

==== Al-Okhdood (loan) ====
On 30 August 2024, Koné joined Saudi Pro League club Al-Okhdood on a one-year loan from Almería.

== International career ==
Koné made his debut for the Mali national team on 22 July 2017 against Gambia, scoring a hat-trick in a 4–0 win. His next appearance for Mali took place four years later, in a 1–0 2022 FIFA World Cup qualification win over Rwanda on 1 September 2021. On 12 January 2022, Koné scored the only goal in Mali's opening AFCON game against Tunisia, winning the game 1–0 with a penalty in the 48th minute. This particular game received international attention as referee Janny Sikazwe blew for full-time first in the 85th minute, then again in the 89th minute, creating great controversy as Tunisian coach Mondher Kebaier branded the referees actions "inexplicable".

== Career statistics ==
=== Club ===
As of match played 31 January 2025

Appearances and goals by club, season and competition
| Club | Season | League | | | National Cup | | Europe | | Total | |
| Club | Season | Division | Apps | Goals | Apps | Goals | Apps | Goals | Apps | Goals |
|---|---|---|---|---|---|---|---|---|---|---|
| Haugesund | 2018 | Eliteserien | 22 | 1 | 5 | 1 | — | | 27 | 2 |
| Haugesund | 2019 | Eliteserien | 16 | 5 | 5 | 2 | 6 (Note: Appearance(s) in the UEFA Europa League) | 1 | 27 | 8 |
| Haugesund | 2020 | Eliteserien | 10 | 2 | — | | — | | 10 | 2 |
| Haugesund | Total | | 48 | 8 | 10 | 3 | 6 | 1 | 64 | 12 |
| Adana Demirspor (loan) | 2019–20 | TFF First League | 5 | 0 | 0 | 0 | — | | 5 | 0 |
| Sarpsborg 08 | 2021 | Eliteserien | 26 | 11 | 1 | 0 | — | | 27 | 11 |
| Lorient | 2021–22 | Ligue 1 | 16 | 5 | — | | — | | 16 | 5 |
| Lorient | 2022–23 | Ligue 1 | 37 | 7 | 3 | 2 | — | | 40 | 9 |
| Lorient | 2023–24 | Ligue 1 | 1 | 0 | — | | — | | 1 | 0 |
| Lorient | Total | | 54 | 12 | 3 | 2 | — | | 57 | 14 |
| Almería | 2023–24 | La Liga | 9 | 0 | 0 | 0 | — | | 9 | 0 |
| Al Okhdood (loan) | 2024–25 | Saudi Pro League | 14 | 3 | 1 | 0 | — | | 15 | 3 |
| Career total | | | 156 | 34 | 15 | 5 | 6 | 1 | 177 | 40 |

=== International ===
As of match played 20 March 2025

Appearances and goals by national team and year
| National team | Year | Apps | Goals |
|---|---|---|---|
| Mali | 2017 | 1 | 3 |
| Mali | 2021 | 5 | 5 |
| Mali | 2022 | 9 | 3 |
| Mali | 2023 | 2 | 2 |
| Mali | 2024 | 2 | 0 |
| Mali | 2025 | 1 | 0 |
| Total | | 20 | 13 |

==== International goals ====
Scores and results list Mali's goal tally first, score column indicates score after each Koné goal.

List of international goals scored by Ibrahima Koné
| No. | Date | Venue | Opponent | Score | Result | Competition |
|---|---|---|---|---|---|---|
| 1 | 22 July 2017 | Stade Modibo Kéïta, Bamako, Mali | Gambia | 1–0 | 4–0 | 2018 African Nations Championship qualification |
| 2 | 22 July 2017 | Stade Modibo Kéïta, Bamako, Mali | Gambia | 2–0 | 4–0 | 2018 African Nations Championship qualification |
| 3 | 22 July 2017 | Stade Modibo Kéïta, Bamako, Mali | Gambia | 3–0 | 4–0 | 2018 African Nations Championship qualification |
| 4 | 7 October 2021 | Stade Adrar, Agadir, Morocco | Kenya | 2–0 | 5–0 | 2022 FIFA World Cup qualification |
| 5 | 7 October 2021 | Stade Adrar, Agadir, Morocco | Kenya | 3–0 | 5–0 | 2022 FIFA World Cup qualification |
| 6 | 7 October 2021 | Stade Adrar, Agadir, Morocco | Kenya | 4–0 | 5–0 | 2022 FIFA World Cup qualification |
| 7 | 10 October 2021 | Nyayo National Stadium, Nairobi, Kenya | Kenya | 1–0 | 1–0 | 2022 FIFA World Cup qualification |
| 8 | 11 November 2021 | Nyamirambo Regional Stadium, Kigali, Rwanda | Rwanda | 2–0 | 3–0 | 2022 FIFA World Cup qualification |
| 9 | 12 January 2022 | Limbe Stadium, Limbe, Cameroon | Tunisia | 1–0 | 1–0 | 2021 Africa Cup of Nations |
| 10 | 16 January 2022 | Limbe Stadium, Limbe, Cameroon | Gambia | 1–0 | 1–1 | 2021 Africa Cup of Nations |
| 11 | 20 January 2022 | Japoma Stadium, Douala, Cameroon | Mauritania | 2–0 | 2–0 | 2021 Africa Cup of Nations |
| 12 | 18 June 2023 | Stade Alphonse Massemba-Débat, Brazzaville, Congo | Congo | 1–0 | 2–0 | 2023 Africa Cup of Nations qualification |
| 13 | 8 September 2023 | Stade du 26 Mars, Bamako, Mali | South Sudan | 1–0 | 4–0 | 2023 Africa Cup of Nations qualification |
