= Bamba Dieng =

Senegalese footballer (born 2000)

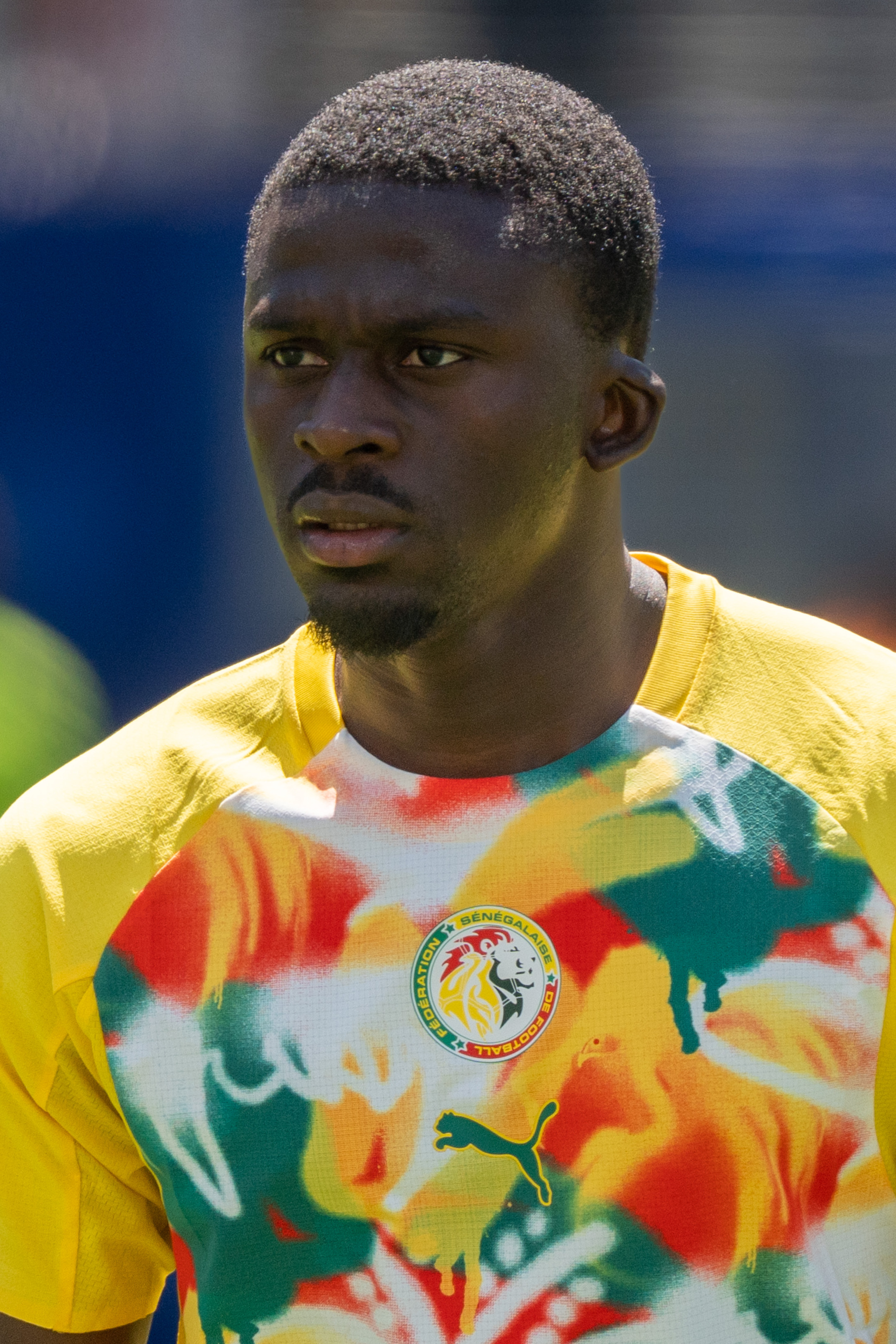
- Dieng with Senegal in 2026

Personal information
- Full name: Cheikh Ahmadou Bamba Mbacke Dieng
- Date of birth: 23 March 2000 (age 26)
- Place of birth: Pikine, Senegal
- Height: 1.78 m (5 ft 10 in)
- Position: Forward

Team information
- Current team: Red Star Belgrade
- Number: 9

Youth career
- 2010–2014: ASC SUNEOR
- 2014–2019: Diambars

Senior career*
Years	Team	Apps	(Gls)
2019–2021	Diambars	14	(12)
2020–2021	→ Marseille B (loan)	4	(0)
2021	→ Marseille (loan)	5	(0)
2021–2023	Marseille	35	(8)
2023–2026	Lorient	55	(18)
2024–2025	→ Angers (loan)	18	(3)
2025–2026	→ Lorient B (Loan)	1	(1)
2026–	Red Star Belgrade	7	(5)

International career^{‡}
2016	Senegal U17	2	(1)
2021–	Senegal	24	(2)
Medal record
Men's football
Representing Senegal
Africa Cup of Nations
Winner	2021 Cameroon
- * Club domestic league appearances and goals as of 11 October 2026 ‡ National team caps and goals as of 23:56, 16 June 2026 (UTC)

Cheikh Ahmadou Bamba Mbacke Dieng (born 23 March 2000) is a Senegalese professional footballer who plays as a forward for Serbian SuperLiga club Red Star Belgrade and for the Senegal national team.

== Club career ==
=== Diambars FC ===
Dieng began his career with Diambars in the Senegal Premier League, and had 12 goals in his first 14 games in his debut season. He finished as the top scorer of the Senegal Premier League for the 2019–20 season.

=== Marseille ===
Dieng signed for Marseille on a loan deal with an option to buy on 5 October 2020. He made his debut for the club in a 2–0 Coupe de France win over Auxerre on 10 February 2021, scoring a goal in the 92nd minute of the game.

=== Lorient ===
On 27 January 2023, Dieng signed a two-and-a-half-year contract with Ligue 1 club Lorient.He scored the opening goal in the 6th minute from a penalty kick, helping Lorient secure a 3-0 victory against AC Ajaccio.

=== Angers ===
On 30 August 2024, Dieng signed for Angers SCO on loan. Two weeks later, he scored his first goal for the club as an equalizer in a 1-1 draw against Strasbourg.

=== Return to Lorient ===
He returned to Lorient in the summer of 2025 and finished tied as top scorer for Lorient alongside Pablo Pagis as he scored 10 goals for his club. He left Lorient on 30 June 2026, at the end of his contract.

=== Red Star Belgrade ===
On 21 August 2026, Dieng signed for Serbian SuperLiga club Red Star Belgrade on a two-year contract, with an option to extend the deal for a further year.

== International career ==
Dieng debuted with the Senegal national team in a 4–1 2022 FIFA World Cup qualification win over Namibia on 9 October 2021.

He was called up to the Senegal squad for the 2021 Africa Cup of Nations in January 2022, scoring his first goal for the side in a 2–0 round of 16 victory over Cape Verde. In the 2021 Africa Cup of Nations Final, Dieng scored in the penalty shootout to help Senegal become the champions of the tournament.

He was appointed a Grand Officer of the National Order of the Lion by President of Senegal Macky Sall following the nation's victory at the 2021 Africa Cup of Nations.

On 21 May 2026, Dieng was selected by Senegal's coach Pape Thiaw in the 26-man squad for the 2026 FIFA World Cup.

== Career statistics ==
=== Club ===
As of match played 15 October 2026

Appearances and goals by club, season and competition
Club	Season	League			National cup		Continental		Total	
Club	Season	Division	Apps	Goals	Apps	Goals	Apps	Goals	Apps	Goals
Marseille B (loan)	2020–21	Championnat National 1	4	0	—		—		4	0
Marseille (loan)	2020–21	Ligue 1	5	0	1	1	0	0	6	1
Marseille	2021–22	Ligue 1	25	7	1	0	10 (Note: Five appearances in UEFA Europa League, five appearances and one goal in UEFA Conference League)	1	36	8
Marseille	2022–23	Ligue 1	10	1	2	1	—		12	2
Marseille	Marseille total		40	8	4	2	10	1	54	11
Lorient	2022–23	Ligue 1	15	3	1	0	—		16	3
Lorient	2023–24	Ligue 1	16	4	1	0	—		17	4
Lorient	2024–25	Ligue 2	2	1	0	0	—		2	1
Lorient	2025–26	Ligue 1	22	10	3	5	—		25	15
Lorient	Total		55	18	5	5	—		60	23
Angers (loan)	2024–25	Ligue 1	18	3	2	2	—		20	5
Lorient B	2025–26	Championnat National 1	1	1	—		—		1	1
Red Star Belgrade	2026–27	Serbian SuperLiga	6	2	0	0	0	7	2	
Career total			124	32	11	9	11	1	146	42

=== International ===
As of match played 16 June 2026

Appearances and goals by national team and year
National team	Year	Apps	Goals
Senegal	2021	4	0
Senegal	2022	13	2
Senegal	2023	1	0
Senegal	2024	2	0
Senegal	2026	4	0
Total		24	2

As of match played 25 November 2022.
Scores and results list Senegal's goal tally first, score column indicates score after each Dieng goal.

List of international goals scored by Bamba Dieng
No.	Date	Venue	Cap	Opponent	Score	Result	Competition
1	25 January 2022	Kouekong Stadium, Bafoussam, Cameroon	6	Cape Verde	2–0	2–0	2021 Africa Cup of Nations
2	25 November 2022	Al Thumama Stadium, Doha, Qatar	15	Qatar	3–1	3–1	2022 FIFA World Cup

== Honours ==
Lorient

- Ligue 2: 2024–25

Senegal

- Africa Cup of Nations: 2021

Individual

- Ligue 1 Goal of the Year: 2021–22

Orders

- Grand Officer of the National Order of the Lion: 2022
