= Ayman Kari =

French footballer (born 2004)

Personal information
- Full name: Ayman Foumou Kari
- Date of birth: 19 November 2004 (age 21)
- Place of birth: Ivry-sur-Seine, France
- Height: 5 ft 11 in (1.80 m)
- Position: Midfielder

Youth career
- 2014–2017: US Villejuif
- 2017–2023: Paris Saint-Germain

Senior career*
Years	Team	Apps	(Gls)
2023–2025	Paris Saint-Germain	0	(0)
2023	→ Lorient B (loan)	1	(0)
2023–2024	→ Lorient (loan)	19	(1)
Total		20	(1)

International career
2021–2022	France U18	3	(0)
2022–2023	France U19	5	(0)
2024	France U20	2	(0)
- * Club domestic league appearances and goals

Ayman Foumou Kari (born 19 November 2004) is a French former professional footballer who played as a midfielder.

Kari came through the ranks of Paris Saint-Germain, being named Titi d'Or as the club's best youth player in 2021. He played in Ligue 1 with Lorient from January 2023 to June 2024 in successive loan spells. Although initially hailed as a promising player, he retired in 2025 at the age of 21.

== Early life ==
Born in Ivry-sur-Seine, Île-de-France, Kari first played youth club football in Villejuif. He then joined the Paris Saint-Germain Youth Academy in 2017, after spending two years in the pre-academy with the club.

== Club career ==
Having started playing with the under-19 side of Paris Saint-Germain (PSG) in the summer of 2021, impressing both in the Championnat National U19 and the UEFA Youth League, Kari was voted Titi d'Or in 2021, making him the best PSG youth player of that year, above the likes of Xavi Simons, Djeidi Gassama or Ismaël Gharbi. Kari extended his contract with PSG in July 2022, tying him to the club until 2024, after he was announced as a likely Bayern Munich signing.

On 5 January 2023, Kari signed his first professional contract with PSG, a deal until 30 June 2025. On 31 January, he was loaned out to fellow Ligue 1 club Lorient until the end of the season with an option for a one-year extension. Although the deal also included an option-to-buy for Lorient, according to various media reports, PSG secured a buy-back clause in the case of Kari being sold. On 30 April 2023, Kari made his professional debut as a substitute in a 3–1 away win over PSG at the Parc des Princes. He returned on loan to Lorient for the 2023–24 season. On 28 January 2024, Kari scored his first professional goal in a 3–3 draw against Le Havre.

In July 2024, Kari returned to Paris Saint-Germain following his loan spell at Lorient. Although Luis Enrique meant to include him in his plans for the new season, he was reported to have shown up to pre-season eight to ten kilograms overweight. He was released from the club in July 2025. In December 2025, L'Équipe reported that Kari had provisionally retired from professional football.

== International career ==
Kari is a former youth international for France, having started playing with the under-18s in the autumn of 2021. He was also eligible to represent Comoros and Madagascar at international level.

== Style of play ==
A midfielder, Kari mainly played as a sentinelle, a deep-lying playmaker during his time under Zoumana Camara with PSG youth teams.

== Career statistics ==
As of match played 19 April 2024

Appearances and goals by club, season and competition
Club	Season	League			Cup		Total	
Club	Season	Division	Apps	Goals	Apps	Goals	Apps	Goals
Lorient B (loan)	2022–23	National 2	1	0	—		1	0
Lorient (loan)	2022–23	Ligue 1	5	0	0	0	5	0
Lorient (loan)	2023–24	Ligue 1	14	1	1	0	15	1
Lorient (loan)	Total		19	1	1	0	20	1
Career total			20	1	1	0	21	1

== Honours ==
Individual

- Titi d'Or: 2021
