= Romain Faivre =

French footballer (born 1998)

Personal information
- Full name: Romain Jordan Faivre
- Date of birth: 14 July 1998 (age 28)
- Place of birth: Asnières-sur-Seine, Hauts-de-Seine, France
- Height: 1.80 m (5 ft 11 in)
- Positions: Attacking midfielder; right midfielder

Team information
- Current team: Auxerre (on loan from Bournemouth)
- Number: 28

Youth career
- 2004–2007: Gennevilloise
- 2007–2014: Racing Club de France
- 2014–2017: Tours

Senior career*
Years	Team	Apps	(Gls)
2015–2017	Tours B	12	(1)
2017–2020	Monaco B	62	(9)
2018	Monaco	1	(0)
2020–2022	Brest	57	(13)
2022–2023	Lyon	24	(3)
2023	→ Lorient (loan)	16	(5)
2023–	Bournemouth	5	(0)
2023–2024	→ Lorient (loan)	17	(5)
2024–2025	→ Brest (loan)	20	(3)
2025–2026	→ Al Taawoun (loan)	5	(1)
2026–	→ Auxerre (loan)	10	(0)

International career
2020–2021	France U21	8	(2)
- * Club domestic league appearances and goals as of 20 May 2026

Romain Jordan Faivre (born 14 July 1998) is a French professional footballer who plays as an attacking midfielder or right midfielder for Ligue 1 club Auxerre, on loan from Premier League club Bournemouth.

== Club career ==
=== Monaco ===
On 12 February 2018, Faivre signed his first professional contract with Monaco. He made his professional debut in a 1–0 Coupe de la Ligue win over Lorient on 19 December 2018.

=== Brest ===
On 30 June 2020, Faivre joined Brest in a deal worth €650,000. He made his debut for the club in a 4–0 league loss to Nîmes on 23 August.

=== Lyon ===
On 31 January 2022, Faivre joined fellow Ligue 1 side Lyon on a contract until June 2026. The transfer fee paid to Brest was a reported €15 million, with a potential €2 million in bonuses. The Breton side also secured a 15% sell-on clause in the deal. On 4 March 2022, Faivre scored his first two goals for Lyon, the first brace of his career, in a 4–1 away win over Lorient.

==== Lorient (loan) ====
On 28 January 2023, Faivre joined Lorient on loan for the remainder of the 2022–23 season.

=== Bournemouth ===
On 13 July 2023, Lyon announced the sale of Faivre to Premier League club Bournemouth for €15 million plus 10% of a potential future transfer. Bournemouth announced that the player had signed a long-term contract, and would spend the 2023–24 season on loan at feeder club Lorient.

==== Lorient (second loan) ====
On 13 July 2023, Lorient announced the signing of Faivre on a season-long loan deal, without an option to buy. He was recalled by Bournemouth on 30 January 2024.

==== Auxerre (loan) ====
On 16 January 2026, Faivre joined Ligue 1 side Auxerre on loan until the end of the season.

== Personal life ==
Born in France, Faivre is of Algerian descent through his mother.

== Career statistics ==
As of match played 16 March 2025

Appearances and goals by club, season and competition
Club	Season	League			National cup (Note: Includes Coupe de France, FA Cup)		League cup (Note: Includes Coupe de la Ligue)		Europe		Total	
Club	Season	Division	Apps	Goals	Apps	Goals	Apps	Goals	Apps	Goals	Apps	Goals
Monaco	2018–19	Ligue 1	1	0	1	0	2	0	0	0	4	0
Monaco	2019–20	Ligue 1	0	0	0	0	0	0	—		0	0
Monaco	Total		1	0	1	0	2	0	0	0	4	0
Brest	2020–21	Ligue 1	36	6	1	0	—		—		37	6
Brest	2021–22	Ligue 1	21	7	1	1	—		—		22	8
Brest	Total		57	13	2	1	0	0	—		59	14
Lyon	2021–22	Ligue 1	14	3	—		—		4 (Note: Appearances in UEFA Europa League)	0	18	3
Lyon	2022–23	Ligue 1	10	0	0	0	—		—		10	0
Lyon	Total		24	3	0	0	—		4	0	28	3
Lorient (loan)	2022–23	Ligue 1	16	5	1	0	—		—		17	5
Bournemouth	2023–24	Premier League	5	0	1	0	—		—		6	0
Lorient (loan)	2023–24	Ligue 1	17	5	0	0	—		—		17	5
Brest (loan)	2024–25	Ligue 1	19	3	2	0	—		8 (Note: Appearances in UEFA Champions League)	0	29	3
Career total			139	29	7	1	2	0	12	0	150	30
