= Gédéon Kalulu =

Footballer (born 1997)

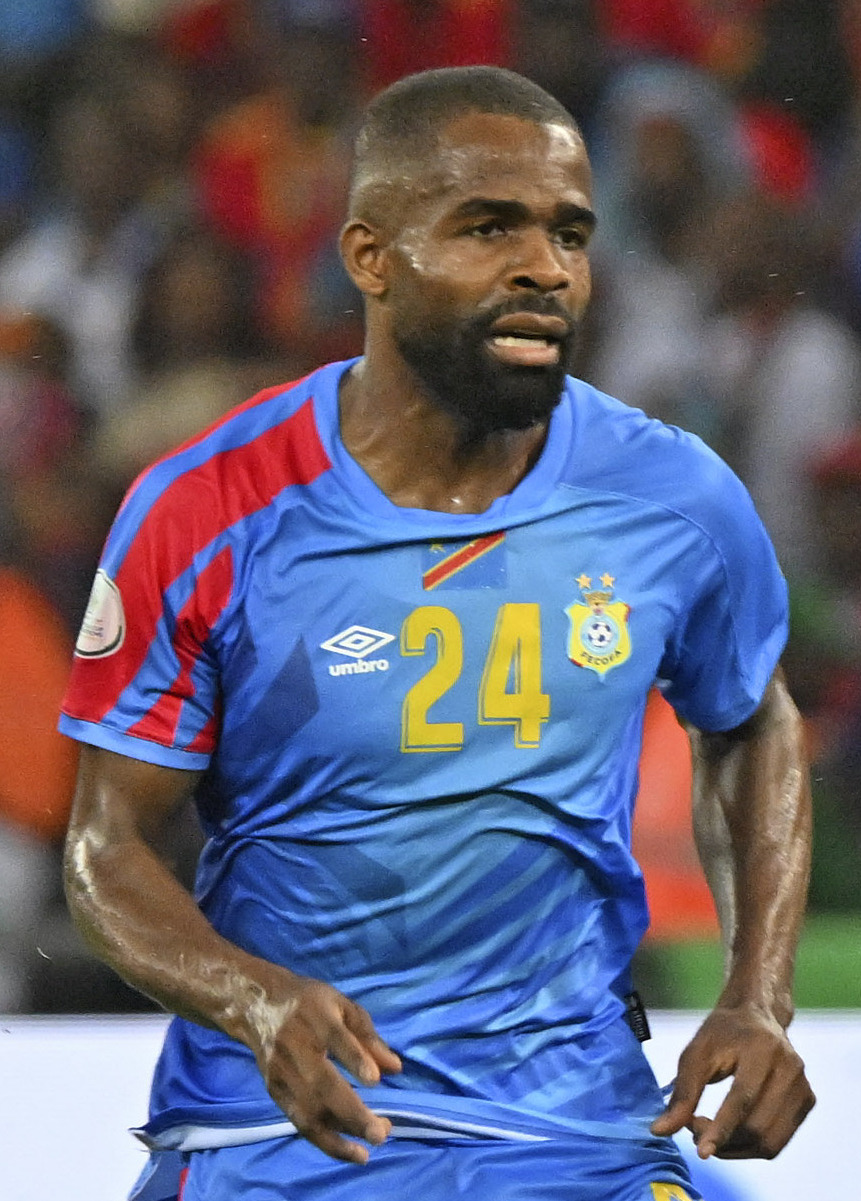
- Kalulu playing for DR Congo at the 2023 Africa Cup of Nations

Personal information
- Full name: Gédéon Tshingoma Kalulu Kyatengwa
- Date of birth: 29 August 1997 (age 29)
- Place of birth: Lyon, France
- Height: 1.79 m (5 ft 10 in)
- Position: Right-back

Team information
- Current team: Aris Limassol
- Number: 24

Youth career
- 2002–2007: CO Saint-Fons
- 2007–2013: Lyon
- 2013–2014: Saint-Priest
- 2014–2015: Lyon

Senior career*
| Years | Team | Apps | (Gls) |
| 2015–2019 | Lyon B | 49 | (3) |
| 2018–2019 | → Bourg-en-Bresse (loan) | 19 | (1) |
| 2019–2022 | Ajaccio | 85 | (1) |
| 2022–2025 | Lorient | 68 | (0) |
| 2025– | Aris Limassol | 21 | (0) |

International career^{‡}
| 2020– | DR Congo | 30 | (0) |
- * Club domestic league appearances and goals as of 20 September 2026 ‡ National team caps and goals as of 2 October 2026

Gédéon Tshingoma Kalulu Kyatengwa (born 29 August 1997) is a professional footballer who plays as a right-back for Cypriot club Aris Limassol. Born in France, he plays for the DR Congo national team.

== Early life ==
Kalulu was born in the 8th arrondissement of Lyon, France, and is Congolese by descent. His father was born in Kabimba, Belgian Congo, and his mother in Likasi, Congo-Léopoldville. He acquired French nationality on 26 December 2000 through the collective effect of his parents' naturalization.

== Club career ==
A youth product of Lyon, Kalulu signed his first professional contract with the club on 19 April 2017. After a season on loan with Bourg-en-Bresse, Kalulu signed with Ajaccio on 24 July 2019. He made his debut for Ajaccio in a 4–1 Coupe de la Ligue win over Valenciennes on 13 August 2019.

On 3 June 2022, Kalulu signed a four-year contract with Lorient.

On 18 August 2025, Kalulu joined Aris Limassol in Cyprus on a three-year contract.

== International career ==
On 22 September 2020, Kalulu was called-up by the DR Congo. On 13 October 2020, he debuted for DR Congo in a 1–1 friendly tie with Morocco.

On 27 December 2023, he was selected from the list of 24 Congolese players selected by Sébastien Desabre to compete in the 2023 Africa Cup of Nations.

On May 19, 2026, he was included in the 26-man squad selected by head coach Sébastien Desabre to represent the DR Congo at the 2026 FIFA World Cup.

== Personal life ==
He is the brother of fellow professional footballers Nantong Zhiyun forward Aldo and FC Juventus defender Pierre Kalulu, as well as Pau FC left-back Joseph Kalulu.

== Career statistics ==
=== Club ===
As of match played 20 September 2026

Appearances and goals by club, season and competition
| Club | Season | League | | | National Cup | | League Cup | | Europe | | Other | | Total | |
| Club | Season | Division | Apps | Goals | Apps | Goals | Apps | Goals | Apps | Goals | Apps | Goals | Apps | Goals |
|---|---|---|---|---|---|---|---|---|---|---|---|---|---|---|
| Lyon B | 2013–14 | CFA | 3 | 0 | — | | — | | — | | — | | 3 | 0 |
| Lyon B | 2014–15 | CFA | 1 | 0 | — | | — | | — | | — | | 1 | 0 |
| Lyon B | 2016–17 | CFA | 21 | 0 | — | | — | | — | | — | | 21 | 0 |
| Lyon B | 2017–18 | National 2 | 23 | 3 | — | | — | | — | | — | | 23 | 3 |
| Lyon B | 2018–19 | National 2 | 1 | 0 | — | | — | | — | | — | | 1 | 0 |
| Lyon B | Total | | 49 | 3 | — | | — | | — | | — | | 49 | 3 |
| Bourg-en-Bresse (loan) | 2018–19 | National | 19 | 1 | 2 | 0 | — | | — | | — | | 21 | 1 |
| Ajaccio | 2019–20 | Ligue 2 | 19 | 1 | 0 | 0 | 1 | 0 | — | | — | | 20 | 1 |
| Ajaccio | 2020–21 | Ligue 2 | 34 | 0 | 2 | 0 | — | | — | | — | | 36 | 0 |
| Ajaccio | 2021–22 | Ligue 2 | 32 | 0 | 1 | 0 | — | | — | | — | | 33 | 0 |
| Ajaccio | Total | | 85 | 1 | 3 | 0 | 1 | 0 | — | | — | | 89 | 1 |
| Lorient | 2022–23 | Ligue 1 | 29 | 0 | 0 | 0 | — | | — | | — | | 21 | 0 |
| Lorient | 2023–24 | Ligue 1 | 19 | 0 | 1 | 0 | — | | — | | — | | 11 | 0 |
| Lorient | 2024–25 | Ligue 2 | 20 | 0 | 2 | 0 | — | | — | | — | | 22 | 0 |
| Lorient | Total | | 68 | 0 | 3 | 0 | — | | — | | — | | 110 | 0 |
| Aris Limassol | 2025–26 | Cypriot First Division | 17 | 0 | 2 | 0 | — | | — | | — | | 19 | 0 |
| Aris Limassol | 2026–27 | Cypriot First Division | 4 | 0 | 0 | 0 | — | | — | | — | | 4 | 0 |
| Aris Limassol | Total | | 21 | 0 | 2 | 0 | — | | — | | — | | 23 | 0 |
| Career total | | | 242 | 5 | 10 | 0 | 1 | 0 | 0 | 0 | 0 | 0 | 253 | 5 |

=== International ===
As of match played 2 October 2026

Appearances and goals by national team and year
| National team | Year | Apps | Goals |
|---|---|---|---|
| DR Congo | 2020 | 1 | 0 |
| DR Congo | 2021 | 1 | 0 |
| DR Congo | 2022 | 1 | 0 |
| DR Congo | 2023 | 4 | 0 |
| DR Congo | 2024 | 13 | 0 |
| DR Congo | 2025 | 6 | 0 |
| DR Congo | 2026 | 4 | 0 |
| Total | | 30 | 0 |

== Honours ==
Lorient

- Ligue 2: 2024–25
