= Julien Ponceau =

French footballer (born 2000)

Personal information
- Date of birth: 28 November 2000 (age 25)
- Place of birth: Catumbela, Angola
- Height: 1.70 m (5 ft 7 in)
- Position: Midfielder

Team information
- Current team: Valladolid
- Number: 21

Youth career
- 2006–2013: US Saint-Évarzec
- 2013–2015: US Concarnoise
- 2015–2018: Lorient

Senior career*
Years	Team	Apps	(Gls)
2017–2020	Lorient II	41	(1)
2018–2025	Lorient	119	(9)
2020–2021	→ Rodez II (loan)	2	(1)
2020–2021	→ Rodez (loan)	16	(0)
2021–2022	→ Nîmes (loan)	38	(3)
2025–	Valladolid	37	(1)

International career^{‡}
2018	France U18	3	(0)
2018–2019	France U19	12	(0)
2019	France U20	1	(0)
- * Club domestic league appearances and goals as of 9 June 2026 ‡ National team caps and goals as of 22:58, 11 February 2021 (UTC)

Julien Ponceau (born 28 November 2000) is a professional footballer who plays as a midfielder for Segunda División club Valladolid. Born in Angola, Ponceau is a youth international for France.

== Club career ==
=== Lorient ===
Ponceau is a product of Lorient's youth academy, having joined in 2015. On 14 February 2018, Ponceau signed his first professional contract with Lorient, keeping him at the club until 2020. He made his professional debut in a 1–0 Coupe de la Ligue win over Valenciennes on 14 August 2018.

==== Loan to Rodez ====
On 5 October 2020, Ponceau extended his contract with Lorient until 2023, and signed for Rodez on loan until the end of the 2020–21 season.

==== Loan to Nîmes ====
In July 2021, Ponceau moved on a new loan to Nîmes.

=== Valladolid ===
On 19 July 2025, Ponceau signed a three-year contract with Spanish Segunda División side Valladolid.

== Personal life ==
Ponceau was born in Angola to a French father and Angolan mother, and moved to France at a young age.

== Career statistics ==
As of match played 10 May 2025

Appearances and goals by club, season and competition
Club	Season	League			Cup		League Cup		Other		Total	
Club	Season	Division	Apps	Goals	Apps	Goals	Apps	Goals	Apps	Goals	Apps	Goals
Lorient II	2016–17	CFA	1	0	—		—		—		1	0
Lorient II	2017–18	National 2	23	0	—		—		—		23	0
Lorient II	2018–19	National 2	4	0	—		—		—		4	0
Lorient II	2019–20	National 2	13	1	—		—		—		13	1
Lorient II	Total		41	1	—		—		—		41	0
Lorient	2018–19	Ligue 2	24	2	0	0	4	0	—		28	2
Lorient	2019–20	Ligue 2	2	0	2	0	1	0	—		5	0
Lorient	2022–23	Ligue 1	31	1	3	0	—		—		34	1
Lorient	2023–24	Ligue 1	32	3	1	0	—		—		33	3
Lorient	2024–25	Ligue 2	30	3	2	1	—		—		32	4
Lorient	Total		119	9	8	1	5	0	—		132	10
Rodez II (loan)	2020–21	National 3	2	1	—		—		—		2	1
Rodez (loan)	2020–21	Ligue 2	16	0	2	0	—		—		18	0
Nîmes (loan)	2021–22	Ligue 2	38	3	3	1	—		—		41	4
Career total			216	14	13	2	5	0	0	0	234	16

== Honours ==
Lorient

- Ligue 2: 2019–20, 2024–25
