= Vincent Le Goff =

French footballer (born 1989)

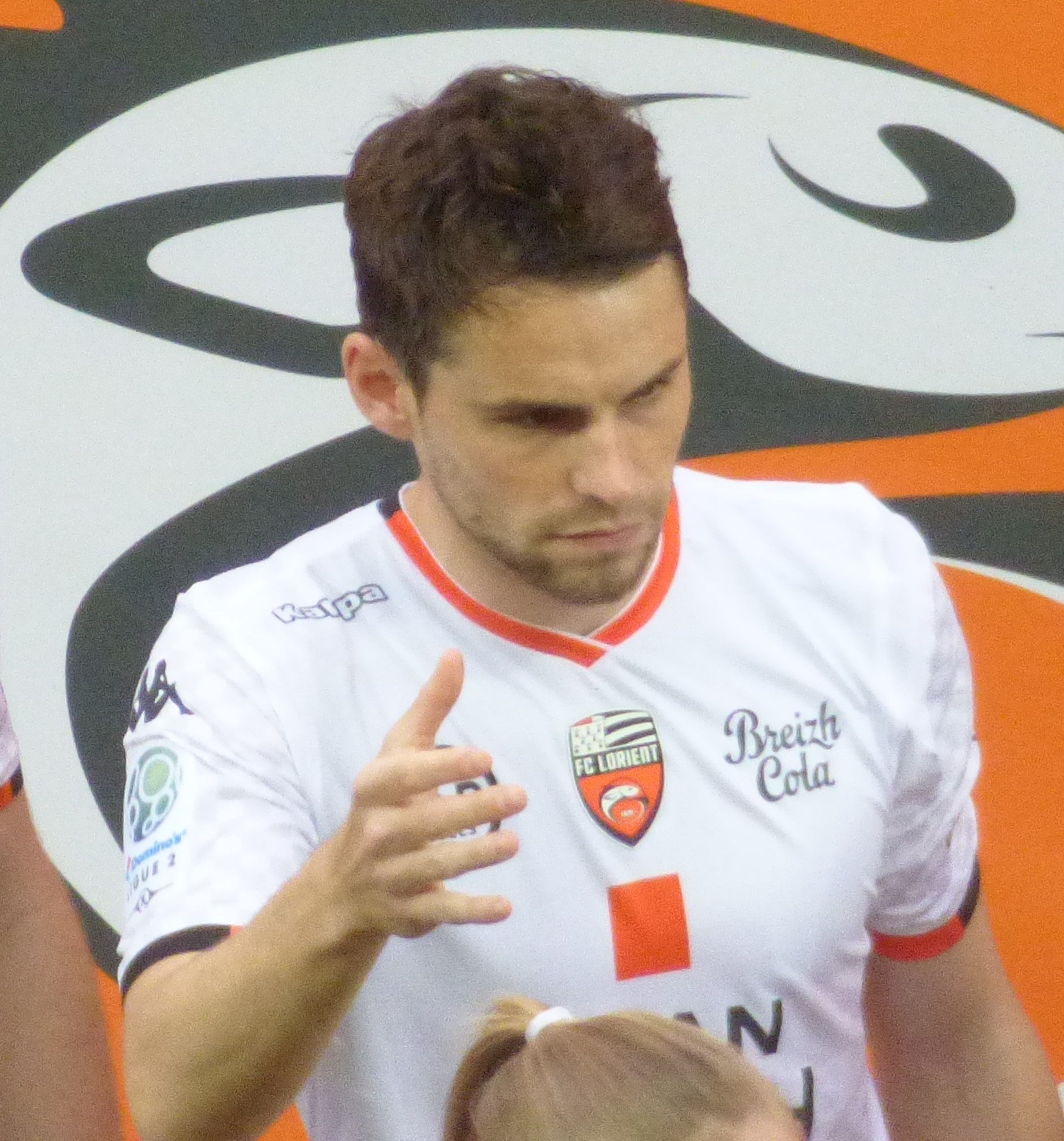
- Le Goff in 2019

Personal information
- Date of birth: 15 October 1989 (age 37)
- Place of birth: Quimper, France
- Height: 1.77 m (5 ft 10 in)
- Position: Left-back

Youth career
- 2004–2009: Nantes

Senior career*
Years	Team	Apps	(Gls)
2009–2010	Laval	2	(0)
2010–2011	La Vitréenne	32	(7)
2011–2013	Le Poiré-sur-Vie	59	(1)
2013–2014	Istres	38	(2)
2014–2024	Lorient	301	(10)
2014	Lorient B	2	(0)
Total		434	(20)
- * Club domestic league appearances and goals

Vincent Le Goff (born 15 October 1989) is a French former professional footballer who played as a left-back.
