= Stéphane Diarra =

Ivorian footballer (born 1998)

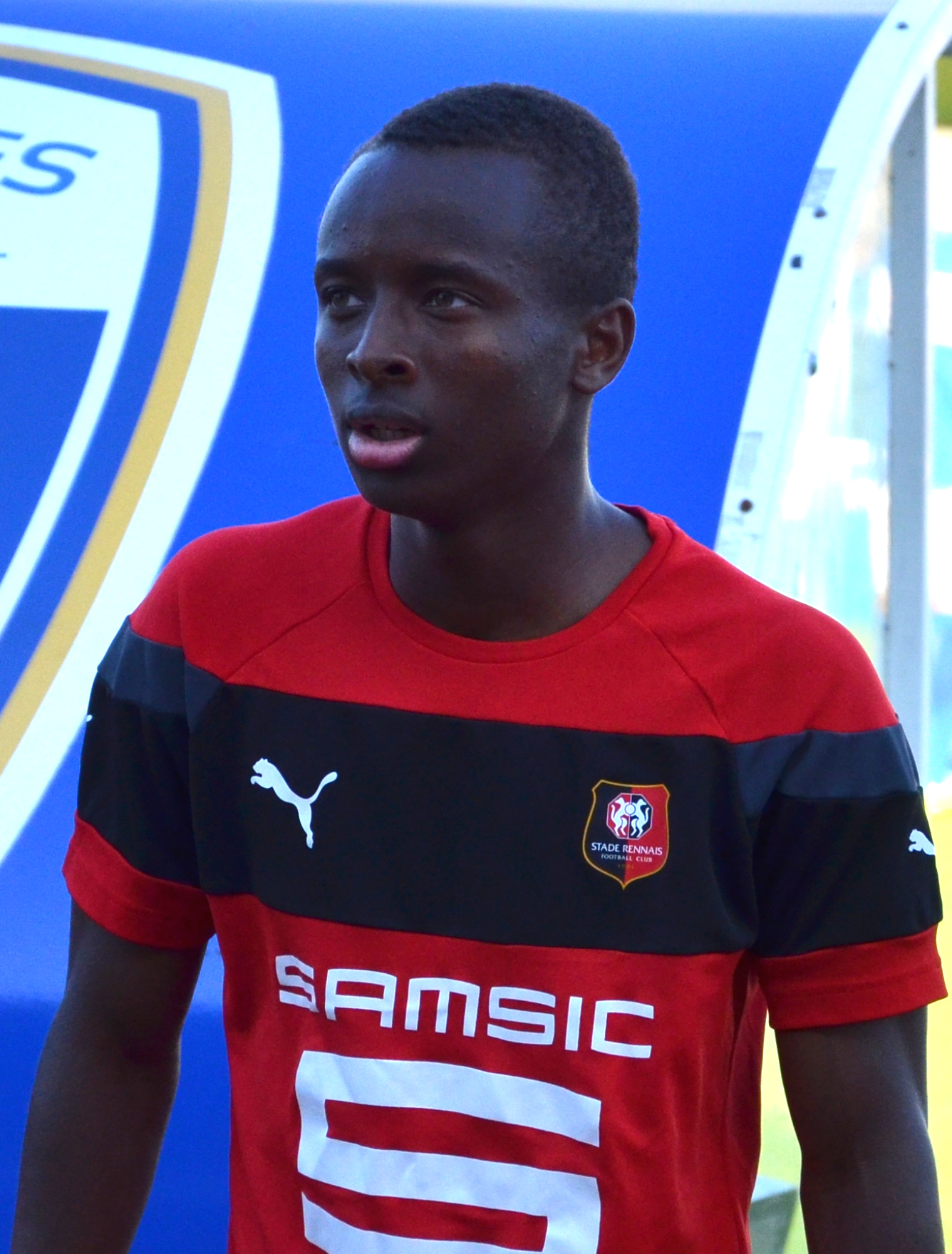
- Diarra with Rennes in 2016

Personal information
- Full name: Stéphane Imad Diarra
- Date of birth: 9 December 1998 (age 27)
- Place of birth: Abidjan, Ivory Coast
- Height: 1.73 m (5 ft 8 in)
- Position: Winger

Team information
- Current team: União de Santarém (on loan from Alverca)
- Number: 7

Youth career
- Évian

Senior career*
| Years | Team | Apps | (Gls) |
| 2016 | Évian | 6 | (0) |
| 2016–2019 | Rennes | 0 | (0) |
| 2016–2019 | Rennes B | 27 | (0) |
| 2018–2019 | → Le Mans (loan) | 31 | (3) |
| 2019–2020 | Le Mans | 23 | (3) |
| 2020–2025 | Lorient | 59 | (2) |
| 2023–2024 | → Saint-Étienne (loan) | 11 | (0) |
| 2024–2025 | Lorient B | 4 | (0) |
| 2025– | Alverca | 2 | (0) |
| 2026– | → União de Santarém (loan) | 1 | (0) |
- * Club domestic league appearances and goals as of 12 September 2026

Stéphane Diarra (born 9 December 1998) is an Ivorian professional footballer who plays as a winger for Portuguese Liga 3 club União de Santarém on loan from Alverca.

== Career ==
Diarra made his senior debut for Évian during the 2015–16 Ligue 2 season, and then joined Rennes in July 2016. He spent the 2018–19 season on loan at Le Mans, helped them gain promotion to Ligue 2 via the play-offs, and joined them on a three-year contract in June 2019.

In summer 2020, Diarra moved to FC Lorient, newly promoted to Ligue 1, on a five-year contract. The transfer fee paid to Le Mans was reported as €3 million.

On 21 August 2023, Diarra joined Saint-Étienne on a season-long loan.

On 16 July 2025, Diarra signed with Alverca in Portugal.

== Personal life ==
Born in Abidjan, Ivory Coast, he holds both Ivorian and French nationalities.

== Career statistics ==
As of match played 12 April 2025

Appearances and goals by club, season and competition
| Club | Season | League | | | National cup | | League cup | | Other | | Total | |
| Club | Season | Division | Apps | Goals | Apps | Goals | Apps | Goals | Apps | Goals | Apps | Goals |
|---|---|---|---|---|---|---|---|---|---|---|---|---|
| Évian | 2015–16 | Ligue 2 | 6 | 0 | 0 | 0 | 0 | 0 | — | | 6 | 0 |
| Rennes B | 2016–17 | CFA | 11 | 0 | — | | — | | — | | 11 | 0 |
| Rennes B | 2017–18 | National 2 | 16 | 0 | — | | — | | — | | 16 | 0 |
| Rennes B | Total | | 27 | 0 | 0 | 0 | 0 | 0 | 0 | 0 | 27 | 0 |
| Le Mans (loan) | 2018–19 | National | 31 | 3 | 3 | 2 | — | | 2 | 0 | 36 | 5 |
| Le Mans | 2019–20 | Ligue 2 | 23 | 3 | 1 | 0 | 4 | 1 | — | | 28 | 4 |
| Lorient | 2020–21 | Ligue 1 | 13 | 0 | 1 | 0 | — | | — | | 14 | 0 |
| Lorient | 2021–22 | Ligue 1 | 15 | 0 | 1 | 0 | — | | — | | 16 | 0 |
| Lorient | 2022–23 | Ligue 1 | 28 | 2 | 2 | 1 | — | | — | | 30 | 3 |
| Lorient | 2024–25 | Ligue 2 | 3 | 0 | 3 | 0 | — | | — | | 6 | 0 |
| Lorient | Total | | 59 | 2 | 7 | 1 | 0 | 0 | 0 | 0 | 66 | 3 |
| Saint-Étienne (loan) | 2023–24 | Ligue 2 | 11 | 0 | 1 | 0 | — | | — | | 12 | 0 |
| Lorient B | 2024–25 | National 3 | 4 | 0 | — | | — | | — | | 4 | 0 |
| Career total | | | 161 | 8 | 12 | 3 | 4 | 1 | 2 | 0 | 179 | 12 |

== Honours ==
Lorient

- Ligue 2: 2024–25
