= Théo Le Bris =

French footballer (born 2002)

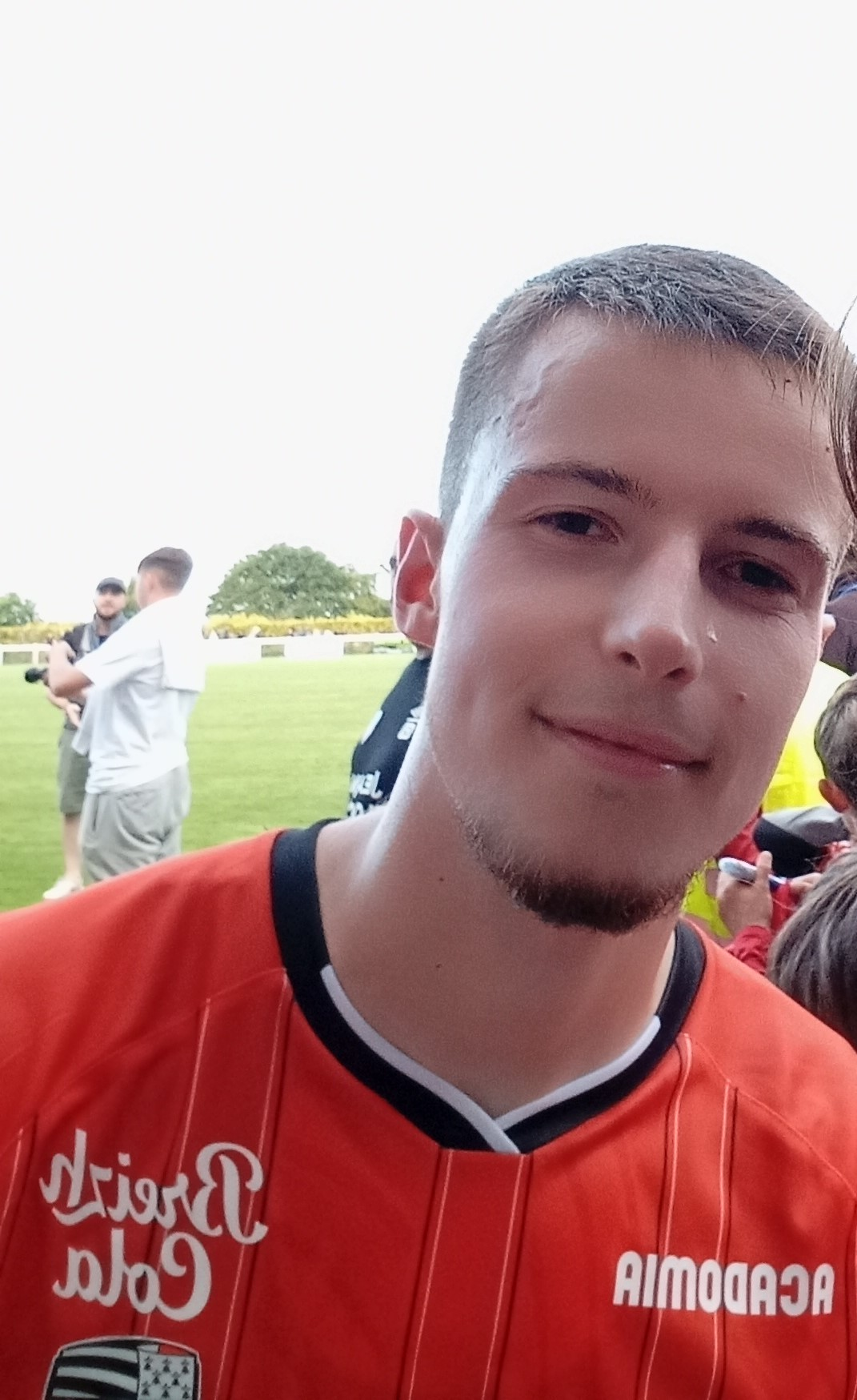

Personal information
- Date of birth: 1 October 2002 (age 24)
- Place of birth: Rennes, France
- Height: 1.65 m (5 ft 5 in)
- Positions: Right-back; midfielder

Team information
- Current team: Lorient
- Number: 11

Youth career
- 2008–2013: US Montgermont
- 2013–2017: CPB Brequigny Rennes
- 2017–2019: Lorient

Senior career*
Years	Team	Apps	(Gls)
2019–2024	Lorient II	39	(2)
2021–	Lorient	96	(4)
2025	→ Guingamp (loan)	10	(2)

International career
2022	France U20	1	(0)
- * Club domestic league appearances and goals as of 19 May 2026

Théo Le Bris (born 1 October 2002) is a French professional footballer who plays as a right-back or midfielder for Ligue 1 club Lorient.

== Club career ==
A youth product of Lorient, Le Bris began his senior career with their reserves, and started training with their first team in 2021. He made his professional debut with Lorient in a 2–1 Ligue 1 win over Lille on 10 September 2021.

On 3 February 2025, Le Bris was loaned by Guingamp in Ligue 2.

== Personal life ==
Théo was born in a family of footballers; his father Benoît and uncle Régis, who was his manager at Lorient, were professional footballers in France.

== Honours ==
Lorient

- Ligue 2: 2024–25
