= Régis Le Bris =

French football manager and former player (born 1975)

- Le Bris in 2026

Personal information
- Date of birth: 6 December 1975 (age 50)
- Place of birth: Pont-l'Abbé, Finistère, France
- Position: Centre-back

Team information
- Current team: Sunderland (head coach)

Youth career
- –1987: US Plonéour
- 1987–19??: AS Ergué-Armel
- 19??–1991: Quimper
- 1991–1994: Rennes

Senior career*
Years	Team	Apps	(Gls)
1993–1999	Rennes B	109	(2)
1994–1999	Rennes	31	(0)
1999–2002	Laval	52	(0)
2002–2003	KSK Ronse	5	(0)
Total		197	(2)

International career
1990–1991	France U15	2	(0)
1991–1992	France U16	3	(0)
1992–1993	France U17	5	(0)

Managerial career
- 2015–2022: Lorient B
- 2022–2024: Lorient
- 2024–: Sunderland
- * Club domestic league appearances and goals

Régis Le Bris (born 6 December 1975) is a French professional football manager and former player who is currently the head coach of Premier League club Sunderland.

== Early life and club career ==
Le Bris was born on 6 December 1975 in Pont-l'Abbé, a commune in the Finistère department. He first began playing youth football for local side US Plonéour, before joining AS Ergué-Armel at the age of 12, and later Quimper.

In 1991, he joined the youth ranks of Rennes, where he would play primarily with the B team, but with whom he would also make his senior debut in 1994 and sign his first professional contract at the age of 21. Le Bris made a total of 31 Division 1 appearances for Rennes, across five seasons with the first team.

In April 1999, despite still having two years left on his contract at Rennes, Le Bris opted to join nearby Division 2 side Laval, signing a three-year deal with the club and joining up with previous teammates Ulrich Le Pen and Mickaël Buzaré. Le Bris struggled for consistent game time at Laval, only making a total of 52 league appearances across three seasons with the club, though it was there that he would meet future friend and colleague Franck Haise.

Le Bris played his last professional football with Belgian second division side KSK Ronse, retiring in 2003 to focus on youth coaching.

== International career ==
Le Bris played in multiple different France youth representative sides, including representing the France under-16 team at the 1991 Montaigu Tournament.

== Managerial career ==
=== Rennes and Lorient ===
Le Bris became a certified sports coach in 2004, and started his managerial career as a youth coach for Wasquehal, before joining the youth sector of Rennes in the same role. During his stint with the club's under-19 squad, he led the team to the victory of the Championnat National U19 in 2007, before winning the Coupe Gambardella the following year.

In July 2012, after rejecting an offer to renew his contract with Rennes, Le Bris was appointed as the head of youth development at Lorient. He also served as the coach of the under-17 squad, with whom he would win the Championnat National U17 with in 2015, before being appointed as the manager of the club's reserve team later the same year. While serving in the role, he coached several footballers who would go on to play for the first team, including Mattéo Guendouzi, Illan Meslier, Alexis Claude-Maurice and Enzo Le Fée.

In May 2022, Le Bris obtained a professional coaching licence; on 27 June of the same year, he was appointed as the head coach of Lorient's first team, signing a three-year contract. In his first season at the club, he led the team to a tenth-place finish in Ligue 1; in March 2023, he extended his contract with Lorient until 2027. Following their relegation to the Ligue 2 at the end of the 2023–24 campaign, Le Bris officially left the club by mutual consent on 22 June 2024.

=== Sunderland ===
On 22 June 2024, it was announced that Le Bris would be appointed as the head coach of EFL Championship club Sunderland on 1 July, signing a three-year contract in the process. Under Le Bris, the club started off strongly, reaching an unbeaten record in the first month of the season and scoring ten goals while conceding only one; Le Bris was thus awarded the EFL Championship Manager of the Month for August. Le Bris ultimately guided Sunderland back to the Premier League after an eight year absence, winning the play-off final 2–1 against Sheffield United on 24 May 2025. In the 2025–26 season, Le Bris guided Sunderland to a seventh-place finish in the league, securing qualification for the 2026–27 UEFA Europa League.

== Personal life ==
Le Bris is the brother of fellow former footballer Benoît Le Bris, as well as the uncle of Théo Le Bris, whom he managed at Lorient.

In 2006, he obtained a doctorate in sport physiology and biomechanics at Rennes 2 University, having presented a study on accelerometer-based running as his thesis. He graduated with a diplôme universitaire (DU) in the mental training of high-level athletes, from the same university in 2010.

== Managerial statistics ==
As of match played 21 November 2026

Managerial record by team and tenure
Team	From	To	Record					Ref.
Team	From	To	P	W	D	L	Win %	Ref.
Lorient	27 June 2022	22 June 2024	76	23	20	33	30.3	
Sunderland	1 July 2024	Present	110	44	32	34	40.0	
Total			186	67	52	67	36.0	

== Honours ==
Sunderland

- EFL Championship play-offs: 2025

Individual

- EFL Championship Manager of the Month: August 2024, October 2024
