= 2024–25 FC Lorient season =

FC Lorient
2024–25 season
- Head coach: Olivier Pantaloni
- Stadium: Stade du Moustoir
- Ligue 2: 1st (promoted)
- Coupe de France: Round of 32
- Top goalscorer: League: Eli Junior Kroupi (22); All: Eli Junior Kroupi (23)

The 2024–25 season was the 98th season in the history of Football Club Lorient, and the club's first season back in Ligue 2. In addition to the domestic league, the club participated in the Coupe de France.

== Players ==
=== First-team squad ===
As of 28 April 2025

Note: Flags indicate national team as defined under FIFA eligibility rules; some limited exceptions apply. Players may hold more than one non-FIFA nationality.

No.	Pos.	Nation	Player
1	GK	FRA	Benjamin Leroy
2	DF	BRA	Igor Silva
3	DF	TUN	Montassar Talbi
5	DF	SEN	Formose Mendy
6	MF	FRA	Laurent Abergel (captain)
7	MF	CIV	Stéphane Diarra
9	FW	CIV	Mohamed Bamba
10	FW	FRA	Pablo Pagis
15	DF	FRA	Julien Laporte
17	MF	FRA	Jean-Victor Makengo
21	MF	FRA	Julien Ponceau
22	FW	FRA	Eli Junior Kroupi (on loan from Bournemouth)
24	DF	COD	Gédéon Kalulu

No.	Pos.	Nation	Player
27	FW	BEN	Aiyegun Tosin
28	FW	SEN	Sambou Soumano
30	GK	FRA	Gaël Alette
32	DF	GHA	Nathaniel Adjei
38	GK	SUI	Yvon Mvogo
44	DF	CMR	Darlin Yongwa
62	MF	CMR	Arthur Avom
66	DF	NGR	Isaac James
75	MF	FRA	Bandiougou Fadiga
77	DF	GRE	Panos Katseris
93	MF	NOR	Joel Mvuka
99	FW	SEN	Bassirou N'Diaye

=== Out on loan ===
Note: Flags indicate national team as defined under FIFA eligibility rules; some limited exceptions apply. Players may hold more than one non-FIFA nationality.

No.	Pos.	Nation	Player
—	DF	GUI	Dembo Sylla (on loan at Dender)
—	DF	FRA	Isaak Touré (on loan at Udinese)
—	MF	FRA	Théo Le Bris (on loan at Guingamp)

No.	Pos.	Nation	Player
—	FW	FRA	Yoann Cathline (on loan at Utrecht)
—	FW	SEN	Bamba Dieng (on loan at Angers)
—	FW	MLI	Siriné Doucouré (on loan at Laval)

== Transfers ==
=== Out ===
Pos.	Player	Transferred to	Fee	Date	Source
MF	(Algeria) Badredine Bouanani	(France) Nice	Loan return	30 June 2024	
MF	(Morocco) Imran Louza	(England) Watford	Loan return	30 June 2024	
MF	(France) Quentin Boisgard	(Cyprus) Apollon Limassol	End of contract	1 July 2024	
MF	(France) Taofeek Ismaheel	(Poland) Górnik Zabrze	Undisclosed	17 July 2024	
MF	(France) Yoann Cathline	(Netherlands) FC Utrecht	Loan	23 July 2024	

== Friendlies ==
=== Pre-season ===
13 July 2024 Friendly	Lorient (France)	0–0	(France) US Concarneau
18:00

20 July 2024 Friendly	Lorient (France)	1–1	(France) Brest	Inzinzac-Lochrist
17:00	Yongwa (yellow card) 55'; Mouyokolo 78'; Innocent (yellow card) 81' (yellow-red card) 83'		Martin (yellow card) 28'; Camara (yellow card) 38'; Le Cardinal (yellow card) 43'; Le Douaron 45+2'; Dari (red card) 82'	Stadium: Stade de Mané-Braz

27 July 2024 Friendly	Le Havre (France)	0–1	(France) Lorient	Dinan
16:00
Note: Two periods of 30 minutes

27 July 2024 Friendly	Lorient (France)	0–2	(France) Guingamp	Dinan
18:45			Siwe 4'; Guendouz 30'
Note: Two periods of 30 minutes

== Competitions ==
=== Overall record ===
Competition	First match	Last match	Starting round	Record							
Competition	First match	Last match	Starting round	Pld	W	D	L	GF	GA	GD	Win %
Ligue 2	16–18 August 2024	10 May 2025	Matchday 1	0	0	0	0	0	0	+0	—
Coupe de France				0	0	0	0	0	0	+0	—
Total				0	0	0	0	0	0	+0	—

Source: Soccerway

=== Ligue 2 ===
==== League table ====
Pos	Team	Pld	W	D	L	GF	GA	GD	Pts	Promotion or Relegation
1	Lorient (C, P)	34	22	5	7	68	31	+37	71	Promotion to Ligue 1
2	Paris FC (P)	34	21	6	7	55	33	+22	69	Promotion to Ligue 1
3	Metz (O, P)	34	18	11	5	63	34	+29	65	Qualification for promotion play-offs final
4	Dunkerque	34	17	5	12	47	40	+7	56	Qualification for promotion play-offs semi-final
5	Guingamp	34	17	4	13	57	45	+12	55	Qualification for promotion play-offs semi-final

Source: Ligue 2
Rules for classification: 1) Points; 2) Goal difference; 3) Number of goals scored; 4) Head-to-head goal difference; 5) Fair play points
(C) Champions; (O) Play-off winners; (P) Promoted

==== Results summary ====
Overall								Home						Away					
Pld	W	D	L	GF	GA	GD	Pts	W	D	L	GF	GA	GD	W	D	L	GF	GA	GD
28	18	4	6	51	27	+24	58	12	1	1	35	11	+24	6	3	5	16	16	0

Last updated: 29 March 2025.
Source: soccerway

===== Results by round =====
Round	1	2	3	4	5	6	7	8	9	10	11	12	13	14	15	16	17	18	19	20	21	22	23	24	25	26	27	28	29	30	31	32	33	34
Ground	A	H	A	H	A	A	H	A	H	A	H	A	H	A	H	H	A	H	A	H	A	H	A	H	H	A	H	A	H	A	A	H	A	H
Result	W	W	L	W	D	L	W	W	W	D	W	L	W	D	W	W	L	D	W	W	W	W	W	L	W	L	W	W						
Position	7	3	5	3	4	10	4	2	2	2	2	2	2	3	2	1	1	1	1	1	1	1	1	1	1	1	1	1						

Updated to match(es) played on 29 March 2025. Source: worldfootball
A = Away; H = Home; W = Win; D = Draw; L = Loss

==== Matches ====
The match schedule was released on 21 June 2024.

19 August 2024 1	Martigues	0-1	Lorient	Martigues
20:45 CET		Report	Dieng 61'	Stadium: Stade Francis-Turcan; Attendance: 2,655; Referee: (France) Olivier Thual

24 August 2024 2	Lorient	2-0	Grenoble Foot 38	Lorient
14:30 CET	Yongwa (yellow card) 17'; Kroupi 46'; Ponceau 68'	Report	Sylvestre (yellow card) 8'; Meïssa Ba (yellow card) 51'	Stadium: Stade du Moustoir - Yves Allainmat; Attendance: 10,798; Referee: (France) Faouzi Benchabane

31 August 2024 3	Amiens SC	1-0	Lorient	Amiens
14:30 CET	Bakayoko 37'	Report		Stadium: Stade de la Licorne; Attendance: 5,460; Referee: (France) Pierre Gaillouste

13 September 2024 4	Lorient	2-1	Red Star	Lorient
20:00 CET	Katseris 12'; Soumano 77' (pen.); Abergel (yellow card) 79'; Talbi (yellow card) 82'	Report	Benali (yellow card) 45+17'; Ifnaoui 47'; Badji (yellow card) 48'; Mbock (red card) 88'	Stadium: Stade du Moustoir - Yves Allainmat; Attendance: 5,748; Referee: (France) Pierre Legat

21 September 2024 5	Metz	1-1	Lorient	Longeville-lès-Metz
14:30 CET	Sabaly 27'; Kouao (yellow card) 53'; Udol (yellow card) 90+3'	Report	Abergel (yellow card) 68'; Mendy (yellow card) 78'; Bamba 85'	Stadium: Stade Saint-Symphorien; Attendance: 17,970; Referee: (France) Marc Bollengier

24 September 2024 6	Pau	1-0	Lorient	Bizanos
20:30 CET	Mboup 34'; Jordy Gaspar (yellow card) 45+1'	Report	Kalulu (yellow card) 33'; Talbi (red card) 40'	Stadium: Nouste Camp; Attendance: 3,054; Referee: (France) Aurélien Petit

27 September 2024 7	Lorient	3-0	Ajaccio	Lorient
20:00 CET	Isaac James (yellow card) 42'; Soumano (yellow card) 62'; Kroupi 69' 78'; Enzo Genton 90+2'	Report	Jabol-Folcarelli (red card) 16'; Mangani (yellow card) 42'; Anziani (yellow card) 83'	Stadium: Stade du Moustoir - Yves Allainmat; Attendance: 10,042; Referee: (France) Eddy Rosier

5 October 2024 8	Caen	1-2	Lorient	Caen
14:00 CET	Gomis 17'; Debohi (yellow card) 38'; Lecoeuche (yellow card) 49'	Report	Kroupi 35'; Bamba 87'	Stadium: Stade Michel d'Ornano; Attendance: 15,429; Referee: (France) Florent Batta

19 October 2024 9	Lorient	4-2	Annecy	Lorient
20:00 CET	Kroupi 55' (yellow card) 72' (goal) 74'; Mvuka 70'; Soumano 88'	Report	Djoco 7'; Escales (yellow card) 36'; Pajot (yellow card) 40'; Dago 90+2'	Stadium: Stade du Moustoir - Yves Allainmat; Attendance: 11,512; Referee: (France) Robin Chapapria

25 October 2024 10	Rodez	3-3	Lorient	Rodez
20:00 CET	Bouchouari 78'; Taïbi 89'; Mpasi 90+7'	Report	Kroupi 32'; Ponceau (yellow card) 34'; Talbi (yellow card) 51'; Mendy 56'; Soumano 85'	Stadium: Stade Paul-Lignon; Attendance: 4,751; Referee: (France) Thierry Bouille

29 October 2024 11	Lorient	4-2	Dunkerque	Lorient
20:30 CET	Mvuka 28'; Soumano 55' 85'; Tosin 83'	Report	Rivera 7' 44'; Diogo Queirós (yellow card) 18'; Opa Sanganté (yellow card) 49'; Sasso (yellow card) 90+1'; Anto Sekongo (red card) 90+3'	Stadium: Stade du Moustoir - Yves Allainmat; Attendance: 12,036; Referee: (France) Pierre Gaillouste

1 November 2024 12	Clermont	2-1	Lorient	Clermont-Ferrand
20:00 CET	Gastien (yellow card) 20'; Da Silva 45'; Douane 76'; Diallo (yellow card) 80'; Armougom (yellow card) 90+3'	Report	Abergel (yellow card) 17'; Isaac James (yellow card) 24'; Katseris (yellow card) 44'; Tosin 81' (pen.)	Stadium: Stade Gabriel-Montpied; Attendance: 5,423; Referee: (France) Mikael Lesage

9 November 2024 13	Lorient	3-1	Guingamp	Lorient
14:00 CET	Katseris 8'; Basilio 42' (o.g.); Soumano 68' (pen.)	Report	Louiserre 57' (pen.)	Stadium: Stade du Moustoir - Yves Allainmat; Attendance: 14,345; Referee: (France) Mickaël Leleu

23 November 2024 14	Bastia	0-0	Lorient	Furiani
20:00 CET	Zakaria Ariss (yellow card) 32'; Janneh (red card) 32'; Maggiotti (yellow card) 37'; Ducrocq (yellow card) 53'; Inao (yellow card) 61'; Roncaglia (red card) 90+5'	Report	Laporte (yellow card) 81'; Igor Silva (yellow card) 85'; Yongwa (yellow card) 89'	Stadium: Stade Armand-Cesari; Attendance: 9,513; Referee: (France) Willy Delajod

6 December 2024 15	Lorient	2-0	Troyes	Lorient
20:00 CET	Mvuka 29'; Pagis 71'	Report		Stadium: Stade du Moustoir - Yves Allainmat; Attendance: 11,141; Referee: (France) Karim Abed

14 December 2024 16	Lorient	2-0	Paris FC	Lorient
14:00 CET	Ponceau 13'; Abergel (yellow card) 44'; Katseris (yellow card) 63'; Soumano 90+7' (pen.)	Report	Marchetti (yellow card) 26' (yellow-red card) 84'; López (yellow card) 75'; Lopez (yellow card) 76'	Stadium: Stade du Moustoir - Yves Allainmat; Attendance: 13,963; Referee: (France) Guillaume Paradis

4 January 2025 17	Laval	2-0	Lorient	Laval
20:00 CET	Kouassi 67'; Roye (yellow card) 69'; Tchokounté 86'	Report	Talbi (yellow card) 66'	Stadium: Stade Francis Le Basser; Attendance: 7,146; Referee: (France) Geoffrey Kubler

11 January 2025 18	Lorient	0-0	Metz	Lorient
20:00 CET	Laporte (yellow card) 70'; Yongwa (yellow card) 74'; Ponceau (yellow card) 87'; Igor Silva (yellow card) 90+1'	Report	Van Den Kerkhof (yellow card) 88'	Stadium: Stade du Moustoir - Yves Allainmat; Attendance: 13,529; Referee: (France) Faouzi Benchabane

18 January 2025 19	Dunkerque	0-1	Lorient	Dunkerque
20:00 CET	Raghouber (yellow card) 52'	Report	Talbi 14'; Makengo (yellow card) 23'; Arthur Avom (yellow card) 69'; Enzo Genton (yellow card) 81'	Stadium: Stade Marcel-Tribut; Attendance: 4,878; Referee: (France) Aurélien Petit

25 January 2025 20	Lorient	3–2	Clermont	Lorient
20:00 CET	Laporte 24'; Kroupi 30' (pen.); Pagis 59'	Report	Jacquet 12' (yellow card) 90+9'; Ndiaye (yellow card) 28'; Gastien (yellow card) 28'; Bassouamina 90+4'	Stadium: Stade du Moustoir - Yves Allainmat; Attendance: 11,238; Referee: (France) Pierre Legat

1 February 2025 21	Red Star	1–2	Lorient	Saint-Ouen-sur-Seine
14:00 CET	Badji 66'	Report	Kroupi 24'; Pagis (yellow card) 26'; Arthur Avom 57'	Stadium: Stade Bauer; Attendance: 4,633; Referee: (France) Guillaume Paradis

8 February 2025 22	Lorient	3–1	Amiens SC	Lorient
14:00 CET	Pagis 9'; Kroupi (yellow card) 45'; Soumano 83' 85'; Arthur Avom (yellow card) 84'	Report	Leautey 7'; Jaouab (yellow card) 74'	Stadium: Stade du Moustoir - Yves Allainmat; Attendance: 10,680; Referee: (France) Eddy Rosier

14 February 2025 23	Troyes	0–1	Lorient	Troyes
20:00 CET	Boura (yellow card) 22'	Report	Kroupi 72'	Stadium: Stade de l'Aube; Attendance: 4,973; Referee: (France) Mikael Lesage

22 February 2025 24	Lorient	0–1	Laval	Lorient
14:00 CET	Abergel (yellow card) 41'; Laporte (yellow card) 81'	Report	Christ-Owen Kouassi Bathele (yellow card) 44'; Thomas (yellow card) 58'; Sellouki (yellow card) 62'; Cherni 87' (yellow card) 87'	Stadium: Stade du Moustoir - Yves Allainmat; Attendance: 13,012; Referee: (France) Rémi Landry

1 March 2025 25	Lorient	3–1	Rodez	Lorient
20:00 CET	Katseris 45+2'; Kroupi 73' (pen.); Abergel 88'	Report	Bentayeb 27' (yellow card) 72'; Galves (yellow card) 79'	Stadium: Stade du Moustoir - Yves Allainmat; Attendance: 11,599; Referee: (France) Mikael Lesage

8 March 2025 26	Paris FC	3–2	Lorient	Paris
14:00 CET	Cafaro 12' (yellow card) 31'; Kebbal (yellow card) 22'; Chergui (yellow card) 25'; Krasso 35' 38'; López (yellow card) 75'	Report	Soumano 25' (pen.); Igor Silva (yellow card) 61'; Kroupi 71' (pen.); Pagis (yellow card) 90+3'	Stadium: Stade Sébastien Charléty; Attendance: 17,635; Referee: (France) Olivier Thual

15 March 2025 27	Lorient	4–0	Bastia	Lorient
20:00 CET	Arthur Avom 8'; Katseris (yellow card) 38' (goal) 70'; Abergel (yellow card) 39'; Kroupi 42' (pen.); Talbi (yellow card) 50'; Yongwa 88'	Report	Sebas (yellow card) 77'	Stadium: Stade du Moustoir - Yves Allainmat; Attendance: 12,417; Referee: (France) Hakim Ben El Hadj

29 March 2025 28	Grenoble Foot 38	1–2	Lorient	Grenoble
14:00 CET	Jabbari 36'	Report	Kroupi 8' (pen.) 17'	Stadium: Stade des Alpes; Attendance: 5,098; Referee: (France) Geoffrey Kubler

5 April 2025 29	Lorient	–	Pau	Lorient
20:00 CET				Stadium: Stade du Moustoir - Yves Allainmat

=== Coupe de France ===
16 November 2024 Round 7	Ruffiac Malestroit	0-2	Lorient	Ploërmel
15:30 CET		Report	Laporte 16' 63'; Isaac James (yellow card) 74'	Stadium: Stade Municipal de Ploërmel; Attendance: 2,500; Referee: (France) Brendan Roffet

30 November 2024 Round 8	Monnaie	0-5	Lorient	Amboise
13:30 CET	Mohamed Tangara (yellow card) 54'	Report	Tosin 5'; Benoit Ricottier 28' (o.g.); Pagis 38'; Sohan Baldoni 68'; Diarra (yellow card) 90+2'; Kroupi 90+4'	Stadium: Stade Georges Boulogne; Attendance: 3,071; Referee: (France) Gabriel Henry

21 December 2024 Round of 64	Tours	0-3	Lorient	Tours
18:00 CET		Report		Stadium: Stade de la Vallée du Cher

15 January 2025 Round of 32	Cannes	2-1	Lorient	Cannes
18:30 CET	Chafik Abbas 13' 21'	Report	Le Bris 36'; Isaac James (yellow card) 55'; Enzo Genton (yellow card) 81'; Talbi (yellow card) 90+6'	Stadium: Stade Pierre de Coubertin; Attendance: 4,521; Referee: (France) Olivier Thual
