= 2024–25 FC Annecy season =

FC Annecy
2024–25 season
- Manager: Laurent Guyot
- Stadium: Parc des Sports
- Ligue 2: Pre-season
- Coupe de France: Pre-season

The 2024–25 season is the 98th season in the history of the FC Annecy, and the club's third consecutive season in Ligue 2. In addition to the domestic league, the team will participate in the Coupe de France.

== Transfers ==
=== In ===
Pos.	Player	Transferred from	Fee	Date	Source
FW	(Martinique) Kévin Farade	(France) Nancy	Loan return	30 June 2024	
DF	(France) Axel Drouhin	(France) Dijon	Free	1 July 2024	
DF	(France) Julien Kouadio	(France) Villefranche Beaujolais	Free	1 July 2024	
FW	(Gabon) Noha Lemina	(France) Paris Saint-Germain		30 July 2024	

=== Out ===
Pos.	Player	Transferred to	Fee	Date	Source
FW	(Martinique) Kévin Farade	(France) FC Fleury 91	Undisclosed	11 July 2024	
MF	(France) Yacouba Barry	(Belgium) RWD Molenbeek	€450,000	15 July 2024	
FW	(France) Brian Beyer	(Germany) VfL Osnabrück	Undisclosed	22 July 2024	

== Friendlies ==
=== Pre-season ===
Annecy announced the team's preparatory program on 28 June, with the players returning to the field on 1 July.

13 July 2024 Friendly	Annecy (France)	4–1	(France) FC Villefranche	Annecy
18:00	Tiendrebeogo 2'; Djoco 27' (pen.); Ntamack 60'; Beyer 83'		79'	Attendance: 0

20 July 2024 Friendly	Caen (France)	1–3	(France) Annecy	Port Valais, Switzerland
16:00	Niakaté 78'		Djoco 6'; Casadei 81'; Billemaz 85'

27 July 2024 Friendly	Annecy (France)	1–1	(France) Clermont
18:00	Djoco 5'		Maurer 12'

31 July 2024 Friendly	Bastia (France)	3–1	(France) Annecy	Aix-les-Bains

3 August 2024 Friendly	Annecy (France)	1–1	(France) Dijon	Hauteville
18:00	Ntamack 32'		Diallo 16'

10 August 2024 Friendly	Sochaux (France)	v	(France) Annecy	Montbéliard
				Stadium: Stade Auguste-Bonal

== Competitions ==
=== Overall record ===
Competition	First match	Last match	Starting round	Record							
Competition	First match	Last match	Starting round	Pld	W	D	L	GF	GA	GD	Win %
Ligue 2	16–18 August 2024	10 May 2025	Matchday 1	0	0	0	0	0	0	+0	—
Coupe de France				0	0	0	0	0	0	+0	—
Total				0	0	0	0	0	0	+0	—

Source: Soccerway

=== Ligue 2 ===
==== League table ====
Pos	Team	Pld	W	D	L	GF	GA	GD	Pts	Promotion or Relegation
4	Dunkerque	34	17	5	12	47	40	+7	56	Qualification for promotion play-offs semi-final
5	Guingamp	34	17	4	13	57	45	+12	55	Qualification for promotion play-offs semi-final
6	Annecy	34	14	9	11	42	42	0	51	
7	Laval	34	14	8	12	44	38	+6	50	
8	Bastia	34	11	15	8	43	37	+6	48	

Source: Ligue 2
Rules for classification: 1) Points; 2) Goal difference; 3) Number of goals scored; 4) Head-to-head goal difference; 5) Fair play points

==== Matches ====
The match schedule was released on 21 June 2024.

16 August 2024 1	Dunkerque	0–2	Annecy	Dunkirk
20:00 CEST	Courtet (yellow card) 80'	Report	Kashi 52'; Lajugie (yellow card) 71' (goal) 84'; Demoncy (yellow card) 80'	Stadium: Stade Marcel-Tribut; Attendance: 3,333; Referee: (France) Geoffrey Kubler

23 August 2024 2	Annecy	2–4	Martigues	Annecy
20:00 CEST	Ntamack (yellow card) 22'; Antoine Larose 26'; Axel Drouhin 84'; Lajugie (yellow card) 86'; Dago (yellow card) 90+2'	Report	Abdoul Diawara 11'; Ipiélé (yellow card) 36'; Siby 45'; Milan Robin 77'; Solvet 87'	Stadium: Parc des Sports; Attendance: 7,640; Referee: (France) Benoît Bastien

30 August 2024 3	Caen	1–1	Annecy	Caen
20:00 CEST	Rajot (yellow card) 42' (goal) 62'	Report	Lajugie (yellow card) 35'; Tiendrébéogo (yellow card) 47' (goal) 52'	Stadium: Stade Michel d'Ornano; Attendance: 13,706; Referee: (France) Antoine Valnet

13 September 2024 4	Annecy	3–0	Amiens	Annecy
20:00 CEST	Antoine Larose 19'; Pajot 61' (yellow card) 82'; Hamjatou Soukouna (yellow card) 62'; Demoncy 79'; Lemina (yellow card) 90+7'	Report	Carroll (yellow card) 7'; Jaouab (yellow card) 90+1'	Stadium: Parc des Sports; Attendance: 5,478; Referee: (France) Gaël Angoula

20 September 2024 5	Guingamp	2–2	Annecy	Guingamp
20:00 CEST	Sidibé 22'; Sissoko (yellow card) 43'; Hemia 80'	Report	Demoncy 4'; Pajot (yellow card) 36'; Kashi (yellow card) 45'; Axel Drouhin 65'	Stadium: Stade de Roudourou; Attendance: 6,464; Referee: (France) Pierre Gaillouste

24 September 2024 6	Annecy	1–0	Troyes	Annecy
20:30 CEST	Billemaz 11' (yellow card) 23'; Thibault Delphis (yellow card) 90+1'; Djoco (yellow card) 90+7'	Report	Abdoulaye Kanté (yellow card) 45+1'	Stadium: Parc des Sports; Attendance: 4,005; Referee: (France) Faouzi Benchabane

27 September 2024 7	Bastia	2–2	Annecy	Furiani
20:00 CEST	Akueson (yellow card) 16'; Placide (yellow card) 16'; Cissé 39'; Boutrah 51' (pen.)	Report	Juan José Guevara 10' (o.g.); Lajugie (yellow card) 26'; Ritchy Valme (yellow card) 38'; Dago 82'; Axel Drouhin (yellow card) 84'; Demoncy (yellow card) 90+4'	Stadium: Stade Armand-Cesari; Attendance: 10,578; Referee: (France) Thierry Bouille

4 October 2024 8	Annecy	1–0	Red Star	Annecy
20:00 CEST	Hamjatou Soukouna 84'	Report	Durivaux (yellow card) 56'; Mendy (yellow card) 73'; Durand (yellow card) 90+5'	Stadium: Parc des Sports; Attendance: 5,181; Referee: (France) Olivier Thual

19 October 2024 9	Lorient	4–2	Annecy	Lorient
20:00 CEST	Kroupi 55' (yellow card) 72' (goal) 74'; Mvuka 70'; Soumano 88'	Report	Djoco 7'; Escales (yellow card) 36'; Pajot (yellow card) 40'; Dago 90+2'	Stadium: Stade du Moustoir; Attendance: 11,512; Referee: (France) Robin Chapapria

25 October 2024 10	Annecy	2–0	Laval	Annecy
20:00 CEST	Bermont 28'; Kashi (yellow card) 45+5'; Antoine Larose 70'; Djoco (yellow card) 71'; Tiendrébéogo (yellow card) 90+6'	Report	Kouassi (yellow card) 35'; Tavares (yellow card) 87'	Stadium: Parc des Sports; Attendance: 5,362; Referee: (France) Abdelatif Kherradji

29 October 2024 11	Grenoble	0–0	Annecy	Grenoble
20:30 CEST		Report	Djoco (yellow card) 68'; Lajugie (yellow card) 86'	Stadium: Stade des Alpes; Attendance: 7,920; Referee: (France) Karim Abed

1 November 2024 12	Annecy	2–0	Pau	Annecy
20:30 CET	Djoco 5'; Pajot (yellow card) 33' (yellow-red card) 52'; Nsakala (yellow card) 45+1'; Kashi (yellow card) 82'; Demoncy (yellow card) 86'; Mohamed 89' (o.g.)	Report	Beusnard (yellow card) 8'; Ruiz (yellow card) 16'; Mboup (yellow card) 33'; Kamara (yellow card) 36'; Mohamed (yellow card) 85'	Stadium: Parc des Sports; Attendance: 5,333; Referee: (France) Florent Batta

8 November 2024 13	Rodez	5–1	Annecy	Rodez
20:00 CET	Kashi 23' (o.g.); Nkada 35' 70'; Baldé 68'; Bouchouari 76'	Report	Dago 3' (yellow card) 25'	Stadium: Stade Paul-Lignon; Attendance: 4,385; Referee: (France) Karim Abed
