= 2023–24 Wolverhampton Wanderers F.C. season =

English football club season

Wolverhampton Wanderers F.C.
2023–24 season
- Owner: Fosun International
- Chairman: Jeff Shi
- Head coach: Gary O'Neil
- Stadium: Molineux
- Premier League: 14th
- FA Cup: Quarter-finals
- EFL Cup: Third round
- Top goalscorer: League: Matheus Cunha; Hwang Hee-chan (12 each); All: Matheus Cunha (14)
- Average home league attendance: 31,029
Home colours	Away colours	Third colours

The 2023–24 season was the 146th season in the history of Wolverhampton Wanderers Football Club and their sixth consecutive season in the Premier League. In addition to the domestic league, the club participated in the FA Cup and the EFL Cup.

== Managerial changes ==
On 8 August, the club parted company with Julen Lopetegui by mutual agreement after he expressed dissatisfaction with the club's limited transfer business. A day later, Gary O'Neil was appointed head coach on a three-year deal.

== Players ==
As of 14 February 2024

No.	Player	Position	Nationality	Place of birth	Date of birth (age)	Previous club	Date signed	Fee	Contract end
Goalkeepers
1	José Sá	GK	(Portugal)	Braga	17 January 1993 (age 33)	(Greece) Olympiacos	15 July 2021	£6,800,000	30 June 2027
25	Dan Bentley	GK	(England)	Basildon	13 July 1993 (age 33)	Bristol City	25 January 2023	£50,000	30 June 2025
40	Tom King	GK	(Wales)	(England) Plymouth	9 March 1995 (age 31)	Northampton Town	3 July 2023	Free	30 June 2027
Defenders
2	Matt Doherty	RB	(Republic of Ireland)	Swords	16 January 1992 (age 34)	(Spain) Atlético Madrid	20 July 2023	Free	30 June 2026
3	Rayan Aït-Nouri	LB	(Algeria)	(France) Montreuil	6 June 2001 (age 25)	(France) Angers	9 July 2021	£9,500,000	30 June 2026
4	Santiago Bueno	CB	(Uruguay)	Montevideo	9 November 1998 (age 28)	(Spain) Girona	31 August 2023	Undisclosed	30 June 2027
15	Craig Dawson	CB	(England)	Rochdale	6 May 1990 (age 36)	West Ham United	22 January 2023	£2,300,000	30 June 2025
17	Hugo Bueno	LB	(Spain)	Vigo	18 September 2002 (age 24)	(Spain) Areosa	1 July 2019	Undisclosed	30 June 2028
22	Nélson Semedo	RB	(Portugal)	Lisbon	16 November 1993 (age 32)	(Spain) Barcelona	23 September 2020	£29,000,000	30 June 2025
23	Max Kilman (captain)	CB	(England)	London	23 May 1997 (age 29)	Maidenhead United	9 August 2018	Free	30 June 2028
24	Toti	CB	(Portugal)	(Guinea-Bissau) Bissau	16 January 1999 (age 27)	(Portugal) Estoril Praia	2 September 2020	£700,000	30 June 2029
53	Aaron Keto-Diyawa	LB	(England)		11 September 2003 (age 23)	Fulham	1 July 2020	Undisclosed	30 June 2025
Midfielders
5	Mario Lemina	DM	(Gabon)	Libreville	1 September 1993 (age 33)	(France) Nice	13 January 2023	£9,750,000	30 June 2025
6	Boubacar Traoré	DM	(Mali)	Bamako	20 August 2001 (age 25)	(France) Metz	1 July 2023	£10,000,000	30 June 2027
8	João Gomes	CM	(Brazil)	Rio de Janeiro	12 February 2001 (age 25)	(Brazil) Flamengo	30 January 2023	£16,400,000	30 June 2028
14	Noha Lemina	AM	(France)	(Gabon) Libreville	17 June 2005 (age 21)	(France) Paris Saint-Germain	31 January 2024	Loan	31 May 2024
20	Tommy Doyle	CM	(England)	Manchester	17 October 2001 (age 25)	Manchester City	1 September 2023	Loan	31 May 2024
27	Jean-Ricner Bellegarde	CM	(France)	Colombes	27 June 1998 (age 28)	(France) Strasbourg	1 September 2023	Undisclosed	30 June 2028
42	Harvey Griffiths	DM	(England)	Oldham	22 September 2003 (age 23)	Manchester City	31 August 2021	£350,000	30 June 2026
62	Tawanda Chirewa	AM	(Zimbabwe)	Chelmsford	11 October 2003 (age 23)	Ipswich Town	18 September 2023	Free	30 June 2027
Forwards
7	Pedro Neto	RW	(Portugal)	Viana do Castelo	9 March 2000 (age 26)	(Italy) Lazio	2 August 2019	£16,300,000	30 June 2027
11	Hwang Hee-chan	CF	(South Korea)	Chuncheon	26 January 1996 (age 30)	(Germany) RB Leipzig	1 July 2022	£14,300,000	30 June 2028
12	Matheus Cunha	CF	(Brazil)	João Pessoa	27 June 1999 (age 27)	(Spain) Atlético Madrid	1 July 2023	£44,000,000	30 June 2027
21	Pablo Sarabia	RW	(Spain)	Madrid	11 May 1992 (age 34)	(France) Paris Saint-Germain	17 January 2023	£4,300,000	30 June 2025
30	Enso González	LW	(Paraguay)	Asunción	20 January 2005 (age 21)	(Paraguay) Libertad	31 August 2023	£5,150,000	30 June 2028
45	Ty Barnett	LW	(England)	Birmingham	19 July 2005 (age 21)	Birmingham City	1 July 2019	Undisclosed	30 June 2026
63	Nathan Fraser	CF	(Republic of Ireland)	(England) Wolverhampton	22 February 2005 (age 21)	Academy	28 February 2022	Trainee	30 June 2025
Out on Loan
9	Fábio Silva	CF	(Portugal)	Gondomar	19 July 2002 (age 24)	(Portugal) Porto	5 September 2020	£35,700,000	30 June 2026
10	Daniel Podence	LW	(Portugal)	Oeiras	21 October 1995 (age 31)	(Greece) Olympiacos	30 January 2020	£16,500,000	30 June 2024
13	Louie Moulden	GK	(England)	Bolton	6 January 2002 (age 24)	Manchester City	1 July 2021	Free	30 June 2024
14	Yerson Mosquera	CB	(Colombia)	Apartadó	2 May 2001 (age 25)	(Colombia) Atlético Nacional	1 July 2021	£4,500,000	30 June 2026
18	Saša Kalajdžić	CF	(Austria)	Vienna	7 July 1997 (age 29)	(Germany) VfB Stuttgart	31 August 2022	£15,400,000	30 June 2027
20	Chiquinho	LW	(Portugal)	Cascais	5 February 2000 (age 26)	(Portugal) Estoril Praia	17 January 2022	£2,900,000	30 June 2026
32	Joe Hodge	DM	(Republic of Ireland)	(England) Manchester	14 September 2002 (age 24)	Manchester City	27 August 2021	Undisclosed	30 June 2027
39	Luke Cundle	CM	(England)	Warrington	26 April 2002 (age 24)	Academy	1 July 2021	Trainee	30 June 2026
—	Ki-Jana Hoever	RB	(Netherlands)	Amsterdam	18 January 2002 (age 24)	Liverpool	19 September 2020	£9,000,000	30 June 2025
—	Gonçalo Guedes	SS	(Portugal)	Benavente	29 November 1996 (age 29)	(Spain) Valencia	8 August 2022	£27,500,000	30 June 2027

== Transfers ==
=== In ===
Date	Pos.	Player	Transferred from	Fee	Ref.
1 July 2023	CF	(England) Emilio Ballard-Matthews	(England) Watford	Free transfer	
1 July 2023	CF	(Brazil) Matheus Cunha	(Spain) Atlético Madrid	£44,000,000	
1 July 2023	GK	(Northern Ireland) Josh Gracey	(Northern Ireland) Glenavon	Free transfer	
1 July 2023	CF	(England) Jashayde Greenwood	(Wales) Cardiff City	Free transfer	
1 July 2023	DM	(Mali) Boubacar Traoré	(France) Metz	£9,500,000	
3 July 2023	GK	(Wales) Tom King	(England) Northampton Town	Free transfer	
20 July 2023	RB	(Republic of Ireland) Matt Doherty	(Spain) Atlético Madrid	Free Transfer	
30 July 2023	LW	(Portugal) Leo Lopes	(Switzerland) Grasshopper	Undisclosed	
14 August 2023	RW	(England) Reiss Bowen	(England) Fleetwood Town	Free transfer	
31 August 2023	CB	(Uruguay) Santiago Bueno	(Spain) Girona	Undisclosed	
31 August 2023	LW	(Paraguay) Enso González	(Paraguay) Libertad	Undisclosed	
1 September 2023	CM	(France) Jean-Ricner Bellegarde	(France) Strasbourg	Undisclosed	
2 September 2023	CM	(England) Matthew Whittingham	(England) Manchester City	Undisclosed	
18 September 2023	CM	(Zimbabwe) Tawanda Chirewa	(England) Ipswich Town	Undisclosed	
12 October 2023	CF	(Spain) Dani Ángel	(England) Clapton	Undisclosed	
8 January 2024	CF	(England) Fletcher Holman	(England) Eastbourne Borough	Undisclosed	

=== Out ===
Date	Pos.	Player	Transferred to	Fee	Ref.
23 June 2023	DM	(Portugal) Rúben Neves	(Saudi Arabia) Al-Hilal	£47,000,000	
30 June 2023	CB	(England) Michael Agboola	(England) Hullbridge Sports	End of contract	
30 June 2023	CF	(Spain) Diego Costa	(Brazil) Botafogo	End of contract	
30 June 2023	RW	(Northern Ireland) Lee Harkin	(Northern Ireland) Coleraine	End of contract	
30 June 2023	CM	(England) Jack Hodnett	(England) Shifnal Town	End of contract	
30 June 2023	RB	(England) Luke Matheson	(England) Bolton Wanderers	End of contract	
30 June 2023	CM	(Portugal) João Moutinho	(Portugal) Braga	End of contract	
30 June 2023	CM	(England) Taylor Perry	(England) Shrewsbury Town	End of contract	
30 June 2023	RB	(Northern Ireland) Jack Scott	(Northern Ireland) Linfield	End of contract	
30 June 2023	RW	(Spain) Adama Traoré	(England) Fulham	End of contract	
1 July 2023	CB	(England) Conor Coady	(England) Leicester City	£7,500,000	
4 July 2023	CB	(Republic of Ireland) Nathan Collins	(England) Brentford	£23,000,000	
7 July 2023	MF	(Japan) Hayao Kawabe	(Belgium) Standard Liège	Undisclosed	
15 July 2023	CB	(England) Dion Sanderson	(England) Birmingham City	Undisclosed	
21 July 2023	GK	(England) Jackson Smith	(England) Walsall	Undisclosed	
25 July 2023	CF	(Mexico) Raúl Jiménez	(England) Fulham	£5,500,000	
28 July 2023	LB	(England) Ryan Giles	(England) Luton Town	Undisclosed	
31 July 2023	CM	(England) Ackeme Francis-Burrell	(England) Stockport County	Free transfer	
3 August 2023	GK	(Montenegro) Matija Sarkic	(England) Millwall	Undisclosed	
18 August 2023	CB	(Republic of Ireland) Lewis Richards	(England) Bradford City	Undisclosed	
1 September 2023	CM	(Portugal) Matheus Nunes	(England) Manchester City	£53,000,000	
3 September 2023	CM	(Malta) Dylan Scicluna	(Australia) Western Sydney Wanderers	Free transfer	
8 September 2023	RB	(England) Leo Shahar	(England) Newcastle United	Undisclosed	
11 September 2023	CB	(Portugal) Christian Marques	(Switzerland) Yverdon-Sport	Undisclosed	
1 January 2024	GK	(Iceland) Palmi Arinbjornsson	(Iceland) Vikingur	Free transfer	
8 February 2024	DM	(Malta) Lucas Scicluna	(Australia) Central Coast Mariners	Free transfer	
26 January 2024	LB	(Spain) Jonny	(Greece) PAOK	Contract terminated	
1 February 2024	RW	(Canada) Theo Corbeanu	(Spain) Granada	Undisclosed	
6 February 2024	CM	(Portugal) Bruno Jordão	(Poland) Radomiak Radom	Contract terminated	
16 March 2024	CB	(Wales) Brayden Clarke	(England) Arsenal	Undisclosed	

=== Loaned in ===
Date	Pos.	Player	Loaned from	Until	Ref.
1 September 2023	CM	(England) Tommy Doyle	(England) Manchester City	End of Season	
31 January 2024	AM	(France) Noha Lemina	(France) Paris Saint-Germain	End of Season	

=== Loaned out ===
Date	Pos.	Player	Loaned to	On loan until	Ref.
29 June 2023	CB	(Colombia) Yerson Mosquera	(United States) FC Cincinnati	1 January 2024	
1 July 2023	RW	(Jamaica) Tyler Roberts	(England) Doncaster Rovers	2 January 2024 (Note: On 2 January, Roberts was recalled from his season-long loan at Doncaster.)	
4 July 2023	RW	(Canada) Theo Corbeanu	(Switzerland) Grasshopper	19 January 2024 (Note: On 19 January, Corbeanu was recalled from his season-long loan at Grasshoppers and sold to Granada.)	
4 July 2023	CB	(Netherlands) Nigel Lonwijk	(Switzerland) Grasshopper	16 November 2023 (Note: On 16 November, Lonwijk was recalled from his season-long loan at Grasshoppers and subsequently joined Wycombe on loan.)	
13 July 2023	GK	(England) Louie Moulden	(England) Rochdale	16 January 2024 (Note: On 16 January, Moulden was recalled from his season-long loan at Rochdale and subsequently joined Northampton on loan.)	
21 July 2023	RB	(Netherlands) Ki-Jana Hoever	(England) Stoke City	End of Season	
22 July 2023	LW	(Portugal) Chiquinho	(England) Stoke City	31 August 2023 (Note: On 31 August, Chiquinho was recalled from his season-long loan at Stoke and joined Famalicão on loan the following day.)	
27 July 2023	LB	(Jamaica) Dexter Lembikisa	(England) Rotherham United	10 January 2024 (Note: On 10 January, Lembikisa was recalled from his season-long loan at Rotherham and subsequently joined Hearts on loan.)	
28 July 2023	CB	(England) Oliver Tipton	(England) Notts County	2 January 2024 (Note: On 2 January, Tipton was recalled from his season-long loan at Notts County.)	
7 August 2023	CM	(England) Luke Cundle	(England) Plymouth Argyle	7 January 2024 (Note: On 7 January, Cundle was recalled from his season-long loan at Plymouth and subsequently joined Stoke on loan.)	
23 August 2023	AM	(Wales) Chem Campbell	(England) Charlton Athletic	15 January 2024 (Note: On 15 January, Campbell was recalled from his season-long loan at Charlton and subsequently joined Wycombe on loan.)	
29 August 2023	RB	(Hungary) Bendegúz Bolla	(Switzerland) Servette	End of Season	
29 August 2023	LW	(Portugal) Gonçalo Guedes	(Portugal) Benfica	19 January 2024 (Note: On 19 January, Guedes was recalled from his season-long loan at Benfica and subsequently joined Villarreal on loan.)	
31 August 2023	CB	(England) Alfie Pond	(England) Stockport County	2 January 2024 (Note: On 2 January, Pond was recalled from his season-long loan at Stockport.)	
1 September 2023	DM	(England) Harvey Griffiths	(England) Walsall	2 January 2024 (Note: On 2 January, Griffiths was recalled from his season-long loan at Walsall.)	
1 September 2023	LW	(Portugal) Chiquinho	(Portugal) Famalicão	End of Season	
4 September 2023	LW	(Portugal) Daniel Podence	(Greece) Olympiacos	End of Season	
1 January 2024	CF	(Portugal) Fábio Silva	(Scotland) Rangers	End of Season	
4 January 2024	AM	(Wales) Owen Hesketh	(England) Kidderminster Harriers	End of Season	
7 January 2024	CF	(Austria) Saša Kalajdžić	(Germany) Eintracht Frankfurt	End of Season	
9 January 2024	CM	(England) Luke Cundle	(England) Stoke City	End of Season	
12 January 2024	RB	(Jamaica) Dexter Lembikisa	(Scotland) Heart of Midlothian	End of Season	
16 January 2024	GK	(England) Louie Moulden	(England) Northampton Town	End of Season	
16 January 2024	AM	(Wales) Chem Campbell	(England) Wycombe Wanderers	End of Season	
16 January 2024	GK	(England) Joe Young	(England) Buxton	End of Season	
19 January 2024	LW	(Portugal) Gonçalo Guedes	(Spain) Villarreal	End of Season	
23 January 2024	CB	(Colombia) Yerson Mosquera	(Spain) Villarreal	End of Season	
1 February 2024	DM	(Republic of Ireland) Joe Hodge	(England) Queens Park Rangers	End of season	
1 February 2024	CB	(Netherlands) Nigel Lonwijk	(England) Wycombe Wanderers	End of Season	
3 February 2024	RB	(Singapore) Harry Birtwistle	(England) Oxford City	End of Season	
3 February 2024	CF	(England) Owen Farmer	(England) Rushall Olympic	End of Season	
12 March 2024	CB	(Indonesia) Justin Hubner	(Japan) Cerezo Osaka	31 October 2024	

== Pre-season and friendlies ==
On 11 May, Wolves announced a pre-season tour to South Korea, the club's first-ever visit, with friendly matches against Celtic and Roma confirmed. Just over two weeks later, the club confirmed a third pre-season friendly with Rennes visiting Molineux. A second home friendly against Luton Town was also added. Following the cancellation of the tour to South Korea, the pre-season fixture with Celtic was later rescheduled to be played in Dublin. A return trip to Portugal was later confirmed, with a friendly against Porto.

Win Draw Loss Fixtures

9 July 2023 Friendly	Vitória de Guimarães	1–2	Wolverhampton Wanderers	Portugal
13:00 WEST; 13:00 BST		Report	Cunha; Farmer

12 July 2023 Friendly	Farense	0–1	Wolverhampton Wanderers	Portugal
20:00 WEST; 20:00 BST		Report	Fraser

25 July 2023 Friendly	Porto	0–1	Wolverhampton Wanderers	Parchal, Portugal
19:00 WEST; 19:00 BST		Report	Neto 19'	Stadium: Estadio da Bela Vista

26 July 2023 Friendly	Celtic	Cancelled	Wolverhampton Wanderers	Suwon, South Korea
20:00 KST; 12:00 BST				Stadium: Suwon World Cup Stadium
Note: South Korea tour was cancelled due to financial and logistical obligations were not met.

29 July 2023 Friendly	Roma	Cancelled	Wolverhampton Wanderers	Incheon, South Korea
20:00 KST; 12:00 BST				Stadium: Incheon Asiad Main Stadium
Note: South Korea tour was cancelled due to financial and logistical obligations were not met.

29 July 2023 Friendly	Celtic	1–1	Wolverhampton Wanderers	Dublin, Ireland
14:00 BST	Furuhashi 6'	Report	Cunha 86' (pen.)	Stadium: Aviva Stadium

2 August 2023 Friendly	Wolverhampton Wanderers	0–0	Luton Town	Wolverhampton
19:30 BST		Report		Stadium: Molineux Stadium; Referee: Darren Bond

5 August 2023 Friendly	Wolverhampton Wanderers	3–1	Rennes	Wolverhampton
13:00 BST	Aït-Nouri 11'; João Gomes 49'; Hwang 67'	Report	Bourigeaud 14' (pen.)	Stadium: Molineux Stadium

== Competitions ==
=== Overall record ===
Competition	First match	Last match	Starting round	Final position	Record							
Competition	First match	Last match	Starting round	Final position	Pld	W	D	L	GF	GA	GD	Win %
Premier League	14 August 2023	19 May 2024	Matchday 1	14th	38	13	7	18	50	65	−15	34.21
FA Cup	5 January 2024	16 March 2024	Third round	Quarter-finals	5	3	1	1	9	6	+3	60.00
EFL Cup	29 August 2023	26 September 2023	Second round	Third round	2	1	0	1	7	3	+4	50.00
Total					45	17	8	20	66	74	−8	37.78

Source: Soccerway

=== Premier League ===
==== League table ====
Pos	Team	Pld	W	D	L	GF	GA	GD	Pts
12	Bournemouth	38	13	9	16	54	67	−13	48
13	Fulham	38	13	8	17	55	61	−6	47
14	Wolverhampton Wanderers	38	13	7	18	50	65	−15	46
15	Everton	38	13	9	16	40	51	−11	40 (Note: Everton were deducted eight points for breaching profitability and sustainability rules. They were originally deducted ten points but this was reduced to six after an appeal. The club were then deducted an additional two points for further PSR breaches.)
16	Brentford	38	10	9	19	56	65	−9	39

Source: Premier League
Rules for classification: 1) Points; 2) Goal difference; 3) Goals scored; 4) If the champions, relegated teams or qualified teams for UEFA competitions cannot be determined by rules 1 to 3, rules 4.1 to 4.3 are applied – 4.1) Points gained in head-to-head record between such teams; 4.2) Away goals scored in head-to-head record between such teams; 4.3) Play-offs

==== Results summary ====
Overall								Home						Away					
Pld	W	D	L	GF	GA	GD	Pts	W	D	L	GF	GA	GD	W	D	L	GF	GA	GD
38	13	7	18	50	65	−15	46	8	3	8	26	30	−4	5	4	10	24	35	−11

Source: Soccerway

==== Results by round ====
Round	1	2	3	4	5	6	7	8	9	10	11	12	13	14	15	16	17	18	19	20	21	22	23	24	25	26	27	28	30	31	32	33	34	29^{1}	35	36	37	38
Ground	A	H	A	A	H	A	H	H	A	H	A	H	A	A	H	H	A	H	A	H	A	H	A	H	A	H	A	H	A	A	H	A	H	H	H	A	H	A
Result	L	L	W	L	L	D	W	D	W	D	L	W	L	L	W	D	L	W	W	W	D	L	W	L	W	W	L	W	L	D	L	D	L	L	W	L	L	L
Position	17	19	15	15	16	16	15	14	12	12	14	12	12	13	13	13	13	11	11	11	11	11	10	11	11	9	10	9	10	11	11	11	11	12	11	12	13	14
Points	0	0	3	3	3	4	7	8	11	12	12	15	15	15	18	19	19	22	25	28	29	29	32	32	35	38	38	41	41	42	42	43	43	43	46	46	46	46

Source: Soccerway
A = Away; H = Home; W = Win; D = Draw; L = Loss

==== Matches ====
On 15 June, the Premier League fixtures were released.

Win Draw Loss Fixtures

14 August 2023 1	Manchester United	1–0	Wolverhampton Wanderers	Trafford
20:00 BST	Martínez (yellow card) 17'; Shaw (yellow card) 44'; Varane 76'	Report	Lemina (yellow card) 27'; Aït-Nouri (yellow card) 35'	Stadium: Old Trafford; Attendance: 73,358 (3,097 away fans); Referee: Simon Hooper
Note: Live on Sky Sports

19 August 2023 2	Wolverhampton Wanderers	1–4	Brighton & Hove Albion	Wolverhampton
15:00 BST	Dawson (yellow card) 17'; Hwang Hee-chan 61', (yellow card) 63'; Nunes (yellow card) 76' (yellow-red card) 90+5'; Kilman (yellow card) 88'	Report	Groß (yellow card) 8'; Mitoma 15'; Milner (yellow card) 18'; Enciso (yellow card) 19'; Estupiñán 46', (yellow card) 60'; March 51', 55'; João Pedro (yellow card) 64'	Stadium: Molineux Stadium; Attendance: 31,317 (2,965 away fans); Referee: Andrew Madley

26 August 2023 3	Everton	0–1	Wolverhampton Wanderers	Liverpool
15:00 BST	Branthwaite (yellow card) 53'; Garner (yellow card) 63'; Chermiti (yellow card) 90'	Report	João Gomes (yellow card) 29'; Semedo (yellow card) 40'; Lemina (yellow card) 51'; Dawson (yellow card) 68'; Kalajdžić 87'	Stadium: Goodison Park; Attendance: 38,851 (2,972 away fans); Referee: Craig Pawson

3 September 2023 4	Crystal Palace	3–2	Wolverhampton Wanderers	Selhurst
14:00 BST	Ward (yellow card) 52'; Édouard 56', 84'; Eze 78'	Report	Semedo (yellow card) 24'; Aït-Nouri (yellow card) 27'; João Gomes (yellow card) 55'; Hwang Hee-chan 65'; Cunha 90+6'	Stadium: Selhurst Park; Attendance: 24,741 (2,687 away fans); Referee: Robert Jones
Note: Live on Sky Sports

16 September 2023 5	Wolverhampton Wanderers	1–3	Liverpool	Wolverhampton
12:30 BST	Hwang Hee-chan 7'; Semedo (yellow card) 71'	Report	Mac Allister (yellow card) 4'; Gakpo 55'; Robertson 85'; H. Bueno 90+1' (o.g.); Elliott (yellow card) 90+2'; Jones (yellow card) 90+2'	Stadium: Molineux Stadium; Attendance: 31,543 (2,968 away fans); Referee: Michael Oliver

23 September 2023 6	Luton Town	1–1	Wolverhampton Wanderers	Luton
15:00 BST	Morris 65' (pen.)	Report	Bellegarde (red card) 39'; João Gomes (yellow card) 45+1'; Neto 50'; Lemina (yellow card) 90+6'	Stadium: Kenilworth Road; Attendance: 10,893 (1,091 away fans); Referee: Josh Smith

30 September 2023 7	Wolverhampton Wanderers	2–1	Manchester City	Wolverhampton
15:00 BST	Dias 13' (o.g.); Hwang Hee-chan (yellow card) 24', (goal) 66'; Lemina (yellow card) 39'; Neto (yellow card) 57'; Sá (yellow card) 83'; Silva (yellow card) 90+3'; Semedo (yellow card) 90+8'	Report	Walker (yellow card) 17'; Álvarez 58', (yellow card) 63'; Kovačić (yellow card) 59'; Doku (yellow card) 82'	Stadium: Molineux Stadium; Attendance: 31,415 (2,965 away fans); Referee: Craig Pawson

8 October 2023 8	Wolverhampton Wanderers	1–1	Aston Villa	Wolverhampton
14:00 BST	Dawson (yellow card) 28'; Hwang Hee-chan 53'; Lemina (yellow card) 62' (yellow-red card) 90+4'; Semedo (yellow card) 67'	Report	Kamara (yellow card) 6'; McGinn (yellow card) 29'; Torres 55'	Stadium: Molineux Stadium; Attendance: 31,578 (2,951 away fans); Referee: Robert Jones

21 October 2023 9	Bournemouth	1–2	Wolverhampton Wanderers	Bournemouth
15:00 BST	Solanke 17'; Zabarnyi (yellow card) 34'; Scott (yellow card) 45+2'; Cook (red card) 54'	Report	Cunha (yellow card) 42', (goal) 47'; Kilman (yellow card) 45+3'; Hwang Hee-chan (yellow card) 54'; Traoré (yellow card) 83'; Kalajdžić 88'; Neto (yellow card) 89'; Sarabia (yellow card) 90+1'	Stadium: Dean Court; Attendance: 11,175 (1,253 away fans); Referee: Paul Tierney

28 October 2023 10	Wolverhampton Wanderers	2–2	Newcastle United	Wolverhampton
17:30 BST	Lemina 36'; Hwang Hee-chan 71'; Aït-Nouri (yellow card) 83'	Report	Wilson 22', 45+4' (pen.); Burn (yellow card) 66'; Lascelles (yellow card) 69'; Trippier (yellow card) 82'; Longstaff (yellow card) 90+6'	Stadium: Molineux Stadium; Attendance: 31,584 (2,955 away fans); Referee: Anthony Taylor

4 November 2023 11	Sheffield United	2–1	Wolverhampton Wanderers	Sheffield
15:00 GMT	Baldock (yellow card) 22'; Archer 72'; Hamer (yellow card) 89'; Norwood 90+10' (pen.)	Report	Dawson (yellow card) 49'; Doyle (yellow card) 58'; Silva (yellow card) 82'; Bellegarde 89'	Stadium: Bramall Lane; Attendance: 29,454 (2,801 away fans); Referee: Robert Jones

11 November 2023 12	Wolverhampton Wanderers	2–1	Tottenham Hotspur	Wolverhampton
12:30 GMT	Sarabia 90+1'; Dawson (yellow card) 90+5'; Doherty (yellow card) 90+6'; Lemina 90+7'; Aït-Nouri (yellow card) 90+9'; João Gomes (yellow card) 90+9'	Report	Johnson 3'; Emerson (yellow card) 45'; Bissouma (yellow card) 45+4'; Bentancur (yellow card) 89'	Stadium: Molineux Stadium; Attendance: 31,642 (2,970 away fans); Referee: Tim Robinson

27 November 2023 13	Fulham	3–2	Wolverhampton Wanderers	Fulham
20:00 GMT	Iwobi 7'; Ream (yellow card) 19'; Willian 59' (pen.), 90+4' (pen.); Carlos Vinícius (yellow card) 88'	Report	Cunha 22'; João Gomes (yellow card) 33'; Hwang Hee-chan 75' (pen.); Lemina (yellow card) 84'	Stadium: Craven Cottage; Attendance: 24,366 (2,641 away fans); Referee: Michael Salisbury

2 December 2023 14	Arsenal	2–1	Wolverhampton Wanderers	Holloway
15:00 GMT	Saka 6'; Ødegaard 13'; Saliba (yellow card) 68'	Report	Cunha 86', (yellow card) 90+9'; Hwang Hee-chan (yellow card) 88'	Stadium: Emirates Stadium; Attendance: 60,262 (2,943 away fans); Referee: Peter Bankes

5 December 2023 15	Wolverhampton Wanderers	1–0	Burnley	Wolverhampton
19:30 GMT	Hwang Hee-chan 42'; Lemina (yellow card) 57'; Kilman (yellow card) 80'	Report	Brownhill (yellow card) 2'; Berge (yellow card) 53'; Taylor (yellow card) 63'; Ekdal (yellow card) 74'	Stadium: Molineux Stadium; Attendance: 30,439 (1,284 away fans); Referee: Jarred Gillett

9 December 2023 16	Wolverhampton Wanderers	1–1	Nottingham Forest	Wolverhampton
15:00 GMT	Cunha 32'	Report	Toffolo 14'; Kouyaté (yellow card) 33'	Stadium: Molineux Stadium; Attendance: 31,543 (2,969 away fans); Referee: Sam Barrott

17 December 2023 17	West Ham United	3–0	Wolverhampton Wanderers	Stratford
14:00 GMT	Kudus 22', 32'; Zouma (yellow card) 45+4'; Bowen 74'; Coufal (yellow card) 87'; Kehrer (yellow card) 90+3'	Report	Toti (yellow card) 45+2'	Stadium: London Stadium; Attendance: 62,455 (2,941 away fans); Referee: Chris Kavanagh

24 December 2023 18	Wolverhampton Wanderers	2–1	Chelsea	Wolverhampton
13:00 GMT	Lemina (yellow card) 27', (goal) 51'; Cunha (yellow card) 64'; Doherty 90+3'; H. Bueno (yellow card) 90+10'	Report	Gallagher (yellow card) 30'; Palmer (yellow card) 56'; Gusto (yellow card) 60'; Jackson (yellow card) 62'; Nkunku 90+6'; Sterling (yellow card) 90+9'; Bettinelli (yellow card) 90+11'	Stadium: Molineux Stadium; Attendance: 31,641 (2,964 away fans); Referee: David Coote

27 December 2023 19	Brentford	1–4	Wolverhampton Wanderers	Brentford
19:30 GMT	Wissa 16'; Nørgaard (yellow card) 43'	Report	Lemina 13'; Hwang Hee-chan 14', 28'; Kilman (yellow card) 54'; Bellegarde 79'	Stadium: Brentford Community Stadium; Attendance: 17,109 (1,665 away fans); Referee: Andrew Madley

30 December 2023 20	Wolverhampton Wanderers	3–0	Everton	Wolverhampton
15:00 GMT	Kilman 25'; Aït-Nouri (yellow card) 43'; Doyle (yellow card) 45+5'; Cunha 53'; Dawson 61'	Report	Patterson (yellow card) 23'; McNeil (yellow card) 45+5'; Tarkowski (yellow card) 67'	Stadium: Molineux Stadium; Attendance: 31,639 (2,970 away fans); Referee: Thomas Bramall

22 January 2024 21	Brighton & Hove Albion	0–0	Wolverhampton Wanderers	Brighton
19:45 GMT	Webster (yellow card) 82'	Report	Cunha (yellow card) 45+2'; Dawson (yellow card) 54'; Kilman (yellow card) 73'; Toti (yellow card) 90+2'	Stadium: Falmer Stadium; Attendance: 31,505 (2,238 away fans); Referee: Craig Pawson

1 February 2024 22	Wolverhampton Wanderers	3–4	Manchester United	Wolverhampton
20:15 GMT	Dawson (yellow card) 45+2'; Sarabia 71' (pen.); Kilman 85'; Cunha (yellow card) 89'; Neto 90+5'	Report	Casemiro (yellow card) 3'; Rashford 5'; Højlund 22'; Martínez (yellow card) 48'; McTominay 75'; Onana (yellow card) 78'; Mainoo 90+7'; Garnacho (yellow card) 90+8'; Shaw (yellow card) 90+10'	Stadium: Molineux Stadium; Attendance: 31,641 (2,943 away fans); Referee: Jarred Gillett
Note: The match was originally scheduled for 30 January, but was moved for TV coverage.

4 February 2024 23	Chelsea	2–4	Wolverhampton Wanderers	Fulham
14:00 GMT	Palmer 19'; Gusto (yellow card) 31'; Caicedo (yellow card) 56'; Chilwell (yellow card) 78'; Thiago Silva 86'	Report	Cunha 22', 63', 82' (pen.); Semedo (yellow card) 39'; Neto (yellow card) 41'; Disasi 43' (o.g.)	Stadium: Stamford Bridge; Attendance: 39,628 (3,005 away fans); Referee: Tim Robinson

10 February 2024 24	Wolverhampton Wanderers	0–2	Brentford	Wolverhampton
15:00 GMT	Fraser (yellow card) 70'; Lemina (yellow card) 88'	Report	Nørgaard 35'; Flekken (yellow card) 60'; Jensen (yellow card) 68'; Toney 77'; Janelt (yellow card) 81'	Stadium: Molineux Stadium; Attendance: 30,731 (1,399 away fans); Referee: Simon Hooper

17 February 2024 25	Tottenham Hotspur	1–2	Wolverhampton Wanderers	Tottenham
15:00 GMT	Kulusevski 46'	Report	João Gomes 42', 63', (yellow card) 66'	Stadium: Tottenham Hotspur Stadium; Attendance: 61,532 (2,978 away fans); Referee: Anthony Taylor

25 February 2024 26	Wolverhampton Wanderers	1–0	Sheffield United	Wolverhampton
13:30 GMT	Sarabia 30'; Semedo (yellow card) 72'; Toti (yellow card) 90+6'	Report	Ahmedhodžić (yellow card) 72'	Stadium: Molineux Stadium; Attendance: 30,789 (2,345 away fans); Referee: Darren Bond

2 March 2024 27	Newcastle United	3–0	Wolverhampton Wanderers	Newcastle upon Tyne
15:00 GMT	Isak 14'; Gordon 33'; Livramento 90+2'	Report	Aït-Nouri (yellow card) 85'	Stadium: St James’ Park; Attendance: 52,206 (3,144 away fans); Referee: Tim Robinson

9 March 2024 28	Wolverhampton Wanderers	2–1	Fulham	Wolverhampton
15:00 GMT	Semedo (yellow card) 45'; Aït-Nouri 52'; S. Bueno (yellow card) 57'; Cairney 67' (o.g.)	Report	Reed (yellow card) 51'; Palhinha (yellow card) 72'; Iwobi 90+8'	Stadium: Molineux Stadium; Attendance: 30,860 (1,723 away fans); Referee: Tony Harrington

30 March 2024 30	Aston Villa	2–0	Wolverhampton Wanderers	Birmingham
17:30 GMT	Tielemans (yellow card) 30'; Diaby 36'; Konsa 65'; Durán (yellow card) 84'; Digne (yellow card) 90+6'	Report	Sarabia (yellow card) 19'; Chirewa (yellow card) 81'; Kilman (yellow card) 84'; Toti (yellow card) 90+1'	Stadium: Villa Park; Attendance: 42,640 (2,946 away fans); Referee: Paul Tierney
Note: Fixture was originally scheduled for a 15:00 kick-off, but was pushed back for live Sky Sports coverage.

2 April 2024 31	Burnley	1–1	Wolverhampton Wanderers	Burnley
19:45 BST	Bruun Larsen 37'	Report	Aït-Nouri 45+3'; Semedo (yellow card) 54'; João Gomes (yellow card) 90+3'	Stadium: Turf Moor; Attendance: 21,528 (2,223 away fans); Referee: Thomas Bramall

6 April 2024 32	Wolverhampton Wanderers	1–2	West Ham United	Wolverhampton
15:00 BST	Sarabia 33' (pen.), (yellow card) 90+12'; João Gomes (yellow card) 43'; Toti (yellow card) 78'; Traoré (yellow card) 88'; Cunha (yellow card) 90+14'	Report	Emerson (yellow card) 31'; Paquetá 72' (pen.), (yellow card) 90'; Ward-Prowse 84'	Stadium: Molineux Stadium; Attendance: 31,504 (2,966 away fans); Referee: Tony Harrington

13 April 2024 33	Nottingham Forest	2–2	Wolverhampton Wanderers	West Bridgford
15:00 BST	Gibbs-White 45+1', (yellow card) 77'; Danilo 57'; Murillo (yellow card) 90+5'	Report	Lemina (yellow card) 30'; Cunha 40', 62', (yellow card) 45+2'; João Gomes (yellow card) 52'	Stadium: City Ground; Attendance: 29,604 (2,833 away fans); Referee: Craig Pawson

20 April 2024 34	Wolverhampton Wanderers	0–2	Arsenal	Wolverhampton
19:30 BST	Toti (yellow card) 32'; Kilman (yellow card) 35'; Hwang Hee-chan (yellow card) 51'	Report	Trossard (yellow card) 29', (goal) 45'; Rice (yellow card) 35'; Ødegaard 90+5'	Stadium: Molineux Stadium; Attendance: 31,621 (2,969 away fans); Referee: Paul Tierney
Note: Fixture was initially scheduled for a 15:00 kick-off, but was moved due to Sky Sports coverage.

24 April 2024 29	Wolverhampton Wanderers	0–1	Bournemouth	Wolverhampton
19:45 BST	Semedo (yellow card) 23'; Aït-Nouri (yellow card) 44'; Doherty (yellow card) 61'; Cunha (yellow card) 69'	Report	Semenyo 37'; Kerkez (red card) 79'; Ünal (yellow card) 90+2'	Stadium: Molineux Stadium; Attendance: 25,541 (973 away fans); Referee: Stuart Attwell
Note: Fixture was originally scheduled for 16 March, but was postponed due to Wolverhampton Wanderers' FA Cup involvement.

27 April 2024 35	Wolverhampton Wanderers	2–1	Luton Town	Wolverhampton
15:00 BST	João Gomes (yellow card) 11'; Hwang Hee-chan 39', (yellow card) 81'; Toti 50'; Sarabia (yellow card) 90+5'	Report	Sambi Lokonga (yellow card) 58'; Morris 80'	Stadium: Molineux Stadium; Attendance: 31,531 (2,957 away fans); Referee: David Coote

4 May 2024 36	Manchester City	5–1	Wolverhampton Wanderers	Manchester
17:30 BST	Haaland 12' (pen.), 35', 45+3' (pen.), 54'; Álvarez 85'	Report	Lemina (yellow card) 41'; Semedo (yellow card) 45+2'; Hwang Hee-chan 53'; Traoré (yellow card) 64'; João Gomes (yellow card) 66'	Stadium: City of Manchester Stadium; Attendance: 53,486 (3,005 away fans); Referee: Craig Pawson
Note: Fixture was initially scheduled for a 15:00 kick-off, but was moved for live Sky Sports broadcast.

11 May 2024 37	Wolverhampton Wanderers	1–3	Crystal Palace	Wolverhampton
15:00 BST	Traoré (yellow card) 40'; Cunha 66', (yellow card) 77'; Sarabia (yellow card) 71'	Report	Olise 26'; Mateta 28'; Muñoz (yellow card) 40'; Eze 73'; Ahamada (yellow card) 82' (yellow-red card) 85'; Henderson (yellow card) 83'	Stadium: Molineux Stadium; Attendance: 31,424 (2,942 away fans); Referee: Thomas Bramall

19 May 2024 38	Liverpool	2–0	Wolverhampton Wanderers	Liverpool
15:00 BST	Mac Allister 34'; Quansah 40'; Endō (yellow card) 60'	Report	Semedo (red card) 28'; Toti (yellow card) 45+1'	Stadium: Anfield; Attendance: 60,059 (2,537 away fans); Referee: Chris Kavanagh

=== FA Cup ===
Wolves entered the competition in the third round, and were drawn away to Brentford. They were then drawn away against fierce rivals West Bromwich Albion in the fourth round, at home to Brighton & Hove Albion in the fifth round, and at home to Coventry City in the quarter-finals.

Win Draw Loss Fixtures

5 January 2024 Third round	Brentford	1–1	Wolverhampton Wanderers	Brentford
19:15 GMT	Damsgaard (yellow card) 27'; Roerslev (yellow card) 37'; Maupay 41'; Lewis-Potter (yellow card) 90+5'	Report	João Gomes (red card) 9'; Doyle 64'; S. Bueno (yellow card) 81'; Semedo (yellow card) 90+5'	Stadium: Brentford Community Stadium; Attendance: 16,818 (2,435 away fans); Referee: Tony Harrington

16 January 2024 Third round replay	Wolverhampton Wanderers	3–2 (a.e.t.)	Brentford	Wolverhampton
19:30 GMT	Semedo 36'; Fraser 72'; Cunha 105+5' (pen.); Kilman (yellow card) 115'	Report	Collins 13'; Maupay 52'; Peart-Harris (yellow card) 86'	Stadium: Molineux Stadium; Attendance: 24,692 (417 away fans); Referee: Andrew Madley

28 January 2024 Fourth round	West Bromwich Albion	0–2	Wolverhampton Wanderers	West Bromwich
11:45 GMT	Wallace (yellow card) 54'; Bartley (yellow card) 72'	Report	Neto 38'; Cunha 78'	Stadium: Hawthorns; Attendance: 25,013 (4,011 away fans); Referee: Thomas Bramall
Note: The match was temporarily suspended in the 78th minute due to "fan disorder", with play resuming at 14:00 GMT.

28 February 2024 Fifth round	Wolverhampton Wanderers	1–0	Brighton & Hove Albion	Wolverhampton
19:45 GMT	Lemina 2'; Sarabia (yellow card) 73'; Sá (yellow card) 82'; Neto (yellow card) 89'	Report	Fati (yellow card) 17'; Igor (yellow card) 63'	Stadium: Molineux Stadium; Attendance: 23,822 (1,962 away fans); Referee: Andrew Madley

16 March 2024 Quarter-finals	Wolverhampton Wanderers	2–3	Coventry City	Wolverhampton
12:15 GMT	Aït-Nouri (yellow card) 7', (goal) 83'; Sarabia (yellow card) 81'; H. Bueno 88'	Report	Simms 53', 90+7'; Wright 90+10'; Palmer (yellow card) 90+11'	Stadium: Molineux Stadium; Attendance: 31,262 (4,812 away fans); Referee: Sam Barrott

=== EFL Cup ===
Wolves entered the competition in the second round, and were drawn at home to Blackpool. They were then drawn away to Ipswich Town in the third round.

Win Draw Loss Fixtures

29 August 2023 Second round	Wolverhampton Wanderers	5–0	Blackpool	Wolverhampton
19:45 BST	Kalajdžić 10', (yellow card) 40'; Silva 25'; Doherty 60', 66'; Fraser 84'	Report	Weir (yellow card) 57'	Stadium: Molineux Stadium; Attendance: 20,605 (973 away fans); Referee: Jarred Gillett

26 September 2023 Third round	Ipswich Town	3–2	Wolverhampton Wanderers	Ipswich
19:45 BST	Evans (yellow card) 16'; Hutchinson 28'; Ladapo 39'; Taylor 58'; Aluko (yellow card) 86'; Baggott (yellow card) 88'	Report	Hwang Hee-chan 4', (yellow card) 45'; Traoré (yellow card) 12'; Toti 15'; Cunha (yellow card) 90+1'	Stadium: Portman Road; Attendance: 20,236 (1,938 away fans); Referee: Sam Barrott

=== EFL Trophy ===
The group stage draw was finalised on 22 June 2023.

Pos	Div	Team	Pld	W	PW	PL	L	GF	GA	GD	Pts	Qualification
1	L1	Derby County	3	3	0	0	0	8	2	+6	9	Advance to Round 2
2	L1	Lincoln City	3	2	0	0	1	4	2	+2	6	Advance to Round 2
3	ACA	Wolverhampton Wanderers U21	3	1	0	0	2	3	7	−4	3	
4	L2	Notts County	3	0	0	0	3	2	6	−4	0	

Updated to match(es) played on 8 November 2023. Source: EFL.com

Win Draw Loss Fixtures

12 September 2023 Group stage	Notts County	1–2	Wolverhampton Wanderers U21	Nottingham
19:45 BST	Hubner 90+5' (o.g.)		Hesketh 17'; Fraser 55'	Stadium: Meadow Lane; Attendance: 1,459; Referee: Paul Howard

== Statistics ==
=== Appearances ===
No.	Pos.	Player	Premier League		FA Cup		EFL Cup		Total	
No.	Pos.	Player	Apps	Goals	Apps	Goals	Apps	Goals	Apps	Goals
Goalkeepers
1	GK	(Portugal) José Sá	33	0	5	0	0	0	38	0
25	GK	(England) Dan Bentley	2+2	0	0	0	2	0	4+2	0
Defenders
2	DF	(Republic of Ireland) Matt Doherty	8+20	1	4+1	0	2	2	14+21	3
3	DF	(Algeria) Rayan Aït-Nouri	26+3	2	2+1	1	1+1	0	30+5	3
4	DF	(Uruguay) Santiago Bueno	8+3	0	4	0	1	0	13+3	0
15	DF	(England) Craig Dawson	25	1	1+2	0	0	0	26+2	1
17	DF	(Spain) Hugo Bueno	6+13	0	0+2	1	1+1	0	7+16	1
22	DF	(Portugal) Nélson Semedo	33	0	4+1	1	0	0	36+1	1
23	DF	(England) Max Kilman	35	2	5	0	1	0	40	2
24	DF	(Portugal) Toti	28+4	1	5	0	2	1	35+4	2
46	DF	(England) Alfie Pond	0	0	0	0	0+1	0	0+1	0
Midfielders
5	MF	(Gabon) Mario Lemina	31+1	4	3+1	1	0	0	34+2	5
6	MF	(Mali) Boubacar Traoré	5+16	0	0+1	0	2	0	6+17	0
8	MF	(Brazil) João Gomes	31+1	2	3	0	0+1	0	33+2	2
20	MF	(England) Tommy Doyle	11+13	0	5	1	1	0	17+13	1
21	MF	(Spain) Pablo Sarabia	20+8	4	3+1	0	2	0	25+9	4
27	MF	(France) Jean-Ricner Bellegarde	9+10	2	4	0	0	0	13+10	2
42	MF	(England) Harvey Griffiths	0	0	0	0	0+1	0	0+1	0
62	MF	(Zimbabwe) Tawanda Chirewa	1+6	0	0+2	0	0	0	1+8	0
Forwards
7	FW	(Portugal) Pedro Neto	17+1	2	1+3	1	0	0	18+4	3
11	FW	(South Korea) Hwang Hee-chan	22+4	12	1	0	1	1	24+4	13
12	FW	(Brazil) Matheus Cunha	26+3	12	3	2	0+1	0	29+4	14
63	FW	(Republic of Ireland) Nathan Fraser	1+6	0	1+1	1	0+2	1	2+7	2
84	FW	(England) Leon Chiwome	2+1	0	0+1	0	0	0	2+2	0
Transferred/Loaned
19	DF	(Spain) Jonny	0+1	0	0	0	2	0	2+1	0
27	MF	(Portugal) Matheus Nunes	2	0	0	0	0	0	2	0
9	FW	(Portugal) Fábio Silva	4+4	0	0	0	1+1	1	5+5	1
18	FW	(Austria) Saša Kalajdžić	1+10	2	0	0	2	1	3+10	3
32	MF	(Republic of Ireland) Joe Hodge	0	0	1	0	1	0	2	0

Source: Premier League

=== Goalscorers ===
The list is sorted by shirt number when total goals are equal.

Rnk	Pos	No.	Player	Premier League	FA Cup	EFL Cup	Total
1	FW	12	(Brazil) Matheus Cunha	12	2	0	14
2	FW	11	(South Korea) Hwang Hee-chan	12	0	1	13
3	MF	5	(Gabon) Mario Lemina	4	1	0	5
4	MF	21	(Spain) Pablo Sarabia	4	0	0	4
5	DF	2	(Republic of Ireland) Matt Doherty	1	0	2	3
5	DF	3	(Algeria) Rayan Aït-Nouri	2	1	0	3
5	FW	7	(Portugal) Pedro Neto	2	1	0	3
5	FW	18	(Austria) Saša Kalajdžić	2	0	1	3
6	DF	8	(Brazil) João Gomes	2	0	0	2
6	DF	15	(England) Craig Dawson	2	0	0	2
6	DF	23	(England) Max Kilman	2	0	0	2
6	DF	24	(Portugal) Toti	1	0	1	2
6	MF	27	(France) Jean-Ricner Bellegarde	2	0	0	2
6	FW	63	(Republic of Ireland) Nathan Fraser	0	1	1	2
7	FW	9	(Portugal) Fábio Silva	0	0	1	1
7	DF	17	(Spain) Hugo Bueno	0	1	0	1
7	FW	20	(England) Tommy Doyle	0	1	0	1
7	DF	22	(Portugal) Nélson Semedo	0	1	0	1
Total				43	6	7	56

Source: Premier League

=== Disciplinary ===
The list is sorted by shirt number when total cards are equal.

Rnk	Pos	No.	Name	Premier League			FA Cup			EFL Cup			Total		
Rnk	Pos	No.	Name	Yellow card	Second yellow card	Red card	Yellow card	Second yellow card	Red card	Yellow card	Second yellow card	Red card	Yellow card	Second yellow card	Red card
1	MF	8	(Brazil) João Gomes	11	0	0	0	0	1	0	0	0	11	0	1
2	DF	22	(Portugal) Nélson Semedo	10	0	0	1	0	0	0	0	0	11	0	0
3	MF	5	(Gabon) Mario Lemina	9	1	0	0	0	0	0	0	0	9	1	0
3	FW	12	(Brazil) Matheus Cunha	8	0	0	0	0	0	1	0	0	9	0	0
4	DF	3	(Algeria) Rayan Aït-Nouri	7	0	0	1	0	0	0	0	0	8	0	0
4	DF	23	(England) Max Kilman	7	0	0	1	0	0	0	0	0	8	0	0
5	FW	11	(South Korea) Hwang Hee-chan	6	0	0	0	0	0	1	0	0	7	0	0
6	DF	15	(England) Craig Dawson	6	0	0	0	0	0	0	0	0	6	0	0
6	MF	21	(Spain) Pablo Sarabia	4	0	0	2	0	0	0	0	0	6	0	0
7	FW	7	(Portugal) Pedro Neto	4	0	0	1	0	0	0	0	0	5	0	0
7	MF	24	(Portugal) Toti	5	0	0	0	0	0	0	0	0	5	0	0
8	MF	6	(Mali) Boubacar Traoré	2	0	0	0	0	0	1	0	0	3	0	0
9	GK	1	(Portugal) José Sá	1	0	0	1	0	0	0	0	0	2	0	0
9	DF	2	(Republic of Ireland) Matt Doherty	2	0	0	0	0	0	0	0	0	2	0	0
9	DF	4	(Uruguay) Santiago Bueno	1	0	0	1	0	0	0	0	0	2	0	0
9	FW	9	(Portugal) Fábio Silva	2	0	0	0	0	0	0	0	0	2	0	0
9	MF	20	(England) Tommy Doyle	2	0	0	0	0	0	0	0	0	2	0	0
9	MF	27	(Portugal) Matheus Nunes	1	1	0	0	0	0	0	0	0	1	1	0
10	DF	17	(Spain) Hugo Bueno	1	0	0	0	0	0	0	0	0	1	0	0
10	FW	18	(Austria) Saša Kalajdžić	0	0	0	0	0	0	1	0	0	1	0	0
10	MF	27	(France) Jean-Ricner Bellegarde	0	0	1	0	0	0	0	0	0	0	0	1
10	MF	62	(Zimbabwe) Tawanda Chirewa	1	0	0	0	0	0	0	0	0	1	0	0
Total				86	2	1	6	0	1	4	0	0	97	2	2

Source: Premier League

=== Clean sheets ===
The list is sorted by shirt number when total clean sheets are equal.

Rnk	No.	Player	Premier League	FA Cup	EFL Cup	Total
1	1	(Portugal) José Sá	4	2	0	6
2	25	(England) Dan Bentley	1	0	1	2
Total			5	0	1	7

Source: Premier League

== Club awards ==
=== Player of the Month award ===
Voted for by fans on Wolverhampton Wanderers' official website.

Month	Player
August	(Austria) Saša Kalajdžić
September	(Portugal) Pedro Neto
October	(South Korea) Hwang Hee-chan
November	(Gabon) Mario Lemina
December	(Gabon) Mario Lemina
January	(Brazil) Matheus Cunha
February	(Brazil) João Gomes
March	Not Awarded
April	Not Awarded
