= Saša Kalajdžić =

Austrian footballer (born 1997)

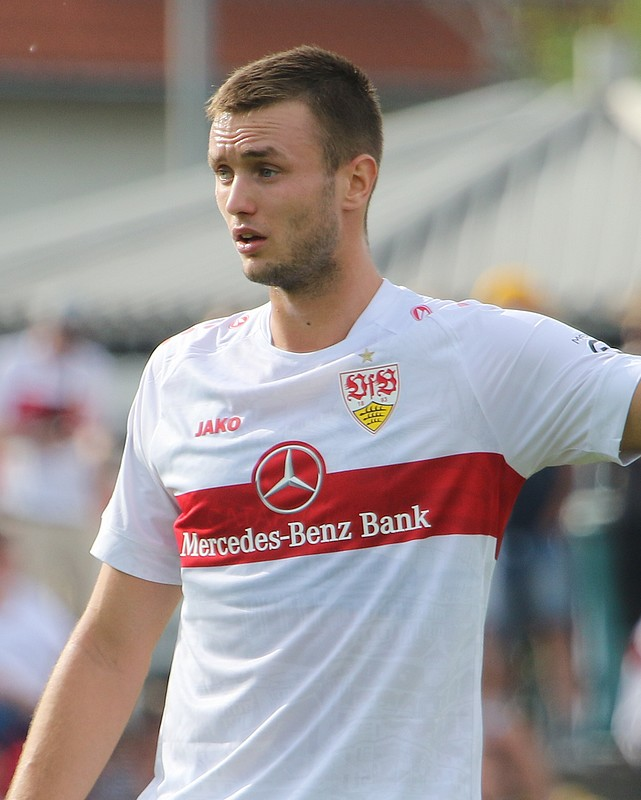
- Kalajdžić with VfB Stuttgart in 2022

Personal information
- Full name: Saša Kalajdžić
- Date of birth: 7 July 1997 (age 29)
- Place of birth: Vienna, Austria
- Height: 2.00 m (6 ft 7 in)
- Position: Striker

Team information
- Current team: LASK
- Number: 11

Youth career
- 2004–2006: SV Donau
- 2006–2010: SR Donaufeld Wien
- 2010–2014: First Vienna FC
- 2014–2015: SR Donaufeld Wien

Senior career*
Years	Team	Apps	(Gls)
2015–2016	SR Donaufeld Wien	18	(7)
2016–2018	Admira Wacker II	33	(13)
2017–2019	Admira Wacker	33	(11)
2019–2022	VfB Stuttgart	57	(23)
2022–2026	Wolverhampton Wanderers	13	(2)
2024	→ Eintracht Frankfurt (loan)	5	(0)
2025–2026	→ LASK (loan)	22	(6)
2026–	LASK	5	(1)

International career^{‡}
2017–2019	Austria U21	6	(0)
2020–	Austria	31	(8)
- * Club domestic league appearances and goals as of 19:04, 25 October 2026 (UTC) ‡ National team caps and goals as of 22:22, 17 November 2026 (UTC)

Saša Kalajdžić (Serbian Cyrillic: Саша Калајџић; born 7 July 1997) is an Austrian professional footballer who plays as a striker for Austrian Bundesliga club LASK and the Austria national team.

Kalajdžić began his senior career in the third and fourth tiers of Austrian football with SR Donaufeld Wien. In 2016, he signed for Austrian Bundesliga club Admira Wacker, where he scored twelve goals in 35 matches for the first team. Kalajdžić joined German club VfB Stuttgart in July 2019, only to sustain a serious knee injury shortly after joining and not making his debut until May 2020. However, he went on to score 24 goals in 60 matches for the club. In August 2022, Kalajdžić was signed by English club Wolverhampton Wanderers for a reported fee of £15 million.

Kalajdžić played for Austria at under-21 level before making his senior international debut in October 2020. He was part of Austria's squad at the UEFA Euro 2020 and 2026 FIFA World Cup.

== Club career ==
=== FC Admira Wacker Mödling ===
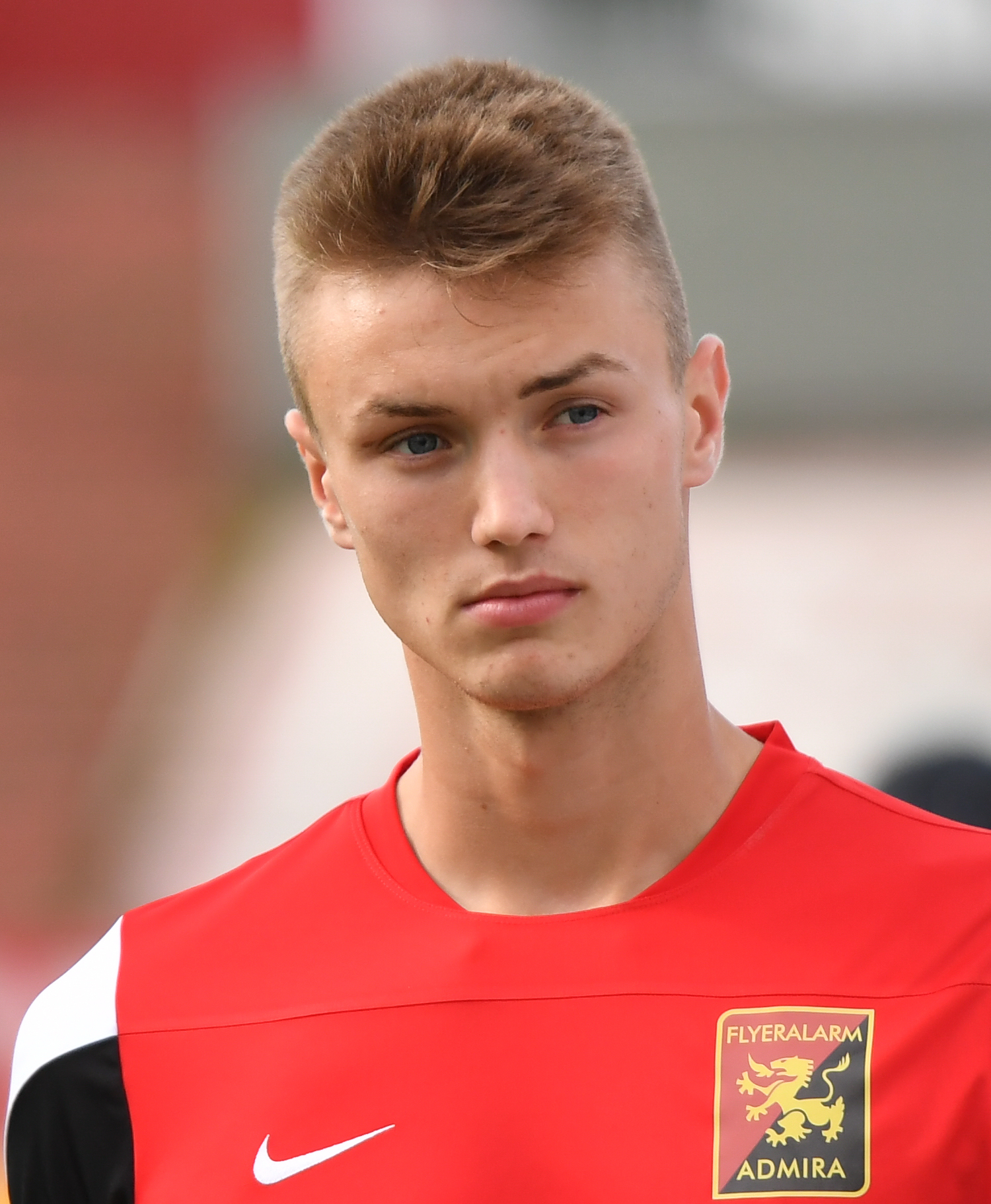
Kalajdžić with Admira Wacker in 2017

Born in the Austrian capital Vienna, Kalajdžić joined FC Admira Wacker Mödling in 2016, from SR Donaufeld Wien. He originally played as a midfielder for the club's reserve side in the Austrian Regionalliga East, before being converted into a forward.

=== VfB Stuttgart ===
On 5 July 2019, Kalajdžić signed a four-year contract with German club VfB Stuttgart. Shortly after his arrival, he suffered a torn cruciate ligament during a preseason training camp. He made his league debut on 28 May 2020, coming on as a substitute in the 78th minute of Matchday 28 of the 2019–20 2. Bundesliga season against Hamburger SV, and scored his first goal on Matchday 33 during a 6–0 victory against FC Nuremberg.

The following season, Kalajdžić frequently led the line for VfB Stuttgart, finishing the season as the sixth top scorer in the Bundesliga with 16 goals, helping the club finished ninth place. The next season, he scored the winner in Stuttgart's 3–2 victory against Borussia Mönchengladbach on Matchday 25, and the team's first goal in a 2–1 victory against 1. FC Köln on the final matchday, leading the club's presence in the Bundesliga for the 2022–23 season.

=== Wolverhampton Wanderers ===
On 31 August 2022, Kalajdžić signed for English club Wolverhampton Wanderers on a five-year contract with the option to extend for a further year. The fee was undisclosed by the club, but was reported to be £15 million. He made his Premier League debut three days later as a starter in a 1–0 victory against Southampton at Molineux, but was replaced at half-time due to injury, which was later confirmed as an ACL tear that required surgery. Wolves subsequently announced that Kalajdžić underwent reparative surgery on 6 September and warned that the typical rehabilitation period after such a procedure was nine months.

In an away league match against Manchester United on 14 August 2023, Kalajdžić made his second appearance for Wolves – as well as first since 3 September 2022 – as a late substitute. Again, he entered the field as a late substitute against Everton on 26 August and proceeded to score his first goal for Wolves in the 87th minute to help them win 1–0 at Goodison Park. Kalajdžić scored his second goal for Wolves in his next match, as well as his first start for the club since 3 September 2022, a home one in the EFL Cup against Blackpool on 29 August 2023 in which Wolves won 5–0. In a 2–1 away victory against Bournemouth on 21 October 2023, Kalajdžić scored his second Premier League goal as a substitute again in a 2–1 Wolves.

==== Loan to Eintracht Frankfurt ====
On 7 January 2024, Kalajdžić was sent on loan to Bundesliga club Eintracht Frankfurt until the end of the 2023–24 season. On 15 February, he scored his first goal for the club in a 2–2 away draw against Union Saint-Gilloise during the Conference League knockout round play-offs. On 18 February, Kalajdžić suffered a third ACL tear in the span of five years in a Bundesliga match against SC Freiburg.

==== Return to Wolverhampton and loan to LASK ====
Kalajdžić missed the entire 2024–25 season due to his ACL injury.

On 5 September 2025, Kalajdžić went on loan for the second time, this time to Austrian club LASK. On 30 January 2026, he scored his first goal for the club in a 3–2 victory over Blau-Weiß Linz in the Austrian Cup. Later that year, on 26 April, he netted a brace, including a goal from his own half, and provided an assist in a 5–1 away victory against TSV Hartberg.

=== Return to LASK ===
On 30 August 2026, Kalajdžić rejoined LASK on a permanent transfer, signing a three-year contract.

== International career ==
Kalajdžić made six appearances for Austria at under-21 level. He made his senior international debut for Austria on 14 October 2020, in a Nations League 1–0 victory against Romania, as an extra-time substitute for Michael Gregoritsch.

On 25 March 2021, Kalajdžić scored his first two international goals in a 2–2 away draw with Scotland during 2022 FIFA World Cup qualification. He was included in the squad for Euro 2020, scoring a goal in a 2–1 loss after extra-time against Italy in the round of 16.

On 18 May 2026, Kalajdžić was selected in Ralf Rangnick’s 26-man squad for the 2026 FIFA World Cup, marking Austria's first appearance in the tournament since 1998. One month later, on 27 June, he scored his first World Cup goal in the stoppage time, equalising in a 3–3 draw against Algeria and securing his country's qualification for the knockout stage.

== Style of play ==
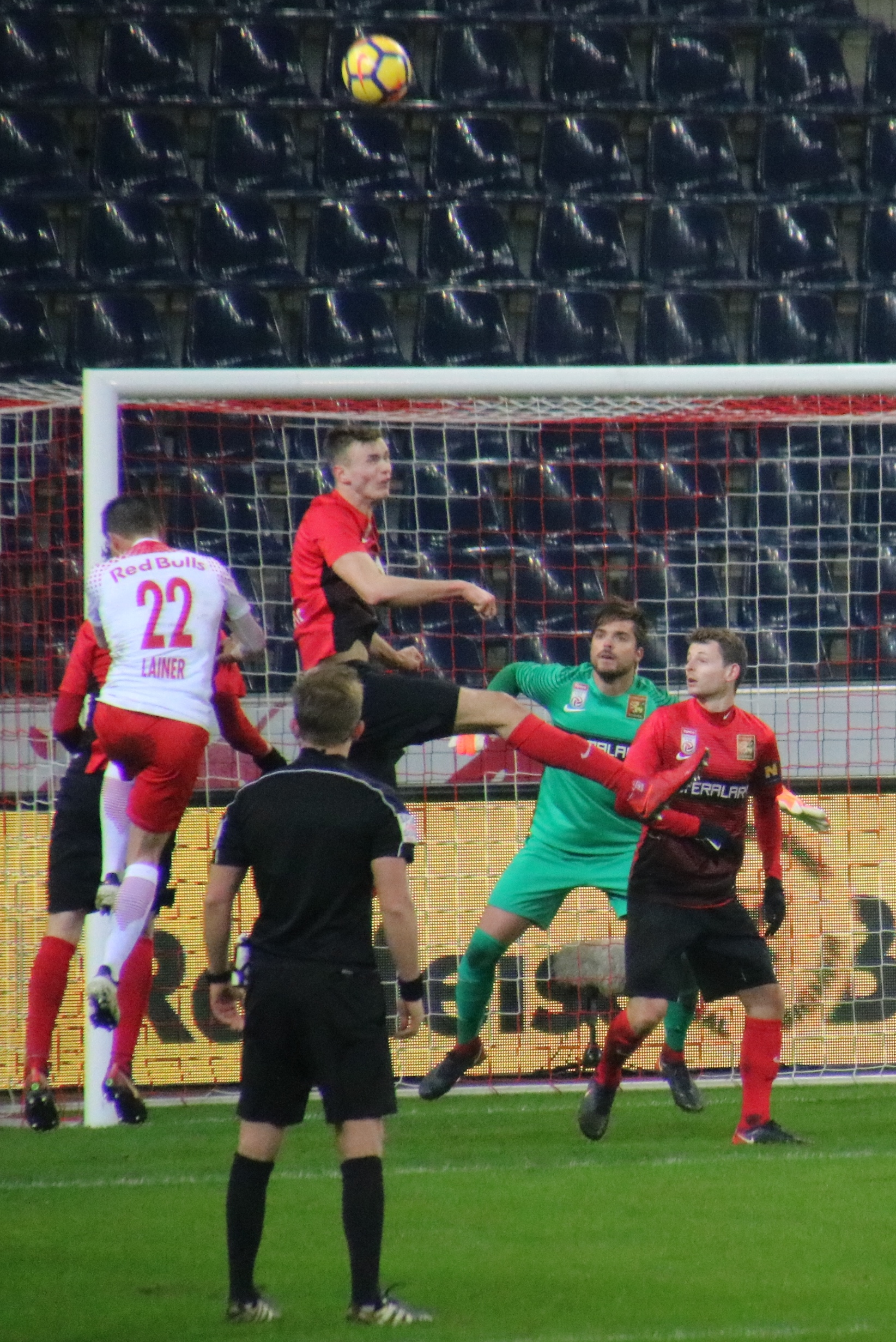
Kalajdžić jumping for a header in 2018

Due to his two-metre stature and relatively slender build, Kalajdžić received comparisons with the English striker Peter Crouch, who similarly to him functioned as an out-and-out target man. During his youth career, Kalajdžić also played as a holding midfielder and referred to Nemanja Matić as an inspiration.

== Personal life ==
Born in Austria, Kalajdžić is of Serbian descent.

== Career statistics ==
=== Club ===
As of match played 3 November 2026

Appearances and goals by club, season and competition
Club	Season	League			National cup (Note: Includes Austrian Cup, DFB-Pokal)		League cup (Note: Includes EFL Cup)		Europe		Total	
Club	Season	Division	Apps	Goals	Apps	Goals	Apps	Goals	Apps	Goals	Apps	Goals
SR Donaufeld Wien	2014–15	Austrian Regionalliga East	2	0	0	0	—		—		2	0
SR Donaufeld Wien	2015–16	Wiener Stadtliga	16	7	0	0	—		—		16	7
SR Donaufeld Wien	Total		18	7	0	0	—		—		18	7
Admira Wacker Amateure	2016–17	Austrian Regionalliga East	27	10	—		—		—		27	10
Admira Wacker Amateure	2017–18	Austrian Regionalliga East	3	3	—		—		—		3	3
Admira Wacker Amateure	2018–19	Austrian Regionalliga East	3	0	—		—		—		3	0
Admira Wacker Amateure	Total		33	13	—		—		—		33	13
Admira Wacker	2017–18	Austrian Bundesliga	18	3	2	1	—		—		20	4
Admira Wacker	2018–19	Austrian Bundesliga	15	8	0	0	—		0	0	15	8
Admira Wacker	Total		33	11	2	1	—		0	0	35	12
VfB Stuttgart	2019–20	2. Bundesliga	6	1	0	0	—		—		6	1
VfB Stuttgart	2020–21	Bundesliga	33	16	3	1	—		—		36	17
VfB Stuttgart	2021–22	Bundesliga	15	6	0	0	—		—		15	6
VfB Stuttgart	2022–23	Bundesliga	3	0	0	0	—		—		3	0
VfB Stuttgart	Total		57	23	3	1	—		—		60	24
Wolverhampton Wanderers	2022–23	Premier League	1	0	0	0	0	0	—		1	0
Wolverhampton Wanderers	2023–24	Premier League	11	2	0	0	2	1	—		13	3
Wolverhampton Wanderers	2025–26	Premier League	1	0	—		1	0	—		2	0
Wolverhampton Wanderers	Total		13	2	0	0	3	1	—		16	3
Eintracht Frankfurt (loan)	2023–24	Bundesliga	5	0	—		—		1 (Note: Appearance in UEFA Europa Conference League)	1	6	1
LASK (loan)	2025–26	Austrian Bundesliga	22	6	4	1	—		—		26	7
LASK	2026–27	Austrian Bundesliga	5	1	1	0	—		4 (Note: Appearances in UEFA Champions League)	1	10	2
Career total			186	63	10	3	3	1	5	2	204	69

=== International ===
As of match played 17 November 2026

Appearances and goals by national team and year
National team	Year	Apps	Goals
Austria	2020	2	0
Austria	2021	9	4
Austria	2022	4	0
Austria	2023	4	0
Austria	2024	0	0
Austria	2025	0	0
Austria	2026	12	4
Total		31	8

Scores and results list Austria's goal tally first. Score column indicates score after each Kalajdžić goal.

List of international goals scored by Saša Kalajdžić
No.	Date	Venue	Cap	Opponent	Score	Result	Competition	Ref.
1	25 March 2021	Hampden Park, Glasgow, Scotland	3	Scotland	1–0	2–2	2022 FIFA World Cup qualification	
2	25 March 2021	Hampden Park, Glasgow, Scotland	3	Scotland	2–1	2–2	2022 FIFA World Cup qualification	
3	28 March 2021	Ernst-Happel-Stadion, Vienna, Austria	4	Faroe Islands	3–1	3–1	2022 FIFA World Cup qualification	
4	26 June 2021	Wembley Stadium, London, England	11	Italy	1–2	1–2 (a.e.t.)	UEFA Euro 2020	
5	27 June 2026	Arrowhead Stadium, Kansas City, United States	24	Algeria	3–3	3–3	2026 FIFA World Cup	
6	24 September 2026	Raiffeisen Arena, Linz, Austria	26	Israel	3–1	3–1	2026–27 UEFA Nations League B	
7	14 November 2026	Raiffeisen Arena, Linz, Austria	30	Republic of Ireland	1–0	1–0	2026–27 UEFA Nations League B	
8	17 November 2026	Nagyerdei Stadion, Debrecen, Hungary	31	Israel	1–1	1–1	2026–27 UEFA Nations League B	

== Honours ==
LASK

- Austrian Bundesliga: 2025–26
- Austrian Cup: 2025–26

Individual

- Wolverhampton Wanderers Player of the Month: August 2023
