= Harvey Griffiths =

English footballer

Personal information
- Full name: Harvey Lawson Griffiths
- Date of birth: 22 September 2003 (age 23)
- Position: Midfielder

Team information
- Current team: Worthing
- Number: 14

Youth career
- –2021: Manchester City
- 2021–2023: Wolverhampton Wanderers

Senior career*
Years	Team	Apps	(Gls)
2023–2026	Wolverhampton Wanderers	0	(0)
2023–2024	→ Walsall (loan)	1	(0)
2025–2026	→ Crewe Alexandra (loan)	0	(0)
2026–	Worthing	0	(0)
- * Club domestic league appearances and goals as of 09:35, 18 October 2026 (UTC)

Harvey Lawson Griffiths (born 22 September 2003) is an English professional footballer who plays as a midfielder for National League club Worthing.

== Career ==
=== Manchester City ===
Griffiths was in the youth academy of Manchester City from under-9 level. He progressed through the academy and played for their under-18 team and also for the under 23 team

=== Wolverhampton Wanderers ===
In August 2021, Griffiths signed for Wolverhampton Wanderers for a fee of £350,000. In the summer of 2023, he signed a three-year contract extension with the club. He made his professional debut on 29 August 2023 in the EFL Cup, at home for Wolves against Blackpool.

On 1 September 2023, he joined Walsall on a season-long loan. Having made just four appearances in all competitions, his loan was ended early on 2 January 2024.

On 1 September 2025, he joined Crewe Alexandra on a development loan until 1 January 2026.

On 6 June 2026, Wolves announced that Griffiths would leave the club upon expiry of his contract.

=== Worthing ===
On 17 October 2026, Griffiths joined National League club Worthing.

== Style of play ==
He has been described as a defensive midfielder, and compared in style to Mario Lemina.
