= Nathan Fraser =

Irish footballer

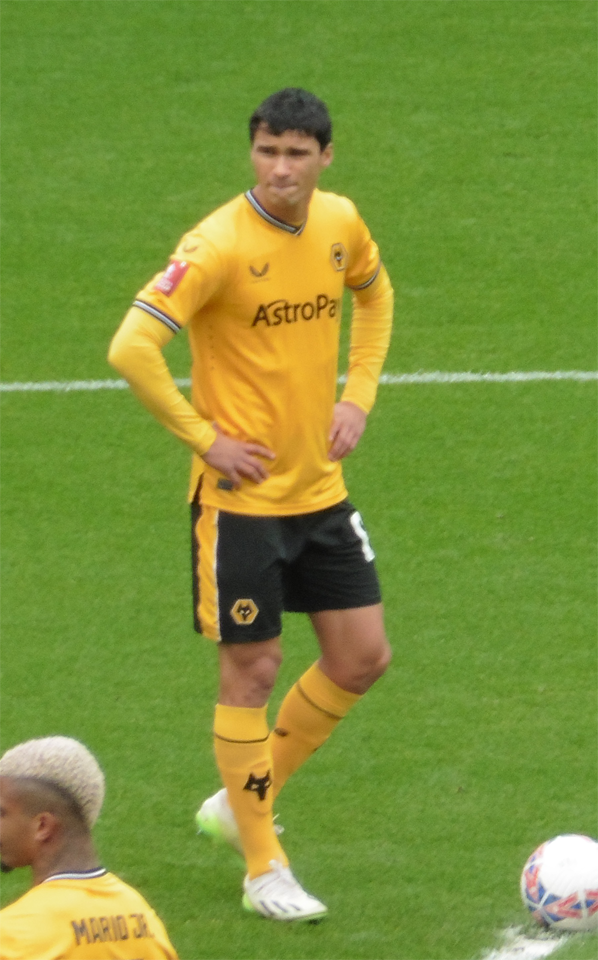
- Fraser playing for Wolverhampton Wanderers in 2024

Personal information
- Full name: Nathan John Mark Fraser
- Date of birth: 22 February 2005 (age 21)
- Place of birth: Wolverhampton, England
- Position: Striker

Team information
- Current team: Wolverhampton Wanderers
- Number: 63

Youth career
- 2011–2012: Trysull Tigers
- 2012–2024: Wolverhampton Wanderers

Senior career*
Years	Team	Apps	(Gls)
2024–	Wolverhampton Wanderers	7	(0)
2024	→ Zulte Waregem (loan)	4	(0)

International career
2022	Republic of Ireland U19	4	(1)
- * Club domestic league appearances and goals as of 23:57, 02 January 2025 (UTC)

Nathan John Mark Fraser (born 22 February 2005) is a professional footballer who plays as a striker for Premier League side Wolverhampton Wanderers. Born in England, he is a Republic of Ireland youth international.

== Early life ==
From Tettenhall, Wolverhampton, Fraser started at the Wolves academy when he was seven years-old.

== Club career ==
=== Wolverhampton Wanderers ===
Fraser signed his first professional contract with Wolves in February 2022 and began training with the Wolves first team squad during the 2022–23 season. He made the Wolves first-team squad for the first time for a Premier League match against Brighton & Hove Albion, as an unused substitute, on 5 November 2022. He featured for Wolves in the EFL Trophy, impressing against Manchester United on 22 November 2022, even though Wolves ultimately lost the game on penalties.

In June 2023, he signed a new contract with the club keeping him at Molineux until 2025. He made his professional debut on 29 August 2023 in the second round of the EFL Cup at home against Blackpool, scoring the final goal in a 5–0 win.

Fraser scored his first FA Cup goal within three minutes of his competition debut as a second-half substitute in a 3–2 Third Round replay victory over Brentford at Molineux on 16 January 2024.

Fraser made his Premier League debut as a late substitute in a 4–3 home loss to Manchester United on 1 February 2024 and made his first appearance as a starter in the Premier League in a 2–1 home win against Fulham on 9 March 2024.

==== Loan to Zulte Waregem ====
On 19 August 2024, Fraser joined Challenger Pro League side Zulte Waregem on a season-long loan for the 2024–25 season. He made his league debut in a 2–2 draw against Deinze as an 80th-minute substitute for Jeppe Erenbjerg in Zulte Waregem's first away game of the 2024–25 season on 25 August 2024. After making just 4 substitute appearances in the league, Fraser returned to Wolves early.

== International career ==
Fraser received his first call up to the Republic of Ireland U19 side in May 2022. He made a goalscoring debut for the Ireland under-19 team on the 22 November 2022, in a 6–0 win over Gibraltar U-19. In the spring of 2024 he reportedly turned down call-ups from the Republic of Ireland U21 side in favour of rest.

== Style of play ==
Fraser has been described as a strong and physical centre-forward. Playing in the Premier League 2 during the 2022–23 season he scored seven goals and they were split evenly between his right foot (two), left foot (two) and head (three).

== Career statistics ==
As of match played 24 November 2024

Appearances and goals by club, season and competition
Club	Season	League			FA Cup		EFL Cup		Other		Total	
Club	Season	Division	Apps	Goals	Apps	Goals	Apps	Goals	Apps	Goals	Apps	Goals
Wolverhampton Wanderers	2023–24	Premier League	7	0	2	1	2	1	—		11	2
Zulte Waregem	2024–25	Challenger Pro League	4	0	1	0	0	0	—		5	0
Career total			11	0	3	1	2	1	0	0	16	2
