= Noha Lemina =

Gabonese footballer (born 2005)

Personal information
- Full name: Pascal Georges Noha Lemina
- Date of birth: 17 June 2005 (age 21)
- Place of birth: Libreville, Gabon
- Height: 1.72 m (5 ft 8 in)
- Position: Midfielder

Team information
- Current team: Manisa
- Number: 11

Youth career
- 2012–2014: AF Garenne-Colombes
- 2014–2023: Paris Saint-Germain

Senior career*
Years	Team	Apps	(Gls)
2023–2024	Paris Saint-Germain	0	(0)
2023–2024	→ Sampdoria (loan)	1	(0)
2024	→ Wolverhampton Wanderers (loan)	0	(0)
2024–2025	Annecy	6	(0)
2025–2026	Yverdon-Sport	16	(2)
2026–	Manisa	6	(0)

International career^{‡}
2021–2022	France U17	7	(0)
2025–	Gabon	7	(0)
- * Club domestic league appearances and goals as of 20 September 2026 ‡ National team caps and goals as of 20:15, 30 March 2026 (UTC)

Pascal Georges Noha Lemina (born 17 June 2005) is a Gabonese professional footballer who plays as a midfielder for TFF 1. Lig club Manisa in Turkey and the Gabon national team.

== Club career ==
=== Early career ===
Born in Libreville, Gabon, Lemina first played football at La Garenne-Colombes, Île-de-France, before entering Paris Saint-Germain's subsidiaries as early as 2014. He officially joined the PSG academy in 2018, where he would sign an aspirant contract two years later.

Discovering the Youth League as soon as 2021, Lemina established himself as a standout with PSG under-19s the following year, signing his first professional contract with the club in October 2022.

During the summer 2023, after replacing Kang-in Lee during a 2–0 friendly win to Le Havre, Lemina started the following friendly against Cristiano Ronaldo's Al Nassr. The only player left on the field for the entirety of the game by newly arrived coach Luis Enrique, the young winger was identified by most media as the best player of that star-studded team, in the absence of Kylian Mbappé.

On 24 August 2023, Lemina joined Serie B club Sampdoria on a season-long loan. On 31 January 2024, he joined Premier League club Wolverhampton Wanderers on loan until the end of the season. The deal reportedly included a €1 million purchase option unilaterally exercisable by Lemina himself, with PSG retaining a 25% sell-on clause in the case of a sale.

=== Annecy ===
On 30 July 2024, Lemina signed for Ligue 2 club Annecy on a three-year contract.

=== Yverdon-Sport ===
On 10 September 2025, Lemina joined Swiss Challenge League club Yverdon-Sport FC, on a one-year contract with option to extend it with two more.

== International career ==
Lemina was a youth international for France, playing with the under-17 between 2021 and 2022.

In February 2025, FIFA approved his change of association from France to Gabon. He debuted with the Gabon national team in a friendly 2–0 win over Guinea-Bissau on 8 June 2025.

== Style of play ==
Growing as an attacking midfielder, Lemina soon proved to be a versatile footballer, also playing as a number 10, as a winger or even as a central midfielder.

== Personal life ==
Lemina was born in Gabon to a Gabonese father and French mother. He holds both French and Gabonese nationalities. He is the younger brother of Mario Lemina, with whom he has played at Wolves.

== Career statistics ==
=== Club ===
As of match played 11 April 2026

Appearances and goals by club, season and competition
Club	Season	League			National cup		Europe		Other		Total	
Club	Season	Division	Apps	Goals	Apps	Goals	Apps	Goals	Apps	Goals	Apps	Goals
Sampdoria (loan)	2022–23	Serie B	1	0	0	0	—		—		1	0
Wolverhampton Wanderers (loan)	2023–24	Premier League	0	0	0	0	—		0	0	0	0
Annecy	2024–25	Ligue 2	6	0	2	0	—		—		8	0
Yverdon-Sport	2025–26	Swiss Challenge League	16	2	3	0	—		—		19	2
Career total			23	2	5	0	0	0	0	0	28	2

=== International ===
As of match played 30 March 2026

Appearances and goals by national team and year
National team	Year	Apps	Goals
Gabon	2025	5	0
Gabon	2026	2	0
Total		7	0
