= Anthony Bermont =

French footballer (born 2005)

Personal information
- Date of birth: 10 February 2005 (age 21)
- Place of birth: Beauvais, France
- Height: 1.87 m (6 ft 2 in)
- Position: Winger

Team information
- Current team: Angers (on loan from Lens)
- Number: 26

Youth career
- 2011–2012: AS Noailles-Cauvigny
- 2012–2019: Beauvais
- 2019–2020: Chambly
- 2020–2022: Lens

Senior career*
Years	Team	Apps	(Gls)
2022–2024	Lens II	27	(6)
2024–	Lens	10	(0)
2024–2025	→ Annecy (loan)	29	(2)
2026–	→ Angers (loan)	0	(0)

International career^{‡}
2025–	France U20	8	(1)
- * Club domestic league appearances and goals as of 17 May 2026 ‡ National team caps and goals as of 23:30, 18 October 2025 (UTC)

Anthony Bermont (born 10 February 2005) is a French professional footballer who plays as a winger for Ligue 1 club Angers on loan from Lens.

== Career ==
Bermont is a product of the youth academies of the French clubs AS Noailles-Cauvigny, Beauvais, Chambly, and Lens, before promoting to Lens' reserves in 2022. On 19 August 2024, he signed his first professional contract with Lens until 2027, and was immediately loan out to Ligue 2 club Annecy for the 2024–25 season. He was named the 2024–25 Ligue 2 Rookie of the Season for his stint at Annecy.

For the 2026–27 season, Bermont joined Angers on loan.

== Career statistics ==
As of match played 8 May 2026

Appearances and goals by club, season and competition
Club	Season	League			Cup		Europe		Other		Total	
Club	Season	Division	Apps	Goals	Apps	Goals	Apps	Goals	Apps	Goals	Apps	Goals
Lens II	2022–23	National 3	3	1	—		—		—		3	1
Lens II	2023–24	National 3	24	5	—		—		—		24	5
Lens II	Total		27	6	—		—		—		27	6
Annecy (loan)	2024–25	Ligue 2	29	2	4	0	—		—		33	2
Lens	2025–26	Ligue 1	10	0	1	0	—		—		11	0
Career total			66	8	5	0	0	0	0	0	71	8

== Honours ==
Individual

- 2024–25 Ligue 2 Rookie of the Season
