= Panos Katseris =

Greek footballer

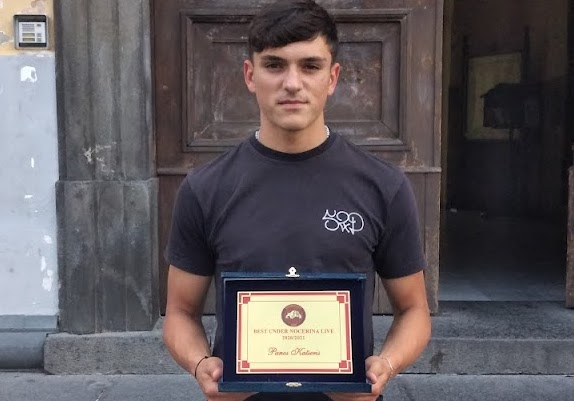

Personal information
- Date of birth: 5 July 2001 (age 25)
- Place of birth: Athens, Greece
- Height: 1.87 m (6 ft 2 in)
- Positions: Right-back; right wing-back

Team information
- Current team: Lorient
- Number: 77

Senior career*
Years	Team	Apps	(Gls)
2019–2020	Pavia		
2020–2021	Nocerina	29	(2)
2021–2022	Cavese	5	(1)
2022	Nuova Florida	18	(6)
2022–2024	Catanzaro	30	(1)
2024–	Lorient	53	(6)
- * Club domestic league appearances and goals as of 19 May 2026

Panos Katseris (Greek: Πάνος Κατσέρης, Greek pronunciation: [pá:nos ka:t͡sé:ris]; born 5 July 2001) is a Greek professional footballer who plays as a right-back or a right wing-back for Ligue 1 club Lorient.

== Club career ==
=== Early career ===
Born in Athens, Katseris started playing football in the Greek amateur leagues, before joining Eccellenza side Pavia in 2019, aged 18.

In September 2020, he joined Serie D side Nocerina on a free transfer. Throughout his only season with the club, he scored two goals and contributed six assists in 29 appearances and was voted as the "Best Underage" player that season.

On 25 August 2021, Katseris officially joined Serie D club Cavese on a free transfer. After making just six appearances in the first part of the campaign, he joined fellow fourth-tier side Nuova Florida on 3 February 2022. Under head coach Andrea Bussone, he became a key starter in the second half of the season, scoring six goals and providing one assist in 18 matches across all competitions and helping the team achieve a third-place finish in Group G and reach the promotion play-offs.

=== Catanzaro ===
Following a successful trial with Serie C side Catanzaro, Katseris officially joined the club on a free transfer on 19 August 2022, signing a three-year professional contract. He made his professional debut on 8 October 2022, coming on as a second-half substitute in a 4–0 league win over Fidelis Andria. On 18 December, he scored his first goal for the Italian club, scoring within a minute of kick-off in a league match against Potenza, and thus contributing to a 6–1 victory. He scored one goal and three assists in 18 matches during his first season with the club, helping Catanzaro win automatic promotion to the Serie B.

During the first half of the 2023–24 campaign in Serie B, following an injury to Mario Šitum, Katseris established himself as a regular starter for Catanzaro, under manager Vincenzo Vivarini; thanks to his performances, he reportedly attracted interest from various Serie B and Serie A clubs.

=== Lorient ===
On 23 January 2024, Katseris joined Ligue 1 side Lorient for an undisclosed fee, reported to be in the region of €2.4 million, plus €600.000 in add-ons, signing a four-year-and-a-half contract with the French club. In the process, he became Lorient's first Greek player. He made his debut for Les Merlus five days later, starting in a 3–3 league draw against Le Havre. On 4 February, he scored his first goal for Lorient, netting the winner in a 2–1 league win away at Metz. Lorient was relegated to the Ligue 2 at the end of the 2023–24 campaign. and was promoted to the Ligue 1 at the end of the 2024-2025 campaign.

== Honours ==
Lorient

- Ligue 2: 2024–25
