= Mario Lemina =

Gabonese footballer (born 1993)

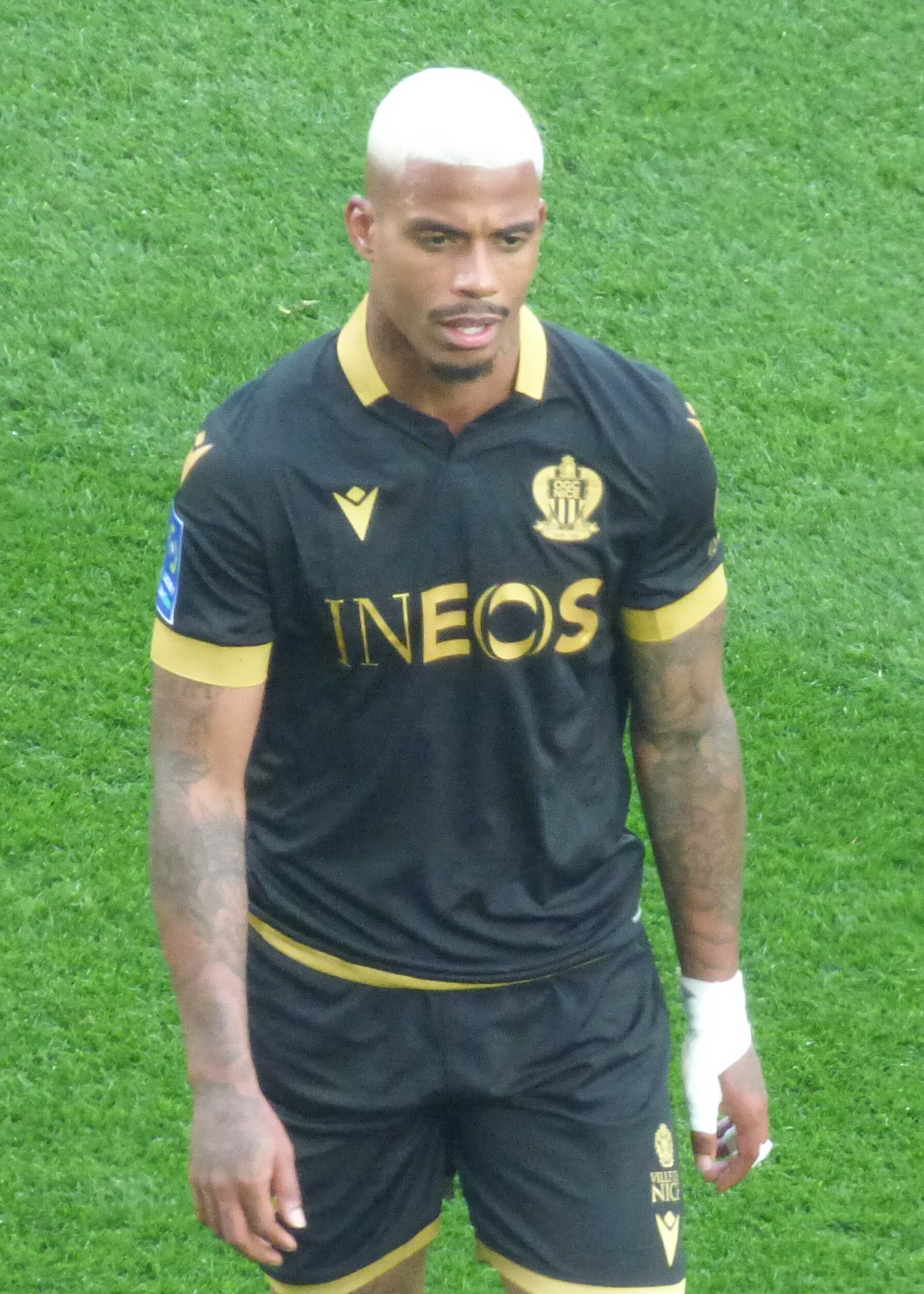
- Lemina with Nice in 2022

Personal information
- Full name: Mario René Junior Lemina
- Date of birth: 1 September 1993 (age 33)
- Place of birth: Libreville, Gabon
- Height: 1.84 m (6 ft 0 in)
- Position: Defensive midfielder

Team information
- Current team: Galatasaray
- Number: 99

Youth career
- 2000–2004: ES Nanterre
- 2004–2006: FC Rueil-Malmaison 92
- 2006–2009: AF Garenne-Colombes
- 2009–2013: Lorient

Senior career*
Years	Team	Apps	(Gls)
2010–2013	Lorient II	31	(0)
2012–2013	Lorient	14	(0)
2013–2015	Marseille II	4	(1)
2013–2015	Marseille	42	(2)
2015–2017	Juventus	29	(3)
2017–2021	Southampton	46	(2)
2019–2020	→ Galatasaray (loan)	20	(0)
2020–2021	→ Fulham (loan)	28	(1)
2021–2023	Nice	46	(2)
2023–2025	Wolverhampton Wanderers	71	(5)
2025–	Galatasaray	47	(4)

International career^{‡}
2013	France U20	6	(0)
2013	France U21	1	(0)
2015–	Gabon	42	(5)
Medal record
Representing France
Men's football
FIFA U-20 World Cup
Winner	2013 Turkey
- * Club domestic league appearances and goals as of 15:22, 7 November 2026 (UTC) ‡ National team caps and goals as of 23:18, 31 December 2025 (UTC)

Mario René Junior Lemina (French pronunciation: [maʁjo ləmina]; born 1 September 1993) is a Gabonese professional footballer who plays as a central midfielder for Süper Lig club Galatasaray and the Gabon national team.

Lemina played for French sides Lorient and Marseille, before joining Italian side Juventus in 2015, where he won the domestic double in both of his seasons with the club, as well as appearing in the 2017 UEFA Champions League final. He joined English side Southampton in 2017, and was later loaned out to Turkish club Galatasaray in 2019. After a loan to Fulham in England, he joined French club Nice in 2021. In January 2023, he returned to England after signing for Wolverhampton Wanderers.

A former French international at youth level, Lemina went on to represent Gabon at senior level, making his senior international debut in 2017. He later represented Gabon at the 2017, 2021 and 2025 Africa Cup of Nations.

== Club career ==
=== Early career ===
Lemina was born in Gabon to a Gabonese father and French mother. He began his youth career in France aged 7 at local club ES Nanterre; he then went to study sports at Rueil-Malmaison, finishing at Colombes. Aged 15, he signed with the Lorient youth academy; he was later promoted to the first team during the 2012–13 season, his only season with the club.

=== Marseille ===
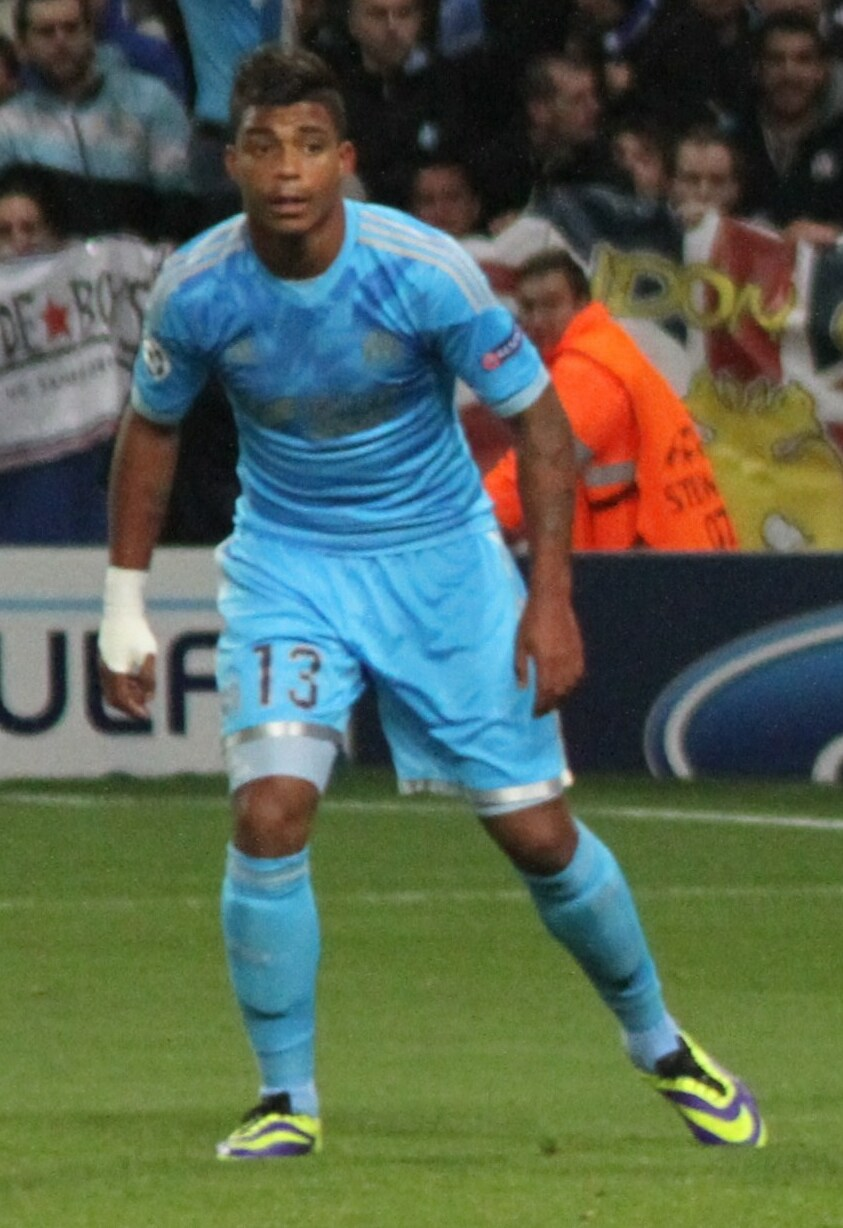
Lemina with Marseille in 2013

The following season, Marseille acquired Lemina for €4 million, although he initially struggled to gain playing time in his first year with the club, making only eight league starts during the 2013–14 season. He began to be used more frequently by manager Marcelo Bielsa during the 2014–15 season, making his breakthrough with the club, as he helped the team to a fourth-place finish, earning 23 appearances in the league. In February 2015, Lemina was sent off for a punch to the groin of Ola Toivonen in a 1–1 Ligue 1 away draw against Rennes.

=== Juventus ===
During the summer of 2015, Lemina began to attract the attention of several clubs, including Premier League clubs Liverpool, Southampton and West Ham United. On 31 August, however, the last day of the transfer window, Juventus announced the signing of Lemina on a season-long loan for €500,000 with an option to buy for €9.5 million at the end of the 2015–16 season. On 26 September 2015, he scored his first goal for Juventus in his third appearance, coming in the 63rd minute of a 2–1 away loss to Napoli.

On 29 April 2016, Lemina's loan was made permanent; he signed a four-year deal from Marseille for a fee of €9.5 million plus an extra €1 million if performance related targets are met. The deal was scheduled to keep him at Juventus until 2020. On 21 May, Lemina started in the Coppa Italia Final, playing the full match as Juventus defeated AC Milan 1–0 after extra time to capture the domestic double for the second consecutive season.

In his second season, he won the domestic double with the club, and appeared as a substitute in the Champions League final, where his team suffered a 4–1 defeat to Real Madrid.

=== Southampton ===
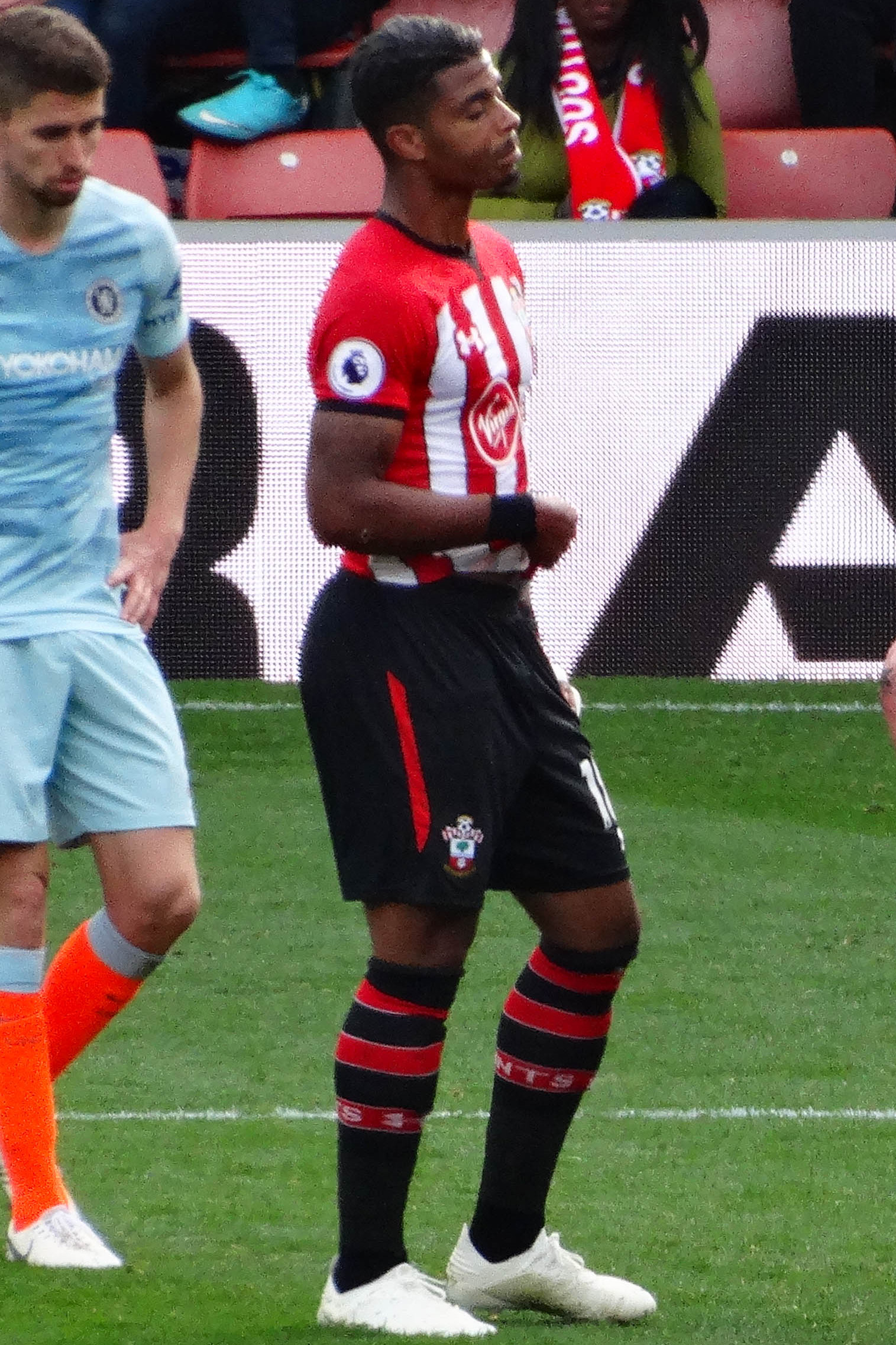
Lemina with Southampton in 2018

On 8 August 2017, Lemina joined Southampton on a five-year deal for a club record fee of £15.4m. He made his debut on 20 August, in a 3–2 victory over West Ham United. His first goal for Southampton came in a 3–2 victory over fellow strugglers West Bromwich Albion on 3 February.

==== Loan to Galatasaray ====
In 2019–20 season, Lemina joined Galatasaray on a loan deal.

==== Loan to Fulham ====
On 30 August 2020, Lemina was loaned out to Fulham with an option to buy. He made his debut for the club on 16 September 2020 in the second round of the EFL Cup against Ipswich Town, which Fulham won 1–0. On 7 March 2021, Lemina scored his first Fulham goal to seal a 1–0 away win over Liverpool, handing them their sixth consecutive league defeat at Anfield for the first time in the Reds' history. In doing so, Lemina also clinched Fulham's second win at Liverpool in the club's history.

=== Nice ===
On 24 July 2021, Lemina joined Nice for an undisclosed fee. Later that year, on 22 December, he scored his first goal for the club in a 2–1 win over Lens.

=== Wolverhampton Wanderers ===
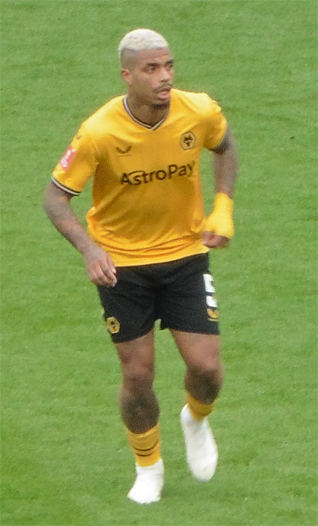
Lemina playing for Wolverhampton Wanderers (March 2024)

On 13 January 2023, Lemina joined Wolverhampton Wanderers for an undisclosed fee on a two-and-a-half-year deal. He made his first appearance on 14 January 2023 as a substitute in a home Premier League game against West Ham, a fixture which Wolves won 1–0.

Lemina made his full Wolves debut on 22 January 2023 in a 3–0 loss at Manchester City and then his full home debut on 4 February, helping the hosts to defeat Liverpool, also by a 3–0 scoreline.

On Lemina's fourth appearance for his new side on 11 February, he was sent off in the first-half of Wolves's Premier League game away to his former club, Southampton, for receiving two yellow cards. Wolves went on to win the game 2–1 despite playing for more than an hour with 10-men.

Lemina was sent off for the second time in his Wolves career in a 1–1 draw with Aston Villa at Molineux in the Premier League on 8 October 2023, having again picked up two yellow cards in one game. Upon his return from suspension, Lemina scored his first goal for Wolves in a 2–2 home draw with Newcastle United on 28 October 2023. He scored further goals in home wins against Tottenham Hotspur and Chelsea on 11 November and 24 December respectively, and then away to Brentford on 27 December.

Lemina scored his first-ever FA Cup goal, the only goal of the game, in a 1–0 Fifth Round home win against Brighton & Hove Albion on 28 February 2024.

Following Wolves's match against Crystal Palace on 11 May 2024, Lemina was named Supporters' Player of the Season.

Ahead of the 2024–25 season, Lemina was named club captain. However, Lemina was stripped of the captaincy on 13 December 2024, following an incident in the previous match against West Ham United. On 15 January 2025, it was revealed in a press conference by manager Vítor Pereira that Lemina wanted to leave the club.

=== Return to Galatasaray ===
On 5 February 2025, Lemina rejoined Turkish side Galatasaray for a transfer fee of €2.5 million. On 10 March 2026, he scored his first Champions League goal in a 1–0 win over Liverpool in the first leg of the round of 16.

On 21 July 2026, a new contract was signed between Galatasaray and Lemina, valid until the end of the 2027–28 season.

== International career ==
Lemina had been called by the Gabon national team to participate in the 2015 African Cup of Nations, but he refused his call-up. Although he had initially represented France's under-20 and under-21 sides, also winning the 2013 FIFA U-20 World Cup at youth level, he formally switched to the Gabonese Federation on 2 June 2015 and is now a formal member of the Gabon national team.

He scored on his international debut, in a 3–3 friendly draw against Tunisia on 9 October 2015. Lemina took part at the 2017 Africa Cup of Nations, which was held on home soil. He started in Gabon's opening match of the tournament on 14 January – a 1–1 draw against Guinea-Bissau – but later suffered a back-injury, however, which ruled him out of the remainder of the tournament.

On 17 January 2022, Lemina announced his retirement from the Gabon national team. He had just been released by Gabon following a heart complication due to COVID-19, leaving in the middle of the 2021 Africa Cup of Nations tournament.

On 10 June 2023, Lemina shared an image of him training with the national team to his Instagram account. He then played in a 2023 Africa Cup of Nations qualifier against DR Congo on 18 June 2023, confirming his return to the national team.

== Style of play ==
A right-footed midfielder with notable technical skills and distribution, Lemina is a box-to-box player who is usually deployed in the centre, due to his ability to start attacking plays after winning back possession. Described as a "classy and tenacious midfielder," due to his tactical versatility, he is capable of playing in several positions, and has been deployed as a winger, as a full-back, or as a wing-back, on the right flank; during his time with Marseille, he also played as centre-back in a three-man defence on occasion, during the 2014–15 season, under manager Marcelo Bielsa. He has also been deployed as a playmaker on occasion. Despite his talent, he has also earned a reputation for having a temper and for lacking concentration at times.

== Personal life ==
Lemina has a younger brother, Noha, who is also a professional footballer.

== Career statistics ==
=== Club ===
As of match played 7 November 2026

Appearances and goals by club, season and competition
Club	Season	League			National cup (Note: Includes Coupe de France, Coppa Italia, FA Cup, Turkish Cup)		League cup (Note: Includes Coupe de la Ligue, EFL Cup)		Europe		Other		Total	
Club	Season	Division	Apps	Goals	Apps	Goals	Apps	Goals	Apps	Goals	Apps	Goals	Apps	Goals
Lorient II	2010–11	CFA	5	0	—		—		—		—		5	0
Lorient II	2011–12	CFA	15	0	—		—		—		—		15	0
Lorient II	2012–13	CFA	11	0	—		—		—		—		11	0
Lorient II	Total		31	0	—		—		—		—		31	0
Lorient	2012–13	Ligue 1	10	0	4	0	—		—		—		14	0
Lorient	2013–14	Ligue 1	4	0	—		—		—		—		4	0
Lorient	Total		14	0	4	0	—		—		—		18	0
Marseille II	2013–14	CFA 2	3	0	—		—		—		—		3	0
Marseille II	2014–15	CFA 2	1	1	—		—		—		—		1	1
Marseille II	Total		4	1	—		—		—		—		4	1
Marseille	2013–14	Ligue 1	15	0	1	0	2	0	4 (Note: Appearances in UEFA Champions League)	0	—		22	0
Marseille	2014–15	Ligue 1	23	2	1	0	1	0	—		—		25	2
Marseille	2015–16	Ligue 1	4	0	—		—		—		—		4	0
Marseille	Total		42	2	2	0	3	0	4	0	—		51	2
Juventus	2015–16	Serie A	10	2	2	0	—		3	0	—		15	2
Juventus	2016–17	Serie A	19	1	2	0	—		7	0	1 (Note: Appearance in Supercoppa Italiana)	0	29	1
Juventus	Total		29	3	4	0	—		10	0	1	0	44	3
Southampton	2017–18	Premier League	25	1	4	0	0	0	—		—		29	1
Southampton	2018–19	Premier League	21	1	0	0	2	0	—		—		23	1
Southampton	Total		46	2	4	0	2	0	—		—		52	2
Galatasaray (loan)	2019–20	Süper Lig	20	0	4	1	—		4	0	—		28	1
Fulham (loan)	2020–21	Premier League	28	1	1	0	1	0	—		—		30	1
Nice	2021–22	Ligue 1	32	2	4	0	—		—		—		36	2
Nice	2022–23	Ligue 1	14	0	1	0	—		7 (Note: Appearances in UEFA Europa Conference League)	1	—		22	1
Nice	Total		46	2	5	0	—		7	1	—		58	3
Wolverhampton Wanderers	2022–23	Premier League	19	0	0	0	—		—		—		19	0
Wolverhampton Wanderers	2023–24	Premier League	35	4	4	1	0	0	—		—		39	5
Wolverhampton Wanderers	2024–25	Premier League	17	1	0	0	2	0	—		—		19	1
Wolverhampton Wanderers	Total		71	5	4	1	2	0	—		—		77	6
Galatasaray	2024–25	Süper Lig	12	1	4	0	—		0	0	—		16	1
Galatasaray	2025–26	Süper Lig	27	2	3	0	—		9	1	2 (Note: Appearances in Turkish Super Cup)	0	41	3
Galatasaray	2026–27	Süper Lig	8	1	0	0	—		3	0	0	0	11	1
Galatasaray	Total		47	4	7	0	—		12	1	2	0	68	5
Career total			378	20	35	2	8	0	37	2	3	0	461	24

=== International ===
As of match played 31 December 2025

Appearances and goals by national team and year
National team	Year	Apps	Goals
Gabon	2015	3	1
Gabon	2016	5	1
Gabon	2017	4	1
Gabon	2018	4	0
Gabon	2019	2	0
Gabon	2020	0	0
Gabon	2021	5	0
Gabon	2022	1	0
Gabon	2023	3	0
Gabon	2024	7	0
Gabon	2025	8	2
Total		42	5

Scores and results list Gabon's goal tally first, score column indicates score after each Lemina goal.

List of international goals scored by Mario Lemina
No.	Date	Venue	Opponent	Score	Result	Competition
1	9 October 2015	Stade Olympique de Radès, Radès, Tunisia	Tunisia	2–3	3–3	Friendly
2	15 November 2016	Stade El Menzah, Tunis, Tunisia	Comoros	1–1	1–1	Friendly
3	5 September 2017	Stade Bouaké, Bouaké, Ivory Coast	Ivory Coast	2–0	2–1	2018 FIFA World Cup qualification
4	14 October 2025	Stade de Franceville, Franceville, Burundi	Burundi	2–0	2–0	2026 FIFA World Cup qualification
5	13 November 2025	Moulay Hassan Stadium, Rabat, Morocco	Nigeria	1–1	1–4 (a.e.t.)	2026 FIFA World Cup qualification

== Honours ==
Juventus

- Serie A: 2015–16, 2016–17
- Coppa Italia: 2015–16, 2016–17
- UEFA Champions League runner-up: 2016–17

Nice

- Coupe de France runner-up: 2021–22

Galatasaray

- Süper Lig: 2024–25, 2025–26
- Turkish Cup: 2024–25

France U20

- FIFA U-20 World Cup: 2013
