= Kapit Djoco =

French footballer (born 1995)

Personal information
- Full name: Kapitbafan Djoco
- Date of birth: 9 September 1995 (age 31)
- Place of birth: Paris, France
- Height: 1.86 m (6 ft 1 in)
- Position: Forward

Team information
- Current team: Sochaux
- Number: 9

Youth career
- 2012–2014: Les Lilas

Senior career*
Years	Team	Apps	(Gls)
2014–2016	Avranches	12	(0)
2016–2017	Poissy	0	(0)
2017–2019	Aubervilliers	45	(19)
2019–2020	C'Chartres	20	(7)
2020–2021	Rouen	8	(0)
2021–2022	Versailles	35	(13)
2022–2024	Bastia	37	(4)
2024–2025	Annecy	50	(9)
2025–	Sochaux	32	(11)
- * Club domestic league appearances and goals as of 23 June 2026

Kapitbafan Djoco (born 9 September 1995) is a French professional footballer who plays as a forward for Ligue 2 club Sochaux.

== Career ==
In 2022, Djoco reached the semi-final of the Coupe de France with Versailles. He signed his first professional contract with Bastia in December 2022, making his full professional debut against Caen a few days later.

In January 2024, Djoco joined Annecy.

On 15 July 2025, Djoco moved to Sochaux on a two-season deal.

== Personal life ==
Djoco is French-Senegalese.
