= Trévis Dago =

French footballer (born 2005)

Personal information
- Date of birth: 25 January 2005 (age 21)
- Place of birth: Villeneuve-Saint-Georges, France
- Height: 1.83 m (6 ft 0 in)
- Position: Forward

Team information
- Current team: Laval
- Number: 11

Youth career
- Valenton Football Academy
- Créteil
- –2023: Auxerre

Senior career*
Years	Team	Apps	(Gls)
2023–2025	Lille B	20	(4)
2024–2025	Lille	4	(0)
2024–2025	→ Annecy (loan)	23	(4)
2025–	Laval	6	(0)
- * Club domestic league appearances and goals as of 12 May 2026

Trévis Dago (born 25 January 2005) is a French footballer who plays as a forward for Ligue 2 club Laval.

== Career ==
As a youth player, Dago joined the Valenton Football Academy. Following his stint there, he joined the youth academy of Créteil, before joining the youth academy of Auxerre. In 2023, he signed for French Ligue 1 side Lille, playing for the club's reserve team at the start of the season.

By the second half of the season, he was promoted to their first team. On 25 February 2024, he debuted for them during a 1–3 away loss to Toulouse in the league. During the summer of 2024, he was sent on loan to Annecy. On 27 September 2024, he scored his first goal for the club during a 2–2 away draw with Bastia in the league.

On 31 December 2025, Dago agreed to join Ligue 2 club Laval on a three-and-a-half year contract from 1 January 2026.

== Personal life ==
Born in France, Dago is of Ivorian descent and holds dual-citizenship.

== Style of play ==
Dago can operate as a forward or as a winger and is right-footed. Portuguese manager Paulo Fonseca said that he "like[d] the aggressiveness of Trévis" while managing Lille.
