= 2022–23 Le Havre AC season =

Le Havre AC
2022–23 season
- President: Vincent Volpe
- Head coach: Luka Elsner
- Stadium: Stade Océane
- Ligue 2: 1st (promoted)
- Coupe de France: Seventh round
- Top goalscorer: League: Nabil Alioui; Quentin Cornette; Victor Lekhal (6 each); All: Nabil Alioui; Quentin Cornette; Victor Lekhal (6 each)

The 2022–23 season was the 151st in the history of Le Havre AC and their 14th consecutive season in the second division. The club participated in Ligue 2 and the Coupe de France.

== Players ==
As of 23 January 2023

No.	Pos.	Nation	Player
1	GK	FRA	Mathieu Gorgelin
2	DF	MAR	Abdelwahed Wahib
4	DF	FRA	Gautier Lloris
5	MF	MAR	Oussama Targhalline
6	MF	FRA	Check Oumar Diakité (on loan from Paris FC)
7	FW	FRA	Amadou Samoura
8	MF	MAR	Yassine Kechta
9	FW	COD	Yann Kitala
10	FW	FRA	Nabil Alioui
11	FW	FRA	Quentin Cornette
13	FW	FRA	Steve Ngoura
14	FW	SEN	Jamal Thiaré
15	DF	NED	Terence Kongolo (on loan from Fulham)
16	GK	CIV	Mohamed Koné
17	DF	MAR	Oualid El Hajjam
18	DF	CGO	Nolan Mbemba

No.	Pos.	Nation	Player
19	DF	FRA	Djamal Moussadek
20	FW	FRA	Élysée Logbo
21	FW	FRA	Ylan Gomes
22	MF	ALG	Victor Lekhal
23	FW	FRA	Josué Casimir
24	MF	MAR	Amir Richardson (on loan from Reims)
25	MF	FRA	Alois Confais
26	MF	FRA	Simon Ebonog
27	DF	CIV	Christopher Opéri
28	FW	FRA	Elies Mahmoud
29	FW	FRA	Samuel Grandsir
30	GK	FRA	Arthur Desmas
33	MF	FRA	Antoine Joujou
35	DF	FRA	Yoni Gomis
66	MF	CMR	Aristide Wam
92	DF	FRA	Étienne Youte Kinkoue
93	DF	SEN	Arouna Sangante

=== Out on loan ===
Note: Flags indicate national team as defined under FIFA eligibility rules; some limited exceptions apply. Players may hold more than one non-FIFA nationality.

No.	Pos.	Nation	Player
—	FW	MTN	Pape Ibnou Bâ (on loan to Pau)

== Pre-season and friendlies ==
Win Draw Loss Fixtures

9 July 2022 Friendly	Le Havre	2–1	Quevilly-Rouen	Le Havre
17:30 CEST (UTC+2)	Thiaré 18' (pen.); Lekhal 77'		Hountondji 6'	Stadium: Stade Charles Argentin

13 July 2022 Friendly	Avranches	2–2	Le Havre	Deauville
17:30 CEST (UTC+2)	Lamrabette 43'; Mbuyi 84'		Thiaré 9'; Cornette 17'	Stadium: Stade du Commandant-Hébert; Referee: Gaëtan Deneuve

16 July 2022 Friendly	Amiens	4–1	Le Havre	Amiens
17:30 CEST (UTC+2)	Badji 7', 20'; Arokodare 15'; Chibozo 84'		Mahmoud 65'	Stadium: Annexe 2 Licorne; Referee: Anthony Ustaritz

20 July 2022 Friendly	Troyes	3–0	Le Havre	Poissy
17:30 CEST (UTC+2)	Salmier 29'; Ilić 70' (pen.); Lefebvre 88'			Stadium: Stade Léo-Lagrange

22 July 2022 Friendly	Dijon	1–0	Le Havre	Clairefontaine-en-Yvelines
18:00 CEST (UTC+2)	Le Bihan 44'

8 December 2022 Friendly	Hassania Agadir	0–1	Le Havre	Agadir, Morocco
19:30 CET (UTC+1)			Cornette 29'	Stadium: Stade Adrar

13 December 2022 Friendly	Le Havre	1–2	Guingamp	Avranches
14:30 CET (UTC+1)				Stadium: Stade René Fenouillère

17 December 2022 Friendly	Lens	3–0	Le Havre	Lens
13:00 CET (UTC+1)	Machado 10', 24'; Openda (penalty missed) 89'; Sotoca 90'			Stadium: Stade Bollaert-Delelis

17 December 2022 Friendly	Lens	0–0	Le Havre	Lens
15:30 CET (UTC+1)				Stadium: Stade Bollaert-Delelis
Note: Match was played in two 35-minute halves.

== Competitions ==
=== Overall record ===
Competition	First match	Last match	Starting round	Final position	Record							
Competition	First match	Last match	Starting round	Final position	Pld	W	D	L	GF	GA	GD	Win %
Ligue 2	30 July 2022	2 June 2023	Matchday 1	Winners	38	20	15	3	46	19	+27	52.63
Coupe de France	29 October 2022		Seventh round	Seventh round	1	0	1	0	3	3	+0	0.00
Total					39	20	16	3	49	22	+27	51.28

Source: Soccerway

=== Ligue 2 ===
==== League table ====
Pos	Team	Pld	W	D	L	GF	GA	GD	Pts	Promotion or Relegation
1	Le Havre (C, P)	38	20	15	3	46	19	+27	75	Promotion to Ligue 1
2	Metz (P)	38	20	12	6	61	33	+28	72	Promotion to Ligue 1
3	Bordeaux	38	20	9	9	51	28	+23	69	
4	Bastia	38	17	9	12	52	45	+7	60	
5	Caen	38	16	11	11	52	43	+9	59	

Source: Ligue 2
Rules for classification: 1) Points; 2) Goal difference; 3) Number of goals scored; 4) Head-to-head goal difference; 5) Fair play points
(C) Champions; (P) Promoted

==== Results summary ====
Overall								Home						Away					
Pld	W	D	L	GF	GA	GD	Pts	W	D	L	GF	GA	GD	W	D	L	GF	GA	GD
38	20	15	3	46	19	+27	75	11	7	1	23	9	+14	9	8	2	23	10	+13

Source: Ligue 2

==== Results by round ====
Round	1	2	3	4	5	6	7	8	9	10	11	12	13	14	15	16	17	18	19	20	21	22
Ground	H	A	H	A	H	A	H	A	H	A	H	A	H	A	A	H	A	H	H	A	A	H
Result	D	L	D	W	D	W	W	W	W	D	W	D	W	W	W	W	D	W	W	D	W	
Position	7	15	15	10	10	8	4	2	2	4	3	2	2	1	1	1	1	1	1	1	1	

Updated to match(es) played on 31 January 2023. Source: Ligue 2
A = Away; H = Home; W = Win; D = Draw; L = Loss

==== Matches ====
The league fixtures were announced on 17 June 2022.

30 July 2022 1	Le Havre	0–0	Grenoble	Le Havre
19:00 CEST (UTC+2)		Report		Stadium: Stade Océane; Attendance: 5,388; Referee: Pierre Legat

6 August 2022 2	Valenciennes	1–0	Le Havre	Valenciennes
19:00 CEST (UTC+2)	Hamache 13'	Report		Stadium: Stade du Hainaut; Attendance: 4,657; Referee: Alexandre Perreau Niel

13 August 2022 3	Le Havre	1–1	Pau	Le Havre
19:00 CEST (UTC+2)	Kechta 21'	Report	Beusnard 82'	Stadium: Stade Océane; Attendance: 4,612; Referee: Azzedine Souifi

20 August 2022 4	Saint-Étienne	0–6	Le Havre	Saint-Étienne
15:00 CEST (UTC+2)		Report	Sangante 51'; Alioui 56'; Lekhal 64'; Operi 80', 84'; Kitala 89'	Stadium: Stade Geoffroy-Guichard; Referee: François Letexier

27 August 2022 5	Le Havre	1–1	Amiens	Le Havre
19:00 CEST (UTC+2)	Thiaré 72'	Report	Arokodare 13'	Stadium: Stade Océane; Attendance: 5,431; Referee: Antoine Valnet

30 August 2022 6	Laval	1–3	Le Havre	Laval
20:45 CEST (UTC+2)	Diaw 32'	Report	Kitala 49'; Thiaré 71'; Richardson 78'	Stadium: Stade Francis Le Basser; Attendance: 8,201; Referee: Aurélien Petit

2 September 2022 7	Le Havre	2–1	Caen	Le Havre
20:45 CEST (UTC+2)	Lekhal 7' (pen.); Thiaré 76'	Report	Kyeremeh 90+1'	Stadium: Stade Océane; Attendance: 16,007; Referee: Abdelatif Kherradji

10 September 2022 8	Niort	0–1	Le Havre	Niort
19:00 CEST (UTC+2)	Vallier (yellow card) 31'; Passi (yellow card) 53'; Kilama (yellow card) 90+2'	Report	Lekhal 54' (pen.); Richardson (yellow card) 79'; Mahmoud (yellow card) 90'; Confais (yellow card) 90+3'	Stadium: Stade René Gaillard; Attendance: 2,000; Referee: (France) Alexandre Perreau Niel

17 September 2022 9	Le Havre	2–0	Annecy	Le Havre
19:00 CEST (UTC+2)	Kechta (yellow card) 49'; Casimir (yellow card) 67'; Alioui 75' (pen.); Cornette 83'	Report	Bastian (yellow card) 42' (yellow-red card) 63'; Mouanga (yellow card) 51'; Pajot (yellow card) 70'; Baldé (yellow card) 86'	Stadium: Stade Océane; Attendance: 5,965; Referee: (France) Guillaume Paradis

1 October 2022 10	Dijon	0–0	Le Havre	Dijon
19:00 CEST (UTC+2)	Fofana (yellow card) 1'; Rocchia (yellow card) 41'; Tchaouna (yellow card) 71'; Thioune (yellow card) 85'	Report	Kitala (yellow card) 6'; Casimir (yellow card) 8'; Mbemba (yellow card) 19'	Stadium: Stade Gaston Gérard; Attendance: 6,533; Referee: (France) Romain Lissorgue

8 October 2022 11	Le Havre	3–0	Bastia	Le Havre
19:00 CEST (UTC+2)	Lloris 23'; Cornette 33'; Lekhal (yellow card) 45' (goal) 48'; Kitala (yellow card) 67'; Diallo (yellow card) 89'	Report	Robic (yellow card) 45'; Ducrocq (yellow card) 54'; Mamadou Camara (yellow card) 72'	Stadium: Stade Océane; Attendance: 6,398; Referee: (France) Remi Landry

15 October 2022 12	Rodez	1–1	Le Havre	Rodez
19:00 CEST (UTC+2)	Ouammou (yellow card) 22'; Boissier (yellow card) 54'; Depres (yellow card) 64'; Joseph Mendes 74'; Danger (yellow card) 76'	Report	Kechta (yellow card) 36'; Danger 45' (o.g.); Thiaré (yellow card) 66'; Opéri (yellow card) 83'; Sangante (yellow card) 90+5'	Stadium: Stade Paul-Lignon; Attendance: 1,538; Referee: (France) Pierre Legat

24 October 2022 13	Le Havre	2–0	Metz	Le Havre
20:45 CET (UTC+1)	Lloris 10'; Richardson (yellow card) 35'; Alioui 53'; Kechta (yellow card) 63'	Report	Fali Candé (yellow card) 40'; Jean Jacques (yellow card) 56'	Stadium: Stade Océane; Attendance: 11,832; Referee: Gaël Angoula

5 November 2022 14	Quevilly-Rouen	0–1	Le Havre	Le Petit-Quevilly
19:00 CET (UTC+1)	Ben Youssef (yellow card) 45+2'; Pierret (yellow card) 58'	Report	El Hajjam (yellow card) 7'; Alioui (yellow card) 38' (goal) 55'; Casimir (yellow card) 41'; Richardson (yellow card) 64'; Gomes (yellow card) 88'; Salifou Soumah (yellow card) 90+6'	Stadium: Stade Robert Diochon; Attendance: 7,963; Referee: (France) Alexandre Perreau Niel

12 November 2022 15	Guingamp	0–1	Le Havre	Guingamp
19:00 CET (UTC+1)	Livolant (yellow card) 3'; Louiserre (yellow card) 59'; Gaudin (yellow card) 82'	Report	Alioui 87'; El Hajjam (yellow card) 90+3'	Stadium: Stade de Roudourou; Attendance: 10,251; Referee: (France) Azzedine Souifi

26 December 2022 16	Le Havre	1–0	Bordeaux	Le Havre
19:00 CET (UTC+1)	Richardson 9'; Cornette (yellow card) 14' (yellow-red card) 67'; Sangante (yellow card) 45'; Thiaré (yellow card) 69'	Report	Gregersen (yellow card) 38'; Ihnatenko (yellow card) 77'	Stadium: Stade Océane; Attendance: 23,005; Referee: (France) Guillaume Paradis

30 December 2022 17	Paris FC	0–0	Le Havre	Paris
21:00 CET (UTC+1)		Report	Alioui (yellow card) 90+1'	Stadium: Stade Sébastien Charléty; Attendance: 4,608; Referee: (France) Olivier Thual

10 January 2023 18	Le Havre	1–0	Sochaux	Le Havre
20:45 CET (UTC+1)	Sangante (yellow card) 67'; Alvero 76' (o.g.)	Report	Agouzoul (yellow card) 13'; Alvero (yellow card) 49'; Doumbia (yellow card) 82'; Aaneba (yellow card) 88'; Kanouté (yellow card) 90+2'	Stadium: Stade Océane; Attendance: 12,026; Referee: Aurélien Petit

13 January 2023 19	Le Havre	3–1	Nîmes	Le Havre
20:45 CET (UTC+1)	Diakité (yellow card) 49'; Cornette 61', 84', 90+2'; Casimir (yellow card) 70'	Report	Fomba 50', (yellow card) 58'; Benrahou (yellow card) 70'; Saïd (yellow card) 85'	Stadium: Stade Océane; Attendance: 8,562; Referee: Benjamin Lepaysant

28 January 2023 20	Amiens	1–1	Le Havre	Amiens
19:00 CET (UTC+1)	Lekhal 10' (o.g.); Gomis (yellow card) 27'	Report	Thiaré 88'	Stadium: Stade de la Licorne; Attendance: 7,960; Referee: Romain Lissorgue

31 January 2023 21	Bordeaux	1–2	Le Havre	Bordeaux
20:45 CET (UTC+1)	Lacoux (yellow card) 36'; Barbet (yellow card) 38'; N'Simba 55'; Badji (yellow card) 84'	Report	Casimir 15'; Opéri (yellow card) 54'; El Hajjam 77'; Sangante (yellow card) 84'; Mahmoud (yellow card) 90+2'	Stadium: Matmut Atlantique; Attendance: 20,569; Referee: Mikael Lesage

3 February 2023 22	Le Havre	0–0	Paris FC	Le Havre
20:45 CET (UTC+1)	Opéri (yellow card) 86'	Report	Maçon (yellow card) 47'	Stadium: Stade Océane; Attendance: 12,372; Referee: Gaël Angoula

11 February 2023 23	Sochaux	1–1	Le Havre	Montbéliard
19:00 CET (UTC+1)	Henry (yellow card) 10'; Kalulu 87'; Weissbeck (yellow card) 90+14'	Report	Sangante 4'; Lekhal (yellow card) 34'; Desmas (yellow card) 75'; Mahmoud (yellow card) 90+10'	Stadium: Stade Auguste Bonal; Attendance: 15,203; Referee: Abdelatif Kherradji

18 February 2023 24	Le Havre	1–0	Niort	Le Havre
19:00 CET (UTC+1)	Grandsir (yellow card) 71'; Kongolo (yellow card) 73'; Cornette 87'	Report	Olaitan (yellow card) 90+4'	Stadium: Stade Océane; Attendance: 9,064; Referee: Azzédine Souifi

25 February 2023 25	Grenoble	0–0	Le Havre	Grenoble
19:00 CET (UTC+1)	Bénet (yellow card) 5'; M. Diarra (yellow card) 57'	Report	Targhalline (yellow card) 40'; Richardson (yellow card) 63'; Thiaré (yellow card) 71'; Lekhal (penalty missed) 86'	Stadium: Stade des Alpes; Attendance: 7,034; Referee: Antoine Valnet

4 March 2023 26	Le Havre	2–1	Laval	Le Havre
19:00 CET (UTC+1)	Joujou 16'; Sangante (yellow card) 32', (goal) 79'; Grandsir (yellow card) 40'; Thiaré (yellow card) 72'	Report	A. Gonçalves (yellow card) 8'; Adéoti 10', (yellow card) 28'; Bobichon (yellow card) 66'	Stadium: Stade Océane; Attendance: 8,074; Referee: Faouzi Benchabane

13 March 2023 27	Metz	1–1	Le Havre	Metz
20:45 CET (UTC+1)	Maziz 20'	Report	Sangante (yellow card) 12'; El Hajjam (yellow card) 15'; Lekhal (yellow card) 16'; Kongolo (yellow card) 28'; Richardson 46'; Mbemba (yellow card) 87'	Stadium: Stade Saint-Symphorien; Attendance: 15,3995; Referee: Olivier Thual

18 March 2023 28	Le Havre	2–2	Saint-Étienne	Le Havre
15:00 CET (UTC+1)	Cornette (yellow card) 47'; Alioui 58'; Lekhal (penalty scored) 66'; Thiaré (yellow card) 71'; Sangante (yellow card) 82'	Report	Lobry (yellow card) 32'; Briançon (yellow card) 61'; Bamba 68'; Pétrot (red card) 79'; Krasso 85'	Stadium: Stade Océane; Attendance: 23,264; Referee: Guillaume Paradis

1 April 2023 29	Pau	0–1	Le Havre	Pau
19:00 CEST (UTC+2)	Kouassi (yellow card) 83'	Report	Grandsir 39'; Cornette (yellow card) 83'; Opéri (yellow card) 83'; Targhalline (yellow card) 90+1'	Stadium: Nouste Camp; Attendance: 3,009; Referee: Benjamin Lepaysant

8 April 2023 30	Le Havre	0–0	Guingamp	Le Havre
19:00 CEST (UTC+2)	Sangante (yellow card) 11'; Thiaré (yellow card) 69'; Targhalline (yellow card) 78'	Report	Sivis (yellow card) 4'	Stadium: Stade Océane; Attendance: 10,881; Referee: Pierre Legat

15 April 2023 31	Nîmes	0–1	Le Havre	Nîmes
19:00 CET (UTC+1)	Pagis (yellow card) 22'; Poulain (yellow card) 45+3'	Report	Lekhal 45+4' (pen.)	Stadium: Stade des Antonins; Attendance: 1,963; Referee: Ruddy Buquet

22 April 2023 32	Le Havre	0–0	Quevilly-Rouen	Le Havre
19:00 CEST (UTC+2)	Opéri (yellow card) 75'	Report	Sidibé (yellow card) 56'	Stadium: Stade Océane; Attendance: 16,594; Referee: Aurélien Petit

29 April 2023 33	Caen	1–2	Le Havre	Caen
14:45 CEST (UTC+2)	Ntim 89'	Report	Lloris 42'; Casimir (yellow card) 52'; Targhalline 56'; Richardson (red card) 90+5'	Stadium: Stade Michel d'Ornano; Attendance: 19,686; Referee: Romain Lissorgue

8 May 2023 34	Le Havre	1–0	Rodez	Le Havre
19:00 CEST (UTC+2)	Lekhal (penalty missed) 32'; Valério 88' (o.g.)	Report	Abdallah (yellow card) 40'	Stadium: Stade Océane; Attendance: 14,688; Referee: Gaël Angoula

15 May 2023 35	Annecy	1–0	Le Havre	Annecy
19:00 CEST (UTC+2)	Rocchi (yellow card) 39'; Mouanga 50'; Lajugie (yellow card) 55'; Demoncy (yellow card) 90+3'	Report	Targhalline (yellow card) 48'; Cornette (yellow card) 82'; Lekhal (yellow card) 85'; Thiaré (yellow card) 90', (red card) 90'; Sangante (yellow card) 90'; Opéri (yellow card) 90+1'	Stadium: Parc des Sports; Attendance: 8,063; Referee: Olivier Thual

22 May 2023 36	Le Havre	0–2	Valenciennes	Le Havre
19:00 CEST (UTC+2)	Desmas (yellow card) 5'; Lloris (yellow card) 45'	Report	Grbić (penalty scored) 7'; Poha (yellow card) 42'; Kaba 45+2'; Lecoeuche (yellow card) 79'	Stadium: Stade Océane; Attendance: 19,799; Referee: Karim Abed

26 May 2023 37	Bastia	1–1	Le Havre	Furiani
20:45 CEST (UTC+2)	Guidi (yellow card) 40', (goal) 53'; Santelli (yellow card) 60'; Djoco (yellow card) 69'; Ducrocq (yellow card) 90+5'	Report	Casimir (yellow card) 45+1'; El Hajjam (yellow card) 52'; Logbo (yellow card) 64'; Opéri (yellow card) 69'; Grandsir 88'; Lloris (yellow card) 90+7'	Stadium: Stade Armand-Cesari; Attendance: 12,529; Referee: Guillaume Paradis

2 June 2023 38	Le Havre	1–0	Dijon	Le Havre
19:00 CEST (UTC+2)	Casimir 11'; Opéri (yellow card) 33'; Sangante (yellow card) 40'; Targhalline (yellow card) 60'	Report	Thioune (yellow card) 42'	Stadium: Stade Océane; Attendance: 23,561; Referee: Romain Lissorgue

=== Coupe de France ===
29 October 2022 7th Round	Alençon	3–3 (5–3 p)	Le Havre	Alençon
18:00 CET	Amaury Tessier 13' (yellow card) 40' (goal) 42'; Karim El Hamdaoui (yellow card) 5'; Joachim Lepage (yellow card) 42'; Jocelyn Sancho (yellow card) 58'; Hakim El Hamdaoui 62'	Report	Mahmoud 22' (yellow card) 90+2'; Gomes 43'; Kongolo (yellow card) 88'; Salifou Soumah 90+5'	Stadium: Stade Jacques Fould; Attendance: 2,232; Referee: (France) Ludovic Genest
