= Simon Ebonog =

Cameroonian footballer (born 2004)

Personal information
- Date of birth: 16 August 2004 (age 22)
- Place of birth: Yaoundé, Cameroon
- Height: 1.80 m (5 ft 11 in)
- Position: Midfielder

Team information
- Current team: Le Havre
- Number: 26

Youth career
- 2009–2014: Paris Saint-Germain
- 2014–2016: INF Clairefontaine
- 2016–2022: Le Havre

Senior career*
Years	Team	Apps	(Gls)
2021–	Le Havre B	35	(3)
2022–	Le Havre	42	(1)
2024–2025	→ Nancy (loan)	16	(1)
- * Club domestic league appearances and goals as of 18 October 2026

Simon Ebonog (born 16 August 2004) is a Cameroonian professional footballer who plays as a midfielder for Ligue 1 club Le Havre.

== Career ==
Born in Yaoundé, the capital of Cameroon, Simon Ebonog arrived in France not long after his birth, starting to play football at Paris Saint-Germain as an under-7. After spending five years in the academy, he went through the INF Clairefontaine before joining Le Havre academy in 2016.

He played with the under-19s during the 2021–22 season, during which he was part of the team that beat Paris Saint-Germain in the Coupe Gambardella.

Ebonog signed his first professional contract with the club on the summer 2022. He was then part of a very youthful first team squad under Luka Elsner—including the likes of Steve Ngoura, Élysée Logbo, Yoni Gomis and Antoine Joujou—, that would eventually play for the top Ligue 2 spot.

Ebonog made his professional debut for Le Havre on the 29 April 2023, replacing Oussama Targhalline in a 2–1 away Ligue 2 win to Caen, the first time the Norman conceded a home loss in 12 matches.

== Career statistics ==
As of match played 18 October 2026

Appearances and goals by club, season and competition
Club	Season	League			Cup		Other		Total	
Club	Season	Division	Apps	Goals	Apps	Goals	Apps	Goals	Apps	Goals
Le Havre B	2021–22	CFA 2	6	1	—		—		6	1
Le Havre B	2022–23	CFA 2	13	1	—		—		13	1
Le Havre B	2023–24	CFA 2	16	1	—		—		16	1
Le Havre B	Total		35	3	—		—		35	3
Le Havre	2022–23	Ligue 2	1	0	—		—		1	0
Le Havre	2023–24	Ligue 1	4	0	—		—		4	0
Le Havre	2025–26	Ligue 1	30	1	1	0	—		31	1
Le Havre	2026–27	Ligue 1	6	0	0	0	—		6	0
Le Havre	Total		41	1	1	0	—		42	1
Nancy (loan)	2024–25	Ligue 3	16	1	2	0	—		18	1
Career total			92	5	3	0	0	0	95	5

== Honours ==
Nancy

- Ligue 3: 2024–25
