= Élysée Logbo =

French footballer (born 2004)

Personal information
- Full name: Andy Élysée Logbo
- Date of birth: 6 May 2004 (age 22)
- Place of birth: Paris 10e, France
- Height: 1.88 m (6 ft 2 in)
- Position: Forward

Team information
- Current team: Le Havre

Youth career
- –2017: CFFP
- 2017–2022: Le Havre

Senior career*
| Years | Team | Apps | (Gls) |
| 2021– | Le Havre B | 11 | (1) |
| 2022– | Le Havre | 13 | (0) |
| 2026 | → Bourg-Péronnas (loan) | 12 | (1) |
- * Club domestic league appearances and goals as of 23 June 2026

Andy Élysée Logbo (born 6 May 2004) is a French professional footballer who plays as a forward for Ligue 1 club Le Havre.

== Club career ==
Born in Paris, Andy Élysée Logbo joined the Le Havre AC academy in 2017 from CFFP.

He became a regular goalscorer with the under-19s by the 2021–22 season, most notably playing a key role in his team's beating of Paris Saint-Germain in the Coupe Gambardella, whilst also making his debut with the reserve team, in September 2021, during a 0–0 National 3 draw against Cherbourg.

He signed his first professional contract with the club on the summer 2022, after he had been announced as a potential Liverpool signing, having previously visited their training facilities. He was then part of a very youthful first team squad under Luka Elsner, including the likes of Steve Ngoura, Simon Ebonog, Yoni Gomis and Antoine Joujou, that would eventually play for the top Ligue 2 spot.

Despite facing injury issues during the 2022-23 season, he kept on playing for the reserve, scoring his first goal for the team in February 2023, opening the score during a 3–0 win against the club that saw him make his debut the previous season.

Logbo made his professional debut for Le Havre on the 22 May 2023, coming on as a substitute for Quentin Cornette in the last 20 minutes of a 2–0 home loss to Valenciennes, as his club was still trying to consolidate its status as league leader.

On 14 January 2026, Logbo was loaned by Bourg-Péronnas in Championnat National.

== International career ==
Logbo is eligible for both French and Ivorian national teams.

== Style of play ==
Logbo is described as a physically strong centre-forward, good at winning and protecting the ball, creating many goal chances and also showing abilities to attack the debt of the field.

His profile earned him early comparison to Romelu Lukaku, as a youth player.

== Career statistics ==
As of match played 5 January 2025

Appearances and goals by club, season and competition
| Club | Season | League | | | Cup | | Europe | | Other | | Total | |
| Club | Season | Division | Apps | Goals | Apps | Goals | Apps | Goals | Apps | Goals | Apps | Goals |
|---|---|---|---|---|---|---|---|---|---|---|---|---|
| Le Havre II | 2021–22 | Championnat National 3 | 4 | 0 | — | | — | | — | | 4 | 0 |
| Le Havre II | 2022–23 | Championnat National 3 | 4 | 1 | — | | — | | — | | 4 | 1 |
| Le Havre II | 2023–24 | Championnat National 3 | 3 | 0 | — | | — | | — | | 3 | 0 |
| Le Havre II | Total | | 11 | 1 | — | | — | | — | | 11 | 1 |
| Le Havre | 2022–23 | Ligue 2 | 2 | 0 | 0 | 0 | — | | — | | 2 | 0 |
| Le Havre | 2023–24 | Ligue 1 | 10 | 0 | 0 | 0 | — | | — | | 10 | 1 |
| Le Havre | 2024–25 | Ligue 1 | 1 | 0 | 1 | 0 | — | | — | | 2 | 0 |
| Le Havre | Total | | 13 | 0 | 1 | 0 | — | | — | | 14 | 1 |
| Career total | | | 24 | 1 | 1 | 0 | 0 | 0 | 0 | 0 | 25 | 2 |
