= 2021–22 Le Havre AC season =

Le Havre AC
2021–22 season
- President: Vincent Volpe
- Head coach: Paul Le Guen
- Stadium: Stade Océane
- Ligue 2: 8th
- Coupe de France: Eighth round
Home colours	Away colours

The 2021–22 season was the 151st season in the existence of Le Havre AC and the club's 13th consecutive season in the second division of French football. In addition to the domestic league, Le Havre participated in this season's edition of the Coupe de France.

== Players ==
=== First-team squad ===
As of 5 February 2022.

No.	Pos.	Nation	Player
1	GK	FRA	Mathieu Gorgelin
2	DF	MAR	Abdelwahed Wahib
4	DF	FRA	Thierno Baldé (on loan from Paris SG)
5	DF	CGO	Fernand Mayembo
6	DF	FRA	Isaak Touré
7	MF	FRA	Jean-Pascal Fontaine (vice-captain)
8	MF	FRA	Himad Abdelli
10	FW	FRA	Nabil Alioui
11	FW	FRA	Quentin Cornette
12	FW	FRA	Matthis Abline (on loan from Rennais)
14	FW	SEN	Jamal Thiaré
15	MF	FRA	Abdoullah Ba
16	GK	CIV	Mohamed Koné

No.	Pos.	Nation	Player
17	MF	FRA	Alexandre Bonnet (captain)
18	DF	CGO	Nolan Mbemba
19	DF	TUN	Ayman Ben Mohamed
20	DF	FRA	Ismaël Boura
21	FW	FRA	Ylan Gomes
22	MF	ALG	Victor Lekhal
23	FW	FRA	Josué Casimir
24	MF	FRA	Amir Richardson
25	FW	MTN	Pape Ibnou Bâ
27	DF	FRA	Pierre Gibaud
28	FW	FRA	Elies Mahmoud
29	DF	SEN	Arouna Sangante
30	GK	FRA	Yahia Fofana

=== Out on loan ===
Note: Flags indicate national team as defined under FIFA eligibility rules; some limited exceptions apply. Players may hold more than one non-FIFA nationality.

No.	Pos.	Nation	Player
—	DF	TUR	Ertuğrul Ersoy (on loan to Gaziantep)

== Transfers ==
=== In ===
Pos	Player	Transferred from	Fee	Date	Source
DF	(France) Thierno Baldé	(France) Paris Saint-Germain	Loan	13 July 2021	

== Pre-season and friendlies ==
Win Draw Loss

2 July 2021 Friendly	Le Havre	0–2	Amiens	Le Touquet, France
17:00 CEST (UTC+2)				Stadium: Stade Gerard Houllier

7 July 2021 Friendly	Quevilly-Rouen	0–1	Le Havre	Saint-Aubin-sur-Scie, France
18:00 CEST (UTC+2)				Stadium: Stade Jean Dasnias

10 July 2021 Friendly	Rennes	2–2	Le Havre	Dinard, France
18:00 CEST (UTC+2)	Salin (yellow card) 17'; Bourigeaud 41'; Guirassy 42'; Camavinga (yellow card) 73'		Bonnet 18' (pen.); Thiaré 26'; Gomes (yellow card) 76'	Stadium: Stade Paul Audrin; Attendance: 1,000; Referee: Benoît Millot

17 July 2021 Friendly	Lens	2–2	Le Havre	Le Touquet, France
15:30 CEST (UTC+2)	Banza 3', 58'		Alioui 16' (pen.); Gibaud 39'	Stadium: Stade Ferdi Petit
Note: The match was played in two halves 30 minutes each.

17 July 2021 Friendly	Lens	2–2	Le Havre	Le Touquet, France
16:45 CEST (UTC+2)	Oudjani 23'; Ganago 52'		Thiaré 12'; Abdelli 60'	Stadium: Stade Ferdi Petit
Note: The match was played in two halves 30 minutes each.

== Competitions ==
=== Overall record ===
Competition	First match	Last match	Starting round	Final position	Record							
Competition	First match	Last match	Starting round	Final position	Pld	W	D	L	GF	GA	GD	Win %
Ligue 2	24 July 2021	14 May 2022	Matchday 1	8th	38	13	11	14	38	41	−3	34.21
Coupe de France	13 November 2021	28 November 2021	Seventh round	Eighth round	2	1	1	0	2	0	+2	50.00
Total					40	14	12	14	40	41	−1	35.00

Source: Soccerway

=== Ligue 2 ===
==== League table ====
Pos	Team	Pld	W	D	L	GF	GA	GD	Pts
6	Guingamp	38	15	13	10	52	48	+4	58
7	Caen	38	13	11	14	51	42	+9	50
8	Le Havre	38	13	11	14	38	41	−3	50
9	Nîmes	38	14	7	17	44	51	−7	49
10	Pau	38	14	7	17	41	49	−8	49

Source: Ligue 2
Rules for classification: 1) Points; 2) Goal difference; 3) Number of goals scored; 4) Head-to-head goal difference; 5) Fair play points

==== Results summary ====
Overall								Home						Away					
Pld	W	D	L	GF	GA	GD	Pts	W	D	L	GF	GA	GD	W	D	L	GF	GA	GD
38	13	11	14	38	41	−3	50	6	5	8	17	20	−3	7	6	6	21	21	0

Source: Ligue 2

==== Results by round ====
Round	1	2	3	4	5	6	7	8	9	10	11	12	13	14	15	16	17	18	19	20	21	22	23	24	25	26	27	28	29	30	31	32	33	34	35	36	37	38
Ground	H	A	H	A	H	A	H	A	H	A	H	A	H	A	H	H	A	H	A	H	A	H	A	H	A	H	A	H	A	H	A	H	A	A	H	A	H	A
Result	D	W	L	D	W	D	D	D	W	W	W	D	W	L	D	D	W	L	W	L	D	D	D	L	L	W	W	L	L	L	L	W	W	W	L	L	L	L
Position	12	6	9	10	8	9	12	10	7	5	4	4	4	5	5	6	6	6	6	6	6	7	7	6	8	6	6	6	6	6	10	7	6	6	6	7	8	8

Source: Ligue 2
A = Away; H = Home; W = Win; D = Draw; L = Loss

==== Matches ====
The league fixtures were announced on 25 June 2021.

24 July 2021 1	Le Havre	0–0	Guingamp	Le Havre
20:00 CET (UTC+1)	Richardson (yellow card) 90'	Report	Lemonnier (yellow card) 23'; Sampaio (yellow card) 30'	Stadium: Stade Océane; Referee: Remi Landry

31 July 2021 2	Sochaux	0–2	Le Havre	Montbéliard
19:00 CEST (UTC+2)	Henry (yellow card) 6'; Thioune (yellow card) 47'; Weissbeck (yellow card) 90'	Report	Boutaïb 7', 27'	Stadium: Stade Auguste Bonal; Referee: Gael Angoula

7 August 2021 3	Le Havre	1–2	Paris FC	Le Havre
19:00 CEST (UTC+2)	Cornette 59'; Meraş (red card) 81'	Report	Gakpa 23'; Diakité (yellow card) 43'; Laura 63'	Stadium: Stade Océane; Referee: Arnaud Baert

14 August 2021 4	Rodez	0–0	Le Havre	Rodez
19:00 CET (UTC+1)	Boissier (yellow card) 14'	Report	Touré (yellow card) 9'	Stadium: Stade Paul-Lignon; Referee: Abdelatifa Kherradji

21 August 2021 5	Le Havre	2–1	Niort	Le Havre
19:00 CEST (UTC+2)	Thiaré 37', 56'; Sangante (yellow card) 71'; Bonnet (yellow card) 73'; Lekhal (yellow card) 85'	Report	Passi (yellow card) 25'; Vallier (yellow card) 33'; Renel 62'; Yongwa (yellow card) 81'	Stadium: Stade Océane; Referee: Marc Bollengier

28 August 2021 6	Bastia	0–0	Le Havre	Furiani
19:00 CEST (UTC+2)	Santelli (yellow card) 18'; Quemper (yellow card) 62'	Report	Richardson (yellow card) 52'; A. Ba (yellow card) 58'	Stadium: Stade Armand Cesari; Referee: Aurelien Petit

13 September 2021 7	Le Havre	1–1	Toulouse	Le Havre
20:45 CEST (UTC+2)	Boutaïb (red card) 62'; Cornette 67'; Lekhal (yellow card) 90+5'	Report	Rouault (yellow card) 13'; Onaiwu 34', (yellow card) 51'; Nicolaisen (yellow card) 55'; Desler (yellow card) 60'	Stadium: Stade Océane; Referee: Gael Angoula

18 September 2021 8	Nancy	1–1	Le Havre	Tomblaine
19:00 CEST (UTC+2)	Jung (yellow card) 35', (goal) 49' (pen.); Basila (yellow card) 37' (yellow-red card) 90+2'; El Aynaoui (yellow card) 90'	Report	Gibaud (yellow card) 41'; Cornette 56'; A. Ba (yellow card) 90+4'	Stadium: Stade Marcel Picot; Referee: Frank Schneider

21 September 2021 9	Le Havre	1–0	Quevilly-Rouen	Le Havre
20:45 CEST (UTC+2)	P. Bâ 7'; A. Ba (yellow card) 28'	Report	Gbellé (yellow card) 14'; Boé-Kane (yellow card) 55'	Stadium: Stade Océane; Referee: Mathieu Vernice

24 September 2021 10	Nîmes	0–1	Le Havre	Nîmes
19:00 CEST (UTC+2)	Ponceau (yellow card) 45'	Report	Boutaïb (yellow card) 37'; Thiaré 64'; Gibaud (yellow card) 80'	Stadium: Stade des Costières; Referee: Aurelien Petit

2 October 2021 11	Le Havre	2–0	Dijon	Le Havre
20:45 CEST (UTC+2)	Cornette 20'; Lekhal 62' (pen.); Mayembo (yellow card) 84'; Richardson (yellow card) 87'	Report		Stadium: Stade Océane; Referee: Marc Bollengier

16 October 2021 12	Caen	2–2	Le Havre	Caen
19:00 CEST (UTC+2)	Mendy 31'; Chahiri 58'; Deminguet (yellow card) 79'	Report	Boutaïb 8'; Mayembo (yellow card) 58'; Boutaïb (yellow card) 66'; Bâ 68'; Fofana (yellow card) 70'	Stadium: Stade Michel d'Ornano; Attendance: 16,729; Referee: Hakim Ben El Hadj

23 October 2021 13	Le Havre	1–0	Pau	Le Havre
19:00 CEST (UTC+2)	Kouassi 16' (o.g.); Cornette (yellow card) 59'	Report	Boto (yellow card) 47'; Sylvestre (yellow card) 80'	Stadium: Stade Océane; Referee: Abdelatifa Kherradji

30 October 2021 14	Dunkerque	1–0	Le Havre	Dunkerque
19:00 CEST (UTC+2)	A. Ba (yellow card) 40'; Brahimi 54'; Thiam (yellow card) 60'	Report	Boutaïb (yellow card) 40'; P. Bâ (yellow card) 57'	Stadium: Stade Marcel-Tribut; Referee: Pierre Legat

6 November 2021 15	Le Havre	0–0	Valenciennes	Le Havre
19:00 CEST (UTC+2)		Report	Ntim (yellow card) 90+2'	Stadium: Stade Océane; Referee: Arnaud Baert

20 November 2021 16	Le Havre	1–1	Amiens	Le Havre
19:00 CEST (UTC+2)	Cornette 42'	Report	Lomotey (yellow card) 40'; Bamba (yellow card) 74'; Lusamba 90' (pen.), (yellow card) 90+1'	Stadium: Stade Océane; Referee: Jérôme Miguelgorry

3 December 2021 17	Grenoble	1–2	Le Havre	Grenoble
19:00 CET (UTC+1)	Gaspar (yellow card) 42'; Monfray (yellow card) 52'; Henen 90+3'	Report	Lekhal (yellow card) 36'; Bonnet 43' (pen.); Sangante (yellow card) 55'; Alioui 86'	Stadium: Stade des Alpes; Referee: Marc Bollengier

11 December 2021 18	Le Havre	0–1	Ajaccio	Le Havre
19:00 CEST (UTC+2)	Lekhal (yellow card) 31'	Report	Courtet 85'	Stadium: Stade Océane; Referee: Jérôme Brisard

21 December 2021 19	Auxerre	2–3	Le Havre	Auxerre
20:45 CET (UTC+1)	Charbonnier (yellow card) 11' (yellow-red card) 90+4', (goal) 17', 90+1'; Hein (yellow card) 35'; Autret (yellow card) 63'; Bernard (yellow card) 90+7'	Report	Boura 3', (yellow card) 42' (yellow-red card) 68'; Alioui 41'; Boutaïb 61'; Fofana (yellow card) 79'; Bonnet (yellow card) 90+6'	Stadium: Stade de l'Abbé-Deschamps; Referee: Pierre Legat

8 January 2022 20	Le Havre	0–1	Sochaux	Le Havre
15:00 CET (UTC+1)	Touré (yellow card) 89'	Report	Aaneba (yellow card) 58'; Kitala 65', (yellow card) 69'	Stadium: Stade Océane; Referee: Marc Bollengier

17 January 2022 21	Paris FC	2–2	Le Havre	Paris
20:45 CET (UTC+1)	Gory 4'; Diakité 17'; Chergui (yellow card) 87'	Report	Boutaïb 60'; Alioui 63'	Stadium: Stade Sébastien Charléty; Referee: Bartolomeu Varela

22 January 2022 22	Le Havre	0–0	Rodez	Le Havre
15:00 CET (UTC+1)	Sangante (yellow card) 65'; Mayembo (yellow card) 76'; Abdelli (yellow card) 90+3'; Bonnet (yellow card) 90+6'	Report	Kerouedan (yellow card) 66'; M'Pasi (yellow card) 90+4'; David (yellow card) 90+4'	Stadium: Stade Océane; Referee: Abdelatifa Kherradji

5 February 2022 23	Niort	0–0	Le Havre	Niort
20:45 CET (UTC+1)		Report	Richardson (yellow card) 74'	Stadium: Stade René Gaillard; Referee: Arnaud Petit

14 February 2022 24	Le Havre	2–4	Bastia	Le Havre
20:45 CET (UTC+1)	Abdelli 9' (pen.); Abline 17' (pen.)	Report	Vincent 24'; Schur 29'; Magri 56'; Robic 90+4'	Stadium: Stade Océane; Referee: Jérôme Miguelgorry

21 February 2022 25	Toulouse	4–0	Le Havre	Toulouse
20:45 CET (UTC+1)	Spierings (yellow card) 19'; Nicolaisen 23'; Onaiwu 27'; Van den Boomen 48' (pen.); Evitt-Healey (yellow card) 71'; Ngoumou 80'	Report	Lekhal (yellow card) 22'; Bonnet (yellow card) 47'	Stadium: Stadium de Toulouse; Referee: Mathieu Vernice

26 January 2022 26	Le Havre	1–0	Nancy	Le Havre
19:00 CET (UTC+1)	Alioui 13'; Boura (yellow card) 40'	Report	Basila (yellow card) 15'; Bobichon (yellow card) 50'; Fontaine (yellow card) 63'	Stadium: Stade Océane; Referee: Bartolomeu Varela

5 March 2022 27	Quevilly-Rouen	0–2	Le Havre	Rouen
19:00 CET (UTC+1)	Boé-Kane (yellow card) 63'; Bansais (yellow card) 90+1'	Report	Abline 16'; Cornette 65'	Stadium: Stade Robert Diochon; Referee: Marc Bollengier

12 March 2022 28	Le Havre	0–1	Nîmes	Le Havre
19:00 CET (UTC+1)		Report	Fomba (yellow card) 35'; Benrahou 45+1' (pen.); Guessoum (yellow card) 75'	Stadium: Stade Océane; Referee: Pierre Legat

15 March 2022 29	Dijon	2–0	Le Havre	Dijon
20:00 CET (UTC+1)	Thiaré 51' (o.g.); Traoré 90'	Report	Wahib (yellow card) 29'; Lekhal (red card) 85'	Stadium: Stade Gaston Gérard; Referee: Aurelien Petit

19 March 2022 30	Le Havre	2–4	Caen	Le Havre
15:00 CET (UTC+1)	Boura (yellow card) 8'; Richardson (yellow card) 44'; Abline (yellow card) 58', (goal) 87'; Thiaré 71', (yellow card) 76'; Kumbedi (yellow card) 77' (yellow-red card) 78'; Cornette (yellow card) 83'; Gibaud (yellow card) 89'; Touré (yellow card) 90+1'; Bonnet (yellow card) 90+5'	Report	da Costa (yellow card) 34', (goal) 38'; Lepenant (yellow card) 50'; Diani (yellow card) 56'; Oniangué (yellow card) 64'; Deminguet 81' (pen.), (yellow card) 82', (goal) 90+2'; Jeannot 85'	Stadium: Stade Océane; Referee: Mathieu Vernice

2 April 2022 31	Pau	2–1	Le Havre	Pau
19:00 CET (UTC+1)	Armand 36'; Naidji 72'; Kouassi (yellow card) 90'	Report	Abline 23'; Gibaud (yellow card) 47'	Stadium: Nouste Camp; Referee: Gaël Angoula

9 April 2022 32	Le Havre	2–1	Dunkerque	Le Havre
15:00 CET (UTC+1)	Abdelli 19', (yellow card) 68', (goal) 89'; Sangante (yellow card) 41'; Lekhal (yellow card) 50'	Report	Ouadah (yellow card) 50'; Huysman (yellow card) 63'; Majouga 71'	Stadium: Stade Océane; Referee: Bartolomeu Varela

16 April 2022 33	Valenciennes	0–1	Le Havre	Valenciennes
19:00 CET (UTC+1)	Chevalier (yellow card) 15'; Masson (yellow card) 75'; Linguet (yellow card) 81'	Report	Abline 14', (yellow card) 81'; Richardson (yellow card) 89'	Stadium: Stade du Hainaut; Referee: Pierre Legat

19 April 2022 34	Amiens	0–2	Le Havre	Amiens
19:00 CET (UTC+1)	Mendy (yellow card) 30'; Badji (yellow card) 42'; Bamba (yellow card) 69'	Report	Wahib (yellow card) 32'; Alioui 59'; Gibaud (yellow card) 69'; Sangante 73'	Stadium: Stade de la Licorne; Referee: Alexandre Perreau Niel

22 April 2022 35	Le Havre	0–1	Grenoble	Le Havre
21:00 CET (UTC+1)		Report	Sanyang 72'	Stadium: Stade Océane; Referee: Arnaud Baert

30 April 2022 36	Ajaccio	2–1	Le Havre	Ajaccio
19:00 CET (UTC+1)	Courtet 9'; Barreto 21'; Marchetti (yellow card) 32'; Laçi (yellow card) 90+4'	Report	Abline 8'; Abdelli (yellow card) 44'	Stadium: Stade François Coty; Referee: Aurelien Petit

7 May 2022 37	Le Havre	1–2	Auxerre	Le Havre
21:00 CET (UTC+1)	P. Bâ 15', (yellow card) 41'; Bonnet (yellow card) 30'	Report	Pellenard (yellow card) 36'; Jubal (yellow card) 41' (yellow-red card) 61'; Hein 54'; Charbonnier 66'	Stadium: Stade Océane; Referee: Nicolas Rainville

14 May 2022 38	Guingamp	2–1	Le Havre	Guingamp
19:00 CEST (UTC+2)	M'Changama 38'; Merghem 76'	Report	Roux 32' (o.g.)	Stadium: Stade de Roudourou; Referee: Amaury Delerue
