= 2023–24 Le Havre AC season =

Le Havre AC
2023–24 season
- President: Vincent Volpe
- Head coach: Luka Elsner
- Stadium: Stade Océane
- Ligue 1: 15th
- Coupe de France: Round of 16
- Top goalscorer: League: André Ayew; Mohamed Bayo; Emmanuel Sabbi (5 each); All: André Ayew (6)
Home colours	Away colours

The 2023–24 season was Le Havre Athletic Club's 130th season in existence and first season back in Ligue 1. They also competed in the Coupe de France.

== Players ==
=== First-team squad ===
As of 22 January 2024

No.	Pos.	Nation	Player
1	GK	FRA	Mathieu Gorgelin
4	DF	FRA	Gautier Lloris
5	MF	MAR	Oussama Targhalline
6	DF	FRA	Étienne Youte Kinkoue
7	DF	HUN	Loïc Négo
8	MF	MAR	Yassine Kechta
9	FW	GUI	Mohamed Bayo (on loan from Lille)
10	FW	FRA	Nabil Alioui
11	FW	USA	Emmanuel Sabbi
12	DF	FRA	Mathéo Bodmer
13	FW	FRA	Steve Ngoura
14	MF	RUS	Daler Kuzyayev
15	FW	FRA	Kandet Diawara
16	GK	CIV	Mohamed Koné
17	DF	MAR	Oualid El Hajjam
19	MF	SEN	Rassoul Ndiaye

No.	Pos.	Nation	Player
20	FW	FRA	Élysée Logbo
21	FW	FRA	Antoine Joujou
22	DF	GUF	Yoann Salmier
23	FW	GLP	Josué Casimir
24	DF	FRA	Cheick Doumbia
25	MF	FRA	Alois Confais
26	MF	CMR	Simon Ebonog
27	DF	CIV	Christopher Opéri (vice-captain)
28	MF	GHA	André Ayew
29	FW	FRA	Samuel Grandsir
30	GK	FRA	Arthur Desmas
35	DF	FRA	Yoni Gomis
37	MF	FRA	Mokrane Bentoumi
93	DF	SEN	Arouna Sangante (captain)
94	MF	GUI	Abdoulaye Touré (3rd captain)

=== Out on loan ===
Note: Flags indicate national team as defined under FIFA eligibility rules; some limited exceptions apply. Players may hold more than one non-FIFA nationality.

No.	Pos.	Nation	Player
—	GK	CIV	Mohamed Koné (at Dunkerque until 30 June 2024)
—	DF	FRA	Djamal Moussadek (at Villefranche until 30 June 2024)
—	FW	MTN	Pape Ibnou Ba (at Concarneau until 30 June 2024)

No.	Pos.	Nation	Player
—	FW	SEN	Issa Soumaré (at Auxerre until 30 June 2024)
—	FW	MAR	Nassim Chadli (at Concarneau until 30 June 2024)
—	FW	COD	Yann Kitala (at Almere City until 30 June 2024)

== Transfers ==
=== In ===
Pos.	Player	Transferred from	Fee	Date	Source
DF	(Hungary) Loïc Nego	(Hungary) Fehérvár	Free	1 July 2023	
MF	(Senegal) Issa Soumaré	(Belgium) Beerschot	€400,000	4 July 2023	
MF	(Russia) Daler Kuzyayev	(Russia) Zenit Saint Petersburg	Free	12 July 2023	
MF	(Senegal) Rassoul Ndiaye	(France) Sochaux	€1,500,000	17 July 2023	
MF	(Guinea) Abdoulaye Touré	(Italy) Genoa	Undisclosed	26 July 2023	
FW	(Guinea) Mohamed Bayo	(France) Lille	Loan	1 September 2023	
FW	(Ghana) André Ayew	Unattached	Free	11 November 2023	

=== Out ===
Pos.	Player	Transferred to	Fee	Date	Source
MF	(Senegal) Issa Soumaré	(France) Auxerre	Loan	12 January 2024	
GK	(Ivory Coast) Mohamed Koné	(France) USL Dunkerque	Loan	18 January 2024	
MF	(Republic of the Congo) Nolan Mbemba	(France) Grenoble Foot 38	Free	22 January 2024	
MF	(France) Nabil Alioui	(Turkey) Adana Demirspor	Undisclosed	2 February 2024	

== Pre-season and friendlies ==
Win Draw Loss

26 July 2023 Friendly	Lille	3–2	Le Havre	Camphin-en-Pévèle
17:00 CEST (UTC+2)				Stadium: Complexe Sportif de Luchin

29 July 2023 Friendly	Lorient	2–0	Le Havre	Dinan
17:00 CEST (UTC+2)	Laporte 55'; Koné 90+2'			Stadium: Stade du Clos Gastel

5 August 2023 Friendly	Clermont	1–0	Le Havre	Orléans
17:00 CEST (UTC+2)				Stadium: Stade Marcel-Garcin

5 August 2023 Friendly	Clermont	2–1	Le Havre	Orléans
19:00 CEST (UTC+2)				Stadium: Stade Marcel-Garcin
Note: Match was played in two periods of thirty-five minutes each.

8 September 2023 Friendly	Le Havre	1–0	Caen	Saint-Laurent-de-Brévedent
14:30 CEST (UTC+2)				Stadium: Centre Technique de St Laurent Annexe 1

== Competitions ==
=== Overall record ===
Competition	First match	Last match	Starting round	Final position	Record							
Competition	First match	Last match	Starting round	Final position	Pld	W	D	L	GF	GA	GD	Win %
Ligue 1	13 August 2023	19 May 2024	Matchday 1	15th	34	7	11	16	34	45	−11	20.59
Coupe de France	7 January 2024	7 February 2024	Round of 64	Round of 16	3	2	0	1	4	4	+0	66.67
Total					37	9	11	17	38	49	−11	24.32

Source: Soccerway

=== Ligue 1 ===
==== League table ====
Pos	Team	Pld	W	D	L	GF	GA	GD	Pts	Qualification or relegation
13	Strasbourg	34	10	9	15	38	50	−12	39	
14	Nantes	34	9	6	19	30	55	−25	33	
15	Le Havre	34	7	11	16	34	45	−11	32	
16	Metz (R)	34	8	5	21	35	58	−23	29 (Note: Metz finished ahead of Lorient on head-to-head away goals scored: Lorient 2–3 Metz, Metz 1–2 Lorient.)	Qualification for the Relegation play-offs
17	Lorient (R)	34	7	8	19	43	66	−23	29	Relegation to Ligue 2

Source: Ligue 1
Rules for classification: 1) Points; 2) Goal difference; 3) Head-to-head points; 4) Head-to-head goal difference; 5) Head-to-head goals scored; 6) Head-to-head away goals scored; 7) Goals scored; 8) Away goals scored; 9) Fair-play points (Note: Head-to-head record is used only after all the matches between the teams in question have been played).
(R) Relegated

==== Results summary ====
Overall								Home						Away					
Pld	W	D	L	GF	GA	GD	Pts	W	D	L	GF	GA	GD	W	D	L	GF	GA	GD
34	7	11	16	34	45	−11	32	6	2	9	18	19	−1	1	9	7	16	26	−10

Source: Ligue 1

==== Results by round ====
Round	1	2	3	4	5	6	7	8	9	10	11	12	13	14	15	16	17	18	19	20	21	22	23	24	25	26	27	28	29	30	31	32	33	34
Ground	A	H	A	H	A	H	H	A	H	A	A	H	A	H	A	H	A	H	A	A	H	A	H	A	H	A	H	A	H	H	A	H	A	H
Result	D	L	D	W	D	W	L	L	D	D	W	D	D	L	L	W	L	W	D	D	L	L	L	L	W	L	L	D	L	L	D	W	L	L
Position	7	13	14	10	11	7	10	13	11	13	7	7	8	10	11	10	11	11	11	11	11	12	14	15	12	13	15	14	15	16	15	15	15	15

Source: Ligue 1
A = Away; H = Home; W = Win; D = Draw; L = Loss

==== Matches ====
The league fixtures were unveiled on 29 June 2023.

13 August 2023 1	Montpellier	2–2	Le Havre	Montpellier
15:00 CEST (UTC+2)	Jullien (yellow card) 48'; Adams 58', 60'	Report	Lloris 6'; Sangante (yellow card) 55'; Targhalline (yellow card) 65'; Grandsir 90+1'	Stadium: Stade de la Mosson; Attendance: 15,852; Referee: Clément Turpin

20 August 2023 2	Le Havre	1–2	Brest	Le Havre
15:00 CEST (UTC+2)	Kuzyayev 52'	Report	Del Castillo 28'; Camara (yellow card) 47'; Brassier 56'; Camblan (yellow card) 89'	Stadium: Stade Océane; Attendance: 19,575; Referee: Florent Batta

27 August 2023 3	Rennes	2–2	Le Havre	Rennes
13:00 CEST (UTC+2)	Blas 10'; Wooh 24'; Matić (yellow card) 75'	Report	Alioui 40', 70'; Grandsir (yellow card) 45+1' (yellow-red card) 62'	Stadium: Roazhon Park; Attendance: 28,311; Referee: Eric Wattelier

3 September 2023 4	Le Havre	3–0	Lorient	Le Havre
15:00 CEST (UTC+2)	Kuzyayev 52'; Alioui 70'; Mbemba 90+6'	Report		Stadium: Stade Océane; Attendance: 18,707; Referee: Romain Lissorgue

17 September 2023 5	Lyon	0–0	Le Havre	Lyon
20:45 CEST (UTC+2)	Lacazette (yellow card) 5'; Mata (yellow card) 41'; Kumbedi (yellow card) 79'	Report	Bayo (yellow card) 38'; Casimir (yellow card) 65'	Stadium: Parc Olympique Lyonnais; Attendance: 35,507; Referee: Benoît Bastien

24 September 2023 6	Le Havre	2–1	Clermont	Le Havre
15:00 CEST (UTC+2)	Alioui 4'; Bayo 7'; Sangate (yellow card) 48'; Desmas (yellow card) 50'	Report	Gastien (yellow card) 22'; Konaté 45+2'; Nicholson (yellow card) 52'; Seidu (yellow card) 85'	Stadium: Stade Océane; Attendance: 18,071; Referee: Mathieu Vernice

1 October 2023 7	Le Havre	0–2	Lille	Le Havre
15:00 CEST (UTC+2)		Report	Zhegrova 40'; Salmier 52' (o.g.)	Stadium: Stade Océane; Attendance: 21,919; Referee: Bastien Dechepy

8 October 2023 8	Marseille	3–0	Le Havre	Marseille
13:00 CEST (UTC+2)	Sangante 18' (o.g.); Aubameyang 21'; Sarr 84'	Report	Ndiaye (yellow card) 12' (yellow-red card) 40'; Casimir (yellow card) 51'	Stadium: Stade Vélodrome; Attendance: 63,576; Referee: Thomas Léonard

20 October 2023 9	Le Havre	0–0	Lens	Le Havre
21:00 CEST (UTC+2)	Sabbi (yellow card) 29'; Sangante (yellow card) 65'	Report	Diouf (yellow card) 12'; Danso (yellow card) 20'; Frankowski (yellow card) 34'	Stadium: Stade Océane; Attendance: 23,590; Referee: François Letexier

29 October 2023 10	Metz	0–0	Le Havre	Metz
15:00 CET (UTC+1)	N'Duquidi (yellow card) 45+2'; Udol (yellow card) 62'	Report	Salmier (yellow card) 42'; Bayo (yellow card) 56'	Stadium: Stade Saint-Symphorien; Attendance: 20,718; Referee: Hakim Ben El Hadj

5 November 2023 11	Toulouse	1–2	Le Havre	Toulouse
15:00 CET (UTC+1)	Costa (yellow card) 30'; Dallinga (penalty missed) 45+3', 50'; Schmidt (yellow card) 45+4'	Report	Casimir (yellow card) 45+2'; Bayo 83', 90+5'; Ndiaye (yellow card) 85'	Stadium: Stadium de Toulouse; Attendance: 23,060; Referee: Marc Bollengier

11 November 2023 12	Le Havre	0–0	Monaco	Le Havre
21:00 CET (UTC+1)	Bayo (yellow card) 10'; Touré (yellow card) 68'; Grandsir (penalty missed) 90+10'	Report	Zakaria (yellow card) 21'; Diop (yellow card) 90+7'; Fofana (yellow card) 90+9'	Stadium: Stade Océane; Attendance: 23,008; Referee: Thomas Léonard

26 November 2023 13	Nantes	0–0	Le Havre	Nantes
15:00 CET (UTC+1)	Pierre-Gabriel (yellow card) 45'	Report	Ayew (red card) 67'; Ndiaye (yellow card) 85'; Sangante (yellow card) 90+6'	Stadium: Stade de la Beaujoire; Attendance: 29,346; Referee: Miguel Nogueira

3 December 2023 14	Le Havre	0–2	Paris Saint-Germain	Le Havre
13:00 CET (UTC+1)	Opéri (yellow card) 68'; Alioui (yellow card) 76'	Report	Donnarumma (red card) 10'; Mbappé 23'; Pereira (yellow card) 87'; Vitinha 89'	Stadium: Stade Océane; Attendance: 24,569; Referee: Bastien Dechepy

10 December 2023 15	Strasbourg	2–1	Le Havre	Strasbourg
15:00 CET (UTC+1)	Emegha 21'; Sissoko (yellow card) 26'; Perrin (yellow card) 40'; Delaine (yellow card) 73'; Sylla 90+7'	Report	Salmier (yellow card) 27', (goal) 49'	Stadium: Stade de la Meinau; Attendance: 25,173; Referee: Benoît Millot

16 December 2023 16	Le Havre	3–1	Nice	Le Havre
17:00 CET (UTC+1)	Sabbi 5', 35', (yellow card) 27'; Bayo 51' (pen.); Targhalline (yellow card) 62'; Grandsir (yellow card) 81', (red card) 81'	Report	Bard (yellow card) 56'; Dante (yellow card) 79'; Todibo (red card) 81'; Louchet 90+1'	Stadium: Stade Océane; Attendance: 21,971; Referee: Jérémie Pignard

20 December 2023 17	Reims	1–0	Le Havre	Reims
21:00 CET (UTC+1)	Nakamura 25'; Foket (yellow card) 86'	Report	Ndiaye (red card) 21'; Casimir (yellow card) 54'	Stadium: Stade Auguste-Delaune; Attendance: 14,835; Referee: Stéphanie Frappart

14 January 2024 18	Le Havre	3–1	Lyon	Le Havre
17:05 CET (UTC+1)	Lloris 18'; Sabbi 50'; Opéri 62', (yellow card) 87'	Report	O'Brien (red card) 30'; Lacazette 54'; Ćaleta-Car (red card) 90'	Stadium: Stade Océane; Attendance: 23,146; Referee: Gaël Angoula

28 January 2024 19	Lorient	3–3	Le Havre	Lorient
15:00 CET (UTC+1)	Katseris (yellow card) 17'; Louza 33', (yellow card) 45'; Le Bris (yellow card) 36'; Ponceau (yellow card) 42'; Kari 51'; Bamba 90+2'	Report	Sabbi 15' (pen.), (yellow card) 43'; Kinkoue (yellow card) 25'; Kechta (yellow card) 48'; Opéri (yellow card) 73'; Ayew 85', 90+4'	Stadium: Stade du Moustoir; Attendance: 15,207; Referee: Jérémy Stinat

4 February 2024 20	Monaco	1–1	Le Havre	Monaco
13:00 CET (UTC+1)	Magassa (yellow card) 33'; Ben Yedder 63', (yellow card) 75'; Golovin (yellow card) 90+2'	Report	Casimir (yellow card) 51'; Joujou (yellow card) 60'; Fofana 65' (o.g.)	Stadium: Stade Louis II; Attendance: 5,962; Referee: Jérôme Brisard

11 February 2024 21	Le Havre	0–1	Rennes	Le Havre
13:00 CET (UTC+1)	Touré (yellow card) 36'; Ayew (yellow card) 71'	Report	Bourigeaud 60'; Seidu (yellow card) 79'	Stadium: Stade Océane; Attendance: 22,702; Referee: Benoît Millot

17 February 2024 22	Lille	3–0	Le Havre	Villeneuve-d'Ascq
17:00 CET (UTC+1)	David 14', 44', 49', (penalty missed) 49'; Bentaleb (yellow card) 36'; Haraldsson (yellow card) 68'	Report	Lloris (yellow card) 18'; Touré (yellow card) 65'; Opéri (yellow card) 83'	Stadium: Stade Pierre-Mauroy; Attendance: 40,317; Referee: Jérémie Pignard

25 February 2024 23	Le Havre	1–2	Reims	Le Havre
15:00 CET (UTC+1)	Négo (yellow card) 74'; Touré 74' (pen.); Sangante (yellow card) 90+4'; Gorgelin (yellow card) 90+5'	Report	Foket (yellow card) 24' (yellow-red card) 67'; Daramy 64', 90+4' (pen.); De Smet (yellow card) 73'	Stadium: Stade Océane; Attendance: 22,046; Referee: Florent Batta

3 March 2024 24	Brest	1–0	Le Havre	Brest
15:00 CET (UTC+1)	Lees-Melou 34', (yellow card) 83'; Del Castillo (yellow card) 52'; Martin (yellow card) 72'; Satriano (yellow card) 76'	Report	El Hajjam (yellow card) 55'	Stadium: Stade Francis-Le Blé; Attendance: 14,718; Referee: Pierre Gaillouste

10 March 2024 25	Le Havre	1–0	Toulouse	Le Havre
15:00 CET (UTC+1)	Opéri 60', (yellow card) 84'; Ngoura (yellow card) 90+5'	Report	Keben (yellow card) 90+5'	Stadium: Stade Océane; Attendance: 21,462; Referee: Romain Lissorgue

17 March 2024 26	Clermont	2–1	Le Havre	Clermont-Ferrand
15:00 CET (UTC+1)	Cham 12', 45+3' (pen.); Keïta (yellow card) 31'; Rashani (yellow card) 31', (red card) 31'; Gastien (yellow card) 47'	Report	Targhalline (yellow card) 34' (yellow-red card) 66'; Ayew 45+1'; Lloris (yellow card) 45+3'; Sangante (yellow card) 58'; Kechta (yellow card) 90+7'	Stadium: Stade Gabriel-Montpied; Attendance: 9,638; Referee: Marc Bollengier

31 March 2024 27	Le Havre	0–2	Montpellier	Le Havre
15:00 CEST (UTC+2)	Négo (yellow card) 31'; Casimir (yellow card) 70'	Report	Sagnan (yellow card) 70'; Omeragić (yellow card) 70'; Ferri 72'; Jullien 80'	Stadium: Stade Océane; Attendance: 20,556; Referee: Mathieu Vernice

6 April 2024 28	Lens	1–1	Le Havre	Lens
17:00 CEST (UTC+2)	Frankowski 58'; Gradit (yellow card) 62'; Aguilar (yellow card) 73'	Report	Ayew (yellow card) 51'; Opéri (yellow card) 63'; Kechta (yellow card) 69'; Sabbi 78' (pen.); Touré (yellow card) 90+2'; Bayo (yellow card) 90+5'	Stadium: Stade Bollaert-Delelis; Attendance: 38,223; Referee: François Letexier

14 April 2024 29	Le Havre	0–1	Nantes	Le Havre
13:00 CEST (UTC+2)	Sabbi (yellow card) 16'; Kuzyayev (yellow card) 83'; Grandsir (yellow card) 90+1'	Report	Pallois (yellow card) 66'; Bamba 90+3', (yellow card) 90+4'	Stadium: Stade Océane; Attendance: 23,021; Referee: Hakim Ben El Hadj

21 April 2024 30	Le Havre	0–1	Metz	Le Havre
15:00 CEST (UTC+2)	Sangante (yellow card) 21'; Nego (yellow card) 72'; Traoré (yellow card) 44'	Report	N'Doram (yellow card) 16'; Mikautadze 46'; Oukidja (yellow card) 78'; Jean Jacques (yellow card) 84'	Stadium: Stade Océane; Attendance: 21,250; Referee: Marc Bollengier

27 April 2024 31	Paris Saint-Germain	3–3	Le Havre	Paris
21:00 CEST (UTC+2)	Barcola 29'; Zaïre-Emery (yellow card) 75'; Hakimi 78'; K. Mbappé (yellow card) 90+3'; Ramos 90+5'	Report	Opéri 19'; Ayew 38'; Touré 61' (pen.); Sangante (yellow card) 90+7'	Stadium: Parc des Princes; Attendance: 47,922; Referee: Willy Delajod

4 May 2024 32	Le Havre	3–1	Strasbourg	Le Havre
15:00 CEST (UTC+2)	Kechta 24', 65', (yellow card) 54'; Salmier (yellow card) 41'; Desmas (yellow card) 88'; Ayew 90+6'	Report	Sissoko (yellow card) 75'; Guilbert 86'	Stadium: Stade Océane; Attendance: 22,293; Referee: Jérôme Brisard

10 May 2024 33	Nice	1–0	Le Havre	Nice
21:00 CEST (UTC+2)	Boga 12'; Todibo (yellow card) 16'; Bard (yellow card) 65'	Report		Stadium: Allianz Riviera; Attendance: 24,529; Referee: Benoît Bastien

19 May 2024 34	Le Havre	1–2	Marseille	Le Havre
21:00 CEST (UTC+2)	Sabbi (yellow card) 82'; Bayo 90+7' (pen.)	Report	Aubameyang 64'; Murillo 77'	Stadium: Stade Océane; Attendance: 24,050; Referee: Jérémy Stinat

=== Coupe de France ===
7 January 2024 Round of 64	Le Havre	2–1	Caen	Le Havre
14:30 CET (UTC+1)	Joujou 16'; Kuzyayev 43'; Sangante (yellow card) 49'; Kechta (yellow card) 55'	Report	Kyeremeh 26'; Henry (yellow card) 90+2'	Stadium: Stade Océane; Attendance: 20,198; Referee: Benoît Bastien

21 January 2024 Round of 32	Châteauroux	0–1	Le Havre	Châteauroux
17:30 CET (UTC+1)	Mille (yellow card) 88'	Report	Ngoura 45+1'; Kinkoue (yellow card) 70'	Stadium: Stade Gaston-Petit; Attendance: 3,313; Referee: Nicolas Rainville

7 February 2024 Round of 16	Strasbourg	3–1	Le Havre	Strasbourg
20:30 CET (UTC+1)	Bakwa 21'; Sissoko (yellow card) 31'; Emegha 36'; Senaya 90'	Report	Ayew (yellow card) 17', (goal) 30'; Ndiaye (yellow card) 39'; Kuzyayev (red card) 80'	Stadium: Stade de la Meinau; Attendance: 19,653; Referee: Clément Turpin
