= Josué Casimir =

Guadeloupean footballer (born 2001)

Personal information
- Date of birth: 24 September 2001 (age 25)
- Place of birth: Baie-Mahault, Guadeloupe, France
- Height: 1.78 m (5 ft 10 in)
- Positions: Right-back; right wing-back

Team information
- Current team: Dynamo Moscow (on loan from Auxerre)
- Number: 77

Senior career*
Years	Team	Apps	(Gls)
2018–2022	Le Havre II	52	(7)
2020–2025	Le Havre	98	(6)
2025–	Auxerre	33	(1)
2026–	→ Dynamo Moscow (loan)	5	(0)

International career^{‡}
2020	Guadeloupe U20	3	(3)
2025–	Haiti	12	(0)
- * Club domestic league appearances and goals as of 22 November 2026 ‡ National team caps and goals as of 17 November 2026

Josué Casimir (born 24 September 2001) is a professional footballer who plays as a right-back, right wing-back or striker for Russian Premier League club Dynamo Moscow on loan from French club Auxerre. Born in Guadeloupe, he represents the Haiti national team.

== Club career ==
Casimir made his professional debut with Le Havre in a 1–0 Ligue 2 win over USL Dunkerque on 24 October 2020.

On 6 June 2025, Casimir signed a three-season contract with Auxerre.

On 10 September 2026, Casimir was loaned by Dynamo Moscow in Russia for the 2026–27 season, with an option to buy.

== International career ==
Casimir was born in the French overseas territory Guadeloupe to Haitian parents. He holds French and Haitian descent. He played for the Guadeloupe U20s at the 2020 CONCACAF U-20 Championship qualifying matches, with three goals in three games. He was called up to the Haiti national team for a set of 2026 FIFA World Cup qualification matches in October 2025.

On 15 May 2026, he was included in Haiti head coach Sébastien Migné's 26-man squad for the 2026 FIFA World Cup.

== Personal life ==
Casimir is the younger brother of the Guadeloupean international footballer Stevenson Casimir.

== Career statistics ==
=== Club ===
As of match played 22 November 2026

Appearances and goals by club, season and competition
Club	Season	League			Coupe de France		Total	
Club	Season	Division	Apps	Goals	Apps	Goals	Apps	Goals
Le Havre II	2017–18	CFA 2	5	0	—		5	0
Le Havre II	2018–19	CFA 2	15	0	—		15	0
Le Havre II	2019–20	National 3	11	1	—		11	1
Le Havre II	2020–21	National 3	4	2	—		4	2
Le Havre II	2021–22	National 3	17	4	—		17	4
Le Havre II	Total		52	7	—		52	7
Le Havre	2020–21	Ligue 2	5	0	1	0	6	0
Le Havre	2021–22	Ligue 2	2	0	1	0	3	0
Le Havre	2022–23	Ligue 2	34	2	1	0	35	2
Le Havre	2023–24	Ligue 1	30	0	3	0	33	0
Le Havre	2024–25	Ligue 1	25	4	0	0	25	4
Le Havre	Total		96	6	6	0	102	6
Auxerre	2025–26	Ligue 1	31	1	0	0	31	1
Auxerre	2026–27	Ligue 1	2	0	0	0	2	0
Auxerre	Total		33	1	0	0	33	1
Dynamo Moscow (loan)	2026–27	Russian Premier League	5	0	2	0	7	0
Career total			187	14	8	0	195	14

=== International ===
As of match played 17 November 2026

Appearances and goals by national team and year
National team	Year	Apps	Goals
Haiti	2025	4	0
Haiti	2026	8	0
Total		12	0
