= Mathéo Bodmer =

French footballer (born 2004)

Personal information
- Date of birth: 6 May 2004 (age 22)
- Place of birth: Lille, France
- Height: 1.79 m (5 ft 10 in)
- Position: Midfielder

Team information
- Current team: Le Havre B

Youth career
- 2010–2011: Évreux FC 27
- 2011: FO Plaisir
- 2012–2016: AG Caennaise
- 2017–2023: Le Havre

Senior career*
Years	Team	Apps	(Gls)
2021–	Le Havre B	37	(1)
2021–	Le Havre	2	(0)
2025–2026	→ Bourg-Péronnas (loan)	30	(0)
- * Club domestic league appearances and goals as of 23 June 2026

Mathéo Bodmer (born 6 May 2004) is a French professional footballer who plays as a midfielder for Le Havre B.

== Club career ==
A youth academy graduate of Le Havre, Bodmer made his professional debut for the club on 15 May 2021 in a 3–2 league win against Troyes. On 16 June 2023, he signed his first professional contract with the club until June 2026.

For the 2025–26 season, Bodmer was loaned by Bourg-Péronnas in Championnat National.

== International career ==
Bodmer is uncapped at international level, but has received call-up to France under-17 team in March 2021.

== Personal life ==
Bodmer is the son of former footballer Mathieu Bodmer.

== Career statistics ==
=== Club ===
As of 8 February 2025

Appearances and goals by club, season and competition
Club	Season	League			Cup		Continental		Total	
Club	Season	Division	Apps	Goals	Apps	Goals	Apps	Goals	Apps	Goals
Le Havre B	2020–21	National 3	0	0	—		—		0	0
Le Havre B	2021–22	National 3	1	0	—		—		1	0
Le Havre B	2022–23	National 3	11	0	—		—		11	0
Le Havre B	2023–24	National 3	25	1	—		—		25	1
Le Havre B	Total		37	1	—		—		37	1
Le Havre	2020–21	Ligue 2	1	0	0	0	—		1	0
Le Havre	2024–25	Ligue 1	1	0	1	0	—		2	0
Le Havre	Total		2	0	1	0	—		3	0
Career total			39	1	1	0	0	0	40	1
