= Arthur Desmas =

French footballer (born 1994)

Personal information
- Date of birth: 7 April 1994 (age 32)
- Place of birth: Brest, France
- Height: 1.96 m (6 ft 5 in)
- Position: Goalkeeper

Youth career
- 2005–2015: Brest

Senior career*
Years	Team	Apps	(Gls)
2013–2015	Brest II	16	(0)
2015–2018	Niort II	31	(0)
2015–2018	Niort	2	(0)
2018–2020	Rodez	59	(0)
2020–2022	Clermont	51	(0)
2022–2025	Le Havre	82	(0)
2025–2026	Al-Duhail	0	(0)
- * Club domestic league appearances and goals as of 25 May 2025

Arthur Desmas (born 7 April 1994) is a French professional footballer who plays as a goalkeeper.

Desmas came through the youth system at his hometown club Stade Brestois but failed to break into the first team and joined Chamois Niortais in the summer of 2015. He made his professional debut in November 2016 in a Coupe de France match against Stade Montois and made his first league appearance later the same season.

== Career ==
Born in Brest in north-west France, Desmas played junior football for Ploumoguer before joining the youth setup at Stade Brestois at the age of 11. Initially an outfield player, he transitioned to playing in goal due to his above-average height. During his ten years at Brest, he represented France at under-17 level, and went on to play several matches in the Championnat de France Amateur 2 (CFA2) for the club's reserve team between 2012 and 2015.

At the end of the 2014–15 season, Desmas was offered a trial by Ligue 2 club Chamois Niortais, who were in search of a new goalkeeper following the departures of Rodolphe Roche and Lucas Bobe. The trial period was successful and Desmas signed a one-year professional contract with the club on 23 June 2015. During his first season at Niort, Desmas was third-choice goalkeeper behind Paul Delecroix and Saturnin Allagbé, and as such was restricted mainly to reserve-team action, making 17 appearances in the CFA2. He also made the first-team substitutes' bench on six occasions, and at the end of the season was offered a two-year contract extension.

Following the sale of Delecroix to Lorient in the summer of 2016, Desmas was promoted to second-choice goalkeeper behind Allagbé, with new signing Alexandre Bouchard taking over as third-choice. Desmas made his senior debut for Niort on 11 November 2016 in the 2–1 away victory over Stade Montois in the seventh round of the Coupe de France. He went on to play in all five of the team's Coupe de France matches during the 2016–17 season, a run which ended at the last-16 stage of the competition with a 0–2 home defeat to French champions Paris Saint-Germain thanks to late goals from Javier Pastore and Edinson Cavani. On 12 May 2017, Desmas made his first Ligue 2 appearance, selected in place of Allagbé for Niort's final home match of the season against Strasbourg. The match ended in a 2–2 draw.

On 1 July 2022, Desmas joined Le Havre on a three-year contract.

On 29 September 2025, Desmas joined Al-Duhail on a one-year contract.

== Career statistics ==
As of match played 30 March 2025

Appearances and goals by club, season and competition
Club	Season	League			National cup		League cup		Europe		Other		Total	
Club	Season	Division	Apps	Goals	Apps	Goals	Apps	Goals	Apps	Goals	Apps	Goals	Apps	Goals
Brest II	2012–13	CFA 2	3	0	—		—		—		—		3	0
Brest II	2013–14	CFA 2	7	0	—		—		—		—		7	0
Brest II	2014–15	CFA 2	6	0	—		—		—		—		6	0
Brest II	Total		16	0	—		—		—		—		16	0
Niort II	2015–16	CFA 2	17	0	—		—		—		—		17	0
Niort II	2016–17	CFA 2	8	0	—		—		—		—		8	0
Niort II	2017–18	National 3	6	0	—		—		—		—		6	0
Niort II	Total		31	0	—		—		—		—		31	0
Niort	2015–16	Ligue 2	0	0	0	0	0	0	—		—		0	0
Niort	2016–17	Ligue 2	1	0	5	0	0	0	—		—		6	0
Niort	2017–18	Ligue 2	1	2	0	0	1	0	—		—		2	0
Niort	Total		2	0	5	0	1	0	—		—		8	0
Rodez	2018–19	National	32	0	0	0	—		—		—		32	0
Rodez	2019–20	Ligue 2	27	0	0	0	1	0	—		—		28	0
Rodez	Total		59	0	0	0	1	0	—		—		60	0
Clermont	2020–21	Ligue 2	36	0	0	0	—		—		—		36	0
Clermont	2021–22	Ligue 1	15	0	2	0	—		—		—		17	0
Clermont	Total		51	0	2	0	—		—		—		53	0
Le Havre	2022–23	Ligue 2	31	0	0	0	—		—		—		31	0
Le Havre	2023–24	Ligue 1	33	0	0	0	—		—		—		33	0
Le Havre	2024–25	Ligue 1	18	0	0	0	—		—		—		18	0
Le Havre	Total		82	0	0	0	—		—		—		82	0
Career total			241	0	7	0	2	0	0	0	0	0	250	0

== Honours ==
Individual

- Ligue 2 Goalkeeper of the Year: 2022–23
- UNFP Ligue 2 Team of the Year: 2022–23
