= Amir Richardson =

French-Moroccan footballer (born 2002)

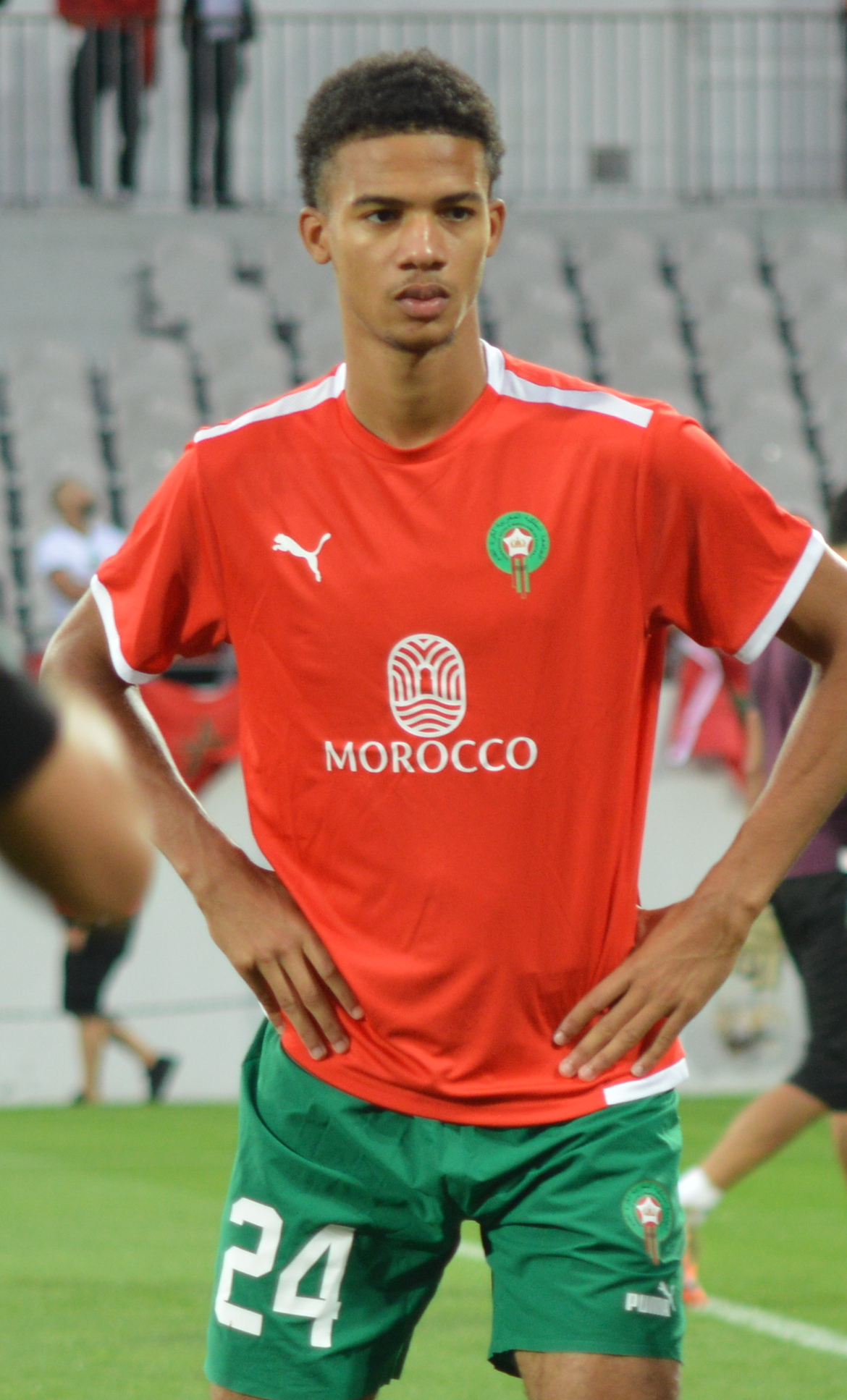
- Richardson with Morocco in 2023

Personal information
- Full name: Michael Amir Richardson
- Date of birth: 24 January 2002 (age 24)
- Place of birth: Nice, France
- Height: 1.97 m (6 ft 6 in)
- Position: Midfielder

Team information
- Current team: Le Havre (on loan from Fiorentina)
- Number: 7

Youth career
- 2008–2012: AS Fontonne Antibes
- 2012–2019: Nice
- 2019–2021: Le Havre

Senior career*
Years	Team	Apps	(Gls)
2021–2023	Le Havre	68	(3)
2023–2024	Reims	28	(3)
2024–	Fiorentina	29	(1)
2026	→ Copenhagen (loan)	4	(0)
2026–	→ Le Havre (loan)	7	(0)

International career^{‡}
2021	France U20	6	(0)
2023–2024	Morocco U23	14	(2)
2023–	Morocco	9	(0)
Medal record
Representing Morocco
U-23 Africa Cup of Nations
Winner	2023 Morocco
Olympic Games
Bronze medal – third place	2024 Paris	Team
- * Club domestic league appearances and goals as of 18 October 2026 ‡ National team caps and goals as of 20:01, 9 September 2024 (UTC)

Michael Amir Junior Richardson (Arabic: مايكل أمير جونيور ريتشاردسون; born 24 January 2002) is a professional footballer who plays as a midfielder for Ligue 1 club Le Havre, on loan from Serie A club Fiorentina. Born in France, he represents the Morocco national team.

== Club career ==
=== Le Havre ===
Richardson came through the ranks of the OGC Nice youth system, before joining Le Havre AC.

He made his professional debut for on 15 May 2021, starting the Ligue 2 game against the league champions ESTAC Troyes. On 9 July 2021, he signed his first professional contract with Le Havre. He was named Ligue 2's Pépite du mois ("Nugget of the Month") for December 2021 and was considered by many sources to have been one of the revelations of the 2021–22 season.

=== Reims ===
On 1 September 2022, he transferred to Reims signing a contract until 2026. He returned to Le Havre on loan for the 2022–23 season where he was part of the team that won the Ligue 2 championship and named in the UNFP Team of the Year.

Richardson made his Ligue 1 debut for Reims in a 2–1 loss to Olympique Marseille at the Stade Vélodrome on 12 August 2023. He scored his first goal in Ligue 1 in a 2–1 loss to Stade Brestois on 17 September 2023.

=== Fiorentina ===
On 12 August 2024, Richardson joined Serie A club Fiorentina.

On 22 January 2026, Richardson moved to Danish club Copenhagen on loan, with an option to buy.

On 18 July 2026, Richardson returned to Le Havre on loan for the 2026–27 season.

== International career ==
Richardson is the son of the American former basketball player Micheal Ray Richardson and a Moroccan mother, Ilham Ngadi, born in Fez, Morocco. He played for the France U20s in 2021. He was called up to the Morocco U23s in March 2023. Born in France, Richardson is eligible to represent any of France, Morocco, or the United States at international level.

In June 2023, he was included in the final squad of the Moroccan under-23 national team for the 2023 U-23 Africa Cup of Nations, hosted on home soil, where the Atlas Lions won their first title and qualified for the 2024 Summer Olympics.

In May 2023, Richardson was approached by the United States Soccer Federation, to see if the player would be willing to change his allegiance to the United States national team. He ultimately turned them down.

In September 2023, Richardson made his senior debut for the Morocco national team, in a 1–0 winning effort against Burkina Faso. Richardson was included in the official Morocco 2023 Africa Cup of Nations squad.

== Personal life ==
He is the son of former NBA player Micheal Ray Richardson (1955–2025), who had moved to France to continue his basketball career.

== Career statistics ==
=== Club ===
As of match played 18 October 2026

Appearances and goals by club, season and competitionClub statistics
Club	Season	League			National cup (Note: Includes Coupe de France, Coppa Italia)		Europe		Other		Total	
Club	Season	Division	Apps	Goals	Apps	Goals	Apps	Goals	Apps	Goals	Apps	Goals
Le Havre	2020–21	Ligue 2	1	0	0	0	—		—		1	0
Le Havre	2021–22	Ligue 2	33	0	1	0	—		—		34	0
Le Havre	2022–23	Ligue 2	34	3	0	0	—		—		34	3
Le Havre	Total		68	3	1	0	—		—		69	3
Reims	2023–24	Ligue 1	28	3	0	0	—		—		28	3
Fiorentina	2024–25	Serie A	27	1	1	0	11 (Note: Appearances in UEFA Conference League)	1	—		39	2
Fiorentina	2025–26	Serie A	2	0	—		2	0	—		4	0
Fiorentina	Total		29	1	1	0	13	1	—		43	2
Copenhagen (loan)	2025–26	Danish Superliga	4	0	1	0	—		—		5	0
Le Havre (loan)	2026–27	Ligue 1	7	0	0	0	—		—		7	0
Career total			136	7	3	0	13	1	0	0	152	8

=== International ===
As of match played 9 September 2024

Appearances and goals by national team and year
National team	Year	Apps	Goals
Morocco	2023	3	0
Morocco	2024	6	0
Total		9	0

== Honours ==
Le Havre

- Ligue 2: 2022–23

France U20

- Maurice Revello Tournament: 2022

Morocco U23

- U-23 Africa Cup of Nations: 2023
- Olympic Bronze Medal: 2024

Individual

- UNFP Ligue 2 Team of the Year: 2022–23
