= Étienne Youté Kinkoué =

French footballer (born 2002)

Personal information
- Full name: Étienne Ludovic Youté Kinkoué
- Date of birth: 14 January 2002 (age 24)
- Place of birth: Lyon, France
- Height: 1.96 m (6 ft 5 in)
- Position: Centre-back

Team information
- Current team: Lausanne-Sport
- Number: 4

Youth career
- 2008–2010: FC Trainel
- 2010–2014: FC Nogentais
- 2014–2019: Troyes
- 2019–2021: Inter Milan

Senior career*
Years	Team	Apps	(Gls)
2021–2023	Olympiacos B	23	(0)
2023–2026	Le Havre	64	(0)
2026–	Lausanne-Sport	2	(0)

International career^{‡}
2018–2019	France U17	8	(1)
2024	France U21	1	(0)
Medal record
Men's football
Representing France
UEFA European Under-17 Championship
Bronze medal – third place	2019 Ireland
- * Club domestic league appearances and goals as of 20 September 2026 ‡ National team caps and goals as of 15 November 2024

Étienne Ludovic Youté Kinkoué (born 14 January 2002) is a French professional footballer who plays as a centre-back for Swiss Super League club Lausanne-Sport.

== Club career ==
In 2019, Kinkoué joined the youth academy of Italian Serie A side Inter Milan from the youth academy of Troyes in the French second division. In 2021, he signed for Greek second division club Olympiacos B and debuted for Olympiacos B on 20 November during a 1–0 win over AEL (Larissa).

On 11 January 2023, Kinkoué signed for Le Havre, then a Ligue 2 club, on a three-year contract.

On 3 September 2026, Kinkoué moved to Switzerland and joined Lausanne-Sport on a three-season deal.

== International career ==
Born in France, Kinkoué is of Cameroonian descent. He is a youth international for France, having played for the France U17s.

== Career statistics ==
As of match played 17 May 2026

Appearances and goals by club, season and competition
Club	Season	League			National Cup		Europe		Other		Total	
Club	Season	Division	Apps	Goals	Apps	Goals	Apps	Goals	Apps	Goals	Apps	Goals
Olympiacos B	2021–22	Super League Greece 2	19	0	—		—		—		19	0
Olympiacos B	2022–23	Super League Greece 2	4	0	—		—		—		4	0
Olympiacos B	Total		23	0	—		—		—		23	0
Le Havre	2022–23	Ligue 1	5	0	0	0	—		—		5	0
Le Havre	2023–24	Ligue 1	22	0	2	0	—		—		24	0
Le Havre	2024–25	Ligue 1	28	0	0	0	—		—		28	0
Le Havre	2025–26	Ligue 1	9	0	0	0	—		—		9	0
Le Havre	Total		64	0	2	0	—		—		66	0
Career total			87	0	2	0	0	0	0	0	89	0
