= Yanis Zouaoui =

French footballer (born 1998)

Personal information
- Date of birth: 26 April 1998 (age 28)
- Place of birth: Marseille, France
- Height: 1.71 m (5 ft 7 in)
- Position: Defender

Team information
- Current team: Montpellier
- Number: 28

Youth career
- Marignane Gignac Côte Bleue

Senior career*
| Years | Team | Apps | (Gls) |
| 2017–2018 | Martigues | 18 | (1) |
| 2018–2020 | Toulon | 41 | (2) |
| 2020–2021 | Foresta Suceava | 2 | (0) |
| 2021–2024 | Martigues | 82 | (7) |
| 2024–2026 | Le Havre | 48 | (1) |
| 2026– | Montpellier | 0 | (0) |
- * Club domestic league appearances and goals as of 5 September 2026

Yanis Zouaoui (born 26 April 1998) is a French footballer who plays as a defender for Ligue 2 club Montpellier.

== Early life ==
Zouaoui was born in 1998 in France. He studied economics and social science. He is of Algerian descent.

== Career ==
In 2021, Zouaoui signed for French side Martigues. In 2024, he signed for French Ligue 1 side Le Havre.

== Style of play ==
Zouaoui mainly operates as a defender. He has been described as "established himself as a solid defender who also makes his contribution in attack".

== Career statistics ==
As of match played 23 August 2026

Appearances and goals by club, season and competition
| Club | Season | League | | | National Cup | | Other | | Total | |
| Club | Season | Division | Apps | Goals | Apps | Goals | Apps | Goals | Apps | Goals |
|---|---|---|---|---|---|---|---|---|---|---|
| Martigues | 2017–18 | CFA 2 | 18 | 1 | — | | — | | 18 | 1 |
| Toulon | 2018–19 | CFA 2 | 23 | 0 | 1 | 0 | — | | 24 | 0 |
| Toulon | 2019–20 | CFA | 18 | 2 | — | | — | | 18 | 2 |
| Toulon | Total | | 41 | 2 | 1 | 0 | — | | 42 | 2 |
| Martigues | 2021–22 | CFA 2 | 25 | 3 | 1 | 0 | — | | 26 | 3 |
| Martigues | 2022–23 | CFA | 30 | 2 | 0 | 0 | — | | 30 | 2 |
| Martigues | 2023–24 | CFA | 27 | 2 | 1 | 0 | — | | 28 | 2 |
| Martigues | Total | | 82 | 7 | 2 | 0 | — | | 84 | 7 |
| Le Havre | 2024–25 | Ligue 1 | 17 | 0 | 1 | 0 | — | | 18 | 0 |
| Le Havre | 2025–26 | Ligue 1 | 30 | 1 | 0 | 0 | — | | 30 | 1 |
| Le Havre | 2026–27 | Ligue 1 | 1 | 0 | 0 | 0 | — | | 1 | 0 |
| Le Havre | Total | | 48 | 1 | 1 | 0 | — | | 49 | 1 |
| Career total | | | 189 | 11 | 4 | 0 | 0 | 0 | 193 | 11 |
