= Steve Ngoura =

French footballer (born 2005)

Personal information
- Date of birth: 22 February 2005 (age 21)
- Place of birth: Ivry-sur-Seine, France
- Height: 1.85 m (6 ft 1 in)
- Position: Forward

Team information
- Current team: Cercle Brugge
- Number: 9

Youth career
- 2014–2017: ES Vitry
- 2017–2019: Choisy-le-Roi
- 2019–2022: Le Havre

Senior career*
Years	Team	Apps	(Gls)
2022–2024	Le Havre B	33	(8)
2022–2025	Le Havre	21	(0)
2025–	Cercle Brugge	42	(7)

International career^{‡}
2021	France U17	4	(0)
2023–2024	France U19	11	(5)
2024–2025	France U20	14	(12)
2026–	France U21	2	(1)
Medal record
Men's football
Representing France
UEFA European Under-19 Championship
Runner-up	2024 Northern Ireland
- * Club domestic league appearances and goals as of 11 May 2026 ‡ National team caps and goals as of 30 March 2026

Steve Ngoura (born 22 February 2005) is a French professional footballer who plays as a forward for Belgian Pro League club Cercle Brugge.

== Early life ==
Born in Ivry-sur-Seine, Val-de-Marne, Ngoura grew up in Vitry, where he first played football, before joining the Le Havre Academy, after a two-year spell at Choisy-le-Roi.

== Club career ==
Steve Ngoura quickly rose as a great prospect of the Normand academy, starting to play with the National 3 reserve during the 2021–22 season, after being a standout player in the Coupe Gambardella. His team reached the round of 16 in the youth competition, as Ngoura scored the only goal of the game against PSG, that knocked out a team including the likes of Warren Zaïre-Emery and Ismaël Gharbi.

Ngoura made his professional debut as a 17-year-old for Le Havre in a Ligue 2 match against Valenciennes on 6 August 2022, coming on as substitute in the final five minutes of a 1–0 away defeat. It was his only appearance during Le Havre's Ligue 2 title winning season. His next first-team appearance came almost 18 months later on 7 January 2024, replacing Daler Kuzyayev during a 2–1 at home in Coupe de France win to Caen.

On 3 January 2025, Ngoura signed for Belgian Pro League club Cercle Brugge for a fee of €3 million.

== International career ==
Ngoura was selected for the France squad for the 2024 UEFA European Under-19 Championship played in Northern Ireland. He came on in the second half of a 2–0 defeat to Spain in the final.

== Personal life ==
Born in France, Ngoura is of Cameroonian descent.

== Career statistics ==
As of match played 15 December 2024

Appearances and goals by club, season and competition
Club	Season	League			Cup		Other		Total	
Club	Season	Division	Apps	Goals	Apps	Goals	Apps	Goals	Apps	Goals
Le Havre B	2021–22	National 3	6	1	—		—		6	1
Le Havre B	2022–23	National 3	15	3	—		—		15	3
Le Havre B	2023–24	National 3	12	4	—		—		12	4
Le Havre B	Total		33	8	—		—		33	8
Le Havre	2022–23	Ligue 2	1	0	0	0	—		1	0
Le Havre	2023–24	Ligue 1	12	0	3	1	—		15	1
Le Havre	2024–25	Ligue 1	8	0	0	0	—		8	0
Le Havre	Total		21	0	3	1	—		24	1
Cercle Brugge	2024–25	Belgian Pro League	0	0	0	0	0	0	0	0
Career total			54	8	3	1	0	0	57	9

== Honours ==
France U19

- UEFA European Under-19 Championship runner-up: 2024

France U20

- Maurice Revello Tournament: 2025
