= 2024–25 Le Havre AC season =

Le Havre AC
2024–25 season
- Head coach: Didier Digard
- Stadium: Stade Océane
- Ligue 1: 15th
- Coupe de France: Round of 64
- Top goalscorer: League: Abdoulaye Touré (10); All: Abdoulaye Touré (10)
- Average home league attendance: 20,218
Home colours	Away colours	Third colours

The 2024–25 season was the 131st season in the history of Le Havre AC, and the club's second consecutive season in Ligue 1. In addition to the domestic league, the club participated in the Coupe de France.

== Players ==
=== First-team squad ===
As of 11 February 2025

No.	Pos.	Nation	Player
1	GK	FRA	Mathieu Gorgelin
3	DF	FRA	Timothée Pembélé (on loan from Sunderland)
4	DF	FRA	Gautier Lloris
6	DF	FRA	Étienne Youte Kinkoue
7	DF	HUN	Loïc Négo
8	MF	MAR	Yassine Kechta
9	FW	COD	Yann Kitala
10	FW	GLP	Josué Casimir (vice-captain)
14	MF	RUS	Daler Kuzyayev
17	DF	MAR	Oualid El Hajjam
18	DF	FRA	Yanis Zouaoui
19	MF	SEN	Rassoul Ndiaye
20	FW	FRA	Élysée Logbo

No.	Pos.	Nation	Player
21	FW	FRA	Antoine Joujou (on loan from Parma)
23	MF	FRA	Junior Mwanga (on loan from Strasbourg)
25	MF	FRA	Alois Confais
28	FW	GHA	André Ayew
30	GK	FRA	Arthur Desmas
34	MF	FRA	Mahamadou Diawara (on loan from Lyon)
44	MF	FRA	Ismail Bouneb
45	DF	SEN	Issa Soumaré
70	MF	SUI	Ruben Londja
93	DF	SEN	Arouna Sangante (captain)
94	MF	GUI	Abdoulaye Touré
97	DF	SEN	Fodé Ballo-Touré
99	FW	EGY	Ahmed Hassan

=== Out on loan ===
Note: Flags indicate national team as defined under FIFA eligibility rules; some limited exceptions apply. Players may hold more than one non-FIFA nationality.

No. / Pos. / Nation / Player; — / GK / FRA / Paul Argney (at Francs Borains until 30 June 2025)	No. / Pos. / Nation / Player; — / DF / GUI / Kandet Diawara (at Pau until 30 June 2025)

== Transfers ==
=== In ===
Pos.	Player	Transferred from	Fee	Date	Source
MF	(France) Ismail Bouneb	(France) Valenciennes U19	Free	3 July 2024	
FW	(Switzerland) Ruben Londja	(Switzerland) FC Lausanne-Sport II	Free	5 July 2024	
DF	(France) Yanis Zouaoui	(France) Martigues	Free	5 July 2024	
FW	(Morocco) Ilyes Housni	(France) Paris Saint-Germain	Loan	28 August 2024	
FW	(France) Antoine Joujou	(Italy) Parma	Loan	29 August 2024	
DF	(France) Timothée Pembélé	(England) Sunderland	Loan	30 August 2024	
FW	(Ghana) André Ayew	Unattached	Free	4 October 2024	

=== Out ===
Pos.	Player	Transferred to	Fee	Date	Source
FW	(Ghana) André Ayew		End of contract	1 July 2024	
GK	(Ivory Coast) Mohamed Koné	(Belgium) Sporting de Charleroi	Undisclosed	2 July 2024	
MF	(France) Mokrane Bentoumi	(France) Villefranche Beaujolais	Loan	14 August 2024	
MF	(Guinea) Kandet Diawara	(France) FC Pau	Loan	26 August 2024	
MF	(Morocco) Nassim Chadli	(Morocco) Wydad AC	Undisclosed	27 August 2024	
FW	(France) Antoine Joujou	(Italy) Parma	Undisclosed	28 August 2024	

== Friendlies ==
=== Pre-season ===
20 July 2024 Friendly	Le Havre	7–0	US Fougères
16:30

24 July 2024 Friendly	Clermont	1–1	Le Havre
17:30

27 July 2024 Friendly	Caen	v	Le Havre

27 July 2024 Friendly	Le Havre	0–1	Lorient
16:00
Note: Two periods of 30 minutes

27 July 2024 Friendly	Le Havre	3–0	Guingamp
17:15
Note: Two periods of 30 minutes

31 July 2024 Friendly	AZ Alkmaar	1–1	Le Havre	Alkmaar, Netherlands
19:00				Stadium: AFAS Stadion

2 August 2024 Friendly	Le Havre	v	Almere City

2 August 2024 Friendly	NEC Nijmegen	1–1	Le Havre

10 August 2024 Friendly	Le Havre	0–6	VfL Bochum
18:00

== Competitions ==
=== Overall record ===
Competition	First match	Last match	Starting round	Final position	Record							
Competition	First match	Last match	Starting round	Final position	Pld	W	D	L	GF	GA	GD	Win %
Ligue 1	16 August 2024	17 May 2025	Matchday 1	15th	34	10	4	20	40	71	−31	29.41
Coupe de France	21 December 2024		Round of 64	Round of 64	1	0	0	1	0	1	−1	0.00
Total					35	10	4	21	40	72	−32	28.57

Source: Soccerway

=== Ligue 1 ===
==== League table ====
Pos	Team	Pld	W	D	L	GF	GA	GD	Pts	Qualification or relegation
13	Nantes	34	8	12	14	39	52	−13	36	
14	Angers	34	10	6	18	32	53	−21	36	
15	Le Havre	34	10	4	20	40	71	−31	34	
16	Reims (R)	34	8	9	17	33	47	−14	33	Qualification for the relegation play-offs
17	Saint-Étienne (R)	34	8	6	20	39	77	−38	30	Relegation to Ligue 2

Source: Ligue 1
Rules for classification: 1) Points; 2) Goal difference; 3) Head-to-head points; 4) Head-to-head goal difference; 5) Head-to-head goals scored; 6) Head-to-head away goals scored; 7) Goals scored; 8) Away goals scored; 9) Fair-play points (Note: Head-to-head record is used only after all the matches between the teams in question have been played).
(R) Relegated

==== Results summary ====
Overall								Home						Away					
Pld	W	D	L	GF	GA	GD	Pts	W	D	L	GF	GA	GD	W	D	L	GF	GA	GD
34	10	4	20	40	71	−31	34	3	2	12	15	41	−26	7	2	8	25	30	−5

Source: Ligue 1

==== Results by round ====
Round	1	2	3	4	5	6	7	8	9	10	11	12	13	14	15	16	17	18	19	20	21	22	23	24	25	26	27	28	29	30	31	32	33	34
Ground	H	A	H	A	A	H	A	H	A	H	H	A	H	A	H	A	H	A	H	A	A	H	H	A	H	A	H	A	H	A	H	A	H	A
Result	L	W	W	L	L	L	L	L	L	W	L	W	L	L	L	L	L	D	L	D	W	L	L	W	D	L	W	W	L	L	D	W	L	W
Position	16	9	7	9	12	14	15	16	17	17	17	14	16	17	17	17	17	17	18	18	17	17	17	16	16	17	16	15	16	16	16	16	16	15

Source: Ligue 1
A = Away; H = Home; W = Win; D = Draw; L = Loss

==== Matches ====
The league schedule was released on 21 June 2024.

Fixture Win Draw Loss

16 August 2024 1	Le Havre	1–4	Paris Saint-Germain	Le Havre
20:45 CEST (UTC+2)	Kinkoue (yellow card) 15'; Joujou (yellow card) 45+3'; Lloris 48', (yellow card) 88'	Report	Lee 3'; Dembélé 85'; Barcola 86'; Kolo Muani 90' (pen.)	Stadium: Stade Océane; Attendance: 23,167; Referee: Willy Delajod

24 August 2024 2	Saint-Étienne	0–2	Le Havre	Saint-Étienne
21:00 CEST (UTC+2)	Nzuzi (yellow card) 33'; Cafaro (yellow card) 40'; Larsonneur (yellow card) 57'	Report	Sangante (yellow card) 40', (goal) 67'; Casimir (yellow card) 42'; Touré 57' (pen.); Ndiaye (yellow card) 90'	Stadium: Stade Geoffroy-Guichard; Attendance: 16,958; Referee: Florent Batta

1 September 2024 3	Le Havre	3–1	Auxerre	Le Havre
17:00	Owusu 23' (o.g.); Ndiaye 52'; Casimir (yellow card) 81'; Touré 90+8'	Report	Joly (yellow card) 11'; Hoever (yellow card) 14' (yellow-red card) 45'; Perrin 17'; Sinayoko 28'; Jubal (yellow card) 89'	Stadium: Stade Océane; Attendance: 19,715; Referee: Marc Bollengier

15 September 2024 4	Toulouse	2–0	Le Havre	Toulouse
17:00	King (yellow card) 53'; Babicka 70'; Gboho 86'	Report	Sangante (yellow card) 57'	Stadium: Stadium de Toulouse; Attendance: 30,097; Referee: Éric Wattellier

22 September 2024 5	Monaco	3–1	Le Havre	Monaco
15:00 CEST (UTC+2)	Teze 9'; Magassa (yellow card) 21'; Ben Seghir 66'; Balogun 70'	Report	Touré (yellow card) 20'; Kuzyayev 30', (yellow card) 65'; Salmier (yellow card) 44'	Stadium: Stade Louis II; Attendance: 6,353; Referee: Stéphanie Frappart

29 September 2024 6	Le Havre	0–3	Lille	Le Havre
21:00	Kechta (yellow card) 44'; Desmas (yellow card) 90+4'	Report	David 23', 35', 79'; André (yellow card) 68'; Ang. Gomes (penalty missed) 90+5'	Stadium: Stade Océane; Attendance: 21,369; Referee: Bastien Dechepy

6 October 2024 7	Brest	2–0	Le Havre	Brest
17:00	Ajorque 12'; Haïdara (yellow card) 17' (yellow-red card) 73'; Ndiaye (yellow card) 25'; Lees-Melou (yellow card) 79'; Salah 90+2'	Report	Youte Kinkoue (red card) 48'	Stadium: Stade Francis-Le Blé; Attendance: 14,572; Referee: Benoît Millot

20 October 2024 8	Le Havre	0–4	Lyon	Le Havre
15:00	Négo (yellow card) 6'; Touré (yellow card) 18'; Casimir (yellow card) 36'	Report	Abner 32'; Cherki (yellow card) 35'; Caqueret (yellow card) 36'; Tolisso (yellow card) 47'; Fofana 57'; Lacazette 71'; Nuamah (yellow card) 78'; Benrahma 87'	Stadium: Stade Océane; Attendance: 22,490; Referee: Abdelatif Kherradji

25 October 2024 9	Rennes	1–0	Le Havre	Rennes
20:45	Seidu (yellow card) 32'; Gómez 54'; Grønbæk (yellow card) 66'	Report	Salmier (yellow card) 35'; Youte Kinkoue (yellow card) 89'; Operi (yellow card) 90+5' (yellow-red card) 90+5'	Stadium: Roazhon Park; Attendance: 27,130; Referee: Florent Batta

3 November 2024 10	Le Havre	1–0	Montpellier	Le Havre
17:00	Lloris (yellow card) 31'; Salmier (yellow card) 46'; Touré 73' (pen.)	Report	Ferri (yellow card) 35'	Stadium: Stade Océane; Attendance: 18,703; Referee: Stéphanie Frappart

10 November 2024 11	Le Havre	0–3	Reims	Le Havre
17:00 CET (UTC+1)	Touré (yellow card) 45+1'	Report	Agbadou (yellow card) 2'; Diakité 15' (yellow card) 32'; Nakamura 21'; Akieme (yellow card) 28'; Ito 57'; Okumu (yellow card) 88'	Stadium: Stade Océane; Attendance: 19,256; Referee: Hakim Ben El Hadj

24 November 2024 12	Nantes	0–2	Le Havre	Nantes
17:00 CET (UTC+1)	Duverne (yellow card) 54'; Simon (yellow card) 62'	Report	Casimir 3'; Desmas (yellow card) 72'; Centonze 74' (o.g.)	Stadium: Stade de la Beaujoire; Attendance: 26,936; Referee: Jérôme Brisard

1 December 2024 13	Le Havre	0–1	Angers	Le Havre
17:00 CET (UTC+1)	Kechta (yellow card) 86'; Youte Kinkoue (yellow card) 90+1'	Report	Abdelli 63'	Stadium: Stade Océane; Attendance: 20,018; Referee: Willy Delajod

7 December 2024 14	Nice	2–1	Le Havre	Nice
19:00 CET (UTC+1)	Laborde 55' (pen.); Boudaoui (yellow card) 64'; Bouanani 75'; Ndombele (yellow card) 86'; Guessand (yellow card) 90+5'	Report	Lloris (yellow card) 82' (goal) 90+2'; Pembélé (yellow card) 88'	Stadium: Allianz Riviera; Attendance: 21,248; Referee: François Letexier

15 December 2024 15	Le Havre	0–3	Strasbourg	Le Havre
17:00 CET (UTC+1)		Report	Diarra 28'; Nanasi 32'; Sobol (yellow card) 79'; Andrey Santos 90'	Stadium: Stade Océane; Attendance: 17,071; Referee: Abdelatif Kherradji

5 January 2025 16	Marseille	5–1	Le Havre	Marseille
20:45 CET (UTC+1)	Rongier 25'; Nadir 39', (yellow card) 45+5'; Maupay 43'; Wahi 66'; Garcia 75'	Report	Ayew 85'	Stadium: Stade Vélodrome; Attendance: 64,092; Referee: Thomas Léonard

12 January 2025 17	Le Havre	1–2	Lens	Le Havre
15:00 CET (UTC+1)	Ayew 8', (yellow card) 34'; Youte Kinkoue (yellow card) 62'	Report	Thomasson (yellow card) 13'; Koyalipou 48'; Machado 77'; Koffi (yellow card) 90+3'	Stadium: Stade Océane; Attendance: 19,617; Referee: Clément Turpin

19 January 2025 18	Reims	1–1	Le Havre	Reims
17:15 CET (UTC+1)	Munetsi 26', (yellow card) 76'; Atangana (yellow card) 41'	Report	Sabbi (yellow card) 17'; Sangante 67'; Ndiaye (yellow card) 90+4'	Stadium: Stade Auguste Delaune; Attendance: 11,278; Referee: Mathieu Vernice

26 January 2025 19	Le Havre	0–1	Brest	Le Havre
15:00 CET (UTC+1)	Sangante (yellow card) 1'; Ayew (yellow card) 4'	Report	Camara (yellow card) 7'; Faivre (yellow card) 22'; Ajorque 25', (yellow card) 58'	Stadium: Stade Océane; Attendance: 17,898; Referee: Romain Lissorgue

2 February 2025 20	Angers	1–1	Le Havre	Reims
17:15 CET (UTC+1)	Raolisoa (red card) 10'; Abdelli (yellow card) 25'; Bamba (yellow card) 51'; Hanin 90'	Report	Négo (yellow card) 2'; Sangante (red card) 16'; Casimir (yellow card) 25'; Ayew 73'; Kechta (yellow card) 76'; Lloris (yellow card) 80'	Stadium: Stade Auguste Delaune; Attendance: 11,267; Referee: Jérémie Pignard

8 February 2025 21	Lille	1–2	Le Havre	Villeneuve-d'Ascq
19:00 CET (UTC+1)	Mbappé (yellow card) 61'; Bakker (yellow card) 69'; Akpom 90+7'	Report	Hassan 38'; Soumaré 56'; Zouaoui (yellow card) 67'	Stadium: Stade Pierre-Mauroy; Attendance: 39,515; Referee: Thomas Léonard

16 February 2025 22	Le Havre	1–3	Nice	Le Havre
17:15 CET (UTC+1)	Kechta 28', (yellow card) 53'; Mwanga (yellow card) 45'	Report	Laborde 16'; Kinkoue 18' (o.g.); Bard (yellow card) 34' (yellow-red card) 90+1'; Diop 90+4'	Stadium: Stade Océane; Attendance: 17,739; Referee: Stéphanie Frappart

23 February 2025 23	Le Havre	1–4	Toulouse	Le Havre
17:15 CET (UTC+1)	Soumaré 51'; Mwanga (red card) 59'	Report	Aboukhlal 9'; Sierro 56' (pen.) (yellow card) 73'; Dønnum 63'; Magri 78'; Kamanzi (yellow card) 90+5'	Stadium: Stade Océane; Attendance: 17,200; Referee: François Letexier

1 March 2025 24	Lens	3–4	Le Havre	Lens
19:00 CET (UTC+1)	El Aynaoui 3' (pen.); Aguilar 19', (yellow card) 34'; Sotoca 48'; Saïd (yellow card) 65'; Elia 90+5'	Report	Touré (yellow card) 22'; Soumaré 28'; Ayew 33'; Casimir 62'; Hassan (yellow card) 65', (goal) 90+1' (pen.)	Stadium: Stade Bollaert-Delelis; Attendance: 38,167; Referee: Jérémie Pignard

9 March 2025 25	Le Havre	1–1	Saint-Étienne	Le Havre
17:15 CET (UTC+1)	Lloris (yellow card) 22'; Zouaoui (yellow card) 32'; Touré (penalty missed) 45+1', 45+1'	Report	Stassin 10'; Cardona (yellow card) 45+3'; Moueffek (yellow card) 50'; Fomba (yellow card) 90+4'	Stadium: Stade Océane; Attendance: 22,239; Referee: Clément Turpin

16 March 2025 26	Lyon	4–2	Le Havre	Décines-Charpieu
15:00 CET (UTC+1)	Lacazette 22' (pen.); Matic (yellow card) 37'; Nuamah (yellow card) 55'; Fofana 78'; Mikautadze 82'; Almada 90+6'	Report	Touré 31' (pen.), (yellow card) 84'; Casimir 45+1'; Gorgelin (yellow card) 63'; Négo (yellow card) 66'	Stadium: Parc Olympique Lyonnais; Attendance: 46,492; Referee: Bastien Dechepy

30 March 2025 27	Le Havre	3–2	Nantes	Le Havre
17:15 CET (UTC+1)	Touré 13' (pen.), 27' (pen.); Pembélé (yellow card) 18', (goal) 88'	Report	Sow 23'; Simon 48'; Thomas (yellow card) 64'; Pallois (yellow card) 90+3'	Stadium: Stade Océane; Attendance: 20,426; Referee: Éric Wattelier

6 April 2024 28	Montpellier	0–2	Le Havre	Montpellier
17:15 CET (UTC+1)	Khazri (yellow card) 90+1'; Meïté (red card) 90+6'	Report	Kechta 3'; Touré 33'; Gorgelin (yellow card) 90+1'	Stadium: Stade de la Mosson; Attendance: 10,146; Referee: Benoît Bastien

13 April 2025 29	Le Havre	1–5	Rennes	Le Havre
17:15 CEST (UTC+2)	Sangante (yellow card) 8'; Mwanga 42'; Zouaoui (yellow card) 49'	Report	Matusiwa 1'; Assignon 12', (yellow card) 41'; Kalimuendo 15'; Cissé (yellow card) 29'; Al-Taamari 57'; Gómez 89', (yellow card) 90+3'	Stadium: Stade Océane; Attendance: 21,582; Referee: Willy Delajod

19 April 2025 30	Paris Saint-Germain	2–1	Le Havre	Paris
17:00 CEST (UTC+2)	Doué 8'; Ramos 50'	Report	Soumaré 60'	Stadium: Parc des Princes; Attendance: 47,113; Referee: Mathieu Vernice

26 April 2025 31	Le Havre	1–1	Monaco	Le Havre
19:00 CEST (UTC+2)	Hassan 22', (yellow card) 23'	Report	Biereth 61'	Stadium: Stade Océane; Attendance: 21,340; Referee: Clément Turpin

4 May 2025 32	Auxerre	1–2	Le Havre	Auxerre
15:15 CEST (UTC+2)	Akpa (yellow card) 27'; Sinayoko 62'; Hoever (yellow card) 75'	Report	Jubal 79' (o.g.); Casimir (yellow card) 84'; Sangante 90+2'	Stadium: Stade de l'Abbé-Deschamps; Attendance: 17,194; Referee: Jérémie Pignard

10 May 2025 33	Le Havre	1–3	Marseille	Le Havre
21:00 CEST (UTC+2)	Négo (yellow card) 48'; Soumaré 66'; Pembélé (yellow card) 90+8'	Report	Balerdi (yellow card) 52'; Gouiri 56', 90+9'; Greenwood 85', (yellow card) 87'	Stadium: Stade Océane; Attendance: 23,831; Referee: Willy Delajod

17 May 2025 34	Strasbourg	2–3	Le Havre	Strasbourg
21:00 CEST (UTC+2)	Andrey Santos 20'; Nanasi 53', (yellow card) 83'; Omobamidele (yellow card) 90+5' (yellow-red card) 90+7'; Amo-Ameyaw (yellow card) 90+7'	Report	Touré 43' (pen.), 90+9' (pen.); Casimir 70'; Négo (yellow card) 90+10'	Stadium: Stade de la Meinau; Attendance: 19,280; Referee: Jérôme Brisard

=== Coupe de France ===
21 December 2024 Round of 64	Stade Briochin	1–0	Le Havre	Saint-Brieuc
15:30 CET (UTC+1)	Janno 79'; Beghin (yellow card) 75'; L'Hostis (yellow card) 90'	Report	Négo (yellow card) 37'; Kuzyayev (yellow card) 55'	Stadium: Stade Fred-Aubert; Referee: Guillaume Paradis
