= Aristide Wam =

Cameroonian footballer

Personal information
- Date of birth: 12 February 2002 (age 24)
- Place of birth: Mbanga, Cameroon
- Height: 1.83 m (6 ft 0 in)
- Position: Midfielder

Team information
- Current team: Sarre-Union

Youth career
- 2020–2021: Le Havre

Senior career*
Years	Team	Apps	(Gls)
2020–2023	Le Havre II	29	(1)
2021–2023	Le Havre	6	(0)
2023–	Sarre-Union	26	(0)
- * Club domestic league appearances and goals as of 7 December 2024

Aristide Wam (born 12 February 2002) is a Cameroonian professional footballer who plays as a midfielder for French Championnat National 3 club Sarre-Union.

== Club career ==
He made his professional debut for Le Havre on the 15 May 2021, starting the Ligue 2 game against the league champions of ESTAC Troyes.
