= Victor Lekhal =

Footballer (born 1994)

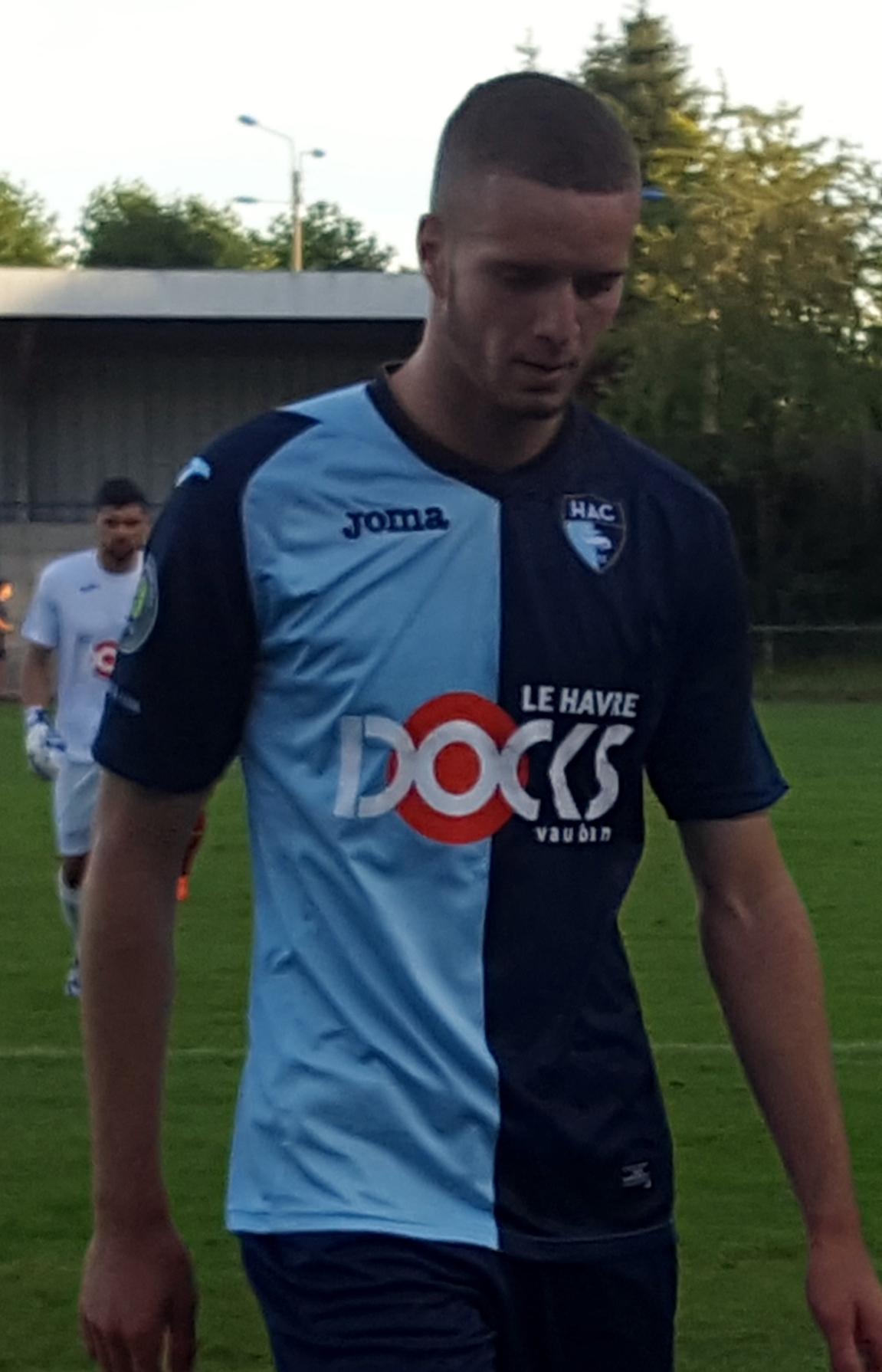
- Lekhal in 2016

Personal information
- Full name: Victor Mehdy Lekhal
- Date of birth: 27 February 1994 (age 32)
- Place of birth: Fécamp, France
- Height: 1.87 m (6 ft 2 in)
- Position: Midfielder

Team information
- Current team: Al-Riyadh
- Number: 27

Senior career*
| Years | Team | Apps | (Gls) |
| 2012–2019 | Le Havre B | 35 | (8) |
| 2014–2023 | Le Havre | 201 | (7) |
| 2015–2016 | → Avranches (loan) | 15 | (1) |
| 2023–2025 | Umm Salal | 37 | (5) |
| 2025–2026 | Al-Qadsia | 12 | (0) |
| 2026– | Al-Riyadh | 1 | (0) |

International career
| 2019- | Algeria | 5 | (0) |
- * Club domestic league appearances and goals as of 5 January 2026, 16:22 (UTC)

Victor Mehdy Lekhal (Arabic: فيكتور مهدي لكحل; born 27 February 1994) is a professional footballer who plays as a midfielder and currently play for Saudi Pro League club Al-Riyadh. Born in France, he earned one cap for the Algeria national team.

== Early life ==
Lekhal was born in Fécamp, and his family is originally from Sétif, Algeria. He holds both French and Algerian nationalities.

== Club career ==
In 2015–16, Lekhal was loaned out to US Avranches MSM for a season.

On 3 June 2023, Lekhal was brought his club secure promotion to Ligue 1 from 2023 to 2024 after defeat Dijon FCO narrowly 1-0 and champions of Ligue 2 in 2022–23. Four days later at same month, Lekhal announcement officially joined to Qatar Stars League club, Umm Salal from 2023 to 2024 season after departure from French Ligue 2 club, Le Havre AC from academy to Senior in 11 years.

== International career ==
He made his debut for the Algeria national football team on 26 March 2019 in a friendly against Tunisia, as a starter.

== Honours ==
Le Havre

- Ligue 2: 2022–23

Qadsia

- Kuwait Super Cup: 2025-26

Individual

- UNFP Ligue 2 Team of the Year: 2022–23
