= Ylan Gomes =

French footballer (born 2002)

Personal information
- Date of birth: 22 July 2002 (age 24)
- Place of birth: Gauville-la-Campagne, France
- Height: 1.74 m (5 ft 9 in)
- Position: Forward

Youth career
- 2010–2011: Argenteuil
- 2011–2016: Évreux
- 2016–2018: Le Havre

Senior career*
Years	Team	Apps	(Gls)
2018–2023	Le Havre II	37	(11)
2020–2023	Le Havre	18	(0)
2023	→ Paris 13 Atletico (loan)	10	(2)
2023–2024	Martigues	5	(0)
2024	Nancy II	9	(0)
2024–2025	Châteauroux II	4	(0)
2024–2025	Châteauroux	2	(0)

International career
2018	France U17	2	(0)
- * Club domestic league appearances and goals as of 26 May 2025

Ylan Gomes (born 22 July 2002) is a French professional footballer who plays as a forward.

== Career ==
Gomes made his professional debut with Le Havre in a 3–1 Ligue 2 win over En Avant Guingamp on 12 September 2020.

On 27 January 2023, Gomes was loaned by Paris 13 Atletico.

== Personal life ==
Gomes is the son of Bissau-Guinean footballer Amarildo Gomes, who was developing at Beauvais and Rennes before retiring through a knee injury. He is the brother of the footballer Claudio Gomes.
