= Abdelwahed Wahib =

Moroccan footballer (born 2000)

Personal information
- Date of birth: 27 January 2000 (age 26)
- Place of birth: Casablanca, Morocco
- Height: 1.77 m (5 ft 10 in)
- Position: Left-back

Team information
- Current team: Valenciennes
- Number: 28

Youth career
- –2019: Mohammed VI Academy

Senior career*
Years	Team	Apps	(Gls)
2019–2023	Le Havre B	20	(1)
2021–2023	Le Havre	20	(0)
2023–2025	Concarneau	33	(0)
2025–	Valenciennes	21	(0)

International career
2017	Morocco U17	2	(1)
- * Club domestic league appearances and goals as of 23 June 2026

Abdelwahed Wahib (born 27 January 2000) is a Moroccan professional footballer who plays as a left-back for French Ligue 3 club Valenciennes.

== Career ==
A product of the Mohammed VI Academy, Wahib moved to Le Havre on 18 June 2019. Wahib made his professional debut with Le Havre in a 2–0 Ligue 2 win over Caen on 15 March 2021.

== International career ==
Wahib represented the Morocco U17s for a pair of 2017 Africa U-17 Cup of Nations qualification matches against the Guinea U17s, scoring one goal.
