= Antoine Joujou =

French footballer (born 2003)

Personal information
- Full name: Antoine Joujou
- Date of birth: 12 March 2003 (age 23)
- Place of birth: Mantes-la-Jolie, France
- Height: 1.89 m (6 ft 2 in)
- Position: Winger

Team information
- Current team: Nantes
- Number: 7

Youth career
- 2010–2014: Melun
- 2014–2016: Évry
- 2016–2018: Sénart-Moissy
- 2018–2019: Cesson VSD
- 2019–2020: CS Brétigny

Senior career*
Years	Team	Apps	(Gls)
2020–2023	Le Havre II	22	(8)
2023–2024	Le Havre	42	(1)
2024–2026	Parma	0	(0)
2024–2025	→ Le Havre (loan)	26	(0)
2025–2026	→ Famalicão (loan)	23	(3)
2026–	Nantes	2	(1)

International career
2023–2024	France U20	8	(0)
- * Club domestic league appearances and goals as of 7 September 2026

Antoine Joujou (born 12 March 2003) is a French professional footballer who plays as a winger for Ligue 2 club Nantes.

== Club career ==
Joujou is a youth product of Melun, Évry, Sénart-Moissy, Cesson VSD, and CS Brétigny before moving to the reserves of Le Havre on 10 July 2020. He made his senior and professional debut with Le Havre as a late substitute in a 3–1 Ligue 2 win over Nîmes on 13 January 2023, assisting his side's third goal. On 2 February 2023, he signed his first professional contract with the club until 2026.

On 28 August 2024, Joujou signed for Italian club Parma and was loaned back to Le Havre for the 2024–25 season.

On 28 August 2025, Joujou was loaned to Famalicão in Portugal.

== International career ==
Joujou was called up to the France U20s for the 2023 FIFA U-20 World Cup.

== Personal life ==
Joujou is of Guadeloupean and Malagasy descent.

== Career statistics ==
As of match played 17 May 2025

Appearances and goals by club, season and competition
Club	Season	League			Cup		Other		Total	
Club	Season	Division	Apps	Goals	Apps	Goals	Apps	Goals	Apps	Goals
Le Havre B	2020–21	National 3	1	1	—		—		1	1
Le Havre B	2021–22	National 3	14	4	—		—		14	4
Le Havre B	2022–23	National 3	5	1	—		—		5	1
Le Havre B	2023–24	National 3	2	2	—		—		2	2
Le Havre B	Total		22	8	—		—		22	8
Le Havre	2022–23	Ligue 2	17	1	0	0	—		17	1
Le Havre	2023–24	Ligue 1	23	0	3	1	—		26	1
Le Havre	2024–25	Ligue 1	4	0	0	0	—		4	0
Le Havre	Total		44	1	3	1	—		47	2
Parma	2024–25	Serie A	0	0	0	0	—		0	0
Le Havre (loan)	2024–25	Ligue 1	26	0	1	0	—		27	0
Career total			92	9	4	1	0	0	96	10
