= Nabil Alioui =

French footballer (born 1999)

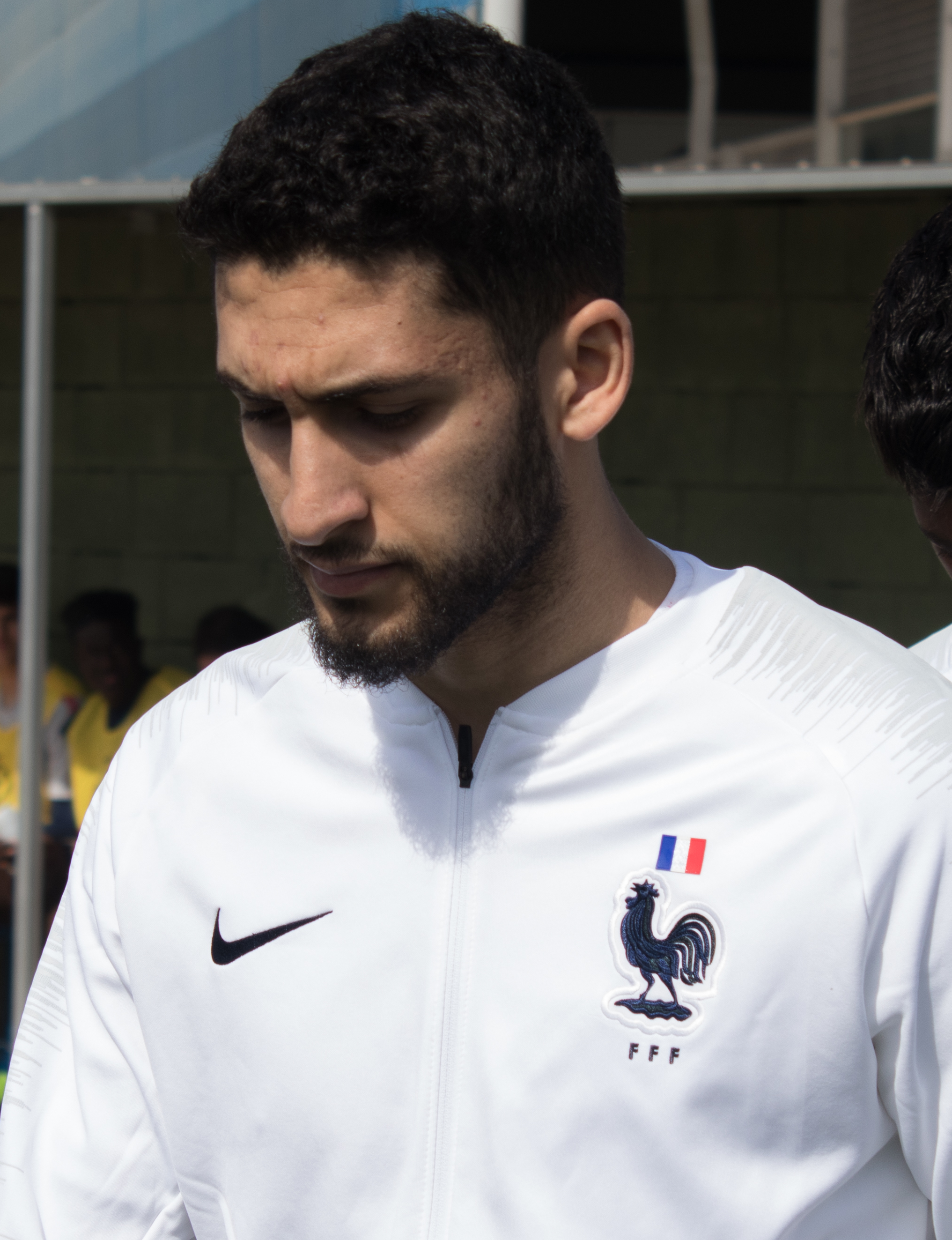
- Alioui playing for France U20 in 2019

Personal information
- Full name: Nabil Alioui
- Date of birth: 18 February 1999 (age 27)
- Place of birth: Toulon, France
- Height: 1.75 m (5 ft 9 in)
- Position: Forward

Team information
- Current team: Damac
- Number: 10

Youth career
- 2006–2008: U.S Ollioulaise
- 2008–2010: Hyères
- 2010–2013: Toulon
- 2013–2017: Monaco

Senior career*
Years	Team	Apps	(Gls)
2017–2020	Monaco B	33	(6)
2018–2020	Monaco	0	(0)
2018–2019	→ Cercle Brugge (loan)	12	(1)
2020–2024	Le Havre	105	(18)
2024–2025	Adana Demirspor	34	(5)
2025–	Damac	0	(0)

International career^{‡}
2014–2015	France U16	10	(1)
2017	France U18	2	(0)
2018	France U19	5	(4)
2019	France U20	9	(3)
- * Club domestic league appearances and goals as of 16 June 2025 ‡ National team caps and goals as of 19 November 2019

Nabil Alioui (born 18 February 1999) is a French professional footballer who plays as a forward for Saudi club Damac.

== Club career ==
On 12 August 2020, Alioui signed a four-year contract with Le Havre.

On 2 February 2024, Alioui moved to Adana Demirspor in Turkey.

On 27 August 2025, Alioui joined Saudi Pro League club Damac.

== International career ==
Born in France, Alioui is of Moroccan descent. He holds French and Moroccan nationalities. Alioui is a youth international for France, and represented the France U19s at the 2018 UEFA European Under-19 Championship.

In December 2023 he was included in Morocco's provisional list for the African Cup of Nations.
