= Quentin Cornette =

French footballer (born 1994)

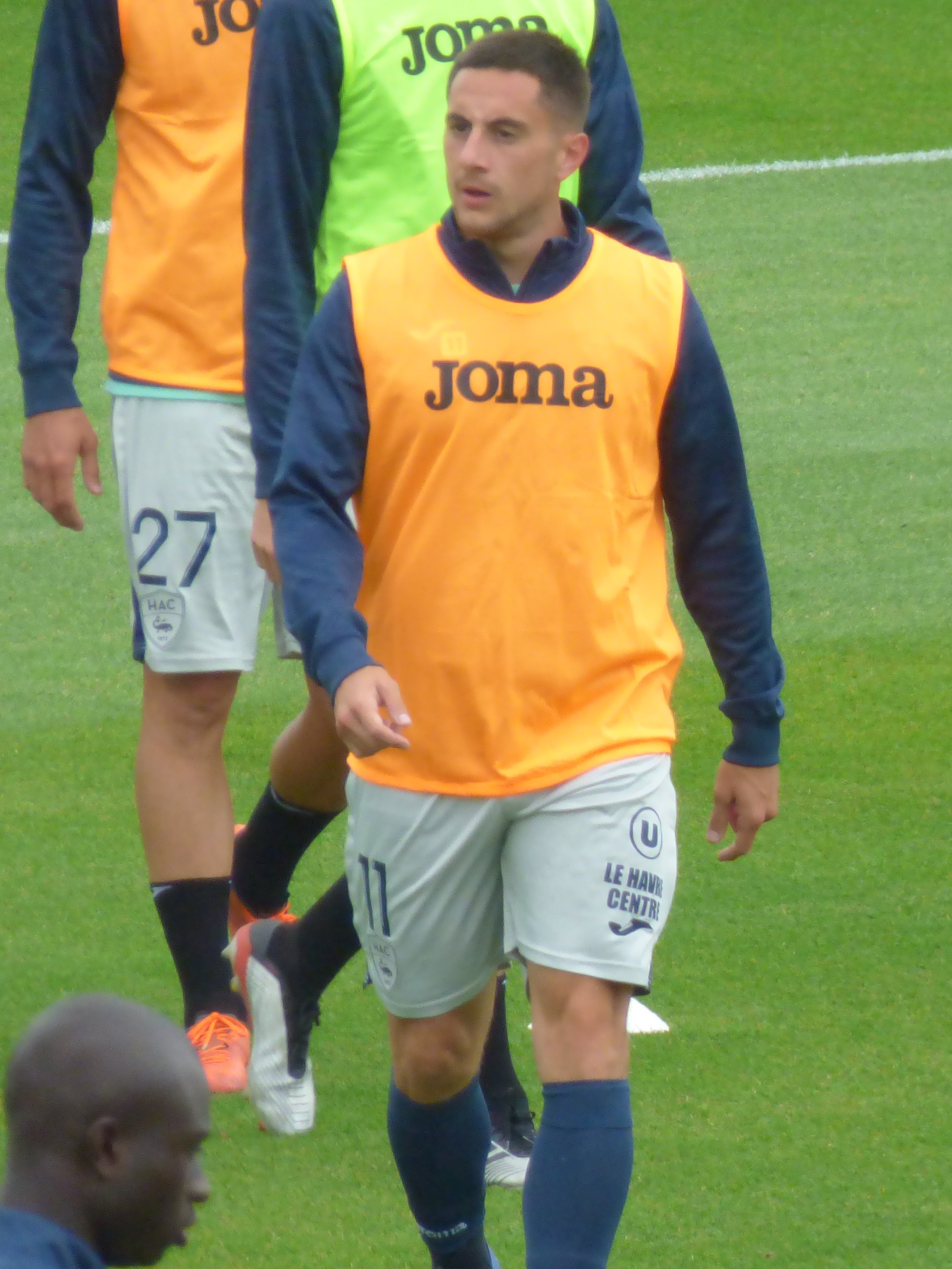
- Quentin Cornette in the RC Lens/Le Havre friendly on July 16, 2020, at the Billy-Montigny Paul-War Stadium.

Personal information
- Date of birth: 17 January 1994 (age 32)
- Place of birth: La Ciotat, France
- Height: 1.72 m (5 ft 8 in)
- Position: Right winger

Team information
- Current team: Nakhon Ratchasima F.C.
- Number: 20

Youth career
- –2015: Montpellier

Senior career*
| Years | Team | Apps | (Gls) |
| 2012–2015 | Montpellier B | 68 | (20) |
| 2015–2016 | Montpellier | 5 | (0) |
| 2016–2020 | Amiens | 33 | (1) |
| 2016–2020 | Amiens B | 10 | (2) |
| 2020–2023 | Le Havre | 94 | (13) |
| 2023–2024 | Volos | 10 | (0) |
| 2024–2025 | Yelimay | 13 | (1) |
| 2026– | Nakhon Ratchasima F.C. | 0 | (0) |
- * Club domestic league appearances and goals as of 7 December 2025

Quentin Cornette (born 17 January 1994) is a French professional footballer who plays as a winger for Thai League 1 club Nakhon Ratchasima F.C.

== Career ==
Cornette is a youth exponent from Montpellier. He made his Ligue 1 debut on 29 August 2015 against Troyes.

Cornette joined Le Havre in the summer of 2020.
