= Stade Océane =

Multi-purpose stadium located in Le Havre

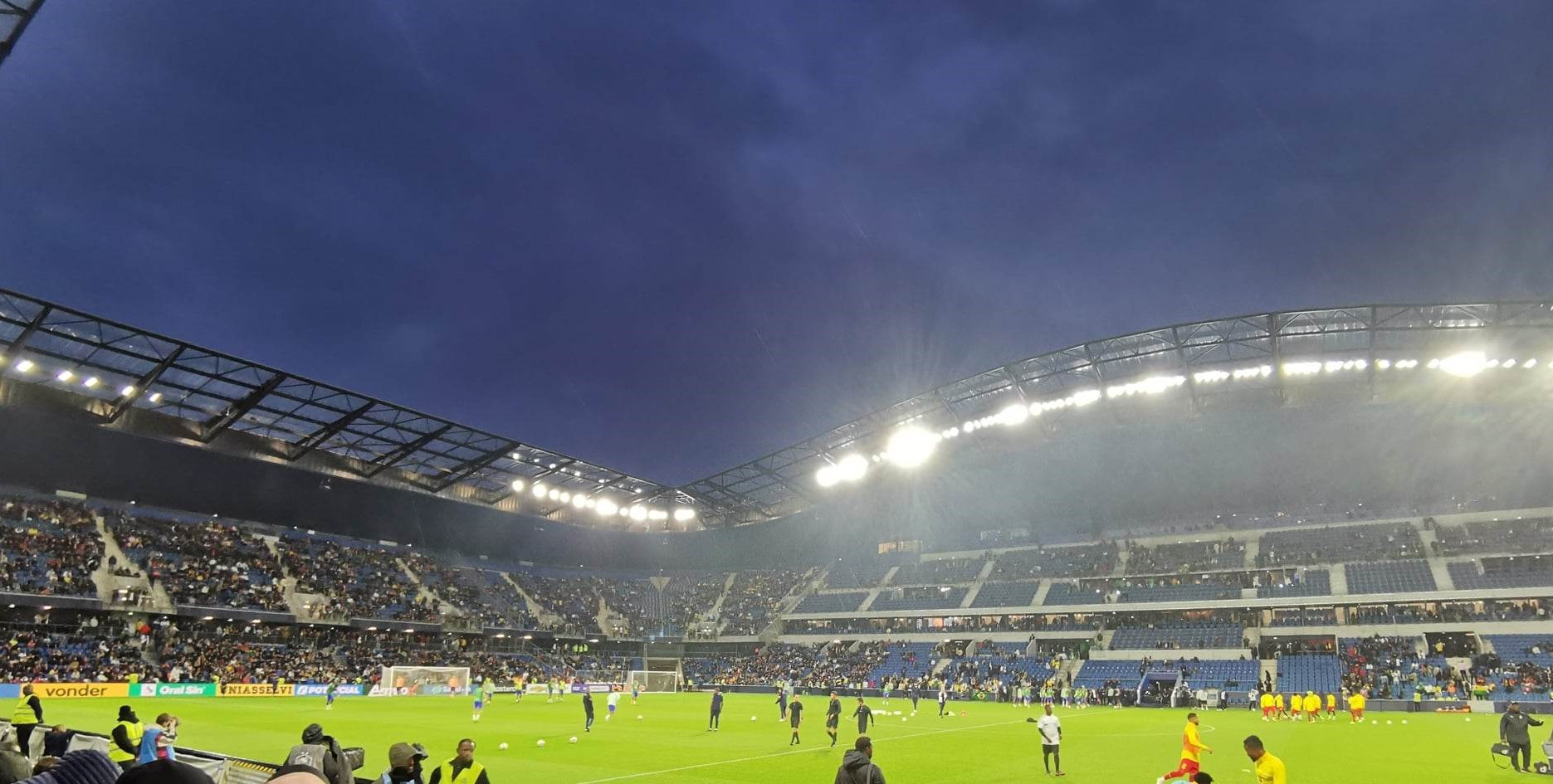
- Interactive map of Stade Océane
- Location: Le Havre, France
- Coordinates: 49°29′56″N 00°10′11″E
- Owner: Agglomeration community of Le Havre
- Capacity: 25,178
- Surface: Desso GrassMaster

Construction
- Groundbreaking: 12 July 2010
- Opened: 12 July 2012
- Cost: €101 million
- Architects: SCAU and KSS Architects

Tenant
- Le Havre AC (2012–present)

Website
- www.stadeoceane.com

The Stade Océane (French pronunciation: [stad ɔsean]; or Grand Stade du Havre and Stade CMA CGM Océane for sponsorship reasons), is a multi-purpose stadium with 25,178 seated places for sports events and 33,000 for shows, located in Le Havre (Seine-Maritime), France.

Mainly used for football, but also equipped with a performance space for artistic events, it hosts the matches of Le Havre AC, a club currently competing in Ligue 1.

It was built on the site of the former Soquence rail yard, which the Le Havre urban community (CODAH) purchased from Réseau Ferré de France in 2008. The site is located on the opposite side of the city from Stade Jules-Deschaseaux. The total cost of the Grand Stade du Havre project amounted to €80 million. It was inaugurated on 12 July 2012, becoming the largest stadium in Normandy with 25,178 seats.

== History ==
Given the limited capacity (16,382 seats) of Stade Jules-Deschaseaux, along with its accessibility issues such as lack of elevators, insufficient parking and general aging condition, a study for a new stadium was launched by Le Havre AC in 2004.

The project was officially approved by the Le Havre urban community (CODAH) in July 2007. On 9 September 2009, Antoine Rufenacht, mayor of Le Havre, and Luc Delamain, architect representing the consortium responsible for the design-build project, presented the stadium project, then called "Le Grand Stade de la CODAH".

The first stone was laid on 11 October 2010 in the presence of Roselyne Bachelot. Construction began but faced some opposition, notably from the association Écologie pour Le Havre, which feared the extinction of the wall lizard species in the city, as they were particularly present around the Soquence rail yard site.

Le Havre AC officially became tenant of the stadium on 22 May 2012. From 16 May to 21 June 2012, residents of the urban area voted among three proposed names. A majority chose the name “Stade Océane,” which was later approved and officially adopted at the community council on 5 July.

The stadium was inaugurated on 12 July 2012 in the presence of the mayor of Le Havre Édouard Philippe, Sports Minister Valérie Fourneyron, and French Football Federation president Noël Le Graët.

The Stade Océane was built on a former enclosed industrial and railway site at the entrance of Le Havre. It helped redevelop a peripheral working-class district. The project is part of the Grenelle de l’Estuaire initiative and aimed to achieve a minimal carbon footprint. It also aimed to improve the city’s image and was part of a broader urban planning strategy.

In June 2026, CMA CGM bought the naming rights to the stadium.

== Structure and Facilities ==
Stadium exterior

The 19-hectare stadium contains 25,178 seated places, making it the largest stadium in Normandy.

It includes:

- 3,053 premium seats
- 340 private box seats across 16 boxes (13 people each)
- A presidential lounge with capacity for 146 people

The stadium is presented as the first positive-energy stadium.

The stadium is 31 meters high. Parking includes approximately 1,270 spaces.

Thanks to 1,500 m² of photovoltaic panels installed on the roof, the stadium is intended to produce more energy than it consumes, although this claim has been disputed due to additional electricity costs recorded by the community authority.

A rainwater collection system and a bio-composter complement the stadium’s ecological systems.

The blue polymer exterior covering spans 32,500 m² and is 0.25 mm thick. The blue color represents Le Havre AC’s colors (sky blue and navy), highlighting the stadium against its surroundings and symbolically referencing water and the sea.

Inside, two 46 m² giant screens provided by Sony are installed. The pitch covers 10,736 m² and uses natural grass reinforced with synthetic fibers. The stadium is designed to provide excellent comfort, visibility, and acoustics, with optimal sightlines and close proximity to the action.

Approximately 300 permanent jobs (including part-time positions) were created to operate the stadium, including security staff, ushers, and catering employees.

== Hotel ==
In September 2018, Le Havre AC announced the opening of a hotel inside the stadium called the “1872 Stadium Hotel.” It includes 20 rooms located directly within the VIP boxes. These rooms use modular beds that can be reconfigured within minutes.

== Use ==
Football

The stadium inauguration match scheduled for 12 July 2012 was originally planned between Le Havre AC and Glasgow Rangers. However, the Scottish club withdrew due to financial difficulties. The match was replaced by a friendly against Lille OSC, which Le Havre lost 2–1. Benoît Pedretti scored the first goal in the stadium.

Club matches

The stadium replaced Stade Jules-Deschaseaux for home matches of Le Havre AC. The first official match at the stadium took place on 27 July 2012 against AC Arles-Avignon, ending in a 2–1 defeat. Yohann Rivière scored the first official goal in the stadium in the 16th minute.

The first official victory came on 17 August 2012 against GFC Ajaccio, a 2–1 win.

Attendance during Ligue 2 matches was significantly below capacity, averaging between 7,000 and 10,000 spectators per match.

The first Ligue 1 match hosted at the Stade Océane featured Amiens vs Bordeaux (1–0) on 21 October 2017, relocated due to an incident at Stade de la Licorne.

On 30 March 2025, the HAC anthem was performed live for the first time inside the stadium by the Le Havre city orchestra, accompanied by trumpeter Ludovic Louis, during the FC Nantes vs Le Havre AC match.

International matches

The stadium hosted a France national team match on 15 August 2012 against Uruguay, the first match of Didier Deschamps as coach. The match ended 0–0.

The stadium has also hosted several women’s and international friendlies.

== Environment & Access ==
The stadium is located on Boulevard de Leningrad (RD 6015).

Access is provided via road and public transport. A northern access ramp connects to RD 6015, and a pedestrian/road passage under the railway creates a north-south axis.

Bus shuttles have been in place since the 2013–2014 season. The stadium is expected to have improved access once tram line C in Le Havre is completed in 2027.

== 2019 FIFA Women's World Cup ==
The stadium was chosen to host matches up to the quarter-finals of the 2019 FIFA Women's World Cup.

Date	Time (CEST)	Team #1	Res.	Team #2	Round	Attendance
8 June 2019	18:00	Spain	3–1	South Africa	Group B	12,044
11 June 2019	15:00	New Zealand	0–1	Netherlands	Group E	10,654
14 June 2019	21:00	England	1–0	Argentina	Group D	20,294
17 June 2019	18:00	China	0–0	Spain	Group B	11,814
20 June 2019	21:00	Sweden	0–2	United States	Group F	22,418
23 June 2019	21:00	France	2–1 (a.e.t.)	Brazil	Round of 16	23,965
27 June 2019	21:00	Norway	0–3	England	Quarter-finals	21,111
