= 2020–21 Le Havre AC season =

Le Havre AC
2020–21 season
- President: Vincent Volpe
- Head coach: Paul Le Guen
- Stadium: Stade Océane
- Ligue 2: 12th
- Coupe de France: Eighth round
| Home colours | Away colours |

The 2020–21 Le Havre AC season was the club's 127th season in existence and its 12th consecutive season in the second flight of French football. In addition to the domestic league, Le Havre participated in this season's edition of the Coupe de France. The season covered the period from 1 July 2020 to 30 June 2021.

== Players ==
=== First-team squad ===
As of 15 February 2021.

Note: Flags indicate national team as defined under FIFA eligibility rules; some limited exceptions apply. Players may hold more than one non-FIFA nationality.

| No. | Pos. | Nation | Player |
|---|---|---|---|
| 1 | GK | FRA | Mathieu Gorgelin |
| 2 | DF | MAR | Abdelwahed Wahib |
| 3 | DF | TUR | Umut Meraş |
| 4 | DF | TUR | Ertuğrul Ersoy |
| 5 | DF | CGO | Fernand Mayembo |
| 6 | MF | FRA | Romain Basque |
| 7 | MF | FRA | Jean-Pascal Fontaine (vice-captain) |
| 8 | MF | FRA | Himad Abdelli |
| 9 | FW | FRA | Nabil Alioui |
| 10 | FW | FRA | Alan Dzabana |
| 11 | FW | FRA | Quentin Cornette |
| 12 | DF | TUN | Ayman Ben Mohamed |
| 13 | FW | MAR | Khalid Boutaïb |
| 14 | FW | SEN | Jamal Thiaré |

| No. | Pos. | Nation | Player |
|---|---|---|---|
| 16 | GK | CAN | Nikola Curcija |
| 17 | MF | FRA | Alexandre Bonnet (captain) |
| 18 | MF | FRA | Nolan Mbemba |
| 19 | DF | BFA | Yacouba Coulibaly |
| 20 | FW | GHA | Godwin Bentil |
| 21 | FW | FRA | Ylan Gomes |
| 22 | MF | ALG | Victor Lekhal |
| 24 | MF | FRA | Mamadou Fofana |
| 26 | DF | FRA | Woyo Coulibaly |
| 27 | DF | FRA | Pierre Gibaud |
| 28 | FW | FRA | Elies Mahmoud |
| 29 | FW | HAI | Hervé Bazile |
| 30 | GK | FRA | Yahia Fofana |
| 36 | DF | FRA | Isaak Touré |

=== Out on loan ===
Note: Flags indicate national team as defined under FIFA eligibility rules; some limited exceptions apply. Players may hold more than one non-FIFA nationality.

| No. / Pos. / Nation / Player; — / DF / BFA / Yacouba Coulibaly (on loan to Paris FC) | No. / Pos. / Nation / Player; — / DF / GLP / Kelly Irep (on loan to Bourg-en-Bresse) |

== Pre-season and friendlies ==
Win Draw Loss

| 12 July 2020 Friendly | Le Havre | 0–9 | Paris Saint-Germain | Le Havre, France |
| 19:00 CEST (UTC+2) | Casimir (yellow card) 27' | Report | Icardi 8', 19'; Neymar 21', 43' (pen.); Mbappé 29'; Gueye 50'; Sarabia 52', 60'; Kalimuendo 59' | Stadium: Stade Océane; Attendance: 5,000; Referee: Mikael Lesage (France) |

| 16 July 2020 Friendly | Lens | 1–3 | Le Havre | Billy-Montigny, France |
| 17:00 CEST (UTC+2) | Sotoca 24' | Report | Thiaré 37'; Meraş 50'; Abdelli 57' | Stadium: Les Carabiniers Billy-Montigny; Referee: Ruddy Buquet (France) |

| 22 July 2020 Friendly | Reims | 3–0 | Le Havre | Le Touquet, France |
| 17:00 CEST (UTC+2) | Sierhuis 18'; Touré 44'; Zeneli 46' (pen.) | Report | | Stadium: Stade Ferdi Petit; Attendance: 300 |

| 28 July 2020 Friendly | Le Havre | 3–1 | Angers | Alençon, France |
| 18:00 CEST (UTC+2) | Cornette 5'; Meraş 48'; Bonnet 66' | Report | Kanga 12' | Stadium: Stade Jacques-Fould; Attendance: 300; Referee: Mikael Lesage (France) |

| 1 August 2020 Friendly | Caen | 1–2 | Le Havre | Caen, France |
| 18:00 CEST (UTC+2) | Tchokounté 14' | Report | Bentil 30'; Fontaine 75' | Stadium: Stade Michel d'Ornano; Attendance: 3,500; Referee: Bartolomeu Varela (France) |

| 5 August 2020 Friendly | Le Havre | 1–1 | Quevilly-Rouen | Le Havre, France |
| 18:00 CEST (UTC+2) | Bentil 90+1' | Report | Rotsen 90' | Stadium: Centre d'entraînement du H.A.C; Attendance: 0 |

| 8 August 2020 Friendly | Guingamp | Cancelled | Le Havre | Guingamp, France |
| 17:00 CEST (UTC+2) | | | | Stadium: Stade de Roudourou |

| 12 August 2020 Friendly | Avranches | 5–4 | Le Havre | Avranches, France |
| 18:00 CEST (UTC+2) | Kouakou 15', 47'; Belliard 33'; Essende 42' (pen.); Magnon 87' | Report | Thiaré 20'; Fontaine 39'; Dzabana 71'; Mahmoud 90' | Stadium: Stade René Fenouillère |

| 15 August 2020 Friendly | Nantes | 3–1 | Le Havre | La Baule, France |
| 16:00 CEST (UTC+2) | Simon 7'; Coulibaly 49'; Ndilu 90+2' | Report | Abdelli 45+2' (pen.) | Stadium: Stade Moreau Défarges; Referee: Jérémy Stinat (France) |

== Competitions ==
=== Overview ===
| Competition | First match | Last match | Starting round | Final position | Record | | | | | | | |
| Competition | First match | Last match | Starting round | Final position | Pld | W | D | L | GF | GA | GD | Win % |
|---|---|---|---|---|---|---|---|---|---|---|---|---|
| Ligue 2 | 24 August 2020 | 15 May 2021 | Matchday 1 | 12th | 38 | 11 | 14 | 13 | 38 | 48 | −10 | 28.95 |
| Coupe de France | 19 January 2021 | | Eighth round | Eighth round | 1 | 0 | 0 | 1 | 0 | 1 | −1 | 0.00 |
| Total | | | | | 39 | 11 | 14 | 14 | 38 | 49 | −11 | 28.21 |

Source: Soccerway

=== Ligue 2 ===
==== League table ====
| Pos | Team | Pld | W | D | L | GF | GA | GD | Pts |
|---|---|---|---|---|---|---|---|---|---|
| 10 | Amiens | 38 | 11 | 14 | 13 | 34 | 40 | −6 | 47 |
| 11 | Valenciennes | 38 | 12 | 11 | 15 | 50 | 59 | −9 | 47 |
| 12 | Le Havre | 38 | 11 | 14 | 13 | 38 | 48 | −10 | 47 |
| 13 | Ajaccio | 38 | 11 | 13 | 14 | 34 | 43 | −9 | 46 |
| 14 | Pau | 38 | 11 | 11 | 16 | 42 | 49 | −7 | 44 |

Source: Ligue 2
Rules for classification: 1) Points; 2) Goal difference; 3) Number of goals scored; 4) Head-to-head goal difference; 5) Fair play points

==== Results summary ====
| Overall | | | | | | | | Home | | | | | | Away | | | | | |
| Pld | W | D | L | GF | GA | GD | Pts | W | D | L | GF | GA | GD | W | D | L | GF | GA | GD |
|---|---|---|---|---|---|---|---|---|---|---|---|---|---|---|---|---|---|---|---|
| 38 | 11 | 14 | 13 | 38 | 48 | −10 | 47 | 4 | 8 | 7 | 16 | 23 | −7 | 7 | 6 | 6 | 22 | 25 | −3 |

Source: Ligue 2

==== Results by round ====
| Round | 1 | 2 | 3 | 4 | 5 | 6 | 7 | 8 | 9 | 10 | 11 | 12 | 13 | 14 | 15 | 16 | 17 | 18 | 19 | 20 | 21 | 22 | 23 | 24 | 25 | 26 | 27 | 28 | 29 | 30 | 31 | 32 | 33 | 34 | 35 | 36 | 37 | 38 |
|---|---|---|---|---|---|---|---|---|---|---|---|---|---|---|---|---|---|---|---|---|---|---|---|---|---|---|---|---|---|---|---|---|---|---|---|---|---|---|
| Ground | A | H | A | H | A | A | H | A | H | A | H | A | H | A | H | A | H | A | H | A | H | A | H | H | A | H | A | H | A | H | A | H | A | H | A | H | A | H |
| Result | L | W | W | L | W | L | D | W | W | L | L | L | D | D | D | L | D | W | L | D | D | D | D | W | W | D | L | L | W | L | D | D | D | L | D | L | W | W |
| Position | 18 | 13 | 10 | 10 | 7 | 13 | 13 | 13 | 13 | 13 | 13 | 13 | 13 | 13 | 13 | 13 | 13 | 13 | 12 | 13 | 13 | 13 | 13 | 13 | 10 | 9 | 10 | 14 | 8 | 13 | 12 | 12 | 12 | 13 | 13 | 14 | 13 | 12 |

Source: Ligue 2
A = Away; H = Home; W = Win; D = Draw; L = Loss

==== Matches ====
The league fixtures were announced on 9 July 2020.

| 24 August 2020 1 | Troyes | 2–0 | Le Havre | Troyes |
| 20:45 CEST (UTC+2) | Salmier (yellow card) 32'; Lumeka 78', 90+1' | Report | Fontaine (yellow card) 3' (yellow-red card) 61'; Ersoy (red card) 53' | Stadium: Stade de l'Aube; Referee: Antony Gautier |

| 29 August 2020 2 | Le Havre | 1–0 | Amiens | Le Havre |
| 19:00 CEST (UTC+2) | Monzango 44' (o.g.) | Report | | Stadium: Stade Océane; Referee: Sylvain Palhies |

| 12 September 2020 3 | Guingamp | 1–3 | Le Havre | Guingamp |
| 15:00 CEST (UTC+2) | Phaeton 73' | Report | Thiaré 6', 45'; Mellot 68' (o.g.) | Stadium: Stade de Roudourou; Referee: Frank Schneider |

| 19 September 2020 4 | Le Havre | 0–1 | Niort | Le Havre |
| 19:00 CEST (UTC+2) | | Report | Kemen 90' | Stadium: Stade Océane; Attendance: 4,377; Referee: Remi Landry |

| 26 September 2020 5 | Nancy | 0–1 | Le Havre | Tomblaine |
| 19:00 CEST (UTC+2) | | Report | Gibaud 66' | Stadium: Stade Marcel Picot; Attendance: 4,191; Referee: Romain Delpech |

| 3 October 2020 6 | Paris FC | 3–0 | Le Havre | Paris |
| 19:00 CEST (UTC+2) | Abdi 33'; López 56' 77' | Report | Gibaud (yellow card) 78' | Stadium: Stade Sébastien Charléty; Attendance: 0 Referee: Oliver Thual |

| 17 October 2020 7 | Le Havre | 1–1 | Châteauroux | Le Havre |
| 19:00 CEST (UTC+2) | Bentil 8' (yellow card) 65'; Ersoy (yellow card) 54' | Report | Sunu 16'; Opa Sanganté (yellow card) 29'; Mulumba (yellow card) 58' | Stadium: Stade Océane; Attendance: 1,000; Referee: Mathieu Vernice |

| 24 October 2020 8 | Dunkerque | 0–1 | Le Havre | Dunkerque |
| 19:00 CEST (UTC+2) | Goteni (yellow card) 40'; Kebbal (yellow card) 70' | Report | Bazile 26'; Basque (yellow card) 70'; Lekhal (yellow card) 74' | Stadium: Stade Marcel-Tribut; Attendance: 0 Referee: Romain Lissorgue |

| 31 October 2020 9 | Le Havre | 1–0 | Pau | Le Havre |
| 19:00 CEST (UTC+2) | Bentil 3'; Cornette (yellow card) 38'; Fontaine (yellow card) 58' | Report | Batisse (yellow card) 50' (yellow-red card) 85'; Scaramozzino (yellow card) 89'; Bayard (yellow card) 90' | Stadium: Stade Océane; Attendance: 0 Referee: Romain Delpech |

| 7 November 2020 10 | Grenoble | 2–1 | Le Havre | Grenoble |
| 15:00 CET (UTC+1) | Tapoko 40'; Gaspar (yellow card) 61'; Semedo 82' | Report | Bentil (yellow card) 43'; Ben Mohamed (yellow card) 55'; Basque (yellow card) 64'; Mbemba 90+4' | Stadium: Stade des Alpes; Referee: Eric Wattellier |

| 21 November 2020 11 | Le Havre | 1–2 | Caen | Le Havre |
| 15:00 (CET) (UTC+1) | Abdelli 45'; Lekhal (yellow card) 52'; Bonnet (yellow card) 84' | Report | Vandermersch (yellow card) 29'; Mendy (yellow card) 68'; Armougom (yellow card) 70'; Court 76'; Bammou 85' (pen.) | Stadium: Stade Océane; Referee: Stéphanie Frappart |

| 28 November 2020 12 | Sochaux | 4–0 | Le Havre | Montbéliard |
| 19:00 CET (UTC+1) | Bedia 9', 15'; Lasme 21' (pen.); Weissbeck 65'; Virginius (yellow card) 84' | Report | | Stadium: Stade Auguste Bonal; Referee: Mehdi Mokhtari |

| 1 December 2020 13 | Le Havre | 1–1 | Auxerre | Le Havre |
| 19:00 CET (UTC+1) | Abdelli (yellow card) 14' (yellow-red card) 65'; Thiaré (yellow card) 34'; Gorgelin (yellow card) 44'; Lloris 49' (o.g.) | Report | Autret 39'; Jubal (yellow card) 52'; Bellugou (yellow card) 56' | Stadium: Stade Océane; Referee: Bartolomeu Varela |

| 7 December 2020 14 | Ajaccio | 1–1 | Le Havre | Ajaccio |
| 19:00 CET (UTC+1) | Laçi (yellow card) 39'; Courtet 65' (pen.), (yellow card) 66'; Avinel (yellow card) 68'; Barreto (yellow card) 84' | Report | Mayembo (yellow card) 4'; Gibaud 40'; Bazile (yellow card) 66', (red card) 66' | Stadium: Stade François Coty; Referee: Jeremie Pignard |

| 14 December 2020 15 | Le Havre | 0–0 | Clermont | Le Havre |
| 20:45 CET (UTC+1) | | Report | | Stadium: Stade Océane; Referee: Olivier Thual |

| 19 December 2020 16 | Toulouse | 4–3 | Le Havre | Toulouse |
| 15:00 CET (UTC+1) | Healey 2', 12', (yellow card) 80'; Adli 31'; Amian (yellow card) 60'; Spierings 90+8' (pen.) | Report | Bonnet 19'; Gibaud (yellow card) 29'; Meraş 50', (yellow card) 90+4'; Basque (yellow card) 56'; Alioui 83' | Stadium: Stadium de Toulouse; Referee: Arnaud Baert |

| 22 December 2020 17 | Le Havre | 1–1 | Rodez | Le Havre |
| 20:00 CET (UTC+1) | Basque 50' | Report | Ouhafsa 80' | Stadium: Stade Océane; Referee: Sylvain Palhies |

| 5 January 2021 18 | Chambly | 0–1 | Le Havre | Beauvais |
| 20:00 CET (UTC+1) | Soubervie (yellow card) 34'; Gonzalez (yellow card) 56' | Report | Meraş (yellow card) 69'; Abdelli 80' (pen.) | Stadium: Stade Pierre Brisson; Referee: Romain Lissorgue |

| 8 January 2021 19 | Le Havre | 0–2 | Valenciennes | Le Havre |
| 20:00 CET (UTC+1) | Ersoy (yellow card) 54'; Ben Mohamed (yellow card) 82'; Mayembo (yellow card) 86' | Report | Güçlü (yellow card) 42'; Picouleau 63'; Guillaume 67' | Stadium: Stade Océane; Referee: Pierre Gaillouste |

| 16 January 2021 20 | Amiens | 0–0 | Le Havre | Amiens |
| 19:00 CET (UTC+1) | | Report | Boutaïb (yellow card) 79' | Stadium: Stade de la Licorne; Referee: Gaël Angoula |

| 23 January 2021 21 | Le Havre | 1–1 | Guingamp | Le Havre |
| 19:00 CET (UTC+1) | Thiaré 59' (pen.); Y. Coulibaly (yellow card) 90+3' | Report | Niakaté (yellow card) 58'; Rodelin 90' | Stadium: Stade Océane; Referee: Mathieu Vernice |

| 30 January 2021 22 | Niort | 0–0 | Le Havre | Niort |
| 20:00 CET (UTC+1) | Passi (yellow card) 26'; Kemen (yellow card) 38' | Report | W. Coulibaly (yellow card) 23'; Gorgelin (red card) 35' | Stadium: Stade René Gaillard; Referee: Benjamin Lepaysant |

| 2 February 2021 23 | Le Havre | 1–1 | Nancy | Le Havre |
| 20:00 CET (UTC+1) | Thiaré (penalty missed) 41'; Alioui (yellow card) 63'; Seka 85' (o.g.); Bonnet (yellow card) 90' | Report | Scheidler (yellow card) 35'; Ciss (yellow card) 38'; Rocha Santos 49'; Haag (yellow card) 86' | Stadium: Stade Océane; Referee: Pierre Gaillouste |

| 6 February 2021 24 | Le Havre | 1–0 | Paris FC | Le Havre |
| 20:00 CET (UTC+1) | Thiaré 28' | Report | Kikonda (yellow card) 48'; Bamba (yellow card) 51' | Stadium: Stade Océane; Referee: Olivier Thual |

| 13 February 2021 25 | Châteauroux | 0–1 | Le Havre | Châteauroux |
| 19:00 CET (UTC+1) | Sidibé (yellow card) 23'; Vargas (yellow card) 66' | Report | Alioui (yellow card) 50'; Lekhal (yellow card) 63'; Bonnet 67' (pen.) | Stadium: Stade Gaston Petit; Referee: Stéphanie Frappart |

| 20 February 2021 26 | Le Havre | 1–1 | Dunkerque | Le Havre |
| 19:00 CET (UTC+1) | Bonnet 83' (pen.) | Report | Cissé (yellow card) 28'; Vialla (yellow card) 45+1'; Tchokounté 46'; Huysman (yellow card) 80' | Stadium: Stade Océane; Referee: Remi Landry |

| 27 February 2021 27 | Pau | 2–0 | Le Havre | Pau |
| 19:00 CET (UTC+1) | Sabaly (yellow card) 55'; George 60', (yellow card) 64'; Beusnard 79' | Report | Boutaïb (yellow card) 16' | Stadium: Stade du Hameau; Referee: Sylvain Palhies |

| 2 March 2021 28 | Le Havre | 0–2 | Grenoble | Le Havre |
| 20:00 CET (UTC+1) | Bonnet (yellow card) 52'; Boutaïb (yellow card) 76'; Lekhal (yellow card) 86' | Report | Semedo 18'; Belmonte 69' | Stadium: Stade Océane; Referee: Mehdi Mokhtari |

| 15 March 2021 29 | Caen | 0–2 | Le Havre | Caen |
| 20:45 (CET) (UTC+1) | Rivierez (yellow card) 26'; Weber (yellow card) 33' | Report | Alioui 5'; Bonnet 70'; Wahib (yellow card) 77'; Mahmoud (yellow card) 90+2' | Stadium: Stade Michel d'Ornano; Referee: Romain Lissorgue |

| 20 March 2021 30 | Le Havre | 0–2 | Sochaux | Le Havre |
| 20:00 CET (UTC+1) | Meraş (yellow card) 43'; Mayembo (yellow card) 90+3' | Report | Ourega 37'; Bedia 77', (yellow card) 90'; Kaabouni (yellow card) 84'; Virginius (yellow card) 90+4' | Stadium: Stade Océane; Referee: Rémi Landry |

| 5 April 2021 31 | Auxerre | 1–1 | Le Havre | Auxerre |
| 20:45 CEST (UTC+1) | Jubal Jr. (yellow card) 37'; Duigmont 39'; Coeff (yellow card) 52'; Autret (yellow card) 56' | Report | Bonnet 53' (pen.) | Stadium: Stade de l'Abbé-Deschamps; Referee: Mathieu Vernice |

| 10 April 2021 32 | Le Havre | 1–1 | Ajaccio | Le Havre |
| 20:00 CET (UTC+1) | Bonnet 33' (pen.), (yellow card) 86'; Alioui (yellow card) 61' | Report | Kalulu (yellow card) 31'; Laçi (yellow card) 31' e=Marchetti (yellow card) 54'; Arconte 74' | Stadium: Stade Océane; Referee: Guillaume Paradis |

| 17 April 2021 33 | Clermont | 1–1 | Le Havre | Clermont-Ferrand |
| 15:00 CEST (UTC+2) | Seidu (red card) 44'; Tell 72'; Samed (yellow card) 77' | Report | Thiaré 18'; W. Coulibaly (yellow card) 36' | Stadium: Stade Gabriel Montpied; Referee: Romain Lissorgue |

| 24 April 2021 35 | Rodez | 1–1 | Le Havre | Rodez |
| 20:00 CEST (UTC+2) | Leborgne 33', (yellow card) 87'; Henry (yellow card) 45+1' | Report | Boutaïb 81' | Stadium: Stade Paul-Lignon; Referee: Arnaud Baert |

| 1 May 2021 36 | Le Havre | 2–4 | Chambly | Le Havre |
| 20:00 CET (UTC+1) | Bonnet (yellow card) 10', (goal) 20' (pen.); Mayembo (yellow card) 40'; Basque (yellow card) 44'; Cornette (yellow card) 73', (goal) 78' | Report | Derrien (yellow card) 30'; Petković 51', 87'; Correa 62' (pen.); Camelo 68', (yellow card) 76'; Gonzalez (yellow card) 77' | Stadium: Stade Océane; Referee: Nicolas Rainville |

| 4 May 2021 34 | Le Havre | 0–1 | Toulouse | Le Havre |
| 19:00 CET (UTC+1) | Bonnet (yellow card) 4' (yellow-red card) 60'; Lekhal (yellow card) 69'; Boutaïb (yellow card) 89' | Report | Koné 28'; Van den Boomen (yellow card) 47'; Gabrielsen (yellow card) 70'; Spierings (yellow card) 77'; Dewaest (yellow card) 83' | Stadium: Stade Océane; Referee: Rémi Landry |

| 8 May 2021 37 | Valenciennes | 3–5 | Le Havre | Valenciennes |
| 20:00 CEST (UTC+2) | Vandenabeele (yellow card) 5'; Boutoutaou 31'; Doukouré (yellow card) 44'; Cuffaut 53' (pen.); Ntim (yellow card) 66'; Macalou 89' | Report | Basque 6', 65'; Thiaré 10'; Boutaïb 42'; M. Fofana 73' | Stadium: Stade du Hainaut; Referee: Mathieu Vernice |

| 15 May 2021 38 | Le Havre | 3–2 | Troyes | Le Havre |
| 20:00 CET (UTC+1) | Ba 25'; Thiaré 31' (pen.); Barker (yellow card) 45'; Alioui 69' | Report | Raveloson (yellow card) 31'; Touzghar 45+1' (pen.); Salmier (yellow card) 61', (goal) 89' | Stadium: Stade Océane; Referee: Romain Lissorgue |

=== Coupe de France ===
| 19 January 2021 Eighth round | Le Havre | 0–1 | Paris FC | Le Havre |
| 16:00 CET (UTC+1) | | Report | Martin 8' | Stadium: Stade Océane; Attendance: 0 Referee: Alexandre Perreau Niel |
