= 2019–20 Le Havre AC season =

Le Havre
2019–20 season
- President: Vincent Volpe
- Head coach: Paul Le Guen
- Stadium: Stade Océane
- Ligue 2: 6th
- Coupe de France: Seventh round
- Coupe de la Ligue: First round
Home colours	Away colours

The 2019–20 season was the 149th season in the existence of Le Havre AC and the club's 11th consecutive season in the second division of French football. In addition to the domestic league, Le Havre participated in this season's editions of the Coupe de France and Coupe de la Ligue.

== Players ==
=== First-team squad ===
As of 15 February 2020.

Note: Flags indicate national team as defined under FIFA eligibility rules; some limited exceptions apply. Players may hold more than one non-FIFA nationality.

No.	Pos.	Nation	Player
1	GK	FRA	Mathieu Gorgelin
3	DF	TUR	Umut Meraş
4	DF	TUR	Ertuğrul Ersoy
5	DF	CGO	Fernand Mayembo
6	MF	FRA	Romain Basque
7	MF	FRA	Jean-Pascal Fontaine
8	MF	FRA	Himad Abdelli
9	MF	FRA	Ateef Konaté
10	FW	FRA	Alan Dzabana
11	FW	ZIM	Tino Kadewere (on loan from Lyon)
12	DF	TUN	Ayman Ben Mohamed
13	FW	GHA	Ebenezer Assifuah
14	FW	SEN	Jamal Thiaré

No.	Pos.	Nation	Player
17	MF	FRA	Alexandre Bonnet
18	MF	CAF	Amos Youga
20	DF	MLI	Baba Traoré
21	MF	FRA	Daylam Meddah
22	MF	ALG	Victor Lekhal
23	MF	FRA	Eric Junior Dina-Ebimbe (on loan from PSG)
24	MF	FRA	Pape Gueye
25	DF	HUN	Barnabás Bese
26	DF	FRA	Woyo Coulibaly
28	DF	FRA	Loïc Badé
29	FW	HAI	Hervé Bazile
30	GK	FRA	Yahia Fofana

=== Out on loan ===
Note: Flags indicate national team as defined under FIFA eligibility rules; some limited exceptions apply. Players may hold more than one non-FIFA nationality.

No. / Pos. / Nation / Player; — / DF / BFA / Yacouba Coulibaly (on loan to Paris FC)	No. / Pos. / Nation / Player; — / DF / GLP / Kelly Irep (on loan to Bourg-en-Bresse)

== Pre-season and friendlies ==
Win Draw Loss

13 July 2019 Friendly	Caen	2–0	Le Havre	Mondeville, France
17:30 CEST (UTC+2)		Report		Stadium: Stade Michel Farré

20 July 2019 Friendly	Angers	3–2	Le Havre	Sablé, France
16:30 CEST (UTC+2)	Fulgini 4', 16'; El Melali 45+1'		Thiaré 25'; Kadewere 90'	Stadium: Stade Rémy Lambert

== Competitions ==
=== Overall record ===
Competition	First match	Last match	Starting round	Final position	Record							
Competition	First match	Last match	Starting round	Final position	Pld	W	D	L	GF	GA	GD	Win %
Ligue 2	26 July 2019	6 March 2020	Matchday 1	6th	28	11	11	6	38	25	+13	39.29
Coupe de France	15 November 2019		Seventh round	Seventh round	1	0	0	1	1	3	−2	0.00
Coupe de la Ligue	13 August 2019		First round	First round	1	0	1	0	1	1	+0	0.00
Total					30	11	12	7	40	29	+11	36.67

Source: Soccerway

=== Ligue 2 ===
==== League table ====
Pos	Team	Pld	W	D	L	GF	GA	GD	Pts
4	Troyes	28	16	3	9	34	25	+9	51
5	Clermont	28	14	8	6	35	25	+10	50
6	Le Havre	28	11	11	6	38	25	+13	44
7	Valenciennes	28	11	9	8	24	20	+4	42
8	Guingamp	28	10	9	9	40	33	+7	39

Source: Ligue 2
Rules for classification: 1) Points; 2) Goal difference; 3) Number of goals scored; 4) Head-to-head goal difference; 5) Fair play points

==== Results summary ====
Overall								Home						Away					
Pld	W	D	L	GF	GA	GD	Pts	W	D	L	GF	GA	GD	W	D	L	GF	GA	GD
0	0	0	0	0	0	0	0	0	0	0	0	0	0	0	0	0	0	0	0

Source: Ligue 2

==== Results by round ====
Round	1	2	3	4	5	6	7	8	9	10	11	12	13	14	15	16	17	18	19	20	21	22	23	24	25	26	27	28	29	30	31	32	33	34	35	36	37	38
Ground	A	H	A	A	H	A	H	A	H	A	H	A	H	A	H	A	H	A	H	A	H	H	A	H	A	H	A	H										
Result	D	D	W	W	W	W	D	D	L	L	D	D	D	L	W	W	W	L	D	W	W	D	D	D	L	L	W	W	C	C	C	C	C	C	C	C	C	C
Position																																						

Source: Ligue 2
A = Away; H = Home; W = Win; D = Draw; L = Loss

==== Matches ====
The league fixtures were announced on 14 June 2019. The Ligue 2 matches were suspended by the LFP on 13 March 2020 due to COVID-19 until further notices. On 28 April 2020, it was announced that Ligue 1 and Ligue 2 campaigns would not resume, after the country banned all sporting events until September. On 30 April, The LFP ended officially the 2019–20 season.

26 July 2019 1	Ajaccio	2–2	Le Havre	Ajaccio

2 August 2019 2	Le Havre	1–1	Niort	Le Havre

9 August 2019 3	Troyes	1–2	Le Havre	Troyes

17 August 2019 4	Lens	1–3	Le Havre	Lens

23 August 2019 5	Le Havre	3–1	Grenoble	Le Havre

30 August 2019 6	Caen	0–3	Le Havre	Caen

13 September 2019 7	Le Havre	0–0	Paris FC	Le Havre

20 September 2019 8	Orléans	2–2	Le Havre	Orléans

27 September 2019 9	Le Havre	0–1	Châteauroux	Le Havre

5 October 2019 10	Auxerre	2–0	Le Havre	Auxerre

19 October 2019 11	Le Havre	2–2	Lorient	Le Havre

29 October 2019 12	Valenciennes	0–0	Le Havre	Valenciennes

4 November 2019 13	Le Havre	1–1	Nancy	Le Havre

8 November 2019 14	Sochaux	2–0	Le Havre	Montbéliard

25 November 2019 15	Le Havre	4–0	Guingamp	Le Havre

29 November 2019 16	Rodez	1–2	Le Havre	Rodez

3 December 2019 17	Le Havre	2–0	Le Mans	Le Havre

13 December 2019 18	Clermont	2–1	Le Havre	Clermont

20 December 2019 19	Le Havre	1–1	Chambly	Le Havre

10 January 2020 20	Niort	0–1	Le Havre	Niort

27 January 2020 21	Le Havre	1–0	Troyes	Le Havre

31 January 2020 22	Le Havre	0–0	Lens	Le Havre

3 February 2020 23	Grenoble	1–1	Le Havre	Grenoble

7 February 2020 24	Le Havre	1–1	Caen	Le Havre

14 February 2020 25	Paris FC	1–0	Le Havre	Paris

21 February 2020 26	Le Havre	1–2	Orléans	Le Havre

28 February 2020 27	Châteauroux	0–3	Le Havre	Châteauroux

6 March 2020 28	Le Havre	1–0	Auxerre	Le Havre

13 March 2020 29	Lorient	Cancelled	Le Havre	Lorient

20 March 2020 30	Le Havre	Cancelled	Valenciennes	Le Havre

=== Coupe de France ===
15 November 2019 Seventh round	Le Havre	1–3	Dunkerque	Le Havre
20:00 CET	Basque 37'	Report	Goteni 27'; Bayo 66', 83'	Stadium: Stade Océane; Attendance: 1,938; Referee: Aurélien Petit

=== Coupe de la Ligue ===
13 August 2019 First round	Clermont	1–1 (4–3 p)	Le Havre	Clermont-Ferrand
20:00 CEST	N'Diaye 22' (pen.)	Report	Dzabana 6'	Stadium: Stade Gabriel Montpied; Attendance: 1,785; Referee: Cédric Dos Santos
	Penalties
	Grbic (penalty scored); Donisa (penalty scored); González (penalty missed); Gastien (penalty scored); N'Simba (penalty scored)		(penalty scored) Abdelli; (penalty scored) Dzabana; (penalty missed) Fontaine; (penalty scored) Bazile; (penalty missed) Basque
