= Bentil =

Bentil is a surname. Notable people with the surname include:

- Ben Bentil (born 1995), Ghanaian basketball player
- Emanuel Bentil (born 1978), Ghanaian footballer
- Godwin Bentil (born 2001), Ghanaian footballer
