= 2010–11 Olympique Lyonnais season =

Lyon
2010–11 season
- Owner: OL Groupe
- Chairman: Jean-Michel Aulas
- Manager: Claude Puel
- Ground: Stade de Gerland
- Ligue 1: 3rd
- Coupe de France: Round of 32
- Coupe de la Ligue: Round of 16
- Champions League: Round of 16
- Top goalscorer: League: Lisandro López (17); All: Lisandro López (19)
- Highest home attendance: 39,548 (25 September vs Marseille, Ligue 1)
- Lowest home attendance: 26,587 (27 October vs Paris SG, Coupe de la Ligue)
Home colours	Away colours	Third colours

The 2010–11 season is French football club Olympique Lyonnais's 52nd season in Ligue 1 and their 22nd consecutive season in the top division of French football. The season is the club's second straight season overall where it has not won any silverware. Due to the club's second-place finish the previous season, Lyon will compete in the UEFA Champions League for the 11th-straight season.

== News ==
On 8 June 2010, Lyon reached a three-year agreement on a partnership with Groupama, an international insurance company based in Paris. The deal is valued at €4.5 million a year. The company's logo will be displayed on the back of the player's shirts.

On 9 June, French newspaper L'Equipe reported that Olympique Lyonnais sporting director Marino Faccioli would depart the club on 1 July to become the director of the France national football team. The report also stated that Faccioli was new manager Laurent Blanc's first-choice for the position. Two hours later, Faccioli denied the report stating that no agreements had been made between the two parties. On the previous day, Lyon confirmed the arrival of Philippe Sauze as a new general director. Sauze is the current vice-president of American company Electronic Arts. The hiring of Sauze will redefined the different functions of several directors with the "possible departure of Marino Faccioli to the France team" being in mind.

On 14 June, Lyon confirmed their first transfer arrival to the club after reaching an agreement with Rennes for the transfer of Jimmy Briand. The transfer fee was priced at €6 million and Briand is expected to replace Sidney Govou who departed the club for Greek side Panathinaikos on 5 July.

On 22 July, Lyon officials announced that the club had signed captain Cris to a two-year contract extension until 2013.

On 23 August 2010, Lyon confirmed on its website that the club had reached an agreement with Bordeaux for the transfer of Gourcuff. Gourcuff had reportedly stated the previous day that he wanted to join Lyon. After successfully passing his medical on 24 August, Gourcuff will sign a long-term contract with the club and the transfer fee is priced at €22 million, which will be paid in three installments by 31 December 2012.

On 6 March 2011, Lyon officials confirmed that midfielder Jérémy Toulalan signed a contract extension with Lyon until 2015.

== Transfers ==
=== Summer in ===
No.	Pos.	Nat.	Name	Age	EU	Moving from	Type	Transfer window	Ends	Transfer fee	Source
45	GK	(France)	Gorgelin	19	EU	Youth system	Promoted ✓	Summer	2013	Youth system	France Football
15	DF	(Ghana)	Mensah	27	Non-EU	Sunderland (England)	Loan Return ✓	Summer	2013	N/A	
24	MF	(France)	Pied	21	EU	Metz	Loan Return ✓	Summer	2011	N/A	
—	FW	(France)	Piquionne	31	EU	Portsmouth (England)	Loan Return ✓	Summer	2012	N/A	
7	FW	(France)	Briand	24	EU	Rennes	Transferred ✓	Summer	2014	€6M	OLWeb
38	FW	(France)	Lacazette	19	EU	Youth system	Promoted ✓	Summer	2014	Youth system	Foot National
39	FW	(France)	Belfodil	18	EU	Youth system	Promoted ✓	Summer	2014	Youth system	Le Figaro
29	MF	(France)	Gourcuff	24	EU	Bordeaux	Transferred ✓	Summer	2015	€22M	OLWeb
4	DF	(Senegal)	Diakhaté	26	EU	Dynamo Kyiv (Ukraine)	Loaned ✓	Summer			OLWeb

Total spending: ▼€28 million

=== Summer Out ===
No.	Pos.	Nat.	Name	Age	EU	Moving to	Type	Transfer window	Transfer fee	Source
43	FW	(France)	Court	20	EU	Sedan	Transferred ✓	Summer	Free	
47	MF	(Ivory Coast)	Tie Bi	19	EU	Évian	Transferred ✓	Summer	Free	
14	FW	(France)	Govou	30	EU	Panathinaikos (Greece)	Contract Ended ✓	Summer	Free	
2	DF	(France)	Clerc	27	EU		Contract Ended ✓	Summer	Free	
	MF	(France)	Archimbaud	20	EU	Gap	Transferred ✓	Summer	Free	OLWeb
5	MF	(France)	Bodmer	27	EU	Paris Saint-Germain	Transferred ✓	Summer	€2.5M	France Football
	FW	(France)	Piquionne	31	EU	West Ham United (England)	Transferred ✓	Summer	€1.2M	OLWeb
4	DF	(France)	Boumsong	30	EU	Panathinaikos (Greece)	Transferred ✓	Summer	€500,000	ESPN
15	DF	(Ghana)	Mensah	27	EU	Sunderland (England)	Loaned ✓	Summer	€500,000	OLWeb
46	DF	(France)	Abenzoar	21	EU	Arles-Avignon	Loaned ✓	Summer		OLWeb
	MF	(France)	Heyninck	20	EU	Jura Sud	Transferred ✓	Summer	Free	Foot National
23	DF	(Brazil)	Anderson	30	EU		Contract Terminated ✓	Summer		Le Parisien
29	FW	(France)	Tafer	19	EU	Toulouse	Loaned ✓	Summer		TFC
35	FW	(France)	Seguin	20	EU	Dijon	Loaned ✓	Summer		OLWeb

Total income: ▲€4.7 million

=== Winter out ===
No.	Pos.	Nat.	Name	Age	EU	Moving to	Type	Transfer window	Transfer fee	Source
17	MF	(Cameroon)	Makoun	27	EU	Aston Villa (England)	Transferred ✓	Summer	€6M	L'Equipe

Total income: ▲€6 million

== Squad information ==
N	Pos.	Nat.	Name	Age	EU	Since	App	Goals	Ends	Transfer fee	Notes
1	GK	(France)	Lloris	39	EU	2008	141	0	2013	€8.5M	
2	DF	(Senegal)	Gassama	36	EU	2008	24	0	2011	Youth system	
3	DF	(Brazil)	Cris (captain)	49	EU	2004	276	25	2013	€3.5M	
4	DF	(Senegal)	Diakhaté	42	Non-EU	2010	29	1	2011		
5	DF	(Croatia)	Lovren	37	EU	2010 (Winter)	47	1	2014	€10M	
6	MF	(Sweden)	Källström	44	EU	2006	264	20	2012	€8M	
7	FW	(France)	Briand	40	EU	2010	43	8	2014	€6M	
8	MF	(Bosnia and Herzegovina)	Pjanić	36	EU	2008	113	15	2013	€8M	
9	FW	(Argentina)	López	43	EU	2009	83	41	2014	€24M	
10	MF	(Brazil)	Ederson	40	Non-EU	2008	88	8	2013	€15M	
11	MF	(Brazil)	Bastos	42	Non-EU	2009	82	23	2013	€18M	
12	DF	(France)	Kolodziejczak	34	EU	2008	13	0	2013	€2.25M	
13	DF	(France)	Réveillère	46	EU	2003	296	3	2011	Free	
15	FW	(France)	Novillo	34	EU	2010	1	0	Undisclosed	Youth system	
18	FW	(France)	Gomis	40	EU	2009	95	28	2014	€13M	
19	MF	(Argentina)	Delgado	44	Non-EU	2008 (Winter)	98	9	2011	€11M	
20	DF	(France)	Cissokho	38	EU	2009	82	2	2014	€15M	
21	MF	(France)	Gonalons	37	EU	2009	54	2	2014	Youth system	
22	MF	(France)	Grenier	35	EU	2008	11	0	2011	Youth system	
24	FW	(France)	Pied	36	EU	2009	33	3	2014	Youth system	
28	MF	(France)	Toulalan (VC)	42	EU	2006	207	1	2015	€7M	
29	MF	(France)	Gourcuff	40	EU	2010	34	4	2015	€22M	
30	GK	(France)	Vercoutre	46	EU	2002	53	0	2012	Free	
38	FW	(France)	Lacazette	35	EU	2009	10	2	2014	Youth system	
39	FW	(France)	Belfodil	34	EU	2009	4	0	2014	Youth system	
45	GK	(France)	Gorgelin	35	EU	2010	0	0	2013	Youth system	
48	MF	(France)	Reale	34	EU	2010	1	0	2011	Youth system	

- Last updated: 10 May 2011
- Source: Olympique Lyonnais, ESPN.com

== Club ==
=== Coaching staff ===
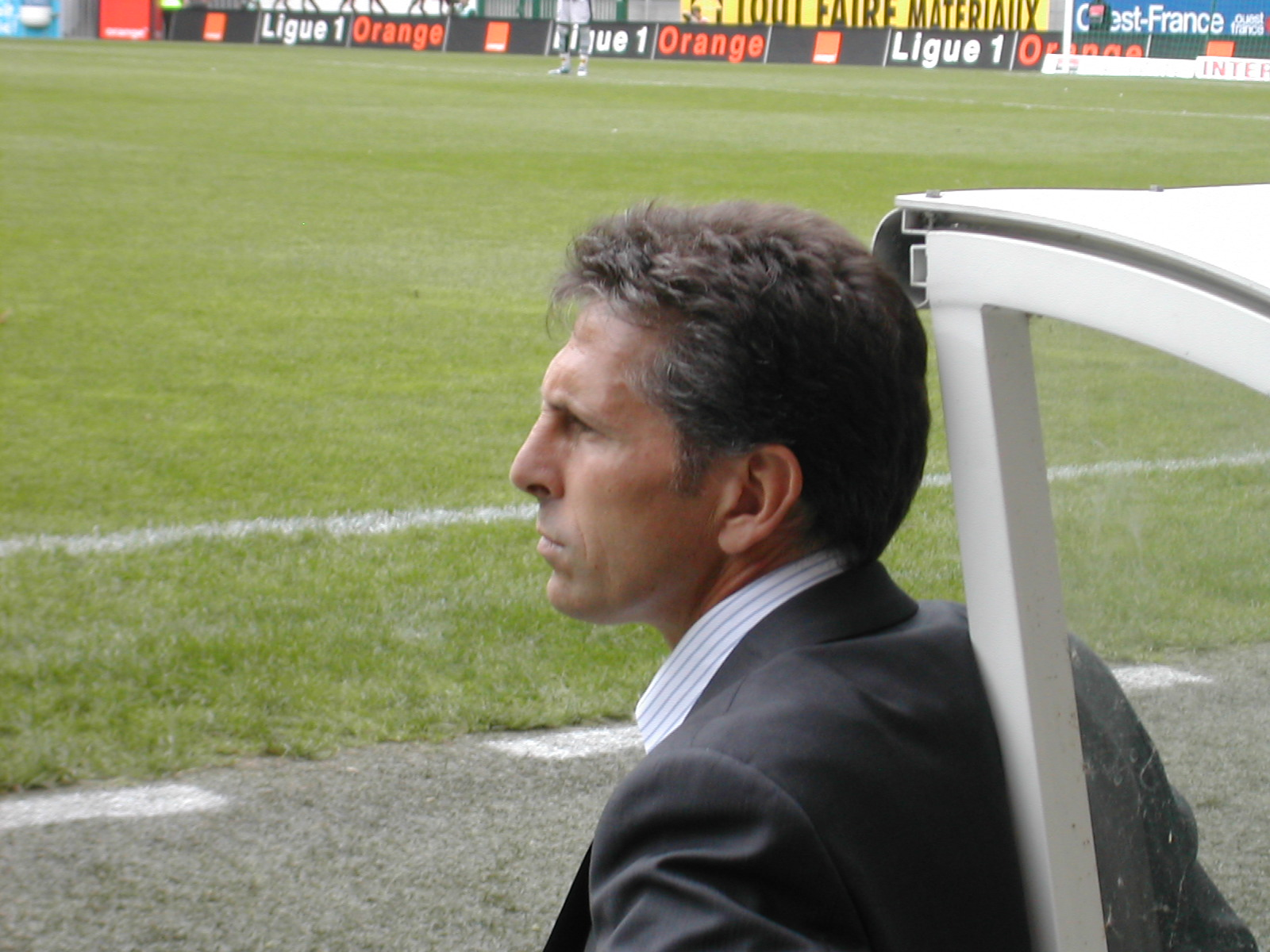
Claude Puel, third season in charge of Lyon.

Position	Staff
Manager	(France) Claude Puel
Assistant manager	(France) Patrick Collot
Second team manager	(France) Bruno Génésio
First team coach	(France) Christophe Toni
Technical coach	(France) Rémi Garde
Striker coach	(Brazil) Sonny Anderson
Goalkeeper coach	(France) Joël Bats
Team doctor	(France) Emmanuel Ohrant
Physiotherapist	(France) Sylvain Rousseau
Physiotherapist	(France) Patrick Perret
Physiotherapist	(France) Abdeljelil Redissi
Fitness coach	(France) Alexandre Dellal
Intendant	(France) Guy Genet
Intendant	(France) Jérôme Renaud

Last updated: 22 June
Source: OLweb.fr

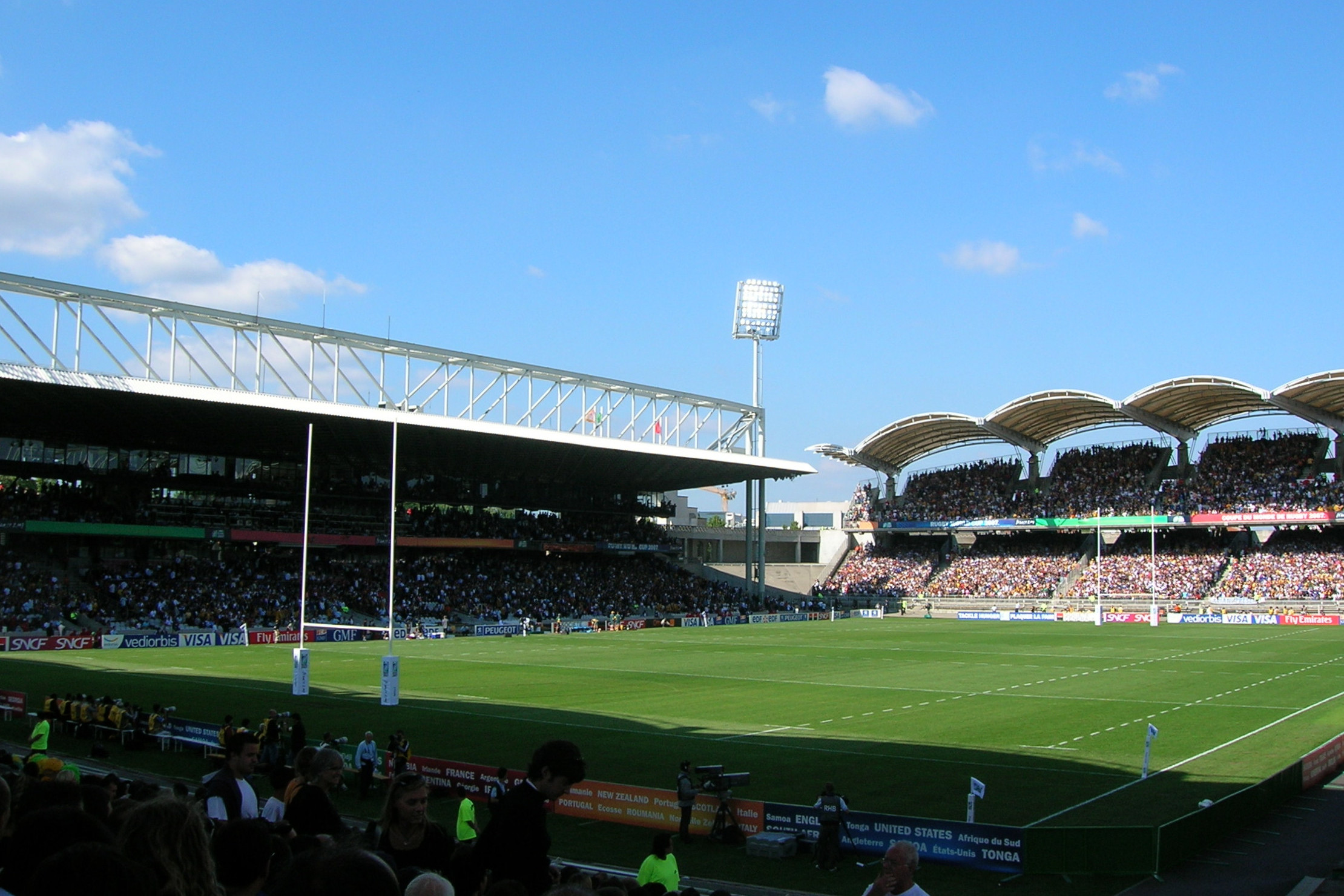
Stade de Gerland, current stadia of Lyon.

=== Other information ===
Chairman	(France) Jean-Michel Aulas
Special Advisor	(France) Bernard Lacombe
Club Director	(France) Olivier Blanc
General Director	(France) Philippe Sauze
Club Ambassador	(Brazil) Sonny Anderson
Ground (capacity and dimensions)	Stade de Gerland (41,044 / 112x65 meters)

Updated to match played 22 June
Source: OLweb.fr

== Team kit ==
On 7 August 2009, Lyon announced that the club would be vacating the club's kit deal with Umbro in order to sign a ten-year deal with the German sportswear brand Adidas, effective at the start of the 2010–11 season with Lyon earning €5 million a year annually from the deal. On 1 July 2010, the club's new home kit was unveiled to the public. The shirt has a white base color with the club's traditional red and blue stripe. However, the stripe, unlike previous seasons, is positioned diagonally across the shirt running from left to right. The club's sponsor, BetClic, features prominently in the middle of the shirt. On 13 July, the club's away kit was unveiled. The kit is strikingly similar to the Russia national team away kit and is mostly burgundy with gold linings around the collar, shoulders, shorts, and socks. The away shirt will feature the club's new sponsor, Everest Poker. The club's European kit was unveiled on 31 July.

Supplier: Adidas
Sponsor(s): BetClic (home), Everest Poker (away)

Home	Away	Third

Last updated: 20 August 2010.
Source: OL Boutique

== Pre-season ==
On 17 June 2010, Lyon confirmed that the team would play six friendly matches ahead of the 2010–11 football season. Prior to contesting the preparation matches, the team trained in the mountainous commune of Tignes. On 7 July, Lyon contested their first match against Swiss club Servette at the Stade Eric Cantona in Tignes. Lyon won the match 3–1 with Ederson scoring a brace in a span of four minutes. The following week, the club embarked on a road trip first traveling to Portugal to play Sporting CP in Lisbon. Lyon lost the match 2–0 conceding the first goal in the 3rd minute of play courtesy of Tonel and, later in the second half, allowing a goal from winger Yannick Djaló to seal the match for the home team. Lyon then traveled to Italy to play Juventus in Cosenza on 24 July. The team suffered their second consecutive defeat losing to the Italians 2–1. Lyon, initially, took the lead following a penalty conversion from Ederson in the 22nd minute, his third goal of the pre-season campaign. However, following an Aly Cissokho red card midway through the first half, Lyon played the rest of the match with ten men and conceded a penalty to Juventus, which was converted by Alessandro Del Piero in the 39th minute. The game-winning goal was scored by midfielder Simone Pepe in the 75th minute.

After departing Italy, the team ventured to England to participate in the 2010 edition of the Emirates Cup. Lyon contested matches on back-to-back days against Scottish club Celtic and Italian club Milan. In the match against Celtic, Lyon took a two-goal lead courtesy of goals from Michel Bastos and youth product Harry Novillo with the former converting a blistering free kick. However, following the entrance of several youth players for Lyon, the club conceded two late goals from Celtic to even the match at 2–2. Against Milan, several veteran players such as Hugo Lloris and Jérémy Toulalan made their debuts in the tournament. Lyon conceded the opening goal in the 55th minute with Milan striker Marco Borriello connecting on a cross from the left side after his shot was initially saved by Lloris. Lyon evened the match in the 79th minute with Jimmy Briand scoring his second goal of the pre-season after running onto a header following a perfect cross from Miralem Pjanić. The 1–1 scoreline was eventually the final result and Lyon were set to be crowned champions of the competition, however, following Arsenal's 3–2 victory over Celtic, the debutantes were knocked back into third place where they remained. Prior to playing in the pre-season tournament, Lyon played Nottingham Forest on 28 July at the City Ground in Nottingham coming out of the match with a 3–1 win. New signing Jimmy Briand and striker Bafétimbi Gomis recorded goals in the match with the latter netting two.

Friendly

7 July 2010	Lyon (France)	3–1	(Switzerland) Servette	Tignes, France
17:00 CEST	Ederson 21', 25'; Gomis 39'	Report	Karanović 70'	Stadium: Stade Eric Cantona; Attendance: 1,200; Referee: Philippe Malige (France)

18 July 2010	Sporting CP (Portugal)	2–0	(France) Lyon	Lisbon, Portugal
21:00 CEST	Tonel 3'; Djaló 72'	Report		Stadium: Estádio José Alvalade; Referee: João Capela (Portugal)

24 July 2010	Juventus (Italy)	2–1	(France) Lyon	Cosenza, Italy
20:45 CEST	Del Piero 39' (pen.); Pepe 75'	Report	Ederson 22' (pen.)	Stadium: Stadio San Vito; Referee: Carmine Russo (Italy)

28 July 2010	Nottingham Forest (England)	1–3	(France) Lyon	Nottingham, England
20:30 CEST	Adebola 34'	Report	Gomis 8', 40'; Briand 63'	Stadium: City Ground; Attendance: 7,178; Referee: Peter Walton (England)

Emirates Cup

31 July 2010	Lyon (France)	2–2	(Scotland) Celtic	London, England
14:00 CEST	Bastos 28'; Novillo 54'	Report	Hooper 82'; Samaras 89'	Stadium: Emirates Stadium; Referee: Ryuji Sato (Japan)

1 August 2010	Milan (Italy)	1–1	(France) Lyon	London, England
14:00 CEST	Borriello 55'	Report	Briand 79'	Stadium: Emirates Stadium; Referee: Minoru Tojo (Japan)

Last updated: 23 June 2010
Source: OLWeb.fr

== Competitions ==
Competition	Started round	Current position / round	Final position / round	First match	Last match
Ligue 1	—	3rd		7 August	29 May
UEFA Champions League	Group stage	—	First Knockout Round	14 September	16 March
Coupe de la Ligue	Round of 16	—	Round of 16	26 October	26 October
Coupe de France	Round of 64	—	Round of 32	8 January	23 January

Updated to match played 16 March 2011
Source: Competitions

=== Ligue 1 ===
==== League table ====
Pos	Team	Pld	W	D	L	GF	GA	GD	Pts	Qualification or relegation
1	Lille (C)	38	21	13	4	68	36	+32	76	Qualification to Champions League group stage
2	Marseille	38	18	14	6	62	39	+23	68	Qualification to Champions League group stage
3	Lyon	38	17	13	8	61	40	+21	64	Qualification to Champions League play-off round
4	Paris Saint-Germain	38	15	15	8	56	41	+15	60	Qualification to Europa League play-off round (Note: As 2010–11 Coupe de France winners Lille qualified for the UEFA Champions League and cup runners-up Paris St. Germain were already ensured of a UEFA Europa League spot via league placement, the play-off round berth reserved for the cup winners was awarded to Sochaux, the fifth-placed team.)
5	Sochaux	38	17	7	14	60	43	+17	58	Qualification to Europa League play-off round

Source: Ligue 1
Rules for classification: 1) points; 2) goal difference; 3) number of goals scored.
(C) Champions

==== Results summary ====
Overall								Home						Away					
Pld	W	D	L	GF	GA	GD	Pts	W	D	L	GF	GA	GD	W	D	L	GF	GA	GD
38	18	12	8	61	40	+21	66	12	6	1	35	12	+23	6	6	7	26	28	−2

Source: lfp.fr

==== Results by round ====
Round	1	2	3	4	5	6	7	8	9	10	11	12	13	14	15	16	17	18	19	20	21	22	23	24	25	26	27	28	29	30	31	32	33	34	35	36	37	38
Ground	H	A	H	A	H	A	H	A	H	A	H	A	H	A	H	A	H	A	H	H	A	H	A	H	A	H	A	H	A	H	A	H	A	H	A	A	H	A
Result	D	L	W	L	D	L	L	W	W	D	W	D	W	W	D	W	W	D	D	W	L	D	W	W	D	W	W	D	D	W	L	W	L	W	L	D	D	W
Position	11	16	10	17	16	17	18	17	14	14	10	11	8	8	8	5	3	4	4	4	3	6	5	4	5	3	3	4	4	3	3	3	3	3	3	3	3	3

Source: lfp.fr
A = Away; H = Home; W = Win; D = Draw; L = Loss

==== Matches ====
Win Draw Loss

7 August 2010 1	Lyon	0–0	Monaco	Lyon
21:00 CET		Report		Stadium: Stade de Gerland; Attendance: 35,275; Referee: Lionel Jaffredo (Brittany)

15 August 2010 2	Caen	3–2	Lyon	Caen
17:00 CET	El-Arabi 2'; Yatabaré 16'; N'Diaye 77'	Report	Gomis 6', 23'	Stadium: Stade Michel d'Ornano; Attendance: 19,937; Referee: Olivier Thual (Aquitaine)

21 August 2010 3	Lyon	1–0	Brest	Lyon
19:00 CET	Makoun 19'	Report		Stadium: Stade de Gerland; Attendance: 32,720; Referee: Philippe Kalt (Alsace)

28 August 2010 4	Lorient	2–0	Lyon	Lorient
19:00 CET	Gameiro 9' (pen.); Kitambala 66'	Report		Stadium: Stade du Moustoir; Attendance: 14,800; Referee: Fredy Fautrel (Basse-Normandie)

11 September 2010 5	Lyon	1–1	Valenciennes	Lyon
19:00 CET	Pied 26'	Report	Bong 69'	Stadium: Stade de Gerland; Attendance: 35,925; Referee: Bruno Coue (Méditerranée)

19 September 2010 6	Bordeaux	2–0	Lyon	Bordeaux
21:00 CET	Diarra 59'; Jussiê 90+2'	Report		Stadium: Stade Chaban-Delmas; Attendance: 29,890; Referee: Lionel Jaffredo (Brittany)

25 September 2010 7	Lyon	0–1	Saint-Étienne	Lyon
21:00 CET		Report	Payet 75'	Stadium: Stade de Gerland; Attendance: 39,408; Referee: Antony Gautier (Nord-Pas-de-Calais)

2 October 2010 8	Nancy	2–3	Lyon	Tomblaine
19:00 CET	André Luiz 58'; Féret 69'	Report	López 37'; Briand 55', 75'	Stadium: Stade Marcel Picot; Attendance: 17,252; Referee: Saïd Ennjimi (Centre Ouest)

17 October 2010 9	Lyon	3–1	Lille	Lyon
21:00 CET	López 3', 56'; Gourcuff 41'	Report	Sow 52'	Stadium: Stade de Gerland; Attendance: 34,976; Referee: Fredy Fautrel (Basse-Normandie)

24 October 2010 10	Arles-Avignon	1–1	Lyon	Avignon
17:00 CET	Dja Djedje 36'	Report	Briand 47'	Stadium: Parc des Sports; Attendance: 11,547; Referee: Pascal Vileo (Aquitaine)

30 October 2010 11	Lyon	2–1	Sochaux	Lyon
19:00 CET	Bastos 31'; Lacazette 69'	Report	Ideye 66'	Stadium: Stade de Gerland; Attendance: 33,992; Referee: Philippe Kalt (Alsace)

6 November 2010 12	Rennes	1–1	Lyon	Rennes
21:00 CET	Ekoko 5'	Report	Bastos 53'	Stadium: Stade de la Route de Lorient; Attendance: 28,357; Referee: Laurent Duhamel (Lower Normandy)

14 November 2010 13	Lyon	1–0	Nice	Lyon
21:00 CET	Pied 30'	Report		Stadium: Stade de Gerland; Attendance: 32,672; Referee: Lionel Jaffredo (Brittany)

21 November 2010 14	Lens	1–3	Lyon	Lens
21:00 CET	Akalé 25'	Report	Gomis 64', 73'; López 89'	Stadium: Stade Félix-Bollaert; Attendance: 32,518; Referee: Olivier Thual (Aquitaine)

28 November 2010 15	Lyon	2–2	Paris Saint-Germain	Lyon
21:00 CET	Cissokho 54'; Gomis 86'	Report	Nenê 63'; Hoarau 83'	Stadium: Stade de Gerland; Attendance: 34,965; Referee: Fredy Fautrel (Basse-Normandie)

4 December 2010 16	Montpellier	1–2	Lyon	Montpellier
21:00 CET	Spahić 80'	Report	López 5', 90+4'	Stadium: Stade de la Mosson; Attendance: 18,990; Referee: Stéphane Bré (Brittany)

12 December 2010 17	Lyon	2–0	Toulouse	Lyon
17:00 CET	López 5'; Gomis 34'	Report		Stadium: Stade de Gerland; Attendance: 32,544; Referee: Hervé Piccirillo (Île-de-France)

19 December 2010 18	Marseille	1–1	Lyon	Marseille
21:00 CET	Valbuena 51'	Report	López 35'	Stadium: Stade Vélodrome; Referee: Clément Turpin (Bourgogne)

22 December 2010 19	Lyon	1–1	Auxerre	Lyon
19:00 CET	Mignot 45+1' (o.g.)	Report	Quercia 46'	Stadium: Stade de Gerland; Referee: Ruddy Buquet (Picardie)

15 January 2011 20	Lyon	3–0	Lorient	Lyon
21:00 CET	Gomis 41', 56'; Källström 53'	Report		Stadium: Stade de Gerland; Referee: Pascal Vileo (Aquitaine)

29 January 2011 21	Valenciennes	2–1	Lyon	Valenciennes
19:00 CET	Biševac 51' (pen.); Pujol 58'	Report	Bastos 70'	Stadium: Stade Nungesser; Referee: Sébastien Moreira (Franche-Comté)

6 February 2011 22	Lyon	0–0	Bordeaux	Lyon
21:00 CET		Report		Stadium: Stade de Gerland; Referee: Stéphane Lannoy (Nord-Pas-de-Calais)

12 February 2011 23	Saint-Étienne	1–4	Lyon	Saint-Étienne
21:00 CET	Bocanegra 13'	Report	Gomis 28'; Bayal Sall 40' (o.g.); Bastos 69'; Briand 90+1'	Stadium: Stade Geoffroy-Guichard; Referee: Lionel Jaffredo (Brittany)

18 February 2011 24	Lyon	4–0	Nancy	Lyon
20:45 CET	Gourcuff 37'; Pied 76'; Pjanić 86'; Briand 89'	Report		Stadium: Stade de Gerland; Referee: Olivier Thual (Aquitaine)

27 February 2011 25	Lille	1–1	Lyon	Villeneuve-d'Ascq
21:00 CET	Sow 8'	Report	Källström 26'	Stadium: Stadium Nord Lille Métropole; Attendance: 17,166; Referee: Laurent Duhamel (Lower Normandy)

6 March 2011 26	Lyon	5–0	Arles-Avignon	Lyon
17:00 CET	López 14', 51', 55'; Pjanić 18'; Bastos 90+3'	Report		Stadium: Stade de Gerland; Referee: Jerome Miguelgorry

12 March 2011 27	Sochaux	0–2	Lyon	Montbéliard
19:00 CET		Report	López 22'; Pjanić 64'	Stadium: Stade Auguste Bonal; Referee: Jean-Charles Cailleux (Picardy)

19 March 2011 28	Lyon	1–1	Rennes	Lyon
21:00 CET	Gomis 28'	Report	Théophile-Catherine 87'	Stadium: Stade de Gerland; Referee: Antony Gautier (Nord-Pas-de-Calais)

2 April 2011 29	Nice	2–2	Lyon	Nice
17:00 CEST	Mouloungui 90'; Civelli 90+3'	Report	Källström 22'; López 45'	Stadium: Stade du Ray; Referee: Stéphane Bré (Brittany)

10 April 2011 30	Lyon	3–0	Lens	Lyon
21:00 CEST	Bedimo 55' (o.g.); Briand 61'; López 90+1'	Report		Stadium: Stade de Gerland; Referee: Ruddy Buquet (Picardie)

17 April 2011 31	Paris Saint-Germain	1–0	Lyon	Paris
21:00 CEST	Camara 76'	Report		Stadium: Parc des Princes; Referee: Laurent Duhamel (Lower Normandy)

27 April 2011 32	Lyon	3–2	Montpellier	Lyon
19:00 CEST	Ederson 23'; López 55'; Gourcuff 90'	Report	Giroud 30'; Camara 84'	Stadium: Stade de Gerland; Referee: Hervé Piccirillo (Île-de-France)

1 May 2011 33	Toulouse	2–0	Lyon	Toulouse
19:00 CEST	Cetto 29'; Cissokho 68' (o.g.)	Report		Stadium: Stadium Municipal; Referee: Fredy Fautrel (Basse-Normandie)

8 May 2011 34	Lyon	3–2	Marseille	Lyon
21:00 CEST	López 25' (pen.); Delgado 69'; Cris 84'	Report	González 70'; Rémy 78'	Stadium: Stade de Gerland; Attendance: 39,548; Referee: Stéphane Lannoy (Nord-Pas-de-Calais)

11 May 2011 35	Auxerre	4–0	Lyon	Auxerre
19:00 CET	Oliech 20'; Traoré 45+1', 50'; Hengbart 79'	Report		Stadium: Stade de l'Abbé-Deschamps; Referee: Philippe Kalt (Alsace)

16 May 2011 36	Brest	1–1	Lyon	Brest
21:00 CET	Licka 76'	Report	Ederson 15'	Stadium: Stade Francis-Le Blé

21 May 2011 37	Lyon	0–0	Caen	Lyon
21:00 CET		Report		Stadium: Stade de Gerland

29 May 2011 38	Monaco	0–2	Lyon	Fontvieille
21:00 CET		Report	Diakhaté 67'; López 82'	Stadium: Stade Louis II

Last updated: 2 May 2011
Source: Ligue de Football Professionnel

=== Coupe de France ===
8 January 2011 Round of 64	Caen	0–1	Lyon	Caen
20:45 CET		Report	Diakhaté 74'	Stadium: Stade Michel d'Ornano; Referee: Olivier Thual (Aquitaine)

23 January 2011 Round of 32	Nice	1–0 (a.e.t.)	Lyon	Nice
20:45 CET	Clerc 96'	Report		Stadium: Stade du Ray; Referee: Hervé Piccirillo (Provence-Alpes-Côte d'Azur)

Last updated: 23 January 2011
Source: Ligue de Football Professionnel

=== Coupe de la Ligue ===
27 October 2010 Round of 16	Lyon	1–2 (a.e.t.)	Paris Saint-Germain	Lyon
20:45 CET	Briand 39'	Report	Bodmer 88'; Giuly 101'	Stadium: Stade de Gerland; Attendance: 26,587; Referee: Ruddy Buquet (Picardy)

Last updated: 14 December 2010
Source: LFP

=== UEFA Champions League ===
Lyon entered the 2010–11 UEFA Champions League for the 11th straight season having come off a successful European campaign last year, in which the club reached the semi-finals of the competition. Due to the club's second-place finish last year, Lyon were automatically inserted into the group stage portion of the competition. On 26 August 2010, draw for the group stage of the Champions League was determined. Due to Braga's victory over Sevilla in the third qualifying round, Lyon were inserted into Pot 1. Following the draw, Lyon were inserted into Group B with Portuguese club Benfica from Pot 2, German club Schalke 04 from Pot 3, and Israeli club Hapoel Tel Aviv from Pot 4.

==== Group B ====
Pos	Team	Pld	W	D	L	GF	GA	GD	Pts	Qualification
1	(Germany) Schalke 04	6	4	1	1	10	3	+7	13	Advance to knockout phase
2	(France) Lyon	6	3	1	2	11	10	+1	10	Advance to knockout phase
3	(Portugal) Benfica	6	2	0	4	7	12	−5	6	Transfer to Europa League
4	(Israel) Hapoel Tel Aviv	6	1	2	3	7	10	−3	5	

Source: Soccerway

14 September 2010 1	Lyon (France)	1–0	(Germany) Schalke 04	Lyon, France
20:45 CEST (UTC+02:00)	Bastos 21'	Report		Stadium: Stade de Gerland; Attendance: 35,552; Referee: Ivan Bebek (Croatia)

29 September 2010 2	Hapoel Tel Aviv (Israel)	1–3	(France) Lyon	Tel Aviv, Israel
20:45 CEST (UTC+02:00)	Enyeama 78' (pen.)	Report	Bastos 7' (pen.), 36'; Pjanić 90+4'	Stadium: Bloomfield Stadium; Attendance: 12,226; Referee: Howard Webb (England)

20 October 2010 3	Lyon (France)	2–0	(Portugal) Benfica	Lyon, France
20:45 CEST (UTC+02:00)	Briand 21'; López 51'	Report		Stadium: Stade de Gerland; Attendance: 36,816; Referee: Alberto Undiano Mallenco (Spain)

2 November 2010 4	Benfica (Portugal)	4–3	(France) Lyon	Lisbon, Portugal
20:45 CET (UTC+01:00)	Alan Kardec 20'; Coentrão 32', 67'; García 42'	Report	Gourcuff 74'; Gomis 85'; Lovren 90+5'	Stadium: Estádio da Luz; Attendance: 37,394; Referee: Craig Thomson (Scotland)

24 November 2010 5	Schalke 04 (Germany)	3–0	(France) Lyon	Gelsenkirchen, Germany
20:45 CET (UTC+01:00)	Farfán 13'; Huntelaar 20', 89'	Report		Stadium: Veltins-Arena; Attendance: 51,132; Referee: Nicola Rizzoli (Italy)

7 December 2010 6	Lyon (France)	2–2	(Israel) Hapoel Tel Aviv	Lyon, France
20:45 CET (UTC+01:00)	López 62'; Lacazette 88'	Report	Sahar 63'; Zahavi 69'	Stadium: Stade de Gerland; Attendance: 32,245; Referee: Svein Oddvar Moen (Norway)

==== Knockout phase ====
===== Round of 16 =====
22 February 2011 First leg	Lyon (France)	1–1	(Spain) Real Madrid	Lyon, France
20:45 CET (UTC+01:00)	Gomis 83'	Report	Benzema 65'	Stadium: Stade de Gerland; Attendance: 40,299; Referee: Wolfgang Stark (Germany)

16 March 2011 Second leg	Real Madrid (Spain)	3–0 (4–1 agg.)	(France) Lyon	Madrid, Spain
20:45 CET (UTC+01:00)	Marcelo 37'; Benzema 66'; Di María 76'	Report		Stadium: Santiago Bernabéu Stadium; Attendance: 70,034; Referee: Damir Skomina (Slovenia)

== Start formations ==
Qnt	Formation	Match(es)
28	4-3-3	L1 (18), UCL (7), CDL (1), CDF (2)
16	4-2-3-1	L1 (15), UCL (1)
2	4-4-2	L1 (2)

Last updated: 10 May 2011
Source: Match reports in Competitive matches
Only competitive matches.

=== Starting XI ===
Lineup that started in the club's league match
against Auxerre on 10 May 2011.

No.	Pos.	Nat.	Name	MS	Notes
1	GK	(France)	Lloris	44	
13	RB	(France)	Réveillère	42	
5	CB	(Croatia)	Lovren	35	
3	CB	(Brazil)	Cris	21	
12	LB	(France)	Kolo	8	
21	DM	(France)	Gonalons	19	
22	CM	(France)	Grenier	3	
8	CM	(Bosnia and Herzegovina)	Pjanić	18	
11	RW	(Brazil)	Bastos	29	
7	LW	(France)	Briand	20	
18	FW	(France)	Gomis	32	

Last updated: 10 May 2011
Source: Squad stats and Start formations.
Only competitive matches.
Using the most used start formation.
Ordered by position on pitch (from back right to front left).

== Squad stats ==
=== Appearances and goals ===
Last updated on 10 May 2011.

No.	Pos	Nat	Player	Total		Ligue 1		Champions League		Coupe de la Ligue		Coupe de France	
No.	Pos	Nat	Player	Apps	Goals	Apps	Goals	Apps	Goals	Apps	Goals	Apps	Goals
1	GK	(France) FRA	Hugo Lloris	44	0	34	0	8	0	0	0	2	0
2	DF	(France) FRA	Lamine Gassama	5	0	4	0	0	0	1	0	0	0
3	DF	(Brazil) BRA	Cris	24	1	18	1	5	0	0	0	1	0
4	DF	(Senegal) SEN	Pape Diakhaté	29	1	21	0	6	0	1	0	1	1
5	DF	(Croatia) CRO	Dejan Lovren	39	1	30	0	6	1	1	0	2	0
6	MF	(Sweden) SWE	Kim Källström	39	3	30	3	6	0	1	0	2	0
7	FW	(France) FRA	Jimmy Briand	43	8	32	6	8	1	1	1	2	0
8	MF	(Bosnia and Herzegovina) BIH	Miralem Pjanić	37	4	28	3	8	1	1	0	0	0
9	FW	(Argentina) ARG	Lisandro López	33	18	25	16	5	2	1	0	2	0
10	MF	(Brazil) BRA	Ederson	5	1	5	1	0	0	0	0	0	0
11	MF	(Brazil) BRA	Michel Bastos	35	8	25	5	7	3	1	0	2	0
12	DF	(France) FRA	Timothée Kolodziejczak	9	0	8	0	1	0	0	0	0	0
13	DF	(France) FRA	Anthony Réveillère	42	0	32	0	8	0	0	0	2	0
15	FW	(France) FRA	Harry Novillo	1	0	1	0	0	0	0	0	0	0
18	FW	(France) FRA	Bafétimbi Gomis	44	12	34	10	7	2	1	0	2	0
19	FW	(Argentina) ARG	César Delgado	20	1	16	1	2	0	0	0	2	0
20	DF	(France) FRA	Aly Cissokho	34	1	26	1	6	0	0	0	2	0
21	MF	(France) FRA	Maxime Gonalons	27	0	22	0	4	0	1	0	0	0
22	MF	(France) FRA	Clément Grenier	9	0	7	0	0	0	1	0	1	0
24	MF	(France) FRA	Jérémy Pied	33	3	22	3	8	0	1	0	2	0
28	MF	(France) FRA	Jérémy Toulalan	32	0	25	0	5	0	0	0	2	0
29	MF	(France) FRA	Yoann Gourcuff	33	4	24	3	7	1	1	0	1	0
30	GK	(France) FRA	Rémy Vercoutre	2	0	1	0	0	0	1	0	0	0
38	FW	(France) FRA	Alexandre Lacazette	9	2	7	1	2	1	0	0	0	0
39	FW	(France) FRA	Ishak Belfodil	0	0	0	0	0	0	0	0	0	0
45	GK	(France) FRA	Mathieu Gorgelin	0	0	0	0	0	0	0	0	0	0
48	MF	(France) FRA	Enzo Reale	1	0	1	0	0	0	0	0	0	0
Players sold after the start of the season:
17	MF	(Cameroon) CMR	Jean Makoun	16	1	12	1	3	0	0	0	1	0

=== Other statistics ===
Note: For all official competitions

No.	Pos.	Nationality	Player	Assists	Minutes Played	Yellow card	Yellow card Red card	Red card
1	GK	France	Hugo Lloris	0	3900	0	0	0
2	DF	France	Lamine Gassama	0	404	2	0	0
3	DF	Brazil	Cris	0	1994	3	0	0
4	DF	Senegal	Pape Diakhaté	0	2590	8	1	0
5	DF	Croatia	Dejan Lovren	0	2955	10	2	0
6	MF	Sweden	Kim Källström	2	2890	5	0	0
7	FW	France	Jimmy Briand	5	2792	7	0	0
8	MF	Bosnia and Herzegovina	Miralem Pjanić	1	1744	4	0	0
9	FW	Argentina	Lisandro López	5	2486	2	0	0
10	MF	Brazil	Ederson	0	253	0	0	0
11	MF	Brazil	Michel Bastos	7	2329	8	1	0
12	DF	France	Timothée Kolodziejczak	1	675	1	0	0
13	DF	France	Anthony Réveillère	1	3635	6	1	0
15	FW	France	Harry Novillo	0	7	0	0	0
18	FW	France	Bafétimbi Gomis	3	2876	0	0	0
19	MF	Argentina	César Delgado	2	743	0	0	0
20	DF	France	Aly Cissokho	0	2845	2	0	2
21	MF	France	Maxime Gonalons	2	1718	3	0	0
22	MF	France	Clément Grenier	0	244	0	0	0
24	MF	France	Jérémy Pied	1	1168	6	1	0
28	MF	France	Jérémy Toulalan	1	2622	6	0	0
29	MF	France	Yoann Gourcuff	3	2283	1	0	0
30	GK	France	Rémy Vercoutre	0	210	1	1	0
38	FW	France	Alexandre Lacazette	2	146	0	0	0
39	FW	France	Ishak Belfodil	0	0	0	0	0
45	GK	France	Mathieu Gorgelin	0	0	0	0	0
48	MF	France	Enzo Reale	0	0	0	0	0

Last updated: 10 May 2011
Source: Competitive matches and lfp.fr
Only competitive matches
(yellow card) = Number of bookings; (second yellow card) = Number of sending offs after a second yellow card; (red card) = Number of sending offs by a direct red card..
