= Ayman Ben Mohamed =

Tunisian footballer

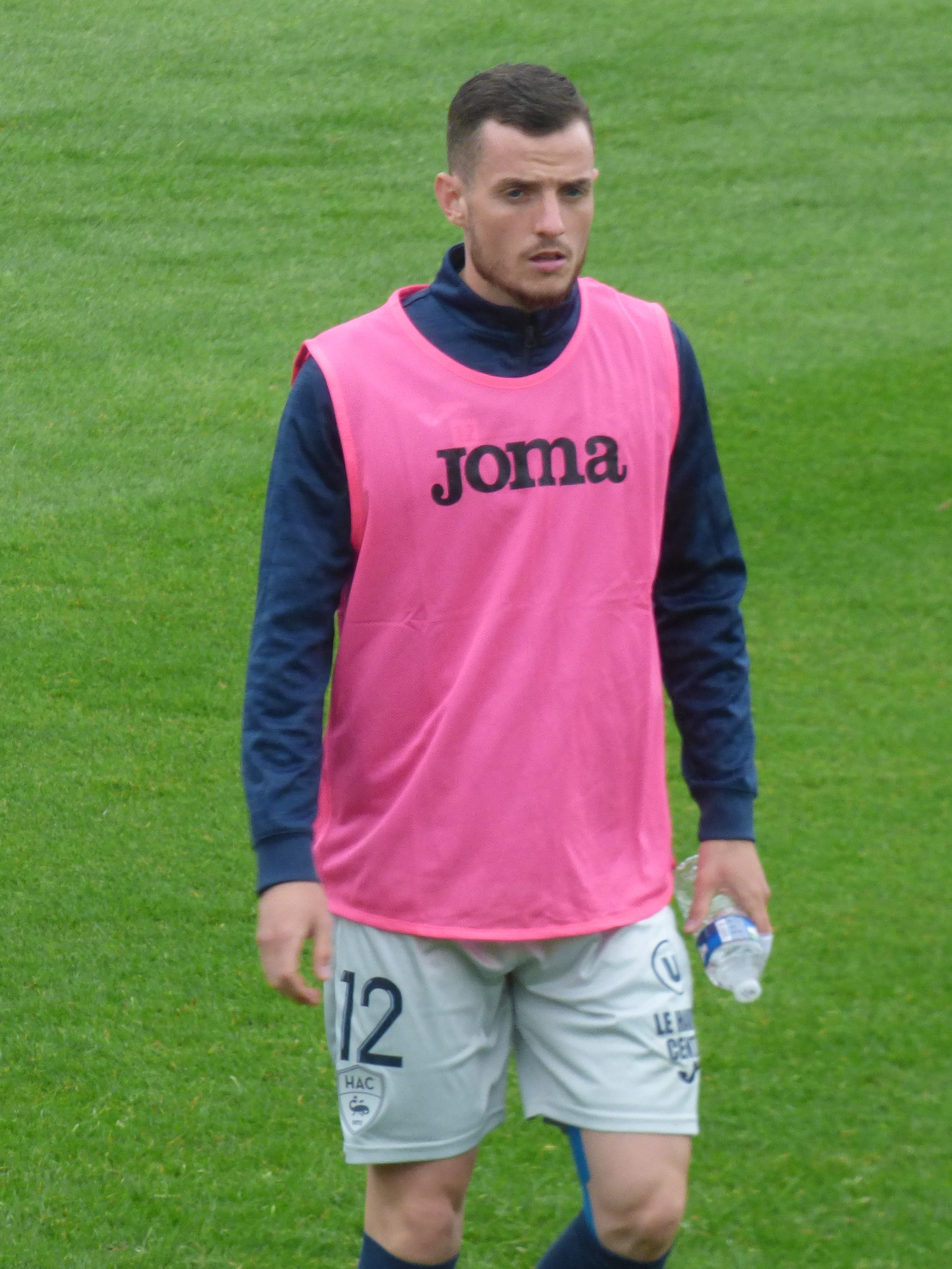
- Ben Mohamed with Le Havre in 2020

Personal information
- Full name: Ayman Ben Mohamed
- Date of birth: 8 December 1994 (age 31)
- Place of birth: London, England
- Height: 1.75 m (5 ft 9 in)
- Position: Left-back

Team information
- Current team: US Monastir
- Number: 16

Senior career*
Years	Team	Apps	(Gls)
2012–2014	UCD	17	(1)
2015	Longford Town	27	(2)
2016	Bohemians	17	(2)
2016–2019	Espérance de Tunis	13	(0)
2019–2022	Le Havre	35	(1)
2022	Le Havre II	3	(0)
2021	→ Denizlispor (loan)	7	(0)
2023–2024	Guingamp	13	(0)
2024–2025	Espérance de Tunis	10	(0)
2026–	US Monastir	0	(0)

International career^{‡}
2018–2020	Tunisia	14	(0)
- * Club domestic league appearances and goals as of 13 April 2025 ‡ National team caps and goals as of 7 February 2025

Ayman Ben Mohamed (arabic: أَيْمَن بْن مُحَمَّد; born 8 December 1994) is a professional footballer who plays as a left-back for Tunisian Ligue Professionnelle 1 club US Monastir. Born in England, he played for the Tunisia national team.

== Club career ==
Born in London to an Irish mother and Tunisian father, Ben Mohamed and his family moved to Dublin at the age of two. In 2012, he signed for UCD while also studying business, staying with the Students for three seasons before moving onto Longford Town. In November 2015, it was announced Ben Mohamed would join Bohemians for the 2016 season.

After a string of impressive performances for The Gypsies, he attracted international attention, eventually signing for Tunisian side Espérance de Tunis for an undisclosed sum.

In 2017, Ben Mohamed suffered a cruciate ligament injury, ruling him out for over a year. He returned in 2018 in his new position at left back, helping his side win the 2018 CAF Champions League final and qualify for the 2018 FIFA Club World Cup.

A free agent after his Espérance de Tunis contract expired in summer 2019, Ben Mohamed joined Ligue 2 club Le Havre AC in August 2019, agreeing a contract until 2022. He made his Ligue 2 debut for the club vs Grenoble on 23 August 2019, coming on in the 82nd minute and scoring the third goal in a 3–1 win.

On 29 January 2021, Ben Mohamed moved to Turkish club Denizlispor, on a loan deal until the end of the season.

On 31 July 2023, Ben Mohamed signed for Ligue 2 club Guingamp.

== International career ==
In May 2016, whilst at Bohemians Ben Mohamed earned a surprise call-up to the Tunisia squad for the African Cup of Nations qualifier against Djibouti despite never having previously declared for The Eagles of Carthage.

On 2 October 2018, he was called up again and earned his first cap in a 2–1 victory over Niger.

== Career statistics ==
=== Club ===
As of 26 April 2025

Appearances and goals by club, season and competition
Club	Season	League			National cup		League cup		Continental		Other		Total	
Club	Season	Division	Apps	Goals	Apps	Goals	Apps	Goals	Apps	Goals	Apps	Goals	Apps	Goals
UCD	2012	League of Ireland Premier Division	0	0	0	0	0	0	—		0	0	0	0
UCD	2013	League of Ireland Premier Division	0	0	0	0	0	0	—		0	0	0	0
UCD	2014	League of Ireland Premier Division	17	1	0	0	0	0	—		0	0	17	1
UCD	Total		17	1	0	0	0	0	—		0	0	17	1
Longford Town	2015	League of Ireland Premier Division	27	2	4	1	1	1	—		2 (Note: Appearance(s) in Leinster Senior Cup)	0	34	4
Bohemians	2016	League of Ireland Premier Division	17	2	1	0	2	0	—		1	0	21	2
Espérance de Tunis	2016–17	Tunisian Ligue Professionnelle 1	3	0	0	0	—		0	0	—		3	0
Espérance de Tunis	2017–18	Tunisian Ligue Professionnelle 1	2	0	0	0	—		6 (Note: Appearances in CAF Champions League)	0	—		8	0
Espérance de Tunis	2018–19	Tunisian Ligue Professionnelle 1	8	0	2	0	—		11	0	4 (Note: Two appearances in FIFA Club World Cup, one appearance in CAF Super Cup and one appearance in Tunisian Super Cup)	0	25	0
Espérance de Tunis	Total		13	0	2	0	—		17	0	4	0	36	0
Le Havre	2019–20	Ligue 2	16	1	0	0	0	0	—		—		16	1
Le Havre	2020–21	Ligue 2	12	0	1	0	—		—		—		13	0
Le Havre	2021–22	Ligue 2	7	0	0	0	—		—		—		7	0
Le Havre	Total		35	1	1	0	0	0	—		—		36	1
Le Havre II	2021–22	Championnat National 3	3	0	—		—		—		—		3	0
Denizlispor (loan)	2020–21	Süper Lig	7	0	—		—		—		—		7	0
Guingamp	2023–24	Ligue 2	13	0	2	0	—		—		—		15	0
Espérance de Tunis	2024–25	Tunisian Ligue Professionnelle 1	10	0	2	0	—		3	0	0	0	15	0
US Monastir	2025–26	Tunisian Ligue Professionnelle 1	0	0	0	0	—		—		—		0	0
Career total			142	6	12	1	3	1	20	0	7	0	184	8

=== International ===
As of 13 October 2020

Appearances and goals by national team and year
National team	Year	Apps	Goals
Tunisia	2018	3	0
Tunisia	2019	9	0
Tunisia	2020	2	0
Total		14	0

== Honours ==
Espérance de Tunis

- Tunisian Ligue Professionnelle 1: 2016–17, 2017–18, 2018–19, 2024–25
- CAF Champions League: 2018, 2018–19
- Tunisian Super Cup: 2018, 2024
- Tunisian Cup: 2024–25
