= Alexandre Bonnet =

French footballer (born 1986)

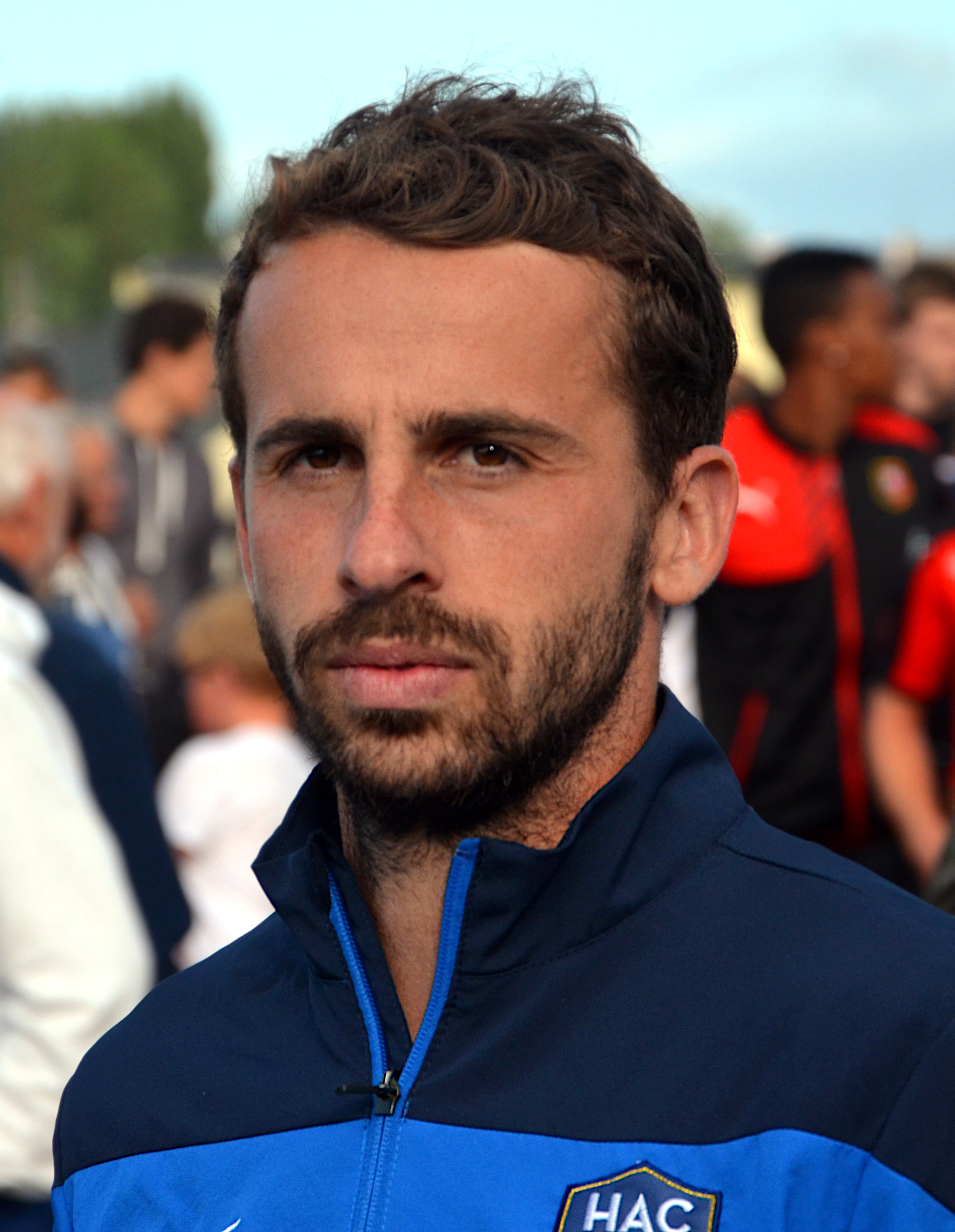
- Bonnet with Le Havre in 2015

Personal information
- Date of birth: 17 October 1986 (age 40)
- Place of birth: La Roche-sur-Yon, France
- Height: 1.73 m (5 ft 8 in)
- Position: Midfielder

Senior career*
Years	Team	Apps	(Gls)
2005–2009	Toulouse	44	(1)
2006–2007	→ Sedan (loan)	36	(6)
2009–2022	Le Havre	436	(46)
2011–2020	Le Havre B	3	(0)
2022–2024	Quevilly-Rouen	39	(0)

International career
2006–2008	France U21	4	(1)
- * Club domestic league appearances and goals as of 16 June 2024

Alexandre Bonnet (born 17 October 1986) is a French professional footballer who plays as a midfielder.

== Club career ==
Bonnet made his professional debut with Toulouse.

In 2009, Bonnet joined Ligue 2 club Le Havre. In June 2022, he announced his departure from the club after thirteen seasons. He made 470 appearances and scored 52 goals for Le Havre, becoming the club's captain. Bonnet subsequently signed for Quevilly-Rouen, also in Ligue 2.

== International career ==
Between 2006 and 2008, Bonnet made four appearances and scored one goal for the France U21 national team.

== Career statistics ==
As of 1 June 2022

Appearances and goals by club, season and competition
Club	Season	League			Coupe de France		Coupe de la Ligue		Other		Total	
Club	Season	Division	Apps	Goals	Apps	Goals	Apps	Goals	Apps	Goals	Apps	Goals
Toulouse	2005–06	Ligue 1	15	1	1	0	2	0	–		18	1
Toulouse	2006–07	Ligue 1	13	0	0	0	2	1	–		15	1
Toulouse	2008–09	Ligue 1	16	0	5	0	1	0	–		22	0
Toulouse	Total		44	1	6	0	5	1	0	0	55	2
Sedan (loan)	2007–08	Ligue 2	36	6	4	1	1	0	–		41	7
Le Havre	2009–10	Ligue 2	35	2	0	0	0	0	–		35	2
Le Havre	2010–11	Ligue 2	34	2	0	0	2	0	–		36	2
Le Havre	2011–12	Ligue 2	37	2	2	0	2	0	–		41	2
Le Havre	2012–13	Ligue 2	37	5	2	1	1	0	–		40	6
Le Havre	2013–14	Ligue 2	34	2	0	0	2	0	–		36	2
Le Havre	2014–15	Ligue 2	33	7	0	0	2	0	–		35	7
Le Havre	2015–16	Ligue 2	37	5	0	0	1	0	–		38	5
Le Havre	2016–17	Ligue 2	37	2	1	0	2	0	–		40	2
Le Havre	2017–18	Ligue 2	36	3	0	0	1	0	2	1	39	4
Le Havre	2018–19	Ligue 2	28	2	2	0	3	2	–		33	4
Le Havre	2019–20	Ligue 2	22	1	0	0	0	0	–		22	1
Le Havre	2020–21	Ligue 2	29	7	0	0	0	0	–		29	7
Le Havre	2021–22	Ligue 2	35	1	2	0	0	0	–		37	1
Le Havre	Total		434	41	9	1	16	2	2	1	461	45
Career total			514	48	19	2	22	3	2	1	557	54
