= Mathieu Gorgelin =

French footballer (born 1990)

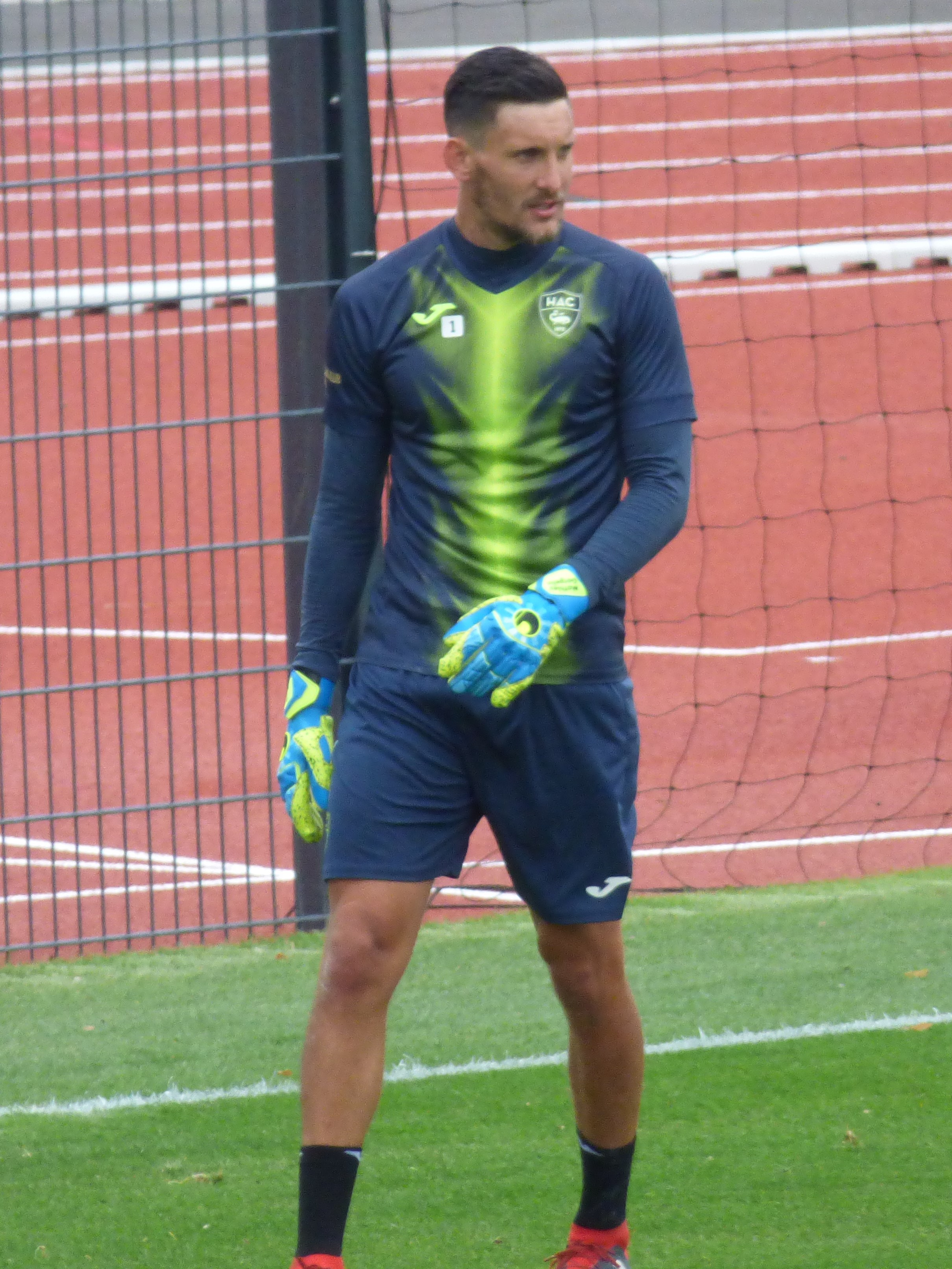
- Gorgelin with Le Havre in 2020

Personal information
- Date of birth: 5 August 1990 (age 36)
- Place of birth: Ambérieu-en-Bugey, France
- Height: 1.87 m (6 ft 2 in)
- Position: Goalkeeper

Team information
- Current team: Lens
- Number: 16

Youth career
- 1996–1997: Ambérieu
- 1997–1998: Saint-Denis-en-Bugey Ambutrix
- 1998–2002: Ambérieu
- 2002–2010: Lyon

Senior career*
Years	Team	Apps	(Gls)
2010–2019	Lyon B	43	(0)
2010–2019	Lyon	12	(0)
2011–2012	→ Red Star (loan)	15	(0)
2019–2025	Le Havre	92	(0)
2021	Le Havre B	1	(0)
2026–	Lens	1	(0)

International career^{‡}
2011	France U20	2	(0)
2011	France U21	1	(0)
- * Club domestic league appearances and goals as of 17 May 2026 ‡ National team caps and goals as of 6 June 2011

Mathieu Gorgelin (French pronunciation: [matjø ɡɔʁʒəlɛ̃]; born 5 August 1990) is a French professional footballer who plays as a goalkeeper for Ligue 1 club Lens.

== Club career ==
Born in Ambérieu-en-Bugey, Gorgelin developed through the Lyon academy. He first became a team member in 2010. During the 2011–12 season, he was loaned out to Red Star. He made his debut in Ligue 1 on 2 November 2013, in a 2–0 home win against EA Guingamp, entering the field after 32 minutes for injured goalkeeper Anthony Lopes, and keeping a clean sheet on his competitive debut for the club.

On 28 June 2019, Le Havre announced that they had signed Gorgelin on a three-year contract.

On 19 January 2026, Gorgelin signed with Lens until the end of the 2025–26 season.

== International career ==
Gorgelin has represented France at under-20 and under-21 level.

== Career statistics ==
As of match played 17 May 2026

Appearances and goals by club, season and competition
Club	Season	League			National cup		League cup		Europe		Other		Total	
Club	Season	Division	Apps	Goals	Apps	Goals	Apps	Goals	Apps	Goals	Apps	Goals	Apps	Goals
Lyon B	2010–11	CFA	26	0	—		—		—		—		26	0
Lyon B	2012–13	CFA	9	0	—		—		—		—		9	0
Lyon B	2013–14	CFA	2	0	—		—		—		—		2	0
Lyon B	2016–17	CFA	2	0	—		—		—		—		2	0
Lyon B	2017–18	CFA 2	1	0	—		—		—		—		1	0
Lyon B	2018–19	CFA 2	3	0	—		—		—		—		3	0
Lyon B	Total		43	0	—		—		—		—		43	0
Lyon	2010–11	Ligue 1	0	0	0	0	0	0	0	0	—		0	0
Lyon	2011–12	Ligue 1	0	0	—		—		—		—		0	0
Lyon	2012–13	Ligue 1	0	0	0	0	0	0	0	0	0	0	0	0
Lyon	2013–14	Ligue 1	2	0	0	0	1	0	0	0	—		3	0
Lyon	2014–15	Ligue 1	0	0	0	0	1	0	0	0	—		0	0
Lyon	2015–16	Ligue 1	1	0	0	0	2	0	0	0	—		3	0
Lyon	2016–17	Ligue 1	1	0	0	0	1	0	0	0	0	0	2	0
Lyon	2017–18	Ligue 1	4	0	0	0	1	0	0	0	—		5	0
Lyon	2018–19	Ligue 1	4	0	0	0	2	0	1	0	—		7	0
Lyon	Total		12	0	0	0	8	0	1	0	—		21	0
Red Star (loan)	2011–12	CFA	15	0	2	0	—		—		—		17	0
Le Havre	2019–20	Ligue 2	28	0	1	0	0	0	—		—		29	0
Le Havre	2020–21	Ligue 2	36	0	0	0	—		—		—		36	0
Le Havre	2021–22	Ligue 2	4	0	2	0	—		—		—		6	0
Le Havre	2022–23	Ligue 2	7	0	1	0	—		—		—		8	0
Le Havre	2023–24	Ligue 1	1	0	2	0	—		—		—		3	0
Le Havre	2024–25	Ligue 1	16	0	1	0	—		—		—		17	0
Le Havre	Total		92	0	7	0	0	0	—		—		99	0
Le Havre B	2021–22	National 3	1	0	—		—		—		—		1	0
Lens	2025–26	Ligue 1	1	0	—		—		—		—		1	0
Lens	2026–27	Ligue 1	0	0	0	0	—		0	0	0	0	0	0
Lens	Total		1	0	0	0	—		0	0	0	0	1	0
Career total			164	0	9	0	9	0	1	0	0	0	183	0

== Honours ==
Lens

- Coupe de France: 2025–26
- Trophée des Champions: 2026
