= 2010 UEFA European Under-19 Championship =

Championnat d'Europe de football des moins de 19 ans 2010

Tournament details
- Host country: France
- Dates: 18–30 July
- Teams: 8

Final positions
- Champions: France (7th title)
- Runners-up: Spain

Tournament statistics
- Matches played: 15
- Goals scored: 45 (3 per match)
- Top scorer(s): (Spain) Dani Pacheco (4 goals)
- Best player: (France) Gaël Kakuta

The 2010 UEFA European Under-19 Championship was the ninth edition of UEFA's European Under-19 Championship since it was renamed from the original under-18 event, in 2001. France hosted the championship during July. Ukraine were the title holders, but failed to qualify for the finals. The host country won the tournament. The top six teams qualified for the 2011 Under-20 World Cup.

== Qualification ==
Qualification for the final tournament was played over two stages:

- Qualification – 1 September 2009 – 30 November 2009
- Elite qualification – 1 March 2010 – 31 May 2010

The final tournament of the Championship was preceded by two qualification stages: a qualifying round and an Elite round. During these rounds, 52 national teams competed to determine the seven teams that would join the already qualified host nation France.

The qualifying round was played between 1 September and 30 November 2009. The 52 teams were divided into 13 groups of four teams, with each group being contested as a mini-tournament hosted by one of the group's teams. After all matches were played, the 13 group winners and 13 group runners-up advanced to the Elite round. Alongside the 26 winner and runner-up teams, the two best third-placed teams also qualified.

The following teams qualified for the tournament

- Austria
- Croatia
- England
- France (host)
- Italy
- Netherlands
- Portugal
- Spain

== Group stage ==
Each group winner and runner-up advanced to the semi-finals. The top three teams in each group qualified for the 2011 Under-20 World Cup.

Tie-break criteria for teams even on points:

- Higher number of points obtained in the group matches played among the teams in question
- Superior goal difference resulting from the group matches played among the teams in question
- Higher number of goals scored in the group matches played among the teams in question
- If, after having applied the above criteria, two teams still have an equal ranking, the same criteria will be reapplied to determine the final ranking of the two teams. If this procedure does not lead to a decision, the following criteria will apply:
  - Results of all group matches:
    - Superior goal difference
    - Higher number of goals scored
  - Fair play ranking of the teams in question
  - Drawing of lots
- If two teams which have the same number of points and the same number of goals scored and conceded play their last group match against each other and are still equal at the end of that match, their final rankings will be determined by kicks from the penalty mark and not by the criteria listed above

Legend
Advanced to semi-finals and qualified for the 2011 U-20 World Cup
Qualified for the 2011 U-20 World Cup

All times are Central European Time (UTC+2)

=== Group A ===
Team	Pld	W	D	L	GF	GA	GD	Pts
France	3	2	1	0	10	2	+8	7
England	3	1	1	1	4	4	0	4
Austria	3	1	0	2	3	8	−5	3
Netherlands	3	1	0	2	2	5	−3	3

18 July 2010
18:00

Austria	2–3	England
Alaba 52'; Trauner 74'	Report	Nouble 14', 29'; Cruise 55'

Stade du Hazé, Flers
Referee: Markus Strömbergsson (Sweden)
18 July 2010
20:00

France	4–1	Netherlands
Kakuta 20'; Bakambu 37', 90+3'; Martins Indi 84' (o.g.)	Report	Cabral 55'

Stade Michel d'Ornano, Caen
Referee: Vladislav Bezborodov (Russia)

21 July 2010
18:00

France	5–0	Austria
Griezmann 19', 73'; Lacazette 66', 83'; Reale 80'	Report

Stade du Hazé, Flers
Referee: Alan Black (Northern Ireland)
21 July 2010
18:00

Netherlands	1–0	England
Berghuis 6'	Report

Stade Henry Jeanne, Bayeux
Attendance: 1 500
Referee: Gediminas Mažeika (Lithuania)

24 July 2010
18:00

England	1–1	France
Phillips 90+3'	Report	Tafer 56'

Stade Louis Villemer, Saint-Lo
Referee: Stephan Studer (Switzerland)
24 July 2010
18:00

Netherlands	0–1	Austria
	Report	Djuricin 87' (pen.)

Stade Michel Farré, Mondeville
Referee: Matej Jug (Slovenia)

=== Group B ===
Team	Pld	W	D	L	GF	GA	GD	Pts
Spain	3	3	0	0	7	2	+5	9
Croatia	3	1	1	1	6	2	+4	4
Portugal	3	1	0	2	3	7	−4	3
Italy	3	0	1	2	0	5	−5	1

18 July 2010
16:00

Croatia	1–2	Spain
Andrijašević 42'	Report	Thiago 53'; Rodrigo 64'

Stade Henry Jeanne, Bayeux
Attendance: 2 500
Referee: Alan Black (Northern Ireland)
18 July 2010
16:00

Italy	0–2	Portugal
	Report	N. Oliveira 51'; S. Oliveira 63'

Stade Michel Farré, Mondeville
Referee: Gediminas Mažeika (Lithuania)

21 July 2010
15:00

Spain	2–1	Portugal
Pacheco 12', 88'	Report	Pinto 78'

Stade Louis Villemer, Saint-Lo
Referee: Matej Jug (Slovenia)
21 July 2010
16:00

Croatia	0–0	Italy
	Report

Stade Michel Farré, Mondeville
Referee: Stephan Studer (Switzerland)

24 July 2010
16:00

Portugal	0–5	Croatia
	Report	Andrijašević 19'; Pamić 25', 37', 69'; Ozobić 67'

Stade Henry Jeanne, Bayeux
Attendance: 2 000
Referee: Markus Strömbergsson (Sweden)
24 July 2010
16:00

Spain	3–0	Italy
Rochina 16'; Pacheco 23'; Ezequiel 57' (pen.)	Report

Stade du Hazé, Flers
Referee: Vladislav Bezborodov (Russia)

== Knock-out stage ==
=== Bracket ===
Semi-finals
27 July – Saint-Lo
Spain	3
England	1
27 July – Caen
France	2
Croatia	1

Final
30 July – Caen
Spain	1
France	2

=== Semi-finals ===
27 July 2010
16:00

Spain	3–1	England
Pacheco 12'; Keko 34'; Canales 57'	Report	Bostock 37'

Stade Louis Villemer, Saint-Lo
Attendance: 5 000
Referee: Markus Strömbergsson (Sweden)

27 July 2010
19:00

France	2–1	Croatia
Kakuta 37'; Bakambu 83'	Report	Ademi 4'

Stade Michel d'Ornano, Caen
Attendance: 10 000
Referee: Vladislav Bezborodov (Russia)

=== Final ===
30 July 2010
19:00

Spain	1–2	France
Rodrigo 18'	Report	Sunu 49'; Lacazette 85'

Stade Michel d'Ornano, Caen
Attendance: 20 000
Referee: Stephan Studer (Switzerland)

2010 UEFA U-19 European champions

France
Seventh title

== Goalscorers ==
4 goals

- (Spain) Dani Pacheco

3 goals

- (Croatia) Zvonko Pamić
- (France) Cédric Bakambu
- (France) Alexandre Lacazette

2 goals

- (Croatia) Franko Andrijašević
- (England) Frank Nouble
- (Spain) Rodrigo
- (France) Gaël Kakuta
- (France) Antoine Griezmann

1 goal

- (Austria) David Alaba
- (Austria) Marco Djuricin
- (Austria) Gernot Trauner
- (Croatia) Filip Ozobić
- (Croatia) Arijan Ademi
- (England) Thomas Cruise
- (England) Matt Phillips
- (England) John Bostock
- (France) Enzo Reale
- (France) Yannis Tafer
- (France) Gilles Sunu
- (Netherlands) Steven Berghuis
- (Netherlands) Jerson Cabral
- (Portugal) Nélson Oliveira
- (Portugal) Sérgio Oliveira
- (Portugal) Rúben Pinto
- (Spain) Thiago
- (Spain) Ezequiel Calvente
- (Spain) Rubén Rochina
- (Spain) Sergio Gontán
- (Spain) Sergio Canales

Own goal

- (Netherlands) Bruno Martins Indi (for France)

== Technical team selection ==
Goalkeepers

- (Croatia) 1. Matej Delač
- (England) 1. Declan Rudd

Defenders

- (Spain) 4. Marc Bartra
- (England) 2. Nathaniel Clyne
- (France) 3. Chris Mavinga
- (France) 2. Loïc Nego
- (Spain) 3. Carles Planas
- (Austria) 14. Gernot Trauner
- (Netherlands) 2. Ricardo van Rhijn

Midfielders

- (Croatia) 7. Arijan Ademi
- (Spain) 8. Thiago
- (France) 13. Francis Coquelin
- (France) 8. Gueïda Fofana
- (Croatia) 15. Zvonko Pamić
- (England) 8. Dean Parrett
- (Spain) 6. Oriol Romeu
- (Portugal) 17. Sérgio Oliveira

Forwards

- (France) 17. Cédric Bakambu
- (Netherlands) 11. Jerson Cabral
- (France) 11. Antoine Griezmann
- (France) 7. Gaël Kakuta
- (Spain) 7. Keko
- (Spain) 11. Dani Pacheco

== Tournament team ranking ==
- 1. France
- 2. Spain
- 3. Croatia
- 4. England
- 5. Portugal
- 6. Austria
- 7. Netherlands
- 8. Italy
