= Woyo Coulibaly =

Malian footballer (born 1999)

Personal information
- Full name: Woyo Coulibaly
- Date of birth: 26 May 1999 (age 27)
- Place of birth: Gonesse, France
- Height: 1.85 m (6 ft 1 in)
- Position: Full back

Team information
- Current team: Leicester City
- Number: 26

Youth career
- Ermont
- Entente
- 2012–2018: Le Havre

Senior career*
Years	Team	Apps	(Gls)
2017–2021	Le Havre II	34	(0)
2019–2021	Le Havre	38	(0)
2021–2025	Parma	82	(1)
2025–	Leicester City	5	(0)
2025–2026	→ Sassuolo (loan)	20	(0)

International career^{‡}
2025–	Mali	7	(0)
- * Club domestic league appearances and goals as of 23:23, 19 September 2026 (UTC) ‡ National team caps and goals as of 11:29, 5 June 2026 (UTC)

Woyo Coulibaly (born 26 May 1999) is a professional footballer who plays as a full back for EFL League One club Leicester City. Born in France, he plays for the Mali national team.

== Club career ==
Coulibaly began with his hometown side Ermont, before moving to Entente. He joined Le Havre in 2012, starting with their U13 team. He was part of the U19 Le Havre team that came runners-up in the 2016–2017 Championnat National U19. On 19 June 2019, Coulibaly signed his first professional contract with Le Havre on a three-year deal. Coulibaly made his professional debut for Le Havre in a 1–1 Ligue 2 tie with Niort on 2 August 2019, playing left-back. He extended his contract for another two years on 7 October 2020, making the contract valid until 2024. Le Havre manager Paul Le Guen said of the contract extension: "He has real room for improvement, I see in him a player at the level of L1, even at the top of Ligue 1." Coulibaly established his role on the right flank in the 2020–21 season.

On 30 August 2021, he joined Parma, signing a contract that would last until 2025 and taking the number 26. He made his Parma debut on 12 September in a 4–0 win against Pordenone. Coulibaly quickly settled into the Parma team, featuring regularly under manager Enzo Maresca. On 1 April 2023, he scored his first career goal in a 2–1 victory over Palermo in Serie B.

On 15 January 2025, he signed for Leicester City, for a reported fee of £3 million on a four and a half-year contract. He made his debut on 26 January in a 2–1 win against Tottenham Hotspur, coming on for James Justin in stoppage time.

On 1 September 2025, Coulibaly moved on loan to Sassuolo in Italy.

== International career ==
On 5 June 2025, Coulibaly made his senior debut for Mali in their 1–0 friendly defeat to Congo DR at the Stade de la Source in Orléans, France.

On 11 December 2025, Coulibaly was called up to the Mali squad for the 2025 Africa Cup of Nations.

== Personal life ==
Coulibaly was born in Gonnesse, France. He holds French and Malian nationalities.

== Career statistics ==
=== Club ===
As of match played 24 May 2026

Appearances and goals by club, season and competition
Club	Season	League			National cup		League cup		Total	
Club	Season	Division	Apps	Goals	Apps	Goals	Apps	Goals	Apps	Goals
Le Havre	2019–20	Ligue 2	11	0	1	0	1	0	13	0
Le Havre	2020–21	Ligue 2	26	0	0	0	—		26	0
Le Havre	2021–22	Ligue 2	2	0	0	0	—		2	0
Le Havre	Total		39	0	1	0	1	0	41	0
Parma	2021–22	Serie B	22	0	0	0	—		22	0
Parma	2022–23	Serie B	20	1	2	0	—		22	1
Parma	2023–24	Serie B	26	0	3	0	—		29	0
Parma	2024–25	Serie A	14	0	1	0	—		15	0
Parma	Total		82	1	6	0	—		88	1
Leicester City	2024–25	Premier League	4	0	1	0	—		5	0
Sassuolo (loan)	2025–26	Serie A	20	0	1	0	—		21	0
Career total			145	1	9	0	1	0	155	1

=== International ===
As of match played 4 June 2026

Appearances and goals by national team and year
National team	Year	Apps	Goals
Mali	2025	5	0
Mali	2026	2	0
Total		7	0

== Honours ==
Parma

- Serie B: 2023–24
