= Himad Abdelli =

Footballer (born 1999)

Himad Abdelli حيماد عبدلي
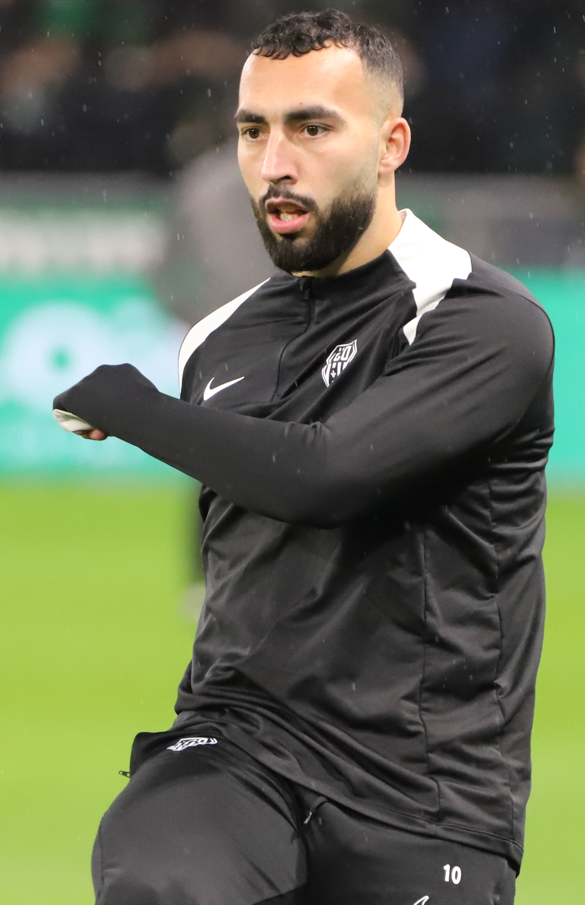
- Abdelli with Angers in 2025

Personal information
- Date of birth: 17 November 1999 (age 27)
- Place of birth: Montivilliers, France
- Height: 1.85 m (6 ft 1 in)
- Position: Midfielder

Team information
- Current team: Marseille
- Number: 8

Youth career
- Le Havre

Senior career*
Years	Team	Apps	(Gls)
2017–2021	Le Havre B	36	(6)
2018–2022	Le Havre	76	(5)
2022–2026	Angers	110	(19)
2026–	Marseille	19	(3)

International career^{‡}
2023–	Algeria	10	(0)
- * Club domestic league appearances and goals as of 22 November 2026 ‡ National team caps and goals as of 29 September 2026 (UTC)

Himad Abdelli (Arabic: حيماد عبدلي; born 17 November 1999) is a professional footballer who plays as a midfielder for Ligue 1 club Marseille. Born in France, he plays for the Algeria national team.

== Early and personal life ==
Abdelli was born in Montivilliers in Normandy, to an Algerian father and a Guadeloupean mother. He holds both French and Algerian nationalities.

== Club career ==
Abdelli made his professional debut for Le Havre in a 2–0 Coupe de la Ligue win over Troyes on 31 October 2018.

In June 2022, Abdelli signed a four-year contract with Angers.

On 2 February 2026, Abdelli moved to Marseille.

== International career ==
Abdelli made his debut for the Algeria national team on 18 June 2023 in a 2–1 win over Uganda in qualification matches for the 2023 Africa Cup of Nations.

== Career statistics ==
=== Club ===
As of match played 22 October 2026

Appearances and goals by club, season and competition
Club	Season	League			National cup		Continental		Other		Total	
Club	Season	Division	Apps	Goals	Apps	Goals	Apps	Goals	Apps	Goals	Apps	Goals
Le Havre B	2016–17	Championnat National 1	2	0	—		—		—		2	0
Le Havre B	2017–18	Championnat National 1	14	5	—		—		—		14	5
Le Havre B	2018–19	Championnat National 1	13	1	—		—		—		13	1
Le Havre B	2019–20	Championnat National 2	3	0	—		—		—		3	0
Le Havre B	2021–22	Championnat National 2	4	0	—		—		—		4	0
Le Havre B	Total		36	6	0	0	0	0	0	0	36	6
Le Havre	2018–19	Ligue 2	16	0	3	0	—		2 (Note: Appearance(s) in Coupe de la Ligue)	0	21	0
Le Havre	2019–20	Ligue 2	13	0	0	0	—		1	0	14	0
Le Havre	2020–21	Ligue 2	25	2	1	0	—		—		26	2
Le Havre	2021–22	Ligue 2	22	3	2	0	—		—		24	3
Le Havre	Total		76	5	6	0	0	0	3	0	85	5
Angers	2022–23	Ligue 1	30	2	3	0	—		—		33	2
Angers	2023–24	Ligue 2	35	9	2	1	—		—		37	10
Angers	2024–25	Ligue 1	32	6	4	0	—		—		36	6
Angers	2025–26	Ligue 1	13	2	0	0	—		—		13	2
Angers	Total		110	19	9	1	0	0	0	0	119	20
Marseille	2025–26	Ligue 1	8	0	1	0	—		—		9	0
Marseille	2026–27	Ligue 1	7	2	0	0	3 (Note: Appearances in UEFA Europa League)	0	—		10	2
Marseille	Total		15	2	1	0	3	0	—		19	2
Career total			237	32	16	1	3	0	3	0	259	33

=== International ===
As of match played 10 January 2026

Appearances and goals by national team and year
National team	Year	Apps	Goals
Algeria	2023	3	0
Algeria	2024	1	0
Algeria	2025	4	0
Total		8	0

== Honours ==
Individual

- UNFP Ligue 2 Team of the Year: 2023–24
