= Enzo Reale =

French footballer (born 1991)

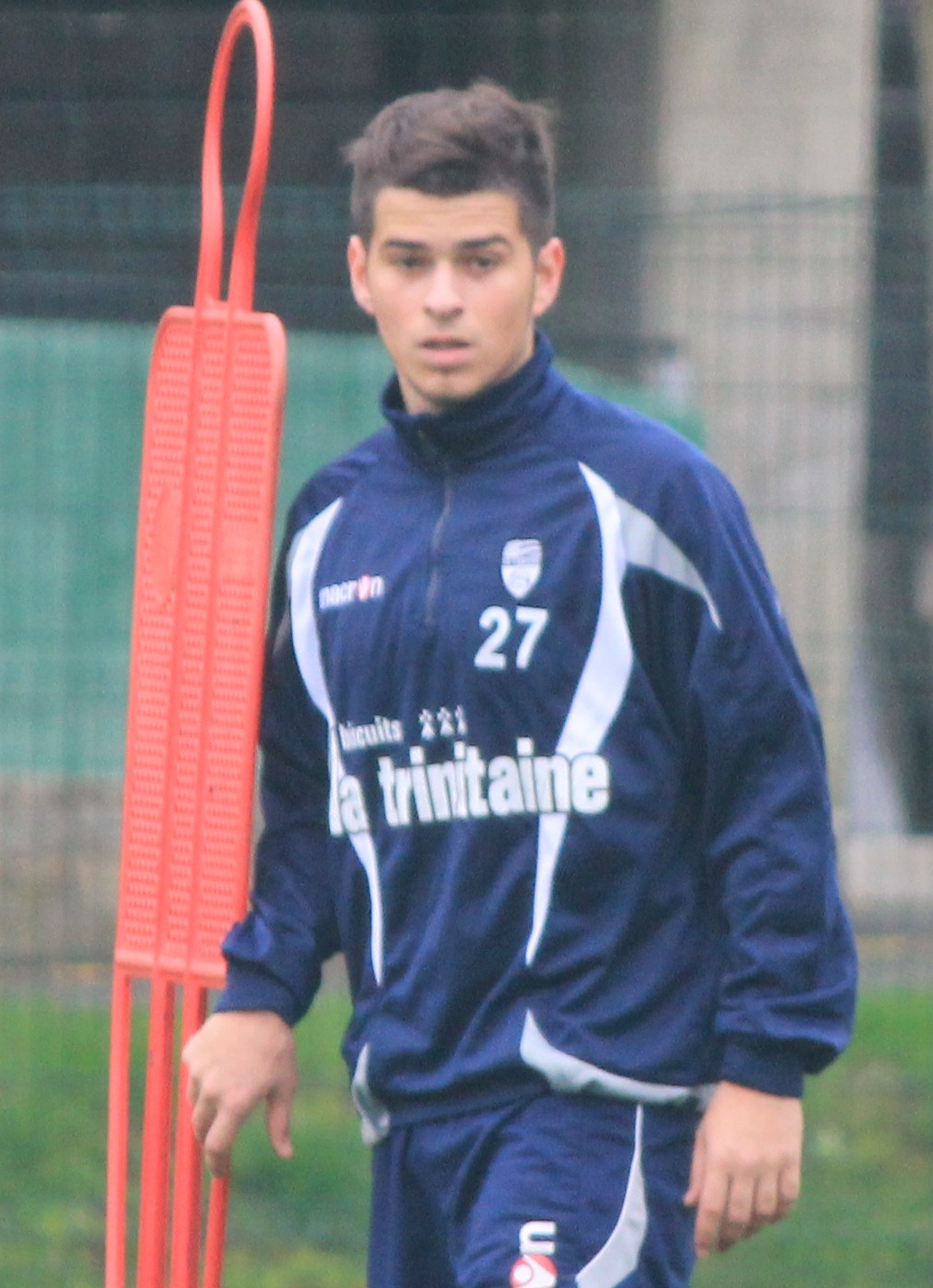
- Reale with Lorient in 2013

Personal information
- Full name: Enzo Reale
- Date of birth: 7 October 1991 (age 35)
- Place of birth: Vénissieux, France
- Height: 1.75 m (5 ft 9 in)
- Position: Midfielder

Youth career
- 1997–1999: Vénissieux
- 1999–2011: Lyon

Senior career*
Years	Team	Apps	(Gls)
2011–2012	Lyon	1	(0)
2011–2012	→ Boulogne (loan)	26	(6)
2012–2015	Lorient	22	(1)
2015	→ Arles-Avignon (loan)	9	(0)
2015–2016	Clermont	16	(1)
2017–2018	Lyon-Duchère	19	(3)
2018–2019	Cholet	22	(0)
2019–2022	Béziers	19	(4)
2019	Béziers B	1	(0)
2022	Manchego Ciudad Real	12	(0)
2022–2025	GOAL FC	35	(2)
Total		182	(17)

International career
2007–2008	France U17	17	(0)
2008	France U18	1	(0)
2009–2010	France U19	6	(1)
2010–2011	France U20	10	(0)
Medal record
Men's football
Representing France
UEFA European Under-17 Championship
Runner-up	2008 Turkey
- * Club domestic league appearances and goals as of 16 June 2024

Enzo Reale (born 7 October 1991) is a French former professional footballer who plays as a midfielder.

== Club career ==
Born in Vénissieux, Reale began his career at local side ASM Vénissieux at the age of six before joining the Olympique Lyonnais youth system in 1999.

After developing in the club's youth academy, in 2008, Réale was promoted to the club's reserve team in the Championnat de France Amateur, the fourth division of French football. He spent over two and a half years playing on the team amassing over 60 appearances before making his professional debut on 11 May 2011 in a 4–0 league defeat to Auxerre.

On 4 September 2012, Reale was sold to Lorient for €1 million. He was then sent on loan to Arles-Avignon in January 2015. Reale joined Clermont in August 2015, with a two-year contract.

On 13 June 2022, Reale signed for Championnat National 2 club GOAL FC on a two-year contract. He retired in January 2025.

== International career ==
Reale has represented his country at under-17, under-18, under-19, and under-20 level. He was a part of the team that won the 2010 UEFA European Under-19 Football Championship on home soil.

== Personal life ==
Reale's father, Alain, was born in Algeria to an Italian Pied-Noir family and played amateur football.
