= Pierre Gibaud =

French footballer (born 1988)

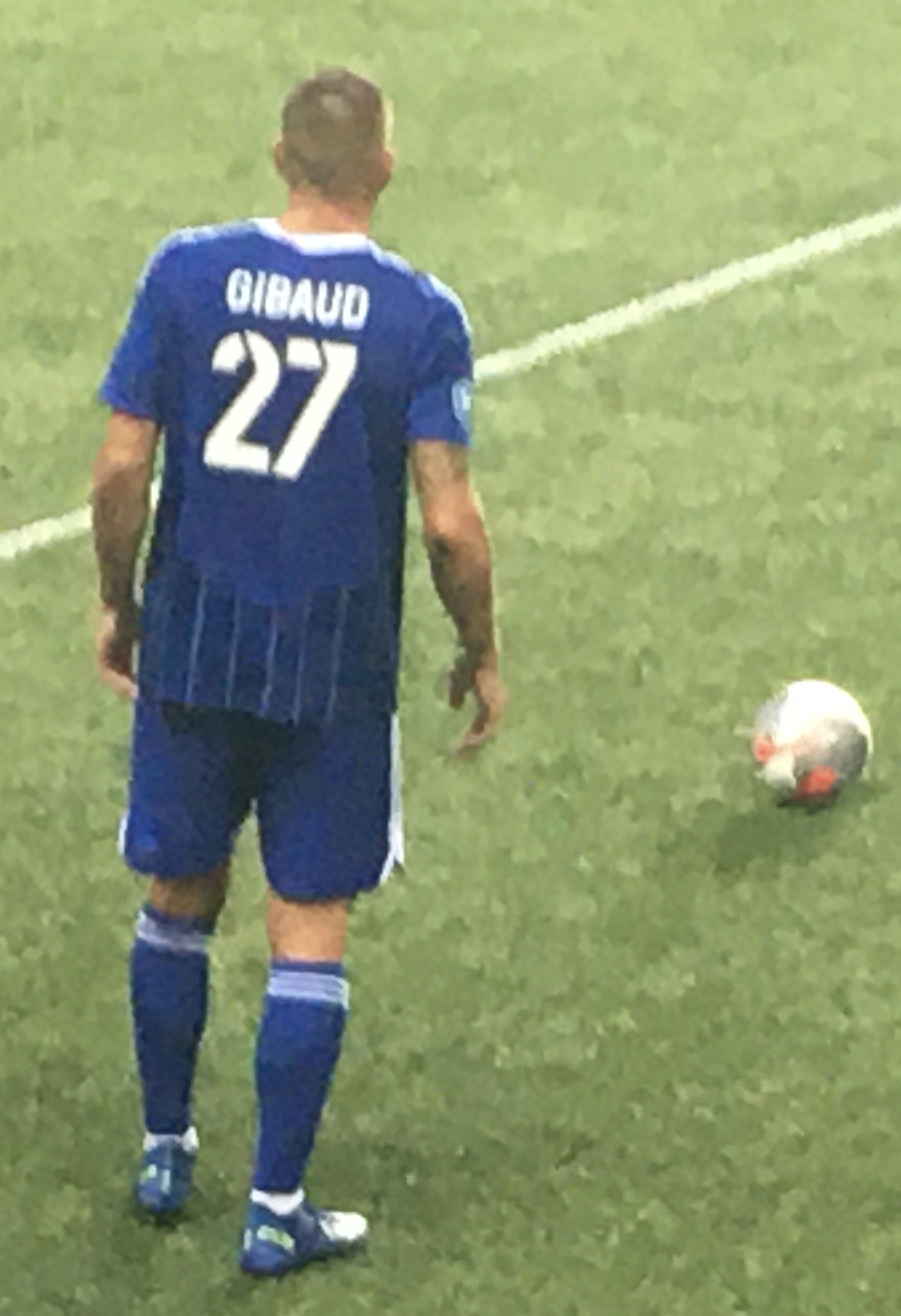
- Gibaud during a free kick with Versailles against Cholet on October 7, 2023.

Personal information
- Date of birth: 22 April 1988 (age 38)
- Place of birth: Laval, France
- Height: 1.84 m (6 ft 0 in)
- Position: Center-back

Senior career*
Years	Team	Apps	(Gls)
2005–2008	Laval	25	(0)
2008–2012	Le Mans	16	(0)
2010–2012	Le Mans B	26	(0)
2012–2013	Red Star	30	(3)
2013	Rouen	0	(0)
2013–2014	Carquefou	22	(2)
2014–2018	Sochaux	102	(1)
2014–2018	Sochaux B	12	(1)
2018–2020	Grenoble	49	(0)
2020–2022	Le Havre	69	(2)
2022–2024	Versailles	30	(0)
- * Club domestic league appearances and goals as of 17 June 2024

Pierre Gibaud (born 22 April 1988) is a French professional footballer who plays as a center-back.
