= Yacouba Coulibaly =

Burkinabé footballer

Personal information
- Date of birth: 2 October 1994 (age 32)
- Place of birth: Bobo-Dioulasso, Burkina Faso
- Height: 1.75 m (5 ft 9 in)
- Position: Left-back

Team information
- Current team: Wasquehal
- Number: 24

Senior career*
Years	Team	Apps	(Gls)
2014–2017	RC Bobo Dioulasso		
2017–2021	Le Havre B	17	(0)
2017–2021	Le Havre	55	(0)
2020	→ Paris FC (loan)	5	(0)
2021	Cartagena	2	(0)
2023–	Wasquehal	4	(0)

International career^{‡}
2015–	Burkina Faso	31	(0)
Medal record
Representing Burkina Faso
Africa Cup of Nations
Third place	2017 Gabon
- * Club domestic league appearances and goals as of 17:59, 20 September 2023 (UTC) ‡ National team caps and goals as of 13:04, 8 March 2021 (UTC)

Yacouba Coulibaly (born 2 October 1994) is a Burkinabé professional footballer who plays as a left-back for French club Wasquehal and the Burkina Faso national team.

== Career ==
Born in Bobo-Dioulasso, Coulibaly has played for RC Bobo Dioulasso, Le Havre and Paris FC. He left Le Havre in January 2021, signing for Spanish club FC Cartagena on 8 March 2021. He later played for Wasquehal in 2023.

He made his international debut in 2015, and was named in their squad for the 2017 Africa Cup of Nations.
