= Alan Dzabana =

French footballer (born 1997)

Personal information
- Full name: Alan Jadal Florian Dzabana
- Date of birth: 25 March 1997 (age 29)
- Place of birth: Livry-Gargan, France
- Height: 1.71 m (5 ft 7 in)
- Position: Forward

Team information
- Current team: Delémont

Youth career
- 2002–2004: AS Breuilloise
- 2004–2012: Torcy
- 2012–2017: Lyon

Senior career*
Years	Team	Apps	(Gls)
2015–2018	Lyon B	44	(19)
2018–2021	Le Havre B	32	(10)
2018–2021	Le Havre	11	(1)
2021	Red Star	8	(1)
2021–2023	Sète	35	(2)
2023	→ Borgo (loan)	6	(0)
2024–2025	Martigues B		
2025–2026	Bobigny	2	(0)
2026–	Delémont	0	(0)
- * Club domestic league appearances and goals as of 13 February 2026

Alan Jadal Florian Dzabana (born 25 March 1997) is a French professional footballer who plays as a forward for Swiss club Delémont.

== Club career ==
Dzabana first began playing football at the age of 5 with AS Breuilloise, moved to US Torcy, and in 2012 joined Lyon's famed youth academy. On 9 March 2017, he signed his first professional contract with Lyon, keeping him at the club until 2020.

Dzabana joined Le Havre on the last day of the winter transfer period, 31 January 2018. He made his professional debut for Le Havre in a 1–0 Ligue 2 loss to Lorient on 5 March 2018.

On 31 January 2021, Dzabana joined Red Star until the end of the 2020–21 season.

== International career ==
Dzabana was called up to the Republic of the Congo national football team for a friendly against Mauritania on 15 March 2017, but he declined the selection as he needed time to reflect on who he wanted to represent.

== Personal life ==
Dzabana's grandfather, Germain, was a legend of Congolese football and represented the Republic of the Congo national football team at the 1968 African Cup of Nations.
