= Godwin Bentil =

Ghanaian footballer (born 2001)

Personal information
- Full name: Godwin Kobby Bentil
- Date of birth: 30 January 2001 (age 25)
- Place of birth: Accra, Ghana
- Height: 1.85 m (6 ft 1 in)
- Position: Forward

Youth career
- Attram de Visser
- 2018–2019: Le Havre

Senior career*
| Years | Team | Apps | (Gls) |
| 2019–2020 | Le Havre B | 11 | (6) |
| 2020–2021 | Le Havre | 7 | (2) |
| 2021–2024 | Niort B | 18 | (7) |
| 2022–2024 | Niort | 30 | (2) |
- * Club domestic league appearances and goals as of 17 June 2024

Godwin Kobby Bentil (born 30 January 2001) is a Ghanaian professional footballer who plays as a forward.

== Career ==
Bentil joined the youth academy of Le Havre in 2018, from the Attram de Visser academy in Ghana. Bentil made his professional debut with Le Havre in a 3-1 Ligue 2 win over Guingamp on 12 September 2020.

On 1 September 2021, he signed a three-year contract with Niort.

Bentil spent a period of time in 2024 on trial with Australia club Adelaide United, scoring twice in a pre-season friendly against West Adelaide.

== Career statistics ==
As of matches played 1 February 2022.

Appearances and goals by club, season and competition
| Club | Season | League | | | Coupe de France | | Total | |
| Club | Season | Division | Apps | Goals | Apps | Goals | Apps | Goals |
|---|---|---|---|---|---|---|---|---|
| Le Havre | 2019–20 | Ligue 2 | 0 | 0 | 1 | 0 | 1 | 0 |
| Le Havre | 2020–21 | Ligue 2 | 7 | 2 | 0 | 0 | 7 | 2 |
| Le Havre | Total | | 7 | 2 | 1 | 0 | 8 | 2 |
| Chamois Niortais | 2021–22 | Ligue 2 | 2 | 1 | — (Note: Niort excluded from the 2021–22 Coupe de France) | | 0 | 0 |
| Career total | | | 9 | 3 | 1 | 0 | 8 | 2 |
