= Fernand Mayembo =

Congolese footballer (born 1996)

Personal information
- Date of birth: 9 January 1996 (age 30)
- Place of birth: Brazzaville, Republic of the Congo
- Height: 1.84 m (6 ft 0 in)
- Position: Defender

Team information
- Current team: Hapoel Tel Aviv
- Number: 5

Youth career
- 2008–2011: Melun FC
- 2011–2013: CS Brétigny
- 2013–2015: Châteauroux
- 2015–2016: Chamois Niortais

Senior career*
Years	Team	Apps	(Gls)
2016–2017	Niort	1	(0)
2017	→ Grenoble (loan)	3	(0)
2017–2018	Grenoble	29	(0)
2018–2022	Le Havre	72	(1)
2022–2023	Ajaccio	11	(0)
2023–2025	Hapoel Haifa	52	(2)
2025–	Hapoel Tel Aviv	29	(0)

International career^{‡}
2017–	Congo	17	(0)
- * Club domestic league appearances and goals as of 23 June 2026 ‡ National team caps and goals as of 10 January 2025

Fernand Mayembo (born 9 January 1996) is a Congolese professional footballer who plays as a defender for Israeli Premier League club Hapoel Tel Aviv. He previously played for several French clubs, including, Chamois Niortais, Grenoble, Le Havre and Ajaccio.

== Club career ==
Mayembo played junior football for Melun FC and CS Brétigny, and spent time in the youth team of LB Châteauroux.

Mayembo made his professional debut in Niort's 4–0 win against Auxerre on 29 October 2016, coming on as a substitute for Junior Sambia.

On July 26th 2022, Mayembo signed a two-year contract with Ajaccio.

On July 31st 2023, Mayembo signed for Israeli Premier League club Hapoel Haifa.

On May 20th 2025, Mayembo signed a two-year contract with Hapoel Tel Aviv.

== International career ==
Mayembo made his debut for the Congo national team in a 1–1 2018 FIFA World Cup qualification tie with Ghana on 1 September 2017.

== Career statistics ==
As of 8 August 2018

Appearances and goals by club, season and competition
Club	Season	League			Coupe de France		Coupe de la Ligue		Total	
Club	Season	Division	Apps	Goals	Apps	Goals	Apps	Goals	Apps	Goals
Chamois Niortais	2016–17	Ligue 2	1	0	0	0	0	0	1	0
Grenoble (loan)	2016–17	CFA Group C	3	0	0	0	0	0	3	0
Grenoble	2017–18	Championnat National	26	0	4	0	2	0	32	0
Career total			30	0	4	0	2	0	36	0
