= Jean-Pascal Fontaine =

French footballer (born 1989)

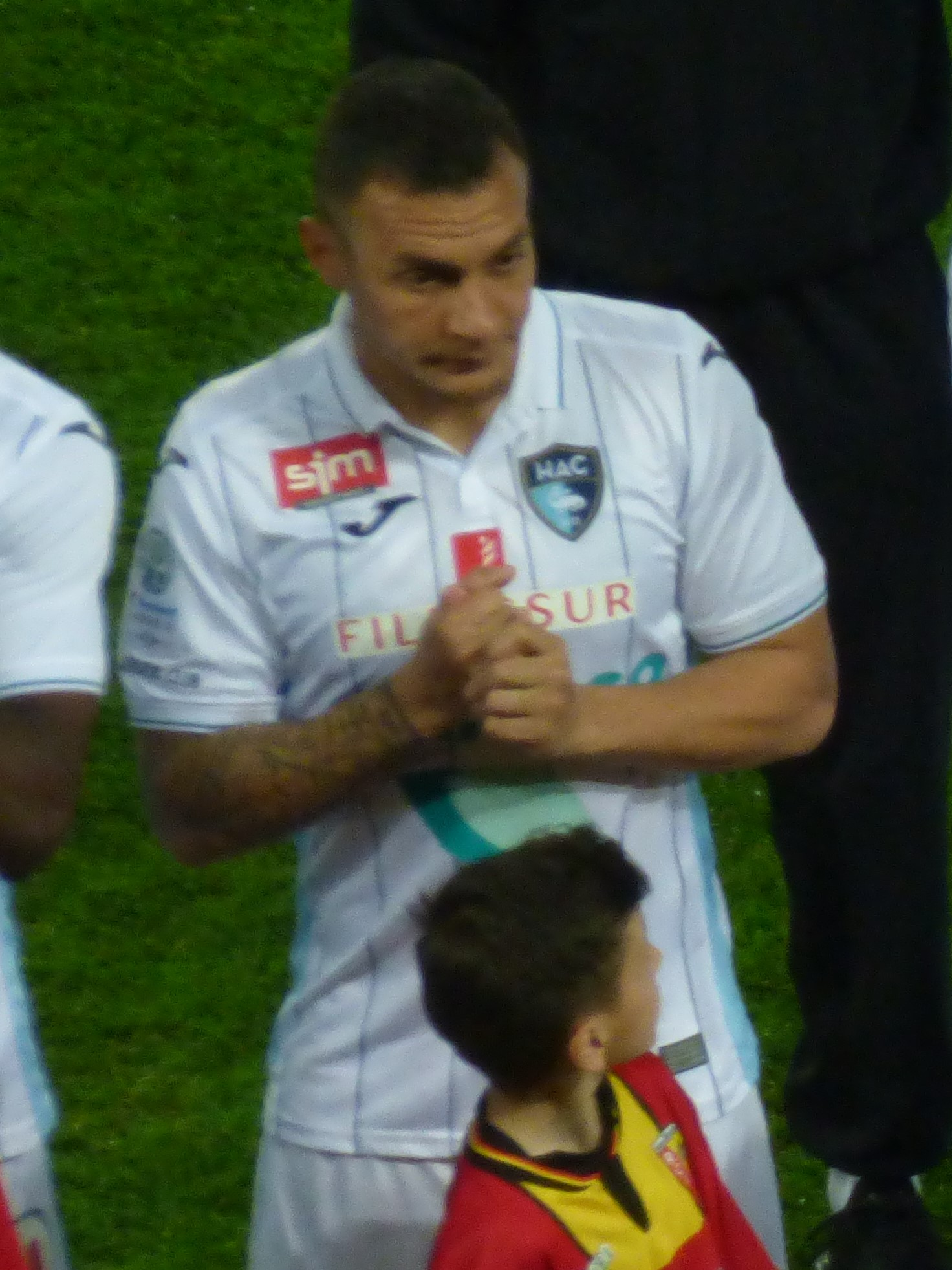
- Fontaine in 2019

Personal information
- Full name: Jean-Pascal Fontaine
- Date of birth: 11 September 1989 (age 37)
- Place of birth: Saint-Louis, Réunion
- Height: 1.75 m (5 ft 9 in)
- Position: Midfielder

Youth career
- 1996–2002: JS Saint-Pierroise
- 2002–2007: Le Havre

Senior career*
Years	Team	Apps	(Gls)
2010–2021	Le Havre II	25	(0)
2007–2022	Le Havre	346	(27)
2010	→ Beauvais (loan)	20	(4)

International career
2007–2008	France U-21	22	(1)
- * Club domestic league appearances and goals as of 14 May 2022

Jean-Pascal Fontaine (born 11 September 1989) is a French professional footballer who plays as a midfielder.

== Career ==
Fontaine was born in Saint-Louis, Réunion. In July 2002, he joined Le Havre from JS Saint-Pierroise. He played his first game for Le Havre against Nantes on 20 August 2007.

In constant progression, he was summoned by Erick Mombaerts in January 2009, coach of the French team football hopes for a detection course at Clairefontaine, and played during an opposition to the Paris Saint-Germain reserve (2-2).

Fontaine left Le Havre after 20 years at the club at the end of the 2021–22 season.

== Honours ==
Le Havre

- Ligue 2: 2007–08
