= Jamal Thiaré =

Senegalese footballer (born 1993)

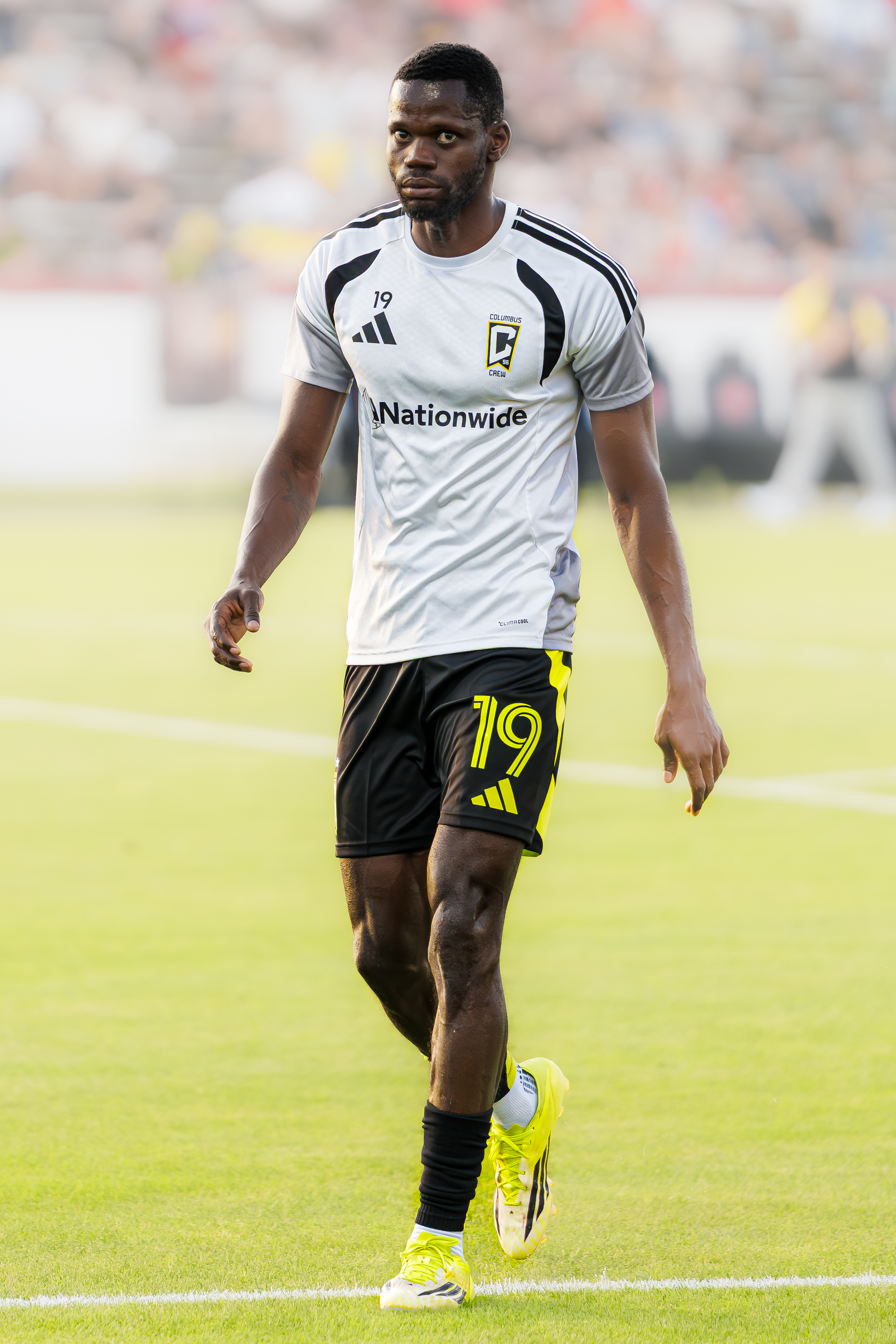
- Thiaré with Columbus Crew in 2026

Personal information
- Full name: Jamal Thiaré
- Date of birth: 31 March 1993 (age 33)
- Place of birth: Kaolack, Senegal
- Height: 1.81 m (5 ft 11 in)
- Position: Striker

Team information
- Current team: Columbus Crew
- Number: 19

Youth career
- –2009: ASC Saloum
- 2011–2013: CNEPS Excellence

Senior career*
Years	Team	Apps	(Gls)
- ASC Saloum
2013–2015	Charleroi	15	(1)
2014–2015	→ Avranches (loan)	7	(1)
2015–2018	Avranches	63	(24)
2016–2017	Avranches B	4	(3)
2018–2019	Le Havre B	3	(1)
2018–2023	Le Havre	121	(25)
2023–2025	Atlanta United	56	(11)
2026–	Columbus Crew	19	(2)
- * Club domestic league appearances and goals as of 8 November 2026

Jamal Thiaré (born 31 March 1993) is a Senegalese professional footballer who plays as a striker for Major League Soccer club Columbus Crew.

== Early life and career ==
After beginning to play football in his neighborhood, Jamal Thiaré joined ASC Saloum and made "a few appearances" in Senegal’s first division. He had a trial with Toulouse FC at age 17 and was close to signing a professional contract, but complications related to the Senegalese national team prevented the move, leaving him without competitive football for nearly two years. He eventually returned to the game through youth team CNEPS Excellence, and his performances there led to trials across Europe, including in Belgium, Switzerland, and Portugal, before he secured a loan move to Belgian club Royal Charleroi in January 2013. He made his debut for the club on 6 April against OH Leuven, drawing a penalty for his club. He scored his only goal for the club on 5 May, a 2–1 defeat in the play-off II to KV Mechelen. He was transferred permanently to Charleroi on 14 May 2013 on a three-year deal, with an additional two year option. After making 13 appearances in all competitions during his first full season with the club, Thiaré requested a loan move in order to get playing time. He was loaned to newly promoted French third tier side US Avranches for the 2014–15 season. Hampered by a sports hernia, Thiaré appeared in just seven matches in his first season in France. At the conclusion of the season, he was purchased by the French side. After several seasons with limited appearances for the club due to injury, he enjoyed a breakout campaign in the 2017–18 season, scoring 14 league goals and winning the Championnat National Golden Boot.

=== Le Havre AC ===
On 25 May 2018, Thiaré moved to Ligue 2 side Le Havre AC. During Thiaré's first season in Ligue 2, he was used mainly as a second-half substitute in league play, and was a starter during the cup competitions. He netted a brace in the first round of the Coup de la Ligue against Bourg Péronnas. He netted a further two braces in the seventh and eight rounds of the Coupe de France. During the 2019–20 season, he formed a prolific strike partnership with Tino Kadewere, recording eight goals and one assist before the season was suspended due to the COVID-19 pandemic. He scored eight league goals in the 2020–21 season, most notably scoring a brace against Guingamp. During the 2021–22 campaign, his season was disrupted by a serious knee injury.
