= 2021–22 ES Troyes AC season =

ES Troyes AC
2021–22 season
- Owner: City Football Group
- President: Daniel Masoni
- Head coach: Laurent Batlles (until 30 December); Bruno Irles (from 3 January)
- Stadium: Stade de l'Aube
- Ligue 1: 15th
- Coupe de France: Round of 64
- Top goalscorer: League: Xavier Chavalerin; Iké Ugbo (5 each); All: Xavier Chavalerin; Iké Ugbo (5 each)
Home colours	Away colours	Third colours

The 2021–22 season was the 36th season in the existence of ES Troyes AC and the club's first season back in the top flight of French football. In addition to the domestic league, Troyes participated in this season's edition of the Coupe de France.

== Players ==
=== First-team squad ===
As of 3 February 2022.

Note: Flags indicate national team as defined under FIFA eligibility rules; some limited exceptions apply. Players may hold more than one non-FIFA nationality.

No.	Pos.	Nation	Player
1	GK	FRA	Ryan Bouallak
2	DF	USA	Erik Palmer-Brown
3	DF	MLI	Youssouf Koné (on loan from Lyon)
4	DF	FRA	Giulian Biancone
5	MF	CMR	Tristan Dingomé
6	MF	MLI	Rominigue Kouamé
7	FW	TUN	Yoann Touzghar
9	FW	KOR	Suk Hyun-jun
10	MF	FRA	Florian Tardieu
11	FW	LUX	Gerson Rodrigues (on loan from Dynamo Kyiv)
12	DF	POR	Abdu Conté
13	FW	CAN	Iké Ugbo (on loan from Genk)
14	MF	FRA	Dylan Chambost
15	MF	FRA	Karim Azamoum
16	GK	FRA	Sébastien Renot

No.	Pos.	Nation	Player
17	DF	GUF	Yoann Salmier
18	MF	SRB	Luka Ilić
19	DF	MAR	Oualid El Hajjam
20	MF	FRA	Renaud Ripart
22	DF	ALG	Yasser Larouci
23	DF	FRA	Adil Rami
24	MF	FRA	Xavier Chavalerin
25	FW	GBS	Mama Baldé
26	FW	RSA	Lebo Mothiba (on loan from Strasbourg)
27	MF	FRA	Brandon Domingues
28	FW	MAR	Nassim Chadli
29	DF	BFA	Issa Kaboré (on loan from Manchester City)
30	GK	FRA	Gauthier Gallon
31	MF	BRA	Metinho
40	GK	FRA	Jessy Moulin

=== Other players under contract ===
Note: Flags indicate national team as defined under FIFA eligibility rules; some limited exceptions apply. Players may hold more than one non-FIFA nationality.

No.	Pos.	Nation	Player
—	DF	FRA	Benrandy Abdallah

=== On loan ===
Note: Flags indicate national team as defined under FIFA eligibility rules; some limited exceptions apply. Players may hold more than one non-FIFA nationality.

No.	Pos.	Nation	Player
—	DF	FRA	Mahamadou Dembélé (to Pau FC until 30 June 2022)
—	DF	FRA	Gabriel Mutombo (to Vilafranquense until 30 June 2022)
—	DF	FRA	Jimmy Giraudon (to Leganés until 30 June 2022)
—	MF	SLO	Enrik Ostrc (to Lommel until 30 June 2022)

No.	Pos.	Nation	Player
—	MF	POR	Rui Pires (to Paços de Ferreira until 30 June 2022)
—	FW	ENG	Levi Lumeka (to Vilafranquense until 30 June 2022)
—	FW	UKR	Mykola Kukharevych (to OH Leuven until 30 June 2022)

== Transfers ==
=== In ===
No.	Pos.	Nation	Player
3	DF	MLI	Youssouf Koné (on loan from Lyon, previously on loan at (Turkey) Hatayspor)
4	DF	FRA	Giulian Biancone (from Monaco, previously on loan at (Belgium) Cercle Brugge)
6	MF	MLI	Rominigue Kouamé (from Lille, previously on loan)
11	MF	BRA	Metinho (from (Brazil) Fluminense)
20	MF	FRA	Renaud Ripart (from Nîmes)
21	FW	UKR	Mykola Kukharevych (from (Ukraine) Rukh Lviv)
22	DF	ALG	Yasser Larouci (from (England) Liverpool)
25	FW	GBS	Mama Baldé (from Dijon)
28	FW	MAR	Nassim Chadli (from Nîmes B)
29	DF	BFA	Issa Kaboré (on loan from (England) Manchester City, previously on loan at (Belgium) Mechelen)
40	GK	FRA	Jessy Moulin (from Saint-Étienne)
—	DF	FRA	Adil Rami (from (Portugal) Boavista)
—	DF	NED	Philippe Sandler (on loan from (England) Manchester City)
—	MF	ENG	Patrick Roberts (on loan from (England) Manchester City, previously on loan at (England) Derby County)

=== Out ===
No.	Pos.	Nation	Player
3	MF	FRA	Kemelho Nguena (to (Bulgaria) Slavia Sofia)
11	FW	FRA	Lenny Pintor (loan return to Lyon)
15	MF	MAD	Rayan Raveloson (to (United States) LA Galaxy)
20	MF	POR	Rui Pires (on loan to (Portugal) Paços de Ferreira)
23	MF	COD	Stone Mambo (to Orléans)
24	FW	FRA	Alimami Gory (loan return to (Belgium) Cercle Brugge)
25	DF	FRA	Terence Baya (to (Denmark) Vendsyssel)
26	FW	CGO	Dylan Saint-Louis (to (Turkey) Hatayspor)
28	MF	FRA	Maxime Barthelmé (to Guingamp)
31	MF	BUL	Filip Krastev (loan return to (Belgium) Lommel)
39	FW	TUR	Umut Bozok (loan return to Lorient)
—	DF	FRA	Mahamadou Dembélé (reloan to Pau)

== Pre-season and friendlies ==
Win Draw Loss Fixtures

3 July 2021 Friendly	Troyes (France)	1–2	(France) Clermont	Le Chambon-sur-Lignon, France
17:00 CEST (UTC+2)	Suk 80'		Teixeira 35'; Allevinah 39'	Stadium: Stade Municipal

10 July 2021 Friendly	Troyes (France)	2–2	(France) Nîmes	France
17:15 CEST (UTC+2)

17 July 2021 Friendly	Dijon (France)	1–2	(France) Troyes	Dijon, France
17:00 CEST (UTC+2)				Stadium: Stade Gaston Gérard

24 July 2021 Friendly	Angers (France)	3–0	(France) Troyes	Romorantin, France
17:00 CEST (UTC+2)	Bahoken 34'; Cho 42', 45'			Stadium: Stade Jules Ladoumègue

28 July 2021 Friendly	Troyes (France)	1–2	(France) Metz	Homécourt, France
17:30 CEST (UTC+2)	Kukharevych 7'; Bombo (red card) 42'		Niane 10'; Joseph 49'	Stadium: Complexe Sportif d’Homécourt

31 July 2021 Friendly	Troyes (France)	1–1	(France) Bordeaux	Troyes, France
19:00 CEST (UTC+2)	Tardieu 64'		Mexer (yellow card) 59' (yellow-red card) 73'; Koscielny (yellow card) 63'; Briand 90'	Stadium: Stade de l'Aube

31 July 2021 Friendly	Troyes (France)	Cancelled	(England) Manchester City	Troyes, France
21:00 CEST (UTC+2)
Note: The match was cancelled on 21 July 2021 due to new COVID-19 quarantine restrictions on travelers to and from France.

== Competitions ==
=== Overall record ===
Competition	First match	Last match	Starting round	Final position	Record							
Competition	First match	Last match	Starting round	Final position	Pld	W	D	L	GF	GA	GD	Win %
Ligue 1	7 August 2021	21 May 2022	Matchday 1	15th	38	9	11	18	37	53	−16	23.68
Coupe de France	18 December 2021		Round of 64	Round of 64	1	0	1	0	1	1	+0	0.00
Total					39	9	12	18	38	54	−16	23.08

Source: Soccerway

=== Ligue 1 ===
==== League table ====
Pos	Team	Pld	W	D	L	GF	GA	GD	Pts
13	Montpellier	38	12	7	19	49	61	−12	43
14	Angers	38	10	11	17	44	55	−11	41
15	Troyes	38	9	11	18	37	53	−16	38
16	Lorient	38	8	12	18	35	63	−28	36
17	Clermont	38	9	9	20	38	69	−31	36

Source: Ligue 1
Rules for classification: 1) Points; 2) Goal difference; 3) Head-to-head points; 4) Head-to-head goal difference; 5) Head-to-head goals scored; 6) Head-to-head away goals scored; 7) Goals scored; 8) Away goals scored; 9) Fair-play points (Note: Head-to-head record is used only after all the matches between the teams in question have been played).

==== Results summary ====
Overall								Home						Away					
Pld	W	D	L	GF	GA	GD	Pts	W	D	L	GF	GA	GD	W	D	L	GF	GA	GD
38	9	11	18	37	53	−16	38	5	7	7	19	19	0	4	4	11	18	34	−16

Source: Ligue 1

==== Results by round ====
Round	1	2	3	4	5	6	7	8	9	10	11	12	13	14	15	16	17	18	19	20	21	22	23	24	25	26	27	28	29	30	31	32	33	34	35	36	37	38
Ground	H	A	A	H	A	H	A	H	A	H	A	H	A	H	A	H	A	H	H	A	H	A	H	A	A	H	A	H	A	H	A	H	H	A	H	A	H	A
Result	L	L	D	L	W	D	L	D	L	W	W	D	L	L	L	W	L	L	D	W	L	L	D	L	L	D	W	W	D	W	L	D	L	L	W	D	L	D
Position	18	19	18	20	13	13	17	17	17	16	15	14	14	17	17	15	15	17	15	16	15	16	16	16	17	17	16	15	15	15	15	15	16	16	14	15	15	15

Source: Ligue 1
A = Away; H = Home; W = Win; D = Draw; L = Loss

==== Matches ====
The league fixtures were announced on 25 June 2021.

7 August 2021 1	Troyes	1–2	Paris Saint-Germain	Troyes
21:00 CEST (UTC+2)	El Hajjam 9'; Koné (yellow card) 90'	Report	Hakimi 19', (yellow card) 45'; Icardi 21', (yellow card) 70'; Kimpembe (yellow card) 33'; Sarabia (yellow card) 90+2'	Stadium: Stade de l'Aube; Attendance: 15,248; Referee: Amaury Delerue

15 August 2021 2	Clermont	2–0	Troyes	Clermont-Ferrand
15:00 CEST (UTC+2)	Mendy (yellow card) 45+1'; Bayo 53', 65'	Report	Kabore (yellow card) 19' (yellow-red card) 33'; Biancone (yellow card) 35'	Stadium: Stade Gabriel Montpied; Attendance: 11,005; Referee: Romain Lissorgue

22 August 2021 3	Strasbourg	1–1	Troyes	Strasbourg
15:00 CEST (UTC+2)	Fila (yellow card) 39'; Perrin (yellow card) 43'; Waris (yellow card) 75'; Thomasson 77'	Report	Touzghar 19'; Biancone (yellow card) 35'	Stadium: Stade de la Meinau; Attendance: 22,185; Referee: Jérôme Brisard

29 August 2021 4	Troyes	1–2	Monaco	Troyes
13:00 CEST (UTC+2)	Aguilar 51' (o.g.); El Hajjam (yellow card) 68'	Report	Maripán (yellow card) 28'; Diop 40', 58'; Tchouaméni (yellow card) 48'	Stadium: Stade de l'Aube; Attendance: 9,866; Referee: Johan Hamel

12 September 2021 5	Metz	0–2	Troyes	Metz
15:00 CEST (UTC+2)	Maïga (yellow card) 33'; De Préville (yellow card) 63'	Report	Rodrigues 50'; Azamoum (yellow card) 57'; Chavalerin 84'	Stadium: Stade Saint-Symphorien; Attendance: 15,269; Referee: Pierre Gaillouste

19 September 2021 6	Troyes	1–1	Montpellier	Troyes
15:00 CEST (UTC+2)	Touzghar 37'; Dingomé (yellow card) 44'; Banhie-Zoukrou (yellow card) 71'; Chavalerin (yellow card) 81'; Rodrigues (yellow card) 90+1'	Report	Thuler (yellow card) 23' (yellow-red card) 79'; Ferri (yellow card) 49'; Savanier (yellow card) 51', (goal) 87'	Stadium: Stade de l'Aube; Attendance: 7,405; Referee: Florent Batta

22 September 2021 7	Lyon	3–1	Troyes	Décines-Charpieu
21:00 CEST (UTC+2)	Shaqiri 48'; Emerson 72'; Paquetá 87', (yellow card) 90+2'	Report	Azamoum (yellow card) 15'; Giraudon (yellow card) 28'; Chavalerin 45'; Biancone (yellow card) 63'	Stadium: Parc Olympique Lyonnais; Attendance: 29,714; Referee: Stéphanie Frappart

26 September 2021 8	Troyes	1–1	Angers	Troyes
15:00 CEST (UTC+2)	Chavalerin (yellow card) 8'; Rodrigues (yellow card) 20'; Baldé 22'; Giraudon (yellow card) 63' (yellow-red card) 90+2'	Report	Cho (yellow card) 1'; Mangani 65' (pen.); Boufal (yellow card) 80'	Stadium: Stade de l'Aube; Attendance: 6,868; Referee: Thomas Léonard

3 October 2021 9	Nantes	2–0	Troyes	Nantes
15:00 CEST (UTC+2)	Castelletto (yellow card) 45+1'; Girotto 58'; Blas 69' (pen.); Chirivella (yellow card) 90+1'	Report	Rodrigues (yellow card) 66'; Chadli (yellow card) 83'	Stadium: Stade de la Beaujoire; Attendance: 15,150; Referee: Jérôme Brisard

17 October 2021 10	Troyes	1–0	Nice	Troyes
13:00 CEST (UTC+2)	Baldé 4'; Kouamé (yellow card) 36'; Biancone (yellow card) 73'	Report	Claude-Maurice (yellow card) 80'	Stadium: Stade de l'Aube; Attendance: 7,925; Referee: Johan Hamel

24 October 2021 11	Reims	1–2	Troyes	Reims
15:00 CEST (UTC+2)	Abdelhamid 6'; Flips (yellow card) 32'; Gravillon (yellow card) 44' (yellow-red card) 90+3'; Matusiwa (yellow card) 86'	Report	Kaboré (yellow card) 9'; Baldé 41'; Chavalerin 66'; Gallon (yellow card) 76'	Stadium: Stade Auguste Delaune; Attendance: 12,326; Referee: Pierre Gaillouste

31 October 2021 12	Troyes	2–2	Rennes	Troyes
15:00 CET (UTC+1)	Rami 38'; Dingomé 40'	Report	Aguerd 9'; Kamaldeen (yellow card) 30'; Terrier 81'	Stadium: Stade de l'Aube; Attendance: 8,550; Referee: Jérémy Stinat

5 November 2021 13	Lens	4–0	Troyes	Lens
21:00 CET (UTC+1)	Kalimuendo 14'; Saïd 29'; Clauss 35'; Frankowski 61'; Ganago (yellow card) 69'	Report	Rodrigues (yellow card) 74'	Stadium: Stade Bollaert-Delelis; Attendance: 35,706; Referee: Thomas Léonard

21 November 2021 14	Troyes	0–1	Saint-Étienne	Troyes
15:00 CET (UTC+1)	Salmier (yellow card) 21'	Report	Aouchiche (yellow card) 36'; Youssouf (yellow card) 48'; Trauco 60'; Nadé (yellow card) 75'; Green (yellow card) 90+1'	Stadium: Stade de l'Aube; Attendance: 10,644; Referee: Florent Batta

28 November 2021 15	Marseille	1–0	Troyes	Marseille
20:45 CET (UTC+1)	Gueye (yellow card) 16'; Lirola 74'	Report	Salmier (yellow card) 10'; Tardieu (yellow card) 17'; Koné (yellow card) 43'; Rodrigues (yellow card) 59'	Stadium: Stade Vélodrome; Attendance: 0 Referee: Jérémie Pignard

1 December 2021 16	Troyes	2–0	Lorient	Troyes
19:00 CET (UTC+1)	Ripart 7'; Kouamé 34'; Kaboré (yellow card) 63'	Report	Diarra (yellow card) 83'	Stadium: Stade de l'Aube; Attendance: 6,506; Referee: Jérémy Stinat

4 December 2021 17	Lille	2–1	Troyes	Villeneuve-d'Ascq
19:00 CET (UTC+1)	Xeka (yellow card) 41'; David 48'; Yılmaz (yellow card) 66'; Giraudon 85' (o.g.); Onana (yellow card) 88'	Report	Dingomé 6', (yellow card) 59'; Kouamé (yellow card) 22'; Giraudon (yellow card) 33'; Salmier (yellow card) 33'	Stadium: Stade Pierre-Mauroy; Attendance: 28,286; Referee: Benoît Bastien

12 December 2021 18	Troyes	1–2	Bordeaux	Troyes
15:00 CET (UTC+1)	Chavalerin 28'; Tardieu (yellow card) 35'; El Hajjam (yellow card) 57'; Biancone (yellow card) 90+6'	Report	Salmier 30' (o.g.); Hwang Ui-jo 54'; Fransérgio (yellow card) 66'; Lacoux (yellow card) 86'; Briand (yellow card) 90+6'	Stadium: Stade de l'Aube; Attendance: 7,950; Referee: Romain Lissorgue

22 December 2021 19	Troyes	1–1	Brest	Troyes
21:00 CET (UTC+1)	Kaboré (yellow card) 13'; Moulin (yellow card) 13' (yellow-red card) 13'; Rami 80'	Report	Honorat 5'; Hérelle (yellow card) 22'; Mounié (yellow card) 54'	Stadium: Stade de l'Aube; Attendance: 6,872; Referee: Johan Hamel

16 January 2022 21	Troyes	0–1	Lyon	Troyes
17:05 CET (UTC+1)	Rodrigues (yellow card) 45+4'; Giraudon (yellow card) 65'	Report	Dembélé 33' (pen.); Gusto (yellow card) 86'	Stadium: Stade de l'Aube; Attendance: 4,224; Referee: Jérôme Brisard

19 January 2022 20	Montpellier	0–1	Troyes	Montpellier
19:00 CET (UTC+1)	Mollet (yellow card) 39'; Souquet (yellow card) 58'; Savanier (red card) 63'; Chotard (yellow card) 66'; Mavididi (yellow card) 68'; Ferri (yellow card) 87'	Report	Biancone (yellow card) 21'; Chavalerin 74'	Stadium: Stade de la Mosson; Attendance: 4,943; Referee: Jérémy Stinat

23 January 2022 22	Angers	2–1	Troyes	Angers
15:00 CET (UTC+1)	Mangani 26' (pen.), 37' (pen.); Taïbi (yellow card) 88'	Report	Domingues 10'; Biancone (yellow card) 37'; Salmier (yellow card) 56'; Gallon (yellow card) 89'	Stadium: Stade Raymond Kopa; Attendance: 5,000; Referee: Romain Lissorgue

6 February 2022 23	Troyes	0–0	Metz	Troyes
15:00 CET (UTC+1)	Kouamé (yellow card) 45'	Report	Amadou (yellow card) 40'; Traoré (yellow card) 42'	Stadium: Stade de l'Aube; Attendance: 7,227; Referee: Pierre Gaillouste

13 February 2022 24	Brest	5–1	Troyes	Brest
15:00 CET (UTC+1)	Satriano 7', 27'; Agoumé (yellow card) 15'; Honorat 49', 67'; Mounié 82'	Report	Tardieu (yellow card) 43'; Rami 45'	Stadium: Stade Francis-Le Blé; Attendance: 10,600; Referee: Florent Batta

20 February 2022 25	Rennes	4–1	Troyes	Rennes
15:00 CET (UTC+1)	Guirassy (yellow card) 12', (goal) 14', 20'; Terrier 75'; Laborde 87' (pen.)	Report	Ugbo 39'; Chavalerin (yellow card) 49'; Tardieu (yellow card) 53'; Salmier (yellow card) 85'; Kaboré (yellow card) 90+1'	Stadium: Roazhon Park; Attendance: 22,967; Referee: Clément Turpin

27 February 2022 26	Troyes	1–1	Marseille	Troyes
17:05 CET (UTC+1)	Baldé (yellow card) 27'; Tardieu (yellow card) 36'; Rami (yellow card) 36'; Conté (yellow card) 49'; Touzghar 90'; Biancone (yellow card) 90+6'	Report	Rongier (yellow card) 11'; Payet 28' (pen.), (yellow card) 55'; López (yellow card) 86'	Stadium: Stade de l'Aube; Attendance: 16,871; Referee: François Letexier

6 March 2022 27	Bordeaux	0–2	Troyes	Bordeaux
15:00 CET (UTC+1)	Marcelo (yellow card) 8'; Gregersen (yellow card) 45+1'; Niang (yellow card) 69'; Ahmedhodžić (yellow card) 75'; Poussin (yellow card) 87'; Oudin (yellow card) 90+3'	Report	Baldé (penalty missed) 28'; Poussin 28' (o.g.); Biancone (yellow card) 47'; Mothiba 87' (pen.); Koné (red card) 90+1'	Stadium: Matmut Atlantique; Attendance: 20,287; Referee: Ruddy Buquet

12 March 2022 28	Troyes	1–0	Nantes	Troyes
21:00 CET (UTC+1)	Ugbo 43'; Conté (yellow card) 47'	Report	Simon (yellow card) 63'	Stadium: Stade de l'Aube; Attendance: 7,400; Referee: Stéphanie Frappart

18 March 2022 29	Saint-Étienne	1–1	Troyes	Saint-Étienne
21:00 CET (UTC+1)	Mangala (yellow card) 62'; Boudebouz 67' (pen.); Khazri (yellow card) 69'	Report	Mothiba 18'; Palmer-Brown (yellow card) 65'; Chavalerin (yellow card) 65'	Stadium: Stade Geoffroy-Guichard; Attendance: 32,193; Referee: Romain Lissorgue

3 April 2022 30	Troyes	1–0	Reims	Troyes
15:00 CEST (UTC+2)	Palmer-Brown (yellow card) 74'; Ripart 90+3'	Report	Abdelhamid (yellow card) 9'; Matusiwa (yellow card) 35' (yellow-red card) 54'; Busi (yellow card) 80'	Stadium: Stade de l'Aube; Attendance: 9,402; Referee: Ruddy Buquet

10 April 2022 31	Monaco	2–1	Troyes	Monaco
15:00 CEST (UTC+2)	Caio 18'; Aguilar (yellow card) 22'; Volland 57'; Ben Yedder (yellow card) 71'	Report	Ugbo 39'; Biancone (yellow card) 72'; Kouamé (yellow card) 81'	Stadium: Stade Louis II; Attendance: 4,786; Referee: Mikael Lesage

17 April 2022 32	Troyes	1–1	Strasbourg	Troyes
15:00 CEST (UTC+2)	Tardieu 85' (pen.)	Report	Djiku (yellow card) 45'; Diallo 56' (pen.); Diarra (yellow card) 61'	Stadium: Stade de l'Aube; Attendance: 10,000; Referee: Benoît Millot

20 April 2022 33	Troyes	0–1	Clermont	Troyes
19:00 CEST (UTC+2)	Mothiba (yellow card) 4'; Kaboré (yellow card) 61'; Baldé (red card) 85'; Moulin (yellow card) 90+4'	Report	Seidu (yellow card) 37' (yellow-red card) 70'; Billong (yellow card) 48'; Bayo (yellow card) 63', (goal) 88'; Dossou (yellow card) 70'; Djoco (yellow card) 76'	Stadium: Stade de l'Aube; Attendance: 8,124; Referee: Jérémie Pignard

24 April 2022 34	Nice	1–0	Troyes	Nice
15:00 CEST (UTC+2)	Thuram 90+3'; Lotomba (yellow card) 90+4'	Report	Tardieu (yellow card) 90+4'	Stadium: Allianz Riviera; Attendance: 17,065; Referee: Hakim Ben El Hadj

1 May 2022 35	Troyes	3–0	Lille	Troyes
13:00 CEST (UTC+2)	Tardieu 43' (pen.), 86' (pen.); Ugbo 55' (pen.)	Report	Sanches (yellow card) 50' (yellow-red card) 50'; Botman (yellow card) 54'; Gudmundsson (yellow card) 61'; Yılmaz (red card) 68'	Stadium: Stade de l'Aube; Attendance: 10,497; Referee: Willy Delajod

8 May 2022 36	Paris Saint-Germain	2–2	Troyes	Paris
20:45 CEST (UTC+2)	Marquinhos 6'; Neymar 25' (pen.), (yellow card) 66'	Report	Ugbo 30'; Tardieu 49' (pen.); Ripart (yellow card) 66'; Kouamé (yellow card) 82'	Stadium: Parc des Princes; Attendance: 47,854; Referee: Jérôme Brisard

14 May 2022 37	Troyes	1–3	Lens	Troyes
21:00 CEST (UTC+2)	Kaboré (yellow card) 9'; Biancone 14'	Report	Medina (yellow card) 19'; Danso 42'; Kalimuendo 45'; Clauss 71'; Frankowski (yellow card) 78'	Stadium: Stade de l'Aube; Attendance: 18,643; Referee: François Letexier

21 May 2022 38	Lorient	1–1	Troyes	Lorient
21:00 CEST (UTC+2)	Monconduit (yellow card) 59'; Laurienté 74', (yellow card) 90'	Report	Touzghar 22'; Ripart (yellow card) 64'; Larouci (yellow card) 78'; Kaboré (red card) 85'	Stadium: Stade du Moustoir; Attendance: 15,131; Referee: Johan Hamel

=== Coupe de France ===
18 December 2021 Round of 64	Troyes	1–1 (2–4 p)	Nancy	Troyes
13:45 CET (UTC+1)	Palmer-Brown (yellow card) 37'; Domingues 44' (pen.); Koné (yellow card) 45+3'; Mazou-Sacko (yellow card) 52'; Kaboré (yellow card) 82'; Biancone (yellow card) 90+5'; Rami (yellow card) 90+5'	Report	Karamoko (yellow card) 7' (yellow-red card) 90+5'; Nonnenmacher (yellow card) 29' (yellow-red card) 32'; Akichi (yellow card) 42'; Jung 64'; Ciss (red card) 76'	Stadium: Stade de l'Aube; Attendance: 2,916; Referee: Willy Delajod
	Penalties
	Rami (penalty scored); Suk Hyun-jun (penalty missed); Domingues (penalty scored); Larouci (penalty missed)		(penalty scored) Jung; (penalty scored) El Aynaoui; (penalty scored) Haag; (penalty scored) Bondo

== Statistics ==
=== Goalscorers ===
As of 29 August 2021

Rank	No.	Pos.	Nat.	Name	Ligue 1	Coupe de France	Total
1	14	FW	(Tunisia)	Yoann Touzghar	1	0	1
1	19	DF	(Morocco)	Oualid El Hajjam	1	0	1
Own goals					1	0	1
Totals					3	0	3
