= 2020–21 ES Troyes AC season =

Troyes AC
2020–21 season
- Chairman: Daniel Masoni
- Manager: Laurent Batlles
- Stadium: Stade de l'Aube
- Ligue 2: 1st (promoted)
- Coupe de France: Eighth round
- Top goalscorer: League: Yoann Touzghar (16); All: Yoann Touzghar (16)
Home colours	Away colours

The 2020–21 Troyes AC season was the club's 35th season in existence and the third consecutive season in the second flight of French football. In addition to the domestic league, Troyes participated in this season's edition of the Coupe de France. The season covered the period from 1 July 2020 to 30 June 2021.

== Players ==
=== First-team squad ===
As of 28 January 2021.

Note: Flags indicate national team as defined under FIFA eligibility rules; some limited exceptions apply. Players may hold more than one non-FIFA nationality.

No.	Pos.	Nation	Player
1	GK	FRA	Ryan Bouallak
4	DF	FRA	Mahamadou Dembélé
6	MF	MLI	Rominigue Kouamé (on loan from Lille)
7	FW	TUN	Yoann Touzghar
8	DF	FRA	Jimmy Giraudon (captain)
9	FW	KOR	Suk Hyun-jun
10	MF	FRA	Florian Tardieu
11	FW	FRA	Lenny Pintor (on loan from Lyon)
12	FW	ENG	Levi Lumeka
13	DF	FRA	Gabriel Mutombo
14	MF	FRA	Dylan Chambost
15	MF	MAD	Rayan Raveloson
16	GK	FRA	Sébastien Renot
17	DF	GUF	Yoann Salmier

No.	Pos.	Nation	Player
18	MF	FRA	Calvin Bombo
19	DF	MAR	Oualid El Hajjam
20	MF	POR	Rui Pires
21	MF	FRA	Eden Massouema
23	MF	COD	Stone Mambo
25	DF	FRA	Terence Baya
26	FW	CGO	Dylan Saint-Louis
27	MF	FRA	Brandon Domingues
28	MF	FRA	Maxime Barthelmé
29	FW	SEN	Pape Meïssa Ba
30	GK	FRA	Gauthier Gallon
31	MF	BUL	Filip Krastev (on loan from Lommel)
32	FW	FRA	Adel Berkane
39	FW	TUR	Umut Bozok (on loan from Lorient)

== Pre-season and friendlies ==
Win Draw Loss

9 July 2020 Friendly	Reims (France)	3–1	(France) Troyes	Bétheny, France
17:00 CEST (UTC+2)	Zeneli 12'; Touré 43'; Hornby 60'		Camara 75'	Stadium: Stade Louis Blériot N°1

25 July 2020 Friendly	Clermont (France)	0–0	(France) Troyes	Clermont-Ferrand, France
18:00 CEST (UTC+2)				Stadium: Stade Municipal

28 July 2020 Friendly	Saint-Étienne (France)	Cancelled	(France) Troyes	Saint-Étienne, France
--:-- CEST (UTC+2)

29 July 2020 Friendly	Le Puy Foot 43 (France)	0–3	(France) Troyes	Le Puy-en-Velay, France
17:00 CEST (UTC+2)			Giraudon 10' (pen.); Karamoko 42'; Saint-Louis 66'	Stadium: Stade Charles Massot 2

1 August 2020 Friendly	Auxerre (France)	Cancelled	(France) Troyes	TBD, France
10:00 CEST (UTC+2)

1 August 2020 Friendly	FC Villefranche (France)	0–2	(France) Troyes	Villefranche-sur-Saône, France
18:00 CEST (UTC+2)			Barthelmé 7', 44'	Stadium: Stade Armand Chouffet

8 August 2020 Friendly	Paris FC (France)	2–1	(France) Troyes	Orly, France
18:00 CEST (UTC+2)	López 48'; Gakpa 70'		Tardieu 11' (pen.)	Stadium: Centre d'entrainement Paris FC

12 August 2020 Friendly	Troyes (France)	3–1	(France) Sedan	Troyes, France
18:00 CEST (UTC+2)	Touzghar 54', 55'; Lumeka 86'		Samb 75'	Stadium: Stade de l'Aube

15 August 2020 Friendly	Amiens (France)	1–2	(France) Troyes	Amiens, France
19:00 CEST (UTC+2)	Ghoddos 60'; Gomis (red card) 62'		Barthelmé 10'; Touzghar 54'	Stadium: Stade de la Licorne; Referee: Benjamin Lepaysant

== Competitions ==
=== Overview ===
Competition	First match	Last match	Starting round	Final position	Record							
Competition	First match	Last match	Starting round	Final position	Pld	W	D	L	GF	GA	GD	Win %
Ligue 2	24 August 2020	23 May 2021	Matchday 1	Winners	38	23	8	7	60	36	+24	60.53
Coupe de France	19 January 2021		Eighth round	Eighth round	1	0	0	1	0	1	−1	0.00
Total					39	23	8	8	60	37	+23	58.97

Source: Soccerway

=== Ligue 2 ===
==== League table ====
Pos	Team	Pld	W	D	L	GF	GA	GD	Pts	Promotion or Relegation
1	Troyes (C, P)	38	23	8	7	60	36	+24	77	Promotion to Ligue 1
2	Clermont (P)	38	21	9	8	61	25	+36	72	Promotion to Ligue 1
3	Toulouse	38	20	10	8	71	42	+29	70	Qualification to promotion play-offs
4	Grenoble	38	18	11	9	51	35	+16	65	Qualification to promotion play-offs
5	Paris FC	38	17	13	8	53	37	+16	64	Qualification to promotion play-offs

Source: Ligue 2
Rules for classification: 1) Points; 2) Goal difference; 3) Number of goals scored; 4) Head-to-head goal difference; 5) Fair play points
(C) Champions; (P) Promoted

==== Results summary ====
Overall								Home						Away					
Pld	W	D	L	GF	GA	GD	Pts	W	D	L	GF	GA	GD	W	D	L	GF	GA	GD
38	23	8	7	60	36	+24	77	15	3	1	32	15	+17	8	5	6	28	21	+7

Source: Ligue 2

==== Results by round ====
Round	1	2	3	4	5	6	7	8	9	10	11	12	13	14	15	16	17	18	19	20	21	22	23	24	25	26	27	28	29	30	31	32	33	34	35	36	37	38
Ground	H	A	H	A	H	A	A	H	A	H	H	A	H	A	A	H	A	H	A	H	A	H	A	H	H	A	H	A	H	A	H	A	H	A	H	A	H	A
Result	W	L	W	L	W	D	W	D	W	D	W	W	W	D	W	W	L	W	D	W	W	W	L	D	W	D	W	W	L	L	W	D	W	W	W	W	W	L
Position	4	9	5	7	5	6	4	2	2	2	5	3	3	1	1	1	2	1	1	1	1	1	1	1	1	1	1	1	1	1	1	1	1	1	1	1	1	1

Source: Ligue 2
A = Away; H = Home; W = Win; D = Draw; L = Loss

==== Matches ====
The league fixtures were announced on 9 July 2020.

24 August 2020 1	Troyes	2–0	Le Havre	Troyes
20:45 CEST (UTC+2)	Salmier (yellow card) 32'; Lumeka 78', 90+1'	Report	Fontaine (yellow card) 3' (yellow-red card) 61'; Ersoy (red card) 53'	Stadium: Stade de l'Aube; Referee: Antony Gautier

29 August 2020 2	Sochaux	2–1	Troyes	Montbéliard
19:00 CEST (UTC+2)	Lopy 29'; Weissbeck 84'	Report	Ba 90'	Stadium: Stade Auguste Bonal; Referee: Mikael Lesage

12 September 2020 3	Troyes	2–0	Pau	Troyes
19:00 CEST (UTC+2)	Suk 37' (pen.); Pintor 87'	Report		Stadium: Stade de l'Aube; Referee: Gaël Angoula

21 September 2020 4	Auxerre	2–1	Troyes	Auxerre
20:45 CEST (UTC+2)	Ngando 37'; Le Bihan 58'	Report	Touzghar 90+1'	Stadium: Stade de l'Abbé-Deschamps; Referee: Olivier Thual

28 September 2020 5	Troyes	1–0	Clermont	Troyes
20:45 CEST (UTC+2)	Kouamé 13'	Report		Stadium: Stade de l'Aube; Referee: Arnaud Baert

3 October 2020 6	Toulouse	0–0	Troyes	Toulouse
15:00 CEST (UTC+2)		Report		Stadium: Stadium de Toulouse; Attendance: 0 Referee: Rémi Landry

17 October 2020 7	Rodez	0–1	Troyes	Rodez
19:00 CEST (UTC+2)	Guivarch (yellow card) 90+1'	Report	Mambo (yellow card) 10'; Chambost (yellow card) 89'; Touzghar 90+2' (pen.)	Stadium: Stade Paul-Lignon; Attendance: 1,791; Referee: (France) Benjamin Lepaysant

24 October 2020 8	Troyes	1–1	Valenciennes	Troyes
19:00 CEST (UTC+2)	Salmier (red card) 3'; Gallon (yellow card) 7'; Touzghar 16'; Chambost (yellow card) 33'; Ba (yellow card) 87'	Report	Chevalier 8' (pen.); Fedele (yellow card) 40'	Stadium: Stade de l'Aube; Attendance: 0 Referee: (France) Abdelatif Kherradji

31 October 2020 9	Ajaccio	0–4	Troyes	Ajaccio
19:00 CET (UTC+1)	Keita (yellow card) 88'	Report	Saint-Louis 22'; Touzghar 49'; Baya 63'; Domingues 83' (yellow card) 90+3'	Stadium: Stade François Coty; Attendance: 0 Referee: (France) Thomas Leonard

7 November 2020 10	Troyes	2–2	Chambly	Troyes
19:00 CET (UTC+1)	Gory 2'; Touzghar 44'; El Hajjam (yellow card) 66'; Tardieu (yellow card) 73'; Barthelmé (yellow card) 85'	Report	Correa 25' (yellow card) 73'; David (yellow card) 32'; Pontdemé (red card) 54'; Doucouré 81'; Heinry (yellow card) 88'	Stadium: Stade de l'Aube; Attendance: 0 Referee: (France) Alexandre Perreau Niel

28 November 2020 11	Troyes	2–1	Amiens SC	Troyes
19:00 CET (UTC+1)	Touzghar 12'; Saint-Louis 44'; Chambost (yellow card) 62'; Gallon (yellow card) 78'	Report	Mendoza (yellow card) 28' (goal) 80' (pen.); Monzango (yellow card) 45+1'; Lusamba (red card) 90'	Stadium: Stade de l'Aube; Attendance: 0 Referee: (France) Romain Delpech

1 December 2020 12	Guingamp	1–2	Troyes	Guingamp
19:00 CET (UTC+1)	Niakaté (yellow card) 25'; Valdivia (yellow card) 45+2'; Rodelin 53'	Report	Touzghar 18'; Salmier (yellow card) 23'; Barthelmé (yellow card) 27'; Ba 77'; Rui Pires (yellow card) 90+4'	Stadium: Stade de Roudourou; Attendance: 0 Referee: (France) Sylvain Palhies

5 December 2020 13	Troyes	2–1	Paris FC	Troyes
15:00 CET (UTC+1)	Chambost 31'; Saint-Louis 43'; Giraudon (yellow card) 90+5'	Report	Name 66'; Belaud (yellow card) 89'; Abdi (yellow card) 90+7'; Hanin (yellow card) 90+8'	Stadium: Stade de l'Aube; Attendance: 0 Referee: (France) Benjamin Lepaysant

12 December 2020 14	Caen	0–0	Troyes	Caen
15:00 CET (UTC+1)	Armougom (yellow card) 25'	Report	Touzghar (yellow card) 18'; Tardieu (yellow card) 60'	Stadium: Stade Michel d'Ornano; Attendance: 0 Referee: (France) Bartolomeu Varela

15 December 2020 15	Nancy	2–3	Troyes	Nancy
20:00 CET (UTC+1)	Bassi 5'; Ciss 21' (yellow card) 28'	Report	Gory 15' (yellow card) 22'; Touzghar 27'; Seka 45+3' (o.g.); Tardieu (yellow card) 84'	Stadium: Stade Marcel Picot; Attendance: 0 Referee: (France) Remi Landry

18 December 2020 16	Troyes	1–0	Niort	Troyes
20:00 CET (UTC+1)	Suk Hyun-jun 52' (yellow card) 67'	Report	Joseph Mendes (yellow card) 35'; Conté (yellow card) 45'; Benhattab (yellow card) 89'	Stadium: Stade de l'Aube; Attendance: 0 Referee: (France) Aurélien Petit

22 December 2020 17	Grenoble	2–0	Troyes	Grenoble
20:00 CET (UTC+1)	Nestor (yellow card) 39'; Pickel (yellow card) 62'; Diallo 72'; Bénet 76' (pen.)	Report	El Hajjam (yellow card) 43'; Mutombo (red card) 58'; Kouamé (yellow card) 75'; Giraudon (yellow card) 88'	Stadium: Stade des Alpes; Attendance: 0 Referee: (France) Pierre Gaillouste

5 January 2021 18	Troyes	2–0	Châteauroux	Troyes
20:00 CET (UTC+1)	Gory (yellow card) 53'; Cissé 77' (o.g.); Pintor 84'	Report	Cissé (yellow card) 45'; Cordoval (yellow card) 61' (yellow-red card) 80'	Stadium: Stade de l'Aube; Attendance: 0 Referee: (France) Guillaume Paradis

8 January 2021 19	Dunkerque	0–0	Troyes	Dunkerque
20:00 CET (UTC+1)	Kerrouche (yellow card) 46'; Tchokounté (yellow card) 56'; A. Gomis (yellow card) 74'; Huysman (yellow card) 89'	Report	Raveloson (yellow card) 35'	Stadium: Stade Marcel-Tribut; Referee: Alexandre Perreau Niel

16 January 2021 20	Troyes	2–1	Sochaux	Troyes
15:00 CET (UTC+1)	Tardieu 13', 68' (pen.); El Hajjam (yellow card) 36'; Chambost (yellow card) 90'	Report	Ambri (yellow card) 12'; Thioune (yellow card) 32'; Soumaré 60'; Lopy (yellow card) 67'	Stadium: Stade de l'Aube; Referee: Rémi Landry

23 January 2021 21	Pau	0–1	Troyes	Pau
19:00 CET (UTC+1)	Batisse (yellow card) 42'; Scaramozzino (yellow card) 79'	Report	Pintor (yellow card) 45+1'; Domingues 78'; Dembélé (yellow card) 90+3'	Stadium: Stade du Hameau; Referee: Nicolas Rainville

30 January 2021 22	Troyes	3–1	Auxerre	Troyes
15:00 CET (UTC+1)	Dingomé 28'; Raveloson 75'; Gallon (yellow card) 79'; Gory 90'; Salmier (yellow card) 90+2'	Report	Coeff (yellow card) 69'; Fortuné 79'	Stadium: Stade de l'Aube; Referee: Benoît Bastien

2 February 2021 23	Clermont	2–1	Troyes	Clermont-Ferrand
20:00 (CET) (UTC+1)	Zedadka 14', (yellow card) 60'; Bayo 29' (pen.); Ogier (yellow card) 31'; Magnin (yellow card) 90+1'	Report	Salmier (yellow card) 28', (goal) 71'; Giraudon (yellow card) 30'; Raveloson (yellow card) 31'; Kouamé (yellow card) 73'; Bozok (yellow card) 80'	Stadium: Stade Gabriel Montpied; Referee: Amaury Delerue

6 February 2021 24	Troyes	1–1	Toulouse	Troyes
15:00 CET (UTC+1)	Giraudon (yellow card) 29'; Salmier (yellow card) 36'; Dingomé 49'; El Hajjam (yellow card) 90+3'	Report	Adli 15'; Spierings (yellow card) 30'; Dejaegere (yellow card) 38'; Healey (yellow card) 70'	Stadium: Stade de l'Aube; Referee: Benoît Millot

13 February 2021 25	Troyes	2–1	Rodez	Troyes
19:00 CET (UTC+1)	Touzghar 2'; Pintor 46'; Dingomé (yellow card) 76'; Azamoum (yellow card) 80'; Giraudon (yellow card) 88'	Report	Célestine (yellow card) 29' (yellow-red card) 90+3'; Douline (yellow card) 58'; Boissier (yellow card) 62'; Dembélé 74'	Stadium: Stade de l'Aube; Referee: Mehdi Mokhtari

20 February 2021 26	Valenciennes	2–2	Troyes	Valenciennes
15:00 CET (UTC+1)	Guillaume 13'; Vandenabeele (yellow card) 45+3', (goal) 90+1'	Report	Mambo (yellow card) 17'; Mutombo (yellow card) 34'; Touzghar 64' (pen.); Chambost (yellow card) 68'; Gory 71'; Saint-Louis (yellow card) 83'	Stadium: Stade du Hainaut; Referee: Romain Lissorgue

27 February 2021 27	Troyes	1–0	Ajaccio	Troyes
15:00 CET (UTC+1)	Touzghar 90+3'	Report	Coutadeur (yellow card) 66'; Kalulu (yellow card) 90'	Stadium: Stade de l'Aube; Referee: Guillaume Paradis

2 March 2021 28	Chambly	0–3	Troyes	Chambly
20:00 CET (UTC+1)	Danger (red card) 38'; Derrien (yellow card) 47'	Report	El Hajjam (yellow card) 27'; Touzghar 40'; Raveloson (yellow card) 48'; Bozok 42' (pen.); Giraudon (yellow card) 76'; Domingues 87'	Stadium: Stade des Marais; Referee: Sylvain Palhies

13 March 2021 29	Troyes	1–5	Nancy	Troyes
20:00 CET (UTC+1)	Mutombo (yellow card) 13'; Salmier (yellow card) 19'; Touzghar (penalty missed) 23'; Giraudon (yellow card) 43'; Haag 61' (o.g.)	Report	Rocha Santos 15' (pen.), 20' (pen.); Scheidler (yellow card) 26', (goal) 46'; Triboulet 76'; Haag 86'	Stadium: Stade de l'Aube; Referee: Alexandre Perreau Niel

20 March 2021 30	Amiens SC	3–1	Troyes	Amiens
15:00 CET (UTC+1)	Wagué (yellow card) 24'; Lomotey 54'; Gomis 40'; Ciss (yellow card) 73'; Blin 78'	Report	Kouamé 15', (yellow card) 22'; Giraudon (red card) 45'; Bozok (yellow card) 82'; Tardieu (yellow card) 90+2'	Stadium: Stade de la Licorne; Referee: Benjamin Lepaysant

3 April 2021 31	Troyes	1–0	Guingamp	Troyes
20:00 CEST (UTC+1)	Dingomé 47'; Gory (yellow card) 55'	Report	Phiri (yellow card) 64'	Stadium: Stade de l'Aube; Referee: Olivier Thual

10 April 2021 32	Paris FC	1–1	Troyes	Paris
15:00 CEST (UTC+2)	López 3'; Name (red card) 38'	Report	Saint-Louis 36'; Tardieu (red card) 38'; Mutombo (yellow card) 43'	Stadium: Stade Sébastien Charléty; Referee: Bartolomeu Varela

17 April 2021 33	Troyes	1–0	Caen	Troyes
15:00 CEST (UTC+2)	Mutombo (yellow card) 24'; Dingomé 32'; Azamoum (yellow card) 69'	Report	Weber (yellow card) 33'	Stadium: Stade de l'Aube; Referee: Pierre Gaillouste

20 April 2021 34	Niort	0–3	Troyes	Niort
20:00 CET (UTC+1)	Vallier (yellow card) 9'; Kilama (yellow card) 47'; Jacob (yellow card) 81'; Mendes (yellow card) 84'	Report	Tardieu 10' (pen.), 78' (pen.); Suk 75'; Rui Pires (yellow card) 87'	Stadium: Stade René Gaillard; Referee: Alexandre Perreau Niel

24 April 2021 35	Troyes	3–1	Grenoble	Troyes
15:00 CEST (UTC+2)	Touzghar 10', 24'; Azamoum (yellow card) 22'; Giraudon (yellow card) 32'; Salmier (yellow card) 53'; Tardieu 72' (pen.), (yellow card) 88'	Report	Belmonte 7'; Anani (yellow card) 32'; Djitté (yellow card) 86'	Stadium: Stade de l'Aube; Referee: Romain Lissorgue

1 May 2021 36	Châteauroux	1–2	Troyes	Châteauroux
20:00 CET (UTC+1)	M'Boné 20', (yellow card) 53'; Mulumba (yellow card) 72' (yellow-red card) 83'; Grange (yellow card) 90+2'	Report	Tardieu 51' (pen.); Touzghar 71'	Stadium: Stade Gaston Petit; Referee: Mehdi Mokhtari

8 May 2021 37	Troyes	2–0	Dunkerque	Troyes
20:00 CEST (UTC+2)	Saint-Louis (yellow card) 24', (goal) 70'; Tardieu (penalty missed) 45'; Gory 59'; Suk (yellow card) 79'	Report	Diarra (yellow card) 90'	Stadium: Stade de l'Aube; Referee: Nicolas Rainville

15 May 2021 38	Le Havre	3–2	Troyes	Le Havre
20:00 CET (UTC+1)	Ba 25'; Thiaré 31' (pen.); Barker (yellow card) 45'; Alioui 69'	Report	Raveloson (yellow card) 31'; Touzghar 45+1' (pen.); Salmier (yellow card) 61', (goal) 89'	Stadium: Stade Océane; Referee: Romain Lissorgue

=== Coupe de France ===
19 January 2021 Eighth round	Auxerre	1–0	Troyes	Auxerre
21:00 CET (UTC+1)	Bellugou 58'	Report		Stadium: Stade de l'Abbé-Deschamps; Attendance: 0 Referee: Romain Delpech

== Statistics ==
=== Goalscorers ===
As of 15 May 2021

Rank	No.	Pos	Nat	Name	Ligue 2	Coupe de France	Total
1	7	FW	(Tunisia)	Yoann Touzghar	16	0	16
2	12	FW	(England)	Levi Lumeka	2	0	2
Totals					60	0	60
