= Dubroca =

Dubroca is a surname. Notable people with the surname include:

- Cyril Dubroca (born 1981), French footballer
- Daniel Dubroca (born 1954), French rugby union player and coach
