= Gauthier Gallon =

French footballer (born 1993)

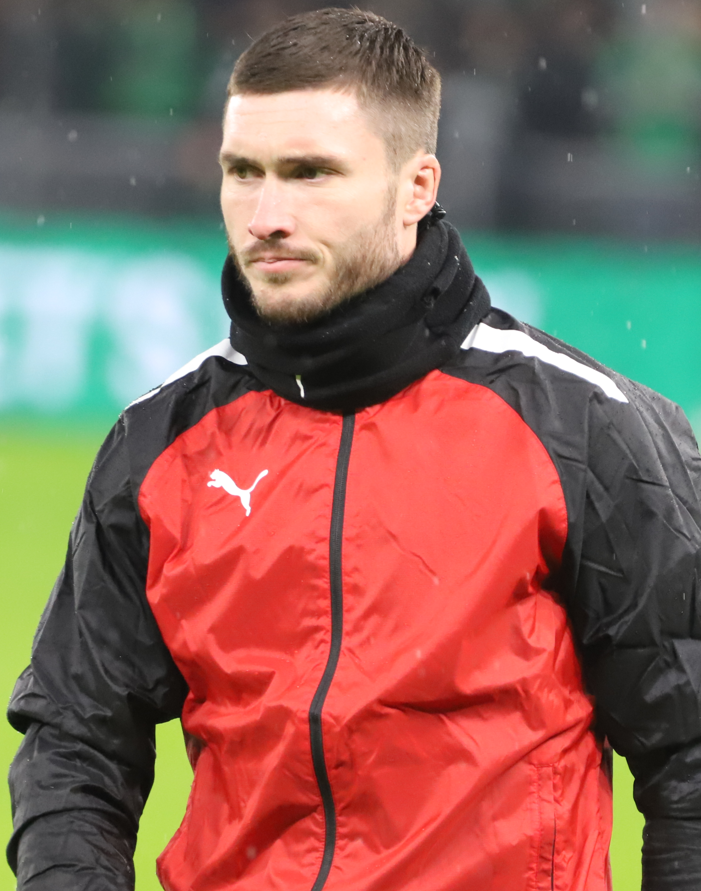
- Gallon with Rennes in 2025

Personal information
- Date of birth: 23 April 1993 (age 33)
- Place of birth: Nice, France
- Height: 1.86 m (6 ft 1 in)
- Position: Goalkeeper

Team information
- Current team: Le Havre
- Number: 93

Senior career*
Years	Team	Apps	(Gls)
2012–2017	Nîmes B	41	(0)
2014–2017	Nîmes	17	(0)
2017–2019	Orléans	66	(0)
2019–2023	Troyes	124	(0)
2023–2026	Rennes	1	(0)
2026	Dender EH	13	(0)
2026–	Le Havre	5	(0)
- * Club domestic league appearances and goals as of 18 October 2026

Gauthier Gallon (born 23 April 1993) is a French professional footballer who plays as a goalkeeper for Ligue 1 club Le Havre.

== Club career ==
On 13 January 2026, Gallon signed for Dender EH in Belgium.

On 26 August 2026, Gallon returned to France and signed a one-year deal with Le Havre.

== Career statistics ==
As of match played 18 October 2026

Appearances and goals by club, season and competition
Club	Season	League			National cup		League cup		Europe		Other		Total	
Club	Season	Division	Apps	Goals	Apps	Goals	Apps	Goals	Apps	Goals	Apps	Goals	Apps	Goals
Nîmes B	2012–13	CFA 2	4	0	—		—		—		—		4	0
Nîmes B	2013–14	CFA 2	20	0	—		—		—		—		20	0
Nîmes B	2014–15	CFA 2	11	0	—		—		—		—		11	0
Nîmes B	2015–16	CFA 2	3	0	—		—		—		—		3	0
Nîmes B	2016–17	CFA 2	3	0	—		—		—		—		3	0
Nîmes B	Total		41	0	—		—		—		—		41	0
Nîmes	2011–12	CFA	0	0	—		—		—		—		0	0
Nîmes	2013–14	Ligue 2	0	0	0	0	0	0	—		—		0	0
Nîmes	2014–15	Ligue 2	0	0	3	0	0	0	—		—		3	0
Nîmes	2015–16	Ligue 2	3	0	2	0	1	0	—		—		6	0
Nîmes	2016–17	Ligue 2	14	0	0	0	1	0	—		—		15	0
Nîmes	Total		17	0	5	0	2	0	—		—		24	0
Orléans	2017–18	Ligue 2	29	0	0	0	0	0	—		—		29	0
Orléans	2018–19	Ligue 2	37	0	0	0	0	0	—		—		37	0
Orléans	Total		66	0	0	0	0	0	—		—		66	0
Troyes	2019–20	Ligue 2	28	0	0	0	0	0	—		—		28	0
Troyes	2020–21	Ligue 2	35	0	0	0	—		—		—		35	0
Troyes	2021–22	Ligue 1	31	0	0	0	—		—		—		31	0
Troyes	2022–23	Ligue 1	30	0	0	0	—		—		—		30	0
Troyes	Total		124	0	0	0	0	0	—		—		124	0
Rennes	2023–24	Ligue 1	0	0	4	0	—		1	0	—		5	0
Rennes	2024–25	Ligue 1	1	0	1	0	—		—		—		2	0
Rennes	Total		1	0	5	0	—		1	0	—		7	0
Dender EH	2025–26	Belgian Pro League	13	0	1	0	—		—		2 (Note: Appearances in relegation play-offs)	0	16	0
Le Havre	2026–27	Ligue 1	5	0	0	0	—		—		—		5	0
Career total			267	0	11	0	2	0	1	0	2	0	283	0
