= Rominigue Kouamé =

Malian footballer (born 1996)

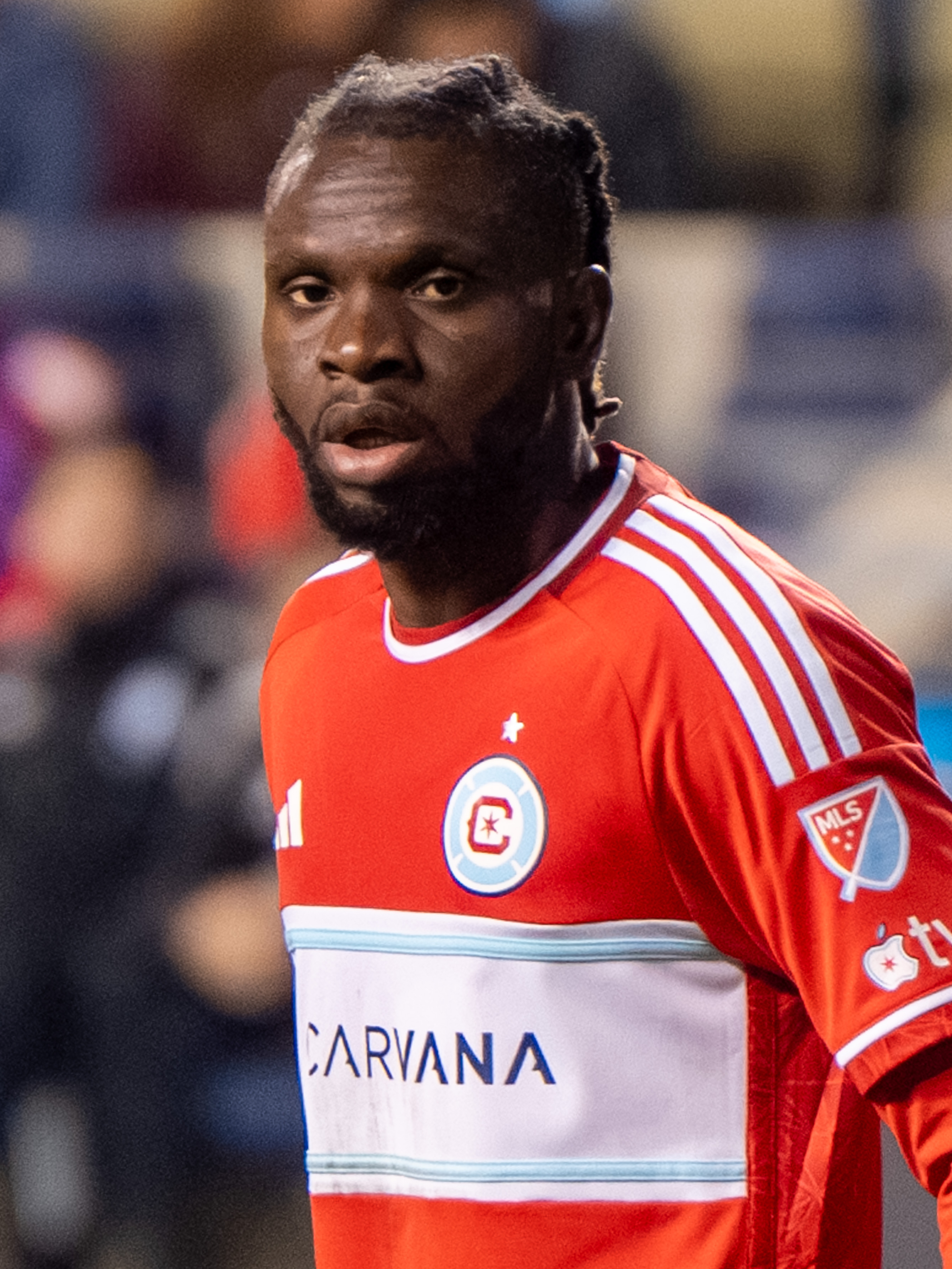
- Kouamé with the Chicago Fire in 2025

Personal information
- Full name: Rominigue Kouamé N'Guessan
- Date of birth: 17 December 1996 (age 29)
- Place of birth: Lopou, Ivory Coast
- Height: 1.77 m (5 ft 10 in)
- Position: Midfielder

Team information
- Current team: Clermont
- Number: 26

Youth career
- 2008-2014: Académie JMG
- 2014-2016: AS Real Bamako
- 2016–2017: Lille

Senior career*
Years	Team	Apps	(Gls)
2016–2021	Lille II	31	(0)
2017–2021	Lille	6	(0)
2018–2019	→ Paris FC (loan)	26	(0)
2019–2020	→ Cercle Brugge (loan)	13	(0)
2020–2021	→ Troyes (loan)	39	(2)
2021–2023	Troyes	70	(2)
2023–2026	Cádiz	37	(0)
2025	→ Chicago Fire (loan)	21	(3)
2026–	Clermont	1	(0)

International career^{‡}
2016–	Mali	7	(0)
- * Club domestic league appearances and goals as of 4 September 2026 ‡ National team caps and goals as of 20:29, 2 August 2020 (UTC)

Rominigue Kouamé N'Guessan (born 17 December 1996) is a professional footballer who plays as midfielder for Ligue 2 club Clermont. Born in Ivory Coast, he represents Mali at international level.

== Club career ==
=== Lille ===
Kouamé developed his football skills at the JMG Academy in Mali and AS Real Bamako before joining Lille in France in 2016. After gaining experience with the reserve team, he broke into the first team during the 2017–18 season, making six appearances in Ligue 1.

During the 2018–19 season, he was loaned to Paris FC, making 26 appearances in Ligue 2. In the first half of the 2019–20 season, he was loaned to Cercle Brugge in Belgium, where he made 13 appearances in the Belgian Pro League. In January 2020, he joined Ligue 2 side Troyes on loan, making seven league appearances during the remainder of the season.

Kouamé remained on loan at Troyes for the 2020–21 season, making 32 appearances and scoring two goals in Ligue 2. Troyes won the Ligue 2 title that season, securing promotion to Ligue 1. In June 2021, Lille confirmed Kouamé's permanent transfer to Troyes after the conditions for the transfer following the club's promotion were met.

=== Troyes ===
Kouamé played as a midfielder for Troyes, making 34 appearances and scoring one goal in Ligue 1 during the 2021–22 season. In the 2022–23 season, he made 32 Ligue 1 appearances and scored one goal. At the beginning of the 2023–24 season, he made four appearances in Ligue 2 before moving to Spain.

In September 2023, Troyes announced that Kouamé had made a total of 109 appearances for the club, scoring five goals and providing seven assists.

=== Cádiz ===
In September 2023, Kouamé joined Cádiz in Spain on a permanent transfer from Troyes. He made 16 appearances in La Liga during the 2023–24 season. Cádiz were relegated to the Segunda División at the end of the season, and Kouamé made 13 appearances in Spain's second tier during the 2024–25 season.

==== Loan to Chicago Fire ====
On 24 January 2025, Kouamé joined Chicago Fire of Major League Soccer (MLS) on loan for the 2025 season. The agreement included an option to make the transfer permanent. At the end of the season, Chicago Fire did not exercise the purchase option, and the loan deal expired at the end of 2025.

=== Clermont ===
On 1 September 2026, Kouamé joined Clermont in France after terminating his contract with Cádiz, signing a deal until June 2027.

== International career ==
Although Kouamé was born in Lopou, Ivory Coast, he also holds Malian nationality and chose to represent the Mali national team. He joined the JMG Academy in Bamako, Mali, at the age of 12, spending his formative years there before developing as a footballer in Mali.

In 2016, he participated in the 2016 African Nations Championship, held in Rwanda. Kouamé made six appearances in the tournament, helping Mali reach the final. Mali defeated the Tunisia 2–1 in the quarter-finals to advance to the semi-finals, where they beat the Ivory Coast 1–0. However, they lost 3–0 to the DR Congo in the final, finishing as runners-up.

On 1 September 2017, Kouamé featured in a 2018 FIFA World Cup qualifying match against the Morocco. Mali lost the away match 6–0 and drew 0–0 against Morocco in the return fixture four days later. Mali failed to qualify for the 2018 FIFA World Cup.

Kouamé was also included in Mali's final squad for the 2021 Africa Cup of Nations, held in Cameroon in 2022. Mali recorded two wins and one draw against the Tunisia, the Gambia, and the Mauritania in the group stage, finishing first in their group to advance to the round of 16. However, they were eliminated by the Equatorial Guinea after a 0–0 draw and a 5–6 defeat in the penalty shoot-out. Although Kouamé was included in the final squad, he did not make an appearance in the tournament.

== Career statistics ==
=== Club ===
As of 29 March 2024

Appearances and goals by club, season and competition
Club	Season	League			National cup		League cup		Europe		Other		Total	
Club	Season	Division	Apps	Goals	Apps	Goals	Apps	Goals	Apps	Goals	Apps	Goals	Apps	Goals
Lille	2017–18	Ligue 1	6	0	0	0	0	0	—		—		6	0
Paris FC (loan)	2018–19	Ligue 2	25	0	0	0	1	0	—		1	0	27	0
Cercle Brugge (loan)	2019–20	Belgian Pro League	13	0	1	0	—		—		—		14	0
Troyes (loan)	2019–20	Ligue 2	7	0	—		—		—		—		7	0
Troyes (loan)	2020–21	Ligue 2	32	2	0	0	—		—		—		32	2
Troyes	2021–22	Ligue 1	34	1	0	0	—		—		—		34	1
Troyes	2022–23	Ligue 1	32	1	0	0	—		—		—		32	1
Troyes	2023–24	Ligue 2	4	1	—		—		—		—		34	1
Troyes	Total		109	5	0	0	—		—		—		109	5
Cádiz	2023–24	La Liga	16	0	1	0	—		—		—		17	0
Career total			169	5	2	0	1	0	0	0	1	0	173	5
