= Cyril Dubroca =

French footballer (born 1981)

Personal information
- Date of birth: February 8, 1981 (age 45)
- Place of birth: Mont-de-Marsan, France
- Height: 1.70 m (5 ft 7 in)
- Position: Defender

Team information
- Current team: Genêts Anglet

Senior career*
Years	Team	Apps	(Gls)
2000–2003	Toulouse (B team)		
2000–2002	Toulouse	13	(0)
2003–2005	Trélissac		
2005–	Genêts Anglet		
- * Club domestic league appearances and goals as of 17:58, 25 November 2009 (UTC)

Cyril Dubroca (born February 8, 1981, in Mont-de-Marsan) is a French professional football player who played in Ligue 1 for Toulouse.
