= Yoann Salmier =

Footballer (born 1992)

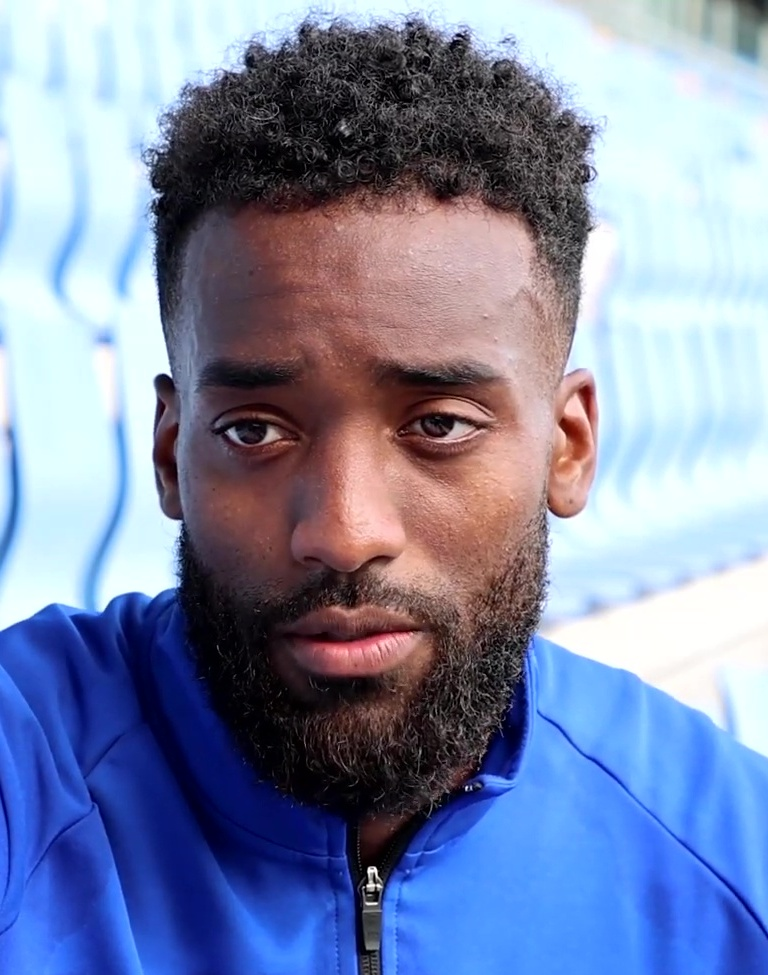
- Salmier in 2021

Personal information
- Date of birth: 21 November 1992 (age 33)
- Place of birth: Villiers-le-Bel, France
- Height: 1.88 m (6 ft 2 in)
- Position: Centre-back

Team information
- Current team: Clermont
- Number: 21

Senior career*
Years	Team	Apps	(Gls)
2014–2019	Strasbourg B	6	(3)
2014–2019	Strasbourg	67	(1)
2018–2019	→ Troyes (loan)	34	(0)
2019–2023	Troyes	125	(4)
2023–2025	Le Havre	33	(1)
2025–	Clermont	51	(2)

International career^{‡}
2016–	French Guiana	4	(0)
- * Club domestic league appearances and goals as of 18 September 2026 ‡ National team caps and goals as of 30 September 2026

Yoann Salmier (born 21 November 1992) is a professional footballer who plays as a centre-back for Ligue 2 club Clermont. Born in metropolitan France, he represents French Guiana at international level.

== Club career ==
After having spent the 2018–19 season at Troyes on loan from Strasbourg, Troyes signed him permanently on a three-year deal in June 2019.

On 3 February 2025, Salmier joined Clermont in Ligue 2 on a one-and-a-half-year contract.

== International career ==
Salmier made his debut for the French Guiana national team in a 2–1 2017 Caribbean Cup qualification loss to the Dominican Republic on 7 June 2016.

== Career statistics ==
As of match played 18 September 2026

Appearances and goals by club, season and competition
Club	Season	League			Cup		League Cup		Other		Total	
Club	Season	Division	Apps	Goals	Apps	Goals	Apps	Goals	Apps	Goals	Apps	Goals
Strasbourg	2014–15	CFA	20	1	2	0	—		—		22	1
Strasbourg	2015–16	CFA	11	0	0	0	—		—		11	0
Strasbourg	2016–17	Ligue 2	22	0	3	0	2	0	—		27	0
Strasbourg	2017–18	Ligue 1	14	0	3	0	2	0	—		19	0
Strasbourg	Total		67	1	8	0	4	0	—		79	1
Strasbourg II	2015–16	National 3	3	2	—		—		—		3	2
Strasbourg II	2017–18	National 3	3	1	—		—		—		3	1
Strasbourg II	Total		6	3	—		—		—		6	3
Troyes (loan)	2018–19	Ligue 2	34	0	2	0	2	0	—		38	0
Troyes	2019–20	Ligue 2	27	1	1	0	1	0	—		29	1
Troyes	2020–21	Ligue 2	35	2	0	0	—		—		35	2
Troyes	2021–22	Ligue 1	31	0	0	0	—		—		31	0
Troyes	2022–23	Ligue 1	32	1	0	0	—		—		32	1
Troyes	Total		159	4	3	0	3	0	—		165	4
Le Havre	2023–24	Ligue 1	20	1	1	0	—		—		21	1
Le Havre	2024–25	Ligue 1	13	0	0	0	—		—		13	0
Le Havre	Total		33	1	1	0	—		—		34	1
Clermont	2024–25	Ligue 2	13	1	0	0	—		2	0	15	1
Clermont	2025–26	Ligue 2	31	1	—		—		—		31	1
Clermont	2026–27	Ligue 2	7	0	—		—		—		7	0
Clermont	Total		51	2	0	0	—		2	0	53	2
Career total			316	11	12	0	7	0	0	0	337	11
