= Ryan Bouallak =

French footballer (born 1999)

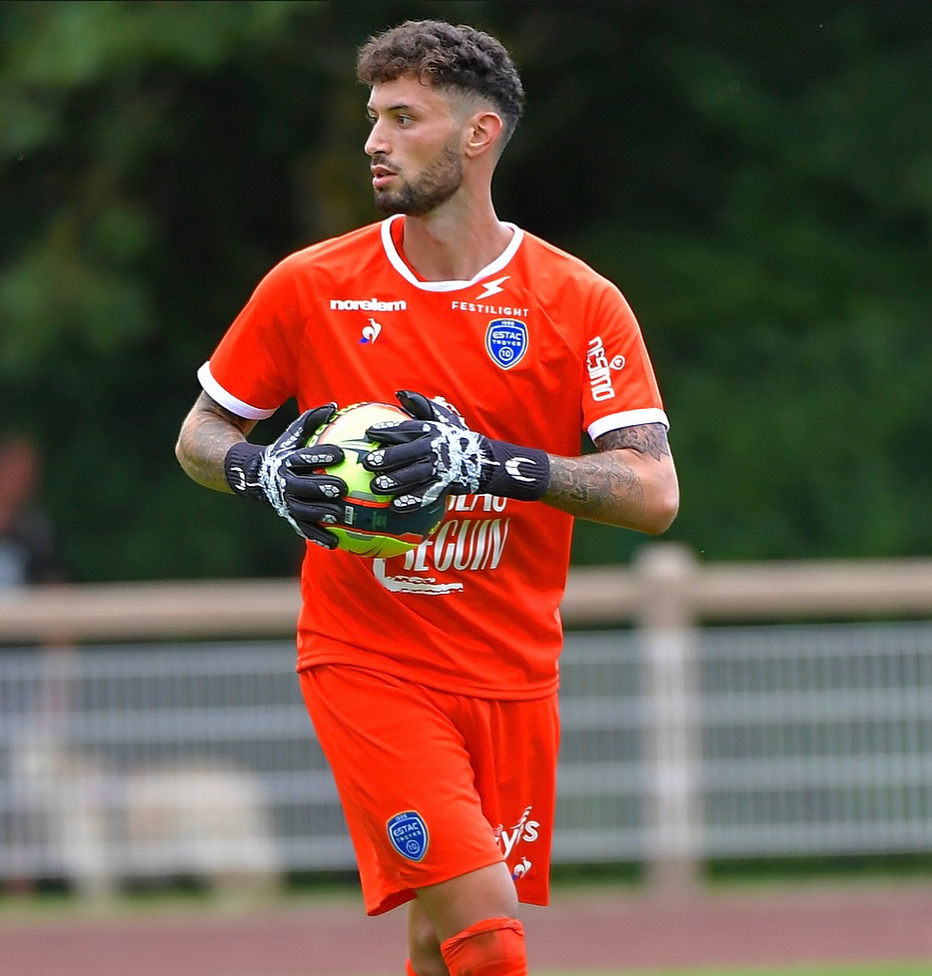
- Bouallak with Troyes in 2021

Personal information
- Date of birth: 19 August 1999 (age 27)
- Place of birth: Montreuil, France
- Height: 1.90 m (6 ft 3 in)
- Position: Goalkeeper

Team information
- Current team: Saint-Ouen-L'Aumône

Youth career
- 2005–2011: Olympique Noisy-le-Sec
- 2011–2013: JA Drancy
- 2013–2018: Saint-Étienne

Senior career*
Years	Team	Apps	(Gls)
2016–2018	Saint-Étienne B	1	(0)
2018–2019	Reims B	15	(0)
2019–2022	Troyes B	29	(0)
2021–2022	Troyes	1	(0)
2024	Stade Pontivy	9	(0)
2024–2025	Genêts Anglet	1	(0)
2025–	Saint-Ouen-L'Aumône	6	(0)
- * Club domestic league appearances and goals as of 13 December 2025

Ryan Bouallak (born 19 August 1999) is a French footballer who plays as a goalkeeper for Championnat National 3 club AS Saint-Ouen-L'Aumône.

== Club career ==
Bouallek started his youth career with Olympique Noisy-le-Sec before moving to JA Drancy and Saint-Étienne. In September 2016, he played a match for Saint-Étienne's reserve side in the French fifth division. He joined Reims in January 2018.

Bouallak moved to Troyes in July 2019, where he signed a three-year contract. He made his professional debut for the club on 15 May 2021 in a 2–3 league defeat against Le Havre. He started the match on bench and came on as an 80th-minute substitute for Sébastien Renot.

On 31 January 2024, Bouallak joined Stade Pontivy. In July 2024, he moved to Genêts Anglet.

== International career ==
Bouallak have received call-up to France national under-18 team in the past, but didn't play any game. He is also eligible to play for Algeria.

== Career statistics ==
=== Club ===
As of 15 May 2021

Appearances and goals by club, season and competition
Club	Season	League			Cup		Continental		Total	
Club	Season	Division	Apps	Goals	Apps	Goals	Apps	Goals	Apps	Goals
Saint-Étienne B	2016–17	Championnat National 3	1	0	—		—		1	0
Saint-Étienne B	2017–18	Championnat National 3	0	0	—		—		0	0
Saint-Étienne B	Total		1	0	0	0	0	0	1	0
Reims B	2017–18	Championnat National 2	1	0	—		—		1	0
Reims B	2018–19	Championnat National 2	14	0	—		—		14	0
Reims B	Total		15	0	0	0	0	0	15	0
Troyes B	2019–20	Championnat National 3	13	0	—		—		13	0
Troyes B	2020–21	Championnat National 3	5	0	—		—		5	0
Troyes B	Total		18	0	0	0	0	0	18	0
Troyes	2020–21	Ligue 2	1	0	0	0	—		1	0
Career total			35	0	0	0	0	0	35	0

== Honours ==
Troyes

- Ligue 2: 2020–21
