= Brandon Domingues =

French footballer (born 2000)

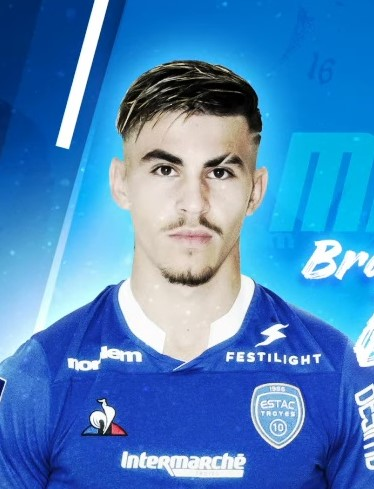
- Domingues in 2021

Personal information
- Full name: Brandon José Dominguès
- Date of birth: 6 June 2000 (age 26)
- Place of birth: Grenoble, France
- Height: 1.72 m (5 ft 8 in)
- Position: Attacking midfielder

Team information
- Current team: Oviedo

Youth career
- 2006–2016: Grenoble
- 2016–2017: Troyes

Senior career*
Years	Team	Apps	(Gls)
2017–2022	Troyes B	51	(17)
2020–2022	Troyes	29	(4)
2022–2023	Honvéd	19	(4)
2023–2025	Debrecen	57	(18)
2025–	Oviedo	0	(0)
2026	→ Górnik Zabrze (loan)	5	(0)
- * Club domestic league appearances and goals as of 14:45, 29 April 2026 (UTC)

Brandon José Dominguès (born 6 June 2000) is a French professional footballer who plays for Segunda División club Real Oviedo. Mainly an attacking midfielder, he can also play as a winger.

== Career ==
=== Troyes ===
On 25 June 2020, Domingues signed his first professional contract with Troyes. He made his professional debut with the club in a 2–1 Ligue 2 loss to Auxerre on 21 September 2020.

On 30 August 2022, Domingues's contract with Troyes was terminated by mutual consent.

=== Budapest Honvéd ===
Domingues joined Nemzeti Bajnokság I club Budapest Honvéd on 1 September 2022, signing a two-year contract with the Hungarian side. He made his debut for the club on 10 September, replacing Dominik Kocsis in the 69th minute of a 0–0 home draw against Kecskemét in the league. In the following league game, on 1 October, Domingues scored his first goal for Honvéd after coming on at half-time in a 4–3 loss to Debrecen. He scored his first brace for the club on 11 February 2023 in the return game against Kecskemét, saving a point for Honvéd in a 2–2 away draw at Széktói Stadion.

=== Debrecen ===
On 11 July 2023, Domingues moved to Debreceni VSC also in the Hungarian top tier.

=== Oviedo ===
On 24 June 2025, Domingues joined La Liga side Real Oviedo on a three-year contract. On 30 December 2025, after just one cup match, he was loaned to Polish club Górnik Zabrze until June 2026. On 28 April 2026, he was recalled by Oviedo after suffering a season-ending knee injury; during his stint in Poland, Domingues made six appearances for Górnik in all competitions.

== Personal life ==
Born in France, Domingues is of Portuguese descent and holds dual French-Portuguese citizenship.

== Career statistics ==
As of match played 22 March 2026

Appearances and goals by club, season and competition
Club	Season	League			National cup (Note: Includes Coupe de France, Magyar Kupa, Copa del Rey, Polish Cup)		Europe		Total	
Club	Season	Division	Apps	Goals	Apps	Goals	Apps	Goals	Apps	Goals
Troyes	2020–21	Ligue 2	18	3	1	0	—		19	3
Troyes	2021–22	Ligue 1	11	1	1	1	—		12	2
Troyes	Total		29	4	2	1	—		31	5
Honvéd	2022–23	Nemzeti Bajnokság I	19	4	1	0	—		20	4
Debrecen	2023–24	Nemzeti Bajnokság I	26	6	2	1	4 (Note: Appearances in UEFA Conference League)	0	32	7
Debrecen	2024–25	Nemzeti Bajnokság I	31	12	1	0	—		32	12
Debrecen	Total		57	18	3	1	4	0	64	19
Real Oviedo	2025–26	La Liga	0	0	1	0	—		1	0
Górnik Zabrze (loan)	2025–26	Ekstraklasa	5	0	1	0	—		6	0
Career total			110	26	8	2	4	0	122	28
