= Jimmy Giraudon =

French footballer (born 1992)

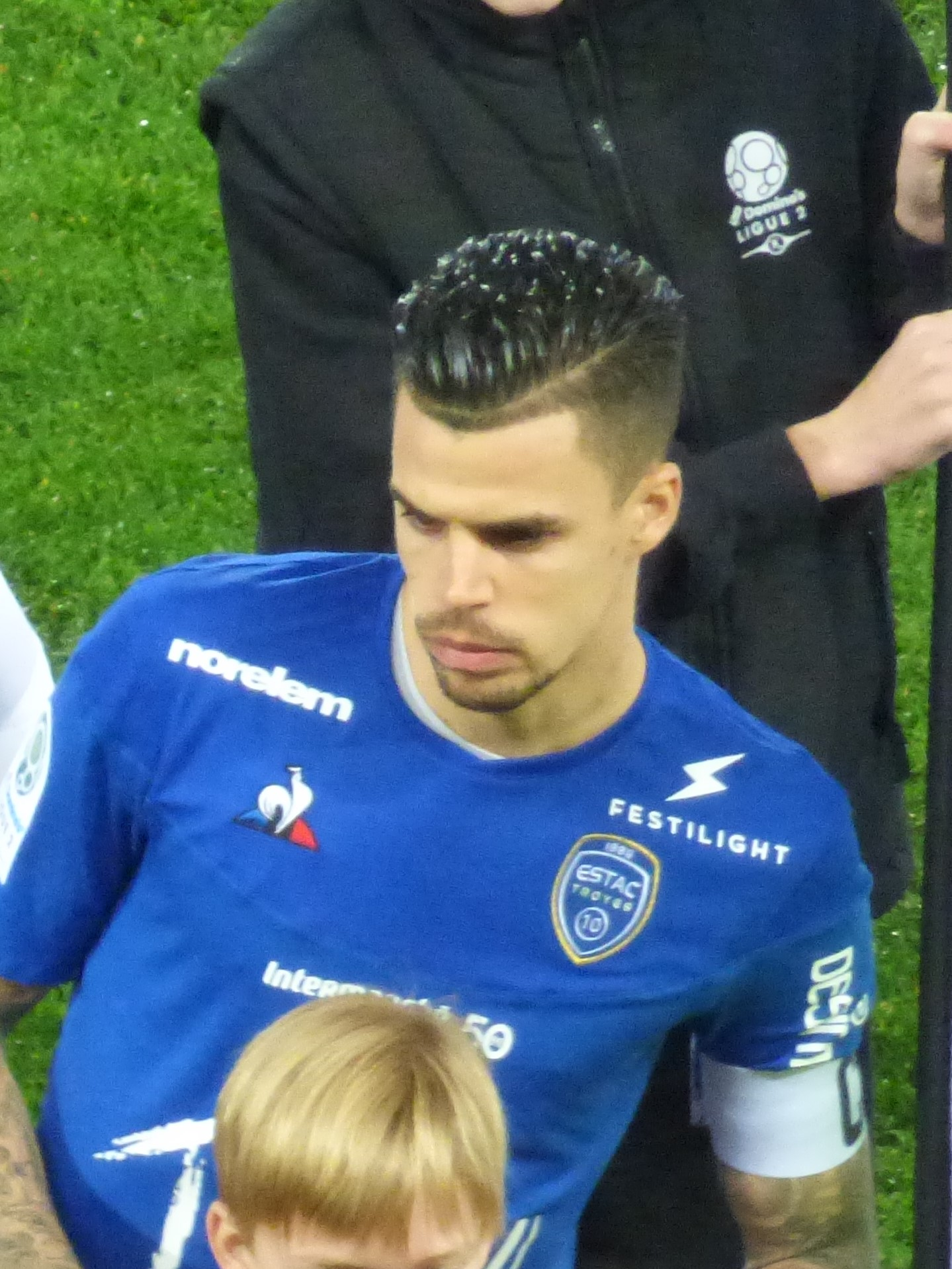
- Giraudon playing for Troyes in 2020

Personal information
- Date of birth: 16 January 1992 (age 34)
- Place of birth: La Rochelle, France
- Height: 1.84 m (6 ft 0 in)
- Position: Defender

Senior career*
Years	Team	Apps	(Gls)
2010–2012	Chamois Niortais	21	(0)
2012–2016	Grenoble	101	(1)
2016–2022	Troyes	173	(2)
2022	→ Leganés (loan)	5	(0)
2017	Troyes B	2	(0)
2022–2023	Saint-Étienne	16	(0)
2024–2026	Orléans	50	(1)
- * Club domestic league appearances and goals as of 23 June 2026

Jimmy Giraudon (born 16 January 1992) is a French professional footballer who plays as a defender.

== Career ==
In summer 2016, Giraudon joined Troyes on a two-year deal. On 31 January 2022, he moved abroad after agreeing to a loan deal with Segunda División side Leganés for the remainder of the season.

On 24 June 2022, Giraudon signed for Ligue 2 side Saint-Étienne on a two-year contract, and chose the number 5 jersey at the club. He left the club on 1 July 2023 after his contract was terminated by mutual consent.

== Career statistics ==
As of 1 July 2023

Appearances and goals by club, season and competition
Club	Season	League			National cup		League cup		Total		Total	
Club	Season	Division	Apps	Goals	Apps	Goals	Apps	Goals	Apps	Goals	Apps	Goals
Chamois Niortais	2010–11	National	4	0	0	0	—		—		4	0
Chamois Niortais	2011–12	National	17	0	5	0	—		—		22	0
Chamois Niortais	Total		21	0	5	0	—		—		26	0
Grenoble	2012–13	CFA	24	0	0	0	—		—		24	0
Grenoble	2013–14	CFA	22	1	5	0	—		—		27	1
Grenoble	2014–15	CFA	25	0	7	0	—		—		32	0
Grenoble	2015–16	CFA	30	0	4	1	—		—		34	1
Grenoble	Total		101	1	16	1	—		—		117	2
Troyes	2016–17	Ligue 2	34	2	2	0	1	0	2 (Note: Appearances in the Ligue 1 relegation/promotion play-offs)	0	39	2
Troyes	2017–18	Ligue 1	25	0	2	0	1	0	—		28	0
Troyes	2018–19	Ligue 2	36	0	2	0	2	0	—		40	0
Troyes	2019–20	Ligue 2	26	0	0	0	1	0	—		27	0
Troyes	2020–21	Ligue 2	33	0	0	0	—		—		33	0
Troyes	2021–22	Ligue 1	19	0	0	0	—		—		19	0
Troyes	Total		173	2	6	0	5	0	2	0	186	2
Troyes B	2016–17	CFA 2	1	0	—		—		—		1	0
Troyes B	2017–18	National 3	1	0	—		—		—		1	0
Troyes B	Total		2	0	—		—		—		2	0
Leganés (loan)	2021–22	Segunda División	5	0	0	0	—		—		5	0
Saint-Étienne	2022–23	Ligue 2	16	0	1	0	—		—		17	0
Career total			318	3	28	1	5	0	2	0	353	4

== Honours ==
Troyes

- Ligue 2: 2020–21
