= Les Genêts d'Anglet =

French football club

Genêts Anglet
- Full name: Les Genêts d'Anglet Football
- Nickname: Les Genêts (The Brooms)
- Founded: 1910; 116 years ago
- Ground: Stade Saint-Jean
- Chairman: Frédéric Teiletche
- Manager: Henri Olazcuaga
- League: Championnat National 2
- 2025–26: National 3 Group A, 6th of 16
- Website: https://www.genets-anglet.fr
Home colours	Away colours

Les Genêts d'Anglet Football is a French football team founded in 1910. It is based in Anglet, Pyrénées-Atlantiques, France and plays in the Championnat National 2. They play at the Stade Choisy in Anglet.

== Current squad ==
As of 26 December 2024.

Note: Flags indicate national team as defined under FIFA eligibility rules; some limited exceptions apply. Players may hold more than one non-FIFA nationality.

No.	Pos.	Nation	Player
1	GK	FRA	Ryan Bouallak
2	DF	FRA	Kamil Ouraghi
3	MF	FRA	Arnaud Haure
4	DF	FRA	Damien Guével
5	DF	FRA	Sullivan Bouchité
6	MF	FRA	Vincent Mendiburu
7	FW	CHA	Samuel Betina
8	MF	USA	Richard Ruiz
9	FW	FRA	Arnaud Rollin
10	MF	FRA	Thibault Lapeyre
11	MF	FRA	Alexandre Zahi
14	DF	FRA	Dorian Chailleux
15	DF	FRA	Florian Becaas
16	GK	FRA	Eneko Feltrin
17	MF	FRA	Lilian Laplace-Palette

No.	Pos.	Nation	Player
18	MF	FRA	Quentin Ranquine
19	DF	FRA	Yanis Leriche
20	FW	FRA	William Nguea Mandengue
21	FW	FRA	Xan Daguerre
22	DF	FRA	Elhadji Sanha
23	FW	FRA	Marius Ros
25	MF	FRA	Lucas Laplace Palette
27	MF	FRA	Tim Rey
29	MF	FRA	Romain Thomas
30	GK	FRA	Valentin Da Ros
33	MF	FRA	Mathis Lapeyre
34	FW	FRA	Anthony Coloneaux
35	MF	FRA	Enzo Daguerre
40	GK	FRA	Lucas Giffard
