= Oualid El Hajjam =

Moroccan footballer (born 1991)

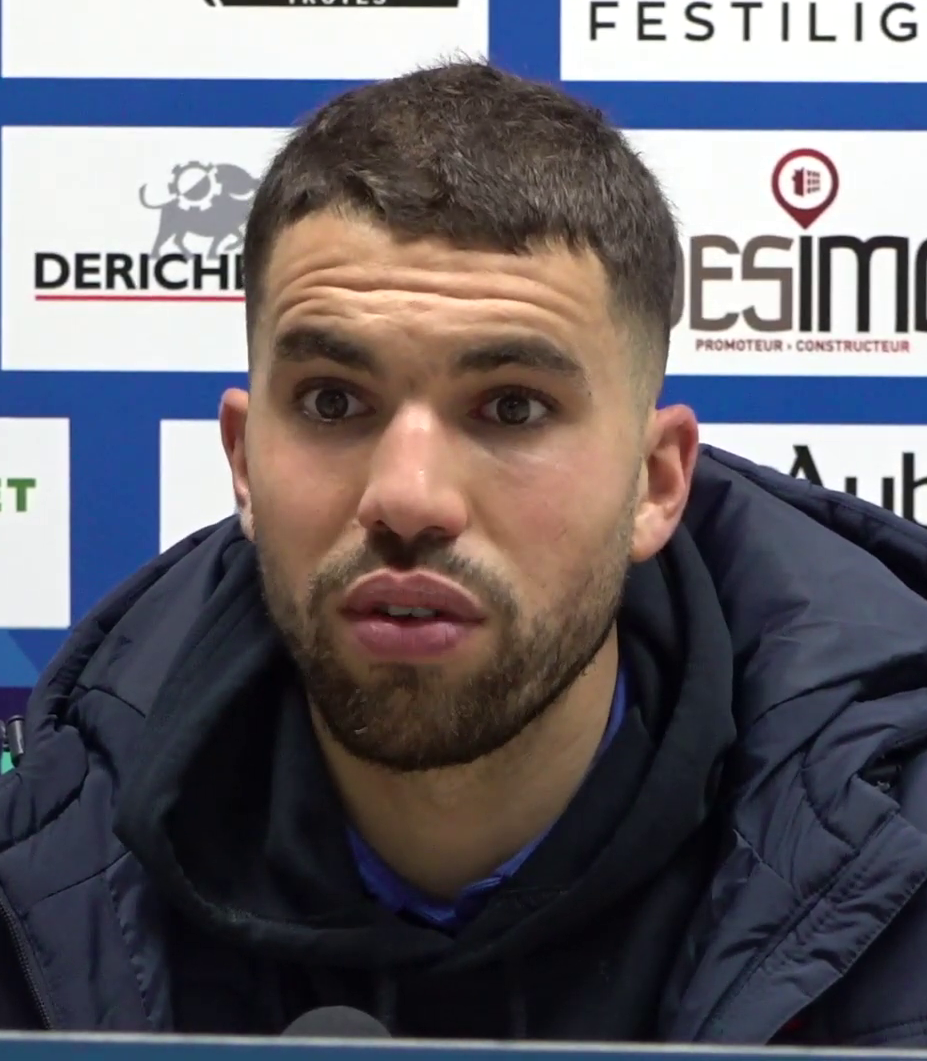
- El Hajjam in 2020

Personal information
- Date of birth: 19 February 1991 (age 35)
- Place of birth: Châteauroux, France
- Height: 1.80 m (5 ft 11 in)
- Position: Defender

Team information
- Current team: Bordeaux
- Number: 21

Senior career*
Years	Team	Apps	(Gls)
2008–2011	Le Mans	0	(0)
2011–2019	Amiens	123	(3)
2019–2022	Troyes	69	(2)
2022–2025	Le Havre	49	(1)
2025–	Bordeaux	6	(0)

International career^{‡}
2018–	Morocco	3	(0)
- * Club domestic league appearances and goals as of 4 December 2025 ‡ National team caps and goals as of 21 April 2024

Oualid El Hajjam (Arabic: وليد الحجام; born 19 February 1991) is a professional footballer who plays as a defender for Régional 1 club Bordeaux. Born in France, he represents Morocco at international level.

== Club career ==
On 15 July 2022, El Hajjam signed a two-year contract with Le Havre.

== International career ==
El Hajjam made his senior debut for the Morocco national football team in a 2–0 friendly win over Uzbekistan on 27 March 2018.

== Career statistics ==
As of 29 August 2021

Appearances and goals by club, season and competition
Club	Season	League			Coupe de France		Coupe de la Ligue		Total	
Club	Season	Division	Apps	Goals	Apps	Goals	Apps	Goals	Apps	Goals
Le Mans B	2008–09	CFA Group C	10	1	–		–		10	1
Le Mans B	2009–10	CFA Group C	10	0	–		–		10	0
Le Mans B	2010–11	CFA Group D	16	0	–		–		16	0
Le Mans B	Total		36	1	0	0	0	0	36	1
Amiens	2011–12	Ligue 2	0	0	0	0	0	0	0	0
Amiens	2012–13	National	7	0	0	0	–		7	0
Amiens	2013–14	National	20	0	0	0	1	0	21	0
Amiens	2014–15	National	13	1	1	0	–		14	1
Amiens	2015–16	National	18	0	0	0	–		18	0
Amiens	2016–17	Ligue 2	28	1	0	0	0	0	28	1
Amiens	2017–18	Ligue 1	26	1	1	0	2	0	27	1
Amiens	2018–19	Ligue 1	11	0	2	0	2	0	15	0
Amiens	Total		123	3	4	0	5	0	132	3
Troyes	2019–20	Ligue 2	22	1	1	0	0	0	23	1
Troyes	2020–21	Ligue 2	28	0	0	0	–		28	0
Troyes	2020–21	Ligue 1	4	1	0	0	–		4	1
Troyes	Total		54	2	1	0	0	0	55	2
Career total			213	6	5	0	5	0	223	6
