= Lenny Pintor =

French association football player (born 2000)

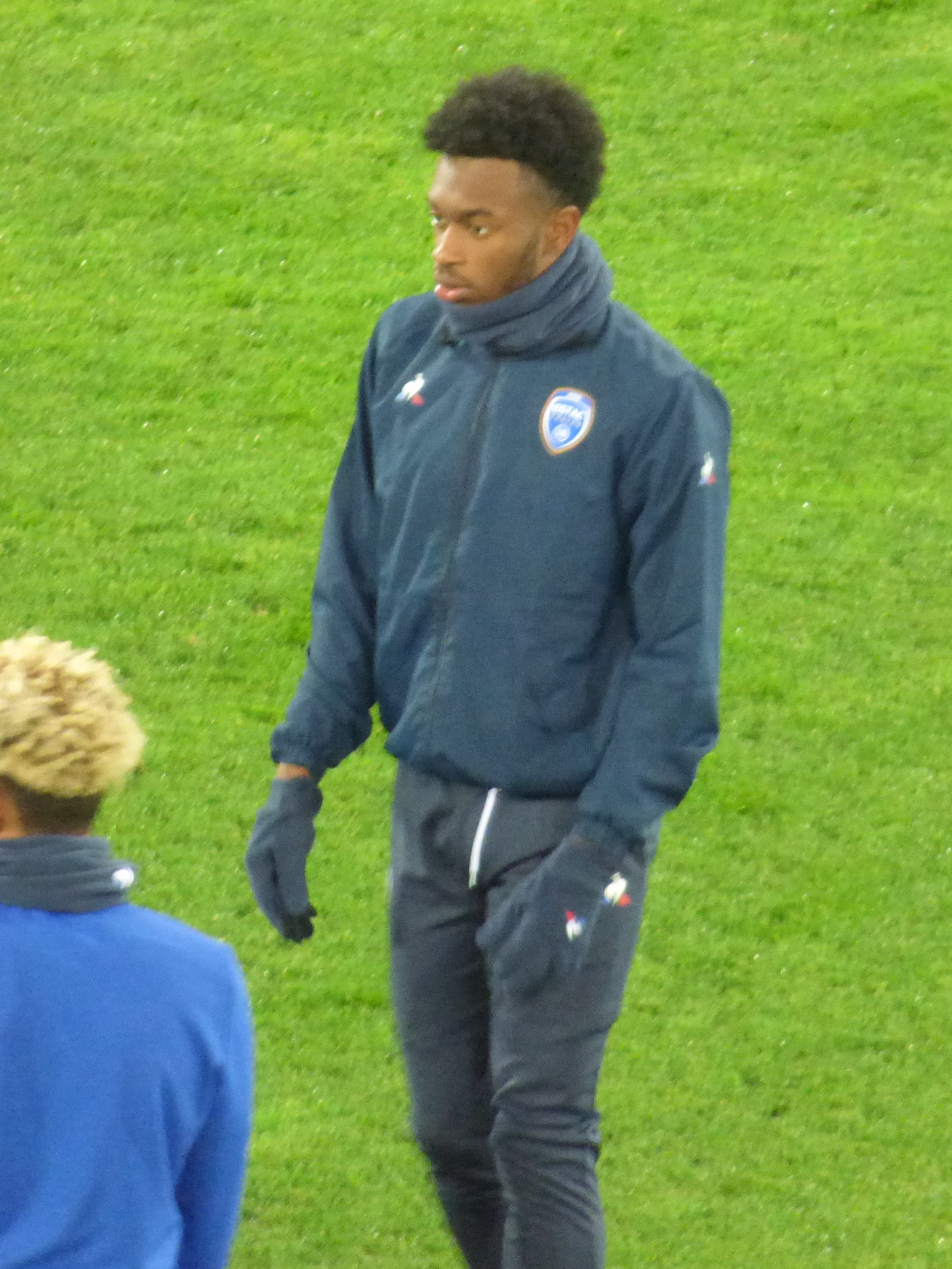
- Pintor with Troyes in 2020

Personal information
- Full name: Lenny Jean-Pierre Pintor
- Date of birth: 5 August 2000 (age 26)
- Place of birth: Paris, France
- Height: 1.79 m (5 ft 10 in)
- Position: Winger

Team information
- Current team: Eyüpspor
- Number: 11

Youth career
- 2007–2013: Saint Brice FC
- 2013–2015: Sarcelles AAS
- 2015–2017: Bastia

Senior career*
Years	Team	Apps	(Gls)
2017	Bastia B	1	(0)
2017–2018	Brest B	9	(5)
2017–2018	Brest	6	(0)
2018-2022	Lyon	1	(0)
2018–2022	Lyon B	16	(4)
2019–2020	→ Troyes (loan)	19	(4)
2020	→ Troyes B (loan)	1	(0)
2020–2021	→ Troyes (loan)	12	(3)
2022–2023	Saint-Étienne	21	(1)
2023–2026	LASK	32	(0)
2026–	Eyüpspor	17	(0)

International career^{‡}
2016	France U16	2	(0)
2017–2018	France U18	7	(3)
2018–2019	France U19	9	(3)
2018–2019	France U20	7	(0)
- * Club domestic league appearances and goals as of 16 August 2026 ‡ National team caps and goals as of 5 June 2022

Lenny Jean-Pierre Pintor (born 5 August 2000) is a French professional footballer who plays as a winger for Turkish Süper Lig club Eyüpspor.

== Club career ==
On 22 August 2017, Pintor signed his first professional contract with Brest committing to a three-year deal after joining from Bastia. At just 17 years old, he made his professional debut for Brest on 15 December 2017, in a 4–1 Ligue 2 win over Quevilly-Rouen.

On 31 August 2018, the final day of the summer transfer window, Pintor joined Ligue 1 side Lyon on a five-year contract, with Brest receiving a transfer fee of €5 million plus €4 million in bonuses and a percentage of any future resale.

Pintor scored on his Youth League debut in an away victory against Manchester City. He also scored in his second Youth League game against Shaktar Donetsk. He made his first full Lyon debut on 19 October 2018, replacing Memphis Depay during the injury time of a 2–0 win against Nîmes.

On 4 August 2022, Pintor joined Lyon's rival Saint-Étienne on a two-year contract. Although he joined the club for free, Lyon will receive 30% of a future transfer fee.

On 26 June 2023, Pintor signed for Austrian Bundesliga club LASK on a three-year contract.

== International career ==
Pintor represented France at the 2017 FIFA U-17 World Cup, and scored in the round of 16 loss to the Spain U17s on 17 October 2017.

== Personal life ==
Born in Metropolitan France, Pintor is of Martiniquais Malagasy descent.

== Career statistics ==
As of match played 13 September 2025

Appearances and goals by club, season and competition
Club	Season	League			National Cup		League Cup		Continental		Other		Total	
Club	Season	Division	Apps	Goals	Apps	Goals	Apps	Goals	Apps	Goals	Apps	Goals	Apps	Goals
Bastia II	2016–17	CFA 3	1	0	—		—		—		—		1	0
Brest	2017–18	Ligue 2	5	0	—		—		—		0	0	5	0
Brest	2018–19	Ligue 2	1	0	0	0	1	0	—		—		2	0
Brest	Total		6	0	0	0	1	0	—		—		7	0
Brest II	2017–18	National 3	8	0	—		—		—		—		8	0
Lyon	2018–19	Ligue 1	1	0	1	0	0	0	—		—		2	0
Lyon II	2018–19	CFA 2	11	5	—		—		—		—		11	5
Lyon II	2020–21	CFA 2	2	0	—		—		—		—		2	0
Lyon II	2020–21	CFA 2	3	0	—		—		—		—		3	0
Lyon II	Total		16	5	—		—		—		—		16	5
Troyes (loan)	2019–20	Ligue 2	19	4	0	0	—		—		—		19	4
Troyes II (loan)	2019–20	CFA 3	1	0	—		—		—		—		1	0
Troyes (loan)	2020–21	Ligue 2	12	3	1	0	—		—		—		13	3
Saint-Étienne	2022–23	Ligue 2	21	1	1	0	—		—		—		22	1
LASK	2023–24	Austrian Bundesliga	21	0	2	0	—		1 (Note: Appearances in UEFA Europa League)	0	—		24	0
LASK	2024–25	Austrian Bundesliga	9	0	1	0	—		2 (Note: Two appearances in UEFA Europa League)	0	—		12	0
LASK	2025–26	Austrian Bundesliga	2	0	1	0	—		0	0	—		3	0
LASK	Total		32	0	4	0	—		3	0	—		39	0
Career total			117	6	7	0	2	0	3	0	0	0	129	9
