= Calvin Bombo =

Central African footballer (born 1999)

Personal information
- Date of birth: 18 January 1999 (age 27)
- Place of birth: Troyes, France
- Height: 1.88 m (6 ft 2 in)
- Position: Midfielder

Team information
- Current team: Linas-Montlhéry

Youth career
- 2006–2009: Chapelains
- 2009–2017: Troyes

Senior career*
Years	Team	Apps	(Gls)
2017–2022	ES Troyes AC	49	(1)
2022—2023	CA Vitry	14	(3)
2023–	Linas-Montlhéry	0	(0)

International career^{‡}
2021	Central African Republic	1	(0)
- * Club domestic league appearances and goals as of 09:56, 30 June 2023 (UTC) ‡ National team caps and goals as of 17:59, 15 January 2022 (UTC)

Calvin Bombo (born 18 January 1999) is a professional footballer who plays as a midfielder for Championnat National 3 club Linas-Montlhéry. Born in France, he represented the Central African Republic at international level.

== Club career ==
In June 2018, Bombo signed his first professional contract with Troyes. He made his professional debut with the club in a 1–0 Coupe de France loss to Auxerre on 19 January 2021. On 6 January 2022, Bombo left Troyes following the termination of his contract.

On 28 June 2023, Bombo signed for Championnat National 3 club Linas-Montlhéry.

== International career ==
Born in France, Bombo is of Central African Republic descent. He was called up to represent the Central African Republic national team for a pair of friendlies in June 2021.
