= Gabriel Mutombo =

French footballer (born 1996)

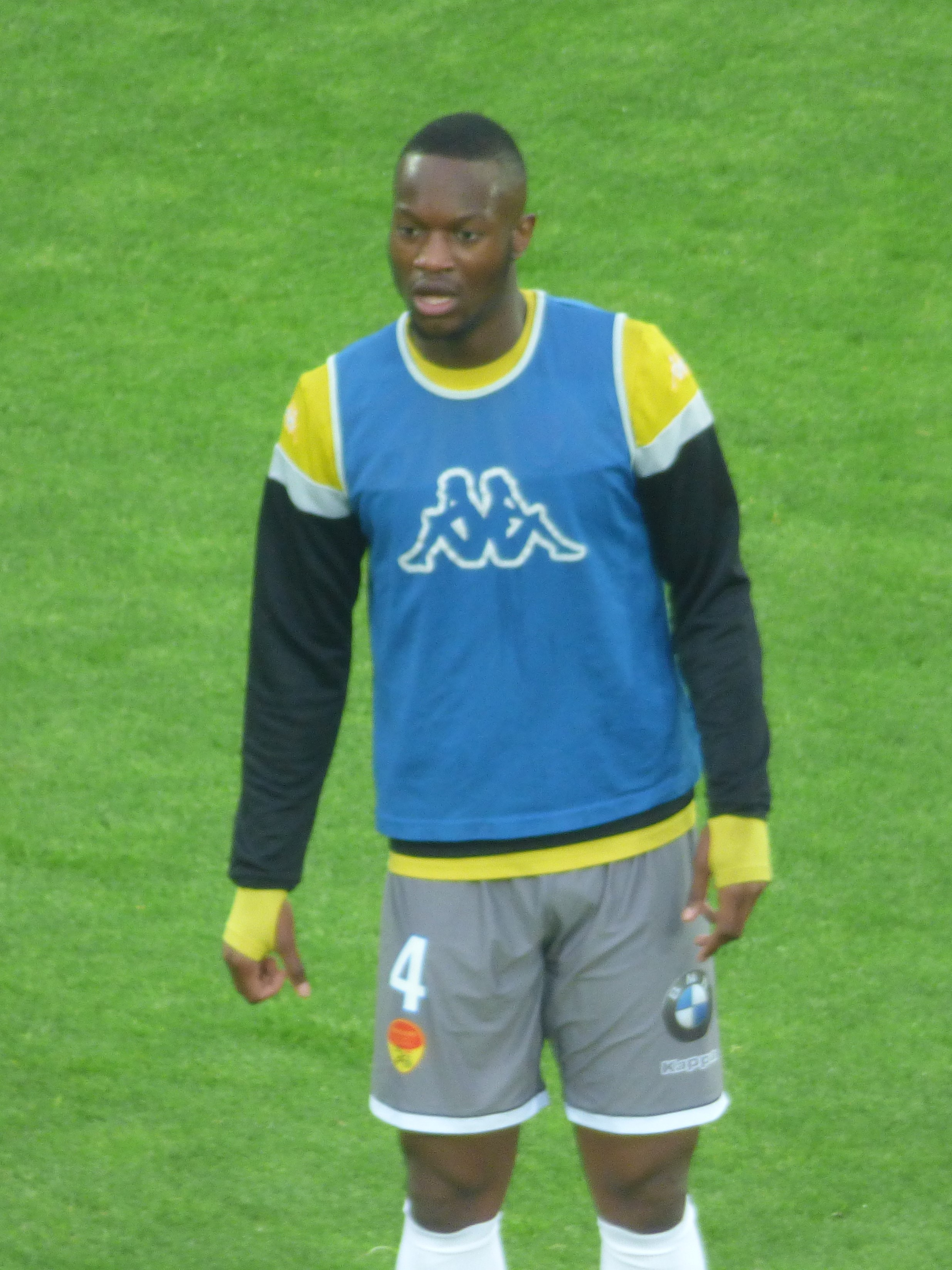
- Mutombo in 2019

Personal information
- Full name: Gabriel Mutombo Kupa
- Date of birth: 19 January 1996 (age 30)
- Place of birth: Villeurbanne, France
- Height: 1.91 m (6 ft 3 in)
- Position: Centre-back

Team information
- Current team: Persib Bandung
- Number: 3

Youth career
- 2002–2012: Lyon
- 2012–2013: Saint-Priest
- 2013–2016: Angers

Senior career*
Years	Team	Apps	(Gls)
2013–2016	Angers B	52	(3)
2016–2018	Angers	0	(0)
2016–2017	→ CA Bastia (loan)	21	(2)
2017–2018	→ Orléans (loan)	16	(1)
2018–2020	Orléans	50	(2)
2020–2022	Troyes	18	(0)
2022	→ Vilafranquense (loan)	10	(0)
2023–2024	Botoșani	31	(1)
2024	Chania	3	(0)
2024–2026	Ratchaburi	47	(2)
2026–	Persib Bandung	4	(0)
- * Club domestic league appearances and goals as of 11 October 2026

Gabriel Mutombo Kupa (born 19 January 1996) is a French professional footballer who plays as a centre-back for Super League club Persib Bandung.

== Club career ==
After ten years in the academy of Olympique Lyonnais, Mutombo was let go and joined the youth teams of Angers SCO. He signed his first professional contract in the summer of 106, before joining CA Bastia on loan for the 2016–17 season, and then joining US Orléans on loan on 28 June 2017 for the 2017–18 season. He made his professional debut for Orléans in a 1–0 Ligue 2 loss to US Quevilly-Rouen on 17 November 2017.

Orléans converted Mutombo's loan into a three-year contract in June 2018.

In August 2020, Mutombo moved to Troyes AC, signing a two-year deal.

On 25 January 2022, he joined Vilafranquense in Portugal on loan.

== International career ==
Born in France, Mutombo is of Congolese descent, and was called up to the DR Congo national under-20 football team for a friendly against the France U20s, but did not make an appearance because he was mourning the death of his brother.

== Honours ==
Troyes

- Ligue 2: 2020–21

Persib Bandung

- Piala Presiden runner-up: 2026
