= Dylan Saint-Louis =

Footballer (born 1995)

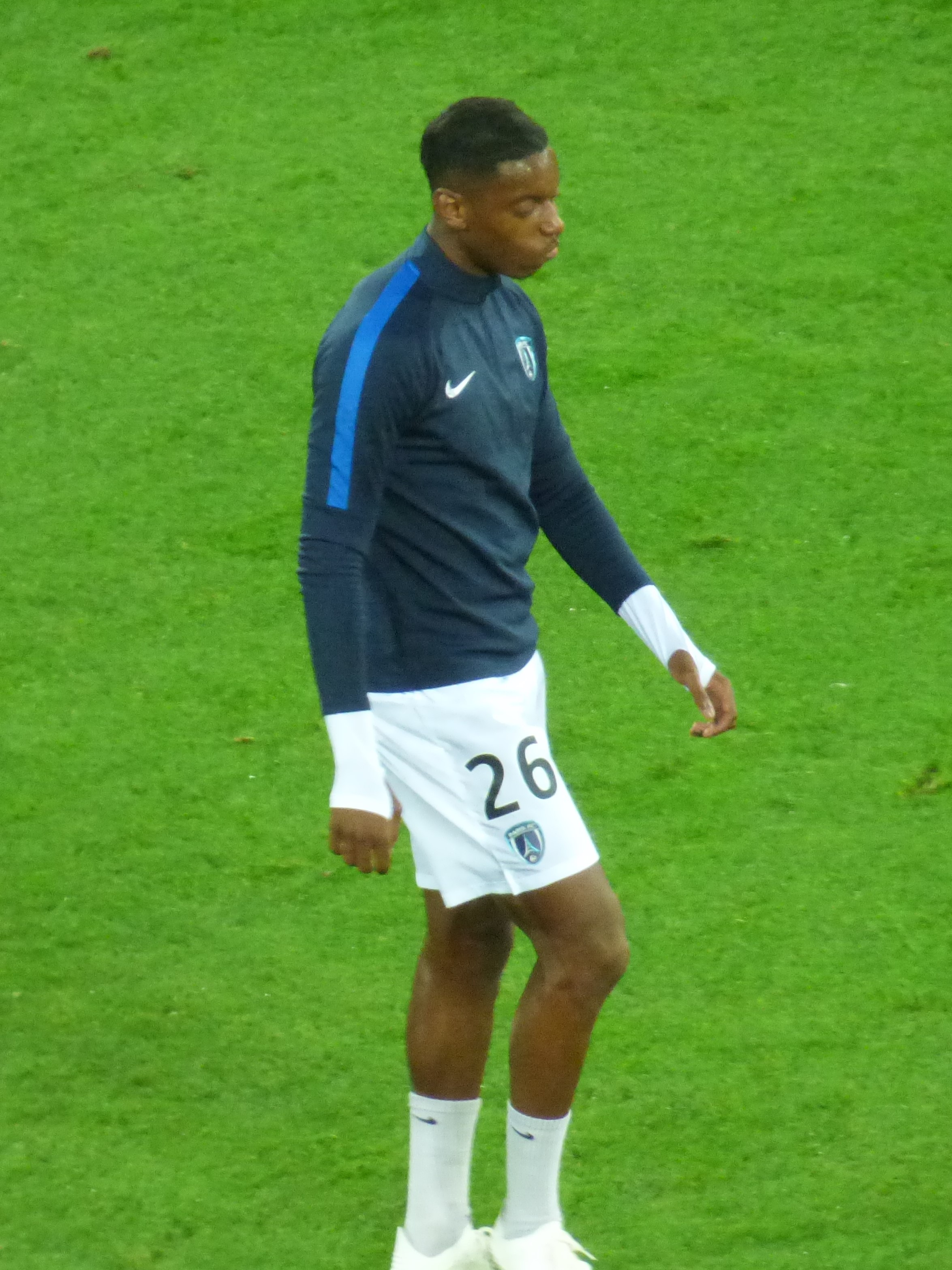
- Saint-Louis in 2018

Personal information
- Date of birth: 26 April 1995 (age 31)
- Place of birth: Gonesse, France
- Height: 1.75 m (5 ft 9 in)
- Position: Forward

Team information
- Current team: IR Tangier
- Number: 9

Youth career
- –2015: Saint-Étienne

Senior career*
Years	Team	Apps	(Gls)
2012–2015	Saint-Étienne II	45	(12)
2015–2017	Saint-Étienne	1	(1)
2016	→ Évian (loan)	6	(1)
2016–2017	→ Laval (loan)	28	(6)
2017–2019	Paris FC	53	(9)
2019–2020	Beerschot	18	(2)
2020–2021	Troyes	38	(5)
2021–2023	Hatayspor	43	(4)
2023–2024	Vizela	15	(1)
2024–2025	Sakaryaspor	14	(2)
2026–	IR Tangier		

International career^{‡}
2017–	Congo	10	(1)
- * Club domestic league appearances and goals as of 1 June 2025 ‡ National team caps and goals as of 13 August 2023

Dylan Saint-Louis (born 26 April 1995) is a professional footballer who plays as a forward. Born in France, he represents Congo at international level.

== Club career ==
Saint-Louis is a youth exponent from Saint-Étienne. He made his Coupe de la Ligue debut on 16 December 2015 against Paris Saint-Germain playing the full game.

On 31 August 2016, Saint-Louis joined Ligue 2 side Laval on a season-long loan deal.

On 23 June 2019, Saint-Louis departed Paris FC for Belgian team Beerschot, signing a three-year deal.

On 2 August 2021, he signed a three-year contract with Hatayspor in Turkey.

On 26 July 2023, Primeira Liga side Vizela announced the signing of Saint-Louis on a two-year contract.

== International career ==
Saint-Louis was called-up by Congo on 19 May 2017. He was part of a 43-man preliminary squad to compete in the Africa Cup of Nations qualifier against DR Congo on 10 June, but did not cap. He made his formal debut for Congo in a 2–1 2018 World Cup qualification loss to Egypt national football team on 8 October 2017.

== Personal life ==
Saint-Louis is of Congolese and Haitian descent.

== Career statistics ==
Scores and results list Congo's goal tally first, score column indicates score after each Saint-Louis goal.

List of international goals scored by Dylan Saint-Louis
No.	Date	Venue	Opponent	Score	Result	Competition
1	8 November 2017	Stade Municipal de Kintélé, Brazzaville, Congo	Benin	1–0	1–1	Friendly

== Honours ==
Individual

- UNFP Ligue 2 Player of the Month: January 2018
