= Florian Tardieu =

French footballer (born 1992)

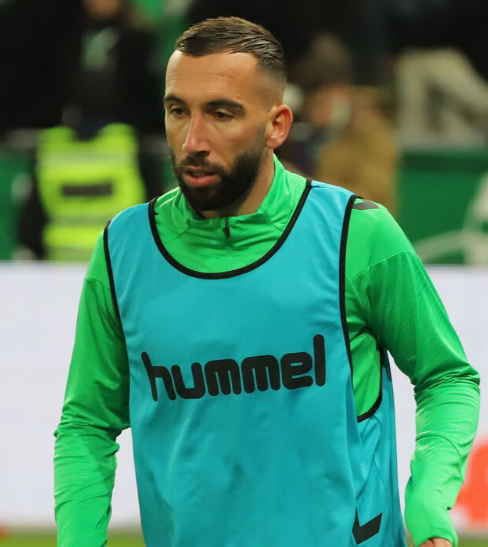
- Tardieu in 2024

Personal information
- Date of birth: 22 April 1992 (age 34)
- Place of birth: Istres, France
- Height: 1.84 m (6 ft 0 in)
- Position: Midfielder

Team information
- Current team: Montpellier
- Number: 5

Senior career*
Years	Team	Apps	(Gls)
2011–2014	Istres	61	(5)
2014–2018	Sochaux	134	(2)
2018–2019	Zulte-Waregem	22	(0)
2019–2023	Troyes	106	(17)
2023–2026	Saint-Étienne	78	(7)
2026–	Montpellier	0	(0)
- * Club domestic league appearances and goals as of 11 May 2026

Florian Tardieu (born 22 April 1992) is a French professional footballer who plays as a midfielder for Ligue 2 club Montpellier.

== Career ==
Tardieu made his debut for FC Istres, his first professional club, in the 1–0 win against Bastia on 18 May 2012, coming on as a late substitute for Laurent Agouazi. Tardieu scored his first senior goal in the 1–0 home victory over Chamois Niortais on 31 August 2012 on his first league start for Istres. Tardieu signed for French second tier FC Sochaux in the summer of 2014 for four years.

He then signed for three years in June 2018 for Belgian first tier Zulte Waregem.

On 8 July 2026, Tardieu signed with Montpellier in Ligue 2 for two seasons.
