= Yoann Touzghar =

Footballer (born 1986)

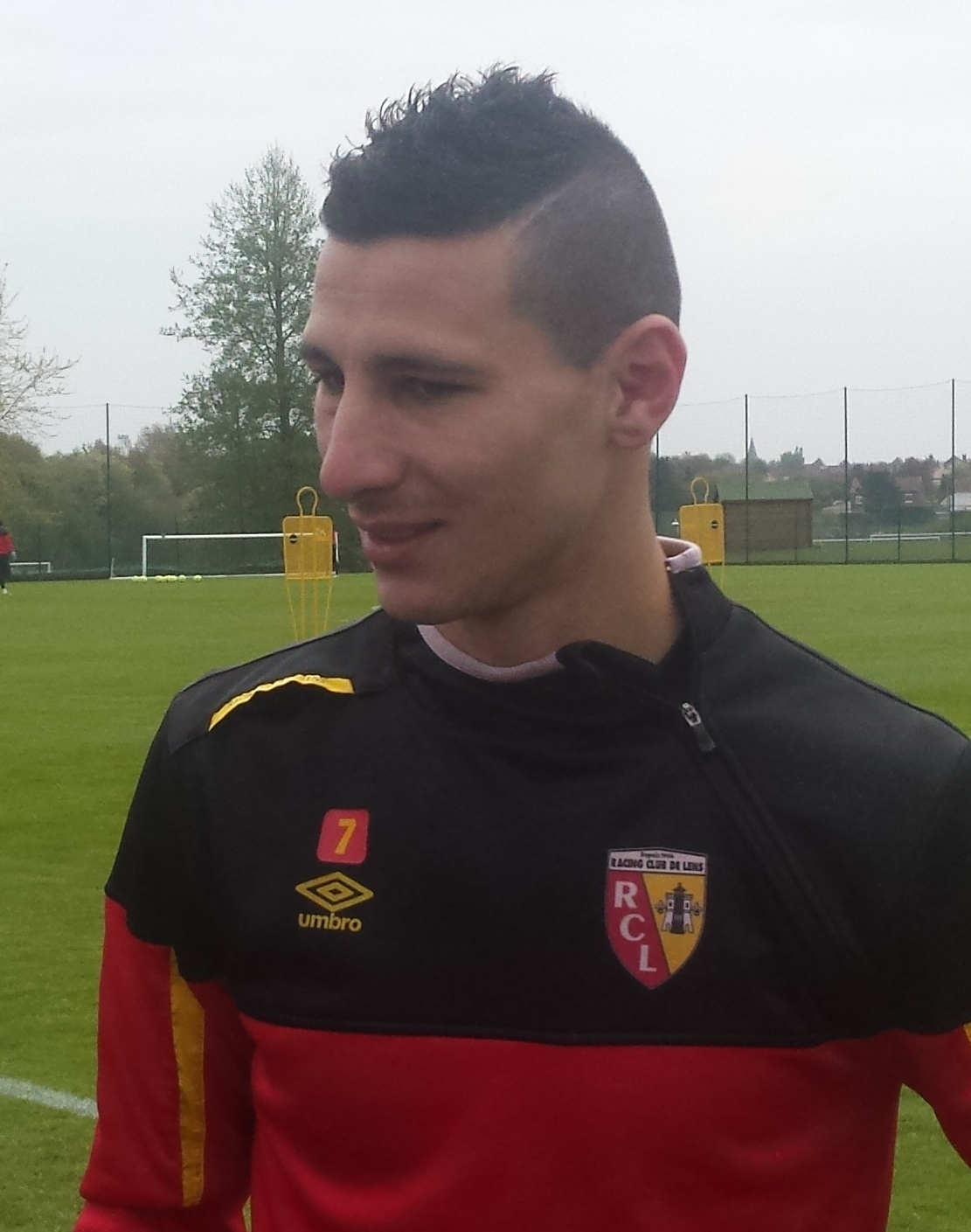
- Touzghar with Lens in 2015

Personal information
- Date of birth: 28 November 1986 (age 39)
- Place of birth: Avignon, France
- Height: 1.80 m (5 ft 11 in)
- Position: Forward

Youth career
- Monaco
- Cannes

Senior career*
Years	Team	Apps	(Gls)
2005–2010	Grasse		
2010–2013	Amiens	68	(15)
2012–2013	→ Lens (loan)	24	(11)
2013–2015	Lens	88	(33)
2015–2016	Club Africain	6	(1)
2016	Auxerre	13	(3)
2017–2018	Sochaux	48	(7)
2018–2022	Troyes	114	(38)
2022–2025	Ajaccio	48	(6)
Total		409+	(114+)

International career
2015–2022	Tunisia	6	(1)
- * Club domestic league appearances and goals

Yoann Touzghar (born 28 November 1986) is a former professional footballer who played as a forward. Born in France, he played for the Tunisia national team.

== Club career ==
In the 2015–16 season Touzghar played for Club Africain scoring once in six matches.

On 5 July 2016, Touzghar joined Auxerre on a two-year contract plus an option amid reported interest from Reims and Gazélec Ajaccio.

On 24 August 2022, Touzghar signed a two-year contract with Ajaccio.

== International career ==
Touzghar was born in France to a Moroccan father and Tunisian mother. He played for the Tunisia national team at the 2021 Africa Cup of Nations.

== Personal life ==
Yoann's younger half-brother Rayan Touzghar is also a professional footballer.

== International goals ==
Scores and results list Tunisia's goal tally first, score column indicates score after each Touzghar goal.

List of international goals scored by Yoann Touzghar
No.	Date	Venue	Opponent	Score	Result	Competition
1	12 June 2015	Stade Olympique de Radès, Radès, Tunisia	Djibouti	8–1	8–1	2017 Africa Cup of Nations qualification
