= Levi Lumeka =

English footballer

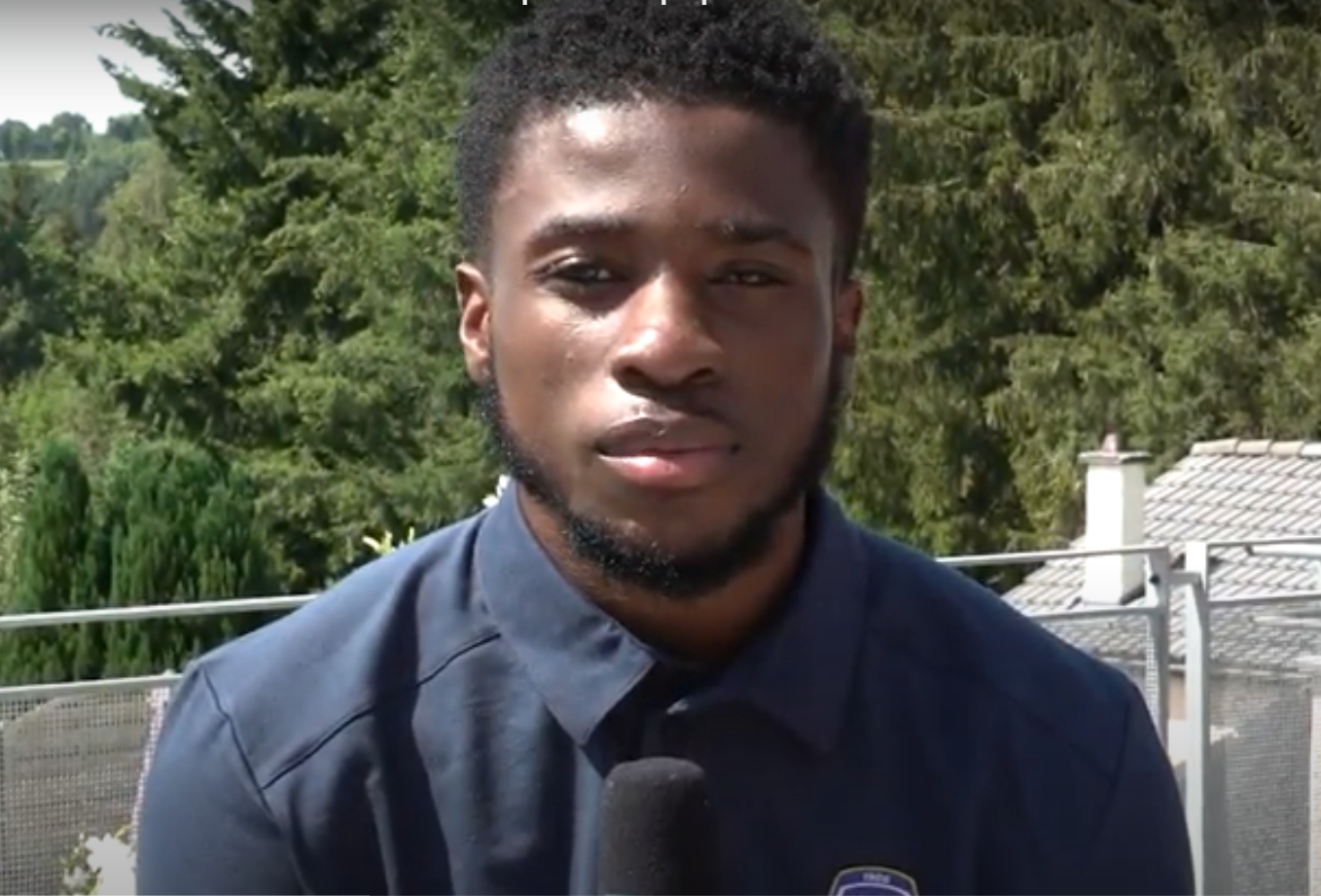
- Lumeka in 2020

Personal information
- Full name: Levi Jeremiah Lumeka
- Date of birth: 5 September 1998 (age 28)
- Place of birth: Beckton, England
- Height: 5 ft 7 in (1.70 m)
- Position: Winger

Youth career
- Chelsea
- Crystal Palace

Senior career*
Years	Team	Apps	(Gls)
2017–2019	Crystal Palace	1	(0)
2018–2019	→ Leyton Orient (loan)	1	(0)
2019–2020	Varzim	23	(8)
2020–2023	Troyes	20	(2)
2021	Troyes II	2	(0)
2022	→ Vilafranquense (loan)	10	(0)
2023–2024	Oxford City	6	(1)
2025–2026	Bala Town	10	(0)
- * Club domestic league appearances and goals as of 09:33, 18 February 2026 (UTC)

Levi Jeremiah Lumeka (born 5 September 1998) is an English professional footballer who plays as a winger.

== Career ==
Coming through the youth ranks at Crystal Palace, he signed his first professional contract in December 2015. On 10 September 2017, he made his debut as a substitute against Burnley in the Premier League, playing the final 25 minutes of a 1–0 away loss as a substitute for Lee Chung-yong.

On 31 August 2018, Lumeka signed for National League side Leyton Orient on loan until the end of the 2018–19 season. He was recalled from the loan on 9 January 2019 having made only one appearance for Orient, as an added-time replacement for Jobi McAnuff in a 3–0 home win over Solihull Moors on 4 September.

On 20 June 2019, Lumeka joined LigaPro side Varzim S.C. on a two-year deal. He made his debut on 10 August in the first game of the season, a goalless home draw with U.D. Oliveirense in which he replaced Felipe Augusto with 14 minutes left, and scored his first career goal on 30 October to equalise in a 1–1 draw at C.D. Nacional.

On 28 July 2020, Lumeka joined Ligue 2 side Troyes AC on a four-year deal.

On 25 January 2022, Lumeka returned to Portugal to join Vilafranquense on loan until the end of the season.

In August 2023, he agreed to mutually terminate his contract with Troyes.

On 23 December 2023, Lumeka joined Oxford City.

In August 2025 he joined Bala Town. He made his club debut on 8 August 2025 in a Cymru Premier match.

== Personal life ==
Born in England, Lumeka is of Congolese descent. Lumeka said in August 2020 that he probably wouldn't turn down a call up from DR Congo, but still holds out hope of earning an England call up at some point in the future.
