= Mahamadou Dembélé =

French footballer (born 1999)

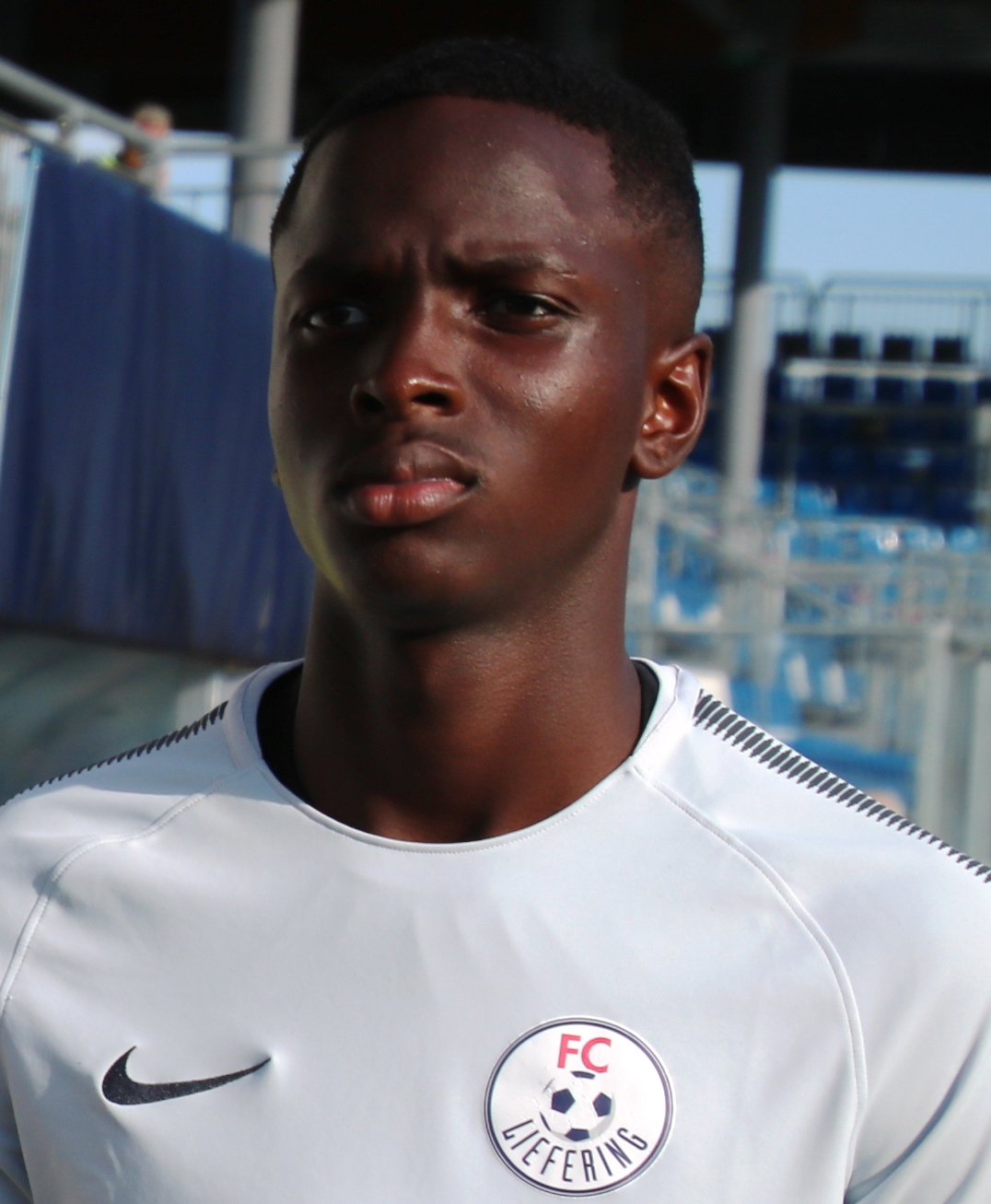
- Dembélé in 2017

Personal information
- Date of birth: 10 April 1999 (age 27)
- Place of birth: Brétigny-sur-Orge, France
- Height: 1.86 m (6 ft 1 in)
- Position: Centre back

Team information
- Current team: Le Puy-en-Velay
- Number: 5

Youth career
- 2006–2012: CSF Brétigny
- 2012–2017: Paris Saint-Germain

Senior career*
Years	Team	Apps	(Gls)
2016–2017	Paris Saint-Germain B	2	(1)
2017–2019	Red Bull Salzburg	10	(0)
2017–2019	Liefering	40	(3)
2019	→ Fortuna Sittard (loan)	3	(0)
2019–2022	Troyes	7	(0)
2021–2022	→ Pau (loan)	43	(0)
2022–2024	Seraing	23	(1)
2024–2026	Tirana	46	(1)
2026	Dinamo Samarqand	10	(0)
2026–	Le Puy	4	(0)

International career^{‡}
2014	France U16	2	(0)
2015–2016	France U17	3	(0)
2016–2017	France U18	12	(1)
2017–2018	France U19	12	(0)
2018	France U20	4	(0)
- * Club domestic league appearances and goals as of 5 September 2026 ‡ National team caps and goals as of 20:40, 14 September 2019 (UTC)

Mahamadou Dembélé (born 10 April 1999) is a French professional footballer who plays as a defender for Ligue 3 club Le Puy.

== Career ==
=== Red Bull Salzburg ===
In January 2019, he joined Fortuna Sittard on loan until the end of the season. In April 2019, Dembélé sustained a serious knee injury during training and returned to Salzburg.

=== Troyes ===
In August 2019, he joined Troyes AC from Red Bull Salzburg.

=== Seraing ===
On 7 September 2022, Dembélé signed a two-year contract with Seraing in Belgian Pro League.

=== Dinamo Samarqand ===
On 7 February 2026, he signed a one year contract with the Uzbekistan Super League club Dinamo Samarqand.

== Personal life ==
Dembélé was born in Brétigny-sur-Orge, France and has French nationality. He is of Malian descent.
