= Terence Baya =

French footballer (1998)

Personal information
- Date of birth: 12 January 1998 (age 28)
- Place of birth: Longjumeau, France
- Height: 1.81 m (5 ft 11 in)
- Position: Left-back

Youth career
- 2004–2011: Les Ulis
- 2011–2016: Caen

Senior career*
Years	Team	Apps	(Gls)
2016	Caen B	1	(0)
2016–2017	Belfort	21	(0)
2017–2018	Brescia	0	(0)
2018–2019	Avranches	23	(0)
2018–2019	Avranches B	2	(0)
2019–2021	Troyes	10	(1)
2019–2021	Troyes B	5	(0)
2021–2024	Vendsyssel	26	(0)
- * Club domestic league appearances and goals as of 17 April 2024

Terence Baya (born 12 January 1998) is a French professional footballer who plays as left-back.

== Career ==
Previously a professional with Brescia in the Italian Serie B, Baya moved to US Avranches in 2018. He then transferred to Troyes in 2019, signing a contract for three years. Baya made his professional debut with Troyes in a 2–0 Ligue 2 win over Chamois Niortais on 26 July 2019.

On 8 August 2021, Baya joined Danish 1st Division club Vendsyssel FF. Baya left the club in June 2024.

== Personal life ==
Born in France, Baya is of Congolese descent.
