= Sébastien Renot =

French footballer

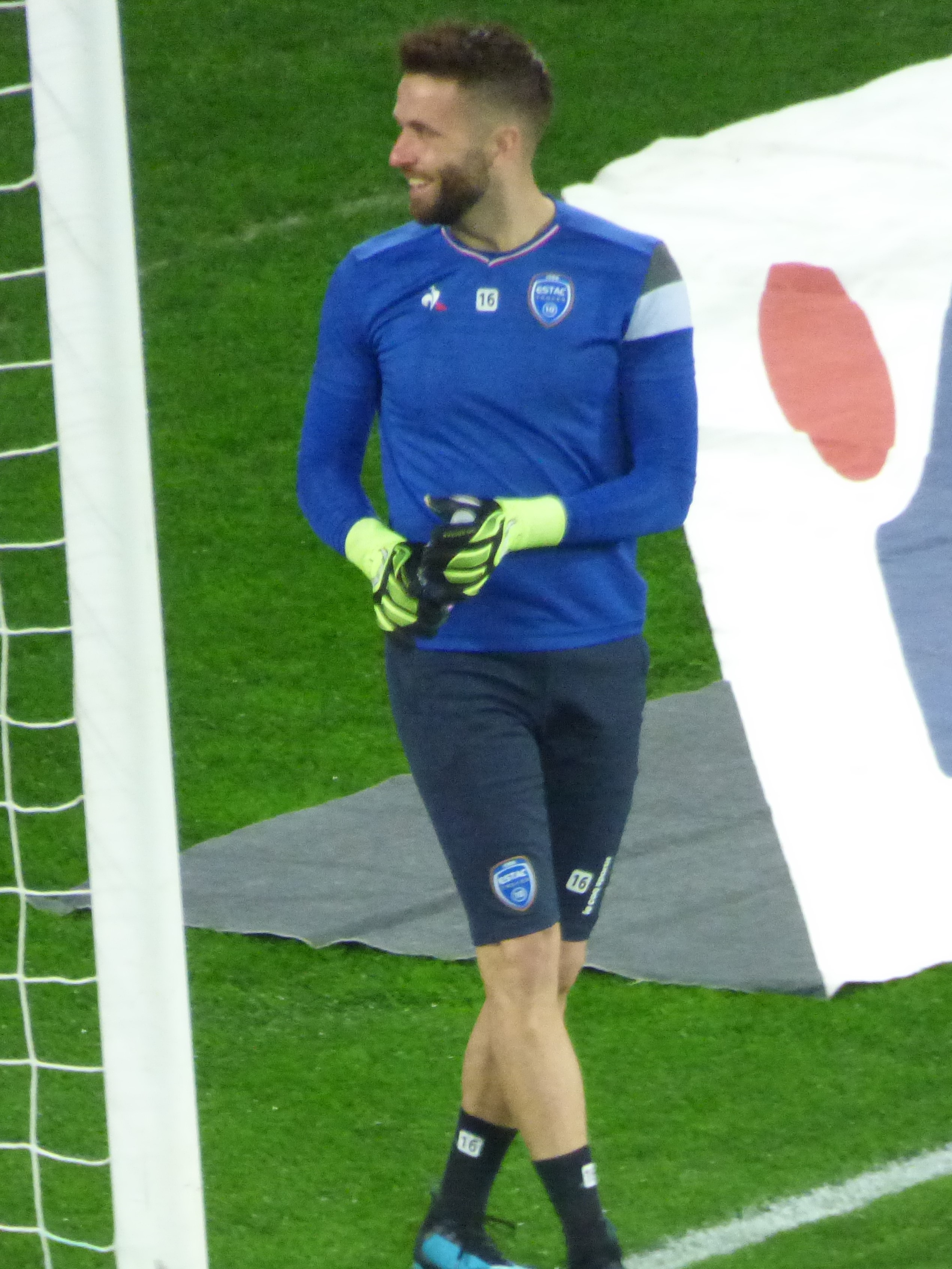
- Renot in 2020 with Troyes

Personal information
- Date of birth: 11 November 1987 (age 39)
- Place of birth: Dijon, France
- Height: 1.85 m (6 ft 1 in)
- Position: Goalkeeper

Senior career*
Years	Team	Apps	(Gls)
2011–2013	Paris Saint-Germain B	0	(0)
2013–2017	Poissy	46	(1)
2017–2019	Red Star	43	(0)
2019–2022	Troyes	6	(0)
2019–2022	Troyes B	3	(0)
2022–2026	Versailles	94	(1)
2025	Versailles B	2	(0)
- * Club domestic league appearances and goals as of 12 December 2025

Sébastien Renot (born 11 November 1989) is a French professional footballer who plays as a goalkeeper.

== Club career ==
In June 2022, Renot signed with Versailles.

He scored a goal in a 2–1 win against Sedan at the 94th minute on 21 April 2023.
