= 2020–21 LB Châteauroux season =

LB Châteauroux
2020–21 season
- Chairman: Michel Denisot
- Manager: Nicolas Usaï (until 13 December); Benoît Cauet (from 1 January to 10 March); Marco Simone (from 10 March)
- Stadium: Stade Gaston Petit
- Ligue 2: 20th (relegated)
- Coupe de France: Eighth round
- Top goalscorer: League: Romain Grange (6); All: Romain Grange (6)
Home colours	Away colours	Third colours

The 2020–21 LB Châteauroux season was the club's 105th season in existence and its club's fourth consecutive season in the second division of French football. In addition to the domestic league, Châteauroux participated in this season's edition of the Coupe de France. The season covered the period from 1 July 2020 to 30 June 2021.

== Players ==
=== First-team squad ===
As of 11 February 2021.

Note: Flags indicate national team as defined under FIFA eligibility rules; some limited exceptions apply. Players may hold more than one non-FIFA nationality.

No.	Pos.	Nation	Player
1	GK	FRA	Julien Fabri
2	DF	CIV	Ibrahim Cissé (on loan from Nice)
3	DF	CMR	Yannick M'Boné (captain)
4	MF	COD	Rémi Mulumba
6	DF	FRA	Leandro Morante
7	MF	FRA	Amir Nouri
9	FW	FRA	Yanis Merdji
10	FW	FRA	Guevin Tormin
11	FW	TOG	Razak Boukari
12	DF	FRA	Nama Fofana
13	FW	CGO	Prince Ibara
14	FW	FRA	Alexis Gonçalves
15	MF	FRA	Romain Grange
16	GK	FRA	Rémi Pillot
17	MF	FRA	Issa Marega

No.	Pos.	Nation	Player
18	FW	TOG	Gilles Sunu
19	MF	GBS	Opa Sanganté
20	DF	FRA	Alexandre Raineau
21	DF	CIV	Christopher Operi
22	FW	SEN	Philippe Paulin Keny
23	MF	FRA	Kalidou Sidibé
24	DF	COM	Chaker Alhadhur
25	FW	FRA	Ilyas Chouaref
26	MF	FRA	Baptiste Canelhas
27	MF	FRA	Léo Leroy
28	DF	GLP	Jérémy Cordoval
29	FW	FRA	Siriné Doucouré
30	GK	CMR	Wilfried Bedfian
40	GK	POL	Marcin Bułka

=== Out on loan ===
Note: Flags indicate national team as defined under FIFA eligibility rules; some limited exceptions apply. Players may hold more than one non-FIFA nationality.

No.	Pos.	Nation	Player
—	FW	FRA	Andrew Jung (on loan to Quevilly-Rouen)

== Pre-season and friendlies ==
Win Draw Loss

16 July 2020 Friendly	Rennes (France)	3–0	(France) Châteauroux	Rennes, France
18:00 CEST (UTC+2)	Terrier 15'; Raphinha 62'; Rutter 64'		Cissé (yellow card) 83'	Stadium: Centre d’entraînement Henri-Guérin; Referee: Amaury Delerue

22 July 2020 Friendly	Châteauroux (France)	Cancelled	(France) Niort	Châteauroux, France
14:00 CEST (UTC+2)				Stadium: Stade Gaston Petit

1 August 2020 Friendly	Châteauroux (France)	Cancelled	(France) US Orléans	Châteauroux, France
14:00 CEST (UTC+2)				Stadium: Stade Gaston Petit

5 August 2020 Friendly	Clermont (France)	3–1	(France) Châteauroux	Clermont-Ferrand, France
19:00 CEST (UTC+2)	Tell 32' (pen.), 36', 61'		Sunu 3'	Stadium: Stade Gabriel Montpied

9 August 2020 Friendly	SO Romorantin (France)	0–2	(France) Châteauroux	Romorantin-Lanthenay, France
18:00 CEST (UTC+2)			Grange 38' (pen.), 44'	Stadium: Stade Jules Ladoumègue

14 August 2020 Friendly	Châteauroux (France)	0–2	(France) Sporting Club Lyon	Châteauroux, France
19:00 CEST (UTC+2)			Pierre-Charles 42' (pen.); Botella 73' (pen.)	Stadium: Stade Gaston Petit

4 September 2020 Friendly	Angers (France)	6–1	(France) Châteauroux	Saumur, France
15:00 CEST (UTC+2)

== Competitions ==
=== Overview ===
Competition	First match	Last match	Starting round	Final position	Record							
Competition	First match	Last match	Starting round	Final position	Pld	W	D	L	GF	GA	GD	Win %
Ligue 2	22 August 2020	15 May 2021	Matchday 1	20th	38	4	11	23	32	58	−26	10.53
Coupe de France	19 January 2021		Eighth round	Eighth round	1	0	0	1	0	2	−2	0.00
Total					39	4	11	24	32	60	−28	10.26

Source: Soccerway

=== Ligue 2 ===
==== League table ====
Pos	Team	Pld	W	D	L	GF	GA	GD	Pts	Promotion or Relegation
16	Dunkerque	38	10	11	17	34	47	−13	41	
17	Caen	38	9	14	15	34	49	−15	41	
18	Niort (O)	38	9	14	15	34	58	−24	41	Qualification for the relegation play-offs
19	Chambly (R)	38	9	11	18	41	64	−23	38	Relegation to Championnat National
20	Châteauroux (R)	38	4	11	23	32	58	−26	23	Relegation to Championnat National

Source: Ligue 2
Rules for classification: 1) Points; 2) Goal difference; 3) Number of goals scored; 4) Head-to-head goal difference; 5) Fair play points
(O) Play-off winners; (R) Relegated

==== Results summary ====
Overall								Home						Away					
Pld	W	D	L	GF	GA	GD	Pts	W	D	L	GF	GA	GD	W	D	L	GF	GA	GD
38	4	11	23	32	58	−26	23	3	5	11	21	31	−10	1	6	12	11	27	−16

Source: Ligue 2

==== Results by round ====
Round	1	2	3	4	5	6	7	8	9	10	11	12	13	14	15	16	17	18	19	20	21	22	23	24	25	26	27	28	29	30	31	32	33	34	35	36	37	38
Ground	A	H	A	H	A	H	A	H	A	H	H	A	H	A	H	A	H	A	H	A	H	A	H	A	H	A	H	A	A	H	A	H	A	H	A	H	A	H
Result	W	L	L	D	L	W	D	L	L	L	W	D	L	L	L	D	L	L	L	L	D	L	W	D	L	L	L	L	D	D	D	L	L	D	L	L	L	D
Position	5	10	14	15	18	20	20	20	20	20	20	20	20	20	20	20	20	20	20	20	20	20	20	20	20	20	20	20	20	20	20	20	20	20	20	20	20	20

Source: Ligue 2
A = Away; H = Home; W = Win; D = Draw; L = Loss

==== Matches ====
The league fixtures were announced on 9 July 2020.

22 August 2020 1	Ajaccio	0–1	Châteauroux	Ajaccio
19:00 CEST (UTC+2)		Report	Nouri 78'	Stadium: Stade François Coty; Referee: Benjamin Lepaysant

29 August 2020 2	Châteauroux	1–2	Auxerre	Châteauroux
19:00 CEST (UTC+2)	Mulumba 66'	Report	Autret 59'; Begraoui 90'	Stadium: Stade Gaston Petit; Referee: Pierre Gaillouste

12 September 2020 3	Valenciennes	1–0	Châteauroux	Valenciennes
19:00 CEST (UTC+2)	Chevalier 67'	Report		Stadium: Stade du Hainaut; Referee: Sylvain Palhies

19 September 2020 4	Châteauroux	0–0	Amiens	Châteauroux
19:00 CEST (UTC+2)		Report		Stadium: Stade Gaston Petit; Attendance: 4,612; Referee: Alexandre Perreau Niel

26 September 2020 5	Chambly	2–1	Châteauroux	Beauvais
19:00 CEST (UTC+2)	Jaques 53'; Correa 76'	Report	Keny 45+2'	Stadium: Stade Pierre Brisson; Attendance: 1,338; Referee: Abdelatif Kherradji

3 October 2020 6	Châteauroux	2–0	Niort	Châteauroux
19:00 CEST (UTC+2)	Tormin 37'; Grange (yellow card) 49'; Sanganté (yellow card) 77'; Mulumba 87'; Cissé (yellow card) 90+2'	Report	Louiserre (yellow card) 86'	Stadium: Stade Gaston Petit; Referee: Mehdi Mokhtari

17 October 2020 7	Le Havre	1–1	Châteauroux	Le Havre
19:00 CEST (UTC+2)	Bentil 8', (yellow card) 65'; Ersoy (yellow card) 54'	Report	Sunu 16'; Opa Sanganté (yellow card) 29'; Mulumba (yellow card) 58'	Stadium: Stade Océane; Referee: Mathieu Vernice

24 October 2020 8	Châteauroux	1–2	Paris FC	Châteauroux
19:00 CEST (UTC+2)	Fofana (yellow card) 11'; Cissé (yellow card) 20'; Grange 45+2'; Mulumba (yellow card) 51'; Operi (yellow card) 55'	Report	Belaud (yellow card) 7'; Laura 20' (pen.); Cissé 31' (o.g.); Kanté (yellow card) 90+2'	Stadium: Stade Gaston Petit; Referee: Romain Delpech

31 October 2020 9	Nancy	2–1	Châteauroux	Tomblaine
20:00 CET (UTC+1)	Bassi 54'; Coulibaly 71'; Latouchent (yellow card) 86'; Biron (yellow card) 90+1'	Report	Grange (yellow card) 8', (goal) 15'	Stadium: Stade Marcel Picot; Referee: Guillaume Paradis

7 November 2020 10	Châteauroux	0–3	Pau	Châteauroux
19:00 CEST (UTC+2)	Sanganté (yellow card) 77' (yellow-red card) 78'	Report	Assifuah 9', 40'; Daubin (yellow card) 18'; Armand 33'; Sabaly (yellow card) 45+2'; Kouassi (yellow card) 87'	Stadium: Stade Gaston Petit; Referee: Mehdi Mokhtari

21 November 2020 11	Châteauroux	2–1	Sochaux	Châteauroux
19:00 CET (UTC+1)	Fofana (yellow card) 24'; Opéri (yellow card) 75'; Sunu 90+1'; Gonçalves 90+3'	Report	Lasme 18'; Lopy (yellow card) 49'	Stadium: Stade Gaston Petit; Referee: Bartolomeu Varela

28 November 2020 12	Caen	1–1	Châteauroux	Caen
19:00 (CET) (UTC+1)	Bammou 74' (pen.); Rivierez (yellow card) 75'	Report	Nouri 66'; Leroy (yellow card) 74'	Stadium: Stade Michel d'Ornano; Referee: Romain Lissorgue

1 December 2020 13	Châteauroux	0–1	Grenoble	Châteauroux
19:00 CET (UTC+1)	Cissé (yellow card) 42' (yellow-red card) 77'	Report	Ravet (yellow card) 77'; Straalman (yellow card) 83'; Diallo 87'	Stadium: Stade Gaston Petit; Referee: Olivier Thual

5 December 2020 14	Dunkerque	2–0	Châteauroux	Dunkerque
19:00 CET (UTC+1)	Diarra 44', 55'; Tchokounté (yellow card) 45+2'; Maraval (yellow card) 72'	Report	Cordoval (yellow card) 19'; Mulumba (yellow card) 69'; M'Boné (yellow card) 90'	Stadium: Stade Marcel-Tribut; Referee: Nicolas Rainville

12 December 2020 15	Châteauroux	0–3	Toulouse	Châteauroux
19:00 CET (UTC+1)	M'Boné (yellow card) 42'; Cissé (yellow card) 65'; Fofana (yellow card) 70'; Leroy (yellow card) 90+1'	Report	Machado (yellow card) 18'; Spierings 37' (pen.); Healey 65'; Antiste 85'	Stadium: Stade Gaston Petit; Referee: Mathieu Vernice

18 December 2020 16	Rodez	1–1	Châteauroux	Rodez
20:00 CET (UTC+1)	Henry (yellow card) 28'; Boissier (yellow card) 47', (goal) 62'	Report	Sanganté (yellow card) 9'; Cordoval (yellow card) 54'; Mulumba (yellow card) 57'; Boukari 68'	Stadium: Stade Paul-Lignon; Referee: Romain Delpech

22 December 2020 17	Châteauroux	0–1	Clermont	Châteauroux
19:00 CET (UTC+1)	Opéri (yellow card) 77'	Report	Allevinah 11'; Magnin (yellow card) 90+4'	Stadium: Stade Gaston Petit; Referee: Mehdi Mokhtari

5 January 2021 18	Troyes	2–0	Châteauroux	Troyes
20:00 CET (UTC+1)	Gory (yellow card) 53'; Cissé 77' (o.g.); Pintor 84'	Report	Cissé (yellow card) 45'; Cordoval (yellow card) 61' (yellow-red card) 80'	Stadium: Stade de l'Aube; Referee: Guillaume Paradis

8 January 2021 19	Châteauroux	2–3	Guingamp	Châteauroux
20:00 CEST (UTC+1)	Mulumba (yellow card) 38', (goal) 78'; Operi 79'; Morante (yellow card) 90'	Report	Rodelin 59'; Pierrot 67', (yellow card) 90'; Ngbakoto 74'; Roux (yellow card) 88'	Stadium: Stade Gaston Petit; Referee: Nicolas Rainville

16 January 2021 20	Auxerre	4–1	Châteauroux	Auxerre
19:00 (CET) (UTC+1)	Fortuné 9'; Sakhi 67'; Hein 79'; Begraoui 90'	Report	Merdji 36'	Stadium: Stade de l'Abbé-Deschamps; Referee: Eric Wattellier

23 January 2021 21	Châteauroux	3–3	Valenciennes	Châteauroux
19:00 CET (UTC+1)	Ntim 9' (o.g.); Gonçalves (yellow card) 34', (goal) 90'; Chouaref 57'; Leroy (yellow card) 62'; Sunu (yellow card) 70'; Mulumba (yellow card) 76'; Fofana (yellow card) 83'	Report	Guillaume (yellow card) 36'; Cuffaut 47', 73'; Ntim 83'	Stadium: Stade Gaston Petit; Referee: Remi Landry

30 January 2021 22	Amiens	1–0	Châteauroux	Amiens
19:00 CET (UTC+1)	Odey 38', (yellow card) 90'; Lomotey (yellow card) 71'	Report	Canelhas (yellow card) 11'; Mulumba (yellow card) 73'; Opéri (yellow card) 86'	Stadium: Stade de la Licorne; Referee: Romain Lissorgue

2 February 2021 23	Châteauroux	4–0	Chambly	Châteauroux
20:00 CET (UTC+1)	Mulumba (yellow card) 47'; Ibara (yellow card) 52'; Grange 55' (pen.); Doucouré 72', 88'; Merdji 85'	Report	Derrien (red card) 44'; Pinot (yellow card) 54'; Heinry (yellow card) 67'	Stadium: Stade Gaston Petit; Referee: Arnaud Baert

5 February 2021 24	Niort	1–1	Châteauroux	Niort
20:00 CET (UTC+1)	Conté (yellow card) 59'; Boutobba 68'	Report	Ibara 14', (yellow card) 25'; Keny (yellow card) 49'; Mulumba (yellow card) 56'	Stadium: Stade René Gaillard; Referee: Guillaume Paradis

13 February 2021 25	Châteauroux	0–1	Le Havre	Châteauroux
19:00 CET (UTC+1)	Sidibé (yellow card) 23'; Vargas (yellow card) 66'	Report	Alioui (yellow card) 50'; Lekhal (yellow card) 63'; Bonnet 67' (pen.)	Stadium: Stade Gaston Petit; Referee: Stéphanie Frappart

20 February 2021 26	Paris FC	1–0	Châteauroux	Paris
19:00 CET (UTC+1)	Kanté (yellow card) 48'; Abdi 69'; Caddy (yellow card) 88'	Report	Leroy (yellow card) 26'; Opéri (yellow card) 39'; Mulumba (yellow card) 77'; Keny (red card) 84'	Stadium: Stade Sébastien Charléty; Referee: Benjamin Lepaysant

27 February 2021 27	Châteauroux	1–4	Nancy	Châteauroux
19:00 CET (UTC+1)	Fofana (yellow card) 25'; Sidibé (yellow card) 47'; Opéri (yellow card) 62'; Ibara 72'	Report	Karamoko (yellow card) 27'; Biron 31', 41', 48'; Scheidler 63'	Stadium: Stade Gaston Petit; Referee: Olivier Thual

2 March 2021 28	Pau	1–0	Châteauroux	Pau
20:00 CET (UTC+1)	Daubin (yellow card) 27'; Assifuah (yellow card) 53'; Sadzoute (yellow card) 56'; George 58'	Report	Grange (yellow card) 20'; Opéri (yellow card) 43'; Ibara (yellow card) 85'	Stadium: Stade du Hameau; Referee: Arnaud Baert

13 March 2021 29	Sochaux	0–0	Châteauroux	Montbéliard
20:00 CET (UTC+1)	Thioune (yellow card) 61'	Report	Mulumba (yellow card) 21'; Sunu (yellow card) 31'; Sidibé (yellow card) 48'	Stadium: Stade Auguste Bonal; Referee: Nicolas Rainville

20 March 2021 30	Châteauroux	2–2	Caen	Châteauroux
19:00 CET (UTC+1)	Tormin 9'; Grange 13' (pen.)	Report	Jeannot 4', 28'	Stadium: Stade Gaston Petit; Referee: Sylvain Palhies

3 April 2021 31	Grenoble	2–2	Châteauroux	Grenoble
20:00 CET (UTC+1)	Ravet (yellow card) 18'; Djitté 25'; Bénet 31', (yellow card) 51'; Monfray (yellow card) 37' (yellow-red card) 74'; Tapoko (yellow card) 40'	Report	Sunu (red card) 26'; Ibara 36'; Tormin 54'	Stadium: Stade des Alpes; Referee: Amaury Delerue

10 April 2021 32	Châteauroux	1–2	Dunkerque	Châteauroux
20:00 CET (UTC+1)	Sanganté (yellow card) 20'; Grange 24'	Report	Huysman 7'; Tchokounté 50'; Diarra (yellow card) 69'	Stadium: Stade Gaston Petit; Referee: Benjamin Lepaysant

17 April 2021 33	Toulouse	1–0	Châteauroux	Toulouse
20:00 CEST (UTC+2)	Amian 52'; Bayo (yellow card) 56'	Report	Ibara (yellow card) 48'; Canelhas (yellow card) 89'	Stadium: Stadium de Toulouse; Referee: Nicolas Rainville

20 April 2021 34	Châteauroux	1–1	Rodez	Châteauroux
20:00 CET (UTC+1)	Ibara (yellow card) 61'; Bonny 77'; Merdji (yellow card) 90'	Report	Boissier 71'	Stadium: Stade Gaston Petit; Referee: Mathieu Vernice

24 April 2021 35	Clermont	2–1	Châteauroux	Clermont-Ferrand
20:45 CEST (UTC+2)	Berthomier 6', 80'	Report	Grange 72'	Stadium: Stade Gabriel Montpied; Referee: Olivier Thual

1 May 2021 36	Châteauroux	1–2	Troyes	Châteauroux
20:00 CEST (UTC+2)	M'Boné 20', (yellow card) 53'; Mulumba (yellow card) 72' (yellow-red card) 83'; Grange (yellow card) 90+2'	Report	Tardieu 51' (pen.); Touzghar 71'	Stadium: Stade Gaston Petit; Referee: Mehdi Mokhtari

8 May 2021 37	Guingamp	2–0	Chateauroux	Guingamp
20:00 CEST (UTC+2)	Fofana 17'; Pierrot (yellow card) 33', (goal) 53'	Report	Ibara (yellow card) 66'	Stadium: Stade de Roudourou; Referee: Hakim Ben El Hadj

15 May 2021 38	Châteauroux	0–0	Ajaccio	Châteauroux
20:00 CEST (UTC+2)	M'Boné (yellow card) 49'	Report	Courtet (penalty missed) 78', (yellow card) 86'	Stadium: Stade Gaston Petit; Referee: Arnaud Baert

=== Coupe de France ===
19 January 2021 Eighth round	Châteauroux	0–2	Ajaccio	Châteauroux
18:00 CET (UTC+1)	Doucouré (yellow card) 38'; Opa Sanganté (yellow card) 49'	Report	Barreto 18'; Sainati (yellow card) 34'; Courtet 61'	Stadium: Stade Gaston Petit; Attendance: 0 Referee: (France) Mathieu Vernice
Note: Played Behind Closed Doors
