= List of French football transfers summer 2019 =

This is a list of French football transfers for the 2019 summer transfer window. Only transfers featuring Ligue 1 and Ligue 2 are listed.

== Ligue 1 ==
Note: Flags indicate national team as has been defined under FIFA eligibility rules. Players may hold more than one non-FIFA nationality.

=== Paris Saint-Germain ===
In:

No.	Pos.	Nation	Player
21	MF	ESP	Ander Herrera (from (England) Manchester United)
19	MF	ESP	Pablo Sarabia (from (Spain) Sevilla)
30	GK	POL	Marcin Bułka (from (England) Chelsea)
25	DF	NED	Mitchel Bakker (from (Netherlands) Ajax)
22	DF	FRA	Abdou Diallo (from (Germany) Borussia Dortmund)
27	DF	SEN	Idrissa Gueye (from (England) Everton)

Out:

No.	Pos.	Nation	Player
18	MF	ARG	Giovani Lo Celso (to (Spain) Real Betis, previously on loan)
1	GK	ITA	Gianluigi Buffon (to (Italy) Juventus)
25	MF	FRA	Adrien Rabiot (to (Italy) Juventus)
13	DF	BRA	Dani Alves (to (Brazil) Sao Paulo FC)
27	FW	FRA	Moussa Diaby (to (Germany) Bayer Leverkusen)
–	MF	FRA	Gaëtan Robail (to (France) Lens)
21	FW	USA	Timothy Weah (to (France) Lille)
—	MF	POL	Grzegorz Krychowiak (to (Russia) Lokomotiv Moscow)
24	MF	FRA	Christopher Nkunku (to (Germany) RB Leipzig)

=== Lille ===
In:

No.	Pos.	Nation	Player
21	FW	USA	Timothy Weah (from (France) Paris Saint-Germain)
–	DF	MOZ	Reinildo Mandava (from (Portugal) Belenenses)
21	MF	BFA	Abou Ouattara (from (Belgium) KV Mechelen, previously on loan)
–	DF	MAR	Saad Agouzoul (from (Morocco) Kawkab Marrakech)
–	GK	BRA	Léo Jardim (from (Portugal) Rio Ave)
–	GK	ANG	Manuel Cafumana (from (Angola) 1º de Agosto)
–	MF	FRA	Benjamin André (from (France) Rennes)

Out:

No.	Pos.	Nation	Player
—	DF	MLI	Youssouf Koné (to (France) Lyon)
—	MF	BRA	Thiago Mendes (to (France) Lyon)
19	FW	CIV	Nicolas Pépé (to (England) Arsenal)
—	MF	NED	Anwar El Ghazi (to (England) Aston Villa, previously on loan)

=== Lyon ===
In:

No.	Pos.	Nation	Player
—	FW	FRA	Boubacar Fofana (from (France) Gazélec Ajaccio)
—	GK	ROU	Ciprian Tătărușanu (from (France) Nantes)
—	MF	BRA	Jean Lucas (from (Brazil) Flamengo)
—	DF	MLI	Youssouf Koné (from (France) Lille)
—	MF	BRA	Thiago Mendes (from (France) Lille)
—	DF	DEN	Joachim Andersen (from (Italy) Sampdoria)

Out:

No.	Pos.	Nation	Player
—	MF	LUX	Christopher Martins (to (Switzerland) Young Boys)
—	DF	FRA	Ferland Mendy (to (Spain) Real Madrid)
—	MF	FRA	Jordan Ferri (to (France) Montpellier)
—	MF	FRA	Tanguy Ndombele (to (England) Tottenham)
—	MF	FRA	Hamza Rafia (to (Italy) Juventus)
—	DF	MAD	Jérémy Morel (to (France) Rennais)

=== Saint-Étienne ===
In:

No.	Pos.	Nation	Player
—	DF	FRA	Alpha Sissoko (from Clermont)
—	DF	FRA	Harold Moukoudi (from Le Havre)
—	DF	FRA	Lucas Llort (from Montpellier II)

Out:

No.	Pos.	Nation	Player
4	DF	FRA	William Saliba (to (England) Arsenal)

=== Marseille ===
In:

No.	Pos.	Nation	Player

Out:

No.	Pos.	Nation	Player

=== Montpellier ===
In:

No.	Pos.	Nation	Player
—	MF	FRA	Jordan Ferri (from (France) Lyon)

Out:

No.	Pos.	Nation	Player
–	GK	FRA	Benjamin Lecomte (to (France) Monaco)
—	DF	FRA	Lucas Llort (to Montpellier II)
–	FW	BEL	Isaac Mbenza (to (England) Huddersfield Town, previously on loan)

=== Nice ===
In:

No.	Pos.	Nation	Player

Out:

No.	Pos.	Nation	Player

=== Reims ===
In:

No.	Pos.	Nation	Player

Out:

No.	Pos.	Nation	Player
-	DF	BEL	Björn Engels (to (England) Aston Villa)

=== Nîmes ===
In:

No.	Pos.	Nation	Player

Out:

No.	Pos.	Nation	Player

=== Rennes ===
In:

No.	Pos.	Nation	Player
—	DF	MAD	Jérémy Morel (from (France) Lyon)

Out:

No.	Pos.	Nation	Player
15	DF	ALG	Ramy Bensebaini (to (Germany) Borussia Mönchengladbach)
21	MF	FRA	Benjamin André (to (France) Lille)
23	DF	SEN	Ismaïla Sarr (to (England) Watford)
40	GK	CZE	Tomáš Koubek (to (Germany) FC Augsburg)

=== Strasbourg ===
In:

No.	Pos.	Nation	Player
5	DF	CIV	Lamine Koné (from (England) Sunderland, previously on loan)

Out:

No.	Pos.	Nation	Player

=== Nantes ===
In:

No.	Pos.	Nation	Player
13	DF	MLI	Molla Wagué (from (Italy) Udinese)

Out:

No.	Pos.	Nation	Player
—	GK	ROU	Ciprian Tătărușanu (to Lyon)

=== Angers ===
In:

No.	Pos.	Nation	Player

Out:

No.	Pos.	Nation	Player

=== Bordeaux ===
In:

No.	Pos.	Nation	Player

Out:

No.	Pos.	Nation	Player

=== Amiens ===
In:

No.	Pos.	Nation	Player
–	DF	SWE	Emil Krafth (from (Italy) Bologna (previously on loan))

Out:

No.	Pos.	Nation	Player
–	DF	SWE	Emil Krafth (to (England) Newcastle United)

=== Toulouse ===
In:

No.	Pos.	Nation	Player

Out:

No.	Pos.	Nation	Player

=== Monaco ===
In:

No.	Pos.	Nation	Player
–	MF	POR	Gelson Martins (from (Spain) Atlético Madrid, previously on loan)
–	GK	FRA	Benjamin Lecomte (from (France) Montpellier)

Out:

No.	Pos.	Nation	Player
2	DF	FRA	Ronaël Pierre-Gabriel (to (Germany) Mainz 05)
–	MF	FRA	Guévin Tormin (to (France) Châteauroux)
–	GK	ESP	Álvaro Fernández (to (Spain) SD Huesca)
–	MF	BEL	Youri Tielemans (to (England) Leicester City, previously on loan)
–	MF	FRA	Ibrahima Diallo (to (France) Brest, previously on loan)

=== Dijon ===
In:

No.	Pos.	Nation	Player
-	DF	GAB	Bruno Ecuele Manga (from (Wales) Cardiff City)

Out:

No.	Pos.	Nation	Player
22	MF	KOR	Kwon Chang-hoon (to (Germany) SC Freiburg)

=== Metz ===
In:

No.	Pos.	Nation	Player
6	MF	CIV	Victorien Angban (from (England) Chelsea, previously on loan)

Out:

No.	Pos.	Nation	Player

=== Brest ===
In:

No.	Pos.	Nation	Player
–	MF	FRA	Ibrahima Diallo (from (France) Monaco)

Out:

No.	Pos.	Nation	Player

== Ligue 2 ==
=== Caen ===
In:

No.	Pos.	Nation	Player

Out:

No.	Pos.	Nation	Player

=== Guingamp ===
In:

No.	Pos.	Nation	Player

Out:

No.	Pos.	Nation	Player
11	FW	FRA	Marcus Thuram (to (Germany) Borussia Mönchengladbach)

=== Troyes ===
In:

No.	Pos.	Nation	Player

Out:

No.	Pos.	Nation	Player

=== Paris FC ===
In:

No.	Pos.	Nation	Player
3	DF	SRB	Strahinja Tanasijević (from (Italy) Chievo (loan))

Out:

No.	Pos.	Nation	Player

=== Lens ===
In:

No.	Pos.	Nation	Player
–	MF	FRA	Gaëtan Robail (from (France) Paris Saint-Germain)

Out:

No.	Pos.	Nation	Player

=== Lorient ===
In:

No.	Pos.	Nation	Player

Out:

No.	Pos.	Nation	Player

=== Le Havre ===
In:

No.	Pos.	Nation	Player

Out:

No.	Pos.	Nation	Player
4	DF	FRA	Harold Moukoudi (to Saint-Étienne)

=== Orléans ===
In:

No.	Pos.	Nation	Player

Out:

No.	Pos.	Nation	Player

=== Grenoble ===
In:

No.	Pos.	Nation	Player

Out:

No.	Pos.	Nation	Player

=== Clermont ===
In:

No.	Pos.	Nation	Player

Out:

No.	Pos.	Nation	Player
22	DF	FRA	Alpha Sissoko (to Saint-Étienne)
–	FW	FRA	Florian Ayé (to (Italy) Brescia)

=== Châteauroux ===
In:

No.	Pos.	Nation	Player
–	MF	FRA	Guévin Tormin (fromo (France) Monaco)

Out:

No.	Pos.	Nation	Player

=== Niort ===
In:

No.	Pos.	Nation	Player

Out:

No.	Pos.	Nation	Player

=== Valenciennes ===
In:

No.	Pos.	Nation	Player

Out:

No.	Pos.	Nation	Player

=== Nancy ===
In:

No.	Pos.	Nation	Player

Out:

No.	Pos.	Nation	Player

=== Auxerre ===
In:

No.	Pos.	Nation	Player

Out:

No.	Pos.	Nation	Player

=== Sochaux ===
In:

No.	Pos.	Nation	Player

Out:

No.	Pos.	Nation	Player
–	MF	FRA	Lucien Agoumé (to (Italy) Inter Milan)

=== Ajaccio ===
In:

No.	Pos.	Nation	Player

Out:

No.	Pos.	Nation	Player

=== Rodez ===
In:

No.	Pos.	Nation	Player

Out:

No.	Pos.	Nation	Player

=== Chambly ===
In:

No.	Pos.	Nation	Player

Out:

No.	Pos.	Nation	Player

=== Le Mans ===
In:

No.	Pos.	Nation	Player

Out:

No.	Pos.	Nation	Player

== See also ==
- 2019–20 Ligue 1
- 2019–20 Ligue 2
