= Sangante =

Sangante is a surname. Notable people with the surname include:

- Arouna Sangante (born 2002), Senegalese footballer
- Opa Sanganté (born 1991), Senegalese footballer
