= List of Belgian football transfers winter 2021–22 =

This is a list of Belgian football transfers for the 2022 winter transfer window. Only transfers involving a team from the professional divisions are listed, including the 18 teams in the Belgian First Division A and the 8 teams playing in the Belgian First Division B.

The wintertransfer window opened on 1 January 2022 and towards the end of January 2022.

Note that several transfers were announced prior to the opening date. Furthermore, players without a club may join one at any time, either during or in between transfer windows. After the transfer window closes a few completed transfers might still be announced a few days later.

== Transfers ==
Date	Name	Moving from	Moving to	Fee	Note
3 December 2021	(Democratic Republic of the Congo) Jonathan Bolingi	R Antwerp FC	(Thailand) Buriram United	Undisclosed	
25 December 2021	(France) William Rémy	Free Agent	RE Virton	Free	
25 December 2021	(France) Prosper Mendy	Free Agent	RE Virton	Free	
1 January 2022	(United States) Kyle Duncan	(United States) New York Red Bulls	KV Oostende	Free	
1 January 2022	Hugo Siquet	Standard Liège	(Germany) SC Freiburg	€5.000.000	
1 January 2022	(Lithuania) Nauris Petkevičius	(Lithuania) FC Hegelmann Litauen	RSC Charleroi	Free	
1 January 2022	(Jamaica) Shamar Nicholson	RSC Charleroi	(Russia) FC Spartak Moscow	€10.000.000	
1 January 2022	(Ivory Coast) Vakoun Bayo	KAA Gent	RSC Charleroi	Loan	
1 January 2022	(Senegal) Bingourou Kamara	(France) RC Strasbourg Alsace	RSC Charleroi	Loan	
1 January 2022	(Japan) Tsuyoshi Watanabe	(Japan) FC Tokyo	KV Kortrijk	Undisclosed	
1 January 2022	(United States) Mauricio Cuevas	(United States) LA Galaxy	Club Brugge	Free	
1 January 2022	Joeri Dequevy	RWDM47	KVC Westerlo	Free	
1 January 2022	Joeri Dequevy	KVC Westerlo	KFC Houtvenne	Loan	
1 January 2022	Zakaria Atteri	Royal Excel Mouscron	Royal Knokke F.C.	Loan	
1 January 2022	Flor Van Den Eynden	Free Agent	KV Mechelen	Free	
1 January 2022	(Finland) Marius Könkkölä	KRC Genk	(Finland) AC Oulu	Free	
3 January 2022	(Japan) Yuma Suzuki	Sint-Truidense V.V.	(Japan) Kashima Antlers	Undisclosed	
3 January 2022	Seppe Maesen	Lierse Kempenzonen	K.F.C. Dessel Sport	Loan	
4 January 2022	(Japan) Koki Machida	(Japan) Kashima Antlers	Royale Union Saint-Gilloise	Loan	
4 January 2022	Dante Rigo	(Netherlands) PSV Eindhoven	K Beerschot VA	Undisclosed	
4 January 2022	Yannis Mbombo	(France) Lyon La Duchère	RE Virton	Undisclosed	
4 January 2022	(Thailand) Kawin Thamsatchanan	OH Leuven	(Thailand) Port F.C.	Loan	
4 January 2022	Alessandro Albanese	Waasland-Beveren	KV Oostende	Undisclosed	
4 January 2022	Gert Van Walle	K.M.S.K. Deinze	Royal Knokke F.C.	Free	
4 January 2022	Dion Cools	(Denmark) FC Midtjylland	SV Zulte Waregem	Loan	
4 January 2022	(France) Aboubakar Sidibé	(France) Clermont Foot	RE Virton	Undisclosed	
5 January 2022	(Japan) Tatsuhiro Sakamoto	(Japan) Cerezo Osaka	KV Oostende	Loan	
5 January 2022	(Poland) Kacper Kozłowski	(England) Brighton & Hove Albion	Royale Union Saint-Gilloise	Loan	
5 January 2022	(Uruguay) Felipe Avenatti	Standard Liège	K Beerschot VA	Loan	
5 January 2022	Timothy Derijck	KV Kortrijk	SV Zulte Waregem	Undisclosed	
7 January 2022	(Ivory Coast) Aziz Ouattara Mohammed	(Sweden) Hammarby Fotboll	KRC Genk	Undisclosed	
7 January 2022	(Senegal) Aliou Baldé	(Netherlands) Feyenoord	Waasland-Beveren	Loan	
7 January 2022	(Democratic Republic of the Congo) Edo Kayembe	KAS Eupen	(England) Watford	Undisclosed	
9 January 2022	(Trinidad and Tobago) Sheldon Bateau	KV Mechelen	(Turkey) Samsunspor	Free	
9 January 2022	Matthias Verreth	Waasland-Beveren	(Netherlands) FC Eindhoven	Undisclosed	
10 January 2022	(Japan) Shinji Kagawa	(Greece) PAOK FC	Sint-Truidense V.V.	Free	
11 January 2022	(France) Mathieu Cafaro	(France) Stade de Reims	Standard Liège	Undisclosed	
11 January 2022	Joachim Van Damme	KV Mechelen	Standard Liège	Undisclosed	
11 January 2022	(Brazil) Cauê Vinicius dos Santos	(Brazil) Grêmio Novorizontino	Lommel S.K.	Undisclosed	
11 January 2022	(Algeria) Mehdi Terki	RWDM47	(Luxembourg) FC Swift Hesperange	Free	
12 January 2022	(Luxembourg) Yan Bouché	Royal Excel Mouscron	(Denmark) Jammerbugt FC	Free	
12 January 2022	(Ghana) Daniel Opare	Free Agent	R.F.C. Seraing (1922)	Free	
12 January 2022	(Mali) Molla Wagué	(France) FC Nantes	R.F.C. Seraing (1922)	Free	
12 January 2022	Gilles Dewaele	KV Kortrijk	Standard Liège	Undisclosed	
12 January 2022	Dries Wouters	(Germany) FC Schalke 04	KV Mechelen	Loan	
12 January 2022	(France) Nicolas Gavory	Standard Liège	(Germany) Fortuna Düsseldorf	Undisclosed	
12 January 2022	Guillaume Gillet	RSC Charleroi	Waasland-Beveren	Free	
13 January 2022	Renaud Emond	(France) FC Nantes	Standard Liège	Undisclosed	
13 January 2022	(Turkey) Talha Ulvan	OH Leuven	(Turkey) Samsunspor	Undisclosed	
13 January 2022	(Senegal) Mamadou Bolivar Seck	KAA Gent	K.R.C. Gent	Loan	
14 January 2022	(Senegal) Mamadou Fall	RSC Charleroi	(Turkey) Kasımpaşa S.K.	Undisclosed	
14 January 2022	(United States) Jacob Montes	(England) Crystal Palace	RWDM47	Loan	
14 January 2022	(France) Maïdine Douane	(France) FC Metz	R.F.C. Seraing (1922)	Loan	
14 January 2022	Arne Cassaert	Cercle Brugge	Royal Knokke F.C.	Loan	
16 January 2022	(Morocco) Abdel Al Badaoui	(Spain) AD Alcorcón	Waasland-Beveren	Undisclosed	
17 January 2022	(Bosnia and Herzegovina) Numan Kurdić	(Bosnia and Herzegovina) FK Sarajevo	RWDM47	Undisclosed	
17 January 2022	(Ivory Coast) Kouadio-Yves Dabila	(France) Lille OSC	R.F.C. Seraing (1922)	Loan	
17 January 2022	Staf De Graeve	KV Mechelen	KFC Sint-Lenaarts	Free	
18 January 2022	(Germany) Torben Müsel	(Germany) Borussia Mönchengladbach	KAS Eupen	Loan	
18 January 2022	(Kazakhstan) Yan Vorogovsky	(Kazakhstan) FC Kairat	RWDM47	Loan	
18 January 2022	(Canada) Liam Fraser	(Canada) Toronto FC	K.M.S.K. Deinze	Free	
18 January 2022	Igor De Camargo	KV Mechelen	RWDM47	Undisclosed	
18 January 2022	Alexandre De Bruyn	KAA Gent	KV Kortrijk	Undisclosed	
18 January 2022	(Morocco) Manuel da Costa	Free Agent	Waasland-Beveren	Free	
19 January 2022	Arno Verschueren	Lommel S.K.	(Netherlands) Sparta Rotterdam	Undisclosed	
19 January 2022	(Brazil) Lucas Ribeiro Costa	RSC Charleroi	Waasland-Beveren	Loan	
19 January 2022	(France) Teddy Alloh	(France) Paris Saint-Germain F.C.	KAS Eupen	Loan	
19 January 2022	(Greece) Giannis Konstantelias	(Greece) PAOK FC	KAS Eupen	Loan	
19 January 2022	(Angola) Jonathan Buatu	Sint-Truidense V.V.	(Turkey) Eyüpspor	Loan	
20 January 2022	(Bosnia and Herzegovina) Nihad Mujakić	KV Kortrijk	(Bosnia and Herzegovina) FK Sarajevo	Undisclosed	
20 January 2022	Jérémy Landu	Standard Liège	(Germany) VfB Stuttgart II	Undisclosed	
20 January 2022	(Faroe Islands) Samuel Johansen Chukwudi	(Faroe Islands) Havnar Bóltfelag	Royale Union Saint-Gilloise	Undisclosed	
21 January 2022	(Japan) Tatsuya Ito	Sint-Truidense V.V.	(Germany) 1. FC Magdeburg	Loan	
21 January 2022	Nayel Mehssatou	RSC Anderlecht	KV Kortrijk	Undisclosed	
22 January 2022	(Spain) Cameron Puertas	(Switzerland) FC Lausanne-Sport	Royale Union Saint-Gilloise	Undisclosed	
23 January 2022	(United States) Bryan Reynolds	(Italy) AS Roma	KV Kortrijk	Loan	
23 January 2022	Laurens Symons	KV Mechelen	K.S.C. Lokeren-Temse	Undisclosed	
24 January 2022	(Italy) Alessandro Russo	(Italy) U.S. Sassuolo Calcio	Sint-Truidense V.V.	Loan	
24 January 2022	(Ivory Coast) Chris Bedia	RSC Charleroi	(Switzerland) Servette FC	Undisclosed	
24 January 2022	(Slovenia) Enrik Ostrc	(France) ES Troyes AC	Lommel S.K.	Loan	
25 January 2022	(Republic of the Congo) Silvère Ganvoula	(Germany) VfL Bochum	Cercle Brugge	Loan	
26 January 2022	(Kenya) Eric Johana Omondi	(Sweden) Jönköpings Södra IF	Waasland-Beveren	Free	
26 January 2022	(France) Valentin Vanbaleghem	(Italy) A.C. Perugia Calcio	RE Virton	Undisclosed	
26 January 2022	Tibo Persyn	Club Brugge KV	K.V.C. Westerlo	Loan	
26 January 2022	(Cape Verde) Alexis Gonçalves	RWDM47	Francs Borains	Loan	
27 January 2022	Maxime Electeur	(Luxembourg) FC Swift Hesperange	RE Virton	Undisclosed	
27 January 2022	(Switzerland) Bastien Toma	KRC Genk	(Switzerland) FC St. Gallen	Loan	
27 January 2022	Lucas Defise	Royale Union Saint-Gilloise	(Netherlands) Helmond Sport	Loan	
27 January 2022	Robbe Quirynen	Royal Antwerp F.C.	K.M.S.K. Deinze	Undisclosed	
27 January 2022	Daan Heymans	(Italy) Venezia F.C.	RSC Charleroi	Loan	
27 January 2022	(Georgia (country)) Giorgi Chakvetadze	KAA Gent	(Germany) Hamburger SV	Loan	
28 January 2022	Senne Brugmans	Sint-Truidense V.V.	K.V.V. Thes Sport Tessenderlo	Undisclosed	
28 January 2022	(Albania) Din Sula	RE Virton	K. Patro Eisden Maasmechelen	Loan	
28 January 2022	Geoffrey Mujangi Bia	Free Agent	RE Virton	Free	
28 January 2022	(Democratic Republic of the Congo) Jordan Botaka	KAA Gent	(Netherlands) Fortuna Sittard	Loan	
28 January 2022	(Germany) Jordan Torunarigha	(Germany) Hertha BSC	KAA Gent	Loan	
28 January 2022	(Spain) Álex Millán	(Spain) Villarreal CF	Royale Union Saint-Gilloise	Loan	
28 January 2022	(Denmark) Andreas Skov Olsen	(Italy) Bologna F.C. 1909	Club Brugge KV	€ 7.000.000	
28 January 2022	(Ecuador) Willian Pacho	(Ecuador) Independiente del Valle	Royal Antwerp F.C.	Undisclosed	
29 January 2022	(Cameroon) Collins Fai	Standard Liège	(Saudi Arabia) Al-Tai FC	Undisclosed	
29 January 2022	(United States) Joseph Efford	Waasland-Beveren	(Scotland) Motherwell F.C.	Undisclosed	
29 January 2022	(Democratic Republic of the Congo) Hervé Kage	(Romania) FC Botoșani	RE Virton	Free	
30 January 2022	(Sweden) Benjamin Nygren	KRC Genk	(Denmark) FC Nordsjælland	Undisclosed	
30 January 2022	(France) Sofiane Augarreau	(France) Olympique Lyonnais	RE Virton	Loan	
31 January 2022	(France) Jordan Faucher	Waasland-Beveren	RE Virton	Loan	
31 January 2022	(Australia) James Jeggo	(Greece) Aris Thessaloniki F.C.	KAS Eupen	Undisclosed	
31 January 2022	Ameen Al-Dakhil	Standard Liège	Sint-Truidense V.V.	Undisclosed	
31 January 2022	(Brazil) Klauss (footballer)	(Germany) TSG 1899 Hoffenheim	Sint-Truidense V.V.	loan	
31 January 2022	(Netherlands) Rick van Drongelen	(Germany) 1. FC Union Berlin	KV Mechelen	loan	
31 January 2022	(France) Adrien Trebel	RSC Anderlecht	(Switzerland) FC Lausanne-Sport	Loan	
31 January 2022	Mohamed Guindo	RSC Anderlecht	(Italy) F.C. Pro Vercelli 1892	Undisclosed	
31 January 2022	(Netherlands) Osaze Urhoghide	(Scotland) Celtic F.C.	KV Oostende	loan	
31 January 2022	(Senegal) Pathé Mboup	(Senegal) AS Dakar Sacré-Cœur	Standard Liège	Undisclosed	
31 January 2022	Álex Craninx	(Norway) Molde FK	R.F.C. Seraing (1922)	Loan	
31 January 2022	(Senegal) Youssouph Badji	Club Brugge KV	RSC Charleroi	Loan	
31 January 2022	(New Zealand) Liberato Cacace	Sint-Truidense V.V.	(Italy) Empoli F.C.	Loan	
31 January 2022	Ignace Van der Brempt	Club Brugge KV	(Austria) FC Red Bull Salzburg	€ 5.000.000	
31 January 2022	Kylian Hazard	Cercle Brugge	RWDM47	Loan	
31 January 2022	(France) Serge-Philippe Raux-Yao	Cercle Brugge	(France) Rodez AF	Undisclosed	
31 January 2022	(Armenia) Sargis Adamyan	(Germany) TSG 1899 Hoffenheim	Club Brugge KV	Loan	
31 January 2022	(Netherlands) Emanuel Emegha	(Netherlands) Sparta Rotterdam	Royal Antwerp F.C.	Undisclosed	
31 January 2022	(Netherlands) Bryan Smeets	(Netherlands) Sparta Rotterdam	Lommel S.K.	Undisclosed	
31 January 2022	(Ivory Coast) Benjamin Karamoko	(Norway) Sarpsborg 08 FF	RSC Charleroi	Free	
31 January 2022	(Togo) David Henen	(France) Grenoble Foot 38	KV Kortrijk	Undisclosed	
31 January 2022	(France) Élie Youan	(Switzerland) FC St. Gallen	KV Mechelen	Loan	
31 January 2022	(Netherlands) Kjell Scherpen	(England) Brighton & Hove Albion F.C.	KV Oostende	Loan	
31 January 2022	Denis Odoi	(England) Fulham F.C.	Club Brugge KV	Undisclosed	
31 January 2022	(Netherlands) Carel Eiting	KRC Genk	(England) Huddersfield Town A.F.C.	Free	
31 January 2022	(Ghana) Kamal Sowah	Club Brugge KV	(Netherlands) AZ Alkmaar	Loan	
31 January 2022	(England) Marcel Lewis	Royale Union Saint-Gilloise	(England) Accrington Stanley F.C.	Loan	
31 January 2022	(Canada) Iké Ugbo	KRC Genk	(France) ES Troyes AC	Loan	
31 January 2022	Allan Delferrière	Standard Liège	(Scotland) Hibernian F.C.	Undisclosed	
31 January 2022	Levi Malungu	RSC Charleroi	(Netherlands) MVV Maastricht	Loan	
31 January 2022	Obbi Oulare	(England) Barnsley F.C.	RWDM47	Loan	
31 January 2022	(Nigeria) Eric Ocansey	KV Kortrijk	Waasland-Beveren	Loan	
31 January 2022	Amine Benchaib	RSC Charleroi	KV Kortrijk	Undisclosed	
31 January 2022	Wolf Ackx	Cercle Brugge	Royal Knokke F.C.	Loan	
31 January 2022	(Senegal) Issa Soumaré	K Beerschot VA	(France) US Quevilly-Rouen Métropole	Loan	
31 January 2022	Dries Corstjens	Sint-Truidense V.V.	(Germany) FSV Union Fürstenwalde	Free	
31 January 2022	(France) Théo Pierrot	R.F.C. Seraing (1922)	Lommel S.K.	Undisclosed	
31 January 2022	Mathias Fixelles	KV Kortrijk	KVC Westerlo	Undisclosed	
31 January 2022	Alexander Maes	Lierse Kempenzonen	RC Hades	Free	
31 January 2022	Fostave Mabani	Standard Liège	(Netherlands) MVV Maastricht	Loan	
31 January 2022	(France) Scotty Sadzoute	OH Leuven	(France) Nîmes Olympique	Loan	
31 January 2022	Alexandre Stanic	KV Mechelen	(Italy) Pisa S.C.	Loan	
7 February 2022	(Ukraine) Oleksandr Filippov	Sint-Truiden	(Latvia) Riga	Loan	
