= Tyrone Tormin =

French footballer (born 2001)

Personal information
- Date of birth: 29 June 2001 (age 25)
- Place of birth: Clichy, France
- Height: 1.77 m (5 ft 10 in)
- Position: Winger

Team information
- Current team: RE Virton
- Number: 12

Youth career
- 2007–2016: Red Star
- 2016–2017: Saint-Étienne

Senior career*
Years	Team	Apps	(Gls)
2018–2021	Saint-Étienne B	23	(7)
2020–2021	Saint-Étienne	3	(0)
2021–2024	Niort B	25	(7)
2021–2024	Niort	33	(7)
2024–2025	Châteauroux	28	(6)
2025	Vukovar 1991	3	(0)
2026–	RE Virton	9	(1)

International career
2017	France U16	3	(0)
2017–2018	France U17	9	(1)
2018–2019	France U18	5	(0)
2020	France U19	1	(0)
- * Club domestic league appearances and goals as of 28 June 2026

Tyrone Tormin (born 29 June 2001) is a French professional footballer who plays as a winger for RE Virton.

== Club career ==
On 6 April 2019, Tormin signed his first professional contract with Saint-Étienne. He made his professional debut with Saint-Étienne in a 3-0 Ligue 1 loss to on 26 September 2020.

On 31 August 2021, Tormin signed a three-year contract with Niort. On 10 August 2024, he signed for Châteauroux.

== Personal life ==
Tormin is the brother of the footballer Guévin Tormin.

== Career statistics ==
As of matches played 1 February 2022.

Appearances and goals by club, season and competition
Club	Season	League			Coupe de France		Total	
Club	Season	Division	Apps	Goals	Apps	Goals	Apps	Goals
Saint-Étienne	2020–21	Ligue 1	3	0	0	0	3	0
Chamois Niortais	2021–22	Ligue 2	2	0	— (Note: Niort excluded from the 2021–22 Coupe de France)		2	0
Career total			5	0	0	0	5	0
