= Christopher Opéri =

Ivorian footballer (born 1997)

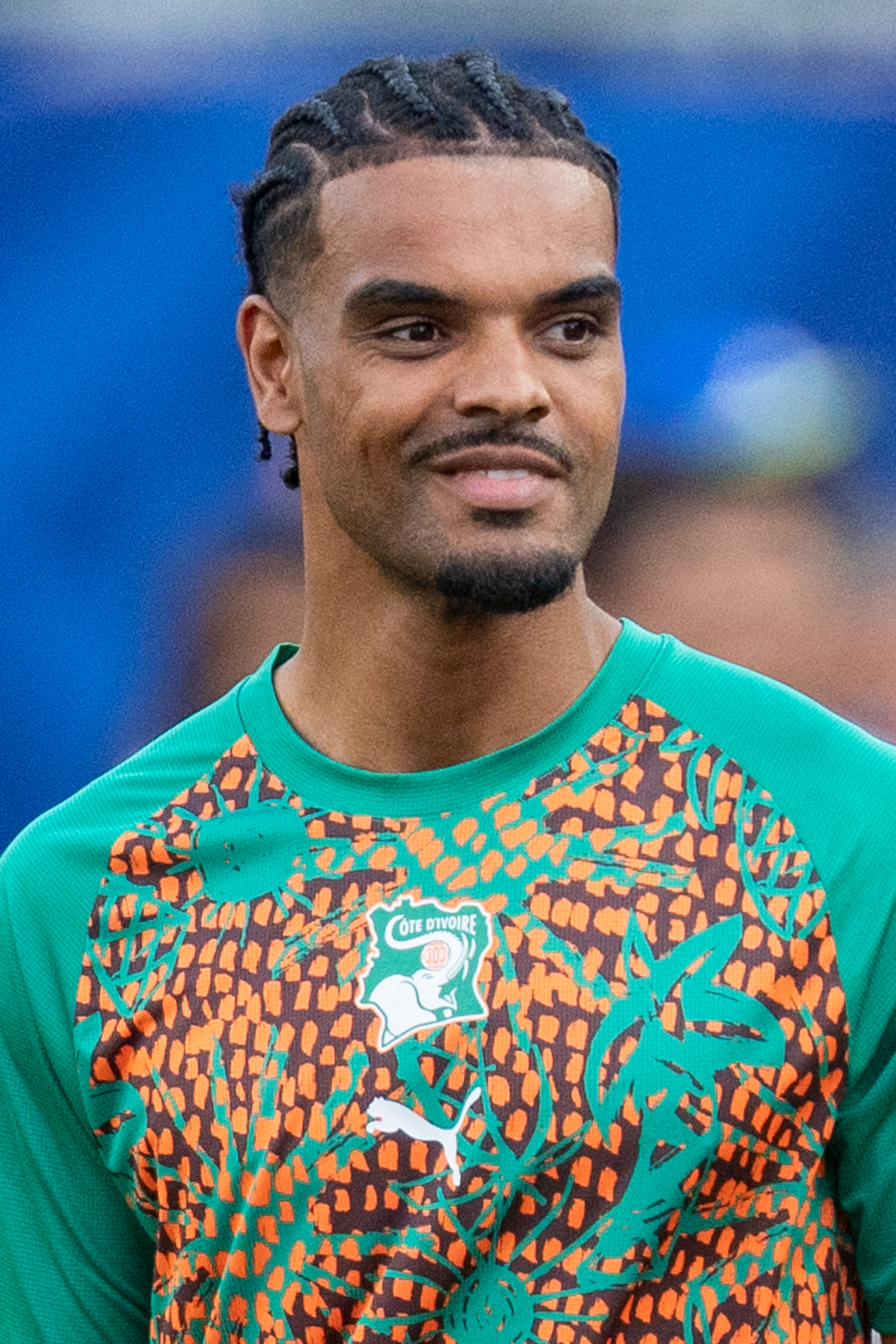
- Opéri with the Ivory Coast in 2026

Personal information
- Full name: Christopher Téa Opéri
- Date of birth: 29 April 1997 (age 29)
- Place of birth: Abidjan, Ivory Coast
- Height: 1.82 m (6 ft 0 in)
- Position: Left-back

Team information
- Current team: İstanbul Başakşehir
- Number: 21

Youth career
- 2012–2017: Caen

Senior career*
Years	Team	Apps	(Gls)
2014–2017	Caen II	38	(4)
2017–2021	Châteauroux II	10	(0)
2017–2021	Châteauroux	73	(3)
2021–2022	Gent	10	(0)
2022–2025	Le Havre	76	(5)
2025–	İstanbul Başakşehir	34	(2)

International career^{‡}
2024–	Ivory Coast	13	(0)
- * Club domestic league appearances and goals as of 16 August 2026 ‡ National team caps and goals as of 25 June 2026

Christopher Téa Opéri (born 29 April 1997) is an Ivorian professional footballer who plays as a left-back for Süper Lig club İstanbul Başakşehir and the Ivory Coast national team.

== Club career ==
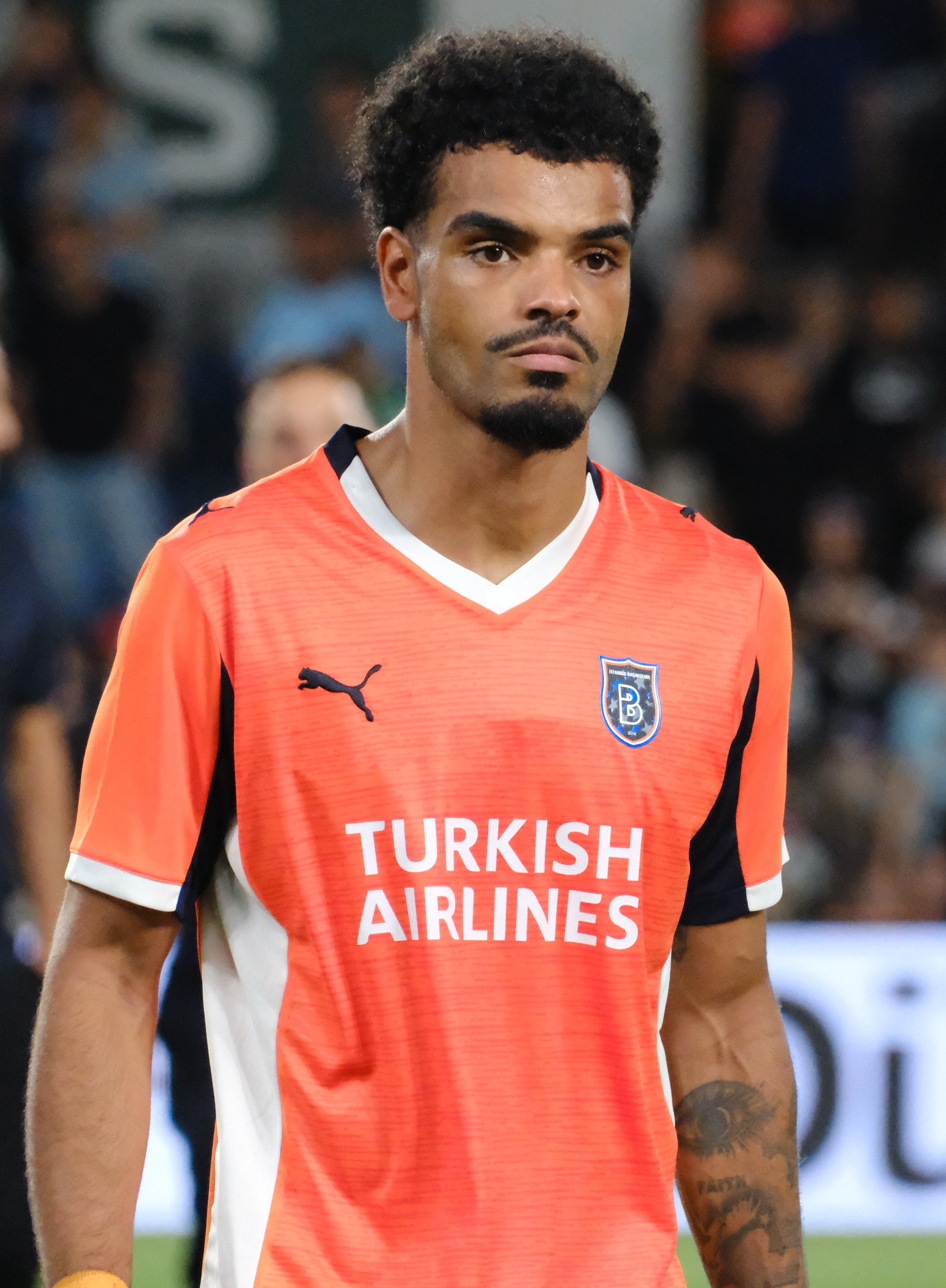
Opéri with İstanbul Başakşehir in 2025

After years in the youth academy of Caen, Opéri was transferred to Châteauroux on 24 July 2017. He made his first professional appearance with Châteauroux in a 2–1 Ligue 2 loss to Gazélec Ajaccio on 22 September 2017.

On 2 June 2021, he signed a two-year contract with Gent in Belgium. On 21 June 2022, Opéri's contract with Gent was terminated by mutual consent.

On 29 June 2022, Opéri returned to France and signed a two-year contract with Le Havre.

On 7 January 2025, Süper Lig club İstanbul Başakşehir signed Opéri for 3.5 years.

== International career ==
Opéri made his debut for the Ivory Coast national team on 7 June 2024 in a World Cup qualifier against Gabon at the Amadou Gon Coulibaly Stadium. He substituted Ghislain Konan in the 86th minute of a 1–0 Ivory Coast victory.

Opéri was included in the list of Ivorian players selected by coach Emerse Faé to participate in the 2025 Africa Cup of Nations.

On 15 May 2026, Opéri was integrated by Ivory Coast coach Emerse Faé in his list of 26 players in order to participate in the 2026 World Cup.

== Personal life ==
Opéri was born in the Ivory Coast to an Ivorian father and French mother, and moved to France at a young age. His uncle Cyril Domoraud is a former professional footballer.

== Career statistics ==
=== Club ===
As of match played 21 December 2024

Appearances and goals by club, season and competition
Club	Season	League			National cup (Note: Includes Coupe de France, Belgian Cup)		League cup (Note: Includes Coupe de la Ligue)		Europe		Other		Total	
Club	Season	Division	Apps	Goals	Apps	Goals	Apps	Goals	Apps	Goals	Apps	Goals	Apps	Goals
Caen	2016–17	Ligue 1	0	0	0	0	1	0	—		—		1	0
Châteauroux	2017–18	Ligue 2	2	0	1	0	0	0	—		—		3	0
Châteauroux	2018–19	Ligue 2	22	0	2	0	1	0	—		—		25	0
Châteauroux	2019–20	Ligue 2	23	2	1	0	0	0	—		—		24	2
Châteauroux	2020–21	Ligue 2	26	1	1	0	—		—		—		27	1
Châteauroux	Total		73	3	5	0	1	0	0	0	0	0	79	3
Châteauroux B	2019–20	Championnat National 3	1	0	—		—		—		—		1	0
Gent	2021–22	Belgian Pro League	9	0	1	0	—		6 (Note: Appearances in UEFA Europa Conference League)	0	1 (Note: Appearance Begian Pro League European play-off)	0	17	0
Le Havre	2022–23	Ligue 2	35	2	0	0	—		—		—		35	2
Le Havre	2023–24	Ligue 1	28	3	1	0	—		—		—		29	3
Le Havre	2024–25	Ligue 1	13	0	1	0	—		—		—		14	0
Le Havre	Total		76	5	2	0	0	0	0	0	0	0	78	5
Career total			159	8	8	0	2	0	6	0	1	0	176	8

=== International ===
As of match played 25 June 2026

Appearances and goals by national team and year
National team	Year	Apps	Goals
Ivory Coast	2024	7	0
Ivory Coast	2025	4	0
Ivory Coast	2026	2	0
Total		13	0
