= Razak Boukari =

Togolese footballer (born 1987)

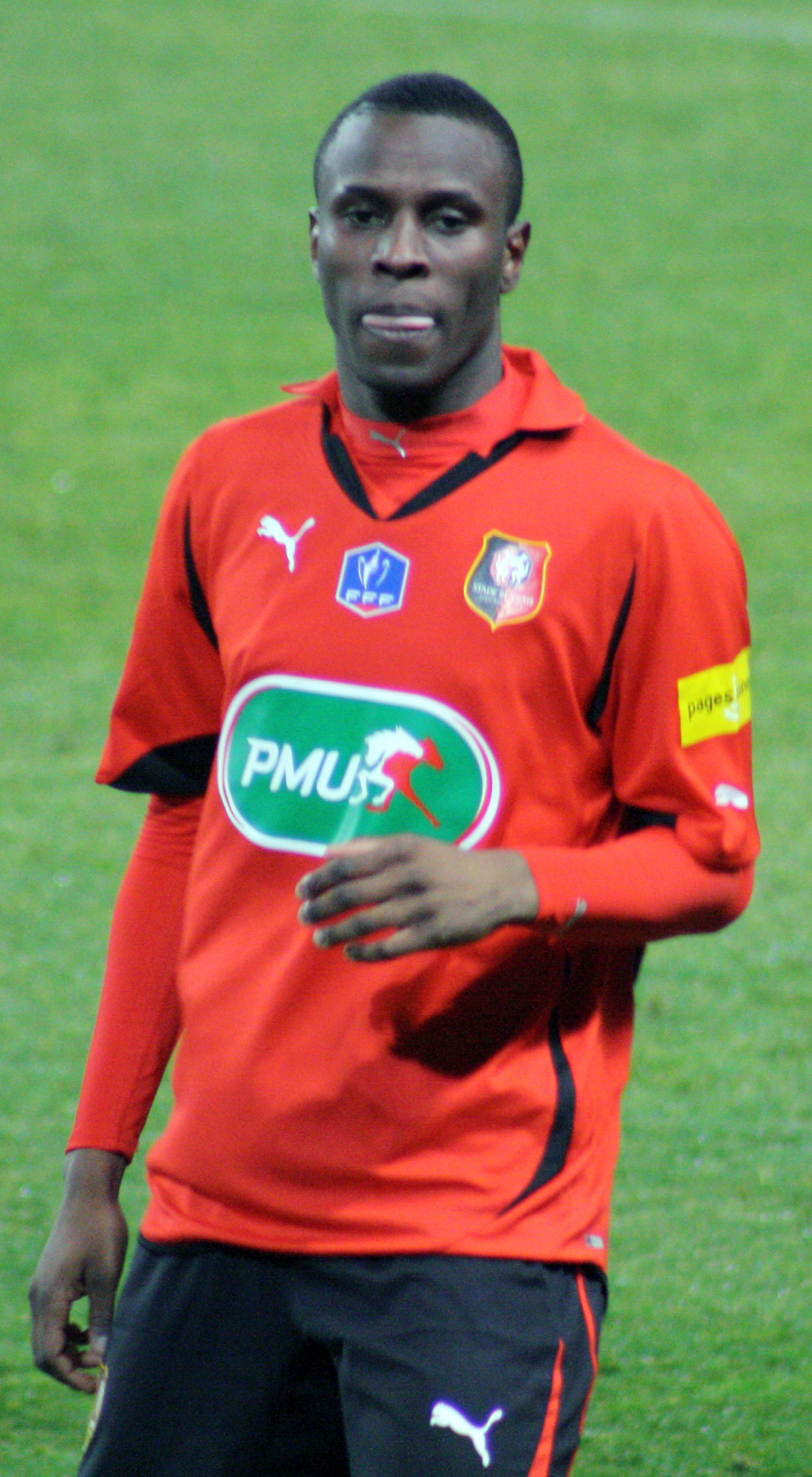
- Boukari with Rennes in January 2011

Personal information
- Full name: Abdoul-Razak Boukari
- Date of birth: 25 April 1987 (age 39)
- Place of birth: Lomé, Togo
- Height: 1.87 m (6 ft 2 in)
- Position: Winger

Youth career
- 2002–2004: Châteauroux

Senior career*
Years	Team	Apps	(Gls)
2004–2006	Châteauroux	48	(7)
2006–2010	Lens	119	(11)
2010–2012	Rennes	37	(7)
2012–2016	Wolverhampton Wanderers	18	(0)
2013	→ Sochaux B (loan)	1	(0)
2013–2014	→ Sochaux (loan)	10	(0)
2016–2021	Châteauroux	80	(12)
2021–2022	Châteauroux B	8	(0)
2022	Châteauroux	1	(0)

International career^{‡}
2006	France U21	1	(0)
2010–2018	Togo	19	(1)
- * Club domestic league appearances and goals as of 15 May 2021 ‡ National team caps and goals as of 23:16, 6 March 2020 (UTC)

Abdoul-Razak "Razak" Boukari (born 25 April 1987) is a Togolese professional footballer who plays as a winger.

He progressed from Châteauroux to play top-level football in France for both Lens and Rennes, before joining Wolverhampton Wanderers in 2012. In 2016, he returned to Châteauroux, playing for the club until 2022.

== Club career ==
=== Early days ===
Boukari began his career with Châteauroux, for whom his father Sadou also played. He made his professional debut during the 2004–05 season in Ligue 2, ending the campaign with two goals from his fourteen appearances. In the following season he became regular player and caught the eye of several top division clubs, such as Nantes, Lille and Monaco.

=== Ligue 1 moves ===
In June 2006 he signed a five-year contract with Lens of Ligue 1. He played 29 league games for Lens in his first year and 19 in his second season but could not prevent the club from being relegated. Promised more playing time, Boukari remained after relegation to be part of the team that won promotion back to the top flight as Ligue 2 champions in 2009–10.

In January 2011 he left Lens to sign for fellow Ligue 1 club Rennes for €4.5 million in a four-and-a-half-year deal. He scored four goals for his new club in 18 games, most of them as a starter, before injury kept him out for the remainder of the season.

However, he lost his starting position during the following campaign to Jonathan Pitroipa. This situation was compounded by suffering from a torn left thigh injury in January 2012, which kept Boukari on the sidelines for four weeks. He did though manage 20 appearances for the club, 13 of them as a substitute and scored three goals as Rennes finished in 6th place.

=== Wolverhampton Wanderers ===
Boukari moved to Wolverhampton Wanderers of the Football League Championship on 27 August 2012, signing a four-year deal for an undisclosed fee. Only weeks before, Boukari had spent time on trial at newly promoted Premier League side West Ham United, but they instead opted to buy Wolverhampton Wanderers winger Matt Jarvis, opening up a position at Wolverhampton Wanderers for Boukari to eventually fill.

After a promising start to the season, Boukari was substituted during a 1–0 win over Sheffield Wednesday on 29 September 2012, after suffering a calf injury. It was subsequently reported that he would be out of action for three to six weeks, but it was later reported he wouldn't be fit until Autumn 2013.

On 12 August 2013, Ligue 1 side Sochaux announced that Boukari was to spend a week on trial with them, with a view to a season-long loan deal. Although it was reported after this initial week that the player could not agree terms, on 27 August, a loan deal to cover the 2013–14 season was completed. His time with Sochaux was again impaired by injury problems, making only ten appearances (all as substitute), as the team suffered relegation.

== International career ==
Boukari, who holds dual citizenship with Togo and France, made his France U21 debut against Sweden on 14 November 2006. In July 2010, he confirmed with the Togolese Football Federation to represent Togo thereafter. From 2010 to 2018, Boukari played for the Togo national team.

== Career statistics ==
=== Club ===
As of match played 6 May 2022

Appearances and goals by club, season and competition
Club	Season	League			Cup (Note: Includes Coupe de France, Coupe de la Ligue, FA Cup, and EFL Cup)		Other		Total	
Club	Season	Division	Apps	Goals	Apps	Goals	Apps	Goals	Apps	Goals
Châteauroux	2004–05	Ligue 2	14	5	1	1	—		15	6
Châteauroux	2005–06	Ligue 2	34	2	4	0	—		38	2
Châteauroux	Total		48	7	5	1	—		53	8
Lens	2006–07	Ligue 1	29	0	5	0	8	1	42	1
Lens	2007–08	Ligue 1	19	0	2	1	3	0	24	1
Lens	2008–09	Ligue 2	26	4	5	1	—		31	5
Lens	2009–10	Ligue 1	27	4	4	1	—		31	5
Lens	2010–11	Ligue 1	18	3	1	0	—		23	3
Lens	Total		119	11	17	3	11	1	147	15
Rennes	2010–11	Ligue 1	18	4	3	1	—		21	5
Rennes	2011–12	Ligue 1	20	3	2	1	8 (Note: Appearances in the UEFA Europa League)	2	33	7
Rennes	Total		38	7	5	2	8	2	54	11
Wolverhampton Wanderers	2012–13	Championship	4	0	2	0	—		6	0
Sochaux (loan)	2013–14	Ligue 1	10	0	0	0	—		10	0
Sochaux B (loan)	2013–14	CFA	1	0	—		—		1	0
Châteauroux	2016–17	National	22	6	4	1	—		26	7
Châteauroux	2017–18	Ligue 2	23	1	2	0	—		25	1
Châteauroux	2018–19	Ligue 2	17	4	2	0	—		19	4
Châteauroux	2019–20	Ligue 2	1	0	0	0	—		1	0
Châteauroux	2020–21	Ligue 2	17	1	0	0	—		17	1
Châteauroux	Total		80	12	8	1	—		88	13
Châteauroux B	2021–22	National 3	8	0	—		—		8	0
Châteauroux	2021–22	National	1	0	0	0	—		1	0
Career total			309	37	37	7	19	3	365	47

=== International goals ===
Scores and results list Togo's goal tally first, score column indicates score after each Boukari goal.

List of international goals scored by Razak Boukari
No.	Date	Venue	Opponent	Score	Result	Competition
1	29 February 2012	Nyayo National Stadium, Nairobi, Kenya	Kenya	1–1	1–2	2013 Africa Cup of Nations qualification

== Honours ==
Lens

- Ligue 2: 2008–09
- Coupe de la Ligue runner-up: 2008

Châteauroux

- Championnat National: 2016–17

France U21

- Toulon Tournament: 2007
