= Scotty Sadzoute =

Malagasy footballer (born 1998)

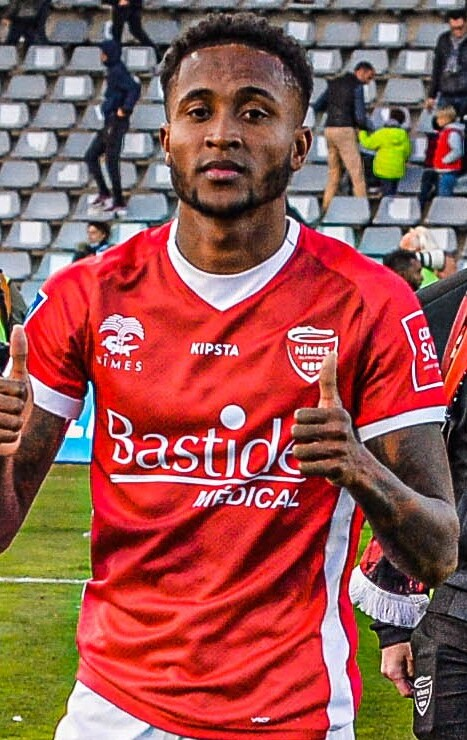
- Sadzoute in 2022

Personal information
- Date of birth: 29 April 1998 (age 28)
- Place of birth: Le Port, Réunion
- Height: 1.72 m (5 ft 8 in)
- Position: Left back

Team information
- Current team: Sedan

Youth career
- 2014–2017: Lille

Senior career*
Years	Team	Apps	(Gls)
2017–2021	Lille II	48	(7)
2019	→ Pau FC II (loan)	1	(0)
2019–2021	→ Pau FC (loan)	50	(0)
2021–2024	OH Leuven	0	(0)
2022–2023	→ Nîmes (loan)	27	(0)
2022	→ Nîmes II (loan)	1	(0)
2023–2024	OH Leuven U23	13	(1)
2025	Šiauliai	27	(0)
2026	Koper	1	(0)
2026–	Sedan	0	(0)

International career^{‡}
2025–	Madagascar	1	(0)
- * Club domestic league appearances and goals as of 19 August 2026 ‡ National team caps and goals as of 17:19, 10 June 2025 (UTC)

Scotty Sadzoute (born 29 April 1998) is a professional footballer playing as a left back for Sedan. Born in France, he plays for the Madagascar national team.

== Career ==
In 2013, Sadzoute left his local town in Réunion to start a footballing career in mainland France. In 2014, he joined the youth academy of Lille OSC, and in 2018 signed his first professional contract with them. He joined Pau FC on loan for the 2019–20 season, and helped them get promoted into the Ligue 2. He extended his loan with Pau into the 2020–21 season. Sadzoute made his professional debut with Pau in a 3–0 Ligue 2 loss to Valenciennes on 22 August 2020.

In 2021, Sadzoute signed for Oud-Heverlee Leuven until 2024, but did not play for the club in the first six months and only featured as an unused substitute in one match. On the last day of the winter 2021–22 transfer window, Sadzoute was loaned to Nîmes until the end of the 2022–23 season, with option to buy. After suffering a serious injury in the beginning of 2023, Sadzoute returned to OH Leuven in the summer of 2023 and continued working on his recovery. On 17 December 2023, he appeared again in the starting lineup of the U23-team of OH Leuven, playing at the third level of Belgian football. He would make 13 appearances for the U23-team (including one goal) throughout the remainder of the 2023–24 season, but was released when his contract ended, without ever appearing for the A-squad.

On 24 February 2025 Sadzoute signed with Lithianian club FA Šiauliai. On 2 March 2025 he made his debut in A Lyga against FK Panevėžys. FA Šiauliai won 3-1.

== Personal life ==
Sadzoute is of Réunionnais and Malagasy descent, and is open to playing for both the France and Madagascar national football teams. He debuted with Madagascar in a friendly 3–1 loss to DR Congo on 8 June 2025.
