= Opa Sanganté =

Footballer (born 1991)

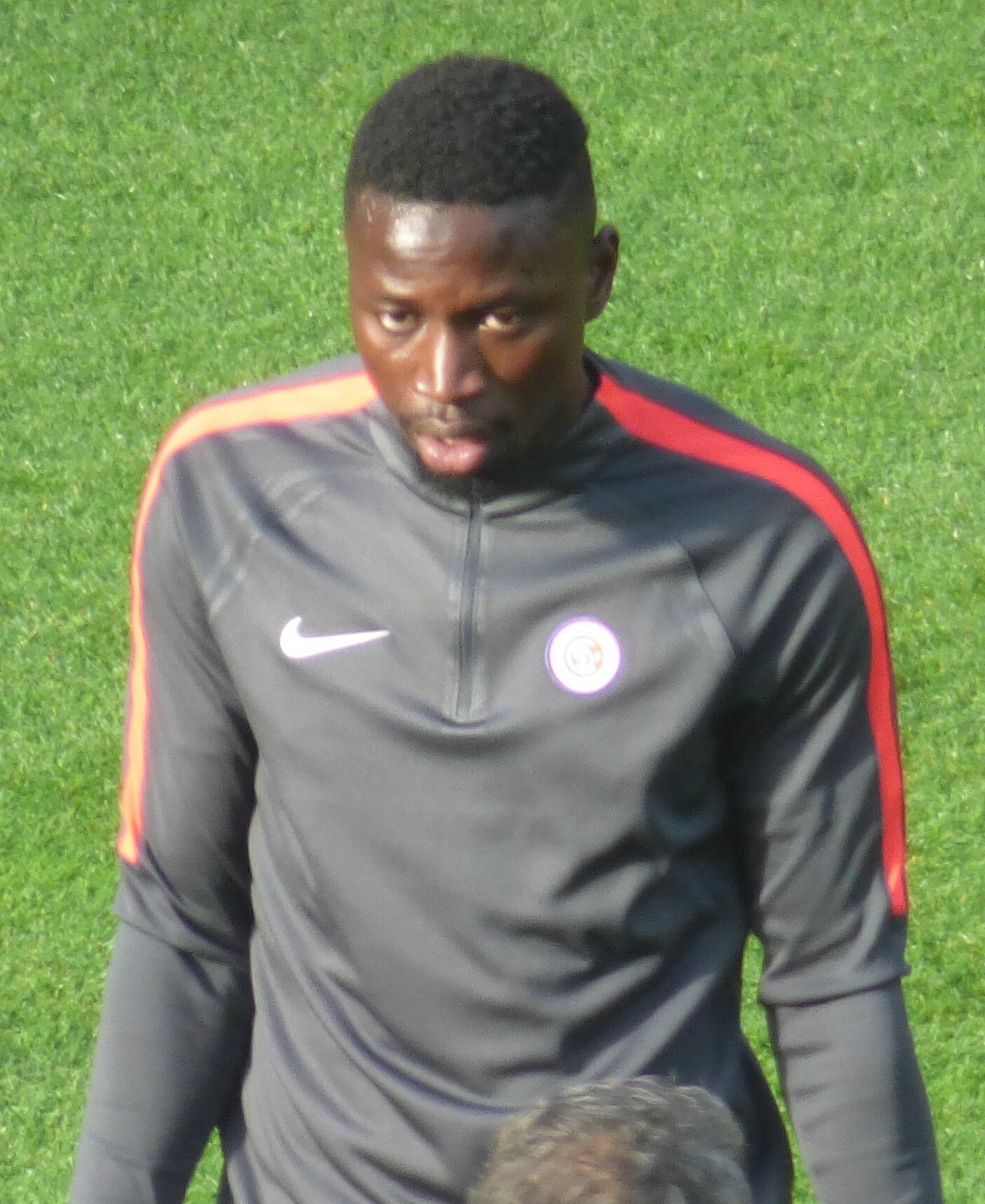
- Sanganté with Châteauroux in 2018

Personal information
- Date of birth: 1 February 1991 (age 35)
- Place of birth: Diannah Malary, Senegal
- Height: 1.88 m (6 ft 2 in)
- Position: Midfielder

Team information
- Current team: Dunkerque
- Number: 26

Senior career*
Years	Team	Apps	(Gls)
2012–2013	Beauvais II	17	(1)
2012–2015	Beauvais	55	(1)
2015–2016	Chambly	27	(1)
2016–2023	Châteauroux	192	(6)
2023–	Dunkerque	91	(4)

International career^{‡}
2020–	Guinea-Bissau	39	(0)
- * Club domestic league appearances and goals as of 11 May 2026 ‡ National team caps and goals as of 29 September 2026

Opa Sanganté (born 1 February 1991) is a professional footballer who plays as a midfielder for French Ligue 2 club Dunkerque. Born in Senegal, he plays for the Guinea-Bissau national team.

== Club career ==
Sanganté moved to France from Senegal at the age of 6, and played football since he was a child. He made his professional debut for Châteauroux in a 3–2 Ligue 2 win over Brest on 28 July 2017.

On 12 July 2023, Sanganté signed with Dunkerque.

== International career ==
Born in Senegal to Senegalese parents, Sanganté is of Bissau-Guinean descent through one of his grandfathers. He holds Senegalese, Bissau-Guinean and French nationalities. He was called up to represent the Guinea-Bissau in October 2020. He debuted for Guinea-Bissau in a 2–0 2021 Africa Cup of Nations qualification loss to Senegal on 13 November 2020.

== Career statistics ==
=== Club ===
As of 27 May 2025

Appearances and goals by club, season and competition
Club	Season	League			National cup (Note: Includes Coupe de France)		Other		Total	
Club	Season	Division	Apps	Goals	Apps	Goals	Apps	Goals	Apps	Goals
Beauvais II	2012–13	CFA 2	17	1	—		—		17	1
Beauvais	2012–13	CFA	9	0	0	0	—		9	0
Beauvais	2013–14	CFA	24	1	2	0	—		26	1
Beauvais	2014–15	CFA	22	0	2	0	—		24	0
Beauvais	Total		55	1	4	0	—		59	1
Chambly	2015–16	National	27	1	3	0	—		30	1
Châteauroux	2016–17	National	33	2	1	0	2 (Note: Appearance(s) in the Coupe de la Ligue)	0	36	2
Châteauroux	2017–18	Ligue 2	27	0	4	0	1	0	32	0
Châteauroux	2018–19	Ligue 2	35	2	2	1	2	0	39	3
Châteauroux	2019–20	Ligue 2	24	0	0	0	1	0	25	0
Châteauroux	2020–21	Ligue 2	29	0	1	0	—		30	0
Châteauroux	2021–22	National	24	0	0	0	—		24	0
Châteauroux	2022–23	National	20	2	1	0	—		21	2
Châteauroux	Total		192	6	9	1	6	0	207	7
Dunkerque	2023–24	Ligue 2	34	2	0	0	—		34	2
Dunkerque	2024–25	Ligue 2	33	2	5	2	2 (Note: Appearances in the Ligue 2 promotion play-offs)	0	40	4
Dunkerque	Total		67	4	5	2	2	0	74	6
Career total			358	13	21	3	8	0	387	16

=== International ===
As of match played 29 September 2026

Appearances and goals by national team and year
National team	Year	Apps	Goals
Guinea-Bissau	2020	2	0
Guinea-Bissau	2021	6	0
Guinea-Bissau	2022	6	0
Guinea-Bissau	2023	7	0
Guinea-Bissau	2024	13	0
Guinea-Bissau	2025	1	0
Guinea-Bissau	2026	4	0
Total		39	0
