= Leandro Morante =

French footballer (born 1997)

Personal information
- Date of birth: 18 April 1997 (age 29)
- Place of birth: Montpellier, France
- Height: 1.94 m (6 ft 4 in)
- Position: Defender

Team information
- Current team: Cannes
- Number: 24

Senior career*
Years	Team	Apps	(Gls)
2019–2020	Béziers	10	(1)
2019–2020	Béziers II	1	(0)
2020–2022	Châteauroux	14	(0)
2021–2022	Châteauroux II	15	(3)
2022–2023	FBBP01	26	(1)
2023–2025	Martigues	55	(1)
2025–2026	Caen	19	(0)
2026–	Cannes	0	(0)
- * Club domestic league appearances and goals as of 23 June 2026

Leandro Morante (born 18 April 1997) is a French professional footballer who plays as a defender for Ligue 3 club Cannes.

== Career ==
Morante signed with Béziers after almost enrolling in an American university. He transferred to Châteauroux, and made his professional debut with them in a 1–1 Ligue 2 tie with Le Havre AC on 17 October 2020.

On 19 July 2022, Morante signed with FBBP01.

== Personal life ==
Morante was born in Montpellier, France to a Spanish father and Senegalese mother.
