= Yannick M'Boné =

Cameroonian footballer (born 1993)

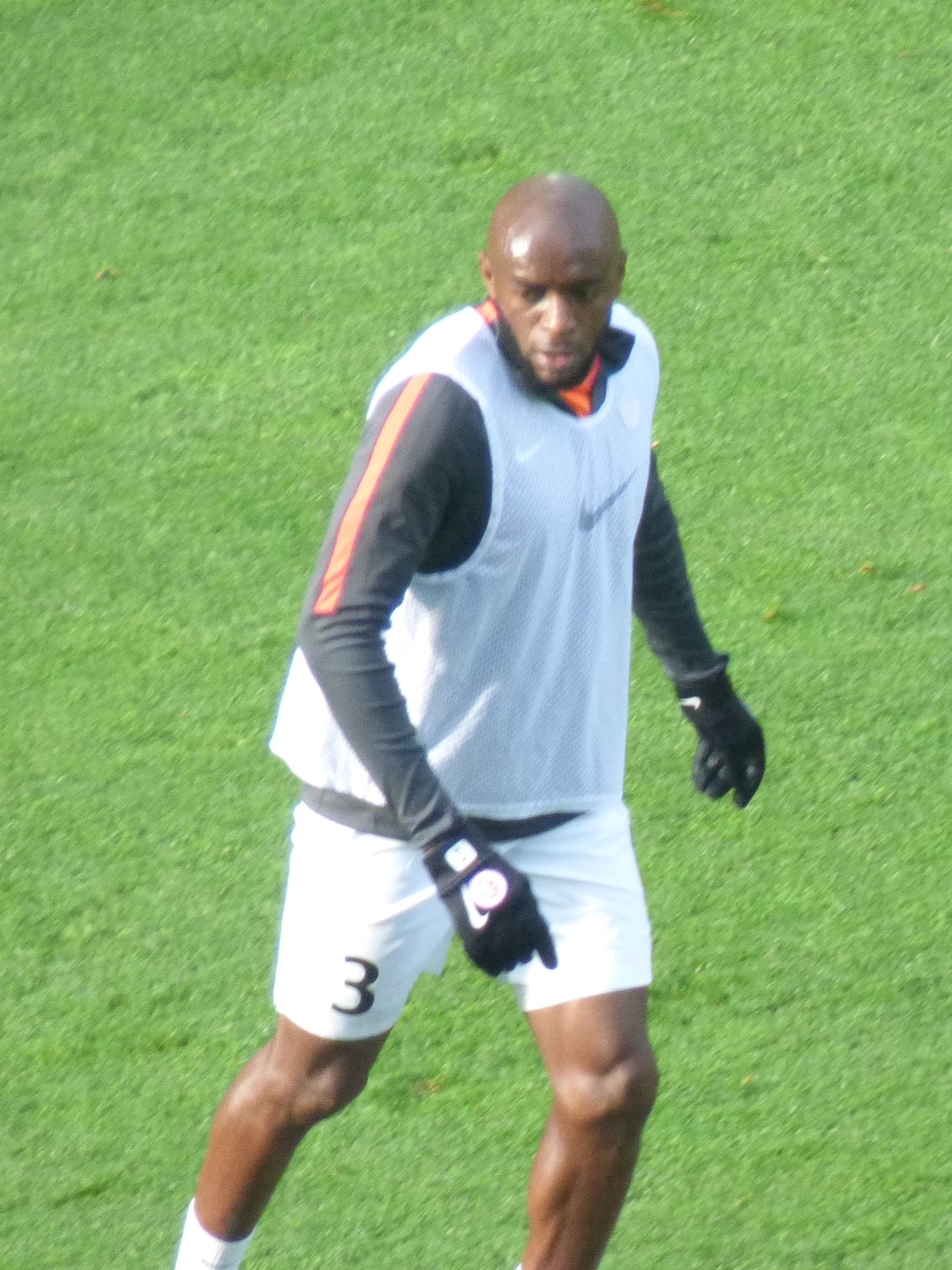
- M'Boné with LB Châteauroux in 2018

Personal information
- Full name: Joseph Yannick M'Boné
- Date of birth: 16 April 1993 (age 33)
- Place of birth: Yaoundé, Cameroon
- Height: 1.85 m (6 ft 1 in)
- Position: Centre-back

Youth career
- 2000–2008: APEJ Mfou
- 2009–2011: Caen

Senior career*
Years	Team	Apps	(Gls)
2011–2015	Caen	11	(0)
2014	→ Fréjus Saint-Raphaël (loan)	12	(0)
2014–2015	→ Fréjus Saint-Raphaël (loan)	30	(0)
2015–2022	Châteauroux	229	(10)
2022–2023	Dunkerque	34	(2)
2023–2024	Chonburi	19	(0)
2024–2026	Versailles	12	(0)
- * Club domestic league appearances and goals as of 23 January 2026

Joseph Yannick M'Boné (born 16 April 1993) is a Cameroonian professional footballer who plays as a centre-back.

== Career ==
M'Boné made his professional debut on 31 August 2011 in a 3–2 Coupe de la Ligue victory over Brest. The following month, he made his league debut in a 1–0 defeat of Toulouse.

On 7 July 2022, M'Boné signed with Dunkerque.

== Career statistics ==
As of 1 August 2020.

Appearances and goals by club, season and competition
Club	Season	League			Cup		League Cup		Total	
Club	Season	Division	Apps	Goals	Apps	Goals	Apps	Goals	Apps	Goals
Caen	2011–12	Ligue 1	7	0	0	0	2	0	9	0
Caen	2012–13	Ligue 2	4	0	2	0	1	0	7	0
Caen	Total		11	0	2	0	3	0	16	0
Fréjus Saint-Raphaël (loan)	2013–14	National	12	0	0	0	0	0	12	0
Fréjus Saint-Raphaël (loan)	2014–15	National	30	0	3	0	0	0	33	0
Fréjus Saint-Raphaël (loan)	Total		42	0	3	0	0	0	45	0
Châteauroux	2015–16	National	34	1	0	0	1	0	35	1
Châteauroux	2016–17	National	33	2	3	0	3	1	39	3
Châteauroux	2017–18	Ligue 2	35	1	3	0	1	0	39	1
Châteauroux	2018–19	Ligue 2	35	0	3	1	2	0	40	1
Châteauroux	2019–20	Ligue 2	27	2	1	0	1	0	29	2
Châteauroux	Total		164	6	10	1	8	1	182	8
Career total			217	6	15	1	11	1	241	8
