= Amir Nouri =

French footballer (born 1994)

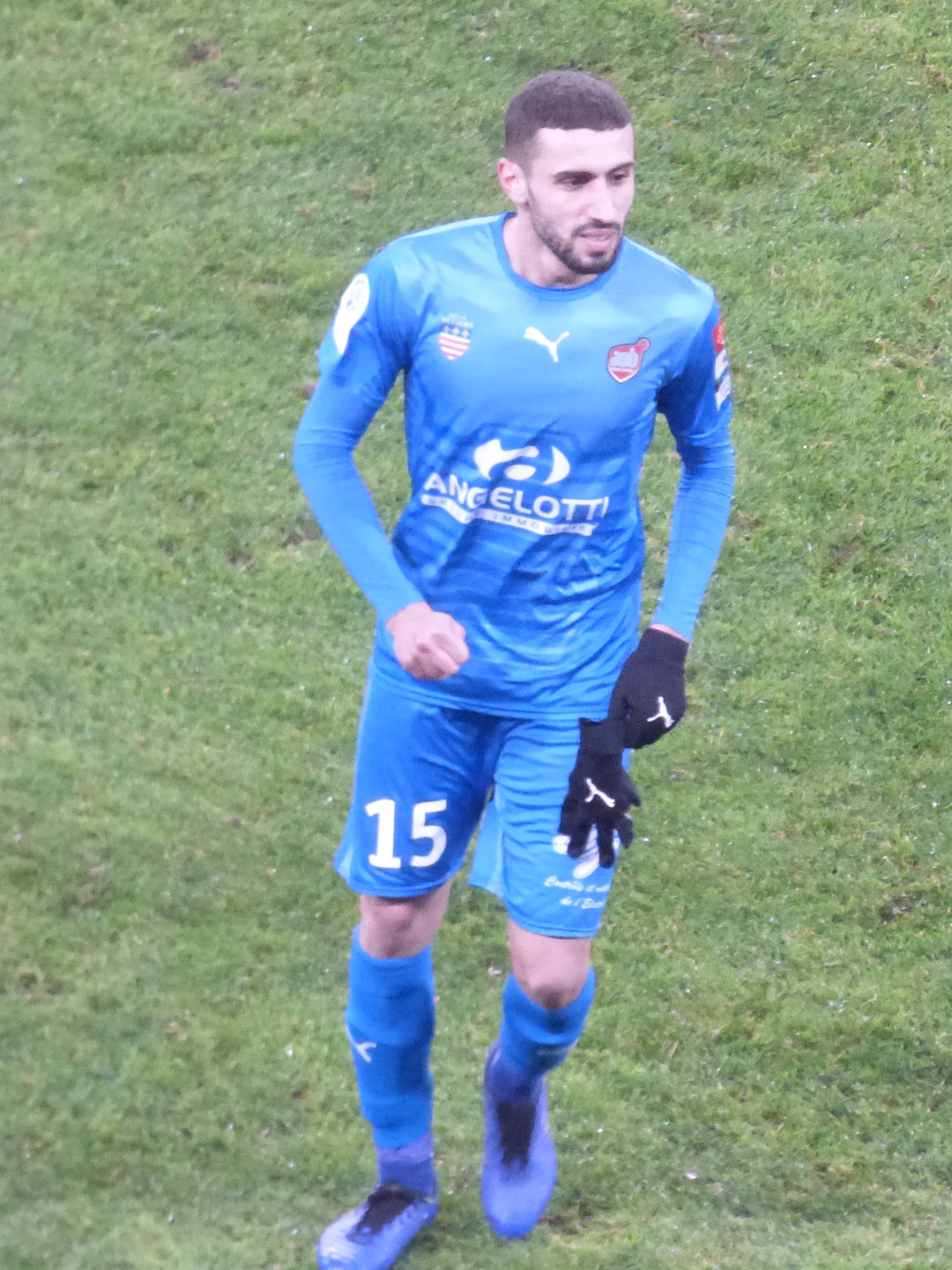
- Nouri in 2019

Personal information
- Date of birth: 10 July 1994 (age 32)
- Place of birth: Lyon, France
- Height: 1.78 m (5 ft 10 in)
- Position: Midfielder

Team information
- Current team: SC Toulon

Senior career*
Years	Team	Apps	(Gls)
2013–2015	Évian II	30	(1)
2015–2016	FBBP	0	(0)
2016–2017	Montceau	30	(0)
2017	Martigues	6	(4)
2017–2019	Béziers	45	(3)
2019–2020	Roeselare	23	(6)
2020–2022	Châteauroux	29	(2)
2021–2022	Châteauroux II	2	(1)
2022–2023	Stade Briochin	22	(2)
2023–2025	ES Sétif	30	(1)
2025–	SC Toulon		
- * Club domestic league appearances and goals as of 14 June 202

Amir Nouri (born 10 July 1994) is a French professional footballer who plays as a midfielder for SC Toulon.

== Career ==
A youth product of Évian, Nouri began his career with Montceau and Martigues in the amateur leagues of France. He made his professional debut in a 2–0 Ligue 2 win over AS Nancy.

== Personal life ==
Nouri was born in Lyon to a family of Algerian descent. He is an educational assistant at the Collège Roger Vailland.
