= Ibrahim Cissé (footballer, born 1999) =

Ivorian association football player

Personal information
- Date of birth: 11 January 1999 (age 27)
- Place of birth: Koun-Fao, Ivory Coast
- Height: 1.90 m (6 ft 3 in)
- Position: Centre-back

Team information
- Current team: AIK
- Number: 25

Youth career
- RC Abidjan
- 2018–2019: Nice

Senior career*
Years	Team	Apps	(Gls)
2019–2020	Nice	2	(0)
2019–2022	→ Nice B	10	(0)
2020	→ Famalicão (loan)	1	(0)
2020	→ Châteauroux (loan)	17	(0)
2021–2022	→ Le Mans (loan)	27	(0)
2022–2023	Nancy	8	(0)
2022–2023	→ Nancy B	2	(0)
2023–2025	KuPS	75	(2)
2026–	AIK	8	(1)

International career
	Ivory Coast U17	3	(0)
	Ivory Coast U20	2	(0)
- * Club domestic league appearances and goals as of 17 May 2026

Ibrahim Cissé (born 11 January 1999) is an Ivorian professional footballer who plays as a centre-back for Allsvenskan club AIK.

== Career ==
On 2 July 2018, joined the academy of OGC Nice. He made his professional debut with Nice in a 2–1 Ligue 1 win over Nîmes on 17 August 2019. After an unsuccessful loan spell at Portuguese club F.C. Famalicão, Cissé joined Ligue 2 club LB Châteauroux on loan on 3 July 2020 for the 2020–21 season. On 18 June 2021, he moved on a new loan to Championnat National club Le Mans.

On 17 March 2023, Cissé signed a two-year contract with KuPS in Finland, with a club option for a third year. At the end of the 2024 season, he helped KuPS to win the Finnish Championship title and the 2024 Finnish Cup title, completing club's first-ever double. He was also named in the Veikkausliiga Team of the Year. On 26 October, his option for the 2025 was exercised. On 16 February 2025, Cissé scored his first official goal in his professional career, in a 3–1 away win against SJK Seinäjoki in Finnish League Cup.

Cissé joined the Swedish Allsvenskan club AIK on 20 January 2026.

== Career statistics ==
As of 17 May 2026

Appearances and goals by club, season and competition
Club	Season	League			National cup (Note: Includes Coupe de France, Suomen Cup, Svenska Cupen)		League cup (Note: Includes Finnish League Cup)		Europe		Total	
Club	Season	Division	Apps	Goals	Apps	Goals	Apps	Goals	Apps	Goals	Apps	Goals
Nice B	2018–19	National 2	6	0	—		—		—		6	0
Nice B	2019–20	National 3	4	0	—		—		—		4	0
Nice B	Total		10	0	0	0	0	0	0	0	10	0
Nice	2019–20	Ligue 1	2	0	0	0	—		—		2	0
Famalicão (loan)	2019–20	Primeira Liga	1	0	0	0	—		—		1	0
Châteauroux (loan)	2020–21	Ligue 2	17	0	0	0	—		—		17	0
Le Mans (loan)	2021–22	National	27	0	1	0	—		—		28	0
Nancy	2022–23	National	8	0	1	0	—		—		9	0
Nancy B	2022–23	National 3	2	0	—		—		—		2	0
KuPS	2023	Veikkausliiga	25	0	3	0	0	0	1 (Note: Includes UEFA Europa Conference League)	0	29	0
KuPS	2024	Veikkausliiga	24	0	4	0	5	0	3	0	36	0
KuPS	2025	Veikkausliiga	26	2	3	0	4	1	13 (Note: Four appearances in UEFA Champions League, three appearances in UEFA Europa League, six appearances and one goal in UEFA Conference League)	1	46	4
KuPS	Total		75	2	10	0	9	1	17	1	111	4
AIK	2026	Allsvenskan	9	1	2	0	–		–		10	1
Career total			150	3	14	0	9	1	17	1	188	5

== Honours ==
KuPS

- Veikkausliiga: 2024, 2025
- Veikkausliiga runner-up: 2023
- Finnish Cup: 2024
- Finnish League Cup runner-up: 2024

Individual

- Veikkausliiga Team of the Year: 2024
