= Baptiste Canelhas =

French footballer (born 2000)

Personal information
- Full name: Baptiste Canelhas Reiffers
- Date of birth: 9 May 2000 (age 26)
- Place of birth: Chabris, France
- Height: 1.73 m (5 ft 8 in)
- Position: Midfielder

Team information
- Current team: Romorantin
- Number: 34

Youth career
- 2007–2011: Selles-sur-Cher
- 2011–2016: Romorantin
- 2016–2020: Châteauroux

Senior career*
Years	Team	Apps	(Gls)
2017–2022	Châteauroux II	14	(0)
2021–2023	Châteauroux	17	(0)
2022	→ Créteil (loan)	12	(1)
2022	→ Créteil II (loan)	2	(0)
2023–	Romorantin	4	(0)
- * Club domestic league appearances and goals as of 2 December 2023

Baptiste Canelhas Reiffers (born 9 May 2000) is a French professional footballer who plays as a midfielder for Championnat National 3 club Romorantin.

== Career ==
Canelhas signed his first professional contract with Châteauroux on 12 June 2020. He made his professional debut with Châteauroux in a 3–3 Ligue 2 tie against Valenciennes on 23 January 2021.

On 4 January 2022, he joined Créteil on loan until the end of the season.
