= Stade Gaston-Petit =

Multi-use stadium in Châteauroux, France

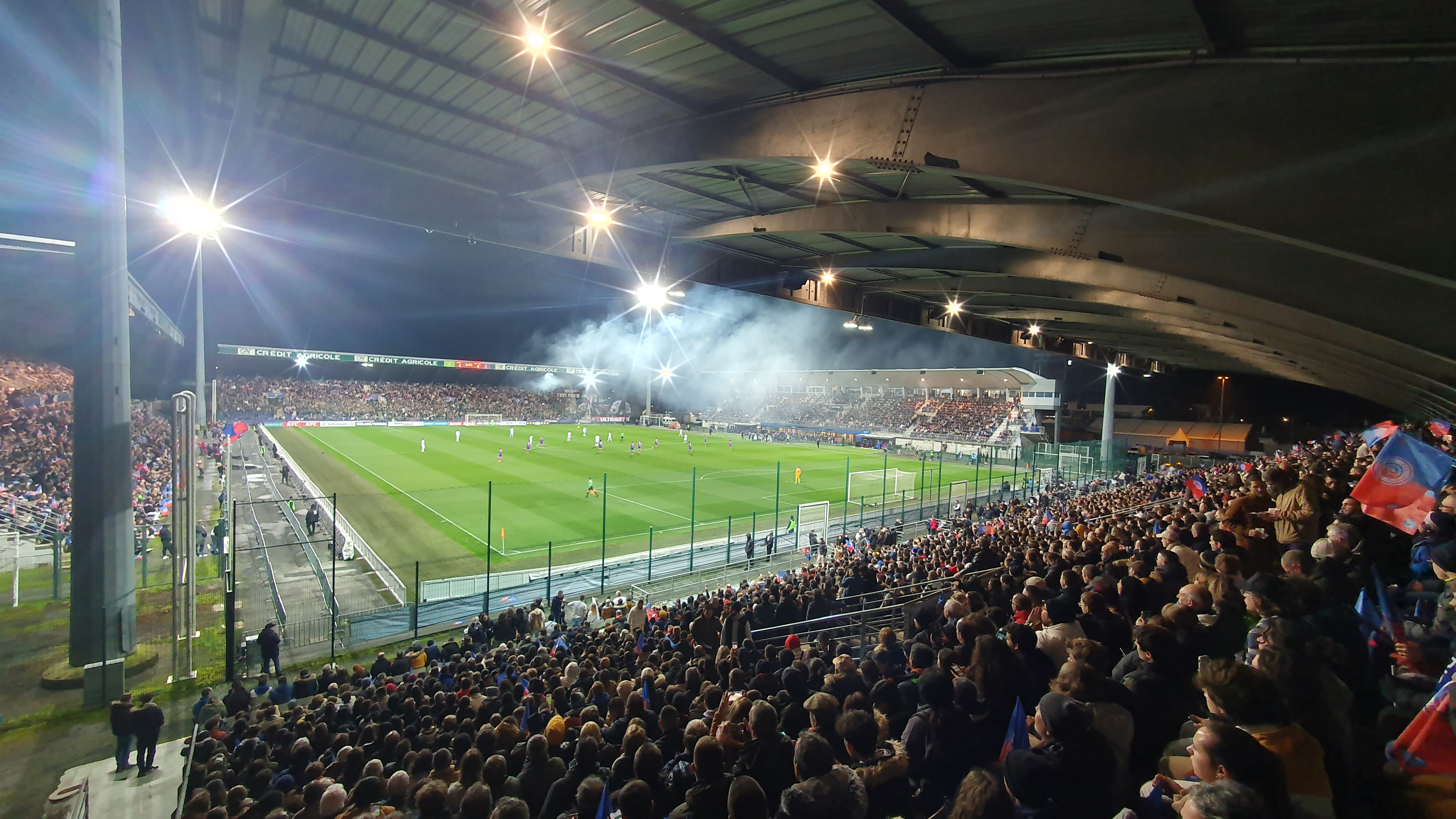
- Interactive map of Stade Gaston-Petit
- Coordinates: 46°48′7″N 1°43′18″E
- Capacity: 17,173
- Surface: AirFibr (hybrid grass)
- Field size: 100 m x 70 m

Construction
- Groundbreaking: 1959
- Opened: September 13, 1964

Tenant
- La Berrichonne de Châteauroux

Stade Gaston-Petit (French pronunciation: [stad gastɔ̃ pəti]) is a multi-use stadium in Châteauroux, France. It is currently used mostly for football matches and is the home stadium of La Berrichonne de Châteauroux. The stadium is able to hold 17,173 people.

Gaston Petit is a former mayor of Châteauroux.

== See also ==
- List of football stadiums in France
- Lists of stadiums
