= Marcin Bułka =

Polish footballer (born 1999)

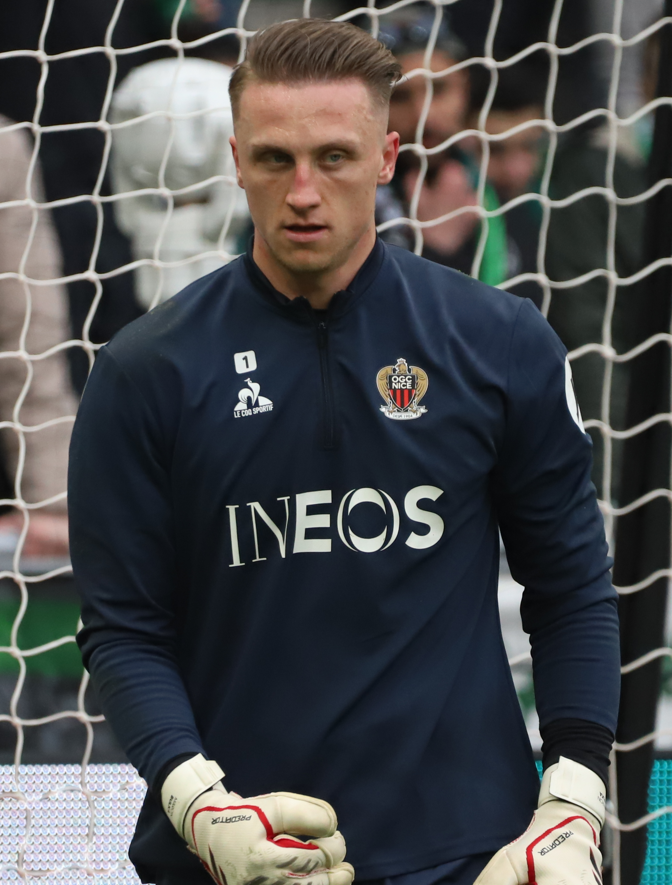
- Bułka with Nice in 2025

Personal information
- Full name: Marcin Bulka
- Date of birth: 4 October 1999 (age 27)
- Place of birth: Płock, Poland
- Height: 1.99 m (6 ft 6 in)
- Position: Goalkeeper

Team information
- Current team: Neom
- Number: 1

Youth career
- 2011–2012: Stegny Wyszogród
- 2012: MDK Król Maciuś Club Płock
- 2013: Stegny Wyszogród
- 2013–2016: FCB Escola Varsovia
- 2016–2019: Chelsea

Senior career*
Years	Team	Apps	(Gls)
2019–2022	Paris Saint-Germain	2	(0)
2020–2021	→ Cartagena (loan)	3	(0)
2021	→ Châteauroux (loan)	9	(0)
2021–2022	→ Nice (loan)	1	(0)
2022–2025	Nice	70	(0)
2025–	Neom	13	(0)

International career^{‡}
2017	Poland U18	1	(0)
2018	Poland U19	3	(0)
2019–2020	Poland U20	3	(0)
2019	Poland U21	1	(0)
2023–	Poland	10	(0)
- * Club domestic league appearances and goals as of 21:03, 20 September 2026 (UTC) ‡ National team caps and goals as of 16:03, 6 October 2026 (UTC)

Marcin Bułka (Polish pronunciation: [ˈmart͡ɕin ˈbuwka]; born 4 October 1999) is a Polish professional footballer who plays as a goalkeeper for Saudi Pro League club Neom and the Poland national team.

== Club career ==
=== Early career ===
Bułka began his career in his native Poland, playing in the youth ranks at Stegny Wyszogród, MDK Król Maciuś Club Płock and FCB Escola Varsovia, an official Barcelona satellite academy in Poland. In March 2016, whilst at FCB Escola Varsovia, Bułka underwent a trial with Barcelona, before trialling at English club Chelsea the following month.

=== Chelsea ===
In the summer of 2016, Bułka joined Chelsea. In September 2016, he signed his first professional contract with the club as well as making his under-18 debut for in a 4–2 win against Arsenal U18.

=== Paris Saint-Germain ===
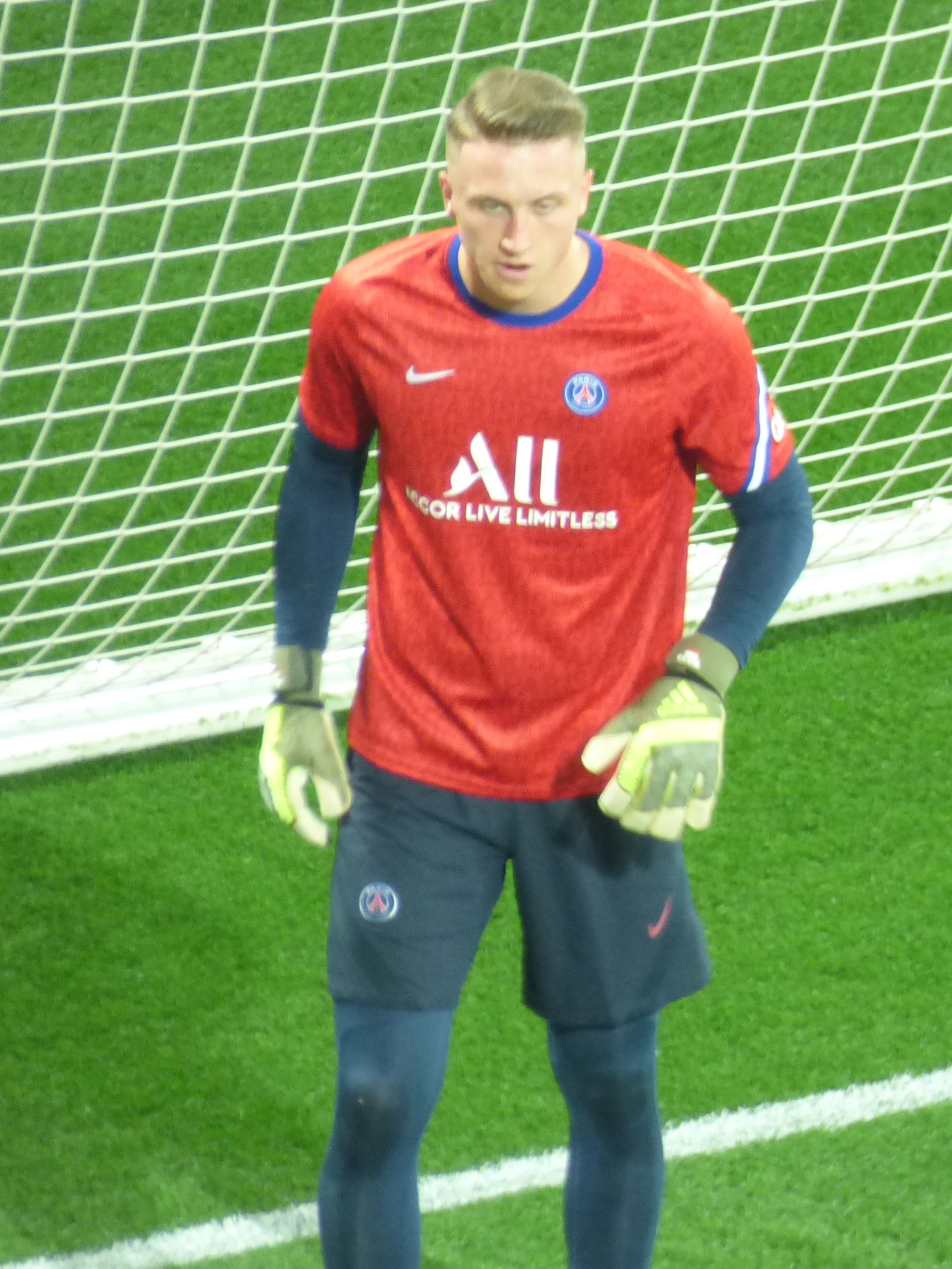
Bułka in 2020 with Paris Saint-Germain

==== 2019–20: Debut season ====
After his contract at Chelsea expired, Bułka signed for Ligue 1 club Paris Saint-Germain on a two-year contract. On 30 August 2019, he made his debut for the club, keeping a clean sheet in a 2–0 win against Metz.

==== 2020–21: Cartagena and Châteauroux loans ====
Bułka made his first and only appearance for PSG in the 2020–21 season in the first match of the campaign on 10 September 2020, which was against newly-promoted Lens. With Keylor Navas and Sergio Rico absent, he would play the entirety of the match, but made a costly mistake that handed Lens a 1–0 win.

On 28 September, Bułka signed a contract extension with Paris Saint-Germain until June 2025. He was immediately loaned out to Spanish Segunda División club Cartagena. Eventually, his loan was cut short, and he left in the January transfer window.

On 31 January 2021, Ligue 2 club Châteauroux signed Bułka on loan until the end of the season. He made his debut in a 4–0 win against Chambly on 2 February. However, in late February, he suffered an injury to his right ankle, ruling him out of play for "several weeks" according to the club. Bułka made his return to play in a 1–0 loss to Toulouse on 17 April.

=== Nice ===
On 5 August 2021, Bułka joined Ligue 1 side Nice on loan with an option-to-buy. During the 2021–22 season, he played in all of the club's Coupe de France matches, and one league match against Clermont. On 1 June 2022, his move to Nice was made permanent.

=== Neom ===
On 5 July 2025, Bułka signed for Saudi Pro League club Neom. He made his first official appearance in a 0–1 league loss to Al-Ahli on 28 August. On 9 September, it was announced Bułka had suffered an ACL tear during training, sidelining him for several months. He made his return on 28 April 2026, playing the full 90 minutes in a 1–1 draw against Al-Hazem.

== International career ==
After previously representing Poland at under-18 and under-19 level, on 6 September 2018, Bułka made his under-20 debut for Poland against Italy in a 3–0 loss.

On 4 September 2023, he received his first senior team call-up for the UEFA Euro 2024 qualifying matches against Faroe Islands and Albania, on 7 and 10 September 2023 respectively, replacing the injured Kamil Grabara. Bułka made his debut the same year on 21 November in a friendly match against Latvia.

On 7 June 2024, he was selected in the 26-man squad for UEFA Euro 2024 as a third-choice goalkeeper behind Wojciech Szczęsny and Łukasz Skorupski, and remained on the bench for all three of Poland's fixtures at the tournament.

== Personal life ==
On 27 May 2020, Bułka was involved in a traffic collision near the town of Wyszogród, Poland. He was driving a rented Lamborghini on a motorway and collided with an individual driving a Hyundai in the opposite direction while attempting an overtake maneuver. A 56–year old man was injured during the crash and suffered several fractures, while Bułka was left unharmed. Bułka admitted responsibility for the collision. It was reported that he could face up to three years in jail after potentially breaking article 177 of Polish law.

== Career statistics ==
=== Club ===
As of match played 13 September 2026

Appearances and goals by club, season and competition
Club	Season	League			National cup (Note: Includes Copa del Rey, Coupe de France, King's Cup)		Europe		Other		Total	
Club	Season	Division	Apps	Goals	Apps	Goals	Apps	Goals	Apps	Goals	Apps	Goals
Chelsea U21	2017–18	—			—		—		4 (Note: Appearances in EFL Trophy)	0	4	0
Paris Saint-Germain	2019–20	Ligue 1	1	0	0	0	0	0	0	0	1	0
Paris Saint-Germain	2020–21	Ligue 1	1	0	0	0	0	0	0	0	1	0
Paris Saint-Germain	Total		2	0	0	0	0	0	0	0	2	0
Cartagena (loan)	2020–21	Segunda División	3	0	1	0	—		—		4	0
Châteauroux (loan)	2020–21	Ligue 2	9	0	0	0	—		—		9	0
Nice (loan)	2021–22	Ligue 1	1	0	5	0	—		—		6	0
Nice	2022–23	Ligue 1	2	0	0	0	3 (Note: Appearances in UEFA Europa Conference League)	0	—		5	0
Nice	2023–24	Ligue 1	34	0	4	0	—		—		38	0
Nice	2024–25	Ligue 1	34	0	0	0	6 (Note: Appearances in UEFA Europa League)	0	—		40	0
Nice	Total		71	0	9	0	9	0	—		89	0
Neom	2025–26	Saudi Pro League	6	0	0	0	—		—		6	0
Neom	2026–27	Saudi Pro League	7	0	1	0	—		—		8	0
Neom	Total		13	0	1	0	—		—		14	0
Career total			98	0	11	0	9	0	4	0	122	0

=== International ===
As of match played 5 October 2026

Appearances and goals by national team and year
National team	Year	Apps	Goals
Poland	2023	1	0
Poland	2024	3	0
Poland	2025	1	0
Poland	2026	5	0
Total		10	0

== Honours ==
Chelsea

- U18 Premier League: 2016–17, 2017–18
- FA Youth Cup: 2016–17, 2017–18
- U18 Premier League Cup: 2017–18
- UEFA Youth League runner-up: 2017–18

Paris Saint-Germain

- Ligue 1: 2019–20
- UEFA Champions League runner-up: 2019–20

Nice

- Coupe de France runner-up: 2021–22

Individual

- UNFP Ligue 1 Player of the Month: September 2023
- Polish Newcomer of the Year: 2023
