= Romain Grange =

French footballer (born 1988)

Personal information
- Date of birth: 21 July 1988 (age 38)
- Place of birth: Châteauroux, France
- Height: 1.77 m (5 ft 10 in)
- Position: Winger

Senior career*
Years	Team	Apps	(Gls)
2008–2012	Châteauroux	87	(11)
2012–2015	Nancy	54	(5)
2015–2016	Paris	30	(6)
2016–2018	Niort	50	(7)
2018–2019	Charleroi	18	(0)
2019	→ Grenoble (loan)	18	(4)
2019–2023	Châteauroux	69	(14)
2023	Châteauroux B	1	(0)
- * Club domestic league appearances and goals as of 3 March 2023

Romain Grange (born 21 July 1988) is a French professional footballer who plays as a winger.

== Career ==
Born in Châteauroux, Grange started his career with hometown team LB Châteauroux in 2008, making his debut as a substitute for Rudy Haddad in the 1–0 win over Boulogne on 13 March 2009. He spent four seasons with the club, making almost 100 appearances in all competitions.

In May 2012, he signed a three-year contract with Ligue 1 side AS Nancy. He went on to play 54 league matches for the club, scoring five goals.

At the end of his contract, Grange joined newly promoted Ligue 2 outfit Paris FC on a free transfer. While Paris was relegated at the end of the 2015–16 season, he ended the campaign as the club's top goalscorer with 6 goals in 30 appearances.

On 8 June 2016, Grange signed a three-year contract with Niort, where he was reunited with former Paris manager Denis Renaud.

In January 2017, he moved to Belgium, signing a 2.5-year contract with the option of a further year with Belgian First Division A Charleroi.

== Career statistics ==
As of match played 15 December 2017

Appearances and goals by club, season and competition
Club	Season	League			National cup		Coupe de la Ligue		Total	
Club	Season	Division	Apps	Goals	Apps	Goals	Apps	Goals	Apps	Goals
Châteauroux	2008–09	Ligue 2	3	0	0	0	0	0	3	0
Châteauroux	2009–10	Ligue 2	19	4	1	0	1	0	21	4
Châteauroux	2010–11	Ligue 2	34	4	2	1	1	0	37	5
Châteauroux	2011–12	Ligue 2	31	3	5	2	1	0	37	5
Châteauroux	Total		87	11	8	3	3	0	98	14
Nancy	2012–13	Ligue 1	20	2	2	0	1	0	23	2
Nancy	2013–14	Ligue 2	12	0	2	0	1	0	15	0
Nancy	2014–15	Ligue 2	22	3	1	0	2	1	25	4
Nancy	Total		54	5	5	0	4	1	63	6
Paris FC	2015–16	Ligue 2	30	6	2	0	1	0	33	6
Chamois Niortais	2016–17	Ligue 2	33	3	4	1	1	0	38	4
Chamois Niortais	2017–18	Ligue 2	17	4	2	2	1	1	20	7
Chamois Niortais	Total		50	7	6	3	2	1	58	11
Sporting Charleroi	2017–18	First Division A	0	0	0	0	—		0	0
Career total			221	29	21	6	10	2	252	37
