= Jérémy Cordoval =

Footballer (born 1997)

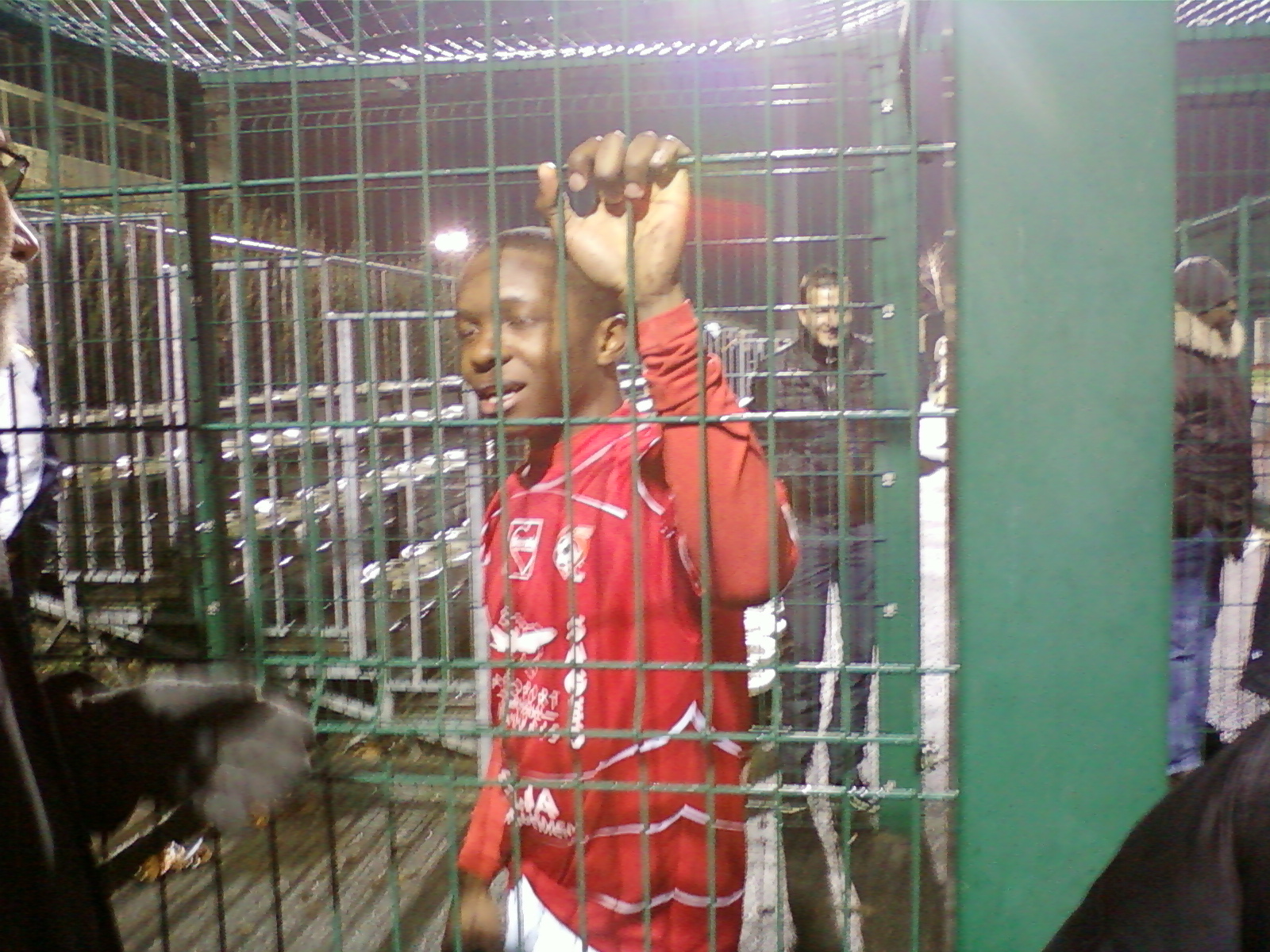
- Cordoval with AS Beauvais in January 2011

Personal information
- Date of birth: 12 January 1997 (age 29)
- Place of birth: Villeneuve-Saint-Georges, France
- Height: 1.67 m (5 ft 6 in)
- Position: Right-back

Team information
- Current team: Hyères
- Number: 20

Senior career*
Years	Team	Apps	(Gls)
2008–2010	Troyes	9	(0)
2010–2011	Beauvais	37	(0)
2011–2012	Cannes	20	(0)
2012–2013	Créteil	35	(0)
2013–2016	Nîmes	104	(0)
2013	Nîmes B	1	(0)
2016–2019	Troyes	67	(1)
2017	Troyes B	5	(0)
2019–2021	Châteauroux	26	(0)
2019	Châteauroux B	1	(0)
2021–	Hyères	42	(1)

International career
2019	Guadeloupe	2	(0)
- * Club domestic league appearances and goals as of 18:10, 29 May 2023 (UTC)

Jérémy Cordoval (born 12 January 1990) is a professional footballer who plays as a right-back for Championnat National 1 club Hyères. Born in metropolitan France, he played two matches for the Guadeloupe national team in 2019.

== Club career ==
In June 2016, it was announced Cordoval would be rejoining Troyes for a second stint, signing a three-year contract.

On 4 August 2021, Cordoval moved to Hyères in the fourth-tier Championnat National 2.

== International career ==
Cordoval made his debut for the Guadeloupe national team on 23 March 2019 in a CONCACAF Nations League qualifier against Martinique, as a starter.

== Honours ==
Créteil

- Championnat National: 2012–13
