= Nama Fofana =

French footballer (born 1990)

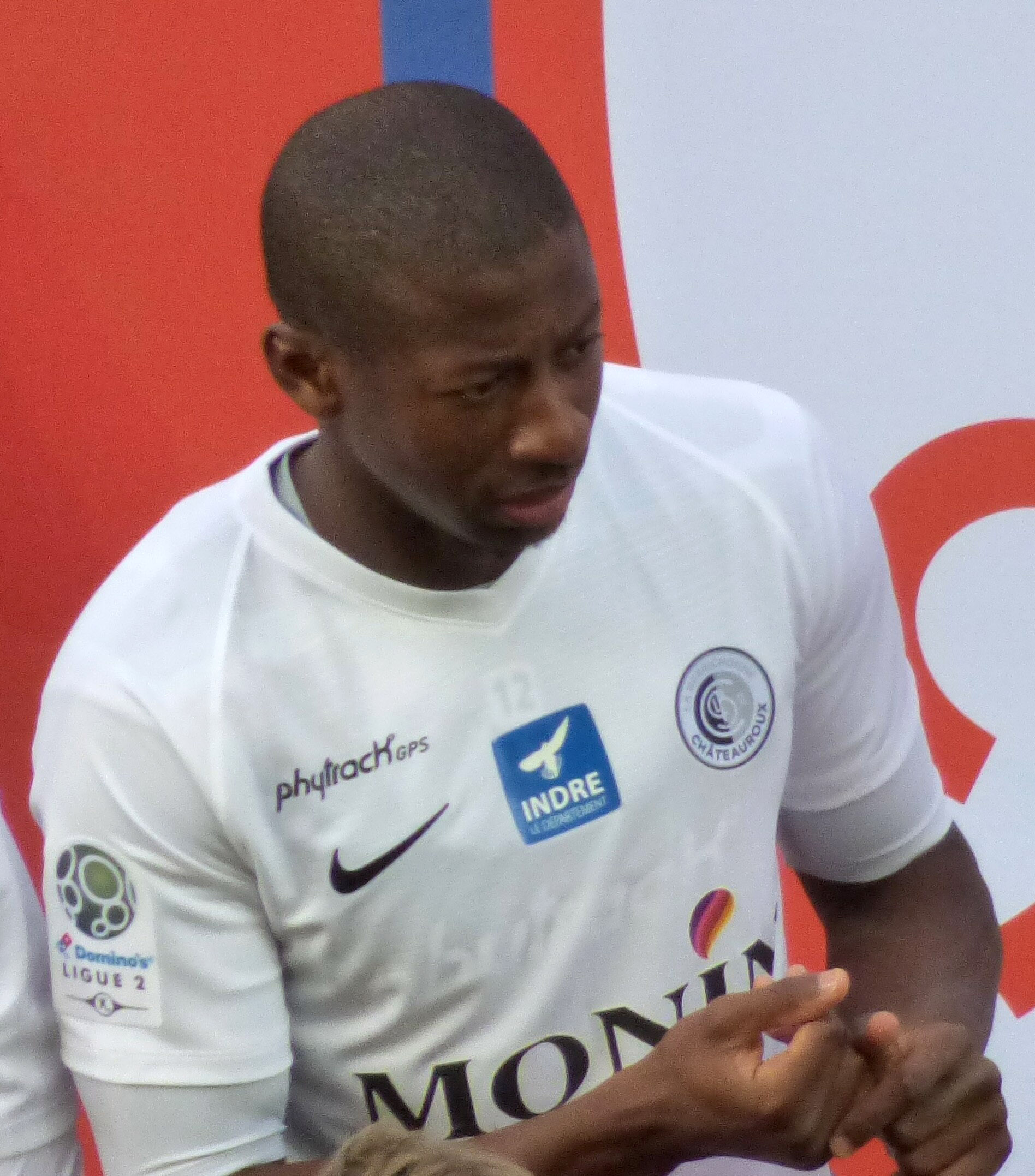
- Fofana with Châteauroux in 2018

Personal information
- Date of birth: 12 July 1990 (age 36)
- Place of birth: Créteil, France
- Height: 1.80 m (5 ft 11 in)
- Position: Defender

Team information
- Current team: Créteil
- Number: 12

Senior career*
| Years | Team | Apps | (Gls) |
| 2011–2013 | Créteil | 4 | (0) |
| 2013–2014 | Luçon | 10 | (0) |
| 2014–2015 | Consolat Marseille | 25 | (0) |
| 2015–2023 | Châteauroux | 140 | (3) |
| 2019–2022 | Châteauroux B | 11 | (1) |
| 2024 | Créteil | 10 | (0) |
| 2024–2025 | Bordeaux | 19 | (0) |
| 2025– | Créteil | 8 | (0) |
- * Club domestic league appearances and goals as of 11:39, 28 August 2024 (UTC)

Nama Fofana (born 12 July 1990) is a French professional footballer who plays as a defender for Championnat National 1 club Créteil.

== Personal life ==
Nama Fofana was born in Créteil in the southeastern suburbs of Paris. He holds French and Malian nationalities.

== Career statistics ==
As of 15 November 2015.

Appearances and goals by club, season and competition
| Club | Season | League | | | Cup | | League Cup | | Total | |
| Club | Season | Division | Apps | Goals | Apps | Goals | Apps | Goals | Apps | Goals |
|---|---|---|---|---|---|---|---|---|---|---|
| Créteil | 2011–12 | National | 3 | 0 | 0 | 0 | 0 | 0 | 3 | 0 |
| Créteil | 2012–13 | National | 1 | 0 | 0 | 0 | 0 | 0 | 1 | 0 |
| Créteil | Total | | 4 | 0 | 0 | 0 | ß | 0 | 4 | 0 |
| Luçon | 2013–14 | National | 10 | 0 | 0 | 0 | 0 | 0 | 10 | 0 |
| Consolat Marseille | 2014–15 | National | 25 | 0 | 4 | 0 | 0 | 0 | 29 | 0 |
| Châteauroux | 2015–16 | National | 7 | 0 | 1 | 0 | 1 | 0 | 9 | 0 |
| Career total | | | 46 | 0 | 5 | 0 | 1 | 0 | 52 | 0 |
