= Alexis Gonçalves =

Association football player (born 1997)

Personal information
- Full name: Alexis Gonçalves Pereira
- Date of birth: 4 April 1997 (age 29)
- Place of birth: Nantua, France
- Height: 1.81 m (5 ft 11 in)
- Position: Forward

Team information
- Current team: Cannes
- Number: 14

Youth career
- 2011–2014: Jura Sud
- 2014–2015: Dijon

Senior career*
Years	Team	Apps	(Gls)
2015–2017	Dijon II	28	(6)
2017–2018	Grasse	18	(9)
2018–2019	Toulon	31	(7)
2019	Châteauroux II	3	(1)
2019–2021	Châteauroux	36	(5)
2021–2022	RWDM	10	(0)
2022	→ Francs Borains (loan)	6	(1)
2022–2024	GOAL FC	52	(14)
2024–	Cannes	5	(0)

International career
2021–	Cape Verde	1	(0)
- * Club domestic league appearances and goals as of 19 October 2024

Alexis Gonçalves Pereira (born 4 April 1997) is a professional footballer who plays as a forward for Championnat National 1 club Cannes. Born in France, he plays for the Cape Verde national team.

== Club career ==
On 2 September 2019, Gonçalves signed his first professional contract with Châteauroux. He made his professional debut for Châteauroux in a 1–0 Ligue 2 loss to Lens on 16 September 2019.

On 8 July 2021, it was announced that Gonçalves had signed a one-year contract with the option of an additional year with Belgian First Division B club RWDM. On 26 January 2022, Gonçalves was loaned to Francs Borains in the third-tier Belgian National Division 1.

On 15 June 2022, Gonçalves signed for Championnat National 2 club GOAL FC.

== International career ==
Gonçalves holds both French and Cape Verdean nationalities. He was called up to the Cape Verde national team for a pair of friendlies in June 2021. He debuted with the Cape Verde national team in a friendly 2–0 loss to Senegal on 8 June 2021.

== Career statistics ==
=== Career ===
As of 10 March 2024

Appearances and goals by club, season and competition
Club	Season	League			National cup (Note: Includes Coupe de France, Belgian Cup)		Total	
Club	Season	Division	Apps	Goals	Apps	Goals	Apps	Goals
Dijon II	2015-16	Championnat National 3	11	2	—		11	2
Dijon II	2016-17	Championnat National 3	17	4	—		17	4
Dijon II			28	6	—		28	6
Grasse	2017-18	Championnat National 2	18	9	—		18	9
Toulon	2018-19	Championnat National 2	29	6	1	0	30	6
Toulon	2019-20	Championnat National	5	1	0	0	5	1
Toulon	Total		34	7	1	0	35	7
Châteauroux II	2019-20	Championnat National 3	3	1	—		3	1
Châteauroux	2019-20	Ligue 2	16	3	1	0	17	3
Châteauroux	2020-21	Ligue 2	20	2	1	0	21	2
Châteauroux	Total		36	5	2	0	38	5
RWDM	2021-22	Challenger Pro League	10	0	1	0	11	0
Francs Borains (loan)	2021-22	Belgian National Division 1	6	1	—		6	1
GOAL FC	2022-23	Championnat National 2	29	10	—		29	10
GOAL FC	2023-24	Championnat National	21	4	—		21	4
GOAL FC	Total		50	14	—|		50	14
Career Total			185	43	4	0	189	43
