= Guévin Tormin =

French footballer (born 1997)

Personal information
- Full name: Guévin Pius Richard Tormin
- Date of birth: 27 October 1997 (age 29)
- Place of birth: Asnières-sur-Seine, France
- Height: 1.74 m (5 ft 9 in)
- Position: Midfielder

Team information
- Current team: Vierzon

Youth career
- 2003–2012: Red Star
- 2012–2016: Monaco

Senior career*
Years	Team	Apps	(Gls)
2016–2019	Monaco B	31	(6)
2017–2019	→ Cercle Brugge (loan)	53	(8)
2019–2021	Châteauroux	25	(3)
2021–2022	Manisa	5	(2)
2022	→ Mafra (loan)	2	(0)
2024–	Vierzon	2	(0)

International career
2014	France U17	5	(0)
2015	France U18	3	(0)
2015	France U19	3	(0)
- * Club domestic league appearances and goals as of 7 December 2024

Guévin Pius Richard Tormin (born 28 October 1997) is a French professional footballer who plays as a midfielder for Championnat National 3 club Vierzon.

== Career ==
On 30 July 2021, Tormin signed with Turkish TFF First League club Manisa after having played two seasons for Châteauroux in Ligue 2.

== Personal life ==
Tormin is the brother of the footballer Tyrone Tormin.
