= 2023–24 Stade Brestois 29 season =

Stade Brestois 29
2023–24 season
- President: Denis Le Saint
- Head coach: Éric Roy
- Stadium: Stade Francis-Le Blé
- Ligue 1: 3rd
- Coupe de France: Round of 16
- Top goalscorer: League: Romain Del Castillo (8); All: Romain Del Castillo (8)
- Average home league attendance: 15,391
Home colours	Away colours	Third colours

The 2023–24 season was Stade Brestois 29's 74th season in existence and fifth consecutive season in Ligue 1. They also competed in the Coupe de France.

== Players ==
=== First-team squad ===
As of 1 February 2024

Note: Flags indicate national team as defined under FIFA eligibility rules; some limited exceptions apply. Players may hold more than one non-FIFA nationality.

No.	Pos.	Nation	Player
2	DF	FRA	Bradley Locko
3	DF	FRA	Lilian Brassier
5	DF	FRA	Brendan Chardonnet (captain)
7	FW	URU	Martín Satriano (on loan from Inter Milan)
8	MF	FRA	Hugo Magnetti
9	FW	BEN	Steve Mounié
10	FW	FRA	Romain Del Castillo
11	FW	FRA	Axel Camblan
12	DF	CIV	Luck Zogbé
14	FW	FRA	Adrien Lebeau
16	GK	FRA	Yan Marillat
18	DF	FRA	Antonin Cartillier (on loan from Monaco)

No.	Pos.	Nation	Player
19	DF	FRA	Jordan Amavi (on loan from Marseille)
20	MF	FRA	Pierre Lees-Melou (vice-captain)
21	FW	ALG	Billal Brahimi (on loan from Nice)
22	FW	FRA	Jérémy Le Douaron
23	MF	MLI	Kamory Doumbia (on loan from Reims)
25	DF	FRA	Julien Le Cardinal (on loan from Lens)
26	MF	POR	Mathias Pereira Lage
27	DF	FRA	Kenny Lala
28	MF	FRA	Jonas Martin
30	GK	FRA	Grégoire Coudert
40	GK	NED	Marco Bizot
45	MF	FRA	Mahdi Camara

=== Out on loan ===
Note: Flags indicate national team as defined under FIFA eligibility rules; some limited exceptions apply. Players may hold more than one non-FIFA nationality.

No.	Pos.	Nation	Player
4	DF	MAR	Achraf Dari (at Charleroi until end of season)
18	MF	FRA	Hiang'a Mbock (at Caen until end of season)
44	DF	FRA	Josué Escartin (at Ajaccio until end of season)

No.	Pos.	Nation	Player
70	MF	ENG	Karamoko Dembélé (at Blackpool until end of season)
97	FW	FRA	Taïryk Arconte (at Rodez until end of season)

== Transfers ==
=== In ===
Pos.	Player	Transferred from	Fee	Date	Source
MF	(France) Mahdi Camara	(France) Saint-Étienne	€3,000,000	1 July 2023	
FW	(Uruguay) Martín Satriano	(Italy) Internazionale	Loan	14 July 2023	
MF	(France) Jonas Martin	Unattached	Free	19 July 2023	
MF	(France) Bradley Locko	(France) Reims	€500,000	27 July 2023	
MF	(France) Adrien Lebeau	(Germany) Waldhof Mannheim	Free	4 August 2023	
DF	(France) Jordan Amavi	(France) Marseille	Loan	31 August 2023	
FW	(Algeria) Billal Brahimi	(France) Nice	Loan	1 September 2023	
FW	(Mali) Kamory Doumbia	(France) Reims	Loan	1 September 2023	

=== Out ===
Pos.	Player	Transferred to	Fee	Date	Source
MF	(Algeria) Haris Belkebla	Released		1 July 2023	
DF	(Senegal) Noah Fadiga	Contract termination		10 July 2023	
MF	(France) Franck Honorat	(Germany) Borussia Mönchengladbach	€8,000,000	11 July 2023	
FW	(France) Taïryk Arconte	(France) Rodez	Loan	21 August 2023	
FW	(England) Karamoko Dembélé	(England) Blackpool	Loan	30 August 2023	
DF	(France) Christophe Hérelle	(France) Metz		1 September 2023	

== Pre-season and friendlies ==
Win Draw Loss Fixtures

15 July 2023 Friendly	Brest (France)	2–0	(France) Avranches	Dinard
18:00 UTC+2				Stadium: Stade Paul Audrin

22 July 2023 Friendly	Brest (France)	2–1	(France) Concarneau	Plouvorn
18:00 UTC+2				Stadium: Stade Guy de Reals

26 July 2023 Friendly	Brest (France)	0–1	(France) Rennes	Dinan
18:00 UTC+2				Stadium: Stade du Clos Gastel

29 July 2023 Friendly	Guingamp (France)	0–1	(France) Brest	Guingamp
17:00 CEST (UTC+2)			Le Douaron 14'	Stadium: Stade du Roudourou

5 August 2023 Friendly	Brest (France)	1–1	(Italy) Cagliari	Brest, France
18:00 UTC+2	Satriano 57'		Pavoletti 70'	Stadium: Stade Francis-Le Blé; Referee: François Letexier (France)

== Competitions ==
=== Overall record ===
Competition	First match	Last match	Starting round	Final position	Record							
Competition	First match	Last match	Starting round	Final position	Pld	W	D	L	GF	GA	GD	Win %
Ligue 1	13 August 2023	19 May 2024	Matchday 1	3rd	34	17	10	7	53	34	+19	50.00
Coupe de France	6 January 2024	7 February 2024	Round of 64	Round of 16	3	2	0	1	4	4	+0	66.67
Total					37	19	10	8	57	38	+19	51.35

Source: Soccerway

=== Ligue 1 ===
==== League table ====
Pos	Team	Pld	W	D	L	GF	GA	GD	Pts	Qualification or relegation
1	Paris Saint-Germain (C)	34	22	10	2	81	33	+48	76	Qualification for the Champions League league phase
2	Monaco	34	20	7	7	68	42	+26	67	Qualification for the Champions League league phase
3	Brest	34	17	10	7	53	34	+19	61	Qualification for the Champions League league phase
4	Lille	34	16	11	7	52	34	+18	59	Qualification for the Champions League third qualifying round
5	Nice	34	15	10	9	40	29	+11	55	Qualification for the Europa League league phase (Note: Since the 2023–24 Coupe de France winners, Paris Saint-Germain, qualified for the Champions League via league position, the Europa League berth awarded to the cup winners was passed to the sixth-placed team and the Conference League berth was passed to the seventh-placed team.)

Source: Ligue 1
Rules for classification: 1) Points; 2) Goal difference; 3) Head-to-head points; 4) Head-to-head goal difference; 5) Head-to-head goals scored; 6) Head-to-head away goals scored; 7) Goals scored; 8) Away goals scored; 9) Fair-play points (Note: Head-to-head record is used only after all the matches between the teams in question have been played).
(C) Champions

==== Results summary ====
Overall								Home						Away					
Pld	W	D	L	GF	GA	GD	Pts	W	D	L	GF	GA	GD	W	D	L	GF	GA	GD
34	17	10	7	53	34	+19	61	8	7	2	25	14	+11	9	3	5	28	20	+8

Source: Ligue 1

==== Results by round ====
Round	1	2	3	4	5	6	7	8	9	10	11	12	13	14	15	16	17	18	19	20	21	22	23	24	25	26	27	28	29	30	31	32	33	34
Ground	H	A	A	H	A	H	A	H	A	H	A	H	A	H	A	A	H	H	A	H	A	H	A	H	A	H	A	H	A	H	A	H	H	A
Result	W	W	L	D	W	W	D	D	L	L	L	W	W	D	W	W	W	W	D	D	D	W	W	W	L	D	W	W	L	L	W	D	D	W
Position	3	2	4	5	2	1	2	4	5	6	6	8	7	7	5	5	4	3	3	3	4	2	2	2	2	2	2	2	2	3	3	3	4	3

Source: Ligue 1
A = Away; H = Home; W = Win; D = Draw; L = Loss

==== Matches ====
The league fixtures were unveiled on 29 June 2023.

13 August 2023 1	Brest	3–2	Lens	Brest
13:00 CEST (UTC+2)	Lees-Melou (yellow card) 35'; Del Castillo 45+2' (pen.), 87' (pen.); Brassier (yellow card) 45+4'; Lala 56'	Report	Sotoca 11', (yellow card) 48'; Machado 22'; Medina (yellow card) 52'; Thomasson (yellow card) 82', (red card) 82'; Samba (yellow card) 85'	Stadium: Stade Francis-Le Blé; Attendance: 15,085; Referee: Jérémie Pignard

20 August 2023 2	Le Havre	1–2	Brest	Le Havre
15:00 CEST (UTC+2)	Kuzyayev 52'	Report	Del Castillo 28'; Camara (yellow card) 47'; Brassier 56'; Camblan (yellow card) 89'	Stadium: Stade Océane; Attendance: 19,575; Referee: Florent Batta

26 August 2023 3	Marseille	2–0	Brest	Marseille
19:00 CEST (UTC+2)	Mbemba 4'; Sarr 65'	Report	Satriano (yellow card) 74'	Stadium: Stade Vélodrome; Attendance: 63,592; Referee: Jérémy Stinat

2 September 2023 4	Brest	0–0	Rennes	Brest
17:00 CEST (UTC+2)	Del Castillo (yellow card) 27'; Martin (yellow card) 80'; Chardonnet (yellow card) 90+3'	Report	Assignon (yellow card) 74'	Stadium: Stade Francis-Le Blé; Attendance: 15,021; Referee: Hakim Ben El Hadj

17 September 2023 5	Reims	1–2	Brest	Reims
15:00 CEST (UTC+2)	Richardson 19'; Matusiwa (yellow card) 22'; De Smet (yellow card) 52'	Report	Lala (yellow card) 18'; Magnetti (yellow card) 36'; Camara 50'; Lees-Melou 56'; Mounié (yellow card) 88'; Bizot (yellow card) 90+2'	Stadium: Stade Auguste-Delaune; Attendance: 12,948; Referee: Gaël Angoula

23 September 2023 6	Brest	1–0	Lyon	Brest
21:00 CEST (UTC+2)	Lees-Melou (yellow card) 31'; Camara (yellow card) 64'; Brassier (yellow card) 81'; Mounié 87'	Report	Nuamah (yellow card) 10'	Stadium: Stade Francis-Le Blé; Attendance: 14,636; Referee: Thomas Léonard

1 October 2023 7	Nice	0–0	Brest	Nice
15:00 CEST (UTC+2)	Atal (yellow card) 60'	Report	Mounié (yellow card) 5'; Camara (yellow card) 34'; Chardonnet (yellow card) 62'	Stadium: Allianz Riviera; Attendance: 32,044; Referee: Romain Lissorgue

8 October 2023 8	Brest	1–1	Toulouse	Brest
15:00 CEST (UTC+2)	Camara (yellow card) 45+5'; Brassier (yellow card) 70'; Satriano 90+3'	Report	Spierings (yellow card) 10'; Magri 27', (yellow card) 79'	Stadium: Stade Francis-Le Blé; Attendance: 14,509; Referee: Pierre Gaillouste

22 October 2023 9	Lille	1–0	Brest	Villeneuve-d'Ascq
15:00 CEST (UTC+2)	Yazıcı 6'; André (yellow card) 45+4'; Haraldsson (yellow card) 78'	Report	Le Douaron (yellow card) 41'; Camblan (yellow card) 79'; Brahimi (yellow card) 84'	Stadium: Stade Pierre-Mauroy; Attendance: 34,358; Referee: Hakim Ben El Hadj

29 October 2023 10	Brest	2–3	Paris Saint-Germain	Brest
13:00 CET (UTC+1)	Mounié 43'; Le Douaron 52'; Brassier (yellow card) 86'; Martin (yellow card) 87'; Bizot (yellow card) 88'	Report	Zaïre-Emery 16'; Mbappé 28', 89', (penalty missed) 89', (yellow card) 90'; Hakimi (yellow card) 87'; Fabián (yellow card) 88'; Kolo Muani (yellow card) 90+4'	Stadium: Stade Francis-Le Blé; Attendance: 15,183; Referee: Jérôme Brisard

5 November 2023 11	Monaco	2–0	Brest	Monaco
17:05 CET (UTC+1)	Zakaria 17'; Golovin (yellow card) 62', (goal) 70'; Fofana (yellow card) 88'	Report	Locko (yellow card) 8'; Brassier (yellow card) 62' (yellow-red card) 90+2'; Lees-Melou (yellow card) 67'	Stadium: Stade Louis II; Attendance: 9,244; Referee: Eric Wattellier

26 November 2023 13	Montpellier	1–3	Brest	Montpellier
15:00 CET (UTC+1)	Savanier (yellow card) 24', (goal) 51' (pen.); Adams (yellow card) 90+6'	Report	Estève 20' (o.g.); Lees-Melou (yellow card) 30'; Del Castillo (yellow card) 45'; Pereira Lage 64'; Doumbia 90+3'	Stadium: Stade de la Mosson; Attendance: 12,311; Referee: Pierre Gaillouste

3 December 2023 14	Brest	3–0	Clermont	Brest
15:00 CET (UTC+1)	Del Castillo 20' (pen.), 51'; Pereira Lage 34'; Locko (yellow card) 44'	Report	Konaté (yellow card) 19'; Zeffane (yellow card) 70'	Stadium: Stade Francis-Le Blé; Attendance: 14,324; Referee: Marc Bollengier

7 December 2023 12	Brest	1–1	Strasbourg	Brest
20:30 CET (UTC+1)	Magnetti (yellow card) 35'; Le Douaron 44'	Report	Emegha 80'	Stadium: Stade Francis-Le Blé; Attendance: 14,569; Referee: Jérémie Pignard
Note: The match was originally scheduled for 12 November 2023, but was postponed due to damage caused by Storm Ciarán.

10 December 2023 15	Metz	0–1	Brest	Metz
15:00 CET (UTC+1)	Hérelle (yellow card) 40'; Elisor (yellow card) 42'; Jallow (yellow card) 59'	Report	Lala (yellow card) 2'; Lees-Melou (yellow card) 14'; Le Douaron 75'	Stadium: Stade Saint-Symphorien; Attendance: 20,157; Referee: Romain Lissorgue

17 December 2023 16	Nantes	0–2	Brest	Nantes
13:00 CET (UTC+1)	Lafont (yellow card) 78'	Report	Camara (yellow card) 45'; Magnetti 50'; Mounié 57'; Le Douaron (yellow card) 86'; Satriano (yellow card) 90'	Stadium: Stade de la Beaujoire; Attendance: 30,075; Referee: Benoît Millot

20 December 2023 17	Brest	4–0	Lorient	Brest
21:00 CET (UTC+1)	Doumbia 22', 25', 29', 45+3'; Brassier (yellow card) 87'	Report	Kroupi (yellow card) 70'; Igor Silva (yellow card) 86'	Stadium: Stade Francis-Le Blé; Attendance: 14,544; Referee: Mathieu Vernice

14 January 2024 18	Brest	2–0	Montpellier	Brest
15:00 CET (UTC+1)	Magnetti (yellow card) 45', (goal) 48'; Le Douaron 90+2'	Report	Chotard (yellow card) 44'; Julien (yellow card) 57'	Stadium: Stade Francis-Le Blé; Attendance: 12,712; Referee: Jérémie Pignard

28 January 2024 19	Paris Saint-Germain	2–2	Brest	Paris
20:45 CET (UTC+1)	Hernandez (yellow card) 26'; Asensio 38'; Kolo Muani 45'; K. Mbappé (yellow card) 53'; Zaïre-Emery (yellow card) 58'; Barcola (yellow card) 90+2' (yellow-red card) 90+4'	Report	Lees-Melou (yellow card) 32'; Lala (yellow card) 53'; Camara 55'; Brassier (yellow card) 59'; Pereira Lage 80'	Stadium: Parc des Princes; Attendance: 46,905; Referee: Clément Turpin

4 February 2024 20	Brest	0–0	Nice	Brest
17:05 CET (UTC+1)	Lees-Melou (yellow card) 45'; Camara (yellow card) 55'; Chardonnet (yellow card) 75'	Report	Ndayishimiye (yellow card) 74'	Stadium: Stade Francis-Le Blé; Attendance: 13,442; Referee: Jérémy Stinat

11 February 2024 21	Clermont	1–1	Brest	Clermont-Ferrand
15:00 CET (UTC+1)	Gastien (yellow card) 45'; Caufriez (yellow card) 50'; Kyei 69'; Rashani (red card) 88'	Report	Pereira Lage (yellow card) 7'; Le Cardinal (yellow card) 33'; Lees-Melou 50'; Del Castillo (yellow card) 54'; Martin (yellow card) 75'; Bizot (red card) 88'	Stadium: Stade Gabriel-Montpied; Attendance: 8,893; Referee: Stéphanie Frappart

18 February 2024 22	Brest	1–0	Marseille	Brest
20:45 CET (UTC+1)	Lala (yellow card) 12'; Chardonnet (yellow card) 35'; Mounié (red card) 60'; Lees-Melou 88'; Le Cardinal (yellow card) 90+5'	Report	Balerdi (yellow card) 49'	Stadium: Stade Francis-Le Blé; Attendance: 14,766; Referee: Ruddy Buquet

24 February 2024 23	Strasbourg	0–3	Brest	Strasbourg
21:00 CET (UTC+1)	Guilbert (yellow card) 69'; Nzingoula (yellow card) 90+1'; Andrey Santos (yellow card) 90+2'	Report	Camara 33', 40', 60' (pen.)	Stadium: Stade de la Meinau; Attendance: 25,140; Referee: Jérôme Brisard

3 March 2024 24	Brest	1–0	Le Havre	Brest
15:00 CET (UTC+1)	Lees-Melou 34', (yellow card) 83'; Del Castillo (yellow card) 52'; Martin (yellow card) 72'; Satriano (yellow card) 76'	Report	El Hajjam (yellow card) 55'	Stadium: Stade Francis-Le Blé; Attendance: 14,718; Referee: Pierre Gaillouste

9 March 2024 25	Lens	1–0	Brest	Lens
21:00 CET (UTC+1)	Khusanov (yellow card) 7'; Aguilar 32'	Report	Magnetti (yellow card) 69'; Satriano (yellow card) 90+2'	Stadium: Stade Bollaert-Delelis; Attendance: 38,016; Referee: Stéphanie Frappart

17 March 2024 26	Brest	1–1	Lille	Brest
13:00 CET (UTC+1)	Pereira Lage (yellow card) 27'; Lees-Melou (yellow card) 57'; Satriano 80'; Locko (yellow card) 88'	Report	David 67'	Stadium: Stade Francis-Le Blé; Attendance: 14,774; Referee: Clément Turpin

31 March 2024 27	Lorient	0–1	Brest	Lorient
13:00 CEST (UTC+2)	Dieng (yellow card) 80'	Report	Lala (yellow card) 45+1'; Martin (yellow card) 76'; Brassier (yellow card) 80'; Del Castillo 86'; Brahimi (red card) 90+5'	Stadium: Stade du Moustoir; Attendance: 16,745; Referee: Jérôme Brisard

7 April 2024 28	Brest	4–3	Metz	Brest
13:00 CEST (UTC+2)	Chardonnet 12'; Doumbia 31'; Mounié 36'; Satriano 60'	Report	Traoré 6'; Udol (yellow card) 62'; Mikautadze 74', 80'	Stadium: Stade Francis-Le Blé; Attendance: 14,656; Referee: Benoît Millot

14 April 2024 29	Lyon	4–3	Brest	Décines-Charpieu
20:45 CEST (UTC+2)	Tolisso 18'; Benrahma (yellow card) 57'; Tagliafico (yellow card) 59' (yellow-red card) 87', (goal) 79'; Lacazette 70'; O'Brien (yellow card) 87'; Matić (yellow card) 90+10'; Maitland-Niles 90+15' (pen.)	Report	Brassier (yellow card) 17'; Lees-Melou (yellow card) 45+2' (yellow-red card) 87'; Mounié 60'; Del Castillo 64', 67'; Locko (yellow card) 87'; Bizot (yellow card) 90+11'	Stadium: Parc Olympique Lyonnais; Attendance: 47,958; Referee: Mathieu Vernice

21 April 2024 30	Brest	0–2	Monaco	Brest
17:05 CEST (UTC+2)	Le Cardinal (yellow card) 59'; Lala (yellow card) 69'; Camara (yellow card) 85'; Magnetti (yellow card) 90+2'; Le Douaron (yellow card) 90+6'	Report	Zakaria 40', (yellow card) 44'; Minamino 48'; Akliouche (yellow card) 65'; Ben Seghir (red card) 90+2'; Singo (red card) 90+6'	Stadium: Stade Francis-Le Blé; Attendance: 14,856; Referee: Ruddy Buquet

28 April 2024 31	Rennes	4–5	Brest	Rennes
17:05 CEST (UTC+2)	Kalimuendo 4', 9', (yellow card) 80'; Terrier (yellow card) 45+1', (goal) 79'; Theate 68'; Le Fée (yellow card) 90+6'	Report	Mounié 11'; Omari 47' (o.g.); Satriano 54'; Camara 66'; Lees-Melou (yellow card) 75'; Brassier 90+7'	Stadium: Roazhon Park; Attendance: 28,527; Referee: Benoît Bastien

4 May 2024 32	Brest	0–0	Nantes	Brest
21:00 CEST (UTC+2)	Locko (yellow card) 22'; Lala (yellow card) 59'; Doumbia (yellow card) 87'	Report	Traoré (yellow card) 54'; Chirivella (yellow card) 89'	Stadium: Stade Francis-Le Blé; Attendance: 15,159; Referee: Clément Turpin

10 May 2024 33	Brest	1–1	Reims	Brest
21:00 CEST (UTC+2)	Brassier 45+2', (yellow card) 73'; Magnetti (yellow card) 90+5'	Report	A. Koné (yellow card) 9'; Munetsi 25'; K. Koné (yellow card) 45+2'; Stambouli (yellow card) 62'	Stadium: Stade Francis-Le Blé; Attendance: 14,623; Referee: Jérôme Brisard

19 May 2024 34	Toulouse	0–3	Brest	Toulouse
21:00 CEST (UTC+2)	Mawissa (yellow card) 53'	Report	Camara 48'; Amavi 54', (yellow card) 83'; Pereira Lage (yellow card) 79'; Lala 90'	Stadium: Stadium de Toulouse; Attendance: 28,885; Referee: Jérémie Pignard

=== Coupe de France ===
6 January 2024 Round of 64	Brest	1–0	Angers	Brest
15:30 CET (UTC+1)	Raolisoa 63' (o.g.); Camblan (red card) 90+3'	Report	Lopy (yellow card) 23'; Ferhat (yellow card) 78'	Stadium: Stade Francis-Le Blé; Attendance: 8,507; Referee: Stéphanie Frappart

20 January 2024 Round of 32	Trélissac	1–2	Brest	Trélissac
17:30 CET (UTC+1)	Romil (yellow card) 71'; Bisson 75'	Report	Lala 79' (pen.); Camara (yellow card) 87'; Satriano 89'; Lees-Melou (yellow card) 90+1'	Stadium: Stade Firmin Daudou; Attendance: 2,069; Referee: Jérôme Brisard

7 February 2024 Round of 16	Paris Saint-Germain	3–1	Brest	Paris
21:10 CET (UTC+1)	K. Mbappé 34'; Pereira 37'; Ramos 90+2'	Report	Magnetti (yellow card) 14'; Brassier (yellow card) 60' (yellow-red card) 67'; Mounié 65'	Stadium: Parc des Princes; Attendance: 46,895; Referee: Benoît Bastien

== Statistics ==
=== Appearances and goals ===
No.	Pos	Nat	Player	Total		Ligue 1		Coupe de France	
No.	Pos	Nat	Player	Apps	Goals	Apps	Goals	Apps	Goals
Goalkeepers
1	GK	(France) FRA	Yan Marillat	0	0	0	0	0	0
30	GK	(France) FRA	Grégoire Coudert	6	0	2+1	0	3	0
40	GK	(Netherlands) NED	Marco Bizot	32	0	32	0	0	0
Defenders
2	DF	(France) FRA	Bradley Locko	35	0	33	0	2	0
3	DF	(France) FRA	Lilian Brassier	32	3	30	3	2	0
5	DF	(France) FRA	Brendan Chardonnet	36	1	33	1	1+2	0
12	DF	(Ivory Coast) CIV	Luck Zogbé	2	0	0+1	0	1	0
18	DF	(France) FRA	Antonin Cartillier	0	0	0	0	0	0
19	DF	(France) FRA	Jordan Amavi	2	1	1+1	1	0	0
25	DF	(France) FRA	Julien Le Cardinal	15	0	5+7	0	3	0
27	DF	(France) FRA	Kenny Lala	36	3	33	2	3	1
33	DF	(France) FRA	Tommy Le Verge	0	0	0	0	0	0
Midfielders
8	MF	(France) FRA	Hugo Magnetti	36	2	30+3	2	2+1	0
14	MF	(France) FRA	Adrien Lebeau	9	0	0+7	0	0+2	0
20	MF	(France) FRA	Pierre Lees-Melou	31	4	29	4	1+1	0
23	MF	(Mali) MLI	Kamory Doumbia	26	6	7+18	6	1	0
26	MF	(Portugal) POR	Mathias Pereira Lage	33	3	12+18	3	1+2	0
28	MF	(France) FRA	Jonas Martin	34	0	9+22	0	3	0
45	MF	(France) FRA	Mahdi Camara	35	7	26+6	7	2+1	0
Forwards
7	FW	(Uruguay) URU	Martín Satriano	36	5	21+12	4	3	1
9	FW	(Benin) BEN	Steve Mounié	35	7	20+12	6	1+2	1
10	FW	(France) FRA	Romain Del Castillo	36	8	30+3	8	1+2	0
11	FW	(France) FRA	Axel Camblan	8	0	0+7	0	0+1	0
14	FW	(France) FRA	Adrien Lebeau	7	0	0+7	0	0	0
21	FW	(Algeria) ALG	Billal Brahimi	20	0	1+17	0	1+1	0
22	FW	(France) FRA	Jérémy Le Douaron	35	4	19+14	4	2	0
Players transferred out during the season
4	DF	(Morocco) MAR	Achraf Dari	4	0	1+3	0	0	0
18	MF	(France) FRA	Hianga'a Mbock	2	0	0+2	0	0	0
70	FW	(England) ENG	Karamoko Dembélé	1	0	0+1	0	0	0

=== Goalscorers ===
Position	Players	Ligue 1	Coupe de France	Total
MF	(France) Romain Del Castillo	8	0	8
MF	(France) Mahdi Camara	7	0	7
FW	(Benin) Steve Mounié	6	1	7
MF	(Mali) Kamory Doumbia	6	0	6
FW	(Uruguay) Martín Satriano	4	1	5
MF	(France) Pierre Lees-Melou	4	0	4
DF	(France) Lilian Brassier	3	0	3
DF	(France) Kenny Lala	2	1	3
MF	(Portugal) Mathias Pereira Lage	3	0	3
MF	(France) Hugo Magnetti	2	0	2
DF	(France) Jordan Amavi	1	0	1
DF	(France) Brendan Chardonnet	1	0	1
