= 2020–21 Stade Brestois 29 season =

Stade Brestois 29
2020–21 season
- President: Denis Le Saint
- Head coach: Olivier Dall'Oglio
- Stadium: Stade Francis-Le Blé
- Ligue 1: 17th
- Coupe de France: Round of 32
- Top goalscorer: League: Steve Mounié (9); All: Steve Mounié (10)
- Biggest win: Brest 4–1 Saint-Étienne
- Biggest defeat: Nîmes 4–0 Brest
Home colours	Away colours	Third colours

The 2020–21 season was the 71st season in the existence of Stade Brestois 29 and the club's second consecutive season in the top flight of French football. In addition to the domestic league, Brest participated in this season's edition of the Coupe de France. The season covered the period from 1 July 2020 to 30 June 2021.

== Players ==
=== First-team squad ===
As of 6 February 2021.

Note: Flags indicate national team as defined under FIFA eligibility rules; some limited exceptions apply. Players may hold more than one non-FIFA nationality.

No.	Pos.	Nation	Player
1	GK	FRA	Gautier Larsonneur
2	DF	FRA	Jean-Kévin Duverne (captain)
3	DF	FRA	Lilian Brassier (on loan from Rennes)
4	MF	FRA	Idrissa Dioh
5	DF	FRA	Brendan Chardonnet
6	MF	BRA	Jean Lucas (on loan from Lyon)
7	MF	ALG	Haris Belkebla
8	MF	FRA	Paul Lasne
9	FW	FRA	Franck Honorat
10	FW	FRA	Gaëtan Charbonnier
12	MF	FRA	Romain Philippoteaux
14	FW	FRA	Irvin Cardona
15	FW	BEN	Steve Mounié
16	GK	FRA	Sébastien Cibois

No.	Pos.	Nation	Player
17	DF	FRA	Dénys Bain
18	DF	FRA	Romain Perraud
19	MF	FRA	Ferris N'Goma
20	DF	FRA	Ronaël Pierre-Gabriel (on loan from Mainz)
21	MF	FRA	Romain Faivre
22	MF	FRA	Julien Faussurier
23	DF	FRA	Christophe Hérelle
24	DF	GUF	Ludovic Baal
26	FW	FRA	Jérémy Le Douaron
27	MF	FRA	Hugo Magnetti
28	MF	FRA	Hiang'a Mbock
29	MF	FRA	Bandiougou Fadiga (on loan from Paris Saint-Germain)
30	GK	TUN	Mouez Hassen

=== Out on loan ===
Note: Flags indicate national team as defined under FIFA eligibility rules; some limited exceptions apply. Players may hold more than one non-FIFA nationality.

No.	Pos.	Nation	Player
—	DF	FRA	Guillaume Buon (on loan to Bastia-Borgo)
—	MF	POR	Heriberto Tavares (on loan to Famalicão)
—	FW	COM	Rafiki Saïd (on loan to Stade Briochin)

== Transfers ==
=== In ===
No.	Pos	Player	Transferred from	Fee	Date	Source
15			TBD		1 July 2020	

=== Out ===
No.	Pos	Player	Transferred to	Fee	Date	Source
15			TBD		1 July 2020	

== Pre-season and friendlies ==
Win Draw Loss Fixtures

18 July 2020 Friendly	Stade Plabennec	Cancelled	Brest	Plabennec, France
--:-- CEST (UTC+2)				Stadium: Stade de Kervéguen

25 July 2020 Friendly	Stade Briochin	0–1	Brest	Saint-Brieuc, France
16:00 CEST (UTC+2)				Stadium: Fred-Aubert Stadium

31 July 2020 Friendly	Lorient	2–2	Brest	Lorient, France
17:00 CEST (UTC+2)	Bozok 74' (pen.); Boisgard 78'		Chardonnet 23'; Cardona 35'	Stadium: Stade du Moustoir

8 August 2020 Friendly	Brest	1–2	Rennes	Vannes, France
18:00 CEST (UTC+2)	Saïd 82'		Tait 76'; Gelin 85'	Stadium: Stade de la Rabine; Attendance: 0

12 August 2020 Friendly	Brest	1–0	Guingamp	Brest, France
17:00 CEST (UTC+2)	Benvindo 14'	Report		Stadium: Stade Francis-Le Blé

16 August 2020 Friendly	Lille	1–2	Brest	Villeneuve-d'Ascq, France
17:00 CEST (UTC+2)	David 35'	Report	Belkebla 17'; Chardonnet (yellow card) 58'; Battocchio 84'	Stadium: Stade Pierre-Mauroy

13 November 2020 Friendly	Guingamp	0–1	Brest	Guingamp, France
15:30 CET (UTC+1)			Le Douaron 45'	Stadium: Stade de Roudourou

== Competitions ==
=== Overall record ===
Competition	First match	Last match	Starting round	Final position	Record							
Competition	First match	Last match	Starting round	Final position	Pld	W	D	L	GF	GA	GD	Win %
Ligue 1	23 August 2020	23 May 2021	Matchday 1	17th	38	11	8	19	50	66	−16	28.95
Coupe de France	10 February 2021	6 March 2021	Round of 64	Round of 32	2	1	0	1	2	4	−2	50.00
Total					40	12	8	20	52	70	−18	30.00

Last updated: 23 May 2021
Source: Soccerway

=== Ligue 1 ===
==== League table ====
Pos	Team	Pld	W	D	L	GF	GA	GD	Pts	Qualification or relegation
15	Strasbourg	38	11	9	18	49	58	−9	42	
16	Lorient	38	11	9	18	50	68	−18	42	
17	Brest	38	11	8	19	50	66	−16	41	
18	Nantes (O)	38	9	13	16	47	55	−8	40	Qualification for the Relegation play-offs
19	Nîmes (R)	38	9	8	21	40	71	−31	35	Relegation to the Ligue 2

Source: Ligue 1
Rules for classification: 1) Points; 2) Goal difference; 3) Goals scored; 4) Head-to-head goal difference; 5) Fairplay ranking.
(O) Play-off winners; (R) Relegated

==== Results summary ====
Overall								Home						Away					
Pld	W	D	L	GF	GA	GD	Pts	W	D	L	GF	GA	GD	W	D	L	GF	GA	GD
38	11	8	19	50	66	−16	41	8	4	7	32	33	−1	3	4	12	18	33	−15

Last updated: 23 May 2021.
Source: Ligue 1

==== Results by round ====
Round	1	2	3	4	5	6	7	8	9	10	11	12	13	14	15	16	17	18	19	20	21	22	23	24	25	26	27	28	29	30	31	32	33	34	35	36	37	38
Ground	A	H	A	H	A	H	A	H	A	H	H	A	A	H	A	H	A	H	A	H	A	H	A	H	A	H	A	H	A	H	A	H	H	A	H	A	A	H
Result	L	L	W	W	L	W	L	L	L	W	W	W	L	W	D	D	L	W	L	L	L	L	D	W	D	L	L	W	L	D	L	D	D	W	L	L	D	L
Position	20	20	16	9	13	11	13	14	14	13	13	10	12	10	10	11	11	10	11	12	13	13	13	12	12	12	14	13	14	14	16	16	15	13	14	14	16	17

Source: Ligue 1
A = Away; H = Home; W = Win; D = Draw; L = Loss

==== Matches ====
The league fixtures were announced on 9 July 2020.

23 August 2020 1	Nîmes	4–0	Brest	Nîmes
15:00 CEST (UTC+2)	Denkey 8'; Meling 31'; Deaux (yellow card) 37'; Benrahou (yellow card) 42'; Philippoteaux 69'; Koné 84'	Report	Faussurier (yellow card) 35'; Duverne (yellow card) 50'; Pierre-Gabriel (yellow card) 65'; Chardonnet (red card) 77'	Stadium: Stade des Costières; Referee: Jérémie Pignard

30 August 2020 2	Brest	2–3	Marseille	Brest
21:00 CEST (UTC+2)	Faivre 45+1'; Pierre-Gabriel (yellow card) 84'; Charbonnier 89'; Magnetti (yellow card) 90'	Report	Kamara (yellow card) 8'; Thauvin 20'; Ćaleta-Car 27', 80'; Amavi (yellow card) 30'; Radonjić (yellow card) 45+3'; Balerdi (yellow card) 61'	Stadium: Stade Francis-Le Blé; Referee: Amaury Delerue

13 September 2020 3	Dijon	0–2	Brest	Dijon
15:00 CEST (UTC+2)	Diop (yellow card) 20'; Assalé (red card) 55'; Ndong (yellow card) 56'	Report	Perraud 42'; Cardona 90+5'	Stadium: Stade Gaston Gérard; Referee: Bastien Dechepy

20 September 2020 4	Brest	3–2	Lorient	Brest
15:00 CEST (UTC+2)	Belkebla (yellow card) 4'; Perraud 30'; Mounié 32'; Honorat 62'; Mbock (yellow card) 73'	Report	Hérelle 34' (o.g.); Hamel (yellow card) 85'; Monconduit 90+1'	Stadium: Stade Francis-Le Blé; Referee: Karim Abed

27 September 2020 5	Angers	3–2	Brest	Angers
15:00 CEST (UTC+2)	Thioub 22'; Pavlović (yellow card) 39'; Mangani (yellow card) 43'; Traoré 78'; Fulgini 80'; Cho (yellow card) 90+2'	Report	Mounié 3' (pen.); Diallo (yellow card) 27'; Charbonnier 32'; Cardona (yellow card) 85'	Stadium: Stade Raymond Kopa; Referee: Jérémy Stinat

4 October 2020 6	Brest	1–0	Monaco	Brest
15:00 CEST (UTC+2)	Belkebla (yellow card) 7'; Faivre 8'; Mounié (yellow card) 68'; Lasne (yellow card) 77'	Report	Martins (yellow card) 37'; Volland (yellow card) 52'; Biancone (yellow card) 72'; Matsima (yellow card) 84'	Stadium: Stade Francis-Le Blé; Referee: Johan Hamel

18 October 2020 7	Nantes	3–1	Brest	Nantes
15:00 CEST (UTC+2)	Kolo 16'; Blas 30'; Abeid (yellow card) 38'; Fábio (yellow card) 47'; Pallois (yellow card) 67'; Bamba 79'	Report	Duverne (yellow card) 42'; Magnetti (yellow card) 60'; Faivre 68'	Stadium: Stade de la Beaujoire; Referee: Jérémie Pignard

25 October 2020 8	Brest	0–3	Strasbourg	Brest
15:00 CET (UTC+1)	Charbonnier (yellow card) 42'	Report	Ajorque (yellow card) 21', (goal) 67'; Diallo 26'; Lala 40' (pen.); Mitrović (yellow card) 41'; Aholou (yellow card) 80'	Stadium: Stade Francis-Le Blé; Referee: Jérôme Miguelgorry

31 October 2020 9	Rennes	2–1	Brest	Rennes
17:00 CET (UTC+1)	Dalbert (yellow card) 32'; Da Silva 66'; Aguerd 70'	Report	Honorat 57', (yellow card) 64'; Perraud (yellow card) 72'; Charbonnier (yellow card) 90+2'	Stadium: Roazhon Park; Attendance: 0 Referee: Stéphanie Frappart

8 November 2020 10	Brest	3–2	Lille	Brest
13:00 CET (UTC+1)	Pierre-Gabriel 15'; Perraud 19'; Cardona 42'; Chardonnet (yellow card) 52'; Mounié (yellow card) 56'; Larsonneur (yellow card) 87'; Faussurier (yellow card) 90'	Report	Yılmaz 45+3' (pen.), 57', (yellow card) 45+3'; Mandava (yellow card) 63'; Fonte (yellow card) 90+3'	Stadium: Stade Francis-Le Blé; Attendance: 0 Referee: Florent Batta

21 November 2020 11	Brest	4–1	Saint-Étienne	Brest
17:00 CET (UTC+1)	Honorat 7'; Duverne 23'; Brassier (yellow card) 30'; Cardona 33'; Mounié 38'	Report	Camara 31'; Trauco (yellow card) 55'	Stadium: Stade Francis-Le Blé; Attendance: 0 Referee: Thomas Léonard

29 November 2020 12	Metz	0–2	Brest	Metz
15:00 CET (UTC+1)	Oukidja (yellow card) 32'; Centonze (yellow card) 66'	Report	Cardona 12', 64', (yellow card) 54'	Stadium: Stade Saint-Symphorien; Attendance: 0 Referee: Hakim Ben El Hadj

6 December 2020 13	Bordeaux	1–0	Brest	Bordeaux
15:00 CET (UTC+1)	Ben Arfa 84'	Report	Pierre-Gabriel (yellow card) 43'; Duverne (yellow card) 60'; Belkebla (yellow card) 71'	Stadium: Matmut Atlantique; Attendance: 0 Referee: Frank Schneider

13 December 2020 14	Brest	2–1	Reims	Brest
15:00 CET (UTC+1)	Honorat 30'; Mounié (penalty missed) 36', 77'; Hérelle (yellow card) 50'	Report	Munetsi (yellow card) 51'; Zeneli 65'	Stadium: Stade Francis-Le Blé; Attendance: 0 Referee: Aurélien Petit

16 December 2020 15	Lyon	2–2	Brest	Décines-Charpieu
21:00 CET (UTC+1)	De Sciglio (yellow card) 15'; Depay 69' (pen.); Cornet 81'; Lopes (yellow card) 90'; Paquetá (yellow card) 90+6'	Report	Lopes 39' (o.g.); Lasne (red card) 74'; Faivre 90+2' (pen.)	Stadium: Parc Olympique Lyonnais; Attendance: 0 Referee: Jérôme Brisard

20 December 2020 16	Brest	2–2	Montpellier	Brest
13:00 CET (UTC+1)	Chardonnet (yellow card) 45+2', (goal) 79'; Hérelle (yellow card) 51'; Philippoteaux 58'	Report	Laborde 45+1'; Chotard (yellow card) 66'; Delort 82'	Stadium: Stade Francis-Le Blé; Attendance: 0 Referee: Benoît Millot

23 December 2020 17	Lens	2–1	Brest	Lens
19:00 CET (UTC+1)	Kalimuendo 11'; Sotoca 34' (pen.)	Report	Pierre-Gabriel (yellow card) 13'; Duverne (yellow card) 32'; Charbonnier 90+3' (pen.)	Stadium: Stade Bollaert-Delelis; Attendance: 0 Referee: Bastien Dechepy

6 January 2021 18	Brest	2–0	Nice	Brest
19:00 CET (UTC+1)	Mounié 23'; Honorat 28', (yellow card) 52'; Lasne (yellow card) 72'	Report	Saliba (yellow card) 11'; Gouiri (yellow card) 63'; Mahou (yellow card) 90+1'	Stadium: Stade Francis-Le Blé; Attendance: 0 Referee: Jérémy Stinat

9 January 2021 19	Paris Saint-Germain	3–0	Brest	Paris
21:00 CET (UTC+1)	Kean 16'; Verratti (yellow card) 62'; Icardi 81'; Sarabia 83'	Report	Lasne (yellow card) 76'	Stadium: Parc des Princes; Attendance: 0 Referee: Hakim Ben El Hadj

17 January 2021 20	Brest	1–2	Rennes	Brest
13:00 CET (UTC+1)	Honorat 4'; Hérelle (yellow card) 84'	Report	Bourigeaud 7', (yellow card) 56'; Grenier 77' (pen.)	Stadium: Stade Francis-Le Blé; Attendance: 0 Referee: Ruddy Buquet

24 January 2021 21	Reims	1–0	Brest	Reims
15:00 CET (UTC+1)	Mbuku 40'; Cafaro (yellow card) 70'; Faes (yellow card) 76'; Abdelhamid (yellow card) 83'	Report		Stadium: Stade Auguste-Delaune; Attendance: 0 Referee: Johan Hamel

31 January 2021 22	Brest	2–4	Metz	Brest
15:00 CET (UTC+1)	Perraud (yellow card) 31'; Honorat 33'; Cardona 48'	Report	Boulaya 36', (yellow card) 90+2'; Sarr 73'; Yade 81', (yellow card) 89'; Vagner 87' (pen.); Fofana (yellow card) 90+2'	Stadium: Stade Francis-Le Blé; Attendance: 0 Referee: Benoît Millot

3 February 2021 23	Strasbourg	2–2	Brest	Strasbourg
19:00 CET (UTC+1)	Thomasson 8'; Mitrović (yellow card) 48'; Aholou 70'; Kawashima (yellow card) 87'	Report	Charbonnier 83'; Le Douaron 90+3'	Stadium: Stade de la Meinau; Attendance: 0 Referee: Florent Batta

7 February 2021 24	Brest	2–1	Bordeaux	Brest
13:00 CET (UTC+1)	Mounié 80'; Faivre 85'; Honorat (yellow card) 90+3'	Report	Ben Arfa (yellow card) 6'; Koscielny (yellow card) 48'; Bašić (yellow card) 51'; Hwang 56'	Stadium: Stade Francis-Le Blé; Attendance: 0 Referee: Eric Wattellier

14 February 2021 25	Lille	0–0	Brest	Villeneuve-d'Ascq
17:00 CET (UTC+1)	Çelik (yellow card) 44'; Bamba (yellow card) 75'	Report	Belkebla (yellow card) 7'	Stadium: Stade Pierre-Mauroy; Attendance: 0 Referee: Bastien Dechepy

19 February 2021 26	Brest	2–3	Lyon	Brest
21:00 CET (UTC+1)	Belkebla (yellow card) 40'; Chardonnet 53'; Cardona 74'	Report	Paquetá 9', (yellow card) 90+5'; Aouar 29'; Depay 44' (pen.); De Sciglio (yellow card) 56'	Stadium: Stade Francis-Le Blé; Attendance: 0 Referee: Frank Schneider

28 February 2021 27	Monaco	2–0	Brest	Monaco
13:00 CET (UTC+1)	Maripán (yellow card) 28'; Ben Yedder (penalty missed) 30'; Jovetić 76'; Diatta (yellow card) 85'; Volland 90'	Report		Stadium: Stade Louis II; Attendance: 0 Referee: Jérémie Pignard

3 March 2021 28	Brest	3–1	Dijon	Brest
19:00 CET (UTC+1)	Honorat 17'; Brassier (yellow card) 22'; Mounié 27'; Perraud (yellow card) 28'; Cardona 40'; Charbonnier (yellow card) 61'	Report	Assalé 29'; Dina Ebimbe (yellow card) 84'	Stadium: Stade Francis-Le Blé; Attendance: 0 Referee: Jérémy Stinat

13 March 2021 29	Marseille	3–1	Brest	Marseille
17:00 CET (UTC+1)	Ćaleta-Car (yellow card) 21'; Álvaro (yellow card) 23'; Thauvin (yellow card) 38', (goal) 88'; Milik 45+1'; Cuisance 90+3'	Report	Mounié (yellow card) 55'; Brassier 71'	Stadium: Stade Vélodrome; Attendance: 0 Referee: Jérôme Miguelgorry

21 March 2021 30	Brest	0–0	Angers	Brest
15:00 CET (UTC+1)	Lasne (yellow card) 46'	Report	Doumbia (yellow card) 24'; Amadou (yellow card) 47'; Boufal (yellow card) 84'	Stadium: Stade Francis-Le Blé; Attendance: 0 Referee: Aurélien Petit

4 April 2021 31	Lorient	1–0	Brest	Lorient
15:00 CEST (UTC+2)	Abergel (yellow card) 20', (goal) 45'; Monconduit (yellow card) 78'; Hamel (yellow card) 88'	Report	Mounié (yellow card) 52'; Brassier (yellow card) 85'; Belkebla (red card) 90+3'	Stadium: Stade du Moustoir; Attendance: 0 Referee: Bastien Dechepy

11 April 2021 32	Brest	1–1	Nîmes	Brest
15:00 CEST (UTC+2)	Chardonnet 26'; Mounié (yellow card) 46'; Perraud (yellow card) 47'; Magnetti (yellow card) 50'; Jean Lucas (yellow card) 86'	Report	Koné 11'; Fomba (yellow card) 22'	Stadium: Stade Francis-Le Blé; Attendance: 0 Referee: Willy Delajod

18 April 2021 33	Brest	1–1	Lens	Brest
15:00 CEST (UTC+2)	Cahuzac 36' (o.g.); Jean Lucas (yellow card) 87' (yellow-red card) 89'	Report	Badé (yellow card) 35'; Haïdara (yellow card) 38'; Fortès (yellow card) 54' (yellow-red card) 81'; Banza (yellow card) 59' (yellow-red card) 89'; Clauss (yellow card) 63'; Kakuta 72' (pen.)	Stadium: Stade Francis-Le Blé; Attendance: 0 Referee: Karim Abed

24 April 2021 34	Saint-Étienne	1–2	Brest	Saint-Étienne
13:00 CEST (UTC+2)	Khazri 11'; Youssouf (yellow card) 66'; Camara (yellow card) 90+1'	Report	Charbonnier 67', 79'; Belkebla (yellow card) 77'	Stadium: Stade Geoffroy-Guichard; Attendance: 0 Referee: Florent Batta

2 May 2021 35	Brest	1–4	Nantes	Brest
15:00 CEST (UTC+2)	Larsonneur (yellow card) 61'; Faivre 83'; Charbonnier (yellow card) 89'	Report	Simon 15'; Blas 27'; Louza 56'; Coulibaly 62' (pen.)	Stadium: Stade Francis-Le Blé; Attendance: 0 Referee: Mikael Lesage

9 May 2021 36	Nice	3–2	Brest	Nice
15:00 CEST (UTC+2)	Lopes 38'; Lees-Melou (red card) 52'; Boudaoui 60'; Todibo (yellow card) 70'; Kamara 89'	Report	Mounié 4', 43'; Jean Lucas (yellow card) 64'	Stadium: Allianz Riviera; Attendance: 0 Referee: Thomas Léonard

16 May 2021 37	Montpellier	0–0	Brest	Montpellier
21:00 CEST (UTC+2)	Mollet (red card) 39'	Report	Mounié (yellow card) 42'; Belkebla (yellow card) 50'; Chardonnet (yellow card) 72'	Stadium: Stade de la Mosson; Attendance: 0 Referee: Aurélien Petit

23 May 2021 38	Brest	0–2	Paris Saint-Germain	Brest
21:00 CEST (UTC+2)	Magnetti (yellow card) 35'	Report	Neymar (penalty missed) 19', (yellow card) 33'; Herrera (yellow card) 27'; Faivre 37' (o.g.); Mbappé 71'	Stadium: Stade Francis-Le Blé; Attendance: 0 Referee: Mikael Lesage

=== Coupe de France ===
10 February 2021 Round of 64	Brest	2–1	Rodez	Brest
17:00 CET (UTC+1)	Mounié 34'; Le Douaron 36'; Magnetti (yellow card) 58'; Mbock (yellow card) 84'	Report	Dembélé 16'	Stadium: Stade Francis-Le Blé; Attendance: 0 Referee: Aurélien Petit

6 March 2021 Round of 32	Brest	0–3	Paris Saint-Germain	Brest
21:10 CET (UTC+1)		Report	Mbappé 9', 73'; Paredes (yellow card) 27'; Sarabia 44'; Herrera (yellow card) 69'	Stadium: Stade Francis-Le Blé; Attendance: 0 Referee: Jérôme Brisard

== Statistics ==
=== Goalscorers ===
As of 18 October 2020

Rank	No.	Pos	Nat	Name	Ligue 1	Coupe de France	Total
1	21	MF	(France)	Romain Faivre	3	0	3
2	18	DF	(France)	Romain Perraud	2	0	2
2	10	FW	(France)	Gaëtan Charbonnier	2	0	2
2	15	FW	(Benin)	Steve Mounié	2	0	2
3	9	FW	(France)	Franck Honorat	1	0	1
3	14	FW	(France)	Irvin Cardona	1	0	1
Totals					11	0	11
