= 2022–23 Stade Brestois 29 season =

Stade Brestois 29
2022–23 season
- President: Denis Le Saint
- Head coach: Michel Der Zakarian (until 11 October); Bruno Grougi (caretaker, from 11 October); Éric Roy (from 3 January)
- Stadium: Stade Francis-Le Blé
- Ligue 1: 14th
- Coupe de France: Round of 32
- Top goalscorer: League: Jérémy Le Douaron (10); All: Jérémy Le Douaron (10)
- Biggest win: Brest 4–0 Angers
- Biggest defeat: Brest 0–7 Montpellier
Home colours	Away colours	Third colours

The 2022–23 season was the 73rd season in the history of Stade Brestois 29 and their fourth consecutive season in the top flight. The club participated in Ligue 1 and the Coupe de France. The season covers the period from 1 July 2022 to 30 June 2023.

== Players ==
=== First-team squad ===
As of 1 February 2023

Note: Flags indicate national team as defined under FIFA eligibility rules; some limited exceptions apply. Players may hold more than one non-FIFA nationality.

No.	Pos.	Nation	Player
1	GK	ARG	Joaquín Blázquez (on loan from Talleres)
2	DF	FRA	Jean-Kévin Duverne
3	DF	FRA	Lilian Brassier
4	DF	MAR	Achraf Dari
5	DF	FRA	Brendan Chardonnet (vice-captain)
7	MF	ALG	Haris Belkebla
8	MF	FRA	Hugo Magnetti
9	FW	FRA	Franck Honorat
10	FW	FRA	Romain Del Castillo
11	FW	FRA	Axel Camblan
15	FW	BEN	Steve Mounié
17	FW	HON	Alberth Elis (on loan from Bordeaux)
18	FW	ENG	Karamoko Dembélé

No.	Pos.	Nation	Player
20	MF	FRA	Pierre Lees-Melou (captain)
22	FW	FRA	Jérémy Le Douaron
23	DF	FRA	Christophe Hérelle
27	DF	FRA	Kenny Lala
29	MF	POR	Mathias Pereira Lage
30	GK	FRA	Grégoire Coudert
37	MF	FRA	Félix Lemaréchal (on loan from Monaco)
40	GK	NED	Marco Bizot
45	MF	FRA	Mahdi Camara (on loan from Saint-Étienne)
97	FW	FRA	Taïryk Arconte
99	DF	BEL	Noah Fadiga
—	DF	FRA	Bradley Locko (on loan from Reims)

=== Out on loan ===
Note: Flags indicate national team as defined under FIFA eligibility rules; some limited exceptions apply. Players may hold more than one non-FIFA nationality.

No. / Pos. / Nation / Player; — / DF / FIN / Jere Uronen (at Schalke 04 until 30 June 2023)	No. / Pos. / Nation / Player; — / MF / FRA / Hiang'a Mbock (at Caen until 30 June 2023)

== Transfers ==
=== In ===
Pos.	Player	Transferred from	Fee	Date	Source
MF	(France) Pierre Lees-Melou	(England) Norwich City	€2.3 million	23 July 2022	
GK	(Argentina) Joaquín Blázquez	(Argentina) Talleres	Loan	27 July 2022	
DF	(Morocco) Achraf Dari	(Morocco) Wydad AC	€2.7 million	30 July 2022	
FW	(Algeria) Islam Slimani	Unattached	Free	25 August 2022	
MF	(France) Mahdi Camara	(France) Saint-Étienne	Loan (Note: Includes an option to sign permanently for €3.5 million.)	26 August 2022	

=== Out ===
Pos.	Player	Transferred from	Fee	Date	Source
MF	(Algeria) Youcef Belaïli	Released (Note: On 12 October 2022, Belaïli joined Ajaccio.)	Free	29 September 2022	
DF	(Finland) Jere Uronen	(Germany) Schalke 04	Loan	7 January 2023	
MF	(France) Irvin Cardona	(Germany) FC Augsburg	€500,000	18 January 2023	

== Pre-season and friendlies ==
Win Draw Loss Fixtures

9 July 2022 Friendly	Brest (France)	1–0	(France) Avranches	Gouesnou
18:00 CEST (UTC+2)	Cardona 35'			Stadium: Stade du Crann

16 July 2022 Friendly	Brest (France)	1–0	(France) Lorient	Dinan
17:30 CEST (UTC+2)	Dembélé 90'			Stadium: Stade du Clos Gastel

20 July 2022 Friendly	Angers (France)	0–2	(France) Brest	Dinan
19:00 CEST (UTC+2)			Dembélé 37'; Belaïli 77'	Stadium: Stade du Clos Gastel

23 July 2022 Friendly	Guingamp (France)	2–0	(France) Brest	Guingamp
17:00 CEST (UTC+2)	Guillaume 54', 66'			Stadium: Stade du Roudourou

30 July 2022 Friendly	Brest (France)	0–0	(Spain) Valladolid	Brest
18:00 CEST (UTC+2)				Stadium: Stade Francis-Le Blé

13 December 2022 Friendly	Osasuna (Spain)	3–0	(France) Brest	Palamós, Spain
12:00 CET (UTC+1)				Stadium: Estadi Palamós Costa Brava

== Competitions ==
=== Overall record ===
Competition	First match	Last match	Starting round	Final position	Record							
Competition	First match	Last match	Starting round	Final position	Pld	W	D	L	GF	GA	GD	Win %
Ligue 1	7 August 2022	3 June 2023	Matchday 1	14th	38	11	11	16	44	54	−10	28.95
Coupe de France	7 January 2023	22 January 2023	Round of 64	Round of 32	2	1	0	1	3	3	+0	50.00
Total					40	12	11	17	47	57	−10	30.00

Source: Soccerway

=== Ligue 1 ===
==== League table ====
Pos	Team	Pld	W	D	L	GF	GA	GD	Pts	Qualification or relegation
12	Montpellier	38	15	5	18	65	62	+3	50	
13	Toulouse	38	13	9	16	51	57	−6	48	Qualification for the Europa League group stage (Note: Toulouse qualified for the Europa League group stage as the 2022–23 Coupe de France winners.)
14	Brest	38	11	11	16	44	54	−10	44	
15	Strasbourg	38	9	13	16	51	59	−8	40	
16	Nantes	38	7	15	16	37	55	−18	36	

Source: Ligue 1
Rules for classification: 1) Points; 2) Goal difference; 3) Head-to-head points; 4) Head-to-head goal difference; 5) Head-to-head goals scored; 6) Head-to-head away goals scored; 7) Goals scored; 8) Away goals scored; 9) Fair-play points (Note: Head-to-head record is used only after all the matches between the teams in question have been played).

==== Results summary ====
Overall								Home						Away					
Pld	W	D	L	GF	GA	GD	Pts	W	D	L	GF	GA	GD	W	D	L	GF	GA	GD
38	11	11	16	44	54	−10	44	7	5	7	24	26	−2	4	6	9	20	28	−8

Source: Ligue 1

==== Results by round ====
Round	1	2	3	4	5	6	7	8	9	10	11	12	13	14	15	16	17	18	19	20	21	22	23	24	25	26	27	28	29	30	31	32	33	34	35	36	37	38
Ground	A	H	A	H	A	H	A	H	A	H	A	A	H	A	H	H	A	H	A	H	A	H	A	H	A	A	H	A	H	A	H	A	H	A	H	H	A	H
Result	L	D	W	L	L	D	L	L	D	L	L	W	D	L	W	L	L	D	D	W	D	D	L	L	L	W	L	D	W	D	W	D	W	L	W	W	W	L
Position	14	14	7	14	17	17	18	19	18	20	20	17	18	19	16	17	17	17	17	16	15	14	15	16	18	15	16	16	15	16	16	17	14	15	15	14	14	14

Source: Ligue 1
A = Away; H = Home; W = Win; D = Draw; L = Loss

==== Matches ====
The league fixtures were announced on 17 June 2022.

7 August 2022 1	Lens	3–2	Brest	Lens
15:00 CEST (UTC+2)	Sotoca 26', 61', 64'; Costa (yellow card) 37'; Danso (yellow card) 77'	Report	Lees-Melou (yellow card) 30'; Belaïli (yellow card) 42'; Brassier (yellow card) 61'; Belkebla 65'; Chardonnet (yellow card) 70'; Del Castillo 81' (pen.)	Stadium: Stade Bollaert-Delelis; Attendance: 37,015; Referee: Thomas Léonard

14 August 2022 2	Brest	1–1	Marseille	Brest
20:45 CEST (UTC+2)	Belaïli (yellow card) 51'; Lees-Melou 61'	Report	Milik (yellow card) 18'; Tavares 38'; Gerson (yellow card) 57'; Rongier (yellow card) 65'; Guendouzi (yellow card) 73'	Stadium: Stade Francis-Le Blé; Attendance: 13,709; Referee: Jérémy Stinat

21 August 2022 3	Angers	1–3	Brest	Angers
15:00 CEST (UTC+2)	Šabanović (red card) 34'; Thioub (yellow card) 47'; Diony (yellow card) 49'; Boufal 70'	Report	Le Douaron 10', 38'; Dari 65'	Stadium: Stade Raymond Kopa; Attendance: 8,735; Referee: Jérôme Brisard

28 August 2022 4	Brest	0–7	Montpellier	Brest
15:00 CEST (UTC+2)	Lees-Melou (red card) 50'	Report	Maouassa 6'; Wahi 10', 31'; Khazri 11'; Cozza 25'; Nordin (yellow card) 62'; Germain 64', 84'; Leroy (yellow card) 71'	Stadium: Stade Francis-Le Blé; Attendance: 11,546; Referee: Marc Bollengier

31 August 2022 5	Rennes	3–1	Brest	Rennes
21:00 CEST (UTC+2)	Rodon 53'; Assignon (yellow card) 61'; Tait (yellow card) 86'; Terrier 89'; Doué 90+1'	Report	Honorat 57'	Stadium: Roazhon Park; Attendance: 27,392; Referee: Benoît Millot

4 September 2022 6	Brest	1–1	Strasbourg	Brest
15:00 CEST (UTC+2)	Lees-Melou 6'; Brassier (yellow card) 44'; Belkebla (yellow card) 52'; Belaïli (yellow card) 64'	Report	Ajorque 28' (pen.); Prcić (red card) 31'; Pierre-Gabriel (yellow card) 79'	Stadium: Stade Francis-Le Blé; Attendance: 11,003; Referee: Bastien Dechepy

10 September 2022 7	Paris Saint-Germain	1–0	Brest	Paris
17:00 CEST (UTC+2)	Neymar 30', (yellow card) 40'; Kimpembe (yellow card) 69'; Pereira (yellow card) 77'; Mendes (yellow card) 80'	Report	Lees-Melou (yellow card) 25'; Chardonnet (yellow card) 46'; Slimani (penalty missed) 70'	Stadium: Parc des Princes; Attendance: 45,000; Referee: Jérémie Pignard

18 September 2022 8	Brest	0–1	Ajaccio	Brest
15:00 CEST (UTC+2)	Duverne (yellow card) 42'; Dari (yellow card) 64'	Report	Diallo (yellow card) 30'; Hamouma (yellow card) 45+1', (goal) 65'	Stadium: Stade Francis-Le Blé; Attendance: 11,153; Referee: Stéphanie Frappart

2 October 2022 9	Auxerre	1–1	Brest	Auxerre
15:00 CEST (UTC+2)	Sakhi (yellow card) 4'; Jeanvier (yellow card) 5' (yellow-red card) 52'; Niang (yellow card) 59', (goal) 86' (pen.)	Report	Slimani (yellow card) 25', (goal) 64'; Chardonnet (yellow card) 57'; Del Castillo (yellow card) 82'; Bizot (yellow card) 85'	Stadium: Stade de l'Abbé-Deschamps; Attendance: 14,630; Referee: Florent Batta

9 October 2022 10	Brest	1–2	Lorient	Brest
15:00 CEST (UTC+2)	Del Castillo 17', (yellow card) 63'; Slimani (yellow card) 21'; Honorat (yellow card) 66'	Report	Moffi 24', 53'; Boisgard (yellow card) 68'	Stadium: Stade Francis-Le Blé; Attendance: 9,819; Referee: Bastien Dechepy

16 October 2022 11	Nantes	4–1	Brest	Nantes
15:00 CEST (UTC+2)	Blas (penalty missed) 12'; Simon 35' (pen.); Ganago 36'; Mohamed 71'; Sissoko 88'	Report	Fadiga 18'; Lees-Melou (yellow card) 33'; Pereira Lage (yellow card) 40'	Stadium: Stade de la Beaujoire; Attendance: 25,759; Referee: Marc Bollengier

23 October 2022 12	Clermont	1–3	Brest	Clermont-Ferrand
15:00 CEST (UTC+2)	Seidu (yellow card) 37'; Magnin (yellow card) 41'; Caufriez (yellow card) 61'; Allevinah 89'; Wieteska (yellow card) 90+2'	Report	Del Castillo 15' (pen.); Slimani (yellow card) 37'; Honorat 55'; Le Douaron 68'	Stadium: Stade Gabriel Montpied; Attendance: 7,275; Referee: Jérémie Pignard

30 October 2022 13	Brest	0–0	Reims	Brest
15:00 CET (UTC+1)	Slimani (yellow card) 73'	Report	Flips (yellow card) 55'	Stadium: Stade Francis-Le Blé; Attendance: 11,008; Referee: Willy Delajod

6 November 2022 14	Nice	1–0	Brest	Nice
15:00 CET (UTC+1)	Laborde 54'; Boudaoui (yellow card) 90+1'	Report	Le Douaron (yellow card) 59'	Stadium: Allianz Riviera; Attendance: 19,035; Referee: Jérémy Stinat

13 November 2022 15	Brest	2–1	Troyes	Brest
15:00 CET (UTC+1)	Del Castillo 55'; Mounié 77'; Hérelle (yellow card) 80'; Chardonnet (yellow card) 86'; Bizot (yellow card) 89'	Report	Kouamé (yellow card) 34'; Lopes (yellow card) 36'; Chardonnet 60' (o.g.); M. Baldé (red card) 80'	Stadium: Stade Francis-Le Blé; Attendance: 10,642; Referee: Ruddy Buquet

28 December 2022 16	Brest	2–4	Lyon	Brest
21:00 CET (UTC+1)	Pereira Lage 28'; Chardonnet (yellow card) 33'; Camara (yellow card) 37'; Mounié 71'	Report	Caqueret 20', (yellow card) 43'; Cherki (yellow card) 30', (goal) 31'; Lacazette 34' (pen.); Tetê 48'	Stadium: Stade Francis-Le Blé; Attendance: 14,601; Referee: Bastien Dechepy

1 January 2023 17	Monaco	1–0	Brest	Monaco
15:00 CET (UTC+1)	Ben Seghir (yellow card) 40'; Golovin 55', (yellow card) 77'; Sarr (yellow card) 90+5'	Report	Fadiga (yellow card) 25'; Slimani (yellow card) 69'; Pereira Lage (yellow card) 76'; Lees-Melou (yellow card) 77'	Stadium: Stade Louis II; Attendance: 6,150; Referee: Jérémy Stinat

11 January 2023 18	Brest	0–0	Lille	Brest
19:00 CET (UTC+1)		Report	Cabella (yellow card) 90'	Stadium: Stade Francis-Le Blé; Attendance: 11,452; Referee: Mathieu Vernice

15 January 2023 19	Toulouse	1–1	Brest	Toulouse
15:00 CET (UTC+1)	Dejaegere (yellow card) 42'; Rouault (yellow card) 57'; Aboukhlal 65'	Report	Mounié 18'; Brassier (yellow card) 37'; Lees-Melou (yellow card) 38'	Stadium: Stadium de Toulouse; Attendance: 20,637; Referee: Benoît Millot

29 January 2023 20	Brest	4–0	Angers	Brest
15:00 CET (UTC+1)	Le Douaron 14'; Mounié 34'; Honorat 59'; Lees-Melou 84'	Report	Bentaleb (yellow card) 18'; Mendy (yellow card) 49'	Stadium: Stade Francis-Le Blé; Attendance: 12,629; Referee: Marc Bollengier

1 February 2023 21	Lyon	0–0	Brest	Décines-Charpieu
21:00 CET (UTC+1)		Report		Stadium: Parc Olympique Lyonnais; Attendance: 30,837; Referee: Ruddy Buquet

5 February 2023 22	Brest	1–1	Lens	Brest
17:05 CET (UTC+1)	Camara (yellow card) 25'; Hérelle (yellow card) 29'; Lees-Melou (yellow card) 38'; Le Douaron 54'; Bizot (yellow card) 79'	Report	Medina (yellow card) 25'; Fofana (yellow card) 73'; Gradit 83'	Stadium: Stade Francis-Le Blé; Attendance: 11,639; Referee: Benoît Bastien

12 February 2023 23	Montpellier	3–0	Brest	Montpellier
15:00 CET (UTC+1)	Hérelle 4' (o.g.); Savanier 17' (pen.); Leroy (yellow card) 45+4'; Wahi 54'	Report	Lemaréchal (yellow card) 74'; Lala (yellow card) 80'	Stadium: Stade de la Mosson; Attendance: 12,901; Referee: Florent Batta

19 February 2023 24	Brest	1–2	Monaco	Brest
15:00 CET (UTC+1)	Belkebla (yellow card) 42'; Le Douaron 86'	Report	Golovin 39'; Ben Yedder (yellow card) 66'; Boadu 73'; Jakobs (yellow card) 90+5'	Stadium: Stade Francis-Le Blé; Attendance: 13,203; Referee: Hakim Ben El Hadj

24 February 2023 25	Lille	2–1	Brest	Villeneuve-d'Ascq
21:00 CET (UTC+1)	Diakité 60'; Djaló (yellow card) 61'; Alexsandro 80'; Cabella (yellow card) 90+4'	Report	Djaló 8' (o.g.); Brassier (yellow card) 62'; Camara (red card) 90+6'	Stadium: Stade Pierre-Mauroy; Attendance: 30,257; Referee: Pierre Gaillouste

5 March 2023 26	Strasbourg	0–1	Brest	Strasbourg
15:00 CET (UTC+1)	Guilbert (yellow card) 43'; Doukouré (yellow card) 66'	Report	Honorat 45+2'; Bizot (yellow card) 90+6'	Stadium: Stade de la Meinau; Attendance: 25,123; Referee: Ruddy Buquet

11 March 2023 27	Brest	1–2	Paris Saint-Germain	Brest
21:00 CET (UTC+1)	Honorat 43'; Belkebla (yellow card) 86'	Report	Soler 37'; Mbappé (yellow card) 86', (goal) 90'	Stadium: Stade Francis-Le Blé; Attendance: 14,935; Referee: Marc Bollengier

19 March 2023 28	Troyes	2–2	Brest	Troyes
15:00 CET (UTC+1)	Ripart 34', (yellow card) 45+1'; Lopes 38'	Report	Lees-Melou 30'; Del Castillo 74'	Stadium: Stade de l'Aube; Attendance: 9,012; Referee: Florent Batta

2 April 2023 29	Brest	3–1	Toulouse	Brest
15:00 CEST (UTC+2)	Lala (yellow card) 4'; Lees-Melou (yellow card) 30'; Mounié 33'; Le Douaron 63'; Camara 84'	Report	Dallinga 10'; Desler (yellow card) 25'; Spierings (yellow card) 30'; Aboukhlal (yellow card) 60'; Rouault (yellow card) 75' (yellow-red card) 83'	Stadium: Stade Francis-Le Blé; Attendance: 12,325; Referee: Stéphanie Frappart

9 April 2023 30	Reims	1–1	Brest	Reims
15:00 CEST (UTC+2)	Balogun 90+1' (pen.)	Report	Lees-Melou 5'; Lala (yellow card) 89'	Stadium: Stade Auguste Delaune; Attendance: 12,023; Referee: Benoît Millot

16 April 2023 31	Brest	1–0	Nice	Brest
15:00 CEST (UTC+2)	Le Douaron 12'; Magnetti (yellow card) 58'	Report	Amraoui (yellow card) 20'; Boudaoui (yellow card) 76'; Bryan (yellow card) 85'	Stadium: Stade Francis-Le Blé; Attendance: 12,615; Referee: Benoît Bastien

23 April 2023 32	Ajaccio	0–0	Brest	Ajaccio
15:00 CEST (UTC+2)	Diallo (yellow card) 27'; Touzghar (red card) 66'; El Idrissy (yellow card) 68'	Report	Mounié (yellow card) 29'; Camara (yellow card) 34'	Stadium: Stade François Coty; Attendance: 6,879; Referee: Jérémy Stinat

3 May 2023 33	Brest	2–0	Nantes	Brest
21:00 CEST (UTC+2)	Le Douaron 17'; Pereira Lage 34'	Report	Moutoussamy (yellow card) 84'	Stadium: Stade Francis-Le Blé; Attendance: 14,470; Referee: Willy Delajod

7 May 2023 34	Lorient	2–1	Brest	Lorient
15:00 CEST (UTC+2)	Koné 32', 51'; Yongwa (yellow card) 83'; Makengo (yellow card) 89' (yellow-red card) 90+5'	Report	Duverne (yellow card) 42'; Lees-Melou (yellow card) 60'; Del Castillo 69' (pen.)	Stadium: Stade du Moustoir; Attendance: 16,338; Referee: Benoît Millot

14 May 2023 35	Brest	1–0	Auxerre	Brest
15:00 CEST (UTC+2)	Le Douaron 69'	Report		Stadium: Stade Francis-Le Blé; Attendance: 15,028; Referee: Eric Wattelier

21 May 2023 36	Brest	2–1	Clermont	Brest
15:00 CEST (UTC+2)	Honorat 45'; Mounié 48'; Camara (yellow card) 90+1'; Brassier (yellow card) 90+2'	Report	Borges 43'; Seidu (yellow card) 57'; Gastien (yellow card) 90+1'; Caufriez (yellow card) 90+2'; Wieteska (yellow card) 90+4'	Stadium: Stade Francis-Le Blé; Attendance: 13,751; Referee: Bastien Dechepy

27 May 2023 37	Marseille	1–2	Brest	Marseille
21:00 CEST (UTC+2)	Veretout (yellow card) 63'; Mbemba 75'; Balerdi (yellow card) 87'; Lala (yellow card) 90+2'	Report	Magnetti 57'; Chardonnet (yellow card) 67'; Camara 81'	Stadium: Stade Vélodrome; Attendance: 61,732; Referee: Stéphanie Frappart

3 June 2023 38	Brest	1–2	Rennes	Brest
21:00 CEST (UTC+2)	Belkebla 36' (pen.); Magnetti (yellow card) 42'; Lees-Melou (yellow card) 45+2'; Lemaréchal (yellow card) 90+4'	Report	Bourigeaud 14', 45+4' (pen.), (yellow card) 85'; Meling (yellow card) 83'; Alemdar (yellow card) 90+4'	Stadium: Stade Francis-Le Blé; Attendance: 15,143; Referee: Jérôme Brisard

=== Coupe de France ===
7 January 2023 Round of 64	US Avranches	0–2	Brest	Avranches
15:30 CET (UTC+1)		Report	Lees-Melou 73'; Camblan 90+3'	Stadium: Stade René Fenouillère; Attendance: 3,616; Referee: Eric Wattellier

23 January 2023 Round of 32	Brest	1–3	Lens	Brest
21:00 CET (UTC+1)	Slimani 19'; Lees-Melou (yellow card) 31'	Report	Saïd 5'; Medina 30'; Thomasson 37'	Stadium: Stade Francis-Le Blé; Attendance: 7,000; Referee: Pierre Gaillouste

== Statistics ==
=== Appearances and goals ===
Last updated 3 June 2023.

No.	Pos	Nat	Player	Total		Ligue 1		Coupe de France	
No.	Pos	Nat	Player	Apps	Goals	Apps	Goals	Apps	Goals
Goalkeepers
1	GK	(Argentina) ARG	Joaquín Blázquez	3	0	1+0	0	2+0	0
30	GK	(France) FRA	Grégoire Coudert	0	0	0	0	0	0
40	GK	(Netherlands) NED	Marco Bizot	37	0	37+0	0	0	0
Defenders
2	DF	(France) FRA	Jean-Kévin Duverne	36	0	27+7	0	2+0	0
3	DF	(France) FRA	Lilian Brassier	38	0	35+1	0	2+0	0
4	DF	(Morocco) MAR	Achraf Dari	20	1	16+2	1	2+0	0
5	DF	(France) FRA	Brendan Chardonnet	30	0	27+3	0	0	0
23	DF	(France) FRA	Christophe Hérelle	16	0	12+4	0	0	0
27	DF	(France) FRA	Kenny Lala	19	0	16+1	0	2+0	0
28	MF	(France) FRA	Bradley Locko	7	0	2+5	0	0	0
99	DF	(Belgium) BEL	Noah Fadiga	22	1	16+5	1	0+1	0
Midfielders
7	MF	(Algeria) ALG	Haris Belkebla	40	2	31+7	2	2+0	0
8	MF	(France) FRA	Hugo Magnetti	34	1	19+13	1	2+0	0
20	MF	(France) FRA	Pierre Lees-Melou	34	6	32+0	5	2+0	1
29	MF	(Portugal) POR	Mathias Pereira Lage	24	2	16+8	2	0	0
37	MF	(France) FRA	Félix Lemaréchal	13	0	2+11	0	0	0
45	MF	(France) FRA	Mahdi Camara	32	2	19+11	2	0+2	0
Forwards
9	FW	(France) FRA	Franck Honorat	35	6	29+4	6	1+1	0
10	FW	(France) FRA	Romain Del Castillo	27	6	16+11	6	0	0
15	FW	(Benin) BEN	Steve Mounié	26	6	20+4	6	1+1	0
17	FW	(Honduras) HON	Alberth Elis	10	0	3+7	0	0	0
18	FW	(England) ENG	Karamoko Dembélé	17	0	0+15	0	1+1	0
22	FW	(France) FRA	Jérémy Le Douaron	34	10	24+8	10	1+1	0
97	FW	(France) FRA	Taïryk Arconte	5	0	1+3	0	0+1	0
Players transferred out during the season
21	DF	(Finland) FIN	Jere Uronen	6	0	3+3	0	0	0
28	MF	(France) FRA	Hiang'a Mbock	2	0	0+2	0	0	0
13	FW	(Algeria) ALG	Islam Slimani	18	2	11+5	1	2+0	1
14	FW	(France) FRA	Irvin Cardona	10	0	1+9	0	0	0
19	FW	(Comoros) COM	Rafiki Saïd	0	0	0	0	0	0
31	FW	(Algeria) ALG	Youcef Belaïli	6	0	4+2	0	0	0
33	FW	(France) FRA	Axel Camblan	9	1	0+7	0	0+2	1

=== Top scorers ===
Includes all competitive matches. The list is sorted by squad number when total goals are equal.

Last updated 3 June 2023.

Rank	Position	Nationality	No.	Player	Ligue 1	Coupe de France	Total
1	FW	(France)	26	Jérémy Le Douaron	10	0	10
2	MF	(France)	20	Pierre Lees-Melou	5	1	6
2	FW	(France)	10	Romain Del Castillo	6	0	6
2	FW	(France)	9	Franck Honorat	6	0	6
2	FW	(Benin)	15	Steve Mounié	6	0	6
6	MF	(Algeria)	7	Haris Belkebla	2	0	2
6	MF	(Portugal)	29	Mathias Pereira Lage	2	0	2
6	MF	(France)	45	Mahdi Camara	2	0	2
6	FW	(Algeria)	13	Islam Slimani	1	1	2
10	DF	(Morocco)	4	Achraf Dari	1	0	1
10	DF	(Belgium)	99	Noah Fadiga	1	0	1
10	MF	(France)	8	Hugo Magnetti	1	0	1
10	FW	(France)	33	Axel Camblan	0	1	1
	Own goals				1	0	1
	TOTALS				44	3	47

=== Cleansheets ===
Includes all competitive matches. The list is sorted by squad number when total cleansheets are equal.

Last updated 3 June 2023.

Rank	Position	Nationality	No.	Player	Ligue 1	Coupe de France	Total
1
1	GK	(Netherlands)	40	Marco Bizot	7	0	7
2
2	GK	(Argentina)	1	Joaquín Blázquez	1	1	2
TOTALS					8	1	9

=== Disciplinary record ===
Includes all competitive matches.

Last updated 3 June 2023.

Position	Nationality	Number	Name	Ligue 1			Coupe de France			Total		
Position	Nationality	Number	Name	Yellow card	(yellow card) (yellow-red card)	Red card	Yellow card	(yellow card) (yellow-red card)	Red card	Yellow card	(yellow card) (yellow-red card)	Red card
MF	(France)	20	Pierre Lees-Melou	10	0	1	1	0	0	11	0	1
DF	(France)	5	Brendan Chardonnet	6	0	0	0	0	0	6	0	0
DF	(France)	3	Lilian Brassier	5	0	0	0	0	0	5	0	0
FW	(Algeria)	13	Islam Slimani	5	0	0	0	0	0	5	0	0
GK	(Netherlands)	40	Marco Bizot	4	0	0	0	0	0	4	0	0
DF	(France)	27	Kenny Lala	4	0	0	0	0	0	4	0	0
MF	(France)	45	Mahdi Camara	4	0	0	0	0	0	4	0	0
MF	(Algeria)	7	Haris Belkebla	3	0	0	0	0	0	3	0	0
FW	(Algeria)	31	Youcef Belaïli	3	0	0	0	0	0	3	0	0
DF	(France)	2	Jean-Kévin Duverne	2	0	0	0	0	0	2	0	0
DF	(France)	23	Christophe Hérelle	2	0	0	0	0	0	2	0	0
DF	(Belgium)	99	Noah Fadiga	2	0	0	0	0	0	2	0	0
MF	(France)	8	Hugo Magnetti	2	0	0	0	0	0	2	0	0
MF	(Portugal)	29	Mathias Pereira Lage	2	0	0	0	0	0	2	0	0
MF	(France)	37	Félix Lemaréchal	2	0	0	0	0	0	2	0	0
FW	(France)	10	Romain Del Castillo	2	0	0	0	0	0	2	0	0
FW	(Benin)	15	Steve Mounié	2	0	0	0	0	0	2	0	0
DF	(Morocco)	4	Achraf Dari	1	0	0	0	0	0	1	0	0
FW	(France)	9	Franck Honorat	1	0	0	0	0	0	1	0	0
FW	(France)	22	Jérémy Le Douaron	1	0	0	0	0	0	1	0	0
			TOTALS	63	0	1	1	0	0	64	0	1
