= Steve Mounié =

Beninese footballer (born 1994)

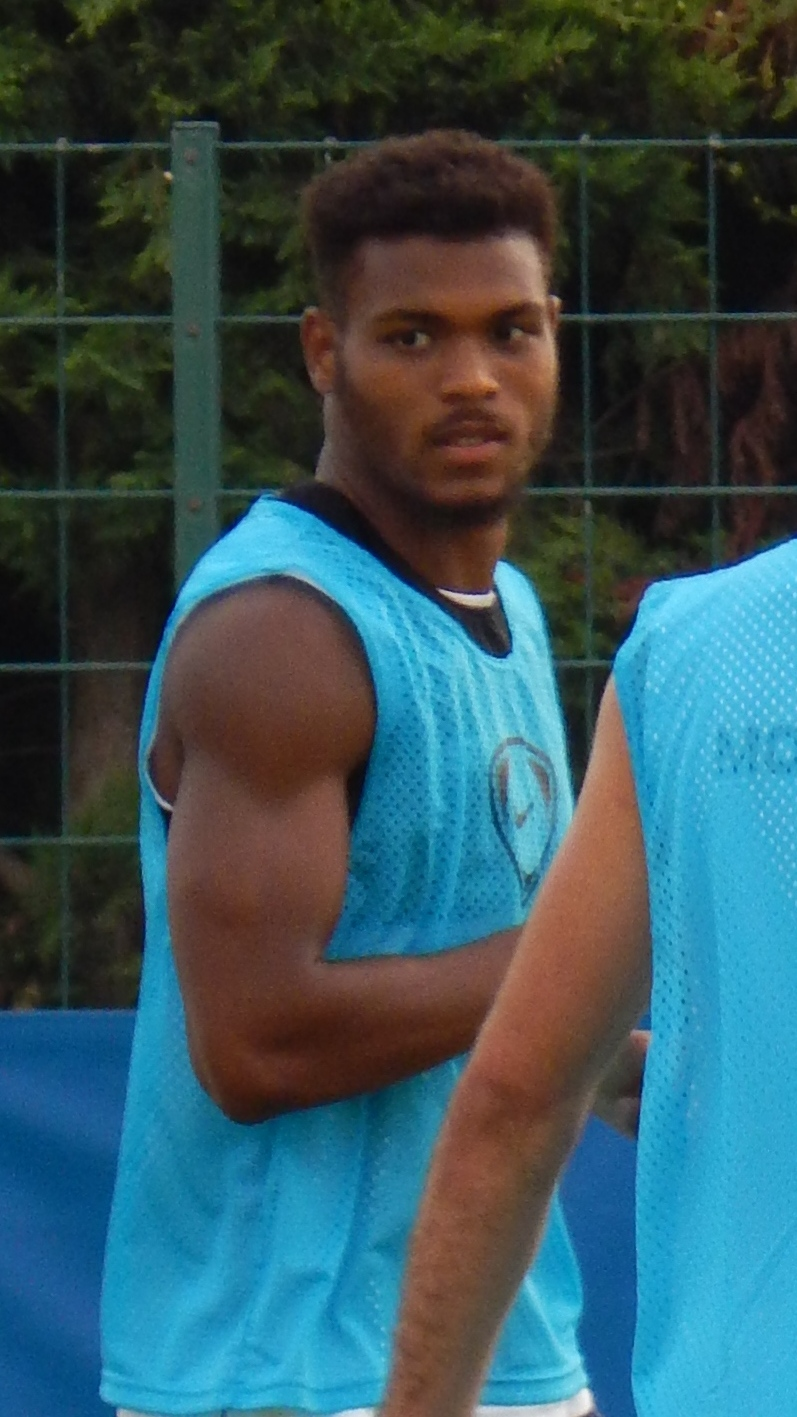
- Mounié training in 2014

Personal information
- Full name: Steve Michel Mounié
- Date of birth: 29 September 1994 (age 32)
- Place of birth: Parakou, Benin
- Height: 1.90 m (6 ft 3 in)
- Position: Striker

Team information
- Current team: FC Augsburg
- Number: 15

Youth career
- 2009–2014: Montpellier

Senior career*
Years	Team	Apps	(Gls)
2014–2017	Montpellier	37	(14)
2015–2016	→ Nîmes (loan)	32	(11)
2017–2020	Huddersfield Town	89	(17)
2020–2024	Brest	125	(30)
2024–	FC Augsburg	16	(1)
2025–2026	→ Alanyaspor (loan)	21	(2)

International career^{‡}
2015–	Benin	71	(23)
- * Club domestic league appearances and goals as of 16 May 2026 ‡ National team caps and goals as of 31 March 2026

Steve Michel Mounié (born 29 September 1994) is a Beninese professional footballer who plays as a striker for Bundesliga club FC Augsburg and the Benin national team.

== Club career ==
=== Montpellier ===
Mounié is a Montpellier youth academy graduate. He made his first team debut on 28 October 2014 in a 2014–15 Coupe de la Ligue round of 32 home match against Ajaccio, replacing Jean Deza after 86 minutes; Montpellier lost the match 1–0.

On 31 August 2015, Mounié was loaned to Nîmes of Ligue 2 for the rest of the 2015–16 season. He was the club's top scorer for the season, with 11 goals in 33 competitive matches, all of them scored during the league campaign.

On 29 June 2016, Mounié extended his contract with Montpellier by two years to 30 June 2019.

On 11 March 2017, Mounié scored for the fifth consecutive Ligue 1 match in a 3–2 home loss to Nantes; it was his 13th league goal of the season.

=== Huddersfield Town ===
On 5 July 2017, Mounié joined newly promoted Premier League club Huddersfield Town on a four-year deal for a club record fee of €13 million (£11.5 million) plus add-ons. The record fee surpassed the previous record £8 million (initial fee) that the club spent on Aaron Mooy from Manchester City a week earlier.

Mounié made his competitive debut on 12 August 2017, scoring twice in Huddersfield's first match in the division, a 3–0 win at Crystal Palace. On 11 February 2018, he scored, assisted Mooy and forced an own goal in a 4–1 home win over AFC Bournemouth.

=== Brest ===
On 9 September 2020, Mounié signed with Ligue 1 side Brest.

=== FC Augsburg ===
On 5 July 2024, Mouniè joined Bundesliga side FC Augsburg on a three-year contract.

== International career ==
Mounié made his debut for the Benin national team in 2015 and scored his first international goal in March 2016 against South Sudan. He subsequently established himself as a key forward for the national team, scoring in a 2019 Africa Cup of Nations qualifying match against Gambia in November 2018. In March 2019, he scored the winning goal in the 83rd minute of the final qualifying match against Togo, securing a 2–1 victory for Benin. The win ensured that Benin finished second in their group behind Algeria, qualifying for the tournament.

Mounié participated in the 2019 Africa Cup of Nations. Shortly before the tournament, he scored a hat-trick in a friendly against Mauritania, helping Benin secure a 3–1 victory. In the group stage, Benin drew all three of their matches against Ghana, Guinea-Bissau and Cameroon, advancing to the round of 16. They subsequently defeated Morocco on penalties after a 1–1 draw in the round of 16, but lost 1–0 to Senegal in the quarter-finals. Benin reached the quarter-finals for the first time in their history, with Mounié appearing in all four matches.

Mounié was also part of the Benin national team squad for the 2025 Africa Cup of Nations. Benin recorded their first-ever victory in the tournament's history during the group stage and advanced to the round of 16. However, Mounié was suspended for the match against Egypt due to an accumulation of yellow cards. Benin were eliminated after losing 3–1 to Egypt following extra time. Benin head coach Gernot Rohr stated that Mounié's absence had a significant impact on the team's attacking play.

== Career statistics ==
=== Club ===
As of match played 27 April 2026

Appearances and goals by club, season and competition
Club	Season	League			National cup (Note: Includes Coupe de France, FA Cup, DFB-Pokal, Turkish Cup)		League cup (Note: Includes Coupe de la Ligue, EFL Cup)		Total	
Club	Season	Division	Apps	Goals	Apps	Goals	Apps	Goals	Apps	Goals
Montpellier	2014–15	Ligue 1	0	0	0	0	1	0	1	0
Montpellier	2015–16	Ligue 1	2	0	0	0	0	0	2	0
Montpellier	2016–17	Ligue 1	35	14	1	0	2	1	38	15
Montpellier	Total		37	14	1	0	3	1	41	15
Nîmes (loan)	2015–16	Ligue 2	32	11	1	0	0	0	33	11
Huddersfield Town	2017–18	Premier League	28	7	3	2	0	0	31	9
Huddersfield Town	2018–19	Premier League	31	2	1	0	0	0	32	2
Huddersfield Town	2019–20	Championship	30	8	1	0	1	0	32	8
Huddersfield Town	Total		89	17	5	2	1	0	95	19
Brest	2020–21	Ligue 1	35	9	2	1	—		37	10
Brest	2021–22	Ligue 1	35	9	3	1	—		38	10
Brest	2022–23	Ligue 1	23	6	2	0	—		25	6
Brest	2023–24	Ligue 1	32	6	3	1	—		35	7
Brest	Total		125	30	10	3	0	0	135	33
FC Augsburg	2024–25	Bundesliga	16	1	1	0	—		17	1
FC Augsburg	2025–26	Bundesliga	0	0	1	1	—		1	1
FC Augsburg	Total		16	1	2	1	—		18	2
Alanyaspor (loan)	2025–26	Süper Lig	21	2	4	7	—		25	9
Career total			230	75	23	13	4	1	377	89

=== International ===
As of match played 31 March 2026

Appearances and goals by national team and year
National team	Year	Apps	Goals
Benin	2015	2	0
Benin	2016	3	1
Benin	2017	4	0
Benin	2018	4	1
Benin	2019	12	5
Benin	2020	3	1
Benin	2021	9	3
Benin	2022	5	2
Benin	2023	8	3
Benin	2024	10	3
Benin	2025	9	3
Benin	2026	2	1
Total		71	23

Scores and results list Benin's goal tally first, score column indicates score after each Mounié goal.

List of international goals scored by Steve Mounié
No.	Date	Venue	Opponent	Score	Result	Competition
1	23 March 2016	Juba Stadium, Juba, South Sudan	South Sudan	2–0	2–1	2017 Africa Cup of Nations qualification
2	17 November 2018	Independence Stadium, Bakau, Gambia	Gambia	1–0	1–3	2019 Africa Cup of Nations qualification
3	24 March 2019	Stade de l'Amitié, Cotonou, Benin	Togo	2–1	2–1	2019 Africa Cup of Nations qualification
4	18 June 2019	Stade de Marrakech, Marrakesh, Morocco	Mauritania	1–0	3–1	Friendly
5	18 June 2019	Stade de Marrakech, Marrakesh, Morocco	Mauritania	2–1	3–1	Friendly
6	18 June 2019	Stade de Marrakech, Marrakesh, Morocco	Mauritania	3–1	3–1	Friendly
7	13 October 2019	Stade Charles de Gaulle, Porto-Novo, Benin	Zambia	1–1	2–2	Friendly
8	11 October 2020	Estádio Pina Manique, Lisbon, Portugal	Gabon	2–0	2–0	Friendly
9	2 September 2021	Mahamasina Municipal Stadium, Antananarivo, Madagascar	Madagascar	1–0	1–0	2022 FIFA World Cup qualification
10	7 October 2021	National Stadium, Dar es Salaam, Tanzania	Tanzania	1–0	1–0	2022 FIFA World Cup qualification
11	11 November 2021	Stade de l'Amitié, Cotonou, Benin	Madagascar	2–0	2–0	2022 FIFA World Cup qualification
12	24 March 2022	Mardan Sports Complex, Antalya, Turkey	Liberia	4–0	4–0	Friendly
13	29 March 2022	Mardan Sports Complex, Antalya, Turkey	Togo	1–1	1–1	Friendly
14	22 March 2023	Stade de l'Amitié, Cotonou, Benin	Rwanda	1–1	1–1	2023 Africa Cup of Nations qualification
15	9 September 2023	Estádio do Zimpeto, Maputo, Mozambique	Mozambique	1–0	2–3	2023 Africa Cup of Nations qualification
16	18 November 2023	Moses Mabhida Stadium, Durban, South Africa	South Africa	1–2	1–2	2026 FIFA World Cup qualification
17	10 June 2024	Felix Houphouet Boigny Stadium, Abidjan, Ivory Coast	Nigeria	2–1	2–1	2026 FIFA World Cup qualification
18	10 September 2024	Felix Houphouet Boigny Stadium, Abidjan, Ivory Coast	Libya	1–1	2–1	2025 Africa Cup of Nations qualification
19	11 October 2024	Felix Houphouet Boigny Stadium, Abidjan, Ivory Coast	Rwanda	1–0	3–0	2025 Africa Cup of Nations qualification
20	20 March 2025	Moses Mabhida Stadium, Durban, South Africa	Zimbabwe	1–0	2–2	2026 FIFA World Cup qualification
21	5 September 2025	Alassane Ouattara Stadium, Abidjan, Ivory Coast	Zimbabwe	1–0	1–0	2026 FIFA World Cup qualification
22	9 September 2025	Felix Houphouet Boigny Stadium, Abidjan, Ivory Coast	Lesotho	1–0	4–0	2026 FIFA World Cup qualification
23	31 March 2026	Larbi Zaouli Stadium, Casablanca, Morocco	Guinea	1–0	1–0	Friendly
