= Hugo Magnetti =

French footballer (born 1998)

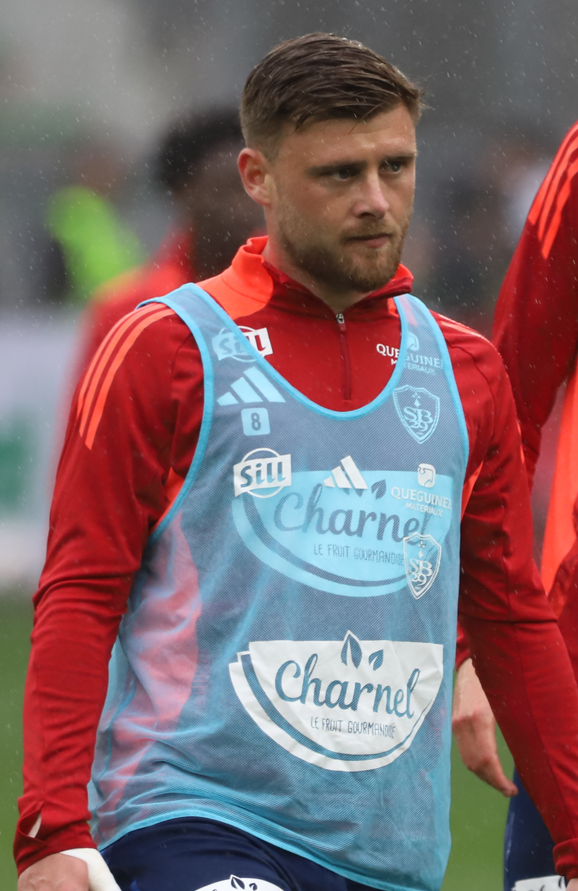
- Magnetti in 2025

Personal information
- Date of birth: 30 May 1998 (age 28)
- Place of birth: Marseille, France
- Height: 1.72 m (5 ft 8 in)
- Position: Midfielder

Team information
- Current team: Brest
- Number: 8

Youth career
- 2002–2004: ASPTT Marseille
- 2004–2007: Marseille
- 2007–2014: Burel FC
- 2014–2017: Bastia

Senior career*
Years	Team	Apps	(Gls)
2016–2017	Bastia II	22	(2)
2017–2019	Brest II	43	(6)
2018–	Brest	180	(5)
- * Club domestic league appearances and goals as of 19 May 2026

Hugo Magnetti (born 30 May 1998) is a French professional footballer who plays as a midfielder for Ligue 1 club Brest.

== Career ==
Born in Marseille, Magnetti spent his youth career with various local clubs in his hometown before moving to SC Bastia in Corsica at 16. On 31 May 2018, he joined Stade Brestois 29 in Ligue 2. He made his professional debut with Brest in a 1–0 Ligue 2 loss to FC Metz on 30 July 2018. On 19 September 2024, during a UEFA Champions League game against Sturm Graz, he scored Brest’s first-ever European goal, for its debut in a UEFA club competition.

== Personal life ==
Born in France, Magnetti is of Italian descent.

== Career statistics ==
=== Club ===
As of match played 3 May 2026

Appearances and goals by club, season and competition
Club	Season	League			Cup		League cup		Europe		Other		Total	
Club	Season	Division	Apps	Goals	Apps	Goals	Apps	Goals	Apps	Goals	Apps	Goals	Apps	Goals
Rennes	2015–16	CFA 2	5	0	—		—		—		—		5	0
Rennes	2016–17	CFA 2	17	2	—		—		—		—		17	2
Rennes	Total		22	2	—		—		—		—		22	2
Rennes	2017–18	National 3	20	3	—		—		—		—		20	3
Rennes	2018–19	National 3	20	2	—		—		—		—		20	2
Rennes	2019–20	National 3	3	1	—		—		—		—		3	1
Rennes	Total		43	6	—		—		—		—		43	6
Brest	2018–19	Ligue 2	1	0	2	0	0	0	—		—		3	0
Brest	2019–20	Ligue 1	8	0	1	0	3	0	—		—		12	0
Brest	2020–21	Ligue 1	13	0	1	0	—		—		—		14	0
Brest	2021–22	Ligue 1	28	0	1	0	—		—		—		29	0
Brest	2022–23	Ligue 1	32	1	2	0	—		—		—		34	1
Brest	2023–24	Ligue 1	33	2	3	0	—		—		—		36	2
Brest	2024–25	Ligue 1	32	1	4	0	—		10	1	—		46	2
Brest	2025–26	Ligue 1	30	1	0	0	—		—		—		30	1
Brest	Total		177	5	14	0	3	0	10	1	—		204	6
Career total			242	13	14	0	3	0	10	1	0	0	269	14
