= Antonin Cartillier =

French footballer (born 2004)

Personal information
- Date of birth: 23 June 2004 (age 22)
- Place of birth: Blois, France
- Height: 1.76 m (5 ft 9 in)
- Position: Left-back

Team information
- Current team: Rodez
- Number: 29

Youth career
- Cravant
- –2019: Blois
- 2019–2023: Monaco

Senior career*
Years	Team	Apps	(Gls)
2022	Monaco B	1	(0)
2023–2024	Monaco	1	(0)
2024	→ Brest (loan)	0	(0)
2024–2025	Orléans	19	(0)
2025–2026	Rouen	23	(1)
2026–	Rodez	0	(0)
- * Club domestic league appearances and goals as of 16 May 2026

Antonin Cartillier (born 23 June 2004) is a French professional footballer who plays as a left-back for Ligue 2 club Rodez.

== Career ==
Cartillier was a youth player for his hometown club Blois before joining the Monaco under-17s in July 2019. He was the captain of the club's under-19s that reached the 2022 Championnat National U19 final, losing to Nantes. On 5 July 2022, he signed his first professional contract with Monaco. He made his Ligue 1 debut for the club in a 3–1 defeat at home to Reims on 13 January 2024. On 1 February 2024, Cartillier joined fellow Ligue 1 club Brest on loan until the end of the season. He was signed as a back-up for starting left-back Bradley Locko.

On 2 September 2024, Cartillier joined Championnat National club Orléans for no transfer fee, signing a contract until the end of the season.

On 2 July 2026, Cartillier signed a three-year contract with Rodez in Ligue 2.

== Honours ==
Monaco U19

- Championnat National U19 runner-up: 2021–22
