= Brendan Chardonnet =

French footballer (born 1994)

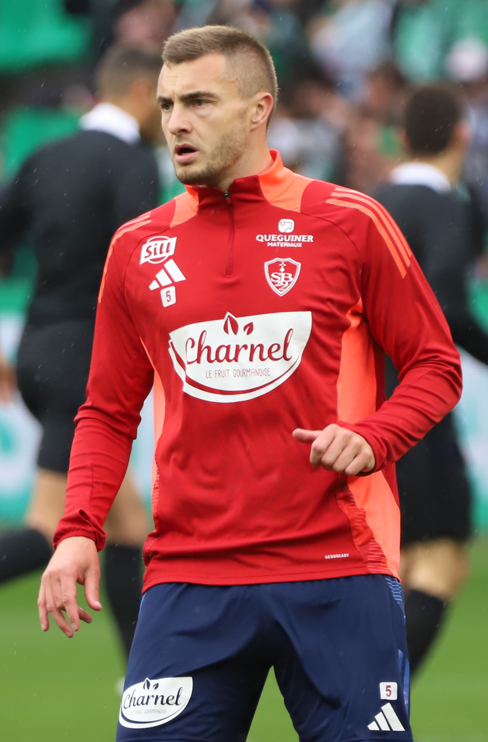
- Chardonnet with Brest in 2025

Personal information
- Full name: Brendan Auguste Chardonnet
- Date of birth: 22 December 1994 (age 31)
- Place of birth: Saint-Renan, Finistère, France
- Height: 1.81 m (5 ft 11 in)
- Position: Centre-back

Team information
- Current team: Brest
- Number: 5

Senior career*
Years	Team	Apps	(Gls)
2013–	Brest	255	(11)
2013–2014	Brest B	4	(0)
2015–2016	→ Épinal (loan)	20	(2)
- * Club domestic league appearances and goals as of 19 May 2026

Brendan Auguste Chardonnet (born 22 December 1994) is a French professional footballer who plays as a centre-back for Ligue 1 club Brest.

== Career ==
Chardonnet made his professional debut for Brest in a 3–1 Ligue 1 defeat to Paris Saint-Germain in May 2013, coming on the pitch for the last half-hour of the game.

== Career statistics ==
As of match played 5 November 2024

Appearances and goals by club, season and competition
Club	Season	League			Coupe de France		Coupe de la Ligue		Continental		Total	
Club	Season	Division	Apps	Goals	Apps	Goals	Apps	Goals	Apps	Goals	Apps	Goals
Brest	2012–13	Ligue 1	1	0	0	0	0	0	—		1	0
Brest	2013–14	Ligue 2	15	0	1	0	0	0	—		16	0
Brest	2014–15	Ligue 2	9	0	1	0	0	0	—		10	0
Brest	2016–17	Ligue 2	14	0	1	0	1	0	—		16	0
Brest	2017–18	Ligue 2	8	0	0	0	0	0	—		8	0
Brest	2018–19	Ligue 2	10	2	3	0	2	1	—		15	3
Brest	2019–20	Ligue 1	12	0	0	0	3	0	—		15	0
Brest	2020–21	Ligue 1	33	3	0	0	—		—		33	3
Brest	2021–22	Ligue 1	32	3	3	0	—		—		35	3
Brest	2022–23	Ligue 1	30	0	0	0	—		—		30	0
Brest	2023–24	Ligue 1	33	0	3	0	—		—		36	0
Brest	2024–25	Ligue 1	8	0	0	0	—		3	0	11	0
Brest	Total		212	9	14	0	6	1	3	0	229	10
Épinal (loan)	2015–16	National	20	2	0	0	—		—		20	2
Career total			232	11	14	0	6	1	3	0	249	12
