= Haris Belkebla =

French and Algerian footballer (born 1994)

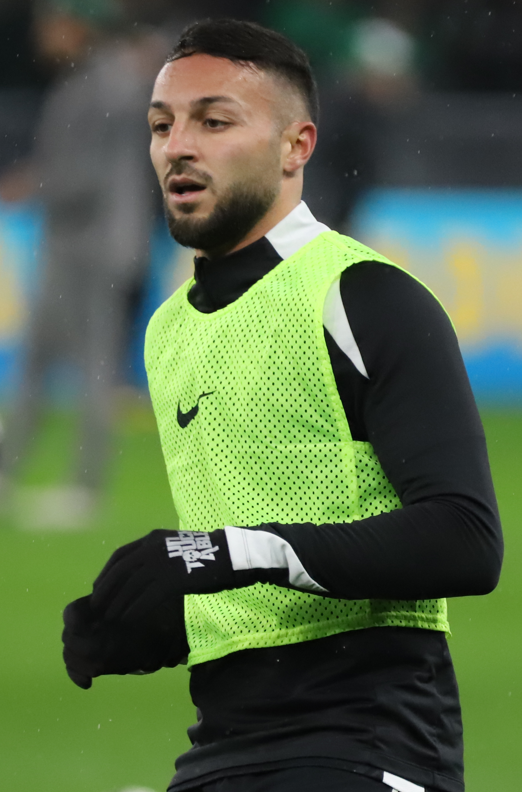
- Belkebla with Angers in 2025

Personal information
- Date of birth: 3 August 2000 (age 26)
- Place of birth: La Courneuve, France
- Height: 1.77 m (5 ft 10 in)
- Position: Midfielder

Team information
- Current team: Angers
- Number: 93

Youth career
- 2011–2012: Boulogne

Senior career*
Years	Team	Apps	(Gls)
2012–2014	Valenciennes B	36	(0)
2014–2018	Tours	136	(5)
2014	Tours B	2	(0)
2018–2023	Brest	160	(3)
2023–2024	Ohod	1	(0)
2024–	Angers	55	(0)

International career^{‡}
2016	Algeria U23	3	(0)
2019–	Algeria	11	(0)
- * Club domestic league appearances and goals as of 25 May 2026 ‡ National team caps and goals as of 7 October 2023

Haris Belkebla (Arabic: حارس بلقبلة; born 28 January 1994) is a professional footballer who plays as a midfielder for Ligue 1 club Angers. Born in France, he also plays for the Algeria national team.

== Club career ==
Born in La Courneuve, Belkebla began his career in the youth ranks of Boulogne before joining Valenciennes in 2012. In 2014, he joined Tours, signing an amateur contract with the club. He made his Ligue 2 debut on 8 August 2014 against Troyes in a 1–0 away loss.

In summer 2018, he moved to Brest.

On 12 September 2023, Belkebla joined Saudi First Division League club Ohod. On 18 August 2024, he returned to France by signing for Angers on a two-year contract.

== International career ==
In October 2012, Belkebla was called up to the Algeria under-20 national team for the first time in preparation for the 2013 African U-20 Championship.

He was called up to the Algeria national football team playing the 2019 Africa Cup of Nations, but was shortly kicked off the team by the manager Djamel Belmadi for mooning on a live stream of his teammate Alexandre Oukidja playing Fortnite. He debuted for Algeria in a 5–0 win over Zambia on 14 November 2019.

== Personal life ==
Belkebla is the nephew of former professional footballer Youssef Belkebla, who played for Red Star and Saint-Étienne.

== Career statistics ==
=== Club ===
As of 19 May 2026

Appearances and clubs, season and competition
Club	Season	League			Cup		League Cup		Total	
Club	Season	Division	Apps	Goals	Apps	Goals	Apps	Goals	Apps	Goals
Valenciennes B	2012–13	Championnat de France Amateur	16	0	–		–		16	0
Valenciennes B	2013–14	Championnat de France Amateur 2	20	0	–		–		20	0
Valenciennes B	Total		36	0	0	0	0	0	36	0
Tours	2014–15	Ligue 2	36	2	3	0	1	0	40	2
Tours	2015–16	Ligue 2	34	2	2	1	3	1	39	4
Tours	2016–17	Ligue 2	31	0	0	0	0	0	31	0
Tours	2017–18	Ligue 2	35	1	3	0	4	0	42	1
Tours	Total		136	5	8	1	8	1	152	7
Tours B	2014–15	Championnat de France Amateur 2	2	0	–		–		2	0
Brest	2018–19	Ligue 2	33	1	1	0	2	0	36	1
Brest	2019–20	Ligue 1	23	0	0	0	0	0	23	0
Brest	2020–21	Ligue 1	35	0	1	0	0	0	36	0
Brest	2021–22	Ligue 1	31	0	1	0	0	0	32	0
Brest	2022–23	Ligue 1	38	2	2	0	0	0	40	1
Ohod	2023-2024	King's Cup	1	0	0	0	0	0	1	0
Angers	2024-2025	Ligue 1	22	0	2	0	0	0	24	0
Angers	2025-2026	Ligue 1	33	0	1	0	0	0	34	0
	Total		218	3	8	0	2	0	226	2
Career total			390	8	16	1	10	1	319	9
