= Lilian Brassier =

French footballer (born 1999)

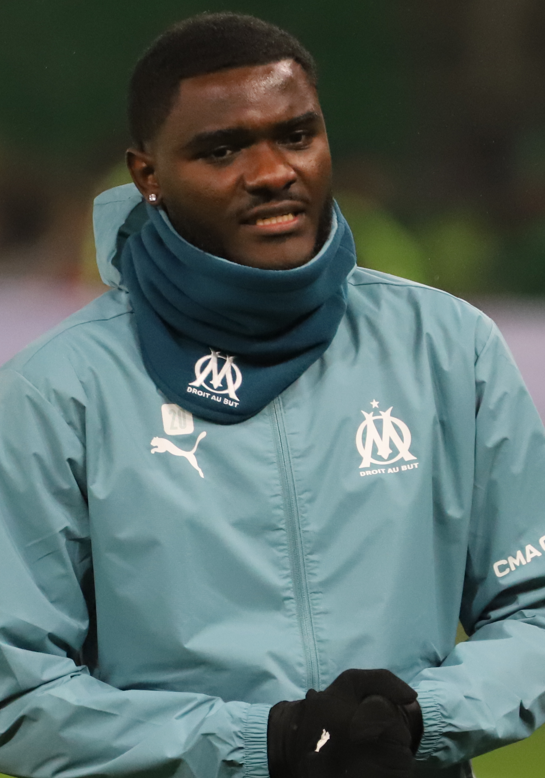
- Brassier with Marseille in 2024

Personal information
- Date of birth: 2 November 1999 (age 27)
- Place of birth: Argenteuil, France
- Height: 1.86 m (6 ft 1 in)
- Position: Centre-back

Team information
- Current team: Eintracht Frankfurt
- Number: 3

Youth career
- 2006–2010: Val-d'Argenteuil
- 2010–2013: RFC Argenteuil
- 2013–2017: Rennes

Senior career*
Years	Team	Apps	(Gls)
2017–2021	Rennes II	43	(2)
2019–2020	→ Valenciennes (loan)	24	(0)
2020–2021	→ Brest (loan)	11	(1)
2021–2025	Brest	104	(4)
2024–2025	→ Marseille (loan)	12	(0)
2025	→ Rennes (loan)	14	(1)
2025–2026	Rennes	27	(0)
2026–	Eintracht Frankfurt	8	(0)

International career^{‡}
2018	France U19	1	(0)
2017–2019	France U20	5	(0)
2026–	Togo	2	(0)
- * Club domestic league appearances and goals as of 7 November 2026 ‡ National team caps and goals as of 17 November 2026

Lilian Brassier (born 2 November 1999) is a professional footballer who plays as a centre-back for Bundesliga club Eintracht Frankfurt. Born in France, he represented it internationally as a junior, before switching allegiance to Togo for senior level.

== Club career ==
=== Rennes ===
On 20 June 2019, Brassier signed a professional contract with Rennes and immediately went on loan with Valenciennes.

=== Valenciennes ===
He made his professional debut with Valenciennes in a 1–1 Ligue 2 tie with Nancy on 2 August 2019.

=== Brest ===
In 2020, Brassier signed for Brest on loan with an option to buy if the club stayed up in Ligue 1. On 13 March 2021, he scored his first Ligue 1 goal in a 3–1 defeat against Marseille. His loan deal was made permanent after Brest secured safety on the final matchday of the season.

In the 2023–24 season, he contributed to his club's impressive campaign, as they secured a third-place finish in the league and first ever qualification to the UEFA Champions League.

==== Loan to Marseille ====
On 3 July 2024, Brassier signed with Marseille on loan with an option to buy for €12 million. Marseille decided not to activate the option, leading to the termination of his loan in January 2025.

=== Rennes ===
On 31 January 2025, Brassier signed for his former club Rennes on a six-month loan with a €12 million buy option.

=== Eintracht Frankfurt ===
On 31 August 2026, Brassier signed a five-season contract with Eintracht Frankfurt in Germany.

== International career ==
Born in France, Brassier is of Togolese descent. He is a former youth international for France.

In 2026, Brassier switched his allegiance to the Togo national team and made his senior international debut on 14 November 2026 in an AFCON qualifier against Algeria.

== Career statistics ==
As of match played 1 November 2026

Appearances and goals by club, season and competition
Club	Season	League			National cup		League Cup		Continental		Other		Total	
Club	Season	Division	Apps	Goals	Apps	Goals	Apps	Goals	Apps	Goals	Apps	Goals	Apps	Goals
Rennes II	2016–17	CFA 1	2	0	—		—		—		—		2	0
Rennes II	2017–18	CFA 1	25	0	—		—		—		—		25	0
Rennes II	2018–19	National 2	16	2	—		—		—		—		16	2
Rennes II	Total		43	2	—		—		—		—		43	2
Valenciennes (loan)	2019–20	Ligue 2	24	0	2	0	1	0	—		—		27	0
Brest (loan)	2020–21	Ligue 1	11	1	2	0	—		—		—		13	1
Brest	2021–22	Ligue 1	31	1	3	0	—		—		—		34	1
Brest	2022–23	Ligue 1	36	0	2	0	—		—		—		38	0
Brest	2023–24	Ligue 1	30	3	2	0	—		—		—		32	3
Brest	Total		97	4	7	0	—		—		—		104	4
Marseille (loan)	2024–25	Ligue 1	13	0	0	0	—		—		—		13	0
Rennes (loan)	2024–25	Ligue 1	27	0	—		—		—		—		27	0
Eintracht Frankfurt	2026–27	Bundesliga	7	0	0	0	—		—		—		7	0
Career total			222	7	11	0	1	0	0	0	0	0	234	7
