= Grégoire Coudert =

French footballer (born 1999)

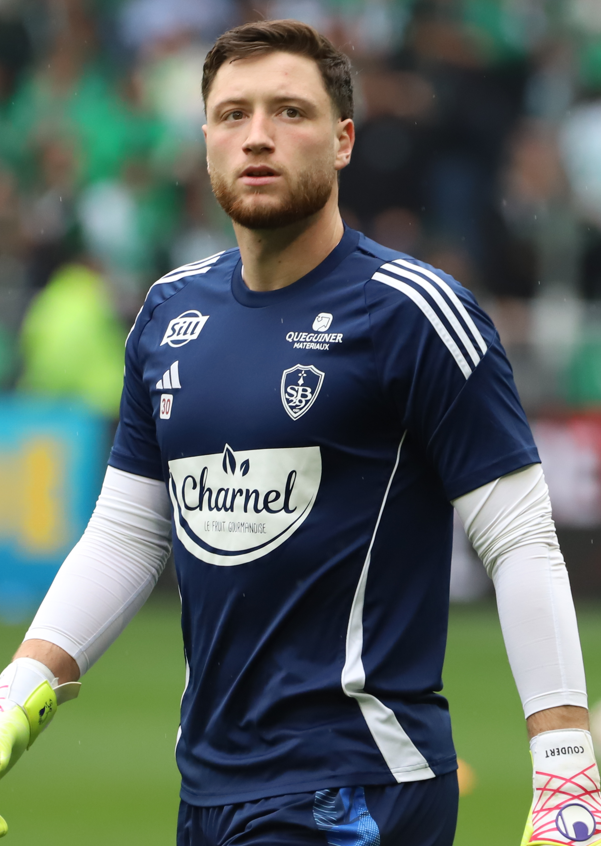
- Coudert with Brest in 2025

Personal information
- Full name: Grégoire Coudert
- Date of birth: 3 April 1999 (age 27)
- Place of birth: Tours, France
- Height: 1.88 m (6 ft 2 in)
- Position: Goalkeeper

Team information
- Current team: Burnley
- Number: 37

Youth career
- 2005–2009: Rodez
- 2010–2014: Brive
- 2014–2016: Tours

Senior career*
| Years | Team | Apps | (Gls) |
| 2016–2019 | Tours B | 29 | (0) |
| 2017–2019 | Tours | 5 | (0) |
| 2019–2021 | Amiens B | 14 | (0) |
| 2019–2021 | Amiens | 2 | (0) |
| 2021–2026 | Brest B | 18 | (0) |
| 2021–2026 | Brest | 30 | (0) |
| 2026– | Burnley | 8 | (0) |
- * Club domestic league appearances and goals as of 09:30, 8 November 2026 (UTC)

Grégoire Coudert (born 3 April 1999) is a French professional footballer who plays as a goalkeeper for EFL Championship club Burnley.

== Career ==
Coudert signed a professional intern contract with Tours on 23 June 2017. He made his first team debut for the club in a 2–1 Ligue 2 loss to Nancy on 8 December 2017. He moved to Amiens in the summer of 2019, and signed his first senior professional contract on 29 June 2020.

On 5 July 2021, Coudert signed a one-year contract with Brest. On 19 August 2026, he signed for EFL Championship club Burnley.

== Career statistics ==
=== Club ===
As of match played 7 November 2026

Appearances and goals by club, season and competition
| Club | Season | League | | | National cup (Note: Includes Coupe de France) | | League cup (Note: Includes Coupe de la Ligue, EFL Cup) | | Europe | | Total | |
| Club | Season | Division | Apps | Goals | Apps | Goals | Apps | Goals | Apps | Goals | Apps | Goals |
|---|---|---|---|---|---|---|---|---|---|---|---|---|
| Tours | 2017–18 | Ligue 2 | 2 | 0 | 2 | 0 | 1 | 0 | — | | 5 | 0 |
| Tours | 2018–19 | Championnat National | 3 | 0 | 1 | 0 | 0 | 0 | — | | 4 | 0 |
| Tours | Total | | 5 | 0 | 3 | 0 | 1 | 0 | 0 | 0 | 9 | 0 |
| Amiens | 2020–21 | Ligue 2 | 2 | 0 | 0 | 0 | — | | — | | 2 | 0 |
| Brest | 2021–22 | Ligue 1 | 0 | 0 | 0 | 0 | — | | — | | 0 | 0 |
| Brest | 2022–23 | Ligue 1 | 0 | 0 | 0 | 0 | — | | — | | 0 | 0 |
| Brest | 2023–24 | Ligue 1 | 3 | 0 | 3 | 0 | — | | — | | 6 | 0 |
| Brest | 2024–25 | Ligue 1 | 2 | 0 | 4 | 0 | — | | 1 (Note: Appearance in UEFA Champions League) | 0 | 7 | 0 |
| Brest | 2025–26 | Ligue 1 | 25 | 0 | 1 | 0 | — | | — | | 26 | 0 |
| Brest | Total | | 30 | 0 | 8 | 0 | 0 | 0 | 1 | 0 | 39 | 0 |
| Burnley | 2026–27 | Championship | 8 | 0 | 0 | 0 | 1 | 0 | — | | 9 | 0 |
| Career total | | | 45 | 0 | 11 | 0 | 2 | 0 | 1 | 0 | 59 | 0 |
