= Bradley Locko =

French footballer (born 2002)

Personal information
- Full name: Banzouzi Bradley Locko
- Date of birth: 6 May 2002 (age 24)
- Place of birth: Ivry-sur-Seine, Val-de-Marne, France
- Height: 1.80 m (5 ft 11 in)
- Position: Left-back

Team information
- Current team: Brest
- Number: 2

Youth career
- –2019: Montrouge
- 2019–2020: Lorient
- 2020–2021: Reims

Senior career*
Years	Team	Apps	(Gls)
2020–2023	Reims II	5	(0)
2021–2023	Reims	39	(1)
2023	→ Brest (loan)	7	(0)
2023–	Brest	56	(0)

International career^{‡}
2023	France U21	1	(0)
2024	France Olympic	5	(0)
Medal record
Men's football
Olympic Games
Silver medal – second place	Paris 2024	Team
- * Club domestic league appearances and goals as of 19 May 2026 ‡ National team caps and goals as of 20:06, 9 August 2024 (UTC)

Banzouzi Bradley Locko (born 6 May 2002) is a French professional footballer who plays as a left-back for Ligue 1 club Brest.

== Club career ==
Locko was born in Ivry-sur-Seine, Val-de-Marne, and went through several football academies in Paris suburbs, including Vitry and Ivry, before spending some years in Montrouge, from where he joined Lorient in 2019.

Bradley signed his first professional contract with Reims in June 2020, spending his first year in Champagne with the National 2 reserve team.

He made his professional debut for Reims on 15 August 2021, starting the Ligue 1 3–3 home draw against Montpellier as a left-back. His performance was viewed as promising one, among a fairly young Reims team, with the likes of Ilan Kebbal and Hugo Ekitike.

On 31 January 2023, Locko joined Brest on loan with an option to buy. Later that year, on 27 July, Brest announced the permanent signing of Locko on a four-year contract, for a reported fee of €500,000. Later on, he was named in the Team of the Year for the 2023–24 season, as his club secured a third-place finish in the league and first ever qualification to the UEFA Champions League.

== International career ==
On 8 July 2024, Locko was selected by manager Thierry Henry to represent France at the 2024 Olympic Games. He was a late substitute in the final, as France lost 5–3 to Spain.

== Personal life ==
Born in France, Locko holds French and Congolese nationalities. His twin brother, Bryan Locko, is also a footballer who was with him in the academy of Lorient.

== Career statistics ==
As of match played 10 May 2024

Appearances and goals by club, season and competition
Club	Season	League			Coupe de France		Continental		Total	
Club	Season	Division	Apps	Goals	Apps	Goals	Apps	Goals	Apps	Goals
Reims	2021–22	Ligue 1	24	1	2	0	–		26	1
Reims	2022–23	Ligue 1	15	0	2	0	–		17	0
Reims	Total		39	1	4	0	–		43	1
Brest (loan)	2022–23	Ligue 1	7	0	–		–		7	0
Brest	2023–24	Ligue 1	33	0	2	0	–		35	0
Brest	2024–25	Ligue 1	0	0	0	0	0	0	0	0
Brest	Total		40	0	2	0	0	0	42	0
Career total			79	1	6	0	0	0	85	1

== Honours ==
France Olympic

- Summer Olympics silver medal: 2024

Individual

- UNFP Ligue 1 Team of the Year: 2023–24
- The Athletic Ligue 1 Team of the Season: 2023–24

Orders

- Knight of the National Order of Merit: 2024
