= Youssef Belkebla =

French footballer (born 1965)

Personal information
- Date of birth: 5 March 1965 (age 60)
- Place of birth: France
- Position(s): Striker

Senior career*
Years	Team	Apps	(Gls)
–1986	Red Star	57	(6)
1986–1988	Saint-Étienne	17	(0)
1989–1990	Red Star		
- * Club domestic league appearances and goals

Youssef Belkebla (born 5 March 1965) is a French former footballer who played as a striker.

== Early life ==
Belkebla is a native of Aubervilliers, France. He is the son of a road worker father and a housewife mother.

== Career ==
Belkebla started his career with French side Red Star. In 1986, he signed for French Ligue 1 side Saint-Étienne. In 1989, he returned to French side Red Star. He was called up to represent Algeria internationally during the 1980s.

== Personal life ==
Belkebla is the brother of French footballer Zizek Belkebla. After retiring from professional football, he worked as an administrator.
