= Yan Marillat =

French footballer (born 1994)

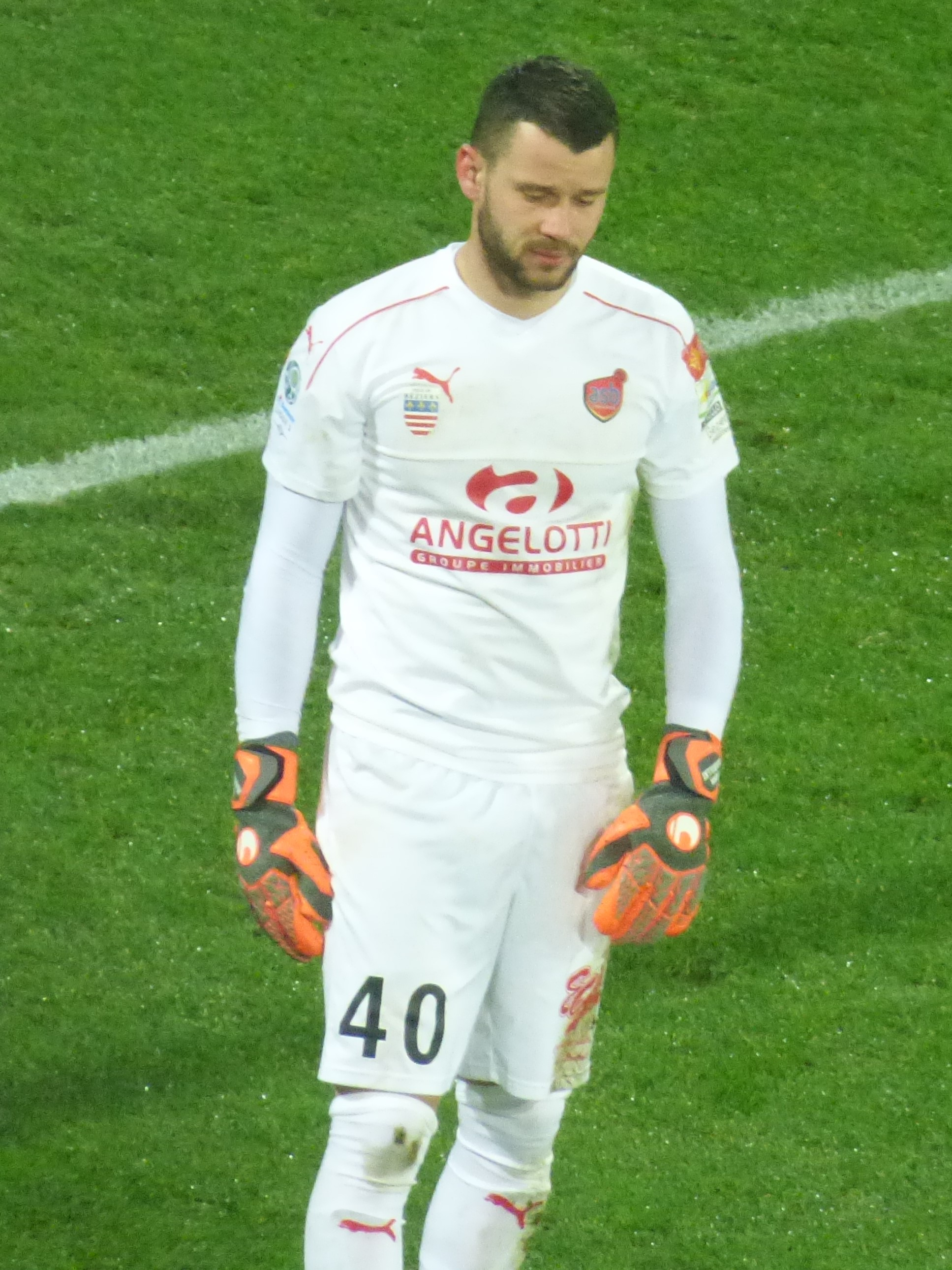
- Marillat with Béziers in 2019

Personal information
- Date of birth: 12 August 1994 (age 32)
- Place of birth: La Tronche, France
- Height: 1.85 m (6 ft 1 in)
- Position: Goalkeeper

Team information
- Current team: Créteil

Youth career
- 2009–2012: Grenoble
- 2012–2013: Nantes

Senior career*
Years	Team	Apps	(Gls)
2013–2014	Grenoble	1	(0)
2014–2015	Sète	1	(0)
2015–2018	Nîmes II	19	(0)
2016–2018	Nîmes	29	(0)
2018–2021	Béziers	18	(0)
2019	Béziers II	18	(0)
2021–2023	Le Puy	42	(0)
2023–2024	Brest	0	(0)
2024–2025	Martigues	11	(0)
2025–	Créteil	0	(0)
- * Club domestic league appearances and goals as of 13 May 2025

Yan Marillat (born 12 August 1994) is a French professional footballer who plays as goalkeeper for Championnat National 1 club Créteil.

== Career ==
Marillat made his professional debut for Nîmes in a 2–1 Ligue 2 loss to Orléans on 18 November 2016. On 28 August 2018, he transferred to Béziers.

On 27 September 2023, Marillat signed for Ligue 1 club Brest on a free transfer.

== Honours ==
Le Puy

- Championnat National 2: 2021–22
