= Adrien Lebeau =

French footballer (born 1999)

Personal information
- Date of birth: 8 July 1999 (age 27)
- Place of birth: Metz, France
- Height: 1.75 m (5 ft 9 in)
- Position: Midfielder

Team information
- Current team: Dunkerque

Youth career
- 2014–2015: Metz
- 2015–2017: Strasbourg

Senior career*
| Years | Team | Apps | (Gls) |
| 2017–2020 | Strasbourg II | 50 | (5) |
| 2019–2021 | Strasbourg | 2 | (0) |
| 2021–2023 | Waldhof Mannheim | 39 | (5) |
| 2023–2024 | Brest | 7 | (0) |
| 2024–2026 | Hansa Rostock | 54 | (6) |
| 2026– | Dunkerque | 0 | (0) |
- * Club domestic league appearances and goals as of 28 May 2026

Adrien Lebeau (born 8 July 1999) is a French professional footballer who plays as a midfielder for Ligue 2 club Dunkerque.

== Club career ==
On 28 May 2019, Lebeau signed his first professional contract with Strasbourg. He made his professional debut with Strasbourg in a 2–0 Ligue 1 loss to Rennes on 25 August 2019.

Lebeau joined 3. Liga club Waldhof Mannheim in August 2021.

On 4 August 2023, Lebeau signed a contract with Brest in Ligue 1 for one season, with an option for a second year.

On 2 July 2024, Lebeau signed for 3. Liga club Hansa Rostock.

On 3 July 2026, Lebeau returned to France and signed with Dunkerque in Ligue 2 for two seasons.
