= Mahdi Camara =

French footballer (born 1998)

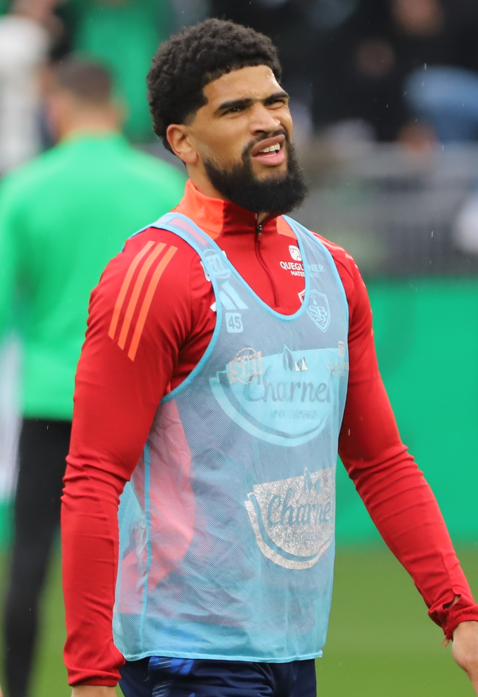
- Camara with Brest in 2025

Personal information
- Full name: Mahdi Cherno Philippe Camara
- Date of birth: 30 June 1998 (age 28)
- Place of birth: Martigues, France
- Height: 1.78 m (5 ft 10 in)
- Position: Midfielder

Team information
- Current team: Rennes
- Number: 45

Youth career
- 2004–2013: Martigues
- 2013–2018: Saint-Étienne

Senior career*
Years	Team	Apps	(Gls)
2016–2019	Saint-Étienne B	57	(9)
2018–2023	Saint-Étienne	89	(6)
2019	→ Laval (loan)	14	(3)
2022–2023	→ Brest (loan)	31	(2)
2023–2025	Brest	66	(12)
2025–	Rennes	32	(3)

International career
2014	France U16	3	(0)
2016	France U19	1	(0)
- * Club domestic league appearances and goals as of 19 May 2026

Mahdi Cherno Philippe Camara (born 30 June 1998) is a French professional footballer who plays as a midfielder for Ligue 1 club Rennes.

== Club career ==
A product from the club's youth academy, Camara signed his first professional contract with Saint-Étienne on 15 March 2018. He made his professional debut with ASSE in a 2–1 Ligue 1 win over Guingamp on 11 August 2018. In January 2019, he was loaned to Laval until the end of the season.

Under manager Claude Puel, Camara was Saint-Étienne's captain. However, with the arrival of Pascal Dupraz in December 2021, he was stripped of the captain's armband. On 26 August 2022, Camara joined Ligue 1 side Brest on a season-long loan with an option-to-buy for a reported fee of €3.5 million.

On 24 February 2024, Camara scored his first hat-trick for Brest against Strasbourg in a 3–0 away win. On the final matchday of the 2023–24 season, he scored the opener and provided an assist in a 3–0 away win over Toulouse, helping his club to secure a third-place finish in the league and first ever qualification to the UEFA Champions League.

On 13 August 2025, Camara joined fellow Ligue 1 side Rennes for a reported fee of €8m, signing a four-year contract.

== International career ==
Having played for France at youth levels. He was called up to the Gambian provisional squad ahead of the 2021 Africa Cup of Nations, but he was not on the final list of 28 players called up by coach Tom Saintfiet.

== Personal life ==
Born in France, Camara is of Gambian descent.

In early April 2022, Camara was suspended from Saint-Étienne's squad for five days after being involved in a physical fight with reserve goalkeeper Yanis Bourbia. Camara broke Bourbia's nose and split his lip, which caused him to be hospitalized. The cause of the fight was tensions between the Camara and Bourbia families in the stands of the Stade Geoffroy-Guichard during a match against Marseille several days earlier.

== Career statistics ==
As of match played 17 May 2025

Appearances and goals by club, season and competition
Club	Season	League			Coupe de France		Europe		Total	
Club	Season	Division	Apps	Goals	Apps	Goals	Apps	Goals	Apps	Goals
Brest (loan)	2022–23	Ligue 1	31	2	2	0	–		33	2
Brest	2023–24	Ligue 1	32	7	3	0	–		35	7
Brest	2024–25	Ligue 1	34	5	3	0	10 (Note: Appearances in UEFA Champions League)	1	47	6
Brest	Brest total		97	14	8	0	10	1	115	15
Career total			97	14	8	0	10	1	115	15

== Honours ==
Saint-Étienne

- Coupe de France runner-up: 2019–20
