= Axel Camblan =

French footballer (born 2003)

Personal information
- Date of birth: 30 August 2003 (age 23)
- Place of birth: Brest, France
- Height: 1.69 m (5 ft 7 in)
- Position: Forward

Team information
- Current team: Estoril Praia
- Number: 9

Youth career
- 2009–2012: Légion Saint Pierre
- 2012–2014: Cavale Blanche
- 2014–2018: EA Saint-Renan
- 2018–2022: Brest

Senior career*
Years	Team	Apps	(Gls)
2021–2022	Brest II	27	(12)
2021–2026	Brest	18	(0)
2023	→ Concarneau (loan)	16	(1)
2025	→ Valenciennes (loan)	17	(1)
2025–2026	→ Clermont (loan)	29	(1)
2026–	Estoril Praia	0	(0)
- * Club domestic league appearances and goals as of 5 September 2026

Axel Camblan (born 30 August 2003) is a French professional footballer who plays as a forward for Primeira Liga club Estoril Praia.

== Career ==
Camblan is a youth product of Légion Saint Pierre, Cavale Blanche, EA Saint-Renan and Brest's youth academy. On 21 September 2022, he signed his first professional contract with the club. after a strong 2021–22 season with their reserves. He made his professional and Ligue 1 debut as a late substitute with Brest in a 2–1 loss to Lorient on 8 October 2022.

On 31 January 2023, Camblan joined Concarneau in the Championnat National on loan until the end of the 2022–23 season.

On 6 January 2025, Camblan joined Valenciennes in the Championnat National on loan until the end of the 2024–25 season.

On 1 September 2025, Camblan was loaned by Clermont in Ligue 2.

== Personal life ==
Camblan's grandfather Alain, and grand-uncle Daniel Camblan were both professional footballers in France.
