= Denis Le Saint =

French businessman (born 1964)

Denis Le Saint (born 1964) is a French businessman. Since 1998, he and his brother Gérard are the directors of the Le Saint food distribution company, established by their parents 40 years earlier. Since 2016, he is the owner and president of Ligue 1 football club Stade Brestois 29.

== Biography ==
Le Saint's parents set up a company bearing the family name, selling fresh fruit and vegetables, in 1958. In 1998, he and his brother Gérard took up leadership of the company. Their company distributes fresh fruit, vegetables, meat and fish to companies, supermarkets and restaurants. In 2018, the company made a turnover of €550 million. As of 2024, his company was the second largest in the sector in France.

In May 2016, Le Saint was confirmed as president of Stade Brestois 29 in Ligue 2 when he owned 51% of the shares. In 2019, Brest were promoted to Ligue 1 for the first time in six years, though manager Jean-Marc Furlan left due to differences with Le Saint.

Le Saint presented plans for a new stadium to replace the Stade Francis-Le Blé in 2022, with a target of opening in 2027 on a budget of €85 million; renovating the current city-owned stadium would have cost €50 million. He and his brother said that they would withdraw from sports ownership if the stadium were not completed. In July 2023, he sold the naming rights to the new stadium to Crédit Mutuel Arkéa on an eight-year deal.

In the 2023–24 Ligue 1, Brest finished 3rd and qualified for the UEFA Champions League for the first time. An inspection by UEFA found that only one stand of the stadium met their regulations to host European matches, limiting the capacity to 5,000. In January 2024, he formally wrote to the Ligue de Football Professionnel (LFP) for use of video assistant referee (VAR) to be scrapped; the request was rejected and VAR was introduced to Ligue 2 as well. Regional newspaper Le Télégramme noted that Le Saint had previously kept a low profile on his ownership of the club, but had become increasingly involved in talking to the media that season.
