= Hianga'a Mbock =

French footballer (born 1999)

Personal information
- Full name: Hianga'a Mananga Mbock
- Date of birth: 28 December 1999 (age 26)
- Place of birth: Brest, France
- Height: 1.86 m (6 ft 1 in)
- Position: Midfielder

Team information
- Current team: Kisvárda
- Number: 80

Youth career
- 2004–2012: AS Brestoise
- 2012–2017: Brest

Senior career*
Years	Team	Apps	(Gls)
2017–2021	Brest II	32	(7)
2019–2025	Brest	32	(1)
2022–2023	→ Caen (loan)	24	(1)
2023–2024	→ Caen (loan)	20	(1)
2024–2025	→ Red Star (loan)	27	(1)
2025–2026	Grenoble	12	(0)
2026–	Kisvárda	13	(1)
- * Club domestic league appearances and goals as of 30 May 2026

Hianga'a Mananga Mbock (born 28 December 1999) is a French professional footballer who plays as a midfielder for Hungarian NB I club Kisvárda.

== Career ==
Mbock is a youth product of AS Brestoise, and joined the youth academy of Brest at the age of 13. Mbock debuted with Brest in a 1–1 Coupe de la Ligue tie with FC Metz on 30 October 2019.

On 31 August 2022, Mbock was loaned to Caen for the season.

On 30 August 2024, Mbock signed for Ligue 2 club Red Star on loan for the season.

On 1 September 2025, Mbock joined Grenoble in Ligue 2 on a two-year contract.

On 23 January 2026, he moved to Kisvárda in Hungary.

== Personal life ==
Born in France, Mbock is of Cameroonian and Malagasy descent. Mbock's sister, Griedge Mbock Bathy, is also a professional footballer who represents France internationally.
