= Christophe Hérelle =

French footballer (born 1992)

Personal information
- Date of birth: 22 August 1992 (age 34)
- Place of birth: Nice, France
- Height: 1.88 m (6 ft 2 in)
- Position: Defender

Team information
- Current team: Manisa
- Number: 4

Youth career
- 2010: Réveil Sportif
- 2010–2013: Sochaux

Senior career*
Years	Team	Apps	(Gls)
2010–2014	Sochaux B	53	(0)
2010–2014	Sochaux	0	(0)
2014–2015	Colmar B	2	(0)
2014–2015	Colmar	53	(1)
2015–2016	Créteil	33	(0)
2016–2018	Troyes	66	(0)
2018–2020	Nice	48	(3)
2020–2023	Brest	55	(0)
2023–2024	Metz	19	(0)
2024–2025	Bodrum	15	(0)
2025–	Manisa	31	(0)
- * Club domestic league appearances and goals as of 6 May 2026

Christophe Hérelle (born 22 August 1992) is a French professional footballer who plays as a defender for Turkish TFF 1. Lig club Manisa.

== Career ==
On 11 August 2020, Hérelle joined Ligue 1 club Brest on a four-year deal.

== Personal life ==
Born in metropolitan France, Hérelle is of Martiniquais descent.
