= Stade Francis-Le Blé =

Football stadium in Brest, France

Coordinates: 48°24′11″N 4°27′42″W

- FLB, l'Armoricaine, chez Francis
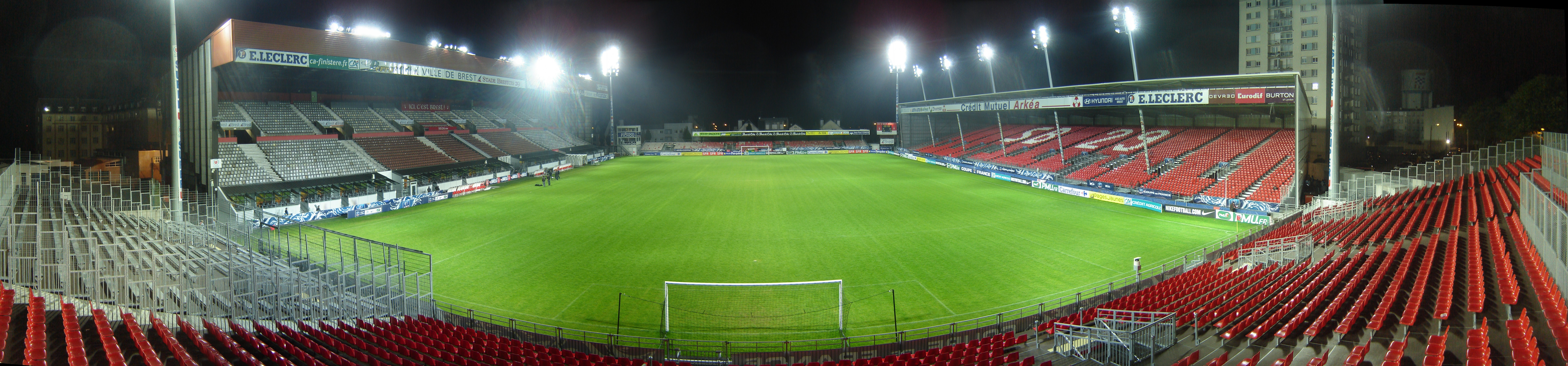
- Interactive map of Stade Francis-Le Blé
- Full name: Stade Francis-Le Blé
- Location: 26 route de Quimper; 29200 Brest, France
- Capacity: 15,220
- Type: Category 2 (UEFA)
- Surface: Grass
- Record attendance: 21,619 (August 8, 1986, OM)

Construction
- Opened: 1922
- Renovated: 2010

Tenant
- Stade Brestois 29

The Stade Francis-Le Blé, formerly known as the Stade de l'Armoricaine, is a multi-use stadium in Brest, France. It is currently used mostly for football matches and is the home stadium of Stade Brestois 29. The stadium is able to hold 15,220 spectators. The stadium is named for Francis Le Blé, former mayor of Brest who died in 1982.

The stadium is classified as a Category 2 stadium by UEFA, making it unable to host UEFA Champions League matches (Note: Category 4 stadiums are required to host UEFA Champions League matches) for the club.

== See also ==
- List of football stadiums in France
- Lists of stadiums
