= List of French football transfers summer 2025 =

This is a list of French football transfers for the 2025 summer transfer window. Only transfers featuring Ligue 1 and Ligue 2 are listed.

== Ligue 1 ==
Note: Flags indicate national team as has been defined under FIFA eligibility rules. Players may hold more than one non-FIFA nationality.

=== Paris Saint-Germain ===
In:

No.	Pos.	Nation	Player
6	DF	UKR	Illia Zabarnyi (from (England) Bournemouth)
30	GK	FRA	Lucas Chevalier (from Lille)
89	GK	ITA	Renato Marin (from (Italy) Roma)

Out:

No.	Pos.	Nation	Player
1	GK	ITA	Gianluigi Donnarumma (to (England) Manchester City)
42	DF	FRA	Yoram Zague (on loan to (Denmark) Copenhagen)
45	DF	MAR	Naoufel El Hannach (on loan to Montpellier)
48	DF	FRA	Axel Tape (to (Germany) Bayer Leverkusen)
70	GK	POR	Louis Mouquet (to (Italy) Padova)
80	GK	ESP	Arnau Tenas (to (Spain) Villarreal)
—	MF	BRA	Gabriel Moscardo (on loan to (Portugal) Braga, previously on loan at Reims)
—	DF	SVK	Milan Škriniar (to (Turkey) Fenerbahçe, previously on loan)
—	DF	FRA	Nordi Mukiele (to (England) Sunderland, previously on loan at (Germany) Bayer Leverkusen)
—	MF	ESP	Marco Asensio (to (Turkey) Fenerbahçe, previously on loan at (England) Aston Villa)
—	FW	FRA	Randal Kolo Muani (on loan to (England) Tottenham Hotspur, previously on loan at (Italy) Juventus)

=== Marseille ===
In:

No.	Pos.	Nation	Player
4	DF	ENG	CJ Egan-Riley (from (England) Burnley)
7	FW	FRA	Neal Maupay (from (England) Everton, previously on loan)
8	MF	ENG	Angel Gomes (from Lille)
14	FW	BRA	Igor Paixão (from (Netherlands) Feyenoord)
17	FW	ENG	Jonathan Rowe (from (England) Norwich City, previously on loan)
21	DF	MAR	Nayef Aguerd (from (England) West Ham United)
22	FW	USA	Timothy Weah (on loan from (Italy) Juventus)
23	MF	DEN	Pierre-Emile Højbjerg (from (England) Tottenham Hotspur, previously on loan)
28	DF	FRA	Benjamin Pavard (on loan from (Italy) Inter)
32	DF	ARG	Facundo Medina (on loan from Lens)
33	DF	ITA	Emerson Palmieri (from (England) West Ham United)
97	FW	GAB	Pierre-Emerick Aubameyang (from (Saudi Arabia) Al Qadsiah)

Out:

No.	Pos.	Nation	Player
3	DF	FRA	Quentin Merlin (to Rennes)
4	DF	ITA	Luiz Felipe (to (Spain) Rayo Vallecano)
11	MF	MAR	Amine Harit (on loan to (Turkey) İstanbul Başakşehir)
13	DF	CAN	Derek Cornelius (on loan to (Scotland) Rangers)
14	FW	CMR	Faris Moumbagna (on loan to (Italy) Cremonese)
17	MF	ENG	Jonathan Rowe (to (Italy) Bologna)
21	MF	FRA	Valentin Rongier (to Rennes)
25	MF	FRA	Adrien Rabiot (to (Italy) Milan)
44	FW	BRA	Luis Henrique (to (Italy) Inter Milan)
77	DF	BIH	Amar Dedić (loan return to (Austria) Red Bull Salzburg)
99	DF	COD	Chancel Mbemba (free agent)
—	MF	CAN	Ismaël Koné (on loan to (Italy) Sassuolo, previously on loan at Rennes)
—	GK	ESP	Pau López (to (Spain) Real Betis, previously on loan at (Mexico) Toluca)
—	GK	CMR	Simon Ngapandouetnbu (to Montpellier, previously on loan at Nîmes)
—	DF	FRA	Samuel Gigot (to (Italy) Lazio, previously on loan)
—	MF	MAR	Azzedine Ounahi (to (Spain) Girona, previously on loan at (Greece) Panathinaikos)

=== Monaco ===
In:

No.	Pos.	Nation	Player
1	GK	FIN	Lukas Hradecky (from (Germany) Bayer Leverkusen)
3	DF	ENG	Eric Dier (from (Germany) Bayern Munich)
8	MF	FRA	Paul Pogba (free agent)
17	MF	BEL	Stanis Idumbo (from (Spain) Sevilla)
31	FW	ESP	Ansu Fati (on loan from (Spain) Barcelona)

Out:

No.	Pos.	Nation	Player
1	GK	POL	Radosław Majecki (on loan to Brest)
8	MF	LBY	Al-Musrati (loan return to (Turkey) Beşiktaş)
17	DF	CIV	Wilfried Singo (to (Turkey) Galatasaray)
37	MF	FRA	Edan Diop (on loan to (Belgium) Cercle Brugge)
42	MF	FRA	Saïmon Bouabré (to (Saudi Arabia) Neom)
88	MF	FRA	Soungoutou Magassa (to (England) West Ham United)
—	DF	FRA	Chrislain Matsima (to (Germany) FC Augsburg, previously on loan)

=== Nice ===
In:

No.	Pos.	Nation	Player
21	FW	SWE	Isak Jansson (from (Austria) Rapid Wien)
23	MF	FRA	Gabin Bernardeau (from Le Mans)
28	DF	SLE	Juma Bah (on loan from (England) Manchester City, previously on loan at Lens)
37	DF	GHA	Kojo Peprah Oppong (from (Sweden) Norrköping)
80	GK	SEN	Yehvann Diouf (from Reims)
90	FW	ESP	Kevin Carlos (from (Switzerland) Basel)
99	MF	GHA	Salis Abdul Samed (from Lens, previously on loan at (England) Sunderland)

Out:

No.	Pos.	Nation	Player
1	GK	POL	Marcin Bułka (to (Saudi Arabia) Neom)
8	MF	DOM	Pablo Rosario (to (Portugal) Porto)
15	FW	GER	Youssoufa Moukoko (loan return to (Germany) Borussia Dortmund)
24	FW	FRA	Gaëtan Laborde (to (Saudi Arabia) Al-Diriyah)
28	MF	FRA	Baptiste Santamaria (loan return to Rennes)
29	FW	CIV	Evann Guessand (to (England) Aston Villa)
45	FW	NGA	Victor Orakpo (on loan to Montpellier)
77	GK	ALG	Teddy Boulhendi (on loan to Bourg-en-Bresse Péronnas)
—	DF	ITA	Mattia Viti (on loan to (Italy) Fiorentina, previously on loan at (Italy) Empoli)
—	MF	ROU	Rareș Ilie (on loan to (Italy) Empoli, previously on loan at (Italy) Catanzaro)
—	MF	GUI	Issiaga Camara (on loan to (Sweden) Brommapojkarna, previously on loan at Dijon)
—	FW	GUI	Aliou Baldé (on loan to (Switzerland) St. Gallen, previously on loan at (Switzerland) Lausanne-Sport)
—	DF	FRA	Jean-Clair Todibo (to (England) West Ham United, previously on loan)
—	DF	MAR	Ayoub Amraoui (to (Qatar) Al Ahli, previously on loan at Martigues)

=== Lille ===
In:

No.	Pos.	Nation	Player
1	GK	TUR	Berke Özer (from (Turkey) Eyüpspor)
3	DF	BEL	Nathan Ngoy (from (Belgium) Standard Liège)
9	FW	FRA	Olivier Giroud (from (United States) Los Angeles FC)
14	MF	NOR	Marius Broholm (from (Norway) Rosenborg)
15	DF	FRA	Romain Perraud (from (Spain) Real Betis)
27	FW	POR	Félix Correia (from (Portugal) Gil Vicente)
29	GK	BEL	Arnaud Bodart (from Metz)

Out:

No.	Pos.	Nation	Player
1	GK	ITA	Vito Mannone (free agent)
5	DF	SWE	Gabriel Gudmundsson (to (England) Leeds United)
8	MF	ENG	Angel Gomes (to Marseille)
9	FW	CAN	Jonathan David (to (Italy) Juventus)
10	MF	FRA	Rémy Cabella (to (Greece) Olympiacos)
14	DF	FRA	Samuel Umtiti (free agent)
18	DF	FRA	Bafodé Diakité (to (England) Bournemouth)
20	DF	NED	Mitchel Bakker (loan return to (Italy) Atalanta)
23	MF	KOS	Edon Zhegrova (to (Italy) Juventus)
24	FW	ENG	Chuba Akpom (loan return to (Netherlands) Ajax)
30	GK	FRA	Lucas Chevalier (to Paris Saint-Germain)
31	DF	BRA	Ismaily (free agent)
—	GK	FRA	Lisandru Olmeta (on loan to Bastia)
—	FW	GUI	Mohamed Bayo (on loan to (Turkey) Gaziantep, previously on loan at (Belgium) Royal Antwerp)
—	FW	POR	Tiago Morais (on loan to (Portugal) Casa Pia, previously on loan at (Portugal) Rio Ave)
—	FW	SRB	Andrej Ilić (to (Germany) Union Berlin, previously on loan)
—	FW	FRA	Alan Virginius (to (Switzerland) Young Boys, previously on loan)

=== Lyon ===
In:

No.	Pos.	Nation	Player
1	GK	SVK	Dominik Greif (from (Spain) Mallorca)
7	MF	CZE	Adam Karabec (on loan from (Czech Republic) Sparta Prague, previously on loan at (Germany) Hamburger SV)
10	MF	CZE	Pavel Šulc (from (Czech Republic) Viktoria Plzeň)
17	FW	POR	Afonso Moreira (from (Portugal) Sporting CP B)
21	DF	NED	Ruben Kluivert (from (Portugal) Casa Pia)
23	MF	ENG	Tyler Morton (from (England) Liverpool)
—	GK	USA	Matt Turner (from (England) Nottingham Forest)

Out:

No.	Pos.	Nation	Player
1	GK	BRA	Lucas Perri (to (England) Leeds United)
4	MF	CIV	Gaëtan Poussin (on loan to (Spain) Zaragoza)
7	MF	FRA	Jordan Veretout (to (Qatar) Al-Arabi)
10	FW	FRA	Alexandre Lacazette (to (Saudi Arabia) Neom)
18	MF	FRA	Rayan Cherki (to (England) Manchester City)
23	MF	ARG	Thiago Almada (loan return to (Brazil) Botafogo)
27	DF	COM	Warmed Omari (loan return to Rennes)
31	MF	SRB	Nemanja Matić (free agent)
55	DF	CRO	Duje Ćaleta-Car (on loan to (Spain) Real Sociedad)
69	FW	GEO	Georges Mikautadze (to (Spain) Villarreal)
—	GK	USA	Matt Turner (on loan to (United States) New England Revolution)
—	GK	FRA	Justin Bengui (on loan to (Belgium) RWDM Brussels, previously on loan at (Serbia) Jedinstvo Ub)
—	DF	BRA	Adryelson (to (United Arab Emirates) Al Wasl, previously on loan at (Belgium) Anderlecht)
—	MF	FRA	Johann Lepenant (to Nantes, previously on loan)
—	FW	ALG	Saïd Benrahma (to (Saudi Arabia) Neom, previously on loan)
—	FW	SWE	Amin Sarr (to (Italy) Hellas Verona, previously on loan)

=== Strasbourg ===
In:

No.	Pos.	Nation	Player
2	DF	IRL	Andrew Omobamidele (from (England) Nottingham Forest, previously on loan)
3	DF	ENG	Ben Chilwell (from (England) Chelsea)
8	MF	POL	Maxi Oyedele (from (Poland) Legia Warsaw)
9	FW	ARG	Joaquín Panichelli (from (Spain) Alavés, previously on loan at (Spain) Mirandés)
16	FW	ECU	Kendry Páez (on loan from (England) Chelsea)
17	MF	FRA	Mathis Amougou (from (England) Chelsea)
21	MF	SEN	Pape Diop (from (Belgium) Zulte Waregem)
23	DF	FRA	Mamadou Sarr (on loan from (England) Chelsea)
24	DF	DEN	Lucas Høgsberg (from (Denmark) Nordsjælland)
27	FW	ENG	Sam Amo-Ameyaw (from (England) Southampton, previously on loan)
32	DF	ARG	Valentín Barco (from (England) Brighton & Hove Albion, previously on loan)
39	GK	BEL	Mike Penders (on loan from (England) Chelsea)
44	DF	FRA	Soumaïla Coulibaly (from (Germany) Borussia Dortmund, previously on loan at Brest)
50	GK	FRA	Stefan Bajic (from (England) Bristol City)
83	MF	POR	Rafael Luís (on loan from (Portugal) Benfica B)
—	DF	ENG	Ishé Samuels-Smith (from (England) Chelsea)

Out:

No.	Pos.	Nation	Player
1	GK	SRB	Đorđe Petrović (loan return to (England) Chelsea)
3	DF	FRA	Thomas Delaine (to Le Havre)
11	FW	CIV	Moïse Sahi Dion (to (Belgium) Dender)
17	MF	SEN	Pape Daouda Diong (on loan to Dunkerque)
19	MF	SEN	Habib Diarra (to (England) Sunderland)
20	MF	COL	Óscar Perea (on loan to (Portugal) AVS)
23	DF	FRA	Mamadou Sarr (to (England) Chelsea)
25	DF	FRA	Yoni Gomis (on loan to (Belgium) Beveren)
26	FW	FRA	Dilane Bakwa (to (England) Nottingham Forest)
33	DF	GUI	Amadou Cissé (on loan to Le Mans)
36	GK	MAR	Alaa Bellaarouch (to (Portugal) Braga)
—	FW	SRB	Miloš Luković (on loan to (Spain) Las Palmas, previously on loan at (Netherlands) Heerenveen)
—	GK	FRA	Robin Risser (to Lens, previously on loan at Red Star)
—	DF	FRA	Steven Baseya (to (Portugal) Alverca, previously on loan at Villefranche)
—	DF	ENG	Ishé Samuels-Smith (to (England) Chelsea)
—	DF	FRA	Marvin Senaya (to Auxerre, previously on loan at (Switzerland) Lausanne-Sport)
—	MF	FRA	Jessy Deminguet (to Metz, previously on loan)
—	FW	MTQ	Jérémy Sebas (to Bastia, previously on loan)
—	FW	CIV	Patrick Ouotro (to Nancy, previously on loan at (Belgium) Seraing)
—	FW	COM	Aboubacar Ali Abdallah (to (Belgium) Francs Borains, previously on loan at (Portugal) Torreense)

=== Lens ===
In:

No.	Pos.	Nation	Player
1	GK	FRA	Régis Gurtner (from Amiens)
6	DF	AUT	Samson Baidoo (from (Austria) Red Bull Salzburg)
8	MF	MLI	Mamadou Sangaré (from (Austria) Rapid Wien)
9	FW	URU	Martín Satriano (from (Italy) Inter Milan, previously on loan)
10	FW	FRA	Florian Thauvin (from (Italy) Udinese)
11	FW	FRA	Odsonne Édouard (from (England) Crystal Palace)
14	DF	FRA	Matthieu Udol (from Metz)
19	FW	SEN	Abdallah Sima (from (England) Brighton & Hove Albion)
23	DF	KSA	Saud Abdulhamid (on loan from (Italy) Roma)
25	FW	SWE	Jeremy Agbonifo (from (Sweden) Häcken, previously on loan)
40	GK	FRA	Robin Risser (from Strasbourg, previously on loan at Red Star)
—	GK	ITA	Mattia Fortin (from (Italy) Padova)

Out:

No.	Pos.	Nation	Player
1	GK	SVN	Denis Petrić (free agent)
8	FW	ANG	M'Bala Nzola (loan return to (Italy) Fiorentina)
14	DF	ARG	Facundo Medina (on loan to Marseille)
16	GK	BFA	Hervé Koffi (on loan to Angers)
18	MF	FRA	Andy Diouf (to (Italy) Inter)
19	FW	CTA	Goduine Koyalipou (on loan to (Spain) Levante)
21	FW	MAR	Anass Zaroury (on loan to (Greece) Panathinaikos)
23	MF	MAR	Neil El Aynaoui (to (Italy) Roma)
26	MF	SEN	Nampalys Mendy (free agent)
27	DF	SLE	Juma Bah (loan return to (England) Manchester City)
30	GK	AUS	Mathew Ryan (free agent)
34	DF	FRA	Tom Pouilly (to Pau)
—	GK	ITA	Mattia Fortin (on loan to (Italy) Padova)
—	GK	COM	Yannick Pandor (on loan to (Belgium) Francs Borains, previously on loan at Boulogne)
—	FW	FRA	Kembo Diliwidi (on loan to Quevilly-Rouen, previously on loan at Le Mans)
—	DF	SEN	Sidi Bane (to (Portugal) AVS, previously on loan at Annecy)
—	DF	AUT	Kevin Danso (to (England) Tottenham Hotspur, previously on loan)
—	DF	POL	Przemysław Frankowski (to (Turkey) Galatasaray, previously on loan)
—	MF	COL	Óscar Cortés (to (Scotland) Rangers, previously on loan)
—	MF	GHA	Salis Abdul Samed (to Nice, previously on loan at (England) Sunderland)

=== Brest ===
In:

No.	Pos.	Nation	Player
1	GK	POL	Radosław Majecki (on loan from Monaco)
4	DF	CIV	Junior Diaz (on loan from Troyes)
19	FW	FRA	Ludovic Ajorque (from (Germany) Mainz 05, previously on loan)

Out:

No.	Pos.	Nation	Player
3	DF	SEN	Abdoulaye Ndiaye (loan return to Troyes)
6	MF	SUI	Edimilson Fernandes (loan return to (Germany) Mainz 05)
17	FW	SEN	Abdallah Sima (loan return to (England) Brighton & Hove Albion)
21	MF	FRA	Romain Faivre (loan return to (England) Bournemouth)
22	DF	MLI	Massadio Haïdara (to (Turkey) Kocaelispor)
23	DF	FRA	Jordan Amavi (free agent)
26	MF	POR	Mathias Pereira Lage (to (Germany) FC St. Pauli)
28	MF	FRA	Jonas Martin (free agent)
34	FW	MAR	Ibrahim Salah (loan return to Rennes)
40	GK	NED	Marco Bizot (to (England) Aston Villa)
44	DF	FRA	Soumaïla Coulibaly (loan return to (Germany) Borussia Dortmund)
45	MF	FRA	Mahdi Camara (to Rennes)
—	DF	FRA	Lilian Brassier (to Rennes, previously on loan)
—	MF	ENG	Karamoko Dembélé (to (England) Queens Park Rangers, previously on loan)

=== Toulouse ===
In:

No.	Pos.	Nation	Player
7	FW	ARG	Julián Vignolo (from (Argentina) Racing de Córdoba)
11	FW	ARG	Santiago Hidalgo (from (Argentina) Independiente)
17	MF	GHA	Abu Francis (from (Belgium) Cercle Brugge)
77	MF	SVK	Mário Sauer (from (Slovakia) Žilina)

Out:

No.	Pos.	Nation	Player
6	DF	ROU	Ümit Akdağ (loan return to (Turkey) Alanyaspor)
7	FW	MAR	Zakaria Aboukhlal (to (Italy) Torino)
8	MF	SUI	Vincent Sierro (to (Saudi Arabia) Al-Shabab)
13	FW	NOR	Joshua King (to (Saudi Arabia) Al-Khaleej)
17	DF	CHI	Gabriel Suazo (to (Spain) Sevilla)
21	MF	SVN	Miha Zajc (loan return to (Turkey) Fenerbahçe)
29	DF	FRA	Jaydee Canvot (to (England) Crystal Palace)
37	MF	ALG	Edhy Zuliani (on loan to Pau)
40	GK	FRA	Justin Lacombe (to Valenciennes)
60	GK	FRA	Mathys Niflore (on loan to Dunkerque)
80	FW	GAB	Shavy Babicka (to (Serbia) Red Star Belgrade)
—	FW	BIH	Said Hamulić (on loan to (Greece) Volos, previously on loan at (Poland) Widzew Łódź)
—	FW	NED	Ibrahim Cissoko (on loan to (England) Bolton Wanderers, previously on loan at (England) Sheffield Wednesday)
—	MF	ESP	César Gelabert (to (Spain) Sporting Gijón, previously on loan)

=== Auxerre ===
In:

No.	Pos.	Nation	Player
4	DF	CHI	Francisco Sierralta (from (England) Watford)
7	FW	GLP	Josué Casimir (from Le Havre)
17	MF	MAR	Oussama El Azzouzi (on loan from (Italy) Bologna)
19	FW	CMR	Danny Namaso (on loan from (Portugal) Porto)
23	FW	GHA	Ibrahim Osman (on loan from (England) Brighton & Hove Albion, previously on loan at (Netherlands) Feyenoord)
27	DF	FRA	Lamine Sy (from Caen)
29	DF	FRA	Marvin Senaya (from Strasbourg, previously on loan at (Switzerland) Lausanne-Sport)

Out:

No.	Pos.	Nation	Player
4	DF	BRA	Jubal (to (Russia) Krasnodar)
10	FW	FRA	Gaëtan Perrin (to (Russia) Krasnodar)
19	FW	FRA	Florian Ayé (to (Switzerland) Servette)
24	DF	CIV	Ange-Loïc N'Gatta (to Grenoble)
37	GK	FRA	Raphaël Adicéam (to Les Sables VF)
77	FW	CIV	Aristide Zossou (on loan to Dunkerque)
80	MF	FRA	Han-Noah Massengo (loan return to (England) Burnley)

=== Rennes ===
In:

No.	Pos.	Nation	Player
5	DF	FRA	Lilian Brassier (from Brest, previously on loan)
21	MF	FRA	Valentin Rongier (from Marseille)
26	DF	FRA	Quentin Merlin (from Marseille)
45	MF	FRA	Mahdi Camara (from Brest)
95	DF	POL	Przemysław Frankowski (on loan from (Turkey) Galatasaray)

Out:

No.	Pos.	Nation	Player
3	DF	FRA	Adrien Truffert (to (England) Bournemouth)
4	DF	CMR	Christopher Wooh (to (Russia) Spartak Moscow)
6	MF	NED	Azor Matusiwa (to (England) Ipswich Town)
7	FW	JPN	Kyōgo Furuhashi (to (England) Birmingham City)
9	FW	FRA	Arnaud Kalimuendo (to (England) Nottingham Forest)
15	DF	SEN	Mikayil Faye (on loan to (Italy) Cremonese)
17	MF	WAL	Jordan James (on loan to (England) Leicester City)
19	FW	BEL	Kazeem Olaigbe (to (Turkey) Trabzonspor)
22	DF	FRA	Lorenz Assignon (to (Germany) VfB Stuttgart)
80	GK	TUR	Doğan Alemdar (to (Turkey) İstanbul Başakşehir)
90	MF	CAN	Ismaël Koné (loan return to Marseille)
—	DF	FRA	Jonathan Do Marcolino (on loan to Bourg-Péronnas)
—	DF	MAR	Mohamed Jaouab (to (Spain) Real Valladolid, previously on loan at Amiens)
—	DF	COM	Warmed Omari (on loan to (Germany) Hamburger SV, previously on loan at Lyon)
—	DF	NOR	Leo Skiri Østigård (on loan to (Italy) Genoa, previously on loan at (Germany) TSG Hoffenheim)
—	MF	DEN	Albert Grønbæk (on loan to (Italy) Genoa, previously on loan at (England) Southampton)
—	MF	FRA	Baptiste Santamaria (to (Spain) Valencia, previously on loan at Nice)
—	FW	GAB	Alan Do Marcolino (to (Portugal) Lusitânia, previously on loan at Orléans)
—	FW	DEN	Henrik Meister (to (Italy) Pisa, previously on loan)
—	FW	MLI	Wilson Samaké (to (Turkey) Bandırmaspor)
—	FW	TUR	Bertuğ Yıldırım (to (Turkey) İstanbul Başakşehir, previously on loan at to (Spain) Getafe)

=== Nantes ===
In:

No.	Pos.	Nation	Player
3	DF	FRA	Nicolas Cozza (reloan from (Germany) VfL Wolfsburg)
5	MF	KOR	Kwon Hyeok-kyu (from (Scotland) Celtic, previously on loan at (Scotland) Hibernian)
6	DF	NGA	Chidozie Awaziem (from (United States) Colorado Rapids)
7	MF	KOR	Hong Hyun-seok (on loan from (Germany) Mainz 05)
8	MF	FRA	Johann Lepenant (from Lyon, previously on loan)
14	FW	MLI	Amady Camara (on loan from (Austria) Sturm Graz)
15	FW	SWE	Mayckel Lahdo (on loan from (Netherlands) AZ)
19	FW	MAR	Youssef El-Arabi (from (Cyprus) APOEL)
26	DF	SRB	Uroš Radaković (from (Turkey) Sivasspor)
50	GK	FRA	Alexis Mirbach (from Metz)

Out:

No.	Pos.	Nation	Player
1	GK	CIV	Alban Lafont (on loan to (Greece) Panathinaikos)
4	DF	FRA	Nicolas Pallois (to Reims)
5	MF	ESP	Pedro Chirivella (to (Greece) Panathinaikos)
6	MF	BRA	Douglas Augusto (to (Russia) Krasnodar)
11	MF	GLP	Marcus Coco (released)
21	DF	CMR	Jean-Charles Castelletto (to (Qatar) Al-Duhail)
25	MF	FRA	Florent Mollet (released)
27	FW	NGA	Moses Simon (to Paris FC)
44	DF	FRA	Nathan Zézé (to (Saudi Arabia) Neom)
—	MF	SEN	Lamine Diack (on loan to (Switzerland) Sion, previously on loan at (Turkey) Hatayspor)
—	MF	FRA	Malang Gomes (on loan to Le Mans)

=== Angers ===
In:

No.	Pos.	Nation	Player
12	GK	BFA	Hervé Koffi (on loan from Lens)
—	MF	FRA	Louis Mouton (from Saint-Étienne)

Out:

No.	Pos.	Nation	Player
4	DF	BIH	Halid Šabanović (released)
6	MF	CIV	Jean-Eudes Aholou (released)
7	FW	SEN	Ibrahima Niane (released)
12	MF	FRA	Zinédine Ould Khaled (released)
20	MF	ALG	Zinedine Ferhat (released)
28	FW	ALG	Farid El Melali (released)
38	MF	FRA	Enzo Caumont (released)
99	FW	SEN	Bamba Dieng (loan return to Lorient)

=== Le Havre ===
In:

No.	Pos.	Nation	Player
5	DF	JPN	Ayumu Seko (from (Switzerland) Grasshopper)
9	FW	CHI	Damián Pizarro (on loan from (Italy) Udinese)
10	FW	SUI	Felix Mambimbi (from (Switzerland) St. Gallen)
11	MF	FRA	Godson Kyeremeh (from Caen)
13	DF	MLI	Fodé Doucouré (from Red Star)
21	MF	DEN	Younes Namli (from (Netherlands) PEC Zwolle)
23	DF	FRA	Thomas Delaine (from Strasbourg)
70	FW	TAN	Mbwana Samatta (from (Greece) PAOK)
77	GK	COD	Lionel Mpasi (from Rodez)
99	GK	SEN	Mory Diaw (from Clermont, previously on loan at Rodez)

Out:

No.	Pos.	Nation	Player
1	GK	FRA	Mathieu Gorgelin (released)
9	FW	COD	Yann Kitala (released)
10	FW	GLP	Josué Casimir (to Auxerre)
12	MF	FRA	Mathéo Bodmer (on loan to Bourg-Péronnas)
14	MF	RUS	Daler Kuzyayev (released)
21	MF	FRA	Antoine Joujou (loan return to (Italy) Parma)
23	DF	FRA	Junior Mwanga (loan return to Strasbourg)
26	MF	FRA	Alois Confais (released)
28	FW	GHA	André Ayew (released)
30	GK	FRA	Arthur Desmas (released)
32	DF	FRA	Timothée Pembélé (loan return to (England) Sunderland)
34	MF	FRA	Mahamadou Diawara (loan return to Lyon)
46	FW	MAR	Ilyes Housni (loan return to Paris Saint-Germain)
97	DF	SEN	Fodé Ballo-Touré (released)
99	FW	EGY	Ahmed Hassan (released)
—	DF	SEN	Aliou Thiaré (to (Ukraine) Dynamo Kyiv, previously on loan at Nancy)
—	FW	GUI	Kandet Diawara (to (Germany) 1. FC Magdeburg, previously on loan at Pau)

=== Lorient ===
In:

No.	Pos.	Nation	Player
8	MF	GLP	Noah Cadiou (from Rodez)
21	GK	SEN	Bingourou Kamara (from Pau)
25	DF	SEN	Abdoulaye Faye (on loan from (Germany) Bayer Leverkusen)
43	DF	BFA	Arsène Kouassi (from Ajaccio)
—	FW	SEN	Bamba Dieng (loan return from Angers)
—	DF	TOG	Izak Akakpo (from Dijon)

Out:

No.	Pos.	Nation	Player
5	DF	SEN	Formose Mendy (on loan to (England) Watford)
7	FW	CIV	Stéphane Diarra (to (Portugal) Alverca)
15	DF	FRA	Julien Laporte (to Montpellier)
21	MF	FRA	Julien Ponceau (to (Spain) Real Valladolid)
60	DF	FRA	Enzo Genton (on loan to Rouen)
61	FW	FRA	Jérémy Hatchi (on loan to Guingamp)
66	DF	NGA	Isaac James (to (Portugal) Alverca)
99	FW	SEN	Bassirou N'Diaye (to Cannes)
—	DF	GUI	Dembo Sylla (on loan to Red Star, previously on loan at (Belgium) Dender)
—	FW	FRA	Yoann Cathline (to (Netherlands) Utrecht, previously on loan)

=== Paris FC ===
In:

No.	Pos.	Nation	Player
6	DF	BRA	Otávio (from (Portugal) Porto)
9	FW	FRA	Willem Geubbels (from (Switzerland) St. Gallen)
14	DF	MLI	Hamari Traoré (from (Spain) Real Sociedad)
19	DF	FRA	Nhoa Sangui (from Reims)
27	FW	NGA	Moses Simon (from Nantes)
35	GK	GER	Kevin Trapp (from (Germany) Eintracht Frankfurt)

Out:

No.	Pos.	Nation	Player
—	FW	SUI	Josias Lukembila (to (Switzerland) Sion, previously on loan at (Switzerland) Winterthur)

=== Metz ===
In:

No.	Pos.	Nation	Player
1	GK	DEN	Jonathan Fischer (from (Norway) Fredrikstad)
4	DF	GAB	Urie-Michel Mboula (from (Turkey) Şanlıurfaspor, previously on loan)
5	MF	CIV	Jean-Philippe Gbamin (from (Switzerland) Zürich)
7	MF	GEO	Giorgi Tsitaishvili (on loan from (Ukraine) Dynamo Kyiv)
8	MF	MLI	Boubacar Traoré (on loan from (England) Wolverhampton Wanderers)
9	FW	GEO	Giorgi Abuashvili (on loan from (Georgia (country)) Kolkheti Poti)
20	MF	FRA	Jessy Deminguet (from Strasbourg, previously on loan)
27	DF	BEL	Yannis Lawson (from (Belgium) RFC Seraing)

Out:

No.	Pos.	Nation	Player
3	DF	FRA	Matthieu Udol (to Lens)
7	FW	SEN	Papa Amadou Diallo (to (England) Norwich City)
8	DF	CIV	Ismaël Traoré (released)
15	DF	SEN	Aboubacar Lô (to Amiens)
16	GK	ALG	Alexandre Oukidja (released)
18	FW	SEN	Idrissa Gueye (on loan to (Italy) Udinese)
29	GK	BEL	Arnaud Bodart (to Lille)
36	FW	GAM	Ablie Jallow (to (Switzerland) Servette)
—	GK	SEN	Ousmane Ba (released, previously on loan at (Belgium) RFC Seraing)
—	GK	FRA	Alexis Mirbach (to Nantes)
—	DF	GNB	Fali Candé (to (Italy) Venezia, previously on loan)
—	MF	FRA	Arthur Atta (to (Italy) Udinese, previously on loan)
—	MF	FRA	Wassim Bahri (to (Belgium) RFC Seraing)
—	MF	MAR	Othmane Chraibi (released)
—	FW	SEN	Pape Moussa Fall (on loan to (Belgium) RAAL La Louvière)
—	FW	FRA	Édouard Soumah-Abbad (on loan to (Belgium) RFC Seraing)
—	FW	GHA	Benjamin Tetteh (to (Slovenia) Maribor, previously on loan)

== Ligue 2 ==
Note: Flags indicate national team as has been defined under FIFA eligibility rules. Players may hold more than one non-FIFA nationality.

=== Reims ===
In:

No.	Pos.	Nation	Player
5	DF	FRA	Nicolas Pallois (from Nantes)
77	FW	BEL	Norman Bassette (on loan from (England) Coventry City)

Out:

No.	Pos.	Nation	Player
19	MF	BRA	Gabriel Moscardo (loan return to Paris Saint-Germain)
19	FW	USA	Jordan Siebatcheu (on loan to (Portugal) Tondela)
21	DF	CIV	Cédric Kipré (on loan to (England) Ipswich Town)
55	DF	FRA	Nhoa Sangui (to Paris FC)
74	FW	MLI	Niama Pape Sissoko (to (Hungary) Debrecen)
94	GK	SEN	Yehvann Diouf (to Nice)
—	MF	ALG	Keryane Mansouri (to (Belgium) Beerschot)

=== Saint-Étienne ===
In:

No.	Pos.	Nation	Player
7	FW	FRA	Irvin Cardona (from (Germany) FC Augsburg, previously on loan)
15	DF	POR	Chico Lamba (from (Portugal) Arouca)

Out:

No.	Pos.	Nation	Player
6	MF	MAR	Benjamin Bouchouari (to (Turkey) Trabzonspor)
9	FW	MLI	Ibrahim Sissoko (to (Germany) VfL Bochum)
14	MF	FRA	Louis Mouton (to Angers)
17	DF	FRA	Pierre Cornud (to (Israel) Maccabi Haifa)
19	DF	FRA	Léo Pétrot (to (Spain) Elche)
25	FW	SEN	Ibrahima Wadji (to (Azerbaijan) Turan Tovuz)
26	MF	FRA	Lamine Fomba (to (Switzerland) Servette)
—	DF	FRA	Beres Owusu (on loan to (Austria) Grazer AK, previously on loan at Quevilly-Rouen)

=== Montpellier ===
In:

No.	Pos.	Nation	Player
3	DF	MAR	Naoufel El Hannach (on loan from Paris Saint-Germain)
7	FW	COD	Nathanaël Mbuku (on loan from (Germany) FC Augsburg)
14	FW	NGA	Victor Orakpo (on loan from Nice)
15	DF	FRA	Julien Laporte (from Lorient)
31	GK	CMR	Simon Ngapandouetnbu (from Marseille, previously on loan at Nîmes)

Out:

No.	Pos.	Nation	Player
12	MF	FRA	Jordan Ferri (to (Italy) Sampdoria)
14	FW	MAR	Othmane Maamma (to (England) Watford)
45	MF	SRB	Stefan Džodić (to (Spain) Almería)
70	FW	FRA	Tanguy Coulibaly (to (Turkey) Samsunspor)
—	MF	FRA	Abdoulaye Camara (to (Italy) Udinese)

=== Dunkerque ===
In:

No.	Pos.	Nation	Player
6	MF	SEN	Pape Daouda Diong (on loan from Strasbourg)
16	MF	ESP	Íñigo Eguaras (from (Slovenia) Celje)
60	GK	FRA	Mathys Niflore (on loan from Toulouse)
77	FW	CIV	Aristide Zossou (on loan from Auxerre)

Out:

No.	Pos.	Nation	Player
8	FW	FRA	Maxence Rivera (to (Netherlands) Heerenveen)
11	MF	ROU	Alexi Pitu (to (Denmark) Vejle)
22	MF	FIN	Naatan Skyttä (to (Germany) 1. FC Kaiserslautern)

=== Guingamp ===
In:

No.	Pos.	Nation	Player
—	DF	CIV	Erwin Koffi (from (Azerbaijan) Neftçi)
—	FW	FRA	Jérémy Hatchi (on loan from Lorient)

Out:

No.	Pos.	Nation	Player
6	DF	FRA	Lenny Vallier (to (Portugal) Nacional)
9	FW	MTQ	Brighton Labeau (to (Switzerland) Thun)
17	FW	FRA	Jacques Siwe (to (Russia) Rubin Kazan)
21	MF	FRA	Rayan Ghrieb (to (Germany) 1. FC Magdeburg)
26	DF	FRA	Matthis Riou (to (Belgium) RAAL La Louvière)
29	FW	ESP	Júnior Mendes (to (Portugal) Alverca)
32	FW	FRA	Sabri Guendouz (to (Belgium) Beerschot)

=== Annecy ===
In:

No.	Pos.	Nation	Player

Out:

No.	Pos.	Nation	Player
15	DF	SEN	Sidi Bane (loan return to Lens, later sold to (Portugal) AVS)
—	FW	FRA	Samuel Ntamack (to (Spain) Huesca, previously on loan at (Belgium) Lokeren)

=== Laval ===
In:

No.	Pos.	Nation	Player

Out:

No.	Pos.	Nation	Player
17	DF	FRA	William Kokolo (to (Germany) Hannover 96)
20	DF	TUN	Amin Cherni (to (Turkey) Göztepe)
21	DF	CIV	Owen Kouassi (to (Italy) Lecce)

=== Bastia ===
In:

No.	Pos.	Nation	Player
1	GK	FRA	Lisandru Olmeta (on loan from Lille)
14	FW	MTQ	Jérémy Sebas (from Strasbourg, previously on loan)

Out:

No.	Pos.	Nation	Player
2	MF	CIV	Christ Inao Oulaï (to (Turkey) Trabzonspor)
11	FW	FRA	Lamine Cissé (to (England) Stoke City)
—	DF	FRA	Yllan Okou (to (Belgium) RAAL La Louvière, previously on loan at (Italy) Hellas Verona)

=== Grenoble ===
In:

No.	Pos.	Nation	Player
—	DF	CIV	Ange-Loïc N'Gatta (from Auxerre)

Out:

No.	Pos.	Nation	Player
28	MF	BEN	Junior Olaitan (to (Turkey) Göztepe)
77	DF	SEN	Arial Mendy (to (Israel) Beitar Jerusalem)

=== Troyes ===
In:

No.	Pos.	Nation	Player

Out:

No.	Pos.	Nation	Player
4	DF	CIV	Junior Diaz (on loan to Brest)
11	FW	COM	Rafiki Saïd (to (Belgium) Standard Liège)
21	FW	BFA	Cyriaque Irié (to (Germany) SC Freiburg)
27	FW	FRA	Kyliane Dong (to (Germany) FC Augsburg)
42	MF	CIV	Abdoulaye Kanté (to (England) Middlesbrough)
—	DF	POR	Abdu Conté (to (Portugal) Casa Pia, previously on loan at (Switzerland) Young Boys)
—	DF	SEN	Abdoulaye Ndiaye (to (Italy) Parma, previously on loan at Brest)
—	MF	BRA	Metinho (to (Switzerland) Basel, previously on loan)
—	FW	SWE	Amar Fatah (on loan to (Scotland) Dundee United, previously on loan at (Netherlands) Willem II)

=== Amiens ===
In:

No.	Pos.	Nation	Player
9	FW	SVN	Jan Mlakar (on loan from (Italy) Pisa, previously on loan at (Croatia) Hajduk Split)
25	FW	ENG	Arvin Appiah (on loan from (Spain) Almería, previously on loan at (Portugal) Nacional)
28	DF	SEN	Aboubacar Lô (from Metz)

Out:

No.	Pos.	Nation	Player
1	GK	FRA	Régis Gurtner (to Lens)
13	DF	MAR	Mohamed Jaouab (loan return to Rennes, later sold to (Spain) Real Valladolid)

=== Pau ===
In:

No.	Pos.	Nation	Player
2	DF	FRA	Tom Pouilly (from Lens)
22	GK	FRA	Noah Raveyre (from (Italy) Milan)
87	MF	ALG	Edhy Zuliani (on loan from Toulouse)
—	FW	MAR	Omar Sadik (on loan from (Spain) Espanyol)

Out:

No.	Pos.	Nation	Player
1	GK	SEN	Bingourou Kamara (to Lorient)
6	MF	MTN	Oumar Ngom (to (Portugal) Estrela da Amadora)
18	FW	GUI	Kandet Diawara (loan return to Le Havre, later sold to (Germany) 1. FC Magdeburg)
—	FW	FRA	Yonis Njoh (to (Denmark) Viborg, previously on loan)

=== Rodez ===
In:

No.	Pos.	Nation	Player
—	GK	FRA	Quentin Braat (from (Spain) Real Oviedo)
—	GK	FRA	Lucas Margueron (from (Belgium) RFC Seraing)
—	FW	FRA	Hermann Tebily (from (Switzerland) Thun)

Out:

No.	Pos.	Nation	Player
5	MF	GLP	Noah Cadiou (to Lorient)
10	MF	FRA	Waniss Taïbi (to (Germany) Hannover 96)
16	GK	COD	Lionel Mpasi (to Le Havre)
19	MF	FRA	Derek Mazou-Sacko (to (England) Millwall)
99	GK	SEN	Mory Diaw (loan return to Clermont, later sold to Le Havre)

=== Red Star ===
In:

No.	Pos.	Nation	Player
16	GK	FRA	Gaëtan Poussin (from (Spain) Zaragoza)
22	DF	GUI	Dembo Sylla (on loan from Lorient, previously on loan at (Belgium) Dender)

Out:

No.	Pos.	Nation	Player
13	DF	MLI	Fodé Doucouré (to Le Havre)
40	GK	FRA	Robin Risser (loan return to Strasbourg)

=== Clermont ===
In:

No.	Pos.	Nation	Player
—	DF	BEL	Maximiliano Caufriez (loan return from (Austria) Red Bull Salzburg)

Out:

No.	Pos.	Nation	Player
6	MF	MLI	Habib Keïta (on loan to (Turkey) Kocaelispor)
7	MF	FRA	Yohann Magnin (to (Bulgaria) CSKA 1948)
31	DF	SEN	Baïla Diallo (to (Spain) Granada)
—	GK	SEN	Mory Diaw (to Le Havre, previously on loan at Rodez)
—	MF	FRA	Yann Massombo (to (Austria) SCR Altach, previously on loan at (Switzerland) Biel-Bienne)

=== Nancy ===
In:

No.	Pos.	Nation	Player
29	FW	CIV	Patrick Ouotro (from Strasbourg, previously on loan at (Belgium) Seraing)

Out:

No.	Pos.	Nation	Player
25	DF	SEN	Aliou Thiaré (loan return to Le Havre, later sold to (Ukraine) Dynamo Kyiv)

=== Le Mans ===
In:

No.	Pos.	Nation	Player
4	DF	GUI	Amadou Cissé (on loan from Strasbourg)
7	MF	FRA	Malang Gomes (on loan to Nantes)

Out:

No.	Pos.	Nation	Player
20	FW	FRA	Kembo Diliwidi (loan return to Lens)
33	MF	FRA	Gabin Bernardeau (to Nice)
—	FW	COD	Arnold Vula (to (Belgium) Beerschot)

=== Boulogne ===
In:

No.	Pos.	Nation	Player

Out:

No.	Pos.	Nation	Player
16	GK	COM	Yannick Pandor (loan return to Lens)

== See also ==
- 2025–26 Ligue 1
- 2025–26 Ligue 2
