= 2024–25 Stade Brestois 29 season =

Football club season

Stade Brestois 29
2024–25 season
- President: Denis Le Saint
- Head coach: Éric Roy
- Stadium: Stade Francis-Le Blé; Stade de Roudourou (European matches)
- Ligue 1: 9th
- Coupe de France: Quarter-finals
- UEFA Champions League: Knockout phase play-offs
- Top goalscorer: League: Ludovic Ajorque (13); All: Ludovic Ajorque (14)
- Average home league attendance: 14,655
Home colours	Away colours	Third colours

The 2024–25 season was the 75th season in the history of Stade Brestois 29, and the club's sixth consecutive season in Ligue 1. In addition to the domestic league, the club participated in the Coupe de France and the UEFA Champions League, making a debut in the latter competition.

== Players ==
=== First-team squad ===
As of 24 January 2025

Note: Flags indicate national team as defined under FIFA eligibility rules; some limited exceptions apply. Players may hold more than one non-FIFA nationality.

No.	Pos.	Nation	Player
2	DF	FRA	Bradley Locko
3	DF	SEN	Abdoulaye Ndiaye (on loan from Troyes)
5	DF	FRA	Brendan Chardonnet (captain)
6	DF	SUI	Edimilson Fernandes (on loan from Mainz 05)
7	DF	FRA	Kenny Lala
8	MF	FRA	Hugo Magnetti
9	MF	MLI	Kamory Doumbia
10	MF	FRA	Romain Del Castillo
12	DF	CIV	Luck Zogbé
14	FW	GBS	Mama Baldé
17	FW	SEN	Abdallah Sima (on loan from Brighton & Hove Albion)
18	DF	FRA	Justin Bourgault
19	FW	FRA	Ludovic Ajorque (on loan from Mainz 05)

No.	Pos.	Nation	Player
20	MF	FRA	Pierre Lees-Melou (vice-captain)
21	MF	FRA	Romain Faivre (on loan from Bournemouth)
22	DF	MLI	Massadio Haïdara
23	DF	FRA	Jordan Amavi
25	DF	FRA	Julien Le Cardinal
26	MF	POR	Mathias Pereira Lage
28	MF	FRA	Jonas Martin
30	GK	FRA	Grégoire Coudert
34	FW	MAR	Ibrahim Salah (on loan from Rennes)
40	GK	NED	Marco Bizot
44	DF	FRA	Soumaïla Coulibaly (on loan from Borussia Dortmund)
45	MF	FRA	Mahdi Camara
50	GK	IRL	Noah Jauny

=== Out on loan ===
Note: Flags indicate national team as defined under FIFA eligibility rules; some limited exceptions apply. Players may hold more than one non-FIFA nationality.

No.	Pos.	Nation	Player
—	DF	FRA	Lilian Brassier (at Rennes until 30 June 2025)
—	MF	ENG	Karamoko Dembélé (at Queens Park Rangers until 30 June 2025)

No.	Pos.	Nation	Player
—	MF	FRA	Hianga'a Mbock (at Red Star until 30 June 2025)
—	FW	FRA	Axel Camblan (at Valenciennes until 30 June 2025)

== Transfers ==
=== In ===
Pos.	Player	Transferred from	Fee	Date	Source
DF	(France) Julien Le Cardinal	(France) Lens	€1.7 million	1 July 2024	
DF	(Senegal) Abdoulaye Ndiaye	(France) Troyes	Loan (Note: Includes an option to sign permanently for €8 million)	24 July 2024	
FW	(France) Ludovic Ajorque	(Germany) Mainz 05	Loan	25 July 2024	
DF	(France) Jordan Amavi	(France) Marseille	Free	31 July 2024	
MF	(France) Romain Faivre	(England) Bournemouth	Loan	16 August 2024	
FW	(Senegal) Abdallah Sima	(England) Brighton & Hove Albion	Loan	21 August 2024	
DF	(France) Soumaïla Coulibaly	(Germany) Borussia Dortmund	Loan	29 August 2024	
FW	(Morocco) Ibrahim Salah	(France) Rennes	Loan (Note: Includes an option to sign permanently)	30 August 2024	
DF	(Mali) Massadio Haïdara	(France) Lens	Free	30 August 2024	
DF	(Switzerland) Edimilson Fernandes	(Germany) Mainz 05	Loan	30 August 2024	
FW	(Guinea-Bissau) Mama Baldé	(France) Lyon	€4.5 million (Note: Up to €2.4 million in bonuses)	30 August 2024	
MF	(Mali) Kamory Doumbia	(France) Reims	€4 million	30 August 2024	
DF	(France) Justin Bourgault	(France) Concarneau	Free	24 January 2025	

=== Out ===
Pos.	Player	Transferred to	Fee	Date	Source
DF	(France) Jordan Amavi	(France) Marseille	End of loan	1 July 2024	
DF	(France) Antonin Cartillier	(France) Monaco	End of loan	1 July 2024	
MF	(Mali) Kamory Doumbia	(France) Reims	End of loan	1 July 2024	
FW	(Algeria) Billal Brahimi	(France) Nice	End of loan	1 July 2024	
FW	(Uruguay) Martín Satriano	(Italy) Inter Milan	End of loan	1 July 2024	
GK	(France) Yan Marillat	Released	Free	1 July 2024	
MF	(France) Adrien Lebeau	Released (Note: On 2 July 2024, Lebeau signed for Hansa Rostock)	Free	1 July 2024	
FW	(Benin) Steve Mounié	Released (Note: On 5 July 2024, Mounié signed for FC Augsburg)	Free	1 July 2024	
DF	(France) Lilian Brassier	(France) Marseille	Loan (Note: Includes an option to sign permanently for €12 million)	3 July 2024	
FW	(Guadeloupe) Taïryk Arconte	(France) Pau	€0.6 million (Note: Bonuses included)	30 July 2024	
DF	(France) Josué Escartin	(France) Red Star	Free	11 August 2024	
MF	(England) Karamoko Dembélé	(England) Queens Park Rangers	Loan	13 August 2024	
DF	(Morocco) Achraf Dari	(Egypt) Al Ahly	€1.8 million	28 August 2024	
FW	(France) Jérémy Le Douaron	(Italy) Palermo	€4 million	30 August 2024	
MF	(France) Hianga'a Mbock	(France) Red Star	Loan	30 August 2024	
DF	(France) Lilian Brassier	(France) Rennes	Loan (Note: Includes an option to sign permanently for €12 million)	31 January 2025	

== Friendlies ==
=== Pre-season ===
Brest announced the initial pre-season schedule on 4 June 2024.

12 July 2024 Friendly	Brest (France)	2–0	(France) Avranches	Cléder
18:00 CEST (UTC+2)	Le Douaron 27'; Arconte 90+3' (pen.)

20 July 2024 Friendly	Lorient (France)	1–1	(France) Brest	Inzinzac-Lochrist
17:00 CEST (UTC+2)	Yongwa (yellow card) 55'; Mouyokolo 78'; Innocent (yellow card) 81' (yellow-red card) 83'		Martin (yellow card) 28'; Camara (yellow card) 38'; Le Cardinal (yellow card) 43'; Le Douaron 45+2'; Dari (red card) 82'	Stadium: Stade de Mané-Braz

24 July 2024 Friendly	Brest (France)	0–1	(France) Laval	Dinan
18:00 CEST (UTC+2)

31 July 2024 Friendly	Napoli (Italy)	1–0	(France) Brest	Castel di Sangro, Italy
20:00 CEST (UTC+2)	Raspadori 42'			Stadium: Stadio Teofilo Patini; Referee: Alberto Ruben Arena (Italy)

3 August 2024 Friendly	Juventus (Italy)	2–2	(France) Brest	Pescara, Italy
21:00 CEST (UTC+2)	Vlahović 58' (pen.); Danilo 71'		Camara 51'; Camblan 83'	Stadium: Stadio Adriatico; Attendance: 22,000; Referee: Rosario Abisso (Italy)

10 August 2024 Sela Cup	Newcastle United (England)	1–0	(France) Brest	Newcastle upon Tyne, England
16:00 BST (UTC+1)	Barnes 15'			Stadium: St James' Park

== Competitions ==
=== Overall record ===
Competition	First match	Last match	Starting round	Final position	Record							
Competition	First match	Last match	Starting round	Final position	Pld	W	D	L	GF	GA	GD	Win %
Ligue 1	17 August 2024	17 May 2025	Matchday 1	9th	34	15	5	14	52	59	−7	44.12
Coupe de France	21 December 2024	26 February 2025	Round of 64	Quarter-finals	4	3	0	1	7	5	+2	75.00
UEFA Champions League	19 September 2024	19 February 2025	League phase	Knockout phase play-offs	10	4	1	5	10	21	−11	40.00
Total					48	22	6	20	69	85	−16	45.83

Source: Soccerway

=== Ligue 1 ===
==== League table ====
Pos	Team	Pld	W	D	L	GF	GA	GD	Pts	Qualification or relegation
7	Strasbourg	34	16	9	9	56	44	+12	57	Qualification for the Conference League play-off round (Note: Since the 2024–25 Coupe de France winners, Paris Saint-Germain, qualified for the Champions League via league position, the Europa League berth awarded to the cup winners was passed to the sixth-placed team and the Conference League berth was passed to the seventh-placed team.)
8	Lens	34	15	7	12	42	39	+3	52	
9	Brest	34	15	5	14	52	59	−7	50	
10	Toulouse	34	11	9	14	44	43	+1	42	
11	Auxerre	34	11	9	14	48	51	−3	42	

Source: Ligue 1
Rules for classification: 1) Points; 2) Goal difference; 3) Head-to-head points; 4) Head-to-head goal difference; 5) Head-to-head goals scored; 6) Head-to-head away goals scored; 7) Goals scored; 8) Away goals scored; 9) Fair-play points (Note: Head-to-head record is used only after all the matches between the teams in question have been played).

==== Results summary ====
Overall								Home						Away					
Pld	W	D	L	GF	GA	GD	Pts	W	D	L	GF	GA	GD	W	D	L	GF	GA	GD
34	15	5	14	52	59	−7	50	10	3	4	31	21	+10	5	2	10	21	38	−17

Source: Ligue 1

==== Results by round ====
Round	1	2	3	4	5	6	7	8	9	10	11	12	13	14	15	16	17	18	19	20	21	22	23	24	25	26	27	28	29	30	31	32	33	34
Ground	H	A	H	A	H	A	H	H	A	H	A	A	H	A	H	A	H	A	A	H	A	H	A	A	H	H	A	H	A	H	A	H	H	A
Result	L	L	W	L	W	L	W	D	W	L	L	L	W	L	W	L	W	W	W	L	W	D	D	L	W	D	W	W	D	L	L	W	W	L
Position	18	18	12	14	11	13	11	11	10	11	12	12	11	11	11	12	11	9	8	8	8	9	9	10	9	9	8	8	8	9	9	9	8	9

Source: Ligue 1
A = Away; H = Home; W = Win; D = Draw; L = Loss

==== Matches ====
The league schedule was released on 21 June 2024.

17 August 2024 1	Brest	1–5	Marseille	Brest
17:00 CEST (UTC+2)	Del Castillo (penalty missed) 9'; Lage (yellow card) 16'; Martin (yellow card) 30'; Lala (yellow card) 45+1'; Camara 45+6'; Amavi (yellow card) 74'	Report	Greenwood 3', 31' (pen.); Cornelius (yellow card) 13'; Luis Henrique 26', 48'; Wahi 69'	Stadium: Stade Francis-Le Blé; Attendance: 14,962; Referee: Benoît Bastien

25 August 2024 2	Lens	2–0	Brest	Lens
15:00 CEST (UTC+2)	Labeau (yellow card) 17'; Chávez 19'; Le Cardinal 45' (o.g.); Khusanov (yellow card) 83'; Machado (red card) 88'	Report	Amavi (yellow card) 25'; Magnetti (yellow card) 67'; Faivre (yellow card) 67'	Stadium: Stade Bollaert-Delelis; Attendance: 37,435; Referee: Jérémie Pignard

31 August 2024 3	Brest	4–0	Saint-Étienne	Brest
17:00 CEST (UTC+2)	Camara 10'; Del Castillo 32' (pen.); Ajorque 77'; Lala 84' (pen.)	Report	Fomba (yellow card) 30'; Maçon (yellow card) 56'; Batubinsika (yellow card) 66'; Cafaro (yellow card) 80'; Cornud (yellow card) 82'	Stadium: Stade Francis-Le Blé; Attendance: 14,885; Referee: Gaël Angoula

14 September 2024 4	Paris Saint-Germain	3–1	Brest	Paris
21:00 CEST (UTC+2)	Beraldo (yellow card) 26'; Mendes (yellow card) 28'; Dembelé 42', 74'; Fabián 73'	Report	Del Castillo 29' (pen.); Camara (yellow card) 39'; Ajorque (yellow card) 49'; Chardonnet (yellow card) 59'	Stadium: Parc des Princes; Attendance: 47,000; Referee: Clément Turpin

22 September 2024 5	Brest	2–0	Toulouse	Brest
17:00 CEST (UTC+2)	Baldé 21'; Pereira Lage (yellow card) 34'; Faivre 90+1'	Report	Cásseres (yellow card) 19'; Aboukhlal (penalty missed) 35'	Stadium: Stade Francis-Le Blé; Attendance: 14,580; Referee: Florent Batta

27 September 2024 6	Auxerre	3–0	Brest	Auxerre
19:00 CEST (UTC+2)	Akpa (yellow card) 17'; Owusu 26'; Jubal 37' (pen.); Diomandé (yellow card) 53'; Traorè 59'	Report		Stadium: Stade de l'Abbé-Deschamps; Attendance: 15,381; Referee: Jérémy Stinat

6 October 2024 7	Brest	2–0	Le Havre	Brest
17:00 CEST (UTC+2)	Ajorque 12'; Haïdara (yellow card) 17' (yellow-red card) 73'; Ndiaye (yellow card) 25'; Lees-Melou (yellow card) 79'; Salah 90+2'	Report	Youte Kinkoue (red card) 48'	Stadium: Stade Francis-Le Blé; Attendance: 14,572; Referee: Benoît Millot

19 October 2024 8	Brest	1–1	Rennes	Brest
17:00 CEST (UTC+2)	Del Castillo 54' (pen.); Ajorque (yellow card) 62'; Ndiaye (yellow card) 90+2'	Report	Truffert (yellow card) 39'; Seidu (yellow card) 72'; Jota 86'	Stadium: Stade Francis-Le Blé; Attendance: 15,099; Referee: Bastien Dechepy

26 October 2024 9	Reims	1–2	Brest	Reims
19:00 CEST (UTC+2)	Okumu 29'; Fofana (yellow card) 63'; Diakhon (yellow card) 88'; Agbadou (yellow card) 90'	Report	Faivre 4' (pen.); Baldé 18'; Bizot (yellow card) 45+2'; Lees-Melou (yellow card) 65'	Stadium: Stade Auguste-Delaune; Attendance: 17,172; Referee: Jérôme Brisard

2 November 2024 10	Brest	0–1	Nice	Brest
19:00 CET (UTC+1)		Report	Guessand 42'; Dante (yellow card) 74'; Abdelmonem (yellow card) 84'	Stadium: Stade Francis-Le Blé; Attendance: 14,534; Referee: Clément Turpin

10 November 2024 11	Montpellier	3–1	Brest	Montpellier
17:00 CET (UTC+1)	Nordin 6' (pen.), (penalty missed) 60'; Khazri 12', (yellow card) 16'; Ferri (yellow card) 56'; Sagnan (yellow card) 60'; Touré (yellow card) 69'; Coulibaly 84'; Chennahi (yellow card) 90+2'	Report	Martin (yellow card) 26', (goal) 50'	Stadium: Stade de la Mosson; Attendance: 12,936; Referee: Jérémie Pignard

22 November 2024 12	Monaco	3–2	Brest	Monaco
19:00 CET (UTC+1)	Akliouche 5', 90+1'; Golovin 24'; Majecki (yellow card) 78'; Singo (yellow card) 85'	Report	Lala (yellow card) 6'; Sima 50'; Le Cardinal (yellow card) 83'; Ajorque 90+6'	Stadium: Stade Louis II; Attendance: 5,721; Referee: Thomas Léonard

30 November 2024 13	Brest	3–1	Strasbourg	Brest
19:00 CET (UTC+1)	Lala 12' (pen.); Baldé (yellow card) 27'; Chardonnet (yellow card) 32'; Ajorque (yellow card) 43', (penalty missed) 52'; Pereira Lage 45+1'; Del Castillo 90+2'	Report	Mara (yellow card) 41'; Moreira (yellow card) 74'; Ouattara 85'	Stadium: Stade Francis-Le Blé; Attendance: 14,600; Referee: Romain Lissorgue

6 December 2024 14	Lille	3–1	Brest	Villeneuve-d'Ascq
19:00 CET (UTC+1)	David 7' (pen.), 69'; Haraldsson 44'; André (yellow card) 80'	Report	Le Cardinal (yellow card) 6'; Ajorque 48'	Stadium: Stade Pierre-Mauroy; Attendance: 38,128; Referee: Benoît Bastien

15 December 2024 15	Brest	4–1	Nantes	Brest
17:00 CET (UTC+1)	Chardonnet (yellow card) 15', (goal) 27'; Doumbia 24'; Magnetti (yellow card) 54'; Camara (yellow card) 76'; Sima 88', 90+3'	Report	Castelletto (yellow card) 46'; Douglas Augusto 48'; Pallois (yellow card) 58'; Chirivella (yellow card) 60'	Stadium: Stade Francis-Le Blé; Attendance: 15,019; Referee: Gaël Angoula

5 January 2025 16	Angers	2–0	Brest	Angers
15:00 CET (UTC+1)	Lepaul 6'; Allevinah (yellow card) 9'; Aholou (yellow card) 45+1'; Niane 90+5'	Report	Haïdara (yellow card) 31'	Stadium: Stade Raymond Kopa; Attendance: 12,691; Referee: Benoît Millot

11 January 2025 17	Brest	2–1	Lyon	Brest
17:00 CET (UTC+1)	Camara 8'; Ajorque 25'; Fernandes (yellow card) 55'	Report	Veretout 45+2'; Tessmann (yellow card) 57'; Ćaleta-Car (yellow card) 90+2'	Stadium: Stade Francis-Le Blé; Attendance: 14,735; Referee: Eric Wattellier

18 January 2025 18	Rennes	1–2	Brest	Rennes
19:00 CET (UTC+1)	Blas (yellow card) 41', (goal) 77'; Fofana (yellow card) 90+3'	Report	Magnetti 27'; Zogbé (yellow card) 44'; Camara (yellow card) 71'; Ajorque 73'; Sima (yellow card) 90+6'	Stadium: Roazhon Park; Attendance: 28,238; Referee: Thomas Léonard

26 January 2025 19	Le Havre	0–1	Brest	Le Havre
15:00 CET (UTC+1)	Sangante (yellow card) 1'; Ayew (yellow card) 4'	Report	Camara (yellow card) 7'; Faivre (yellow card) 22'; Ajorque 25', (yellow card) 58'	Stadium: Stade Océane; Attendance: 17,898; Referee: Romain Lissorgue

1 February 2025 20	Brest	2–5	Paris Saint-Germain	Brest
17:00 CET (UTC+1)	Sima (yellow card) 36'; Del Castillo 50'; Ajorque 71'	Report	Dembélé 29', 57', 62'; Ramos 89', 90+7'	Stadium: Stade Francis-Le Blé; Attendance: 15,040; Referee: Benoît Bastien

7 February 2025 21	Nantes	0–2	Brest	Nantes
19:00 CET (UTC+1)	Douglas Augusto (yellow card) 65'; Chirivella (yellow card) 86'; Amian (yellow card) 90+2'	Report	Ajorque 9'; Magnetti (yellow card) 36'; Bizot (yellow card) 89'; Lees-Melou 90+6'	Stadium: Stade de la Beaujoire; Attendance: 25,050; Referee: Jérémie Pignard

14 February 2025 22	Brest	2–2	Auxerre	Brest
17:00 CET (UTC+1)	Baldé (yellow card) 25'; Ndiaye 60', (yellow card) 71'; Ajorque 79'	Report	Perrin 18', 74'; Akpa (yellow card) 30'; Dioussé (yellow card) 90+2'	Stadium: Stade Francis-Le Blé; Attendance: 12,525; Referee: Bastien Dechepy

23 February 2025 23	Strasbourg	0–0	Brest	Strasbourg
17:15 CET (UTC+1)	Bakwa (yellow card) 28'; Barco (yellow card) 31'; Diarra (yellow card) 64'	Report	Coulibaly (yellow card) 43'	Stadium: Stade de la Meinau; Attendance: 19,108; Referee: Clément Turpin

2 March 2025 24	Lyon	2–1	Brest	Décines-Charpieu
15:00 CET (UTC+1)	Lacazette 24', 82', (yellow card) 45+3'; Tessmann (yellow card) 34'	Report	Lala 15' (pen.), (yellow card) 59'	Stadium: Parc Olympique Lyonnais; Attendance: 47,804; Referee: Benoît Millot

9 March 2025 25	Brest	2–0	Angers	Brest
15:00 CET (UTC+1)	Sima 19'; Magnetti (yellow card) 37'; Faivre 60'	Report	Biumla (yellow card) 82'	Stadium: Stade Francis-Le Blé; Attendance: 14,612; Referee: Abdelatif Kherradji

16 March 2025 26	Brest	0–0	Reims	Brest
17:15 CET (UTC+1)	Doumbia (yellow card) 76'; Haïdara (red card) 90+1'	Report	Nakamura (yellow card) 3'; Atangana (yellow card) 19'; Sekine (yellow card) 85'	Stadium: Stade Francis-Le Blé; Attendance: 14,517; Referee: Jérôme Brisard

30 March 2025 27	Toulouse	2–4	Brest	Toulouse
15:00 CEST (UTC+2)	Sierro 65'; King 78'	Report	Bourgault 22'; Lala (yellow card) 24'; Pereira Lage 26', (yellow card) 68'; Lees-Melou (yellow card) 28', (goal) 62'; Bizot (yellow card) 86'; Zogbé (yellow card) 87'; Camara 90'	Stadium: Stadium de Toulouse; Attendance: 24,418; Referee: Hakim Ben El Hadj

5 April 2025 28	Brest	2–1	Monaco	Brest
19:00 CEST (UTC+2)	Chardonnet (yellow card) 30'; Sima 42'; Camara (yellow card) 44', (goal) 90+4'; Lala (yellow card) 65'	Report	Embolo (yellow card) 17'; Zakaria 63' (pen.); Camara (yellow card) 64'; Biereth (yellow card) 90+5'	Stadium: Stade Francis-Le Blé; Attendance: 14,713; Referee: Thomas Léonard

13 April 2025 29	Saint-Étienne	3–3	Brest	Saint-Étienne
15:00 CEST (UTC+2)	Stassin 16'; Moueffek (yellow card) 18'; Cardona 34', 80'; Larsonneur (yellow card) 71'	Report	Ajorque 6', 37'; Sima 25'; Chardonnet (yellow card) 60'; Lees-Melou (yellow card) 78'; Baldé (yellow card) 83'; Bizot (yellow card) 90+4'	Stadium: Stade Geoffroy-Guichard; Attendance: 32,834; Referee: Abdelatif Kherradji

20 April 2025 30	Brest	1–3	Lens	Brest
17:15 CEST (UTC+2)	Lees-Melou 13'; Ndiaye (red card) 45+5'	Report	Koyalipou 17'; El Aynaoui 45+7' (pen.); Saïd 90'	Stadium: Stade Francis-Le Blé; Attendance: 15,049; Referee: Benoît Millot

27 April 2025 31	Marseille	4–1	Brest	Marseille
20:45 CEST (UTC+2)	Gouiri 8', 45', 63'; Chardonnet 37' (o.g.); Murillo (yellow card) 41'	Report	Sima 25'; Ajorque (yellow card) 36'; Chardonnet (yellow card) 71'; Le Cardinal (yellow card) 88'; Lees-Melou (yellow card) 90+2'	Stadium: Stade Vélodrome; Attendance: 62,130; Referee: Stéphanie Frappart

4 May 2025 32	Brest	1–0	Montpellier	Brest
17:15 CEST (UTC+2)	Del Castillo 15'; Lees-Melou (yellow card) 73'	Report	Nzingoula (yellow card) 13'; Fayad (yellow card) 89'	Stadium: Stade Francis-Le Blé; Attendance: 13,121; Referee: Romain Lissorgue

10 May 2025 33	Brest	2–0	Lille	Brest
21:00 CEST (UTC+2)	Ajorque 42'; Doumbia 64'; Pereira Lage (yellow card) 70'	Report	Meunier (yellow card) 40'	Stadium: Stade Francis-Le Blé; Attendance: 14,556; Referee: Thomas Léonard

17 May 2025 34	Nice	6–0	Brest	Nice
21:00 CEST (UTC+2)	Guessand 16'; Laborde 19', 75'; Bouanani 28' (pen.); Moffi 82'; Abdi 90+4'	Report	Locko (yellow card) 26'; Lees-Melou (yellow card) 33'; Ndiaye (yellow card) 48'; Magnetti (yellow card) 62'; Baldé (yellow card) 90+3'	Stadium: Allianz Riviera; Attendance: 30,298; Referee: Hakim Ben El Hadj

=== Coupe de France ===
21 December 2024 Round of 64	La Roche	0–1	Brest	La Roche-sur-Yon
15:30 CET (UTC+1)	N'Diaye (yellow card) 40'; Khouma (yellow card) 82'	Report	Ajorque 41'	Stadium: Stade Henri Desgrange; Attendance: 4,530; Referee: Aurélien Petit

15 January 2025 Round of 32	Brest	2–1	Nantes	Brest
18:30 CET (UTC+1)	Sima 24'; Charonnet 34'; Baldé (yellow card) 87'; Ndiaye (yellow card) 90+4'	Report	Guirassy 83'	Stadium: Stade Francis-Le Blé; Attendance: 11,581; Referee: Abdelatif Kherradji

4 February 2025 Round of 16	Troyes	1–2	Brest	Troyes
19:00 CET (UTC+1)	Magnetti 55' (o.g.)	Report	Bourgault (yellow card) 47'; Salah 49'; Coulibaly (yellow card) 89'; Sima 90+2'	Stadium: Stade de l'Aube; Attendance: 4,500; Referee: Jérémy Stinat

26 February 2025 Quarter-finals	Brest	2–3	Dunkerque	Brest
19:00 CET (UTC+1)	Sima (yellow card) 9'; Magnetti (yellow card) 33'; Pereira Lage 45'; Youssouf 59' (o.g.)	Report	Kondo (yellow card) 23'; Georgen (yellow card) 35'; Sasso 65'; Courtet (yellow card) 74'; Sanganté 80', 84'	Stadium: Stade Francis-Le Blé; Attendance: 14,806; Referee: Willy Delajod

=== UEFA Champions League ===
==== League phase ====
The draw for the league phase was held on 29 August 2024.

Pos	Team	Pld	W	D	L	GF	GA	GD	Pts	Qualification
16	(Portuguese Football Federation) Benfica	8	4	1	3	16	12	+4	13	Advance to knockout phase play-offs (seeded)
17	(French Football Federation) Monaco	8	4	1	3	13	13	0	13	Advance to knockout phase play-offs (unseeded)
18	(French Football Federation) Brest	8	4	1	3	10	11	−1	13	Advance to knockout phase play-offs (unseeded)
19	(Royal Dutch Football Association) Feyenoord	8	4	1	3	18	21	−3	13	Advance to knockout phase play-offs (unseeded)
20	(Italian Football Federation) Juventus	8	3	3	2	9	7	+2	12	Advance to knockout phase play-offs (unseeded)

Source: UEFA
Rules for classification: League phase tiebreakers

Round	1	2	3	4	5	6	7	8
Ground	H	A	H	A	A	H	A	H
Result	W	W	D	W	L	W	L	L
Position	12	2	5	4	11	7	13	18
Points	3	6	7	10	10	13	13	13

Source: UEFA
A = Away; H = Home; W = Win; D = Draw; L = Loss

19 September 2024 1	Brest (France)	2–1	(Austria) Sturm Graz	Guingamp
21:00 CEST (UTC+2)	Magnetti 23'; Sima (yellow card) 36', (goal) 56'; Camara (yellow card) 64'; Ajorque (yellow card) 85'	Report	Horvat (yellow card) 21'; Johnston (yellow card) 22'; Lavalée (yellow card) 40' (yellow-red card) 89'; Fernandes 45+1' (o.g.); Stanković (yellow card) 59'; Gazibegović (yellow card) 83'	Stadium: Stade de Roudourou; Attendance: 14,518; Referee: Nick Walsh (Scotland)
Note: The match was played at Stade de Roudourou in Guingamp, instead of Brest's regular stadium, Stade Francis-Le Blé in Brest, which did not meet UEFA requirements.

1 October 2024 2	Red Bull Salzburg (Austria)	0–4	(France) Brest	Salzburg, Austria
18:45 CEST (UTC+2)	Gloukh (yellow card) 18'; Baidoo (yellow card) 63'; Daghim (yellow card) 86'	Report	Le Cardinal (yellow card) 15'; Sima 21', 70'; Haïdara (yellow card) 26'; Camara 66'; Pereira Lage 75'	Stadium: Red Bull Arena; Attendance: 20,232; Referee: Anthony Taylor (England)

23 October 2024 3	Brest (France)	1–1	(Germany) Bayer Leverkusen	Guingamp
18:45 CEST (UTC+2)	Lees-Melou 39', (yellow card) 90+5'; Salah (yellow card) 84'	Report	Wirtz 24', (yellow card) 74'; Frimpong (yellow card) 72'; Tah (yellow card) 90+2'; Xhaka (yellow card) 90+8'	Stadium: Stade de Roudourou; Attendance: 15,510; Referee: Ivan Kružliak (Slovakia)
Note: The match was played at Stade de Roudourou in Guingamp, instead of Brest's regular stadium, Stade Francis-Le Blé in Brest, which did not meet UEFA requirements.

6 November 2024 4	Sparta Prague (Czech Republic)	1–2	(France) Brest	Prague, Czech Republic
21:00 CET (UTC+1)	Ryneš (yellow card) 69'; Olatunji 90+2'	Report	Ajorque (yellow card) 23'; Fernandes 37'; Kairinen 80' (o.g.)	Stadium: Stadion Letná; Attendance: 18,033; Referee: Mykola Balakin (Ukraine)

26 November 2024 5	Barcelona (Spain)	3–0	(France) Brest	Barcelona, Spain
21:00 CET (UTC+1)	Lewandowski 10' (pen.), 90+2'; Olmo 66'	Report	Lala (yellow card) 24'; Camara (yellow card) 63'; Ajorque (yellow card) 74'; Le Cardinal (yellow card) 81'	Stadium: Estadi Olímpic Lluís Companys; Attendance: 46,317; Referee: Irfan Peljto (Bosnia and Herzegovina)
Note: The match was played at Estadi Olímpic Lluís Companys, instead of Barcelona's regular stadium, Camp Nou, which was being renovated.

10 December 2024 6	Brest (France)	1–0	(Netherlands) PSV Eindhoven	Guingamp
21:00 CET (UTC+1)	Le Cardinal 43', (yellow card) 45+2'; Del Castillo (yellow card) 58'; Chardonnet (yellow card) 84'	Report	Dams (yellow card) 41'; Tillman (yellow card) 64'; Veerman (yellow card) 86'	Stadium: Stade de Roudourou; Attendance: 15,778; Referee: José María Sánchez Martínez (Spain)
Note: The match was played at Stade de Roudourou in Guingamp, instead of Brest's regular stadium, Stade Francis-Le Blé in Brest, which did not meet UEFA requirements.

22 January 2025 7	Shakhtar Donetsk (Ukraine)	2–0	(France) Brest	Gelsenkirchen, Germany
18:45 CET (UTC+1)	Kevin 18'; Sudakov 37' (pen.); Stepanenko (yellow card) 77'	Report	Ndiaye (yellow card) 22'	Stadium: Arena AufSchalke; Attendance: 15,282; Referee: Sandro Schärer (Switzerland)
Note: Due to the Russian invasion of Ukraine, Shakhtar Donetsk were required to play their home matches at neutral venues until further notice.

29 January 2025 8	Brest (France)	0–3	(Spain) Real Madrid	Guingamp
21:00 CET (UTC+1)	Pereira Lage (yellow card) 10'	Report	Rodrygo 27', 78'; Tchouaméni (yellow card) 29'; Rüdiger (yellow card) 35'; Bellingham 56', (yellow card) 74'	Stadium: Stade de Roudourou; Attendance: 15,405; Referee: Espen Eskås (Norway)
Note: The match was played at Stade de Roudourou in Guingamp, instead of Brest's regular stadium, Stade Francis-Le Blé in Brest, which did not meet UEFA requirements.

==== Knockout phase ====
===== Knockout phase play-offs =====
The draw for the knockout phase play-offs was held on 31 January 2025.

11 February 2025 First leg	Brest (France)	0–3	(France) Paris Saint-Germain	Guingamp
18:45 CET (UTC+1)	Chardonnet (yellow card) 74'	Report	Vitinha 21' (pen.); Dembélé 45', 66'; Barcola (yellow card) 70'	Stadium: Stade de Roudourou; Attendance: 15,831; Referee: Irfan Peljto (Bosnia and Herzegovina)
Note: The match was played at Stade de Roudourou in Guingamp, instead of Brest's regular stadium, Stade Francis-Le Blé in Brest, which did not meet UEFA requirements.

19 February 2025 Second leg	Paris Saint-Germain (France)	7–0 (10–0 agg.)	(France) Brest	Paris
21:00 CET (UTC+1)	Barcola 20'; Kvaratskhelia 39'; Vitinha 59'; Doué 64'; Mendes 69'; Ramos 76'; Mayulu 86'	Report	Haïdara (yellow card) 67'; Le Cardinal (yellow card) 80'	Stadium: Parc des Princes; Attendance: 47,211; Referee: Michael Oliver (England)
