= Soumaïla Coulibaly =

Soumaïla Coulibaly may refer to:

- Soumaïla Coulibaly (footballer, born 1978), Malian footballer
- Soumaïla Coulibaly (footballer, born 2003), French footballer
