= 2024–25 RC Lens season =

RC Lens
2024–25 season
- President: Joseph Oughourlian
- Head coach: Will Still
- Stadium: Stade Bollaert-Delelis
- Ligue 1: 8th
- Coupe de France: Round of 64
- UEFA Conference League: Play-off round
- Top goalscorer: League: M'Bala Nzola (6 goals); All: M'Bala Nzola (6 goals)
- Average home league attendance: 37,936
Home colours	Away colours	Third colours

The 2024–25 season was the 118th season in the history of Racing Club de Lens, and the club's fifth consecutive season in Ligue 1. In addition to the domestic league, the club participated in the Coupe de France and the UEFA Conference League.

== Summary ==
On 10 June, it was announced that Will Still would take over as coach of the team on a three-season contract, succeeding Franck Haise.

== Players ==
=== First-team squad ===
As of 1 May 2025

Note: Flags indicate national team as defined under FIFA eligibility rules; some limited exceptions apply. Players may hold more than one non-FIFA nationality.

No.	Pos.	Nation	Player
1	GK	SLO	Denis Petrić
2	DF	FRA	Ruben Aguilar
3	DF	COL	Deiver Machado
4	DF	BIH	Nidal Čelik
7	FW	FRA	Florian Sotoca (captain)
8	FW	ANG	M'Bala Nzola (on loan from Fiorentina)
9	FW	URU	Martín Satriano
10	MF	POR	David Costa
11	MF	FRA	Angelo Fulgini
13	DF	ECU	Jhoanner Chávez
14	DF	ARG	Facundo Medina
15	MF	NGR	Hamzat Ojediran
16	GK	BFA	Hervé Koffi
18	MF	FRA	Andy Diouf

No.	Pos.	Nation	Player
19	FW	CAF	Goduine Koyalipou
20	DF	FRA	Malang Sarr
21	MF	MAR	Anass Zaroury
22	FW	FRA	Wesley Saïd
23	MF	MAR	Neil El Aynaoui
24	DF	FRA	Jonathan Gradit
25	FW	SWE	Jeremy Agbonifo (on loan from BK Häcken)
26	MF	SEN	Nampalys Mendy
27	DF	SLE	Juma Bah (on loan from Manchester City)
28	MF	FRA	Adrien Thomasson
30	GK	AUS	Mathew Ryan
34	DF	FRA	Tom Pouilly
36	FW	FRA	Rémy Labeau Lascary

=== Out on loan ===
Note: Flags indicate national team as defined under FIFA eligibility rules; some limited exceptions apply. Players may hold more than one non-FIFA nationality.

No.	Pos.	Nation	Player
—	GK	COM	Yannick Pandor (at Boulogne until 30 June 2025)
—	DF	SEN	Sidi Bane (at Annecy until 30 June 2025)
—	DF	FRA	Ismaëlo Ganiou (at Annecy until 30 June 2025)
—	MF	GHA	Salis Abdul Samed (at Sunderland until 30 June 2025)

No.	Pos.	Nation	Player
—	MF	MNE	Andrija Bulatović (at Budućnost Podgorica until 30 June 2025)
—	MF	COL	Óscar Cortés (at Rangers until 30 June 2025)
—	MF	GUI	Morgan Guilavogui (at St. Pauli until 30 June 2025)
—	FW	FRA	Kembo Diliwidi (at Le Mans until 30 June 2025)

== Transfers ==
=== In ===
Pos.	Player	Transferred from	Fee	Date	Source
DF	(Ecuador) Jhoanner Chávez	(Brazil) Bahia	€4,500,000	1 July 2024	
GK	(Burkina Faso) Hervé Koffi	(Belgium) Charleroi	€2,000,000	1 July 2024	
MF	(France) Ahmed Majid	(France) Wasquehal	Free	11 July 2024	
DF	(France) Malang Sarr	(England) Chelsea	Free	26 July 2024	
MF	(Nigeria) Hamzat Ojediran	(Hungary) Debreceni	€1,500,000	7 August 2024	
GK	(Serbia) Denis Petrić	(France) Nantes	Free	8 August 2024	
FW	(Angola) M'Bala Nzola	(Italy) Fiorentina	Loan	9 August 2024	
MF	(Morocco) Anass Zaroury	(England) Burnley	€9,000,000	22 August 2024	
FW	(Uruguay) Martín Satriano	(Italy) Inter Milan	Loan	23 August 2024	
FW	(Central African Republic) Goduine Koyalipou	(Bulgaria) CSKA Sofia	€2,000,000	9 January 2025	
GK	(Australia) Mathew Ryan	(Italy) Roma	€800,000	21 January 2025	
DF	(Sierra Leone) Juma Bah	(England) Manchester City	Loan	27 January 2025	
FW	(Sweden) Jeremy Agbonifo	(Sweden) BK Häcken	Loan	29 January 2025	
DF	(Bosnia and Herzegovina) Nidal Čelik	(Bosnia and Herzegovina) Sarajevo	€2,500,000	3 February 2025	

Total expenditure: ▼€22.3 million (excluding potential add-ons, bonuses and undisclosed figures)

=== Out ===
Pos.	Player	Transferred to	Fee	Date	Source
MF	(Poland) Łukasz Poręba	(Germany) Hamburger SV	€1 million	1 July 2024	
FW	(Colombia) Óscar Cortés	(Scotland) Rangers	Loan	1 July 2024	
FW	(Poland) Adam Buksa	(Denmark) Midtjylland	€4 million	11 July 2024	
MF	(France) Fodé Sylla	(Switzerland) Yverdon-Sport	Loan	11 July 2024	
FW	(France) Elye Wahi	(France) Marseille	€25 million	13 August 2024	
GK	(France) Brice Samba	(France) Rennes	€14 million	8 January 2025	
DF	(Uzbekistan) Abdukodir Khusanov	(England) Manchester City	€40 million	20 January 2025	
DF	(Austria) Kevin Danso	(England) Tottenham Hotspur	Loan	2 February 2025	

Total income: ▲€84 million (excluding potential add-ons, bonuses and undisclosed figures)

Notes

1. ^{†} Loan transfer made permanent

== Friendlies ==
=== Pre-season ===
6 July 2024 Friendly	Lens	6–3	Kortrijk	Avion
15:00 CEST (UTC+2)	Saïd 14'; Aguilar 35'; Ganiou 53'; Cabot 72'; Thomasson 90'; Wahi 101'	Report	Fossum 30'; Kadri 70'; Sissako 86'	Stadium: La Gaillette
Note: The match was played in four periods of 25 minutes each.

12 July 2024 Friendly	Lens	6–0	Red Star	Billy-Montigny
12:15 CEST (UTC+2)	Wahi 6', 15', 24'; Saïd 55'; Guilavogui 76'; Fulgini 85'	Report		Stadium: Stade Paul Guerre; Attendance: 0 (behind closed doors)

20 July 2024 Friendly	OH Leuven	0–1	Lens	Leuven, Belgium
15:00 CEST (UTC+2)		Report	Saïd 90+13'	Stadium: Den Dreef

27 July 2024 Friendly	Utrecht	2–1	Lens	Utrecht, Netherlands
12:00 CEST (UTC+2)	Toornstra 45'; Horemans 80'	Report	Fulgini 36'	Stadium: Sportcomplex Zoudenbalch

27 July 2024 Friendly	Utrecht	4–5	Lens	Utrecht, Netherlands
14:00 CEST (UTC+2)	Descotte 9'; Jenner 34'; Blake 53'; Lidberg 73'	Report	Spierings 14'; Saïd 16', 56'; Labeau 65' (pen.); Pouilly 85'	Stadium: Sportcomplex Zoudenbalch

3 August 2024 Friendly	Lens	2–2	Bayer Leverkusen	Lens
16:00 CEST (UTC+2)	Medina (yellow card) 37'; Saïd 45'; Sotoca (yellow card) 60'; Gradit 84'	Report	Terrier 6'; Boniface (yellow card) 33'; Wirtz 51'; Hincapié (yellow card) 72'	Stadium: Stade Bollaert-Delelis; Attendance: 38,223; Referee: Marc Bollengier (France)

7 August 2024 Friendly	Versailles	1–3	Lens	Avion
16:00 CEST (UTC+2)	Basque 32' (pen.)	Report	Labeau 18'; Danso 51'; Thomasson 69'	Stadium: Stade François Blin

10 August 2024 Friendly	Lens	3–0	Leicester City	Lens
16:00 CEST (UTC+2)	Danso 47'; Fulgini 52', 56'	Report	Ndidi (yellow card) 51'	Stadium: Stade Bollaert-Delelis; Attendance: 33,537

== Competitions ==
=== Overall record ===
Competition	First match	Last match	Starting round	Final position	Record							
Competition	First match	Last match	Starting round	Final position	Pld	W	D	L	GF	GA	GD	Win %
Ligue 1	18 August 2024	17 May 2025	Matchday 1		33	14	7	12	38	39	−1	42.42
Coupe de France	20–23 December 2024		Round of 64		1	0	1	0	1	1	+0	0.00
UEFA Conference League	22 August 2024	29 August 2024	Play-off round	Play-off round	2	1	0	1	2	3	−1	50.00
Total					36	15	8	13	41	43	−2	41.67

Last updated: 11 May 2025
Source: Soccerway

=== Ligue 1 ===
==== League table ====
Pos	Team	Pld	W	D	L	GF	GA	GD	Pts	Qualification or relegation
6	Lyon	34	17	6	11	65	46	+19	57	Qualification for the Europa League league phase (Note: Since the 2024–25 Coupe de France winners, Paris Saint-Germain, qualified for the Champions League via league position, the Europa League berth awarded to the cup winners was passed to the sixth-placed team and the Conference League berth was passed to the seventh-placed team.)
7	Strasbourg	34	16	9	9	56	44	+12	57	Qualification for the Conference League play-off round
8	Lens	34	15	7	12	42	39	+3	52	
9	Brest	34	15	5	14	52	59	−7	50	
10	Toulouse	34	11	9	14	44	43	+1	42	

Source: Ligue 1
Rules for classification: 1) Points; 2) Goal difference; 3) Head-to-head points; 4) Head-to-head goal difference; 5) Head-to-head goals scored; 6) Head-to-head away goals scored; 7) Goals scored; 8) Away goals scored; 9) Fair-play points (Note: Head-to-head record is used only after all the matches between the teams in question have been played).

==== Results summary ====
Overall								Home						Away					
Pld	W	D	L	GF	GA	GD	Pts	W	D	L	GF	GA	GD	W	D	L	GF	GA	GD
33	14	6	13	38	39	−1	48	6	2	8	15	22	−7	8	4	5	23	17	+6

Last updated: 11 May 2025.
Source: Ligue 1

==== Results by round ====
Round	1	2	3	4	5	6	7	8	9	10	11	12	13	14	15	16	17	18	19	20	21	22	23	24	25	26	27	28	29	30	31	32	33	34
Ground	A	H	A	H	A	H	A	A	H	A	H	H	A	H	A	H	A	H	H	A	A	H	A	H	A	H	A	H	H	A	H	A	A	H
Result	W	W	D	D	D	D	D	W	L	L	W	L	W	W	D	L	W	L	W	W	L	L	L	L	W	W	L	W	L	W	L	W	D	W
Position	7	4	5	4	4	6	6	5	5	7	8	9	7	7	7	7	7	7	7	6	7	8	8	9	8	8	9	9	9	8	8	8	9	8

Updated to match(es) played on 17 May 2025. Source: Ligue 1
A = Away; H = Home; W = Win; D = Draw; L = Loss

==== Matches ====
The league schedule was released on 21 June 2024.

Fixture Win Draw Loss

18 August 2024 1	Angers	0–1	Lens	Angers
17:00 CEST (UTC+2)	Lefort (yellow card) 58'	Report	Saïd 28'	Stadium: Stade Raymond Kopa; Attendance: 14,811; Referee: Thomas Léonard

25 August 2024 2	Lens	2–0	Brest	Lens
15:00 CEST (UTC+2)	Labeau (yellow card) 17'; Chávez 19'; Le Cardinal 45' (o.g.); Khusanov (yellow card) 83'; Machado (red card) 88'	Report	Amavi (yellow card) 25'; Magnetti (yellow card) 67'; Faivre (yellow card) 67'	Stadium: Stade Bollaert-Delelis; Attendance: 37,435; Referee: Jérémie Pignard

1 September 2024 3	Monaco	1–1	Lens	Monaco
15:00 CEST (UTC+2)	Vanderson (yellow card) 54'; Zakaria 84'	Report	Gradit (yellow card) 9'; Aguilar (yellow card) 34'; Sotoca (yellow card) 39'; Labeau (yellow card) 68'; Frankowski 90+4' (pen.)	Stadium: Stade Louis II; Attendance: 9,030; Referee: Willy Delajod

15 September 2024 4	Lens	0–0	Lyon	Lens
20:45 CEST (UTC+2)		Report		Stadium: Stade Bollaert-Delelis; Attendance: 38,116; Referee: Bastien Dechepy

21 September 2024 5	Rennes	1–1	Lens	Rennes
19:00 CEST (UTC+2)	Kalimuendo 24' (pen.); Blas (yellow card) 45'; Hateboer (yellow card) 90+9'	Report	Labeau (yellow card) 34'; Medina (yellow card) 73'; Ojediran (yellow card) 77'; Nzola 90+6'; Saïd (yellow card) 90+10'	Stadium: Roazhon Park; Attendance: 28,500; Referee: Jérémy Stinat

28 September 2024 6	Lens	0–0	Nice	Lens
17:00 CEST (UTC+2)	Frankowski (yellow card) 53'; Zaroury (yellow card) 67' (yellow-red card) 84'	Report	Abdelmonem (yellow card) 28'; Dante (yellow card) 90+8'	Stadium: Stade Bollaert-Delelis; Attendance: 37,301; Referee: François Letexier

6 October 2024 7	Strasbourg	2–2	Lens	Strasbourg
17:00 CEST (UTC+2)	Sylla 18'; Santos (yellow card) 22'; Doukouré (yellow card) 41'; Diarra 60'	Report	Nzola 5', (yellow card) 70'; Chávez (yellow card) 38'; Saïd (yellow card) 41'; Diouf 44'; Medina (yellow card) 64'	Stadium: Stade de la Meinau; Attendance: 19,968; Referee: Stéphanie Frappart

19 October 2024 8	Saint-Étienne	0–2	Lens	Saint-Étienne
19:00 CEST (UTC+2)	Nadé (yellow card) 60'; Amougou (yellow card) 61'	Report	Frankowski 20'; Medina (yellow card) 31'; Nzola (yellow card) 56'; Labeau Lascary 64'	Stadium: Stade Geoffroy-Guichard; Attendance: 36,832; Referee: Romain Lissorgue

26 October 2024 9	Lens	0–2	Lille	Lens
21:00 CEST (UTC+2)	Thomasson (yellow card) 13'; Pouilly (yellow card) 64'; Gradit (yellow card) 86'; Nzola (yellow card) 90+10'	Report	Gudmundsson (yellow card) 20'; Meunier (yellow card) 75'; Mandi (yellow card) 89'; André (yellow card) 90+2'; David 90+8' (pen.) (yellow card) 90+9'; Bayo 90+11'	Stadium: Stade Bollaert-Delelis; Attendance: 38,223; Referee: Benoît Bastien

2 November 2024 10	Paris Saint-Germain	1–0	Lens	Paris
17:00 CET (UTC+1)	Dembélé 4'; Marquinhos (yellow card) 57'	Report	Khusanov (yellow card) 45+1' (yellow-red card) 59'; Gradit (yellow card) 47'; Diouf (yellow card) 62'; Danso (yellow card) 86'	Stadium: Parc des Princes; Attendance: 47,889; Referee: Willy Delajod

9 November 2024 11	Lens	3–2	Nantes	Lens
19:00 CET (UTC+1)	Frankowski 21' (pen.); Medina (yellow card) 36'; Labeau Lascary (yellow card) 45+5'; Ojediran 86'; Thomasson 86'	Report	Simon 36' (pen.); Cozza 71'	Stadium: Stade Bollaert-Delelis; Attendance: 38,202; Referee: Clément Turpin

23 November 2024 12	Lens	1–3	Marseille	Lens
17:00 CET (UTC+1)	Frankowski (yellow card) 37'; Machado (yellow card) 74'; Fulgini 80' (yellow card) 90+6'; Danso (yellow card) 83'; Sotoca (yellow card) 90+6'	Report	Rongier (yellow card) 19' (goal) 49'; Henrique 57'; Kondogbia (yellow card) 65'; Højbjerg 89'; Garcia (yellow card) 90+1'	Stadium: Stade Bollaert-Delelis; Attendance: 38,223; Referee: Éric Wattellier

29 November 2024 13	Reims	0–2	Lens	Reims
20:45 CET (UTC+1)	Atangana (yellow card) 42'	Report	Thomasson 23'; Diouf (yellow card) 32'; Nzola 61'; Labeau Lascary (yellow card) 66'	Stadium: Stade Auguste-Delaune; Attendance: 18,555; Referee: Abdelatif Kherradji

8 December 2024 14	Lens	2–0	Montpellier	Lens
15:00 CET (UTC+1)	Labeau 39'; Sotoca (yellow card) 79'; Samba (yellow card) 90'; Lecomte 90+1' (o.g.)	Report	Savanier (yellow card) 43'; Sagnan (yellow card) 71'; Tchato (yellow card) 90+4'	Stadium: Stade Bollaert-Delelis; Referee: Mathieu Vernice

14 December 2024 15	Auxerre	2–2	Lens	Auxerre
19:00 CET (UTC+1)	Sinayoko (yellow card) 21'; Perrin 31'; Mensah (yellow card) 52'; Joly (yellow card) 64'; Osho 73'	Report	El Aynaoui 22', (yellow card) 51'; Nzola 45'	Stadium: Stade de l'Abbé-Deschamps; Referee: Jérémy Stinat

5 January 2025 16	Lens	0–1	Toulouse	Lens
15:00 CET (UTC+1)	Frankowski (yellow card) 8'; Danso (yellow card) 31'; Costa (red card) 61'; Fulgini (yellow card) 64'; Koffi (yellow card) 77'; Ojediran (yellow card) 90+1'	Report	Cresswell (yellow card) 10'; Aboukhlal 73' (pen.); Gboho (yellow card) 77'	Stadium: Stade Bollaert-Delelis; Attendance: 37,461; Referee: Hakim Ben El Hadj

12 January 2025 17	Le Havre	1–2	Lens	Le Havre
15:00 CET (UTC+1)	Ayew 8', (yellow card) 34'; Youte Kinkoue (yellow card) 62'	Report	Thomasson (yellow card) 13'; Koyalipou 48'; Machado 77'; Koffi (yellow card) 90+3'	Stadium: Stade Océane; Attendance: 19,617; Referee: Clement Turpin

18 January 2025 18	Lens	1–2	Paris Saint-Germain	Lens
CET (UTC+1)	Nzola 36'; Machado (yellow card) 45'; Thomasson (yellow card) 61'	Report	Vitinha (yellow card) 29'; Fabián Ruiz 59'; Barcola 86'; Mayulu (yellow card) 90'	Stadium: Stade Bollaert-Delelis; Attendance: 38,120; Referee: Jérémy Pignard

26 January 2025 19	Lens	1–0	Angers	Lens
16:15 CET (UTC+1)	Frankowski 49'; Medina (yellow card) 80'	Report	Fofana (yellow card) 48'	Stadium: Stade Bollaert-Delelis; Attendance: 37,321; Referee: Abdelatif Kherradji

31 January 2025 20	Montpellier	0–2	Lens	Montpellier
20:45 CET (UTC+1)	Sainte-Luce (yellow card) 18'; Kouyaté (yellow card) 50'; Sagnan (yellow card) 78'; Chotard (yellow card) 90+1'	Report	Nzola 1'; Machado (yellow card) 45+6'; Medina (yellow card) 45+7'; Agbonifo 61'; Ojediran (yellow card) 90+6'	Stadium: Stade de la Mosson; Attendance: 15,330; Referee: Bastien Dechepy

8 February 2025 21	Nice	2–0	Lens	Nice
17:00 CET (UTC+1)	Cho (yellow card) 7'; Laborde 10' (pen.); Clauss 64'	Report	Thomasson (yellow card) 9'; Medina (yellow card) 31' (yellow-red card) 57'; Ojediran (yellow card) 88'	Stadium: Allianz Riviera; Attendance: 22,586; Referee: Romain Lissorgue

16 February 2025 22	Lens	0–2	Strasbourg	Lens
17:15 CET (UTC+1)	Fulgini (yellow card) 4'; Machado (yellow card) 57' (yellow-red card) 72'; El Aynaoui (yellow card) 85'	Report	Bakwa 81'; Lemaréchal (yellow card) 90+3'; Emegha 90+6', (yellow card) 90+7'	Stadium: Stade Bollaert-Delelis; Attendance: 38,113; Referee: Benoît Millot

23 February 2025 23	Nantes	3–1	Lens	Nantes
15:00 CET (UTC+1)	Leroux 36'; Amian (yellow card) 58'; Simon 60' (pen.); Lopes (yellow card) 82'; Elia 90+5'	Report	Gradit (yellow card) 28'; Medina (yellow card) 45+1'; El Aynaoui 65' (pen.); Thomasson (yellow card) 66'; Nzola (red card) 70'; Fulgini (yellow card) 90+8'	Stadium: Stade de la Beaujoire; Attendance: 29,000; Referee: Jérôme Brisard

1 March 2025 24	Lens	3–4	Le Havre	Lens
19:00 CET (UTC+1)	El Aynaoui 3' (pen.); Aguilar 19', (yellow card) 34'; Sotoca 48'; Saïd (yellow card) 65'	Report	Touré (yellow card) 22'; Soumaré 28'; Ayew 33'; Casimir 62'; Hassan (yellow card) 65', (goal) 90+1' (pen.)	Stadium: Stade Bollaert-Delelis; Attendance: 38,167; Referee: Jérémy Pignard

8 March 2025 25	Marseille	0–1	Lens	Marseille
21:05 CET (UTC+1)	Rongier (yellow card) 53'; Bennacer (yellow card) 77'; Balerdi (yellow card) 84'	Report	Bah (yellow card) 60'; El Aynaoui 90+4'	Stadium: Stade Vélodrome; Attendance: 64,942; Referee: Thomas Léonard

15 March 2025 26	Lens	1–0	Rennes	Lens
21:05 CET (UTC+1)	Saïd 47'; El Aynaoui (yellow card) 69'	Report	Matusiwa (yellow card) 21'	Stadium: Stade Bollaert-Delelis; Attendance: 38,182; Referee: Stéphanie Frappart

30 March 2025 27	Lille	1–0	Lens	Villeneuve-d'Ascq
20:45 CEST (UTC+2)	Fernandez-Pardo 19'; Bouaddi (yellow card) 88'	Report	Aguilar (yellow card) 22'; El Aynaoui (yellow card) 51'; Medina (yellow card) 82'	Stadium: Stade Pierre-Mauroy; Attendance: 48,197; Referee: Mathieu Vernice

6 April 2025 28	Lens	1–0	Saint-Étienne	Lens
15:00 CET (UTC+1)	Machado (yellow card) 19'; Medina (yellow card) 30'; Koyalipou 75'; Ojediran (yellow card) 65'	Report	Maçon (yellow card) 32'; Bouchouari (yellow card) 65'	Stadium: Stade Bollaert-Delelis; Attendance: 38,223; Referee: Romain Lissorgue

11 April 2024 29	Lens	0–2	Reims	Lens
20:45 CEST (UTC+2)	Medina (yellow card) 81'	Report	Nakamura 33', 88'	Stadium: Stade Bollaert-Delelis; Attendance: 38,157; Referee: François Letexier

20 April 2025 30	Brest	1–3	Lens	Brest
17:15 CEST (UTC+2)	Lees-Melou 13'; Ndiaye (red card) 45+5'	Report	Koyalipou 17'; El Aynaoui 45+7' (pen.); Saïd 90'	Stadium: Stade Francis-Le Blé; Attendance: 15,049; Referee: Benoît Millot

27 April 2025 31	Lens	0–4	Auxerre	Lens
17:15 CEST (UTC+2)	Bah 43'; Agbonifo (yellow card) 55'; Thomasson (yellow card) 75'; Aguilar (yellow card) 81'; Sotoca (red card) 85'	Report	Onaiwu 33', 44', (yellow card) 45'; Perrin 40'; Massengo (yellow card) 50'; Léon (yellow card) 52'; Hoever 73'; Maddy (yellow card) 90+1'	Stadium: Stade Bollaert-Delelis; Attendance: 38,193; Referee: Mathieu Vernice

4 May 2025 32	Lyon	1–2	Lens	Décines-Charpieu
17:15 CEST (UTC+2)	Niakhaté (yellow card) 13'; Fofana (yellow card) 45+2'; Mikautadze 79'	Report	Koyalipou 21'; Mendy (yellow card) 54'; Machado (yellow card) 64'; Zaroury 85'; Medina (yellow card) 89'	Stadium: Parc Olympique Lyonnais; Attendance: 52,020; Referee: Jérémy Stinat

10 May 2025 33	Toulouse	1–1	Lens	Toulouse
21:00 CEST (UTC+2)	Gboho 47'; Dønnum (yellow card) 63'; Cásseres Jr. (yellow card) 87'	Report	Thomasson (yellow card) 51'; Medina (yellow card) 57'; Mendy (yellow card) 60'; El Aynaoui 61'; Saïd (yellow card) 87'; Zaroury (yellow card) 88'	Stadium: Stadium de Toulouse; Attendance: 27,890; Referee: Bastien Dechepy

17 May 2025 34	Lens	4–0	Monaco	Lens
21:00 CEST (UTC+2)	El Aynaoui 21', 56'; Medina (yellow card) 43'; Thomasson 73'; Zaroury 78'	Report	Diatta (yellow card) 45+1'; Magassa (red card) 52'	Stadium: Stade Bollaert-Delelis; Attendance: 38,160; Referee: François Letexier

=== Coupe de France ===
22 December 2024 Round of 64	Lens	1–1 (3–4 p)	Paris Saint-Germain	Lens
21:00	Nzola 66'; Khusanov (yellow card) 75'	Report	Marquinhos (yellow card) 67'; Ramos 70'	Stadium: Stade Bollaert-Delelis; Attendance: 38,182; Referee: Thomas Léonard
	Penalties
	Frankowski (penalty scored); Sotoca (penalty scored); El Aynaoui (penalty scored); Nzola (penalty missed); Diouf (penalty missed)		(penalty scored) Vitinha; (penalty scored) Ramos; (penalty scored) Dembélé; (penalty scored) Barcola

=== UEFA Conference League ===
==== Play-off round ====
The draw for the play-off round was held on 5 August 2024.

22 August 2024 First leg	Lens (France)	2–1	(Greece) Panathinaikos	Lens
21:00 CEST (UTC+2)	Frankowski 4', (yellow card) 90+8'; Medina (yellow card) 13', (red card) 20'; Saïd 34'; Danso (yellow card) 82'	Report	Tetê (yellow card) 44'; Ioannidis 53'; Gnezda Čerin (yellow card) 71'; Vagiannidis (yellow card) 83'	Stadium: Stade Bollaert-Delelis; Attendance: 37,232; Referee: Gergo Bogár (Hungary)

29 August 2024 Second leg	Panathinaikos (Greece)	2–0 (3–2 agg.)	(France) Lens	Athens, Greece
21:00 EEST (UTC+3)	Tetê (yellow card) 19', (goal) 85'; Pellistri 62'	Report	Frankowski (yellow card) 10'; Sotoca (penalty missed) 15'; Gradit (yellow card) 53'	Stadium: Olympic Stadium; Attendance: 58,500; Referee: Juan Martínez Munuera (Spain)
