= Justin Bourgault =

French footballer (born 2005)

Personal information
- Date of birth: 14 September 2005 (age 21)
- Place of birth: Saint-Brieuc, France
- Position: Left-back

Team information
- Current team: Brest
- Number: 18

Youth career
- 2012–2015: ES HDB Emeraude
- 2015–2020: Lamballe FC
- 2020–2022: Stade Briochin

Senior career*
Years	Team	Apps	(Gls)
2022–2023	Stade Briochin II	29	(1)
2023–2024	Stade Briochin	23	(1)
2024–2025	Concarneau	12	(1)
2025–	Brest	2	(1)

International career^{‡}
2025–	France U20	7	(0)
- * Club domestic league appearances and goals as of 07:16, 1 April 2025 (UTC) ‡ National team caps and goals as of 23:30, 15 October 2025 (UTC)

Justin Bourgault (born 14 September 2005) is a French professional footballer who plays as a left-back for Ligue 1 club Brest.

== Club career ==
Bourgault played for Stade Briochin in the Championnat National 2 before signing for Championnat National club Concarneau in 2024. On 24 January 2025, he signed for Ligue 1 club Brest on a 4.5-year contract. He scored his first goal for the club in a 4–2 defeat to Toulouse on 30 March 2025.

== International career ==
In March 2025, Bourgault was called up to the France under-20s by head coach Bernard Diomède for friendlies against Japan and Mexico.
