= Tom Pouilly =

French footballer (born 2003)

Personal information
- Full name: Tom Tony Pouilly
- Date of birth: 18 June 2003 (age 23)
- Place of birth: Liévin, France
- Height: 1.80 m (5 ft 11 in)
- Positions: Right wing-back; midfielder

Team information
- Current team: Pau
- Number: 2

Youth career
- –2010: US Cuincy
- 2010–2021: Lens

Senior career*
Years	Team	Apps	(Gls)
2021–2025	Lens B	78	(13)
2024–2025	Lens	10	(0)
2025–	Pau	31	(3)
- * Club domestic league appearances and goals as of 11 May 2026

Tom Tony Pouilly (born 18 June 2003) is a French professional footballer who plays as a right wing-back and midfielder for Ligue 2 club Pau.

== Career ==
Born in Liévin, Pouilly grew up in Nœux-les-Mines. In 2010, he joined Lens from US Cuincy at the age of seven, signing for the club him and his family support. On 6 July 2024, while a regular as a right wing-back for Lens's reserve side, Pouilly signed his first professional contract until 2025. On 10 August 2024, he played in his first senior game, a 3–0 friendly win over Leicester City. On 19 October 2024, he made his Ligue 1 debut in a 2–0 win over Saint-Étienne, coming on as a 90th-minute substitute. He extended his contract with Lens to 2027 on 26 February 2025.

== Career statistics ==
As of match played 17 May 2025

Appearances and goals by club, season and competition
Club	Season	League			Cup		Europe		Other		Total	
Club	Season	Division	Apps	Goals	Apps	Goals	Apps	Goals	Apps	Goals	Apps	Goals
Lens B	2021–22	Championnat National 2	25	2	—		—		—		25	2
Lens B	2022–23	Championnat National 3	21	3	—		—		—		21	3
Lens B	2023–24	Championnat National 3	23	1	—		—		—		23	1
Lens B	2024–25	Championnat National 3	10	8	—		—		—		10	8
Lens B	Total		79	14	—		—		—		79	14
Lens	2024–25	Ligue 1	10	0	0	0	0	0	—		10	0
Career total			89	14	0	0	0	0	0	0	89	14
