= Kembo Diliwidi =

French footballer (born 2006)

Personal information
- Date of birth: 3 February 2006 (age 20)
- Place of birth: Beuvry, France
- Height: 1.80 m (5 ft 11 in)
- Position: Winger

Team information
- Current team: Dender
- Number: 11

Youth career
- 2011–2012: Nœux-les-Mines
- 2013–2014: US Vermelles
- 2014–2024: Lens

Senior career*
Years	Team	Apps	(Gls)
2023–2026	Lens II	27	(8)
2024–2026	Lens	1	(0)
2025	→ Le Mans (loan)	7	(1)
2025–2026	→ Quevilly-Rouen (loan)	24	(3)
2026–	Dender	2	(0)

International career^{‡}
2024–2025	France U19	9	(1)
- * Club domestic league appearances and goals as of 23:20, 10 November 2026 (UTC) ‡ National team caps and goals as of 03:02, 17 August 2025 (UTC)

Kembo Diliwidi (born 3 February 2006) is a French professional football player who plays as a winger for Challenger Pro League club Dender.

== Career ==
Diliwidi is a product of the youth academies of Nœux-les-Mines, US Vermelles and Lens, was promoted to Lens' reserves in 2023. On 10 November 2024, he signed his first professional contract with Lens until 2028. On 3 February 2025, he joined Le Mans on loan for the second half of the 2024–25 season in the Ligue 2. On 16 August 2025, he joined Quevilly-Rouen on loan in the Championnat National for the 2025–26 season.

== International career ==
Born in France, Diliwidi is of DR Congolese descent. He is a youth international for France, having first been called to the France U19s in 2024.

== Career statistics ==
As of match played 8 November 2026

Appearances and goals by club, season and competition
Club	Season	League			National cup (Note: Includes Coupe de France, Belgian Cup)		Europe		Other		Total	
Club	Season	Division	Apps	Goals	Apps	Goals	Apps	Goals	Apps	Goals	Apps	Goals
Lens II	2023–24	CFA	16	4	—		—		—		16	4
Lens II	2024–25	CFA	11	4	—		—		—		11	4
Lens II	Total		27	8	—		—		—		27	8
Lens	2024–25	Ligue 1	1	0	—		—		—		1	0
Le Mans (loan)	2024–25	Ligue 3	7	1	—		—		—		7	1
Quevilly-Rouen (loan)	2025–26	Ligue 3	24	3	2	1	—		—		26	4
Dender	2026–27	Challenger Pro League	2	0	1	0	—		—		3	0
Career total			61	12	3	1	0	0	0	0	64	13
