= Jhoanner Chávez =

Ecuadorian footballer (born 2002)

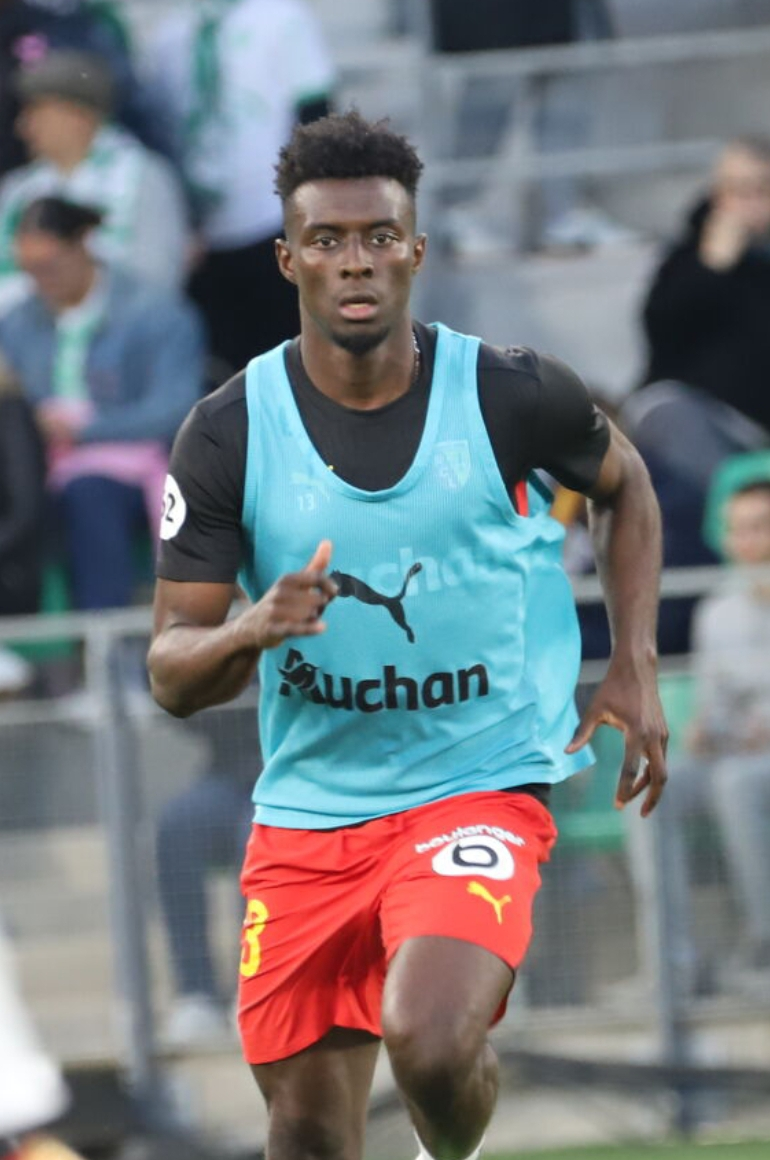
- Chávez with Lens in 2024

Personal information
- Full name: Jhoanner Stalin Chávez Quintero
- Date of birth: 25 April 2002 (age 24)
- Place of birth: Puerto Francisco de Orellana, Ecuador
- Height: 1.82 m (6 ft 0 in)
- Position: Left back

Team information
- Current team: Lens

Youth career
- 2014–2019: Independiente del Valle

Senior career*
| Years | Team | Apps | (Gls) |
| 2020 | Independiente Juniors | 3 | (0) |
| 2020–2022 | Independiente del Valle | 43 | (3) |
| 2023–2024 | Bahia | 19 | (1) |
| 2023 | → Independiente del Valle (loan) | 15 | (2) |
| 2024 | → Lens (loan) | 8 | (0) |
| 2024 | → Lens II (loan) | 1 | (0) |
| 2024– | Lens | 10 | (1) |
| 2026 | → Sparta Prague (loan) | 0 | (0) |

International career^{‡}
| 2019 | Ecuador U17 | 2 | (0) |
| 2022– | Ecuador | 7 | (0) |
- * Club domestic league appearances and goals as of 25 May 2025 ‡ National team caps and goals as of 14 October 2025

Jhoanner Stalin Chávez Quintero (born 25 April 2002) is an Ecuadorian footballer who plays as left back for Ligue 1 club Lens and the Ecuador national team.

== Club career ==
=== Independiente del Valle ===
Born in Puerto Francisco de Orellana, Chávez joined Independiente del Valle's youth setup in 2014, aged 12. After making his senior debut with the reserve team Independiente Juniors, he made his first team debut on 30 September 2020, coming on as a late substitute for Fernando Guerrero in a 4–0 away loss against Flamengo, for the year's Copa Libertadores.

Chávez made his Ecuadorian Serie A debut on 6 December 2020, replacing Luis Segovia in a 2–0 home win over El Nacional. He scored his first professional goal on 2 April 2022, netting his team's second in a 3–1 away success over Gualaceo.

=== Bahia ===
On 7 January 2023, Chávez was announced at Campeonato Brasileiro Série A side Bahia on a five-year contract.

==== Loan to Lens ====
On 9 January 2024, Chávez joined Ligue 1 club Lens on loan, with a buyout clause.

==== Loan to Sparta Prague ====
On 9 February 2026, Chávez joined Czech First League club Sparta Prague on a half-year loan deal with a buyout clause.

== International career ==
After representing Ecuador at under-17 level, Chávez received his first call-up for the full side on 9 November 2022, for a friendly against Iraq. He made his full international debut three days later, coming on as a half-time substitute for Félix Torres in a 0–0 draw at the Metropolitano Stadium in Madrid.

== Career statistics ==
=== Club ===
As of 5 January 2025

| Club | Season | League | | | State League | | Cup | | Continental | | Other | | Total | |
| Club | Season | Division | Apps | Goals | Apps | Goals | Apps | Goals | Apps | Goals | Apps | Goals | Apps | Goals |
|---|---|---|---|---|---|---|---|---|---|---|---|---|---|---|
| Independiente Juniors | 2020 | Ecuadorian Serie B | 3 | 0 | — | | — | | — | | — | | 3 | 0 |
| Independiente del Valle (loan) | 2020 | Ecuadorian Serie A | 1 | 0 | — | | 1 (Note: Appearance(s) in Copa Libertadores) | 0 | — | | 0 | 0 | 2 | 0 |
| Independiente del Valle (loan) | 2021 | Ecuadorian Serie A | 21 | 0 | — | | 7 | 0 | — | | 1 (Note: Appearance(s) in Supercopa Ecuador) | 0 | 29 | 0 |
| Independiente del Valle (loan) | 2022 | Ecuadorian Serie A | 21 | 3 | 10 | 2 | 13 (Note: Six appearances and one goal in Copa Libertadores, seven appearances and one goal in Copa Sudamericana) | 2 | — | | — | | 44 | 7 |
| Independiente del Valle (loan) | 2023 | Ecuadorian Serie A | 15 | 2 | — | | 0 | 0 | 0 | 0 | — | | 15 | 2 |
| Independiente del Valle (loan) | Total | | 58 | 5 | 10 | 2 | 21 | 2 | — | | 1 | 0 | 90 | 9 |
| Bahia | 2023 | Série A | 10 | 0 | 9 (Note: Appearance(s) in Campeonato Baiano) | 0 | 5 | 0 | — | | 5 (Note: Appearance(s) in Copa do Nordeste) | 1 | 29 | 1 |
| Lens (loan) | 2023–24 | Ligue 1 | 8 | 0 | — | | 0 | 0 | 2 (Note: Appearances in UEFA Europa League) | 0 | — | | 10 | 0 |
| Lens II | 2023–24 | National 3 | 1 | 0 | — | | — | | — | | — | | 1 | 0 |
| Lens | 2024–25 | Ligue 1 | 10 | 1 | — | | 1 | 0 | 2 | 0 | — | | 13 | 1 |
| Lens | 2026–27 | Ligue 1 | 0 | 0 | — | | 0 | 0 | 0 | 0 | 0 | 0 | 0 | 0 |
| Lens | Total | | 10 | 1 | — | | 1 | 0 | 2 | 0 | 0 | 0 | 13 | 1 |
| Sparta Prague (loan) | 2025–26 | Czech First League | 0 | 0 | — | | 0 | 0 | 0 | 0 | — | | 0 | 0 |
| Career total | | | 90 | 6 | 19 | 2 | 27 | 3 | 4 | 0 | 6 | 1 | 146 | 11 |

=== International ===
As of 14 October 2025

Ecuador
| Year | Apps | Goals |
|---|---|---|
| 2022 | 1 | 0 |
| 2023 | 2 | 0 |
| 2024 | 3 | 0 |
| 2025 | 1 | 0 |
| Total | 7 | 0 |

== Honours ==
Independiente del Valle

- Ecuadorian Serie A: 2021
- Copa Sudamericana: 2022
- Copa Ecuador: 2022

Bahia

- Campeonato Baiano: 2023
