= Mathys Niflore =

French footballer

Personal information
- Full name: Mathys Sauveur Niflore
- Date of birth: 2 March 2007 (age 19)
- Place of birth: Paray-le-Monial, France
- Height: 1.92 m (6 ft 4 in)
- Position: Goalkeeper

Team information
- Current team: Toulouse
- Number: 60

Youth career
- 2012–2013: Nîmes
- 2013–2014: AS Lagardellois
- 2014–2015: Muret
- 2015–2024: Toulouse

Senior career*
| Years | Team | Apps | (Gls) |
| 2024– | Toulouse II | 14 | (0) |
| 2025– | Toulouse | 0 | (0) |
| 2025–2026 | → Dunkerque (loan) | 26 | (0) |

International career^{‡}
| 2022 | France U16 | 3 | (0) |
| 2023–2024 | France U17 | 3 | (0) |
| 2023 | France U18 | 3 | (0) |
| 2024– | France U19 | 8 | (0) |
- * Club domestic league appearances and goals as of 11 May 2026 ‡ National team caps and goals as of 31 March 2026

Mathys Sauveur Niflore (born 2 March 2007) is a French professional footballer who plays as a goalkeeper for Ligue 1 club Toulouse.

== Club career ==
Niflore is a product of the youth academies of the French clubs Nîmes, AS Lagardellois, Muret, and Toulouse. On 28 June 2024, he signed a professional contract with Toulouse for 5 seasons and was promoted to their reserves. On 5 July 2025, he joined Dunkerque on a year-long loan in Ligue 2.

== International career ==
Niflore was called up to the France U17s for the 2023 UEFA European Under-17 Championship and the 2023 FIFA U-17 World Cup, finishing as runner-up in both. He returned with the U17s for the 2024 UEFA European Under-17 Championship.

== Personal life ==
Niflore is the son of the football manager and former player Wilfried Niflore.
