= Rémy Labeau Lascary =

French footballer (born 2003)

Personal information
- Date of birth: 3 March 2003 (age 23)
- Place of birth: Les Abymes, Guadeloupe, France
- Height: 1.84 m (6 ft 0 in)
- Position: Forward

Team information
- Current team: Auxerre (on loan from Lens)
- Number: 3

Youth career
- Stade Lamentinois
- 2018–2021: Lens

Senior career*
| Years | Team | Apps | (Gls) |
| 2021–2023 | Lens B | 41 | (15) |
| 2022– | Lens | 24 | (2) |
| 2023–2024 | → Laval (loan) | 35 | (4) |
| 2025–2026 | → Brest (loan) | 27 | (5) |
| 2026– | → Auxerre (loan) | 0 | (0) |
- * Club domestic league appearances and goals as of 19 May 2026

Rémy Labeau Lascary (born 3 March 2003) is a French professional footballer who plays as a forward for Ligue 1 club Auxerre on loan from Lens.

== Career ==
Labeau Lascary began his career with the Guadeloupean club Stade Lamentinois, before moving to the youth academy of Lens in 2018. He began his senior career with the Lens reserves in 2021, and started regularly training with the first team in December 2022. He made his professional debut with Lens as a late substitute in a 0–0 Ligue 1 tie with OGC Nice on 29 December 2022.

On 9 January 2023, he signed his first professional contract with RC Lens until 2026.

On 25 August 2025, Labeau Lascary moved on loan to Angers. However, that loan was quickly cancelled and six days later Labeau Lascary moved on loan to Brest instead. On 27 July 2026, he moved on a new loan to Auxerre, with an option to buy.

== Career statistics ==
As of match played 17 May 2026

Appearances and goals by club, season and competition
| Club | Season | League | | | Cup | | Europe | | Other | | Total | |
| Club | Season | Division | Apps | Goals | Apps | Goals | Apps | Goals | Apps | Goals | Apps | Goals |
|---|---|---|---|---|---|---|---|---|---|---|---|---|
| Lens B | 2021–22 | CFA | 25 | 4 | — | | — | | — | | 25 | 4 |
| Lens B | 2022–23 | National 2 | 16 | 11 | — | | — | | — | | 16 | 11 |
| Lens B | Total | | 41 | 15 | — | | — | | — | | 41 | 15 |
| Lens | 2022–23 | Ligue 1 | 10 | 0 | 2 | 0 | — | | — | | 12 | 0 |
| Lens | 2024–25 | Ligue 1 | 14 | 2 | 0 | 0 | 2 (Note: Appearances in UEFA Europa League) | 0 | — | | 16 | 2 |
| Lens | 2026–27 | Ligue 1 | 0 | 0 | 0 | 0 | 0 | 0 | 0 | 0 | 0 | 0 |
| Lens | Total | | 24 | 2 | 2 | 0 | 2 | 0 | — | | 28 | 2 |
| Stade Lavallois (loan) | 2023–24 | Ligue 2 | 35 | 4 | 4 | 0 | — | | — | | 39 | 4 |
| Brest (loan) | 2025–26 | Ligue 1 | 27 | 5 | 1 | 1 | — | | — | | 28 | 6 |
| Career total | | | 127 | 26 | 7 | 1 | 2 | 0 | 0 | 0 | 136 | 27 |
