= Soumaïla Coulibaly (footballer, born 2003) =

French footballer

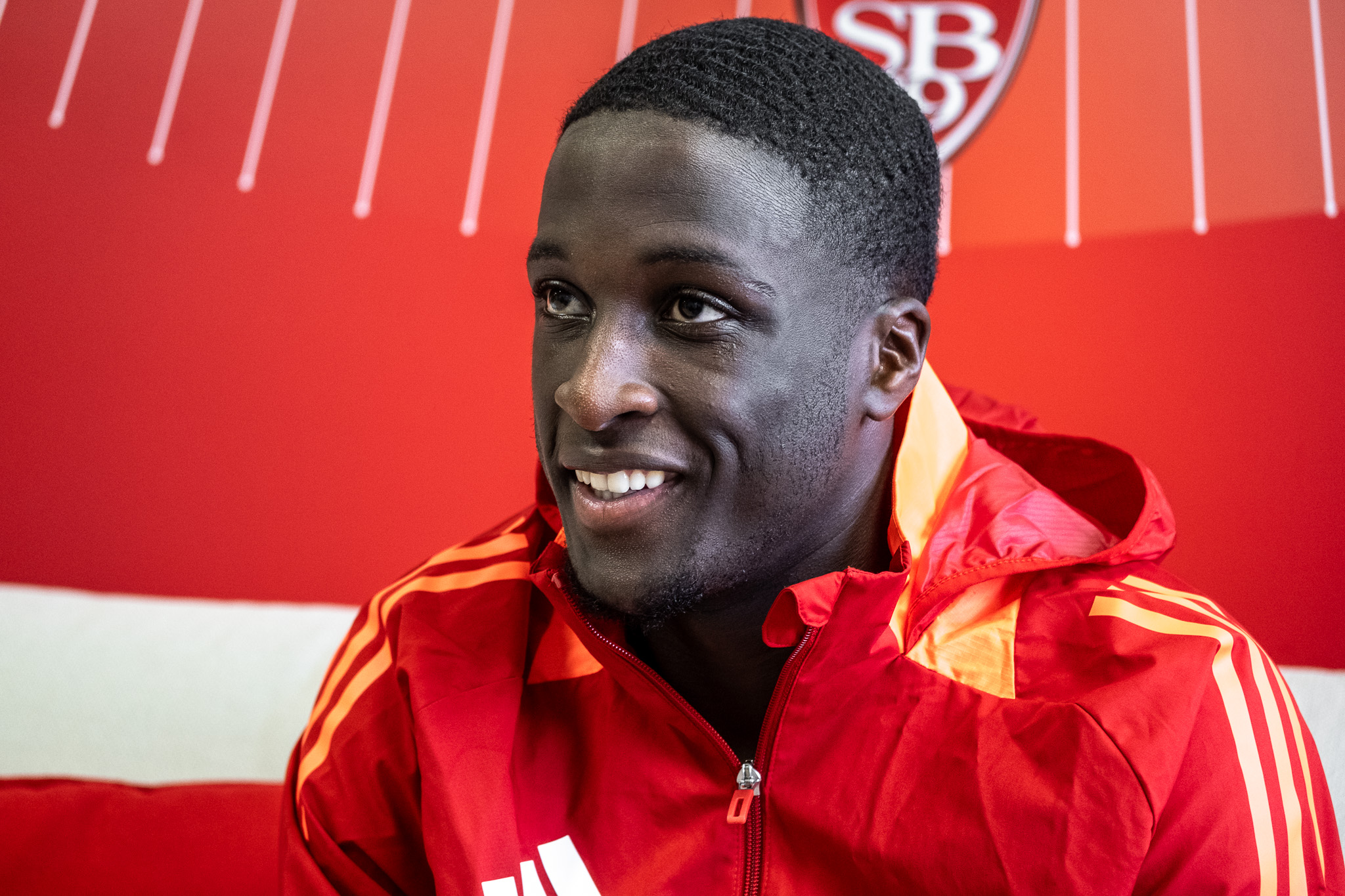
- Coulibaly with Brest in 2024

Personal information
- Date of birth: 14 October 2003 (age 23)
- Place of birth: Montfermeil, France
- Height: 1.90 m (6 ft 3 in)
- Position: Centre-back

Team information
- Current team: Watford (on loan from Strasbourg)
- Number: 3

Youth career
- 2015–2018: FC Montfermeil
- 2018–2021: Paris Saint-Germain

Senior career*
Years	Team	Apps	(Gls)
2021–2025	Borussia Dortmund II	25	(0)
2022–2025	Borussia Dortmund	1	(0)
2023–2024	→ Antwerp (loan)	22	(0)
2024–2025	→ Brest (loan)	7	(0)
2025–	Strasbourg	1	(0)
2025–2026	→ Brest (loan)	16	(0)
2026–	→ Watford (loan)	5	(0)

International career
2019	France U16	2	(0)
2019	France U17	2	(0)
2022	France U20	4	(0)
- * Club domestic league appearances and goals as of 22 October 2026 (UTC)

Soumaïla Coulibaly (born 14 October 2003) is a French professional footballer who plays as a centre-back for EFL Championship club Watford, on loan from Ligue 1 club Strasbourg.

== Club career ==
=== Borussia Dortmund ===
Coulibaly is a product of the Paris Saint-Germain Academy. However, he never signed a professional contract with Paris Saint-Germain because he rejected the chance to do so, instead preferring to sign for Borussia Dortmund in Germany. In an interview with Le Parisien in March 2021, Coulibaly explained his decision to leave Paris, stating that "there is not much space for [young players at PSG]" and that the "quality of the PSG squad, which signs lots of great players, makes it very difficult for youngsters to succeed". He joined Dortmund upon the expiration of his contract on 1 July 2021.

Coulibaly made his first appearance in a UEFA Champions League match on 2 November 2022 against Copenhagen, and in the Bundesliga against VfB Stuttgart on 15 April 2023.

==== Loan to Antwerp ====
On 11 August 2023, Coulibaly joined Royal Antwerp in Belgium on a season-long loan with an option to buy.

==== Loan to Brest ====
On 29 August 2024, Coulibaly moved on a new loan to Brest.

Following the loan, Coulibaly was included in Borussia's squad for the 2025 FIFA Club World Cup, but remained on the bench in all games as Borussia was eliminated in the quarterfinals.

=== Strasbourg ===
On 7 July 2025, Coulibaly signed a four-year contract with Strasbourg.

==== Second loan to Brest ====
On 5 October 2025, Coulibaly was loaned to Brest until the end of the season.

==== Loan to Watford ====
On 1 August 2026, Coulibably was loaned to English club Watford until the end of the season, with an option to make the deal permanent.

== International career ==
Coulibaly has been capped by France at under-16 and under-17 level.

== Personal life ==
Born in France, Coulibaly is of Malian descent.

== Career statistics ==
As of match played 12 September 2026

Appearances and goals by club, season and competition
Club	Season	League			National cup (Note: Includes DFB-Pokal, Belgian Cup, Coupe de France, FA Cup)		Europe		Other		Total	
Club	Season	Division	Apps	Goals	Apps	Goals	Apps	Goals	Apps	Goals	Apps	Goals
Borussia Dortmund II	2021–22	3. Liga	9	0	—		—		—		9	0
Borussia Dortmund II	2022–23	3. Liga	16	0	—		—		—		16	0
Borussia Dortmund II	Total		25	0	—		—		—		25	0
Borussia Dortmund	2022–23	Bundesliga	1	0	0	0	1 (Note: Appearances in UEFA Champions League)	0	—		2	0
Borussia Dortmund	2024–25	Bundesliga	—		—		—		0	0	0	0
Borussia Dortmund	Total		1	0	0	0	1	0	0	0	2	0
Antwerp (loan)	2023–24	Belgian Pro League	22	0	4	0	8	0	—		34	0
Brest (loan)	2024–25	Ligue 1	7	0	1	0	8	0	—		16	0
Strasbourg	2025–26	Ligue 1	0	0	0	0	1 (Note: Appearances in UEFA Conference League)	0	—		1	0
Strasbourg	2026–27	Ligue 1	0	0	0	0	—		—		0	0
Strasbourg	Total		0	0	0	0	1	0	—		1	0
Brest (loan)	2025–26	Ligue 1	16	0	—		—		—		16	0
Watford (loan)	2026–27	EFL Championship	3	0	0	0	—		0	0	3	0
Career total			74	0	5	0	18	0	0	0	97	0
