= Abdoulaye Ndiaye (footballer) =

Senegalese footballer (born 2002)

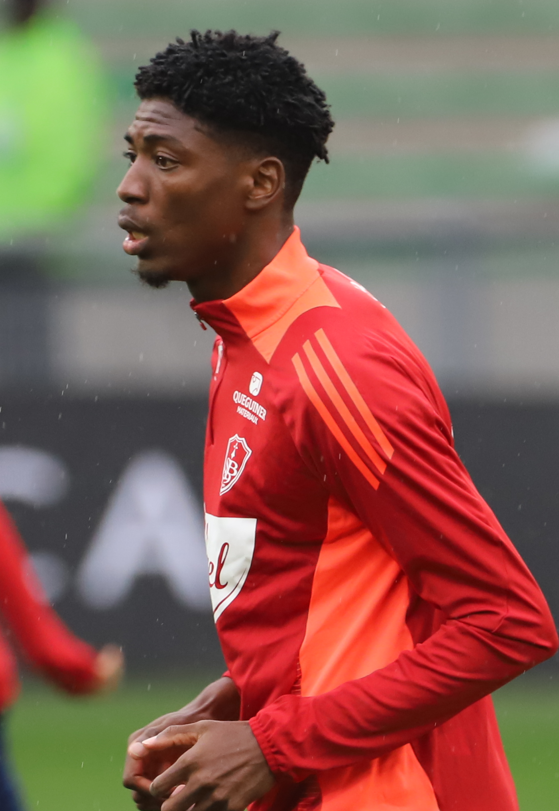
- Ndiaye with Brest in 2025

Personal information
- Full name: Abdoulaye Niakhaté Ndiaye
- Date of birth: 10 April 2002 (age 24)
- Place of birth: Boune, Senegal
- Height: 1.95 m (6 ft 5 in)
- Position: Centre-back

Team information
- Current team: Parma
- Number: 3

Youth career
- –2020: Dakar Sacré-Cœur
- 2020–2022: Lyon

Senior career*
Years	Team	Apps	(Gls)
2020–2023	Lyon B	17	(0)
2022–2023	→ Bastia (loan)	28	(1)
2023–2025	Troyes	31	(0)
2024–2025	→ Brest (loan)	22	(1)
2025–	Parma	11	(0)

International career^{‡}
2019	Senegal U20	1	(0)
2022	Senegal U23	1	(0)
2024–	Senegal	1	(0)
- * Club domestic league appearances and goals as of 25 May 2026 ‡ National team caps and goals as of 06:42, 16 January 2024 (UTC)

Abdoulaye Niakhaté Ndiaye (born 10 April 2002) is a Senegalese professional footballer who plays as a centre-back for Serie A club Parma and the Senegal national team.

== Club career ==
A youth product of Dakar Sacré-Cœur, Ndiaye signed with the youth academy of Lyon in 2020. On 16 June 2022, he signed on loan with Ligue 2 side Bastia. He made his professional debut with Bastia in a 4–1 league win over Niort on 6 August 2022, a game in which he scored from a header.

On 20 July 2023, Ndiaye signed for Ligue 2 club Troyes on a five-year contract. Lyon received a transfer fee of €3.5 million, in addition to a 20% sell-on clause.

On 24 July 2024, Ndiaye joined Ligue 1 club Brest on a season-long loan deal with an option to buy for €8 million.

On 4 August 2025, Ndiaye signed a five-year contract with Parma in Italy.

== International career ==
On 1 September 2023, Ndiaye received his first call-up to the Senegal national team.

In December 2023, he was named in Senegal's squad for the postponed 2023 Africa Cup of Nations held in the Ivory Coast.
