= List of French football transfers summer 2022 =

This is a list of French football transfers for the 2022–23 summer transfer window. Only transfers featuring Ligue 1 and Ligue 2 are listed.

== Transfers ==
Date	Name	Moving from	Moving to	Fee
28 April 2022	(Paraguay) Andrés Cubas	Nîmes	(United States) Vancouver Whitecaps FC	$3m
23 May 2022	(France) Boubacar Kamara	Marseille	(England) Aston Villa	Free
23 May 2022	(France) Théo Sainte-Luce	Nîmes	Montpellier	Free
25 May 2022	(France) Clément Billemaz	Louhans-Cuiseaux	Annecy	Undisclosed
28 May 2022	(Portugal) Mathias Pereira Lage	Angers	Brest	Free
31 May 2022	(Portugal) Nuno Mendes	(Portugal) Sporting CP	Paris Saint-Germain	£38m
1 June 2022	(France) Himad Abdelli	Le Havre	Angers	Undisclosed
1 June 2022	(Poland) Marcin Bułka	Paris Saint-Germain	Nice	£2m
1 June 2022	(France) Roli Pereira de Sa	Nantes	Sochaux	Free
2 June 2022	(France) Antoine Valério	Nîmes	Rodez	Free
3 June 2022	(Martinique) Kévin Farade	Créteil	Annecy	Undisclosed
4 June 2022	(Slovenia) Miha Blažič	(Hungary) Ferencváros	Angers	Undisclosed
4 June 2022	(France) Sébastien Cibois	Brest	Rodez	Free
4 June 2022	(France) François Lajugie	Borgo	Annecy	Undisclosed
8 June 2022	(France) Florent Mollet	Montpellier	(Germany) Schalke 04	€700k
8 June 2022	(France) Alexandre Phliponeau	Marseille	Annecy	Undisclosed
9 June 2022	(France) Alexandre Lacazette	(England) Arsenal	Lyon	Free
10 June 2022	(France) Jean Ruiz	(Switzerland) Sion	Pau	Undisclosed
10 June 2022	(France) Amine Salama	Dunkerque	Angers	Undisclosed
13 June 2022	(Senegal) Pape Meïssa Ba	Red Star	Grenoble	Undisclosed
13 June 2022	(Brazil) Neto Borges	(Belgium) Genk	Clermont Foot	Undisclosed
13 June 2022	(France) Thomas Mangani	Angers	Ajaccio	Free
13 June 2022	(France) Arnaud Nordin	Saint-Étienne	Montpellier	Free
14 June 2022	(France) Mory Diaw	(Switzerland) Lausanne-Sport	Clermont Foot	Undisclosed
14 June 2022	(Cameroon) Aloys Fouda	Caen	Châteauroux	Undisclosed
15 June 2022	(France) Mohamed-Ali Cho	Angers	(Spain) Real Sociedad	€15m
16 June 2022	(Ivory Coast) Emmanuel Agbadou	(Belgium) Eupen	Reims	Undisclosed
16 June 2022	(France) Yoël Armougom	Caen	Sochaux	Undisclosed
16 June 2022	(France) Maxime Bastian	Strasbourg	Annecy	Loan
16 June 2022	(France) Walid Jarmouni	Sochaux	Pau	Undisclosed
16 June 2022	(Comoros) Youssouf M'Changama	EA Guingamp	Auxerre	Undisclosed
16 June 2022	(France) Daylam Meddah	Angers	Sochaux	Undisclosed
16 June 2022	(Senegal) Abdoulaye Ndiaye	Lyon	Bastia	Loan
17 June 2022	(Morocco) Alaa Bellaarouch	Strasbourg	Stade Briochin	Loan
17 June 2022	(France) Steve Shamal	Caen	Annecy	Undisclosed
17 June 2022	(France) Romain Thomas	Angers	Caen	Free
18 June 2022	(France) Jean-Kévin Augustin	Nantes	(Switzerland) Basel	Undisclosed
18 June 2022	(France) Quentin Daubin	Pau	Caen	Undisclosed
20 June 2022	(Morocco) Nayef Aguerd	Rennes	(England) West Ham United	£30m
20 June 2022	(France) Abdourahmane Barry	(Germany) Greuther Fürth	Amiens	Free
20 June 2022	(France) Thomas Callens	Lorient	Annecy	Loan
20 June 2022	(France) Dylan Chambost	Troyes	Saint-Étienne	Free
20 June 2022	(Senegal) Elhadji Pape Diaw	(Ukraine) Rukh Lviv	Stade Laval	Loan
20 June 2022	(France) Samuel Essende	Pau	Caen	Undisclosed
20 June 2022	(France) Romain Hamouma	Saint-Étienne	Ajaccio	Free
21 June 2022	(Argentina) Walter Benítez	Nice	(Netherlands) PSV	Undisclosed
21 June 2022	(France) Mehdi Chahiri	Strasbourg	Paris	Loan
21 June 2022	(Senegal) Donatien Gomis	Concarneau	EA Guingamp	Undisclosed
21 June 2022	(France) Julien Maggiotti	Laval	(Belgium) Charleroi	Undisclosed
21 June 2022	(France) Julien Maggiotti	(Belgium) Charleroi	Laval	Loan
21 June 2022	(France) Faitout Maouassa	(Belgium) Club Brugge	Montpellier	Loan
21 June 2022	(France) Walid Nassi	Stade Briochin	Dijon	Undisclosed
21 June 2022	(France) Kevin Tapoko	(Israel) Hapoel Haifa	Laval	Undisclosed
21 June 2022	(France) Kevin Van Den Kerkhof	(Luxembourg) F91 Dudelange	Bastia	Undisclosed
21 June 2022	(Turkey) Burak Yılmaz	Lille	(Netherlands) Fortuna Sittard	Undisclosed
22 June 2022	(France) Anthony Briançon	Nîmes	Saint-Étienne	Free
22 June 2022	(France) Johann Lepenant	Caen	Lyon	Undisclosed
22 June 2022	(Ghana) Emmanuel Ntim	Valenciennes	Caen	Undisclosed
22 June 2022	(France) Balthazar Pierret	(Romania) Dinamo București	Quevilly-Rouen	Free
23 June 2022	(Haiti) Carlens Arcus	Auxerre	(Netherlands) Vitesse	Undisclosed
23 June 2022	(France) Marvin Elimbi	Strasbourg	Orléans	Loan
23 June 2022	(Algeria) Anthony Mandrea	Angers	Caen	Undisclosed
24 June 2022	(Morocco) Zakaria Aboukhlal	(Netherlands) AZ	Toulouse	Undisclosed
24 June 2022	(France) Alexandre Bonnet	Le Havre	Quevilly-Rouen	Free
24 June 2022	(France) Jimmy Giraudon	Troyes	Saint-Étienne	Free
24 June 2022	(France) Pierre-Yves Hamel	Lorient	Paris	Undisclosed
24 June 2022	(Comoros) Iyad Mohamed	Auxerre	Caen	Undisclosed
24 June 2022	(France) Sullivan Péan	Caen	Dunkerque	Loan
24 June 2022	(Guinea) Florentin Pogba	Sochaux	(India) ATK Mohun Bagan	Undisclosed
24 June 2022	(Ecuador) Jackson Porozo	(Portugal) Boavista	Troyes	Undisclosed
24 June 2022	(Ghana) Salis Abdul Samed	Clermont Foot	Lens	Undisclosed
24 June 2022	(Switzerland) Kevin Spadanuda	(Switzerland) Aarau	Ajaccio	Undisclosed
24 June 2022	(Cameroon) Darlin Yongwa	Niort	Lorient	Undisclosed
26 June 2022	(France) Paul Lasne	Brest	Paris	Free
27 June 2022	(France) Migouel Alfarela	Paris	Bastia	Undisclosed
27 June 2022	(France) Alphonse Areola	Paris Saint-Germain	(England) West Ham United	£10.5m
27 June 2022	(Burkina Faso) Mamady Bangré	Toulouse	Quevilly-Rouen	Loan
27 June 2022	(France) Bilal Brahimi	Dunkerque	Caen	Undisclosed
27 June 2022	(France) Till Cissokho	Clermont Foot	Quevilly-Rouen	Free
27 June 2022	(Senegal) Christophe Diedhiou	Sochaux	Quevilly-Rouen	Free
27 June 2022	(France) Elias Filet	Sochaux	(Luxembourg) Progrès Niederkorn	Loan
27 June 2022	(France) Andréas Hountondji	Caen	Quevilly-Rouen	Loan
27 June 2022	(Tunisia) Wahbi Khazri	Saint-Étienne	Montpellier	Free
27 June 2022	(France) Julien Le Cardinal	Bastia	Paris	Undisclosed
27 June 2022	(France) Marvin Tshibuabua	Saint-Étienne	(Belgium) RFC Seraing	Undisclosed
27 June 2022	(Mali) Sambou Yatabaré	Valenciennes	Sochaux	Undisclosed
28 June 2022	(Norway) Kjetil Haug	(Norway) Vålerenga	Toulouse	Undisclosed
28 June 2022	(Japan) Takumi Minamino	(England) Liverpool	Monaco	£15m
28 June 2022	(France) Sikou Niakaté	EA Guingamp	(Portugal) Braga	Loan
28 June 2022	(Ivory Coast) Jena N'Guessan	Nice	Nîmes	Loan
28 June 2022	(Gabon) Johann Obiang	Rodez	Caen	Undisclosed
28 June 2022	(Serbia) Strahinja Pavlović	Monaco	(Austria) Red Bull Salzburg	Undisclosed
28 June 2022	(Netherlands) Xavi Simons	Paris Saint-Germain	(Netherlands) PSV	Undisclosed
29 June 2022	(Ivory Coast) Kouadio Ange Ahoussou	Nice	Châteauroux	Loan
29 June 2022	(Mali) Moussa Doumbia	Reims	Sochaux	Free
29 June 2022	(Belgium) Baptiste Guillaume	Valenciennes	EA Guingamp	Undisclosed
29 June 2022	(France) Adrien Hunou	(United States) Minnesota United FC	Angers	Undisclosed
29 June 2022	(France) Corentin Jean	Lens	(United States) Inter Miami CF	Undisclosed
29 June 2022	(Italy) Pietro Pellegri	Monaco	(Italy) Torino	Undisclosed
29 June 2022	(Guadeloupe) Matthias Phaëton	EA Guingamp	Grenoble	Undisclosed
29 June 2022	(South Africa) Lebogang Phiri	(Turkey) Çaykur Rizespor	Paris	Loan
29 June 2022	(Vietnam) Nguyễn Quang Hải	(Vietnam) Hanoi	Pau	Undisclosed
29 June 2022	(Bosnia and Herzegovina) Halid Šabanović	(Bosnia and Herzegovina) Sarajevo	Angers	Undisclosed
29 June 2022	(France) Sam Sanna	Toulouse	Laval	Loan
29 June 2022	(France) Mahamé Siby	Strasbourg	(Sweden) Malmö FF	Undisclosed
30 June 2022	(Gabon) Ulrick Eneme Ella	(England) Brighton & Hove Albion	Angers	Undisclosed
30 June 2022	(Senegal) Yannick Gomis	EA Guingamp	(Cyprus) Aris Limassol	Undisclosed
30 June 2022	(France) Ibrahim Sissoko	Niort	Sochaux	Free
30 June 2022	(France) Titouan Thomas	Lyon	(Portugal) Estoril Praia	Undisclosed
30 June 2022	(France) Isaak Touré	Le Havre	Marseille	Undisclosed
30 June 2022	(Portugal) Vitinha	(Portugal) Porto	Paris Saint-Germain	£34m
30 June 2022	(Algeria) Akim Zedadka	Clermont Foot	Lille	Free
1 July 2022	(France) Randal Kolo Muani	Nantes	(Germany) Eintracht Frankfurt	Free
1 July 2022	(Serbia) Mihailo Ristić	Montpellier	(Portugal) Benfica	Free
1 July 2022	(France) Junior Sambia	Montpellier	Free agent	Free
1 July 2022	(Cameroon) Ambroise Oyongo	Montpellier	Free agent	Free
1 July 2022	(Canada) Diyaeddine Abzi	(Canada) York United	Pau	Undisclosed
1 July 2022	(France) Aurélien Tchouaméni	Monaco	(Spain) Real Madrid	€80m
1 July 2022	(France) Saad Agouzoul	Lille	Sochaux	Undsiclosed
1 July 2022	(Guadeloupe) Mickaël Alphonse	(Israel) Maccabi Haifa	Ajaccio	Undisclosed
1 July 2022	(Netherlands) Sven Botman	Lille	(England) Newcastle United	€37m
1 July 2022	(France) Nicolas Benezet	(United States) Seattle Sounders FC	Nîmes	Free
1 July 2022	(France) Quentin Braat	Chamois Niortais	(Spain) Real Oviedo	Free
1 July 2022	(Netherlands) Thijs Dallinga	(Netherlands) Excelsior	Toulouse	Undisclosed
1 July 2022	(France) Maël de Gevigney	Versailles	Nîmes	Free
1 July 2022	(France) Guillaume Dietsch	Metz	(Belgium) RFC Seraing	Loan
1 July 2022	(France) Maxime Gonalons	(Spain) Granada	Clermont Foot	Free
1 July 2022	(France) Matteo Guendouzi	(England) Arsenal	Marseille	£9m
1 July 2022	(France) Ronny Labonne	Lorient	Nîmes	Free
1 July 2022	(Central African Republic) Louis Mafouta	(Switzerland) Neuchâtel Xamax	Quevilly-Rouen	Free
1 July 2022	(France) Axel Maraval	Dunkerque	Nîmes	Free
1 July 2022	(France) Jonas Martin	Rennes	Lille	Free
1 July 2022	(Guinea-Bissau) Joseph Mendes	Niort	Rodez	Free
1 July 2022	(Algeria) Zakaria Naidji	(Algeria) Paradou	Laval	Loan
1 July 2022	(Switzerland) Dan Ndoye	Nice	(Switzerland) Basel	Undisclosed
1 July 2022	(France) Andy Pelmard	Nice	(Switzerland) Basel	Undisclosed
1 July 2022	(Haiti) Frantzdy Pierrot	EA Guingamp	(Israel) Maccabi Haifa	Undisclosed
1 July 2022	(Poland) Łukasz Poręba	(Poland) Zagłębie Lubin	Lens	Free
1 July 2022	(Brazil) Alexsandro Ribeiro	(Portugal) Chaves	Lille	Undisclosed
1 July 2022	(Mali) Falaye Sacko	(Portugal) Vitória de Guimarães	Montpellier	Loan
1 July 2022	(France) Moussa Sissoko	(England) Watford	Nantes	Undisclosed
1 July 2022	(Canada) Justin Smith	Nice	Quevilly-Rouen	Loan
1 July 2022	(France) Malik Tchokounté	Dunkerque	Nîmes	Free
1 July 2022	(France) Corentin Tolisso	(Germany) Bayern Munich	Lyon	Free
1 July 2022	(France) Thibaut Vargas	Châteauroux	Nîmes	Free
2 July 2022	(Belgium) Noah Fadiga	(Netherlands) Heracles	Brest	Undisclosed
3 July 2022	(France) Giulian Biancone	Troyes	(England) Nottingham Forest	£5m
3 July 2022	(Mali) Habib Keïta	Lyon	(Belgium) KV Kortijk	Loan
4 July 2022	(Republic of the Congo) Chadrac Akolo	Amiens	(Switzerland) St. Gallen	Undisclosed
4 July 2022	(Senegal) Aliou Badji	(Egypt) Al Ahly	Amiens	Undisclosed
5 July 2022	(France) Stefan Bajic	Pau	(England) Bristol City	Free
5 July 2022	(Turkey) Zeki Çelik	Lille	(Italy) Roma	€5m
5 July 2022	(England) Karamoko Dembélé	(Scotland) Celtic	Brest	Undisclosed
5 July 2022	(France) Ilyes Najim	Caen	Bourg-en-Bresse	Loan
5 July 2022	(Republic of the Congo) Brice Samba	(England) Nottingham Forest	Lens	Undisclosed
6 July 2022	(France) Colin Dagba	Paris Saint-Germain	Strasbourg	Loan
6 July 2022	(Ivory Coast) Moussa Guel	Valenciennes	Red Star	Undisclosed
6 July 2022	(France) Steve Mandanda	Marseille	Rennes	Free
6 July 2022	(France) Houboulang Mendes	Lorient	(Spain) Almería	Undisclosed
6 July 2022	(Haiti) Duckens Nazon	Quevilly-Rouen	(Bulgaria) CSKA Sofia	Undisclosed
6 July 2022	(Belgium) Loïs Openda	(Belgium) Club Brugge	Lens	Undisclosed
6 July 2022	(France) Vincent Pajot	Lorient	Annecy	Undisclosed
7 July 2022	(France) Jérémy Gelin	Rennes	Amiens	Free
7 July 2022	(Ivory Coast) Issouf Macalou	Valenciennes	Red Star	Undisclosed
7 July 2022	(Serbia) Nemanja Radonjić	Marseille	(Italy) Torino	Loan
8 July 2022	(France) Mounir Chouiar	Dijon	(Turkey) İstanbul Başakşehir	Undisclosed
8 July 2022	(Argentina) Ángel Di María	Paris Saint-Germain	(Italy) Juventus	Free
8 July 2022	(France) Lamine Diaby-Fadiga	Paris	(Netherlands) FC Eindhoven	Loan
8 July 2022	(Nigeria) Valentine Ozornwafor	(Belgium) Charleroi	Sochaux	Loan
9 July 2022	(France) Alimami Gory	(Belgium) Cercle Brugge	Paris	Undisclosed
9 July 2022	(Austria) Patrick Pentz	Austria Wien	Reims	Undisclosed
10 July 2022	(France) Rémy Cabella	Montpellier	Lille	Free
11 July 2022	(Comoros) Abdel-Hakim Abdallah	Grenoble	Rodez	Undisclosed
11 July 2022	(Mali) Cheick Doucouré	Lens	(England) Crystal Palace	Undisclosed
12 July 2022	(Guinea-Bissau) Steve Ambri	Sochaux	(Moldova) Sheriff Tiraspol	Undisclosed
12 July 2022	(France) Angelo Fulgini	Angers	(Germany) Mainz 05	Undisclosed
12 July 2022	(France) Evann Guessand	Nice	Nantes	Loan
12 July 2022	(France) Gautier Larsonneur	Stade Brest	Valenciennes	Loan
12 July 2022	(Croatia) Dario Marešić	Reims	(Croatia) Istra 1961	Loan
12 July 2022	(France) Jason Pendant	(United States) New York Red Bulls	Quevilly-Rouen	Undisclosed
12 July 2022	(France) Brayann Pereira	Lens	Auxerre	Undisclosed
12 July 2022	(Senegal) Issa Soumaré	(Belgium) Beerschot	Quevilly-Rouen	Loan
12 July 2022	(France) Darell Tokpa	Amiens	Stade Briochin	Loan
13 July 2022	(Guinea) Mohamed Bayo	Clermont Foot	Lille	Undisclosed
13 July 2022	(Senegal) Idrissa Camara	(Turkey) Ümraniyespor	Dijon	Free
13 July 2022	(France) Julien Célestine	Rodez	(Mexico) León	Undisclosed
13 July 2022	(France) Tom Ducrocq	Lens	Basta	Loan
13 July 2022	(France) Lucas Gourna-Douath	Saint-Étienne	(Austria) Red Bull Salzburg	€15m
13 July 2022	(France) Benjamin Lecomte	Monaco	(Spain) Espanyol	Loan
13 July 2022	(Democratic Republic of the Congo) Yann Kitala	Sochaux	Le Havre	Undisclosed
13 July 2022	(Switzerland) Yvon Mvogo	(Germany) RB Leipzig	Lorient	Undisclosed
13 July 2022	(Senegal) Abdallah Sima	(England) Brighton & Hove Albion	Angers	Loan
14 July 2022	(Senegal) Franck Kanouté	(Belgium) Cercle Brugge	Sochaux	Loan
15 July 2022	(Serbia) Komnen Andrić	(Croatia) Dinamo Zagreb	Clermont Foot	Undisclosed
15 July 2022	(Croatia) Domagoj Bradarić	Lille	(Italy) Salernitana	Undisclosed
15 July 2022	(France) Benoît Costil	Bordeaux	Auxerre	Free
15 July 2022	(Switzerland) Breel Embolo	(Germany) Borussia Mönchengladbach	Monaco	€12.5m
15 July 2022	(France) Nassim Innocenti	Lille	Valenciennes	Undisclosed
15 July 2022	(Democratic Republic of the Congo) Chancel Mbemba	(Portugal) Porto	Marseille	Free
15 July 2022	(Senegal) Ousseynou Thioune	Sochaux	Dijon	Free
16 July 2022	(France) Nathan Dekoke	Quevilly-Rouen	Bourg-en-Bresse	Undisclosed
17 July 2022	(France) Hugo Ekitike	Stade de Reims	Paris Saint-Germain	Loan
17 July 2022	(Romania) Rareș Ilie	(Romania) Rapid București	Nice	€5m
18 July 2022	(Denmark) Andreas Bruus	(Denmark) Brøndby	Troyes	Undisclosed
18 July 2022	(France) Andy Diouf	Rennes	(Switzerland) Basel	Loan
18 July 2022	(Benin) Cédric Hountondji	Clermont Foot	Angers	Undisclosed
18 July 2022	(Sweden) Zeidane Inoussa	Caen	(Spain) Real Murcia	Loan
18 July 2022	(Tunisia) Montassar Talbi	(Russia) Rubin Kazan	Lorient	Undisclosed
19 July 2022	(France) Simon Banza	Lens	(Portugal) Braga	€3m
19 July 2022	(France) Hugo Barbet	EA Guingamp	Borgo	Loan
19 July 2022	(Algeria) Ilyes Chetti	(Algeria) ES Tunis	Angers	Undisclosed
19 July 2022	(Senegal) Mamadou Diop	Chambly	Grenoble	Undisclosed
19 July 2022	(France) Julien Faussurier	Brest	Sochaux	Free
19 July 2022	(United States) Nicholas Gioacchini	Caen	(United States) Orlando City SC	Undisclosed
19 July 2022	(Germany) Moritz Jenz	Lorient	(Scotland) Celtic	Loan
19 July 2022	(The Gambia) Saikou Touray	(Israel) Maccabi Haifa	Grenoble	Undisclosed
19 July 2022	(Sweden) Oliver Zandén	(Sweden) Elfsborg	Toulouse	Undisclosed
20 July 2022	(Spain) Rubén Blanco	(Spain) Celta Vigo	Marseille	Loan
20 July 2022	(France) Mathieu Cafaro	(Belgium) Standard Liège	Saint-Étienne	Loan
20 July 2022	(France) Jonathan Clauss	Lens	Marseille	Undisclosed
20 July 2022	(France) Thomas Didillon	(Belgium) Cercle Brugge	Monaco	Loan
20 July 2022	(France) Lucas Larade	Monaco	(Belgium) Cercle Brugge	Undisclosed
20 July 2022	(France) Victor Lobry	Pau	Saint-Étienne	Free
20 July 2022	(Poland) Radosław Majecki	Monaco	(Belgium) Cercle Brugge	Loan
20 July 2022	(France) Gaëtan Paqueiz	Nîmes	Grenoble	Undisclosed
20 July 2022	(Colombia) Luis Suárez	(Spain) Granada	Marseille	Undisclosed
20 July 2022	(France) Louis Torres	Monaco	(Belgium) Cercle Brugge	Undisclosed
21 July 2022	(Spain) Oriol Busquets	Clermont Foot	(Portugal) Arouca	Undisclosed
21 July 2022	(France) Mamadou Camara	Troyes	Quevilly-Rouen	Undisclosed
21 July 2022	(France) Léo Dubois	Lyon	(Turkey) Galatasaray	€3m
21 July 2022	(Belgium) Sami Lahssaini	Metz	(Belgium) RFC Seraing	Loan
21 July 2022	(France) Vincent Manceau	Angers	EA Guingamp	Free
21 July 2022	(France) Sékou Mara	Bordeaux	(England) Southampton	Undisclosed
21 July 2022	(Egypt) Mostafa Mohamed	(Turkey) Galatasaray	Nantes	Loan
21 July 2022	(Ivory Coast) Ismaël Traoré	Angers	Metz	Free
22 July 2022	(France) Yohan Baï	(Bulgaria) CSKA Sofia	Bastia	Undisclosed
22 July 2022	(Turkey) Metehan Güçlü	Rennes	(Netherlands) Emmen	Undisclosed
22 July 2022	(Brazil) Luis Henrique	Marseille	(Brazil) Botafogo	Loan
22 July 2022	(Serbia) Predrag Rajković	Reims	(Spain) Mallorca	€4.5m
22 July 2022	(France) Gaëtan Robail	Lens	(Greece) Atromitos	Undisclosed
23 July 2022	(Sierra Leone) Jocelyn Janneh	(Turkey) Kayserispor	Bastia	Undisclosed
23 July 2022	(France) Pierre Lees-Melou	(England) Norwich City	Brest	€2.3m
23 July 2022	(France) Ronaël Pierre-Gabriel	(Germany) Mainz 05	Strasbourg	Loan
23 July 2022	(Guinea) Salifou Soumah	(Turkey) Yerköyspor	Bastia	Undisclosed
23 July 2022	(Argentina) Nicolás Tagliafico	(Netherlands) Ajax	Lyon	€4.2m
25 July 2022	(France) Gaby Jean	Louhans-Cuiseaux	Annecy	Undisclosed
25 July 2022	(Poland) Mateusz Wieteska	(Poland) Legia Warsaw	Clermont Foot	Undisclosed
26 July 2022	(France) Zakaria Diallo	(India) NorthEast United	Le Havre	Undisclosed
26 July 2022	(Republic of the Congo) Fernand Mayembo	Le Havre	Ajaccio	Undisclosed
26 July 2022	(France) Nordi Mukiele	(Germany) RB Leipzig	Paris Saint-Germain	€10m
26 July 2022	(Martinique) Jonathan Rivierez	Caen	Bourg-en-Bresse	Undisclosed
26 July 2022	(France) Mathys Tel	Rennes	(Germany) Bayern Munich	€28.5m
27 July 2022	(Argentina) Joaquín Blázquez	(Argentina) Talleres	Brest	Loan
27 July 2022	(Sweden) Jack Lahne	Amiens	(Hungary) Újpest	Loan
27 July 2022	(France) Nicolas Mercier	Auxerre	Avranches	Loan
28 July 2022	(Mali) Fodé Doucouré	Reims	Red Star	Undisclosed
28 July 2022	(Scotland) Fraser Hornby	Reims	(Belgium) Oostende	Loan
28 July 2022	(Georgia (country)) Nikoloz Kutateladze	(Russia) Spartak Moscow	Rodez	Undisclosed
29 July 2022	(Cameroon) Enzo Ebosse	Angers	(Italy) Udinese	Undisclosed
29 July 2022	(Japan) Junya Ito	(Belgium) Genk	Reims	Undisclosed
29 July 2022	(Brazil) Luan Peres	Marseille	(Turkey) Fenerbahçe	Undisclosed
29 July 2022	(Belgium) Arthur Theate	(Italy) Bologna	Rennes	Undisclosed
30 July 2022	(Tunisia) Mohamed Ben Fredj	Auxerre	Le Puy	Loan
30 July 2022	(Morocco) Achraf Dari	(Morocco) Wydad	Brest	€2.7m
30 July 2022	(Portugal) Nuno Tavares	(England) Arsenal	Marseille	Loan
1 August 2022	(France) Alexis Beka Beka	(Russia) Lokomotiv Moscow	Nice	€14m
1 August 2022	(Wales) Aaron Ramsey	(Italy) Juventus	Nice	Free
1 August 2022	(Wales) Joe Rodon	(England) Tottenham Hotspur	Rennes	Loan
2 August 2022	(Angola) Jérémie Bela	(England) Birmingham City	Clermont Foot	Free
2 August 2022	(Kosovo) Bersant Celina	Dijon	(Turkey) Kasımpaşa	Loan
2 August 2022	(Guinea) Julian Jeanvier	(England) Brentford	Auxerre	Undisclosed
2 August 2022	(Portugal) Xande Silva	(England) Nottingham Forest	Dijon	Undisclosed
2 August 2022	(Republic of the Congo) Warren Tchimbembé	Metz	EA Guingamp	Loan
2 August 2022	(Guadeloupe) Yohann Thuram-Ulien	Amiens	Quevilly-Rouen	Free
3 August 2022	(England) Folarin Balogun	(England) Arsenal	Reims	Loan
3 August 2022	(Scotland) Charles Boli	Lens	Pau	Undisclosed
3 August 2022	(Cameroon) Alex Guett Guett	Sochaux	(Luxembourg) Progrès Niederkorn	Loan
3 August 2022	(Portugal) Tiago Ribeiro	Monaco	(Spain) Valencia	Loan
3 August 2022	(Ivory Coast) Moïse Sahi	Strasbourg	Annecy	Loan
3 August 2022	(Denmark) Kasper Schmeichel	(England) Leicester City	Nice	Undisclosed
3 August 2022	(Italy) Mattia Viti	(Italy) Empoli	Nice	Undisclosed
3 August 2022	(France) Daouda Weidmann	Paris Saint-Germain	(Italy) Torino	Undisclosed
4 August 2022	(Brazil) Ismaily	(Ukraine) Shakhtar Donetsk	Lille	Free
4 August 2022	(France) Lenny Lacroix	Metz	(Portugal) Benfica	Undisclosed
4 August 2022	(France) Adilson Malanda	Rodez	(United States) Charlotte FC	Undisclosed
4 August 2022	(Cameroon) Marius Noubissi	(Belgium) Beerschot	Valenciennes	Undisclosed
4 August 2022	(France) Lenny Pintor	Lyon	Saint-Étienne	Free
4 August 2022	(Madagascar) Rayan Raveloson	(United States) LA Galaxy	Auxerre	Undisclosed
4 August 2022	(Portugal) Renato Sanches	Lille	Paris Saint-Germain	€10m
4 August 2022	(France) Yaya Soumaré	Lyon	Bourg-en-Bresse	Loan
4 August 2022	(Canada) Iké Ugbo	(Belgium) Genk	Troyes	Undisclosed
4 August 2022	(France) Zaydou Youssouf	Saint-Étienne	(Portugal) Famalicão	Undisclosed
5 August 2022	(Gabon) Denis Bouanga	Saint-Étienne	(United States) Los Angeles	$5m
5 August 2022	(Cape Verde) Nuno da Costa	(England) Nottingham Forest	Auxerre	Undisclosed
5 August 2022	(Ivory Coast) Kouadio-Yves Dabila	Lille	Paris	Undisclosed
5 August 2022	(France) Bafodé Diakité	Toulouse	Lille	Undisclosed
5 August 2022	(France) Jordan Veretout	(Italy) Roma	Marseille	Undisclosed
5 August 2022	(Netherlands) Georginio Wijnaldum	Paris Saint-Germain	(Italy) Roma	Loan
8 August 2022	(Algeria) Hamza Mouali	(Algeria) Paradou	Laval	Loan
9 August 2022	(Ivory Coast) Achille Anani	Grenoble	Red Star	Undisclosed
9 August 2022	(France) Thierno Baldé	Paris Saint-Germain	Troyes	Undisclosed
9 August 2022	(Togo) Kévin Boma	Angers	Rodez	Undisclosed
9 August 2022	(Ghana) Emmanuel Lomotey	Amiens	(Sweden) Malmö	Undisclosed
9 August 2022	(France) Loris Mouyokolo	Lorient	Rodez	Loan
9 August 2022	(Belgium) Amadou Onana	Lille	(England) Everton	£33m
10 August 2022	(Nigeria) Taofeek Ismaheel	Lorient	(Belgium) Beveren	Loan
10 August 2022	(Chile) Alexis Sánchez	(Italy) Inter Milan	Marseille	Free
10 August 2022	(France) Malang Sarr	(England) Chelsea	Monaco	Loan
11 August 2022	(France) Ibrahima Baldé	Lens	Annecy	Loan
11 August 2022	(France) Sofyan Chader	Clermont Foot	(Switzerland) Stade Lausanne Ouchy	Undisclosed
11 August 2022	(France) Gaëtan Courtet	Ajaccio	EA Guingamp	Undisclosed
11 August 2022	(France) Arnaud Kalimuendo	Paris Saint-Germain	Rennes	Undisclosed
12 August 2022	(Brazil) Danilo Barbosa	Nice	(Brazil) Botafogo	Undisclosed
12 August 2022	(Tunisia) Dylan Bronn	Metz	(Italy) Salernitana	Undisclosed
12 August 2022	(Mali) Yaya Fofana	(Mali) Afrique Football Élite	Lens	Undisclosed
12 August 2022	(Burkina Faso) Issa Kaboré	(England) Manchester City	Marseille	Loan
12 August 2022	(Ivory Coast) Koffi Kouao	(Portugal) Vizela	Metz	Undisclosed
12 August 2022	(Spain) Pol Lirola	Marseille	(Spain) Elche	Loan
12 August 2022	(Ghana) Gideon Mensah	(Austria) Red Bull Salzburg	Auxerre	Undisclosed
13 August 2022	(United States) Konrad de la Fuente	Marseille	(Greece) Olympiacos	Loan
13 August 2022	(France) Kalidou Sidibé	Toulouse	Quevilly-Rouen	Loan
14 August 2022	(Mali) Mohamed Camara	(Austria) Red Bull Salzburg	Monaco	Undisclosed
15 August 2022	(South Korea) Park Jung-bin	(South Korea) Seoul	Rodez	Free
16 August 2022	(Netherlands) Benjamin Bouchouari	(Netherlands) Roda	Saint-Étienne	Undisclosed
16 August 2022	(France) Ousmane Camara	Paris	Angers	Undisclosed
16 August 2022	(France) Tidiane Malbec	Bordeaux	Annecy	Undisclosed
16 August 2022	(France) Chrislain Matsima	Monaco	Lorient	Loan
16 August 2022	(Senegal) M'Baye Niang	Bordeaux	Auxerre	Undisclosed
17 August 2022	(France) Nathan Bitumazala	Paris Saint-Germain	(Belgium) KAS Eupen	Undisclosed
17 August 2022	(France) Alois Confais	(Cyprus) Olympiakos Nicosia	Le Havre	Undisclosed
17 August 2022	(Germany) Thilo Kehrer	Paris Saint-Germain	(England) West Ham United	£10.1m
17 August 2022	(France) Marvin Senaya	Strasbourg	Rodez	Loan
17 August 2022	(France) Alan Virginius	Sochaux	Lille	Undisclosed
18 August 2022	(France) Andy Pembélé	Paris	Rodez	Loan
20 August 2022	(France) Téva Gardies	Sète	Paris	Undisclosed
20 August 2022	(Senegal) Sambou Soumano	Lorient	(Belgium) Eupen	Loan
21 August 2022	(France) Junior Dina Ebimbe	Paris Saint-Germain	(Germany) Eintracht Frankfurt	Loan
22 August 2022	(France) Alec Georgen	Auxerre	Concarneau	Loan
23 August 2022	(Guinea-Bissau) Moreto Cassamá	Reims	(Cyprus) Omonia	Undisclosed
23 August 2022	(France) Matthieu Dreyer	Lorient	Saint-Étienne	Undisclosed
23 August 2022	(France) Christopher Jullien	(Scotland) Celtic	Montpellier	€1m
23 August 2022	(Turkey) Cenk Özkacar	Lyon	(Spain) Valencia	Loan
23 August 2022	(Cameroon) Wilitty Younoussa	Dijon	Rodez	Undisclosed
24 August 2022	(Ivory Coast) Eric Bailly	(England) Manchester United	Marseille	Loan
24 August 2022	(Burkina Faso) Hassane Bandé	(Netherlands) Ajax	Amiens	Undisclosed
24 August 2022	(Portugal) Rony Lopes	(Spain) Sevilla	Troyes	Loan
24 August 2022	(Mozambique) Mexer	Bordeaux	(Portugal) Estoril Praia	Undisclosed
24 August 2022	(Netherlands) Kevin Strootman	Marseille	(Italy) Genoa	Loan
24 August 2022	(Tunisia) Yoann Touzghar	Troyes	Ajaccio	Undisclosed
25 August 2022	(Angola) Capita	Lille	(Portugal) Estrela da Amadora	Undisclosed
25 August 2022	(France) Jean Marcelin	Monaco	(Belgium) Cercle Brugge	Loan
25 August 2022	(Mauritania) Pape Ndiaga Yade	Metz	Troyes	Loan
25 August 2022	(Algeria) Islam Slimani	(Portugal) Sporting CP	Brest	Undisclosed
25 August 2022	(Ivory Coast) Nicolas Pépé	(England) Arsenal	Nice	Loan
26 August 2022	(France) Mahdi Camara	Saint-Étienne	Brest	Loan
26 August 2022	(Italy) Denis Franchi	Paris Saint-Germain	(England) Burnley	Undisclosed
26 August 2022	(Poland) Arkadiusz Milik	Marseille	(Italy) Juventus	Loan
26 August 2022	(Finland) Naatan Skyttä	Toulouse	(Norway) Viking	Loan
26 August 2022	(South Korea) Hwang Ui-jo	Bordeaux	(England) Nottingham Forest	Undisclosed
27 August 2022	(Algeria) Yuliwes Bellache	Clermont Foot	Austria Lustenau	Loan
27 August 2022	(France) Moutanabi Bodiang	Paris Saint-Germain	Le Puy	Loan
27 August 2022	(Spain) Ander Herrera	Paris Saint-Germain	(Spain) Athletic Bilbao	Loan
28 August 2022	(Burkina Faso) Nasser Djiga	(Switzerland) Basel	Nîmes	Loan
29 August 2022	(Norway) Patrick Berg	Lens	(Norway) Bodø/Glimt	Undisclosed
29 August 2022	(Belgium) Maximiliano Caufriez	(Russia) Spartak Moscow	Clermont Foot	Loan
29 August 2022	(Austria) Flavius Daniliuc	Nice	(Italy) Salernitana	Undisclosed
29 August 2022	(France) Sofiane Diop	Monaco	Nice	Undisclosed
29 August 2022	(France) Naël Jaby	Clermont Foot	Moulins Yzeure	Loan
29 August 2022	(Zimbabwe) Tino Kadewere	Lyon	(Spain) Mallorca	Loan
29 August 2022	(Netherlands) Anthony Musaba	Monaco	Metz	Loan
29 August 2022	(France) David Oberhauser	Metz	Boulogne	Undisclosed
29 August 2022	(Brazil) Lucas Paquetá	Lyon	(England) West Ham United	£50m
30 August 2022	(Tunisia) Aymen Abdennour	(Qatar) Umm Salal	Rodez	Free
30 August 2022	(Sweden) Amar Abdirahman Ahmed	(Sweden) AIK	Troyes	€5m
30 August 2022	(Ivory Coast) Axel Bamba	Paris	(Spain) Sporting Gijón	Undisclosed
30 August 2022	(Ivory Coast) Dieudonné Gaucho Debohi	(Ivory Coast) FC Abolo	Caen	Undisclosed
30 August 2022	(Mali) Youssouf Koné	Lyon	Ajaccio	Loan
30 August 2022	(Switzerland) Dereck Kutesa	Reims	(Switzerland) Servette	Undisclosed
30 August 2022	(France) Jordan Lefort	(Switzerland) Young Boys	Paris	Undisclosed
30 August 2022	(France) Thomas Monconduit	Lorient	Saint-Étienne	Undisclosed
30 August 2022	(France) Kenny Nagera	Paris Saint-Germain	Lorient	Loan
30 August 2022	(France) Léo Pétrot	Lorient	Saint-Étienne	Undisclosed
30 August 2022	(Spain) Fabián Ruiz	(Italy) Napoli	Paris Saint-Germain	Undisclosed
30 August 2022	(Netherlands) Calvin Stengs	Nice	(Belgium) Royal Antwerp	Loan
30 August 2022	(France) Loum Tchaouna	Rennes	Dijon	Loan
30 August 2022	(Italy) Franco Tongya	Marseille	(Denmark) Odense	Undisclosed
30 August 2022	(France) Éric Vandenabeele	Valenciennes	Rodez	Undisclosed
30 August 2022	(Senegal) Ibrahima Wadji	(Azerbaijan) Qarabağ	Saint-Étienne	Undisclosed
31 August 2022	(France) Abdoullah Ba	Le Havre	(England) Sunderland	Undisclosed
31 August 2022	(Senegal) Aliou Badji	Amiens	Bordeaux	Loan
31 August 2022	(Tunisia) Syam Ben Youssef	(Bulgaria) Beroe	Quevilly-Rouen	Free
31 August 2022	(England) Joe Bryan	(England) Fulham	Nice	Loan
31 August 2022	(France) Mathieu Cachbach	Metz	(Belgium) RFC Seraing	Undisclosed
31 August 2022	(France) Alexis Claude-Maurice	Nice	Lens	Loan
31 August 2022	(Senegal) Papiss Cissé	(Turkey) Çaykur Rizespor	Amiens	Free
31 August 2022	(Greece) Anastasios Donis	Reims	(Cyprus) APOEL	Loan
31 August 2022	(France) Andrew Jung	(Belgium) KV Oostende	Quevilly-Rouen	Loan
31 August 2022	(France) Saël Kumbedi	Le Havre	Lyon	Undisclosed
31 August 2022	(France) Armand Laurienté	Lorient	(Italy) Sassuolo	Undisclosed
31 August 2022	(France) Lenny Manisa	Paris Saint-Germain	(Italy) Parma	Undisclosed
31 August 2022	(France) Hiang'a Mbock	Brest	Caen	Loan
31 August 2022	(France) Edouard Michut	Paris Saint-Germain	(England) Sunderland	Loan
31 August 2022	(France) William Mikelbrencis	Metz	(Germany) Hamburger SV	Undisclosed
31 August 2022	(Senegal) Moustapha Name	Paris	(Cyprus) Pafos	Undisclosed
31 August 2022	(Cameroon) Yvan Neyou	Saint-Étienne	(Spain) Leganés	Loan
31 August 2022	(France) Rémi Oudin	Bordeaux	(Italy) Lecce	Loan
31 August 2022	(France) Pablo Pagis	Lorient	Nîmes	Loan
31 August 2022	(Croatia) Ante Palaversa	(England) Manchester City	Troyes	Undisclosed
31 August 2022	(Argentina) Leandro Paredes	Paris Saint-Germain	(Italy) Juventus	Loan
31 August 2022	(France) Tom Rapnouil	Toulouse	(Bulgaria) Botev Vratsa	Loan
31 August 2022	(France) Maxence Rivera	Saint-Étienne	Le Puy	Loan
31 August 2022	(France) Kléri Serber	Toulouse	(Bulgaria) Botev Vratsa	Loan
1 September 2022	(France) Lucien Agoumé	(Italy) Inter Milan	Troyes	Loan
1 September 2022	(Comoros) Anfane Ahamada	Paris Saint-Germain	Martigues	Loan
1 September 2022	(France) Ibrahim Amadou	Metz	Angers	Free
1 September 2022	(France) Jordan Amavi	Marseille	(Spain) Getafe	Loan
1 September 2022	(Ghana) Eric Ayiah	Monaco	(Portugal) Gil Vicente	Undisclosed
1 September 2022	(Mauritania) Pape Ibnou Ba	Le Havre	Pau	Loan
1 September 2022	(France) Loïc Badé	Rennes	(England) Nottingham Forest	Loan
1 September 2022	(France) Yoann Barbet	(England) Queens Park Ranges	Bordeaux	Free
1 September 2022	(Denmark) Mads Bech Sørensen	(England) Brentford	Nice	Loan
1 September 2022	(France) Jason Berthomier	Clermont Foot	Valenciennes	Free
1 September 2022	(Cameroon) Jean-Claude Billong	Clermont Foot	(Romania) CFR Cluj	Undisclosed
1 September 2022	(Serbia) Veljko Birmančević	(Sweden) Malmö	Toulouse	Undisclosed
1 September 2022	(Turkey) Umut Bozok	Lorient	(Turkey) Trabzonspor	Undisclosed
1 September 2022	(Angola) Jonathan Buatu	(Belgium) Sint-Truiden	Valenciennes	Free
1 September 2022	(Croatia) Duje Ćaleta-Car	Marseille	(England) Southampton	Undisclosed
1 September 2022	(France) Mamadou Camara	Lens	Bastia	Loan
1 September 2022	(Senegal) Amadou Ciss	Amiens	(Cyprus) AEL Limassol	Undisclosed
1 September 2022	(France) Yadaly Diaby	Clermont Foot	Austria Lustenau	Loan
1 September 2022	(France) Check Oumar Diakité	Paris	Le Havre	Loan
1 September 2022	(Senegal) Abdou Diallo	Paris Saint-Germain	(Germany) RB Leipzig	Loan
1 September 2022	(Senegal) Mamadou Diarra	(Turkey) Giresunspor	Grenoble	Undisclosed
1 September 2022	(Denmark) Kasper Dolberg	Nice	(Spain) Sevilla	Loan
1 September 2022	(France) Issiar Dramé	(Ukraine) Lviv	Bastia	Free
1 September 2022	(Germany) Julian Draxler	Paris Saint-Germain	(Portugal) Benfica	Loan
1 September 2022	(Belgium) Wout Faes	Reims	(England) Leicester City	Undisclosed
1 September 2022	(Cameroon) Ignatius Ganago	Lens	Nantes	€3.5m
1 September 2022	(Portugal) André Gomes	(England) Everton	Lille	Loan
1 September 2022	(France) Amine Gouiri	Nice	Rennes	Undisclosed
1 September 2022	(Senegal) Idrissa Gueye	Paris Saint-Germain	(England) Everton	Undisclosed
1 September 2022	(Morocco) Amine Harit	(Germany) Schalke 04	Marseille	Loan
1 September 2022	(Norway) Noah Holm	(Norway) Rosenborg	Reims	Loan
1 September 2022	(France) Garissone Innocent	Paris Saint-Germain	(Belgium) KAS Eupen	Undisclosed
1 September 2022	(Senegal) Bingourou Kamara	Strasbourg	Montpellier	Undisclosed
1 September 2022	(Algeria) Ilan Kebbal	Reims	Paris	Loan
1 September 2022	(Netherlands) Terence Kongolo	(England) Fulham	Le Havre	Loan
1 September 2022	(Ukraine) Mykola Kukharevych	Troyes	(Scotland) Hibernian	Loan
1 September 2022	(France) Layvin Kurzawa	Paris Saint-Germain	(England) Fulham	Loan
1 September 2022	(France) Gaëtan Laborde	Rennes	Nice	Undisclosed
1 September 2022	(Poland) Mateusz Lis	(England) Southampton	Troyes	Loan
1 September 2022	(Algeria) Abdeljalil Medioub	Bordeaux	(Cyprus) Aris Limassol	Undisclosed
1 September 2022	(France) Clément Michelin	(Greece) AEK Athens	Bordeaux	Loan
1 September 2022	(Colombia) Marlos Moreno	(England) Manchester City	Troyes	Undisclosed
1 September 2022	(France) Paul Nardi	Lorient	(Belgium) Gent	Undisclosed
1 September 2022	(France) Landry Nomel	Concarneau	Valenciennes	Undisclosed
1 September 2022	(Democratic Republic of the Congo) Vital N'Simba	Clermont Foot	Bordeaux	Free
1 September 2022	(Cameroon) Jean Onana	Bordeaux	Lens	Undisclosed
1 September 2022	(Algeria) Adam Ounas	(Italy) Napoli	Lille	Undisclosed
1 September 2022	(France) Amir Richardson	Le Havre	Reims	Undisclosed
1 September 2022	(France) Aurélien Scheidler	Dijon	(Italy) Bari	Undisclosed
1 September 2022	(Spain) Carlos Soler	(Spain) Valencia	Paris Saint-Germain	Undisclosed
1 September 2022	(France) Jules Sylvestre-Brac	Grenoble	(Switzerland) Stade Nyonnais	Loan
1 September 2022	(France) Ervin Taha	EA Guingamp	Nancy	Undisclosed
1 September 2022	(Mali) El Bilal Touré	Reims	(Spain) Almería	Undisclosed
1 September 2022	(France) Tidjiany Toure	Paris Saint-Germain	(Netherlands) Feyenoord	Undisclosed
1 September 2022	(Mali) Boubacar Traoré	Metz	(England) Wolverhampton Wanderers	Loan
1 September 2022	(Greece) Theocharis Tsingaras	(Greece) PAOK	Toulouse	Loan
1 September 2022	(France) Yan Valery	(England) Southampton	Angers	Undisclosed
1 September 2022	(Cameroon) Christopher Wooh	Lens	Rennes	Undisclosed
2 September 2022	(France) Adil Aouchiche	Saint-Étienne	Lorient	Undisclosed
2 September 2022	(Georgia (country)) Zuriko Davitashvili	(Georgia (country)) Dinamo Batumi	Bordeaux	Loan
2 September 2022	(France) Siriné Doucouré	Châteauroux	Lorient	Undisclosed
2 September 2022	(Ivory Coast) Fred Gnalega	Clermont Foot	Chamalières	Loan
2 September 2022	(Italy) Vito Mannone	Monaco	Lorient	Free
4 September 2022	(England) Ross Barkley	(England) Chelsea	Nice	Free
5 September 2022	(France) Yoann Cathline	EA Guigamp	Lorient	Undisclosed
5 September 2022	(Turkey) Yusuf Yazıcı	Lille	(Turkey) Trabzonspor	Loan
5 September 2022	(Algeria) Mehdi Zerkane	Bordeaux	(Greece) OFI Crete	Loan
6 September 2022	(France) Teddy Alloh	Paris Saint-Germain	(Belgium) KAS Eupen	Undisclosed
6 September 2022	(Mauritania) Djeidi Gassama	Paris Saint-Germain	(Belgium) KAS Eupen	Loan
6 September 2022	(Cape Verde) Vagner Gonçalves	Metz	(Belgium) RFC Seraing	Loan
7 September 2022	(Kosovo) Valon Berisha	Reims	(Australia) Melbourne City	Loan
7 September 2022	(France) Malcolm Viltard	Sochaux	Châteauroux	Loan
8 September 2022	(Argentina) Mauro Icardi	Paris Saint-Germain	(Turkey) Galatasaray	Loan
12 September 2022	(France) Théo Le Normand	EA Guingamp	Avranches	Loan
