= 2022–23 Rodez AF season =

Rodez AF
2022–23 season
- President: Pierre-Olivier Murat
- Head coach: Laurent Peyrelade (until 8 November); Didier Santini (from 28 November)
- Stadium: Stade Paul-Lignon
- Ligue 2: 14th
- Coupe de France: Quarter-finals
- Top goalscorer: League: Clément Depres (7); All: Clément Depres (7)
Home colours	Away colours	Third colours

The 2022–23 season was the 94th in the history of Rodez AF and their fourth consecutive season in the second division. The club participated in Ligue 2 and the Coupe de France.

== Players ==
As of 1 February 2023.

Note: Flags indicate national team as defined under FIFA eligibility rules; some limited exceptions apply. Players may hold more than one non-FIFA nationality.

No.	Pos.	Nation	Player
1	GK	FRA	Sébastien Cibois
2	DF	FRA	Éric Vandenabeele
4	DF	TUN	Aymen Abdennour
5	DF	TOG	Kévin Boma
6	MF	FRA	Rémy Boissier
8	MF	FRA	Lorenzo Rajot
9	FW	KOR	Park Jung-bin
10	MF	FRA	Martin Adeline (on loan from Reims)
11	FW	GBS	Joseph Mendes
12	FW	FRA	Kilian Corredor
13	DF	GEO	Amiran Sanaia
14	MF	FRA	Bradley Danger
15	DF	FRA	Serge-Philippe Raux-Yao
16	GK	COD	Lionel Mpasi

No.	Pos.	Nation	Player
18	MF	FRA	Antoine Valério
19	DF	FRA	Lucas Buadés
20	DF	FRA	Marvin Senaya (on loan from Strasbourg)
21	DF	FRA	Joris Chougrani
22	DF	FRA	Loris Mouyokolo (on loan from Lorient)
23	FW	GEO	Nikoloz Kutateladze
24	FW	FRA	Andy Pembélé (on loan from Paris FC)
25	FW	FRA	Clément Depres
26	MF	CMR	Wilitty Younoussa
28	DF	COM	Akim Abdallah
29	DF	FRA	Louis Torres (on loan from Cercle Brugge)
30	GK	FRA	Thomas Secchi
35	FW	SEN	Sambou Soumano (on loan from Lorient)

=== Out on loan ===
Note: Flags indicate national team as defined under FIFA eligibility rules; some limited exceptions apply. Players may hold more than one non-FIFA nationality.

No. / Pos. / Nation / Player; — / DF / FRA / Grégory Coelho (at Borgo until 30 June 2023)	No. / Pos. / Nation / Player; — / FW / FRA / Hatim Far (at Paris 13 Atletico until 30 June 2023)

== Pre-season and friendlies ==
Win Draw Loss

6 July 2022 Friendly	Bordeaux (France)	2–1	(France) Rodez	Agen
18:00 CEST (UTC+2)	Delaurier-Chaubet 4'; Mwanga 45'		David 53'	Stadium: Stade Pierre-Fernandez

9 July 2022 Friendly	Montpellier (France)	0–1	(France) Rodez	Montpellier
19:00 CEST (UTC+2)			Corredor 3'	Stadium: Stade Bernard Gasset Terrain n°2

14 July 2022 Friendly	Rodez (France)	0–2	(France) Bastia	Onet-le-Château
18:30 CEST (UTC+2)			Alfarela 42'; Magri 61'	Stadium: Stade d'honneur

16 July 2022 Friendly	Rodez (France)	0–1	(France) Lens	Rodez
11:00 CEST (UTC+2)			Banza 30'	Stadium: Stade Paul Lignon
Note: Match was played in two 30-minute halves.

20 July 2022 Friendly	Bourg-en-Bresse (France)	2–1	(France) Rodez	Vichy
18:00 CEST (UTC+2)	Dembélé 13'; Najim 24'		David 41'

23 July 2022 Friendly	Clermont (France)	2–0	(France) Rodez	Clermont-Ferrand
18:00 CEST (UTC+2)	Kyei 44'; Khaoui 51'			Stadium: Stade Philippe Marcombes

10 December 2022 Friendly	Nîmes (France)	0–2	(France) Rodez	Nîmes
15:00 CET (UTC+1)			Raux-Yao 16'; Boissier 83'	Stadium: Stade des Costières

16 December 2022 Friendly	Montpellier (France)	5–0	(France) Rodez	Montpellier
16:00 CET (UTC+1)	Nordin 10'; Savanier 23'; Mavididi 34'; Germain 67'; Souquet 73'			Stadium: Stade Bernard Gasset Terrain n°2

== Competitions ==
=== Overall record ===
Competition	First match	Last match	Starting round	Final position	Record							
Competition	First match	Last match	Starting round	Final position	Pld	W	D	L	GF	GA	GD	Win %
Ligue 2	30 July 2022	2 June 2023	Matchday 1	14th	38	11	13	14	39	44	−5	28.95
Coupe de France	29 October 2022	1 March 2023	Seventh round	Quarter-finals	6	2	3	1	7	10	−3	33.33
Total					44	13	16	15	46	54	−8	29.55

Source: Soccerway

=== Ligue 2 ===
==== League table ====
Pos	Team	Pld	W	D	L	GF	GA	GD	Pts
12	Amiens	38	13	8	17	40	52	−12	47
13	Pau	38	12	11	15	40	52	−12	47
14	Rodez	38	11	13	14	39	44	−5	46
15	Laval	38	14	4	20	44	56	−12	46
16	Valenciennes	38	10	15	13	42	49	−7	45

Source: Ligue 2
Rules for classification: 1) Points; 2) Goal difference; 3) Number of goals scored; 4) Head-to-head goal difference; 5) Fair play points

==== Results summary ====
Overall								Home						Away					
Pld	W	D	L	GF	GA	GD	Pts	W	D	L	GF	GA	GD	W	D	L	GF	GA	GD
38	11	13	14	39	44	−5	46	4	7	8	18	27	−9	7	6	6	21	17	+4

Source: Ligue 2

==== Results by round ====
Round	1	2	3	4	5	6	7	8	9	10	11	12	13	14	15	16	17	18	19	20	21	22
Ground	A	H	A	H	A	H	A	H	A	H	A	H	A	H	A	A	H	H	A	H	A	H
Result	D	L	L	D	W	L	D	D	W	L	D	D	L	L	W	L	W	D	L	L	D	L
Position	11	17	18	17	17	18	18	20	16	14	15	17	17	18	18	18	17	16	17	17	18	19

Source: Ligue 2
A = Away; H = Home; W = Win; D = Draw; L = Loss

==== Matches ====
The league fixtures were announced on 17 June 2022.

30 July 2022 1	Quevilly-Rouen	0–0	Rodez	Le Petit-Quevilly
19:00 CEST (UTC+2)		Report		Stadium: Stade Robert Diochon; Attendance: 2,571; Referee: Antoine Valnet

6 August 2022 2	Rodez	0–3	Bordeaux	Rodez
19:00 CEST (UTC+2)		Report	Ihnatenko 4'; Bakwa 14'; De Lima 90+4'	Stadium: Stade Paul-Lignon; Attendance: 1,565; Referee: Ruddy Buquet

13 August 2022 3	Nîmes	1–0	Rodez	Nîmes
19:00 CEST (UTC+2)	Ómarsson 63'	Report		Stadium: Stade des Costières; Attendance: 2,615; Referee: Aurélien Petit

20 August 2022 4	Rodez	2–2	Annecy	Rodez
19:00 CEST (UTC+2)	Danger 32' (pen.); Depres 90'	Report	Sahi 3' (pen.), 33'	Stadium: Stade Paul-Lignon; Attendance: 1,339; Referee: Pierre Legat

27 August 2022 5	Bastia	0–2	Rodez	Furiani
19:00 CEST (UTC+2)		Report	Depres 52'; Far 71'	Stadium: Stade Armand Cesari; Attendance: 10,000; Referee: Bastien Dechepy

30 August 2022 6	Rodez	1–4	Metz	Rodez
20:45 CEST (UTC+2)	Depres 69'	Report	Mikautadze 21', 36'; Udol 44'; Maziz 75'	Stadium: Stade Paul-Lignon; Attendance: 1,626; Referee: Romain Lissorgue

10 September 2022 8	Rodez	1–1	Valenciennes	Rodez
19:00 CEST (UTC+2)	Senaya (yellow card) 49'; Corredor 52'; Boissier (yellow card) 61' (yellow-red card) 70'	Report	Debuchy (yellow card) 42'; Noubissi 73'; Picouleau (yellow card) 90+4'	Stadium: Stade Paul-Lignon; Attendance: 1,275; Referee: Mikael Lesage

17 September 2022 9	Paris FC	1–2	Rodez	Paris
15:00 CEST (UTC+2)	Guilavogui 24' (pen.); Le Cardinal (yellow card) 77'; Dabila (yellow card) 80'	Report	Depres (yellow card) 14'; Vandenabeele 61'; Rajot (yellow card) 68'; Danger 81' (pen.)	Stadium: Stade Sébastien Charléty; Attendance: 2,467; Referee: Antoine Valnet

1 October 2022 10	Rodez	0–1	Amiens	Rodez
19:00 CEST (UTC+2)	Abdallah (yellow card) 58'		Cissé 29'; Opoku (yellow card) 34'; Fofana (yellow card) 37'	Stadium: Stade Paul-Lignon; Attendance: 1,187; Referee: Faouzi Benchabane

4 October 2022 7	Guingamp	0–0	Rodez	Guingamp
20:45 CEST (UTC+2)	Gaudin (yellow card) 68'	Report	Danger (yellow card) 19'; Chougrani (yellow card) 64'; Pembélé (yellow card) 90+2'	Stadium: Stade de Roudourou; Attendance: 7,737; Referee: Olivier Thual
Note: Match postponed from 2 Sept. due to travel difficulties experienced by the Rodez squad.

8 October 2022 11	Pau	2–2	Rodez	Pau
19:00 CEST (UTC+2)	Sow (yellow card) 14'; Bassouamina (yellow card) 33'; Bâ 45'; Hải 86'	Report	Danger (yellow card) 12'; Pembélé 50'; Ouammou 67'; Boissier (yellow card) 87'; Senaya (yellow card) 87'	Stadium: Nouste Camp; Attendance: 2,744; Referee: William Toulliou

15 October 2022 12	Rodez	1–1	Le Havre	Rodez
19:00 CEST (UTC+2)	Ouammou (yellow card) 22'; Boissier (yellow card) 54'; Depres (yellow card) 64'; Mendes 74'; Danger (yellow card) 76'	Report	Kechta (yellow card) 36'; Danger 45' (o.g.); Thiaré (yellow card) 66'; Opéri (yellow card) 83'; Sangante (yellow card) 90+5'	Stadium: Stade Paul-Lignon; Attendance: 1,538; Referee: Pierre Legat

22 October 2022 13	Caen	2–0	Rodez	Caen
19:00 CEST (UTC+2)	Daubin (yellow card) 49'; Abdi (yellow card) 57'; Mendy 68'; Essende 71'; Ntim (yellow card) 86'	Report	Abdallah (red card) 44'; Chougrani (yellow card) 86'	Stadium: Stade Michel d'Ornano; Attendance: 11,197; Referee: Guillaume Paradis

5 November 2022 14	Rodez	0–1	Grenoble	Rodez
19:00 CEST (UTC+2)		Report	Diarra 61', (yellow card) 84'; Tell (yellow card) 81'; Paquiez (yellow card) 87'	Stadium: Stade Paul-Lignon; Attendance: 1,515; Referee: Romain Lissorgue

12 November 2022 15	Saint-Étienne	0–2	Rodez	Saint-Étienne
15:00 CET (UTC+1)	Nadé (yellow card) 24'; Krasso (yellow card) 38'; Cafaro (yellow card) 57'; Giraudon (yellow card) 68', (red card) 68'	Report	Danger (yellow card) 20'; Chougrani (yellow card) 26'; Depres (yellow card) 44'; Senaya 54'; Namri 60' (o.g.)	Stadium: Stade Geoffroy-Guichard; Attendance: 19,743; Referee: Pierre Legat

26 December 2022 16	Sochaux	1–0	Rodez	Montbéliard
21:00 CET (UTC+1)	Agouzoul (yellow card) 49'; Kalulu 73'	Report	Senaya (yellow card) 59'	Stadium: Stade Auguste Bonal; Attendance: 11,719; Referee: Mathieu Vernice

30 December 2022 17	Rodez	2–1	Dijon	Rodez
21:00 CET (UTC+1)	Depres 9'; Senaya 16'; Boissier (yellow card) 58'	Report	Congré (yellow card) 35'; Silva 68'; Le Bihan (yellow card) 90+4'	Stadium: Stade Paul-Lignon; Attendance: 3,009; Referee: Pierre Legat

10 January 2022 18	Rodez	1–1	Niort	Rodez
20:45 CET (UTC+1)	Raux-Yao (yellow card) 21'; Danger (yellow card) 25'; Rajot 63'	Report	Boutobba 59'; Zemzemi (yellow card) 90+5'	Stadium: Stade Paul-Lignon; Attendance: 2,728; Referee: Faouzi Benchabane

13 January 2023 19	Laval	3–1	Rodez	Laval
19:00 CET (UTC+1)	Durbant 16'; Gonçalves (red card) 39'; Bobichon 49'; Seidou (yellow card) 62'; Baudry 78'	Report	Depres (red card) 34'; Rajot (yellow card) 45'; Pembélé (yellow card) 50'; Mouyokolo (yellow card) 55'; Mendes 75'	Stadium: Stade Francis Le Basser; Attendance: 5,252; Referee: Rémi Landry

28 January 2022 20	Rodez	0–1	Guingamp	Rodez
19:00 CET (UTC+1)	Vandenabeele (yellow card) 45+3'; Depres (yellow card) 45+3'; Senaya (yellow card) 63'	Report	Guillaume 58', (yellow card) 72'	Stadium: Stade Paul-Lignon; Attendance: 2,233; Referee: Guillaume Paradis

31 January 2023 21	Metz	1–1	Rodez	Metz
20:45 CEST (UTC+2)	Jean Jacques (yellow card) 22'; Joseph (yellow card) 40'; Kouao (yellow card) 54'; Mikautadze 63', (yellow card) 74'	Report	Vandenabeele (yellow card) 18'; Mouyokolo (yellow card) 28'; Boissier 79'; Senaya (yellow card) 82'; M'Pasi (red card) 90'	Stadium: Stade Saint-Symphorien; Attendance: 11,442; Referee: Pierre Legat

3 February 2022 22	Rodez	1–2	Sochaux	Rodez
20:45 CET (UTC+1)	Depres 41'; Boma (yellow card) 78'	Report	Doumbia 11'; Sissoko (yellow card) 17', (goal) 79' (pen.)	Stadium: Stade Paul-Lignon; Attendance: 2,300; Referee: William Toulliou

11 February 2022 23	Rodez	1–1	Nîmes	Rodez
19:00 CET (UTC+1)	Depres 7' (pen.); Raux-Yao (yellow card) 33'	Report	Saïd 50'; Benezet (yellow card) 78'; Ambri (yellow card) 90+4'	Stadium: Stade Paul-Lignon; Attendance: 2,605; Referee: Romain Lissorgue

18 February 2023 24	Valenciennes	0–0	Rodez	Valenciennes
19:00 CET (UTC+2)		Report	Chougrani (yellow card) 4'; Boissier (yellow card) 81'	Stadium: Stade Nungesser; Attendance: 6,646; Referee: Abdelatif Kherradji

25 February 2022 25	Rodez	0–2	Bastia	Rodez
19:00 CET (UTC+1)	Adeline (yellow card) 42'	Report	Kaïboué 25'; Palun (yellow card) 45'; Vincent 60'; Van Den Kerkhof (yellow card) 79'; Djoco (yellow card) 85'	Stadium: Stade Paul-Lignon; Attendance: 2,613; Referee: Rémi Landry

4 March 2023 26	Niort	2–3	Rodez	Niort
19:00 CET (UTC+1)	Olaitan 11'; Flemmings 79'	Report	Danger 24' (pen.); Passi 31' (o.g.); Abdallah (yellow card) 45+2'; Buadés 87'; Boissier (yellow card) 88'; Valério (yellow card) 88'	Stadium: Stade René Gaillard; Attendance: 2,349; Referee: Mikael Lesage

11 March 2023 27	Rodez	3–2	Caen	Rodez
19:00 CET (UTC+1)	Soumano 15'; Raux-Yao 27'; Corredor 54'; Pembélé (yellow card) 84'; Abdallah (yellow card) 89'; Mendes (yellow card) 90'	Report	Court 38'; Diani (yellow card) 90'; Abdi 90+2'	Stadium: Stade Paul-Lignon; Attendance: 2,012; Referee: Faouzi Benchabane

18 March 2023 28	Amiens	1–3	Rodez	Amiens
19:00 CET (UTC+1)	Antiste 19'; Gene (yellow card) 55'	Report	Valério (yellow card) 10'; Rajot 13'; Soumano 62'; Corredor 76'	Stadium: Stade de la Licorne; Attendance: 6,010; Referee: William Toulliou

1 April 2023 29	Rodez	1–0	Quevilly-Rouen	Rodez
19:00 CEST (UTC+2)	M'Pasi (yellow card) 21'; Depres (yellow card) 59'; Boissier 62', (yellow card) 70'	Report	Sidibé (yellow card) 55'	Stadium: Stade Paul-Lignon; Attendance: 2,577; Referee: Aurélien Petit

8 April 2023 30	Dijon	1–0	Rodez	Dijon
19:00 CEST (UTC+2)	Ahlinvi (yellow card) 71'; Le Bihan 75'	Report		Stadium: Stade Gaston-Gérard; Attendance: 6,859; Referee: Abdelatif Kherradji

15 April 2023 31	Rodez	1–0	Laval	Rodez
19:00 CEST (UTC+2)	Valério (yellow card) 25'; Corredor 36'; Depres (yellow card) 90'	Report	Bobichon (yellow card) 19'; A. Gonçalves (yellow card) 38'; Tapoko (yellow card) 90+4'	Stadium: Stade Paul-Lignon; Attendance: 2,701; Referee: Antoine Valnet

22 April 2023 32	Annecy	0–3	Rodez	Annecy
19:00 CEST (UTC+2)	Mendy (yellow card) 67'	Report	Corredor 53'; Senaya 59'; Depres 90+3'	Stadium: Parc des Sports; Attendance: 6,818; Referee: Benjamin Lepaysant

29 April 2023 33	Rodez	1–1	Saint-Etienne	Rodez
19:00 CEST (UTC+2)	Danger 48' (pen.); Younoussa (yellow card) 81'	Report	Nkounkou (yellow card) 44'; Fomba (yellow card) 54'; Bamba 83'	Stadium: Stade Paul-Lignon; Attendance: 3,263; Referee: Guillaume Paradis

8 May 2023 34	Le Havre	1–0	Rodez	Le Havre
19:00 CEST (UTC+2)	Valério 88' (o.g.)	Report	Abdallah (yellow card) 40'	Stadium: Stade Océane; Attendance: 14,688; Referee: Gaël Angoula

13 May 2023 35	Rodez	0–0	Paris FC	Rodez
19:00 CEST (UTC+2)	Depres (yellow card) 66'	Report	Guilavogui (yellow card) 39'	Stadium: Stade Paul-Lignon; Attendance: 2,900; Referee: Aurélien Petit

19 May 2023 36	Grenoble	1–1	Rodez	Grenoble
19:00 CET (UTC+1)	Isola 34'; Mendy (yellow card) 74'	Report	Corredor 17'	Stadium: Stade des Alpes; Attendance: 3,880; Referee: Alexandre Perreau Niel

26 May 2023 37	Rodez	2–3	Pau	Rodez
20:45 CEST (UTC+2)	M'Pasi (yellow card) 10'; Boissier 19'; Younoussa 74'; Cibois (yellow card) 88'	Report	Begraoui 11' (pen.), 41'; George 26'; Abzi (yellow card) 29'; Boli (yellow card) 90+3'; Batisse (red card) 90+6'	Stadium: Stade Paul-Lignon; Attendance: 3,049; Referee: Faouzi Benchabane

2 June 2023 38	Bordeaux	0–1	Rodez	Bordeaux
13:45 CEST (UTC+2)		Report	Buadés 22'	Stadium: Matmut Atlantique; Attendance: 41,591; Referee: Nicolas Rainville
Note: Match suspended following a pitch invasion after the 22nd minute goal and the win was awarded to Rodez.

=== Coupe de France ===
29 October 2022 7th Rnd	Saint-Étienne	0–0 (3–4 p)	Rodez	Saint-Étienne
15:00 CEST	Pintor (yellow card) 50'; Monconduit (yellow card) 72'	Report	Mouyokolo (yellow card) 66'	Stadium: Stade Geoffroy-Guichard; Attendance: 17,085; Referee: Faouzi Benchabane

19 November 2022 8th Rnd	FC Roche-Saint-Genest	0–1	Rodez	Feurs
18:00 CET		Report	Rajot 38'	Stadium: Stade Maurice Rousson; Attendance: 1,018; Referee: Anthony Ustaritz

7 January 2023 Rnd of 64	Monaco	2–2 (4–5 p)	Rodez	Monaco
18:00 CET	Akliouche 23'; Ben Yedder 37'	Report	Mendes 42'; Abdennour 80'	Stadium: Stade Louis II; Referee: Hakim Ben El Hadj
	Penalties
	Ben Yedder (penalty scored); Disasi (penalty scored); Seghir (penalty scored); Caio Henrique (penalty scored); Golovin (penalty missed); Magassa (penalty missed)		(penalty scored) Abdennour; (penalty scored) Danger; (penalty missed) Corredor; (penalty scored) Senaya; (penalty scored) Depres; (penalty scored) Pembélé

21 January 2023 Rnd of 32	RC Grasse	0–0 (4–5 p)	Rodez	Grasse
18:00 CET		Report		Stadium: Stade de la Paoute; Attendance: 2,000; Referee: Jeremy Stinat
	Penalties
	Gazzaoui (penalty scored); Guèye (penalty missed); Ako (penalty scored); Muratori (penalty scored); Souda (penalty missed); Châtelain (penalty scored); Medjian (penalty missed)		(penalty scored) Raux-Yao; (penalty missed) Vandenabeele; (penalty missed) Abdallah; (penalty scored) Danger; (penalty scored) Pembélé; (penalty scored) Younoussa; (penalty scored) Boissier

8 February 2023 Rnd of 16	Auxerre	2–3	Rodez	Auxerre
18:15 CET	Niang 45+2'; Sakhi (yellow card) 65'; Bain (yellow card) 75'; Jubal 90+1'	Report	Mendes 3'; Valério (yellow card) 61'; Corredor 68'; Park Jung-bin 76' (pen.); Adeline (yellow card) 90+5'	Stadium: Stade de l'Abbé-Deschamps; Attendance: 6,000; Referee: Stéphanie Frappart

1 March 2023 Quarter-finals	Toulouse	6–1	Rodez	Toulouse
18:45 CET (UTC+1)	Aboukhlal 5'; Van den Boomen 7'; Dallinga 10', 51' (pen.); Chaïbi 21'; Suazo 38'	Report	Raux-Yao (yellow card) 20'; Younoussa 69'	Stadium: Stadium de Toulouse; Attendance: 30,480; Referee: Jérémie Pignard
