= Stephen Hicks =

Canadian-American philosopher (born 1960)

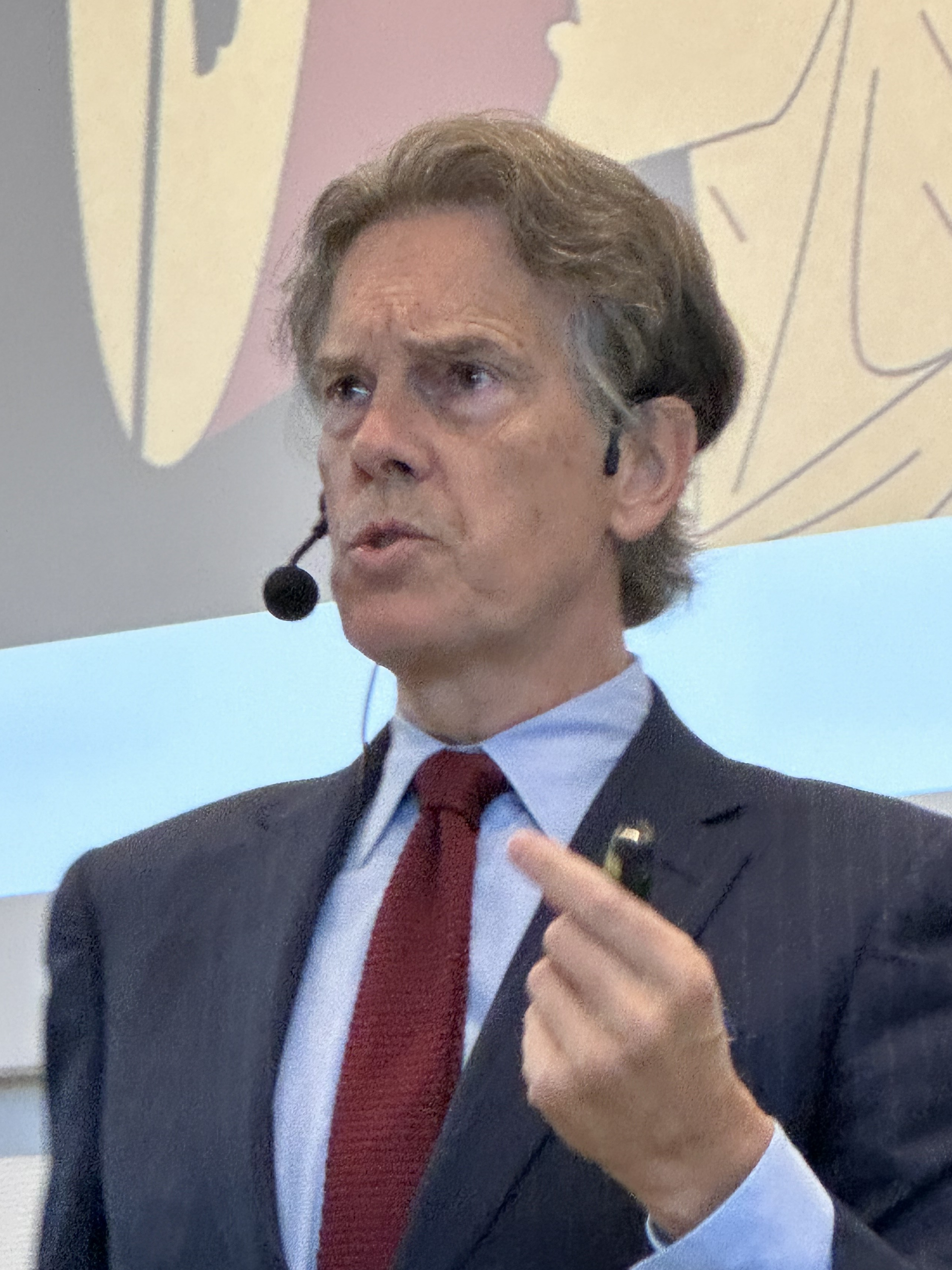
- Hicks lecturing in 2026
- Born: Stephen Ronald Craig Hicks; August 19, 1960 (age 66); Toronto, Ontario, Canada

Education
- Education: University of Guelph (BA, MA); Indiana University Bloomington (PhD)

Philosophical work
- Era: Contemporary philosophy
- Region: Western philosophy
- School: Analytic; Objectivism
- Institutions: Rockford University
- Main interests: Epistemology, business ethics
- Notable ideas: Criticism of postmodernism, entrepreneurism
- Website: www.stephenhicks.org

Stephen Ronald Craig Hicks (born August 19, 1960) is a Canadian-American philosopher. He teaches at Rockford University, where he also directs the Center for Ethics and Entrepreneurship.

== Career ==
Hicks earned his Bachelor of Arts (Honours, 1981) and Master of Arts degrees from the University of Guelph, and his Doctor of Philosophy (1991) from Indiana University Bloomington. The title of his doctoral thesis was "Foundationalism and the Genesis of Justification". Hicks is the author of six books and a documentary. Explaining Postmodernism: Skepticism and Socialism from Rousseau to Foucault (Scholargy, 2004) argues that postmodernism is best understood as a rhetorical strategy of the academic left developed in reaction to the failure of socialism, communism, and liberalism.

Hicks has published articles and essays on a range of subjects, including entrepreneurism, free speech in academia, the history and development of modern art, Ayn Rand's Objectivism, business ethics, and the philosophy of education, including a series of YouTube lectures. Hicks is also the co-editor, with David Kelley, of a critical thinking textbook, The Art of Reasoning: Readings for Logical Analysis (W. W. Norton & Co., second edition, 1998), Entrepreneurial Living with Jennifer Harrolle (CEEF, 2016), Liberalism Pro and Con (Connor Court, 2020), Art: Modern, Postmodern, and Beyond (with Michael Newberry, 2021) and Eight Philosophies of Education (with Andrew C. Colgan, forthcoming, 2023).

=== Explaining Postmodernism ===
Hicks is known for his book, Explaining Postmodernism. Hicks argues that postmodernism is

"anti-realist, holding that it is impossible to speak meaningfully about an independently existing reality. Postmodernism substitutes instead a social-linguistic, constructionist account of reality. Epistemologically, having rejected the notion of an independently existing reality, postmodernism denies that reason or any other method is a means of acquiring direct knowledge of that reality. . . . Postmodern accounts of human nature are consistently collectivist, holding that individuals’ identities are constructed largely by the social-linguistic groups they are a part of . . . postmodern themes in ethics and politics are characterized by an identification with and sympathy for the groups perceived to be oppressed in the conflicts, and a willingness to enter the fray on their behalf."

Professor Max Hocutt explains that Hick's book addresses two important questions: "why does postmodernist rhetoric display blatant disregard for accuracy and obvious contempt for civility?" and "why have 'postmodernist' intellectuals of the kind you find in English departments and Women's Studies programs, but not the Chemistry department, rejected Enlightenment belief in reason while embracing epistemological relativism and metaphysical nihilism instead?" Steven M. Sanders, professor emeritus of Philosophy at Bridgewater State College, writes:

With clarity, concision, and an engaging style, Hicks exposes the historical roots and philosophical assumptions of the postmodernist phenomenon. More than that, he raises key questions about the legacy of postmodernism and its implications for our intellectual attitudes and cultural life.

Author and lecturer Matt McManus criticised Explaining Postmodernism as misrepresenting much of Western philosophy and being "full of misreadings, suppositions, rhetorical hyperbole and even flat out factual errors."

=== Nietzsche and the Nazis ===
Hicks is known for his documentary and book, Nietzsche and the Nazis, which is an examination of the ideological and philosophical roots of Nazism, particularly how Friedrich Nietzsche's ideas were used and misused by Adolf Hitler and the Nazis to justify their beliefs and practices. This was released in 2006 as a video documentary, and then in 2010 as a book.

== Books ==
- Liberalism Pro and Con : A Primer (2024)
- Explaining Postmodernism: Skepticism and Socialism from Rousseau to Foucault (2013)
- What Business Ethics Can Learn From Entrepreneurship (2011)
- Nietzsche and the Nazis: A Personal View (2010)
- Free Speech & Postmodernism (2010)
