= Michael Newberry =

Michael Newberry is the name of:

- Michael Newberry (artist), American artist
- Michael Newberry (footballer) (1997–2024), English-Northern Irish footballer
