= James Cooper =

James Cooper may refer to:

== Arts and entertainment ==
- James Fenimore Cooper (1789–1851), American writer
- James Cooper (artist) (fl. 1940), African-American cane carving artisan
- James Cooper (producer), British podcaster

== Politics ==
- James Cooper (Pennsylvania politician) (1810–1863), American soldier and politician
- James Cooper (Northern Ireland politician) (1882–1949), MP in the Northern Ireland Parliament for Fermanagh and Tyrone
- James Cooper (Ontario politician) (1900–1979), Canadian politician

== Others ==
- James Fairlie Cooper (1814–1869), American soldier and minter
- James Graham Cooper (1830–1902), American surgeon and naturalist
- James Cooper (VC) (1840–1889), British soldier
- James Cooper (minister) (1846–1922), Church of Scotland minister and church historian
- James Scott Cooper (1874–1931), Canadian businessman and noted bootlegger
- James Cooper (shoe merchant), 19th-century Canadian shoe merchant who built James Cooper House
- James Cooper (pitcher) (born 1919), American baseball player
- James Cooper (coach) (born 1982), American college baseball coach

== See also ==
- Jim Cooper (disambiguation)
- Jimmy Cooper (disambiguation)
- James Couper (disambiguation)
