= Couper =

Couper is a surname. It may refer to:

- Archibald Scott Couper (1831–1892), Scottish chemist
- Barbara Couper (1903–1992), British actress
- George Couper (1824–1908), British civil servant in India
- Heather Couper (1949–2020), British astronomer, broadcaster and science populariser
- James Couper (disambiguation)
- Mildred Couper (1887–1974), American composer and pianist
- Rory Couper (born 1980), Scottish rugby union player
- Scott Couper (born 1970), Scottish gridiron football player
- William Couper (bishop) (1568–1619), Scottish bishop and theologian
- William Couper (naturalist) (fl. 1850s–1886), American entomologist and naturalist
- William Couper (sculptor) (1853–1942), American sculptor

== See also ==
- Couper baronets, a title in the Baronetage of the United Kingdom
- Couper Collection, an art collection
- Couper Islands, Nunavut, Canada
- Cooper (disambiguation)
