= Couper Collection =

Art gallery in Sussex, England

Coordinates: 51°28′51″N 0°10′08″W

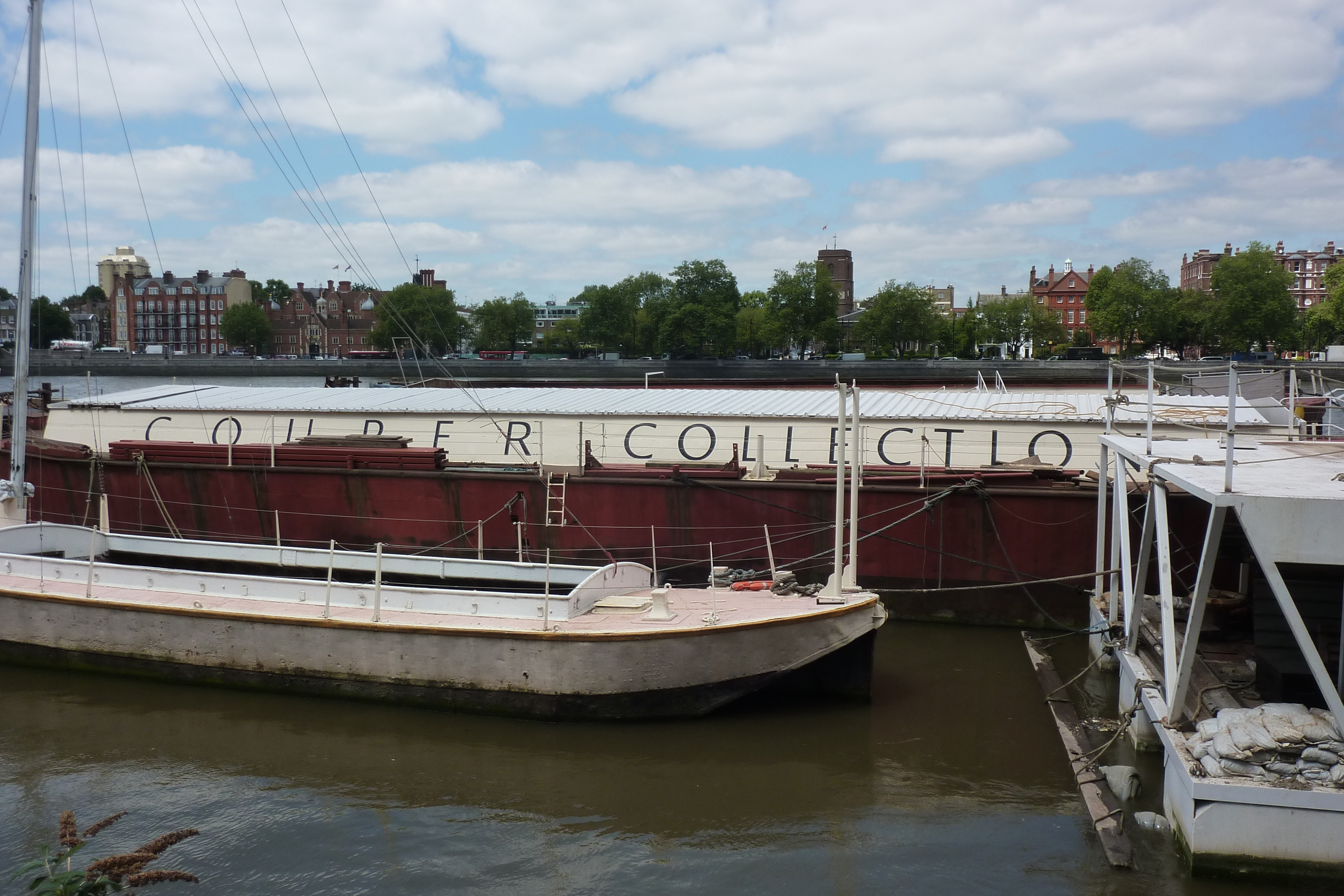
The Couper Collection barges at Battersea, in 2013

The Couper Collection is an internationally exhibited collection of artwork and installations by the British artist Max Couper, as well as a venue for exhibitions and events by other artists, and youth art education projects.

Based in Hove, Sussex since 2022, the Couper Collection for many years exhibited its art in a floating gallery on converted barges, moored on the banks of the Thames in Battersea, London.

Between 2001 and 2003 the Collection was a Focus Site of the London String of Pearls Golden Jubilee Festival, Patron Prince Charles.

The Couper Collection Diamond Jubilee Bridge was launched in a ceremony during the sail by Queen Elizabeth II and Charles, Prince of Wales during the 2012 Thames Jubilee Pageant.

== Works ==
Major works by Max Couper and the Couper Collection include:

- Couper's new artwork & costumes at Galerie Verbeeck Van Dyke, Antwerp (2021)
- Couper Collection's children's art exhibitions with the National Portrait Gallery London (2002)
- Couper's Thames Fleeting Opera with the Royal Opera House and Judi Dench (2000)
- Couper's exhibition at The Museum of Contemporary Art (MuHKA), Antwerp (1996)
- Couper's exhibition at the Sprengel Museum, Hanover (1997)
- Couper's exhibition at the Lehmbruck Museum of sculpture, Duisburg (1997)

== Challenged mooring rights & closure 2014–2022 ==
In 2006, the Couper Collection was involved a dispute with Hutchison Whampoa and the Port of London Authority regarding a land claim at Albion Riverside and Foster and Partners's plans to remove the charity's barges. Foster's lawyers, Farrer & Co, put in objections to the UK Land Registry. Max Couper claimed "ancient mooring rights", but in 2013 Justice Arnold ruled that the barges should be removed, and Hutchison Whampoa sought to enforce the ruling with a further High Court order to "dispose of or destroy" the gallery. The PLA offered alternative mooring sites, which Couper declined.

The litigation was long, and complex. Proceedings were first issued in 2006. The final judgement in the litigation was later in 2017, when Couper attempted to sue his solicitors and counsel in the earlier proceedings.

The vessels have been sold.

The Collection was re-incorporated in 2020 as a not-for-profit Community Interest Company (CIC). Registered as The Couper Collection Sussex CIC, its current directors in 2023 are Tim French MBE, Max Couper and Magdalena Couper.
