= Michael Newberry (artist) =

American painter

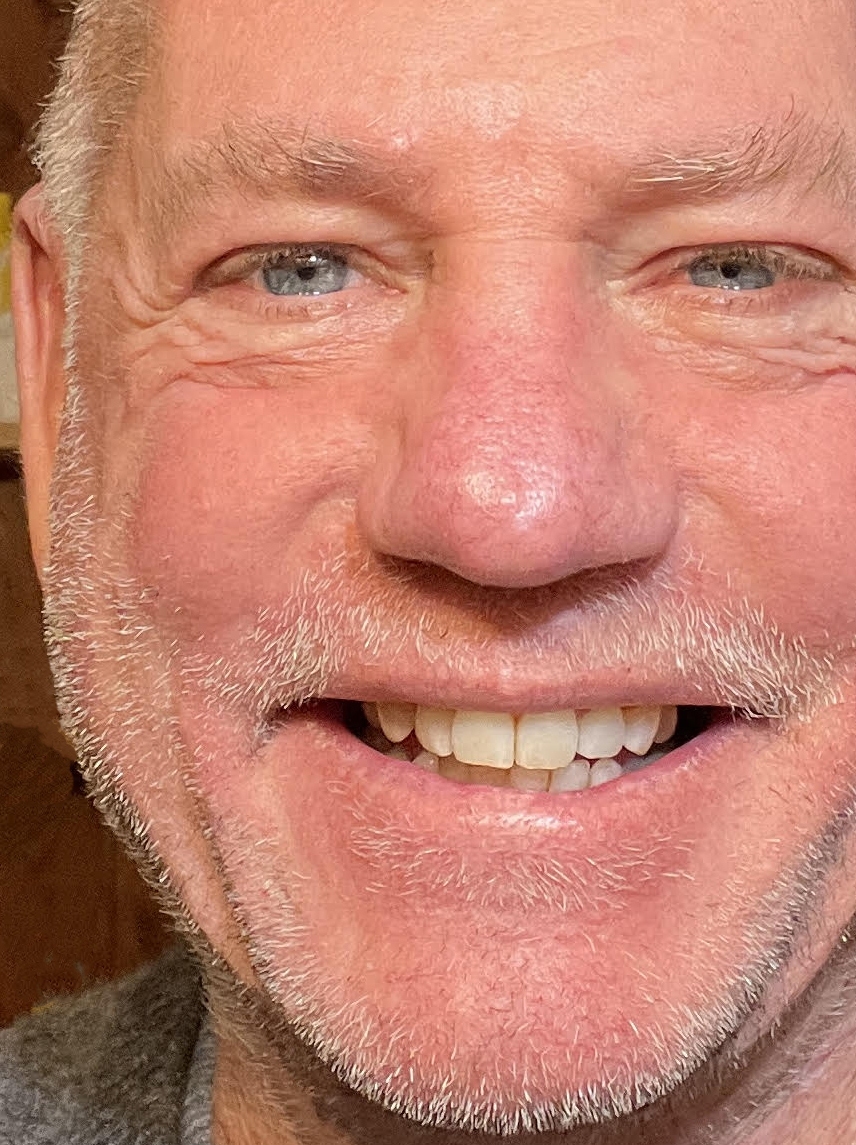
Self-portrait photograph of Michael Newberry, 2023.

Michael Newberry (born 1956) is an American neo-romantic figurative painter residing in Idyllwild, California. Influenced by French impressionism and Rembrandt, his major works are typically life-sized canvases. Newberry has exhibited in New York, Los Angeles, Santa Monica, Rome, Athens, and Brussels.

== Career ==
Newberry had a one-person show at NOHO Gallery in 1983. Writing in the New York Tribune, art critic James Cooper described Newberry as "an artist on [the] verge of stating a theme" following his first solo exhibition at the NOHO Gallery. Cooper wrote that Newberry's realism was "unmarred by affectation or compromise with abstractionist considerations," and that while his paintings contained "the necessary ingredients ... to create a statement," their message "was not yet clear."

Newberry exhibited work at the To Dendro Gallery in Rhodes in 1996. A review of the work in the local newspaper I Rodiaki (The Rhodian) stated that his works had "technical mastery and expressive power." Another 1996 article in the same local publication described Newberry's work as combining "strong draftsmanship" with "an unflinching sincerity, free of affectation or mysticism." A separate article by archaeologist and art historian Thodoris Archontopoulos in the same local newspaper described Newberry's process, beginning with studies in charcoal and pastel before moving to oil, as marked by "discipline, clarity, and emotional strength."

In 2001, Michael Newberry published a paper titled On Metaphysical Value-Judgments in The Journal of Ayn Rand Studies challenging Louis Torres and Michelle Marder Kamhi's interpretation of Ayn Rand's aesthetic theory in What Art Is: The Esthetic Theory of Ayn Rand. Kamhi and Torres replied in 2003, describing Newberry's interpretation as "facile" and "lamentably all too common among Objectivists."

Newberry taught in the past at Otis/Parsons Institute in Los Angeles.
