= Jim Cooper (disambiguation) =

Jim Cooper (born 1954) is the Member of the U.S. House of Representatives from Tennessee's 5th district.

Jim Cooper may also refer to:

- Jim Cooper (footballer) (born 1942), English footballer
- Jim Cooper (ceramicist) (born 1955), New Zealand potter
- Jim Cooper (American football) (born 1955), American football offensive lineman in the NFL
- Jim Cooper (California politician) (born 1964), member of the California State Assembly
- Jim Cooper (musician), American Christian musician, songwriter, and producer

== See also ==
- Jimmy Cooper (disambiguation)
- James Cooper (disambiguation)
