= James Couper =

James Couper may refer to:

- James Couper (politician) (1870–1946), Scottish politician
- James Couper (rugby union) (1873–1917), Scotland international rugby union player
- James Couper (astronomer) (1752–1836), professor of astronomy at the University of Glasgow
- James Hamilton Couper (1794–1866), American malacologist
- James Couper, of the Couper baronets
- James Couper (academic), identified Manganism

== See also ==
- James Cooper (disambiguation)
- Couper (disambiguation)
