= Jimmy Cooper =

Jimmy Cooper may refer to:

- Jimmy Cooper (musician) (1907–1977), Scottish hammered dulcimer player
- Jimmy Cooper (footballer) (born 1939), Scottish football winger
- Jimmy Cooper (boxer), American featherweight boxer from the 1940s and 1950s
- Jimmy Cooper, lead character from the film Quadrophenia
- Jimmy Cooper (The O.C.), fictional TV character from The O.C.

== See also ==
- Jim Cooper (disambiguation)
- James Cooper (disambiguation)
