= Loris Mouyokolo =

French footballer (born 2001)

Personal information
- Date of birth: 22 May 2001 (age 25)
- Place of birth: Drancy, France
- Height: 1.94 m (6 ft 4 in)
- Position: Defender

Team information
- Current team: Baltika Kaliningrad
- Number: 24

Youth career
- 2008–2020: Lorient

Senior career*
Years	Team	Apps	(Gls)
2018–2024	Lorient B	35	(0)
2020–2024	Lorient	2	(0)
2022	→ Bourg-Péronnas (loan)	12	(0)
2022–2023	→ Rodez (loan)	16	(0)
2024–2026	Grenoble	52	(1)
2026–	Baltika Kaliningrad	11	(1)
- * Club domestic league appearances and goals as of 21 November 2026

Loris Mouyokolo (born 22 May 2001) is a French professional footballer who plays as a defender for Russian club Baltika Kaliningrad.

== Career ==
Loris Mouyokolo is a youth product of the FC Lorient academy, having joined the Bretons aged only 7.

Having played a few friendly games with the Merlus in the 2020 summer, he signed his first professional contract with the club on 16 November 2020.

Mouyokolo made his professional debut for Lorient on 16 December 2020 in a Ligue 1 game against PSG. He came on as a substitute of Thomas Fontaine in at the 73rd, as Lorient had already seen their central defender Andreaw Gravillon sent out, and were losing 2–0 at the Parc des Princes, the score not changing after Mouyokolo's entry.

On 24 January 2022, Mouyokolo joined Bourg-Péronnas on loan.

On 9 August 2022, Mouyokolo was loaned to Rodez in Ligue 2.

On 1 August 2026, Mouyokolo signed a four-season contract with Baltika Kaliningrad in the Russian Premier League.

== Personal life ==
Born in France, Mouyokolo is of Congolese descent.

== Career statistics ==
As of 21 November 2026

Club	Season	League			Cup		Total	
Club	Season	Division	Apps	Goals	Apps	Goals	Apps	Goals
Lorient B	2017–18	Championnat National 2	0	0	—		0	0
Lorient B	2018–19	Championnat National 2	5	0	—		5	0
Lorient B	2019–20	Championnat National 2	12	0	—		12	0
Lorient B	2020–21	Championnat National 2	7	0	—		7	0
Lorient B	2021–22	Championnat National 2	8	0	—		8	0
Lorient B	2023–24	Championnat National 2	3	0	—		3	0
Lorient B	Total		35	0	0	0	35	0
Lorient	2020–21	Ligue 1	1	0	2	0	3	0
Lorient	2021–22	Ligue 1	0	0	0	0	0	0
Lorient	2022–23	Ligue 1	0	0	—		0	0
Lorient	2023–24	Ligue 1	1	0	1	0	2	0
Lorient	Total		2	0	3	0	5	0
Bourg-Péronnas (loan)	2021–22	Championnat National	12	0	—		12	0
Rodez (loan)	2022–23	Ligue 2	16	0	3	0	19	0
Grenoble	2024–25	Ligue 2	25	1	1	0	26	1
Grenoble	2025–26	Ligue 2	27	0	2	0	29	0
Grenoble	Total		52	1	3	0	55	1
Baltika Kaliningrad	2026–27	Russian Premier League	11	1	3	0	14	1
Career total			128	2	12	0	140	2
