= Sébastien Cibois =

French footballer (born 1998)

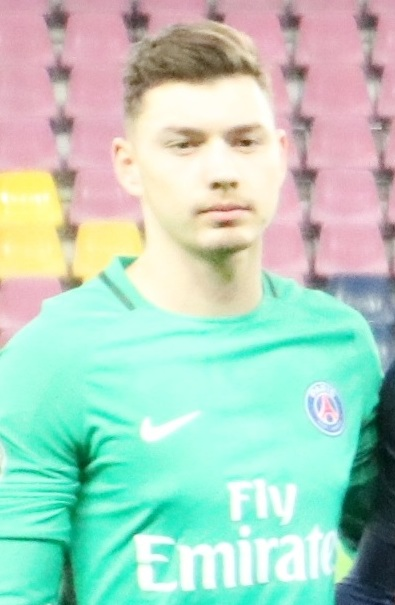
- Cibois with Paris Saint-Germain U19 in 2017

Personal information
- Full name: Sébastien Cibois
- Date of birth: 2 March 1998 (age 28)
- Place of birth: Argenteuil, France
- Height: 1.92 m (6 ft 4 in)
- Position: Goalkeeper

Team information
- Current team: Portimonense
- Number: 77

Youth career
- 2012–2017: Paris Saint-Germain

Senior career*
| Years | Team | Apps | (Gls) |
| 2017–2019 | Paris Saint-Germain B | 36 | (0) |
| 2019 | Paris Saint-Germain | 0 | (0) |
| 2020–2022 | Brest B | 3 | (0) |
| 2020–2021 | Brest | 3 | (0) |
| 2022–2025 | Rodez | 24 | (0) |
| 2025– | Portimonense | 15 | (0) |
- * Club domestic league appearances and goals as of 20 June 2026

Sébastien Cibois (born 2 March 1998) is a French professional footballer who plays as a goalkeeper for Liga Portugal 2 club Portimonense.

== Career ==
=== Paris Saint-Germain ===
Cibois signed his first professional contract with Paris Saint-Germain (PSG) on 28 May 2018, a deal until 30 June 2021. He continued making appearances for the reserve team of PSG during the 2018–19 season. However, on 3 September 2019, Cibois decided to terminate his contract with the Parisian club. This was largely due to the fact that he went further down in the goalkeeper hierarchy with the arrival of Marcin Bułka from Chelsea.

=== Brest ===
On 7 January 2020, Cibois signed a two-and-a-half-year contract with Brest. He made his professional debut in a 2–1 Ligue 1 win over Bordeaux on 7 February 2021, over one year later. On 10 February, Cibois made his Coupe de France debut in a 2–1 victory against Rodez. He kept his first clean sheet in a 0–0 draw against Lille four days later.

=== Rodez ===
On 4 June 2022, Cibois joined Rodez on a three-year contract.

=== Portimonense ===
On 4 July 2025, Cibois signed a two-year contract with Portimonense.

== Career statistics ==
As of match played 6 December 2024

Appearances and goals by club, season and competition
| Club | Season | League | | | Cup | | Other | | Total | |
| Club | Season | Division | Apps | Goals | Apps | Goals | Apps | Goals | Apps | Goals |
|---|---|---|---|---|---|---|---|---|---|---|
| Paris Saint-Germain B | 2016–17 | CFA | 1 | 0 | — | | — | | 1 | 0 |
| Paris Saint-Germain B | 2017–18 | National 2 | 13 | 0 | — | | — | | 13 | 0 |
| Paris Saint-Germain B | 2018–19 | National 2 | 22 | 0 | — | | — | | 22 | 0 |
| Paris Saint-Germain B | Total | | 36 | 0 | — | | — | | 36 | 0 |
| Brest B | 2019–20 | National 3 | 1 | 0 | — | | — | | 1 | 0 |
| Brest B | 2021–22 | National 3 | 2 | 0 | — | | — | | 2 | 0 |
| Brest B | Total | | 3 | 0 | — | | — | | 3 | 0 |
| Brest | 2020–21 | Ligue 1 | 3 | 0 | 2 | 0 | — | | 5 | 0 |
| Rodez | 2022–23 | Ligue 2 | 8 | 0 | 5 | 0 | — | | 13 | 0 |
| Rodez | 2023–24 | Ligue 2 | 13 | 0 | 4 | 0 | 0 | 0 | 17 | 0 |
| Rodez | 2024–25 | Ligue 2 | 3 | 0 | 1 | 0 | — | | 4 | 0 |
| Rodez | Total | | 24 | 0 | 10 | 0 | 0 | 0 | 34 | 0 |
| Career total | | | 50 | 0 | 12 | 0 | 0 | 0 | 62 | 0 |

== Honours ==
Paris Saint-Germain U19

- Championnat National U19: 2015–16
- UEFA Youth League runner-up: 2015–16
