= Albion Riverside =

Residential development in Battersea, London

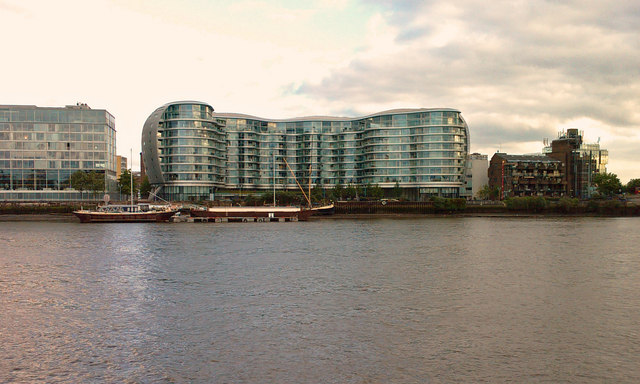

General information
- Status: Standing
- Coordinates: 51°28′49″N 0°10′11″W

Design and construction
- Architect: Foster and Partners

Website
- Official website

Albion Riverside, in Battersea in London, is a high-end residential development located between Albert Bridge and Battersea Bridge on the River Thames.

Completed in 2003 for client Hutchison Whampoa Property, it was designed by Foster and Partners in a high-tech modernist style to include an unusual asymmetrical crescent plan for the primary building with two independent rectilinear blocks to the west.

The architect's own office, built in 1990, is immediately alongside to the east.
