= Clément Depres =

French footballer (born 1994)

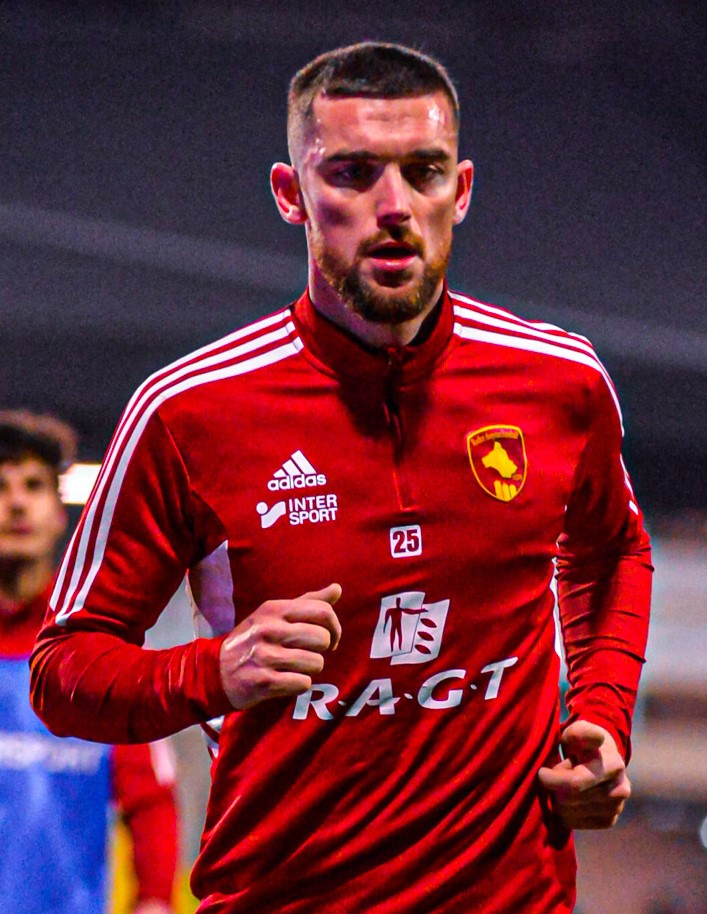
- Depres in 2022

Personal information
- Date of birth: 25 November 1994 (age 31)
- Place of birth: Nîmes, France
- Height: 1.88 m (6 ft 2 in)
- Position: Forward

Team information
- Current team: Nîmes
- Number: 9

Youth career
- 2002–2007: SO Codognan
- 2007–2012: US du Trèfles Sommières

Senior career*
Years	Team	Apps	(Gls)
2012–2018	Nîmes II	55	(23)
2014–2021	Nîmes	53	(6)
2016–2017	→ Châteauroux (loan)	8	(1)
2021	Rodez II	1	(0)
2021–2023	Rodez	82	(12)
2024–2025	Ratchaburi	24	(11)
2025–	Nîmes	14	(6)
- * Club domestic league appearances and goals as of 7 February 2026

Clément Depres (born 25 November 1994) is a French professional footballer who plays as a forward for Championnat National 1 club Nîmes.

Depres started his career at Nîmes in 2014, making 52 league appearances before suffering an ACL in early 2019, whilst he also had a spell on loan at Châteauroux. Following his return from injury, he signed for Rodez in 2021.

== Early and personal life ==
Depres was born in Nîmes to parents originally from Pas-de-Calais. He grew up in Mus. As a child, Depres was a supporter of RC Lens. Whilst in the youth teams at Nîmes, he obtained qualifications in accounting.

== Club career ==
=== Nîmes ===
Having played youth football for SO Codognan and US du Trèfles Sommières, depres joined Nîmes' youth team aged 17. During Depres' first season with the reserve team, he had a right cruciate ligament injury, leaving him unavailable for most of the season, leading Depres to take up academy coaching at Nîmes. On 21 November 2014, Depres made his first team debut for Nîmes in a 2–0 Ligue 2 defeat at Créteil-Lusitanos, whilst the club was embroiled in a match fixing scandal. He signed his first professional contract with Nîmes in June 2015. Between his first team debut and the end of October 2016, Depres made 16 league appearances for the club, all as a substitute.

==== Châteauroux (loan) ====
On 1 November 2016, Depres joined Championnat National club Châteauroux on loan until the end of the season. In January 2017, Depres fractured the cartilage in his ankle in a 1–0 victory over Boulogne, and subsequently had an operation on the ankle. He did not appear again during the 2016–17 season, having scored once in 8 appearances prior to his injury.

Depres made his first start for Nîmes on 8 September 2017 in a 4–1 win over Ajaccio, and scored his first goal later that month in a 4–0 win over Tours. He scored twice in 19 matches as the club were promoted to Ligue 1. On 23 January 2019, Depres scored twice in a 3–1 victory over Angers before rupturing his anterior cruciate ligament later in the game. As a result, Depres left the pitch on a stretcher and was immediately taken to hospital to undergo examinations. He had scored 4 times in 17 appearances across the 2018–19 season prior to his injury. Despite the injury ruling him out of first team action until at least the following season, Depres extended his Nîmes contract until 2022 in March 2019. Having had surgery on his left knee shortly following his injury, Depres returned to individual training around the start of 2020, though had a further operation on his knee in summer 2020. He returned to Nîmes' first team squad in May 2021, and appeared as a substitute in the club's final match of the season, a 2–0 defeat to Rennes on 23 May, as Nîmes were relegated.

=== Rodez ===
In summer 2021, Depres signed for Ligue 2 club Rodez on a three-year contract. He left Nîmes amidst dispute between himself and club president Rani Assaf. He scored his first goal for the club on 21 August 2021 in a 4–1 win over Valenciennes . He scored 4 goals in 27 appearances across the 2021–22 season, and scored 7 times in 34 games across the 2022–23 season.

=== Ratchaburi ===
On 3 July 2024, Depres travelled to Southeast Asia where he joined Thai League 1 club Ratchaburi. He make his debut on 11 August in a 3–2 lost to Nakhon Pathom United. Depres then scored his first goal for the club in a 4–1 win over BG Pathum United on 25 August.

== Career statistics ==
As of 13 April 2024

Appearances and goals by club, season and competition
Club	Season	League			Cup		League Cup		Continental		Other		Total	
Club	Season	Division	Apps	Goals	Apps	Goals	Apps	Goals	Apps	Goals	Apps	Goals	Apps	Goals
Nîmes II	2012–13	CFA 2	9	2	—		—		—		—		9	2
Nîmes II	2013–14	CFA 2	2	1	—		—		—		—		2	1
Nîmes II	2014–15	CFA 2	19	7	—		—		—		—		19	7
Nîmes II	2015–16	CFA 2	14	5	—		—		—		—		14	5
Nîmes II	2016–17	CFA 2	3	1	—		—		—		—		3	1
Nîmes II	2017–18	National 3	8	7	—		—		—		—		8	7
Nîmes II	total		55	23	—		—		—		—		55	23
Nîmes	2014–15	Ligue 2	4	0	1	0	—		—		—		5	0
Nîmes	2015–16	Ligue 2	7	0	1	0	0	0	—		—		8	0
Nîmes	2016–17	Ligue 2	5	0	—		1	0	—		—		6	0
Nîmes	2017–18	Ligue 2	19	2	2	0	1	0	—		—		22	2
Nîmes	2018–19	Ligue 1	17	4	1	0	2	0	—		—		20	4
Nîmes	2019–20	Ligue 1	0	0	0	0	0	0	—		—		0	0
Nîmes	2020–21	Ligue 1	1	0	0	0	—		—		—		1	0
Nîmes	Total		53	6	5	0	4	0	—		—		62	6
Châteauroux (loan)	2016–17	National	8	1	2	4	—		—		—		10	5
Rodez II	2021–22	National 3	1	0	—		—		—		—		1	0
Rodez	2021–22	Ligue 2	27	4	0	0	—		—		—		27	4
Rodez	2022–23	Ligue 2	34	7	3	0	—		—		—		37	7
Rodez	2023–24	Ligue 2	21	1	4	2	—		—		—		25	3
Rodez	Total		82	12	7	2	—		—		—		89	14
Career total			199	42	14	6	4	0	0	0	0	0	217	48
