= Éric Vandenabeele =

French footballer (born 1991)

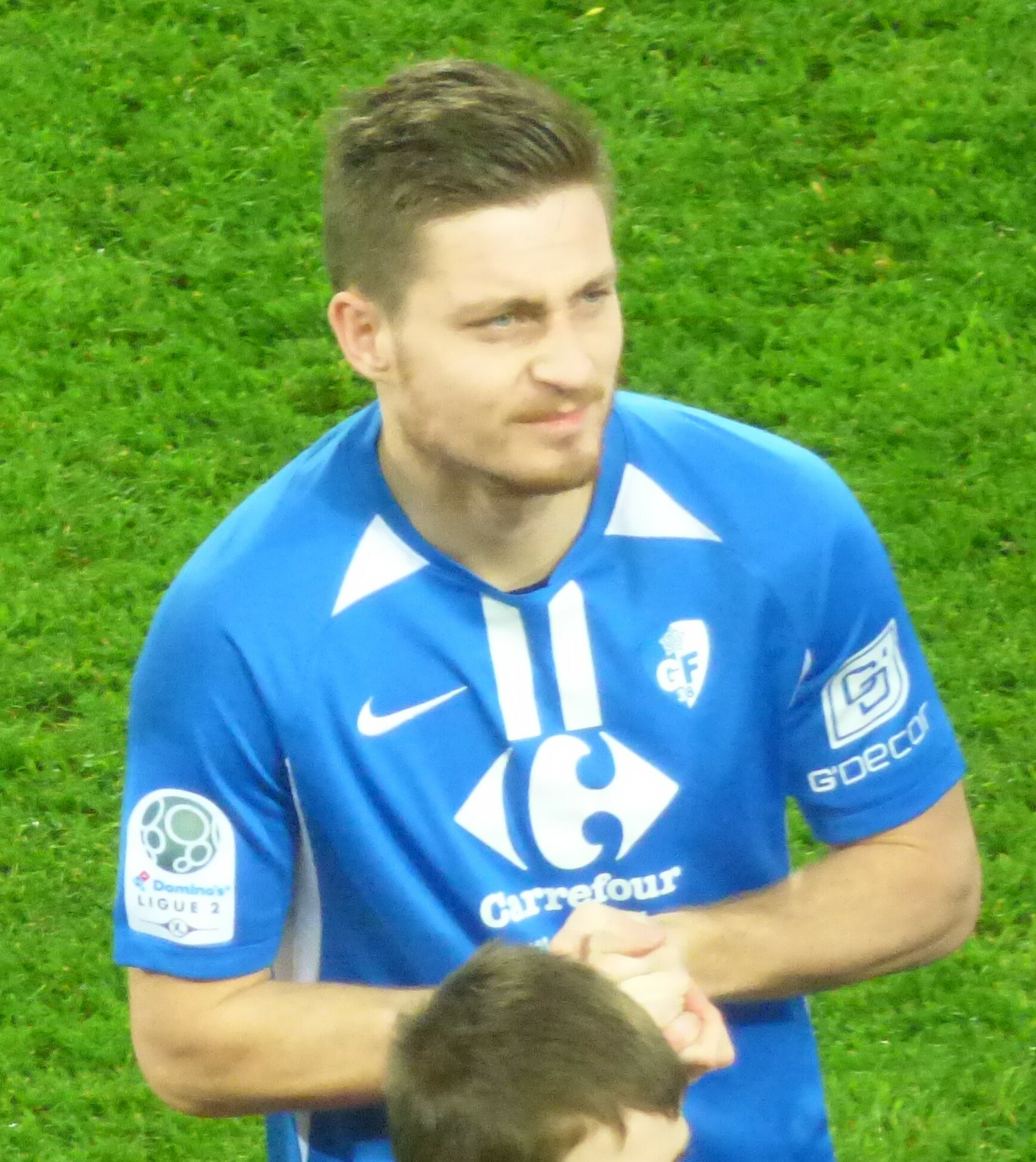
- Vandenabeele in 2020

Personal information
- Date of birth: 16 December 1991 (age 34)
- Place of birth: Calais, France
- Height: 1.85 m (6 ft 1 in)
- Position: Centre-back

Youth career
- 1997–2006: Calais
- 2006–2012: Boulogne

Senior career*
Years	Team	Apps	(Gls)
2012–2016	Boulogne	71	(4)
2016–2020	Grenoble	102	(6)
2020–2022	Valenciennes	27	(2)
2021–2022	Valenciennes B	5	(1)
2022–2025	Rodez	48	(1)
2025–2026	Bordeaux	3	(0)
- * Club domestic league appearances and goals as of 4 December 2025

Éric Vandenabeele (born 16 December 1991) is a French professional footballer who plays as a centre-back.

== Career ==
A native of Calais, Vandenabeele began his footballing career in the youth system at his hometown team Calais RUFC in 1997. He spent nine years with the club before transferring to Boulogne in 2006. He made his senior debut on 7 August 2012 in the defeat to Chamois Niortais in the first round of the Coupe de la Ligue, and went on to play more than 70 matches for the club over the next four seasons.

Vandenabeele joined Grenoble Foot 38 in the summer of 2016.

On 30 August 2022, Vandenabeele signed a three-year contract with Rodez.

== Career statistics ==
As of 18 July 2020.

Appearances and goals by club, season and competition
Club	Season	League			Cup		League Cup		Other		Total	
Club	Season	Division	Apps	Goals	Apps	Goals	Apps	Goals	Apps	Goals	Apps	Goals
Boulogne	2012–13	National	16	0	1	0	1	0	–		18	0
Boulogne	2013–14	National	13	0	4	0	0	0	–		17	0
Boulogne	2014–15	National	22	1	7	0	0	0	–		29	1
Boulogne	2015–16	National	20	3	4	0	0	0	–		24	3
Boulogne	Total		71	4	16	0	1	0	0	0	88	4
Grenoble	2016–17	CFA Group C	24	0	2	0	–		–		26	0
Grenoble	2017–18	National	29	2	3	0	–		2	0	34	2
Grenoble	2018–19	Ligue 2	27	2	1	0	1	0	–		29	2
Grenoble	2019–20	Ligue 2	22	2	1	0	2	0	–		25	2
Grenoble	Total		102	6	7	0	3	0	2	0	114	6
Career total			173	10	23	0	4	0	2	0	202	10
