= James Cooper (artist) =

James Cooper, a.k.a. "Stick Daddy," was one of several African American artisans associated with the cane carving tradition in coastal Georgia during the early twentieth century. Ethnographers and art historians have seen this tradition as evidence of the persistence of African visual and cultural motifs into North America and modern period.

== Biography ==
Cooper's birth and death dates are not known. He made a living through miscellaneous jobs and repair services, which he conducted with a push-cart that he rolled through Savannah. He was known also to sell lunches to workers on break from the Savannah Sugar Refinery.

While he had never received formal instruction in art making or wood carving, he recalled to New Deal ethnographers that his grandfather had made baskets, chairs, and tables, working in the mediums of carpentry, cane-weaving, and basketry. Carving ornamental walking sticks was something Cooper had taken up "just for fun," but he imagined he "sort of inherited" his talent from his grandfather.

== "Drums and Shadows," 1940 ==
His work and practice is known because of its inclusion in Mary Granger's Drums and Shadows (1940), a book of ethnography conducted under the auspices of the New Deal's Federal Writers' Project. The book contains multiple oral histories recorded from black informants then living in coastal Georgia. These personal accounts reproduced in dialect in the book.

== Cane Carving Techniques and Style ==
Historian of African American folk art practices, John Michael Vlach, has called carved walking sticks "perhaps the most sophisticate form in the Georgia tradition." Cooper carved thin canes, especially elegant in silhouette and design. As with other cane carvers in the African American tradition, Cooper frequently featured reptiles in his designs. His turtles, lizards, alligators, and snakes appeared on his canes in graphic relief, which he achieved through a combination of deeply carved outlines and staining techniques. His carved figures, which he polished, stood out above the grain of the wood, which he left natural.

In Drums and Shadows, it was reported that Cooper occasionally employed mixed media techniques, embedding everyday objects or even photographs into the canes' handles. In one case, a cane featured a "snapshot of a young [African American] girl."
