= Abdel-Hakim Abdallah =

Footballer (born 1997)

Akim Abdallah
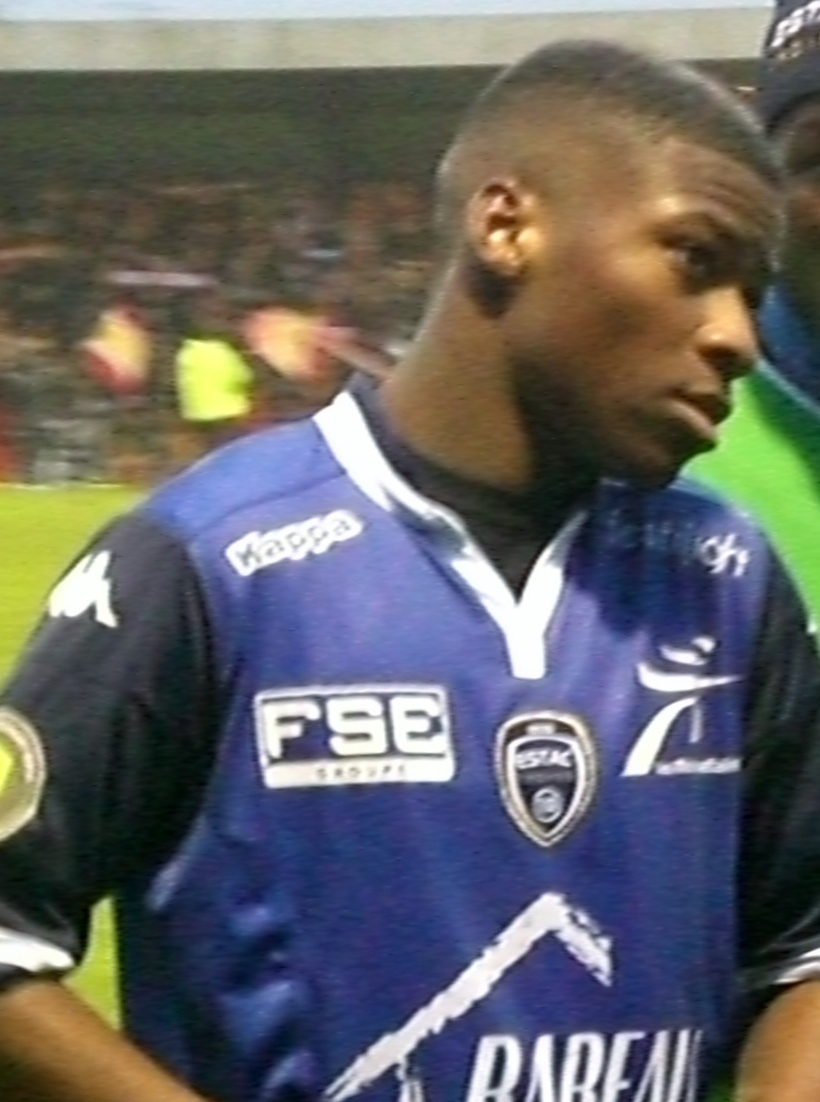
- Abdallah with Troyes B in 2016

Personal information
- Full name: Abdel-Hakim Abdallah
- Date of birth: 18 August 1997 (age 29)
- Place of birth: Troyes, France
- Height: 1.70 m (5 ft 7 in)
- Position: Defender

Team information
- Current team: Pau
- Number: 97

Senior career*
Years	Team	Apps	(Gls)
2015–2019	Troyes B	51	(3)
2017–2019	Troyes	1	(0)
2018–2019	→ Tours (loan)	32	(0)
2019–2022	Grenoble	57	(1)
2022–2025	Rodez	104	(2)
2025–2026	Guingamp	27	(0)
2026–	Pau	2	(0)

International career^{‡}
2017–	Comoros	29	(0)
- * Club domestic league appearances and goals as of 4 September 2026 ‡ National team caps and goals as of 18 August 2026

Abdel-Hakim Abdallah (born 18 August 1997) is a professional footballer who plays for Ligue 2 club Pau. Born in France, he plays for the Comoros national team.

== Club career ==
Abdallah made his professional debut with Troyes AC in a 1–0 Ligue 2 loss to Stade Lavallois on 20 January 2017.

On 11 July 2022, Abdallah signed a three-year contract with Rodez.

== International career ==
Abdallah made his debut for the Comoros national team in a 0–0 friendly tie with Mauritania on 6 October 2017.

On 11 December 2025, Abdallah was called up to the Comoros squad for the 2025 Africa Cup of Nations.

== Career statistics ==
=== International ===
As of match played 9 June 2026

Appearances and goals by national team and year
National team	Year	Apps	Goals
Comoros	2017	1	0
Comoros	2018	–	
Comoros	2019	–	
Comoros	2020	–	
Comoros	2021	–	
Comoros	2022	3	0
Comoros	2023	3	0
Comoros	2024	10	0
Comoros	2025	9	0
Comoros	2026	3	0
Total		29	0
