= Louis Torres =

French footballer (born 2001)

Personal information
- Full name: Louis Torres Dattero
- Date of birth: 29 April 2001 (age 25)
- Place of birth: Nice, France
- Height: 1.80 m (5 ft 11 in)
- Position: Left-back

Youth career
- 2011–2014: Cavigal Nice
- 2014–2020: Monaco

Senior career*
Years	Team	Apps	(Gls)
2020–2022	Monaco II	22	(2)
2022–2024	Cercle Brugge	10	(1)
2023	→ Rodez (loan)	10	(0)
- * Club domestic league appearances and goals as of 2 June 2024

Louis Torres Dattero (born 29 April 2001) is a French professional footballer who plays as a left-back.

== Professional career ==
A youth product of Cavigal Nice, Torres moved to the youth academy of Monaco at the age of 13. Promoted to their reserves in 2020 where he became a starter, he signed a professional contract with the club on 12 April 2022. On 19 July 2022, he transferred to the Belgian club Cercle Brugge. He made his professional debut with Cercle Brugge in a 2–0 Belgian First Division A loss to Westerlo on 24 July 2022, coming on as a substitute in the 83rd minute. In his first full start with the club, he scored the game-winning goal in a 1–0 win over Anderlecht on 30 July 2022.

On 1 February 2023, Torres was loaned to Ligue 2 club Rodez until the end of the 2022–23 season.

== Personal life ==
Born in France, Torres is of Spanish descent with Catalan roots. He is a fan of FC Barcelona.

== Playing style ==
An attacking midfielder in his youth, Torres was retrained to play as a left-back at U19 level. He is known for his speed, and is not afraid to get into contact.
