= Andy Pembélé =

French footballer (born 2000)

Personal information
- Date of birth: 4 July 2000 (age 26)
- Place of birth: Gonesse, France
- Height: 1.77 m (5 ft 10 in)
- Position: Forward

Senior career*
Years	Team	Apps	(Gls)
2018–2019	Caen B	8	(1)
2019–2020	Lille B	13	(0)
2020	Paris FC B	3	(1)
2020–2025	Paris FC	4	(0)
2021–2022	→ Créteil (loan)	24	(3)
2021–2022	→ Créteil B (loan)	2	(0)
2022–2023	→ Rodez (loan)	17	(1)
2022–2023	→ Rodez B (loan)	3	(2)
2025–2026	Bourg-Péronnas	12	(0)
- * Club domestic league appearances and goals as of 23 June 2026

Andy Pembélé (born 4 July 2000) is a French professional footballer who plays as a forward.

== Career ==
On 16 September 2020, Pembélé signed a professional contract with Paris FC. He made his professional debut with Paris FC in a 3–0 Ligue 2 win over Le Havre on 3 October 2020.

On 19 July 2021, Pembélé moved to Créteil on a season-long loan. On 18 August 2022, he was loaned to Rodez.

On 7 October 2025, Pembélé joined Bourg-Péronnas in Championnat National.

== Personal life ==
Born in France, Pembélé is of DR Congolese descent.
