= List of French football transfers winter 2022–23 =

This is a list of French football transfers for the 2022–23 winter transfer window. Only transfers featuring Ligue 1 and Ligue 2 are listed.

== Ligue 1 ==
Note: Flags indicate national team as has been defined under FIFA eligibility rules. Players may hold more than one non-FIFA nationality.

=== Paris Saint-Germain ===
In:

No.	Pos.	Nation	Player

Out:

No.	Pos.	Nation	Player
1	GK	CRC	Keylor Navas (on loan to (England) Nottingham Forest)
19	MF	ESP	Pablo Sarabia (to (England) Wolverhampton Wanderers)
36	MF	FRA	Ayman Kari (on loan to Lorient)
—	GK	MAD	Mathyas Randriamamy (on loan to Sète 34)
—	MF	ESP	Ander Herrera (to (Spain) Athletic Bilbao, previously on loan)

=== Marseille ===
In:

No.	Pos.	Nation	Player
8	MF	MAR	Azzedine Ounahi (from Angers)
9	FW	POR	Vitinha (from (Portugal) Braga)
18	MF	UKR	Ruslan Malinovskyi (on loan from (Italy) Atalanta)

Out:

No.	Pos.	Nation	Player
8	MF	BRA	Gerson (to (Brazil) Flamengo)
11	FW	COL	Luis Suárez (on loan to (Spain) Almería)
12	FW	SEN	Bamba Dieng (to Lorient)
18	DF	FRA	Isaak Touré (on loan to Auxerre)
22	MF	SEN	Pape Gueye (on loan to (Spain) Sevilla)
32	FW	FRA	Salim Ben Seghir (on loan to Valenciennes)
—	MF	MAR	Oussama Targhalline (to Le Havre, previously on loan at (Turkey) Alanyaspor)

=== Monaco ===
In:

No.	Pos.	Nation	Player

Out:

No.	Pos.	Nation	Player
5	DF	FRA	Benoît Badiashile (to (England) Chelsea)
13	FW	FRA	Willem Geubbels (to (Switzerland) St. Gallen)
29	MF	FRA	Félix Lemaréchal (on loan to Brest)
—	DF	FRA	Arthur Zagré (on loan to (Netherlands) Excelsior, previously on loan at (Netherlands) Utrecht)
—	FW	NED	Anthony Musaba (on loan to (Netherlands) NEC, previously on loan at Metz)
—	GK	FRA	Benjamin Lecomte (to Montpellier, previously on loan at (Spain) Espanyol)

=== Rennes ===
In:

No.	Pos.	Nation	Player
17	FW	CMR	Karl Toko Ekambi (on loan from Lyon)
34	FW	BEL	Ibrahim Salah (from (England) Gent)
90	DF	ENG	Djed Spence (on loan from (England) Tottenham Hotspur)

Out:

No.	Pos.	Nation	Player
10	FW	GHA	Kamaldeen Sulemana (to (England) Southampton)
16	GK	SEN	Alfred Gomis (on loan to (Italy) Como)
28	FW	FRA	Matthis Abline (on loan to Auxerre)
35	MF	FRA	Noah Françoise (on loan to Avranches)
—	DF	FRA	Loïc Badé (on loan to (Spain) Sevilla, previously on loan at (England) Nottingham Forest)

=== Nice ===
In:

No.	Pos.	Nation	Player
9	FW	NGA	Terem Moffi (on loan from Lorient)
55	MF	BDI	Youssouf Ndayishimiye (from (Turkey) İstanbul Başakşehir)

Out:

No.	Pos.	Nation	Player
5	DF	DEN	Mads Bech Sørensen (loan return to (England) Brentford)
6	MF	FRA	Morgan Schneiderlin (on loan to (Australia) Western Sydney Wanderers)
7	FW	ALG	Andy Delort (on loan to Nantes)
18	MF	ROU	Rareș Ilie (on loan to (Israel) Maccabi Tel Aviv)
97	MF	FRA	Lucas Da Cunha (to (Italy) Como)
99	MF	GAB	Mario Lemina (to (England) Wolverhampton Wanderers)
—	DF	BRA	Robson Bambu (on loan to (Brazil) Vasco da Gama, previously on loan at (Brazil) Corinthians)
—	FW	DEN	Kasper Dolberg (on loan to (Germany) TSG 1899 Hoffenheim, previously on loan at (Spain) Sevilla)
—	FW	IRL	Deji Sotona (to (England) Burnley, previously on loan at (Scotland) Kilmarnock)

=== Strasbourg ===
In:

No.	Pos.	Nation	Player
8	MF	FRA	Morgan Sanson (on loan from (England) Aston Villa)
18	MF	JPN	Yuito Suzuki (on loan from (Japan) Shimizu S-Pulse)
32	DF	FRA	Frédéric Guilbert (from (England) Aston Villa)
77	DF	UKR	Eduard Sobol (from (Belgium) Club Brugge)

Out:

No.	Pos.	Nation	Player
4	DF	POL	Karol Fila (on loan to (Belgium) Zulte Waregem)
10	MF	FRA	Adrien Thomasson (to Lens)
18	DF	FRA	Ronaël Pierre-Gabriel (loan return to (Germany) Mainz 05)
25	FW	FRA	Ludovic Ajorque (to (Germany) Mainz 05)

=== Lens ===
In:

No.	Pos.	Nation	Player
20	MF	FRA	Angelo Fulgini (on loan from (Germany) Mainz 05)
28	MF	FRA	Adrien Thomasson (from Strasbourg)

Out:

No.	Pos.	Nation	Player

=== Lyon ===
In:

No.	Pos.	Nation	Player
5	DF	CRO	Dejan Lovren (from (Russia) Zenit)
7	FW	SWE	Amin Sarr (from (Netherlands) Heerenveen)
27	DF	FRA	Malo Gusto (on loan from (England) Chelsea)
47	FW	BRA	Jeffinho (from (Brazil) Botafogo)

Out:

No.	Pos.	Nation	Player
7	FW	CMR	Karl Toko Ekambi (on loan to Rennes)
11	FW	BRA	Tetê (loan return to (Ukraine) Shakhtar Donetsk)
15	MF	FRA	Romain Faivre (on loan to Lorient)
21	DF	FRA	Damien Da Silva (to (Australia) Melbourne Victory)
22	MF	FRA	Jeff Reine-Adélaïde (on loan to Troyes)
27	DF	FRA	Malo Gusto (to (England) Chelsea)
30	GK	GER	Julian Pollersbeck (on loan to Lorient)
—	MF	FRA	Florent Da Silva (on loan to (Netherlands) Volendam)
—	MF	BRA	Camilo (on loan to (Belgium) Molenbeek, previously on loan at (Brazil) Cuiabá)

=== Nantes ===
In:

No.	Pos.	Nation	Player
25	MF	FRA	Florent Mollet (from (Germany) Schalke 04)
26	DF	FRA	Jaouen Hadjam (from Paris FC)
38	DF	BRA	João Victor (on loan from (Portugal) Benfica)
99	FW	ALG	Andy Delort (on loan from Nice)

Out:

No.	Pos.	Nation	Player
2	DF	BRA	Fábio (to (Brazil) Grêmio)
12	DF	FRA	Dennis Appiah (to Saint-Étienne)
19	MF	FRA	Mohamed Achi (on loan to Paris 13 Atletico)
55	MF	FRA	Kader Bamba (on loan to Saint-Étienne)
61	FW	FRA	Joe-Loïc Affamah (on loan to (Portugal) Torreense)

=== Lille ===
In:

No.	Pos.	Nation	Player
25	GK	FRA	Benoît Costil (from Auxerre)

Out:

No.	Pos.	Nation	Player
1	GK	BRA	Léo Jardim (to (Brazil) Vasco da Gama)
13	DF	ALG	Akim Zedadka (on loan to Auxerre)
19	FW	FRA	Isaac Lihadji (to (England) Sunderland)

=== Brest ===
In:

No.	Pos.	Nation	Player
14	FW	FRA	Loïc Rémy (free agent)
17	FW	HON	Alberth Elis (on loan from Bordeaux)
27	DF	FRA	Kenny Lala (from (Greece) Olympiacos)
28	DF	FRA	Bradley Locko (on loan from Reims)
37	MF	FRA	Félix Lemaréchal (on loan from Monaco)

Out:

No.	Pos.	Nation	Player
11	FW	FRA	Axel Camblan (on loan to Concarneau)
13	FW	ALG	Islam Slimani (to (Belgium) Anderlecht)
14	FW	FRA	Irvin Cardona (to (Germany) FC Augsburg)
21	DF	FIN	Jere Uronen (on loan to (Germany) Schalke 04)
—	GK	FRA	Gautier Larsonneur (to Saint-Étienne, previously on loan at Valenciennes)

=== Reims ===
In:

No.	Pos.	Nation	Player
11	FW	FRA	Myziane Maolida (on loan from (Germany) Hertha BSC)
96	GK	FRA	Alexandre Olliero (from Pau)

Out:

No.	Pos.	Nation	Player
1	GK	AUT	Patrick Pentz (to (Germany) Bayer Leverkusen)
6	DF	GLP	Andreaw Gravillon (on loan to (Italy) Torino)
11	FW	FRA	Nathanaël Mbuku (to (Germany) FC Augsburg)
18	MF	FRA	Martin Adeline (on loan to Rodez)
28	DF	FRA	Bradley Locko (on loan to Brest)
41	DF	GUI	Ibrahim Diakité (on loan to (Belgium) Eupen)
99	MF	FRA	Rafik Guitane (on loan to (Portugal) Estoril)
—	FW	CIV	N'Dri Philippe Koffi (on loan to Le Mans, previously on loan at (Portugal) Paços de Ferreira)
—	FW	FRA	Timothé Nkada (to (Slovenia) Koper)

=== Montpellier ===
In:

No.	Pos.	Nation	Player
3	DF	GUI	Issiaga Sylla (from Toulouse)
4	DF	MLI	Boubakar Kouyaté (from Metz)
40	GK	FRA	Benjamin Lecomte (from Monaco, previously on loan at (Spain) Espanyol)

Out:

No.	Pos.	Nation	Player
1	GK	SUI	Jonas Omlin (to (Germany) Borussia Mönchengladbach)
2	DF	FRA	Arnaud Souquet (to (United States) Chicago Fire)
19	MF	FRA	Sacha Delaye (on loan to Le Puy)
31	DF	FRA	Nicolas Cozza (to (Germany) VfL Wolfsburg)

=== Angers ===
In:

No.	Pos.	Nation	Player
7	FW	SEN	Ibrahima Niane (on loan from Metz)
8	DF	ALG	Faouzi Ghoulam (free agent)

Out:

No.	Pos.	Nation	Player
7	MF	MAR	Sofiane Boufal (to (Qatar) Al-Rayyan)
8	MF	MAR	Azzedine Ounahi (to Marseille)
17	MF	FRA	Ibrahim Amadou (to (China) Shanghai Shenhua)
21	MF	FRA	Antonin Bobichon (to Laval)
44	FW	CRO	Marin Jakoliš (on loan to (Cyprus) AEK Larnaca)

=== Troyes ===
In:

No.	Pos.	Nation	Player
14	MF	FRA	Jeff Reine-Adélaïde (on loan from Lyon)
25	FW	FRA	Alexis Tibidi (from (Germany) VfB Stuttgart, previously on loan at (Austria) SCR Altach)

Out:

No.	Pos.	Nation	Player
5	MF	FRA	Tristan Dingomé (to (Saudi Arabia) Al Fateh)
14	FW	SWE	Amar Abdirahman Ahmed (on loan to (Belgium) Lommel)
21	FW	COL	Marlos Moreno (on loan to (Turkey) Konyaspor)
45	DF	FRA	Gabriel Mutombo (to (Romania) Botoșani)
—	FW	MAR	Nassim Chadli (to Le Havre, previously on loan at (Belgium) Lommel)

=== Lorient ===
In:

No.	Pos.	Nation	Player
11	FW	SEN	Bamba Dieng (from Marseille)
14	MF	FRA	Romain Faivre (on loan from Lyon)
17	MF	FRA	Jean-Victor Makengo (from (Italy) Udinese)
23	GK	GER	Julian Pollersbeck (on loan from Lyon)
44	MF	FRA	Ayman Kari (on loan from Paris Saint-Germain)
—	FW	NOR	Joel Mvuka (from (Norway) Bodø/Glimt)

Out:

No.	Pos.	Nation	Player
4	DF	FRA	Chrislain Matsima (loan return to Monaco)
11	FW	BFA	Dango Ouattara (to (England) Bournemouth)
13	FW	NGA	Terem Moffi (on loan to Nice)
17	MF	FRA	Quentin Boisgard (on loan to Pau)
20	DF	FRA	Samuel Loric (on loan to Quevilly-Rouen)
27	FW	AUT	Adrian Grbić (on loan to Valenciennes)
—	FW	NOR	Joel Mvuka (on loan to (Norway) Bodø/Glimt)
—	DF	GER	Moritz Jenz (on loan to (Germany) Schalke 04, previously on loan at (Scotland) Celtic)
—	FW	SEN	Sambou Soumano (on loan to Rodez, previously on loan at (Belgium) Eupen)
—	GK	FRA	Thomas Callens (to Annecy, previously on loan)

=== Clermont ===
In:

No.	Pos.	Nation	Player
—	MF	MAR	Abdellah Baallal (from (Morocco) Mohammed VI Football Academy)
—	FW	FRA	Adama Diakité (from Trélissac)
—	FW	CIV	Charly Keita (from Sedan)

Out:

No.	Pos.	Nation	Player
19	DF	SEN	Arial Mendy (to Grenoble)
20	FW	BEN	Jodel Dossou (to Sochaux)
23	MF	BEL	Brandon Baiye (to (Belgium) Eupen)
—	FW	FRA	Adama Diakité (on loan to (Switzerland) Biel-Bienne)
—	FW	CIV	Charly Keita (on loan to (Switzerland) Biel-Bienne)

=== Toulouse ===
In:

No.	Pos.	Nation	Player
13	MF	SUI	Vincent Sierro (from (Switzerland) Young Boys)
15	DF	CHI	Gabriel Suazo (from (Chile) Colo-Colo)
26	DF	NOR	Warren Kamanzi (from (Norway) Tromsø)
29	FW	BIH	Saïd Hamulic (from (Poland) Stal Mielec)

Out:

No.	Pos.	Nation	Player
11	FW	FRA	Yanis Begraoui (on loan to Pau)
12	DF	GUI	Issiaga Sylla (to Montpellier)
20	FW	JAM	Junior Flemmings (on loan to Chamois Niortais)
40	GK	SWE	Isak Pettersson (to (Norway) Stabæk)
—	MF	FIN	Naatan Skyttä (on loan to (Denmark) OB, previously on loan at (Norway) Viking)

=== Ajaccio ===
In:

No.	Pos.	Nation	Player
28	FW	SEN	Moussa Djitté (on loan from (United States) Austin)

Out:

No.	Pos.	Nation	Player
10	MF	ALB	Qazim Laçi (to (Czech Republic) Sparta Prague)
11	FW	CGO	Bevic Moussiti-Oko (to (Turkey) Ankaragücü)

=== Auxerre ===
In:

No.	Pos.	Nation	Player
1	GK	ROU	Ionuț Radu (on loan from (Italy) Inter Milan, previously on loan at (Italy) Cremonese)
13	DF	ALG	Akim Zedadka (on loan from Lille)
19	FW	FRA	Matthis Abline (on loan from Rennes)
42	MF	GHA	Elisha Owusu (from (Belgium) Gent)
77	FW	SCO	Siriki Dembélé (on loan from (England) Bournemouth)
80	MF	FRA	Han-Noah Massengo (on loan from (England) Bristol City)
95	DF	FRA	Isaak Touré (on loan from Marseille)

Out:

No.	Pos.	Nation	Player
3	DF	FRA	Quentin Bernard (to Chamois Niortais)
19	FW	FRA	Gaëtan Charbonnier (to Saint-Étienne)
20	DF	FRA	Alexandre Coeff (to (Italy) Brescia)
23	GK	FRA	Benoît Costil (to Lille)
26	DF	FRA	Paul Joly (on loan to Dijon)

== Ligue 2 ==
Note: Flags indicate national team as has been defined under FIFA eligibility rules. Players may hold more than one non-FIFA nationality.

=== Saint-Étienne ===
In:

No.	Pos.	Nation	Player
8	DF	FRA	Dennis Appiah (from Nantes)
10	FW	FRA	Gaëtan Charbonnier (from Auxerre)
20	MF	FRA	Kader Bamba (on loan from Nantes)
21	DF	CRO	Mateo Pavlović (on loan from (Croatia) Rijeka)
26	MF	FRA	Lamine Fomba (from Nîmes)
27	DF	FRA	Niels Nkounkou (on loan from (England) Everton, previously on loan at (England) Cardiff City)
30	GK	FRA	Gautier Larsonneur (from Brest, previously on loan at Valenciennes)

Out:

No.	Pos.	Nation	Player
9	FW	FRA	Charles Abi (to (Switzerland) Stade Lausanne Ouchy)
11	DF	BRA	Gabriel Silva (free agent)
13	DF	ESP	Sergi Palencia (to (United States) Los Angeles)
27	DF	FRA	Yvann Maçon (on loan to Paris FC)
36	DF	CIV	Abdoulaye Bakayoko (on loan to Le Puy)

=== Metz ===
In:

No.	Pos.	Nation	Player
11	FW	ALB	Xhuliano Skuka (from (Albania) Partizani)

Out:

No.	Pos.	Nation	Player
4	DF	MLI	Boubakar Kouyaté (to Montpellier)
7	FW	SEN	Ibrahima Niane (on loan to Angers)
11	FW	NED	Anthony Musaba (loan return to Monaco)
21	MF	MAR	Amine Bassi (to (United States) Houston Dynamo)
80	FW	SEN	Amadou Dia N'Diaye (to (Switzerland) Neuchâtel Xamax)

=== Bordeaux ===
In:

No.	Pos.	Nation	Player
80	MF	ROU	Alexi Pitu (from (Romania) Farul Constanța)

Out:

No.	Pos.	Nation	Player
29	FW	HON	Alberth Elis (on loan to Brest)
97	FW	FRA	Lucas Rocrou (on loan to Bourg-en-Bresse)

=== Paris FC ===
In:

No.	Pos.	Nation	Player
8	DF	FRA	Yvann Maçon (on loan from Saint-Étienne)
35	MF	CIV	Sékou Sanogo (on loan from (Serbia) Red Star Belgrade)

Out:

No.	Pos.	Nation	Player
3	DF	FRA	Jaouen Hadjam (to Nantes)
18	DF	SEN	Youssoupha N'Diaye (on loan to Stade Briochin)

=== Sochaux ===
In:

No.	Pos.	Nation	Player
8	MF	FRA	Damien Le Tallec (from (Russia) Torpedo Moscow)
24	FW	BEN	Jodel Dossou (from Clermont)

Out:

No.	Pos.	Nation	Player
3	DF	NGA	Valentine Ozornwafor (loan return to (Belgium) Charleroi)
8	MF	SEN	Joseph Lopy (to Nîmes)
95	MF	FRA	Younès Kaabouni (free agent)

=== Guingamp ===
In:

No.	Pos.	Nation	Player
22	DF	FRA	Loïc Mbe Soh (on loan from (England) Nottingham Forest)

Out:

No.	Pos.	Nation	Player
3	DF	FRA	Arthur Vitelli (on loan to (Poland) Podbeskidzie)
5	DF	FRA	Hady Camara (on loan to Annecy)
22	FW	ALG	Mehdi Baaloudj (on loan to Martigues)

=== Caen ===
In:

No.	Pos.	Nation	Player
13	FW	FRA	Moussa Sylla (from (Netherlands) Utrecht)
14	MF	SWE	Anton Salétros (from (Norway) Sarpsborg 08)

Out:

No.	Pos.	Nation	Player
22	DF	FRA	Brahim Traoré (on loan to (Belgium) Standard de Liège 16)
26	MF	COM	Iyad Mohamed (on loan to Le Mans)
—	FW	FRA	Andréas Hountondji (on loan to Orléans, previously on loan at Quevilly-Rouen)
—	FW	SWE	Zeidane Inoussa (on loan to (Spain) Valencia B, previously on loan at (Spain) Real Murcia)

=== Le Havre ===
In:

No.	Pos.	Nation	Player
3	FW	MAR	Nassim Chadli (from Troyes, previously on loan at (Belgium) Lommel)
5	MF	MAR	Oussama Targhalline (from Marseille, previously on loan at (Turkey) Alanyaspor)
29	FW	FRA	Samuel Grandsir (from (United States) LA Galaxy)
92	DF	FRA	Étienne Youte Kinkoue (from (Greece) Olympiacos B)

Out:

No.	Pos.	Nation	Player
21	FW	FRA	Ylan Gomes (on loan to Paris 13 Atletico)

=== Nîmes ===
In:

No.	Pos.	Nation	Player
7	FW	FRA	Lys Mousset (on loan from (Germany) VfL Bochum)
9	FW	GNB	Steve Ambri (from (Moldova) Sheriff Tiraspol)
22	MF	ALG	Mehdi Zerkane (free agent)
26	DF	FRA	Sanasi Sy (from (Italy) Salernitana)
28	MF	SEN	Joseph Lopy (from Sochaux)
97	MF	MTN	Guessouma Fofana (from (Romania) Cluj)

Out:

No.	Pos.	Nation	Player
5	DF	JPN	Naomichi Ueda (to (Japan) Kashima Antlers)
9	FW	ISL	Elías Már Ómarsson (to (Netherlands) NAC Breda)
12	MF	FRA	Lamine Fomba (to Saint-Étienne)
22	MF	MAR	Yassine Benrahou (to (Croatia) Hajduk Split)

=== Pau ===
In:

No.	Pos.	Nation	Player
1	GK	FRA	Jérôme Prior (from (Greece) PAS Giannina)
8	FW	FRA	Loïck Lespinasse (from (Spain) Real Sociedad B)
14	FW	FRA	Yanis Begraoui (on loan from Toulouse)
27	MF	FRA	Quentin Boisgard (on loan from Lorient)

Out:

No.	Pos.	Nation	Player
1	GK	FRA	Alexandre Olliero (to Reims)
8	FW	GNB	David Gomis (to (Azerbaijan) Sabail)
22	FW	FRA	Walid Jarmouni (on loan to Paris 13 Atletico)

=== Dijon ===
In:

No.	Pos.	Nation	Player
7	FW	FRA	Marley Aké (on loan from (Italy) Juventus)
26	DF	FRA	Paul Joly (on loan from Auxerre)

Out:

No.	Pos.	Nation	Player
7	MF	ROU	Alex Dobre (on loan to (Portugal) Famalicão)
88	MF	FRA	Lucas Deaux (to Nancy)
—	MF	KOS	Bersant Celina (on loan to (England) Stoke City, previously on loan at (Turkey) Kasımpaşa)
—	MF	ALG	Yassine Benzia (to (Azerbaijan) Qarabağ)
—	FW	SEN	Moussa Konaté (to (Georgia (country)) Dinamo Batumi)

=== Bastia ===
In:

No.	Pos.	Nation	Player
15	DF	LUX	Florian Bohnert (from (Luxembourg) Progrès Niederkorn)
39	FW	FRA	Kapit Djoco (from Versailles)

Out:

No.	Pos.	Nation	Player
14	MF	MAR	Amine Talal (to (Moldova) Sheriff Tiraspol)
78	MF	SEN	Mamadou Camara (loan return to Lens)

=== Chamois Niortais ===
In:

No.	Pos.	Nation	Player
2	DF	FRA	Quentin Bernard (from Auxerre)
77	FW	JAM	Junior Flemmings (on loan from Toulouse)

Out:

No.	Pos.	Nation	Player

=== Amiens ===
In:

No.	Pos.	Nation	Player
21	FW	FRA	Janis Antiste (on loan from (Italy) Sassuolo)

Out:

No.	Pos.	Nation	Player
9	FW	NGA	Tolu Arokodare (to (Belgium) Genk)
10	FW	BEN	Angel Chibozo (loan return to (Italy) Juventus)
21	MF	FRA	Jessy Bénet (to Grenoble)
31	FW	BEN	Charbel Gomez (to (Georgia (country)) Samgurali)
—	DF	FRA	Harouna Sy (to (Greece) Volos)
—	DF	CIV	Siriky Diabaté (on loan to Bastia-Borgo)
—	FW	SWE	Jack Lahne (on loan to (Norway) Start, previously on loan at (Hungary) Újpest)
—	FW	FRA	Darell Tokpa (to (Luxembourg) Differdange 03, previously on loan at Stade Briochin)

=== Grenoble ===
In:

No.	Pos.	Nation	Player
8	MF	FRA	Jessy Bénet (from Amiens)
77	DF	SEN	Arial Mendy (from Clermont)

Out:

No.	Pos.	Nation	Player
7	MF	GEO	Giorgi Kokhreidze (to (Georgia (country)) Saburtalo)
10	MF	FRA	Florian Michel (to Bourgoin-Jallieu)
20	DF	AUS	Alex Gersbach (to (United States) Colorado Rapids)
25	MF	KOS	Orges Bunjaku (on loan to (Switzerland) Schaffhausen)
27	FW	FRA	Olivier Boissy (on loan to Saint-Pryvé Saint-Hilaire)

=== Valenciennes ===
In:

No.	Pos.	Nation	Player
1	GK	FRA	Stefan Bajic (on loan from (England) Bristol City)
29	FW	FRA	Salim Ben Seghir (on loan from Marseille)
77	FW	AUT	Adrian Grbić (on loan from Lorient)

Out:

No.	Pos.	Nation	Player
1	GK	FRA	Gautier Larsonneur (loan return to Brest)
31	DF	FRA	Aloïs Penin (on loan to (Belgium) Olympic Charleroi)

=== Rodez ===
In:

No.	Pos.	Nation	Player
10	MF	FRA	Martin Adeline (on loan from Reims)
29	DF	FRA	Louis Torres (on loan from (Belgium) Cercle Brugge)
35	FW	SEN	Sambou Soumano (on loan from Lorient, previously on loan at (Belgium) Eupen)

Out:

No.	Pos.	Nation	Player
7	MF	FRA	Nassim Ouammou (to (Israel) Maccabi Netanya)
10	FW	GLP	Florian David (to (Lithuania) Kauno Žalgiris)
17	MF	ANG	Plamedi Buni Jorge (to Créteil)
27	FW	FRA	Hatim Far (on loan to Paris 13 Atletico)
29	DF	FRA	Grégory Coelho (on loan to Bastia-Borgo)

=== Quevilly-Rouen ===
In:

No.	Pos.	Nation	Player
22	DF	FRA	Samuel Loric (on loan from Lorient)

Out:

No.	Pos.	Nation	Player
11	FW	FRA	Andréas Hountondji (loan return to Caen)
27	DF	FRA	Damon Bansais (on loan to Bourg-en-Bresse)

=== Laval ===
In:

No.	Pos.	Nation	Player
14	FW	FRA	Simon Elisor (on loan from (Belgium) Seraing)
28	MF	FRA	Antonin Bobichon (from Angers)

Out:

No.	Pos.	Nation	Player
26	DF	ALG	Hamza Mouali (loan return to (Algeria) Paradou)

=== Annecy ===
In:

No.	Pos.	Nation	Player
16	GK	FRA	Thomas Callens (from Lorient, previously on loan)
19	FW	FRA	Samuel Ntamack (from SO Romorantin)
21	DF	FRA	Hady Camara (on loan from Guingamp)

Out:

No.	Pos.	Nation	Player
2	DF	FRA	Matthieu Sans (retired)
19	MF	FRA	Alexandre Fillon (to Le Puy)

== See also ==
- 2022–23 Ligue 1
- 2022–23 Ligue 2
