= 2021–22 Stade Brestois 29 season =

Stade Brestois 29
2021–22 season
- President: Denis Le Saint
- Head coach: Michel Der Zakarian
- Stadium: Stade Francis-Le Blé
- Ligue 1: 11th
- Coupe de France: Round of 16
- Top goalscorer: League: Franck Honorat (11); All: Franck Honorat (11)
Home colours	Away colours	Third colours

The 2021–22 season was the 72nd season in the existence of Stade Brestois 29 and the club's third consecutive season in the top flight of French football. In addition to the domestic league, Brest participated in this season's edition of the Coupe de France.

== Players ==
=== First-team squad ===
As of 1 February 2022.

Note: Flags indicate national team as defined under FIFA eligibility rules; some limited exceptions apply. Players may hold more than one non-FIFA nationality.

No.	Pos.	Nation	Player
1	GK	FRA	Gautier Larsonneur
2	DF	FRA	Jean-Kévin Duverne
3	DF	FRA	Lilian Brassier
5	DF	FRA	Brendan Chardonnet (vice-captain)
7	MF	ALG	Haris Belkebla
8	MF	FRA	Paul Lasne
9	FW	FRA	Franck Honorat
10	MF	FRA	Lucien Agoumé (on loan from Inter)
11	FW	URU	Martín Satriano (on loan from Inter)
14	FW	FRA	Irvin Cardona
15	FW	BEN	Steve Mounié (captain)
16	GK	FRA	Sébastien Cibois
17	DF	FRA	Dénys Bain

No.	Pos.	Nation	Player
18	DF	FRA	Ronaël Pierre-Gabriel (on loan from Mainz 05)
19	FW	COM	Rafiki Saïd
20	DF	FIN	Jere Uronen
22	DF	FRA	Julien Faussurier
23	DF	FRA	Christophe Hérelle
24	FW	ALG	Youcef Belaïli
25	FW	FRA	Romain Del Castillo
26	FW	FRA	Jérémy Le Douaron
27	MF	FRA	Hugo Magnetti
28	MF	FRA	Hiang'a Mbock
30	GK	FRA	Grégoire Coudert
33	DF	FRA	Noé Sow
40	GK	NED	Marco Bizot

=== Out on loan ===
Note: Flags indicate national team as defined under FIFA eligibility rules; some limited exceptions apply. Players may hold more than one non-FIFA nationality.

No.	Pos.	Nation	Player
—	FW	FRA	Romain Philippoteaux (at Dijon)

== Pre-season and friendlies ==
Win Draw Loss Fixtures

10 July 2021 Friendly	Guingamp (France)	2–2	(France) Brest	Paimpol, France
16:00 CEST (UTC+2)				Stadium: Stade Charles Boursier

17 July 2021 Friendly	Brest (France)	2–3	(France) Lorient	Ploemeur, France
17:30 CEST (UTC+2)				Stadium: Complexe Sportif Espace FCL

21 July 2021 Friendly	Brest (France)	1–2	(France) Stade Briochin	Landivisiau, France
19:00 CEST (UTC+2)	Mounié 65'	Report	Remars 36'; Papin 85'	Stadium: Stade Jean Bleas

24 July 2021 Friendly	Brest (France)	1–3	(France) Nantes	Brest, France
11:00 CEST (UTC+2)	Mounié 17'	Report	Emond 5', 61'; Pereira de Sa 25'	Stadium: Stade Francis-Le Blé

28 July 2021 Friendly	Stade Plabennec (France)	2–4	(France) Brest	Plabennec, France
19:00 CEST (UTC+2)	Mourdi 17'; Pellen 28' (pen.)	Report	Minier 6' (o.g.); Chardonnet 9'; Uronen (red card) 14'; Cardona 32'; Mounié 66'	Stadium: Stade de Kervéguen

1 August 2021 Friendly	Brest (France)	1–2	(Spain) Mallorca	Brest, France
18:30 CEST (UTC+2)	Faivre 63'	Report	Sevilla 11' (pen.); Mollejo 71'	Stadium: Stade Francis-Le Blé

3 September 2021 Friendly	Brest (France)	2–4	(France) Guingamp	Brest, France
15:00 CEST (UTC+2)	Faussurier 61'; Faivre 86' (pen.)		Livolant 44'; Pierrot 45' (pen.); Gomis 83'; Carnot 90'	Stadium: Stade Francis-Le Blé

== Competitions ==
=== Overall record ===
Competition	First match	Last match	Starting round	Final position	Record							
Competition	First match	Last match	Starting round	Final position	Pld	W	D	L	GF	GA	GD	Win %
Ligue 1	7 August 2021	21 May 2022	Matchday 1	11th	38	13	9	16	49	57	−8	34.21
Coupe de France	19 December 2021	28 January 2022	Round of 64	Round of 16	3	1	1	1	3	2	+1	33.33
Total					41	14	10	17	52	59	−7	34.15

Source: Soccerway

=== Ligue 1 ===
==== League table ====
Pos	Team	Pld	W	D	L	GF	GA	GD	Pts	Qualification or relegation
9	Nantes	38	15	10	13	55	48	+7	55	Qualification for the Europa League group stage (Note: Nantes qualified for the Europa League group stage as the 2021–22 Coupe de France winners.)
10	Lille	38	14	13	11	48	48	0	55	
11	Brest	38	13	9	16	49	57	−8	48	
12	Reims	38	11	13	14	43	44	−1	46	
13	Montpellier	38	12	7	19	49	61	−12	43	

Source: Ligue 1
Rules for classification: 1) Points; 2) Goal difference; 3) Head-to-head points; 4) Head-to-head goal difference; 5) Head-to-head goals scored; 6) Head-to-head away goals scored; 7) Goals scored; 8) Away goals scored; 9) Fair-play points (Note: Head-to-head record is used only after all the matches between the teams in question have been played).

==== Results summary ====
Overall								Home						Away					
Pld	W	D	L	GF	GA	GD	Pts	W	D	L	GF	GA	GD	W	D	L	GF	GA	GD
38	13	9	16	49	57	−8	48	7	4	8	28	29	−1	6	5	8	21	28	−7

Source: Ligue 1

==== Results by round ====
Round	1	2	3	4	5	6	7	8	9	10	11	12	13	14	15	16	17	18	19	20	21	22	23	24	25	26	27	28	29	30	31	32	33	34	35	36	37	38
Ground	A	H	H	A	H	A	A	H	A	H	A	H	A	H	A	H	A	H	A	H	A	H	A	H	A	H	A	H	A	A	H	A	H	A	H	H	A	H
Result	D	D	L	L	D	D	L	L	L	D	D	W	W	W	W	W	W	L	D	L	L	W	L	W	D	L	W	L	L	W	D	L	W	W	W	L	L	L
Position	7	11	14	18	17	18	18	19	19	19	18	18	17	13	12	11	10	12	12	13	13	13	13	12	12	12	12	13	13	12	12	12	12	11	11	11	11	11

Source: Ligue 1
A = Away; H = Home; W = Win; D = Draw; L = Loss

==== Matches ====
The league fixtures were announced on 25 June 2021.

7 August 2021 1	Lyon	1–1	Brest	Décines-Charpieu
17:00 CEST (UTC+2)	Slimani 62', (yellow card) 90+3'	Report	Cardona 43'; Magnetti (yellow card) 67'	Stadium: Parc Olympique Lyonnais; Attendance: 0 Referee: Mikael Lesage

15 August 2021 2	Brest	1–1	Rennes	Brest
15:00 CEST (UTC+2)	Honorat (yellow card) 39'; Brassier (yellow card) 44'; Le Douaron 90+1'	Report	Bourigeaud (yellow card) 44'; Ugochukwu (yellow card) 79'; Guirassy 84'; Traoré (yellow card) 88'	Stadium: Stade Francis-Le Blé; Attendance: 14,271; Referee: Benoît Bastien

20 August 2021 3	Brest	2–4	Paris Saint-Germain	Brest
21:00 CEST (UTC+2)	Honorat 42'; Brassier (yellow card) 52'; Mounié 85'	Report	Herrera 23'; Mbappé 36', (yellow card) 65'; Verratti (yellow card) 54'; Gueye 73'; Di María 90'	Stadium: Stade Francis-Le Blé; Attendance: 14,586; Referee: Eric Wattellier

29 August 2021 4	Strasbourg	3–1	Brest	Strasbourg
15:00 CEST (UTC+2)	Prcić 24'; Duverne 42' (o.g.); Fila (yellow card) 55'; Thomasson 84'	Report	Cardona 26'; Pierre-Gabriel (yellow card) 86'	Stadium: Stade de la Meinau; Attendance: 22,341; Referee: Romain Lissorgue

12 September 2021 5	Brest	1–1	Angers	Brest
15:00 CEST (UTC+2)	Pierre-Gabriel (yellow card) 27'; Honorat (yellow card) 45+1'; Faivre 62' (pen.)	Report	Doumbia (yellow card) 24'; Mangani 78' (pen.); Cabot (yellow card) 87'	Stadium: Stade Francis-Le Blé; Attendance: 10,982; Referee: Jérémy Stinat

19 September 2021 6	Clermont	1–1	Brest	Clermont-Ferrand
15:00 CEST (UTC+2)	Rashani (yellow card) 19', (goal) 65'; Gastien (red card) 50'	Report	Agoumé (yellow card) 32'; Chardonnet 52'	Stadium: Stade Gabriel Montpied; Attendance: 11,224; Referee: Bastien Dechepy

22 September 2021 7	Nantes	3–1	Brest	Nantes
19:00 CEST (UTC+2)	Blas 27'; Castelletto (yellow card) 31'; Chirivella 55'; Brassier 58' (o.g.)	Report	Chardonnet (yellow card) 52'; Le Douaron 67'; Brassier (yellow card) 85'	Stadium: Stade de la Beaujoire; Attendance: 19,676; Referee: Thomas Léonard

26 September 2021 8	Brest	1–2	Metz	Brest
15:00 CEST (UTC+2)	Pierre-Gabriel (yellow card) 46'; Faivre 68' (pen.); Mbock (yellow card) 71'; Chardonnet (yellow card) 88'	Report	De Préville 26'; Kouyaté (yellow card) 40'; Centonze 74', (yellow card) 82'	Stadium: Stade Francis-Le Blé; Attendance: 10,398; Referee: Willy Delajod

2 October 2021 9	Nice	2–1	Brest	Nice
21:00 CEST (UTC+2)	Todibo 45'; Bard 61'; Rosario (yellow card) 72'	Report	Honorat 90+2'; Mbock (yellow card) 90+5'	Stadium: Allianz Riviera; Attendance: 13,503; Referee: António Nobre

17 October 2021 10	Brest	1–1	Reims	Brest
15:00 CEST (UTC+2)	Mbock (yellow card) 11'; Faivre (yellow card) 32'; Honorat 74'; Larsonneur (yellow card) 90+1'	Report	Faes 12'; Touré (yellow card) 26'; Gravillon (yellow card) 61'; Koffi (yellow card) 66'; Van Bergen (yellow card) 90'	Stadium: Stade Francis-Le Blé; Attendance: 9,693; Referee: Jérémy Stinat

23 October 2021 11	Lille	1–1	Brest	Villeneuve-d'Ascq
21:00 CEST (UTC+2)	David 19'; Mandava (yellow card) 31'	Report	Faivre 32'; Hérelle (yellow card) 70'; Bizot (yellow card) 90+1'	Stadium: Stade Pierre-Mauroy; Attendance: 36,613; Referee: Clément Turpin

31 October 2021 12	Brest	2–0	Monaco	Brest
17:00 CET (UTC+1)	Mounié 18'; Magnetti (yellow card) 53'; Honorat 79'	Report	Caio (yellow card) 17'; Diop (yellow card) 42'; Ben Yedder (yellow card) 81'; Volland (yellow card) 83'	Stadium: Stade Francis-Le Blé; Attendance: 12,463; Referee: Johan Hamel

7 November 2021 13	Lorient	1–2	Brest	Lorient
15:00 CET (UTC+1)	Grbić 5'; Hergault (red card) 28'	Report	Honorat (yellow card) 44'; Faivre 58' (pen.); Mounié 80'	Stadium: Stade du Moustoir; Attendance: 14,649; Referee: Romain Lissorgue

21 November 2021 14	Brest	4–0	Lens	Brest
13:00 CET (UTC+1)	Mounié 3'; Chardonnet 13'; Faivre 33'; Duverne (yellow card) 58'; Le Douaron 69'	Report	Medina (yellow card) 36'; Kalimuendo (red card) 74'; Doucouré (yellow card) 76'	Stadium: Stade Francis-Le Blé; Attendance: 12,462; Referee: Eric Wattellier

28 November 2021 15	Bordeaux	1–2	Brest	Bordeaux
15:00 CET (UTC+1)	Gregersen 43'; Pembélé (yellow card) 75'; Mexer (yellow card) 80'; Niang (yellow card) 86'	Report	Chardonnet (yellow card) 50'; Le Douaron 60', 66'	Stadium: Matmut Atlantique; Attendance: 15,280; Referee: Pierre Gaillouste

1 December 2021 16	Brest	1–0	Saint-Étienne	Brest
19:00 CET (UTC+1)	Pierre-Gabriel (yellow card) 61'; Faivre 64' (pen.); Agoumé (yellow card) 67'	Report	Gourna-Douath (yellow card) 58'; Trauco (yellow card) 64'; Nordin (yellow card) 86'	Stadium: Stade Francis-Le Blé; Attendance: 13,248; Referee: Mikael Lesage

4 December 2021 17	Marseille	1–2	Brest	Marseille
17:00 CET (UTC+1)	Gerson 28'; Kamara (yellow card) 61'	Report	Faivre 53' (pen.); Honorat 70'; Pierre-Gabriel (yellow card) 90+2'; Cardona (yellow card) 90+3'	Stadium: Stade Vélodrome; Attendance: 54,413; Referee: Antony Gautier

11 December 2021 18	Brest	0–4	Montpellier	Brest
17:00 CET (UTC+1)	Hérelle (yellow card) 62'; Magnetti (yellow card) 84'	Report	Wahi 45+1'; Mavididi 47'; Sambia 60'; Germain 85'	Stadium: Stade Francis-Le Blé; Attendance: 11,332; Referee: Benoît Millot

22 December 2021 19	Troyes	1–1	Brest	Troyes
21:00 CET (UTC+1)	Kaboré (yellow card) 13'; Moulin (yellow card) 13' (yellow-red card) 13'; Rami 80'	Report	Honorat 5'; Hérelle (yellow card) 22'; Mounié (yellow card) 54'	Stadium: Stade de l'Aube; Attendance: 6,872; Referee: Johan Hamel

9 January 2022 20	Brest	0–3	Nice	Brest
13:00 CET (UTC+1)		Report	Dolberg 13'; Schneiderlin (red card) 20'; Kluivert (yellow card) 25'; Benítez (yellow card) 55'; Todibo (yellow card) 65'; Delort 79'; Gouiri 90+4'	Stadium: Stade Francis-Le Blé; Attendance: 5,102; Referee: Stéphanie Frappart

15 January 2022 21	Paris Saint-Germain	2–0	Brest	Paris
21:00 CET (UTC+1)	Herrera (yellow card) 24'; Mbappé 32', (yellow card) 34'; Kehrer 53'; Kimpembe (yellow card) 55'; Verratti (yellow card) 58'; Pereira (yellow card) 65'	Report	Magnetti (yellow card) 34'; Agoumé (yellow card) 45+1'; Chardonnet (yellow card) 61'	Stadium: Parc des Princes; Attendance: 4,925; Referee: Mikael Lesage

22 January 2022 22	Brest	2–0	Lille	Brest
17:00 CET (UTC+1)	Djaló 3' (o.g.); Mounié (yellow card) 11', (goal) 90+4' (pen.); Agoumé (yellow card) 27'	Report	Yılmaz (yellow card) 54'; Mandava (yellow card) 57'; Sanches (yellow card) 58'	Stadium: Stade Francis-Le Blé; Attendance: 4,358; Referee: Jérôme Brisard

6 February 2022 23	Rennes	2–0	Brest	Rennes
17:00 CET (UTC+1)	Martin (yellow card) 1'; Laborde 20'; Santamaria (yellow card) 31'; Terrier (yellow card) 59', (goal) 90'	Report	Del Castillo (yellow card) 52'	Stadium: Roazhon Park; Attendance: 25,409; Referee: Johan Hamel

13 February 2022 24	Brest	5–1	Troyes	Brest
15:00 CET (UTC+1)	Satriano 7', 27'; Agoumé (yellow card) 15'; Honorat 49', 67'; Mounié 82'	Report	Tardieu (yellow card) 43'; Rami 45'	Stadium: Stade Francis-Le Blé; Attendance: 10,600; Referee: Florent Batta

20 February 2022 25	Reims	1–1	Brest	Reims
15:00 CET (UTC+1)	Faes 4'; Mbuku (yellow card) 65'	Report	Satriano 34'; Belaïli (penalty missed) 53', (yellow card) 57'; Lasne (yellow card) 87'	Stadium: Stade Auguste-Delaune; Attendance: 9,307; Referee: Hakim Ben El Hadj

27 February 2022 26	Brest	0–1	Lorient	Brest
15:00 CET (UTC+1)	Chardonnet (red card) 29'; Satriano (yellow card) 45+4'; Agoumé (yellow card) 81'	Report	Innocent (yellow card) 43'; Laurienté (yellow card) 45'; Mendes (yellow card) 45+4'; Abergel (yellow card) 65'; Koné 73'	Stadium: Stade Francis-Le Blé; Attendance: 14,050; Referee: Benoît Bastien

5 March 2022 27	Lens	0–1	Brest	Lens
17:00 CET (UTC+1)	Medina (yellow card) 67'	Report	Belkebla (yellow card) 54'; Honorat 59'	Stadium: Stade Bollaert-Delelis; Attendance: 36,305; Referee: Johan Hamel

13 March 2022 28	Brest	1–4	Marseille	Brest
20:45 CET (UTC+1)	Satriano (yellow card) 35'; Cardona 90+1'	Report	Gerson 3'; Guendouzi (yellow card) 33'; Milik 63'; Harit 71'; Saliba (yellow card) 77'; Gueye (yellow card) 89'; Peres (yellow card) 90'; Ünder 90+1'	Stadium: Stade Francis-Le Blé; Attendance: 14,611; Referee: Ruddy Buquet

20 March 2022 29	Angers	1–0	Brest	Angers
15:00 CET (UTC+1)	Boufal (yellow card) 9', (goal) 39' (pen.); Thomas (yellow card) 28'	Report	Cardona (yellow card) 43'	Stadium: Stade Raymond Kopa; Attendance: 7,734; Referee: Jérémie Pignard

3 April 2022 30	Montpellier	1–2	Brest	Montpellier
15:00 CEST (UTC+2)	Mavididi (yellow card) 32'; Sakho (yellow card) 33'; Savanier 90+4' (pen.)	Report	Satriano (yellow card) 7', (goal) 69'; Hérelle (yellow card) 31'; Chardonnet (yellow card) 66'; Honorat 79'; Brassier (yellow card) 90+1'	Stadium: Stade de la Mosson; Attendance: 10,929; Referee: Florent Batta

10 April 2022 31	Brest	1–1	Nantes	Brest
15:00 CEST (UTC+2)	Hérelle (yellow card) 64'; Chardonnet 67'	Report	Kolo Muani 10'; Chirivella (yellow card) 43'; Castelletto (yellow card) 70'; Fábio (yellow card) 90+4'	Stadium: Stade Francis-Le Blé; Attendance: 13,145; Referee: Johan Hamel

16 April 2022 32	Saint-Étienne	2–1	Brest	Saint-Étienne
17:00 CEST (UTC+2)	Camara 14', 39'	Report	Honorat 8'; Pierre-Gabriel (yellow card) 74'; Belkebla (yellow card) 90+5'	Stadium: Stade Geoffroy-Guichard; Attendance: 27,227; Referee: Eric Wattellier

20 April 2022 33	Brest	2–1	Lyon	Brest
21:00 CEST (UTC+2)	Mounié 27' (pen.); Faussurier (yellow card) 30'; Satriano (yellow card) 58'; Cardona 74'	Report	Tete (yellow card) 18'; Mendes (yellow card) 55'; Dembélé 72'	Stadium: Stade Francis-Le Blé; Attendance: 14,028; Referee: Jérémy Stinat

24 April 2022 34	Metz	0–1	Brest	Metz
15:00 CEST (UTC+2)	N'Doram (yellow card) 14'; Jemerson (yellow card) 35', (red card) 78'; Kouyaté (yellow card) 37'; Delaine (yellow card) 74'; Oukidja (red card) 80'	Report	Belaïli 27'	Stadium: Stade Saint-Symphorien; Attendance: 19,874; Referee: Florent Batta

1 May 2022 35	Brest	2–0	Clermont	Brest
15:00 CEST (UTC+2)	Del Castillo (red card) 22'; Belaïli (yellow card) 30'; Brassier 60'; Mounié 62'; Saïd (yellow card) 90+1'	Report	Ogier (yellow card) 28'; N'Simba (yellow card) 45+1'	Stadium: Stade Francis-Le Blé; Attendance: 10,592; Referee: Romain Lissorgue

7 May 2022 36	Brest	0–1	Strasbourg	Brest
17:00 CEST (UTC+2)	Satriano (yellow card) 83'	Report	Gameiro 72'; Nyamsi (yellow card) 83'; Liénard (yellow card) 84'	Stadium: Stade Francis-Le Blé; Attendance: 12,094; Referee: Mikael Lesage

14 May 2022 37	Monaco	4–2	Brest	Monaco
21:00 CEST (UTC+2)	Ben Yedder 44' (pen.), 51', 54'; Golovin (yellow card) 45+3'; Volland (yellow card) 62', (goal) 70'	Report	Duverne 10'; Belaïli 23'; Hérelle (yellow card) 45+3'	Stadium: Stade Louis II; Attendance: 5,852; Referee: Jérôme Brisard

21 May 2022 38	Brest	2–4	Bordeaux	Brest
21:00 CEST (UTC+2)	Mounié 16'; Chardonnet (yellow card) 30'; Belaïli 34'	Report	Mangas 14'; Mara 32', 73'; Dilrosun 75'	Stadium: Stade Francis-Le Blé; Attendance: 14,484; Referee: Hakim Ben El Hadj

=== Coupe de France ===
19 December 2021 Round of 64	Dinan-Léhon FC	0–0 (12–13 p)	Brest	Saint-Brieuc
18:20 CET (UTC+1)	Touré (red card) 32'; Hervé (yellow card) 41'	Report	Mbock (yellow card) 5'; Lasne (yellow card) 84'	Stadium: Stade Fred-Aubert; Referee: Benjamin Lepaysant

2 January 2022 Round of 32	Brest	3–0	Bordeaux	Brest
13:45 CET (UTC+1)	Duverne (yellow card) 28'; Mounié 36' (pen.); Faivre 81' (pen.); Le Douaron 90+4'	Report		Stadium: Stade Francis-Le Blé; Attendance: 4,039; Referee: Ruddy Buquet

28 January 2022 Round of 16	Nantes	2–0	Brest	Nantes
21:00 CET (UTC+1)	Blas 25', 53'	Report	Brassier (yellow card) 33'; Hérelle (yellow card) 51'; Chardonnet (yellow card) 72'	Stadium: Stade de la Beaujoire; Attendance: 5,000; Referee: Benoît Bastien

== Statistics ==
=== Appearances and goals ===
Last updated 21 May 2022.

No.	Pos	Nat	Player	Total		Ligue 1		Coupe de France	
No.	Pos	Nat	Player	Apps	Goals	Apps	Goals	Apps	Goals
Goalkeepers
1	GK	(France) FRA	Gautier Larsonneur	3	0	0	0	3+0	0
16	GK	(France) FRA	Sébastien Cibois	0	0	0	0	0	0
30	GK	(France) FRA	Grégoire Coudert	0	0	0	0	0	0
40	GK	(Netherlands) NED	Marco Bizot	38	0	38+0	0	0	0
Defenders
2	DF	(France) FRA	Jean-Kévin Duverne	40	1	33+4	1	3+0	0
3	DF	(France) FRA	Lilian Brassier	34	1	23+8	1	3+0	0
5	DF	(France) FRA	Brendan Chardonnet	35	3	31+1	3	3+0	0
17	DF	(France) FRA	Dénys Bain	2	0	2+0	0	0	0
18	DF	(France) FRA	Ronaël Pierre-Gabriel	31	0	29+1	0	1+0	0
20	DF	(Finland) FIN	Jere Uronen	16	0	10+4	0	1+1	0
22	DF	(France) FRA	Julien Faussurier	17	0	4+12	0	0+1	0
23	DF	(France) FRA	Christophe Hérelle	24	0	23+0	0	1+0	0
33	DF	(France) FRA	Noé Sow	0	0	0	0	0	0
Midfielders
7	MF	(Algeria) ALG	Haris Belkebla	32	0	26+5	0	1+0	0
8	MF	(France) FRA	Paul Lasne	17	0	9+6	0	1+1	0
10	MF	(France) FRA	Lucien Agoumé	30	0	21+6	0	2+1	0
21	MF	(France) FRA	Romain Faivre (transferred out)	22	8	20+1	7	1+0	1
27	MF	(France) FRA	Hugo Magnetti	29	0	16+12	0	1+0	0
28	MF	(France) FRA	Hiang'a Mbock	17	0	9+5	0	1+2	0
Forwards
9	FW	(France) FRA	Franck Honorat	37	11	34+0	11	2+1	0
11	FW	(France) FRA	Romain Philippoteaux (out on loan)	1	0	0+1	0	0	0
11	FW	(Uruguay) URU	Martín Satriano	16	4	11+4	4	1+0	0
14	FW	(France) FRA	Irvin Cardona	35	4	13+19	4	3+0	0
15	FW	(Benin) BEN	Steve Mounié	38	10	25+10	9	2+1	1
19	FW	(Comoros) COM	Rafiki Saïd	17	0	0+14	0	1+2	0
24	FW	(Algeria) ALG	Youcef Belaïli	13	3	11+2	3	0	0
25	FW	(France) FRA	Romain Del Castillo	22	0	13+9	0	0	0
26	FW	(France) FRA	Jérémy Le Douaron	35	6	16+16	5	1+2	1
29	FW	(Senegal) SEN	Youssouph Badji (loan terminated)	11	0	1+8	0	1+1	0
33	FW	(France) FRA	Axel Camblan	0	0	0	0	0	0

=== Top scorers ===
Includes all competitive matches. The list is sorted by squad number when total goals are equal.

Last updated 21 May 2022.

Rank	Position	Nationality	No.	Player	Ligue 1	Coupe de France	Total
1	FW	(France)	9	Franck Honorat	11	0	11
2	FW	(Benin)	15	Steve Mounié	9	1	10
3	MF	(France)	21	Romain Faivre	7	1	8
4	FW	(France)	26	Jérémy Le Douaron	5	1	6
5	FW	(Uruguay)	11	Martín Satriano	4	0	4
5	FW	(France)	14	Irvin Cardona	4	0	4
7	DF	(France)	5	Brendan Chardonnet	3	0	3
7	FW	(Algeria)	24	Youcef Belaïli	3	0	3
9	DF	(France)	2	Jean-Kévin Duverne	1	0	1
9	DF	(France)	3	Lilian Brassier	1	0	1
	Own goals				1	0	1
	TOTALS				49	3	52

=== Cleansheets ===
Includes all competitive matches. The list is sorted by squad number when total cleansheets are equal.

Last updated 21 May 2022.

Rank	Position	Nationality	No.	Player	Ligue 1	Coupe de France	Total
1
1	GK	(Netherlands)	40	Marco Bizot	7	0	7
2
2	GK	(France)	1	Gautier Larsonneur	0	2	2
TOTALS					7	2	9

=== Disciplinary record ===
Includes all competitive matches.

Last updated 21 May 2022.

Position	Nationality	Number	Name	Ligue 1			Coupe de France			Total		
Position	Nationality	Number	Name	Yellow card	(yellow card) (yellow-red card)	Red card	Yellow card	(yellow card) (yellow-red card)	Red card	Yellow card	(yellow card) (yellow-red card)	Red card
FW	(France)	25	Romain Del Castillo	1	0	1	0	0	0	1	0	1
DF	(France)	5	Brendan Chardonnet	6	0	0	1	0	0	7	0	0
DF	(France)	23	Christophe Hérelle	6	0	0	1	0	0	7	0	0
MF	(France)	10	Lucien Agoumé	6	0	0	0	0	0	6	0	0
DF	(France)	18	Ronaël Pierre-Gabriel	6	0	0	0	0	0	6	0	0
DF	(France)	3	Lilian Brassier	4	0	0	1	0	0	5	0	0
FW	(Uruguay)	11	Martín Satriano	5	0	0	0	0	0	5	0	0
MF	(France)	27	Hugo Magnetti	4	0	0	0	0	0	4	0	0
MF	(France)	28	Hiang'a Mbock	3	0	0	1	0	0	4	0	0
FW	(France)	9	Franck Honorat	3	0	0	0	0	0	3	0	0
DF	(France)	2	Jean-Kévin Duverne	1	0	0	1	0	0	2	0	0
MF	(Algeria)	7	Haris Belkebla	2	0	0	0	0	0	2	0	0
MF	(France)	8	Paul Lasne	1	0	0	1	0	0	2	0	0
FW	(France)	14	Irvin Cardona	2	0	0	0	0	0	2	0	0
FW	(Algeria)	24	Youcef Belaïli	2	0	0	0	0	0	2	0	0
GK	(France)	1	Gautier Larsonneur	1	0	0	0	0	0	1	0	0
FW	(Benin)	15	Steve Mounié	1	0	0	0	0	0	1	0	0
FW	(Comoros)	19	Rafiki Saïd	1	0	0	0	0	0	1	0	0
MF	(France)	21	Romain Faivre	1	0	0	0	0	0	1	0	0
DF	(France)	22	Julien Faussurier	1	0	0	0	0	0	1	0	0
GK	(Netherlands)	40	Marco Bizot	1	0	0	0	0	0	1	0	0
			TOTALS	58	0	1	6	0	0	64	0	1
