= 2019–20 Stade Brestois 29 season =

Football season

Stade Brestois 29
2019–20 season
- President: Denis Le Saint
- Head coach: Olivier Dall'Oglio
- Stadium: Stade Francis-Le Blé
- Ligue 1: 14th
- Coupe de France: Round of 64
- Coupe de la Ligue: Quarter-finals
- Top goalscorer: League: Irvin Cardona (6); All: Irvin Cardona (7)
- Highest home attendance: 15,144 (vs Paris Saint-Germain, 9 November 2019)
- Lowest home attendance: 12,437 (vs Strasbourg, 3 December 2019)
- Average home league attendance: 13,838
- Biggest win: Brest 5–0 Strasbourg
- Biggest defeat: Montpellier 4–0 Brest
Home colours	Away colours	Third colours

The 2019–20 season was Stade Brestois 29's 70th season in existence and the club's first season back in the top flight of French football. In addition to the domestic league, Brest participated in this season's editions of the Coupe de France and the Coupe de la Ligue. The season covered the period from 1 July 2019 to 30 June 2020.

== Players ==
=== First-team squad ===
As of 14 January 2020.

Note: Flags indicate national team as defined under FIFA eligibility rules; some limited exceptions apply. Players may hold more than one non-FIFA nationality.

No.	Pos.	Nation	Player
1	GK	FRA	Gautier Larsonneur
2	DF	FRA	Jean-Kévin Duverne
5	DF	FRA	Brendan Chardonnet
6	MF	FRA	Ibrahima Diallo
7	MF	ALG	Haris Belkebla
8	MF	FRA	Yoann Court
9	FW	FRA	Kévin Mayi
10	FW	FRA	Gaëtan Charbonnier
11	MF	ITA	Christian Battocchio
12	DF	BEN	David Kiki
13	MF	FRA	Paul Lasne
14	FW	FRA	Irvin Cardona
15	FW	FRA	Alexandre Mendy (on loan from Bordeaux)

No.	Pos.	Nation	Player
16	GK	GUF	Donovan Léon
17	DF	FRA	Dénys Bain
18	DF	FRA	Romain Perraud
19	MF	FRA	Ferris N'Goma
20	DF	FRA	Gaëtan Belaud (captain)
21	DF	CMR	Jean-Charles Castelletto
22	MF	FRA	Julien Faussurier
23	MF	FRA	Mathias Autret (vice-captain)
24	DF	GUF	Ludovic Baal
25	FW	FRA	Samuel Grandsir (on loan from Monaco)
27	MF	FRA	Hugo Magnetti
28	MF	FRA	Hiang'a Mbock
30	GK	FRA	Sébastien Cibois

=== Out on loan ===
Note: Flags indicate national team as defined under FIFA eligibility rules; some limited exceptions apply. Players may hold more than one non-FIFA nationality.

No.	Pos.	Nation	Player
—	DF	FRA	Guillaume Buon (on loan to Avranches)
—	MF	FRA	Derick Osei (on loan to Béziers)

== Pre-season and friendlies ==
Win Draw Loss

17 July 2019 Friendly	Brest (France)	2–1	(France) Lorient	Plabennec, France
18:30 CEST (UTC+2)	Faussurier 39'; Mbock 61'		Wissa 3'	Stadium: Stade de Kervéguen

20 July 2019 Friendly	Guingamp (France)	1–2	(France) Brest	Rostrenen, France
18:00 CEST (UTC+2)	Julan 72'		Charbonnier 4'; Osei 28'	Stadium: Stade Pierre Prat

23 July 2019 Friendly	Brest (France)	1–0	(France) Rennes	Plouvorn, France
19:00 CEST (UTC+2)	Court (yellow card) 32'; Osei 81'; Genty (yellow card) 86'		Trouillet (yellow card) 65'; Gelin (yellow card) 90'	Stadium: Stade Guy de Reals

26 July 2019 Friendly	Brest (France)	1–0	(France) Nantes	Inzinzac-Lochrist, France
19:00 CEST (UTC+2)	N'Goma 32'			Stadium: Stade de Mané-Braz; Attendance: 1,000; Referee: Amaury Delerue (France)

3 August 2019 Friendly	Brest (France)	1–1	(Spain) Levante	Brest, France
18:30 CEST (UTC+2)	Autret 13'		León 19'	Stadium: Stade Francis-Le Blé; Referee: Mugmer Cyril

== Competitions ==
=== Overview ===
Competition	First match	Last match	Starting round	Final position	Record							
Competition	First match	Last match	Starting round	Final position	Pld	W	D	L	GF	GA	GD	Win %
Ligue 1	10 August 2019	7 March 2020	Matchday 1	14th	28	8	10	10	34	37	−3	28.57
Coupe de France	5 January 2020		Round of 64	Round of 64	1	0	0	1	1	2	−1	0.00
Coupe de la Ligue	30 October 2019	8 January 2020	Round of 32	Quarter-finals	3	1	1	1	4	4	+0	33.33
Total					32	9	11	12	39	43	−4	28.13

Source: Soccerway

=== Ligue 1 ===
==== League table ====
Pos	Team	Pld	W	D	L	GF	GA	GD	Pts	PPG
12	Bordeaux	28	9	10	9	40	34	+6	37 (Note: Bordeaux finished ahead of Nantes on head-to-head points: Bordeaux 2–0 Nantes, Nantes 0–1 Bordeaux.)	1.32
13	Nantes	28	11	4	13	28	31	−3	37	1.32
14	Brest	28	8	10	10	34	37	−3	34	1.21
15	Metz	28	8	10	10	27	35	−8	34	1.21
16	Dijon	28	7	9	12	27	37	−10	30	1.07

Source: Ligue 1
Rules for classification: 1) Points per game; 2) Head-to-head points; 3) Head-to-head goal difference; 4) Goal difference; 5) Goals scored; 6) Fairplay ranking.

==== Results summary ====
Overall								Home						Away					
Pld	W	D	L	GF	GA	GD	Pts	W	D	L	GF	GA	GD	W	D	L	GF	GA	GD
28	8	10	10	34	37	−3	34	6	6	2	21	11	+10	2	4	8	13	26	−13

Source: Ligue 1

==== Results by round ====
Round	1	2	3	4	5	6	7	8	9	10	11	12	13	14	15	16	17	18	19	20	21	22	23	24	25	26	27	28	29	30	31	32	33	34	35	36	37	38
Ground	H	A	H	A	H	A	H	A	H	A	H	A	H	H	A	H	A	H	A	A	H	A	H	A	A	H	A	H	A	H	A	H	A	H	A	H	A	H
Result	D	D	W	L	D	D	D	L	W	W	W	L	L	D	L	W	L	D	L	W	W	L	D	D	W	D	L	L	C	C	C	C	C	C	C	C	C	C
Position	12	12	7	12	13	15	13	18	12	9	6	9	12	13	15	12	14	15	15	14	14	14	14	13	13	13	14	14	14	14	14	14	14	14	14	14	14	14

Source: Ligue 1
A = Away; H = Home; W = Win; D = Draw; L = Loss; C = Cancelled

==== Matches ====
The Ligue 1 schedule was announced on 14 June 2019. The Ligue 1 matches were suspended by the LFP on 13 March 2020 due to COVID-19 until further notices. On 28 April 2020, it was announced that Ligue 1 and Ligue 2 campaigns would not resume, after the country banned all sporting events until September. On 30 April, The LFP ended officially the 2019–20 season.

10 August 2019 1	Brest	1–1	Toulouse	Brest
20:00 CEST (UTC+2)	Autret 25'	Report	Koulouris 89'	Stadium: Stade Francis-Le Blé; Attendance: 14,236; Referee: Olivier Thual

18 August 2019 2	Saint-Étienne	1–1	Brest	Saint-Étienne
15:00 CEST (UTC+2)	Bouanga 83'; Moukoudi (yellow card) 85'	Report	Belkebla (yellow card) 18'; Faussurier 45+1'; Charbonnier (yellow card) 65'	Stadium: Stade Geoffroy-Guichard; Attendance: 28,645; Referee: Johan Hamel

24 August 2019 3	Brest	1–0	Reims	Brest
20:00 CEST (UTC+2)	Charbonnier (yellow card) 60', (goal) 86'	Report	Dingomé (yellow card) 61'	Stadium: Stade Francis-Le Blé; Attendance: 13,940; Referee: Hakim Ben El Hadj

31 August 2019 4	Nîmes	3–0	Brest	Nîmes
20:00 CEST (UTC+2)	Ferhat 2'; Valls 33'; Fomba (yellow card) 79'; Denkey 90'	Report	Perraud (yellow card) 14'; Chardonnet (yellow card) 15'; Court (yellow card) 27'; Castelletto (yellow card) 71'	Stadium: Stade des Costières; Attendance: 12,488; Referee: Thomas Leonard

14 September 2019 5	Brest	0–0	Rennes	Brest
20:00 CEST (UTC+2)	Autret (yellow card) 50'; Court (yellow card) 90+1'	Report	Da Silva (yellow card) 21'; Martin (yellow card) 90+2'	Stadium: Stade Francis-Le Blé; Attendance: 14,937; Referee: Clément Turpin

21 September 2019 6	Bordeaux	2–2	Brest	Bordeaux
20:00 CEST (UTC+2)	Briand 7'; Jovanović (yellow card) 41'; Adli (yellow card) 46'; Pablo 70'; Otávio (yellow card) 71'; Mexer (yellow card) 84'	Report	Grandsir 20'; Castelletto (yellow card) 23'; Belkebla (yellow card) 37'; Autret 45'; Bain (yellow card) 61'	Stadium: Matmut Atlantique; Attendance: 15,213; Referee: Benoît Millot

25 September 2019 7	Brest	2–2	Lyon	Brest
19:00 CEST (UTC+2)	Court 29', 85'	Report	Dembélé 28'; Cornet 70'	Stadium: Stade Francis-Le Blé; Attendance: 14,472; Referee: Amaury Delerue

28 September 2019 8	Monaco	4–1	Brest	Monaco
20:00 CEST (UTC+2)	Ballo-Touré (yellow card) 14'; Ben Yedder 27'; Slimani 63' (pen.); Gelson 74'; Keita 90'	Report	Mendy (yellow card) 51', (goal) 78'; Bain (yellow card) 89'	Stadium: Stade Louis II; Attendance: 4,576; Referee: Ruddy Buquet

5 October 2019 9	Brest	2–0	Metz	Brest
20:00 CEST (UTC+2)	Faussurier 11'; Court (yellow card) 28'; Castelletto 45'; Cardona (yellow card) 90+2'	Report	Cohade (yellow card) 51'	Stadium: Stade Francis-Le Blé; Attendance: 12,682; Referee: Antony Gautier

19 October 2019 10	Angers	0–1	Brest	Angers
20:00 CEST (UTC+2)	Pavlović (yellow card) 90+6'	Report	Cardona 67'	Stadium: Stade Raymond Kopa; Attendance: 10,369; Referee: Eric Wattellier

26 October 2019 11	Brest	2–0	Dijon	Brest
20:00 CEST (UTC+2)	Lasne 49'; Bain 52', (red card) 70'	Report		Stadium: Stade Francis-Le Blé; Attendance: 14,232; Referee: Jérémie Pignard

2 November 2019 12	Amiens	1–0	Brest	Amiens
20:00 CET (UTC+1)	Otero 27'; Calabresi (yellow card) 49'; Bodmer (yellow card) 58'; Zungu (yellow card) 90+5'	Report	Chardonnet (yellow card) 54'	Stadium: Stade de la Licorne; Attendance: 12,246; Referee: Frank Schneider

9 November 2019 13	Brest	1–2	Paris Saint-Germain	Brest
17:30 CET (UTC+1)	Grandsir 72'; Court (yellow card) 90+5'	Report	Di María 39'; Draxler (yellow card) 74'; Icardi 85'; Diallo (yellow card) 90+1'	Stadium: Stade Francis-Le Blé; Attendance: 15,144; Referee: Mikael Lesage

23 November 2019 14	Brest	1–1	Nantes	Brest
20:00 CET (UTC+1)	Bain (yellow card) 18'; Charbonnier (yellow card) 40'; Cardona 68'	Report	Basila (yellow card) 7'; Coulibaly 31'	Stadium: Stade Francis-Le Blé; Attendance: 14,232; Referee: Ruddy Buquet

29 November 2019 15	Marseille	2–1	Brest	Marseille
20:45 CET (UTC+1)	Sarr 56'; Radonjić 89'	Report	Diallo (yellow card) 20'; Cardona 88'; Mendy (yellow card) 90+3'	Stadium: Stade Vélodrome; Attendance: 50,014; Referee: Johan Hamel

3 December 2019 16	Brest	5–0	Strasbourg	Brest
19:00 CET (UTC+1)	Mendy 21'; Cardona (yellow card) 35'; Battocchio 45+1', 53', 75'; N'Goma (yellow card) 82', (goal) 90+4' (pen.)	Report	Liénard (yellow card) 90+2'	Stadium: Stade Francis-Le Blé; Attendance: 12,437; Referee: Jérôme Brisard

6 December 2019 17	Lille	1–0	Brest	Villeneuve-d'Ascq
19:00 CET (UTC+1)	Osimhen 16'	Report	Larsonneur (yellow card) 90+2'	Stadium: Stade Pierre-Mauroy; Attendance: 32,682; Referee: Eric Wattellier

14 December 2019 18	Brest	0–0	Nice	Brest
20:00 CET (UTC+1)	Diallo (yellow card) 1'; Castelletto (yellow card) 16'; Battocchio (yellow card) 63'	Report	Burner (yellow card) 30'; Dante (yellow card) 33'	Stadium: Stade Francis-Le Blé; Attendance: 13,042; Referee: Frank Schneider

21 December 2019 19	Montpellier	4–0	Brest	Montpellier
20:45 CET (UTC+1)	Laborde 13', 56'; Savanier 30' (pen.); Delort (yellow card) 49'; Mollet 83'	Report	Chardonnet (yellow card) 28'	Stadium: Stade de la Mosson; Attendance: 12,975; Referee: Jérémy Stinat

11 January 2020 20	Toulouse	2–5	Brest	Toulouse
20:00 CET (UTC+1)	Diakité 17', 20'; Vainqueur (yellow card) 84'	Report	Court 8'; Charbonnier 72', 77'; Mbock 79'; Cardona 85'	Stadium: Stadium de Toulouse; Attendance: 13,666; Referee: Hakim Ben El Hadj

25 January 2020 21	Brest	2–1	Amiens	Brest
20:00 CET (UTC+1)	Mendy 51', (yellow card) 68'; Faussurier (yellow card) 57'; Cardona 83'	Report	Guirassy 58' (pen.), (yellow card) 76'; Kakuta (yellow card) 74'; Monconduit (yellow card) 90'	Stadium: Stade Francis-Le Blé; Attendance: 12,866; Referee: Thomas Leonard

1 February 2020 22	Dijon	3–0	Brest	Dijon
20:00 CET (UTC+1)	Baldé 3', 20'; Mavididi 77'	Report	Autret (yellow card) 63'	Stadium: Stade Gaston Gérard; Attendance: 11,212; Referee: Olivier Thual

5 February 2020 23	Brest	1–1	Bordeaux	Brest
19:00 CET (UTC+1)	Castelletto (red card) 68'; Baal (yellow card) 72'; Cardona (yellow card) 79'; Benito 80' (o.g.)	Report	Hwang 10'	Stadium: Stade Francis-Le Blé; Attendance: 13,034; Referee: Willy Delajod

8 February 2020 24	Rennes	0–0	Brest	Rennes
20:00 CET (UTC+1)	Morel (yellow card) 46'; Léa Siliki (yellow card) 50'	Report	Court (yellow card) 23'; Charbonnier (yellow card) 50'; Autret (yellow card) 74'; Lasne (yellow card) 88'	Stadium: Roazhon Park; Attendance: 28,436; Referee: Ruddy Buquet

16 February 2020 25	Brest	3–2	Saint-Étienne	Brest
17:00 CET (UTC+1)	Lasne 20'; Charbonnier 38'; Cardona 43'; Chardonnet (yellow card) 51'; Larsonneur (yellow card) 55'	Report	Maçon (yellow card) 2'; Bouanga 54' (pen.), (yellow card) 55'; Diony 69'; Cabaye (yellow card) 83'	Stadium: Stade Francis-Le Blé; Attendance: 13,399; Referee: Eric Wattellier

21 February 2020 26	Nice	2–2	Brest	Nice
19:00 CET (UTC+1)	Danilo (yellow card) 6'; Hérelle (yellow card) 19'; Ounas 23'; Dolberg 33'; Nsoki (yellow card) 60'	Report	Grandsir 45'; Dante 53' (o.g.)	Stadium: Allianz Riviera; Attendance: 15,856; Referee: Jérémie Pignard

29 February 2020 27	Brest	0–1	Angers	Brest
20:00 CET (UTC+1)	Belkebla (yellow card) 86'; Court (yellow card) 90+4'; Charbonnier (yellow card) 90+7'	Report	Bahoken 43'; Petković (yellow card) 90+5'	Stadium: Stade Francis-Le Blé; Attendance: 13,313; Referee: Florent Batta

7 March 2020 28	Reims	1–0	Brest	Reims
20:00 CET (UTC+1)	Kamara (yellow card) 10'; Konan (yellow card) 27' (yellow-red card) 68'; Touré 37'	Report	Belkebla (yellow card) 32'; Magnetti (yellow card) 83'	Stadium: Stade Auguste Delaune; Attendance: 11,062; Referee: Karim Abed

29	Brest	Cancelled	Lille	Brest
--:-- CET (UTC+1)				Stadium: Stade Francis-Le Blé; Attendance: 0

30	Metz	Cancelled	Brest	Metz
--:-- CET (UTC+1)				Stadium: Stade Saint-Symphorien; Attendance: 0

31	Brest	Cancelled	Marseille	Brest
--:-- CEST (UTC+2)				Stadium: Stade Francis-Le Blé; Attendance: 0

32	Brest	Cancelled	Monaco	Brest
--:-- CEST (UTC+2)				Stadium: Stade Francis-Le Blé

33	Strasbourg	Cancelled	Brest	Strasbourg
--:-- CEST (UTC+2)				Stadium: Stade de la Meinau

34	Brest	Cancelled	Montpellier	Brest
--:-- CEST (UTC+2)				Stadium: Stade Francis-Le Blé

35	Paris Saint-Germain	Cancelled	Brest	Paris
--:-- CEST (UTC+2)				Stadium: Parc des Princes

36	Nantes	Cancelled	Brest	Nantes
--:-- CEST (UTC+2)				Stadium: Stade de la Beaujoire

37	Brest	Cancelled	Nîmes	Brest
--:-- CEST (UTC+2)				Stadium: Stade Francis-Le Blé

38	Lyon	Cancelled	Brest	Décines-Charpieu
--:-- CEST (UTC+2)				Stadium: Parc Olympique Lyonnais

=== Coupe de France ===
5 January 2020 Round of 64	Lorient	2–1 (a.e.t.)	Brest	Lorient
14:15 CET (UTC+1)	Marveaux 22' (pen.); Wissa 112'	Report	Charbonnier 36'; Diallo (yellow card) 90+1'	Stadium: Stade du Moustoir; Attendance: 10,686; Referee: Eric Wattellier

=== Coupe de la Ligue ===
30 October 2019 Round of 32	Metz	1–1 (3–4 p)	Brest	Metz
21:05 CET (UTC+1)	Niane 23'	Report	Cardona 57'; Belaud (yellow card) 89'	Stadium: Stade Saint-Symphorien; Attendance: 5,262; Referee: Jérôme Brisard
	Penalties
	Niane (penalty scored); Nguette (penalty missed); N'Doram (penalty scored); Traoré (penalty scored); Boulaya (penalty missed)		(penalty scored) Cardona; (penalty scored) Diallo; (penalty missed) Chardonnet; (penalty scored) Court; (penalty scored) Battocchio

18 December 2019 Round of 16	Brest	2–0	Bordeaux	Brest
21:05 CET (UTC+1)	Magnetti (yellow card) 21'; Court (yellow card) 37'; Grandsir 50'; Charbonnier 63'	Report	Tchouaméni (yellow card) 68'	Stadium: Stade Francis-Le Blé; Attendance: 5,434; Referee: Jérémie Pignard

8 January 2020 Quarter-finals	Lyon	3–1	Brest	Décines-Charpieu
18:45 CET (UTC+1)	Dembélé 19'; Tousart (yellow card) 41'; Aouar 55', (yellow card) 59'; Jean Lucas 90+1', (yellow card) 90+2'; Caqueret (yellow card) 90+3'	Report	Magnetti (yellow card) 59'; Charbonnier (yellow card) 63'; N'Goma (yellow card) 84'; Grandsir 85'; Perraud (yellow card) 87'	Stadium: Parc Olympique Lyonnais; Attendance: 20,096; Referee: Jérôme Brisard
