= Ferris N'Goma =

French footballer (born 1993)

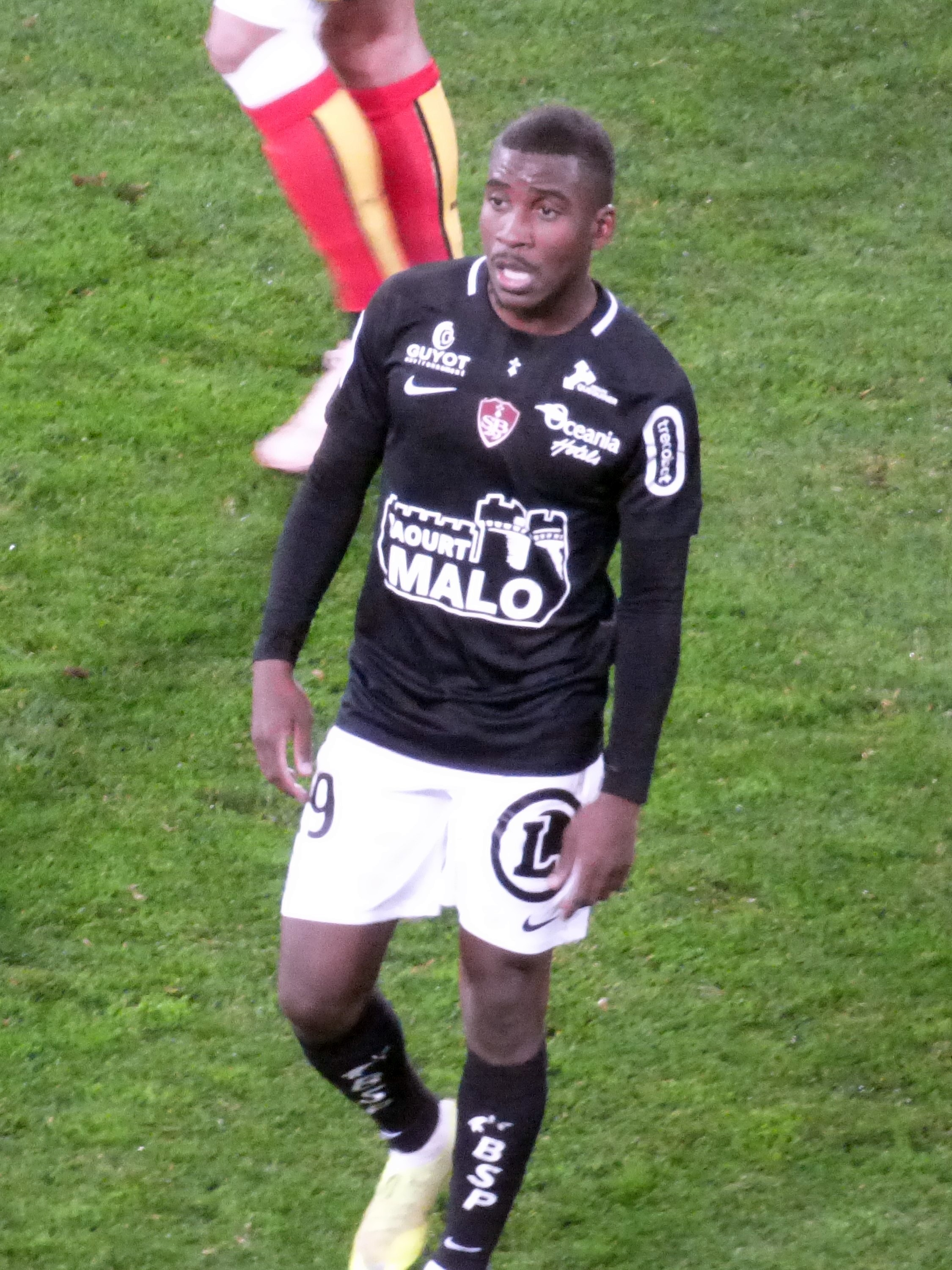
- N'Goma with Brest in 2018

Personal information
- Date of birth: 15 June 1993 (age 33)
- Place of birth: Limoges, France
- Height: 1.75 m (5 ft 9 in)
- Position: Forward

Senior career*
Years	Team	Apps	(Gls)
2012–2013	Montpellier B	17	(0)
2013–2015	Limoges	34	(8)
2015–2018	Orléans	52	(3)
2018–2021	Brest	36	(2)
2021–2023	Châteauroux	39	(3)
2022	Châteauroux B	2	(0)
2024–2025	Châteauroux	20	(0)

International career
2009	France U17	2	(0)
- * Club domestic league appearances and goals as of 26 May 2025

Ferris N'Goma (born 15 June 1993) is a French professional footballer who plays as a forward.

N'Goma has represented France at a youth international level, but remains eligible for the France and DR Congo national teams.

== Career statistics ==
As of match played 5 December 2019

Appearances and goals by club, season and competition
Club	Season	League			National Cup		League Cup		Other		Total	
Club	Season	Division	Apps	Goals	Apps	Goals	Apps	Goals	Apps	Goals	Apps	Goals
Limoges	2013–14	CFA 2	20	7	0	0	—		—		20	7
Limoges	2014–15	CFA	14	1	0	0	—		—		14	1
Limoges	Total		34	8	0	0	—		—		34	8
Orléans	2015–16	National	3	0	0	0	0	0	—		3	0
Orléans	2016–17	Ligue 2	18	1	0	0	0	0	2 (Note: Appearances in the Ligue 2 promotion play-offs)	0	20	1
Orléans	2017–18	Ligue 2	31	2	1	0	1	1	—		33	3
Orléans	Total		52	3	1	0	1	1	2	0	56	4
Brest	2018–19	Ligue 2	32	1	2	0	1	0	—		35	1
Brest	2019–20	Ligue 1	4	1	0	0	1	0	—		5	1
Brest	Total		36	2	2	0	2	0	0	0	40	2
Career total			122	13	3	0	3	1	2	0	130	14
