= Dénys Bain =

French footballer (born 1993)

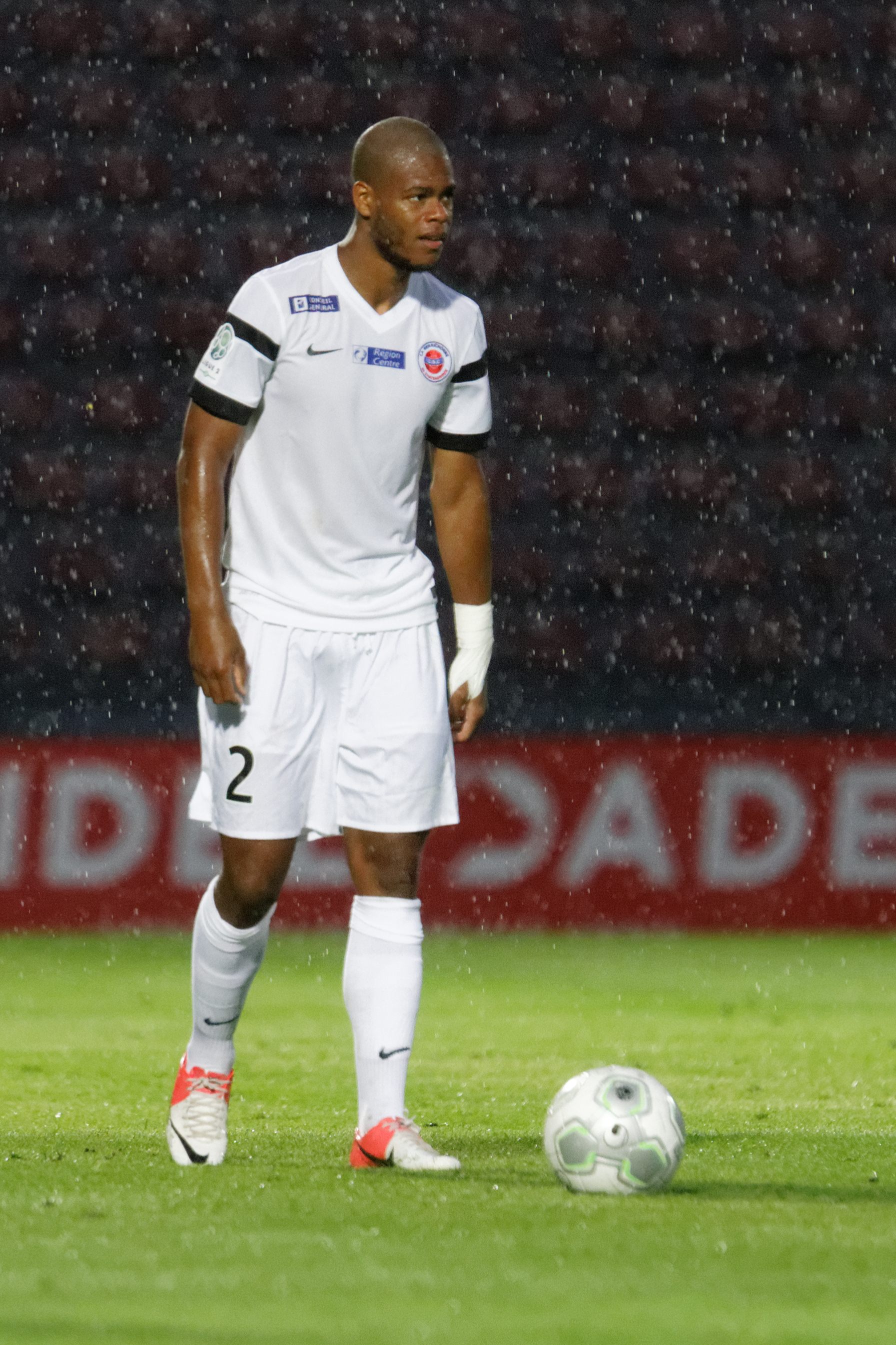
- Bain with Châteauroux in 2014

Personal information
- Date of birth: 2 July 1993 (age 33)
- Place of birth: Paris, France
- Height: 1.81 m (5 ft 11 in)
- Position: Defender

Senior career*
Years	Team	Apps	(Gls)
2011–2015	Châteauroux	58	(3)
2013–2014	Châteauroux B	16	(1)
2015–2019	Le Havre	135	(6)
2019–2022	Brest	17	(1)
2022–2023	Auxerre	2	(0)
- * Club domestic league appearances and goals as of 2 July 2023

Dénys Bain (born 2 July 1993) is a French professional footballer who plays as a defender.

== Career ==
Bain made his senior debut as a 17-year-old for Châteauroux, coming on for the final four minutes in a 1–0 win over Sedan in Ligue 2 on 20 May 2011.

On 28 August 2015, Bain joined Ligue 2 side Le Havre on a four-year contract.

On 6 July 2022, Bain signed for Ligue 1 side Auxerre on a one-year contract with an option for a further year.

== Personal life ==
Born in France, Bain is of Beninese descent.

== Career statistics ==
As of 1 July 2022

Appearances and goals by club, season and competition
Club	Season	League			National cup		League cup		Total	
Club	Season	Division	Apps	Goals	Apps	Goals	Apps	Goals	Apps	Goals
Châteauroux	2010–11	Ligue 2	1	0	0	0	0	0	1	0
Châteauroux	2011–12	Ligue 2	0	0	0	0	0	0	0	0
Châteauroux	2012–13	Ligue 2	1	0	0	0	0	0	1	0
Châteauroux	2013–14	Ligue 2	24	1	0	0	0	0	24	1
Châteauroux	2014–15	Ligue 2	29	2	2	0	1	0	32	2
Châteauroux	2015–16	National	3	0	0	0	1	0	4	0
Châteauroux	Total		58	3	2	0	2	0	62	3
Châteauroux B	2012–13	CFA 2	11	1	—		—		11	1
Châteauroux B	2013–14	CFA 2	2	0	—		—		2	0
Châteauroux B	2014–15	CFA 2	3	0	—		—		3	0
Châteauroux B	Total		16	1	—		—		16	1
Le Havre	2015–16	Ligue 2	28	0	0	0	0	0	28	0
Le Havre	2016–17	Ligue 2	36	0	0	0	2	0	38	0
Le Havre	2017–18	Ligue 2	37	1	1	0	1	0	39	1
Le Havre	2018–19	Ligue 2	34	5	3	0	3	0	40	5
Le Havre	Total		135	6	4	0	6	0	145	6
Brest	2019–20	Ligue 1	15	1	1	0	2	0	18	1
Brest	2020–21	Ligue 1	0	0	0	0	—		0	0
Brest	2021–22	Ligue 1	2	0	0	0	—		2	0
Brest	Total		17	1	1	0	2	0	20	1
Auxerre	2022–23	Ligue 1	0	0	0	0	—		0	0
Career total			226	11	7	0	10	0	243	11
