= Cristian Battocchio =

Argentine-born Italian footballer (born 1992)

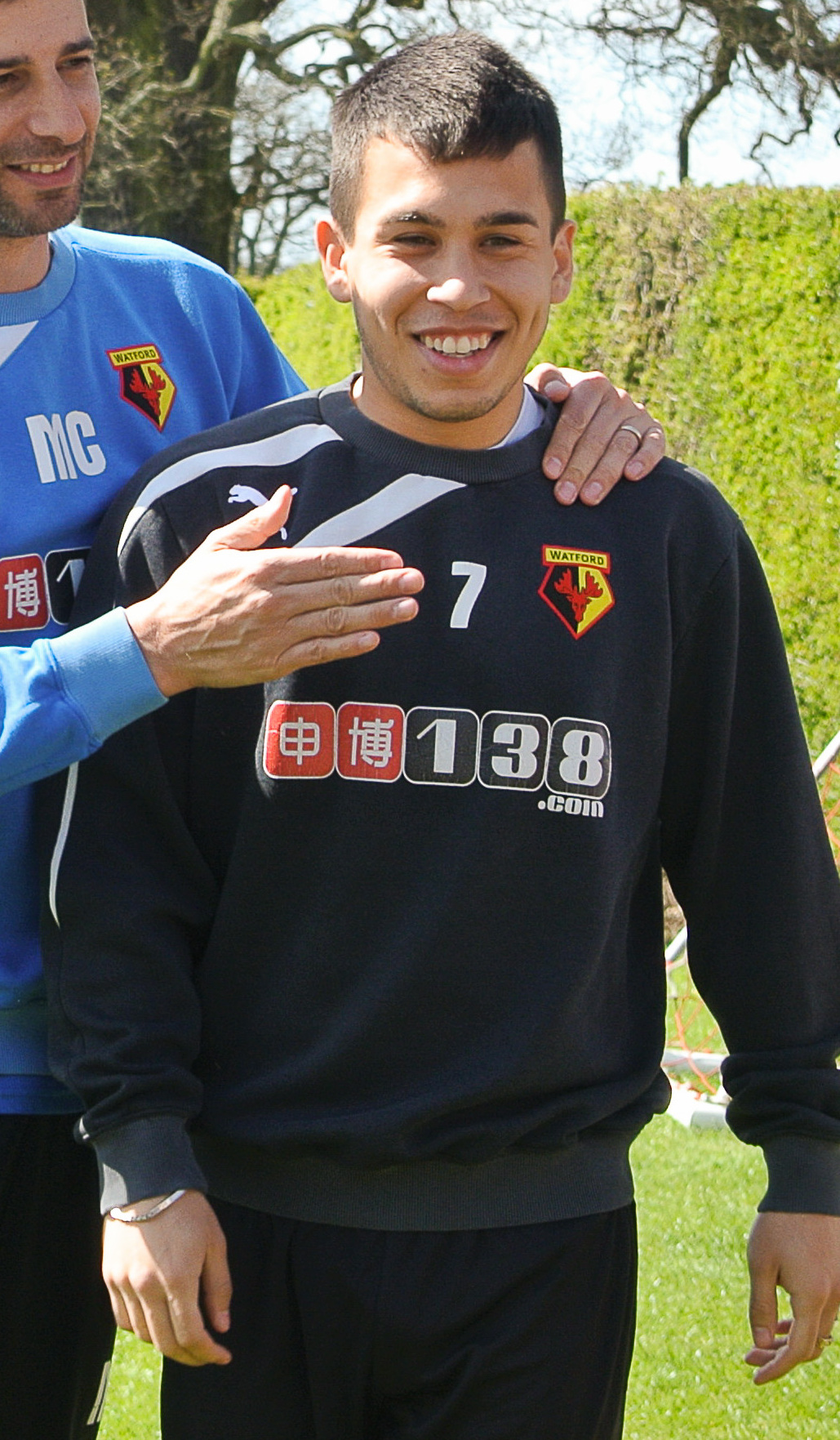
- Battocchio training with Watford in 2014

Personal information
- Full name: Cristian Damián Battocchio
- Date of birth: 10 February 1992 (age 34)
- Place of birth: Rosario, Argentina
- Height: 1.69 m (5 ft 7 in)
- Position: Midfielder

Team information
- Current team: Monopoli
- Number: 8

Youth career
- –2009: Newell's Old Boys
- 2009–2011: Udinese

Senior career*
Years	Team	Apps	(Gls)
2011–2013	Udinese	6	(0)
2012–2013	→ Watford (loan)	24	(2)
2013–2015	Watford	35	(4)
2014–2015	→ Virtus Entella (loan)	32	(0)
2015–2017	Brest	68	(13)
2017–2019	Maccabi Tel Aviv	25	(1)
2019–2021	Brest	53	(5)
2021	Tokushima Vortis	10	(0)
2021–2022	UNAM	18	(0)
2022–2023	Volos	4	(0)
2023	Sektzia Ness Ziona	12	(0)
2023–2024	Chennaiyin	17	(0)
2024–	Monopoli	69	(1)

International career
2011–2013	Italy U20	10	(1)
2013–2015	Italy U21	18	(2)
- * Club domestic league appearances and goals as of 1 May 2026

Cristian Damián Battocchio (Italian pronunciation: [ˈkristjam batˈtɔkkjo]; born 10 February 1992) is a professional footballer who plays as a midfielder for Serie C Group C club Monopoli. Born in Argentina, he represented Italy at the under-20 and under-21 international levels.

== Club career ==
=== Udinese ===
Born in Rosario, Argentina, Battocchio arrived at Italian club Udinese in 2009 at the age of 16 from Newell's Old Boys in Argentina for a transfer fee of €200,000 In the 2010–11 season he became the captain of the youth team of Udinese. On 27 February 2011, he made his debut with the first team of Udinese against Palermo in an historic 7–0 victory for Udinese, coming on from the bench after the game had already been won.

On 29 September 2011, he made his second appearance with the first team in the UEFA Europa League competition, facing Celtic in a 1–1 draw. before the match his first team coach Francesco Guidolin said that Battocchio was now ready for the first team and compared him to David Pizarro, Johan Walem, the youth coach of Udinese, said "he is now stable for the first team, has important qualities: vision of the game, a good foot, kick the penalties. He can do well as a deep-lying playmaker".

=== Watford ===
On 30 August 2012, Battocchio was loaned to Watford, with Watford having the choice to purchase him at the end of the deal. Battocchio played in Watford's 4–0 win over Huddersfield on 19 January, and scored Watford's final goal – his first for the club – with a lovely finish from a beautiful team move which has been described as one of the best team goals ever at Vicarage Road. This goal won Watford "Goal Of The Season" as voted by the fans and Battocchio was awarded the trophy. Battocchio then scored his second goal for Watford against Blackpool on 9 March 2013.

Battocchio signed for Watford on a permanent basis on 19 July 2013, with the contract running for a period of three years until 2016. Battocchio scored his first league goal as a permanent Watford player in a 1–0 win at home to Wigan Athletic on 28 September 2013.

==== Loan to Virtus Entella ====
After falling down the pecking order under then Watford manager Beppe Sannino, Battocchio moved on a season-long loan to Serie B side Virtus Entella on 26 August 2014.

=== Brest ===
Battocchio left Watford in the summer of 2015, signing a two-year deal at Stade Brestois 29 on 11 August 2015.

=== Maccabi Tel Aviv ===
On 10 July 2017, Battocchio signed a two-year contract at Maccabi Tel Aviv with an option to extend for another year.

=== Return to Brest ===
On 19 January 2019, Battocchio joined Brest for a second time. On 3 December 2019, he scored his first Brest goals (and Brest's first top-flight hat-trick in almost 29 years) in a 5–0 win over RC Strasbourg.

=== Tokushima Vortis ===
On 4 February 2021, Battochio signed for Japanese side Tokushima Vortis.

=== UNAM ===
In the summer of 2021, Battocchio arrived in Mexico City for a nice vacation, hired by Pumas UNAM.

=== Monopoli ===
On 2 August 2024, Battochio signed a contract with Monopoli in Serie C for one season, with an option to extend. In January 2026, Battocchio extended his contract with the Apulian side until the summer of 2027.

== International career ==
On 9 October 2011, Battocchio was called up to the Italy U20 squad by coach Luigi Di Biagio. Then, on 9 November 2011, he made his debut with Italy U20s in a friendly against Ghana U20s, ending in a 3–0 win for the Azzurri. He went on to play for Italy at U21 level.

== Career statistics ==
=== Club ===
As of match played 13 May 2023

Appearances and goals by club, season and competition
Club	Season	League			National Cup		League Cup		Europe		Total	
Club	Season	Division	Apps	Goals	Apps	Goals	Apps	Goals	Apps	Goals	Apps	Goals
Udinese	2010–11	Serie A	1	0	0	0	—		—		1	0
Udinese	2011–12	Serie A	4	0	0	0	—		3 (Note: Appearances in the Europa League)	0	7	0
Udinese	2012–13	Serie A	1	0	0	0	—		0	0	1	0
Udinese	Total		6	0	0	0	—		3	0	9	0
Watford (loan)	2012–13	Championship	24	2	1	0	0	0	—		25	2
Watford (loan)	2013–14	Championship	35	4	3	0	3	1	—		41	5
Watford (loan)	Total		59	6	4	0	3	1	—		66	7
Virtus Entella (loan)	2014–15	Serie B	32	0	0	0	—		—		32	0
Brest	2015–16	Ligue 2	33	5	1	0	0	0	—		36	5
Brest	2016–17	Ligue 2	35	8	2	0	2	0	—		39	8
Brest	Total		68	13	3	0	2	0	—		73	13
Maccabi Tel Aviv	2017–18	Ligat Ha`Al	25	1	0	0	5	0	11	0	41	1
Brest	2018–19	Ligue 2	14	2	0	0	0	0	—		14	2
Brest	2019–20	Ligue 1	10	0	0	0	1	0	—		11	0
Brest	Total		24	2	0	0	1	0	—		25	2
Tokushima Vortis	2021	J1 League	10	0	2	0	2	0	—		14	0
UNAM	2021–22	Liga MX	18	0	—		—		1	0	19	0
Volos	2022–23	Super League Greece	4	0	0	0	—		—		4	0
Sektzia Ness Ziona	2022–23	Ligat Ha`Al	12	0	0	0	0	0	—		12	0
Chennaiyin	2023–24	Indian Super League	17	0	3	0	1	0	—		21	0
Career total			275	22	12	0	14	1	15	0	316	23
