= Gautier Larsonneur =

French footballer (born 1997)

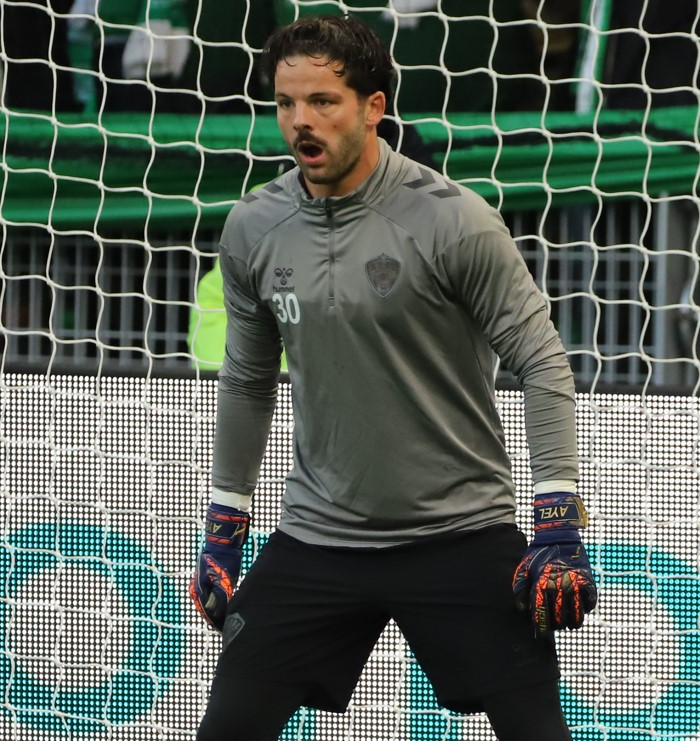
- Larsonneur with Saint-Étienne in 2024

Personal information
- Date of birth: 23 February 1997 (age 29)
- Place of birth: Saint-Renan, France
- Height: 1.81 m (5 ft 11 in)
- Position: Goalkeeper

Team information
- Current team: Saint-Étienne
- Number: 30

Youth career
- 2003–2008: US Plougonvelin
- 2008–2017: Brest

Senior career*
Years	Team	Apps	(Gls)
2014–2023	Brest B	41	(0)
2017–2023	Brest	135	(0)
2022–2023	→ Valenciennes (loan)	17	(0)
2023–	Saint-Étienne	117	(0)

International career
2018	France U21	2	(0)
- * Club domestic league appearances and goals as of 11 May 2026

Gautier Larsonneur (born 23 February 1997) is a French professional footballer who plays as a goalkeeper for Ligue 2 club Saint-Étienne.

== Club career ==
On 11 August 2017, Larsonneur made his professional debut with Brest, keeping a clean sheet in a 0–0 Ligue 2 draw to Gazélec Ajaccio.

On 12 July 2022, Larsonneur extended his contract with Brest until 2024 and was loaned to Ligue 2 side Valenciennes for the 2022–23 season, with the option to extend the loan for the 2023–24 season as well. However, on 6 January 2023, his loan at Valenciennes was cut short and he signed for fellow Ligue 2 side Saint-Étienne on a permanent transfer for a fee of €1.6 million. Larsonneur signed a contract until 30 June 2025.

== Career statistics ==
As of match played 17 May 2025

Appearances and goals by club, season, and competition
Club	Season	League			National cup		League cup		Other		Total	
Club	Season	Division	Apps	Goals	Apps	Goals	Apps	Goals	Apps	Goals	Apps	Goals
Brest B	2014–15	CFA 2	8	0	—		—		—		8	0
Brest B	2015–16	CFA 2	8	0	—		—		—		0	
Brest B	2016–17	CFA 2	23	0	—		—		—		23	0
Brest B	2021–22	National 3	2	0	—		—		—		2	0
Brest B	Total		41	0	—		—		—		41	0
Brest	2017–18	Ligue 2	36	0	0	0	1	0	1 (Note: Appearance in the Ligue 2 promotion play-offs)	0	38	0
Brest	2018–19	Ligue 2	37	0	0	0	0	0	—		37	0
Brest	2019–20	Ligue 1	27	0	1	0	0	0	—		28	0
Brest	2020–21	Ligue 1	35	0	0	0	—		—		35	0
Brest	2021–22	Ligue 1	0	0	3	0	—		—		3	0
Brest	Total		135	0	4	0	1	0	2	0	141	0
Valenciennes (loan)	2022–23	Ligue 2	17	0	1	0	—		—		18	0
Saint-Étienne	2022–23	Ligue 2	21	0	0	0	—		—		21	0
Saint-Étienne	2023–24	Ligue 2	32	0	1	0	—		3 (Note: One appearance in the Ligue 2 promotion play-offs, two appearances in the Ligue 1 relegation/promotion play-offs)	0	36	0
Saint-Étienne	2024–25	Ligue 1	34	0	0	0	—		—		34	0
Saint-Étienne	Total		87	0	1	0	—		3	0	91	0
Career total			280	0	6	0	1	0	4	0	291	0

== Honours ==
Individual

- UNFP Ligue 2 Goalkeeper of the Year: 2023–24
- UNFP Ligue 2 Team of the Year: 2023–24
