= Irvin Cardona =

Footballer (born 1997)

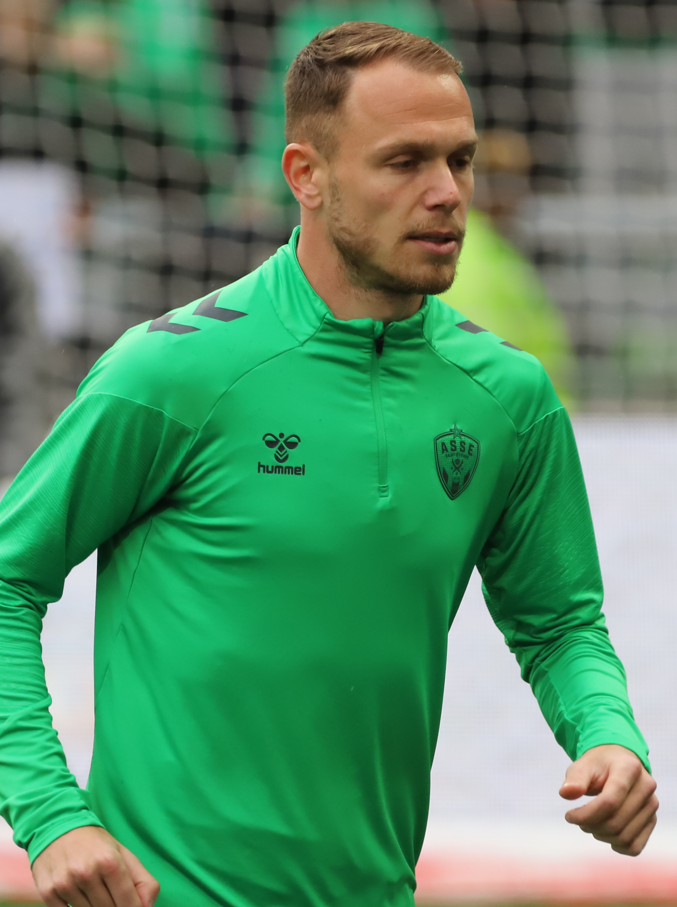
- Cardona with Saint-Étienne in 2025

Personal information
- Full name: Irvin Charly Jose Cardona
- Date of birth: 8 August 1997 (age 29)
- Place of birth: Nîmes, France
- Height: 1.85 m (6 ft 1 in)
- Positions: Forward; winger

Team information
- Current team: Saint-Étienne
- Number: 7

Youth career
- 2003–2012: Le Pontet
- 2012–2017: Monaco

Senior career*
Years	Team	Apps	(Gls)
2016–2017	Monaco B	21	(15)
2017–2019	Monaco	3	(0)
2017–2019	→ Cercle Brugge (loan)	35	(12)
2019–2023	Brest	99	(18)
2022	Brest B	2	(1)
2023–2025	FC Augsburg	13	(1)
2023–2025	FC Augsburg II	2	(1)
2024	→ Saint-Étienne (loan)	19	(8)
2024–2025	→ Espanyol (loan)	16	(1)
2025	→ Saint-Étienne (loan)	15	(5)
2025–	Saint-Étienne	46	(13)

International career^{‡}
2015	France U18	3	(0)
2016–2017	France U20	7	(2)
2025–	Malta	13	(3)
- * Club domestic league appearances and goals as of 20:40, 21 November 2026 (UTC) ‡ National team caps and goals as of 21:37, 16 November 2026 (UTC)

Irvin Charly Jose Cardona (born 8 August 1997) is a professional footballer who plays as a forward or winger for Ligue 2 club Saint-Étienne. Born in France, he represents the Malta national team.

== Club career ==
=== Monaco ===
Cardona made his professional debut on 2 February 2017 in the Coupe de France round of 32 against Chambly. He replaced Pierre-Daniel N'Guinda after 78 minutes in a 5–4 away win. He made his Ligue 1 debut ten days later coming on for Radamel Falcao to play the last 9 minutes of a 5–0 home thrashing of Metz.

==== Cercle Brugge (loan) ====
On 18 July 2017, Cardona extended his Monaco contract until 2021 and was immediately loaned to the club's Belgian satellite club Cercle Brugge for the following season. Although he missed a couple of weeks by an injury, he still was a major key player in the team that became champion of the 2017–18 Belgian First Division B. He scored an important penalty in the last minute in the champion's game against Beerschot-Wilrijk. He was voted second best player in the league, after teammate Xavier Mercier.

=== Brest ===
On 12 August 2019, Cardona signed with Ligue 1 promotees Brest. On 13 September 2020, he scored an acrobatic volley goal in a 2–0 away win over Dijon which was described as a "Puskás Award contender."

=== FC Augsburg ===
On 18 January 2023, Cardona signed a contract with German club FC Augsburg until 30 June 2027.

==== Loan to Saint-Étienne ====
On 3 January 2024, Cardona returned to France, joining Ligue 2 club Saint-Étienne on loan with an option-to-buy.

==== Loan to Espanyol ====
On 10 August 2024, Cardona moved on a new loan to Espanyol in La Liga.

=== Return to Saint-Étienne ===
On 28 January 2025, Cardona returned to Saint-Étienne on a new loan, with an option to buy. On 2 June 2025, Saint-Étienne exercised the option to buy and signed a three-year contract with Cardona.

== International career ==
Born in France, Cardona is of Maltese descent through a great-grandfather. He is a former youth international for France, having played up to the France U20s.

On 28 August 2025, he was called up to the Malta national team upcoming games in September. He made his debut on 4 September 2025, in a 2026 FIFA World Cup qualification against Lithuania which ended in a 1–1 draw.

On 9 September 2025, on his second cap, he scored his first international goal with Malta, the opener in a 3–1 friendly win against San Marino. Before half-time, Cardona was sent off following an altercation with Filippo Berardi.

== Career statistics ==
=== Club ===
As of match played 21 November 2026

Appearances and goals by club, season and competition
Club	Season	League			National cup		League cup		Other		Total	
Club	Season	Division	Apps	Goals	Apps	Goals	Apps	Goals	Apps	Goals	Apps	Goals
Monaco B	2015–16	CFA	4	1	—		—		—		4	1
Monaco B	2016–17	CFA	17	14	—		—		—		17	14
Monaco B	Total		21	15	0	0	0	0	0	0	21	15
Monaco	2016–17	Ligue 1	3	0	3	0	1 (Note: Appearance(s) in the Coupe de la Ligue)	0	0	0	7	0
Cercle Brugge (loan)	2017–18	Belgian First Division B	15	6	1	1	—		2 (Note: Appearances in Belgian First Division B promotion play-offs)	1	18	8
Cercle Brugge (loan)	2018–19	Belgian First Division A	20	6	0	0	—		—		20	6
Cercle Brugge (loan)	Total		35	12	1	1	0	0	2	1	38	14
Brest	2019–20	Ligue 1	21	6	1	0	1	1	—		23	7
Brest	2020–21	Ligue 1	36	8	2	0	—		—		38	8
Brest	2021–22	Ligue 1	32	4	3	0	—		—		35	4
Brest	2022–23	Ligue 1	10	0	0	0	—		—		10	0
Brest	Total		99	18	6	0	1	1	0	0	106	19
Brest B	2021–22	Championnat National 3	2	1	—		—		—		2	1
FC Augsburg	2022–23	Bundesliga	10	1	0	0	—		—		10	1
FC Augsburg	2023–24	Bundesliga	3	0	0	0	—		—		3	0
FC Augsburg	Total		13	1	0	0	—		0	0	13	1
FC Augsburg II	2023–24	Regionalliga	2	1	—		—		—		2	1
Saint-Étienne (loan)	2023–24	Ligue 2	19	8	0	0	—		3 (Note: One appearance and one goal in the Ligue 2 promotion play-offs, two appearances and one goal in the Ligue 1 relegation/promotion play-offs)	2	22	10
Espanyol (loan)	2024–25	La Liga	16	1	2	1	—		—		18	2
Saint-Étienne (loan)	2024–25	Ligue 1	15	5	—		—		—		15	5
Saint-Étienne	2025–26	Ligue 2	33	7	1	0	—		3 (Note: Promotion play-offs)	0	37	7
Saint-Étienne	2026–27	Ligue 2	13	6	0	0	—		0	0	13	6
Saint-Étienne	Total		46	13	1	0	—		3	0	50	13
Career total			269	75	11	1	2	1	8	3	391	81

=== International ===
As of match played 16 November 2026

Appearances and goals by national team and year
National team	Year	Apps	Goals
Malta	2025	6	2
Malta	2026	7	1
Total		13	3

Scores and results list Malta's goal tally first, score column indicates score after each Cardona goal.

List of international goals scored by Irvin Cardona
No.	Date	Venue	Opponent	Score	Result	Competition
1	9 September 2025	National Stadium, Ta' Qali, Malta	San Marino	1–0	3–1	Friendly
2	17 November 2025	National Stadium, Ta' Qali, Malta	Poland	1–1	2–3	2026 FIFA World Cup qualification
3	24 September 2026	Estadi de la FAF, Encamp, Andorra	Andorra	1–1	2–1	2026–27 UEFA Nations League D

== Honours ==
Monaco

- Ligue 1: 2016–17

Cercle Brugge

- Belgian First Division B: 2017–18
