= Julien Faussurier =

French footballer (born 1987)

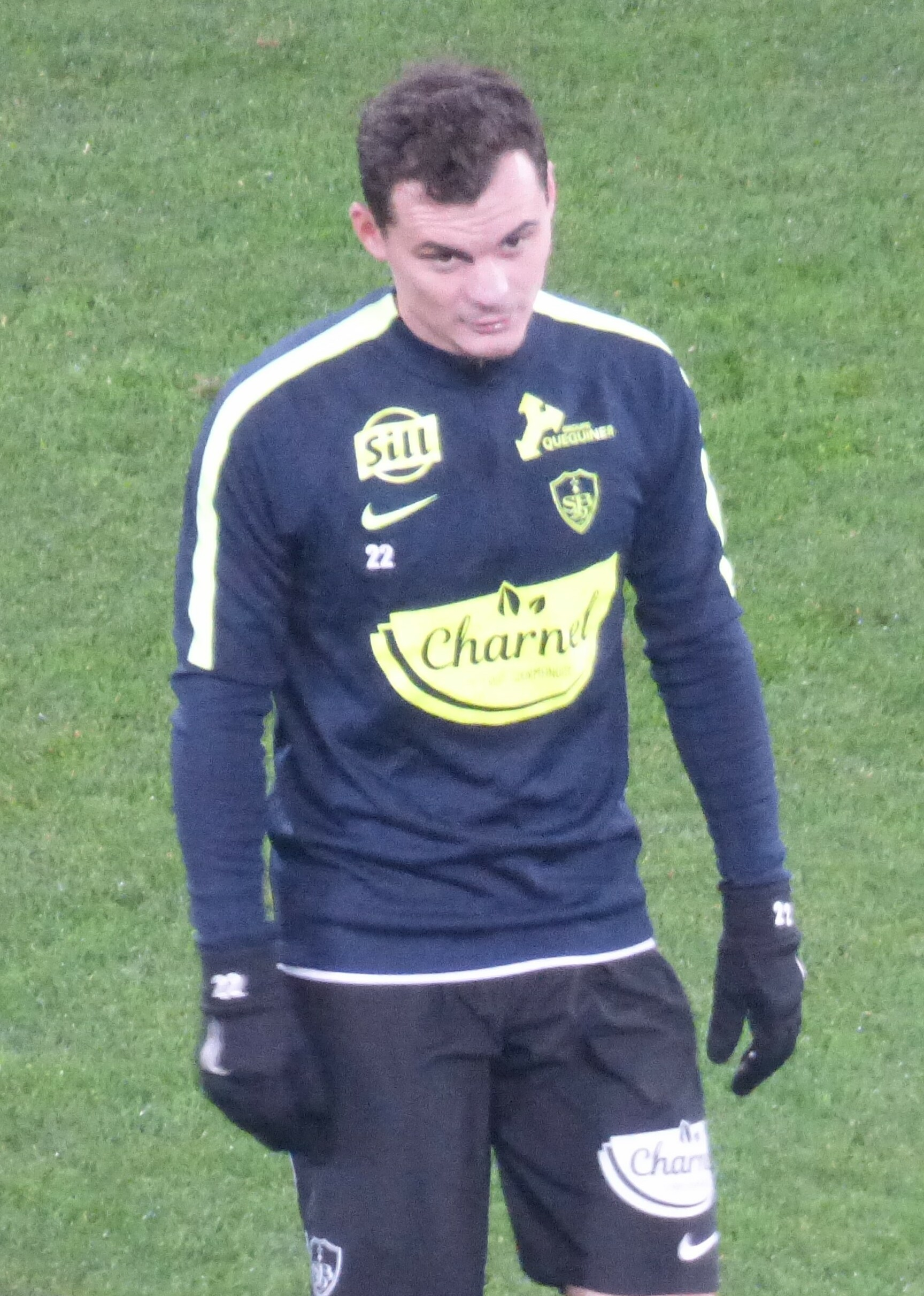
- Faussurier in 2018

Personal information
- Date of birth: 14 January 1987 (age 39)
- Place of birth: Lyon, France
- Height: 1.73 m (5 ft 8 in)
- Position: Defender

Team information
- Current team: Saint-Colomban Locminé
- Number: 25

Senior career*
Years	Team	Apps	(Gls)
2004–2007	Olympique Lyonnais B	53	(0)
2007–2013	Troyes AC	173	(13)
2013–2016	Sochaux	108	(0)
2016–2022	Brest	148	(14)
2022–2023	Sochaux	24	(0)
2023–2024	Concarneau	36	(0)
2024–	Saint-Colomban Locminé	34	(1)
- * Club domestic league appearances and goals as of 4 December 2025

Julien Faussurier (born 14 January 1987) is a French professional footballer who plays as a defender for Championnat National 1 club Saint-Colomban Locminé.

== Career ==
Faussurier was born in Lyon, France. He signed for then Ligue 2 side Troyes AC in the summer of 2008 from Olympique Lyonnais. He stayed with Troyes for a spell of five years and in June 2013, agreed to a four-year deal with the Ligue 1 outfit Sochaux. In July 2016, he signed a two-years contract at Stade Brestois 29 (Ligue 2).

On 19 July 2022, Faussurier returned to Sochaux. He signed a contract for one season with an option for a second season.

On 2 August 2023, Faussurier signed a one-year contract with Concarneau.

== Career statistics ==
=== Club ===
As of match played 9 November 2019

Appearances and goals by club, season and competition
Club	Season	League			Coupe de France		Coupe de la Ligue		Total	
Club	Season	Division	Apps	Goals	Apps	Goals	Apps	Goals	Apps	Goals
Troyes	2008–09	Ligue 2	35	0	0	0	0	0	35	0
Troyes	2009–10	National	38	5	0	0	3	1	41	6
Troyes	2010–11	Ligue 2	37	3	2	0	1	0	40	3
Troyes	2011–12	Ligue 2	35	2	3	0	1	0	39	2
Troyes	2012–13	Ligue 1	28	3	4	2	1	0	33	5
Troyes	Total		173	13	9	2	6	1	188	16
Sochaux	2013–14	Ligue 1	37	0	2	0	1	0	40	0
Sochaux	2014–15	Ligue 2	36	0	1	0	0	0	37	0
Sochaux	2015–16	Ligue 2	35	0	6	0	2	0	43	0
Sochaux	Total		108	0	9	0	3	0	120	0
Brest	2016–17	Ligue 2	38	3	1	0	2	0	41	3
Brest	2017–18	Ligue 2	38	8	2	0	1	0	41	8
Brest	2018–19	Ligue 2	18	1	1	0	0	0	19	1
Brest	2019–20	Ligue 1	12	2	0	0	0	0	12	2
Brest	Total		106	14	4	0	3	0	113	14
Career total			387	27	22	2	12	1	421	30
