= Ronaël Pierre-Gabriel =

French footballer (born 1998)

Personal information
- Full name: Ronaël Julien Pierre-Gabriel
- Date of birth: 13 June 1998 (age 28)
- Place of birth: Paris, France
- Height: 1.77 m (5 ft 10 in)
- Position: Right-back

Team information
- Current team: Volos
- Number: 18

Youth career
- 2006–2008: ES Parisienne
- 2008–2012: US Chevrières
- 2012–2014: CFFP
- 2014–2015: Saint-Étienne

Senior career*
Years	Team	Apps	(Gls)
2015–2018	Saint-Étienne B	15	(1)
2015–2018	Saint-Étienne	35	(0)
2018–2019	Monaco	4	(0)
2019–2023	Mainz 05	8	(0)
2020–2022	→ Brest (loan)	59	(1)
2022–2023	→ Strasbourg (loan)	14	(0)
2023	→ Espanyol (loan)	8	(1)
2023–2024	Nantes	12	(0)
2024–2026	Dinamo Zagreb	36	(3)
2026–	Volos	1	(0)

International career^{‡}
2016	France U18	3	(0)
2017	France U19	1	(0)
2017	France U21	1	(0)
- * Club domestic league appearances and goals as of 23 August 2026 ‡ National team caps and goals as of 7 October 2017

Ronaël Julien Pierre-Gabriel (born 13 June 1998) is a French professional footballer who plays as a right-back for Super League Greece club Volos.

== Career ==
Pierre-Gabriel is a youth exponent from Saint-Étienne. He made his Ligue 1 debut on 29 November 2015 against Guingamp. He started in the first eleven, before being substituted after 61 minutes for Pierre-Yves Polomat.

On 23 July 2022, Pierre-Gabriel joined Ligue 1 side Strasbourg on a season-long loan with an option-to-buy. On 18 January 2023, he moved on a new loan until the end of the season to Espanyol in Spain.

On 1 August 2023, Ligue 1 side Nantes announced the permanent signing of Pierre-Gabriel on a three-year contract.

On 7 February 2024, Pierre-Gabriel moved to Dinamo Zagreb in Croatia on a multi-year deal.

On 27 July 2026, Pierre-Gabriel signed for Super League Greece club Volos on a free transfer.

== Career statistics ==
As of match played 6 December 2025

Appearances and goals by club, season and competition
Club	Season	League			National cup (Note: Includes Coupe de France, Croatian Football Cup)		League cup (Note: Includes Coupe de la Ligue)		Europe		Other		Total	
Club	Season	Division	Apps	Goals	Apps	Goals	Apps	Goals	Apps	Goals	Apps	Goals	Apps	Goals
Saint-Étienne	2015–16	Ligue 1	5	0	2	0	1	0	0	0	—		8	0
Saint-Étienne	2016–17	Ligue 1	14	0	0	0	0	0	0	0	—		14	0
Saint-Étienne	2017–18	Ligue 1	16	0	1	0	0	0	—		—		17	0
Saint-Étienne	Total		35	0	3	0	1	0	0	0	0	0	39	0
Monaco	2018–19	Ligue 1	4	0	0	0	0	0	0	0	0	0	4	0
Monaco B	2018–19	CFA	6	0	—		—		—		—		6	0
Mainz 05	2019–20	Bundesliga	8	0	0	0	—		—		—		8	0
Brest (loan)	2020–21	Ligue 1	29	1	2	0	—		—		—		31	1
Brest (loan)	2021–22	Ligue 1	30	0	1	0	—		—		—		31	0
Brest (loan)	Total		59	1	3	0	—		—		—		62	1
Strasbourg (loan)	2022–23	Ligue 1	14	0	1	0	—		—		—		15	0
Espanyol (loan)	2022–23	La Liga	8	1	0	0	—		—		—		8	1
Nantes	2023–24	Ligue 1	12	0	0	0	—		—		—		12	0
Dinamo Zagreb	2023–24	Croatian Football League	7	0	4	0	—		0	0	—		11	0
Dinamo Zagreb	2024–25	Croatian Football League	28	3	3	1	—		10 (Note: Appearances in UEFA Champions League)	0	—		41	4
Dinamo Zagreb	2025–26	Croatian Football League	1	0	0	0	—		0	0	—		1	0
Dinamo Zagreb	Total		36	3	7	1	—		10	0	—		53	4
Career total			182	5	13	1	1	0	10	0	0	0	207	6
