= Angel Gomes =

English footballer (born 2000)

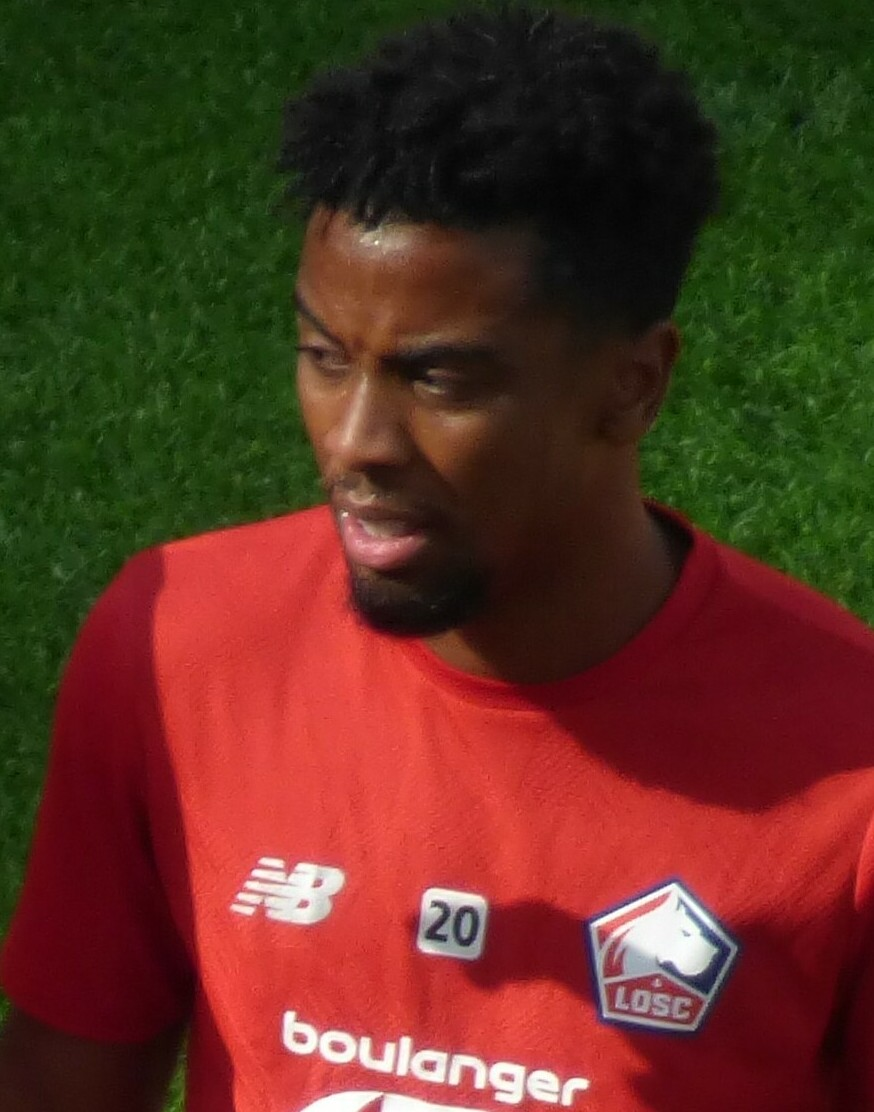
- Gomes warming up with Lille in 2021

Personal information
- Full name: Adilson Angel Abreu de Almeida Gomes
- Date of birth: 31 August 2000 (age 26)
- Place of birth: Edmonton, Greater London, England
- Height: 5 ft 6 in (1.68 m)
- Position: Midfielder

Team information
- Current team: Marseille
- Number: 7

Youth career
- 2006–2017: Manchester United

Senior career*
Years	Team	Apps	(Gls)
2017–2020	Manchester United	5	(0)
2020–2025	Lille	105	(4)
2020–2021	→ Boavista (loan)	30	(6)
2025–	Marseille	25	(4)
2026	→ Wolverhampton Wanderers (loan)	12	(0)

International career
2015–2016	England U16	9	(2)
2016–2017	England U17	13	(6)
2017	England U18	2	(0)
2018–2019	England U19	6	(1)
2019	England U20	6	(2)
2021–2023	England U21	18	(0)
2024	England	4	(0)
Medal record
Representing England
UEFA European Under-21 Championship
Winner	2023
FIFA U-17 World Cup
Winner	2017
- * Club domestic league appearances and goals as of 21:48, 22 November 2026 (UTC)

Adilson Angel Abreu de Almeida Gomes (born 31 August 2000), known simply as Angel Gomes, is an English professional footballer who plays as a midfielder for Ligue 1 club Marseille. A versatile player, he has also been deployed as an attacking midfielder, central midfielder and wide midfielder in his career.

Joining Manchester United at the age of six, Gomes made his first-team debut for the club in May 2017 and became the first player born in the 2000s to play in the Premier League. After ten appearances for the team, he was released at the end of his contract in 2020. He then signed for Lille in August and was immediately loaned out to Boavista for a season. Upon his return to France in 2021, he was included in the squad which won the 2021 Trophée des Champions, before making his Ligue 1 debut in August and his UEFA Champions League debut in September.

Besides his native England, Gomes was also eligible to represent Angola or Portugal at international level. He made more than 50 appearances for England's youth national teams, from under-16 to under-21 level. He was the captain of the England under-17 team that won the 2017 FIFA U-17 World Cup, and was a member of the under-21 squad that won the 2023 UEFA European Under-21 Championship. He debuted for the senior England side in September 2024.

== Early life ==
Adilson Angel Abreu de Almeida Gomes was born on 31 August 2000 in Edmonton, Greater London, England to the Angolan-born former Portugal under-21 international Gil Gomes during his father's time at Hendon. The Gomes family then moved to the Manchester area when Gil joined Middlewich Town, and settled in Salford, where Gomes grew up.

Former Portugal international and Manchester United winger Nani is Gomes' godfather, and he has said that Nani's influence was "massive" as he was somebody he idolised as a youngster.

== Club career ==
=== Manchester United ===
==== 2006–17: Early years ====
Gomes started training with the Manchester United youth system at the age of six, in 2006, and made his debut for the club's U18 team when he was 14. He captained the Manchester United U15 team in 2015 at the Manchester United Premier Cup and was named MVP, despite United finishing in 12th place at the tournament.

After signing as an academy first-year scholar ahead of the 2016–17 season, Gomes scored three goals against Everton on 27 August 2016, and became the third youngest Manchester United academy player to achieve the feat in the club's history at the age of 15 years and 362 days. He then sustained an injury in April 2017 towards the conclusion of the season. Despite this, he finished as the club's top goalscorer and was named Jimmy Murphy Young Player of the Year as the youngest recipient for the award. His form led him to train with the first-team ahead of the final game in the 2016–17 season of the Premier League.

==== 2017–20: First-team appearances and departure ====
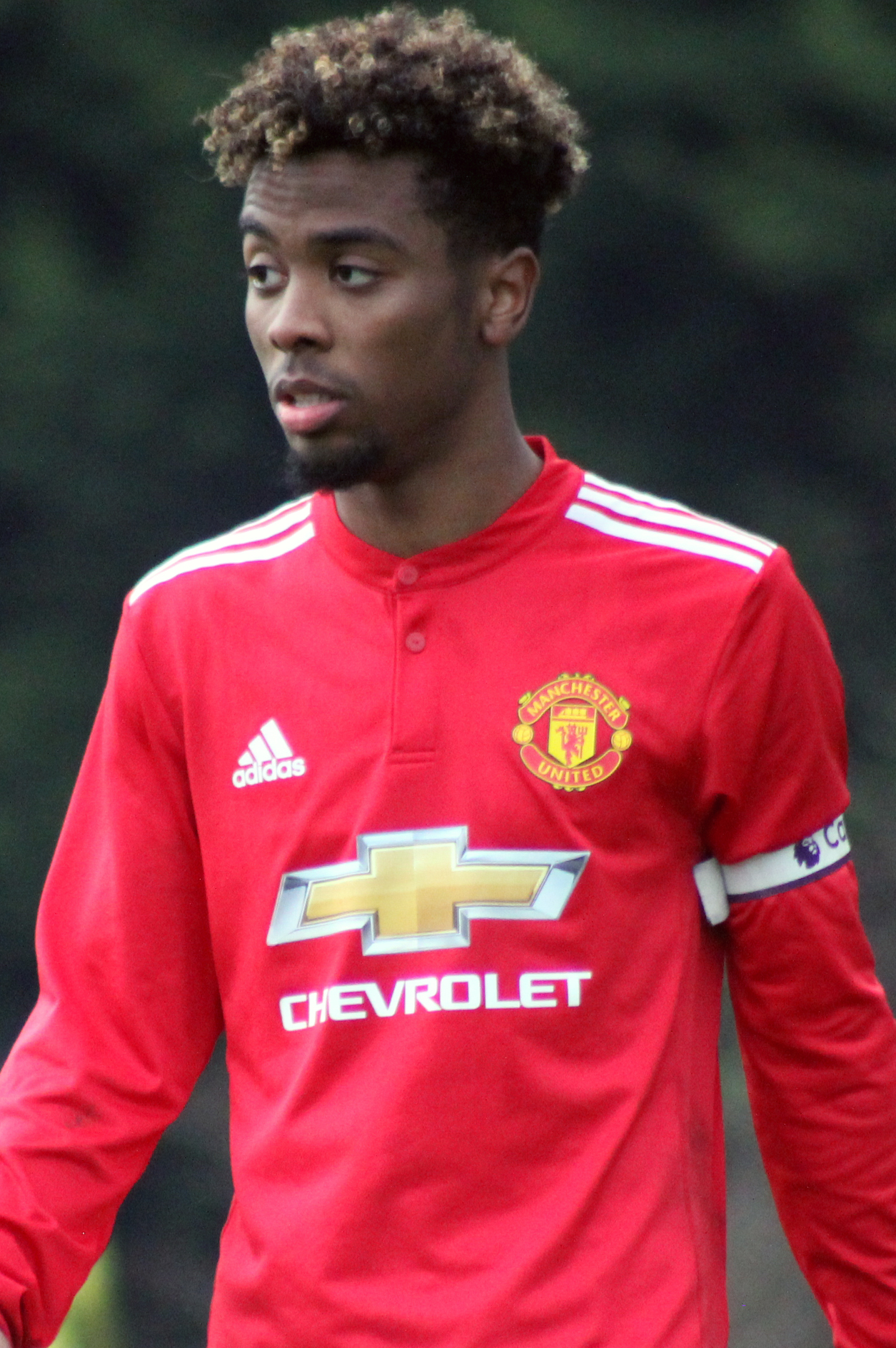
Gomes playing for Manchester United U18 in 2017

Gomes made his first-team debut on 21 May 2017, replacing Wayne Rooney in the 88th minute of a 2–0 home victory over Crystal Palace. At 16 years, 263 days old, he became the youngest player to represent Manchester United since Duncan Edwards in 1953, as well as the first player born in the 2000s to appear in the Premier League.

On 13 December 2017, Gomes signed his first professional contract with Manchester United, and on 26 January 2018, he made his FA Cup debut, coming on as an 88th-minute substitute for Marcus Rashford in a 4–0 victory against Yeovil Town in the Fourth Round.

Two years and two months after his senior debut, on 25 July 2019, Gomes scored his first senior goal in a 2–1 pre-season friendly win against Tottenham Hotspur. However, he found first-team opportunities hard to come by during the 2019–20 season, playing just six times in all competitions. Despite protracted negotiations, Manchester United were unable to sign Gomes to a contract extension, and he was released on 30 June 2020.

=== Lille ===
==== 2020–21 season: Loan to Boavista ====
On 4 August 2020, Gomes signed a five-year contract with French club Lille, and was immediately loaned out to Portuguese club Boavista for the 2020–21 campaign. In 2021, he revisited the signing in an interview with English media and explained his choice to leave his boyhood club to get more game time. Gomes stated: "There was a contract there that was on the table for me to sign. Everyone always says I left for money which, for me, makes no sense [...]. It was more to do with the pathway and the opportunity that Lille were bringing [...]. It was a big step, and I knew it was going to be one."

On his league debut for Boavista, he registered a hat-trick of assists and was awarded man of the match in a 3–3 draw against Nacional on 19 September. Two weeks later, Gomes scored his first goal for the club and as a professional with a wonder strike from the halfway line in a match against Moreirense. On 2 November, Gomes won a penalty and then converted the spot-kick in a 3–0 win against Benfica. He ended his Portugal stint with 32 appearances including two starts in the Taça de Portugal. Scoring six goals and providing six assists in the 2020–21 Primeira Liga, his first complete professional season as a starter, he helped the historic Porto side to avoid relegation.

==== 2021–22 season: Ligue 1 and European debuts ====
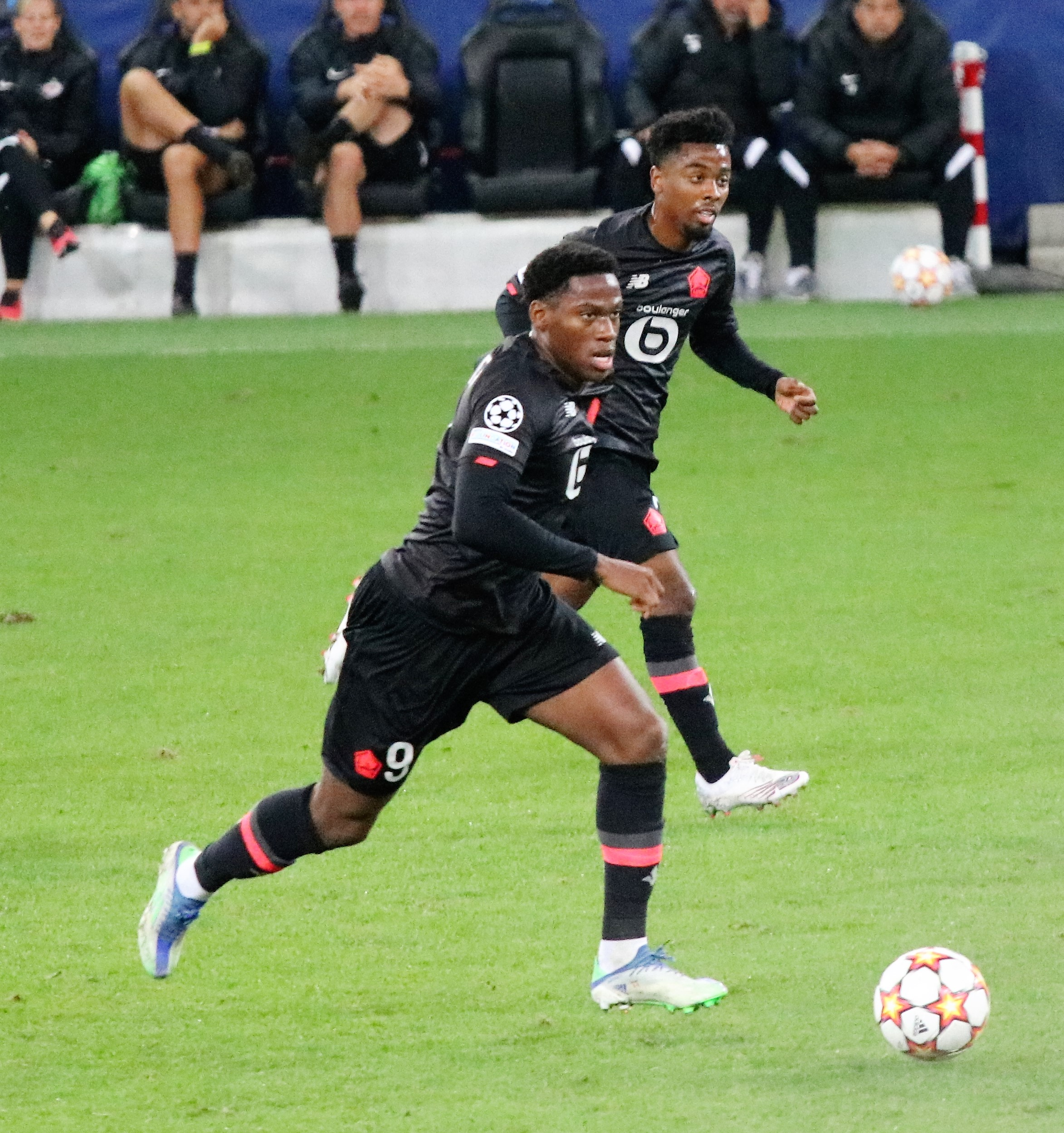
Jonathan David and Gomes (back) playing for Lille in 2021

After a successful loan spell in the Primeira Liga with Boavista, Gomes returned to Lille on 1 July 2021. He was included in the squad for the club's Trophée des Champions win over Paris Saint-Germain at Bloomfield Stadium in Tel Aviv, Israel on 1 August. Despite not coming on the pitch, he earned his first trophy as a professional and the first French super cup in the history of the club. Three weeks later, he made his Lille debut in the 2021–22 Ligue 1 season 3rd round at Saint-Étienne on 21 August, coming on as a substitute for Jonathan David and playing the final minutes of the match.

The next month, on 14 September 2021, he played his first UEFA Champions League match against VfL Wolfsburg in the group stage, starting as a left midfielder. In December, Gomes then scored his first Champions League goal also against the German team, in the last round of the group stage, besides delivering an assist in the game after coming on in the 68th minute. For the remainder of the Lille season, he was then primarily used as a back-up attacking midfielder or forward and ended up playing an average of around 40 minutes per match.

==== 2022–23 season: Repositioning and breakthrough ====
Following Paulo Fonseca's arrival as Lille head coach, Gomes started the 2022–23 season as a central midfielder alongside French and Ligue 1 veteran Benjamin André, behind playmaker and attacking midfielder Rémy Cabella, in a 4–1 home win over Auxerre. He ended the match with 8 ball recoveries and a 90% pass completion rate. After other good performances in August, he was praised by reporters for his importance in the Lille attacking system – appearing in L'Équipe and Prime Video Teams of the Week – and was named Lille Player of the Month. After a 4–3 home victory against Monaco on 23 October, where he played alongside André Gomes, he was again named in L'Équipe Team of the Week. He gradually became a steady and consistent player in the Lille midfield, within the rotation alongside Benjamin André and André Gomes, and eventually started as the playmaker in some matches in the second part of the season. Delivering a total of 6 assists in the Ligue 1 season and having one of the best pass completion rate in the league (87.89%), he helped Lille to secure the 5th place with a UEFA Europa Conference League qualification.

==== 2023–24 season: Third season in France ====
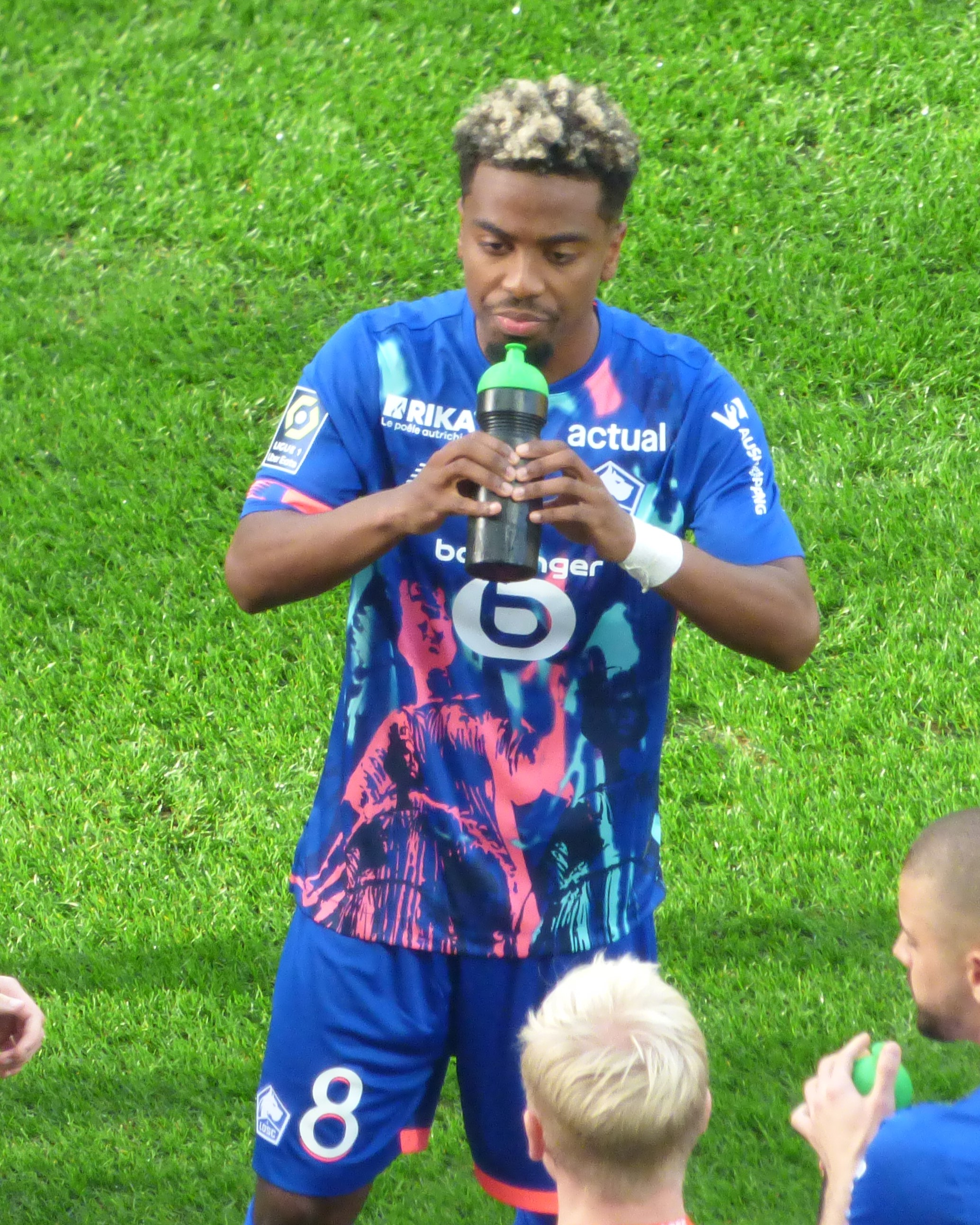
Gomes playing for Lille in 2023

During the offseason, Gomes decided to switch his Lille's shirt number. After wearing number 20 during his first two full seasons with the club, he chose to swap it for number 8. The shirt had previously been worn by former notable players such as Michel Bastos, Moussa Sow, Salomon Kalou, and Xeka. Lille began their 2023–24 Ligue 1 season on 11 August 2023, with Gomes coming off the bench and assisting a late Bafodé Diakité's header in a 1–1 home draw against Nice. He then played every Ligue 1 game from summer to spring, starting alternatively as a holding, central or attacking midfielder and only missing round 9 for a yellow card suspension.

On 17 February 2024, Gomes played his 100th game for Lille in a 3–0 home win against newly promoted team Le Havre and provided an assist to Jonathan David who scored a hat-trick in the match. He stated after the match: "Taking that step is something wonderful for me. This is a seal of approval. Playing is my primary goal." After a minor thigh injury causing him to miss two home wins against Lens and Marseille, he played only a few minutes in the Europa Conference League quarter-finals two legs against Aston Villa in which Lille nearly made it to the semi-finals but lost on penalties. With a total of 8 assists, he finished the league season as the joint-top assist provider alongside Ousmane Dembélé and Romain Del Castillo. Playing more than 3,000 minutes in all competitions this season, he was praised for his passing abilities and was one of the top midfielders for ball retention under high pressure according to the International Centre for Sports Studies. He was also part of the world's top 100 midfield distributors which includes the number of successful passes per match, the percentage of successful passes, the ratio of passes compared to teammates, as well as the average level of matches played. His growing power was acclaimed by pundits in Europe such as former Premier League star Ian Wright calling Gomes ready for a national senior team call-up.

==== 2024–25 season ====
On 17 August 2024, Gomes suffered a head injury in a 0–2 Ligue 1 away win at Reims. Following a violent collision with Reims midfielder Amadou Koné who was subsequently sent off, he was treated on the pitch for over 30 minutes and was taken to the hospital afterwards. His club then stated after the match that he was able to return home, and was "following medical concussion protocol." He then made his return two weeks later, starting against Paris Saint-Germain on 1 September.

=== Marseille ===
On 11 June 2025, fellow Ligue 1 club Marseille agreed to sign Gomes on a free transfer upon the expiration of his contract with Lille at the end of the month. On 4 July, Marseille confirmed the transfer, with Gomes signing a three-year contract.

Gomes made his debut for l'OM in a 1–0 loss to Rennes in the team's opening match of the 2025–26 Ligue 1 season. His first goal for the club came in a 4–0 win over Lorient at the Stade Vélodrome on 12 September.

After beginning the season as a deep-lying playmaker, Gomes was moved into a more attacking role and scored in consecutive matches against Auxerre and Brest at the start of November.

On 29 November, Gomes was substituted at half-time on a 2–2 draw with Toulouse. After this, he made only one eight minute substitute appearance in a 5–2 win at Angers in OM's next six Ligue 1 matches.

On 20 January 2026, L'Équipe reported that Marseille would allow Gomes to leave the club before the end of the winter transfer window.

==== Loan to Wolverhampton Wanderers ====
On 2 February 2026, Gomes joined Premier League club Wolverhampton Wanderers on loan for the remainder of the 2025–26 season.

== International career ==
=== Youth ===
In addition to his native England, Gomes was also eligible to represent Angola and Portugal. He eventually chose to represent his country of birth at youth international level and played for every England youth team.

In August 2015, Gomes began his international career when he made two appearances for England at under-16 level, both against the United States. He then captained the U16 team, making nine appearances and scoring two goals in total at this level. The following year, he was called up to the England under-17 team in August 2016, and scored four minutes into his debut while captaining his nation to a 3–1 victory over Belgium. A year later, he played in the 2017 UEFA European Under-17 Championship qualification but missed out on the tournament in May due to injury. Five months later, he played and scored in the England's opening game of the 2017 FIFA U-17 World Cup and ultimately led the team to their first title, being one of the team captains. Gomes made a total of 13 appearances and scored six goals at U17 level with his country. A few weeks earlier, he made his debut at under-18 level when he captained England in a 0–0 draw with Brazil on 1 September 2017. He then quickly moved to the next level and scored one goal in six appearances for the England under-19 team.

Gomes made his England under-20 debut during a 0–0 draw against the Netherlands on 5 September 2019. He made six appearances in total for the under-20 team and scored two goals. In 2021, he received his first call up for the England under-21 squad and made his debut as a substitute during a 1–0 2023 UEFA European Under-21 Championship qualification win away to Andorra on 11 October. Two years later, Gomes was included in the England squad for the 2023 European Under-21 Championship, being the only member of the team to play outside the Premier League and the EFL Championship. Starting as a central midfielder in five of the six England fixtures, he won the tournament on 8 July after the Young Lions beat Spain 1–0 in the final and was one of the best players on his team for his last matches with the side, making a total of 18 appearances at U21 level.

=== Senior ===
On 29 August 2024, Gomes was called up to the England senior squad by interim manager Lee Carsley for the UEFA Nations League matches against the Republic of Ireland and Finland. On 7 September, he debuted in a 2–0 away win against the Republic of Ireland at Aviva Stadium in Dublin. Coming on as a substitute to Kobbie Mainoo in the 77th minute, he wore number 19 and helped England's midfield to manage well the end of the match according to several reports. He hence became the Three Lions' 1284th capped player. His close friend Morgan Gibbs-White also made his international debut in Ireland, coming off the bench at the same time as Gomes. He then made his first start in a 2–0 home win against Finland at Wembley Stadium three days later. Deployed as a deep-lying playmaker alongside Declan Rice in a 4–2–3–1 formation, he was praised for his performance and is the first player to represent England whilst playing for a French club since Trevor Steven in 1992.

== Style of play ==
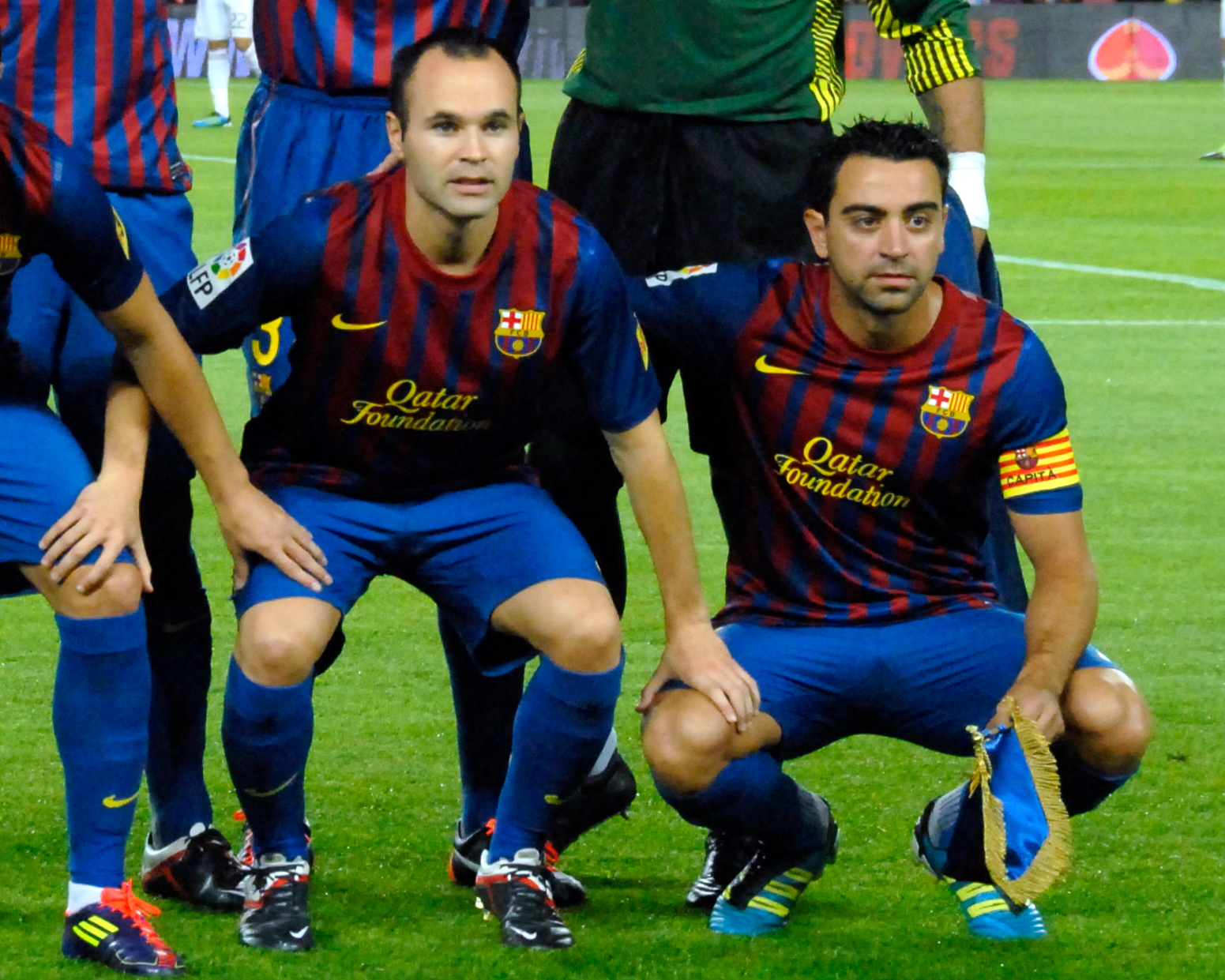
Andrés Iniesta (left) and Xavi (right), Gomes' role models

A footballer described as versatile, Gomes is capable of playing in all midfield positions whereas he preferred to be deployed as an attacking midfielder behind the forward. His playing style has been compared to that of Ronaldinho due to his creativity, composure and dribbling. In January 2015, Nani described Gomes as Manchester United's next star. Manchester United graduate Danny Webber said: "Gomes is still very small, but he sees the game seconds before others. Angel is like Paul Scholes; he can dictate a game with his intelligence." After having mostly played as a left midfielder and even as a centre-forward for his first season in France, his Lille manager Paulo Fonseca started to deploy him as a central midfielder in a position where he is in charge of recovering the ball and directing the play. When asked about his style of play after his first England senior team call-up, Gomes then stated: "I would like to say I am just a midfielder. I can operate in all three roles: I can play as the deep-lying midfielder, I can play as a No 8, I can play as a No 10. I just love to play in the midfield and be able to distribute and help the team play in all different areas of the pitch. I am confident. I like keeping the ball, I like taking responsibility."

In an interview for Lille website in September 2022, Gomes cited Spanish midfielders Andrés Iniesta and Xavi along with Bernardo Silva and Marco Verratti as inspirations, and emphasised their vision and skill despite a lack of height and strength, features they have in common (he is 5 ft 6 in (1.68 m) tall). He confided: "When I was a child, I watched Barcelona a lot. I loved Andrés Iniesta, Xavi, I was inspired by their way of playing." On 9 March 2023, Gomes cited in L'Équipe Silva's ability to switch positions as an inspiration: "I feel comfortable playing in midfield or more attacking positions, I don't really have a preference [...]. The best in this role is Bernardo Silva. I first look at his presence, he looks a bit like me in size [...]. He's everywhere on the pitch, he's brave, he doesn't hide and always makes himself available to his team."

== Personal life ==
Gomes is good friends with former Lille teammates Jonathan David and Timothy Weah, as well as Edon Zhegrova, all three having met playing for the club. He is also close to English midfielder Morgan Gibbs-White, knowing him in the England youth levels when they won both the 2017 U-17 World Cup and the 2023 European Under-21 Championship.

Besides his native English and Portuguese (the language he speaks with his parents), he says that he can understand French well, and is learning to speak it, on account of living in Lille. He is Christian, and stated in 2020: "I'm religious, I'm a Christian, so I'll pray before games and coming on to the pitch I'll always pray."

== Career statistics ==
=== Club ===
As of match played 8 November 2026

Appearances and goals by club, season and competition
Club	Season	League			National cup (Note: Includes FA Cup, Taça de Portugal, Coupe de France)		League cup (Note: Includes EFL Cup)		Europe		Other		Total	
Club	Season	Division	Apps	Goals	Apps	Goals	Apps	Goals	Apps	Goals	Apps	Goals	Apps	Goals
Manchester United	2016–17	Premier League	1	0	0	0	0	0	0	0	0	0	1	0
Manchester United	2017–18	Premier League	0	0	1	0	0	0	0	0	0	0	1	0
Manchester United	2018–19	Premier League	2	0	0	0	0	0	0	0	—		2	0
Manchester United	2019–20	Premier League	2	0	0	0	1	0	3 (Note: Appearances in UEFA Europa League)	0	—		6	0
Manchester United	Total		5	0	1	0	1	0	3	0	0	0	10	0
Manchester United U21	2019–20	—			—		—		—		2 (Note: Appearances in EFL Trophy)	0	2	0
Boavista (loan)	2020–21	Primeira Liga	30	6	2	0	—		—		—		32	6
Lille	2021–22	Ligue 1	24	1	2	1	—		4 (Note: Appearances in UEFA Champions League)	1	0	0	30	3
Lille	2022–23	Ligue 1	36	2	3	1	—		—		—		39	3
Lille	2023–24	Ligue 1	31	0	3	0	—		11 (Note: Appearances in UEFA Europa Conference League)	2	—		45	2
Lille	2024–25	Ligue 1	14	1	0	0	—		6	1	—		20	2
Lille	Total		105	4	8	2	—		21	4	0	0	134	10
Marseille	2025–26	Ligue 1	14	3	2	1	—		4	0	0	0	20	4
Marseille	2026–27	Ligue 1	10	1	0	0	—		3	0	—		13	1
Marseille	Total		24	4	2	1	—		7	0	0	0	33	5
Wolverhampton Wanderers (loan)	2025–26	Premier League	12	0	1	0	—		—		—		13	0
Career total			176	14	14	3	1	0	31	4	2	0	224	21

=== International ===
Appearances and goals by national team and year
National team	Year	Apps	Goals
England	2024	4	0
Total		4	0

== Honours ==
Lille

- Trophée des Champions: 2021

England U17

- FIFA U-17 World Cup: 2017

England U21

- UEFA European Under-21 Championship: 2023

Individual

- Manchester United Premier Cup Most Valuable Player: 2015
- Jimmy Murphy Young Player of the Year: 2016–17
- Ligue 1 top assist provider: 2023–24 (joint)
