= 2023–24 Lille OSC season =

Lille OSC
2023–24 season
- President: Olivier Létang
- Head coach: Paulo Fonseca
- Stadium: Stade Pierre-Mauroy
- Ligue 1: 4th
- Coupe de France: Round of 16
- UEFA Europa Conference League: Quarter-finals
- Top goalscorer: League: Jonathan David (19); All: Jonathan David (26)
- Average home league attendance: 39,943
Home colours	Away colours	Third colours

The 2023–24 season was Lille Olympique Sporting Club' 80th season in existence and 24th consecutive season in Ligue 1. They also competed in the Coupe de France and the UEFA Europa Conference League.

== Players ==
=== First-team squad ===
As of 1 February 2024

Note: Flags indicate national team as defined under FIFA eligibility rules; some limited exceptions apply. Players may hold more than one non-FIFA nationality.

No.	Pos.	Nation	Player
1	GK	ITA	Vito Mannone
4	DF	BRA	Alexsandro
5	DF	SWE	Gabriel Gudmundsson
6	MF	ALG	Nabil Bentaleb
7	MF	ISL	Hákon Arnar Haraldsson
8	MF	ENG	Angel Gomes
9	FW	CAN	Jonathan David
10	MF	FRA	Rémy Cabella
11	FW	ALG	Adam Ounas
12	MF	TUR	Yusuf Yazıcı
14	DF	FRA	Samuel Umtiti
15	DF	FRA	Leny Yoro

No.	Pos.	Nation	Player
16	GK	SVK	Adam Jakubech
17	FW	POR	Ivan Cavaleiro
18	DF	FRA	Bafodé Diakité
19	FW	POR	Tiago Morais
20	MF	ARG	Ignacio Miramón
21	MF	FRA	Benjamin André (captain)
22	DF	POR	Tiago Santos
23	MF	KOS	Edon Zhegrova
24	FW	SRB	Andrej Ilić
28	DF	POR	Rafael Fernandes
30	GK	FRA	Lucas Chevalier
31	DF	BRA	Ismaily

=== Out on loan ===
Note: Flags indicate national team as defined under FIFA eligibility rules; some limited exceptions apply. Players may hold more than one non-FIFA nationality.

No.	Pos.	Nation	Player
—	DF	ALG	Akim Zedadka (on loan at Zaragoza until 30 June 2024)
—	MF	FRA	Ugo Raghouber (on loan at Le Mans until 30 June 2024)
—	FW	GUI	Mohamed Bayo (on loan at Le Havre until 30 June 2024)

No.	Pos.	Nation	Player
—	FW	FRA	Amine Messoussa (on loan at Villefranche until 30 June 2024)
—	FW	FRA	Alan Virginius (on loan at Clermont until 30 June 2024)

== Transfers ==
=== In ===
Pos.	Player	Transferred from	Fee	Date	Source
DF	(Portugal) Tiago Santos	(Portugal) Estoril	€6,500,000	5 July 2023	
MF	(Iceland) Hákon Arnar Haraldsson	(Denmark) Copenhagen	€15,000,000	17 July 2023	
DF	(France) Samuel Umtiti	(Spain) Barcelona	Free	21 July 2023	
MF	(Argentina) Ignacio Miramón	(Argentina) Gimnasia y Esgrima	€6,000,000	10 August 2023	
FW	(Portugal) Ivan Cavaleiro	(England) Fulham	Undisclosed	10 August 2023	
MF	(Algeria) Nabil Bentaleb	(France) Angers	€4,500,000	28 August 2023	
GK	(Italy) Vito Mannone	(France) Lorient	€200,000	29 August 2023	

=== Out ===
Pos.	Player	Transferred to	Fee	Date	Source
FW	(France) Jonathan Bamba	(Spain) Celta Vigo	Free	1 July 2023	
GK	(France) Benoît Costil	(Italy) Salernitana	Free	1 July 2023	
DF	(Portugal) José Fonte	(Portugal) Braga	Free	1 July 2023	
FW	(United States) Timothy Weah	(Italy) Juventus	€11,300,000	1 July 2023	
MF	(France) Jonas Martin	(France) Brest	Contract termination	15 July 2023	
MF	(France) Ugo Raghouger	(France) Le Mans	Loan	16 August 2023	
MF	(Cameroon) Carlos Baleba	(England) Brighton & Hove Albion	€27,000,000	29 August 2023	
FW	(Guinea) Mohamed Bayo	(France) Le Havre	Loan	1 September 2023	

== Pre-season and friendlies ==
Win Draw Loss

19 July 2023 Friendly	Lille	3–1	Dunkerque	Camphin-en-Pévèle
11:00 UTC+2	Messoussa 10'; Cabella 29'; Ferrah 90'		Boissier 85'	Stadium: Complexe Sportif de Luchin

22 July 2023 Friendly	Lille	7–2	Cercle Brugge	Camphin-en-Pévèle
11:00 UTC+2	Haraldsson 8', 14', 42'; David 25', 41', 47', 57'		Denkey 35', 45+3' (pen.)	Stadium: Complexe Sportif de Luchin

26 July 2023 Friendly	Le Havre	2–3	Lille	Camphin-en-Pévèle
17:00 UTC+2	Targhalline 33' (pen.); Salmier 89'		David 19'; Haraldsson 54', 42'	Stadium: Complexe Sportif de Luchin

29 July 2023 Friendly	Empoli	2–1	Lille	Kufstein, Austria
14:00 UTC+2	Piccoli 1'; Caputo 75'	Report	Cabella 61'	Stadium: Kufstein-Arena

5 August 2023 Friendly	Brentford	0–0	Lille	Brentford, England
16:00 UTC+1		Report		Stadium: Brentford Community Stadium; Referee: Michael Salisbury

== Competitions ==
=== Overall record ===
Competition	First match	Last match	Starting round	Final position	Record							
Competition	First match	Last match	Starting round	Final position	Pld	W	D	L	GF	GA	GD	Win %
Ligue 1	11 August 2023	19 May 2024	Matchday 1	4th	34	16	11	7	52	34	+18	47.06
Coupe de France	6 January 2024	7 February 2024	Round of 64	Round of 16	3	2	0	1	14	2	+12	66.67
UEFA Europa Conference League	24 August 2023	18 April 2024	Play-off round	Quarter-finals	12	7	4	1	20	8	+12	58.33
Total					49	25	15	9	86	44	+42	51.02

Source: Soccerway

=== League table ===
Pos	Team	Pld	W	D	L	GF	GA	GD	Pts	Qualification or relegation
2	Monaco	34	20	7	7	68	42	+26	67	Qualification for the Champions League league phase
3	Brest	34	17	10	7	53	34	+19	61	Qualification for the Champions League league phase
4	Lille	34	16	11	7	52	34	+18	59	Qualification for the Champions League third qualifying round
5	Nice	34	15	10	9	40	29	+11	55	Qualification for the Europa League league phase (Note: Since the 2023–24 Coupe de France winners, Paris Saint-Germain, qualified for the Champions League via league position, the Europa League berth awarded to the cup winners was passed to the sixth-placed team and the Conference League berth was passed to the seventh-placed team.)
6	Lyon	34	16	5	13	49	55	−6	53	Qualification for the Europa League league phase

Source: Ligue 1
Rules for classification: 1) Points; 2) Goal difference; 3) Head-to-head points; 4) Head-to-head goal difference; 5) Head-to-head goals scored; 6) Head-to-head away goals scored; 7) Goals scored; 8) Away goals scored; 9) Fair-play points (Note: Head-to-head record is used only after all the matches between the teams in question have been played).

==== Results summary ====
Overall								Home						Away					
Pld	W	D	L	GF	GA	GD	Pts	W	D	L	GF	GA	GD	W	D	L	GF	GA	GD
34	16	11	7	52	34	+18	59	11	4	2	34	14	+20	5	7	5	18	20	−2

Source: Ligue 1

==== Results by round ====
Round	1	2	3	4	5	6	7	8	9	10	11	12	13	14	15	16	17	18	19	20	21	22	23	24	25	26	27	28	29	30	31	32	33	34
Ground	A	H	A	H	A	H	A	A	H	H	A	H	A	H	A	H	A	H	A	H	A	H	A	A	H	A	H	H	A	H	A	H	A	H
Result	D	W	L	W	D	L	W	D	W	W	D	D	W	W	D	D	L	W	D	W	L	W	L	W	D	D	W	W	L	W	W	L	W	D
Position	9	5	10	6	6	11	7	7	4	4	5	4	4	4	4	4	5	5	5	4	5	4	5	4	4	4	4	4	4	4	4	4	3	4

Source: Ligue 1
A = Away; H = Home; W = Win; D = Draw; L = Loss

==== Matches ====
The league fixtures were unveiled on 29 June 2023.

11 August 2023 1	Nice	1–1	Lille	Nice
21:00 CEST (UTC+2)	Laborde 19', (yellow card) 45+2'; Atal (yellow card) 35'; Thuram (yellow card) 55'	Report	Haraldsson (yellow card) 38'; Santos (yellow card) 45+3'; Diakité 90+4'	Stadium: Allianz Riviera; Attendance: 29,436; Referee: François Letexier

20 August 2023 2	Lille	2–0	Nantes	Villeneuve-d'Ascq
13:00 CEST (UTC+2)	David 66'; Alexsandro (red card) 78'; Ounas 90+4'	Report	Pallois (yellow card) 32'; Castelletto (yellow card) 47'	Stadium: Stade Pierre-Mauroy; Attendance: 34,536; Referee: Pierre Gaillouste

27 August 2023 3	Lorient	4–1	Lille	Lorient
17:05 CEST (UTC+2)	Abergel 9'; Ponceau 10'; Pagis (yellow card) 49'; Doucouré (yellow card) 57'; Faivre 62'; Le Goff 67'	Report	Yoro (yellow card) 15'; Diakité (yellow card) 27'; André (yellow card) 51'; David 55'; Yazıcı (yellow card) 87'	Stadium: Stade du Moustoir; Attendance: 15,101; Referee: Willy Delajod

3 September 2023 4	Lille	1–0	Montpellier	Villeneuve-d'Ascq
17:05 CEST (UTC+2)	Yazıcı 1'; Gomes (yellow card) 49'; Alexsandro (yellow card) 72'	Report	Omeragić (yellow card) 90'	Stadium: Stade Pierre-Mauroy; Attendance: 35,298; Referee: Benoît Millot

16 September 2023 5	Rennes	2–2	Lille	Rennes
17:00 CEST (UTC+2)	Matić (yellow card) 33'; Assignon 74'; Salah 89'	Report	Yazıcı (yellow card) 30'; Yoro 33'; Diakité (yellow card) 51', (goal) 62'; David (yellow card) 86'; Gomes (yellow card) 88'	Stadium: Roazhon Park; Attendance: 28,178; Referee: Jérôme Brisard

26 September 2023 6	Lille	1–2	Reims	Villeneuve-d'Ascq
21:00 CEST (UTC+2)	Santos (yellow card) 62'; André 78'	Report	Daramy 12'; Nakamura 16', (yellow card) 53'; Foket (yellow card) 65'	Stadium: Stade Pierre-Mauroy; Attendance: 33,075; Referee: Eric Wattellier

1 October 2023 7	Le Havre	0–2	Lille	Le Havre
15:00 CEST (UTC+2)		Report	Zhegrova 40'; Salmier 52' (o.g.)	Stadium: Stade Océane; Attendance: 21,919; Referee: Bastien Dechepy

8 October 2023 8	Lens	1–1	Lille	Lens
17:05 CEST (UTC+2)	Medina (yellow card) 17'; Machado 70'; Wahi (yellow card) 82'	Report	Cavaleiro (yellow card) 20'; André 45+3'; Alexsandro (yellow card) 68'; Gomes (yellow card) 82'; Yoro (yellow card) 90'	Stadium: Stade Bollaert-Delelis; Attendance: 37,223; Referee: Benoît Millot

22 October 2023 9	Lille	1–0	Brest	Villeneuve-d'Ascq
15:00 CEST (UTC+2)	Yazıcı 6'; André (yellow card) 45+4'; Haraldsson (yellow card) 78'	Report	Le Douaron (yellow card) 41'; Camblan (yellow card) 79'; Brahimi (yellow card) 84'	Stadium: Stade Pierre-Mauroy; Attendance: 34,358; Referee: Hakim Ben El Hadj

29 October 2023 10	Lille	2–0	Monaco	Villeneuve-d'Ascq
15:00 CET (UTC+1)	Cavaleiro 32'; Diakité 42'; Yazıcı (yellow card) 67'	Report	Singo (yellow card) 48'; Zakaria (yellow card) 50'	Stadium: Stade Pierre-Mauroy; Attendance: 40,046; Referee: Clément Turpin

4 November 2023 11	Marseille	0–0	Lille	Marseille
21:00 CET (UTC+1)	Harit (yellow card) 42'; Gigot (yellow card) 53'	Report	André (yellow card) 27'; Bentaleb (yellow card) 70'; Yazıcı (yellow card) 73'	Stadium: Stade Vélodrome; Attendance: 63,674; Referee: Stéphanie Frappart

12 November 2023 12	Lille	1–1	Toulouse	Villeneuve-d'Ascq
15:00 CET (UTC+1)	Yoro 30'; Bentaleb (yellow card) 38'; David (yellow card) 47'; Alexsandro (yellow card) 64'	Report	Spierings (yellow card) 61'; Dallinga 65', (yellow card) 82'; Nicolaisen (yellow card) 90+2'; Cissoko (yellow card) 90+6'	Stadium: Stade Pierre-Mauroy; Attendance: 34,959; Referee: Mathieu Vernice

26 November 2023 13	Lyon	0–2	Lille	Décines-Charpieu
20:45 CET (UTC+1)	Baldé (yellow card) 66'; Akouokou (yellow card) 72'	Report	Gudmundsson (yellow card) 13'; David 27'; Santos 32', (yellow card) 32'	Stadium: Parc Olympique Lyonnais; Attendance: 40,029; Referee: Eric Wattellier

3 December 2023 14	Lille	2–0	Metz	Villeneuve-d'Ascq
17:05 CET (UTC+1)	Yazıcı 45+2'; David 45+6' (pen.)	Report	Elisor (penalty missed) 29'; Camara (penalty missed) 55'	Stadium: Stade Pierre-Mauroy; Attendance: 38,065; Referee: Gaël Angoula

10 December 2023 15	Clermont	0–0	Lille	Clermont-Ferrand
15:00 CET (UTC+1)	Rashani (yellow card) 68'; Zeffane (yellow card) 82'	Report	Yoro (yellow card) 34'; Yazıcı (yellow card) 90+2'	Stadium: Stade Gabriel Montpied; Attendance: 8,789; Referee: Florent Batta

17 December 2023 16	Lille	1–1	Paris Saint-Germain	Villeneuve-d'Ascq
20:45 CET (UTC+1)	Diakité (yellow card) 66'; David 90+4'	Report	Ugarte (yellow card) 18'; Mbappé 66' (pen.)	Stadium: Stade Pierre-Mauroy; Attendance: 47,993; Referee: Willy Delajod

20 December 2023 17	Strasbourg	2–1	Lille	Strasbourg
21:00 CET (UTC+1)	Yoro 41' (o.g.); Sylla (yellow card) 45'; Mwanga 76'	Report	Sylla 20' (o.g.); André (yellow card) 32'; Zhegrova (yellow card) 62'	Stadium: Stade de la Meinau; Attendance: 25,373; Referee: Clément Turpin

14 January 2024 18	Lille	3–0	Lorient	Villeneuve-d'Ascq
13:00 CET (UTC+1)	David 38'; André (yellow card) 40'; Cabella 90'; Zhegrova 90+2'	Report	Le Bris (yellow card) 30'; Bakayoko (yellow card) 41'; Pelon (yellow card) 55'; Touré (yellow card) 88'	Stadium: Stade Pierre-Mauroy; Attendance: 35,204; Referee: Pierre Gaillouste

28 January 2024 19	Montpellier	0–0	Lille	Montpellier
13:00 CET (UTC+1)	Jullien (yellow card) 26'; Savanier (yellow card) 61'; Khazri (yellow card) 62'; Coulibaly (yellow card) 63'	Report	Bouaddi (yellow card) 37' (yellow-red card) 45+2'; Santos (yellow card) 66'	Stadium: Stade de la Mosson; Attendance: 12,575; Referee: Hakim Ben El Hadj

4 February 2024 20	Lille	4–0	Clermont	Villeneuve-d'Ascq
15:00 CET (UTC+1)	David 10', 38'; André 25'; Zhegrova 40'	Report	Nicholson (yellow card) 25'	Stadium: Stade Pierre-Mauroy; Attendance: 38,597; Referee: Bastien Dechepy

10 February 2024 21	Paris Saint-Germain	3–1	Lille	Paris
21:00 CET (UTC+1)	Ramos 10'; Alexsandro 17' (o.g.); Ugarte (yellow card) 35'; Mukiele (yellow card) 74'; Kolo Muani 80'	Report	Yazıcı 6'; André (yellow card) 16'; Ismaily (yellow card) 32'; Alexsandro (yellow card) 52'	Stadium: Parc des Princes; Attendance: 47,716; Referee: François Letexier

17 February 2024 22	Lille	3–0	Le Havre	Villeneuve-d'Ascq
17:00 CET (UTC+1)	David 14', 44', 49', (penalty missed) 49'; Bentaleb (yellow card) 36'; Haraldsson (yellow card) 68'	Report	Lloris (yellow card) 18'; Touré (yellow card) 65'; Opéri (yellow card) 83'	Stadium: Stade Pierre-Mauroy; Attendance: 40,317; Referee: Jérémie Pignard

25 February 2024 23	Toulouse	3–1	Lille	Toulouse
15:00 CET (UTC+1)	Magri (yellow card) 34'; Mawissa 49'; Sierro 60' (pen.), (yellow card) 70'; Dallinga 66'	Report	Haraldsson 45'	Stadium: Stadium de Toulouse; Attendance: 24,110; Referee: Mathieu Vernice

2 March 2024 24	Reims	0–1	Lille	Reims
17:00 CET (UTC+1)	Koudou (yellow card) 6'; Teuma (yellow card) 36'; De Smet (yellow card) 59'	Report	Gudmundsson (yellow card) 48'; David 56'; Chevalier (yellow card) 90+6'	Stadium: Stade Auguste-Delaune; Attendance: 16,452; Referee: Jérémy Stinat

10 March 2024 25	Lille	2–2	Rennes	Villeneuve-d'Ascq
17:05 CET (UTC+1)	Bentaleb (yellow card) 21'; Diakité (yellow card) 26'; Yoro (yellow card) 53'; Gomes (yellow card) 80'; Dago (yellow card) 83'; David 84', 90+2'	Report	Blas 1', (yellow card) 50'; Truffert (yellow card) 8'; Kalimuendo 20'	Stadium: Stade Pierre-Mauroy; Attendance: 40,383; Referee: Benoît Millot

17 March 2024 26	Brest	1–1	Lille	Brest
13:00 CET (UTC+1)	Pereira Lage (yellow card) 27'; Lees-Melou (yellow card) 57'; Satriano 80'; Locko (yellow card) 88'	Report	David 67'	Stadium: Stade Francis-Le Blé; Attendance: 14,774; Referee: Clément Turpin

29 March 2024 27	Lille	2–1	Lens	Villeneuve-d'Ascq
21:00 CET (UTC+1)	Zhegrova 9', 60', (yellow card) 64'; André (yellow card) 52'; Bentaleb (yellow card) 88'	Report	Medina (yellow card) 35'; Wahi (yellow card) 64', (goal) 78'; Costa (yellow card) 88'	Stadium: Stade Pierre-Mauroy; Attendance: 48,233; Referee: Willy Delajod

5 April 2024 28	Lille	3–1	Marseille	Villeneuve-d'Ascq
21:00 CEST (UTC+2)	Santos (yellow card) 21'; David 54' (pen.); Cabella 71'; Gudmundsson 84'	Report	Harit (yellow card) 27'; Gigot (yellow card) 52'; Merlin (yellow card) 57'; Kondogbia (yellow card) 70'; Balerdi (yellow card) 77'; Ismaily 81' (o.g.); Veretout (yellow card) 90+6'	Stadium: Stade Pierre-Mauroy; Attendance: 46,864; Referee: Bastien Dechepy

21 April 2024 30	Lille	1–0	Strasbourg	Villeneuve-d'Ascq
15:00 CEST (UTC+2)	David 13'; Alexsandro (yellow card) 23'; Santos (yellow card) 90+5'	Report	Sow (yellow card) 44'; Diarra (yellow card) 59'; Sylla (yellow card) 90+7'	Stadium: Stade Pierre-Mauroy; Attendance: 40,381; Referee: Benoît Millot

24 April 2024 29	Monaco	1–0	Lille	Monaco
19:00 CEST (UTC+2)	Akliouche (yellow card) 38'; Fofana 62'	Report	David (yellow card) 54'; Bouaddi (yellow card) 67'	Stadium: Stade Louis II; Attendance: 7,069; Referee: Clément Turpin
Note: The match was originally scheduled for 14 April 2024, but was postponed due to Lille's progression in the UEFA Europa Conference League.

28 April 2024 31	Metz	1–2	Lille	Longeville-lès-Metz
13:00 CEST (UTC+2)	Mikautadze 23' (pen.); Lamkel Zé (yellow card) 76'	Report	Ismaily 31'; David (yellow card) 37'; Yazıcı 44'; Bentaleb (yellow card) 51'	Stadium: Stade Saint-Symphorien; Attendance: 24,720; Referee: Stéphanie Frappart

6 May 2024 32	Lille	3–4	Lyon	Villeneuve-d'Ascq
21:00 CEST (UTC+2)	Diakité 21', 85'; Gomes (yellow card) 28'; Zhegrova 37'; Haraldsson (yellow card) 80'; Yoro (yellow card) 90+4'	Report	Nuamah (yellow card) 35'; Benrahma 66'; Fofana 82'; Lacazette 89'; Baldé 90+2'	Stadium: Stade Pierre-Mauroy; Attendance: 45,227; Referee: Benoît Bastien

12 May 2024 33	Nantes	1–2	Lille	Nantes
21:00 CEST (UTC+2)	Mohamed (yellow card) 33'; Lafont (yellow card) 44'; Abline 54'; Pallois (yellow card) 60'; Sissoko (yellow card) 74'	Report	David 8', 11'; Zhegrova (yellow card) 44'; Bentaleb (yellow card) 81'	Stadium: Stade de la Beaujoire; Attendance: 26,529; Referee: Eric Wattellier

19 May 2024 34	Lille	2–2	Nice	Villeneuve-d'Ascq
21:00 CEST (UTC+2)	Haraldsson 54', (yellow card) 58'; Alexsandro (yellow card) 61'; André 72', (yellow card) 90+1'; Zhegrova (red card) 90+8'	Report	Laborde 10'; Claude-Maurice (yellow card) 65'; Thuram (yellow card) 76'; Lotomba 90+4'; Bułka (yellow card) 90+10'	Stadium: Stade Pierre-Mauroy; Attendance: 45,488; Referee: Willy Delajod
Note: Zhegrova received a red card after already being substituted out of the match.

=== Coupe de France ===
6 January 2024 Round of 64	Lille	12–0	(Martinique) Golden Lion	Villeneuve-d'Ascq
15:30 CET (UTC+1)	Yazıcı 11', 45'; David 25', 36', 75'; Zhegrova 33', 41', 42'; Santos 57'; Haraldsson 64' (pen.), 78'; Messoussa 62'	Report		Stadium: Stade Pierre-Mauroy; Attendance: 13,060; Referee: Thomas Léonard

21 January 2024 Round of 32	Racing Club	0–1	Lille	Chambly
17:30 CET (UTC+1)	Costa (yellow card) 70'	Report	Haraldsson 33'	Stadium: Stade Walter-Luzi; Attendance: 2,517; Referee: Eric Wattellier

7 February 2024 Round of 16	Lyon	2–1	Lille	Décines-Charpieu
18:30 CET (UTC+1)	Orban 39'; Cherki 46'; Tagliafico (yellow card) 65'; Ćaleta-Car (yellow card) 68'	Report	Alexsandro 54'	Stadium: Parc Olympique Lyonnais; Attendance: 29,085; Referee: Benoît Millot

=== UEFA Europa Conference League ===
==== Play-off round ====
The draw for the play-off round was held on 7 August 2023.

24 August 2023 First leg	Lille (France)	2–1	(Croatia) Rijeka	Villeneuve-d'Ascq, France
20:00 CEST (UTC+2)	André (yellow card) 15'; Zhegrova 43', (yellow card) 52'; Yoro 89'	Report	Pašalić 24'; Mitrović (yellow card) 52'; Labrović (yellow card) 81'	Stadium: Stade Pierre-Mauroy; Attendance: 22,189; Referee: Atilla Karaoğlan (Turkey)

31 August 2023 Second leg	Rijeka (Croatia)	1–1 (a.e.t.) (2–3 agg.)	(France) Lille	Rijeka, Croatia
18:00 CEST (UTC+2)	Fruk (yellow card) 37'; Galešić (yellow card) 45+1'; Ivanović (yellow card) 49'; Smolčić 58', (yellow card) 120+1'; Vukčević (yellow card) 111'; Obregón (yellow card) 114'	Report	David (yellow card) 8', (goal) 109'; Diakité (yellow card) 99'	Stadium: Stadion Rujevica; Attendance: 7,852; Referee: Luís Godinho (Portugal)

==== Group stage ====
The draw for the group stage was held on 1 September 2023.

Pos	Team	Pld	W	D	L	GF	GA	GD	Pts	Qualification	LOSC	SLO	LJU	KÍ
1	(France) Lille	6	4	2	0	10	2	+8	14	Advance to round of 16	—	2–1	2–0	3–0
2	(Slovakia) Slovan Bratislava	6	3	1	2	8	7	+1	10	Advance to knockout round play-offs	1–1	—	1–2	2–1
3	(Slovenia) Olimpija Ljubljana	6	2	0	4	4	9	−5	6		0–2	0–1	—	2–0
4	(Faroe Islands) KÍ	6	1	1	4	5	9	−4	4		0–0	1–2	3–0	—

Source: UEFA
Rules for classification: Group stage tiebreakers

20 September 2023 1	Lille (France)	2–0	(Slovenia) Olimpija Ljubljana	Villeneuve-d'Ascq, France
16:30 CEST (UTC+2)	David 43' (pen.); Gomes (yellow card) 53'; Yazıcı 90+4'	Report	Rui Pedro (yellow card) 35'; Elšnik (yellow card) 39'	Stadium: Stade Pierre-Mauroy; Attendance: 13,817; Referee: Joey Kooij (Netherlands)
Note: The match was played on a Wednesday instead of a Thursday to allow enough time for the stadium's pitch to be mended prior to hosting a Rugby World Cup match.

5 October 2023 2	KÍ (Faroe Islands)	0–0	(France) Lille	Tórshavn, Faroe Islands
17:45 WEST (UTC+1)	Danielsen (yellow card) 54'; Frederiksberg (yellow card) 83'	Report	Miramón (yellow card) 90+3'	Stadium: Tórsvøllur; Attendance: 2,191; Referee: Elchin Masiyev (Azerbaijan)
Note: The match was played at the Tórsvøllur in Tórshavn, instead of KÍ's regular stadium, the Við Djúpumýrar in Klaksvík, which did not meet UEFA requirements.

26 October 2023 3	Lille (France)	2–1	(Slovakia) Slovan Bratislava	Villeneuve-d'Ascq, France
18:45 CEST (UTC+2)	Diakité (yellow card) 62'; Yazıcı 68'; Bentaleb (yellow card) 78'; Cabella 82'	Report	Čavrić 23'; Kucka (yellow card) 75'; Lovat (red card) 85'; Wimmer (yellow card) 90+5'	Stadium: Stade Pierre-Mauroy; Attendance: 19,610; Referee: Luca Pairetto (Italy)

9 November 2023 4	Slovan Bratislava (Slovakia)	1–1	(France) Lille	Bratislava, Slovakia
21:00 CET (UTC+1)	Savvidis (yellow card) 46'; Čavrić 81'; Barseghyan (yellow card) 84'; Weiss (yellow card) 90+1'; Bajrić (yellow card) 90+7'	Report	Gomes 53'; Bentaleb (yellow card) 90+3'	Stadium: Tehelné pole Attendance: 21,544; Referee: Gergő Bogár (Hungary)

30 November 2023 5	Olimpija Ljubljana (Slovenia)	0–2	(France) Lille	Ljubljana, Slovenia
18:45 CET (UTC+1)	Brest (yellow card) 41'; Rui Pedro (yellow card) 60'; Bristrić (yellow card) 90+5'	Report	Cabella 15'; Santos (yellow card) 38'; Umtiti (yellow card) 41'; Yazıcı 75'; Haraldsson (yellow card) 86'	Stadium: Stožice Stadium; Attendance: 4,053; Referee: Sven Jablonski (Germany)

14 December 2023 6	Lille (France)	3–0	(Faroe Islands) KÍ	Villeneuve-d'Ascq, France
21:00 CET (UTC+1)	Yazıcı 29' (pen.); Bentaleb (yellow card) 39'; Gomes 87' (pen.); Zhegrova 90+6' (pen.)	Report	Vatnsdal (yellow card) 18'; Forren (yellow card) 28'; Danielsen (yellow card) 61' (yellow-red card) 84'; Joensen (yellow card) 77'; Andreasen (yellow card) 85' (yellow-red card) 90+4'	Stadium: Stade Pierre-Mauroy; Attendance: 20,061; Referee: António Nobre (Portugal)

==== Knockout phase ====
===== Round of 16 =====
The draw for the round of 16 was held on 23 February 2024.

7 March 2024 First leg	Sturm Graz (Austria)	0–3	(France) Lille	Graz, Austria
18:45 CET (UTC+1)	Wüthrich (yellow card) 69'	Report	David 28', 51'; Zhegrova 71'; Bouaddi (yellow card) 74'	Stadium: Liebenauer Stadium; Attendance: 13,825; Referee: Bartosz Frankowski (Poland)

14 March 2024 Second leg	Lille (France)	1–1 (4–1 agg.)	(Austria) Sturm Graz	Villeneuve-d'Ascq, France
21:00 CET (UTC+1)	Santos 43'	Report	Biereth 45+1'	Stadium: Stade Pierre-Mauroy; Attendance: 17,888; Referee: Matej Jug (Slovenia)

===== Quarter-finals =====
The draw for the quarter-finals was held on 15 March 2024.

11 April 2024 First leg	Aston Villa (England)	2–1	(France) Lille	Birmingham, England
20:00 BST (UTC+1)	Watkins 13'; Douglas Luiz (yellow card) 49'; McGinn 56'; Tielemans (yellow card) 77'; Martínez (yellow card) 90+4'	Report	Diakité 84'	Stadium: Villa Park; Attendance: 38,638; Referee: Espen Eskås (Norway)

18 April 2024 Second leg	Lille (France)	2–1 (a.e.t.) (3–3 agg.) (3–4 p)	(England) Aston Villa	Villeneuve-d'Ascq, France
18:45 CEST (UTC+2)	Yazıcı 15'; Bentaleb (yellow card) 42'; André (yellow card) 44', (goal) 68'; Santos (yellow card) 61'; Gomes (yellow card) 117'	Report	Zaniolo (yellow card) 21'; Martínez (yellow card) 39' (yellow card) PSO; Digne (yellow card) 61'; Rogers (yellow card) 76'; Cash 87'; Durán (yellow card) 90+1'; Watkins (yellow card) 109'	Stadium: Stade Pierre-Mauroy; Attendance: 47,093; Referee: Ivan Kružliak (Slovakia)
	Penalties
	Bentaleb (penalty missed); David (penalty scored); Gomes (penalty scored); Cabella (penalty scored); André (penalty missed)		(penalty scored) Tielemans; (penalty scored) Watkins; (penalty scored) Cash; (penalty missed) Bailey; (penalty scored) Douglas Luiz

== Statistics ==
=== Appearances and goals ===
No.	Pos	Nat	Player	Total		Ligue 1		Coupe de France		UEFA Europa Conference League	
No.	Pos	Nat	Player	Apps	Goals	Apps	Goals	Apps	Goals	Apps	Goals
Goalkeepers
1	GK	(Italy) ITA	Vito Mannone	7	0	1+1	0	2	0	3	0
16	GK	(Slovakia) SVK	Adam Jakubech	0	0	0	0	0	0	0	0
30	GK	(France) FRA	Lucas Chevalier	43	0	33	0	1	0	9	0
Defenders
4	DF	(Brazil) BRA	Alexsandro	42	1	24+5	0	2	1	6+5	0
5	DF	(Sweden) SWE	Gabriel Gudmundsson	38	1	14+11	1	1+1	0	9+2	0
14	DF	(France) FRA	Samuel Umtiti	13	0	2+4	0	1	0	5+1	0
15	DF	(France) FRA	Leny Yoro	44	3	30+2	2	3	0	7+2	1
18	DF	(France) FRA	Bafodé Diakité	28	6	19+2	5	0	0	6+1	1
22	DF	(Portugal) POR	Tiago Santos	43	3	26+3	1	2+1	1	11	1
31	DF	(Brazil) BRA	Ismaily	39	1	28+2	1	3	0	5+1	0
Midfielders
6	MF	(Algeria) ALG	Nabil Bentaleb	34	0	23+3	0	1	0	6+1	0
7	MF	(Iceland) ISL	Hákon Arnar Haraldsson	38	5	15+11	2	2	3	8+2	0
8	MF	(England) ENG	Angel Gomes	45	2	29+2	0	2+1	0	6+5	2
10	MF	(France) FRA	Rémy Cabella	41	4	14+16	2	0	0	7+4	2
12	MF	(Turkey) TUR	Yusuf Yazıcı	42	12	16+11	5	1+2	2	7+5	5
20	MF	(Argentina) ARG	Ignacio Miramón	4	0	1+1	0	0+1	0	0+1	0
21	MF	(France) FRA	Benjamin André	45	5	29+1	4	3	0	10+2	1
23	MF	(Kosovo) KOS	Edon Zhegrova	47	12	25+8	6	3	3	8+3	3
32	MF	(France) FRA	Ayyoub Bouaddi	18	0	1+8	0	1+2	0	5+1	0
35	MF	(France) FRA	Adame Faïz	1	0	0	0	0	0	0+1	0
Forwards
9	FW	(Canada) CAN	Jonathan David	47	26	30+4	19	3	3	7+3	4
11	FW	(Algeria) ALG	Adam Ounas	22	1	3+14	1	1	0	2+2	0
17	FW	(Portugal) POR	Ivan Cavaleiro	23	1	9+8	1	0	0	2+4	0
19	FW	(Portugal) POR	Tiago Morais	4	0	0+3	0	0+1	0	0	0
24	FW	(Serbia) SRB	Andrej Ilić	3	0	0+2	0	0+1	0	0	0
33	FW	(France) FRA	Trévis Dago	4	0	0+4	0	0	0	0	0
34	FW	(France) FRA	Aaron Malouda	3	0	0+1	0	0+1	0	0+1	0
38	FW	(France) FRA	Ichem Ferrah	2	0	0+1	0	0	0	0+1	0
42	FW	(Burkina Faso) BFA	Joffrey Bazié	1	0	0	0	0	0	0+1	0
Players transferred out during the season
3	DF	(Portugal) POR	Tiago Djaló	0	0	0	0	0	0	0	0
13	DF	(Algeria) ALG	Akim Zedadka	4	0	0	0	1+1	0	1+1	0
26	FW	(France) FRA	Alan Virginius	5	0	1+1	0	0	0	1+2	0
37	FW	(France) FRA	Amine Messoussa	2	1	0	0	0+1	1	1	0

Source: Competitions
