= Tiago Santos =

Portuguese footballer (born 2002)

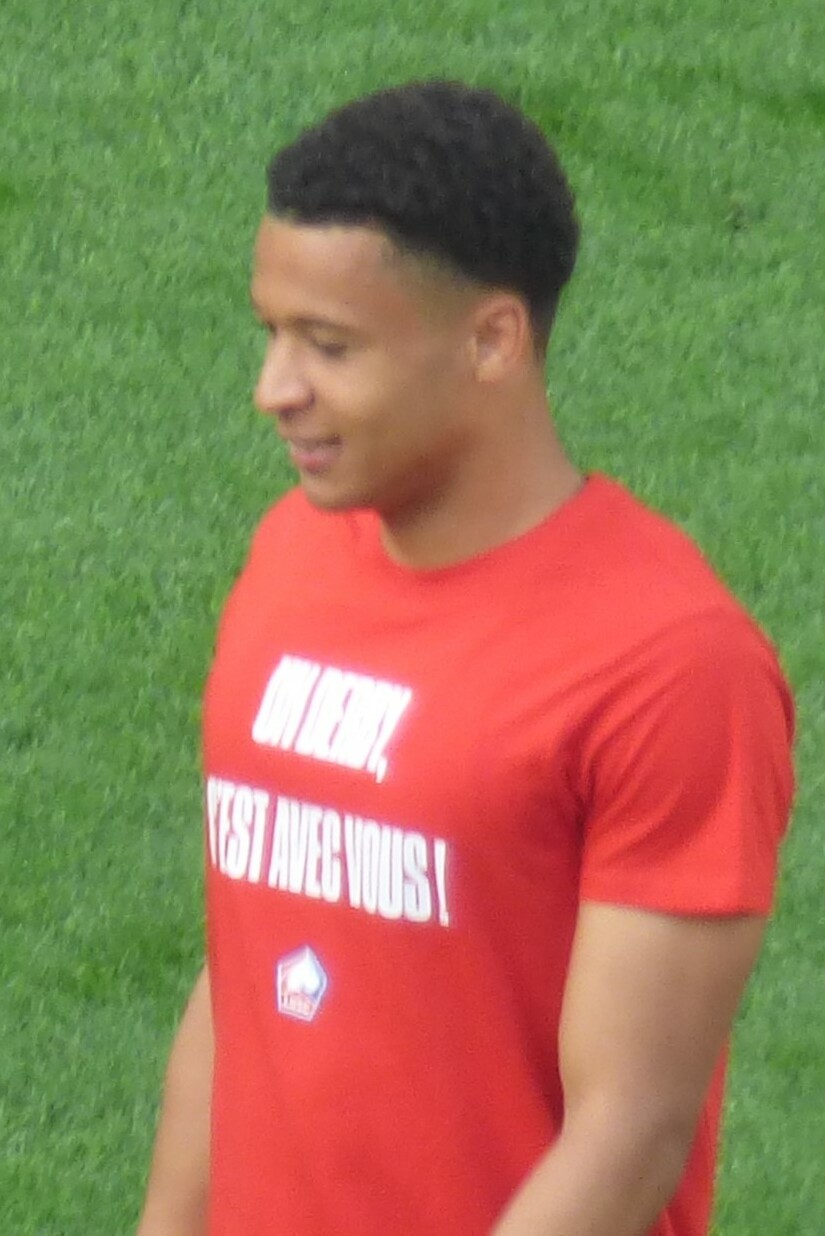
- Santos with Lille in 2023

Personal information
- Full name: Tiago Carvalho Santos
- Date of birth: 23 July 2002 (age 24)
- Place of birth: Lisbon, Portugal
- Height: 1.75 m (5 ft 9 in)
- Position: Right-back

Team information
- Current team: Lille
- Number: 22

Youth career
- 2009–2017: Sporting CP
- 2017–2018: Oeiras
- 2018–2019: Sacavenense
- 2019–2021: Sporting CP
- 2021–2022: Estoril

Senior career*
Years	Team	Apps	(Gls)
2022–2023	Estoril	30	(0)
2023–	Lille	56	(3)

International career^{‡}
2023–	Portugal U21	5	(0)
- * Club domestic league appearances and goals as of 19:15, 10 October 2026 (UTC) ‡ National team caps and goals as of 11 October 2024

Tiago Carvalho Santos (born 23 July 2002) is a Portuguese professional footballer who plays as a right-back for Ligue 1 club Lille.

== Club career ==
=== Estoril ===
Santos spent the majority of his youth career in the academy of Sporting CP, with stints at the academies of Oeiras, Sacavenense, and moving to the U23 side of Estoril in 2021. On 9 July 2022, he was promoted to Estoril's senior side for the 2022–23 season.

Santos made his professional and Primeira Liga debut as a starter in a 2–2 draw with Rio Ave on 19 August 2022, in which he assisted the opening goal of the match. He received the Young Player of the Month award in Primeira Liga for April 2023. Santos finished the 2022–23 season with 5 assists in 30 league appearances for Estoril.

During the summer 2023 transfer window, Santos attracted interest from Benfica, who had an offer in the region of €5 million accepted by Estoril for the right-back. However, Sporting CP invoked an "anti-rival" clause inserted into Santos' contract when he joined Estoril, which stated that the Lions were owed €20 million if the player was sold to Benfica or Porto; for that reason, the move collapsed.

=== Lille ===
On 5 July 2023, Santos signed a five-year contract with Ligue 1 club Lille, who paid €6.5 million for the right-back.

He made his debut for Les Dogues on 11 August, starting in a 1–1 draw away at Nice in the 2023–24 Ligue 1's opening match. Thirteen days later, Santos made his debut in European competitions, starting in a 2–1 home victory over HNK Rijeka in the play-off round of the UEFA Europa Conference League. On 26 November 2023, Santos scored his first professional goal, from outside the penalty box, in a 2–0 league victory away to Lyon.

== International career ==
Born in Portugal, Santos is of Angolan descent through his father. He made his international debut for the Portugal U21s on 8 September 2023, starting in a 3–0 home victory over Andorra in a qualifying match for the 2025 UEFA European Under-21 Championship.

He was called up to the senior Portugal national team for the first time for the Nations League games against Croatia and Scotland in September 2024.

== Career statistics ==
=== Club ===
As of match played 10 October 2026

Appearances and goals by club, season and competition
Club	Season	League			National cup (Note: Includes Taça de Portugal, Coupe de France)		League cup (Note: Includes Taça da Liga)		Europe		Total	
Club	Season	Division	Apps	Goals	Apps	Goals	Apps	Goals	Apps	Goals	Apps	Goals
Estoril	2022–23	Primeira Liga	30	0	2	0	2	0	—		34	0
Lille	2023–24	Ligue 1	28	1	3	1	—		11 (Note: Appearances in UEFA Europa Conference League)	1	41	3
Lille	2024–25	Ligue 1	7	0	0	0	—		5 (Note: Appearances in UEFA Champions League)	0	12	0
Lille	2025–26	Ligue 1	15	0	2	0	—		11 (Note: Appearances in UEFA Europa League)	0	28	0
Lille	2026–27	Ligue 1	6	1	0	0	—		1	0	7	2
Lille	Total		56	3	5	1	—		28	1	89	5
Career total			86	3	6	1	2	0	28	1	124	5
