= Joffrey Bazié =

Burkinabe footballer (born 2003)

Personal information
- Full name: Joffrey Nino Negawabloua Bazié
- Date of birth: 27 October 2003 (age 23)
- Place of birth: Bobo-Dioulasso, Burkina Faso
- Position: Winger

Youth career
- Salitas

Senior career*
Years	Team	Apps	(Gls)
2021	Salitas		
2022–2024	Lille B	38	(5)
2024	Lille	0	(0)
2024–2025	Paços de Ferreira	3	(0)

International career
2021	Burkina Faso U20	4	(1)
2022	Burkina Faso	1	(0)
- * Club domestic league appearances and goals as of 8 February 2025

Joffrey Nino Negawabloua Bazié (born 27 October 2003) is a Burkinabé professional footballer who plays as a winger.

== Club career ==
Bazié joined French Ligue 1 club Lille in January 2022. He made his only appearance for the club on 7 March 2024 in a 3–0 win against Sturm Graz.

In July 2024, Bazié joined Liga Portugal 2 side Paços de Ferreira. In September 2025, after making just three appearances for the club, his contract was terminated by mutual agreement.

== International career ==
In March 2022, Bazié received his first call-up to Burkina Faso national team for friendly matches against Kosovo and Belgium. He made his international debut on 29 March 2022 in a 3–0 defeat against Belgium.

== Career statistics ==
=== Club ===
As of match played 7 March 2024

Appearances and goals by club, season and competition
Club	Season	League			Cup		Continental		Total	
Club	Season	Division	Apps	Goals	Apps	Goals	Apps	Goals	Apps	Goals
Salitas	2020–21	Burkinabé Premier League					3 (Note: Appearances in CAF Confederation Cup)	0	3	0
Lille II	2021–22	Championnat National 3	8	1	—		—		8	1
Lille II	2022–23	Championnat National 3	17	3	—		—		17	3
Lille II	2023–24	Championnat National 3	5	1	—		—		5	1
Lille II	Total		30	5	—		—		30	5
Lille	2022–23	Ligue 1	0	0	0	0	0	0	0	0
Lille	2023–24	Ligue 1	0	0	0	0	1 (Note: Appearances in UEFA Europa Conference League)	0	1	0
Lille	Total		0	0	0	0	1	0	1	0
Career total			30	5	0	0	4	0	34	5

=== International ===
As of match played 29 March 2022

Appearances and goals by national team and year
National team	Year	Apps	Goals
Burkina Faso	2022	1	0
Total		1	0
