= 2022–23 Lille OSC season =

Lille
2022–23 season
- President: Olivier Létang
- Head coach: Paulo Fonseca
- Stadium: Stade Pierre-Mauroy
- Ligue 1: 5th
- Coupe de France: Round of 16
- Top goalscorer: League: Jonathan David (24); All: Jonathan David (26)
Home colours	Away colours	Third colours

The 2022–23 season was the 79th season in the history of Lille OSC and their 23rd consecutive season in the top flight. The club participated in Ligue 1 and the Coupe de France. The season covered the period from 1 July 2022 to 30 June 2023.

== Players ==
=== First-team squad ===
As of 26 January 2023

Note: Flags indicate national team as defined under FIFA eligibility rules; some limited exceptions apply. Players may hold more than one non-FIFA nationality.

No.	Pos.	Nation	Player
3	DF	POR	Tiago Djaló
4	DF	BRA	Alexsandro Ribeiro
5	DF	SWE	Gabriel Gudmundsson
6	DF	POR	José Fonte (captain)
7	FW	CIV	Jonathan Bamba
8	MF	FRA	Jonas Martin
9	FW	CAN	Jonathan David
10	MF	FRA	Rémy Cabella
11	FW	ALG	Adam Ounas
15	DF	FRA	Leny Yoro
16	GK	SVK	Adam Jakubech
18	DF	FRA	Bafodé Diakité

No.	Pos.	Nation	Player
20	MF	ENG	Angel Gomes
21	MF	FRA	Benjamin André (vice-captain)
22	FW	USA	Timothy Weah
23	MF	KOS	Edon Zhegrova
25	GK	FRA	Benoît Costil
26	FW	FRA	Alan Virginius
27	FW	GUI	Mohamed Bayo
28	MF	POR	André Gomes (on loan from Everton)
30	GK	FRA	Lucas Chevalier
31	DF	BRA	Ismaily
35	MF	CMR	Carlos Baleba

=== Out on loan ===
As of 9 December 2022

Note: Flags indicate national team as defined under FIFA eligibility rules; some limited exceptions apply. Players may hold more than one non-FIFA nationality.

No.	Pos.	Nation	Player
—	DF	ALG	Akim Zedadka (оn loan at Auxerre)
—	MF	FRA	Rocco Ascone (оn loan at Nordsjaelland)
—	MF	TUR	Yusuf Yazıcı (оn loan at Trabzonspor)

== Transfers ==
=== In ===
No.	Pos.	Player	Transferred from	Fee	Date	Source
30	GK	(France) Lucas Chevalier	(France) Valenciennes	Loan return	30 June 2022	
11	MF	(Turkey) Yusuf Yazıcı	(Russia) CSKA Moscow	Loan return	30 June 2022	
13	DF	(Algeria) Akim Zedadka	(France) Clermont	Free	30 June 2022	
8	MF	(France) Jonas Martin	(France) Rennes	Free	1 July 2022	
4	DF	(Brazil) Alexsandro Ribeiro	(Portugal) Chaves	€2,000,000 + add-ons and 20% sell-on clause	1 July 2022	
10	MF	(France) Rémy Cabella	(France) Montpellier	Free	10 July 2022	
27	FW	(Guinea) Mohamed Bayo	(France) Clermont	€14,000,000	13 July 2022	
31	DF	(Brazil) Ismaily	(Ukraine) Shakhtar Donetsk	Free	4 August 2022	
18	DF	(France) Bafodé Diakité	(France) Toulouse	€2,500,000 + add-ons	5 August 2022	
26	FW	(France) Alan Virginius	(France) Sochaux	€4,000,000 + 20% sell-on clause	17 August 2022	
11	FW	(Algeria) Adam Ounas	(Italy) Napoli	€2,500,000 + 50% sell-on clause	1 September 2022	
28	MF	(Portugal) André Gomes	(England) Everton	Loan	1 September 2022	
25	GK	(France) Benoît Costil	(France) Auxerre	Free	26 January 2023	

=== Out ===
No.	Pos.	Player	Transferred to	Fee	Date	Source
—	GK	(Greece) Orestis Karnezis	Retirement	Termination by mutual consent	30 May 2022	
1	GK	(Croatia) Ivo Grbić	(Spain) Atlético Madrid	Loan return	1 July 2022	
4	DF	(Netherlands) Sven Botman	(England) Newcastle United	€37,000,000 + add-ons	1 July 2022	
26	DF	(France) Jérémy Pied	Retirement	End of contract	1 July 2022	
8	MF	(Portugal) Xeka	(France) Rennes	Free (Note: On 21 September 2022, Xeka joined Rennes.)	1 July 2022	
11	MF	(France) Hatem Ben Arfa	Retirement	End of contract	1 July 2022	
17	FW	(Turkey) Burak Yılmaz	(Netherlands) Fortuna Sittard	Free	1 July 2022	
2	DF	(Turkey) Zeki Çelik	(Italy) Roma	€7,000,000 + add-ons and 15% sell-on clause	5 July 2022	
29	DF	(Croatia) Domagoj Bradarić	(Italy) Salernitana	€5,000,000 + add-ons and 10% sell-on clause	15 July 2022	
10	MF	(Portugal) Renato Sanches	(France) Paris Saint-Germain	€15,000,000	4 August 2022	
—	DF	(Ivory Coast) Kouadio-Yves Dabila	(France) Paris FC	Sell-on clause	5 August 2022	
24	MF	(Belgium) Amadou Onana	(England) Everton	€36,000,000 + add-ons and 20% sell-on clause	9 August 2022	
11	MF	(Turkey) Yusuf Yazıcı	(Turkey) Trabzonspor	Loan	5 September 2022	
13	DF	(Algeria) Akim Zedadka	(France) Auxerre	Loan	9 December 2022	
1	GK	(Brazil) Léo Jardim	(Brazil) Vasco da Gama	€2,500,000	26 January 2023	
19	FW	(France) Isaac Lihadji	(England) Sunderland	Undisclosed fee and sell-on clause	26 January 2023	

== Pre-season and friendlies ==
Win Draw Loss Fixtures

12 July 2022 Friendly	Lille	5–0	Dunkerque	Camphin-en-Pévèle
11:30 CEST (UTC+2)	David 12', 32'; Burlet 39'; Bamba 57'; Bradarić 61'	Report		Stadium: Domaine de Luchin; Attendance: 0 Referee: Marc Bollengier
Note: Match was played in two 40-minute halves.

18 July 2022 Friendly	Club Brugge	4–3	Lille	Knokke-Heist, Belgium
11:30 CEST (UTC+2)	Okereke 18'; Engels 19'; Audoor 80'; Vermant 90+3'	Report	Zhegrova 22'; David 43'; Ang. Gomes 88'	Stadium: Belfius Basecamp; Attendance: 0

23 July 2022 Friendly	Lille	2–2	Las Palmas	Marbella, Spain
19:00 CEST (UTC+2)	Yazıcı 2'; Bazié (yellow card) 26'; Alexsandro (yellow card) 28'; David 70'	Report	Clemente (yellow card) 43'; Benito 49'; Chevalier 50' (o.g.)	Stadium: Marbella Football Center; Attendance: 0 Referee: Francisco Sáez Vital (Spain)

24 July 2022 Friendly	Espanyol	2–0	Lille	Marbella, Spain
10:30 CEST (UTC+2)	Darder (yellow card) 21'; Joselu 59'; Puado 64'	Report	Fonte (yellow card) 21'; Alexsandro (yellow card) 27'	Stadium: Marbella Football Center; Attendance: 1,000; Referee: Abraham Domínguez Cervantes (Spain)

29 July 2022 Friendly	Cádiz	0–1	Lille	Marbella, Spain
19:00 CEST (UTC+2)	Mbaye (yellow card) 72'; Alarcón (yellow card) 80'	Report	Bayo 20'; André (yellow card) 64'; Fonte (yellow card) 87'	Stadium: Marbella Football Center; Attendance: 1,000; Referee: Mario Melero López (Spain)

2 December 2022 Friendly	Lille	1–0	Club Brugge	Camphin-en-Pévèle
11:30 CET (UTC+1)	Bamba 13'	Report		Stadium: Domaine de Luchin; Attendance: 0 Referee: Ruddy Buquet (France)

7 December 2022 Friendly	Oostende	2–2	Lille	Ostend, Belgium
17:00 CET (UTC+1)	Ambrose 4' (pen.); Berte 83'	Report	Virginius 50', 79'	Stadium: Diaz Arena; Attendance: 0

10 December 2022 Friendly	Valladolid	0–2	Lille	San Pedro del Pinatar, Spain
11:00 CET (UTC+1)		Report	Virginius 26', 58'	Stadium: Pinatar Arena; Attendance: 0 Referee: Lax Franco

16 December 2022 Friendly	Lille	2–0	Cambuur	San Pedro del Pinatar, Spain
11:00 CET (UTC+1)	Virginius 22'; Zhegrova 75'	Report		Stadium: Pinatar Arena; Attendance: 0 Referee: Moreno Munoz

21 December 2022 Friendly	Napoli	1–4	Lille	Naples, Italy
20:00 CET (UTC+1)	Mário Rui (yellow card) 68'; Raspadori (yellow card) 78', (goal) 90+3'	Report	Diakité 17'; David 63'; Ounas 76'; Bamba 82'	Stadium: Stadio Diego Armando Maradona; Attendance: 15,000; Referee: Fabio Maresca (Italy)

== Competitions ==
=== Overall record ===
Competition	First match	Last match	Starting round	Final position	Record							
Competition	First match	Last match	Starting round	Final position	Pld	W	D	L	GF	GA	GD	Win %
Ligue 1	7 August 2022	3 June 2023	Matchday 1	5th	38	19	10	9	65	44	+21	50.00
Coupe de France	8 January 2023	8 February 2023	Round of 64	Round of 16	3	2	1	0	6	2	+4	66.67
Total					41	21	11	9	71	46	+25	51.22

Source: Soccerway

=== Ligue 1 ===
==== League table ====
Pos	Team	Pld	W	D	L	GF	GA	GD	Pts	Qualification or relegation
3	Marseille	38	22	7	9	67	40	+27	73	Qualification for the Champions League third qualifying round
4	Rennes	38	21	5	12	69	39	+30	68	Qualification for the Europa League group stage
5	Lille	38	19	10	9	65	44	+21	67	Qualification for the Europa Conference League play-off round
6	Monaco	38	19	8	11	70	58	+12	65	
7	Lyon	38	18	8	12	65	47	+18	62	

Source: Ligue 1
Rules for classification: 1) Points; 2) Goal difference; 3) Head-to-head points; 4) Head-to-head goal difference; 5) Head-to-head goals scored; 6) Head-to-head away goals scored; 7) Goals scored; 8) Away goals scored; 9) Fair-play points (Note: Head-to-head record is used only after all the matches between the teams in question have been played).

==== Results summary ====
Overall								Home						Away					
Pld	W	D	L	GF	GA	GD	Pts	W	D	L	GF	GA	GD	W	D	L	GF	GA	GD
38	19	10	9	65	44	+21	67	13	4	2	40	25	+15	6	6	7	25	19	+6

Source: Ligue 1

==== Results by round ====
Round	1	2	3	4	5	6	7	8	9	10	11	12	13	14	15	16	17	18	19	20	21	22	23	24	25	26	27	28	29	30	31	32	33	34	35	36	37	38
Ground	H	A	H	A	H	A	A	H	A	H	A	H	A	H	H	A	H	A	H	A	H	A	H	A	H	A	H	A	H	A	H	A	H	A	A	H	H	A
Result	W	D	L	W	L	W	L	W	D	W	W	W	L	D	W	W	D	D	W	L	D	W	W	L	W	D	D	W	W	L	W	D	W	L	D	W	W	D
Position	3	2	12	6	9	6	8	7	9	7	7	6	7	7	7	6	7	7	6	7	6	6	5	6	6	6	6	6	5	5	5	5	5	5	5	5	4	5

Source: Ligue 1
A = Away; H = Home; W = Win; D = Draw; L = Loss

==== Matches ====
The league fixtures were announced on 17 June 2022.

7 August 2022 1	Lille	4–1	Auxerre	Villeneuve-d'Ascq
15:00 CEST (UTC+2)	André 1'; David 3', 39'; Ang. Gomes (yellow card) 58'; Zedadka 64'; Djaló (yellow card) 74'	Report	Jeanvier (yellow card) 44'; Charbonnier 68'	Stadium: Stade Pierre-Mauroy; Attendance: 32,292; Referee: Éric Wattellier

12 August 2022 2	Nantes	1–1	Lille	Nantes
21:00 CEST (UTC+2)	Simon 28'; Girotto (yellow card) 90'	Report	Zedadka (yellow card) 14'; Djaló (yellow card) 18'; Fonte (yellow card) 18'; André (yellow card) 37'; Ismaily 76'	Stadium: Stade de la Beaujoire; Attendance: 30,689; Referee: Bastien Dechepy

21 August 2022 3	Lille	1–7	Paris Saint-Germain	Villeneuve-d'Ascq
20:45 CEST (UTC+2)	André (yellow card) 39'; Bamba 54'; David (yellow card) 83'	Report	Mbappé 1', 66', 87'; Messi 27'; Ramos (yellow card) 34'; Hakimi 39'; Neymar 43', 52'	Stadium: Stade Pierre-Mauroy; Attendance: 47,526; Referee: Clément Turpin

26 August 2022 4	Ajaccio	1–3	Lille	Ajaccio
21:00 CEST (UTC+2)	Magani (yellow card) 71'; Gonzalez (yellow card) 73'; Bayala 84', (yellow card) 86'	Report	Yazıcı 17'; Bamba 43'; Diakité (yellow card) 51'; Zhegrova (yellow card) 57'; Djaló 67'; David (penalty missed) 90'	Stadium: Stade François Coty; Attendance: 9,070; Referee: Thomas Léonard

31 August 2022 5	Lille	1–2	Nice	Villeneuve-d'Ascq
21:00 CEST (UTC+2)	Bamba 20', (yellow card) 85'	Report	Delort 22' (pen.); Rosario (yellow card) 26'; Pépé 29' (pen.); Bard (yellow card) 73'; Atal (yellow card) 81'; Thuram (yellow card) 90+2'	Stadium: Stade Pierre-Mauroy; Attendance: 30,254; Referee: Jérémy Stinat

4 September 2022 6	Montpellier	1–3	Lille	Montpellier
13:00 CEST (UTC+2)	Wahi 20'; Germain (red card) 45+3'	Report	Djaló (yellow card) 16'; David 41', 90+5', (yellow card) 90+4'; Ang. Gomes 57'; Ounas (yellow card) 80'; And. Gomes (yellow card) 86'	Stadium: Stade de la Mosson; Attendance: 12,215; Referee: Jérôme Brisard

10 September 2022 7	Marseille	2–1	Lille	Marseille
21:00 CEST (UTC+2)	Balerdi (yellow card) 14'; Sánchez 26'; Gueye (yellow card) 50'; Gigot (yellow card) 57', (goal) 61'; Touré (yellow card) 68'; Tavares (yellow card) 72'	Report	Ismaily 12'; Djaló (yellow card) 78'	Stadium: Stade Vélodrome; Attendance: 62,985; Referee: Benoît Millot

17 September 2022 8	Lille	2–1	Toulouse	Villeneuve-d'Ascq
21:00 CEST (UTC+2)	David 5'; Fonte (yellow card) 44'; Ounas 53'; Diakité (yellow card) 73'	Report	Chaïbi 48'	Stadium: Stade Pierre-Mauroy; Attendance: 33,635; Referee: Pierre Gaillouste

2 October 2022 9	Lorient	2–1	Lille	Lorient
13:00 CEST (UTC+2)	Diakité 9' (o.g.); Ouattara (yellow card) 33' (yellow-red card) 62'; Abergel (yellow card) 42'; Le Bris 87'	Report	Ang. Gomes (yellow card) 25'; Martin (yellow card) 45'; Diakité (yellow card) 49'; David 78'	Stadium: Stade du Moustoir; Attendance: 14,916; Referee: Hakim Ben El Hadj

9 October 2022 10	Lille	1–0	Lens	Villeneuve-d'Ascq
20:45 CEST (UTC+2)	Fonte (yellow card) 14'; Ang. Gomes (yellow card) 37'; André (yellow card) 38'; David 44' (pen.)	Report	Cabot (yellow card) 4'; Medina (yellow card) 30'; Haïdara (yellow card) 43'; Machado (yellow card) 53'; Frankowski (yellow card) 90+2'	Stadium: Stade Pierre-Mauroy; Attendance: 48,527; Referee: François Letexier

14 October 2022 11	Strasbourg	0–3	Lille	Strasbourg
21:00 CEST (UTC+2)	Le Marchand (yellow card) 19'; Prcić (yellow card) 22'; Nyamsi (yellow card) 81'	Report	André (yellow card) 17'; David 41', 76'; Cabella 80'	Stadium: Stade de la Meinau; Attendance: 25,313; Referee: Jérémie Pignard

23 October 2022 12	Lille	4–3	Monaco	Villeneuve-d'Ascq
20:45 CEST (UTC+2)	Alexsandro 22'; Cabella 39', 62'; Bamba (yellow card) 50', (goal) 71'	Report	Matazo (yellow card) 21'; Henrique 34'; Disasi 44'; Ben Yedder 53'; Badiashile (yellow card) 58'	Stadium: Stade Pierre-Mauroy; Attendance: 35,362; Referee: Willy Delajod

30 October 2022 13	Lyon	1–0	Lille	Décines-Charpieu
20:45 CET (UTC+1)	Da Silva (yellow card) 41'; Lepenant (yellow card) 51'; Lukeba (yellow card) 67'; Lacazette 74'	Report	David (yellow card) 48'	Stadium: Parc Olympique Lyonnais; Attendance: 55,790; Referee: Jérôme Brisard

6 November 2022 14	Lille	1–1	Rennes	Villeneuve-d'Ascq
17:05 CET (UTC+1)	Fonte 16'; Djaló (yellow card) 54'; Bamba (yellow card) 57'; Diakité (yellow card) 74'; Baleba (yellow card) 90+3'	Report	Wooh (yellow card) 36'; Bourigeaud 58' (pen.); Meling (red card) 90'	Stadium: Stade Pierre-Mauroy; Attendance: 35,539; Referee: Johan Hamel

13 November 2022 15	Lille	1–0	Angers	Villeneuve-d'Ascq
15:00 CET (UTC+1)	Djaló 36'; Ang. Gomes (yellow card) 45'; Baleba (red card) 74'; Fonte (yellow card) 65'; Martin (yellow card) 90+4'	Report	Capelle (yellow card) 62'	Stadium: Stade Pierre-Mauroy; Attendance: 36,360; Referee: Miguel Nogueira

28 December 2022 16	Clermont	0–2	Lille	Clermont-Ferrand
19:00 CET (UTC+1)	Gastien (yellow card) 5'; Seidu (yellow card) 33'; Caufriez (yellow card) 45+2' (yellow-red card) 90+1'	Report	André (yellow card) 31'; Ang. Gomes 68' (pen.); Cabella (yellow card) 72'; Bayo 90+3'	Stadium: Stade Gabriel Montpied; Attendance: 13,122; Referee: François Letexier

2 January 2023 17	Lille	1–1	Reims	Villeneuve-d'Ascq
17:00 CET (UTC+1)	David 31'; Alexsandro (yellow card) 84'	Report	Abdelhamid (yellow card) 28'; Cajuste 78'	Stadium: Stade Pierre-Mauroy; Attendance: 31,086; Referee: Eric Wattellier

11 January 2023 18	Brest	0–0	Lille	Brest
19:00 CET (UTC+1)		Report	Cabella (yellow card) 90+5'	Stadium: Stade Francis-Le Blé; Attendance: 11,452; Referee: Mathieu Vernice

15 January 2023 19	Lille	5–1	Troyes	Villeneuve-d'Ascq
13:00 CET (UTC+1)	Bayo 16', 47'; Baleba (yellow card) 23'; David 45+2', 88'; Virginius 75'	Report	M. Baldé 65'	Stadium: Stade Pierre-Mauroy; Attendance: 31,254; Referee: Pierre Gaillouste

29 January 2023 20	Nice	1–0	Lille	Nice
13:00 CET (UTC+1)	Dante (yellow card) 16'; Laborde 34'; Boudaoui (yellow card) 68'; Thuram (yellow card) 72'	Report	Ang. Gomes (yellow card) 85'; Djaló (yellow card) 90+4'	Stadium: Allianz Riviera; Attendance: 22,126; Referee: Eric Wattellier

1 February 2023 21	Lille	0–0	Clermont	Villeneuve-d'Ascq
19:00 CET (UTC+1)		Report	Khaoui (yellow card) 54'	Stadium: Stade Pierre-Mauroy; Attendance: 32,498; Referee: Jérémy Stinat

4 February 2023 22	Rennes	1–3	Lille	Rennes
21:00 CET (UTC+1)	Gouiri 1'; Ugochukwu (yellow card) 64'	Report	Ang. Gomes (yellow card) 20', (goal) 90+3'; Zhegrova 59'; Weah (yellow card) 81'; Cabella 85'	Stadium: Roazhon Park; Attendance: 28,082; Referee: Florent Batta

12 February 2023 23	Lille	2–0	Strasbourg	Villeneuve-d'Ascq
15:00 CET (UTC+1)	David 23' (pen.), 28'; Virginius (yellow card) 80'	Report	Prcić (yellow card) 36'; Dagba (yellow card) 88'	Stadium: Stade Pierre-Mauroy; Attendance: 30,812; Referee: Hakim Ben El Hadj

19 February 2023 24	Paris Saint-Germain	4–3	Lille	Paris
13:00 CET (UTC+1)	Mbappé 11', 87', (yellow card) 77'; Neymar 17'; Verratti (yellow card) 56'; Messi 90+5'	Report	Diakité 24', (yellow card) 45'; David 58' (pen.), (yellow card) 89'; Bamba (yellow card) 63', (goal) 69'; André (yellow card) 90+4'	Stadium: Parc des Princes; Attendance: 46,000; Referee: Willy Delajod

24 February 2023 25	Lille	2–1	Brest	Villeneuve-d'Ascq
21:00 CET (UTC+1)	Diakité 60'; Djaló (yellow card) 61'; Alexsandro 80'; Cabella (yellow card) 90+4'	Report	Djaló 8' (o.g.); Brassier (yellow card) 62'; Camara (red card) 90+6'	Stadium: Stade Pierre-Mauroy; Attendance: 30,257; Referee: Pierre Gaillouste

4 March 2023 26	Lens	1–1	Lille	Lens
17:00 CET (UTC+1)	Fofana (yellow card) 23'; Fonte 41' (o.g.); Gradit (yellow card) 90+1'	Report	And. Gomes (yellow card) 2'; Fonte (yellow card) 27'; André (yellow card) 44'; David 69'; Alexsandro (yellow card) 90+1'	Stadium: Stade Bollaert-Delelis; Attendance: 37,974; Referee: François Letexier

10 March 2023 27	Lille	3–3	Lyon	Villeneuve-d'Ascq
21:00 CET (UTC+1)	Gudmundsson (yellow card) 39'; David 46', 61' (pen.), 79' (pen.); André (yellow card) 72'; Chevalier (yellow card) 75'; Bamba (yellow card) 90+8'; And. Gomes (yellow card) 90+9'	Report	Lepenant (yellow card) 24'; Cherki (yellow card) 60'; Barcola 64'; Lacazette 83', 89'; Kumbedi (yellow card) 85'; Lovren (yellow card) 90+5'	Stadium: Stade Pierre-Mauroy; Attendance: 40,314; Referee: Benoît Bastien

18 March 2023 28	Toulouse	0–2	Lille	Nantes
17:00 CET (UTC+1)	Nicolaisen (yellow card) 85'; Sierro (yellow card) 90+1'	Report	Alexsandro 85'; Bayo 90+11'	Stadium: Stade de la Beaujoire; Attendance: 23,006; Referee: Hakim Ben El Hadj

2 April 2023 29	Lille	3–1	Lorient	Villeneuve-d'Ascq
13:00 CEST (UTC+2)	Cabella 12'; And. Gomes (yellow card) 45'; Weah (yellow card) 50'; André (yellow card) 84'; Zhegrova 88', 90'	Report	Abergel (yellow card) 45'; Meïté (yellow card) 53' (yellow-red card) 78'; Koné 76'	Stadium: Stade Pierre-Mauroy; Attendance: 33,862; Referee: Jérémie Pignard

8 April 2023 30	Angers	1–0	Lille	Angers
17:00 CEST (UTC+2)	Hountondji (yellow card) 30'; Bentaleb (yellow card) 43'; Šabanović 85'	Report	André (yellow card) 22'; And. Gomes (yellow card) 88'; Gudmundsson (yellow card) 90'	Stadium: Stade Raymond Kopa; Attendance: 7,669; Referee: Mathieu Vernice

16 April 2023 31	Lille	2–1	Montpellier	Villeneuve-d'Ascq
13:00 CEST (UTC+2)	Alexsandro (yellow card) 34'; David 70'; Cabella 72'	Report	Sylla 24'; Wahi (yellow card) 43'; Jullien (yellow card) 51'; Kouyaté (yellow card) 90+3'	Stadium: Stade Pierre-Mauroy; Attendance: 34,200; Referee: Jérôme Brisard

22 April 2023 32	Auxerre	1–1	Lille	Auxerre
17:00 CEST (UTC+2)	Niang 62' (pen.)	Report	Fonte (yellow card) 27'; David 36' (pen.)	Stadium: Stade de l'Abbé-Deschamps; Attendance: 16,779; Referee: Stéphanie Frappart

29 April 2023 33	Lille	3–0	Ajaccio	Villeneuve-d'Ascq
17:00 CEST (UTC+2)	And. Gomes 22', 33'; David (yellow card) 29'; Cabella 37'	Report	Soumano (yellow card) 28'; Spadanuda (yellow card) 71'	Stadium: Stade Pierre-Mauroy; Attendance: 35,490; Referee: François Letexier

6 May 2023 34	Reims	1–0	Lille	Reims
19:00 CEST (UTC+2)	Munetsi 21'; Abdelhamid (yellow card) 71'; Alexsandro (yellow card) 83'; Busi (yellow card) 90+4'	Report	Fonte (yellow card) 37'; Ang. Gomes (yellow card) 60'	Stadium: Stade Auguste-Delaune; Attendance: 17,911; Referee: Thomas Léonard

14 May 2023 35	Monaco	0–0	Lille	Monaco
17:05 CEST (UTC+2)		Report	Ang. Gomes (yellow card) 71'; Diakité (yellow card) 90+3'	Stadium: Stade Louis II; Attendance: 6,805; Referee: Benoît Bastien

20 May 2023 36	Lille	2–1	Marseille	Villeneuve-d'Ascq
21:00 CEST (UTC+2)	David 50' (pen.); André (yellow card) 57'; Bamba 72', (yellow card) 73'; Bayo (yellow card) 85'	Report	Clauss 29'; Balerdi (yellow card) 37'; Rongier (yellow card) 55'	Stadium: Stade Pierre-Mauroy; Attendance: 47,399; Referee: Jérôme Brisard

27 May 2023 37	Lille	2–1	Nantes	Villeneuve-d'Ascq
21:00 CEST (UTC+2)	Baleba (yellow card) 43'; David 50' (pen.), 87' (pen.), (yellow card) 88'	Report	Merlin 17'; Castelletto (yellow card) 35'; João Victor (yellow card) 78'; Mohamed (yellow card) 85'; Blas (yellow card) 86'	Stadium: Stade Pierre-Mauroy; Attendance: 41,136; Referee: Éric Wattellier

3 June 2023 38	Troyes	1–1	Lille	Troyes
21:00 CEST (UTC+2)	Lopes 72'	Report	André (yellow card) 15'; Gudmundsson (yellow card) 26'; Ang. Gomes (yellow card) 32'; Diakité 52'; Ounas (yellow card) 55'	Stadium: Stade de l'Aube; Attendance: 11,006; Referee: Jérémy Stinat

=== Coupe de France ===
8 January 2023 Round of 64	Lille	2–0	Troyes	Villeneuve-d'Ascq
20:45 CET (UTC+1)	David 15'; Bayo 68'	Report	Mazou-Sacko (yellow card) 21'; M. Baldé (yellow card) 32'; Dongmo (yellow card) 70'	Stadium: Stade Pierre-Mauroy; Attendance: 13,185; Referee: Jérôme Brisard

22 January 2023 Round of 32	Lille	2–0	Pau	Villeneuve-d'Ascq
18:30 CET (UTC+1)	Kouassi 37' (o.g.); Ang. Gomes 79'	Report		Stadium: Stade Pierre-Mauroy; Attendance: 12,451; Referee: Thomas Léonard

8 February 2023 Round of 16	Lyon	2–2 (4–2 p)	Lille	Décines-Charpieu
18:15 CET (UTC+1)	Cherki 8'; Lacazette 21'; Barcola (yellow card) 26'; Diomandé (yellow card) 84'	Report	David 29' (pen.), (yellow card) 30'; Zhegrova (yellow card) 29', (goal) 64'; André (yellow card) 75'	Stadium: Parc Olympique Lyonnais; Attendance: 24,779; Referee: Benoît Millot
	Penalties
	Tolisso (penalty scored); Dembélé (penalty scored); Caqueret (penalty scored); Lovren (penalty scored)		(penalty scored) Ang. Gomes; (penalty scored) Cabella; (penalty missed) Bayo; (penalty missed) Weah

== Statistics ==
=== Appearances and goals ===
No.	Pos	Nat	Player	Total		Ligue 1		Coupe de France	
No.	Pos	Nat	Player	Apps	Goals	Apps	Goals	Apps	Goals
Goalkeepers
16	GK	(Slovakia) SVK	Adam Jakubech	0	0	0	0	0	0
25	GK	(France) FRA	Benoît Costil	0	0	0	0	0	0
30	GK	(France) FRA	Lucas Chevalier	35	0	32	0	3	0
Defenders
3	DF	(Portugal) POR	Tiago Djaló	26	2	24+1	2	1	0
4	DF	(Brazil) BRA	Alexsandro	23	3	16+5	3	2	0
5	DF	(Sweden) SWE	Gabriel Gudmundsson	18	0	9+9	0	0	0
6	DF	(Portugal) POR	José Fonte	33	1	30+1	1	1+1	0
15	DF	(France) FRA	Leny Yoro	15	0	8+5	0	2	0
18	DF	(France) FRA	Bafodé Diakité	36	3	29+4	3	3	0
31	DF	(Brazil) BRA	Ismaily	25	2	21+2	2	1+1	0
Midfielders
8	MF	(France) FRA	Jonas Martin	13	0	2+10	0	0+1	0
10	MF	(France) FRA	Rémy Cabella	35	7	28+4	7	3	0
19	MF	(France) FRA	Mattéo Makhabe	1	0	0	0	0+1	0
20	MF	(England) ENG	Angel Gomes	39	3	34+2	2	1+2	1
21	MF	(France) FRA	Benjamin André	37	1	33+1	1	3	0
23	MF	(Kosovo) KOS	Edon Zhegrova	25	4	11+11	3	2+1	1
28	MF	(Portugal) POR	André Gomes	27	3	18+8	3	1	0
35	MF	(Cameroon) CMR	Carlos Baleba	21	0	5+14	0	2	0
38	MF	(France) FRA	Simon Ramet	1	0	0+1	0	0	0
Forwards
7	FW	(Ivory Coast) CIV	Jonathan Bamba	35	6	32+2	6	1	0
9	FW	(Canada) CAN	Jonathan David	40	26	36+1	24	3	2
11	FW	(Algeria) ALG	Adam Ounas	22	1	12+9	1	1	0
22	FW	(United States) USA	Timothy Weah	32	0	18+11	0	2+1	0
26	FW	(France) FRA	Alan Virginius	18	1	1+14	1	0+3	0
27	FW	(Guinea) GUI	Mohamed Bayo	30	5	6+21	4	1+2	1
32	FW	(France) FRA	Amine Messoussa	1	0	0+1	0	0	0
Players transferred out during the season
1	GK	(Brazil) BRA	Léo Jardim	6	0	6	0	0	0
11	MF	(Turkey) TUR	Yusuf Yazıcı	4	1	3+1	1	0	0
13	DF	(Algeria) ALG	Akim Zedadka	8	1	4+4	1	0	0

Source: Competitions
