= Leny Yoro =

French footballer (born 2005)

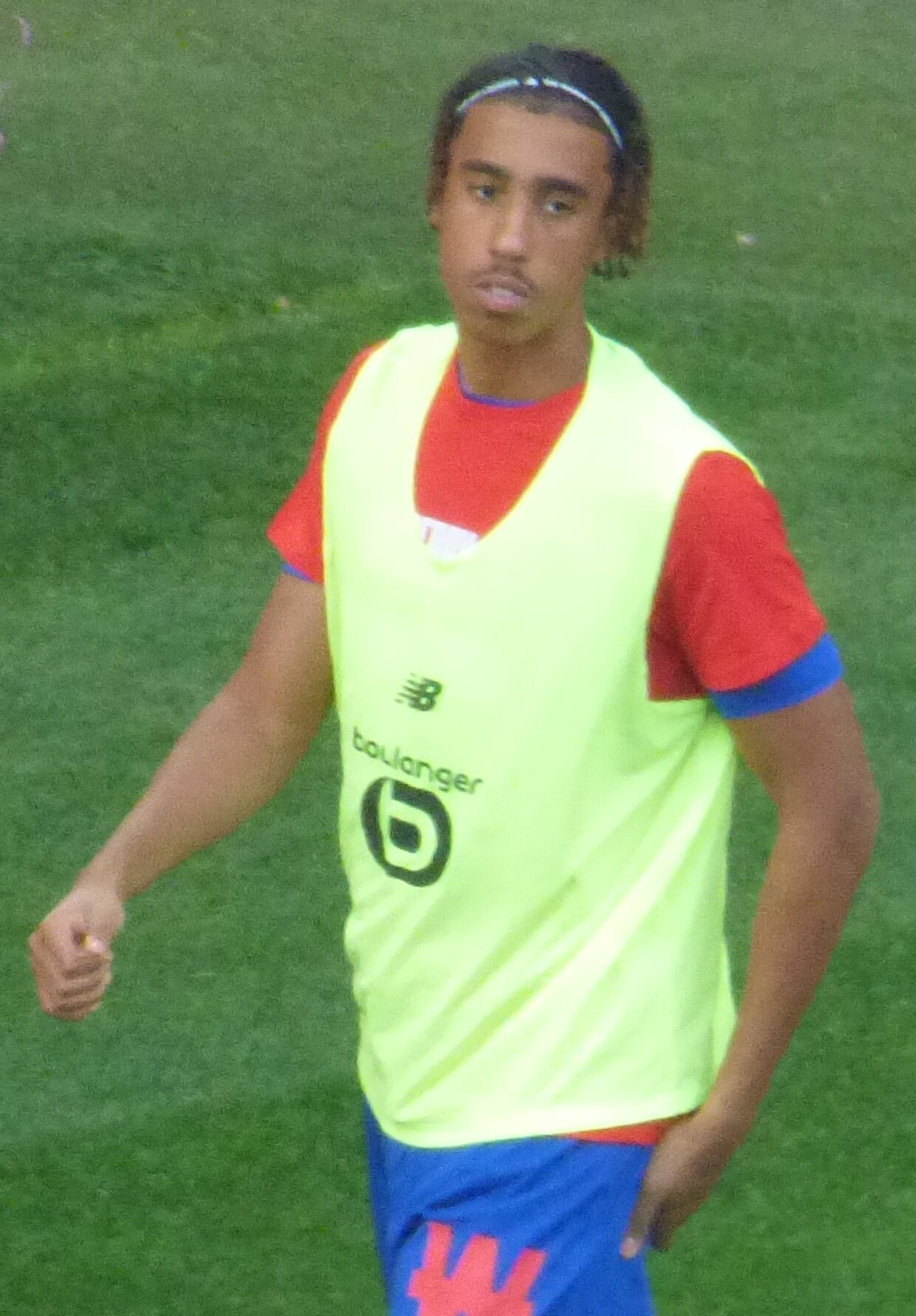
- Yoro warming up for Lille in 2023

Personal information
- Full name: Leny Jean-Luc Yoro
- Date of birth: 13 November 2005 (age 21)
- Place of birth: Saint-Maurice, France
- Height: 1.90 m (6 ft 3 in)
- Position: Centre-back

Team information
- Current team: Manchester United
- Number: 15

Youth career
- 2011–2012: Alfortville
- 2012–2017: Villeneuve-d'Ascq
- 2017–2022: Lille

Senior career*
Years	Team	Apps	(Gls)
2022–2023	Lille B	13	(0)
2022–2024	Lille	46	(2)
2024–	Manchester United	61	(0)

International career^{‡}
2021	France U17	1	(0)
2022–2023	France U18	5	(0)
2023	France U19	2	(0)
2023–	France U21	10	(0)
2024	France Olympic	1	(0)
2026–	France	1	(0)
- * Club domestic league appearances and goals as of 20:20, 22 November 2026 (UTC) ‡ National team caps and goals as of 23:00, 5 October 2026 (UTC)

Leny Jean-Luc Yoro (born 13 November 2005) is a French professional footballer who plays as a centre-back for Premier League club Manchester United and the France national team.

A Lille academy graduate, Yoro joined the club as a child and then became one of their youngest ever first-team players when he made his professional Ligue 1 debut in May 2022, at the age of 16 years, six months and one day. After a first senior season in which he was mainly used as a substitute, he became one of Lille's cornerstones as a teenager in his second full season and made his European debut in August 2023. He was named in the Ligue 1 Team of the Year in the 2023–24 season. In July 2024, he signed for Manchester United for a reported fee of €62 million (£52.2 million), making him the most expensive player aged 18 or younger (Note: Although Kylian Mbappé signed for Paris Saint-Germain in 2017, he initially joined the club on loan before his €180 million transfer was completed the following summer, after he had turned 19 years old.) and one of the most expensive centre-backs in history.

Yoro played youth international football for France at under-17, under-18, under-19, under-21 and under-23 levels. He made his senior international debut in October 2026.

== Early life ==
Leny Jean-Luc Yoro was born on 13 November 2005 in Saint-Maurice, France and spent his first years in the suburbs of Paris. He is the son of Alain Yoro, a former footballer of Ivorian descent who played for Lille reserve team, and Flore Baugnies who is of Northern French ancestry. Yoro is named after Lenny Kravitz, one of his mother's favourite singers. He has three younger brothers: Roméo, Eden and Esteban, of which two play within Lille youth system.

At the age of five, he started playing football at Alfortville where he stayed one season before moving with his family in the Lille area. He then pursued his football learning in Villeneuve-d'Ascq, where he grew up after his parents separated, and finally joined Lille's youth system in 2017. Ten years later, at 15 years old, he got his start in the UEFA Youth League, coming off the bench in the 79th minute against Sevilla on 20 October 2021. He hence chose to wear the number 15 shirt when he then turned professional.

== Club career ==
=== Lille ===
==== 2022–23: Debut as a professional player ====
"Leny at that time was still 16 and the idea then was that it would just be for pre-season. After just two days I said, ‘No, no he will stay with us here’. For me, players don’t have age if they have talent. [...] It was so easy to understand that he would be important to the team. In all my years as a coach, I’ve never seen such a young player with so much maturity. He has so much class, so much elegance. He’s a beautiful player."

— Paulo Fonseca about Yoro's first steps

Yoro debuted with Lille reserve team in 2022, and quickly signed his first professional contract with the club on 10 January 2022. He made his professional debut with Lille in a 3–1 Ligue 1 win over Nice on 14 May 2022 in the penultimate match of the season. At 16 years six months and one day of age, Yoro is the second youngest Lille player, behind Joël Depraeter-Henry and taking the second place from Eden Hazard. In early August, he extended his contract with his club until June 2025.

The following season, he became a permanent member of the professional squad named to play in the 2022–23 Ligue 1. On 17 September, he played his first professional match as a starter in a 2–1 home win against Toulouse. His then-manager Paulo Fonseca stated: "Leny deserved this start, given the way he worked with the team. He deserved to have an opportunity. He had a good match. [...] Being 16 years old, he gave a solid performance, with a lot of character." Fourth centre-back behind veteran and captain José Fonte, Tiago Djaló and Alexsandro, he ended the season with 13 Ligue 1 appearances, including 8 starts, and a total of more than 750 minutes played.

==== 2023–24: Breakthrough and first European matches ====
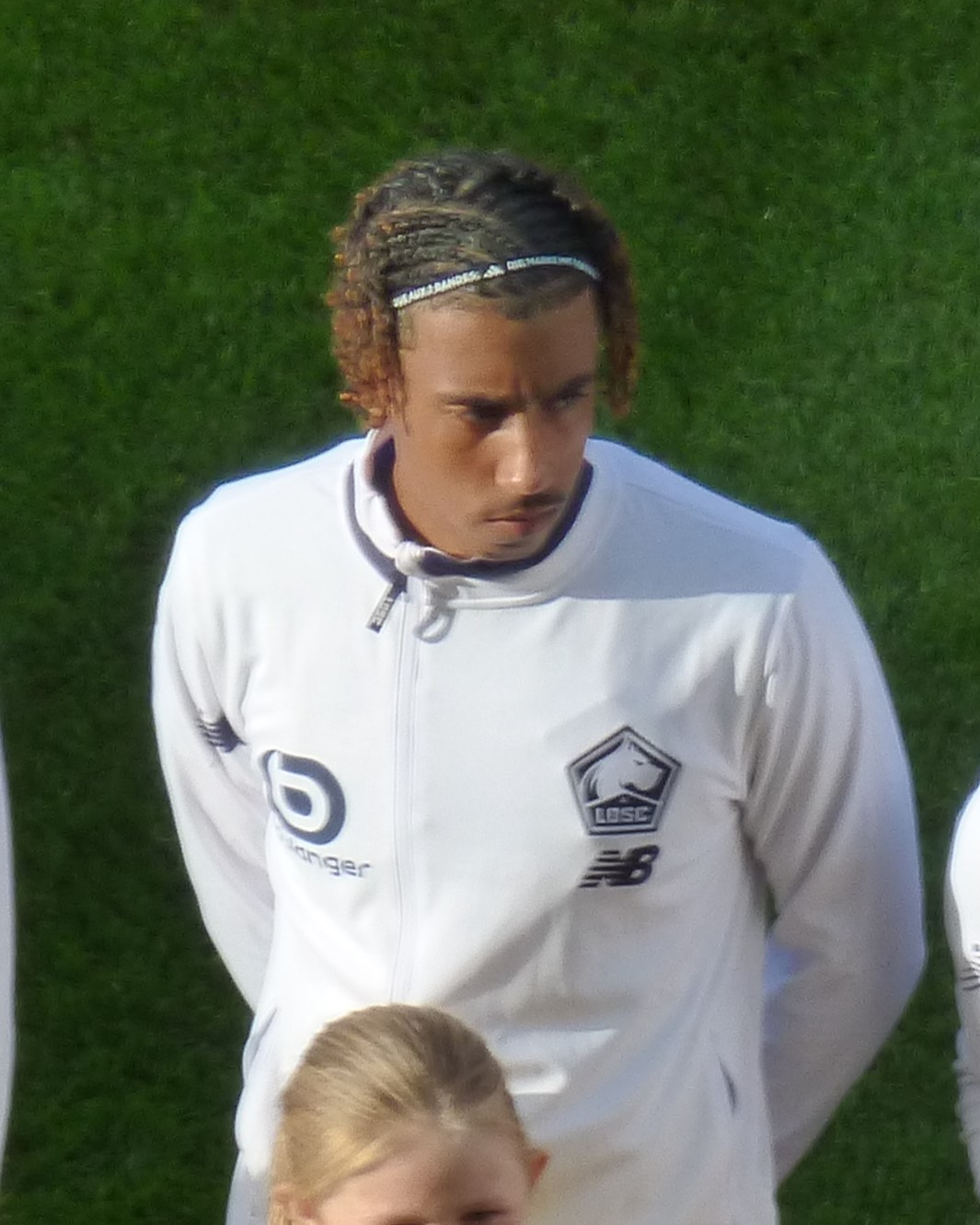
Yoro with Lille in 2023

For his second whole season as professional, Yoro became a full-time starter as a right centre-back and played 32 matches out of 34 Ligue 1 fixtures. He was the second most used French championship player with a total of 3690 minutes in all competitions at only 18 years old. On 24 August 2023, Yoro scored his first goal at the club in a 2–1 victory over Rijeka, in the first leg of the 2023–24 Conference League play-off round. A month later, he scored his first Ligue 1 goal for Lille with a cross-shot volley in a 2–2 away draw against Rennes. He scored his first goal before his supporters at Stade Pierre-Mauroy with a header on 12 November 2023 in a 1–1 draw against Toulouse FC. In April 2024, he started and played every minute in the UEFA Europa Conference League quarter-finals two legs against Aston Villa in which Lille nearly made it to the semi-finals but lost on penalties. Finishing with his team in 4th place, he contributed to the successful domestic season and the new European qualification of the Mastiffs which is led to play the 2024–25 UEFA Champions League qualifying phase and play-off round.

According to studies published in October 2023, Leny Yoro is the second defender to win the most duels among all the players playing in Europe this season, across all age groups with 89% of defensive duels won. Yoro was also the best player under 23 in defensive ground duels won. Alongside Virgil van Dijk, he was the only defender across all European leagues to be both a top 10% player in defensive duel success rate and top 10% in aerial duel success rate. As of March 2024, Yoro was also one of the Ligue 1 best passing players with a total of 1537 passes made – the seventh in the league across all positions – and a completion rate of 92.3%.

At the end of the season, Yoro was nominated for the 2023–24 Ligue 1 Young Player of the Year and named in the Team of the Year. Widely regarded by pundits as one of the best young prospects and a future world class defender, he stated after the UNFP awards ceremony: "It’s a bit of a childhood dream that has come true. It ends a awesome season that we had with the supporters, the staff and the team which has been incredible. [...] It's an honour to have so much attention. When you're a footballer, you have to expect it a little. We know that our performances are examined. Afterwards, I play my football. If there are people watching, it's honestly positive for me and it doesn't impact me on the pitch in any way. I play like I've always played, no matter who is watching me or will watch me."

=== Manchester United ===
==== 2024–25: Going abroad and new chapter in England ====
On 18 July 2024, Yoro officially signed for Premier League club Manchester United on a five-year contract, with the option of an additional year. According to various columnists and reporters, the financial details of the transfer include an initial and base fee of €62m (£52.2m) and a maximum of €8 million (£6.7 million) add-ons depending on sporting conditions. This move made him the most expensive player aged 18 or younger and one of the most expensive centre-backs in history. His contract includes an annual salary around £5.9m gross plus £1.7m in possible bonus payments per season. He was given the squad number 15 – the same one he had in Lille – which was previously worn by club legend Nemanja Vidić. Before eventually choosing to join United, Yoro was also targeted by Real Madrid, Paris Saint-Germain and English rivals Liverpool. Two weeks after his signing, he broke his foot during a pre-season friendly match against Arsenal.

On 4 December, he made his debut in a 2–0 defeat to the same opposition at the Emirates Stadium in the 2024–25 Premier League, coming off the bench in the 59th minute. On 10 April 2025, Yoro scored his first goal for the Red Devils in a 2–2 away draw at Lyon in the 2024–25 UEFA Europa League quarter-final first leg. He equalized the game to 1-1 with a header in the stoppage time of the first half through Manuel Ugarte's assist. Yoro started again in the second leg and garnered praise in a 5–4 win after extra time. The Red Devils eventually lost the final to Tottenham Hotspur, where he became United's second-youngest starter in a European final after Brian Kidd, who played in the 1968 European Cup final. After gradually establishing himself as a starter in Ruben Amorim's defence, he was seen as one of the few bright spots during the club's poor run of form, having played more than 2,000 minutes for his new club and starting twenty-two matches in all competitions after his injury recovery.

== International career ==
=== Youth ===
Yoro is a former youth international, having played for France at under-17, under-18, under-19, under-21 and under-23 levels.

In August 2021, he began his international career when he made an appearance for the France under-17 team, at the age 15 years 9 months and 8 days. The following year, he was called up to the France under-18 team, playing his first match against Estonia on 21 September 2022 and making five appearances in total at this level. Yoro then played at under-19 level when he was called up for UEFA European Championship qualifying competition in 2023. He made his debut against Norway on 25 March. The same year, he quickly took a step up and was called-up to the France under-21 squad by coach Thierry Henry. He earned his first cap on 7 September in a 4–1 home win against Denmark at 17 years 9 months and 25 days old. He then played three games in the 2025 UEFA European Championship qualification.

On 22 March 2024, Yoro made his debut at under-23 level in a friendly match against Ivory Coast in the wake of the 2024 Summer Olympics in France, starting alongside his then-Lille teammates Lucas Chevalier and Bafodé Diakité. Next month, he was called up for the Olympics football tournament in a preliminary list but was eventually retained by Lille due to the 2024–25 UEFA Champions League qualifying phase and play-off round played in August before the start of the Ligue 1 season.

=== Senior ===
On 5 October 2026, Yoro made his debut for the France national team in a 2026–27 UEFA Nations League A game against Belgium.

== Style of play ==
A right-footed 1.90 m (6 ft 3 in) tall defender, Yoro is a slender and agile centre-half who can play in both a four-defender and three-back formation, on both the right and the left of the back-two or three. He has been praised for his ball-playing ability and technical composure, his defensive positioning and playing intelligence. A quick player with long legs, he is able of making chase down tackles, with "a habit of prodding the ball away seemingly from out of nowhere either when an attacker is attempting to shield or looking to run in behind." He often wins defensive duels, having good defence rates and being difficult to dribble. His mindset clearly appears as a key in his precocity. The Athletic emphasised Yoro's "calm and composed performances, which have quickly taken him to the top" during his first professional seasons and his Manchester United debut starts. A man rather quiet and reserved in life, Yoro is seen as a leader on the pitch. For example, he was the captain of his under-13 team. One of his youth coaches remembered: “As soon as he stepped onto the field, he grew in stature. I put him at right-back, up front, in every position, he was immense. On the field, he was a winner, very important for communication and relationships with others.” His coaches often praise his personality, his mature character, and he is frequently compared to Raphaël Varane or Rio Ferdinand.

== Personal life ==
After studying within Lille academy, Yoro graduated from high school in management sciences (STMG). Before joining Manchester United and moving to Northern England, he still lived with his mother and his brothers. He has two dogs, named Kingston and Doogie. Yoro is a devout Christian, sporting multiple tattoos related to his faith and regularly quoting Bible verses on social media. He used to attend an evangelical church when he was living in France and playing for Lille.

== Career statistics ==
As of match played 22 November 2026

Appearances and goals by club, season and competition
Club	Season	League			National cup (Note: Includes Coupe de France, FA Cup)		League cup (Note: Includes EFL Cup)		Europe		Other		Total	
Club	Season	Division	Apps	Goals	Apps	Goals	Apps	Goals	Apps	Goals	Apps	Goals	Apps	Goals
Lille B	2021–22	National 3	9	0	—		—		—		—		9	0
Lille B	2022–23	National 3	4	0	—		—		—		—		4	0
Lille B	Total		13	0	—		—		—		—		13	0
Lille	2021–22	Ligue 1	1	0	0	0	—		0	0	0	0	1	0
Lille	2022–23	Ligue 1	13	0	2	0	—		—		—		15	0
Lille	2023–24	Ligue 1	32	2	3	0	—		9 (Note: Appearances in UEFA Europa Conference League)	1	—		44	3
Lille	Total		46	2	5	0	—		9	1	0	0	60	3
Manchester United	2024–25	Premier League	21	0	3	0	1	0	8 (Note: Appearances in UEFA Europa League)	1	0	0	33	1
Manchester United	2025–26	Premier League	32	0	1	0	0	0	—		—		33	0
Manchester United	2026–27	Premier League	8	0	0	0	1	0	3 (Note: Appearances in UEFA Champions League)	0	—		12	0
Manchester United	Total		61	0	4	0	2	0	11	1	0	0	78	1
Career total			120	2	9	0	2	0	20	2	0	0	151	4

=== International ===
As of match played 5 October 2026

Appearances and goals by national team and year
National team	Year	Apps	Goals
France	2026	1	0
Total		1	0

== Honours ==
Manchester United

- UEFA Europa League runner-up: 2024–25

Individual

- Ligue 1 Team of the Year: 2023–24
