= Bafodé Diakité =

French footballer (born 2001)

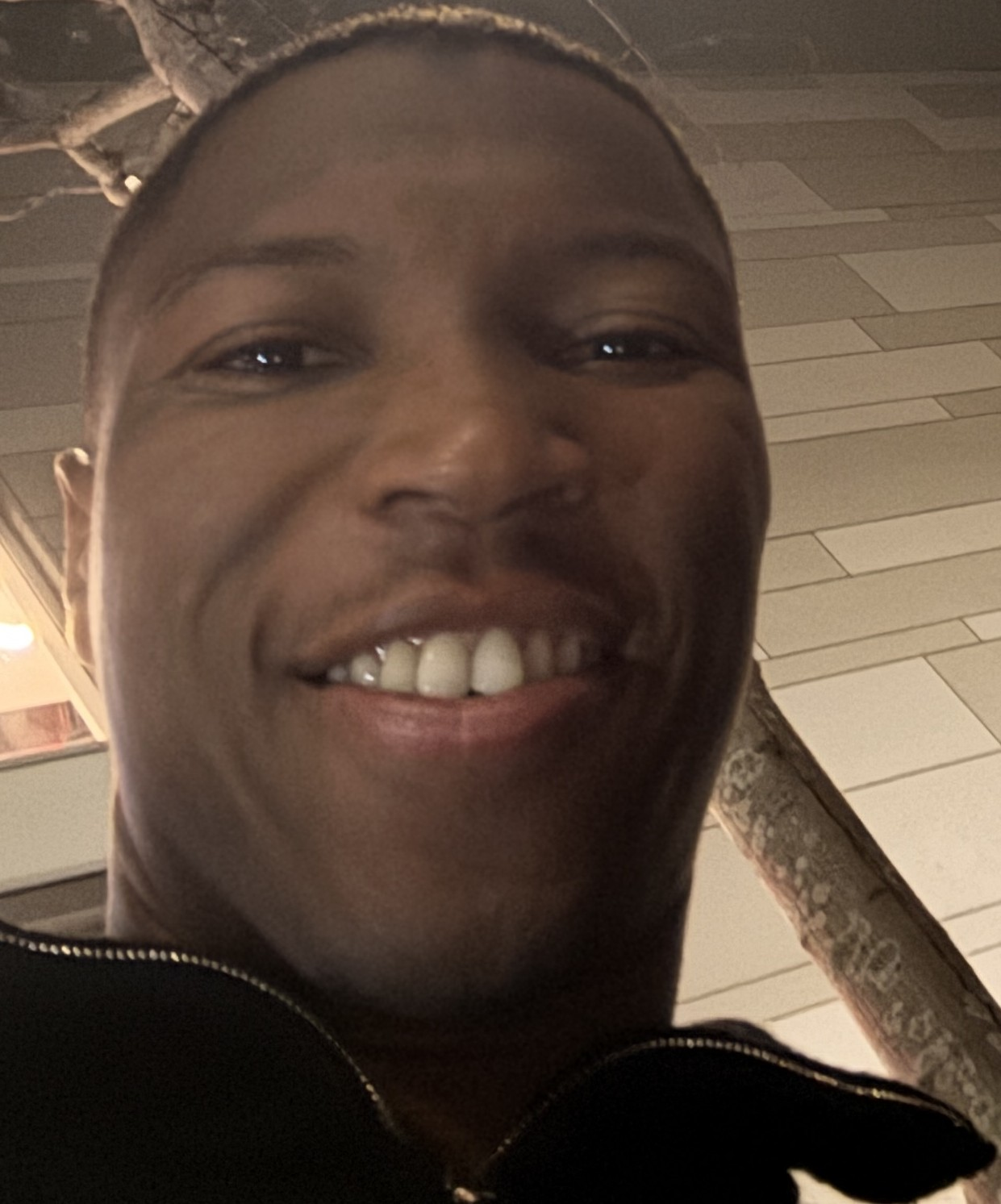
- Diakité in 2025

Personal information
- Date of birth: 6 January 2001 (age 25)
- Place of birth: Toulouse, France
- Height: 1.85 m (6 ft 1 in)
- Position: Centre-back

Team information
- Current team: Bournemouth
- Number: 18

Youth career
- 2008–2013: Toulouse ACF
- 2013–2018: Toulouse

Senior career*
Years	Team	Apps	(Gls)
2018–2021	Toulouse B	10	(3)
2018–2022	Toulouse	72	(7)
2022–2025	Lille	85	(12)
2025–	Bournemouth	19	(0)

International career^{‡}
2016–2017	France U16	8	(0)
2018–2019	France U18	6	(0)
2019	France U19	3	(1)
2022–2023	France U21	4	(0)
2024	France Olympic	2	(0)
- * Club domestic league appearances and goals as of 21:04, 31 October 2026 (UTC) ‡ National team caps and goals as of 23:08, 26 March 2024 (UTC)

Bafodé Diakité (born 6 January 2001) is a French professional footballer who plays as a centre-back for Premier League club Bournemouth.

== Early life ==
Bafodé Diakité was born on 6 January 2001 in Toulouse, France to Guinean parents. He holds French and Guinean nationalities.

== Club career ==
=== Toulouse ===
Diakité made his professional debut for Toulouse in a 1–0 Ligue 1 win over Reims on 5 December 2018, at the age of 17. He scored his first goal for the club on 24 May 2019, in a 2–1 win against Dijon.

=== Lille ===
On 5 August 2022, Lille announced the signing of Diakité on a four-year deal. He made his debut for the club on 7 August 2022, in a 4–1 win against Auxerre. He scored his first goal for the club on 19 February 2023, in a 4–3 defeat to Paris Saint-Germain.

=== Bournemouth ===
On 13 August 2025, Diakité joined Premier League club Bournemouth. He made his debut for the club on 15 August 2025, in a 4–2 defeat to Liverpool.

== International career ==
Diakité is a youth international for France. In 2024, he was called up to the France Olympic football team for the Olympics football tournament in a preliminary list alongside his Lille teammates Lucas Chevalier and Leny Yoro. However, the three players were eventually retained by their club due to the 2024–25 UEFA Champions League qualifying phase and play-off round played in August before the start of the Ligue 1 season.

== Career statistics ==
As of match played 31 October 2026

Appearances and goals by club, season and competition
Club	Season	League			National cup (Note: Includes Coupe de France, FA Cup)		League cup (Note: Includes EFL Cup)		Europe		Other		Total	
Club	Season	Division	Apps	Goals	Apps	Goals	Apps	Goals	Apps	Goals	Apps	Goals	Apps	Goals
Toulouse II	2018–19	CFA 3	9	3	—		—		—		—		9	3
Toulouse II	2021–22	CFA 3	1	0	—		—		—		—		1	0
Toulouse II	Total		10	3	—		—		—		—		10	3
Toulouse	2018–19	Ligue 1	9	1	1	0	0	0	—		—		10	1
Toulouse	2019–20	Ligue 1	16	2	1	0	0	0	—		—		17	2
Toulouse	2020–21	Ligue 2	23	2	3	0	—		—		2 (Note: Appearances in Ligue 2 promotion play-offs)	0	28	2
Toulouse	2021–22	Ligue 2	24	2	3	0	—		—		—		27	2
Toulouse	Total		72	7	8	0	0	0	—		2	0	82	7
Lille	2022–23	Ligue 1	33	3	3	0	—		—		—		36	3
Lille	2023–24	Ligue 1	20	5	0	0	—		7 (Note: Appearances in UEFA Europa Conference League)	1	—		27	6
Lille	2024–25	Ligue 1	32	4	2	0	—		13 (Note: Appearances in UEFA Champions League)	0	—		47	4
Lille	Total		85	12	5	0	—		20	1	—		110	13
AFC Bournemouth	2025–26	Premier League	16	0	1	0	1	0	—		—		18	0
AFC Bournemouth	2026–27	Premier League	3	0	0	0	2	0	3	0	—		8	0
AFC Bournemouth	Total		19	0	1	0	3	0	3	0	—		26	0
Career total			188	22	12	0	3	0	23	1	2	0	228	23

== Honours ==
Toulouse

- Ligue 2: 2021–22
