= Edon Zhegrova =

Footballer (born 1999)

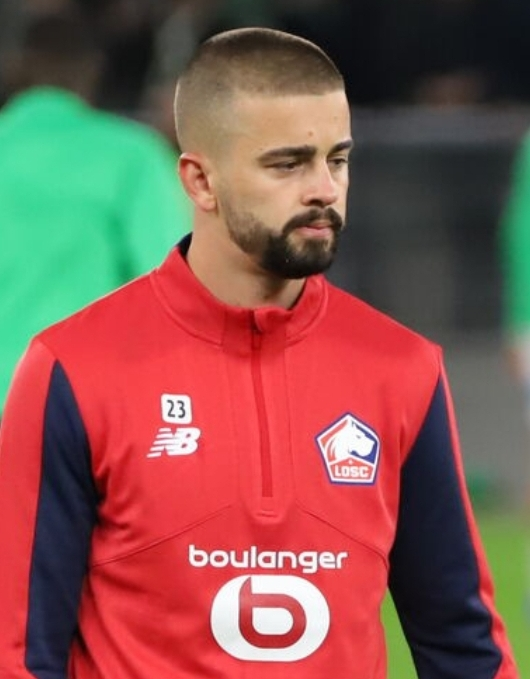
- Zhegrova with Lille in 2024

Personal information
- Full name: Edon Lulzim Zhegrova
- Date of birth: 31 March 1999 (age 27)
- Place of birth: Herford, Germany
- Height: 1.81 m (5 ft 11 in)
- Position: Right winger

Team information
- Current team: Juventus
- Number: 11

Youth career
- 2012: Flamurtari
- 2012–2015: Prishtina
- 2015: Standard Liège
- 2015–2017: Sint-Truiden

Senior career*
Years	Team	Apps	(Gls)
2017–2019	Genk	19	(2)
2019–2022	Basel	60	(9)
2022–2025	Lille	80	(15)
2025–	Juventus	29	(2)

International career^{‡}
2018–	Kosovo	51	(6)
- * Club domestic league appearances and goals as of 23:18, 22 November 2026 (UTC) ‡ National team caps and goals as of 15:40, 14 Novembet 2026 (UTC)

Edon Lulzim Zhegrova (born 31 March 1999) is a Kosovar-Albanian professional footballer who plays as a right winger for Serie A club Juventus. Born in Germany, he plays for the Kosovo national team.

== Club career ==
=== Early career / Genk ===
Zhegrova is a product of youth team systems of the different Kosovan and Belgian sides. In 2012, he was chosen as the best player of the Milan Junior Camp which was held in Kosovo. On 22 March 2017, Zhegrova joined Belgian First Division A side Genk. On 10 September 2017, he made his debut in a 1–1 away draw against Gent after coming on as a substitute in the 80th minute in place of Ruslan Malinovskyi.

=== Basel ===
==== Period on loan ====
On 4 February 2019, Genk announced the loan of Zhegrova to Swiss Super League side Basel. On the same day later, the Swiss club confirmed that he had joined on a one and a half season loan contract and received squad number 30. On 23 February 2019, he made his debut in a 2–0 away win against Neuchâtel Xamax after coming on as a substitute in the 83rd minute in place of Valentin Stocker. He scored his first goal for his new club on 25 September 2019 in the home match in the St. Jakob Stadium against Zürich as Basel won 4–0. It was the third goal of the game.

==== Return as a permanent player ====
On 22 September 2020, Zhegrova signed a three-year contract with Swiss Super League club Basel and received squad number 30. Five days later, he made his debut in a 1–0 away win against Servette after being named in the starting line-up. Seven days after debut, Zhegrova scored his first goal for Basel in his third appearance for the club in a 3–2 home win over Luzern in Swiss Super League.

On 14 January the club announced that Zhegrova had transferred out and signed for French team Lille for undisclosed fee. During his three years with the club from January 2019 to January 2022 Zhegrova played a total of 89 games for Basel scoring a total of 15 goals. 60 of these games were in the Swiss Super League, 3 in the Swiss Cup, 11 in the Europa League and Conference League and 15 were friendly games. He scored 9 goals in the domestic league, 2 in the Conference League and the other 4 were scored during the test games.

=== Lille ===
On 14 January 2022, Zhegrova signed a four-year contract with Ligue 1 club Lille and received squad number 23. Lille reportedly paid a €7 million transfer fee. Eight days later, he was named as a Lille substitute for the first time in a league match against Brest. His debut with Lille came on 6 February in a 1–5 home defeat against Paris Saint-Germain after coming on as a substitute in the 85th minute in place of Jonathan Bamba. One month after debut, Zhegrova scored his first goal for Lille in his fourth appearance for the club in a 4–0 home win over Clermont in Ligue 1.

On 23 October 2024, Zhegrova scored his first UEFA Champions League goal in a 3–1 away win over Atlético Madrid during the 2024–25 season. He missed out on the second half of the season due to a hip adductor injury suffered in a 1–1 league draw to Marseille on 14 December 2024. On 24 August 2025, Zhegrova returned from injury and was named as a substitute for Lille in their second Ligue 1 match against Monaco.

=== Juventus ===
On 1 September 2025, Zhegrova signed a five-year contract with Serie A club Juventus and received squad number 11. Juventus reportedly paid a €15.5 million transfer fee. His debut with Juventus came fifteen days later in the 2025–26 UEFA Champions League league phase against Borussia Dortmund after coming on as a substitute at 86th minute in place of Kenan Yıldız and was involved in the fourth goal as he launched the attack and passed to Dušan Vlahović, who assisted Lloyd Kelly to tie the score at 4–4. On 13 September 2026, Zhegrova scored his first official goals for Juventus, netting a dramatic second-half brace—including an 82nd-minute equalizer and a 91st-minute strike—in a 3–2 away defeat to Sassuolo.

== International career ==
Being an ethnic Kosovo Albanian, Zhegrova had the option to represent both Albania and Kosovo, but decided to represent the latter. In August 2017, he refused a call-up from Kosovo U21 with the pretence that it was important for him to concentrate on playing at the club level for now. On 6 March 2018, Zhegrova finally decided to play for Kosovo. Thirteen days later, he formalizes the decision and accept their call-up for the friendly matches against Madagascar and Burkina Faso. His debut with Kosovo came five days after the call-up in the friendly match against Madagascar after being named in the starting line-up. He scored his side's only goal during a 1–0 home win, thus becoming, at 18 years and 11 months, Kosovo's youngest goalscorer ever, beating the record of Bersant Celina.

== Personal life ==
Zhegrova was born in Herford, Germany to ethnic Albanian parents from the village Dobrajë e Madhe of Lipjan, Kosovo which later would be his temporary residence after his family returned to its capital, Pristina, after the end of Kosovo War. Zhegrova's younger sister, Valza is a former singer.

On 22 August 2025, Zhegrova obtained an Albanian passport, which enabled his transfer to Juventus in Serie A eleven days later as players holding an Albanian passport are considered local within the league.

== Career statistics ==
=== Club ===
As of match played 22 November 2026

Appearances and goals by club, season and competition
Club	Season	League			National cup (Note: Includes Belgian Cup, Swiss Cup, Coupe de France, Coppa Italia)		Europe		Other		Total	
Club	Season	Division	Apps	Goals	Apps	Goals	Apps	Goals	Apps	Goals	Apps	Goals
Genk	2017–18	Belgian Pro League	12	1	2	0	—		1 (Note: Appearance in Belgian Pro League championship play-offs)	0	15	1
Genk	2018–19	Belgian Pro League	7	1	1	1	4 (Note: Appearances in UEFA Europa League)	2	—		12	4
Genk	Total		19	2	3	1	4	2	1	0	27	5
Basel (loan)	2018–19	Swiss Super League	8	0	1	0	—		—		9	0
Basel (loan)	2019–20	Swiss Super League	14	2	1	0	3	0	—		18	2
Basel	2020–21	Swiss Super League	30	5	1	0	1	0	—		32	5
Basel	2021–22	Swiss Super League	8	2	0	0	7 (Note: Appearances in UEFA Europa Conference League)	2	—		15	4
Basel	Total		60	9	3	0	11	2	—		74	11
Lille	2021–22	Ligue 1	13	2	0	0	1 (Note: Appearance(s) in UEFA Champions League)	0	—		14	2
Lille	2022–23	Ligue 1	22	3	3	1	—		—		25	4
Lille	2023–24	Ligue 1	33	6	3	3	11	3	—		47	12
Lille	2024–25	Ligue 1	12	4	0	0	9	4	—		21	8
Lille	Total		80	15	6	4	21	7	—		107	26
Juventus	2025–26	Serie A	19	0	2	0	6	0	—		27	0
Juventus	2026–27	Serie A	10	2	0	0	0	0	—		10	2
Juventus	Total		29	2	2	0	6	0	—		37	2
Career total			189	28	14	5	42	11	1	0	245	44

=== International ===
As of match played 14 November 2026

Appearances and goals by national team and year
National team	Year	Apps	Goals
Kosovo	2018	8	2
Kosovo	2019	9	0
Kosovo	2020	5	0
Kosovo	2021	2	0
Kosovo	2022	4	1
Kosovo	2023	6	1
Kosovo	2024	8	1
Kosovo	2025	3	0
Kosovo	2026	6	1
Total		51	6

Scores and results list Kosovo's goal tally first, score column indicates score after each Zhegrova goal.

List of international goals scored by Edon Zhegrova
No.	Date	Venue	Opponent	Score	Result	Competition	Ref.
1	24 March 2018	Stade Municipal Jean Rolland, Franconville, France	Madagascar	1–0	1–0	Friendly	
2	29 May 2018	Letzigrund, Zürich, Switzerland	Albania	3–0	3–0	Friendly	
3	2 June 2022	AEK Arena – Georgios Karapatakis, Larnaca, Cyprus	Cyprus	2–0	2–0	2022–23 UEFA Nations League C	
4	28 March 2023	Fadil Vokrri Stadium, Pristina, Kosovo	Andorra	1–0	1–1	UEFA Euro 2024 qualifying	
5	12 October 2024	Darius and Girėnas Stadium, Kaunas, Lithuania	Lithuania	1–0	2–1	2024–25 UEFA Nations League C	
6	27 September 2026	Ernst-Happel-Stadion, Vienna, Austria	Austria	1–3	1–3	2026–27 UEFA Nations League B	

== Honours ==
KRC Genk

- Belgian First Division: 2018–19

FC Basel

- Swiss Cup: 2018–19

Individual

- UNFP Ligue 1 Player of the Month: March 2024
