= Jóannes Danielsen =

Faroese footballer (born 1997)

Personal information
- Full name: Jóannes Kalsø Danielsen
- Date of birth: 10 September 1997 (age 29)
- Place of birth: Klaksvík, Faroe Islands
- Position: Right back

Team information
- Current team: KÍ
- Number: 23

Youth career
- –2016: KÍ

Senior career*
Years	Team	Apps	(Gls)
2014–2017	KÍ II	57	(39)
2015–2021	KÍ	133	(10)
2022	Næstved	9	(0)
2022–	KÍ	114	(11)

International career^{‡}
2018	Faroe Islands U21	5	(0)
2019–	Faroe Islands	30	(0)
- * Club domestic league appearances and goals as of 1 November 2026 ‡ National team caps and goals as of 15 November 2026

Jóannes Kalsø Danielsen (born 10 September 1997) is a Faroese footballer who plays as a midfielder for KÍ and the Faroe Islands national team.

== Club career ==
On 28 December 2021, Danielsen signed with Danish 2nd Division leader Næstved Boldklub, after having played for KÍ since 2015. After one season and 9 appearances, Danielsen returned to KI.

== International career ==
Danielsen made his international debut for the Faroe Islands on 15 October 2019 in a UEFA Euro 2020 qualifying home match against Malta.

== Personal life ==
Danielsen works as an electrician while also playing football.

== Career statistics ==
=== International ===
As of match played 13 November 2026

Faroe Islands
Year	Apps	Goals
2019	1	0
2020	6	0
2021	2	0
2022	0	0
2023	4	0
2024	4	0
2025	7	0
2026	6	0
Total	30	0
