= 2026–27 Lille OSC season =

Lille OSC
2026–27 season
- Owner: Merlyn Partners SCSp
- President: Olivier Létang
- Head coach: Davide Ancelotti
- Stadium: Stade Pierre-Mauroy
- Ligue 1: 2nd
- Coupe de France: Round of 64
- UEFA Champions League: League phase
- Top goalscorer: League: Olivier Giroud (3); All: Ayase Ueda; Olivier Giroud (3 each)
Home colours	Away colours

The 2026–27 season is the 83rd season in the history of Lille Olympique Sporting Club, and the club's 27th consecutive season in Ligue 1. In addition to the domestic league, the club is participating in the Coupe de France and the UEFA Champions League.

Davide Ancelotti was confirmed as Lille's new head coach prior to the start of the 2026–27 season.

== Players ==
=== First-team squad ===
As of 6 September 2026

Note: Flags indicate national team as defined under FIFA eligibility rules; some limited exceptions apply. Players may hold more than one non-FIFA nationality.

No.	Pos.	Nation	Player
1	GK	TUR	Berke Özer
2	DF	SUI	Loun Srdanović
3	DF	BEL	Nathan Ngoy
4	DF	BRA	Alexsandro
6	MF	ALG	Nabil Bentaleb
7	FW	FRA	Dilane Bakwa (on loan from Nottingham Forest)
8	FW	FRA	Ethan Mbappé
9	FW	FRA	Olivier Giroud (vice-captain)
10	MF	ISL	Hákon Haraldsson
11	FW	MAR	Osame Sahraoui
12	GK	PAR	Orlando Gill
14	MF	DEN	Maurits Kjærgaard
15	DF	FRA	Romain Perraud

No.	Pos.	Nation	Player
17	MF	COD	Ngal'ayel Mukau
18	FW	JPN	Ayase Ueda
19	FW	TUR	Başar Önal
21	MF	FRA	Benjamin André (captain)
22	DF	POR	Tiago Santos
23	DF	FRA	Tanguy Nianzou
24	DF	IDN	Calvin Verdonk
26	DF	FRA	Isaac Cossier
28	FW	FRA	Gaëtan Perrin
29	FW	MAR	Hamza Igamane
35	FW	FRA	Soriba Diaoune
38	DF	FRA	Maxima Goffi

=== Out on loan ===
Note: Flags indicate national team as defined under FIFA eligibility rules; some limited exceptions apply. Players may hold more than one non-FIFA nationality.

No.	Pos.	Nation	Player
—	GK	BEL	Arnaud Bodart (at Le Havre until 30 June 2027)
—	DF	POR	Rafael Fernandes (at Marítimo until 30 June 2027)
—	DF	CMR	Stéphane Noumbissie (at Sigma Olomouc until 30 June 2027)
—	DF	FRA	Ousmane Touré (at Dunkerque until 30 June 2027)
—	MF	ARG	Ignacio Miramón (at Gimnasia LP until 31 December 2026)

No.	Pos.	Nation	Player
—	FW	NOR	Marius Broholm (at Utrecht until 30 June 2027)
—	FW	POR	Félix Correia (at Sevilla until 30 June 2027)
—	FW	FRA	Noah Edjouma (at Brest until 30 June 2027)
—	FW	FRA	Younes Lachaab (at Sabah until 30 June 2027)

== Transfers ==
=== In ===
Pos.	Player	Transferred from	Fee	Date	Source(s)
FW	(Japan) Ayase Ueda	(Netherlands) Feyenoord	€15,000,000	31 August 2026	

==== Loan returns ====
Pos.	Player	Returned from	Date

=== Out ===
Pos.	Player	Transferred to	Fee	Date	Source
LW/RW	(France) Ichem Ferrah	(Italy) Pisa	Undisclosed	7 August 2026	

== Competitions ==
=== Overall record ===
Competition	First match	Last match	Starting round	Final position	Record							
Competition	First match	Last match	Starting round	Final position	Pld	W	D	L	GF	GA	GD	Win %
Ligue 1	23 August 2026	29 May 2027	Matchday 1	TBD	9	5	3	1	12	6	+6	55.56
Coupe de France	18–21 December 2026	TBD	Round of 64	TBD	0	0	0	0	0	0	+0	—
UEFA Champions League	8 September 2026	TBD	League phase	TBD	4	0	1	3	4	10	−6	0.00
Total					13	5	4	4	16	16	+0	38.46

Last updated: 3 November 2026
Source: Soccerway

=== Ligue 1 ===
==== League table ====
Pos	Team	Pld	W	D	L	GF	GA	GD	Pts	Qualification or relegation
1	Paris Saint-Germain	11	8	2	1	25	12	+13	26	Qualification for the Champions League league phase
2	Lille	11	6	3	2	14	8	+6	21	Qualification for the Champions League league phase
3	Paris FC	10	6	2	2	17	10	+7	20	Qualification for the Champions League league phase
4	Lyon	11	6	2	3	16	9	+7	20	Qualification for the Champions League third qualifying round
5	Marseille	11	6	1	4	23	15	+8	19	Qualification for the Europa League league phase (Note: The 2026–27 Coupe de France winners also qualify for the Europa League league phase (or the sixth-placed team if the Coupe de France winners finish in the top five). If the Coupe de France winners finish in the top six, the Conference League spot will be passed to the seventh-placed team.)

Updated to match(es) played on 21 November 2026. Source: Ligue 1
Rules for classification: 1) Points; 2) Goal difference; 3) Head-to-head points; 4) Head-to-head goal difference; 5) Goals scored; 6) Wins; 7) Away wins; 8) Fair-play points; 9) Drawing of lots.
(Note: Head-to-head record is used only after all the matches between the teams in question have been played).

==== Results summary ====
Overall								Home						Away					
Pld	W	D	L	GF	GA	GD	Pts	W	D	L	GF	GA	GD	W	D	L	GF	GA	GD
11	6	3	2	14	8	+6	21	3	2	1	7	4	+3	3	1	1	7	4	+3

Last updated: 21 November 2026.
Source: Ligue 1

==== Results by round ====
Round	1	2	3	4	5	6	7	8	9	10	11	12	13	14	15	16	17	18	19	20	21	22	23	24	25	26	27	28	29	30	31	32	33	34
Ground	A	H	A	H	A	H	H	A	H	A	H	A	H	A	H	A	H	A	A	H	H	A	H	A	A	H	H	A	H	A	A	H	A	H
Result	W	D	W	W	L	W	D	D	W	W	L																							
Position	3	3	4	1	4	2	4	3	2	2																								
Points	3	4	7	10	10	13	14	15	18	21	21																							

Updated to match(es) played on 21 November 2026. Source: Ligue 1
A = Away; H = Home; W = Win; D = Draw; L = Loss

==== Matches ====
The match schedule was released on 10 June 2026.

23 August 2026 1	Angers	0–2	Lille	Angers
15:00 CEST (UTC+2)	Bermont (yellow card) 22'; Simbakoli (yellow card) 90'	Report	Giroud 11'; Santos 31'; Haraldsson (yellow card) 72'; Perraud (yellow card) 74'	Stadium: Stade Raymond Kopa; Attendance: 12,330; Referee: Jérémy Stinat

28 August 2026 2	Lille	2–2	Paris Saint-Germain	Villeneuve-d'Ascq
20:45 CEST (UTC+2)	Haraldsson 21'; André (yellow card) 52'; Bakwa 84'; Perraud (yellow card) 90+4'	Report	Fabián (yellow card) 39'; Vitinha 90+1'; Marquinhos 90+5'	Stadium: Stade Pierre-Mauroy; Attendance: 47,793; Referee: Éric Wattellier

3 September 2026 3	Toulouse	0–1	Lille	Toulouse
20:45 CEST (UTC+2)	Hidalgo (yellow card) 20'	Report	Ueda 73'	Stadium: Stadium de Toulouse; Attendance: 19,453; Referee: Mathieu Vernice

13 September 2026 4	Lille	2–0	Troyes	Villeneuve-d'Ascq
15:00 CEST (UTC+2)	Santos 18'; Giroud (yellow card) 82'; Mbappé 90+3'	Report		Stadium: Stade Pierre-Mauroy; Attendance: 43,058; Referee: Romain Lissorgue

20 September 2026 5	Nice	2–1	Lille	Nice
17:15 CEST (UTC+2)	Abdelmonem (yellow card) 5'; Ngoy 22' (o.g.); Mandza (yellow card) 45+1'; Amoura (yellow card) 57', (goal) 67'	Report	Ueda 79'; Kjærgaard (yellow card) 90+1'	Stadium: Allianz Riviera; Attendance: 19,405; Referee: Willy Delajod

10 October 2026 6	Lille	1–0	Le Havre	Villeneuve-d'Ascq
17:15 CEST (UTC+2)	Bakwa 5'; Kjærgaard (yellow card) 85'; Goffi (yellow card) 90+2'	Report	Seko (red card) 61'; Ndiaye (yellow card) 63'; Ouziad (yellow card) 76'	Stadium: Stade Pierre-Mauroy; Attendance: 41,268; Referee: Bastien Dechepy

17 October 2026 7	Lille	1–1	Brest	Villeneuve-d'Ascq
20:45 CEST (UTC+2)	Giroud 64' (pen.); Verdonk (yellow card) 89'	Report	Baldé 6'; Doumbia (yellow card) 13'; Locko (yellow card) 58'	Stadium: Stade Pierre-Mauroy; Attendance: 40,779; Referee: Clément Turpin

25 October 2026 8	Monaco	1–1	Lille	Monaco
15:00 CEST (UTC+2)	Coulibaly (yellow card) 32'; Detourbet (yellow card) 56'; Diop 74'; Vanderson (yellow card) 90+1'	Report	Mbappé 24'; Haraldsson (yellow card) 34'; Nianzou (red card) 66'; Perraud (yellow card) 66'; Goffi (yellow card) 90+2'; Özer (yellow card) 90+4'	Stadium: Stade Louis II; Attendance: 11,041; Referee: François Letexier

30 October 2026 9	Lille	1–0	Lens	Villeneuve-d'Ascq
21:05 CET (UTC+1)	Giroud 86'	Report	Abdulhamid (yellow card) 10'	Stadium: Stade Pierre-Mauroy; Attendance: 45,632; Referee: Jérôme Brisard

8 November 2026 10	Rennes	1–2	Lille	Rennes
15:00 CET (UTC+1)	Dia 31'	Report	Diaoune 24'; Verdonk (yellow card) 55'; Ngoy 68', (yellow card) 77'; Kjærgaard (yellow card) 73'	Stadium: Roazhon Park; Referee: Clément Turpin

21 November 2026 11	Lille	0–1	Lyon	Villeneuve-d'Ascq
20:45 CET (UTC+1)		Report	Bidstrup 40'; Tolisso (yellow card) 90+3'	Stadium: Stade Pierre-Mauroy; Referee: François Letexier

28 November 2026 12	Le Mans	v	Lille	Le Mans
20:45 CET (UTC+1)		Report		Stadium: Stade Marie-Marvingt

5 December 2026 13	Lille	v	Auxerre	Villeneuve-d'Ascq
17:15 CET (UTC+1)		Report		Stadium: Stade Pierre-Mauroy

13 December 2026 14	Lorient	v	Lille	Lorient
15:00 CET (UTC+1)		Report		Stadium: Stade du Moustoir

3 January 2027 15	Lille	v	Strasbourg	Villeneuve-d'Ascq
17:15 CET (UTC+1)		Report		Stadium: Stade Pierre-Mauroy

15 January 2027 16	Marseille	v	Lille	Marseille
20:45 CET (UTC+1)		Report		Stadium: Stade Vélodrome

23 January 2027 17	Lille	v	Paris FC	Villeneuve-d'Ascq
17:15 CET (UTC+1)		Report		Stadium: Stade Pierre-Mauroy

31 January 2027 18	Lyon	v	Lille	Décines-Charpieu
20:45 CET (UTC+1)		Report		Stadium: Parc Olympique Lyonnais

6 February 2027 19	Troyes	v	Lille	Troyes
--:-- CET (UTC+1)		Report		Stadium: Stade de l'Aube

13 February 2027 20	Lille	v	Nice	Villeneuve-d'Ascq
--:-- CET (UTC+1)		Report		Stadium: Stade Pierre-Mauroy

20 February 2027 21	Lille	v	Lorient	Villeneuve-d'Ascq
--:-- CET (UTC+1)		Report		Stadium: Stade Pierre-Mauroy

27 February 2027 22	Auxerre	v	Lille	Auxerre
--:-- CET (UTC+1)		Report		Stadium: Stade de l'Abbé-Deschamps

6 March 2027 23	Lille	v	Marseille	Villeneuve-d'Ascq
--:-- CET (UTC+1)		Report		Stadium: Stade Pierre-Mauroy

13 March 2027 24	Brest	v	Lille	Brest
--:-- CET (UTC+1)		Report		Stadium: Stade Francis-Le Blé

20 March 2027 25	Lens	v	Lille	Lens
--:-- CET (UTC+1)		Report		Stadium: Stade Bollaert-Delelis

3 April 2027 26	Lille	v	Rennes	Villeneuve-d'Ascq
--:-- CEST (UTC+2)		Report		Stadium: Stade Pierre-Mauroy

10 April 2027 27	Lille	v	Toulouse	Villeneuve-d'Ascq
--:-- CEST (UTC+2)		Report		Stadium: Stade Pierre-Mauroy

17 April 2027 28	Paris Saint-Germain	v	Lille	Paris
--:-- CEST (UTC+2)		Report		Stadium: Parc des Princes

24 April 2027 29	Lille	v	Monaco	Villeneuve-d'Ascq
--:-- CEST (UTC+2)		Report		Stadium: Stade Pierre-Mauroy

1 May 2027 30	Strasbourg	v	Lille	Strasbourg
--:-- CEST (UTC+2)		Report		Stadium: Stade de la Meinau

8 May 2027 31	Paris FC	v	Lille	Paris
--:-- CEST (UTC+2)		Report		Stadium: Stade Jean-Bouin

16 May 2027 32	Lille	v	Angers	Villeneuve-d'Ascq
--:-- CEST (UTC+2)		Report		Stadium: Stade Pierre-Mauroy

22 May 2027 33	Le Havre	v	Lille	Le Havre
21:00 CEST (UTC+2)		Report		Stadium: Stade Océane

29 May 2027 34	Lille	v	Le Mans	Villeneuve-d'Ascq
--:-- CEST (UTC+2)		Report		Stadium: Stade Pierre-Mauroy

=== UEFA Champions League ===
==== League phase ====
The draw for the league phase was held on 27 August 2026.

Pos	Team	Pld	W	D	L	GF	GA	GD	Pts
32	(Netherlands) Feyenoord	4	1	0	3	4	11	−7	3
33	(France) Lens	4	1	0	3	4	16	−12	3
34	(Czech Republic) Slavia Prague	4	0	1	3	5	9	−4	1
35	(France) Lille	4	0	1	3	4	10	−6	1
36	(Slovakia) Slovan Bratislava	4	0	0	4	1	17	−16	0

Updated to match(es) played on 4 November 2026. Source: UEFA
Rules for classification: League phase tiebreakers

Round	1	2	3	4	5	6	7	8
Ground	H	A	H	A	H	A	H	A
Result	L	L	L	D				
Position	22	34	35	35				
Points	0	0	0	1				

Updated to match(es) played on 3 November 2026. Source: UEFA
A = Away; H = Home; W = Win; D = Draw; L = Loss

8 September 2026 1	Lille (France)	2–3	(Spain) Real Betis	Villeneuve-d'Ascq, France
21:00 CEST (UTC+2)	Ueda 12'; Alexsandro 36'; Mbappé (red card) 56'; Giroud (yellow card) 90+4'	Report	Bartra 33', 49'; Parrott 53'; Natan (yellow card) 56'; Bernal (yellow card) 61'; Roca (yellow card) 71'	Stadium: Stade Pierre-Mauroy; Attendance: 38,587; Referee: Georgi Kabakov (Bulgaria)

13 October 2026 2	Arsenal (England)	3–0	(France) Lille	London, England
20:00 BST (UTC+1)	Merino (yellow card) 29'; Timber 64'; Eze 67'; Saka 71'; Havertz (yellow card) 90+2'	Report	Goffi (yellow card) 81'	Stadium: Emirates Stadium; Attendance: 57,024; Referee: Felix Zwayer (Germany)

21 October 2026 3	Lille (France)	2–4	(Turkey) Galatasaray	Villeneuve-d'Ascq, France
18:45 CEST (UTC+2)	Diaoune 7', 39'; Bentaleb (yellow card) 21'; André (yellow card) 59'; Perrin (yellow card) 89'	Report	Akgün 2'; Batrakov 44'; Bentaleb 52' (o.g.); Osimhen 61'; Jakobs (yellow card) 85'	Stadium: Stade Pierre-Mauroy; Attendance: 44,142; Referee: Rade Obrenovič (Slovenia)

3 November 2026 4	Bodø/Glimt (Norway)	0–0	(France) Lille	Bodø, Norway
21:00 CET (UTC+1)		Report	Ngoy (yellow card) 83'	Stadium: Aspmyra Stadion; Attendance: 7,737; Referee: João Pinheiro (Portugal)

25 November 2026 5	Lille (France)	v	(Germany) Bayern Munich	Villeneuve-d'Ascq, France
21:00 CET (UTC+1)		Report		Stadium: Stade Pierre-Mauroy

9 December 2026 6	VfB Stuttgart (Germany)	v	(France) Lille	Stuttgart, Germany
21:00 CET (UTC+1)		Report		Stadium: MHPArena

19 January 2027 7	Lille (France)	v	(Slovakia) Slovan Bratislava	Villeneuve-d'Ascq, France
21:00 CET (UTC+1)		Report		Stadium: Stade Pierre-Mauroy

27 January 2027 8	Roma (Italy)	v	(France) Lille	Rome, Italy
21:00 CET (UTC+1)		Report		Stadium: Stadio Olimpico

== Statistics ==
=== Appearances and goals ===
No.	Pos	Nat	Player	Total		Ligue 1		Coupe de France		Champions League	
No.	Pos	Nat	Player	Apps	Goals	Apps	Goals	Apps	Goals	Apps	Goals
Goalkeepers
1	GK	(Turkey) TUR	Berke Özer	12	0	8	0	0	0	4	0
12	GK	(Paraguay) PAR	Orlando Gill	1	0	1	0	0	0	0	0
Defenders
2	DF	(Switzerland) SUI	Loun Srdanović	0	0	0	0	0	0	0	0
3	DF	(Belgium) BEL	Nathan Ngoy	12	0	8	0	0	0	4	0
4	DF	(Brazil) BRA	Alexsandro	11	1	8	0	0	0	3	1
15	DF	(France) FRA	Romain Perraud	11	0	8+1	0	0	0	2	0
22	DF	(Portugal) POR	Tiago Santos	7	2	6	2	0	0	1	0
23	DF	(France) FRA	Tanguy Nianzou	5	0	3	0	0	0	1+1	0
24	DF	(Indonesia) IDN	Calvin Verdonk	9	0	1+5	0	0	0	2+1	0
26	DF	(France) FRA	Isaac Cossier	3	0	0+2	0	0	0	1	0
38	DF	(France) FRA	Maxima Goffi	6	0	2+2	0	0	0	2	0
Midfielders
6	MF	(Algeria) ALG	Nabil Bentaleb	12	0	8+1	0	0	0	3	0
10	MF	(Iceland) ISL	Hákon Haraldsson	13	1	8+1	1	0	0	4	0
14	MF	(Denmark) DEN	Maurits Kjærgaard	9	0	1+4	0	0	0	1+3	0
17	MF	(Democratic Republic of the Congo) COD	Ngal'ayel Mukau	13	0	6+3	0	0	0	3+1	0
21	MF	(France) FRA	Benjamin André	11	0	6+1	0	0	0	4	0
28	MF	(France) FRA	Gaëtan Perrin	8	0	1+4	0	0	0	1+2	0
35	MF	(France) FRA	Soriba Diaoune	5	2	2+1	0	0	0	2	2
Forwards
7	FW	(France) FRA	Dilane Bakwa	11	2	3+4	2	0	0	3+1	0
8	FW	(France) FRA	Ethan Mbappé	9	2	7+1	2	0	0	1	0
9	FW	(France) FRA	Olivier Giroud	12	3	5+3	3	0	0	0+4	0
11	FW	(Morocco) MAR	Osame Sahraoui	6	0	1+3	0	0	0	0+2	0
18	FW	(Japan) JPN	Ayase Ueda	6	3	2+2	2	0	0	2	1
19	FW	(Turkey) TUR	Başar Önal	6	0	3+1	0	0	0	0+2	0
29	FW	(Morocco) MAR	Hamza Igamane	0	0	0	0	0	0	0	0
41	FW	(Cameroon) CMR	Angel Yondjo	1	0	0+1	0	0	0	0	0
	FW	(Portugal) POR	Tiago Morais	0	0	0	0	0	0	0	0
Players loaned out during the season
27	FW	(Portugal) POR	Félix Correia	2	0	1+1	0	0	0	0	0

Last updated: 3 November 2026
Source: Competitions
