= 2022–23 Leixões S.C. season =

Leixões S.C.
2022–23 season
- Manager: Vitor Martins
- Stadium: Estádio do Mar
- Liga Portugal 2: 12th
- Taça de Portugal: Fifth round
- Taça da Liga: Group stage
- All statistics correct as of 5 February 2023.

The 2022–23 season is the 116th season in the history of Leixões S.C. and their fifth consecutive season in the second division of Portuguese football. The club are participating in the Liga Portugal 2, the Taça de Portugal, and the Taça da Liga. The season covers the period from 1 July 2022 to 30 June 2023.

== Players ==
As of 15 October 2022

Note: Flags indicate national team as defined under FIFA eligibility rules; some limited exceptions apply. Players may hold more than one non-FIFA nationality.

No.	Pos.	Nation	Player
1	GK	POR	Ricardo Moura
4	DF	SRB	Nemanja Ćalasan
5	DF	BRA	Isaque Gavioli
6	MF	CIV	Evrard Zag
7	MF	POR	Moisés Conceição
9	FW	BRA	Zé Eduardo
10	MF	ANG	Erivaldo
11	MF	POR	Paulinho
13	DF	POR	Pedro Coronas
17	FW	GBS	Agostinho
18	DF	POR	Miguel Silva
19	FW	POR	Rúben Araújo
20	MF	POR	Tomás Couto
21	MF	CIV	Ben Traoré
23	FW	POR	Kiki Silva

No.	Pos.	Nation	Player
24	GK	FRA	Quentin Beunardeau
27	MF	POR	Fabinho
28	MF	POR	Tiago Morais
29	DF	POR	Joel Ferreira
30	FW	BRA	Thalis Henrique
37	FW	SUI	João Oliveira
51	GK	SRB	Igor Stefanović
61	DF	POR	João Amorim
66	DF	POR	João Meira
70	MF	BRA	Rafael Freitas
79	FW	NGR	Arome Idache
91	MF	POR	Ricardo Valente
97	DF	BRA	Brunão
—	DF	CIV	Abdel Diarra
—	FW	CIV	Emmanuel Dasse

=== Out on loan ===
Note: Flags indicate national team as defined under FIFA eligibility rules; some limited exceptions apply. Players may hold more than one non-FIFA nationality.

No.	Pos.	Nation	Player
—	MF	POR	Diogo Leitão (at Vitória de Setúbal until 30 June 2022)

== Pre-season and friendlies ==
Win Draw Loss Fixtures

9 July 2022 Friendly	Trofense (Portugal)	2–0	(Portugal) Leixões	TBD
--:-- WEST (UTC+1)

13 July 2022 Friendly	Oliveirense (Portugal)	1–2	(Portugal) Leixões	TBD
--:-- WEST (UTC+1)

16 July 2022 Friendly	Gil Vicente (Portugal)	3–2	(Portugal) Leixões	TBD
--:-- WEST (UTC+1)

23 July 2022 Friendly	Boavista (Portugal)	0–1	(Portugal) Leixões	Porto
10:30 WEST (UTC+1)			Cannon 47' (o.g.)	Stadium: Estádio do Bessa

26 July 2022 Friendly	Marítimo (Portugal)	2–1	(Portugal) Leixões	TBD
10:00 WEST (UTC+1)	Matheus Costa 65'; Vega 80'		Silva 37'

30 July 2022 Friendly	Fafe (Portugal)	0–2	(Portugal) Leixões	TBD
10:00 WEST (UTC+1)			Zé Eduardo; Thalis

== Competitions ==
=== Overall record ===
Competition	First match	Last match	Starting round	Final position	Record							
Competition	First match	Last match	Starting round	Final position	Pld	W	D	L	GF	GA	GD	Win %
Liga Portugal 2	8 August 2022	May 2023	Matchday 1		19	6	7	6	19	19	+0	31.58
Taça de Portugal	1 October 2022	10 January 2023	Second round	Fifth round	4	3	0	1	13	4	+9	75.00
Taça da Liga	19 November 2022	16 December 2022	Group stage	Group stage	4	2	1	1	6	5	+1	50.00
Total					27	11	8	8	38	28	+10	40.74

Last updated: 5 February 2023
Source: Soccerway

=== Liga Portugal 2 ===
==== League table ====
Pos	Team	Pld	W	D	L	GF	GA	GD	Pts	Promotion or relegation
13	Nacional	34	10	9	15	35	46	−11	39 (Note: Penafiel are ahead of Nacional on head-to-head points: Penafiel 3–0 Nacional, Nacional 1–1 Pennafiel.)	
14	Benfica B (I)	34	10	8	16	52	58	−6	38 (Note: Benfica B are ahead of Leixões on head-to-head points: Benfica B 2–1 Leixões, Leixões 1–1 Benfica B. Leixões were deducted 1 point for financial irregularities.)	
15	Leixões	34	10	9	15	38	49	−11	38	
16	B-SAD (R)	34	9	8	17	41	59	−18	35	Qualification to Relegation play-offs
17	Trofense (R)	34	8	8	18	31	51	−20	32	Relegation to Liga 3

Updated to match(es) played on 28 May 2023. Source: Liga Portugal 2
Rules for classification: 1) Points; 2) Head-to-head points; 3) Head-to-head goal difference; 4) Head-to-head away goals scored; 5) Goal difference; 6) Matches won; 7) Goals scored; 8) Play-off.
(I) Ineligible for promotion; (R) Relegated

==== Results summary ====
Overall								Home						Away					
Pld	W	D	L	GF	GA	GD	Pts	W	D	L	GF	GA	GD	W	D	L	GF	GA	GD
0	0	0	0	0	0	0	0	0	0	0	0	0	0	0	0	0	0	0	0

Last updated: August 2022.
Source: Liga Portugal

==== Results by round ====
Round	1
Ground	
Result	
Position	

Updated to match(es) played on August 2022. Source: Liga Portugal
A = Away; H = Home; W = Win; D = Draw; L = Loss

==== Matches ====
The league fixtures were announced on 5 July 2022.
