= 2022–23 C.S. Marítimo season =

C.S. Marítimo
2022–23 season
- President: Rui Fontes
- Head coach: Vasco Seabra (until 7 September); João Henriques (from 8 September)
- Stadium: Estádio do Marítimo
- Primeira Liga: 16th
- Taça de Portugal: Third round
- Taça da Liga: Group stage
- Top goalscorer: League: Xadas; André Vidigal (2 each); All: Xadas (3)
Home colours	Away colours	Third colours
- All statistics correct as of 1 December 2022.

The 2022–23 season is the 113th season in the history of C.S. Marítimo and their 30th consecutive season in the top flight. The club are participating in the Primeira Liga, the Taça de Portugal, and the Taça da Liga.

== Players ==
As of 31 July 2022

Note: Flags indicate national team as defined under FIFA eligibility rules; some limited exceptions apply. Players may hold more than one non-FIFA nationality.

No.	Pos.	Nation	Player
1	GK	POR	Miguel Silva
2	DF	BRA	Cláudio Winck
3	DF	COL	Moisés Mosquera
4	DF	BRA	Matheus Costa
5	DF	MOZ	Zainadine Júnior
6	MF	POR	Rafael Brito (on loan from Benfica)
7	FW	POR	André Vidigal
10	MF	ITA	Stefano Beltrame
11	FW	VEN	Jesús Ramírez
12	FW	POR	Edgar Costa (captain)
13	MF	POR	Bernardo Gomes
16	MF	POR	Diogo Mendes
17	MF	POR	Xadas
20	MF	POR	Miguel Sousa
21	MF	BRA	João Afonso

No.	Pos.	Nation	Player
22	FW	POR	Francisco Gomes
24	FW	MOZ	Clésio
34	MF	ARG	Lucho Vega
39	FW	NGR	Stanley Kanu
44	MF	POR	André Teles
45	DF	POR	Fábio China
59	GK	CZE	Matouš Trmal (on loan from Vitória de Guimarães)
60	MF	POR	Pedro Pelágio
66	DF	BRA	Léo Andrade
85	DF	GBS	Nito Gomes
94	DF	BRA	Vítor Costa
95	FW	CMR	Joel Tagueu
96	GK	POR	Pedro Teixeira
—	FW	ESP	Pablo Moreno

=== Other players under contract ===
Note: Flags indicate national team as defined under FIFA eligibility rules; some limited exceptions apply. Players may hold more than one non-FIFA nationality.

No.	Pos.	Nation	Player
18	DF	BRA	Facundo Costantini
20	FW	BRA	Kibe Jefferson
78	MF	POR	Francisco França

=== Out on loan ===
Note: Flags indicate national team as defined under FIFA eligibility rules; some limited exceptions apply. Players may hold more than one non-FIFA nationality.

No.	Pos.	Nation	Player
6	MF	POR	Filipe Cardoso (at Académico de Viseu until 31 July 2022)
—	DF	POR	Marcos Silva (at Leiria until 31 July 2022)

== Pre-season and friendlies ==
Win Draw Loss Fixtures

2 July 2022 Friendly	Marítimo (Portugal)	2–2	(Portugal) Marítimo U23	TBD
--:-- WEST (UTC+1)

9 July 2022 Friendly	Marítimo (Portugal)	1–0	(Portugal) Marítimo B	TBD
--:-- WEST (UTC+1)

16 July 2022 Friendly	Nacional (Portugal)	0–1	(Portugal) Marítimo	TBD
--:-- WEST (UTC+1)

20 July 2022 Friendly	Penafiel (Portugal)	1–1	(Portugal) Marítimo	TBD
--:-- WEST (UTC+1)

23 July 2022 Friendly	Casa Pia (Portugal)	0–0	(Portugal) Marítimo	Lousada
10:00 WEST (UTC+1)				Stadium: Complexo Desportivo de Lousada

26 July 2022 Friendly	Marítimo (Portugal)	2–1	(Portugal) Leixões	TBD
10:00 WEST (UTC+1)	Matheus Costa 65'; Vega 80'		Silva 37'

26 July 2022 Friendly	Boavista (Portugal)	1–1	(Portugal) Marítimo	TBD
15:30 WEST (UTC+1)	Gorré		Beltrame

29 July 2022 Friendly	Marítimo (Portugal)	1–0	(Portugal) Santa Clara	Funchal
20:30 WEST (UTC+1)	Matheus Costa 43'			Stadium: Estádio do Marítimo

24 September 2022 Friendly	Marítimo (Portugal)	3–1	(Portugal) Marítimo U23	Ribeira Brava
--:-- WEST (UTC+1)		Report		Stadium: Estádio Municipal da Ribeira Brava

== Competitions ==
=== Overall record ===
Competition	First match	Last match	Starting round	Final position	Record							
Competition	First match	Last match	Starting round	Final position	Pld	W	D	L	GF	GA	GD	Win %
Primeira Liga	2 October 2022	May 2023	Matchday 1		13	1	3	9	8	27	−19	7.69
Taça de Portugal	15 October 2022		Third round	Third round	1	0	0	1	2	4	−2	0.00
Taça da Liga	1 December 2022		Group stage		1	0	0	1	0	1	−1	0.00
Total					15	1	3	11	10	32	−22	6.67

Last updated: 1 December 2022
Source: Soccerway

=== Primeira Liga ===
==== League table ====
Pos	Team	Pld	W	D	L	GF	GA	GD	Pts	Qualification or relegation
14	Estoril	34	10	5	19	33	49	−16	35	
15	Portimonense	34	10	4	20	25	48	−23	34	
16	Marítimo (R)	34	7	5	22	32	63	−31	26	Qualification for the relegation play-offs
17	Paços de Ferreira (R)	34	6	5	23	26	62	−36	23	Relegation to Liga Portugal 2
18	Santa Clara (R)	34	5	7	22	26	58	−32	22	Relegation to Liga Portugal 2

Source: Liga Portugal
Rules for classification: 1) Points; 2) Head-to-head points; 3) Head-to-head goal difference; 4) Goal difference; 5) Matches won; 6) Goals scored; 7) Play-off.
(R) Relegated

==== Results summary ====
Overall								Home						Away					
Pld	W	D	L	GF	GA	GD	Pts	W	D	L	GF	GA	GD	W	D	L	GF	GA	GD
34	7	5	22	32	63	−31	26	6	3	8	21	23	−2	1	2	14	11	40	−29

Last updated: 27 May 2023.
Source: Liga Portugal

==== Results by round ====
Round	1	2	3	4	5	6	7	8	9	10	11	12	13	14	15	16	17	18	19	20	21	22	23	24	25	26	27	28	29	30	31	32	33	34
Ground	A	H	A	H	A	H	A	H	A	H	A	H	A	A	H	A	H	H	A	H	A	H	A	H	A	H	A	H	A	H	H	A	H	A
Result	L	L	L	L	L	L	L	L	D	D	W	D	L	D	W	L	W	L	L	L	L	W	L	L	L	W	L	W	L	L	D	L	W	L
Position	17	17	18	18	17	18	18	18	18	18	17	17	17	17	17	17	17	17	17	17	17	16	16	16	16	16	16	16	16	16	16	16	16	16

Updated to match(es) played on 27 May 2023. Source: Liga Portugal
A = Away; H = Home; W = Win; D = Draw; L = Loss

==== Matches ====
The league fixtures were announced on 5 July 2022.

6 August 2022 1	Porto	v	Marítimo	Porto
20:30 WEST (UTC+1)				Stadium: Estádio do Dragão
