= 2024–25 Lille OSC season =

Lille OSC
2024–25 season
- Owner: Merlyn Partners SCSp
- President: Olivier Létang
- Head coach: Bruno Génésio
- Stadium: Stade Pierre-Mauroy
- Ligue 1: 5th
- Coupe de France: Round of 16
- UEFA Champions League: Round of 16
- Top goalscorer: League: Jonathan David (16); All: Jonathan David (25)
- Average home league attendance: 42,382
Home colours	Away colours	Third colours

The 2024–25 season was the 81st season in the history of Lille Olympique Sporting Club, and the club's 25th consecutive season in Ligue 1. In addition to the domestic league, the club participated in the Coupe de France and the UEFA Champions League.

== Players ==
=== First-team squad ===
As of 8 January 2025

Note: Flags indicate national team as defined under FIFA eligibility rules; some limited exceptions apply. Players may hold more than one non-FIFA nationality.

No.	Pos.	Nation	Player
1	GK	ITA	Vito Mannone
2	DF	ALG	Aïssa Mandi
4	DF	BRA	Alexsandro
5	DF	SWE	Gabriel Gudmundsson
6	MF	ALG	Nabil Bentaleb
7	MF	ISL	Hákon Arnar Haraldsson
8	MF	ENG	Angel Gomes
9	FW	CAN	Jonathan David (vice-captain)
10	MF	FRA	Rémy Cabella
11	FW	MAR	Osame Sahraoui
12	DF	BEL	Thomas Meunier
14	DF	FRA	Samuel Umtiti
16	GK	FRA	Marc-Aurèle Caillard

No.	Pos.	Nation	Player
17	MF	COD	Ngal'ayel Mukau
18	DF	FRA	Bafodé Diakité (3rd captain)
19	FW	ESP	Matias Fernandez-Pardo
20	DF	NED	Mitchel Bakker (on loan from Atalanta)
21	MF	FRA	Benjamin André (captain)
22	DF	POR	Tiago Santos
23	MF	KOS	Edon Zhegrova
24	FW	ENG	Chuba Akpom (on loan from Ajax)
26	MF	POR	André Gomes
29	FW	FRA	Ethan Mbappé
30	GK	FRA	Lucas Chevalier
31	DF	BRA	Ismaily
32	MF	FRA	Ayyoub Bouaddi

==== Out on loan ====
Note: Flags indicate national team as defined under FIFA eligibility rules; some limited exceptions apply. Players may hold more than one non-FIFA nationality.

No.	Pos.	Nation	Player
—	DF	POR	Rafael Fernandes (at Rangers until 30 June 2025)
—	DF	FRA	Ousmane Touré (at Valenciennes until 30 June 2025)
—	MF	ARG	Ignacio Miramón (at Boca Juniors until 31 December 2025)
—	FW	GUI	Mohamed Bayo (at Antwerp until 30 June 2025)

No.	Pos.	Nation	Player
—	FW	SRB	Andrej Ilić (at Union Berlin until 30 June 2025)
—	FW	POR	Tiago Morais (at Rio Ave until 30 June 2025)
—	FW	FRA	Alan Virginius (at Young Boys until 30 June 2025)

== Transfers ==
=== In ===
No.	Pos.	Player	Transferred from	Fee	Date	Source
29	FW	(France) Ethan Mbappé	Unattached	Free	4 July 2024	
17	MF	(Democratic Republic of the Congo) Ngal'ayel Mukau	(Belgium) Mechelen	€5,000,000	11 July 2024	
12	DF	(Belgium) Thomas Meunier	(Turkey) Trabzonspor	Free	19 July 2024	
2	DF	(Algeria) Aïssa Mandi	(Spain) Villarreal	Free	1 August 2024	
11	FW	(Morocco) Osame Sahraoui	(Netherlands) Heerenveen	€8,000,000	1 August 2024	
16	GK	(France) Marc-Aurèle Caillard	Unattached	Free	30 August 2024	
20	DF	(Netherlands) Mitchel Bakker	(Italy) Atalanta	Loan	30 August 2024	
19	FW	(Belgium) Matias Fernandez-Pardo	(Belgium) Gent	€12,000,000 (Note: Bonuses included)	30 August 2024	
26	MF	(Portugal) André Gomes	Unattached	Free	6 September 2024	
24	FW	(England) Chuba Akpom	(Netherlands) Ajax	Loan	2 February 2025	

=== Out ===
Pos.	Player	Transferred to	Fee	Date	Source
FW	(Portugal) Ivan Cavaleiro	Released	Free	1 July 2024	
GK	(Slovakia) Adam Jakubech	Released	Free	1 July 2024	
MF	(Algeria) Adam Ounas	Released	Free	1 July 2024	
MF	(Turkey) Yusuf Yazıcı	Released	Free	1 July 2024	
DF	(France) Leny Yoro	(England) Manchester United	€62,000,000	18 July 2024	
FW	(Portugal) Tiago Morais	(Portugal) Rio Ave	Loan	27 July 2024	
FW	(France) Alan Virginius	(Switzerland) Young Boys	Loan (Note: Includes an option to sign permanently for €4,500,000)	3 August 2024	
MF	(Argentina) Ignacio Miramón	(Argentina) Boca Juniors	Loan (Note: Includes an option to sign permanently for €3,000,000)	14 August 2024	
FW	(France) Trévis Dago	(France) Annecy	Loan	20 August 2024	
MF	(France) Ichem Ferrah	(France) Rouen	Loan	26 August 2024	
MF	(France) Ugo Raghouber	(France) Dunkerque	Loan	29 August 2024	
FW	(Serbia) Andrej Ilić	(Germany) Union Berlin	Loan (Note: Includes an option to sign permanently)	30 August 2024	
DF	(Belgium) Vincent Burlet	(France) Le Mans	Loan	31 August 2024	
DF	(France) Ousmane Touré	(France) Valenciennes	Loan	6 January 2025	
DF	(Algeria) Akim Zedadka	(Poland) Piast Gliwice	Free	8 January 2025	
FW	(Guinea) Mohamed Bayo	(Belgium) Antwerp	Loan	3 February 2025	

== Pre-season and friendlies ==
Win Draw Loss

9 July 2024 Friendly	Lille	3–1	Deinze	Camphin-en-Pévèle, France
17:00 CEST (UTC+2)	Alexsandro 7'; Santos 22'; André 81'	Report	Dierckx 69'	Stadium: Domaine de Luchin; Attendance: 0

13 July 2024 Friendly	Lille	1–1	Mechelen	Camphin-en-Pévèle, France
17:00 CEST (UTC+2)	Cabella 27'	Report	Mrabti 71'	Stadium: Domaine de Luchin; Attendance: 0

17 July 2024 Friendly	Gent	0–1	Lille	Ghent, Belgium
19:30 CEST (UTC+2)		Report	Cabella 7'	Stadium: Planet Group Arena

20 July 2024 Friendly	Genk	2–2	Lille	Genk, Belgium
18:30 CEST (UTC+2)	Arokodare 38'; Bangoura (yellow card) 18', (goal) 39'	Report	Bayo 7'; André (yellow card) 21'; Cabella 75'; Ismaily 84'	Stadium: Cegeka Arena

24 July 2024 Friendly	VfL Wolfsburg	1–0	Lille	Rheda-Wiedenbrück, Germany
16:30 CEST (UTC+2)	Behrens 54' (pen.)	Report	Diakité (yellow card) 22'; André (yellow card) 25'; Virginius (yellow card) 80'; Malouda (yellow card) 88'	Stadium: Jahnstadion; Attendance: 350; Referee: Yannick Rupert (Germany)

24 July 2024 Friendly	Lille	3–1	Celta Vigo	Valenciennes, France
19:00 CEST (UTC+2)	Haraldsson 21'; Gudmundsson 23'; Bayo 34'	Report	Douvikas 38'	Stadium: Stade du Hainaut

== Competitions ==
=== Overall record ===
Competition	First match	Last match	Starting round	Final position	Record							
Competition	First match	Last match	Starting round	Final position	Pld	W	D	L	GF	GA	GD	Win %
Ligue 1	17 August 2024	17 May 2025	Matchday 1	5th	34	17	9	8	52	36	+16	50.00
Coupe de France	20 December 2024	4 February 2025	Round of 64	Round of 16	3	1	2	0	3	2	+1	33.33
UEFA Champions League	6 August 2024	12 March 2025	Third qualifying round	Round of 16	14	7	3	4	25	17	+8	50.00
Total					51	25	14	12	80	55	+25	49.02

Source: Soccerway

=== Ligue 1 ===
==== League table ====
Pos	Team	Pld	W	D	L	GF	GA	GD	Pts	Qualification or relegation
3	Monaco	34	18	7	9	63	41	+22	61	Qualification for the Champions League league phase
4	Nice	34	17	9	8	66	41	+25	60	Qualification for the Champions League third qualifying round
5	Lille	34	17	9	8	52	36	+16	60	Qualification for the Europa League league phase (Note: Since the 2024–25 Coupe de France winners, Paris Saint-Germain, qualified for the Champions League via league position, the Europa League berth awarded to the cup winners was passed to the sixth-placed team and the Conference League berth was passed to the seventh-placed team.)
6	Lyon	34	17	6	11	65	46	+19	57	Qualification for the Europa League league phase
7	Strasbourg	34	16	9	9	56	44	+12	57	Qualification for the Conference League play-off round

Source: Ligue 1
Rules for classification: 1) Points; 2) Goal difference; 3) Head-to-head points; 4) Head-to-head goal difference; 5) Head-to-head goals scored; 6) Head-to-head away goals scored; 7) Goals scored; 8) Away goals scored; 9) Fair-play points (Note: Head-to-head record is used only after all the matches between the teams in question have been played).

==== Results summary ====
Overall								Home						Away					
Pld	W	D	L	GF	GA	GD	Pts	W	D	L	GF	GA	GD	W	D	L	GF	GA	GD
34	17	9	8	52	36	+16	60	11	4	2	31	18	+13	6	5	6	21	18	+3

Source: Ligue 1

==== Results by round ====
Round	1	2	3	4	5	6	7	8	9	10	11	12	13	14	15	16	17	18	19	20	21	22	23	24	25	26	27	28	29	30	31	32	33	34
Ground	A	H	H	A	H	A	H	A	A	H	A	H	A	H	A	H	A	H	A	H	H	A	H	A	H	A	H	A	A	H	A	H	A	H
Result	W	W	L	L	D	W	W	D	W	D	D	W	D	W	D	D	D	W	L	W	L	W	W	L	W	L	W	L	W	W	W	D	L	W
Position	4	2	6	8	9	5	5	4	4	4	4	4	4	4	4	4	5	3	5	4	5	5	4	5	5	6	5	7	5	4	3	5	5	5
Points	3	6	6	6	7	10	13	14	17	18	19	22	23	26	27	28	29	32	32	35	35	38	41	41	44	44	47	47	50	53	56	57	57	60

Source: Ligue 1
A = Away; H = Home; W = Win; D = Draw; L = Loss

==== Matches ====
The match schedule was released on 21 June 2024.

17 August 2024 1	Reims	0–2	Lille	Reims
19:00 CEST (UTC+2)	Koné (red card) 16'; Atangana (yellow card) 47'; Fofana (yellow card) 90+2'	Report	Diakité 45+30'; Ismaily (yellow card) 68'; Mukau (yellow card) 72'; David 90+3'	Stadium: Stade Auguste-Delaune; Attendance: 14,755; Referee: Eric Wattellier

24 August 2024 2	Lille	2–0	Angers	Villeneuve-d'Ascq
19:00 CEST (UTC+2)	Meunier 34'; Mbappé (yellow card) 45+1'; Bayo 90+5'	Report	Ould Khaled (yellow card) 43'; El Melali (yellow card) 63'	Stadium: Stade Pierre-Mauroy; Attendance: 36,906; Referee: Abdelatif Kherradji

1 September 2024 3	Lille	1–3	Paris Saint-Germain	Villeneuve-d'Ascq
20:45 CEST (UTC+2)	Alexsandro (yellow card) 31'; Mukau (yellow card) 47'; Zhegrova 78'; Diakité (yellow card) 90+1'	Report	Beraldo (yellow card) 24'; Vitinha 33' (pen.); Barcola 36'; Donnarumma (yellow card) 84'; Kolo Muani 90+2'	Stadium: Stade Pierre-Mauroy; Attendance: 45,434; Referee: Benoît Bastien

13 September 2024 4	Saint-Étienne	1–0	Lille	Saint-Étienne
20:45 CEST (UTC+2)	Cafaro 6'; Cornud (yellow card) 61'	Report	André (yellow card) 54'	Stadium: Stade Geoffroy-Guichard; Attendance: 22,144; Referee: François Letexier

21 September 2024 5	Lille	3–3	Strasbourg	Villeneuve-d'Ascq
17:00 CEST (UTC+2)	Zhegrova 15', 27'; André (yellow card) 64'; Diakité (yellow card) 70'; David 84' (pen.)	Report	Sow (yellow card) 7'; Andrey Santos 30'; Emegha 42'; Nanasi 66'; Senaya (yellow card) 82'	Stadium: Stade Pierre-Mauroy; Attendance: 39,516; Referee: Jérôme Brisard

28 September 2024 6	Le Havre	0–3	Lille	Le Havre
19:00 CEST (UTC+2)	Kechta (yellow card) 44'; Desmas (yellow card) 90+4'	Report	David 23', 35', 79'; André (yellow card) 68'; Ang. Gomes (penalty missed) 90+5'	Stadium: Stade Océane; Attendance: 21,369; Referee: Bastien Dechepy

5 October 2024 7	Lille	2–1	Toulouse	Villeneuve-d'Ascq
19:00 CEST (UTC+2)	And. Gomes (yellow card) 8'; Alexsandro (yellow card) 15'; Ang. Gomes 57'; Bakker 72'; Tiago Santos (yellow card) 90+7'	Report	Aboukhlal 39'; Sidibé (yellow card) 44'; Magri (yellow card) 90+3'	Stadium: Stade Pierre-Mauroy; Attendance: 36,947; Referee: Clément Turpin

18 October 2024 8	Monaco	0–0	Lille	Monaco
20:45 CEST (UTC+2)	Teze (yellow card) 41', (red card) 61'	Report	Bouaddi (yellow card) 11'; Meunier (yellow card) 34'; Alexsandro (yellow card) 44'; Sahraoui (yellow card) 70'; Bayo (yellow card) 90+4'	Stadium: Stade Louis II; Attendance: 7,263; Referee: Eric Wattellier

26 October 2024 9	Lens	0–2	Lille	Lens
21:00 CEST (UTC+2)	Thomasson (yellow card) 13'; Pouilly (yellow card) 65'; Gradit (yellow card) 86'; Nzola (yellow card) 90+10'	Report	Gudmundsson (yellow card) 20'; Meunier (yellow card) 75'; Mandi (yellow card) 89'; David 90+8' (pen.), (yellow card) 90+9'; Bayo 90+11'	Stadium: Stade Bollaert-Delelis; Attendance: 38,223; Referee: Benoît Bastien

1 November 2024 10	Lille	1–1	Lyon	Villeneuve-d'Ascq
21:00 CET (UTC+1)	David 17'; Zhegrova (yellow card) 43'; Mukau (yellow card) 57'; André (yellow card) 90+2'	Report	Ćaleta-Car (yellow card) 30'; Fofana 90+1'	Stadium: Stade Pierre-Mauroy; Attendance: 45,084; Referee: Jérôme Brisard

10 November 2024 11	Nice	2–2	Lille	Nice
15:00 CET (UTC+1)	Clauss (yellow card) 37'; Diop 56', (yellow card) 85'; Louchet 90+6'	Report	Fernandez-Pardo 17'; Bakker 66'; David (yellow card) 86'; Ang. Gomes (yellow card) 90+5'	Stadium: Allianz Riviera; Attendance: 25,063; Referee: Jérémy Stinat

24 November 2024 12	Lille	1–0	Rennes	Villeneuve-d'Ascq
15:00 CET (UTC+1)	Mandi (yellow card) 40'; Zhegrova 45'; Alexsandro (yellow card) 48'; Fernandez-Pardo (yellow card) 90+2'	Report	Nagida (yellow card) 23'; Østigård (yellow card) 90+4'	Stadium: Stade Pierre-Mauroy; Attendance: 46,019; Referee: Mathieu Vernice

1 December 2024 13	Montpellier	2–2	Lille	Montpellier
15:00 CET (UTC+1)	Maksimović (yellow card) 9'; Tchato (yellow card) 35'; Sylla 45+2'; Savanier (yellow card) 52'; Sagnan (yellow card) 83'; Nordin 90+3'; Coulibaly (red card) 90+9'	Report	Mukau (yellow card) 26'; David 44' (pen.), 54' (pen.); Alexsandro (yellow card) 47'; Cabella (yellow card) 52'; Fernandez-Pardo (yellow card) 89'; Bakker (red card) 90+9'; Haraldsson (yellow card) 90+13'	Stadium: Stade de la Mosson; Attendance: 13,691; Referee: Benoît Millot

6 December 2024 14	Lille	3–1	Brest	Villeneuve-d'Ascq
19:00 CET (UTC+1)	David 7' (pen.), 69'; Haraldsson 44'; André (yellow card) 80'	Report	Le Cardinal (yellow card) 6'; Ajorque 48'	Stadium: Stade Pierre-Mauroy; Attendance: 38,128; Referee: Benoît Bastien

14 December 2024 15	Marseille	1–1	Lille	Marseille
17:00 CET (UTC+1)	Merlin 17'; Højbjerg (yellow card) 86'; Lirola (red card) 90+5'	Report	Diakité (yellow card) 63', (goal) 87'; And. Gomes (yellow card) 90+2'; André (yellow card) 90+2'	Stadium: Stade Vélodrome; Attendance: 64,380; Referee: Willy Delajod

4 January 2025 16	Lille	1–1	Nantes	Villeneuve-d'Ascq
19:00 CET (UTC+1)	Gudmundsson 40'; Haraldsson (yellow card) 77'	Report	Abline 70' (pen.); Cozza (yellow card) 72'; Castelletto (yellow card) 88'	Stadium: Stade Pierre-Mauroy; Attendance: 41,635; Referee: Jérémie Pignard

10 January 2025 17	Auxerre	0–0	Lille	Auxerre
21:00 CET (UTC+1)	Joly (red card) 56'	Report	André (yellow card) 12'; David (yellow card) 15', (penalty missed) 58'; And. Gomes (yellow card) 55'; Alexsandro (yellow card) 90+8'	Stadium: Stade de l'Abbé-Deschamps; Attendance: 15,599; Referee: Gaël Angoula

17 January 2025 18	Lille	2–1	Nice	Villeneuve-d'Ascq
21:00 CET (UTC+1)	André (yellow card) 34'; Haraldsson 48'; Diakité 63'	Report	Diop 29'; Clauss (yellow card) 42'; Boudaoui (yellow card) 83'; Ndombele (yellow card) 88'	Stadium: Stade Pierre-Mauroy; Attendance: 38,325; Referee: François Letexier

25 January 2025 19	Strasbourg	2–1	Lille	Strasbourg
19:00 CET (UTC+1)	Doukouré (yellow card) 19'; Andrey Santos (yellow card) 37', (goal) 70'; Diarra (yellow card) 64'; Ouattara (yellow card) 65'; Emegha 74'	Report	Sahraoui 8'; Gudmundsson (yellow card) 33'; Bakker (yellow card) 76'	Stadium: Stade de la Meinau; Attendance: 19,428; Referee: Willy Delajod

1 February 2025 20	Lille	4–1	Saint-Étienne	Villeneuve-d'Ascq
21:05 CET (UTC+1)	David 32' (pen.); Gudmundsson (yellow card) 62', (goal) 72'; Sahraoui 63', 78'	Report	Davitashvili 6' (pen.); Batubinsika (red card) 48'; Boakye (yellow card) 50'	Stadium: Stade Pierre-Mauroy; Attendance: 38,924; Referee: Eric Wattellier

8 February 2025 21	Lille	1–2	Le Havre	Villeneuve-d'Ascq
19:00 CET (UTC+1)	Mbappé (yellow card) 61'; Bakker (yellow card) 69'; Akpom 90+7'	Report	Hassan 38'; Soumaré 56'; Zouaoui (yellow card) 67'	Stadium: Stade Pierre-Mauroy; Attendance: 39,515; Referee: Thomas Léonard

16 February 2025 22	Rennes	0–2	Lille	Rennes
20:45 CET (UTC+1)	Wooh (yellow card) 42', (red card) 74'; Cissé (yellow card) 60'	Report	Ismaily (yellow card) 37'; Akpom (penalty missed) 44', 86'; Bentaleb 80'	Stadium: Roazhon Park; Attendance: 27,627; Referee: Romain Lissorgue

22 February 2025 23	Lille	2–1	Monaco	Villeneuve-d'Ascq
17:00 CET (UTC+1)	Haraldsson 22', 42'; David (yellow card) 73'; André (yellow card) 73'; Fernandez-Pardo (yellow card) 89'; Alexsandro (yellow card) 90+2'	Report	Zakaria (yellow card) 19'; Minamino 45+1'; Diatta (yellow card) 58'	Stadium: Stade Pierre-Mauroy; Attendance: 44,177; Referee: Benoît Bastien

1 March 2025 24	Paris Saint-Germain	4–1	Lille	Paris
21:05 CET (UTC+1)	Barcola 6'; Marquinhos 22'; Dembélé 28'; Doué 37'	Report	Meunier (yellow card) 39'; David 80'; Ismaily (yellow card) 90+2'	Stadium: Parc des Princes; Attendance: 47,838; Referee: François Letexier

8 March 2025 25	Lille	1–0	Montpellier	Villeneuve-d'Ascq
19:00 CET (UTC+1)	Alexsandro (yellow card) 9'; David 50'; Diakité (yellow card) 84'	Report	Nzingoula (yellow card) 36'; Sainte-Luce (yellow card) 71'; Kouyaté (yellow card) 78'	Stadium: Stade Pierre-Mauroy; Attendance: 42,467; Referee: Jérémie Pignard

15 March 2025 26	Nantes	1–0	Lille	Nantes
17:00 CEST (UTC+2)	Chirivella (yellow card) 12'; Simon (yellow card) 54'; Castelletto (red card) 74'; Mohamed 83'	Report	Mandi (yellow card) 57'; Haraldsson (yellow card) 66'; Bakker (yellow card) 67'	Stadium: Stade de la Beaujoire; Attendance: 28,621; Referee: Benoît Millot

30 March 2025 27	Lille	1–0	Lens	Villeneuve-d'Ascq
20:45 CEST (UTC+2)	Fernandez-Pardo 19'; Bouaddi (yellow card) 88'	Report	Aguilar (yellow card) 22'; El Aynaoui (yellow card) 51'; Medina (yellow card) 82'	Stadium: Stade Pierre-Mauroy; Attendance: 48,197; Referee: Mathieu Vernice

5 April 2025 28	Lyon	2–1	Lille	Décines-Charpieu
21:05 CEST (UTC+2)	Lacazette (yellow card) 22', (goal) 38' (pen.); Tolisso (yellow card) 25'; Cherki 70'; Maitland-Niles (yellow card) 77'	Report	Diakité 1', (yellow card) 72'; André (yellow card) 56'	Stadium: Parc Olympique Lyonnais; Attendance: 53,771; Referee: Eric Wattellier

12 April 2025 29	Toulouse	1–2	Lille	Toulouse
19:00 CEST (UTC+2)	Cresswell 42', (yellow card) 64'	Report	Fernandez-Pardo 21'; Bakker 45+4'; Alexsandro (yellow card) 71'; E. Mbappé (yellow card) 85'	Stadium: Stadium de Toulouse; Attendance: 25,936; Referee: Jérôme Brisard

20 April 2025 30	Lille	3–1	Auxerre	Villeneuve-d'Ascq
15:00 CEST (UTC+2)	Meunier 9'; Diakité (yellow card) 22'; David 43', 90+7'	Report	Jubal (yellow card) 47'; Massengo (yellow card) 61'; Alexsandro 90+2' (o.g.)	Stadium: Stade Pierre-Mauroy; Attendance: 45,929; Referee: Thomas Léonard

27 April 2025 31	Angers	0–2	Lille	Angers
15:00 CEST (UTC+2)	Belkhdim (yellow card) 61'	Report	Diakité (yellow card) 18' (yellow-red card) 67'; Alexsandro 45+1'; Haraldsson 50'; Fernandez-Pardo (yellow card) 57'; Meunier (yellow card) 58'; André (yellow card) 83'	Stadium: Stade Raymond Kopa; Attendance: 12,782; Referee: Hakim Ben El Hadj

4 May 2025 32	Lille	1–1	Marseille	Villeneuve-d'Ascq
20:45 CEST (UTC+2)	Ismaily (yellow card) 65'; Fernandez-Pardo 74'; Alexsandro (yellow card) 79'	Report	Bennacer (yellow card) 29'; Gouiri 57'; Garcia (yellow card) 73'	Stadium: Stade Pierre-Mauroy; Attendance: 48,284; Referee: Eric Wattellier

10 May 2025 33	Brest	2–0	Lille	Brest
21:00 CEST (UTC+2)	Ajorque 42'; Doumbia 64'; Pereira Lage (yellow card) 70'	Report	Meunier (yellow card) 40'	Stadium: Stade Francis-Le Blé; Attendance: 14,556; Referee: Thomas Léonard

17 May 2025 34	Lille	2–1	Reims	Villeneuve-d'Ascq
21:00 CEST (UTC+2)	Cabella 37'; Akpom 86' (pen.)	Report	Akieme 60'; Okumu (yellow card) 84'	Stadium: Stade Pierre-Mauroy; Attendance: 45,599; Referee: Willy Delajod

=== Coupe de France ===
20 December 2024 Round of 64	Rouen	0–1	Lille	Le Petit-Quevilly
21:00 CET (UTC+1)	Mbondi (yellow card) 38'; Mbock (yellow card) 45+1'; Goprou (yellow card) 55'; Benzia (red card) 90+4'	Report	Ismaily 22'; Bakker (yellow card) 34'	Stadium: Stade Robert Diochon; Attendance: 8,016; Referee: Stéphanie Frappart

14 January 2025 Round of 32	Marseille	1–1 (3–4 p)	Lille	Marseille
21:10 CET (UTC+1)	Maupay (yellow card) 62'; Luis Henrique 90+6'	Report	Bakker (yellow card) 54'; Haraldsson 68'; Diakité (yellow card) 90'	Stadium: Stade Vélodrome; Attendance: 61,954; Referee: Clément Turpin
	Penalties
	Greenwood (penalty scored); Luis Henrique (penalty missed); Balerdi (penalty scored); Rabiot (penalty scored); Rowe (penalty missed)		(penalty scored) Bakker; (penalty scored) Ismaily; (penalty scored) And. Gomes; (penalty scored) Alexsandro

4 February 2025 Round of 16	Lille	1–1 (4–5 p)	Dunkerque	Villeneuve-d'Ascq
19:00 CET (UTC+1)	Alexsandro (yellow card) 59'; Haraldsson (yellow card) 65'; And. Gomes 85'	Report	Sanganté (yellow card) 59'; Senneville (yellow card) 76'; Tejan 90+6', (yellow card) 90+7'	Stadium: Stade Pierre-Mauroy; Attendance: 33,715; Referee: Benoît Millot
	Penalties
	Mbappé (penalty scored); Bakker (penalty scored); And. Gomes (penalty scored); Alexsandro (penalty missed); Haraldsson (penalty missed); Akpom (penalty scored); André (penalty missed)		(penalty missed) Courtet; (penalty missed) Bardeli; (penalty scored) Sanganté; (penalty scored) Georgen; (penalty scored) Sekongo; (penalty scored) Senneville; (penalty scored) Jaouen

=== UEFA Champions League ===
==== Third qualifying round ====
The draw for the third qualifying round was held on 22 July 2024.

6 August 2024 First leg	Lille (France)	2–1	(Turkey) Fenerbahçe	Valenciennes, France
20:30 CEST (UTC+2)	Santos 12', (yellow card) 45+1'; Alexsandro (yellow card) 79'; Zhegrova 90+1'	Report	Džeko (yellow card) 9'; Kadıoğlu (yellow card) 45+1'; Kahveci 80'	Stadium: Stade du Hainaut; Attendance: 12,908; Referee: István Kovács (Romania)
Note: The match was played at the Stade du Hainaut in Valenciennes, instead of Lille's regular stadium, the Stade Pierre-Mauroy in Villeneuve-d'Ascq, as it was being used for the 2024 Summer Olympics.

13 August 2024 Second leg	Fenerbahçe (Turkey)	1–1 (a.e.t.) (2–3 agg.)	(France) Lille	Istanbul, Turkey
20:00 TRT (UTC+3)	Müldür (yellow card) 8'; Djiku (yellow card) 65'; Söyüncü (yellow card) 68'; Diakité 90+1' (o.g.); Oosterwolde (yellow card) 120+3'	Report	Alexsandro (yellow card) 35'; Zhegrova (yellow card) 80'; Mandi (red card) 109'; David 118' (pen.)	Stadium: Şükrü Saracoğlu Stadium; Attendance: 40,474; Referee: José María Sánchez Martínez (Spain)

==== Play-off round ====
The draw for the play-off round was held on 5 August 2024.

20 August 2024 First leg	Lille (France)	2–0	(Czech Republic) Slavia Prague	Valenciennes, France
21:00 CEST (UTC+2)	Meunier (yellow card) 12'; David 52'; Zhegrova 77'; Diakité (yellow card) 89'; Ilić (yellow card) 90+5'	Report	Masopust (yellow card) 35'; Dorley (yellow card) 66'	Stadium: Stade du Hainaut; Attendance: 15,019; Referee: Szymon Marciniak (Poland)
Note: The match was played at the Stade du Hainaut in Valenciennes, instead of Lille's regular stadium, the Stade Pierre-Mauroy in Villeneuve-d'Ascq, as it was being used for the 2024 Summer Olympics.

28 August 2024 Second leg	Slavia Prague (Czech Republic)	2–1 (2–3 agg.)	(France) Lille	Prague, Czech Republic
21:00 CEST (UTC+2)	Zafeiris 5'; Ogbu (yellow card) 17'; Diouf (yellow card) 41'; Bořil (yellow card) 50'; Schranz 84'	Report	Haraldsson (yellow card) 42'; Santos (yellow card) 44'; Zhegrova 77'	Stadium: Fortuna Arena; Attendance: 18,848; Referee: Slavko Vinčić (Slovenia)

==== League phase ====
The draw for the league phase was held on 29 August 2024.

Pos	Team	Pld	W	D	L	GF	GA	GD	Pts	Qualification
5	(Royal Spanish Football Federation) Atlético Madrid	8	6	0	2	20	12	+8	18	Advance to round of 16 (seeded)
6	(German Football Association) Bayer Leverkusen	8	5	1	2	15	7	+8	16	Advance to round of 16 (seeded)
7	(French Football Federation) Lille	8	5	1	2	17	10	+7	16	Advance to round of 16 (seeded)
8	(The Football Association) Aston Villa	8	5	1	2	13	6	+7	16	Advance to round of 16 (seeded)
9	(Italian Football Federation) Atalanta	8	4	3	1	20	6	+14	15	Advance to knockout phase play-offs (seeded)

Source: UEFA
Rules for classification: League phase tiebreakers

Round	1	2	3	4	5	6	7	8
Ground	A	H	A	H	A	H	A	H
Result	L	W	W	D	W	W	L	W
Position	30	18	15	14	12	8	12	7
Points	0	3	6	7	10	13	13	16

Source: UEFA
A = Away; H = Home; W = Win; D = Draw; L = Loss

17 September 2024 1	Sporting CP (Portugal)	2–0	(France) Lille	Lisbon, Portugal
20:00 WEST (UTC+1)	Gyökeres 38'; Morita (yellow card) 45+1'; Debast 65', (yellow card) 86'	Report	Ang. Gomes (yellow card) 21' (yellow-red card) 40'; David (yellow card) 40'; André (yellow card) 56'; Bouaddi (yellow card) 72'	Stadium: Estádio José Alvalade; Attendance: 40,024; Referee: Donatas Rumšas (Lithuania)

2 October 2024 2	Lille (France)	1–0	(Spain) Real Madrid	Villeneuve-d'Ascq, France
21:00 CEST (UTC+2)	David 45+3' (pen.), (yellow card) 90+3'; Diakité (yellow card) 90+6'	Report	Endrick (yellow card) 46'; Camavinga (yellow card) 59'; Bellingham (yellow card) 78'; Rüdiger (yellow card) 79'; Modrić (yellow card) 81'	Stadium: Stade Pierre-Mauroy; Attendance: 48,205; Referee: Maurizio Mariani (Italy)

23 October 2024 3	Atlético Madrid (Spain)	1–3	(France) Lille	Madrid, Spain
21:00 CEST (UTC+2)	Alvarez 8'; Galán (yellow card) 17'; Giménez (yellow card) 78'; Witsel (yellow card) 88'	Report	Touré (yellow card) 44'; Zhegrova 61'; David 74' (pen.), 89'; Meunier (yellow card) 78'	Stadium: Metropolitano Stadium; Attendance: 61,197; Referee: Marco Guida (Italy)

5 November 2024 4	Lille (France)	1–1	(Italy) Juventus	Villeneuve-d'Ascq, France
21:00 CET (UTC+1)	David 27'; André (yellow card) 73'	Report	Vlahović 60' (pen.); Cabal (yellow card) 62'	Stadium: Stade Pierre-Mauroy; Attendance: 48,312; Referee: Irfan Peljto (Bosnia and Herzegovina)

27 November 2024 5	Bologna (Italy)	1–2	(France) Lille	Bologna, Italy
21:00 CET (UTC+1)	Lykogiannis (yellow card) 33'; Lucumí 63'; Odgaard (yellow card) 84'; Castro (yellow card) 90+6'	Report	Alexsandro (yellow card) 22'; Mukau 44', 66'; Meunier (yellow card) 54'; Mandi (yellow card) 80'; Zhegrova (yellow card) 90+5'	Stadium: Stadio Renato Dall'Ara; Attendance: 22,420; Referee: Michael Oliver (England)

11 December 2024 6	Lille (France)	3–2	(Austria) Sturm Graz	Villeneuve-d'Ascq, France
18:45 CET (UTC+1)	Sahroaui 37'; Bakker 45+2', (yellow card) 74'; Haraldsson 81'	Report	Chukwuani (yellow card) 8'; Kiteishvili 45+4'; Biereth 47'	Stadium: Stade Pierre-Mauroy; Attendance: 45,796; Referee: Georgi Kabakov (Bulgaria)

21 January 2025 7	Liverpool (England)	2–1	(France) Lille	Liverpool, England
20:00 GMT (UTC±0)	Salah 34'; Elliott 67', (yellow card) 90+4'; Mac Allister (yellow card) 90+2'	Report	Mandi (yellow card) 35' (yellow-red card) 59'; David 62'; André (yellow card) 88'	Stadium: Anfield; Attendance: 59,782; Referee: Felix Zwayer (Germany)

29 January 2025 8	Lille (France)	6–1	(Netherlands) Feyenoord	Villeneuve-d'Ascq, France
21:00 CET (UTC+1)	Sahraoui 4'; Trauner 38', 76' (o.g.); Ang. Gomes 57'; Chevalier (yellow card) 62'; Mukau (yellow card) 65'; David 74'; Cabella 80', (yellow card) 80'	Report	Giménez 14'; Trauner (yellow card) 43'	Stadium: Stade Pierre-Mauroy; Attendance: 44,071; Referee: Slavko Vinčić (Slovenia)

==== Knockout phase ====
===== Round of 16 =====
The draw for the round of 16 was held on 21 February 2025.

4 March 2025 First leg	Borussia Dortmund (Germany)	1–1	(France) Lille	Dortmund, Germany
21:00 CET (UTC+1)	Adeyemi 22'; Can (yellow card) 61'; Groß (yellow card) 90+3'	Report	Haraldsson 68'	Stadium: Westfalenstadion; Attendance: 81,365; Referee: José María Sánchez Martínez (Spain)

12 March 2025 Second leg	Lille (France)	1–2 (2–3 agg.)	(Germany) Borussia Dortmund	Villeneuve-d'Ascq, France
18:45 CET (UTC+1)	David 5'; Meunier (yellow card) 52'; Mukau (yellow card) 83'	Report	Anton (yellow card) 32'; Groß (yellow card) 51'; Can 54' (pen.); Beier 65'; Bensebaini (yellow card) 89'	Stadium: Stade Pierre-Mauroy; Attendance: 48,042; Referee: Sandro Schärer (Switzerland)

== Statistics ==
=== Appearances and goals ===
No.	Pos	Nat	Player	Total		Ligue 1		Coupe de France		Champions League	
No.	Pos	Nat	Player	Apps	Goals	Apps	Goals	Apps	Goals	Apps	Goals
Goalkeepers
1	GK	(Italy) ITA	Vito Mannone	3	0	0	0	3	0	0	0
16	GK	(France) FRA	Marc-Aurèle Caillard	0	0	0	0	0	0	0	0
30	GK	(France) FRA	Lucas Chevalier	48	0	34	0	0	0	14	0
Defenders
2	DF	(Algeria) ALG	Aïssa Mandi	31	0	20+4	0	1	0	4+2	0
4	DF	(Brazil) BRA	Alexsandro	47	1	30	1	2+1	0	14	0
5	DF	(Sweden) SWE	Gabriel Gudmundsson	45	2	20+10	2	1+1	0	9+4	0
12	DF	(Belgium) BEL	Thomas Meunier	46	2	21+9	2	3	0	11+2	0
14	DF	(France) FRA	Samuel Umtiti	0	0	0	0	0	0	0	0
18	DF	(France) FRA	Bafodé Diakité	48	4	31	4	3	0	13+1	0
20	DF	(Netherlands) NED	Mitchel Bakker	35	4	14+10	3	3	0	5+3	1
22	DF	(Portugal) POR	Tiago Santos	13	0	4+3	0	0	0	5+1	0
31	DF	(Brazil) BRA	Ismaily	24	1	10+6	0	1+1	1	3+3	0
Midfielders
6	MF	(Algeria) ALG	Nabil Bentaleb	10	1	3+7	1	0	0	0	0
7	MF	(Iceland) ISL	Hákon Arnar Haraldsson	38	8	21+4	5	2+1	1	7+3	2
8	MF	(England) ENG	Angel Gomes	20	2	10+4	1	0	0	5+1	1
10	MF	(France) FRA	Rémy Cabella	37	2	12+11	1	3	0	10+1	1
17	MF	(Democratic Republic of the Congo) COD	Ngal'ayel Mukau	36	2	14+8	0	3	0	6+5	2
21	MF	(France) FRA	Benjamin André	45	0	30	0	2	0	13	0
23	MF	(Kosovo) KOS	Edon Zhegrova	21	8	12	4	0	0	5+4	4
26	MF	(Portugal) POR	André Gomes	24	1	16+4	0	0+2	1	0+2	0
32	MF	(France) FRA	Ayyoub Bouaddi	36	0	11+13	0	1+2	0	7+2	0
34	MF	(France) FRA	Aaron Malouda	1	0	0+1	0	0	0	0	0
35	MF	(France) FRA	Adame Faïz	0	0	0	0	0	0	0	0
Forwards
9	FW	(Canada) CAN	Jonathan David	49	25	28+4	16	3	0	12+2	9
11	FW	(Morocco) MAR	Osame Sahraoui	46	5	10+20	3	2+1	0	5+8	2
19	FW	(Belgium) BEL	Matias Fernandez-Pardo	30	4	12+10	4	0+1	0	2+5	0
24	FW	(England) ENG	Chuba Akpom	16	3	6+8	3	0+1	0	0+1	0
29	FW	(France) FRA	Ethan Mbappé	14	0	1+9	0	0+1	0	1+2	0
33	FW	(France) FRA	Younes Lachaab	3	0	0+2	0	0	0	0+1	0
Players transferred/loaned out during the season
24	FW	(Serbia) SRB	Andrej Ilić	1	0	0	0	0	0	0+1	0
27	FW	(Guinea) GUI	Mohamed Bayo	17	2	4+8	2	0	0	2+3	0
36	DF	(France) FRA	Ousmane Touré	3	0	0+1	0	0	0	1+1	0

Source: Competitions
