= Ousmane Touré =

Ousmane Touré may refer to:

- Ousmane Touré (swimmer) (born 2002), Malian swimmer
- Ousmane Touré (footballer) (born 2005), French footballer
