= Félix Correia =

Portuguese footballer (born 2001)

Personal information
- Full name: Félix Alexandre Andrade Sanches Correia
- Date of birth: 22 January 2001 (age 25)
- Place of birth: Lisbon, Portugal
- Height: 1.80 m (5 ft 11 in)
- Position: Winger

Team information
- Current team: Sevilla (on loan from Lille)
- Number: 20

Youth career
- 2009–2010: CIF
- 2010–2019: Sporting CP

Senior career*
Years	Team	Apps	(Gls)
2019–2020	Manchester City	0	(0)
2019–2020	→ Jong AZ (loan)	23	(3)
2020–2024	Juventus	1	(0)
2020–2024	Juventus U23	28	(11)
2021–2022	→ Parma (loan)	21	(0)
2023	→ Marítimo (loan)	13	(2)
2023–2024	→ Gil Vicente (loan)	30	(5)
2024–2025	Gil Vicente	33	(9)
2025–	Lille	36	(4)
2026–	→ Sevilla (loan)	5	(1)

International career^{‡}
2016	Portugal U15	2	(0)
2016–2017	Portugal U16	5	(0)
2017–2018	Portugal U17	17	(6)
2018–2019	Portugal U18	5	(5)
2019	Portugal U19	21	(3)
Medal record
Men's football
Representing Portugal
UEFA European Under-19 Championship
Runner-up	2019 Armenia
- * Club domestic league appearances and goals as of 23:44, 18 October 2026 (UTC) ‡ National team caps and goals as of 17:16, 8 November 2025 (UTC)

Félix Alexandre Andrade Sanches Correia (born 22 January 2001) is a Portuguese professional footballer who plays as a winger for La Liga club Sevilla, on loan from Ligue 1 club Lille.

== Club career ==
=== Manchester City ===
Manchester City loaned Correia to Jong AZ for the 2019–20 season. On 23 August 2019, he made his Eerste Divisie debut for Jong AZ against TOP Oss. Correia ended the season with 23 appearances, scoring three goals and providing five assists.

=== Juventus U23 ===
On 30 June 2020, Juventus agreed to sign Correia on a five-year deal, on a swap deal with Pablo Moreno heading the other way. Correia scored his first goal and made his first assist for Juventus U23 on his Serie C debut, on 28 September 2020, against Pro Sesto, helping his side win 2–1.

=== Juventus ===
==== Senior debut ====
Correia was first called-up for the first team on 13 January 2021, in a Coppa Italia game against Genoa. He made his senior debut on 2 May, coming off the bench for Juan Cuadrado in the 83rd minute in a 2–1 league win against Udinese.

==== Loan to Parma ====
On 13 August 2021, Correia was loaned to Serie B side Parma with an option to buy. On 12 September, Correia debuted for Parma in a 4–0 win against Pordenone.

==== Loan to Marítimo ====
On 31 January 2023, Correia was loaned to Marítimo for the rest of the season. Pablo Moreno was also playing for Marítimo at the time; Moreno and Correia were swapped for each other three years earlier.

Marítimo finished the season in 16th place, leading them to face Estrela da Amadora (who had finished 3rd in the Liga Portugal 2) in the relegation play-off. After a 3–3 draw (aggregate score over two legs), the game went to a penalty shootout. Correia missed the decisive penalty and Marítimo was relegated to the second division for the first time in 38 years.

==== Loan to Gil Vicente ====
On 22 August 2023, Correia returned to Portugal in another new season-long loan to a Primeira Liga club, this time Gil Vicente.

=== Gil Vicente ===
On 2 July 2024, Correia signed with Gil Vicente on a permanent contract for the next four seasons.

=== Lille ===
On 17 July 2025, Correia moved to Ligue 1 side Lille in France on a four-year contract. Later that year, on 26 October, he scored his first goal for the club in a 6–1 victory over Metz.

==== Loan to Sevilla ====
On 1 September 2026, Correia joined La Liga club Sevilla on loan for the 2026–27 season.

== Career statistics ==
As of match played 18 October 2026

Appearances and goals by club, season and competition
Club	Season	League			National cup		Europe		Other		Total	
Club	Season	Division	Apps	Goals	Apps	Goals	Apps	Goals	Apps	Goals	Apps	Goals
Manchester City	2019–20	Premier League	0	0	0	0	0	0	0	0	0	0
Jong AZ (loan)	2019–20	Eerste Divisie	23	3	—		—		—		23	3
Juventus	2020–21	Serie A	1	0	0	0	0	0	0	0	1	0
Juventus U23	2020–21	Serie C	28	11	—		—		2 (Note: Appearances in Serie C promotion play-offs)	1	30	12
Parma (loan)	2021–22	Serie B	21	0	0	0	—		—		21	0
Marítimo (loan)	2022–23	Primeira Liga	13	2	0	0	—		2 (Note: Appearances in Primeira Liga relegation play-offs)	0	15	2
Gil Vicente (loan)	2023–24	Primeira Liga	30	5	4	0	—		—		34	5
Gil Vicente	2024–25	Primeira Liga	33	9	4	1	—		—		37	10
Lille	2025–26	Ligue 1	34	4	2	0	12 (Note: Appearances in UEFA Europa League)	1	—		48	5
Lille	2026–27	Ligue 1	2	0	—		—		—		2	0
Lille	Total		36	4	2	0	12	1	—		50	5
Sevilla (loan)	2026–27	La Liga	5	1	0	0	—		—		5	1
Career total			190	35	10	1	12	1	4	1	216	38

== Honours ==
Portugal U19

- UEFA European Under-19 Championship runner-up: 2019

Individual

- UEFA European Under-19 Championship Team of the Tournament: 2019
