= Alexsandro (footballer, born 1999) =

Brazilian footballer

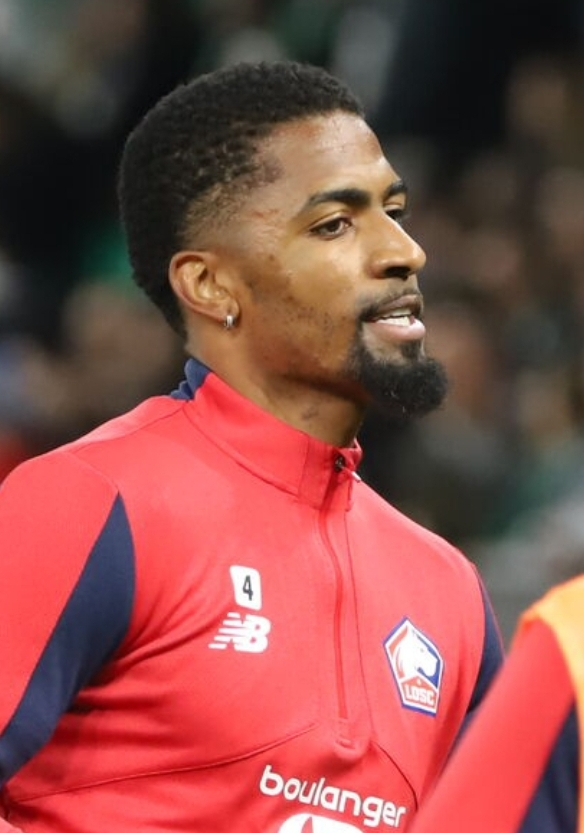
- Alexsandro with Lille in 2024

Personal information
- Full name: Alexsandro Victor de Souza Ribeiro
- Date of birth: 9 August 1999 (age 27)
- Place of birth: Duque de Caxias, Rio de Janeiro, Brazil
- Height: 1.89 m (6 ft 2 in)
- Position: Centre-back

Team information
- Current team: Lille
- Number: 4

Youth career
- 2014–2016: Flamengo
- 2017–2018: Resende

Senior career*
Years	Team	Apps	(Gls)
2019–2020	Praiense	30	(3)
2020–2021	Amora	24	(0)
2021–2022	Chaves	31	(3)
2022–	Lille	97	(4)

International career^{‡}
2025–	Brazil	3	(0)
- * Club domestic league appearances and goals as of 30 October 2026 ‡ National team caps and goals as of 9 September 2025

Alexsandro Victor de Souza Ribeiro (born 9 August 1999), known simply as Alexsandro (Brazilian Portuguese: [alekˈsɐ̃dɾu]) is a Brazilian professional footballer who plays as a centre-back for Ligue 1 club Lille and the Brazil national team. After being called up for the Brazil national team for the first time in June 2025, he began to be called Alex Ribeiro by the Brazilian media to differentiate him from his teammate Alex Sandro.

== Early life ==
Born in Duque de Caxias, Rio de Janeiro, Alexsandro lived in the Jardim Gramacho neighborhood as a youth, as the oldest of five brothers. He began playing for the youth categories of Flamengo in 2014, but left the club in December 2016.

In 2017, after several failed trials at clubs such as Botafogo, Fluminense and Vasco da Gama, Alexsandro joined the youth sides of Resende.

== Club career ==
=== Praiense ===
Alexsandro was brought to Portugal in January 2019, and joined third tier side Praiense. He made his senior debut on 27 January of that year, coming on as a late substitute for goalscorer Danny Esteves in a 3–1 Campeonato de Portugal home win over Sporting Ideal.

Alexsandro became a regular starter for Praiense during the 2019–20 season, as the club won their group but missed out promotion after being the third-best champion of the four groups (only the first two were promoted).

=== Amora ===
In September 2020, after a failed move to Vitória de Setúbal, Alexsandro was presented at Amora also in the third division. An immediate first-choice, he helped the club to qualify to the newly-created Liga 3.

=== Chaves ===
On 21 June 2021, Alexsandro was announced at Liga Portugal 2 side Chaves. He made his professional debut on 7 August, starting and scoring the equalizer in a 2–2 away draw against Varzim.

Alexsandro was again a first-choice for his new side, making 34 appearances and scoring three goals and helping them earn promotion to the Primeira Liga. He was also named in the Team of the Season.

=== Lille ===
On 1 July 2022, Ligue 1 club Lille announced the signing of Alexsandro on a four-year deal. He made his club debut on 7 August, starting in a 4–1 home routing of Auxerre.

Alexsandro scored his first goal for the Dogues on 23 October 2022, netting the opener in a 4–3 home win over Monaco. On 15 January 2024, after establishing himself as a starter, he renewed his contract until 2028.

== International career ==
On 26 May 2025, Alexsandro received his first call-up to the Brazil national team by new coach Carlo Ancelotti; he became the first Lille player to receive a call-up to the national side.

== Career statistics ==
=== Club ===
As of match played 30 October 2026

Appearances and goals by club, season and competition
Club	Season	League			National cup (Note: Includes Taça de Portugal, Coupe de France)		League cup (Note: Includes Taça da Liga)		Europe		Other		Total	
Club	Season	Division	Apps	Goals	Apps	Goals	Apps	Goals	Apps	Goals	Apps	Goals	Apps	Goals
Praiense	2018–19	Campeonato de Portugal	10	0	—		—		—		—		10	0
Praiense	2019–20	Campeonato de Portugal	20	3	0	0	—		—		—		20	3
Praiense	Total		30	3	0	0	—		—		—		30	3
Amora	2020–21	Campeonato de Portugal	24	0	2	0	—		—		—		26	0
Chaves	2021–22	Liga Portugal 2	31	3	0	0	1	0	—		2 (Note: Appearances in Liga Portugal 2 promotion play-offs)	0	34	3
Lille	2022–23	Ligue 1	21	3	2	0	—		—		—		23	3
Lille	2023–24	Ligue 1	29	0	2	1	—		11 (Note: Appearances in UEFA Europa Conference League)	0	—		42	1
Lille	2024–25	Ligue 1	30	1	3	0	—		14 (Note: Appearances in UEFA Champions League)	0	—		47	1
Lille	2025–26	Ligue 1	9	0	0	0	—		2 (Note: Appearances in UEFA Europa League)	0	—		11	0
Lille	2026–27	Ligue 1	8	0	0	0	—		3	1	—		11	1
Lille	Total		97	4	7	1	—		30	1	—		134	6
Career total			181	10	9	1	1	0	30	1	2	0	223	12

=== International ===
As of match played 9 September 2025

Appearances and goals by national team and year
National team	Year	Apps	Goals
Brazil	2025	3	0
Total		3	0

== Honours ==
Individual

- Liga Portugal 2 Team of the Season: 2021–22
- Liga Portugal 2 Defender of the Month: January 2022
