= Pablo Moreno =

Spanish footballer (born 2002)

Personal information
- Full name: Pablo Moreno Taboada
- Date of birth: 3 May 2002 (age 24)
- Place of birth: Granada, Spain
- Height: 1.80 m (5 ft 11 in)
- Position: Forward

Team information
- Current team: Marbella
- Number: 11

Youth career
- 2010–2013: Ciudad de Granada
- 2013–2018: Barcelona
- 2018–2020: Juventus

Senior career*
Years	Team	Apps	(Gls)
2018–2020	Juventus U23	1	(0)
2020–2022	Manchester City	0	(0)
2020–2022	→ Girona (loan)	44	(3)
2022–2023	Marítimo	19	(0)
2023–2024	Andorra	10	(0)
2024–2025	Osasuna B	12	(1)
2026–	Marbella	3	(0)

International career
2017–2018	Spain U16	6	(2)
2019	Spain U17	12	(3)
2019–2020	Spain U18	3	(1)
- * Club domestic league appearances and goals as of 10 June 2026

Pablo Moreno Taboada (born 3 May 2002) is a Spanish professional footballer who plays as a forward for Primera Federación club Marbella.

== Club career ==
=== Juventus ===
On 27 July 2018, Moreno joined Italian club Juventus, after scoring more than 200 goals in 5 years for Barcelona youth teams. He made his Serie C debut for Juventus U23 on 18 November 2018 in a game against Pontedera as a 90th-minute substitute for Alessandro Di Pardo.

Moreno made his first bench appearance for Juventus' senior squad on 17 March 2019 in a Serie A game against Genoa.

=== Manchester City ===
On 30 June 2020, Manchester City agreed to sign Moreno on a four-year deal, and to swap him with Félix Correia. On 18 September, he joined Girona in Segunda División on loan.

Upon returning, Moreno made his Manchester City debut on 27 July 2021, featuring as a substitute in a 2–0 friendly win against Preston North End. On 31 August, he returned to Girona on a one-year loan deal.

=== Marítimo ===
On 29 July 2022, Moreno was joined Portuguese Primeira Liga team Marítimo on a permanent contract, with Manchester City retaining the option to re-sign him with a "buy-back clause" included in the deal. Moreno made his Marítimo debut on 6 August, coming on as a late substitute in an away defeat to Porto on the opening day of the season. That season, Moreno made 22 appearances in all competitions for Marítimo, but never managed to find the back of the net. After finishing 16th in the Primeira Liga, Marítimo faced Estrela da Amadora in the relegation/promotion play-offs, where the Madeira club was defeated in a penalty shootout, being relegated to the Liga Portugal 2 for the first time in 38 years.

On 8 August 2023, Marítimo announced that Moreno's contract had been terminated by mutual agreement.

=== Andorra ===
On 10 August 2023, Moreno returned to Spain and its second division, after signing a two-year deal with FC Andorra.

=== Osasuna B ===
On 27 July 2024, Moreno joined Primera Federación – Group B club Osasuna B on an initial one-year deal with the option to extend.

=== Marbella ===
On 23 January 2026, Moreno signed with Marbella in Primera Federación until the end of the 2025–26 season.
