= Isaac Cossier =

French footballer

Personal information
- Date of birth: November 30, 2006 (age 19)
- Place of birth: Clichy-sous-Bois, France
- Height: 1.93 m (6 ft 4 in)
- Position: Centre-back

Team information
- Current team: LOSC Lille
- Number: 26

Youth career
- Olympique Noisy-le-Sec
- Drancy
- Lille

Senior career*
Years	Team	Apps	(Gls)
2024–2025	Lille II	17	(1)
2025–	Lille	3	(0)
2025–2026	→ Le Mans (loan)	24	(1)
- * Club domestic league appearances and goals as of 23:00, 30 October 2026 (UTC)

Isaac Cossier (born 30 November 2006) is a French professional footballer who plays as a centre-back for Ligue 1 club LOSC Lille.

== Club career ==
Cossier is a product of the youth academies of the French clubs Olympique Noisy-le-Sec and Drancy, before moving to Lille on 26 July 2022 where he signed a professional contract until 2025. In 2024, he was promoted to Lille's reserves in the Championnat National 2. On 2 September 2025, his contract with Lille was extended until 2027, and he was loaned to newly promoted side Ligue 2 side Le Mans on a season-long loan. He was named the "Ligue 2 Young Player of the Season" and helped Le Mans earn promotion to Ligue 1. He returned to Lille in the summer of 2026, and on 17 July 2026 extended his contract with the club until 2030.

== Career statistics ==
As of match played 3 November 2026

Appearances and goals by club, season and competition
Club	Season	League			Coupe de France		Europe		Other		Total	
Club	Season	Division	Apps	Goals	Apps	Goals	Apps	Goals	Apps	Goals	Apps	Goals
Lille II	2024–25	Championnat National 1	16	1	—		—		—		16	1
Lille	2025–26	Ligue 1	0	0	0	0	0	0	—		0	0
Lille	2026–27	Ligue 1	3	0	0	0	1 (Note: Appearances in UEFA Champions League)	0	—		4	0
Lille	Total		3	0	0	0	1	0	—		4	0
Le Mans (loan)	2025–26	Ligue 2	24	1	4	0	—		—		28	1
Career total			43	2	4	0	1	0	0	0	48	2

== Honours ==
Individual

- 2025–26 Ligue 2 Young Player of the Season
