= Tiago Morais =

Portuguese footballer (born 2003)

Personal information
- Full name: Tiago Fontoura da Fonseca Morais
- Date of birth: 3 September 2003 (age 23)
- Place of birth: Espinho, Portugal
- Height: 1.68 m (5 ft 6 in)
- Position: Winger

Team information
- Current team: Lille

Youth career
- 2011–2013: Arcozelo
- 2013–2017: Boavista
- 2017–2018: Benfica
- 2018–2019: Padroense
- 2019–2020: Boavista

Senior career*
Years	Team	Apps	(Gls)
2020–2024	Boavista	36	(6)
2022–2023	→ Leixões (loan)	28	(3)
2024–	Lille	3	(0)
2024–2025	→ Rio Ave (loan)	31	(4)
2025–2026	→ Casa Pia (loan)	19	(0)

International career^{‡}
2021	Portugal U18	2	(0)
2021	Portugal U19	2	(0)
2023	Portugal U21	3	(0)
- * Club domestic league appearances and goals as of 18 May 2026 ‡ National team caps and goals as of 18:40, 20 November 2023 (UTC)

Tiago Fontoura da Fonseca Morais (born 3 September 2003) is a Portuguese professional footballer who plays as a winger for Ligue 1 club Lille.

== Club career ==
=== Boavista ===
Morais made his professional debut with Boavista in a 4–1 Primeira Liga loss to Braga on 28 December 2020. At 17 years and 3 months old, Morais is the youngest debutant for Boavista in the Primeira Liga.

On 1 August 2021, Morais scored a brace in a 2–0 home victory over Portimonense, in the second round of the Taça da Liga; becoming Boavista's youngest ever goalscorer at 17 years and 332 days, breaking João Vieira Pinto's previous record.

On 23 August 2022, Morais signed a new contract with Boavista until 2026 and was sent on a season-long loan to Liga Portugal 2 club Leixões. Five days later, he made his debut for the Matosinhos side, coming off the bench to replace Kiki Silva in the final minutes of a 3–0 home victory over Nacional in the league. On 1 October 2022, Morais scored his first goal for Leixões, the second in a 5–0 thrashing away at Campeonato de Portugal side Vasco da Gama Vidigueira, in the second round of the Taça de Portugal. He scored his first league goal on 12 March 2023, in a 1–1 draw at home to Estrela da Amadora in the Liga Portugal 2.

After returning from his loan at Leixões, Morais scored his first Primeira Liga goal for Boavista on 19 August 2023, in a 4–1 victory away at Portimonense.

=== Lille ===
On 30 January 2024, Morais signed a four-and-a-half-year contract with Ligue 1 club Lille. The French side paid a reported €4 million transfer fee.

In July 2024, Morais returned to Portugal, joining Rio Ave on a season-long loan deal.

On 8 August 2025, Morais was loaned to Casa Pia for the 2025–26 season.

== International career ==
Internationally, Morais has represented Portugal at U18 and U19 level. He made his debut for the U18s on 5 June 2021, coming on as a second-half substitute in a 2–1 home victory over Norway in a friendly game. On 3 September of the same year, Morais made his debut for the U19s, starting in a 2–0 home defeat to Belgium, again in a friendly.

== Career statistics ==
=== Club ===
As of match played 3 May 2026

Appearances and goals by club, season and competition
Club	Season	League			National cup (Note: Includes Taça de Portugal, Coupe de France)		League cup (Note: Includes Taça da Liga)		Europe		Total	
Club	Season	Division	Apps	Goals	Apps	Goals	Apps	Goals	Apps	Goals	Apps	Goals
Boavista	2020–21	Primeira Liga	4	0	0	0	0	0	—		4	0
Boavista	2021–22	Primeira Liga	13	0	1	0	2	2	—		16	2
Boavista	2022–23	Primeira Liga	2	0	—		—		—		2	0
Boavista	2023–24	Primeira Liga	17	6	2	0	1	0	—		20	6
Boavista	Total		36	6	3	0	3	2	—		42	8
Leixões (loan)	2022–23	Liga Portugal 2	28	3	4	1	1	0	—		33	4
Lille	2023–24	Ligue 1	3	0	1	0	—		0	0	4	0
Lille	2026–27	Ligue 1	0	0	0	0	—		0	0	0	0
Lille	Total		3	0	1	0	—		0	0	4	0
Rio Ave (loan)	2024–25	Primeira Liga	31	4	4	1	—		—		35	5
Casa Pia (loan)	2025–26	Primeira Liga	19	0	3	1	—		—		22	1
Career total			117	13	15	3	4	2	0	0	136	18
