= Soriba Diaoune =

French footballer (born 2007)

Personal information
- Date of birth: 14 August 2007 (age 19)
- Place of birth: Lille, France
- Height: 1.74 m (5 ft 9 in)
- Position: Winger

Team information
- Current team: Lille
- Number: 35

Youth career
- 2012–2015: Lille OMS Fives
- 2015–2024: Lille

Senior career*
Years	Team	Apps	(Gls)
2024–	Lille II	30	(8)
2025–	Lille	14	(2)

International career^{‡}
2023	Guinea U16	1	(0)
2024–2025	France U18	5	(0)
2026–	France U20	3	(0)
- * Club domestic league appearances and goals as of 19:54, 11 November 2026 (UTC) ‡ National team caps and goals as of 14:04, 3 October 2026 (UTC)

Soriba Diaoune (born 14 August 2007) is a French professional footballer who plays as a winger for Ligue 1 club Lille.

== Club career ==
Diaoune is a product of the youth academies of Lille OMS Fives and Lille. In 2024, he was promoted to Lille's reserves in the Championnat National 3. On 23 July 2025, he signed his first professional contract with Lille until 2025. He made his senior and professional debut as a substitute in a 2–0 UEFA Europa League win over Brann on 25 September 2025. On 14 December 2025, Diaoune scored his first Ligue 1 goal in a 4–3 victory over Auxerre.

== International career ==
Born in France, Diaoune is of Guinean descent and holds dual French and Guinean citizenship. He was called up to the Guinea U16s for the 2023 Montaigu Tournament. He was called up to the France U18s for friendlies in 2024.

== Career statistics ==
As of match played 8 November 2026

Appearances and goals by club, season and competition
Club	Season	League			Coupe de France		Europe		Other		Total	
Club	Season	Division	Apps	Goals	Apps	Goals	Apps	Goals	Apps	Goals	Apps	Goals
Lille II	2024–25	Championnat National 2	19	4	—		—		—		19	4
Lille II	2025–26	Championnat National 2	8	2	—		—		—		8	2
Lille II	2026–27	Championnat National 2	3	2	—		—		—		3	2
Lille II	Total		30	8	—		—		—		30	8
Lille	2025–26	Ligue 1	10	1	2	0	4 (Note: Appearances in UEFA Europa League)	0	—		16	1
Lille	2026–27	Ligue 1	4	1	0	0	3 (Note: Appearances in UEFA Champions League)	2	—		7	3
Lille	Total		14	2	2	0	7	2	—		23	4
Career total			44	10	2	0	7	2	0	0	53	12
