= Loun Srdanović =

Swiss footballer (born 2006)

Personal information
- Date of birth: 4 August 2006 (age 20)
- Place of birth: Geneva, Switzerland
- Height: 1.80 m (5 ft 11 in)
- Position: Right-back

Team information
- Current team: Lille
- Number: 2

Youth career
- 2015–2020: Meyrin
- 2020–2023: Servette

Senior career*
| Years | Team | Apps | (Gls) |
| 2023–2026 | Servette II | 15 | (0) |
| 2024–2026 | Servette | 13 | (0) |
| 2026– | Lille | 0 | (0) |

International career^{‡}
| 2022 | Switzerland U17 | 9 | (0) |
| 2022 | Switzerland U18 | 3 | (0) |
| 2024 | Switzerland U19 | 5 | (0) |
- * Club domestic league appearances and goals as of 17:04, 6 July 2026 (UTC) ‡ National team caps and goals as of 17:04, 6 July 2026 (UTC)

Loun Srdanović (born 4 August 2006) is a Swiss professional footballer who plays as a right-back for Lille in Ligue 1.

== Club career ==
Srdanović began his footballing career at Meyrin before joining the youth academy of neighbouring Servette FC at the age of 14. He progressed rapidly through the ranks at Servette's centre de formation and was integrated into the professional squad in the summer of 2024, at the age of 17. During the 2024–25 season, he made his senior competitive debut in the Swiss Super League and also featured on the bench in the UEFA Conference League, including fixtures against Chelsea. In the 2025–26 season, Srdanović established himself more prominently, earning the Servette Player of the Month award for August 2025. His progress was interrupted by injury, but he went on to make 16 appearances across all competitions under head coach Jocelyn Gourvennec, including five in European competition, featuring in the qualifying rounds of the UEFA Champions League, UEFA Europa League, and UEFA Conference League.

On 6 July 2026, Srdanović signed for Lille on a four-year contract until 2030.

== International career ==
Srdanović was born in Geneva to a Cameroonian mother and a father of Serbian, Croatian and German nationality. He has represented Switzerland at youth international level since 2022, progressing through the under-17 and under-19 sides. He made his international debut on 16 October 2022 with the Switzerland U17s against San Marino, and went on to become a regular member of the Switzerland U19 squad.

== Career statistics ==
As of match played 16 May 2026

Appearances and goals by club, season and competition
| Club | Season | League | | | Cup | | Europe | | Other | | Total | |
| Club | Season | Division | Apps | Goals | Apps | Goals | Apps | Goals | Apps | Goals | Apps | Goals |
|---|---|---|---|---|---|---|---|---|---|---|---|---|
| Servette II | 2023–24 | Promotion League | 4 | 0 | — | | — | | — | | 4 | 0 |
| Servette II | 2024–25 | 1. Liga Classic | 10 | 0 | — | | — | | — | | 10 | 0 |
| Servette II | 2025–26 | 1. Liga Classic | 1 | 0 | — | | — | | — | | 1 | 0 |
| Servette II | Total | | 15 | 0 | — | | — | | — | | 15 | 0 |
| Servette | 2024–25 | Swiss Super League | 2 | 0 | 1 | 0 | 0 | 0 | — | | 3 | 0 |
| Servette | 2025–26 | Swiss Super League | 11 | 0 | 0 | 0 | 4 (Note: Two appearances in UEFA Champions League, two appearances in UEFA Europa League) | 0 | — | | 15 | 0 |
| Servette | Total | | 13 | 0 | 1 | 0 | 4 | 0 | — | | 18 | 0 |
| Lille | 2026–27 | Ligue 1 | 0 | 0 | 0 | 0 | 0 | 0 | — | | 0 | 0 |
| Career total | | | 28 | 0 | 1 | 0 | 0 | 0 | 4 | 0 | 33 | 0 |
