= Ngal'ayel Mukau =

Footballer (born 2005)

Personal information
- Date of birth: 3 November 2004 (age 22)
- Place of birth: Mechelen, Belgium
- Height: 1.88 m (6 ft 2 in)
- Position: Midfielder

Team information
- Current team: Lille
- Number: 17

Youth career
- Mechelen
- 2018–2019: Zulte Waregem
- 2019–2023: Mechelen

Senior career*
Years	Team	Apps	(Gls)
2023–2024	Mechelen	35	(0)
2024–	Lille	61	(1)

International career^{‡}
2022	Belgium U18	1	(0)
2023	DR Congo U20	2	(0)
2024–	DR Congo	20	(0)
- * Club domestic league appearances and goals as of 23:00, 30 October 2026 (UTC) ‡ National team caps and goals as of 19:15, 28 September 2026 (UTC)

Ngal'ayel Mukau (born 3 November 2004) is a professional footballer who plays as a midfielder for Ligue 1 club Lille. Born in Belgium, he plays for the DR Congo national team.

== Club career ==
=== Mechelen ===
Mukau is a youth product of Mechelen and Zulte Waregem. On 20 July 2022, he signed his first professional contract with Mechelen for 2+1 seasons. He made his senior and professional debut with Mechelen in a 2–0 Belgian First Division A loss to Zulte Waregem on 8 January 2023.

=== Lille ===
On 11 July 2024, Mukau signed for French club Lille, on a four-year contract. The financial details of the transfer include an initial and base fee of €4 million and a maximum of €1 million add-ons depending on sporting conditions. On 27 November, he scored his first professional goals with a brace in a 2–1 win at Bologna in the 2024–25 UEFA Champions League league phase.

== International career ==
Born in Belgium, Mukau is of DR Congolese descent. Mukau holds both Congolese and French nationalities from his parents. He is a former youth international for Belgium, having played for the Belgium U18s. However, he was called up to a training camp for the DR Congo U21s in September 2023, and debuted with them in a pair of friendlies against the Tunisia U20s in October 2023.

On 16 November 2024, he made his debut for the DR Congo national team, coming on as a substitute in a 2025 Africa Cup of Nations qualification against Guinea.

On May 19, 2026, he was included in the 26-man squad selected by head coach Sébastien Desabre to represent the DR Congo at the 2026 FIFA World Cup.

== Career statistics ==
=== Club ===
As of match played 3 November 2026

Appearances and goals by club, season and competition
Club	Season	League			National Cup		Europe		Other		Total	
Club	Season	Division	Apps	Goals	Apps	Goals	Apps	Goals	Apps	Goals	Apps	Goals
Mechelen	2022–23	Belgian Pro League	9	0	0	0	—		—		9	0
Mechelen	2023–24	Belgian Pro League	26	0	1	0	—		1 (Note: Appearance in Belgian Supercup)	0	28	0
Mechelen	Total		35	0	1	0	—		1	0	37	0
Lille	2024–25	Ligue 1	22	0	2	0	11 (Note: Appearances in UEFA Champions League)	2	—		35	2
Lille	2025–26	Ligue 1	30	1	1	0	11 (Note: Appearances in UEFA Europa League)	1	—		42	2
Lille	2026–27	Ligue 1	9	0	0	0	4	0	—		13	0
Lille	Total		61	1	3	0	26	3	—		90	4
Career total			96	1	4	0	26	3	1	0	129	4

=== International ===
As of match played 28 September 2026

Appearances and goals by national team and year
National team	Year	Apps	Goals
DR Congo	2024	2	0
DR Congo	2025	8	0
DR Congo	2026	10	0
Total		20	0
