= Maxima Goffi =

French footballer (born 2008)

Personal information
- Full name: Adeagan Maxima Goffi
- Date of birth: 23 January 2008 (age 18)
- Place of birth: Villeneuve-d'Ascq, France
- Height: 1.87 m (6 ft 2 in)
- Position: Centre-back

Team information
- Current team: Lille
- Number: 38

Youth career
- 2016–2018: AS Hellemmes
- 2018–2025: Lille

Senior career*
Years	Team	Apps	(Gls)
2025–	Lille II	19	(2)
2025–	Lille	5	(0)
- * Club domestic league appearances and goals as of 23:02, 30 October 2026 (UTC) ‡ National team caps and goals as of 13:25, 27 October 2025 (UTC)

Adeagan Maxima Goffi (born 23 January 2008) is a French professional football player who plays as a centre-back for Ligue 1 club Lille.

== Club career ==
Goffi is a product of the youth academies of AS Hellemmes and Lille. In 2024, he was promoted to Lille's reserves in the Championnat National 3. On 15 May 2025, he signed his first professional contract with Lille until 2028. He made his senior and professional debut with Lille in a 3–3 Ligue 1 tie with Brest on 17 August 2025, becoming Lille's fourth youngest ever debutant.

== Personal life ==
Born in France, Goffi is of Central African descent.

== Career statistics ==
As of match played 30 October 2026

Appearances and goals by club, season, and competition
Club	Season	League			Coupe de France		Europe		Other		Total	
Club	Season	Division	Apps	Goals	Apps	Goals	Apps	Goals	Apps	Goals	Apps	Goals
Lille B	2024–25	CFA 2	8	1	—		—		—		8	1
Lille B	2025–26	CFA 2	8	1	—		—		—		8	1
Lille B	2026–27	CFA 2	3	0	—		—		—		3	0
Lille B	Total		19	2	—		—		—		19	2
Lille	2025–26	Ligue 1	1	0	1	0	1 (Note: Appearance in UEFA Europa League)	0	—		3	0
Lille	2026–27	Ligue 1	4	0	0	0	2 (Note: Appearances in UEFA Champions League)	0	—		6	0
Lille	Total		5	0	1	0	3	0	—		9	0
Career total			24	1	1	0	3	0	0	0	28	1
