= Gabriel Gudmundsson =

Swedish footballer (born 1999)

- Gudmundsson with Sweden in 2026

Personal information
- Full name: Gabriel Johan Gudmundsson
- Date of birth: 29 April 1999 (age 27)
- Place of birth: Malmö, Sweden
- Height: 1.81 m (5 ft 11 in)
- Position: Left back

Team information
- Current team: Leeds United
- Number: 3

Youth career
- Halmstads BK

Senior career*
Years	Team	Apps	(Gls)
2016–2019	Halmstads BK	80	(14)
2019–2021	Groningen	37	(2)
2021–2025	Lille	103	(4)
2025–	Leeds United	33	(0)

International career^{‡}
2014	Sweden U17	1	(0)
2016–2018	Sweden U19	8	(1)
2019	Sweden U21	2	(0)
2022–	Sweden	33	(0)
- * Club domestic league appearances and goals as of 17:46, 5 September 2026 (UTC) ‡ National team caps and goals as of 21:48, 14 November 2026 (UTC)

Gabriel Johan Gudmundsson (born 29 April 1999) is a Swedish professional footballer who plays as a left-back for Premier League club Leeds United and the Sweden national team.

== Club career ==
=== Groningen ===
On 28 May 2019, it was announced that Gudmundsson had signed for Dutch club Groningen. The length of his contract was not disclosed, and the fee was later estimated to be around SEK 2.5 million (€250,000).

=== Lille ===
On 31 August 2021, Gudmundsson signed a five-year contract with French champions Lille. The transfer fee was rumoured by Voetbal International to be around €6,000,000, though 10% of Groningen's profit went to former club Halmstads BK.

=== Leeds United ===
On 8 July 2025, after four seasons with Lille, Gudmundsson signed for Premier League club Leeds United on a four-year contract. According to various columnists and reporters, the financial details of the transfer include a base fee of €12m (£10.35m). His contract includes an annual salary around £3.88m (€4.5m) gross per season.

On 8 March 2026, Gudmundsson recorded his first goal and assist with Leeds United in a 3–0 FA Cup fifth round win against Norwich City at Elland Road.

== International career ==
After having represented the Sweden U17, U19, and U21 teams a total of 11 times between 2014 and 2019, Gudmundsson made his full international debut for Sweden on 9 June 2022 in a 2022–23 UEFA Nations League B game against Serbia, replacing Viktor Claesson in the 77th minute of a 1–0 loss.

On 12 May 2026, Gudmundsson was named in the Sweden squad for the 2026 FIFA World Cup.

== Personal life ==
Gabriel is the son of former Sweden and Blackburn Rovers player Niklas Gudmundsson.

== Style of play ==
Gudmundsson is a left-back but has also played in midfield or as a centre-back. Adam Pope from BBC Radio Leeds described him as a "good ball-carrier who takes a few risks, and is quick and athletic".

== Career statistics ==
=== Club ===
As of match played 5 September 2026

Appearances and goals by club, season and competition
Club	Season	League			National cup (Note: Includes Svenska Cupen, Coupe de France, FA Cup)		League cup (Note: Includes EFL Cup)		Europe		Other		Total	
Club	Season	Division	Apps	Goals	Apps	Goals	Apps	Goals	Apps	Goals	Apps	Goals	Apps	Goals
Halmstads BK	2016	Superettan	17	0	1	0	—		—		2	0	20	0
Halmstads BK	2017	Allsvenskan	25	4	2	1	—		—		—		27	5
Halmstads BK	2018	Superettan	28	9	3	1	—		—		—		31	10
Halmstads BK	2019	Superettan	10	1	4	1	—		—		—		14	2
Halmstads BK	Total		80	14	10	3	—		—		2	0	92	17
Groningen	2019–20	Eredivisie	11	2	0	0	—		—		—		11	2
Groningen	2020–21	Eredivisie	23	0	0	0	—		—		0	0	23	0
Groningen	2021–22	Eredivisie	3	0	—		—		—		—		3	0
Groningen	Total		37	2	0	0	—		—		—		37	2
Lille	2021–22	Ligue 1	30	1	2	0	—		4 (Note: Appearances in UEFA Champions League)	0	—		36	1
Lille	2022–23	Ligue 1	18	0	0	0	—		–		—		18	0
Lille	2023–24	Ligue 1	25	1	2	0	—		11 (Note: Appearances in UEFA Europa Conference League)	0	—		38	1
Lille	2024–25	Ligue 1	30	2	2	0	—		13	0	—		45	2
Lille	Total		103	4	6	0	—		28	0	—		137	4
Lille II	2022–23	Championnat National 3	1	0	—		—		—		—		1	0
Leeds United	2025–26	Premier League	32	0	3	1	0	0	—		—		35	1
Leeds United	2026–27	Premier League	1	0	0	0	0	0	—		—		1	0
Leeds United	Total		33	0	3	1	0	0	—		—		36	1
Career total			254	20	20	4	0	0	28	0	2	0	304	24

=== International ===
As of match played 14 November 2026

Appearances and goals by national team and year
National team	Year	Apps	Goals
Sweden	2022	2	0
Sweden	2023	4	0
Sweden	2024	6	0
Sweden	2025	9	0
Sweden	2026	12	0
Total		33	0
