= Stefano Beltrame =

Italian footballer (born 1993)

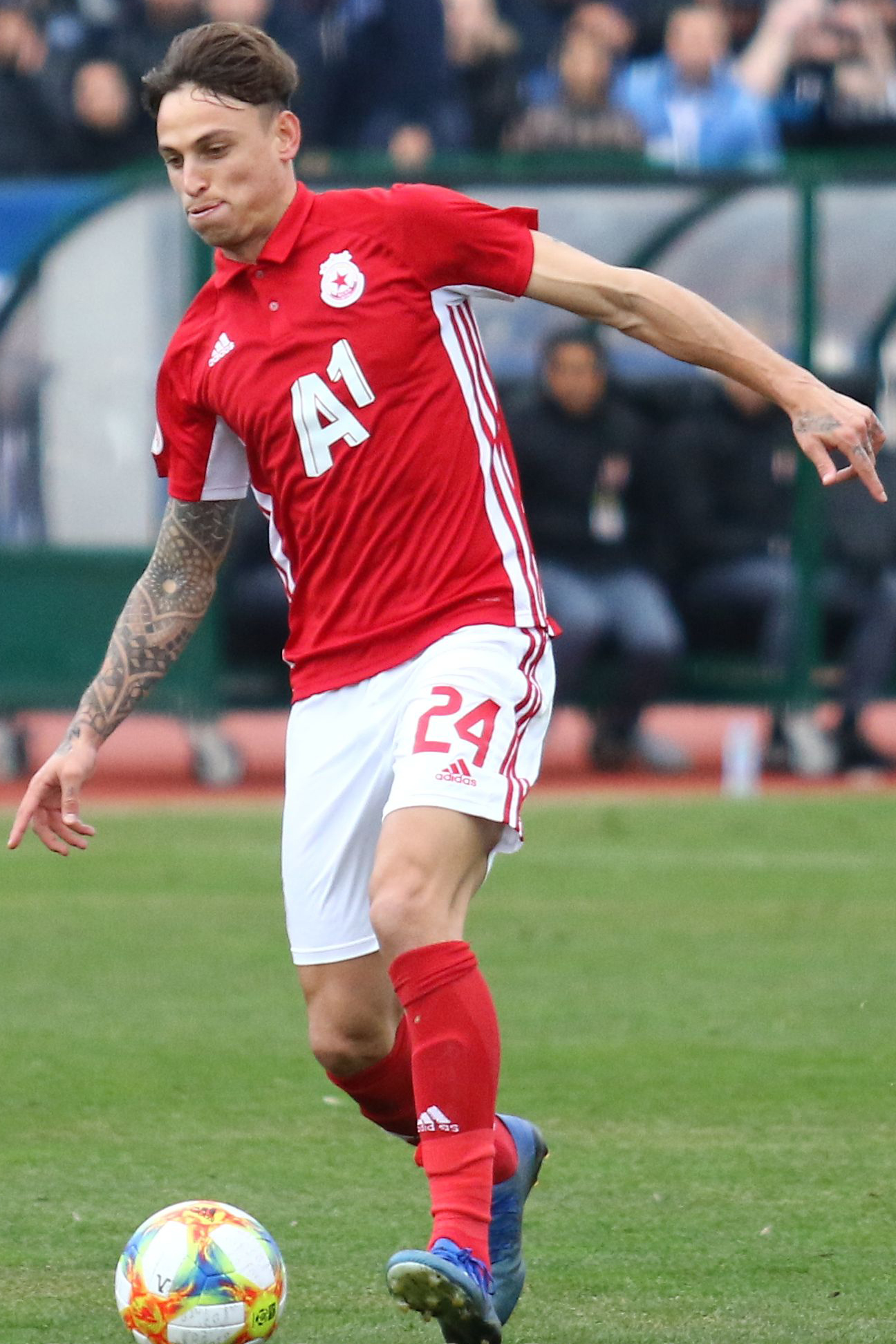
- Beltrame playing for CSKA Sofia in 2020

Personal information
- Full name: Stefano Beltrame
- Date of birth: 8 February 1993 (age 33)
- Place of birth: Biella, Italy
- Height: 1.83 m (6 ft 0 in)
- Position: Attacking midfielder

Team information
- Current team: Biellese
- Number: 10

Youth career
- Novara
- 2011–2012: Juventus

Senior career*
Years	Team	Apps	(Gls)
2012–2020	Juventus	1	(0)
2013–2014	→ Bari (loan)	23	(1)
2014–2015	→ Modena (loan)	20	(0)
2015–2016	→ Pro Vercelli (loan)	9	(0)
2016	→ Pordenone (loan)	6	(2)
2016–2017	→ Den Bosch (loan)	28	(3)
2017–2018	→ Go Ahead Eagles (loan)	32	(5)
2018–2019	→ Den Bosch (loan)	37	(14)
2019–2020	Juventus Next Gen	12	(1)
2020	CSKA Sofia	21	(3)
2021–2023	Marítimo	43	(2)
2023–2024	Persib Bandung	16	(4)
2025	Masfout Club	5	(0)
2025–	Biellese	30	(13)

International career
2011	Italy U18	2	(2)
2011–2012	Italy U19	13	(3)
2013–2014	Italy U20	5	(2)
- * Club domestic league appearances and goals as of 25 June 2026

Stefano "Teto" Beltrame (born 8 February 1993) is an Italian professional footballer who plays as an attacking midfielder for Serie D club Biellese.

== Club career ==
=== Juventus ===
Born in Biella, Piedmont region, Beltrame began his youth career with Novara Calcio. He was signed by Juventus FC in 2011 in a co-ownership deal, for €750,000, where he formed a strike partnership with Stefano Padovan in the Primavera (under-19) squad, with whom he graduated the youth academy in June 2013 after helping the club to several youth-team accolades, including the 2013 Coppa Italia Primavera and the 2012 Torneo di Viareggio. During the 2012–13 Serie A season, Beltrame also began to earn a handful of first-team call-ups by head coach, Antonio Conte. Juventus also signed Beltrame outright for an additional fee of €750,000 (half of the registration rights of Alberto Libertazzi plus €300,000).

He made his debut for Juventus on 26 January 2013 against Genoa, coming on as an 82nd-minute substitute for Claudio Marchisio, as the club was searching for a win during a 1–1 draw. Beltrame nearly scored just minutes after his introduction if not for a vital save by Sebastien Frey.

=== Bari (loan) ===
On 2 September 2013, Beltrame was signed by Bari on a one-year loan deal from Juventus. In January 2014, however, half of the registration rights of his contract was swapped with 50% registration rights of Vincenzo Fiorillo of Sampdoria. Under the joint ownership agreement between Juventus and Sampdoria, the player's contractual playing rights would be acquired by Sampdoria, and the player would remain on loan with Bari for the remainder of the 2013–14 Serie B season. The co-ownership agreement between Juventus and Sampdoria was officially renewed on 18 June 2014.

=== Modena (loan) ===
On 1 July 2014, Beltrame officially joined Sampdoria upon the conclusion of the loan deal, although it was soon agreed that he would be joining Serie B side, Modena on another season-long loan deal. However, in winter transfer window of 2015, Beltrame returned to Juventus for €1 million in a 4 1/2-year contract, with Jakub Hromada and Atila Varga moved to Sampdoria for €600,000 and €400,000 respectively.

=== Pro Vercelli (loan) ===
In summer 2015, he was signed by Pro Vercelli in a temporary deal. On 1 February 2016, he was signed by Pordenone.

=== CSKA Sofia ===
On 27 January 2020, Beltrame signed a permanent deal with Bulgarian club CSKA Sofia, earning a reported €1.5 million per year. He made his official debut on 15 February 2020 in the Eternal Derby against Levski Sofia, starting from the first minute and being substituted 10 minutes before the end. In his second match against Botev Plovdiv on 22 February, he scored his first goal for CSKA Sofia, securing a 1-0 victory and deservingly being named Man of the Match. He scored his second goal for the club against FC Tsarsko Selo Sofia in a 2–1 defeat.

On 17 December 2020, Beltrame terminated his contract with CSKA Sofia.

=== Marítimo ===
On 15 January 2021, Beltrame signed with Primeira Liga club Marítimo. At the end of the 2022–23 season, following Marítimo's relegation to the Liga Portugal 2, Beltrame's contract expired and he left the Funchal-based side.

=== Persib Bandung ===
On 28 November 2023, Beltrame joined Indonesian Liga 1 club Persib Bandung. On 4 December 2023, Beltrame made his league debut for Persib when he was substituted in at the 70th minute, replacing Beckham Putra. In the 2023–24 season, Beltrame scored four goals and helped Persib win its first title in 10 years. At the end of the 2023–24 season, Beltrame left Persib for family reasons.

=== Masfout Club ===
On 13 February 2025, Masfout Club announced via Instagram that they had signed Beltrame.

== International career ==
Beltrame has represented Italy at the U-18, U-19, and U-20 international levels. He has 7 goals in 19 youth international matches, and has been a key component in Italy's U-19 UEFA Euro qualifiers.

== Career statistics ==
=== Club ===
As of match played 31 May 2024

Appearances and goals by club, season and competition
Club	Season	League			National cup		Continental		Other		Total	
Club	Season	Division	Apps	Goals	Apps	Goals	Apps	Goals	Apps	Goals	Apps	Goals
Juventus	2012–13	Serie A	1	0	0	0	0	0	—		1	0
Bari (loan)	2013–14	Serie B	23	1	0	0	—		1 (Note: Appearance in Serie B promotion playoffs)	0	24	1
Modena (loan)	2014–15	Serie B	20	0	3	1	—		—		23	1
Pro Vercelli (loan)	2015–16	Serie B	9	0	1	0	—		—		10	0
Pordenone (loan)	2015–16	Lega Pro	6	2	0	0	—		3 (Note: Appearances in Lega Pro promotion play-offs)	0	9	2
Den Bosch (loan)	2016–17	Eerste Divisie	28	3	1	0	—		—		29	3
Go Ahead Eagles (loan)	2017–18	Eerste Divisie	32	5	1	0	—		—		33	5
Den Bosch (loan)	2018–19	Eerste Divisie	37	14	0	0	—		1 (Note: Appearance in Eerste Divisie promotion play-offs)	0	38	14
Juventus Next Gen	2019–20	Serie C	12	1	—		—		2 (Note: Appearances in Coppa Italia Serie C)	0	14	1
CSKA Sofia	2019–20	First Professional Football League	7	2	4	0	0	0	—		11	2
CSKA Sofia	2020–21	First Professional Football League	14	1	1	1	5 (Note: Appearances in UEFA Europa League)	0	—		20	2
CSKA Sofia	Total		21	3	5	1	5	0	—		31	4
Marítimo	2020–21	Primeira Liga	3	1	0	0	0	0	—		3	1
Marítimo	2021–22	Primeira Liga	20	1	1	0	—		—		21	1
Marítimo	2022–23	Primeira Liga	20	0	1	0	—		0	0	21	0
Marítimo	Total		43	2	2	0	0	0	0	0	45	2
Persib Bandung	2023–24	Liga 1	16	4	0	0	—		—		16	4
Career total			248	35	13	2	5	0	7	0	274	37

== Honours ==
Juventus

- Coppa Italia Primavera: 2013
- Serie A: 2012–13

Persib Bandung

- Liga 1: 2023–24
