= Danny Esteves =

Portuguese footballer

Personal information
- Full name: Daniel Jorge Dias Esteves
- Date of birth: 29 July 1994 (age 32)
- Place of birth: Alcobaça, Portugal
- Height: 1.76 m (5 ft 9 in)
- Position: Forward

Youth career
- –2003: Alcobaça
- 2003–2005: Sporting CP
- 2005–2006: Alcobaça
- 2006–2013: União de Leiria

Senior career*
Years	Team	Apps	(Gls)
2013	União de Leiria	1	(0)
2013–2015	Alcobaça	48	(34)
2015	Águias do Moradal	15	(1)
2016	Vitória Sernache	13	(3)
2016	Alcobaça	17	(1)
2017–2018	Alcanenense	35	(15)
2018–2019	Praiense	37	(15)
2019	Academica Clinceni	1	(0)
2019–2020	Fátima	15	(4)
2020–2021	Fontinhas	22	(3)
2021	Marinhense	5	(2)
2022–2023	Alqueidão da Serra	47	(23)
- * Club domestic league appearances and goals as of 18:37, 16 June 2024 (UTC)

Daniel Jorge Dias Esteves, commonly known as Danny Esteves, (born 29 July 1994) is a Portuguese footballer who plays as a forward.

In his career Esteves also played for teams such as Academica Clinceni, União de Leiria, G.C. Alcobaça or S.C. Praiense.
