= Xavier Mandza =

French footballer (born 2009)

Personal information
- Full name: Xavier Junior Mandza Tsiendi
- Date of birth: 6 April 2009 (age 17)
- Place of birth: Nice, France
- Height: 1.85 m (6 ft 1 in)
- Positions: Centre-back; midfielder

Team information
- Current team: Nice
- Number: 35

Youth career
- 2015–2026: Nice

Senior career*
Years	Team	Apps	(Gls)
2026–	Nice	3	(0)

International career^{‡}
2024	France U15	2	(0)
2024–2025	France U16	8	(0)
2025–	France U17	1	(0)
- * Club domestic league appearances and goals as of 11 September 2026 ‡ National team caps and goals as of 11 September 2026

Xavier Junior Mandza Tsiendi, more commonly known simply as Xavier Mandza or Junior Mandza, (born 6 April 2009) is a French professional footballer who plays as a centre-back or midfielder for Ligue 1 club Nice.

== Club career ==
Born and grown in Nice, Xavier Mandza joined the OGC Nice academy in 2015, aged only 6, spending all his youth years with the club, where he emerged as one of its brightest prospects, along the likes of Kaïl Boudache, Everton, Hamza Koutoune or Djibril Coulibaly.

During the 2025–26 season, he was a standout with the under-19 team, most notably in the Coupe Gambardella as they went past the likes of Monaco and Olympique de Marseille's academy, only losing to the eventual finalists, Megnan-Pavé's Montpellier.

Mandza signed his first professional contract with the club on the summer 2026, despite being reportedly very close join Serie A giant Juventus.

Initially playing as a box-to-box midfielder, he was repositioned as a centre-back in Olivier Pantaloni's 3–4–3 during Nice pre-season friendlies.

Mandza made his professional debut for Nice on the 22 August 2026, starting in a 0–0 home Ligue 1 draw to Lorient, where he impressed, showing calm and control for this first game.

== International career ==
Mandza is a youth international for France, first receiving a call with the under-17 in September 2025.

== Personal life ==
Xavier Mandza is the son of former Gabon international Thierry Mandza.
