= Junior Senneville =

Footballer (born 1991)

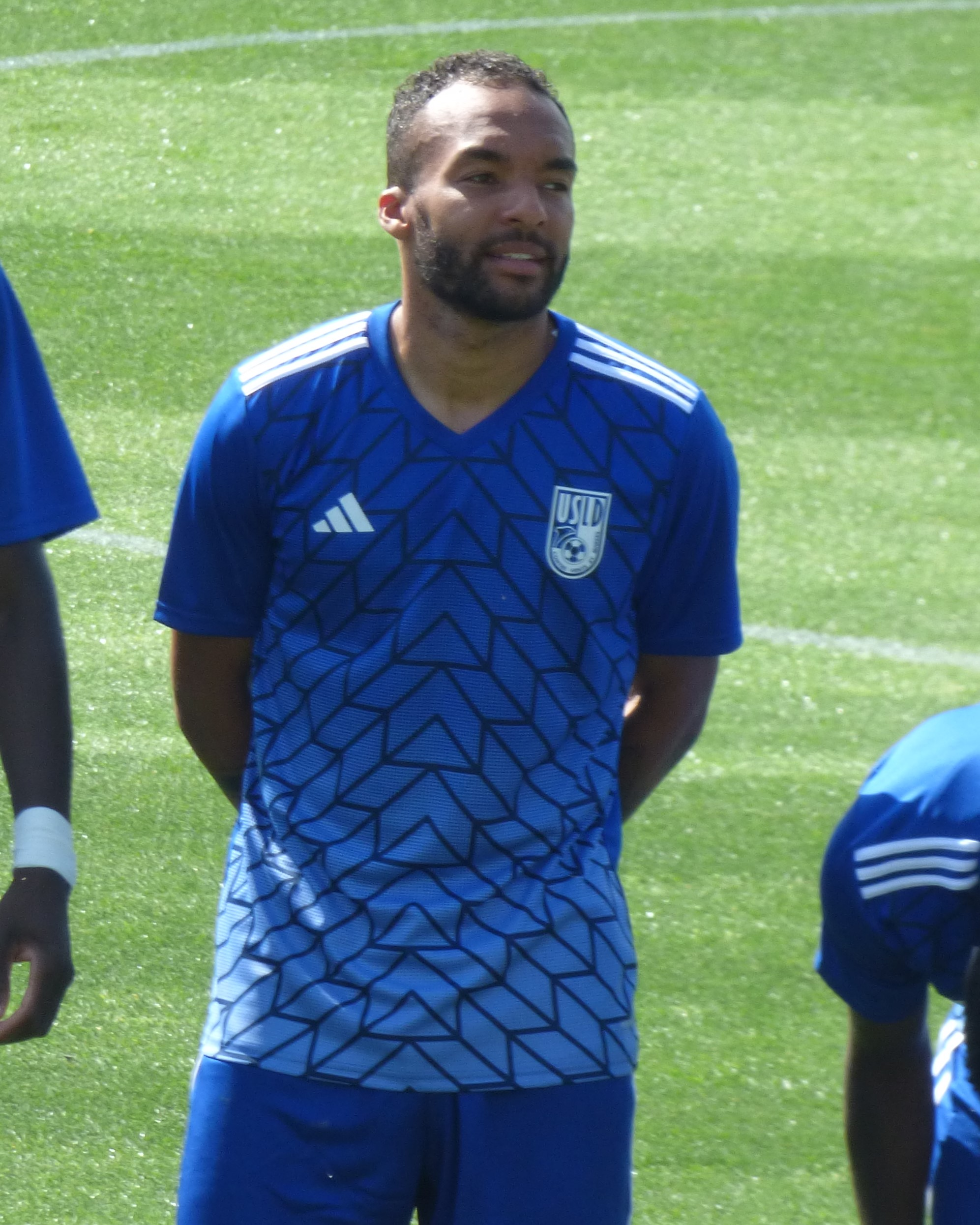
- Junior Senneville during the RC Lens / USL Dunkerque friendly match, on July 8, 2023, at the Stade François Blin in Avion.

Personal information
- Birth name: Christian Senneville
- Date of birth: 31 January 1991 (age 35)
- Place of birth: Dunkirk, France
- Height: 1.71 m (5 ft 7 in)
- Positions: Right-back; midfielder

Team information
- Current team: Calais

Youth career
- –2010: Dunkerque

Senior career*
Years	Team	Apps	(Gls)
2010–2016	Dunkerque	171	(4)
2016–2022	Boulogne	146	(5)
2017–2021	Boulogne B	7	(1)
2022–2025	Dunkerque	18	(1)
2025–	Calais		

International career^{‡}
2023–	Guadeloupe	13	(0)
- * Club domestic league appearances and goals as of 10 May 2025 ‡ National team caps and goals as of 00:13, 28 September 2025 (UTC)

Christian "Junior" Senneville (born 31 January 1991) is a professional footballer who plays as a right-back and midfielder for Régional 1 club Calais. Born in metropolitan France, he plays for the Guadeloupe national team.

== Club career ==
A native of Dunkirk, Senneville grew up playing in the youth of academy of local club Dunkerque. He played for the club until 2016, when he signed for fellow Championnat National club Boulogne. In 2022, after six seasons with Boulogne, Senneville returned to Dunkerque, signing his first professional contract with the club. In his first season back, Dunkerque achieved promotion by finishing second in the Championnat National. On 13 January 2024, Senneville played in his first Ligue 2 match, and scored a 77th-minute long-range goal to reduce Dunkerque's deficit in a 2–2 comeback draw away to Grenoble.

== International career ==
Senneville made his debut for Guadeloupe on 12 October 2023 in a 2–1 defeat to Saint Lucia in the CONCACAF Nations League League B. Guadeloupe achieved promotion to League A at the end of the competition.

== Personal life ==
Born in metropolitan France, Senneville is of Guadeloupean descent through his father Christian. His father, Christian Senneville, who was a longtime volunteer and reserve-ream announcer for USL Dunkerque, died in December 2019.
