= Stanley Kanu =

Nigerian association football player

Personal information
- Full name: Stanley Guzorochi Kanu
- Date of birth: 17 January 1999 (age 27)
- Place of birth: Umuahia, Nigeria
- Height: 1.81 m (5 ft 11 in)
- Position: Winger

Team information
- Current team: Zlín
- Number: 14

Youth career
- 2016–2017: Diamond Academy
- 2017–2018: Portosantense

Senior career*
Years	Team	Apps	(Gls)
2018–2019	Caçadores das Taipas	21	(1)
2019–2020	GD Vilar de Perdizes	21	(8)
2020–2025	Marítimo B	99	(32)
2022–2025	Marítimo	6	(0)
2025–	Zlín	42	(7)
- * Club domestic league appearances and goals as of 27 May 2026

Stanley Guzorochi Kanu (born 17 January 1999) is a Nigerian footballer who plays as a winger for Czech club Zlín.

== Professional career ==
Kanu is a youth product of Diamond Academy in Nigeria, before finishing his development in Portugal with Portosantense. He began his senior career with Caçadores das Taipas in 2018, and followed that up with a stint with the amateur club GD Vilar de Perdizes. On 31 August 2020, he moved to the Marítimo B team. He made his professional debut with the senior Marítimo side as a late substitute in a 1–1 Primeira Liga tie with Rio Ave on 23 December 2022.
