= Djibril Ouziad =

French footballer (born 2009)

Personal information
- Date of birth: 27 April 2009 (age 17)
- Place of birth: Le Havre, France
- Positions: Defender; midfielder

Team information
- Current team: Le Havre AC
- Number: 20

Youth career
- –2019: Racing Club Havrais
- 2019–: Le Havre AC

Senior career*
Years	Team	Apps	(Gls)
2026–	Le Havre AC	10	(0)

International career^{‡}
2026–	France U18	2	(0)
- * Club domestic league appearances and goals as of 20 November 2026 ‡ National team caps and goals as of 27 September 2026

Djibril Ouziad (born 27 April 2009) is a French professional footballer who plays as a defender or midfielder for Ligue 1 club Le Havre AC.

== Club career ==
As a youth player, Ouziad joined the youth academy of Racing Club Havrais. Following his stint there, he joined the youth academy of Le Havre AC and was promoted to the club's senior team ahead of the 2026–27 season.

On 29 August 2026, he debuted for them during a 1–1 away draw with Olympique Lyonnais in the league. The same year, he signed his first professional contract with Les Ciel et Marine until 2030.

== International career ==
Ouziad is a French youth international and has represented the country internationally at under-18 level and has expressed interest in representing Algeria internationally.

During September 2026, he played for the France national under-18 football team at the 2026 Lafarge Foot Avenir.
