= Matheus Costa (footballer) =

Brazilian footballer (born 1995)

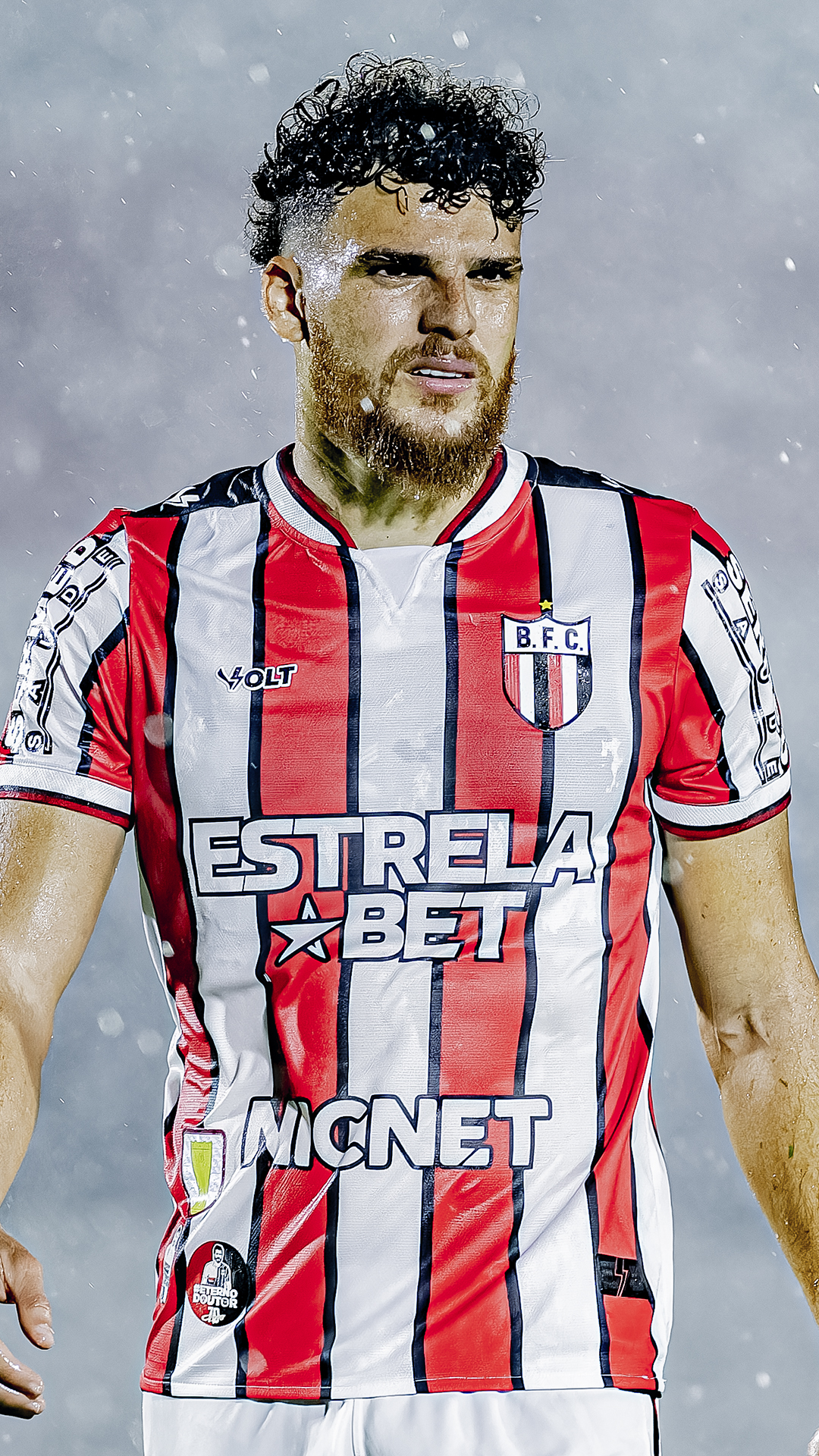
- Matheus Costa with Botafogo-SP in 2024

Personal information
- Full name: Matheus de Mello Costa
- Date of birth: 26 January 1995 (age 31)
- Place of birth: Belo Horizonte, Brazil
- Height: 1.88 m (6 ft 2 in)
- Position: Centre-back

Team information
- Current team: Leixões
- Number: 14

Youth career
- 2014–2015: Democrata-GV

Senior career*
Years	Team	Apps	(Gls)
2016	Democrata-GV	0	(0)
2016–2017	Real Massamá	23	(5)
2017–2019	Leixões	28	(3)
2019–2021	Vizela	47	(2)
2021–2024	Marítimo	59	(7)
2024–2025	Botafogo-SP	24	(0)
2025–2026	Petro de Luanda	2	(0)
2026–	Leixões	13	(0)
- * Club domestic league appearances and goals as of 19 June 2026

Matheus de Mello Costa (born 26 January 1995), known as Matheus Costa, is a Brazilian professional footballer who plays as a centre-back for Liga Portugal 2 club Leixões. He also holds Portuguese nationality.

== Career ==
=== Real Massamá ===
Matheus Costa made his league debut against F.C. Barreirense on 30 October 2016. He scored his first goals for the club against Sacavenense on 10 December 2016, scoring in the 42nd and 52nd minute.

=== Leixões ===
Matheus Costa made his league debut against Braga B on 28 August 2017. He scored his first goal for the club against Arouca on 10 December 2017, scoring in the 90th minute.

=== Vizela ===
Matheus Costa made his league debut against Marítimo B on 18 August 2019. He scored his first goals for the club against Penafiel on 16 January 2021, scoring in the 35th and 84th minute.

=== Marítimo ===
Matheus Costa joined Marítimo on 28 May 2021. He made his debut against FC Porto on 22 August 2021. Matheus Costa scored his first league goal against C.D. Tondela on 7 November 2021, scoring in the 75th minute.

=== Botafogo-SP ===
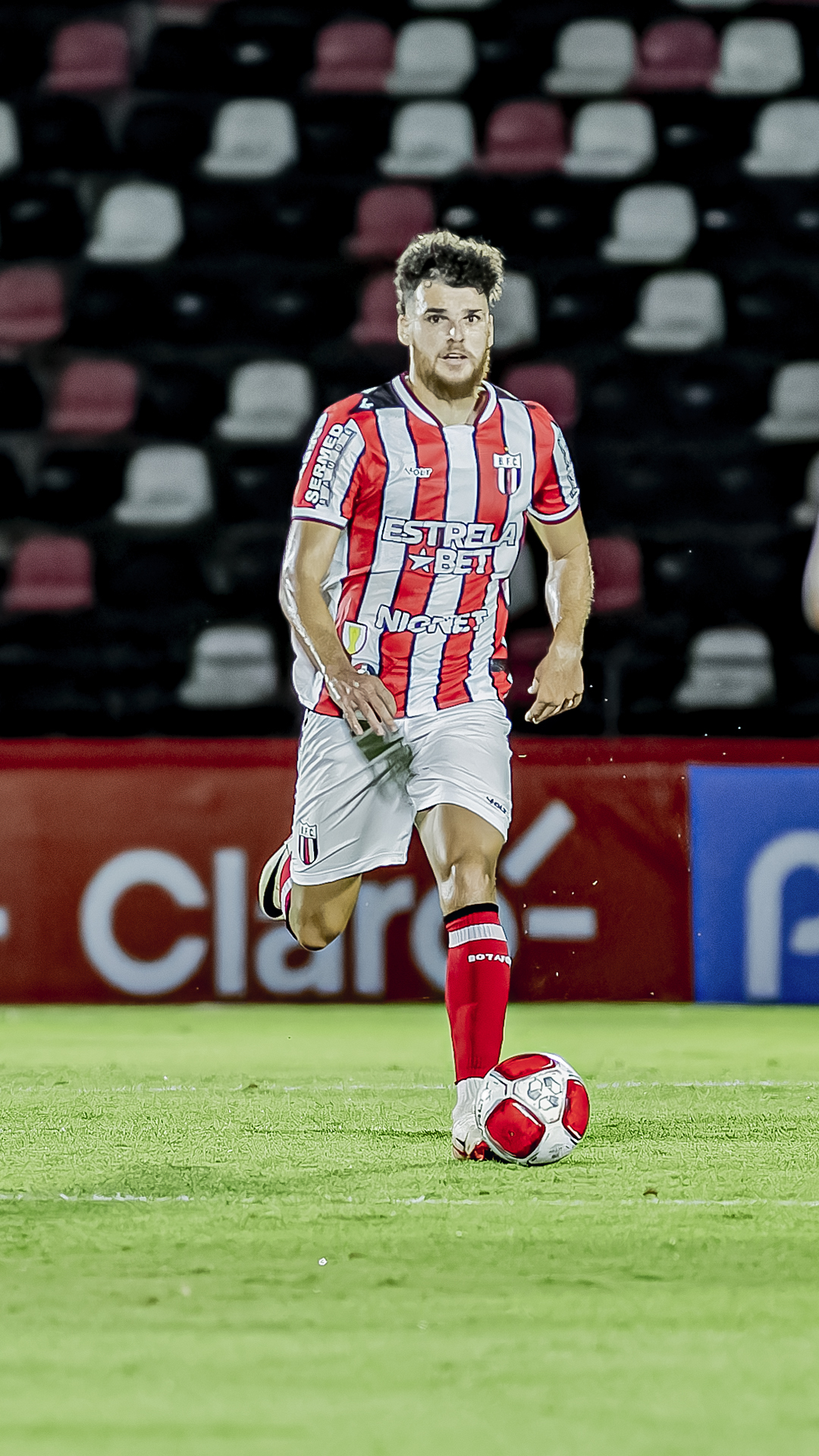
Matheus Costa playing for Botafogo-SP in 2024

Matheus Costa made his league debut against Mirassol on 17 February 2024. He scored his first goal for the club in the Copa do Brasil on 15 March 2024, scoring against Anápolis in the 45th+3rd minute.

=== Petro de Luanda ===
In August 2025, Costa moved to Angola, joining Girabola club Petro de Luanda on a contract until the end of the season.

=== Return to Leixões ===
On 31 January 2026, after having made just four appearances for Petro de Luanda, Costa returned to Portugal, joining his former club Leixões, who sat bottom of the Liga Portugal 2 table.
