= Ousmane Touré (footballer) =

French footballer (born 2005)

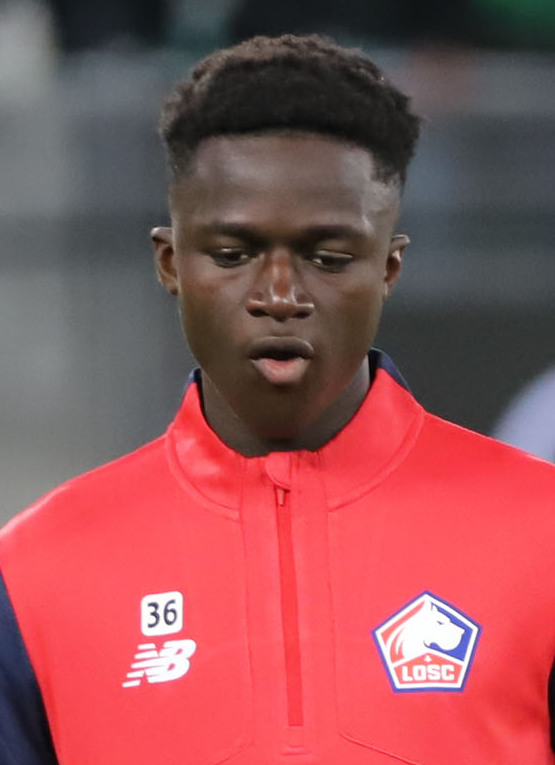
- Touré warming up with Lille in 2024

Personal information
- Date of birth: 18 February 2005 (age 21)
- Place of birth: Lille, France
- Height: 1.87 m (6 ft 2 in)
- Position: Centre-back

Team information
- Current team: Dunkerque (on loan from Lille)
- Number: 2

Youth career
- 2011–2012: ES Ennequin
- 2012–2013: Olympic Hallennois
- 2013–2014: ES Ennequin
- 2014–2022: Lille

Senior career*
Years	Team	Apps	(Gls)
2022–	Lille II	32	(1)
2024–	Lille	2	(0)
2025	→ Valenciennes (loan)	16	(1)
2026–	→ Dunkerque (loan)	0	(0)
- * Club domestic league appearances and goals as of 4 September 2026

Ousmane Touré (born 18 February 2005) is a French professional footballer who plays as a centre-back for Ligue 2 club Dunkerque on loan from Lille.

== Club career ==
A Lille academy graduate, Touré started playing football for ES Ennequin and Olympic Hallennois, both amateur clubs located in Lille area. On 26 July 2022, he signed his first professional contract with Lille until 2025, and joined their reserve side. On 17 July 2024, he extended his contract with Lille until 2028. He made his senior and professional debut with Lille as a substitute in a 1–1 UEFA Champions League tie with Fenerbahçe on 13 August 2024.

On 6 January 2025, Touré joined Championnat National club Valenciennes FC on loan until 30 June 2025.

== Personal life ==
Born in France, Touré is of Malian descent.

== Career statistics ==
As of match played 17 August 2025

Appearances and goals by club, season and competition
Club	Season	League			Cup		Europe		Other		Total	
Club	Season	Division	Apps	Goals	Apps	Goals	Apps	Goals	Apps	Goals	Apps	Goals
Lille II	2021–22	Championnat National 3	1	0	—		—		—		1	0
Lille II	2022–23	Championnat National 3	4	0	—		—		—		4	0
Lille II	2023–24	Championnat National 3	22	1	—		—		—		22	1
Lille II	Total		27	1	—		—		—		27	1
Lille	2024–25	Ligue 1	1	0	0	0	2 (Note: Appearances in UEFA Champions League)	0	—		3	0
Lille	2025–26	Ligue 1	1	0	0	0	0	0	—		1	0
Lille	Total		2	0	0	0	2	0	—		4	0
Valenciennes (loan)	2024–25	Ligue 2	16	1	1	0	—		—		17	1
Career total			45	2	1	0	2	0	0	0	48	2
