= Kiki Silva =

Portuguese footballer (born 1998)

Personal information
- Full name: Francisco Pedro Tiago Silva
- Date of birth: 14 February 1998 (age 28)
- Place of birth: Sintra, Portugal
- Height: 1.72 m (5 ft 8 in)
- Position: Winger

Team information
- Current team: Trofense
- Number: 11

Youth career
- 2006–2007: Lourel
- 2007–2013: 1º Dezembro
- 2013–2015: Estoril
- 2015–2019: Braga

Senior career*
Years	Team	Apps	(Gls)
2017–2020	Braga B	34	(5)
2020–2023	Leixões	72	(10)
2023–2026	Casa Pia	3	(0)
2026–	Trofense	4	(0)
- * Club domestic league appearances and goals as of 5 September 2026

Francisco Pedro "Kiki" Tiago Silva (born 14 February 1998) is a Portuguese professional footballer who plays as a winger for Liga 3 club Trofense.

== Club career ==
On 12 August 2017, Silva made his professional debut with Braga B in a 2017–18 LigaPro match against Académica.
