= Anthony Civet =

French footballer (born 1997)

Personal information
- Date of birth: 1 April 1997 (age 29)
- Place of birth: Clermont-Ferrand, France
- Height: 1.90 m (6 ft 3 in)
- Position: Midfielder

Team information
- Current team: Fréjus Saint-Raphaël

Youth career
- 2004–2017: Clermont

Senior career*
Years	Team	Apps	(Gls)
2016–2018	Clermont B	35	(1)
2017–2018	Clermont	1	(0)
2018–2019	Marignane Gignac	5	(0)
2019–2022	Moulins Yzeure	43	(2)
2022	Chambly	6	(0)
2022–2023	Lusitanos Saint-Maur	16	(0)
2023–2024	Le Puy	26	(0)
2024–2025	La Roche VF	12	(0)
2025–	Fréjus Saint-Raphaël	0	(0)
- * Club domestic league appearances and goals as of 09:50, 4 January 2025 (UTC)

Anthony Civet (born 1 April 1997) is a French professional footballer who plays as a midfielder for Championnat National 1 club Fréjus Saint-Raphaël.

== Career ==
Civet made his professional debut with Clermont in a 3–0 Ligue 2 win over Le Havre on 14 October 2017.

On 1 February 2022, Civet moved to Chambly on a 1.5-year contract.

On 2 January 2025, Civet signed for Fréjus Saint-Raphaël.
