= Ayyoub Bouaddi =

Moroccan footballer (born 2007)

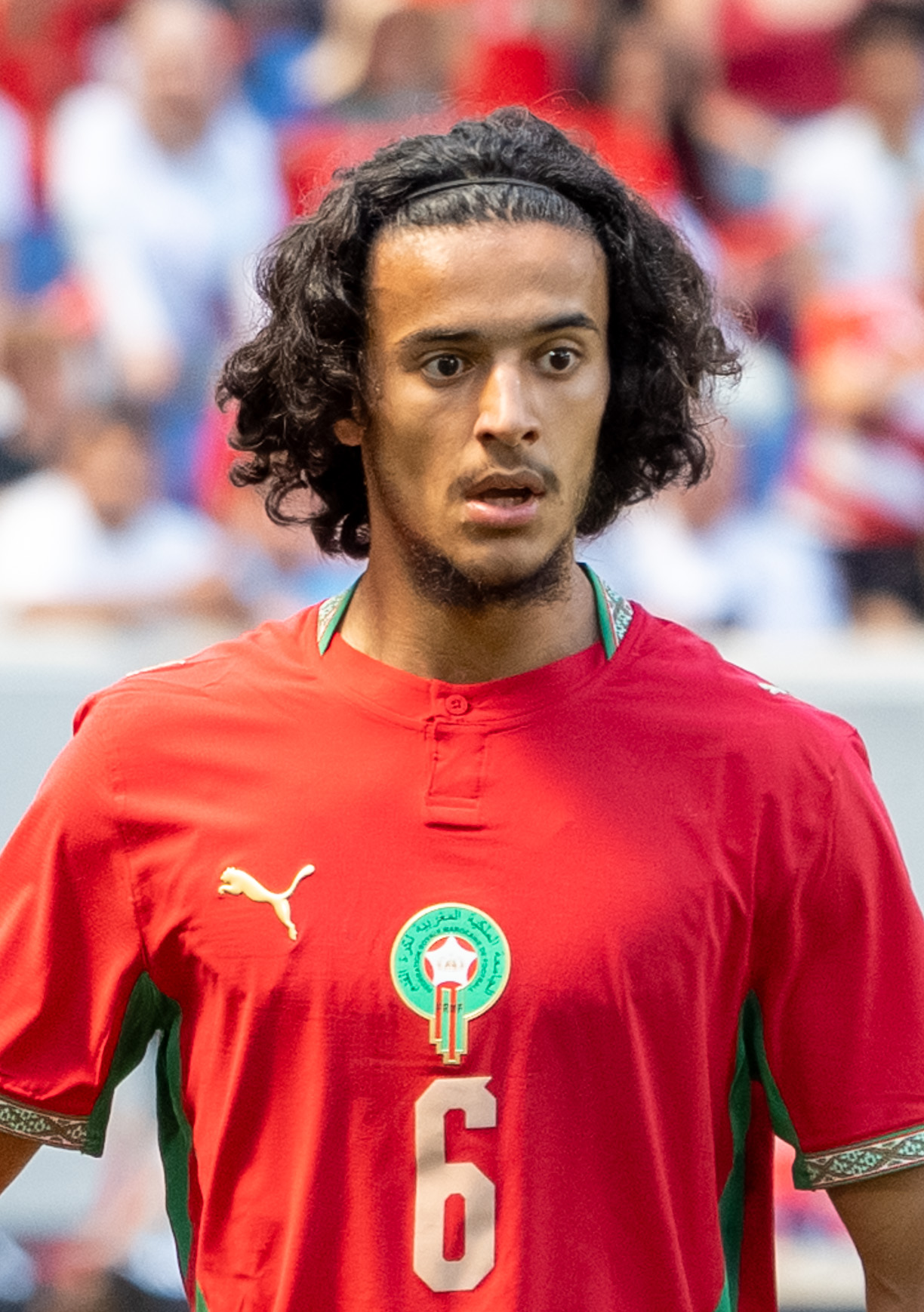
- Bouaddi with Morocco in 2026

Personal information
- Date of birth: 2 October 2007 (age 19)
- Place of birth: Senlis, France
- Height: 1.85 m (6 ft 1 in)
- Position: Midfielder

Team information
- Current team: Manchester City
- Number: 32

Youth career
- 2012–2021: AFC Creil
- 2021–2023: Lille

Senior career*
Years	Team	Apps	(Gls)
2023	Lille B	3	(0)
2023–2026	Lille	63	(0)
2026–	Manchester City	5	(0)

International career^{‡}
2022–2023	France U16	8	(3)
2023–2024	France U17	5	(0)
2024	France U18	3	(0)
2024	France U20	1	(0)
2024–2026	France U21	10	(1)
2026–	Morocco	12	(0)
- * Club domestic league appearances and goals as of 31 October 2026 ‡ National team caps and goals as of 17 November 2026

Ayyoub Bouaddi (Note: Arabic: أيوب بوعدي, Berber languages: ⴰⵢⵢⵓⴱ ⴱⵓⵄⴰⴷⴷⵉ) (born 2 October 2007) is a professional footballer who plays as a midfielder for Premier League club Manchester City. Born in France, he plays for the Morocco national team.

== Early life and education ==
Bouaddi was born in Senlis, France, to a Moroccan family of Shilha Berber origin with roots in the city of Tiznit. In June 2023, at the Elysée Palace, he won the fourth eloquence competition for French football academies. He gained a high school diploma in mathematics and physics through distance learning.

== Club career ==
=== Lille ===
After starting football as a child in Creil, Bouaddi joined Lille academy in 2021. On 21 August 2023, he signed his first professional contract with the club until June 2026.

On 5 October 2023, Bouaddi made his senior debut for Lille in a UEFA Europa Conference League group stage match against Faroese club KÍ which ended as a goalless draw. At the age of 16 years and 3 days, this made him the youngest player ever to play in a European club competition game. He also became the youngest player to appear in an official match for Lille, a record which was previously held by Joël Henry since 1978. On 22 October, at 16 years and 20 days, he became the youngest player in Ligue 1 since Joël Fréchet in 1981.

A year later, on 2 October 2024, Bouaddi became one of the youngest Lille players to start in a UEFA Champions League match, playing on his 17th birthday in a 1–0 home win against Real Madrid in the 2024–25 league phase. He started alongside captain Benjamin André after a combination of injuries, suspension and eligibility issues left Lille short of midfielders. Being one of the best players on the pitch, his performance was praised by various media. After the final whistle, Lille ultras sang Joyeux Anniversaire (French for "Happy Birthday to You") with the players for Bouaddi when celebrating the win.

On 5 December 2025, Bouaddi signed a contract extension with Lille until June 2029. In January 2026, he became the youngest player to make 50 Ligue 1 appearances for Lille, breaking the record previously held by Eden Hazard.

=== Manchester City ===
On 26 August 2026, Premier League club Manchester City signed Bouaddi for a reported £85.6m on a five-year contract. He made his debut on 28 August 2026, in a league match against Crystal Palace.

== International career ==
=== France ===
Bouaddi has been part of France's youth setup at various levels, including the under-21 side, which he captained.

=== Morocco ===
On 15 May 2026, the Royal Moroccan Football Federation announced that FIFA had approved their request to switch Bouaddi's international allegiance to Morocco. On 26 May, he was named in Morocco's 26-man squad for the 2026 FIFA World Cup. He made his FIFA World Cup debut in the opening match against Brazil, which ended in a 1–1 draw. In the quarter-finals against France, he became the first African teenager to make five World Cup appearances, achieving the milestone at the age of 18 years and 280 days.

== Style of play ==
Bouaddi is a versatile midfielder known for his composure under pressure, accurate passing, and confidence in carrying the ball. Primarily a holding midfielder, he is capable of dictating play from deep and can also play at right-back.

== Career statistics ==
=== Club ===
As of match played 4 November 2026

Appearances and goals by club, season and competition
Club	Season	League			National cup (Note: Includes Coupe de France, FA Cup)		League cup (Note: Includes EFL Cup)		Europe		Total	
Club	Season	Division	Apps	Goals	Apps	Goals	Apps	Goals	Apps	Goals	Apps	Goals
Lille B	2023–24	Championnat National 3	3	0	—		—		—		3	0
Lille	2023–24	Ligue 1	9	0	3	0	—		6 (Note: Appearances in UEFA Europa Conference League)	0	18	0
Lille	2024–25	Ligue 1	24	0	3	0	—		9 (Note: Appearances in UEFA Champions League)	0	36	0
Lille	2025–26	Ligue 1	30	0	2	0	—		10 (Note: Appearances in UEFA Europa League)	0	42	0
Lille	Total		63	0	8	0	0	0	25	0	96	0
Manchester City	2026–27	Premier League	5	0	0	0	2	0	3	0	10	0
Career total			71	0	8	0	2	0	28	0	109	0

=== International ===
As of match played 17 November 2026

Appearances and goals by national team and year
National team	Year	Apps	Goals
Morocco	2026	12	0
Total		12	0
