= Christophe Lestrade =

French footballer (born 1969)

Personal information
- Full name: Christophe Lestrade
- Date of birth: October 27, 1969 (age 57)
- Place of birth: Bordeaux, France
- Height: 1.83 m (6 ft 0 in)
- Position: Midfielder

Senior career*
Years	Team	Apps	(Gls)
1985–1987	Bordeaux	0	(0)
1987–1989	Toulouse	0	(0)
1989–1990	Guingamp	20	(2)
1990–1991	Paris Saint-Germain	0	(0)
1991–1994	Châteauroux	84	(22)
1994–1996	Chamois Niortais	34	(1)
1996–1998	Fréjus	42	(7)
1998–1999	Stade Lamballais	?	(?)
- * Club domestic league appearances and goals

Christophe Lestrade (born October 27, 1969) is a former professional footballer who played as a defensive midfielder.
