= Cantyn Chastang =

French professional footballer (born 1998)

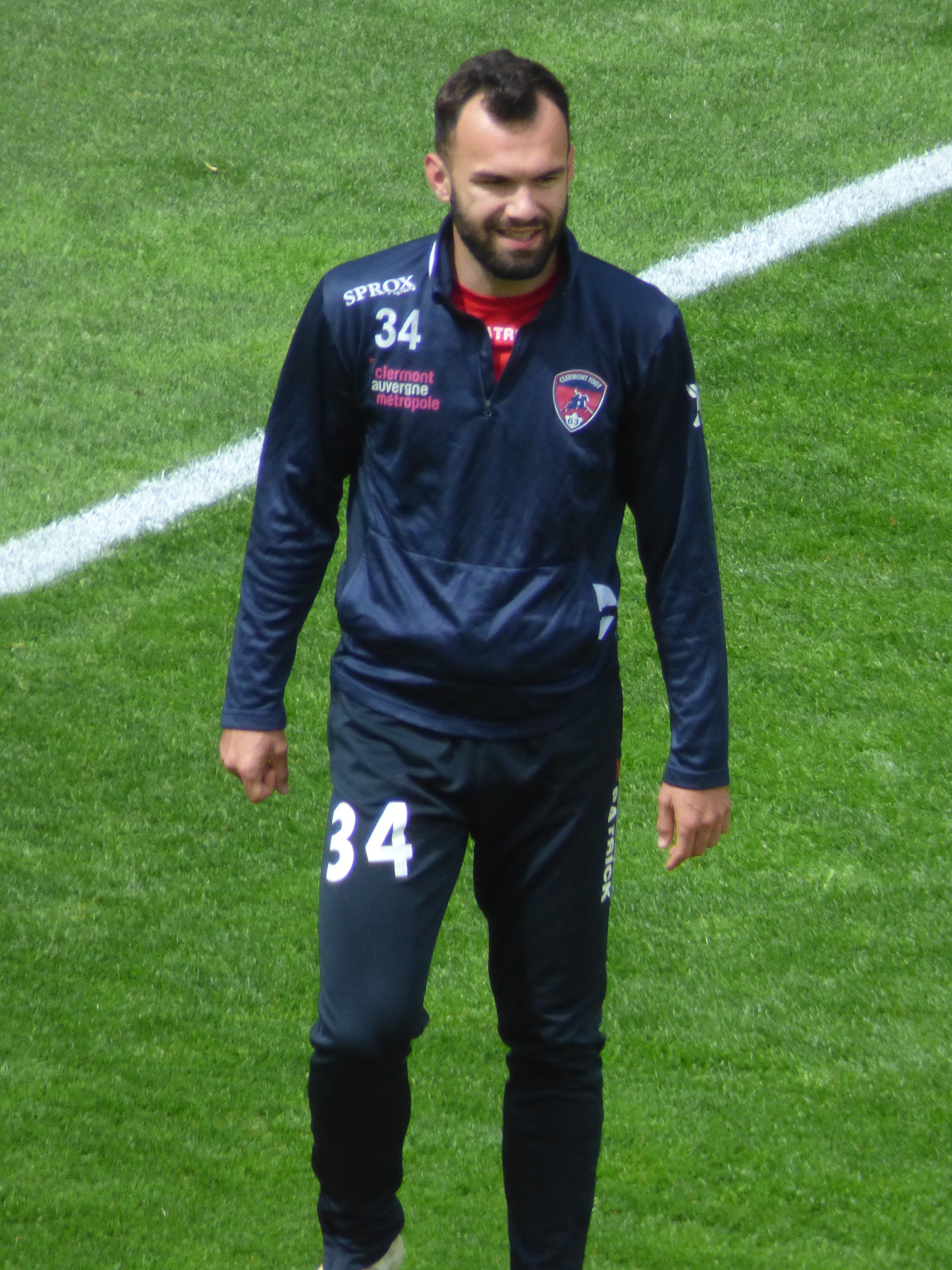
- Chastang in 2019

Personal information
- Date of birth: 30 March 1998 (age 28)
- Place of birth: Beaumont, France
- Height: 1.82 m (6 ft 0 in)
- Position: Midfielder

Team information
- Current team: Fréjus Saint-Raphaël
- Number: 4

Youth career
- –2018: Clermont

Senior career*
Years	Team	Apps	(Gls)
2015–2019	Clermont II	46	(4)
2018–2019	Clermont	2	(0)
2019–2020	Bergerac	15	(0)
2020–2023	Moulins Yzeure	58	(1)
2023–2024	Cannes	23	(0)
2024–	Fréjus Saint-Raphaël	11	(0)
- * Club domestic league appearances and goals as of 23 November 2024

Cantyn Chastang (born 30 March 1998) is a French professional footballer who plays as a midfielder for Championnat National 1 club Fréjus Saint-Raphaël.
