= 2025–26 Lille OSC season =

Lille OSC
2025–26 season
- Owner: Merlyn Partners SCSp
- President: Olivier Létang
- Head coach: Bruno Génésio
- Stadium: Stade Pierre-Mauroy
- Ligue 1: 3rd
- Coupe de France: Round of 32
- UEFA Europa League: Round of 16
- Top goalscorer: League: Matias Fernandez-Pardo; Hákon Haraldsson (8 each); All: Olivier Giroud (11)
- Average home league attendance: 43,029
Home colours	Away colours	Third colours

The 2025–26 season was the 82nd season in the history of Lille Olympique Sporting Club, and the club's 26th consecutive season in Ligue 1. In addition to the domestic league, the club participated in the Coupe de France and the UEFA Europa League.

== Players ==
=== First-team squad ===
As of 20 February 2026

Note: Flags indicate national team as defined under FIFA eligibility rules; some limited exceptions apply. Players may hold more than one non-FIFA nationality.

No.	Pos.	Nation	Player
1	GK	TUR	Berke Özer
2	DF	ALG	Aïssa Mandi
3	DF	BEL	Nathan Ngoy
4	DF	BRA	Alexsandro
6	MF	ALG	Nabil Bentaleb
7	FW	BEL	Matias Fernandez-Pardo
8	FW	FRA	Ethan Mbappé
9	FW	FRA	Olivier Giroud
10	MF	ISL	Hákon Haraldsson
11	FW	MAR	Osame Sahraoui
12	DF	BEL	Thomas Meunier
14	FW	NOR	Marius Broholm
15	DF	FRA	Romain Perraud

No.	Pos.	Nation	Player
16	GK	BEL	Arnaud Bodart
17	MF	COD	Ngal'ayel Mukau
18	DF	COD	Chancel Mbemba
20	FW	FRA	Noah Edjouma
21	MF	FRA	Benjamin André (captain)
22	DF	POR	Tiago Santos
24	DF	IDN	Calvin Verdonk
27	FW	POR	Félix Correia
28	FW	FRA	Gaëtan Perrin
29	FW	MAR	Hamza Igamane
30	GK	FRA	Marc-Aurèle Caillard
32	MF	MAR	Ayyoub Bouaddi
36	DF	FRA	Ousmane Touré

=== Out on loan ===
Note: Flags indicate national team as defined under FIFA eligibility rules; some limited exceptions apply. Players may hold more than one non-FIFA nationality.

No.	Pos.	Nation	Player
—	GK	FRA	Lisandru Olmeta (at Bastia until 30 June 2026)
—	DF	BEL	Vincent Burlet (at Boulogne until 30 June 2026)
—	DF	FRA	Isaac Cossier (at Le Mans until 30 June 2026)
—	MF	ARG	Ignacio Miramón (at Gimnasia LP until 31 December 2026)

No.	Pos.	Nation	Player
—	MF	FRA	Ugo Raghouber (at Levante until 30 June 2026)
—	FW	GUI	Mohamed Bayo (at Gaziantep until 30 June 2026)
—	FW	FRA	Ichem Ferrah (at Cambuur until 30 June 2026)
—	FW	POR	Tiago Morais (at Casa Pia until 30 June 2026)

== Transfers ==
=== In ===
No.	Pos.	Player	Transferred from	Fee	Date	Source(s)
14	FW	(Norway) Marius Broholm	(Norway) Rosenborg	€5,000,000 (Note: Initial €5,000,000 plus reported €2,000,000 bonuses and undisclosed sell-on clause)	18 June 2025	
1	GK	(Belgium) Arnaud Bodart	(France) Metz	Free	1 July 2025	
9	FW	(France) Olivier Giroud	(United States) Los Angeles FC	Free	1 July 2025	
27	FW	(Portugal) Félix Correia	(Portugal) Gil Vicente	€6,000,000 (Note: Initial €6,000,000 plus reported €1,000,000 bonuses)	17 July 2025	
3	DF	(Belgium) Nathan Ngoy	(Belgium) Standard Liège	€3,500,000 (Note: Initial €3,500,000 plus reported €1,000,000 bonuses)	24 July 2025	
15	DF	(France) Romain Perraud	(Spain) Real Betis	€3,000,000	8 August 2025	
24	DF	(Indonesia) Calvin Verdonk	(Netherlands) NEC Nijmegen	€3,000,000	1 September 2025	

==== Loan returns ====
Pos.	Player	Returned from	Date
FW	(Guinea) Mohamed Bayo	(Belgium) Antwerp	1 July 2025
DF	(Belgium) Vincent Burlet	(France) Le Mans	1 July 2025
FW	(France) Trévis Dago	(France) Annecy	1 July 2025
DF	(Portugal) Rafael Fernandes	(Scotland) Rangers	1 July 2025
FW	(Serbia) Andrej Ilić	(Germany) Union Berlin	1 July 2025
FW	(Portugal) Tiago Morais	(Portugal) Rio Ave	1 July 2025
MF	(France) Ugo Raghouber	(France) Dunkerque	1 July 2025
DF	(France) Ousmane Touré	(France) Valenciennes	1 July 2025
FW	(France) Alan Virginius	(Switzerland) Young Boys	1 July 2025

=== Out ===
Pos.	Player	Transferred to	Fee	Date	Source
FW	(Serbia) Andrej Ilić	(Germany) Union Berlin	€7,500,000 (Note: Activated option-to-buy)	1 July 2025	
MF	(France) Rémy Cabella	(Greece) Olympiacos	Free (end of contract)	1 July 2025	
MF	(England) Angel Gomes	(France) Marseille	Free (end of contract)	1 July 2025	
DF	(Brazil) Ismaily	Unattached	End of contract	1 July 2025	
GK	(Italy) Vito Mannone	Unattached	End of contract	1 July 2025	
DF	(France) Samuel Umtiti	Unattached	End of contract	1 July 2025	
FW	(England) Chuba Akpom	(Netherlands) Ajax	End of loan	1 July 2025	
DF	(Netherlands) Mitchel Bakker	(Italy) Atalanta	End of loan	1 July 2025	
FW	(Canada) Jonathan David	(Italy) Juventus	Free (end of contract)	4 July 2025	
DF	(Sweden) Gabriel Gudmundsson	(England) Leeds United	€12,000,000	8 July 2025	
FW	(France) Alan Virginius	(Switzerland) Young Boys	€2,500,000 (Note: Initial €2,500,000 plus 20% sell-on clause)	9 July 2025	
GK	(France) Lucas Chevalier	(France) Paris Saint-Germain	€40,000,000 (Note: Initial €40,000,000 plus up to €15,000,000 in bonuses)	9 August 2025	
DF	(France) Bafodé Diakité	(England) Bournemouth	€35,000,000 (Note: Initial €35,000,000 plus up to €5,000,000 in bonuses)	13 August 2025	

== Pre-season and friendlies ==
Win Draw Loss

8 July 2025 Friendly	Lille	2–0	Gent U23	Camphin-en-Pévèle
11:00 CEST (UTC+2)	Haraldsson 33'; Diaoune 44' (pen.)	Report		Stadium: Domaine de Luchin; Attendance: 0

12 July 2025 Friendly	Lille	5–0	Amiens	Camphin-en-Pévèle
17:00 CEST (UTC+2)	Diakité 14'; Haraldsson 16', 26'; Bentaleb 25', 55'	Report		Stadium: Domaine de Luchin

18 July 2025 Friendly	Como	3–2	Lille	Como, Italy
19:30 CEST (UTC+2)	Strefezza 30'; Azón 52', 77'	Report	Fernandez-Pardo 66'; Lachaab 72'	Stadium: Stadio Giuseppe Sinigaglia

2 August 2025 Friendly	Borussia Dortmund	3–2	Lille	Iserlohn, Germany
17:00 CEST (UTC+2)	Groß 13'; Guirassy 41' (pen.); Adeyemi 68'	Report	Diakité (yellow card) 40'; Haraldsson 66'; Cossier (yellow card) 74'; Meunier 81'; Bodart (yellow card) 90+2'	Stadium: Hemberg Stadium; Attendance: 4,500; Referee: Yannick Rupert (Germany)

6 August 2025 Friendly	Lille	3–0	Venezia	Camphin-en-Pévèle
17:00 CEST (UTC+2)	Giroud 19', 37'; Alexsandro (yellow card) 60'; Fernandez-Pardo 75'	Report		Stadium: Domaine de Luchin

9 August 2025 BOYLE Sports Cup	West Ham United	1–1 (5–4 p)	Lille	London, England
15:00 BST (UTC+1)	Füllkrug 87'	Report	Giroud 45+1'	Stadium: London Stadium; Attendance: 23,104; Referee: Darren England (England)
	Penalties
	Füllkrug (penalty missed); Bowen (penalty scored); Ward-Prowse (penalty scored); Souček (penalty scored); Aguerd (penalty scored); Kilman (penalty scored)		(penalty scored) Haraldsson; (penalty scored) Mukau; (penalty scored) Alexsandro; (penalty scored) Diaoune; (penalty missed) Ngoy; (penalty missed) Baret

== Competitions ==
=== Overall record ===
Competition	First match	Last match	Starting round	Final position	Record							
Competition	First match	Last match	Starting round	Final position	Pld	W	D	L	GF	GA	GD	Win %
Ligue 1	17 August 2025	17 May 2026	Matchday 1	3rd	34	18	7	9	52	37	+15	52.94
Coupe de France	20 December 2025	11 January 2026	Round of 64	Round of 32	2	1	0	1	2	2	+0	50.00
UEFA Europa League	25 September 2025	19 March 2026	League phase	Round of 16	12	5	0	7	14	13	+1	41.67
Total					48	24	7	17	68	52	+16	50.00

Source: Soccerway

=== Ligue 1 ===
==== League table ====
Pos	Team	Pld	W	D	L	GF	GA	GD	Pts	Qualification or relegation
1	Paris Saint-Germain (C)	34	24	4	6	74	29	+45	76	Qualification for the Champions League league phase
2	Lens	34	22	4	8	66	35	+31	70	Qualification for the Champions League league phase
3	Lille	34	18	7	9	52	37	+15	61	Qualification for the Champions League league phase
4	Lyon	34	18	6	10	53	40	+13	60	Qualification for the Champions League third qualifying round
5	Marseille	34	18	5	11	63	45	+18	59	Qualification for the Europa League league phase (Note: Since the 2025–26 Coupe de France winners, Lens, qualified for the Champions League via league position, the Europa League spot awarded to the cup winners was passed to the sixth-placed team, and the Conference League spot was passed to the seventh-placed team.)

Source: Ligue 1
Rules for classification: 1) Points; 2) Goal difference; 3) Head-to-head points; 4) Head-to-head goal difference; 5) Head-to-head goals scored; 6) Head-to-head away goals scored; 7) Goals scored; 8) Away goals scored; 9) Fair-play points (Note: Head-to-head record is used only after all the matches between the teams in question have been played).
(C) Champions

==== Results summary ====
Overall								Home						Away					
Pld	W	D	L	GF	GA	GD	Pts	W	D	L	GF	GA	GD	W	D	L	GF	GA	GD
34	18	7	9	52	37	+15	61	8	5	4	24	17	+7	10	2	5	28	20	+8

Source: Ligue 1

==== Results by round ====
Round	1	2	3	4	5	6	7	8	9	10	11	12	13	14	15	16	17	18	19	20	21	22	23	24	25	26	27	28	29	30	31	32	33	34
Ground	A	H	A	H	A	H	H	A	H	A	H	A	H	A	H	A	H	A	H	A	A	H	A	H	H	A	A	H	A	H	A	H	A	H
Result	D	W	W	W	L	L	D	W	W	L	W	L	W	W	W	W	L	L	L	L	D	D	W	W	D	W	W	W	W	D	W	D	W	L
Position	10	5	3	2	5	6	7	6	5	7	4	5	4	4	4	4	4	5	5	5	5	5	5	5	6	5	5	3	3	4	4	4	3	3
Points	1	4	7	10	10	10	11	14	17	17	20	20	23	26	29	32	32	32	32	32	33	34	37	40	41	44	47	50	53	54	57	58	61	61

Source: Ligue 1
A = Away; H = Home; W = Win; D = Draw; L = Loss

==== Matches ====
The match schedule was released on 27 June 2025.

17 August 2025 1	Brest	3–3	Lille	Brest
15:00 CEST (UTC+2)	Doumbia (yellow card) 18', (goal) 34', 51'; Chardonnet (yellow card) 35'; Le Cardinal 75'	Report	Giroud 11'; Ngoy (yellow card) 15'; Haraldsson 26'; Mukau 66'	Stadium: Stade Francis-Le Blé; Attendance: 14,840; Referee: Clément Turpin

24 August 2025 2	Lille	1–0	Monaco	Villeneuve-d'Ascq
20:45 CEST (UTC+2)	Bentaleb (yellow card) 86'; Giroud 90+1', (penalty missed) 90+9'	Report	Camara (yellow card) 87'; Mawissa (yellow card) 90+8'	Stadium: Stade Pierre-Mauroy; Attendance: 43,549; Referee: Willy Delajod

30 August 2025 3	Lorient	1–7	Lille	Lorient
17:00 CEST (UTC+2)	Avom (yellow card) 28'; Faye (yellow card) 37'; Soumano (penalty missed) 64'; Tosin 64'; Abergel (yellow card) 73'	Report	Fernandez-Pardo (yellow card) 40', (goal) 53', 77'; Perraud 46', (yellow card) 69'; André (yellow card) 59'; Igamane 80', 90+3'; Haraldsson 87'; Sahraoui 90+5'	Stadium: Stade du Moustoir; Attendance: 15,512; Referee: Romain Lissorgue

14 September 2025 4	Lille	2–1	Toulouse	Villeneuve-d'Ascq
15:00 CEST (UTC+2)	Giroud (yellow card) 83'; Bentaleb 90' (pen.); Mbemba (yellow card) 90+6'; Mbappé 90+8'	Report	Dønnum (yellow card) 23'; Magri 50', (yellow card) 88'; Restes (yellow card) 56'; Vossah (red card) 80'	Stadium: Stade Pierre-Mauroy; Attendance: 42,576; Referee: Jérémy Stinat

20 September 2025 5	Lens	3–0	Lille	Lens
21:05 CEST (UTC+2)	Saïd 28'; Thauvin 43'; Fofana 52'; Udol (yellow card) 83'	Report	Verdonk (yellow card) 36'; Mandi (yellow card) 45+1'; Mbemba (yellow card) 90+5'	Stadium: Stade Bollaert-Delelis; Attendance: 38,223; Referee: Eric Wattellier

28 September 2025 6	Lille	0–1	Lyon	Villeneuve-d'Ascq
17:15 CEST (UTC+2)	Bouaddi (yellow card) 43'; Mandi (yellow card) 69'; Fernandez-Pardo (yellow card) 86'; Igamane (yellow card) 87'	Report	Morton 13'; Tagliafico (yellow card) 46'; Fofana (yellow card) 72'; Moreira (yellow card) 76'; Šulc (yellow card) 83'	Stadium: Stade Pierre-Mauroy; Attendance: 45,287; Referee: Mathieu Vernice

5 October 2025 7	Lille	1–1	Paris Saint-Germain	Villeneuve-d'Ascq
20:45 CEST (UTC+2)	Mbappé 85'; André (yellow card) 88'	Report	Hernandez (yellow card) 45+1'; Mendes 66'	Stadium: Stade Pierre-Mauroy; Attendance: 47,355; Referee: Benoît Bastien

19 October 2025 8	Nantes	0–2	Lille	Nantes
20:45 CEST (UTC+2)	Awaziem (yellow card) 87'	Report	Haraldsson 8'; Meunier (yellow card) 21'; André (yellow card) 67'; Bouaddi (yellow card) 74'; Perraud (yellow card) 81'; Igamane (yellow card) 87'; Igamane 89'	Stadium: Stade de la Beaujoire; Attendance: 29,845; Referee: Thomas Léonard

26 October 2025 9	Lille	6–1	Metz	Villeneuve-d'Ascq
15:00 CET (UTC+1)	Mandi (yellow card) 22'; Igamane 24'; Correia 34', 53'; Bouaddi (yellow card) 36'; Perraud 64'; André 82'; Haraldsson 90+3', (yellow card) 90+10'	Report	Mélières (yellow card) 62'; Deminguet (yellow card) 89'; Sané 90+5'	Stadium: Stade Pierre-Mauroy; Attendance: 42,089; Referee: Benoît Millot

29 October 2025 10	Nice	2–0	Lille	Nice
19:00 CET (UTC+1)	Diop 29' (pen.); Vanhoutte (yellow card) 35'; Mendy (yellow card) 35'; Gouveia (yellow card) 78'; Jansson 87'	Report	Bouaddi (yellow card) 40'; André (yellow card) 75'; Haraldsson (yellow card) 82'	Stadium: Allianz Riviera; Attendance: 22,441; Referee: Bastien Dechepy

2 November 2025 11	Lille	1–0	Angers	Villeneuve-d'Ascq
17:15 CET (UTC+1)	Correia 45+3'; Verdonk (yellow card) 88'	Report		Stadium: Stade Pierre-Mauroy; Attendance: 38,802; Referee: Jérôme Brisard

9 November 2025 12	Strasbourg	2–0	Lille	Strasbourg
17:15 CET (UTC+1)	Emegha 33', 62'; Panichelli (yellow card) 35'; Enciso (yellow card) 37'; Chilwell (yellow card) 65'; Penders (yellow card) 80'	Report	Perraud (yellow card) 37'; Verdonk (red card) 90+5'; André (yellow card) 90+5'; Mukau (yellow card) 90+7'	Stadium: Stade de la Meinau; Attendance: 29,000; Referee: François Letexier

23 November 2025 13	Lille	4–2	Paris FC	Villeneuve-d'Ascq
20:45 CET (UTC+1)	Igamane (yellow card) 29'; Giroud 40', 77' (pen.); Mandi 80'; Broholm 90+6' (pen.)	Report	Geubbels 11'; Traoré (yellow card) 66'; Doucet 84', (yellow card) 90+4'	Stadium: Stade Pierre-Mauroy; Attendance: 39,053; Referee: Benoît Millot

30 November 2025 14	Le Havre	0–1	Lille	Le Havre
17:15 CET (UTC+1)	Samatta (yellow card) 82'	Report	Ngoy (yellow card) 45+2'; Meunier (yellow card) 45+3'; Bouaddi (red card) 51'; Igamane 88'; Haraldsson (yellow card) 90+1'	Stadium: Stade Océane; Attendance: 20,689; Referee: Willy Delajod

5 December 2025 15	Lille	1–0	Marseille	Villeneuve-d'Ascq
21:00 CET (UTC+1)	Mbappé 10'; Özer (yellow card) 90+1'	Report	Vermeeren (yellow card) 26'	Stadium: Stade Pierre-Mauroy; Attendance: 48,258; Referee: Jérôme Brisard

14 December 2025 16	Auxerre	3–4	Lille	Auxerre
17:15 CET (UTC+1)	Casimir (yellow card) 17'; Akpa (yellow card) 49' (yellow-red card) 60'; Sinayoko 57'; Mbemba 66' (o.g.); Sinayoko 83' (pen.); El Azzouzi (red card) 88'; Danois (yellow card) 88'; Coulibaly (yellow card) 90+3'	Report	Haraldsson 9'; Ngoy (red card) 39'; Mandi (yellow card) 49'; Bentaleb 77'; Diaoune 80'; Correia (yellow card) 82'; André 86'; Perraud (red card) 88'	Stadium: Stade de l'Abbé-Deschamps; Attendance: 16,124; Referee: Jérémie Pignard

3 January 2026 17	Lille	0–2	Rennes	Villeneuve-d'Ascq
21:05 CET (UTC+1)	Alexsandro (red card) 13'; André (yellow card) 14'	Report	Jacquet (yellow card) 30'; Frankowski 49'; Merlin 56'	Stadium: Stade Pierre-Mauroy; Attendance: 41,527; Referee: Eric Wattellier

16 January 2026 18	Paris Saint-Germain	3–0	Lille	Paris
21:00 CET (UTC+1)	Dembélé 13', 64'; Barcola 90+3'	Report	Haraldsson (yellow card) 62'	Stadium: Parc des Princes; Attendance: 46,909; Referee: Jérôme Brisard

25 January 2026 19	Lille	1–4	Strasbourg	Villeneuve-d'Ascq
20:45 CET (UTC+1)	Bouaddi (yellow card) 36'; Perraud (yellow card) 63'; Fernandez-Pardo 90+3'	Report	Panichelli 25'; Enciso 26'; Doué (yellow card) 36'; El Mourabet (yellow card) 55'; Godo 58', 72'	Stadium: Stade Pierre-Mauroy; Attendance: 38,551; Referee: Willy Delajod

1 February 2026 20	Lyon	1–0	Lille	Décines-Charpieu
15:00 CET (UTC+1)	Nartey 37'; Maitland-Niles (yellow card) 90'	Report	Mandi (yellow card) 42'; Ngoy (yellow card) 46'; Mukau (yellow card) 61'; Fernandez-Pardo (yellow card) 85'	Stadium: Parc Olympique Lyonnais; Attendance: 56,150; Referee: François Letexier

6 February 2026 21	Metz	0–0	Lille	Metz
20:45 CET (UTC+1)	Kouao (yellow card) 73'	Report	Fernandez-Pardo (yellow card) 7'	Stadium: Stade Saint-Symphorien; Attendance: 20,378; Referee: Guillaume Paradis

14 February 2026 22	Lille	1–1	Brest	Villeneuve-d'Ascq
19:00 CET (UTC+1)	Perrin 71'	Report	Lascary 58'; Ajorque (yellow card) 64'	Stadium: Stade Pierre-Mauroy; Attendance: 44,145; Referee: Hakim Ben El Hadj

22 February 2026 23	Angers	0–1	Lille	Angers
17:15 CET (UTC+1)	Van den Boomen (yellow card) 21'; Belkhdim (yellow card) 27'; Koffi (yellow card) 90'	Report	Ngoy (yellow card) 36'; Giroud 45+2' (pen.)	Stadium: Stade Raymond Kopa; Attendance: 0 Referee: Mathieu Vernice
Note: The match was played behind closed doors due to flood warnings.

1 March 2026 24	Lille	1–0	Nantes	Villeneuve-d'Ascq
17:15 CET (UTC+1)	André (yellow card) 76'; Giroud (yellow card) 76'; Ngoy 90+4', (yellow card) 90+4'	Report	Kaba (yellow card) 17'	Stadium: Stade Pierre-Mauroy; Attendance: 39,161; Referee: Thomas Léonard

8 March 2026 25	Lille	1–1	Lorient	Villeneuve-d'Ascq
17:15 CET (UTC+1)	Perrin (yellow card) 22'; Mandi (yellow card) 32'; Özer (yellow card) 32'; Fernandez-Pardo 65'; Bentaleb (yellow card) 90+1'	Report	Meïté (yellow card) 55'; Avom 90+3'	Stadium: Stade Pierre-Mauroy; Attendance: 42,082; Referee: Abdelatif Kherradji

15 March 2026 26	Rennes	1–2	Lille	Rennes
20:45 CET (UTC+1)	Lepaul 59'; Nagida (yellow card) 65'; Frankowski (yellow card) 84'	Report	Fernandez-Pardo 2'; Bentaleb (yellow card) 16'; Haraldsson 47'; Özer (yellow card) 71'; Mandi (yellow card) 73'; Correia (yellow card) 84'; Ngoy (yellow card) 90+2'	Stadium: Roazhon Park; Attendance: 28,219; Referee: Jérôme Brisard

22 March 2026 27	Marseille	1–2	Lille	Marseille
17:15 CET (UTC+1)	Greenwood (yellow card) 13'; Nwaneri 43'	Report	Ngoy (yellow card) 1'; Verdonk (yellow card) 13'; Haraldsson (yellow card) 13'; Meunier 49'; Giroud 86'	Stadium: Stade Vélodrome; Attendance: 59,865; Referee: Benoît Bastien

4 April 2026 28	Lille	3–0	Lens	Villeneuve-d'Ascq
21:05 CEST (UTC+2)	Haraldsson 44'; Ngoy (yellow card) 45+5'; Correia 49'; Fernandez-Pardo 58' (pen.); Özer (yellow card) 71'; Mbappé (yellow card) 89'	Report	Thomasson (yellow card) 45+5'; Abdulhamid (yellow card) 78'	Stadium: Stade Pierre-Mauroy; Attendance: 48,491; Referee: François Letexier

12 April 2026 29	Toulouse	0–4	Lille	Toulouse
17:15 CEST (UTC+2)	McKenzie (red card) 48'; Emersonn (yellow card) 63'; Methalie (yellow card) 80'	Report	Nicolaisen 23' (o.g.); Perraud 50'; Fernandez-Pardo 55'; Giroud 88' (pen.)	Stadium: Stadium de Toulouse; Attendance: 24,568; Referee: Hakim Ben El Hadj

18 April 2026 30	Lille	0–0	Nice	Villeneuve-d'Ascq
21:05 CEST (UTC+2)	Mukau (yellow card) 21'; Mbemba (yellow card) 30'; Özer (yellow card) 90+8'	Report	Jansson (yellow card) 90+7'	Stadium: Stade Pierre-Mauroy; Attendance: 40,159; Referee: Bastien Dechepy

26 April 2026 31	Paris FC	0–1	Lille	Paris
17:15 CEST (UTC+2)	Mbow (yellow card) 10'; Ikoné (yellow card) 72'; Kebbal (penalty missed) 74', (yellow card) 90'; Lees-Melou (yellow card) 84' (yellow-red card) 85'; Gory (yellow card) 90+4'	Report	Fernandez-Pardo 26' (pen.); Bouaddi (yellow card) 49'; André (yellow card) 63'; Ngoy (yellow card) 90+4'	Stadium: Stade Jean-Bouin; Attendance: 17,243; Referee: Mathieu Vernice

3 May 2026 32	Lille	1–1	Le Havre	Villeneuve-d'Ascq
15:00 CEST (UTC+2)	Haraldsson 29'; Meunier (yellow card) 43'; Mandi (yellow card) 59'	Report	Gourna-Douath (yellow card) 5'; Soumaré 33', (yellow card) 74'; Seko (yellow card) 35'	Stadium: Stade Pierre-Mauroy; Attendance: 44,378; Referee: Guillaume Paradis

10 May 2026 33	Monaco	0–1	Lille	Monaco
21:00 CEST (UTC+2)	Coulibaly (yellow card) 79'	Report	Bouaddi (yellow card) 23'; Fernandez-Pardo (yellow card) 54'; Zakaria 72' (o.g.); Perrin (yellow card) 75'	Stadium: Stade Louis II; Attendance: 8,314; Referee: Clément Turpin

17 May 2026 34	Lille	0–2	Auxerre	Villeneuve-d'Ascq
21:00 CEST (UTC+2)	Haraldsson (yellow card) 40'; Ngoy (yellow card) 43'; André (yellow card) 60'	Report	Sinayoko 32', 90'; Namaso (yellow card) 67'; Léon (yellow card) 81'	Stadium: Stade Pierre-Mauroy; Attendance: 47,097; Referee: Willy Delajod

=== Coupe de France ===
20 December 2025 Round of 64	Saint-Maur	0–1	Lille	Créteil
15:30 CET (UTC+1)	Baku (yellow card) 42'	Report	Haraldsson (yellow card) 53'; André (yellow card) 53'; Broholm 80'	Stadium: Stade Dominique Duvauchelle; Attendance: 6,576; Referee: Mikael Lesage

11 January 2026 Round of 32	Lille	1–2	Lyon	Villeneuve-d'Ascq
21:00 CET (UTC+1)	Ngoy 28'; Haraldsson (yellow card) 37'; Perraud (yellow card) 64'	Report	Moreira 1'; Šulc (yellow card) 31'; Morton (yellow card) 32'; Endrick 42'; Descamps (yellow card) 90+1'	Stadium: Stade Pierre-Mauroy; Attendance: 20,333; Referee: Clément Turpin

=== UEFA Europa League ===
==== League phase ====
The draw for the league phase was held on 29 August 2025.

Pos	Team	Pld	W	D	L	GF	GA	GD	Pts	Qualification
16	(Royal Spanish Football Federation) Celta Vigo	8	4	1	3	15	11	+4	13	Advance to knockout phase play-offs (seeded)
17	(Hellenic Football Federation) PAOK	8	3	3	2	17	14	+3	12	Advance to knockout phase play-offs (unseeded)
18	(French Football Federation) Lille	8	4	0	4	12	9	+3	12	Advance to knockout phase play-offs (unseeded)
19	(Turkish Football Federation) Fenerbahçe	8	3	3	2	10	7	+3	12	Advance to knockout phase play-offs (unseeded)
20	(Hellenic Football Federation) Panathinaikos	8	3	3	2	11	9	+2	12	Advance to knockout phase play-offs (unseeded)

Source: UEFA
Rules for classification: League phase tiebreakers

Round	1	2	3	4	5	6	7	8
Ground	H	A	H	A	H	A	A	H
Result	W	W	L	L	W	L	L	W
Position	6	6	11	19	11	20	21	18
Points	3	6	6	6	9	9	9	12

Source: UEFA
A = Away; H = Home; W = Win; D = Draw; L = Loss

25 September 2025 1	Lille (France)	2–1	(Norway) Brann	Villeneuve-d'Ascq, France
18:45 CEST (UTC+2)	Igamane 54'; Giroud 80'; Mukau (yellow card) 90+2'	Report	Castro (yellow card) 17'; Magnússon 60', (yellow card) 69'	Stadium: Stade Pierre-Mauroy; Attendance: 17,529; Referee: Allard Lindhout (Netherlands)

2 October 2025 2	Roma (Italy)	0–1	(France) Lille	Rome, Italy
18:45 CEST (UTC+2)	Soulé (penalty missed) 85'	Report	Haraldsson 6'; Verdonk (yellow card) 9'; Bouaddi (yellow card) 61'; Mandi (yellow card) 81'; Özer (yellow card) 90+3'	Stadium: Stadio Olimpico; Attendance: 61,561; Referee: Erik Lambrechts (Belgium)

23 October 2025 3	Lille (France)	3–4	(Greece) PAOK	Villeneuve-d'Ascq, France
21:00 CEST (UTC+2)	Raghouber (yellow card) 53'; André 57'; Igamane 68', 78'	Report	Meïté 18'; Živković 23', 74', (yellow card) 29', (penalty missed) 71'; Konstantelias 42'; Kędziora (yellow card) 44' (yellow-red card) 90+9'; Tsiftsis (yellow card) 90+2'; Giakoumakis (yellow card) 90+5'	Stadium: Stade Pierre-Mauroy; Attendance: 23,666; Referee: Nikola Dabanović (Montenegro)

6 November 2025 4	Red Star Belgrade (Serbia)	1–0	(France) Lille	Belgrade, Serbia
18:45 CET (UTC+1)	Radonjić (yellow card) 18'; Arnautović (yellow card) 66', (goal) 85' (pen.); Matheus (yellow card) 90+1'	Report	Özer (yellow card) 84'; Fernandez-Pardo (yellow card) 90+3'; Bentaleb (yellow card) 90+7'; Perraud (yellow card) 90+7'	Stadium: Red Star Stadium; Attendance: 32,711; Referee: John Brooks (England)

27 November 2025 5	Lille (France)	4–0	(Croatia) Dinamo Zagreb	Villeneuve-d'Ascq, France
18:45 CET (UTC+1)	Correia 21'; Mukau 36'; Igamane (yellow card) 31', (goal) 69'; Ngoy (yellow card) 61'; André 86'	Report	Varela (yellow card) 87'	Stadium: Stade Pierre-Mauroy; Attendance: 22,146; Referee: John Beaton (Scotland)

11 December 2025 6	Young Boys (Switzerland)	1–0	(France) Lille	Bern, Switzerland
18:45 CET (UTC+1)	Bedia (penalty missed) 35'; Maleš 61'; Zoukrou (yellow card) 90' (yellow-red card) 90+2'	Report	Bouaddi (red card) 32'; Giroud (yellow card) 33'	Stadium: Stadion Wankdorf; Attendance: 20,168; Referee: Sander van der Eijk (Netherlands)

22 January 2026 7	Celta Vigo (Spain)	2–1	(France) Lille	Vigo, Spain
21:00 CET (UTC+1)	Swedberg 1', (yellow card) 64'; Sotelo (red card) 29'; Alonso (yellow card) 31'; Mingueza (yellow card) 33'; Starfelt 69'; Radu (yellow card) 82'	Report	Ngoy (yellow card) 32'; Mandi (yellow card) 40'; Giroud 86'	Stadium: Balaídos; Attendance: 20,015; Referee: Harm Osmers (Germany)

29 January 2026 8	Lille (France)	1–0	(Germany) SC Freiburg	Villeneuve-d'Ascq, France
21:00 CET (UTC+1)	André (yellow card) 72'; Haraldsson (yellow card) 86'; Giroud 90+2' (pen.)	Report	Eggestein (red card) 74'	Stadium: Stade Pierre-Mauroy; Attendance: 22,583; Referee: Damian Sylwestrzak (Poland)

==== Knockout phase ====
===== Knockout phase play-offs =====
The draw for the knockout phase play-offs was held on 30 January 2026.

19 February 2026 First leg	Lille (France)	0–1	(Serbia) Red Star Belgrade	Villeneuve-d'Ascq, France
21:00 CET (UTC+1)	Correia (yellow card) 40'	Report	Tebo Uchenna 45+1'; Lučić (yellow card) 82'; Matheus (yellow card) 89'; Young-woo (yellow card) 89'	Stadium: Stade Pierre-Mauroy; Attendance: 22,087; Referee: Sven Jablonski (Germany)

26 February 2026 Second leg	Red Star Belgrade (Serbia)	0–2 (a.e.t.) (1–2 agg.)	(France) Lille	Belgrade, Serbia
18:45 CET (UTC+1)	Uchenna (yellow card) 36'; Händel (yellow card) 69'; Avdić (yellow card) 120+1'	Report	Giroud 4'; Bouaddi (yellow card) 52'; Ngoy 99'	Stadium: Rajko Mitić Stadium; Attendance: 46,477; Referee: Anthony Taylor (England)

===== Round of 16 =====
The draw for the round of 16 was held on 27 February 2026.

12 March 2026 First leg	Lille (France)	0–1	(England) Aston Villa	Villeneuve-d'Ascq, France
18:45 CET (UTC+1)		Report	Watkins 61'; Martínez (yellow card) 88'; Digne (yellow card) 90+2'	Stadium: Stade Pierre-Mauroy; Attendance: 40,187; Referee: José María Sánchez Martínez (Spain)

19 March 2026 Second leg	Aston Villa (England)	2–0 (3–0 agg.)	(France) Lille	Birmingham, England
20:00 GMT (UTC±0)	McGinn 54'; Douglas Luiz (yellow card) 72'; Bailey 86'	Report	Correia (yellow card) 25'	Stadium: Villa Park; Attendance: 37,583; Referee: Davide Massa (Italy)

== Statistics ==
=== Appearances and goals ===
No.	Pos	Nat	Player	Total		Ligue 1		Coupe de France		Europa League	
No.	Pos	Nat	Player	Apps	Goals	Apps	Goals	Apps	Goals	Apps	Goals
Goalkeepers
1	GK	(Turkey) TUR	Berke Özer	44	0	32	0	0	0	12	0
16	GK	(Belgium) BEL	Arnaud Bodart	5	0	2+1	0	2	0	0	0
30	GK	(France) FRA	Marc-Aurèle Caillard	0	0	0	0	0	0	0	0
Defenders
3	DF	(Belgium) BEL	Nathan Ngoy	38	3	27+2	1	1	1	7+1	1
4	DF	(Brazil) BRA	Alexsandro	11	0	7+2	0	0	0	2	0
12	DF	(Belgium) BEL	Thomas Meunier	35	1	21+4	1	2	0	5+3	0
15	DF	(France) FRA	Romain Perraud	41	3	27+3	3	1	0	7+3	0
18	DF	(Democratic Republic of the Congo) COD	Chancel Mbemba	21	0	9+4	0	0	0	7+1	0
22	DF	(Portugal) POR	Tiago Santos	27	0	8+6	0	1+1	0	6+5	0
23	DF	(Algeria) ALG	Aïssa Mandi	40	1	28+1	1	0	0	8+3	0
24	DF	(Indonesia) IDN	Calvin Verdonk	26	0	7+11	0	0+1	0	5+2	0
36	DF	(France) FRA	Ousmane Touré	1	0	1	0	0	0	0	0
44	DF	(France) FRA	Maxima Goffi	3	0	0+1	0	1	0	1	0
Midfielders
6	MF	(Algeria) ALG	Nabil Bentaleb	37	2	13+13	2	2	0	7+2	0
10	MF	(Iceland) ISL	Hákon Haraldsson	46	9	29+3	8	2	0	9+3	1
17	MF	(Democratic Republic of the Congo) COD	Ngal'ayel Mukau	42	2	19+11	1	0+1	0	9+2	1
21	MF	(France) FRA	Benjamin André	37	4	26+1	2	2	0	7+1	2
26	MF	(Portugal) POR	André Gomes	2	0	0+2	0	0	0	0	0
28	MF	(France) FRA	Gaëtan Perrin	14	1	3+8	1	0	0	3	0
32	MF	(France) FRA	Ayyoub Bouaddi	42	0	28+2	0	2	0	7+3	0
35	MF	(France) FRA	Soriba Diaoune	17	1	1+9	1	0+2	0	0+5	0
Forwards
7	FW	(Belgium) BEL	Matias Fernandez-Pardo	41	8	27+2	8	1	0	5+6	0
8	FW	(France) FRA	Ethan Mbappé	22	3	4+14	3	1+1	0	0+2	0
9	FW	(France) FRA	Olivier Giroud	44	11	17+13	7	2	0	6+6	4
11	FW	(Morocco) MAR	Osame Sahraoui	25	1	4+14	1	0+2	0	3+2	0
14	FW	(Norway) NOR	Marius Broholm	14	2	3+8	1	0+1	1	2	0
20	FW	(France) FRA	Noah Edjouma	5	0	0+3	0	0	0	0+2	0
27	FW	(Portugal) POR	Félix Correia	48	5	26+8	4	2	0	9+3	1
29	FW	(Morocco) MAR	Hamza Igamane	18	9	4+9	5	0	0	4+1	4
Players loaned out during the season
28	MF	(France) FRA	Ugo Raghouber	3	0	0+2	0	0	0	1	0
41	DF	(Belgium) BEL	Vincent Burlet	1	0	0+1	0	0	0	0	0

Source: Competitions
