= Julien Kouadio =

Central African Republic footballer

Personal information
- Date of birth: 22 September 1999 (age 27)
- Place of birth: Lyon, France
- Height: 1.75 m (5 ft 9 in)
- Position: Centre-back

Team information
- Current team: Annecy
- Number: 27

Youth career
- Clermont
- 2017–2018: Moulins Yzeure

Senior career*
Years	Team	Apps	(Gls)
2018–2021	Moulins Yzeure	32	(0)
2021–2023	GOAL FC	53	(2)
2023–2024	Villefranche	30	(2)
2024–	Annecy	51	(0)

International career^{‡}
2026–	Central African Republic	1	(0)
- * Club domestic league appearances and goals as of 7 June 2026 ‡ National team caps and goals as of 7 June 2026

Julien Kouadio (born 22 September 1999 in Lyon) is a footballer who plays as a centre back for FC Annecy in Ligue 2. Born in France, he plays for the Central African Republic national team.

== Club career ==
Kouadio began his career in the lower divisions of French football,game. His family financed his first season at Moulins Yzeure where he was not paid, in order to give him the best chance of breaking through. He subsequently joined GOAL FC, where he helped the club win promotion to the National division, before moving to Villefranche.

Kouadio joined FC Annecy on a free transfer in July 2024. He established himself as a regular starter in Ligue 2, making 47 appearances across two seasons.

== International career ==
Kouadio was born in France to an Ivorian father and Central African mother. In March 2026, he received his first senior call-up to the Central African Republic national team.

He made his senior debut on 5 June 2026, appearing in the 1–1 international friendly draw against Togo at the Stade El Bachir in Mohammédia, Morocco.
