= 2026–27 Manchester City F.C. season =

English football club season

Manchester City
2026–27 season
- Owner: City Football Group
- Chairman: Khaldoon Al Mubarak
- Manager: Enzo Maresca
- Stadium: Etihad Stadium
- Premier League: 3rd
- FA Cup: Third round
- EFL Cup: Quarter-finals
- FA Community Shield: Runners-up
- UEFA Champions League: League phase
- Top goalscorer: League: Erling Haaland (9); All: Erling Haaland (14)
- Highest home attendance: 60,817 v Ipswich Town; 17 October 2026 (Premier League)
- Lowest home attendance: 32,451 v Norwich City; 17 September 2026 (EFL Cup)
- Average home league attendance: 60,513
- Biggest win: 5–0 v Norwich City (Home); 17 September 2026 (EFL Cup)
- Biggest defeat: 0–3 v Arsenal (Neutral); 16 August 2026 (Community Shield)
Home colours	Away colours	Third colours

The 2026–27 season is the 132nd season in the existence of Manchester City Football Club and their 25th consecutive season in the top flight of England football. In addition to the domestic league, Manchester City is also participating in the FA Cup, EFL Cup, FA Community Shield and UEFA Champions League, entering the latter for the 16th consecutive season.

This is the club's first season since 2015–16 without Pep Guardiola as manager following his resignation at the conclusion of the previous campaign. He was replaced with Enzo Maresca in June 2026. It is also the first season since 2015–16 not to feature John Stones, the first since 2016–17 not to feature Bernardo Silva, and the first since 2018–19 not to feature Rodri, who all departed that summer.

City were beaten 3–0 by Arsenal in the FA Community Shield on 16 August, but went onto record seven straight wins in the league to begin the season.

In September 2026, it was announced that the club had been found guilty of the majority of charges related to breaching the Premier League's financial regulations between 2009 and 2018.

== Kit ==
Supplier: Puma / Sponsor: Etihad Airways (Front) / OKX (Sleeves)

Home	Home alt.	Away	Away alt.	Third	Third alt. 1	Third alt. 2

== Season summary ==
=== Pre-season ===
Manchester City began their preparations for the 2026–27 campaign with the appointment of Enzo Maresca as manager on 29 June 2026, succeeding Pep Guardiola following his departure at the end of the previous season. Maresca's arrival marked the beginning of a transitional summer, with the club expected to reshape key areas of the squad after the exits of long-serving players John Stones and Bernardo Silva.

City's pre-season planning was shaped significantly by the 2026 FIFA World Cup, with a large portion of the first-team squad involved in the knockout stages of the tournament, including key figures such as Erling Haaland, Rodri and Jérémy Doku; resulting in staggered returns to training and a reduced senior group available for the opening weeks of pre-season. In all, six first team players remained in competition with England, Spain and France in the final week of competition.

Transfer activity during June and early July focused on reinforcing the defensive line and adding depth in midfield, with City linked to multiple right-backs and a progressive midfielder suited to Maresca's possession-focused approach. The club also monitored potential additions in wide attacking positions, aiming to increase flexibility across the forward line.

A major development in early July was the imminent signing of Elliot Anderson from Nottingham Forest, with reports indicating that City had agreed a club-record fee of £116 million for the midfielder as part of Maresca's restructuring of the squad. The club later confirmed the transfer was agreed, and formalities were completed when the player returned from his World Cup duties on 23 July.

Following his Golden Ball-winning performances at the 2026 FIFA World Cup, where he'd captained Spain to their second title, Rodri was widely linked with a return to La Liga during the summer transfer window. Reports in Spanish and English media suggested interest from both Real Madrid and Barcelona, with negotiations involving Madrid reportedly stalling in late July before Barcelona intensified their pursuit. Manchester City maintained that Rodri was not for sale, though several outlets claimed the club might consider a transfer in the final year of his contract, with figures between £60m and €75m mentioned. Barcelona were also reported to have agreed personal terms with the player, while Real Madrid explored reviving their interest. The deal with Barcelona was eventually concluded on 18 August for a reported fee of around £65 million.

=== Start of season ===
Manchester City began the season with a 3–0 defeat to Arsenal in the Community Shield at the Principality Stadium, marking Enzo Maresca's first competitive match in charge. Arsenal struck inside 23 seconds through Riccardo Calafiori before Kai Havertz doubled the lead with a header midway through the first half. Martin Ødegaard added a third shortly after the interval, finishing a move created by Christos Tzolis, who impressed with two assists. City created chances through Phil Foden and Antoine Semenyo but were unable to beat David Raya, suffering their heaviest Community Shield loss since losing by the same score-line to Arsenal in 2014.

As the 2026 summer transfer window moved into its final days, Manchester City oversaw a significant reshaping of the squad with several senior departures and targeted reinforcements. Winger Savinho completed a club-record move to Tottenham Hotspur, while midfielder Tijjani Reijnders left for Saudi Pro League side Al-Qadsiah after just one season in Manchester.

Forward Omar Marmoush also moved towards the exit, with a loan deal agreed for him to join Tottenham as part of the London club’s late-window attacking rebuild. Meanwhile, midfielder Nico González was made available for transfer and subsequently departed for Newcastle as City continued their broader midfield restructuring.

City simultaneously strengthened key areas of the squad. Teenage central midfielder Ayyoub Bouaddi arrived from Lille in a major deal reflecting the club’s long-term recruitment strategy, while World Cup-winning midfielder Enzo Fernández joined from Chelsea on a record breaking fee, in one of the window’s most notable Premier League transfers; adding immediate quality and depth to Enzo Maresca’s central options. The club also secured the signing of Brazilian winger Allan from Palmeiras, viewed as a versatile addition capable of operating both as a winger and attacking wing back; and Senegalese winger Iliman Ndiaye from Everton to add further quality in wide areas. Jack Grealish left on loan to Everton for the second consecutive season for the final year of his City contract.

City started their season strongly, maintaining a 100% winning record in five league fixtures and their opening matches in both the EFL Cup and UEFA Champions League by the time of the international break at the end of September. This run placed them top of the early Premier League table, three points clear of Arsenal.

=== Decision of the independent commission into financial irregularities ===
In late September 2026, multiple reports revealed Manchester City had been found guilty of 114 charges related to breaching the Premier League's financial regulations between 2009 to 2018. An independent commission concluded the club did not accurately report its finances - including by inflating sponsorship contracts to disguise owner funding - improperly structured or insufficiently disclosed manager and player remuneration figures, such as those related to image‑rights payments, and failed to co-operate with League's investigation or comply with UEFA's financial regulations over a prolonged period.

In a statement, Manchester City reiterated that the process "remains ongoing" and confirmed their intention to appeal.

== First-team squad ==
As of 2 September 2026

No.	Player	Position	Nationality	Date of birth (age)	Signed from	Date signed	Fee	Contract end
Goalkeepers
1	Gianluigi Donnarumma (VC)	GK	(Italy)	25 February 1999 (age 27)	(France) Paris Saint-Germain	2 September 2025	£26.0m	2030
13	Marcus Bettinelli	GK	(England)	24 May 1992 (age 34)	Chelsea	10 June 2025	Free transfer	2027
28	Gerónimo Rulli	GK	(Argentina)	20 May 1992 (age 34)	(France) Marseille	12 August 2026	£1.7m	2028
Defenders
3	Rúben Dias (C)	CB	(Portugal)	14 May 1997 (age 29)	(Portugal) Benfica	29 September 2020	£62.0m (Note: City player Nicolás Otamendi was included in the deal, bringing the transfer fee paid to £50m.)	2029
6	Marc Guéhi (VC)	CB	(England)	13 July 2000 (age 26)	Crystal Palace	19 January 2026	£20.0m	2031
21	Rayan Aït-Nouri	LB	(Algeria)	6 June 2001 (age 25)	Wolverhampton Wanderers	9 June 2025	£31.3m	2030
22	Vitor Reis	CB / RB	(Brazil)	12 January 2006 (age 20)	(Brazil) Palmeiras	21 January 2025	£29.6m	2029
24	Joško Gvardiol	CB / LB	(Croatia)	23 January 2002 (age 24)	(Germany) RB Leipzig	5 August 2023	£77.5m	2031
27	Matheus Nunes	RB / CM	(Portugal)	27 August 1998 (age 28)	Wolverhampton Wanderers	1 September 2023	£53.0m	2028
45	Abdukodir Khusanov	CB / RB	(Uzbekistan)	29 February 2004 (age 22)	(France) Lens	20 January 2025	£33.6m	2031
61	Kaden Braithwaite	CB	(England)	8 February 2008 (age 18)	Academy	12 August 2025	—N/a	2030
82	Rico Lewis	RB / CM	(England)	21 November 2004 (age 22)	Academy	1 July 2022	—N/a	2030
Midfielders
5	Elliot Anderson	CM / DM	(England)	6 November 2002 (age 24)	Nottingham Forest	23 July 2026	£116.0m	2031
8	Mateo Kovačić	CM / DM	(Croatia)	6 May 1994 (age 32)	Chelsea	27 June 2023	£25.0m	2027
10	Rayan Cherki	AM / RW	(France)	17 August 2003 (age 23)	(France) Lyon	10 June 2025	£30.5m	2030
17	Enzo Fernández	AM / CM / DM	(Argentina)	17 January 2001 (age 25)	Chelsea	1 September 2026	£125.0m	2031
32	Ayyoub Bouaddi	CM / DM	(Morocco)	2 October 2007 (age 19)	(France) Lille	26 August 2026	£85.6m	2031
33	Nico O'Reilly	CM / LB / AM	(England)	21 March 2005 (age 21)	Academy	1 July 2022	—N/a	2030
47	Phil Foden	AM / LW / RW	(England)	28 May 2000 (age 26)	Academy	1 July 2017	—N/a	2030
Forwards
7	Iliman Ndiaye	LW / RW	(Senegal)	6 March 2000 (age 26)	Everton	1 September 2026	£65.0m	2031
9	Erling Haaland (VC)	ST	(Norway)	21 July 2000 (age 26)	(Germany) Borussia Dortmund	1 July 2022	£51.2m	2034
11	Jérémy Doku	LW / RW	(Belgium)	27 May 2002 (age 24)	(France) Rennes	24 August 2023	£55.5m	2031
37	Allan	RW / RB	(Brazil)	19 April 2004 (age 22)	(Brazil) Palmeiras	31 August 2026	£32.0m	2031
42	Antoine Semenyo	LW / RW	(Ghana)	7 January 2000 (age 26)	Bournemouth	9 January 2026	£64.0m	2031
56	Ryan McAidoo	RW	(England)	24 June 2008 (age 18)	Academy	12 August 2025	—N/a	2030
75	Floyd Samba	AM / ST	(France)	15 January 2009 (age 17)	Academy	14 August 2026	—N/a	2031

Includes first team players and EDS players who train routinely with the first team and have made at least one league appearance.

Key

# – Current EDS Squad player.
† – Signed in January window.
‡ – Initially signed to Academy team.

== Transfers and contracts ==
=== Transfers in ===
Date	Pos.	No.	Player	From	Fee	Ref.
27 June 2026	LW	—	(France) Mathys Detourbet	(France) Troyes	£21,700,000	
10 July 2026	GK	—	(Northern Ireland) Pierce Charles	Sheffield Wednesday	£3,000,000 (Note: A potential further £7,000,000 with add-ons.)	
11 July 2026	LW	40	(England) Jeremy Monga	Leicester City	£10,000,000 (Note: A potential further £2,500,000 with add-ons.)	
23 July 2026	CM	5	(England) Elliot Anderson	Nottingham Forest	£116,000,000	
12 August 2026	GK	28	(Argentina) Geronimo Rulli	(France) Marseille	£1,700,000	
26 August 2026	CM	32	(Morocco) Ayyoub Bouaddi	(France) Lille	£81,400,000 (Note: A potential further £4,200,000 with add-ons)	
31 August 2026	RW	37	(Brazil) Allan	(Brazil) Palmeiras	£32,000,000 (Note: A potential further £2,200,000 with add-ons)	
1 September 2026	RW	7	(Senegal) Iliman Ndiaye	Everton	£60,000,000 (Note: A potential further £5,000,000 with add-ons)	
1 September 2026	CM	17	(Argentina) Enzo Fernández	Chelsea	£125,000,000	
Total					£450,800,000	

=== Transfers out ===
Date	Pos.	No.	Player	To	Fee	Ref.
First team
1 July 2026	CB	25	(Switzerland) Manuel Akanji	(Italy) Inter Milan	£13,000,000	
3 July 2026	CB	6	(Netherlands) Nathan Aké	(Turkey) Fenerbahçe	£7,000,000 (Note: A potential further £1,500,000 in add-ons.)	
6 August 2026	GK	1	(England) James Trafford	Leeds United	£45,000,000	
18 August 2026	CDM	16	(Spain) Rodri	(Spain) Barcelona	£65,400,000	
19 August 2026	CM	4	(Netherlands) Tijjani Reijnders	(Saudi Arabia) Al-Qadsiah	£52,000,000	
25 August 2026	RW	26	(Brazil) Savinho	Tottenham Hotspur	£75,000,000 (Note: A potential further £10,000,000 in add-ons.)	
26 August 2026	CDM	14	(Spain) Nico González	Newcastle United	£48,000,000 (Note: A potential further £4,000,000 in add-ons.)	
Academy
1 July 2026 (Note: The transfer was announced on 9 June, and would become official on July 1 once the Bundesliga transfer window opened.)	CB	66	(England) Jahmai Simpson-Pusey	(Germany) 1. FC Köln	£4,650,000	
2 July 2026	CB	51	(England) Isaac Smith	Barnsley	Undisclosed	
7 July 2026	LB	74	(Finland) Tomas Galvez	(Netherlands) Go Ahead Eagles	£427,000	
17 July 2026	FW	92	(England) Reigan Heskey	(Germany) 1. FC Köln	£2,100,000 (Note: The deal could eventually rise up to £8 million)	
21 July 2026	FW	98	(England) Matty Warhurst	Northampton Town	£100,000	
29 July 2026	FW	73	(England) Joel Ndala	(Belgium) Cercle Brugge	£2,500,000	
14 August 2026	CB	94	(England) Finley Burns	Wigan Athletic	£200,000	
27 August 2026	RB	78	(Burkina Faso) Issa Kaboré	(Wales) Wrexham	£4,750,000	
6 September 2026	FW	71	(France) Mahamadou Sangaré	(Saudi Arabia) Al-Qadsiah	£1,700,000	
Total					£321,827,000	

=== Loaned out ===
Date	Pos.	No.	Player	Loaned to	On loan until	Ref.
First team
10 July 2026	GK	—	(Northern Ireland) Pierce Charles	Queens Park Rangers	End of season	
11 July 2026	CM	41	(Norway) Sverre Nypan	(Belgium) Lommel	End of season	
11 August 2026	CM	44	(England) Kalvin Phillips	Sheffield United	End of season	
14 August 2026	CB	68	(England) Max Alleyne	Burnley	End of season	
27 August 2026	CF	7	(Egypt) Omar Marmoush	Tottenham Hotspur	End of season	
1 September 2026	MF	18	(England) Jack Grealish	Everton	End of season	
1 September 2026	LW	40	(England) Jeremy Monga	(Wales) Swansea City	End of season	
2 September 2026	MF	30	(Argentina) Claudio Echeverri	(Portugal) Benfica	End of season	
Academy
1 July 2026	GK	72	(England) Oliver Whatmuff	Stockport County	End of season	
2 July 2026	LW	—	(France) Mathys Detourbet	(France) Monaco	End of season	
21 July 2026	GK	80	(England) Spike Brits	Sutton United	End of season	
29 July 2026	LB	46	(England) Christian McFarlane	Leicester City	End of season	
1 August 2026	CDM	64	(England) Isaiah Dada-Mascoll	(Belgium) Lommel	End of season	
1 August 2026	GK	84	(England) Jack Wint	Kidderminster Harriers	End of season	
11 August 2026	CF	67	(England) Divin Mubama	Southampton	End of season	
14 August 2026	FW	99	(Scotland) Emilio Lawrence	Luton Town	End of season	
14 August 2026	WB	95	(England) Lakyle Samuel	Exeter City	End of season	
20 August 2026	CDM	59	(England) Charlie Gray	Wigan Athletic	End of season	
21 August 2026	CAM	63	(England) Divine Mukasa	West Ham United	End of season	
30 August 2026	CB	91	(England) Stephen Mfuni	Coventry City	End of season	
1 September 2026	CM	81	(England) Jaden Heskey	Sheffield Wednesday	End of season	
1 September 2026	CB		(Sierra Leone) Juma Bah	(Germany) FC Augsburg	End of season	

=== Released ===
Date	Pos.	No.	Player	Subsequent club	Joined date	Ref.
First team
30 June 2026	AM	20	(Portugal) Bernardo Silva	(Spain) Real Madrid	1 July 2026	
30 June 2026	CB	5	(England) John Stones	(Italy) Inter Milan	30 July 2026	
Academy
30 June 2026	RB	53	(England) Ezra Carrington	(England) Everton	2 September 2026	
30 June 2026	LW	62	(Scotland) Ashton Muir			
5 September 2026	CB	79	(England) Luke Mbete			

=== New contracts ===
Date	Pos.	No.	Player	Contract until	Ref.
First team
22 July 2026	CAM	47	(England) Phil Foden	30 June 2030	
25 July 2026	CB	45	(Uzbekistan) Abdukodir Khusanov	30 June 2031	
28 July 2026	CB	24	(Croatia) Joško Gvardiol	30 June 2031	
13 August 2026	LW	11	(Belgium) Jérémy Doku	30 June 2031	
Academy
9 June 2026	MF	63	(England) Divine Mukasa	30 June 2030	
14 August 2026	MF	—	(England) Finlay Gorman	Undisclosed (Note: First professional contract)	
14 August 2026	RB	88	(England) Dante Headley	Undisclosed	
14 August 2026	CF	79	(England) Teddie Lamb	Undisclosed	
14 August 2026	CB	—	(England) Freddie Lawrie	Undisclosed	
14 August 2026	MF	76	(England) Dexter Oliver	Undisclosed	
14 August 2026	CM	75	(England) Floyd Samba	Undisclosed	
14 August 2026	GK	99	(England) Ben Vickery	Undisclosed	
14 August 2026	RB	93	(England) Jake Wain	Undisclosed	
14 August 2026	RW	—	(England) Timeo Whisker	Undisclosed	
16 October 2026	MF	97	(England) Tyrone Samba	30 June 2030	

== Pre-season and friendlies ==
Man City announced a pre-season tour in Asia, with friendlies against Inter Milan in Hong Kong and both K-League All Stars and Atlético Madrid in South Korea scheduled.

Win Draw Loss Fixtures

1 August 2026 Asahi Super Dry Trophy	Manchester City	1–1 (1–3 p)	Inter Milan	Kowloon, Hong Kong
12:30 BST	Mubama 14'; Khusanov (yellow card) 83'	Report	Pavard 20'; Stanković (yellow card) 56'	Stadium: Kai Tak Stadium; Attendance: 42,826; Referee: Tam Ping Wun (Hong Kong)
	Penalties
	Aït-Nouri (penalty missed); Khusanov (penalty missed); González (penalty missed); Echeverri (penalty scored)		(penalty scored) Zieliński; (penalty missed) Frattesi; (penalty scored) Mosconi; (penalty scored) Lavelli

5 August 2026 2026 coupang play series	K-League All Stars	1–3	Manchester City	Seoul, South Korea
12:00 BST	Kim Dae-won 12'	Report	Aït-Nouri 9'; Reijnders 20'; Mubama 23'	Stadium: Sangam Stadium; Attendance: 28,036

9 August 2026 2026 coupang play series	Manchester City	3–1	Atlético Madrid	Seoul, South Korea
12:00 BST	Marmoush 57', 59'; Gvardiol (yellow card) 89'; Aït-Nouri 90'	Report	Domínguez 43'; Hjulmand (yellow card) 55'	Stadium: Sangam Stadium; Attendance: 50,078; Referee: Kim Jong-hyeok (South Korea)

== Competitions ==
=== Overall record ===
Competition	First match	Last match	Starting round	Final position	Record							
Competition	First match	Last match	Starting round	Final position	Pld	W	D	L	GF	GA	GD	Win %
Premier League	23 August 2026	30 May 2027	Matchday 1		11	7	1	3	22	14	+8	63.64
FA Cup	7–11 January 2027		Third round		0	0	0	0	0	0	+0	—
EFL Cup	17 September 2026		Third round		2	1	1	0	7	2	+5	50.00
FA Community Shield	16 August 2026		Final	Runners-up	1	0	0	1	0	3	−3	0.00
UEFA Champions League	8 September 2026		League phase		4	3	0	1	12	7	+5	75.00
Total					18	11	2	5	41	26	+15	61.11

Last updated: 21 November 2026
Source: Soccerway

=== Premier League ===
==== League table ====
Pos	Team	Pld	W	D	L	GF	GA	GD	Pts	Qualification or relegation
1	Arsenal	11	9	1	1	17	7	+10	28	Qualification for the Champions League league phase
2	Brighton & Hove Albion	11	7	1	3	26	9	+17	22	Qualification for the Champions League league phase
3	Manchester City	11	7	1	3	22	14	+8	22	Qualification for the Champions League league phase
4	Bournemouth	11	5	3	3	18	14	+4	18	Qualification for the Champions League league phase
5	Liverpool	10	5	3	2	14	10	+4	18	Qualification for the Europa League league phase (Note: The winners of the 2026–27 FA Cup and the 5th-placed team both qualify for the Europa League. If the FA Cup winners finish in the top five, the 6th-placed team will qualify. If England are one of the two associations with the highest UEFA coefficient points, 5th place will qualify for the Champions League and the other qualifying spots will move down one position.)

Updated to match(es) played on 22 November 2026. Source: Premier League
Rules for classification: 1) Points; 2) Goal difference; 3) Goals scored; 4) If the champions, relegated teams or qualified teams for UEFA competitions cannot be determined by rules 1 to 3 following the completion of the competition, rules 4.1 to 4.3 are applied between such teams – 4.1) Head-to-head points; 4.2) Head-to-head away goals; 4.3) Play-off at a neutral site.

==== Results summary ====
Overall								Home						Away					
Pld	W	D	L	GF	GA	GD	Pts	W	D	L	GF	GA	GD	W	D	L	GF	GA	GD
11	7	1	3	22	14	+8	22	4	1	1	12	8	+4	3	0	2	10	6	+4

Last updated: 21 November 2026.
Source: Soccerway

==== Results by round ====
Round	1	2	3	4	5	6	7	8	9	10	11	12	13	14	15	16	17	18	19	20	21	22	23	24	25	26	27	28	29	30	31	32	33	34	35	36	37	38
Ground	H	A	H	A	H	A	H	A	H	A	H	A	H	A	H	H	A	A	H	A	H	A	H	A	A	H	A	H	A	H	A	H	A	H	H	A	H	A
Result	W	W	W	W	W	W	W	L	L	L	D																											
Position	8	1	1	2	1	1	1	1	2	3	3																											
Points	3	6	9	12	15	18	21	21	21	21	22																											

Updated to match(es) played on 21 November 2026. Source: Premier League
W = Win; D = Draw; L = Loss; T = TBC

==== Matches ====
On 19 June 2026, the Premier League fixtures were released.

Win Draw Loss Fixtures

23 August 2026 1	Manchester City	2–1	Bournemouth	Manchester
14:00 BST	Foden (yellow card) 78'; Guéhi 84'; Gvardiol 90+1'	Report	Tavernier 26'; Evanilson (yellow card) 45+1'; Silva (yellow card) 85'	Stadium: Etihad Stadium; Attendance: 60,645; Referee: Jarred Gillett

28 August 2026 2	Crystal Palace	1–4	Manchester City	Selhurst
20:00 BST	Donnarumma 56' (o.g.); Khalaili (yellow card) 68'	Report	Haaland 17', 84'; Cherki (yellow card) 33', (goal) 54', 59'; Anderson (yellow card) 55'	Stadium: Selhurst Park; Attendance: 25,149; Referee: Andrew Madley
Note: Fixture was initially scheduled for 29 August, but was rescheduled for live Sky Sports broadcasting.

5 September 2026 3	Manchester City	1–0	Coventry City	Manchester
15:00 BST	Haaland 26'; Khusanov (yellow card) 90+5'	Report	Van Ewijk (yellow card) 19'; Pinnock (yellow card) 90+2'	Stadium: Etihad Stadium; Attendance: 60,765; Referee: Paul Tierney

13 September 2026 4	Manchester United	0–1	Manchester City	Trafford
16:30 BST	Maguire (yellow card) 81'	Report	Foden (red card) 23'; Haaland 60'; Gvardiol (yellow card) 79'; Fernández (yellow card) 80'	Stadium: Old Trafford; Attendance: 74,161; Referee: Michael Oliver
Note: Fixture was initially scheduled for 12 September, but was rescheduled for live Sky Sports broadcasting.

20 September 2026 5	Manchester City	5–3	Sunderland	Manchester
14:00 BST	Fernández 9'; Cherki 29'; Semenyo 43', 57'; Haaland 81'	Report	Methalie (yellow card) 8'; Brobbey 12', 33', 59'	Stadium: Etihad Stadium; Attendance: 60,312; Referee: Robert Jones
Note: Fixture was initially scheduled for 19 September, but was pushed back a day due to Manchester City's involvement in the EFL Cup on the preceding Thursday.

11 October 2026 6	Liverpool	0–3	Manchester City	Liverpool
16:30 BST	Araújo (yellow card) 8'; Gravenberch (yellow card) 47' (yellow-red card) 62'; Van Dijk (yellow card) 90+1'	Report	O'Reilly (yellow card) 58'; Haaland 65'; Doku 68'; Cherki 78'; Bouaddi (yellow card) 86'	Stadium: Anfield; Attendance: 60,338; Referee: Chris Kavanagh
Note: Fixture was initially scheduled for 12 September, but was rescheduled for live Sky Sports broadcasting.

17 October 2026 7	Manchester City	3–2	Ipswich Town	Manchester
15:00 BST	Foden 19'; Haaland 34', 69'; Gvardiol (yellow card) 90+7'	Report	Maeda 21'; Ouattara (yellow card) 73'; Flemming 90' (pen.); Davis (yellow card) 90+12'	Stadium: Etihad Stadium; Attendance: 60,817; Referee: Farai Hallam

24 October 2026 8	Aston Villa	2–1	Manchester City	Birmingham
12:30 BST	Jackson 6', 60'; Manzambi (yellow card) 54'; Cash (yellow card) 55'; Madjo (yellow card) 83'; Buendía (yellow card) 90+5'	Report	Guéhi (yellow card) 32'; Cherki (yellow card) 38'; Haaland 52'; Anderson (yellow card) 74'; McAidoo (yellow card) 76'	Stadium: Villa Park; Attendance: 36,743; Referee: Peter Bankes
Note: Fixture was initially scheduled for 12 September, but was rescheduled for live TNT Sports broadcasting.

31 October 2026 9	Manchester City	0–1	Brighton & Hove Albion	Manchester
15:00 GMT		Report	Ayari 11'; Andrés (yellow card) 20'; De Cuyper (yellow card) 49'; Groß (yellow card) 81'	Stadium: Etihad Stadium; Attendance: 60,503; Referee: Craig Pawson

7 November 2026 10	Nottingham Forest	3–1	Manchester City	West Bridgford
17:30 GMT	Jair 6'; Delap 18', 73'; McAtee (yellow card) 64'; Ndoye (yellow card) 69'; Netz (yellow card) 90+4'; Igor Jesus (yellow card) 90+5'	Report	Cherki 52'	Stadium: City Ground; Attendance: 30,762; Referee: Sam Barrott
Note: Fixture was initially scheduled for a 15:00 kick-off, but was pushed back for live Sky Sports broadcasting.

21 November 2026 11	Manchester City	1–1	Fulham	Manchester
12:30 GMT	Anderson 57'; Donnarumma (yellow card) 76'	Report	Iwobi (yellow card) 7'; Muniz 16'; Bassey (yellow card) 22'; Charles (yellow card) 44'	Stadium: Etihad Stadium; Attendance: 60,038; Referee: Thomas Bramall
Note: Fixture was initially scheduled for a 15:00 kick-off, but was brought forward for live TNT Sports broadcasting.

29 November 2026 12	Arsenal	v	Manchester City	Holloway
16:30 GMT		Report		Stadium: Emirates Stadium
Note: Fixture was initially scheduled for 28 November, but was pushed back a day for live Sky Sports broadcasting.

2 December 2026 13	Manchester City	v	Leeds United	Manchester
19:30 GMT		Report		Stadium: Etihad Stadium
Note: Fixture was initially scheduled for a 20:00 kick-off, but was brought forward half-an-hour for live Sky Sports broadcasting.

5 December 2026 14	Brentford	v	Manchester City	Brentford
20:00 GMT		Report		Stadium: Brentford Community Stadium
Note: Fixture was initially scheduled for a 15:00 kick-off, but was pushed back for live Sky Sports broadcasting.

12 December 2026 15	Manchester City	v	Chelsea	Manchester
17:30 GMT		Report		Stadium: Etihad Stadium
Note: Fixture was initially scheduled for a 15:00 kick-off, but was pushed back for live Sky Sports broadcasting.

19 December 2026 16	Manchester City	v	Hull City	Manchester
15:00 GMT		Report		Stadium: Etihad Stadium

26 December 2026 17	Newcastle United	v	Manchester City	Newcastle upon Tyne
20:00 GMT		Report		Stadium: St James' Park
Note: Fixture was initially scheduled for a 15:00 kick-off, but was pushed back for live Sky Sports broadcasting.

29 December 2026 18	Everton	v	Manchester City	Liverpool
20:15 GMT		Report		Stadium: Hill Dickinson Stadium
Note: Fixture was initially scheduled for 30 December, but was brought forward a day for live Sky Sports broadcasting.

3 January 2027 19	Manchester City	v	Tottenham Hotspur	Manchester
16:30 GMT		Report		Stadium: Etihad Stadium
Note: Fixture was initially scheduled for 2 January, but was pushed back a day for live Sky Sports broadcasting.

6 January 2027 20	Leeds United	v	Manchester City	Leeds
20:15 GMT		Report		Stadium: Elland Road
Note: Fixture was initially scheduled for a 15:00 kick-off, but was pushed back for live Sky Sports broadcasting.

16 January 2027 21	Manchester City	v	Nottingham Forest	Manchester
15:00 GMT		Report		Stadium: Etihad Stadium

23 January 2027 22	Brighton & Hove Albion	v	Manchester City	Brighton and Hove
20:00 GMT		Report		Stadium: Falmer Stadium
Note: Fixture was initially scheduled for a 15:00 kick-off, but was pushed back for live TNT Sports broadcasting.

31 January 2027 23	Manchester City	v	Arsenal	Manchester
16:30 GMT		Report		Stadium: Etihad Stadium
Note: Fixture was initially scheduled for 30 January, but was pushed back a day for live Sky Sports broadcasting.

6 February 2027 24	Fulham	v	Manchester City	Fulham
15:00 GMT		Report		Stadium: Craven Cottage

10 February 2027 25	Tottenham Hotspur	v	Manchester City	Tottenham
15:00 GMT		Report		Stadium: Tottenham Hotspur Stadium

20 February 2027 26	Manchester City	v	Newcastle United	Manchester
15:00 GMT		Report		Stadium: Etihad Stadium

27 February 2027 27	Hull City	v	Manchester City	Kingston upon Hull
15:00 GMT		Report		Stadium: MKM Stadium

3 March 2027 28	Manchester City	v	Everton	Manchester
15:00 GMT		Report		Stadium: Etihad Stadium

13 March 2027 29	Coventry City	v	Manchester City	Coventry
15:00 GMT		Report		Stadium: Coventry Building Society Arena

20 March 2027 30	Manchester City	v	Manchester United	Manchester
15:00 GMT		Report		Stadium: Etihad Stadium

10 April 2027 31	Bournemouth	v	Manchester City	Bournemouth
15:00 BST		Report		Stadium: Dean Court

17 April 2027 32	Manchester City	v	Crystal Palace	Manchester
15:00 BST		Report		Stadium: Etihad Stadium

24 April 2027 33	Chelsea	v	Manchester City	Fulham
15:00 BST		Report		Stadium: Stamford Bridge

1 May 2027 34	Manchester City	v	Brentford	Manchester
15:00 BST		Report		Stadium: Etihad Stadium

8 May 2027 35	Manchester City	v	Liverpool	Manchester
15:00 BST		Report		Stadium: Etihad Stadium

15 May 2027 36	Ipswich Town	v	Manchester City	Ipswich
15:00 BST		Report		Stadium: Portman Road

23 May 2027 37	Manchester City	v	Aston Villa	Manchester
15:00 BST		Report		Stadium: Etihad Stadium

30 May 2027 38	Sunderland	v	Manchester City	Sunderland
16:00 BST		Report		Stadium: Stadium of Light

=== FA Cup ===
As a Premier League side, Manchester City will enter the FA Cup in the third round.

Win Draw Loss Fixtures

7–11 January 2027 Third round	TBD	v	TBD	TBD
--:-- BST				Stadium: TBD

=== EFL Cup ===
As one of the Premier League clubs participating in European competitions, Manchester City entered the EFL Cup in the third round, and were drawn at home to Norwich City. They were then drawn at home to Brighton & Hove Albion in the fourth round, and at home to Bradford City in the quarter-finals.

Win Draw Loss Fixtures

17 September 2026 Third round	Manchester City	5–0	Norwich City	Manchester
19:30 BST	Samba 29', 54'; Cherki 32'; Allan 48'; McAidoo 90'	Report	Fisher (yellow card) 30'	Stadium: Etihad Stadium; Attendance: 32,451; Referee: Ruebyn Ricardo

28 October 2026 Fourth round	Manchester City	2–2 (4–3 p)	Brighton & Hove Albion	Manchester
19:30 GMT	Bouaddi (yellow card) 32'; Kovačić 40'; Vitor Reis 72'	Report	Svoboda (yellow card) 11'; Yalcouyé 30'; Rutter 47'; Wieffer (yellow card) 90+1'; Dunk (yellow card) 90+2'	Stadium: Etihad Stadium; Attendance: 55,343; Referee: Andy Madley
	Penalties
	Foden (penalty scored); Fernández (penalty scored); Doku (penalty scored); Kovačić (penalty missed); Cherki (penalty scored)		(penalty scored) Groß; (penalty scored) O'Riley; (penalty scored) De Cuyper; (penalty missed) Ayari; (penalty missed) Dunk

15 December 2026 Quarter-finals	Manchester City	v	Bradford City	Manchester
20:00 GMT				Stadium: Etihad Stadium

=== FA Community Shield ===
As the defending FA Cup champions, Manchester City faced the reigning Premier League winners Arsenal in the traditional season opener.

16 August 2026 Final	Arsenal	3–0	Manchester City	Cardiff
15:00 BST	Calafiori 1', (yellow card) 38'; Havertz 28'; Ødegaard 48', (yellow card) 84'	Report	Foden (yellow card) 24'; Gvardiol (yellow card) 53'	Stadium: Millennium Stadium; Attendance: 58,056; Referee: Sam Barrott

=== UEFA Champions League ===
==== League phase ====
Pos	Team	Pld	W	D	L	GF	GA	GD	Pts	Qualification
5	(Spain) Barcelona	4	3	0	1	14	6	+8	9	Advance to round of 16 (seeded)
6	(England) Aston Villa	4	3	0	1	12	6	+6	9	Advance to round of 16 (seeded)
7	(England) Manchester City	4	3	0	1	12	7	+5	9	Advance to round of 16 (seeded)
8	(England) Liverpool	4	3	0	1	14	10	+4	9	Advance to round of 16 (seeded)
9	(Belgium) Club Brugge	4	3	0	1	11	7	+4	9	Advance to knockout phase play-offs (seeded)

Updated to match(es) played on 4 November 2026. Source: UEFA
Rules for classification: League phase tiebreakers

===== Results by round =====
Round	1	2	3	4	5	6	7	8
Ground	A	H	H	A	H	A	A	H
Result	W	L	W	W				
Position	8	17	10	7				
Points	3	3	6	9				

Updated to match(es) played on 4 November 2026. Source: UEFA
A = Away; H = Home; W = Win; D = Draw; L = Loss

===== Matches =====
8 September 2026 1	Porto (Portugal)	0–2	(England) Manchester City	Porto, Portugal
20:00 WEST	Rosario (yellow card) 90+3'	Report	Gvardiol (yellow card) 37'; Haaland 47', 90+1', (yellow card) 90+3'; Donnarumma (yellow card) 49'	Stadium: Estádio do Dragão; Attendance: 49,106; Referee: Szymon Marciniak (Poland)

14 October 2026 2	Manchester City (England)	2–4	(France) Paris Saint-Germain	Manchester, England
20:00 BST	Haaland 53', 75'; Semenyo (yellow card) 61'	Report	Doué 13'; Dembélé 15'; Vitinha 32'; Akliouche 63'; Zaïre-Emery (yellow card) 69'; Torres (penalty missed) 90'	Stadium: Etihad Stadium; Attendance: 60,021; Referee: Sven Jablonski (Germany)

20 October 2026 3	Manchester City (England)	5–1	(Greece) AEK Athens	Manchester, England
20:00 BST	Anderson 12'; Foden 34', 65', 76'; Cherki 57'; Gvardiol (yellow card) 59'	Report	Pilios 52'	Stadium: Etihad Stadium; Attendance: 40,042; Referee: Willy Delajod (France)

4 November 2026 4	RB Leipzig (Germany)	2–3	(England) Manchester City	Leipzig, Germany
21:00 CET	Baumgartner (yellow card) 17'; Baku (yellow card) 33', (goal) 49'; El Aynaoui (yellow card) 48'; Nusa 61'; Raum (yellow card) 77'	Report	Lukeba 37' (o.g.); Fernández 58'; Haaland 78'; Doku (yellow card) 88'; Khusanov (yellow card) 90+4'	Stadium: Red Bull Arena; Attendance: 45,228; Referee: Marco Guida (Italy)

24 November 2026 5	Manchester City (England)	v	(Italy) Napoli	Manchester, England
20:00 GMT		Report		Stadium: Etihad Stadium

8 December 2026 6	Barcelona (Spain)	v	(England) Manchester City	Barcelona, Spain
21:00 CET		Report		Stadium: Camp Nou

20 January 2027 7	Lens (France)	v	(England) Manchester City	Lens, France
21:00 CET		Report		Stadium: Stade Bollaert-Delelis

27 January 2027 8	Manchester City (England)	v	(Portugal) Sporting CP	Manchester, England
20:00 GMT		Report		Stadium: Etihad Stadium

== Statistics ==
=== Overall ===
As of match played 21 November 2026

Players with no appearances are not included on the list Appearances numbers are for appearances in competitive games only, including substitute appearances.
Red card numbers denote: numbers in parentheses represent red cards overturned for wrongful dismissal.
Source for all stats:

No.	Player	Pos.	Premier League				FA Cup				EFL Cup				FA Community Shield				UEFA Champions League				Total			
No.	Player	Pos.	👕	Goal	Yellow card	Red card	👕	Goal	Yellow card	Red card	👕	Goal	Yellow card	Red card	👕	Goal	Yellow card	Red card	👕	Goal	Yellow card	Red card	👕	Goal	Yellow card	Red card
1	(Italy) Gianluigi Donnarumma	GK	11		1										1				4		1		16		2	
3	(Portugal) Rúben Dias	DF	11												1				4				16			
5	(England) Elliot Anderson	MF	11	1	2										1				4	1			16	2	2	
6	(England) Marc Guéhi	DF	10	1	1						1				1				3				15	1	1	
7	(Senegal) Iliman Ndiaye	FW	9																3				12			
8	(Croatia) Mateo Kovačić	MF	3								2	1			1				2				8	1		
9	(Norway) Erling Haaland	FW	11	9											1				3	5	1		15	14	1	
10	(France) Rayan Cherki	MF	10	5	2						2	1			1				4	1			17	7	2	
11	(Belgium) Jérémy Doku	FW	7	1							1				1				2		1		11	1	1	
17	(Argentina) Enzo Fernández	MF	9	1	1						1								4	1			14	2	1	
21	(Algeria) Rayan Aït-Nouri	DF									2								2				4			
22	(Brazil) Vitor Reis	DF	1								2	1							1				4	1		
24	(Croatia) Joško Gvardiol	DF	11	1	2										1		1		3		2		15	1	5	
27	(Portugal) Matheus Nunes	DF	7																3				10			
28	(Argentina) Geronimo Rulli	GK									2												2			
32	(Morocco) Ayyoub Bouaddi	MF	6		1						2		1						2				10		2	
33	(England) Nico O'Reilly	MF	9		1						2				1				2				14		1	
37	(Brazil) Allan	FW	3								2	1							2				7	1		
42	(Ghana) Antoine Semenyo	FW	7	2											1				2		1		10	2	1	
45	(Uzbekistan) Abdukodir Khusanov	DF	8		1						2				1				4		1		15		2	
47	(England) Phil Foden	MF	9	1	1	1					1				1		1		3	3			14	4	2	1
56	(England) Ryan McAidoo	FW	3		1						2	1							1				6	1	1	
61	(England) Kaden Braithwaite	DF	1								1								1				3			
75	(France) Floyd Samba	MF									2	2							1				3	2		
82	(England) Rico Lewis	DF	2								2				1				1				6			
On loan	(Egypt) Omar Marmoush	FW													1								1			
On loan	(England) Jack Grealish	MF	1												1								2			
Players who featured but departed the club permanently during the season:
14	(Spain) Nico González	MF													1								1			
Own goals				0				0				0				0				1				1		
Totals				22	14	1		0	0	0		7	1	0		0	2	0		12	7	0		41	24	1

=== Goalscorers ===
As of match played 21 November 2026

Rank	No.	Pos.	Player	Premier League	FA Cup	EFL Cup	FA Community Shield	UEFA Champions League	Total
1	9	FW	(Norway) Erling Haaland	9	0	0	0	5	14
2	10	MF	(France) Rayan Cherki	5	0	1	0	1	7
3	47	MF	(England) Phil Foden	1	0	0	0	3	4
4	5	MF	(England) Elliot Anderson	1	0	0	0	1	2
4	17	MF	(Argentina) Enzo Fernández	1	0	0	0	1	2
4	75	MF	(France) Floyd Samba	0	0	2	0	0	2
4	42	FW	(Ghana) Antoine Semenyo	2	0	0	0	0	2
8	37	FW	(Brazil) Allan	0	0	1	0	0	1
8	11	FW	(Belgium) Jérémy Doku	1	0	0	0	0	1
8	24	DF	(Croatia) Joško Gvardiol	1	0	0	0	0	1
8	6	DF	(England) Marc Guéhi	1	0	0	0	0	1
8	8	MF	(Croatia) Mateo Kovačić	0	0	1	0	0	1
8	56	FW	(England) Ryan McAidoo	0	0	1	0	0	1
8	22	DF	(Brazil) Vitor Reis	0	0	1	0	0	1
Own goals				0	0	0	0	1	1
Totals				22	0	7	0	12	41

=== Assists ===
As of match played 21 November 2026

Rank	No.	Pos.	Player	Premier League	FA Cup	EFL Cup	FA Community Shield	UEFA Champions League	Total
1	47	MF	(England) Phil Foden	2	0	1	0	1	4
1	7	FW	(Senegal) Iliman Ndiaye	2	0	0	0	2	4
3	21	DF	(Algeria) Rayan Aït-Nouri	0	0	2	0	1	3
3	10	MF	(France) Rayan Cherki	2	0	1	0	0	3
3	24	DF	(Croatia) Joško Gvardiol	3	0	0	0	0	3
3	42	FW	(Ghana) Antoine Semenyo	3	0	0	0	0	3
7	5	MF	(England) Elliot Anderson	1	0	0	0	1	2
7	32	MF	(Morocco) Ayyoub Bouaddi	0	0	1	0	1	2
7	82	DF	(England) Rico Lewis	0	0	0	0	2	2
10	37	FW	(Brazil) Allan	0	0	1	0	0	1
10	11	MF	(Belgium) Jérémy Doku	1	0	0	0	0	1
10	17	MF	(Argentina) Enzo Fernández	0	0	0	0	1	1
10	6	DF	(England) Marc Guéhi	1	0	0	0	0	1
10	8	MF	(Croatia) Mateo Kovacic	1	0	0	0	0	1
10	56	FW	(England) Ryan McAidoo	0	0	0	0	1	1
10	33	MF	(England) Nico O'Reilly	0	0	1	0	0	1
Totals				16	0	7	0	10	33

=== Disciplinary record ===
As of match played 21 November 2026

Rank	No.	Pos.	Player	Premier League			FA Cup			EFL Cup			FA Community Shield			UEFA Champions League			Total		
Rank	No.	Pos.	Player	Yellow card	(yellow card) (yellow-red card)	Red card	Yellow card	(yellow card) (yellow-red card)	Red card	Yellow card	(yellow card) (yellow-red card)	Red card	Yellow card	(yellow card) (yellow-red card)	Red card	Yellow card	(yellow card) (yellow-red card)	Red card	Yellow card	(yellow card) (yellow-red card)	Red card
1	47	MF	(England) Phil Foden	1	0	1	0	0	0	0	0	0	1	0	0	0	0	0	2	0	1
2	24	DF	(Croatia) Joško Gvardiol	2	0	0	0	0	0	0	0	0	1	0	0	2	0	0	5	0	0
3	5	MF	(England) Elliot Anderson	2	0	0	0	0	0	0	0	0	0	0	0	0	0	0	2	0	0
3	32	MF	(Morocco) Ayyoub Bouaddi	1	0	0	0	0	0	1	0	0	0	0	0	0	0	0	2	0	0
3	10	MF	(France) Rayan Cherki	2	0	0	0	0	0	0	0	0	0	0	0	0	0	0	2	0	0
3	1	GK	(Italy) Gianluigi Donnarumma	1	0	0	0	0	0	0	0	0	0	0	0	1	0	0	2	0	0
3	45	DF	(Uzbekistan) Abdukodir Khusanov	1	0	0	0	0	0	0	0	0	0	0	0	1	0	0	2	0	0
8	11	MF	(Belgium) Jérémy Doku	0	0	0	0	0	0	0	0	0	0	0	0	1	0	0	1	0	0
8	6	DF	(England) Marc Guéhi	1	0	0	0	0	0	0	0	0	0	0	0	0	0	0	1	0	0
8	17	MF	(Argentina) Enzo Fernández	1	0	0	0	0	0	0	0	0	0	0	0	0	0	0	1	0	0
8	9	FW	(Norway) Erling Haaland	0	0	0	0	0	0	0	0	0	0	0	0	1	0	0	1	0	0
8	56	MF	(England) Ryan McAidoo	1	0	0	0	0	0	0	0	0	0	0	0	0	0	0	1	0	0
8	33	MF	(England) Nico O'Reilly	1	0	0	0	0	0	0	0	0	0	0	0	0	0	0	1	0	0
8	42	FW	(Ghana) Antoine Semenyo	0	0	0	0	0	0	0	0	0	0	0	0	1	0	0	1	0	0
Total				14	0	1	0	0	0	1	0	0	2	0	0	7	0	0	24	0	1

=== Hat-tricks ===
As of match played 21 November 2026

Player	Against	Result	Date	Competition	Ref.
(England) Phil Foden	(Greece) AEK Athens	5–1	20 October 2026	UEFA Champions League	

=== Clean sheets ===
As of match played 21 November 2026

Rank	No.	Nat.	Player	Matches played	Goals against	Clean sheets						
Rank	No.	Nat.	Player	Matches played	Goals against	Premier League	FA Cup	EFL Cup	FA Community Shield	Champions League	Total	Clean sheet %
1	1	(Italy)	Gianluigi Donnarumma	16	24	3	0	0	0	1	4	25%
2	28	(Argentina)	Geronimo Rulli	2	2	0	0	1	0	0	1	50%
Totals				18	26	3	0	1	0	1	5	27.8%

== Awards ==
=== Player awards ===
==== Premier League Player of the Month ====
Month	Pos.	Player	Pld	G	A	CS	S	Result	Ref.
August	MF	(France) Rayan Cherki	2	2	2	—	—	Nominated	
September	FW	(Ghana) Antoine Semenyo	3	2	2	—	—	Nominated	

==== Premier League Goal of the Month ====
Month	Pos.	Player	Opposition	Result	Ref.
August	MF	(France) Rayan Cherki	v. Crystal Palace	Nominated	
October	FW	(Belgium) Jérémy Doku	v. Liverpool	Nominated	
October	MF	(France) Rayan Cherki	v. Liverpool	Nominated	

==== Premier League Save of the Month ====
Month	Player	Opposition	Result	Ref.
September	(Italy) Gianluigi Donnarumma	v. Manchester United	Nominated	

==== PFA Player of the Month ====
Month	Player	Result	Ref.
October	(Norway) Erling Haaland	Nominated	

==== Etihad Player of the Month ====
Month	Player	Ref.
August	(France) Rayan Cherki	
September	(Norway) Erling Haaland	
October	(England) Elliot Anderson	

=== Manager awards ===
==== Premier League Manager of the Month ====
Month	Manager	M	W	D	L	GF	GA	GD	Pts	Result	Ref.
August	(Italy) Enzo Maresca	2	2	0	0	6	2	+4	6	Nominated	
September	(Italy) Enzo Maresca	3	3	0	0	7	3	+4	9	Nominated	
