= Moulins Yzeure Foot =

Football club based in Yzeure, France

Moulins Yzeure
- Full name: Moulins Yzeure Football 03 Auvergne
- Short name: MYF
- Founded: 1938 (as AS Yzeure); 2016 (as Moulins Yzeure Foot)
- Ground: Stade de Bellevue
- Capacity: 2,164
- Chairman: Dominique Ray
- Manager: Stéphane Dief
- League: National 3 Group J
- 2022–23: National 2 Group D, 15th (relegated)
- Website: https://www.moulinsyzeurefoot.com
Home colours	Away colours

Former logo.

Moulins Yzeure Football 03 Auvergne, known as Moulins Yzeure Foot or just Moulins Yzeure, is a football club based in Yzeure, France. As of the 2021–22 season, it competes in the Championnat National 3, the fifth tier of the French football league system.

== History ==
AS Yzeure was founded in 1938.

On 4 January 2014, the club beat Lorient of Ligue 1 1–0 in the round of 64 of the Coupe de France.

In June 2016, following the bankruptcy of AS Moulins, an agreement was reached between the leaders of AS Yzeure and the leaders of the towns of Moulins and Yzeure to merge the clubs to create Moulins Yzeure Foot 03. The same year, AS Moulins was refounded.

== Current squad ==
As of 6 March 2021

Note: Flags indicate national team as defined under FIFA eligibility rules; some limited exceptions apply. Players may hold more than one non-FIFA nationality.

No.	Pos.	Nation	Player
1	GK	FRA	Jean-Christophe Colard
3	DF	FRA	Hugo Saminadrin
4	DF	FRA	Jonathan Bertho
5	DF	FRA	Anthony Civet
6	MF	FRA	Francis Sudre
7	FW	FRA	Gabin Diot
8	DF	FRA	Cyril Guillou
9	FW	FRA	Antoine Hanus
10	MF	FRA	Samy Alouache
11	MF	FRA	Jordan Millot

No.	Pos.	Nation	Player
18	MF	FRA	Cantyn Chastang
19	DF	FRA	Julien Kouadio
20	FW	FRA	Mourad Alouache
21	MF	FRA	Adrien Brun
22	MF	FRA	Quentin Deniaud
23	FW	FRA	Benjamin Margottat
25	DF	FRA	Loody Bellamy
26	DF	FRA	Nathan Vitré
29	MF	FRA	Noham Daraa
40	GK	FRA	Nicolas Morette

== Notable players ==
- (France) Yanis Massolin
