= Berke Özer =

Turkish footballer

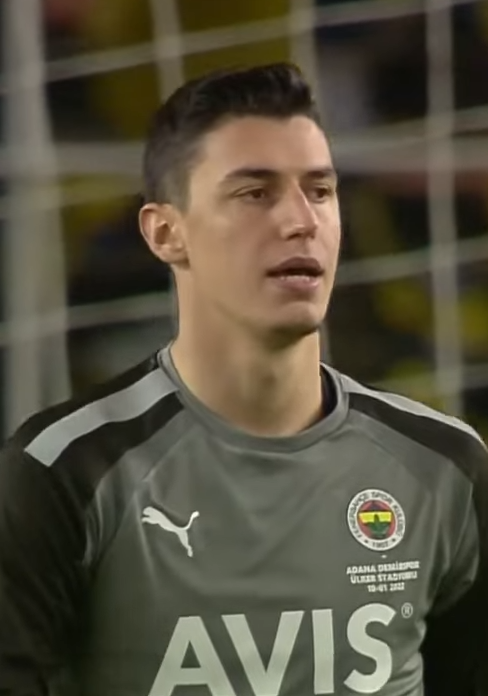
- Özer in 2022

Personal information
- Full name: Berke Özer
- Date of birth: 25 May 2000 (age 26)
- Place of birth: Konak, İzmir, Turkey
- Height: 1.91 m (6 ft 3 in)
- Position: Goalkeeper

Team information
- Current team: Lille
- Number: 1

Youth career
- 2011–2013: Bucaspor
- 2013–2016: Altınordu

Senior career*
Years	Team	Apps	(Gls)
2016–2018	Altınordu	7	(0)
2018–2022	Fenerbahçe	14	(0)
2019–2021	→ Westerlo (loan)	45	(0)
2022–2023	Portimonense	0	(0)
2023–2025	Eyüpspor	63	(0)
2023	→ Ümraniyespor (loan)	5	(0)
2025–	Lille	40	(0)

International career^{‡}
2015	Turkey U15	2	(0)
2015–2016	Turkey U16	5	(0)
2016–2017	Turkey U17	19	(0)
2018	Turkey U18	2	(0)
2018–2019	Turkey U19	7	(0)
2021	Turkey U21	1	(0)
2025–	Turkey	3	(0)
- * Club domestic league appearances and goals as of 23:03, 30 October 2026 (UTC) ‡ National team caps and goals as of 16 November 2026 (UTC)

Berke Özer (born 25 May 2000) is a Turkish professional footballer who plays as a goalkeeper for Ligue 1 club Lille and the Turkey national team.

== Club career ==
Fenerbahçe signed in Berke Özer along with his team-mate Barış Alıcı from Altınordu, on 10 July 2018, with an altogether €4 million transfer fee. Özer was excluded from 23-player-squad submitted for group stage of 2018–19 UEFA Europa League Group D fixtures. On 6 December 2018, Özer made his debut for Fenerbahçe against Giresunspor in 1st leg encounter of 5th round at 2018–19 Turkish Cup where he earned a clean sheet, following the final score of 1–0.

On 20 July 2019, Özer joined Belgian First Division B outfit Westerlo on loan for 2019–20 season. On 3 August 2019, he made his debut against Lommel SK on Belgian First Division B encounter which ended 2–0 in favour of Westerlo. On 14 August 2019, he was selected at Team of the Week following home game against Oud-Heverlee Leuven, ending 1–0 for Westerlo's favour at week 2. Following two back-to-back clean sheets, he conceded for his first time in league at week 3 home game up against K.S.V. Roeselare that ended 4–1 in favour of Westerlo on 17 August 2019.

Özer made his Süper Lig debut with Fenerbahçe in a 2–1 away defeat to Konyaspor on 30 October 2021, entering as a substitute in the 72nd minute after Altay Bayındır's shoulder injury.

On 17 January 2023, Özer signed a 2.5-year contract with Eyüpspor. On the same day, he joined Ümraniyespor on loan for the rest of the 2022–23 season.

On 14 August 2025, Özer joined Lille in France on a four-season deal.

== International career ==
In 2017 June, Özer was called up to Turkey national team by then-coach Fatih Terim for the friendly game to be held against Macedonia.

On 14 March 2025, Özer was called up by Vincenzo Montella to the Turkey national team for the 2024–25 UEFA Nations League promotion/relegation play-offs against Hungary.

He made his senior Turkey national team debut on 7 June 2025 in a friendly game against United States national team

== Career statistics ==
=== Club ===
As of 3 November 2026

Appearances and goals by club, season and competition
Club	Season	League			Cup^{1}		Continental^{2}		Other^{3}		Total	
Club	Season	Division	Apps	Goals	Apps	Goals	Apps	Goals	Apps	Goals	Apps	Goals
Altınordu	2016–17	TFF First League	2	0	0	0	—		—		2	0
Altınordu	2017–18	TFF First League	5	0	1	0	—		—		6	0
Altınordu	Total		7	0	1	0	—		—		8	0
Fenerbahçe	2018–19	Süper Lig	0	0	1	0	0	0	—		1	0
Fenerbahçe	2021–22	Süper Lig	14	0	2	0	3 (Note: Appearances in UEFA Europa League)	0	0	0	19	0
Fenerbahçe	Total		14	0	3	0	3	0	0	0	20	0
Westerlo (loan)	2019–20	Challenger Pro League	22	0	0	0	—		—		22	0
Westerlo (loan)	2020–21	Challenger Pro League	23	0	1	0	—		—		24	0
Westerlo (loan)	Total		45	0	1	0	—		—		46	0
Portimonense	2022–23	Primeira Liga	0	0	0	0	—		0	0	0	0
Eyüpspor	2022–23	TFF First League	0	0	0	0	—		—		0	0
Eyüpspor	2023–24	TFF First League	28	0	1	0	—		—		29	0
Eyüpspor	2024–25	Süper Lig	34	0	1	0	—		—		35	0
Eyüpspor	2025–26	Süper Lig	1	0	—		—		—		1	0
Eyüpspor	Total		64	0	2	0	—		—		65	0
Ümraniyespor (loan)	2022–23	Süper Lig	5	0	—		—		—		5	0
Lille	2025–26	Ligue 1	32	0	0	0	12	0	—		44	0
Lille	2026–27	Ligue 1	8	0	0	0	4 (Note: Appearances in UEFA Champions League)	0	—		12	0
Lille	Total		40	0	0	0	16	0	—		56	0
Career total			174	0	7	0	19	0	0	0	199	0

- 1.Includes Turkish Cup and Belgian Cup
- 2.Includes UEFA Champions League and UEFA Europa League.
- 3.Includes Turkish Super Cup.

=== International ===
As of match played 11 June 2025

Appearances and goals by national team and year
National team	Year	Apps	Goals
Turkey
Turkey	2025	2	0
Turkey	2026	1	0
Total		3	0
