= Matias Fernandez-Pardo =

Belgian footballer (born 2005)

- Fernandez-Pardo with Belgium in 2026

Personal information
- Date of birth: 3 February 2005 (age 21)
- Place of birth: Brussels, Belgium
- Height: 1.88 m (6 ft 2 in)
- Positions: Attacking midfielder; wide midfielder; forward

Team information
- Current team: Newcastle United
- Number: 20

Youth career
- 2011-2013: Anderlecht
- 2013-2014: Mechelen
- 2014–2020: Lille
- 2020–2022: Gent

Senior career*
Years	Team	Apps	(Gls)
2022–2024	Gent II	38	(4)
2023–2024	Gent	20	(9)
2024–2026	Lille	51	(12)
2026–	Newcastle United	4	(0)

International career^{‡}
2020	Belgium U15	1	(0)
2021	Belgium U17	1	(0)
2023	Belgium U18	3	(0)
2023–2024	Belgium U19	10	(3)
2026–	Belgium	7	(0)
- * Club domestic league appearances and goals as of 19:32, 5 September 2026 (UTC) ‡ National team caps and goals as of 21:21, 28 September 2026 (UTC)

Matias Fernandez-Pardo (born 3 February 2005) is a Belgian professional footballer who plays as an attacking midfielder or winger for Premier League club Newcastle United and the Belgium national team.

A former Lille youth talent across six years, Fernandez-Pardo moved back to Belgium and transitioned into Gent's youth system at the age of 15, before making his debut with the first team in March 2023 at the age of 18. The following year, he returned to Lille and signed a five-year contract with the club until 2029, scoring his first goal for the club in November.

Born in Belgium and a former youth international for the country across various ranks, Fernandez-Pardo switched allegiances to Spain in February 2025, but was sporadically selected to participate in Spain's under-21 and under-20 training camps, and was ultimately never chosen to play in any of their games. He then switched his nationality back to Belgium in May 2026, and was subsequently included in the Belgium squad for the 2026 FIFA World Cup.

== Early life ==
Matias Fernandez-Pardo was born on 3 February 2005 in Brussels, Belgium within a family of Spanish and Italian descent. He started playing football at Anderlecht and Mechelen, and then joined French Ligue 1 club Lille academy in 2014. He stayed in Northern France until 2020 when he chose to come back in Belgium and join Gent youth system.

== Club career ==
=== Gent ===
During the 2022–23 season, he was selected for Jong KAA Gent, the promising team of Gent, where he managed to score two goals in 26 appearances. On 9 March 2023, he made his official debut with Gent's first team: in a Conference League match against Istanbul Başakşehir (1–1 draw), coach Hein Vanhaezebrouck brought him on as a substitute for Hugo Cuypers in the 85th minute. On 1 April 2023, he joined the first team in his first league appearance against Seraing in a match that ended 5–0 for Gent. His first professional goal came in a 5–0 win against Charleroi.

Fernandez-Pardo signed a contract extension with Gent in June 2023 until mid-2026. In the 2024 winter transfer window, he was linked with a move to Lecce or Real Valladolid. After Gent managed to secure a ticket to the Conference League, it was reported that Bayer Leverkusen was interested in recruiting him. During the 2023–24 Belgian Pro League play-offs, he played in each of the 10 matches and scored 7 goals, as well as providing two assists.

=== Lille ===
On 30 August 2024, Fernandez-Pardo officially returned to French Ligue 1 club Lille, signing a five-year contract for the club he left as an academy player four years ago. According to various columnists and reporters, the financial details of the transfer include an initial and base fee of €10 million and a maximum of €2 million add-ons depending on sporting conditions. On 10 November, he scored his first Ligue 1 goal in a 2–2 draw at Nice after a rush on the left wing. On 6 January 2025, Lille revealed that Fernandez-Pardo had suffered a torn ligament in his left ankle in a 1–1 draw against Nantes two days prior.

=== Newcastle United ===
On 1 September 2026, Premier League club Newcastle United confirmed the signing of Fernandez-Pardo on a long-term contract for a reported fee of €60 million plus add-ons.

== International career ==
Born in Belgium, Fernandez-Pardo was eligible to represent Spain, Italy, or Belgium. In November 2023, he was called up by the Belgium under-19 team for the 2024 UEFA Euro Under-19 qualifying matches, and scored the winning brace against Albania.

On 26 February 2025, Fernandez-Pardo's request to switch allegiance to Spain was approved by FIFA. On 14 March, he was called up by the Spain national under-21 team. In August 2025, he was called up to the Spain national under-20 team for a training in camp in France ahead of the 2025 FIFA U-20 World Cup, but he withdrew from the squad before the beginning of camp. He ultimately never represented Spain at any level.

On 14 May 2026, Fernandez-Pardo's request to switch international allegiance back to Belgium was approved by FIFA. A day later, he was called up to the 26-man squad for the 2026 FIFA World Cup by manager Rudi Garcia. On 2 June, he made his senior debut for Belgium in a 2–0 pre-World Cup friendly win over Croatia. On 15 June, he made his World Cup debut when he came on in the 86th minute for Jeremy Doku in the opening group stage match in an eventual 1–1 draw against Egypt.

== Personal life ==
Besides Belgium, Fernandez-Pardo also possesses Spanish citizenship, as his full name in his nationality switch document is displayed as Matías Fernández Picogna. (Note: In this Spanish name, the first or paternal surname is Fernández and the second or maternal family name is Picogna.)

== Career statistics ==
=== Club ===
As of match played 8 September 2026

Appearances and goals by club, season and competition
Club	Season	League			National cup (Note: Includes Coupe de France, FA Cup)		League cup (Note: Includes EFL Cup)		Europe		Other		Total	
Club	Season	Division	Apps	Goals	Apps	Goals	Apps	Goals	Apps	Goals	Apps	Goals	Apps	Goals
Gent II	2022–23	Belgian National Division 1	26	2	—		—		—		—		26	2
Gent II	2023–24	Belgian National Division 1	12	2	—		—		—		—		12	2
Gent II	Total		38	4	—		—		—		—		38	4
Gent	2022–23	Belgian Pro League	1	0	0	0	—		1 (Note: Appearance(s) in UEFA (Europa) Conference League)	0	—		2	0
Gent	2023–24	Belgian Pro League	16	8	0	0	—		3	0	—		19	8
Gent	2024–25	Belgian Pro League	3	1	—		—		4	1	—		7	2
Gent	Total		20	9	0	0	—		8	1	—		28	10
Lille	2024–25	Ligue 1	22	4	1	0	—		7 (Note: Appearances in UEFA Champions League)	0	—		30	4
Lille	2025–26	Ligue 1	29	8	1	0	—		11 (Note: Appearances in UEFA Europa League)	0	—		41	8
Lille	Total		51	12	2	0	—		18	0	—		71	12
Newcastle United	2026–27	Premier League	4	0	0	0	1	0	—		—		5	0
Career total			110	25	2	0	1	0	26	1	0	0	139	25

=== International ===
As of match played 28 September 2026

Appearances and goals by national team and year
National team	Year	Apps	Goals
Belgium	2026	7	0
Total		7	0

== Honours ==
Individual

- Ligue 1 Young Player of the Month: November 2024
