= Spike Brits =

English footballer (born 2007)

Personal information
- Full name: Thorsten Spike Brits
- Date of birth: 24 June 2007 (age 19)
- Place of birth: Kingston upon Thames, England
- Height: 1.90 m (6 ft 3 in)
- Position: Goalkeeper

Team information
- Current team: Sutton United (on loan from Manchester City)
- Number: 1

Youth career
- 2013–2023: AFC Wimbledon
- 2023–2026: Manchester City

Senior career*
Years	Team	Apps	(Gls)
2026–	Manchester City	0	(0)
2026–	→ Sutton United (loan)	6	(0)

International career^{‡}
2022–2023	England U16	8	(0)
2023–	England U17	10	(0)
2024–	England U18	1	(0)
- * Club domestic league appearances and goals as of 22:56, 5 September 2026 (UTC) ‡ National team caps and goals as of 11:16, 10 September 2024 (UTC)

Thorsten Spike Brits (born 24 June 2007) is an English footballer who plays as a goalkeeper for National League club Sutton United, on loan from Manchester City, and England at youth level.

== Early life ==
Born in England, Brits attended independent fee paying school, Ewell Castle School in Epsom, Surrey.

== Career ==
=== Wimbledon ===
Brits joined AFC Wimbledon in the under-9s age group. After progressing through the Wimbledon academy and impressing at under-18s during the 2022–23 season it was reported that he had begun training with the Wimbledon first team squad. His performances began to attract interest from Premier League clubs, with the front runners being Manchester City, Brighton, and Brentford.

=== Manchester City ===
In June 2023, Wimbledon confirmed the transfer of Brits to Manchester City for a club record fee received for an academy player.

=== Sutton United (loan) ===
On 21 July 2026, it was confirmed that Brits would spend the 2026–27 season on loan at Sutton United. He made his debut for the club in a 3–0 away win over Woking in the National League.

== International career ==
Brits made his debut for the England U16s against Belgium U16s on 24 November 2022. He kept seven clean sheets from his first eight caps and played as England U16s won the Mondial Montaigu Tournament, defeating Japan U16s in the final.

On 6 September 2023, Brits made his England U17 debut during a 3–2 defeat to Portugal at the Pinatar Arena. On 20 May 2024 he was included in the England squad for the 2024 UEFA European Under-17 Championship. His two appearances during the tournament both came in the group stage including a clean sheet in their opening game against France.

On 6 September 2024, Brits made his England U18 debut during a 1–1 draw with Switzerland at the Lafarge Foot Avenir.

== Personal life ==
He was born in England to South African parents, making him eligible for the national teams of both countries. He currently plays youth international football for England.

== Career statistics ==
=== Club ===
As of match played 15 August 2026

Appearances and goals by club, season and competition
Club	Season	League			National cup (Note: Includes FA Cup)		League cup (Note: Includes EFL Cup)		Europe		Other		Total	
Club	Season	Division	Apps	Goals	Apps	Goals	Apps	Goals	Apps	Goals	Apps	Goals	Apps	Goals
Manchester City U21	2025–26	—			—		—		—		2 (Note: Appearances in EFL Trophy)	0	2	0
Manchester City	2026–27	Premier League	0	0	0	0	0	0	0	0	0	0	0	0
Sutton United (loan)	2026–27	National League	2	0	0	0	—		—		0	0	2	0
Career total			2	0	0	0	0	0	0	0	2	0	4	0
