= Benjamin André =

French footballer (born 1990)

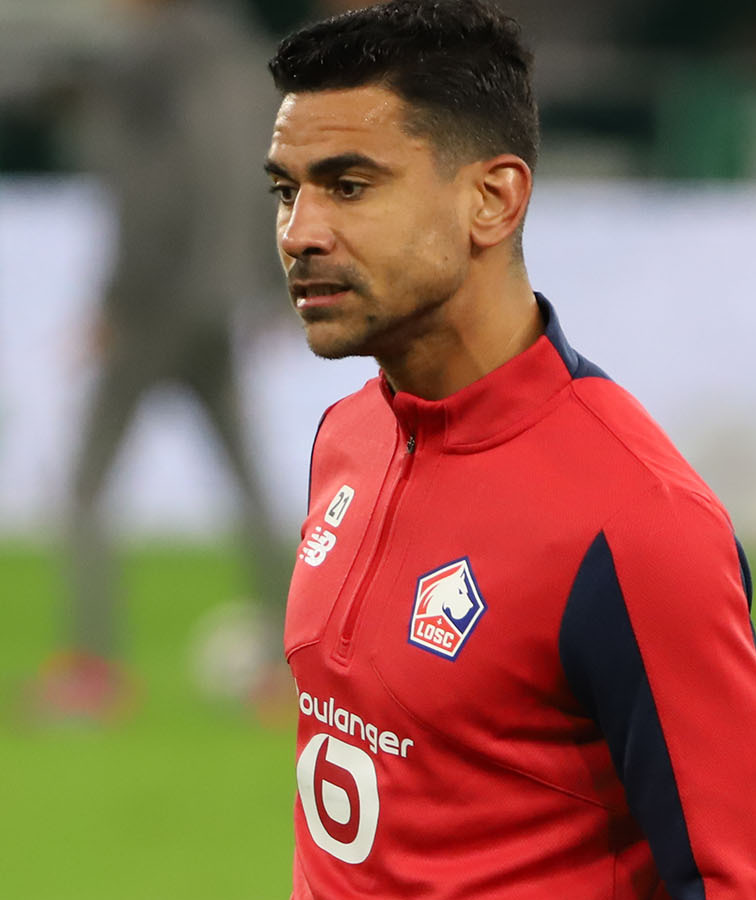
- André with Lille in 2024

Personal information
- Full name: Benjamin Michel Édouard André
- Date of birth: 3 August 1990 (age 36)
- Place of birth: Nice, France
- Height: 1.80 m (5 ft 11 in)
- Positions: Central midfielder; defensive midfielder

Team information
- Current team: Lille
- Number: 21

Youth career
- 1996–2006: Stade Raphaëlois
- 2006–2008: Ajaccio

Senior career*
Years	Team	Apps	(Gls)
2008–2014	Ajaccio	187	(12)
2014–2019	Rennes	154	(7)
2019–	Lille	222	(11)

International career
2010–2011	France U21	7	(0)
- * Club domestic league appearances and goals as of 30 October 2026

Benjamin Michel Édouard André (born 3 August 1990) is a French professional footballer who plays for and captains Ligue 1 club Lille. He plays as either a central or defensive midfielder.

== Club career ==
=== Ajaccio ===
André was with the Corsica-based club Ajaccio since he was 16 years old, joining the club as an academy player after arriving from his hometown of Nice in Provence-Alpes-Côte d'Azur. After gaining notice playing on the club's under-18 side, he was promoted to the senior squad for the 2008–09 season, despite being only 17 years old at the time of the promotion. André appeared sparingly early on in the season making his debut on 22 August 2008 against Sedan appearing as a substitute in a 1–1 draw. He earned his first start in a Coupe de France match on 22 November 2008 against amateur side Bagnols Pont playing 120 minutes. The match went into a penalty shootout with the young André converting Ajaccio's final shootout goal ensuring the club's advancement to the next round.

Five days later, he made his first league start in a 2–0 defeat to Boulogne. Throughout the season, his starts increased and, despite Ajaccio's inconsistent play, became an instant revelation helping the club reach the Round of 16 of the Coupe de France. He scored his first career goal of the season on the final match day of the season against Châteauroux in a 2–1 loss. His best season with Ajaccio was the 2013–14 Ligue 1 season. Although Ajaccio were relegated, he provided four goals and five assists across all competitions.

=== Rennes ===
In the summer transfer market of 2014, André signed with Rennes after six years at Ajaccio. On 25 January 2015, he scored his first goal for Stade Rennais in a 4–1 loss against Caen.

On 27 April 2019, he won the 2018–19 Coupe de France as Rennes beat league champions Paris Saint-Germain in the final, playing the full 120 minutes and lifting the trophy as the team captain.

=== Lille ===
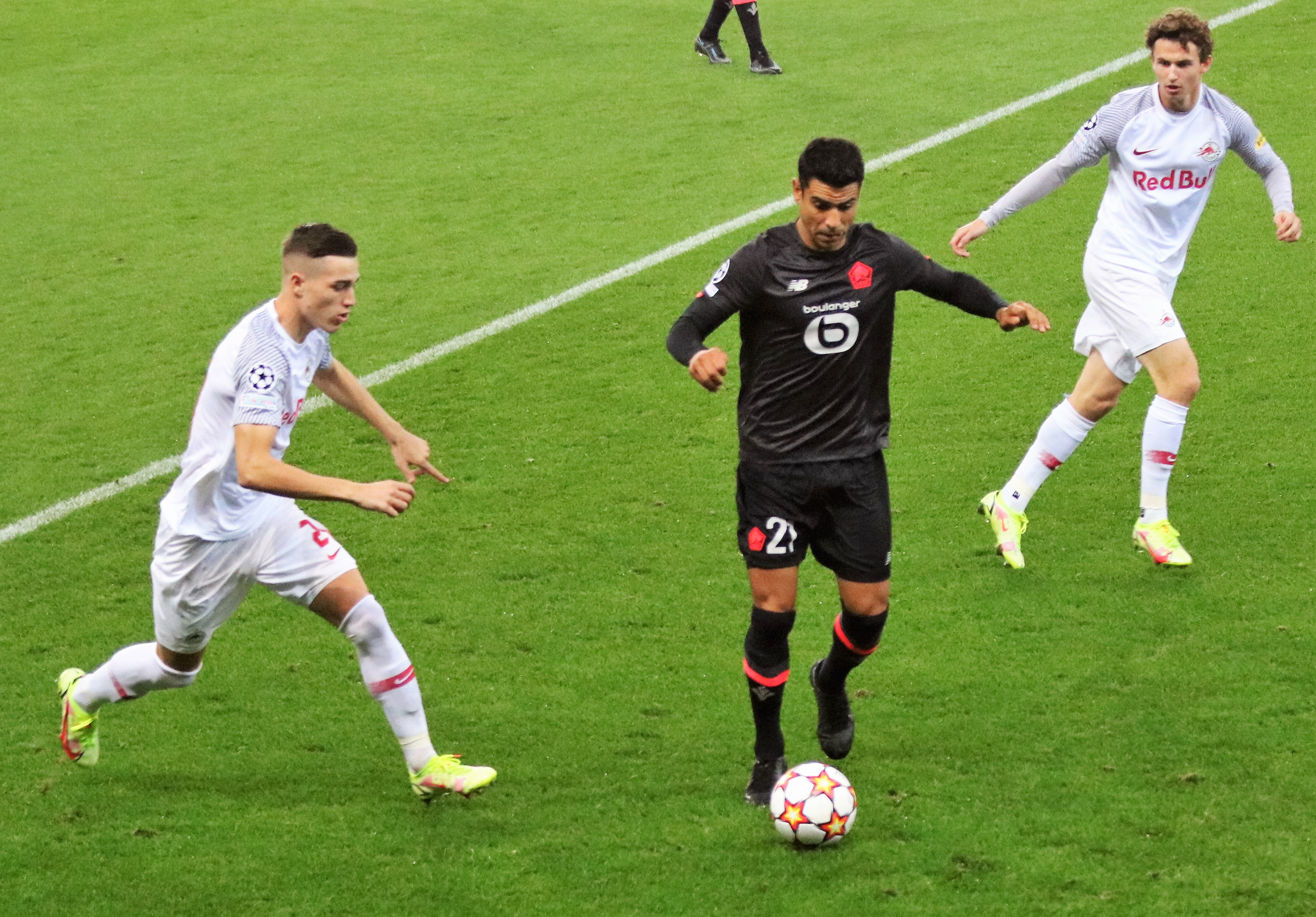
André against Salzburg in 2021

On 17 July 2019, André signed a four-year deal with Lille, for a reported €8 million transfer fee. For his first season with Lille, he played his first UEFA Champions League games.

André quickly became an important player for Lille. He showed himself as a consistent performer and their midfield linchpin, as they won their fourth league title during the 2020–21 season, playing 35 league games and emerging as the team vice-captain. Therefore, he was named in the UNFP Team of the Year.

During the 2021–22 Lille OSC season, he participated in the 1–0 win against PSG in the Trophée des Champions, with the club winning that trophy for the first time ever. Later, he helped the team to get out of the 2021–22 UEFA Champions League group stage and played against Chelsea in round of 16.

On 7 August 2022, André started off the new season under new head coach Paulo Fonseca by scoring Lille's first goal in a 4–1 victory over Auxerre on the league opening weekend, 36 seconds after kick-off. On 12 January 2023, he extended his contract with Lille until 2026. At the end of the season, he became the team's captain after José Fonte's departure.

On 2 March 2024, he played his 400th Ligue 1 game in a 0–1 away win against Reims.

== Personal life ==
André was born in France to a Senegalese mother and a French father.

== Career statistics ==
As of match played 3 November 2026

Appearances and goals by club, season and competition
Club	Season	League			Coupe de France		Coupe de la Ligue		Europe		Other		Total	
Club	Season	Division	Apps	Goals	Apps	Goals	Apps	Goals	Apps	Goals	Apps	Goals	Apps	Goals
Ajaccio	2008–09	Ligue 2	26	1	4	0	1	0	—		—		31	1
Ajaccio	2009–10	Ligue 2	33	2	2	0	2	0	—		—		37	2
Ajaccio	2010–11	Ligue 2	32	1	2	0	3	0	—		—		37	1
Ajaccio	2011–12	Ligue 1	33	4	1	0	0	0	—		—		34	4
Ajaccio	2012–13	Ligue 1	27	0	1	0	1	0	—		—		29	0
Ajaccio	2013–14	Ligue 1	36	4	1	0	1	0	—		—		38	4
Ajaccio	Total		187	12	11	0	8	0	—		—		206	12
Rennes	2014–15	Ligue 1	22	1	2	0	3	0	—		—		27	1
Rennes	2015–16	Ligue 1	32	0	1	1	1	0	—		—		34	1
Rennes	2016–17	Ligue 1	36	0	2	0	0	0	—		—		38	0
Rennes	2017–18	Ligue 1	34	3	1	0	4	1	—		—		39	4
Rennes	2018–19	Ligue 1	30	3	6	1	2	0	8 (Note: Appearances in UEFA Europa League)	0	—		46	4
Rennes	Total		154	7	12	2	10	1	8	0	—		184	10
Lille	2019–20	Ligue 1	26	2	2	0	3	0	5 (Note: Appearances in UEFA Champions League)	0	—		36	2
Lille	2020–21	Ligue 1	35	0	3	0	—		5	0	—		43	0
Lille	2021–22	Ligue 1	33	2	1	0	—		7	0	1 (Note: Appearance in Trophée des Champions)	0	42	2
Lille	2022–23	Ligue 1	34	1	3	0	—		—		—		37	1
Lille	2023–24	Ligue 1	30	4	3	0	—		12 (Note: Appearances in UEFA Europa Conference League)	1	—		45	5
Lille	2024–25	Ligue 1	30	0	2	0	—		13	0	—		45	0
Lille	2025–26	Ligue 1	27	2	2	0	—		8	2	—		37	4
Lille	2026–27	Ligue 1	7	0	0	0	—		4	0	—		11	0
Lille	Total		222	11	16	0	3	0	54	3	1	0	296	14
Career total			562	30	39	2	21	1	62	3	1	0	685	36

== Honours ==
Rennes

- Coupe de France: 2018–19

Lille

- Ligue 1: 2020–21
- Trophée des Champions: 2021

Individual

- UNFP Ligue 1 Team of the Year: 2020–21
