= ÉFC Fréjus Saint-Raphaël =

French football club, based in Fréjus

Fréjus Saint-Raphaël
- Full name: Étoile Football Club Fréjus Saint-Raphaël
- Nickname: the blue saints
- Founded: 2 June 2009; 17 years ago
- Ground: Stade Louis Hon, Fréjus
- Capacity: 30,000
- Manager: Charles Paquillé
- League: Championnat National 1 Group C
- 2025-26: Championnat National 1 11th of 16
- Website: www.etoilefc.fr
Home colours	Away colours

Étoile Football Club Fréjus Saint-Raphaël (Occitan: Frejús Sant Rafèu; commonly referred to as Fréjus Saint-Raphaël) is a French association football club based in the neighboring communes of Fréjus and Saint-Raphaël. The club was formed in 2009 as a result of a merger between ES Fréjus and Stade Raphaëlois and as of the 2026–27 season play in the Championnat National 1, the fourth level of French football. Fréjus Saint-Raphaël plays its home matches at the Stade Louis Hon in Fréjus.

== Players ==
=== Current squad ===
As of 10 April, 2026

Note: Flags indicate national team as defined under FIFA eligibility rules; some limited exceptions apply. Players may hold more than one non-FIFA nationality.

No.	Pos.	Nation	Player
1	GK	FRA	Thomas Navaux
4	MF	FRA	Cantyn Chastang
5	MF	FRA	Mohamed Fadhloun
6	MF	FRA	Christian Gyeboaho
7	FW	FRA	Ilyasse Maamar Ben Hadjar
8	FW	FRA	Mickaël Le Bihan
9	FW	ALG	Oussama Abdeldjelil
10	MF	FRA	Naël Jaby
11	MF	FRA	Léo Fichten
13	FW	GUI	Fodé Guirassy
14	FW	FRA	Selmane El Hamri
15	DF	GUI	Yasser Baldé

No.	Pos.	Nation	Player
16	GK	FRA	Vicenzo Bezzina
17	DF	FRA	Karl de Souza
18	DF	MAD	Ehsan Kari
19	DF	SMN	Belony Dumas
20	DF	FRA	Julien Mouillon
22	FW	FRA	Yanis El Khemiri
24	MF	FRA	Georges Garnero
26	DF	FRA	Alexandre Gameiro
27	MF	FRA	Mansour Belarbi
28	DF	FRA	Wilcem Alouache
29	MF	HAI	Brian Chevreuil

=== Notable players ===
For notable former Fréjus Saint-Raphaël players, see Category:ÉFC Fréjus Saint-Raphaël players.

- (France) Koba Koindredi (youth)

== Honours ==
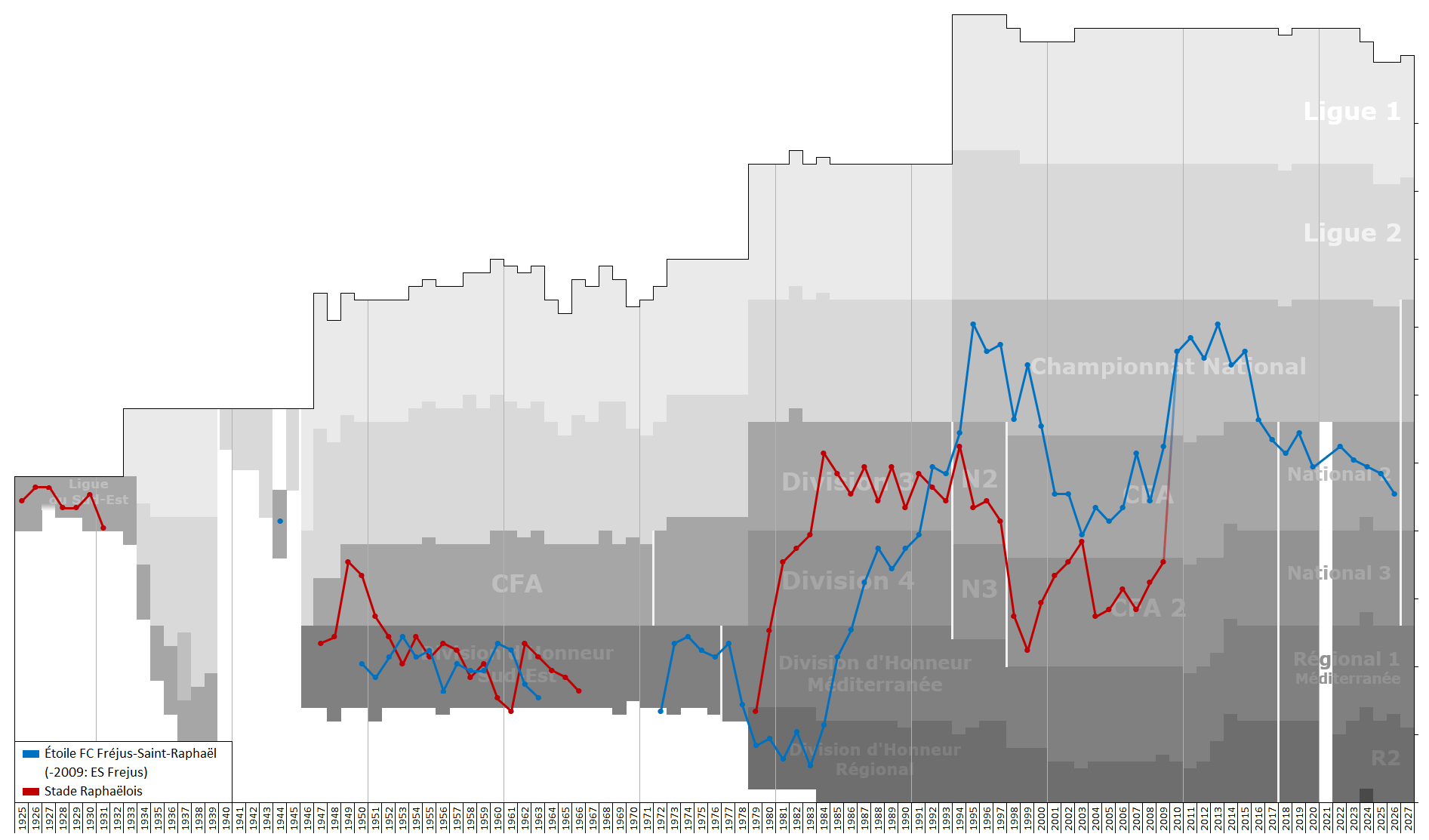
Historical league performance chart of ÉFC Fréjus Saint-Raphaël

=== Fréjus ===
- Division 4: 1991
- Division d'Honneur (Méditerranée): 1986

=== Saint-Raphaël ===
- USFSA Championship: 1912
- Division d'Honneur (Méditerranée): 1980
- USFSA League (Côte d'Azur) (6): 1908, 1909, 1911, 1912, 1913, 1914
