= 2023–24 Clermont Foot season =

Clermont Foot
2023–24 season
- President: Ahmet Schaefer
- Head coach: Pascal Gastien
- Stadium: Stade Gabriel Montpied
- Ligue 1: 18th (relegated)
- Coupe de France: Round of 32
- Top goalscorer: League: Muhammed Cham (8); All: Muhammed Cham (8)
- Average home league attendance: 9,772
Home colours	Away colours	Third colours

The 2023–24 season was Clermont Foot's 113th season in existence and third consecutive season in Ligue 1. They also competed in the Coupe de France.

Clermont officially suffered relegation on 12 May following a narrow 0–1 loss to Lyon. After a three-year absence, they thus made a return to Ligue 2.

== Players ==
=== First-team squad ===
As of 1 February 2024

Note: Flags indicate national team as defined under FIFA eligibility rules; some limited exceptions apply. Players may hold more than one non-FIFA nationality.

No.	Pos.	Nation	Player
1	GK	SEN	Massamba Ndiaye
2	DF	ALG	Mehdi Zeffane
3	DF	BRA	Neto Borges
4	DF	FRA	Chrislain Matsima (on loan from Monaco)
5	DF	BEL	Maximiliano Caufriez
6	MF	MLI	Habib Keïta
7	MF	FRA	Yohann Magnin
8	FW	FRA	Bilal Boutobba
9	FW	SRB	Komnen Andrić
10	MF	AUT	Muhammed Cham
11	FW	GAB	Jim Allevinah
12	MF	FRA	Maxime Gonalons (vice-captain)
15	DF	MLI	Cheick Oumar Konaté

No.	Pos.	Nation	Player
16	GK	FRA	Théo Borne
17	DF	FRA	Andy Pelmard
18	FW	KOS	Elbasan Rashani
21	DF	FRA	Florent Ogier (captain)
22	DF	FRA	Yoël Armougom
23	FW	JAM	Shamar Nicholson (on loan from Spartak Moscow)
25	MF	FRA	Johan Gastien (3rd captain)
26	FW	FRA	Alan Virginius (on loan from Lille)
91	FW	ANG	Jérémie Bela
95	FW	FRA	Grejohn Kyei
97	DF	FRA	Jérémy Jacquet (on loan from Rennes)
99	GK	SEN	Mory Diaw

=== Out on loan ===
Note: Flags indicate national team as defined under FIFA eligibility rules; some limited exceptions apply. Players may hold more than one non-FIFA nationality.

No.	Pos.	Nation	Player
—	GK	GBS	Ouparine Djoco (on loan to Francs Borains until 30 June 2024)
—	DF	SEN	Baïla Diallo (on loan to Austria Lustenau until 30 June 2024)
—	MF	GUI	Yadaly Diaby (at Austria Lustenau until 30 June 2024)
—	MF	CIV	Fred Gnalega (at Chamalières until 30 June 2024)
—	MF	MAR	Aïman Maurer (at Dunkerque until 30 June 2024)

No.	Pos.	Nation	Player
—	MF	FRA	Nassim L'Ghoul (at Biel-Bienne until 30 June 2024)
—	FW	FRA	Abdoulaye Coulibaly (at Biel-Bienne until 30 June 2024)
—	FW	FRA	Adama Diakité (at Trélissac until 30 June 2024)
—	FW	FRA	Thomas Perchaud (at Biel-Bienne until 30 June 2024)

=== Out on loan ===
Note: Flags indicate national team as defined under FIFA eligibility rules; some limited exceptions apply. Players may hold more than one non-FIFA nationality.

No.	Pos.	Nation	Player
—	GK	FRA	Ouparine Djoco (on loan to Francs Borains)
—	DF	SEN	Baïla Diallo (on loan to Austria Lustenau)

No.	Pos.	Nation	Player
—	MF	GUI	Yadaly Diaby (on loan to Austria Lustenau)
—	MF	CIV	Fred Gnalega (on loan to Chamalières)

== Transfers ==
=== In ===
Pos.	Player	Transferred from	Fee	Date	Source
DF	(Belgium) Maximiliano Caufriez	(Russia) Spartak Moscow	€3,500,000	1 July 2023	
DF	(Mali) Habib Keïta	(France) Lyon	€1,200,000	4 July 2023	
DF	(France) Andy Pelmard	(Switzerland) Basel	€1,900,000	12 July 2023	
FW	(Jamaica) Shamar Nicholson	(Russia) Spartak Moscow	Loan + €500,000	1 September 2023	
FW	(France) Alan Virginius	(France) Lille	Loan	9 January 2024	
DF	(France) Jérémy Jacquet	(France) Rennes	Loan	29 January 2024	
DF	(France) Chrislain Matsima	(France) Monaco	Loan	1 February 2024	

=== Out ===
Pos.	Player	Transferred to	Fee	Date	Source
MF	(Tunisia) Saîf-Eddine Khaoui	(United Arab Emirates) Khor Fakkan	Free	11 July 2023	
FW	(Ivory Coast) Charly Keita	(Belgium) Beerschot	Free	1 August 2023	
DF	(Poland) Mateusz Wieteska	(Italy) Cagliari	€5,000,000	29 August 2023	
FW	(France) Yanis Massolin	(Belgium) Francs Borains	Undisclosed	5 September 2023	
MF	(Morocco) Aïman Maurer	(France) Dunkerque	Loan	1 January 2024	
DF	(Ghana) Alidu Seidu	(France) Rennes	€11,000,000	29 January 2024	

== Pre-season and friendlies ==
Win Draw Loss Fixtures

26 July 2023 Friendly	Montpellier (France)	1–1	(France) Clermont	Millau
18:30 CEST (UTC+2)				Stadium: Stade Gabriel-Monteillet

29 July 2023 Friendly	Troyes (France)	0–1	(France) Clermont	Moulins
17:00 CEST (UTC+2)				Stadium: Stade Hector Rolland

5 August 2023 Friendly	Clermont (France)	1–0	(France) Le Havre	Orléans
17:00 CEST (UTC+2)				Stadium: Stade Marcel-Garcin

5 August 2023 Friendly	Clermont (France)	2–1	(France) Le Havre	Orléans
19:00 CEST (UTC+2)				Stadium: Stade Marcel-Garcin
Note: Match was played in two periods of thirty-five minutes each.

== Competitions ==
=== Overall record ===
Competition	First match	Last match	Starting round	Final position	Record							
Competition	First match	Last match	Starting round	Final position	Pld	W	D	L	GF	GA	GD	Win %
Ligue 1	13 August 2023	19 May 2024	Matchday 1	18th	34	5	10	19	26	60	−34	14.71
Coupe de France	5 January 2024	21 January 2024	Round of 64	Round of 32	2	0	1	1	2	4	−2	0.00
Total					36	5	11	20	28	64	−36	13.89

Source: Soccerway

=== Ligue 1 ===
==== League table ====
Pos	Team	Pld	W	D	L	GF	GA	GD	Pts	Qualification or relegation
14	Nantes	34	9	6	19	30	55	−25	33	
15	Le Havre	34	7	11	16	34	45	−11	32	
16	Metz (R)	34	8	5	21	35	58	−23	29 (Note: Metz finished ahead of Lorient on head-to-head away goals scored: Lorient 2–3 Metz, Metz 1–2 Lorient.)	Qualification for the Relegation play-offs
17	Lorient (R)	34	7	8	19	43	66	−23	29	Relegation to Ligue 2
18	Clermont (R)	34	5	10	19	26	60	−34	25	Relegation to Ligue 2

Source: Ligue 1
Rules for classification: 1) Points; 2) Goal difference; 3) Head-to-head points; 4) Head-to-head goal difference; 5) Head-to-head goals scored; 6) Head-to-head away goals scored; 7) Goals scored; 8) Away goals scored; 9) Fair-play points (Note: Head-to-head record is used only after all the matches between the teams in question have been played).
(R) Relegated

==== Results summary ====
Overall								Home						Away					
Pld	W	D	L	GF	GA	GD	Pts	W	D	L	GF	GA	GD	W	D	L	GF	GA	GD
34	5	10	19	26	60	−34	25	3	5	9	14	27	−13	2	5	10	12	33	−21

Source: Ligue 1

==== Results by round ====
Round	1	2	3	4	5	6	7	8	9	10	11	12	13	14	15	16	17	18	19	20	21	22	23	24	25	26	27	28	29	30	31	32	33	34
Ground	H	A	H	A	H	A	H	A	A	H	A	H	H	A	H	A	H	A	H	A	H	A	A	H	A	H	H	A	H	A	H	A	H	A
Result	L	L	L	D	L	L	D	D	W	L	D	W	L	L	D	L	L	W	D	L	D	L	D	L	L	W	L	D	D	L	W	L	L	L
Position	17	18	18	16	17	18	17	18	17	17	17	17	17	17	17	18	18	17	17	18	18	18	18	18	18	18	18	18	18	18	18	18	18	18

Source: Ligue 1
A = Away; H = Home; W = Win; D = Draw; L = Loss

==== Matches ====
The league fixtures were unveiled on 29 June 2023.

13 August 2023 1	Clermont	2–4	Monaco	Clermont-Ferrand
15:00 CEST (UTC+2)	Wieteska 7'; Cham 53'	Report	Magassa (yellow card) 21'; Vanderson 26'; Camara (yellow card) 35'; Ben Yedder 43', 70'; Akliouche 90+3', (yellow card) 90+5'; Matazo (yellow card) 90+8'	Stadium: Stade Gabriel Montpied; Attendance: 10,450; Referee: François Letexier

20 August 2023 2	Reims	2–0	Clermont	Reims
15:00 CEST (UTC+2)	Munetsi 17'; Daramy 84'	Report		Stadium: Stade Auguste-Delaune; Attendance: 12,887; Referee: Romain Lissorgue

27 August 2023 3	Clermont	0–1	Metz	Clermont-Ferrand
15:00 CEST (UTC+2)	Cham (yellow card) 58'	Report	Mikautadze 69'; Sabaly (yellow card) 84'	Stadium: Stade Gabriel Montpied; Attendance: 9,146; Referee: Gaël Angoula

3 September 2023 4	Toulouse	2–2	Clermont	Toulouse
13:00 CEST (UTC+2)	Aboukhlal 8'; Magri 15'; Dallinga (yellow card) 90+2'	Report	Kyei 34' (pen.); Boutobba (yellow card) 37'; Seidu (yellow card) 73'; Diaw (yellow card) 90+2'; Ogier 90+6'	Stadium: Stadium de Toulouse; Attendance: 28,285; Referee: Florent Batta

17 September 2023 5	Clermont	0–1	Nantes	Clermont-Ferrand
15:00 CEST (UTC+2)	Caufriez (yellow card) 82'; Keïta (yellow card) 88'; Cham (penalty missed) 90+6	Report	Simon 48'; Mollet (yellow card) 74'; Douglas Augusto (yellow card) 79'; Cömert (yellow card) 90+4'	Stadium: Stade Gabriel Montpied; Attendance: 9,759; Referee: Thomas Léonard

24 September 2023 6	Le Havre	2–1	Clermont	Le Havre
15:00 CEST (UTC+2)	Alioui 4'; Bayo 7'; Sangate (yellow card) 48'; Desmas (yellow card) 50'	Report	Gastien (yellow card) 22'; Konaté 45+2'; Nicholson (yellow card) 52'; Seidu (yellow card) 85'	Stadium: Stade Océane; Attendance: 18,071; Referee: Mathieu Vernice

30 September 2023 7	Clermont	0–0	Paris Saint-Germain	Clermont-Ferrand
17:00 CEST (UTC+2)	Gonalons (yellow card) 57'; Konaté (yellow card) 90'	Report	Zaïre-Emery (yellow card) 75'; Mbappé (yellow card) 81'; Fabián (yellow card) 90+3'	Stadium: Stade Gabriel Montpied; Attendance: 10,586; Referee: Marc Bollengier

22 October 2023 9	Lyon	1–2	Clermont	Décines-Charpieu
20:45 CEST (UTC+2)	Lovren (yellow card) 19'; Henrique (yellow card) 32'; Ogier 52' (o.g.); Tolisso (yellow card) 68'; O'Brien (yellow card) 90+4'	Report	Cham 10'; Gastien (yellow card) 22'; Magnin 35'; Ogier (yellow card) 45+2'; Seidu (yellow card) 86'; Rashani (yellow card) 90+5'; Diaw (yellow card) 90+7'	Stadium: Parc Olympique Lyonnais; Attendance: 43,999; Referee: Willy Delajod

27 October 2023 10	Clermont	0–1	Nice	Clermont-Ferrand
21:00 CEST (UTC+2)		Report	Laborde (penalty missed) 37'; Perraud (yellow card) 61'; Sanson (yellow card) 64'; Boudaoui 74'	Stadium: Stade Gabriel-Montpied; Attendance: 10,140; Referee: Jérémie Pignard

5 November 2023 11	Strasbourg	0–0	Clermont	Strasbourg
15:00 CET (UTC+1)	Senaya (yellow card) 51', (red card) 76'	Report		Stadium: Stade de la Meinau; Attendance: 25,039; Referee: Jérémy Stinat

12 November 2023 12	Clermont	1–0	Lorient	Clermont-Ferrand
15:00 CET (UTC+1)	Konaté (yellow card) 10'; Cham (yellow card) 47'; Nicholson 69' (pen.); Seidu (yellow card) 85'	Report	Touré (yellow card) 52'; F. Mendy (yellow card) 57'	Stadium: Stade Gabriel-Montpied; Attendance: 9,798; Referee: Romain Lissorgue

25 November 2023 13	Clermont	0–3	Lens	Clermont-Ferrand
17:00 CET (UTC+1)	Kyei (yellow card) 32'; Seidu (red card) 45+2'; Gonalons (yellow card) 68'	Report	Wahi 11', (yellow card) 45+1' (yellow-red card) 45+2'; Thomasson 50'; Khusanov (yellow card) 70'; Saïd 82'	Stadium: Stade Gabriel-Montpied; Attendance: 10,455; Referee: Benoît Millot

29 November 2023 8	Montpellier	1–1	Clermont	Montpellier
19:00 CET (UTC+1)	Fayad (yellow card) 40'; Sainte-Luce (yellow card) 52'; Savanier 86' (pen.); Omeragić (yellow card) 90+4'; Estève (yellow card) 90+7' (yellow-red card) 90+7'; Leroy (yellow card) 90+7'	Report	Gonalons 7', (yellow card) 90+7'; Konaté (yellow card) 8'; Caufriez (yellow card) 38' (yellow-red card) 90+7'; Pelmard (yellow card) 74'; Keïta (yellow card) 76'; Borges (red card) 90+7'	Stadium: Stade de la Mosson; Attendance: 0 Referee: Mathieu Vernice
Note: The match was originally played on 8 October 2023, but was abandoned in second-half stoppage time, with Montpellier leading 4–2, after a firework thrown from a Montpellier stand exploded near Clermont goalkeeper Mory Diaw. The teams were then ordered to replay the match from the beginning behind closed doors at a later date.

3 December 2023 14	Brest	3–0	Clermont	Brest
15:00 CET (UTC+1)	Del Castillo 20' (pen.), 51'; Pereira Lage 34'; Locko (yellow card) 44'	Report	Konaté (yellow card) 19'; Zeffane (yellow card) 70'	Stadium: Stade Francis-Le Blé; Attendance: 14,324; Referee: Marc Bollengier

10 December 2023 15	Clermont	0–0	Lille	Clermont-Ferrand
15:00 CET (UTC+1)	Rashani (yellow card) 68'; Zeffane (yellow card) 82'	Report	Yoro (yellow card) 34'; Yazıcı (yellow card) 90+2'	Stadium: Stade Gabriel Montpied; Attendance: 8,789; Referee: Florent Batta

17 December 2023 16	Marseille	2–1	Clermont	Marseille
17:05 CET (UTC+1)	Murillo 26'; Harit 42'	Report	Allevinah 58'; Seidu (yellow card) 67'; Caufriez (yellow card) 88'	Stadium: Stade Vélodrome; Attendance: 63,751; Referee: Gaël Angoula

20 December 2023 17	Clermont	1–3	Rennes	Clermont-Ferrand
21:00 CET (UTC+1)	Nicholson 4'; Caufriez (red card) 45+2'	Report	Gallon (yellow card) 33'; Kalimuendo 52', (yellow card) 73'; D. Doué 88', (yellow card) 89'; Blas 90+7' (pen.)	Stadium: Stade Gabriel-Montpied; Attendance: 8,840; Referee: Eric Wattellier

14 January 2024 18	Nantes	1–2	Clermont	Nantes
15:00 CET (UTC+1)	Mollet (yellow card) 38', (goal) 47'; Traoré (red card) 73'	Report	Nicholson 29'; Gastien (yellow card) 54'; Allevinah 89'	Stadium: Stade de la Beaujoire; Attendance: 20,866; Referee: Romain Lissorgue

28 January 2024 19	Clermont	1–1	Strasbourg	Clermont-Ferrand
15:00 CET (UTC+1)	Borges (yellow card) 36'; Nicholson 52'	Report	Sahi 34'; Sissoko (yellow card) 59'; Delaine (yellow card) 81'; Bakwa (yellow card) 90+8'	Stadium: Stade Gabriel-Montpied; Attendance: 9,047; Referee: Benoît Millot

4 February 2024 20	Lille	4–0	Clermont	Villeneuve-d'Ascq
15:00 CET (UTC+1)	David 10', 38'; André 25'; Zhegrova 40'	Report	Nicholson (yellow card) 25'	Stadium: Stade Pierre-Mauroy; Attendance: 38,597; Referee: Bastien Dechepy

11 February 2024 21	Clermont	1–1	Brest	Clermont-Ferrand
15:00 CET (UTC+1)	Gastien (yellow card) 45'; Caufriez (yellow card) 50'; Kyei 69'; Rashani (red card) 88'	Report	Pereira Lage (yellow card) 7'; Le Cardinal (yellow card) 33'; Lees-Melou 50'; Del Castillo (yellow card) 54'; Martin (yellow card) 75'; Bizot (red card) 88'	Stadium: Stade Gabriel-Montpied; Attendance: 8,893; Referee: Stéphanie Frappart

18 February 2024 22	Rennes	3–1	Clermont	Rennes
15:00 CET (UTC+1)	Omari 31'; Blas (penalty missed) 40'; Terrier 58', 64'; Seidu (yellow card) 66'	Report	Matsima 62'; Caufriez (red card) 77'	Stadium: Roazhon Park; Attendance: 27,501; Referee: Romain Lissorgue

25 February 2024 23	Nice	0–0	Clermont	Nice
15:00 CET (UTC+1)	Thuram (yellow card) 8'; Dante (yellow card) 45+5'	Report	Gonalons (yellow card) 31'; Nicholson (penalty missed) 45+6'	Stadium: Allianz Riviera; Attendance: 22,081; Referee: Hakim Ben El Hadj

2 March 2024 24	Clermont	1–5	Marseille	Clermont-Ferrand
21:00 CET (UTC+1)	Cham (yellow card) 34'; Borges (yellow card) 45+1'; Boutobba 53'	Report	Ndiaye 23'; Aubameyang 59'; Clauss 67'; Kondogbia (yellow card) 68'; Luis Henrique 80'; Moumbagna 90+2'	Stadium: Stade Gabriel-Montpied; Attendance: 10,692; Referee: Thomas Léonard

10 March 2024 25	Metz	1–0	Clermont	Metz
15:00 CET (UTC+1)	Mikautadze 33' (pen.); Jean Jacques (yellow card) 39'	Report	Matsima (yellow card) 45'; Borges (yellow card) 53'; Gastien (yellow card) 60'	Stadium: Stade Saint-Symphorien; Attendance: 22,673; Referee: Gaël Angoula

17 March 2024 26	Clermont	2–1	Le Havre	Clermont-Ferrand
15:00 CET (UTC+1)	Cham 12', 45+3' (pen.); Keïta (yellow card) 31'; Rashani (yellow card) 31', (red card) 31'; Gastien (yellow card) 47'	Report	Targhalline (yellow card) 34' (yellow-red card) 66'; Ayew 45+1'; Lloris (yellow card) 45+3'; Sangante (yellow card) 58'; Kechta (yellow card) 90+7'	Stadium: Stade Gabriel-Montpied; Attendance: 9,638; Referee: Marc Bollengier

31 March 2024 27	Clermont	0–3	Toulouse	Clermont-Ferrand
15:00 CEST (UTC+2)	Caufriez (yellow card) 6'; Armougom (yellow card) 45+5'; M'Bahia (yellow card) 78'	Report	Sierro 8' (pen.), 79', (yellow card) 18'; Dallinga 73'	Stadium: Stade Gabriel-Montpied; Attendance: 10,499; Referee: Pierre Gaillouste

6 April 2024 28	Paris Saint-Germain	1–1	Clermont	Paris
21:00 CEST (UTC+2)	Ugarte (yellow card) 76'; Ramos 85'	Report	Keïta 32'	Stadium: Parc des Princes; Attendance: 47,607; Referee: Gaël Angoula

14 April 2024 29	Clermont	1–1	Montpellier	Clermont-Ferrand
15:00 CEST (UTC+2)	Cham 45+5' (pen.); Matsima (yellow card) 90+4'	Report	Coulibaly 56', (yellow card) 57'	Stadium: Stade Gabriel-Montpied; Attendance: 10,174; Referee: Thomas Léonard

20 April 2024 30	Lens	1–0	Clermont	Lens
21:00 CEST (UTC+2)	Sotoca 3' (pen.); Machado (yellow card) 54'	Report	Gastien (yellow card) 18'; Rashani (yellow card) 40'; Keïta (yellow card) 45'; Magnin (yellow card) 79'	Stadium: Stade Bollaert-Delelis; Attendance: 37,495; Referee: Benoît Bastien

28 April 2024 31	Clermont	4–1	Reims	Clermont-Ferrand
15:00 CEST (UTC+2)	Cham 31' (pen.), 56' (pen.); Rashani 79', 90'	Report	Nakamura 33'; Koudou (yellow card) 54'; Koné (yellow card) 59'; Teuma (yellow card) 60'; De Smet (red card) 77'	Stadium: Stade Gabriel-Montpied; Attendance: 8,713; Referee: Florent Batta

4 May 2024 32	Monaco	4–1	Clermont	Monaco
17:00 CEST (UTC+2)	Minamino 16', (yellow card) 69'; Embolo 37'; Akliouche (yellow card) 51'; Ben Yedder 57', 87'; Vanderson (yellow card) 61'	Report	Cham 34'; Bouchenna (yellow card) 90'	Stadium: Stade Louis II; Attendance: 7,256; Referee: Hakim Ben El Hadj

12 May 2024 33	Clermont	0–1	Lyon	Clermont-Ferrand
21:00 CEST (UTC+2)	Cham (yellow card) 90+3'	Report	Mangala 53'; Orban (yellow card) 62'; Mata (yellow card) 89'	Stadium: Stade Gabriel-Montpied; Attendance: 10,603; Referee: Pierre Gaillouste

19 May 2024 34	Lorient	5–0	Clermont	Lorient
21:00 CEST (UTC+2)	Laporte (yellow card) 20'; Abergel 38'; Bamba 42' (pen.); Bouanani 54'; Dieng 63', 90', (yellow card) 69'; Ponceau (yellow card) 72'	Report	Magnin (yellow card) 12'; Allevinah (yellow card) 73'; Diaw (yellow card) 90+4'	Stadium: Stade du Moustoir; Attendance: 16,176; Referee: Clément Turpin

=== Coupe de France ===
5 January 2024 Round of 64	Metz	1–1 (1–3 p)	Clermont	Metz
20:45 CET (UTC+1)	S. Sané 21'	Report	Allevinah 48'	Stadium: Stade Saint-Symphorien; Attendance: 14,987; Referee: Jérémie Pignard
	Penalties
	Asoro (penalty missed); Diallo (penalty scored); Colin (penalty missed); Kouao (penalty missed)		(penalty scored) Allevinah; (penalty missed) Ogier; (penalty scored) Borges; (penalty scored) Zeffane

21 January 2024 Round of 32	Clermont	1–3	Strasbourg	Clermont-Ferrand
17:30 CET (UTC+1)	Keïta (yellow card) 52'; Ogier (yellow card) 59'; Nicholson (penalty missed) 88'; Zeffane 88'	Report	Sylla 32'; Guilbert (yellow card) 45+2'; Diarra 49'; Bakwa 60'; Emegha (yellow card) 73'; Doukouré (yellow card) 83'	Stadium: Stade Gabriel-Montpied; Attendance: 8,128; Referee: Mathieu Vernice
