= 2022–23 Clermont Foot season =

Clermont Foot
2022–23 season
- Chairman: Ahmet Schaefer
- Head coach: Pascal Gastien
- Stadium: Stade Gabriel Montpied
- Ligue 1: 8th
- Coupe de France: Round of 64
- Top goalscorer: League: Grejohn Kyei (10); All: Grejohn Kyei (10)
Home colours	Away colours	Third colours

The 2022–23 season was the 112th season in the history of Clermont Foot and their second consecutive season in the top flight. The club participated in Ligue 1 and the Coupe de France. The season covers the period from 1 July 2022 to 30 June 2023.

== Players ==
As of 24 January 2023

Note: Flags indicate national team as defined under FIFA eligibility rules; some limited exceptions apply. Players may hold more than one non-FIFA nationality.

No.	Pos.	Nation	Player
2	DF	ALG	Mehdi Zeffane
3	DF	BRA	Neto Borges
4	DF	POL	Mateusz Wieteska
5	DF	BEL	Maximiliano Caufriez (on loan from Spartak Moscow)
7	MF	FRA	Yohann Magnin
9	FW	SRB	Komnen Andrić
10	MF	TUN	Saîf-Eddine Khaoui
11	FW	GAB	Jim Allevinah
12	MF	FRA	Maxime Gonalons
13	DF	FRA	Souleymane Cissé
16	GK	FRA	Lucas Margueron
17	DF	FRA	Olivier Kamdem

No.	Pos.	Nation	Player
18	FW	KOS	Elbasan Rashani
21	DF	FRA	Florent Ogier (captain)
23	MF	BEL	Brandon Baiye
25	MF	FRA	Johan Gastien (vice-captain)
31	DF	SEN	Baïla Diallo
36	DF	GHA	Alidu Seidu
40	GK	FRA	Ouparine Djoco
70	MF	AUT	Muhammed Cham
91	FW	ANG	Jérémie Bela
95	FW	FRA	Grejohn Kyei
97	MF	FRA	Yanis Massolin
99	GK	SEN	Mory Diaw

=== Out on loan ===
Note: Flags indicate national team as defined under FIFA eligibility rules; some limited exceptions apply. Players may hold more than one non-FIFA nationality.

No.	Pos.	Nation	Player
—	MF	ALG	Yuliwes Bellache (at Austria Lustenau until 30 June 2023)
—	MF	FRA	Naël Jaby (at Moulins Yzeure until 30 June 2023)

No.	Pos.	Nation	Player
—	MF	TUR	Cem Türkmen (at Austria Lustenau until 30 June 2023)
—	FW	FRA	Yadaly Diaby (at Austria Lustenau until 30 June 2023)

== Pre-season and friendlies ==
Win Draw Loss Fixtures

9 July 2022 Friendly	Grenoble (France)	1–0	(France) Clermont	Le Chambon-sur-Lignon
17:00 CEST (UTC+2)	Correa 77' (pen.)			Stadium: Stade Municipal

13 July 2022 Friendly	Clermont (France)	4–2	(France) UNFP	Vichy
18:00 CEST (UTC+2)	Chader 50', 78', 90+2'; Bellache 65'		Dossevi 20'; Dos Santos 90+8'	Stadium: Stade Louis Darragon

16 July 2022 Friendly	Clermont (France)	1–3	(France) Lens	Rodez
16:00 CEST (UTC+2)	Chader 76'		Machado 34'; Kakuta 40'; Saïd 87'	Stadium: Stade Paul Lignon

20 July 2022 Friendly	Montpellier (France)	0–2	(France) Clermont	Millau
--:-- CEST (UTC+2)	Sakho (yellow card) 42'		Andrić 17', 38', (yellow card) 42'; Kyei (yellow card) 75'	Stadium: Terrain Alex Katona

23 July 2022 Friendly	Clermont (France)	2–0	(France) Rodez	Clermont-Ferrand
18:00 CEST (UTC+2)	Kyei 44'; Khaoui 51'			Stadium: Stade Philippe Marcombes

22 September 2022 Friendly	Bordeaux (France)	2–3	(France) Clermont	Limoges
18:00 CEST (UTC+2)	Maja 45'; Bakwa 60'		Magnin 21'; Andrić 41', 90'	Stadium: Stade de Beaublanc

9 December 2022 Friendly	Valencia (Spain)	4–2	(France) Clermont	Valencia, Spain
14:00 CET (UTC+1)	Lino 22'; Castillejo 58', 82'; Kluivert 90'		Kyei 73'; Khaoui 75'	Stadium: Ciudad Deportiva de Paterna; Referee: Escriche Guzmán (Spain)

13 December 2022 Friendly	Valladolid (Spain)	0–0	(France) Clermont	San Pedro del Pinatar, Spain
17:00 CET (UTC+1)				Stadium: Pinatar Arena Football Center

17 December 2022 Friendly	Clermont (France)	Cancelled	(France) Dijon	Yzeure
16:00 CET (UTC+1)				Stadium: Stade de Bellevue

20 December 2022 Friendly	Clermont (France)	0–1	(France) Sochaux	Roanne
16:00 CET (UTC+1)				Stadium: Stade Henri Malleval

== Competitions ==
=== Overall record ===
Competition	First match	Last match	Starting round	Final position	Record							
Competition	First match	Last match	Starting round	Final position	Pld	W	D	L	GF	GA	GD	Win %
Ligue 1	6 August 2022	3 June 2023	Matchday 1	8th	38	17	8	13	45	49	−4	44.74
Coupe de France	7 January 2023		Round of 64	Round of 64	1	0	1	0	0	0	+0	0.00
Total					39	17	9	13	45	49	−4	43.59

Source: Soccerway

=== Ligue 1 ===
==== League table ====
Pos	Team	Pld	W	D	L	GF	GA	GD	Pts
6	Monaco	38	19	8	11	70	58	+12	65
7	Lyon	38	18	8	12	65	47	+18	62
8	Clermont	38	17	8	13	45	49	−4	59
9	Nice	38	15	13	10	48	37	+11	58
10	Lorient	38	15	10	13	52	53	−1	55

Source: Ligue 1
Rules for classification: 1) Points; 2) Goal difference; 3) Head-to-head points; 4) Head-to-head goal difference; 5) Head-to-head goals scored; 6) Head-to-head away goals scored; 7) Goals scored; 8) Away goals scored; 9) Fair-play points (Note: Head-to-head record is used only after all the matches between the teams in question have been played).

==== Results summary ====
Overall								Home						Away					
Pld	W	D	L	GF	GA	GD	Pts	W	D	L	GF	GA	GD	W	D	L	GF	GA	GD
38	17	8	13	45	49	−4	59	9	3	7	20	28	−8	8	5	6	25	21	+4

Source: Ligue 1

==== Results by round ====
Round	1	2	3	4	5	6	7	8	9	10	11	12	13	14	15	16	17	18	19	20	21	22	23	24	25	26	27	28	29	30	31	32	33	34	35	36	37	38
Ground	H	A	H	A	A	H	A	H	A	H	A	H	A	H	A	H	A	H	A	H	A	H	H	A	H	A	H	A	H	A	H	A	H	A	H	A	H	A
Result	L	W	W	L	L	W	D	L	W	W	D	L	D	D	L	L	W	W	W	D	D	L	L	L	D	W	L	L	W	W	W	W	W	D	W	L	W	W
Position	20	10	5	9	12	8	9	11	9	8	9	9	9	10	10	11	9	9	8	8	9	11	12	12	12	11	12	13	12	11	11	9	8	11	8	8	8	8

Source: Ligue 1
A = Away; H = Home; W = Win; D = Draw; L = Loss

==== Matches ====
The league fixtures were announced on 17 June 2022.

6 August 2022 1	Clermont	0–5	Paris Saint-Germain	Clermont-Ferrand
21:00 CEST (UTC+2)	Allevinah (yellow card) 38'; Gonalons (yellow card) 67'	Report	Neymar 9'; Vitinha (yellow card) 13'; Hakimi 26'; Marquinhos 38'; Messi 80', 86'	Stadium: Stade Gabriel Montpied; Attendance: 12,203; Referee: Jérémy Stinat

14 August 2022 2	Reims	2–4	Clermont	Reims
15:00 CEST (UTC+2)	Balogun (yellow card) 7', (goal) 30' (pen.); Doumbia 23' (pen.); Agbadou (red card) 47'; Van Bergen (yellow card) 51'; Gravillon (yellow card) 71'	Report	Ogier (yellow card) 21'; Magnin (yellow card) 29'; Gastien (yellow card) 35'; Andrić 51' (pen.), 62'; Cham 72'; Bela 77'	Stadium: Stade Auguste-Delaune; Attendance: 9,456; Referee: Johan Hamel

21 August 2022 3	Clermont	1–0	Nice	Clermont-Ferrand
15:00 CEST (UTC+2)	Khaoui 5'; Gonalons (yellow card) 59'	Report	Todibo (yellow card) 60' (yellow-red card) 81'; Lemina (red card) 79'	Stadium: Stade Gabriel Montpied; Attendance: 11,500; Referee: Thomas Léonard

28 August 2022 4	Lorient	2–1	Clermont	Lorient
15:00 CEST (UTC+2)	Kalulu (yellow card) 15'; Moffi 24' (pen.), 41'	Report	Neto (yellow card) 22' (yellow-red card) 48'; Gonalons (yellow card) 39'; Cham 62'	Stadium: Stade du Moustoir; Attendance: 10,591; Referee: Willy Delajod

31 August 2022 5	Marseille	1–0	Clermont	Marseille
21:00 CEST (UTC+2)	Rongier (yellow card) 44'; Gueye 49'; Sánchez (penalty missed) 87'; Bailly (yellow card) 90+2'	Report	Andrić (yellow card) 37'; Seidu (yellow card) 64'	Stadium: Stade Vélodrome; Attendance: 62,763; Referee: Eric Wattellier

4 September 2022 6	Clermont	2–0	Toulouse	Clermont-Ferrand
15:00 CEST (UTC+2)	Kyei (yellow card) 15'; Wieteska (yellow card) 23'; Gonalons 46'; Gastien (yellow card) 66'; Seidu (yellow card) 75'; Cham 90+6'	Report	Sylla (yellow card) 63'	Stadium: Stade Gabriel Montpied; Attendance: 10,085; Referee: François Letexier

11 September 2022 7	Strasbourg	0–0	Clermont	Strasbourg
13:00 CEST (UTC+2)	Ajorque (yellow card) 25'; Le Marchand (yellow card) 43' (yellow-red card) 89'; Sels (yellow card) 43'	Report	Andrić (yellow card) 26'; Caufriez (yellow card) 60'	Stadium: Stade de la Meinau; Attendance: 25,089; Referee: Marc Bollengier

18 September 2022 8	Clermont	1–3	Troyes	Clermont-Ferrand
15:00 CEST (UTC+2)	Gastien 3'	Report	M. Baldé 23', 54'; Bruus (yellow card) 46'; Agoumé (yellow card) 51'; Yade (yellow card) 52'; Ripart 83'	Stadium: Stade Gabriel Montpied; Attendance: 10,753; Referee: Jérôme Brisard

2 October 2022 9	Ajaccio	1–3	Clermont	Ajaccio
15:00 CEST (UTC+2)	Alphonse (yellow card) 64'; Avinel 70'; Bayala (yellow card) 76'; Diallo (yellow card) 88'	Report	Kyei 11'; Gastien (yellow card) 45'; Zeffane (yellow card) 73'; Caufriez (yellow card) 76'; Rashani 89'; Dossou 90+1'	Stadium: Stade François Coty; Attendance: 6,610; Referee: Clément Turpin

9 October 2022 10	Clermont	2–1	Auxerre	Clermont-Ferrand
15:00 CEST (UTC+2)	Khaoui 55'; Kyei 58'	Report	Jubal 90+1'	Stadium: Stade Gabriel Montpied; Attendance: 11,119; Referee: Mathieu Vernice

16 October 2022 11	Monaco	1–1	Clermont	Monaco
17:05 CEST (UTC+2)	Camara (red card) 14'; Embolo (penalty missed) 31', 31'; Jakobs (yellow card) 87'; Diatta (yellow card) 90+1'; Nübel (yellow card) 90+4'	Report	Rashani (yellow card) 48'; Andrić 53'; Khaoui (yellow card) 63'; Magnin (yellow card) 67'; Seidu (yellow card) 87'	Stadium: Stade Louis II; Attendance: 4,731; Referee: Ruddy Buquet

23 October 2022 12	Clermont	1–3	Brest	Clermont-Ferrand
15:00 CEST (UTC+2)	Seidu (yellow card) 37'; Magnin (yellow card) 41'; Caufriez (yellow card) 61'; Allevinah 89'; Wieteska (yellow card) 90+2'	Report	Del Castillo 15' (pen.); Slimani (yellow card) 37'; Honorat 55'; Le Douaron 68'	Stadium: Stade Gabriel Montpied; Attendance: 7,275; Referee: Jérémie Pignard

30 October 2022 13	Nantes	1–1	Clermont	Nantes
15:00 CET (UTC+1)	Mohamed 73'	Report	Caufriez (yellow card) 32'; Borges 54'; Magnin (yellow card) 67'	Stadium: Stade de la Beaujoire; Attendance: 30,894; Referee: Benoît Bastien

6 November 2022 14	Clermont	1–1	Montpellier	Clermont-Ferrand
15:00 CET (UTC+1)	Ogier (yellow card) 42'; Andrić (penalty missed) 41', 62'; Kyei (penalty missed) 78'	Report	Savanier 10' (pen.); Cozza (yellow card) 34'; Khazri (yellow card) 81'	Stadium: Stade Gabriel Montpied; Attendance: 10,990; Referee: Marc Bollengier

12 November 2022 15	Lens	2–1	Clermont	Lens
17:00 CET (UTC+1)	Saïd 60'; Abdul Samed (yellow card) 65'; Fofana 68'	Report	Abdul Samed 38' (o.g.); Kyei (yellow card) 42'; Gastien (yellow card) 45+1'; Andrić (yellow card) 85'	Stadium: Stade Bollaert-Delelis; Attendance: 37,519; Referee: Hakim Ben El Hadj

28 December 2022 16	Clermont	0–2	Lille	Clermont-Ferrand
19:00 CET (UTC+1)	Gastien (yellow card) 5'; Seidu (yellow card) 33'; Caufriez (yellow card) 45+2' (yellow-red card) 90+1'	Report	André (yellow card) 31'; Ang. Gomes 68' (pen.); Cabella (yellow card) 72'; Bayo 90+3'	Stadium: Stade Gabriel Montpied; Attendance: 13,122; Referee: François Letexier

1 January 2023 17	Lyon	0–1	Clermont	Décines-Charpieu
17:00 CET (UTC+1)	Kumbedi (yellow card) 70'	Report	Wieteska (yellow card) 5'; Khaoui (yellow card) 45+1'; Cham 86' (pen.), (yellow card) 88'	Stadium: Groupama Stadium; Attendance: 30,000; Referee: Stéphanie Frappart

11 January 2023 18	Clermont	2–1	Rennes	Clermont-Ferrand
19:00 CET (UTC+1)	Kyei 30'; Gastien 90+4'	Report	Bourigeaud (yellow card) 45' (yellow-red card) 76'; Kalimuendo 73'; Omari (red card) 82'	Stadium: Stade Gabriel Montpied; Attendance: 10,648; Referee: Clément Turpin

15 January 2023 19	Angers	1–2	Clermont	Angers
15:00 CET (UTC+1)	Capelle (yellow card) 42'; Hountondji (yellow card) 60'; Boufal 80'	Report	Rashani 40'; Borges 47', (yellow card) 79'; Caufriez (yellow card) 83'	Stadium: Stade Raymond Kopa; Attendance: 12,160; Referee: Mathieu Vernice

29 January 2023 20	Clermont	0–0	Nantes	Clermont-Ferrand
15:00 CET (UTC+1)	Caufriez (yellow card) 12'; Seidu (yellow card) 54'	Report	Sissoko (yellow card) 12'	Stadium: Stade Gabriel Montpied; Attendance: 11,015; Referee: Florent Batta

1 February 2023 21	Lille	0–0	Clermont	Villeneuve-d'Ascq
19:00 CET (UTC+1)		Report	Khaoui (yellow card) 54'	Stadium: Stade Pierre-Mauroy; Attendance: 32,498; Referee: Jérémy Stinat

5 February 2023 22	Clermont	0–2	Monaco	Clermont-Ferrand
13:00 CET (UTC+1)	Khaoui (yellow card) 84'	Report	Maripán 3'; Embolo 13'; Aguilar (yellow card) 75'; Minamino (yellow card) 85'	Stadium: Stade Gabriel Montpied; Attendance: 11,598; Referee: Marc Bollengier

11 February 2023 23	Clermont	0–2	Marseille	Clermont-Ferrand
21:00 CET (UTC+1)	Magnin (yellow card) 35'; Cham (yellow card) 43'; Wieteska (yellow card) 44'; Allevinah (yellow card) 52'	Report	Balerdi (yellow card) 25'; Sánchez 44' (pen.), 81', (yellow card) 68'; Ünder (yellow card) 84'	Stadium: Stade Gabriel Montpied; Attendance: 13,576; Referee: Ruddy Buquet

19 February 2023 24	Rennes	2–0	Clermont	Rennes
15:00 CET (UTC+1)	Kalimuendo 37', 64'	Report	Wieteska (yellow card) 48'; Rashani (yellow card) 52'	Stadium: Roazhon Park; Attendance: 27,798; Referee: Bastien Dechepy

26 February 2023 25	Clermont	1–1	Strasbourg	Clermont-Ferrand
15:00 CET (UTC+1)	Konaté (yellow card) 17'; Rashani 65'	Report	Sanson (yellow card) 21'; Djiku (yellow card) 23'; Diallo 34'; Guilbert (yellow card) 44'; Doukouré (yellow card) 67'	Stadium: Stade Gabriel Montpied; Attendance: 10,221; Referee: Willy Delajod

5 March 2023 26	Toulouse	0–1	Clermont	Toulouse
15:00 CET (UTC+1)	Nicolaisen (yellow card) 38'; Desler (yellow card) 40'; Van den Boomen (yellow card) 81'; Hamulic (yellow card) 88'	Report	Ogier (yellow card) 43'; Khaoui 76'	Stadium: Stadium de Toulouse; Attendance: 20,620; Referee: Florent Batta

12 March 2023 27	Clermont	0–4	Lens	Clermont-Ferrand
13:00 CET (UTC+1)	Borges (yellow card) 40'	Report	Openda 31', 34', 35'; Haïdara (yellow card) 45'; Claude-Maurice 76'; Machado (yellow card) 86'	Stadium: Stade Gabriel Montpied; Attendance: 12,311; Referee: Jérémy Stinat

19 March 2023 28	Montpellier	2–1	Clermont	Montpellier
15:00 CET (UTC+1)	Wahi 60', 71'; Khazri (yellow card) 85'; Ferri (yellow card) 90' (yellow-red card) 90+1'	Report	Khaoui 31'; Gastien (yellow card) 56'	Stadium: Stade de la Mosson; Attendance: 13,166; Referee: Pierre Gaillouste

2 April 2023 29	Clermont	2–1	Ajaccio	Clermont-Ferrand
15:00 CEST (UTC+2)	Konaté (yellow card) 54'; Kyei 60' (pen.), 90+3' (pen.); Seidu (yellow card) 71'	Report	El Idrissy 25'; Soumano (yellow card) 58'; Vidal (yellow card) 60'; Youssouf (red card) 77'; Leroy (yellow card) 83'; Alphonse (yellow card) 90+1'; Coutadeur (yellow card) 90+1'	Stadium: Stade Gabriel Montpied; Attendance: 9,436; Referee: Mathieu Vernice

9 April 2023 30	Troyes	0–2	Clermont	Troyes
15:00 CEST (UTC+2)	Kouamé (yellow card) 19'; Salmier (yellow card) 38'; Rami (yellow card) 90+3'	Report	Cham 26'; Gastien 29'; Magnin (yellow card) 81'; Seid (yellow card) 85'	Stadium: Stade de l'Aube; Attendance: 7,777; Referee: Jérémy Stinat

16 April 2023 31	Clermont	2–1	Angers	Clermont-Ferrand
15:00 CEST (UTC+2)	Kyei 33' (pen.); Cham 39' (pen.); Borges (red card) 45+2'; Seidu (yellow card) 90', (red card) 90+6'	Report	Hunou 28', (yellow card) 32'; Valery (yellow card) 90+6'	Stadium: Stade Gabriel Montpied; Attendance: 10,789; Referee: Thomas Léonard

23 April 2023 32	Nice	1–2	Clermont	Nice
15:00 CEST (UTC+2)	Bard (yellow card) 30'; Laborde 41'	Report	Cham 37'; Caufriez (yellow card) 49'; Kyei (yellow card) 74'; Khaoui 83'	Stadium: Allianz Riviera; Attendance: 20,578; Referee: Benoît Millot

30 April 2023 33	Clermont	1–0	Reims	Clermont-Ferrand
15:00 CEST (UTC+2)	Kyei 4'; Wieteska (red card) 80'	Report	Balogun (yellow card) 81'; Munetsi (yellow card) 90+2'	Stadium: Stade Gabriel Montpied; Attendance: 11,446; Referee: Stéphanie Frappart

7 May 2023 34	Auxerre	1–1	Clermont	Auxerre
15:00 CEST (UTC+2)	I. Touré 36'; Zedadka (yellow card) 88'	Report	Khaoui 54'	Stadium: Stade de l'Abbé-Deschamps; Attendance: 16,330; Referee: Marc Bollengier

14 May 2023 35	Clermont	2–1	Lyon	Clermont-Ferrand
17:00 CEST (UTC+2)	Kyei 25' (pen.), 65'; Ogier (yellow card) 29'; Andrić (yellow card) 90+5'; Rashani (yellow card) 90+6'	Report	Lacazette 21', (penalty missed) 90+6'; Lukeba (yellow card) 73'; Tagliafico (yellow card) 84'; Lopes (yellow card) 90+6'	Stadium: Stade Gabriel Montpied; Attendance: 13,191; Referee: Ruddy Buquet

21 May 2023 36	Brest	2–1	Clermont	Brest
15:00 CET (UTC+1)	Honorat 45'; Mounié 48'; Camara (yellow card) 90+1'; Brassier (yellow card) 90+2'	Report	Borges 43'; Seidu (yellow card) 57'; Gastien (yellow card) 90+1'; Caufriez (yellow card) 90+2'; Wieteska (yellow card) 90+4'	Stadium: Stade Francis-Le Blé; Attendance: 13,751; Referee: Bastien Dechepy

27 May 2023 37	Clermont	2–0	Lorient	Clermont-Ferrand
21:00 CEST (UTC+2)	Khaoui 44'; Caufriez 74'	Report	Koné (penalty missed) 43'	Stadium: Stade Gabriel Montpied; Attendance: 13,050; Referee: Florent Batta

3 June 2023 38	Paris Saint-Germain	2–3	Clermont	Paris
21:00 CEST (UTC+2)	Ramos 16'; Mbappé 21' (pen.), (yellow card) 28'; Pereira (yellow card) 76'	Report	Gastien 24'; Kyei (penalty missed) 37', 63'; Zeffane 45+1'; Wieteska (yellow card) 90+4'	Stadium: Parc des Princes; Attendance: 47,926; Referee: Thomas Léonard

=== Coupe de France ===
7 January 2023 Round of 64	FCO Strasbourg Koenigshoffen 06	0–0 (4–3 p)	Clermont	Strasbourg
15:30 CET (UTC+1)		Report		Stadium: Stade Émile-Stahl; Attendance: 2,700; Referee: Benoît Bastien
	Penalties
	Cherief (penalty scored); Mouakit (penalty scored); Tine (penalty missed); Ibrahim Sidow (penalty scored); Kekambus (penalty scored)		(penalty scored) Cham; (penalty missed) Allevinah; (penalty scored) Massolin; (penalty scored) Ogier; (penalty missed) Diallo
