= Muhammed Cham =

Austrian footballer (born 2000)

Personal information
- Full name: Muhammed-Cham Saračević
- Date of birth: 26 September 2000 (age 26)
- Place of birth: Vienna, Austria
- Height: 1.80 m (5 ft 11 in)
- Position: Attacking midfielder

Team information
- Current team: Red Star Belgrade (on loan from Trabzonspor)
- Number: 70

Youth career
- 2006–2008: SC Red Star Penzing
- 2008–2016: Hannover 96
- 2016–2019: VfL Wolfsburg

Senior career*
Years	Team	Apps	(Gls)
2018–2019	VfL Wolfsburg II	3	(0)
2019–2020	Admira Wacker	18	(0)
2020–2024	Clermont	71	(15)
2020–2021	→ Vendsyssel (loan)	22	(2)
2021–2022	→ Austria Lustenau (loan)	29	(15)
2024–	Trabzonspor	31	(5)
2025–2026	→ Slavia Prague (loan)	15	(0)
2026–	→ Red Star Belgrade (loan)	10	(0)

International career^{‡}
2018	Austria U19	3	(0)
2021–2022	Austria U21	4	(0)
2022–	Austria	5	(0)
- * Club domestic league appearances and goals as of 26 October 2026 ‡ National team caps and goals as of 23 March 2025

Muhammed-Cham Saračević (born 26 September 2000) is an Austrian professional footballer who plays as an attacking midfielder for Serbian SuperLiga club Red Star Belgrade on loan from Trabzonspor and the Austria national team.

== Club career ==
Cham began his career at SC Red Star Penzing. In October 2008 he left Austria. Until 2016 he then played in Germany in the youth team of Hannover 96. For the 2016–17 season he moved to the B-Juniors of VfL Wolfsburg, where he made 22 appearances in the B-Junioren-Bundesliga in that season.

In August 2017, he played against Hertha BSC for the first time for the U-19 team in the A-Junior Bundesliga. In the 2017–18 season he played 15 games in which he scored three goals. In the 2018–19 season he made 22 appearances and became champions of the Gruppe Nord/Nordost with Wolfsburg. Therefore, he took part in the finals with Wolfsburg, which they lost to VfB Stuttgart.

For the 2019–20 season, Cham was promoted to the Wolfsburg's second team, VfL Wolfsburg II. He made his debut for them in the Regionalliga in July 2019 when he came on as a substitute for Julian Justvan in the 80th minute on the second match day of that season against BSV Schwarz-Weiß Rehden. After three appearances for Wolfsburg II, he returned to Austria in September 2019 and moved to Bundesliga club FC Admira Wacker Mödling.

He made his Austrian Football Bundesliga debut in the same month when he was in the starting line-up against SKN St. Pölten on matchday eight of that season and was replaced by Erwin Hoffer in the 65th minute. He made a total of 18 Bundesliga appearances for Admira. On 6 October 2020, he moved to France to the second division club Clermont, who however directly loaned him to the Danish 1st Division club Vendsyssel for the 2020–21 season.

On 13 July 2021, he returned to Austria, joining Austria Lustenau on a season-long loan.

On 13 September 2024, he signed a four-year contract with the option of a further year with Süper Lig club Trabzonspor.

On 30 August 2025, Cham joined Czech First League club Slavia Prague on a one-year loan deal with an option to make transfer permanent.

On 9 June 2026, Cham joined Serbian SuperLiga club Red Star Belgrade on a one-year loan deal with an option to make transfer permanent.

== International career ==
Cham was born in Austria, and is of paternal Senegalese and maternal Gambian descent. He bears his stepfather’s surname Saračević, who is from Bosnia-Herzegovina. He was called up to the Austria national team for a set of UEFA Nations League matches in September 2022. He made his debut on 25 September 2022 in a Nations League game against Croatia.

== Career statistics ==
=== Club ===
As of match played 15 October 2026

Appearances and goals by club, season and competition
Club	Season	League			National cup (Note: Includes Austrian Cup, Danish Cup, Coupe de France, Turkish Cup, Czech Cup)		Other		Total	
Club	Season	Division	Apps	Goals	Apps	Goals	Apps	Goals	Apps	Goals
VfL Wolfsburg II	2019–20	Regionalliga Nord	3	0	0	0	—		3	0
Admira Wacker	2019–20	Austrian Bundesliga	16	0	1	0	—		17	0
Admira Wacker	2020–21	Austrian Bundesliga	2	0	1	0	—		3	0
Admira Wacker	Total		18	0	2	0	—		20	0
Vendsyssel (loan)	2020–21	Danish 1st Division	22	0	1	0	—		23	0
Austria Lustenau (loan)	2021–22	2. Liga	29	15	2	0	—		31	15
Clermont	2022–23	Ligue 1	38	7	1	0	—		39	7
Clermont	2023–24	Ligue 1	33	8	2	0	—		35	8
Clermont	Total		71	15	3	0	—		74	15
Trabzonspor	2024–25	Süper Lig	31	5	6	1	—		37	6
Trabzonspor	2024–25	Süper Lig	1	0	0	0	—		1	0
Trabzonspor	Total		32	5	6	1	—		38	6
Slavia Prague (loan)	2025–26	Czech First League	15	0	3	0	5 (Note: Appearances in UEFA Champions League)	0	23	0
Red Star Belgrade (loan)	2026–27	Serbian SuperLiga	7	0	0	0	7 (Note: Four appearances and one goal in UEFA Champions League, two appearances in UEFA Europa League, one appearance in UEFA Conference League)	1	14	1
Career total			195	35	17	1	13	1	225	37

=== International ===
As of match played 23 March 2025

Appearances and goals by national team and year
National team	Year	Apps	Goals
Austria	2022	1	0
Austria	2023	1	0
Austria	2024	1	0
Austria	2025	2	0
Total		5	0

== Honours ==
Austria Lustenau

- 2. Liga (Austria): 2021–22

Slavia Prague

- Czech First League: 2025–26
