= Elbasan Rashani =

Footballer (born 1993)

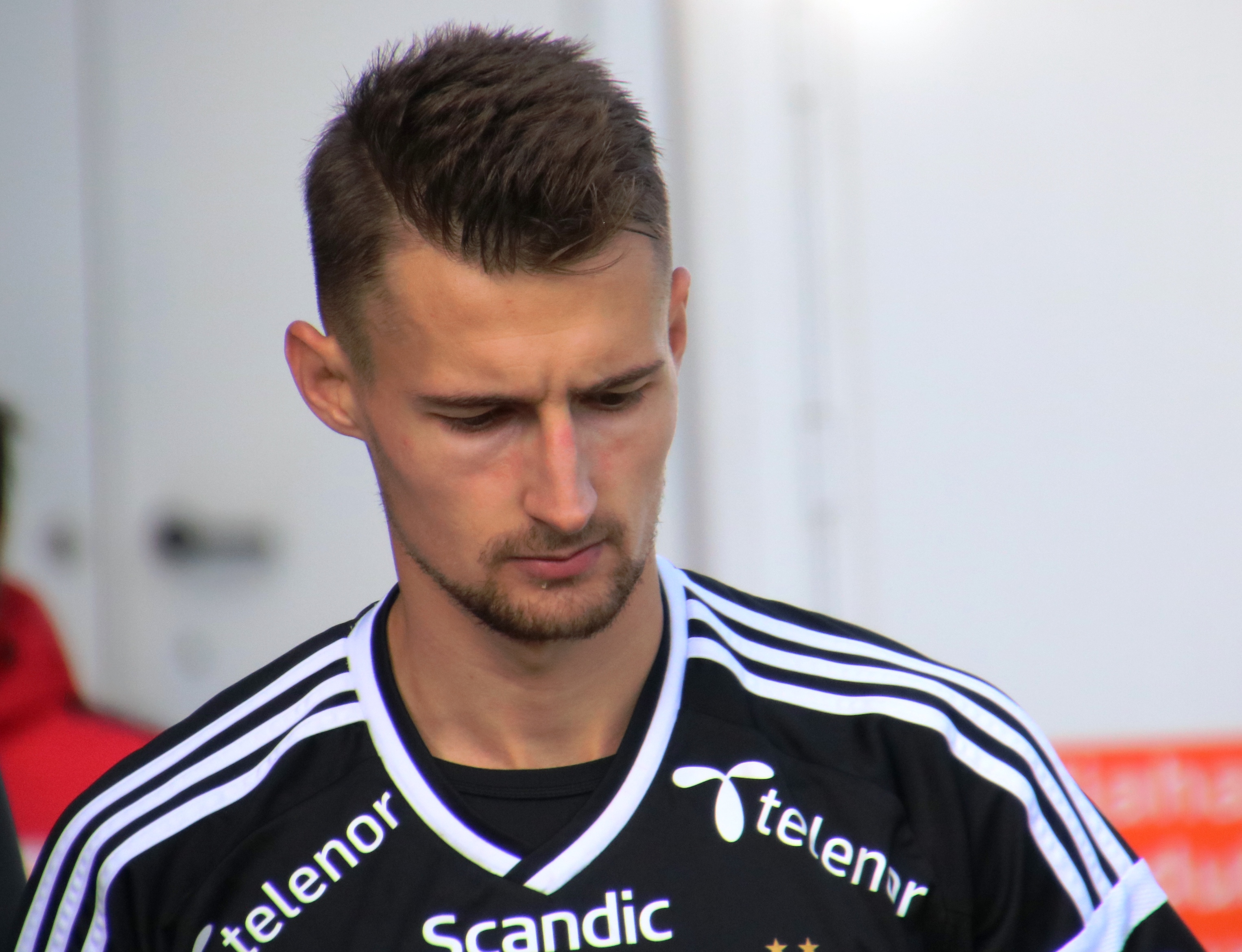
- Rashani with Rosenborg in 2017

Personal information
- Date of birth: 9 May 1993 (age 33)
- Place of birth: Värnamo, Sweden
- Height: 1.81 m (5 ft 11 in)
- Position: Left winger

Team information
- Current team: Vålerenga
- Number: 19

Youth career
- –2009: Skarphedin

Senior career*
| Years | Team | Apps | (Gls) |
| 2010–2014 | Odd | 69 | (7) |
| 2014–2016 | Brøndby | 24 | (3) |
| 2016 | → Rosenborg (loan) | 19 | (3) |
| 2017 | Rosenborg | 8 | (0) |
| 2017–2020 | Odd | 93 | (15) |
| 2021 | BB Erzurumspor | 12 | (3) |
| 2021–2024 | Clermont | 85 | (13) |
| 2024–2025 | Elche | 11 | (3) |
| 2025–2026 | Melbourne City | 12 | (1) |
| 2026– | Vålerenga | 0 | (0) |

International career
| 2010 | Norway U17 | 3 | (1) |
| 2011–2012 | Norway U18 | 12 | (0) |
| 2012–2013 | Norway U19 | 7 | (0) |
| 2012 | Norway U20 | 2 | (0) |
| 2013–2015 | Norway U21 | 9 | (2) |
| 2015–2024 | Kosovo | 29 | (5) |
- * Club domestic league appearances and goals as of 11 September 2026

Elbasan "Elba" Rashani (Albanian: [ɛlˈbasan ɾaˈʃani]; born 9 May 1993) is a professional footballer who plays as a left winger for Eliteserien club Vålerenga. Born in Sweden and raised in Norway, he represented Norway at youth international levels but in 2015 switched to play for Kosovo national team at senior level.

== Club career ==
=== Brøndby ===
On 24 July 2014, Rashani signed a four-year contract with Danish Superliga club Brøndby and received squad number 14. Brøndby reportedly paid a 4.9 million Danish krone transfer fee. Seven days later, he made his debut with Brøndby in the 2014–15 UEFA Europa League third qualifying round against Club Brugge after coming on as a substitute at 76th minute in place of Mikkel Thygesen.

=== Rosenborg ===
==== 2016 season as loan ====
On 11 January 2016, Rashani joined Tippeligaen side Rosenborg, on a season-long loan. Two days later, he made his debut in a 1–0 away defeat against Odd after being named in the starting line-up.

==== 2017 season ====
On 18 November 2016, Rashani returned and signed a two-year contract with Eliteserien club Rosenborg and this transfer would become legally effective in January 2017. On 23 March 2017, he made his debut with Odd in the 2017 Mesterfinalen against Brann after being named in the starting line-up.

=== Return to Odd ===
On 4 August 2017, Rashani signed a three-and-a-half-year contract with Eliteserien club Odd and received squad number 11. Two days later, he made his debut in a 2–1 home win against Sogndal after being named in the starting line-up.

=== BB Erzurumspor ===
On 24 January 2021, Rashani signed a one-and-a-half-year contract with Süper Lig club BB Erzurumspor. Three days later, he made his debut in a 2–0 away defeat against Galatasaray after coming on as a substitute at 46th minute in place of Rahman Buğra Çağıran.

=== Clermont ===
On 16 July 2021, Rashani signed a two-year contract with Ligue 1 club Clermont. On 8 August 2021, he made his debut against Bordeaux after coming on as a substitute at 78th minute in place of Jim Allevinah and assists in his side's first goal during a 0–2 away win. Fourteen days after his debut, Rashani scored his first goals for Clermont in his third appearance for the club in the 3–3 away draw against Lyon in Ligue 1. On 4 July 2022, Rashani signed a contract extension with Clermont until 2025.

=== Elche ===
On 30 August 2024, Rashani moved to Spanish Segunda División side Elche.

=== Melbourne City FC ===
On 12 September 2025, Rashani was signed by Australian A-League side Melbourne City. On the 21st of October, he scored his first goal for the club, an equaliser in the champions league game against Thai club Buriram United. Melbourne City went on to win the game 2-1.

== International career ==
From 2010 to 2015, Rashani represented Norway at youth international level, being part of the U17, U18, U19, U20 and U21 teams and he with these teams played 33 matches and scored three goals. On 10 November 2015, he received a call-up from Kosovo for a friendly match against Albania, Rashani made his debut after coming on as a substitute at 67th minute in place of Mërgim Brahimi and scored his side's second goal during a 2–2 home draw.

== Personal life ==
Rashani was born in Värnamo, Sweden from Kosovo Albanian parents from Vushtrri, but grew up in Kragerø and Bø in Norway.

== Career statistics ==
=== Club ===
As of match played 18 January 2025

Appearances and goals by club, season and competition
| Club | Season | League | | | Cup | | Continental | | Other | | Total | |
| Club | Season | Division | Apps | Goals | Apps | Goals | Apps | Goals | Apps | Goals | Apps | Goals |
|---|---|---|---|---|---|---|---|---|---|---|---|---|
| Odd | 2010 | Tippeligaen | 1 | 0 | 1 | 0 | — | | — | | 2 | 0 |
| Odd | 2011 | Tippeligaen | 16 | 0 | 1 | 0 | — | | — | | 17 | 0 |
| Odd | 2012 | Tippeligaen | 16 | 1 | 2 | 2 | — | | — | | 18 | 3 |
| Odd | 2013 | Tippeligaen | 21 | 2 | 4 | 2 | — | | — | | 25 | 4 |
| Odd | 2014 | Tippeligaen | 15 | 4 | 2 | 0 | — | | — | | 17 | 4 |
| Odd | Total | | 69 | 7 | 10 | 4 | — | | — | | 79 | 11 |
| Brøndby | 2014–15 | Danish Superliga | 14 | 2 | 0 | 0 | 2 (Note: Appearances in the UEFA Europa League) | 0 | — | | 16 | 2 |
| Brøndby | 2015–16 | Danish Superliga | 10 | 1 | 1 | 0 | 7 | 4 | — | | 18 | 5 |
| Brøndby | Total | | 24 | 3 | 1 | 0 | 9 | 4 | — | | 34 | 7 |
| Rosenborg (loan) | 2016 | Tippeligaen | 19 | 3 | 6 | 1 | 3 (Note: One appearance in the UEFA Champions League, two appearances in the UEFA Europa League) | 0 | — | | 28 | 4 |
| Rosenborg | 2017 | Eliteserien | 8 | 0 | 1 | 1 | 2 (Note: Appearances in the UEFA Champions League) | 0 | 1 (Note: Appearance in Mesterfinalen) | 0 | 12 | 1 |
| Odd | 2017 | Eliteserien | 13 | 2 | 0 | 0 | — | | — | | 13 | 2 |
| Odd | 2018 | Eliteserien | 27 | 7 | 4 | 2 | — | | — | | 31 | 9 |
| Odd | 2019 | Eliteserien | 29 | 3 | 6 | 0 | — | | — | | 35 | 3 |
| Odd | 2020 | Eliteserien | 24 | 3 | 0 | 0 | — | | — | | 24 | 3 |
| Odd | Total | | 93 | 15 | 10 | 2 | — | | — | | 103 | 17 |
| BB Erzurumspor | 2020–21 | Süper Lig | 12 | 3 | 0 | 0 | — | | — | | 12 | 3 |
| Clermont | 2021–22 | Ligue 1 | 29 | 8 | 2 | 0 | — | | — | | 31 | 8 |
| Clermont | 2022–23 | Ligue 1 | 32 | 3 | 0 | 0 | — | | — | | 32 | 3 |
| Clermont | 2023–24 | Ligue 1 | 24 | 2 | 1 | 0 | — | | — | | 25 | 2 |
| Clermont | Total | | 85 | 13 | 3 | 0 | — | | — | | 88 | 13 |
| Elche | 2024–25 | Segunda División | 6 | 2 | 1 | 0 | — | | — | | 7 | 2 |
| Career total | | | 316 | 46 | 32 | 8 | 14 | 4 | 1 | 0 | 363 | 58 |

=== International ===
Appearances and goals by national team and year
| National team | Year | Apps | Goals |
|---|---|---|---|
| Kosovo | 2015 | 1 | 1 |
| Kosovo | 2016 | 1 | 1 |
| Kosovo | 2017 | 2 | 1 |
| Kosovo | 2018 | 1 | 0 |
| Kosovo | 2019 | 6 | 1 |
| Kosovo | 2020 | 7 | 0 |
| Kosovo | 2021 | 4 | 0 |
| Kosovo | 2022 | 2 | 1 |
| Kosovo | 2023 | 3 | 0 |
| Kosovo | 2024 | 2 | 0 |
| Total | | 29 | 5 |

Scores and results list Kosovo's goal tally first, score column indicates score after each Rashani goal.

List of international goals scored by Elbasan Rashani
| No. | Date | Venue | Opponent | Score | Result | Competition | Ref. |
|---|---|---|---|---|---|---|---|
| 1 | 13 November 2015 | Pristina City Stadium, Pristina, Kosovo | Albania | 2–1 | 2–2 | Friendly | |
| 2 | 3 June 2016 | Stadion am Bornheimer Hang, Frankfurt, Germany | Faroe Islands | 2–0 | 2–0 | Friendly | |
| 3 | 13 November 2017 | Adem Jashari Olympic Stadium, Mitrovica, Kosovo | Latvia | 3–3 | 4–3 | Friendly | |
| 4 | 10 June 2019 | Vasil Levski National Stadium, Sofia, Bulgaria | Bulgaria | 3–2 | 3–2 | UEFA Euro 2020 qualifying | |
| 5 | 27 September 2022 | Fadil Vokrri Stadium, Pristina, Kosovo | Cyprus | 3–0 | 5–1 | 2022–23 UEFA Nations League C | |

== Honours ==
Rosenborg

- Eliteserien: 2016, 2017
- Norwegian Cup: 2016
- Mesterfinalen: 2017
