= Komnen Andrić =

Serbian footballer (born 1995)

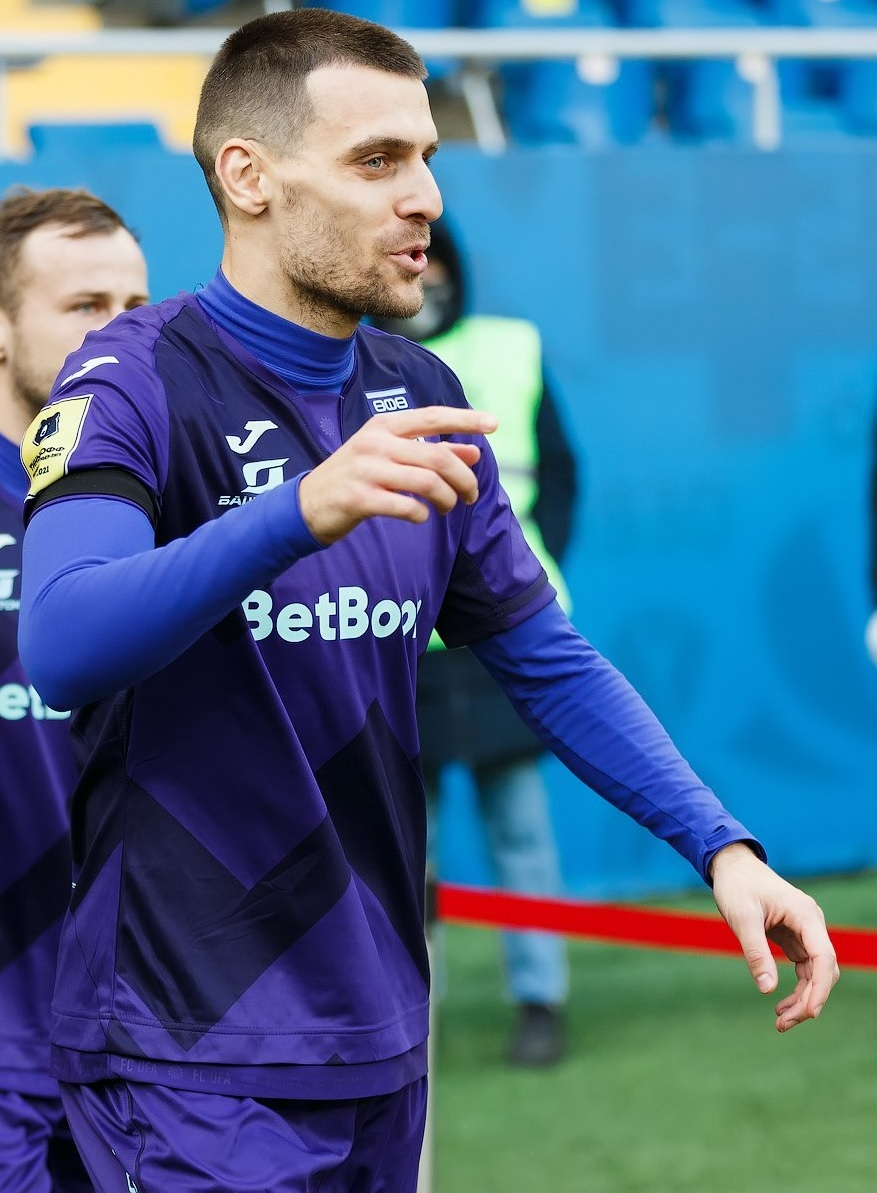
- Andrić with Ufa in 2020

Personal information
- Date of birth: 1 July 1995 (age 31)
- Place of birth: Baljevac na Ibru, Serbia, FR Yugoslavia
- Height: 1.89 m (6 ft 2 in)
- Position: Forward

Team information
- Current team: Torpedo Kutaisi (on loan from Rijeka)
- Number: 9

Youth career
- Rudar Baljevac
- Radnički Kragujevac

Senior career*
Years	Team	Apps	(Gls)
2013–2014	Radnički Kragujevac	23	(1)
2014–2016	OFK Beograd	39	(7)
2016–2017	Belenenses	8	(0)
2017	→ Žalgiris (loan)	8	(1)
2017–2019	Inter Zaprešić	34	(18)
2019–2022	Dinamo Zagreb	42	(12)
2019	Dinamo Zagreb II	1	(0)
2020	→ Inter Zaprešić (loan)	14	(3)
2020–2021	→ Ufa (loan)	16	(3)
2022–2024	Clermont	41	(4)
2024–	Rijeka	9	(1)
2025	→ Lokomotiva (loan)	15	(2)
2025–	→ Torpedo Kutaisi (loan)	41	(16)

International career
2015	Serbia U20	2	(1)
- * Club domestic league appearances and goals as of 1 September 2026

Komnen Andrić (Serbian Cyrillic: Комнен Андрић; born 1 July 1995) is a Serbian professional footballer who plays as a forward for Torpedo Kutaisi in Georgia on loan from Rijeka.

== Club career ==
=== Early career ===
On 27 February 2013, Andrić made his senior debut for Radnički Kragujevac in the Serbian SuperLiga, coming on as a substitute against Rad. On 17 August 2013, Andrić scored his first senior goal against Napredak Kruševac in a 2–1 win.

Andrić signed for Belenenses in the Primeira Liga in July 2016.

On 9 February 2017 he was loaned to Lithuanian A Lyga champions Žalgiris with a buy-out clause. Serb played only 9 times for Green Whites, scoring only once, so club decided not to use it and allow player to return to Belenenses on 30 June 2017.

=== Inter Zaprešić ===
On 31 August 2017, Andrić signed for Croatian club Inter Zaprešić. Over the course of two seasons with Inter Zaprešić, he became team captain under coach Samir Toplak. He was also the first Serbian captain in the history of the Croatian First Football League. He was the league's top scorer halfway into the 2018–19 season. In August 2018, he turned down an offer from Dinamo Zagreb.

=== Dinamo Zagreb ===
On 19 January 2019 he signed a five-year contract with Dinamo Zagreb in a €1 million transfer from Inter Zaprešić. He became the first Serbian footballer to play for Dinamo Zagreb since the breakup of Yugoslavia. On 24 February 2019, he scored his first goal for Dinamo Zagreb in a 3–0 win against Osijek.

On 16 October 2020, he joined Russian Premier League club Ufa on loan with an option to purchase. On 20 May 2021, Ufa announced that he will return to Dinamo Zagreb as his loan expired and Ufa decided not to exercise the option to purchase.

=== Clermont ===
On 15 July 2022, Andrić signed for French Ligue 1 side Clermont on a three-year deal with an option for extension.

=== Rijeka ===
On 7 August 2024, Andrić signed for Croatian side Rijeka on a two-year deal.

== Career statistics ==
=== Club ===
As of match played 6 December 2025

Appearances and goals by club, season and competition
Club	Season	League			National Cup (Note: Including Serbian Cup, Taça de Portugal, Lithuanian Cup, Croatian Cup, Russian Cup, Coupe de France)		League Cup (Note: Including Taça da Liga)		Europe		Other		Total	
Club	Season	Division	Apps	Goals	Apps	Goals	Apps	Goals	Apps	Goals	Apps	Goals	Apps	Goals
Radnički Kragujevac	2012–13	SuperLiga	5	0	0	0	—		—		—		5	0
Radnički Kragujevac	2013–14	SuperLiga	19	1	1	0	—		—		—		20	1
Radnički Kragujevac	Total		24	1	1	0	—		—		—		25	1
OFK Beograd	2014–15	SuperLiga	13	0	2	0	—		—		—		15	0
OFK Beograd	2015–16	SuperLiga	26	6	2	2	—		—		—		28	8
OFK Beograd	Total		39	6	4	2	—		—		—		43	8
Belenenses	2016–17	Primeira Liga	8	0	1	0	4	0	—		—		13	0
Žalgiris (loan)	2017	A Lyga	8	1	1	0	—		—		—		9	1
Inter Zaprešić (loan)	2017–18	SuperSport HNL	17	8	3	2	—		—		—		20	10
Inter Zaprešić	2018–19	SuperSport HNL	17	10	2	1	—		—		—		19	11
Inter Zaprešić	Total		34	18	5	3	—		—		—		39	21
Dinamo Zagreb	2019–20	SuperSport HNL	14	4	1	0	—		1 (Note: Appearance(s) in UEFA Europa League)	0	—		16	4
Dinamo Zagreb	2020–21	SuperSport HNL	3	2	1	2	—		—		—		4	4
Dinamo Zagreb	2021–22	SuperSport HNL	25	6	3	1	—		5	1	—		33	8
Dinamo Zagreb	Total		42	12	5	3	—		6	1	—		53	16
Inter Zaprešić (loan)	2019–20	SuperSport HNL	14	3	0	0	—		—		—		14	3
Ufa (loan)	2020–21	Premier Liga	16	3	3	2	—		—		—		19	5
Clermont	2022–23	Ligue 1	34	4	1	0	—		—		—		35	4
Clermont	2023–24	Ligue 1	7	0	0	0	—		—		—		7	0
Clermont	Total		41	4	1	0	—		—		—		42	4
Rijeka	2024–25	SuperSport HNL	9	1	2	1	—		2 (Note: Appearance(s) in UEFA Conference League)	0	—		13	2
Lokomotiva Zagreb (loan)	2024–25	SuperSport HNL	15	2	1	0	—		—		—		16	2
Torpedo Kutaisi (loan)	2025	Erovnuli Liga	18	7	—		4	0	—		—		22	7
Career total			268	58	24	11	8	0	8	1	—		308	70

== Honours ==
Zalgiris

- Lithuanian Supercup: 2017

Dinamo Zagreb

- 1. HNL: 2018–19
- Croatian Football Super Cup: 2019
