= Florent Ogier =

French footballer (born 1989)

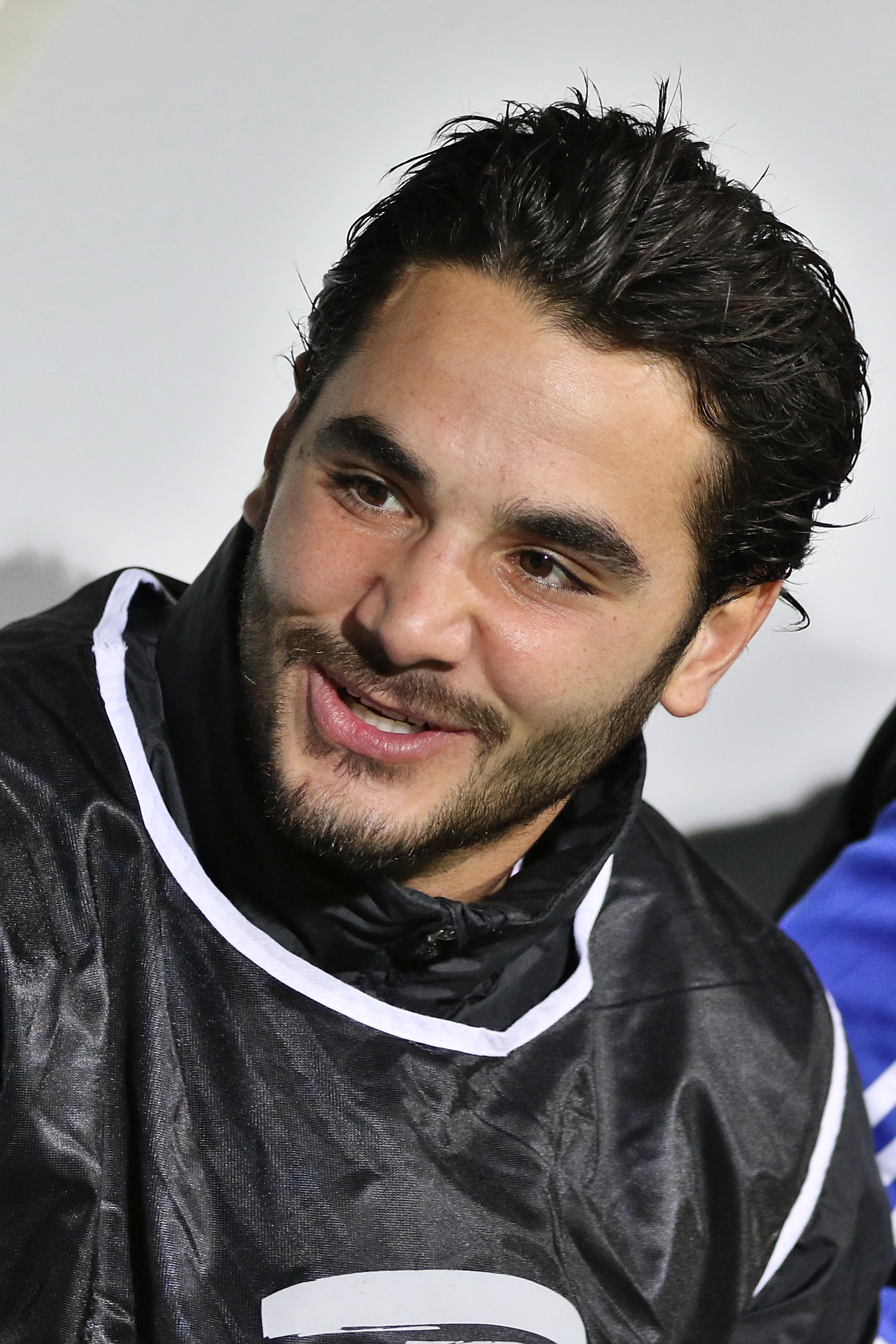
- Ogier with Bourg-Péronnas in 2015

Personal information
- Date of birth: 21 March 1989 (age 37)
- Place of birth: Lyon, France
- Height: 1.83 m (6 ft 0 in)
- Position: Centre-back

Team information
- Current team: Clermont B
- Number: 5

Youth career
- –2007: Lyon

Senior career*
| Years | Team | Apps | (Gls) |
| 2007–2009 | Grenoble B | | |
| 2009–2010 | Lyon Duchère | 31 | (1) |
| 2010–2013 | Dijon | 16 | (0) |
| 2011–2012 | → Racing Besançon (loan) | 33 | (0) |
| 2012 | Dijon B | 2 | (0) |
| 2013 | Paris FC | 16 | (1) |
| 2013–2014 | Le Poiré-sur-Vie | 19 | (2) |
| 2014 | Le Poiré-sur-Vie B | 9 | (0) |
| 2014–2016 | Bourg-en-Bresse | 57 | (3) |
| 2016–2018 | Sochaux | 68 | (1) |
| 2018–2024 | Clermont | 167 | (7) |
| 2024–2025 | Mohammedan | 18 | (0) |
| 2025– | Clermont B | 15 | (0) |
- * Club domestic league appearances and goals as of 15:25, 23 April 2026 (UTC)

Florent Ogier (born 21 March 1989) is a French professional footballer who plays as a defender for Clermont B.

He joined Sochaux on 27 May 2016 along with fellow former Bourg-en-Bresse defender Mickaël Alphonse.

== Career statistics ==
As of match played on 11 January 2026

Appearances and goals by club, season and competition
| Club | Season | League | | | National cup | | League cup | | Total | |
| Club | Season | Division | Apps | Goals | Apps | Goals | Apps | Goals | Apps | Goals |
|---|---|---|---|---|---|---|---|---|---|---|
| Lyon Duchère | 2009–10 | CFA | 31 | 1 | 0 | 0 | — | | 31 | 1 |
| Dijon | 2010–11 | Ligue 2 | 16 | 0 | 1 | 0 | 0 | 0 | 17 | 0 |
| Dijon | 2011–12 | Ligue 1 | 0 | 0 | 0 | 0 | 0 | 0 | 0 | 0 |
| Dijon | Total | | 16 | 0 | 1 | 0 | 0 | 0 | 17 | 0 |
| Racing Besançon (loan) | 2011–12 | National | 33 | 0 | 0 | 0 | — | | 33 | 0 |
| Dijon B | 2012–13 | CFA 2 | 2 | 0 | — | | — | | 2 | 0 |
| Paris FC | 2012–13 | National | 16 | 1 | 0 | 0 | — | | 16 | 1 |
| Le Poiré-sur-Vie | 2013–14 | National | 19 | 2 | 0 | 0 | — | | 19 | 2 |
| Le Poiré-sur-Vie B | 2013–14 | CFA 2 | 9 | 0 | — | | — | | 9 | 0 |
| Bourg-en-Bresse | 2014–15 | National | 29 | 1 | 0 | 0 | — | | 29 | 1 |
| Bourg-en-Bresse | 2015–16 | Ligue 2 | 28 | 2 | 2 | 1 | 2 | 0 | 32 | 3 |
| Bourg-en-Bresse | Total | | 57 | 3 | 2 | 1 | 2 | 0 | 61 | 4 |
| Sochaux | 2016–17 | Ligue 2 | 36 | 1 | 1 | 0 | 3 | 0 | 40 | 1 |
| Sochaux | 2017–18 | Ligue 2 | 32 | 0 | 5 | 0 | 1 | 0 | 38 | 0 |
| Sochaux | Total | | 68 | 1 | 6 | 0 | 4 | 0 | 78 | 1 |
| Clermont | 2018–19 | Ligue 2 | 35 | 3 | 3 | 0 | 1 | 1 | 39 | 4 |
| Clermont | 2019–20 | Ligue 2 | 24 | 2 | 1 | 0 | 2 | 0 | 27 | 2 |
| Clermont | 2020–21 | Ligue 2 | 38 | 0 | 0 | 0 | — | | 38 | 0 |
| Clermont | 2021–22 | Ligue 1 | 30 | 1 | 0 | 0 | — | | 30 | 1 |
| Clermont | 2022–23 | Ligue 1 | 26 | 0 | 1 | 0 | — | | 27 | 0 |
| Clermont | 2023–24 | Ligue 1 | 14 | 1 | 2 | 0 | — | | 16 | 1 |
| Clermont | Total | | 167 | 7 | 7 | 0 | 3 | 1 | 177 | 8 |
| Mohammedan | 2024–25 | Indian Super League | 18 | 0 | 0 | 0 | — | | 18 | 0 |
| Clermont B | 2025–26 | Régional 1 | 15 | 0 | 1 | 0 | — | | 16 | 0 |
| Career totals | | | 451 | 15 | 17 | 1 | 9 | 1 | 477 | 17 |
