= Mateusz Wieteska =

Polish footballer (born 1997)

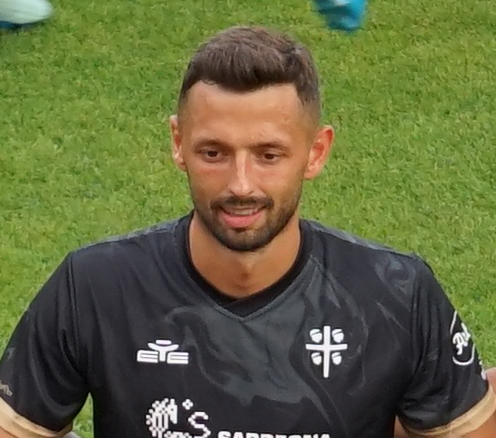
- Wieteska with Cagliari in 2024

Personal information
- Full name: Mateusz Wieteska
- Date of birth: 11 February 1997 (age 29)
- Place of birth: Warsaw, Poland
- Height: 1.87 m (6 ft 2 in)
- Position: Centre-back

Team information
- Current team: Wieczysta Kraków
- Number: 24

Youth career
- –2010: Pogoń Grodzisk Mazowiecki
- 2010–2014: Legia Warsaw

Senior career*
Years	Team	Apps	(Gls)
2014–2016	Legia Warsaw II	46	(5)
2014–2017	Legia Warsaw	4	(0)
2015	→ Dolcan Ząbki (loan)	8	(1)
2017	→ Chrobry Głogów (loan)	14	(3)
2017–2018	Górnik Zabrze	35	(7)
2018–2022	Legia Warsaw	105	(6)
2020	→ Legia Warsaw II	1	(0)
2022–2023	Clermont	37	(1)
2023–2026	Cagliari	24	(0)
2025	→ PAOK (loan)	10	(0)
2025–2026	→ Kocaelispor (loan)	1	(0)
2026–	Wieczysta Kraków	2	(1)

International career^{‡}
2011	Poland U15	4	(3)
2011–2013	Poland U16	4	(1)
2011–2012	Poland U17	12	(2)
2014	Poland U18	2	(0)
2014–2016	Poland U19	20	(2)
2016–2017	Poland U20	8	(1)
2017–2019	Poland U21	17	(2)
2022–	Poland	6	(0)
- * Club domestic league appearances and goals as of 20:32, 23 August 2025 (UTC) ‡ National team caps and goals as of 24 March 2025

Mateusz Wieteska (born 11 February 1997) is a Polish professional footballer who plays as a centre-back for Ekstraklasa club Wieczysta Kraków.

== Club career ==
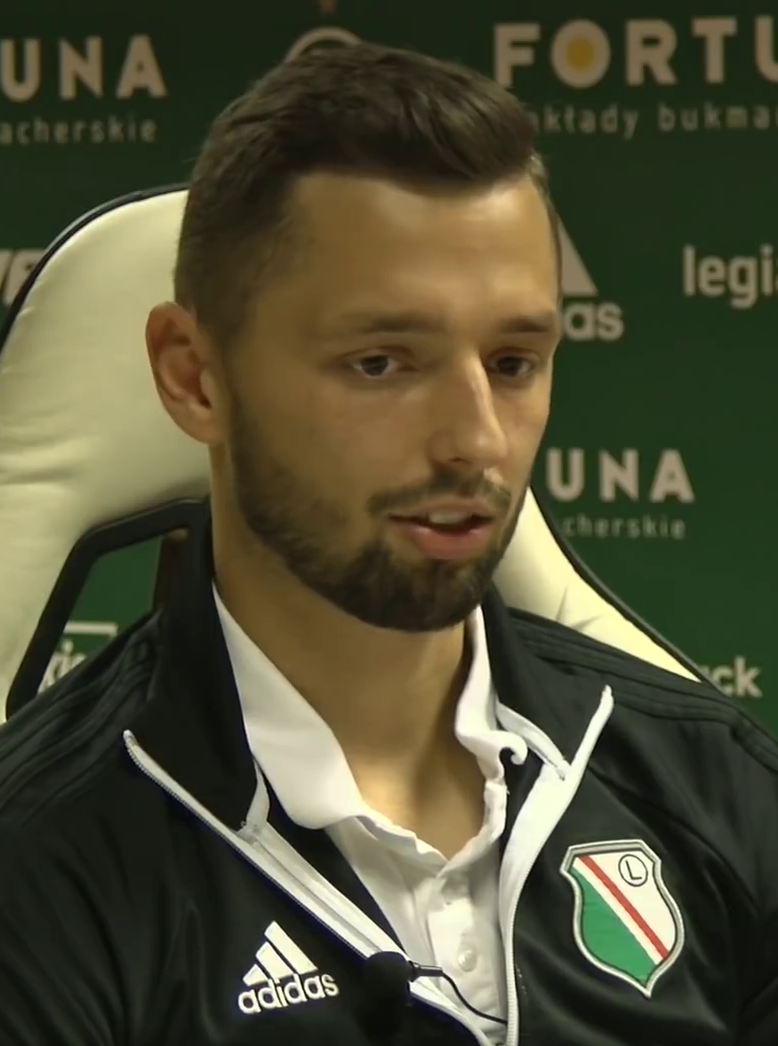
Wieteska with Legia Warsaw in 2018

On 7 July 2017, Wieteska signed a contract with Ekstraklasa side Górnik Zabrze. On 14 June 2018, his move to Legia Warsaw was announced.

On 25 July 2022, Ligue 1 club Clermont announced the signing of Wieteska, who joined the French side on a four-year contract.

On 29 August 2023, Wieteska moved to Serie A returnees Cagliari on a four-year deal.

On 22 January 2025, Wieteska joined Greek club PAOK on loan until the end of the season with an option to make the move permanent. On 30 July 2025, he was loaned by Kocaelispor in Turkey, with an option to buy. On 11 August 2025, while making his debut against Trabzonspor, Wieteska suffered an ACL tear in his right knee.

On 31 July 2026, Wieteska returned to Poland to join Ekstraklasa newcomers Wieczysta Kraków; he signed a one-year contract with an option for another year.

== International career ==
On 15 March 2022, Wieteska was called up by the Poland national team head coach Czesław Michniewicz for the friendly match against Scotland and the 2022 FIFA World Cup play-offs final against Sweden.

On 14 June 2022, he debuted for Poland as a starter against Belgium in a 2022–23 UEFA Nations League game.

In September 2022, Wieteska was named in the final Polish 26-man squad for the 2022 FIFA World Cup, but did not play in any match of the tournament.

== Career statistics ==
=== Club ===
As of match played 11 August 2025

Appearances and goals by club, season and competition
Club	Season	League			National cup (Note: Includes Polish Cup, Coppa Italia)		Continental		Other		Total	
Club	Season	Division	Apps	Goals	Apps	Goals	Apps	Goals	Apps	Goals	Apps	Goals
Legia Warsaw	2014–15	Ekstraklasa	2	0	0	0	0	0	1 (Note: Appearance in Polish Super Cup)	0	3	0
Legia Warsaw	2016–17	Ekstraklasa	2	0	0	0	1 (Note: Appearance in UEFA Champions League)	0	—		3	0
Legia Warsaw	Total		4	0	0	0	1	0	1	0	6	0
Dolcan Ząbki (loan)	2015–16	I liga	8	1	0	0	—		—		8	1
Chrobry Głogów (loan)	2016–17	I liga	14	3	—		—		—		14	3
Górnik Zabrze	2017–18	Ekstraklasa	35	7	7	0	—		—		42	7
Legia Warsaw	2018–19	Ekstraklasa	27	0	1	0	6 (Note: Four appearances in UEFA Champions League, two appearances in UEFA Europa League)	0	1	0	35	0
Legia Warsaw	2019–20	Ekstraklasa	28	1	5	1	4 (Note: Appearances in UEFA Europa League)	1	—		37	3
Legia Warsaw	2020–21	Ekstraklasa	18	1	4	0	3 (Note: Two appearances in UEFA Champions League, one appearance in UEFA Europa League)	0	1	0	26	1
Legia Warsaw	2021–22	Ekstraklasa	30	4	4	0	14 (Note: Six appearances in UEFA Champions League, eight appearances in UEFA Europa League)	0	1	0	49	4
Legia Warsaw	2022–23	Ekstraklasa	2	0	0	0	—		0	0	2	0
Legia Warsaw	Total		105	6	14	1	27	1	3	0	149	8
Clermont	2022–23	Ligue 1	35	0	0	0	—		—		35	0
Clermont	2023–24	Ligue 1	2	1	0	0	—		—		2	1
Clermont	Total		37	1	0	0	—		—		37	1
Cagliari	2023–24	Serie A	19	0	2	0	—		—		21	0
Cagliari	2024–25	Serie A	5	0	2	0	—		—		7	0
Cagliari	Total		24	0	4	0	—		—		28	0
PAOK (loan)	2024–25	Super League Greece	10	0	—		—		—		10	0
Kocaelispor (loan)	2025–26	Süper Lig	1	0	0	0	—		—		1	0
Wieczysta Kraków	2026–27	Ekstraklasa	0	0	0	0	—		—		0	0
Career total			238	18	25	1	28	1	4	0	295	20

=== International ===
As of match played 24 March 2025

Appearances and goals by national team and year
National team	Year	Apps	Goals
Poland	2022	2	0
Poland	2023	2	0
Poland	2025	2	0
Total		6	0

== Honours ==
Legia Warsaw

- Ekstraklasa: 2016–17, 2019–20, 2020–21

Individual

- I liga Team of the Season: 2016–17
