= Alidu Seidu =

Ghanaian footballer (born 2000)

Personal information
- Full name: Alidu Seidu
- Date of birth: 4 June 2000 (age 26)
- Place of birth: Kumasi, Ghana
- Height: 1.73 m (5 ft 8 in)
- Position: Defender

Team information
- Current team: Nice (on loan from Rennes)
- Number: 36

Youth career
- JMG Academy

Senior career*
Years	Team	Apps	(Gls)
2019–2021	Clermont II	10	(0)
2020–2024	Clermont	72	(0)
2024–	Rennes	43	(0)
2026–	→ Nice (loan)	2	(0)

International career^{‡}
2022–	Ghana	25	(1)
- * Club domestic league appearances and goals as of 18 October 2026 ‡ National team caps and goals as of 4 July 2026

Alidu Seidu (born 4 June 2000) is a Ghanaian professional footballer who plays as a defender for Ligue 1 club Nice, on loan from Rennes, and the Ghana national team.

== Club career ==
On 1 June 2019, Seidu joined Clermont Foot from the JMG Academy. He made his debut with Clermont in a 1–1 Ligue 2 draw with Toulouse FC on 19 September 2020.

On 29 January 2024, Seidu signed a contract with Rennes until 2028.

== International career ==
In May 2022, Seidu received his first call-up to the Ghana national team by head coach Otto Addo. He made his senior international debut on 10 June 2022 in a friendly match against Japan, starting as Ghana suffered a 4–1 defeat.

On 14 November 2022, Seidu was named in Otto Addo's squad for the 2022 FIFA World Cup in Qatar. He made his World Cup debut on 24 November in Ghana's opening match against Portugal.

On 31 December 2023, he was named in Chris Hughton's 27-man squad for the 2023 Africa Cup of Nations in Ivory Coast.

On 2 June 2026, Seidu was named in head coach Carlos Queiroz's 26-man squad for the 2026 FIFA World Cup.

== Career statistics ==
=== Club ===
As of match played 18 October 2026

Appearances and goals by club, season and competition
Club	Season	League			Coupe de France		Europe		Other		Total	
Club	Season	Division	Apps	Goals	Apps	Goals	Apps	Goals	Apps	Goals	Apps	Goals
Clermont II	2019–20	CFA 2	6	0	—		—		—		6	0
Clermont II	2020–21	CFA 2	2	0	—		—		—		2	0
Clermont II	2021–22	CFA 2	2	0	—		—		—		2	0
Clermont II	Total		10	0	—		—		—		10	0
Clermont	2020–21	Ligue 2	22	0	1	0	—		—		23	0
Clermont	2021–22	Ligue 1	21	0	2	0	—		—		23	0
Clermont	2022–23	Ligue 1	28	0	1	0	—		—		29	0
Clermont	2023–24	Ligue 1	14	0	0	0	—		—		14	0
Clermont	Total		85	0	4	0	—		—		89	0
Rennes	2023–24	Ligue 1	11	0	2	0	2 (Note: Appearances in UEFA Europa League)	0	—		16	0
Rennes	2024–25	Ligue 1	11	0	0	0	—		—		11	0
Rennes	2025–26	Ligue 1	21	0	3	0	—		—		24	0
Rennes	Total		43	0	5	0	2	0	—		50	0
Nice (loan)	2026–27	Ligue 1	2	0	0	0	—		—		2	0
Career total			140	0	9	0	2	0	0	0	151	0

=== International ===
As of match played 4 July 2026

Appearances and goals by national team and year
National team	Year	Apps	Goals
Ghana	2022	6	0
Ghana	2023	4	0
Ghana	2024	10	1
Ghana	2025	3	0
Ghana	2026	2	0
Total		25	1

Scores and results list Ghana's goal tally first, score column indicates score after each Seidu goal.

List of international goals scored by Alidu Seidu
No.	Date	Venue	Opponent	Score	Result	Competition
1	9 September 2024	Berkane Municipal Stadium, Berkane, Morocco	Niger	1–0	1–1	2025 Africa Cup of Nations qualification
