= Maximiliano Caufriez =

Belgian footballer (born 1997)

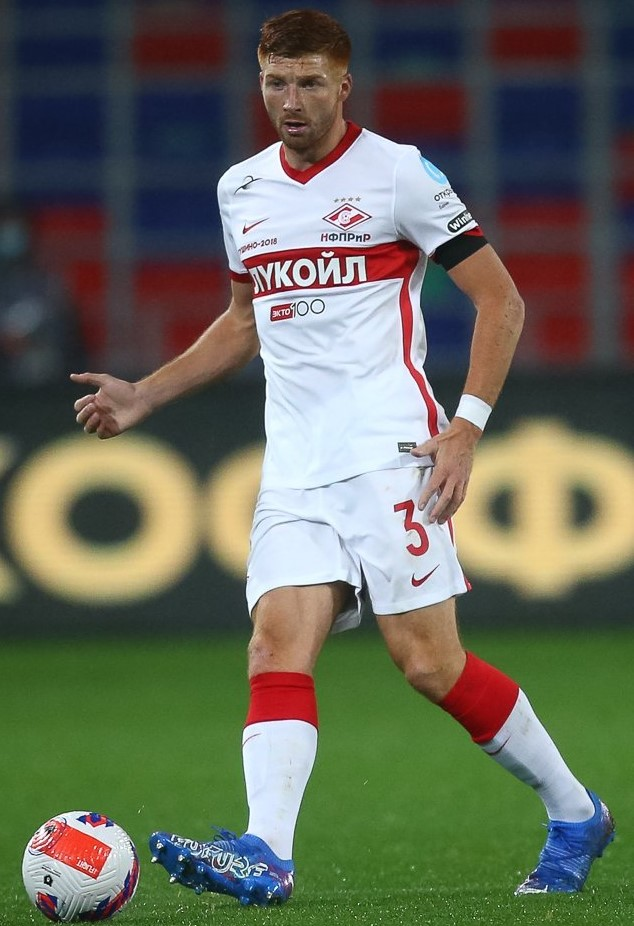
- Caufriez with Spartak Moscow in 2021

Personal information
- Date of birth: 16 February 1997 (age 29)
- Place of birth: Mons, Belgium
- Height: 1.89 m (6 ft 2 in)
- Positions: Centre-back; right-back

Youth career
- –2008: Mons
- 2008–2012: Anderlecht
- 2012–2015: Standard Liège
- 2015–2016: Waasland-Beveren

Senior career*
Years	Team	Apps	(Gls)
2015–2020	Waasland-Beveren	73	(1)
2020–2021	Sint-Truidense	24	(1)
2021–2023	Spartak Moscow	18	(0)
2022–2023	→ Clermont (loan)	26	(1)
2023–2026	Clermont	39	(0)
2024–2025	→ Valencia (loan)	1	(0)
2025	→ Red Bull Salzburg (loan)	4	(0)

International career
2015	Belgium U18	3	(0)
2015–2016	Belgium U19	8	(0)
2018	Belgium U21	6	(0)
- * Club domestic league appearances and goals as of 12 May 2026

Maximiliano Caufriez (born 16 February 1997) is a Belgian professional footballer who plays as a centre-back and right-back.

== Club career ==
Caufriez was born and raised in Mons where he started to play as a youth. Later, he joined Waasland-Beveren. He made his Belgian Pro League debut on 4 April 2016 against Mouscron.

On 29 August 2021, he signed a long-term contract with Russian Premier League club Spartak Moscow. On 29 May 2022, he won the Russian Cup after almost a decade of unsuccessful runs for Spartak in the competition.

On 29 August 2022, Caufriez joined Ligue 1 club Clermont on loan for the 2022–23 season. On 27 June 2023, Clemont purchased his rights from Spartak, making the transfer permanent.

On 29 August 2024, after suffering relegation, Caufriez was loaned to La Liga side Valencia. On 27 January 2025, he moved on a new loan to Red Bull Salzburg in Austria.

== Personal life ==
Morocco national team player Selim Amallah is his cousin from the maternal line.

== Career statistics ==
As of match played 20 April 2025

Appearances and goals by club, season and competition
Club	Season	League			Cup		Continental		Other		Total	
Club	Season	Division	Apps	Goals	Apps	Goals	Apps	Goals	Apps	Goals	Apps	Goals
Waasland-Beveren	2015–16	Belgian First Division A	0	0	0	0	—		4 (Note: Appearances in the Europa League play-offs)	1	4	1
Waasland-Beveren	2016–17	Belgian First Division A	0	0	0	0	—		5	0	5	0
Waasland-Beveren	2017–18	Belgian First Division A	17	0	1	0	—		7	0	25	0
Waasland-Beveren	2018–19	Belgian First Division A	23	1	0	0	—		8	0	31	1
Waasland-Beveren	2019–20	Belgian First Division A	29	0	1	0	—		—		30	0
Waasland-Beveren	2020–21	Belgian First Division A	4	0	—		—		—		4	0
Waasland-Beveren	Total		73	1	2	0	—		24	1	99	2
Sint-Truiden	2020–21	Belgian First Division A	19	1	1	0	—		—		20	1
Sint-Truiden	2021–22	Belgian First Division A	5	0	—		—		—		5	0
Sint-Truiden	Total		24	1	1	0	—		—		25	1
Spartak Moscow	2021–22	Russian Premier League	17	0	4	0	4 (Note: Appearances in the UEFA Europa League)	0	—		25	0
Spartak Moscow	2022–23	Russian Premier League	1	0	—		—		—		1	0
Spartak Moscow	Total		18	0	4	0	4	0	—		26	0
Clermont (loan)	2022–23	Ligue 1	26	1	1	0	—		—		27	1
Clermont	2023–24	Ligue 1	20	0	1	0	—		—		21	0
Valencia (loan)	2024–25	La Liga	1	0	0	0	—		—		1	0
Red Bull Salzburg (loan)	2024–25	Austrian Bundesliga	4	0	1	0	—		0	0	5	0
Career total			166	3	10	0	4	0	24	1	204	4

== Honours ==
Spartak Moscow

- Russian Cup: 2021–22
