= Cheick Oumar Konaté =

Malian footballer (born 2004)

Personal information
- Date of birth: 2 April 2004 (age 22)
- Place of birth: Bamako, Mali
- Height: 1.73 m (5 ft 8 in)
- Position: Defender

Team information
- Current team: Beveren
- Number: 25

Youth career
- 2019–2022: FC Guidars
- 2022–2023: Clermont

Senior career*
Years	Team	Apps	(Gls)
2023	Clermont B	3	(0)
2023–2026	Clermont	74	(1)
2026	→ A.E. Kifisia (loan)	16	(0)
2026–	Beveren	0	(0)

International career^{‡}
2024–	Mali	2	(0)
- * Club domestic league appearances and goals as of 14 June 2026 ‡ National team caps and goals as of 24 March 2025

Cheick Oumar Konaté (born 2 April 2004) is a Malian professional footballer who plays as a defender for Belgian Pro League club Beveren and the Mali national team.

== Career ==
Konaté is a youth product of the Malian club FC Guidars. On 13 October 2022, he signed a professional contract with the club until 2027. Officially a right-back, he started playing as a right-sided centre-back for the club in a back 3. He made his senior and professional debut with Clermont as a starter in a 2–0 Ligue 1 loss to Rennes on 19 February 2023.

On 4 September 2026, Konaté signed a two-season contract with Beveren in Belgium.

== Career statistics ==
=== Club ===
As of match played 29 August 2025

Appearances and goals by club, season and competition
Club	Season	League			National cup		Other		Total	
Club	Season	Division	Apps	Goals	Apps	Goals	Apps	Goals	Apps	Goals
Clermont B	2022–23	National 3	2	0	—		—		2	0
Clermont B	2023–24	National 3	1	0	—		—		1	0
Clermont B	Total		3	0	—		—		3	0
Clermont	2022–23	Ligue 1	9	0	0	0	—		9	0
Clermont	2023–24	Ligue 1	19	1	1	0	0	0	20	1
Clermont	2024–25	Ligue 2	30	0	1	0	2 (Note: Appearances in Ligue 1 relegation/promotion play-offs)	0	33	0
Clermont	2025–26	Ligue 2	2	0	0	0	0	0	2	0
Clermont	Total		60	1	2	0	2	0	64	1
Career total			63	1	3	0	2	0	68	1

=== International ===
As of matches played on 24 March 2025

Appearances and goals by national team and year
National team	Year	Apps	Goals
Mali	2024	1	0
Mali	2025	1	0
Total		2	0
