= Mehdi Zeffane =

Footballer (born 1992)

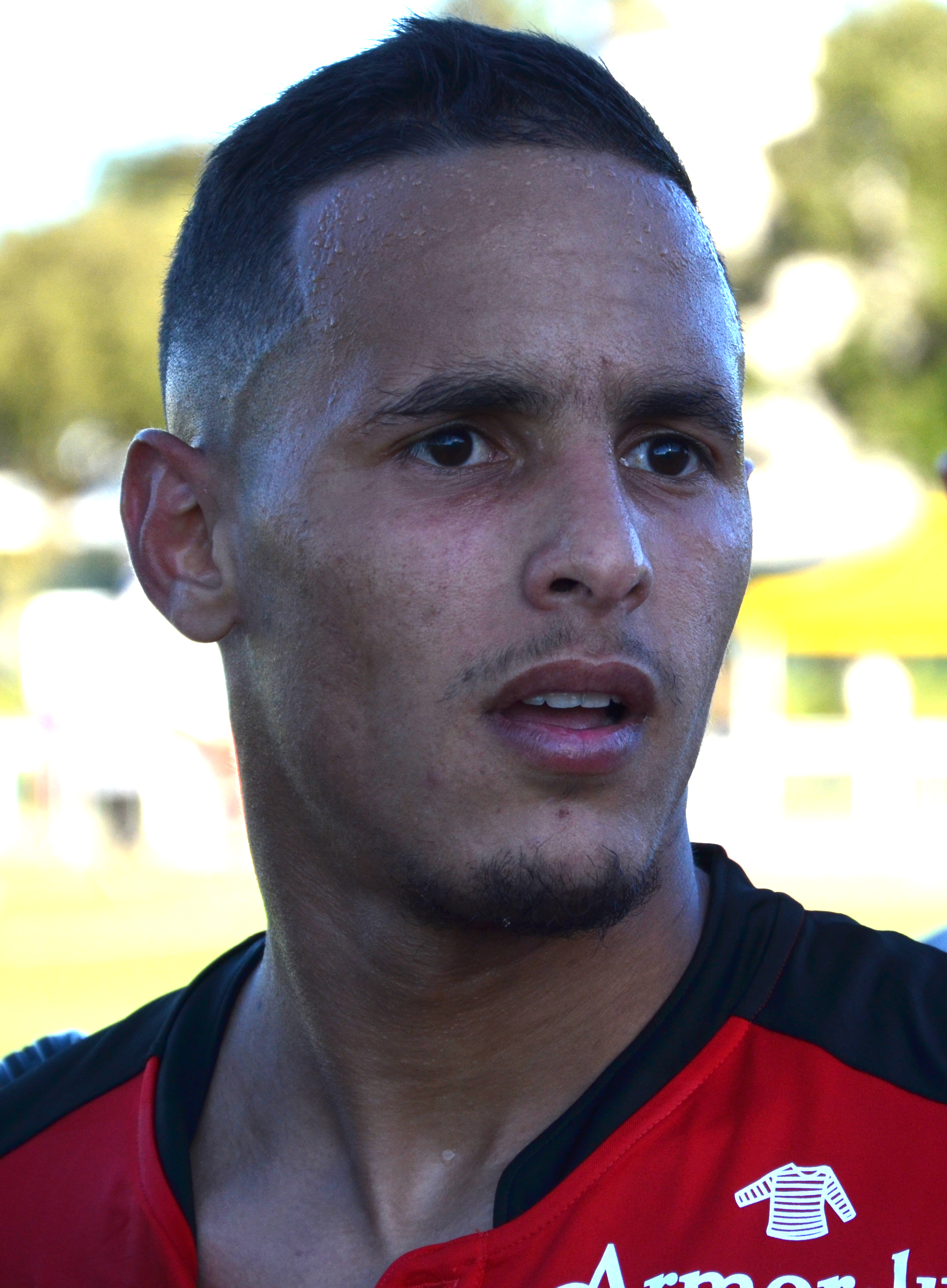
- Zeffane with Rennes in 2016

Personal information
- Full name: Mehdi Embareck Zeffane
- Date of birth: 19 May 1992 (age 34)
- Place of birth: Sainte-Foy-lès-Lyon, France
- Height: 1.76 m (5 ft 9 in)
- Position: Right-back

Youth career
- 2003–2012: Lyon

Senior career*
Years	Team	Apps	(Gls)
2010–2014	Lyon B	74	(1)
2012–2015	Lyon	12	(0)
2015–2019	Rennes	52	(2)
2016–2017	Rennes B	3	(0)
2020–2021	Krylia Sovetov Samara	45	(0)
2022	Yeni Malatyaspor	9	(0)
2022–2024	Clermont	41	(1)
2025–	ES Mostaganem	5	(0)

International career
2014–2021	Algeria	19	(1)
Medal record
Men's football
Representing Algeria
Africa Cup of Nations
Winner	2019 Egypt
- * Club domestic league appearances and goals as of 12 December 2025

Mehdi Embareck Zeffane (Arabic: مهدي مبارك زفان; born 19 May 1992) is a professional footballer who most recently played as a right-back for Ligue 2 club Clermont. Born in France, he played for the Algeria national team from 2014 to 2021.

== Club career ==
Born in Sainte-Foy-lès-Lyon, a commune in the Metropolis of Lyon, Zeffane made his debut for the Olympique Lyonnais B side on 21 August 2010 against RCO Agde at the Stade Louis Sanguin, in which he played the full 90 minutes, as Lyon's B team lost the match 1–0. He scored his first goal for the Lyon B team the next season on 13 August 2011 against FC Villefranche at the Stade Armand Chouffet, when he found the net in the 54th minute in what turned out to be Lyon B's last goal in a 6–0 rout over Villefranche.

In August 2015, Zeffane joined Ligue 1 club Rennes, signing a four-year contract with the club. On 22 August 2015, he scored the winning goal against his former side Lyon in a 2–1 away win for Rennes.

On 30 January 2020, Zeffane signed a two-year contract with Russian Premier League club Krylia Sovetov Samara.

On 14 January 2022, he joined Süper Lig club Yeni Malatyaspor on a one-and-a-half-year contract, with an option to extend for another year. He agreed the termination of his contract in April after the club failed to play his salary and that of teammates. He made nine appearances while Yeni Malatyaspor placed last in the league.

On 15 June 2022, Zeffane returned to France and signed a contract with Clermont for two years with an option for a third year.

On 28 August 2025, he joined ES Mostaganem. On 12 December 2025, he terminated his contract with ES Mostaganem team by mutual consent.

== International career ==
Born in France to Algerian parents, Zeffane was initially eligible to represent either France or Algeria. In August 2014, he was named in a provisional 31-man squad by new Algeria coach Christian Gourcuff for a pair of 2015 Africa Cup of Nations qualifiers against Ethiopia and Mali. Ten days later, he was included in the final squad for the matches.

On July 19, 2019, he won the 2019 Africa Cup of Nations under Djamel Belmadi.

== Career statistics ==
=== Club ===
As of match played 4 May 2024

Appearances and goals by club, season and competition
Club	Season	League			National cup		League cup		Continental		Total	
Club	Season	Division	Apps	Goals	Apps	Goals	Apps	Goals	Apps	Goals	Apps	Goals
Lyon B	2010–11	CFA	12	0	—		—		—		12	0
Lyon B	2011–12	CFA	26	1	—		—		—		26	1
Lyon B	2012–13	CFA	27	0	—		—		—		27	0
Lyon B	2013–14	CFA	8	0	—		—		—		8	0
Lyon B	2014–15	CFA	1	0	—		—		—		1	0
Lyon B			74	1	—		—		—		74	1
Lyon	2012–13	Ligue 1	0	0	0	0	0	0	1 (Note: Appearance(s) in the UEFA Europa League)	0	1	0
Lyon	2013–14	Ligue 1	8	0	2	0	2	0	5	0	17	0
Lyon	2014–15	Ligue 1	4	0	0	0	1	0	1	0	6	0
Lyon	Total		12	0	2	0	3	0	7	0	24	0
Rennes	2015–16	Ligue 1	16	1	0	0	2	0	—		18	1
Rennes	2016–17	Ligue 1	1	0	0	0	1	0	—		3	0
Rennes	2017–18	Ligue 1	15	0	0	0	0	0	—		15	0
Rennes	2018–19	Ligue 1	20	1	3	0	2	0	6	0	31	1
Rennes	Total		52	2	3	0	5	0	6	0	66	2
Rennes B	2016–17	CFA	3	0	—		—		—		3	0
Krylia Sovetov Samara	2019–20	Russian Premier League	6	0	0	0	—		—		6	0
Krylia Sovetov Samara	2020–21	Russian National League	24	0	5	0	—		—		29	0
Krylia Sovetov Samara	2021–22	Russian Premier League	15	0	0	0	—		—		15	0
Krylia Sovetov Samara	Total		45	0	5	0	—		—		50	0
Yeni Malatyaspor	2021–22	Süper Lig	9	0	0	0	—		—		9	0
Clermont	2022–23	Ligue 1	18	1	1	0	—		—		19	1
Clermont	2023–24	Ligue 1	23	0	2	1	—		—		25	1
Clermont	Total		41	1	3	1	—		—		44	2
Career total			236	4	13	1	8	0	13	0	270	5

=== International ===
As of match played 7 September 2021

Appearances and goals by national team and year
National team	Year	Apps	Goals
Algeria	2014	1	0
Algeria	2015	5	0
Algeria	2016	5	0
Algeria	2017	0	0
Algeria	2018	0	0
Algeria	2019	4	0
Algeria	2021	4	1
Total		19	1

== Honours ==
Rennes

- Coupe de France: 2018–19

Algeria

- Africa Cup of Nations: 2019
