= Johan Gastien =

French footballer (born 1988)

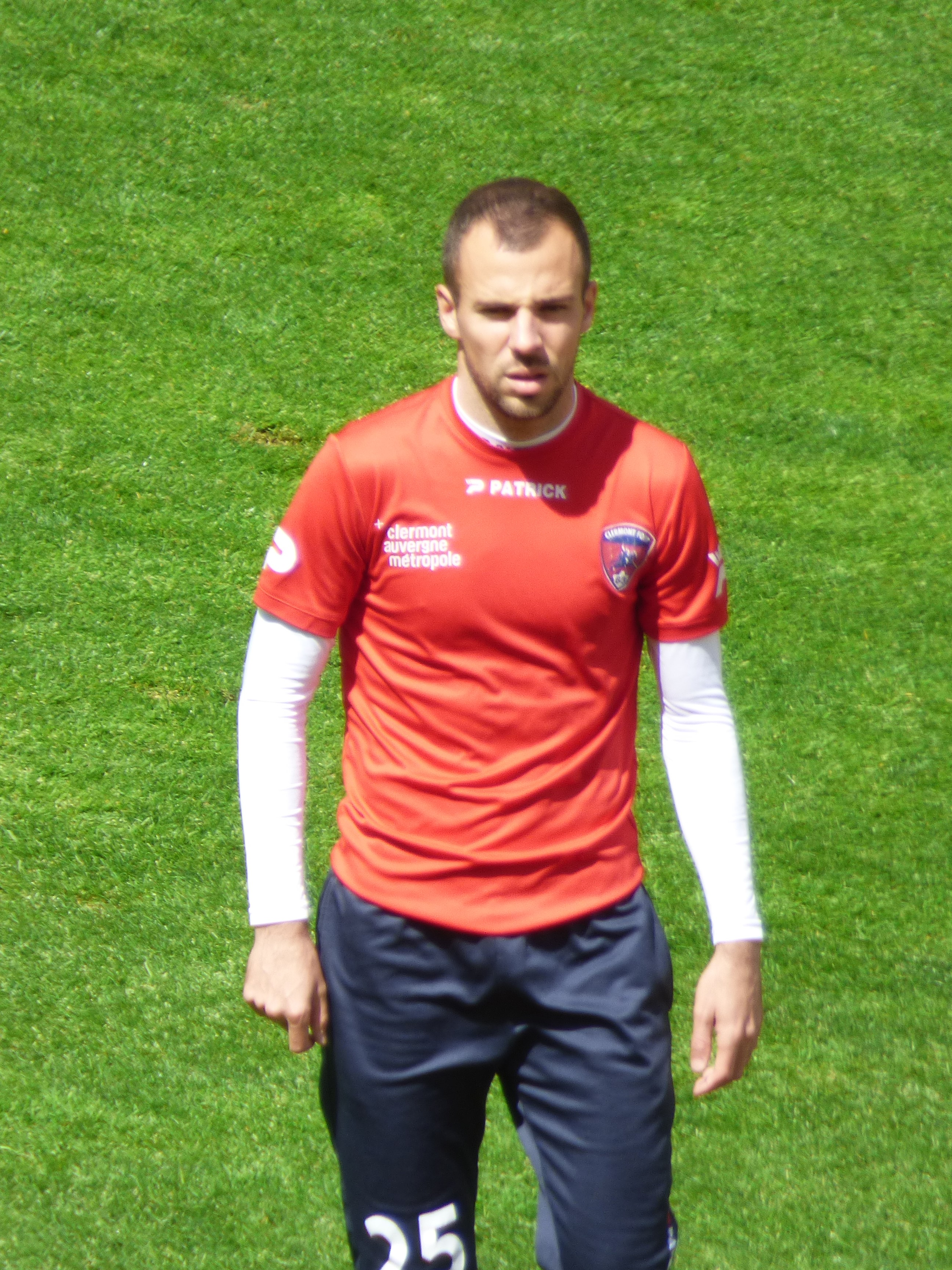
- Gastien with Clermont in 2019

Personal information
- Date of birth: 25 January 1988 (age 38)
- Place of birth: Niort, France
- Height: 1.79 m (5 ft 10 in)
- Position: Midfielder

Youth career
- 1997–2007: Niort

Senior career*
Years	Team	Apps	(Gls)
2007–2013	Niort	140	(14)
2013–2017	Dijon	110	(9)
2017–2018	Brest	40	(1)
2017–2018	Brest B	4	(0)
2018–2026	Clermont	233	(6)
- * Club domestic league appearances and goals

Johan Gastien (born 25 January 1988) is a French former professional footballer who played as a midfielder.

== Career ==
Gastien started his career with his home-town club Niort and made his debut in the 2–1 victory over Libourne-Saint-Seurin in Ligue 2 on 28 March 2008, coming on as a substitute for Ronan Biger. On 27 March 2010, he scored his first senior goal in Niort's 1–0 victory over Toulouse Fontaines, but was sent off later in the match. Gastien was part of the team that won promotion from the Championnat de France amateur in 2010 and subsequently promotion back to Ligue 2 two years later. In total, he played 140 league matches during six senior seasons with the club, scoring 14 goals.

On 25 May 2013, it was announced that Gastien had agreed a contract with Dijon for the 2013–14 season.

== Personal life ==
He is the son of football manager and former player, Pascal Gastien. Johan has been coached by his father at Niort and Clermont.

== Career statistics ==
As of match played 19 May 2024

Appearances and goals by club, season and competition
Club	Season	League			National cup		League cup		Other		Total	
Club	Season	Division	Apps	Goals	Apps	Goals	Apps	Goals	Apps	Goals	Apps	Goals
Niort	2007–08	Ligue 2	1	0	0	0	0	0	—		1	0
Niort	2008–09	National	20	0	4	1	1	0	—		25	1
Niort	2009–10	CFA	20	3	2	0	—		—		22	3
Niort	2010–11	National	33	4	0	0	0	0	—		33	4
Niort	2011–12	National	32	3	2	0	0	0	—		34	3
Niort	2012–13	Ligue 2	34	4	1	0	2	0	—		37	4
Niort	Total		140	14	9	1	3	0	—		152	15
Dijon	2013–14	Ligue 2	30	7	2	0	1	0	—		33	7
Dijon	2014–15	Ligue 2	30	2	2	0	2	0	—		34	2
Dijon	2015–16	Ligue 2	35	0	0	0	2	0	—		37	0
Dijon	2016–17	Ligue 1	15	0	1	0	1	0	—		17	0
Dijon	Total		110	9	5	0	6	0	—		121	9
Brest	2016–17	Ligue 2	16	1	0	0	0	0	—		16	1
Brest	2017–18	Ligue 2	24	0	0	0	1	0	0	0	25	0
Brest	Total		40	1	0	0	1	0	0	0	41	1
Brest B	2017–18	National 3	4	0	—		—		—		4	0
Clermont	2018–19	Ligue 2	32	0	3	0	2	0	—		37	0
Clermont	2019–20	Ligue 2	23	0	0	0	1	0	—		24	0
Clermont	2020–21	Ligue 2	35	1	1	0	—		—		36	1
Clermont	2021–22	Ligue 1	32	0	1	0	—		—		33	0
Clermont	2022–23	Ligue 1	31	4	0	0	—		—		31	4
Clermont	2023–24	Ligue 1	28	0	2	0	—		—		30	0
Clermont	Total		181	5	7	0	3	0	—		191	5
Career totals			434	26	15	0	12	0	0	0	461	26
