= Saîf-Eddine Khaoui =

Association football player (born 1995)

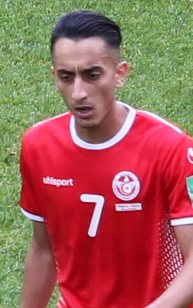
- Khaoui playing for Tunisia at the 2018 FIFA World Cup

Personal information
- Full name: Saîfeddine Khaoui
- Date of birth: 27 April 1995 (age 31)
- Place of birth: Paris, France
- Height: 1.79 m (5 ft 10 in)
- Position: Midfielder

Team information
- Current team: Red Star
- Number: 10

Youth career
- 2008-2011: INF Clairefontaine
- 2008-2010: FC Franconville
- 2010–2011: Entente SSG
- 2011–2014: Tours

Senior career*
| Years | Team | Apps | (Gls) |
| 2013–2015 | Tours B | 23 | (10) |
| 2014–2016 | Tours | 39 | (4) |
| 2016–2018 | Marseille B | 8 | (2) |
| 2016–2021 | Marseille | 33 | (2) |
| 2017–2018 | → Troyes (loan) | 32 | (5) |
| 2018–2019 | → Caen (loan) | 26 | (3) |
| 2021–2023 | Clermont | 57 | (8) |
| 2023–2024 | Khor Fakkan | 6 | (0) |
| 2025 | Macarthur FC | 5 | (0) |
| 2025– | Red Star | 30 | (2) |

International career^{‡}
| 2015 | Tunisia U21 | 1 | (1) |
| 2018–2020 | Tunisia | 27 | (4) |
- * Club domestic league appearances and goals as of 11 May 2026 ‡ National team caps and goals as of 21:20, 21 July 2023 (UTC)

Saîf-Eddine Khaoui (Arabic: سيف الدين خاوي; born 27 April 1995) is a professional footballer who plays as a midfielder for Ligue 2 club Red Star. Born in France, he plays for the Tunisia national team.

== Club career ==
=== Tours ===
Khaoui is a youth exponent from Tours. He made his Ligue 2 debut on 14 February 2014 against Istres in a 1–0 away loss.

=== Marseille ===
On 18 June 2016, Tours confirmed that they had reached an agreement with Marseille for the sale of Khaoui. He made his league debut on 14 August 2016 in a 0–0 draw with Toulouse, replacing Florian Thauvin at halftime.

==== Loan to Troyes ====
On 26 July 2017, having spent only a month at Marseille, Khaoui was sent out on loan to Troyes. He made his debut on 5 August 2017 in a 1–1 draw with Rennes.

==== Loan to Cannes ====
On 31 August 2018, the last day of the 2018 transfer window, Khaoui joined Caen on loan for the 2018–19 season.

=== Clermont ===
On 14 August 2021, Khaoui joined newly promoted Ligue 1 side Clermont on a two-year deal.

=== Khor Fakkan ===
On 11 June 2023, it was confirmed that Khaoui would join UAE Pro League club Khor Fakkan following the expiration of his Clermont contract.

=== Macarthur FC ===
On 2 February 2025, it was confirmed that Khaoui would be joining A-League club Macarthur Football Club

== International career ==
Khaoui was called up by the Tunisia U21 squad, and scored in his debut against Nigeria U21. He was called up to the Tunisia Olympic team for their matches in 2016.

Khaoui made his senior debut for the Tunisia national team in a friendly 1–0 win over Iran on 23 March 2018.

In June 2018 he was named in Tunisia's 23-man squad for the 2018 FIFA World Cup in Russia.

== Personal life ==
Khaoui was born and raised in France to parents of Tunisian descent.

== Career statistics ==
As of 1 July 2023

Appearances and goals by club, season and competition
| Club | Season | League | | | National cup (Note: Includes Coupe de France.) | | League cup (Note: Includes Coupe de la Ligue.) | | Total | |
| Club | Season | Division | Apps | Goals | Apps | Goals | Apps | Goals | Apps | Goals |
|---|---|---|---|---|---|---|---|---|---|---|
| Tours B | 2013–14 | CFA 2 | 13 | 3 | — | | — | | 13 | 3 |
| Tours B | 2014–15 | CFA 2 | 10 | 7 | — | | — | | 10 | 7 |
| Tours B | Total | | 23 | 10 | — | | — | | 23 | 10 |
| Tours | 2013–14 | Ligue 2 | 10 | 0 | 0 | 0 | 0 | 0 | 10 | 0 |
| Tours | 2014–15 | Ligue 2 | 2 | 1 | 1 | 0 | 0 | 0 | 3 | 1 |
| Tours | 2015–16 | Ligue 2 | 27 | 3 | 1 | 0 | 4 | 0 | 32 | 3 |
| Tours | Total | | 39 | 4 | 2 | 0 | 4 | 0 | 45 | 4 |
| Marseille B | 2016–17 | CFA | 7 | 2 | — | | — | | 7 | 2 |
| Marseille B | 2018–19 | National 2 | 1 | 0 | — | | — | | 1 | 0 |
| Marseille B | Total | | 8 | 2 | — | | — | | 8 | 2 |
| Marseille | 2016–17 | Ligue 1 | 9 | 0 | 1 | 0 | 0 | 0 | 10 | 0 |
| Marseille | 2019–20 | Ligue 1 | 7 | 0 | 3 | 0 | 1 | 0 | 11 | 0 |
| Marseille | 2020–21 | Ligue 1 | 17 | 2 | 2 | 0 | — | | 19 | 2 |
| Marseille | Total | | 33 | 2 | 6 | 0 | 1 | 0 | 40 | 2 |
| Troyes (loan) | 2017–18 | Ligue 1 | 32 | 5 | 2 | 0 | 1 | 0 | 35 | 5 |
| Caen (loan) | 2018–19 | Ligue 1 | 25 | 3 | 3 | 2 | 1 | 1 | 29 | 6 |
| Caen B (loan) | 2018–19 | National 3 | 1 | 2 | — | | — | | 1 | 2 |
| Clermont | 2021–22 | Ligue 1 | 23 | 1 | 1 | 1 | — | | 24 | 2 |
| Clermont | 2022–23 | Ligue 1 | 34 | 7 | 0 | 0 | — | | 34 | 7 |
| Clermont | Total | | 57 | 8 | 1 | 1 | — | | 58 | 9 |
| Khor Fakkan | 2023–24 | UAE Pro League | 0 | 0 | 0 | 0 | — | | 0 | 0 |
| Career totals | | | 218 | 36 | 14 | 3 | 7 | 1 | 239 | 40 |

Appearances and goals by national team and year
| National team | Year | Apps | Goals |
|---|---|---|---|
| Tunisia | 2018 | 9 | 0 |
| Tunisia | 2019 | 5 | 2 |
| Tunisia | 2020 | 3 | 2 |
| Total | | 17 | 4 |

Scores and results list Tunisia's goal tally first, score column indicates score after each Khaoui goal.

List of international goals scored by Saîf-Eddine Khaoui
| No. | Date | Venue | Opponent | Score | Result | Competition |
|---|---|---|---|---|---|---|
| 1 | 15 November 2019 | Stade Olympique de Radès, Radès, Tunisia | Libya | 2–0 | 4–1 | 2021 Africa Cup of Nations qualification |
| 2 | 15 November 2019 | Stade Olympique de Radès, Radès, Tunisia | Libya | 3–1 | 4–1 | 2021 Africa Cup of Nations qualification |
| 3 | 9 October 2020 | Stade Olympique de Radès, Radès, Tunisia | Sudan | 1–0 | 3–0 | Friendly |
| 4 | 17 November 2020 | National Stadium, Dar es Salaam, Tanzania | Tanzania | 1–0 | 1–1 | 2021 Africa Cup of Nations qualification |
