= Yohann Magnin =

French footballer (born 1997)

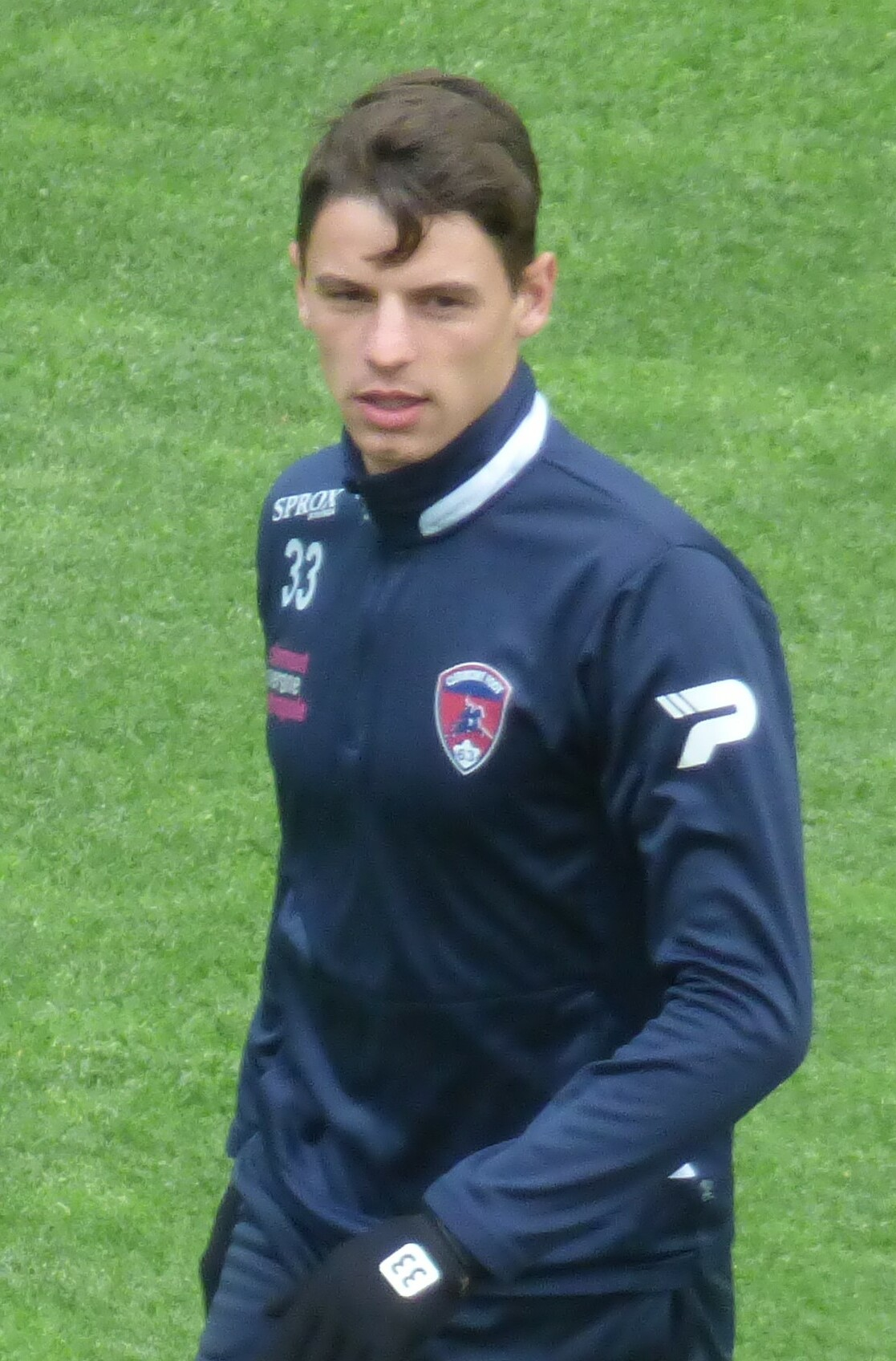
- Magnin in 2019

Personal information
- Date of birth: 21 June 1997 (age 29)
- Place of birth: Clermont-Ferrand, France
- Height: 1.83 m (6 ft 0 in)
- Position: Midfielder

Team information
- Current team: Grenoble

Senior career*
Years	Team	Apps	(Gls)
2016–2021	Clermont B	69	(7)
2018–2025	Clermont	183	(6)
2025–2026	CSKA 1948	22	(0)
2026–	Grenoble	0	(0)
- * Club domestic league appearances and goals as of 12:36, 30 May 2026 (UTC)

Yohann Magnin (born 21 June 1997) is a French professional footballer who plays as a midfielder for Ligue 2 club Grenoble.

== Career ==
Born in Clermont-Ferrand, France, Magnin progressed through the youth academy of hometown club Clermont. He made his professional debut for the club on 4 December 2018 in a Ligue 2 match against Paris FC. He came off the bench for Johan Gastien as his team lost 3–0. He signed his first professional contract in January 2019.

On 22 January 2020, Magnin signed a contract extension with Clermont until 2023. He scored his first professional goal on 7 February against Valenciennes in a 3–1 win. As a starter in the Clermont midfield during this 2019–20 season, he was voted into the Ligue 2 Team of the Season by France Football.

During the 2020–21 season, he contributed to the club's historic promotion to Ligue 1, as Clermont rose to the top division of French football for the first time ever. However, he was sidelined by an anterior cruciate ligament rupture in his right knee in April 2021, ending his season and keeping him out of action for several months.

He returned to team practice in August 2021, having been out for several months due to his knee injury. On 1 December 2021, Magnin scored his first goal in Ligue 1, during his first tenure in the top flight, against Lens. He scored the equalizing goal with a header in a 2–2 draw.

On 12 June 2026, Magnin signed with Ligue 2 club Grenoble.

== Honours ==
Individual

- France Football Team of the Season: 2019–20
