= Baïla Diallo =

Footballer (born 2001)

Personal information
- Date of birth: 24 June 2001 (age 25)
- Place of birth: Toulouse, France
- Height: 1.76 m (5 ft 9 in)
- Position: Left-back

Team information
- Current team: Granada
- Number: 22

Youth career
- Toulouse
- 2016–2018: Colomiers
- 2018–2019: Clermont

Senior career*
Years	Team	Apps	(Gls)
2019–2023	Clermont II	24	(3)
2021–2025	Clermont	37	(0)
2021–2022	→ Orléans (loan)	28	(1)
2023–2024	→ Austria Lustenau (loan)	13	(0)
2025–	Granada	34	(0)

International career
2022	Senegal U23	2	(0)
- * Club domestic league appearances and goals as of 9 June 2026

Baïla Diallo (born 24 June 2001) is a professional footballer who plays as a left-back for Segunda División club Granada. Born in France, he was a youth international for Senegal.

== Club career ==
Diallo is a youth product of Toulouse and Colomiers, before moving to the youth academy of Clermont in 2018. He began his senior career with their reserves in 2019. On 20 January 2021, he made his professional debut with the senior Clermont side in a 1–1 Coupe de France tie with Grenoble. A couple days later on 22 January 2021, Diallo signed his first professional contract with Clermont, keeping him at the club until June 2024. He spent the 2021–22 season on loan with Orléans in the Championnat National, where he played 31 games, assisted three times and scored one goal in all competitions before returning to Clermont.

On 19 July 2023, Diallo joined Austria Lustenau in Austria on loan. Back to Clermont in July 2024, he was regularly used before signing a three-year contract with Spanish Segunda División side Granada on 2 July 2025.

== International career ==
Born in France, Diallo is of Senegalese and Guinean descent. He was called up to represent the Senegal U23s for a set of 2023 Africa U-23 Cup of Nations qualification matches in September 2022.
