= Yadaly Diaby =

Guinean footballer (born 2000)

Personal information
- Date of birth: 9 August 2000 (age 26)
- Place of birth: Saint-Pierre, Réunion, France
- Height: 1.84 m (6 ft 0 in)
- Position: Midfielder

Team information
- Current team: Vancouver Whitecaps
- Number: 77

Youth career
- 2011–2012: Jeunesse Foot Sud
- 2013–2019: Andrézieux

Senior career*
| Years | Team | Apps | (Gls) |
| 2019–2021 | Andrézieux-Bouthéon (Note: In 2019, ASF Andrézieux became Andrézieux-Bouthéon FC.) | 16 | (1) |
| 2021 | Clermont B | 12 | (4) |
| 2021–2025 | Clermont | 18 | (2) |
| 2022–2024 | → Austria Lustenau (loan) | 53 | (9) |
| 2025–2026 | Grenoble | 49 | (11) |
| 2026– | Vancouver Whitecaps | 4 | (1) |

International career^{‡}
| 2023– | Guinea | 13 | (1) |
- * Club domestic league appearances and goals as of 20 September 2026 ‡ National team caps and goals as of 8 August 2026

Yadaly Diaby (born 9 August 2000) is a professional footballer who plays as a midfielder for Major League Soccer club Vancouver Whitecaps. Born in France, he plays for the Guinea national team.

== Club career ==
Yadaly Diaby started playing youth football in the Jeunesse Foot Sud club in Saint-Étienne in 2011. He then joined Andrézieux in 2013.

After being promoted to Andrézieux's senior team in 2019, he played several seasons in the Championnat National 2 with them, before joining Clermont in the summer of 2021.

First playing with the reserve team in National 3, his performance—most notably a hat trick against during a 4–1 win against the Académie Moulins—quickly granted him an access to the first team, as he signed his first professional contract with the Auvergnats early November 2021.

Diaby made his professional debut for Clermont Foot on 1 December 2021, replacing an injured Jim Allevinah at the 63rd minute of a 2–2 home Ligue 1 draw against Lens. Whilst he saw hist team equalize just after he came on – as Mohamed Bayo scored the last goal of the game –, Diaby was red carded at the 84th, after he accidentally kicked an opponent. This exclusion earned him a two-match ban from the French competition.

On 3 February 2025, Diaby signed a two-and-a-half-year contract with Grenoble in Ligue 2.

On 1 September 2026, Diaby signed with the Vancouver Whitecaps through the 2029–30 Major League Soccer season, with a club option for the 2030–31 season.

== International career ==
Diaby was born in Saint-Pierre, in Reunion Island (France), to Guinean parents. He debuted with the Guinea national team in a 2–0 2023 Africa Cup of Nations qualification win over Ethiopia on 24 March 2023. He scored his first national team goal and had an assist in a 2-0 friendly against Liberia. in November 2025.

== Style of play ==
An offensively-minded midfielder, Diaby is able to play both as a left or a right midfielder.

== Career statistics ==
=== International ===
As of match played 31 March 2026

Appearances and goals by national team and year
| National team | Year | Apps | Goals |
|---|---|---|---|
| Guinea | 2023 | 5 | 0 |
| Guinea | 2024 | 0 | 0 |
| Guinea | 2025 | 6 | 1 |
| Guinea | 2026 | 2 | 0 |
| Total | | 13 | 1 |

Scores and results list East Guinea's goal tally first, score column indicates score after each Diaby goal.

List of international goals scored by Yadaly Diaby
| No. | Date | Venue | Opponent | Score | Result | Competition |
|---|---|---|---|---|---|---|
| 1 | 15 November 2025 | El Bachir Stadium, Mohammedia, Morocco | Liberia | 2–0 | 2–0 | Friendly |
