= Ouparine Djoco =

Bissau-Guinean footballer (born 1998)

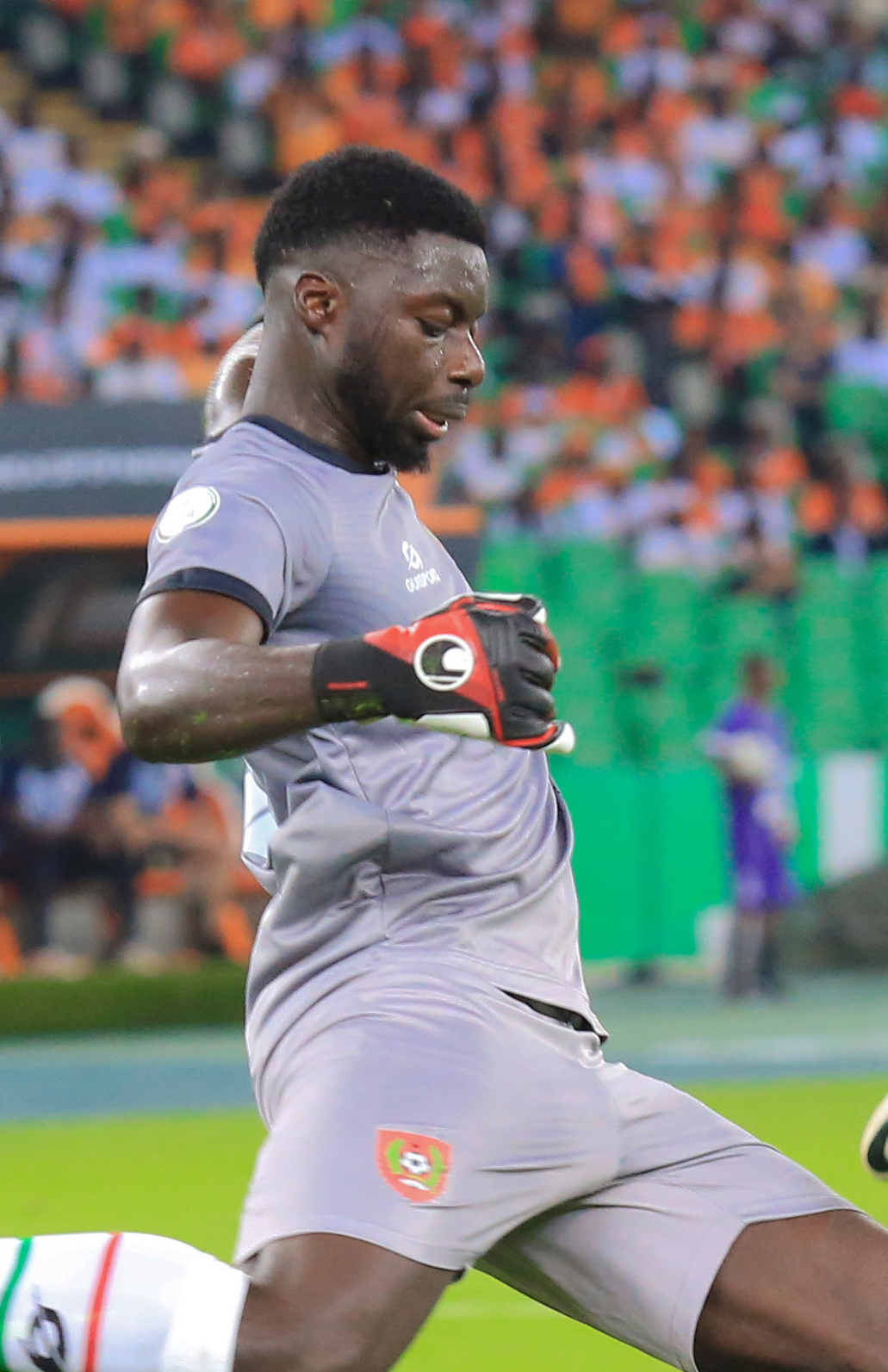
- Djoco in 2024

Personal information
- Date of birth: 22 April 1998 (age 28)
- Place of birth: Juvisy-sur-Orge, France
- Height: 1.88 m (6 ft 2 in)
- Position: Goalkeeper

Youth career
- 2011–2017: Fleury
- 2017–2018: Clermont

Senior career*
Years	Team	Apps	(Gls)
2018–2021	Clermont II	36	(0)
2020–2025	Clermont	28	(0)
2023–2024	→ Francs Borains (loan)	1	(0)
2025	→ Bergerac (loan)	15	(0)
2025–2026	Quevilly-Rouen	19	(0)

International career^{‡}
2023–	Guinea-Bissau	4	(0)
- * Club domestic league appearances and goals as of 23 June 2026 ‡ National team caps and goals as of 18 January 2024

Ouparine Djoco (born 22 April 1998) is a professional footballer who plays as a goalkeeper. Born in France, he plays for the Guinea-Bissau national team.

== Career ==
Djoco is a youth product of Fleury, having joined them at the age of 13. On 19 May 2019, he signed his first professional contract with Clermont. Djoco made his professional debut with Clermont in a 1–1 Ligue 2 tie with Toulouse FC on 19 September 2020.

On 31 July 2023, Djoco joined Francs Borains in the second-tier Belgian Challenger Pro League on loan. In his debut match against Club NXT, he received a straight red card after 90 minutes for pushing an opponent.

== Personal life ==
Born in France, Djoco is of Senegalese and Bissau-Guinean descent.
