= Mory Diaw =

Footballer (born 1993)

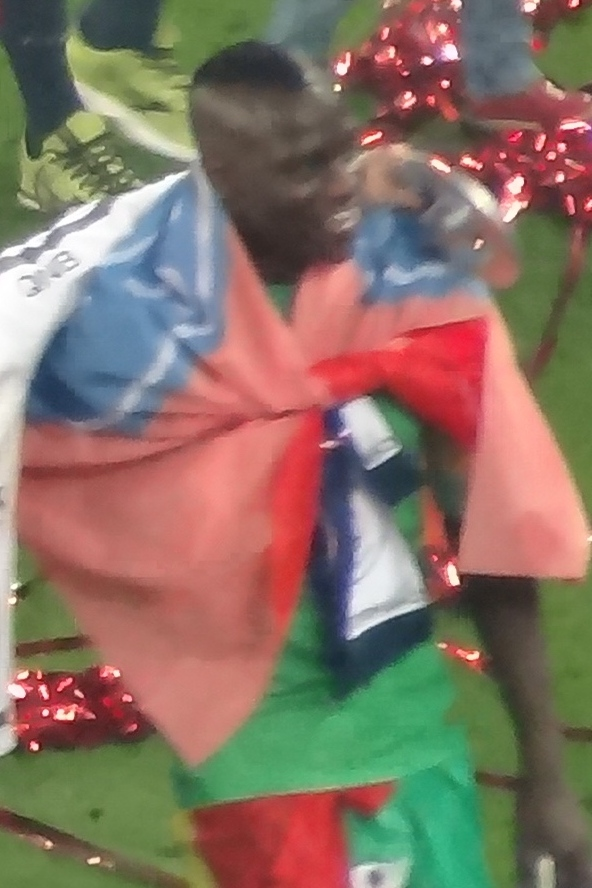
- Diaw in 2015

Personal information
- Date of birth: 22 June 1993 (age 33)
- Place of birth: Poissy, France
- Height: 1.97 m (6 ft 6 in)
- Position: Goalkeeper

Team information
- Current team: Al-Shabab
- Number: 1

Youth career
- 2007–2015: Paris Saint-Germain

Senior career*
Years	Team	Apps	(Gls)
2012–2015	Paris Saint-Germain B	32	(0)
2015–2017	Mafra	17	(0)
2017	Lokomotiv Plovdiv	6	(0)
2019	FC United Zürich	10	(1)
2019–2022	Lausanne-Sport	66	(0)
2022–2025	Clermont	67	(0)
2025	→ Rodez (loan)	11	(0)
2025–2026	Le Havre	30	(0)
2026–	Al-Shabab	8	(0)

International career^{‡}
2023–	Senegal	10	(0)
Medal record
Men's football
Representing Senegal
Africa Cup of Nations
Runner-up	2025 Morocco
- * Club domestic league appearances and goals as of 30 October 2026 ‡ National team caps and goals as of 4 October 2026

Mory Diaw (born 22 June 1993) is a professional footballer who plays as a goalkeeper for Saudi club Al-Shabab. Born in France, he plays for the Senegal national team.

== Club career ==
Diaw began his career in the youth teams of Paris Saint-Germain (PSG). He made one senior appearance, playing 17 minutes in a friendly against TSV Hartberg on 8 July 2014. After being released by PSG in 2015, Diaw signed for Portuguese Segunda Liga outfit Mafra on 29 July 2015.

In April 2017, Diaw went on trial with EFL Championship side Leeds United. He joined Bulgarian side Lokomotiv Plovdiv in July 2017. Following a short and successful trial period, on 8 July 2017 he signed a 2-year contract.

In 2019, Diaw joined FC United Zürich in Switzerland. In June 2019, he signed for second-tier Swiss club Lausanne-Sport, where he replaced the injured second goalkeeper Dany Da Silva.

Diaw made his return to France on 14 June 2022, signing for Ligue 1 side Clermont on a two-year contract with an option for a further year.

On 8 October 2023, in a Ligue 1 match at Montpellier, Diaw was hit by a firework thrown from the crowd, leading to the abandonment of the match.

On 3 February 2025, Diaw moved on loan to Rodez in Ligue 2.

On 12 July 2025, Diaw signed a two-season contract with Le Havre.

== International career ==
Diaw made his international debut for Senegal in a 4–2 friendly win over Brazil on 21 June 2023.

In December 2023, he was named in Senegal's squad for the postponed 2023 Africa Cup of Nations held in the Ivory Coast.

== Personal life ==
Born in France, Diaw is of Senegalese descent.

During his time at Paris Saint-Germain, Diaw became a trending topic on social media site Twitter after a string of obscene tweets posted by his account. Tweets included vulgar jokes and even posting the phone number of teammate Zlatan Ibrahimović. Club officials were quick to address the issue, claiming Diaw's account had been hacked. The tweets have since been deleted.

== Career statistics ==
=== Club ===
As of match played 17 May 2026

Appearances and goals by club, season and competition
Club	Season	League			Cup		Europe		Other		Total	
Club	Season	Division	Apps	Goals	Apps	Goals	Apps	Goals	Apps	Goals	Apps	Goals
Paris Saint-Germain B	2012–13	National	13	0	—		—		—		13	0
Paris Saint-Germain B	2013–14	National	9	0	—		—		—		9	0
Paris Saint-Germain B	2014–15	National	8	0	—		—		—		8	0
Paris Saint-Germain B	Total		30	0	—		—		—		30	0
Mafra	2015–16	Liga Portugal 2	17	0	0	0	—		—		17	0
Lokomotiv Plovdiv	2017–18	Bulgarian First League	6	0	2	0	—		—		8	0
United Zürich	2018–19	1. Liga Classic	11	1	0	0	—		1 (Note: Appearance in 2018–19 Swiss Cup qualification)	0	12	1
Lausanne-Sport	2019–20	Swiss Challenge League	5	0	2	0	—		—		7	0
Lausanne-Sport	2020–21	Swiss Super League	34	0	1	0	—		—		35	0
Lausanne-Sport	2021–22	Swiss Super League	27	0	1	0	—		—		28	0
Lausanne-Sport	Total		66	0	4	0	—		—		70	0
Clermont	2022–23	Ligue 1	37	0	0	0	—		—		37	0
Clermont	2023–24	Ligue 1	30	0	0	0	—		—		30	0
Clermont	Total		67	0	0	0	—		—		67	0
Rodez (loan)	2024–25	Ligue 2	11	0	—		—		—		11	0
Le Havre	2025–26	Ligue 1	30	0	0	0	—		—		30	0
Career total			238	1	6	0	0	0	1	0	245	1

=== International ===
As of match played 4 October 2026

Appearances and goals by national team and year
National team	Year	Apps	Goals
Senegal	2023	1	0
Senegal	2024	2	0
Senegal	2025	1	0
Senegal	2026	6	0
Total		10	0

== Honours ==
Paris Saint-Germain U19

- Championnat National U19: 2010–11
