= 2020–21 Clermont Foot season =

Clermont Foot
2020–21 season
- Chairman: Ahmet Schaefer
- Manager: Pascal Gastien
- Stadium: Stade Gabriel Montpied
- Ligue 2: 2nd (promoted)
- Coupe de France: Eighth round
- Top goalscorer: League: Mohamed Bayo (22); All: Mohamed Bayo (22)
Home colours	Away colours

The 2020–21 Clermont Foot season was the club's 110th season in existence and its seventh consecutive season in the second flight of French football. In addition to the domestic league, Clermont participated in this season's edition of the Coupe de France. The season covered the period from 1 July 2020 to 30 June 2021.

== Players ==
=== First-team squad ===
As of 21 August 2020.

Note: Flags indicate national team as defined under FIFA eligibility rules; some limited exceptions apply. Players may hold more than one non-FIFA nationality.

No.	Pos.	Nation	Player
1	GK	FRA	Arthur Desmas
3	DF	FRA	Julien Boyer
4	DF	BEN	Cédric Hountondji
6	MF	FRA	Jason Berthomier
7	MF	FRA	Yohann Magnin
8	MF	FRA	Lorenzo Rajot
9	FW	FRA	Jordan Tell
10	MF	URU	Jonathan Iglesias (captain)
11	FW	GAB	Jim Allevinah
12	DF	COD	Vital N'Simba
16	GK	FRA	Lucas Margueron
17	DF	GUF	Josué Albert
18	MF	FRA	Sofyan Chader

No.	Pos.	Nation	Player
19	MF	GHA	Salis Abdul Samed (on loan from JMG Academy)
20	DF	FRA	Akim Zedadka
21	DF	FRA	Florent Ogier
22	DF	FRA	Driss Trichard
23	DF	FRA	Jérôme Phojo
24	MF	BEN	Jodel Dossou
25	MF	FRA	Johan Gastien
27	FW	GUI	Mohamed Bayo
28	FW	FRA	David Gomis
32	DF	BIH	Muamer Aljic
36	DF	CIV	Alidu Seidu
40	GK	FRA	Ouparine Djoco

=== Out on loan ===
Note: Flags indicate national team as defined under FIFA eligibility rules; some limited exceptions apply. Players may hold more than one non-FIFA nationality.

No.	Pos.	Nation	Player
—	DF	FRA	Till Cissokho (on loan to Austria Lustenau)
—	MF	FRA	Naël Jaby (on loan to Austria Lustenau)
—	MF	GHA	Blankson Anoff (on loan to Austria Lustenau)

No.	Pos.	Nation	Player
—	MF	BEL	Brandon Baiye (on loan to Austria Lustenau)
—	MF	FRA	Bryan Teixeira (on loan to Orléans)
—	MF	AUT	Muhammed Cham (on loan to Vendsyssel FF)

== Pre-season and friendlies ==
Win Draw Loss

25 July 2020 Friendly	Clermont	0–0	Troyes	Clermont-Ferrand, France
18:00 CEST (UTC+2)		Report		Stadium: Stade Municipal

1 August 2020 Friendly	Rodez	1–0	Clermont	Saint-Chély-d'Apcher, France
18:00 CEST (UTC+2)	Bonnet 43'	Report		Stadium: Complexe Sportif Municipal

5 August 2020 Friendly	Clermont	3–1	Châteauroux	Clermont-Ferrand, France
19:00 CEST (UTC+2)	Tell 32' (pen.), 36', 61'		Sunu 3'	Stadium: Stade Gabriel Montpied

8 August 2020 Friendly	Montpellier	Cancelled	Clermont	Millau, France
18:30 CEST (UTC+2)		Report		Stadium: Stade Gabriel-Monteillet

12 August 2020 Friendly	Orléans	Cancelled	Clermont	Yzeure, France
18:00 CEST (UTC+2)		Report		Stadium: Stade de Bellevue

15 August 2020 Friendly	Grenoble	4–0	Clermont	Grenoble, France
19:30 CEST (UTC+2)	Mombris 35'; Bénet 43' (pen.); Djitté 70', 73'	Report		Stadium: Stade des Alpes; Attendance: 941

4 September 2020 Friendly	Montpellier	1–3	Clermont	Montpellier, France
17:00 CEST (UTC+2)	Savanier 80'	Report	Allevinah 54'; Tell 75'; Chader 90'	Stadium: Centre d'entraînement Bernard-Gasset

== Competitions ==
=== Overview ===
Competition	First match	Last match	Starting round	Final position	Record							
Competition	First match	Last match	Starting round	Final position	Pld	W	D	L	GF	GA	GD	Win %
Ligue 2	22 August 2020	15 May 2021	Matchday 1	2nd	38	21	9	8	61	25	+36	55.26
Coupe de France	20 January 2021		Eighth round	Eighth round	1	0	1	0	1	1	+0	0.00
Total					39	21	10	8	62	26	+36	53.85

Source: Soccerway

=== Ligue 2 ===
==== League table ====
Pos	Team	Pld	W	D	L	GF	GA	GD	Pts	Promotion or Relegation
1	Troyes (C, P)	38	23	8	7	60	36	+24	77	Promotion to Ligue 1
2	Clermont (P)	38	21	9	8	61	25	+36	72	Promotion to Ligue 1
3	Toulouse	38	20	10	8	71	42	+29	70	Qualification to promotion play-offs
4	Grenoble	38	18	11	9	51	35	+16	65	Qualification to promotion play-offs
5	Paris FC	38	17	13	8	53	37	+16	64	Qualification to promotion play-offs

Source: Ligue 2
Rules for classification: 1) Points; 2) Goal difference; 3) Number of goals scored; 4) Head-to-head goal difference; 5) Fair play points
(C) Champions; (P) Promoted

==== Results summary ====
Overall								Home						Away					
Pld	W	D	L	GF	GA	GD	Pts	W	D	L	GF	GA	GD	W	D	L	GF	GA	GD
38	21	9	8	61	25	+36	72	13	5	1	37	9	+28	8	4	7	24	16	+8

Source: Ligue 2

==== Results by round ====
Round	1	2	3	4	5	6	7	8	9	10	11	12	13	14	15	16	17	18	19	20	21	22	23	24	25	26	27	28	29	30	31	32	33	34	35	36	37	38
Ground	H	A	A	H	A	H	A	H	A	H	A	H	A	H	A	H	A	H	A	H	H	A	H	A	H	A	H	A	H	A	H	A	H	A	H	A	H	A
Result	D	D	W	D	L	W	W	L	W	D	D	W	L	W	D	W	W	W	D	W	W	L	W	L	W	W	W	W	W	L	D	L	D	W	W	W	W	L
Position	10	14	9	9	12	8	5	8	4	5	6	5	8	5	6	6	6	4	4	3	3	3	3	4	3	2	2	2	2	2	3	2	3	2	2	2	2	2

Source: Ligue 2
A = Away; H = Home; W = Win; D = Draw; L = Loss

==== Matches ====
The league fixtures were announced on 9 July 2020.

22 August 2020 1	Clermont	0–0	Caen	Clermont-Ferrand
19:00 CEST (UTC+2)		Report		Stadium: Stade Gabriel Montpied; Referee: Olivier Thual

29 August 2020 2	Dunkerque	1–1	Clermont	Dunkirk
19:00 CEST (UTC+2)	Ketkeophomphone 39'	Report	Magnin 53'	Stadium: Stade Marcel Tribute; Referee: Mathieu Vernice

12 September 2020 3	Auxerre	0–1	Clermont	Auxerre
19:00 CEST (UTC+2)		Report	Dossou 84'	Stadium: Stade de l'Abbé-Deschamps; Referee: Guillaume Paradis

19 September 2020 4	Clermont	1–1	Toulouse	Clermont-Ferrand
15:00 CEST (UTC+2)	Berthomier 10'	Report	Antiste 88'	Stadium: Stade Gabriel Montpied; Attendance: 3,406; Referee: Pierre Gaillouste

28 September 2020 5	Troyes	1–0	Clermont	Troyes
20:45 CEST (UTC+2)	Kouamé 13'	Report		Stadium: Stade de l'Aube; Attendance: 0 Referee: Arnaud Baert

3 October 2020 6	Clermont	3–0	Rodez	Clermont-Ferrand
19:00 CEST (UTC+2)	Magnin 5'; Allevinah 44'; Bayo 90+2'	Report		Stadium: Stade Gabriel Montpied; Attendance: 0 Referee: Alexandre Perreau Niel

16 October 2020 7	Chambly	0–3	Clermont	Chambly
19:00 CET (UTC+1)		Report	Berthomier 12'; Bayo 43'; Allevinah 63'	Stadium: Stade des Marais; Attendance: 0 Referee: Guillaume Paradis

24 October 2020 8	Clermont	0–2	Ajaccio	Clermont-Ferrand
19:00 CEST (UTC+2)		Report	Courtet 54' (pen.); R. Nouri 90' (pen.)	Stadium: Stade Gabriel Montpied; Attendance: 0 Referee: Olivier Thual

31 October 2020 9	Valenciennes	1–3	Clermont	Valenciennes
19:00 CET (UTC+1)	Cabral 37'	Report	Bayo 20' (pen.), 67', 86'	Stadium: Stade du Hainaut; Attendance: 0 Referee: Benjamin Lepaysant

7 November 2020 10	Clermont	0–0	Guingamp	Clermont-Ferrand
15:00 CET (UTC+1)		Report		Stadium: Stade Gabriel Montpied; Attendance: 0 Referee: Arnaud Baert

21 November 2020 11	Amiens	1–1	Clermont	Amiens
19:00 CET (UTC+1)	Zedadka 45' (o.g.)	Report	Bayo 67'	Stadium: Stade de la Licorne; Attendance: 0 Referee: Guillaume Paradis

28 November 2020 12	Clermont	2–0	Nancy	Clermont-Ferrand
19:00 CET (UTC+1)	Dossou 30'; Allevinah 69'	Report		Stadium: Stade Gabriel Montpied; Attendance: 0 Referee: Sylvain Palhies

1 December 2020 13	Niort	1–0	Clermont	Niort
19:00 CET (UTC+1)	Bâ 22'	Report		Stadium: Stade René Gaillard; Attendance: 0 Referee: Nicolas Rainville

5 December 2020 14	Clermont	3–0	Pau	Clermont-Ferrand
19:00 CET (UTC+1)	Bayo 37', 55'; Allevinah 63'	Report		Stadium: Stade Gabriel Montpied; Attendance: 0 Referee: Gaël Angoula

14 December 2020 15	Le Havre	0–0	Clermont	Le Havre
20:45 CET (UTC+1)		Report		Stadium: Stade Océane; Referee: Olivier Thual

19 December 2020 16	Clermont	3–2	Paris FC	Clermont-Ferrand
15:00 CET (UTC+1)	Dossou 7', 22'; Berthomier 52'	Report	Ogier 42' (o.g.); López 77'	Stadium: Stade Gabriel Montpied; Attendance: 0 Referee: Jérôme Miguelgorry

22 December 2020 17	Châteauroux	0–1	Clermont	Châteauroux
20:00 CET (UTC+2)		Report	Allevinah 11'	Stadium: Stade Gaston Petit; Referee: Mehdi Mokhtari

5 January 2021 18	Clermont	3–0	Grenoble	Clermont-Ferrand
20:00 CET (UTC+1)	Hountondji 14'; Dossou 77'; Bayo 90+4'	Report		Stadium: Stade Gabriel Montpied; Attendance: 0 Referee: Sylvain Palhies

8 January 2021 19	Sochaux	0–0	Clermont	Montbéliard
20:00CET (UTC+1)		Report		Stadium: Stade Auguste Bonal; Attendance: 0 Referee: Romain Delpech

16 January 2021 20	Clermont	5–0	Dunkerque	Clermont-Ferrand
19:00 CET (UTC+1)	Dossou 28'; Allevinah 45'; Bayo 46', 56', 59'	Report		Stadium: Stade Gabriel Montpied; Attendance: 0 Referee: Benjamin Lepaysant

23 January 2021 21	Clermont	1–0	Auxerre	Clermont-Ferrand
15:00 CET (UTC+1)	Dossou 13'	Report		Stadium: Stade Gabriel Montpied; Attendance: 0 Referee: Jeremy Stinat

30 January 2021 22	Toulouse	3–2	Clermont	Toulouse
15:00 CET (UTC+1)	Van den Boomen 5', 50'; Spierings 67'	Report	Allevinah 42'; Iglesias 85'	Stadium: Stadium de Toulouse; Attendance: 0 Referee: Karim Abed

2 February 2021 23	Clermont	2–1	Troyes	Clermont-Ferrand
20:00 CET (UTC+1)	Zedadka 14'; Bayo 29' (pen.)	Report	Salmier 71'	Stadium: Stade Gabriel Montpied; Attendance: 0 Referee: Amaury Delerue

5 February 2021 24	Rodez	2–0	Clermont	Rodez
20:00 CET (UTC+1)	David 77'; Ruffaut 90+4'	Report		Stadium: Stade Paul-Lignon; Attendance: 0 Referee: Romain Lissorgue

13 February 2021 25	Clermont	1–0	Chambly	Clermont-Ferrand
19:00 CET (UTC+1)	Bayo 61'	Report		Stadium: Stade Gabriel Montpied; Attendance: 0 Referee: Benjamin Lepaysant

20 February 2021 26	Ajaccio	0–2	Clermont	Ajaccio
19:00 CET (UTC+1)		Report	Allevinah 54'; Bayo 58'	Stadium: Stade François Coty; Attendance: 0 Referee: Sylvain Palhies

27 February 2021 27	Clermont	4–0	Valenciennes	Clermont-Ferrand
19:00 CET (UTC+1)	Bayo 30'; Dossou 31', 55'; Allevinah 59'	Report		Stadium: Stade Gabriel Montpied; Attendance: 0 Referee: Alexandre Perreau Niel

2 March 2021 28	Guingamp	0–5	Clermont	Guingamp
20:00 CET (UTC+1)		Report	Allevinah 14'; Dossou 31'; Bayo 54'; Tell 65'; Iglesias 72'	Stadium: Stade du Roudourou; Attendance: 0 Referee: Nicolas Rainville

20 March 2021 30	Nancy	1–0	Clermont	Tomblaine
20:00 CET (UTC+1)	Rocha Santos (yellow card) 31'; Latouchent (yellow card) 43'; Ciss 90'; Merghem (yellow card) 90+1'	Report	Berthomier (yellow card) 63'	Stadium: Stade Marcel Picot; Referee: Abdelatif Kherradji

3 April 2021 31	Clermont	0–0	Niort	Clermont-Ferrand
20:00 CEST (UTC+2)	Zedadka (yellow card) 35'	Report	Louiserre (yellow card) 23'; Bourhane (yellow card) 41'; Ba (penalty missed) 52', (yellow card) 90+2'; Kemen (yellow card) 76'	Stadium: Stade Gabriel Montpied; Referee: Arnaud Baert

10 April 2021 32	Pau	2–1	Clermont	Pau
20:00 CEST (UTC+2)	Koffi (yellow card) 7'; Batisse (yellow card) 30'; George 53'; S. Diarra (yellow card) 59'; Daubin (yellow card) 67'; Beusnard 90+1'	Report	Berthomier 30'; Ogier (yellow card) 61'; Hountondji (yellow card) 65'; Allevinah (yellow card) 80'	Stadium: Stade du Hameau; Referee: Mathieu Vernice

14 April 2021 29	Clermont	3–0	Amiens	Clermont-Ferrand
20:00 CEST (UTC+2)	Dossou 7'; Gomis (yellow card) 58'; Bayo 70'; Gastien 86'	Report		Stadium: Stade Gabriel Montpied; Referee: Gaël Angoula
Note: Reschedule of postponed 13 March 2021 match after multiple COVID positives among the Clermont roster.

17 April 2021 33	Clermont	1–1	Le Havre	Clermont-Ferrand
15:00 CEST (UTC+2)	Seidu (red card) 44'; Tell 72'; Samed (yellow card) 77'	Report	Thiaré 18'; W. Coulibaly (yellow card) 36'	Stadium: Stade Gabriel Montpied; Referee: Romain Lissorgue

20 April 2021 34	Paris FC	0–1	Clermont	Paris
15:00 CEST (UTC+2)	Nomenjanahary (yellow card) 36'; Abdi (yellow card) 87' (yellow-red card) 87'; Martin (yellow card) 89'	Report	Bayo 51'; Hountondji (yellow card) 70'	Stadium: Stade Sébastien Charléty; Referee: Pierre Gaillouste

24 April 2021 35	Clermont	2–1	Châteauroux	Clermont-Ferrand
20:45 CEST (UTC+2)	Berthomier 6', 80'	Report	Grange 72'	Stadium: Stade Gabriel Montpied; Referee: Olivier Thual

1 May 2021 36	Grenoble	1–2	Clermont	Grenoble
20:45 CET (UTC+1)	Gaspar (yellow card) 5'; Semedo 90+1' (pen.)	Report	Allevinah 19'; Bayo (penalty missed) 45+2', 45+2'	Stadium: Stade des Alpes; Referee: Jérôme Miguelgorry

8 May 2021 37	Clermont	3–1	Sochaux	Clermont-Ferrand
20:00 CEST (UTC+2)	Bayo 8'; Dossou 34'; Allevinah 50'	Report	Soumaré 28' (pen.); Thioune (yellow card) 36'; Ambri (yellow card) 80'	Stadium: Stade Gabriel Montpied; Referee: Romain Delpech

15 May 2021 38	Caen	2–1	Clermont	Caen
20:00 CEST (UTC+2)	Hervieu (red card) 38'; Oniangué 82'; Jeannot 90+2' (pen.), (yellow card) 90+4'	Report	Bayo 89'	Stadium: Stade Michel d'Ornano; Referee: Bastien Dechepy

=== Coupe de France ===
20 January 2021 Eighth round	Clermont	1–1 (2–4 p)	Grenoble	Clermont-Ferrand
13:45 CET (UTC+1)	Tell 33'	Report	Mombris 32'	Stadium: Stade Gabriel Montpied; Referee: Olivier Thual
	Penalties
	Berthomier (penalty scored); Allevinah (penalty missed); Magnin (penalty missed); Rajot (penalty scored)		(penalty scored) Tapoko; (penalty scored) Semedo; (penalty scored) Pickel; (penalty scored) Straalman
