= 2021–22 Clermont Foot season =

Clermont Foot
2021–22 season
- President: Ahmet Schaefer
- Head coach: Pascal Gastien
- Stadium: Stade Gabriel Montpied
- Ligue 1: 17th
- Coupe de France: Round of 32
- Top goalscorer: League: Mohamed Bayo (14); All: Mohamed Bayo (14)
Home colours	Away colours	Third colours

The 2021–22 season was the 111th season in existence of Clermont Foot and its first in the Ligue 1, the French top flight. In addition to the domestic league, Clermont participated in this season's edition of the Coupe de France.

== Players ==
=== First-team squad ===
As of 1 February 2022.

Note: Flags indicate national team as defined under FIFA eligibility rules; some limited exceptions apply. Players may hold more than one non-FIFA nationality.

No.	Pos.	Nation	Player
1	GK	FRA	Arthur Desmas
4	DF	BEN	Cédric Hountondji
5	DF	CMR	Jean-Claude Billong
6	MF	TUN	Saîf-Eddine Khaoui
7	MF	FRA	Yohann Magnin
8	MF	FRA	Jason Berthomier
9	FW	FRA	Grejohn Kyei
10	FW	FRA	Lucas Da Cunha (on loan from OGC Nice)
11	FW	GAB	Jim Allevinah
12	DF	COD	Vital N'Simba
15	DF	SEN	Arial Mendy
16	GK	FRA	Lucas Margueron
17	DF	GUF	Josué Albert

No.	Pos.	Nation	Player
18	FW	KOS	Elbasan Rashani
19	MF	GHA	Salis Abdul Samed
20	DF	FRA	Akim Zedadka
21	DF	FRA	Florent Ogier (captain)
22	MF	ESP	Oriol Busquets
23	DF	FRA	Jérôme Phojo
24	MF	BEN	Jodel Dossou
25	MF	FRA	Johan Gastien (vice-captain)
26	FW	FRA	Pierre-Yves Hamel (on loan from FC Lorient)
27	FW	GUI	Mohamed Bayo
29	MF	FRA	Naël Jaby
36	DF	GHA	Alidu Seidu
40	GK	FRA	Ouparine Djoco

=== Out on loan ===
Note: Flags indicate national team as defined under FIFA eligibility rules; some limited exceptions apply. Players may hold more than one non-FIFA nationality.

No.	Pos.	Nation	Player
—	DF	FRA	Julien Boyer (on loan to SC Bastia)
—	MF	GHA	Blankson Anoff (on loan to Swift Hesperange)
—	MF	BEL	Brandon Baiye (on loan to Austria Lustenau)
—	MF	FRA	Sofyan Chader (on loan to Stade Lausanne Ouchy)
—	DF	FRA	Till Cissokho (on loan to Quevilly-Rouen)

No.	Pos.	Nation	Player
—	DF	FRA	Baïla Diallo (on loan to Orléans)
—	MF	AUT	Muhammed Cham (on loan to Austria Lustenau)
—	MF	FRA	Bryan Teixeira (on loan to Austria Lustenau)
—	MF	TUR	Cem Türkmen (on loan to Austria Lustenau)

== Transfers ==
=== In ===
No.	Pos.	Nation	Player
5	DF	CMR	Jean-Claude Billong (from (Italy) Benevento, previously on loan at (Turkey) Hatayspor)
6	MF	TUN	Saîf-Eddine Khaoui (from Marseille)
15	DF	SEN	Arial Mendy (from (Switzerland) Servette)
18	FW	KOS	Elbasan Rashani (from (Turkey) BB Erzurumspor)
19	MF	GHA	Salis Abdul Samed (from (Ivory Coast) JMG Academy, previously on loan)
—	MF	ESP	Oriol Busquets (from (Spain) Barcelona B)
—	MF	TUR	Cem Türkmen (from (Germany) Bayer Leverkusen)

=== Out ===
No.	Pos.	Nation	Player
8	MF	FRA	Lorenzo Rajot (to Rodez)
18	MF	FRA	Sofyan Chader (on loan to (Switzerland) Stade Lausanne Ouchy)
22	DF	FRA	Driss Trichard (to Dunkerque)
28	FW	GBS	David Gomis (to Pau)
32	DF	BIH	Muamer Aljic (to Louhans-Cuiseaux)
34	DF	FRA	Baïla Diallo (on loan to Orléans)
—	MF	TUR	Cem Türkmen (on loan to Austria Lustenau)
—	DF	FRA	Till Cissokho (on loan to Quevilly-Rouen, previously on loan at Austria Lustenau)
—	MF	GHA	Blankson Anoff (on loan to (Luxembourg) Swift Hesperange, previously on loan at Austria Lustenau)
—	MF	AUT	Muhammed Cham (on loan to Austria Lustenau, previously on loan at (Denmark) Vendsyssel)

== Pre-season and friendlies ==
Win Draw Loss Fixtures

3 July 2021 Friendly	Troyes (France)	1–2	(France) Clermont	Le Chambon-sur-Lignon, France
17:00 CEST (UTC+2)	Suk 80'	Report	Teixeira 35'; Allevinah 39'	Stadium: Stade Municipal

10 July 2021 Friendly	Clermont (France)	2–2	(France) Rodez	Clermont-Ferrand, France
18:00 CEST (UTC+2)		Report		Stadium: Stade Philippe Marcombes; Attendance: 1,000

14 July 2021 Friendly	Clermont (France)	0–0	(France) Grenoble	Espaly-Saint-Marcel, France
18:00 CEST (UTC+2)		Report		Stadium: Stade Charles Massot

17 July 2021 Friendly	Clermont (France)	3–2	(France) Montpellier	Millau, France
18:00 CEST (UTC+2)	Ogier 45+5'; Bayo 58'; Tell 90+2'	Report	Wahi 9'; Mollet 30'	Stadium: Stade Gabriel-Monteillet

21 July 2021 Friendly	Clermont (France)	1–0	(France) UNFP	Domerat, France
18:00 CEST (UTC+2)	Berthomier 82'	Report		Stadium: Stade Municipal

24 July 2021 Friendly	Saint-Étienne (France)	2–3	(France) Clermont	Saint-Étienne, France
18:00 CEST (UTC+2)	Abi 27'; Boudebouz 66' (pen.)	Report	N'Simba 35'; Bayo 62'; Rashani 64'	Stadium: Stade Geoffroy-Guichard

31 July 2021 Friendly	Nantes (France)	1–2	(France) Clermont	Indre-et-Loire, France
16:00 CEST (UTC+2)	Blas (yellow card) 29'; Girotto (yellow card) 63'; Moutoussamy 90'		Ogier (yellow card) 31'; Tell 60' (pen.); Dossou 79'; Seidu (yellow card) 81'	Stadium: Stade Marcel Vignaud; Referee: Amaury Delerue

== Competitions ==
=== Overall record ===
Competition	First match	Last match	Starting round	Final position	Record							
Competition	First match	Last match	Starting round	Final position	Pld	W	D	L	GF	GA	GD	Win %
Ligue 1	8 August 2021	21 May 2022	Matchday 1	17th	38	9	9	20	38	69	−31	23.68
Coupe de France	18 December 2021	2 January 2022	Round of 64	Round of 32	2	1	0	1	4	2	+2	50.00
Total					40	10	9	21	42	71	−29	25.00

Source: Soccerway

=== Ligue 1 ===
==== League table ====
Pos	Team	Pld	W	D	L	GF	GA	GD	Pts	Qualification or relegation
15	Troyes	38	9	11	18	37	53	−16	38	
16	Lorient	38	8	12	18	35	63	−28	36	
17	Clermont	38	9	9	20	38	69	−31	36	
18	Saint-Étienne (R)	38	7	11	20	42	77	−35	32	Qualification for the relegation play-offs
19	Metz (R)	38	6	13	19	35	69	−34	31	Relegation to Ligue 2 (Note: Bordeaux were initially relegated to Ligue 2. However, on 14 June it was decided by the DNCG to relegate Bordeaux administratively to the Championnat National for financial issues. On 27 July 2022, Bordeaux won its appeal and was officially maintained in Ligue 2 for the 2022–23 season.)

Source: Ligue 1
Rules for classification: 1) Points; 2) Goal difference; 3) Head-to-head points; 4) Head-to-head goal difference; 5) Head-to-head goals scored; 6) Head-to-head away goals scored; 7) Goals scored; 8) Away goals scored; 9) Fair-play points (Note: Head-to-head record is used only after all the matches between the teams in question have been played).
(R) Relegated

==== Results summary ====
Overall								Home						Away					
Pld	W	D	L	GF	GA	GD	Pts	W	D	L	GF	GA	GD	W	D	L	GF	GA	GD
38	9	9	20	38	69	−31	36	4	6	9	22	33	−11	5	3	11	16	36	−20

Source: Ligue 1

==== Results by round ====
Round	1	2	3	4	5	6	7	8	9	10	11	12	13	14	15	16	17	18	19	20	21	22	23	24	25	26	27	28	29	30	31	32	33	34	35	36	37	38
Ground	A	H	A	H	A	H	A	H	A	H	A	H	A	H	A	H	A	A	H	H	A	H	A	H	A	H	A	H	A	H	H	A	A	H	A	H	A	H
Result	W	W	D	D	L	D	L	L	D	W	L	L	L	L	L	D	L	W	L	D	L	W	W	L	W	D	L	L	L	L	L	D	W	D	L	W	L	L
Position	2	2	3	3	6	6	11	15	15	14	14	15	15	18	18	17	18	16	16	15	16	15	15	15	15	15	15	16	17	17	17	18	17	17	17	16	16	17

Source: Ligue 1
A = Away; H = Home; W = Win; D = Draw; L = Loss

==== Matches ====
The league fixtures were announced on 25 June 2021.

8 August 2021 1	Bordeaux	0–2	Clermont	Bordeaux
15:00 CEST (UTC+2)	Kalu (yellow card) 35'	Report	Bayo 82'; Dossou 90+2'	Stadium: Matmut Atlantique; Attendance: 0 Referee: Florent Batta

15 August 2021 2	Clermont	2–0	Troyes	Clermont-Ferrand
15:00 CEST (UTC+2)	Mendy (yellow card) 45+1'; Bayo 53', 65'	Report	Kabore (yellow card) 19' (yellow-red card) 33'; Biancone (yellow card) 35'	Stadium: Stade Gabriel Montpied; Attendance: 11,005; Referee: Romain Lissorgue

22 August 2021 3	Lyon	3–3	Clermont	Décines-Charpieu
13:00 CEST (UTC+2)	Dembélé 5' (pen.), 21'; Bruno Guimarães (yellow card) 30'; Paquetá 45+1'; Toko Ekambi (yellow card) 45+3'	Report	Diomandé 12' (o.g.); Ogier (yellow card) 52'; Rashani 80', 90+1'; Abdul Samed (yellow card) 85'	Stadium: Parc Olympique Lyonnais; Attendance: 34,713; Referee: Thomas Léonard

29 August 2021 4	Clermont	2–2	Metz	Clermont-Ferrand
15:00 CEST (UTC+2)	Niakaté 34' (o.g.); Ogier (yellow card) 39'; Rashani 57'	Report	Niane 9' (pen.); Desmas 28' (o.g.); Sarr (yellow card) 29'; Alakouch (yellow card) 90'	Stadium: Stade Gabriel Montpied; Attendance: 11,296; Referee: Hakim Ben El Hadj

11 September 2021 5	Paris Saint-Germain	4–0	Clermont	Paris
17:00 CEST (UTC+2)	Herrera 20', 31'; Mbappé 55'; Gueye 65'	Report	Zedadka (yellow card) 10'	Stadium: Parc des Princes; Attendance: 47,329; Referee: Mikael Lesage

19 September 2021 6	Clermont	1–1	Brest	Clermont-Ferrand
15:00 CEST (UTC+2)	Rashani (yellow card) 19', (goal) 65'; Gastien (red card) 50'	Report	Agoumé (yellow card) 32'; Chardonnet 52'	Stadium: Stade Gabriel Montpied; Attendance: 11,224; Referee: Bastien Dechepy

22 September 2021 7	Rennes	6–0	Clermont	Rennes
19:00 CEST (UTC+2)	Martin 32'; Terrier 36'; Kamaldeen 55', 57', (yellow card) 66'; Laborde 64'; Tait 77'	Report	N'Simba (yellow card) 68'	Stadium: Roazhon Park; Attendance: 24,109; Referee: Benoît Bastien

26 September 2021 8	Clermont	1–3	Monaco	Clermont-Ferrand
17:00 CEST (UTC+2)	Bayo 6'; Abdul Samed (yellow card) 35'; Gastien (yellow card) 54'	Report	Ben Yedder 25'; Pavlović (yellow card) 29'; Tchouaméni (yellow card) 45'; Volland 48', (yellow card) 70'; Diop (yellow card) 84', (goal) 90+1'	Stadium: Stade Gabriel Montpied; Attendance: 11,529; Referee: Benoît Millot

3 October 2021 9	Lorient	1–1	Clermont	Lorient
15:00 CEST (UTC+2)	Laporte 54', (yellow card) 79'; Jenz (yellow card) 55'	Report	Bayo 15'; Gastien (yellow card) 24'	Stadium: Stade du Moustoir; Attendance: 12,611; Referee: Pierre Gaillouste

16 October 2021 10	Clermont	1–0	Lille	Clermont-Ferrand
17:00 CEST (UTC+2)	N'Simba 32'; Tell (yellow card) 85'	Report	Sanches (yellow card) 32'; Xeka (yellow card) 57'; André (yellow card) 90+2'	Stadium: Stade Gabriel Montpied; Attendance: 11,537; Referee: Eric Wattellier

23 October 2021 11	Nantes	2–1	Clermont	Nantes
17:00 CEST (UTC+2)	Fábio (yellow card) 36'; Girotto 38'; Corchia (red card) 39'; Blas 61'	Report	Gastien (red card) 30'; Bayo 49'	Stadium: Stade de la Beaujoire; Attendance: 19,968; Referee: Romain Lissorgue

31 October 2021 12	Clermont	0–1	Marseille	Clermont-Ferrand
20:45 CET (UTC+1)	Khaoui (yellow card) 53'	Report	Guendouzi (yellow card) 24'; Ünder 25'; Saliba (yellow card) 40'; Balerdi (yellow card) 43'; De la Fuente (yellow card) 56'	Stadium: Stade Gabriel Montpied; Attendance: 12,240; Referee: Benoît Millot

7 November 2021 13	Saint-Étienne	3–2	Clermont	Saint-Étienne
15:00 CET (UTC+1)	Trauco (yellow card) 72'; Nordin 78'; Krasso 90+2'; Sow 90+4'	Report	Bayo 59'; Berthomier 64'	Stadium: Stade Geoffroy-Guichard; Attendance: 0 Referee: Pierre Gaillouste

21 November 2021 14	Clermont	1–2	Nice	Clermont-Ferrand
17:00 CET (UTC+1)	Ogier 17'; Abdul Samed (yellow card) 53'	Report	Gouiri (yellow card) 32', (goal) 76', 82'; Rosario (yellow card) 53'; Lemina (yellow card) 65'; Delort (yellow card) 79'	Stadium: Stade Gabriel Montpied; Attendance: 11,683; Referee: Stéphanie Frappart

28 November 2021 15	Reims	1–0	Clermont	Reims
15:00 CET (UTC+1)	Touré (yellow card) 16'; Matusiwa (yellow card) 26'; Konan 90+1'	Report	Zedadka (yellow card) 73'; Allevinah (yellow card) 85'	Stadium: Stade Auguste Delaune; Attendance: 8,420; Referee: Benoît Bastien

1 December 2021 16	Clermont	2–2	Lens	Clermont-Ferrand
21:00 CET (UTC+1)	Gastien (yellow card) 9'; Ogier (yellow card) 38'; Magnin 41'; Bayo 65'; Hamel (yellow card) 81'; Diaby (red card) 84'; Dossou (yellow card) 86'	Report	Gastien 12' (o.g.); Danso (yellow card) 15'; Haïdara (yellow card) 36'; Fofana 47'; Clauss (yellow card) 56'; Frankowski (yellow card) 69'; Jean (yellow card) 90+5'	Stadium: Stade Gabriel Montpied; Attendance: 11,948; Referee: Amaury Delerue

5 December 2021 17	Montpellier	1–0	Clermont	Montpellier
15:00 CET (UTC+1)	Wahi 28'; Mavididi (yellow card) 38'; Sambia (yellow card) 50'; Chotard (yellow card) 90'	Report	Abdul Samed (yellow card) 51' (yellow-red card) 90+3'; Gastien (yellow card) 90+3'	Stadium: Stade de la Mosson; Attendance: 9,643; Referee: Florent Batta

12 December 2021 18	Angers	0–1	Clermont	Angers
15:00 CET (UTC+1)	Thomas (yellow card) 90'	Report	Magnin (yellow card) 64'; Bayo 84' (pen.); Diaby (yellow card) 90+5'	Stadium: Stade Raymond Kopa; Attendance: 8,149; Referee: Jeremy Stinat

9 January 2022 20	Clermont	0–0	Reims	Clermont-Ferrand
15:00 CET (UTC+1)	Seidu (red card) 14'; Hamel (yellow card) 35'	Report	Locko (yellow card) 25'; Busi (yellow card) 58'; Adeline (yellow card) 78'	Stadium: Stade Gabriel Montpied; Attendance: 4,524; Referee: Florent Batta

16 January 2022 21	Monaco	4–0	Clermont	Monaco
15:00 CET (UTC+1)	Diop 45+2'; Ben Yedder 55', 62' (pen.); Caio 83'	Report	Abdul Samed (yellow card) 56'	Stadium: Stade Louis II; Attendance: 2,633; Referee: Jérémy Stinat

19 January 2022 19	Clermont	0–2	Strasbourg	Clermont-Ferrand
19:00 CET (UTC+1)	N'Simba (yellow card) 60'; Dossou (yellow card) 80'	Report	Gameiro 44'; Hountondji 77' (o.g.)	Stadium: Stade Gabriel Montpied; Attendance: 4,219; Referee: Bastien Dechepy
Note: The match was originally scheduled for 22 December 2021, but was postponed to 19 January 2022 due to fog.

23 January 2022 22	Clermont	2–1	Rennes	Clermont-Ferrand
15:00 CET (UTC+1)	Abdul Samed (yellow card) 44'; Da Cunha 60'; Tell 71'; Hountondji (yellow card) 90+1'	Report	Santamaria 19'; Truffert (yellow card) 65'; Martin (yellow card) 75'; Ugochukwu (yellow card) 86'	Stadium: Stade Gabriel Montpied; Attendance: 4,535; Referee: Thomas Léonard

6 February 2022 23	Nice	0–1	Clermont	Nice
15:00 CET (UTC+1)	Boudaoui (yellow card) 26'	Report	Rashani (yellow card) 53', (goal) 77'	Stadium: Allianz Riviera; Attendance: 18,022; Referee: Jérôme Brisard

13 February 2022 24	Clermont	1–2	Saint-Étienne	Clermont-Ferrand
15:00 CET (UTC+1)	Hountondji (yellow card) 19', (goal) 39'; Gastien (yellow card) 52'; Seidu (yellow card) 90+1'; Zedadka (yellow card) 90+4'	Report	Boudebouz (yellow card) 15'; Camara 71'; Kolodziejczak 82'	Stadium: Stade Gabriel Montpied; Attendance: 12,131; Referee: Ruddy Buquet

20 February 2022 25	Marseille	0–2	Clermont	Marseille
20:45 CET (UTC+1)	Guendouzi (yellow card) 68'; Ćaleta-Car (yellow card) 75'	Report	Bayo 13'; Seidu (yellow card) 68'; Allevinah 84'; Kyei (yellow card) 88'	Stadium: Stade Vélodrome; Attendance: 53,840; Referee: Willy Delajod

27 February 2022 26	Clermont	1–1	Bordeaux	Clermont-Ferrand
15:00 CET (UTC+1)	Rashani 32'; Abdul Samed (yellow card) 48'	Report	Guilavogui 13'; Ahmedhodžić (yellow card) 44'; Marcelo (yellow card) 76'	Stadium: Stade Gabriel Montpied; Attendance: 12,032; Referee: Eric Wattellier

6 March 2022 27	Lille	4–0	Clermont	Villeneuve-d'Ascq
17:05 CET (UTC+1)	Bamba 3'; Ben Arfa (yellow card) 50'; David 72'; Çelik 84'; Zhegrova 90'	Report	Abdul Samed (yellow card) 36' (yellow-red card) 68'; Seidu (yellow card) 66'	Stadium: Stade Pierre-Mauroy; Attendance: 33,515; Referee: Thomas Léonard

13 March 2022 28	Clermont	0–2	Lorient	Clermont-Ferrand
15:00 CET (UTC+1)	Gastien (yellow card) 49'	Report	Innocent (yellow card) 53'; Koné 72', (yellow card) 83'; Pétrot 76'	Stadium: Stade Gabriel Montpied; Attendance: 11,359; Referee: Bastien Dechepy

19 March 2022 29	Lens	3–1	Clermont	Lens
17:00 CET (UTC+1)	Danso 39'; Sotoca 45+3'; Haïdara 58', (yellow card) 82'	Report	Rashani 9'; Dossou (yellow card) 89'	Stadium: Stade Bollaert-Delelis; Attendance: 36,182; Referee: Jérémy Stinat

3 April 2022 30	Clermont	2–3	Nantes	Clermont-Ferrand
15:00 CEST (UTC+2)	Abdul Samed (yellow card) 30', (goal) 63', (red card) 72'; Ogier (yellow card) 34'; Magnin (yellow card) 43'; Khaoui 58'; Zedadka (yellow card) 88'; Seidu (yellow card) 90+3'	Report	Girotto (yellow card) 35'; Blas 43' (pen.); Chirivella 62'; Kolo Muani 67'	Stadium: Stade Gabriel Montpied; Attendance: 11,785; Referee: Mikael Lesage

9 April 2022 31	Clermont	1–6	Paris Saint-Germain	Clermont-Ferrand
21:00 CEST (UTC+2)	Dossou 42'; Gastien (yellow card) 70'	Report	Neymar 6', 71' (pen.), 83', (yellow card) 53'; Mbappé 19', 74', 80'	Stadium: Stade Gabriel Montpied; Attendance: 12,664; Referee: Eric Wattellier

17 April 2022 32	Metz	1–1	Clermont	Metz
15:00 CEST (UTC+2)	De Préville 54'; Niane (red card) 40'; Bronn (yellow card) 72'	Report	Dossou 37'; Ogier (yellow card) 84'	Stadium: Stade Saint-Symphorien; Attendance: 14,335; Referee: Pierre Gaillouste

20 April 2022 33	Troyes	0–1	Clermont	Troyes
19:00 CEST (UTC+2)	Mothiba (yellow card) 4'; Kaboré (yellow card) 61'; Baldé (red card) 85'; Moulin (yellow card) 90+4'	Report	Seidu (yellow card) 37' (yellow-red card) 70'; Billong (yellow card) 48'; Bayo (yellow card) 63', (goal) 88'; Dossou (yellow card) 70'; Djoco (yellow card) 76'	Stadium: Stade de l'Aube; Attendance: 8,124; Referee: Jérémie Pignard

24 April 2022 34	Clermont	2–2	Angers	Clermont-Ferrand
15:00 CEST (UTC+2)	Bayo 71'; Da Cunha 82'	Report	Thomas (yellow card) 34'; Cho 37', (yellow card) 62' (yellow-red card) 75'; Bentaleb (yellow card) 38'; Traoré 44'; Bamba (yellow card) 61'; Mendy (yellow card) 90'	Stadium: Stade Gabriel Montpied; Attendance: 11,531; Referee: Stéphanie Frappart

1 May 2022 35	Brest	2–0	Clermont	Brest
15:00 CEST (UTC+2)	Del Castillo (red card) 22'; Belaïli (yellow card) 30'; Brassier 60'; Mounié 62'; Saïd (yellow card) 90+1'	Report	Ogier (yellow card) 28'; N'Simba (yellow card) 45+1'	Stadium: Stade Francis-Le Blé; Attendance: 10,592; Referee: Romain Lissorgue

8 May 2022 36	Clermont	2–1	Montpellier	Clermont-Ferrand
15:00 CEST (UTC+2)	Rashani 4'; Abdul Samed (yellow card) 35'; Gastien (yellow card) 60'; Bayo 69' (pen.)	Report	Mollet (yellow card) 24'; Chotard 32', (yellow card) 74'; Souquet (yellow card) 71'; Leroy (yellow card) 74'	Stadium: Stade Gabriel Montpied; Attendance: 11,857; Referee: Benoît Bastien

14 May 2022 37	Strasbourg	1–0	Clermont	Strasbourg
21:00 CEST (UTC+2)	Thomasson 28'; Liénard (yellow card) 34'	Report	Zedadka (yellow card) 10'; Seidu (yellow card) 48'	Stadium: Stade de la Meinau; Attendance: 25,231; Referee: Benoît Millot

21 May 2022 38	Clermont	1–2	Lyon	Clermont-Ferrand
21:00 CEST (UTC+2)	N'Simba (yellow card) 26'; Bayo (penalty missed) 59', 59'; Rashani (yellow card) 90'	Report	Dembélé 27', (yellow card) 90+4'; Henrique (yellow card) 39'; Aouar 48'	Stadium: Stade Gabriel Montpied; Attendance: 12,306; Referee: Mikael Lesage

=== Coupe de France ===
18 December 2021 Round of 64	JS Chemin Bas d'Avignon	0–4	Clermont	Nîmes
16:00 CET (UTC+1)	Outaleb (yellow card) 31'	Report	Tell 32' (pen.), 58' (pen.), (yellow card) 62'; Khaoui 34'; Iglesias 42'	Stadium: Stade des Costières; Referee: Mathieu Vernice

2 January 2022 Round of 32	Bastia	2–0	Clermont	Furiani
16:00 CET (UTC+1)	Santelli 25'; Sainati (yellow card) 51'; Robic 70'	Report	Gastien (yellow card) 30'; Hamel (yellow card) 41'	Stadium: Stade Armand-Cesari; Attendance: 7,000; Referee: Pierre Gaillouste

== Statistics ==
=== Goalscorers ===
As of 15 August 2021

Rank	No.	Pos.	Nat.	Name	Ligue 1	Coupe de France	Total
1	27	FW	(Guinea)	Mohamed Bayo	3	0	3
2	24	MF	(Benin)	Jodel Dossou	1	0	1
Totals					4	0	4
