= Bouzar =

Bouzar (Arabic: بوزار or بوذر) is an Arabic surname, primarily found in Algeria. Notable people with the surname include:

- Dounia Bouzar (born 1964), French anthropologist, writer and educator of Algerian-French descent
- Samir Bouzar (born 1999), French footballer

== See also ==
- Biyouna, born Baya Bouzar (1952–2025), Algerian singer, dancer and actress
