= Jim Allevinah =

Footballer (born 1995)

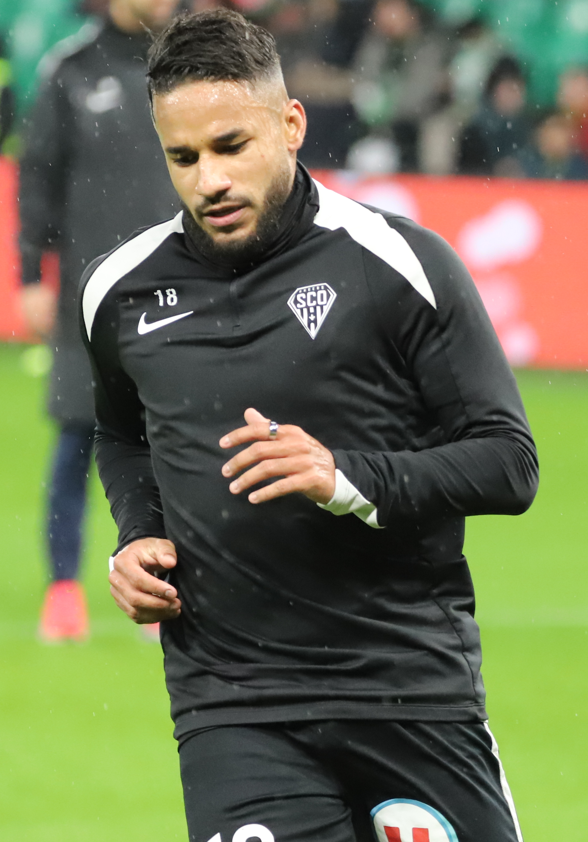
- Allevinah with Angers in 2025

Personal information
- Full name: Jim Émilien Ngowet Allevinah
- Date of birth: 27 February 1995 (age 31)
- Place of birth: Agen, France
- Height: 1.72 m (5 ft 8 in)
- Position: Winger

Team information
- Current team: Angers
- Number: 18

Youth career
- -2014: Entente Boé-Bon-Encontre

Senior career*
Years	Team	Apps	(Gls)
2014–2015	Agen		
2015–2016	Marmande	20	(4)
2016–2018	Bayonne	47	(15)
2018–2019	Le Puy	26	(2)
2019–2024	Clermont	155	(18)
2024–	Angers	34	(2)
2026	→ Kasımpaşa (loan)	8	(1)

International career^{‡}
2019–	Gabon	36	(10)
- * Club domestic league appearances and goals as of 10 June 2026 ‡ National team caps and goals as of 24 December 2025

Jim Émilien Ngowet Allevinah (born 27 February 1995) is a professional footballer who plays as a winger for Ligue 1 club Angers. Born in France, he plays for the Gabon national team.

== Club career ==
=== Early career ===
Allevinah developed through local club Entente Boé-Bon-Encontre, playing mostly there until the age of 19, besides a brief spell in the youth ranks at Stade Montois. It was with this club that he made his senior debut in the eighth tier of French football, the Division d'Honneur Régionale, also playing for them in the ninth tier, the Promotion Honneur, before joining sixth tier side SU Agen in December 2014. His performances there drew the attention of CFA 2 (fourth tier) side Marmande, who he joined in June 2015. Good performances there drew attention from professional clubs Dijon and Bordeaux, who gave him a trial, though neither side ended up offering Allevniah a contract.

At the end of the 2015–16 season, he signed a contract with newly relegated CFA 2 side Bayonne. Following a strong season in the league, Ligue 2 side Nîmes Olympique offered him a trial, but he didn't end up signing with the club, instead remaining with Bayonne for another season, at the conclusion of which he moved to fellow CFA 2 side Le Puy, signing a two-year contract. Allevinah helped Le Puy gain promotion to the Championnat National, and his success with the side prompted Ligue 2 side Clermont Foot to sign him on a three-year contract for a fee of around €25,000.

=== Clermont Foot ===
Allevinah made his professional debut with Clermont Foot on the first match day of the 2019–20 season, in a match against Châteauroux, coming on as a substitute for Jason Berthomier in the 68th minute and winning a penalty, which was then converted by Adrian Grbic to complete a 3–0 victory for Clermont Foot.

=== Angers ===
On 27 May 2024, it was announced that Allevinah had signed a three-year contract with newly promoted Ligue 1 club Angers.

On 29 January 2026, he was loaned by Kasımpaşa in Turkey.

== International career ==
Born in France, Allevinah elected to represent Gabon at the senior international level. He made his international debut on 23 March 2019 against Burundi, starting and playing the full 90 minutes of the 1–1 draw, which eliminated Gabon from Africa Cup of Nations qualification.

On 5 September 2021, he scored his first goal in a 1–1 draw against Egypt in a FIFA World Cup qualifier. Two months later, he scored against Egypt again in the reverse fixture, which Egypt won 2–1.

Allevinah was selected for Gabon's 2021 Africa Cup of Nations squad. He played in all three of Gabon's group stage matches, scoring a late equalizer against Ghana and the opening goal of the draw against Morocco to help Gabon advance to the knockout stage, being eliminated via penalty shootout in the quarter finals by Burkina Faso.

== Career statistics ==
=== Club ===
As of 7 December 2025

Appearances and goals by club, season and competition
Club	Season	League			National cup		Other		Total	
Club	Season	Division	Apps	Goals	Apps	Goals	Apps	Goals	Apps	Goals
Marmande	2015–16	CFA 2	20	4	0	0	—		20	4
Bayonne	2016–17	CFA 2	22	6	0	0	—		22	6
Bayonne	2017–18	National 3	25	9	1	0	—		26	9
Bayonne	Total		47	15	1	0	—		48	15
Le Puy	2018–19	National 2	26	2	3	0	—		29	2
Clermont	2019–20	Ligue 2	22	2	0	0	0	0	22	2
Clermont	2020–21	Ligue 2	38	12	1	0	—		39	12
Clermont	2021–22	Ligue 1	30	1	0	0	—		30	1
Clermont	2022–23	Ligue 1	36	1	1	0	—		37	1
Clermont	2023–24	Ligue 1	29	2	2	1	—		31	3
Clermont	Total		155	18	4	1	0	0	159	19
Angers	2024–25	Ligue 1	28	1	3	0	—		31	1
Angers	2025–26	Ligue 1	4	0	0	0	—		4	0
Angers	Total		32	1	3	0	—		35	1
Career total			280	40	11	1	0	0	291	41

=== International ===
As of match played 24 December 2025

Appearances and goals by national team and year
National team	Year	Apps	Goals
Gabon	2019	5	0
Gabon	2020	3	0
Gabon	2021	5	2
Gabon	2022	6	4
Gabon	2023	5	1
Gabon	2024	6	1
Gabon	2025	6	2
Total		36	10

As of match played 6 June 2025. Gabon score listed first, score column indicates score after each Allevinah goal.

List of international goals scored by Jim Allevinah
No.	Date	Venue	Opponent	Score	Result	Competition
1	5 September 2021	Stade de Franceville, Franceville, Gabon	Egypt	1–0	1–1	2022 FIFA World Cup qualification
2	16 November 2021	Borg El Arab Stadium, Alexandria, Egypt	Egypt	1–1	1–2	2022 FIFA World Cup qualification
3	14 January 2022	Ahmadou Ahidjo Stadium, Yaoundé, Cameroon	Ghana	1–1	1–1	2021 Africa Cup of Nations
4	18 January 2022	Stade Ahmadou Ahidjo, Yaoundé, Cameroon	Morocco	1–0	2–2	2021 Africa Cup of Nations
5	20 November 2022	Atilla Vehbi Konuk Tesisleri, Antalya, Turkey	Niger	1–0	3–1	Friendly
6	20 November 2022	Atilla Vehbi Konuk Tesisleri, Antalya, Turkey	Niger	2–0	3–1	Friendly
7	19 November 2023	Benjamin Mkapa Stadium, Dar es Salaam, Tanzania	Burundi	1–0	2–1	2026 FIFA World Cup qualification
8	11 June 2024	Stade de Franceville, Franceville, Gabon	Gambia	1–1	3–2	2026 FIFA World Cup qualification
9	20 March 2025	Stade de Franceville, Franceville, Gabon	Seychelles	1–0	3–0	2026 FIFA World Cup qualification
10	6 June 2025	Père Jégo Stadium, Casablanca, Morocco	Niger	1–1	3–4	Friendly
