= Mohamed Bayo =

Guinean footballer (born 1998)

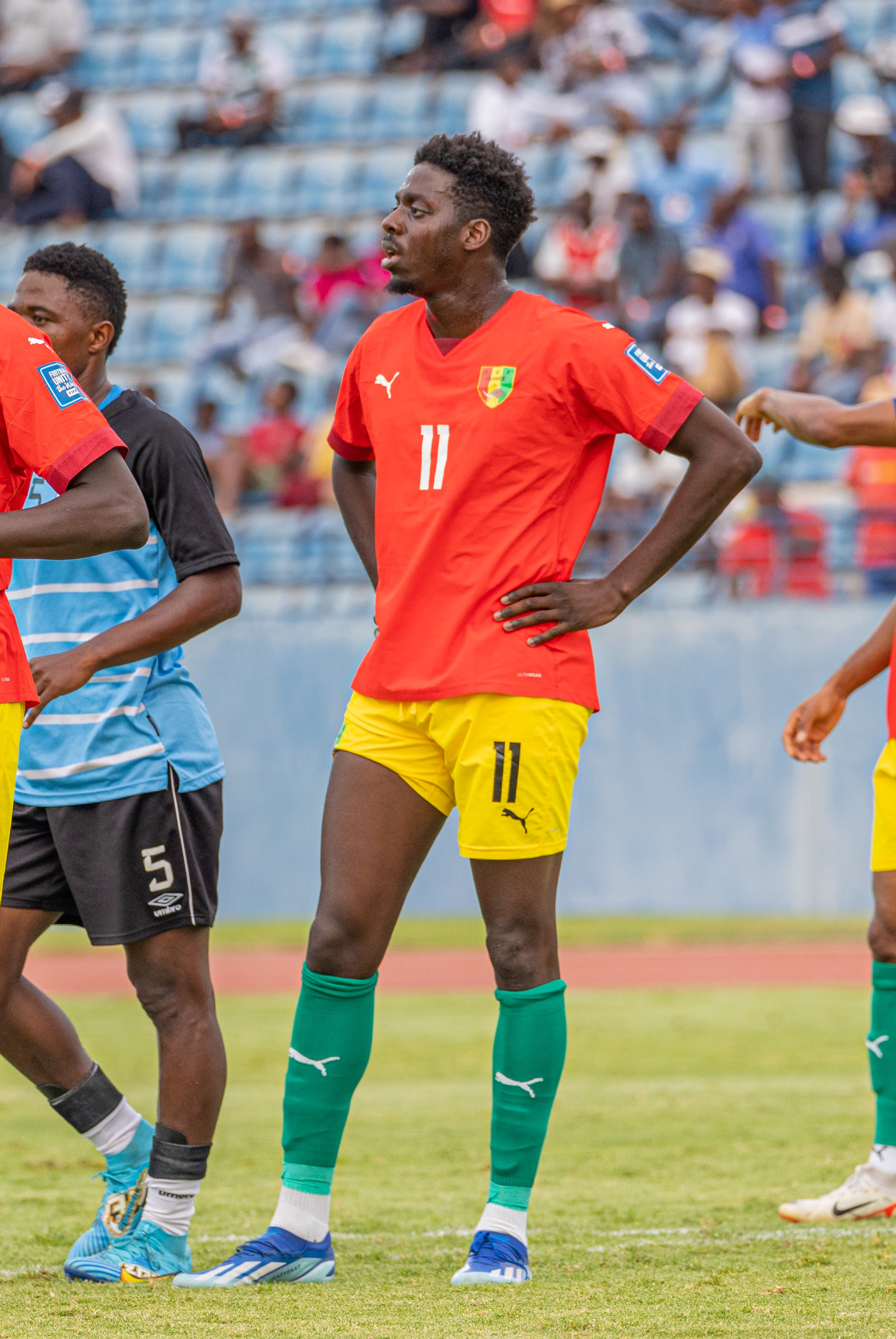
- Bayo playing for Guinea in 2023

Personal information
- Date of birth: 4 June 1998 (age 28)
- Place of birth: Clermont-Ferrand, France
- Height: 1.88 m (6 ft 2 in)
- Position: Forward

Team information
- Current team: Samsunspor
- Number: 18

Youth career
- 2004–2018: Clermont

Senior career*
Years	Team	Apps	(Gls)
2016–2020	Clermont B	28	(15)
2018–2022	Clermont	75	(36)
2019–2020	→ Dunkerque (loan)	34	(14)
2022–2026	Lille	39	(6)
2023–2024	→ Le Havre (loan)	22	(5)
2025	→ Antwerp (loan)	16	(1)
2025–2026	→ Gaziantep (loan)	29	(15)
2026–	Samsunspor	0	(0)

International career^{‡}
2021–	Guinea	30	(8)
- * Club domestic league appearances and goals as of 22 May 2026 ‡ National team caps and goals as of 20:10, 22 October 2024 (UTC)

Mohamed Bayo (born 4 June 1998) is a professional footballer who plays as a forward for Süper Lig club Samsunspor in Turkey. Born in France, he plays for the Guinea national team.

== Early life ==
Bayo was born in Clermont-Ferrand, France, to Guinean parents.

== Club career ==
=== Early career ===
In January 2019, Bayo was loaned from Clermont, where he became professional, to Dunkerque until the end of the season. On 25 June 2019, Dunkerque extended the loan for the duration of the 2019–20 season.

=== Clermont ===
In the 2020–21 season, Bayo helped his hometown club Clermont achieve promotion to Ligue 1 for the first time by finishing as Ligue 2 top scorer with 22 goals.

=== Lille ===
On 13 July 2022, Bayo joined Ligue 1 side Lille on a five-year deal.

On 3 February 2025, Bayo moved on loan to Antwerp in Belgium until the end of the season. On 31 August 2025, Bayo joined Gaziantep in Turkey on loan.

=== Samsunspor ===
On 4 September 2026, Bayo returned to Turkey and signed a four-year contract (with an optional fifth year) with Samsunspor.

== International career ==
Bayo holds French and Guinean nationalities. He debuted with the Guinea national team in a 1–0 2021 Africa Cup of Nations qualification win over Mali on 24 March 2021.

On 20 December 2021, he was selected from the list of 27 Guinean players selected by Kaba Diawara to compete in the 2021 Africa Cup of Nations. On 23 December 2023 he was again included in the list of 25 players selected for the 2023 Africa Cup of Nations.

== Personal life ==
In October 2021, Bayo was taken into police custody in France after a hit-and-run following a traffic accident.

== Career statistics ==
=== Club ===
As of match played 17 May 2026

Appearances and goals by club, season and competition
Club	Season	League			Coupe de France		Coupe de la Ligue		Europe		Total	
Club	Season	Division	Apps	Goals	Apps	Goals	Apps	Goals	Apps	Goals	Apps	Goals
Clermont	2017–18	Ligue 2	0	0	1	0	0	0	—		1	0
Clermont	2018–19	Ligue 2	5	0	2	0	2	1	—		9	1
Clermont	2020–21	Ligue 2	38	22	0	0	—		—		38	22
Clermont	2021–22	Ligue 1	32	14	0	0	—		—		32	14
Clermont	Total		75	36	3	0	2	1	—		80	37
Dunkerque (loan)	2018–19	Championnat National	10	2	0	0	—		—		10	2
Dunkerque (loan)	2019–20	Championnat National	24	12	0	0	2	2	—		26	14
Dunkerque (loan)	Total		34	14	0	0	2	2	—		36	16
Lille	2022–23	Ligue 1	27	4	3	1	—		—		30	5
Lille	2024–25	Ligue 1	12	2	0	0	—		5 (Note: Appearance in UEFA Champions League)	0	17	2
Lille	2026–27	Ligue 1	0	0	0	0	—		0	0	0	0
Lille	Total		39	6	3	1	—		5	0	47	7
Le Havre (loan)	2023–24	Ligue 1	22	5	1	0	—		—		23	5
Antwerp (loan)	2024–25	Belgian Pro League	16	1	1	0	—		—		17	0
Gaziantep (loan)	2025–26	Süper Lig	29	15	3	0	—		—		32	15
Career total			215	77	11	1	4	3	5	0	235	80

=== International ===
As of match played 16 October 2024

Appearances and goals by national team and year
National team	Year	Apps	Goals
Guinea	2021	5	2
Guinea	2022	8	1
Guinea	2023	5	1
Guinea	2024	12	4
Total		30	8

As of match played 10 September 2024
Scores and results list Guinea's goal tally first, score column indicates score after each Bayo goal.

List of international goals scored by Mohamed Bayo
No.	Date	Venue	Cap	Opponent	Score	Result	Competition
1	6 October 2021	Marrakesh Stadium, Marrakesh, Morocco	3	Sudan	1–0	1–1	2022 FIFA World Cup qualification
2	9 October 2021	Stade Adrar, Agadir, Morocco	4	Sudan	2–1	2–2	2022 FIFA World Cup qualification
3	6 January 2022	Amahoro Stadium, Kigali, Rwanda	7	Rwanda	1–0	2–0	Friendly
4	24 March 2023	Stade Mohammed V, Casablanca, Morocco	14	Ethiopia	2–0	2–0	2023 Africa Cup of Nations qualification
5	15 January 2024	Charles Konan Banny Stadium, Yamoussoukro, Ivory Coast	20	Cameroon	1–0	1–1	2023 Africa Cup of Nations
6	28 January 2024	Alassane Ouattara Stadium, Abidjan, Ivory Coast	23	Equatorial Guinea	1–0	1–0	2023 Africa Cup of Nations
7	2 February 2024	Alassane Ouattara Stadium, Abidjan, Ivory Coast	24	DR Congo	1–0	1–3	2023 Africa Cup of Nations
8	10 September 2024	Charles Konan Banny Stadium, Yamoussoukro, Ivory Coast	28	Tanzania	1–0	1–2	2025 Africa Cup of Nations qualification

== Honours ==
Individual

- Ligue 2 top scorer: 2020–21 (22 goals)
- UNFP Ligue 2 Team of the Year: 2020–21
- UNFP Ligue 2 Player of the Month: February 2021
