= José Souto =

Spanish-born French footballer and manager (1959–2019)

Personal information
- Date of birth: 20 December 1959
- Place of birth: Arzúa, Spain
- Date of death: 15 January 2019 (aged 59)
- Place of death: Metz, France
- Height: 1.70 m (5 ft 7 in)
- Position: Defensive midfielder

Senior career*
Years	Team	Apps	(Gls)
1976–1977	Thionville		
1977–1981	Metz	45	(5)
1979–1980	→ Thionville (loan)	34	(8)
1981–1984	Laval	98	(12)
1984–1986	Strasbourg	67	(5)
1986–1987	Tours	31	(4)
1987–1988	Lens	35	(4)
1988–1990	Quimper	19	(1)
1990–1994	Thionville		
Total		329	(39)

Managerial career
- 1992–2000: Thionville
- * Club domestic league appearances and goals

José Souto (20 December 1959 – 15 January 2019) was a French professional football player and manager.

== Early and personal life ==
Souto was born in Arzúa, Spain. He was married with two children. He was also an amateur tennis player.

== Career ==
Souto played as a defensive midfielder for Thionville, Metz, Laval, Strasbourg, Tours, Lens and Quimper.

He also served as manager of Thionville between 1992 and 2000.

== Later life and death ==
He later worked as a consultant for TV channels Orange Sport and beIN Sports.

He died on 15 January 2019, at the age of 59.
