= Jonathan Iglesias =

Uruguayan footballer (born 1988)

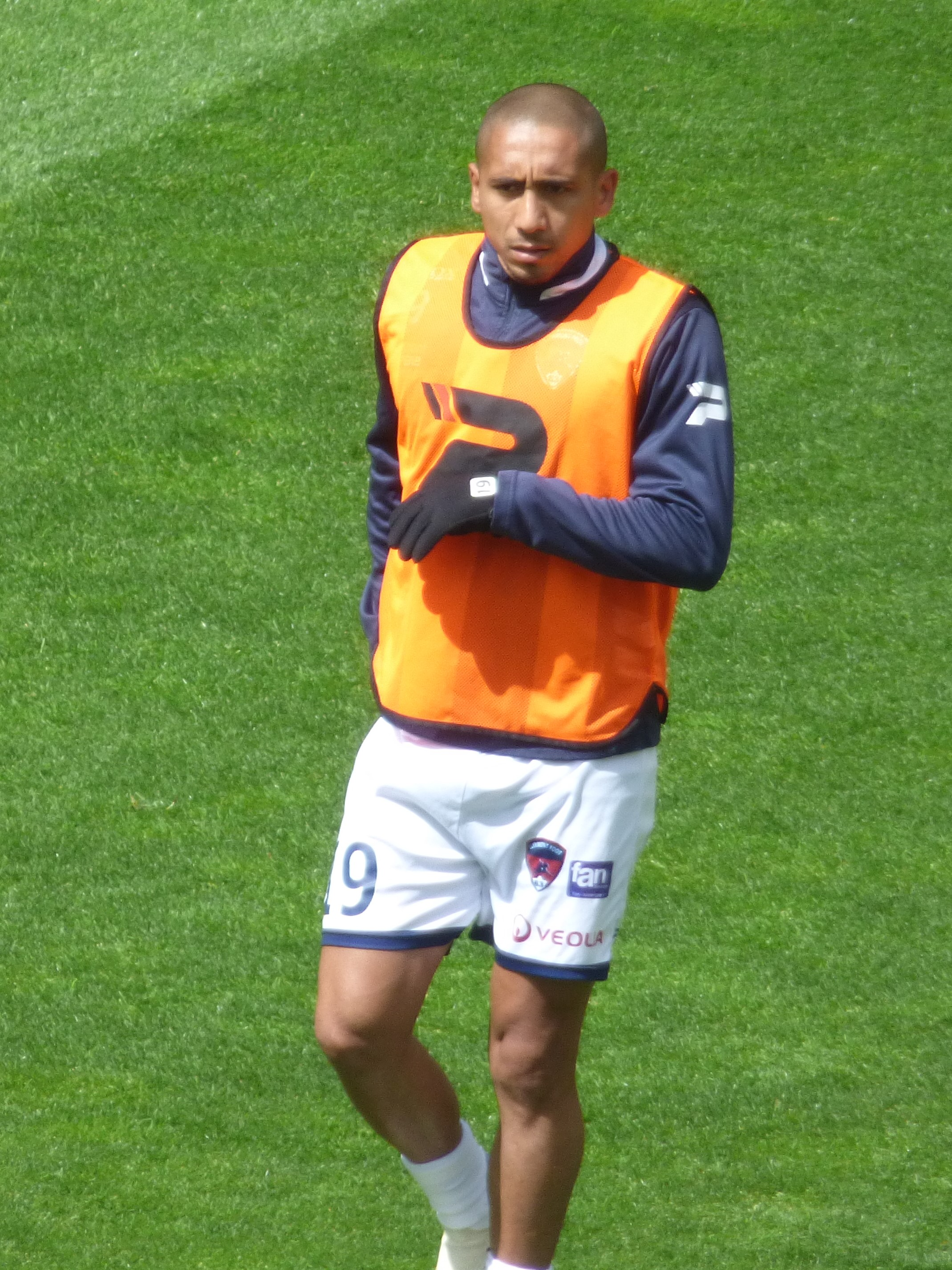
- Iglesias with Clermont in 2019

Personal information
- Full name: Jonathan Damián Iglesias Abreu
- Date of birth: 17 December 1988 (age 37)
- Place of birth: Montevideo, Uruguay
- Height: 1.70 m (5 ft 7 in)
- Position: Midfielder

Senior career*
Years	Team	Apps	(Gls)
2009	Progreso	1	(1)
2010–2011	Racing Club Montevideo	7	(0)
2011–2012	Rentistas	29	(1)
2012–2016	El Tanque Sisley	49	(5)
2014–2016	→ Nancy (loan)	52	(2)
2015–2016	→ Nancy II (loan)	3	(0)
2017–2022	Clermont	162	(10)
2022–2023	Paris FC	47	(4)
2023–2024	Guingamp	10	(0)
- * Club domestic league appearances and goals as of 15 June 2024, 14:54 (UTC)

Jonathan Damián Iglesias Abreu (born 17 December 1988) is a Uruguayan professional footballer who plays as a midfielder.

== Career ==
On 31 January 2017, Iglesias signed a contract with Clermont until the end of the 2016–17 season.

He acquired French nationality by naturalization on 9 July 2021.

On 3 January 2022, he signed for Paris FC on a contract until June 2023.

In July 2023, once his contract with the Parisian team ended, he joined Guingamp.

== Career statistics ==
As of the end 2023–24 season.

Appearances and goals by club, season and competition
Club	Season	League			Cup		League Cup		Other		Total	
Club	Season	Division	Apps	Goals	Apps	Goals	Apps	Goals	Apps	Goals	Apps	Goals
Racing de Montevideo	2010–11	Uruguayan Primera División	7	0	0	0	—				7	0
Rentistas	2011–12	Uruguayan Primera División	29	1	0	0	—		—		29	1
El Tanque Sisley	2012–13	Uruguayan Primera División	20	1	0	0	—		—		20	1
El Tanque Sisley	2013–14	Uruguayan Primera División	29	4	0	0	—		1 (Note: Appearance in the Copa Sudamericana)	0	30	4
El Tanque Sisley	Total		49	5	0	0	—		1	0	50	5
Nancy (loan)	2014–15	Ligue 2	33	0	2	0	2	0	—		37	0
Nancy (loan)	2015–16	Ligue 2	19	2	1	0	1	0	—		21	2
Nancy (loan)	Total		52	2	3	0	3	0	—		58	2
Nancy II (loan)	2015–16	CFA 2	3	0	—		—		—		3	0
Clermont	2016–17	Ligue 2	16	1	0	0	0	0	—		16	1
Clermont	2017–18	Ligue 2	34	2	1	0	1	0	—		36	2
Clermont	2018–19	Ligue 2	33	4	3	1	2	0	—		38	5
Clermont	2019–20	Ligue 2	28	1	1	0	1	0	—		30	1
Clermont	2020–21	Ligue 2	36	2	1	0	—				37	2
Clermont	2021–22	Ligue 1	15	0	1	1	—				16	1
Clermont	Total		162	10	7	2	4	0	—		173	12
Paris FC	2021–22	Ligue 2	17	1	0	0	—		1 (Note: Appearance in the Ligue 2 Promotion play-off)	0	18	1
Paris FC	2022–23	Ligue 2	29	3	4	0	—				33	3
Paris FC	Total		46	4	4	0	0	0	1	0	51	4
EA Guingamp	2023–24	Ligue 2	10	0	0	0	—				10	0
EA Guingamp	Total		10	0	0	0	0	0	—		10	0
Career total			358	22	14	2	7	0	2	0	381	24
