= Wilfried Bedfian =

Cameroonian footballer (born 2001)

Personal information
- Date of birth: 9 July 2001 (age 25)
- Place of birth: Paris, France
- Height: 1.88 m (6 ft 2 in)
- Position: Goalkeeper

Team information
- Current team: Thionville
- Number: 40

Youth career
- 2013–2017: Epinay-sur-Seine
- 2017–2018: Racing Club

Senior career*
Years	Team	Apps	(Gls)
2018–2021	Châteauroux II	29	(0)
2019–2021	Châteauroux	4	(0)
2022–2023	AG Caennaise	22	(0)
2023–2024	Chambly	2	(0)
2025–	Thionville	49	(0)

International career^{‡}
2021	Cameroon U20	1	(0)
2023	Cameroon U23	2	(0)
- * Club domestic league appearances and goals as of 5 September 2026 ‡ National team caps and goals as of 19:37, 1 April 2023 (UTC)

Wilfried Bedfian (born 9 July 2001) is a professional footballer who plays as a goalkeeper for Ligue 3 club Thionville. Born in France, he represents Cameroon internationally.

== Career ==
On 29 November 2018, Bedfian signed his first professional contract with Châteauroux. He made his professional debut with Châteauroux in a 3–1 Coupe de la Ligue loss to Chamois Niortais F.C. on 13 August 2019.

== International career ==
Born in France, Bedfian is of Cameroonian descent. He was called up to represent the Cameroon U20s at the 2021 Africa U-20 Cup of Nations. He played for the Cameroon U23s for a set of 2023 U-23 Africa Cup of Nations qualification matches in March 2023.
