= US Thionville Lusitanos =

Football club based in Thionville, France

- Full name: Union Sportive Thionville Lusitanos
- Founded: 1905; 121 years ago, as Fußball-Club Diedenhofen; 2021; 5 years ago, as US Thionville Lusitanos
- Stadium: Stade de la Plaine; Stade Jeanne d'Arc; Stade de Guentrange
- President: François Ventrici
- Manager: Julien François
- League: Ligue 3
- 2025–26: National 2 Group B, 1st of 16 (promoted)
- Website: https://www.ustl.fr/
Home colours	Away colours

Union Sportive Thionville Lusitanos is a football club based in Thionville, France. The club competes in Ligue 3, after winning promotion in the 2025–26 season.

== History ==
The football club was born in 1905 as Fußball-Club Diedenhofen. After the first world war it was renamed La Sportive Thionvilloise following the transfer of Thionville from Germany to France in accord with the Treaty of Versailles. During the second world war, between 1940 and 1945, with the Germans in charge of the area again, the club was renamed Turn-und-Sportgemeinschaft before reverting to its previous name.

In 1943, Fritz Walter played in the squad, who went on to win the World Cup in 1954 with West Germany.

In 1969 the club gained promotion to the national amateur division for the first time. They turned professional whilst in the second division for the two seasons 1979-1980 and 1980–1981. In the latter season they reached the quarter-finals of the French Cup, where they drew 2–2 at home, before losting 3–0 in the return leg against Martigues. They also reached the last 32 in the 1979–80, 1983–84 and 1997–98 seasons. In the second of the two second division seasons, the club declared bankruptcy and reformed in division 4 as Thionville Football Club

The club spent the rest of the 1980s and 1990s in either the fourth of fifth tier of the national pyramid, before relegation back to the regional level in 2000. They spend one further season at the national level in 2009–10.

On 2 May 2021, Thionville FC merged with Thionville AS Portugais Saint-François to create US Thionville Lusitanos. In 2023, the club achieved promotion back to the Championnat National 3.

In 2025–26, US Thionville Lusitanos secure promotion to Ligue 3 for the first time in their history from next season after finish top table at National 2 in Group B.

== Current squad ==
As of 6 September 2026

Note: Flags indicate national team as defined under FIFA eligibility rules; some limited exceptions apply. Players may hold more than one non-FIFA nationality.

No.	Pos.	Nation	Player
5	MF	CMR	Joseph Atangana
6	DF	BIH	Muamer Aljic
7	FW	FRA	Kylian Tubio
8	MF	FRA	Samed Kılıç
9	FW	FRA	Karim Bouhmidi
10	FW	HAI	Bryan Labissiere
11	MF	FRA	Gauthier Laurens
12	FW	TOG	Fadel Gobitaka
14	FW	FRA	Simon Kalambayi
15	DF	FRA	Cachito Wanduka
16	GK	FRA	Antonin Parisot
17	DF	FRA	David Luvualu

No.	Pos.	Nation	Player
19	DF	HAI	Victor Siat
20	DF	MLI	Bourama Diarra
21	FW	FRA	Alexis Gouletquer
22	MF	FRA	Jalil Moustaid
23	DF	FRA	Samir Bouzar
25	MF	FRA	Jérémy Lauratet
26	MF	FRA	Enzo Montet (on loan from Laval)
27	DF	FRA	Marly Rampont
29	DF	FRA	Jules Stebe
40	GK	CMR	Wilfried Bedfian
—	GK	SMR	Lyes Hoël

=== Out on loan ===
Note: Flags indicate national team as defined under FIFA eligibility rules; some limited exceptions apply. Players may hold more than one non-FIFA nationality.

No.	Pos.	Nation	Player
—	FW	FRA	Jules Vitoux (at Gazélec Ajaccio until 30 June 2027)

== Notable players ==
- (England) Bobby Brown
- (France) Rémi Himbert (youth)
- (Germany) Fritz Walter

== Club presidents ==
- Roger Hoffmann
- Jean-Marc Plez
- Christian Ragni
- Jean-Luc Bitard
- Pascal Dine
- Jean-François Geissler

== Managers ==
- 1976-1979: Rolland Ehrhardt
- 1979-December 1980: Robert Szczepaniak
- January 1980 – 1981: Pierre Flamion
- 1983-January 1987: Paweł Chodakowski
- February 1987 – 1987: Branko Tucač
- 1992-2000: José Souto
- 2000-2001: Gabriel Dalvit
- 2001-2003: Pascal Raspollini
- 2003-2006: Patrick Libot
- 2006-2007: Gabriel Dalvit
- 2008-2010: Eric Brusco
- June 2010 – 2012: Christophe Borbiconi
- November 2013-June 2018: Manu Cuccu
- 2019: David Fanzel

== Honours ==
- National Fourth Division Champion, Group East: 1984
- Lorraine Champions: 1923, 1925, 1928, 1961, 1977, 2009
- Honour Division Champions: 1927, 1932, 1938, 2016
- Lorraine Cup: 1925, 1929, 1964, 1983, 1993, 2008

== Naming history ==
- 1905–1919: Fußball-Club Diedenhofen
- 1919–1940: La Sportive Thionvilloise
- 1940–1945: Turn-und-Sportgemeinschaft
- 1945–1981: La Sportive Thionvilloise
- 1981–2021: Thionville Football Club
- 2021–present: Union Sportive Thionville Lusitanos
