= Lyes Hoël =

French-born Sammarinese footballer (born 2007)

Personal information
- Date of birth: 12 April 2007 (age 19)
- Place of birth: Thionville, France
- Height: 1.85 m (6 ft 1 in)
- Position: Goalkeeper

Team information
- Current team: Thionville Lusitanos
- Number: 30

Youth career
- –2020: FC Thionville
- 2020–2023: Metz
- 2023–2025: Thionville Lusitanos

Senior career*
Years	Team	Apps	(Gls)
2024–2026	Thionville Lusitanos B		
2024–	Thionville Lusitanos	0	(0)

International career^{‡}
2023–	San Marino U19	2	(0)
- * Club domestic league appearances and goals as of 07:40, 26 October 2026 (UTC) ‡ National team caps and goals as of 07:40, 26 October 2026 (UTC)

Lyes Hoël (born 12 April 2007) is a footballer who plays as a goalkeeper for Ligue 3 club Thionville Lusitanos. Born in France, he represents San Marino at youth level.

== Club career ==
Hoël began his career in the academy of FC Thionville, before joining the youth team of FC Metz in 2020, at the age of 13. In September 2023, he returned to Thionville with US Thionville Lusitanos, where he played for the club's youth teams and B-team in the Régional 1, including in a 7–1 win against Chaumont in May 2026 which saw Chaumont get relegated..

== International career ==
Hoël is eligible to represent France, Algeria, and San Marino. He has represented San Marino at youth level, making two appearances for the San Marino under-19 national team during 2024 and 2025 UEFA European Under-19 Championship qualification.

In March 2026, Hoël was called up to the San Marino national team for the first time, for matches against the Faroe Islands and Andorra.

== Personal life ==
Hoël's mother was born in France, of Algerian and Sammarinese background. His older brother Bilel currently plays football in Luxembourg, while his younger sister Lilya is a competitive swimmer.
