= Samir Bouzar =

French footballer (born 1999)

Personal information
- Full name: Samir Bouzar Essaidi
- Date of birth: 16 August 1999 (age 27)
- Place of birth: Nancy, France
- Height: 1.83 m (6 ft 0 in)
- Position: Midfielder

Team information
- Current team: Thionville
- Number: 23

Youth career
- 2005–2016: Laxou
- 2006–2018: Nancy

Senior career*
Years	Team	Apps	(Gls)
2016–2020	Nancy II	60	(1)
2018–2020	Nancy	1	(0)
2021–2023	Nancy II	27	(1)
2021–2023	Nancy	2	(0)
2023–	Thionville	89	(2)
- * Club domestic league appearances and goals as of 5 September 2026

Samir Bouzar Essaidi (born 16 August 1999) is a French professional footballer who plays as a midfielder for Ligue 3 club Thionville.

== Career ==
Bouzar made his professional debut with AS Nancy in a 2–1 Ligue 2 win over US Orléans on 30 November 2018.

== Personal life ==
Born in France, Bouzar is of Algerian descent.
