= Dounia Bouzar =

French anthropologist

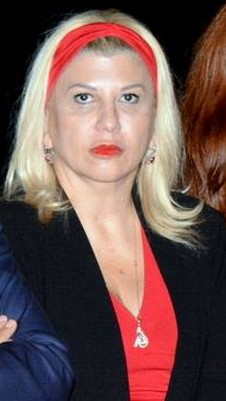
- Dounia Bouzar in 2016
- Born: Dominique Hélène Bouzar; 9 February 1964 (age 62); Grenoble, Isère, France
- Occupation: Anthropologist

Dominique Hélène Bouzar (born 9 February 1964), better known as Dounia Bouzar, is a French anthropologist, writer and educator who has worked towards better acceptance of Muslims, especially Muslim women, in France. She has held high-level posts where she has contributed to promoting the understanding of Muslims but has not always seen eye to eye with the authorities.

== Biography ==
Born in Grenoble, Bouzar is the daughter of an Algerian father and a French mother. She discontinued her secondary education before taking the baccalauréat matriculation. After the birth of her first daughter she took and passed the examination allowing her to undertake university studies. After a two-year course at the French Red Cross in Lyon, in 1991 she was able to join the PJJ (Judiciary Youth Protection) course at Tourcoing as an educator. In 1999, she continued her studies at the University of Lille III, leading to an M.Sc. in education.

Brought up in a secular environment, she first converted to Islam when she was 27, publishing her first works on the subject in 2001. Her L'une voilée, l'autre pas (One Veiled, One Not) led President Nicolas Sarkozy to appoint her a member of the French Council of the Muslim Faith in 2003. She left two years later, explaining that the council was not sufficiently concerned with fundamental issues. Instead she undertook a survey and analysis of Islam's place in French society, publishing Quelle éducation face au radicalisme? (What Education in the Face of Radicalism?) in 2006, for which she received an award from the Academy of Moral and Political Sciences.

Selected by Time as a Hero of the Year in 2005, the magazine quoted her concerns: "For years, political leaders and religious scholars have been defining who and what we are as French Muslims. It's up to us, as French citizens and practising Muslims, to tell them who we are and what we need." In the same article, she also criticized government proposals on the headscarf, explaining Muslim women would be deprived of their freedom of choice if it were to be banned.

In September 2013, Prime Minister Jean-Marc Ayrault appointed Bouzar a member of the Observatoire de la laïcité (Secularism Observatory) as a result of her work on secularism in companies with publications such as Allah, mon boss et moi (Allah, My Boss and Me, 2008) and Allah a-t-il sa place dans l'entreprise? (Does Allah have a Place in the Company?, 2009). She immediately suggested France should replace two Christian holidays with Yom Kippur for the Jews and Eid for the Muslims.

Faced with the problem of young Frenchmen being attracted to join ISIS in Syria, in April 2014 Bouzar founded the Centre de prévention des dérives sectaires liées à l'Islam (Centre for the Prevention of Sectarian Excesses Related to Islam) which initially had the support of the Ministry of the Interior. However, faced with the French government's intention to altar constitutional provisions on the French nationality, Bouzar severed the organization's connections with the ministry in February 2016, making it completely independent.

== Awards ==
Bouzar was honoured as a Chevalier de l'Ordre des Palmes Académiques in 2009 for her contributions to French cultural heritage. In 2014, the French politician Jean-Louis Bianco decorated her as a knight of the Legion of Honour.

== Works ==
- 1994: Et ici et là-bas, préf. Maryse Vaillant (dir.), Centre national de formation et d'études de la protection judiciaire de la jeunesse, ISBN 2-1108-7250-0
- 2001: L'islam des banlieues : Les prédicateurs musulmans, nouveaux travailleurs sociaux ?, Syros (maison d'édition)|Syros, Alternatives sociales, ISBN 2-84146-990-5
- 2002: À la fois française et musulmane, ill. Sylvia Bataille, La Martinière jeunesse, Oxygène, ISBN 2-7324-2830-2
- 2003: Être musulman aujourd'hui, ill. Frédéric Rébéna, La Martinière jeunesse, Hydrogène ISBN 2-7324-2957-0
- 2003: L'une voilée, l'autre pas, with Saïda Kada, Éditions Albin Michel, ISBN 2-226-13805-6
- 2004: Le voile, que cache-t-il ?, with Alain Houziaux (dir.), Jean Baubérot and Jacqueline Costa-Lascoux, Éditions de l'Atelier, Questions de vi, ISBN 2-7082-3771-3
- 2005: Ça suffit !, Éditions Denoël, Indigne, ISBN 2-207-25720-7
- 2006: Quelle éducation face au radicalisme religieux ?, préf. Michel Duvette, Éditions Dunod, Enfances / Protection de l'enfance, ISBN 2-10-007285-4
- 2006: Doctorate thesis: L'importance de l'expérience citoyenne dans le parcours des musulmans nés en France sensibles au discours de l'islam politique, with Pierre Bonte and Olivier Roy, Université Paris-VIII
- 2007: Être musulman aujourd'hui, ill. Frédéric Rébéna and Judith Gueyfier, La Martinière jeunesse, Hydrogène, ISBN 978-2-7324-3646-3
- 2007: L'intégrisme, l'islam et nous, Clara Dupont-Monod, Plon, ISBN 2-259-20696-4
- 2008: Allah, mon boss et moi, Dynamique diversité, ISBN 978-2-9531429-0-7
- 2009: Allah a-t-il sa place dans l'entreprise ?, with Lylia Bouzar, Éditions Albin Miche, ISBN 978-2-226-19324-7
- 2009: La République ou la burqa : Les services publics face à l'islam manipulé, with Lylia Bouzar, Éditions Albin Michel, ISBN 978-2-226-19599-9
- 2010: Laïcité, mode d'emploi : Cadre légal et solutions pratiques, 42 études de cas, Eyrolles, ISBN 978-2-212-54775-7
- 2013: Combattre le harcèlement au travail et décrypter les mécanismes de discrimination, à partir de l'expérience pionnière de Disneyland Paris, with Lylia Bouzar, Albin Michel.
- 2014: Désamorcer l'Islam radical. Ces dérives sectaires qui défigurent l'Islam, Les Éditions de l'Atelier, ISBN 9782708242647.
- 2014: Ils cherchent le paradis, ils ont trouvé l'enfer, Les éditions de l'atelier
- 2015: Comment sortir de l'emprise "djihadiste ?, Les éditions de l'atelier, Prix de l'essai L'Express 2015. ISBN 978-2-7082-4325-5.
- 2015: La vie après Daesh, Les éditions de l'Atelier, ISBN 978-2-7082-4324-8.
- 2016: Ma meilleure amie s'est fait embrigader, De la Martinière .
- 2017: Mon Djihad, itinéraire d'un repenti, Éditions Autrement.
