= Salis Abdul Samed =

Ghanaian footballer (born 2000)

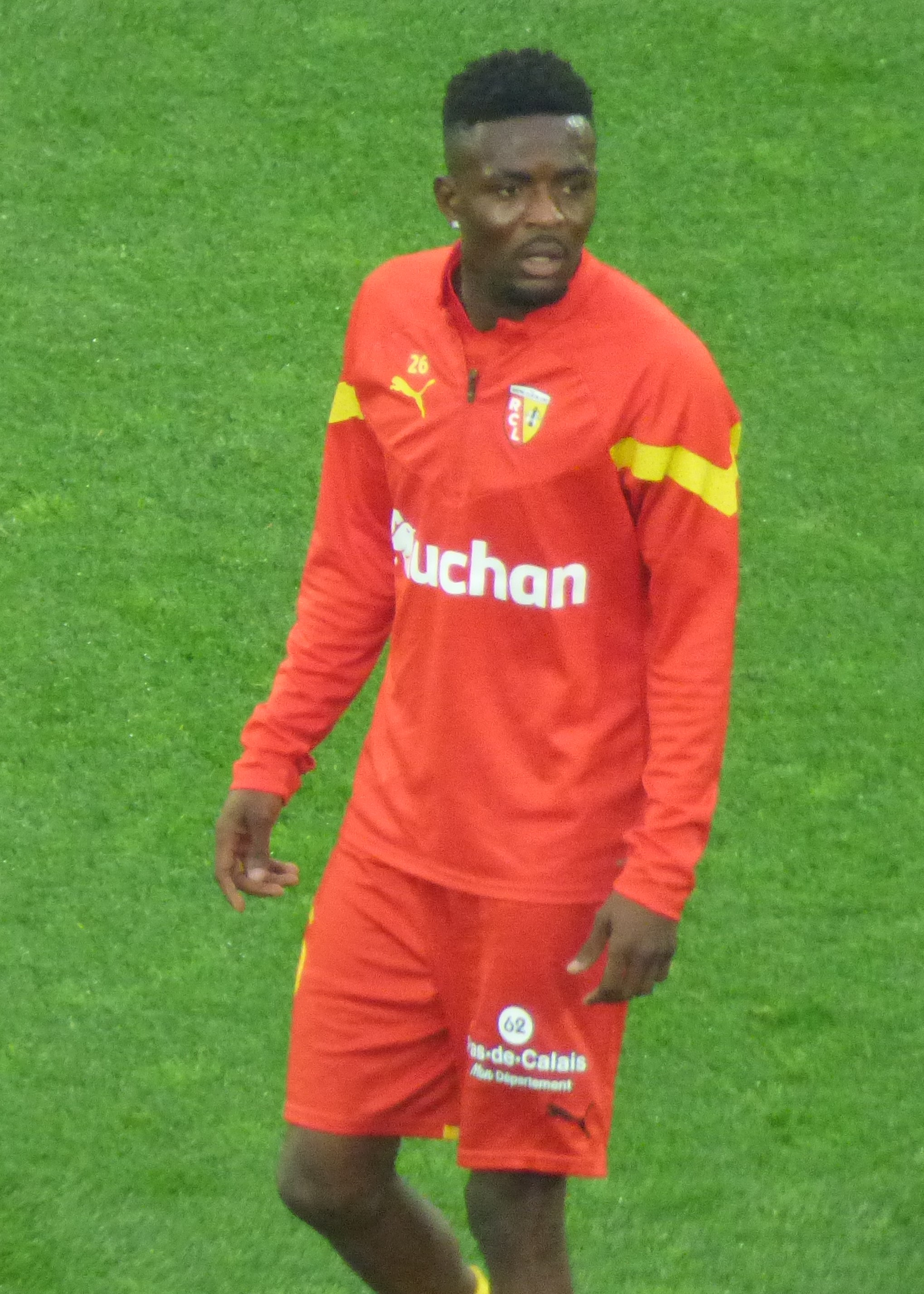
- Abdul Samed with Lens in 2023

Personal information
- Full name: Salis Abdul Samed
- Date of birth: 26 March 2000 (age 26)
- Place of birth: Accra, Ghana
- Height: 1.79 m (5 ft 10 in)
- Position: Defensive midfielder

Team information
- Current team: Nice
- Number: 99

Youth career
- JMG Academy

Senior career*
Years	Team	Apps	(Gls)
2019–2021	JMG Academy	0	(0)
2019–2021	→ Clermont (loan)	12	(0)
2021–2022	Clermont	31	(1)
2022–2025	Lens	60	(1)
2024–2025	→ Sunderland (loan)	10	(0)
2025–	Nice	18	(0)

International career^{‡}
2022–	Ghana	22	(0)
- * Club domestic league appearances and goals as of 23:03, 10 May 2026 (UTC) ‡ National team caps and goals as of 23:29, 4 September 2025 (UTC)

Salis Abdul Samed (born 26 March 2000) is a Ghanaian professional footballer who plays as a defensive midfielder for French Ligue 1 club Nice and the Ghana national team.

== Club career ==
=== Clermont ===
Abdul Samed played for JMG Academy originally in Accra, before later moving to the academy in Djékanou, Ivory Coast, after the Accra academy closed. On 24 July 2019, he joined Clermont on a two-year loan deal from the JMG Academy. He made his debut with the club in a 2–2 (5–4 on penalties) Coupe de la Ligue loss to Lens on 27 August 2019. Samed was part of the Clermont squad that earned promotion into the Ligue 1 after placing second in the 2019–20 Ligue 2. On 12 July 2021, Abdul Samed moved to Clermont on a permanent basis and signed a four-year contract.

=== Lens ===
On 24 June 2022, Abdul Samed signed for Lens in a transfer worth a reported €5 million. He signed a five-year contract with the club. He made his debut on the first match on 7 August, playing the full 90 minutes in Lens 3–2 victory over Brest. He scored his first goal on 31 August 2022 against Lorient. Samed ended the season, with 33 ligue one appearances starting 32 of those. He also started all their four Coupe de France matches as they reached the Quarter-finals and were eliminated by defending champions Nantes. He formed a formidable partnership with Lens captain Seko Fofana with the duo helping the club to place second in the Ligue 1, one point behind champions Paris Saint-Germain. The club's collective performance helped them secure a champions league spot for the first time in 20 years since 2002–03 season and the third time in the club's history. At the end of the season, he was named as the best central midfielder by French sports news outlet Get French Football News and in the outlet's team of the season. He was also nominated for the Prix Marc-Vivien Foé which was won by Chancel Mbemba.

On 8 June 2023, Samed extended his contract with Lens by an extra year, with his contract now set to expire in 2028.

==== Loan to Sunderland ====
On 30 August 2024, Samed signed for EFL Championship club Sunderland on a season-long loan deal. Due to injury Samed did not make his debut until 11 January 2025, in a 2–1 defeat to Stoke in the third round of the FA Cup.

=== Nice ===
On 14 August 2025, Samed moved to Nice.

== International career ==
Prior to the 2022 FIFA World Cup, he received his first call-up to the Ghana national team in November 2022. He made his debut against Switzerland in a pre-tournament friendly, starting and playing the full 90 minutes as Ghana won 2–0. In November 2022, Samed participated at the 2022 FIFA World Cup with the Ghana national team.

== Personal life ==
He is a Muslim and donated food items to Muslims in Madina during Ramadan in 2024.

== Career statistics ==
=== Club ===
As of match played 29 May 2026

Appearances and goals by club, season and competition
Club	Season	League			National cup (Note: Includes Coupe de France, FA Cup)		League cup (Note: Includes Coupe de la Ligue)		Europe		Other		Total	
Club	Season	Division	Apps	Goals	Apps	Goals	Apps	Goals	Apps	Goals	Apps	Goals	Apps	Goals
Clermont II	2019–20	Championnat National 3	7	0	—		—		—		—		7	0
Clermont II	2020–21	Championnat National 3	1	0	—		—		—		—		1	0
Clermont II	Total		8	0	—		—		—		—		8	0
Clermont (loan)	2019–20	Ligue 2	6	0	0	0	1	0	—		—		7	0
Clermont (loan)	2020–21	Ligue 2	6	0	0	0	—		—		—		6	0
Clermont (loan)	Total		12	0	0	0	1	0	—		—		13	0
Clermont	2021–22	Ligue 1	31	1	0	0	—		—		—		31	1
Lens	2022–23	Ligue 1	33	1	4	0	—		—		—		37	1
Lens	2023–24	Ligue 1	27	0	0	0	—		8 (Note: Six appearances in UEFA Champions League, two appearances in UEFA Europa League)	0	—		35	0
Lens	Total		60	1	4	0	—		8	0	—		72	1
Sunderland (loan)	2024–25	Championship	10	0	1	0	—		0	0	0	0	11	0
Nice	2025–26	Ligue 1	18	0	4	0	—		5 (Note: Appearances in UEFA Europa League)	0	1 (Note: Appearance in Ligue 1 relegation/promotion play-offs)	0	28	0
Career total			139	2	9	0	1	0	13	0	1	0	163	2

=== International ===
As of match played 4 September 2025

Appearances and goals by national team and year
National team	Year	Apps	Goals
Ghana	2022	4	0
Ghana	2023	8	0
Ghana	2024	7	0
Ghana	2025	3	0
Total		22	0

== Honours ==
Sunderland

- EFL Championship play-offs: 2025
