= Cédric Hountondji =

Footballer (born 1994)

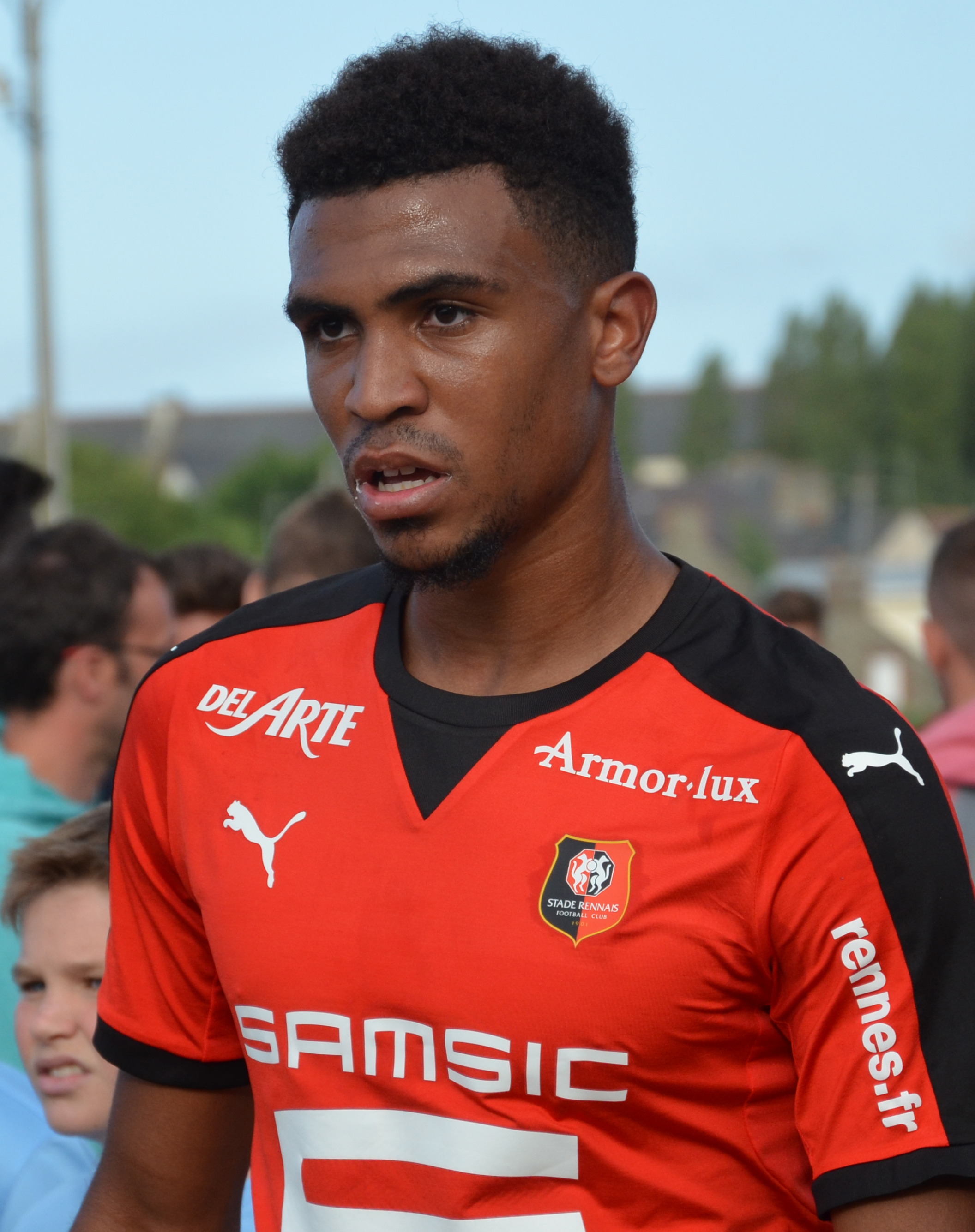
- Hountondji with Stade Rennais in 2015

Personal information
- Date of birth: 19 January 1994 (age 32)
- Place of birth: Toulouse, France
- Height: 1.95 m (6 ft 5 in)
- Position: Centre back

Team information
- Current team: Bandırmaspor
- Number: 4

Youth career
- 2001–2007: FCM Ingre
- 2007–2008: Orléans
- 2009–2013: Rennes

Senior career*
| Years | Team | Apps | (Gls) |
| 2013–2016 | Rennes | 18 | (1) |
| 2014–2015 | → Châteauroux (loan) | 30 | (0) |
| 2015–2016 | → Auxerre (loan) | 32 | (0) |
| 2016–2017 | Gazélec Ajaccio | 35 | (2) |
| 2018 | New York City | 1 | (0) |
| 2019 | Levski Sofia | 6 | (0) |
| 2019–2022 | Clermont | 81 | (2) |
| 2022–2025 | Angers | 71 | (0) |
| 2025– | Bandırmaspor | 11 | (0) |

International career^{‡}
| 2010 | France U16 | 2 | (0) |
| 2011 | France U17 | 1 | (0) |
| 2012 | France U18 | 1 | (0) |
| 2013 | France U21 | 1 | (0) |
| 2017– | Benin | 31 | (2) |
- * Club domestic league appearances and goals as of 5 May 2026 ‡ National team caps and goals as of 20 December 2024

Cédric Hountondji (born 19 January 1994) is a professional footballer who plays as a centre-back for Turkish TFF 1. Lig club Bandırmaspor. Born in France, he plays for the Benin national team.

== Club career ==
Hountondji came through the Rennes youth set-up and made his debut in Ligue 1 on 17 August 2013 against Nice in a 2–1 away defeat. He then spent time on loan at two Ligue 2 clubs, Châteauroux and Auxerre, before moving to fellow Ligue 2 side Gazélec Ajaccio in 2016.

He signed with New York City FC of Major League Soccer on 11 January 2018. He was waived by New York on 28 January 2019.

On 14 March 2019, Hountondji signed with Bulgarian club Levski Sofia until the end of the season with an option for extension.

On 18 July 2022, Hountondji joined Angers on a four-year contract.

== International career ==
Hountondji was born in France to a Beninese father and French mother, and holds dual citizenship. He represented France at various youth international levels.

He debuted for the senior Benin national team in a friendly 1–0 loss with Mauritania on 25 March 2017.

== Career statistics ==
As of 4 June 2021

Appearances and goals by club, season and competition
| Club | Season | League | | | National cup | | League cup | | Total | |
| Club | Season | Division | Apps | Goals | Apps | Goals | Apps | Goals | Apps | Goals |
|---|---|---|---|---|---|---|---|---|---|---|
| Rennes | 2013–14 | Ligue 1 | 18 | 1 | 1 | 0 | 1 | 1 | 20 | 2 |
| Châteauroux (loan) | 2014–15 | Ligue 2 | 30 | 0 | 3 | 0 | 0 | 0 | 33 | 0 |
| Auxerre (loan) | 2015–16 | Ligue 2 | 32 | 0 | 0 | 0 | 1 | 0 | 33 | 0 |
| Gazélec | 2016–17 | Ligue 2 | 33 | 2 | 1 | 0 | 1 | 0 | 35 | 2 |
| Gazélec | 2017–18 | Ligue 2 | 2 | 0 | 0 | 0 | 0 | 0 | 2 | 0 |
| Gazélec | Total | | 35 | 2 | 1 | 0 | 1 | 0 | 37 | 2 |
| New York City | 2018 | MLS | 1 | 0 | 1 | 0 | – | | 2 | 0 |
| Levski Sofia | 2018–19 | Bulgarian First Professional League | 6 | 0 | – | | – | | 6 | 0 |
| Clermont | 2019–20 | Ligue 2 | 21 | 0 | 0 | 0 | 0 | 0 | 21 | 0 |
| Clermont | 2020–21 | Ligue 2 | 37 | 1 | 0 | 0 | 1 | 0 | 38 | 1 |
| Clermont | Total | | 58 | 1 | 0 | 0 | 1 | 0 | 59 | 1 |
| Career total | | | 180 | 4 | 6 | 0 | 4 | 1 | 190 | 5 |
