= Jodel Dossou =

Beninese footballer

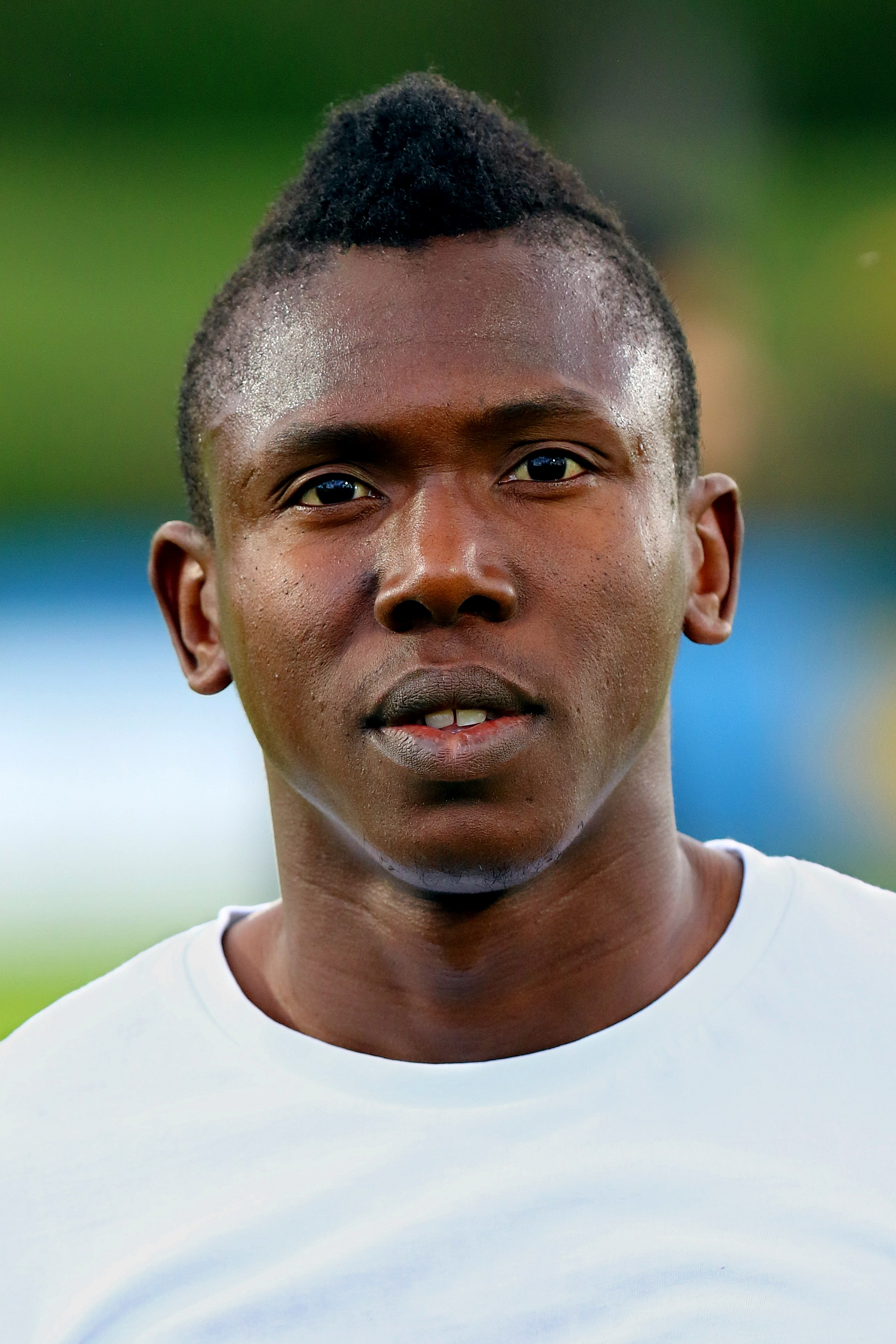
- Dossou with Austria Lustenau in 2018

Personal information
- Full name: Jodel Harold Oluwafemi Dossou
- Date of birth: 17 March 1992 (age 34)
- Place of birth: Dassa-Zoumé, Benin
- Height: 1.80 m (5 ft 11 in)
- Position: Midfielder

Team information
- Current team: Victoria Rosport
- Number: 20

Senior career*
Years	Team	Apps	(Gls)
2008–2011	CIFAS de Djeffa		
2011–2013	Tonnerre d'Abomey		
2013–2014	Club Africain	3	(1)
2014	Red Bull Salzburg	0	(0)
2014	→ FC Liefering	8	(2)
2015–2018	Austria Lustenau	89	(14)
2018–2019	Vaduz	35	(9)
2019–2020	TSV Hartberg	31	(7)
2020–2023	Clermont	81	(16)
2023–2024	Sochaux	16	(2)
2023–2024	Sochaux II	5	(2)
2024	Toulon	3	(0)
2025–	Victoria Rosport	12	(3)

International career^{‡}
2013–	Benin	76	(11)
- * Club domestic league appearances and goals as of 26 June 2025 ‡ National team caps and goals as of 5 January 2026

Jodel Harold Oluwafemi Dossou (born 17 March 1992) is a Beninese professional footballer who plays as a midfielder for Luxembourg National Division club Victoria Rosport and the Benin national team.

== Career ==
In August 2020, Dossou joined Ligue 2 club Clermont Foot from Austrian Bundesliga side TSV Hartberg.

In January 2023, Dossou signed for Sochaux on a contract until June 2025. He had his contract terminated by mutual consent in July 2024.

== Career statistics ==
As of matches played on 5 January 2026

Appearances and goals by national team and year
National team	Year	Apps	Goals
Benin	2013	3	0
Benin	2014	4	0
Benin	2015	3	0
Benin	2016	4	1
Benin	2017	5	0
Benin	2018	4	0
Benin	2019	12	2
Benin	2020	3	1
Benin	2021	7	1
Benin	2022	7	1
Benin	2023	8	2
Benin	2024	7	1
Benin	2025	8	0
Benin	2026	1	1
Total		76	11

Scores and results list Benin's goal tally first, score column indicates score after each Dossou goal.

List of international goals scored by Jodel Dossou
No.	Date	Venue	Opponent	Score	Result	Competition
1	27 March 2016	Stade de l'Amitié, Cotonou, Benin	South Sudan	3–0	4–1	2017 Africa Cup of Nations qualification
2	3 September 2017	Estadio de Malabo, Malabo, Equatorial Guinea	Equatorial Guinea	2–0	2–1	Friendly
3	6 September 2019	Stade Michel d'Ornano, Caen, France	Ivory Coast	1–1	2–1	Friendly
4	17 November 2019	Stade Charles de Gaulle, Porto-Novo, Benin	Sierra Leone	1–0	1–0	2021 Africa Cup of Nations qualification
5	14 November 2020	Stade Charles de Gaulle, Porto-Novo, Benin	Lesotho	1–0	1–0	2021 Africa Cup of Nations qualification
6	11 November 2021	Stade de l'Amitié, Cotonou, Benin	Madagascar	1–0	2–0	2022 FIFA World Cup qualification
7	24 March 2022	Mardan Sports Complex, Aksu, Turkey	Liberia	3–0	4–0	Friendly
8	29 March 2023	Kigali Pelé Stadium, Kigali, Rwanda	Rwanda	1–0	1–1/3–0	2023 Africa Cup of Nations qualification
9	9 September 2023	Estádio do Zimpeto, Maputo, Mozambique	Mozambique	2–2	2–3	2023 Africa Cup of Nations qualification
10	10 June 2024	Felix Houphouet Boigny Stadium, Abidjan, Ivory Coast	Nigeria	1–1	2–1	2026 FIFA World Cup qualification
11	5 January 2026	Adrar Stadium, Agadir, Morocco	Egypt	1–1	1–3 (a.e.t.)	2025 Africa Cup of Nations

== Honours ==
Red Bull Salzburg

- Austrian Bundesliga: 2013–14

FC Vaduz

- Liechtenstein Football Cup: 2018–19
