= Josué Albert =

French Guianan footballer (born 1992)

Personal information
- Date of birth: 21 January 1992 (age 34)
- Place of birth: Colombes, France
- Height: 1.85 m (6 ft 1 in)
- Position: Defender

Team information
- Current team: C'Chartres

Youth career
- 2008–2011: Saint-Étienne

Senior career*
Years	Team	Apps	(Gls)
2010–2011	Saint-Étienne B	4	(0)
2011–2012	Aberystwyth Town		
2012–2013	Guingamp B	17	(0)
2013–2014	Uzès Pont du Gard	7	(0)
2014–2018	Quevilly-Rouen	64	(3)
2017	Quevilly-Rouen B	17	(0)
2018–2022	Clermont	34	(0)
2019–2022	Clermont B	5	(0)
2023–2024	Wasquehal	15	(0)
2024–	C'Chartres	4	(0)

International career^{‡}
2016–	French Guiana	4	(0)
- * Club domestic league appearances and goals as of 21 September 2024 ‡ National team caps and goals as of 21 May 2022

Josué Albert (born 21 January 1992) is a professional footballer who plays as a defender for Championnat National 3 club C'Chartres. Born in metropolitan France, he plays for the French Guiana national team.

== Club career ==
Albert joined Quevilly-Rouen in 2014, and helped them rise from the Championnat National to the professional Ligue 2. He made his professional debut for Quevilly in a 1–0 Ligue 2 win over Sochaux on 12 January 2018.

== International career ==
Albert was born in France and is of French Guianan descent. He made his international debut for French Guiana in a 2–1 2017 Caribbean Cup qualification loss to Bermuda on 26 March 2016.
