= Jérôme Phojo =

French footballer (born 1993)

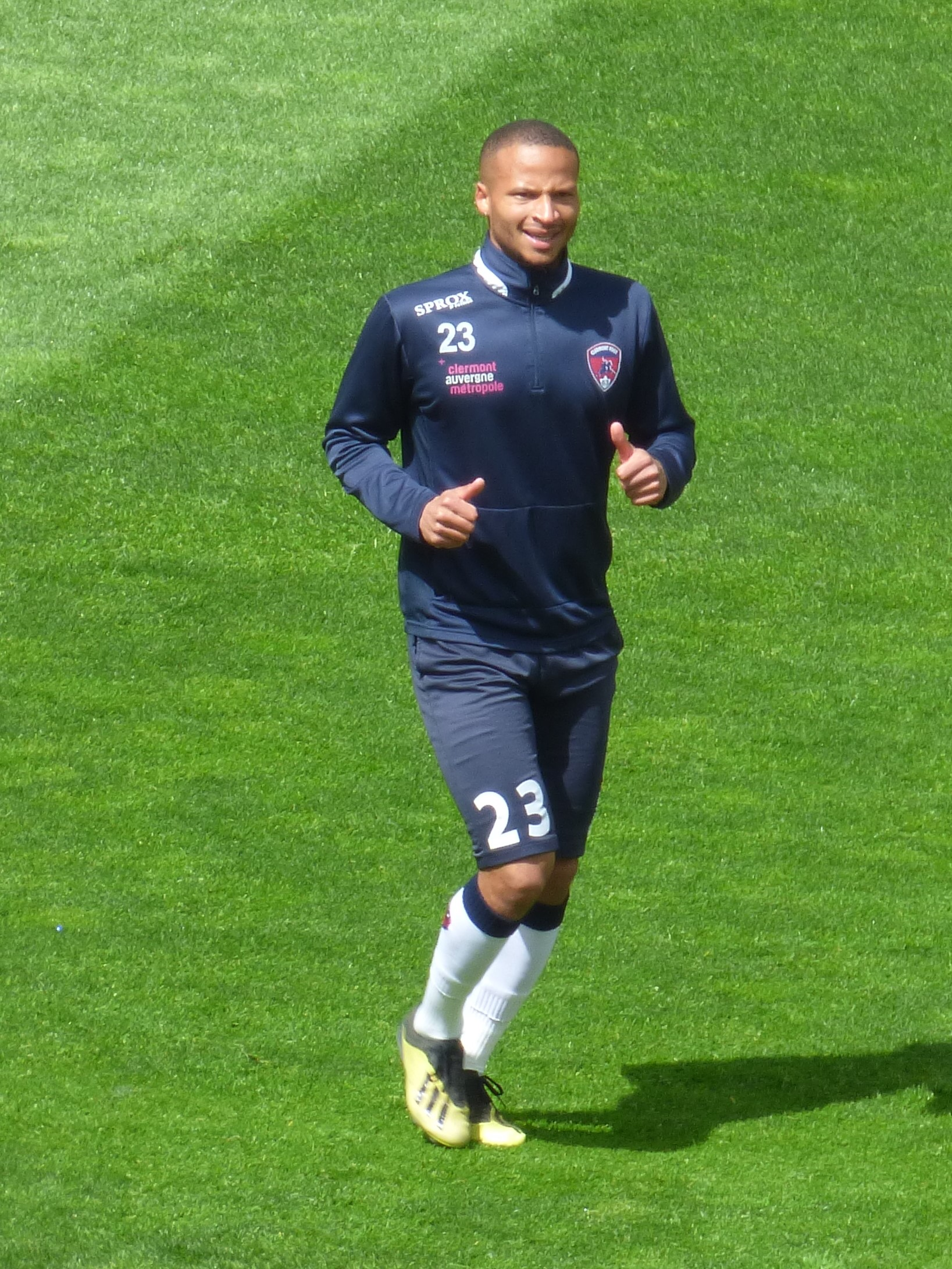

Personal information
- Date of birth: 15 April 1993 (age 33)
- Place of birth: Poissy, France
- Height: 1.78 m (5 ft 10 in)
- Position: Right-back

Youth career
- 1999–2006: Issou
- 2006–2007: Mantes
- 2007–2008: Sannois Saint-Gratien
- 2008–2011: Clairefontaine
- 2011–2012: Monaco

Senior career*
Years	Team	Apps	(Gls)
2012–2014	Monaco	1	(0)
2013–2014	→ CA Bastia (loan)	12	(0)
2014–2015	Arles-Avignon	27	(0)
2016–2017	Les Herbiers	32	(1)
2017–2022	Clermont	62	(0)

International career
2011–2012	France U19	9	(0)
2012	France U20	1	(0)
- * Club domestic league appearances and goals as of 21 May 2022

Jérôme Phojo (born 15 April 1993) is a French professional footballer who plays as a right-back. He is a former youth international for France, having earned caps at under-19 and under-20 level.

== Career ==
Born in Poissy, Phojo is a former graduate of the prestigious Clairefontaine academy and, upon leaving, signed with Monaco. With Monaco, he was a member of the Monaco under-19 team that won the 2010–11 edition of the Coupe Gambardella.

He made his professional debut on 18 May 2012 in a league match against Boulogne. Following the season, Phojo signed his first professional contract agreeing to a three-year deal.

== Career statistics ==
=== Club ===
As of 19 January 2014

Appearances and goals by club, season and competition
Club	Season	League			Cup (Note: Includes Coupe de France, Coupe de la Ligue, Trophée des champions)		Europe (Note: Includes UEFA Super Cup)		Total	
Club	Season	Division	Apps	Goals	Apps	Goals	Apps	Goals	Apps	Goals
Monaco	2011–12	Ligue 2	1	0	0	0	—		1	0
Monaco	2012–13	Ligue 2	0	0	2	0	—		2	0
Monaco	Total		1	0	2	0	0	0	3	0
CA Bastia (loan)	2013–14	Ligue 2	6	0	2	0	—		8	0
Career total			7	0	4	0	0	0	11	0
