= Akim Zedadka =

Algerian footballer (born 1995)

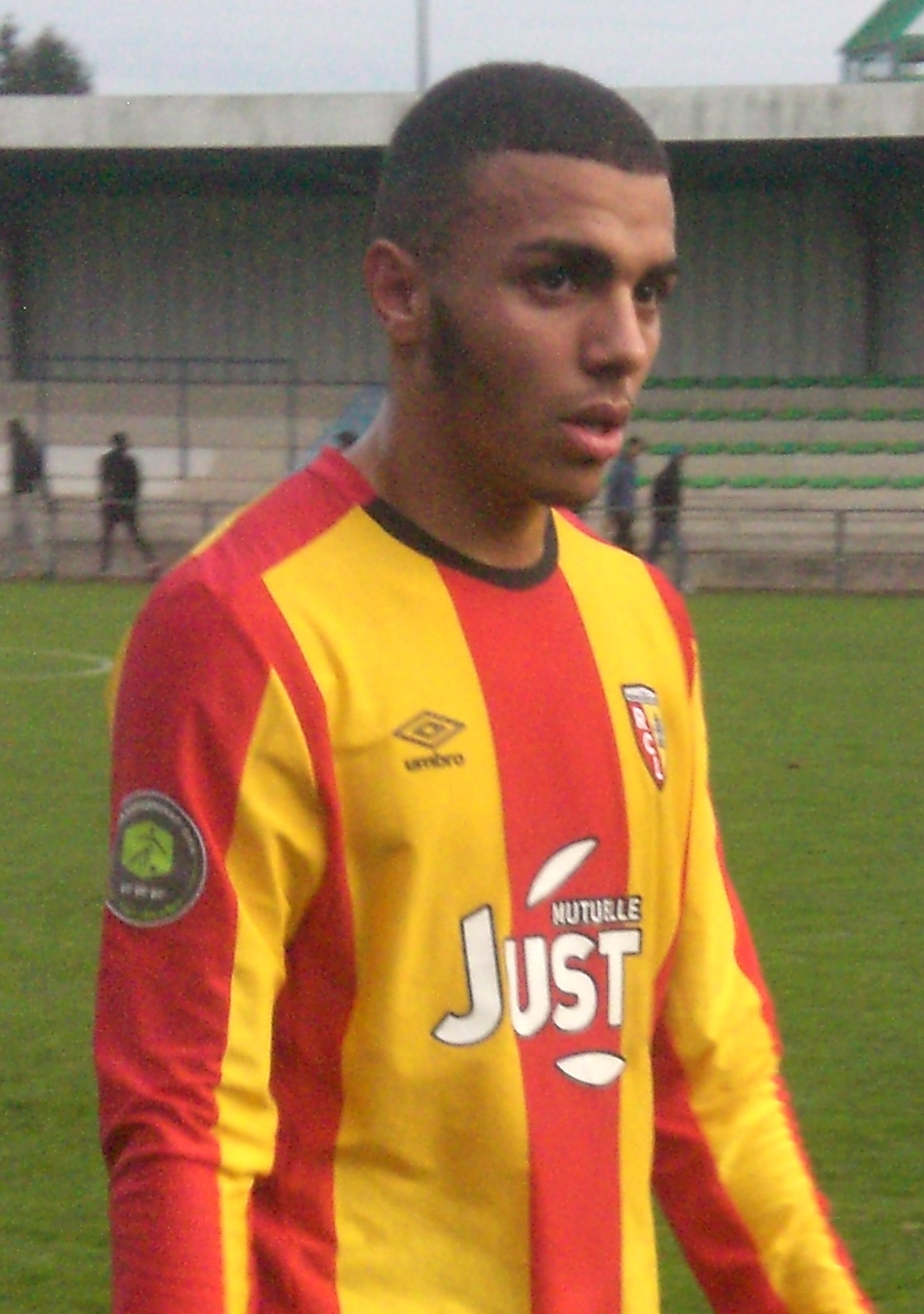
- Zedadka with Lens B in 2015

Personal information
- Date of birth: 30 May 1995 (age 31)
- Place of birth: Pertuis, France
- Height: 1.74 m (5 ft 9 in)
- Position: Right-back

Team information
- Current team: Sabah
- Number: 80

Senior career*
Years	Team	Apps	(Gls)
2014–2016	Istres	22	(4)
2016–2017	Lens B	34	(0)
2016–2017	Lens	4	(1)
2017–2018	AS Saint Rémoise	15	(3)
2018–2019	Marignane Gignac	32	(0)
2019	Clermont B	1	(0)
2019–2022	Clermont	95	(2)
2022–2025	Lille	8	(1)
2022–2023	→ Auxerre (loan)	20	(0)
2024	→ Zaragoza (loan)	11	(0)
2024	Lille B	2	(0)
2025	Piast Gliwice	12	(0)
2025–	Sabah	26	(1)

International career
2022	Algeria	1	(0)
- * Club domestic league appearances and goals as of 22 June 2026

Akim Zedadka (Arabic: حكيم زدادكة; born 30 May 1995) is a professional footballer who plays as a right-back for Azerbaijan Premier League club Sabah. Born in France, he plays for the Algeria national team.

== Club career ==
In 2017, Akim Zedadka joined French lower league side AS Saint Rémoise. He then joined Clermont in 2019, playing almost 100 games with the Auvergne team.

On 30 June 2022, he signed for Ligue 1 side Lille on a three-year contract. On 9 December 2022, he signed for AJ Auxerre on loan until the end of the 2022–23 season.

On 1 February 2024, Zedadka moved on loan to Real Zaragoza in Spain.

On 8 January 2025, Lille transferred Zedadka to Polish club Piast Gliwice.

On 21 June 2025, Zedadka signed a two-year contract with Azerbaijani club Sabah.

== International career ==
Born in France, Zedadka holds French and Algerian nationalities. He was called up to the Algeria national team in May 2022. Zedadka made his debut with Algeria in a 2–1 friendly win over Iran on 12 June 2022.

== Career statistics ==
=== International ===
As of match played 12 June 2022

Appearances and goals by national team and year
National team	Year	Apps	Goals
Algeria
Algeria	2022	1	0
Total		1	0

== Honours ==
Sabah

- Azerbaijan Premier League: 2025–26
- Azerbaijan Cup: 2025–26
