= Muamer Aljic =

Bosnian footballer (born 2000)

Personal information
- Date of birth: 19 June 2000 (age 26)
- Place of birth: Tuzla, Bosnia and Herzegovina
- Height: 1.85 m (6 ft 1 in)
- Position: Defender

Team information
- Current team: Thionville
- Number: 6

Youth career
- 2014–2016: Saint-Étienne
- 2016–2017: Lyon

Senior career*
Years	Team	Apps	(Gls)
2017–2020	Niort II	29	(1)
2019–2020	→ Andrézieux (loan)	7	(0)
2020–2021	Clermont II	3	(0)
2021	Clermont	0	(0)
2021–2023	Louhans-Cuiseaux	24	(3)
2023–2025	SAS Épinal	69	(5)
2025–	Thionville	32	(5)
- * Club domestic league appearances and goals as of 5 September 2026

Muamer Aljic (born 19 June 2000) is a Bosnian professional footballer who plays as a defender for French Ligue 3 club Thionville.

== Personal life ==
Aljic was born in Bosnia. He holds both Bosnian and French nationalities.

== Career ==
A youth product of Saint-Étienne and Lyon, Aljic began his senior career with the academy of Niort. After a loan with Andrézieux for the 2019–20 season, Aljic signed his first professional contract with Clermont on 19 June 2020. Aljic made his professional debut with Clermont in a 1–1 (4–2) Coupe de France penalty shootout loss to Grenoble Foot 38 on 20 January 2021.
