= Jordan Tell =

Guadeloupean footballer (born 1997)

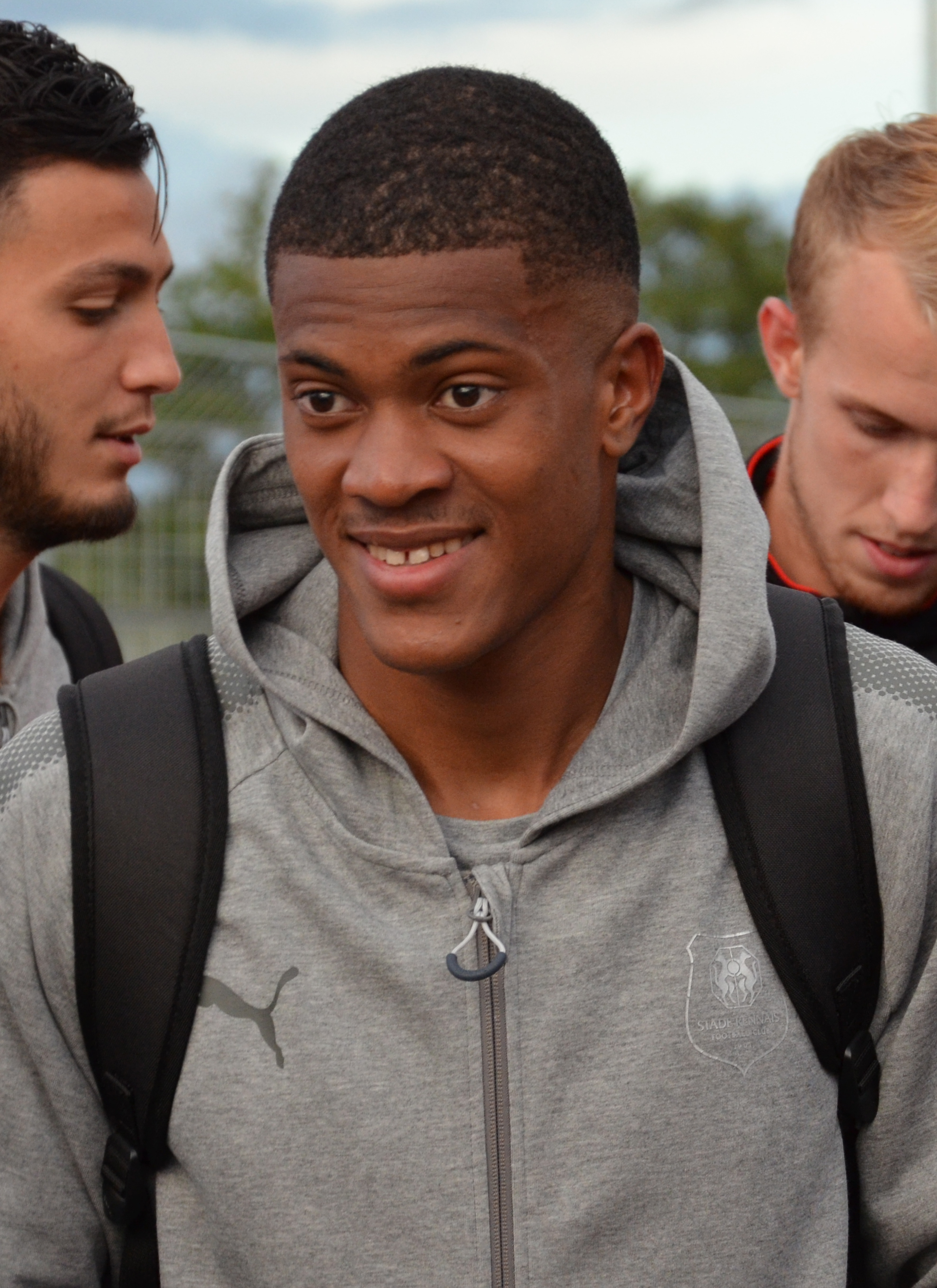
- Tell in 2017

Personal information
- Date of birth: 10 June 1997 (age 29)
- Place of birth: Les Abymes, Guadeloupe
- Height: 1.85 m (6 ft 1 in)
- Position: Forward

Team information
- Current team: FC Gifu
- Number: 17

Youth career
- 2003–2012: Solidarité Scolaire
- 2012–2017: Caen

Senior career*
Years	Team	Apps	(Gls)
2013–2017	Caen B	34	(8)
2017	Caen	5	(0)
2017–2020	Rennes	6	(1)
2018	→ Valenciennes (loan)	12	(1)
2018–2019	→ Orléans (loan)	20	(7)
2019–2020	→ Caen (loan)	5	(0)
2020–2022	Clermont	48	(3)
2022–2023	Grenoble	41	(7)
2023–2025	Laval	33	(1)
2025–2026	Concarneau	24	(4)
2026–	FC Gifu	2	(1)

International career^{‡}
2013	France U16	11	(7)
2013–2014	France U17	2	(0)
2015	France U18	3	(0)
2018	France U20	5	(4)
2023–	Guadeloupe	7	(1)
- * Club domestic league appearances and goals as of 17 August 2026 ‡ National team caps and goals as of 12 September 2024

Jordan Tell (born 10 June 1997) is a Guadeloupean professional footballer who plays as forward for Japanese side FC Gifu. A former youth international for France, he plays for the Guadeloupe team.

== Club career ==
In July 2020, Tell joined Clermont. On 31 January 2022, Tell signed a 1.5-year contract with Grenoble. On 1 September 2023, he transferred to Laval.

== International career ==
Tell was born in Guadeloupe, and opted to play for France as a youth international. In March 2023, he decided to play for the Guadeloupe team.
