= Vital Nsimba =

Footballer (born 1993)

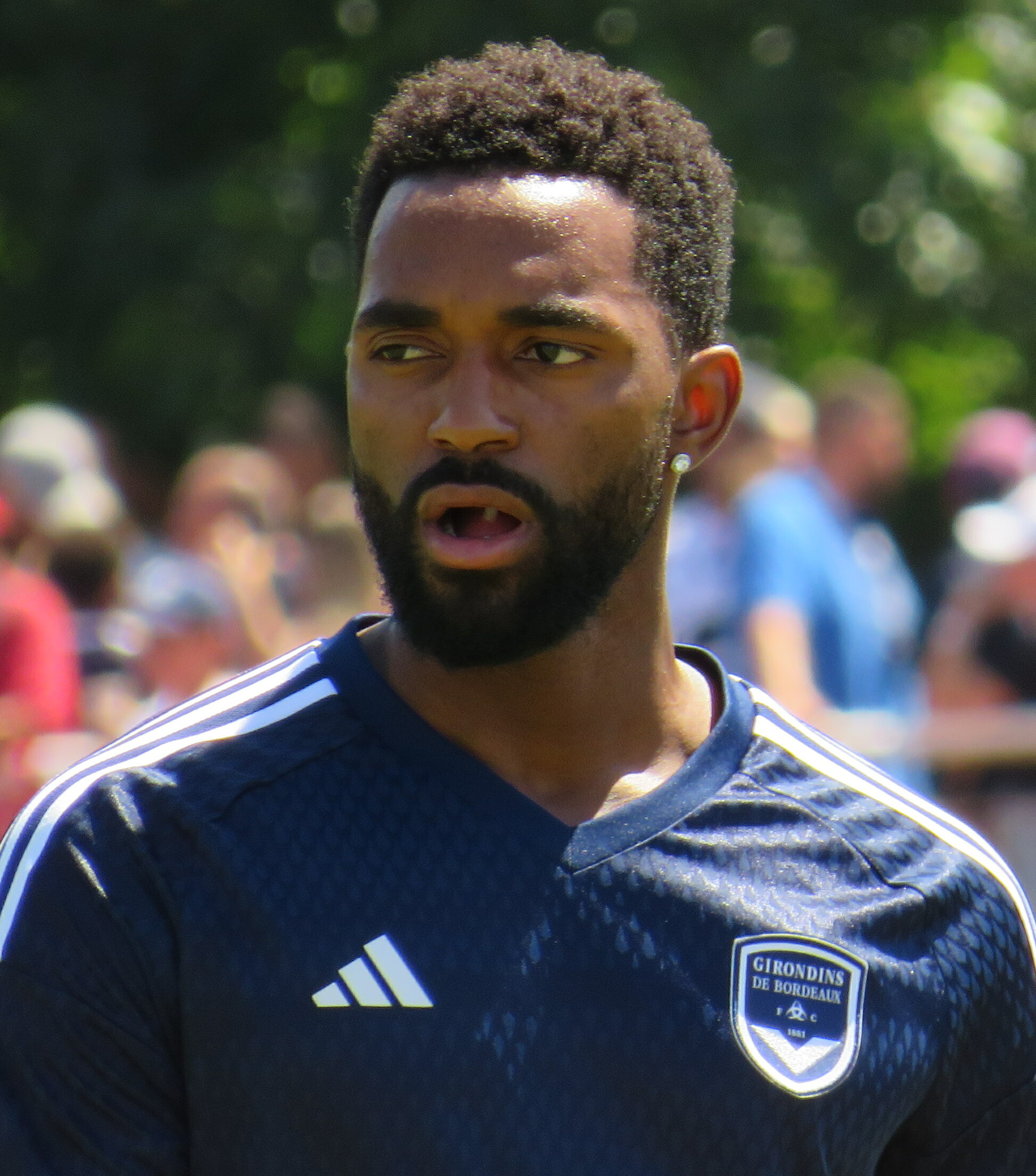
- Nsimba with Bordeaux in 2023

Personal information
- Full name: Vital Manuel Nsimba
- Date of birth: 8 July 1993 (age 33)
- Place of birth: Cacuaco, Angola
- Height: 1.69 m (5 ft 7 in)
- Position: Defender

Team information
- Current team: Clermont
- Number: 12

Senior career*
| Years | Team | Apps | (Gls) |
| 2011–2013 | Bordeaux B | 41 | (3) |
| 2013–2014 | Guingamp B | 23 | (3) |
| 2014–2015 | Luçon | 24 | (0) |
| 2015–2018 | Bourg-Péronnas | 92 | (1) |
| 2018 | Bourg-Péronnas B | 2 | (0) |
| 2018–2022 | Clermont | 120 | (0) |
| 2022–2024 | Bordeaux | 57 | (2) |
| 2024–2025 | Maccabi Haifa | 16 | (1) |
| 2025– | Clermont | 16 | (0) |

International career
| 2016 | DR Congo | 1 | (0) |
- * Club domestic league appearances and goals as of 12 May 2026

Vital Manuel Nsimba (born 8 July 1993) is a professional footballer who plays as a left defender for French Ligue 2 club Clermont. Born in Angola, he played one match for the DR Congo national team in 2016.
