= Jason Berthomier =

French footballer (born 1990)

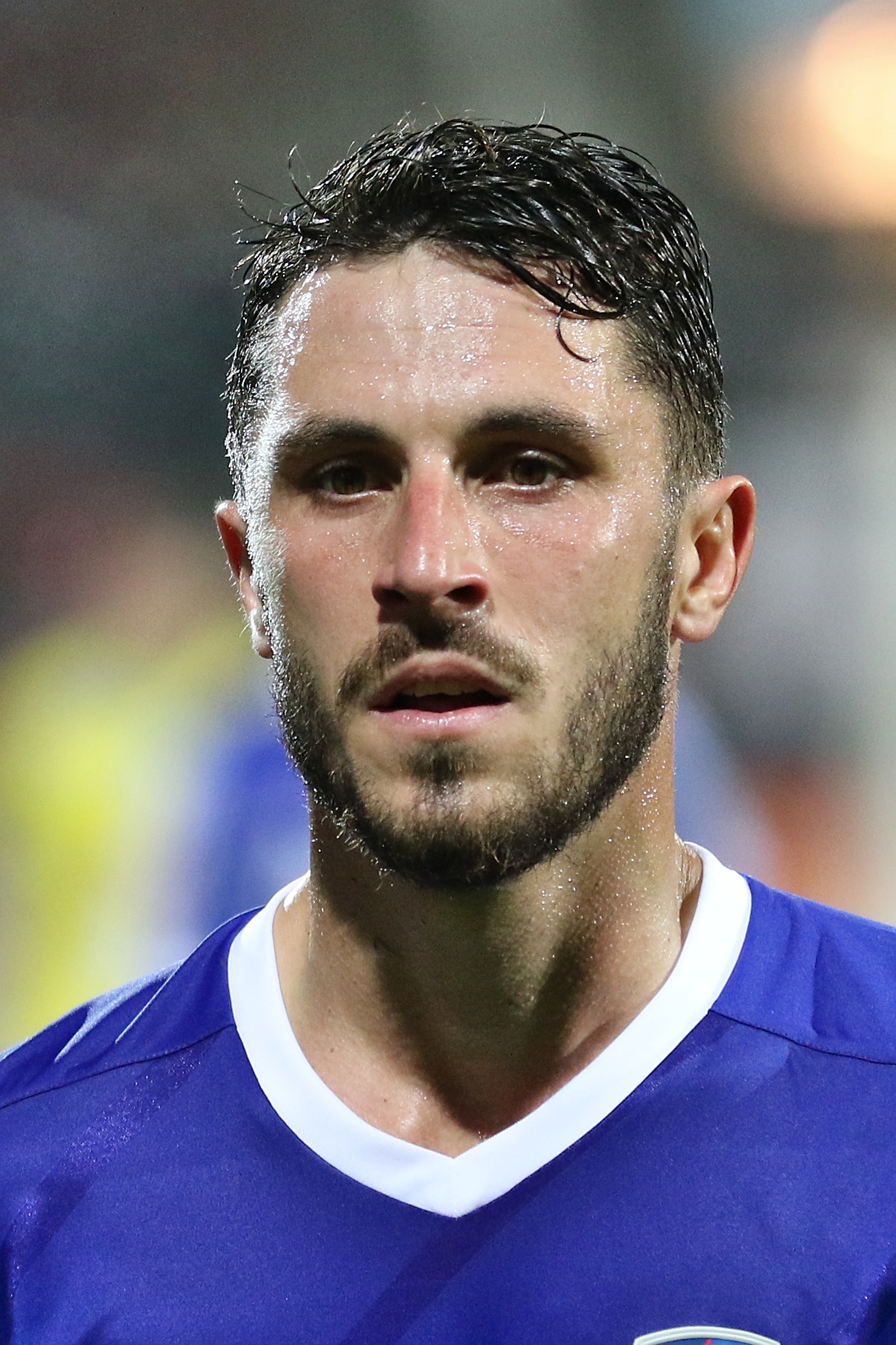
- Berthomier with Bourg-Péronnas in 2015

Personal information
- Date of birth: 6 January 1990 (age 36)
- Place of birth: Montluçon, France
- Height: 1.75 m (5 ft 9 in)
- Position: Midfielder

Senior career*
Years	Team	Apps	(Gls)
2008–2009	Montluçon	6	(0)
2009–2010	AS Domérat	13	(1)
2010–2014	Moulins	110	(31)
2014–2017	Bourg-Péronnas	56	(10)
2017–2018	Stade Brest	30	(6)
2018–2019	Troyes	11	(0)
2019–2022	Clermont	109	(13)
2022–2023	Valenciennes	23	(2)
2023–2024	Newcastle Jets	7	(0)
- * Club domestic league appearances and goals as of 29 April 2024

Jason Berthomier (born 6 January 1990) is a French professional footballer who plays as a midfielder.

== Career ==
Berthomier began his career at hometown club Montluçon in 2008 before dropping into regional football with AS Domerat during the 2009–10 season. He subsequently spent four seasons with Moulins of the Championnat de France amateur, where he scored 31 goals in 110 league matches, before joining Bourg-Péronnas in the summer of 2014. In his first season with the club he was a regular starter as the team won promotion to Ligue 2, the second highest division of French football, for the first time in their history.

In August 2023, Berthomier signed for A-League club Newcastle Jets.
