= Châtelet du Crédoz =

French fortress

- Interactive map of Châtelet du Crédoz
- Location: Country: France; Former provinces of the Duchy of Savoy: Faucigny; Region: Auvergne-Rhône-Alpes; Department: Haute-Savoie; Municipality: Cornier
- Coordinates: 46°06′13″N 6°18′05″E (Note: Coordinates found on Géoportail.)
- Type: Castle
- Beginning date: 13th century
- More information: Original owner: Sires de Faucigny; Current use: Ruined

The Châtelet du Crédoz, also known as the Châtelet de Crêt d’Ot, is a former 13th-century fortress located in the commune of Cornier in the French department of Haute-Savoie, within the Auvergne-Rhône-Alpes region. Between the 13th and 15th centuries, it functioned as the seat of a castellany.

== Toponymy ==
The toponym is recorded in historical documents in several forms, including Crêt-d’Ot, Crêt-d’Ost, Crêt-d’Oz, Credoz, Credu, and Credo; the variant Crédo (Castelleti de Credo) also appears. According to local historian Lucien Guy, the original spelling was likely Crêt-d’Ot or Crêt-d’Ost, a name referring to the gathering place of vassals before military campaigns in the Middle Ages, known as the ost.

In medieval terminology, the word châtelet designated a fortified site used for defense or surveillance, as opposed to a castle, which served as a center of authority and residence.

== Location ==
The Châtelet du Crédoz is situated in the commune of Cornier, in the French department of Haute-Savoie. It occupies an isolated rocky outcrop northwest of the village, at an elevation of 509 meters, in the Plaine des Rocailles between Reignier and La Roche-sur-Foron. Located on the left bank of the Arve, it oversaw the route linking La Roche to Bonne, which passed near the Château de Boringe (Reignier) and Nangy.

== History ==
The Châtelet du Crédoz is first mentioned in an arbitration ruling dated 10 May 1225 between Count William II of Geneva and Baron Aymon II of Faucigny. Some historians consider that it was established shortly before this date and that it initially depended on the lords of Faucigny. According to Guy Gavard, it belonged to the Counts of Geneva as an enclave within Faucigny territory, as suggested by the 1225 ruling. The fief nevertheless appears to have come under Faucigny control shortly thereafter.

In 1263, Agnès of Faucigny, who had inherited the site from her father, indicated that her husband, Count Peter II of Savoy, had fortified it at considerable expense and had built a circular keep around 1260. Béatrice of Faucigny, their daughter, pledged the fortress in 1269 while held captive by her aunt, and it was pledged again the following year to her uncle, Count Philip I. In May 1293, Béatrice transferred it to her cousin, Count Amadeus V of Savoy. The following month, the Grande Dauphine rendered homage to the Count of Savoy for the castle. Under the peace treaty concluded in August 1308 between the Count of Savoy and the Grande Dauphine Béatrice, the castles of Faucigny, Bonne, Monthoux, Bonneville, Châtelet du Crédoz, Alinge-le-Vieux, and Lullin, together with their jurisdictions, remained fiefs of the Count of Savoy.

At the beginning of the 14th century, the castle contained war machines such as ballistae, and projectiles were produced there for use against the walls of Geneva and the Château de Ville-la-Grand. Crédoz also served as the departure point for troops engaged in sieges of nearby castles, including Monthoux (Vétraz-Monthoux), Allinges (Château-Vieux and Château-Neuf), Montforchier (Lullin), and Beaufort.

The 1339 Vatican survey lists six noble households with fortified residences equipped with “towers and other defenses” under the jurisdiction of the Châtelet du Crédoz.

Following the annexation of Faucigny in 1355 and the acquisition of the County of Geneva in 1401, the Châtelet du Crédoz lost its strategic importance and, no longer maintained, gradually fell into ruin.

In 1435 and 1437, it was granted in fief to Amédée de Viry and Jean du Clos, who sold it in 1441 to Philip of Savoy, Count of Genevois.

In 1514, the castle passed to the Nemours branch, which held it until 1659, when it returned to the domain of the Dukes of Savoy.

In her will dated 6 October 1675, Marie, the last heir of the Genève-Lullin family, transferred all her rights and possessions—including the castles of Crédoz, La Roche, Monnetier, and Mornex—to Christine of France, Duchess of Savoy. These fiefs were subsequently granted and elevated to a marquisate by Duke Victor Amadeus II on 21 February 1682, in favor of President Thomas Granery (Act of 10 March 1682), Count of Mercenasque and General Superintendent of Finances of Savoy. The lordship of Crédoz was formally established as a marquisate in 1700. Charles-Emmanuel Graneri, his elder brother and Count of Mercenasco, also held the Marquisate of La Roche (La Roche-sur-Foron), while their uncle, Marc-Antoine Graneri, served as Abbot of Entremont. The last member of this Turinese family, Henriette Graneri (Enrichetta Graneri de La Roche), died in 1843. She was the wife of Count Joseph de Gerbaix de Sonnaz (1784–1863) and bequeathed the castle to her nephew, Charles-Albert Aimé de Gerbais de Sonnaz.

== Description ==
The Châtelet du Crédoz currently consists of a roughly triangular fortified enclosure occupying the entire upper section of the rocky outcrop. The site was protected by two defensive enclosures, one situated higher and the other lower.

A curtain wall, reinforced at its center by a small round tower, connects two square towers. The tower at the northeast corner, measuring 8 meters per side, adjoined a large hall, or aula, 21 meters in length. This tower may have served as the original keep prior to the construction of a circular keep on the northwest side, built by Peter of Savoy in the mid-13th century. The circular keep, which faced the likely direction of attack and included a barbican, has walls 2.80 meters thick and a diameter of 7.68 meters, with a preserved height of 14 meters. Access was originally through a door located 6 meters above ground level.

A moated enclosure, dating from the mid-13th century and supplied with water from a nearby pond, (Note: The pond is now dry.) surrounded the settlement that developed at the base of the castle.

== Castellany of the Châtelet du Crédoz ==
=== Organization ===
The Châtelet du Crédoz served as the center of a castellany, or mandement (mandamentum), in Faucigny, established from the 13th century, possibly at the end of the 12th century. By the end of the 12th century, Faucigny was reportedly organized into nine castellanies, (Note: List of the nine castellanies in order of precedence: Châtillon, Toisinges (Bonneville), Bonne, Sallanches, Faucigny, Le Châtelet du Crédoz, Samoëns, Montjoie, and Flumet.) with the Châtelet du Crédoz ranked sixth in precedence, according to a 1431 inventory of the titles of Faucigny cited by Canon Jean-Louis Grillet.

During the Delphinal period (1342–1343), Faucigny was organized into fifteen castellanies, including the Châtelet du Crédoz.

When Faucigny became part of the apanage of the Count of Genevois, also titled Baron of Faucigny and Beaufort, the castellany of the Châtelet du Crédoz was retained.

In the 14th century, the castellany included the villages of Arenthon, Boringe, Nangy, Pers, Reignier, Saint-Romain (now part of Reignier-Ésery), and Scientrier.

Villages, parishes, fortifications of the castellany of the Crédoz small castle
Commune	Name	Type
Arthaz-Pont-Notre-Dame	Les Châtelards	small castle
Cornier	Châtelet du Crédoz	castle
Cornier	Commanderie de Moussy	commandery
Nangy	Château de Pierre	castle
Pers-Jussy	Château de Cevins	castle
Pers-Jussy	Château d'Ornex	castle
Pers-Jussy	La Tour	other
Pers-Jussy	Le Châtelard	small castle
Reignier	Château de Magny	fortified house
Reignier	Château de Méran	fortified house
Reignier	Château de Polinge	castle
Reignier	Château de Pont-d'Arve	castle
Reignier	Château de Villy	castle
Reignier	Maison forte de Bellecombe	fortified house

In the early 14th century, the barony of Faucigny was reorganized into 17 castellanies.

=== Castellans ===
In the County of Savoy, the castellan was an officer appointed for a defined term and could be revoked or removed. The castellan managed the castellany or mandement, collected fiscal revenues, and oversaw the maintenance of the castle.

From 1536 to 1567, the northern part of the duchy was occupied by the Bernese. After 1567, castellans retained primarily judicial responsibilities, while military functions were assigned to officials titled captain, commander, or governor of the fortification.

Castellans of the Châtelet du Crédoz from the 14th to the 16th century
Savoyard administration
- 1307–1311 (also receiver): Girod David
- April 1312–March 1313: Pierre Allamandi
- 1319–1320: Raymond de Thoire
- 22 July 1355–10 April 1358: Pierre Viboud / Vibod
- 15 March 1358–10 August 1360: Pierre de Natage
- 10 August 1360–13 September 1362 (also receiver from 22 February 1361 to 13 September 1362): Barthelemy de Chignin
- 13 September 1362–February 1379 (also receiver from 16 April 1371 to 20 February 1372): Jean de Villette
- February 1379–22 October 1384: Jacques de Villette, son of the previous, Jean de Villette
- 22 October 1384–24 January 1388 (also receiver from 22 October 1384 to 22 April 1385): Girard de Dingy (Dingier)
- 24 January 1388–4 June 1389: Georges de Marlion
- 4 June 1389–26 May 1397 (also receiver from 27 May 1393 to 3 March 1394): Hugonet d’Arlod
- 26 May 1397–6 June 1410 (also receiver from 14 September 1403 to 1 May 1405): Jean d’Arculinge, prosecutor of Genevois and Chablais for Count Amadeus VIII of Savoy
  - 6 June 1410–2 January 1414: Jacques Vidonne, lieutenant
- 2 January 1414–24 June 1424 (also receiver from 24 June 1419 to 24 June 1420): Jacques Vidonne
- 24 June 1424–24 June 1429: Nicolet (II) de La Croix
- 24 June 1429–26 March 1435: Pierre de Menthon (also castellan of Bonneville 1419–1436, Rumilly-sous-Cornillon 1422–1424, La Roche 1422–1436)
- 28 September 1436–26 March 1438: Jean Alamandi
- 18 October 1440–26 March 1441: Antoine Berne, commissioner by Prince Philippe of Savoy, Count of Geneva, Baron of Faucigny and Beaufort, Lord of Ugine and Giordans
- 26 March 1441–28 September 1444: Guillaume de Lornay (Delornay)
- 26 September 1444–26 March 1445: Albert des Clefs
- 26 March 1445–10 October 1445: Albert des Allinges
- 10 October 1445–26 March 1452: Philibert de Lornay (Delornay) and his nephews Albert and Aymon de Lornay (Delornay), sons of Guillaume de Lornay (Delornay)
- 18 August 1466–7 December 1478 (also receiver from 26 March 1474 to 26 March 1475): Guillaume de Cordon, Lord of Pluvy
- 7 December 1478–26 March 1492 (also receiver from 26 March 1484 to 26 March 1485): Jacques de Lornay (Delornay)
- 26 March 1492–26 March 1493: Boniface de La Grange
- 26 March 1493–26 March 1496 (also receiver from 26 March 1494 to 26 March 1495): Jean Daniel
- 26 March 1496–26 March 1499: Aleram de Biandra, Lord of Saint-George
- 26 March 1499–27 March 1529 (also receiver for the periods 26 March 1503–26 March 1504, 27 March 1511–27 March 1512, 27 March 1521–27 March 1522): Philippe de Valpergue

Administration of the apanage of Genevois (1538–1659)

- Before 1538: Noble Jacques de Genville
- 1530–1534: Noble George de Genève, of Annemasse
- 1535–1537: Noble Pierre de Chambouz
- 1539–1541: Noble Aymon Callige
- 1543–1544: Nobles Jean Pavon and Étienne Mestral
- 1544–1547: Noble Aymon Callige
- 1547–1550: Noble Jacques Chesney
- 1550–1553: Noble George de Genève, of Annemasse
- 1553–1555: Noble Pierre Constantin
- 1555–1559: Noble Étienne Constantin
- 1565: Master Pierre Pernin, appointed by provision
- 1565–1568: Noble Humbert Jay
- 1565: Noble François de Lucinge, castellan for judicial matters
- 1568–1571: Noble Aymé de Cuppelin (de Cupelin)
- 1571–1577: Master Jean Lesvye
- 1577–1580: Master Jean Paccot
- 1580–1586: Noble Bapthozard Jalliet
- 1586–1592: Master Jean Dufoug
- 1592–1598: Master Claude Lombard
- 1598–1601: Master Antoine Lombard
- 1601–1604: Master Jacques Mieucet
- 1604–1610: Master Claude Lombard
- 1610–1616: Master or Noble Charles-Henri Dumonel
- 1616–1622: Master Jean Chardon, substitutes the office with Master Pierre Déage
- 1622–1634: Master Henri Déage
- 1634–1640: Master Jean Roguet
- 1640–1646: Master François Verdel
- 1646–1652: Honorable Abraham Milliet
- 1652–1658: Masters Pierre Déage and François Burnod
- 1654–1658: Master Henri Babut
- 1658–1659: Master Claude-Gaspard Déage

== See also ==
- Medieval fortification
- Castle
- Fortification

== Bibliography ==
- Baud, Henri; Mariotte, Jean-Yves; Guerrier, Alain (1980). Histoire des communes savoyardes : Le Faucigny [History of Savoyard municipalities: Le Faucigny] (in French). Roanne: Éditions Horvath. ISBN 2-7171-0159-4.
- Blondel, Louis (1978). Châteaux de l'ancien diocèse de Genève [Castles of the former diocese of Geneva] (in French). Vol. 7. Société d'histoire et d'archéologie de Genève. pp. 289–298.
- Carrier, Nicolas; de La Corbière, Matthieu (2005). Entre Genève et Mont-Blanc au XIVe siècle : enquête et contre-enquête dans le Faucigny delphinal de 1339 [Between Geneva and Mont Blanc in the 14th century: investigation and counter-investigation in the Dauphin's Faucigny in 1339] (in French). Librairie Droz. ISBN 978-2-88442-019-8.
- Chapier, Georges (2005). Châteaux Savoyards : Faucigny, Chablais, Tarentaise, Maurienne, Savoie propre, Genevois [Savoyard castles: Faucigny, Chablais, Tarentaise, Maurienne, Savoie propre, Genevois]. L'amateur Averti (in French). La Rochelle: Éditions La Découvrance. ISBN 978-2-84265-326-2.
- Guy, Lucien (1929). "Les anciens châteaux du Faucigny" [The ancient castles of Faucigny]. Mémoires & documents (in French). 47.
- Salch, Charles-Laurent (1987). Dictionnaire des châteaux et des fortifications du Moyen Âge en France [Dictionary of Medieval Castles and Fortifications in France] (in French). Strasbourg: Éditions Publitotal. ISBN 2-86535-070-3. OCLC 1078727877.
- Lullin, Paul; Le Fort, Charles (1866). Régeste genevois : Répertoire chronologique et analytique des documents imprimés relatifs à l'histoire de la ville et du diocèse de Genève avant l'année 1312 [Régeste genevois: Chronological and analytical directory of printed documents relating to the history of the city and diocese of Geneva prior to 1312] (in French). Société d'histoire et d'archéologie de Genève.
- Payraud, Nicolas (2009). "Châteaux, espace et société en Dauphiné et en Savoie du milieu du XIIIe siècle à la fin du XVe siècle" [Castles, space, and society in Dauphiné and Savoie from the mid-13th century to the end of the 15th century] (PDF). HAL - Archives Ouvertes (in French).
- Regat, Christian; Aubert, François (1999). Châteaux de Haute-Savoie : Chablais, Faucigny, Genevois [Castles of Haute-Savoie: Chablais, Faucigny, Genevois] (in French). Éditions Cabédita. pp. 57–58. ISBN 978-2-88295-117-5.
