= Lullin =

- Commune
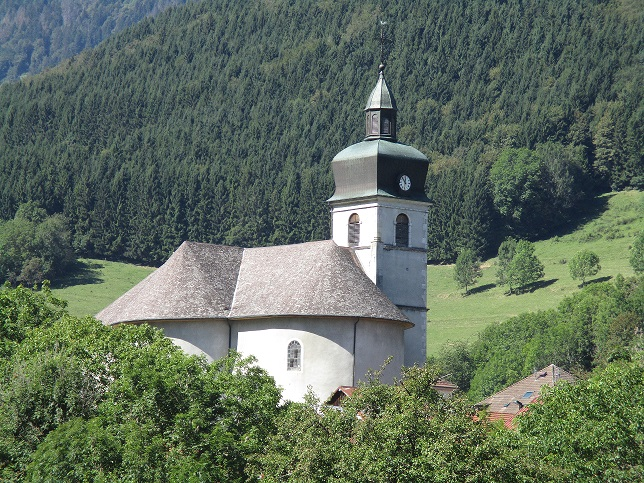
- Saint-Jean-Baptiste church

- Coat of arms
- Location of Lullin
- Location within France Location within Auvergne-Rhône-Alpes
- Coordinates: 46°17′00″N 6°32′00″E
- Country: France
- Region: Auvergne-Rhône-Alpes
- Department: Haute-Savoie
- Arrondissement: Thonon-les-Bains
- Canton: Thonon-les-Bains
- Intercommunality: Haut-Chablais

Government
  - Mayor (2020–2026): Alain Degenève
- Area^{1}: 13.25 km^{2} (5.12 sq mi)
- Highest elevation: 1,545 m (5,069 ft)
- Lowest elevation: 860 m (2,820 ft)
- Population (2023): 809
  - Density: 61.1/km^{2} (158/sq mi)
- Demonym: Lullinois / Lullinoises
- Time zone: UTC+01:00 (CET)
  - Summer (DST): UTC+02:00 (CEST)
- INSEE/Postal code: 74155 /74470
- ^{1} French Land Register data, which excludes lakes, ponds, glaciers > 1 km^{2} (0.386 sq mi or 247 acres) and river estuaries.

Lullin (French pronunciation: [lylɛ̃]; Arpitan: Lelyin) is a commune in the Haute-Savoie department in the Auvergne-Rhône-Alpes region in south-eastern France. It borders the communes of Vailly, Orcier, Habère-Poche and Bellevaux. The river Follaz goes through the town before flowing into the river Brevon, which in turn flows into the river Dranse, which eventually flows into Lake Geneva (French: lac Léman). The commune of Lullin includes several hamlets such as Pimberty, La Siaux, la Touvière, La Grange des Bois, Le Feu, Très-le-Mont, Chez Dagain, Vauverdanne, Monterrebout, Les Courbes, Les Granges, Recueillères. Its highest point is Mont Forchat (1545m).

== See also ==
- Communes of the Haute-Savoie department
