= Armoy (disambiguation) =

Armoy may refer to the following places:

- Armoy, County Antrim, Northern Ireland
  - Armoy railway station
- Armoy, Haute-Savoie, France
- Fermoy (barony), County Cork, Ireland; formerly also called Armoy
