= Château de Bonneville (Haute-Savoie) =

Fortified castle in France

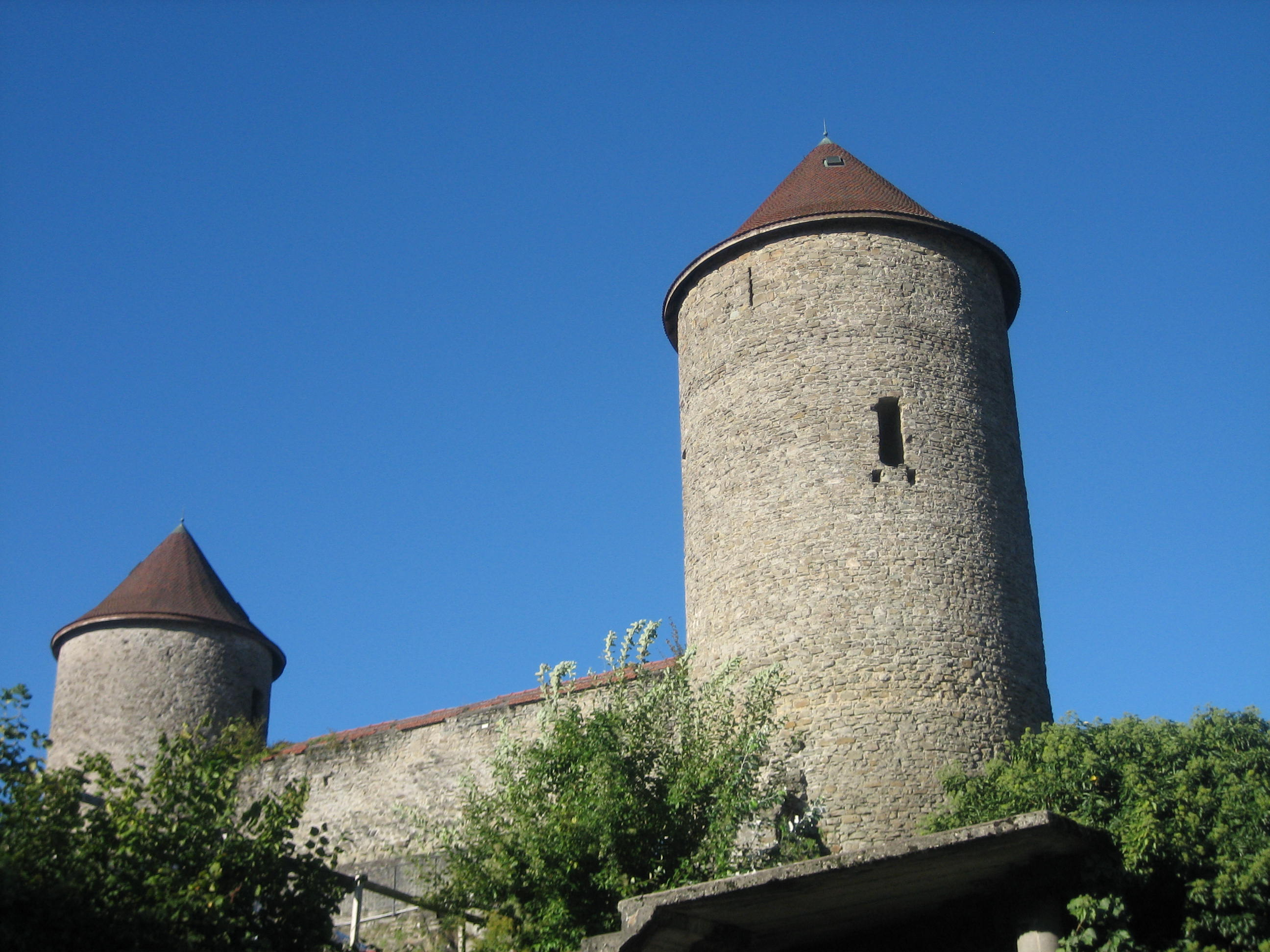
- Interactive map of Château de Bonneville
- Location: Country: France; Former provinces of the Duchy of Savoy: Faucigny; Region: Auvergne-Rhône-Alpes; Department: Haute-Savoie; Municipality: Bonneville
- Coordinates: 46°04′44″N 6°24′30″E
- Type: Castle
- Beginning date: 13th century
- Potection: Listed as a historic monument (1987)

Original owner: Beatrice of Faucigny Original purpose: Count's residence Current owner: Municipality of Bonneville Current purpose: Open to the public

The Château de Bonneville, also known as the Castle of the Lords of Faucigny or of Béatrix de Faucigny, is a former fortified castle dating from the 13th century and restored in the 16th century. Its remains are located in the commune of Bonneville in the Haute-Savoie department, within the Auvergne-Rhône-Alpes region. In the 13th century, it served as the seat of a châtellenie.

The ruins of the former comital castle were listed as a historical monument by a decree issued on 3 November 1987.

== Location ==
The Château de Bonneville is located in the commune of Bonneville in the Haute-Savoie department. It stands on a rocky mound overlooking the town to the north of the Place du Parquet, at an elevation of approximately 450 metres. Positioned on the right bank of the Arve, it commands the confluence of the Arve and the Borne.

== Toponymy ==
The castle is located in the Bourg du Château (Burgum Castri) and is referred to as Castrum Arvense. The settlement received the name Bona villa (“the Good Town”) from Béatrice de Faucigny, corresponding to present-day Bonneville. The earliest known document mentioning the toponym dates from 1289.

The municipal website refers to the castle as Sires de Faucigny or Béatrix de Faucigny, in reference to Béatrix (or Béatrice), lady of Faucigny. The plaque presenting the restoration work uses the form “Château des Sires du Faucigny,” which is also employed in the designation of the adjacent eco-district. This naming convention is likewise used by local institutions, including the website of the Communauté de communes Faucigny-Glières and the regional tourism body Savoie Mont Blanc.

== History ==
On the hill of Pressy, behind the high school, the Lords of Anières built a Romanesque tower in the 11th century to oversee the crossing of the Arve. This structure, now disappeared, marked the location of the former castle of Toisinge(s) or Tucinge(s).

In 1262, slightly farther west, the future Count Peter of Savoy, then married to Agnes of Faucigny, constructed a wooden fort on a mound known as the chaffal. (Note: “Chaffal”: a medieval Savoyard term designating a wooden defensive structure.) The village originally bore the name Toisinge(s) or Tucinge(s), a form that appears in numerous documents prior to 1283.

This structure was replaced around 1290 by the current castle, attributed to his daughter Béatrice of Faucigny, known as the Grande Dauphine. (Note: In 1283, Béatrice de Faucigny gave the newly founded town the name Bonneville.) The town is first mentioned under its new name in an act dated 11 March 1289, in which the dauphin concluded an agreement with the lord of Beaufort.

Widowed from the dauphin Guigues VII of Viennois, Béatrice of Faucigny—who administered the Dauphiné and the Faucigny, whose territories formed a Dauphinois enclave between the County of Geneva and the States of Savoy—granted the Faucigny as an inheritance to her grandson Hugues de La Tour du Pin, son of Humbert de La Tour du Pin, at the castle on 2 January 1304. In the peace treaty concluded in August 1308 between the Count of Savoy and Béatrice, the castles of Faucigny, Bonne, Monthoux, Bonneville, Châtelet-de-Credo, Alinge-le-Vieux, and Lullin, with their respective mandates and jurisdictions, were included. The castle was also the site of the 1309 marriage contract between Hugues de La Tour du Pin and Marie of Savoy, daughter of Count Amadeus V.

In 1355, when the Faucigny returned to Savoyard control under the Treaty of Paris, Amadeus VI designated the site as the centre of a châtellenie, making it the administrative and judicial seat of the region. The juge-mage resided there, and the town council held its sessions at the castle. That same year, Amadeus VI stayed at the castle and granted it to his wife, Bonne of Bourbon. The structure was damaged by a fire in 1392 or 1393 and was restored in 1583.

In 1589, the castle resisted the conflict opposing the Duke of Savoy, Charles Emmanuel, to Geneva and the King of France.

In the 16th and 17th centuries, the Faucigny was granted as an appanage to the Genevois-Nemours. They were represented in Bonneville by a châtelain residing at the castle. Prisons were established within the castle, and in the 18th century under the House of Savoy, the residential quarters were demolished. The castle continued to function as a prison until 1934 and was subsequently acquired by the commune of Bonneville.

== Description ==
The Château de Bonneville, with its regular layout, is an example of a “Savoyard square” castle. It consists of a quadrangular enclosure, originally surrounded by a ditch, measuring 18 metres wide and 85 metres long, with round towers at each corner, of which two on the eastern side remain. The eastern towers, known as the “Black Tower” and the “White Tower,” are 21 metres and 15 metres high, respectively, and were built by Béatrice de Faucigny, daughter of Peter II of Savoy. They are connected by an 18-metre curtain wall enclosing the seigneurial courtyard. Access to the castle was through a fortified gate framed by two towers and preceded by a drawbridge.

The western section of the castle was significantly altered during its use as a prison, with only a walled-up window in the southern curtain wall remaining. (Note: Its tracery can be compared to that of the priory church of Contamine-sur-Arve, built in 1295 by the same Béatrice de Faucigny.) At the northwestern corner, the highest point of the rock is occupied by a cylindrical keep, 9.75 metres in diameter and 14.50 metres high. This isolated circular tower is believed to have been constructed in the second half of the 13th century.

The castle contains a Gothic chapel dedicated to Saint Catherine.

Two archaeological excavations were conducted in 2019 by the Archaeology and Built Heritage Unit of the Haute-Savoie Departmental Council.

The towers, curtain wall, and central courtyard are accessible to visitors during the summer season.

== Châtellenie of Bonneville ==
=== Organisation ===
The Château de Toisinges (Bonneville) served as the center of a châtellenie, or mandement, within the Faucigny, established from the 13th century. The Faucigny is believed to have been organised into nine châtellenies (Note: List of the nine châtellenies in the order of precedence: Châtillon, Toisinges (Bonneville), Bonne, Faucigny, Sallanches, Le Châtelet du Crédoz, Samoëns, Montjoie, and Flumet.) by the end of the 12th century, with Toisinges (Bonneville) holding second place in precedence, according to the 1431 inventory of the titles of the Faucigny, cited by Canon Jean-Louis Grillet.

During the Dauphiné period (1342–1343), the Faucigny was organised into fifteen châtellenies, including Bonneville. In the first half of the 14th century, the barony of Faucigny was again reorganised around seventeen châtellenies.

Villages, parishes, fortifications of the châtellenie of Bonneville
Commune	Name	Type
Ayse	Château des Tours	castle
Ayse	Maison forte de la Motte	fortified house
Bonneville	Château de Bonneville	castle
Bonneville	Château de Pressy	castle
Bonneville	Château des Roches	castle
Bonneville	Le Château	castle
Bonneville	Château de Cormand	fortified house
Brizon	Maison forte de Villy	fortified house
Marignier	Châtelard	small castle
Mont-Saxonnex	Château Blanc	other
Mont-Saxonnex	Le Châtelet	small castle
Mont-Saxonnex	Les Tours	other
Vougy	La Tour de l'Île	other

In the early 14th century, the barony of Faucigny was reorganized into seventeen châtellenies.

=== Châtelains ===
In the barony of Faucigny, and later in the County of Savoy, the châtelain was an officer appointed for a fixed term and subject to removal. The châtelain managed the châtellenie or mandement, oversaw the collection of fiscal revenues, and supervised the maintenance of the castle. He was sometimes assisted by a financial receiver who prepared the annual report.

At the 32nd Congress of Learned Societies of Savoy in 1988, Bernard Ducretet discussed the châtellenie of Beaufort, drawing on Étienne Dullin's 1911 doctoral thesis, Les châtelains dans les domaines de la Maison de Savoie en deçà des Alpes. He noted that, until the second half of the 16th century, châtelains served as intermediaries between the local populations (Note: The “communier or comparsoniers, consorts or jomarons” were a grouping or association of several peasant families, either within the framework of a parish or through the shared possession or exploitation of undivided property.) of their châtellenie and the prince's Curia, reporting on administration and conveying the community's wishes and grievances.

Châtelains of Bonneville from the 13th to the 17th century
Administration under the Faucigny, then the Dauphiné
- 1349: Aymaron Allemand, head of the Beauvoir branch, originally from the Viennois.

Savoyard administration

- 16 July 1355 – 10 March 1356: Jacques de La Balme
- 10 March 1356 – 24 January 1359: Rolet de Serraval
- February 1359 – 17 May 1360: Perrod de Saint-Avre
- 17 May 1360 – 13 February 1361: Henry de Saint-Avre; Girard de Coponey of Geneva, vice-châtelain
- 2 June 1361 – 2 March 1367 (receiver for the period 18 January 1363 to 10 January 1364): Humbert de Lucinge
- 2 March 1367 – 2 February 1370: Étienne de Lucinge, son of Humbert de Lucinge
- 10 September 1370 – 27 March 1371: Jean de Châtillon
- 27 March 1371 – 12 June 1377 (receiver for the period 24 January 1372 to February 1374): Pierre of Hauteville, co-lord
- 12 June 1377 – 4 May 1382: Nicod of Hauteville, son of Pierre of Hauteville
- 1 July 1383 – 20 January 1386 (receiver for the period 1 July 1383 to 16 March 1385): Jean de Conflans, future chancellor of Savoy in 1391
- 20 January 1386 – 10 March 1391: Guionet de Mecoraz
- 10 March 1391 – 21 August 1392: Jean, Pierre, and Hugonin de Mecoraz, sons of Guionet de Mecoraz
- 21 August 1392 – 19 May 1400 (receiver for the period 27 May 1393 to 1 March 1394): Rodolphe de La Croix
- 23 June 1401 – 16 September 1403: Jean de Clermont, lord of Saint-Pierre-de-Soucy (Combe de Savoie)
- 21 November 1403 – 9 February 1410 (receiver for the period 1 December 1406 to 9 February 1410): Mermet de Villier
- 12 April 1415 – ... : Hugonin de Lucinge (the same as the following?)
- 24 June 1418 – 24 June 1419: Hugues de Lucinge, bailiff of Faucigny, also châtelain of Rumilly-sous-Cornillon (1411–1417) and of Châtillon-sur-Cluses (1414–1419)
- 24 June 1419 – 26 March 1436 (receiver for the period 15 May 1431 to 26 March 1432): Pierre de Menthon
- 26 March 1436 – 15 September 1440 (receiver for the period 26 March 1439 to 26 March 1440): Pierre de Beaufort
- 15 September 1440 – 11 November 1448 (receiver for the period 26 March 1448 to 11 November 1448; treasurer for the period 26 March 1445 to 26 March 1446): Jean Vieux
- 11 November 1448 – 26 March 1451: François de Langin, lord of Veigier (Veigy)
- 26 March 1451 – 26 March 1454: Thomas Jourdain
- 11 November 1454 – 24 December 1455: Jean Champion, lord of La Bastie
- 1466 – 1480: Humbert Gruet

Administration of the Genevois apanage (1514–1659)

- 1530–1533: Noble Claude de Riddes
- 1530–1540: Noble Aymon Puthod
- 1540–1541: Nobles Robert Quinerit and Jacquemin Puthod
- 1541–1545: Noble Jean de Cholex
- 1544–1547: Noble Claude de Riddes
- 1547–1550: Noble Jean-Jacques de Passier
- 1550–1553: Noble Aymé de Bellegarde
- 1553–1556: Master Claude de La Feugière
- 1556–1559: Master Aymé Rochette
- 1559–1565: Master or Noble Pierre Rochette
- 1568–1569: Noble Pierre-Louis de L’Alée or Lalée
- 1569–1570: Nobles Pierre-Louis de L’Alée or Lalée and Gaspard de Lucinge
- 1570–1571: Noble Michel de Lucinge and Master Claude-Roland Brunier
- 1577–1580: Master Aymé Fichet
- 1580–1586: Noble Pierre-Louis de L’Alée or Lalée
- 1586–1592: Noble Pierre-Louis de L’Alée or Lalée
- 1592–1598: Noble Jean Paquellet de Moyron
- 1598–1604: Master Claude Paris
- 1604–1610: Master Martin Paris
- 1610–1616: Master Claude Lombard
- 1622–1628: Master Martin Paris
- 1628–1634: Master Martin Paris
- 1634–1640: Master Aymé Curtet
- 1640–1646: Master Étienne Montfort
- 1646–1652: Masters Étienne Montfort and Gabriel Desaix, co-farmers
- 1652–1658: Masters Pierre Calliet and Pierre Caulix
- 1658–1659: Master François Mermillod

== See also ==
- House of Savoy
- House of Faucigny
- Medieval fortification
- Castle
- Fortification

== Bibliography ==
- Baud, Henri; Mariotte, Jean-Yves; Guerrier, Alain (1980). Histoire des communes savoyardes : Le Faucigny [History of Savoyard municipalities: Le Faucigny] (in French). Roanne: Éditions Horvath. ISBN 2-7171-0159-4.
- Carrier, Nicolas; de La Corbière, Matthieu (2005). Entre Genève et Mont-Blanc au XIVe siècle : enquête et contre-enquête dans le Faucigny delphinal de 1339 [Between Geneva and Mont Blanc in the 14th century: investigation and counter-investigation in the Dauphin's Faucigny in 1339] (in French). Librairie Droz. ISBN 978-2-88442-019-8.
- Chapier, Georges (2005). Châteaux Savoyards : Faucigny, Chablais, Tarentaise, Maurienne, Savoie propre, Genevois [Savoyard castles: Faucigny, Chablais, Tarentaise, Maurienne, Savoie propre, Genevois]. L'amateur Averti (in French). Éditions La Découvrance. pp. 22–25. ISBN 978-2-8426-5326-2.
- Guy, Lucien (1929). "Les anciens châteaux du Faucigny" [The ancient castles of Faucigny]. Mémoires & documents (in French). 47: 152–154.
- Payraud, Nicolas (2009). Châteaux, espace et société en Dauphiné et en Savoie du milieu du XIIIe siècle à la fin du XVe siècle [Castles, space, and society in Dauphiné and Savoie from the mid-13th century to the end of the 15th century] (PDF) (Thesis) (in French). université Lumière-Lyon-II.
- Regat, Christian; Aubert, François (1999). Châteaux de Haute-Savoie : Chablais, Faucigny, Genevois [Castles of Haute-Savoie: Chablais, Faucigny, Genevois] (in French). Éditions Cabédita. pp. 37–38. ISBN 978-2-8829-5117-5.
- "Série : Comptes des châtellenies (XIIIe siècle-XVIe siècle). Fonds : Inventaire-Index des comptes de châtellenie et de subsides" [Series: Accounts of the castellanies (13th century-16th century). Collection: Inventory-Index of accounts of the castellanies and subsidies] (PDF). Chambéry : Archives départementales de la Savoie (in French). pp. 108–118. Archived from the original (PDF) on March 15, 2018.
