= Willy Delajod =

French football referee (born 1992)

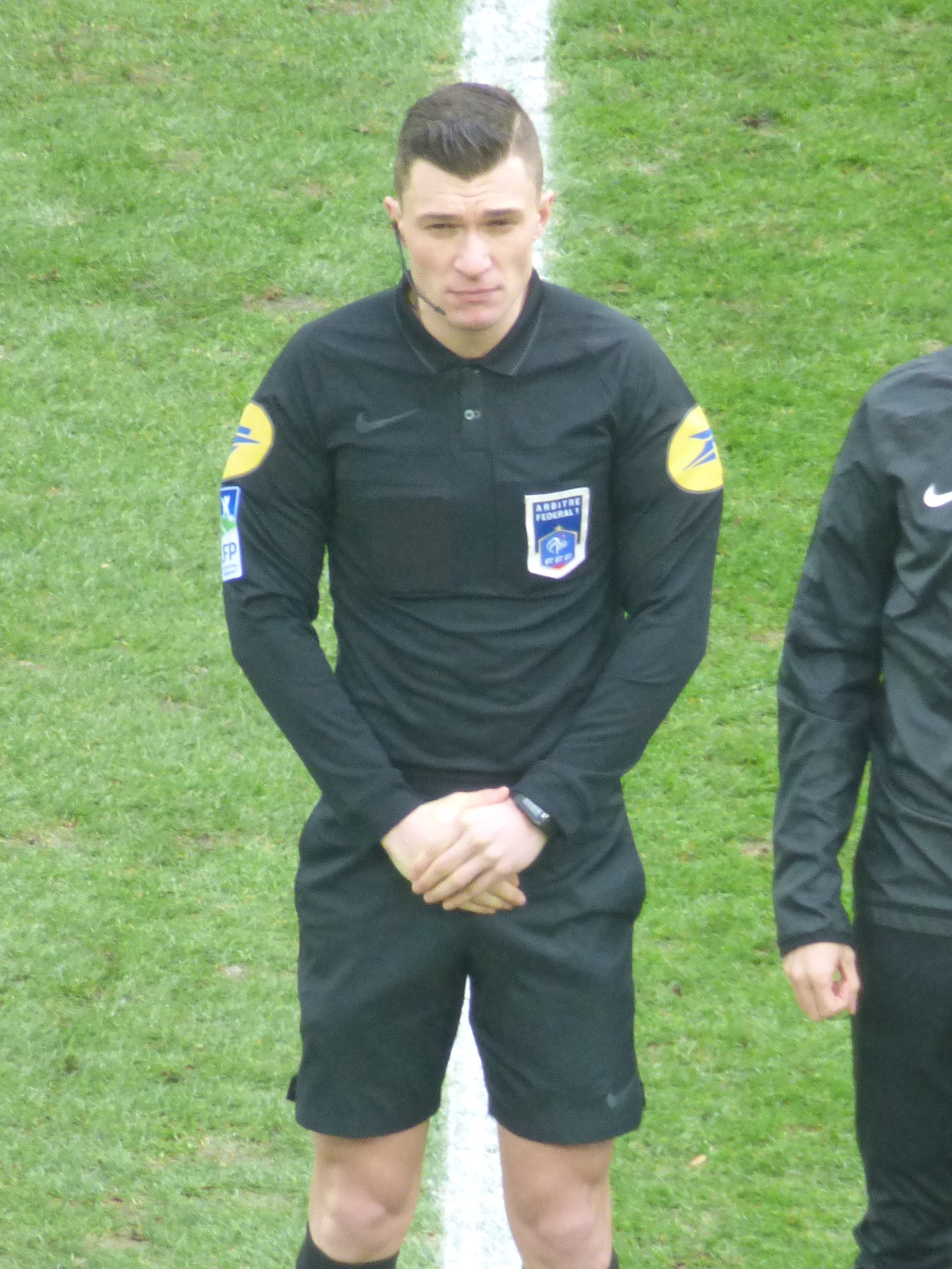
- Delajod in 2019
- Born: 25 September 1992 (age 34); Cornier, France
- Other occupation: Real estate agent

Domestic
Years	League	Role
2016–	Ligue 2	Referee
2018–	Ligue 1	Referee

International
Years	League	Role
2020–	FIFA listed	Referee
2021–	FIFA listed	Video official

Willy Delajod (born 25 September 1992) is a French International referee who officiates in Ligue 1. He is a FIFA referee, and is ranked as a UEFA first category referee.

== Refereeing career ==
Delajod began refereeing at the age of 13. He officiated his first match in Ligue 2 during the 2015–16 season, in a fixture between Valenciennes and Red Star on 29 January 2016. In doing so, he became the youngest referee to officiate a Ligue 2 match at the age of 23. In 2017, he was selected by the French Football Federation and UEFA to join the UEFA Centre of Refereeing Excellence (CORE) program, intended to prepare younger referees for the international level. Three years later, he was promoted to officiate in Ligue 1, starting in the 2018–19 season. He officiated his first match in the league on 11 August 2018 between Lille and Rennes, again setting a record as the youngest referee in league history at the age of 25.

In 2020, Delajod was added to the FIFA International Referees List. He officiated his first UEFA club competition match on 17 September 2020, a qualifying match in the 2020–21 UEFA Europa League between Teuta of Albania and Granada of Spain. He refereed his first UEFA international on 13 October 2020 in the 2021 UEFA European Under-21 Championship qualification competition between England and Turkey. In 2021, Delajod was also added as a video match official on the FIFA list. On 8 June 2021, he officiated his first senior international match, a friendly between Spain and Lithuania.

In 2021, Delajod was appointed as the video assistant referee for the 2020 Trophée des Champions held in January between Paris Saint-Germain and Marseille, as well as the 2021 Coupe de France Final in May between Monaco and Paris Saint-Germain. In January 2022, he was selected as a VAR official for the 2021 FIFA Club World Cup in the United Arab Emirates. He was also selected as the fourth official for the 2022 Coupe de France Final between Nice and Nantes. On 11 May 2022, UEFA named Delajod as an assistant VAR official for the 2022 UEFA Champions League Final between Liverpool of England and Real Madrid of Spain, officiated by his compatriot Clément Turpin.

Delajod has also officiated domestic matches outside of France. This includes in the 2020–21 Super League Greece between Aris and PAOK, as well as in the 2021–22 Primeira Liga between Paços de Ferreira and Braga.

On 7 May 2026, a month before the start of the 2026 FIFA World Cup, Delajod was appointed by FIFA to take part in the tournament as a VAR official following the removal of Dutch referee Rob Dieperink after he was arrested in England.

== Personal life ==
Delajod is a native of Cornier, Haute-Savoie, and works as a real estate agent.
