= Marcel Azzola =

French accordionist (1927–2019)

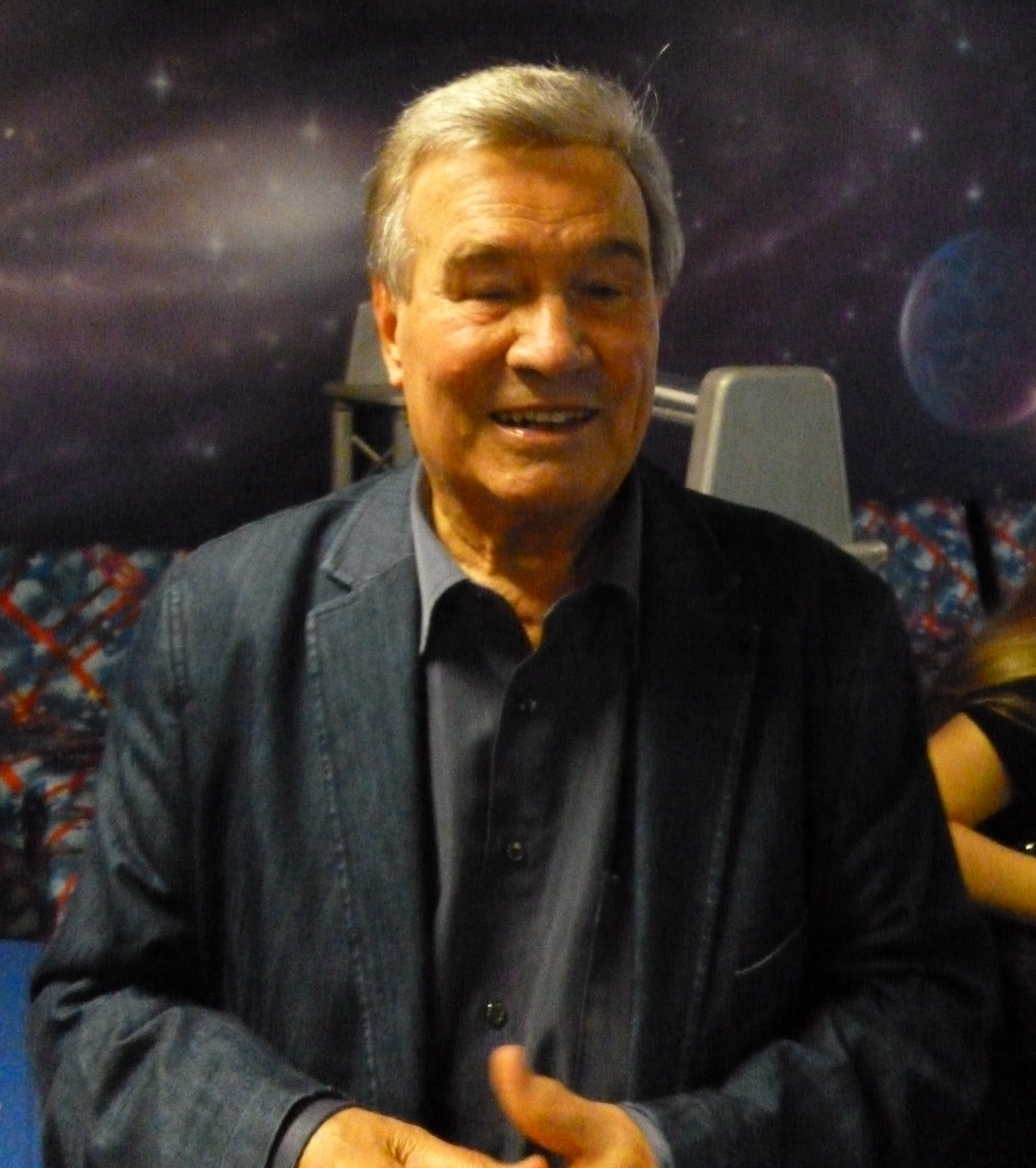
- Azzola in 2015

Background information
- Born: July 10, 1927; Paris, France
- Died: January 21, 2019 (aged 91) Villennes-sur-Seine, France
- Occupation: Musician
- Instrument: Accordion

Marcel Azzola (10 July 1927 – 21 January 2019) was a French accordionist.

He performed with Stan Getz and Jacques Brel, among others. The famous line "Chauffe, Marcel!" ("Heat up, Marcel") in Brel's song "Vesoul" refers to Azzola, who played the accordion during the recording.

== Biography ==
Marcel Azzola was born in Paris in 1927 to Italian parents: his father, Giuseppe (a builder, 1896–1978) and his mother, Angelina (1901–2002) both came from Bergamo. Marcel had two elder and two younger sisters. His parents had moved to France in 1922.

His father had conducted a mandolin orchestra in Italy, and Marcel, like two of his sisters, learned to play the violin. He abandoned the instrument after a year. In 1936, he began playing accordion, after he became familiar with the accordion orchestra of Pantin. Six months later, he started lessons with Paul Saive, who had been the music teacher of Jo Privat. Soon after, Azzola started taking lessons from Attilio Bonhommi instead. He accompanied Bonhommi during jazz concerts, first as a percussionist, and later as an accordionist.

At 11 years old and having just finished his primary education, Azzola became a professional accordionist. At first he played with the Aveugles de Pantin, but soon he switched to the "Orchestre de l'Amicale Accordéoniste de l'Humanité", a politically leftist orchestra. In 1939 he won first prize in the junior category at the Concours de Suresnes. At the outbreak of the Second World War, the Azzolas moved with Bonhommi to Draillant in the French Alps. Only his father Giuseppe remained in Pantin. After a year the family returned to Paris, and Azzola started taking lessons with Médard Ferrero. At the same time, he worked as an in-house accordionist in many bars in Paris. In 1943, he left Ferrero and studied under Jacques Mendel, until Mendel, who was Jewish, fled Paris in an unsuccessful attempt to hide from the Nazis. Azzola also became friends with Geo Daly, then still an accordionist but later primarily a vibraphone player. Daly introduced him to contemporary American jazz; most of Azzola's education up that point had centered on classical music and French musette and chanson.

After the liberation in 1944, Azzola continued to work in multiple bars and for organisations including the American headquarters of the Red Cross in France. He taught himself to play the bandoneon. In 1946, he travelled through Germany for six months to play for American soldiers.

In the 1950s, he recorded his first songs for Barclay Records and started collaborating with some of the greatest names of the French chanson, including Jacques Brel, Barbara, Yves Montand, Boris Vian, Edith Piaf, Gilbert Bécaud and Juliette Gréco. He also played with European jazz musicians Stéphane Grappelli and Toots Thielemans. He played on some soundtracks and his music can be heard in multiple Jacques Tati movies including Mon Oncle.

He taught music at the Ecole de Musique d'Orsay for more than 20 years. He was made a Commander (the highest rank) in the Ordre des Arts et des Lettres.

== Personal life ==
Azzola married Jacqueline, who died young. They had one daughter. Marcel died in January 2019 in Villennes-sur-Seine, where he lived with musician Lina Bossati.

== Discography ==
- Ball Musette (Polydor, 1959)
- Gipsy Waltz (EmArcy, 1989)
- L' Accordeoniste: Homage to Piaf (Polygram, 1995)
- Et Ca Tournait: Anthologie du Musette (Sony, 2000)
- Jazzola (Black & Blue, 2002)
- Le Meilleurs (Disky, 2002)
- 3 Temps Pour Bien Faire (Le Chant du Monde, 2005)
- Adios Muchachos (Intense, 2006)
- Les Grands Standards, Vol. 1 (Universal, 2006)
- Les Grands Standards, Vol. 2 (Universal, 2006)
- Musique a La Mode (Universal, 2007)
- Vignola Reunion Trio (Nel Jazz, 1999)
- Accordeon Seduction (Wagram, 2010)
- La Cumparsita (Sound and Vision, 2012)
- Les Archives de l'Accordéon (Marianne Melodie/Multiwaves, 2010)
- Vive le Musette (Parlophone, 2013)

With Stan Getz

- Mort d'un Pourri (Melba, 1977)
