= Lac de Pététoz =

Lake in France

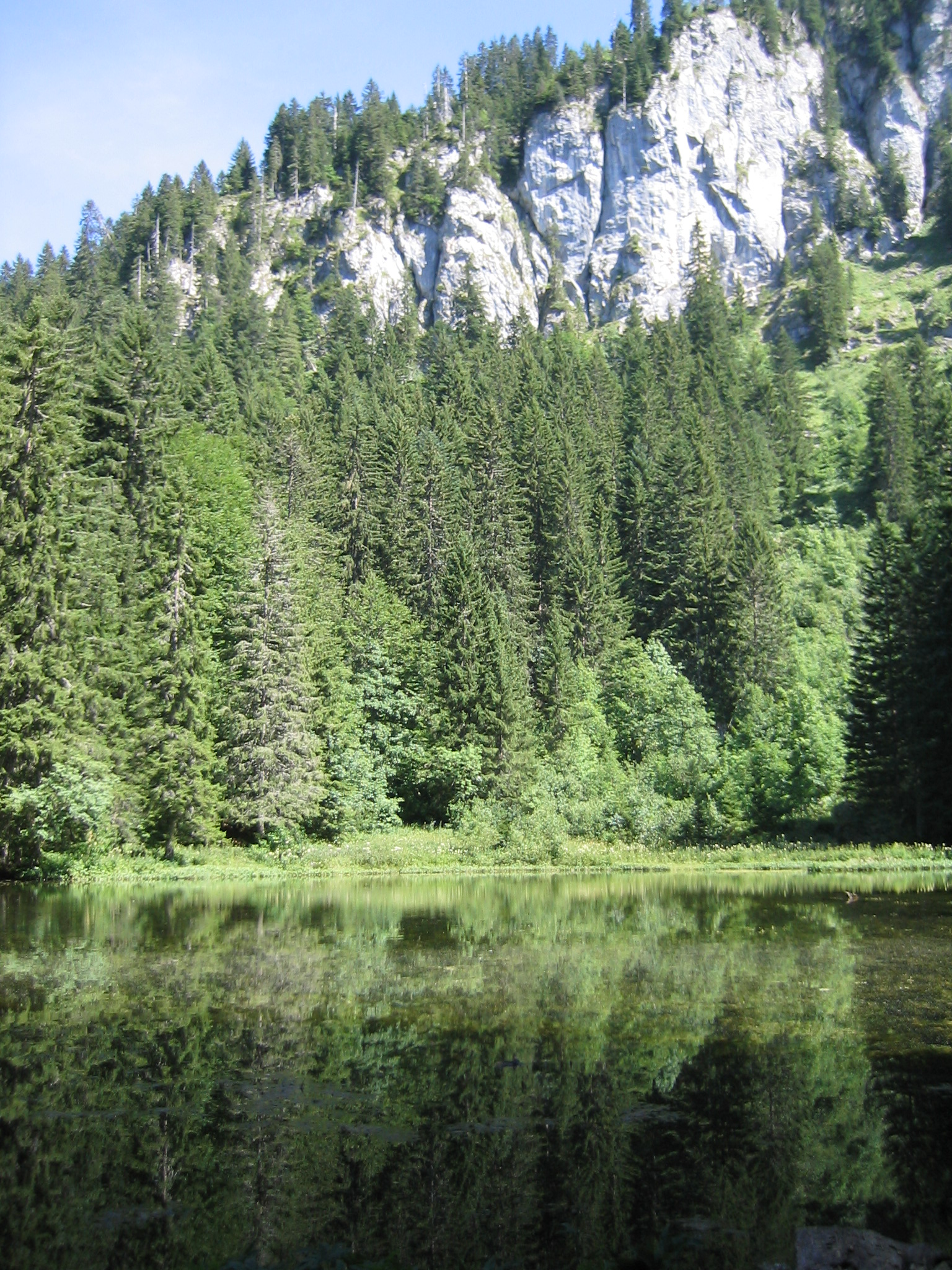

- Location within France
- Location: Bellevaux, Haute-Savoie
- Coordinates: 46.193611°N 6.5875°E
- Basin countries: France
- Surface area: 0.5 ha (1.2 acres)
- Surface elevation: 1,435 m (4,708 ft)

Lac de Pététoz is a lake in Haute-Savoie, France.
