= Canton of Thonon-les-Bains =

Coordinates: 46.37°N 6.48°E

The canton of Thonon-les-Bains is an administrative division of the Haute-Savoie department, southeastern France. It was created at the French canton reorganisation which came into effect in March 2015. Its seat is in Thonon-les-Bains.

It consists of the following communes:

1. Allinges
2. Armoy
3. Bellevaux
4. Cervens
5. Draillant
6. Lullin
7. Lyaud
8. Orcier
9. Perrignier
10. Reyvroz
11. Thonon-les-Bains
12. Vailly
