= Lac de Vallon =

Lake in France

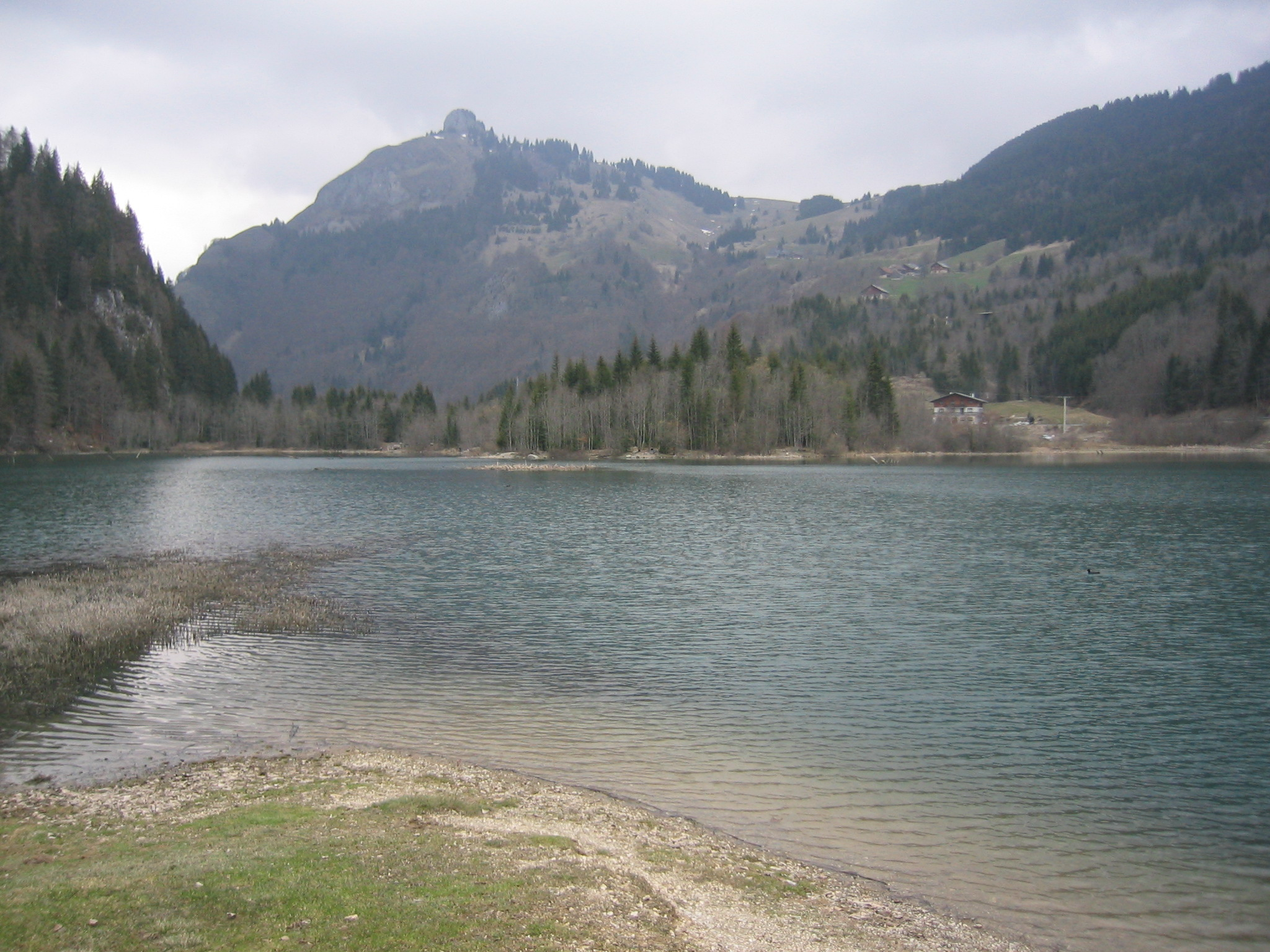

- Location within France
- Location: Bellevaux, Haute-Savoie
- Coordinates: 46°12′56″N 6°33′35″E
- Primary inflows: Brévon
- Primary outflows: Brévon
- Basin countries: France
- Surface area: 15 ha (37 acres)
- Max. depth: 16 m (52 ft)
- Surface elevation: 1,080 m (3,540 ft)
- Frozen: Winter

Lac de Vallon is a lake at Bellevaux in the Haute-Savoie department of France. The lake formed in 1943 when a landslide blocked the flow of the Brévon river. It is within the Chablais UNESCO Global Geopark.
