= Vailly, Haute-Savoie =

Vailly
- Commune
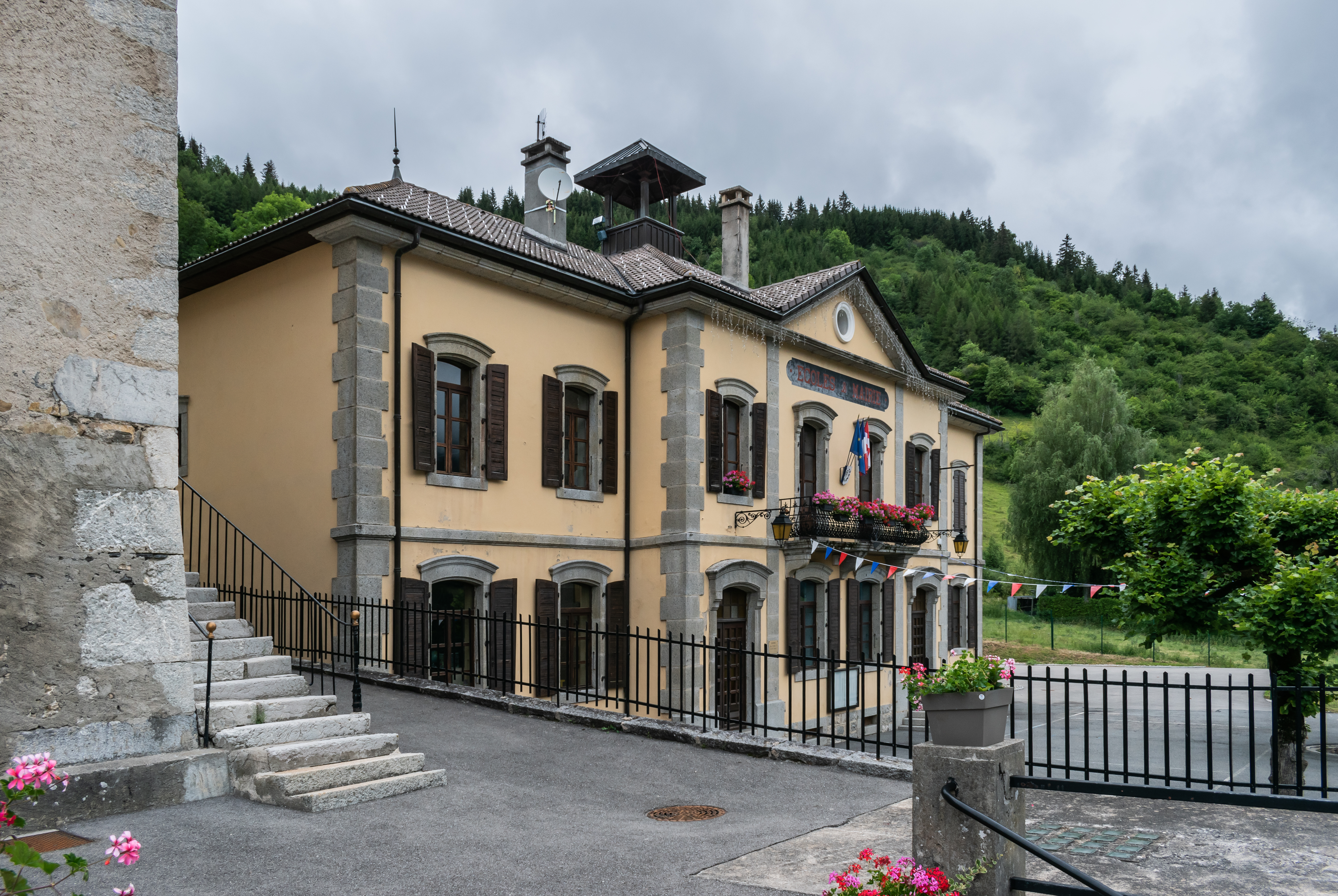
- Town hall

- Coat of arms
- Location of Vailly
- Location within France Location within Auvergne-Rhône-Alpes
- Coordinates: 46°18′18″N 6°32′42″E
- Country: France
- Region: Auvergne-Rhône-Alpes
- Department: Haute-Savoie
- Arrondissement: Thonon-les-Bains
- Canton: Thonon-les-Bains
- Intercommunality: Haut-Chablais

Government
  - Mayor (2020–2026): Yannick Trabichet
- Area^{1}: 18.89 km^{2} (7.29 sq mi)
- Highest elevation: 1,894 m (6,214 ft)
- Lowest elevation: 630 m (2,070 ft)
- Population (2023): 907
  - Density: 48.0/km^{2} (124/sq mi)
- Demonym: Vailliérand / Vailliérande
- Time zone: UTC+01:00 (CET)
  - Summer (DST): UTC+02:00 (CEST)
- INSEE/Postal code: 74287 /74470
- Website: Vailly74.fr
- ^{1} French Land Register data, which excludes lakes, ponds, glaciers > 1 km^{2} (0.386 sq mi or 247 acres) and river estuaries.

Vailly (French pronunciation: [vaji]; Arpitan: Vâlyi) is a commune in the Haute-Savoie department in the Auvergne-Rhône-Alpes region in south-eastern France.

== See also ==
- Communes of the Haute-Savoie department
