= Allinges =

Allinges Alinzho (Savoyard)
- Commune
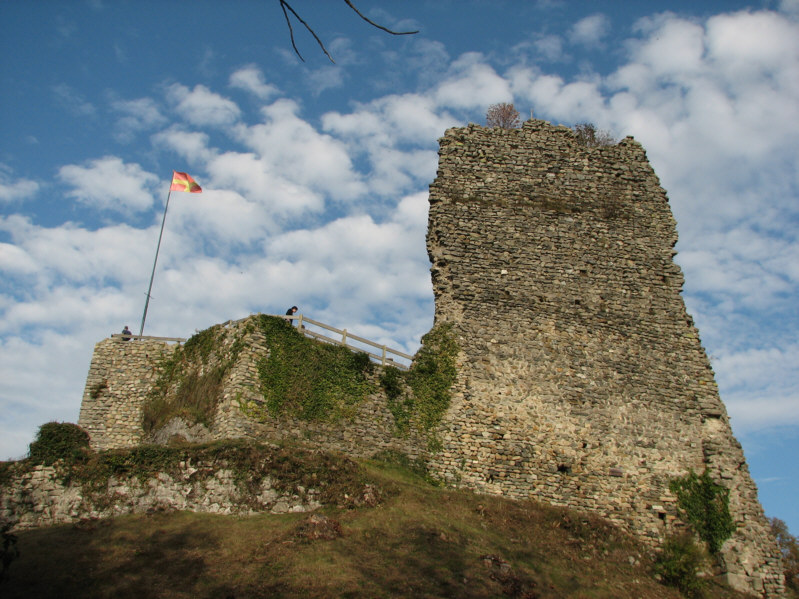
- Ruins of the old castle at Allinges

- Coat of arms
- Location of Allinges
- Location within France Location within Auvergne-Rhône-Alpes
- Coordinates: 46°20′09″N 6°27′51″E
- Country: France
- Region: Auvergne-Rhône-Alpes
- Department: Haute-Savoie
- Arrondissement: Thonon-les-Bains
- Canton: Thonon-les-Bains
- Intercommunality: Thonon Agglomération

Government
  - Mayor (2020–2026): François Deville
- Area^{1}: 15.01 km^{2} (5.80 sq mi)
- Highest elevation: 750 m (2,460 ft)
- Lowest elevation: 438 m (1,437 ft)
- Population (2023): 5,019
  - Density: 334.4/km^{2} (866.0/sq mi)
- Demonym: Allingeois / Allingeoises
- Time zone: UTC+01:00 (CET)
  - Summer (DST): UTC+02:00 (CEST)
- INSEE/Postal code: 74005 /74200
- ^{1} French Land Register data, which excludes lakes, ponds, glaciers > 1 km^{2} (0.386 sq mi or 247 acres) and river estuaries.

Allinges (French pronunciation: [alɛ̃ʒ]; Savoyard: Alinzho) is a commune in the Haute-Savoie department in south-eastern France.

== Population ==
Historical population
Year	Pop.	±% p.a.
1968	1,115	—
1975	1,576	+5.07%
1982	2,098	+4.17%
1990	2,627	+2.85%
1999	3,021	+1.56%
2007	3,549	+2.03%
2012	4,137	+3.11%
2017	4,459	+1.51%
2023	5,019	+1.99%
Source: INSEE

== See also ==
- Communes of the Haute-Savoie department
