= Orcier =

- Commune
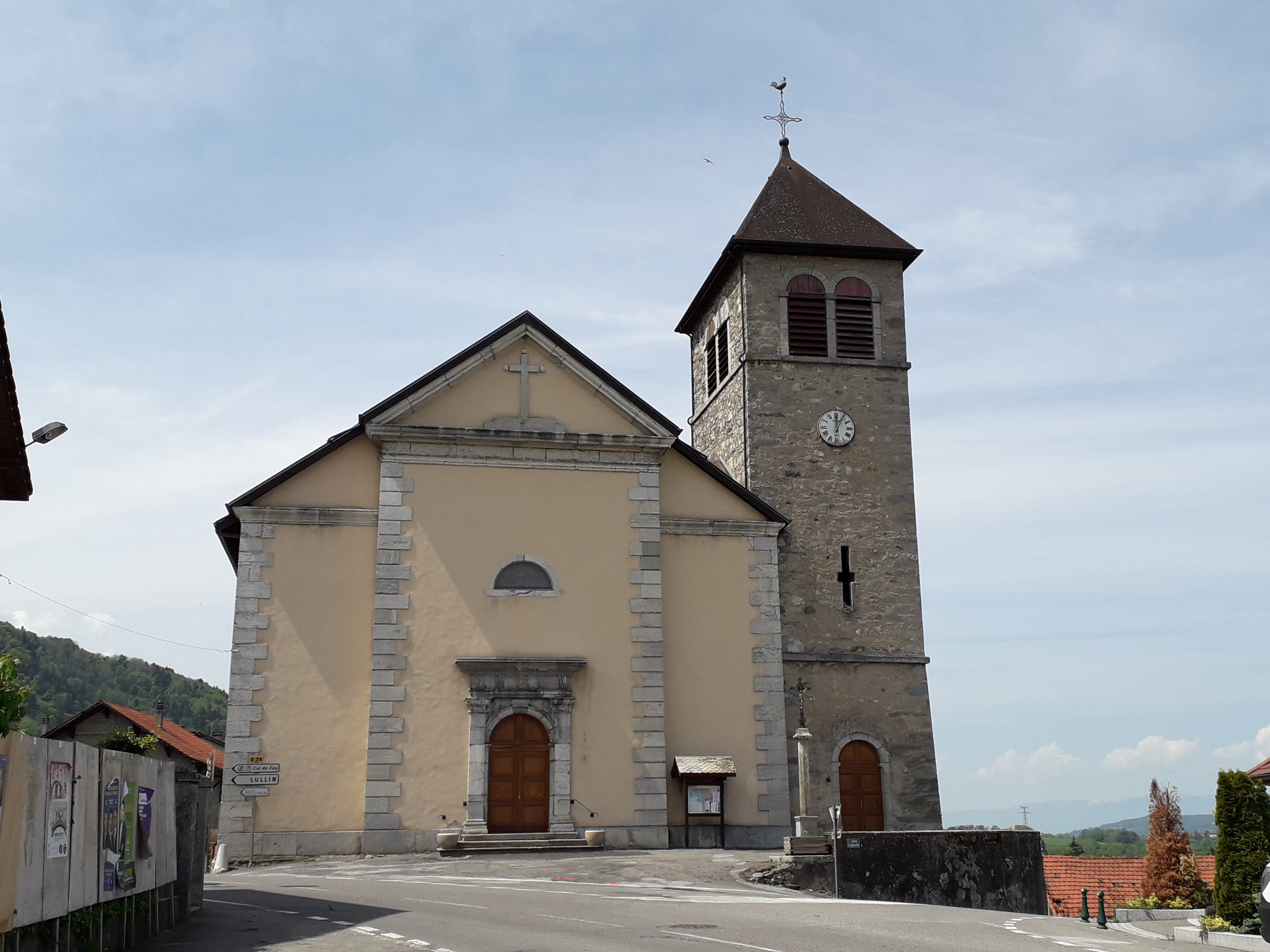
- Church of Saint-Jacques

- Coat of arms
- Location of Orcier
- Location within France Location within Auvergne-Rhône-Alpes
- Coordinates: 46°18′47″N 6°29′33″E
- Country: France
- Region: Auvergne-Rhône-Alpes
- Department: Haute-Savoie
- Arrondissement: Thonon-les-Bains
- Canton: Thonon-les-Bains
- Intercommunality: Thonon Agglomération

Government
  - Mayor (2020–2026): Catherine Martinerie
- Area^{1}: 9.39 km^{2} (3.63 sq mi)
- Highest elevation: 1,413 m (4,636 ft)
- Lowest elevation: 576 m (1,890 ft)
- Population (2023): 1,079
  - Density: 115/km^{2} (298/sq mi)
- Time zone: UTC+01:00 (CET)
  - Summer (DST): UTC+02:00 (CEST)
- INSEE/Postal code: 74206 /74550
- ^{1} French Land Register data, which excludes lakes, ponds, glaciers > 1 km^{2} (0.386 sq mi or 247 acres) and river estuaries.

Orcier (French pronunciation: [ɔʁsje]; Arpitan: Orciér) is a commune in the Haute-Savoie department in the Auvergne-Rhône-Alpes region in south-eastern France.

== Population ==
Historical population
Year	Pop.	±% p.a.
1968	364	—
1975	401	+1.39%
1982	543	+4.43%
1990	594	+1.13%
1999	686	+1.61%
2007	786	+1.72%
2012	845	+1.46%
2017	981	+3.03%
2023	1,079	+1.60%
Source: INSEE

== See also ==
- Communes of the Haute-Savoie department
