= History of Savoy from 1416 to 1792 =

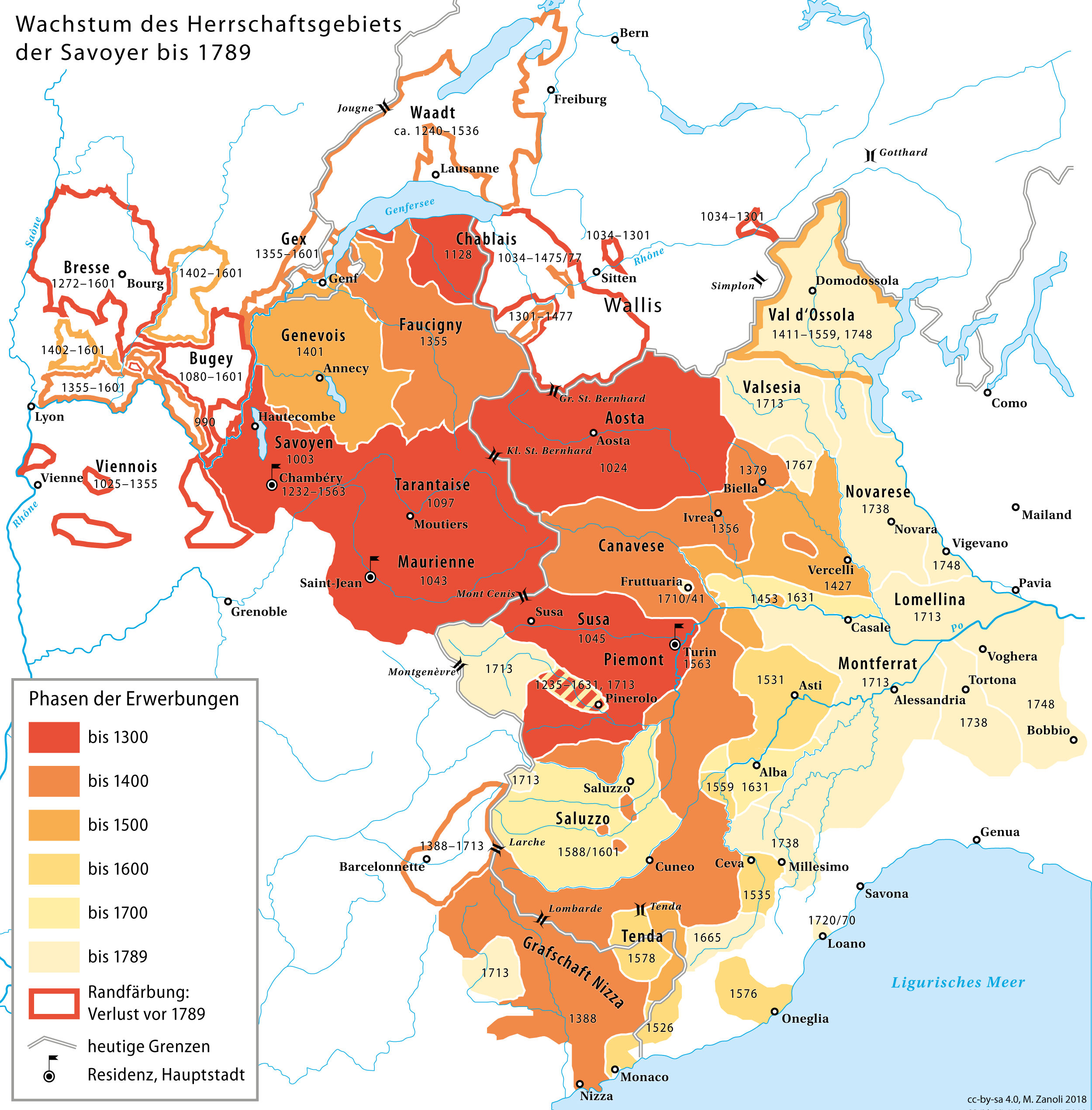
Territorial evolution of the States of Savoy from 1300 to 1789 Before 1300 From 1300 to 1400 From 1400 to 1500 From 1500 to 1600 From 1600 to 1700 From 1700 to 1789

The history of Savoy from 1416 to 1792 begins with the elevation of the County of Savoy to a duchy in 1416 and ends with the annexation of the territory by French Revolutionary troops in 1792. This period corresponds to what is commonly called the early modern period.

During this time, the Savoyard principality asserted its power and control over the western Alpine passes. However, it also suffered setbacks against its powerful neighbor, the Kingdom of France, notably in 1601 when it lost the territory of Bresse. The period was also marked by occupations of the duchy by France in 1536–1559, 1600–1601, 1689, and again between 1703 and 1713. These French threats made the dukes of Savoy aware of the vulnerability of their capital, Chambéry, located relatively close to the Franco-Savoyard border. Duke Emmanuel Philibert, known as Ironhead, decided in 1562 to transfer the capital to the Italian side of the Alps, beyond the mountains, to the city of Turin. Savoy was no longer the heart of the principality. Spanish troops also occupied the region between 1742 and 1749. This early modern period ended with a new occupation in 1792 by Revolutionary forces.

== Savoy in the 15th century ==
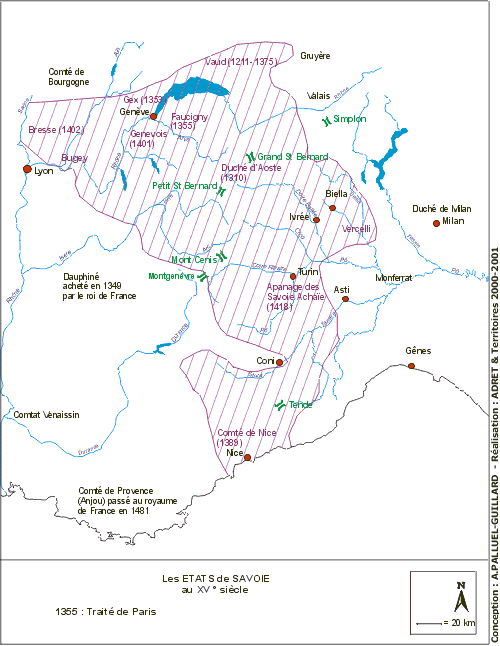

=== Expansion of the duchy ===
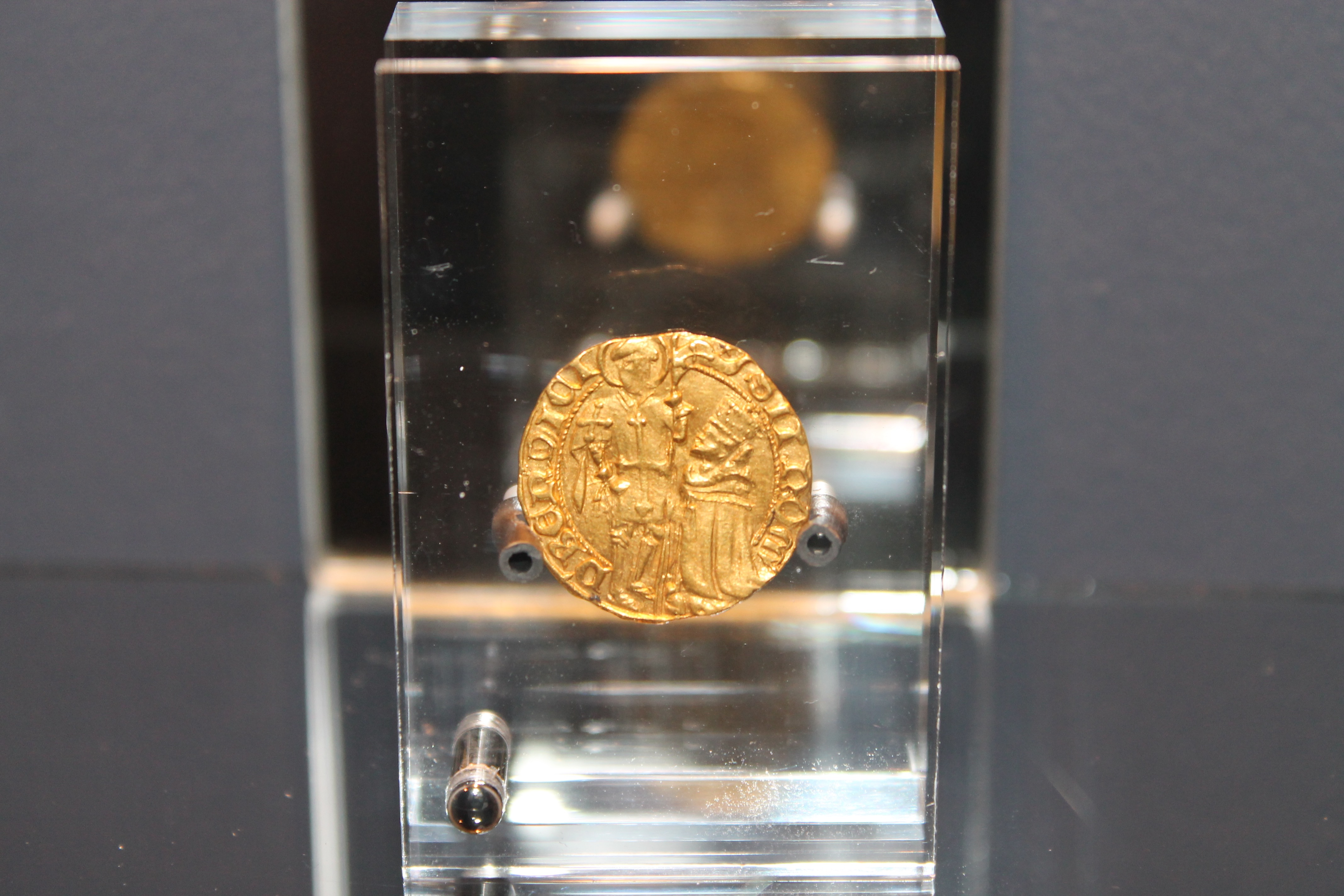
Gold ducat (1430, Monetary Museum, Lausanne), minted to celebrate the elevation of the county to a duchy. Amadeus, wearing the ducal mantle and cap, kneels before Saint Maurice, the patron saint of Savoy.

Most authors, such as Robert Avezou, consider the reign of Amadeus VIII (1416–1451) to be the apogee of the Savoyard state. On 19 February 1416, the County of Savoy was elevated to a duchy by Emperor Sigismund, who, while passing through Chambéry, rewarded the noble spirit, uprightness, and prudence of the valiant knight Amadeus VIII. This hereditary title was transmitted to his male descendants by primogeniture, eventually leading to the titles of King of Sicily, then King of Sardinia, and finally King of Italy.

In 1418, the ducal domain expanded with the definitive attachment of Piedmont, following the death without issue of Louis of Achaea, who designated his brother-in-law Amadeus VIII as his heir. By 1430, the State of Savoy included, in addition to Savoy proper (the Chambéry region), Bugey, Bresse, Chablais, Faucigny, Genevois, Geneva , and the Pays de Vaud, Maurienne and Tarentaise, the valleys of Aosta and Susa, the appanage of Piedmont, and the County of Nice. The court of Amadeus VIII was brilliant, with around three hundred dignitaries, and the Château de Chambéry displayed its full splendor, except perhaps for its chapel, which was not yet completed. The House of Savoy controlled the Alpine passes from Valais to the Mediterranean Sea. Positioned between French, German, Spanish, and Austrian monarchies, the Savoyard rulers became key players in European diplomacy through their alliances.

On 7 November 1434, at Ripaille, Amadeus VIII announced that he was renouncing sovereignty in favor of his son Louis and would retire to a hermitage with six companions. On the same day, he received the habit and hood of a hermit from the prior. Nevertheless, he continued to advise and effectively govern until 1440. He formally abdicated in favor of Duke Louis I on 6 January 1440.

Amadeus VIII was elected pope on 5 November 1439 under the name Felix V. However, Eugene IV continued his pontificate until his death on 22 February 1447, after which he was succeeded by Nicholas V. Most Catholic rulers rejected Felix V as an antipope. He abdicated by a bull dated 7 April 1449 and retired once more to Ripaille. Pope Nicholas V later appointed him administrator of the dioceses of Geneva and Lausanne. Amadeus VIII died in Geneva on 7 January 1451.

=== Reforms: Statuta Sabaudiae ===
After being elevated to ducal rank, Amadeus VIII asked jurists to revise and unify the various laws in force across the territories of the duchy. This new constitution became known as the Statuta Sabaudiae (“Statutes of Savoy”) or the Universal Reforms of Savoy.

- The Chancellor of Savoy was the second-ranking figure in the state after the sovereign. He presided over the Itinerant Council, a kind of senate responsible for diplomatic, financial, and judicial affairs. Its members were appointed for life by the duke from among the nobility and senior officials.
- The Assemblies of the Three Estates were intended to link the duke and the people. These functioned somewhat like Estates-General, meeting in various locations and voting on taxes, which still retained an extraordinary character.
- A Resident Council seated in Chambéry formed the highest judicial authority. In the provinces, justice was administered by magistrates, while at the local level it was handled by ordinary judges and castellans. This state justice coexisted, until the mid-18th century, with seigneurial justice.

While the Statutes codified institutions and affirmed that all justice derived from God, they left aside what is now called civil law. Obligations were left to the discretion of the parties involved, and their formalization was handled by notaries, who were ubiquitous. In the town of Rumilly alone, forty notaries have been identified.

Amadeus VIII also advanced civilization by abolishing the Judgment of God, recalling the case of Othon III of Grandson, who had been unjustly accused and, on 7 August 1397, paid with his life for a crime he had not committed.

=== Public services in the 15th century ===
What we today call public services, foremost among them education and public assistance, did not fall within the responsibilities of princes and lords in the 15th century. When they did contribute, “one might be tempted to attribute the character of private generosity to the expenditures of princes in these areas, if one did not know how indistinct the boundaries were between their personal wealth and the profits of their government”. The Church, however, regarded education as part of its mission. In Savoy, in particular, before the 15th century, both clerics and educated laypeople were trained in episcopal schools and monasteries. At the village level, some zealous priests also provided instruction.

Alongside ecclesiastical institutions, towns such as Chambéry and Montmélian also paid “schoolmasters.” From the 15th century onward, private patronage also developed: a custom that lasted until the 18th century encouraged the wealthiest individuals to bequeath part of their property to support the education of youth. Thus, small colleges appeared, funded by towns and private individuals. These institutions supplied the large numbers of notaries required in Savoy, but also produced more prominent figures such as Guillaume Fichet, who became rector of the University of Paris and was educated at the college of La Roche-sur-Foron.

In general, however, the intellectual elite—that is, the magistrates, and members of the Councils and the Chamber of Accounts—had to complete their education at major European universities such as Paris, Pavia, or Avignon. The general population remained largely illiterate, as was the case throughout Europe. Despite the admiration that may be felt for the archaeological remains of the period and the relative prosperity of the States of Savoy, in cultural terms, Savoy remained, at the beginning of the Renaissance, provincial—dependent on and imitative of developments in France or Italy. A very large number of hospitals were scattered throughout historic Savoy.

== Decline of the Savoyard state (1440–1553) ==
=== Reign of Duke Louis I of Savoy (1440–1465) ===
Duke Louis I of Savoy, Prince of Piedmont, succeeded his father, Duke Amadeus VIII (1383–1451), following the latter's abdication on 6 January 1440.

During the reign of Louis I, the government of the Duchy of Savoy was subject to the “caprices” of Anne of Lusignan (1418–1462), his wife. The latter, daughter of King Janus of Cyprus, was surrounded at the court of Chambéry, and later at Ripaille Castle (Thonon), by Cypriot courtiers whose influence over political decisions is considered by historiography to have contributed to a certain decline of the state. Intrigue and corruption at the Savoyard court led to growing disaffection among the Savoyard people, the nobility, and even the third son of Duke Louis I, Philip Without Land, the future Duke Philip II of Savoy. He notably became implicated in the murder of the chancellor, Jacques de Valpergue (de Valperga), who was drowned in a sack in Lake Geneva.

The participation of Duke Louis I in the Milanese succession war in 1447—when the duchy fell into the hands of his ally Francesco Sforza—and in the expedition to Cyprus exhausted the state's finances.

In 1452, Duke Louis I and his wife acquired the Holy Shroud, which was carefully deposited in the Franciscan church of Chambéry. It was later transferred to the Sainte-Chapelle of Chambéry in 1502. In 1578, the Shroud was permanently installed in Turin by Duke Emmanuel Philibert of Savoy.

During the twenty-six years of his reign, Duke Louis I relinquished the rights of his house over the Diois and the Valentinois. He sold the principality of the Dombes to the Duke of Bourbon, the barony of Gex to the Count of Dunois, and restored Domodossola to the Duke of Milan.

Despite these considerations, one characteristic feature of the reign of Louis I of Savoy should be noted. Through a policy of marital alliances, he secured the protection of the Kingdom of France. However, this powerful neighbor would sometimes prove burdensome, even invasive, for future generations: his daughter Charlotte of Savoy married in 1451 the Dauphin of France, the future King Louis XI. She became the mother of King Charles VIII. His son and successor, Amadeus IX, married in 1452 Yolande of France, daughter of King Charles VII and sister of Louis XI. Duke Louis I thus became the maternal great-grandfather of King Francis I, son of Louise of Savoy.

=== Reign of Duke Amadeus IX of Savoy (1465–1472) ===
Amadeus IX succeeded his father Louis I of Savoy, who died on 29 January 1465 in Lyon.

Duke Amadeus IX suffered from epilepsy. He entrusted the government to his wife, Yolande of France. She faced opposition from her brother-in-law, Philip Without Land, who sought to replace his ailing brother. However, Yolande, a strong-willed woman, retained political control of the States of Savoy. She limited concessions to granting her brother-in-law the appanage of the county of Bresse, after which he became known as Philip of Bresse.

Faced with threats from Philip of Bresse, she decided to move with her court to Vercelli, under the protection of her neighbor, the Duke of Milan. Amadeus IX died in Vercelli in 1472 at the age of 35. His life was regarded as exemplary. Saint Francis de Sales obtained his beatification from Pope Paul V in 1677.

=== Regency of Yolande of France ===
The young Duke Philibert I of Savoy, son of Amadeus IX, succeeded his father in 1472 at the age of seven. The barons assembled at Vercelli and appointed his mother, the duchess, as regent of the States of Savoy.

Philip of Bresse, who coveted power, secured the protection of King Louis XI against his rival, the Duke of Burgundy, Charles the Bold, an ally of Savoy. After suffering a heavy defeat at the Battle of Morat on 22 June 1476 against the Swiss Confederates allied with Louis XI, he feared a reversal of alliances. He abducted the duchess at Gex, while the young Duke Philibert, taken in by an officer of the Savoyard court, was placed under the protection of his uncle John Louis of Savoy, Bishop of Geneva.

In the absence of the duchess, King Louis XI assumed the regency of the States of Savoy and sent Philip of Bresse to Turin as lieutenant-general. In 8 July, Duchess Yolande managed to escape from Burgundy. She withdrew to Chambéry before going to Piedmont, where she died in 1478.

Her son, the young Duke Philibert I of Savoy, died on 22 April 1482 in Lyon at the age of 17, without having truly exercised power. King Louis XI maintained his control through the governor Louis de Seyssel (1445–1517), who administered the country jointly with Count Philip of Bresse.

=== Reign of Duke Charles I of Savoy (1482–1490) ===
Duke Charles I of Savoy (1468–1490), third child of Amadeus IX, succeeded his brother Philibert I in 1482.

At the age of 14, shortly after his accession, Charles I succeeded in distancing his uncle Philip of Bresse, who had intended to continue governing the state in his stead. Philip of Bresse was appointed governor of the Dauphiné in 1485, during the reign of the young Charles VIII, aged 15, who had just succeeded his father, Louis XI.

Charles I's reign was overshadowed by conflict between the States of Savoy and the Marquisate of Saluzzo. When the Marquis of Saluzzo refused to pay homage for his fief to the Duke of Savoy, the latter launched war on 8 July. Savoyard forces captured Pancalieri and laid siege to Saluzzo, which surrendered after three months of resistance. The Marquisate of Saluzzo thus came under the control of the Duke of Savoy.

However, through the mediation of King Charles VIII, negotiations were initiated to restore peace between the two parties. The death of Duke Charles I at Pinerolo on 14 March 1490 interrupted these talks. It fell to his successor to continue the negotiations.

=== Regency of Blanche of Montferrat (1490–1496) ===
The Duchy of Savoy and other Italian states in 1494.

The young Duke Charles John Amadeus of Savoy succeeded his father Charles I of Savoy, who died in 1490 at Pinerolo. This child, less than one year old, was raised by his mother, Blanche of Montferrat (1472–1515), Duchess of Savoy. The ducal council confirmed her as regent, much to the displeasure of Count Philip of Bresse, who continued to claim power but was unable to obtain it.

The duchess had to continue the negotiations left unresolved at the death of Duke Charles I. On 24 July 1490, she signed a treaty agreeing to withdraw garrisons from the Saluzzo region and to restore the territories conquered by the late duke.

After the death of Francis of Savoy, governor of the Duchy of Savoy, on 3 October 1490, the duchess moved closer to the Count of Bresse and appointed him governor-general of the States of Savoy. He was thus in a position to assume the succession if necessary.

The duchess diplomatically permitted King Charles VIII of France to cross her territories to campaign in Italy. At the head of a powerful army, Charles VIII began the Italian Wars in 1494.

=== Reign of Duke Philip II of Savoy (1496–1497) ===
Duke Philip II of Savoy, formerly known as Philip of Bresse, succeeded his grandnephew Charles John Amadeus, who died at the age of seven in Moncalieri on 19 April 1496. He had long-awaited this elevation, achieving it only after the age of 50 and for a reign of less than two years. He died at the Lémenc Monastery (Chambéry) on 7 November 1497.

From his marriage to Margaret of Bourbon, Duke Philip II was the father of Princess Louise of Savoy (1476–1531). She married Charles of Orléans, Duke of Angoulême, and became the mother of King Francis I.

=== Reign of Duke Philibert II of Savoy (1497–1504) ===
Duke Philibert II of Savoy succeeded his father, Philip II, who died in Chambéry on 7 November 1497.

In 1501, he married his second wife, Margaret of Austria, daughter of Emperor Maximilian I. She later became the godmother of Charles V. This prestigious alliance would shape the future diplomatic orientation of the House of Savoy. Chroniclers would later recount the military exploits of Duke Emmanuel Philibert of Savoy, commander-in-chief of the armies of his uncle Charles V and his cousin Philip II of Spain. Between the 17th and 18th centuries, Prince Eugene of Savoy would become commander-in-chief of the armies of the Holy Roman Empire and take part in the conflicts his cousin Victor Amadeus II waged against the forces of King Louis XIV.

Duke Philibert II died without issue on 10 September 1504. He was buried in the magnificent Royal Monastery of Brou, built by his wife Margaret of Austria. She later became governor of the Habsburg Netherlands and negotiated with her sister-in-law Louise of Savoy the Treaty of Cambrai on 5 August 1529, known as the Ladies' Peace.

=== The reign of Charles III the Good (1504–1553) and the first French occupation (1536) ===
Charles III of Savoy succeeded his brother Philibert II, Duke of Savoy, who died on 10 September 1504 at Pont-d'Ain. In 1514, he granted his brother Philip of Savoy (1490–1533), the future Duke of Nemours, the appanage of the Genevois and the baronies of Faucigny and Beaufort.

His reign was marked by events generally considered unfortunate. The historian Henri Ménabréa saw in them the mark of a weakness of character in this ruler, whom he nevertheless described as gifted and very honest, while the archivist Robert Avezou instead emphasized "the intrinsic mechanisms of regional history".

==== 1515: The failure of the project to establish a bishopric in Chambéry ====
Before the reign of Charles III, there was no bishopric in the Savoyard capital. The city of Chambéry was under the jurisdiction of the Bishop of Grenoble and the Archbishop of Vienne. The King of France had always opposed the creation of a bishopric in Chambéry.

As compensation, Amadeus IX, Duke of Savoy, invoking the cult attached to the veneration of the Shroud of Turin, had only obtained the creation of the chapter of the Sainte-Chapelle of the Château de Chambéry by a bull dated 21 April 1467 from Pope Paul II. Directly subject to the jurisdiction of the Holy See, the dean, who held the rank of bishop, was authorized to wear the mitre, the ring, and the pastoral staff in the presence of the duke and duchess on feast days.

In 1515, Charles III, following in the footsteps of his predecessors, attempted unsuccessfully to obtain the establishment of a bishopric in Chambéry, having already chosen the Savoyard Urbain de Miolans for the position. The Bishop of Grenoble, supported by the Archbishop of Vienne and King Francis I of France, opposed the project. The bull of 21 May 1515 issued by Pope Leo X was annulled. It was not until 1779 that the Roman Catholic Archdiocese of Chambéry was finally created, by a bull of Pope Pius VI dated 18 August 1779.

==== 1526: Conflicts and the secession of Geneva ====
Another challenge for Charles III was the loss of Geneva. Traditionally, authority over the city had been shared among the bishop, the House of Savoy, and the municipal councils representing the bourgeoisie. This three-way arrangement created persistent tensions, with the bourgeois pushing for greater independence while the bishop aligned with Charles III. At the same time, the citizens of Geneva secretly allied themselves with the Swiss cantons, while Martin Luther wrote the famous propositions that would lead to the Protestant Reformation, of which Geneva would become a major center.

After numerous skirmishes, on 10 September 1525, the duke entered Geneva with ten thousand men and convened the so-called Council of the Halberdiers in the cloister of St. Pierre Cathedral in an attempt to suppress the rebels. In vain, as on 12 March 1526, the Genevan bourgeois ratified a treaty of combourgeoisie with Fribourg and Bern.

The bishop, Pierre de La Baume, left Geneva in July 1527. Charles III abandoned the vidomnat and the Château de l’Isle, where his lieutenant and castellan, who served as judges of first instance in civil matters, had resided.

For five years, Genevans and Savoyards engaged in indecisive fighting. The Genevan council eventually secured the Treaty of Saint-Julien on 19 October 1530, granting independence. On 27 August 1535, Geneva abolished Catholic worship and decreed that the Reformed religion would henceforth be the only one practiced in the city. The former chapter of Geneva was permanently established in Annecy.

==== 1536: Invasion and occupation by France, Bern, and Valais ====
Following the secession of Geneva, Savoy became entangled in the renewed conflict between the kings of France and the House of Habsburg. The wife of Charles III, Beatrice of Portugal, Duchess of Savoy, sister-in-law of Charles V, Holy Roman Emperor, openly showed her sympathies for him.

Although Savoy had been allied with Francis I of France in 1525 at the Battle of Pavia, it was now presumed to have shifted toward the opposing camp. The King of France, determined to launch a campaign into Italy, first sought to secure control over Savoy and Piedmont.

In 1536, French troops entered Savoy together with the Bernese and the Valaisans. The forces of Charles III offered only weak resistance; only the citadel of Nice remained unconquered. The country was not only occupied but also partitioned. The Bernese seized the Vaud and established themselves in Thonon-les-Bains, the Pays de Gex, and part of the Genevois. The Valaisans occupied Évian-les-Bains, the Abondance Valley, the Pays de Gavot, and the Aulps Valley, where they supported Catholic institutions.

Charles III was left with only Vercelli, a few strongholds in eastern Piedmont, the Aosta Valley, and Nice. The French policy of occupation in Savoy respected local customs and encountered little resistance. Savoy came close to becoming permanently French; however, in 1559, the Treaty of Cateau-Cambrésis enabled Duke Emmanuel Philibert to recover the provinces that had been occupied by France since 1536.

Overall, notwithstanding a few local reactions that were quickly subdued, the French occupation had a profound influence on an entire generation of Savoyards during the twenty-three years from 1536 to 1559. Historians generally agree that it was beneficial for Savoy, which had lost its unfortunate duke, who had taken refuge in Nice and later in Vercelli. While respecting local customs, the French introduced reforms and improvements in the administration of the country. As early as 1536, Francis I reorganized the judicial system by establishing the Parliament of Chambéry, restoring the Chamber of Accounts, maintaining the Présidial of Annecy, and instituting bailiffs in Savoy, Maurienne, Tarentaise, Bresse, and Bugey. Most of the holders of these offices were Savoyards, and their experience enabled Duke Emmanuel Philibert to reorganize his state from 1559 onward.

It should also be noted that the Ordinance of Villers-Cotterêts of 1539 allowed Savoy to draft judicial acts in French, to distinguish between civil, criminal, and ecclesiastical jurisdictions, to reorganize the notarial system, and to create parish registers, the predecessors of modern civil registers. French would become the administrative language under Emmanuel Philibert following an edict of 11 or 15 February 1560, replacing Latin in court records.

Finally, by occupying Savoy, the French did not intend to annex the country, as shown by the attitude of King Henry II, who in 1550 refused to merge the Parliament of Chambéry with that of Grenoble.

== Restoration of the States of Savoy (1553–1580) ==
=== The reign of Duke Emmanuel Philibert of Savoy (1553–1580) ===
Duke Emmanuel Philibert succeeded his father, Charles III, who died on 17 August 1553. His reign is characterized by three major events: the victory of Saint-Quentin (1557), the Treaty of Cateau-Cambrésis (1559), and the transfer of the capital from Chambéry to Turin (1562).

==== 1557: Victory of Saint-Quentin ====
When he inherited the ducal crown in 1553, the young Emmanuel Philibert controlled only fragments of territory free from French occupation. As a military leader, nicknamed “Ironhead,” he won the Battle of Saint-Quentin on 10 August 1557 against the French forces of King Henry II, serving as commander-in-chief of the imperial armies of his cousin, King Philip II of Spain, successor to Charles V.

==== 1559: Treaty of Cateau-Cambrésis ====
Not only did the Treaty of Cateau-Cambrésis of 25 April 1559 restore the States of Savoy, including Bresse, Bugey, and the Pays de Gex, but it also provided the duke with a wife, Princess Margaret of France, daughter of Francis I and sister of King Henry II. The new Duchess of Savoy used her diplomatic skills to hasten the evacuation of Savoyard strongholds by French troops. Emmanuel Philibert also benefited from the advice of Michel de l'Hospital, formerly attached to the French court as chancellor to the princess.

The duke developed a port at Villefranche-sur-Mer (the Darse), fortifying it with the fort of Montalban and the Saint-Elmo Citadel. The first arsenal was established, and an initial fleet was launched. From four galleys in 1560, the number increased to ten; however, the cost of maintaining such a navy meant that only three galleys were operational. The Savoyard fleet, commanded by Admiral André Provana de Leyni, took part in the Battle of Lepanto (1571), contributing to the victory over the Ottoman forces.

Initially favored by fortune, Emmanuel Philibert was supported by experienced jurists such as Louis Milliet, vice-president and later president of the Senate of Savoy, and Emmanuel-Philibert de Pingon, former president of the Council of Genevois, whom he appointed councillor, historiographer, and reformer of studies at the University of Turin. The duke applied all his qualities as a statesman—shrewd, authoritative, and energetic—to the service of his country. Censuses were conducted, enabling the levying of a capitation tax and improving the state's finances. The Church retained a privileged position: Jesuits were established in Chambéry, which lost its role as capital in 1563, as the French invasion had convinced Emmanuel Philibert of the need to move the capital across the Alps to Turin. As noted by Jacques Lovie, despite the restoration of the state, which could give an impression of prosperity, and the maintenance of peace, Savoy remained a poor region, where villages contained “a majority of destitute people,” leading to continuous emigration, particularly to Switzerland and the Rhineland

On 8 August 1562, Emmanuel Philibert signed the Treaty of Blois with France, which restored all of Piedmont except the fortress of Pinerolo.

==== 12 December 1562: Transfer of the capital from Chambéry to Turin ====
On 12 December 1562, Duke Emmanuel Philibert of Savoy made a ceremonial entry into Turin at the head of a troop of six hundred nobles and men-at-arms bearing Savoyard banners described as gules with a cross argent. In the citadel square, he announced that Turin would henceforth be his capital, replacing Chambéry.

Historians consider that Chambéry and the duchy thereafter declined as an “outlying possession increasingly tightly controlled by officials.” Although Savoyards complained about the often intrusive oversight of Piedmontese officials, the duchy retained a degree of autonomy. Emmanuel Philibert had promulgated the edict of 11 February 1560, establishing in Chambéry the Sovereign Senate of Savoy. Its successive presidents, all natives of Savoy, were able to govern the duchy in the name of their sovereign independently of Piedmontese institutions.

Furthermore, on 22 September 1561, through the Edict of Rivoli, the duke affirmed his desire to preserve the use of the French language in his ancestral lands. Latin was replaced by French in official acts in the Duchy of Savoy, while Italian prevailed in Piedmontese administration. The Savoyard population thus retained its distinct identity through the use of French, alongside regional dialects. As Arnold van Gennep observed, there was no separation between rulers and the people in Savoy, and both elites and commoners used both French and local dialects.

The Armorial et nobiliaire de Savoie by Count Amédée de Foras details the fate of Savoyard noble families, many of whose members joined the ducal court in Turin as administrators or military officers.

==== Recovery of the duchy's territories ====
The Treaty of Lausanne, signed on 30 October 1564, enabled the recovery of the bailiwicks of Thonon, Gex, and Ternier-Gaillard, which had been occupied by the Bernese since 1536. In return, Emmanuel Philibert renounced sovereignty over Geneva and the Pays de Vaud, as well as the four Mandements of Aigle (Aigle, Ollon, Bex, Les Ormonts).

By the Treaty of Thonon, signed on 4 March 1569, Emmanuel Philibert settled the question of territories conquered by Valais in 1536: Évian, the Pays de Gavot, and Saint-Jean-d'Aulps were returned to Savoy, while the Seven Tithings retained the territories east of the Morge, corresponding to present-day Lower Valais.

== New period of unrest (1580–1630) ==
=== The reign of Charles Emmanuel I of Savoy (1580–1630) ===
Duke Charles Emmanuel I succeeded his father, Emmanuel Philibert, who died on 30 August 1580 in Turin.

Charles Emmanuel I, known as the Great, was as adventurous as his father had been prudent. Seeking to take advantage of the weakening of France during the French Wars of Religion, he conquered the Marquisate of Saluzzo, to later reconquer Geneva, the Pays de Vaud, the Dauphiné, and Provence. During this period, major fortification works were undertaken throughout Savoy (Fort de l’Annonciade at Rumilly, the Fortress of Montmélian, and citadels in the Avant-Pays Savoyard) to better defend Alpine passes away from Turin. However, Charles Emmanuel's ambitions failed, and Savoy was invaded by various foreign troops: Bernese, Valaisans, and French Protestants in Chablais, French forces in the Grésivaudan, as well as mercenaries nominally in his service but living off the land.

==== The Franco-Savoyard War (1600) and the Treaty of Lyon (1601) ====
On 14 August 1600, Henry IV declared the war on Savoy. Under the command of Marshal de Biron, the future Constable of France Lesdiguières led French troops into Savoy. While the former seized Bourg-en-Bresse and Pont-d'Ain, the latter captured the town of Montmélian, after which Sully besieged the citadel. The town of Chambéry was also besieged along with Conflans, which was dismantled; archives were burned, and various castles and churches were looted.

Sully and Henry IV personally intervened and forced Charles Emmanuel to sign the Treaty of Lyon on 17 January 1601. The duke paid 300 000 pounds to cover war expenses and retained the Marquisate of Saluzzo. Henry IV returned the conquered territories in Savoy but kept the seized artillery and equipment.

The Kingdom of France definitively annexed Bresse, Bugey, the County of Gex, Valromey, and the entire course of the Rhône from its exit from Geneva.

This exchange, made by the Duke of Savoy to recover Saluzzo, caused deep resentment among the Savoyards. Deprived of its provinces, Savoy was reduced to a mere dependency of Piedmont. The duke was mocked for "having traded his Bressan knights for half as many Piedmontese peasants". Many nobles and wealthy landowners from these provinces left Chambéry to adopt French nationality. The city, which had 1,634 heads of household, was reduced to only 460.

==== The Escalade of Geneva (1602) ====
Persisting in his intention to reduce what he called a "caterpillar nest", Duke Charles Emmanuel I launched an assault on Geneva on the night of 11–12 December 1602, leading an army of 4000 soldiers, largely composed of Piedmontese troops and Spanish mercenaries. The attempt ended in a humiliating failure, known as L'Escalade. This event is still commemorated annually in Geneva.

The Treaty of Saint-Julien ratified on 21 July 1603, under pressure from France, was welcomed enthusiastically by both Genevans and Savoyards.

==== Savoy ravaged by plague and invasion by Louis XIII (1630) ====
Following the signing of the Treaty of Saint-Julien on 21 July 1603, Duke Charles Emmanuel I took part in a series of local conflicts in Italy and pursued a shifting policy of alignment between France and Spain. On 25 April 1610, he signed the Treaty of Bruzolo together with the Duke of Lesdiguières, representing King Henry IV. The planned alliance between France and Savoy against Spain was cut short by the assassination of Henry IV less than a month later, on 14 May 1610.

Louis XIII succeeded his father at the age of eight, with his mother, Marie de' Medici, serving as regent of the Kingdom of France. She pursued a policy of dynastic alliances with Spain and appointed Richelieu as Secretary of State for War and Foreign Affairs. However, the coup d'état of 24 April 1617 allowed the young Louis XIII to assume direct power, with the support of Cardinal Richelieu.

On 21 July 1615, Duke Charles Emmanuel I ratified the Treaty of Asti. This treaty temporarily suspended the military campaign he had undertaken in an unsuccessful attempt to claim the succession to the Duchy of Montferrat. By agreement with France, the arbitration of the conflict was entrusted to Spain.

The Duke of Savoy subsequently became involved in nearly all conflicts in Piedmont, Italy, and Savoy. True to his policy of shifting alliances, he alternately allied with or opposed the Spanish, the Huguenots, and the French. While his borders were preserved, his finances were severely depleted.

In 1627, France settled the Montferrat dispute in favor of the Duke of Nevers, against the interests of the Duke of Savoy. Allied with the Protestant Grisons leagues, the forces of King Louis XIII controlled the Valtellina valley. In the following War of the Mantuan Succession, the French army invaded the Pass of Susa in April 1629. At the same time, the plague ravaged the states of Savoy, causing numerous deaths.

After prolonged negotiations with Richelieu's envoys over the maintenance of the Treaty of Susa, which had established a truce between the belligerents, the duke decided to break his alliance with France and side with Spain. Louis XIII reacted immediately: at the head of a large army led by three of his best commanders, he invaded Savoy and entered Chambéry in triumph on 17 May 1630. Duke Charles Emmanuel I, by then elderly and probably stricken by the plague, died in the midst of the campaign on 26 July 1630 at Savigliano, leaving his son, Victor Amadeus I, a disastrous inheritance.

During this long reign of fifty years, Savoy had been unable to recover, caught in the wake of its ruler's military and diplomatic ambitions. Repeatedly crossed by both enemy and allied troops, the country was plundered, and the expenses incurred by Charles Emmanuel I had brought it to ruin. His death came at a timely moment, allowing his successor to begin restoring order and peace.

== Reformation and Counter-Reformation ==
Like the rest of Europe, Savoy was affected from the 16th century by the major religious movements of the Protestant Reformation and the Catholic Counter-Reformation. Geneva, which had been part of Savoy at the beginning of the century, adopted the Reformation, and in 1541, John Calvin established a theocratic state there. Catholics had already left the city in 1535, and the bishopric of Geneva was transferred to Annecy. Following the Bernese invasion of the Chablais in 1536, the province was drawn into the Reformed camp.

In Savoy, the Counter-Reformation was embodied by Francis de Sales, who was later canonized. He played a central role in the Catholic reconquest of the Chablais from 1594 onward and also helped to revitalize a Church that had fallen into decline. The diocese of Geneva-Annecy was thoroughly reorganized: the population was actively preached to, and local elites were encouraged toward a renewed level of religious commitment. In this way, he led a determined Counter-Reformation effort in response to what was sometimes called the “New Rome” of Geneva. Strengthened in this period, Catholicism remained a key component of Savoyard identity.

== Savoy in the 17th and 18th centuries ==
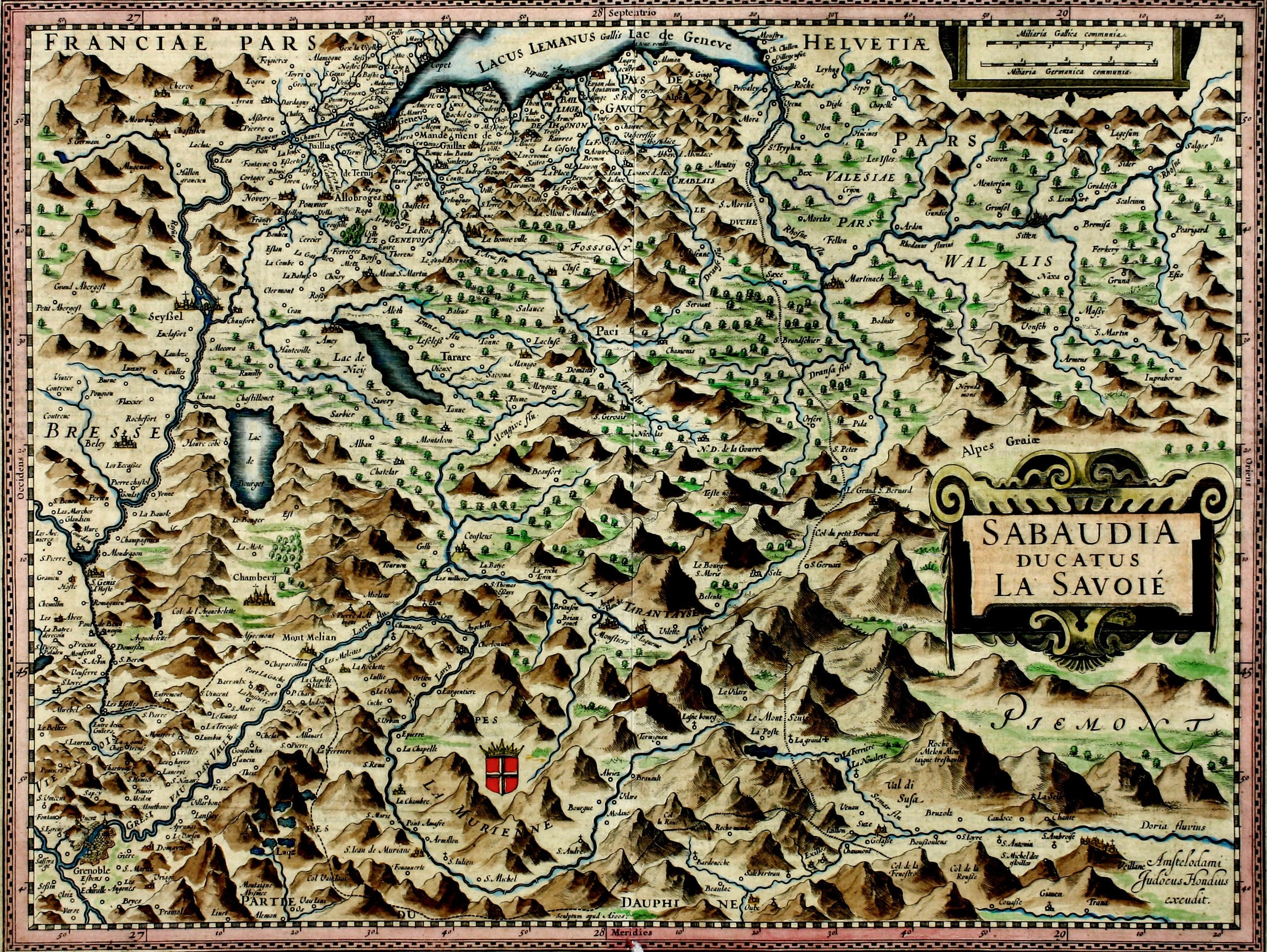
Map of the Duchy of Savoy in 1631.

=== A period of calm ===
From 1631, following the Treaty of Cherasco, Savoy entered a period of relative peace, although this stability existed under the growing influence of France. Louis XIV effectively treated the Duchy of Savoy–Piedmont as a vassal state. Despite this renewed peace, the country remained poor and did not experience significant prosperity. Part of the population was forced to emigrate, particularly from mountainous regions such as Faucigny.

Destinations for these migrants included Germany, Geneva, Valais, the Pays de Vaud, Franche-Comté, Lorraine, Burgundy, and Flanders. Lyon and Piedmont also attracted migrants, especially from the valleys of Tarentaise and Maurienne.

At the same time, the general level of education improved. By the end of the century, most inhabitants of Tarentaise were able to read and write. In the interior valleys, both wealthy families and emigrants who had accumulated some wealth contributed to the establishment of schools.

=== Reign of Victor Amadeus I (1630–1637) ===
Victor Amadeus I, Duke of Savoy, born in 1587, succeeded his father, Charles Emmanuel I, in 1630, following the latter's death on 26 July 1630 in Savigliano.

Upon taking power, he found his country in a state of crisis: the armies of Louis XIII had invaded Savoy, his father had just died suddenly, and the plague was devastating the region. Faced with this situation, Victor Amadeus I, advised by Cardinal Mazarin, ratified the Treaty of Cherasco on 6 April 1631 and renounced claims to the Duchy of Montferrat. He was also forced to cede Pinerolo to France. In return, he secured the withdrawal of foreign troops and the liberation of his territories.

Victor Amadeus I initially sought to maintain strict neutrality, but in 1635 Richelieu pressed him to side openly with France. On 11 July 1635, the duke ratified the Treaty of Rivoli, forming an alliance against Spain that brought together France and the duchies of Savoy, Parma, Modena, and Mantua. The Duke of Savoy then advanced into Lombardy alongside French forces, but he died suddenly in Vercelli in 1637.

=== The regency of Christine of France (1637–1638) ===
The young Duke Francis Hyacinth of Savoy, born in 1632, succeeded his father, Victor Amadeus I, in 1637 at the age of five, following his death on 7 October 1637 in Vercelli.

The regency of the States of Savoy was assumed by his mother, Christine of France, Duchess of Savoy, in opposition to her two brothers-in-law, Prince Thomas of Savoy-Carignan and Maurice of Savoy, who also claimed the position but were unsuccessful. As the sister of Louis XIII, she secured his support against courtiers surrounding Prince Francis Hyacinth, who were favorable to Spain. The young Francis Hyacinth died in Turin on 4 October 1638.

=== The reign of Duke Charles Emmanuel II of Savoy (1638–1675) ===
Charles Emmanuel II, Duke of Savoy, born in 1634, succeeded his brother Francis Hyacinth of Savoy in 1638 at the age of four, following the latter's death at the age of six on 4 October 1638 in Turin.

His mother, Christine of France, sister of King Louis XIII, served as regent of the States of Savoy until 1648. At her son's request, she continued to govern the country until she died in 1663. Thereafter, Charles Emmanuel II ruled his states under the political influence of Louis XIV.

In 1665, Charles Emmanuel II remarried Marie Jeanne Baptiste of Savoy-Nemours, a descendant of a cadet branch of the House of Savoy and the last heiress of the Duchy of Genevois. Through this alliance, he secured the reintegration of the Duchy of Genevois, along with its capital Annecy, into the Duchy of Savoy.

=== Reign of Victor Amadeus II (1675–1730) ===
Victor Amadeus II, Duke of Savoy, born in 1666, succeeded his father, Charles Emmanuel II of Savoy, in 1675 at the age of nine, following the latter's death on 12 June 1675 in Turin. During his minority, and until 1684, the regency of the States of Savoy was exercised by his mother, Marie Jeanne Baptiste of Savoy-Nemours.

Territorial expansion

Duke Victor Amadeus II demonstrated considerable diplomatic skill by joining the League of Augsburg, aligning himself with the Holy Roman Empire, and later reversing his alliance in favour of the France of Louis XIV. These shifts ultimately resulted in significant territorial expansion.

As a signatory of the Treaty of Utrecht, Victor Amadeus II secured in 1713 the liberation of the States of Savoy, which were subsequently evacuated by the armies of Louis XIV. Several territories were restored to his rule, including parts of the Duchy of Milan, Montferrat, Alessandria, and Valenza. In the same year, he was also granted the Kingdom of Sicily (in exchange for financial compensation), allowing him to assume a royal title long sought by the House of Savoy.

In 1720, Victor Amadeus II, then King of Sicily, exchanged the island with Emperor Charles VI of Austria for the island of Sardinia. As Sardinia held the status of a kingdom, he thereafter adopted the title of “King of Sardinia.”

Memorandum on the reintegration of the Duchy of Genevois into the States of Savoy

Prior to the Treaty of Utrecht, a significant territorial development—often overlooked—was the return of the Duchy of Genevois and its capital, Annecy, to the Duchy of Savoy in 1659, a reintegration confirmed in 1665, one year before the birth of Duke Victor Amadeus II.

The Genevois had originally been granted as an appanage in 1514 to the Savoy-Genevois branch, which later became the Savoy-Nemours line. Over time, although the Duke of Savoy nominally retained authority over the Duchy of Genevois, the territory increasingly escaped his control. It occasionally pursued political alliances contrary to those of Savoy, raising the risk of secession.

Following the death of the last Duke of Savoy-Nemours, Henry II, in 1659, the President of the Senate of Savoy, Jean-Louis Milliet, Marquis of Challes, traveled to Annecy. At the Palais de l’Île, where justice was administered, he proclaimed the territories of Genevois, Faucigny, and Beaufort reunited with the domain of Savoy. He abolished the existing judicial and financial councils and appointed interim officials.

Marie Jeanne Baptiste of Savoy-Nemours, mother of Victor Amadeus II and heir to the Duchy of Genevois through her uncle Henry II, later confirmed this reunification through her marriage in 1665 to Duke Charles Emmanuel II of Savoy. This reunification represents an event of major historical significance.

A time of warfare

The military dimension of the reign of Duke Victor Amadeus II of Savoy cannot be overlooked. Having sided with the Holy Roman Empire, the States of Savoy were invaded and occupied by French troops. Notable setbacks included the fall of the fortress of Montmélian in Savoy in 1691 and the capture of Nice, whose walls and fortress were completely dismantled.

In return, Victor Amadeus II benefited from the strong support of his cousin, Prince Eugene of Savoy, commander-in-chief of the imperial armies. Fighting of varying intensity took place across the occupied territories, with even brief incursions into Dauphiné and Provence. A key event of the period was the successful resistance of the Duke of Savoy during the siege of Turin in 1706 by French forces. During this siege, the Piedmontese soldier-miner Pietro Micca distinguished himself and was later celebrated throughout Italy as a national hero.

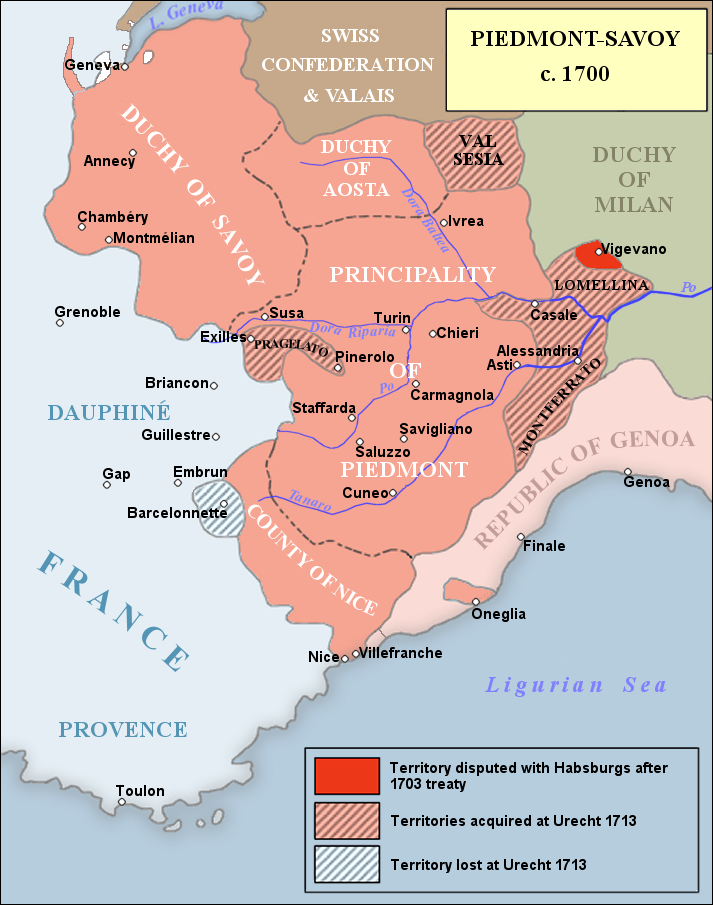
Duchy of Savoy in 1700.

Victor Amadeus II, Duke of Savoy, Prince of Piedmont, and King of Sardinia, abdicated in 1730 in favor of his son, Charles Emmanuel.

=== The reign of King Charles Emmanuel III of Sardinia (1730–1772) ===
Charles Emmanuel III, King of Sardinia (1701–1772), succeeded his father, Victor Amadeus II, in 1730, following his abdication on 3 September 1730. During his reign, he faced two major conflicts: the War of the Polish Succession and the War of the Austrian Succession.

The Spanish occupation of Savoy (1742–1749)

Having aligned himself with Austria in 1741, Charles Emmanuel III exposed Savoy to a Spanish offensive in 1742, which led to its occupation until the end of the War of the Austrian Succession. During this period, Spain was represented in Chambéry by the Infante Philip, who departed in December 1748 after the Treaty of Aix-la-Chapelle; the last Spanish troops withdrew from Savoy in February 1749.

==== The Treaty of Turin (1760) ====
The Treaty of Turin, signed on 24 March 1760 between France and the Kingdom of Sardinia, established the borders between the territories of Savoy, Nice, and Piedmont, and those of the Kingdom of France. The surveys and plans were carried out by Pierre Joseph de Bourcet, Director of Fortifications in Dauphiné, on behalf of King Louis XV.

==== The Royal Constitutions and the modernization of the kingdom ====
The government of Charles Emmanuel III was based on a strict form of absolutism, though it was largely administered by his ministers, notably the Marquis of Orméa until 1745 and later Bogino. Major reforms were implemented in continuity with the Statuta Sabaudiae issued by Duke Amadeus VIII in 1430. The Royal Constitutions, first enacted in 1723, played a key role in modernizing the kingdom.

Charles Emmanuel III introduced further reforms to strengthen the state. He established a standing army of 30,000 men, reducing reliance on the feudal nobility, and expanded the powers of royal officials at the expense of local communities.

In an effort to create a fairer and more efficient tax system, he launched in 1728 the vast project of the Mappe sarde, a detailed cadastral survey drawn at a scale of 1:2400. During this period, Jean-Jacques Rousseau, while passing through Chambéry, earned his living working for the cadastral administration. In 1746, paper currency was introduced. Finally, the edict of 15 February 1755 standardized the relationship between gold and silver currencies by defining their composition and weight throughout the kingdom.

In 1770, Charles Emmanuel III promulgated a revised version of the Royal Constitutions of 1723, prepared by Jacques Salteur and François-Xavier Maistre, respectively first and second presidents of the Senate of Savoy. The modernization of the Kingdom of Sardinia was further advanced by the abolition—accompanied by compensation—of feudal rights, initiated in 1778 by his successor, Victor Amadeus III. In this respect, the kingdom preceded the abolition of feudal privileges enacted in France by seven years, during the Night of 4 August 1789.

==== Economic conditions and development in the 18th century ====
Savoyard society was composed of approximately 90% peasants, for whom life remained harsh and could at times become catastrophic, as in 1709 during the French occupation of 1703–1713. The terrible “Great Winter” of 1709 led the senators of Chambéry to draft a memorandum warning of the “complete and imminent ruin” of the province. Despite this постоян exposure to climatic hazards and foreign occupations, a form of village democracy developed. On Sundays, after Mass, men regularly gathered in the marketplace for a general assembly announced from the pulpit by the parish priest. A notary was present, as well as the châtelain representing the lord or duke, but the assembly was presided over by elected syndics. The matters discussed included the maintenance of communal property—mills, fountains, ovens, presses—the hiring of rural guards, and the level of communal taxes.

In the Avant-pays of Annecy, communal lands represented 11.4% of the total area; in more mountainous regions, such as the Bauges or the Thônes valley, this proportion reached 43%. It was even higher in Tarentaise and Maurienne.Villages were often wealthier in mountainous areas, partly due to traditions of migration, in contrast to the region around Chambéry, where tenancy benefiting the nobility and bourgeoisie predominated.

Among the ruling classes, the 18th century saw both a renewal and a consolidation of social structures. On the one hand, the nobility was replenished through the ennoblement of the upper bourgeoisie—magistrates and syndics; on the other hand, it became more rigid. In Savoy, the bourgeoisie referred not to industrialists but to a class of legal professionals (robins), particularly numerous notaries, who had participated in the purchase of seigneurial rights when they were put up for sale from 1770 onward. As a result of an elitist reflex, the nobility resented them, preventing any real rapprochement between the two privileged classes, even as their rights and economic positions became increasingly similar. The expansion of the nobility remained limited, as the king retained control over its composition. The formal loss of privileges did not exclude their symbolic persistence.

=== The reign of Victor Amadeus III (1773–1796) and the French Revolution ===
Victor Amadeus III, King of Sardinia (1726–1796), succeeded his father, Charles Emmanuel III, in 1773 following his death on 20 February of that year in Turin. Upon his accession, he pursued a program of reform inspired in part by Frederick II of Prussia, whom he admired.

Victor Amadeus III strongly opposed the French Revolution, which began in 1789. Closely linked to the French monarchy—two of his children had married siblings of Louis XVI—he welcomed French émigrés into his territories and refused to recognize the French Republic.

In September 1792, the Duchy of Savoy, along with the County of Nice, was invaded and annexed by Revolutionary France.
