= Armoy, Haute-Savoie =

Armoy Armoué (Savoyard)
- Commune
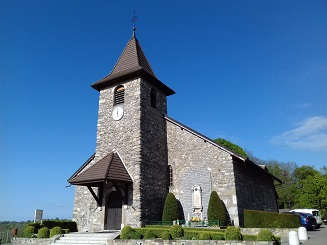
- Saint-Pierre d'Armoy church
- Location of Armoy
- Location within France Location within Auvergne-Rhône-Alpes
- Coordinates: 46°20′57″N 6°31′14″E
- Country: France
- Region: Auvergne-Rhône-Alpes
- Department: Haute-Savoie
- Arrondissement: Thonon-les-Bains
- Canton: Thonon-les-Bains
- Intercommunality: Thonon Agglomération

Government
  - Mayor (2020–2026): Patrick Bernard
- Area^{1}: 4.95 km^{2} (1.91 sq mi)
- Highest elevation: 674 m (2,211 ft)
- Lowest elevation: 415 m (1,362 ft)
- Population (2023): 1,564
  - Density: 316/km^{2} (818/sq mi)
- Demonym: Armoisiens / Armoisiennes
- Time zone: UTC+01:00 (CET)
  - Summer (DST): UTC+02:00 (CEST)
- INSEE/Postal code: 74020 /74200
- ^{1} French Land Register data, which excludes lakes, ponds, glaciers > 1 km^{2} (0.386 sq mi or 247 acres) and river estuaries.

Armoy (French pronunciation: [aʁmwa]; Savoyard: Armoué) is a commune in the Haute-Savoie department and Auvergne-Rhône-Alpes region of eastern France.

The commune covers an area of 4.95 square kilometres and lies between 415 and 674 metres above sea level. The inhabitants, of whom there were 1,287 in 2018, are known as Armoisiens.

== See also ==
- Communes of the Haute-Savoie department
