= Draillant =

- Commune
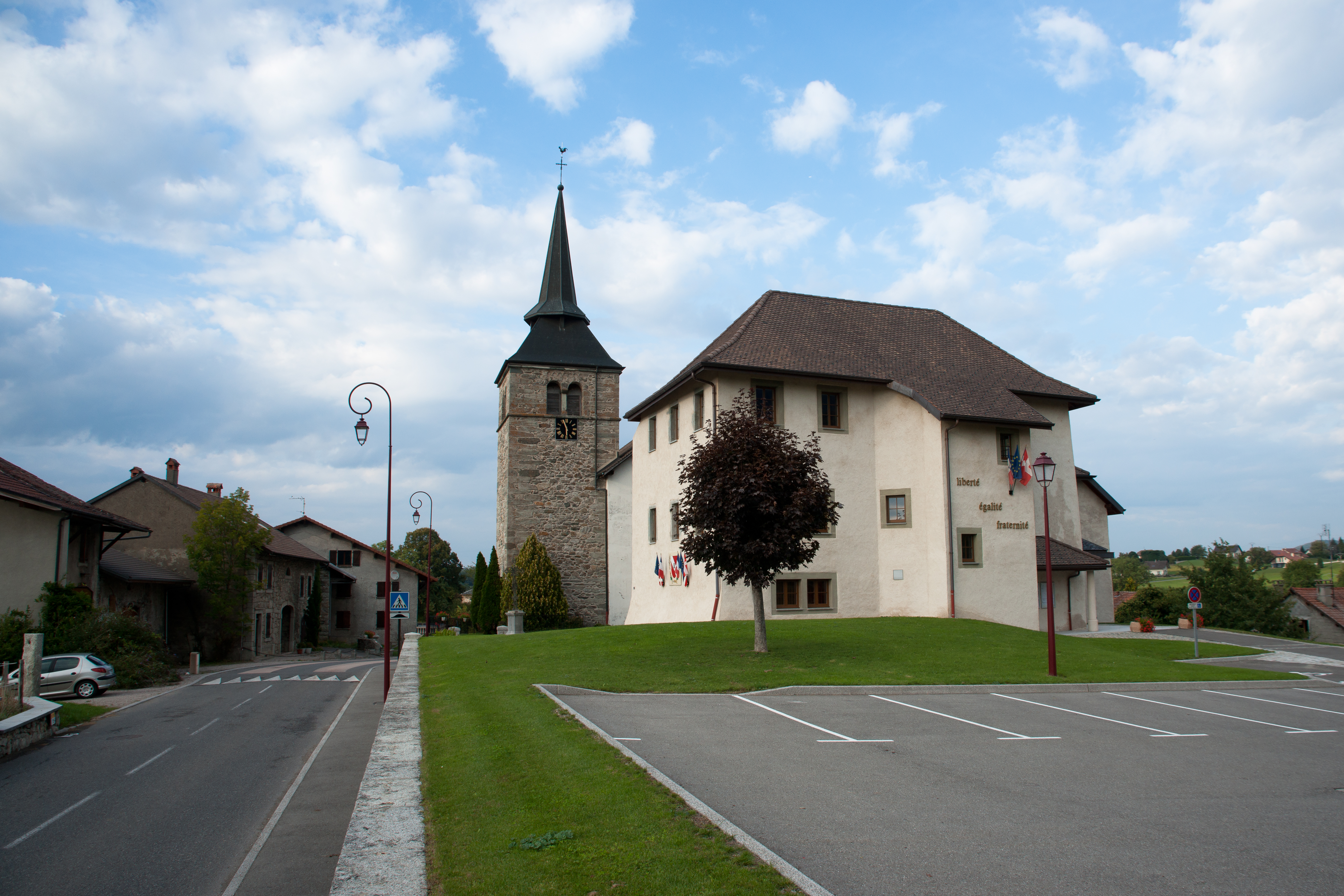
- Church and town hall of Draillant

- Coat of arms
- Location of Draillant
- Location within France Location within Auvergne-Rhône-Alpes
- Coordinates: 46°18′20″N 6°27′30″E
- Country: France
- Region: Auvergne-Rhône-Alpes
- Department: Haute-Savoie
- Arrondissement: Thonon-les-Bains
- Canton: Thonon-les-Bains
- Intercommunality: Thonon Agglomération

Government
  - Mayor (2020–2026): Pascal Genoud
- Area^{1}: 10.41 km^{2} (4.02 sq mi)
- Highest elevation: 1,518 m (4,980 ft)
- Lowest elevation: 567 m (1,860 ft)
- Population (2023): 872
  - Density: 83.8/km^{2} (217/sq mi)
- Time zone: UTC+01:00 (CET)
  - Summer (DST): UTC+02:00 (CEST)
- INSEE/Postal code: 74106 /74550
- ^{1} French Land Register data, which excludes lakes, ponds, glaciers > 1 km^{2} (0.386 sq mi or 247 acres) and river estuaries.

Draillant (French pronunciation: [dʁajɑ̃]; Arpitan: Dralyent) is a commune in the Haute-Savoie department in the Auvergne-Rhône-Alpes region in south-eastern France.

== See also ==
- Communes of the Haute-Savoie department
