= Nangy =

Nangy Nanzhi (Savoyard)
- Commune
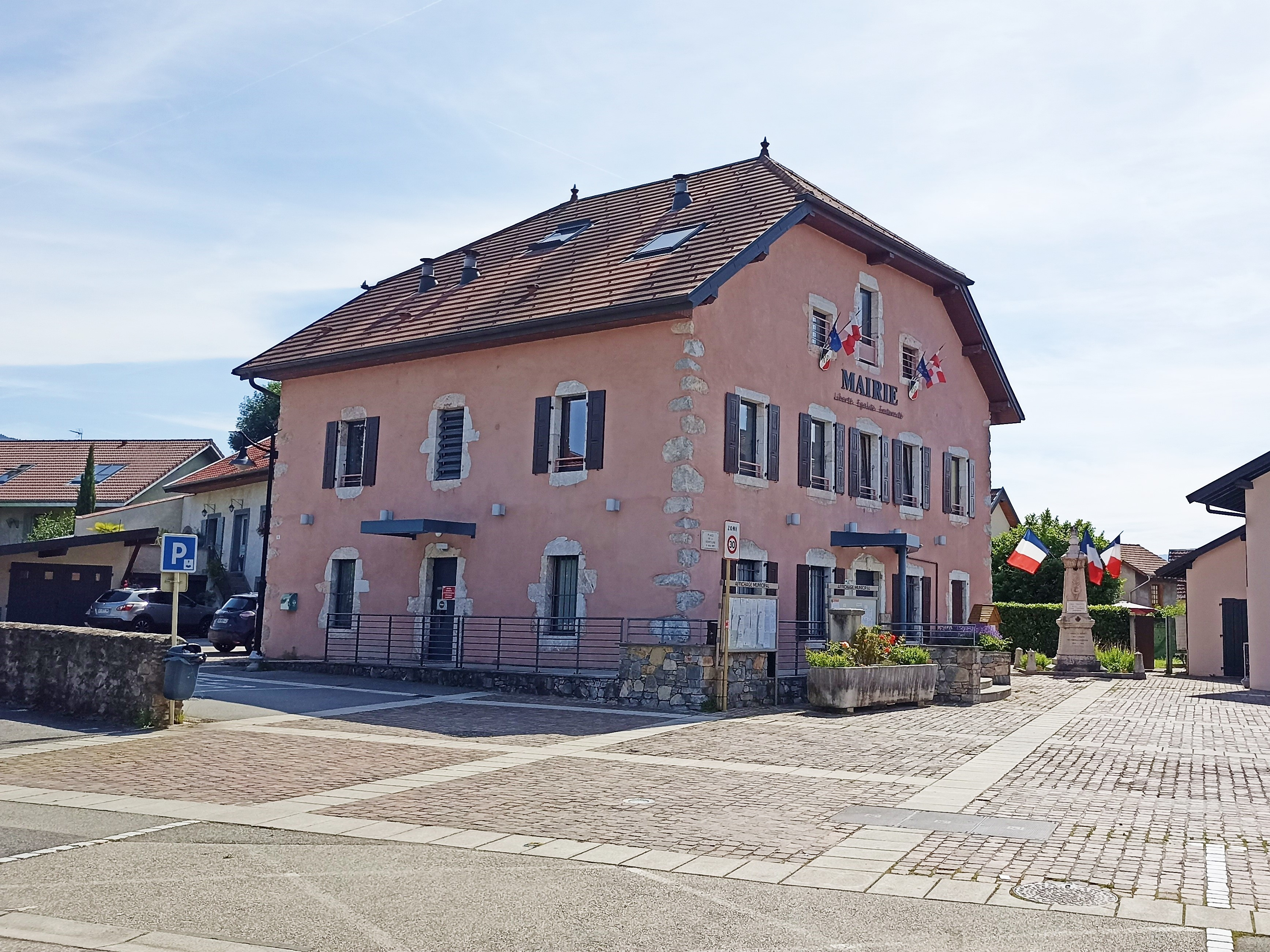
- Town hall of Nangy

- Coat of arms
- Location of Nangy
- Location within France Location within Auvergne-Rhône-Alpes
- Coordinates: 46°09′18″N 6°18′25″E
- Country: France
- Region: Auvergne-Rhône-Alpes
- Department: Haute-Savoie
- Arrondissement: Saint-Julien-en-Genevois
- Canton: La Roche-sur-Foron
- Intercommunality: CC Arve et Salève

Government
  - Mayor (2020–2026): Laurent Favre
- Area^{1}: 4.35 km^{2} (1.68 sq mi)
- Highest elevation: 530 m (1,740 ft)
- Lowest elevation: 415 m (1,362 ft)
- Population (2023): 1,771
  - Density: 407/km^{2} (1,050/sq mi)
- Time zone: UTC+01:00 (CET)
  - Summer (DST): UTC+02:00 (CEST)
- INSEE/Postal code: 74197 /74380
- ^{1} French Land Register data, which excludes lakes, ponds, glaciers > 1 km^{2} (0.386 sq mi or 247 acres) and river estuaries.

Nangy (French pronunciation: [nɑ̃ʒi]; Savoyard: Nanzhi) is a commune in the Haute-Savoie department in the Auvergne-Rhône-Alpes region in south-eastern France.

== See also ==
- Communes of the Haute-Savoie department
