= Bellevaux =

Bellevaux Balavô (Savoyard)
- Commune
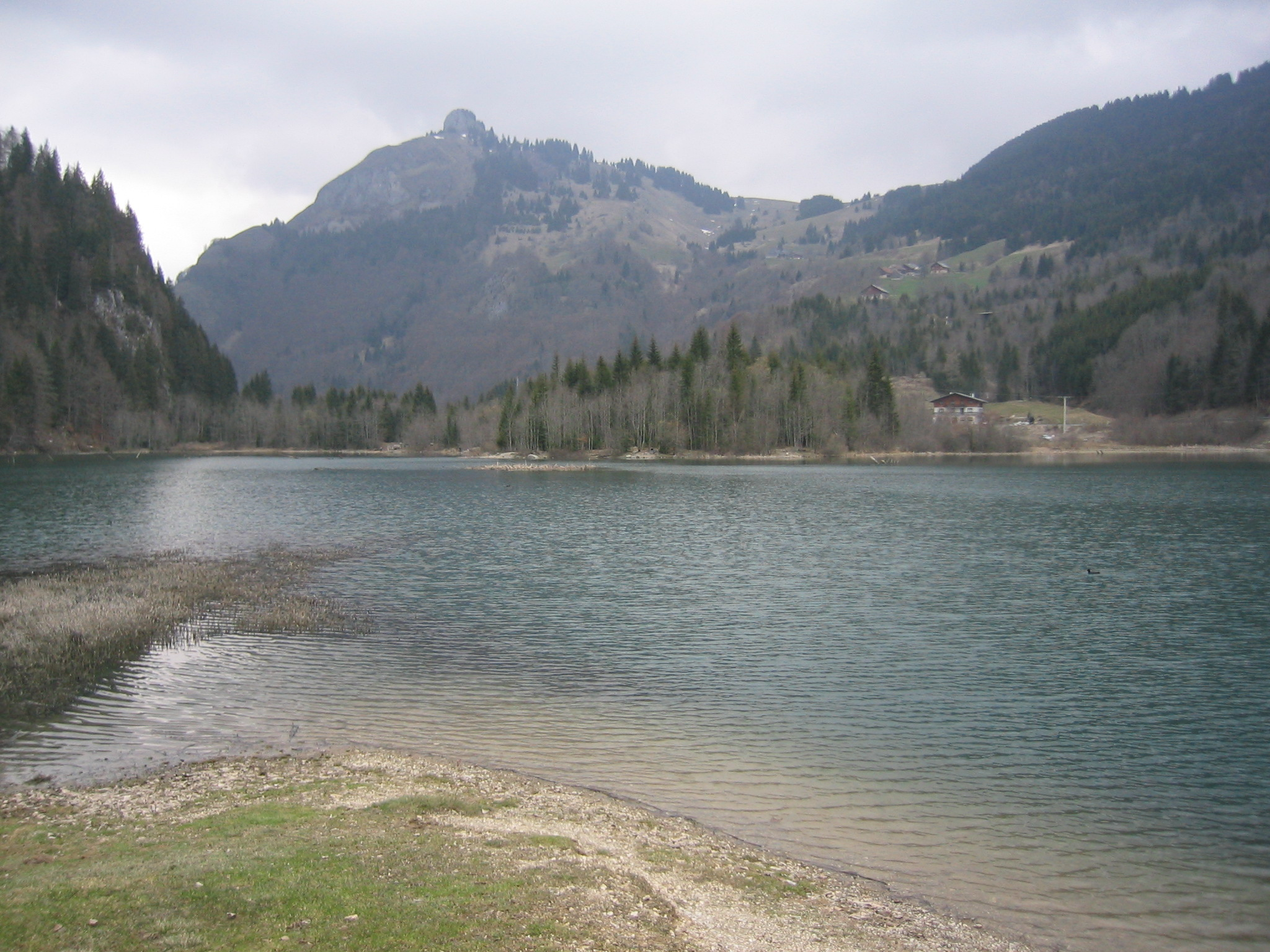
- View of Lac de Vallon towards Bellevaux

- Coat of arms
- Location of Bellevaux
- Location within France Location within Auvergne-Rhône-Alpes
- Coordinates: 46°15′27″N 6°31′55″E
- Country: France
- Region: Auvergne-Rhône-Alpes
- Department: Haute-Savoie
- Arrondissement: Thonon-les-Bains
- Canton: Thonon-les-Bains

Government
  - Mayor (2020–2026): Jean-Louis Vuagnoux
- Area^{1}: 48.97 km^{2} (18.91 sq mi)
- Highest elevation: 2,244 m (7,362 ft)
- Lowest elevation: 806 m (2,644 ft)
- Population (2023): 1,450
  - Density: 29.6/km^{2} (76.7/sq mi)
- Time zone: UTC+01:00 (CET)
  - Summer (DST): UTC+02:00 (CEST)
- INSEE/Postal code: 74032 /74470
- ^{1} French Land Register data, which excludes lakes, ponds, glaciers > 1 km^{2} (0.386 sq mi or 247 acres) and river estuaries.

Bellevaux (French pronunciation: [bɛlvo]; Savoyard: Balavô) is a commune in the Haute-Savoie department in the Auvergne-Rhône-Alpes region in south-eastern France.

== See also ==
- Communes of the Haute-Savoie department
