= Cornier =

Cornier Korni (Savoyard)
- Commune
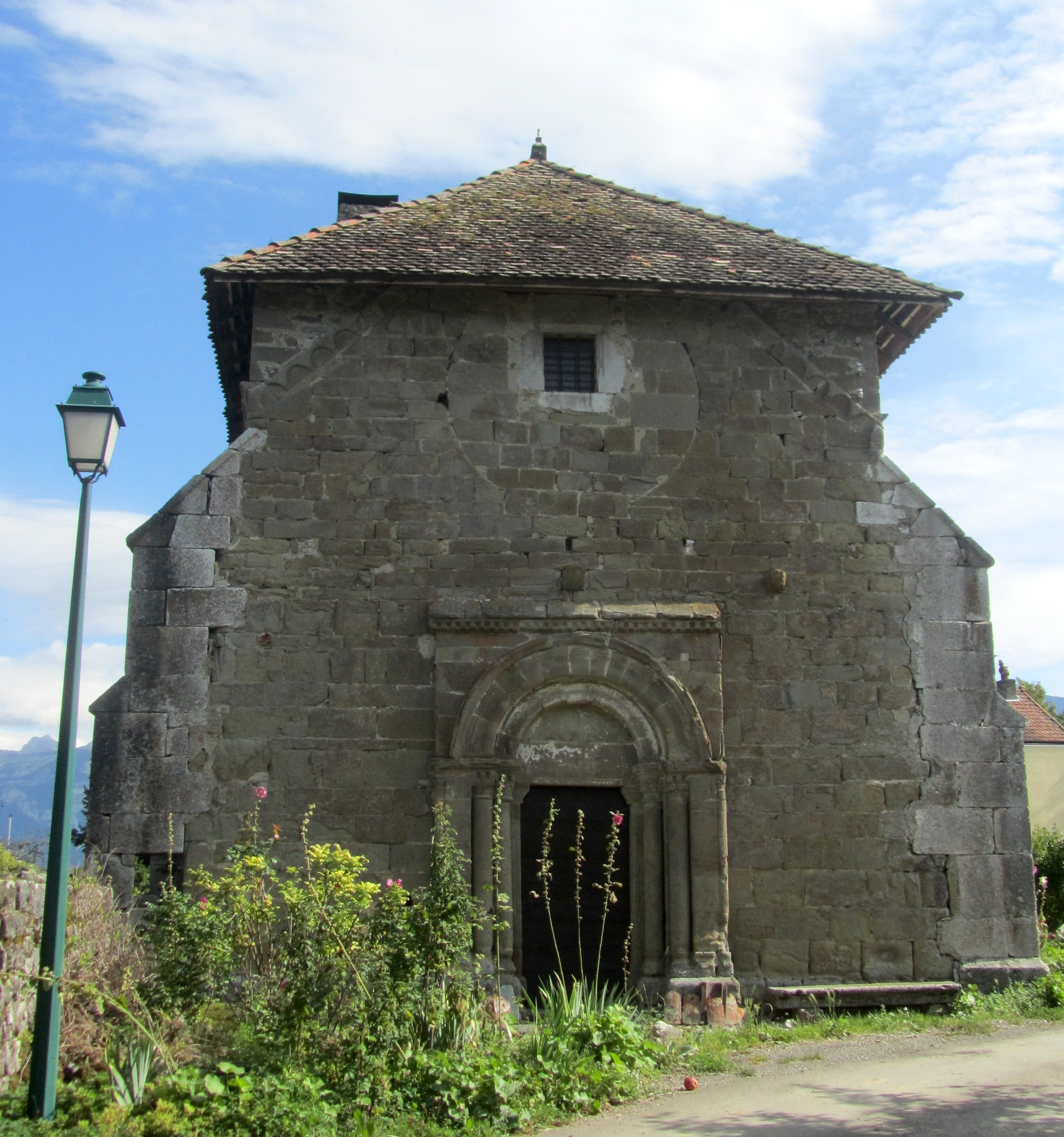
- The Chapel of Moussy, in Cornier

- Coat of arms
- Location of Cornier
- Location within France Location within Auvergne-Rhône-Alpes
- Coordinates: 46°05′37″N 6°18′02″E
- Country: France
- Region: Auvergne-Rhône-Alpes
- Department: Haute-Savoie
- Arrondissement: Bonneville
- Canton: La Roche-sur-Foron
- Intercommunality: CC du Pays Rochois

Government
  - Mayor (2020–2026): Michel Roux
- Area^{1}: 6.78 km^{2} (2.62 sq mi)
- Highest elevation: 912 m (2,992 ft)
- Lowest elevation: 453 m (1,486 ft)
- Population (2023): 1,507
  - Density: 222/km^{2} (576/sq mi)
- Time zone: UTC+01:00 (CET)
  - Summer (DST): UTC+02:00 (CEST)
- INSEE/Postal code: 74090 /74800
- Website: Mairie-cornier.com
- ^{1} French Land Register data, which excludes lakes, ponds, glaciers > 1 km^{2} (0.386 sq mi or 247 acres) and river estuaries.

Cornier (French pronunciation: [kɔʁnje]; Savoyard: Korni) is a commune in the Haute-Savoie department in the Auvergne-Rhône-Alpes region in south-eastern France.

== See also ==
- Communes of the Haute-Savoie department
