= 2023–24 RC Lens season =

RC Lens
2023–24 season
- President: Joseph Oughourlian
- Head coach: Franck Haise
- Stadium: Stade Bollaert-Delelis
- Ligue 1: 7th
- Coupe de France: Round of 64
- UEFA Champions League: Group stage
- UEFA Europa League: Knockout round play-offs
- Top goalscorer: League: Elye Wahi (9); All: Elye Wahi (12)
- Average home league attendance: 37,824
Home colours	Away colours	Third colours

The 2023–24 season was Racing Club de Lens' 117th season in existence and fourth consecutive season in Ligue 1. They also competed in the Coupe de France, the UEFA Champions League and the UEFA Europa League.

== Players ==
=== First-team squad ===
As of 1 February 2024

Note: Flags indicate national team as defined under FIFA eligibility rules; some limited exceptions apply. Players may hold more than one non-FIFA nationality.

No.	Pos.	Nation	Player
2	DF	FRA	Ruben Aguilar
3	DF	COL	Deiver Machado
4	DF	AUT	Kevin Danso
6	MF	GHA	Salis Abdul Samed
7	FW	FRA	Florian Sotoca
9	FW	FRA	Elye Wahi
10	MF	POR	David Costa
11	MF	FRA	Angelo Fulgini
13	DF	ECU	Jhoanner Chávez (on loan from Bahia)
14	DF	ARG	Facundo Medina
16	GK	FRA	Jean-Louis Leca
18	MF	FRA	Andy Diouf
19	MF	FRA	Jimmy Cabot

No.	Pos.	Nation	Player
21	DF	MLI	Massadio Haïdara
22	FW	FRA	Wesley Saïd
23	MF	MAR	Neil El Aynaoui
24	DF	FRA	Jonathan Gradit
25	DF	UZB	Abdukodir Khusanov
26	MF	SEN	Nampalys Mendy
27	FW	GUI	Morgan Guilavogui
28	MF	FRA	Adrien Thomasson
29	MF	POL	Przemysław Frankowski
30	GK	FRA	Brice Samba (captain)
36	FW	FRA	Ibrahima Baldé
40	GK	COM	Yannick Pandor

=== Out on loan ===
Note: Flags indicate national team as defined under FIFA eligibility rules; some limited exceptions apply. Players may hold more than one non-FIFA nationality.

No.	Pos.	Nation	Player
5	MF	NED	Stijn Spierings (at Toulouse until 30 June 2024)
15	FW	COL	Óscar Cortés (at Rangers until 30 June 2024)
—	DF	FRA	Julien Le Cardinal (at Brest until 30 June 2024)
—	MF	GLP	Rémy Labeau (at Laval until 30 June 2024)

No.	Pos.	Nation	Player
—	MF	POL	Łukasz Poręba (at Hamburger SV until 30 June 2024)
—	MF	MLI	Mamadou Camara (at Nancy until 30 June 2024)
—	FW	POL	Adam Buksa (at Antalyaspor until 30 June 2024)

== Transfers ==
=== In ===
Pos.	Player	Transferred from	Fee	Date	Source
MF	(Morocco) Neil El Aynaoui	(France) Nancy	€600,000	1 July 2023	
FW	(Guinea) Morgan Guilavogui	(France) Paris FC	€4,000,000	1 July 2023	
MF	(Netherlands) Stijn Spierings	(France) Toulouse	Free	1 July 2023	
MF	(France) Andy Diouf	(Switzerland) Basel	€15,000,000	2 July 2023	
MF	(Colombia) Óscar Cortés	(Colombia) Millonarios	€4,500,000	14 July 2023	
DF	(Uzbekistan) Abdukodir Khusanov	(Belarus) Energetik-BGU	Undisclosed	24 July 2023	
FW	(France) Elye Wahi	(France) Montpellier	€30,000,000	20 August 2023	
DF	(France) Ruben Aguilar	(France) Monaco	Undisclosed	1 September 2023	
DF	(France) Faitout Maouassa	(Belgium) Club Brugge	Loan	2 September 2023	
DF	(Ecuador) Jhoanner Chávez	(Brazil) Bahia	Loan	9 January 2024	

=== Out ===
Pos.	Player	Transferred to	Fee	Date	Source
FW	(Guadeloupe) Rémy Labeau	(France) Laval	Loan	1 July 2023	
DF	(Comoros) Ismaël Boura	(France) Troyes	Free	1 July 2023	
DF	(France) Adrien Louveau	(Poland) ŁKS Łódź	Free	13 July 2023	
FW	(Belgium) Loïs Openda	(Germany) RB Leipzig	€43,000,000	14 July 2023	
FW	(Poland) Adam Buksa	(Turkey) Antalyaspor	Loan	18 July 2023	
MF	(Ivory Coast) Seko Fofana	(Saudi Arabia) Al Nassr	€19,000,000	18 July 2023	
MF	(Cameroon) Jean Onana	(Turkey) Beşiktaş	€4,000,000	21 July 2023	
MF	(Poland) Łukasz Poręba	(Germany) Hamburger SV	Loan	30 August 2023	
DF	(France) Julien Le Cardinal	(France) Brest	Loan	1 September 2023	
MF	(Netherlands) Stijn Spierings	(France) Toulouse	Loan	14 September 2023	

== Pre-season and friendlies ==
Win Draw Loss Fixtures

8 July 2023 Friendly	Lens	4–4	Dunkerque	Avion
11:00 UTC+2	Sotoca 12'; Baldé (penalty missed) 46'; Tormin 52'; Sishuba 80' (pen.); El Aynaoui 89'	Report	Ghrieb 14'; Kondo 68'; Etonde 72' (pen.); Mbemba 75' (pen.)	Stadium: Stade François Blin

14 July 2023 Friendly	Lens	2–2	Amiens	Avion
16:00 UTC+2	Saïd 8'; Sotoca 73'		Kakuta 19', 37'	Stadium: Stade François Blin
Note: Four periods of 25 minutes.

22 July 2023 Friendly	Lens	3–0	Sochaux	Divonne-les-Bains
11:30 UTC+2	Sishuba 6', 18'; Thomasson 35'	Report		Stadium: Complexe sportif de Divonne-les-Bains

22 July 2023 Friendly	Lens	2–0	Dijon	Divonne-les-Bains
16:00 UTC+2	Fulgini 6'; Costa 75'	Report		Stadium: Complexe sportif de Divonne-les-Bains

29 July 2023 Friendly	VfL Wolfsburg	1–1	Lens	Wolfsburg, Germany
15:00 UTC+2	Baku 76'	Report	Machado 81'	Stadium: AOK Stadion

2 August 2023 Friendly	Lens	0–0	Torino	Lens
19:00 UTC+2				Stadium: Stade Bollaert-Delelis

5 August 2023 Friendly	Manchester United	3–1	Lens	Manchester, England
12:30 UTC+1	Rashford 48'; Antony 53'; Casemiro 58'	Report	Sotoca 23'	Stadium: Old Trafford; Attendance: 70,000

== Competitions ==
=== Overall record ===
Competition	First match	Last match	Starting round	Final position	Record							
Competition	First match	Last match	Starting round	Final position	Pld	W	D	L	GF	GA	GD	Win %
Ligue 1	13 August 2023	19 May 2024	Matchday 1	7th	34	14	9	11	45	37	+8	41.18
Coupe de France	7 January 2024		Round of 64	Round of 64	1	0	1	0	2	2	+0	0.00
UEFA Champions League	20 September 2023	12 December 2023	Group stage	Group stage	6	2	2	2	6	11	−5	33.33
UEFA Europa League	15 February 2024	22 February 2024	Knockout round play-offs	Knockout round play-offs	2	0	1	1	2	3	−1	0.00
Total					43	16	13	14	55	53	+2	37.21

Source: Soccerway

=== Ligue 1 ===
==== League table ====
Pos	Team	Pld	W	D	L	GF	GA	GD	Pts	Qualification or relegation
5	Nice	34	15	10	9	40	29	+11	55	Qualification for the Europa League league phase (Note: Since the 2023–24 Coupe de France winners, Paris Saint-Germain, qualified for the Champions League via league position, the Europa League berth awarded to the cup winners was passed to the sixth-placed team and the Conference League berth was passed to the seventh-placed team.)
6	Lyon	34	16	5	13	49	55	−6	53	Qualification for the Europa League league phase
7	Lens	34	14	9	11	45	37	+8	51	Qualification for the Conference League play-off round
8	Marseille	34	13	11	10	52	41	+11	50	
9	Reims	34	13	8	13	42	47	−5	47	

Source: Ligue 1
Rules for classification: 1) Points; 2) Goal difference; 3) Head-to-head points; 4) Head-to-head goal difference; 5) Head-to-head goals scored; 6) Head-to-head away goals scored; 7) Goals scored; 8) Away goals scored; 9) Fair-play points (Note: Head-to-head record is used only after all the matches between the teams in question have been played).

==== Results summary ====
Overall								Home						Away					
Pld	W	D	L	GF	GA	GD	Pts	W	D	L	GF	GA	GD	W	D	L	GF	GA	GD
34	14	9	11	45	37	+8	51	9	4	4	27	18	+9	5	5	7	18	19	−1

Source: Ligue 1

==== Results by round ====
Round	1	2	3	4	5	6	7	8	9	10	11	12	13	14	15	16	17	18	19	20	21	22	23	24	25	26	27	28	29	30	31	32	33	34
Ground	A	H	A	A	H	H	A	H	A	H	A	H	A	H	A	H	A	H	A	A	H	A	H	A	H	H	A	H	A	H	A	H	A	H
Result	L	D	L	L	L	W	W	D	D	W	D	W	W	W	D	W	L	L	W	W	W	D	L	W	W	L	L	D	L	W	L	W	D	D
Position	13	14	15	17	18	16	15	14	15	10	10	6	6	6	7	7	7	8	8	6	6	6	6	6	5	6	6	6	6	6	6	6	6	7

Source: Ligue 1
A = Away; H = Home; W = Win; D = Draw; L = Loss

==== Matches ====
The league fixtures were unveiled on 29 June 2023.

13 August 2023 1	Brest	3–2	Lens	Brest
13:00 CEST (UTC+2)	Lees-Melou (yellow card) 35'; Del Castillo 45+2' (pen.), 87' (pen.); Brassier (yellow card) 45+4'; Lala 56'	Report	Sotoca 11', (yellow card) 48'; Machado 22'; Medina (yellow card) 52'; Thomasson (yellow card) 82', (red card) 82'; Samba (yellow card) 85'	Stadium: Stade Francis-Le Blé; Attendance: 15,085; Referee: Jérémie Pignard

20 August 2023 2	Lens	1–1	Rennes	Lens
20:45 CEST (UTC+2)	Machado 3'; Abdul Samed (yellow card) 51'; Gradit (yellow card) 79'	Report	Bourigeaud 53' (pen.); Omari (yellow card) 57'	Stadium: Stade Bollaert-Delelis; Attendance: 37,233; Referee: Benoît Millot

26 August 2023 3	Paris Saint-Germain	3–1	Lens	Paris
20:45 CEST (UTC+2)	Asensio 45'; Mbappé 52', 90+1'	Report	Medina (yellow card) 20'; Sotoca (yellow card) 42'; Spierings (yellow card) 79'; Machado (yellow card) 82'; Gradit (yellow card) 87'; Guilavogui 90+5'	Stadium: Parc des Princes; Attendance: 47,864; Referee: François Letexier

2 September 2023 4	Monaco	3–0	Lens	Monaco
20:45 CEST (UTC+2)	Singo 24'; Magassa (yellow card) 33'; Golovin 36'; Camara (yellow card) 47'; Vanderson (yellow card) 52'; Maripán 59'; Balogun (yellow card) 78'	Report	Spierings (yellow card) 23'; Medina (yellow card) 64'	Stadium: Stade Louis II; Attendance: 9,402; Referee: Willy Delajod

16 September 2023 5	Lens	0–1	Metz	Lens
21:00 CEST (UTC+2)	Wahi (yellow card) 64'	Report	Asoro (yellow card) 33', (goal) 37'; Candé (yellow card) 64'	Stadium: Stade Bollaert-Delelis; Attendance: 37,988; Referee: Stéphanie Frappart

24 September 2023 6	Lens	2–1	Toulouse	Lens
15:00 CEST (UTC+2)	Saïd 45+2'; Gradit (yellow card) 54'; Wahi (yellow card) 75'; Guilavogui 84'	Report	Gelabert 33'; Dønnum (yellow card) 69'	Stadium: Stade Bollaert-Delelis; Attendance: 37,506; Referee: Hakim Ben El Hadj

29 September 2023 7	Strasbourg	0–1	Lens	Strasbourg
21:00 CEST (UTC+2)	Emegha (yellow card) 64'; Doukouré (yellow card) 69'	Report	Wahi 16'; Gradit (yellow card) 33'; Medina (yellow card) 45+3'; Mendy (yellow card) 54'; El Aynaoui (yellow card) 90+1'	Stadium: Stade de la Meinau; Attendance: 26,001; Referee: Jérôme Brisard

8 October 2023 8	Lens	1–1	Lille	Lens
17:05 CEST (UTC+2)	Medina (yellow card) 17'; Machado 70'; Wahi (yellow card) 82'	Report	Cavaleiro (yellow card) 20'; André 45+3'; Alexsandro (yellow card) 68'; Gomes (yellow card) 82'; Yoro (yellow card) 90'	Stadium: Stade Bollaert-Delelis; Attendance: 37,223; Referee: Benoît Millot

20 October 2023 9	Le Havre	0–0	Lens	Le Havre
21:00 CEST (UTC+2)	Sabbi (yellow card) 29'; Sangante (yellow card) 65'	Report	Diouf (yellow card) 12'; Danso (yellow card) 20'; Frankowski (yellow card) 34'	Stadium: Stade Océane; Attendance: 23,590; Referee: François Letexier

28 October 2023 10	Lens	4–0	Nantes	Lens
21:00 CEST (UTC+2)	Sotoca 27' (pen.), 72' (pen.); Medina 58'; Wahi (yellow card) 68'; El Aynaoui 89'	Report	Cömert (yellow card) 68'; Duverne (yellow card) 83'	Stadium: Stade Bollaert-Delelis; Attendance: 38,223; Referee: Pierre Gaillouste

4 November 2023 11	Lorient	0–0	Lens	Lorient
17:00 CET (UTC+1)	Mvuka (yellow card) 40'; Touré (yellow card) 90+4'	Report	Danso (yellow card) 48'; Samba (yellow card) 90+4'; Fulgini (yellow card) 90+4'	Stadium: Stade du Moustoir; Attendance: 16,599; Referee: Bastien Dechepy

12 November 2023 12	Lens	1–0	Marseille	Lens
20:45 CET (UTC+1)	Gradit (yellow card) 44', (goal) 90'; Abdul Samed (yellow card) 76'	Report	Lodi (yellow card) 37'; Vitinha (yellow card) 45+2'	Stadium: Stade Bollaert-Delelis; Attendance: 38,223; Referee: Benoît Bastien

25 November 2023 13	Clermont	0–3	Lens	Clermont-Ferrand
17:00 CET (UTC+1)	Kyei (yellow card) 32'; Seidu (red card) 45+2'; Gonalons (yellow card) 68'	Report	Wahi 11', (yellow card) 45+1' (yellow-red card) 45+2'; Thomasson 50'; Khusanov (yellow card) 70'; Saïd 82'	Stadium: Stade Gabriel-Montpied; Attendance: 10,455; Referee: Benoît Millot

2 December 2023 14	Lens	3–2	Lyon	Lens
17:00 CET (UTC+1)	Saïd 26'; Machado (yellow card) 34'; Medina (yellow card) 41'; Frankowski 52' (pen.), 74'; Sotoca (red card) 90+1'	Report	O'Brien 15', 72'	Stadium: Stade Bollaert-Delelis; Attendance: 38,130; Referee: Clément Turpin

8 December 2023 15	Montpellier	0–0	Lens	Montpellier
21:00 CET (UTC+1)	Delaye (yellow card) 84'; Ferri (yellow card) 90+2'	Report	Danso (yellow card) 12'; Frankowski (yellow card) 29'; Gradit (yellow card) 90+2'	Stadium: Stade de la Mosson; Attendance: 14,159; Referee: Stéphanie Frappart

16 December 2023 16	Lens	2–0	Reims	Lens
21:00 CET (UTC+1)	Saïd 43'; Cortés 75'	Report	Matusiwa (yellow card) 21'	Stadium: Stade Bollaert-Delelis; Attendance: 38,055; Referee: François Letexier

20 December 2023 17	Nice	2–0	Lens	Nice
21:00 CET (UTC+1)	Lotomba (yellow card) 26'; Moffi 76' (pen.), 78'; Dante (yellow card) 90+3'	Report	Khusanov (yellow card) 88'; Guilavogui (yellow card) 90+6'	Stadium: Allianz Riviera; Attendance: 25,041; Referee: Hakim Ben El Hadj

14 January 2024 18	Lens	0–2	Paris Saint-Germain	Lens
20:45 CET (UTC+1)	Frankowski (penalty missed) 7'; Gradit (red card) 45+3'	Report	Barcola 30'; Soler (yellow card) 52'; K. Mbappé 89'	Stadium: Stade Bollaert-Delelis; Attendance: 38,200; Referee: Jérôme Brisard

28 January 2024 19	Toulouse	0–2	Lens	Toulouse
17:50 CET (UTC+1)	Dønnum (yellow card) 40'; Nicolaisen (yellow card) 45'; Suazo (yellow card) 49'; Sierro (penalty missed) 84'	Report	Saïd (yellow card) 36'; Costa 42'; Diouf 56'; Haïdara (yellow card) 83'; Sotoca (yellow card) 90'	Stadium: Stadium de Toulouse; Attendance: 27,310; Referee: Mathieu Vernice

3 February 2024 20	Nantes	0–1	Lens	Nantes
21:00 CET (UTC+1)	Kadewere (yellow card) 27'; Douglas Augusto (yellow card) 61'	Report	Costa 48'; Aguilar (yellow card) 82'; Danso (yellow card) 82'	Stadium: Stade de la Beaujoire; Attendance: 34,167; Referee: Florent Batta

10 February 2024 21	Lens	3–1	Strasbourg	Lens
17:00 CET (UTC+1)	Wahi 16'; Costa 30', (yellow card) 61'; Medina (yellow card) 37'; Sotoca 58'	Report	Delaine 43', (yellow card) 68'	Stadium: Stade Bollaert-Delelis; Attendance: 38,161; Referee: Willy Delajod

18 February 2024 22	Reims	1–1	Lens	Reims
17:05 CET (UTC+1)	Diakité (yellow card) 22', (goal) 42'; Okumu (yellow card) 52'	Report	Khusanov (yellow card) 19'; Saïd 45+1'; Medina (yellow card) 67'	Stadium: Stade Auguste-Delaune; Attendance: 20,116; Referee: Benoît Millot

25 February 2024 23	Lens	2–3	Monaco	Lens
13:00 CET (UTC+1)	Wahi 31', (yellow card) 90+5'; Medina (yellow card) 45+3'; Thomasson (yellow card) 53'; Mendy (yellow card) 64'; Saïd 77'; Samba (yellow card) 82'	Report	Balogun 19', (penalty missed) 82'; Ouattara (yellow card) 25'; Samba 30' (o.g.); Minamino 90+2'; Diop (yellow card) 90+5'; Majecki (yellow card) 90+6'	Stadium: Stade Bollaert-Delelis; Attendance: 37,992; Referee: François Letexier

3 March 2024 24	Lyon	0–3	Lens	Décines-Charpieu
20:45 CET (UTC+1)	Maitland-Niles (red card) 84'	Report	Gradit (yellow card) 29'; Sotoca 43'; Wahi 53' (pen.); Danso (yellow card) 83', (goal) 87'	Stadium: Parc Olympique Lyonnais; Attendance: 48,242; Referee: Jérôme Brisard

9 March 2024 25	Lens	1–0	Brest	Lens
21:00 CET (UTC+1)	Khusanov (yellow card) 7'; Aguilar 32'	Report	Magnetti (yellow card) 69'; Satriano (yellow card) 90+2'	Stadium: Stade Bollaert-Delelis; Attendance: 38,016; Referee: Stéphanie Frappart

16 March 2024 26	Lens	1–3	Nice	Lens
21:00 CET (UTC+1)	Aguilar (yellow card) 37'; Frankowski (yellow card) 62'; Khusanov (yellow card) 65'; Wahi 76'; Thomasson (yellow card) 89'	Report	Moffi 11', 67' (pen.); Thuram (yellow card) 40', (goal) 53'; Perraud (yellow card) 46'; Rosario (yellow card) 78'	Stadium: Stade Bollaert-Delelis; Attendance: 37,346; Referee: Benoît Bastien

29 March 2024 27	Lille	2–1	Lens	Villeneuve-d'Ascq
21:00 CET (UTC+1)	Zhegrova 9', 60', (yellow card) 64'; André (yellow card) 52'; Bentaleb (yellow card) 88'	Report	Medina (yellow card) 35'; Wahi (yellow card) 64', (goal) 78'; Costa (yellow card) 88'	Stadium: Stade Pierre-Mauroy; Attendance: 48,233; Referee: Willy Delajod

6 April 2024 28	Lens	1–1	Le Havre	Lens
17:00 CEST (UTC+2)	Frankowski 58'; Gradit (yellow card) 62'; Aguilar (yellow card) 73'	Report	Ayew (yellow card) 51'; Opéri (yellow card) 63'; Kechta (yellow card) 69'; Sabbi 78' (pen.); Touré (yellow card) 90+2'; Bayo (yellow card) 90+5'	Stadium: Stade Bollaert-Delelis; Attendance: 38,223; Referee: François Letexier

12 April 2024 29	Metz	2–1	Lens	Metz
21:00 CEST (UTC+2)	Van Den Kerkhof (yellow card) 21'; Mikautadze 34', 45+3'; Traoré (yellow card) 44'	Report	Sotoca 13' (pen.); Gradit (yellow card) 44'; Diouf (yellow card) 45+1'; Machado (yellow card) 46'; Chavez (yellow card) 74'; Frankowski (yellow card) 78'	Stadium: Stade Saint-Symphorien; Attendance: 23,002; Referee: Romain Lissorgue

20 April 2024 30	Lens	1–0	Clermont	Lens
21:00 CEST (UTC+2)	Sotoca 3' (pen.); Machado (yellow card) 54'	Report	Gastien (yellow card) 18'; Rashani (yellow card) 40'; Keïta (yellow card) 45'; Magnin (yellow card) 79'	Stadium: Stade Bollaert-Delelis; Attendance: 37,495; Referee: Benoît Bastien

28 April 2024 31	Marseille	2–1	Lens	Marseille
21:00 CEST (UTC+2)	Aubameyang 1'; Gueye (yellow card) 41', (goal) 85'; Balerdi (yellow card) 63'	Report	Danso (yellow card) 54'; Wahi (yellow card) 65'; Saïd 77'	Stadium: Stade Vélodrome; Attendance: 59,490; Referee: Eric Wattellier

3 May 2024 32	Lens	2–0	Lorient	Lens
21:00 CEST (UTC+2)	Wahi 57', (yellow card) 58'; Costa 81'	Report	Bakayoko (yellow card) 20'; Katseris (yellow card) 71'	Stadium: Stade Bollaert-Delelis; Attendance: 37,569; Referee: Jérémie Pignard

12 May 2024 33	Rennes	1–1	Lens	Roazhon Park
21:00 CEST (UTC+2)	Seidu (yellow card) 42'; Salah 82'; Wooh (yellow card) 83'	Report	Costa (yellow card) 21'; Medina (yellow card) 35'; Fulgini 48'; Sotoca (yellow card) 88'	Stadium: Stade Bollaert-Delelis; Attendance: 28,660; Referee: Benoît Millot

19 May 2024 34	Lens	2–2	Montpellier	Lens
21:00 CEST (UTC+2)	Wahi 4'; Machado 45+3'	Report	Maamma 58'; Mincarelli 74'; Khazri (yellow card) 90+5'	Stadium: Stade Bollaert-Delelis; Attendance: 37,433; Referee: Thomas Léonard

=== Coupe de France ===
7 January 2024 Round of 64	Lens	2–2 (5–6 p)	Monaco	Lens
14:30 CET (UTC+1)	Maouassa (yellow card) 23', (goal) 43'; Samba (yellow card) 45+3'; Sotoca 62'; Frankowski (yellow card) 88'	Report	Ben Yedder 1'; Akliouche 21', (yellow card) 53'; Majecki (yellow card) 79'	Stadium: Stade Bollaert-Delelis; Attendance: 37,571; Referee: Bastien Dechepy
	Penalties
	Saïd (penalty missed); Sotoca (penalty scored); Fulgini (penalty missed); Medina (penalty missed); Danso (penalty scored); Frankowski (penalty scored); Aguilar (penalty scored); El Aynaoui (penalty scored); Thomasson (penalty missed)		(penalty scored) Ben Yedder; (penalty missed) Fofana; (penalty missed) Vanderson; (penalty missed) Boadu; (penalty scored) Zakaria; (penalty scored) Maripán; (penalty scored) Diop; (penalty scored) Ouattara; (penalty scored) Magassa

=== UEFA Champions League ===
==== Group stage ====
The draw for the group stage was held on 31 August 2023.

Pos	Team	Pld	W	D	L	GF	GA	GD	Pts	Qualification	ARS	PSV	LEN	SEV
1	(England) Arsenal	6	4	1	1	16	4	+12	13	Advance to knockout phase	—	4–0	6–0	2–0
2	(Netherlands) PSV Eindhoven	6	2	3	1	8	10	−2	9	Advance to knockout phase	1–1	—	1–0	2–2
3	(France) Lens	6	2	2	2	6	11	−5	8	Transfer to Europa League	2–1	1–1	—	2–1
4	(Spain) Sevilla	6	0	2	4	7	12	−5	2		1–2	2–3	1–1	—

Source: UEFA
Rules for classification: Group stage tiebreakers

20 September 2023 1	Sevilla (Spain)	1–1	(France) Lens	Seville, Spain
21:00 CEST (UTC+2)	Ocampos 9', (yellow card) 73'; Gudelj (yellow card) 37'; Ramos (yellow card) 70'	Report	Medina (yellow card) 14'; Sotoca (yellow card) 17'; Samba (yellow card) 18'; Fulgini 24', (yellow card) 30'; Haïdara (yellow card) 90'	Stadium: Ramón Sánchez Pizjuán; Attendance: 33,544; Referee: Tobias Stieler (Germany)

3 October 2023 2	Lens (France)	2–1	(England) Arsenal	Lens
21:00 CEST (UTC+2)	Thomasson 25'; Wahi 69'; Abdul Samed (yellow card) 90'	Report	Gabriel Jesus 14', (yellow card) 90'	Stadium: Stade Bollaert-Delelis; Attendance: 37,040; Referee: Marco Guida (Italy)

24 October 2023 3	Lens (France)	1–1	(Netherlands) PSV Eindhoven	Lens
21:00 CEST (UTC+2)	Mendy (yellow card) 52'; Wahi 65'; Abdul Samed (yellow card) 90+3'; Saïd (yellow card) 90+4'; Thomasson (yellow card) 90+4'	Report	Ramalho (yellow card) 30'; Bakayoko 54'; Boscagli (yellow card) 70'; Pepi (yellow card) 90+3'	Stadium: Stade Bollaert-Delelis; Attendance: 38,133; Referee: Radu Petrescu (Romania)

8 November 2023 4	PSV Eindhoven (Netherlands)	1–0	(France) Lens	Eindhoven, Netherlands
21:00 CET (UTC+1)	De Jong 12'; Lozano (yellow card) 38'; Ramalho (yellow card) 45+2'	Report	Machado (yellow card) 42'; Danso (yellow card) 43'; Wahi (yellow card) 45+1'; Sotoca (yellow card) 45+1'; Gradit (yellow card) 52'; Medina (yellow card) 53'; Guilavogui (yellow card) 82' (yellow-red card) 90+2'	Stadium: Philips Stadion; Attendance: 34,200; Referee: Daniel Siebert (Germany)

29 November 2023 5	Arsenal (England)	6–0	(France) Lens	London, England
20:00 GMT (UTC+0)	Havertz 13'; Gabriel Jesus 21'; Saka 23'; Martinelli 27'; Ødegaard 45+1'; Jorginho 86' (pen.)	Report	Mendy (yellow card) 41'; Khusanov (yellow card) 63'; Haïdara (yellow card) 64'	Stadium: Emirates Stadium; Attendance: 59,987; Referee: Artur Soares Dias (Portugal)

12 December 2023 6	Lens (France)	2–1	(Spain) Sevilla	Lens
18:45 CET (UTC+1)	El Aynaoui (yellow card) 37'; Frankowski 63' (pen.); Medina (yellow card) 75'; Fulgini (yellow card) 85', (goal) 90+6'; Danso (yellow card) 90+9'	Report	Soumaré (yellow card) 61'; Salas (yellow card) 65'; Ramos 79' (pen.), (yellow card) 80'; Mir (yellow card) 90+9'	Stadium: Stade Bollaert-Delelis; Attendance: 37,456; Referee: Felix Zwayer (Germany)

=== UEFA Europa League ===
==== Knockout phase ====
===== Knockout round play-offs =====
The draw for the knockout round play-offs was held on 18 December 2023.

15 February 2024 First leg	Lens (France)	0–0	(Germany) SC Freiburg	Lens
21:00 CET (UTC+1)	Gradit (yellow card) 38'; Danso (yellow card) 42'; Saïd (yellow card) 81'	Report	Philipp (yellow card) 90'	Stadium: Stade Bollaert-Delelis; Attendance: 38,194; Referee: Bartosz Frankowski (Poland)

22 February 2024 Second leg	SC Freiburg (Germany)	3–2 (a.e.t.) (3–2 agg.)	(France) Lens	Freiburg, Germany
18:45 CET (UTC+1)	Höler (yellow card) 43'; Kübler (yellow card) 62'; Sallai 67', 90+2'; Gregoritsch 99'	Report	Costa 28'; Wahi 45+2'; Frankowski (yellow card) 65'; Sotoca (yellow card) 67'; Fulgini (yellow card) 95'; Medina (yellow card) 105+3'; Saïd (yellow card) 120+2'; Samba (yellow card) 120+2'	Stadium: Europa-Park Stadion; Attendance: 33,911; Referee: Rade Obrenovič (Slovenia)
