= 2022–23 RC Lens season =

RC Lens
2022–23 season
- President: Joseph Oughourlian
- Head coach: Franck Haise
- Stadium: Stade Bollaert-Delelis
- Ligue 1: 2nd
- Coupe de France: Quarter-finals
- Top goalscorer: League: Loïs Openda (21); All: Loïs Openda (21)
- Highest home attendance: 38,223 vs Strasbourg, 7 April 2023, Ligue 1
Home colours	Away colours	Third colours

The 2022–23 RC Lens season was the club's 117th season in existence and the club's third consecutive season in the top flight of French football. In addition to the domestic league, Lens participated in this season's edition of the Coupe de France. The season covers the period from 1 July 2022 to 30 June 2023.

== Players ==
=== First-team squad ===
As of 1 February 2023.

Note: Flags indicate national team as defined under FIFA eligibility rules; some limited exceptions apply. Players may hold more than one non-FIFA nationality.

No.	Pos.	Nation	Player
1	GK	VEN	Wuilker Faríñez
3	DF	COL	Deiver Machado
4	DF	AUT	Kevin Danso
6	MF	CMR	Jean Onana
7	FW	FRA	Florian Sotoca
8	MF	CIV	Seko Fofana (captain)
9	FW	POL	Adam Buksa
10	MF	POR	David Costa
11	FW	BEL	Loïs Openda
13	MF	POL	Łukasz Poręba
14	DF	ARG	Facundo Medina
15	DF	CPV	Steven Fortès
16	GK	FRA	Jean-Louis Leca
18	FW	FRA	Alexis Claude-Maurice (on loan from Nice)
19	MF	FRA	Jimmy Cabot

No.	Pos.	Nation	Player
20	MF	FRA	Angelo Fulgini (on loan from Mainz 05)
21	DF	MLI	Massadio Haïdara
22	FW	FRA	Wesley Saïd
23	DF	COM	Ismaël Boura
24	DF	FRA	Jonathan Gradit
25	DF	FRA	Julien Le Cardinal
26	MF	GHA	Salis Abdul Samed
28	MF	FRA	Adrien Thomasson
29	MF	POL	Przemysław Frankowski
30	GK	FRA	Brice Samba
34	MF	MLI	Yaya Fofana
35	DF	FRA	Adrien Louveau
40	GK	COM	Yannick Pandor
—	MF	SEN	Mamadou Camara

=== Out on loan ===
Note: Flags indicate national team as defined under FIFA eligibility rules; some limited exceptions apply. Players may hold more than one non-FIFA nationality.

No. / Pos. / Nation / Player; — / MF / FRA / Tom Ducrocq (on loan to Bastia)	No. / Pos. / Nation / Player; — / FW / FRA / Ibrahima Baldé (on loan to Annecy)

== Transfers ==
=== In ===
No.	Pos	Player	Transferred from	Fee	Date	Source
26	MF	(Ghana) Salis Abdul Samed	(France) Clermont	Undisclosed	24 June 2022	
13	MF	(Poland) Łukasz Poręba	(Poland) Zagłębie Lubin	Free	1 July 2022	
30	GK	(Republic of the Congo) Brice Samba	(England) Nottingham Forest	Undisclosed	5 July 2022	
11	FW	(Belgium) Loïs Openda	(Belgium) Club Brugge	Undisclosed	6 July 2022	

=== Out ===
No.	Pos	Player	Transferred to	Fee	Date	Source
25	FW	(France) Corentin Jean	(United States) Inter Miami	Undisclosed	29 June 2022	
28	MF	(Mali) Cheick Doucouré	(England) Crystal Palace	Undisclosed	11 July 2022	

== Pre-season and friendlies ==
Win Draw Loss Fixtures

2 July 2022 Friendly	Lens	0–0	Paris FC	Calais
15:00 CEST (UTC+2)				Stadium: Stade de l'Epopée

8 July 2022 Friendly	Lens	3–0	Valenciennes	Avion
16:00 CEST (UTC+2)	Camara 48'; Clauss 52'; Danso 64'			Stadium: Stade Daniel Leclercq

16 July 2022 Friendly	Rodez	0–1	Lens	Rodez
11:00 CEST (UTC+2)			Banza 30'	Stadium: Stade Paul Lignon
Note: Match was played in two 30-minute halves.

16 July 2022 Friendly	Clermont	1–3	Lens	Rodez
16:00 CEST (UTC+2)	Chader 76'		Machado 34'; Kakuta 40'; Saïd 87'	Stadium: Stade Paul Lignon

23 July 2022 Friendly	Lens	1–0	Inter Milan	Lens
18:30 CEST (UTC+2)	Gradit (yellow card) 39'; Samba (yellow card) 56'; Berg (yellow card) 86'; Openda 90'	Report	Džeko (yellow card) 29'; Dumfries (yellow card) 56'; Brozović (yellow card) 61'	Stadium: Stade Bollaert-Delelis; Attendance: 33,242; Referee: Marc Bollengier

30 July 2022 Friendly	Lens	0–0	West Ham United	Lens
18:15 CEST (UTC+2)				Stadium: Stade Bollaert-Delelis; Referee: Marc Bollengier

10 December 2022 Friendly	Montpellier	1–2	Lens	San Pedro de Alcántara, Spain
16:00 CET (UTC+1)				Stadium: Marbella Football Center - Sur 2

17 December 2022 Friendly	Lens	3–0	Le Havre	Lens
13:00 CET (UTC+1)	Machado 10', 24'; Openda (penalty missed) 89'; Sotoca 90'			Stadium: Stade Bollaert-Delelis

17 December 2022 Friendly	Lens	0–0	Le Havre	Lens
15:30 CET (UTC+1)				Stadium: Stade Bollaert-Delelis
Note: Match was played in two 35-minute halves.

== Competitions ==
=== Overall record ===
Competition	First match	Last match	Starting round	Final position	Record							
Competition	First match	Last match	Starting round	Final position	Pld	W	D	L	GF	GA	GD	Win %
Ligue 1	7 August 2022	3 June 2023	Matchday 1	2nd	38	25	9	4	68	29	+39	65.79
Coupe de France	7 January 2023	1 March 2023	Round of 64	Quarter-finals	4	2	1	1	7	4	+3	50.00
Total					42	27	10	5	75	33	+42	64.29

Source: Soccerway

=== Ligue 1 ===
==== League table ====
Pos	Team	Pld	W	D	L	GF	GA	GD	Pts	Qualification or relegation
1	Paris Saint-Germain (C)	38	27	4	7	89	40	+49	85	Qualification for the Champions League group stage
2	Lens	38	25	9	4	68	29	+39	84	Qualification for the Champions League group stage
3	Marseille	38	22	7	9	67	40	+27	73	Qualification for the Champions League third qualifying round
4	Rennes	38	21	5	12	69	39	+30	68	Qualification for the Europa League group stage
5	Lille	38	19	10	9	65	44	+21	67	Qualification for the Europa Conference League play-off round

Source: Ligue 1
Rules for classification: 1) Points; 2) Goal difference; 3) Head-to-head points; 4) Head-to-head goal difference; 5) Head-to-head goals scored; 6) Head-to-head away goals scored; 7) Goals scored; 8) Away goals scored; 9) Fair-play points (Note: Head-to-head record is used only after all the matches between the teams in question have been played).
(C) Champions

==== Results summary ====
Overall								Home						Away					
Pld	W	D	L	GF	GA	GD	Pts	W	D	L	GF	GA	GD	W	D	L	GF	GA	GD
38	25	9	4	68	29	+39	84	17	1	1	41	13	+28	8	8	3	27	16	+11

Source: Ligue 1

==== Results by round ====
Round	1	2	3	4	5	6	7	8	9	10	11	12	13	14	15	16	17	18	19	20	21	22	23	24	25	26	27	28	29	30	31	32	33	34	35	36	37	38
Ground	H	A	A	H	H	A	H	A	H	A	H	A	H	A	H	A	H	A	H	A	H	A	A	H	A	H	A	H	A	H	A	H	A	H	H	A	H	A
Result	W	D	W	W	W	D	W	D	W	L	W	W	W	W	W	D	W	D	W	D	L	D	L	W	D	D	W	W	W	W	L	W	W	W	W	W	W	W
Position	5	6	2	3	2	3	3	4	4	4	3	2	2	2	2	2	2	2	2	2	3	3	4	4	4	4	3	3	2	2	3	3	3	2	2	2	2	2
Points	3	4	7	10	13	14	17	18	21	21	24	27	30	33	36	37	40	41	44	45	45	46	46	49	50	51	54	57	60	63	63	66	69	72	75	78	81	84

Source: Ligue 1
A = Away; H = Home; W = Win; D = Draw; L = Loss

==== Matches ====
The league fixtures were announced on 17 June 2022.

7 August 2022 1	Lens	3–2	Brest	Lens
15:00 CEST (UTC+2)	Sotoca 26', 61', 64'; Costa (yellow card) 37'; Danso (yellow card) 77'	Report	Lees-Melou (yellow card) 30'; Belaïli (yellow card) 42'; Brassier (yellow card) 61'; Belkebla 65'; Chardonnet (yellow card) 70'; Del Castillo 81' (pen.)	Stadium: Stade Bollaert-Delelis; Attendance: 37,015; Referee: Thomas Léonard

14 August 2022 2	Ajaccio	0–0	Lens	Ajaccio
15:00 CEST (UTC+2)	Gonzalez (yellow card) 35'; Mangani (yellow card) 37'; Bayala (yellow card) 42'; Marchetti (yellow card) 59'; El Idrissy (yellow card) 79'	Report	Sotoca (yellow card) 75'; Danso (yellow card) 90+2'	Stadium: Stade François Coty; Attendance: 9,070; Referee: Stéphanie Frappart

20 August 2022 3	Monaco	1–4	Lens	Monaco
17:00 CEST (UTC+2)	Embolo (yellow card) 40'; Badiashile 41'; Vanderson (yellow card) 58' (yellow-red card) 72'; Ben Yedder (yellow card) 68'	Report	Openda 7'; Machado 38'; Fofana 55' (pen.); Saïd 78'	Stadium: Stade Louis II; Attendance: 8,700; Referee: Willy Delajod

27 August 2022 4	Lens	2–1	Rennes	Lens
21:00 CEST (UTC+2)	Fofana 65'; Openda 69'	Report	D. Doué (yellow card) 43'; Laborde 90'	Stadium: Stade Bollaert-Delelis; Attendance: 37,848; Referee: Jérôme Brisard

31 August 2022 5	Lens	5–2	Lorient	Lens
21:00 CEST (UTC+2)	Sotoca 24', 77'; Saïd 28'; Abdul Samed 57'; Gradit (yellow card) 63'; Openda 86'	Report	Moffi 41', 50', (yellow card) 63'; Ouattara (yellow card) 58'; Abergel (yellow card) 60'	Stadium: Stade Bollaert-Delelis; Attendance: 37,161; Referee: Benoît Bastien

4 September 2022 6	Reims	1–1	Lens	Reims
15:00 CEST (UTC+2)	Gravillon (yellow card) 33'; Locko (yellow card) 46'; Balogun 72'	Report	Medina (yellow card) 45'; Gradit (yellow card) 56'; Machado (red card) 67'; Openda 82'	Stadium: Stade Auguste-Delaune; Attendance: 15,761; Referee: Eric Wattelier

9 September 2022 7	Lens	1–0	Troyes	Lens
21:00 CEST (UTC+2)	Danso 39'; Poręba (yellow card) 41'; Cabot (yellow card) 77'	Report	Tardieu (yellow card) 77'	Stadium: Stade Bollaert-Delelis; Attendance: 37,344; Referee: Hakim Ben El Hadj

18 September 2022 8	Nantes	0–0	Lens	Nantes
17:05 CEST (UTC+2)	Moutoussamy (yellow card) 79'	Report	Abdul Samed (yellow card) 90+2'	Stadium: Stade de la Beaujoire; Attendance: 28,854; Referee: Willy Delajod

2 October 2022 9	Lens	1–0	Lyon	Lens
20:45 CEST (UTC+2)	Sotoca (yellow card) 78', (goal) 82' (pen.); Saïd (yellow card) 89'	Report	Tagliafico (yellow card) 27'; Reine-Adélaïde (yellow card) 79'	Stadium: Stade Bollaert-Delelis; Attendance: 36,674; Referee: Benoît Bastien

9 October 2022 10	Lille	1–0	Lens	Villeneuve-d'Ascq
20:45 CEST (UTC+2)	Fonte (yellow card) 14'; Ang. Gomes (yellow card) 37'; André (yellow card) 38'; David 44' (pen.)	Report	Cabot (yellow card) 4'; Medina (yellow card) 30'; Haïdara (yellow card) 43'; Machado (yellow card) 53'; Frankowski (yellow card) 90+2'	Stadium: Stade Pierre-Mauroy; Attendance: 48,527; Referee: François Letexier

15 October 2022 11	Lens	1–0	Montpellier	Lens
21:00 CEST (UTC+2)	Medina (yellow card) 19'; Saïd 67'; Machado (yellow card) 65'	Report	Wahi (yellow card) 19'; Estève (yellow card) 31'	Stadium: Stade Bollaert-Delelis; Attendance: 37,320; Referee: Hakim Ben El Hadj

22 October 2022 12	Marseille	0–1	Lens	Marseille
21:00 CEST (UTC+2)	Kolašinac (yellow card) 14'; Rongier (yellow card) 23'; Guendouzi (yellow card) 64'	Report	Sotoca (yellow card) 34'; Onana (yellow card) 38'; Haidara (yellow card) 50'; Costa 78'	Stadium: Stade Vélodrome; Attendance: 56,414; Referee: Benoît Millot

28 October 2022 13	Lens	3–0	Toulouse	Lens
21:00 CEST (UTC+2)	Fofana (penalty missed) 49'; Openda 60', 86', 90+2', (yellow card) 90+3'; Haïdara (yellow card) 67'	Report	Dejaegere (yellow card) 80'	Stadium: Stade Bollaert-Delelis; Attendance: 37,488; Referee: Florent Batta

5 November 2022 14	Angers	1–2	Lens	Angers
21:00 CET (UTC+1)	Capelle (yellow card) 77'; Blažič 87'	Report	Saïd 21'; Medina 51'; Samba (yellow card) 86'; Danso (yellow card) 90+2'	Stadium: Stade Raymond Kopa; Attendance: 11,585; Referee: Thomas Léonard

12 November 2022 15	Lens	2–1	Clermont	Lens
17:00 CET (UTC+1)	Saïd 60'; Abdul Samed (yellow card) 65'; Fofana 68'	Report	Abdul Samed 38' (o.g.); Kyei (yellow card) 42'; Gastien (yellow card) 45+1'; Andrić (yellow card) 85'	Stadium: Stade Bollaert-Delelis; Attendance: 37,519; Referee: Hakim Ben El Hadj

29 December 2022 16	Nice	0–0	Lens	Nice
21:00 CET (UTC+1)	Pépé (yellow card) 78'; Diop (yellow card) 78'	Report	Saïd (yellow card) 45+1'; Machado (yellow card) 60'; Gradit (yellow card) 78'	Stadium: Allianz Riviera; Attendance: 24,672; Referee: Benoît Millot

1 January 2023 17	Lens	3–1	Paris Saint-Germain	Lens
20:45 CET (UTC+1)	Frankowski 4'; Openda 27'; Abdul Samed (yellow card) 40'; Gradit (yellow card) 45'; Claude-Maurice 46'	Report	Ekitike 7'; Hakimi (yellow card) 45'; Gharbi (yellow card) 87'; Verratti (yellow card) 90'	Stadium: Stade Bollaert-Delelis; Attendance: 38,047; Referee: Jérôme Brisard

11 January 2023 18	Strasbourg	2–2	Lens	Strasbourg
21:00 CET (UTC+1)	Prcić 13'; Gameiro 16'; Perrin (yellow card) 27'	Report	Onana (yellow card) 4'; Claude-Maurice 11'; Openda 33'	Stadium: Stade de la Meinau; Attendance: 25,624; Referee: François Letexier

14 January 2023 19	Lens	1–0	Auxerre	Lens
17:00 CET (UTC+1)	Danso (yellow card) 26'; Medina (yellow card) 53'; Frankowski 58' (pen.)	Report	Touré (yellow card) 53' (yellow-red card) 64'; Da Costa (yellow card) 90'	Stadium: Stade Bollaert-Delelis; Attendance: 38,208; Referee: Willy Delajod

28 January 2023 20	Troyes	1–1	Lens	Troyes
17:00 CET (UTC+1)	M. Baldé (yellow card) 24'; Larouci 50'; Chavalerin (yellow card) 86'	Report	Danso (yellow card) 9'; Thomasson 88'	Stadium: Stade de l'Aube; Attendance: 13,500; Referee: Clément Turpin

1 February 2023 21	Lens	0–1	Nice	Lens
17:00 CET (UTC+1)		Report	Laborde 57'; Rosario (yellow card) 76'; Ramsey (yellow card) 79'	Stadium: Stade Bollaert-Delelis; Attendance: 37,437; Referee: Thomas Léonard

5 February 2023 22	Brest	1–1	Lens	Brest
17:05 CET (UTC+1)	Camara (yellow card) 25'; Hérelle (yellow card) 29'; Lees-Melou (yellow card) 38'; Le Douaron 54'; Bizot (yellow card) 79'	Report	Medina (yellow card) 25'; Fofana (yellow card) 73'; Gradit 83'	Stadium: Stade Francis-Le Blé; Attendance: 11,639; Referee: Benoît Bastien

12 February 2023 23	Lyon	2–1	Lens	Décines-Charpieu
20:45 CET (UTC+1)	Lukeba (yellow card) 14'; Lacazette 23'; Cherki 64'	Report	Machado 39'; Abdul Samed (yellow card) 85'	Stadium: Parc Olympique Lyonnais; Attendance: 53,426; Referee: Eric Wattellier

19 February 2023 24	Lens	3–1	Nantes	Lens
17:05 CET (UTC+1)	Machado 34'; Thomasson 36'; Traoré 74' (o.g.)	Report	Mollet 41'	Stadium: Stade Bollaert-Delelis; Attendance: 37,984; Referee: Pierre Gaillouste

25 February 2023 25	Montpellier	1–1	Lens	Montpellier
21:00 CET (UTC+1)	Maouassa 59'	Report	Fulgini 4'; Danso (yellow card) 20'; Sotoca (yellow card) 23'; Costa (yellow card) 85'	Stadium: Stade de la Mosson; Attendance: 17,074; Referee: Jérôme Brisard

4 March 2023 26	Lens	1–1	Lille	Lens
17:00 CET (UTC+1)	Fofana (yellow card) 23'; Fonte 41' (o.g.); Gradit (yellow card) 90+1'	Report	And. Gomes (yellow card) 2'; Fonte (yellow card) 27'; André (yellow card) 44'; David 69'; Alexsandro (yellow card) 90+1'	Stadium: Stade Bollaert-Delelis; Attendance: 37,974; Referee: François Letexier

12 March 2023 27	Clermont	0–4	Lens	Clermont-Ferrand
13:00 CET (UTC+1)	Borges (yellow card) 40'	Report	Openda 31', 34', 35'; Haïdara (yellow card) 45'; Claude-Maurice 76'; Machado (yellow card) 86'	Stadium: Stade Gabriel Montpied; Attendance: 12,311; Referee: Jérémy Stinat

18 March 2023 28	Lens	3–0	Angers	Lens
21:00 CET (UTC+1)	Fofana 26'; Openda 30', 46'	Report		Stadium: Stade Bollaert-Delelis; Attendance: 37,410; Referee: Bastien Dechepy

2 April 2023 29	Rennes	0–1	Lens	Rennes
21:00 CEST (UTC+2)	D. Doué (yellow card) 27'; Bourigeaud (yellow card) 82'	Report	Openda 31'; Danso (yellow card) 45+1'; Thomasson (yellow card) 61'	Stadium: Roazhon Park; Attendance: 28,556; Referee: Clément Turpin

7 April 2023 30	Lens	2–1	Strasbourg	Lens
21:00 CEST (UTC+2)	Frankowski 10'; Abdul Samed (yellow card) 45+2'; Medina 64'	Report	Bellegarde (yellow card) 22'; Djiku (yellow card) 78'; Gameiro 83'; Perrin (yellow card) 87'; Diallo (yellow card) 90+3' (yellow-red card) 90+3'	Stadium: Stade Bollaert-Delelis; Attendance: 38,223; Referee: Pierre Gaillouste

15 April 2023 31	Paris Saint-Germain	3–1	Lens	Paris
21:00 CEST (UTC+2)	Mbappé 31'; Vitinha 37'; Messi 40'	Report	Abdul Samed (red card) 19'; Frankowski 60' (pen.)	Stadium: Parc des Princes; Attendance: 47,120; Referee: Willy Delajod

22 April 2023 32	Lens	3–0	Monaco	Lens
21:00 CEST (UTC+2)	Openda 9', 16'; Thomasson 56'	Report	Maripán (yellow card) 22'; Ben Yedder (yellow card) 68'	Stadium: Stade Bollaert-Delelis; Attendance: 38,223; Referee: François Letexier

2 May 2023 33	Toulouse	0–1	Lens	Toulouse
21:00 CEST (UTC+2)	Kamanzi (yellow card) 77'	Report	Openda 32'; Frankowski (yellow card) 59'; Samba (yellow card) 83'	Stadium: Stadium de Toulouse; Attendance: 30,866; Referee: Bastien Dechepy

6 May 2023 34	Lens	2–1	Marseille	Lens
21:00 CEST (UTC+2)	Onana (yellow card) 11'; Medina (yellow card) 26'; Fofana 42'; Frankowski (yellow card) 45+1'; Openda 60'; Gradit (yellow card) 63'; Samba (yellow card) 89'	Report	Rongier (yellow card) 45+3'; Tavares (yellow card) 63'; Payet 88'	Stadium: Stade Bollaert-Delelis; Attendance: 38,220; Referee: Clément Turpin

12 May 2023 35	Lens	2–1	Reims	Lens
21:00 CEST (UTC+2)	Danso (red card) 19'; Frankowski 40' (pen.), (yellow card) 52'; Fofana 55'; Samba (yellow card) 89'	Report	Balogun 22' (pen.), (yellow card) 74'; Abdelhamid (yellow card) 38'; Flips (yellow card) 67'	Stadium: Stade Bollaert-Delelis; Attendance: 37,701; Referee: Jérémie Pignard

21 May 2023 36	Lorient	1–3	Lens	Lorient
17:05 CEST (UTC+2)	Faivre 6'; Yongwa (yellow card) 71'; Kalulu (yellow card) 75'	Report	Sotoca 20'; Thomasson 25'; Machado (yellow card) 39'; Medina (yellow card) 43'; Fofana 87'	Stadium: Stade du Moustoir; Attendance: 16,724; Referee: Stéphanie Frappart

27 May 2023 37	Lens	3–0	Ajaccio	Lens
21:00 CEST (UTC+2)	Machado 16'; Thomasson 22'; Openda 35' (pen.), (yellow card) 57'	Report	Strata (yellow card) 13'; Gonzalez (yellow card) 33'	Stadium: Stade Bollaert-Delelis; Attendance: 37,601; Referee: Thomas Léonard

3 June 2023 38	Auxerre	1–3	Lens	Auxerre
21:00 CEST (UTC+2)	Jubal (yellow card) 27'; Niang 71'	Report	Abdul Samed (yellow card) 6'; Claude-Maurice 19', 48'; Haïdara (yellow card) 69'; Openda 78'; Gradit (yellow card) 83'	Stadium: Stade de l'Abbé-Deschamps; Attendance: 17,246; Referee: Benoît Millot

=== Coupe de France ===
7 January 2023 Round of 64	Linas-Montlhéry	0–2	Lens	Bondoufle
15:30 CET (UTC+1)	Tchabo (yellow card) 22'	Report	Fofana 72'; Sotoca 77'	Stadium: Stade Robert Bobin; Attendance: 9,955; Referee: Mikael Lesage

23 January 2023 Round of 32	Brest	1–3	Lens	Brest
21:00 CET (UTC+1)	Slimani 19'; Lees-Melou (yellow card) 31'	Report	Saïd 5'; Medina 30'; Thomasson 37'	Stadium: Stade Francis-Le Blé; Attendance: 7,000; Referee: Pierre Gaillouste

9 February 2023 Round of 16	Lorient	1–1 (2–4 p)	Lens	Lorient
21:00 CET (UTC+1)	Le Fée 84'	Report	Fulgini 21'; Poręba (yellow card) 50'; Boura (yellow card) 60'; Onana (yellow card) 82'	Stadium: Stade du Moustoir; Attendance: 14,835; Referee: Jérémie Pignard
	Penalties
	Le Fée (penalty missed); Talbi (penalty scored); Doucouré (penalty scored); Koné (penalty missed)		(penalty scored) Frankowski; (penalty scored) Sotoca; (penalty scored) Thomasson; (penalty scored) Medina

1 March 2023 Quarter-finals	Nantes	2–1	Lens	Nantes
18:15 CET (UTC+1)	Delort 31' (pen.), 59' (pen.)	Report	Fofana 28'; Leca (yellow card) 90+1'	Stadium: Stade de la Beaujoire; Attendance: 0 Referee: Clément Turpin

== Statistics ==
=== Appearances and goals ===
No.	Pos	Nat	Player	Total		Ligue 1		Coupe de France	
No.	Pos	Nat	Player	Apps	Goals	Apps	Goals	Apps	Goals
Goalkeepers
1	GK	(Venezuela) VEN	Wuilker Faríñez	0	0	0	0	0	0
16	GK	(France) FRA	Jean-Louis Leca	5	0	1	0	4	0
30	GK	(France) FRA	Brice Samba	37	0	37	0	0	0
40	GK	(Comoros) COM	Yannick Pandor	0	0	0	0	0	0
Defenders
3	DF	(Colombia) COL	Deiver Machado	30	3	23+7	3	0	0
4	DF	(Austria) AUT	Kevin Danso	38	1	35	1	3	0
14	DF	(Argentina) ARG	Facundo Medina	33	3	30	2	2+1	1
15	DF	(Cape Verde) CPV	Steven Fortès	1	0	0+1	0	0	0
21	DF	(Mali) MLI	Massadio Haïdara	36	0	16+17	0	2+1	0
23	DF	(Comoros) COM	Ismaël Boura	11	0	0+9	0	2	0
24	DF	(France) FRA	Jonathan Gradit	34	1	30	1	4	0
25	DF	(France) FRA	Julien Le Cardinal	9	0	2+4	0	3	0
35	DF	(France) FRA	Adrien Louveau	0	0	0	0	0	0
Midfielders
6	MF	(Cameroon) CMR	Jean Onana	21	0	8+11	0	1+1	0
8	MF	(Ivory Coast) CIV	Seko Fofana	37	8	32+1	6	2+2	2
10	MF	(Portugal) POR	David Costa	32	1	16+13	1	2+1	0
13	MF	(Poland) POL	Łukasz Poręba	12	0	3+7	0	2	0
19	MF	(France) FRA	Jimmy Cabot	11	0	5+6	0	0	0
20	MF	(France) FRA	Angelo Fulgini	16	2	10+4	1	1+1	1
26	MF	(Ghana) GHA	Salis Abdul Samed	34	1	30	1	4	0
28	MF	(France) FRA	Adrien Thomasson	20	4	13+4	3	2+1	1
29	MF	(Poland) POL	Przemysław Frankowski	39	5	29+6	5	1+3	0
34	MF	(Mali) MLI	Yaya Fofana	0	0	0	0	0	0
	MF	(France) FRA	Nolan Hamidou Bonte	1	0	0	0	0+1	0
Forwards
7	FW	(France) FRA	Florian Sotoca	39	7	32+3	6	1+3	1
9	FW	(Poland) POL	Adam Buksa	6	0	0+6	0	0	0
11	FW	(Belgium) BEL	Loïs Openda	39	19	26+9	19	3+1	0
18	FW	(France) FRA	Alexis Claude-Maurice	19	3	4+13	3	2	0
22	FW	(France) FRA	Wesley Saïd	20	6	6+13	5	1	1
31	FW	(France) FRA	Rémy Labeau	12	0	0+10	0	1+1	0
Players transferred out during the season

Last updated: 12 May 2023
Source: Competitions
