= 2021–22 RC Lens season =

RC Lens
2021–22 season
- President: Joseph Oughourlian
- Head coach: Franck Haise
- Stadium: Stade Bollaert-Delelis
- Ligue 1: 7th
- Coupe de France: Round of 16
- Top goalscorer: League: Arnaud Kalimuendo (12); All: Arnaud Kalimuendo (13)
Home colours	Away colours	Third colours

The 2021–22 season was the 116th season in the existence of RC Lens and the club's second consecutive season in the top flight of French football. In addition to the domestic league, Lens participated in this season's edition of the Coupe de France.

== Players ==
=== First team squad ===
Note: Flags indicate national team as defined under FIFA eligibility rules; some limited exceptions apply. Players may hold more than one non-FIFA nationality.

No.	Pos.	Nation	Player
1	GK	VEN	Wuilker Faríñez
3	DF	COL	Deiver Machado
4	DF	AUT	Kevin Danso
5	DF	CMR	Christopher Wooh
6	MF	NOR	Patrick Berg
7	FW	FRA	Florian Sotoca
8	MF	CIV	Seko Fofana (vice-captain)
9	FW	CMR	Ignatius Ganago
10	MF	COD	Gaël Kakuta
11	DF	FRA	Jonathan Clauss
14	DF	ARG	Facundo Medina
15	FW	FRA	Arnaud Kalimuendo (on loan from Paris SG)

No.	Pos.	Nation	Player
16	GK	FRA	Jean-Louis Leca
18	MF	FRA	Yannick Cahuzac (captain)
20	MF	POR	David Costa
21	DF	MLI	Massadio Haïdara
22	FW	FRA	Wesley Saïd
24	DF	FRA	Jonathan Gradit
25	FW	FRA	Corentin Jean
28	MF	MLI	Cheick Doucouré
29	MF	POL	Przemysław Frankowski
30	GK	POR	Valentino Lesieur
33	FW	FRA	Ibrahima Baldé
35	DF	FRA	Adrien Louveau
40	GK	COM	Yannick Pandor

=== Out on loan ===
Note: Flags indicate national team as defined under FIFA eligibility rules; some limited exceptions apply. Players may hold more than one non-FIFA nationality.

No.	Pos.	Nation	Player
—	DF	COM	Ismaël Boura (on loan at Le Havre)
—	DF	CPV	Steven Fortès (on loan at Oostende)
—	MF	SCO	Charles Boli (on loan at Vicenza)
—	MF	FRA	Tom Ducrocq (on loan at Bastia)
—	MF	FRA	Jonathan Varane (on loan at Rodez AF)

No.	Pos.	Nation	Player
—	MF	FRA	Adam Oudjani (on loan at Stade Briochin)
—	FW	COD	Simon Banza (on loan at Famalicão)
—	FW	FRA	Boubakar Camara (on loan at Le Mans)
—	FW	FRA	Mohamed Cissé (on loan at Orléans)
—	FW	FRA	Gaëtan Robail (on loan at Valenciennes)

== Pre-season and friendlies ==
Win Draw Loss Fixtures

7 July 2021 Friendly	Lens	1–1	Standard Liège	Billy-Montigny, France
15:00 CEST (UTC+2)		Report		Stadium: Stade Paul Guerre

9 July 2021 Friendly	Lens	0–1	Union SG	Billy-Montigny, France
15:00 CEST (UTC+2)		Report		Stadium: Stade Paul Guerre

17 July 2021 Friendly	Lens	2–2	Le Havre	Le Touquet, France
15:30 CEST (UTC+2)	Banza 3', 58'	Report	Alioui 16' (pen.); Gibaud 39'	Stadium: Stade Ferdi Petit
Note: The match was played in two halves 30 minutes each.

17 July 2021 Friendly	Lens	2–2	Le Havre	Le Touquet, France
16:45 CEST (UTC+2)	Oudjani 23'; Ganago 52'	Report	Thiaré 12'; Abdelli 60'	Stadium: Stade Ferdi Petit
Note: The match was played in two halves 30 minutes each.

24 July 2021 Friendly	Reims	1–2	Lens	Boulogne-sur-Mer, France
11:00 CEST (UTC+2)	Ekitike 24'	Report	Banza 43' (pen.); Wooh 85'	Stadium: Stade de la Libération

24 July 2021 Friendly	Reims	1–1	Lens	Boulogne-sur-Mer, France
14:30 CEST (UTC+2)	Donis 56' (pen.)	Report	Cissé 20'	Stadium: Stade de la Libération

31 July 2021 Friendly	Lens	4–1	Udinese	Lens, France
18:00 CEST (UTC+2)	Wooh 13'; Boura 16'; Clauss (yellow card) 26'; Banza 45+2'; Costa 89'	Report	Makengo (yellow card) 43'; Samir 77'	Stadium: Stade Bollaert-Delelis; Referee: Thomas Léonard

2 September 2021 Friendly	Lens	3–4	Dunkerque	Avion, France
--:-- CEST (UTC+2)		Report		Stadium: La Gaillette; Attendance: 0

11 November 2021 Friendly	Lens	3–3	Zulte Waregem	Avion, France
--:-- CET (UTC+1)		Report		Stadium: La Gaillette; Attendance: 0

== Competitions ==
=== Overall record ===
Competition	First match	Last match	Starting round	Final position	Record							
Competition	First match	Last match	Starting round	Final position	Pld	W	D	L	GF	GA	GD	Win %
Ligue 1	8 August 2021	21 May 2022	Matchday 1	7th	38	17	11	10	62	48	+14	44.74
Coupe de France	19 December 2021	30 January 2022	Round of 64	Round of 16	3	1	1	1	5	6	−1	33.33
Total					41	18	12	11	67	54	+13	43.90

Source: Soccerway

=== Ligue 1 ===
==== League table ====
Pos	Team	Pld	W	D	L	GF	GA	GD	Pts	Qualification or relegation
5	Nice	38	20	7	11	52	36	+16	66 (Note: Nice were deducted one point for uncontrolled crowd trouble that caused the abandonment of their match against Marseille.)	Qualification for the Europa Conference League play-off round
6	Strasbourg	38	17	12	9	60	43	+17	63	
7	Lens	38	17	11	10	62	48	+14	62	
8	Lyon	38	17	11	10	66	51	+15	61 (Note: Lyon were deducted one point for uncontrolled crowd trouble that caused the abandonment of their match against Marseille.)	
9	Nantes	38	15	10	13	55	48	+7	55	Qualification for the Europa League group stage (Note: Nantes qualified for the Europa League group stage as the 2021–22 Coupe de France winners.)

Source: Ligue 1
Rules for classification: 1) Points; 2) Goal difference; 3) Head-to-head points; 4) Head-to-head goal difference; 5) Head-to-head goals scored; 6) Head-to-head away goals scored; 7) Goals scored; 8) Away goals scored; 9) Fair-play points (Note: Head-to-head record is used only after all the matches between the teams in question have been played).
Notes:

Pozdro dla wszystkich Grzybiarzy

==== Results summary ====
Overall								Home						Away					
Pld	W	D	L	GF	GA	GD	Pts	W	D	L	GF	GA	GD	W	D	L	GF	GA	GD
38	17	11	10	62	48	+14	62	9	7	3	35	20	+15	8	4	7	27	28	−1

Source: Ligue 1

==== Results by round ====
Round	1	2	3	4	5	6	7	8	9	10	11	12	13	14	15	16	17	18	19	20	21	22	23	24	25	26	27	28	29	30	31	32	33	34	35	36	37	38
Ground	A	H	A	H	A	H	H	A	H	A	H	A	H	A	H	A	H	A	A	H	A	H	A	H	H	A	H	A	H	A	H	A	H	A	H	A	A	H
Result	D	D	W	D	W	W	L	W	W	L	W	L	W	L	D	D	D	L	L	W	W	L	L	W	D	W	L	D	W	L	W	W	W	D	D	W	W	D
Position	8	8	6	6	5	3	4	2	2	2	2	4	2	4	5	5	5	6	9	6	6	9	9	8	10	6	10	9	8	10	8	7	7	7	8	7	7	7

Source: Ligue 1
A = Away; H = Home; W = Win; D = Draw; L = Loss

==== Matches ====
The league fixtures were announced on 25 June 2021.

8 August 2021 1	Rennes	1–1	Lens	Rennes
13:00 CEST (UTC+2)	Sulemana 14'	Report	Fofana 19', (yellow card) 36'; Machado (yellow card) 55'	Stadium: Roazhon Park; Attendance: 22,567; Referee: Bastien Dechepy

15 August 2021 2	Lens	2–2	Saint-Étienne	Lens
17:00 CEST (UTC+2)	Medina (yellow card) 18'; Ganago 36'; Fofana 77'	Report	Khazri 1'; Hamouma (yellow card) 29'; Sow (yellow card) 41'; Bouanga 52', (yellow card) 57'; Gourna-Douath (yellow card) 85'; Maçon (yellow card) 86'	Stadium: Stade Bollaert-Delelis; Attendance: 35,541; Referee: Amaury Delerue

21 August 2021 3	Monaco	0–2	Lens	Monaco
17:00 CEST (UTC+2)	Pavlović (yellow card) 83'; Golovin (red card) 86'	Report	Ganago 51'; Doucouré (red card) 61'; Leca (yellow card) 61'; Banza 90+4'	Stadium: Stade Louis II; Attendance: 6,483; Referee: Jérémie Pignard

29 August 2021 4	Lens	2–2	Lorient	Lens
15:00 CEST (UTC+2)	Danso (yellow card) 18'; Clauss 24'; Fofana 70'; Medina (yellow card) 75'	Report	Abergel (yellow card) 6'; Fontaine (yellow card) 12'; Silva (yellow card) 23'; Laurienté 27'; Monconduit 35'; Nardi (yellow card) 59'	Stadium: Stade Bollaert-Delelis; Attendance: 35,029; Referee: Willy Delajod

12 September 2021 5	Bordeaux	2–3	Lens	Bordeaux
15:00 CEST (UTC+2)	Mangas 60'; Onana (yellow card) 78', (goal) 88'; Otávio (yellow card) 90'; Gregersen (yellow card) 90+5'	Report	Kakuta 39'; Medina 43'; Gradit (yellow card) 49'; Sotoca 90+6' (pen.), (yellow card) 90+7'	Stadium: Matmut Atlantique; Attendance: 19,763; Referee: Luis Godinho

18 September 2021 6	Lens	1–0	Lille	Lens
17:00 CEST (UTC+2)	Leca (yellow card) 56'; Frankowski 74'; Sotoca (yellow card) 88'	Report	Mandava (yellow card) 21'; Çelik (yellow card) 90+4'	Stadium: Stade Bollaert-Delelis; Attendance: 36,512; Referee: Benoît Millot

22 September 2021 7	Lens	0–1	Strasbourg	Lens
21:00 CEST (UTC+2)	Doucouré (yellow card) 11'; Danso (red card) 50'; Kalimuendo (yellow card) 77'	Report	Djiku (yellow card) 56'; Diallo (yellow card) 63'; Ajorque 67'; Le Marchand (yellow card) 85'	Stadium: Stade Bollaert-Delelis; Attendance: 0 Referee: Jérémy Stinat

26 September 2021 8	Marseille	2–3	Lens	Marseille
20:45 CEST (UTC+2)	Gueye (yellow card) 7'; Guendouzi (yellow card) 7'; Payet 33', 45+2' (pen.)	Report	Sotoca 9'; Frankowski 27'; Saïd 71', (yellow card) 90+3'	Stadium: Stade Vélodrome; Attendance: 50,001; Referee: Mikael Lesage

1 October 2021 9	Lens	2–0	Reims	Lens
21:00 CEST (UTC+2)	Medina (yellow card) 26'; Danso (yellow card) 34'; Kalimuendo 45+1' (pen.), 52'; Kakuta (yellow card) 57'	Report	Ekitike (red card) 45'; Abdelhamid (yellow card) 58'	Stadium: Stade Bollaert-Delelis; Attendance: 0 Referee: Benoît Bastien

17 October 2021 10	Montpellier	1–0	Lens	Montpellier
17:00 CEST (UTC+2)	Mavididi 47'; Chotard (yellow card) 58'; Estève (yellow card) 67'; Ferri (yellow card) 68' (yellow-red card) 87'	Report	Wooh (yellow card) 29'; Costa (yellow card) 62'; Jean (yellow card) 77'; Saïd (yellow card) 81'	Stadium: Stade de la Mosson; Attendance: 12,474; Referee: Florent Batta

24 October 2021 11	Lens	4–1	Metz	Lens
15:00 CEST (UTC+2)	Saïd 14', 37'; Leca (yellow card) 65'; Ganago 83', (yellow card) 87'; Frankowski 90'	Report	Pajot (yellow card) 20'; De Préville 33'; Maïga (yellow card) 39'; N'Doram (yellow card) 53'	Stadium: Stade Bollaert-Delelis; Attendance: 35,673; Referee: Jérémie Pignard

30 October 2021 12	Lyon	2–1	Lens	Décines-Charpieu
21:00 CEST (UTC+2)	Paquetá (yellow card) 10'; Toko Ekambi 25' (pen.); Aouar 41'	Report	Sotoca (yellow card) 38'; Clauss (yellow card) 54'; Kalimuendo 61'	Stadium: Parc Olympique Lyonnais; Attendance: 50,373; Referee: Mikael Lesage

5 November 2021 13	Lens	4–0	Troyes	Lens
21:00 CET (UTC+1)	Kalimuendo 14'; Saïd 29'; Clauss 35'; Frankowski 61'; Ganago (yellow card) 69'	Report	Rodrigues (yellow card) 74'	Stadium: Stade Bollaert-Delelis; Attendance: 35,706; Referee: Thomas Léonard

21 November 2021 14	Brest	4–0	Lens	Brest
13:00 CET (UTC+1)	Mounié 3'; Chardonnet 13'; Faivre 33'; Duverne (yellow card) 58'; Le Douaron 69'	Report	Medina (yellow card) 36'; Kalimuendo (red card) 74'; Doucouré (yellow card) 76'	Stadium: Stade Francis-Le Blé; Attendance: 12,462; Referee: Eric Wattellier

26 November 2021 15	Lens	2–2	Angers	Lens
21:00 CET (UTC+1)	Kakuta 48'; Sotoca 55'; Doucouré (yellow card) 57'; Clauss (yellow card) 80'	Report	Boufal 40'; Thomas 70'	Stadium: Stade Bollaert-Delelis; Attendance: 35,713; Referee: Johan Hamel

1 December 2021 16	Clermont	2–2	Lens	Clermont-Ferrand
21:00 CET (UTC+1)	Gastien (yellow card) 9'; Ogier (yellow card) 38'; Magnin 41'; Bayo 65'; Hamel (yellow card) 81'; Diaby (red card) 84'; Dossou (yellow card) 86'	Report	Gastien 12' (o.g.); Danso (yellow card) 15'; Haïdara (yellow card) 36'; Fofana 47'; Clauss (yellow card) 56'; Frankowski (yellow card) 69'; Jean (yellow card) 90+5'	Stadium: Stade Gabriel Montpied; Attendance: 11,948; Referee: Amaury Delerue

4 December 2021 17	Lens	1–1	Paris Saint-Germain	Lens
21:00 CET (UTC+1)	Medina (yellow card) 47'; Fofana 62'; Gradit (yellow card) 90+2'	Report	Verratti (yellow card) 63'; Hakimi (yellow card) 90'; Wijnaldum 90+1'	Stadium: Stade Bollaert-Delelis; Attendance: 36,685; Referee: François Letexier

10 December 2021 18	Nantes	3–2	Lens	Nantes
21:00 CET (UTC+1)	Girotto (yellow card) 31'; Kolo Muani 49', 57'; Blas (yellow card) 60'; Chirivella (yellow card) 76'; Simon 90'	Report	Costa 7'; Kalimuendo 15'; Haïdara (yellow card) 46'; Gradit (yellow card) 60'; Medina (yellow card) 61'	Stadium: Stade de la Beaujoire; Attendance: 21,890; Referee: Stephanie Frappart

22 December 2021 19	Nice	2–1	Lens	Nice
21:00 CET (UTC+1)	Lemina 63'; Kluivert 79'	Report	Haïdara (yellow card) 23'; Kalimuendo 30'; Gradit (yellow card) 90+1'	Stadium: Allianz Riviera; Attendance: 22,065; Referee: Jérôme Brisard

8 January 2022 20	Lens	1–0	Rennes	Lens
21:00 CET (UTC+1)	Medina (yellow card) 16'; Saïd 89'	Report		Stadium: Stade Bollaert-Delelis; Attendance: 5,000; Referee: Benoît Bastien

15 January 2022 21	Saint-Étienne	1–2	Lens	Saint-Étienne
17:00 CET (UTC+1)	Boudebouz 37'; Gabriel Silva (yellow card) 90'	Report	Gradit (yellow card) 30'; Sotoca 76'; Fofana 90+5'	Stadium: Stade Geoffroy-Guichard; Attendance: 5,000; Referee: François Letexier

22 January 2022 22	Lens	0–2	Marseille	Lens
21:00 CET (UTC+1)	Danso (yellow card) 20'; Medina (yellow card) 32'; Sotoca (yellow card) 49'	Report	Payet 34' (pen.); Peres (yellow card) 71'; Bakambu 77'; Lirola (yellow card) 86'	Stadium: Stade Bollaert-Delelis; Attendance: 5,000; Referee: Stéphanie Frappart

6 February 2022 23	Lorient	2–0	Lens	Lorient
13:00 CET (UTC+1)	Soumano 43'; Koné 76'	Report	Wooh (yellow card) 45+1'; Cahuzac (red card) 77'; Haïdara (yellow card) 79'; Frankowski (yellow card) 87'	Stadium: Stade du Moustoir; Attendance: 10,687; Referee: Romain Lissorgue

13 February 2022 24	Lens	3–2	Bordeaux	Lens
17:05 CET (UTC+1)	Kalimuendo 10'; Kakuta 22' (pen.); Fofana 26'; Doucouré (yellow card) 45'; Sotoca (yellow card) 61'; Frankowski (yellow card) 89'	Report	Elis 33'; Hwang 53', (yellow card) 54'; Guilavogui (yellow card) 61'	Stadium: Stade Bollaert-Delelis; Attendance: 32,662; Referee: François Letexier

19 February 2022 25	Lens	1–1	Lyon	Lens
17:00 CET (UTC+1)	Clauss 13'	Report	Kadewere 44'; Emerson (yellow card) 70'; Dubois (yellow card) 84'	Stadium: Stade Bollaert-Delelis; Attendance: 36,624; Referee: Jérôme Brisard

27 February 2022 26	Angers	1–2	Lens	Angers
15:00 CET (UTC+1)	Fulgini 49'; Mendy (yellow card) 58'; Cho (yellow card) 60' (yellow-red card) 69'; Boufal (yellow card) 72'	Report	Doucouré (yellow card) 31'; Danso (yellow card) 40'; Mendy 73' (o.g.); Clauss 76'; Frankowski (yellow card) 89'	Stadium: Stade Raymond Kopa; Attendance: 9,499; Referee: Thomas Léonard

5 March 2022 27	Lens	0–1	Brest	Lens
17:00 CET (UTC+1)	Medina (yellow card) 67'	Report	Belkebla (yellow card) 54'; Honorat 59'	Stadium: Stade Bollaert-Delelis; Attendance: 36,305; Referee: Johan Hamel

13 March 2022 28	Metz	0–0	Lens	Metz
15:00 CET (UTC+1)	Boulaya (yellow card) 15'; De Préville (yellow card) 19'; Sarr (yellow card) 43'; Kouyaté (yellow card) 78'; N'Doram (yellow card) 89'	Report	Sotoca (yellow card) 58'; Danso (yellow card) 64'	Stadium: Stade Saint-Symphorien; Attendance: 15,687; Referee: Amaury Delerue

19 March 2022 29	Lens	3–1	Clermont	Lens
17:00 CET (UTC+1)	Danso 39'; Sotoca 45+3'; Haïdara 58', (yellow card) 82'	Report	Rashani 9'; Dossou (yellow card) 89'	Stadium: Stade Bollaert-Delelis; Attendance: 36,182; Referee: Jérémy Stinat

3 April 2022 30	Strasbourg	1–0	Lens	Strasbourg
13:00 CEST (UTC+2)	Guilbert (yellow card) 5'; Liénard (yellow card) 27'; Aholou (yellow card) 37'; Ajorque 67' (pen.); Gameiro (penalty missed) 71'	Report	Doucouré (yellow card) 30'	Stadium: Stade de la Meinau; Attendance: 26,005; Referee: François Letexier

10 April 2022 31	Lens	3–0	Nice	Lens
17:05 CEST (UTC+2)	Haïdara (red card) 17'; Doucouré (yellow card) 31', (goal) 55'; Kalimuendo 51', 67'; Sotoca (yellow card) 66'	Report	Guessand (yellow card) 38'; Gouiri (yellow card) 45+3'; Lemina (yellow card) 50' (yellow-red card) 57'; Dante (red card) 90+2'	Stadium: Stade Bollaert-Delelis; Attendance: 36,668; Referee: Willy Delajod

16 April 2022 32	Lille	1–2	Lens	Villeneuve-d'Ascq
21:00 CEST (UTC+2)	Xeka (yellow card) 18', (goal) 45+1'; David (yellow card) 29'; Sanches (yellow card) 45+3'	Report	Frankowski 4'; Kalimuendo 37'; Gradit (yellow card) 45+3'; Cahuzac (yellow card) 90'	Stadium: Stade Pierre-Mauroy; Attendance: 48,169; Referee: Jérôme Brisard

20 April 2022 33	Lens	2–0	Montpellier	Lens
21:00 CEST (UTC+2)	Costa 37', (yellow card) 70'; Ganago 75'	Report		Stadium: Stade Bollaert-Delelis; Attendance: 36,250; Referee: Romain Lissorgue

23 April 2022 34	Paris Saint-Germain	1–1	Lens	Paris
21:00 CEST (UTC+2)	Ramos (yellow card) 54'; Messi 68'; Verratti (yellow card) 73'; Marquinhos (yellow card) 78'; Neymar (yellow card) 90'	Report	Danso (yellow card) 9' (yellow-red card) 57'; Jean 88'	Stadium: Parc des Princes; Attendance: 47,000; Referee: Amaury Delerue

30 April 2022 35	Lens	2–2	Nantes	Lens
17:00 CEST (UTC+2)	Leca (red card) 19'; Costa 67'; Kalimuendo 81' (pen.)	Report	Simon 8', 32'; Pereira (yellow card) 53'; Cyprien (yellow card) 62'; Moutoussamy (yellow card) 74'; Pallois (yellow card) 80'; Lafont (yellow card) 81'	Stadium: Stade Bollaert-Delelis; Attendance: 36,727; Referee: Thomas Léonard

8 May 2022 36	Reims	1–2	Lens	Reims
15:00 CEST (UTC+2)	Zeneli 28'; Matusiwa (yellow card) 61'	Report	Sotoca 56'; Medina (yellow card) 72'; Fofana 90+1', (yellow card) 90+2'	Stadium: Stade Auguste-Delaune; Attendance: 16,962; Referee: Vítor Ferreira

14 May 2022 37	Troyes	1–3	Lens	Troyes
21:00 CEST (UTC+2)	Kaboré (yellow card) 9'; Biancone 14'	Report	Medina (yellow card) 19'; Danso 42'; Kalimuendo 45'; Clauss 71'; Frankowski (yellow card) 78'	Stadium: Stade de l'Aube; Attendance: 18,643; Referee: François Letexier

21 May 2022 38	Lens	2–2	Monaco	Lens
21:00 CEST (UTC+2)	Frankowski 30'; Danso (yellow card) 32'; Gradit (yellow card) 84'; Ganago 90+5'	Report	Badiashile 34'; Ben Yedder 62'; Volland (yellow card) 84'; Tchouaméni (yellow card) 86'; Caio (yellow card) 88'	Stadium: Stade Bollaert-Delelis; Attendance: 37,764; Referee: Benoît Bastien

=== Coupe de France ===
19 December 2021 Round of 64	Stade Poitevin FC	0–1	Lens	Poitiers
13:45 CET (UTC+1)	Neto (red card) 38'; Cattier (yellow card) 90'	Report	Ganago 36'; Wooh (yellow card) 90+2'	Stadium: Stade Michel-Amand; Attendance: 4,876; Referee: Jérôme Miguelgorry

4 January 2022 Round of 32	Lens	2–2 (4–3 p)	Lille	Lens
21:00 CET (UTC+1)	Fofana 67', 90+5', (yellow card) 90+6'	Report	Onana 28', 33'; Mandava (yellow card) 72'; Grbić (yellow card) 90'	Stadium: Stade Bollaert-Delelis; Attendance: 5,000; Referee: Willy Delajod
	Penalties
	Saïd (penalty scored); Kakuta (penalty scored); Jean (penalty scored); Clauss (penalty missed); Fofana (penalty scored)		(penalty scored) Bamba; (penalty missed) Fonte; (penalty scored) Botman; (penalty scored) Pied; (penalty missed) Sanches

30 January 2022 Round of 16	Lens	2–4	Monaco	Lens
21:00 CET (UTC+1)	Saïd 45'; Kalimuendo 53'	Report	Ben Yedder 18', 88'; Jean Lucas 27'; Diop 29'; Golovin (yellow card) 72'	Stadium: Stade Bollaert-Delelis; Attendance: 5,000; Referee: Eric Wattellier

== Statistics ==
=== Appearances and goals ===
No.	Pos	Nat	Player	Total		Ligue 1		Coupe de France	
No.	Pos	Nat	Player	Apps	Goals	Apps	Goals	Apps	Goals
Goalkeepers
1	GK	(Venezuela) VEN	Wuilker Faríñez	13	0	11	0	2	0
16	GK	(France) FRA	Jean-Louis Leca	28	0	27	0	1	0
30	GK	(Portugal) POR	Valentino Lesieur	0	0	0	0	0	0
40	GK	(Comoros) COM	Yannick Pandor	0	0	0	0	0	0
Defenders
3	DF	(Colombia) COL	Deiver Machado	22	0	5+17	0	0	0
4	DF	(Austria) AUT	Kevin Danso	36	2	32+1	2	0+3	0
5	DF	(Cameroon) CMR	Christopher Wooh	16	0	11+3	0	2	0
11	DF	(France) FRA	Jonathan Clauss	40	5	35+2	5	3	0
14	DF	(Argentina) ARG	Facundo Medina	34	1	30+1	1	3	0
21	DF	(Mali) MLI	Massadio Haïdara	21	1	12+8	1	1	0
24	DF	(France) FRA	Jonathan Gradit	37	0	35	0	1+1	0
35	DF	(France) FRA	Adrien Louveau	0	0	0	0	0	0
Midfielders
6	MF	(Norway) NOR	Patrick Berg	16	3	2+12	3	0+2	0
8	MF	(Ivory Coast) CIV	Seko Fofana	41	10	38	8	3	2
10	MF	(Democratic Republic of the Congo) COD	Gaël Kakuta	31	3	20+9	3	1+1	0
18	MF	(France) FRA	Yannick Cahuzac	17	0	6+11	0	0	0
20	MF	(Portugal) POR	David Costa	36	3	16+17	3	1+2	0
27	MF	(Scotland) SCO	Charles Boli	4	0	0+4	0	0	0
28	MF	(Mali) MLI	Cheick Doucouré	37	1	33+1	1	3	0
29	MF	(Poland) POL	Przemysław Frankowski	40	6	28+9	6	2+1	0
33	MF	(Senegal) SEN	Mamadou Camara	0	0	0	0	0	0
34	MF	(France) FRA	Jonathan Varane	1	0	0+1	0	0	0
Forwards
7	FW	(France) FRA	Florian Sotoca	38	6	28+7	6	3	0
9	FW	(Cameroon) CMR	Ignatius Ganago	29	6	11+17	5	1	1
15	FW	(France) FRA	Arnaud Kalimuendo	35	13	27+5	12	1+2	1
22	FW	(France) FRA	Wesley Saïd	23	6	7+14	5	1+1	1
25	FW	(France) FRA	Corentin Jean	20	1	1+16	1	1+2	0
33	FW	(France) FRA	Ibrahima Baldé	7	0	0+4	0	3	0
	FW	(Guinea) GUI	Jules Keita	0	0	0	0	0	0
Players transferred out during the season
19	DF	(Comoros) COM	Ismaël Boura	5	0	1+4	0	0	0
15	DF	(Cape Verde) CPV	Steven Fortès	1	0	1	0	0	0
	MF	(France) FRA	Tom Ducrocq	0	0	0	0	0	0
	MF	(France) FRA	Adam Oudjani	0	0	0	0	0	0
23	FW	(Democratic Republic of the Congo) COD	Simon Banza	4	1	1+3	1	0	0
	FW	(France) FRA	Boubakar Camara	0	0	0	0	0	0
	FW	(France) FRA	Gaëtan Robail	0	0	0	0	0	0

Last updated: 21 May 2022
Source: Competitions
