= Deiver Machado =

Colombian footballer (born 1993)

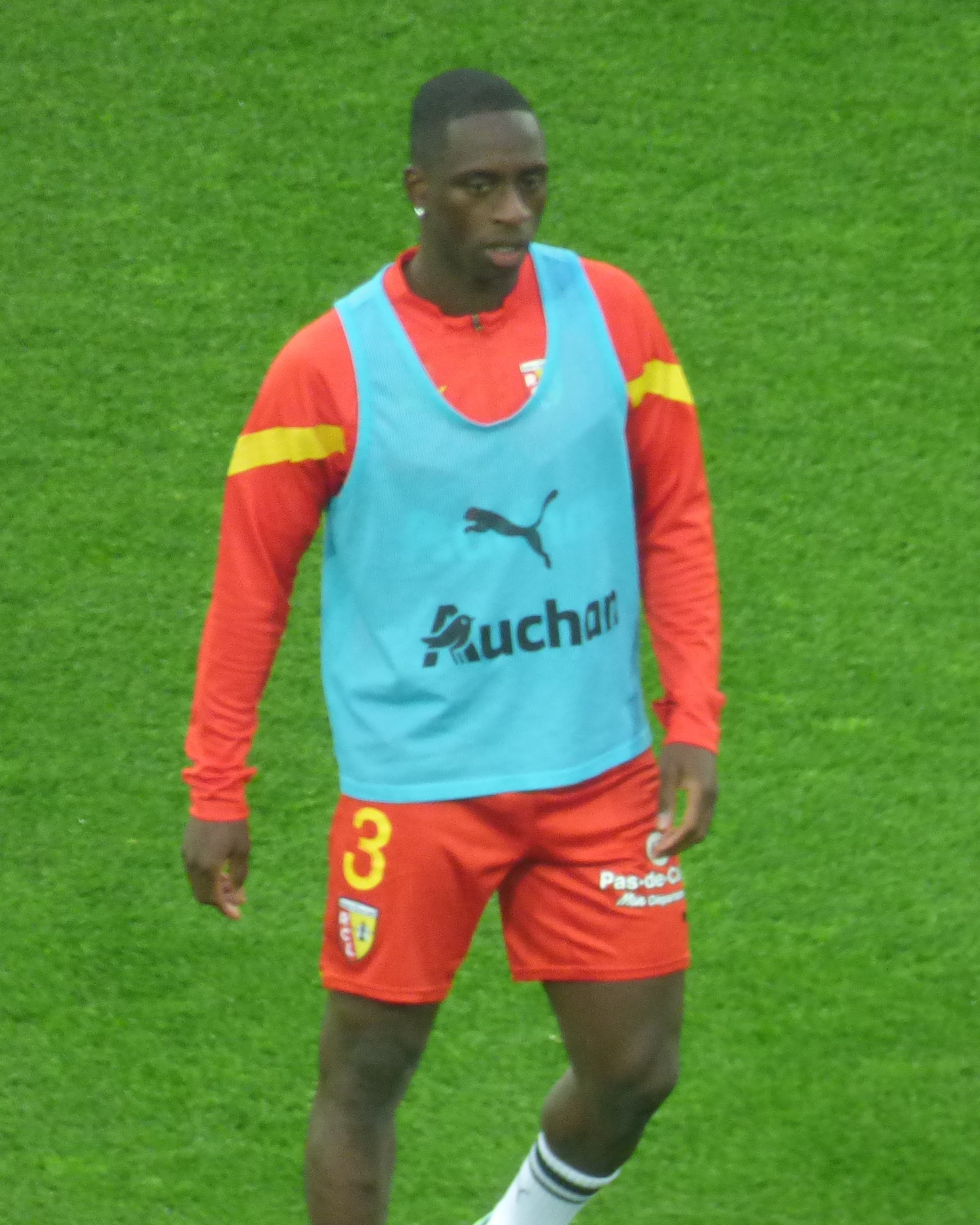
- Machado warming up for Lens in 2023

Personal information
- Full name: Deiver Andrés Machado Mena
- Date of birth: 2 September 1993 (age 33)
- Place of birth: Tadó, Colombia
- Height: 1.80 m (5 ft 11 in)
- Positions: Left-back; left wing-back

Team information
- Current team: Rodina Moscow
- Number: 20

Senior career*
Years	Team	Apps	(Gls)
2013–2014	Atlético Nacional	2	(0)
2014	→ Alianza Petrolera (loan)	24	(0)
2015–2017	Millonarios	67	(4)
2017–2018	Gent	15	(0)
2018–2020	Atlético Nacional	27	(0)
2020–2021	Toulouse	32	(1)
2021–2025	Lens	117	(9)
2025–2026	Nantes	14	(0)
2026–	Rodina Moscow	7	(1)

International career^{‡}
2016	Colombia Olympic	6	(0)
2018–	Colombia	16	(0)
Medal record
Men's football
Representing Colombia
Copa América
Runner-up	2024 United States
- * Club domestic league appearances and goals as of 22 November 2026 ‡ National team caps and goals as of 28 June 2026

Deiver Andrés Machado Mena (born 2 September 1993) is a Colombian professional footballer who plays as a left-back or left wing-back for Russian Premier League club Rodina Moscow and the Colombia national team.

Machado began his career at Atlético Nacional, before joining Alianza Petrolera on loan in 2014. He then signed for Millonarios in 2015, making over 90 appearances across three seasons. In 2017 he moved to Belgian side Gent, before returning to Atlético Nacional in 2018. After joining French side Toulouse in 2020, where he was named in the Ligue 2 Team of the Year in 2021, he signed for Lens in July 2021, spending four seasons in Ligue 1. He joined Nantes in December 2025 on a three-year contract.

Machado represented Colombia at the 2016 Summer Olympics. He made his senior international debut in 2018 and was later included in Colombia’s eventual runner-up squad for the 2024 Copa América and was also selected for the 2026 FIFA World Cup.

== Club career ==
=== Early career ===
Machado was born in Tadó, in the Chocó Department of Colombia, on 2 September 1993. He came through the academy of Atlético Nacional in Medellín, making his professional debut for the club in 2013 and making 2 appearances in that season's Categoría Primera A, the same year he won both the Apertura and Clausura league titles and a national cup with the side. In 2014, he was loaned to Alianza Petrolera — listed in club records as Alianza FC — where he made 28 appearances in the Categoría Primera A without scoring, before returning to Atlético Nacional and subsequently joining Millonarios.

=== Millonarios ===
Machado signed for Millonarios of Bogotá on 31 December 2014. He established himself as first-choice left-back across three seasons in the Liga Águila, making 32 appearances in 2015, 29 in 2016 and a further 26 before his departure in 2017.

He scored his first competitive goal for Millonarios on 20 March 2017 against Independiente Santa Fe at El Campín, netting the third in a 3–0 league victory — his goal completing a scoreline opened by Andrés Cadavid and Ayron del Valle. He scored a second league goal for the club later in the 2017 Apertura season before Millonarios went on to win the 2017 Torneo Finalización, their fifteenth national title, defeating crosstown rivals Independiente Santa Fe in an all-Bogotá final. He left the club in July 2017 to join K.A.A. Gent in Belgium.

=== Gent and loan back to Atlético Nacional (2017–2020) ===
In July 2017, Machado moved to Europe for the first time, signing a four-year contract with K.A.A. Gent in the Belgian Pro League, becoming the eleventh Colombian player to compete in the Belgian top flight. He made his debut for the club on 6 August 2017, starting at home against Royal Antwerp at the Ghelamco Arena — a 0–1 defeat in the opening round of the 2017–18 Jupiler Pro League. He made 12 league appearances and 2 Belgian Cup appearances for Gent across the 2017–18 season.

In July 2018, Gent loaned Machado back to Atlético Nacional, with the club's official website noting he remained under contract at Gent until 2021. He made 14 appearances for Nacional in 2018 and 13 in 2019, featuring in the 2019 Copa Sudamericana against Fluminense. During the 2018 loan he was part of the Nacional squad that beat Once Caldas 4–3 on aggregate to win the Copa Colombia, with Daniel Bocanegra's 91st-minute free kick at the Estadio Atanasio Girardot in the second leg securing a 2–1 victory and the title. He returned to Gent for the 2019–20 season, making 2 further league appearances, before departing to join Toulouse FC in France in 2020.

=== Toulouse ===
In 2020, Machado joined Ligue 2 side Toulouse, having accumulated over 130 career starts by the time of his arrival. In the 2020–21 Ligue 2 season he made 32 league appearances, scoring once and contributing five assists, with the RC Lens recruitment announcement describing his campaign as "full and noticed by all observers". He scored against Nantes in the Ligue 1 promotion play-offs in May 2021, one of the defining moments of his single season at the Occitan club.

=== Lens ===
On 7 July 2021, Machado signed for Ligue 1 club Lens on a three-year contract, joining from Toulouse. He made his Ligue 1 debut on 8 August 2021 on the road at Stade Rennais, playing 66 minutes in a 1–1 draw, immediately impressing with his intensity along the left flank before being replaced by Przemysław Frankowski. He made his home debut at Stade Bollaert-Delelis on 15 August 2021, in a 2–2 draw against AS Saint-Étienne.

He featured in 11 of Lens's first 12 matches of the season before being sidelined for four months with a meniscus injury. On his return, he delivered his first Lens assist in the 34th matchday fixture against Paris Saint-Germain at the Parc des Princes, setting up Corentin Jean with a precise cross in the final seconds to earn a 1–1 draw for a ten-man Lens side. He finished the campaign with 22 league appearances as Lens ended the season seventh in Ligue 1.

Machado began the 2022–23 Ligue 1 season in emphatic form, opening his Lens goalscoring account in only the third matchday with a powerful cross-shot against Monaco, contributing to a 4–1 away victory. He scored two further important goals during the second half of the campaign — at Lyon (matchday 23, 2–1) and against Nantes at Bollaert-Delelis (matchday 24, 3–1) — and assisted Loïs Openda against Monaco on matchday 32 as Lens remained unbeaten across the final seven fixtures. He finished the season with 4 goals and 3 assists in 33 Ligue 1 matches, as Lens reached second place with 84 points — the highest league finish in the club's history — and qualified for the UEFA Champions League for the first time.

On 31 January 2023, French newspaper Le Figaro reported that he had extended his contract with Lens until 2026, acknowledging his growing importance to the side.

Machado opened the 2023–24 Ligue 1 season with goals in each of Lens's first two matches — against Brest on 13 August (3–2 defeat) and against Stade Rennais on 20 August with a struck left-footed effort from outside the penalty area (1–1 draw). On 20 September 2023, Machado made his UEFA Champions League debut away at Sevilla, starting in the 1–1 draw at the Ramón Sánchez Pizjuán and recording two dribbles, six clearances and five tackles. He went on to appear in five of Lens's six Champions League group-stage fixtures, including the celebrated 2–1 home victory over Arsenal at Bollaert-Delelis, during which his recovery of possession directly led to Adrien Thomasson's equaliser. The second half of the season was disrupted by an adductor injury, but he returned to score against Montpellier (2–2) and contribute to Lens finishing seventh and qualifying for European football for a second consecutive year.

Machado began the 2024–25 Ligue 1 season under new head coach Will Still, adapting rapidly to the new tactical principles and completing 78.9% of his tackles and delivering 22 crosses from open play across the campaign. In the first half of the season he scored a header at Le Havre (matchday 17, 1–2) from a Przemysław Frankowski cross, providing Lens with three valuable points. He also appeared in the 2024–25 UEFA Europa Conference League, Lens's second successive European campaign.

On 26 January 2025, Machado made his 100th appearance for Lens in the 1–0 home win against Angers, coming on as a substitute in the second half to replace the injured Florian Sotoca. The club presented him with a personalised shirt bearing the number 100 after the final whistle, and the RC Lens official release noted that the milestone made Lens the club for which he had made the most appearances, surpassing his 91 matches at Millonarios. In the second half of the season, he contributed assists against Saint-Étienne (1–0) and Marseille (0–1 away) as Lens climbed the table under coach Pierre Sage.

=== Nantes ===
On 8 December 2025, FC Nantes announced that Machado had joined the club from Lens on a permanent transfer, signing a contract until June 2028. The RC Lens farewell statement noted that he departed with 117 total appearances for the club, having been a key contributor to two European qualification campaigns including one in the UEFA Champions League. The Ligue 1 official website described him as a mid-season reinforcement on the left side of defence and highlighted his record of more than 100 Ligue 1 appearances. The transfer fee was reported to be around €500,000.

Machado made his debut for Nantes on 12 December 2025, starting from the first minute in a 4–1 Ligue 1 away defeat against Angers at the Stade Raymond Kopa, playing 80 minutes in his first appearance for the club. He went on to make 21 total appearances for Nantes across all competitions during the 2025–26 season.

== International career ==
Machado was named in the Colombia national team's provisional squad for Copa América Centenario but was cut from the final squad.

On 25 May 2026, he was named in head coach Néstor Lorenzo's final 26-man squad for the 2026 FIFA World Cup. He made his FIFA World Cup debut as a starter on 27 June in a goalless draw against Portugal, making his first appearance at the tournament.

== Career statistics ==
=== Club ===
As of match played 22 November 2026

Appearances and goals by club, season and competition
Club	Season	League			National cup		Continental		Other		Total	
Club	Season	Division	Apps	Goals	Apps	Goals	Apps	Goals	Apps	Goals	Apps	Goals
Atlético Nacional	2013	Categoría Primera A	2	0	—		—		—		2	0
Alianza Petrolera (loan)	2014	Categoría Primera A	24	0	4	0	—		—		28	0
Millonarios	2015	Categoría Primera A	32	0	2	0	—		—		34	0
Millonarios	2016	Categoría Primera A	29	2	2	0	—		—		31	2
Millonarios	2017	Categoría Primera A	24	2	0	0	2 (Note: Appearances in Copa Libertadores)	0	—		26	2
Millonarios	Total		85	4	4	0	2	0	—		91	4
Gent	2017	Belgian First Division A	12	0	3	0	0	0	—		15	0
Atlético Nacional	2018	Categoría Primera A	14	0	4	0	2 (Note: Appearances in Copa Sudamericana)	0	—		20	0
Atlético Nacional	2019	Categoría Primera A	19	0	0	0	6 (Note: Four appearances in Copa Libertadores, two appearances in Copa Sudamericana)	0	—		25	0
Atlético Nacional	Total		32	0	4	0	8	0	—		45	0
Toulouse	2020–21	Ligue 2	32	1	0	0	—		3 (Note: Appearances in Ligue 1 relegation/promotion play-offs)	1	35	2
Lens	2021–22	Ligue 1	22	0	—		—		—		22	0
Lens	2022–23	Ligue 1	33	4	3	0	—		—		36	4
Lens	2023–24	Ligue 1	18	4	0	0	4 (Note: Appearances in UEFA Champions League)	0	—		22	4
Lens	2024–25	Ligue 1	27	1	1	0	2 (Note: Appearances in UEFA Europa League)	0	—		30	1
Lens	2025–26	Ligue 1	5	0	0	0	—		—		5	0
Lens	Total		105	9	4	0	6	0	0	0	115	5
Nantes	2025–26	Ligue 1	14	0	2	0	—		—		16	0
Rodina Moscow	2026–27	Russian Premier League	7	1	0	0	—		—		7	1
Career total			314	15	21	0	16	0	3	1	354	16

=== International ===
As of match played 27 June 2026

Appearances and goals by national team and year
National team	Year	Apps	Goals
Colombia	2018	2	0
Colombia	2019	1	0
Colombia	2020	0	0
Colombia	2021	0	0
Colombia	2022	0	0
Colombia	2023	6	0
Colombia	2024	2	0
Colombia	2025	1	0
Colombia	2026	4	0
Total		16	0

== Honours ==
Millonarios

- Liga DIMAYOR: 2017 Finalización

Atlético Nacional

- Copa Colombia: 2018
