= David Da Costa (footballer, born 2001) =

Portuguese footballer (born 2001)

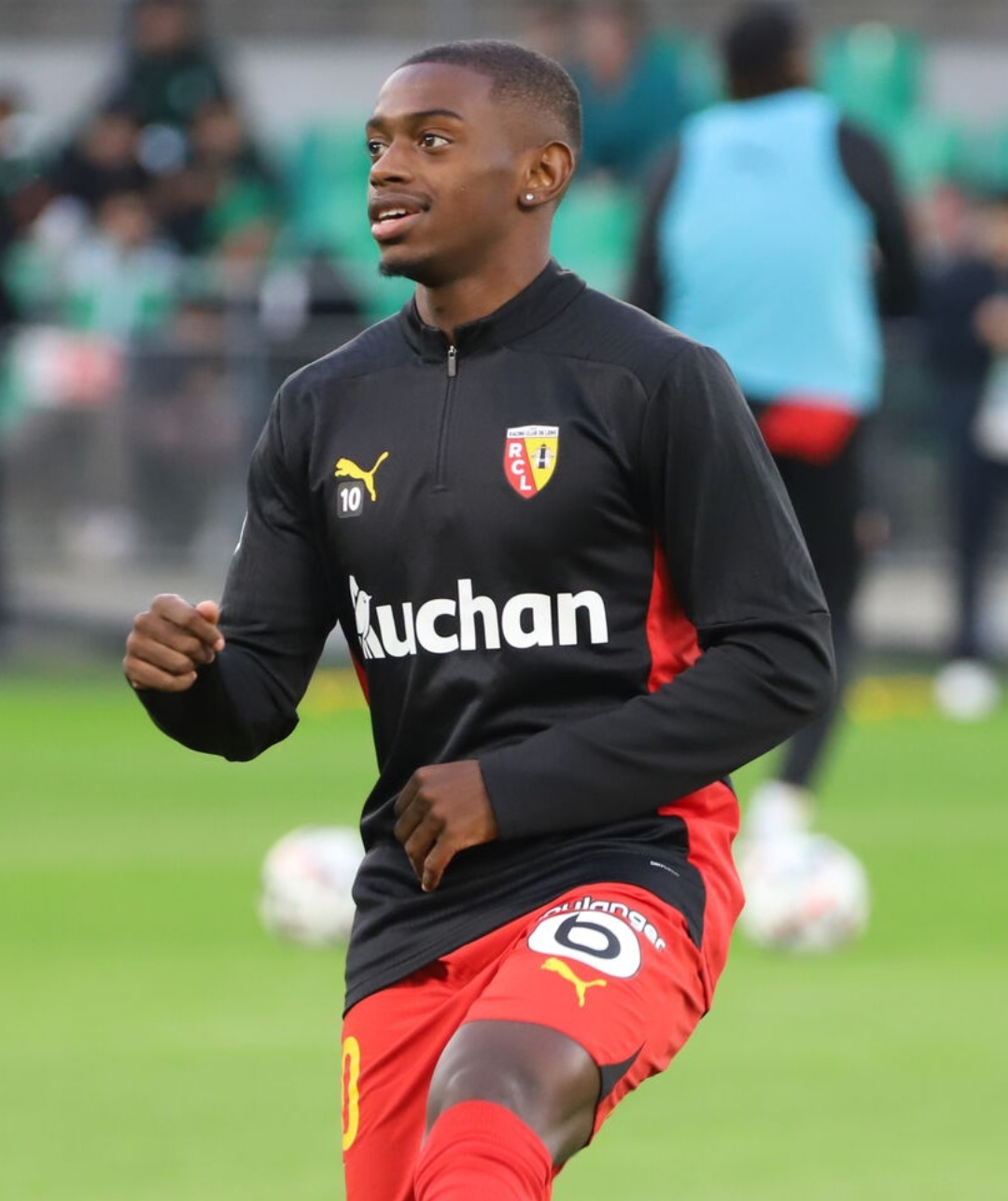
- Da Costa with Lens in 2024

Personal information
- Full name: David Pereira da Costa
- Date of birth: 5 January 2001 (age 25)
- Place of birth: Almada, Portugal
- Height: 1.68 m (5 ft 6 in)
- Positions: Attacking midfielder; winger

Team information
- Current team: Portland Timbers
- Number: 10

Youth career
- 2013–2019: Lens

Senior career*
Years	Team	Apps	(Gls)
2019–2023	Lens II	22	(1)
2020–2025	Lens	107	(9)
2025–	Portland Timbers	50	(11)

International career^{‡}
2019	Portugal U18	4	(0)
2020	Portugal U19	1	(1)
2022–2023	Portugal U21	6	(1)
- * Club domestic league appearances and goals as of 21:52, 13 July 2026 (UTC) ‡ National team caps and goals as of 02:16, 11 November 2023 (UTC)

David Pereira da Costa (born 5 January 2001), sometimes known as David Da Costa, is a Portuguese professional footballer who plays as an attacking midfielder or winger for Major League Soccer club Portland Timbers.

== Early life ==
Born in Almada, Portugal as one of six children, Costa moved to France at the age of 9.

== Club career ==
On 10 January 2019, Costa signed his first professional contract with Lens. He made his professional debut in a 2–0 Ligue 1 win over Saint-Étienne on 3 October 2020. He scored his first goal on 3 March 2021 against Saint-Étienne.

On 23 June 2021, Costa extended his contract with Lens to 2024.

=== Portland Timbers ===
On 17 February 2025, Da Costa transferred to Major League Soccer side Portland Timbers on a four-year Designated Player contract for a reported transfer fee of $6 million. He integrated rapidly into the Timbers' midfield, making 37 regular-season appearances and recording four goals and six assists during his debut 2025 campaign. His immediate high-level performance earned him a selection to the 2025 MLS All-Star Game. Following the conclusion of his first year, he underwent successful surgery to repair a shoulder injury sustained late in the season.

Da Costa returned fully healthy as the club's starting playmaker for the 2026 MLS regular season, elevating his offensive numbers under head coach Martí Cifuentes to register 7 goals and 9 assists across 30 appearances. He proved essential during Portland's late-autumn playoff qualification run, executing a stretch of consecutive match-winning offensive contributions. This included an assist and a goal in a 3–2 away victory over St. Louis City SC on 28 October, followed by another goal and assist performance in a 3–1 triumph against Houston Dynamo FC on 1 November to officially secure the franchise's spot in the postseason.

== International career ==
Born in Portugal, Costa is of Cape Verdean descent. He is a youth international for Portugal, having played up to the Portugal U21s.

== Career statistics ==
As of match played 18 January 2025

Appearances and goals by club, season and competition
Club	Season	League			National cup		Continental		Total	
Club	Season	Division	Apps	Goals	Apps	Goals	Apps	Goals	Apps	Goals
Lens II	2018–19	Championnat National 2	1	0	—		—		1	0
Lens II	2019–20	Championnat National 2	14	0	—		—		14	0
Lens II	2020–21	Championnat National 2	4	0	—		—		4	0
Lens II	2021–22	Championnat National 2	2	1	—		—		2	1
Lens II	2022–23	Championnat National 3	0	0	—		—		0	0
Lens II	2023–24	Championnat National 3	1	0	—		—		1	0
Lens II	Total		22	1	—		—		22	1
Lens	2020–21	Ligue 1	7	1	1	0	—		8	1
Lens	2021–22	Ligue 1	33	3	3	0	—		36	3
Lens	2022–23	Ligue 1	31	1	3	0	—		34	1
Lens	2023–24	Ligue 1	25	4	1	0	5 (Note: Three appearance in UEFA Champions League, two appearances and one goal in UEFA Europa League)	1	31	5
Lens	2024–25	Ligue 1	11	0	1	0	2 (Note: Appearances in UEFA Europa League)	0	14	0
Lens	Total		107	9	9	0	7	1	123	10
Career total			129	10	9	0	7	1	145	11
