= Wesley Saïd =

French footballer (born 1995)

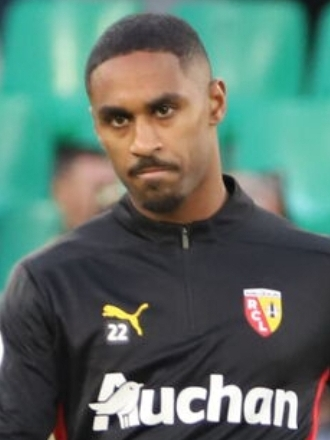
- Saïd with Lens in 2024

Personal information
- Full name: Wesley Alain Bernard Saïd
- Date of birth: 19 April 1995 (age 31)
- Place of birth: Noisy-le-Grand, France
- Height: 1.71 m (5 ft 7 in)
- Position: Winger

Team information
- Current team: Al-Shamal
- Number: 22

Youth career
- 2001–2004: Noisy-le-Grand
- 2004–2006: Villiers-sur-Marne
- 2006–2013: Rennes

Senior career*
Years	Team	Apps	(Gls)
2012–2014	Rennes B	26	(10)
2013–2017	Rennes	32	(4)
2014	→ Laval B (loan)	1	(1)
2014–2015	→ Laval (loan)	30	(4)
2015–2016	→ Dijon (loan)	9	(1)
2015–2016	→ Dijon B (loan)	2	(0)
2017–2019	Dijon	63	(13)
2019–2021	Toulouse	23	(2)
2021–2026	Lens	122	(32)
2026–	Al-Shamal	0	(0)

International career
2011	France U16	11	(9)
2011–2012	France U17	8	(2)
2012–2013	France U18	4	(2)
2013	France U19	6	(0)
2014–2015	France U20	8	(0)
2016	France U21	1	(0)
- * Club domestic league appearances and goals as of 17 May 2026

Wesley Alain Bernard Saïd (born 19 April 1995) is a French professional footballer who plays as a winger for Qatar Stars League club Al-Shamal. He is a former France youth international, having represented his country from under-16 to under-21 level.

== Club career ==
=== Rennes ===
Born in Noisy-le-Grand, Saïd is a youth exponent of Rennes. He made his Ligue 1 debut at 31 August 2013 against Lille in a goalless draw at Stade de la Route de Lorient starting in the first eleven and was substituted for Jonathan Pitroipa after 73 minutes.

He was loaned to Laval for the 2014–15 season on the last day of the transfer window.

Saïd was loaned to Ligue 2 side Dijon for the 2015–16 season.

=== Dijon ===
In July 2017, Saïd signed a four-year contract with Dijon. The transfer fee paid to Rennes was reported as €1.5 million with a possible €500,000 more in bonuses and a 20% sell-on clause.

=== Toulouse ===
On 3 August 2019, Toulouse announced the signing of Saïd on a four-year deal.

=== Lens ===
On 22 June 2021, Saïd signed a four-year contract with Ligue 1 club Lens. On 17 January 2023, he extended his contract with Lens until 2026.

== International career ==
Born in France to a Réunionnais father (of Comorian descent) and a Mauritian mother Saïd is a former France youth international.

== Career statistics ==
As of match played 22 May 2026

Appearances and goals by club, season and competition
Club	Season	League			Coupe de France		Coupe de la Ligue		Europe		Other		Total	
Club	Season	Division	Apps	Goals	Apps	Goals	Apps	Goals	Apps	Goals	Apps	Goals	Apps	Goals
Rennes B	2012–13	CFA 2	15	5	—		—		—		—		15	5
Rennes B	2013–14	CFA 2	11	5	—		—		—		—		11	5
Rennes B	Total		26	10	—		—		—		—		26	10
Rennes	2013–14	Ligue 1	6	0	1	0	2	0	—		—		9	0
Rennes	2015–16	Ligue 1	1	0	0	0	0	0	—		—		1	0
Rennes	2016–17	Ligue 1	25	4	2	1	2	1	—		—		29	6
Rennes	Total		32	4	3	1	4	1	—		—		39	6
Laval B (loan)	2014–15	CFA 2	1	1	—		—		—		—		1	1
Laval (loan)	2014–15	Ligue 2	30	4	2	1	1	0	—		—		33	5
Dijon (loan)	2015–16	Ligue 2	9	1	0	0	1	0	—		—		10	1
Dijon B (loan)	2015–16	CFA 2	2	0	—		—		—		—		2	0
Dijon	2017–18	Ligue 1	29	9	1	0	1	0	—		—		31	9
Dijon	2018–19	Ligue 1	34	4	4	1	2	2	—		2 (Note: Appearances in Ligue 1 relegation/promotion play-offs)	1	42	8
Dijon	Total		63	13	5	1	3	2	—		2	1	73	17
Toulouse	2019–20	Ligue 1	23	2	0	0	1	0	—		—		24	2
Toulouse	2020–21	Ligue 2	0	0	1	0	—		—		0	0	1	0
Toulouse	Total		23	2	1	0	1	0	—		0	0	25	2
Lens	2021–22	Ligue 1	21	5	2	1	—		—		—		23	6
Lens	2022–23	Ligue 1	21	5	1	1	—		—		—		22	6
Lens	2023–24	Ligue 1	27	7	1	0	—		5 (Note: Three appearances in UEFA Champions League, two appearances in UEFA Europa League)	0	—		33	7
Lens	2024–25	Ligue 1	24	3	0	0	—		2 (Note: Appearances in UEFA Europa League)	1	—		26	4
Lens	2025–26	Ligue 1	29	12	5	0	—		—		—		34	12
Lens	Total		122	32	9	2	—		7	1	—		138	35
Career total			308	67	20	5	10	3	7	1	2	1	347	77

== Honours ==
Lens

- Coupe de France: 2025–26
