= Gradit =

Gradit is a surname. Notable people with the surname include:

- Jonathan Gradit (born 1992), French footballer
- William Gradit (born 1982), French basketball player
