= Jonathan Gradit =

French footballer (born 1992)

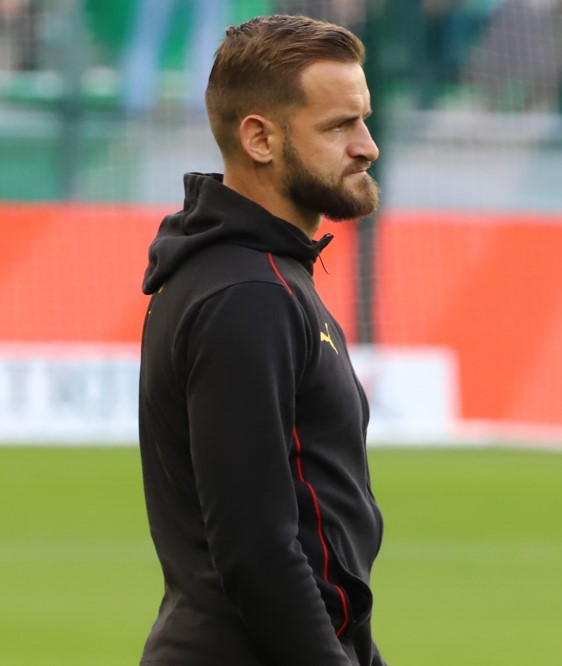
- Gradit in 2024

Personal information
- Date of birth: 24 November 1992 (age 33)
- Place of birth: Talence, France
- Height: 1.80 m (5 ft 11 in)
- Position: Centre-back

Team information
- Current team: Lens
- Number: 24

Senior career*
Years	Team	Apps	(Gls)
2011–2012	Bordeaux B	23	(0)
2012–2013	Bayonne	29	(2)
2013–2018	Tours B	14	(0)
2014–2018	Tours	132	(1)
2018–2019	Caen	26	(0)
2019	Caen B	1	(0)
2019–	Lens	176	(2)
- * Club domestic league appearances and goals as of 9 October 2026

Jonathan Gradit (born 24 November 1992) is a French professional footballer who plays as a centre-back for Ligue 1 club Lens.

== Career ==
Gradit made his Ligue 2 debut on 10 March 2014 with Tours against Angers in a 2–0 home win.

On 20 August 2019, he signed a two-year contract with Ligue 2 club RC Lens for an estimated amount of 400,000€. The contract was set to automatically be extended for one year in case Lens got promoted.

On 5 February 2023, he scored his first goal ever in Ligue 1 against Brest.

== Career statistics ==
As of match played 9 October 2026

Appearances and goals by club, season and competition
Club	Season	League			National cup		League cup		Continental		Other		Total	
Club	Season	Division	Apps	Goals	Apps	Goals	Apps	Goals	Apps	Goals	Apps	Goals	Apps	Goals
Bordeaux II	2011–12	CFA 2	23	0	—		—		—		—		23	0
Bayonnais	2012–13	CFA 2	29	2	—		—		—		—		29	2
Tours II	2013–14	National 3	13	0	—		—		—		—		13	0
Tours	2013–14	Ligue 2	12	0	0	0	0	0	—		—		12	0
Tours	2014–15	Ligue 2	31	0	3	0	1	0	—		—		35	0
Tours	2015–16	Ligue 2	34	0	2	0	4	0	—		—		40	0
Tours	2016–17	Ligue 2	31	0	1	0	1	0	—		—		33	0
Tours	2017–18	Ligue 2	24	1	0	0	2	0	—		—		26	1
Tours	Total		132	1	6	0	8	0	—		—		146	1
Caen II	2018–19	National 3	1	0	—		—		—		—		1	0
Caen	2018–19	Ligue 1	23	0	3	0	1	0	—		—		27	0
Caen	2019–20	Ligue 2	2	0	0	0	0	0	—		—		2	0
Caen	Total		25	0	3	0	1	0	—		—		29	0
Lens	2019–20	Ligue 2	11	0	1	0	1	0	—		—		13	0
Lens	2020–21	Ligue 1	33	0	1	0	—		—		—		34	0
Lens	2021–22	Ligue 1	35	0	2	0	—		—		—		37	0
Lens	2022–23	Ligue 1	33	1	4	0	—		—		—		37	1
Lens	2023–24	Ligue 1	26	1	0	0	—		8 (Note: Six appearances in UEFA Champions League, two appearances in UEFA Europa League)	0	—		34	1
Lens	2024–25	Ligue 1	25	0	0	0	—		2 (Note: Appearances in UEFA Europa League)	0	—		27	0
Lens	2025–26	Ligue 1	10	0	0	0	—		—		—		10	0
Lens	2026–27	Ligue 1	3	0	0	0	—		0	0	—		3	0
Lens	Total		176	2	8	0	1	0	10	0	—		195	2
Career total			399	5	17	0	10	0	10	0	0	0	436	5
