= Loïs Openda =

Belgian footballer (born 2000)

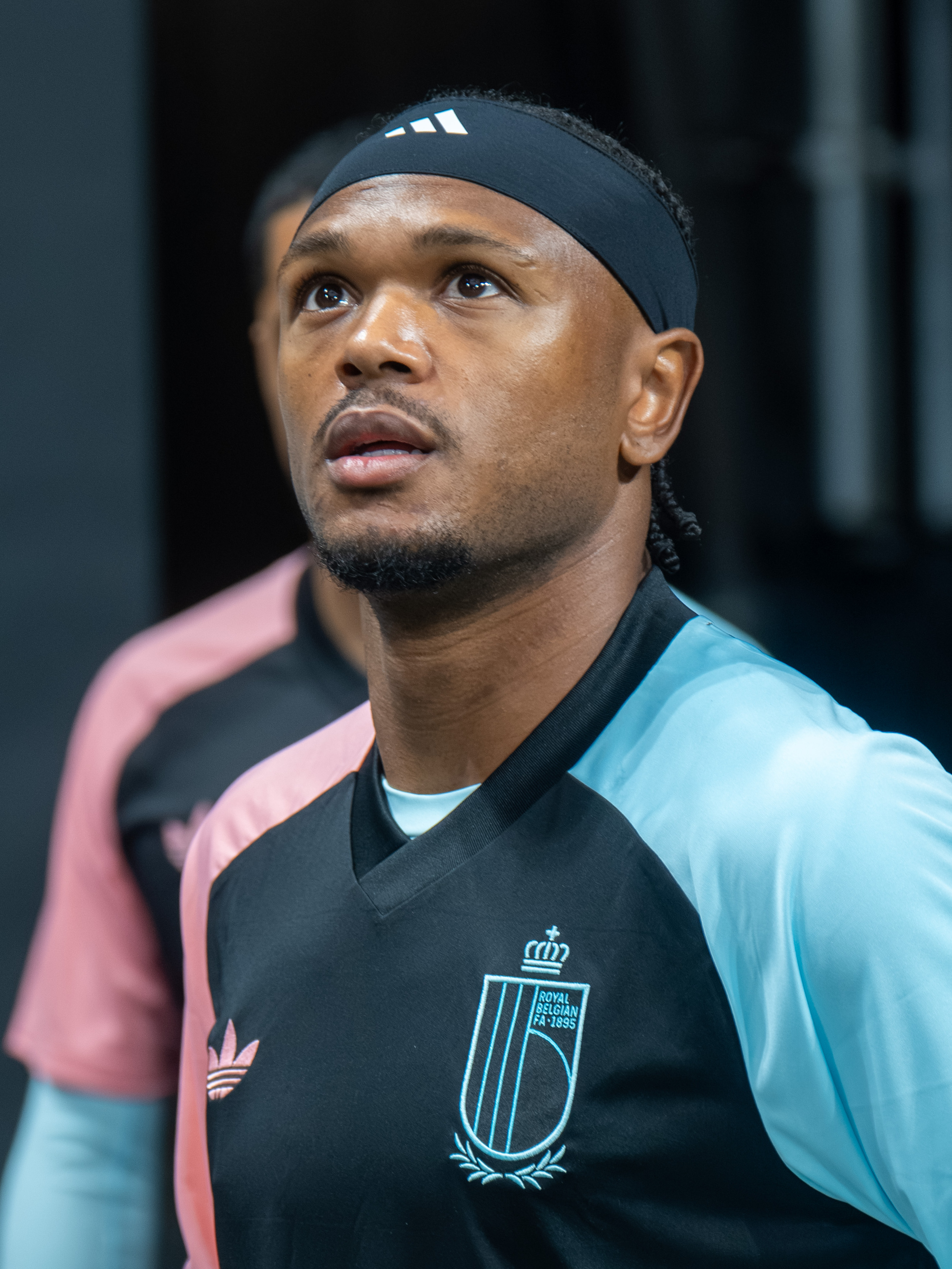
- Openda with Belgium in 2026

Personal information
- Full name: Ikoma-Loïs Openda
- Date of birth: 16 February 2000 (age 26)
- Place of birth: Liège, Belgium
- Height: 1.75 m (5 ft 9 in)
- Position: Striker

Team information
- Current team: Lyon (on loan from Juventus)
- Number: 17

Youth career
- 2008–2011: Patro Othee FC
- 2011–2013: RFC Liège
- 2013–2015: Standard Liège
- 2015–2018: Club Brugge

Senior career*
Years	Team	Apps	(Gls)
2018–2022	Club Brugge	35	(4)
2020–2022	→ Vitesse (loan)	66	(28)
2022–2023	Lens	38	(21)
2023–2026	RB Leipzig	69	(33)
2025–2026	→ Juventus (loan)	24	(1)
2026–	Juventus	0	(0)
2026–	→ Lyon (loan)	5	(1)

International career^{‡}
2015	Belgium U15	4	(0)
2015	Belgium U16	4	(3)
2016–2017	Belgium U17	17	(4)
2017	Belgium U18	6	(1)
2018–2019	Belgium U19	10	(7)
2019–2023	Belgium U21	18	(13)
2022–	Belgium	35	(3)
- * Club domestic league appearances and goals as of 22:30, 9 October 2026 (UTC) ‡ National team caps and goals as of 15:50, 6 October 2026 (UTC)

Ikoma-Loïs Openda (born 16 February 2000) is a Belgian professional footballer who plays as a striker for Ligue 1 club Lyon, on loan from Serie A club Juventus, and the Belgium national team.

== Club career ==
=== Early career ===
Openda played as a youth for Patro Othee FC and RFC Liège before joining the youth academy of Standard Liège.

=== Club Brugge ===
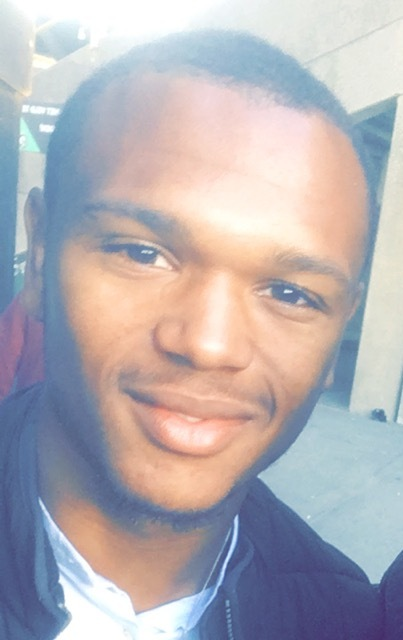
Openda pictured with a fan during his time at Club Brugge.

In 2015, he moved to the academy of Club Brugge, where he made his senior debut on 10 August 2018 in the Belgian Pro League against Kortrijk. Openda replaced Jelle Vossen after 80 minutes.

==== Loan to Vitesse ====
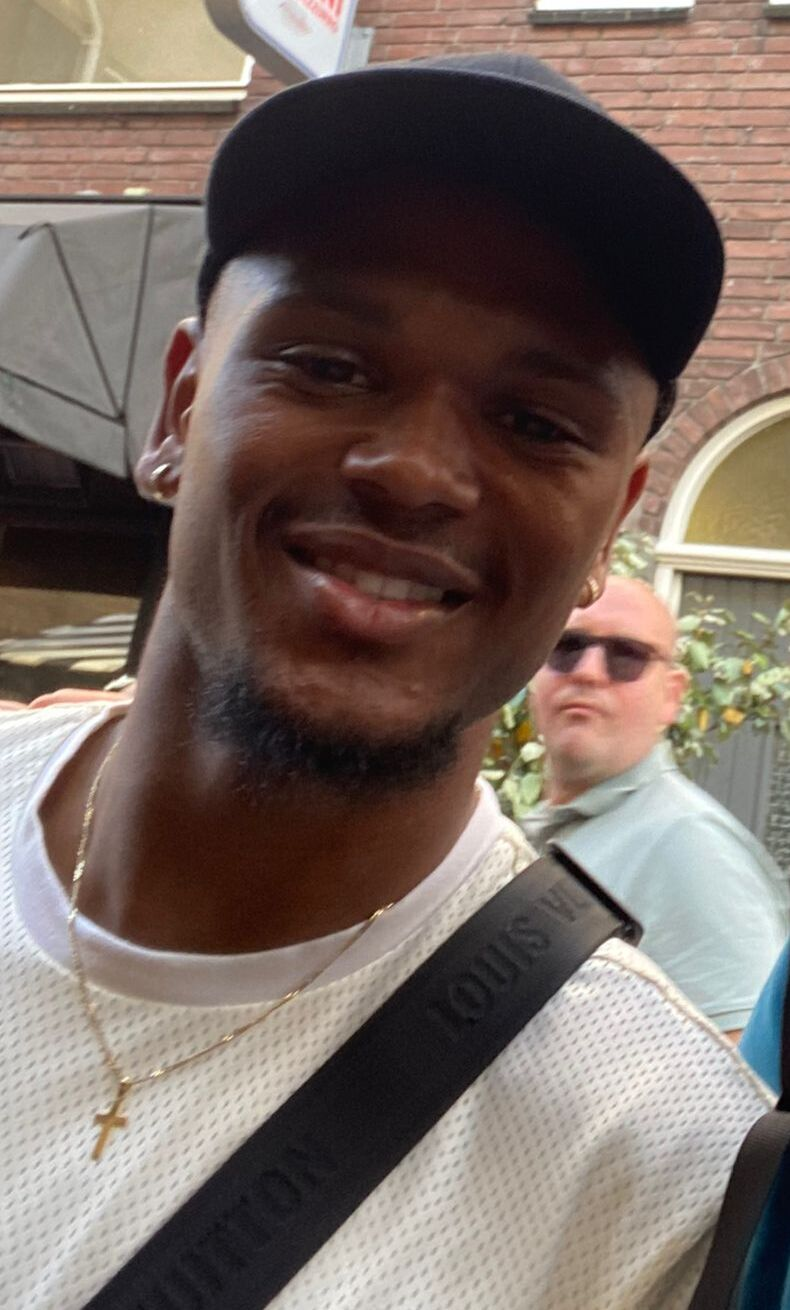
Openda pictured with a fan during his time at Vitesse.

On 21 July 2020, Openda joined Dutch Eredivisie club Vitesse on a season-long loan deal. He scored his first goal for the club on 3 October, in a 3–0 win over Heracles Almelo. Vitesse reached the final of the KNVB Cup, but lost 2–1 to Ajax. Openda scored the only goal for the Arnhem-based team. In June 2021, Openda rejoined Vitesse on loan for another season.

=== Lens ===
On 6 July 2022, Lens announced the signing of Openda on a five-year deal from Club Brugge. The striker scored his first goal against Inter Milan in a friendly game on 22 July. On 28 October, he scored his first hat-trick for Lens in a 3–0 win over Toulouse. After eight matches without scoring, on 12 March 2023, he scored the fastest hat-trick in Ligue 1 within four minutes and 30 seconds in a 4–0 away win over Clermont, beating the previous record held by Matt Moussilou.

=== RB Leipzig ===
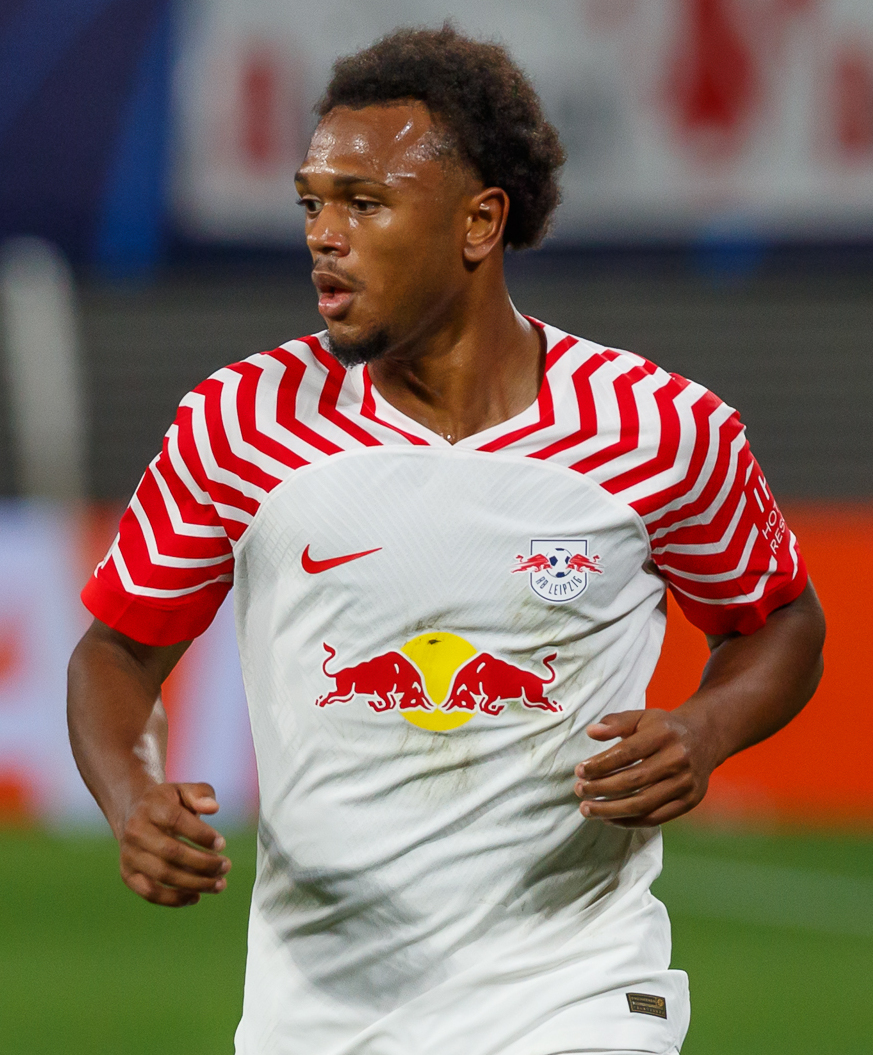
Openda playing for RB Leipzig in 2023.

On 14 July 2023, Openda signed for Bundesliga club RB Leipzig on a five-year contract. The transfer fee reported was in the region of €43 to €46 million, with potential bonuses adding up to €6 million. On 19 August, he scored his first goal on his Bundesliga debut in a 3–2 defeat against Bayer Leverkusen. On 4 October, he netted his first Champions League goal in a 1–3 home defeat against Manchester City. On 28 November, Openda scored twice at the City of Manchester Stadium against Manchester City, although his team lost 3–2. He finished his debut Bundesliga season at the club as their top scorer with 24 goals, only behind Harry Kane and Serhou Guirassy in the league.

On 31 August 2024, Openda scored two goals against Bayer Leverkusen in a 3–2 away victory to end their unbeaten Bundesliga streak for the first time in 15 months.

=== Juventus ===
On 1 September 2025, Openda signed for Serie A club Juventus on an initial loan deal worth €3.3 million, with an obligation to buy for €40.6 million, depending on certain conditions. Later that year, on 25 November, he scored his first goal for Juventus in a Champions League match, netting in a 3–2 away victory against Bodø/Glimt. A month later, on 20 December, Openda scored his first Serie A goal in a 2–1 victory over Roma.

In April 2026, the obligation to buy included in the agreement between Juventus and RB Leipzig was activated after Juventus secured a mathematical top-half finish in the Serie A standings, triggering the permanent transfer for a reported fee of €40 million.

==== Loan to Lyon ====
On 28 July 2026, Openda joined Olympique Lyonnais on loan until the end of the season, with Lyon paying a €3.5 million loan fee.

== International career ==
On 18 May 2022, Openda was named to the squad for the four 2022–23 UEFA Nations League matches on 3, 8, 10 and 13 June 2022 against Netherlands, Poland (twice) and Wales respectively. He played again against Wales in the UEFA Nations League on 13 September 2022.

On 10 November 2022, he was named in the final squad for the 2022 FIFA World Cup in Qatar.

== Style of play ==
Openda is a versatile forward who primarily plays as a central striker, though he is also capable of operating across both flanks due to his background as a winger. Known for his explosive pace and acceleration, he frequently exploits high defensive lines and thrives in quick-transition or counter-attacking systems. His low center of gravity allows him to maintain balance while driving at defenders or making overlapping runs into wide spaces to stretch opposing backlines.

Tactical analyses highlight Openda's high volume of shooting and intelligent off-the-ball movement, particularly his ability to drift wide to create space for midfield runners or a secondary strike partner. While noted for his directness and progressive carries rather than a deeper playmaking or possession-heavy build-up role, he contributes to the defensive phase through an active counter-pressing work rate, frequently winning duels and drawing fouls in advanced areas. Although relatively undersized for a traditional target man, he possesses a strong aerial leap and has scored a portion of his goals from headers through positional anticipation inside the penalty area.

== Personal life ==
Born in Belgium, Openda is of Moroccan and Congolese descent.

== Career statistics ==
=== Club ===
As of match played 9 October 2026

Appearances and goals by club, season and competition
Club	Season	League			National cup (Note: Includes Belgian Cup, KNVB Cup, Coupe de France, DFB-Pokal, Coppa Italia)		Europe		Other		Total	
Club	Season	Division	Apps	Goals	Apps	Goals	Apps	Goals	Apps	Goals	Apps	Goals
Club Brugge	2018–19	Belgian Pro League	20	4	1	0	7 (Note: Five appearances in UEFA Champions League, two appearances in UEFA Europa League)	0	—		28	4
Club Brugge	2019–20	Belgian Pro League	15	0	3	0	7 (Note: Appearances in UEFA Champions League)	1	—		25	1
Club Brugge	Total		35	4	4	0	14	1	—		53	5
Vitesse (loan)	2020–21	Eredivisie	33	10	5	3	—		—		38	13
Vitesse (loan)	2021–22	Eredivisie	33	18	2	1	11 (Note: Appearances in UEFA Europa Conference League)	4	4 (Note: Appearances in Eredivisie European play-offs)	1	50	24
Vitesse (loan)	Total		66	28	7	4	11	4	4	1	88	37
Lens	2022–23	Ligue 1	38	21	4	0	—		—		42	21
RB Leipzig	2023–24	Bundesliga	34	24	1	0	8	4	1 (Note: Appearance in DFL-Supercup)	0	44	28
RB Leipzig	2024–25	Bundesliga	33	9	4	3	8	1	—		45	13
RB Leipzig	2025–26	Bundesliga	2	0	1	0	—		—		3	0
RB Leipzig	Total		69	33	6	3	16	5	1	0	93	41
Juventus (loan)	2025–26	Serie A	24	1	2	0	8	1	—		34	2
Lyon (loan)	2026–27	Ligue 1	5	1	0	0	5 (Note: Four appearances and one goal in UEFA Champions League, one appearance in UEFA Europa League)	1	—		10	2
Career total			237	88	23	7	54	12	5	1	320	108

=== International ===
As of match played 5 October 2026

Appearances and goals by national team and year
National team	Year	Apps	Goals
Belgium	2022	6	2
Belgium	2023	8	0
Belgium	2024	12	1
Belgium	2025	5	0
Belgium	2026	4	0
Total		35	3

Scores and results list Belgium's goal tally first.

List of international goals scored by Loïs Openda
No.	Date	Venue	Opponent	Score	Result	Competition	Ref.
1	8 June 2022	King Baudouin Stadium, Brussels, Belgium	Poland	6–1	6–1	2022–23 UEFA Nations League A	
2	18 November 2022	Jaber Al-Ahmad International Stadium, Kuwait City, Kuwait	Egypt	1–2	1–2	Friendly	
3	14 October 2024	King Baudouin Stadium, Brussels, Belgium	France	1–1	1–2	2024–25 UEFA Nations League A	

== Honours ==
Club Brugge

- Belgian Pro League: 2019–20
- Belgian Super Cup: 2018

RB Leipzig

- DFL-Supercup: 2023

Individual

- Eredivisie Player of the Month: May 2022
- UNFP Ligue 1 Player of the Month: March 2023, April 2023
- UNFP Ligue 1 Team of the Year: 2022–23
