= Mamadou Camara (footballer, born 2002) =

French footballer (born 2002)

Personal information
- Date of birth: 15 October 2002 (age 24)
- Place of birth: Dakar, Senegal
- Height: 1.85 m (6 ft 1 in)
- Position: Midfielder

Team information
- Current team: Mladost DG (on loan from Sutjeska)

Youth career
- 2017–2021: Dakar Sacré-Cœur

Senior career*
Years	Team	Apps	(Gls)
2020–2021	Dakar Sacré-Cœur	12	(1)
2021–2025	Lens II	42	(4)
2022–2024	Lens	0	(0)
2022–2023	→ Bastia (loan)	6	(0)
2023–2024	→ Nancy (loan)	8	(0)
2023–2024	→ Nancy II (loan)	3	(0)
2025–	Sutjeska	9	(0)
2026–	→ Mladost DG ( loan)	13	(1)

International career^{‡}
2022	Senegal U23	2	(2)
- * Club domestic league appearances and goals as of 17 June 2026 ‡ National team caps and goals as of 00:58, 9 June 2023 (UTC)

Mamadou "Koto" Camara (born 15 October 2002) is a Senegalese professional footballer who plays as a midfielder for Montenegrin First League club Mladost DG, on loan from Sutjeska.

== Club career ==
A youth product of the Senegalese club Dakar Sacré-Cœur, Camara began his senior career with them in 2021 making 12 appearances and scoring a goal.

He moved to France with Lens in July 2021 signing a three-year contract, and began his career with their reserves. He moved to the Ligue 2 club Bastia on 1 September 2022. He made his professional debut with Bastia in a 1–0 Ligue 2 win over FC Metz on 17 September 2022. On 1 February 2023, he cut his loan short with Bastia and returned to Lens.

== International career ==
Camara is a youth international for Senegal, having played for the Senegal U23s.
