= Ismaël Boura =

Footballer (born 2000)

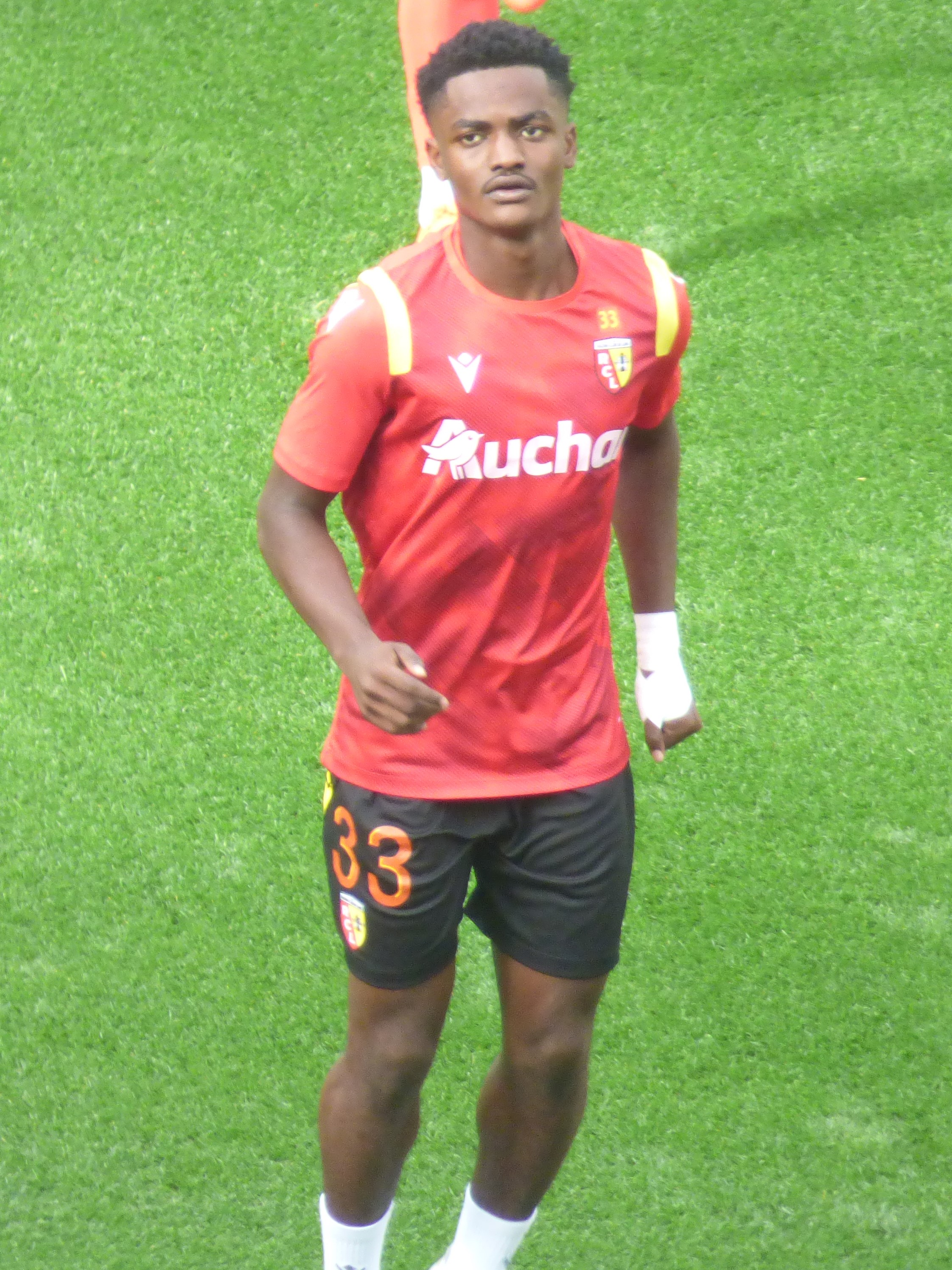
- Boura with Lens in 2020

Personal information
- Full name: Ismaël Ben Boura
- Date of birth: 14 August 2000 (age 26)
- Place of birth: Bandrele, France
- Height: 1.73 m (5 ft 8 in)
- Position: Left back

Team information
- Current team: Troyes
- Number: 14

Youth career
- 2014–2020: Lens

Senior career*
Years	Team	Apps	(Gls)
2017–2023	Lens B	56	(4)
2020–2023	Lens	34	(0)
2021–2022	→ Le Havre (loan)	16	(1)
2023–	Troyes	88	(1)

International career^{‡}
2024–	Comoros	1	(0)
- * Club domestic league appearances and goals as of 11 May 2026 ‡ National team caps and goals as of 25 March 2024

Ismaël Ben Boura (born 14 August 2000) is a professional footballer who plays as a left back for Ligue 1 club Troyes. Born in France, he plays for the Comoros national team.

== Career ==
Having been raised in the Lens youth system, Boura made his professional debut on 23 August 2020, for the Pas-de-Calaisiens' first game back in Ligue 1, starting the match against Nice. Boura was loaned to Ligue 2 club Le Havre in 2021.

In June 2023, Boura signed for Troyes on a two-year contract, following the expiration of his Lens contract.

On 11 December 2025, Boura was called up to the Comoros squad for the 2025 Africa Cup of Nations.

== Personal life ==
Born in France, Boura is of Comorian and Malagasy descent. He was called up to the Comoros national team in August 2023.
