= Ibrahima Baldé (footballer, born 2003) =

French footballer (born 2003)

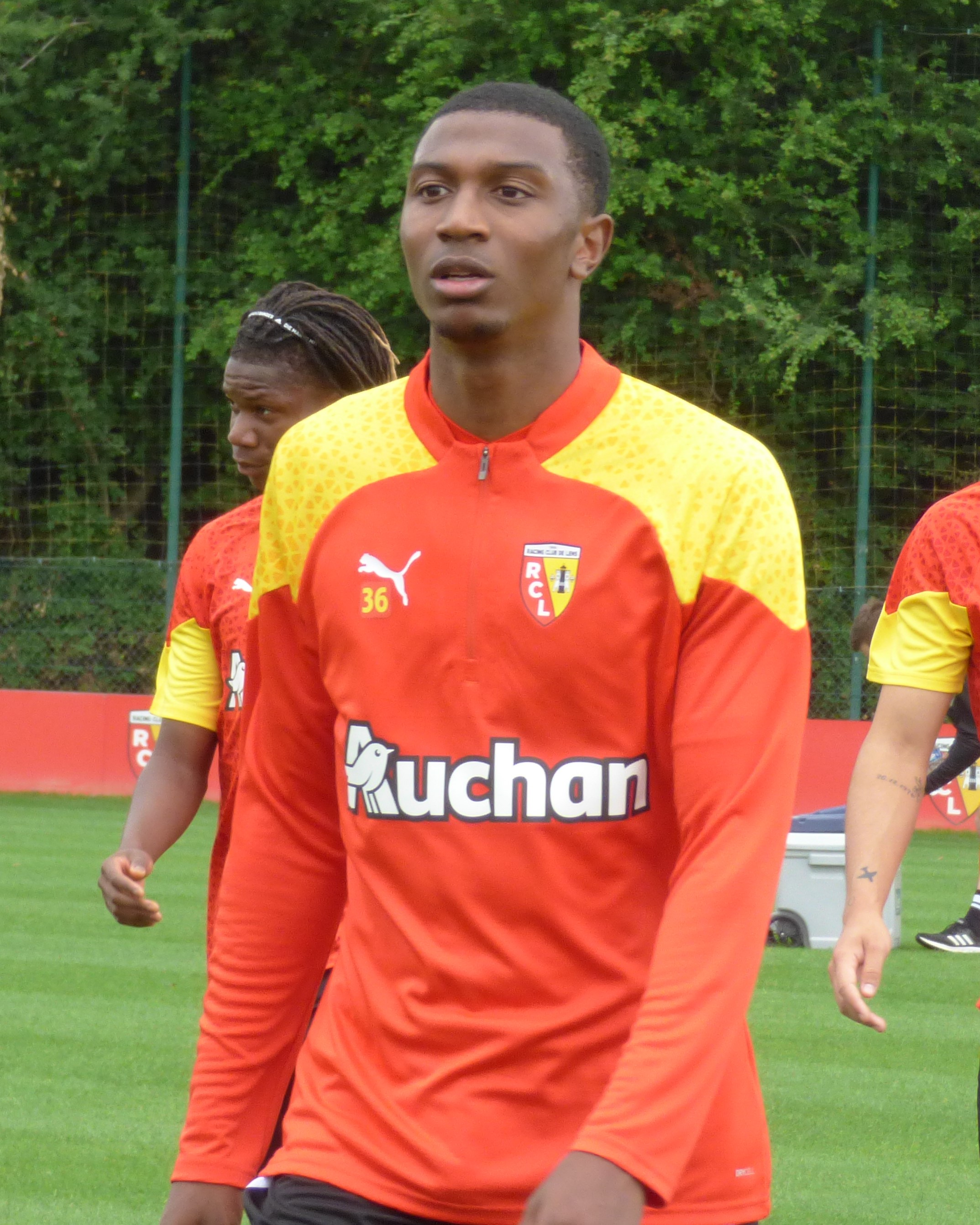
- Baldé in 2023

Personal information
- Date of birth: 17 January 2003 (age 23)
- Place of birth: Paris, France
- Height: 1.85 m (6 ft 1 in)
- Position: Forward

Team information
- Current team: Lorient (on loan from Rodez)
- Number: 18

Youth career
- 2011–2012: Montmartre SPO
- 2012–2018: Red Star
- 2018–2020: Lens

Senior career*
Years	Team	Apps	(Gls)
2020–2024	Lens B	16	(3)
2021–2024	Lens	4	(0)
2022–2023	→ Annecy (loan)	20	(2)
2024–	Rodez	65	(24)
2026–	→ Lorient (loan)	0	(0)

International career^{‡}
2019	France U17	1	(0)
- * Club domestic league appearances and goals as of 28 August 2026 ‡ National team caps and goals as of 21:35, 1 February 2023 (UTC)

Ibrahima Baldé (born 17 January 2003) is a French professional footballer who plays as a forward for Ligue 1 club Lorient, on loan from Rodez.

== Career ==
A youth product of Montmartre SPO, and Red Star, Baldé joined the youth academy of Lens in 2018. He signed his first professional contract with the club on 1 July 2021. He made his professional debut with Lens in a 4–0 Ligue 1 loss to Brest on 21 November 2021, coming on as a late sub in the 73rd minute.

On 11 August 2022, Baldé joined Annecy in Ligue 2 on loan.

== Personal life ==
Baldé holds French and Senegalese nationalities. He is the brother of the retired footballer Abdoulaye Baldé.
