= Adrien Louveau =

French footballer (born 2000)

Personal information
- Date of birth: 1 February 2000 (age 26)
- Place of birth: Lille, France
- Height: 1.89 m (6 ft 2 in)
- Position: Defender

Team information
- Current team: Créteil
- Number: 24

Youth career
- 2009–2019: Lens

Senior career*
Years	Team	Apps	(Gls)
2019–2023	Lens II	43	(3)
2020–2023	Lens	1	(0)
2023–2024	ŁKS Łódź	25	(1)
2023–2024	ŁKS Łódź II	4	(0)
2024–2025	Bordeaux	26	(1)
2025–	Créteil	18	(0)
- * Club domestic league appearances and goals as of 13 February 2026

Adrien Louveau (born 1 February 2000) is a French professional footballer who plays as a defender for National 2 club Créteil.

== Career ==
Adrien Louveau arrived in RC Lens as a youngster in 2009, signing his first professional contract in March 2021, after having already figured several times in the first team squad.

He made his professional debut for Lens on 18 April 2021, coming on as an 83rd-minute substitute of Gaël Kakuta in the 1–1 Ligue 1 away draw against Brest.

On 13 July 2023, Louveau joined Polish Ekstraklasa side ŁKS Łódź on a two-year contract.

On 29 August 2024, he returned to France to join Bordeaux, recently demoted to Championnat National 2.
