= 2018–19 Toulouse FC season =

Toulouse
2018–19 season
- Chairman: Olivier Sadran
- Manager: Alain Casanova
- Stadium: Stadium Municipal
- Ligue 1: 16th
- Coupe de France: Round of 16
- Coupe de la Ligue: Round of 32
- Highest home attendance: League/All: 27,147 (31 March vs. PSG)
- Lowest home attendance: League: 10,279 (2 December vs. Dijon); All: 6,652 (22 January vs. Reims)
- Average home league attendance: 15,760
Home colours	Away colours	Third colours

The 2018–19 Toulouse FC season was the 48th professional season of the club since its creation in 1970.

== Players ==
Note: Flags indicate national team as defined under FIFA eligibility rules; some limited exceptions apply. Players may hold more than one non-FIFA nationality.

No.	Pos.	Nation	Player
1	GK	URU	Mauro Goicoechea
2	DF	FRA	Kelvin Amian
4	MF	FRA	Yannick Cahuzac
5	DF	FRA	Steven Moreira
6	DF	FRA	Christopher Jullien (vice-captain)
7	MF	CIV	Max-Alain Gradel (captain)
8	FW	FRA	Corentin Jean
9	FW	FRA	Yaya Sanogo
10	FW	BEL	Aaron Leya Iseka
12	DF	GUI	Issiaga Sylla
14	MF	TOG	Mathieu Dossevi
15	MF	TTO	John Bostock
16	GK	FRA	Marc Vidal
17	MF	CIV	Ibrahim Sangaré
18	DF	CPV	Steven Fortès

No.	Pos.	Nation	Player
20	DF	BFA	Steeve Yago
21	MF	SWE	Jimmy Durmaz
22	MF	ESP	Manu García (on loan from Manchester City)
23	MF	FRA	Yann Bodiger
24	FW	COD	Firmin Ndombe Mubele
25	DF	CMR	Stéphane Mbia
26	MF	FRA	Kalidou Sidibé
28	FW	FRA	Hakim El Mokeddem
29	DF	SUI	François Moubandje
30	GK	FRA	Baptiste Reynet
31	FW	FRA	Derick Oseï Yaw
33	MF	FRA	Jean-Clair Todibo
—	DF	FRA	Mathieu Goncalves
—	DF	JPN	Gen Shoji
—	FW	FRA	Adil Taoui

=== Out on loan ===
Note: Flags indicate national team as defined under FIFA eligibility rules; some limited exceptions apply. Players may hold more than one non-FIFA nationality.

No.	Pos.	Nation	Player
—	DF	FRA	Clément Michelin (on loan to Ajaccio)
—	MF	FRA	Quentin Boisgard (on loan to Pau)
—	MF	FRA	Alexis Blin (on loan to Amiens)

No.	Pos.	Nation	Player
—	MF	FRA	Jessy Pi (on loan to Brest)
—	FW	FRA	Andy Delort (on loan to Montpellier)

== Competitions ==
=== Ligue 1 ===
==== League table ====
Pos	Team	Pld	W	D	L	GF	GA	GD	Pts	Qualification or relegation
14	Bordeaux	38	10	11	17	34	42	−8	41	
15	Amiens	38	9	11	18	31	52	−21	38	
16	Toulouse	38	8	14	16	35	57	−22	38	
17	Monaco	38	8	12	18	38	57	−19	36	
18	Dijon (O)	38	9	7	22	31	60	−29	34	Qualification to Relegation play-offs

Source: Ligue 1 and Soccerway
Rules for classification: 1) Points; 2) Goal difference; 3) Head-to-head points; 4) Head-to-head goal difference; 5) Head-to-head goals scored; 6) Head-to-head away goals scored; 7) Goals scored; 8) Away goals scored; 9) Most goals scored in single league match; 10) Fairplay ranking.
(O) Play-off winners

==== Results summary ====
Overall								Home						Away					
Pld	W	D	L	GF	GA	GD	Pts	W	D	L	GF	GA	GD	W	D	L	GF	GA	GD
38	8	14	16	35	57	−22	38	4	9	6	20	26	−6	4	5	10	15	31	−16

Last updated: 24 May 2019.
Source: Competitive matches

==== Results by round ====
Round	1	2	3	4	5	6	7	8	9	10	11	12	13	14	15	16	17	18	19	20	21	22	23	24	25	26	27	28	29	30	31	32	33	34	35	36	37	38
Ground	A	H	H	A	H	A	H	A	H	A	H	A	H	A	H	A	H	A	A	H	A	H	A	H	A	H	A	H	A	H	H	A	H	A	H	A	H	A
Result	L	W	W	W	D	D	L	D	D	L	L	D	L	L	D	W	D	L	W	L	W	D	L	D	L	D	L	W	D	L	W	L	D	L	D	D	L	L
Position	20	13	7	3	4	4	7	7	8	9	11	14	15	15	15	15	15	15	13	14	13	13	14	14	15	15	15	15	14	14	14	15	15	15	15	15	15	16

Source: Results
A = Away; H = Home; W = Win; D = Draw; L = Loss

==== Matches ====
Win Draw Loss

10 August 2018 1	Marseille	4–0	Toulouse	Marseille
20:45 CEST (UTC+02:00)	Payet 45' (pen.), 62'; Amavi (yellow card) 46'; Germain 89'; Thauvin 90+2'	Report	Jullien (yellow card) 11'; Amian (yellow card) 44'; Sangaré (yellow card) 55'	Stadium: Stade Vélodrome; Attendance: 60,747; Referee: Ruddy Buquet

19 August 2018 2	Toulouse	2–1	Bordeaux	Toulouse
17:00 CEST (UTC+2)	Leya Iseka 44'; Moubandje (yellow card) 49'; Dossevi 67'	Report	Kamano 50'; Poundjé (yellow card) 87'	Stadium: Stadium Municipal; Attendance: 15,381; Referee: François Letexier

25 August 2018 3	Toulouse	1–0	Nîmes	Toulouse
20:00 CEST (UTC+2)	Gradel 80' (pen.); Durmaz (yellow card) 90+4'	Report	Landre (yellow card) 38'; Guillaume (yellow card) 65'; Bozok (yellow card) 89'	Stadium: Stadium Municipal; Attendance: 11,746; Referee: Frank Schneider

1 September 2018 4	Guingamp	1–2	Toulouse	Guingamp
20:00 CEST (UTC+2)	Eboa Eboa (yellow card) 38'; Thuram 45'; Deaux (yellow card) 54'; Didot (yellow card) 84'	Report	Gradel 2'; Sangaré 12'; Todibo (yellow card) 17' (yellow-red card) 26'	Stadium: Stade de Roudourou; Attendance: 12,327; Referee: Karim Abed

15 September 2018 5	Toulouse	1–1	Monaco	Toulouse
20:00 CEST (UTC+02:00)	Amian (yellow card) 38'; Gradel (yellow card) 73'; Leya Iseka 79'	Report	Jemerson (yellow card) 28'; Henrichs (yellow card) 48'; Tielemans 57'; Diop (yellow card) 81'	Stadium: Stadium Municipal; Attendance: 16,689; Referee: Ruddy Buquet

22 September 2018 6	Angers	0–0	Toulouse	Angers
20:00 CEST (UTC+2)	Capelle (yellow card) 34'	Report	Sangaré (yellow card) 43'; Amian (yellow card) 55'	Stadium: Stade Raymond Kopa; Attendance: 10,021; Referee: Florent Batta

25 September 2018 7	Toulouse	2–3	Saint-Étienne	Toulouse
21:00	Gradel 63'; Durmaz 78'; Todibo (yellow card) 87'	Report	Monnet-Paquet (yellow card) 21'; Diony 23'; Cabella 66', (yellow card) 90+2'; Salibur (yellow card) 75'	Stadium: Stadium Municipal; Attendance: 14,008; Referee: Amaury Delerue

30 September 2018 8	Rennes	1–1	Toulouse	Rennes
15:00	André (yellow card) 59'; Niang 70' (pen.)	Report	Sangaré (yellow card) 28'; Leya Iseka (yellow card) 43', (red card) 43'; Todibo (yellow card) 69', (goal) 88'	Stadium: Roazhon Park; Attendance: 21,173; Referee: Thomas Leonard

5 October 2018 9	Toulouse	1–1	Nice	Toulouse
20:45	Moreira (yellow card) 46'; Dossevi 54'	Report	Srarfi 29'; Tameze (yellow card) 45'; Walter (yellow card) 86'	Stadium: Stadium Municipal; Attendance: 14,162; Referee: Willy Delajod

20 October 2018 10	Nantes	4–0	Toulouse	Nantes
20:00 CEST (UTC+2)	Sala 25', 71' (77.); Boschilia 38'; Rongier (yellow card) 45+1'; Lucas Lima (yellow card) 51'; Limbombe (yellow card) 66'	Report	Mbia (yellow card) 38'	Stadium: Stade de la Beaujoire; Attendance: 22,613; Referee: Benoît Bastien

27 October 2018 11	Toulouse	0–3	Montpellier	Toulouse
20:00 CEST (UTC+2)	Durmaz (yellow card) 22'; Jean (yellow card) 90+1'	Report	Delort (yellow card) 1', (goal) 24'; Laborde 21'; Reynet 90+3' (o.g.)	Stadium: Stadium Municipal; Attendance: 14,107; Referee: Karim Abed

3 November 2018 12	Strasbourg	1–1	Toulouse	Strasbourg
20:00 CET (UTC+1)	Sissoko (yellow card) 20'; Mothiba 51'; Lala (yellow card) 74'; Mitrović (yellow card) 90+5'	Report	Garcia (yellow card) 48'; Gradel 72'	Stadium: Stade de la Meinau; Attendance: 25,034; Referee: Jérôme Miguelgorry

10 November 2018 13	Toulouse	0–1	Amiens	Toulouse
20:00 CET (UTC+1)	Sidibé (yellow card) 45'; Gradel (yellow card) 80'; Cahuzac (yellow card) 90'	Report	Blin 28'; Adénon (yellow card) 31'	Stadium: Stadium Municipal; Attendance: 13,552; Referee: Eric Wattellier

24 November 2018 14	Paris Saint-Germain	1–0	Toulouse	Paris
17:00 CET (UTC+1)	Cavani 9'	Report		Stadium: Parc des Princes; Attendance: 47,244; Referee: Hakim Ben El Hadj

2 December 2018 15	Toulouse	2–2	Dijon	Toulouse
15:00 CET (UTC+01:00)	Reynet (red card) 5'; Gradel 72'; Leya Iseka (yellow card) 73', (goal) 77'	Report	Lautoa (yellow card) 3'; Aguerd 25'; Abeid (yellow card) 63', (goal) 68'; Sammaritano (yellow card) 90+2'	Stadium: Stadium Municipal; Attendance: 10,279; Referee: Jérôme Miguelgorry

5 December 2018 16	Reims	0–1	Toulouse	Reims
19:00 CET (UTC+01:00)	Romao (yellow card) 48'; Engels (yellow card) 60'; Doumbia (yellow card) 79'	Report	Gradel (yellow card) 39'; Sylla 45', (yellow card) 77'; Durmaz (yellow card) 46'; Garcia (yellow card) 78' (yellow-red card) 90+5'; Diakité (yellow card) 81'	Stadium: Stade Auguste Delaune; Attendance: 10,609; Referee: Jérémy Stinat

8 December 2018 17	Toulouse	Postponed	Lyon	Toulouse
19:00 CET (UTC+1)				Stadium: Stadium Municipal
Note: Match postponed due to security concerns as a result of the yellow vests movement.

18 December 2018 18	Caen	2–1	Toulouse	Caen
19:30 CET (UTC+1)	Khaoui 18'; Armougom (yellow card) 35'; Crivelli (yellow card) 84'; Fajr 90+9' (pen.)	Report	Gradel 44'; Cahuzac (yellow card) 49'; Amian (yellow card) 86'	Stadium: Stade Michel d'Ornano; Attendance: 11,631; Referee: Antony Gautier

22 December 2018 19	Lille	1–2	Toulouse	Villeneuve-d'Ascq
21:00 CET (UTC+1)	Leão 17'; Mendes (yellow card) 45+2'; Dabila (yellow card) 62'; Maia (yellow card) 66'	Report	Moubandje (yellow card) 38'; Durmaz (yellow card) 43'; Gradel 50' (pen.), 64' (pen.); Amian (yellow card) 71'; Sidibé (yellow card) 88'	Stadium: Stade Pierre-Mauroy; Attendance: 30,186; Referee: Benoît Millot

13 January 2019 20	Toulouse	1–2	Strasbourg	Toulouse
17:00 CET (UTC+1)	Sanogo 29' (pen.); Bostock (yellow card) 45+3'	Report	Ajorque 17'; Martin (yellow card) 36'; Sissoko 64'	Stadium: Stadium Municipal; Attendance: 15,465; Referee: Hakim Ben El Hadj

16 January 2019 17	Toulouse	2–2	Lyon	Toulouse
19:00 CET (UTC+1)	Durmaz 12', 74' (pen.); Cahuzac (yellow card) 45+1'; Moubandje (yellow card) 53'; Jullien (yellow card) 86'; Moreira (yellow card) 90+5'	Report	Solet (yellow card) 10'; Depay (yellow card) 45+1'; Dembélé 76'; Morel (yellow card) 78'; Fekir 88'	Stadium: Stadium Municipal; Attendance: 16,587; Referee: Ruddy Buquet
Note: The match, originally scheduled for 8 December 2018, was postponed due to security concerns as a result of the yellow vests movement.

19 January 2019 21	Nîmes	0–1	Toulouse	Nîmes
20:00 CET (UTC+1)	Briançon (yellow card) 50'; Savanier (yellow card) 75'; Thioub (yellow card) 81'	Report	Sidibé (yellow card) 32'; Sanogo 41'	Stadium: Stade des Costières; Attendance: 12,736; Referee: Jérôme Brisard

27 January 2019 22	Toulouse	0–0	Angers	Toulouse
20:00 CET (UTC+1)	Sylla (yellow card) 82'	Report	Thomas (yellow card) 84'	Stadium: Stadium Municipal; Attendance: 11,296; Referee: Johan Hamel

2 February 2019 23	Monaco	2–1	Toulouse	Monaco
20:00 CET (UTC+1)	Ballo-Touré (yellow card) 9'; Golovin 15'; Fàbregas 62'; Jemerson (yellow card) 90+4'	Report	Jullien 20'; Gradel (yellow card) 45+2'; Diakité (yellow card) 50'; Sylla (yellow card) 60'	Stadium: Stade Louis II; Attendance: 5,896; Referee: Mikael Lesage

10 February 2019 24	Toulouse	1–1	Reims	Toulouse
15:00 CET (UTC+1)	Cahuzac (yellow card) 12'; Gradel 81'; Shoji (yellow card) 84'	Report	Dingomé (yellow card) 26'; Suk (yellow card) 45'; Oudin 55'; Dia (yellow card) 71'; Fontaine (yellow card) 85'	Stadium: Stadium Municipal; Attendance: 15,240; Referee: Karim Abed

17 February 2019 25	Bordeaux	2–1	Toulouse	Bordeaux
15:00 CET (UTC+1)	Bašić 2'; Palencia (yellow card) 68'; Jovanović (yellow card) 77'; Briand 82'	Report	Cahuzac (yellow card) 29', (goal) 70'; Sangaré (yellow card) 38'	Stadium: Matmut Atlantique; Attendance: 19,332; Referee: Hakim Ben El Hadj

24 February 2019 26	Toulouse	1–1	Caen	Toulouse
15:00 CET (UTC+1)	Sanogo (yellow card) 9'; Cahuzac (yellow card) 54'; Gradel 90+1'	Report	Diomandé (yellow card) 45+1' (yellow-red card) 90'; Crivelli 45+3'; Guilbert (yellow card) 58'	Stadium: Stadium Municipal; Attendance: 20,439; Referee: François Letexier

3 March 2019 27	Lyon	5–1	Toulouse	Décines-Charpieu
17:00 CET (UTC+1)	Depay 10'; Traoré 30'; Fekir 35' (pen.); Dembélé 67', 71'	Report	Dossevi 15'; Jullien (yellow card) 45'; Cahuzac (yellow card) 56', (red card) 83'	Stadium: Parc Olympique Lyonnais; Attendance: 44,881; Referee: Thomas Leonard

10 March 2019 28	Toulouse	1–0	Guingamp	Toulouse
15:00 CET (UTC+1)	Sanogo 20', (yellow card) 58'	Report	Thuram (yellow card) 27'; Coco (red card) 44'; Phiri (yellow card) 52'	Stadium: Stadium Municipal; Attendance: 19,802; Referee: Jérôme Brisard

15 March 2019 29	Nice	1–1	Toulouse	Nice
19:00 CET (UTC+1)	Cyprien 20'	Report	Sylla (yellow card) 24'; Gradel (yellow card) 61'; Mubele 88'	Stadium: Allianz Riviera; Attendance: 14,402; Referee: Olivier Thual

31 March 2019 30	Toulouse	0–1	Paris Saint-Germain	Toulouse
21:00 CEST (UTC+2)	Sangaré (yellow card) 8'; Sidibé (yellow card) 25'	Report	Kehrer (yellow card) 36'; Mbappé 74'	Stadium: Stadium Municipal; Attendance: 27,147; Referee: Amaury Delerue

7 April 2019 31	Toulouse	1–0	Nantes	Toulouse
15:00 CEST (UTC+2)	Jullien (yellow card) 21'; Shoji (yellow card) 34'; Amian (yellow card) 40'; Sylla 55'	Report	Girotto (red card) 18'; Ié (yellow card) 24'	Stadium: Stadium Municipal; Attendance: 16,264; Referee: Florent Batta

14 April 2019 32	Montpellier	2–1	Toulouse	Montpellier
15:00 CEST (UTC+2)	Mendes (yellow card) 51'; Skhiri 55'; Mollet (yellow card) 63'; Camara 77'	Report	Sidibé 67'; Jullien (yellow card) 86'	Stadium: Stade de la Mosson; Attendance: 11,986; Referee: Benoît Millot

21 April 2019 33	Toulouse	0–0	Lille	Toulouse
15:00 CEST (UTC+2)	Sidibé (yellow card) 23'; Gradel (yellow card) 41'	Report	Çelik (yellow card) 17'; Soumaré (yellow card) 52'; Mendes (yellow card) 85'	Stadium: Stadium Municipal; Attendance: 15,002; Referee: Nicolas Rainville

28 April 2019 34	Saint-Étienne	2–0	Toulouse	Saint-Étienne
17:00 CEST (UTC+2)	Berić 2', 10'; Debuchy (yellow card) 68'	Report	Sangaré (yellow card) 47'; Sylla (yellow card) 83'	Stadium: Stade Geoffroy-Guichard; Attendance: 28,203; Referee: Jérémy Stinat

5 May 2019 35	Toulouse	2–2	Rennes	Toulouse
15:00 CEST (UTC+2)	Sidibé (yellow card) 21'; Sanogo (yellow card) 30'; Durmaz 41' (pen.); Sangaré (yellow card) 42'; Dossevi 51'	Report	Grenier (yellow card) 28'; Niang (yellow card) 31', (goal) 35'; Sarr 59' (pen.); Lea Siliki (yellow card) 90+2'	Stadium: Stadium Municipal; Attendance: 16,794; Referee: Willy Delajod

11 May 2019 36	Amiens	0–0	Toulouse	Amiens
20:00 CEST (UTC+2)	Dibassy (yellow card) 57'; Ghoddos (yellow card) 78'	Report	Jullien (yellow card) 9'; Sidibé (yellow card) 24'; Durmaz (yellow card) 61'; Cahuzac (yellow card) 82'	Stadium: Stade de la Licorne; Attendance: 11,684; Referee: François Letexier

18 May 2019 37	Toulouse	2–5	Marseille	Toulouse
21:00 CEST (UTC+2)	Jullien (yellow card) 22'; Leya Iseka 26'; Gradel 61'	Report	Sanson 29'; Amavi (yellow card) 39'; Sakai 50'; Rami (yellow card) 58'; N'Jie 76'; Thauvin 90', 90+1'	Stadium: Stadium Municipal; Attendance: 24,293; Referee: Frank Schneider

24 May 2019 38	Dijon	2–1	Toulouse	Dijon
21:05 CEST (UTC+2)	Aguerd (yellow card) 37'; Sliti 58'; Tavares 63'; Jeannot (yellow card) 88'	Report	Sidibé (yellow card) 26'; Diakité 33'; Jullien (yellow card) 84'	Stadium: Stade Gaston Gérard; Attendance: 14,050; Referee: Mikael Lesage

=== Coupe de France ===
6 January 2019 Round of 64	Toulouse	4–1	Nice	Toulouse
17:15 CET (UTC+1)	Diakité 40'; Gradel 45', (yellow card) 71'; Dossevi 68'; García (yellow card) 59', (goal) 85'; Sylla (yellow card) 75'	Report	Sacko 48'; Jallet (yellow card) 71'; Sarr (yellow card) 82'	Stadium: Stadium Municipal; Attendance: 7,979; Referee: Amaury Delerue

22 January 2019 Round of 32	Toulouse	4–4 (a.e.t.) (4–3 p)	Reims	Toulouse
18:30 CET (UTC+1)	Leya Iseka 44', 82'; Jean (yellow card) 45+2'; García 68'; Sidibé (yellow card) 79'; Sylla (yellow card) 88'; Mubele (yellow card) 108'; Gradel 119' (pen.)	Report	Dia 47'; Chavalerin (yellow card) 74', (goal) 87'; Oudin 77'; Cafaro 108'; Abdelhamid (yellow card) 111'	Stadium: Stadium Municipal; Attendance: 6,652; Referee: Clément Turpin
	Penalties
	Dossevi (penalty scored); Sylla (penalty missed); Mubele (penalty scored); Leya Iseka (penalty scored); Gradel (penalty scored)		(penalty scored) Chavarría; (penalty missed) Chavalerin; (penalty scored) Fontaine; (penalty scored) Mbemba; (penalty missed) Cafaro

5 February 2019 Round of 16	Nantes	2–0	Toulouse	Nantes
18:30 CET (UTC+1)	Coulibaly 8'; Limbombe 41'	Report	Sidibé (yellow card) 38'	Stadium: Stade de la Beaujoire; Attendance: 9,141; Referee: Jérôme Miguelgorry

=== Coupe de la Ligue ===
31 October 2018 Round of 32	Toulouse	0–1	Lorient	Toulouse
21:05 CET (UTC+1)	Sylla (yellow card) 28'; Yago (yellow card) 45'	Report	Kamissoko (yellow card) 33'; Guel (yellow card) 46'; Bila 74'	Stadium: Stadium Municipal; Attendance: 8,445; Referee: Florent Batta
