= 2019–20 RC Lens season =

RC Lens
2019–20 season
- Owner: Amber Capital LP
- President: Joseph Oughourlian
- Head coach: Philippe Montanier
- Stadium: Stade Bollaert-Delelis
- Ligue 2: 2nd (promoted)
- Coupe de France: Eighth round
- Coupe de la Ligue: Third round
- Top goalscorer: League: Florian Sotoca (8); All: Florian Sotoca (9)
Home colours	Away colours

The 2019–20 season was the 114th season in the existence of RC Lens and the club's fifth consecutive season in the second division of French football. In addition to the domestic league, Lens participated in this season's editions of the Coupe de France and the Coupe de la Ligue. The season was scheduled to cover the period from 1 July 2019 to 30 June 2020.

== Players ==
=== First-team squad ===
As of 15 February 2020.

Note: Flags indicate national team as defined under FIFA eligibility rules; some limited exceptions apply. Players may hold more than one non-FIFA nationality.

No.	Pos.	Nation	Player
1	GK	FRA	Didier Desprez
5	DF	FRA	Zakaria Diallo
6	MF	FRA	Manuel Perez
7	FW	FRA	Florian Sotoca
9	FW	FRA	Gaëtan Robail
11	FW	FRA	Mouaad Madri
13	DF	FRA	Clément Michelin
14	FW	GUI	Jules Keita
15	DF	CPV	Steven Fortès
16	GK	FRA	Jean-Louis Leca
18	MF	FRA	Yannick Cahuzac
19	MF	SCO	Charles Boli
20	DF	MLI	Cheick Traoré

No.	Pos.	Nation	Player
21	DF	MLI	Massadio Haïdara
22	MF	FRA	Tony Mauricio
23	FW	FRA	Simon Banza
24	DF	FRA	Jonathan Gradit
25	FW	FRA	Corentin Jean (on loan from Toulouse)
26	DF	SRB	Aleksandar Radovanović
27	MF	BEL	Guillaume Gillet
28	MF	MLI	Cheick Doucouré
29	DF	BRA	Vítor Costa (on loan from Inter de Lages)
30	GK	FRA	Thomas Vincensini
—	DF	SEN	Cory Sene
—	MF	FRA	Tom Ducrocq
—	FW	COL	Jader Valencia (on loan from Millonarios)

=== Out on loan ===
Note: Flags indicate national team as defined under FIFA eligibility rules; some limited exceptions apply. Players may hold more than one non-FIFA nationality.

No.	Pos.	Nation	Player
—	GK	FRA	Valentin Belon (on loan at Laval)
—	DF	SEN	Arial Mendy (on loan at Orléans)

No.	Pos.	Nation	Player
—	MF	BFA	Cyrille Bayala (on loan at Ajaccio)
—	FW	FRA	Benjamin Gomel (on loan at Cholet)

=== Other players under contract ===
Note: Flags indicate national team as defined under FIFA eligibility rules; some limited exceptions apply. Players may hold more than one non-FIFA nationality.

No.	Pos.	Nation	Player
—	DF	FRA	Moussa Sylla

== Pre-season and friendlies ==
Win Draw Loss

6 July 2019 Friendly	Boulogne	3–2	Lens	Boulogne-sur-Mer, France
17:00 CEST (UTC+2)				Stadium: Stade de la Libération

10 July 2019 Friendly	Sint-Truiden	1–2	Lens	Beringen, Belgium
18:30 CEST (UTC+2)				Stadium: Mijnstadion

13 July 2019 Friendly	Cercle Brugge	1–1	Lens	Knokke-Heist, Belgium
18:30 CEST (UTC+2)				Stadium: Stadion De Taeye

17 July 2019 Friendly	Lens	3–0	Waasland-Beveren	Arras, France
19:00 CEST (UTC+2)				Stadium: Degouve-Brabant Stadium

19 July 2019 Friendly	Dunkerque	2–0	Lens	Loon-Plage, France
19:00 CEST (UTC+2)				Stadium: Stade Marcel Rosseel - Terrain 1

20 July 2019 Friendly	Lens	1–3	Espanyol	Lens, France
18:00 CEST (UTC+2)				Stadium: Stade Bollaert-Delelis

== Competitions ==
=== Overview ===
Competition	First match	Last match	Starting round	Final position	Record							
Competition	First match	Last match	Starting round	Final position	Pld	W	D	L	GF	GA	GD	Win %
Ligue 2	27 July 2019	9 March 2020	Matchday 1	2nd	28	15	8	5	39	24	+15	53.57
Coupe de France	16 November 2019	8 December 2019	Seventh round	Eighth round	2	1	0	1	4	3	+1	50.00
Coupe de la Ligue	13 August 2019	29 October 2019	First round	Third round	3	1	1	1	4	6	−2	33.33
Total					33	17	9	7	47	33	+14	51.52

Source: Soccerway

=== Ligue 2 ===
==== League table ====
Pos	Team	Pld	W	D	L	GF	GA	GD	Pts	Promotion or Relegation
1	Lorient (C, P)	28	17	3	8	45	25	+20	54	Promotion to Ligue 1
2	Lens (P)	28	15	8	5	39	24	+15	53	Promotion to Ligue 1
3	Ajaccio	28	15	7	6	38	22	+16	52	
4	Troyes	28	16	3	9	34	25	+9	51	
5	Clermont	28	14	8	6	35	25	+10	50	

Source: Ligue 2
Rules for classification: 1) Points; 2) Goal difference; 3) Number of goals scored; 4) Head-to-head goal difference; 5) Fair play points
(C) Champions; (P) Promoted

==== Results summary ====
Overall								Home						Away					
Pld	W	D	L	GF	GA	GD	Pts	W	D	L	GF	GA	GD	W	D	L	GF	GA	GD
28	15	8	5	39	24	+15	53	9	3	2	19	9	+10	6	5	3	20	15	+5

Source: Ligue 2

==== Results by round ====
Round	1	2	3	4	5	6	7	8	9	10	11	12	13	14	15	16	17	18	19	20	21	22	23	24	25	26	27	28	29	30	31	32	33	34	35	36	37	38
Ground	A	H	A	H	A	A	H	A	H	A	H	A	H	A	H	A	H	A	H	A	H	A	H	H	A	H	A	H	A	H	A	H	A	H	A	H	A	H
Result	W	W	D	L	L	D	W	W	W	W	D	D	W	W	W	L	W	W	W	D	D	D	W	D	L	L	W	W	C	C	C	C	C	C	C	C	C	C
Position	5	3	3	7	11	12	10	7	3	2	2	2	1	1	1	2	2	2	1	2	2	2	2	2	2	2	2	2	2	2	2	2	2	2	2	2	2	2

Source: Ligue 2
A = Away; H = Home; W = Win; D = Draw; L = Loss

==== Matches ====
The league fixtures were announced on 14 June 2019. The Ligue 2 matches were suspended by the LFP on 13 March 2020 due to COVID-19 until further notices. On 28 April 2020, it was announced that Ligue 1 and Ligue 2 campaigns would not resume, after the country banned all sporting events until September. On 30 April, The LFP ended officially the 2019–20 season.

27 July 2019 1	Le Mans	1–2	Lens	Le Mans
15:00 CEST (UTC+2)	Moussiti-Oko 33'	Report	Sotoca 66'; Chouiar 84'	Stadium: MMArena; Referee: Arnaud Baert

3 August 2019 2	Lens	2–0	Guingamp	Lens
16:30 CET (UTC+1)	Chouiar 84'; Robail 89'	Report		Stadium: Stade Bollaert-Delelis; Referee: Nicolas Rainville

10 August 2019 3	Clermont	1–1	Lens	Clermont-Ferrand
15:00 CEST (UTC+2)		Report		Stadium: Stade Gabriel Montpied

17 August 2019 4	Lens	1–3	Le Havre	Lens
15:00 CET (UTC+1)		Report		Stadium: Stade Bollaert-Delelis

24 August 2019 5	Troyes	2–0	Lens	Troyes
15:00 CEST (UTC+2)		Report		Stadium: Stade de l'Aube

2 September 2019 6	Grenoble	2–2	Lens	Grenoble
20:45 CEST (UTC+2)		Report		Stadium: Stade des Alpes

16 September 2019 7	Lens	1–0	Châteauroux	Lens
20:45 CET (UTC+1)		Report		Stadium: Stade Bollaert-Delelis

21 September 2019 8	Caen	0–2	Lens	Caen
15:00 CEST (UTC+2)		Report		Stadium: Stade Michel d'Ornano

28 September 2019 9	Lens	2–1	Paris FC	Lens
14:45 CET (UTC+1)		Report		Stadium: Stade Bollaert-Delelis

7 October 2019 10	Orléans	1–4	Lens	Orléans
20:45 CEST (UTC+2)		Report		Stadium: Stade de la Source

21 October 2019 11	Lens	0–0	Auxerre	Lens
20:45 CET (UTC+1)		Report		Stadium: Stade Bollaert-Delelis

25 October 2019 12	Nancy	0–0	Lens	Tomblaine
20:00 CEST (UTC+2)		Report		Stadium: Stade Marcel Picot

2 November 2019 13	Lens	1–0	Lorient	Lens
15:00 CET (UTC+1)		Report		Stadium: Stade Bollaert-Delelis

11 November 2019 14	Rodez	1–2	Lens	Rodez
20:45 CET (UTC+1)	Henry 22'	Report	Robail 28', 63'	Stadium: Stade Paul-Lignon; Referee: Aurélien Petit

23 November 2019 15	Lens	4–0	Sochaux	Lens
15:00 CET (UTC+1)	Banza 16'; Sotoca 45' (pen.); Gillet 48'; Haïdara 88'	Report		Stadium: Stade Bollaert-Delelis; Referee: Nicolas Rainville

29 November 2019 16	Valenciennes	2–0	Lens	Valenciennes
20:00 CET (UTC+1)	Dos Santos 32'; Chevalier 72'	Report		Stadium: Stade du Hainaut; Referee: Willy Delajod

3 December 2019 17	Lens	3–0	Chambly	Lens
21:05 CET (UTC+1)	Banza 41', 57'; Robail 69'	Report		Stadium: Stade Bollaert-Delelis; Referee: Pierre Gaillouste

14 December 2019 18	Ajaccio	1–2	Lens	Ajaccio
15:00 CET (UTC+1)	Laçi 12'	Report	Sotoca 57', 71'	Stadium: Stade François Coty; Referee: Amaury Delerue

21 December 2019 19	Lens	1–0	Niort	Lens
15:00 CET (UTC+1)	Robail 52'	Report		Stadium: Stade Bollaert-Delelis; Referee: Aurélien Petit

18 January 2020 20	Guingamp	1–1	Lens	Guingamp
18:30 CET (UTC+1)	M'Changama 90'	Report	Robail 46'	Stadium: Stade de Roudourou; Referee: Jérôme Miguelgorry

25 January 2020 21	Lens	1–1	Clermont	Lens
15:00 CET (UTC+1)	Jean 72'	Report	Grbić 55'	Stadium: Stade Bollaert-Delelis; Referee: Bastien Dechepy

31 January 2020 22	Le Havre	0–0	Lens	Le Havre
20:00 CET (UTC+1)		Report		Stadium: Stade Océane; Referee: Clément Turpin

4 February 2020 23	Lens	1–0	Troyes	Lens
21:05 CET (UTC+1)	Jean 65'	Report		Stadium: Stade Bollaert-Delelis; Referee: Jérémie Pignard

10 February 2020 24	Lens	0–0	Grenoble	Lens
20:45 CET (UTC+1)		Report		Stadium: Stade Bollaert-Delelis; Referee: Nicolas Rainville

17 February 2020 25	Châteauroux	3–2	Lens	Châteauroux
20:45 CET (UTC+1)	Keny 40'; Diarra 65'; Operi 69'	Report	Doucouré 82'; Banza 86'	Stadium: Stade Gaston Petit; Referee: Willy Delajod

22 February 2020 26	Lens	1–4	Caen	Lens
15:00 CET (UTC+1)	Jean 11'	Report	Tchokounté 22' (pen.), 75'; Oniangué 32' (pen.), 72'	Stadium: Stade Bollaert-Delelis; Referee: Sylvain Palhies

2 March 2020 27	Paris FC	0–2	Lens	Paris
20:45 CET (UTC+1)		Report	Sotoca 37', 47'	Stadium: Stade Sébastien Charléty; Referee: Thierry Bouille

9 March 2020 28	Lens	1–0	Orléans	Lens
20:45 CET (UTC+1)	Sotoca 50' (pen.)	Report		Stadium: Stade Bollaert-Delelis; Referee: Pierre Gaillouste

14 March 2020 29	Auxerre	Cancelled	Lens	Auxerre
15:00 CEST (UTC+2)				Stadium: Stade de l'Abbé-Deschamps

23 March 2020 30	Lens	Cancelled	Nancy	Lens
20:45 CET (UTC+1)				Stadium: Stade Bollaert-Delelis

4 April 2020 31	Lorient	Cancelled	Lens	Lorient
15:00 CET (UTC+1)				Stadium: Stade du Moustoir

10 April 2020 32	Lens	Cancelled	Rodez	Lens
CET (UTC+1)				Stadium: Stade Bollaert-Delelis

17 April 2020 33	Sochaux	Cancelled	Lens	Montbéliard
CET (UTC+1)				Stadium: Stade Auguste Bonal

21 April 2020 34	Lens	Cancelled	Valenciennes	Lens
CET (UTC+1)				Stadium: Stade Bollaert-Delelis

24 April 2020 35	Chambly	Cancelled	Lens	Beauvais
CEST (UTC+2)				Stadium: Stade Pierre Brisson

1 May 2020 36	Lens	Cancelled	Ajaccio	Lens
CET (UTC+1)				Stadium: Stade Bollaert-Delelis

8 May 2020 37	Niort	Cancelled	Lens	Niort
CEST (UTC+2)				Stadium: Stade René Gaillard

15 May 2020 38	Lens	Cancelled	Le Mans	Lens
CET (UTC+1)				Stadium: Stade Bollaert-Delelis

=== Coupe de France ===
16 November 2019 Seventh round	Lens	3–1 (a.e.t.)	Boulogne	Lens
17:00 CET (UTC+1)	Perez 54'; Keita 108', 110'	Report	Idazza 76'	Stadium: Stade Bollaert-Delelis; Attendance: 9,007; Referee: Bastien Dechepy

8 December 2019 Eighth round	Dieppe	2–1	Lens	Saint-Aubin-sur-Scie
13:45 CET (UTC+1)	Nkeng 3'; Henoc 7'	Report	Moukandjo 61'	Stadium: Stade Jean Dasnias; Attendance: 3,948; Referee: Romain Zamo

=== Coupe de la Ligue ===
13 August 2019 First round	Troyes	1–2	Lens	Troyes
21:05 CEST (UTC+2)	Kouyaté 10'		Sene 75'; Banza 84'	Stadium: Stade de l'Aube; Attendance: 3,160; Referee: Bartolomeu Varela

27 August 2019 Second round	Lens	2–2 (5–4 p)	Clermont	Lens
21:05 CEST (UTC+2)	Sotoca 43'; Mesloub 61' (pen.)		Rajot 12'; González 48'	Stadium: Stade Bollaert-Delelis; Attendance: 11,909; Referee: Benjamin Lepaysant
	Penalties
	Boli (penalty scored); Sotoca (penalty missed); Mauricio (penalty scored); Banza (penalty scored); Gillet (penalty scored); Traoré (penalty scored)		(penalty scored) Grbić; (penalty scored) Donisa; (penalty scored) Rajot; (penalty missed) N'Diaye; (penalty scored) N'Simba; (penalty missed) Magnin

29 October 2019 Third round	Nîmes	3–0	Lens	Nîmes
18:45 CEST (UTC+2)	Sene 24' (o.g.); Sainte-Luce 39'; Stojanovski 87' (pen.)			Stadium: Stade des Costières; Attendance: 6,284; Referee: Frank Schneider
