= 2017–18 Toulouse FC season =

Toulouse
2017–18 season
- Chairman: Olivier Sadran
- Manager: Pascal Dupraz (until 22 January); Mickaël Debève (from 22 January)
- Stadium: Stadium Municipal
- Ligue 1: 18th
- Coupe de France: Round of 32
- Coupe de la Ligue: Round of 8
- Top goalscorer: League: Max Gradel (8); All: Max Gradel (10)
- Highest home attendance: 31,909 vs. PSG (10 February 2018)
- Lowest home attendance: 10,348 vs. Nice (29 November 2017)
- Average home league attendance: 16,936 (L1 + play-off)
| Home colours | Away colours | Third colours |

The 2017–18 Toulouse FC season is the 48th professional season of the club since its creation in 1970.

== Players ==
French teams are limited to four players without EU citizenship. Hence, the squad list includes only the principal nationality of each player; several non-European players on the squad have dual citizenship with an EU country. Also, players from the ACP countries—countries in Africa, the Caribbean, and the Pacific that are signatories to the Cotonou Agreement—are not counted against non-EU quotas due to the Kolpak ruling.

=== First team squad ===
As of 13 February 2018

Note: Flags indicate national team as defined under FIFA eligibility rules; some limited exceptions apply. Players may hold more than one non-FIFA nationality.

| No. | Pos. | Nation | Player |
|---|---|---|---|
| 1 | GK | URU | Mauro Goicoechea |
| 2 | DF | FRA | Kelvin Amian Adou |
| 5 | DF | FRA | Issa Diop |
| 6 | DF | FRA | Christopher Jullien (captain) |
| 8 | FW | FRA | Corentin Jean |
| 9 | FW | FRA | Yaya Sanogo |
| 10 | FW | FRA | Andy Delort |
| 11 | FW | SWE | Ola Toivonen |
| 12 | DF | GUI | Issiaga Sylla |
| 13 | DF | FRA | Clément Michelin |
| 14 | MF | FRA | Jordan Sebban |
| 15 | FW | CIV | Max-Alain Gradel |
| 16 | GK | FRA | Marc Vidal |
| 17 | MF | CIV | Ibrahim Sangaré |

| No. | Pos. | Nation | Player |
|---|---|---|---|
| 18 | DF | CPV | Steven Fortès |
| 19 | MF | BRA | Somália |
| 20 | DF | BFA | Steeve Yago |
| 21 | MF | SWE | Jimmy Durmaz |
| 23 | MF | FRA | Yann Bodiger |
| 24 | FW | COD | Firmin Mubele |
| 25 | MF | FRA | Giannelli Imbula |
| 26 | MF | FRA | Quentin Boisgard |
| 27 | MF | FRA | Alexis Blin |
| 28 | MF | FRA | Hakim El Mokeddem |
| 29 | DF | SUI | François Moubandje |
| 30 | GK | FRA | Thibault Cottes |
| 40 | GK | FRA | Alban Lafont |

=== Out on loan ===
Note: Flags indicate national team as defined under FIFA eligibility rules; some limited exceptions apply. Players may hold more than one non-FIFA nationality.

| No. | Pos. | Nation | Player |
|---|---|---|---|
| — | MF | FRA | Jessy Pi (on loan to Brest) |

== Transfers ==
=== Transfers in ===
| Date | Pos. | Player | Age | Moved from | Fee | Notes |
|---|---|---|---|---|---|---|
| 21 June 2017 | DF | (Cape Verde) Steven Fortès | 25 | (France) Le Havre | Free | |
| 3 July 2017 | FW | (France) Corentin Jean | 21 | (France) Monaco | Undisclosed | |
| 6 July 2017 | FW | (France) (Ivory Coast) Yaya Sanogo | 24 | (England) Arsenal | Free | |
| 25 July 2017 | DF | (France) Yannick Cahuzac | 32 | (France) Bastia | Undisclosed | |

=== Loans in ===
| Date | Pos. | Player | Age | Loaned from | Return date | Notes |
|---|---|---|---|---|---|---|
| 15 August 2017 | FW | (Ivory Coast) Max-Alain Gradel | 29 | (England) AFC Bournemouth | 30 June 2018 | |
| 15 August 2017 | MF | (France) Giannelli Imbula | 24 | (England) Stoke City | 30 June 2018 | |
| 30 January 2018 | FW | (Democratic Republic of the Congo) Firmin Ndombe Mubele | 25 | (France) Rennes | 30 June 2018 | |

=== Transfers out ===
| Date | Pos. | Player | Age | Moved to | Fee | Notes |
|---|---|---|---|---|---|---|
| 4 July 2017 | DF | (Serbia) Aleksandar Pešić | 25 | (Serbia) Red Star Belgrade | €750,000 | |
| 13 July 2017 | MF | (Poland) Dominik Furman | 24 | (Poland) Wisła Płock | €350,000 | |
| 30 June 2017 | MF | (France) Mathieu Cafaro | 20 | (France) Reims | Free | |
| 13 July 2017 | FW | (Denmark) Martin Braithwaite | 25 | (England) Middlesbrough | £9,000,000 | |
| 12 July 2017 | MF | (Mali) Tongo Doumbia | 27 | (Croatia) Dinamo Zagreb | €800,000 | |

=== Loans out ===
| Date | Pos. | Player | Age | Loaned to | Return date | Notes |
|---|---|---|---|---|---|---|
| 13 July 2017 | MF | (France) Jessy Pi | 23 | (France) Brest | 30 June 2018 | |

== Competitions ==
=== Ligue 1 ===
==== League table ====
| Pos | Team | Pld | W | D | L | GF | GA | GD | Pts | Qualification or relegation |
|---|---|---|---|---|---|---|---|---|---|---|
| 16 | Caen | 38 | 10 | 8 | 20 | 27 | 52 | −25 | 38 | |
| 17 | Lille | 38 | 10 | 8 | 20 | 41 | 67 | −26 | 38 | |
| 18 | Toulouse (O) | 38 | 9 | 10 | 19 | 38 | 54 | −16 | 37 | Qualification for the relegation play-off final |
| 19 | Troyes (R) | 38 | 9 | 6 | 23 | 32 | 59 | −27 | 33 | Relegation to Ligue 2 |
| 20 | Metz (R) | 38 | 6 | 8 | 24 | 34 | 76 | −42 | 26 | Relegation to Ligue 2 |

Source: Ligue 1 and Soccerway
Rules for classification: 1) Points; 2) Goal difference; 3) Head-to-head points; 4) Head-to-head goal difference; 5) Head-to-head goals scored; 6) Head-to-head away goals; 7) Goals scored; 8) Away goals scored; 9) Most goals scored in one league match; 10) Fair-play points
(O) Play-off winners; (R) Relegated

==== Results summary ====
| Overall | | | | | | | | Home | | | | | | Away | | | | | |
| Pld | W | D | L | GF | GA | GD | Pts | W | D | L | GF | GA | GD | W | D | L | GF | GA | GD |
|---|---|---|---|---|---|---|---|---|---|---|---|---|---|---|---|---|---|---|---|
| 38 | 9 | 10 | 19 | 38 | 54 | −16 | 37 | 7 | 5 | 7 | 23 | 21 | +2 | 2 | 5 | 12 | 15 | 33 | −18 |

Last updated: 9 March 2018.
Source: Competitive matches

==== Results by round ====
| Round | 1 | 2 | 3 | 4 | 5 | 6 | 7 | 8 | 9 | 10 | 11 | 12 | 13 | 14 | 15 | 16 | 17 | 18 | 19 | 20 | 21 | 22 | 23 | 24 | 25 | 26 | 27 | 28 | 29 | 30 | 31 | 32 | 33 | 34 | 35 | 36 | 37 | 38 |
|---|---|---|---|---|---|---|---|---|---|---|---|---|---|---|---|---|---|---|---|---|---|---|---|---|---|---|---|---|---|---|---|---|---|---|---|---|---|---|
| Ground | A | H | A | H | A | H | A | A | H | A | H | A | H | A | H | A | H | A | H | A | H | A | H | A | H | A | H | A | H | H | A | H | A | H | A | H | A | H |
| Result | L | W | L | W | D | L | L | D | W | W | D | L | D | L | L | L | W | L | L | L | D | L | W | W | L | D | D | D | L | D | L | L | D | W | L | L | L | W |
| Position | 13 | 9 | 16 | 10 | 9 | 13 | 14 | 15 | 13 | 10 | 10 | 12 | 10 | 14 | 15 | 18 | 16 | 17 | 17 | 19 | 19 | 19 | 19 | 15 | 15 | 16 | 16 | 17 | 17 | 17 | 17 | 17 | 17 | 16 | 17 | 18 | 18 | 18 |

Source: Ligue1
A = Away; H = Home; W = Win; D = Draw; L = Loss

==== Matches ====
Win Draw Loss

| 4 August 2017 1 | Monaco | 3–2 | Toulouse FC | Monaco |
| 20:45 CEST (UTC+02:00) | Diop 28'; Falcao 58'; Glik 70' | Report | Machach 6'; Delort 53' | Stadium: Stade Louis II; Attendance: 13,572; Referee: Clément Turpin |

| 12 August 2017 2 | Toulouse | 1–0 | Montpellier | Toulouse |
| 20:00 CEST (UTC+02:00) | Durmaz 43' (pen.) | Report | | Stadium: Stadium Municipal; Attendance: 12,865; Referee: Ruddy Buquet |

| 20 August 2017 3 | Paris Saint-Germain | 6–2 | Toulouse | Paris |
| 21:00 CEST (UTC+02:00) | Neymar 31', 90'; Rabiot 35'; Cavani 75' (pen.); Pastore 82'; Kurzawa 84' | Report | Gradel 18'; Silva 78' (o.g.) | Stadium: Parc des Princes; Attendance: 47,221; Referee: Amaury Delerue |

| 26 August 2017 4 | Toulouse | 3–2 | Rennes | Toulouse |
| 20:00 CEST (UTC+02:00) | Durmaz 35', 71' (pen.); Diop 58' | Report | Mubele 7'; Sarr 66' | Stadium: Stadium Municipal; Attendance: 10,651; Referee: Frank Schneider |

| 9 September 2017 5 | Troyes | 0–0 | Toulouse FC | Troyes |
| 20:00 CEST (UTC+02:00) | | Report | | Stadium: Stade de l'Aube; Attendance: 10,060; Referee: Hakim Ben El Hadj |

| 15 September 2017 6 | Toulouse | 0–1 | Bordeaux | Toulouse |
| 20:45 CEST (UTC+02:00) | | Report | Malcom 69' | Stadium: Stadium Municipal; Attendance: 13,616; Referee: Clément Turpin |

| 24 September 2017 7 | Marseille | 2–0 | Toulouse | Marseille |
| 21:00 CEST (UTC+02:00) | Thauvin 37'; Ocampos 61' | Report | | Stadium: stadium Orange-Vélodrome; Attendance: 39,501; Referee: Benoît Millot |

| 30 September 2017 8 | EA Guingamp | 1–1 | Toulouse | Guingamp |
| 20:00 CEST (UTC+02:00) | Thuram 2' | Report | Somália 40' | Stadium: Stade de Roudourou; Attendance: 13,196; Referee: Ruddy Buquet |

| 14 October 2017 9 | Toulouse | 1–0 | Amiens | Toulouse |
| 20:00 CEST (UTC+02:00) | A. Delort 40' | Report | | Stadium: Stadium Municipal; Attendance: 15,308; Referee: François Letexier |

| 21 October 2017 10 | Angers | 0–1 | Toulouse | Angers |
| 20:00 CEST (UTC+02:00) | | Report | Diop 38' | Stadium: Stade Raymond Kopa; Attendance: 11,001; Referee: Johan Hamel |

| 29 October 2017 11 | Toulouse | 0–0 | Saint-Étienne | Toulouse |
| 17:00 CET (UTC+01:00) | | Report | | Stadium: Stadium Municipal; Attendance: 15,062; Referee: Jérôme Brisard |

| 4 November 2017 12 | Nantes | 2–1 | Toulouse | Nantes |
| 20:00 CET (UTC+01:00) | Thomasson 16'; Sala 67' | Report | Blin 60' | Stadium: Stade de la Beaujoire; Attendance: 21,390; Referee: Antony Gautier |

| 18 November 2017 13 | Toulouse | 0–0 | Metz | Toulouse |
| 20:00 CET (UTC+01:00) | | Report | | Stadium: Stadium Municipal; Attendance: 15,656; Referee: Hakim Ben El Hadj |

| 25 November 2017 14 | Dijon | 3–1 | Toulouse | Dijon |
| 20:00 CET (UTC+01:00) | Kwon 42'; Xeka 57'; Saïd 64' | Report | Delort 71' | Stadium: Stade Gaston Gérard; Attendance: 10,126; Referee: Stéphane Jochem |

| 29 November 2017 15 | Toulouse | 1–2 | Nice | Toulouse |
| 19:00 CET (UTC+01:00) | Delort 3' | Report | 80' (pen.) Balotelli; 90+1' Srarfi | Stadium: Stadium Municipal; Attendance: 10,348; Referee: Johan Hamel |

| 2 December 2017 16 | Lille | 1–0 | Toulouse | Villeneuve-d'Ascq |
| 20:00 CET (UTC+01:00) | Pépé 63' | Report | | Stadium: Stade Pierre-Mauroy; Attendance: 29,287; Referee: Benoît Millot |

| 9 December 2017 17 | Toulouse | 2–0 | SM Caen | Toulouse |
| 20:00 CET (UTC+01:00) | Da Silva 61' (o.g.); Gradel 73' (pen.) | Report | | Stadium: Stadium Municipal; Attendance: 12,613; Referee: Sébastien Moreira |

| 16 December 2017 18 | Strasbourg | 2–1 | Toulouse | Strasbourg |
| 20:00 CET (UTC+01:00) | Martin 25' (pen.); Mangane 52' | Report | Gradel 30' | Stadium: Stade de la Meinau; Attendance: 23,315; Referee: Sébastien Desiage |

| 19 December 2017 19 | Toulouse | 1–2 | Lyon | Toulouse |
| 20:50 CET (UTC+01:00) | Gradel 90+6' (pen.) | Report | Fekir 24' (pen.); Rafael 90+3' | Stadium: Stadium Municipal; Attendance: 15,853; Referee: François Letexier |

| 14 January 2018 20 | Saint-Étienne | 2–0 | Toulouse | Saint-Étienne |
| 15:00 CET (UTC+01:00) | Beric 45'; Dioussé 86' | Report | | Stadium: Stade Geoffroy-Guichard; Attendance: 23,295; Referee: Mikael Lesage |

| 17 January 2018 21 | Toulouse FC | 1–1 | Nantes | Toulouse |
| 19:00 CET (UTC+01:00) | Gradel 90+5' | Report | Krhin 19' | Stadium: Stadium Municipal; Attendance: 13,742; Referee: Thomas Léonard |

| 20 January 2018 22 | Montpellier | 2–1 | Toulouse | Montpellier |
| 20:00 CET (UTC+01:00) | Sambia 43'; Sio 90+5' | Report | Imbula 30' | Stadium: Stade de la Mosson; Attendance: 10,652; Referee: Jérôme Brisard |

| 27 January 2018 23 | Toulouse | 1–0 | Troyes | Toulouse |
| 20:00 CET (UTC+01:00) | Sanogo 11' | Report | | Stadium: Stadium Municipal; Attendance: 19,028; Referee: Benoît Bastien |

| 3 February 2018 24 | Nice | 0–1 | Toulouse FC | Nice |
| 20:00 CET (UTC+01:00) | | Report | Gradel 67' | Stadium: Allianz Riviera; Attendance: 17,231; Referee: Antony Gautier |

| 10 February 2018 25 | Toulouse | 0–1 | Paris Saint-Germain | Toulouse |
| 17:00 CET (UTC+01:00) | | Report | Diop 68' (o.g.) | Stadium: Stadium Municipal; Attendance: 31,909; Referee: Ruddy Buquet |

| 17 February 2018 26 | Amiens | 0–0 | Toulouse | Amiens |
| 20:00 CET (UTC+01:00) | | Report | | Stadium: Stade de la Licorne; Attendance: 8,730; Referee: Frank Schneider |

| 24 February 2018 27 | Toulouse | 3–3 | Monaco | Toulouse |
| 17:00 CET (UTC+01:00) | Sangaré 24'; Delort 78' (pen.); Sanogo 87' | Report | Lopes 8', 47'; Jovetić 72' | Stadium: Stadium Municipal; Attendance: 13,184; Referee: Benoît Millot |

| 3 March 2018 28 | Metz | 1–1 | Toulouse | Longeville-lès-Metz |
| 20:00 CET (UTC+01:00) | Roux 32' | Report | Amian 84' | Stadium: Stade Saint-Symphorien; Attendance: 11,287; Referee: Mikael Lesage |

| 11 March 2018 29 | Toulouse | 1–2 | Marseille | Toulouse |
| 21:00 CET (UTC+01:00) | Mubele 19' | Report | Ocampos 10'; Mitroglou 78' | Stadium: Stadium Municipal; Attendance: 26,320; Referee: François Letexier |

| 17 March 2018 30 | Toulouse | 2–2 | Strasbourg | Toulouse |
| 20:00 CET (UTC+01:00) | Sanogo 89', 90+1' | Report | Blayac 46'; Yago 90+4' (o.g.) | Stadium: Stadium Municipal; Attendance: 14,273; Referee: Sébastien Moreira |

| 1 April 2018 31 | Lyon | 2–0 | Toulouse | Décines-Charpieu |
| 21:00 CEST (UTC+02:00) | Depay 23', 43' | Report | | Stadium: Parc Olympique Lyonnais; Attendance: 48,548; Referee: Benoît Bastien |

| 6 April 2018 32 | Toulouse | 0–1 | Dijon | Toulouse |
| 20:00 CEST (UTC+02:00) | | Report | Kwon 10' | Stadium: Stadium Municipal; Attendance: 17,246; Referee: Hakim Ben el Hadj |

| 25 April 2018 33 | Caen | 0–0 | Toulouse | Caen |
| 18:45 CEST (UTC+02:00) | | Report | | Stadium: Stade Michel d'Ornano; Attendance: 18,658; Referee: Benoît Millot |

| 21 April 2018 34 | Toulouse | 2–0 | Angers | Toulouse |
| 20:00 CEST (UTC+02:00) | Sanogo 42'; Gradel 60' (pen.) | Report | | Stadium: Stadium Municipal; Attendance: 14,414; Referee: Jérôme Brisard |

| 29 April 2018 35 | Rennes | 2–1 | Toulouse | Rennes |
| 15:00 CEST (UTC+02:00) | Lea Siliki 39'; Bourigeaud 47' | Report | Gnagnon 18' (o.g.) | Stadium: Roazhon Park; Attendance: 20,138; Referee: Stéphane Jochem |

| 6 May 2018 36 | Toulouse | 2–3 | Lille | Toulouse |
| 17:00 CEST (UTC+02:00) | Jean 9'; Jullien 44' | Report | Pépé 5', 82'; Bissouma 80' | Stadium: Stadium Municipal; Attendance: 26,251; Referee: Clément Turpin |

| 12 May 2018 37 | Bordeaux | 4–2 | Toulouse | Bordeaux |
| 21:00 CEST (UTC+02:00) | Braithwaite 38', 49'; Lerager 73'; Malcom 78' | Report | Sylla 29'; Diop 90' | Stadium: Stade Matmut-Atlantique; Attendance: 38,630; Referee: Ruddy Buquet |

| 19 May 2018 38 | Toulouse | 2–1 | Guingamp | Toulouse |
| 21:00 CEST (UTC+02:00) | Max-Alain Gradel 59'; Sanogo 63' | Report | Grenier 66' | Stadium: Stadium Municipal; Attendance: 24,306; Referee: Mikael Lasage |

=== Relegation Play Off ===
| 23 May 2018 first leg | Ajaccio | 0–3 | Toulouse | Montpellier |
| 20:45 CEST (UTC+02:00) | | Report | Gradel 45+3'; Jullien 51'; Sanogo 65' | Stadium: Stade de la Mosson; Attendance: 0 Referee: Ruddy Buquet |

| 27 May 2018 second leg | Toulouse | 1–0 | Ajaccio | Toulouse |
| 21:00 CEST (UTC+02:00) | Durmaz 88' | Report | | Stadium: Stadium Municipal; Attendance: 16,519; Referee: Ruddy Buquet |

=== Coupe de France ===
| 6 January 2018 Round of 64 | Toulouse | 1–0 | Nice | Toulouse |
| 15:00 CEST (UTC+01:00) | Somália 51' | Report | Tameze (yellow card) 65'; Dante (yellow card) 82' | Stadium: Stadium Municipal; Attendance: 8,318; Referee: Jérôme Brisard |

| 23 January 2018 Round of 32 | Bourg Péronnas | 2–0 | Toulouse | Bourg-en-Bresse |
| 18:30 CEST (UTC+01:00) | Martins (yellow card) 47'; Court 63'; Bègue 89' | | Durmaz (yellow card) 45'; Jullien (red card) 61' | Stadium: Stade Marcel-Verchère; Attendance: 3,490; Referee: Sébastien Moreira |

=== Coupe de la Ligue ===
| 25 October 2017 Round of 32 | Toulouse | 4–2 | Clermont | Toulouse |
| 21:05 CEST (UTC+02:00) | Moubandje 21'; Sanogo 25'; Cahuzac (yellow card) 37'; Gradel 39'; Toivonen 58' | Report | Espinosa (yellow card) 5'; Dugimont 29'; Doré 31'; Kavdanski (yellow card) 45' (yellow-red card) 62'; Jeannin (yellow card) 62'; Douline (yellow card) 80' | Stadium: Stadium Municipal; Attendance: 10,222; Referee: Sébastien Desiage |

| 12 December 2017 Round of 16 | Toulouse | 2–0 | Bordeaux | Toulouse |
| 18:45 CEST (UTC+01:00) | Gradel 36' (pen.); Jullien (yellow card) 40'; Jean (yellow card) 47'; Toivonen 53' | Report | Poundje (yellow card) 11'; De Préville (yellow card) 45' | Stadium: Stadium Municipal; Attendance: 8,851; Referee: Anthony Gauthier |

| 9 January 2018 Quarter-final | Rennes | 4–2 | Toulouse | Rennes |
| 18:45 CEST (UTC+01:00) | Yago 21' (o.g.); Bourigeaud 42'; Bensebaini (yellow card) 69'; Hunou 86', 90+2'; Diallo (yellow card) 90' | Report | Sylla 40', (yellow card) 82'; Sanogo 63'; Diop (yellow card) 85'; Jean (yellow card) 88' | Stadium: Roazhon Park; Attendance: 16,766; Referee: Benoît Millot |

== Statistics ==
=== Appearances and goals ===
| No. | Pos | Nat | Player | Total | | Ligue 1 | | Coupe de France | | Coupe de la Ligue | |
| No. | Pos | Nat | Player | Apps | Goals | Apps | Goals | Apps | Goals | Apps | Goals |
Goalkeepers
| 1 | GK | (Uruguay) URU | Mauro Goicoechea | 1 | 0 | 0 | 0 | 1 | 0 | 0 | 0 |
| 16 | GK | (France) FRA | Marc Vidal | 0 | 0 | 0 | 0 | 0 | 0 | 0 | 0 |
| 40 | GK | (France) FRA | Alban Lafont | 42 | 0 | 38 | 0 | 1 | 0 | 3 | 0 |
Defenders
| 2 | DF | (France) FRA | Kelvin Amian | 39 | 1 | 35+1 | 1 | 1 | 0 | 2 | 0 |
| 5 | DF | (France) FRA | Issa Diop | 39 | 3 | 34 | 3 | 2 | 0 | 3 | 0 |
| 6 | DF | (France) FRA | Christopher Jullien | 34 | 1 | 30 | 1 | 1 | 0 | 3 | 0 |
| 12 | DF | (Guinea) GUI | Issiaga Sylla | 28 | 2 | 17+8 | 1 | 1 | 0 | 1+1 | 1 |
| 13 | DF | (France) FRA | Clément Michelin | 10 | 0 | 4+3 | 0 | 0+1 | 0 | 0+2 | 0 |
| 18 | DF | (Cape Verde) CPV | Steven Fortès | 2 | 0 | 1+1 | 0 | 0 | 0 | 0 | 0 |
| 20 | DF | (Burkina Faso) BFA | Steeve Yago | 26 | 0 | 16+5 | 0 | 2 | 0 | 3 | 0 |
| 29 | DF | (Switzerland) SUI | François Moubandje | 23 | 1 | 20+1 | 0 | 1 | 0 | 1 | 1 |
Midfielders
| 4 | MF | (France) FRA | Yannick Cahuzac | 24 | 0 | 18+2 | 0 | 1+1 | 0 | 2 | 0 |
| 17 | MF | (Ivory Coast) CIV | Ibrahim Sangaré | 22 | 1 | 18+2 | 1 | 1 | 0 | 1 | 0 |
| 19 | MF | (Brazil) BRA | Somália | 29 | 2 | 23+4 | 1 | 1 | 1 | 1 | 0 |
| 21 | MF | (Sweden) SWE | Jimmy Durmaz | 23 | 3 | 12+8 | 3 | 1+1 | 0 | 0+1 | 0 |
| 23 | MF | (France) FRA | Yann Bodiger | 9 | 0 | 2+5 | 0 | 0+1 | 0 | 1 | 0 |
| 25 | MF | (France) FRA | Giannelli Imbula | 30 | 1 | 28 | 1 | 0 | 0 | 2 | 0 |
| 26 | MF | (France) FRA | Quentin Boisgard | 9 | 0 | 1+5 | 0 | 1+1 | 0 | 0+1 | 0 |
| 27 | MF | (France) FRA | Alexis Blin | 28 | 1 | 20+6 | 1 | 2 | 0 | 0 | 0 |
Forwards
| 7 | FW | (Ivory Coast) CIV | Max Gradel | 33 | 10 | 27+2 | 8 | 1 | 0 | 3 | 2 |
| 8 | FW | (France) FRA | Corentin Jean | 38 | 1 | 18+15 | 1 | 2 | 0 | 2+1 | 0 |
| 9 | FW | (France) FRA | Yaya Sanogo | 31 | 8 | 17+10 | 6 | 0+1 | 0 | 1+2 | 2 |
| 10 | FW | (France) FRA | Andy Delort | 36 | 5 | 25+7 | 5 | 2 | 0 | 1+1 | 0 |
| 11 | FW | (Sweden) SWE | Ola Toivonen | 26 | 2 | 8+15 | 0 | 0 | 0 | 3 | 2 |
| 24 | FW | (Democratic Republic of the Congo) COD | Ndombe Mubele | 11 | 1 | 4+7 | 1 | 0 | 0 | 0 | 0 |
| 33 | FW | (Morocco) MAR | Driss Khalid | 1 | 0 | 0+1 | 0 | 0 | 0 | 0 | 0 |
Players transferred out during the season
| 7 | MF | (France) FRA | Zinédine Machach | 4 | 1 | 2+2 | 1 | 0 | 0 | 0 | 0 |

Last updated: 30 May 2018
Source: BDFutbol
