= 2020–21 RC Lens season =

RC Lens
2020–21 season
- President: Joseph Oughourlian
- Head coach: Franck Haise
- Stadium: Stade Bollaert-Delelis
- Ligue 1: 7th
- Coupe de France: Round of 32
- Top goalscorer: League: Gaël Kakuta (11); All: Gaël Kakuta (11)
- Biggest win: Monaco 0–3 Lens; Lens 4–1 Lorient
- Biggest defeat: Lille 4–0 Lens
Home colours	Away colours	Third colours

The 2020–21 season was the 115th season in the existence of RC Lens and the club's first season back in the top flight of French football. In addition to the domestic league, Lens participated in this season's edition of the Coupe de France. The season covered the period from 1 July 2020 to 30 June 2021.

== Players ==
=== First-team squad ===
As of 29 January 2021.

Note: Flags indicate national team as defined under FIFA eligibility rules; some limited exceptions apply. Players may hold more than one non-FIFA nationality.

No.	Pos.	Nation	Player
3	DF	GUI	Issiaga Sylla (on loan from Toulouse)
4	DF	FRA	Loïc Badé
5	DF	FRA	Zakaria Diallo
7	FW	FRA	Florian Sotoca
8	MF	CIV	Seko Fofana
9	FW	CMR	Ignatius Ganago
10	MF	COD	Gaël Kakuta (on loan from Amiens)
11	DF	FRA	Jonathan Clauss
13	DF	FRA	Clément Michelin
14	DF	ARG	Facundo Medina
15	DF	CPV	Steven Fortès
16	GK	FRA	Jean-Louis Leca (vice-captain)
18	MF	FRA	Yannick Cahuzac (captain)

No.	Pos.	Nation	Player
19	DF	FRA	Ismael Boura
20	DF	MLI	Cheick Traoré
21	DF	MLI	Massadio Haïdara
22	MF	FRA	Tony Mauricio
23	FW	FRA	Simon Banza
24	DF	FRA	Jonathan Gradit
25	FW	FRA	Corentin Jean
28	MF	MLI	Cheick Doucouré
29	FW	FRA	Arnaud Kalimuendo (on loan from PSG)
30	GK	VEN	Wuilker Faríñez (on loan from Millonarios)
34	MF	POR	David Costa
35	DF	FRA	Adrien Louveau
—	MF	FRA	Adam Oudjani

=== Out on loan ===
Note: Flags indicate national team as defined under FIFA eligibility rules; some limited exceptions apply. Players may hold more than one non-FIFA nationality.

No.	Pos.	Nation	Player
—	GK	FRA	Valentin Belon (on loan at Laval)
—	GK	FRA	Thomas Vincensini (on loan at Bastia)
—	FW	FRA	Gaëtan Robail (on loan at Valenciennes FC)

No.	Pos.	Nation	Player
—	MF	SCO	Charles Boli (on loan at Paris FC)
—	MF	FRA	Tom Ducrocq (on loan at Bastia)
—	FW	GUI	Jules Keita (on loan at CSKA Sofia)

== Transfers ==
=== In ===
No.	Pos	Player	Transferred from	Fee	Date	Source
15			TBD		1 July 2020	

=== Out ===
No.	Pos	Player	Transferred to	Fee	Date	Source
15			TBD		1 July 2020	

== Pre-season and friendlies ==
Win Draw Loss

16 July 2020 Friendly	Lens	1–3	Le Havre	Billy-Montigny, France
17:00 CEST (UTC+2)	Sotoca 24'	Report	Thiaré 37'; Meraş 50'; Abdelli 57'	Stadium: Les Carabiniers Billy-Montigny; Referee: Ruddy Buquet (France)

21 July 2020 Friendly	Lens	1–1	Gent	Billy-Montigny, France
16:00 CEST (UTC+2)	Sotoca 18' (pen.)	Report	Botaka 30' (pen.)	Stadium: Stade Paul Guerre

22 July 2020 Friendly	FC Chambly	Cancelled	Lens	Chambly, France
17:00 CEST (UTC+2)				Stadium: Stade des Marais

1 August 2020 Friendly	Genk	1–1	Lens	Genk, Belgium
13:00 CEST (UTC+2)	Dessers 44' (pen.)	Report	Gradit (yellow card) 43'; Michelin (yellow card) 47'; Ganago 60'	Stadium: Luminus Arena; Attendance: 0

1 August 2020 Friendly	Genk	2–3	Lens	Genk, Belgium
15:30 CEST (UTC+2)	Nygren 8'; Odey 83'	Report	Radovanović 10'; Sotoca 22'; Pereira Da Costa 24'	Stadium: Luminus Arena; Attendance: 0

5 August 2020 Friendly	Lens	1–3	Union Saint-Gilloise	Billy-Montigny, France
15:00 CEST (UTC+2)	Jean (yellow card) 50'; Oudjani 77'	Report	Hamzaoui 53'; Nielsen 59'; Undav 65'	Stadium: Les Carabiniers Billy-Montigny; Attendance: 0

5 August 2020 Friendly	Lens	1–2	Paris FC	Billy-Montigny, France
18:30 CEST (UTC+2)	Clauss (yellow card) 18'; Badé (yellow card) 22'; Sotoca 45'; Cahuzac (yellow card) 59'; Gradit (yellow card) 78'	Report	Laura 22' (pen.); Mandouki 62'	Stadium: Stade Paul Guerre; Attendance: 0

15 August 2020 Friendly	Lens	Cancelled	FC Chambly	Lens, France
14:00 CEST (UTC+2)		Report		Stadium: Stade Bollaert-Delelis

15 August 2020 Friendly	Lens	Cancelled	Sparta Rotterdam	Lens, France
19:00 CEST (UTC+2)		Report		Stadium: Stade Bollaert-Delelis

15 August 2020 Friendly	Lens	1–0	Dijon	Lens, France
19:00 CEST (UTC+2)	Gradit (yellow card) 20'; Sotoca 25'; Banza (yellow card) 80'	Report	Muzinga (yellow card) 38'; Manga (yellow card) 55'; Diop (yellow card) 90'	Stadium: Stade Bollaert-Delelis

3 September 2020 Friendly	Lens	5–2	Charleroi	Lens, France
12:00 CEST (UTC+2)	Banza 4'; Kakuta 31' (pen.); Robail 63'; Sotoca 88'; Clauss 90+5'	Report	Nicholson 54'; Costa 61'	Stadium: La Gaillette; Attendance: 0

3 September 2020 Friendly	Lens	Cancelled	Charleroi	Lens, France
13:15 CEST (UTC+2)				Stadium: La Gaillette

== Competitions ==
=== Overall record ===
Competition	First match	Last match	Starting round	Final position	Record							
Competition	First match	Last match	Starting round	Final position	Pld	W	D	L	GF	GA	GD	Win %
Ligue 1	23 August 2020	23 May 2021	Matchday 1	7th	38	15	12	11	55	54	+1	39.47
Coupe de France	10 February 2021	6 March 2021	Round of 64	Round of 32	2	1	0	1	6	5	+1	50.00
Total					40	16	12	12	61	59	+2	40.00

Last updated: 23 May 2021
Source: Soccerway

=== Ligue 1 ===
==== League table ====
Pos	Team	Pld	W	D	L	GF	GA	GD	Pts	Qualification or relegation
5	Marseille	38	16	12	10	54	47	+7	60	Qualification for the Europa League group stage (Note: Since the winners of the 2020–21 Coupe de France, Paris Saint-Germain, qualified for European competition based on league position, the Europa League group stage spot reserved for the cup winners was passed to the fifth-placed team, and the Europa Conference League play-off round spot was passed to the sixth-placed team.)
6	Rennes	38	16	10	12	52	40	+12	58	Qualification for the Europa Conference League play-off round
7	Lens	38	15	12	11	55	54	+1	57	
8	Montpellier	38	14	12	12	60	62	−2	54	
9	Nice	38	15	7	16	50	53	−3	52	

Source: Ligue 1
Rules for classification: 1) Points; 2) Goal difference; 3) Goals scored; 4) Head-to-head goal difference; 5) Fairplay ranking.

==== Results summary ====
Overall								Home						Away					
Pld	W	D	L	GF	GA	GD	Pts	W	D	L	GF	GA	GD	W	D	L	GF	GA	GD
38	15	12	11	55	54	+1	57	7	7	5	28	26	+2	8	5	6	27	28	−1

Last updated: 23 May 2021.
Source: Ligue 1

==== Results by round ====
Round	1	2	3	4	5	6	7	8	9	10	11	12	13	14	15	16	17	18	19	20	21	22	23	24	25	26	27	28	29	30	31	32	33	34	35	36	37	38
Ground	A	H	A	H	A	H	A	H	A	H	A	H	A	H	A	A	H	A	H	A	H	A	H	H	A	H	A	A	H	A	H	H	A	H	A	H	A	H
Result	L	W	W	W	D	W	L	D	W	D	W	L	W	L	W	L	W	L	L	D	L	W	D	D	D	W	D	W	D	W	D	W	D	W	L	L	L	D
Position	17	12	6	4	6	3	5	8	10	11	8	9	8	9	7	8	7	8	9	10	9	7	7	6	6	5	6	5	6	5	5	5	5	5	5	6	6	7

Source: Ligue 1
A = Away; H = Home; W = Win; D = Draw; L = Loss

==== Matches ====
The league fixtures were announced on 9 July 2020.

23 August 2020 1	Nice	2–1	Lens	Nice
17:00 CEST (UTC+2)	Dante (yellow card) 10'; Gouiri 23', 75'; Kamara (yellow card) 45+2'	Report	Kakuta 11' (pen.); Medina (yellow card) 41'; Cahuzac (yellow card) 51'; Boura (yellow card) 71'	Stadium: Allianz Riviera; Referee: Jérôme Miguelgorry

10 September 2020 2	Lens	1–0	Paris Saint-Germain	Lens
21:00 CEST (UTC+2)	Doucouré (yellow card) 44'; Ganago 57'; Sotoca (yellow card) 70'	Report	Sarabia (yellow card) 38'; Bernat (yellow card) 78'	Stadium: Stade Bollaert-Delelis; Attendance: 5,000; Referee: Hakim Ben El Hadj
Note: The match was originally scheduled for 30 August 2020, but was postponed due to the delayed conclusion of the knockout phase of the UEFA Champions League.

13 September 2020 3	Lorient	2–3	Lens	Lorient
15:00 CEST (UTC+2)	Boisgard (yellow card) 6'; Grbić 14'; Laporte (yellow card) 30'; Diarra (yellow card) 45'; Le Fée (yellow card) 65'; Wissa 90+2' (pen.)	Report	Kakuta 31' (pen.); Medina 34'; Cahuzac (yellow card) 49'; Ganago 63'; Badé (yellow card) 79' (yellow-red card) 90+1'	Stadium: Stade du Moustoir; Referee: Aurélien Petit

19 September 2020 4	Lens	2–1	Bordeaux	Lens
17:00 CEST (UTC+2)	Fortès (yellow card) 7'; Doucouré (yellow card) 21'; Medina (yellow card) 39'; Ganago 47'; Gradit (yellow card) 53'; Kakuta 59' (pen.); Jean (yellow card) 85'	Report	Otávio (yellow card) 8'; Baysse (yellow card) 18' (yellow-red card) 58'; Benito (yellow card) 76'; Kalu 90+5'; Maja (yellow card) 90+6'	Stadium: Stade Bollaert-Delelis; Referee: Benoît Millot

27 September 2020 5	Nîmes	1–1	Lens	Nîmes
15:00 CEST (UTC+2)	Ferhat 87'	Report	Gradit (yellow card) 2'; Ganago 34'; Medina (yellow card) 50'; Perez (yellow card) 90+5'	Stadium: Stade des Costières; Referee: Frank Schneider

3 October 2020 6	Lens	2–0	Saint-Étienne	Lens
17:00 CEST (UTC+2)	Kakuta 15' (pen.), (yellow card) 68'; Sotoca 82'	Report	Kolodziejczak (red card) 14'; Maçon (yellow card) 64'; Khazri (red card) 64'	Stadium: Stade Bollaert-Delelis; Referee: Bastien Dechepy

18 October 2020 7	Lille	4–0	Lens	Villeneuve-d'Ascq
21:00 CEST (UTC+2)	Yılmaz 11'; Bamba 47'; Ikoné 69'; Yazıcı 79'	Report	Cahuzac (yellow card) 18'; Gradit (yellow card) 30' (yellow-red card) 57'; Michelin (red card) 75'	Stadium: Stade Pierre-Mauroy; Referee: François Letexier

8 November 2020 10	Lens	4–4	Reims	Lens
15:00 CET (UTC+1)	Medina (yellow card) 14'; Mauricio (yellow card) 18'; Banza 21'; Badé (yellow card) 76'; Foket 77' (o.g.); Sotoca 90', 90+1'	Report	Faes (yellow card) 46'; Cafaro 47'; Dia 54', 81'; Medina 79' (o.g.)	Stadium: Stade Bollaert-Delelis; Attendance: 0 Referee: Thomas Léonard

22 November 2020 11	Dijon	0–1	Lens	Dijon
15:00 CET (UTC+1)	Chafik (yellow card) 54'; Marié (yellow card) 56'	Report	Kalimuendo 23'	Stadium: Stade Gaston Gérard; Attendance: 0 Referee: Eric Wattellier

25 November 2020 8	Lens	1–1	Nantes	Lens
19:00 CET (UTC+1)	Kakuta 27', (yellow card) 64'; Doucouré (yellow card) 37'; Gradit (yellow card) 78'; Badé (yellow card) 85'	Report	Girotto (yellow card) 7'; Kolo (yellow card) 71'; Touré 81' (pen.)	Stadium: Stade Bollaert-Delelis; Attendance: 0 Referee: Florent Batta
Note: The match was originally scheduled for 25 October 2020, but was postponed after eleven Lens players tested positive for COVID-19.

29 November 2020 12	Lens	1–3	Angers	Lens
15:00 CET (UTC+1)	Medina (yellow card) 25'; Kalimuendo 34'; Sotoca (yellow card) 83'	Report	Pereira Lage 22'; Bahoken 49'; Manceau (yellow card) 52'; Traoré (yellow card) 65'; Capelle 90+1'	Stadium: Stade Bollaert-Delelis; Attendance: 0 Referee: Aurélien Petit

5 December 2020 13	Rennes	0–2	Lens	Rennes
17:00 CET (UTC+1)	Nzonzi (yellow card) 87'	Report	Gradit (yellow card) 20'; Kalimuendo 28'; Badé (yellow card) 42'; Cahuzac (yellow card) 42'; Ganago 78'	Stadium: Roazhon Park; Attendance: 0 Referee: Johan Hamel

12 December 2020 14	Lens	2–3	Montpellier	Lens
21:00 CET (UTC+1)	Omlin 36' (o.g.); Kakuta 50' (pen.); Cahuzac (yellow card) 75'	Report	Mavididi 16'; Mendes 26', (yellow card) 38'; Laborde 69'	Stadium: Stade Bollaert-Delelis; Attendance: 0 Referee: Jérémy Stinat

16 December 2020 15	Monaco	0–3	Lens	Monaco
21:00 CET (UTC+1)	Disasi (red card) 23'; Pellegri (yellow card) 76'; Aguilar (yellow card) 89'	Report	Sylla 1'; Gradit (yellow card) 9'; Doucouré (yellow card) 11'; Banza (yellow card) 30', (goal) 33'; Kakuta 39'; Mauricio (yellow card) 80'	Stadium: Stade Louis II; Attendance: 0 Referee: Frank Schneider

19 December 2020 16	Metz	2–0	Lens	Metz
17:00 CET (UTC+1)	Nguette 30'; Boulaya (yellow card) 49', (goal) 90+5'	Report	Sotoca (yellow card) 90+3'	Stadium: Stade Saint-Symphorien; Attendance: 0 Referee: Amaury Delerue

23 December 2020 17	Lens	2–1	Brest	Lens
19:00 CET (UTC+1)	Kalimuendo 11'; Sotoca 34' (pen.)	Report	Pierre-Gabriel (yellow card) 13'; Duverne (yellow card) 32'; Charbonnier 90+3' (pen.)	Stadium: Stade Bollaert-Delelis; Attendance: 0 Referee: Bastien Dechepy

6 January 2021 18	Lyon	3–2	Lens	Décines-Charpieu
21:00 CET (UTC+1)	Depay 39', 52' (pen.); Aouar (yellow card) 40'; Fortés 46' (o.g.)	Report	Leca (yellow card) 51'; Sotoca 56'; Badé (yellow card) 85'; Doucouré 89'	Stadium: Parc Olympique Lyonnais; Attendance: 0 Referee: Eric Wattellier

9 January 2021 19	Lens	0–1	Strasbourg	Lens
21:00 CET (UTC+1)	Cahuzac (yellow card) 50'	Report	Diallo 21'; Bellegarde (yellow card) 50'	Stadium: Stade Bollaert-Delelis; Attendance: 0 Referee: Clément Turpin

17 January 2021 20	Nantes	1–1	Lens	Nantes
15:00 CET (UTC+1)	Louza 36' (pen.); Kolo (yellow card) 50'; Corchia (yellow card) 67'; Touré (yellow card) 87'	Report	Kakuta (penalty missed) 33', 81'; Gradit (yellow card) 35'; Haïdara (yellow card) 69'; Fortès (yellow card) 77'	Stadium: Stade de la Beaujoire; Attendance: 0 Referee: Frank Schneider

20 January 2021 9	Marseille	0–1	Lens	Marseille
21:00 CET (UTC+1)	Gueye (yellow card) 55'; Balerdi (yellow card) 62'; Perrin (yellow card) 69'; Khaoui (yellow card) 81'; Cuisance (yellow card) 90+1'	Report	Haïdara (yellow card) 19'; Banza (yellow card) 25', (goal) 59'; Medina (yellow card) 55'	Stadium: Stade Vélodrome; Attendance: 0 Referee: Jérémie Pignard
Note: The match was originally scheduled for 30 October 2020, but was postponed after more than ten Lens players tested positive for COVID-19.

23 January 2021 21	Lens	0–1	Nice	Lens
17:00 CET (UTC+1)	Cahuzac (yellow card) 61'; Fortès (yellow card) 68'	Report	Atal 49'; Boudaoui (yellow card) 90'	Stadium: Stade Bollaert-Delelis; Attendance: 0 Referee: Hakim Ben El Hadj

30 January 2021 22	Montpellier	1–2	Lens	Montpellier
17:00 CET (UTC+1)	Mavididi (yellow card) 15'; Mendes (yellow card) 16'; Laborde (yellow card) 18'; Hilton (yellow card) 48'; Wahi 78'	Report	Doucouré 7'; Sotoca (yellow card) 51'; Banza (yellow card) 55'; Kakuta 67'; Mauricio (yellow card) 83'; Haïdara (yellow card) 90'	Stadium: Stade de la Mosson; Attendance: 0 Referee: Amaury Delerue

3 February 2021 23	Lens	2–2	Marseille	Lens
21:00 CET (UTC+1)	Fofana (yellow card) 43'; Sotoca 46'; Doucouré (yellow card) 48'; Medina 61', (yellow card) 63'; Jean (yellow card) 90+2'	Report	Thauvin 37'; Milik 45+2'; Lirola (yellow card) 60'; Álvaro (yellow card) 90+1'	Stadium: Stade Bollaert-Delelis; Attendance: 0 Referee: Willy Delajod

6 February 2021 24	Lens	0–0	Rennes	Lens
21:00 CET (UTC+1)	Doucouré (yellow card) 46'; Cahuzac (yellow card) 90+2'	Report	Traoré (yellow card) 21'; Camavinga (yellow card) 90+1'; Martin (yellow card) 90+3'; Maouassa (yellow card) 90+4'	Stadium: Stade Bollaert-Delelis; Attendance: 0 Referee: Jérémy Stinat

13 February 2021 25	Reims	1–1	Lens	Reims
19:00 CET (UTC+1)	Zeneli 13'; Konan (yellow card) 43'; Faes (yellow card) 48'	Report	Kakuta (penalty missed) 45'; Sotoca 61'	Stadium: Stade Auguste-Delaune; Attendance: 0 Referee: Eric Wattellier

21 February 2021 26	Lens	2–1	Dijon	Lens
15:00 CET (UTC+1)	Fofana 30'; Banza 64'; Badé (yellow card) 79'; Doucouré (yellow card) 86'; Haïdara (yellow card) 88'	Report	Muzinga 61'; Kamara (red card) 74'	Stadium: Stade Bollaert-Delelis; Attendance: 0 Referee: Benoît Bastien

28 February 2021 27	Angers	2–2	Lens	Angers
15:00 CET (UTC+1)	Diony 5'; Mangani 10' (pen.)	Report	Clauss 22'; Kalimuendo 90+2'	Stadium: Stade Raymond Kopa; Attendance: 0 Referee: Bastien Dechepy

3 March 2021 28	Saint-Étienne	2–3	Lens	Saint-Étienne
19:00 CET (UTC+1)	Moukoudi (yellow card) 19', (goal) 40'; Debuchy (yellow card) 26'; Gourna-Douath (yellow card) 66'; Bouanga 90+4' (pen.)	Report	Sotoca 20' (pen.), (yellow card) 84'; Kalimuendo 24'; Banza (yellow card) 77'; Costa 90+2'	Stadium: Stade Geoffroy-Guichard; Attendance: 0 Referee: Amaury Delerue

14 March 2021 29	Lens	2–2	Metz	Lens
15:00 CET (UTC+1)	Gradit (yellow card) 8'; Clauss 13'; Haïdara (yellow card) 19'; Cahuzac 36'; Medina (yellow card) 37'; Fofana (yellow card) 86'	Report	Vagner 27' (pen.), (yellow card) 37'; Boye (yellow card) 50'; Delaine 57'; Sarr (yellow card) 82'	Stadium: Stade Bollaert-Delelis; Attendance: 0 Referee: Florent Batta

21 March 2021 30	Strasbourg	1–2	Lens	Strasbourg
13:00 CET (UTC+1)	Bellegarde 20'; Thomasson (yellow card) 42'; Sissoko (yellow card) 44'	Report	Haïdara 5'; Badé (yellow card) 19'; Fofana 40'; Medina (yellow card) 44'; Doucouré (yellow card) 86'; Jean (yellow card) 90'; Leca (yellow card) 90+4'	Stadium: Stade de la Meinau; Attendance: 0 Referee: Jérémy Stinat

3 April 2021 31	Lens	1–1	Lyon	Lens
21:00 CEST (UTC+2)	Fortès (yellow card) 6'; Clauss 65'; Sotoca (yellow card) 70'; Michelin (yellow card) 87'	Report	Bruno Guimarães (yellow card) 7'; Depay (yellow card) 48'; De Sciglio (yellow card) 79'; Paquetá 81'; Slimani (red card) 90'	Stadium: Stade Bollaert-Delelis; Attendance: 0 Referee: Benoît Millot

11 April 2021 32	Lens	4–1	Lorient	Lens
15:00 CEST (UTC+2)	Kakuta 16' (pen.); Jean 39'; Kalimuendo 55'; Banza 88' (pen.)	Report	Moffi 29'	Stadium: Stade Bollaert-Delelis; Attendance: 0 Referee: Eric Wattellier

18 April 2021 33	Brest	1–1	Lens	Brest
15:00 CEST (UTC+2)	Cahuzac 36' (o.g.); Jean Lucas (yellow card) 87' (yellow-red card) 89'	Report	Badé (yellow card) 35'; Haïdara (yellow card) 38'; Fortès (yellow card) 54' (yellow-red card) 81'; Banza (yellow card) 59' (yellow-red card) 89'; Clauss (yellow card) 63'; Kakuta 72' (pen.)	Stadium: Stade Francis-Le Blé; Attendance: 0 Referee: Karim Abed

25 April 2021 34	Lens	2–1	Nîmes	Lens
15:00 CEST (UTC+2)	Ganago 17'; Sylla (red card) 24'; Badé (yellow card) 34'; Haïdara 76'	Report	Ferhat 52' (pen.); Koné (yellow card) 81'; Miguel (yellow card) 90+1'	Stadium: Stade Bollaert-Delelis; Attendance: 0 Referee: Aurélien Petit

1 May 2021 35	Paris Saint-Germain	2–1	Lens	Paris
17:00 CEST (UTC+2)	Neymar 33'; Marquinhos 59', (yellow card) 90+1'; Herrera (yellow card) 78'; Kehrer (yellow card) 89'; Verratti (yellow card) 90+4'	Report	Ganago 61'; Medina (yellow card) 66'; Sotoca (yellow card) 76'	Stadium: Parc des Princes; Attendance: 0 Referee: Jérôme Brisard

7 May 2021 36	Lens	0–3	Lille	Lens
21:00 CEST (UTC+2)	Michelin (yellow card) 29' (yellow-red card) 35'; Fortès (yellow card) 67'	Report	Yılmaz 4' (pen.), 40'; Luiz Araújo (yellow card) 39'; David 60'; Fonte (yellow card) 65'	Stadium: Stade Bollaert-Delelis; Attendance: 0 Referee: Clément Turpin

16 May 2021 37	Bordeaux	3–0	Lens	Bordeaux
21:00 CEST (UTC+2)	Hwang 32' (pen.); Poundjé (yellow card) 82'; Sabaly 89'; Zerkane 90+1', (yellow card) 90+1'	Report	Badé (yellow card) 56'; Kakuta (yellow card) 58'	Stadium: Matmut Atlantique; Attendance: 0 Referee: Eric Wattellier

23 May 2021 38	Lens	0–0	Monaco	Lens
21:00 CEST (UTC+2)	Medina (yellow card) 74'; Clauss (yellow card) 82'; Cahuzac (yellow card) 82'	Report	Volland (yellow card) 82'; Maripán (yellow card) 85'	Stadium: Stade Bollaert-Delelis; Attendance: 0 Referee: Jérémie Pignard

=== Coupe de France ===
10 February 2021 Round of 64	Nantes	2–4	Lens	Nantes
14:45 CET (UTC+1)	Basila (yellow card) 3'; Bamba 24', 63'	Report	Jean 27', 39'; Doucouré 36'; Kalimuendo 58'	Stadium: Stade de la Beaujoire; Attendance: 0 Referee: Johan Hamel

6 March 2021 Round of 32	Red Star	3–2	Lens	Saint-Ouen-sur-Seine
14:15 CET (UTC+1)	Ba 21'; Michel 83'; Dzabana 90'	Report	Medina 29', (yellow card) 72'; Doucouré 49'	Stadium: Stade Bauer; Attendance: 0 Referee: Karim Abed

== Statistics ==
=== Appearances and goals ===
No.	Pos	Nat	Player	Total		Ligue 1		Coupe de France	
No.	Pos	Nat	Player	Apps	Goals	Apps	Goals	Apps	Goals
Goalkeepers
16	GK	(France) FRA	Jean-Louis Leca	25	0	25	0	0	0
30	GK	(Venezuela) VEN	Wuilker Faríñez	2	0	0+1	0	1	0
Defenders
3	DF	(Guinea) GUI	Issiaga Sylla	18	1	11+6	1	1	0
4	DF	(France) FRA	Loïc Badé	21	0	18+2	0	1	0
5	DF	(France) FRA	Zakaria Diallo	0	0	0	0	0	0
11	DF	(France) FRA	Jonathan Clauss	21	0	17+3	0	1	0
13	DF	(France) FRA	Clément Michelin	18	0	10+7	0	0+1	0
14	DF	(Argentina) ARG	Facundo Medina	18	2	16+1	2	0+1	0
15	DF	(Cape Verde) CPV	Steven Fortès	13	0	10+2	0	1	0
20	DF	(Mali) MLI	Cheick Traoré	0	0	0	0	0	0
21	DF	(Mali) MLI	Massadio Haïdara	15	0	14+1	0	0	0
24	DF	(France) FRA	Jonathan Gradit	22	0	21	0	1	0
35	DF	(France) FRA	Ismaël Boura	14	0	7+7	0	0	0
Midfielders
8	MF	(Ivory Coast) CIV	Seko Fofana	20	0	14+5	0	0+1	0
10	MF	(Democratic Republic of the Congo) COD	Gaël Kakuta	25	9	22+2	9	0+1	0
18	MF	(France) FRA	Yannick Cahuzac	20	0	16+3	0	1	0
22	MF	(France) FRA	Tony Mauricio	19	0	1+17	0	1	0
28	MF	(Mali) MLI	Cheick Doucouré	23	3	19+3	2	1	1
34	MF	(Portugal) POR	David Costa	2	0	0+2	0	0	0
Forwards
7	FW	(France) FRA	Florian Sotoca	25	7	22+2	7	0+1	0
9	FW	(Cameroon) CMR	Ignatius Ganago	18	5	11+7	5	0	0
23	FW	(France) FRA	Simon Banza	23	3	9+14	3	0	0
25	FW	(France) FRA	Corentin Jean	16	2	3+12	0	1	2
29	FW	(France) FRA	Arnaud Kalimuendo	18	5	7+10	4	0+1	1
Players transferred out during the season
1	GK	(France) FRA	Didier Desprez	0	0	0	0	0	0
26	DF	(Serbia) SRB	Aleksandar Radovanović	1	0	1	0	0	0
6	MF	(France) FRA	Manuel Perez	4	0	1+3	0	0	0
19	MF	(Scotland) SCO	Charles Boli	0	0	0	0	0	0
9	FW	(France) FRA	Gaëtan Robail	0	0	0	0	0	0
31	FW	(Burkina Faso) BFA	Cyrille Bayala	0	0	0	0	0	0

Last updated: 13 February 2021
Source: Competitions

=== Goalscorers ===
As of 18 October 2020

Rank	No.	Pos	Nat	Name	Ligue 1	Coupe de France	Total
1	10	MF	(Democratic Republic of the Congo)	Gaël Kakuta	4	0	4
1	27	FW	(Cameroon)	Ignatius Ganago	4	0	4
2	14	DF	(Argentina)	Facundo Medina	1	0	1
2	7	FW	(France)	Florian Sotoca	1	0	1
Totals					10	0	10
