= Clément Michelin =

French footballer (born 1997)

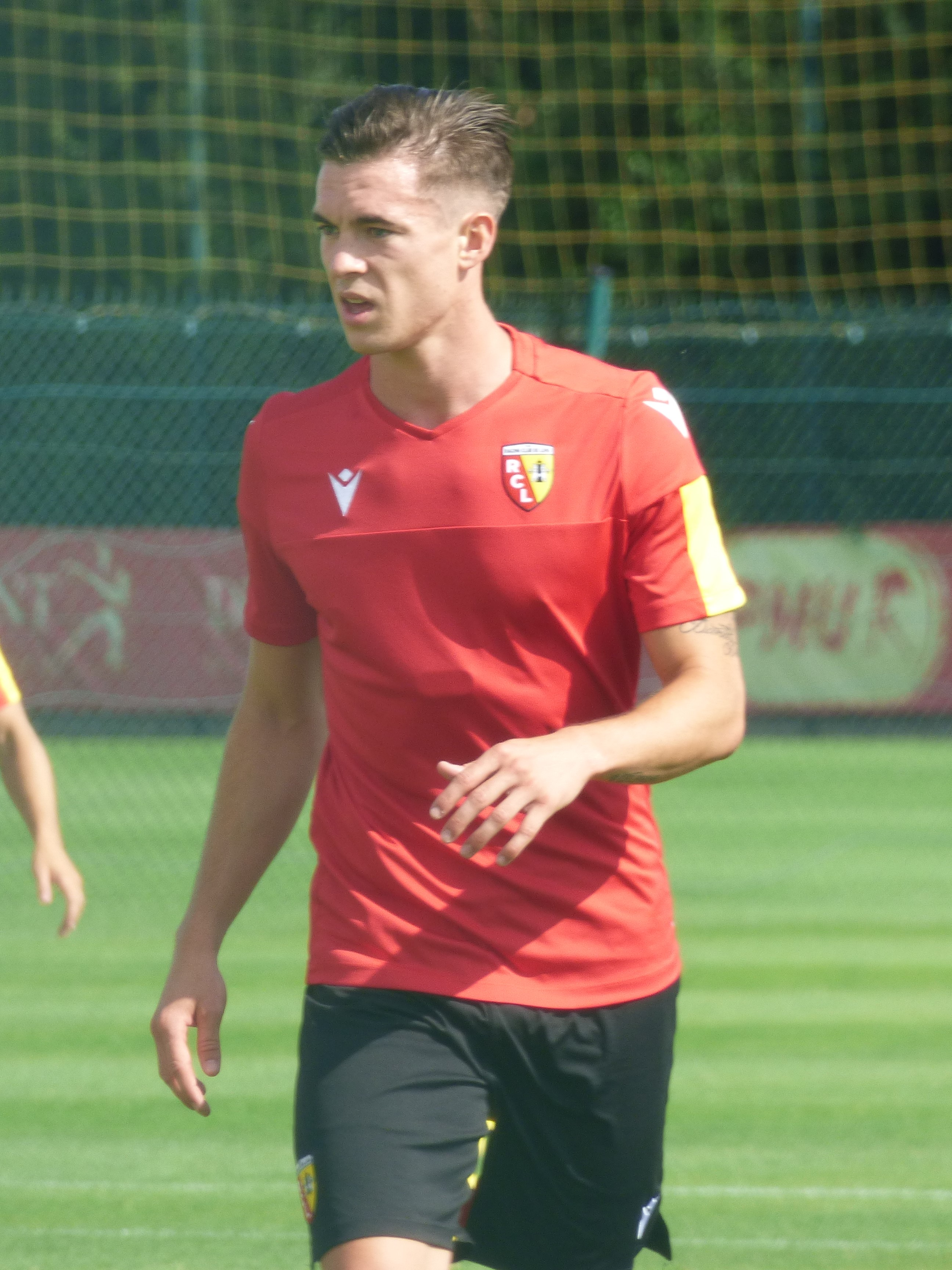
- Michelin training with Lens in 2019

Personal information
- Full name: Clément Jérôme Michelin
- Date of birth: 11 May 1997 (age 29)
- Place of birth: Montauban, France
- Height: 1.78 m (5 ft 10 in)
- Position: Right-back

Team information
- Current team: Basel
- Number: 22

Youth career
- 2003–2004: AS Savennes Verdun
- 2004–2006: Coquelicots Montechois
- 2007–2016: Toulouse

Senior career*
Years	Team	Apps	(Gls)
2014–2019	Toulouse B	36	(1)
2016–2019	Toulouse	16	(0)
2018–2019	→ Ajaccio (loan)	14	(0)
2019–2021	Lens	51	(1)
2021–2023	AEK Athens	23	(0)
2022–2023	→ Bordeaux (loan)	24	(0)
2023–2024	Bordeaux	31	(0)
2024–2026	Racing Santander	38	(2)
2026	→ Valladolid (loan)	9	(0)
2026	Valladolid	0	(0)
2026–	Basel	2	(0)

International career
2013–2014	France U17	6	(1)
2015	France U18	2	(0)
2016	France U19	10	(0)
2016–2018	France U20	9	(0)
2021	France Olympic	4	(0)
- * Club domestic league appearances and goals as of 20 September 2026

Clément Jérôme Michelin (born 11 May 1997) is a French professional footballer who plays as a right-back for Swiss Super League club Basel. He previously represented France at under-17, under-18, under-19, under-20, and Olympic level.

== Career ==
=== Toulouse ===
Michelin made his debut for Ligue 1 side Toulouse on 20 September 2016 against Lille, replacing Issiaga Sylla after 61 minutes in a 2–1 away win.

=== Lens ===
On 11 June 2019, Michelin signed a three-year contract with French club Lens.

=== AEK Athens ===
On 5 August 2021, Michelin signed a four-year contract with Greek club AEK Athens.

=== Racing Santander ===
On 5 August 2024, after a two-year spell at Bordeaux, Michelin joined Spanish Segunda División side Racing de Santander on a two-year deal.

=== Valladolid ===
On 2 February 2026, Michelin was loaned to fellow second division side Real Valladolid until June. On 9 June, he signed a permanent two-year deal with the club, but terminated his link on 1 September.

=== Basel ===
On 8 September 2026, Michelin signed a two-season contract with Basel in Switzerland.

== Career statistics ==
As of match played 3 May 2024

Appearances and goals by club, season and competition
Club	Season	League			National cup		League cup		Total	
Club	Season	Division	Apps	Goals	Apps	Goals	Apps	Goals	Apps	Goals
Toulouse	2016–17	Ligue 1	8	0	1	0	1	0	10	0
Toulouse	2017–18	Ligue 1	7	0	1	0	2	0	10	0
Toulouse	2018–19	Ligue 1	1	0	—		—		1	0
Toulouse	Total		16	0	2	0	3	0	21	0
Ajaccio (loan)	2018–19	Ligue 2	14	0	1	0	—		15	0
Lens	2019–20	Ligue 2	25	1	1	0	0	0	26	1
Lens	2020–21	Ligue 1	26	0	2	0	0	0	28	0
Lens	Total		51	1	3	0	0	0	54	1
AEK Athens	2021–22	Super League Greece	23	0	1	0	—		24	0
Bordeaux (loan)	2022–23	Ligue 2	24	0	3	0	—		27	0
Bordeaux	2023–24	Ligue 2	31	0	2	0	—		33	0
Career total			159	3	12	0	3	0	174	1

== Honours ==
France U19

- UEFA European Under-19 Championship: 2016
