= Simon Banza =

DR Congolese footballer (born 1996)

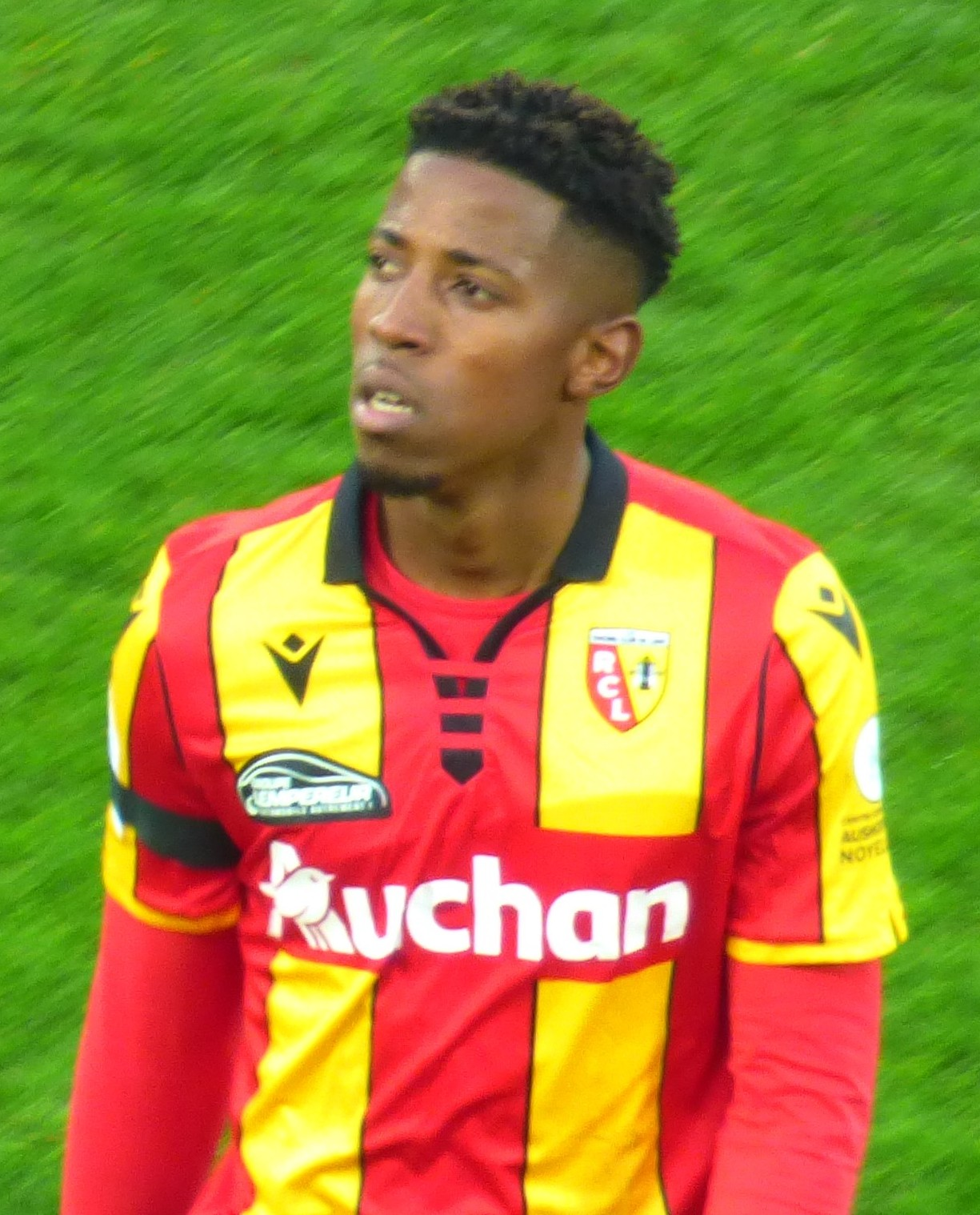
- Banza with Lens in 2019

Personal information
- Full name: Simon Bokoté Banza
- Date of birth: 13 August 1996 (age 30)
- Place of birth: Creil, France
- Height: 1.89 m (6 ft 2 in)
- Position: Forward

Team information
- Current team: PAOK (on loan from Al Jazira)
- Number: 24

Youth career
- US Chantilly
- Liévin
- Lens

Senior career*
Years	Team	Apps	(Gls)
2014–2019	Lens B	56	(10)
2015–2022	Lens	86	(15)
2017	→ Béziers (loan)	11	(0)
2017–2018	→ UT Pétange (loan)	21	(13)
2021–2022	→ Famalicão (loan)	29	(14)
2022–2025	Braga	59	(32)
2024–2025	→ Trabzonspor (loan)	31	(19)
2025–	Al Jazira	19	(10)
2026–	→ PAOK (loan)	3	(2)

International career^{‡}
2023–	DR Congo	18	(2)
- * Club domestic league appearances and goals as of 01:05, 26 October 2026 (UTC) ‡ National team caps and goals as of 19:05, 28 September 2026 (UTC)

Simon Bokoté Banza (born 13 August 1996) is a professional footballer who plays as a forward for Super League Greece club PAOK, on loan from Al Jazira. Born in France, he plays for the DR Congo national team.

Formed at Lens, where he played 98 games and scored 16 goals including in Ligue 1 and Ligue 2, he went on to play in Portugal's Primeira Liga for Famalicão and Braga. Shortly after making his senior international debut, he was chosen for the 2023 Africa Cup of Nations.

== Club career ==
=== Lens ===
Born in Creil, Oise, Banza began his senior career with Lens, first with its reserve team in the fourth tier. He scored his first Ligue 2 goal on 6 May 2016, as consolation at the end of a 2–1 loss at Bourg-en-Bresse.

In January 2017, Banza was loaned to Championnat National club Béziers until the end of the season. That August, he moved to UT Pétange of the Luxembourg National Division in the same manner. He was the season's sixth highest scorer with 13 goals, including a hat-trick in a 4–1 home win over Esch on 15 April 2018.

On 24 May 2019, Banza scored the extra-time winner as Lens won 2–1 at Troyes in the second leg of the play-off semi-finals. The following season, he scored seven times as Lens won promotion as runners-up, including two on 3 December 2019 in a 3–0 home win over his local side Chambly. He was sent off 18 days later in a 1–0 win over Niort also at the Stade Bollaert-Delelis.

=== Famalicão ===
On 31 August 2021, Banza joined Famalicão in Portugal on loan for the 2021–22 season. On his Primeira Liga debut 12 days later, he scored twice in a 2–2 draw at Moreirense; he added both goals of a win at Santa Clara on 23 October, though he was also sent off. He finished the season as joint seventh top scorer with 14 goals in 29 games, including two on the final day in a 3–2 home comeback win over neighbours Braga to ensure a top-half finish.

=== Braga ===
On 19 July 2022, Banza signed a five-year deal with Braga for a €3 million fee, complete with a buyout clause of €30 million. He made his debut on 7 August in the season opener at home to Sporting CP, scoring his club's first goal of a 3–3 draw; five days later he added two more goals in a 3–0 win on his return to Famalicão. In the 2023–24 season, he managed to score 21 goals in the Primeira Liga, equalling his club's top scorer in a single campaign, Chico Gordo in the 1977–78 season.

==== Trabzonspor ====
On 13 September 2024, Banza signed for Turkish club Trabzonspor on a one-year loan deal.

==== Al Jazira ====
On 22 September 2025, Banza signed for Emirati club Al Jazira.

== International career ==
Banza was born in France to DR Congolese parents. On 2 October 2023, he was called up to the DR Congo national team for a set of friendlies. He made his debut 11 days later in a 1–1 draw with New Zealand in Murcia, Spain, playing the final 11 minutes as a substitute for Cédric Bakambu. He was chosen for the 2023 Africa Cup of Nations at the start of the following year, in the Ivory Coast.

On May 19, 2026, he was included in the 26-man squad selected by head coach Sébastien Desabre to represent the DR Congo at the 2026 FIFA World Cup.

== Career statistics ==
=== Club ===
As of match played 29 August 2026

Appearances and goals by club, season and competition
Club	Season	League			National cup (Note: Includes Coupe de France, Luxembourg Cup, Taça de Portugal, Turkish Cup, UAE President's Cup)		League cup (Note: Includes Coupe de la Ligue, Taça da Liga, UAE League Cup)		Continental		Other		Total	
Club	Season	Division	Apps	Goals	Apps	Goals	Apps	Goals	Apps	Goals	Apps	Goals	Apps	Goals
Lens II	2014–15	CFA	26	1	—		—		—		—		26	1
Lens II	2015–16	CFA	13	5	—		—		—		—		13	5
Lens II	2016–17	CFA	10	2	—		—		—		—		10	2
Lens II	2018–19	Championnat National 2	7	2	—		—		—		—		7	2
Lens II	Total		56	10	—		—		—		—		56	10
Lens	2015–16	Ligue 2	18	1	—		—		—		—		18	1
Lens	2016–17	Ligue 2	1	0	2	1	2	0	—		—		5	1
Lens	2018–19	Ligue 2	5	1	0	0	0	0	—		4 (Note: Appearances in Ligue 1 relegation/promotion play-offs)	1	9	2
Lens	2019–20	Ligue 2	24	7	1	0	3	1	—		—		28	8
Lens	2020–21	Ligue 1	34	5	1	0	—		—		—		35	5
Lens	2021–22	Ligue 1	4	1	0	0	—		—		—		4	1
Lens	Total		86	15	4	1	5	1	—		4	1	99	18
Béziers (loan)	2016–17	Championnat National	11	0	—		—		—		—		11	0
UT Pétange (loan)	2017–18	Luxembourg National Division	21	13	4	5	—		—		—		25	18
Famalicão (loan)	2021–22	Primeira Liga	29	14	3	2	1	1	—		—		33	17
Braga	2022–23	Primeira Liga	30	11	7	2	3	1	7 (Note: Five appearances in UEFA Europa League, two appearances in UEFA Europa Conference League)	0	—		47	14
Braga	2023–24	Primeira Liga	28	21	0	0	2	0	11 (Note: Nine appearances in UEFA Champions League, two appearances and two goals in UEFA Europa League)	2	—		41	23
Braga	2024–25	Primeira Liga	1	0	0	0	0	0	1 (Note: Appearance in UEFA Europa League)	0	—		2	0
Braga	Total		59	32	7	2	5	1	19	2	—		90	37
Trabzonspor (loan)	2024–25	Süper Lig	31	19	6	3	—		—		—		37	22
Al Jazira	2025–26	UAE Pro League	16	9	2	0	2	0	—		—		20	9
Al Jazira	2026–27	UAE Pro League	3	1	0	0	0	0	1 (Note: Appearance in AFC Champions League Elite)	1	—		4	2
Al Jazira	Total		19	10	2	0	2	0	1	1	—		24	11
PAOK (loan)	2026–27	Super League Greece	0	0	0	0	—		0	0	—		0	0
Career total			307	112	25	13	13	3	20	3	4	1	369	132

=== International ===
As of match played 28 September 2026

Appearances and goals by national team and year
National team	Year	Apps	Goals
DR Congo	2023	3	0
DR Congo	2024	9	0
DR Congo	2025	6	2
Total		18	2

Scores and results list DR Congo's goal tally first, score column indicates score after each Banza goal.

List of international goals scored by Simon Banza
No.	Date	Venue	Cap	Opponent	Score	Result	Competition
1	8 June 2025	Stade de la Source, Orléans, France	14	Madagascar	1–0	3–1	Friendly
2	8 June 2025	Stade de la Source, Orléans, France	14	Madagascar	2–0	3–1	Friendly

== Honours ==
Braga

- Taça da Liga: 2023–24

Individual

- Primeira Liga Player of the Month: August 2022
