= Massadio Haïdara =

Footballer (born 1992)

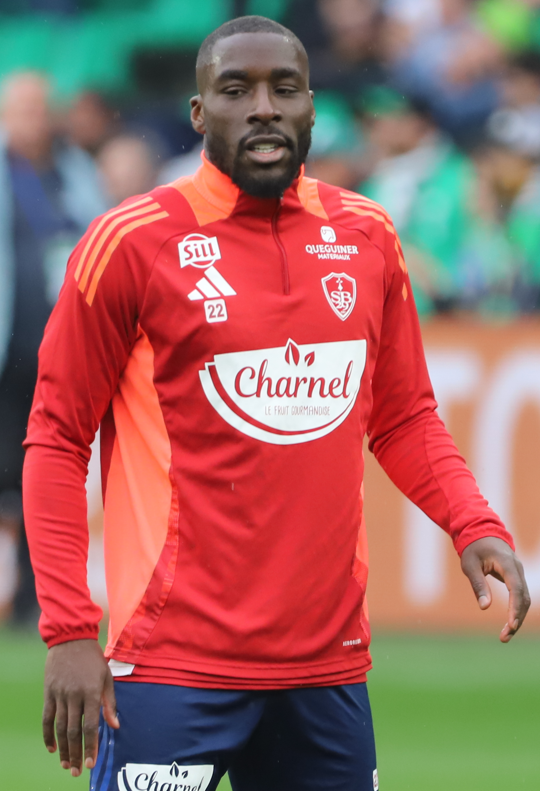
- Haïdara with Brest in 2025

Personal information
- Date of birth: 2 December 1992 (age 33)
- Place of birth: Trappes, Yvelines, France
- Height: 1.79 m (5 ft 10 in)
- Position: Left-back

Team information
- Current team: Kocaelispor
- Number: 21

Youth career
- 2002–2003: La Verrière
- 2003–2005: Versailles
- 2005–2008: Boulogne-Billancourt
- 2008–2010: Nancy

Senior career*
Years	Team	Apps	(Gls)
2010–2012	Nancy B	15	(1)
2010–2013	Nancy	46	(0)
2013–2018	Newcastle United	39	(0)
2018–2024	Lens	151	(4)
2020–2024	Lens B	2	(0)
2024–2025	Brest	22	(0)
2025–	Kocaelispor	26	(1)

International career^{‡}
2011	France U19	4	(0)
2011–2012	France U20	2	(0)
2012	France U21	2	(0)
2019–	Mali	18	(2)
- * Club domestic league appearances and goals as of 29 August 2026 ‡ National team caps and goals as of 20 November 2023

Massadio Haïdara (born 2 December 1992) is a professional footballer who plays as a left-back for Turkish Süper Lig club Kocaelispor. Born in France, he plays for the Mali national team.

== Club career ==
=== Nancy ===
Haïdara made his professional debut on 11 December 2010 in a league match against Sochaux. On 10 January 2011, he signed his first professional contract after agreeing to a three-year deal with Nancy.

=== Newcastle United ===
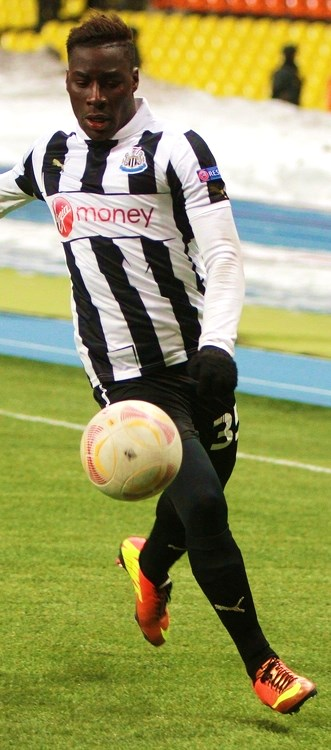
Haïdara playing for Newcastle United in 2013

On 25 January 2013, Haïdara signed for English club Newcastle United of the Premier League for an undisclosed fee (reportedly £2 million) to become Newcastle's ninth first-team player with French nationality and fourth of five French players signed in the January 2013 transfer window. He made his debut for Newcastle on 21 February 2013 in the Europa League against Metalist Kharkiv.

Haïdara came on as a first-half substitute in the match against Wigan Athletic on 17 March 2013. A few minutes later, he was stretchered off as a result of a knee-high tackle on him by Callum McManaman and taken to hospital; and returned to first-team action on 11 April against Benfica. Referee Mark Halsey did not see the incident, so McManaman received no card, and because one of his assistants did see it, albeit not clearly, the Football Association were unable to act. At the end of the season, their rules were changed to permit retrospective action "when match officials are not in a position to fully assess a 'coming together' of players."

He made his first league appearance of the 2016–17 season against Barnsley on 7 May 2017, the day that Newcastle clinched the Championship title. The following season he also had to wait until the final game of the season to make his first league appearance, this time against Chelsea.

=== Lens ===
In July 2018, after his contract with Newcastle United expired, Haïdara signed on a free transfer for French club Lens of the Ligue 2, the second-tier French league.

=== Brest ===
On 30 August 2024, Haïdara signed for Ligue 1 club Brest for no transfer fee.

=== Kocaelispor ===
On 3 July 2025, he signed for Turkish club Kocaelispor.

== International career ==
Haïdara has represented France at U21 level. On 9 November 2018, he was called up to the Mali senior national team. He made his debut for Mali on 26 March 2019 in a friendly against Senegal, as a starter.

In June 2019, Haidara was named in the list of 23 Malian players selected to participate in the 2019 Africa Cup of Nations.

Expected at 2023 Africa Cup of Nations, he injured himself in the morning of the announcement of the list of players selected for the competition by coach Eric Chelle and was therefore absent from it.

== Career statistics ==
=== Club ===
As of match played 24 January 2026

Appearances and goals by club, season and competition
Club	Season	League			National cup (Note: Includes Coupe de France, FA Cup)		League cup (Note: Includes Coupe de la Ligue, EFL Cup)		Europe		Other		Total	
Club	Season	Division	Apps	Goals	Apps	Goals	Apps	Goals	Apps	Goals	Apps	Goals	Apps	Goals
Nancy	2010–11	Ligue 1	10	0	3	0	0	0	—		—		13	0
Nancy	2011–12	Ligue 1	19	0	0	0	1	0	—		—		20	0
Nancy	2012–13	Ligue 1	17	0	1	0	0	0	—		—		18	0
Nancy	Total		46	0	4	0	1	0	0	0	0	0	51	0
Newcastle United	2012–13	Premier League	4	0	0	0	0	0	4 (Note: Appearances in UEFA Europa League)	0	—		8	0
Newcastle United	2013–14	Premier League	11	0	1	0	1	0	—		—		13	0
Newcastle United	2014–15	Premier League	15	0	1	0	4	0	—		—		20	0
Newcastle United	2015–16	Premier League	7	0	1	0	0	0	—		—		8	0
Newcastle United	2016–17	Championship	1	0	2	0	0	0	—		—		3	0
Newcastle United	2017–18	Premier League	1	0	1	0	0	0	—		—		2	0
Newcastle United	Total		39	0	6	0	4	0	4	0	0	0	53	0
Lens	2018–19	Ligue 2	32	0	1	0	1	0	—		2 (Note: Appearances in Ligue 2 promotion play-offs)	0	36	0
Lens	2019–20	Ligue 2	20	1	1	0	1	0	—		—		22	1
Lens	2020–21	Ligue 1	25	2	1	0	—		—		—		26	2
Lens	2021–22	Ligue 1	20	1	1	0	—		—		—		21	1
Lens	2022–23	Ligue 1	36	0	1	0	—		—		—		37	0
Lens	2023–24	Ligue 1	18	0	0	0	—		6 (Note: Four appearances in UEFA Champions League, two appearances in UEFA Europa League)	0	—		24	0
Lens	2024–25	Ligue 1	0	0	0	0	—		1 (Note: Appearances in UEFA Conference League)	0	—		1	0
Lens	Total		151	4	5	0	2	0	7	0	2	0	167	4
Brest	2024–25	Ligue 1	22	0	1	0	—		8 (Note: Appearances in UEFA Champions League)	0	—		31	0
Kocaelispor	2025–26	Süper Lig	12	0	0	0	—		—		—		12	0
Career total			270	4	15	0	7	0	19	0	2	0	313	4

=== International ===
As of match played 20 November 2023

Appearances and goals by national team and year
National team	Year	Apps	Goals
Mali	2019	4	0
Mali	2020	2	0
Mali	2022	6	2
Mali	2023	4	0
Total		18	2

== Honours ==
Newcastle United

- EFL Championship: 2016–17
