= Cheick Doucouré =

Malian footballer (born 2000)

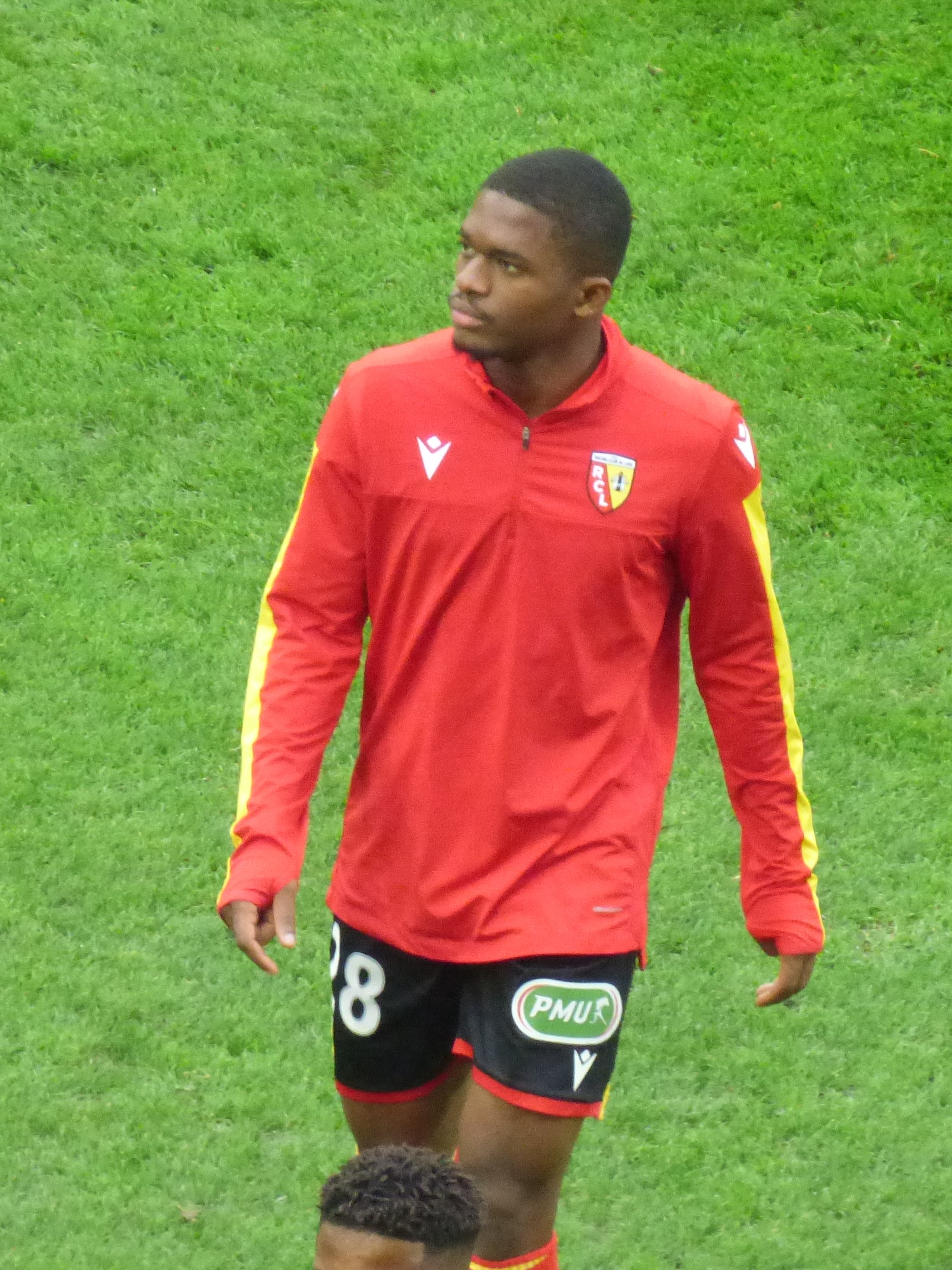
- Doucouré with Lens in 2019

Personal information
- Full name: Cheick Oumar Doucouré
- Date of birth: 8 January 2000 (age 26)
- Place of birth: Bamako, Mali
- Height: 1.80 m (5 ft 11 in)
- Position: Central midfielder

Team information
- Current team: Crystal Palace
- Number: 28

Youth career
- 2009–2017: JMG Academy Bamako
- 2016–2018: Real Bamako
- 2018: Lens

Senior career*
Years	Team	Apps	(Gls)
2018–2019	Lens II	5	(0)
2018–2022	Lens	115	(6)
2022–	Crystal Palace	58	(0)

International career
2017	Mali U17	7	(0)
2018–2023	Mali	14	(0)
- * Club domestic league appearances and goals as of 15 January 2025 (UTC)

Cheick Oumar Doucouré (born 8 January 2000) is a Malian professional footballer who plays as a central midfielder for Premier League club Crystal Palace. He has played internationally for the Mali national team.

== Club career ==
=== Lens ===
Doucouré developed as a youth player at JMG Academy Bamako. He then spent the 2016–17 season with Real Bamako before moving the following season to Lens. Doucouré quickly cemented his place at Lens in the 2018–19 Ligue 2 campaign with him playing a total of 34 games across all competitions that season.

=== Crystal Palace ===
On 11 July 2022, Doucouré was signed by English club Crystal Palace on a five-year contract. In his first season, he was named the club's Player of the Year.

On 25 November 2023, Doucouré sustained an Achilles injury in a 2–1 loss to Luton Town, which ruled him out for the rest of the 2023–24 season. On 28 February 2024, he extended his contract with Palace until 2029.

Doucouré returned to the first-team at the start of the 2024–25 season, making 14 appearances before suffering a knee injury in early January 2025. He underwent surgery and was ruled out for the remainder of the campaign, and also the following season as he continued his rehabilitation.

Doucouré eventually returned to make his first competitive appearance for the first-team in nearly 20 months, starting in an EFL Cup tie against Fulham on the 28 October 2026.

== International career ==
After representing Mali at youth level, Doucouré received his first call-up to the senior Mali national team in October 2018. He made his debut in a 1–0 2019 Africa Cup of Nations qualification win over Gabon on 17 November 2018.

== Style of play ==
Throughout his early career, Doucouré often played as a lone defensive midfielder in a four-man or three-man midfield set-up, but at Palace he has adapted to become a central midfielder who can combine both defensive and attacking responsibilities equally.

== Career statistics ==
=== Club ===
As of match played 28 October 2026

Appearances and goals by club, season and competition
Club	Season	League			National cup (Note: Includes Coupe de France, FA Cup)		League cup (Note: Includes Coupe de la Ligue, EFL Cup)		Europe		Other		Total	
Club	Season	Division	Apps	Goals	Apps	Goals	Apps	Goals	Apps	Goals	Apps	Goals	Apps	Goals
Lens II	2017–18	Championnat National 2	4	0	—		—		—		—		4	0
Lens II	2019–20	Championnat National 2	1	0	—		—		—		—		1	0
Lens II	Total		5	0	—		—		—		—		5	0
Lens	2018–19	Ligue 2	27	2	2	0	2	0	—		4 (Note: Appearances in Ligue 2 promotion play-offs)	0	35	2
Lens	2019–20	Ligue 2	21	1	1	0	2	0	—		—		24	1
Lens	2020–21	Ligue 1	33	2	2	2	—		—		—		35	4
Lens	2021–22	Ligue 1	34	1	3	0	—		—		—		37	1
Lens	Total		115	6	8	2	4	0	—		4	0	131	8
Crystal Palace	2022–23	Premier League	34	0	1	0	0	0	—		—		35	0
Crystal Palace	2023–24	Premier League	11	0	0	0	1	0	—		—		12	0
Crystal Palace	2024–25	Premier League	13	0	0	0	1	0	—		—		14	0
Crystal Palace	2025–26	Premier League	0	0	0	0	0	0	0	0	0	0	0	0
Crystal Palace	2026–27	Premier League	0	0	0	0	1	0	0	0	—		1	0
Crystal Palace	Total		58	0	1	0	3	0	0	0	0	0	62	0
Career total			178	6	9	2	7	0	0	0	4	0	198	8

=== International ===
As of match played 17 November 2023

Appearances and goals by national team and year
National team	Year	Apps	Goals
Mali	2018	1	0
Mali	2019	4	0
Mali	2020	2	0
Mali	2021	1	0
Mali	2022	2	0
Mali	2023	4	0
Total		14	0

== Honours ==
Crystal Palace

- FA Cup: 2024–25
- UEFA Conference League: 2025–26

Individual

- Crystal Palace Player of the Season: 2022–23
