= Corentin Jean =

French footballer (born 1995)

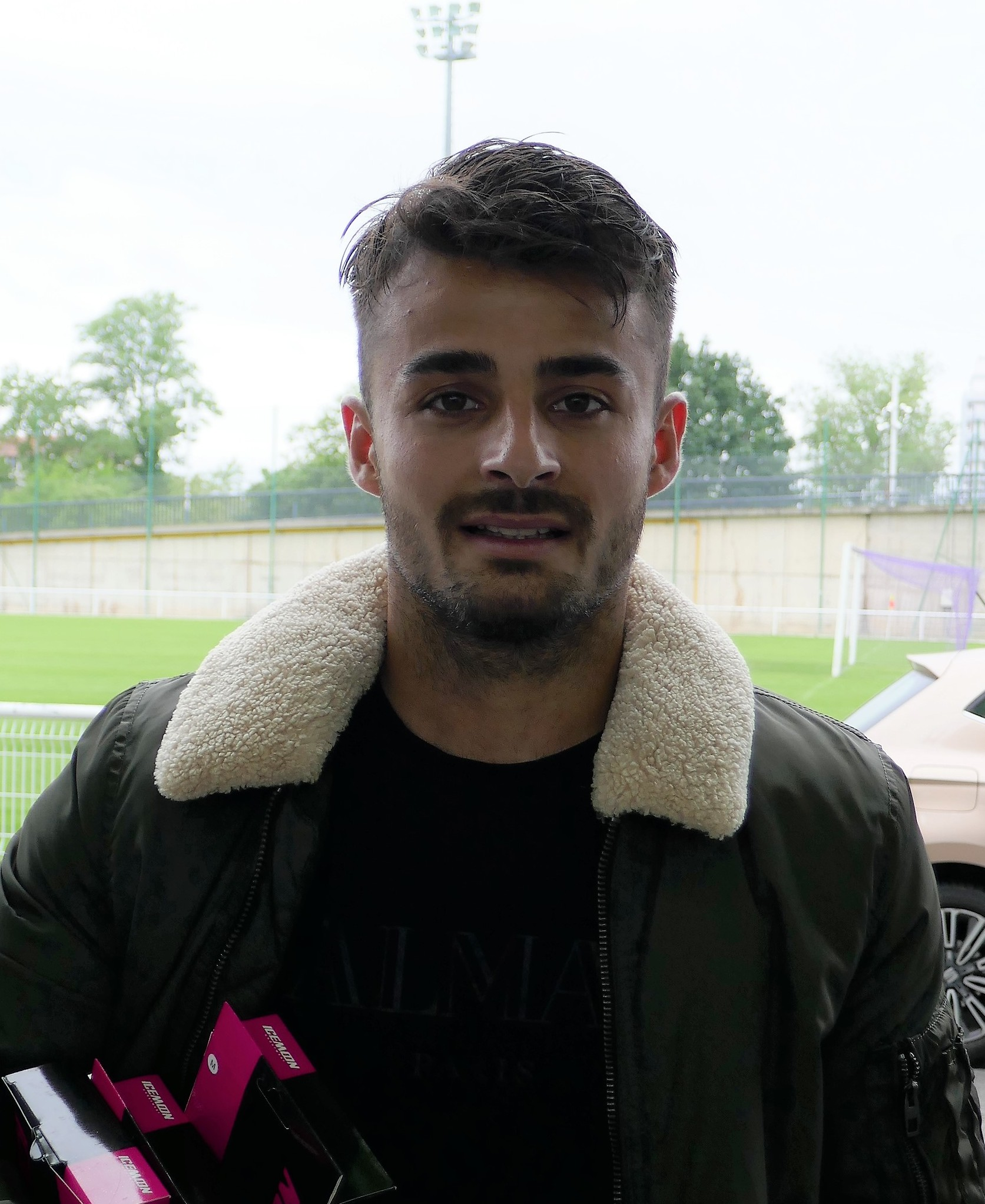
- Jean in 2018

Personal information
- Date of birth: 15 July 1995 (age 31)
- Place of birth: Blois, France
- Height: 1.70 m (5 ft 7 in)
- Position: Striker

Team information
- Current team: Châteauroux
- Number: 13

Youth career
- 2001–2008: US Chemery Mehers St Romain
- 2008–2010: Blois
- 2010–2012: Troyes

Senior career*
Years	Team	Apps	(Gls)
2012–2014	Troyes B	10	(1)
2012–2015	Troyes	65	(17)
2015–2017	Monaco	2	(0)
2015–2016	→ Troyes (loan)	34	(4)
2016–2017	→ Toulouse (loan)	16	(1)
2017–2020	Toulouse	53	(1)
2019–2020	Toulouse B	2	(1)
2020	→ Lens (loan)	9	(3)
2020–2022	Lens	40	(2)
2021	Lens B	1	(2)
2022–2024	Inter Miami	18	(1)
2024	Inter Miami II	2	(1)
2024–2025	Sochaux	23	(3)
2025–	Châteauroux	11	(1)

International career
2011	France U16	1	(0)
2011–2012	France U17	12	(2)
2012–2013	France U18	6	(1)
2013	France U19	6	(2)
2014	France U20	2	(0)
2015–2016	France U21	8	(0)
- * Club domestic league appearances and goals as of 23 June 2026

Corentin Jean (born 15 July 1995) is a French professional footballer who plays as a striker for Championnat National 1 club Châteauroux.

== Club career ==
=== Troyes ===
Born in Blois, France, Jean made his full debut for Troyes in the Coupe de la Ligue against Rennes. He immediately made an impact with scoring his first professional goal for the club. However, after a late-minute goal from Romain Alessandrini Stade Rennais finally won the game with 2–1. He scored just two minutes after goal-scoring Jean was replaced for Mohamed Yattara.

=== Monaco ===
On 2 July 2015, Jean signed for Monaco. He was loaned out to Troyes for the 2015–16 Ligue 1 season.

=== Toulouse ===
Jean signed for Toulouse for the 2016–17 Ligue 1 season on loan, he later joined them on a permanent transfer the following season.

=== Lens ===
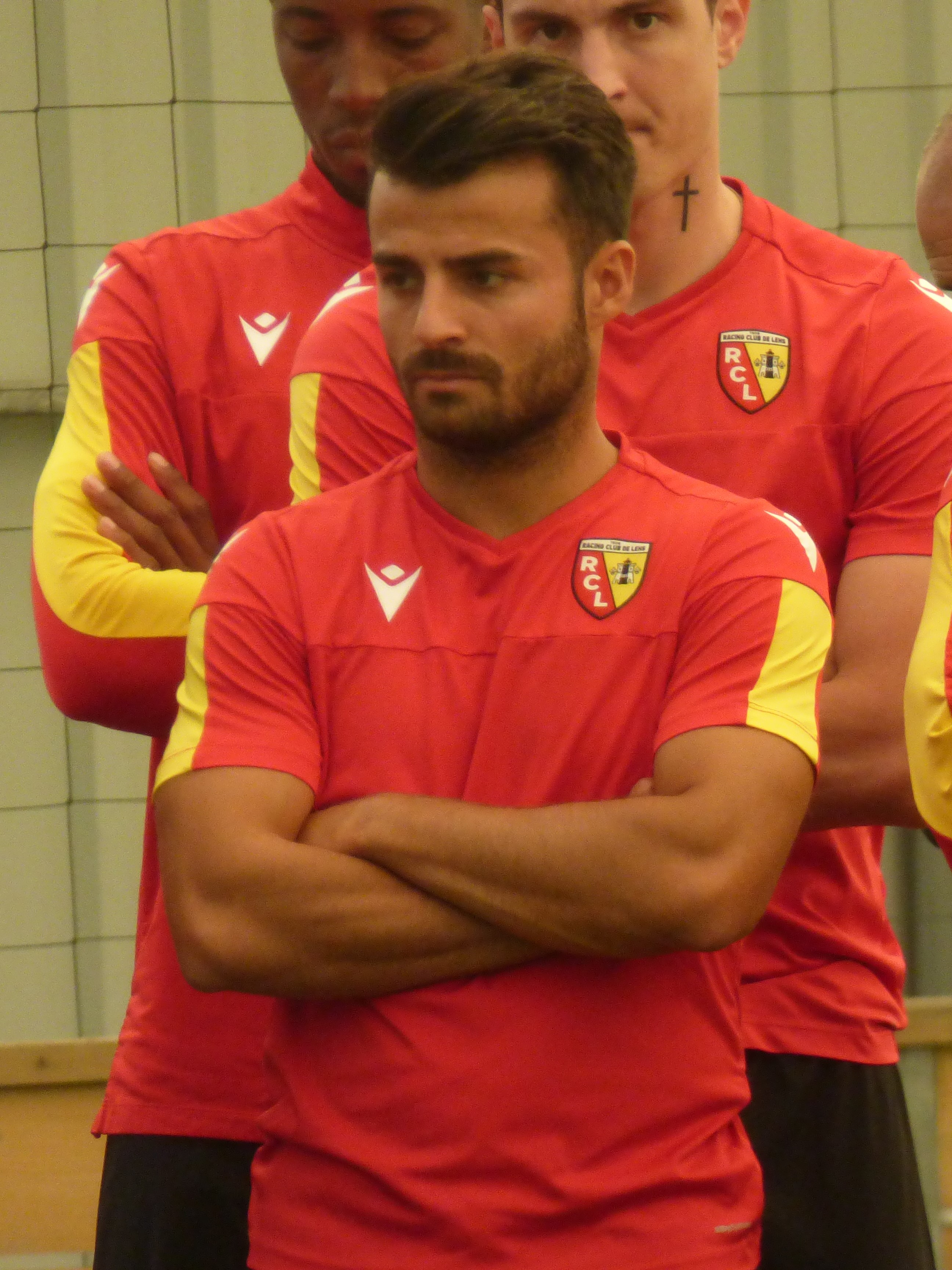
Jean with RC Lens in 2020

On 1 January 2020, Jean signed for Lens on loan for the season of the 2019–20 Ligue 2 season with an option to buy in the summer. He made his debut on 18 January 2020 against Guingamp in Ligue 2. He was subbed on for Tony Mauricio in the 66th minute. On 6 June 2020, Jean completed a permanent transfer to Lens, for a fee of €1 million. He signed a three-year contract.

=== Inter Miami ===
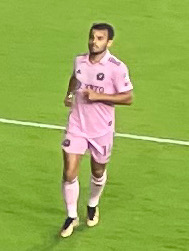
Jean with Inter Miami in 2023

On 29 June 2022, Jean signed for Major League Soccer club Inter Miami on a contract until the end of the 2024 season, with club options for the 2025 and 2026 seasons. On 20 February 2024, Miami opted to buyout Jean's contract with the club.

=== Sochaux ===
On 30 August 2024, Jean joined Sochaux in Championnat National on a one-year deal, with an option for second year.

== Career statistics ==
As of match played 1 September 2022

Appearances and goals by club, season and competition
Club	Season	League			National cup		League cup		Continental		Other		Total	
Club	Season	Division	Apps	Goals	Apps	Goals	Apps	Goals	Apps	Goals	Apps	Goals	Apps	Goals
Troyes B	2012–13	CFA 2	7	1	—		—		—		—		7	1
Troyes B	2013–14	CFA 2	2	0	—		—		—		—		2	0
Troyes B	2014–15	CFA	1	0	—		—		—		—		1	0
Troyes B	Total		10	1	—		—		—		—		10	1
Troyes	2012–13	Ligue 1	15	3	1	0	1	1	—		—		17	4
Troyes	2013–14	Ligue 2	22	4	1	0	5	0	—		—		28	4
Troyes	2014–15	Ligue 2	28	10	1	0	2	0	—		—		31	10
Troyes	Total		65	17	3	0	8	1	—		—		76	18
Troyes (loan)	2015–16	Ligue 1	34	4	2	2	1	0	—		—		37	6
Monaco	2016–17	Ligue 1	2	0	0	0	2	1	1 (Note: Appearance in the UEFA Champions League)	0	—		5	1
Toulouse (loan)	2016–17	Ligue 1	16	1	0	0	0	0	—		—		16	1
Toulouse	2017–18	Ligue 1	33	1	2	0	3	0	—		1 (Note: Appearance in the Ligue 1 relegation/promotion play-offs)	0	39	1
Toulouse	2018–19	Ligue 1	19	0	3	0	1	0	—		—		23	0
Toulouse	2019–20	Ligue 1	1	0	0	0	0	0	—		—		1	0
Toulouse	Total		53	1	5	0	4	0	—		1	0	63	1
Toulouse B	2019–20	National 3	2	1	—		—		—		—		2	1
Lens (loan)	2019–20	Ligue 2	9	3	0	0	0	0	—		—		9	3
Lens	2020–21	Ligue 1	23	1	2	2	—		—		—		25	3
Lens	2021–22	Ligue 1	17	1	3	0	—		—		—		20	1
Lens	Total		40	2	5	2	—		—		—		45	4
Lens B	2021–22	National 2	1	2	—		—		—		—		1	2
Inter Miami	2022	MLS	3	0	—		—		—		—		3	0
Inter Miami	2023	MLS	15	1	—		2	2	—		—		17	3
Inter Miami	Total		19	3	—		2	2	—		—		21	5
Inter Miami II	2024	MLS Next Pro	2	1	—		—		—		—		2	1
FC Sochaux	2024-25	Championnat National	10	2	—		—		—		—		10	2
Career total			266	38	15	4	17	4	1	0	1	0	300	46

== Honours ==
Troyes

- Ligue 2: 2014–15

Monaco

- Ligue 1: 2016–17
