= Steven Fortès =

French footballer (born 1992)

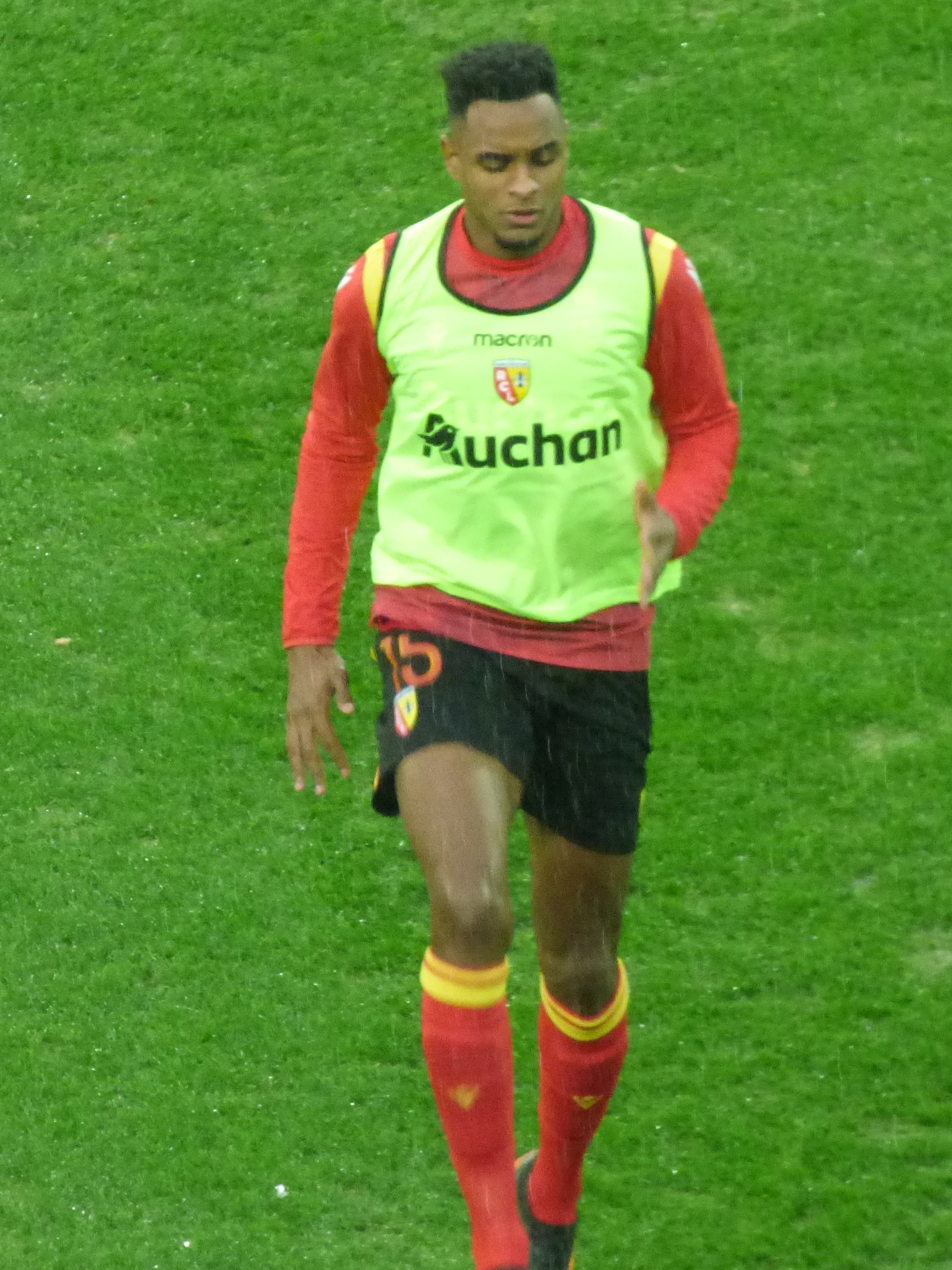
- Fortes warming up with Lens in 2021

Personal information
- Date of birth: 17 April 1992 (age 34)
- Place of birth: Marseille, France
- Height: 1.92 m (6 ft 4 in)
- Position: Centre-back

Senior career*
| Years | Team | Apps | (Gls) |
| 2011–2012 | SCO La Cayolle | | |
| 2012–2013 | Arles-Avignon B | | |
| 2013–2014 | Arles-Avignon | 26 | (0) |
| 2014–2017 | Le Havre | 86 | (2) |
| 2017–2019 | Toulouse | 5 | (0) |
| 2019 | → Lens (loan) | 18 | (0) |
| 2019–2023 | Lens | 35 | (0) |
| 2022 | Lens B | 2 | (0) |
| 2021–2022 | → Oostende (loan) | 17 | (0) |
| 2023–2024 | Quevilly-Rouen B | 3 | (0) |
| 2023–2024 | Quevilly-Rouen | 11 | (0) |
| 2025 | Lens B | 7 | (0) |

International career
| 2015–2022 | Cape Verde | 13 | (0) |
- * Club domestic league appearances and goals as of 8 October 2025

Steven Fortès (born 17 April 1992) is a professional footballer who plays as a centre-back. Born in France, he represents Cape Verde at international level.

== Club career ==
Born in Marseille, Fortès played club football in France for SCO La Cayolle, Arles-Avignon B, Arles-Avignon and Le Havre.

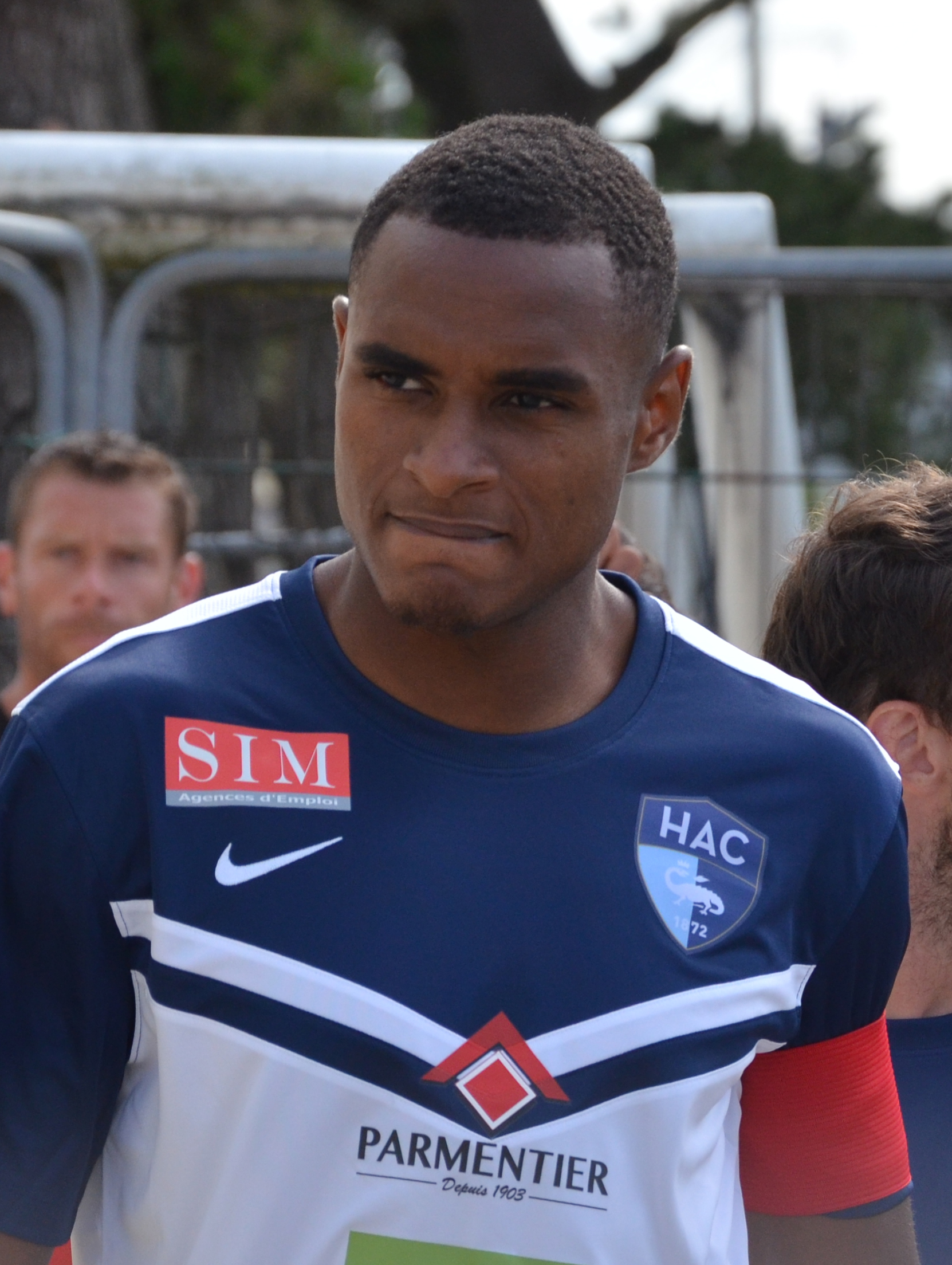
Fortes in 2015.

During the 2016–17 season he made 27 appearances for Le Havre, 25 in Ligue 2 and 2 in the Coupe de la Ligue.

In June 2017, Fortès joined Toulouse on a free transfer signing a four-year contract.

He was loaned to Lens in January 2019 until the end of the season. On 21 June 2019, the deal was made permanent with Fortes agreeing to a three-year contract. In August 2021 he moved on loan to Oostende. In summer 2022, after his return from loan, Fortès was linked with a move away from Lens.

On 11 August 2023, Fortès signed a one-season contract with Quevilly-Rouen in Ligue 2.

== International career ==
Fortès made his senior international debut for Cape Verde in 2015. He was named in the squad for the 2021 Africa Cup of Nations.
