= 2026 Coupe de France final =

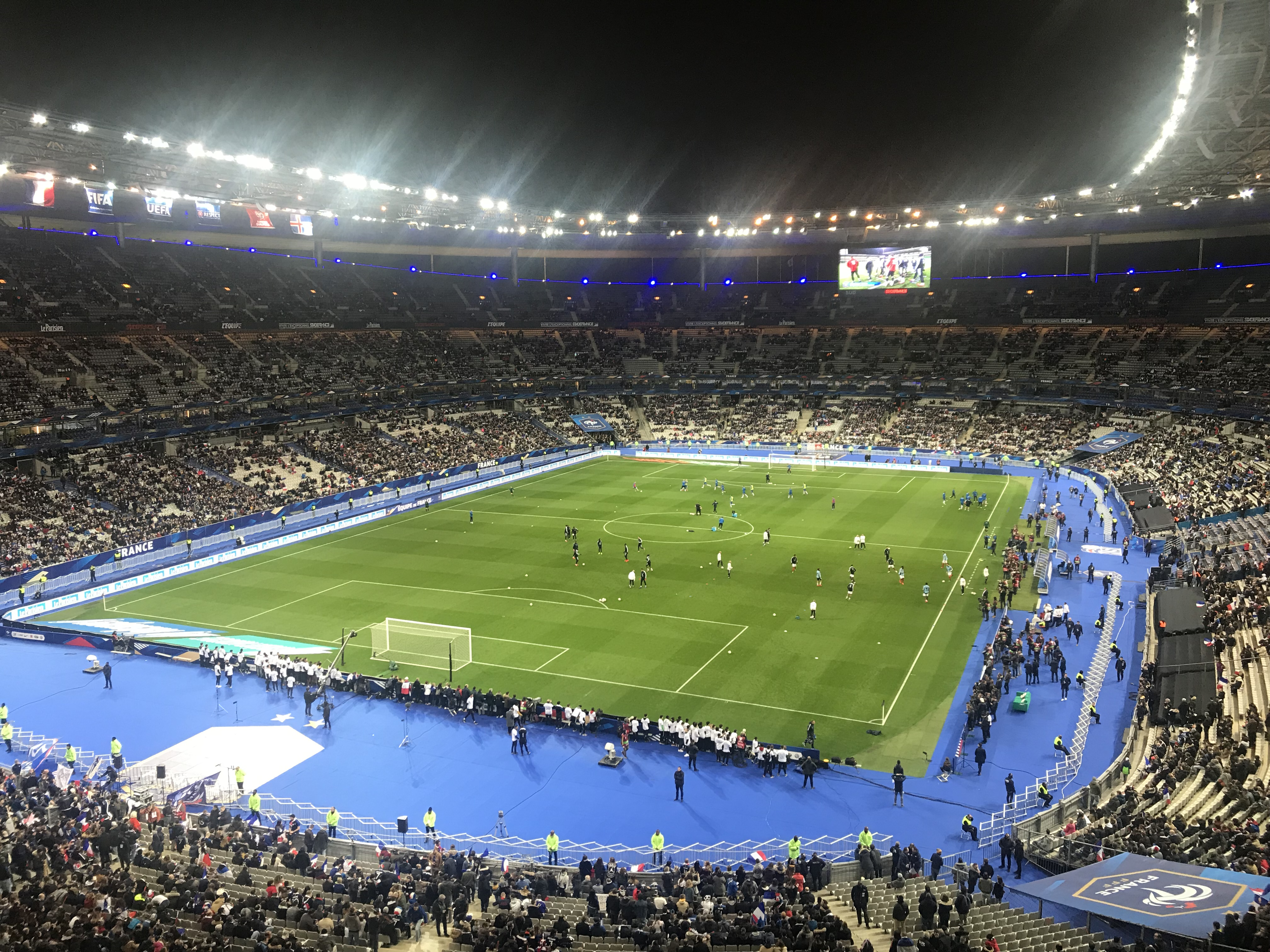
- The Stade de France hosted the final.
- Event: 2025–26 Coupe de France
| Lens | Nice |
| Ligue 1 | Ligue 1 |
| 3 | 1 |
- Date: 22 May 2026
- Venue: Stade de France, Saint-Denis
- Referee: Jérôme Brisard
- Attendance: 24,672

The 2026 Coupe de France final was a football match between Lens and Nice to decide the winner of the 2025–26 Coupe de France, the 109th season of the Coupe de France.

Lens won their first title after reaching three previous finals, last appearing in 1998. Nice had last reached the final in 2022, and last won the tournament in 1997.

== Route to the final ==
| Lens | | Round | Nice |
|---|---|---|---|---|
| Opponent | Result | 2025–26 Coupe de France | Opponent | Result |
| Feignies | 3–1 (H) | Round of 64 | Saint-Étienne | 2–1 (H) |
| Sochaux | 3–0 (A) | Round of 32 | Nantes | 1–1 (5–3 pen.) (A) |
| Troyes | 4–2 (A) | Round of 16 | Montpellier | 3–2 (H) |
| Lyon | 2–2 (5–4 pen.) (A) | Quarter-finals | Lorient | 0–0 (6–5 pen.) (A) |
| Toulouse | 4–1 (H) | Semi-finals | Strasbourg | 2–0 (A) |

Note: H = home fixture, A = away fixture

== Match ==
=== Details ===
22 May 2026
21:00 CEST

| Lens | 3–1 | Nice |
|---|---|---|
| Thauvin 25'; Édouard 42'; Sima 78' | Report | Coulibaly 45+3' |

Stade de France, Saint-Denis
Attendance: 24,672
Referee: Jérôme Brisard

| Lens | Nice |

| GK | 40 | (France) Robin Risser |
| CB | 32 | (France) Kyllian Antonio |
| CB | 25 | (Burkina Faso) Ismaëlo Ganiou |
| CB | 20 | (France) Malang Sarr |
| RM | 23 | (Saudi Arabia) Saud Abdulhamid | (yellow card) 36' |
| CM | 28 | (France) Adrien Thomasson (c) |
| CM | 8 | (Mali) Mamadou Sangaré |
| LM | 14 | (France) Matthieu Udol | (yellow card) 90+3' |
| RF | 10 | (France) Florian Thauvin | | (substituted off) 77' |
| CF | 11 | (France) Odsonne Édouard | | (substituted off) 65' |
| LF | 9 | (France) Allan Saint-Maximin | | (substituted off) 64' |
Substitutes:
| GK | 16 | (France) Mathieu Gorgelin |
| DF | 2 | (France) Ruben Aguilar |
| DF | 4 | (Bosnia and Herzegovina) Nidal Čelik |
| DF | 5 | (Montenegro) Andrija Bulatović |
| DF | 27 | (Democratic Republic of the Congo) Arthur Masuaku |
| MF | 21 | (Mali) Amadou Haidara |
| FW | 7 | (France) Florian Sotoca | | (substituted on) 77' |
| FW | 19 | (Senegal) Abdallah Sima | | (substituted on) 65' |
| FW | 22 | (France) Wesley Saïd | | (substituted on) 64' |
| FW | 38 | (Ivory Coast) Rayan Fofana |
Manager:
(France) Pierre Sage

| GK | 31 | (France) Maxime Dupé |
| CB | 33 | (Senegal) Antoine Mendy |
| CB | 4 | (Brazil) Dante | | (substituted off) 79' |
| CB | 37 | (Ghana) Kojo Peprah Oppong | (yellow card) 85' |
| RWB | 92 | (France) Jonathan Clauss (c) |
| LWB | 26 | (France) Melvin Bard | | (substituted off) 79' |
| RM | 6 | (Algeria) Hicham Boudaoui |
| CM | 39 | (France) Djibril Coulibaly | | (substituted off) 67' |
| LM | 10 | (Morocco) Sofiane Diop | | (substituted off) 67' |
| CF | 11 | (Ivory Coast) Elye Wahi |
| CF | 25 | (France) Mohamed-Ali Cho | | (substituted off) 66' |
Substitutes:
| GK | 30 | (Poland) Bartosz Żelazowski |
| GK | 80 | (Senegal) Yehvann Diouf |
| DF | 2 | (Tunisia) Ali Abdi | | (substituted on) 67' |
| DF | 28 | (Sierra Leone) Juma Bah |
| DF | 55 | (Burundi) Youssouf Ndayishimiye |
| MF | 8 | (France) Morgan Sanson | (yellow card) 90+2' | (substituted on) 67' |
| MF | 20 | (France) Tom Louchet | | (substituted on) 79' |
| MF | 24 | (Belgium) Charles Vanhoutte |
| MF | 32 | (France) Kaïl Boudache | | (substituted on) 66' |
| FW | 21 | (Sweden) Isak Jansson |
| FW | 47 | (Portugal) Tiago Gouveia |
| FW | 90 | (Spain) Kevin Carlos | | (substituted on) 79' |
Manager:
(France) Claude Puel

Assistant referees:
Alexis Auger
Thomas Luczynski
Fourth official:
Bastien Dechepy
Video assistant referee:
Alexandre Castro
Assistant video assistant referee:
Guillaume Paradis
Reserve assistant referee:
Nicolas Durand

Match rules

- 90 minutes
- 30 minutes of extra time if necessary
- Penalty shoot-out if scores still level
- Twelve named substitutes
- Maximum of five substitutions, with a sixth allowed in extra time (Note: Each team was given only three opportunities to make substitutions, with a fourth opportunity in extra time, excluding substitutions made at half-time, before the start of extra time and at half-time in extra time.)
