= 2025–26 RC Lens season =

RC Lens
2025–26 season
- Owner: Solferino SARL; Amber Capital
- President: Joseph Oughourlian
- Head coach: Pierre Sage
- Stadium: Stade Bollaert-Delelis
- Ligue 1: 2nd
- Coupe de France: Winners
- Top goalscorer: League: Odsonne Édouard; Wesley Saïd (12 each); All: Odsonne Édouard; Florian Thauvin (14 each)
- Average home league attendance: 37,564
Home colours	Away colours	Third colours

The 2025–26 season was the 119th season in the history of RC Lens, and the club's sixth consecutive season in Ligue 1. In addition to the domestic league, the club participated in the Coupe de France.

On 22 May 2026, the club won the Coupe de France for the first time in their history with a 3–1 win over Nice in the final.

== Players ==
=== First-team squad ===
As of 20 February 2026

Note: Flags indicate national team as defined under FIFA eligibility rules; some limited exceptions apply. Players may hold more than one non-FIFA nationality.

No.	Pos.	Nation	Player
1	GK	FRA	Régis Gurtner
2	DF	FRA	Ruben Aguilar
4	DF	BIH	Nidal Čelik
5	MF	MNE	Andrija Bulatović
6	DF	AUT	Samson Baidoo
7	FW	FRA	Florian Sotoca (captain)
8	MF	MLI	Mamadou Sangaré
9	FW	FRA	Allan Saint-Maximin
10	FW	FRA	Florian Thauvin
11	FW	FRA	Odsonne Édouard
14	DF	FRA	Matthieu Udol
16	GK	FRA	Mathieu Gorgelin
18	MF	FRA	Fodé Sylla
19	FW	SEN	Abdallah Sima
20	DF	FRA	Malang Sarr

No.	Pos.	Nation	Player
21	MF	MLI	Amadou Haidara
22	FW	FRA	Wesley Saïd
23	DF	KSA	Saud Abdulhamid (on loan from Roma)
24	DF	FRA	Jonathan Gradit
25	DF	BFA	Ismaëlo Ganiou
26	MF	FRA	Anthony Bermont
27	DF	COD	Arthur Masuaku (on loan from Sunderland)
28	MF	FRA	Adrien Thomasson
31	MF	FRA	Alpha Diallo
32	DF	FRA	Kyllian Antonio
34	FW	THA	Erawan Garnier
38	FW	FRA	Rayan Fofana
40	GK	FRA	Robin Risser
60	GK	FRA	Ilan Jourdren

=== Out on loan ===
Note: Flags indicate national team as defined under FIFA eligibility rules; some limited exceptions apply. Players may hold more than one non-FIFA nationality.

No.	Pos.	Nation	Player
—	GK	ITA	Mattia Fortin (at Padova until 30 June 2026)
—	GK	COM	Yannick Pandor (at Francs Borains until 30 June 2026)
—	GK	BFA	Hervé Koffi (at Angers until 30 June 2026)
—	DF	ECU	Jhoanner Chávez (at Sparta Prague until 30 June 2026)
—	DF	ARG	Facundo Medina (at Marseille until 30 June 2026)
—	DF	MLI	Souleymane Sagnan (at Caen until 30 June 2026)
—	MF	NCL	Angelo Fulgini (at Al-Taawoun until 30 June 2026)

No.	Pos.	Nation	Player
—	MF	MAR	Anass Zaroury (at Panathinaikos until 30 June 2026)
—	FW	SWE	Jeremy Agbonifo (at BK Häcken until 30 June 2026)
—	FW	FRA	Gabin Capuano (at Boulogne until 30 June 2026)
—	FW	CAF	Goduine Koyalipou (at Angers until 30 June 2026)
—	FW	GLP	Rémy Labeau Lascary (at Brest until 30 June 2026)
—	FW	FRA	Kembo Diliwidi (at Quevilly-Rouen until 30 June 2026)

== Management team ==
Position	Name
Sports Director	(France) Jean-Louis Leca
Head Coach	(France) Pierre Sage
Assistant Head Coach	(France) Éric Sikora
First-team Coach	(Morocco) Jamal Alioui (Algeria) Bilal Hamdi
Goalkeeping Coach	(France) Cédric Berthelin
Fitness Coach	(France) Vincent Lannoy
Club Doctor	(France) Dr. Eric Furmaniak
Physiotherapist	(France) Philippe Darques
Scout	(Tunisia) Alaeddine Yahia
Performance Manager	(France) Guillaume Ravé

== Transfers and contracts ==
=== In ===
Date	Pos.	Player	From	Fee	Ref.
4 July 2025	GK	(France) Robin Risser	(France) Strasbourg	€3,000,000	
15 July 2025	LB	(France) Matthieu Udol	(France) Metz	€3,500,000	
8 August 2025	CAM	(France) Florian Thauvin	(Italy) Udinese	€6,000,000	
20 August 2025	CM	(Mali) Mamadou Sangaré	(Austria) Rapid Wien	€8,000,000	
1 September 2025	FW	(France) Odsonne Édouard	(England) Crystal Palace	€3,700,000	
24 October 2025	FW	(Thailand) Erawan Garnier	(France) Lyon	Free	
2 February 2026	FW	(France) Allan Saint-Maximin	(Mexico) América	Free	

=== Out ===
Date	Pos.	Player	To	Fee	Ref.
8 December 2025	DF	(Colombia) Deiver Machado	(France) Nantes	€300,000	

=== Loaned in ===
Date	Pos.	Player	From	Fee	Ref.
3 August 2025	RB	(Saudi Arabia) Saud Abdulhamid	(Italy) Roma	Undisclosed	
24 January 2026	LB	(Democratic Republic of the Congo) Arthur Masuaku	(England) Sunderland	Undisclosed	

=== Loaned out ===
Date	Pos.	Player	To	Fee	Ref.
2 July 2025	CB	(Argentina) Facundo Medina	(France) Marseille	€2,000,000	
1 September 2025	FW	(Uruguay) Martín Satriano	(France) Lyon	€1,000,000	

== Competitions ==
=== Overall record ===
Competition	First match	Last match	Starting round	Final position	Record							
Competition	First match	Last match	Starting round	Final position	Pld	W	D	L	GF	GA	GD	Win %
Ligue 1	16 August 2025	17 May 2026	Matchday 1	2nd	34	22	4	8	66	35	+31	64.71
Coupe de France	19 December 2025	22 May 2026	Round of 64	Winners	6	5	1	0	19	7	+12	83.33
Total					40	27	5	8	85	42	+43	67.50

Source: Soccerway

=== Ligue 1 ===
==== League table ====
Pos	Team	Pld	W	D	L	GF	GA	GD	Pts	Qualification or relegation
1	Paris Saint-Germain (C)	34	24	4	6	74	29	+45	76	Qualification for the Champions League league phase
2	Lens	34	22	4	8	66	35	+31	70	Qualification for the Champions League league phase
3	Lille	34	18	7	9	52	37	+15	61	Qualification for the Champions League league phase
4	Lyon	34	18	6	10	53	40	+13	60	Qualification for the Champions League third qualifying round
5	Marseille	34	18	5	11	63	45	+18	59	Qualification for the Europa League league phase (Note: Since the 2025–26 Coupe de France winners, Lens, qualified for the Champions League via league position, the Europa League spot awarded to the cup winners was passed to the sixth-placed team, and the Conference League spot was passed to the seventh-placed team.)

Source: Ligue 1
Rules for classification: 1) Points; 2) Goal difference; 3) Head-to-head points; 4) Head-to-head goal difference; 5) Head-to-head goals scored; 6) Head-to-head away goals scored; 7) Goals scored; 8) Away goals scored; 9) Fair-play points (Note: Head-to-head record is used only after all the matches between the teams in question have been played).
(C) Champions

==== Results summary ====
Overall								Home						Away					
Pld	W	D	L	GF	GA	GD	Pts	W	D	L	GF	GA	GD	W	D	L	GF	GA	GD
34	22	4	8	66	35	+31	70	14	0	3	35	13	+22	8	4	5	31	22	+9

Source: Ligue 1

==== Results by round ====
Round	1	2	3	4	5	6	7	8	9	10	11	12	13	14	15	16	17	18	19	20	21	22	23	24	25	26	27	28	30	31	32	33	29^{1}	34
Ground	H	A	H	A	H	A	A	H	H	A	H	A	H	A	A	H	A	H	A	H	H	A	H	A	H	A	H	A	H	A	A	H	H	A
Result	L	W	W	L	W	D	W	W	W	L	W	W	W	W	W	W	W	W	L	W	W	W	L	D	W	L	W	L	W	D	D	W	L	W
Position	17	10	5	9	7	7	6	4	2	6	3	3	3	1	1	1	1	1	2	2	2	1	2	2	2	2	2	2	2	2	2	2	2	2

Source: Ligue 1
A = Away; H = Home; W = Win; D = Draw; L = Loss

^{1} Matchday 29 (vs Paris Saint-Germain) was postponed due to Paris Saint-Germain's involvement in the UEFA Champions League.

==== Matches ====
16 August 2025 1	Lens	0–1	Lyon	Lens
17:00 CEST (UTC+2)	Baidoo (yellow card) 34'; Sarr (yellow card) 42'	Report	Mikautadze 45+1'; Kumbedi (yellow card) 56'; Abner (yellow card) 61'; Karabec (yellow card) 90+5'	Stadium: Stade Bollaert-Delelis; Attendance: 38,137; Referee: Romain Lissorgue

24 August 2025 2	Le Havre	1–2	Lens	Le Havre
17:15 CEST (UTC+2)		Report		Stadium: Stade Océane; Attendance: 19,375; Referee: Guillaume Paradis

29 August 2025 3	Lens	3–1	Brest	Lens
20:45 CEST (UTC+2)		Report		Stadium: Stade Bollaert-Delelis; Attendance: 37,232; Referee: Abdelatif Kherradji

14 September 2025 4	Paris Saint-Germain	2–0	Lens	Paris
17:15 CEST (UTC+2)	Barcola 15', 51'; Ramos (yellow card) 39'	Report	Édouard (yellow card) 5'; Thauvin (yellow card) 18'	Stadium: Parc des Princes; Attendance: 47,642; Referee: Jérémie Pignard

20 September 2025 5	Lens	3–0	Lille	Lens
21:05 CEST (UTC+2)	Saïd 28'; Thauvin 43'; Fofana 52'; Udol (yellow card) 83'	Report	Verdonk (yellow card) 36'; Mandi (yellow card) 45+1'; Mbemba (yellow card) 90+5'	Stadium: Stade Bollaert-Delelis; Attendance: 38,223; Referee: Eric Wattellier

28 September 2025 6	Rennes	0–0	Lens	Rennes
20:45 CEST (UTC+2)	Camara (yellow card) 63'; Nagida (yellow card) 85'; Jacquet (yellow card) 90+2'	Report	Gradit (red card) 1'; Thomasson (yellow card) 40'; Guilavogui (yellow card) 90+3'; Sotoca (yellow card) 90+3'	Stadium: Roazhon Park; Attendance: 26,414; Referee: Bastien Dechepy

4 October 2025 7	Auxerre	1–2	Lens	Auxerre
21:05 CEST (UTC+2)	Sierralta 61'; Namaso (yellow card) 62'; Mensah (yellow card) 65'; Owusu (yellow card) 68'	Report	Édouard 14'; Baidoo (yellow card) 15'; Ganiou (yellow card) 46' (yellow-red card) 73'; Risser (yellow card) 62'; Thauvin (yellow card) 66'; Thomasson (yellow card) 87'; Sarr (yellow card) 90+2'; Sima 90+6'	Stadium: Stade de l'Abbé-Deschamps; Attendance: 17,243; Referee: François Letexier

19 October 2025 8	Lens	2–1	Paris FC	Lens
15:00 CEST (UTC+2)	Édouard 25'; Thauvin (yellow card) 46'; Baidoo 64'; Sima (yellow card) 90'	Report	Kebbal (yellow card) 8'; Lees-Melou 27'; Traoré (yellow card) 55'	Stadium: Stade Bollaert-Delelis; Attendance: 33,773; Referee: Gaël Angoula

25 October 2025 9	Lens	2–1	Marseille	Lens
21:05 CEST (UTC+2)	Édouard 23' (pen.); Thomasson (yellow card) 34'; Pavard 53' (o.g.); Guilavogui (yellow card) 84'; Sangaré (yellow card) 88'	Report	Greenwood 17', (yellow card) 86'; Pavard (yellow card) 22'; Balerdi (yellow card) 87'	Stadium: Stade Bollaert-Delelis; Attendance: 38,223; Referee: Stéphanie Frappart

29 October 2025 10	Metz	2–0	Lens	Longeville-lès-Metz
20:00 CEST (UTC+2)		Report		Stadium: Stade Saint-Symphorien; Attendance: 20,618; Referee: Abdelatif Kherradji

2 November 2025 11	Lens	3–0	Lorient	Lens
17:15 CET (UTC+1)		Report		Stadium: Stade Bollaert-Delelis; Attendance: 37,373; Referee: Jérémie Pignard

8 November 2025 12	Monaco	1–4	Lens	Monaco
21:05 CET (UTC+1)	Balogun 37' (pen.), (red card) 45'; Fati (penalty missed) 90+3'; Zakaria (yellow card) 90+5'	Report	Édouard 21'; Saïd 40', 60'; Sangaré 45+3'; Gradit (yellow card) 57'; Aguilar (yellow card) 74'	Stadium: Stade Louis II; Attendance: 9,456; Referee: Bastien Dechepy

22 November 2025 13	Lens	1–0	Strasbourg	Lens
17:00 CET (UTC+1)	Ganiou 69'; Thomasson (yellow card) 77'; Guilavogui (red card) 90+5'; Sotoca (yellow card) 90+6'	Report	El Mourabet (yellow card) 2'; Doué (yellow card) 68'; Barco (red card) 77'; Emegha (yellow card) 90+7'	Stadium: Stade Bollaert-Delelis; Attendance: 38,211; Referee: Jérôme Brisard

30 November 2025 14	Angers	1–2	Lens	Angers
17:15 CET (UTC+1)		Report		Stadium: Stade Raymond Kopa; Attendance: 12,979; Referee: Guillaume Paradis

6 December 2025 15	Nantes	1–2	Lens	Nantes
17:00 CET (UTC+1)		Report		Stadium: Stade de la Beaujoire; Attendance: 26,654; Referee: Benoît Bastien

14 December 2025 16	Lens	2–0	Nice	Lens
17:15 CET (UTC+1)	Édouard 15', 57'	Report	Vanhoutte (yellow card) 10'; Abdul Samed (yellow card) 83'	Stadium: Stade Bollaert-Delelis; Attendance: 37,278; Referee: Willy Delajod

2 January 2026 17	Toulouse	0–3	Lens	Toulouse
20:45 CET (UTC+1)	Emersonn (red card) 23'; Cresswell (yellow card) 57'; Sauer (yellow card) 87'	Report	Thauvin (yellow card) 50'; Saïd 57'; Thomasson 85'; Bulatović (yellow card) 88'; Risser (yellow card) 90+2'; Ganiou 90+5'	Stadium: Stadium de Toulouse; Attendance: 30,266; Referee: Mathieu Vernice

17 January 2026 18	Lens	1–0	Auxerre	Lens
17:00 CET (UTC+1)	Thomasson (yellow card) 14'; Saïd 65'; Guilavogui (yellow card) 80'	Report	Diomandé (yellow card) 24'; Danois (yellow card) 27'; Akpa (yellow card) 51'; Senaya (yellow card) 60'; Dioussé (yellow card) 90+5'	Stadium: Stade Bollaert-Delelis; Attendance: 38,083; Referee: Bastien Dechepy

24 January 2026 19	Marseille	3–1	Lens	Marseille
21:05 CET (UTC+1)	Gouiri 3', 75'; Nwaneri 13'	Report	Saïd (yellow card) 37'; Sangaré (yellow card) 61'; Thauvin (yellow card) 70'; Fofana 85'	Stadium: Stade Vélodrome; Attendance: 52,673; Referee: Benoît Bastien

30 January 2026 20	Lens	1–0	Le Havre	Lens
20:45 CET (UTC+1)	Aguilar 45+1'; Antonio (yellow card) 90+9'	Report	Boufal (yellow card) 49'; Gourna-Douath (yellow card) 78'	Stadium: Stade Bollaert-Delelis; Attendance: 38,158; Referee: Jérémy Stinat

7 February 2026 21	Lens	3–1	Rennes	Lens
17:00 CET (UTC+1)	Aguilar 54', (yellow card) 32' (yellow-red card) 56'; Thomasson (yellow card) 36'; Édouard 41'; Sangaré (yellow card) 45+2'; Saint-Maximin 78'	Report	Lepaul 8'; Embolo (yellow card) 45'; Nordin (yellow card) 61'	Stadium: Stade Bollaert-Delelis; Attendance: 38,174; Referee: Jérémie Pignard

14 February 2026 22	Paris FC	0–5	Lens	Paris
21:05 CET (UTC+1)	Lees-Melou (yellow card) 83'; Matondo (yellow card) 84'	Report	Saïd 24', 38', (yellow card) 45+4'; Thauvin 58' (pen.); Fofana 90', 90+5'	Stadium: Stade Jean-Bouin; Attendance: 17,536; Referee: Bastien Dechepy

21 February 2026 23	Lens	2–3	Monaco	Lens
17:00 CET (UTC+1)	Édouard 3'; Thauvin 56'; Abdulhamid (yellow card) 74'; Ganiou (yellow card) 90+4'	Report	Balogun 62'; Zakaria 70'; Fati 72'; Faes (yellow card) 90+2'; Teze (yellow card) 90+6'	Stadium: Stade Bollaert-Delelis; Attendance: 37,727; Referee: Willy Delajod

27 February 2026 24	Strasbourg	1–1	Lens	Strasbourg
20:45 CET (UTC+1)	Ouattara (yellow card) 4'; Panichelli 18'; Enciso (yellow card) 79'	Report	Thomasson (yellow card) 45+1'; Sangaré 62'; Udol (yellow card) 87'	Stadium: Stade de la Meinau; Attendance: 29,000; Referee: Clément Turpin

8 March 2026 25	Lens	3–0	Metz	Lens
16:00 CET (UTC+1)	Abdulhamid 44'; Thauvin 46'; Haidara 52'	Report	Gbamin (yellow card) 14'; Touré (yellow card) 49'; Mboula (yellow card) 90'	Stadium: Stade Bollaert-Delelis; Attendance: Mathieu Vernice; Referee: 37,381

14 March 2026 26	Lorient	2–1	Lens	Lorient
18:00 CET (UTC+1)	Dieng 18'; Faye (yellow card) 26'; Talbi (yellow card) 54'; Tosin 65'	Report	Čelik (yellow card) 23'; Édouard 48'; Ganiou (yellow card) 71'; Abdulhamid (yellow card) 75'	Stadium: Stade du Moustoir; Attendance: 15,942; Referee: Thomas Leonard

20 March 2026 27	Lens	5–1	Angers	Lens
21:45 CET (UTC+1)	Thauvin 13'; Édouard 25', 48'; Sangaré 39'; Udol 72'	Report	Machine 62'	Stadium: Stade Bollaert-Delelis; Attendance: 37,303; Referee: Stéphanie Frappart

4 April 2026 28	Lille	3–0	Lens	Villeneuve-d'Ascq
21:05 CEST (UTC+2)	Haraldsson 44'; Ngoy (yellow card) 45+5'; Correia 49'; Fernandez-Pardo 58' (pen.); Özer (yellow card) 72'; Mbappé (yellow card) 89'	Report	Thomasson (yellow card) 45+5'; Abdulhamid (yellow card) 78'	Stadium: Stade Pierre-Mauroy; Attendance: 48,491; Referee: François Letexier

17 April 2026 30	Lens	3–2	Toulouse	Lens
20:45 CEST (UTC+2)	Masuaku (yellow card) 45'; Abdulhamid 61'; Thomasson 67'; Ganiou 90+1'	Report	Cásseres 6'; Koumbassa 13'; Gboho (red card) 17'; Sauer (yellow card) 88'	Stadium: Stade Bollaert-Delelis; Attendance: 37,351; Referee: Jérémie Pignard

24 April 2026 31	Brest	3–3	Lens	Brest
20:45 CET (UTC+1)	Guindo 7'; Tousart 24'; Ebimbe 42', (yellow card) 75'; Lala (yellow card) 90+4'; Coudert (yellow card) 90+6'	Report	Thomasson (yellow card) 55'; Thauvin 60'; Sima 64'; Sangaré (yellow card) 85'; Saint-Maximin 90+4'; Édouard (yellow card) 90+6'	Stadium: Stade Francis-Le Blé; Attendance: 14,550; Referee: Stéphanie Frappart

2 May 2026 32	Nice	1–1	Lens	Nice
21:05 CEST (UTC+2)		Report		Stadium: Allianz Riviera

8 May 2026 33	Lens	1–0	Nantes	Lens
20:45 CEST (UTC+2)		Report		Stadium: Stade Bollaert-Delelis

13 May 2026 29	Lens	0–2	Paris Saint-Germain	Lens
21:00 CEST (UTC+2)		Report	Kvaratskhelia 29'; Zabarnyi (yellow card) 45'; Mbaye 90+3'	Stadium: Stade Bollaert-Delelis; Attendance: 38,139; Referee: Benoît Bastien
Note: The match was originally scheduled for 11 April 2026, but was postponed due to Paris Saint-Germain's involvement in the UEFA Champions League.

17 May 2026 34	Lyon	0–4	Lens	Décines-Charpieu
21:00 CEST (UTC+2)	Šulc (yellow card) 63'	Report	Sarr (yellow card) 5'; Saïd 20', 32'; Abdulhamid (yellow card) 27'; Sotoca 45+1'; Thauvin 53'; Aguilar (yellow card) 73'; Čelik (yellow card) 83'	Stadium: Parc Olympique Lyonnais; Attendance: 58,227; Referee: François Letexier

=== Coupe de France ===
19 December 2025 Round of 64	Lens	3–1	SC Feignies	Lens
21:00 CET (UTC+1)	Fofana 17'; Abdulhamid 45+1'; Bermont (yellow card) 65'; Bulatović 68'	Report	Chah (yellow card) 67'; Wackers (yellow card) 67'; Bonte 85'	Stadium: Stade Bollaert-Delelis; Attendance: 37,217; Referee: Guillaume Paradis

11 January 2026 Round of 32	Sochaux	0–3	Lens	Montbéliard
14:00 CET (UTC+1)		Report	Édouard 22'; Udol 87'; Sima 89'	Stadium: Stade Auguste Bonal; Attendance: 19,210; Referee: Romain Lissorgue

4 February 2026 Round of 16	Troyes	2–4	Lens	Troyes
21:00 CET (UTC+1)	Gambor (yellow card) 17'; Diop (yellow card) 25'; Adeline 45+4'; Ripart 63', (yellow card) 71'; Monfray (yellow card) 70'	Report	Sotoca 41'; Sima 50', 58'; Bulatović 52'; Saïd (yellow card) 66'; Saint-Maximin (yellow card) 79'; Risser (yellow card) 86'	Stadium: Stade de l'Aube; Attendance: 15,362; Referee: Gaël Angoula

5 March 2026 Quarter-finals	Lyon	2–2 (4–5 p)	Lens	Décines-Charpieu
21:10 CET (UTC+1)	Tagliafico (yellow card) 45+3'; Yaremchuk 67'; Himbert 90+4'	Report	Thauvin 23'; Sima 45+1'; Édouard (yellow card) 45+3'; Udol (yellow card) 54'; Masuaku (red card) 64'; Čelik (yellow card) 78'	Stadium: Parc Olympique Lyonnais; Attendance: 47,879; Referee: Benoît Bastien
	Penalties
	Karabec (penalty scored); Tolisso (penalty scored); Morton (penalty scored); Niakhaté (penalty missed); Endrick (penalty scored)		(penalty scored) Fofana; (penalty scored) Abdulhamid; (penalty scored) Udol; (penalty scored) Sangaré; (penalty scored) Thauvin

21 April 2026 Semi-finals	Lens	4–1	Toulouse	Lens
21:10 CEST (UTC+2)	Thauvin 9' (pen.); Saint-Maximin 18'; Udol 35'; Thomasson 74'	Report	Hidalgo 21'	Stadium: Stade Bollaert-Delelis; Referee: Willy Delajod

22 May 2026 Final	Lens	3–1	Nice	Saint-Denis
21:00 CEST (UTC+2)	Thauvin 25'; Édouard 42'; Sima 78'	Report	Coulibaly 45+3'	Stadium: Stade de France; Attendance: 24,672; Referee: Jérôme Brisard
