= Allan Saint-Maximin =

French footballer (born 1997)

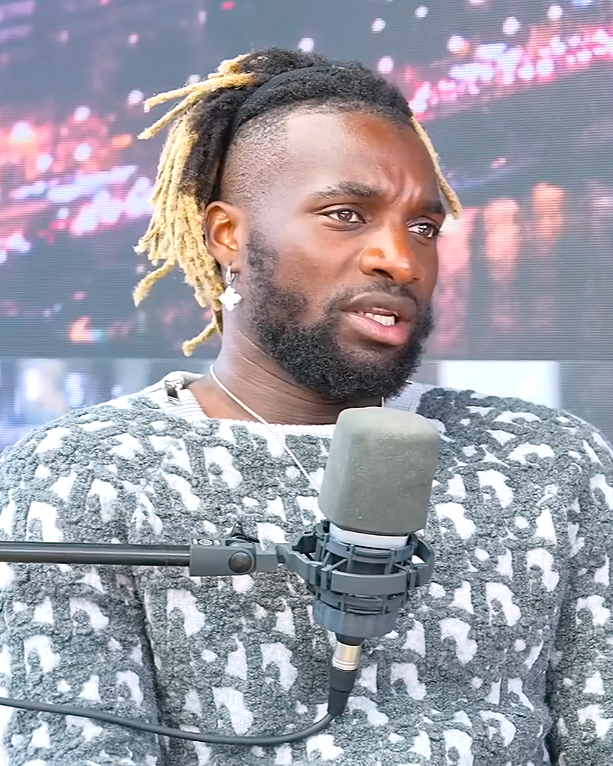
- Saint-Maximin in 2025

Personal information
- Full name: Allan Irénée Saint-Maximin
- Date of birth: 12 March 1997 (age 29)
- Place of birth: Châtenay-Malabry, Hauts-de-Seine, France
- Height: 1.73 m (5 ft 8 in)
- Position: Winger

Team information
- Current team: Charlotte FC
- Number: 10

Youth career
- 2003–2004: Verrières-le-Buisson
- 2004–2007: US Ris-Orangis
- 2007–2011: Boulogne-Billancourt
- 2011–2013: Saint-Étienne

Senior career*
Years	Team	Apps	(Gls)
2013–2015	Saint-Étienne II	22	(7)
2013–2015	Saint-Étienne	12	(0)
2015–2017	Monaco	1	(0)
2015–2016	→ Hannover 96 (loan)	16	(1)
2016–2017	→ Bastia (loan)	34	(3)
2017–2019	Nice	64	(9)
2019–2023	Newcastle United	111	(12)
2023–2025	Al-Ahli	30	(4)
2024–2025	→ Fenerbahçe (loan)	20	(4)
2025–2026	América	16	(3)
2026	Lens	10	(3)
2026–	Charlotte FC	14	(2)

International career
2013	France U16	11	(3)
2013–2014	France U17	7	(4)
2016–2017	France U20	7	(2)
2017–2019	France U21	7	(0)
- * Club domestic league appearances and goals as of 19:47, 15 November 2026 (UTC)

Allan Irénée Saint-Maximin (born 12 March 1997) is a French professional footballer who plays as a winger for Major League Soccer club Charlotte FC.

Saint-Maximin began his professional career at Saint-Étienne as a teenager before joining Monaco, where he gained experience through loan spells at German side Hannover 96 and French club Bastia. After a brief stint at Nice, Saint-Maximin made his mark in the Premier League with Newcastle United. He later moved to Saudi Arabian club Al-Ahli before having a loan spell at Turkish side Fenerbahçe. Most recently, he had a short spell with Mexican club América before joining French club Lens.

== Early life ==
Saint-Maximin was born on 12 March 1997 in Châtenay-Malabry, Hauts-de-Seine, a commune in the southwestern suburbs of Paris. The youngest of three children, his father, Alex, hailed from the Caribbean island of Guadeloupe and his mother, Nadège, was born in French Guiana in South America. At the time of his birth, his family resided in the town of Meudon where Saint-Maximin grew up playing football, mainly on the streets with his friends or on the pitch in Ris-Orangis whilst his parents worked; his father worked at Paris Diderot University and his mother stayed late as director of a school in Meudon. From an early age, Saint-Maximin learnt to speak English, as encouraged by his mother, in order to achieve his dream of playing in the Premier League.

Growing up in a comfortable Christian home, Saint-Maximin, in his early school years, was given €10 by his mother every day, which he used to buy sweets for his school friends who could not afford such luxury – a sign of his early generosity. He took a liking towards Karate Kid, tennis and manga, all of whom were significant influences on his trademark headband. In football, Saint-Maximin joined his first club, TU Verrieres-le-Buisson, where he briefly played for a few months before joining US Ris-Orangis with his older brother, Kurtys.

== Club career ==
=== Youth career ===
Under coach Didier Demonchy, Saint-Maximin trained with older kids despite being five years old during his time in Ris-Orangis. Demonchy recalled his talents, stating, "His talent was innate", adding, "Usually, five-year-olds make mistakes or fall over. Not Allan. He was doing everything right and nothing was random." Saint-Maximin would spend three years at the club before making a move to AC Boulogne-Billancourt, where he attracted attention from various scouts in France. He was noted for his early talent and precociousness leading him to sign for Saint-Étienne in 2011, after being picked up by a scout who saw him play at a U13 tournament in Meudon. Another offer came in with Paris club Paris Saint-Germain, which included a house for his parents and a big signing bonus of more than €100,000, but was later rejected by Saint-Maximin, who had already committed to Saint-Étienne. At the age of 14, Saint-Maximin left Paris and moved permanently to Saint-Etienne, where he was looked after by Paul and Nicole Cavallero.

=== Saint-Étienne ===
Impressing in the youth ranks, Saint-Maximin signed his first professional contract with Saint-Étienne on 1 July 2013. At the age of 16 years, 5 months, and 17 days, he made his club debut on 29 August as a substitute in a Europa League play-off match, coming on for Franck Tabanou before his side suffered a 1–0 loss to Esbjerg fB at Stade Geoffroy-Guichard. His debut made him the third youngest player for Saint-Étienne after Laurent Roussey (16 years and 2 months) and Laurent Paganelli (15 years, 10 months and 3 days). Three days later, Saint-Maximin made his Ligue 1 debut at home in a 2–1 win against Bordeaux, becoming one of the youngest players to debut in the league. In his first season with the club, he played 138 minutes in 5 games under Christophe Galtier.

On 7 February 2015, Saint-Maximin extended his contract to June 2019 with Saint-Étienne, having been promised more playing time. However, having managed only 16 league appearances, along with Championnat National appearances with the second team, Saint-Maximin sought to leave the club, feeling unwanted due to his limited opportunities with the first team. In an interview with France Football he discussed on his departure, stating, "I did everything to impose myself in Sainté with good matches against OM, Bordeaux and Lille. Afterwards, I alternated between the CFA and the stands. At first, I thought I was learning the trade, and then it became exhausting." Saint-Maximin made 11 appearances for the club, which included 9 Ligue 1 and 2 Europa League appearances during the 2014–15 season.

=== Monaco ===
==== 2015–16: Transfer to Monaco and loan to Hannover 96 ====
On 31 July 2015, Saint-Maximin joined Monaco, signing a five-year contract after completing a €5 million transfer fee. He was immediately loaned to German club Hannover 96 the same day, already present in his first training session with the club that morning. The next day, Saint-Maximin made his unofficial debut at HDI Arena in a 1–0 exhibition loss to Sunderland, a week prior to Hannover's DFB-Pokal fixture against Hessen Kassel, where he made his competitive debut. Following his club bow, Saint-Maximin was benched in the season opener against Darmstadt 98 on 15 August, making his league debut a week later, whilst utilised as an attacking midfielder, in a 1–0 home defeat to Bayer Leverkusen. He scored his first goal for the club on 5 December in a 3–1 defeat to Schalke at Arena AufSchalke. Eight days later, he earned his first start for Hannover in the league match against Hoffenheim where his side lost 1–0.

In January 2016, during the mid-season break, Saint-Maximin would miss 96's friendly matches in Belek, Turkey, to be with his pregnant wife who was expecting their first child. Saint-Maximin would register 16 league appearances with 1 goal during the season. However, an incident cut his loan short. In April, Saint-Maximin was involved in a car accident that collided with a tram, injuring 1 person then presented a fake driving license, leading to an investigation on suspicion of forgery, driving without a license and negligent bodily harm. As a result, he was dropped from the squad under Daniel Stendel, not making a single appearance until his return to France. By the end of the season, Hannover was relegated to the 2. Bundesliga after finishing bottom and ending their 14 years in the top flight of Germany.

==== 2016–17: Loan to Bastia and Monaco debut ====
On 28 July 2016, Saint-Maximin was sent on loan to Ligue 1 club Bastia for a season. He scored his first goal for the club in a 3–0 win over Lorient on 20 August. Saint-Maximin didn't score again until on 10 December, netting a brace in Bastia's 2–0 league victory against Metz, ending their 10 game winless streak. In January 2017, Saint-Maximin's number was changed from 6 to 10, following Lyes Houri loan exit to Roda. He proved to be one of the best attackers for Bastia, with 3 goals and 3 assists, despite his side finishing bottom of the league at the end of the season. He played in the final league game for the club on 20 May 2017, after being granted permission from the French Football Federation (FFF) before his call-up to the France U20 squad, in a 1–0 defeat to Marseille at Stade Vélodrome.

On his return to Monaco, Saint-Maximin showed promising form in preseason, scoring 1 goal and adding 2 assists in 4 matches for the club. However, a stacked attacking depth containing Kylian Mbappé, Rony Lopes and Thomas Lemar, meant he could expect scarce playing time. Despite this, he opened to the media, stating that he is "ready to play for Monaco from next season." Saint-Maximin made his debut for the club in the 2017 Trophée des Champions against Paris SG, replacing Mbappé in 77th-minute of a 2–1 loss at Ibn Batouta Stadium. He made his Ligue 1 debut on 4 August, once again, replacing Mbappé who had suffered a knee injury in the 75th-minute of a 3–2 home win over Toulouse. It would be his final appearance for the club before his departure three days later.

=== Nice ===
On 7 August 2017, Saint-Maximin completed a move, as a club-record signing, to Côte d'Azur rival Nice for a reported transfer fee of €10 million. A month later, on 14 September, he netted his first goal in a 5–1 away win over Zulte Waregem in the Europa League.

=== Newcastle United ===
On 2 August 2019, Saint-Maximin joined Premier League side Newcastle United on a six-year contract. He made his debut nine days later in Newcastle's defeat to Arsenal on the opening day of the Premier League season. On 5 December, Saint-Maximin scored his first goal for the club in a 2–0 win against Sheffield United. His second goal came two months later in the fourth round of the FA Cup against League One opposition Oxford United, scoring a late winner after a solo run.

The Frenchman also scored the winning goal in Newcastle's 1–0 win at Southampton in a Premier League match on 7 March 2020. On 1 July, Saint-Maximin provided three assists in the Magpies' 4–1 win over AFC Bournemouth.

=== Al Ahli ===
On 30 July 2023, Saint-Maximin signed a three-year contract for Saudi Professional League club Al Ahli for a transfer fee reported to be around £23 million. On 16 September, he scored his first goal at the club, by netting the winner in a 3–2 victory over Al Taawoun.

==== Loan to Fenerbahçe ====
On 16 July 2024, Maximin joined Turkish side Fenerbahçe on loan for the 2024–25 season. On 6 August 2024, he made his debut with the team against Lille OSC in a Champions League third qualifying round match.

On 10 August 2024, he made his Süper Lig debut against Adana Demirspor (won 1–0) and on 15 September 2024, he scored his first goal against Kasımpaşa SK and also made an assist in a 2–0 Süper Lig win.

=== Club América ===
On 12 August 2025, Mexican club América completed the signing of Maximin for a reported fee of US$12 million. He made his debut on 24 August, scoring in a 4–2 away win over Atlas. On 31 January 2026, Saint-Maximin abruptly left the club after a racist incident involving his children.

=== RC Lens ===
On 2 February 2026, Ligue 1 club Lens announced the club had signed the player on a 6-months contract to boost its offense, in hopes to rival Paris Saint-Germain for the league title. Less than a week later, on 7 February, he scored his first goal in a 3–1 win over Rennes. Despite contracting an ankle injury against Strasbourg three weeks later that complicated his integration with his new teammates and made him miss a few games, Saint-Maximin became a key player in Pierre Sage's system. He played 10 out of the 14 season games with Lens and started both the Coupe de France Semi-Final and Final games, clinching the trophy for the first time in the club's history. As agreed upon his arrival, he departed the club by the end of the 2025–26 season, despite offers from the club to keep him for the upcoming Champions League campaign.

=== Charlotte FC ===
On 13 July, 2026, Saint-Maximin joined Major League Soccer club Charlotte FC on a three-year contract through the 2028-29 MLS season.

== International career ==
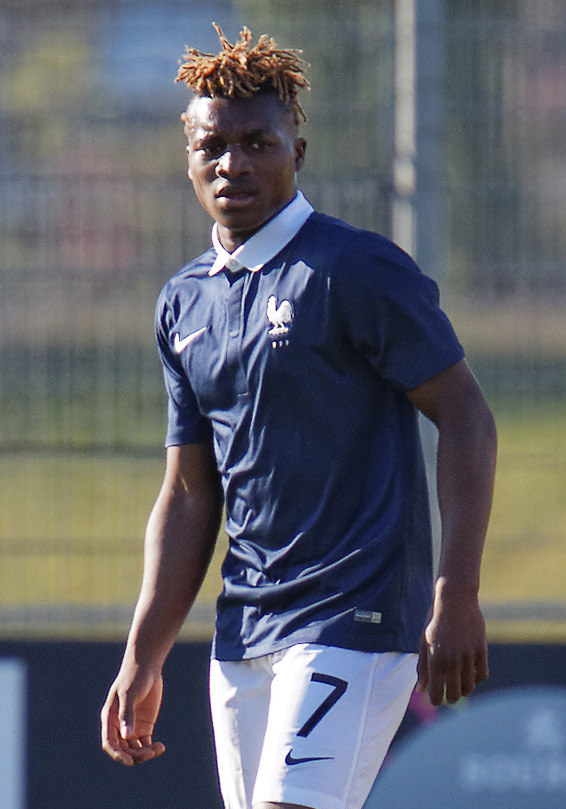
Saint-Maximin playing for France U17 in 2014

Saint-Maximin played for the U-16, U-17, U-20, and U-21 French national teams.

== Personal life ==
Saint-Maximin has four children.

He is close friends with Marcus Thuram, whom he befriended during his time at AC Boulogne-Billancourt.

Saint-Maximin has been speculated to have Haitian ancestry, and has been involved in rumors that he may join Haiti for the 2026 World Cup. However, he confirmed that these were not accurate, posting on Twitter in November 2025, "I want to congratulate the Haitian people and the national team for their historic qualification. It is an important moment, and I am sincerely happy for Haiti. I can see that some people have drawn a connection, surely because I am Guadeloupean and Guyanese, but to be clear, there is no process and no intention concerning the Haiti national team. I have total respect for the players who earned their place in the World Cup. They have fought for their qualification, and it is important for them not to be associated to these rumours. All the best to them for the World Cup."

== Career statistics ==
As of match played 31 October 2026

Appearances and goals by club, season and competition
Club	Season	League			National cup (Note: Includes Coupe de France, DFB-Pokal, FA Cup, King's Cup, Turkish Cup)		League cup (Note: Includes Coupe de la Ligue, EFL Cup)		Continental		Other		Total	
Club	Season	Division	Apps	Goals	Apps	Goals	Apps	Goals	Apps	Goals	Apps	Goals	Apps	Goals
Saint-Étienne II	2013–14	CFA 2	15	5	—		—		—		—		15	5
Saint-Étienne II	2014–15	CFA	7	2	—		—		—		—		7	2
Saint-Étienne II	Total		22	7	—		—		—		—		22	7
Saint-Étienne	2013–14	Ligue 1	3	0	1	0	0	0	1 (Note: Appearances in UEFA Europa League)	0	—		5	0
Saint-Étienne	2014–15	Ligue 1	9	0	2	0	0	0	1	0	—		12	0
Saint-Étienne	Total		12	0	3	0	0	0	2	0	—		17	0
Hannover 96 (loan)	2015–16	Bundesliga	16	1	2	0	—		—		—		18	1
Bastia (loan)	2016–17	Ligue 1	34	3	1	0	1	0	—		—		36	3
Monaco	2017–18	Ligue 1	1	0	—		—		—		1 (Note: Appearance in Trophée des Champions)	0	2	0
Nice	2017–18	Ligue 1	30	3	1	0	1	0	6 (Note: Two appearances in UEFA Champions League, four appearances and two goals in UEFA Europa League)	2	—		38	5
Nice	2018–19	Ligue 1	34	6	2	0	0	0	—		—		36	6
Nice	Total		64	9	3	0	1	0	6	2	—		74	11
Newcastle United	2019–20	Premier League	26	3	4	1	0	0	—		—		30	4
Newcastle United	2020–21	Premier League	25	3	0	0	1	0	—		—		26	3
Newcastle United	2021–22	Premier League	35	5	1	0	1	0	—		—		37	5
Newcastle United	2022–23	Premier League	25	1	0	0	6	0	—		—		31	1
Newcastle United	Total		111	12	5	1	8	0	—		—		124	13
Al-Ahli	2023–24	Saudi Pro League	30	4	1	0	—		—		—		31	4
Fenerbahçe (loan)	2024–25	Süper Lig	20	4	2	0	—		9 (Note: Two appearances in UEFA Champions League, seven appearances in UEFA Europa League)	0	—		31	4
América	2025–26	Liga MX	16	3	—		—		—		—		16	3
Lens	2025–26	Ligue 1	10	3	3	1	—		—		—		13	4
Charlotte FC	2026	Major League Soccer	14	2	—		—		—		1 (Note: Appearance in Leagues Cup)	0	15	2
Career total			350	48	20	2	10	0	17	2	2	0	399	52

== Honours ==
Newcastle United

- EFL Cup runner-up: 2022–23

Lens

- Coupe de France: 2025–26

Individual

- Premier League Goal of the Month: August 2022
- North East FWA Player of the Year: 2021
