= Matthieu Udol =

French footballer (born 1996)

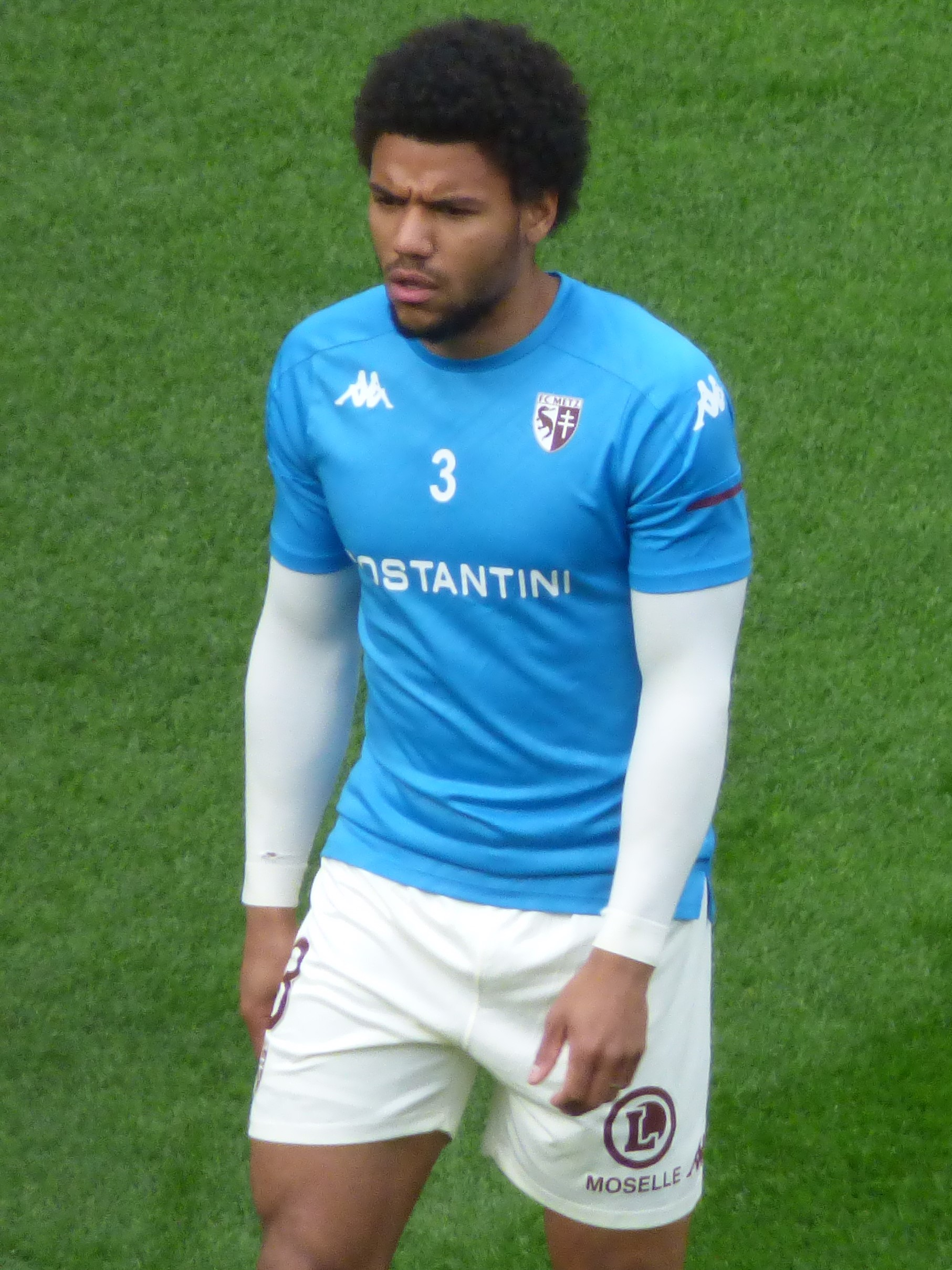
- Udol with Metz in 2021

Personal information
- Full name: Matthieu Marc Udol
- Date of birth: 20 March 1996 (age 30)
- Place of birth: Metz, France
- Height: 1.78 m (5 ft 10 in)
- Position: Defender

Team information
- Current team: Lens
- Number: 14

Senior career*
Years	Team	Apps	(Gls)
2013–2019	Metz B	51	(4)
2015	→ Seraing (loan)	12	(3)
2015–2025	Metz	171	(11)
2025–	Lens	42	(3)
- * Club domestic league appearances and goals as of 30 October 2026

Matthieu Marc Udol (French pronunciation: [matjø ydɔl]; born 20 March 1996) is a French professional footballer who plays as a defender for Ligue 1 club Lens.

== Career ==
=== Metz ===
Udol joined Metz's academy at the age of 10, from SC Marly.

In June 2015, Udol signed his first professional contract with FC Metz, valid for five years. He moved on loan to RFC Seraing in August 2015, where he scored thrice in 12 Belgian Second Division matches, before returning to Metz in January 2016.

He ruptured his anterior cruciate ligament in his right knee in December 2018.

In May 2020, Udol extended his contract with Metz until summer 2024.

He again suffered an ACL injury in his right knee, the fourth of his career, in November 2021.

In August 2023, he extended his Metz contract to 2027.

=== Lens ===
On 15 July 2025, RC Lens announced the signing of Udol on a three-year contract for a fee of €3,500,000. He made 40 appearances in all competitions in his first season with the club, scoring thrice, as Lens finished second in the 2025–26 Ligue 1. He also played in Lens' victory in the 2026 Coupe de France final.

== Personal life ==
Born in metropolitan France, Udol is of Guadeloupean descent.

== Career statistics ==
As of match played 30 October 2026

Appearances and goals by club, season, and competition
Club	Season	League			National cup		League cup		Europe		Other		Total	
Club	Season	Division	Apps	Goals	Apps	Goals	Apps	Goals	Apps	Goals	Apps	Goals	Apps	Goals
Metz B	2013–14	CFA 2	9	0	—		—		—		—		9	0
Metz B	2014–15	Ligue 3	28	1	—		—		—		—		28	1
Metz B	2015–16	CFA 2	3	1	—		—		—		—		3	1
Metz B	2016–17	CFA 2	8	1	—		—		—		—		8	1
Metz B	2017–18	CFA 2	2	1	—		—		—		—		2	1
Metz B	2019–20	CFA 2	1	0	—		—		—		—		1	0
Metz B	Total		51	4	—		—		—		—		51	4
Metz	2015–16	Ligue 2	8	0	0	0	0	0	—		—		8	0
Metz	2016–17	Ligue 1	3	0	0	0	0	0	—		—		3	0
Metz	2017–18	Ligue 1	6	0	0	0	0	0	—		—		6	0
Metz	2018–19	Ligue 2	5	0	0	0	0	0	—		—		5	0
Metz	2019–20	Ligue 1	13	0	0	0	1	0	—		—		14	0
Metz	2020–21	Ligue 1	25	0	2	0	—		—		—		27	0
Metz	2021–22	Ligue 1	12	1	0	0	—		—		—		12	1
Metz	2022–23	Ligue 2	38	3	3	0	—		—		—		41	3
Metz	2023–24	Ligue 1	30	3	0	0	—		—		2 (Note: Appearances in Ligue 1 relegation/promotion play-offs)	0	32	3
Metz	2024–25	Ligue 2	31	4	3	0	—		—		3	2	37	6
Metz	Total		171	11	8	0	1	0	—		5	2	185	13
Seraing (loan)	2015–16	Belgian Second Division	12	3	1	0	—		—		—		13	3
Lens	2025–26	Ligue 1	34	1	6	2	—		—		—		40	3
Lens	2026–27	Ligue 1	8	2	0	0	—		3 (Note: Appearances in UEFA Champions League)	0	1 (Note: Appearance in Trophée des Champions)	0	12	2
Lens	Total		42	3	6	2	—		3	0	1	0	52	5
Career total			276	22	15	2	1	0	3	0	6	1	301	25

== Honours ==
Lens

- Coupe de France: 2025–26
- Trophée des Champions: 2026

Individual

- UNFP Ligue 2 Team of the Year: 2024–25
