= Saud Abdulhamid =

Saudi Arabian footballer (born 1999)

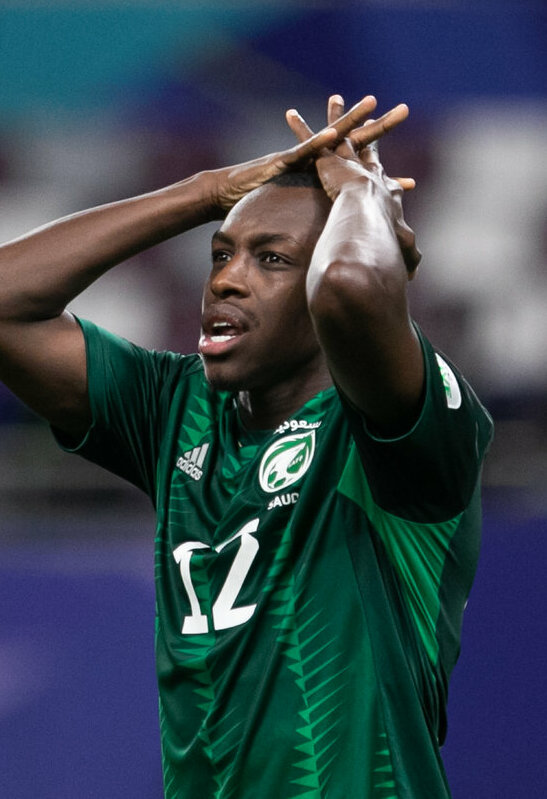
- Abdulhamid with Saudi Arabia at the 2023 AFC Asian Cup

Personal information
- Full name: Saud Abdullah Salem Abdulhamid
- Date of birth: 18 July 1999 (age 27)
- Place of birth: Jeddah, Saudi Arabia
- Height: 1.71 m (5 ft 7 in)
- Position: Right-back

Team information
- Current team: Lens
- Number: 23

Youth career
- 2012–2018: Al-Ittihad

Senior career*
Years	Team	Apps	(Gls)
2018–2022	Al-Ittihad	75	(2)
2022–2024	Al-Hilal	72	(4)
2024–2026	Roma	4	(0)
2025–2026	→ Lens (loan)	25	(2)
2026–	Lens	5	(0)

International career^{‡}
2018–2019	Saudi Arabia U20	16	(1)
2019–2022	Saudi Arabia U23	24	(2)
2019–	Saudi Arabia	60	(1)
Medal record
Men's football
Representing Saudi Arabia
AFC U-23 Asian Cup
Winner	2022 Uzbekistan
AFC U-19 Championship
Winner	2018 Indonesia
- * Club domestic league appearances and goals as of 21:33, 8 November 2026 (UTC) ‡ National team caps and goals as of 17 November 2026

Saud Abdullah Salem Abdulhamid (Arabic: سُعُود عَبْد الله سَالِم عَبْد الْحَمِيد; born 18 July 1999) is a Saudi Arabian professional footballer who plays as a right-back for Ligue 1 club Lens and the Saudi Arabia national team.

Abdulhamid previously played for Saudi Pro League clubs Al-Ittihad and Al-Hilal.

== Club career ==
=== Al-Ittihad and Al-Hilal ===
Abdulhamid started his career at Al-Ittihad before joining Al-Hilal in 2022, where he achieved six domestic titles.

=== Roma ===
On 27 August 2024, Abdulhamid signed for Serie A club Roma for €2.5 million. A month later, on 26 September, he made his debut in a 1–1 draw against Athletic Bilbao in the Europa League, becoming the first Saudi player to feature in European competitions. On 24 November, he made his league debut as a substitute in a 1–0 away defeat against Napoli, to become the first Saudi to play in Serie A. A month later, on 12 December, Abdulhamid scored his first goal for Roma in a 3–0 win against Braga in the Europa League, becoming the first Saudi player to score in a European continental competition.

=== Lens ===
On 3 August 2025, Abdulhamid joined Ligue 1 club Lens on a one-year loan for the 2025–26 season, with an option to buy. On 16 August 2025, he made his league debut in Lens' 0–1 defeat to Olympique Lyonnais, becoming the first-ever Saudi to play in Ligue 1. Later that year, on 19 December, he netted his first goal and provided an assist in a 3–1 victory over Feignies in the Coupe de France.

He scored his first league goal in a 3–0 win over Metz on 8 March 2026, to become the first Saudi to score in Ligue 1. On 22 May 2026, he started in the Coupe de France final, helping his club secure the title with a 3–1 victory over Nice and becoming the first Saudi to win the Coupe de France and a major European trophy.

On 4 June 2026, Lens exercised the buy option in Abdulhamid's loan deal, making his move permanent and extending his contract until 2029. Later that year, on 16 August, he achieved his second title with the club, following a 1–0 victory over Paris Saint-Germain in the 2026 Trophée des Champions.

== International career ==
Abdulhamid made his debut for the Saudi Arabia national team in 2019 in a 1–1 draw against Mali. He represented his country at the 2020 Summer Olympics, 2022 FIFA World Cup, and 2023 AFC Asian Cup.

On 31 May 2026, he was named in the 26-man squad for the 2026 FIFA World Cup.

== Career statistics ==
=== Club ===
As of match played 8 November 2026

Appearances and goals by club, season and competition
Club	Season	League			National cup (Note: Includes King's Cup, Coupe de France)		Continental		Other		Total	
Club	Season	Division	Apps	Goals	Apps	Goals	Apps	Goals	Apps	Goals	Apps	Goals
Al-Ittihad	2018–19	Saudi Pro League	15	0	5	0	2 (Note: Appearances in AFC Champions League)	0	0	0	22	0
Al-Ittihad	2019–20	Saudi Pro League	24	1	1	0	4	0	4 (Note: Appearance(s) in Arab Club Champions Cup)	0	33	1
Al-Ittihad	2020–21	Saudi Pro League	28	1	2	0	—		2	0	32	1
Al-Ittihad	2021–22	Saudi Pro League	8	0	0	0	—		1	0	9	0
Al-Ittihad	Total		75	2	8	0	6	0	7	0	96	2
Al-Hilal	2021–22	Saudi Pro League	13	0	3	0	5	0	2 (Note: Appearances in FIFA Club World Cup)	0	23	0
Al-Hilal	2022–23	Saudi Pro League	27	1	3	0	5	0	4 (Note: One appearance in Saudi Super Cup, three appearances in FIFA Club World Cup)	0	39	1
Al-Hilal	2023–24	Saudi Pro League	32	3	5	1	12	0	8 (Note: Six appearances in Arab Club Champions Cup, two appearances in Saudi Super Cup)	0	57	4
Al-Hilal	2024–25	Saudi Pro League	0	0	—		—		2 (Note: Appearances in Saudi Super Cup)	0	2	0
Al-Hilal	Total		72	4	11	1	22	0	16	0	121	5
Roma	2024–25	Serie A	4	0	0	0	4 (Note: Appearances in UEFA Europa League)	1	—		8	1
Lens (loan)	2025–26	Ligue 1	25	2	6	1	—		—		31	3
Lens	2026–27	Ligue 1	5	0	0	0	3 (Note: Appearances in UEFA Champions League)	0	1 (Note: Appearance in Trophée des Champions)	0	9	0
Career total			181	8	25	2	35	1	23	0	265	11

=== International ===
As of match played 17 November 2026

Appearances and goals by national team and year
National team	Year	Apps	Goals
Saudi Arabia	2019	4	0
Saudi Arabia	2021	8	0
Saudi Arabia	2022	14	1
Saudi Arabia	2023	5	0
Saudi Arabia	2024	10	0
Saudi Arabia	2025	10	0
Saudi Arabia	2026	9	0
Total		60	1

Scores and results list Saudi Arabia's goal tally first.

List of international goals scored by Saud Abdulhamid
No.	Date	Venue	Opponent	Score	Result	Competition
1	6 November 2022	Mohammed Bin Zayed Stadium, Abu Dhabi, United Arab Emirates	Iceland	1–0	1–0	Friendly

== Honours ==
Al-Hilal

- Saudi Pro League: 2021–22, 2023–24
- King's Cup: 2022–23, 2023–24
- Saudi Super Cup: 2023, 2024

Lens

- Coupe de France: 2025–26
- Trophée des Champions: 2026

Saudi Arabia U20

- AFC U-19 Championship: 2018

Saudi Arabia U23

- AFC U-23 Asian Cup: 2022

Individual

- Saudi Pro League Young Player of the Month: October 2020, December 2020
