= Souleymane Sagnan =

Footballer (born 2005)

Personal information
- Date of birth: 6 May 2005 (age 21)
- Place of birth: Saint-Denis, France
- Height: 1.87 m (6 ft 2 in)
- Position: Centre-back

Team information
- Current team: Lens
- Number: 31

Youth career
- 2020–2024: Lens

Senior career*
Years	Team	Apps	(Gls)
2023–2025	Lens B	27	(0)
2025–	Lens	3	(0)
2025–2026	→ Caen (loan)	17	(0)

International career^{‡}
2025–	Mali U23	1	(0)
- * Club domestic league appearances and goals as of 5 September 2026 ‡ National team caps and goals as of 3 June 2025

Souleymane Sagnan (born 6 May 2005) is a professional footballer who plays as a centre-back for Ligue 1 club Lens. Born in France, he represents Mali at youth international level.

== Club career ==
Sagnan joined the youth academy of Lens in 2020. He signed his first professional contract with the club in July 2025. On 31 August 2025, he joined Caen on a season-long loan deal. Five days later, on 5 September, he made his debut for Caen in a goalless draw against Dijon.

On 16 July 2026, Sagnan extended his contract with Lens until June 2030. He made his senior team debut for Lens on 22 August 2026 in a 5–2 win over Auxerre.

== International career ==
Sagnan is eligible to represent France, Mali and Mauritania at international level. In May 2025, he was called up to the Mali under-23 squad for the 2025 Maurice Revello Tournament. He made his debut for the team on 3 June 2025 in a 2–1 defeat to Panama.

== Personal life ==
Sagnan is of Malian and Mauritanian descent. He is the younger brother of Modibo Sagnan, who is also a footballer.

== Career statistics ==
As of match played 10 September 2026

Appearances and goals by club, season and competition
Club	Season	League			Cup (Note: Includes Coupe de France)		Continental		Other		Total	
Club	Season	Division	Apps	Goals	Apps	Goals	Apps	Goals	Apps	Goals	Apps	Goals
Lens B	2023–24	Championnat National 3	8	0	—		—		—		8	0
Lens B	2024–25	Championnat National 3	19	0	—		—		—		19	0
Lens B	Total		27	0	0	0	0	0	0	0	27	0
Lens	2025–26	Ligue 1	0	0	0	0	—		—		0	0
Lens	2026–27	Ligue 1	3	0	0	0	1 (Note: Appearances in UEFA Champions League)	0	0	0	4	0
Lens	Total		3	0	0	0	1	0	0	0	4	0
Caen (loan)	2025–26	Championnat National	17	0	1	0	—		—		18	0
Career total			47	0	1	0	1	0	0	0	49	0

== Honours ==
Lens

- Trophée des Champions: 2026
