= Nidal Čelik =

Bosnian footballer (born 2006)

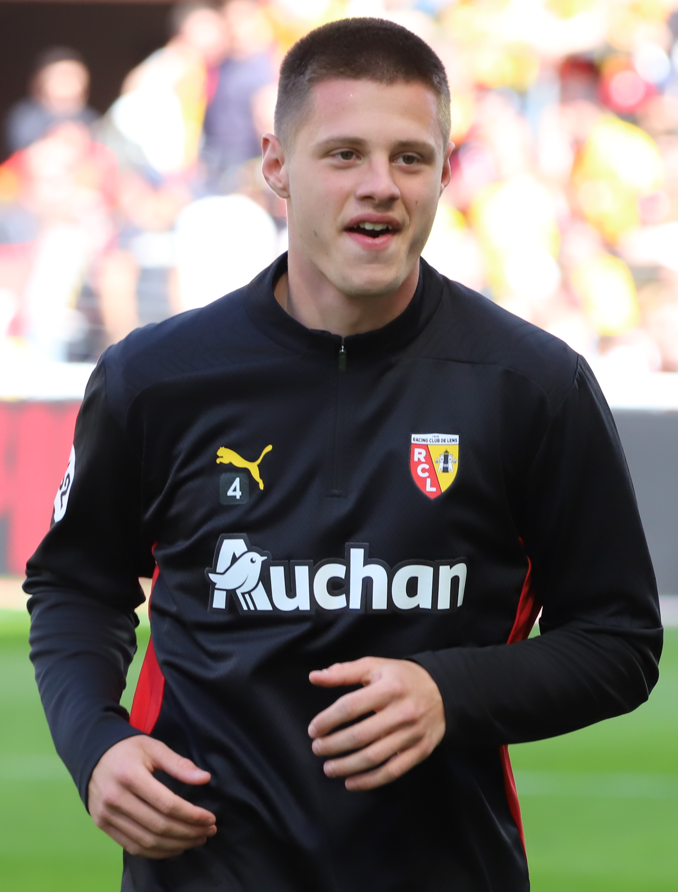
- Čelik with Lens in 2025

Personal information
- Date of birth: 17 July 2006 (age 20)
- Place of birth: Sarajevo, Bosnia and Herzegovina
- Height: 1.92 m (6 ft 4 in)
- Position: Centre-back

Team information
- Current team: Lens
- Number: 4

Youth career
- 2017–2023: Sarajevo

Senior career*
Years	Team	Apps	(Gls)
2023–2025	Sarajevo	25	(0)
2025–	Lens	8	(0)

International career^{‡}
2021	Bosnia and Herzegovina U15	4	(0)
2022–2023	Bosnia and Herzegovina U17	12	(1)
2023–2024	Bosnia and Herzegovina U19	12	(0)
2023–	Bosnia and Herzegovina U21	9	(0)
2026–	Bosnia and Herzegovina	2	(0)
- * Club domestic league appearances and goals as of 17 May 2026 ‡ National team caps and goals as of 6 October 2026

Nidal Čelik (pronounced [nǐdal tʃělik]; born 17 July 2006) is a Bosnian professional footballer who plays as a centre-back for Ligue 1 club Lens and the Bosnia and Herzegovina national team.

Čelik started his professional career at Sarajevo, before joining Lens in 2025.

A former youth international for Bosnia and Herzegovina, Čelik made his senior international debut in 2025.

== Club career ==
=== Sarajevo ===
Čelik came through the youth academy of his hometown club Sarajevo, which he joined in 2017. In July 2022, he signed his first professional contract with the team. He made his professional debut in a Bosnian Cup game against Sloga Uskoplje on 27 September 2023 at the age of 17. Two months later, he made his league debut against GOŠK Gabela.

He signed a new three-year deal with the side in June 2024.

In November, he was named squad captain.

=== Lens ===
In February 2025, Čelik moved to French outfit Lens on a contract until June 2029. On 14 February 2026, he made his official debut for the team against Paris FC. He won his first trophy with the club on 22 May, by beating Lille in the Coupe de France final.

== International career ==
Čelik represented Bosnia and Herzegovina at all youth levels.

In November 2024, he received his first senior call up, for 2024–25 UEFA Nations League A games against Germany and the Netherlands, but had to wait until 29 May 2026 to make his debut in a friendly game against North Macedonia.

In June 2026, Čelik was named in Bosnia and Herzegovina's squad for the 2026 FIFA World Cup, but had to withdraw due to an injury.

== Career statistics ==
=== Club ===
As of match played 17 May 2026

Appearances and goals by club, season and competition
Club	Season	League			National cup (Note: Includes Bosnian Cup, Coupe de France)		Continental		Total	
Club	Season	Division	Apps	Goals	Apps	Goals	Apps	Goals	Apps	Goals
Sarajevo	2023–24	Bosnian Premier League	10	0	1	0	–		11	0
Sarajevo	2024–25	Bosnian Premier League	15	0	0	0	4 (Note: Appearances in UEFA Conference League)	0	19	0
Sarajevo	Total		25	0	1	0	4	0	30	0
Lens	2025–26	Ligue 1	8	0	1	0	–		9	0
Lens	2026–27	Ligue 1	0	0	0	0	0	0	0	0
Lens	Total		8	0	1	0	0	0	9	0
Career total			33	0	2	0	4	0	39	0

=== International ===
As of match played 6 June 2026

Appearances and goals by national team and year
National team	Year	Apps	Goals
Bosnia and Herzegovina
Bosnia and Herzegovina	2026	2	0
Total		2	0

== Honours ==
Lens

- Coupe de France: 2025–26
- Trophée des Champions: 2026
