= 2026 Trophée des Champions =

Football match in France

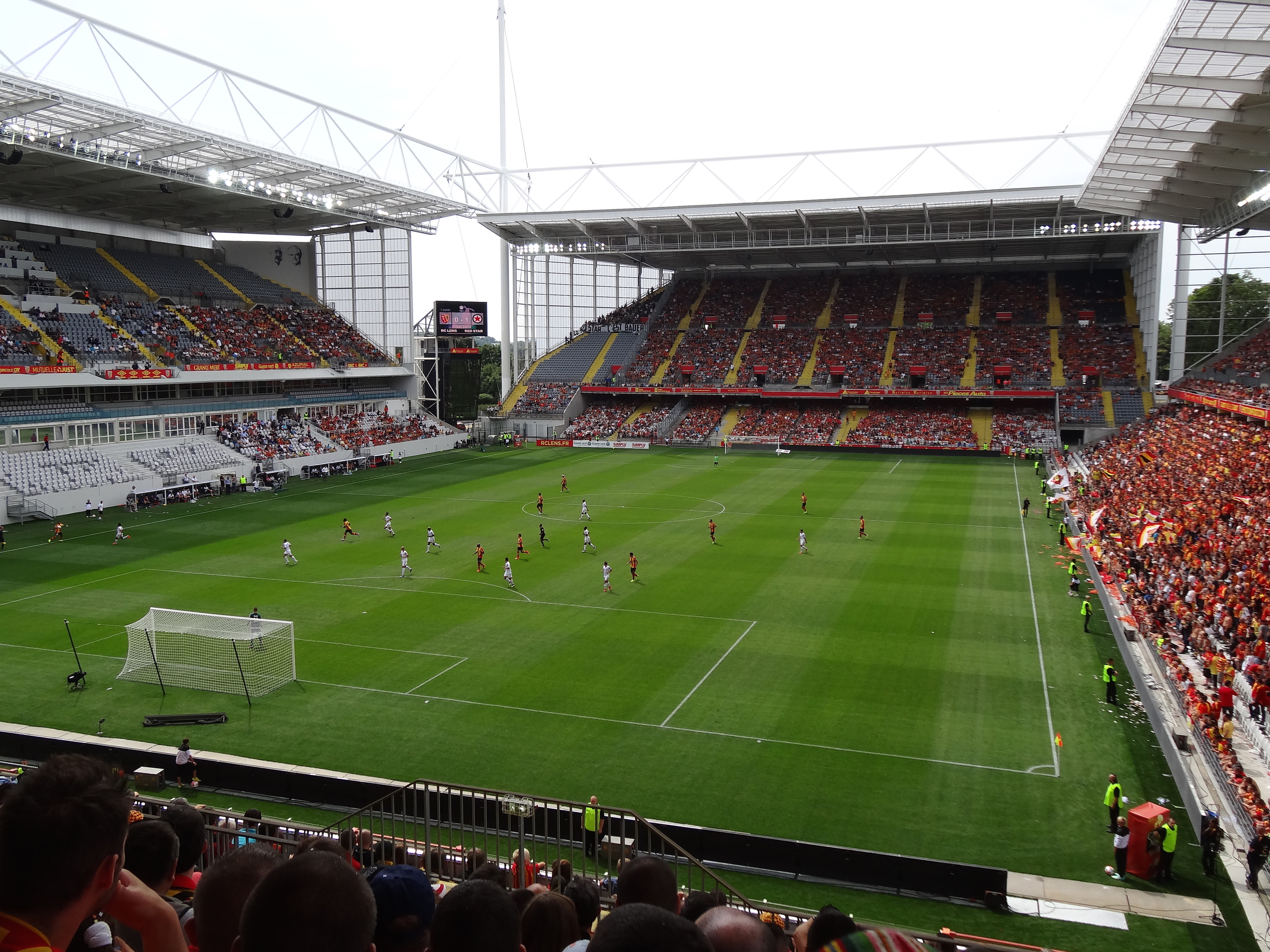
- The Stade Bollaert-Delelis hosted the match
- Event: Trophée des Champions
| Lens | Paris Saint-Germain |
| 1 | 0 |
- Date: 16 August 2026
- Venue: Stade Bollaert-Delelis, Lens, France
- Man of the Match: Florian Thauvin (Lens)
- Referee: Jérémie Pignard
- Attendance: 38,223

The 2026 Trophée des Champions was the 31st edition of the French super cup. The match was contested by Paris Saint-Germain, the winners of the 2025–26 Ligue 1 title, and Lens, the winners of the 2025–26 Coupe de France. Both sides faced each other in this tournament previously in 1998. It took place on 16 August 2026 at the Stade Bollaert-Delelis in Lens, France.

Lens won the match 1–0 for their first Trophée des Champions title.

== Match ==
=== Details ===
16 August 2026
20:45 CEST

| Lens | 1–0 | Paris Saint-Germain |
|---|---|---|
| Thauvin 32' | Report |

Stade Bollaert-Delelis, Lens
Attendance: 38,223
Referee: Jérémie Pignard

| Lens | Paris Saint-Germain |

| GK | 40 | (France) Robin Risser |
| CB | 32 | (France) Kyllian Antonio | (red card) 39' |
| CB | 25 | (France) Ismaëlo Ganiou |
| CB | 3 | (Poland) Maik Nawrocki |
| RM | 23 | (Saudi Arabia) Saud Abdulhamid |
| CM | 27 | (France) Michaël Cuisance | | (substituted off) 64' |
| CM | 87 | (Algeria) Yacine Titraoui | | (substituted off) 81' |
| LM | 14 | (France) Matthieu Udol |
| AM | 10 | (France) Florian Thauvin (c) | | (substituted off) 75' |
| AM | 19 | (Senegal) Abdallah Sima | | (substituted off) 75' |
| CF | 29 | (Croatia) Franjo Ivanović | | (substituted off) 46' |
Substitutes:
| GK | 16 | (France) Mathieu Gorgelin |
| DF | 2 | (France) Ruben Aguilar | | (substituted on) 46' |
| DF | 31 | (Mali) Souleymane Sagnan |
| MF | 5 | (Montenegro) Andrija Bulatović | (yellow card) 90' | (substituted on) 64' |
| MF | 21 | (Mali) Amadou Haidara | | (substituted on) 81' |
| MF | 22 | (Poland) Michał Skóraś | | (substituted on) 75' |
| MF | 38 | (Portugal) Mezian Mesloub |
| FW | 7 | (France) Florian Sotoca |
| FW | 18 | (Ivory Coast) Rayan Fofana | | (substituted on) 75' |
Manager:
(Germany) Dino Toppmöller

| GK | 39 | (Russia) Matvey Safonov |
| RB | 2 | (Morocco) Achraf Hakimi (c) | (yellow card) 90' |
| CB | 6 | (Ukraine) Illia Zabarnyi |
| CB | 51 | (Ecuador) Willian Pacho |
| LB | 12 | (France) Lucas Digne | | (substituted off) 60' |
| CM | 33 | (France) Warren Zaïre-Emery | | (substituted off) 82' |
| CM | 17 | (Portugal) Vitinha |
| CM | 4 | (Brazil) Lucas Beraldo | | (substituted off) 60' |
| RF | 11 | (France) Maghnes Akliouche | | (substituted off) 60' |
| CF | 14 | (France) Désiré Doué | (yellow card) 64' |
| LF | 7 | (Georgia (country)) Khvicha Kvaratskhelia | | (substituted off) 70' |
Substitutes:
| GK | 30 | (France) Lucas Chevalier |
| DF | 5 | (Brazil) Marquinhos |
| DF | 21 | (France) Lucas Hernandez |
| DF | 25 | (Portugal) Nuno Mendes | (red card) 87' | (substituted on) 60' |
| MF | 8 | (Spain) Fabián Ruiz | (yellow card) 88' | (substituted on) 60' |
| MF | 24 | (France) Senny Mayulu | | (substituted on) 70' |
| FW | 27 | (Spain) Dro Fernández | | (substituted on) 82' |
| FW | 11 | (France) Ousmane Dembélé | | (substituted on) 60' |
| FW | 47 | (France) Quentin Ndjantou |
Manager:
(Spain) Luis Enrique

Man of the Match:
Florian Thauvin (Lens)

Assistant referees:
Hicham Zakrani
Gwenaël Pasqualotti
Fourth official:
Jérémy Stinat
Video assistant referee:
Mathieu Vernice
Assistant video assistant referee:
Cyril Gringore

Match rules

- 90 minutes
- Penalty shoot-out if scores level
- Maximum of nine named substitutes
- Maximum of five substitutions
- Maximum of three substitution opportunities
