= Florian Sotoca =

French footballer (born 1990)

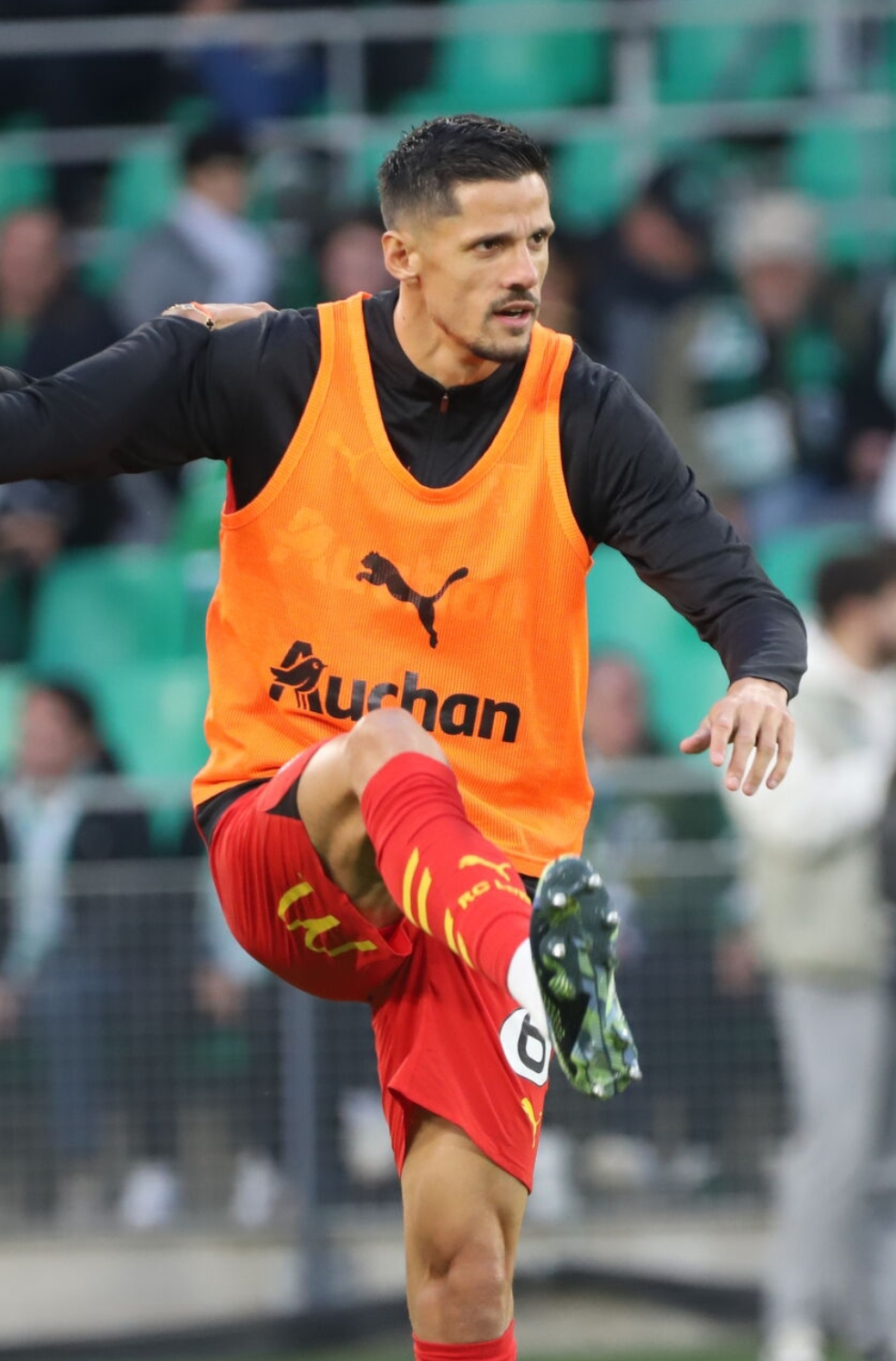
- Sotoca with Lens in 2024

Personal information
- Date of birth: 25 October 1990 (age 36)
- Place of birth: Narbonne, France
- Height: 1.87 m (6 ft 2 in)
- Position: Striker

Team information
- Current team: Lens
- Number: 7

Youth career
- 1996–2009: FU Narbonne

Senior career*
Years	Team	Apps	(Gls)
2012–2013	FU Narbonne	22	(8)
2013–2014	Martigues	26	(1)
2014–2015	Béziers	14	(5)
2015–2016	Montpellier B	28	(4)
2015–2016	Montpellier	1	(0)
2016–2019	Grenoble	95	(26)
2019–	Lens	227	(39)
- * Club domestic league appearances and goals as of 30 October 2026

Florian Sotoca (born 25 October 1990) is a French professional footballer who plays as a striker for Ligue 1 club Lens.

== Club career ==
Sotoca joined Grenoble in 2016.

On 9 July 2019, Sotoca joined Ligue 2 club RC Lens on a permanent transfer. On 13 December 2021, he signed a contract extension, keeping him at the club until June 2024.

On 7 August 2022, Sotoca scored a hat-trick for Lens in a 3–2 victory over Brest in Ligue 1.

On 24 January 2023, he signed a new contract extension with Lens until 2026.

== Career statistics ==
As of match played 30 October 2026

Appearances and goals by club, season and competition
Club	Season	League			Coupe de France		Coupe de la Ligue		Europe		Other		Total	
Club	Season	Division	Apps	Goals	Apps	Goals	Apps	Goals	Apps	Goals	Apps	Goals	Apps	Goals
Montpellier	2015–16	Ligue 1	1	0	0	0	1	0	—		—		2	0
Grenoble	2016–17	CFA	27	6	1	0	—		—		—		28	6
Grenoble	2017–18	Ligue 3	31	8	4	4	—		—		2 (Note: Appearances in Ligue 2 relegation/promotion play-offs)	1	37	13
Grenoble	2018–19	Ligue 2	37	12	3	0	1	0	—		—		41	12
Grenoble	Total		95	26	8	4	1	0	—		2	1	102	31
Lens	2019–20	Ligue 2	26	8	2	0	2	1	—		—		30	9
Lens	2020–21	Ligue 1	33	8	2	0	—		—		—		35	8
Lens	2021–22	Ligue 1	35	6	3	0	—		—		—		38	6
Lens	2022–23	Ligue 1	38	7	4	1	—		—		—		42	8
Lens	2023–24	Ligue 1	32	7	1	1	—		8 (Note: Six appearances in UEFA Champions League, two appearances in UEFA Europa League)	0	—		41	8
Lens	2024–25	Ligue 1	31	1	1	0	—		2 (Note: Appearances in UEFA Europa League)	0	—		34	1
Lens	2025–26	Ligue 1	26	1	4	1	—		—		—		30	2
Lens	2026–27	Ligue 1	6	1	0	0	—		1 (Note: Appearances in UEFA Champions League)	0	—		7	1
Lens	Total		227	39	19	3	2	1	11	0	—		260	43
Career total			323	65	25	7	4	1	11	0	2	1	364	74

== Honours ==
Lens

- Coupe de France: 2025–26
- Trophée des Champions: 2026
