= Mamadou Sangaré =

Malian footballer (born 2002)

- Sangaré in 2026

Personal information
- Date of birth: 26 June 2002 (age 24)
- Place of birth: Bamako, Mali
- Height: 1.81 m (5 ft 11 in)
- Position: Midfielder

Team information
- Current team: Brentford
- Number: 18

Youth career
- Yeelen Olympique

Senior career*
Years	Team	Apps	(Gls)
2020–2024	Red Bull Salzburg	0	(0)
2020–2021	→ FC Liefering (loan)	11	(1)
2021–2022	→ Grazer AK (loan)	26	(5)
2022–2023	→ Zulte Waregem (loan)	10	(1)
2023–2024	→ TSV Hartberg (loan)	46	(3)
2024–2025	Rapid Wien	30	(2)
2025–2026	Lens	29	(3)
2026–	Brentford	5	(0)

International career^{‡}
2023–	Mali U23	7	(3)
2024–	Mali	19	(0)
Medal record
Representing Mali
U-23 Africa Cup of Nations
Bronze medal – third place	Morocco 2023	U-23 Team
- * Club domestic league appearances and goals as of 19 September 2026 ‡ National team caps and goals as of 4 October 2026

Mamadou Sangaré (born 26 June 2002) is a Malian professional footballer who plays as a midfielder for Premier League club Brentford and the Mali national team.

== Club career ==
=== Red Bull Salzburg ===
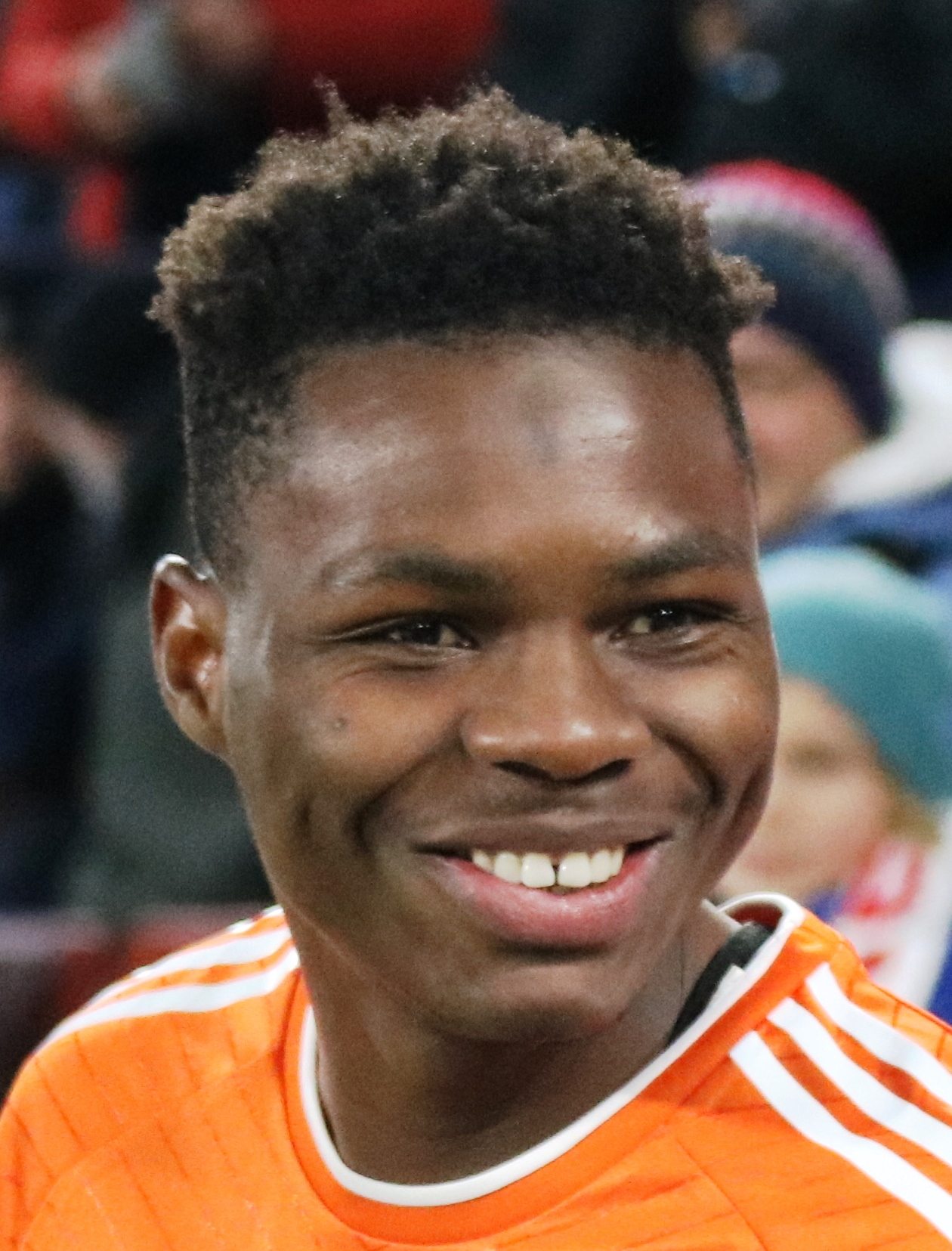
Sangaré in 2023

Sangaré joined Red Bull Salzburg in September 2020, signing a contract until 2025, and was assigned to their reserve side, FC Liefering. He was later loaned to Grazer AK for the 2021–22 season.

For the 2022–23 season, Sangaré was loaned to Zulte Waregem in Belgium. On 6 February 2023, Sangaré moved on a new loan to TSV Hartberg.

=== Rapid Wien ===
On 1 July 2024, Rapid Wien signed Sangaré until 2028. Later that year, on 25 September, he scored his first goal for the club in a 3–1 away win over SR Donaufeld in the Austrian Cup. In the UEFA conference league quarter final against Djurgårdens IF he received a straight red card in the 7th minute and Rapid Wien got knocked out of the tournament.

=== Lens ===
On 20 August 2025, Sangaré moved to Lens in France with a five-year contract. Later that year, on 8 November, he scored his first goal in a 4–1 away victory over Monaco. In the 2025–26 season, Sangaré was named in the Ligue 1 Team of the Season, won the Prix Marc-Vivien Foé for the league's best African player, and helped the club finish second in Ligue 1 and win the Coupe de France for the first time in its history.

=== Brentford ===
On 1 August 2026, Brentford announced the signing of Sangaré on a five-year contract with a club option for a further year. The reported fee of £41.1 million represented a club-record for Brentford. He was named player of the match after an impressive performance in his Premier League debut, helping Brentford win 3–0 against Tottenham.

== International career ==
In June 2023, Sangaré was included in the final squad of the Malian under-23 national team for the 2023 U-23 Africa Cup of Nations, hosted in Morocco, where the Eagles finished in third place and qualified for the 2024 Summer Olympics in Paris.

On 11 December 2025, Sangaré was called up to the Mali squad for the 2025 Africa Cup of Nations.

== Style of play ==
Sangaré is described as a versatile box-to-box midfielder known for his ball-winning ability, technical quality, and intelligence in possession. He combines defensive work rate with his ability to progress the ball through carrying and passing, while his versatility allows him to operate as both a deeper midfielder and a more advanced number eight. A player who is often characterized as energetic all-rounder, Sangaré ranked among Ligue 1's best midfielders for tackles won, ground duels and interceptions, while also contributing with his dribbling, passing and attacking output.

Speaking after his transfer to the Premier League, his former coach Adama Diarra said Brentford's emphasis on developing young players made the club a perfect fit for the Malian midfielder and backed him to adapt successfully to English football.

== Career statistics ==
=== Club ===
As of match played 19 September 2026

Appearances and goals by club, season and competition
Club	Season	League			National cup (Note: Includes Austrian Cup, Belgian Cup, Coupe de France)		League cup		Europe		Other		Total	
Club	Season	Division	Apps	Goals	Apps	Goals	Apps	Goals	Apps	Goals	Apps	Goals	Apps	Goals
FC Liefering (loan)	2020–21	Austrian 2. Liga	11	1	—		—		—		—		11	1
Grazer AK (loan)	2021–22	Austrian 2. Liga	26	5	2	0	—		—		—		31	5
Zulte Waregem (loan)	2022–23	Belgian Pro League	10	1	2	0	—		—		—		12	1
TSV Hartberg (loan)	2022–23	Austrian Bundesliga	15	2	—		—		—		—		15	2
TSV Hartberg (loan)	2023–24	Austrian Bundesliga	31	1	2	0	—		—		—		33	1
TSV Hartberg (loan)	Total		93	10	6	0	—		—		—		99	10
Rapid Wien	2024–25	Austrian Bundesliga	27	2	2	1	—		15 (Note: Six appearances in UEFA Europa League, nine appearances in UEFA Conference League)	0	—		44	3
Rapid Wien	2025–26	Austrian Bundesliga	3	0	1	0	—		2 (Note: Appearances in UEFA Conference League)	0	—		6	0
Rapid Wien	Total		30	2	4	1	—		17	0	—		51	3
Lens	2025–26	Ligue 1	29	3	4	0	—		—		—		33	3
Brentford	2026–27	Premier League	5	0	0	0	2	0	—		—		7	0
Career total			157	15	13	1	2	0	17	0	0	0	188	16

=== International ===
As of match played 4 October 2026

Appearances and goals by national team and year
National team	Year	Apps	Goals
Mali	2024	4	0
Mali	2025	9	0
Mali	2026	6	0
Total		19	0

== Honours ==
Lens

- Coupe de France: 2025–26

Mali U23

- U-23 Africa Cup of Nations bronze medal: 2023

Individual

- UNFP Ligue 1 Team of the Year: 2025–26
- Prix Marc-Vivien Foé: 2025–26
