= Rayan Fofana =

Ivorian footballer (born 2006)

Personal information
- Date of birth: 12 February 2006 (age 20)
- Place of birth: Paris, France
- Height: 1.85 m (6 ft 1 in)
- Position: Forward

Team information
- Current team: Le Havre (on loan from Lens)
- Number: 38

Youth career
- 2015–2020: Espérance Paris 19e
- 2020–2021: JA Drancy
- 2021–2024: Lens

Senior career*
Years	Team	Apps	(Gls)
2024–2025	Lens II	20	(2)
2025–	Lens	27	(5)
2026–	→ Le Havre (loan)	5	(2)

International career^{‡}
2026	France U21	2	(2)
2026–	Ivory Coast	2	(0)
- * Club domestic league appearances and goals as of 18 October 2026 ‡ National team caps and goals as of 22:41, 9 October 2026 (UTC)

Rayan Fofana (born 12 February 2006) is a professional footballer who plays as a forward for Ligue 1 club Le Havre on loan from Lens. Born in France, he plays for the Ivory Coast national team.

== Career ==
A youth product of Espérance Paris 19e and Lens, Fofana signed his first professional contract with Lens on 30 October 2024 until 2027. He made his senior and professional debut for Lens in a 4–3 Ligue 1 loss to Le Havre on 1 March 2025. Later that year, on 24 August, he scored his first goal for the club in a 2–1 away win over Le Havre.

On 31 August 2026, Fofana was loaned by Le Havre for the season.

== International career ==
In 2026, Fofana switched his allegiance to represent the Ivory Coast national team, and was called up by head coach Hervé Renard for the 2027 Africa Cup of Nations qualification matches against Ghana and Somalia, and the friendly against Cameroon on 24, 29 September and 3 October 2026.

== Personal life ==
Born in France, Fofana is of Ivorian descent and holds dual French-Ivorian citizenship.

== Career statistics ==
=== Club ===
As of match played 18 October 2026

Appearances and goals by club, season and competition
Club	Season	League			Coupe de France		Europe		Other		Total	
Club	Season	Division	Apps	Goals	Apps	Goals	Apps	Goals	Apps	Goals	Apps	Goals
Lens B	2023–24	CFA 2	7	0	—		—		—		7	0
Lens B	2024–25	CFA 2	13	2	—		—		—		13	2
Lens B	Total		20	2	—		—		—		20	2
Lens	2024–25	Ligue 1	2	0	—		—		—		2	0
Lens	2025–26	Ligue 1	24	5	4	1	—		—		28	6
Lens	2026–27	Ligue 1	0	0	0	0	0	0	1 (Note: Appearance in Trophée des Champions)	0	1	0
Lens	Total		26	5	4	1	0	0	1	0	31	6
Le Havre (loan)	2026–27	Ligue 1	5	2	0	0	—		—		5	2
Career total			51	9	4	1	0	0	1	0	56	10

=== International ===
As of match played 3 October 2026

Appearances and goals by national team and year
National team	Year	Apps	Goals
Ivory Coast	2026	2	0
Total		2	0

== Honours ==
Lens

- Coupe de France: 2025–26
- Trophée des Champions: 2026
