= Kyllian Antonio =

French footballer (born 2008)

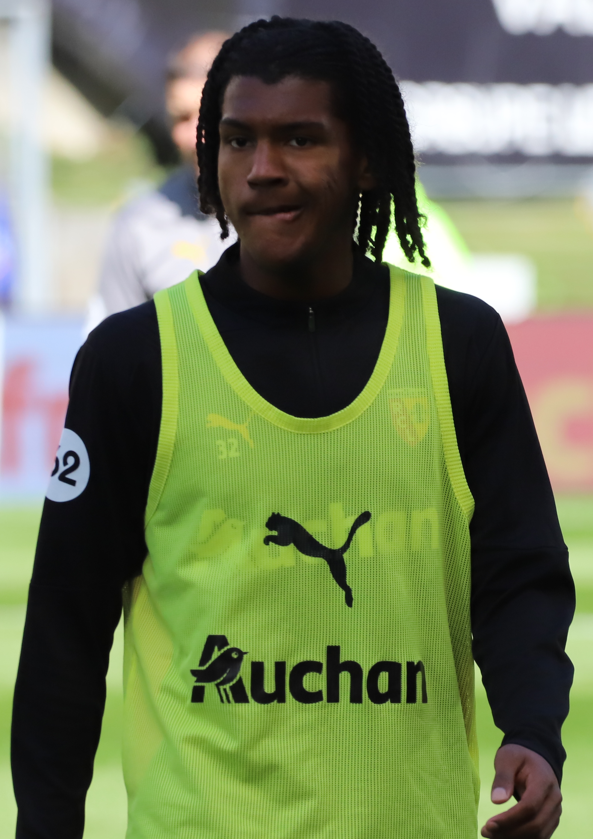

Personal information
- Full name: Kyllian Anderson Antonio
- Date of birth: 4 January 2008 (age 18)
- Place of birth: Champigny-sur-Marne, France
- Position: Defender

Team information
- Current team: Lens
- Number: 32

Youth career
- 2015–2018: Champigny FC 94
- 2018–2023: US Torcy
- 2023–2024: Lens

Senior career*
Years	Team	Apps	(Gls)
2024–2025	Lens B	5	(0)
2025–	Lens	14	(0)

International career^{‡}
2023–2024	France U16	7	(0)
2024–2025	France U17	11	(0)
2026–	France U19	1	(0)
Medal record
Men's football
Representing France
UEFA European Under-17 Championship
Runner-up	2025 Albania
- * Club domestic league appearances and goals as of 30 October 2026 ‡ National team caps and goals as of 11 November 2026

Kyllian Anderson Antonio (born 4 January 2008) is a French professional footballer who plays as a defender for Ligue 1 club Lens.

== Club career ==
Born in Champigny-sur-Marne, in the south-east of Paris' inner ring, Antonio is a youth product of US Torcy, from he joined the INF Clairefontaine in 2021.

In June 2023, he signed with Lens, where he soon started playing with the under-19, in the domestic competition and the UEFA Youth League.

The following season, he started playing with the National 3 reserve, before being first selected in the Ligue 1 squad by Will Still in October 2024. He subsequently extended its contract with the club in March 2025.

On 30 March 2025, injuries from Juma Bah and Jonathan Gradit prompted Still to start Antonio in the derby against Lille, making his professional debut with this 1–0 Ligue 1 away defeat. In the 83 minutes he played, despite some putting himself under pressure early on, he managed to put on a promising performance, earning him praises from his manager.

== International career ==
Born in France, Antonio is of Guadeloupean and Portuguese descent. He is a youth international for France, having played for the under-16 and under-17.

== Style of play ==
Antonio was described by Will Still as a very smart, mobile and fast player with a very good reading of the game, clean and calm with the ball at his feet.

== Career statistics ==
As of match played 24 October 2026

Appearances and goals by club, season and competition
Club	Season	League			Cup		Europe		Other		Total	
Club	Season	Division	Apps	Goals	Apps	Goals	Apps	Goals	Apps	Goals	Apps	Goals
Lens B	2024–25	Championnat National 2	5	0	—		—		—		5	0
Lens	2024–25	Ligue 1	3	0	—		—		—		3	0
Lens	2025–26	Ligue 1	4	0	3	0	—		—		7	0
Lens	2026–27	Ligue 1	6	0	0	0	3 (Note: Appearances in UEFA Champions League)	0	1 (Note: Appearance in Trophée des Champions)	0	10	0
Lens	Total		13	0	3	0	3	0	1	0	20	0
Career total			18	0	3	0	3	0	1	0	25	0

== Honours ==
Lens

- Coupe de France: 2025–26
- Trophée des Champions: 2026

France U17

- UEFA European Under-17 Championship runner-up: 2025
