= Ismaëlo Ganiou =

French footballer (born 2005)

Personal information
- Full name: Pierre-Ismaëlo Ganiou
- Date of birth: 14 March 2005 (age 21)
- Place of birth: Lille, France
- Height: 1.85 m (6 ft 1 in)
- Position: Centre-back

Team information
- Current team: Lens
- Number: 37

Youth career
- Lille Fives
- 2014–2015: Wasquehal
- 2015–2022: Lens

Senior career*
| Years | Team | Apps | (Gls) |
| 2022–2025 | Lens II | 47 | (3) |
| 2025 | Padova | 0 | (0) |
| 2025 | → Annecy (loan) | 12 | (1) |
| 2025– | Lens | 28 | (4) |

International career^{‡}
| 2025 | Burkina Faso | 1 | (0) |
| 2026– | France U21 | 5 | (0) |
- * Club domestic league appearances and goals as of 22:45, 17 October 2026 (UTC) ‡ National team caps and goals as of 22:13, 6 October 2026 (UTC)

Pierre-Ismaëlo Ganiou (born 14 March 2005) is a French professional footballer who plays as a centre-back for Ligue 1 club Lens.

Born in France, he represented the Burkina Faso national team in a single match in 2025 before switching to his country of birth in 2026, subsequently appearing for the France under-21 national team.

== Club career ==
Ganiou is a product of the youth academies of Lille Fives, Wasquehal and Lens, and was promoted to Lens' reserves in 2022. On 5 July 2024, he signed his first professional contract with Lens until 2027. On 27 January 2025, he transferred to Padova and immediately joined Annecy in Ligue 2 on loan for the second half of the 2024–25 season. After his loan ended, he returned to Lens. On 8 August 2026, he extended his contract with Lens until 2030.

== International career ==
Born in France, Ganiou is of Burkinabe descent and holds dual French-Burkinabe citizenship. In May 2025, he was called up to the Burkina Faso national team for a set of friendlies. He debuted with Burkina Faso in a 2–0 friendly win over Zimbabwe on 6 June 2025. In March 2026, he was called up by Gérald Baticle to the France under-21 national team for the matches against Luxembourg and Iceland.

== Career statistics ==
=== Club ===
As of match played 17 October 2026

Appearances and goals by club, season and competition
| Club | Season | League | | | Cup | | Europe | | Other | | Total | |
| Club | Season | Division | Apps | Goals | Apps | Goals | Apps | Goals | Apps | Goals | Apps | Goals |
|---|---|---|---|---|---|---|---|---|---|---|---|---|
| Lens II | 2021–22 | CFA | 1 | 0 | — | | — | | — | | 1 | 0 |
| Lens II | 2022–23 | CFA 2 | 19 | 2 | — | | — | | — | | 19 | 2 |
| Lens II | 2023–24 | CFA 2 | 22 | 1 | — | | — | | — | | 22 | 1 |
| Lens II | 2024–25 | CFA 2 | 5 | 0 | — | | — | | — | | 5 | 0 |
| Lens II | Total | | 47 | 3 | — | | — | | — | | 47 | 3 |
| Lens | 2022–23 | Ligue 1 | 0 | 0 | 0 | 0 | 0 | 0 | — | | 0 | 0 |
| Lens | 2024–25 | Ligue 1 | 0 | 0 | 0 | 0 | 0 | 0 | — | | 0 | 0 |
| Lens | Total | | 0 | 0 | 0 | 0 | 0 | 0 | — | | 0 | 0 |
| Padova | 2024–25 | Serie C | 0 | 0 | 0 | 0 | — | | 0 | 0 | 0 | 0 |
| Annecy (loan) | 2024–25 | Ligue 2 | 12 | 1 | — | | — | | — | | 12 | 1 |
| Lens | 2025–26 | Ligue 1 | 23 | 3 | 6 | 0 | — | | — | | 29 | 3 |
| Lens | 2026–27 | Ligue 1 | 5 | 1 | 0 | 0 | 2 (Note: Appearances in UEFA Champions League) | 0 | 1 (Note: Appearance in Trophée des Champions) | 0 | 8 | 1 |
| Lens | Total | | 28 | 4 | 6 | 0 | 2 | 0 | 1 | 0 | 37 | 4 |
| Career total | | | 87 | 8 | 6 | 0 | 2 | 0 | 1 | 0 | 96 | 8 |

=== International ===
As of match played 6 June 2025

Appearances and goals by national team and year
| National team | Year | Apps | Goals |
|---|---|---|---|
| Burkina Faso | 2025 | 1 | 0 |
| Total | | 1 | 0 |

== Honours ==
Lens

- Coupe de France: 2025–26
- Trophée des Champions: 2026
