= Seny Koumbassa =

French footballer (born 2007)

Personal information
- Date of birth: 20 June 2007 (age 19)
- Place of birth: Toulouse, France
- Height: 1.87 m (6 ft 2 in)
- Position: Centre-back

Team information
- Current team: Toulouse
- Number: 5

Youth career
- 2014–2016: AS Tournefeuille
- 2016–2025: Toulouse

Senior career*
Years	Team	Apps	(Gls)
2024–	Toulouse B	19	(0)
2025–	Toulouse	10	(1)

International career^{‡}
2022–2023	France U16	6	(1)
2023	France U17	1	(0)
2025	France U18	3	(0)
2025–	France U19	2	(0)
- * Club domestic league appearances and goals as of 19 May 2026 ‡ National team caps and goals as of 08:18, 18 December 2025 (UTC)

Seny Koumbassa (born 20 June 2007) is a French professional footballer who plays as a centre-back for Ligue 1 club Toulouse.

== Club career ==
Originally from the district of Le Mirail in Toulouse, Koumbassa first played for AS Tournefeuille before joining the youth academy of Toulouse FC in the summer of 2016. On 26 May 2025, he signed his first professional contract with the club. On 30 August, he made his professional debut in Ligue 1 as a substitute in a 6–3 defeat to Paris Saint-Germain. On 20 December, he made his first start for the club in a 2–1 Coupe de France victory over Lyon-La Duchère.

== International career ==
Koumbassa is a France youth international, having made his debut with the France under-16s in 2022.

== Personal life ==
Born in France, Koumbassa is of Guinean descent.
