= Amadou Haidara =

Malian footballer (born 1998)

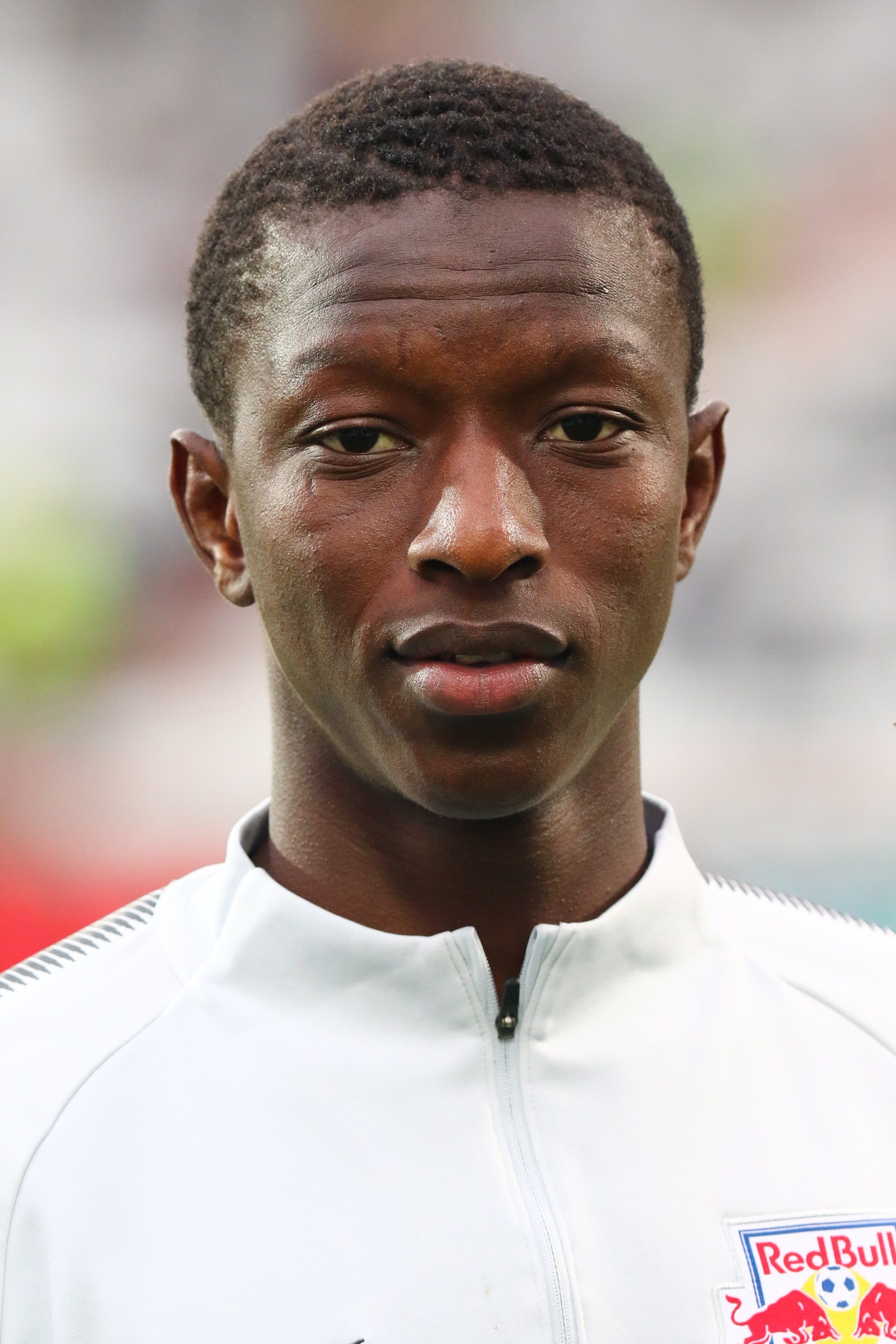
- Haidara with Red Bull Salzburg in 2018

Personal information
- Full name: Amadou Haidara
- Date of birth: 31 January 1998 (age 28)
- Place of birth: Bamako, Mali
- Height: 1.78 m (5 ft 10 in)
- Position: Midfielder

Team information
- Current team: Lens
- Number: 21

Youth career
- –2016: JMG Academy Bamako

Senior career*
Years	Team	Apps	(Gls)
2016–2019	Red Bull Salzburg	48	(6)
2016	→ FC Liefering (loan)	25	(2)
2019–2025	RB Leipzig	159	(11)
2025–	Lens	15	(1)

International career^{‡}
2015	Mali U17	7	(2)
2017	Mali U20	3	(0)
2017–	Mali	54	(2)
- * Club domestic league appearances and goals as of 30 October 2026 ‡ National team caps and goals as of 4 October 2026

Amadou Haidara (born 31 January 1998) is a Malian professional footballer who plays as a midfielder for Ligue 1 club Lens and the Mali national team.

== Club career ==
=== Red Bull Salzburg ===
Haidara started his career with the Malian side JMG Academy Bamako. In July 2015, he was signed by FC Red Bull Salzburg. He was sent out on loan to the second league side FC Liefering, which is the farm team of Red Bull Salzburg. Haidara also played for the FC Red Bull Salzburg U-19 team in the UEFA Youth League. There he scored two goals versus FK Vardar.

He made his first appearance in the third round of the 2016–17 league versus LASK Linz. He substituted Gideon Mensah after the halftime break and scored his first goal in the 48th minute for Liefering.

During the 2017–18 season, Salzburg had their best ever European campaign. They finished top of their Europa League group, for a record fourth time, before beating Real Sociedad and Borussia Dortmund thus making their first ever appearance in the UEFA Europa League semi-final. On 3 May 2018, he played in the Europa League semi-finals as Olympique de Marseille played out a 1–2 away loss but a 3–2 aggregate win to secure a place in the 2018 UEFA Europa League Final.

=== RB Leipzig ===
On 22 December 2018, Haidara was signed by German club RB Leipzig. On 30 March 2019, he scored his first Bundesliga goal in a 5–0 win over Hertha BSC. In the 2019–20 season, RB Leipzig managed to reach the Champions League semi-finals.

On 8 December 2020, he scored his first Champions League goal in a 3–2 win over Manchester United in the 2020–21 season.

=== Lens ===
On 23 December 2025, after seven years with RB Leipzig, Haidara moved to France, joining Ligue 1 club Lens on a contract until June 2029, for a reported fee of €2 million, which could rise to €3 million with performance-related add-ons.

== International career ==
Haidara played five matches for the Malian U17 team, scoring one goal. Haidara made his senior debut for the Mali national football team in a 2018 World Cup qualification tie against Ivory Coast on 6 October 2017.

He took part in his first international tournament at the 2019 Africa Cup of Nations. In December 2021, Haidara was named by head coach Mohamed Magassouba in Mali’s squad for the 2021 Africa Cup of Nations.

On 2 January 2024, he was included in the list of twenty-seven Malian players selected by Éric Chelle to compete in the 2023 Africa Cup of Nations.

On 11 December 2025, Haidara was called up to the Mali squad for the 2025 Africa Cup of Nations.

== Career statistics ==
=== Club ===
As of match played 30 October 2026

Appearances and goals by club, season and competition
Club	Season	League			National cup (Note: Includes Austrian Cup, DFB-Pokal, Coupe de France)		Europe		Other		Total	
Club	Season	Division	Apps	Goals	Apps	Goals	Apps	Goals	Apps	Goals	Apps	Goals
FC Liefering (loan)	2016–17	Austrian First League	25	2	—		—		—		25	2
Red Bull Salzburg	2016–17	Austrian Bundesliga	5	1	2	1	0	0	—		7	2
Red Bull Salzburg	2017–18	Austrian Bundesliga	31	3	6	1	18 (Note: Two appearances and one goal in UEFA Champions League, sixteen appearances and three goals in UEFA Europa League)	4	—		55	8
Red Bull Salzburg	2018–19	Austrian Bundesliga	12	2	2	0	7 (Note: Three appearances in UEFA Champions League, four appearances and one goal in UEFA Europa League)	1	—		21	3
Red Bull Salzburg	Total		48	6	10	2	25	5	—		83	13
RB Leipzig	2018–19	Bundesliga	9	1	3	0	0	0	—		12	1
RB Leipzig	2019–20	Bundesliga	19	0	2	0	7 (Note: Appearances in UEFA Champions League)	0	—		28	0
RB Leipzig	2020–21	Bundesliga	31	3	6	2	6	1	—		43	6
RB Leipzig	2021–22	Bundesliga	20	3	2	1	6 (Note: Four appearances in UEFA Champions League, two appearances in UEFA Europa League)	0	—		28	4
RB Leipzig	2022–23	Bundesliga	31	2	5	0	7	0	1 (Note: Appearance in DFL-Supercup)	0	44	2
RB Leipzig	2023–24	Bundesliga	21	2	1	0	5	0	—		27	2
RB Leipzig	2024–25	Bundesliga	28	0	4	0	8	0	—		40	0
RB Leipzig	2025–26	Bundesliga	0	0	0	0	—		—		0	0
RB Leipzig	Total		159	11	23	3	39	1	1	0	222	15
Lens	2025–26	Ligue 1	7	1	3	0	—		—		10	1
Lens	2026–27	Ligue 1	8	0	0	0	3	0	1 (Note: Appearance in Trophée des Champions)	0	12	0
Lens	Total		15	1	3	0	3	0	1	0	22	1
Career total			247	20	36	5	67	6	2	0	352	31

=== International ===
As of match played 4 October 2026

Appearances and goals by national team and year
National team	Year	Apps	Goals
Mali	2017	2	0
Mali	2018	4	0
Mali	2019	9	1
Mali	2020	2	1
Mali	2021	7	0
Mali	2022	9	0
Mali	2023	3	0
Mali	2024	10	0
Mali	2025	5	0
Mali	2026	3	0
Total		54	2

Scores and results list Mali's goal tally first, score column indicates score after each Haidara goal.

List of international goals scored by Amadou Haidara
No.	Date	Venue	Opponent	Score	Result	Competition
1	1 July 2019	Ismailia Stadium, Ismailia, Egypt	Angola	1–0	1–0	2019 Africa Cup of Nations
2	9 October 2020	Emirhan Sport Center Stadium, Side, Turkey	Ghana	3–0	3–0	Friendly

== Honours ==
Red Bull Salzburg

- Austrian Bundesliga: 2016–17, 2017–18
- Austrian Cup: 2016–17

RB Leipzig

- DFB-Pokal: 2021–22, 2022–23; runner-up: 2020–21

Lens

- Coupe de France: 2025–26
- Trophée des Champions: 2026

Mali U17

- FIFA U-17 World Cup runner-up: 2015

Individual

- Austrian Bundesliga Team of the Year: 2017–18
