= Robin Risser =

French footballer (born 2004)

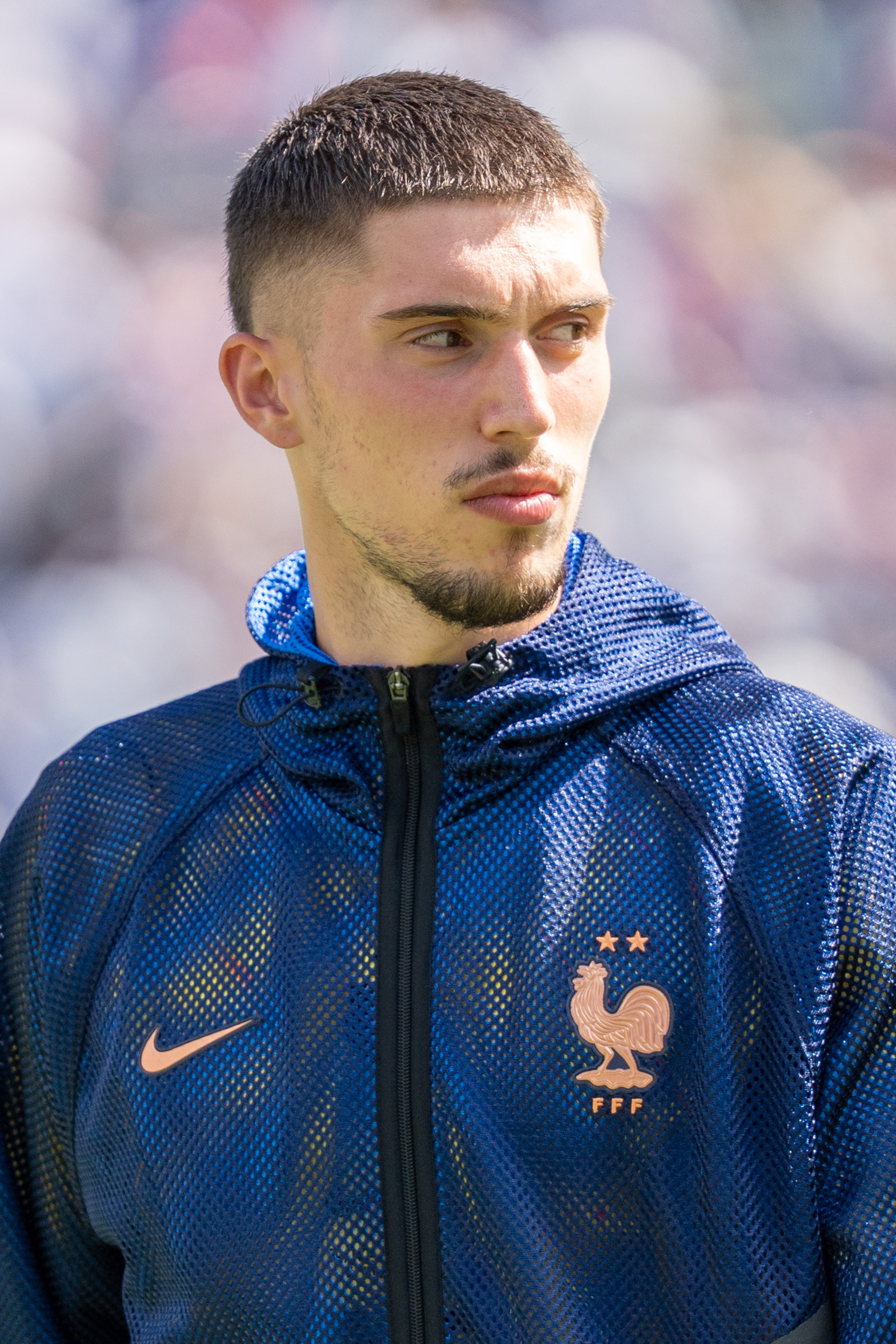
- Risser with France in 2026

Personal information
- Full name: Robin François Philippe Risser
- Date of birth: 2 December 2004 (age 21)
- Place of birth: Colmar, France
- Height: 1.93 m (6 ft 4 in)
- Position: Goalkeeper

Team information
- Current team: Lens
- Number: 40

Youth career
- 2010–2015: FC Bennwihr
- 2015–2017: Colmar
- 2017–2022: Strasbourg

Senior career*
Years	Team	Apps	(Gls)
2022–2025	Strasbourg	0	(0)
2022–2023	→ Strasbourg B	10	(0)
2023–2024	→ Dijon (loan)	30	(0)
2024–2025	→ Red Star (loan)	19	(0)
2025–	Lens	44	(0)

International career
2019–2020	France U16	3	(0)
2021–2022	France U18	3	(0)
2022–2023	France U19	6	(0)
2024	France U20	1	(0)
2025–2026	France U21	5	(0)
- * Club domestic league appearances and goals as of 21 November 2026

Robin François Philippe Risser (French pronunciation: [ʁɔbɛ᷉ ʁisɛχ]; born 2 December 2004) is a French professional footballer who plays as a goalkeeper for Ligue 1 club Lens.

== Early career ==
Born in Colmar, Risser began his youth career at FC Bennwihr. He moved to SR Colmar in 2015 before joining Strasbourg in 2017.

== Club career ==
=== Strasbourg ===
Risser was promoted to the first team of Strasbourg for the 2022–23 Ligue 2 season, being the third choice goalkeeper.

=== Dijon ===
On 7 July 2023, Risser joined Championnat National side Dijon in a one-season loan deal. He was chosen to be the first choice keeper of the team for the entire season. On 11 August 2023, he made his debut in the first league match of the season, keeping a clean sheet in a goalless draw against Rouen.

=== Red Star ===
On 28 November 2024, Risser joins Ligue 2 club Red Star on loan.

=== Lens ===
On 4 July 2025, Risser was transferred to Ligue 1 team Lens, signing a contract with the team until June 2030. As Lens' starter goalkeeper, Risser played an important role helping the team finish second in the 2025–26 Ligue 1. As the result, he was given the Goalkeeper of the Year award by UNFP and featured in Ligue 1 Team of the Year.

== International career ==
Risser represented France in several youth categories, including France U16, France U18 and France U19. In August 2023, he received his first call up with the France national under-21s. On 26 June 2024, he withdrew from the French squad for the 2024 Summer Olympics due to an elbow injury and was replaced by Théo De Percin.

On 14 May 2026, Risser received his first call-up to the France national team, being named in the 26-men squad for the 2026 FIFA World Cup.

== Career statistics ==
As of match played 21 November 2026

Appearances and goals by club, season and competition
Club	Season	League			Coupe de France		Europe		Other		Total	
Club	Season	Division	Apps	Goals	Apps	Goals	Apps	Goals	Apps	Goals	Apps	Goals
Strasbourg B	2021–22	CFA 2	3	0	—		—		—		3	0
Strasbourg B	2022–23	CFA 2	6	0	—		—		—		6	0
Strasbourg B	2024–25	CFA 2	1	0	—		—		—		1	0
Strasbourg B	Total		10	0	—		—		—		10	0
Dijon (loan)	2023–24	Ligue 3	30	0	0	0	—		—		30	0
Red Star (loan)	2024–25	Ligue 2	19	0	0	0	—		—		19	0
Lens	2025–26	Ligue 1	33	0	5	0	—		—		38	0
Lens	2026–27	Ligue 1	11	0	0	0	4 (Note: Appearances in UEFA Champions League)	0	1 (Note: Appearance in Trophée des Champions)	0	16	0
Lens	Total		44	0	5	0	4	0	1	0	54	0
Career total			103	0	5	0	4	0	1	0	113	0

== Honours ==
Lens

- Coupe de France: 2025–26
- Trophée des Champions: 2026

Individual

- UNFP Ligue 1 Goalkeeper of the Year: 2025–26
- UNFP Ligue 1 Team of the Year: 2025–26
