= Bartosz Żelazowski =

Polish footballer (born 2005)

Personal information
- Date of birth: 25 April 2005 (age 21)
- Place of birth: Warsaw, Poland
- Height: 1.93 m (6 ft 4 in)
- Position: Goalkeeper

Team information
- Current team: Dunav Ruse
- Number: 1

Youth career
- –2021: Escola Varsovia
- 2022–2024: Nice

Senior career*
Years	Team	Apps	(Gls)
2022–2023	Nice B	4	(0)
2024–2026	Nice	0	(0)
2026–	Dunav Ruse	1	(0)
- * Club domestic league appearances and goals as of 20:11, 11 October 2026 (UTC)

Bartosz Żelazowski (born 25 April 2005) is a Polish professional footballer who plays as a goalkeeper for Bulgarian First League club Dunav Ruse.

== Early life ==
Żelazowski was born on 25 April 2005. Born in Warsaw, Poland, he is the son of Cezary. Growing up, he regarded Poland internationals Wojciech Szczęsny and Łukasz Fabiański as his football idols.

== Career ==
As a youth player, Żelazowski joined the youth academy of Polish side Escola Varsovia. Following his stint there, he joined the youth academy of French Ligue 1 side Nice during January 2022 and was promoted to the club's senior team ahead of the 2025–26 season. He left Nice in June 2026 upon the expiration of his contract, without making a first-team appearance.

On 7 October 2026, Żelazowski signed with Bulgarian side Dunav Ruse until June 2028. He made his debut in a league match against Septemvri Sofia on 11 October, replacing Georgi Kitanov in the 41st minute. After saving a penalty kick from Pedro Igor in the 56th minute, Dunav went on to score thrice to secure a 3–2 comeback win.

== Career statistics ==
As of match played 11 October 2026

Appearances and goals by club, season and competition
Club	Season	League			National cup (Note: Includes Coupe de France)		Europe		Other		Total	
Club	Season	Division	Apps	Goals	Apps	Goals	Apps	Goals	Apps	Goals	Apps	Goals
Nice B	2022–23	National 3	4	0	—		—		—		4	0
Nice	2024–25	Ligue 1	0	0	0	0	0	0	—		0	0
Nice	2025–26	Ligue 1	0	0	0	0	0	0	—		0	0
Nice	Total		0	0	0	0	0	0	—		0	0
Dunav Ruse	2026–27	Bulgarian First League	1	0	0	0	—		—		1	0
Career total			5	0	0	0	0	0	0	0	5	0

== Honours ==
Nice

- Coupe de France runner-up: 2025–26
