= Nuno Mendes =

Nuno Mendes may refer to:

- Nuno Mendes (count) (died 1071), count of Portugal
- Nuno Mendes (chef) (born 1973), Portuguese chef
- Nuno Mendes (footballer, born 1978), Portuguese midfielder
- Nuno Mendes (rower) (born 1984), Portuguese rower
- Nuno Mendes (footballer, born 2002), Portuguese football left-back
