= Abdallah Sima =

Senegalese association football player (born 2001)

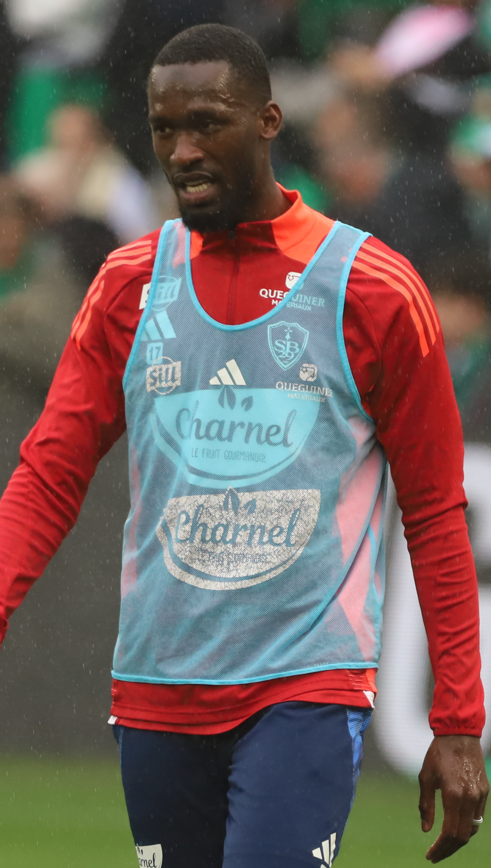
- Sima warming up for Brest in 2025

Personal information
- Full name: Abdallah Dipo Sima
- Date of birth: 17 June 2001 (age 25)
- Place of birth: Dakar, Senegal
- Height: 1.88 m (6 ft 2 in)
- Position: Forward

Team information
- Current team: Lens
- Number: 19

Youth career
- Medina
- Thonon Évian
- 2020: MAS Táborsko

Senior career*
Years	Team	Apps	(Gls)
2020–2021	Slavia Prague	24	(11)
2021–2025	Brighton & Hove Albion	0	(0)
2021–2022	→ Stoke City (loan)	2	(0)
2022–2023	→ Angers (loan)	34	(5)
2023–2024	→ Rangers (loan)	25	(11)
2024–2025	→ Brest (loan)	27	(7)
2025–	Lens	26	(3)

International career^{‡}
2021–	Senegal	12	(0)
- * Club domestic league appearances and goals as of 19:13, 18 September 2026 (UTC) ‡ National team caps and goals as of 22:14, 29 September 2026 (UTC)

Abdallah Dipo Sima (born 17 June 2001) is a Senegalese professional footballer who plays as a forward for Ligue 1 club Lens and the Senegal national team.

== Club career ==
=== Early career ===
Sima was spotted by French club Thonon Évian whilst playing in Senegal for amateur club Medina. In 2020, Sima moved to Czech club MAS Táborsko under the advice of agent Daniel Chrysostome. Sima first came to the attention of Slavia Prague after scoring for Táborsko in a friendly against Viktoria Žižkov. Slavia Prague began negotiations for the transfer of Sima, who had only been at Táborsko for six months, after he scored twice against Slavia Prague B in a friendly.

=== Slavia Prague ===
On 23 July 2020, Slavia Prague announced the signing of Sima to initially play for the club's B team. After scoring four goals in six games for the B team in the Bohemian Football League, Sima was promoted to the first team, making his debut against 1. FC Slovácko on 26 September 2020. On 5 November 2020, Sima scored his first goal for the club in a 3–2 UEFA Europa League win against Nice. On 20 May 2021, Sima scored the only goal in a 1–0 Czech Cup final win against Viktoria Plzeň. In his first season at the club, Sima scored 11 Czech First League goals, one in the Czech Cup and four in the Europa League, resulting in a tally of 16 goals in 33 appearances in all competitions for Slavia Prague.

=== Brighton & Hove Albion ===
On 31 August 2021, Sima joined Premier League side Brighton & Hove Albion for an undisclosed fee on a four-year deal.

On 9 June 2025, Sima extended his contract with Brighton until 30 June 2026.

==== Stoke City (loan) ====
Upon moving to England to join Brighton, Sima was immediately loaned out to Championship side Stoke City for the duration of the 2021–22 season. He made his debut for the club on 15 September 2021, coming on as a 76th minute substitute, replacing Jacob Brown in the 1–1 home draw with Barnsley. Sima was assessed in December with the possibility of returning to his parent club Brighton due to injury setbacks, only making four appearances in all competitions for The Potters.

==== Angers (loan) ====
On 13 July 2022, Sima joined Ligue 1 club Angers on a season-long loan.

==== Rangers (loan) ====
On 29 June 2023, Sima joined Scottish Premiership club Rangers on a season-long loan. He made his debut for the club on 5 August 2023, starting in a 1–0 away defeat to Kilmarnock. He scored his first goal for Rangers during a league match at home to Livingston on 12 August 2023.

==== Brest (loan) ====
On 21 August 2024, Sima joined Ligue 1 side Brest on a season-long loan.

=== Lens ===
On 29 August 2025, Sima joined Ligue 1 club Lens on a permanent deal, signing a contract until 2029.

== International career ==
Sima made his debut for the Senegal national team on 26 March 2021, in a 2021 Africa Cup of Nations qualifier against Congo.

In December 2023, he was named in Senegal's squad for the postponed 2023 Africa Cup of Nations held in the Ivory Coast.

== Career statistics ==
=== Club ===
As of match played 18 September 2026

Appearances and goals by club, season and competition
Club	Season	League			National cup (Note: Includes Czech Cup, Coupe de France, Scottish Cup)		League cup (Note: Includes EFL Cup, Scottish League Cup)		Europe		Other		Total	
Club	Season	Division	Apps	Goals	Apps	Goals	Apps	Goals	Apps	Goals	Apps	Goals	Apps	Goals
Slavia Prague	2020–21	Czech First League	21	11	1	1	—		11 (Note: Appearances in UEFA Europa League)	4	—		33	16
Slavia Prague	2021–22	Czech First League	3	0	0	0	—		3 (Note: One appearance in UEFA Champions League, two appearances in UEFA Europa League)	0	—		6	0
Slavia Prague	Total		24	11	1	1	—		14	4	—		39	16
Brighton & Hove Albion	2021–22	Premier League	0	0	0	0	0	0	—		—		0	0
Stoke City (loan)	2021–22	Championship	2	0	0	0	2	0	—		—		4	0
Angers (loan)	2022–23	Ligue 1	34	5	3	1	—		—		—		37	6
Rangers (loan)	2023–24	Scottish Premiership	25	11	2	0	4	1	9 (Note: Three appearances and one goal in UEFA Champions League, six appearances and three goals in UEFA Europa League)	4	—		40	16
Brest (loan)	2024–25	Ligue 1	27	7	4	2	—		9 (Note: Appearances in UEFA Champions League)	3	—		40	12
Lens	2025–26	Ligue 1	21	2	6	5	—		—		—		27	7
Lens	2026–27	Ligue 1	5	1	0	0	—		1	1	1 (Note: Appearance in Trophée des Champions)	0	7	2
Lens	Total		26	3	6	5	—		1	1	1	0	34	9
Career total			138	37	16	9	6	1	32	11	1	0	193	58

=== International ===
As of match played 29 September 2026

Appearances and goals by national team and year
National team	Year	Apps	Goals
Senegal	2021	4	0
Senegal	2024	4	0
Senegal	2025	2	0
Senegal	2026	2	0
Total		12	0

== Honours ==
Slavia Prague

- Czech First League: 2020–21
- Czech Cup: 2020–21

Rangers

- Scottish League Cup: 2023–24

Lens

- Coupe de France: 2025–26
- Trophée des Champions: 2026

Individual

- Czech First League Young Player of the Year: 2020–21
- Czech First League Player of the Month: December 2021
- Scottish Premiership Player of the Month: October 2023
