= Andrija Bulatović =

Montenegrin footballer (born 2006)

Personal information
- Date of birth: 27 December 2006 (age 19)
- Place of birth: Bijelo Polje, Montenegro
- Height: 1.80 m (5 ft 11 in)
- Position: Midfielder

Team information
- Current team: Lens
- Number: 5

Youth career
- Berane
- Kom

Senior career*
Years	Team	Apps	(Gls)
2022–2023	Kom	4	(1)
2024	Rudar Pljevlja	34	(2)
2024–2025	Budućnost Podgorica	18	(2)
2025–	Lens	24	(0)
2025	→ Budućnost Podgorica (loan)	14	(4)

International career^{‡}
2022–2023	Montenegro U17	5	(0)
2023–2024	Montenegro U19	8	(1)
2024–	Montenegro U21	3	(0)
2025–	Montenegro	13	(1)
- * Club domestic league appearances and goals as of 30 October 2026 ‡ National team caps and goals as of 13 November 2026

Andrija Bulatović (born 27 December 2006) is a Montenegrin professional footballer who plays as a midfielder for Ligue 1 club Lens and the Montenegro national team.

== Club career ==
Prior to joining FK Budućnost Podgorica on 1 July 2024, Bulatović played for FK Berane, FK Kom and FK Rudar Pljevlja. He scored his first league goal for Budućnost Podgorica in a 3-0 victory against Otrant in November 2024 at the age of 17. Bulatović had scored his first goals in the Montenegrin First League at the age of 16 for Rudar Pljevlja. He made his debut in the UEFA Conference League for Budućnost in July 2024 away against KF Malisheva of Kosovo in a 1-0 defeat.

On 3 February 2025, Bulatović signed a three-and-a-half-year contract with Lens in France, and returned to Budućnost on loan until the end of the 2024–25 season. It was reported that interest had also come in from Dinamo Zagreb, and Lens had to pay around €2 million for his services.

== International career ==
Bulatović has represented Montenegro at various youth levels of football. He his first goal for the Montenegro national under-19 football team in November 2024 in a 3–0 victory against Greece U19. He was a key member of the Montenegro U19 side that qualified for the 2025 UEFA European Under-19 Championship in Romania.

Bulatović made his debut for the Montenegro U21 team against Romania U21 in September 2024. On 10 June 2025, alongside Vasilije Adžić, Bulatović debuted and scored his first goal for the Montenegro senior squad in a 2–2 home draw against Armenia.

== Style of play ==
A central midfielder, his play is characterised by sharp passing ability and ball control, with a good sense of positioning, which aids his tactical ability.

== Personal life ==
Bulatović is from Kolašin in Montenegro.

== Cacreer statistics ==
=== Club ===
As of match played 30 October 2026

Appearances and goals by club, season and competition
Club	Season	League			National cup		Europe		Other		Total	
Club	Season	Division	Apps	Goals	Apps	Goals	Apps	Goals	Apps	Goals	Apps	Goals
Kom	2022–23	Montenegrin Second League	4	0	—		—		2 (Note: Appearances in Montenegrin Second League promotion play-offs)	0	6	0
Rudar Pljevlja	2023–24	Montenegrin First League	34	2	4	0	—		—		38	2
Budućnost Podgorica	2024–25	Montenegrin First League	32	5	2	0	4 (Note: Appearances in UEFA Conference League)	0	—		38	5
Lens	2025–26	Ligue 1	16	0	3	2	—		—		19	2
Lens	2026–27	Ligue 1	8	0	0	0	1 (Note: Appearance in UEFA Champions League)	0	1 (Note: Appearance in Trophée des Champions)	0	10	0
Lens	Total		24	0	3	2	1	0	1	0	29	2
Career total			94	7	9	2	5	0	3	0	111	9

=== International ===
As of match played 12 November 2026

Appearances and goals by national team and year
National team	Year	Apps	Goals
Montenegro	2025	6	1
Montenegro	2026	7	0
Total		13	1

Scores and results list Montenegro goal tally first, score column indicates score after each Bulatović goal.

List of international goals scored by Andrija Bulatović
No.	Date	Venue	Cap	Opponent	Score	Result	Competition
1	9 June 2025	Gradski stadion, Nikšić, Montenegro	1	Armenia	2–1	2–2	Friendly

== Honours ==
Lens

- Coupe de France: 2025–26
- Trophée des Champions: 2026
