= Pierre Sage =

French football coach (born 1979)

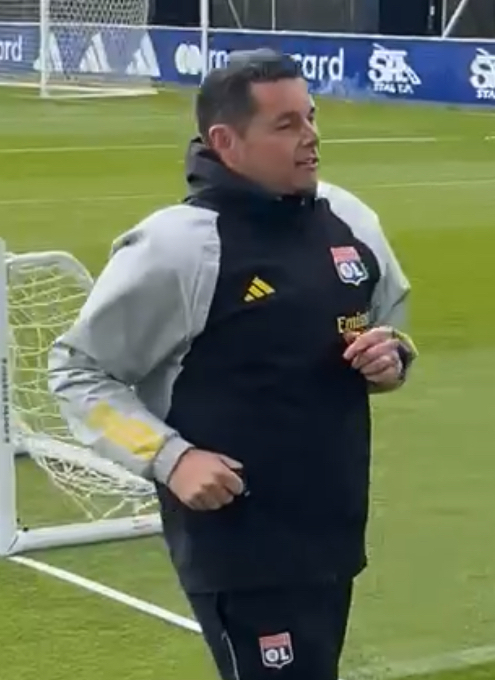
- Sage in 2024

Personal information
- Full name: Pierre Sage
- Date of birth: 5 May 1979 (age 47)
- Place of birth: Lons-le-Saunier, Jura, France

Youth career
- 1985–1997: CS Belley

Senior career*
Years	Team	Apps	(Gls)
1997–2003	CS Belley		
2003–2005	Oyonnax Plastics Vallée		

Managerial career
- 2013: Chambéry
- 2023–2025: Lyon
- 2025–2026: Lens
- 2026: Crystal Palace
- * Club domestic league appearances and goals

Pierre Sage (French pronunciation: [pjɛʁ saʒ]; born 5 May 1979) is a French professional football manager and former player who was most recently the manager of Premier League club Crystal Palace. He has previously managed French clubs Lyon and Lens.

== Early life ==
Pierre Sage was born on 5 May 1979 in Lons-le-Saunier, Jura.

== Managerial career ==
=== Early career ===
Sage spent his entire footballing career with CS Belley as an amateur footballer from the age of 6 to 24, and started educating with them at the age of 16. At the age of 24 he moved to Oyonnax Plastics Vallée where he started as a technical manager. In 2003, he moved to Châteauroux to work as a scout for a season. In 2004, he worked as a technical director of PL Vallée, before moving to FBBP01 as a team manager in 2007. His first stint as a senior manager was with Chambéry in 2013. He returned to team management under Sedan in 2016, before going to Lyon-Duchère in 2018 as assistant manager.

=== Lyon ===
In 2019, he had his first stint as a youth coach with Lyon, before moving to Red Star as an assistant manager. In July 2023, he returned to Lyon as the manager of their academy. On 30 November 2023, he was appointed as the interim manager of Lyon after Fabio Grosso was sacked. On 11 January 2024, he was confirmed as manager of Lyon until the end of the season, where they qualified for the UEFA Europa League. Later that year, on 3 July, he signed a new contract with Lyon until 2026. He was sacked on 27 January 2025 after a series of bad results.

=== Lens ===
On 2 June 2025, Sage signed with Ligue 1 side Lens on a three-year deal. In his first season with the club, he led them to reach the Coupe de France final, their first appearance in the final since 1998. He also secured a second-place finish to qualify for the UEFA Champions League. On 22 May 2026, Sage guided Lens to their first ever Coupe de France title, with a 3–1 victory over Nice at the Stade de France.

=== Crystal Palace ===
On the back of his success at Lens, Sage was appointed manager of Premier League team Crystal Palace in June 2026 on a three-year contract. After 10 league matches, with Palace bottom of the league, Sage was sacked on 12 November.

== Managerial statistics ==
As of match played 8 November 2026

Managerial record by team and tenure
Team	From	To	Record							
Team	From	To	G	W	D	L	GF	GA	GD	Win %
Chambéry	21 February 2013	30 June 2013	13	7	3	3	18	11	+7	53.85
Lyon	30 November 2023	27 January 2025	56	32	11	13	100	71	+29	57.14
Lens	2 June 2025	15 June 2026	40	27	5	8	85	42	+43	67.50
Crystal Palace	15 June 2026	12 November 2026	16	5	3	8	23	30	−7	31.25
Total			123	69	22	32	219	152	+67	56.10

== Honours ==
Lyon

- Coupe de France runner-up: 2023–24

Lens

- Coupe de France: 2025–26

Individual

- UNFP Ligue 1 Manager of the Year: 2025–26
