= 2018–19 RC Strasbourg Alsace season =

Strasbourg
2018–19 season
- Chairman: Marc Keller
- Manager: Thierry Laurey
- Stadium: Stade de la Meinau
- Ligue 1: 11th
- Coupe de France: Round of 32
- Coupe de la Ligue: Winners
- Top goalscorer: League: Lebo Mothiba (10); All: Lebo Mothiba (12)
- Highest home attendance: League/All: 25,962 (3 May 2019 v. Marseille)
- Lowest home attendance: League: 24,683 (22 September 2018 v. Amiens); All: 16,821 (30 October 2018 v. Lille, CdlL Ro32)
- Average home league attendance: 25,213
- Biggest win: 5–1 (at Monaco, 19 January 2019)
- Biggest defeat: 0–2 (at Lyon, 24 August 2018)
Home colours	Away colours	Third colours

The 2018–19 Ligue 1 season was Racing Club de Strasbourg Alsace's second season since its return to the top flight of French football.

== Players ==
=== Current squad ===
As of 30 August 2018.

Note: Flags indicate national team as defined under FIFA eligibility rules; some limited exceptions apply. Players may hold more than one non-FIFA nationality.

No.	Pos.	Nation	Player
1	GK	BEL	Matz Sels
3	DF	SEN	Abdallah N'Dour
4	DF	FRA	Pablo Martinez
5	DF	CIV	Lamine Koné (on loan from Sunderland)
6	MF	FRA	Jérémy Grimm
7	MF	TUN	Moataz Zemzemi
8	MF	FRA	Jonas Martin
9	FW	ALG	Idriss Saadi
10	MF	FRA	Benjamin Corgnet
11	MF	FRA	Dimitri Liénard
12	FW	RSA	Lebo Mothiba
13	DF	SRB	Stefan Mitrović (captain)
16	GK	JPN	Eiji Kawashima

No.	Pos.	Nation	Player
17	MF	FRA	Anthony Gonçalves
18	MF	FRA	Ibrahima Sissoko
23	DF	FRA	Lionel Carole
25	FW	FRA	Ludovic Ajorque
26	MF	FRA	Adrien Thomasson
27	DF	FRA	Kenny Lala
29	FW	CPV	Nuno da Costa
30	GK	FRA	Bingourou Kamara
31	MF	FRA	Anthony Caci
32	DF	CMR	Duplexe Tchamba
33	DF	FRA	Ismaël Aaneba
34	FW	MLI	Kévin Lucien Zohi
36	MF	FRA	Youssouf Fofana

=== Out on loan ===
Note: Flags indicate national team as defined under FIFA eligibility rules; some limited exceptions apply. Players may hold more than one non-FIFA nationality.

No.	Pos.	Nation	Player
—	DF	GUF	Yoann Salmier (on loan at Troyes)

== Competitions ==
=== Ligue 1 ===
==== League table ====
Pos	Team	Pld	W	D	L	GF	GA	GD	Pts	Qualification or relegation
9	Nîmes	38	15	8	15	57	58	−1	53	
10	Rennes	38	13	13	12	55	52	+3	52	Qualification to Europa League group stage (Note: Rennes qualified for the Europa League group stage by winning the 2018–19 Coupe de France.)
11	Strasbourg	38	11	16	11	58	48	+10	49	Qualification to Europa League second qualifying round (Note: Strasbourg qualified for the Europa League second qualifying round by winning the 2018–19 Coupe de la Ligue.)
12	Nantes	38	13	9	16	48	48	0	48	
13	Angers	38	10	16	12	44	49	−5	46	

Source: Ligue 1 and Soccerway
Rules for classification: 1) Points; 2) Goal difference; 3) Head-to-head points; 4) Head-to-head goal difference; 5) Head-to-head goals scored; 6) Head-to-head away goals scored; 7) Goals scored; 8) Away goals scored; 9) Most goals scored in single league match; 10) Fairplay ranking.

==== Results summary ====
Overall								Home						Away					
Pld	W	D	L	GF	GA	GD	Pts	W	D	L	GF	GA	GD	W	D	L	GF	GA	GD
38	11	16	11	58	48	+10	49	6	8	5	31	25	+6	5	8	6	27	23	+4

Last updated: 24 May 2019.
Source: Matches

==== Results by round ====
Round	1	2	3	4	5	6	7	8	9	10	11	12	13	14	15	16	17	18	19	20	21	22	23	24	25	26	27	28	29	30	31	32	33	34	35	36	37	38
Ground	A	H	A	H	A	H	A	H	A	H	A	H	A	H	A	H	H	A	H	A	A	H	A	H	A	H	A	H	A	H	A	H	H	A	H	A	H	A
Result	W	D	L	L	D	W	L	W	D	W	D	D	D	L	W	D	D	L	W	W	W	W	L	L	D	D	L	D	D	W	D	D	L	D	D	L	L	W
Position	5	6	11	15	16	9	13	8	9	7	7	7	8	9	8	9	8	9	7	6	5	5	6	9	9	9	9	10	11	9	9	9	10	10	10	11	12	11

Source: Matches
A = Away; H = Home; W = Win; D = Draw; L = Loss

==== Matches ====
Win Draw Loss

12 August 2018 1	Bordeaux	0–2	Strasbourg	Bordeaux
17:00 CEST (UTC+2)	Pablo (red card) 13'; Baysse (yellow card) 74'	Report	Sissoko 68' da Costa 78'	Stadium: Matmut Atlantique; Attendance: 23,079; Referee: Hakim Ben el Hadj

19 August 2018 2	Strasbourg	1–1	Saint-Étienne	Strasbourg
15:00 CEST (UTC+2)	Stefan Mitrović 5'; Gonçalves (yellow card) 55'	Report	Subotić (red card) 18'; M'Vila (yellow card) 77'; Khazri (yellow card) 80'; Gueye 88'	Stadium: Stade de la Meinau; Attendance: 25,385; Referee: Benoît Millot

24 August 2018 3	Lyon	2–0	Strasbourg	Décines-Charpieu
20:45 CEST (UTC+2)	Mendy (yellow card) 10'; Terrier 42'; Traoré 64'	Report	Sissoko (yellow card) 15'; Thomasson (yellow card) 45'	Stadium: Parc Olympique Lyonnais; Attendance: 47,341; Referee: Amaury Delerue

1 September 2018 4	Strasbourg	2–3	Nantes	Strasbourg
20:00 CEST (UTC+2)	Ajorque 21'; Martin (yellow card) 57' da Costa 81'	Report	Stefan Mitrović 34' (o.g.); Lucas Lima (yellow card) 43'; Evangelista 45+2'; Kwateng (yellow card) 57'; Sala 59'	Stadium: Stade de la Meinau; Attendance: 25,031; Referee: Olivier Thual

15 September 2018 5	Montpellier	1–1	Strasbourg	Montpellier
20:00 CEST (UTC+2)	Le Tallec 51'; Oyongo (yellow card) 59'	Report	Martin (yellow card) 28'; Pablo Martinez (yellow card) 87'; Mothiba 90+3'	Stadium: Stade de la Mosson; Attendance: 10,630; Referee: Willy Delajod

22 September 2018 6	Strasbourg	3–1	Amiens	Strasbourg
20:00 CEST (UTC+2)	Lala 48'; Corgnet (yellow card) 63'; Corgnet 66'; Adénon 86' (o.g.)	Report	Ghoddos (yellow card) 28'; Krafth 45+2', (yellow card) 82'; Adénon (yellow card) 47'; Monconduit (yellow card) 71'	Stadium: Stade de la Meinau; Attendance: 24,683; Referee: Jérémy Stinat

26 September 2018 7	Marseille	3–2	Strasbourg	Marseille
19:00 CEST (UTC+2)	Payet 41' (pen.); Sanson 44', (yellow card) 59'; Thauvin (yellow card) 50'; Amavi (red card) 52'; Luiz Gustavo (yellow card) 60'; Germain 90+1'	Report	Lala 27'; Thomasson (yellow card) 33'; Carole (yellow card) 49'; Grimm (yellow card) 79'; Da Costa 89'	Stadium: Stade Vélodrome; Attendance: 47,099; Referee: François Letexier

29 September 2018 8	Strasbourg	3–0	Dijon	Strasbourg
20:00 CEST (UTC+2)	Da Costa 13'; Martin (yellow card) 32', (goal) 90+2'; Mothiba 81'	Report	Keita (yellow card) 22'; Yambéré (yellow card) 31'; Lautoa (yellow card) 63'	Stadium: Stade de la Meinau; Attendance: 25,060; Referee: Eric Wattellier

6 October 2018 9	Angers	2–2	Strasbourg	Angers
20:00 CEST (UTC+2)	Reine-Adélaïde (yellow card) 61'; Capelle 58'; Thomas 90+3'	Report	Mothiba 2', 40'; Pablo Martinez (yellow card) 45'; Stefan Mitrović (yellow card) 49'; Martin (yellow card) 61'; Sels (yellow card) 76'; Grimm (yellow card) 88'	Stadium: Stade Raymond Kopa; Attendance: 8,930; Referee: Johan Hamel

20 October 2018 10	Strasbourg	2–1	Monaco	Strasbourg
20:00 CEST (UTC+2)	Mitrović (yellow card) 15'; Thomasson 17'; Mothiba 84'; Sissoko (yellow card) 87'	Report	Aholou (yellow card) 46'; Chadli (yellow card) 55'; Grandsir (red card) 66'; Tielemans 90+1' (pen.), (yellow card) 90+4'	Stadium: Stade de la Meinau; Attendance: 25,358; Referee: Nicolas Rainville

27 October 2018 11	Guingamp	1–1	Strasbourg	Guingamp
20:00 CEST (UTC+2)	Benezet 6'; Fofana (yellow card) 71'	Report	da Costa (yellow card) 49'; Zohi 88'	Stadium: Stade de Roudourou; Attendance: 13,643; Referee: Willy Delajod

3 November 2018 12	Strasbourg	1–1	Toulouse	Strasbourg
20:00 CET (UTC+1)	Sissoko (yellow card) 20'; Mothiba 51'; Lala (yellow card) 74'; Stefan Mitrović (yellow card) 90+5'	Report	García (yellow card) 48'; Gradel 72'	Stadium: Stade de la Meinau; Attendance: 25,034; Referee: Jérôme Miguelgorry

9 November 2018 13	Lille	0–0	Strasbourg	Villeneuve-d'Ascq
20:45 CET (UTC+1)		Report	Aaneba (yellow card) 68'; Mothiba (yellow card) 83'	Stadium: Stade Pierre-Mauroy; Attendance: 27,544; Referee: Olivier Thual

24 November 2018 14	Strasbourg	0–1	Nîmes	Strasbourg
20:00 CET (UTC+1)	Aaneba (yellow card) 53'; Martin (yellow card) 77'; Mitrović (red card) 80'; Liénard (yellow card) 82'	Report	Lybohy 70'; Ferri (yellow card) 82'	Stadium: Stade de la Meinau; Attendance: 25,128; Referee: Benoît Millot

2 December 2018 15	Rennes	1–4	Strasbourg	Rennes
17:00 CET (UTC+1)	Sarr 9'; Bensebaini (yellow card) 26'; Da Silva (yellow card) 30'; Mexer (yellow card) 50'	Report	Sissoko (yellow card) 15'; Thomasson 20'; Martin 32' (pen.), 51' (pen.); Martinez 77'	Stadium: Roazhon Park; Attendance: 19,867; Referee: Eric Wattellier

5 December 2018 16	Strasbourg	1–1	Paris Saint-Germain	Strasbourg
21:00 CET (UTC+1)	Lala 40' (pen.); Martinez (yellow card) 61'; Thomasson (yellow card) 75'	Report	Draxler (yellow card) 30'; Cavani 71' (pen.); Dani Alves (yellow card) 75'; Verratti (yellow card) 88'	Stadium: Stade de la Meinau; Attendance: 25,702; Referee: Antony Gautier

9 December 2018 17	Strasbourg	2–2	Caen	Strasbourg
15:00 CET (UTC+1)	Martinez 5'; Mothiba 23'; Sissoko (yellow card) 85'	Report	Fajr 22'; Khaoui 80'; Zahary (yellow card) 90+2'	Stadium: Stade de la Meinau; Attendance: 25,048; Referee: Olivier Thual

15 December 2018 18	Reims	2–1	Strasbourg	Reims
19:00 CET (UTC+1)	Doumbia 6'; Cafaro 66'; Romao (yellow card) 71'	Report	Thomasson 49'; Mitrović (yellow card) 76'	Stadium: Stade Auguste Delaune; Attendance: 12,171; Referee: Florent Batta

22 December 2018 19	Strasbourg	2–0	Nice	Strasbourg
15:00 CET (UTC+1)	Mitrović (yellow card) 3'; Thomasson 26'; Koné 41'; Mothiba (yellow card) 43'	Report		Stadium: Stade de la Meinau; Attendance: 25,113; Referee: Willy Delajod

13 January 2019 20	Toulouse	1–2	Strasbourg	Toulouse
17:00 CET (UTC+1)	Sanogo 29' (pen.); Bostock (yellow card) 45+3'	Report	Ajorque 17'; Martin (yellow card) 36'; Sissoko 64'	Stadium: Stadium Municipal; Attendance: 15,465; Referee: Hakim Ben El Hadj

19 January 2019 21	Monaco	1–5	Strasbourg	Monaco
20:00 CET (UTC+1)	Naldo (red card) 7'; Glik (yellow card) 8'; Falcao 22', (yellow card) 77'; B. Badiashile (yellow card) 37'; Fàbregas (yellow card) 72'	Report	Ajorque 12', 68'; Thomasson 17'; Martin (yellow card) 29'; Mitrović (yellow card) 36' (red card) 69'; Sissoko 63'; Fofana 90+4'	Stadium: Stade Louis II; Attendance: 7,298; Referee: François Letexier

26 January 2019 22	Strasbourg	1–0	Bordeaux	Strasbourg
20:00 CET (UTC+1)	Koné (yellow card) 82'; Martinez (yellow card) 84'; Lala 90+3'	Report	Jovanović (yellow card) 49'; Briand (yellow card) 88'	Stadium: Stade de la Meinau; Attendance: 25,214; Referee: Florent Batta

3 February 2019 23	Saint-Étienne	Postponed	Strasbourg	Saint-Étienne
17:00 CET (UTC+1)		Report		Stadium: Stade Geoffroy-Guichard

9 February 2019 24	Strasbourg	1–2	Angers	Strasbourg
20:00 CET (UTC+1)	Mitrović (yellow card) 45+1'; Prcić 87'; Lala (yellow card) 90'	Report	Pavlović (yellow card) 17'; Kanga 35', 55'; Traoré (yellow card) 59'; Cristian (yellow card) 90+2'	Stadium: Stade de la Meinau; Attendance: 25,010; Referee: Amaury Delerue

13 February 2019 23	Saint-Étienne	2–1	Strasbourg	Saint-Étienne
19:00 CET (UTC+1)	Berić 4'; Perrin 27'	Report	Da Costa (yellow card) 14', (goal) 73'; Aaneba (yellow card) 39'; Thomasson (yellow card) 60'; Gonçalves (yellow card) 78'; Martinez (yellow card) 83'	Stadium: Stade Geoffroy-Guichard; Attendance: 16,406; Referee: Jérôme Brisard
Note: Rescheduled from 3 February 2019.

17 February 2019 25	Caen	0–0	Strasbourg	Caen
15:00 CET (UTC+1)		Report	Sissoko (yellow card) 38'; Martinez (yellow card) 45'; Ajorque (yellow card) 68'	Stadium: Stade Michel d'Ornano; Attendance: 14,290; Referee: Thomas Leonard

22 February 2019 26	Strasbourg	1–1	Lille	Strasbourg
20:45 CET (UTC+1)	Ajorque (yellow card) 40'; Gonçalves 68'	Report	Leão (yellow card) 37'; Ikoné 42'	Stadium: Stade de la Meinau; Attendance: 25,303; Referee: Clément Turpin

3 March 2019 27	Nice	1–0	Strasbourg	Nice
15:00 CET (UTC+1)	Atal 20'; Danilo (red card) 89'	Report	Grandsir (red card) 89'	Stadium: Allianz Riviera; Attendance: 17,479; Referee: Eric Wattellier

9 March 2019 28	Strasbourg	2–2	Lyon	Strasbourg
17:00 CET (UTC+1)	Ajorque 69', 70'; Martinez (yellow card) 80'	Report	Dembélé 3', 51' (pen.); Cornet (yellow card) 8'; Tousart (yellow card) 90+1'	Stadium: Stade de la Meinau; Attendance: 25,463; Referee: Jérôme Miguelgorry

16 March 2019 29	Nîmes	2–2	Strasbourg	Nîmes
20:00 CET (UTC+1)	Bouanga (yellow card) 55'; Valls (yellow card) 59'; Lybohy 67'; Ripart (yellow card) 68'; Savanier (yellow card) 85', (goal) 90+2' (pen.)	Report	Mothiba 9', (yellow card) 87'; Da Costa (yellow card) 14'; Carole (yellow card) 46'; Prcić (yellow card) 49'; Fofana 53'; Koné (yellow card) 90'; Lala (yellow card) 90'	Stadium: Stade des Costières; Attendance: 13,114; Referee: Amaury Delerue

3 April 2019 30	Strasbourg	4–0	Reims	Strasbourg
19:00 CEST (UTC+2)	Da Costa 45+2', 77' (pen.); Gonçalves 47', 70'; Thomasson (yellow card) 56' (yellow-red card) 88'	Report	Oudin (yellow card) 41'; Engels (yellow card) 83'; Cafaro (yellow card) 85'	Stadium: Stade de la Meinau; Attendance: 25,081; Referee: Jérémy Stinat

7 April 2019 31	Paris Saint-Germain	2–2	Strasbourg	Paris
21:00 CEST (UTC+2)	Choupo-Moting 13'; Kehrer 82'	Report	Da Costa 26'; Gonçalves 38'; Lala (yellow card) 57'; Sels (yellow card) 88'	Stadium: Parc des Princes; Attendance: 47,419; Referee: Thomas Leonard

13 April 2019 32	Strasbourg	3–3	Guingamp	Strasbourg
20:00 CEST (UTC+2)	Ajorque 39', 73'; Gonçalves (yellow card) 44'; Prcić 69'	Report	Thuram 37'; Deaux (yellow card) 41', (goal) 63'; Ndong (yellow card) 81'; Sorbon 86'	Stadium: Stade de la Meinau; Attendance: 25,190; Referee: Antony Gautier

20 April 2019 33	Strasbourg	1–3	Montpellier	Strasbourg
20:00 CEST (UTC+2)	Gonçalves (yellow card) 30'; Martinez 34'; Martin (yellow card) 83'	Report	Delort 22', 86'; Mollet 28'; Mendes (yellow card) 46'; Oyongo (yellow card) 52'	Stadium: Stade de la Meinau; Attendance: 25,192; Referee: François Letexier

28 April 2019 34	Amiens	0–0	Strasbourg	Amiens
15:00 CEST (UTC+2)	Timité (yellow card) 83'	Report	Ajorque (yellow card) 14'; Sissoko (yellow card) 29'; Martin (yellow card) 85'	Stadium: Stade de la Licorne; Attendance: 11,833; Referee: Stéphanie Frappart

3 May 2019 35	Strasbourg	1–1	Marseille	Strasbourg
20:45 CEST (UTC+2)	Lala 65'; Ajorque (yellow card) 89'	Report	Germain 48'; Strootman (yellow card) 51'; Rami (yellow card) 64'	Stadium: Stade de la Meinau; Attendance: 25,962; Referee: Jérôme Miguelgorry

11 May 2019 36	Dijon	2–1	Strasbourg	Dijon
20:00 CEST (UTC+2)	Balmont (yellow card) 14'; Tavares 40' (pen.); Kwon 90+4'	Report	Ajorque 68', (yellow card) 89'	Stadium: Stade Gaston Gérard; Attendance: 13,105; Referee: Hakim Ben El Hadj

18 May 2019 37	Strasbourg	0–2	Rennes	Strasbourg
21:00 CEST (UTC+2)	Caci (yellow card) 22'	Report	Bourigeaud 24'; Camavinga (yellow card) 45'; Koubek (yellow card) 83'; Hunou 90'	Stadium: Stade de la Meinau; Attendance: 25,086; Referee: Thomas Leonard

24 May 2019 38	Nantes	0–1	Strasbourg	Nantes
21:05 CEST (UTC+2)	Coulibaly (yellow card) 78'; Louza (yellow card) 87'	Report	Sissoko (yellow card) 28'; Mothiba 60' (pen.)	Stadium: Stade de la Beaujoire; Attendance: 30,636; Referee: Karim Abed

=== Coupe de France ===
16 January 2019 Round of 64	Grenoble	0–1 (a.e.t.)	Strasbourg	Grenoble
19:15 CET (UTC+1)	Sotoca (yellow card) 34'; Sanusi (yellow card) 71'; Abou Demba (yellow card) 120'	Report	Fofana (yellow card) 50'; Gonçalves (yellow card) 53'; Zohi 98'; Aaneba (yellow card) 104'	Stadium: Stade des Alpes; Attendance: 7,553; Referee: Thomas Léonard

23 January 2019 Round of 32	Paris Saint-Germain	2–0	Strasbourg	Paris
21:05 CET (UTC+1)	Cavani 4', (yellow card) 49'; Di María 80'; Kehrer (yellow card) 86'	Report	Aaneba (yellow card) 28'	Stadium: Parc des Princes; Attendance: 38,403; Referee: Johan Hamel

=== Coupe de la Ligue ===
30 October 2018 Round of 32	Strasbourg	2–0	Lille	Strasbourg
21:05 CET (UTC+1)	Fofana 13'; Grimm (yellow card) 16'; Liénard 81'	Report	Luiz Araújo (yellow card) 82'	Stadium: Stade de la Meinau; Attendance: 16,821; Referee: Hakim Ben El Hadj

19 December 2018 Round of 16	Marseille	1–1 (2–4 p)	Strasbourg	Marseille
21:05 CET (UTC+1)	Luiz Gustavo 80'; Payet (yellow card) 89'	Report	Martin 18' (pen.), (yellow card) 89'	Stadium: Stade Vélodrome; Attendance: 8,200; Referee: Ruddy Buquet
	Penalties
	Lopez (penalty scored); Payet (penalty missed); Luiz Gustavo (penalty scored); Rami (penalty missed)		(penalty scored) Liénard; (penalty scored) Thomasson; (penalty scored) Mothiba; (penalty scored) Martin

8 January 2019 Quarter-finals	Lyon	1–2	Strasbourg	Lyon
21:00 CET (UTC+1)	Traoré 49'	Report	Ajorque 26' (pen.); Caci (yellow card) 39'; Koné 52'; Thomasson (yellow card) 74'	Stadium: Parc Olympique Lyonnais; Attendance: 21,721; Referee: Clément Turpin

30 January 2019 Semi-finals	Strasbourg	3–2	Bordeaux	Strasbourg
18:45 CET (UTC+1)	Sissoko (yellow card) 45'; Ajorque 49'; Mothiba 55', 60'	Report	Sankharé 14'; Briand 82', (yellow card) 82'; Bašić (yellow card) 90'	Stadium: Stade de la Meinau; Attendance: 25,090; Referee: Antony Gautier

30 March 2019 Final	Strasbourg	0–0 (a.e.t.) (4–1 p)	Guingamp	Villeneuve-d'Ascq
21:05 CET (UTC+1)	Sissoko (yellow card) 69'; Thomasson (yellow card) 96'	Report	Phiri (yellow card) 24'; Benezet (yellow card) 70'	Stadium: Stade Pierre-Mauroy; Attendance: 49,161; Referee: Benoît Millot
	Penalties
	Prcić (penalty scored); Thomasson (penalty scored); Liénard (penalty scored); Carole (penalty scored)		(penalty missed) Mendy; (penalty scored) Didot; (penalty missed) Rodelin

== Statistics ==
=== Appearances and goals ===
No.	Pos	Nat	Player	Total		Ligue 1		Coupe de France		Coupe de la Ligue	
No.	Pos	Nat	Player	Apps	Goals	Apps	Goals	Apps	Goals	Apps	Goals
Goalkeepers
1	GK	(Belgium) BEL	Matz Sels	32	0	31	0	1	0	0	0
16	GK	(Japan) JPN	Eiji Kawashima	0	0	0	0	0	0	0	0
30	GK	(France) FRA	Bingourou Kamara	6	0	0	0	1	0	5	0
Defenders
3	DF	(Senegal) SEN	Abdallah Ndour	4	0	2	0	2	0	0	0
4	DF	(France) FRA	Pablo Martinez	35	2	29	2	1	0	5	0
5	DF	(Ivory Coast) CIV	Lamine Koné	27	2	20+2	1	0+1	0	4	1
13	DF	(Serbia) SRB	Stefan Mitrović	32	0	27	0	1	0	4	0
23	DF	(France) FRA	Lionel Carole	21	0	14+3	0	2	0	1+1	0
27	DF	(France) FRA	Kenny Lala	34	4	28	4	0+1	0	4+1	0
32	DF	(Cameroon) CMR	Duplexe Tchamba	1	0	0	0	0+1	0	0	0
33	DF	(France) FRA	Ismaël Aaneba	6	0	3	0	2	0	1	0
Midfielders
6	MF	(France) FRA	Jérémy Grimm	6	0	2+3	0	0	0	1	0
7	MF	(Tunisia) TUN	Moataz Zemzemi	4	0	0+2	0	2	0	0	0
8	MF	(France) FRA	Jonas Martin	23	4	20	3	0	0	2+1	1
10	MF	(France) FRA	Benjamin Corgnet	19	1	6+10	1	1	0	2	0
11	MF	(France) FRA	Dimitri Liénard	26	1	13+7	0	1+1	0	2+2	1
14	MF	(Bosnia and Herzegovina) BIH	Sanjin Prcić	10	1	8	1	0	0	1+1	0
17	MF	(France) FRA	Anthony Gonçalves	14	5	7+4	5	2	0	0+1	0
18	MF	(France) FRA	Ibrahima Sissoko	30	3	26+1	3	0	0	3	0
19	MF	(France) FRA	Anthony Caci	28	0	22+1	0	0	0	5	0
22	MF	(France) FRA	Youssouf Fofana	19	3	8+6	2	1	0	4	1
26	MF	(France) FRA	Adrien Thomasson	31	5	23+4	5	0	0	3+1	0
28	MF	(France) FRA	Samuel Grandsir	6	0	0+5	0	1	0	0	0
Forwards
9	FW	(Algeria) ALG	Idriss Saadi	1	0	0+1	0	0	0	0	0
12	FW	(South Africa) RSA	Lebo Mothiba	30	10	15+11	8	1	0	2+1	2
20	FW	(Mali) MLI	Kévin Lucien Zohi	25	2	6+13	1	1+1	1	2+2	0
25	FW	(France) FRA	Ludovic Ajorque	23	8	13+6	6	0	0	4	2
29	FW	(Cape Verde) CPV	Nuno da Costa	33	8	18+10	8	2	0	0+3	0
35	FW	(France) FRA	Mamoudou Karamoko	2	0	0	0	0+2	0	0	0
Players transferred out during the season

Last updated: 7 April 2019
Source: Competitions
