= 2019–20 RC Strasbourg Alsace season =

Strasbourg
2019–20 season
- Chairman: Marc Keller
- Manager: Thierry Laurey
- Stadium: Stade de la Meinau
- Ligue 1: 10th
- Coupe de France: Round of 16
- Coupe de la Ligue: Quarter-finals
- UEFA Europa League: Play-off round
- Top goalscorer: League: Ludovic Ajorque; Adrien Thomasson (8 each); All: Ludovic Ajorque (11)
Home colours	Away colours	Third colours

The 2019–20 season was Racing Club de Strasbourg Alsace's third season since its return to the top flight of French football. In addition to the domestic league, Strasbourg participated in this season's editions of the Coupe de France, the Coupe de la Ligue, and the UEFA Europa League. The season covered the period from 1 July 2019 to 30 June 2020.

== Players ==
=== First-team squad ===
As of 16 July 2019.

Note: Flags indicate national team as defined under FIFA eligibility rules; some limited exceptions apply. Players may hold more than one non-FIFA nationality.

No.	Pos.	Nation	Player
1	GK	BEL	Matz Sels
3	DF	SEN	Abdallah N'Dour
5	DF	CIV	Lamine Koné
6	MF	FRA	Jérémy Grimm
7	MF	TUN	Moataz Zemzemi
8	MF	FRA	Jonas Martin
10	MF	FRA	Benjamin Corgnet
11	MF	FRA	Dimitri Liénard
12	FW	RSA	Lebo Mothiba
13	DF	SRB	Stefan Mitrović (captain)
16	GK	JPN	Eiji Kawashima
17	MF	HAI	Jean-Ricner Bellegarde
18	MF	FRA	Ibrahima Sissoko

No.	Pos.	Nation	Player
19	MF	FRA	Anthony Caci
20	FW	MLI	Kévin Lucien Zohi
22	MF	FRA	Youssouf Fofana
23	DF	FRA	Lionel Carole
24	DF	FRA	Alexander Djiku
25	FW	FRA	Ludovic Ajorque
26	MF	FRA	Adrien Thomasson
27	DF	FRA	Kenny Lala
29	FW	CPV	Nuno da Costa
30	GK	FRA	Bingourou Kamara
32	DF	CMR	Duplexe Tchamba
33	DF	FRA	Ismaël Aaneba
35	FW	FRA	Mamoudou Karamoko
40	GK	FRA	Louis Pelletier

=== Out on loan ===
Note: Flags indicate national team as defined under FIFA eligibility rules; some limited exceptions apply. Players may hold more than one non-FIFA nationality.

No.	Pos.	Nation	Player
—	DF	POR	Diogo Branco (on loan to Montijo)
—	FW	ALG	Idriss Saadi (on loan to Cercle Brugge)

== Pre-season and friendlies ==
Win Draw Loss

3 July 2019 Friendly	Strasbourg	2–1	Zürich	Illzach, France
15:00 CEST (UTC+2)	Ajorque 44' (pen.); Botella 71'		Ceesay 26' (pen.)	Stadium: Stade Joseph Biechlin

7 July 2019 Friendly	Strasbourg	7–0	Reunion Selection	Eckbolsheim, France
17:00 CEST (UTC+2)	Liénard 2', 11'; Ichiza 15' (o.g.); Zohi 21'; Da Costa 36'; Corgnet 59'; Botella 81'

13 July 2019 Friendly	Standard Liège	0–2	Strasbourg	Seraing, Belgium
16:00 CEST (UTC+2)			Ajorque 13' (pen.), 69'	Stadium: Stade du Pairay

19 July 2019 Friendly	Strasbourg	3–1	Toulouse	Sarre-Union, France
18:00 CEST (UTC+2)	Da Costa 27'; Zohi 77'; Simakan 90'		Boisgard 61'	Stadium: Stade Omnisports

4 August 2019 Friendly	Strasbourg	3–2	UNFP Selection	Erstein, France
19:00 CEST (UTC+2)	Zohi 12'; Botella 44'; El Mansouri 90+5'		Ketkeophomphone 10'; Mandanne 70'

== Competitions ==
Win Draw Loss Fixtures

=== Overview ===
Competition	First match	Last match	Starting round	Final position	Record							
Competition	First match	Last match	Starting round	Final position	Pld	W	D	L	GF	GA	GD	Win %
Ligue 1	11 August 2019	29 February 2020	Matchday 1	10th	27	11	5	11	32	32	+0	40.74
Coupe de France	4 January 2020	29 January 2020	Round of 64	Round of 16	3	2	0	1	10	5	+5	66.67
Coupe de la Ligue	18 December 2019	7 January 2020	Round of 16	Quarter-finals	2	1	1	0	1	0	+1	50.00
Europa League	26 July 2019	29 August 2019	Second qualifying round	Play-off round	6	4	0	2	7	6	+1	66.67
Total					38	18	6	14	50	43	+7	47.37

Source: Soccerway

=== Ligue 1 ===
==== League table ====
Pos	Team	Pld	W	D	L	GF	GA	GD	Pts	PPG
8	Montpellier	28	11	7	10	35	34	+1	40	1.43
9	Monaco	28	11	7	10	44	44	0	40	1.43
10	Strasbourg	27	11	5	11	32	32	0	38	1.41
11	Angers	28	11	6	11	28	33	−5	39	1.39
12	Bordeaux	28	9	10	9	40	34	+6	37 (Note: Bordeaux finished ahead of Nantes on head-to-head points: Bordeaux 2–0 Nantes, Nantes 0–1 Bordeaux.)	1.32

Source: Ligue 1
Rules for classification: 1) Points per game; 2) Head-to-head points; 3) Head-to-head goal difference; 4) Goal difference; 5) Goals scored; 6) Fairplay ranking.

==== Results summary ====
Overall								Home						Away					
Pld	W	D	L	GF	GA	GD	Pts	W	D	L	GF	GA	GD	W	D	L	GF	GA	GD
27	11	5	11	32	32	0	38	7	3	3	22	14	+8	4	2	8	10	18	−8

Source: Matches

==== Results by round ====
Round	1	2	3	4	5	6	7	8	9	10	11	12	13	14	15	16	17	18	19	20	21	22	23	24	25	26	27	28	29	30	31	32	33	34	35	36	37	38
Ground	H	A	H	H	A	H	A	H	A	A	H	A	H	A	H	A	H	A	H	A	A	H	A	H	A	H	A	H	H	A	H	A	H	A	H	A	H	A
Result	D	D	L	D	L	W	L	W	L	L	W	L	W	W	L	L	W	W	W	L	W	L	W	W	D	D	L	C	C	C	C	C	C	C	C	C	C	C
Position	11	13	17	17	18	16	17	13	17	20	17	16	16	12	13	15	15	14	11	12	8	11	9	6	7	6	10	11	10	10	10	10	10	10	10	10	10	10

Source: Matches
A = Away; H = Home; W = Win; D = Draw; L = Loss; C = Cancelled

==== Matches ====
The Ligue 1 schedule was announced on 14 June 2019. The Ligue 1 matches were suspended by the LFP on 13 March 2020 due to COVID-19 until further notices. On 28 April 2020, it was announced that Ligue 1 and Ligue 2 campaigns would not resume, after the country banned all sporting events until September. On 30 April, The LFP ended officially the 2019–20 season.

11 August 2019 1	Strasbourg	1–1	Metz	Strasbourg
17:00 CEST (UTC+2)	Thomasson 21'	Report	Delaine (yellow card) 15'; Diallo 47'	Stadium: Stade de la Meinau; Attendance: 25,476; Referee: Antony Gautier

18 August 2019 2	Reims	0–0	Strasbourg	Reims
17:00 CEST (UTC+2)	Doumbia (yellow card) 37'; Kamara (yellow card) 54'	Report		Stadium: Stade Auguste Delaune; Attendance: 13,714; Referee: Florent Batta

25 August 2019 3	Strasbourg	0–2	Rennes	Strasbourg
17:00 CEST (UTC+2)	Koné (yellow card) 14'; Djiku (yellow card) 27'; Ndour (yellow card) 55' (yellow-red card) 83'	Report	Grenier 16'; Maouassa (yellow card) 22'; Bourigeaud (yellow card) 45'; Niang 54'	Stadium: Stade de la Meinau; Attendance: 24,951; Referee: Ruddy Buquet

1 September 2019 4	Strasbourg	2–2	Monaco	Strasbourg
17:00 CEST (UTC+2)	Simakan (yellow card) 13'; Lala 39' (pen.); Thomasson (yellow card) 67', (goal) 84'; Mitrović (yellow card) 69'; Da Costa (yellow card) 90+5'	Report	Slimani 11', 40'; Silva (yellow card) 31'; Maripán (yellow card) 37'; Gelson (yellow card) 82'	Stadium: Stade de la Meinau; Attendance: 24,556; Referee: Willy Delajod

14 September 2019 5	Paris Saint-Germain	1–0	Strasbourg	Paris
17:30 CEST (UTC+2)	Kurzawa (yellow card) 45+3'; Neymar 90+2'; Verratti (yellow card) 90+4'	Report	Bellegarde (yellow card) 45'; Ajorque (yellow card) 71'	Stadium: Parc des Princes; Attendance: 47,505; Referee: Amaury Delerue

20 September 2019 6	Strasbourg	2–1	Nantes	Strasbourg
20:45 CEST (UTC+2)	Liénard 66'; Koné (yellow card) 82'; Mitrović (yellow card) 83'; Ajorque 89' (pen.)	Report	Coulibaly 28'; Louza (yellow card) 73'; Fábio (yellow card) 88'	Stadium: Stade de la Meinau; Attendance: 24,013; Referee: Florent Batta

25 September 2019 7	Lille	2–0	Strasbourg	Villeneuve-d'Ascq
19:00 CEST (UTC+2)	Osimhen 43'; Rémy 64'	Report	Sissoko (yellow card) 45'	Stadium: Stade Pierre-Mauroy; Attendance: 30,103; Referee: Johan Hamel

29 September 2019 8	Strasbourg	1–0	Montpellier	Strasbourg
15:00 CEST (UTC+2)	Da Costa (yellow card) 17'; Ajorque 26', (yellow card) 32'; Simakan (yellow card) 45'; Djiku (yellow card) 77'	Report	Dolly (yellow card) 35'; Mendes (yellow card) 67'	Stadium: Stade de la Meinau; Attendance: 25,010; Referee: Hakim Ben El Hadj

5 October 2019 9	Dijon	1–0	Strasbourg	Dijon
20:00 CEST (UTC+2)	Pereira (yellow card) 29'; Mendyl (yellow card) 36'; Mavididi 38'; Cádiz (yellow card) 90+2'	Report	Djiku (yellow card) 64'; Sissoko (yellow card) 78'; Mitrović (yellow card) 88'	Stadium: Stade Gaston Gérard; Attendance: 12,124; Referee: Olivier Thual

20 October 2019 10	Marseille	2–0	Strasbourg	Marseille
21:00 CEST (UTC+2)	Kamara 3'; Ćaleta-Car (yellow card) 26'; Sakai (yellow card) 53'; Benedetto (yellow card) 73'; Strootman 90+5' (pen.)	Report	Bellegarde (yellow card) 78'; Koné (yellow card) 90+3'	Stadium: Stade Vélodrome; Attendance: 50,203; Referee: Jérôme Brisard

26 October 2019 11	Strasbourg	1–0	Nice	Strasbourg
20:00 CEST (UTC+2)	Thomasson 24'; Liénard (yellow card) 36'	Report	Coly (yellow card) 50' (yellow-red card) 56'; Atal (yellow card) 63'	Stadium: Stade de la Meinau; Attendance: 25,007; Referee: Mikael Lesage

2 November 2019 12	Angers	1–0	Strasbourg	Angers
20:00 CET (UTC+1)	Bahoken 26' (pen.); Aït-Nouri (yellow card) 89'	Report	Zohi (yellow card) 76'	Stadium: Stade Raymond Kopa; Attendance: 9,681; Referee: Florent Batta

9 November 2019 13	Strasbourg	4–1	Nîmes	Strasbourg
20:00 CET (UTC+1)	Ajorque 14'; Thomasson (yellow card) 16'; Mitrović (yellow card) 23'; Mothiba 45+2', 85'; Liénard 69'	Report	Miguel (yellow card) 40' (yellow-red card) 66'; Philippoteaux 48'	Stadium: Stade de la Meinau; Attendance: 24,745; Referee: Ruddy Buquet

23 November 2019 14	Amiens	0–4	Strasbourg	Amiens
20:00 CET (UTC+1)	Chedjou (yellow card) 70' (yellow-red card) 82'	Report	Caci 43'; Ajorque 56'; Mothiba 72'; Da Costa 76'; Simakan (yellow card) 78'	Stadium: Stade de la Licorne; Attendance: 10,358; Referee: Alain Bieri (Switzerland)

30 November 2019 15	Strasbourg	1–2	Lyon	Strasbourg
17:30 CET (UTC+1)	Fofana 22'; Lala (yellow card) 47'; Ajorque (yellow card) 68'; Da Costa (yellow card) 89'	Report	Cornet 40'; Reine-Adelaide 75'; Dembélé (yellow card) 90+4'	Stadium: Stade de la Meinau; Attendance: 25,455; Referee: Mikael Lesage

3 December 2019 16	Brest	5–0	Strasbourg	Brest
19:00 CET (UTC+1)	Mendy 21'; Cardona (yellow card) 35'; Battocchio 45+1', 53', 75'; N'Goma (yellow card) 82', (goal) 90+4' (pen.)	Report	Liénard (yellow card) 90+2'	Stadium: Stade Francis-Le Blé; Attendance: 12,437; Referee: Jérôme Brisard

7 December 2019 17	Strasbourg	4–2	Toulouse	Strasbourg
20:00 CET (UTC+1)	Koné 7'; Thomasson 27'; Ajorque 48'; Mothiba 76'	Report	Isimat-Mirin 4'; Saïd 50'; Leya Iseka (yellow card) 77'	Stadium: Stade de la Meinau; Attendance: 23,634; Referee: Johan Hamel

15 December 2019 18	Bordeaux	0–1	Strasbourg	Bordeaux
15:00 CET (UTC+1)	Briand (yellow card) 63'; Mexer (yellow card) 69'; Otávio (yellow card) 82'	Report	Ajorque 11'; Thomasson (yellow card) 42'; Djiku (yellow card) 48'	Stadium: Matmut Atlantique; Attendance: 18,710; Referee: Florent Batta

21 December 2019 19	Strasbourg	2–1	Saint-Étienne	Strasbourg
20:45 CET (UTC+1)	Ajorque 22'; Thomasson (yellow card) 61', (goal) 62'; Da Costa (yellow card) 78'; Carole (yellow card) 90+1'	Report	Nordin (yellow card) 67'; Boudebouz 72' (pen.); Trauco (yellow card) 82'	Stadium: Stade de la Meinau; Attendance: 25,471; Referee: Olivier Thual

11 January 2020 20	Metz	1–0	Strasbourg	Metz
20:00 CET (UTC+1)	Boye 68', (yellow card) 74'	Report	Sissoko (yellow card) 54'; Djiku (yellow card) 86'	Stadium: Stade Saint-Symphorien; Attendance: 18,079; Referee: Jérôme Brisard

25 January 2020 21	Monaco	1–3	Strasbourg	Monaco
20:00 CET (UTC+1)	Jovetić (yellow card) 81', (goal) 86'	Report	Ajorque 40'; Thomasson 66'; Mitrović 74'	Stadium: Stade Louis II; Attendance: 4,800; Referee: Eric Wattellier

1 February 2020 22	Strasbourg	1–2	Lille	Strasbourg
20:00 CET (UTC+1)	Thomasson 12'; Carole (yellow card) 79'	Report	Çelik (yellow card) 35'; Xeka (yellow card) 42'; Gabriel (yellow card) 62', (goal) 65'; Osimhen 80' (pen.); André (yellow card) 87'	Stadium: Stade de la Meinau; Attendance: 25,137; Referee: Stéphanie Frappart

5 February 2020 23	Toulouse	0–1	Strasbourg	Toulouse
19:00 CET (UTC+1)	Boisgard (yellow card) 59'	Report	Waris 76'; Carole (yellow card) 83'; Sissoko (yellow card) 90+2'	Stadium: Stadium de Toulouse; Attendance: 16,596; Referee: Karim Abed

9 February 2020 24	Strasbourg	3–0	Reims	Strasbourg
17:00 CET (UTC+1)	Liénard (yellow card) 45'; Djiku 50'; Waris 82'; Lala 90+4' (pen.)	Report	Touré (yellow card) 67'; Doumbia (yellow card) 78'	Stadium: Stade de la Meinau; Attendance: 25,241; Referee: Thomas Léonard

16 February 2020 25	Lyon	1–1	Strasbourg	Décines-Charpieu
15:00 CET (UTC+1)	Traoré 21', (yellow card) 41'; Aouar (yellow card) 79'; Dembélé (yellow card) 90+4'	Report	Zohi 43'; Koné (yellow card) 47'	Stadium: Parc Olympique Lyonnais; Attendance: 45,141; Referee: Johan Hamel

22 February 2020 26	Strasbourg	0–0	Amiens	Strasbourg
20:00 CET (UTC+1)	Sissoko (yellow card) 16'; Simakan (yellow card) 86'	Report	Opoku (yellow card) 19'; Zungu (yellow card) 27'; Chedjou (yellow card) 51'; Aleesami (yellow card) 53'; Diabaté (yellow card) 63'; Monconduit (yellow card) 80'	Stadium: Stade de la Meinau; Attendance: 25,076; Referee: Amaury Delerue

29 February 2020 27	Montpellier	3–0	Strasbourg	Montpellier
20:00 CET (UTC+1)	Savanier 57' (pen.), 65'; Laborde 61'; Le Tallec (yellow card) 72'	Report	Djiku (yellow card) 56'; Waris (yellow card) 90+2'	Stadium: Stade de la Mosson; Attendance: 11,799; Referee: Mikael Lesage

29	Strasbourg	Cancelled	Dijon	Strasbourg
--:-- CEST (UTC+2)				Stadium: Stade de la Meinau; Attendance: 0

28	Strasbourg	Cancelled	Paris Saint-Germain	Strasbourg
--:-- CEST (UTC+2)				Stadium: Stade de la Meinau; Attendance: 0
Note: Match originally scheduled for 7 March, but postponed due to coronavirus concerns, and rearranged for 18 March.

30	Saint-Étienne	Cancelled	Strasbourg	Saint-Étienne
--:-- CEST (UTC+2)				Stadium: Stade Geoffroy-Guichard; Attendance: 0

31	Strasbourg	Cancelled	Angers	Strasbourg
--:-- CEST (UTC+2)				Stadium: Stade de la Meinau; Attendance: 0

32	Nice	Cancelled	Strasbourg	Nice
--:-- CEST (UTC+2)				Stadium: Allianz Riviera

33	Strasbourg	Cancelled	Brest	Strasbourg
--:-- CEST (UTC+2)				Stadium: Stade de la Meinau

34	Rennes	Cancelled	Strasbourg	Rennes
--:-- CEST (UTC+2)				Stadium: Roazhon Park

35	Strasbourg	Cancelled	Marseille	Strasbourg
--:-- CEST (UTC+2)				Stadium: Stade de la Meinau

36	Nîmes	Cancelled	Strasbourg	Nîmes
--:-- CEST (UTC+2)				Stadium: Stade des Costières

37	Strasbourg	Cancelled	Bordeaux	Strasbourg
--:-- CEST (UTC+2)				Stadium: Stade de la Meinau

38	Nantes	Cancelled	Strasbourg	Nantes
--:-- CEST (UTC+2)				Stadium: Stade de la Beaujoire

=== Coupe de France ===
4 January 2020 Round of 64	Stade Portelois	1–4	Strasbourg	Calais
15:00 CET (UTC+1)	Bultel 35'; Diop (yellow card) 83'	Report	Corgnet 3'; Zohi 59', 65'; Lebeau 86' (pen.)	Stadium: Stade de l'Épopée; Attendance: 7,746; Referee: Benoît Millot

18 January 2020 Round of 32	Angoulême-Soyaux Charente	1–5	Strasbourg	Angoulême
18:00 CET (UTC+1)	Franco 6'; Portejoie (yellow card) 16'; Lobo (yellow card) 53'	Report	Djiku (yellow card) 18', (goal) 43'; Zohi 34'; Thomasson 36'; Bellegarde 38'; Ajorque 82' (pen.)	Stadium: Stade Chanzy; Attendance: 5,945; Referee: Jérémy Stinat

29 January 2020 Round of 16	Marseille	3–1	Strasbourg	Marseille
21:05 CET (UTC+1)	Sarr 32'; Payet 43' (pen.); Lopez (yellow card) 57'; Kamara 90+5'	Report	Mitrović (yellow card) 18'; Corgnet 59'; Ndour (red card) 86'; Simakan (yellow card) 90+2'	Stadium: Stade Vélodrome; Attendance: 29,589; Referee: Mikael Lesage

=== Coupe de la Ligue ===
18 December 2019 Round of 16	Nantes	0–1	Strasbourg	Nantes
21:05 CET (UTC+1)		Report	Da Costa 78'	Stadium: Stade de la Beaujoire; Attendance: 9,565; Referee: Eric Wattellier

7 January 2020 Quarter-finals	Reims	0–0 (4–2 p)	Strasbourg	Reims
21:00 CET (UTC+1)	Chavalerin (yellow card) 36'; Mbuku (red card) 58'	Report	Sissoko (yellow card) 47'	Stadium: Stade Auguste-Delaune; Attendance: 10,202; Referee: François Letexier
	Penalties
	Donis (penalty missed); Oudin (penalty scored); Disasi (penalty scored); Kamara (penalty scored); Abdelhamid (penalty scored)		(penalty scored) Djiku; (penalty scored) Ajorque; (penalty missed) Bellegarde; (penalty missed) Corgnet

=== UEFA Europa League ===
==== Second qualifying round ====
26 July 2019 First leg	Strasbourg (France)	3–1	(Israel) Maccabi Haifa	Strasbourg, France
20:45 CEST (UTC+2)	Ajorque 45' (pen.); Fofana (yellow card) 45+4'; Aaneba (yellow card) 45+5'; Thomasson 47'; Martin 61'	Report	Plakuschenko 39'; Habshi (red card) 44'; Arad (yellow card) 88'	Stadium: Stade de la Meinau; Attendance: 20,137; Referee: Kevin Blom (Netherlands)

1 August 2019 Second leg	Maccabi Haifa (Israel)	2–1 (3–4 agg.)	(France) Strasbourg	Haifa, Israel
20:00 IDT (UTC+3)	Menachem (yellow card) 21'; Shua 25'; Rukavytsya 40'	Report	Ajorque 17'	Stadium: Sammy Ofer Stadium; Attendance: 23,038; Referee: Maurizio Mariani (Italy)

==== Third qualifying round ====
8 August 2019 First leg	Lokomotiv Plovdiv (Bulgaria)	0–1	(France) Strasbourg	Plovdiv, Bulgaria
20:30 EEST (UTC+3)	Tomašević (red card) 11'; Umarbayev (yellow card) 19'; Iliev (yellow card) 87'	Report	Mitrović 11'; Fofana (yellow card) 39'	Stadium: Lokomotiv Stadium; Attendance: 7,600; Referee: João Pinheiro (Portugal)

15 August 2019 Second leg	Strasbourg (France)	1–0 (2–0 agg.)	(Bulgaria) Lokomotiv Plovdiv	Strasbourg, France
20:30 CEST (UTC+2)	Zohi 8'; Simakan (yellow card) 30'	Report		Stadium: Stade de la Meinau; Attendance: 19,109; Referee: John Beaton (Scotland)

==== Play-off round ====
22 August 2019 First leg	Strasbourg (France)	1–0	(Germany) Eintracht Frankfurt	Strasbourg, France
20:30 CEST (UTC+2)	Martin (yellow card) 31'; Zohi 33'; Koné (yellow card) 44'; Thomasson (yellow card) 71'	Report	Abraham (yellow card) 31'; Hasebe (yellow card) 51'	Stadium: Stade de la Meinau; Attendance: 21,708; Referee: Ivan Kružliak (Slovakia)

29 August 2019 Second leg	Eintracht Frankfurt (Germany)	3–0 (3–1 agg.)	(France) Strasbourg	Frankfurt, Germany
20:30 CEST (UTC+2)	Mitrović 26' (o.g.); Rebić (red card) 44'; Hasebe (yellow card) 44'; Kohr (yellow card) 55'; Kostić 60'; Da Costa 66'; Hinteregger (yellow card) 76'; Fernandes (yellow card) 79'	Report	Thomasson (yellow card) 29'; Liénard (red card) 55'	Stadium: Waldstadion; Attendance: 47,000; Referee: Orel Grinfeld (Israel)

== Statistics ==
=== Appearances and goals ===
No.	Pos	Nat	Player	Total		Ligue 1		Coupe de France		Coupe de la Ligue		Europa League	
No.	Pos	Nat	Player	Apps	Goals	Apps	Goals	Apps	Goals	Apps	Goals	Apps	Goals
Goalkeepers
1	GK	(Belgium) BEL	Matz Sels	35	0	27	0	2	0	0	0	6	0
16	GK	(Japan) JPN	Eiji Kawashima	0	0	0	0	0	0	0	0	0	0
30	GK	(France) FRA	Bingourou Kamara	4	0	0	0	1	0	2	0	0+1	0
40	GK	(France) FRA	Louis Pelletier	0	0	0	0	0	0	0	0	0	0
Defenders
2	DF	(France) FRA	Mohamed Simakan	25	0	17+2	0	0+1	0	0	0	4+1	0
3	DF	(Senegal) SEN	Abdallah Ndour	9	0	4+2	0	0	0	1	0	2	0
5	DF	(Ivory Coast) CIV	Lamine Koné	21	1	17+1	1	2	0	1	0	0	0
13	DF	(Serbia) SRB	Stefan Mitrović	32	2	23	1	2	0	2	0	5	1
23	DF	(France) FRA	Lionel Carole	27	0	14+4	0	3	0	1	0	5	0
24	DF	(France) FRA	Alexander Djiku	33	2	23+2	1	1	1	2	0	5	0
27	DF	(France) FRA	Kenny Lala	33	2	22+3	2	1+1	0	2	0	2+2	0
33	DF	(France) FRA	Ismaël Aaneba	4	0	0	0	3	0	0	0	1	0
Midfielders
6	MF	(France) FRA	Jérémy Grimm	2	0	0+1	0	1	0	0	0	0	0
10	MF	(France) FRA	Benjamin Corgnet	11	2	3+3	0	2	2	1+1	0	1	0
11	MF	(France) FRA	Dimitri Liénard	30	2	16+6	2	2	0	1	0	4+1	0
14	MF	(Bosnia and Herzegovina) BIH	Sanjin Prcić	4	0	1+2	0	0	0	0+1	0	0	0
17	MF	(Haiti) HAI	Jean-Ricner Bellegarde	30	1	16+8	0	2	1	1	0	2+1	0
18	MF	(France) FRA	Ibrahima Sissoko	32	0	18+5	0	2+1	0	2	0	2+2	0
19	MF	(France) FRA	Anthony Caci	10	1	8	1	1	0	0+1	0	0	0
26	MF	(France) FRA	Adrien Thomasson	32	10	24+1	8	1+1	1	1	0	3+1	1
34	MF	(France) FRA	Adrien Lebeau	6	1	0+2	0	1+1	1	0+2	0	0	0
Forwards
8	FW	(Ghana) GHA	Abdul Majeed Waris	8	2	4+3	2	1	0	0	0	0	0
12	FW	(South Africa) RSA	Lebo Mothiba	23	3	12+9	3	0	0	0	0	0+2	0
20	FW	(Mali) MLI	Kévin Lucien Zohi	27	6	5+12	1	3	3	1+1	0	3+2	2
25	FW	(France) FRA	Ludovic Ajorque	35	11	24+2	8	1+1	1	1	0	4+2	2
Players transferred out during the season
7	MF	(Tunisia) TUN	Moataz Zemzemi	1	0	0+1	0	0	0	0	0	0	0
22	MF	(France) FRA	Youssouf Fofana	19	1	12+1	1	0+1	0	2	0	3	0
28	MF	(France) FRA	Jonas Martin	9	1	3	0	0	0	0	0	5+1	1
29	FW	(Cape Verde) CPV	Nuno da Costa	20	2	4+10	1	0	0	1	1	3+2	0
32	DF	(Cameroon) CMR	Duplexe Tchamba	0	0	0	0	0	0	0	0	0	0
35	FW	(France) FRA	Mamoudou Karamoko	0	0	0	0	0	0	0	0	0	0

Last updated: 29 February 2020
Source: Competitions
