= 2017–18 RC Strasbourg Alsace season =

Strasbourg
2017–18 season
- Manager: Thierry Laurey
- Stadium: Stade de la Meinau
- Ligue 1: 15th
- Coupe de France: Quarter-finals
- Coupe de la Ligue: Round of 16
- Top goalscorer: League: Stéphane Bahoken (7); All: Stéphane Bahoken (9)
Home colours	Away colours	Third colours

The 2017–18 Ligue 1 season was RC Strasbourg Alsace's first season in the top flight of French football since their relegation in the 2007–08 season.

The club finished 15th, escaping relegation on the final day.

== Players ==
=== First team squad ===
As of 27 January 2018

Note: Flags indicate national team as defined under FIFA eligibility rules; some limited exceptions apply. Players may hold more than one non-FIFA nationality.

No.	Pos.	Nation	Player
1	GK	FRA	Landry Bonnefoi
2	DF	FRA	Dimitri Foulquier (on loan from Watford)
3	DF	SEN	Abdallah N'Dour
4	DF	FRA	Pablo Martinez
5	MF	FRA	Vincent Nogueira
6	MF	FRA	Jérémy Grimm
8	MF	CIV	Jean-Eudes Aholou
9	FW	ALG	Idriss Saadi
10	MF	FRA	Benjamin Corgnet
11	MF	FRA	Dimitri Liénard
12	DF	SEN	Kader Mangane (vice captain)
13	FW	FRA	Jérémy Blayac
16	GK	ALG	Alexandre Oukidja
17	MF	FRA	Anthony Gonçalves

No.	Pos.	Nation	Player
19	FW	CMR	Stéphane Bahoken
20	MF	FRA	Martin Terrier (on loan from Lyon)
21	DF	GUF	Yoann Salmier
22	DF	FRA	Ernest Seka (captain)
26	DF	BFA	Bakary Koné (on loan from Malaga)
27	DF	FRA	Kenny Lala
28	MF	FRA	Jonas Martin
29	FW	CPV	Nuno da Costa
30	GK	FRA	Bingourou Kamara
33	DF	CMR	Ismael Aaneba
34	MF	MLI	Kévin Lucien Zohi
35	MF	FRA	Anthony Caci
—	DF	CMR	Duplexe Tchamba

== Competitions ==
=== Ligue 1 ===
==== League table ====
Pos	Team	Pld	W	D	L	GF	GA	GD	Pts
13	Amiens	38	12	9	17	37	42	−5	45
14	Angers	38	9	14	15	42	52	−10	41
15	Strasbourg	38	9	11	18	44	67	−23	38
16	Caen	38	10	8	20	27	52	−25	38
17	Lille	38	10	8	20	41	67	−26	38

Source: Ligue 1 and Soccerway
Rules for classification: 1) Points; 2) Goal difference; 3) Head-to-head points; 4) Head-to-head goal difference; 5) Head-to-head goals scored; 6) Head-to-head away goals; 7) Goals scored; 8) Away goals scored; 9) Most goals scored in one league match; 10) Fair-play points

==== Results summary ====
Overall								Home						Away					
Pld	W	D	L	GF	GA	GD	Pts	W	D	L	GF	GA	GD	W	D	L	GF	GA	GD
38	9	11	18	44	67	−23	38	7	6	6	27	27	0	2	5	12	17	40	−23

Last updated: 19 May 2018.

==== Results by round ====
Round	1	2	3	4	5	6	7	8	9	10	11	12	13	14	15	16	17	18	19	20	21	22	23	24	25	26	27	28	29	30	31	32	33	34	35	36	37	38
Ground	A	H	A	A	H	A	H	A	H	A	H	A	H	A	H	H	A	H	A	H	A	H	A	H	H	A	H	A	H	A	H	A	H	A	H	A	H	A
Result	L	W	D	L	L	L	L	D	D	W	D	L	W	D	D	W	W	W	L	L	L	W	L	L	W	L	D	L	L	D	D	D	L	L	D	L	W	L
Position	20	13	10	14	18	19	19	19	18	17	18	18	18	17	17	16	12	8	11	11	12	10	12	14	13	14	14	15	15	15	16	16	16	17	16	17	16	15

A = Away; H = Home; W = Win; D = Draw; L = Loss

=== Coupe de France ===
7 January 2018 Round of 64	Strasbourg	3–2 (a.e.t.)	Dijon	Strasbourg
14:15 CET	Goncalves 59'; Blayac 92'; Nuno Joia 93'	Report	Djilobodji 65'	Stadium: Stade de la Meinau; Attendance: 12,269; Referee: Benoît Millot

25 January 2018 Round of 32	Strasbourg	2–1	Lille	Strasbourg
21:05 CET	Nuno da Costa 31'; Saadi 48'	Report	Bissouma 54'	Stadium: Stade de la Meinau; Referee: [[Clement Turpin]

8 February 2018 Round of 16	Grenoble Foot 38	0–3	Strasbourg	Grenoble
21:00 CET		Report	Bahoken 32'; Terrier 78'; Goncalves 90+4'	Stadium: Stade des Alpes; Referee: Olivier Thual

28 February 2018 Quarter-finals	FC Chambly	1–0	Strasbourg	Beauvais
18:30 CET	Doucoure 83'	Report		Stadium: Stade Pierre Brisson; Attendance: 4,732; Referee: Nicolas Rainville

== Statistics ==
=== Appearances and goals ===
No.	Pos	Nat	Player	Total		Ligue 1		Coupe de France		Coupe de la Ligue	
No.	Pos	Nat	Player	Apps	Goals	Apps	Goals	Apps	Goals	Apps	Goals
Goalkeepers
1	GK	(France) FRA	Landry Bonnefoi	5	0	3+1	0	0	0	0+1	0
16	GK	(France) FRA	Alexandre Oukidja	21	0	16+1	0	2	0	2	0
30	GK	(France) FRA	Bingourou Kamara	21	0	19	0	2	0	0	0
40	GK	(France) FRA	Bastien Rempp	0	0	0	0	0	0	0	0
Defenders
2	DF	(France) FRA	Dimitri Foulquier	19	0	13+3	0	2	0	1	0
3	DF	(Senegal) SEN	Abdallah Ndour	5	0	3+2	0	0	0	0	0
4	DF	(France) FRA	Pablo Martinez	25	0	24	0	1	0	0	0
12	DF	(Senegal) SEN	Kader Mangane	21	1	20	1	1	0	0	0
21	DF	(French Guiana) GUF	Yoann Salmier	19	0	12+2	0	3	0	2	0
22	DF	(France) FRA	Ernest Seka	32	1	25+2	1	4	0	1	0
26	DF	(Burkina Faso) BFA	Bakary Koné	33	2	27+1	2	3	0	2	0
27	DF	(France) FRA	Kenny Lala	37	3	30+1	3	2+2	0	2	0
33	DF	(France) FRA	Ismaïl Aaneba	1	0	0	0	1	0	0	0
Midfielders
5	MF	(France) FRA	Vincent Nogueira	7	0	1+2	0	2	0	2	0
6	MF	(France) FRA	Jérémy Grimm	29	2	7+16	1	3+1	0	2	1
8	MF	(Ivory Coast) CIV	Jean-Eudes Aholou	38	7	35	5	2+1	1+1	0	0
10	MF	(France) FRA	Benjamin Corgnet	18	0	15+3	0	0	0	0	0
11	MF	(France) FRA	Dimitri Liénard	38	5	29+4	5	2+1	0	1+1	0
17	MF	(France) FRA	Anthony Gonçalves	35	2	18+11	0	4	2	1+1	0
28	MF	(France) FRA	Jonas Martin	37	4	36	4	1	0	0	0
35	MF	(France) FRA	Anthony Caci	0	0	0	0	0	0	0	0
Forwards
9	FW	(Algeria) ALG	Idriss Saadi	29	5	10+16	4	2	1	1	0
13	FW	(France) FRA	Jérémy Blayac	30	5	7+18	3	1+2	1	1+1	1
19	FW	(France) FRA	Stéphane Bahoken	32	9	19+7	7	3+1	1	2	1
20	FW	(France) FRA	Martin Terrier	29	4	19+6	3	1+2	1	0+1	0
29	FW	(Cape Verde) CPV	Nuno da Costa	28	7	22+4	5	2	2	0	0
34	FW	(Ivory Coast) CIV	Kévin Zohi	1	0	0+1	0	0	0	0	0
Players transferred out during the season
7	MF	(France) FRA	Ihsan Sacko	19	0	8+9	0	0+1	0	1	0

Last updated: 30 May 2018
Source: WorldFootball
