= Sanjin Prcić =

Bosnian footballer (born 1993)

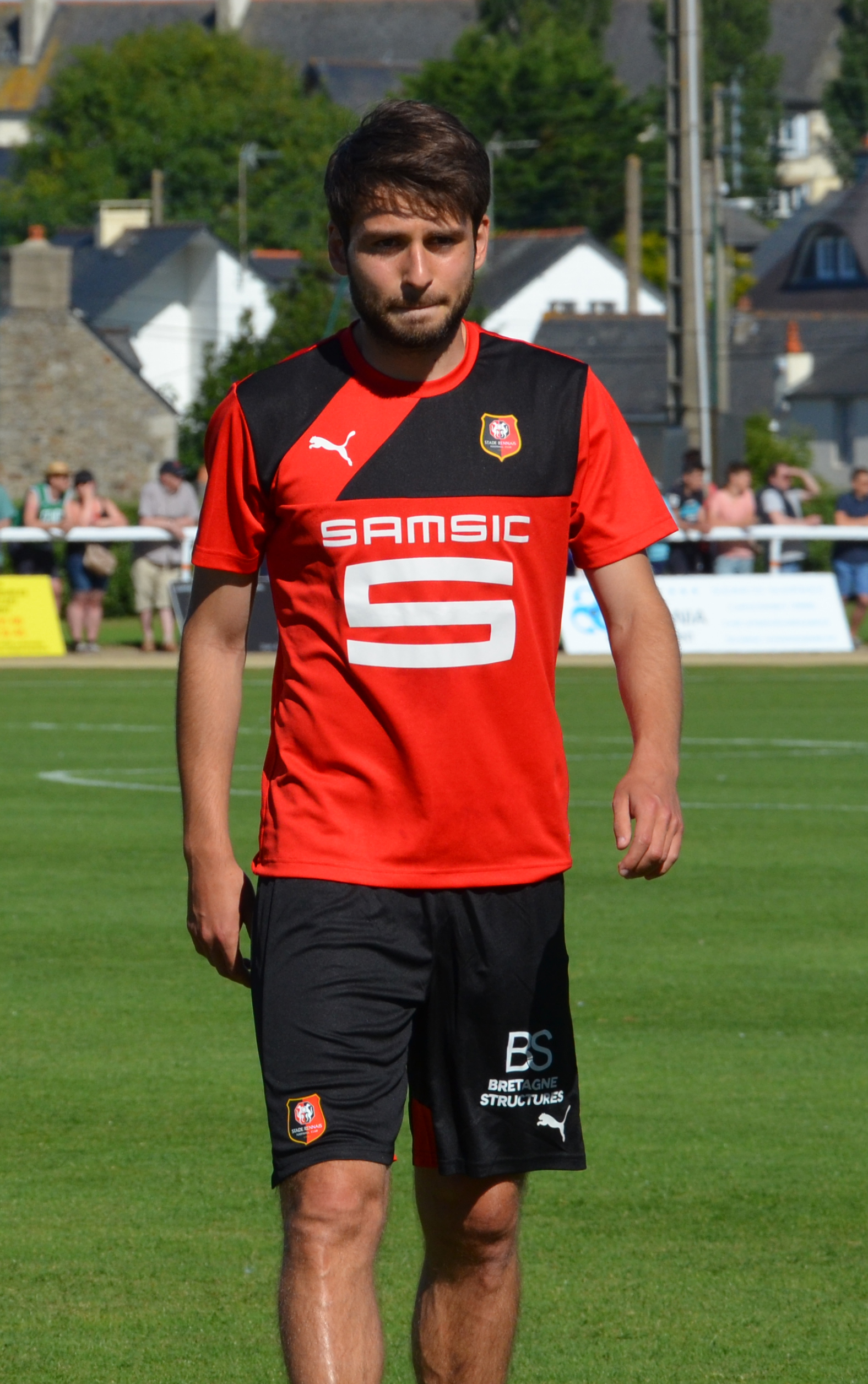
- Prcić with Rennes in 2016

Personal information
- Date of birth: 20 November 1993 (age 32)
- Place of birth: Belfort, France
- Height: 1.81 m (5 ft 11 in)
- Position: Midfielder

Youth career
- 2001–2011: Sochaux

Senior career*
Years	Team	Apps	(Gls)
2011–2013	Sochaux II	56	(6)
2013–2014	Sochaux	29	(0)
2014–2018	Rennes	61	(3)
2015–2016	→ Torino (loan)	2	(0)
2016	→ Perugia (loan)	13	(3)
2018–2019	Levante	10	(0)
2019	→ Strasbourg (loan)	13	(2)
2019–2024	Strasbourg	81	(2)

International career
2008–2010	Bosnia and Herzegovina U17	12	(0)
2011–2012	Bosnia and Herzegovina U19	6	(1)
2011–2013	Bosnia and Herzegovina U21	9	(2)
2014–2023	Bosnia and Herzegovina	17	(0)
- * Club domestic league appearances and goals as of 3 September 2023

Sanjin Prcić (pronounced [sǎɲin přtsitɕ]; born 20 November 1993) is a professional footballer who plays as a midfielder. Born in France, he played for the Bosnia and Herzegovina national team.

Prcić started his professional career at Sochaux, before joining Rennes in 2014. He was sent on loan to Torino in 2015 and to Perugia in 2016. Two years later, he moved to Levante, who loaned him to Strasbourg in 2019, with whom he signed permanently later that year.

A former youth international for Bosnia and Herzegovina, Prcić made his senior international debut in 2014, earning 17 caps until 2023.

== Club career ==
=== Sochaux ===
Prcić came through Sochaux's youth academy, which he joined in 2001. He signed his first professional contract with the team in March 2012. In September 2012, he suffered a severe knee injury, which was diagnosed as an anterior cruciate ligament tear and was ruled out for at least six months. He made his professional debut against Ajaccio on 31 August 2013 at the age of 19. On 30 October, he scored his first professional goal in a Coupe de la Ligue game against Montpellier.

=== Rennes ===
In August 2014, Prcić was transferred to Rennes for an undisclosed fee. He made his official debut for the club against Évian on 16 August. On 25 April 2015, he scored his first goal for Rennes in a triumph over Nice.

In August, Prcić was sent on a season-long loan to Italian side Torino.

In January 2016, he was loaned to Perugia until the end of the season.

=== Levante ===
In August 2018, Prcić moved to Spanish outfit Levante on a three-year deal. He made his competitive debut for the team on 17 August against Betis.

=== Strasbourg ===
In January 2019, Prcić was sent on a six-month loan to Strasbourg. He debuted officially for the side in a Coupe de la Ligue tie against Bordeaux on 30 January. A week later, he made his league debut against Angers and managed to score a goal. He won his first trophy with the club on 30 March, by beating Guingamp in the Coupe de la Ligue final.

In September, Strasbourg signed Prcić on a three-year contract.

In May 2022, he extended his deal with the squad until June 2025.

He played his 100th match for the team against Toulouse on 27 August 2023.

== International career ==
Prcić represented Bosnia and Herzegovina at all youth levels. He also served as a captain of the under-17 team under coach Velimir Stojnić.

In August 2014, he received his first senior call up, for a friendly game against Liechtenstein and a UEFA Euro 2016 qualifier against Cyprus. He debuted against the former on 4 September.

== Career statistics ==
=== Club ===
As of match played 3 September 2023

Appearances and goals by club, season and competition
Club	Season	League			National cup (Note: Includes Coupe de France, Coppa Italia, Copa del Rey)		League cup (Note: Includes Coupe de la Ligue)		Total	
Club	Season	Division	Apps	Goals	Apps	Goals	Apps	Goals	Apps	Goals
Sochaux II	2010–11	Championnat National 2	14	1	–		–		14	1
Sochaux II	2011–12	Championnat National 2	24	3	–		–		24	3
Sochaux II	2012–13	Championnat National 2	17	2	–		–		17	2
Sochaux II	2013–14	Championnat National 2	1	0	–		–		1	0
Sochaux II	Total		56	6	–		–		56	6
Sochaux	2013–14	Ligue 1	29	0	2	1	1	1	32	2
Rennes	2014–15	Ligue 1	17	1	1	0	2	0	20	1
Rennes	2016–17	Ligue 1	25	1	2	0	1	0	28	1
Rennes	2017–18	Ligue 1	19	1	0	0	1	1	20	2
Rennes	Total		61	3	3	0	4	1	68	4
Torino (loan)	2015–16	Serie A	2	0	1	0	–		3	0
Perugia (loan)	2015–16	Serie B	13	3	–		–		13	3
Levante	2018–19	La Liga	10	0	4	0	–		14	0
Strasbourg (loan)	2018–19	Ligue 1	13	2	–		2	0	15	2
Strasbourg	2019–20	Ligue 1	3	0	0	0	1	0	4	0
Strasbourg	2020–21	Ligue 1	14	0	1	0	–		15	0
Strasbourg	2021–22	Ligue 1	32	1	2	0	–		34	1
Strasbourg	2022–23	Ligue 1	29	1	1	0	–		30	1
Strasbourg	2023–24	Ligue 1	3	0	0	0	–		3	0
Strasbourg	Total		94	4	4	0	3	0	101	4
Career total			265	16	14	1	8	2	287	19

=== International ===
Appearances and goals by national team and year
National team	Year	Apps	Goals
Bosnia and Herzegovina
Bosnia and Herzegovina	2014	3	0
Bosnia and Herzegovina	2015	1	0
Bosnia and Herzegovina	2016	1	0
Bosnia and Herzegovina	2017	1	0
Bosnia and Herzegovina	2018	2	0
Bosnia and Herzegovina	2019	0	0
Bosnia and Herzegovina	2020	0	0
Bosnia and Herzegovina	2021	3	0
Bosnia and Herzegovina	2022	3	0
Bosnia and Herzegovina	2023	3	0
Total		17	0

== Honours ==
Strasbourg

- Coupe de la Ligue: 2018–19
