= Jonas Martin =

French footballer (born 1990)

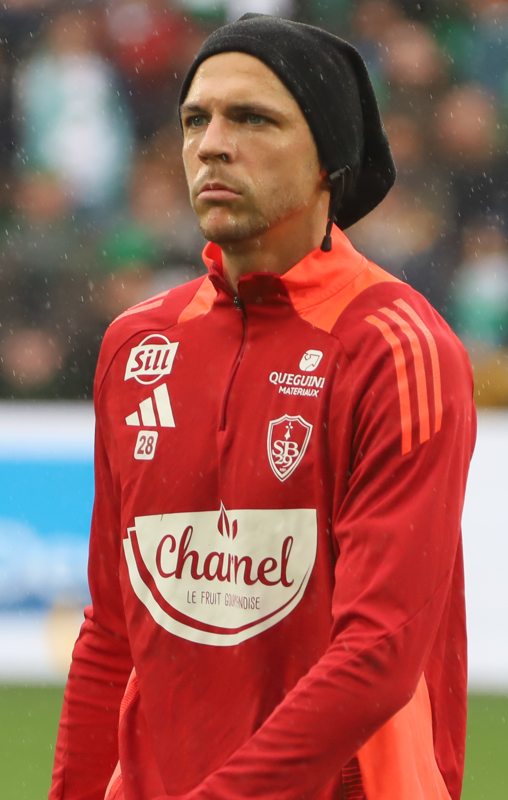
- Martin in 2025

Personal information
- Full name: Jonas Serge Martin
- Date of birth: 9 April 1990 (age 36)
- Place of birth: Besançon, France
- Height: 1.84 m (6 ft 0 in)
- Position: Midfielder

Team information
- Current team: Boulogne
- Number: 8

Youth career
- 1997–2000: Rigny
- 2000–2004: Nîmes
- 2004–2008: Montpellier

Senior career*
Years	Team	Apps	(Gls)
2008–2014	Montpellier II	64	(16)
2010–2016	Montpellier	92	(4)
2011–2012	→ Amiens (loan)	26	(3)
2016–2017	Betis	20	(2)
2017–2019	Strasbourg	62	(7)
2019–2022	Rennes	44	(1)
2022–2023	Lille	12	(0)
2023–2025	Brest	48	(1)
2025–	Boulogne	19	(0)

International career
2009	France U19	1	(0)
- * Club domestic league appearances and goals as of 12 May 2026

Jonas Serge Martin (born 9 April 1990) is a French professional footballer who plays as a midfielder for Ligue 2 club Boulogne.

== Club career ==
=== Montpellier ===
Born in Besançon, Martin was a Montpellier HSC youth graduate, In April 2011, he signed a new contract with the club until 2015. On 2 September 2011, he was loaned to Ligue 2 club Amiens SC for one year.

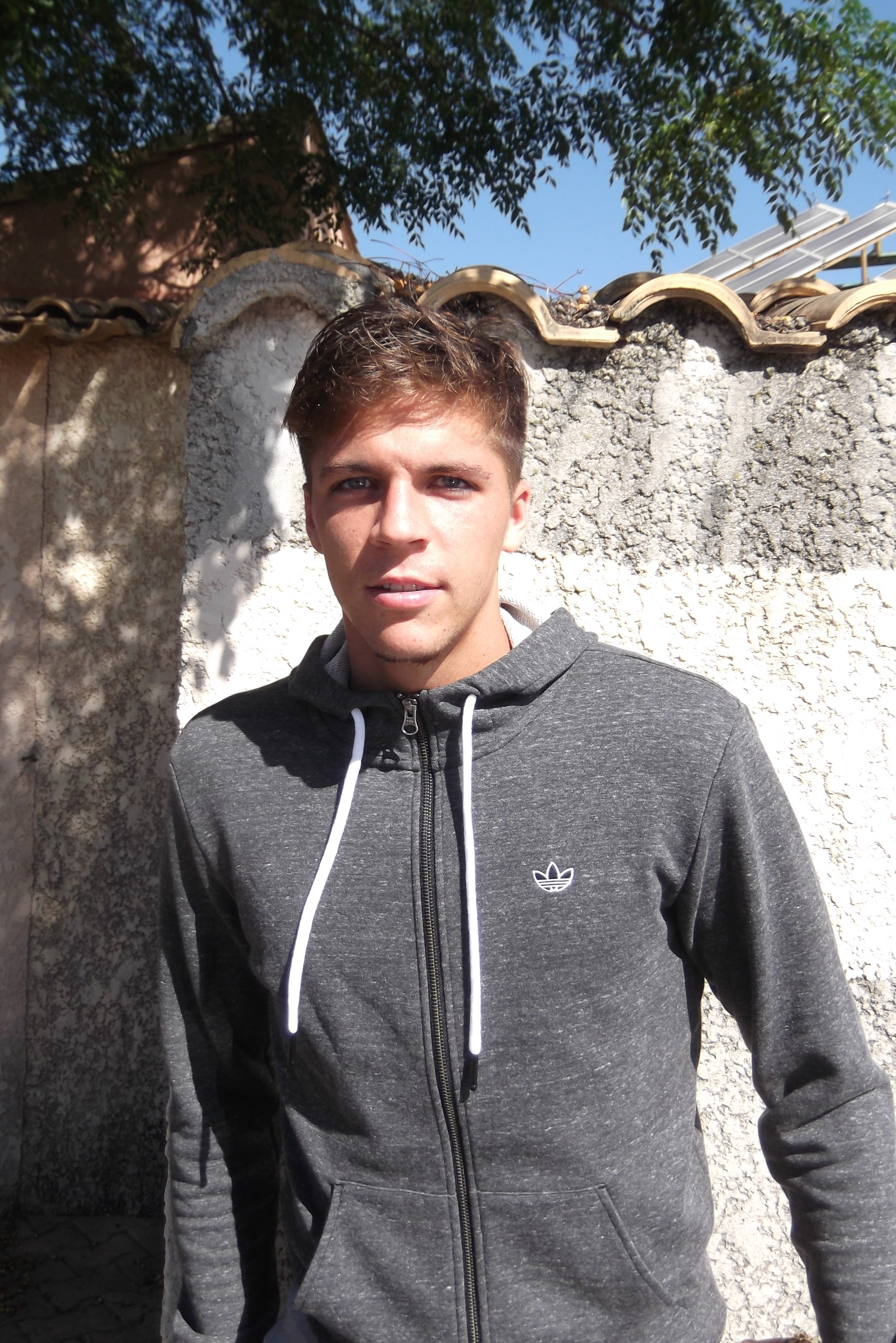
Martin in 2013

In May 2014, Martin extended his contract with Montpellier until 2017.

=== Betis ===
On 9 June 2016, Martin signed a three-year deal with La Liga side Real Betis.

=== Strasbourg ===
In 2017, Martin moved back to France, joining newly promoted RC Strasbourg.

=== Lille ===
In July 2022, Martin signed with Lille.

== Career statistics ==
As of match played 22 November 2024

Appearances and goals by club, season and competition
Club	Season	League			National cup (Note: Includes Coupe de France, Copa del Rey)		League cup (Note: Includes Coupe de la Ligue)		Continental		Total	
Club	Season	Division	Apps	Goals	Apps	Goals	Apps	Goals	Apps	Goals	Apps	Goals
Montpellier	2010–11	Ligue 1	5	1	0	0	0	0	0	0	5	1
Montpellier	2011–12	Ligue 1	—		—		1	0	—		1	0
Montpellier	2012–13	Ligue 1	16	0	1	0	2	0	1 (Note: Appearance(s) in UEFA Champions League)	0	20	0
Montpellier	2013–14	Ligue 1	20	0	1	0	1	1	—		22	1
Montpellier	2014–15	Ligue 1	30	1	1	0	0	0	—		31	1
Montpellier	2015–16	Ligue 1	36	4	1	0	0	0	—		37	4
Montpellier	Total		107	6	4	0	4	1	1	0	116	7
Amiens (loan)	2011–12	Ligue 1	26	3	1	0	—		—		27	3
Betis	2016–17	La Liga	20	2	2	0	—		—		22	2
Strasbourg	2017–18	Ligue 1	36	4	1	0	0	0	—		37	4
Strasbourg	2018–19	Ligue 1	23	3	3	1	0	0	—		26	4
Strasbourg	2019–20	Ligue 1	3	0	0	0	0	0	6 (Note: Appearances in UEFA Europa League)	1	9	1
Strasbourg	Total		62	7	4	1	0	0	6	1	72	9
Rennes	2019–20	Ligue 1	3	0	0	0	0	0	2	0	5	0
Rennes	2020–21	Ligue 1	12	0	1	0	—		1	0	14	0
Rennes	2021–22	Ligue 1	29	1	2	0	—		4 (Note: Appearances in UEFA Europa Conference League)	0	35	1
Rennes	Total		44	1	3	0	0	0	7	0	54	1
Lille	2022–23	Ligue 1	12	0	1	0	—		—		13	0
Brest	2023–24	Ligue 1	31	0	3	0	—		—		34	0
Brest	2024–25	Ligue 1	12	1	0	0	—		3	0	15	1
Brest	Total		43	1	3	0	—		3	0	49	1
Career total			314	20	18	1	4	1	17	1	353	23
