= Bingourou Kamara =

Footballer (born 1996)

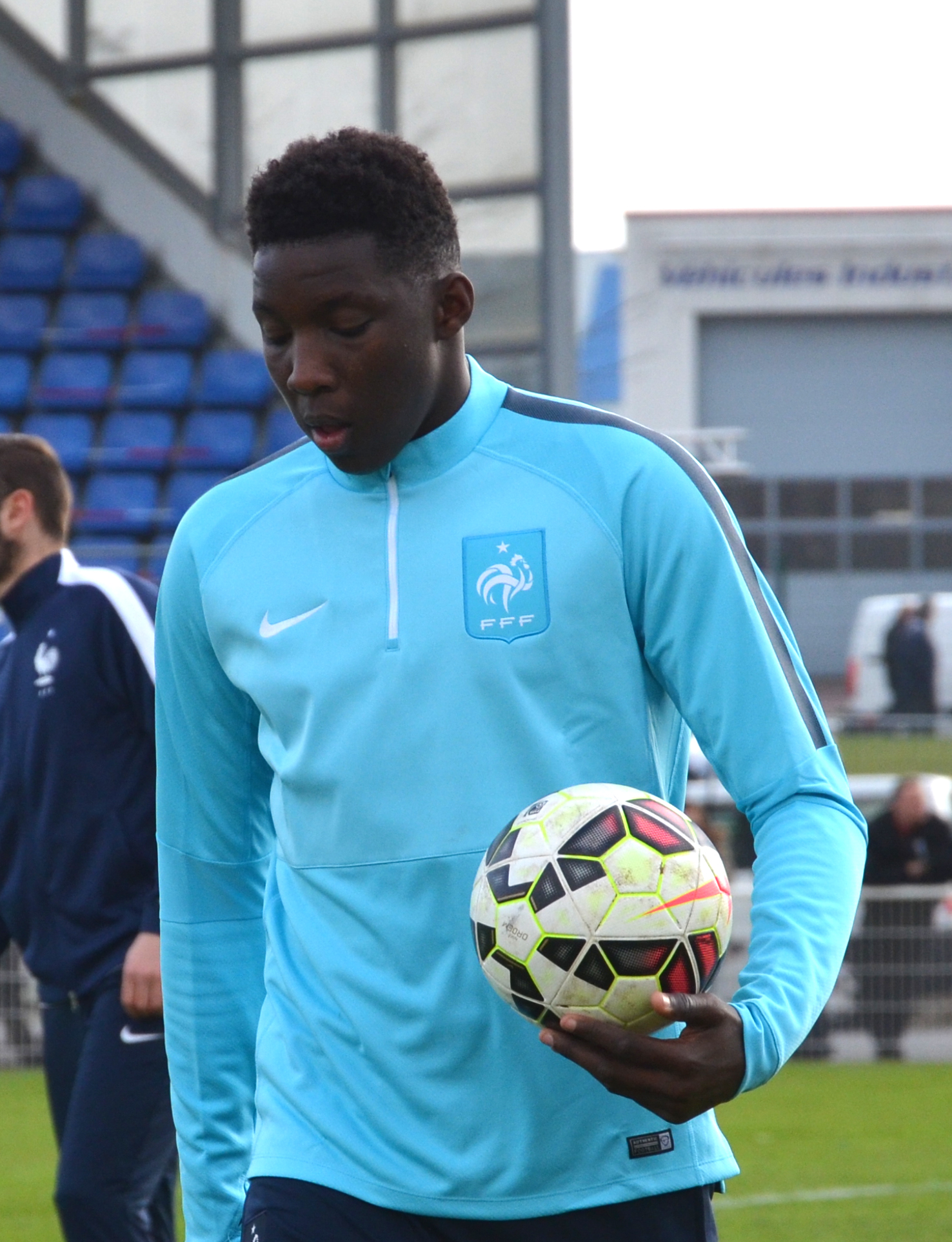
- Kamara with France U19 in 2015

Personal information
- Date of birth: 21 October 1996 (age 30)
- Place of birth: Longjumeau, France
- Height: 1.95 m (6 ft 5 in)
- Position: Goalkeeper

Team information
- Current team: Lorient
- Number: 21

Youth career
- 2002–2008: Sainte-Geneviève
- 2008–2012: Brétigny Foot
- 2012–2014: Tours

Senior career*
Years	Team	Apps	(Gls)
2014–2016	Tours B	7	(0)
2014–2017	Tours	81	(0)
2017–2022	Strasbourg	27	(0)
2022	→ Charleroi (loan)	9	(0)
2018–2020	Strasbourg B	11	(0)
2022–2023	Montpellier	5	(0)
2023–2025	Pau	65	(0)
2025–	Lorient	3	(0)

International career^{‡}
2015	France U19	3	(0)
2015–2016	France U20	4	(0)
2017	France U21	4	(0)
2020–	Senegal	2	(0)
- * Club domestic league appearances and goals as of 30 August 2025 ‡ National team caps and goals as of 06:01, 18 January 2022 (UTC)

Bingourou Kamara (21 October 1996) is a professional footballer who plays as a goalkeeper for Ligue 1 club Lorient. Born in France, he plays for the Senegal national team.

== Club career ==
=== Early life and training ===
After starting out with Sainte-Geneviève Sports, he joined Brétigny Foot CS, initially as a central defender. However, at the age of nine, Bingourou Kamara became a goalkeeper, taking advantage of an injury to the team's regular keeper. Bingourou Kamara then joined the Tours Football Club academy in 2012. He won the French U19 Championship in 2014 after saving two penalties in the final against Évian Thonon Gaillard.

=== Club career ===
==== Early career at Tours FC (2014–2017) ====
During the 2014–2015 season, he joined the professional squad as the third-choice goalkeeper. However, due to suspensions, injuries, and poor form of the goalkeepers above him in the hierarchy, he played his first match during the 13th matchday of Ligue 2 against Stade Lavallois, and subsequently became the first-choice goalkeeper for Tours.

==== RC Strasbourg (2017–2022) ====
Kamara signed a four-year contract with Racing Club de Strasbourg on 13 July 2017. He played his first official match as a starter on 5 August 2017, during the first matchday of the Ligue 1 season against Olympique Lyonnais.

During the 2018–2019 season, he played all the matches in the Coupe de la Ligue. He stood out in the final by making several decisive saves and stopping a penalty during the shootout, which his team ultimately won.

As the backup to Matz Sels, he did not play any league matches during the 2018-2019 and 2019–2020 seasons. Following the injury of the Belgian goalkeeper in July 2020, Kamara was promoted to first-choice goalkeeper in his absence for the start of the 2020–2021 season.

===== Loan to Sporting Charleroi (2021–2022) =====
During the first half of the 2021–2022 season, Kamara was not called up for any league matches, as Julien Stéphan preferred Matz Sels and Eiji Kawashima over him. On 23 December 2021, after his last league appearance on 6 November 2020 (a 1–0 loss against Olympique de Marseille), he was loaned out for six months without a purchase option to Royal Charleroi S.C.

Designated as the number 2 goalkeeper at his new club, Bingourou Kamara started as the first-choice goalkeeper in January, filling in for Hervé Koffi, who had left to play in the AFCON with Burkina Faso. During Koffi's absence, Kamara played four matches, achieving three clean sheets. Hervé Koffi returned on 15 February 2022, but due to a concussion sustained during the African competition, Kamara continued as the starting goalkeeper.

On 11 March 2022, Charleroi coach Edward Still clearly stated that Kamara was the second-choice goalkeeper and that Koffi would regain his starting position, which happened on 12 March 2022, for the 31st matchday of the league. Kamara played a total of nine matches in Belgium, from the 22nd to the 30th matchday, achieving four clean sheets and conceding 11 goals.

==== Montpellier HSC (2022–2023) ====
Upon his return to Strasbourg, Kamara's situation did not improve, as Robin Risser was even preferred over him as the third-choice goalkeeper. On 1 September 2022, Bingourou Kamara joined Montpellier Hérault Sport Club. He signed a one-year contract, becoming the second-choice goalkeeper behind Dimitry Bertaud, who was sidelined with a long-term ACL injury. Following an adductor injury and the suspension of Jonas Omlin, Kamara played five league matches out of the first fourteen. He did not reappear in the starting lineup for the rest of the season. On 30 June 2023, the Montpellier club announced the departure of seven players, including Kamara.

=== Pau FC ===
On 3 July 2023, Kamara joined Pau FC, marking a new chapter in his career as he replaced Alexandre Olliero and Massamba Ndiaye in the goalkeeper position.

Kamara made an immediate impact with his new team. He debuted in a Ligue 2 match against FC Girondins de Bordeaux on 6 August 2023, helping Pau FC secure a 3–0 victory. His performances throughout the season have been marked by consistent reliability, contributing to Pau's strong campaign in Ligue 2. As of the end of the 2023–24 season, Kamara has made 36 appearances for Pau FC, showcasing his skills and solidifying his position as a key player for the team. His ability to command the penalty area and make crucial saves has earned him praise from fans and analysts alike.

Kamara became the team's captain at the start of the 2024–25 season.

=== Lorient ===
On 25 July 2025, Kamara signed a two-season contract with Lorient in Ligue 1.

== International career ==
Born in France, Kamara is of Mauritanian and Senegalese descent. He was a youth international for France. He switched sporting nationalities, first representing Senegal in a 3–1 friendly loss to Morocco on 9 October 2020.

== Career statistics ==
=== Club ===
As of match played 20 December 2025

Appearances and goals by club, season and competition
Club	Season	League			National cup		League cup		Other		Total	
Club	Season	Division	Apps	Goals	Apps	Goals	Apps	Goals	Apps	Goals	Apps	Goals
Tours B	2013–14	CFA 2	2	0	—		—		—		2	0
Tours B	2014–15	CFA 2	3	0	—		—		—		3	0
Tours B	2015–16	CFA 2	1	0	—		—		—		1	0
Tours B	2016–17	CFA 2	1	0	—		—		—		1	0
Tours B	Total		7	0	—		—		—		7	0
Tours	2014–15	Ligue 2	26	0	3	0	0	0	—		29	0
Tours	2015–16	Ligue 2	30	0	0	0	0	0	—		30	0
Tours	2016–17	Ligue 2	25	0	0	0	1	0	—		26	0
Tours	Total		81	0	3	0	1	0	—		85	0
Strasbourg	2017–18	Ligue 1	19	0	2	0	0	0	—		21	0
Strasbourg	2018–19	Ligue 1	0	0	1	0	5	0	—		6	0
Strasbourg	2019–20	Ligue 1	0	0	1	0	2	0	—		3	0
Strasbourg	2020–21	Ligue 1	8	0	1	0	—		—		9	0
Strasbourg	Total		27	0	5	0	7	0	—		39	0
Strasbourg B	2017–18	National 3	1	0	—		—		—		1	0
Strasbourg B	2018–19	National 3	6	0	—		—		—		6	0
Strasbourg B	2019–20	National 3	4	0	—		—		—		1	0
Strasbourg B	Total		11	0	—		—		—		11	0
Charleroi (loan)	2021–22	Belgian First Division A	9	0	0	0	—		0	0	9	0
Montpellier	2022–23	Ligue 1	5	0	1	0	—		—		6	0
Pau	2023–24	Ligue 2	36	0	0	0	—		—		36	0
Pau	2024–25	Ligue 2	29	0	0	0	—		—		29	0
Pau	Total		65	0	0	0	—		—		65	0
Lorient	2025–26	Ligue 1	3	0	1	0	—		—		4	0
Career total			208	0	10	0	8	0	0	0	226	0

=== International ===
As of match played 26 March 2021

Appearances and goals by national team and year
National team	Year	Apps	Goals
Senegal	2020	1	0
Senegal	2021	1	0
Senegal	2022	0	0
Total		2	0

== Honours ==
Strasbourg

- Coupe de la Ligue: 2018–19
