= Kévin Zohi =

Ivorian-Malian footballer

Personal information
- Full name: Kévin Lucien Zohi
- Date of birth: 18 August 1997 (age 29)
- Place of birth: Lopou, Ivory Coast
- Height: 1.77 m (5 ft 10 in)
- Position: Winger

Team information
- Current team: Académica de Coimbra (on loan from Torreense)
- Number: 8

Youth career
- 2010–2015: JMG Academy
- 2015–2016: AS Real Bamako

Senior career*
Years	Team	Apps	(Gls)
2017–2019	Strasbourg II	30	(16)
2018–2021	Strasbourg	61	(4)
2021–2023	Vizela	50	(2)
2023–2024	Sochaux	30	(8)
2024–2025	Laval	29	(1)
2025–	Torreense	34	(5)
2026–	→ Académica de Coimbra (loan)	1	(0)

International career
2020	Mali	1	(0)
- * Club domestic league appearances and goals as of 11 September 2026

Kévin Lucien Zohi (born 19 December 1996) is a professional footballer who plays as a forward for Liga Portugal 2 club Académica de Coimbra on loan from Torreense. Born in Ivory Coast, he played for the Mali national team.

== Club career ==
Zohi began playing football on the streets at the age of 5, and at the age of 13 moved to the JMG Academy in Mali. In 2015, he moved to the Malian club AS Real Bamako where he successfully began training with the seniors. In the winter of 2016 Zohi trialed with Nice, before joining Strasbourg in January 2017. He made his professional debut with Strasbourg in a 0–0 Ligue 1 tie with Montpellier on 23 February 2018. Zohi scored his first professional goal on 27 October 2018 in a 1–1 draw against Guingamp.

On 23 July 2021, Zohi joined Vizela in Portugal on a three-year contract.

On 1 September 2023, Zohi returned to France, signing a one-year contract with Sochaux, who had recently suffered administrative relegation to the French third division.

On 2 August 2025, Zohi returned to Portugal and signed with Torreense.

== International career ==
Zohi debuted with the senior Mali national team in a 3–0 friendly win over Ghana on 9 October 2020.

== Career statistics ==
=== Club ===
As of match played 29 August 2025

Appearances and goals by club, season and competition
Club	Season	League			National cup (Note: Includes Coupe de France, Taça de Portugal)		League cup (Note: Includes Coupe de la Ligue, Taça da Liga)		Europe		Total	
Club	Season	Division	Apps	Goals	Apps	Goals	Apps	Goals	Apps	Goals	Apps	Goals
Strasbourg II	2016–17	National 3	14	8	—		—		—		14	8
Strasbourg II	2017–18	National 3	10	5	—		—		—		10	5
Strasbourg II	2018–19	National 3	5	1	—		—		—		5	1
Strasbourg II	2019–20	National 3	1	2	—		—		—		1	2
Strasbourg II	Total		30	16	—		—		—		30	16
Strasbourg	2017–18	Ligue 1	1	0	0	0	0	0	—		1	0
Strasbourg	2018–19	Ligue 1	20	1	2	1	4	0	5 (Note: Appearances in UEFA Europa League)	2	31	4
Strasbourg	2019–20	Ligue 1	17	1	3	3	2	0	—		22	4
Strasbourg	2020–21	Ligue 1	23	2	0	0	—		—		23	2
Strasbourg	Total		61	4	5	4	6	2	—		77	10
Vizela	2021–22	Primeira Liga	25	0	2	0	0	0	—		27	0
Vizela	2022–23	Primeira Liga	25	2	2	1	3	0	—		30	3
Vizela	2023–24	Primeira Liga	0	0	0	0	0	0	—		0	0
Vizela	Total		50	2	4	1	3	0	—		57	3
Sochaux	2023–24	CFA	30	8	4	0	—		—		34	8
Laval	2024–25	Ligue 2	29	1	4	0	—		—		33	1
Torreense	2025–26	Liga Portugal 2	3	0	0	0	—		—		3	0
Career total			203	31	17	5	9	0	5	2	234	38

=== International ===
Appearances and goals by national team and year
National team	Year	Apps	Goals
Mali	2020	1	0
Total		1	0

== Honours ==
Torreense

- Taça de Portugal: 2025–26
