= Ibrahima Sissoko =

Malian footballer (born 1997)

Personal information
- Date of birth: 27 October 1997 (age 29)
- Place of birth: Meaux, France
- Height: 1.93 m (6 ft 4 in)
- Position: Defensive midfielder

Team information
- Current team: Nantes
- Number: 28

Youth career
- 2006–2013: CS Meaux
- 2013–2014: US Torcy
- 2014–2015: Brest

Senior career*
Years	Team	Apps	(Gls)
2015–2018	Brest II	33	(3)
2016–2018	Brest	27	(2)
2018–2024	Strasbourg	179	(5)
2024–2026	VfL Bochum	38	(5)
2026–	Nantes	11	(0)

International career^{‡}
2015	France U18	3	(0)
2015–2016	France U19	7	(1)
2016–2017	France U20	4	(0)
2018–2019	France U21	4	(0)
2023–	Mali	4	(0)
- * Club domestic league appearances and goals as of 2 May 2026 ‡ National team caps and goals as of 22:45, 3 January 2026 (UTC)

Ibrahima Sissoko (born 27 October 1997) is a professional footballer who plays as a defensive midfielder for Ligue 2 club Nantes. Born in France, he plays for the Mali national team.

== Club career ==
Sissoko started his senior career at Brest in Ligue 2. On 8 December 2017, he scored his first goal in a 3–0 victory over Bourg-Péronnas. In June 2018, he joined Ligue 1 club Strasbourg. He netted a goal on his debut in a 2–0 away win over Bordeaux.

On 24 June 2024, Sissoko signed a three-year contract with VfL Bochum in Germany. In the 2024–25 season, he recorded the most duels won in the Bundesliga, with a total of 388.

On 12 January 2026, Sissoko returned to France and signed a two-and-a-half-year contract with Nantes.

== International career ==
Born in France, Sissoko is of Malian descent. He was a youth international for France, having played up to the France U21s. He was called up to the Mali national team for a set of friendlies in October 2023.

On 11 December 2025, Sissoko was called up to the Mali squad for the 2025 Africa Cup of Nations.

== Career statistics ==
=== Club ===
As of match played 2 May 2026

Appearances and goals by club, season and competition
Club	Season	League			National cup		League cup		Europe		Other		Total	
Club	Season	Division	Apps	Goals	Apps	Goals	Apps	Goals	Apps	Goals	Apps	Goals	Apps	Goals
Brest B	2014–15	Championnat National 3	8	0	—		—		—		—		8	0
Brest B	2015–16	Championnat National 3	11	2	—		—		—		—		11	2
Brest B	2016–17	Championnat National 3	13	1	—		—		—		—		13	1
Brest B	2017–18	Championnat National 3	1	0	—		—		—		—		1	0
Brest B	Total		33	3	—		—		—		—		33	3
Brest	2015–16	Ligue 2	2	0	1	0	—		—		—		3	0
Brest	2016–17	Ligue 2	6	0	2	0	—		—		—		8	0
Brest	2017–18	Ligue 2	19	1	1	0	1	0	—		—		21	1
Brest	Total		27	1	4	0	1	0	—		—		32	1
Strasbourg	2018–19	Ligue 1	32	3	0	0	3	0	—		—		35	3
Strasbourg	2019–20	Ligue 1	23	0	3	0	2	0	4 (Note: Appearance(s) in UEFA Europa League)	0	—		32	0
Strasbourg	2020–21	Ligue 1	36	0	1	0	—		—		—		37	0
Strasbourg	2021–22	Ligue 1	35	2	1	0	—		—		—		36	2
Strasbourg	2022–23	Ligue 1	26	0	1	0	—		—		—		27	2
Strasbourg	2023–24	Ligue 1	27	0	2	0	—		—		—		29	0
Strasbourg	Total		179	5	8	0	5	0	4	0	0	0	196	5
VfL Bochum	2024–25	Bundesliga	32	2	1	0	—		—		—		33	2
VfL Bochum	2025–26	2. Bundesliga	5	3	2	0	—		—		—		7	3
VfL Bochum	Total		37	5	3	0	—		—		—		40	5
Nantes	2025–26	Ligue 1	11	0	—		—		—		11	0		
Career total			287	14	15	0	6	0	4	0	0	0	312	14

=== International ===
As of match played 3 January 2026

Appearances and goals by national team and year
National team	Year	Apps	Goals
Mali	2023	1	0
Mali	2024	1	0
Mali	2025	1	0
Mali	2026	1	0
Total		4	0
