= Kenny Lala =

Martiniquais footballer (born 1991)

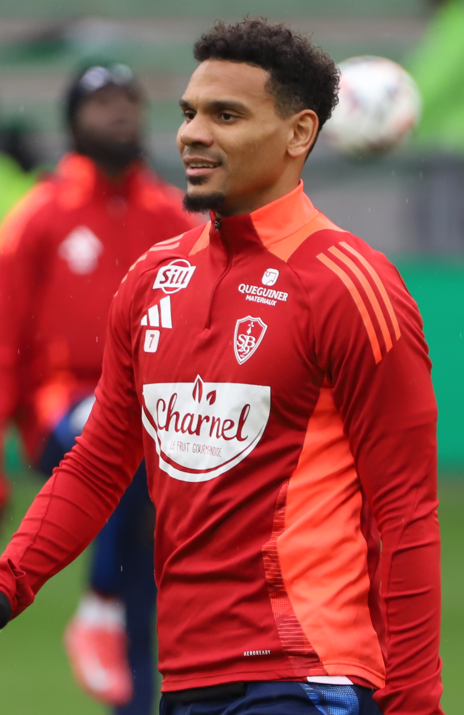
- Lala with Brest in 2025

Personal information
- Date of birth: 3 October 1991 (age 35)
- Place of birth: Villepinte, France
- Height: 1.78 m (5 ft 10 in)
- Position: Right-back

Team information
- Current team: Brest
- Number: 77

Youth career
- 2004–2008: ES Parisienne
- 2008–2010: Paris FC

Senior career*
Years	Team	Apps	(Gls)
2010–2011	Paris FC	33	(0)
2011–2015	Valenciennes B	29	(0)
2011–2015	Valenciennes	61	(1)
2015–2017	Lens	71	(2)
2017–2021	Strasbourg	111	(13)
2021–2022	Olympiacos	31	(0)
2023–	Brest	119	(6)

International career^{‡}
2026–	Martinique	3	(0)
- * Club domestic league appearances and goals as of 22:37, 22 October 2026 (UTC) ‡ National team caps and goals as of 21:25, 3 October 2026 (UTC)

Kenny Lala (born 3 October 1991) is a professional footballer who plays as a right-back for Ligue 1 club Brest. Born in France, he plays for the Martinique national team.

== Club career ==
Lala began his career with local amateur club ES Parisienne before signing with semi-professional club Paris at the age of 17. Prior to signing with the club, Lala had trials with professional clubs Lille, Caen, and Valenciennes. After two seasons playing on Paris' reserve team, he was promoted to the club's senior team for the 2010–11 season. A successful campaign, in which Lala made 33 league appearances, resulted in the player being linked to several Ligue 1 clubs, most notably Valenciennes who offered Paris €100,000 for his services.

Despite declining the initial offer, on 15 June 2011, Paris reached an agreement with Valenciennes on a transfer for Lala. He signed a four-year contract with the Northern outfit. Lala was assigned the number 18 shirt by manager Daniel Sanchez and was placed onto the club's first team, though he has played on the club's reserve team in the Championnat de France amateur. Lala made his professional debut on 6 November 2011 in a 1–1 draw with Rennes appearing as a substitute.

On 30 June 2015, he signed a three-year contract with Lens. In June 2017, Lala joined Strasbourg on a two-year contract. In his time at the club, he was a regular starter.

On 1 February 2021, the last day of the 2020–21 winter transfer window, Lala moved to Super League Greece club Olympiacos. In October 2022, he terminated his contract with the club after being unable to make a single appearance in the 2022–23 season.

In January 2023, he joined French side Brest on a free transfer, and in July that year, he extended his contract with the club until 2025. On 13 August 2023, he scored his first goal in a 3–2 win over his former club Lens on the opening matchday of the 2023–24 season. On 19 May 2024, he scored the last goal in a 3–0 away win over Toulouse on the final matchday of the season, helping his club to secure a third-place finish in the league and first ever qualification to the UEFA Champions League.

== International career ==
Born in France, Lala is of Martiniquais and Malagasy descent. In early March 2024, Lala was called up by the Madagascar national team.

== Personal life ==
Lala was born in Villepinte and grew up in the 18th arrondissement of Paris near the Porte de Clignancourt. He has two sisters. Lala's mother previously worked as a saleswoman for Zara and was also his sports agent having handled the player's four-year fédérale contract he signed with Paris FC. She now works for the public management and construction company l'Opac de Paris.

== Career statistics ==
=== Club ===
As of match played on 17 October 2026

Appearances and goals by club, season and competition
Club	Season	League			National cup (Note: Includes Coupe de France, Greek Cup)		League cup (Note: Includes Coupe de la Ligue)		Continental		Other		Total	
Club	Season	Division	Apps	Goals	Apps	Goals	Apps	Goals	Apps	Goals	Apps	Goals	Apps	Goals
Paris FC	2010–11	Championnat National	33	0	2	0	—		—		—		35	0
Valenciennes	2011–12	Ligue 1	2	0	0	0	0	0	—		—		2	0
Valenciennes	2012–13	Ligue 1	7	1	0	0	0	0	—		—		7	1
Valenciennes	2013–14	Ligue 1	17	0	1	0	0	0	—		—		18	0
Valenciennes	2014–15	Ligue 2	35	0	2	0	0	0	—		—		37	0
Valenciennes	Total		61	1	3	0	0	0	—		—		64	0
Lens	2015–16	Ligue 2	33	1	0	0	1	0	—		—		34	1
Lens	2016–17	Ligue 2	37	1	2	0	1	0	—		—		40	1
Lens	Total		70	2	2	0	2	0	—		—		74	2
Strasbourg	2017–18	Ligue 1	31	3	4	0	2	0	—		—		37	3
Strasbourg	2018–19	Ligue 1	34	5	1	0	5	0	—		—		40	5
Strasbourg	2019–20	Ligue 1	25	2	2	0	2	0	4 (Note: Appearances in UEFA Europa League)	0	—		33	2
Strasbourg	2020–21	Ligue 1	21	3	0	0	—		—		—		21	3
Strasbourg	Total		111	13	7	0	9	0	4	0	—		131	13
Olympiacos	2020–21	Super League Greece	5	0	2	0	—		4	0	—		11	0
Olympiacos	2021–22	Super League Greece	26	0	2	0	—		12 (Note: Three appearances in UEFA Champions League, nine appearances in UEFA Europa League)	0	—		40	0
Olympiacos	Total		31	0	4	0	—		16	0	—		51	0
Brest	2022–23	Ligue 1	17	0	2	0	—		—		—		19	0
Brest	2023–24	Ligue 1	33	2	3	1	—		—		—		36	3
Brest	2024–25	Ligue 1	30	3	2	0	—		8 (Note: Appearances in UEFA Champions League)	0	—		40	3
Brest	2025–26	Ligue 1	32	0	1	0	—		—		—		33	0
Brest	2026–27	Ligue 1	7	1	0	0	—		—		—		7	1
Brest	Total		119	6	8	1	—		8	0	—		135	7
Career total			425	22	26	1	11	0	28	0	0	0	490	22

=== International ===
As of match played 3 October 2026

Appearances and goals by national team and year
National team	Year	Apps	Goals
Martinique	2026	3	0
Total		3	0

== Honours ==
Strasbourg

- Coupe de la Ligue: 2018–19

Olympiacos

- Super League Greece: 2020–21, 2021–22

Individual

- UNFP Ligue 1 Player of the Month: December 2018
- UNFP Ligue 1 Team of the Year: 2018–19
