= Idriss Saadi =

Footballer (born 1992)

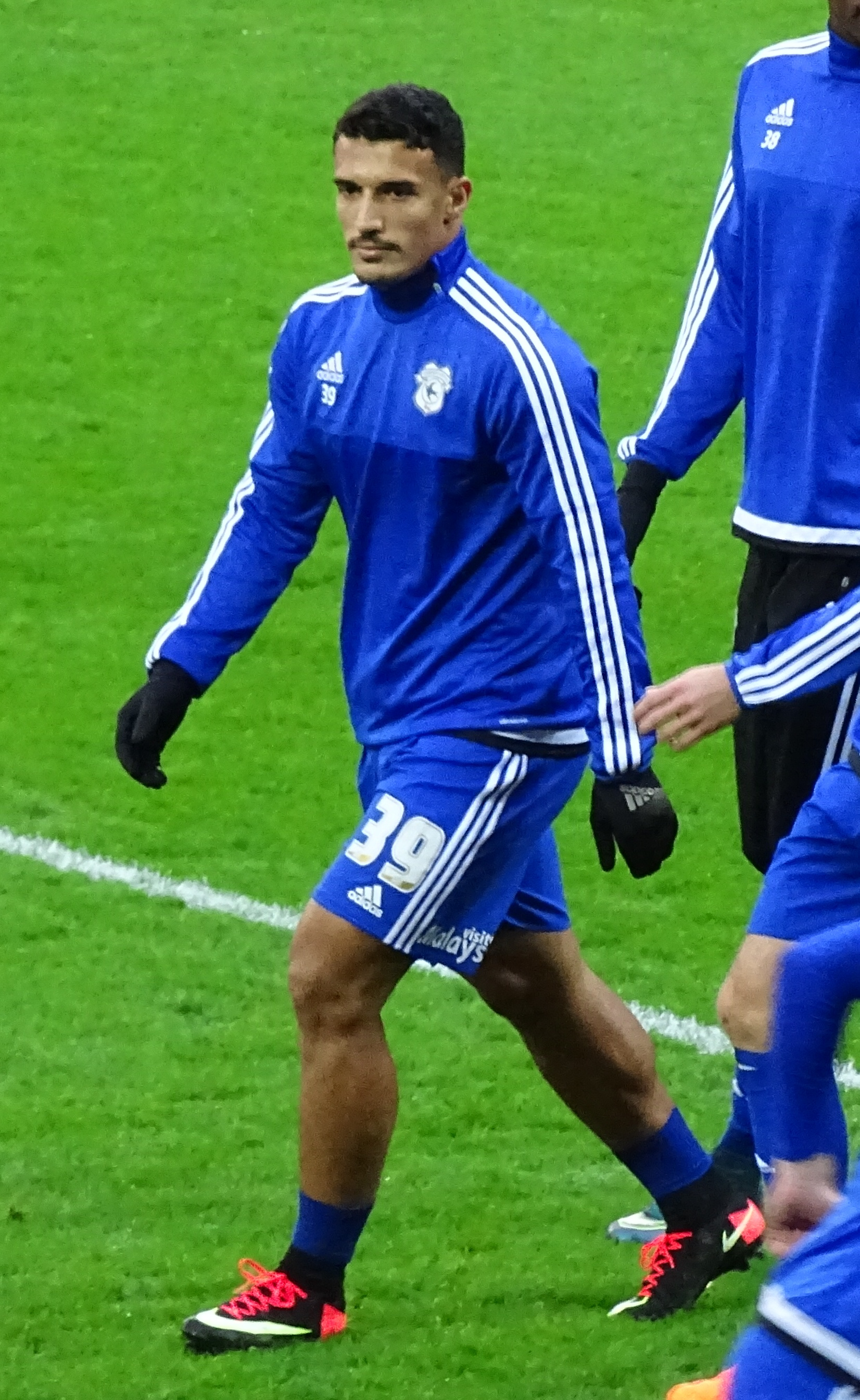
- Saadi with Cardiff City in 2015

Personal information
- Date of birth: 8 February 1992 (age 34)
- Place of birth: Valence, France
- Height: 1.85 m (6 ft 1 in)
- Position: Forward

Youth career
- 2000–2004: Chabeuillois
- 2004–2005: Arménienne Valence
- 2005–2006: Valence
- 2006–2010: Saint-Étienne

Senior career*
Years	Team	Apps	(Gls)
2010–2014	Saint-Étienne B	29	(20)
2010–2014	Saint-Étienne	18	(0)
2012	→ Reims (loan)	10	(1)
2012–2013	→ Gazélec Ajaccio (loan)	32	(7)
2014–2015	Clermont	39	(18)
2015–2017	Cardiff City	2	(0)
2016–2017	→ Kortrijk (loan)	32	(14)
2017–2021	Strasbourg	34	(4)
2019–2020	→ Cercle Brugge (loan)	16	(3)
2018	Strasbourg B	2	(1)
2021–2022	Bastia	13	(2)
2022	CR Belouizdad	4	(0)
2023–2025	Andrézieux	20	(5)
Total		251	(75)

International career
2007–2008	France U16	4	(1)
2008–2009	France U17	5	(3)
2010	France U18	1	(0)
2010–2011	France U19	3	(1)
2017	Algeria	2	(0)
- * Club domestic league appearances and goals

Idriss Saadi (Arabic: إدريس سعدي; born 8 February 1992) is a former professional footballer who played as a striker. Born in France, he played for the Algeria national team.

== Club career ==
=== Saint-Étienne ===
Saadi started his professional career at Saint-Étienne, making his professional debut on 28 August 2010 in a league match against Lens in a 3–1 victory.

During his time at Saint-Étienne, Saadi had loan spells at Reims and Ajaccio.

=== Clermont Foot ===
In January 2014, Saadi joined Ligue 2 side Clermont, where he impressed with 20 goals in 42 games.

=== Cardiff City ===
On 31 August 2015, Saadi joined Championship side Cardiff City for an undisclosed fee. Manager Russell Slade stated that the club had been scouting Saadi for several months and described him as strong, powerful and technically good. Due to an injury picked up the previous season, Saadi didn't make his debut till 7 November 2015, in a 2–0 win over Reading, where he had lasted 13 minutes before suffering another injury ruling him out for another 6 weeks. He made just one more substitute appearance during his first season at the Cardiff City Stadium, during a 2–1 defeat to Fulham on 9 April.

==== Loan to Kortrijk ====
In July 2016, Saadi joined Belgian side Kortrijk on loan. He made his debut in a 1–1 draw with Gent and went on to score his first and second goal against Club Brugge on 20 August.

=== Strasbourg ===
On 21 July 2017, Saadi joined Strasbourg for an undisclosed fee.

=== CR Belouizdad ===
On 5 July 2022, Saadi joined CR Belouizdad.

=== Retirement ===
On 1 January 2025, Saadi announced his retirement.

== International career ==
Saadi is a former youth international for France. He debuted for the Algeria national football team in a friendly 1–0 win over Guinea on 6 June 2017.

== Career statistics ==
=== Club ===
As of match played 1 July 2019

Appearances and goals by club, season and competition
Club	Season	League			National Cup		League Cup		Other		Total	
Club	Season	Division	Apps	Goals	Apps	Goals	Apps	Goals	Apps	Goals	Apps	Goals
Saint-Étienne	2010–11	Ligue 1	9	0	3	0	1	0	—		13	0
Saint-Étienne	2011–12	Ligue 1	7	0	1	0	1	0	—		9	0
Saint-Étienne	2012–13	Ligue 1	1	0	0	0	0	0	—		1	0
Saint-Étienne	2013–14	Ligue 1	1	0	0	0	0	0	1 (Note: Appearance in the UEFA Europa League)	0	2	0
Saint-Étienne	Total		18	0	4	0	2	0	1	0	25	0
Reims (loan)	2011–12	Ligue 2	10	1	0	0	0	0	—		10	1
Ajaccio (loan)	2012–13	Ligue 2	32	7	0	0	0	0	—		32	7
Clermont	2013–14	Ligue 2	18	7	0	0	0	0	—		18	7
Clermont	2014–15	Ligue 2	21	11	2	1	0	0	—		23	12
Clermont	Total		39	18	2	1	0	0	0	0	41	19
Cardiff City	2015–16	Championship	2	0	0	0	0	0	—		2	0
Kortrijk (loan)	2016–17	First Division A	29	14	2	0	—		8 (Note: Appearances in the Belgian First Division A European play-offs)	2	39	16
Strasbourg	2017–18	Ligue 1	26	4	2	1	1	0	—		29	5
Strasbourg	2018–19	Ligue 1	1	0	0	0	0	0	—		1	0
Strasbourg	Total		27	4	2	1	1	0	0	0	30	5
Career total			157	44	10	2	3	0	9	2	179	48
