= Ivann Botella =

French footballer (born 1999)

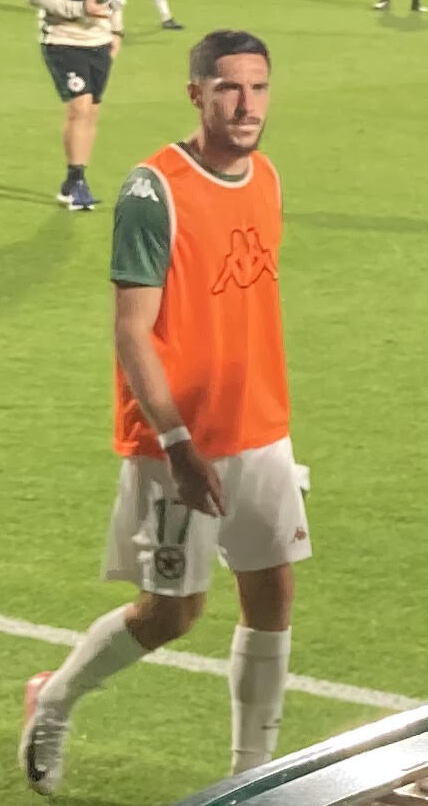
- Botella with Red Star in 2024

Personal information
- Date of birth: 28 June 1999 (age 27)
- Place of birth: Libourne, France
- Height: 1.81 m (5 ft 11 in)
- Position: Forward

Team information
- Current team: Caen
- Number: 19

Youth career
- Trélissac

Senior career*
| Years | Team | Apps | (Gls) |
| 2017 | Trélissac | 2 | (0) |
| 2017–2020 | Strasbourg B | 47 | (25) |
| 2020–2021 | SC Lyon | 29 | (8) |
| 2020 | SC Lyon B | 1 | (2) |
| 2021–2023 | RWD Molenbeek | 31 | (4) |
| 2023–2025 | Red Star | 41 | (8) |
| 2025 | → RAAL La Louvière (loan) | 10 | (3) |
| 2025– | Caen | 30 | (10) |
- * Club domestic league appearances and goals as of 23 June 2026

Ivann Botella (born 28 June 1999) is a French professional footballer who plays as a forward for Ligue 3 club Caen.

== Career ==
A youth product of Trélissac, Botella joined Strasbourg in 2017. His performances with the reserve team earned him call-ups to the first team, but he never made a professional appearance for the club. He left Strasbourg in 2020 for SC Lyon, where he played one season in which he contributed eight goals and three assists in twenty-nine games. In 2021, Botella joined Belgian club RWD Molenbeek (RWDM). In the 2022–23 season, he contributed four goals and six assists as RWDM won the Challenger Pro League.

On 22 June 2023, Botella returned to France, signing for Championnat National club Red Star. He won the league in his first season at the club. In the first half of the 2024–25 season, Botella made eight Ligue 2 appearances for Red Star before returning to Belgium on loan with RAAL La Louvière.

On 22 July 2025, Botella signed for Caen, being transferred from Red Star.

== Personal life ==
Born in France, Botella is of Spanish descent.

== Honours ==
RWD Molenbeek

- Challenger Pro League: 2022–23

Red Star

- Championnat National: 2023–24
