= Moataz Zemzemi =

Tunisian footballer (born 1999)

Personal information
- Full name: Moataz Zemzemi
- Date of birth: 7 August 1999 (age 27)
- Place of birth: Tunis, Tunisia
- Height: 1.86 m (6 ft 1 in)
- Position: Midfielder

Team information
- Current team: CSKA 1948
- Number: 8

Youth career
- Club Africain

Senior career*
Years	Team	Apps	(Gls)
2016–2017	Club Africain	16	(3)
2018–2021	Strasbourg B	23	(7)
2018–2021	Strasbourg	3	(0)
2020	→ Club Africain (loan)	3	(0)
2020–2021	→ Avranches (loan)	23	(2)
2020	→ Avranches B (loan)	1	(0)
2021–2024	Niort	88	(9)
2024–2026	Club Africain	53	(1)
2026–	CSKA 1948	8	(0)

International career^{‡}
2019–	Tunisia	1	(0)
- * Club domestic league appearances and goals as of 18 November 2026 ‡ National team caps and goals as of 22:10, 27 August 2021 (UTC)

Moataz Zemzemi (Arabic: معتز زمزمي; born 7 August 1999) is a Tunisian professional footballer who plays as a midfielder for Bulgarian First League club CSKA 1948 Sofia and the Tunisia national team.

== Club career ==
Zemzemi started his career with Tunisian side Club Africain. In January 2018, he transferred for Ligue 1 side Strasbourg for a fee of €200,000, signing a three-and-a-half-year contract, being described by the club as "one for the future". After playing with the B in Championnat National 3 for the second half of the 2017–18 season, he made his first team debut on 19 August 2018, in the Ligue 1 fixture against Saint-Étienne, coming on as a late substitute.

Zemzemi hit the media spotlight after his involvement in a challenge which left Neymar injured during a Coupe de France match between Strasbourg and Paris Saint-Germain in January 2019.

In January 2020, having failed to break through to the first team, Zemzemi was loaned back to his former club, Club Africain, until the end of the 2019–20 season. He returned to Strasbourg in July 2020, with the season still paused due to the COVID-19 pandemic, having played just three matches. In August 2020, Zemzemi joined Championnat National side Avranches on loan for the 2020–21 season.

On 5 August 2021, Zemzemi signed for Ligue 2 club Niort. On 20 July 2024, he returned to Club Africain.

On 1 July 2026, Zemzemi signed a contract with Bulgarian First League club CSKA 1948 Sofia.

== International career ==
He made his debut for Tunisia national team on 7 June 2019 in a friendly against Iraq, as an 86th-minute substitute for Ali Maâloul.

== Career statistics ==
=== Club ===
As of matches played 1 February 2022.

Appearances and goals by club, season and competition
Club	Season	Division	League		National Cup		Total	
Club	Season	Division	Apps	Goals	Apps	Goals	Apps	Goals
Club Africain	2015–16	Ligue 1	4	1	0	0	4	1
Club Africain	2016–17	Ligue 1	2	1	0	0	2	1
Club Africain	2017–18	Ligue 1	10	1	0	0	10	1
Club Africain	Total		16	3	0	0	16	3
Strasbourg	2017–18	Ligue 1	0	0	0	0	0	0
Strasbourg	2018–19	Ligue 1	2	0	2	0	4	0
Strasbourg	2019–20	Ligue 1	1	0	0	0	1	0
Strasbourg	Total		3	0	2	0	5	0
Club Africain (loan)	2019–20	Ligue 1	3	0	0	0	3	0
Avranches (loan)	2020–21	National	23	2	0	0	23	2
Chamois Niortais	2021–22	Ligue 2	18	2	— (Note: Niort excluded from the 2021–22 Coupe de France)		18	2
Career total			63	7	2	0	65	7
