= Lamine Koné =

French footballer (born 1989)

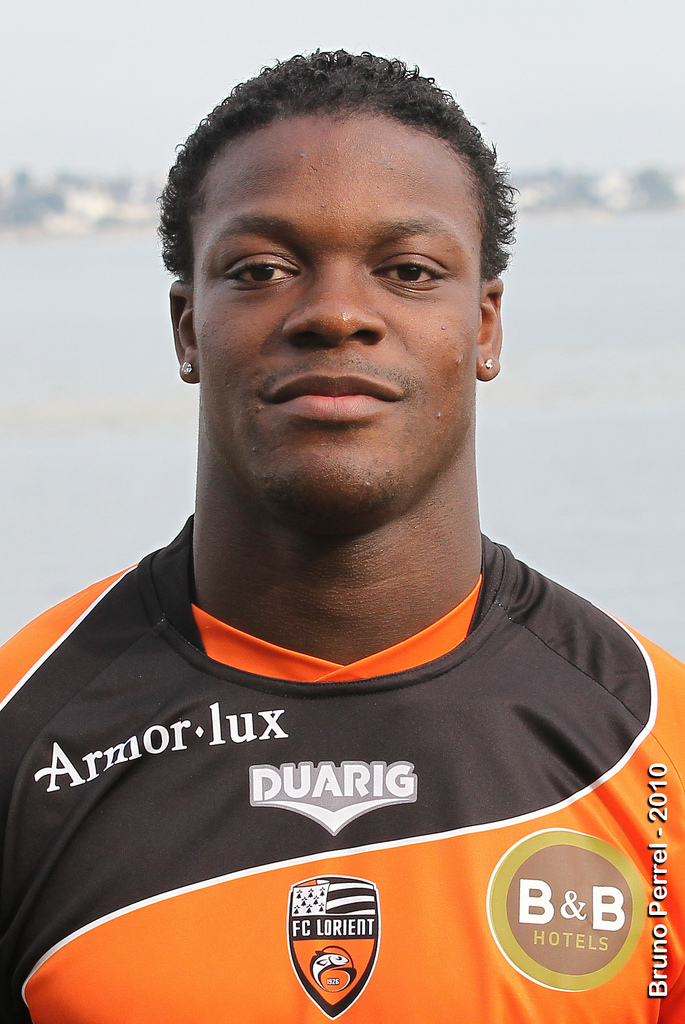
- Koné in 2010

Personal information
- Full name: Lamine-Gueye Koné
- Date of birth: 1 February 1989 (age 37)
- Place of birth: Paris, France
- Height: 1.86 m (6 ft 1 in)
- Position: Centre-back

Youth career
- 1998–2002: SO Paris
- 2002–2003: US Alfortville
- 2003–2006: Châteauroux

Senior career*
Years	Team	Apps	(Gls)
2006–2010	Châteauroux	74	(4)
2010–2016	Lorient	126	(7)
2010–2015	Lorient B	12	(0)
2016–2019	Sunderland	69	(3)
2018–2019	→ Strasbourg (loan)	32	(1)
2019–2021	Strasbourg	33	(2)
2021–2022	Lausanne-Sport	7	(0)
2023	Le Mans	5	(0)

International career^{‡}
2005–2006	France U17	5	(0)
2006–2007	France U18	6	(0)
2007–2008	France U19	5	(0)
2009–2010	France U20	8	(0)
2014–	Ivory Coast	9	(0)
- * Club domestic league appearances and goals as of 27 March 2023 ‡ National team caps and goals as of 09:07, 29 July 2019 (UTC)

Lamine-Gueye Koné (born 1 February 1989), known as Lamine Koné, is a professional footballer who plays as a centre-back. Born in France, he plays for the Ivory Coast national team.

== Club career ==
=== Early career ===
Koné began his career with local youth clubs in the Île-de-France region. In 2003, he joined the second division club LB Châteauroux and, after three years in the club's youth academy, was promoted to the senior team for the 2005–06 season. Koné made his professional debut on 27 April 2007 in a league match against Montpellier. He spent three more years at the club amassing over 70 appearances.

=== Lorient ===
On 30 July 2010, Koné joined Lorient on a four-year contract. The transfer fee was priced at €1 million. He signed a new three-year contract on 23 July 2013. He was signed as a replacement for Laurent Koscielny who had moved to Arsenal. Koné made 139 appearances, scoring seven goals over six seasons at Lorient.

=== Sunderland ===
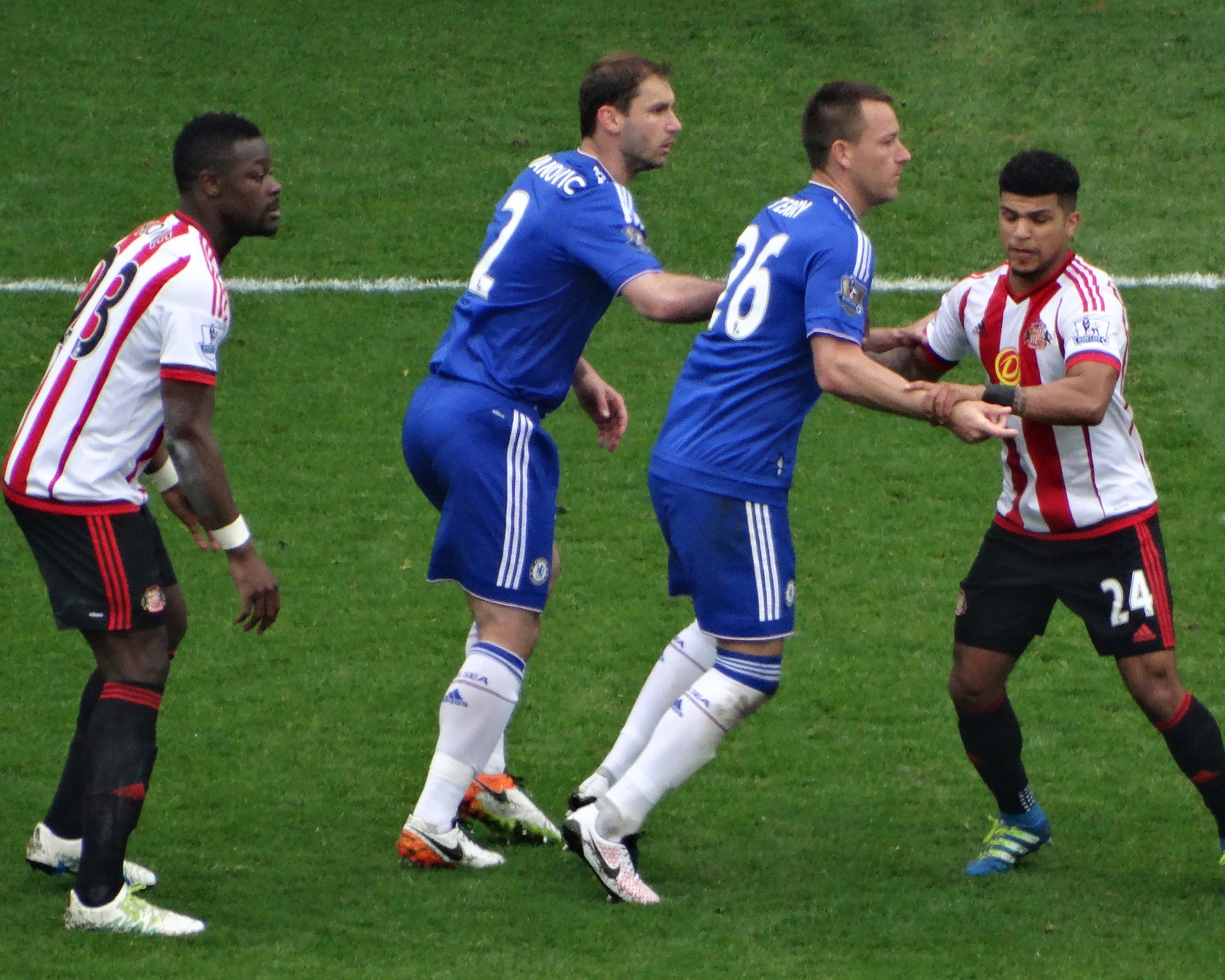
Koné (left) playing for Sunderland against Chelsea in May 2016

On 27 January 2016, Koné signed for Premier League club Sunderland for an undisclosed fee until 2020. This followed a protracted transfer saga that had previously broken down twice, and had seen Lorient threaten Sunderland with legal action for initially pulling out of a deal. On 13 February, Koné played a big part in securing a vital win for the Black Cats against Manchester United. From an 82nd-minute corner, Koné rose up for a header and as the ball headed towards the goal, David de Gea and Anthony Martial got in a tangle before the ball eventually went in off the back of the Spanish goalkeeper for an own goal. Koné followed this up with two goals against Everton on 11 May 2016 in a 3–0 victory that saved Sunderland from relegation.

After telling new manager David Moyes that he wanted to leave the club in August, Koné had a change of heart and eventually signed a new five-year contract on 14 September 2016.

==== Loan to Strasbourg ====
On 1 August 2018, Koné joined Ligue 1 side Strasbourg on a season-long loan. Strasbourg were also given the option to sign the centre-back permanently at the end of the season.

==== Strasbourg ====
On 1 June 2019, following a successful loan stint, Koné joined Strasbourg permanently from Sunderland for an undisclosed fee. In June 2021 he left Strasbourg on a free transfer due to his contract expiring.

==== Lausanne-Sport ====
On 8 November 2021, Koné signed for Lausanne-Sport on a free transfer, four months after his release from Strasbourg.

==== Le Mans ====
On 16 January 2023, Koné joined Le Mans in the third-tier Championnat National.

== International career ==
Koné was born in France to Ivorian parents. He is a former French youth international who has played at the under-17, under-18, under-19, and under-20 levels. Koné played with the latter team at the 2009 Mediterranean Games and the 2010 Toulon Tournament. He switched to the Ivory Coast national team and made his debut in a 4–1 loss to Cameroon in 2014.

== Career statistics ==
=== Club ===
As of match played 1 July 2019

Appearances and goals by club, season and competition
Club	Season	League			National Cup		League Cup		Other		Total	
Club	Season	Division	Apps	Goals	Apps	Goals	Apps	Goals	Apps	Goals	Apps	Goals
Châteauroux	2006–07	Ligue 2	5	0	0	0	0	0	—		5	0
Châteauroux	2007–08	Ligue 2	16	0	0	0	0	0	—		16	0
Châteauroux	2008–09	Ligue 2	27	1	0	0	3	0	—		30	1
Châteauroux	2009–10	Ligue 2	26	3	1	0	0	0	—		27	3
Châteauroux	Total		74	4	1	0	3	0	—		78	4
Lorient	2010–11	Ligue 1	7	1	2	0	0	0	—		9	1
Lorient	2011–12	Ligue 1	21	1	1	0	4	0	—		26	1
Lorient	2012–13	Ligue 1	32	3	1	0	1	0	—		34	3
Lorient	2013–14	Ligue 1	18	1	0	0	1	0	="2"|—		19	1
Lorient	2014–15	Ligue 1	30	1	0	0	1	0	—		31	1
Lorient	2015–16	Ligue 1	18	0	1	0	1	0	—		20	0
Lorient	Total		126	7	5	0	8	0	—		139	7
Lorient B	2010–11	CFA	9	0	—		—		—		9	0
Lorient B	2011–12	CFA	2	0	—		—		—		2	0
Lorient B	2015–16	CFA	1	0	—		—		—		1	0
Lorient B	Total		12	0	—		—		—		12	0
Sunderland	2015–16	Premier League	15	2	—		—		—		15	2
Sunderland	2016–17	Premier League	30	1	0	0	1	0	—		31	1
Sunderland	2017–18	Championship	24	0	0	0	2	0	—		26	0
Sunderland	Total		69	3	0	0	3	0	—		72	3
Strasbourg (loan)	2018–19	Ligue 1	27	1	1	0	4	1	—		32	2
Career total			308	15	7	0	18	1	—		333	16

=== International ===
As of match played 29 July 2019

Appearances and goals by national team and year
National team	Year	Apps	Goals
Ivory Coast	2014	1	0
Ivory Coast	2015	3	0
Ivory Coast	2016	5	0
Total		9	0

== Honours ==
Strasbourg

- Coupe de la Ligue: 2018–19
