= Pablo Martinez (French footballer) =

French footballer (born 1989)

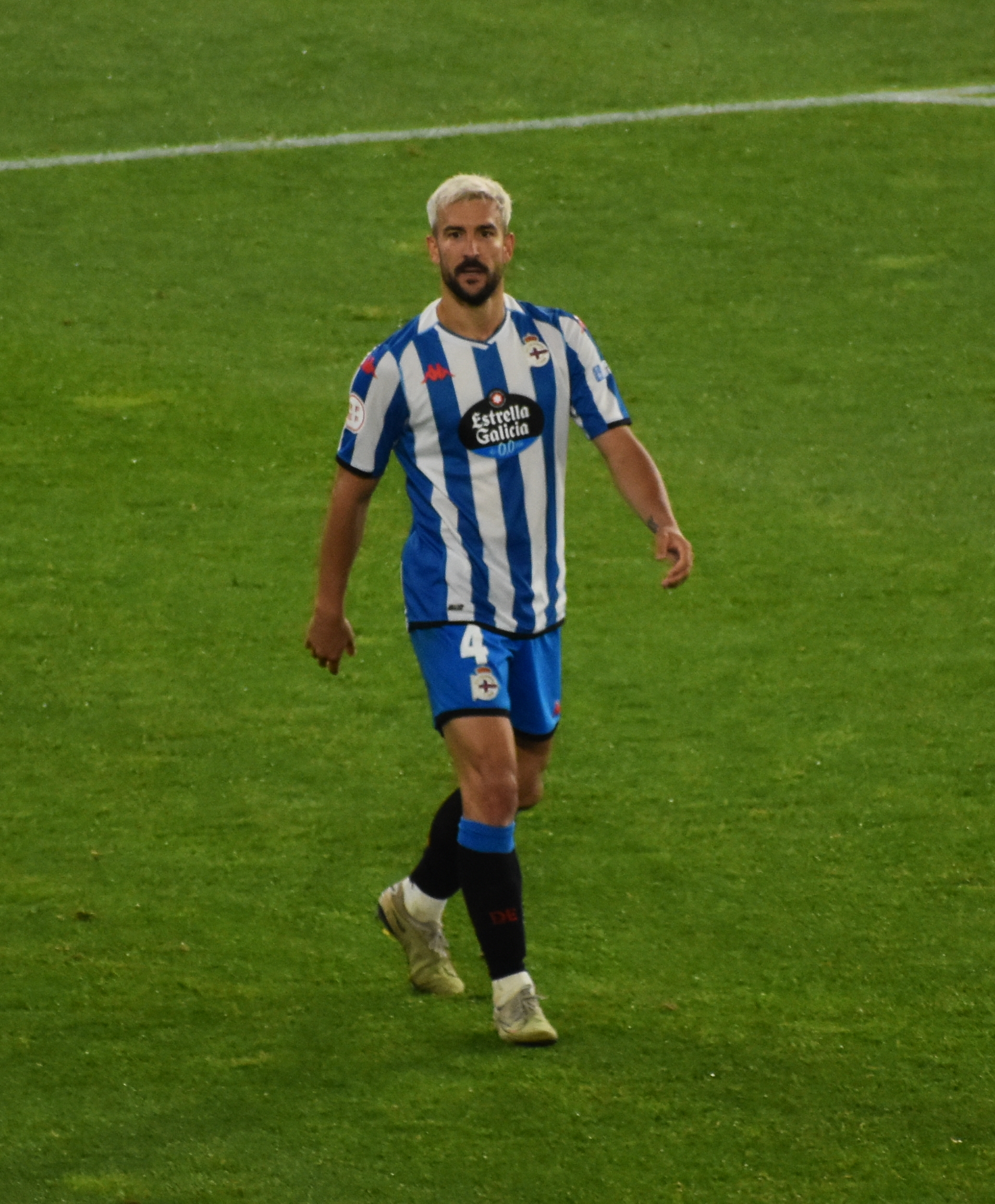
- Martinez playing for Deportivo La Coruña in 2024

Personal information
- Full name: Pablo Jean-Antoine Martinez
- Date of birth: 21 February 1989 (age 37)
- Place of birth: Martigues, France
- Height: 1.82 m (6 ft 0 in)
- Positions: Centre-back; left-back

Team information
- Current team: Nîmes
- Number: 4

Youth career
- 2003–2007: Nîmes

Senior career*
Years	Team	Apps	(Gls)
2007–2009	Mallorca B		
2009–2010	Uzès Pont du Gard		
2010–2011	Martigues	6	(0)
2011–2013	Uzès Pont du Gard	63	(2)
2013–2016	Ajaccio	94	(1)
2016–2017	Angers	9	(0)
2017–2019	Strasbourg	56	(3)
2019–2022	Nîmes	63	(2)
2022–2025	Deportivo La Coruña	88	(3)
2025–	Nîmes	7	(0)
- * Club domestic league appearances and goals as of 7 February 2026

Pablo Jean-Antoine Martinez (born 21 February 1989) is a French professional footballer who plays as a defender for Championnat National 1 club Nîmes.

== Career ==
After years in the French lower divisions, Martinez joined Ajaccio in June 2013, while the club was in the third division. He made his full professional debut a year-later, in a Ligue 2 victory over Valenciennes.

In June 2016, free agent Martinez joined Angers on a three-year contract. In June 2019, after two years at Strasbourg, he moved to Nîmes on a free transfer having agreed on a three-year contract.

On 1 September 2022, Martinez returned to Spain after 13 years and signed for Deportivo de La Coruña in the Primera Federación. On 31 May 2024, after being a starter as the club achieved promotion to Segunda División, he agreed to a one-year extension.

== Personal life ==
Martinez holds French and Spanish nationalities.

== Honours ==
Strasbourg

- Coupe de la Ligue: 2018–19
