= Anthony Gonçalves =

French footballer (born 1986)

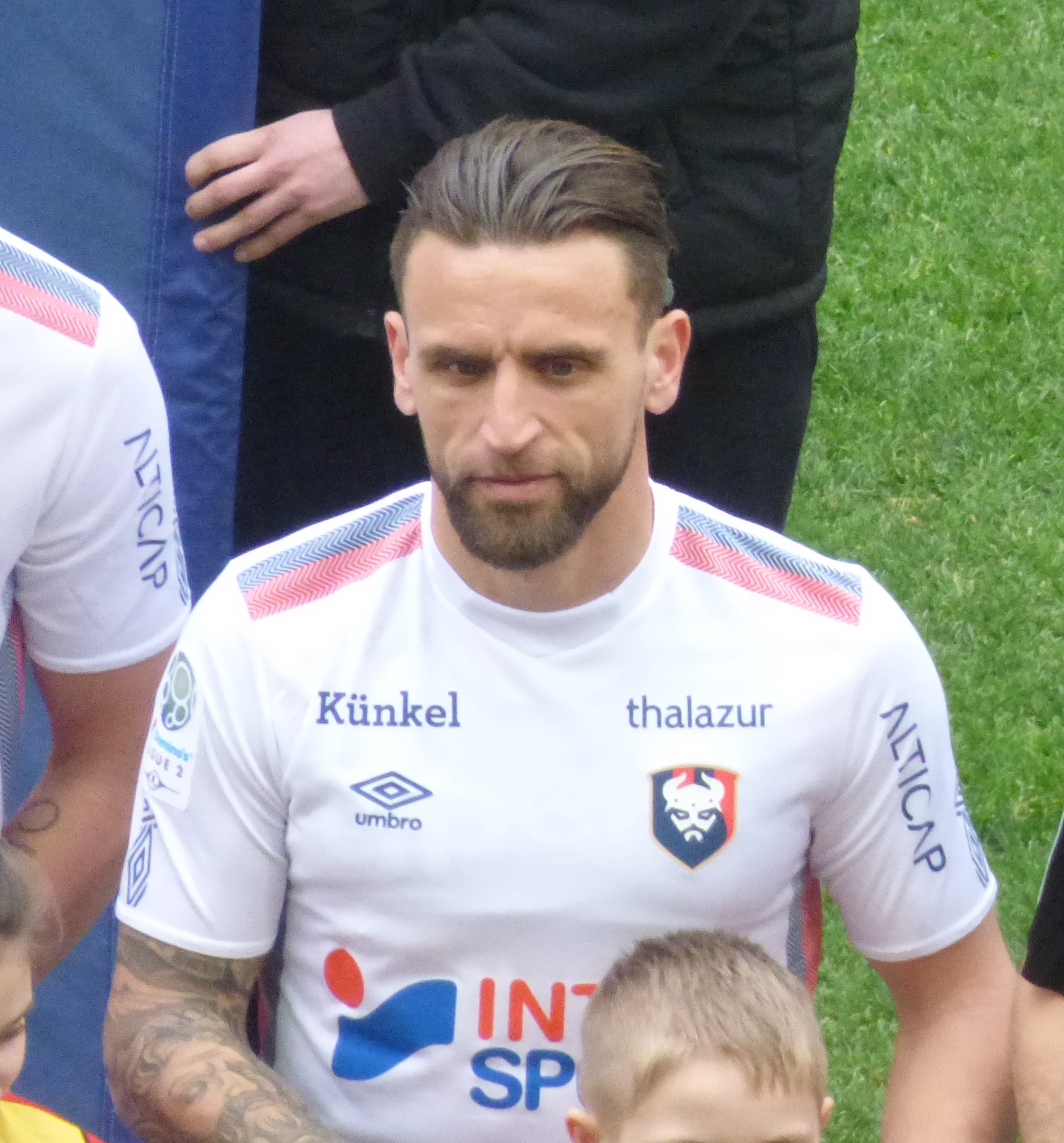
- Gonçalves in 2020

Personal information
- Date of birth: 6 March 1986 (age 40)
- Place of birth: Chartres, France
- Height: 1.79 m (5 ft 10 in)
- Position: Midfielder

Senior career*
| Years | Team | Apps | (Gls) |
| 2005–2011 | Laval B | 70 | (2) |
| 2007–2016 | Laval | 250 | (11) |
| 2016–2019 | Strasbourg | 74 | (5) |
| 2016–2019 | Strasbourg B | 2 | (1) |
| 2019–2022 | Caen | 62 | (1) |
| 2022–2025 | Laval | 80 | (2) |
- * Club domestic league appearances and goals as of 11 May 2025

Anthony Gonçalves (born 6 March 1986) is a French professional footballer who plays as a midfielder.

== Early life ==
Anthony Gonçalves was born in Chartres, the capital of the Eure-et-Loir department of France.

== Career ==
He made over 200 appearances in the Ligue 2 for Laval.

In June 2016, he joined Strasbourg on a two-year contract.

On 23 June 2019, he signed a three-year contract with Caen. He was named captain, replacing the departing Fayçal Fajr.

In July 2022, Anthony Gonçalves signed a new "1+1 year" contract with Laval, as the club returns to Ligue 2.

== Personal life ==
Born in France, Gonçalves is of Portuguese descent.

== Career statistics ==
As of match played on 1 July 2019

Appearances and goals by club, season and competition
| Club | Season | League | | | Cup | | League Cup | | Other | | Total | |
| Club | Season | Division | Apps | Goals | Apps | Goals | Apps | Goals | Apps | Goals | Apps | Goals |
|---|---|---|---|---|---|---|---|---|---|---|---|---|
| Laval | 2009–10 | Ligue 2 | 28 | 1 | 0 | 0 | 2 | 0 | 0 | 0 | 30 | 1 |
| Laval | 2010–11 | Ligue 2 | 10 | 0 | 0 | 0 | 0 | 0 | 0 | 0 | 10 | 0 |
| Laval | 2011–12 | Ligue 2 | 31 | 2 | 2 | 0 | 1 | 0 | 0 | 0 | 34 | 2 |
| Laval | 2012–13 | Ligue 2 | 33 | 4 | 1 | 0 | 2 | 0 | 0 | 0 | 36 | 4 |
| Laval | 2013–14 | Ligue 2 | 34 | 0 | 1 | 0 | 1 | 0 | 0 | 0 | 36 | 0 |
| Laval | 2014–15 | Ligue 2 | 35 | 2 | 2 | 0 | 2 | 1 | 0 | 0 | 39 | 3 |
| Laval | 2015–16 | Ligue 2 | 35 | 0 | 1 | 0 | 4 | 1 | 0 | 0 | 40 | 1 |
| Laval | Total | | 206 | 9 | 7 | 0 | 12 | 2 | 0 | 0 | 225 | 11 |
| Strasbourg | 2016–17 | Ligue 2 | 27 | 0 | 3 | 0 | 2 | 0 | 0 | 0 | 32 | 0 |
| Strasbourg | 2017–18 | Ligue 1 | 29 | 0 | 4 | 2 | 2 | 0 | 0 | 0 | 35 | 2 |
| Strasbourg | 2017–18 | Ligue 1 | 18 | 5 | 2 | 0 | 1 | 0 | 0 | 0 | 21 | 5 |
| Strasbourg | Total | | 74 | 5 | 9 | 2 | 5 | 0 | 0 | 0 | 88 | 7 |
| Strasbourg B | 2017–18 | Championnat National 3 | 1 | 1 | — | | | | | | 1 | 1 |
| Strasbourg B | 2017–18 | Championnat National 3 | 1 | 0 | — | | | | | | 1 | 0 |
| Strasbourg B | Total | | 2 | 1 | 0 | 0 | 0 | 0 | 0 | 0 | 2 | 1 |
| Career total | | | 282 | 15 | 16 | 2 | 17 | 2 | 0 | 0 | 315 | 19 |
