= Jérémy Grimm =

French footballer (born 1987)

Personal information
- Date of birth: 27 March 1987 (age 39)
- Place of birth: Ostheim, France
- Height: 1.81 m (5 ft 11 in)
- Position: Midfielder

Senior career*
| Years | Team | Apps | (Gls) |
| 2007–2008 | Strasbourg B | | |
| 2008–2010 | SR Delémont | | |
| 2010–2013 | Colmar | 90 | (8) |
| 2013–2020 | Strasbourg | 156 | (9) |
| 2018–2020 | Strasbourg B | 18 | (1) |
| 2021–2024 | Colmar | 55 | (3) |
- * Club domestic league appearances and goals as of 7 October 2025

Jérémy Grimm (born 27 March 1987) is a French professional footballer who plays as a midfielder.

== Club career ==
On 2 February 2021, he returned to Colmar.
