= Ismaïl Aaneba =

French footballer (born 1999)

Personal information
- Date of birth: 29 May 1999 (age 27)
- Place of birth: Mantes-la-Jolie, France
- Height: 1.85 m (6 ft 1 in)
- Position: Right-back

Team information
- Current team: Ferencváros
- Number: 75

Youth career
- 2008–2016: Mantes

Senior career*
Years	Team	Apps	(Gls)
2016–2017	Mantes	11	(1)
2017–2020	Strasbourg B	50	(0)
2018–2021	Strasbourg	5	(0)
2021–2023	Sochaux	63	(0)
2023–	Ferencváros	6	(1)

International career^{‡}
2018	France U19	1	(0)
2018	France U20	1	(0)
- * Club domestic league appearances and goals as of 12 August 2024 ‡ National team caps and goals as of 11 June 2021 (UTC)

Ismaïl Aaneba (Arabic: إسماعيل عنيبة; born 29 May 1999) is a French professional footballer who plays as a right-back for Hungarian club Ferencváros.

== Early life ==
Aaneba was born in Mantes-la-Jolie, France, to Moroccan parents. He holds Moroccan nationality from birth and acquired French nationality on 26 February 2004, through the collective effect of his mother's naturalization.

== Club career ==
=== Strasbourg ===
A youth product of Mantes, Aaneba moved to Strasbourg on 30 October 2018. He made his professional debut with the club in a 2–0 Coupe de la Ligue win over Lille on 20 October 2018.

=== Sochaux ===
On 10 June 2021, Aaneba signed a three-year contract with Sochaux.

=== Ferencváros ===
On 2 September 2023, Aaneba joined Ferencváros in Hungary.

On 20 April 2024, the Ferencváros–Kisvárda tie ended with a goalless draw at the Groupama Aréna on the 29th match day of the 2023–24 Nemzeti Bajnokság I season which meant that Ferencváros won their 35th championship.

On 15 May 2024, Ferencváros were defeated by Paks 2–0 in the 2024 Magyar Kupa Final at the Puskás Aréna.

== International career ==
Aaneba is a youth international for France. He was called up to the Morocco U20s in October 2017.

== Honours ==
Strasbourg

- Coupe de la Ligue: 2018–19
