= 2018–19 En Avant de Guingamp season =

Guingamp
2018–19 season
- Chairman: Bertrand Desplat
- Manager: Jocelyn Gourvennec
- Stadium: Stade de Roudourou
- Ligue 1: 20th (relegated)
- Coupe de France: Round of 16
- Coupe de la Ligue: Runners-up
- Top goalscorer: League: Marcus Thuram (9); All: Marcus Thuram (13)
- Highest home attendance: League/All: 19,003 (18 August vs. Paris Saint-Germain)
- Lowest home attendance: League: 12,327 (1 September vs. Toulouse); All: 8,768 (7 February vs. Lyon (CdF))
- Average home league attendance: 14,731
- Biggest win: 2–0 at Monaco (22 December); 4–2 v. Stade Pontivyen; 5 January, CdF)
- Biggest defeat: 0–9 at PSG (19 January)
Home colours	Away colours	Third colours

The 2018–19 En Avant de Guingamp season was the 106th professional season of the club since its creation in 1912.

== Players ==
=== First-team squad ===
Note: Flags indicate national team as defined under FIFA eligibility rules; some limited exceptions apply. Players may hold more than one non-FIFA nationality.

No.	Pos.	Nation	Player
1	GK	SWE	Karl-Johan Johnsson
2	DF	COD	Jordan Ikoko
4	DF	MLI	Djegui Koita
5	DF	POR	Pedro Rebocho
6	MF	RSA	Lebogang Phiri
7	MF	FRA	Ludovic Blas
8	MF	FRA	Lucas Deaux
10	MF	FRA	Nicolas Benezet
11	FW	FRA	Marcus Thuram
12	FW	COD	Yeni Ngbakoto
14	FW	FRA	Nathaël Julan
15	DF	FRA	Jérémy Sorbon (vice-captain)

No.	Pos.	Nation	Player
16	GK	FRA	Marc-Aurèle Caillard
18	MF	FRA	Guessouma Fofana
20	DF	CMR	Félix Eboa Eboa
22	MF	FRA	Étienne Didot
23	FW	FRA	Ronny Rodelin
24	MF	FRA	Marcus Coco
25	DF	FRA	Cheick Traoré
26	FW	FRA	Nolan Roux
27	MF	FRA	Franck Tabanou
29	DF	FRA	Christophe Kerbrat (captain)
30	GK	SLO	Denis Petrić
34	FW	FRA	Matthias Phaeton

=== Out on loan ===
Note: Flags indicate national team as defined under FIFA eligibility rules; some limited exceptions apply. Players may hold more than one non-FIFA nationality.

No.	Pos.	Nation	Player
—	GK	FRA	Théo Guivarch (on loan to Cholet)
—	DF	FRA	Sikou Niakaté (on loan to Valenciennes)

No.	Pos.	Nation	Player
—	FW	FRA	Jérémy Livolant (on loan to Châteauroux)
—	FW	FRA	Yannis Salibur (on loan to St-Étienne)

== Competitions ==
=== Ligue 1 ===
==== League table ====
Pos	Team	Pld	W	D	L	GF	GA	GD	Pts	Qualification or relegation
16	Toulouse	38	8	14	16	35	57	−22	38	
17	Monaco	38	8	12	18	38	57	−19	36	
18	Dijon (O)	38	9	7	22	31	60	−29	34	Qualification to Relegation play-offs
19	Caen (R)	38	7	12	19	29	54	−25	33	Relegation to Ligue 2
20	Guingamp (R)	38	5	12	21	28	68	−40	27	Relegation to Ligue 2

Source: Ligue 1 and Soccerway
Rules for classification: 1) Points; 2) Goal difference; 3) Head-to-head points; 4) Head-to-head goal difference; 5) Head-to-head goals scored; 6) Head-to-head away goals scored; 7) Goals scored; 8) Away goals scored; 9) Most goals scored in single league match; 10) Fairplay ranking.
(O) Play-off winners; (R) Relegated

==== Results summary ====
Overall								Home						Away					
Pld	W	D	L	GF	GA	GD	Pts	W	D	L	GF	GA	GD	W	D	L	GF	GA	GD
38	5	12	21	28	68	−40	27	3	7	9	16	27	−11	2	5	12	12	41	−29

Last updated: 24 May 2019.
Source: Competitive matches

==== Results by round ====
Round	1	2	3	4	5	6	7	8	9	10	11	12	13	14	15	16	17	18	19	20	21	22	23	24	25	26	27	28	29	30	31	32	33	34	35	36	37	38
Ground	A	H	A	H	A	H	A	A	H	A	H	A	H	A	H	A	H	H	A	H	A	H	A	H	A	H	H	A	H	A	H	A	H	A	H	A	H	A
Result	L	L	L	L	L	L	D	W	D	D	D	L	L	L	D	L	L	W	W	L	L	L	D	L	L	W	D	L	W	L	D	D	L	L	D	D	D	L
Position	12	17	20	20	20	20	20	20	20	20	20	20	20	20	20	20	20	20	20	20	20	20	20	20	20	20	20	20	18	19	20	19	20	20	20	20	20	20

Source: Results
A = Away; H = Home; W = Win; D = Draw; L = Loss

==== Matches ====
Win Draw Loss

11 August 2018 1	Saint-Étienne	2–1	Guingamp	Saint-Étienne
20:00 CEST (UTC+2)	Diony (yellow card) 25', (goal) 80'; Khazri 45'; Selnæs (yellow card) 54'; Ruffier (yellow card) 55'	Report	Thuram 56' (pen.); Kerbrat (yellow card) 60'	Stadium: Stade Geoffroy-Guichard; Attendance: 26,006; Referee: Amaury Delerue

18 August 2018 2	Guingamp	1–3	Paris Saint-Germain	Guingamp
17:00 CEST (UTC+2)	Roux 20'	Report	Rabiot (yellow card) 19'; Neymar 53' (pen.); Mbappé 82', 90'	Stadium: Stade de Roudourou; Attendance: 19,003; Referee: Clément Turpin

26 August 2018 3	Lille	3–0	Guingamp	Villeneuve-d'Ascq
15:00 CEST (UTC+2)	Xeka 7'; Bamba 10', 73'; Soumaoro (yellow card) 63'; J. Fonte (yellow card) 84'	Report	Traoré (yellow card) 49'; Kerbrat (red card) 81'	Stadium: Stade Pierre-Mauroy; Attendance: 27,230; Referee: Johan Hamel

1 September 2018 4	Guingamp	1–2	Toulouse	Guingamp
20:00 CEST (UTC+2)	Eboa Eboa (yellow card) 38'; Thuram 45'; Deaux (yellow card) 54'; Didot (yellow card) 84'	Report	Gradel 2'; Sangaré 12'; Todibo (yellow card) 17' (yellow-red card) 26'	Stadium: Stade de Roudourou; Attendance: 12,327; Referee: Karim Abed

16 September 2018 5	Marseille	4–0	Guingamp	Marseille
21:00 CEST (UTC+2)	Ocampos (yellow card) 32'; Thauvin 57', 80'; Payet 73'; Mitroglou 83'	Report	Eboa Eboa (yellow card) 54'	Stadium: Stade Vélodrome; Attendance: 50,450; Referee: Amaury Delerue

23 September 2018 6	Guingamp	1–3	Bordeaux	Guingamp
17:00 CEST (UTC+2)	Phiri (yellow card) 56'; Thuram 70' (pen.)	Report	Sankharé (yellow card) 18'; Kamano 53'; Lerager (yellow card) 58'; Sabaly (yellow card) 67'; Pablo (yellow card) 68'; Karamoh 80'; Préville 90+5'	Stadium: Stade de Roudourou; Attendance: 14,772; Referee: Frank Schneider

26 September 2018 7	Nîmes	0–0	Guingamp	Guingamp
19:00 CEST (UTC+2)	Landre (yellow card) 67'; Paquiez (yellow card) 81'; Diallo (yellow card) 87'	Report	Eboa Eboa (yellow card) 32'; Thuram (yellow card) 45+2'; Kerbrat (yellow card) 58'	Stadium: Stade de Roudourou; Attendance: 14,772; Referee: Benoît Millot

29 September 2018 8	Angers	0–1	Guingamp	Angers
20:00 CEST (UTC+2)	Bahoken (yellow card) 6'; Thomas (yellow card) 27'; Bamba (yellow card) 41'	Report	Benezet (yellow card) 38', (goal) 45+2'; Rebocho (yellow card) 51'; Julan (yellow card) 60'	Stadium: Stade Raymond Kopa; Attendance: 9,483; Referee: Nicolas Rainville

6 October 2018 9	Guingamp	1–1	Montpellier	Guingamp
20:00 CEST (UTC+2)	Thuram (red card) 7'; Benezet 64'	Report	Delort 30'; Oyongo (yellow card) 31'; Mollet (yellow card) 39' (yellow-red card) 39'	Stadium: Stade de Roudourou; Attendance: 13,643; Referee: Jérémy Stinat

20 October 2018 10	Caen	0–0	Guingamp	Caen
20:00 CEST (UTC+2)		Report		Stadium: Stade Michel d'Ornano; Attendance: 16,009; Referee: Hakim Ben El Hadj

27 October 2018 11	Guingamp	1–1	Strasbourg	Guingamp
20:00 CEST (UTC+02:00)	Benezet 6'; Fofana (yellow card) 71'	Report	da Costa (yellow card) 49'; Zohi 88'	Stadium: Stade de Roudourou; Attendance: 13,643; Referee: Willy Delajod

4 November 2018 12	Nantes	5–0	Guingamp	Nantes
15:00 CET (UTC+1)	Sala 43' (pen.), 84'; Rongier 63'; A. Touré 70'; Girotto 78'	Report	Blas (yellow card) 32'; Traoré (yellow card) 41'	Stadium: Stade de la Beaujoire; Attendance: 25,753; Referee: Jérôme Brisard

10 November 2018 13	Guingamp	2–4	Lyon	Guingamp
17:00 CET (UTC+1)	Thuram 22', 78' (pen.); Blas (yellow card) 69'	Report	Aouar 63'; Depay 67', 73', (yellow card) 75'; Morel (yellow card) 77'; Cornet 84'	Stadium: Stade de Roudourou; Attendance: 14,171; Referee: Mikael Lesage

24 November 2018 14	Reims	2–1	Guingamp	Reims
20:00 CET (UTC+1)	Chavalerin 2'; Romao (yellow card) 22'; Dia 68'	Report	Ikoko (yellow card) 10'; Thuram (yellow card) 34', (goal) 81' (pen.); Rebocho (yellow card) 65'; Sorbon (yellow card) 85'	Stadium: Stade Auguste Delaune; Attendance: 10,028; Referee: Johan Hamel

1 December 2018 15	Guingamp	0–0	Nice	Guingamp
20:00 CET (UTC+1)	Kerbrat (yellow card) 73'	Report	Boscagli (yellow card) 7'	Stadium: Stade de Roudourou; Attendance: 12,671; Referee: Ruddy Buquet

5 December 2018 16	Dijon	2–1	Guingamp	Dijon
19:00 CET (UTC+1)	Jeannot 14'; Rosier (yellow card) 18'; Tavares (yellow card) 45+2'; Lautoa (yellow card) 59' (yellow-red card) 71'; Haddadi (yellow card) 81', (goal) 86'; Abeid (yellow card) 89'	Report	Rebocho (yellow card) 43'; Coco 79'	Stadium: Stade Gaston Gérard; Attendance: 11,711; Referee: Thomas Leonard

8 December 2018 17	Guingamp	1–2	Amiens	Guingamp
20:00 CET (UTC+1)	Didot (yellow card) 31', (goal) 70'; Thuram (red card) 90+5'	Report	Gouano (yellow card) 56'; Gnahoré 63'; Mendoza 81', (yellow card) 84'; El Hajjam (yellow card) 90+2'; Gurtner (yellow card) 90+4'	Stadium: Stade de Roudourou; Attendance: 14,089; Referee: Benoît Bastien

16 December 2018 18	Guingamp	Postponed	Rennes	Guingamp
19:00 CET (UTC+1)				Stadium: Stade de Roudourou

22 December 2018 19	Monaco	0–2	Guingamp	Monaco
21:00 CET (UTC+1)	Faivre (yellow card) 25'; Glik (yellow card) 81'	Report	Ikoko (yellow card) 14'; Rebocho (yellow card) 26'; Thuram 68'; Roux 75', (yellow card) 90+2'; Fofana (yellow card) 78'	Stadium: Stade Louis II; Attendance: 6,424; Referee: Frank Schneider

12 January 2019 20	Guingamp	0–1	Saint-Étienne	Guingamp
20:00 CET (UTC+1)		Report	Khazri 7', (yellow card) 56'	Stadium: Stade de Roudourou; Attendance: 15,342; Referee: Karim Abed

16 January 2019 18	Guingamp	2–1	Rennes	Guingamp
19:00 CET (UTC+1)	Coco (yellow card) 3'; Eboa Eboa 40'; Deaux 59'; Blas (yellow card) 90+3'	Report	Traoré (yellow card) 47'; André (yellow card) 81'; Niang 86'; Zeffane (yellow card) 90+2'	Stadium: Stade de Roudourou; Attendance: 14,179; Referee: Clément Turpin
Note: The match, originally scheduled for 16 December 2018, was postponed due to security concerns as a result of the yellow vests movement.

19 January 2019 21	Paris Saint-Germain	9–0	Guingamp	Paris
17:00 CET (UTC+1)	Neymar 11', 68'; Mbappé 37', 45', 80'; Cavani 59', 66', 75'; Meunier 83'; Kurzawa (yellow card) 89'	Report		Stadium: Parc des Princes; Attendance: 47,268; Referee: Amaury Delerue

26 January 2019 22	Guingamp	0–1	Reims	Guingamp
20:00 CET (UTC+1)	Coco (yellow card) 56'; Djilobodji (red card) 59'	Report	Chavalerin (yellow card) 35'; Cafaro 38'; Kamara (yellow card) 69'	Stadium: Stade de Roudourou; Attendance: 13,853; Referee: Thomas Leonard

2 February 2019 23	Bordeaux	Postponed	Guingamp	Bordeaux
20:00 CET (UTC+1)		Report		Stadium: Matmut Atlantique

10 February 2019 24	Guingamp	0–2	Lille	Guingamp
17:00 CET (UTC+1)	Ndong (yellow card) 33'; Mendy (yellow card) 79'	Report	Gabriel (yellow card) 31'; Leão 47'; Rémy 90+4' (pen.)	Stadium: Stade de Roudourou; Attendance: 13,886; Referee: Benoît Bastien

15 February 2019 25	Lyon	2–1	Guingamp	Décines-Charpieu
20:45 CET (UTC+1)	Terrier 15'; Marçal (yellow card) 28'; Fekir 35'; Traoré (yellow card) 67'	Report	Eboa Eboa 21', (yellow card) 84'	Stadium: Parc Olympique Lyonnais; Attendance: 40,305; Referee: Antony Gautier

20 February 2019 23	Bordeaux	0–0	Guingamp	Bordeaux
19:00 CET (UTC+1)	Jovanović (yellow card) 36'; Cornelius (yellow card) 90+1'	Report	Phiri (yellow card) 77'; Deaux (yellow card) 90+3'	Stadium: Matmut Atlantique; Attendance: 14,527; Referee: Willy Delajod
Note: Rescheduled from 2 February 2019.

23 February 2019 26	Guingamp	1–0	Angers	Guingamp
20:00 CET (UTC+1)	Ndong (yellow card) 7'; Deaux 90+2', (yellow card) 90+3'	Report	Bamba (yellow card) 47'; Thomas (yellow card) 81'	Stadium: Stade de Roudourou; Attendance: 16,306; Referee: Jérôme Miguelgorry

3 March 2019 27	Guingamp	0–0	Nantes	Guingamp
15:00 CET (UTC+1)	Eboa Eboa (yellow card) 90+4'	Report	Pallois (yellow card) 45'; Traoré (yellow card) 85'	Stadium: Stade de Roudourou; Attendance: 15,025; Referee: Ruddy Buquet

10 March 2019 28	Toulouse	1–0	Guingamp	Toulouse
15:00 CET (UTC+1)	Sanogo 20', (yellow card) 58'	Report	Thuram (yellow card) 27'; Coco (red card) 44'; Phiri (yellow card) 52'	Stadium: Stadium Municipal; Attendance: 19,802; Referee: Jérôme Brisard

16 March 2019 29	Guingamp	1–0	Dijon	Guingamp
20:00 CET (UTC+1)	Blas 86' (pen.)	Report	Allain (yellow card) 85'; Kwon (yellow card) 90+2'	Stadium: Stade de Roudourou; Attendance: 15,834; Referee: Mikael Lesage

3 April 2019 30	Montpellier	2–0	Guingamp	Montpellier
19:00 CEST (UTC+2)	Delort 22'; Ristić 78'	Report	Merghem (yellow card) 67'; Traoré (yellow card) 68'	Stadium: Stade de la Mosson; Attendance: 11,187; Referee: Frank Schneider

6 April 2019 31	Guingamp	1–1	Monaco	Guingamp
20:00 CEST (UTC+2)	Eboa Eboa 23'; Blas (yellow card) 45'; Didot (yellow card) 64'; Roux (yellow card) 80'; Djilobodji (yellow card) 88'	Report	Glik (yellow card) 56'; Sidibé (yellow card) 78'; Jemerson (yellow card) 85'; Vinícius (yellow card) 89'; Jovetić 90+3', (yellow card) 90+3'	Stadium: Stade de Roudourou; Attendance: 13,997; Referee: Benoît Bastien

13 April 2019 32	Strasbourg	3–3	Guingamp	Strasbourg
20:00 CEST (UTC+2)	Ajorque 39', 73'; Gonçalves (yellow card) 44'; Prcić 69'	Report	Thuram 37'; Deaux (yellow card) 41', (goal) 63'; Ndong (yellow card) 81'; Sorbon 86'	Stadium: Stade de la Meinau; Attendance: 25,190; Referee: Antony Gautier

20 April 2019 33	Guingamp	1–3	Marseille	Guingamp
17:00 CEST (UTC+2)	Merghem (yellow card) 36'; Ngbakoto 56'; Sorbon (yellow card) 79'	Report	Luiz Gustavo 4'; Ocampos 40', (yellow card) 90'; Thauvin (yellow card) 60'; Sanson (yellow card) 64'; Germain 90+1'	Stadium: Stade de Roudourou; Attendance: 18,164; Referee: Mikael Lesage

28 April 2019 34	Nice	3–0	Guingamp	Nice
15:00 CEST (UTC+2)	Atal 9', 68', 73'; Dante (yellow card) 16'; Hérelle (yellow card) 37'; Tameze (yellow card) 38'; Burner (yellow card) 72'	Report	Merghem (yellow card) 19'; Mendy (yellow card) 70'; Didot (yellow card) 78'	Stadium: Allianz Riviera; Attendance: 16,379; Referee: Hakim Ben El Hadj

4 May 2019 35	Guingamp	0–0	Caen	Guingamp
20:00 CEST (UTC+2)	Coco (yellow card) 90'	Report	Guilbert (yellow card) 30'; Tchokounté (yellow card) 51'; Moussaki (yellow card) 89'; Gradit (yellow card) 90'	Stadium: Stade de Roudourou; Attendance: 16,879; Referee: Jérôme Brisard

12 May 2019 36	Rennes	1–1	Guingamp	Rennes
15:00 CEST (UTC+2)	Sarr 15'; Bourigeaud (yellow card) 21'; Nyamsi (yellow card) 23' (yellow-red card) 79'	Report	Blas (yellow card) 33'; Mendy 87'	Stadium: Roazhon Park; Attendance: 26,119; Referee: Karim Abed

18 May 2019 37	Guingamp	2–2	Nîmes	Guingamp
21:00 CEST (UTC+2)	Thuram 6', (yellow card) 44'; Ikoko (yellow card) 33'; Mendy 35'	Report	Alakouch (yellow card) 48'; Ripart 53'; Bouanga 56'; Briançon (yellow card) 66'	Stadium: Stade de Roudourou; Attendance: 12,096; Referee: Jérôme Miguelgorry

24 May 2019 38	Amiens	2–1	Guingamp	Amiens
21:05 CEST (UTC+2)	Guirassy 14'; Ghoddos 47'	Report	Mendy 66'	Stadium: Stade de la Licorne; Attendance: 11,932; Referee: Amaury Delerue

=== Coupe de France ===
5 January 2019 Round of 64	Stade Pontivyen	2–4	Guingamp	Guingamp
15:00 CET (UTC+1)	Marec 6'; Le Sauce 54' (pen.)	Report	Ngbakoto 15'; Roux 18'; Thuram 64', 67'	Stadium: Stade de Roudourou; Attendance: 7,966; Referee: Yohann Rouinsard

22 January 2019 Round of 32	Nancy	1–2 (a.e.t.)	Guingamp	Tomblaine
18:30 CET (UTC+1)	N'Guessan (yellow card) 57', (goal) 67'; Triboulet (yellow card) 83'	Report	Rodelin 28'; Traoré (yellow card) 45'; Ndong (yellow card) 45+1'; Djilobodji 102'	Stadium: Stade Marcel Picot; Attendance: 4,000; Referee: Ruddy Buquet

7 February 2019 Round of 16	Guingamp	1–2	Lyon	Guingamp
21:00 CET (UTC+1)	Eboa Eboa (yellow card) 26'; Mendy 88'	Report	Dembélé 7'; Tete (yellow card) 46'; Cornet 49'; Tousart (yellow card) 90+4'	Stadium: Stade de Roudourou; Attendance: 8,768; Referee: Frank Schneider

=== Coupe de la Ligue ===
31 October 2018 Round of 32	Guingamp	0–0 (3–2 p)	Angers	Guingamp
21:05 CET (UTC+1)		Report		Stadium: Stade de Roudourou; Attendance: 11,630; Referee: Karim Abed
	Penalties
	Eboa Eboa (penalty missed); Coco (penalty scored); Ngbakoto (penalty missed); Fofana (penalty scored); Blas (penalty scored)		(penalty missed) Kanga; (penalty missed) Capelle; (penalty missed) Bertrand; (penalty scored) Santamaria; (penalty scored) Fulgini

19 December 2018 Round of 16	Nice	0–0 (1–3 p)	Guingamp	Nice
21:05 CET (UTC+1)	Dante (yellow card) 24'; Barbosa (yellow card) 67'	Report	Fofana (yellow card) 33'; Tabanou (yellow card) 73'	Stadium: Allianz Riviera; Attendance: 12,714; Referee: Mikael Lesage
	Penalties
	Lees-Melou (penalty missed); Dante (penalty missed); Walter (penalty scored); Jallet (penalty missed)		(penalty scored) Mendy; (penalty scored) Eboa Eboa; (penalty scored) Ngbakoto

9 January 2019 Quarter-finals	Paris Saint-Germain	1–2	Guingamp	Paris
21:05 CET (UTC+1)	Neymar 63', (yellow card) 90+5'; Verratti (yellow card) 90+5'; Cavani (yellow card) 90+5'	Report	Ngbakoto 83' (pen.); Thuram 90+2' (pen.)	Stadium: Parc des Princes; Attendance: 47,576; Referee: Benoît Bastien

29 January 2019 Semi-finals	Guingamp	2–2 (5–4 p)	Monaco	Guingamp
21:05 CET (UTC+1)	Ndong (yellow card) 39'; Mendy 46'; Thuram 55'	Report	Vainqueur (red card) 14'; Lopes 18'; Golovin 24'; Ballo-Touré (yellow card) 61'	Stadium: Stade du Roudourou; Attendance: 11,216; Referee: Jérôme Brisard
	Penalties
	Rodelin (penalty scored); Roux (penalty scored); Eboa Eboa (penalty missed); Rebocho (penalty scored); Thuram (penalty missed); Phiri (penalty scored); Coco (penalty scored)		(penalty scored) Fàbregas; (penalty scored) Ballo-Touré; (penalty scored) Jemerson; (penalty missed) Henrichs; (penalty missed) Glik; (penalty scored) Sidibé; (penalty missed) Diop

30 March 2019 Final	Strasbourg	0–0 (a.e.t.) (4–1 p)	Guingamp	Villeneuve-d'Ascq
21:05 CET (UTC+1)	Sissoko (yellow card) 69'; Thomasson (yellow card) 96'	Report	Phiri (yellow card) 24'; Benezet (yellow card) 70'	Stadium: Stade Pierre-Mauroy; Attendance: 49,161; Referee: Benoît Millot
	Penalties
	Prcić (penalty scored); Thomasson (penalty scored); Liénard (penalty scored); Carole (penalty scored)		(penalty missed) Mendy; (penalty scored) Didot; (penalty missed) Rodelin
