= 2019 Coupe de la Ligue final =

French League Cup Final
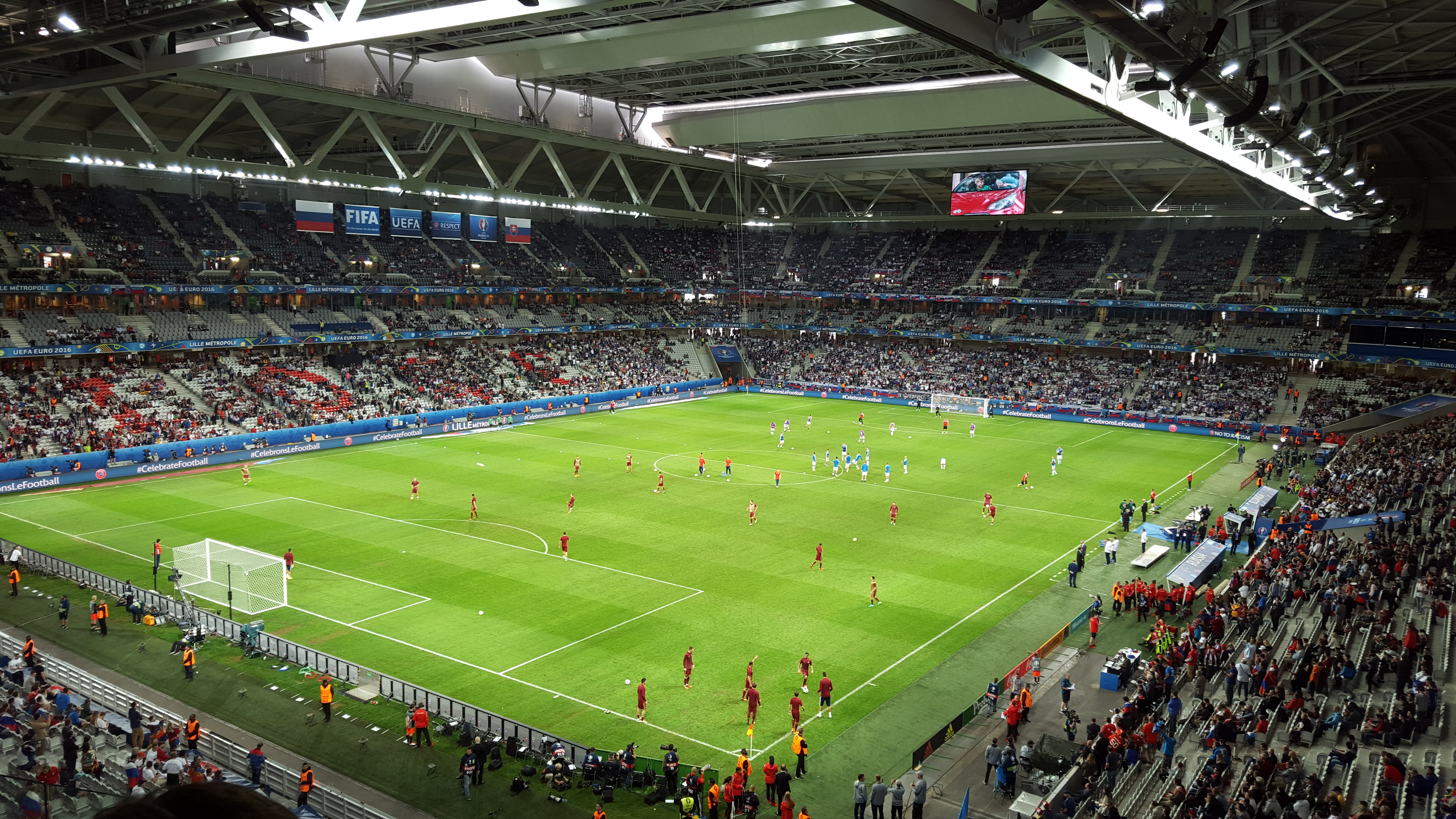
- The Stade Pierre-Mauroy in Villeneuve-d'Ascq hosted the final
- Event: 2018–19 Coupe de la Ligue
Strasbourg	Guingamp
0	0
- After extra time Strasbourg won 4–1 on penalties
- Date: 30 March 2019
- Venue: Stade Pierre-Mauroy, Villeneuve-d'Ascq
- Man of the Match: Bingourou Kamara (Strasbourg)
- Referee: Benoît Millot
- Attendance: 49,161

The 2019 Coupe de la Ligue final was the final of the 2018–19 Coupe de la Ligue, the 25th edition of France's football league cup competition, the Coupe de la Ligue, contested by the 44 teams that the Ligue de Football Professionnel (LFP) manages. The final took place on 30 March 2019 at the Stade Pierre-Mauroy in Villeneuve-d'Ascq and was contested by Strasbourg and Guingamp.

Strasbourg won the final 4–1 on penalties, following a 0–0 draw after extra time, for their fourth Coupe de la Ligue title.

== Route to the final ==
Note: In all results below, the score of the finalist is given first (H: home; A: away).

Strasbourg		Round	Guingamp	
Opponent	Result	2018–19 Coupe de la Ligue	Opponent	Result
Lille (H)	2–0	Third round	Angers (H)	0–0 (3–2 p)
Marseille (A)	1–1 (4–2 p)	Round of 16	Nice (A)	0–0 (3–1 p)
Lyon (A)	2–1	Quarter-finals	Paris Saint-Germain (A)	2–1
Bordeaux (H)	3–2	Semi-finals	Monaco (H)	2–2 (5–4 p)

== Match ==
=== Details ===
30 March 2019
21:05 CET

Strasbourg	0–0 (a.e.t.)	Guingamp
	Report
Penalties
Prcić (penalty scored); Thomasson (penalty scored); Liénard (penalty scored); Carole (penalty scored)	4–1	(penalty missed) Mendy; (penalty scored) Didot; (penalty missed) Rodelin

Stade Pierre-Mauroy, Villeneuve-d'Ascq
Attendance: 49,161
Referee: Benoît Millot

Strasbourg	Guingamp

GK	30	(France) Bingourou Kamara
CB	5	(Ivory Coast) Lamine Koné		(substituted off) 90'
CB	13	(Serbia) Stefan Mitrović (c)
CB	4	(France) Pablo Martinez
RWB	27	(France) Kenny Lala
LWB	19	(France) Anthony Caci
CM	18	(France) Ibrahima Sissoko	(yellow card) 69'	(substituted off) 118'
CM	14	(Bosnia and Herzegovina) Sanjin Prcić
CM	26	(France) Adrien Thomasson	(yellow card) 97'
CF	12	(South Africa) Lebo Mothiba		(substituted off) 81'
CF	25	(France) Ludovic Ajorque		(substituted off) 105'
Substitutes:
GK	1	(Belgium) Matz Sels
DF	23	(France) Lionel Carole		(substituted on) 90'
MF	11	(France) Dimitri Liénard		(substituted on) 118'
MF	17	(France) Anthony Gonçalves
MF	22	(France) Youssouf Fofana
FW	20	(Mali) Kévin Lucien Zohi		(substituted on) 105'
FW	29	(Cape Verde) Nuno da Costa		(substituted on) 81'
Manager:
(France) Thierry Laurey

GK	16	(France) Marc-Aurèle Caillard
RB	25	(France) Cheick Traoré
CB	15	(France) Jérémy Sorbon (c)
CB	29	(France) Christophe Kerbrat
LB	5	(Portugal) Pedro Rebocho
CM	6	(South Africa) Lebogang Phiri	(yellow card) 24'
CM	21	(Gabon) Didier Ndong
RW	10	(France) Nicolas Benezet	(yellow card) 70'	(substituted off) 86'
AM	7	(France) Ludovic Blas		(substituted off) 98'
LW	11	(France) Marcus Thuram
CF	26	(France) Nolan Roux		(substituted off) 67'
Substitutes:
GK	1	(Sweden) Karl-Johan Johnsson
DF	3	(Senegal) Papy Djilobodji
DF	20	(Cameroon) Félix Eboa Eboa
MF	19	(France) Mehdi Merghem
MF	22	(France) Étienne Didot		(substituted on) 98'
FW	9	(France) Alexandre Mendy		(substituted on) 67'
FW	23	(France) Ronny Rodelin		(substituted on) 86'
Manager:
(France) Jocelyn Gourvennec

Man of the Match:
Bingourou Kamara (Strasbourg)

Assistant referees:
Stéphan Luzi
Aurélien Drouet
Fourth official:
Johan Hamel
Video assistant referee:
Jérôme Brisard
Assistant video assistant referee:
Hakim Ben El Hadj

Match rules

- 90 minutes.
- 30 minutes of extra time if necessary.
- Penalty shoot-out if scores still level.
- Seven named substitutes.
- Maximum of three substitutions, with a fourth allowed in extra time.

== See also ==
- 2019 Coupe de France final
- 2018–19 En Avant de Guingamp season
- 2018–19 RC Strasbourg season
