= Karl-Johan Johnsson =

Swedish footballer (born 1990)

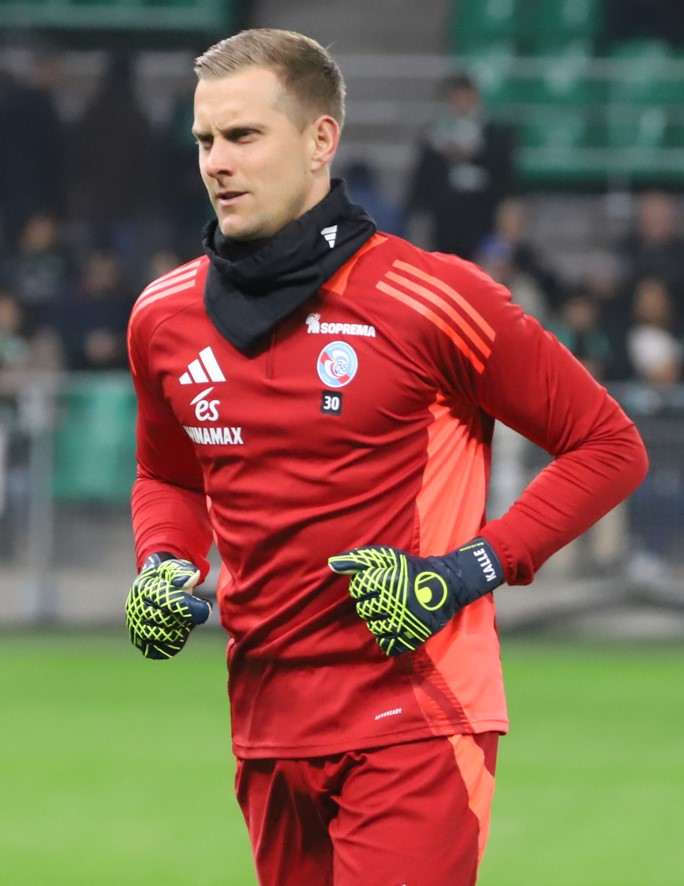
- Karl-Johan Johnsson with Strasbourg in 2024.

Personal information
- Full name: Karl-Johan Anton Johnsson
- Date of birth: 28 January 1990 (age 36)
- Place of birth: Laholm, Sweden
- Height: 1.87 m (6 ft 2 in)
- Position: Goalkeeper

Youth career
- –2008: Ränneslövs GIF
- 2005–2008: Halmstads BK

Senior career*
Years	Team	Apps	(Gls)
2008–2012	Halmstads BK	67	(0)
2013–2014	NEC	30	(0)
2014–2016	Randers	64	(0)
2016–2019	Guingamp	92	(0)
2019–2023	Copenhagen	56	(0)
2023–2024	Bordeaux	22	(0)
2024–2026	Strasbourg	4	(0)

International career^{‡}
2007–2009	Sweden U19	4	(0)
2009–2012	Sweden U21	17	(0)
2012–2021	Sweden	9	(0)
- * Club domestic league appearances and goals as of 17 May 2026 ‡ National team caps and goals as of 23:03, 19 June 2021 (UTC)

Karl-Johan Anton Johnsson (born 28 January 1990) is a Swedish professional footballer who plays as a goalkeeper.

Starting off his career in Sweden with Halmstads BK, Johnsson has gone on to represent NEC, Randers, and Guingamp before signing with Copenhagen in 2019. A full international for the Sweden national team between 2012 and 2021, he was a squad player for his country at the 2018 FIFA World Cup as well as UEFA Euro 2020.

== Club career ==
=== Halmstads BK ===
In 2005, at the age of 15, Johnsson moved to Halmstads BK after beginning his career at Ränneslövs GIF. When goalkeeper Marcus Sahlman was loaned to Trelleborgs FF Johnsson was picked up as third choice goalkeeper on the senior team and he made his game debut on 24 August 2008 against Djurgårdens IF when Magnus Bahne was forced to leave the field during halftime. On 20 November 2008, it was reported that Johansson would go to Manchester, England, for a week and join Manchester City during training. As Conny Johansson retired and Marcus Sahlman left for Tromsø IL, Karl-Johan was made second choice goalkeeper for the 2009 season.

During the 2010 season Johnsson became second choice behind Robin Malmqvist. The 2011 season became turbulent, at first Halmstads BK appointed Josep Clotet Ruiz as new manager of the club, this saw changes among the goalkeepers as Malmqvist was loaned out to Tromsø IL in Norway and Spanish keeper Nauzet Pérez was brought in as first choice, however poor performance and problems with adapting to the Swedish lifestyle saw Pérez depart the club before half the season was played, with his departure Johnsson was appointed first choice as goalkeeper at the club.

=== NEC Nijmegen ===
On 5 November 2012, Halmstads BK announced that Johnsson would leave the club as a Bosman for Dutch club NEC when the transfer window opened on 1 January 2013.

=== Randers ===
On 11 July 2014, Johnsson signed for the Danish Superliga team Randers FC on a 3-year-contract.

=== Guingamp ===
On 28 June 2016, Johnsson signed with the French Ligue 1 team Guingamp. In the 2018–19 Coupe de la Ligue quarter-finals, Johnsson played the full 90 minutes as Guingamp eliminated PSG and thereby ended their 43 games-long unbeaten streak. He was an unused substitute in the 2019 Coupe de la Ligue final.

=== Copenhagen ===
On 12 July 2019, Copenhagen confirmed, that they had signed Johnsson on a four-year contract. On 10 August 2020, Johnsson made 13 saves in a 1–0 loss to Manchester United in the 2019–20 UEFA Europa League quarter-finals – the most saves in a Europa League game by a goalkeeper since 2009. On 3 June 2023, his departure from the club was confirmed.

== International career ==
Johnsson represented Sweden at U19 level before moving up to the Sweden U21 team and debuting against the Slovakia U21 team in 2009. Over time Johnsson was able to work himself into becoming the first choice goalkeeper in the U21 team.

Despite Halmstads BK's poor performance in the 2011 Allsvenskan with ended with Halmstad being relegated, Johnsson was called up to the Sweden national team for the 2012 January tour against Qatar and Bahrain. Missing out on the game against Bahrain, he then came on as a substitute at halftime against Qatar, making his senior team debut.

In May 2018 he was named in Sweden's 23-man squad for the 2018 FIFA World Cup in Russia. He was also included in Sweden's 26-man squad for UEFA Euro 2020.

== Career statistics ==
=== Club ===
As of match played 24 August 2025

Appearances and goals by club, season and competition
Club	Season	League			Cup		League cup		Europe		Other		Total	
Club	Season	Division	Apps	Goals	Apps	Goals	Apps	Goals	Apps	Goals	Apps	Goals	Apps	Goals
Halmstad	2009	Allsvenskan	3	0	2	0	—		—		—		5	0
Halmstad	2010	Allsvenskan	10	0	1	0	—		—		—		11	0
Halmstad	2011	Allsvenskan	24	0	2	0	—		—		—		26	0
Halmstad	2012	Superettan	30	0	—		—		—		2	0	32	0
Halmstad	Total		67	0	5	0	—		—		2	0	74	0
NEC	2012–13	Eredivisie	1	0	—		—		—		—		1	0
NEC	2013–14	Eredivisie	29	0	4	0	—		—		2	0	35	0
NEC	Total		30	0	4	0	—		—		2	0	36	0
Randers	2014–15	Danish Superliga	32	0	1	0	—		—		—		33	0
Randers	2015–16	Danish Superliga	32	0	1	0	—		4 (Note: Appearances in UEFA Europa League)	0	—		37	0
Randers	Total		64	0	2	0	—		4	0	–		70	0
Guingamp	2016–17	Ligue 1	37	0	5	0	0	0	—		—		42	0
Guingamp	2017–18	Ligue 1	38	0	2	0	0	0	—		—		40	0
Guingamp	2018–19	Ligue 1	17	0	2	0	2	0	—		—		21	0
Guingamp	Total		92	0	9	0	2	0	—		—		103	0
Copenhagen	2019–20	Danish Superliga	29	0	1	0	—		12 (Note: 11 appearances in UEFA Europa League, 1 appearance in UEFA Champions League)	0	—		42	0
Copenhagen	2020–21	Danish Superliga	23	0	1	0	—		3 (Note: Appearances in UEFA Europa League)	0	—		27	0
Copenhagen	2021–22	Danish Superliga	0	0	1	0	—		3 (Note: Appearances in UEFA Europa Conference League)	0	—		4	0
Copenhagen	2022–23	Danish Superliga	4	0	1	0	—		0	0	—		5	0
Copenhagen	Total		56	0	4	0	—		18	0	—		78	0
Bordeaux	2023–24	Ligue 2	22	0	2	0	—		—		—		24	0
Strasbourg	2024–25	Ligue 1	3	0	3	0	—		—		—		6	0
Strasbourg	2025–26	Ligue 1	1	0	0	0	—		1 (Note: Appearances in UEFA Conference League)	0	—		2	0
Strasbourg	Total		4	0	3	0	—		1	0	—		8	0
Career total			337	0	29	0	2	0	23	0	4	0	395	0

=== International ===
As of match played on 31 March 2021.

Appearances and goals by national team and year
National team	Year	Apps	Goals
Sweden	2012	1	0
Sweden	2013	0	0
Sweden	2014	0	0
Sweden	2015	1	0
Sweden	2016	1	0
Sweden	2017	1	0
Sweden	2018	3	0
Sweden	2019	0	0
Sweden	2020	1	0
Sweden	2021	1	0
Total		9	0

== Honours ==
Guingamp

- Coupe de la Ligue runner-up: 2018–19

Copenhagen

- Danish Superliga: 2021–22
- Danish Cup: 2022–23

Individual

- Tipsbladet Det Gyldne Bur: 2015
- UEFA Europa League Squad of the Season: 2019–20
