= Cheick Traoré =

Footballer (born 1995)

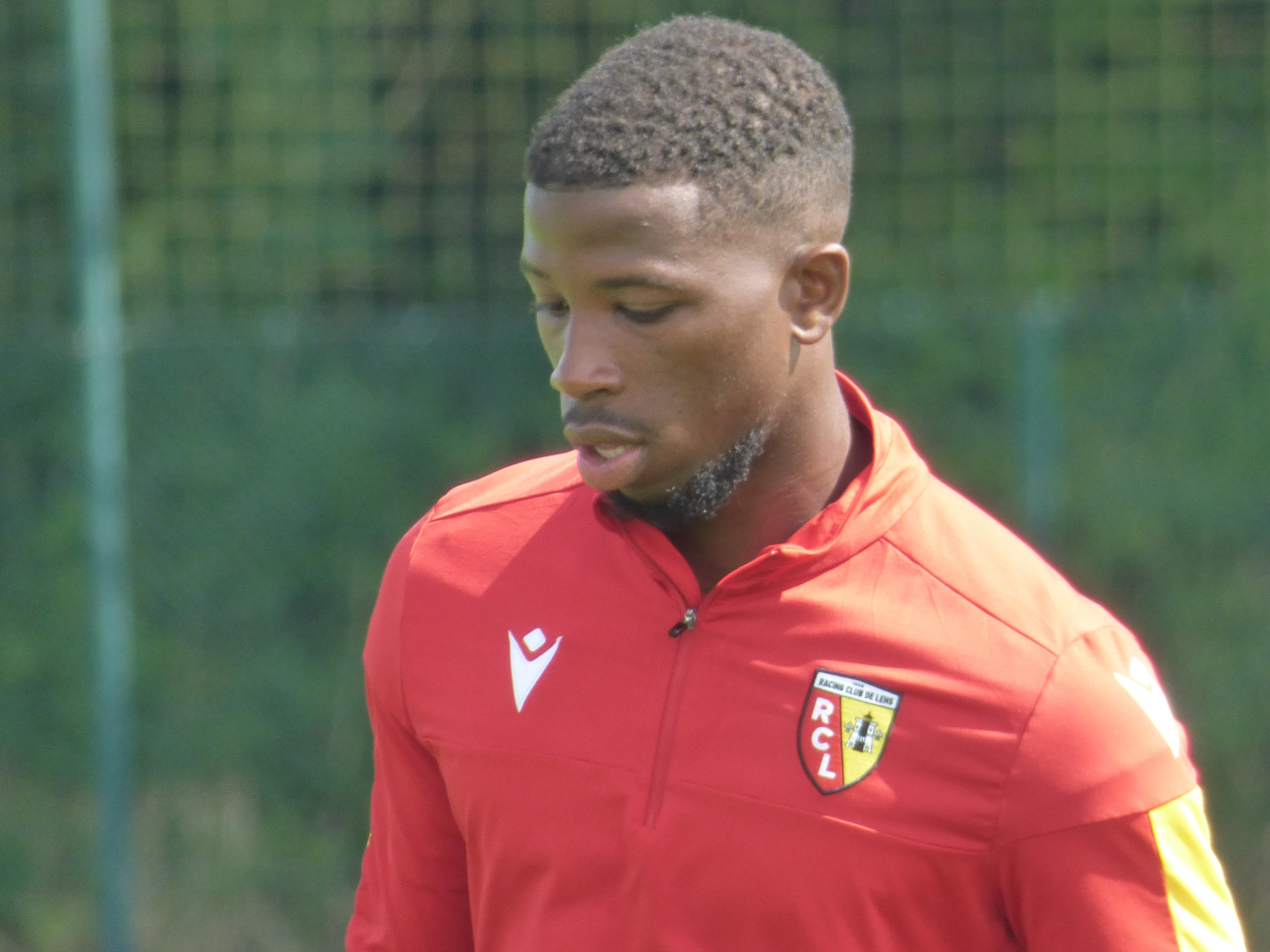
- Traoré with Lens in 2020

Personal information
- Full name: Cheick Omar Traoré
- Date of birth: 31 March 1995 (age 31)
- Place of birth: Pierrefitte-sur-Seine, France
- Height: 1.74 m (5 ft 9 in)
- Position: Right-back

Youth career
- 2001–2006: Pierrefitte FC
- 2006–2008: Paris Saint-Germain
- 2008–2012: Entente SSG
- 2012–2013: Sedan
- 2013: Caen

Senior career*
Years	Team	Apps	(Gls)
2013–2015	Caen II	38	(0)
2015–2016	→ Avranches (loan)	29	(0)
2016–2017	Châteauroux	26	(0)
2017–2019	Guingamp	20	(0)
2017–2018	→ Châteauroux (loan)	31	(0)
2019–2021	Lens	12	(0)
2021–2024	Dijon	66	(1)
2023–2024	Dijon II	12	(1)
2024	Buzău	4	(0)
2025	Al-Faisaly	9	(0)
2025–2026	Paris 13 Atletico	18	(0)

International career
2019–2022	Mali	2	(0)
- * Club domestic league appearances and goals as of 23 June 2026

Cheick Omar Traoré (born 31 March 1995) is a professional footballer who plays as a right-back. Born in France, he played for the Mali national team.

== Early life ==
In his youth, Cheick Traoré played along his brother Baba in his native Pierrefitte-sur-Seine. He is also a professional footballer.

== Club career ==
Traoré signed his first professional contract with Caen on 16 June 2015. He moved to Avranches on loan, and after a successful stint, was transferred to Châteauroux. Traoré worked his way into the starting lineup at Châteauroux and earned a transfer to Ligue 1 club Guingamp, and was loaned back to Châteauroux for the 2017–18 season. He made his professional debut for Châteauroux in a 3–2 Ligue 2 win over Brest on 28 July 2017.

From 2019 to 2021, Traoré was a Lens player, making a total of 15 appearances for the club. On 28 June 2021, he signed a three-year contract with Ligue 2 club Dijon.

== International career ==
Born in France, Traoré is Malian by descent. He debuted for the Mali national team in a 2–1 friendly loss to South Africa on 13 October 2019.

== Career statistics ==
As of match played 30 July 2020

Appearances and goals by club, season and competition
Club	Season	League			National Cup		League Cup		Other		Total	
Club	Season	Division	Apps	Goals	Apps	Goals	Apps	Goals	Apps	Goals	Apps	Goals
Caen II	2013–14	CFA 2	16	0	—		—		—		16	0
Caen II	2014–15	CFA 2	22	0	—		—		—		22	0
Caen II	Total		38	0	—		—		—		38	0
Avranches (loan)	2015–16	National	29	0	2	0	0	0	0	0	31	0
Châteauroux	2016–17	National	26	0	2	0	3	0	0	0	31	0
Châteauroux (loan)	2017–18	Ligue 2	31	0	3	0	1	0	0	0	35	0
Guingamp	2018–19	Ligue 1	20	0	1	0	5	0	0	0	26	0
Lens	2019–20	Ligue 2	10	0	1	0	2	0	0	0	13	0
Lens	2020–21	Ligue 1	2	0	0	0	—		0	0	2	0
Lens	Total		12	0	1	0	2	0	0	0	15	0
Dijon	2021–22	Ligue 2	10	0	0	0	—		0	0	0	0
Career total			156	0	9	0	11	0	0	0	176	0

== Honours ==
Guingamp

- Coupe de la Ligue runner-up: 2018–19
