= Lucas Deaux =

French footballer (born 1988)

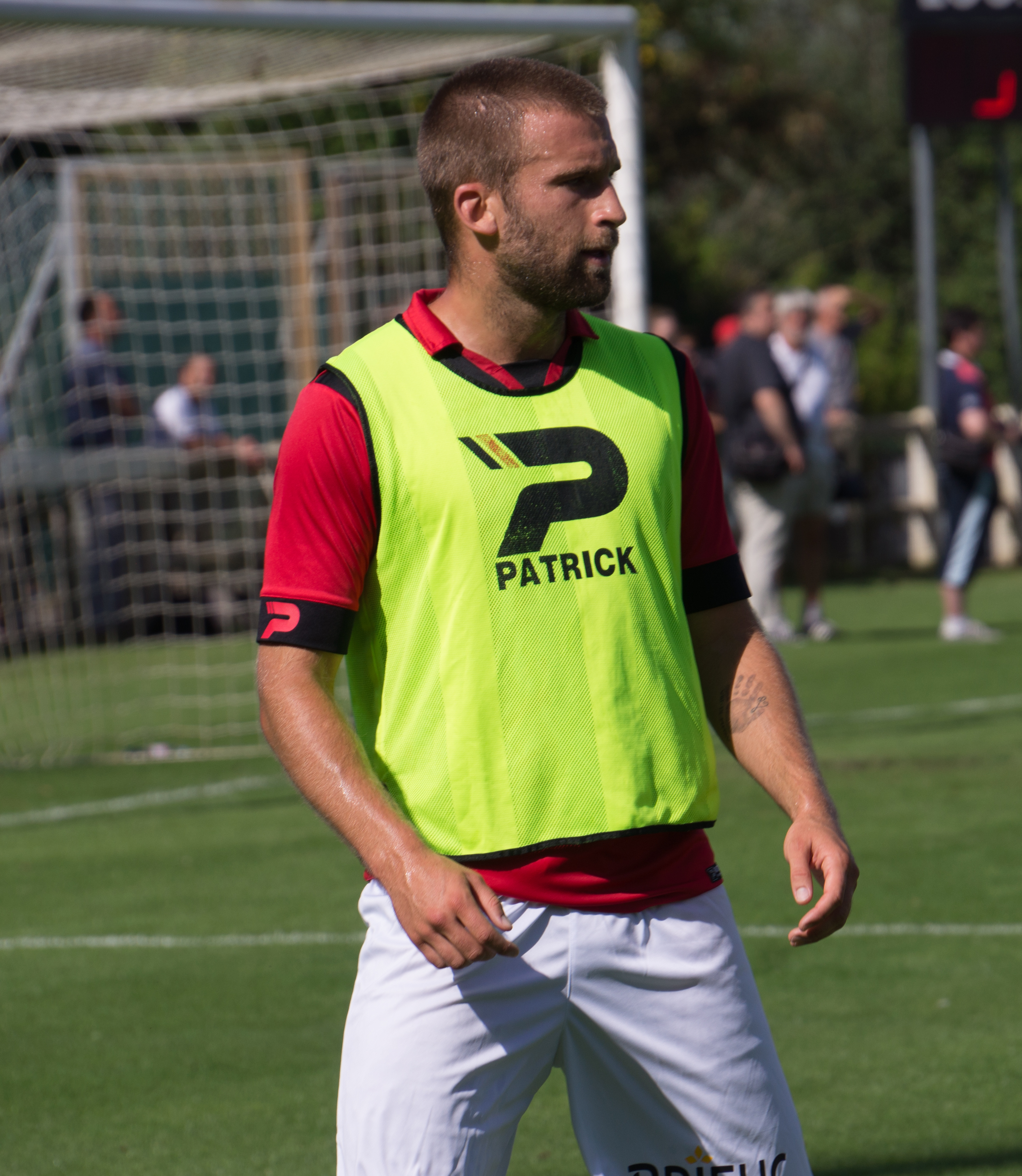
- Deaux in 2016

Personal information
- Date of birth: 26 December 1988 (age 37)
- Place of birth: Reims, France
- Height: 1.88 m (6 ft 2 in)
- Position: Midfielder

Senior career*
| Years | Team | Apps | (Gls) |
| 2004–2009 | Reims B | | |
| 2006–2012 | Reims | 117 | (7) |
| 2012–2015 | Nantes | 119 | (1) |
| 2016 | Gent | 5 | (0) |
| 2016–2019 | Guingamp | 86 | (8) |
| 2019–2021 | Nîmes | 42 | (3) |
| 2021–2023 | Dijon | 28 | (0) |
| 2021–2023 | Dijon II | 2 | (0) |
| 2023 | Nancy | 11 | (0) |
- * Club domestic league appearances and goals as of 23:52, 3 July 2024 (UTC)

Lucas Deaux (born 26 December 1988) is a French professional footballer who plays as a midfielder.

== Career ==
Deaux scored his first Ligue 1 goal for Nantes against Rennes on 29 September 2013 in a 3–1 away win for Nantes.

In June 2016, he joined Guingamp on a three-year contract from Belgian side Gent.

On 29 July 2021, Deaux signed a two-year contract with Dijon. In the first half of the 2022–23 season, he struggled with injuries and made nine appearances. With his contract set to expire in June, Deaux left Dijon on 13 January to join Nancy in the Championnat National. He made a total of 32 appearances across all competitions in one-and-a-half years at Dijon.

Deaux signed with Nancy on a 18-month contract. He was suspended for Nancy's final match of the season with the club in danger of being relegated. He left the club in the summer.

== Honours ==
Guingamp

- Coupe de la Ligue runner-up: 2018–19
