= Marc-Aurèle Caillard =

French footballer (born 1994)

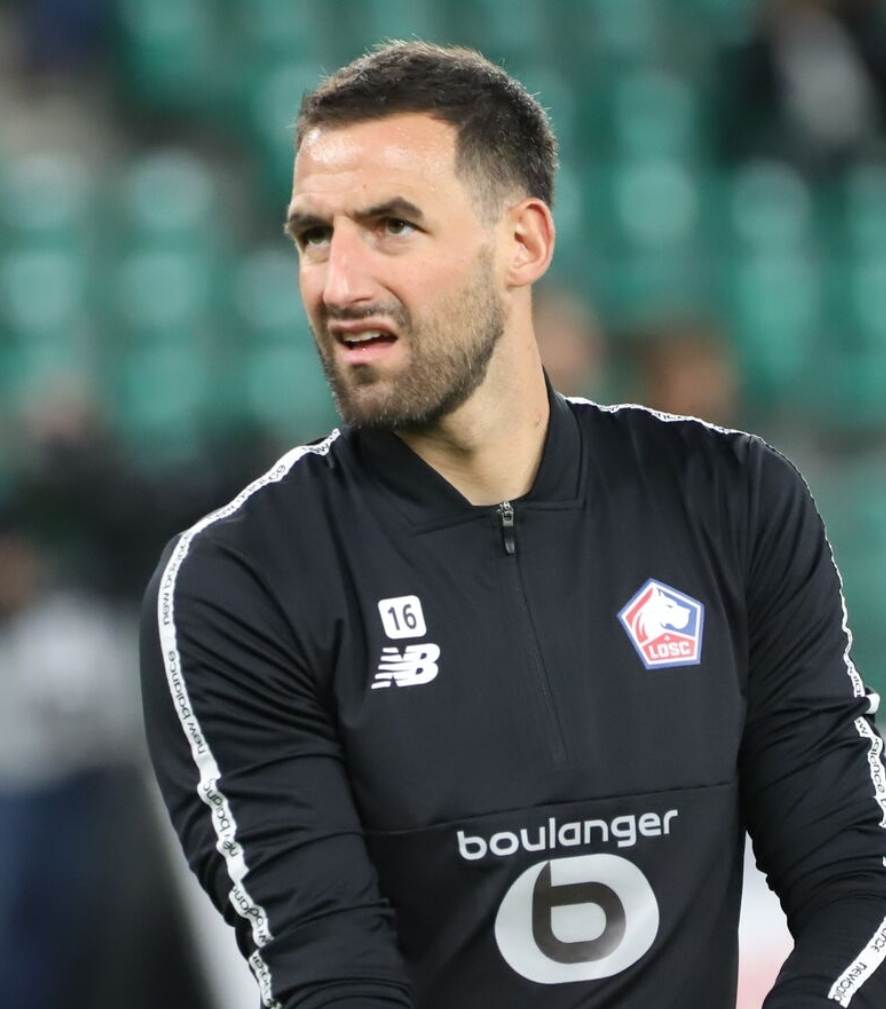
- Caillard with Lille in 2024

Personal information
- Date of birth: 12 May 1994 (age 32)
- Place of birth: Melun, France
- Height: 1.91 m (6 ft 3 in)
- Position: Goalkeeper

Youth career
- 2000–2001: CVS Entente
- 2001–2007: US Moissy-Cramayel
- 2007–2009: CSF Brétigny
- 2009–2010: INF Clairefontaine
- 2010–2011: Monaco

Senior career*
Years	Team	Apps	(Gls)
2011–2015	Monaco B	40	(0)
2012	Monaco	1	(0)
2015	Clermont B	1	(0)
2015–2017	Clermont	26	(0)
2017–2018	Guingamp B	6	(0)
2017–2020	Guingamp	43	(0)
2020–2024	Metz B	7	(0)
2020–2024	Metz	26	(0)
2024–2026	Lille	0	(0)

International career
2009	France U16	1	(0)
2012	France U18	1	(0)
- * Club domestic league appearances and goals as of 17 May 2026

Marc-Aurèle Caillard (born 12 May 1994) is a French professional footballer who plays as a goalkeeper.

== Career ==
After being a regular for the reserves, Caillard made his debut for Monaco in a 2–0 away loss to Reims in Ligue 2. The following season, Monaco won the Ligue 2, while Caillard was an unused substitute in two matches.

He signed with Clermont Foot following the expiration of his Monaco contract in July 2015.

In June 2017, Caillard signed a one-year contract with Guingamp. On 29 January 2019, he came on as a substitute in the penalty shootout for Guingamp in their Coupe de la Ligue semifinal against Monaco. Caillard saved two penalties and Guingamp advanced 5–4, sending the team to their first Coupe de La Ligue final in the team's history.

Caillard joined Metz on 20 July 2020 on a free transfer. On 30 August 2024, he joined Lille OSC until June 2025, on a free transfer.

== Career statistics ==
As of match played 10 March 2024

Appearances and goals by club, season and competition
Club	Season	League			National cup		League cup		Continental		Other		Total	
Club	Season	Division	Apps	Goals	Apps	Goals	Apps	Goals	Apps	Goals	Apps	Goals	Apps	Goals
Monaco B	2010–11	CFA	1	0	—		—		—		—		0	0
Monaco B	2011–12	CFA	10	0	—		—		—		—		0	0
Monaco B	2012–13	CFA	2	0	—		—		—		—		1	0
Monaco B	2013–14	CFA	16	0	—		—		—		—		8	0
Monaco B	2014–15	CFA	11	0	—		—		—		—		0	0
Monaco B	Total		40	0	—		—		—		—		40	0
Monaco	2011–12	Ligue 2	1	0	0	0	0	0	—		—		1	0
Monaco	2012–13	Ligue 2	0	0	0	0	0	0	—		—		0	0
Monaco	2013–14	Ligue 1	0	0	0	0	0	0	—		—		0	0
Monaco	2014–15	Ligue 1	0	0	0	0	0	0	0	0	—		0	0
Monaco	Total		1	0	0	0	0	0	0	0	—		1	0
Clermont B	2015–16	CFA 2	1	0	—		—		—		—		1	0
Clermont	2015–16	Ligue 2	9	0	2	0	2	0	—		—		13	0
Clermont	2016–17	Ligue 2	17	0	3	0	3	0	—		—		23	0
Clermont	Total		26	0	5	0	5	0	—		—		36	0
Guingamp B	2017–18	National 3	3	0	—		—		—		—		3	0
Guingamp B	2018–19	National 3	3	0	—		—		—		—		3	0
Guingamp B	Total		3	0	—		—		—		—		6	0
Guingamp	2017–18	Ligue 1	0	0	0	0	1	0	—		—		1	0
Guingamp	2018–19	Ligue 1	21	0	1	0	4	0	—		—		26	0
Guingamp	2019–20	Ligue 2	22	0	0	0	0	0	—		—		22	0
Guingamp	Total		43	0	1	0	5	0	—		—		49	0
Metz B	2020–21	National 2	1	0	—		—		—		—		1	0
Metz B	2022–23	National 2	2	0	—		—		—		—		2	0
Metz B	2023–24	National 3	4	0	—		—		—		—		4	0
Metz B	Total		7	0	—		—		—		—		7	0
Metz	2020–21	Ligue 1	5	0	2	0	—		—		—		7	0
Metz	2021–22	Ligue 1	19	0	1	0	—		—		—		20	0
Metz	2022–23	Ligue 2	2	0	0	0	—		—		—		2	0
Metz	2023–24	Ligue 1	0	0	0	0	—		—		—		0	0
Metz	Total		26	0	3	0	—		—		—		29	0
Career total			147	0	9	0	10	0	0	0	0	0	166	0

== Honours ==
Monaco

- Ligue 2: 2012–13

Guingamp

- Coupe de la Ligue runner-up: 2018–19
