= Anthony Rogie =

French footballer (born 1991)

Personal information
- Date of birth: 2 June 1991 (age 35)
- Place of birth: Douai, France
- Height: 1.86 m (6 ft 1 in)
- Position: Midfielder

Team information
- Current team: Wasquehal
- Number: 8

Youth career
- 2000–2012: Lens

Senior career*
Years	Team	Apps	(Gls)
2010–2013	Lens B	74	(4)
2012–2013	Lens	1	(0)
2013–2019	Quevilly-Rouen	159	(10)
2018	Quevilly-Rouen B	1	(0)
2019–2020	Rouen	12	(2)
2020–2021	C'Chartres	3	(0)
2020–2021	C'Chartres B	1	(0)
2021–2023	Sedan	38	(0)
2023–	Wasquehal	4	(0)
- * Club domestic league appearances and goals as of 17:34, 14 January 2024 (UTC)

Anthony Rogie (born 2 June 1991) is a French professional footballer who plays as a midfielder for Championnat National 1 club Wasquehal.

== Professional career ==
A youth academy member of Lens, made his professional debut for Lens in a Ligue 2 1–0 win over Chamois Niortais on 5 October 2012. He transferred to Quevilly-Rouen and helped them to two successive promotions, signing his a pro contract in 2017 when they reached the Ligue 2.

On 11 June 2021, he joined Sedan in Championnat National.
