= Lebogang Phiri =

South African footballer (born 1994)

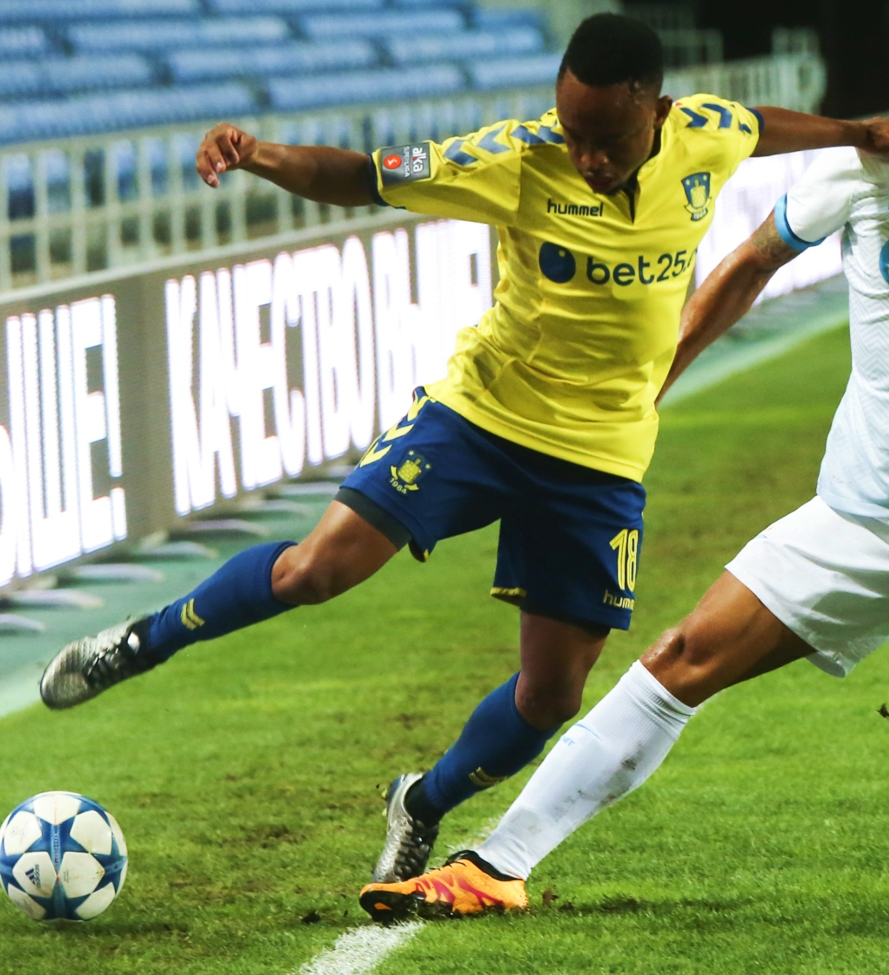
- Phiri with Brøndby in 2016

Personal information
- Full name: Lebogang Lelani Phiri
- Date of birth: 9 November 1994 (age 32)
- Place of birth: Johannesburg, South Africa
- Height: 1.73 m (5 ft 8 in)
- Position: Central midfielder

Youth career
- 2004–2005: Real Madrid (SA)
- 2005–2008: Balfour Park
- 2008–2009: Shooting Stars Sports Concepts
- 2009–2013: Bidvest Wits
- 2013: Brøndby

Senior career*
Years	Team	Apps	(Gls)
2013–2017	Brøndby	109	(7)
2017–2021	Guingamp	78	(1)
2021–2024	Çaykur Rizespor	16	(0)
2022–2023	→ Paris FC (loan)	17	(0)
2024–2025	Guingamp	25	(0)
2024	Guingamp II	2	(1)

International career^{‡}
2016	South Africa U23	3	(1)
2015–2019	South Africa	8	(2)
- * Club domestic league appearances and goals as of 17 May 2025 ‡ National team caps and goals as of 17 November 2019

Lebogang Lelani Phiri (born 9 November 1994) is a South African professional soccer player. Phiri is capable of playing in several midfield positions, but is usually deployed by his club and national sides as a central midfielder, in the role of a deep-lying playmaker.

== Career ==
=== Brøndby IF ===
==== 2012–13 season ====
Phiri joined Brøndby IF's under-19 team on 8 February 2013 on a long-term eighteen months loan from the youth academy of South African side Bidvest Wits. He soon became a member of the first team, claiming a spot as a defensive midfielder in the line-up, due to injuries and suspensions. He made his debut (in jersey number 34) in the away game against OB on 28 April 2013 which was won 2–1. Phiri retained his spot for the remaining four games of the season in which Brøndby were undefeated while scoring twice. On 20 May 2013, he scored the last-minute winning goal against AC Horsens that made Brøndby avoid relegation from the Danish Superliga.

==== 2013–14 season ====
Phiri signed 28 June 2013 a new four-year contract which tied him to the club until the summer 2017. He was officially promoted to the first team and handed jersey number 18.

He had a rough start on the season as Brøndby IF decided to sign Martin Ørnskov as an reinforcement and replacement for him in defensive midfield. But Phiri found himself in the starting line-up after three matches with only 1 point and thereby pushed the team captain Mikkel Thygesen away from the defensive midfield in Brøndby's 4–2–3–1 system in the 2–2 away draw against Viborg on 9 August 2013. But yet again Phiri found himself back on the bench as Brøndby IF signed former Danish international Thomas Kahlenberg. He returned to the starting line-up in November playing in a 3–0 home victory against Aarhus GF.

==== 2014–15 season ====
On 31 July 2014, Phiri made his Europa League debut in the starting line-up in a 3–0 away defeat against Belgian side Club Brugge. Following a winter mid-season preparation with much playtime Phiri managed to settle as one of manager Thomas Frank's favourites which was rewarded with a call-up to the South Africa national team. He made his debut coming off the bench during the second half in the Bafana's 3–1 victory over Swaziland on 25 March 2015 which earned him a slot on the Wall of Honour at Brøndby Stadium.

==== 2015–16 season ====
Phiri started the season with a slot among the starting-11 in a 9–0 home victory against San Marino side A.C. Juvenes/Dogana in the Europa League qualification.

Phiri chose a new agent, former Danish international Søren Lerby to represent him during the forthcoming career decisions and contract negotiations. On 20 March 2016, Phiri was named MoM by both sponsors and supporters after a performance against Esbjerg fB. Afterwards, he revealed that he felt ready to take the next step in his career while being open for a contract extension with Brøndby IF.

A week later, Phiri got his South Africa under-23 debut in the starting line-up in the 3–1 defeat against Brazil under-23 during the Olympic Games 2016 preparation before being substituted off during the half time break.

Phiri crowned his season by winning the leading Brøndby dedicated media 3point.dk player of the season award, a prize based on the readers' votes after each game in the season. He had twice as many points as the club legend Daniel Agger who came in third after Frederik Rønnow.

==== 2016–17 season ====
During the pre-season Phiri represented South Africa U23 in the COSAFA Castle cup in Namibia where he started and led his team to a 3–2 win against Botswana. He scored his first U23 goal (2–1) in the 5–1 semi-final victory against Swaziland.

Phiri started contract negotiations with Brøndby after returning from COSAFA Castle Cup. Both the club and Phiri stated a common interest in an agreement but Phiri also said that he was keeping his options open. During the negotiations he revealed that Brøndby had rejected an offer from the Austria side Rapid Vienna. After weeks of negotiations Brøndby decided to put pressure on Phiri as they rejected his wish of representing his country at the Olympics 2016 in Rio without a signed contract extension.

On 28 May 2017, Brøndby announced that Phiri would leave the club at the end of his contract due to his ambition for a new challenge.

=== Guingamp ===
On 30 May 2017, EA Guingamp announced that Phiri had penned a four-year contract tying him to the club until the summer 2021.

=== Çaykur Rizespor ===
Phiri joined Süper Lig club Çaykur Rizespor on a three-year contract in July 2021.

On 29 June 2022, Çaykur Rizespor announced Phiri's loan to Paris FC for the 2022–23 season.

In the first half of the 2023–24 season, before moving to Guingamp in the winter transfer window, he did not make an appearance for Çaykur Rizespor.

=== Second spell at Guingamp ===
On 1 February 2024, the last day of the French transfer window, Phiri returned to former club Guingamp, playing in Ligue 2. He signed a contract until the end of the season with an option for another year.

== Personal life ==
Phiri hails from Alexandra and is the son of former Vaal Professionals player Esau Phiri.

== Career statistics ==
As of 28 June 2024

Appearances and goals by club, season and competition
Club	Season	League			Cup		Continental		Other		Total	
Club	Season	Division	Apps	Goals	Apps	Goals	Apps	Goals	Apps	Goals	Apps	Goals
Brøndby IF	2012–13	Superliga	5	2	0	0	—		—		5	2
Brøndby IF	2013–14	Superliga	21	1	0	0	—		—		21	1
Brøndby IF	2014–15	Superliga	30	1	2	1	2	0	—		34	2
Brøndby IF	2015–16	Superliga	28	3	4	0	8	0	—		40	3
Brøndby IF	2016–17	Superliga	25	0	3	0	7	0	9 (Note: Appearance(s) in Superligaen Championship round)	1	52	1
Brøndby IF	Total		109	7	9	1	17	0	9	1	144	9
Guingamp	2017–18	Ligue 1	22	0	3	0	—		—		25	0
Guingamp	2018–19	Ligue 1	24	0	7	0	—		—		31	0
Guingamp	2019–20	Ligue 2	25	1	0	0	—		—		25	1
Guingamp	Total		71	1	10	0	0	0	0	0	81	1
Çaykur Rizespor	2021–22	Süper Lig	16	0	1	0	—		—		17	0
Paris FC (loan)	2022–23	Ligue 2	17	0	2	0	—		—		19	0
Guingamp	2023–24	Ligue 2	9	0	0	0	—		—		9	0
Career total			222	8	22	1	17	0	9	1	270	10

=== International ===
As of matches played on 10 August 2020

Appearances and goals by national team and year
National team	Year	Apps	Goals
South Africa	2015	1	0
South Africa	2016	3	1
South Africa	2017	1	0
South Africa	2018	1	0
South Africa	2019	2	1
Total		8	2

Scores and results list South Africa's goal tally first, score column indicates score after each Phiri goal.

List of international goals scored by Lebogang Phiri
No.	Date	Venue	Opponent	Score	Result	Competition
1	22 June 2016	Sam Nujoma Stadium, Windhoek, Namibia	Swaziland	2–1	5–1	2016 COSAFA Cup
2	17 November 2019	Orlando Stadium, Johannesburg, South Africa	Sudan	1–0	1–0	2021 Africa Cup of Nations qualification

== Honours ==
South Africa

- COSAFA Cup:2016

Guingamp

- Coupe de la Ligue runner-up: 2018–19
