= Nolan Roux =

French footballer (born 1988)

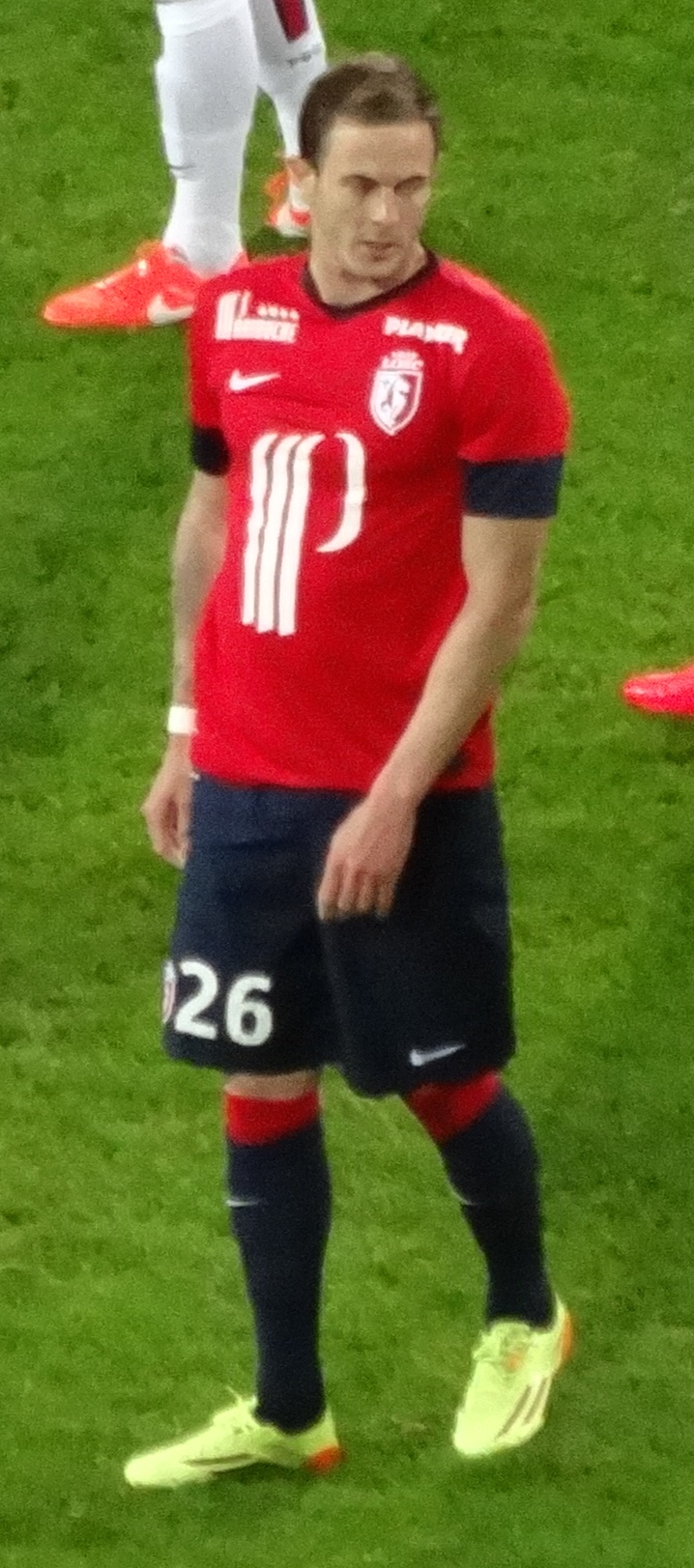
- Roux playing for Lille

Personal information
- Date of birth: 1 March 1988 (age 38)
- Place of birth: Compiègne, France
- Height: 1.82 m (6 ft 0 in)
- Position: Striker

Youth career
- 1999–2002: Caen
- 2002–2004: Beauvais
- 2004–2008: Lens

Senior career*
Years	Team	Apps	(Gls)
2008–2009	Lens	1	(0)
2009–2012	Brest	80	(25)
2012–2015	Lille	112	(30)
2015–2017	Saint-Étienne	50	(13)
2017–2018	Metz	35	(15)
2018–2020	Guingamp	46	(6)
2020–2021	Nîmes	26	(2)
2021–2023	Châteauroux	48	(6)
Total		398	(97)

International career
2010	France U21	2	(2)
- * Club domestic league appearances and goals as of 19 May 2023

Nolan Roux (born 1 March 1988) is a former French professional footballer who played as a striker. He is a former French youth international, having previously played for the France under-21 team.

== Club career ==
Roux scored 15 goals in 34 games for Brest in Ligue 2 during the 2009–2010 season and 6 goals in 28 games in Ligue 1 during the 2010–11 season.

On 21 January 2012, he joined defending champions Lille from Brest on a four-and-a-half-year deal.

In 2015, Roux left Lille to sign a three-year deal with Ligue 1 side Saint-Étienne.

On 20 July 2017, he signed a three-year deal to join league rivals Metz for an undisclosed fee. In the 2017–18 Ligue 1 season, Roux scored 15 goals for Metz despite the club finishing last and being relegated to Ligue 2.

On 19 June 2018, Roux signed a two-year deal to join Guingamp.

On 1 May 2024, Roux officially announced his retirement.

== International career ==
Roux was a French youth international having made his debut with the under-21 team on 2 March 2010. He has scored twice in two appearances.

== Career statistics ==
As of May 2024

Appearances and goals by club, season and competition
Club	Season	League			Coupe de France		Coupe de la Ligue		Continental (Note: Appearances in UEFA Champions League and UEFA Europa League)		Total	
Club	Season	Division	Apps	Goals	Apps	Goals	Apps	Goals	Apps	Goals	Apps	Goals
Lens	2008–09	Ligue 2	1	0	0	0	0	0	—		1	0
Brest	2009–10	Ligue 2	34	15	1	1	1	0	—		36	16
Brest	2010–11	Ligue 1	28	6	0	0	1	0	—		29	6
Brest	2011–12	Ligue 1	18	4	1	0	1	2	—		20	6
Brest	Total		80	25	2	1	3	2	0	0	85	28
Lille	2011–12	Ligue 1	17	5	1	1	0	0	—		18	6
Lille	2012–13	Ligue 1	32	7	2	2	2	1	8	0	44	10
Lille	2013–14	Ligue 1	30	9	2	1	1	0	—		33	10
Lille	2014–15	Ligue 1	33	9	1	0	1	0	8	1	43	10
Lille	Total		112	30	6	4	4	1	16	1	138	36
Saint-Étienne	2015–16	Ligue 1	29	9	4	0	0	0	11	2	44	11
Saint-Étienne	2016–17	Ligue 1	21	4	2	0	0	0	10	1	33	5
Saint-Étienne	Total		50	13	6	0	0	0	21	3	77	16
Metz	2017–18	Ligue 1	35	15	2	1	1	0	—		38	16
Guingamp	2018–19	Ligue 1	26	2	3	1	2	0	—		31	3
Guingamp	2019–20	Ligue 2	14	2	1	0	1	0	—		16	2
Guingamp	Total		40	4	4	1	3	0	0	0	47	5
Nîmes	2019–20	Ligue 1	7	2	0	0	0	0	—		7	2
Nîmes	2020–21	Ligue 1	19	0	1	0	0	0	—		20	0
Nîmes	Total		26	2	1	0	0	0	0	0	27	2
Châteauroux	2021–22	Championnat National	25	3	0	0	0	0	—		25	3
Châteauroux	2022–23	Championnat National	23	3	1	0	0	0	—		24	3
Châteauroux	Total		48	6	1	0	0	0	0	0	49	6
Career total			392	95	22	7	11	3	37	4	462	109

== Personal life ==
Nolan is the son of former professional footballer Bruno Roux.

== Honours ==
Guingamp

- Coupe de la Ligue runner-up: 2018–19
