= Marcus Thuram =

French footballer (born 1997)

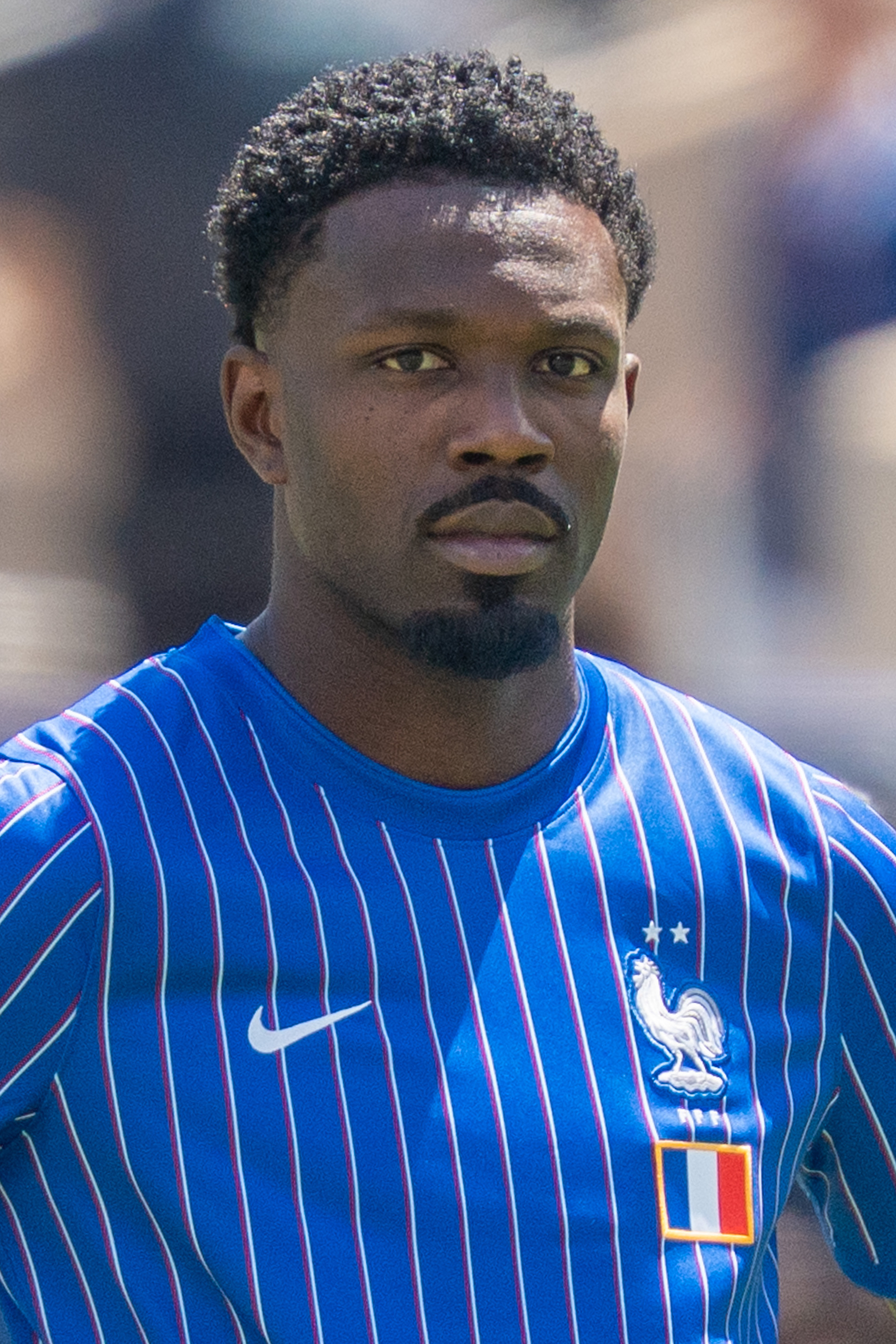
- Thuram with France in 2026

Personal information
- Full name: Marcus Lilian Thuram-Ulien
- Date of birth: 6 August 1997 (age 29)
- Place of birth: Parma, Emilia-Romagna, Italy
- Height: 1.92 m (6 ft 4 in)
- Position: Striker

Team information
- Current team: Inter Milan
- Number: 9

Youth career
- 2007–2010: Olympique de Neuilly
- 2010–2012: Boulogne-Billancourt
- 2012–2014: Sochaux

Senior career*
Years	Team	Apps	(Gls)
2014–2017	Sochaux II	38	(6)
2015–2017	Sochaux	37	(1)
2017–2019	Guingamp	64	(12)
2019–2023	Borussia Mönchengladbach	111	(34)
2023–	Inter Milan	107	(46)

International career^{‡}
2014	France U17	4	(1)
2014–2015	France U18	5	(2)
2015–2016	France U19	15	(3)
2016–2017	France U20	11	(3)
2019	France U21	5	(0)
2020–	France	35	(3)
Medal record
Men's football
Representing France
FIFA World Cup
Runner-up	2022 Qatar
UEFA Nations League
Third place	2025 Germany
UEFA European Under-19 Championship
Winner	2016 Germany
- * Club domestic league appearances and goals as of 22:38, 22 November 2026 (UTC) ‡ National team caps and goals as of 21:35, 23 June 2026 (UTC)

Marcus Lilian Thuram-Ulien (French pronunciation: [maʁkys tyʁam]; born 6 August 1997) is a French professional footballer who plays as a striker for Serie A club Inter Milan and the France national team.

Thuram began his professional career at Sochaux in 2015, where he played in three Ligue 2 seasons, before moving to Guingamp in 2017, spending two years in Ligue 1. He then joined Borussia Mönchengladbach, spending four seasons in Germany, before signing for Inter Milan as a free agent in 2023, and winning the Serie A title in his first season.

Thuram made his senior international debut for France in 2020, and was part of their squads at the UEFA European Championship in 2020 and 2024, and the FIFA World Cup in 2022 and 2026, finishing as runner-up at the 2022 tournament.

== Club career ==
=== Sochaux ===
Thuram started his professional career at Sochaux, where he also played for the club's youth team. He made his Ligue 2 debut on 20 March 2015 against Châteauroux, replacing Edouard Butin on 83 minutes. He played 43 total matches for Sochaux and scored one goal, in a 3–1 loss at Tours on 14 April 2017.

=== Guingamp ===
On 5 July 2017, Thuram joined Ligue 1 club Guingamp for an undisclosed fee. In August 2018, he gained attention for playing against Paris Saint-Germain goalkeeper Gianluigi Buffon, a long-term teammate of his father at Parma and Juventus.

Thuram scored an added-time penalty on 9 January 2019 to eliminate holders PSG from the quarter-finals of the Coupe de la Ligue, having earlier missed from the spot in the 2–1 win at the Parc des Princes. Twenty days later he scored the equaliser in a 2–2 home draw with Monaco in the semi-final, and his attempt in the subsequent penalty shootout was saved by Danijel Subašić though Guingamp nonetheless advanced.

=== Borussia Mönchengladbach ===
==== 2019–20: Debut season ====
On 22 July 2019, Borussia Mönchengladbach announced they had signed Thuram on a four-year deal. The transfer fee paid to Guingamp was reported as €12 million. He was given the number 10 shirt, vacated by Thorgan Hazard after his move to Borussia Dortmund. He made his debut for Gladbach on 9 August in the first round of the DFB-Pokal away to 2. Bundesliga club SV Sandhausen, and scored the only goal. He got his first Bundesliga goals on his fifth appearance on 22 September, scoring both goals of a 2–1 home win over Fortuna Düsseldorf.

On 31 May 2020, Thuram scored twice in a 4–1 win over Union Berlin. He took a knee after his first goal of the match and dedicated the strike in honour of ongoing protests in the United States following the murder of George Floyd.

==== 2021–2023: Later seasons and Champions League qualification ====
On 27 October 2020, Thuram scored twice in a 2–2 draw with Real Madrid in the group stage of the UEFA Champions League. On 19 December, Thuram was sent off for spitting in the face of opponent Stefan Posch as Gladbach fell to a 2–1 defeat to Hoffenheim, and was given a six-match ban and a €40,000 fine. Thuram failed to score in his first 15 Bundesliga matches of the 2021–22 Bundesliga season. He later scored only three goals, one each against Wolfsburg, Stuttgart and Greuther Fürth. As of November 2022, Thuram managed to score 10 goals in 15 Bundesliga matches, in which he equaled his personal best since the debut season. In April 2023, Gladbach's sporting director Roland Virkus confirmed that Thuram would depart the club at the end of the 2022–23 campaign, having chosen not to renew his contract.

=== Inter Milan ===
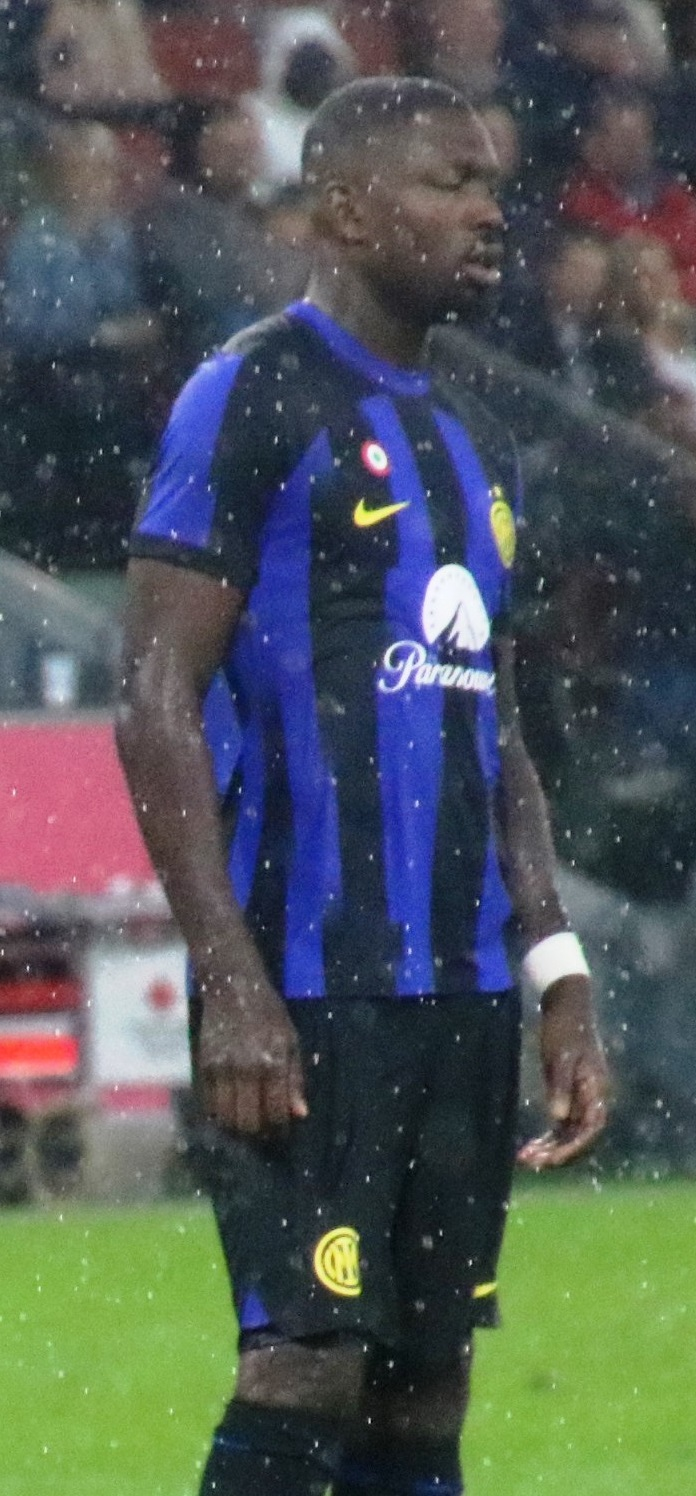
Thuram playing for Inter Milan in 2023

On 1 July 2023, Thuram was officially signed as a free agent by the Serie A team, Inter Milan. His contract with the club is set to last until June 2028. On 3 September, he scored his first goal in a 4–0 win over Fiorentina. On 3 October, he scored his first Champions League goal for the club in a 1–0 victory over Benfica in the group stage, becoming the third Frenchman to score in this competition for Inter after Youri Djorkaeff (1998 vs Sturm Graz) and Patrick Vieira (2006 vs Bayern Munich). He scored 13 goals and added an equal number of assists as Inter won the league in his first season.

== International career ==
Thuram was a member of France U19 which won the 2016 UEFA European Championship. In November 2020, he was called up for the first time to the senior team, ahead of games against Finland, Portugal and Sweden. He debuted on 11 November in a friendly against the Finns, a 2–0 loss at the Stade de France. He was called up to the 26-man French team for the delayed UEFA Euro 2020 in May 2021.

On 14 November 2022, Thuram received a late call-up for the 2022 FIFA World Cup, raising the French squad to 26 players. In the final against Argentina, he and Randal Kolo Muani were brought on in place of Ousmane Dembélé and Olivier Giroud with France losing 2–0 in the 41st minute. Thuram assisted Kylian Mbappé's equalizer to make it 2–2 at the end of regulation time, and was also booked for diving in the penalty area; France lost in a penalty shootout after a 3–3 draw.

On 7 September 2023, Thuram scored his first international goal in a 2–0 win over Ireland during the Euro 2024 qualifying.

On 16 May 2024, Thuram was named in the squad for UEFA Euro 2024.

On 14 May 2026, Thuram was selected in the 26-man squad for the 2026 FIFA World Cup.

== Personal life ==
Thuram is the son of the former French international footballer Lilian Thuram, and the older brother of Juventus and France midfielder Khéphren Thuram. He was born in the Italian city of Parma, in the region of Emilia-Romagna, while his father played for the club, and was named after Jamaican activist Marcus Garvey. Despite his father playing for Juventus and Barcelona, as a child, he supported AC Milan and Real Madrid. Thuram is of Guadeloupean descent through his father.

== Career statistics ==
=== Club ===
As of match played 22 November 2026

Appearances and goals by club, season and competition
Club	Season	League			National cup (Note: Includes Coupe de France, DFB-Pokal, Coppa Italia)		League cup (Note: Includes Coupe de la Ligue)		Europe		Other		Total	
Club	Season	Division	Apps	Goals	Apps	Goals	Apps	Goals	Apps	Goals	Apps	Goals	Apps	Goals
Sochaux II	2013–14	CFA	4	0	—		—		—		—		4	0
Sochaux II	2014–15	CFA	19	3	—		—		—		—		19	3
Sochaux II	2015–16	CFA	9	0	—		—		—		—		9	0
Sochaux II	2016–17	CFA 2	6	3	—		—		—		—		6	3
Sochaux II	Total		38	6	—		—		—		—		38	6
Sochaux	2014–15	Ligue 2	1	0	0	0	0	0	—		—		1	0
Sochaux	2015–16	Ligue 2	15	0	3	0	1	0	—		—		19	0
Sochaux	2016–17	Ligue 2	21	1	0	0	2	0	—		—		23	1
Sochaux	Total		37	1	3	0	3	0	—		—		43	1
Guingamp	2017–18	Ligue 1	32	3	2	1	0	0	—		—		34	4
Guingamp	2018–19	Ligue 1	32	9	3	2	3	2	—		—		38	13
Guingamp	Total		64	12	5	3	3	2	—		—		72	17
Borussia Mönchengladbach	2019–20	Bundesliga	31	10	2	2	—		6 (Note: Appearances in UEFA Europa League)	2	—		39	14
Borussia Mönchengladbach	2020–21	Bundesliga	29	8	3	1	—		8 (Note: Appearances in UEFA Champions League)	2	—		40	11
Borussia Mönchengladbach	2021–22	Bundesliga	21	3	2	0	—		—		—		23	3
Borussia Mönchengladbach	2022–23	Bundesliga	30	13	2	3	—		—		—		32	16
Borussia Mönchengladbach	Total		111	34	9	6	—		14	4	—		134	44
Inter Milan	2023–24	Serie A	35	13	1	0	—		8	1	2 (Note: Appearance(s) in Supercoppa Italiana)	1	46	15
Inter Milan	2024–25	Serie A	32	14	1	0	—		14	4	3 (Note: One appearance in Supercoppa Italiana, two appearances in FIFA Club World Cup)	0	50	18
Inter Milan	2025–26	Serie A	29	13	5	2	—		9	2	1	1	44	18
Inter Milan	2026–27	Serie A	11	6	0	0	—		4	0	0	0	15	6
Inter Milan	Total		107	46	7	2	—		35	7	6	2	155	57
Career total			357	99	24	11	6	2	49	11	6	2	442	125

=== International ===
As of match played 22 June 2026

Appearances and goals by national team and year
National team	Year	Apps	Goals
France	2020	3	0
France	2021	1	0
France	2022	5	0
France	2023	7	2
France	2024	13	0
France	2025	2	0
France	2026	4	1
Total		35	3

As of match played 22 June 2026
France score listed first, score column indicates score after each Thuram goal

List of international goals scored by Marcus Thuram
No.	Date	Venue	Cap	Opponent	Score	Result	Competition	Ref.
1	7 September 2023	Parc des Princes, Paris, France	11	Republic of Ireland	2–0	2–0	UEFA Euro 2024 qualifying	
2	18 November 2023	Allianz Riviera, Nice, France	15	Gibraltar	2–0	14–0	UEFA Euro 2024 qualifying	
3	29 March 2026	Northwest Stadium, Landover, United States	33	Colombia	2–0	3–1	Friendly	

== Honours ==
Guingamp

- Coupe de la Ligue runner-up: 2018–19

Inter Milan

- Supercoppa Italiana: 2023
- Serie A: 2023–24, 2025–26
- Coppa Italia: 2025–26
- UEFA Champions League runner-up: 2024–25

France U19

- UEFA European Under-19 Championship: 2016

France

- FIFA World Cup runner-up: 2022
- UEFA Nations League fourth place: 2024–25

Individual

- Bundesliga Rookie of the Month: September 2019, October 2019, November 2019
- Serie A Goal of the Month: September 2023
- Serie A Player of the Month: August 2024, April 2026
- Serie A Team of the Year: 2023–24
- Serie A Goal of the Year: 2024
- Serie A Team of the Season: 2024–25
