= Ludovic Ajorque =

French footballer (born 1994)

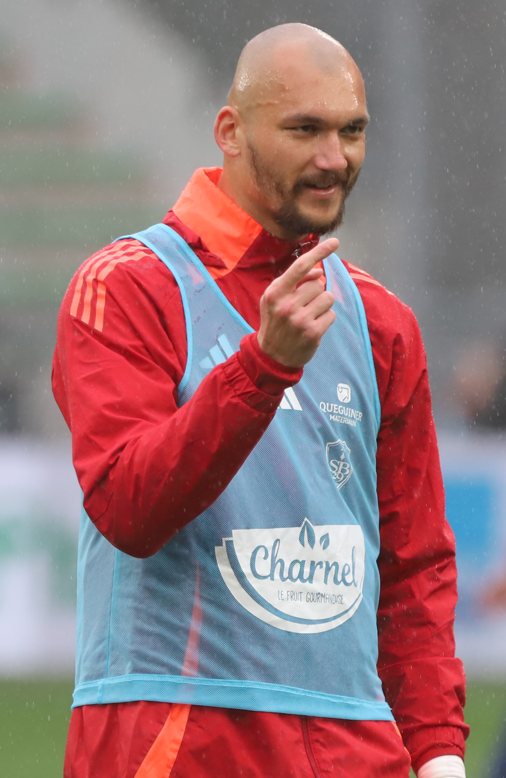
- Ajorque with Brest in 2025

Personal information
- Date of birth: 25 February 1994 (age 32)
- Place of birth: Saint-Denis, Réunion, France
- Height: 1.96 m (6 ft 5 in)
- Position: Striker

Team information
- Current team: Brest
- Number: 19

Youth career
- 2011: AS Excelsior
- 2012–2014: Angers

Senior career*
Years	Team	Apps	(Gls)
2012–2016	Angers	0	(0)
2012–2016	Angers II	37	(14)
2014–2015	→ Poiré-sur-Vie (loan)	15	(2)
2014–2015	→ Poiré-sur-Vie II (loan)	1	(0)
2015–2016	→ Luçon (loan)	32	(9)
2016–2018	Clermont	65	(19)
2017	Clermont II	2	(1)
2018–2023	Strasbourg	135	(46)
2023–2025	Mainz 05	43	(8)
2024–2025	→ Brest (loan)	31	(13)
2025–	Brest	37	(9)
- * Club domestic league appearances and goals as of 22 September 2026

Ludovic Ajorque (born 25 February 1994) is a French professional footballer who plays as a striker for Ligue 1 club Brest.

Developed at Angers, where he made only one Coupe de la Ligue appearance, he played for two years with Clermont in Ligue 2 before a €1.5 million move to Ligue 1 team Strasbourg in 2018. He played 149 times for Strasbourg, scoring 50 goals and winning the Coupe de la Ligue in 2019.

== Club career ==
=== Early career ===
Ajorque began his career at AS Excelsior on his native island before moving to Angers, where he played mainly for the reserve team in the fifth tier. His sole game for Angers was on 12 August 2014 in the first round of the Coupe de la Ligue, playing the first 57 minutes of a 2–1 home win over Nîmes.

In July 2016, following a season on loan at Luçon in the Championnat National, Ajorque transferred to Ligue 2 club Clermont on a three-year deal. After 14 goals in 37 games in 2017–18, he signed a four-year deal at Strasbourg in Ligue 1. The transfer fee was €1.5 million.

=== Strasbourg ===
Ajorque made his top-flight debut on 12 August 2018, starting as the season began with a 2–0 win at Bordeaux, and scored the first of his nine goals on 1 September to open a 3–2 home loss to Nantes. The following 19 January, he scored twice in a 5–1 win at Monaco, and added another brace on 9 March as the team came from behind to draw with Lyon at the Stade de la Meinau.

In the 2018–19 Coupe de la Ligue, Ajorque played four games and scored twice as the Alsatians won the trophy for the first time in 14 years. His penalty opened a 2–1 win at Lyon in the quarter-finals on 8 January, and he equalised in a 3–2 home win over Bordeaux three weeks later. With this result, the team entered the UEFA Europa League, where he scored in each leg of a 4–3 aggregate win over Maccabi Haifa.

In June 2020, Ajorque extended his contract until 2024. In the ensuing season, in which his team finished two points above the relegation play-offs, he scored 16 goals in 35 games; this put him joint fourth behind Kylian Mbappé, Wissam Ben Yedder and Memphis Depay. In 2021–22, his 12 goals put him in 10th. On 7 November, he was sent off for the first time in his career for a foul on Fábio in a 2–2 draw at Nantes.

In the first half of the 2022–23 Ligue 1 season, Ajorque netted just once in 13 games.

=== Mainz 05 ===
On 24 January 2023, Ajorque signed for Bundesliga club Mainz 05 for an undisclosed fee, signing a three-and-a-half-year contract. He made his debut the following day, playing the last ten minutes of a 2–1 home loss to Borussia Dortmund as a substitute for Karim Onisiwo, and scored his first goal on 24 February in a 4–0 win against Borussia Mönchengladbach at the Mewa Arena. He totalled six goals in 17 games as his team finished 9th; this included an equaliser in a 3–1 comeback win against eventual champions FC Bayern Munich on 22 April.

=== Brest ===
On 25 July 2024, Ajorque moved to Brest in Ligue 1 on loan with an option to buy. The deal was eventually made permanent for around €3 million.

On 20 September 2025, Ajorque scored a goal and provided 3 assists in a 4–1 win over Ligue 1 side Nice.

== International career ==
Born in Réunion, Ajorque is of Malagasy descent and was approached to join the Madagascar national team in March 2018. He has said he wants to concentrate on club football.

== Career statistics ==
As of match played 17 May 2025

Appearances by club, season and competition
Club	Season	League			National cup (Note: Includes Coupe de France, DFB-Pokal)		League cup (Note: Includes Coupe de la Ligue)		Europe		Total	
Club	Season	Division	Apps	Goals	Apps	Goals	Apps	Goals	Apps	Goals	Apps	Goals
Angers II	2012–13	CFA 2	7	1	—		—		—		7	1
Angers II	2013–14	CFA 2	22	10	—		—		—		22	10
Angers II	2014–15	CFA 2	8	3	—		—		—		8	3
Angers II	Total		37	14	—		—		—		37	14
Angers	2014–15	Ligue 2	0	0	0	0	1	0	—		1	0
Poiré-sur-Vie (loan)	2014–15	National	15	2	1	0	—		—		16	2
Poiré-sur-Vie II (loan)	2014–15	CFA 2	1	0	—		—		—		1	0
Luçon (loan)	2015–16	National	32	9	0	0	—		—		32	9
Clermont	2016–17	Ligue 2	28	5	0	0	2	1	—		30	6
Clermont	2017–18	Ligue 2	37	14	1	0	2	0	—		40	14
Clermont	Total		65	19	1	0	4	1	—		70	20
Clermont II	2016–17	CFA 2	2	1	—		—		—		2	1
Strasbourg	2018–19	Ligue 1	25	9	0	0	4	2	—		29	11
Strasbourg	2019–20	Ligue 1	26	8	0	0	1	0	6 (Note: Appearances in UEFA Europa League)	2	33	10
Strasbourg	2020–21	Ligue 1	35	16	1	0	—		—		36	16
Strasbourg	2021–22	Ligue 1	36	12	2	0	—		—		38	12
Strasbourg	2022–23	Ligue 1	13	1	0	0	—		—		13	1
Strasbourg	Total		135	46	3	0	5	2	6	2	149	50
Mainz 05	2022–23	Bundesliga	17	6	1	0	—		—		18	6
Mainz 05	2023–24	Bundesliga	26	2	2	1	—		—		28	3
Mainz 05	Total		43	8	3	1	—		—		46	9
Brest (loan)	2024–25	Ligue 1	31	13	4	1	—		8 (Note: Appearances in UEFA Champions League)	0	43	14
Career total			361	112	12	2	10	3	14	2	397	119

== Honours ==
Strasbourg

- Coupe de la Ligue: 2018–19

Individual

- UNFP Ligue 1 Player of the Month: February 2026
