= Guessouma Fofana =

Footballer (born 1992)

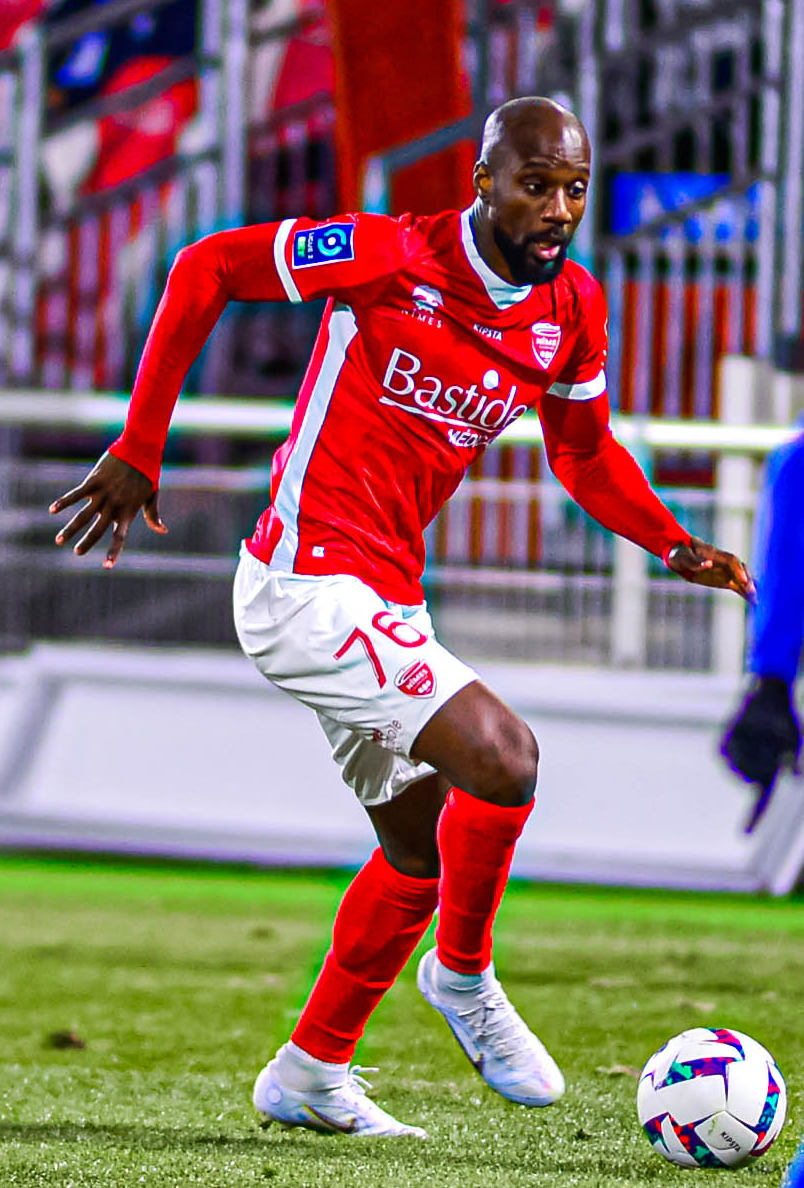
- Fofana in 2023

Personal information
- Date of birth: 17 December 1992 (age 33)
- Place of birth: Le Havre, France
- Height: 1.86 m (6 ft 1 in)
- Position: Midfielder

Youth career
- –2010: ES Mont-Gaillard
- 2010–2011: Le Havre

Senior career*
Years	Team	Apps	(Gls)
2010–2012	Le Havre B	20	(0)
2012–2013	Boulogne B	5	(0)
2013–2015	Lyon-Duchère	43	(1)
2015–2018	Amiens	77	(4)
2018–2021	Guingamp	34	(3)
2019–2020	→ Le Mans (loan)	16	(1)
2021–2023	CFR Cluj	4	(0)
2023	Nîmes	12	(1)
2023–2024	Doxa Katokopias	24	(0)
2024–2026	Al-Hilal SC	31	(0)

International career^{‡}
2021–	Mauritania	27	(0)
- * Club domestic league appearances and goals as of 9 July 2026 ‡ National team caps and goals as of 27 January 2024

Guessouma "Gus" Fofana (born 17 December 1992) is a professional footballer who plays as a midfielder for Super D1 club Omdurman. He represents Mauritania at the international level.

== Club career ==
In August 2018, Fofana joined En Avant de Guingamp on a three-year contract. The transfer fee paid to Amiens was estimated at €1 million. At the end of the summer 2019 transfer window, he moved on loan to Le Mans, which had been newly promoted to Ligue 2.

On 17 September 2023, Fofana signed for Cypriot First Division club Daxo Katokopias.

== International career ==
Fofana was called up to the Mauritania national team in November 2021 for 2022 FIFA World Cup qualification matches against Zambia and Equatorial Guinea. He made his debut for Mauritania in a 1–1 draw against Equatorial Guinea on 16 November 2021.

== Personal life ==
Fofana was born in Le Havre, France. He holds French, Malian, and Mauritanian nationalities. He is the brother of footballers Gueïda and Mamadou Fofana.

== Career statistics ==
Mauritania national team
Year	Apps	Goals
2021	4	0
2022	6	0
2023	2	0
Total	12	0

== Honours ==
Guingamp

- Coupe de la Ligue runner-up: 2018–19

CFR Cluj

- Liga I: 2021–22
