= Ousmane Sidibé =

French-born Guinean footballer (born 1985)

Personal information
- Full name: Ousmane Sidibé
- Date of birth: 23 April 1985 (age 41)
- Place of birth: Paris, France
- Height: 1.78 m (5 ft 10 in)
- Position: Defender

Senior career*
Years	Team	Apps	(Gls)
2003–2008	Les Lilas	?	(?)
2008–2009	Noisy-le-Sec	25	(0)
2009–2010	Villemomble	33	(0)
2010–2011	Aubervilliers	30	(0)
2011–2012	Paris FC	26	(0)
2012–2013	Cannes	21	(0)
2013–2015	Orléans	55	(1)
2016–2018	Paris FC	56	(0)
2018–2019	Béziers	29	(0)
2019	Olympiakos Nicosia	7	(0)
2020–2021	Red Star	2	(0)

International career^{‡}
2015	Guinea	8	(0)
- * Club domestic league appearances and goals as of 11:10, 7 July 2021 (UTC) ‡ National team caps and goals as of 18:37, 21 February 2020 (UTC)

Ousmane Sidibé (born 23 April 1985) is a Guinean professional footballer who last played as a defender for Red Star F.C.

== Club career ==
Sidibé spent his early career in and around Paris, with Espérance Paris 19ème, Les Lilas, Noisy-le-Sec, Villemomble and Aubervilliers.

Sidibé played in Ligue 2 for Orléans, Béziers and Paris FC, having gained promotion from Championnat National with both Orléans and Paris FC. He signed his first professional contract in 2016 with Orléans after their successful rise to Ligue 2. He spent half a season in Cyprus with Olympiakos Nicosia in 2019.

In January 2020, Sidibé returned to France with Red Star.

== International career ==
Born in France to Guinean parents, Sidibé won his first international cap for Guinea against Zimbabwe in September 2015.

== Career statistics ==
=== International ===
As of matches played on 14 July 2019

Guinea national team
Year	Apps	Goals
2015	1	0
2016	0	0
2017	1	0
2018	4	0
2019	2	0
Total	8	0
