= Benoît Millot =

French football referee

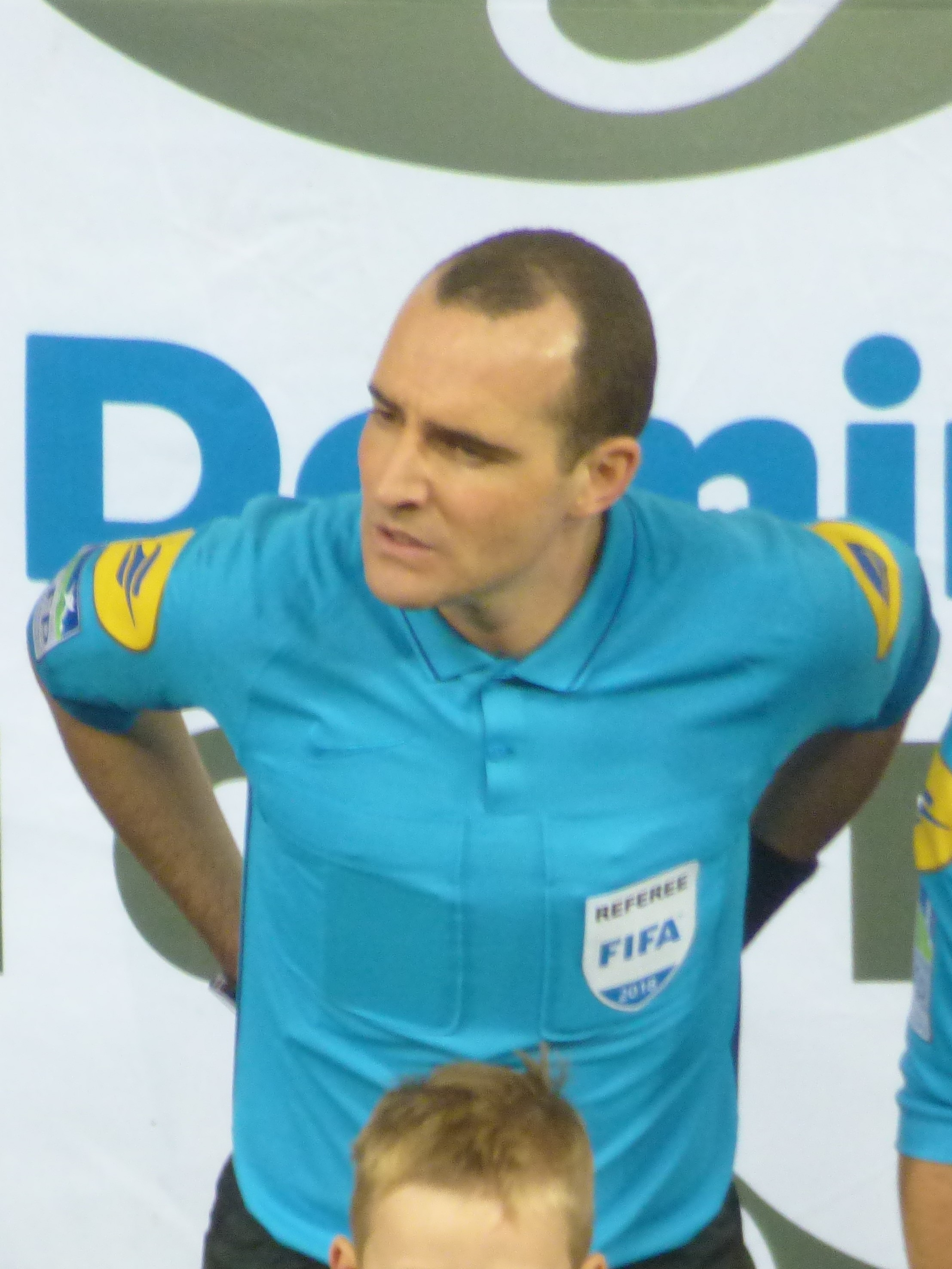
- Millot in 2018
- Born: 10 January 1982 (age 44); Châtenay-Malabry, France

Domestic
Years	League	Role
2010–	Ligue 2	Referee
2011–	Ligue 1	Referee

International
Years	League	Role
2014–	FIFA listed	Referee

Benoît Millot (born 10 January 1982) is a French football referee who officiates in Ligue 1. He has been a FIFA referee since 2014, and is ranked as a UEFA second category referee.

== Refereeing career ==
Millot began officiating in Ligue 2 in 2010, before being promoted to Ligue 1 the following year. He officiated his first Ligue 1 match on 13 August 2011 between Sochaux and Caen. In 2014, he was put on the FIFA referees list. He officiated his first senior international match on 25 May 2014 between Mali and Guinea. His first UEFA club competition match as referee was on 24 July 2014, a meeting between Slovenian club Koper and Azerbaijani club Neftçi in the 2014–15 UEFA Europa League second qualifying round.

In September 2018, Millot officiated a match in the 2018–19 Swiss Super League between St. Gallen and Grasshopper. Millot was also selected to officiate the 2019 Coupe de la Ligue Final between Strasbourg and Guingamp.

Millot was selected as an additional assistant referee for matches at the 2017 UEFA European Under-21 Championship in Poland, including the final between Germany and Spain. In 2019, Millot was selected as a video assistant referee at the 2019 FIFA U-20 World Cup in Poland. Later that year, he served as a video assistant referee at the 2019 Africa Cup of Nations in Egypt, including in the final between Senegal and Algeria, and the 2019 FIFA Club World Cup in Qatar. On 23 April 2021, he was selected by FIFA as a video assistant referee for the football tournaments at the 2020 Summer Olympics in Japan.
