= 2018–19 Coupe de la Ligue =

French League Cup

Tournament details
- Country: France
- Dates: 14 August 2018 – 30 March 2019
- Teams: 44

Final positions
- Champions: Strasbourg (4th title)
- Runners-up: Guingamp

Tournament statistics
- Matches played: 43
- Goals scored: 75 (1.74 per match)
- Top goal scorer(s): Sixteen players (2 goals each)

The 2018–19 Coupe de la Ligue was the 25th year for the league cup competition held in France. Forty-four clubs participated in the competition.

Strasbourg won their fourth Coupe de la Ligue title (their first in fourteen years) following a 4–1 win on penalties over Guingamp in the final.

Paris Saint-Germain were the five-time defending champions after winning the cup in the previous five seasons, but were eliminated in the quarter-finals after a 2–1 loss to Guingamp.

== First round ==
Twelve first round matches were played on 14 August 2018.

| 14 August 2018 | Tours (3) | 0–1 | Lens (2) | Tours |
| 18:30 CEST | | Report | Sagnan 90+3' | Stadium: Stade de la Vallée du Cher; Attendance: 3,551; Referee: Romain Lissorgue |

| 14 August 2018 | Le Havre (2) | 2–0 | Bourg-Péronnas (3) | Le Havre |
| 20:00 CEST | Thiaré 15', 63' (pen.) | Report | | Stadium: Stade Océane; Attendance: 3,712; Referee: Alexandre Perreau Niel |

| 14 August 2018 | Nancy (2) | 1–0 | Red Star (2) | Nancy |
| 20:00 CEST | Bassouamina 1' | Report | | Stadium: Stade Marcel Picot; Attendance: 7,891; Referee: William Lavis |

| 14 August 2018 | Metz (2) | 2–1 | Grenoble (2) | Metz |
| 20:00 CEST | Niane 71' (pen.), 90+5' (pen.) | Report | Chergui 17' | Stadium: Stade Saint-Symphorien; Attendance: 9,494; Referee: Mehdi Mokhtari |

| 14 August 2018 | Quevilly-Rouen (3) | 1–2 | Troyes (2) | Petit-Quevilly |
| 20:00 CEST | Rogie 30' | Report | Tchimbenbe 42'; Raveloson 45+1' | Stadium: Stade Amable-et-Micheline-Lozai; Attendance: 1,264; Referee: Aurélien Petit |

| 14 August 2018 | Paris FC (2) | 0–0 (3–4 p) | Ajaccio (2) | Paris |
| 20:00 CEST | | Report | | Stadium: Stade Charléty; Attendance: 1,820; Referee: Faouzi Benchabane |
| | Penalties |
| | Gbelle (penalty scored); Azevedo (penalty scored); Kouamé (penalty scored); López (penalty missed); Bong (penalty missed) | | (penalty scored) Mendes; (penalty scored) Nouri; (penalty scored) Laçi; (penalty scored) Cabit |

| 14 August 2018 | Châteauroux (2) | 1–0 | Niort (2) | Châteauroux |
| 20:00 CEST | Livolant 25' | Report | | Stadium: Stade Gaston Petit; Attendance: 2,317; Referee: Benjamin Lepaysant |

| 14 August 2018 | Orléans (2) | 1–1 (6–5 p) | Béziers (2) | Orléans |
| 20:00 CEST | Ziani 80' (pen.) | Report | Sidibé 19' | Stadium: Stade de la Source; Attendance: 2,186; Referee: Yohann Rouinsard |
| | Penalties |
| | Bouby (penalty scored); Le Tallec (penalty scored); Tell (penalty scored); El Khoumisti (penalty scored); Ziani (penalty missed); Demoncy (penalty scored); Furtado (penalty scored) | | (penalty scored) Elissalt; (penalty scored) Nouri; (penalty scored) Etou; (penalty missed) Sidibé; (penalty scored) Sissoko; (penalty scored) Cidinho; (penalty missed) Lingani |

| 14 August 2018 | Auxerre (2) | 3–1 | Gazélec Ajaccio (2) | Auxerre |
| 20:00 CEST | Mancini 40', 49'; Bizet 90+3' | Report | Gomis 45+1' (pen.) | Stadium: Stade Abbé-Deschamps; Attendance: 4,454; Referee: Sylvain Palhies |

| 14 August 2018 | Laval (3) | 0–3 | Clermont (2) | Laval |
| 20:00 CEST | | Report | Pereira Lage 26', 51'; Bayo 62' | Stadium: Stade Francis Le Basser; Attendance: 2,811; Referee: Bartolomeu Varela |

| 14 August 2018 | Sochaux (2) | 1–1 (3–4 p) | Brest (2) | Montbéliard |
| 20:00 CEST | Chardonnet 73' (o.g.) | Report | Autret 25' | Stadium: Stade Auguste Bonal; Attendance: 5,887; Referee: Romain Delpech |
| | Penalties |
| | Robinet (penalty missed); Gomes (penalty scored); Demirović (penalty scored); Nando (penalty missed); Sané (penalty scored); Pendant (penalty missed) | | (penalty scored) Autret; (penalty scored) Chardonnet; (penalty scored) Butin; (penalty missed) Pi; (penalty missed) Charbonnier; (penalty scored) Diallo |

| 14 August 2018 | Valenciennes (2) | 0–1 | Lorient (2) | Valenciennes |
| 20:45 CEST | | Report | Edjouma 26' | Stadium: Stade du Hainaut; Attendance: 4,735; Referee: Bastien Dechepy |

== Second round ==
Six second round matches were played on 28 August 2018.

| 28 August 2018 | Ajaccio (2) | 0–1 | Lorient (2) | Ajaccio |
| 18:30 CEST | | Report | Courtet 21' | Stadium: Stade François Coty; Attendance: 1,467; Referee: Benoît Millot |

| 28 August 2018 | Le Havre (2) | 3–3 (6–5 p) | Brest (2) | Le Havre |
| 20:00 CEST | Gory 20', 35'; Moussiti-Oko 49' | Report | Chardonnet 66'; Autret 67'; Castelletto 70' | Stadium: Stade Océane; Attendance: 3,663; Referee: Sylvain Palhies |
| | Penalties |
| | Mayembo (penalty missed); Basque (penalty scored); Ferhat (penalty scored); Özdemir (penalty scored); Moussiti-Oko (penalty scored); Lekhal (penalty scored); Assifuah (penalty scored) | | (penalty scored) Autret; (penalty scored) Chardonnet; (penalty scored) Butin; (penalty missed) Belkebla; (penalty scored) Charbonnier; (penalty scored) Pi; (penalty missed) Bernard |

| 28 August 2018 | Nancy (2) | 1–1 (3–5 p) | Orléans (2) | Nancy |
| 20:00 CEST | Bassouamina 75' | Report | Demoncy 60' | Stadium: Stade Marcel Picot; Attendance: 7,296; Referee: Faouzi Benchabane |
| | Penalties |
| | Dalé (penalty scored); Muratori (penalty scored); Marchetti (penalty scored); Diagne (penalty missed) | | (penalty scored) Bouby; (penalty scored) Demoncy; (penalty scored) Tell; (penalty scored) Monfray; (penalty scored) El Khoumisti |

| 28 August 2018 | Auxerre (2) | 2–1 | Châteauroux (2) | Auxerre |
| 20:00 CEST | Souprayen 38'; Marcelin 53' | Report | Diarra 23' | Stadium: Stade de l'Abbé-Deschamps; Attendance: 4,281; Referee: William Lavis |

| 28 August 2018 | Troyes (2) | 3–1 | Clermont (2) | Troyes |
| 20:00 CEST | Ben Saada 10'; Tinhan 49'; Mbeumo 66' | Report | Ogier 65' | Stadium: Stade de l'Aube; Attendance: 2,805; Referee: Yohann Rouinsard |

| 28 August 2018 | Lens (2) | 1–1 (3–5 p) | Metz (2) | Lens |
| 20:45 CEST | Ba 86' | Report | Jallow 45' | Stadium: Stade Bollaert-Delelis; Attendance: 14,963; Referee: Olivier Thual |
| | Penalties |
| | Ba (penalty scored); Fortuné (penalty scored); Chouiar (penalty missed); Gomis (penalty scored) | | (penalty scored) Niane; (penalty scored) Gakpa; (penalty scored) Balliu; (penalty scored) Rivierez; (penalty scored) Diallo |

== Third round ==
The draw for the third round matches was held on 12 September 2018.

| 30 October 2018 | Montpellier (1) | 0–3 | Nantes (1) | Montpellier |
| 18:45 CET | | Report | Coulibaly 58'; Waris 80'; Sala 90+4' | Stadium: Stade de la Mosson; Attendance: 6,774; Referee: Olivier Thual |

| 30 October 2018 | Strasbourg (1) | 2–0 | Lille (1) | Strasbourg |
| 21:05 CET | Fofana 13'; Liénard 81' | Report | | Stadium: Stade de la Meinau; Attendance: 16,821; Referee: Hakim Ben El Hadj |

| 31 October 2018 | Nice (1) | 3–2 | Auxerre (2) | Nice |
| 18:45 CET | Maolida 16'; Walter 41', 80' (pen.) | Report | Dugimont 29'; Philippoteaux 82' | Stadium: Allianz Riviera; Attendance: 15,701; Referee: Bartolomeu Varela |

| 31 October 2018 | Metz (2) | 1–2 | Amiens (1) | Metz |
| 21:05 CET | Rivière 70' | Report | Niane 5' (o.g.); Otero 72' | Stadium: Stade Saint-Symphorien; Attendance: 5,220; Referee: Nicolas Rainville |

| 31 October 2018 | Le Havre (2) | 2–0 | Troyes (2) | Le Havre |
| 21:05 CET | Lekhal 25'; Bonnet 30' | Report | | Stadium: Stade Océane; Attendance: 4,009; Referee: Yohann Rouinsard |

| 31 October 2018 | Toulouse (1) | 0–1 | Lorient (2) | Toulouse |
| 21:05 CET | | Report | Bila 74' | Stadium: Stadium Municipal; Attendance: 8,445; Referee: Florent Batta |

| 31 October 2018 | Guingamp (1) | 0–0 (3–2 p) | Angers (1) | Guingamp |
| 21:05 CET | | Report | | Stadium: Stade du Roudourou; Attendance: 11,630; Referee: Karim Abed |
| | Penalties |
| | Eboa Eboa (penalty missed); Coco (penalty scored); Ngbakoto (penalty missed); Fofana (penalty scored); Blas (penalty scored) | | (penalty missed) Kanga; (penalty missed) Capelle; (penalty missed) Bertrand; (penalty scored) Santamaria; (penalty scored) Fulgini |

| 31 October 2018 | Dijon (1) | 3–1 | Caen (1) | Dijon |
| 21:05 CET | Saïd 3', 79'; Sliti 7' | Report | Khaoui 50' | Stadium: Stade Gaston Gérard; Attendance: 10,193; Referee: Johan Hamel |

| 31 October 2018 | Reims (1) | 1–1 (2–3 p) | Orléans (2) | Reims |
| 21:05 CET | Ojo 88' | Report | Tell 61' | Stadium: Stade Auguste-Delaune; Attendance: 5,237; Referee: William Lavis |
| | Penalties |
| | Chavarría (penalty missed); Kamara (penalty missed); Oudin (penalty scored); Ojo (penalty scored); Fontaine (penalty missed) | | (penalty scored) Lecoeuche; (penalty scored) Demoncy; (penalty scored) Tell; (penalty missed) Le Tallec; (penalty missed) Cambon |

| 27 November 2018 | Nîmes (1) | 1–1 (4–2 p) | Saint-Étienne (1) | Nîmes |
| 19:00 CET | Bouanga 90' | Report | Berić 81' | Stadium: Stade des Costières; Attendance: 6,260; Referee: Mikaël Lesage |
| | Penalties |
| | Savanier (penalty scored); Bobichon (penalty missed); Bouanga (penalty scored); Alioui (penalty scored); Bozok (penalty scored) | | (penalty missed) Khazri; (penalty missed) M'Vila; (penalty scored) Salibur; (penalty scored) Polomat |

== Round of 16 ==
The draw for the Round of 16 matches was held on 14 November 2018.

| 18 December 2018 | Orléans (2) | 1–2 | Paris Saint-Germain (1) | Orléans |
| 21:00 CET | Lopy 69' | Report | Cavani 41'; Diaby 81' | Stadium: Stade de la Source; Attendance: 7,812; Referee: Jérôme Miguelgorry |

| 19 December 2018 | Amiens (1) | 2–3 | Lyon (1) | Amiens |
| 18:45 CET | Denayer 70' (o.g.); Timité 90+1' | Report | Dembélé 20' (pen.); Traoré 45+2'; Terrier 60' | Stadium: Stade de la Licorne; Attendance: 7,327; Referee: Karim Abed |

| 19 December 2018 | Marseille (1) | 1–1 (2–4 p) | Strasbourg (1) | Marseille |
| 21:05 CET | Luiz Gustavo 80' | Report | Martin 18' (pen.) | Stadium: Stade Vélodrome; Attendance: 8,200; Referee: Ruddy Buquet |
| | Penalties |
| | Lopez (penalty scored); Payet (penalty missed); Luiz Gustavo (penalty scored); Rami (penalty missed) | | (penalty scored) Liénard; (penalty scored) Thomasson; (penalty scored) Mothiba; (penalty scored) Martin |

| 19 December 2018 | Nice (1) | 0–0 (1–3 p) | Guingamp (1) | Nice |
| 21:05 CET | | Report | | Stadium: Allianz Riviera; Attendance: 12,714; Referee: Mikael Lesage |
| | Penalties |
| | Lees-Melou (penalty missed); Dante (penalty missed); Walter (penalty scored); Jallet (penalty missed) | | (penalty scored) Mendy; (penalty scored) Eboa Eboa; (penalty scored) Ngbakoto |

| 19 December 2018 | Monaco (1) | 1–0 | Lorient (2) | Monaco |
| 21:05 CET | Biancone 70' | Report | | Stadium: Stade Louis II; Attendance: 6,068; Referee: Benoît Millot |

| 19 December 2018 | Rennes (1) | 2–1 | Nantes (1) | Rennes |
| 21:05 CET | Mexer 60'; Da Silva 89' | Report | Waris 49' | Stadium: Roazhon Park; Attendance: 19,435; Referee: Benoît Bastien |

| 19 December 2018 | Dijon (1) | 0–1 | Bordeaux (1) | Dijon |
| 21:05 CET | | Report | Bašić 66' | Stadium: Stade Gaston Gérard; Attendance: 4,661; Referee: Florent Batta |

| 19 December 2018 | Le Havre (2) | 2–1 | Nîmes (1) | Le Havre |
| 21:05 CET | Kadewere 33'; Bonnet 58' | Report | Bobichon 38' | Stadium: Stade Océane; Attendance: 6,150; Referee: François Letexier |

== Quarter-finals ==
The draw for the quarter-final matches was held on 19 December 2018.

| 8 January 2019 | Lyon (1) | 1–2 | Strasbourg (1) | Lyon |
| 21:00 CET | Traoré 49' | Report | Ajorque 26' (pen.); Koné 52' | Stadium: Parc Olympique Lyonnais; Attendance: 21,721; Referee: Clément Turpin |

| 9 January 2019 | Monaco (1) | 1–1 (8–7 p) | Rennes (1) | Monaco |
| 18:45 CET | Lopes 54' | Report | Bourigeaud 30' | Stadium: Stade Louis II; Attendance: 6,022; Referee: Amaury Delerue |
| | Penalties |
| | Pelé (penalty scored); Tielemans (penalty missed); Aït Bennasser (penalty scored); Isidor (penalty scored); Glik (penalty missed); Naldo (penalty missed); Diop (penalty scored); Lopes (penalty scored); Serrano (penalty scored); Henrichs (penalty scored); L. Badiashile (penalty scored) | | (penalty scored) Niang; (penalty scored) Grenier; (penalty missed) Ben Arfa; (penalty scored) André; (penalty missed) Zeffane; (penalty missed) Da Silva; (penalty scored) Sarr; (penalty scored) Bourigeaud; (penalty scored) Mexer; (penalty scored) Traoré; (penalty missed) Koubek |

| 9 January 2019 | Paris Saint-Germain (1) | 1–2 | Guingamp (1) | Paris |
| 21:05 CET | Neymar 63' | Report | Ngbakoto 83' (pen.); Thuram 90+2' (pen.) | Stadium: Parc des Princes; Attendance: 47,576; Referee: Benoît Bastien |

| 9 January 2019 | Bordeaux (1) | 1–0 | Le Havre (2) | Bordeaux |
| 21:05 CET | Kalu 70' | Report | | Stadium: Matmut Atlantique; Attendance: 7,600; Referee: Ruddy Buquet |

== Semi-finals ==
The draw for the semi-final matches was held on 10 January 2019.

| 29 January 2019 | Guingamp (1) | 2–2 (5–4 p) | Monaco (1) | Guingamp |
| 21:05 CET | Mendy 46'; Thuram 55' | Report | Lopes 18'; Golovin 24' | Stadium: Stade du Roudourou; Attendance: 11,216; Referee: Jérôme Brisard |
| | Penalties |
| | Rodelin (penalty scored); Roux (penalty scored); Eboa Eboa (penalty missed); Rebocho (penalty scored); Thuram (penalty missed); Phiri (penalty scored); Coco (penalty scored) | | (penalty scored) Fàbregas; (penalty scored) Ballo-Touré; (penalty scored) Jemerson; (penalty missed) Henrichs; (penalty missed) Glik; (penalty scored) Sidibé; (penalty missed) Diop |

| 30 January 2019 | Strasbourg (1) | 3–2 | Bordeaux (1) | Strasbourg |
| 18:45 CET | Ajorque 49'; Mothiba 55', 60' | Report | Sankharé 14'; Briand 82' | Stadium: Stade de la Meinau; Attendance: 25,090; Referee: Antony Gautier |

== Final ==
30 March 2019
21:05 CET

| Strasbourg | 0–0 (a.e.t.) | Guingamp |
|---|---|---|
| | Report |
Penalties
| Prcić (penalty scored); Thomasson (penalty scored); Liénard (penalty scored); Carole (penalty scored) | 4–1 | (penalty missed) Mendy; (penalty scored) Didot; (penalty missed) Rodelin |

Stade Pierre-Mauroy, Villeneuve-d'Ascq
Attendance: 49,161
Referee: Benoît Millot

== See also ==
- 2018–19 Ligue 1
- 2018–19 Ligue 2
