= Félix Eboa Eboa =

Cameroonian footballer (born 1997)

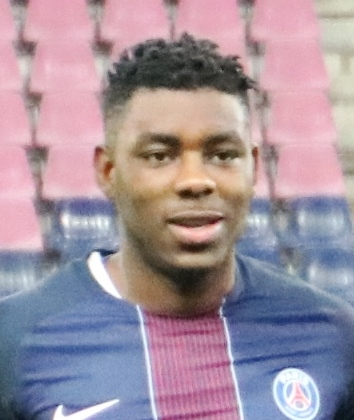
- Eboa Eboa with Paris Saint-Germain in 2017

Personal information
- Full name: Félix Junior Eboa Eboa
- Date of birth: 19 April 1997 (age 29)
- Place of birth: Douala, Cameroon
- Height: 1.86 m (6 ft 1 in)
- Position: Center-back

Team information
- Current team: Thep Xanh Nam Dinh
- Number: 93

Youth career
- 2010–2017: Paris Saint-Germain

Senior career*
Years	Team	Apps	(Gls)
2015–2017	Paris Saint-Germain B	43	(1)
2017–2023	Guingamp B	8	(1)
2017–2023	Guingamp	74	(4)
2024–2026	Arda Kardzhali	66	(5)
2026–	Thep Xanh Nam Dinh	0	(0)

International career
2015	Cameroon	1	(0)
- * Club domestic league appearances and goals as of 11 June 2026

Félix Junior Eboa Eboa (born 19 April 1997) is a Cameroonian professional footballer who plays as a center-back for V.League 1 club Thep Xanh Nam Dinh.

== Club career ==
On 22 June 2017, Eboa Eboa signed his first professional contract with Guingamp.

In August 2020, he suffered a "nightmare" injury that ruled him out for the entirety of the 2020–21 season. In February 2024, Eboa Eboa signed a two-and-a-half-year contract with Bulgarian club Arda Kardzhali.

On 22 July 2026, Eboa Eboa moved to Vietnam, joining V.League 1 club Thep Xanh Nam Dinh.

== International career ==
As of October 2015, Eboa Eboa has made his debut for Cameroon national team.

== Personal life ==
Eboa Eboa holds both Cameroonian and French nationalities.

== Honours ==
Guingamp

- Coupe de la Ligue runner-up: 2018–19
