= Pedro Rebocho =

Portuguese footballer (born 1995)

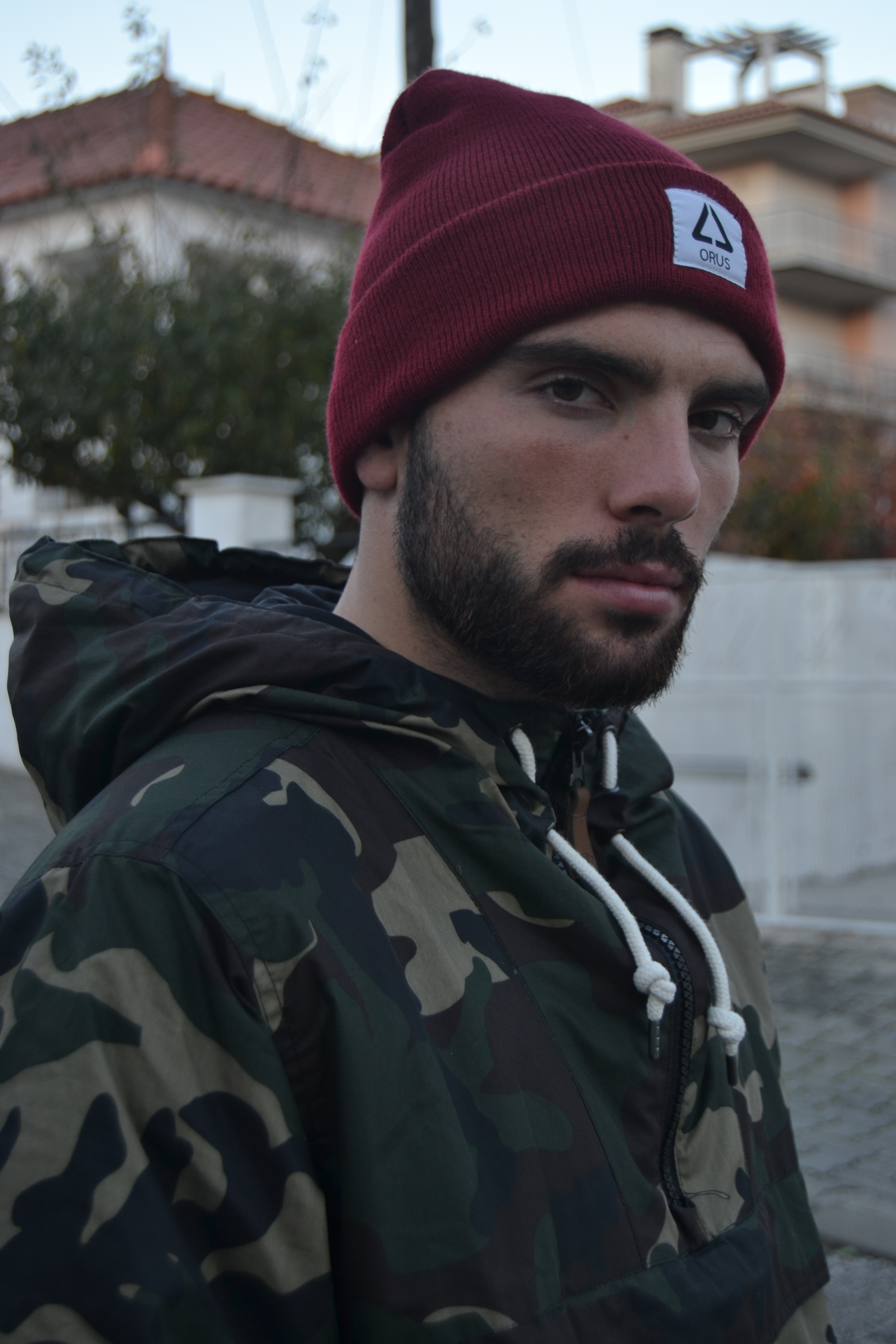
- Rebocho in 2016

Personal information
- Full name: Pedro Miguel Braga Rebocho
- Date of birth: 23 January 1995 (age 31)
- Place of birth: Évora, Portugal
- Height: 1.71 m (5 ft 7 in)
- Position: Left-back

Team information
- Current team: Al-Khaleej
- Number: 5

Youth career
- 2004–2007: Juventude Évora
- 2007–2014: Benfica

Senior career*
Years	Team	Apps	(Gls)
2014–2016	Benfica B	60	(3)
2016–2017	Moreirense	29	(0)
2017–2021	Guingamp	77	(0)
2019–2020	→ Beşiktaş (loan)	9	(0)
2021	→ Paços Ferreira (loan)	20	(0)
2021–2023	Lech Poznań	40	(1)
2023–	Al-Khaleej	107	(0)

International career
2010–2011	Portugal U16	11	(0)
2011–2012	Portugal U17	11	(0)
2012–2013	Portugal U18	6	(0)
2012–2014	Portugal U19	31	(0)
2015	Portugal U20	5	(0)
2016–2017	Portugal U21	5	(0)
Medal record
Men's football
Representing Portugal
UEFA European Under-19 Championship
Runner-up	2014 Hungary
- * Club domestic league appearances and goals as of 20:54, 18 September 2026 (UTC)

Pedro Miguel Braga Rebocho (born 23 January 1995) is a Portuguese professional footballer who plays as a left-back for Saudi Pro League club Al-Khaleej.

== Club career ==
=== Benfica ===
Born in Évora, Rebocho started his football career at local club Juventude de Évora in 2004. Three years later, he joined Benfica's youth system, playing for their under-19 team in the 2013–14 UEFA Youth League, where they were runners-up to Barcelona. Previously, on 16 November 2012, he had signed a professional contract until June 2015.

On 9 August 2014, Rebocho was called up for a Benfica B match against Trofense in the Segunda Liga, but he did not feature in the former's 3–2 home win. Two weeks later, he made his professional debut in a 4–0 home victory over Académico de Viseu.

Rebocho finished the 2015–16 season with three goals in 28 matches, helping his team to narrowly avoid relegation.

=== Moreirense ===
On 4 July 2016, Rebocho joined Moreirense on a three-year deal. His first game in the Primeira Liga took place on 25 September, when he played the entire 1–0 home loss to Vitória de Guimarães.

Rebocho contributed four appearances in the side's victorious run in the Taça da Liga, including the final 1–0 defeat of Braga on 29 January 2017.

=== Guingamp ===
On 20 June 2017, Rebocho agreed to a three-year contract at French club Guingamp. He made his Ligue 1 debut on 5 August, starting in the 3–1 away win against Metz.

On 8 August 2019, Rebocho was loaned to Beşiktaş of the Turkish Süper Lig on a season-long loan with the option to make the move permanent. On 12 January 2021, in a similar loan, he joined Paços de Ferreira.

=== Lech Poznań ===
On 23 August 2021, Rebocho signed a two-year contract with Lech Poznań. He made his debut in the Polish Ekstraklasa on 17 September, scoring and assisting once in a 5–0 home rout of Wisła Kraków. He added 20 more for the champions until the end of the campaign.

Rebocho featured less in the league in 2022–23, but started in 16 out of 18 UEFA Europa Conference League games as Lech reached the quarter-finals. On 18 May 2023, it was announced he would leave as a free agent on 30 June.

=== Khaleej ===
On 20 June 2023, Rebocho joined Saudi Professional League club Al-Khaleej on a one-year deal. In July 2024, he extended his contract for another season.

== International career ==
Rebocho was part of the Portuguese squad for the 2014 UEFA European Under-19 Championship. He played all matches in the tournament held in Hungary, losing the final 1–0 to Germany.

On 11 October 2016, Rebocho won his first cap for the under-21s, in a 7–1 away demolition of Liechtenstein in the 2017 UEFA European Championship qualifiers. Selected for the finals in Poland by manager Rui Jorge, he appeared in the 4–2 group win against North Macedonia as the tournament ended at that stage.

== Career statistics ==
As of match played on 27 May 2024

Appearances and goals by club, season and competition
Club	Season	League			National cup (Note: Includes Taça de Portugal, Coupe de France, Turkish Cup, Polish Cup, King's Cup)		League cup (Note: Includes Taça da Liga, Coupe de la Ligue)		Other		Total	
Club	Season	Division	Apps	Goals	Apps	Goals	Apps	Goals	Apps	Goals	Apps	Goals
Benfica B	2014–15	Segunda Liga	32	0	—		—		—		32	0
Benfica B	2015–16	Segunda Liga	28	3	—		—		—		28	3
Benfica B	Total		60	3	—		—		—		60	3
Moreirense	2016–17	Primeira Liga	29	0	1	0	4	0	—		34	0
Guingamp	2017–18	Ligue 1	21	0	2	0	1	0	—		24	0
Guingamp	2018–19	Ligue 1	36	0	3	0	4	0	—		43	0
Guingamp	2019–20	Ligue 2	1	0	0	0	0	0	—		1	0
Guingamp	2020–21	Ligue 2	16	0	0	0	—		—		16	0
Guingamp	2021–22	Ligue 2	3	0	0	0	—		—		3	0
Guingamp	Total		77	0	5	0	5	0	—		87	0
Beşiktaş (loan)	2019–20	Süper Lig	9	0	2	0	—		6 (Note: Appearances in UEFA Europa League)	0	17	0
Paços Ferreira (loan)	2020–21	Primeira Liga	20	0	0	0	0	0	—		20	0
Lech Poznań	2021–22	Ekstraklasa	21	1	2	0	—		—		23	1
Lech Poznań	2022–23	Ekstraklasa	19	0	1	0	—		19 (Note: Two appearances in UEFA Champions League, seventeen appearances in UEFA Europa Conference League)	0	39	0
Lech Poznań	Total		40	1	3	0	—		19	0	62	1
Al-Khaleej	2023–24	Saudi Pro League	34	0	3	0	—		—		37	0
Career total			269	4	14	0	9	0	25	0	317	4

== Honours ==
Moreirense

- Taça da Liga: 2016–17

Guingamp

- Coupe de la Ligue runner-up: 2018–19

Lech Poznań

- Ekstraklasa: 2021–22
