= 2022–23 RC Strasbourg Alsace season =

RC Strasbourg Alsace
2022–23 season
- President: Marc Keller
- Head coach: Julien Stéphan (until 9 January); Mathieu Le Scornet (interim, from 9 January to 13 February); Frédéric Antonetti (from 13 February)
- Stadium: Stade de la Meinau
- Ligue 1: 15th
- Coupe de France: Round of 64
- Top goalscorer: League: Habib Diallo (20); All: Habib Diallo (20)
Home colours	Away colours	Third colours

The 2022–23 season was the 117th season in the history of RC Strasbourg Alsace and their sixth consecutive season in the top flight. The club participated in Ligue 1 and the Coupe de France.

== Players ==
=== First-team squad ===
As of 31 January 2023.

Note: Flags indicate national team as defined under FIFA eligibility rules; some limited exceptions apply. Players may hold more than one non-FIFA nationality.

No.	Pos.	Nation	Player
1	GK	BEL	Matz Sels
2	DF	FRA	Colin Dagba (on loan from Paris Saint-Germain)
3	DF	FRA	Thomas Delaine
5	DF	FRA	Lucas Perrin
6	MF	CIV	Jean-Eudes Aholou
8	MF	FRA	Morgan Sanson (on loan from Aston Villa)
9	FW	FRA	Kevin Gameiro
11	MF	FRA	Dimitri Liénard (captain)
12	FW	RSA	Lebo Mothiba
14	MF	BIH	Sanjin Prcić
16	GK	JPN	Eiji Kawashima
17	MF	FRA	Jean-Ricner Bellegarde
18	MF	JPN	Yuito Suzuki (on loan from Shimizu S-Pulse)

No.	Pos.	Nation	Player
19	MF	FRA	Habib Diarra
20	FW	SEN	Habib Diallo
22	DF	FRA	Gerzino Nyamsi
23	DF	FRA	Maxime Le Marchand
24	DF	GHA	Alexander Djiku (vice-captain)
27	MF	FRA	Ibrahima Sissoko
29	DF	FRA	Ismaël Doukouré
32	DF	FRA	Frédéric Guilbert
34	MF	MAR	Nordine Kandil
35	DF	FRA	Franci Bouebari
40	GK	FRA	Robin Risser
77	DF	UKR	Eduard Sobol
—	GK	HAI	Alexandre Pierre

=== Out on loan ===
Note: Flags indicate national team as defined under FIFA eligibility rules; some limited exceptions apply. Players may hold more than one non-FIFA nationality.

No.	Pos.	Nation	Player
—	GK	MAR	Alaa Bellaarouch (at Stade Briochin until 30 June 2023)
—	DF	FRA	Maxime Bastian (at Annecy until 30 June 2023)
—	DF	FRA	Marvin Elimbi (at Orléans until 30 June 2023)
—	DF	FRA	Marvin Senaya (at Rodez until 30 June 2023)

No.	Pos.	Nation	Player
—	MF	FRA	Mehdi Chahiri (at Paris FC until 30 June 2023)
—	FW	CIV	Moïse Sahi (at Annecy until 30 June 2023)
—	DF	POL	Karol Fila (at Zulte Waregem until 30 June 2023)

== Transfers ==
=== In ===
Pos.	Player	Transferred from	Fee	Date	Source
DF	(France) Lucas Perrin	(France) Marseille	€1.5 million	1 July 2022	
MF	(France) Jean-Eudes Aholou	(France) Monaco	€3 million	1 July 2022	
DF	(France) Ronaël Pierre-Gabriel	(Germany) Mainz 05	Loan	23 July 2022	
DF	(France) Frédéric Guilbert	(England) Aston Villa	Free	17 January 2023	
DF	(Ukraine) Eduard Sobol	(Belgium) Club Brugge	€2.5 million	23 January 2023	
MF	(France) Morgan Sanson	(England) Aston Villa	Loan	23 January 2023	
FW	(Japan) Yuito Suzuki	(Japan) Shimizu S-Pulse	Loan	27 January 2023	

=== Out ===
Pos.	Player	Transferred to	Fee	Date	Source
MF	(France) Adrien Thomasson	(France) Lens	€3.9 million	12 January 2023	
DF	(France) Ronaël Pierre-Gabriel	(Germany) Mainz 05	Loan return	18 January 2023	
FW	(France) Ludovic Ajorque	(Germany) Mainz 05	€6 million	24 January 2023	

== Pre-season and friendlies ==
Win Draw Loss Fixtures

9 July 2022 Friendly	Strasbourg	2–1	Sion	Divonne-les-Bains
17:30 CEST (UTC+2)	Kandil 57'; Bellegarde 60'		Batata 32'	Stadium: Complexe sportif de Divonne-les-Bains; Attendance: 500; Referee: Toulliou (France)

16 July 2022 Friendly	Charleroi	1–2	Strasbourg	Charleroi, Belgium
19:00 CEST (UTC+2)	Ilaimaharitra 47'	Report	Diarra 49'; Prcić 53'	Stadium: Stade du Pays de Charleroi; Attendance: 3,000; Referee: Ken Vermeiren (Belgium)

19 July 2022 Friendly	Brentford	2–2	Strasbourg	Donaueschingen, Germany
14:30 CEST (UTC+2)	Wissa 36'; Lewis-Potter 86'	Report	Ajorque 9', 61'	Stadium: Sportplatz Aasen; Attendance: 300; Referee: Tobias Reichel (Germany)

23 July 2022 Friendly	Strasbourg	3–3	SC Freiburg	Colmar
16:00 CEST (UTC+2)	Gameiro 68'; Sahi 87'; Aholou 105'		Dōan 14'; Grifo 40'; Kyereh 134'	Stadium: Colmar Stadium; Attendance: 3,500; Referee: Abdelatif Kherradji (France)
Note: Match was played in three 45-minute periods. Rémi Landry took over officiating the match.

27 July 2022 Friendly	Strasbourg	1–2	Cagliari	Strasbourg
19:30 CEST (UTC+2)	Thomasson 19'		Desogus 5'; Pavoletti 18'	Stadium: Stade de la Meinau; Attendance: 8,651; Referee: Aurélien Petit (France)

31 July 2022 Friendly	Liverpool	0–3	Strasbourg	Liverpool, England
19:30 BST (UTC+1)			Thomasson 4', 21'; Diallo 14'	Stadium: Anfield; Attendance: 44,000; Referee: Darren England (England)

7 August 2022 Friendly	Strasbourg	0–3	Versailles	Strasbourg
11:00 CEST (UTC+2)	Aholou (penalty missed) 56'		Gibaud 30'; Vieira 40'; Prunier 51'	Stadium: Stade de la Meinau; Attendance: 0

9 December 2022 Friendly	Strasbourg	Cancelled	Vitesse	Algarve, Portugal
16:00 WET (UTC±0)		Cancellation		Stadium: Estadio da Nora

== Competitions ==
=== Overall record ===
Competition	First match	Last match	Starting round	Final position	Record							
Competition	First match	Last match	Starting round	Final position	Pld	W	D	L	GF	GA	GD	Win %
Ligue 1	6 August 2022	3 June 2023	Matchday 1	15th	38	9	13	16	51	59	−8	23.68
Coupe de France	6 January 2023		Round of 64	Round of 64	1	0	1	0	0	0	+0	0.00
Total					39	9	14	16	51	59	−8	23.08

Source: Soccerway

=== Ligue 1 ===
==== League table ====
Pos	Team	Pld	W	D	L	GF	GA	GD	Pts	Qualification or relegation
13	Toulouse	38	13	9	16	51	57	−6	48	Qualification for the Europa League group stage (Note: Toulouse qualified for the Europa League group stage as the 2022–23 Coupe de France winners.)
14	Brest	38	11	11	16	44	54	−10	44	
15	Strasbourg	38	9	13	16	51	59	−8	40	
16	Nantes	38	7	15	16	37	55	−18	36	
17	Auxerre (R)	38	8	11	19	35	63	−28	35	Relegation to Ligue 2

Source: Ligue 1
Rules for classification: 1) Points; 2) Goal difference; 3) Head-to-head points; 4) Head-to-head goal difference; 5) Head-to-head goals scored; 6) Head-to-head away goals scored; 7) Goals scored; 8) Away goals scored; 9) Fair-play points (Note: Head-to-head record is used only after all the matches between the teams in question have been played).
(R) Relegated

==== Results summary ====
Overall								Home						Away					
Pld	W	D	L	GF	GA	GD	Pts	W	D	L	GF	GA	GD	W	D	L	GF	GA	GD
38	9	13	16	51	59	−8	40	5	7	7	25	26	−1	4	6	9	26	33	−7

Source: Ligue 1

==== Results by round ====
Round	1	2	3	4	5	6	7	8	9	10	11	12	13	14	15	16	17	18	19	20	21	22	23	24	25	26	27	28	29	30	31	32	33	34	35	36	37	38
Ground	H	A	H	A	H	A	H	A	H	A	H	A	H	A	H	A	H	H	A	H	A	H	A	H	A	H	A	H	A	A	H	A	H	A	H	A	H	A
Result	L	D	D	L	D	D	D	L	L	W	L	D	D	L	D	L	L	D	W	L	L	W	L	W	D	L	D	W	L	L	W	W	L	W	W	D	D	L
Position	16	15	14	17	18	18	17	18	19	14	17	16	17	18	19	19	19	19	16	17	18	17	17	15	15	16	15	15	16	17	17	15	16	14	14	15	15	15

Source: Ligue 1
A = Away; H = Home; W = Win; D = Draw; L = Loss

==== Matches ====
The league fixtures were announced on 17 June 2022.

6 August 2022 1	Strasbourg	1–2	Monaco	Strasbourg
17:00 CEST (UTC+2)	Diallo 65'	Report	Diatta 43', (yellow card) 83'; Diop 53'; Fofana (yellow card) 80'	Stadium: Stade de la Meinau; Attendance: 25,359; Referee: François Letexier

14 August 2022 2	Nice	1–1	Strasbourg	Nice
17:05 CEST (UTC+2)	Delort 35' (pen.); Rosario (yellow card) 77'	Report	Nyamsi (yellow card) 34'; Le Marchand (yellow card) 45+1'; Delaine (yellow card) 47'; Gameiro 56'; Thomasson (yellow card) 67'	Stadium: Allianz Riviera; Attendance: 24,707; Referee: Hakim Ben El Hadj

21 August 2022 3	Strasbourg	1–1	Reims	Strasbourg
13:00 CEST (UTC+2)	Djiku (yellow card) 39', (goal) 45+2'	Report	Busi (yellow card) 13'; Munetsi (yellow card) 70'; Balogun 80'; Cajuste (yellow card) 87'; Faes (yellow card) 90'	Stadium: Stade de la Meinau; Attendance: 25,175; Referee: Ruddy Buquet

27 August 2022 4	Auxerre	1–0	Strasbourg	Auxerre
17:00 CEST (UTC+2)	Perrin 29'	Report	Bellegarde (yellow card) 25'	Stadium: Stade de l'Abbé-Deschamps; Attendance: 16,059; Referee: Johan Hamel

31 August 2022 5	Strasbourg	1–1	Nantes	Strasbourg
19:00 CEST (UTC+2)	Diallo 28'	Report	Moutoussamy (yellow card) 34'; Fábio (yellow card) 69'; Mohamed 85'; Descamps (yellow card) 89'	Stadium: Stade de la Meinau; Attendance: 25,162; Referee: Clément Turpin

4 September 2022 6	Brest	1–1	Strasbourg	Brest
15:00 CEST (UTC+2)	Lees-Melou 6'; Brassier (yellow card) 44'; Belkebla (yellow card) 52'; Belaïli (yellow card) 64'	Report	Ajorque 28' (pen.); Prcić (red card) 31'; Pierre-Gabriel (yellow card) 79'	Stadium: Stade Francis-Le Blé; Attendance: 11,003; Referee: Bastien Dechepy

11 September 2022 7	Strasbourg	0–0	Clermont	Strasbourg
13:00 CEST (UTC+2)	Ajorque (yellow card) 25'; Le Marchand (yellow card) 43' (yellow-red card) 89'; Sels (yellow card) 43'	Report	Andrić (yellow card) 26'; Caufriez (yellow card) 60'	Stadium: Stade de la Meinau; Attendance: 25,089; Referee: Marc Bollengier

17 September 2022 8	Montpellier	2–1	Strasbourg	Montpellier
17:00 CEST (UTC+2)	Nordin 17', (yellow card) 41'; Chotard (yellow card) 30'; Estève (yellow card) 64'; Cozza (yellow card) 90+4'; Savanier 90+5' (pen.)	Report	Aholou (yellow card) 20'; Bellegarde (yellow card) 45+5'; Doukouré (yellow card) 69'; Diallo 85'; Djiku (yellow card) 90+4'	Stadium: Stade de la Mosson; Attendance: 10,780; Referee: Jérémy Stinat

1 October 2022 9	Strasbourg	1–3	Rennes	Strasbourg
17:00 CEST (UTC+2)	Nyamsi (red card) 28'; Diallo 72' (pen.)	Report	Kalimuendo 38'; Terrier 49'; Gouiri 61'; Traoré (yellow card) 71'; Majer (yellow card) 90'	Stadium: Stade de la Meinau; Attendance: 25,226; Referee: Eric Wattellier

9 October 2022 10	Angers	2–3	Strasbourg	Angers
15:00 CEST (UTC+2)	Hunou 11'; Mendy (yellow card) 32'; Blažič 87'	Report	Gameiro 7'; Blažič 33' (o.g.); Diallo 58'; Pierre-Gabriel (yellow card) 90+4'	Stadium: Stade Raymond Kopa; Attendance: 8,000; Referee: Clément Turpin

14 October 2022 11	Strasbourg	0–3	Lille	Strasbourg
21:00 CEST (UTC+2)	Le Marchand (yellow card) 19'; Prcić (yellow card) 22'; Nyamsi (yellow card) 81'	Report	André (yellow card) 17'; David 41', 76'; Cabella 80'	Stadium: Stade de la Meinau; Attendance: 25,313; Referee: Jérémie Pignard

23 October 2022 12	Toulouse	2–2	Strasbourg	Toulouse
15:00 CEST (UTC+2)	Nicolaisen (yellow card) 40' (yellow-red card) 71'; Rouault 44'; Dejaegere 55'	Report	Liénard (yellow card) 31'; Mothiba 65'; Gameiro (penalty missed) 73', 73'	Stadium: Stadium de Toulouse; Attendance: 21,622; Referee: Jérémy Stinat

29 October 2022 13	Strasbourg	2–2	Marseille	Strasbourg
21:00 CEST (UTC+2)	Mothiba 76'; Gameiro 90+3'	Report	Dieng 8', (yellow card) 52'; Kaboré 35'; Tavares (yellow card) 70'	Stadium: Stade de la Meinau; Attendance: 25,687; Referee: Ruddy Buquet

5 November 2022 14	Ajaccio	4–2	Strasbourg	Ajaccio
17:00 CET (UTC+1)	Belaïli 33' (pen.), 40' (pen.), (penalty missed) 63'; El Idrissy 34'; Nouri 45+3'; Vidal (red card) 79'	Report	Bellegarde 6'; Gameiro 17'; Pierre-Gabriel (yellow card) 22'; Delaine (yellow card) 32'; Le Marchand (yellow card) 62'; Dagba (yellow card) 90+2'	Stadium: Stade François Coty; Attendance: 7,203; Referee: Mathieu Vernice

13 November 2022 15	Strasbourg	1–1	Lorient	Strasbourg
17:05 CET (UTC+1)	Aholou (yellow card) 22'; Thomasson (yellow card) 42'; Bellegarde (yellow card) 85'; Diallo 87'; Liénard (yellow card) 89'	Report	Moffi 5'; Innocent (yellow card) 26'	Stadium: Stade de la Meinau; Attendance: 25,117; Referee: Pierre Gaillouste

28 December 2022 16	Paris Saint-Germain	2–1	Strasbourg	Paris
21:00 CET (UTC+1)	Marquinhos 14'; Verratti (yellow card) 49'; Neymar (yellow card) 60' (yellow-red card) 61'; Mbappé (yellow card) 90', (goal) 90+5' (pen.)	Report	Nyamsi (yellow card) 48'; Marquinhos 50' (o.g.)	Stadium: Parc des Princes; Attendance: 47,000; Referee: Clément Turpin

2 January 2023 17	Strasbourg	2–3	Troyes	Strasbourg
17:05 CET (UTC+1)	Diallo 41'; Doukouré 54', (yellow card) 60'	Report	Ripart 16'; Lopes 20'; Larouci (yellow card) 61'; Conté (yellow card) 70'; T. Baldé (yellow card) 70'; Chavalerin 78'	Stadium: Stade de la Meinau; Attendance: 25,135; Referee: Benoît Millot

11 January 2023 18	Strasbourg	2–2	Lens	Strasbourg
21:00 CET (UTC+1)	Prcić 13'; Gameiro 16'; Perrin (yellow card) 27'	Report	Onana (yellow card) 4'; Claude-Maurice 11'; Openda 33'	Stadium: Stade de la Meinau; Attendance: 25,624; Referee: François Letexier

14 January 2023 19	Lyon	1–2	Strasbourg	Décines-Charpieu
21:00 CET (UTC+1)	Lacazette 45+2' (pen.); Lovren (yellow card) 56'	Report	Aholou 29', (yellow card) 59'; Diallo 32', (yellow card) 60'; Diarra (yellow card) 80'	Stadium: Parc Olympique Lyonnais; Attendance: 38,473; Referee: Jérémy Stinat

29 January 2023 20	Strasbourg	1–2	Toulouse	Strasbourg
15:00 CET (UTC+1)	Gameiro 20', (red card) 90+3'; Doukouré (yellow card) 47'	Report	Dallinga 25', 51'; Aboukhlal (yellow card) 74'	Stadium: Stade de la Meinau; Attendance: 25,196; Referee: Willy Delajod

1 February 2023 21	Rennes	3–0	Strasbourg	Rennes
21:00 CET (UTC+1)	Gouiri 3', 21'; D. Doué 51'	Report	Guilbert (yellow card) 15'	Stadium: Roazhon Park; Attendance: 28,176; Referee: Marc Bollengier

5 February 2023 22	Strasbourg	2–0	Montpellier	Strasbourg
15:00 CET (UTC+1)	Diallo 1', 45', (yellow card) 75'; Aholou (red card) 33'; Liénard (yellow card) 37'	Report	Fayad (yellow card) 37'; Sels (yellow card) 84'	Stadium: Stade de la Meinau; Attendance: 25,028; Referee: Stéphanie Frappart

12 February 2023 23	Lille	2–0	Strasbourg	Villeneuve-d'Ascq
15:00 CET (UTC+1)	David 23' (pen.), 28'; Virginius (yellow card) 80'	Report	Prcić (yellow card) 36'; Dagba (yellow card) 88'	Stadium: Stade Pierre-Mauroy; Attendance: 30,812; Referee: Hakim Ben El Hadj

18 February 2023 24	Strasbourg	2–1	Angers	Strasbourg
21:00 CET (UTC+1)	Diallo 14', 42'; Le Marchand (yellow card) 35'; Sobol (yellow card) 72'; Djiku (yellow card) 74'	Report	Capelle (yellow card) 20'; Hountondji (yellow card) 40'; Bentaleb 73' (pen.)	Stadium: Stade de la Meinau; Attendance: 25,062; Referee: François Letexier

26 February 2023 25	Clermont	1–1	Strasbourg	Clermont-Ferrand
15:00 CET (UTC+1)	Konaté (yellow card) 17'; Rashani 65'	Report	Sanson (yellow card) 21'; Djiku (yellow card) 23'; Diallo 34'; Guilbert (yellow card) 44'; Doukouré (yellow card) 67'	Stadium: Stade Gabriel Montpied; Attendance: 10,221; Referee: Willy Delajod

5 March 2023 26	Strasbourg	0–1	Brest	Strasbourg
15:00 CET (UTC+1)	Guilbert (yellow card) 43'; Doukouré (yellow card) 66'	Report	Honorat 45+2'; Bizot (yellow card) 90+6'	Stadium: Stade de la Meinau; Attendance: 25,123; Referee: Ruddy Buquet

12 March 2023 27	Marseille	2–2	Strasbourg	Marseille
20:45 CET (UTC+1)	Balerdi (red card) 28'; Mbemba 48'; Sánchez 75' (pen.)	Report	Delaine (yellow card) 5'; Nyamsi (yellow card) 39'; Djiku (yellow card) 71'; Sobol (yellow card) 82'; Aholou 87', 88'	Stadium: Stade Vélodrome; Attendance: 63,380; Referee: Jérémie Pignard

19 March 2023 28	Strasbourg	2–0	Auxerre	Strasbourg
15:00 CET (UTC+1)	Nyamsi 4'; Perrin (yellow card) 43'; Liénard (yellow card) 55'; Diallo 84'	Report	Touré (yellow card) 18'	Stadium: Stade de la Meinau; Attendance: 25,530; Referee: Eric Wattellier

2 April 2023 29	Monaco	4–3	Strasbourg	Monaco
17:05 CEST (UTC+2)	Vanderson 19'; Camara (yellow card) 40'; Fofana (yellow card) 45+3' (yellow-red card) 78', (goal) 65'; Ben Seghir 54'; Diop 58'	Report	Mothiba 32'; Maripán 41' (o.g.); Diarra (yellow card) 53'; Diallo 90+3'	Stadium: Stade Louis II; Attendance: 5,356; Referee: Willy Delajod

7 April 2023 30	Lens	2–1	Strasbourg	Lens
21:00 CEST (UTC+2)	Frankowski 10'; Abdul Samed (yellow card) 45+2'; Medina 64'	Report	Bellegarde (yellow card) 22'; Djiku (yellow card) 78'; Gameiro 83'; Perrin (yellow card) 87'; Diallo (yellow card) 90+3' (yellow-red card) 90+3'	Stadium: Stade Bollaert-Delelis; Attendance: 38,223; Referee: Pierre Gaillouste

16 April 2023 31	Strasbourg	3–1	Ajaccio	Strasbourg
15:00 CEST (UTC+2)	Gameiro 26' (pen.); Diarra 71', (yellow card) 90+3'; Prcić (yellow card) 78'; Suzuki 89'	Report	El Idrissy (yellow card) 34'; Coutadeur (yellow card) 63'; Avinel (yellow card) 70'; Barreto 76'; Diallo (yellow card) 83'; Koné (yellow card) 90+3'	Stadium: Stade de la Meinau; Attendance: 25,130; Referee: Stéphanie Frappart

23 April 2023 32	Reims	0–2	Strasbourg	Reims
13:00 CEST (UTC+2)	Lopy (yellow card) 18'; Agbadou (yellow card) 75'	Report	Diallo 1', 37'; Djiku (yellow card) 26'	Stadium: Stade Auguste Delaune; Attendance: 13,737; Referee: Clément Turpin

28 April 2023 33	Strasbourg	1–2	Lyon	Strasbourg
21:00 CEST (UTC+2)	Sanson 14'; Aholou (yellow card) 38'; Djiku (yellow card) 45'	Report	Lukeba 31', (yellow card) 67' (yellow-red card) 90+1'; Diomandé (yellow card) 34'; Caqueret 35'; Kumbedi (yellow card) 78'	Stadium: Stade de la Meinau; Attendance: 25,360; Referee: Ruddy Buquet

7 May 2023 34	Nantes	0–2	Strasbourg	Nantes
15:00 CEST (UTC+2)	João Victor (yellow card) 45'; Coco (yellow card) 53'; Mollet (yellow card) 76'	Report	Diallo 27' (pen.); Diarra 47'; Dagba (yellow card) 68'	Stadium: Stade de la Beaujoire; Attendance: 28,563; Referee: Benoît Bastien

14 May 2023 35	Strasbourg	2–0	Nice	Strasbourg
17:00 CEST (UTC+2)	Diallo 1', 59' (pen.); Sissoko (yellow card) 90'	Report	Dante (yellow card) 73'	Stadium: Stade de la Meinau; Attendance: 25,147; Referee: Jérémy Stinat

21 May 2023 36	Troyes	1–1	Strasbourg	Troyes
15:00 CEST (UTC+2)	Palmer-Brown (yellow card) 22'; Gallon (red card) 58'; Lopes 73'	Report	Diarra 27'; Perrin (yellow card) 55'; Djiku (red card) 72'	Stadium: Stade de l'Aube; Attendance: 9,834; Referee: Clément Turpin

27 May 2023 37	Strasbourg	1–1	Paris Saint-Germain	Strasbourg
21:00 CEST (UTC+2)	Diarra (yellow card) 23'; Gameiro 79'	Report	Vitinha (yellow card) 6'; Messi 59'; Verratti (yellow card) 75'	Stadium: Stade de la Meinau; Attendance: 25,828; Referee: Jérôme Brisard

3 June 2023 38	Lorient	2–1	Strasbourg	Lorient
21:00 CEST (UTC+2)	Faivre 10', 36'; Abergel (yellow card) 88'	Report	Bellegarde 56', (yellow card) 65'	Stadium: Stade du Moustoir; Attendance: 16,351; Referee: Bastien Dechepy

=== Coupe de France ===
6 January 2023 Round of 64	Strasbourg	0–0 (4–5 p)	Angers	Strasbourg
18:00 CET (UTC+1)		Report		Stadium: Stade de la Meinau; Attendance: 10,323; Referee: Willy Delajod
	Penalties
	Diallo (penalty scored); Mothiba (penalty scored); Thomasson (penalty scored); Bellegarde (penalty missed); Diarra (penalty scored); Nyamsi (penalty missed)		(penalty scored) Abdelli; (penalty scored) Sima; (penalty scored) Mendy; (penalty scored) Salama; (penalty missed) Bentaleb; (penalty scored) Camara
