= 2021–22 RC Strasbourg Alsace season =

RC Strasbourg Alsace
2021–22 season
- President: Marc Keller
- Head coach: Julien Stéphan
- Stadium: Stade de la Meinau
- Ligue 1: 6th
- Coupe de France: Round of 32
- Top goalscorer: League: Ludovic Ajorque (12); All: Ludovic Ajorque; Habib Diallo (12 each)
| Home colours | Away colours | Third colours |

The 2021–22 season was the 116th season in the existence of RC Strasbourg Alsace and the club's fifth consecutive season in the top flight of French football. In addition to the domestic league, Strasbourg participated in this season's edition of the Coupe de France.

== Players ==
=== First-team squad ===
As of 22 March 2022.

Note: Flags indicate national team as defined under FIFA eligibility rules; some limited exceptions apply. Players may hold more than one non-FIFA nationality.

| No. | Pos. | Nation | Player |
|---|---|---|---|
| 1 | GK | BEL | Matz Sels |
| 2 | DF | FRA | Frédéric Guilbert (on loan from Aston Villa) |
| 4 | DF | POL | Karol Fila |
| 5 | DF | FRA | Lucas Perrin (on loan from Marseille) |
| 6 | MF | CIV | Jean-Eudes Aholou (on loan from Monaco) |
| 8 | FW | GHA | Abdul Majeed Waris |
| 9 | FW | FRA | Kevin Gameiro |
| 10 | MF | FRA | Adrien Thomasson |
| 11 | MF | FRA | Dimitri Liénard (captain) |
| 14 | MF | BIH | Sanjin Prcić |
| 15 | FW | CIV | Moïse Sahi |
| 16 | GK | JPN | Eiji Kawashima |
| 17 | MF | FRA | Jean-Ricner Bellegarde |

| No. | Pos. | Nation | Player |
|---|---|---|---|
| 19 | MF | FRA | Anthony Caci |
| 20 | FW | SEN | Habib Diallo |
| 22 | DF | FRA | Gerzino Nyamsi |
| 23 | DF | FRA | Maxime Le Marchand |
| 24 | DF | GHA | Alexander Djiku (vice-captain) |
| 25 | FW | FRA | Ludovic Ajorque |
| 27 | MF | FRA | Ibrahima Sissoko |
| 29 | DF | FRA | Ismaël Doukouré |
| 31 | FW | MLI | Moïse Sahi |
| 35 | MF | FRA | Nordine Kandil |
| 36 | GK | MAR | Alaa Bellaarouch |
| 37 | MF | COM | Aymeric Ahmed |
| 38 | MF | FRA | Habib Diarra |

=== Out on loan ===
Note: Flags indicate national team as defined under FIFA eligibility rules; some limited exceptions apply. Players may hold more than one non-FIFA nationality.

| No. | Pos. | Nation | Player |
|---|---|---|---|
| — | GK | HAI | Alexandre Pierre (on loan to Annecy) |
| — | GK | SEN | Bingourou Kamara (on loan to R. Charleroi) |
| — | DF | FRA | Marvin Senaya (on loan to Sochaux) |
| — | DF | FRA | Maxime Bastian (on loan to Annecy) |

| No. | Pos. | Nation | Player |
|---|---|---|---|
| — | MF | FRA | Mahamé Siby (on loan to Paris FC) |
| — | MF | FRA | Mehdi Chahiri (on loan to Caen) |
| — | FW | RSA | Lebo Mothiba (on loan to Troyes) |

== Transfers ==
=== In ===
| No. | Pos | Player | Transferred from | Fee | Date | Source |
|---|---|---|---|---|---|---|
| 40 | GK | (Haiti) Alexandre Pierre | (France) RC Strasbourg B | Promoted | 1 July 2021 | |
| 4 | DF | (Poland) Karol Fila | (Poland) Lechia Gdańsk | €1.500.000 | 1 July 2021 | |
| 5 | DF | (France) Lucas Perrin | (France) Olympique Marseille | Loan | 14 July 2021 | |
| 23 | DF | (France) Maxime Le Marchand | (England) Fulham | Free transfer | 26 August 2021 | |

=== Out ===
| No. | Pos | Player | Transferred to | Fee | Date | Source |
|---|---|---|---|---|---|---|
| – | DF | (Cameroon) Duplexe Tchamba | (Denmark) SønderjyskE | Undisclosed | 1 July 2021 | |
| – | MF | (Tunisia) Moataz Zemzemi | (France) Niort | Undisclosed | 5 August 2021 | |

== Pre-season and friendlies ==
Win Draw Loss Fixtures

| 9 July 2021 Friendly | Strasbourg | 0–1 | Basel | Colmar, France |
| 18:30 CEST (UTC+2) | | Report | Sene 4' | Stadium: Colmar Stadium; Attendance: 1,600 |

| 13 July 2021 Friendly | Young Boys | 2–2 | Strasbourg | Montreux, Switzerland |
| 19:00 CEST (UTC+2) | Garcia (penalty missed) 8'; Siebatcheu 27'; Ngamaleu (penalty missed) 69'; Mambimbi 77' | Report | Thomasson 5'; Sahi 85' | Stadium: Stade de Chailly |

| 17 July 2021 Friendly | Strasbourg | Cancelled | Cercle Brugge | Évian-les-Bains, France |
| 18:00 CEST (UTC+2) | | Report | | Stadium: Stade Camille Fournier |

| 24 July 2021 Friendly | Eintracht Frankfurt | 2–3 | Strasbourg | Frankfurt, Germany |
| 17:00 CEST (UTC+2) | Hrustic 6', 22' | Report | Ajorque 20'; Thomasson 52'; Diallo 82' | Stadium: Deutsche Bank Park; Attendance: 0 |

| 31 July 2021 Friendly | Strasbourg | 2–1 | SC Freiburg | Strasbourg, France |
| 16:30 CEST (UTC+2) | Gameiro 39'; Waris 64' | Report | Keitel 89' | Stadium: Stade de la Meinau; Attendance: 10,000 |

| 31 July 2021 Friendly | Strasbourg | 1–2 | SC Freiburg | Strasbourg, France |
| 18:30 CEST (UTC+2) | Chahiri 28' | Report | Furrer 2'; Heintz 88' (pen.) | Stadium: Stade de la Meinau; Attendance: 10,000 |

| 31 July 2021 Friendly | Troyes | Cancelled | Strasbourg | France |
| --:-- CEST (UTC+2) |

| 31 July 2021 Friendly | Strasbourg | Cancelled | Fribourg | Strasbourg, France |
| 17:30 CEST (UTC+2) | | | | Stadium: Stade de la Meinau |

| 31 July 2021 Friendly | Strasbourg | Cancelled | Fribourg | Strasbourg, France |
| 19:30 CEST (UTC+2) | | | | Stadium: Stade de la Meinau |

== Competitions ==
=== Overall record ===
| Competition | First match | Last match | Starting round | Final position | Record | | | | | | | |
| Competition | First match | Last match | Starting round | Final position | Pld | W | D | L | GF | GA | GD | Win % |
|---|---|---|---|---|---|---|---|---|---|---|---|---|
| Ligue 1 | 8 August 2021 | 21 May 2022 | Matchday 1 | 6th | 38 | 17 | 12 | 9 | 60 | 43 | +17 | 44.74 |
| Coupe de France | 16 December 2021 | 2 January 2022 | Round of 64 | Round of 32 | 2 | 1 | 0 | 1 | 1 | 1 | +0 | 50.00 |
| Total | | | | | 40 | 18 | 12 | 10 | 61 | 44 | +17 | 45.00 |

Source: Soccerway

=== Ligue 1 ===
==== League table ====
| Pos | Team | Pld | W | D | L | GF | GA | GD | Pts | Qualification or relegation |
|---|---|---|---|---|---|---|---|---|---|---|
| 4 | Rennes | 38 | 20 | 6 | 12 | 82 | 40 | +42 | 66 | Qualification for the Europa League group stage |
| 5 | Nice | 38 | 20 | 7 | 11 | 52 | 36 | +16 | 66 (Note: Nice were deducted one point for uncontrolled crowd trouble that caused the abandonment of their match against Marseille.) | Qualification for the Europa Conference League play-off round |
| 6 | Strasbourg | 38 | 17 | 12 | 9 | 60 | 43 | +17 | 63 | |
| 7 | Lens | 38 | 17 | 11 | 10 | 62 | 48 | +14 | 62 | |
| 8 | Lyon | 38 | 17 | 11 | 10 | 66 | 51 | +15 | 61 (Note: Lyon were deducted one point for uncontrolled crowd trouble that caused the abandonment of their match against Marseille.) | |

Source: Ligue 1
Rules for classification: 1) Points; 2) Goal difference; 3) Head-to-head points; 4) Head-to-head goal difference; 5) Head-to-head goals scored; 6) Head-to-head away goals scored; 7) Goals scored; 8) Away goals scored; 9) Fair-play points (Note: Head-to-head record is used only after all the matches between the teams in question have been played).

==== Results summary ====
| Overall | | | | | | | | Home | | | | | | Away | | | | | |
| Pld | W | D | L | GF | GA | GD | Pts | W | D | L | GF | GA | GD | W | D | L | GF | GA | GD |
|---|---|---|---|---|---|---|---|---|---|---|---|---|---|---|---|---|---|---|---|
| 38 | 17 | 12 | 9 | 60 | 43 | +17 | 63 | 11 | 5 | 3 | 36 | 18 | +18 | 6 | 7 | 6 | 24 | 25 | −1 |

Source: Ligue 1

==== Results by round ====
| Round | 1 | 2 | 3 | 4 | 5 | 6 | 7 | 8 | 9 | 10 | 11 | 12 | 13 | 14 | 15 | 16 | 17 | 18 | 19 | 20 | 21 | 22 | 23 | 24 | 25 | 26 | 27 | 28 | 29 | 30 | 31 | 32 | 33 | 34 | 35 | 36 | 37 | 38 |
|---|---|---|---|---|---|---|---|---|---|---|---|---|---|---|---|---|---|---|---|---|---|---|---|---|---|---|---|---|---|---|---|---|---|---|---|---|---|---|
| Ground | H | A | H | H | A | H | A | H | A | H | A | H | A | H | A | H | A | H | A | A | H | A | H | A | A | H | A | H | A | H | H | A | H | A | H | A | H | A |
| Result | L | L | D | W | L | W | W | L | D | W | L | W | D | D | D | W | W | L | W | W | W | L | W | W | D | D | D | W | D | W | D | D | W | L | D | W | W | L |
| Position | 20 | 20 | 20 | 13 | 15 | 12 | 9 | 12 | 12 | 8 | 12 | 7 | 8 | 7 | 8 | 6 | 6 | 7 | 10 | 8 | 7 | 4 | 4 | 4 | 4 | 5 | 5 | 5 | 5 | 4 | 4 | 5 | 4 | 6 | 6 | 6 | 5 | 6 |

Source: Ligue 1
A = Away; H = Home; W = Win; D = Draw; L = Loss

==== Matches ====
The league fixtures were announced on 25 June 2021.

| 8 August 2021 1 | Strasbourg | 0–2 | Angers | Strasbourg |
| 15:00 CEST (UTC+2) | Djiku (yellow card) 18'; Liénard (yellow card) 40' | Report | Taïbi (yellow card) 35'; Mangani (yellow card) 41'; Traoré 57'; Thomas (yellow card) 79'; Bahoken 81' | Stadium: Stade de la Meinau; Attendance: 23,250; Referee: Jérémy Stinat |

| 14 August 2021 2 | Paris Saint-Germain | 4–2 | Strasbourg | Paris |
| 21:00 CEST (UTC+2) | Icardi 3'; Ajorque 25' (o.g.); Draxler 27'; Dina Ebimbe (yellow card) 51'; Sarabia 86' | Report | Gameiro 53'; Fila (yellow card) 60'; Ajorque 64'; Djiku (yellow card) 80' (yellow-red card) 81'; Bellegarde (yellow card) 90+3' | Stadium: Parc des Princes; Attendance: 46,962; Referee: Willy Delajod |

| 22 August 2021 3 | Strasbourg | 1–1 | Troyes | Strasbourg |
| 15:00 CEST (UTC+2) | Fila (yellow card) 39'; Perrin (yellow card) 43'; Waris (yellow card) 75'; Thomasson 77' | Report | Touzghar 19'; Biancone (yellow card) 35' | Stadium: Stade de la Meinau; Attendance: 22,185; Referee: Jérôme Brisard |

| 29 August 2021 4 | Strasbourg | 3–1 | Brest | Strasbourg |
| 15:00 CEST (UTC+2) | Prcić 24'; Duverne 42' (o.g.); Fila (yellow card) 55'; Thomasson 84' | Report | Cardona 26'; Pierre-Gabriel (yellow card) 86' | Stadium: Stade de la Meinau; Attendance: 22,341; Referee: Romain Lissorgue |

| 12 September 2021 5 | Lyon | 3–1 | Strasbourg | Décines-Charpieu |
| 20:45 CEST (UTC+2) | Dembélé 8'; Diomandé (yellow card) 29'; Denayer 64'; Boateng (yellow card) 84'; Paquetá 87' | Report | Djiku (yellow card) 47'; Diallo 90+6' (pen.) | Stadium: Parc Olympique Lyonnais; Attendance: 33,267; Referee: Ruddy Buquet |

| 17 September 2021 6 | Strasbourg | 3–0 | Metz | Strasbourg |
| 21:00 CEST (UTC+2) | Ajorque 6' (pen.), (yellow card) 18'; Diallo 26', 40'; Nyamsi (yellow card) 29' | Report | Centonze (yellow card) 28'; Kouyaté (yellow card) 44'; Traoré (yellow card) 84'; Joseph (yellow card) 90+1' | Stadium: Stade de la Meinau; Attendance: 25,437; Referee: Eric Wattellier |

| 22 September 2021 7 | Lens | 0–1 | Strasbourg | Lens |
| 21:00 CEST (UTC+2) | Doucouré (yellow card) 11'; Danso (red card) 50'; Kalimuendo (yellow card) 77' | Report | Djiku (yellow card) 56'; Diallo (yellow card) 63'; Ajorque 67'; Le Marchand (yellow card) 85' | Stadium: Stade Bollaert-Delelis; Attendance: 0 Referee: Jérémy Stinat |

| 25 September 2021 8 | Strasbourg | 1–2 | Lille | Strasbourg |
| 19:00 CEST (UTC+2) | Diallo (yellow card) 19'; Djiku (yellow card) 38'; Le Marchand (yellow card) 38'; Sissoko 75'; Thomasson (red card) 79'; Ajorque (yellow card) 83' | Report | David 23', 57' (pen.); Grbić (yellow card) 70'; Djaló (yellow card) 78'; Xeka (yellow card) 81'; Mandava (yellow card) 90+1' | Stadium: Stade de la Meinau; Attendance: 23,762; Referee: François Letexier |

| 2 October 2021 9 | Montpellier | 1–1 | Strasbourg | Montpellier |
| 17:00 CEST (UTC+2) | Mollet 12', (yellow card) 54'; Sakho (yellow card) 90+1' | Report | Gameiro 28' | Stadium: Stade de la Mosson; Attendance: 9,851; Referee: Hakim Ben El Hadj |

| 17 October 2021 10 | Strasbourg | 5–1 | Saint-Étienne | Strasbourg |
| 15:00 CEST (UTC+2) | Guilbert (yellow card) 19'; Le Marchand 26', (yellow card) 45+3'; Youssouf 38' (o.g.); Gameiro 69'; Ajorque 73'; Caci (yellow card) 83'; Diallo 85' | Report | Moukoudi (yellow card) 11'; Youssouf (red card) 44'; Khazri 45+5' (pen.); Gourna-Douath (yellow card) 88' | Stadium: Stade de la Meinau; Attendance: 25,371; Referee: Mikael Lesage |

| 24 October 2021 11 | Rennes | 1–0 | Strasbourg | Rennes |
| 15:00 CEST (UTC+2) | Martin (yellow card) 6'; Aguerd 82' | Report | Le Marchand (yellow card) 32'; Caci (yellow card) 58' | Stadium: Roazhon Park; Attendance: 27,185; Referee: Stéphanie Frappart |

| 31 October 2021 12 | Strasbourg | 4–0 | Lorient | Strasbourg |
| 15:00 CET (UTC+1) | Ajorque 28'; Sissoko (yellow card) 36'; Diallo 39', 45+1'; Thomasson 64' | Report | | Stadium: Stade de la Meinau; Attendance: 24,002; Referee: Florent Batta |

| 7 November 2021 13 | Nantes | 2–2 | Strasbourg | Nantes |
| 15:00 CET (UTC+1) | Pallois (yellow card) 5'; Coulibaly 20'; Kolo Muani 48' | Report | Diallo 44'; Thomasson 68' | Stadium: Stade de la Beaujoire; Attendance: 18,853; Referee: Clément Turpin |

| 21 November 2021 14 | Strasbourg | 1–1 | Reims | Strasbourg |
| 15:00 CET (UTC+1) | Gameiro (penalty missed) 42'; Thomasson (yellow card) 58'; Bellegarde 90+6' | Report | Ekitike 22'; Gravillon (yellow card) 38'; Matusiwa (yellow card) 43'; Flips (yellow card) 67'; Abdelhamid (yellow card) 90+5' | Stadium: Stade de la Meinau; Attendance: 24,439; Referee: Amaury Delerue |

| 28 November 2021 15 | Monaco | 1–1 | Strasbourg | Monaco |
| 15:00 CET (UTC+1) | Ben Yedder 45+1' (pen.); Fofana (yellow card) 47'; Volland (yellow card) 68' | Report | Sissoko (yellow card) 16'; Ajorque 47' (pen.) | Stadium: Stade Louis II; Attendance: 3,478; Referee: Antony Gautier |

| 1 December 2021 16 | Strasbourg | 5–2 | Bordeaux | Strasbourg |
| 19:00 CET (UTC+1) | Prcić (yellow card) 14'; Thomasson 22'; Djiku (yellow card) 36'; Gameiro 43' (pen.); Ajorque 45+1', 65'; Liénard 48' | Report | Hwang 7'; Kwateng (yellow card) 18'; Gregersen (yellow card) 43'; Elis 57', (yellow card) 70' | Stadium: Stade de la Meinau; Attendance: 24,378; Referee: Willy Delajod |

| 5 December 2021 17 | Nice | 0–3 | Strasbourg | Nice |
| 17:00 CET (UTC+1) | Daniliuc (yellow card) 45+1'; Atal (yellow card) 66'; Rosario (yellow card) 84' | Report | Ajorque 21', (yellow card) 45+3'; Sissoko (yellow card) 35'; Bellegarde (yellow card) 47'; Diallo 82'; Thomasson 84' | Stadium: Allianz Riviera; Attendance: 16,220; Referee: Jérémie Pignard |

| 12 December 2021 18 | Strasbourg | 0–2 | Marseille | Strasbourg |
| 17:00 CET (UTC+1) | Ajorque (yellow card) 49'; Nyamsi (yellow card) 71' | Report | Dieng 62'; Guendouzi (yellow card) 68'; Ćaleta-Car 82' | Stadium: Stade de la Meinau; Attendance: 26,028; Referee: Mikael Lesage |

| 9 January 2022 20 | Metz | 0–2 | Strasbourg | Metz |
| 15:00 CET (UTC+1) | Mbengue (yellow card) 90' | Report | Ajorque 50'; Liénard (yellow card) 80'; Aholou 90+1' | Stadium: Stade Saint-Symphorien; Attendance: 5,000; Referee: Antony Gautier |

| 16 January 2022 21 | Strasbourg | 3–1 | Montpellier | Strasbourg |
| 15:00 CET (UTC+1) | Bellegarde (yellow card) 22'; Kandil (yellow card) 70'; Waris 77'; Thomasson 84'; Gameiro 86' | Report | Mollet 11'; Ferri (yellow card) 59'; Savanier (yellow card) 65'; Wahi (red card) 66' | Stadium: Stade de la Meinau; Attendance: 5,217; Referee: Pierre Gaillouste |

| 19 January 2022 19 | Clermont | 0–2 | Strasbourg | Clermont-Ferrand |
| 19:00 CET (UTC+1) | N'Simba (yellow card) 60'; Dossou (yellow card) 80' | Report | Gameiro 44'; Hountondji 77' (o.g.) | Stadium: Stade Gabriel Montpied; Attendance: 4,219; Referee: Bastien Dechepy |
Note: The match was originally scheduled for 22 December 2021, but was postponed to 19 January 2022 due to fog.

| 23 January 2022 22 | Bordeaux | 4–3 | Strasbourg | Bordeaux |
| 15:00 CET (UTC+1) | Hwang 17', 39', 90'; Elis 21'; Lacoux (yellow card) 34'; Mexer (yellow card) 77'; Fransérgio (yellow card) 84'; Adli (yellow card) 87' | Report | Prcić (yellow card) 37'; Gameiro 43', 57'; Thomasson (yellow card) 89'; Waris 90+6' | Stadium: Matmut Atlantique; Attendance: 3,308; Referee: Mikael Lesage |

| 6 February 2022 23 | Strasbourg | 1–0 | Nantes | Strasbourg |
| 15:00 CET (UTC+1) | Nyamsi (yellow card) 53'; Liénard 74', (yellow card) 82'; Sels (yellow card) 90' | Report | Chirivella (yellow card) 23'; Pallois (yellow card) 48'; Geubbels (yellow card) 78' | Stadium: Stade de la Meinau; Attendance: 22,240; Referee: Amaury Delerue |

| 13 February 2022 24 | Angers | 0–1 | Strasbourg | Angers |
| 15:00 CET (UTC+1) | Cabot (yellow card) 29'; Thomas (yellow card) 68'; Doumbia (yellow card) 83' | Report | Gameiro 11'; Liénard (yellow card) 40' | Stadium: Stade Raymond Kopa; Attendance: 6,521; Referee: Pierre Gaillouste |

| 20 February 2022 25 | Saint-Étienne | 2–2 | Strasbourg | Saint-Étienne |
| 15:00 CET (UTC+1) | Boudebouz 4'; Khazri 34'; Youssouf (yellow card) 45+1'; Kolodziejczak (yellow card) 50'; Mangala (yellow card) 90+4' | Report | Djiku (yellow card) 17'; Diallo 21'; Perrin 30', (yellow card) 66' | Stadium: Stade Geoffroy-Guichard; Attendance: 24,897; Referee: Antony Gautier |

| 26 February 2022 26 | Strasbourg | 0–0 | Nice | Strasbourg |
| 17:00 CET (UTC+1) | Perrin (yellow card) 56' | Report | Dante (yellow card) 19' (yellow-red card) 48'; Kluivert (red card) 85' | Stadium: Stade de la Meinau; Attendance: 25,150; Referee: Stéphanie Frappart |

| 6 March 2022 27 | Reims | 1–1 | Strasbourg | Reims |
| 15:00 CET (UTC+1) | Cajuste 84' | Report | Sissoko (yellow card) 64'; Bellegarde 69'; Guilbert (yellow card) 90+2' | Stadium: Stade Auguste-Delaune; Attendance: 10,405; Referee: Jérémie Pignard |

| 13 March 2022 28 | Strasbourg | 1–0 | Monaco | Strasbourg |
| 15:00 CET (UTC+1) | Djiku 23'; Prcić (yellow card) 65' | Report | Tchouaméni (yellow card) 4'; Diop (yellow card) 44' | Stadium: Stade de la Meinau; Attendance: 25,231; Referee: Eric Wattellier |

| 20 March 2022 29 | Lorient | 0–0 | Strasbourg | Lorient |
| 15:00 CET (UTC+1) | Innocent (yellow card) 22'; Ouattara (yellow card) 76' | Report | Bellegarde (yellow card) 29'; Perrin (yellow card) 89' | Stadium: Stade du Moustoir; Attendance: 9,806; Referee: Benoît Millot |

| 3 April 2022 30 | Strasbourg | 1–0 | Lens | Strasbourg |
| 13:00 CEST (UTC+2) | Guilbert (yellow card) 5'; Liénard (yellow card) 27'; Aholou (yellow card) 37'; Ajorque 67' (pen.); Gameiro (penalty missed) 71' | Report | Doucouré (yellow card) 30' | Stadium: Stade de la Meinau; Attendance: 26,005; Referee: François Letexier |

| 10 April 2022 31 | Strasbourg | 1–1 | Lyon | Strasbourg |
| 19:00 CEST (UTC+2) | Sissoko 20', (yellow card) 90+2'; Aholou (yellow card) 68'; Ajorque (yellow card) 90+1' | Report | Toko Ekambi 90'; Dubois (yellow card) 90+1' | Stadium: Stade de la Meinau; Attendance: 26,073; Referee: Clément Turpin |

| 17 April 2022 32 | Troyes | 1–1 | Strasbourg | Troyes |
| 15:00 CEST (UTC+2) | Tardieu 85' (pen.) | Report | Djiku (yellow card) 45'; Diallo 56' (pen.); Diarra (yellow card) 61' | Stadium: Stade de l'Aube; Attendance: 10,000; Referee: Benoît Millot |

| 20 April 2022 33 | Strasbourg | 2–1 | Rennes | Strasbourg |
| 21:00 CEST (UTC+2) | Diallo 4'; Ajorque 77'; Caci (yellow card) 86' | Report | Terrier 54'; Martin (yellow card) 65'; Aguerd (yellow card) 90' | Stadium: Stade de la Meinau; Attendance: 25,148; Referee: Willy Delajod |

| 24 April 2022 34 | Lille | 1–0 | Strasbourg | Villeneuve-d'Ascq |
| 17:05 CEST (UTC+2) | Gudmundsson (yellow card) 36'; Botman (yellow card) 60'; Çelik 87' | Report | Perrin (yellow card) 40'; Guilbert (yellow card) 70'; Djiku (yellow card) 71' | Stadium: Stade Pierre-Mauroy; Attendance: 30,211; Referee: Jérémie Pignard |

| 29 April 2022 35 | Strasbourg | 3–3 | Paris Saint-Germain | Strasbourg |
| 21:00 CEST (UTC+2) | Gameiro 3'; Bellegarde (yellow card) 8'; Prcić (yellow card) 41'; Liénard (yellow card) 60'; Verratti 75' (o.g.); Caci 90+1' | Report | Mbappé 23', 68'; Hakimi 64'; Neymar (yellow card) 73'; Kimpembe (yellow card) 90+2'; Donnarumma (yellow card) 90+5' | Stadium: Stade de la Meinau; Attendance: 26,052; Referee: Ruddy Buquet |

| 7 May 2022 36 | Brest | 0–1 | Strasbourg | Brest |
| 17:00 CEST (UTC+2) | Satriano (yellow card) 83' | Report | Gameiro 72'; Nyamsi (yellow card) 83'; Liénard (yellow card) 84' | Stadium: Stade Francis-Le Blé; Attendance: 12,094; Referee: Mikael Lesage |

| 14 May 2022 37 | Strasbourg | 1–0 | Clermont | Strasbourg |
| 21:00 CEST (UTC+2) | Thomasson 28'; Liénard (yellow card) 34' | Report | Zedadka (yellow card) 10'; Seidu (yellow card) 48' | Stadium: Stade de la Meinau; Attendance: 25,231; Referee: Benoît Millot |

| 21 May 2022 38 | Marseille | 4–0 | Strasbourg | Marseille |
| 21:00 CEST (UTC+2) | Gerson 32', 89'; Ćaleta-Car (yellow card) 34'; Ünder 73'; Gueye (yellow card) 86'; Bakambu 90+2' | Report | Sissoko (yellow card) 75' | Stadium: Stade Vélodrome; Attendance: 63,873; Referee: Stéphanie Frappart |

=== Coupe de France ===
| 16 December 2021 Round of 64 | Valenciennes | 0–1 | Strasbourg | Valenciennes |
| 21:00 CET (UTC+1) | | Report | Diallo 15'; Djiku (yellow card) 44'; Caci (yellow card) 59' | Stadium: Stade du Hainaut; Attendance: 7,572; Referee: Olivier Tuhal |

| 2 January 2022 Round of 32 | Montpellier | 1–0 | Strasbourg | Montpellier |
| 16:00 CET (UTC+1) | Mollet (yellow card) 12'; Ristić 20'; Bertaud (yellow card) 80' | Report | Diallo (yellow card) 27', (penalty missed) 45+1'; Sissoko (yellow card) 48'; Ajorque (yellow card) 73'; Djiku (yellow card) 90+1' | Stadium: Stade de la Mosson; Attendance: 4,575; Referee: Amaury Delerue |

== Statistics ==
=== Goal scorers ===
| Rank | No. | Pos | Nat | Name | Ligue 1 | Coupe de France | Total |
|---|---|---|---|---|---|---|---|
| 1 | 25 | FW | (France) | Ludovic Ajorque | 12 | 0 | 12 |
| 1 | 20 | FW | (Senegal) | Habib Diallo | 11 | 1 | 12 |
| 3 | 9 | FW | (France) | Kevin Gameiro | 11 | 0 | 11 |
| 4 | 10 | MF | (France) | Adrien Thomasson | 8 | 0 | 8 |
| 5 | 17 | MF | (France) | Jean-Ricner Bellegarde | 2 | 0 | 2 |
| 5 | 11 | MF | (France) | Dimitri Liénard | 2 | 0 | 2 |
| 5 | 27 | MF | (France) | Ibrahima Sissoko | 2 | 0 | 2 |
| 5 | 8 | FW | (Ghana) | Abdul Majeed Waris | 2 | 0 | 2 |
| 8 | 5 | DF | (France) | Lucas Perrin | 1 | 0 | 1 |
| 8 | 6 | DF | (Ivory Coast) | Jean-Eudes Aholou | 1 | 0 | 1 |
| 8 | 14 | MF | (Bosnia and Herzegovina) | Sanjin Prcić | 1 | 0 | 1 |
| 8 | 19 | MF | (France) | Anthony Caci | 1 | 0 | 1 |
| 8 | 23 | DF | (France) | Maxime Le Marchand | 1 | 0 | 1 |
| 8 | 24 | DF | (Ghana) | Alexander Djiku | 1 | 0 | 1 |
| Own goals | | | | | 4 | 0 | 4 |
| Totals | | | | | 60 | 1 | 61 |

Last updated: 21 May 2022
