= 2020–21 RC Strasbourg Alsace season =

Strasbourg
2020–21 season
- President: Marc Keller
- Head coach: Thierry Laurey
- Stadium: Stade de la Meinau
- Ligue 1: 15th
- Coupe de France: Round of 64
- Top goalscorer: League: Ludovic Ajorque (16); All: Ludovic Ajorque (16)
- Biggest win: Strasbourg 5–0 Nîmes
- Biggest defeat: Paris Saint-Germain 4–0 Strasbourg
Home colours	Away colours	Third colours

The 2020–21 RC Strasbourg Alsace season was the club's 115th season in existence and the fourth consecutive season in the top flight of French football. In addition to the domestic league, Strasbourg participated in this season's edition of the Coupe de France. The season covered the period from 1 July 2020 to 30 June 2021.

== Players ==
=== First-team squad ===
As of 1 February 2021

Note: Flags indicate national team as defined under FIFA eligibility rules; some limited exceptions apply. Players may hold more than one non-FIFA nationality.

No.	Pos.	Nation	Player
1	GK	BEL	Matz Sels
2	DF	FRA	Mohamed Simakan
4	DF	FRA	Frédéric Guilbert (on loan from Aston Villa)
5	DF	CIV	Lamine Koné (vice-captain)
6	MF	CIV	Jean-Eudes Aholou (on loan from Monaco)
7	MF	TUN	Moataz Zemzemi
8	FW	GHA	Abdul Majeed Waris
9	FW	ALG	Idriss Saadi
11	MF	FRA	Dimitri Liénard
12	FW	RSA	Lebo Mothiba
13	DF	SRB	Stefan Mitrović (captain)
14	MF	BIH	Sanjin Prcić
16	GK	JPN	Eiji Kawashima
17	MF	FRA	Jean-Ricner Bellegarde

No.	Pos.	Nation	Player
18	MF	FRA	Mahamé Siby
19	MF	FRA	Anthony Caci
20	FW	MLI	Kévin Zohi
21	MF	FRA	Mehdi Chahiri
23	DF	FRA	Lionel Carole
24	DF	GHA	Alexander Djiku
25	FW	FRA	Ludovic Ajorque
26	MF	FRA	Adrien Thomasson
27	MF	FRA	Ibrahima Sissoko
28	FW	SEN	Habib Diallo
29	DF	FRA	Ismaël Aaneba
30	GK	SEN	Bingourou Kamara
34	MF	FRA	Adrien Lebeau

=== Out on loan ===
Note: Flags indicate national team as defined under FIFA eligibility rules; some limited exceptions apply. Players may hold more than one non-FIFA nationality.

No.	Pos.	Nation	Player
—	DF	CMR	Duplexe Tchamba (on loan to Strømsgodset)

== Transfers ==
=== In ===
No.	Pos	Player	Transferred from	Fee	Date	Source
15			TBD		1 July 2020	

=== Out ===
No.	Pos	Player	Transferred to	Fee	Date	Source
15			TBD		1 July 2020	

== Pre-season and friendlies ==
Win Draw Loss

24 July 2020 Friendly	Strasbourg	1–0	Nîmes	Évian-les-Bains, France
17:00 CEST (UTC+2)	Mothiba 88' (pen.)	Report		Stadium: Stade Camille-Fournier

28 July 2020 Friendly	Strasbourg	2–1	Montpellier	Divonne-les-Bains, France
17:00 CEST (UTC+2)	Ajorque 31' (pen.); Saadi 71'	Report	Mollet 15'	Stadium: Complexe sportif de Divonne-les-Bains

1 August 2020 Friendly	Haguenau	Cancelled	Strasbourg	Tomblaine, France
17:00 CEST (UTC+2)				Stadium: Stade Marcel Picot

1 August 2020 Friendly	Nancy	Cancelled	Strasbourg	Tomblaine, France
18:00 CEST (UTC+2)				Stadium: Stade Marcel Picot

4 August 2020 Friendly	Dijon	Cancelled	Strasbourg	Dijon, France
18:00 CEST (UTC+2)				Stadium: Stade Gaston Gérard
Note: The match was cancelled after several Strasbourg players tested positive for COVID-19.

8 August 2020 Friendly	Reims	Cancelled	Strasbourg	Reims, France
18:00 CEST (UTC+2)				Stadium: Stade Auguste-Delaune

15 August 2020 Friendly	Strasbourg	2–3	Metz	Molsheim, France
17:00 CEST (UTC+2)	Saadi 58'; Besic 87'	Report	Niane 21', 35'; Boulaya 40'; Pajot (red card) 44'	Stadium: Stadium de Molsheim

15 August 2020 Friendly	Strasbourg	Cancelled	Metz	Colmar, France
18:00 CEST (UTC+2)				Stadium: Colmar Stadium

5 September 2020 Friendly	VfB Stuttgart	4–2	Strasbourg	Stuttgart, Germany
16:30 CEST (UTC+2)	González 10' (pen.); Didavi 37'; Endo 52'; Kalajdžić 55'	Report	Ajorque 8'; Thomasson 14'	Stadium: Robert-Schlienz-Stadion; Attendance: 0 Referee: Marco Fritz

9 October 2020 Friendly	FC Aarau	0–2	Strasbourg	Aarau, Switzerland
16:00 CEST (UTC+2)		Report	Prcić 42'; Aaneba 83'	Stadium: Stadion Brügglifeld; Attendance: 0

== Competitions ==
=== Overview ===
Competition	First match	Last match	Starting round	Final position	Record							
Competition	First match	Last match	Starting round	Final position	Pld	W	D	L	GF	GA	GD	Win %
Ligue 1	23 August 2020	23 May 2021	Matchday 1	15th	38	11	9	18	49	58	−9	28.95
Coupe de France	10 February 2021		Round of 64	Round of 64	1	0	0	1	0	2	−2	0.00
Total					39	11	9	19	49	60	−11	28.21

Last updated: 23 May 2021
Source: Soccerway

=== Ligue 1 ===
==== League table ====
Pos	Team	Pld	W	D	L	GF	GA	GD	Pts
13	Angers	38	12	8	18	40	58	−18	44
14	Reims	38	9	15	14	42	50	−8	42
15	Strasbourg	38	11	9	18	49	58	−9	42
16	Lorient	38	11	9	18	50	68	−18	42
17	Brest	38	11	8	19	50	66	−16	41

Source: Ligue 1
Rules for classification: 1) Points; 2) Goal difference; 3) Goals scored; 4) Head-to-head goal difference; 5) Fairplay ranking.

==== Results summary ====
Overall								Home						Away					
Pld	W	D	L	GF	GA	GD	Pts	W	D	L	GF	GA	GD	W	D	L	GF	GA	GD
38	11	9	18	49	58	−9	42	4	5	10	21	29	−8	7	4	8	28	29	−1

Last updated: 23 May 2021.
Source: Ligue 1

==== Results by round ====
Round	1	2	3	4	5	6	7	8	9	10	11	12	13	14	15	16	17	18	19	20	21	22	23	24	25	26	27	28	29	30	31	32	33	34	35	36	37	38
Ground	A	H	A	H	A	H	H	A	A	H	A	H	A	H	A	H	A	H	A	H	A	H	H	A	A	H	A	H	A	H	A	H	A	H	A	H	A	H
Result	L	L	L	W	L	L	L	W	L	L	L	D	W	D	W	L	L	W	W	W	D	L	D	L	W	D	D	W	L	L	W	L	D	L	D	L	W	D
Position	19	18	20	18	18	18	18	18	19	19	19	19	17	16	15	16	17	16	15	13	15	15	15	16	16	15	15	14	15	15	13	14	14	15	16	16	15	15

Source: Ligue 1
A = Away; H = Home; W = Win; D = Draw; L = Loss

==== Matches ====
The league fixtures were announced on 9 July 2020.

23 August 2020 1	Lorient	3–1	Strasbourg	Lorient
15:00 CEST (UTC+2)	Wissa 51'; Grbić 60' (pen.); Boisgard (yellow card) 69'; Wadja (yellow card) 72'; Laporte (yellow card) 79'; Hamel 87'	Report	Chahiri 30'; Simakan (yellow card) 37'; Carole (yellow card) 82'	Stadium: Stade du Moustoir; Referee: Johan Hamel

29 August 2020 2	Strasbourg	0–2	Nice	Strasbourg
21:00 CEST (UTC+2)	Koné (yellow card) 36'; Djiku (yellow card) 73'	Report	Lotomba (yellow card) 13'; Schneiderlin (yellow card) 17'; Dante (yellow card) 24'; Sylvestre (yellow card) 27'; Dolberg 37' (pen.), 59', (yellow card) 45+2'; Lees-Melou (yellow card) 42'	Stadium: Stade de la Meinau; Referee: Jérôme Brisard

12 September 2020 3	Saint-Étienne	2–0	Strasbourg	Saint-Étienne
21:00 CEST (UTC+2)	Neyou (yellow card) 45+1'; Bouanga 57' (pen.); Camara 82'	Report	Bellegarde (yellow card) 7'; Sissoko (yellow card) 39'; Djiku (yellow card) 56'	Stadium: Stade Geoffroy-Guichard; Referee: Eric Wattellier

20 September 2020 4	Strasbourg	1–0	Dijon	Strasbourg
15:00 CEST (UTC+2)	Ajorque (yellow card) 13'; Mitrović 80'	Report	Sammaritano (yellow card) 33'	Stadium: Stade de la Meinau; Referee: Florent Batta

27 September 2020 5	Monaco	3–2	Strasbourg	Monaco
15:00 CEST (UTC+2)	Ben Yedder 9', 53'; Tchouaméni (yellow card) 21' (yellow-red card) 55'; Ballo-Touré (yellow card) 40'; Aguilar 45+1'; Disasi (red card) 67'	Report	Chahiri 46'; Thomasson (yellow card) 60'; Ajorque 70' (pen.)	Stadium: Stade Louis II; Referee: Jérémie Pignard

4 October 2020 6	Strasbourg	0–3	Lille	Strasbourg
15:00 CEST (UTC+2)	Djiku (yellow card) 42'	Report	Çelik 21'; Sanches 53'; Luiz Araújo (yellow card) 59'; Yılmaz 68'	Stadium: Stade de la Meinau; Referee: Mikael Lesage

18 October 2020 7	Strasbourg	2–3	Lyon	Strasbourg
13:00 CEST (UTC+2)	Diallo 44'; Aholou 55', (yellow card) 90+2'; Ajorque (yellow card) 57'	Report	Kadewere 12', (yellow card) 20'; Toko Ekambi 25', 42', (yellow card) 52'; Cornet (yellow card) 45+1'	Stadium: Stade de la Meinau; Referee: Ruddy Buquet

25 October 2020 8	Brest	0–3	Strasbourg	Brest
15:00 CET (UTC+1)	Charbonnier (yellow card) 42'	Report	Ajorque (yellow card) 21', (goal) 67'; Diallo 26'; Lala 40' (pen.); Mitrović (yellow card) 41'; Aholou (yellow card) 80'	Stadium: Stade Francis-Le Blé; Referee: Jérôme Miguelgorry

1 November 2020 9	Reims	2–1	Strasbourg	Reims
15:00 CET (UTC+1)	Kamara 22' (o.g.); Faes 26'	Report	Diallo (yellow card) 3'; Ajorque 30' (pen.); Prcić (yellow card) 73'	Stadium: Stade Auguste-Delaune; Attendance: 0 Referee: Eric Wattellier

6 November 2020 10	Strasbourg	0–1	Marseille	Strasbourg
21:00 CET (UTC+1)		Report	Amavi (yellow card) 52'; Kamara (yellow card) 58'; Sanson 72'; Khaoui (yellow card) 87'; Mandanda (yellow card) 89'	Stadium: Stade de la Meinau; Attendance: 0 Referee: Johan Hamel

22 November 2020 11	Montpellier	4–3	Strasbourg	Montpellier
15:00 CET (UTC+1)	Mendes 8', (yellow card) 25'; Delort 13', 31'; Congré (yellow card) 54'; Laborde 68'	Report	Lala 22' (pen.); Diallo 26' (pen.); Ajorque 45'; Aholou (yellow card) 49'	Stadium: Stade de la Mosson; Attendance: 0 Referee: Jérôme Brisard

27 November 2020 12	Strasbourg	1–1	Rennes	Strasbourg
21:00 CET (UTC+1)	Thomasson 24'; Mitrović (red card) 40'	Report	Hunou 61'	Stadium: Stade de la Meinau; Attendance: 0 Referee: Benoît Millot

6 December 2020 13	Nantes	0–4	Strasbourg	Nantes
15:00 CET (UTC+1)	Abeid (yellow card) 64'; Louza (yellow card) 67'; Corchia (yellow card) 77'	Report	Liénard 16' (pen.), (yellow card) 32'; Diallo 34'; Lala (yellow card) 62'; Ajorque 78' (pen.); Zohi 83'	Stadium: Stade de la Beaujoire; Attendance: 0 Referee: Clément Turpin

13 December 2020 14	Strasbourg	2–2	Metz	Strasbourg
15:00 CET (UTC+1)	Simakan (yellow card) 36', (goal) 66'; Thomasson 78', (yellow card) 84'; Aholou (yellow card) 90+4'	Report	Bronn 35' (pen.), (penalty missed) 51'; Nguette 70'; Delaine (yellow card) 73'; Maïga (yellow card) 80'; Kouyaté (yellow card) 90'; Angban (yellow card) 90'	Stadium: Stade de la Meinau; Attendance: 0 Referee: François Letexier

16 December 2020 15	Angers	0–2	Strasbourg	Angers
19:00 CET (UTC+1)	Doumbia (yellow card) 73'	Report	Djiku (yellow card) 12'; Diallo 77'; Ajorque 90+1', (yellow card) 90+5'	Stadium: Stade Raymond Kopa; Attendance: 0 Referee: Bastien Dechepy

20 December 2020 16	Strasbourg	0–2	Bordeaux	Strasbourg
15:00 CET (UTC+1)	Djiku (yellow card) 4'; Sissoko (yellow card) 81'	Report	Pablo (yellow card) 2', (goal) 38'; Otávio 66'	Stadium: Stade de la Meinau; Attendance: 0 Referee: Benoît Bastien

23 December 2020 17	Paris Saint-Germain	4–0	Strasbourg	Paris
21:00 CET (UTC+1)	Pembélé 18'; Mbappé 80'; Gueye 88'; Kean 90+1'	Report		Stadium: Parc des Princes; Attendance: 0 Referee: Jérôme Miguelgorry

6 January 2021 18	Strasbourg	5–0	Nîmes	Strasbourg
19:00 CET (UTC+1)	Aholou (yellow card) 8'; Ajorque 36', 51', (penalty missed) 58'; Diallo 38'; Lala 45+1' (pen.); Waris 90' (pen.)	Report	Deaux (yellow card) 57'; Fomba (yellow card) 89'	Stadium: Stade de la Meinau; Attendance: 0 Referee: Benoît Millot

9 January 2021 19	Lens	0–1	Strasbourg	Lens
21:00 CET (UTC+1)	Cahuzac (yellow card) 50'	Report	Diallo 21'; Bellegarde (yellow card) 50'	Stadium: Stade Bollaert-Delelis; Attendance: 0 Referee: Clément Turpin

17 January 2021 20	Strasbourg	1–0	Saint-Étienne	Strasbourg
15:00 CET (UTC+1)	Ajorque 29'; Sissoko (yellow card) 36'; Aholou (yellow card) 51'	Report	Boudebouz (penalty missed) 10'; Gabard (yellow card) 12'; Gourna-Douath (yellow card) 56'	Stadium: Stade de la Meinau; Attendance: 0 Referee: Antony Gautier

24 January 2021 21	Dijon	1–1	Strasbourg	Dijon
15:00 CET (UTC+1)	Muzinga (yellow card) 54'; Coulibaly 63'	Report	Ajorque 51'	Stadium: Stade Gaston Gérard; Attendance: 0 Referee: Jérôme Brisard

31 January 2021 22	Strasbourg	0–1	Reims	Strasbourg
15:00 CET (UTC+1)	Djiku (yellow card) 64'	Report	Faes (yellow card) 38'; Kutesa 80'; Chavalerin (yellow card) 85'	Stadium: Stade de la Meinau; Attendance: 0 Referee: Stéphanie Frappart

3 February 2021 23	Strasbourg	2–2	Brest	Strasbourg
19:00 CET (UTC+1)	Thomasson 8'; Mitrović (yellow card) 48'; Aholou 70'; Kawashima (yellow card) 87'	Report	Charbonnier 83'; Le Douaron 90+3'	Stadium: Stade de la Meinau; Attendance: 0 Referee: Florent Batta

6 February 2021 24	Lyon	3–0	Strasbourg	Décines-Charpieu
19:00 CET (UTC+1)	Depay 20', 68'; Toko Ekambi 30'; Marcelo (yellow card) 41'; Diomandé (yellow card) 61'	Report	Thomasson (yellow card) 14' (yellow-red card) 14'	Stadium: Parc Olympique Lyonnais; Attendance: 0 Referee: Amaury Delerue

14 February 2021 25	Metz	1–2	Strasbourg	Metz
15:00 CET (UTC+1)	Delaine 17', (yellow card) 26'; Kouyaté (yellow card) 44'	Report	Thomasson 33', 84'; Sissoko (yellow card) 42'	Stadium: Stade Saint-Symphorien; Attendance: 0 Referee: Mikael Lesage

21 February 2021 26	Strasbourg	0–0	Angers	Strasbourg
15:00 CET (UTC+1)	Sissoko (yellow card) 45+2'; Mitrović (yellow card) 58'	Report	Diony (yellow card) 76'	Stadium: Stade de la Meinau; Attendance: 0 Referee: Hakim Ben El Hadj

28 February 2021 27	Lille	1–1	Strasbourg	Villeneuve-d'Ascq
17:05 CET (UTC+1)	Fonte 86'	Report	Ajorque 36'; Guilbert (yellow card) 44'; Aholou (yellow card) 90'	Stadium: Stade Pierre-Mauroy; Attendance: 0 Referee: Jérôme Brisard

3 March 2021 28	Strasbourg	1–0	Monaco	Strasbourg
21:00 CET (UTC+1)	Liénard (yellow card) 19'; Ajorque (yellow card) 27'; Thomasson (yellow card) 53'; Guilbert 90+1'	Report		Stadium: Stade de la Meinau; Attendance: 0 Referee: Eric Wattellier

14 March 2021 29	Rennes	1–0	Strasbourg	Rennes
15:00 CET (UTC+1)	Bourigeaud 25'	Report	Koné (yellow card) 22'; Bellegarde (yellow card) 31'	Stadium: Roazhon Park; Attendance: 0 Referee: Bastien Dechepy

21 March 2021 30	Strasbourg	1–2	Lens	Strasbourg
13:00 CET (UTC+1)	Bellegarde 20'; Thomasson (yellow card) 42'; Sissoko (yellow card) 44'	Report	Haïdara 5'; Badé (yellow card) 19'; Fofana 40'; Medina (yellow card) 44'; Doucouré (yellow card) 86'; Jean (yellow card) 90'; Leca (yellow card) 90+4'	Stadium: Stade de la Meinau; Attendance: 0 Referee: Jérémy Stinat

4 April 2021 31	Bordeaux	2–3	Strasbourg	Bordeaux
15:00 CEST (UTC+2)	Mexer (yellow card) 29'; Baysse 36'; Hwang 45+1' (pen.)	Report	Koné 6'; Diallo 21'; Ajorque 30' (pen.); Guilbert (yellow card) 57'	Stadium: Matmut Atlantique; Attendance: 0 Referee: Jérôme Brisard

10 April 2021 32	Strasbourg	1–4	Paris Saint-Germain	Strasbourg
17:00 CEST (UTC+2)	Sahi 63'	Report	Mbappé 16'; Sarabia 27'; Kean 45', (yellow card) 56'; Paredes 79'	Stadium: Stade de la Meinau; Attendance: 0 Referee: Jérémie Pignard

18 April 2021 33	Nîmes	1–1	Strasbourg	Nîmes
15:00 CEST (UTC+2)	Ripart 55' (pen.)	Report	Aholou (yellow card) 29'; Guilbert (red card) 47'; Thomasson (yellow card) 61'; Liénard (penalty missed) 82', 82'	Stadium: Stade des Costières; Attendance: 0 Referee: Antony Gautier

25 April 2021 34	Strasbourg	1–2	Nantes	Strasbourg
15:00 CEST (UTC+2)	Djiku (yellow card) 17'; Ajorque 43'	Report	Chirivella (yellow card) 16'; Louza (yellow card) 22'; Castelletto 53', (yellow card) 57'; Blas 76'	Stadium: Stade de la Meinau; Attendance: 0 Referee: Ruddy Buquet

30 April 2021 35	Marseille	1–1	Strasbourg	Marseille
21:00 CEST (UTC+2)	Rongier (yellow card) 55'; Lirola (yellow card) 81'; Benedetto 86'; Milik (yellow card) 90+2'; Gueye (yellow card) 90+3'	Report	Koné (yellow card) 53'; Mitrović 73'; Diallo (yellow card) 85'	Stadium: Stade Vélodrome; Attendance: 0 Referee: Stéphanie Frappart

9 May 2021 36	Strasbourg	2–3	Montpellier	Strasbourg
15:00 CEST (UTC+2)	Aholou (yellow card) 37'; Ajorque 69'; Djiku (yellow card) 90+1'; Zohi 90+4'	Report	Laborde 36', 49'; Le Tallec (yellow card) 43'; Delort 46'; Chotard (yellow card) 61'; Ristić (yellow card) 90+5'	Stadium: Stade de la Meinau; Attendance: 0 Referee: Jérôme Miguelgorry

16 May 2021 37	Nice	0–2	Strasbourg	Nice
21:00 CEST (UTC+2)	Saliba (yellow card) 26'; Boudaoui (yellow card) 58'	Report	Ajorque 2', 66'; Thomasson (yellow card) 38'	Stadium: Allianz Riviera; Attendance: 0 Referee: Mikael Lesage

23 May 2021 38	Strasbourg	1–1	Lorient	Strasbourg
21:00 CEST (UTC+2)	Carole (yellow card) 10'; Diallo 18'	Report	Laporte (yellow card) 53'; Chalobah 55'	Stadium: Stade de la Meinau; Attendance: 0 Referee: Stéphanie Frappart

=== Coupe de France ===
10 February 2021 Round of 64	Strasbourg	0–2	Montpellier	Strasbourg
14:45 CET (UTC+1)		Report	Delort 45+1'; Škuletić 88'	Stadium: Stade de la Meinau; Attendance: 0 Referee: Ruddy Buquet

== Statistics ==
=== Goalscorers ===
Rank	No.	Pos.	Player	Ligue 1	Coupe de France	Total
1	25	FW	(France) Ludovic Ajorque	16	0	16
2	28	FW	(Senegal) Habib Diallo	9	0	9
3	26	MF	(France) Adrien Thomasson	5	0	5
4	10	DF	(France) Kenny Lala	3	0	3
5	6	MF	(Ivory Coast) Jean-Eudes Aholou	2	0	2
5	11	MF	(France) Dimitri Liénard	2	0	2
5	13	DF	(Serbia) Stefan Mitrović	2	0	2
5	20	MF	(Mali) Kévin Zohi	2	0	2
5	21	MF	(France) Mehdi Chahiri	2	0	2
10	2	DF	(France) Mohamed Simakan	1	0	1
10	4	DF	(France) Frédéric Guilbert	1	0	1
10	5	DF	(Ivory Coast) Lamine Koné	1	0	1
10	8	FW	(Ghana) Majeed Waris	1	0	1
10	17	MF	(France) Jean-Ricner Bellegarde	1	0	1
10	31	FW	(Ivory Coast) Moïse Dion Sahi	1	0	1
Totals				49	0	49
