= Karol Fila =

Polish footballer

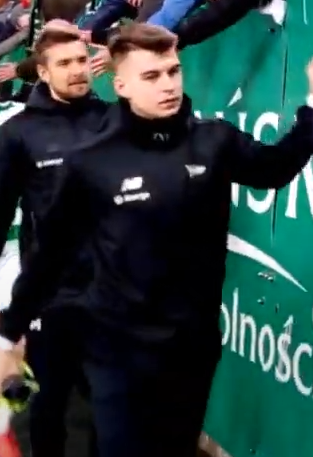
- Fila in 2018 with Lechia Gdańsk

Personal information
- Full name: Karol Janusz Fila
- Date of birth: 13 June 1998 (age 28)
- Place of birth: Gdańsk, Poland
- Height: 1.82 m (6 ft 0 in)
- Position: Right-back

Team information
- Current team: Wieczysta Kraków
- Number: 4

Youth career
- Żuławy Nowy Dwór Gdański
- 2011–2014: AP Lechia Gdańsk
- 2014–2017: Lechia Gdańsk

Senior career*
Years	Team	Apps	(Gls)
2014–2018	Lechia Gdańsk II	11	(0)
2017–2021	Lechia Gdańsk	87	(3)
2017–2018	→ Chojniczanka (loan)	15	(0)
2021–2024	Strasbourg	19	(0)
2023	→ Zulte Waregem (loan)	11	(1)
2024–2025	Dender	5	(1)
2025–	Wieczysta Kraków	23	(2)

International career
2020–2021	Poland U21	13	(1)
- * Club domestic league appearances and goals as of 21:28, 31 May 2026 (UTC)

Karol Janusz Fila (born 13 June 1998) is a Polish professional footballer who plays as a right-back for Ekstraklasa club Wieczysta Kraków.

== Career statistics ==
As of match played 31 May 2026

Appearances and goals by club, season and competition
Club	Season	League			National cup (Note: Includes Polish Cup, Coupe de France, Belgian Cup)		Europe		Other		Total	
Club	Season	Division	Apps	Goals	Apps	Goals	Apps	Goals	Apps	Goals	Apps	Goals
Lechia Gdańsk	2016–17	Ekstraklasa	0	0	0	0	—		—		0	0
Lechia Gdańsk	2017–18	Ekstraklasa	1	0	1	0	—		—		2	0
Lechia Gdańsk	2018–19	Ekstraklasa	29	2	3	0	—		—		32	2
Lechia Gdańsk	2019–20	Ekstraklasa	31	0	0	0	2 (Note: Appearances in UEFA Europa League)	0	1 (Note: Appearance in Polish Super Cup)	0	34	0
Lechia Gdańsk	2020–21	Ekstraklasa	26	1	3	1	—		—		29	2
Lechia Gdańsk	Total		87	3	7	1	2	0	1	0	97	4
Chojniczanka Chojnice (loan)	2017–18	I liga	15	0	0	0	—		—		15	0
Strasbourg	2021–22	Ligue 1	16	0	1	0	—		—		17	0
Strasbourg	2022–23	Ligue 1	2	0	0	0	—		—		2	0
Strasbourg	2023–24	Ligue 1	0	0	0	0	—		—		0	0
Strasbourg	2024–25	Ligue 1	1	0	0	0	—		—		1	0
Strasbourg	Total		19	0	1	0	—		—		20	0
Zulte Waregem (loan)	2022–23	Belgian Pro League	11	1	2	0	—		—		13	1
Strasbourg II	2023–24	Champ. Nat. 3	3	0	—		—		—		3	0
Dender	2024–25	Belgian Pro League	5	1	0	0	—		—		5	1
Wieczysta Kraków	2025–26	I liga	21	2	0	0	—		2 (Note: Appearances in I liga promotion play-offs)	0	23	2
Career total			161	7	10	1	2	0	3	0	176	8

== Honours ==
Lechia Gdańsk

- Polish Cup: 2018–19
- Polish Super Cup: 2019
