= Frédéric Guilbert =

French footballer (born 1994)

Personal information
- Full name: Frédéric Georges Claude Auguste Guilbert
- Date of birth: 24 December 1994 (age 31)
- Place of birth: Valognes, Manche, France
- Height: 1.78 m (5 ft 10 in)
- Position: Right-back

Team information
- Current team: Nantes
- Number: 24

Youth career
- 2000–2008: AS Valognes
- 2008–2012: Caen

Senior career*
Years	Team	Apps	(Gls)
2012–2013	Caen II	2	(0)
2013–2014	AS Cherbourg	28	(1)
2014–2016	Bordeaux II	21	(0)
2015–2017	Bordeaux	36	(0)
2016–2017	→ Caen (loan)	23	(0)
2017–2019	Caen	55	(1)
2019–2023	Aston Villa	25	(0)
2019	→ Caen (loan)	15	(1)
2021–2022	→ Strasbourg (loan)	46	(1)
2023–2024	Strasbourg	50	(2)
2024–2026	Lecce	31	(0)
2026–	Nantes	7	(0)

International career
2015	France U21	1	(0)
- * Club domestic league appearances and goals as of 2 May 2026

Frédéric Georges Claude Auguste Guilbert (French pronunciation: [fʁedeʁik ɡilbɛʁ]; born 24 December 1994) is a French professional footballer who plays as a right-back for Ligue 2 club Nantes.

A product of the Caen youth system, he has played mainly in France for AS Cherbourg, Bordeaux and Strasbourg, as well as a spell with English side Aston Villa and Italian club Lecce.

He has a single cap for the France U21 national team.

== Club career ==
=== Bordeaux ===
Guilbert joined Bordeaux in 2014 from Cherbourg. He made his Ligue 1 debut on 5 April 2015 in a 2–1 home win against Lens replacing Thomas Touré after 79 minutes.

=== SM Caen ===
On 28 July 2017, Guilbert transferred to Caen after completing a loan spell during the 2016–17 season.

Guilbert was known for being a proficient and hard tackler with an average of 3.1 clearances and 2.9 tackles per game respectively throughout his final season with the club. He finished his time with Caen having amassed 106 appearances over three seasons.

=== Aston Villa ===
On 31 January 2019, Guilbert signed for Aston Villa for an undisclosed fee, but would remain at Caen on loan until the end of the season. He scored his first goal for Villa in an EFL Cup tie against Crewe Alexandra on 27 August 2019. He would go onto score his second goal for Aston Villa in the EFL Cup semi-final match against Leicester City on 8 January 2020.

Guilbert's Villa career started positively, described by Paul Doyle in The Guardian as "solid defensively and a regular threat going forward." However, following a knee injury and then the subsequent arrival of Matty Cash in September 2020, Guilbert's appearances for the club were limited.

==== Strasbourg (loan) ====
On 31 January 2021, Guilbert returned to France, signing for Ligue 1 side Strasbourg on loan for the rest of the season. Guilbert made his Strasbourg debut on 10 February 2021 in a 2–0 home defeat to Montpellier in the Coupe de France. On 3 March 2021, Guilbert scored his first goal for Strasbourg, a late winner in a 1–0 home victory over Monaco in Ligue 1. After returning to Villa from his loan spell for pre-season, on 31 August 2021, Guilbert returned to Strasbourg on loan for the 2021–22 season.

Guilbert stayed at Villa following the summer transfer window of 2022. In September 2022, Aston Villa submitted their 25-player Premier League squad for the 2022–23 season, in which Guilbert was selected, despite rumours in a local newspaper that he had been instructed to train with the under-21s rather than the senior squad.

=== Strasbourg ===
On 17 January 2023, after not having made a senior competitive appearance for Aston Villa since August 2021, Guilbert signed for Strasbourg on a permanent transfer for an undisclosed fee. Guilbert himself stated that it was a free transfer, with his Villa contract being terminated by mutual consent.

=== Lecce ===
On 27 August 2024, Lecce announced that they had signed Guilbert to a two-year contract on a free transfer from Strasbourg, with an option for a third year. Guilbert was Lecce's starting right-back in the 2024–25 season, but was not included in Lecce's 2025–26 Serie A squad as Danilo Veiga took over the spot. On 23 January 2026, the contract was terminated by mutual consent.

=== Nantes ===
On 28 January 2026, Guilbert signed with Nantes until the end of the 2025–26 season.

== Career statistics ==
As of match played 2 May 2026

Appearances and goals by club, season and competition
Club	Season	League			National cup		League cup		Continental		Other		Total	
Club	Season	Division	Apps	Goals	Apps	Goals	Apps	Goals	Apps	Goals	Apps	Goals	Apps	Goals
Caen II	2011–12	CFA	1	0	0	0	—		—		—		1	0
Caen II	2012–13	CFA	1	0	0	0	—		—		—		1	0
Caen II	Total		2	0	0	0	0	0	0	0	0	0	2	0
AS Cherbourg	2013–14	CFA	28	0	1	0	—		—		—		29	0
Bordeaux	2014–15	Ligue 1	3	0	0	0	0	0	—		—		3	0
Bordeaux	2015–16	Ligue 1	30	0	1	0	3	0	6	0	—		40	0
Bordeaux	2016–17	Ligue 1	3	0	0	0	0	0	—		—		3	0
Bordeaux	Total		36	0	1	0	3	0	6	0	0	0	46	0
Caen	2017–18	Ligue 1	36	1	4	0	2	0	—		—		42	1
Caen	2018–19	Ligue 1	34	1	3	0	1	0	—		—		38	1
Caen	Total		93	2	9	0	4	0	0	0	0	0	106	2
Aston Villa	2019–20	Premier League	25	0	0	0	4	2	—		—		29	2
Aston Villa	2020–21	Premier League	0	0	0	0	2	0	—		—		2	0
Aston Villa	2021–22	Premier League	0	0	0	0	1	1	—		—		1	1
Aston Villa	Total		25	0	0	0	7	3	0	0	0	0	32	3
Caen (loan)	2016–17	Ligue 1	23	0	2	0	1	0	—		—		26	0
Strasbourg (loan)	2020–21	Ligue 1	13	1	1	0	—		—		0	0	14	1
Strasbourg (loan)	2021–22	Ligue 1	18	0	0	0	—		—		0	0	18	0
Strasbourg (loan)	Total		31	1	1	0	0	0	0	0	0	0	32	1
Strasbourg	2022–23	Ligue 1	18	0	0	0	—		—		—		18	0
Strasbourg	2023–24	Ligue 1	32	2	4	0	—		—		—		36	2
Strasbourg	Total		50	2	4	0	0	0	0	0	0	0	54	2
Lecce	2024–25	Serie A	31	0	1	0	—		—		—		32	0
Nantes	2025–26	Ligue 1	7	0	—		—		—		—		7	0
Career total			303	5	17	0	14	3	6	0	0	0	335	8

== Honours ==
Aston Villa

- EFL Cup runner-up: 2019–20
