= Nordine Kandil =

Footballer (born 2001)

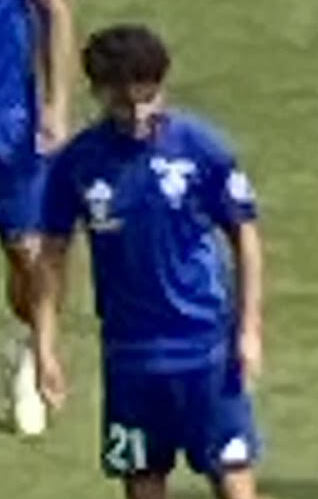
- Kandil with Strasbourg in 2024

Personal information
- Date of birth: 31 October 2001 (age 25)
- Place of birth: Strasbourg, France
- Height: 1.65 m (5 ft 5 in)
- Position: Midfielder

Team information
- Current team: Nancy
- Number: 70

Youth career
- 2006–2021: Strasbourg

Senior career*
Years	Team	Apps	(Gls)
2018–2023	Strasbourg B	19	(2)
2021–2024	Strasbourg	13	(0)
2023–2024	→ Annecy (loan)	36	(4)
2024–2026	Amiens	41	(7)
2026–	Nancy	3	(0)

International career^{‡}
2023	Morocco U23	2	(0)
- * Club domestic league appearances and goals as of 28 August 2026 ‡ National team caps and goals as of 15 August 2023

Nordine Kandil (born 31 October 2001) is a professional footballer who plays as a midfielder for Ligue 2 club Nancy. Born in France, he represents Morocco at youth level.

== Club career ==
A youth product of Strasbourg since the age of 5, Kandil signed his first professional contract with the club on 14 May 2021. He made his professional debut with Strasbourg in a 5–1 Ligue 1 win over Saint-Étienne on 17 October 2021, coming on as a late sub in the 81st minute and assisting his side's 5th goal.

On 9 August 2023, Kandil joined Ligue 2 club Annecy on a season-long loan.

== International career ==
Born in France, Kandil holds French and Moroccan nationalities. He was called up to the Morocco U23s in March 2023.

== Career statistics ==
As of match played 18 August 2024

Appearances and goals by club, season and competition
Club	Season	League			National cup		Europe		Other		Total	
Club	Season	Division	Apps	Goals	Apps	Goals	Apps	Goals	Apps	Goals	Apps	Goals
Strasbourg B	2018–19	Championnat National 3	4	0	—		—		—		4	0
Strasbourg B	2019–20	Championnat National 3	6	0	—		—		—		6	0
Strasbourg B	2020–21	Championnat National 3	3	0	—		—		—		3	0
Strasbourg B	2021–22	Championnat National 3	4	1	—		—		—		4	1
Strasbourg B	2022–23	Championnat National 3	2	1	—		—		—		2	1
Strasbourg B	Total		19	2	—		—		—		19	2
Strasbourg	2021–22	Ligue 1	5	0	0	0	—		—		5	0
Strasbourg	2022–23	Ligue 1	7	0	0	0	—		—		7	0
Strasbourg	2024–25	Ligue 1	1	0	0	0	—		—		1	0
Strasbourg	Total		13	0	0	0	—		—		13	0
Annecy (loan)	2023–24	Ligue 2	36	4	2	0	—		—		38	4
Career total			68	6	2	0	0	0	0	0	70	6
