= 2007 Toulon Tournament =

Association football tournament

Tournament details
- Host country: France
- Dates: 31 May–9 June
- Teams: 8 (from 3 confederations)

Final positions
- Champions: France
- Runners-up: China
- Third place: Ivory Coast
- Fourth place: Portugal

The 2007 Toulon Tournament was the 35th edition of the Toulon Tournament, and was held from 31 May to 9 June. It was won by France, after they beat China 3–1 in the final.

== Results ==
=== Group A ===
Pos	Team	Pld	W	D	L	GF	GA	GD	Pts	Qualification
1	France	3	3	0	0	11	2	+9	9	Advance to Semi-final
2	Ivory Coast	3	1	1	1	1	2	−1	4	Advance to Semi-final
3	Japan	3	1	0	2	3	7	−4	3	
4	Germany	3	0	1	2	2	6	−4	1	

Source: RSSF

==== Match summaries ====
31 May 2007

France	2–0	Ivory Coast
Gameiro 26'; Rémy 65'

Stade Mayol, Toulon

31 May 2007

Japan	2–1	Germany
Morishima 58', 59'		Ebert 22'

Stade Mayol, Toulon

2 June 2007

Ivory Coast	0–0	Germany

Stade Perruc, Hyères

2 June 2007

France	5–1	Japan
Chakouri 18'; Louvion 56'; Boukari 60'; Rémy 66'; Faty 76'		Havenaar 44'

Stade Perruc, Hyères
4 June 2007

Ivory Coast	1–0	Japan
Tanoh 58'

Stade Vitria, La Londe-les-Maures

4 June 2007

France	4–1	Germany
Abdoun 5'; Pentecôte 31', 42', 58'

Stade Vitria, La Londe-les-Maures

=== Group B ===
Pos	Team	Pld	W	D	L	GF	GA	GD	Pts	Qualification
1	China	3	2	1	0	5	3	+2	7	Advance to Semi-final
2	Portugal	3	1	2	0	2	1	+1	5	Advance to Semi-final
3	Netherlands	3	0	2	1	2	3	−1	2	
4	Ghana	3	0	1	2	2	4	−2	1	

Source: RSSF

==== Match summaries ====
1 June 2007

China	1–1	Portugal
Chen Tao 65'		Gama 70'

Stade Mayol, Toulon

1 June 2007

Netherlands	1–1	Ghana
Luijckx 80'		Bekoe 19'

Stade Mayol, Toulon

3 June 2007

Portugal	1–0	Ghana
Gama

Stade Marquet, La Seyne-sur-Mer

3 June 2007

China	2–1	Netherlands
Jiang Ning		Agustien

Stade Marquet, La Seyne-sur-Mer

5 June 2007

Portugal	0–0	Netherlands

Stade Saulnier, Saint-Cyr-sur-Mer

5 June 2007

China	2–1	Ghana
Chen Tao 44'; Jiang Ning 65'		Clottey 9'

Stade Maurat, Solliès-Pont

=== Semi-finals ===
7 June 2007

France	1–0	Portugal
Gameiro 28'

Stade Mayol, Toulon

7 June 2007

China	0–0	Ivory Coast
Penalties
	5–3

Stade Mayol, Toulon

=== Third-place playoff ===
9 June 2007

Ivory Coast	0–0	Portugal
Penalties
	5–4

Stade Mayol, Toulon

=== Final ===
9 June 2007

France	3–1	China
Gameiro 13', 25', 46'		Yu Hai 75'

Stade Mayol, Toulon

2008 Toulon Tournament

France
Eleventh title
