= Jean-Ricner Bellegarde =

Haitian footballer (born 1998)

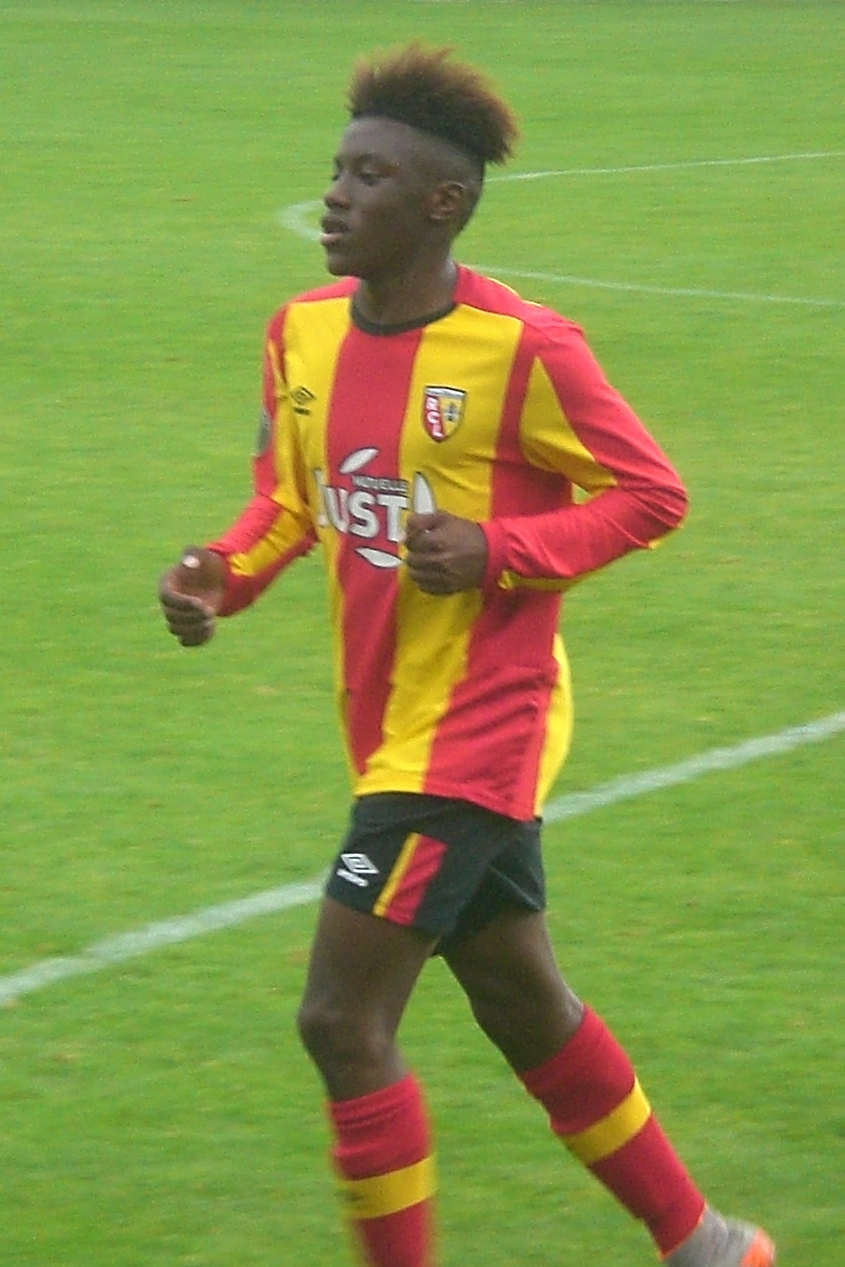
- Bellegarde playing for Lens B in 2015

Personal information
- Full name: Jean-Ricner Bellegarde
- Date of birth: 27 June 1998 (age 28)
- Place of birth: Colombes, France
- Height: 1.70 m (5 ft 7 in)
- Position: Midfielder

Team information
- Current team: Wolverhampton Wanderers
- Number: 27

Youth career
- 2009–2012: Villetaneuse CS
- 2012–2013: Le Mans
- 2013–2016: Lens

Senior career*
Years	Team	Apps	(Gls)
2015–2019	Lens B	38	(0)
2016–2019	Lens	55	(5)
2019–2023	Strasbourg	128	(7)
2023–	Wolverhampton Wanderers	84	(5)

International career^{‡}
2017	France U19	1	(0)
2017–2018	France U20	4	(0)
2019	France U21	3	(0)
2025–	Haiti	17	(1)
- * Club domestic league appearances and goals as of 23:44, 20 September 2026 (UTC) ‡ National team caps and goals as of 03:19, 5 October 2026 (UTC)

Jean-Ricner Bellegarde (French pronunciation: [ʒɑ̃ʁiknɛʁ bɛlɡaʁd]; born 27 June 1998) is a professional footballer who plays as a midfielder for EFL Championship club Wolverhampton Wanderers. Born in France, he represents the Haiti national team.

== Club career ==
=== Lens ===
On 29 July 2016, he played his first professional match with RC Lens on the field of Chamois Niortais FC. He caught attention in the match against Stade de Reims (1–1, 12th round of Ligue 2) by delivering an assist to Viktor Klonaridis. Often present with the reserve team, he also participated in the under-19s' campaign in the Coupe Gambardella.

During the 2017–18 Ligue 2 season, he benefited from the arrival of Éric Sikora, who knew him well from his time in the reserve team, to establish himself in the starting eleven. He was even promoted to captain on a few occasions. On 18 September 2017, he scored his first goal against US Quevilly-Rouen Métropole.

In the 2018–19 Ligue 2 season, he scored a goal in the opening match against US Orléans but gradually lost his place in the starting line-up. He regained it towards the end of the season, scoring consecutively in the last two rounds of the championship—a goal against AC Ajaccio and then a double against US Orléans—to secure Racing's place in the promotion playoffs for Ligue 1.

=== Strasbourg ===
In 2019, Bellegarde joined Strasbourg, where he made 129 appearances.

=== Wolverhampton Wanderers ===
On 1 September 2023, Bellegarde joined Wolverhampton Wanderers on a five-year deal for £12.8m. Later that month, on 23 September, in only his second appearance for his new club away to Luton Town in the Premier League, Bellegarde was shown a straight red card in the 39th minute for his reaction to a challenge by Tom Lockyer. The match finished as a 1–1 draw.

On 4 November 2023, in his third Wolves appearance, away to Sheffield United, where he was introduced as a second-half substitute, Bellegarde scored his debut Wolves goal in the 89th minute. Wolves lost the match 2–1, conceding a penalty deep into time added on at the end of the second-half.

Following his switch of international allegiance to Haiti in August 2025, Bellegarde became the first Haitian-represented player to feature in the Premier League.

== International career ==
Bellegarde was born in France and is of Haitian descent. He was a youth international for France.

In May 2019, he was named to Haiti's 40-man provisional squad for the 2019 CONCACAF Gold Cup.

In August 2025, he was called up for Haiti's national football team for the 2026 FIFA World Cup qualification third round and made his debut on 5 September against Honduras, which ended in a 0–0 draw.

On 15 May 2026, he was included in Haiti head coach Sébastien Migné's 26-man squad for the 2026 FIFA World Cup.

== Career statistics ==
=== Club ===
As of match played 20 September 2026

Appearances and goals by club, season and competition
Club	Season	League			National cup (Note: Includes Coupe de France, FA Cup)		League cup (Note: Includes Coupe de la Ligue, EFL Cup)		Europe		Other		Total	
Club	Season	Division	Apps	Goals	Apps	Goals	Apps	Goals	Apps	Goals	Apps	Goals	Apps	Goals
Lens B	2015–16	Championnat National	23	0	—		—		—		—		23	0
Lens B	2016–17	Championnat National	11	0	—		—		—		—		11	0
Lens B	2018–19	Championnat National	4	0	—		—		—		—		4	0
Lens B	Total		38	0	—		—		—		—		38	0
Lens	2016–17	Ligue 2	9	0	2	0	2	0	—		—		11	0
Lens	2017–18	Ligue 2	25	1	4	0	2	0	—		—		31	1
Lens	2018–19	Ligue 2	21	4	3	1	2	0	—		4 (Note: Appearances in Ligue 1 relegation/promotion play-offs)	1	30	6
Lens	Total		55	5	9	1	6	0	—		4	1	74	7
Strasbourg	2019–20	Ligue 1	24	0	2	1	1	0	3 (Note: Appearances in UEFA Europa League)	0	—		30	1
Strasbourg	2020–21	Ligue 1	36	1	1	0	—		—		—		37	1
Strasbourg	2021–22	Ligue 1	36	2	2	0	—		—		—		38	2
Strasbourg	2022–23	Ligue 1	30	2	1	0	—		—		—		31	2
Strasbourg	2023–24	Ligue 1	3	2	—		—		—		—		3	2
Strasbourg	Total		129	7	6	1	1	0	3	0	—		139	8
Wolverhampton Wanderers	2023–24	Premier League	22	2	4	0	0	0	—		—		26	2
Wolverhampton Wanderers	2024–25	Premier League	35	2	3	0	1	0	—		—		39	2
Wolverhampton Wanderers	2025–26	Premier League	26	1	2	0	3	0	—		—		31	1
Wolverhampton Wanderers	2026–27	Championship	1	0	0	0	1	0	—		—		2	0
Wolverhampton Wanderers	Total		84	5	9	0	5	0	—		—		98	5
Career total			306	17	24	2	12	0	3	0	4	1	349	20

=== International ===
As of match played 4 October 2026

Appearances and goals by national team and year
National team	Year	Apps	Goals
Haiti	2025	6	0
Haiti	2026	11	1
Total		17	1

Scores and results list Haiti's goal tally first, score column indicates score after each Bellegarde goal.

List of international goals scored by Jean-Ricner Bellegarde
No.	Date	Venue	Opponent	Score	Result	Competition
1	27 September 2026	Sabina Park, Kingston, Jamaica	Costa Rica	1–0	2–0	2026–27 CONCACAF Nations League A
