= Kevin Gameiro =

French footballer (born 1987)

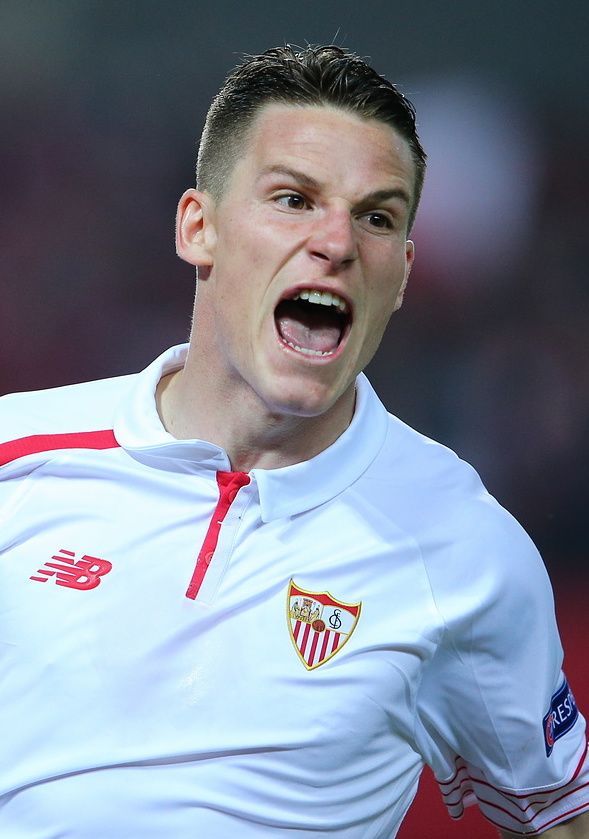
- Gameiro playing for Sevilla in 2016

Personal information
- Full name: Kevin Dominique Gameiro
- Date of birth: 9 May 1987 (age 39)
- Place of birth: Senlis, Oise, France
- Height: 1.72 m (5 ft 8 in)
- Position: Striker

Youth career
- 1993–1999: Marly-la-Ville
- 1999–2004: Chantilly
- 2004–2005: Strasbourg

Senior career*
Years	Team	Apps	(Gls)
2005–2008	Strasbourg	58	(10)
2008–2011	Lorient	108	(50)
2011–2013	Paris Saint-Germain	59	(19)
2013–2016	Sevilla	92	(39)
2016–2018	Atlético Madrid	56	(19)
2018–2021	Valencia	89	(16)
2021–2024	Strasbourg	96	(25)
Total		558	(178)

International career
2004–2005	France U18	2	(0)
2007–2008	France U20	4	(5)
2008–2009	France U21	4	(1)
2010–2017	France	13	(3)
- * Club domestic league appearances and goals

Kevin Dominique Gameiro (born 9 May 1987) is a French former professional footballer who played as a striker. A strong, durable player, he was known for his clinical finishing, which compensated for his relatively light frame.

Gameiro began his football career playing for clubs along the Oise such as Marly-la-Ville and Chantilly. In 2004, he moved to the Alsace region to join professional club Strasbourg, making his professional debut in the 2004–05 season. After three seasons with the club, in August 2008, Gameiro signed a four-year deal with Lorient. With Lorient, he finished his first two seasons with the club as top scorer. In the 2009–10 season, Gameiro contributed to the team that achieved a seventh-place finish, the club's highest finish in Ligue 1 ever. After a brief spell with Paris Saint-Germain between 2011 and 2013, he spent time with a variety of Spanish clubs, namely Sevilla, Atlético Madrid, and Valencia. In July 2021, he returned to Strasbourg, where he played for the club across three seasons, later retiring from football in 2025 as a free agent.

Gameiro is a former France youth international, having earned caps at under-18, under-20, and under-21 level. At under-20 level, he played on the team that won the 2007 edition of the Toulon Tournament. Gameiro scored a hat-trick in the final and finished the competition as its top scorer. In August 2010, he was called up to the senior team for the first time and made his senior international debut on 3 September 2010 in a match against Belarus.

== Early career ==
Gameiro was born in Senlis, a commune in Oise, 35 kilometres (22 mi) north of Paris. His family came from Portugal. He began his football career playing for ES Marly-la-Ville not far from his hometown at the age of six. Prior to turning 13, he opted to remain in the region of Picardie and joined Chantilly. While excelling at US Chantilly, Gameiro was spotted by former Strasbourg player and scout Jacky Duguépéroux who recommended the player join his former club. In 2004, Gameiro completed his move to the Alsatian club joining as a youth player.

== Club career ==
=== Strasbourg ===
Upon arrival, Gameiro was inserted onto the club's reserve team in the Championnat de France Amateur, the fourth level of French football. He spent the entire 2004–05 season playing with the team. Gameiro featured in 20 matches and scored four goals. In 2005, with Duguépéroux now managing the team, Gameiro made his professional debut on 10 September 2005 in a match against Paris Saint-Germain appearing as a substitute in the 59th minute of a 1–0, Ligue 1 defeat. On 14 December, Gameiro made his European debut in a UEFA Cup match against Serbian club Red Star Belgrade. With Strasbourg trailing 2–0 late in the match, Gameiro scored his first professional goal for the club in the 79th minute. In the final minutes of play, he scored the equalizing goal to draw the match at 2–2. The stalemate ensured Strasbourg won the group and the team later advanced to the Round of 16 where they suffered elimination losing 4–2 on aggregate to Swiss club Basel. A month later, Gameiro converted his third goal of the season in the team's 4–0 victory over Nancy in the Coupe de France. In league play, Gameiro scored his first career league goal on 4 February 2006 in a 2–1 loss to Lens. Three weeks later, his season was cut short after rupturing ligaments in one of his knees following a tackle from Troyes midfielder Blaise Kouassi. The injury required six months of rehabilitation, which resulted in Gameiro missing the Coupe Gambardella competition, which the Strasbourg under-19 team won, defeating Lyon 3–1 in the final at the Stade de France. Overall, Gameiro's season was a success, however, due to the club focusing more on Europe, the team suffered relegation to Ligue 2 for the 2006–07 season.

Due to undergoing rehabilitation on his knee, Gameiro made his debut with Strasbourg in Ligue 2 late in the season on 19 September 2006 in the club's 2–0 loss to Auxerre in the Coupe de la Ligue. He scored his first goal two months later in a 2–0 victory over Istres. Through the rest of the season, Gameiro alternated between the bench and the starting eleven. He only scored two goals, against Gueugnon and Istres, again, for the rest of the season as Strasbourg achieved promotion back to Ligue 1 courtesy of the club's 3rd-place finish. In his first full season as a professional, Gameiro scored six total goals in 36 total appearances. He scored in back-to-back matches during the early portion of the season against Auxerre and Toulouse, but went cold mid-season scoring only two goals. He scored his final two goals for the club in the final two matches of the season against Caen and Marseille. Strasbourg lost both matches, causing Strasbourg to again suffer relegation to Ligue 2.

=== Lorient ===
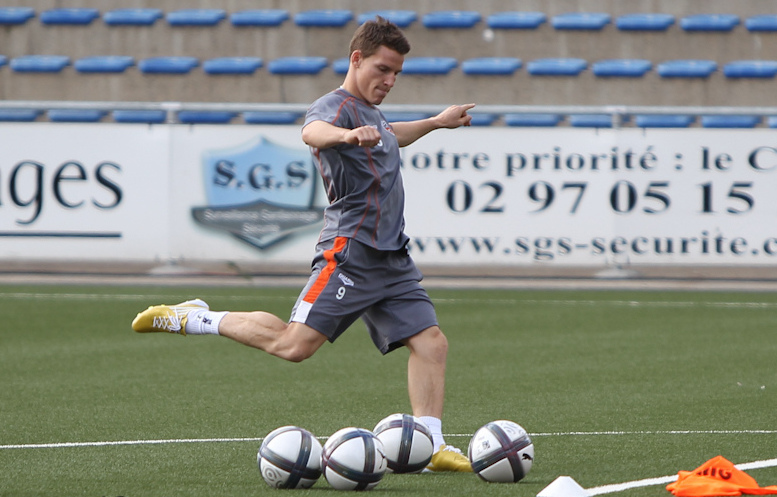
Gameiro training with Lorient in 2010

Despite strong interest from Marseille, on 17 June 2008, Gameiro agreed to a four-year deal with Brittany-based outfit Lorient. The club paid Strasbourg a transfer fee of €3 million for his services. Gameiro was given the number 9 shirt and installed as the club's head striker. He made his club debut on 9 August 2008 playing the entire match in a 1–0 victory over Le Mans. Two weeks later, he scored his first goal for the club in a 3–1 defeat to Valenciennes. On 25 October, he contributed to Lorient's 3–0 rout of Brittany rivals Nantes. The following month, Gameiro scored goals in back-to-back matches on two occasions. Lorient went undefeated in the four matches. In the Coupe de France, Lorient reached the Round of 16. Gameiro scored goals against Alençon and Tours in the Round of 64 and Round of 32, respectively. Gameiro continued his consistency during the spring portion of the season scoring goals against Sochaux, Grenoble, Marseille and Nancy. Gameiro scored a double against the latter club. He finished the season with 39 total appearances and 13 goals. Lorient finished the season in tenth, tied for the club's highest finish ever in the first division.

Gameiro continued his rise in French football in the 2009–10 Ligue 1 season. He scored on his season debut on 8 August 2009 in a 2–1 win over Lille and converted another goal the following week against Montpellier in a 2–2 draw. A month later, he scored in back-to-back matches against Nancy and Grenoble as Lorient won both matches. Two weeks later, he scored in Lorient's 4–1 victory over Nice and, on 7 November, scored a double in the club's 5–0 thrashing of Boulogne. On 28 October, Gameiro scored the equalizing goal in Lorient's 2–2 stalemate with Grenoble converting the goal in injury time. The draw rose Lorient to 5th in the standings, the club's highest position that late in the season ever. On 27 January 2010, Gameiro scored the only goal in Lorient's upset victory over Lyon in the Coupe de la Ligue. Two weeks later, he scored in Lorient's 3–0 humiliation of Paris Saint-Germain at the Parc des Princes. The following week, Gameiro scored in a 1–1 draw with Toulouse. His consistent form prompted analysts to declare that Gameiro should be considered for the France national team, however, prior to the friendly against Spain on 3 March, Gameiro picked up an injury, which led to coach Raymond Domenech not considering him for the squad. Gameiro finished the 2009–10 campaign by scoring seven goals in the final nine league matches. He scored a brace against Saint-Étienne and converted opening goals in wins over Bordeaux, Grenoble, and Lille. In the six matches he scored in, Lorient won five and ultimately finished the campaign in 7th place; the club's highest finish in Ligue 1 ever.

In the 2010–11 season, Gameiro remained consistent. After missing the opening league match of the season, he returned to the team in mid-August. On 28 August, he scored the game-winning goal in a 2–0 victory over Lyon. In December, he played a part in all three goals in the team's 6–3 loss to Lille. Gameiro scored the team's opening goal in the 7th minute, netted his second just before half-time, and assisted on Lynel Kitambala's in the second half. In January 2011, Gameiro was the subject of intense transfer speculation. On 4 January, it was reported that the striker had reached an agreement on a contract with Spanish club Valencia. Despite the reported agreement, Lorient president Loïc Féry declared that while personal terms had been agreed, Valencia had never sent in a transfer fee offer for the player. Later in the month, French media reported that Lorient had accepted a bid from fellow Ligue 1 club Bordeaux. Bordeaux officials, however, revealed that Gameiro's preference was to play for Valencia. Ultimately, Gameiro remained with Lorient following the closure of the transfer window as Fery declared "our priority has always been to keep Kevin with us". Despite the speculation of a possible transfer, Gameiro remained potent on the field of play. Beginning in late January, he proceeded to go on a tear scoring seven goals in the team's four ensuing league matches. On 29 January, Gameiro scored both goals in a 2–0 win against Brest. In the next two weeks, he scored goals in a home win over Caen and an away defeat to Monaco. The impressive tally of goals culminated on 19 February 2011 when Gameiro scored a hat-trick in a 5–1 victory over Bordeaux.

=== Paris Saint-Germain ===
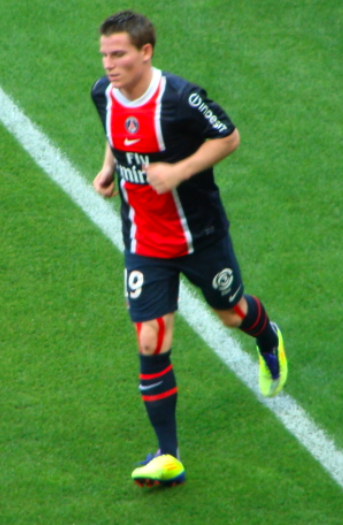
Gameiro playing for Paris Saint-Germain in 2011

On 10 June 2011, media reports confirmed that Paris Saint-Germain had reached an agreement with Lorient for the transfer of Gameiro. The striker had previously favored a move to either Paris Saint-Germain or Valencia. Two days later, following a successful medical, the transfer was confirmed by Paris Saint-Germain. Gameiro agreed to a four-year contract and the transfer fee was priced at €11 million with future bonuses to be added later. Gameiro made his competitive debut for Paris Saint-Germain on 6 August 2011 in the team's opening 1–0 league defeat to Lorient. The following week, he scored his first goal for the club in its 1–1 draw with Rennes. On 18 August 2011, in Paris Saint-Germain's first leg UEFA Europa League playoff round tie against Luxembourger club Differdange, Gameiro scored the opening goal for the team in a 4–0 away win. Three days later, he again scored a goal in a 2–1 win over Valenciennes helping Paris Saint-Germain earn its first league win of the season. On 16 October, Gameiro achieved a hat trick in his side's 3–1 defeat of Ajaccio. Gameiro scored once more in 2011, against Sochaux, before his club thundered into the new year, remaining undefeated in 2012 as far as 31 March. Gameiro scored on 20 January, against Sablé-sur-Sarthe in the Coupe de France match on 4 February against Evian, and 11 March against Dijon. After this barrage of victories for his club, and assortment of goals for himself, Gameiro failed to score again in the 11/12 campaign.

Gameiro's first goal in the 12/13 campaign came 29 September 2012 against Sochaux, coupled with a second 22 minutes later. Gameiro scored thrice more in 2012, with goals coming against Reims, Evian and Brest. Gameiro scored his first goal in 2013 against Toulouse, on 23 January, in Coupe de France play. Gameiro scored a notable assist when PSG squared off against Valencia in Champions League play, with Gameiro feeding Ezequiel Lavezzi for a 66th-minute goal, bequeathing PSG the aggregate victory. Gameiro's next goal came 29 March against Montpellier; 2013's final Gameiro goals were both scored against Gameiro's former outfit Lorient on 26 May. Given that Gameiro was transferred in the offseason, this occasion marked both his last scoring performance and last match for PSG.

=== Sevilla ===
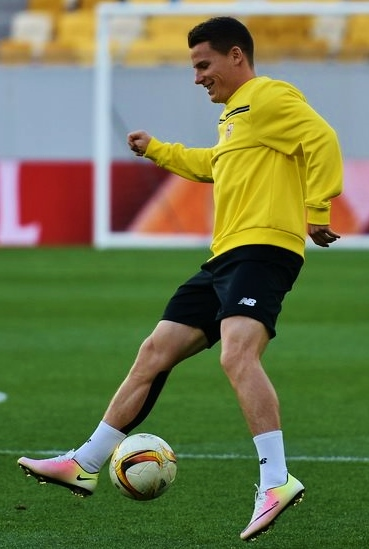
Gameiro in training with Sevilla in 2016

On 25 July 2013, Gameiro signed a contract with Sevilla for a fee of €10 million, agreeing to a five-year deal for the Ramón Sánchez Pizjuán club. In his first training session with the club on 30 July, Gameiro limped off the field with a groin injury, forcing the French striker out of the club's third-round Europa League clash with Mladost Podgorica.

Gameiro scored his first goal for the Spanish side in their first-leg Europa League play-off tie against Śląsk Wrocław, a 4–1 home win on 22 August. On 1 September, Gameiro achieved a brace against Málaga, including a header, but this failed to bring victory to his side as the match ended in a 2–2 draw. Following this, Gameiro scored on five occasions, including a 1 December contest against Granada, in which he also garnered a yellow card. On 16 March 2014, Gameiro netted a double as Sevilla thrashed Real Valladolid 4–1.

Gameiro scored a goal in either half against Espanyol on 6 April, helping his side record a 4–1 league victory. On 10 April 2014, Gameiro came off the bench and scored Sevilla's fourth and final goal in a Europa League quarter-final second-leg match, securing a 4–2 aggregate victory over Porto and a spot in the semi-finals of the 2013–14 Europa League. In the 2013–14 La Liga Seville derby against Real Betis three days later, Gameiro scored twice more to give Sevilla a 2–0 away victory. In the final of the 2013–14 Europa League against Portuguese side Benfica on 14 May 2014, Gameiro came off the bench in extra time and scored the game-winning penalty kick to secure a 4–2 shoot-out victory for Sevilla.

On 24 October 2015, Gameiro netted a hat-trick in a 2015–16 La Liga home match against Getafe, in which Sevilla won 5–0, his first La Liga hat-trick.

On 18 May 2016, just 17 seconds into the second half of the 2016 UEFA Europa League Final against Liverpool, Gameiro scored Sevilla's equalizing goal a metre from the goal line after receiving a low cross from Mariano Ferreira Filho who had burst into the penalty box from the right. That was his eighth 2015-16 UEFA Europa League goal. Sevilla won the match 3–1 setting the at record first team to win the UEFA Cup/Europa League three consecutive seasons. It was their fifth successive UEFA Cup/Europa League title.

=== Atlético Madrid ===
On 30 July 2016, Atlético Madrid reached an agreement with Sevilla for the transfer of Gameiro on a four-year contract for a reported €32 million rising to €40 million with add-ons.

On 18 February 2017, Gameiro scored the fastest La Liga hat-trick in over 22 years, coming on a substitute in the 62nd minute in the match against Sporting de Gijón in a 4–1 victory.

=== Valencia ===
On 12 August 2018, Valencia reached an agreement with Atlético Madrid to sign Gameiro for €16 million.

=== Return to Strasbourg ===
On 18 July 2021, Strasbourg announced the return of Gameiro on a two-year deal, bringing him back to the club after 13 years.

=== Retirement ===
On 16 March 2025, after being without a club since July 2024, Gameiro announced his retirement from professional football.

== International career ==
Gameiro represented France internationally at the under-18, under-20, and under-21 levels. He made his under-18 debut on 29 October 2004 in a friendly match against Russia. Gameiro made his lone other appearance with the under-18 team in the return match against Russia two days later. He established himself locally for his performance at the 2007 Toulon Tournament with the under-20 team. Gameiro scored five goals in four matches scoring only one goal in the group stage portion of the competition against Ivory Coast. In the semi-finals, Gameiro scored the only goal in the team's victory over Portugal. In the final against China, Gameiro netted a hat trick, which took only 33 minutes to complete in the team's 3–1 victory. Gameiro was named the Player of the Tournament for his performances. He made his under-21 debut on 26 March 2008 in a friendly against the Czech Republic. Gameiro, on his debut, netted the third goal in the team's 4–1 victory. Gameiro was called up for the under-21 team's 2009 UEFA European Under-21 Football Championship qualification play-offs tie against Germany, but did not feature in either leg. France lost the tie 2–1 on aggregate. The negative result ended Gameiro's under-21 career.

In August 2010, Gameiro was called up to the French senior team for the first time by new manager Laurent Blanc for the team's UEFA Euro 2012 qualification matches against Belarus and Bosnia and Herzegovina. He made his senior team debut in the match against Belarus appearing as a substitute in the second half. On 9 February 2011, Gameiro earned his second career cap in the team's 1–0 victory over Brazil. In his next appearance with the team against Ukraine on 6 June, he scored his first international goal netting the team's opener in a 4–1 win. On 7 October 2016, he scored a brace in the 2018 World Cup qualification match against Bulgaria, which France won 4–1.

Due to having Portuguese heritage through his paternal grandfather, Gameiro was eligible to represent Portugal at the senior international level. In 2009, then-manager Carlos Queiroz declared that Gameiro was "an interesting player" and that he "would love to talk to him" regarding representing Portugal. However, Gameiro downplayed the talk, stating that he "didn't really have any links to the country" and that he preferred to represent France.

== Career statistics ==
=== Club ===
Appearances and goals by club, season and competition
Club	Season	League			National cup (Note: Includes Coupe de France, Copa del Rey)		League cup (Note: Includes Coupe de la Ligue)		Europe		Other		Total	
Club	Season	Division	Apps	Goals	Apps	Goals	Apps	Goals	Apps	Goals	Apps	Goals	Apps	Goals
Strasbourg	2005–06	Ligue 1	8	1	1	2	0	0	3 (Note: Appearances in UEFA Cup)	2	—		12	5
Strasbourg	2006–07	Ligue 2	16	3	3	3	1	0	—		—		20	6
Strasbourg	2007–08	Ligue 1	34	6	1	0	1	0	—		—		36	6
Strasbourg	Total		58	10	5	5	2	0	3	2	—		68	17
Lorient	2008–09	Ligue 1	37	11	2	2	0	0	—		—		39	13
Lorient	2009–10	Ligue 1	35	17	1	0	4	2	—		—		40	19
Lorient	2010–11	Ligue 1	36	22	3	2	2	0	—		—		41	24
Lorient	Total		108	50	6	4	6	2	—		—		120	56
Paris Saint-Germain	2011–12	Ligue 1	34	11	3	2	1	0	7 (Note: Appearances in UEFA Europa League)	1	—		45	14
Paris Saint-Germain	2012–13	Ligue 1	25	8	4	1	0	0	3 (Note: Appearances in UEFA Champions League)	0	—		32	9
Paris Saint-Germain	Total		59	19	7	3	1	0	10	1	—		77	23
Sevilla	2013–14	La Liga	35	15	1	0	—		12	6	—		48	21
Sevilla	2014–15	La Liga	26	8	6	5	—		12	4	0	0	44	17
Sevilla	2015–16	La Liga	31	16	6	3	—		14 (Note: Five appearances and one goal in UEFA Champions League, nine appearances and eight goals in UEFA Europa League)	9	1 (Note: Appearance in UEFA Super Cup)	1	52	29
Sevilla	Total		92	39	13	8	—		38	19	1	1	144	67
Atlético Madrid	2016–17	La Liga	31	12	6	2	—		9	2	—		46	16
Atlético Madrid	2017–18	La Liga	25	7	3	1	—		8 (Note: Three appearances and one goal in UEFA Champions League, five appearances and two goals in UEFA Europa League)	3	—		38	11
Atlético Madrid	Total		56	19	9	3	—		17	5	—		82	27
Valencia	2018–19	La Liga	33	6	9	3	—		13 (Note: Five appearances in UEFA Champions League, eight appearances and three goals in UEFA Europa League)	3	—		55	12
Valencia	2019–20	La Liga	29	6	2	0	—		7	2	1 (Note: Appearance in Supercopa de España)	0	39	8
Valencia	2020–21	La Liga	27	4	0	0	—		—		—		27	4
Valencia	Total		89	16	11	3	—		20	5	1	0	121	24
Strasbourg	2021–22	Ligue 1	35	11	2	0	—		—		—		37	11
Strasbourg	2022–23	Ligue 1	34	10	1	0	—		—		—		35	10
Strasbourg	2023–24	Ligue 1	27	4	3	1	—		—		—		30	5
Strasbourg	Total		96	25	6	1	—		—		—		102	26
Career total			558	178	57	27	9	2	88	32	2	1	714	240

=== International ===
Appearances and goals by national team and year
National team	Year	Apps	Goals
France	2010	1	0
France	2011	7	1
France	2012	0	0
France	2013	0	0
France	2014	0	0
France	2015	0	0
France	2016	4	2
France	2017	1	0
Total		13	3

Scores and results list France's goal tally first, score column indicates score after each Gameiro goal.

List of international goals scored by Kevin Gameiro
No.	Date	Venue	Opponent	Score	Result	Competition
1	6 June 2011	Donbas Arena, Donetsk, Ukraine	Ukraine	1–1	4–1	Friendly
2	7 October 2016	Stade de France, Saint-Denis, France	Bulgaria	1–1	4–1	2018 FIFA World Cup qualification
3	7 October 2016	Stade de France, Saint-Denis, France	Bulgaria	4–1	4–1	2018 FIFA World Cup qualification

== Honours ==
Paris Saint-Germain

- Ligue 1: 2012–13

Sevilla

- UEFA Europa League: 2013–14, 2014–15, 2015–16

Atlético Madrid

- UEFA Europa League: 2017–18

Valencia

- Copa del Rey: 2018–19

France U20

- Toulon Tournament: 2007

Individual

- UNFP Ligue 1 Team of the Year: 2010–11
- UEFA Europa League Squad of the Season: 2015–16
