= 2024–25 FCV Dender EH season =

Dender EH
2024–25 season
- Chairman: Belinda Siahaan
- Manager: Vincent Euvrard
- Stadium: Van Roystadion
- Belgian Pro League: Pre-season
- Belgian Cup: Pre-season

The 2024–25 season is Dender EH's 89th season in existence and first back in the Belgian Pro League. They will also compete in the Belgian Cup.

== Players ==
=== First-team squad ===
As of 20 July 2024

No.	Player	Position(s)	Nationality	Place of birth	Date of birth (age)	Signed from	Date signed	Fee	Contract end
Goalkeepers
13	Julien Devriendt	GK	(Belgium)	Vilvoorde	25 November 1998 (age 27)	(Belgium) Aalst	30 June 2020	Free transfer	30 June 2026
30	Guillaume Dietsh	GK	(France)	Forbach	17 April 2001 (age 25)	(France) FC Metz	1 July 2024	Undisclosed	30 June 2026
34	Michael Verrips	GK	(Netherlands)	Velp	3 December 1996 (age 29)	(Netherlands) Fortuna Sittard	18 July 2024	Free transfer	Unknown
Defenders
3	Joedrick Pupe	DF	(Belgium)	Brugge	4 June 1997 (age 28)	(Belgium) Lierse	4 July 2023	Free transfer	30 June 2027
4	Bryan Goncalves	DF	(France)	Maisons-Laffitte	19 July 1996 (age 29)	(Belgium) Beveren	1 July 2024	Undisclosed	30 June 2026
20	David Hrncar	DF	(Slovakia)	Žilina	10 December 1996 (age 29)	(Belgium) Beveren	1 July 2024	Undisclosed	30 June 2026
21	Kobe Cools	DF	(Belgium)	Unknown	25 July 1997 (age 28)	(Luxembourg) F91 Dudelange	1 July 2022	Free transfer	30 June 2025
22	Gilles Ruyssen	DF	(Belgium)	Unknown	18 June 1994 (age 31)	(Belgium) RWDM	20 January 2023	Undisclosed	30 June 2025
88	Fabio Ferraro	DF	(Belgium)	Halle	3 September 2002 (age 23)	(Belgium) RWDM	3 August 2023	Undisclosed	30 June 2025
Midfielders
6	Kéres Masangu	MF	(Belgium)	Antwerp	11 March 2000 (age 26)	(Belgium) Virton	1 July 2023	Free transfer	30 June 2026
7	Ridwane M'Barki	MF	(Belgium)	Dilbeek	2 July 1994 (age 31)	(Belgium) Lommel	1 July 2017	Free transfer	30 June 2026
8	Jasper Van Oudenhove	MF	(Belgium)	Unknown	3 November 1998 (age 27)	(Belgium) Club NXT	1 July 2019	Free transfer	30 June 2025
10	Lennard Hens	MF	(Belgium)	Unknown	8 February 1996 (age 30)	(Belgium) Rupel Boom	1 July 2019	Free transfer	30 June 2025
12	Antoine De Bodt	MF	(Belgium)	Brussels	17 October 1999 (age 26)	Academy	1 July 2018	—N/a	30 June 2025
15	Danny Fofana	MF	(Belgium)	Unknown	2 August 2002 (age 23)	Academy	1 July 2022	—N/a	Unknown
16	Roman Květ	MF	(Czech Republic)	Benešov	17 December 1997 (age 28)	(Czech Republic) Viktoria Plzeň	1 July 2024	Loan	30 June 2025
18	Nathan Rôdes	MF	(Belgium)	Etterbeek	11 December 1997 (age 28)	(Belgium) RFC Liège	1 July 2022	Free transfer	30 June 2025
23	Desmond Acquah	MF	(Belgium)	Unknown	23 July 2002 (age 23)	(Belgium) OH Leuven	1 July 2024	Undisclosed	30 June 2026
24	Malcolm Viltard	MF	(France)	Carcassonne	24 October 2002 (age 23)	(France) FCSM	1 July 2024	€250,000	30 June 2027
Forwards
9	Michael Lallemand	FW	(Belgium)	Eupen	11 February 1993 (age 33)	(Belgium) RFC Liège	1 July 2022	Free transfer	30 June 2025
17	Abdoulaye Yahaya	FW	(Cameroon)	Bertoua	7 October 2001 (age 24)	(Turkey) Tuzlaspor	13 February 2024	Free transfer	30 June 2026
19	Ali Akman	FW	(Turkey)	Bursa	18 April 2002 (age 24)	(Germany) Frankfurt	10 August 2023	Undisclosed	30 June 2025
26	Ragnar Oratmangoen	FW	(Indonesia)	Oss	21 January 1998 (age 28)	(Netherlands) Groningen	13 August 2024	Free transfer	30 June 2026
77	Bruny Nsimba	FW	(Belgium)	Unknown	5 April 2000 (age 26)	(Belgium) Beveren	1 July 2023	Free transfer	30 June 2025
90	Mohamed Berte	FW	(Belgium)	Brussels	25 March 2002 (age 24)	(Belgium) Oostende	1 July 2024	Free transfer	30 June 2027
98	Jordy Soladio	FW	(Belgium)	Unknown	12 February 1998 (age 28)	(Vietnam) SLNA FC	30 August 2023	Free transfer	30 June 2025

== Transfers ==
=== In ===
Date	Position	Nationality	Player	From	Fee	Ref.
30 June 2024	Midfielder	(Belgium)	Danny Fofana	(Belgium) Union Namur	Return from loan	
13 August 2024	Forward	(Indonesia)	Ragnar Oratmangoen	(Netherlands) FC Groningen	Free transfer	

=== Out ===
Date	Position	Nationality	Player	To	Fee	Ref.

=== Loaned In ===
Date	Position	Nationality	Player	From	Fee	Ref.

=== Loaned Out ===
Date	Position	Nationality	Player	To	Ref.

== Pre-season and friendlies ==
Win Draw Loss Fixtures

10 July 2024	Groningen	4–4	Dender

10 July 2024	Heracles	1–1	Dender

17 July 2024	Club Brugge	0–0	Dender

20 July 2024	Dender	0–3	La Louvière

== Competitions ==
=== Overall record ===
Competition	First match	Last match	Starting round	Record							
Competition	First match	Last match	Starting round	Pld	W	D	L	GF	GA	GD	Win %
Belgian Pro League	27 July 2024		Matchday 1	0	0	0	0	0	0	+0	—
Belgian Cup				0	0	0	0	0	0	+0	—
Total				0	0	0	0	0	0	+0	—

Source: Competitions

=== Belgian Pro League ===
==== League table ====
Pos	Team	Pld	W	D	L	GF	GA	GD	Pts	Qualification or relegation
10	Charleroi	30	10	7	13	36	36	0	37	Qualification for the Europe play-offs
11	OH Leuven	30	8	13	9	28	33	−5	37	Qualification for the Europe play-offs
12	Dender EH	30	8	8	14	33	51	−18	32	Qualification for the Europe play-offs
13	Cercle Brugge	30	7	11	12	29	44	−15	32	Qualification for the Relegation play-offs
14	Sint-Truiden	30	7	10	13	41	56	−15	31	Qualification for the Relegation play-offs

Source: Jupiler Pro League (in Dutch), Soccerway
Rules for classification: 1) Points; 2) Matches won; 3) Goal difference; 4) Goals scored; 5) Away matches won; 6) Away goal difference; 7) Away goals scored; 8) Play-off.

==== Results summary ====
Overall								Home						Away					
Pld	W	D	L	GF	GA	GD	Pts	W	D	L	GF	GA	GD	W	D	L	GF	GA	GD
0	0	0	0	0	0	0	0	0	0	0	0	0	0	0	0	0	0	0	0

==== Results by round ====
Round	1
Ground	
Result	
Position	

A = Away; H = Home; W = Win; D = Draw; L = Loss

==== Matches ====
Win Draw Loss Fixtures

27 July 2024 1	Dender	v	Union SG	Denderleeuw
16:00 CEST				Stadium: Van Roystadion

4 August 2024 2	Gent	v	Dender	Ghent
19:15 CEST				Stadium: Ghelamco Arena

10 August 2024 3	Dender	v	Kortrijk	Denderleeuw
16:00 CEST				Stadium: Van Roystadion

17 August 2024 4	STVV	v	Dender	Sint-Truiden
18:15 CEST				Stadium: Stayen

25 August 2024 5	Dender	v	Club Brugge	Denderleeuw
13:30 CEST				Stadium: Van Roystadion

31 August 2024 6	Beerschot	v	Dender	Antwerp
18:15 CEST				Stadium: Olympisch Stadion

13 September 2024 7	Dender	v	Standard Liège	Denderleeuw
20:45 CEST				Stadium: Van Roystadion

TBD 8	Genk	v	Dender	Genk
TBD				Stadium: Cegeka Arena

TBD 9	Dender	v	Anderlecht	Denderleeuw
TBD				Stadium: Van Roystadion

TBD 10	Dender	v	Charleroi	Denderleeuw
TBD				Stadium: Van Roystadion

TBD 11	Cercle Brugge	v	Dender	Brugge
TBD				Stadium: Jan Breydel Stadium

TBD 12	Dender	v	Mechelen	Denderleeuw
TBD				Stadium: Van Roystadion

TBD 13	Westerlo	v	Dender	Westerlo
TBD				Stadium: Het Kuipje

TBD 14	Dender	v	OH Leuven	Denderleeuw
TBD				Stadium: Van Roystadion

TBD 15	Antwerp	v	Dender	Antwerp
TBD				Stadium: Bosuilstadion

TBD 16	Club Brugge	v	Dender	Brugge
TBD				Stadium: Jan Breydel Stadium

TBD 17	Dender	v	Westerlo	Denderleeuw
TBD				Stadium: Van Roystadion

TBD 18	Kortrijk	v	Dender	Kortrijk
TBD				Stadium: Guldensporen Stadion

TBD 19	Dender	v	Antwerp	Denderleeuw
TBD				Stadium: Van Roystadion

TBD 20	Anderlecht	v	Dender	Brussels
TBD				Stadium: Lotto Park

TBD 21	Dender	v	Gent	Denderleeuw
TBD				Stadium: Van Roystadion

TBD 22	Dender	v	Cercle Brugge	Denderleeuw
TBD				Stadium: Van Roystadion

TBD 23	Standard Liège	v	Dender	Liège
TBD				Stadium: Stade Maurice Dufrasne

TBD 24	Charleroi	v	Dender	Charleroi
TBD				Stadium: Stade du Pays de Charleroi

TBD 25	Dender	v	STVV	Denderleeuw
TBD				Stadium: Van Roystadion

TBD 26	OH Leuven	v	Dender	Leuven
TBD				Stadium: Den Dreef

TBD 27	Dender	v	Beerschot	Denderleeuw
TBD				Stadium: Van Roystadion

TBD 28	Union SG	v	Dender	Brussels
TBD				Stadium: Joseph Marien Stadium

TBD 29	Dender	v	Genk	Denderleeuw
TBD				Stadium: Van Roystadion

TBD 30	Mechelen	v	Dender	Mechelen
TBD				Stadium: AFAS-stadion Achter de Kazerne

=== Belgian Cup ===
Win Draw Loss Fixtures
