= Mathieu Le Scornet =

French football manager (born 1983)

Personal information
- Date of birth: 2 May 1983 (age 43)
- Place of birth: Metz, France

Managerial career
- Years: Team
- 2018–2021: Rennes (assistant)
- 2021–2023: Strasbourg (assistant)
- 2023: Strasbourg
- 2023–2024: Strasbourg (assistant)
- 2024-: Strasbourg II

Mathieu Le Scornet (born 2 May 1983) is a French football manager. He was the interim manager of Ligue 1 club Strasbourg for six games in 2023.

== Managerial statistics ==
As of match played 12 February 2023

Managerial record by team and tenure
Team	From	To	Record								Ref
Team	From	To	G	W	D	L	GF	GA	GD	Win %	Ref
Strasbourg	9 January 2023	13 February 2023	6	2	1	3	7	10	−3	33.33	
Total			6	2	1	3	7	10	−3	33.33	—
