= Guillaume Furrer =

Swiss footballer (born 2001)

Personal information
- Full name: Guillaume Ronan Furrer
- Date of birth: 28 January 2001 (age 25)
- Place of birth: Chêne-Bougeries, Switzerland
- Height: 1.80 m (5 ft 11 in)
- Position: Forward

Team information
- Current team: Aarau
- Number: 17

Youth career
- Servette
- –2019: Zürich

Senior career*
Years	Team	Apps	(Gls)
2018–2019	Zürich II	26	(3)
2019–2023	SC Freiburg II	57	(7)
2023–2024	Baden	27	(4)
2024–2025	Xamax	20	(1)
2025–2026	Lecco	33	(4)
2026–	Aarau	3	(0)

International career^{‡}
2017	Switzerland U17	3	(0)
2018	Switzerland U18	1	(0)
2020	Switzerland U19	1	(0)
2020	Switzerland U20	1	(0)
- * Club domestic league appearances and goals as of 18 September 2026 ‡ National team caps and goals as of 19:56, 27 July 2021 (UTC)

Guillaume Ronan Furrer (born 28 January 2001) is a Swiss professional footballer who plays as a forward for Swiss Challenge League club Aarau.

== Club career ==
On 7 September 2023, Furrer signed with Baden.

On 11 June 2024, Furrer officially joined Challenge League club Xamax. Having scored one goal in 21 appearances for the team throughout the 2024–25 season, he terminated his contract with Xamax by mutual consent on 11 June 2025.

On 13 June 2025, it was announced that Furrer would join Italian club Lecco on a free transfer since 1 July of the same year, signing a two-year contract in the process.
