= Franci Bouebari =

French footballer (born 2003)

Personal information
- Full name: Franci Clarck Bouebari Kitsamoutse
- Date of birth: 12 September 2003 (age 23)
- Place of birth: Strasbourg, France
- Height: 1.87 m (6 ft 2 in)
- Position: Centre-back

Team information
- Current team: Rot-Weiss Essen
- Number: 19

Youth career
- Strasbourg

Senior career*
| Years | Team | Apps | (Gls) |
| 2022–2023 | Strasbourg II | 19 | (0) |
| 2023 | Strasbourg | 2 | (0) |
| 2023–2026 | SC Freiburg II | 44 | (0) |
| 2025–2026 | → Rot-Weiss Essen (loan) | 25 | (1) |
| 2026– | Rot-Weiss Essen | 0 | (0) |
- * Club domestic league appearances and goals as of 20 May 2026

Franci Clarck Bouebari Kitsamoutse (born 12 September 2003) is a French professional footballer who plays as a centre-back for German 3. Liga club Rot-Weiss Essen.

== Career ==
Bouebari is a youth product of Strasbourg, and was promoted to their reserves in 2022. He made his professional debut with Strasbourg in a 2–1 Ligue 1 win over Lyon on 14 January 2023, coming on as an early substitute and assisting his side's first goal.

Bouebari joined SC Freiburg II in June 2023. On 1 July 2025, he was loaned to Rot-Weiss Essen. On 28 May 2026, Rot-Weiss made the transfer permanent.
