= Mehdi Chahiri =

French footballer (born 1996)

Personal information
- Date of birth: 25 July 1996 (age 30)
- Place of birth: Grande-Synthe, France
- Height: 1.80 m (5 ft 11 in)
- Position: Left winger

Youth career
- 2014–2015: Lorient
- 2015–2016: Olympique Grande-Synthe

Senior career*
Years	Team	Apps	(Gls)
2016–2019	USL Dunkerque	32	(2)
2019–2020	Red Star	22	(11)
2020–2023	Strasbourg	24	(2)
2021–2022	→ Caen B (loan)	1	(0)
2021–2022	→ Caen (loan)	13	(3)
2022–2023	→ Paris FC (loan)	29	(4)
2022–2023	→ Paris FC B (loan)	1	(0)
2023–2025	Pau	29	(1)
- * Club domestic league appearances and goals as of 12 May 2025

Mehdi Chahiri (born 25 July 1996) is a French professional footballer who plays as a left winger.

== Career ==
Chahiri transferred from USL Dunkerque to fellow Championnat National side Red Star in 2019. He had a breakout campaign with Red Star during the 2019–20 Championnat National season, scoring 13 goals in 19 matches in all competitions in the first half of the season. His great form with Red Star earned him a transfer to Strasbourg in Ligue 1, with whom he signed a four-and-a-half-year contract on 31 January 2020. He returned to Red Star on loan for the rest of the season.

Chahiri marked his Strasbourg and Ligue 1 debut against FC Lorient on 23 August 2020 with a goal, but his side fell to a 1–3 defeat.

On 31 August 2021, he joined Caen on loan. On 21 June 2022, Chahiri moved on loan to Paris FC.

On 2 September 2023, Chahiri signed a 2-year contract with Pau in Ligue 2.

== Personal life ==
Born in France, Chahiri is of Moroccan descent.

== Career statistics ==
As of match played on 2 June 2023

Appearances and goals by club, season and competition
Club	Season	League			National Cup		League Cup		Other		Total	
Club	Season	Division	Apps	Goals	Apps	Goals	Apps	Goals	Apps	Goals	Apps	Goals
USL Dunkerque	2016–17	Championnat National	2	0	0	0	0	0	0	0	2	0
USL Dunkerque	2017–18	Championnat National	4	0	0	0	0	0	0	0	4	0
USL Dunkerque	2018–19	Championnat National	26	2	1	0	0	0	0	0	27	2
USL Dunkerque	Total		32	2	1	0	0	0	0	0	33	2
Red Star	2019–20	Championnat National	22	11	2	1	1	2	0	0	25	14
Strasbourg	2020–21	Ligue 1	23	2	1	0	0	0	0	0	24	2
Strasbourg	2021–22	Ligue 1	1	0	0	0	0	0	0	0	1	0
Strasbourg	Total		24	2	1	0	0	0	0	0	25	2
SM Caen Reserves (loan)	2021–22	Championnat National 2	1	0	0	0	0	0	0	0	1	0
Caen (loan)	2021–22	Ligue 2	13	3	0	0	0	0	0	0	13	3
Paris FC (loan)	2022–23	Ligue 2	29	4	3	1	0	0	0	0	32	5
Paris FC Reserves (loan)	2022–23	Championnat National 3	1	0	0	0	0	0	0	0	1	0
Career total			122	22	7	2	1	2	0	0	130	26
