= Alexandre Pierre =

Footballer (born 2001)

Personal information
- Date of birth: 25 February 2001 (age 25)
- Place of birth: Aubervilliers, France
- Height: 1.90 m (6 ft 3 in)
- Position: Goalkeeper

Team information
- Current team: Sochaux
- Number: 30

Youth career
- Laval

Senior career*
Years	Team	Apps	(Gls)
2018–2019	Laval II	2	(0)
2019–2020	Angers II	0	(0)
2020–2024	Strasbourg II	31	(0)
2021–2022	→ Annecy (loan)	0	(0)
2023–2024	Strasbourg	0	(0)
2024–	Sochaux	26	(0)
2024–	Sochaux B	25	(0)

International career^{‡}
2022–	Haiti	19	(0)
- * Club domestic league appearances and goals as of 23 June 2026 ‡ National team caps and goals as of 22:14, 2 October 2026 (UTC)

Alexandre Pierre (born 25 February 2001) is a professional footballer who plays as a goalkeeper for Ligue 2 club Sochaux. Born in France, he plays for the Haiti national team.

== Club career ==
Pierre began his senior career with the reserves of Laval in 2018. From 2019 to 2020, he was the backup goalkeeper at the reserves of Angers. In May 2020, he signed a 3-year contract with Strasbourg, originally going to their reserves as well. He joined Annecy on loan in the Championnat National for the second half of the 2021–22 season on 2 December 2021.

== International career ==
Born in France, Pierre holds French and Haïtian nationalities. He debuted in a 0–0 CONCACAF Nations League tie with Bermuda on 4 June 2022.

On 15 May 2026, he was included in Haiti head coach Sébastien Migné's 26-man squad for the 2026 FIFA World Cup.

== Career statistics ==
=== International ===
As of match played 2 October 2026

Appearances and goals by national team and year
National team	Year	Apps	Goals
Haiti	2022	2	0
Haiti	2023	6	0
Haiti	2024	3	0
Haiti	2025	2	0
Haiti	2026	6	0
Total		19	0
