= Dimitri Liénard =

French footballer (born 1988)

Personal information
- Date of birth: 13 February 1988 (age 38)
- Place of birth: Belfort, France
- Height: 1.81 m (5 ft 11 in)
- Positions: Midfielder; winger

Senior career*
Years	Team	Apps	(Gls)
2009–2012	Belfort	89	(14)
2012–2013	Mulhouse	34	(7)
2013–2023	Strasbourg	167	(24)
2019	Strasbourg II	3	(0)
2023	Bastia	13	(2)
2024–2025	Sochaux	24	(0)
- * Club domestic league appearances and goals as of 26 May 2025

Dimitri Liénard (born 13 February 1988) is a French former professional footballer who played as a midfielder or as a winger.

== Club career ==
Liénard's contract with Bastia was terminated by mutual consent on 15 November 2023.

In January 2024, Liénard joined Championnat National club Sochaux on a one-and-a-half-year deal.
