= 2024–25 AJ Auxerre season =

AJ Auxerre
2024–25 season
- Manager: Christophe Pélissier
- Stadium: Stade de l'Abbé-Deschamps
- Ligue 1: 11th
- Coupe de France: Round of 64
- Top goalscorer: League: Gaëtan Perrin; Hamed Traorè (10 each); All: Gaëtan Perrin; Hamed Traorè (10 each)
- Highest home attendance: 17,052 v Lens (14 Dec 2024, Ligue 1)
- Lowest home attendance: 8,189 v Dunkerque (22 Dec 2024, Coupe de France)
- Average home league attendance: 16,634
- Biggest win: 4–0 v Rennes (Home, 3 Nov 2024, Ligue 1)
- Biggest defeat: 0–3 v Monaco (Home, 14 Sept 2024, Ligue 1)
Home colours	Away colours	Third colours
- All statistics correct as of 17 May 2025.

The 2024–25 season was the 120th season in the history of AJ Auxerre. In addition to the domestic league, the team participated in the Coupe de France.

== Summary ==
On 27 June 2024, the club released a pre-season schedule that included an official friendly match on 19 July against Championnat National club US Orléans followed by a friendly match on 27 against Ligue 2 club Grenoble Foot. Four days later, the Burgundy club faces ES Troyes AC, which was recently relegated to the third division. The fourth friendly match will be against Red Star F.C., which recently joined the ranks of the second division. Auxerre concludes the pre-season with a match against host Stade de Reims on 10 August. On July 11, Auxerre brought defender Gabriel Osho for free after the end of his contract with English club Luton Town.

== Players ==
=== First-team squad ===
As of 30 August 2024

Note: Flags indicate national team as defined under FIFA eligibility rules; some limited exceptions apply. Players may hold more than one non-FIFA nationality.

No.	Pos.	Nation	Player
3	DF	NGR	Gabriel Osho
4	DF	BRA	Jubal (captain)
5	DF	FRA	Théo Pellenard
6	DF	MAR	Saad Agouzoul
8	MF	FRA	Nathan Buayi-Kiala
9	FW	CAN	Theo Bair
10	FW	FRA	Gaëtan Perrin
11	FW	NED	Eros Maddy
14	DF	GHA	Gideon Mensah
16	GK	GUF	Donovan Léon
17	FW	MLI	Lassine Sinayoko
18	MF	SEN	Assane Dioussé
19	FW	FRA	Florian Ayé
20	DF	CIV	Sinaly Diomandé

No.	Pos.	Nation	Player
21	MF	CIV	Lasso Coulibaly
23	DF	NED	Ki-Jana Hoever (on loan from Wolverhampton Wanderers)
24	DF	CIV	Ange-Loïc N'Gatta
25	MF	CIV	Hamed Traorè (on loan from Bournemouth)
26	DF	FRA	Paul Joly
27	MF	FRA	Kévin Danois
30	GK	FRA	Tom Negrel
37	GK	FRA	Raphaël Adicéam
40	GK	FRA	Théo De Percin
42	MF	GHA	Elisha Owusu
45	FW	JPN	Ado Onaiwu
92	DF	CIV	Clément Akpa
97	MF	MAD	Rayan Raveloson

=== Out on loan ===
Note: Flags indicate national team as defined under FIFA eligibility rules; some limited exceptions apply. Players may hold more than one non-FIFA nationality.

No.	Pos.	Nation	Player
—	FW	GUI	Ousmane Camara (at Annecy until 30 June 2024)

== Transfers ==
=== In ===
Pos.	Player	Transferred from	Fee	Date	Source
MF	(Ivory Coast) Lasso Coulibaly	(Denmark) FC Nordsjælland	€2m	1 July 2024	
DF	(Nigeria) Gabriel Osho	(England) Luton Town	Free	11 July 2024	

== Friendlies ==
=== Pre-season ===
19 July 2024 Friendly	Orléans (France)	1–1	(France) Auxerre	Orléans
18:00				Stadium: Stade de la Source

27 July 2024 Friendly	Grenoble (France)	3–0	(France) Auxerre	Chambon-sur-Lignon
17:00	14'; 54'; 120'
Note: Two periods of 60 minutes

31 July 2024 Friendly	Auxerre (France)	2–1	(France) Troyes	Migennes
18:00

3 August 2024 Friendly	Auxerre (France)	2–0	(France) Red Star
18:00	Perrin 65'; Viadère 71'

== Competitions ==
=== Overall record ===
Competition	First match	Last match	Starting round	Final position	Record							
Competition	First match	Last match	Starting round	Final position	Pld	W	D	L	GF	GA	GD	Win %
Ligue 1	18 August 2024	17 May 2025	Matchday 1	11	34	11	9	14	48	51	−3	32.35
Coupe de France	21 December 2024		Round of 64	Round of 64	1	0	0	1	0	1	−1	0.00
Total					35	11	9	15	48	52	−4	31.43

Last updated: 11 May 2025
Source: Soccerway

=== Ligue 1 ===
==== League table ====
Pos	Team	Pld	W	D	L	GF	GA	GD	Pts
9	Brest	34	15	5	14	52	59	−7	50
10	Toulouse	34	11	9	14	44	43	+1	42
11	Auxerre	34	11	9	14	48	51	−3	42
12	Rennes	34	13	2	19	51	50	+1	41
13	Nantes	34	8	12	14	39	52	−13	36

Source: Ligue 1
Rules for classification: 1) Points; 2) Goal difference; 3) Head-to-head points; 4) Head-to-head goal difference; 5) Head-to-head goals scored; 6) Head-to-head away goals scored; 7) Goals scored; 8) Away goals scored; 9) Fair-play points (Note: Head-to-head record is used only after all the matches between the teams in question have been played).

==== Results summary ====
Overall								Home						Away					
Pld	W	D	L	GF	GA	GD	Pts	W	D	L	GF	GA	GD	W	D	L	GF	GA	GD
33	11	9	13	47	48	−1	42	7	6	4	24	17	+7	4	3	9	23	31	−8

Last updated: 11 May 2025.
Source: Ligue 1

==== Results by round ====
Round	1	2	3	4	5	6	7	8	9	10	11	12	13	14	15	16	17	18	19	20	21	22	23	24	25	26	27	28	29	30	31	32	33	34
Ground	H	A	A	H	A	H	A	H	A	H	A	H	A	H	H	A	H	A	H	A	H	A	H	H	A	A	H	A	H	A	A	H	H	A
Result	W	L	L	L	L	W	L	W	D	W	W	W	L	D	D	L	D	L	D	L	D	D	W	L	W	D	W	W	L	L	W	L	D	
Position	5	10	13	15	16	12	14	12	13	10	9	7	8	8	8	9	10	11	11	11	11	12	11	12	11	11	10	10	10	11	10	10	10	

Updated to match(es) played on 11 May 2025. Source: Ligue 1
A = Away; H = Home; W = Win; D = Draw; L = Loss

==== Matches ====
The league schedule was released on 21 June 2024.

18 August 2024 1	Auxerre	2–1	Nice	Auxerre
15:00	Raveloson 44'; Coulibaly 90+4'	Report	Cho 21'	Stadium: Stade de l'Abbé-Deschamps; Attendance: 16,354; Referee: Romain Lissorgue

18 August 2024 2	Nantes	2–0	Auxerre	Nantes
15:00	Simon 14'; Zézé (yellow card) 63'; Douglas Augusto (yellow card) 79'; Guirassy 90+6'	Report	Raveloson (yellow card) 20'; Onaiwu (red card) 54'	Stadium: Stade de la Beaujoire; Attendance: 31,077; Referee: Gaël Angoula

1 September 2024 3	Le Havre	3–1	Auxerre	Le Havre
17:00	Owusu 23' (o.g.); Ndiaye 52'; Casimir (yellow card) 81'; Touré 90+8' (pen.)	Report	Joly (yellow card) 11'; Hoever (yellow card) 14' (yellow-red card) 45'; Perrin 17'; Sinayoko (yellow card) 28'; Jubal (yellow card) 89'	Stadium: Stade Océane; Attendance: 19,715; Referee: Marc Bollengier

14 September 2024 4	Auxerre	0–3	Monaco	Auxerre
	Osho (yellow card) 13'; Owusu (yellow card) 43'; Jubal (yellow card) 45+1'	Report	Kehrer 8'; Vanderson 25'; Zakaria 89'	Stadium: Stade de l'Abbé-Deschamps; Attendance: 17,045; Referee: Abdelatif Kherradji

22 September 2024 5	Montpellier	3–2	Auxerre	Montpellier
17:00 CEST (UTC+2)	Nzingoula (yellow card) 33'; Adams 65', 75', (yellow card) 76'; Bećir Omeragić (yellow card) 66'; Sagnan 71'	Report	Traorè 18'; Owusu (yellow card) 48'; Sinayoko (yellow card) 57'; Diomandé (yellow card) 61'; Perrin (yellow card) 66'; Onaiwu 72'	Stadium: Stade de la Mosson; Attendance: 11,643; Referee: Hakim Ben El Hadj

27 September 2024 6	Auxerre	3–0	Brest	Auxerre
19:00 CEST (UTC+2)	Akpa (yellow card) 16'; Owusu 26'; Jubal 37' (pen.); Diomandé (yellow card) 53'; Traorè 59'	Report		Stadium: Stade de l'Abbé-Deschamps; Attendance: 15,381; Referee: Jérémy Stinat

5 October 2024 7	Saint-Étienne	3–1	Auxerre	Saint-Étienne
	Davitashvili 15', 54', 86'; Nadé (yellow card) 47'; Ekwah (yellow card) 67'; Pétrot (yellow card) 79'	Report	Owusu (yellow card) 35'; Bair 74'	Stadium: Stade Geoffroy-Guichard; Attendance: 31,445; Referee: Mathieu Vernice

20 October 2024 8	Auxerre	2–1	Reims	Auxerre
17:00	Diomandé 16'; Traorè (yellow card) 23', (goal) 52'; Jubal (penalty missed) 36'; Akpa (yellow card) 90+5'	Report	Atangana (yellow card) 1'; Buta (yellow card) 56'; Nakamura 90+5'; Munetsi (yellow card) 90+5'	Stadium: Stade de l'Abbé-Deschamps; Attendance: 17,016; Referee: Florent Batta

27 October 2024 9	Lyon	2–2	Auxerre	Décines-Charpieu
15:00	Mikautadze 45+5' (pen.), 62'	Report	Diomandé (yellow card) 44', (goal) 47'; Jubal (yellow card) 45+7'; Traorè 72'; Léon (yellow card) 80'; Raveloson (yellow card) 90+3'	Stadium: Parc Olympique Lyonnais; Attendance: 54,868; Referee: Jérémy Stinat

3 November 2024 10	Auxerre	4–0	Rennes	Auxerre
17:00 CET (UTC+1)	Perrin 27', 39'; Sinayoko 65' (pen.); Onaiwu 90+2'	Report	Matusiwa (yellow card) 35'; Faye (yellow card) 64'	Stadium: Stade de l'Abbé-Deschamps; Attendance: 16,366; Referee: Gaël Angoula

8 November 2024 11	Marseille	1–3	Auxerre	Marseille
20:45 CET (UTC+1)	Rabiot (yellow card) 60'; Greenwood 65' (pen.), (yellow card) 66'; Wahi (yellow card) 87'	Report	Sinayoko 10'; Perrin 43'; Traorè 45'; Léon (yellow card) 66'; Blair (yellow card) 88'	Stadium: Stade Vélodrome; Attendance: 64,184; Referee: Marc Bollengier

24 November 2024 12	Auxerre	1–0	Angers	Auxerre
17:00 CET (UTC+1)	Owusu (yellow card) 26'; Mensah (yellow card) 50'; Raveloson (yellow card) 84'; Traorè 90+3' (pen.), (yellow card) 90+4'	Report	Arcus (yellow card) 33'	Stadium: Stade de l'Abbé-Deschamps; Attendance: 16,120; Referee: François Letexier

1 December 2024 13	Toulouse	1–0	Auxerre	Toulouse
17:00 CET (UTC+1)	King 32'; Sierro 39' (pen.)	Report		Stadium: Stadium de Toulouse; Attendance: 23,525; Referee: Hakim Ben El Hadj

6 December 2024 14	Auxerre	0–0	Paris Saint-Germain	Auxerre
21:00 CET (UTC+1)	Traorè (yellow card) 73'; Sinayoko (yellow card) 76'	Report	Pacho (yellow card) 85'	Stadium: Stade de l'Abbé-Deschamps; Attendance: 17,028; Referee: Jérémie Pignard

14 December 2024 15	Auxerre	2–2	Lens	Auxerre
19:00 CET (UTC+1)	Sinayoko (yellow card) 21'; Perrin 31'; Mensah (yellow card) 52'; Joly (yellow card) 64'; Osho 73'	Report	El Aynaoui 22', (yellow card) 51'; Nzola 45'	Stadium: Stade de l'Abbé-Deschamps; Attendance: 17,052; Referee: Jérémy Stinat

5 January 2025 16	Strasbourg	3–1	Auxerre	Strasbourg
19:00 CET (UTC+1)	Emegha (yellow card) 45+1', (goal) 87'; Diarra 45+4' (pen.); Lemaréchal 59'	Report	Traorè 14'; Jubal (yellow card) 45+1'; Akpa (yellow card) 51'	Stadium: Stade de la Meinau; Attendance: 19,500; Referee: Florent Batta

10 January 2025 17	Auxerre	0–0	Lille	Auxerre
19:00 CET (UTC+1)	Joly (red card) 64'	Report	André (yellow card) 12'; David (yellow card) 15', (penalty missed) 58'; Gomes (yellow card) 55'; Alexsandro (yellow card) 90+8'	Stadium: Stade de l'Abbé-Deschamps; Attendance: 15,599; Referee: Gaël Angoula

19 January 2025 18	Angers	2–0	Auxerre	Angers
16:15 CET (UTC+1)	Biumla (yellow card) 14'; Diomandé 18' (o.g.); Lepaul 47'; Allevinah (yellow card) 60'	Report	Osho (red card) 22'; N'Gatta (yellow card) 90'	Stadium: Stade Raymond Kopa; Attendance: 9,938; Referee: Stéphanie Frappart

24 January 2025 19	Auxerre	1–1	Saint-Étienne	Auxerre
CET (UTC+1)	Traorè 27'; Jubal (yellow card) 68'; Massengo (yellow card) 84'	Report	Stassin 45'	Stadium: Stade de l'Abbé-Deschamps; Attendance: 16,805; Referee: Marc Bollengier

1 February 2025 20	Monaco	4–2	Auxerre	Monaco
19:00 CET (UTC+1)	Kehrer 35'; Zakaria (yellow card) 45+4'; Biereth 57', 63', 65'; Magassa (yellow card) 82'	Report	Joly (yellow card) 30'; Diomandé 38'; Jubal 45+7' (pen.); Owusu (yellow card) 71'	Stadium: Stade Louis II; Attendance: 5,336; Referee: Abdelatif Kherradji

9 February 2025 21	Auxerre	2–2	Toulouse	Auxerre
17:15 CET (UTC+1)	Jubal 62'; Traorè 73' (yellow card) 74'	Report	Cresswell 68'; Magri (yellow card) 88'; Edjouma 89'	Stadium: Stade de l'Abbé-Deschamps; Attendance: 15,801; Referee: Jérôme Brisard

14 February 2025 22	Brest	2–2	Auxerre	Brest
17:00 CET (UTC+1)	Baldé (yellow card) 25'; Ndiaye 60', (yellow card) 71'; Ajorque 79'	Report	Perrin 18', 74'; Akpa (yellow card) 30'; Dioussé (yellow card) 90+2'	Stadium: Stade Francis-Le Blé; Attendance: 12,525; Referee: Bastien Dechepy

22 February 2025 23	Auxerre	3–0	Marseille	Auxerre
21:05 CET (UTC+1)	Perrin 34'; Hoever (yellow card) 59'; Jubal 77' (pen.), 90+1'	Report	Cornelius (yellow card) 38' (yellow-red card) 63'; Rulli (yellow card) 75'	Stadium: Stade de l'Abbé-Deschamps; Attendance: 17,183; Referee: Jérémy Stinat

2 March 2024 24	Auxerre	0–1	Strasbourg	Auxerre
17:15 CEST (UTC+2)	Akpa (yellow card) 63'	Report	Barco (yellow card) 17'; Emegha 47'; Bakwa (yellow card) 76'; Petrović (yellow card) 90+4'; Sylla (red card) 90+6'	Stadium: Stade de l'Abbé-Deschamps; Attendance: 16,495; Referee: Mathieu Vernice

9 March 2025 25	Reims	0–2	Auxerre	Reims
18:15 CET (UTC+1)	Akieme (yellow card) 67'	Report	Bair 15'; Traorè 24', (yellow card) 31'	Stadium: Stade Auguste-Delaune; Attendance: 15,474; Referee: Romain Lissorgue

14 March 2025 26	Nice	1–1	Auxerre	Nice
20:45 CET (UTC+1)	Guessand 37'; Rosario (yellow card) 81'; Bard (red card) 87'	Report	Danois (yellow card) 29'; Owusu (yellow card) 71'; Massengo (yellow card) 86'; Ayé 90+4'	Stadium: Allianz Riviera; Attendance: 18,640; Referee: Abdelatif Kherradji

30 March 2025 27	Auxerre	1–0	Montpellier	Auxerre
17:15 CET (UTC+1)	Owusu (yellow card) 18'; Akpa (yellow card) 35'; Massengo (yellow card) 78'; Ayé 82'	Report	Meïté (yellow card) 47'	Stadium: Stade de l'Abbé-Deschamps; Attendance: 16,558; Referee: Marc Bollengier

6 April 2025 28	Rennes	0–1	Auxerre	Rennes
17:15 CET (UTC+1)		Report	Jubal 89'	Stadium: Roazhon Park; Attendance: 28268; Referee: Florent Batta

13 April 2025 29	Auxerre	1–3	Lyon	Auxerre
20:45 CEST (UTC+2)	Diomandé (yellow card) 2'; Léon (yellow card) 52'; Sinayoko 77'; Matondo (yellow card) 88'	Report	Mikautadze 54' (pen.); Almada (yellow card) 58'; Cherki 62'; Lacazette 84'	Stadium: Stade de l'Abbé-Deschamps; Attendance: 17,511; Referee: Stéphanie Frappart

20 April 2025 30	Lille	3–1	Auxerre	Villeneuve-d'Ascq
15:00 CEST (UTC+2)	Meunier 9'; Diakité (yellow card) 22'; David 43', 90+7'	Report	Jubal (yellow card) 47'; Massengo (yellow card) 61'; Alexsandro 90+2' (o.g.)	Stadium: Stade Pierre-Mauroy; Attendance: 45,929; Referee: Thomas Léonard

27 April 2025 31	Lens	0–4	Auxerre	Lens
17:15 CEST (UTC+2)	Bah 43'; Agbonifo (yellow card) 55'; Thomasson (yellow card) 75'; Aguilar (yellow card) 81'; Sotoca (red card) 85'	Report	Onaiwu 33', 44', (yellow card) 45'; Perrin 40'; Massengo (yellow card) 50'; Léon (yellow card) 52'; Hoever 73'; Maddy (yellow card) 90+1'	Stadium: Stade Bollaert-Delelis; Attendance: 38,193; Referee: Mathieu Vernice

4 May 2025 32	Auxerre	1–2	Le Havre	Auxerre
15:15 CEST (UTC+2)	Akpa (yellow card) 27'; Sinayoko 62'; Hoever (yellow card) 75'	Report	Jubal 79' (o.g.); Casimir (yellow card) 84'; Sangante 90+2'	Stadium: Stade de l'Abbé-Deschamps; Attendance: 17,194; Referee: Jérémie Pignard

10 May 2025 33	Auxerre	1–1	Nantes	Auxerre
21:00 CEST (UTC+2)	Perrin 45'; Sinayoko (yellow card) 71'; Jubal (yellow card) 80'; Diomandé (yellow card) 88'	Report	Zézé (yellow card) 56'; Leroux 62'	Stadium: Stade de l'Abbé-Deschamps; Attendance: 17,277; Referee: Marc Bollengier

17 May 2025 34	Paris Saint-Germain	v	Auxerre	Paris
21:00 CEST (UTC+2)		Report		Stadium: Parc des Princes

=== Coupe de France ===
22 December 2024 Round of 64	Auxerre	0–1	Dunkerque	Auxerre
14:45 CET (UTC+1)	Raveloson (yellow card) 45'	Report	Bardeli 26'; Sekongo (yellow card) 90'	Stadium: Stade de l'Abbé Deschamps; Attendance: 8,189; Referee: Romain Lissorgue

== Statistics ==
=== Goalscorers ===
As of match played 24 January 2025

Place	Position	Nation	Number	Name	Ligue 1	Coupe de France	Total
1	MF	(Ivory Coast)	25	Hamed Traorè	8	0	8
2	FW	(France)	10	Gaëtan Perrin	5	0	5
3	DF	(Ivory Coast)	20	Sinaly Diomandé	2	0	2
3	FW	(Japan)	45	Ado Onaiwu	2	0	2
3	FW	(Mali)	17	Lassine Sinayoko	2	0	2
6	FW	(Canada)	9	Theo Bair	1	0	1
6	MF	(Ivory Coast)	21	Lasso Coulibaly	1	0	1
6	DF	(Brazil)	4	Jubal	1	0	1
6	DF	(Nigeria)	3	Gabriel Osho	1	0	1
6	MF	(Ghana)	42	Elisha Owusu	1	0	1
6	MF	(Madagascar)	97	Rayan Raveloson	1	0	1
				TOTALS	25	0	25
