= Junior Mwanga =

French footballer (born 2003)

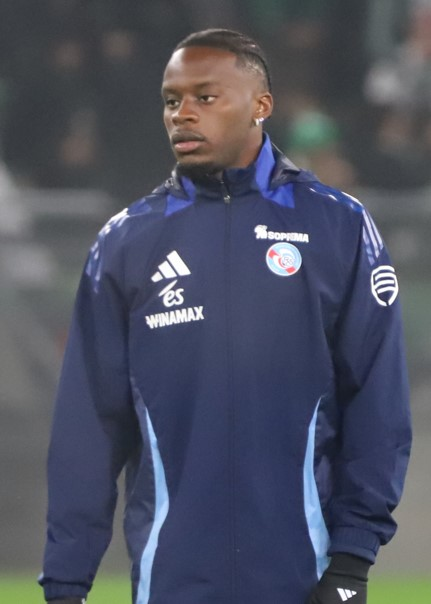
- Mwanga with Strasbourg in 2024

Personal information
- Date of birth: 11 May 2003 (age 23)
- Place of birth: Lyon, France
- Height: 1.84 m (6 ft 0 in)
- Position: Centre-back

Team information
- Current team: Le Havre
- Number: 6

Youth career
- FC Lyon

Senior career*
Years	Team	Apps	(Gls)
2020–2023	Bordeaux B	23	(5)
2022–2023	Bordeaux	34	(0)
2023	Strasbourg B	1	(0)
2023–2026	Strasbourg	35	(1)
2025	→ Le Havre (loan)	11	(1)
2025–2026	→ Nantes (loan)	18	(1)
2026–	Le Havre	6	(0)

International career^{‡}
2022–2023	France U20	6	(1)
- * Club domestic league appearances and goals as of 18 October 2026 ‡ National team caps and goals as of 28 March 2023

Junior Mwanga (born 11 May 2003) is a French professional footballer who plays as centre-back for Ligue 1 club Le Havre.

== Career ==
Mwanga is a youth product of FC Lyon, he moved to the reserves of Bordeaux on 6 July 2020. He made his professional debut with Bordeaux in a 4–2 Ligue 1 win to Brest on 21 May 2022, the last matchday of the 2021–22 season. On 3 August 2022, Mwanga signed his first professional contract with the club tying him until 2025, He also signed for Strasbourg.

On 31 January 2025, Mwanga moved on loan to Le Havre. On 1 September 2025, he was loaned out to Nantes.

On 29 July 2026, Mwanga returned to Le Havre with a four-year contract.

== Personal life ==
Born in France, Mwanga is of DR Congolese descent. Mwanga's half-brother, Thomas Oualenbo, is a semi-pro footballer in France.

== Career statistics ==
As of match played 18 October 2026

Appearances and goals by club, season and competition
Club	Season	League			National cup		Europe		Other		Total	
Club	Season	Division	Apps	Goals	Apps	Goals	Apps	Goals	Apps	Goals	Apps	Goals
Bordeaux B	2020–21	Championnat National 1	1	0	—		—		—		1	0
Bordeaux B	2021–22	Championnat National 1	22	5	—		—		—		22	5
Bordeaux B	Total		23	5	—		—		—		23	5
Bordeaux	2021–22	Ligue 1	1	0	0	0	—		—		1	0
Bordeaux	2022–23	Ligue 2	33	0	2	0	—		—		35	0
Bordeaux	Total		34	0	2	0	—		—		36	0
Strasbourg B	2023–24	Championnat National 2	1	0	—		—		—		1	0
Strasbourg	2023–24	Ligue 1	22	1	2	0	—		—		24	1
Strasbourg	2024–25	Ligue 1	8	0	1	0	—		—		9	0
Strasbourg	2025–26	Ligue 1	3	0	0	0	1 (Note: Appearances in UEFA Conference League)	0	—		4	0
Strasbourg	Total		33	1	3	0	1	0	—		37	1
Le Havre (loan)	2024–25	Ligue 1	11	1	—		—		—		11	1
Nantes (loan)	2025–26	Ligue 1	18	1	3	0	—		—		21	1
Le Havre	2026–27	Ligue 1	6	0	0	0	—		—		6	0
Career total			126	8	8	0	1	0	0	0	135	8
