= Jérémy Sebas =

Martiniquais footballer (born 2003)

Personal information
- Date of birth: 14 April 2003 (age 23)
- Place of birth: Sainte-Anne, Martinique
- Height: 1.87 m (6 ft 2 in)
- Position: Forward

Team information
- Current team: Pau (on loan from Bastia)
- Number: 18

Youth career
- 2013–2020: US Marinoise
- 2020–2021: CERFA Les Abymes

Senior career*
Years	Team	Apps	(Gls)
2021–2022	Olympique le Marin	18	(10)
2022–2023	Strasbourg II	38	(11)
2023–2025	Strasbourg	27	(2)
2025	→ Bastia (loan)	13	(1)
2025–	Bastia	29	(4)
2026–	→ Pau (loan)	0	(0)

International career
2022–	Martinique	5	(0)
- * Club domestic league appearances and goals as of 4 September 2026

Jérémy Sebas (born 14 April 2003) is a Martiniquais professional footballer who plays as a forward for Ligue 2 club Pau on loan from Bastia, and the Martinique national team.

== Club career ==
Sebas is a youth product of US Marinoise, and finished his development in the academy of the Guadeloupean club CERFA Les Abymes in 2020. He began his senior career with Olympique le Marin in the Martinique Championnat National in 2021. On 21 June 2022, he transferred to the French mainland club Strasbourg on a 1-year youth contract, originally assigned to their reserves. In June 2023, he signed a professional contract with Strasbourg, extending his stay. He made his professional debut with Strasbourg as a substitute in a 0–0 tie with Clermont on 5 November 2023.

On 3 February 2025, Sebas joined Bastia in Ligue 2 on loan until the end of the season.

On 18 June 2025, Sebas signed a 4-year contract with Bastia in Ligue 2.

== International career ==
Sebas made his international debut with the Martinique national team in a 3–1 friendly win over Barbados on 22 February 2022.

== Career statistics ==
=== Club ===
As of match played 2 February 2025

Appearances and goals by club, season and competition
Club	Season	League			National cup		Continental		Other		Total	
Club	Season	Division	Apps	Goals	Apps	Goals	Apps	Goals	Apps	Goals	Apps	Goals
Olympique le Marin	2021–22	Martinique Championnat National	18	9	—		—		—		18	9
Strasbourg II	2022–23	National 3	25	4	—		—		—		25	4
Strasbourg II	2023–24	National 3	8	5	—		—		—		8	5
Strasbourg II	Total		33	9	—		—		—		33	9
Strasbourg	2023–24	Ligue 1	14	2	1	0	—		—		15	2
Strasbourg	2024–25	Ligue 1	13	0	1	0	—		—		14	0
Strasbourg	Total		27	2	2	0	—		—		29	2
Career total			78	20	2	0	0	0	0	0	80	20

=== International ===
As of match played 13 June 2022

Appearances and goals by national team and year
National team	Year	Apps	Goals
Martinique	2022	5	0
Total		5	0
