= Alaa Bellaarouch =

Moroccan footballer (born 2002)

Personal information
- Date of birth: 1 February 2002 (age 24)
- Place of birth: Casablanca, Morocco
- Height: 1.89 m (6 ft 2 in)
- Position: Goalkeeper

Team information
- Current team: Dinamo București (on loan from Braga)
- Number: 36

Youth career
- –2020: Mohammed VI Academy
- 2020–2021: Strasbourg

Senior career*
Years	Team	Apps	(Gls)
2020–2025	Strasbourg B	21	(0)
2022–2025	Strasbourg	15	(0)
2022–2023	→ Stade Briochin (loan)	14	(0)
2022	→ Stade Briochin B (loan)	1	(0)
2025–	Braga	0	(0)
2026–	→ Dinamo București (loan)	15	(0)

International career
2017	Morocco U15	5	(0)
2018–2019	Morocco U17	4	(0)
2021–2022	Morocco U20	7	(0)
2023	Morocco U23	10	(0)
Medal record
Representing Morocco
U-23 Africa Cup of Nations
Winner	2023 Morocco
- * Club domestic league appearances and goals as of 6 November 2026

Alaa Bellaarouch (Arabic: علاء بلعروش; born 1 February 2002) is a Moroccan professional footballer who plays as a goalkeeper for Liga I club Dinamo București, on loan from Primeira Liga club Braga and the Morocco national team.

== Club career ==
Bellaarouch was trained at the Mohammed VI Football Academy in Salé. In 2020, he left Morocco to sign for French club Strasbourg, initially joining the reserve team. In 2022, he signed for Stade Briochin on loan until the end of the season.

On 2 February 2024, Bellaarouch made his Ligue 1 debut for Strasbourg in a 2–1 defeat at home to Paris Saint-Germain. Although he saved a penalty from Kylian Mbappé early in the match, he later made a crucial mistake by clearing the ball into Marco Asensio's path, who set up Mbappé for the opening goal.

On 27 June 2025, Bellaarouch signed a 5-year contract with Primeira Liga club Braga.

On 26 June 2026, Bellaarouch signed a 1-year loan contract with Liga I club Dinamo București.

== International career ==
Bellaarouch is a Morocco youth international. He was a part of the teams won the 2018 UNAF U-17 Tournament and the 2023 U-23 Africa Cup of Nations.

Bellaarouch was one of the players who were called up with the Morocco national team by head coach Mohamed Ouahbi for the 2027 Africa Cup of Nations qualification matches with Gabon and Lesotho

== Career statistics ==
As of match played 6 November 2026

Appearances and goals by club, season, and competition
Club	Season	League			National cup (Note: Includes Coupe de France, Taça de Portugal)		Europe		Other		Total	
Club	Season	Division	Apps	Goals	Apps	Goals	Apps	Goals	Apps	Goals	Apps	Goals
Strasbourg B	2020–21	Championnat National 3	1	0	–		—		—		1	0
Strasbourg B	2021–22	Championnat National 3	17	0	—		—		—		17	0
Strasbourg B	2024–25	Championnat National 2	3	0	—		—		—		3	0
Strasbourg B	Total		21	0	—		—		—		21	0
Strasbourg	2021–22	Ligue 1	0	0	0	0	—		—		0	0
Strasbourg	2023–24	Ligue 1	15	0	4	0	—		—		19	0
Strasbourg	2024–25	Ligue 1	0	0	0	0	—		—		0	0
Strasbourg	Total		15	0	4	0	—		—		19	0
Stade Briochin (loan)	2022–23	Championnat National	14	0	0	0	—		—		14	0
Stade Briochin B (loan)	2022–23	Championnat National 3	1	0	—		—		—		1	0
Braga	2025–26	Primeira Liga	0	0	1	0	1 (Note: Appearance in UEFA Europa League)	0	0	0	2	0
Dinamo București (loan)	2026–27	Liga I	15	0	0	0	—		—		15	0
Career total			66	0	5	0	1	0	0	0	72	0

== Honours ==
Braga

- Taça da Liga runner-up: 2025–26

Morocco U17

- UNAF U-17 Tournament: 2018

Morocco U23

- U-23 Africa Cup of Nations: 2023
