= 2023–24 RC Strasbourg Alsace season =

RC Strasbourg Alsace
2023–24 season
- President: Marc Keller
- Head coach: Patrick Vieira
- Stadium: Stade de la Meinau
- Ligue 1: 13th
- Coupe de France: Quarter-finals
- Top goalscorer: League: Emanuel Emegha (8); All: Emanuel Emegha (9)
Home colours	Away colours	Third colours

The 2023–24 season was Racing Club de Strasbourg Alsace's 118th season in existence and seventh consecutive season in Ligue 1. They also competed in the Coupe de France.

== Players ==
=== First-team squad ===
As of 1 February 2024

Note: Flags indicate national team as defined under FIFA eligibility rules; some limited exceptions apply. Players may hold more than one non-FIFA nationality.

No.	Pos.	Nation	Player
1	GK	FRA	Matthieu Dreyer
2	DF	FRA	Frédéric Guilbert
3	DF	FRA	Thomas Delaine
4	DF	POL	Karol Fila
5	DF	FRA	Lucas Perrin
6	MF	CIV	Jean-Eudes Aholou
7	MF	FRA	Jessy Deminguet
8	MF	BRA	Andrey Santos (on loan from Chelsea)
9	FW	FRA	Kevin Gameiro
10	FW	NED	Emanuel Emegha
11	FW	CIV	Moïse Sahi
12	FW	RSA	Lebo Mothiba
13	DF	GUI	Saïdou Sow

No.	Pos.	Nation	Player
14	MF	BIH	Sanjin Prcić
18	DF	FRA	Junior Mwanga
19	MF	FRA	Habib Diarra
23	FW	BRA	Ângelo (on loan from Chelsea)
24	DF	CIV	Abakar Sylla
25	DF	FRA	Steven Baseya
26	FW	FRA	Dilane Bakwa
27	MF	MLI	Ibrahima Sissoko
28	DF	FRA	Marvin Senaya
29	DF	FRA	Ismaël Doukouré
30	GK	HAI	Alexandre Pierre
36	GK	MAR	Alaa Bellaarouch
40	FW	MTQ	Jérémy Sebas

=== Out on loan ===
Note: Flags indicate national team as defined under FIFA eligibility rules; some limited exceptions apply. Players may hold more than one non-FIFA nationality.

No.	Pos.	Nation	Player
—	GK	FRA	Robin Risser (at Dijon until 30 June 2024)
—	DF	UKR	Eduard Sobol (at Genk until 30 June 2024)
—	MF	HAI	Fredler Christophe (at Châteauroux until 30 June 2024)
—	MF	HAI	Dany Jean (at Avranches until 30 June 2024)

No.	Pos.	Nation	Player
—	MF	MAR	Nordine Kandil (at Annecy until 30 June 2024)
—	FW	FRA	Lorenzo Depuidt (at Épinal until 30 June 2024)
—	FW	SRB	Miloš Luković (at FK IMT until 30 June 2024)

== Transfers ==
=== In ===
Pos.	Player	Transferred from	Fee	Date	Source
MF	(France) Jessy Deminguet	(France) Caen	Free	1 July 2023	
MF	(France) Steven Baseya	(France) Nancy	Free	1 July 2023	
DF	(Ivory Coast) Abakar Sylla	(Belgium) Club Brugge	€20,000,000	15 July 2023	
FW	(Netherlands) Emanuel Emegha	(Austria) Sturm Graz	€13,000,000	22 July 2023	
MF	(France) Junior Mwanga	(France) Bordeaux	€10,000,000	8 August 2023	
FW	(France) Dilane Bakwa	(France) Bordeaux	€10,000,000	8 August 2023	
FW	(Brazil) Ângelo Gabriel	(England) Chelsea	Loan	8 August 2023	
DF	(Guinea) Saïdou Sow	(France) Saint-Étienne	€3,000,000	9 August 2023	
MF	(Brazil) Andrey Santos	(England) Chelsea	Loan	1 February 2024	

=== Out ===
Pos.	Player	Transferred to	Fee	Date	Source
MF	(France) Dimitri Liénard	(France) Bastia	Free	4 July 2023	
DF	(Ghana) Alexander Djiku	(Turkey) Fenerbahçe	Free	10 July 2023	
FW	(Senegal) Habib Diallo	(Saudi Arabia) Al-Shabab	€18,000,000	14 August 2023	
MF	(France) Jean-Ricner Bellegarde	(England) Wolves	€15,000,000	1 September 2023	
GK	(Belgium) Matz Sels	(England) Nottingham Forest	€8,000,000	1 February 2024	

== Pre-season and friendlies ==
17 July 2023 Friendly	1899 Hoffenheim	1–2	Strasbourg	Kitzbühel
17:00 UTC+2	Vogt 61' (pen.)		Mothiba 7'; Deminguet (yellow card) 35'; Saettel 89'	Stadium: Sportplatz Langau

21 July 2023 Friendly	Beşiktaş	2–1	Strasbourg	Grödig, Austria
16:00 UTC+2	Aboubakar 10', 21'		Dion 25'	Stadium: Greisbergers Betten-Arena; Referee: Julian Weinberger

26 July 2023 Friendly	Strasbourg	3–0	Sturm Graz	Colmar
16:30 UTC+2	Diallo 6', 13', 37'			Stadium: Colmar Stadium

29 July 2023 Friendly	SC Freiburg	2–2	Strasbourg
16:00 UTC+2

29 July 2023 Friendly	SC Freiburg	2–2	Strasbourg
18:00 UTC+2

5 August 2023 Friendly	Strasbourg	3–3	Werder Bremen
15:30 UTC+2

5 August 2023 Friendly	Strasbourg	2–1	Werder Bremen	Strasbourg, France
18:30 UTC+2

== Competitions ==
=== Overall record ===
Competition	First match	Last match	Starting round	Final position	Record							
Competition	First match	Last match	Starting round	Final position	Pld	W	D	L	GF	GA	GD	Win %
Ligue 1	13 August 2023	19 May 2024	Matchday 1	13th	34	10	9	15	38	50	−12	29.41
Coupe de France	6 January 2024	27 February 2024	Round of 64	Quarter-finals	4	3	1	0	10	2	+8	75.00
Total					38	13	10	15	48	52	−4	34.21

Source: Soccerway

=== League table ===
Pos	Team	Pld	W	D	L	GF	GA	GD	Pts
11	Toulouse	34	11	10	13	42	46	−4	43
12	Montpellier (Note: Montpellier was deducted one point for uncontrolled crowd trouble that caused the abandonment of its match against Clermont.)	34	10	12	12	43	48	−5	41
13	Strasbourg	34	10	9	15	38	50	−12	39
14	Nantes	34	9	6	19	30	55	−25	33
15	Le Havre	34	7	11	16	34	45	−11	32

Source: Ligue 1
Rules for classification: 1) Points; 2) Goal difference; 3) Head-to-head points; 4) Head-to-head goal difference; 5) Head-to-head goals scored; 6) Head-to-head away goals scored; 7) Goals scored; 8) Away goals scored; 9) Fair-play points (Note: Head-to-head record is used only after all the matches between the teams in question have been played).

==== Results summary ====
Overall								Home						Away					
Pld	W	D	L	GF	GA	GD	Pts	W	D	L	GF	GA	GD	W	D	L	GF	GA	GD
34	10	9	15	38	50	−12	39	7	3	7	22	23	−1	3	6	8	16	27	−11

Source: Ligue 1

==== Results by round ====
Round	1	2	3	4	5	6	7	8	9	10	11	12	13	14	15	16	17	18	19	20	21	22	23	24	25	26	27	28	29	30	31	32	33	34
Ground	H	A	H	A	H	A	H	H	A	A	H	A	H	A	H	A	H	A	A	H	A	H	H	A	H	A	H	A	H	A	H	A	H	A
Result	W	L	W	L	D	W	L	L	L	D	D	D	D	L	W	W	W	D	D	L	L	L	L	D	L	W	W	D	W	L	L	L	W	L
Position	5	9	5	9	4	6	8	11	13	14	12	15	14	15	10	9	9	9	10	10	10	10	13	12	14	12	12	12	12	13	13	13	13	13

Source: Ligue 1
A = Away; H = Home; W = Win; D = Draw; L = Loss

==== Matches ====
The league fixtures were unveiled on 29 June 2023.

13 August 2023 1	Strasbourg	2–1	Lyon	Strasbourg
20:45 CEST (UTC+2)	Doukouré (yellow card) 8'; Bellegarde (yellow card) 45+5', (goal) 63'; Mothiba 75'	Report	Tolisso (yellow card) 45+4'; Kumbedi (yellow card) 62'; Tagliafico 88'	Stadium: Stade de la Meinau; Attendance: 25,410; Referee: Jérôme Brisard

20 August 2023 2	Monaco	3–0	Strasbourg	Fontvieille
19:00 CEST (UTC+2)	Minamino 20', 36'; Golovin (yellow card) 35'; Dallinga (yellow card) 43'; Camara (yellow card) 47'; Ben Yedder 58'	Report	Bellegarde (yellow card) 85'	Stadium: Stade Louis II; Attendance: 10,072; Referee: Ruddy Buquet
Note: The match was originally scheduled for 17:00 CEST, but was postponed by two hours due to the heat wave in Monaco.

27 August 2023 3	Strasbourg	2–0	Toulouse	Strasbourg
15:00 CEST (UTC+2)	Deminguet (yellow card) 43'; Emegha 52'; Bellegarde 89'	Report	Suazo (yellow card) 54'; Dallinga (yellow card) 68'; Chaïbi (yellow card) 81'	Stadium: Stade de la Meinau; Attendance: 25,090; Referee: Benoît Bastien

3 September 2023 4	Nice	2–0	Strasbourg	Nice
17:05 CEST (UTC+2)	Dante (yellow card) 5'; Atal 45+2'; Moffi 75'; Boudaoui (yellow card) 82'	Report	Sissoko (yellow card) 84'	Stadium: Allianz Riviera; Attendance: 20,215; Referee: Jérémy Stinat

17 September 2023 5	Strasbourg	2–2	Montpellier	Strasbourg
15:00 CEST (UTC+2)	Delaine (yellow card) 11'; Guilbert (yellow card) 45+6'; Lecomte 63' (o.g.); Mothiba 69'; Bakwa (yellow card) 76'; Emegha (yellow card) 90+7'	Report	Adams (yellow card) 29'; Khazri 35'; Nordin 40', (yellow card) 46'; Sylla (yellow card) 45+1'; Savanier (yellow card) 58'; Leroy (yellow card) 86'; Chotard (yellow card) 88'	Stadium: Stade de la Meinau; Attendance: 25,128; Referee: Pierre Gaillouste

24 September 2023 6	Metz	0–1	Strasbourg	Metz
13:00 CEST (UTC+2)	Kouao (yellow card) 22'; N'Doram (yellow card) 90+3'	Report	Diarra 83'	Stadium: Stade Saint-Symphorien; Attendance: 26,661; Referee: Clément Turpin

29 September 2023 7	Strasbourg	0–1	Lens	Strasbourg
21:00 CEST (UTC+2)	Emegha (yellow card) 64'; Doukouré (yellow card) 69'	Report	Wahi 16'; Gradit (yellow card) 33'; Medina (yellow card) 45+3'; Mendy (yellow card) 54'; El Aynaoui (yellow card) 90+1'	Stadium: Stade de la Meinau; Attendance: 26,001; Referee: Jérôme Brisard

6 October 2023 8	Strasbourg	1–2	Nantes	Strasbourg
21:00 CEST (UTC+2)	Mwanga (yellow card) 25'; Guilbert (yellow card) 33'; Ângelo (yellow card) 45'; Perrin (yellow card) 81'; Sahi 90+2'	Report	Duverne (yellow card) 45+2'; Coco 50'; Moutoussamy 58'	Stadium: Stade de la Meinau; Attendance: 25,274; Referee: Stéphanie Frappart

21 October 2023 9	Paris Saint-Germain	3–0	Strasbourg	Paris
17:00 CEST (UTC+2)	Mbappé 10' (pen.); Soler 31'; Fabián 77'; Lee (yellow card) 82'; Ndour (yellow card) 88'	Report		Stadium: Parc des Princes; Attendance: 41,261; Referee: Bastien Dechepy

29 October 2023 10	Rennes	1–1	Strasbourg	Rennes
17:05 CET (UTC+1)	Truffert 23'; Matić (yellow card) 45'; Assignon (yellow card) 61'	Report	Nyamsi (yellow card) 5'; Sels (yellow card) 23'; Mothiba 81'	Stadium: Roazhon Park; Attendance: 28,100; Referee: Florent Batta

5 November 2023 11	Strasbourg	0–0	Clermont	Strasbourg
15:00 CET (UTC+1)	Senaya (yellow card) 51', (red card) 76'	Report		Stadium: Stade de la Meinau; Attendance: 25,039; Referee: Jérémy Stinat

25 November 2023 13	Strasbourg	1–1	Marseille	Strasbourg
21:00 CET (UTC+1)	Emegha 6'; Bakwa (yellow card) 89'	Report	Clauss 27'; Lodi (yellow card) 54'; Veretout (yellow card) 90+1'	Stadium: Stade de la Meinau; Attendance: 25,443; Referee: Jérôme Brisard

1 December 2023 14	Reims	2–1	Strasbourg	Reims
21:00 CET (UTC+1)	Richardson 10'; Perrin 42' (o.g.); De Smet (yellow card) 86'	Report	Gameiro 88' (pen.); Sylla (yellow card) 90+3'	Stadium: Stade Auguste-Delaune; Attendance: 13,704; Referee: Hakim Ben El Hadj

7 December 2023 12	Brest	1–1	Strasbourg	Brest
20:30 CET (UTC+1)	Magnetti (yellow card) 35'; Le Douaron 44'	Report	Emegha 80'	Stadium: Stade Francis-Le Blé; Attendance: 14,569; Referee: Jérémie Pignard
Note: The match was originally scheduled for 12 November 2023, but was postponed due to damage caused by Storm Ciarán.

10 December 2023 15	Strasbourg	2–1	Le Havre	Strasbourg
15:00 CET (UTC+1)	Emegha 21'; Sissoko (yellow card) 26'; Perrin (yellow card) 40'; Delaine (yellow card) 73'; Sylla 90+7'	Report	Salmier (yellow card) 27', (goal) 49'	Stadium: Stade de la Meinau; Attendance: 25,173; Referee: Benoît Millot

17 December 2023 16	Lorient	1–2	Strasbourg	Lorient
15:00 CET (UTC+1)	Dieng (yellow card) 32', (goal) 53'; B. Mendy (yellow card) 71'; Touré (yellow card) 90+2'	Report	Bakwa 14'; Gameiro 49'; Perrin (yellow card) 66'; Sels (yellow card) 71'	Stadium: Stade du Moustoir; Attendance: 14,580; Referee: Bastien Dechepy

20 December 2023 17	Strasbourg	2–1	Lille	Strasbourg
21:00 CET (UTC+1)	Yoro 41' (o.g.); Sylla (yellow card) 45'; Mwanga 76'	Report	Sylla 20' (o.g.); André (yellow card) 32'; Zhegrova (yellow card) 62'	Stadium: Stade de la Meinau; Attendance: 25,373; Referee: Clément Turpin

12 January 2024 18	Marseille	1–1	Strasbourg	Marseille
21:00 CET (UTC+1)	Gigot 3', (yellow card) 90+5'; Meïté (yellow card) 34'; Nadir (yellow card) 84'	Report	Senaya (yellow card) 77'; Sebas 90+2'; Doukouré (yellow card) 90+5'	Stadium: Stade Vélodrome; Attendance: 53,616; Referee: Marc Bollengier

28 January 2024 19	Clermont	1–1	Strasbourg	Clermont-Ferrand
15:00 CET (UTC+1)	Borges (yellow card) 36'; Nicholson 52'	Report	Sahi 34'; Sissoko (yellow card) 59'; Delaine (yellow card) 81'; Bakwa (yellow card) 90+8'	Stadium: Stade Gabriel-Montpied; Attendance: 9,047; Referee: Benoît Millot

2 February 2024 20	Strasbourg	1–2	Paris Saint-Germain	Strasbourg
21:00 CET (UTC+1)	Sissoko (yellow card) 27'; Mwanga (yellow card) 54'; Senaya (yellow card) 63'; Bakwa 68'	Report	K. Mbappé (penalty missed) 6', 31'; Hernandez (yellow card) 30'; Asensio 49'	Stadium: Stade de la Meinau; Attendance: 25,834; Referee: Ruddy Buquet

10 February 2024 21	Lens	3–1	Strasbourg	Lens
17:00 CET (UTC+1)	Wahi 16'; Costa 30', (yellow card) 61'; Medina (yellow card) 37'; Sotoca 58'	Report	Delaine 43', (yellow card) 68'	Stadium: Stade Bollaert-Delelis; Attendance: 38,161; Referee: Willy Delajod

18 February 2024 22	Strasbourg	1–3	Lorient	Strasbourg
13:00 CET (UTC+1)	Diarra (yellow card) 26'; Guilbert 51'; Mwanga (yellow card) 67'; Ângelo (yellow card) 86'; Bakwa (red card) 90+4'	Report	Bamba 2', 45+3'; Ponceau 49'; Touré (yellow card) 86'	Stadium: Stade de la Meinau; Attendance: 25,103; Referee: Thomas Léonard

24 February 2024 23	Strasbourg	0–3	Brest	Strasbourg
21:00 CET (UTC+1)	Guilbert (yellow card) 69'; Nzingoula (yellow card) 90+1'; Andrey Santos (yellow card) 90+2'	Report	Camara 33', 40', 60' (pen.)	Stadium: Stade de la Meinau; Attendance: 25,140; Referee: Jérôme Brisard

3 March 2024 24	Montpellier	2–2	Strasbourg	Montpellier
15:00 CET (UTC+1)	Ferri (yellow card) 19'; Doukouré 71' (o.g.); Nordin 87'	Report	Sissoko (yellow card) 34'; Diarra 47' (pen.), (yellow card) 66'; Emegha (yellow card) 83', (goal) 83'	Stadium: Stade de la Mosson; Attendance: 11,635; Referee: Stéphanie Frappart

10 March 2024 25	Strasbourg	0–1	Monaco	Strasbourg
15:00 CET (UTC+1)	Doukouré (yellow card) 74'	Report	Minamino (yellow card) 5'; Singo (yellow card) 44'; Ben Seghir 72'; Golovin (yellow card) 82'	Stadium: Stade de la Meinau; Attendance: 25,391; Referee: Clément Turpin

16 March 2024 26	Nantes	1–3	Strasbourg	Nantes
17:00 CET (UTC+1)	Zézé (yellow card) 33'; Cömert 36', (yellow card) 90+2'	Report	Gameiro 3'; Senaya (yellow card) 18'; Sow (yellow card) 35'; Emegha 62', 78'; Bakwa (yellow card) 83'	Stadium: Stade de la Beaujoire; Attendance: 29,487; Referee: Jérémie Pignard

31 March 2024 27	Strasbourg	2–0	Rennes	Strasbourg
17:05 CEST (UTC+2)	Senaya 71'; Sebas 73'; Delaine (yellow card) 76'	Report	Terrier (yellow card) 17'; Matusiwa (yellow card) 24'	Stadium: Stade de la Meinau; Attendance: 25,407; Referee: Hakim Ben El Hadj

7 April 2024 28	Toulouse	0–0	Strasbourg	Toulouse
15:00 CET (UTC+1)	Dallinga (yellow card) 15'; Aboukhlal (yellow card) 86'	Report		Stadium: Stadium de Toulouse; Attendance: 23,672; Referee: Ruddy Buquet

13 April 2024 29	Strasbourg	3–1	Reims	Strasbourg
17:00 CEST (UTC+2)	Sissoko (yellow card) 28'; Gameiro 44' (pen.); Sylla 50'; Sahi 90+3'	Report	Nakamura 8'; Koné (yellow card) 28' (yellow-red card) 45+7'; Richardson (yellow card) 79'	Stadium: Stade de la Meinau; Attendance: 25,436; Referee: Willy Delajod

21 April 2024 30	Lille	1–0	Strasbourg	Villeneuve-d'Ascq
15:00 CEST (UTC+2)	David 13'; Alexsandro (yellow card) 23'; Santos (yellow card) 90+5'	Report	Sow (yellow card) 44'; Diarra (yellow card) 59'; Sylla (yellow card) 90+7'	Stadium: Stade Pierre-Mauroy; Attendance: 40,381; Referee: Benoît Millot

28 April 2024 31	Strasbourg	1–3	Nice	Strasbourg
15:00 CEST (UTC+2)	Bakwa 18'; Andrey Santos (yellow card) 49'; Sylla (yellow card) 63'	Report	Cho (yellow card) 34'; Guessand 44' (pen.); Dante 52'; Sanson 84', (yellow card) 90+3'; Bard (yellow card) 85'	Stadium: Stade de la Meinau; Attendance: 25,181; Referee: Thomas Léonard

4 May 2024 32	Le Havre	3–1	Strasbourg	Le Havre
15:00 CEST (UTC+2)	Kechta 24', 65', (yellow card) 54'; Salmier (yellow card) 41'; Desmas (yellow card) 88'; Ayew 90+6'	Report	Sissoko (yellow card) 75'; Guilbert 86'	Stadium: Stade Océane; Attendance: 22,293; Referee: Jérôme Brisard

12 May 2024 33	Strasbourg	2–1	Metz	Strasbourg
21:00 CEST (UTC+2)	Emegha 89'; Andrey Santos 90+1', (yellow card) 90+1'; Bellaarouch (yellow card) 90+7'	Report	S. Sané (yellow card) 11'; Mikautadze 54'; Candé (yellow card) 84'	Stadium: Stade de la Meinau; Attendance: 25,686; Referee: François Letexier

19 May 2024 34	Lyon	2–1	Strasbourg	Décines-Charpieu
21:00 CEST (UTC+2)	Lacazette 40', 90+6' (pen.), (yellow card) 90+8'	Report	Diarra 63'; Emegha (penalty missed) 77'; Andrey Santos (yellow card) 90+8'	Stadium: Parc Olympique Lyonnais; Attendance: 57,027; Referee: Eric Wattellier

=== Coupe de France ===
6 January 2024 Round of 64	Avoine Chinon	0–4	Strasbourg	Tours
18:00 CET (UTC+1)	Si Mohammed (yellow card) 45+1'; Bonyonya (yellow card) 63'; Sakhi (penalty missed) 67'	Report	Gameiro 15'; Sahi 18', 73'; Bechikh 89'	Stadium: Stade de la Vallée du Cher; Attendance: 9,484; Referee: Jérémy Stinat
Note: The match was played at the Stade de la Vallée du Cher in Tours, instead of Avoine Chinon's regular stadium, the Stade Marcel Vignaud in Avoine, which did not meet tournament requirements.

21 January 2024 Round of 32	Clermont	1–3	Strasbourg	Clermont-Ferrand
17:30 CET (UTC+1)	Keïta (yellow card) 52'; Ogier (yellow card) 59'; Nicholson (penalty missed) 88'; Zeffane 88'	Report	Sylla 32'; Guilbert (yellow card) 45+2'; Diarra 49'; Bakwa 60'; Emegha (yellow card) 73'; Doukouré (yellow card) 83'	Stadium: Stade Gabriel-Montpied; Attendance: 8,128; Referee: Mathieu Vernice

7 February 2024 Round of 16	Strasbourg	3–1	Le Havre	Strasbourg
20:30 CET (UTC+1)	Bakwa 21'; Sissoko (yellow card) 31'; Emegha 36'; Senaya 90'	Report	Ayew (yellow card) 17', (goal) 30'; Ndiaye (yellow card) 39'; Kuzyayev (red card) 80'	Stadium: Stade de la Meinau; Attendance: 19,653; Referee: Clément Turpin

27 February 2024 Quarter-finals	Lyon	0–0 (4–3 p)	Strasbourg	Décines-Charpieu
20:45 CET (UTC+1)	Ćaleta-Car (yellow card) 88'	Report	Mwanga (yellow card) 64'; Sissoko (yellow card) 88'; Bellaarouch (yellow card) 90+1'	Stadium: Parc Olympique Lyonnais; Attendance: 56,602; Referee: Benoît Bastien
	Penalties
	Caqueret (penalty scored); Orban (penalty scored); Maitland-Niles (penalty scored); Cherki (penalty scored)		(penalty missed) Delaine; (penalty scored) Doukouré; (penalty scored) Sissoko; (penalty scored) Emegha; (penalty missed) Perrin
