= Andrey Santos =

Brazilian footballer (born 2004)

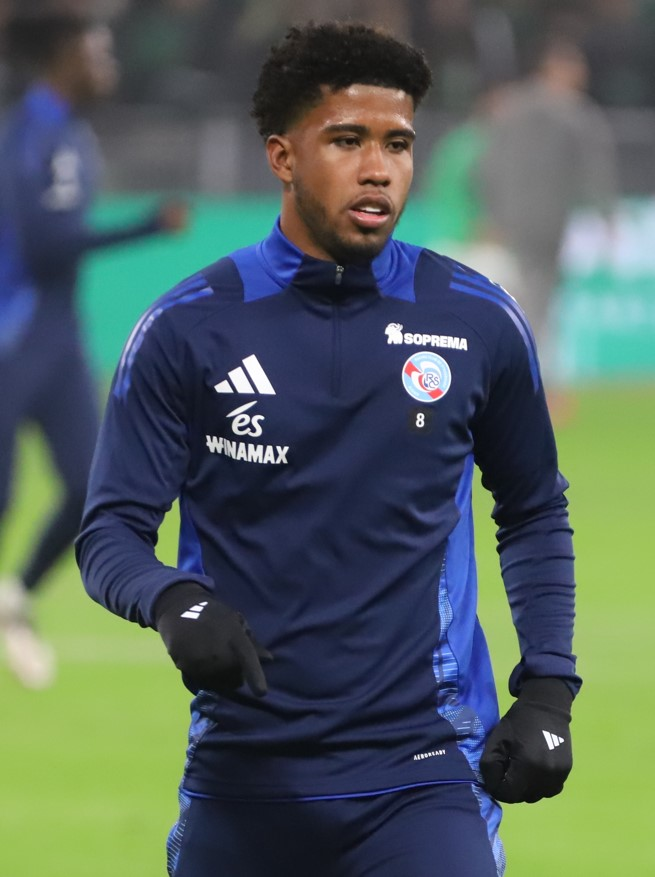
- Santos with Strasbourg in 2024

Personal information
- Full name: Andrey Nascimento dos Santos
- Date of birth: 3 May 2004 (age 22)
- Place of birth: Rio de Janeiro, Brazil
- Height: 1.80 m (5 ft 11 in)
- Position: Midfielder

Team information
- Current team: Manchester United
- Number: 17

Youth career
- –2021: Vasco da Gama

Senior career*
Years	Team	Apps	(Gls)
2021–2023	Vasco da Gama	38	(8)
2023–2026	Chelsea	27	(1)
2023	→ Vasco da Gama (loan)	10	(1)
2023–2024	→ Nottingham Forest (loan)	1	(0)
2024	→ Strasbourg (loan)	11	(1)
2024–2025	→ Strasbourg (loan)	32	(10)
2026–	Manchester United	7	(0)

International career^{‡}
2019	Brazil U15	6	(2)
2021–2023	Brazil U20	19	(10)
2024–	Brazil U23	6	(0)
2023–	Brazil	9	(0)
Medal record
Men's football
Representing Brazil
South American U-20 Championship
Winner	2023 Colombia
- * Club domestic league appearances and goals as of 20:37, 22 November 2026 (UTC) ‡ National team caps and goals as of 20:13, 14 November 2026 (UTC)

Andrey Nascimento dos Santos (Brazilian Portuguese: [ɐ̃ˈdɾej ˈsɐ̃tus]; born 3 May 2004) is a Brazilian professional footballer who plays as a midfielder for Premier League club Manchester United and the Brazil national team. Operating primarily as a central or defensive midfielder, Santos is known for his work rate, tackling, ball recovery, and ability to make late runs into the penalty area to score goals.

Santos began his career in Brazilian football with Vasco da Gama. He was signed by Chelsea in January 2023, returning to Vasco on loan shortly afterwards. While at Chelsea, he also had loans spells at Nottingham Forest and Strasbourg. He won the FIFA Club World Cup with Chelsea in 2025.

Santos has captained Brazil at under-20 and under-23 levels. He made his senior international debut at the age of 18 in March 2023.

== Club career ==
=== Vasco da Gama ===
At the age of four, Santos was introduced to futsal in an effort to lose weight. He fell in love with the game. He originally played in defence, before swapping to midfield during his time in Vasco da Gama's youth academy.

On 6 March 2021, at the age of 16, Santos made his professional debut for Vasco da Gama as an 85th-minute substitute in a 1–0 Campeonato Carioca loss away to Volta Redonda. He would go on to make his national league debut in a 3–0 Série B defeat away to Londrina on 28 November 2021. In the 2022 season, Vasco manager Zé Ricardo made Santos a starter in the team, propelling his career to new heights. He became the youngest goalscorer in the club's history on 7 June 2022, scoring in a 3–2 Série B victory away to Náutico.

=== Chelsea ===
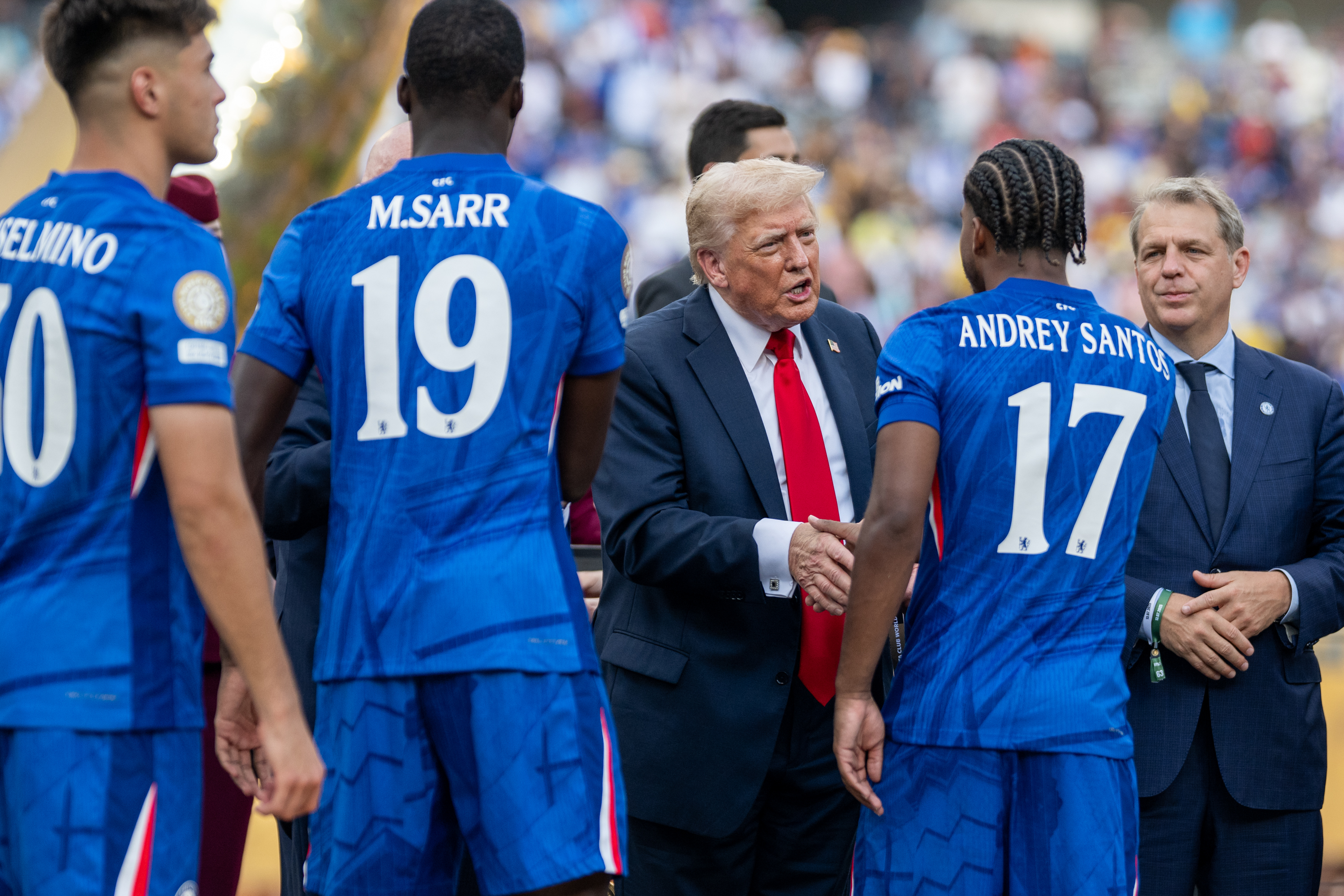
Santos shaking hands with Donald Trump after Chelsea's 2025 FIFA Club World Cup win

On 6 January 2023, Vasco da Gama announced that Santos had departed the club to join Premier League club Chelsea.

==== Loan to Vasco da Gama ====
On 2 March 2023, he returned to Vasco on loan until 30 June 2023.

==== Loan to Nottingham Forest ====
On 25 August 2023, Chelsea announced Santos' season-long loan to Nottingham Forest. He made his debut for Forest five days later on 30 August 2023, in the EFL Cup in a 1–0 defeat to Burnley. He made his Premier League debut on 29 October 2023, against Liverpool at Anfield in a 3–0 defeat. He was recalled from Nottingham Forest on 4 January 2024 after Santos only made two appearances in 5 months.

==== Loans to Strasbourg ====
On 1 February 2024, Santos was loaned to Ligue 1 club Strasbourg until the end of the season. He made his debut for Strasbourg on 8 February 2024, in a 3–1 defeat to Lorient in Ligue 1. His first goal for the club came on 12 May 2024, scoring the winning goal in extra time in a 2–1 win against Metz. He joined Chelsea on their summer pre-season tour in the USA, before returning to Strasbourg on a season-long loan on 2 August 2024.

==== Return to Chelsea ====
Santos made his debut for the club on 25 June 2025, in a 3–0 win against ES Tunis at the FIFA Club World Cup. He scored his first goal for the club on 29 October 2025, in a 4–3 win against Wolverhampton Wanderers in the EFL Cup.

=== Manchester United ===
On 13 July 2026, Santos joined Manchester United on a five-year contract. The transfer fee was reported to be £48 million.

== International career ==
=== Youth ===
Santos played youth international football for Brazil at under-15, under-20 and under-23 levels.

He represented Brazil's under-15s at the 2019 South American U-15 Championship, and captained the under-20 team to the title in the 2023 South American U-20 Championship. He was the tournament's joint-top scorer with six goals. Santos also captained Brazil at the 2023 FIFA U-20 World Cup. He was captain of the Brazil under-23 team at the 2024 CONMEBOL Pre-Olympic Tournament.

=== Senior ===
In March 2023, Santos was called-up by interim coach Ramon Menezes for Brazil's friendly away at Morocco, where he made his debut at the age of 18 as a starter in a 2–1 loss. He was named in Brazil's preliminary 55-man squad for the 2026 FIFA World Cup, but did not make the final 26-man squad.

== Career statistics ==
=== Club ===
As of match played 22 November 2026

Appearances by club, season and competition
Club	Season	League			State league (Note: Includes Campeonato Carioca)		National cup (Note: Includes Copa do Brasil, Coupe de France, FA Cup)		League cup (Note: Includes EFL Cup)		Continental		Other		Total	
Club	Season	Division	Apps	Goals	Apps	Goals	Apps	Goals	Apps	Goals	Apps	Goals	Apps	Goals	Apps	Goals
Vasco da Gama	2021	Série B	1	0	2	0	0	0	—		—		—		3	0
Vasco da Gama	2022	Série B	33	8	2	0	1	0	—		—		—		36	8
Vasco da Gama	2023 (Note: On loan from Chelsea)	Série A	6	1	4	0	1	0	—		—		—		11	1
Vasco da Gama	Total		40	9	8	0	2	0	—		—		—		50	9
Chelsea	2024–25	Premier League	—		—		—		—		—		4 (Note: Appearances in FIFA Club World Cup)	0	4	0
Chelsea	2025–26	Premier League	27	1	—		5	1	5	1	6 (Note: Appearances in UEFA Champions League)	0	—		43	3
Chelsea	Total		27	1	—		5	1	5	1	6	0	4	0	47	3
Nottingham Forest (loan)	2023–24	Premier League	1	0	—		—		1	0	—		—		2	0
Strasbourg (loan)	2023–24	Ligue 1	11	1	—		0	0	—		—		—		11	1
Strasbourg (loan)	2024–25	Ligue 1	32	10	—		2	1	—		—		—		34	11
Strasbourg (loan)	Total		43	11	—		2	1	—		—		—		45	12
Manchester United	2026–27	Premier League	7	0	—		0	0	1	0	3	0	—		11	0
Career total			118	21	8	0	9	2	7	1	9	0	4	0	155	24

=== International ===
As of match played 14 November 2026

Appearances and goals by national team and year
National team	Year	Apps	Goals
Brazil	2023	1	0
Brazil	2025	3	0
Brazil	2026	5	0
Total		9	0

== Honours ==
Vasco da Gama

- Taça Rio: 2021

Chelsea

- FIFA Club World Cup: 2025
- FA Cup runner-up: 2025–26

Brazil U15

- South American U-15 Championship: 2019

Brazil U20

- South American U-20 Championship: 2023

Individual

- South American U-20 Championship top scorer: 2023
- Ligue 1 Young Player of the Month: March 2024
