= Ismaël Doukouré =

French association football player (born 2003)

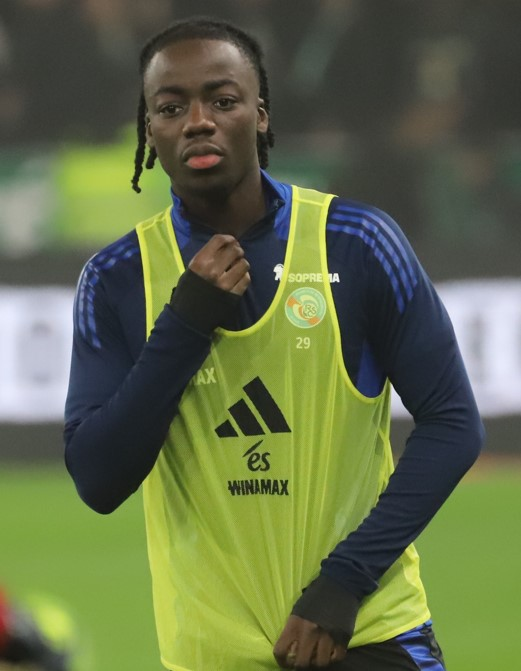
- Doukouré warming up with Strasbourg in 2024

Personal information
- Full name: Ismaël Landry Doukouré
- Date of birth: 24 July 2003 (age 23)
- Place of birth: Lille, France
- Height: 1.83 m (6 ft 0 in)
- Positions: Centre-back; defensive midfielder

Team information
- Current team: Strasbourg
- Number: 6

Youth career
- 2008–2009: Lille Wazemmes
- 2009–2012: IC de Lambersart
- 2012–2017: Lille
- 2017–2020: Valenciennes

Senior career*
Years	Team	Apps	(Gls)
2020–2022	Valenciennes	28	(0)
2020	→ Valenciennes B	1	(0)
2022–	Strasbourg	110	(2)

International career^{‡}
2023–2025	France U21	13	(0)
2021	France Olympic	1	(0)
- * Club domestic league appearances and goals as of 19 September 2026 ‡ National team caps and goals as of 25 June 2025

Ismaël Landry Doukouré (born 24 July 2003) is a French professional footballer who plays as a centre-back or a defensive midfielder for Ligue 1 club Strasbourg.

== Career ==
Doukouré began playing soccer at the club level for Lille Wazemmes at the age of six. In 2009, he followed his older brother, who also played soccer at the time, to Iris Club Lambersart, and then to LOSC Lille in 2012. According to Doukouré, discovering soccer changed his personality; in an exclusive interview with Onze Mondial, he described himself as a “wild child” who used to get into mischief before soccer alleviated his stress and transformed him into a “calmer” person.

In 2017, Doukouré signed his youth contract with Valenciennes, with whom he would eventually sign his first professional contract on 2 July 2020 for a three-year deal. He made his professional debut in a 0-0 Ligue 2 draw with Sochaux on 17 October 2020.

On 29 January 2022, Doukouré signed with Strasbourg under a four-and-a-half year contract for a fee of 1.5 million euros. In summer 2023, Doukouré expressed his desire to leave Strasbourg in an interview with L'équipe in order to "progress more in another league." However, Strasbourg, which was acquired by investing consortium BlueCo on 22 June 2023 under a strategy focused on youth talent and development, convinced Doukouré to remain with the club without extending his contract for the 2023-2024 season. In 2024, Doukouré attempted to transfer out of Strasbourg again amid interest from Wolfsburg, but his request was blocked by club management. He later extended his contract for another two years on 20 August 2025, tying himself to the club until June 2028. The renewal of his contract maps out a clear pathway for Doukouré to transfer to BlueCo sister club Chelsea F.C. in 2026 to fill out the Premier League team's defense.

In late April 2026, Doukouré began the process of changing his sporting nationality from France to the Ivory Coast.

== Personal life ==
Born in Lille, France, Doukouré is of Ivorian descent. His father worked at Carrefour, and his mother cleaned houses for a living.

== Career statistics ==
As of match played 19 September 2026

Appearances and goals by club, season and competition
Club	Season	League			Cup		Europe		Other		Total	
Club	Season	Division	Apps	Goals	Apps	Goals	Apps	Goals	Apps	Goals	Apps	Goals
Valenciennes B	2020–21	Championnat National 3	1	0	—		—		—		1	0
Valenciennes	2020–21	Ligue 2	19	0	2	0	—		—		21	0
Valenciennes	2021–22	Ligue 2	9	0	2	1	—		—		11	1
Valenciennes	Total		28	0	4	1	—		—		32	1
Strasbourg B	2021–22	Championnat National 3	2	0	—		—		—		2	0
Strasbourg	2021–22	Ligue 1	1	0	0	0	—		—		1	0
Strasbourg	2022–23	Ligue 1	28	1	1	0	—		—		29	1
Strasbourg	2023–24	Ligue 1	22	0	2	0	—		—		24	0
Strasbourg	2024–25	Ligue 1	31	1	1	0	—		—		32	1
Strasbourg	2025–26	Ligue 1	25	0	5	1	13 (Note: Appearances in UEFA Conference League)	0	—		43	1
Strasbourg	2026–27	Ligue 1	3	0	0	0	—		—		3	0
Strasbourg	Total		110	2	9	1	13	0	—		132	3
Career total			142	1	13	2	13	0	0	0	168	3
