= Pape Diong =

Senegalese footballer (born 2006)

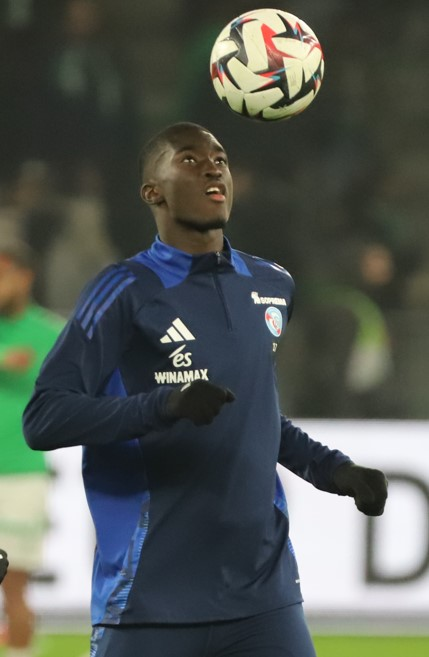
- Diong with Strasbourg in 2024

Personal information
- Full name: Pape Daouda Diong
- Date of birth: 15 June 2006 (age 20)
- Place of birth: Dakar, Senegal
- Height: 1.90 m (6 ft 3 in)
- Position: Midfielder

Team information
- Current team: Westerlo
- Number: 26

Youth career
- AF Darou Salam

Senior career*
Years	Team	Apps	(Gls)
–2024	AF Darou Salam		
2024–2026	Strasbourg	9	(1)
2024–2025	→ Strasbourg II	4	(0)
2025–2026	→ Dunkerque (loan)	26	(0)
2026–	Westerlo	1	(0)

International career^{‡}
2023	Senegal U17	4	(0)
2023	Senegal	1	(0)
2025	Senegal U20	3	(0)
- * Club domestic league appearances and goals as of 5 September 2026 ‡ National team caps and goals as of 8 May 2025

Pape Daouda Diong (born 15 June 2006) is a Senegalese professional footballer who plays as a midfielder for Belgian Pro League club Westerlo.

== Club career ==
Diong played in Senegal for AF Darou Salam in Dakar.

On 9 July 2024, Diong joined Ligue 1 club Strasbourg on a five-year deal.

On 16 July 2025, Diong was loaned to Dunkerque in Ligue 2 for the season.

On 27 August 2026, Diong moved to Westerlo in Belgium with a four-year contract.

== International career ==
He represented Senegal U17 at the 2023 FIFA U-17 World Cup, featuring in all four of their matches before they lost to eventual finalist France U17.

He made his debut for the senior Senegal national football team on 9 September 2023, in a 2023 Africa Cup of Nations qualification match against Rwanda.

== Style of play ==
Described as a defensive midfielder, he has been compared to Mamadou Lamine Camara who also came through the Darou Salam Football Academy. Whilst playing at the 2023 FIFA U-17 World Cup, He reportedly had the highest percentage (85.2%) of defensive duels won in the group stage.

== Career statistics ==
=== Club ===
As of match played 10 May 2026

Appearances and goals by club, season and competition
Club	Season	League			Coupe de France		Europe		Total	
Club	Season	Division	Apps	Goals	Apps	Goals	Apps	Goals	Apps	Goals
Strasbourg	2024–25	Ligue 1	9	1	2	0	—		11	1
Strasbourg	2026–27	Ligue 1	0	0	0	0	—		0	0
Strasbourg	Total		9	1	2	0	—		11	1
Strasbourg II	2024–25	CFA 1	4	0	—		—		4	0
Dunkerque (loan)	2025–26	Ligue 2	26	0	2	0	—		28	0
Career total			39	1	4	0	0	0	43	1

=== International ===
As of match played 9 September 2023

Appearances and goals by national team and year
National team	Year	Apps	Goals
Senegal	2023	1	0
Total		1	0
