= Saïdou Sow =

Guinean footballer (born 2002)

- Sow with Guinea in 2024

Personal information
- Date of birth: 4 July 2002 (age 24)
- Place of birth: Conakry, Guinea
- Height: 1.87 m (6 ft 2 in)
- Position: Centre-back

Team information
- Current team: Nantes (on loan from Strasbourg)
- Number: 4

Youth career
- –2016: SFC Neuilly-sur-Marne
- 2016–2020: Saint-Étienne

Senior career*
Years	Team	Apps	(Gls)
2020–2023	Saint-Étienne	53	(2)
2022	Saint-Étienne B	9	(0)
2023–	Strasbourg B	3	(0)
2023–	Strasbourg	22	(0)
2025	→ Nantes (loan)	9	(1)
2026	→ Clermont (loan)	12	(1)
2026–	→ Nantes (loan)	3	(0)

International career^{‡}
2024	Guinea U23	1	(0)
2020–	Guinea	28	(1)
- * Club domestic league appearances and goals as of 7 September 2026 ‡ National team caps and goals as of 10 June 2024

Saïdou Sow (born 4 July 2002) is a Guinean professional footballer who plays as a centre-back for Ligue 2 club Nantes, on loan from Strasbourg, and the Guinea national team.

== Club career ==
Sow made his professional debut for Saint-Étienne on 3 October 2020, in a Ligue 1 game against Lens, replacing Maxence Rivera in the 16th minute, after the early expulsion of Timothée Kolodziejczak.

On 25 January 2025, Sow moved to Nantes on loan. On 2 February 2026, Sow was loaned to Clermont.

== International career ==
On 10 October 2020, Sow made his international debut for Guinea in a friendly game against Cape Verde, entering as a substitute and proving to be instrumental in his side 2–1 win by making the assist for Yady Bangoura's decisive goal.

== Career statistics ==
=== Club ===
As of match played 4 April 2025

Appearances and goals by club, season and competition
Club	Season	League			National cup		Other		Total	
Club	Season	Division	Apps	Goals	Apps	Goals	Apps	Goals	Apps	Goals
Saint-Étienne	2020–21	Ligue 1	15	0	1	0	—		16	0
Saint-Étienne	2021–22	Ligue 1	13	2	1	0	0	0	14	2
Saint-Étienne	2022–23	Ligue 2	25	0	1	0	0	0	26	0
Saint-Étienne	Total		53	2	3	0	0	0	56	2
Saint-Étienne B	2021–22	CFA 3	3	0	—		—		3	0
Saint-Étienne B	2022–23	CFA 3	6	0	—		—		6	0
Saint-Étienne B	Total		9	0	—		—		9	0
Strasbourg B	2023–24	CFA 3	1	0	—		—		1	0
Strasbourg	2023–24	Ligue 1	10	0	2	0	—		12	0
Strasbourg	2024–25	Ligue 1	12	0	1	0	—		13	0
Strasbourg	2025–26	Ligue 1	0	0	0	0	—		0	0
Strasbourg	Total		22	0	3	0	—		25	0
Nantes (loan)	2024–25	Ligue 1	9	1	—		—		9	1
Career total			94	3	6	0	0	0	100	3

=== International ===
As of matches played on 10 June 2024

Appearances and goals by national team and year
National team	Year	Apps	Goals
Guinea	2020	2	0
Guinea	2021	5	0
Guinea	2022	5	0
Guinea	2023	9	1
Guinea	2024	3	0
Total		24	1

Scores and results list Sow's goal tally first.

No.	Date	Venue	Opponent	Score	Result	Competition
1.	9 September 2023	Bingu National Stadium, Lilongwe, Malawi	Malawi	2–2	2–2	2023 Africa Cup of Nations qualification
