= Emmanuel Emegha =

Dutch footballer (born 2003)

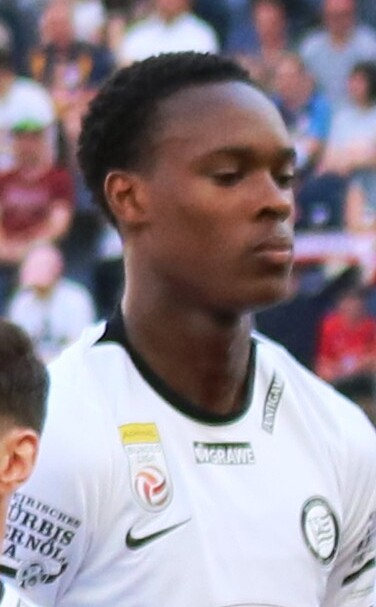
- Emegha with Sturm Graz in 2023

Personal information
- Full name: Emmanuel Esseh Emegha
- Date of birth: 3 February 2003 (age 23)
- Place of birth: The Hague, Netherlands
- Height: 1.96 m (6 ft 5 in)
- Position: Striker

Team information
- Current team: Chelsea
- Number: 22

Youth career
- KRSV Vredenburch
- –2020: Sparta Rotterdam

Senior career*
Years	Team	Apps	(Gls)
2020	Jong Sparta	5	(1)
2020–2022	Sparta Rotterdam	36	(3)
2022	Antwerp	1	(0)
2022–2023	Sturm Graz	27	(9)
2023–2026	Strasbourg	65	(26)
2026–	Chelsea	2	(1)

International career^{‡}
2015	Netherlands U15	1	(0)
2021–2023	Netherlands U19	7	(5)
2023	Netherlands U20	1	(2)
2023–2024	Netherlands U21	6	(2)
2025–	Netherlands	2	(0)
- * Club domestic league appearances and goals as of 19:13, 21 November 2026 (UTC) ‡ National team caps and goals as of 00:28, 17 November 2025 (UTC)

Emmanuel Esseh Emegha (born 3 February 2003) is a Dutch professional footballer who plays as a striker for Premier League club Chelsea and the Netherlands national team.

== Club career ==
Born in the neighborhood of Schilderswijk, The Hague, Emegha started playing football at Vredenburch in Rijswijk.

=== Sparta Rotterdam ===
Emegha started his professional career at Sparta Rotterdam in 2020. In his first season, he played 16 matches. In the 2021–22 season, he appeared in every match until January.

=== Royal Antwerp ===
On 31 January 2022, Emegha signed a five-year contract with Royal Antwerp in Belgium.

=== Sturm Graz ===
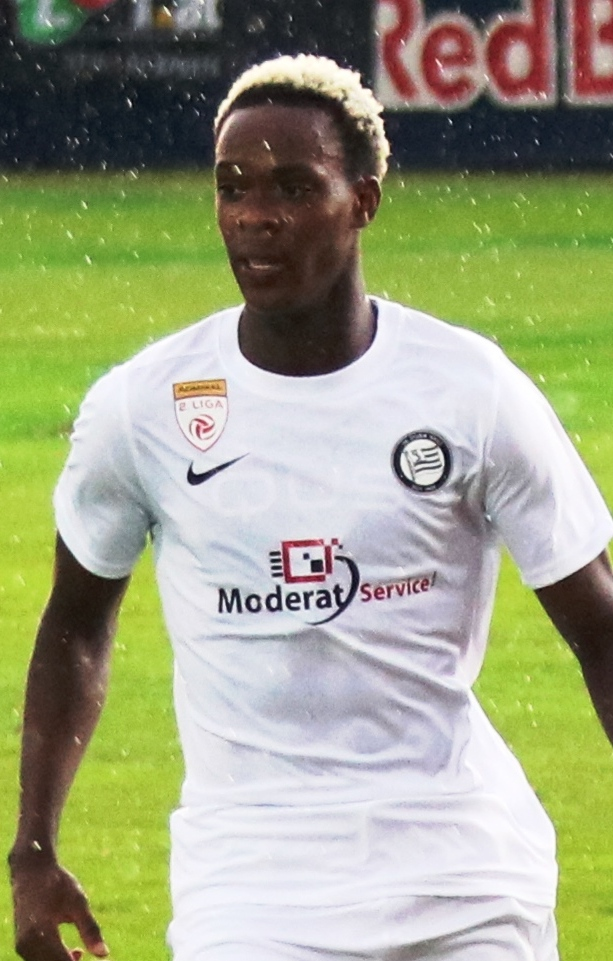
Emegha playing for Sturm Graz in 2022

In August 2022, after having played only a few minutes for Antwerp, Emegha moved to Sturm Graz in Austria and signed a contract for four years there.

On 30 April 2023, Emegha started in Sturm Graz's 2–0 win over Rapid Wien in the Austrian Cup final where he assisted the go-ahead goal that was scored by Manprit Sarkaria, and would score the cup securing goal himself 15 minutes later. It was the first trophy that he won in his football career.

=== Strasbourg ===
On 22 July 2023, Emegha signed for Strasbourg on a five-year deal for €13 million. On 27 July 2025, Emegha was named Strasbourg captain following the transfer of former captain Habib Diarra.

=== Chelsea ===
On 12 September 2025, Premier League club Chelsea announced an agreement with Strasbourg for Emegha to join the club in the summer of 2026. On 28 October 2026, Emegha made his debut for Chelsea, coming off the bench in the 68th minute in a 1–1 EFL cup tie against Liverpool at Anfield; Chelsea lost 5–6 on penalties after a shoot-out in which Emegha missed from the spot. Emegha scored his debut goal for the club on 21 November 2026, in a 1–4 loss against Leeds United at Stamford Bridge.

== International career ==
Born in the Netherlands to a Togolese-French father and Nigerian mother, Emegha is a youth international for the Netherlands. He also holds Togolese, French and Nigerian nationalities.

On 11 November 2025, he was called up to the senior Netherlands squad for the first time by manager, Ronald Koeman, after Wout Weghorst had to pull out as he was not fully fit due to his physical condition. Subsequently, on 14 November 2025, Emegha made his debut for the senior Netherlands team as a late substitute for Memphis Depay in the 1–1 draw vs Poland in 2026 World Cup qualification match.

== Personal life ==
For years, Emegha spelled his first name with just one "m" citing: "I was lazy and thought one 'm' was enough”. Jong Sparta adopted that spelling, but the Royal Dutch Football Association uses the official spelling with a double "m". He has a twin brother, Joshua.

== Career statistics ==
=== Club ===
As of match played 21 November 2026

Appearances and goals by club, season and competition
Club	Season	League			National cup (Note: Includes KNVB Cup, Austrian Cup, Coupe de France)		League cup (Note: Includes EFL Cup)		Europe		Other		Total	
Club	Season	Division	Apps	Goals	Apps	Goals	Apps	Goals	Apps	Goals	Apps	Goals	Apps	Goals
Jong Sparta	2019–20	Tweede Divisie	2	1	—		—		—		—		2	1
Jong Sparta	2020–21	Tweede Divisie	3	0	—		—		—		—		3	0
Jong Sparta	Total		5	1	—		—		—		—		5	1
Sparta Rotterdam	2020–21	Eredivisie	17	1	1	0	—		—		0	0	18	1
Sparta Rotterdam	2021–22	Eredivisie	19	2	2	0	—		—		—		21	2
Sparta Rotterdam	Total		36	3	3	0	—		—		0	0	39	3
Antwerp	2021–22	Belgian Pro League	1	0	—		—		—		0	0	1	0
Sturm Graz	2022–23	Austrian Bundesliga	27	9	4	0	—		5 (Note: Appearances in UEFA Europa League)	1	—		36	10
Strasbourg	2023–24	Ligue 1	28	8	3	1	—		—		—		31	9
Strasbourg	2024–25	Ligue 1	27	14	2	0	—		—		—		29	14
Strasbourg	2025–26	Ligue 1	10	4	1	0	—		7 (Note: Appearances in UEFA Conference League)	4	—		18	8
Strasbourg	Total		65	26	6	1	—		7	4	—		78	31
Chelsea	2026–27	Premier League	2	1	0	0	1	0	—		—		3	1
Career total			136	40	13	1	1	0	12	5	0	0	162	46

=== International ===
As of match played 17 November 2025

Appearances and goals by national team and year
National team	Year	Apps	Goals
Netherlands	2025	2	0
Total		2	0

== Honours ==
Sturm Graz

- Austrian Cup: 2022–23
