= Marvin Senaya =

Ghanaian footballer (born 2001

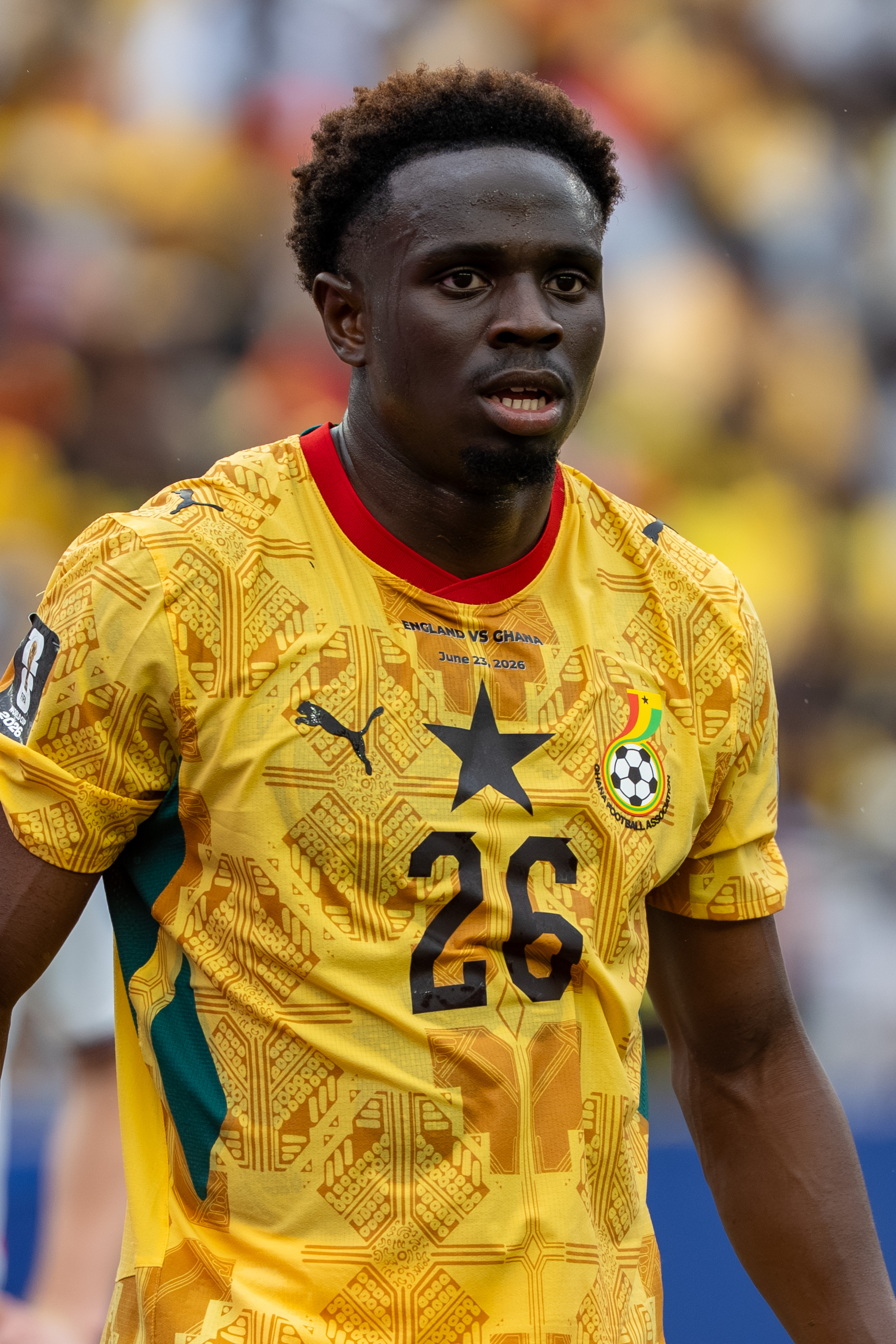
- Senaya with Ghana in 2026

Personal information
- Date of birth: 28 January 2001 (age 25)
- Place of birth: Saint-Maurice, France
- Height: 1.79 m (5 ft 10 in)
- Position: Right-back

Team information
- Current team: Auxerre
- Number: 29

Senior career*
Years	Team	Apps	(Gls)
2019–2024	Strasbourg II	19	(0)
2021–2025	Strasbourg	43	(1)
2021–2022	→ Sochaux (loan)	22	(0)
2022–2023	→ Rodez (loan)	34	(2)
2025	→ Lausanne-Sport (loan)	8	(0)
2025–	Auxerre	25	(1)

International career^{‡}
2026–	Ghana	6	(0)
- * Club domestic league appearances and goals as of 20 May 2026 ‡ National team caps and goals as of 4 July 2026

Marvin Senaya (born 28 January 2001) is a professional footballer who plays as a right-back for Ligue 1 club Auxerre. Born in France, he plays for the Ghana national team.

== Club career ==
Senaya began his senior career with the reserves of Strasbourg in 2019, and signed a professional contract with the senior team on 7 May 2021. On 31 August 2021, Senaya signed on loan with Sochaux for the 2020–21 season. He made his professional debut with Sochaux in a 2–0 Ligue 2 win over Paris FC on 18 September 2021.

Senaya made his Ligue 1 debut for Strasbourg on 14 August 2022 against Nice. On 17 August 2022, Senaya joined Rodez on loan.

On 6 February 2025, Senaya moved on loan to Lausanne-Sport in Switzerland. On 1 July 2025, Senaya signed a four-year contract with Ligue 1 club Auxerre.

== International career ==
Born in France, Senaya is of Ghanaian and Togolese descent. He was simultaneously called up to the Ghana national team and Togo in March 2026, opting to play for Ghana internationally.

On 2 June 2026, Senaya was named in head coach Carlos Queiroz's 26-man squad for the 2026 FIFA World Cup.

== Style of play ==
Senaya is a right-back known for his defensive tenacity and strength in one-on-one situations. He is an aggressive tackler, combining competitiveness with a high defensive work rate.

== Personal life ==
Senaya is the son of the retired Togolese footballer Yao Mawuko Sènaya.

== Career statistics ==
As of 1 July 2025

Appearances and goals by club, season and competition
Club	Season	League			Cup		Europe		Other		Total	
Club	Season	Division	Apps	Goals	Apps	Goals	Apps	Goals	Apps	Goals	Apps	Goals
Strasbourg II	2019–20	Championnat National 3	12	0	—		—		—		12	0
Strasbourg II	2020–21	Championnat National 3	6	0	—		—		—		6	0
Strasbourg II	2024–25	Championnat National 3	1	0	—		—		—		1	0
Strasbourg II	Total		19	0	—		—		—		19	0
Strasbourg	2020–21	Ligue 1	0	0	0	0	—		—		0	0
Strasbourg	2021–22	Ligue 1	0	0	0	0	—		—		0	0
Strasbourg	2022–23	Ligue 1	1	0	0	0	—		—		1	0
Strasbourg	2023–24	Ligue 1	32	1	3	0	—		—		35	1
Strasbourg	2024–25	Ligue 1	10	0	2	0	—		—		12	0
Strasbourg	Total		43	1	5	0	—		—		48	1
Sochaux (loan)	2021–22	Ligue 2	22	0	3	0	—		—		25	0
Rodez (loan)	2022–23	Ligue 2	34	2	4	0	—		—		38	2
Lausanne-Sport (loan)	2024–25	Swiss Super League	8	0	1	0	—		—		9	0
Auxerre	2025–26	Ligue 1	0	0	0	0	—		—		0	0
Career total			126	3	13	0	0	0	0	0	139	3

=== International ===
As of match played 3 July 2026

Appearances and goals by national team and year
National team	Year	Apps	Goals
Ghana	2026	6	0
Total		6	0
