= Dilane Bakwa =

French footballer (born 2002)

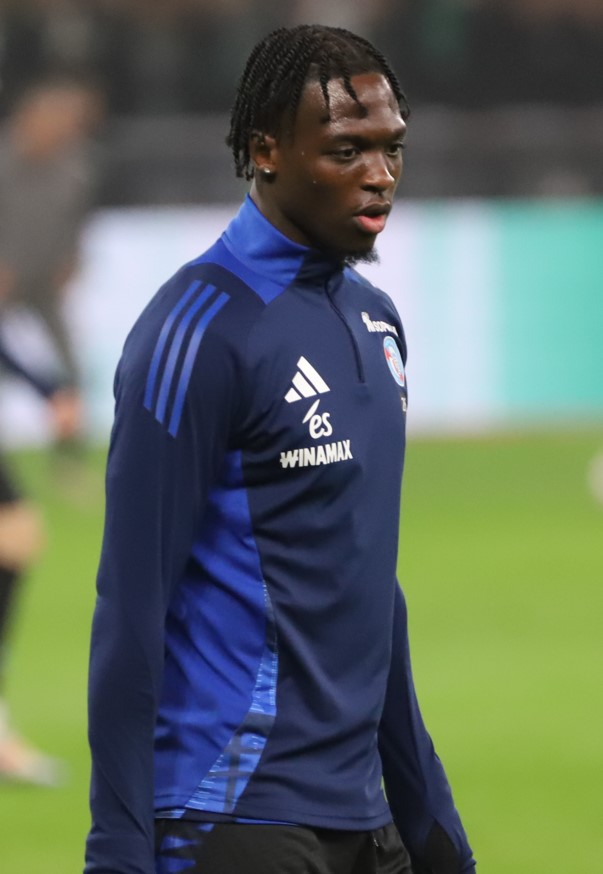
- Bakwa with Strasbourg in 2024

Personal information
- Full name: Dilane Ros-Anderson Bakwa
- Date of birth: 26 August 2002 (age 24)
- Place of birth: Créteil, France
- Height: 1.79 m (5 ft 10 in)
- Position: Winger

Team information
- Current team: Lille (on loan from Nottingham Forest)
- Number: 7

Youth career
- 2010–2012: Boissy
- 2013–2015: Lusitanos Saint-Maur
- 2015–2019: Bordeaux

Senior career*
Years	Team	Apps	(Gls)
2019–2023	Bordeaux B	18	(2)
2020–2023	Bordeaux	48	(5)
2023–2025	Strasbourg	64	(10)
2025–	Nottingham Forest	13	(0)
2026–	→ Lille (loan)	7	(2)

International career
2017–2018	France U16	9	(3)
2018–2019	France U17	19	(2)
2024–2025	France U21	6	(0)
- * Club domestic league appearances and goals as of 30 October 2026

Dilane Ros-Anderson Bakwa (born 26 August 2002) is a French professional footballer who plays as winger for Ligue 1 club Lille, on loan from Premier League club Nottingham Forest.

== Club career ==
On 28 May 2019, Bakwa signed his first professional contract with Bordeaux. He made his professional debut with Bordeaux in a 0–0 Ligue 1 tie with Nice on 27 September 2020.

In August 2023, Bakwa signed a four-year contract with Strasbourg. Later that year, on 17 December, he netted his first goal for the club in a 2–1 away victory over Lorient.

On 1 September 2025, Bakwa joined Premier League club Nottingham Forest in a deal worth €35m including add-ons and signed a five-year contract.

On 26 August 26, Bakwa returned to France, joining Ligue 1 side Lille on a season-long loan.

== Personal life ==
Born in France, Bakwa is of Congolese descent.

== Career statistics ==
As of match played 3 November 2026

Appearances and goals by club, season and competition
Club	Season	League			National cup (Note: Includes Coupe de France, FA Cup)		League cup (Note: Includes EFL Cup)		Europe		Total	
Club	Season	Division	Apps	Goals	Apps	Goals	Apps	Goals	Apps	Goals	Apps	Goals
Bordeaux B	2018–19	CFA	1	0	—		—		—		1	0
Bordeaux B	2019–20	CFA 2	6	1	—		—		—		6	1
Bordeaux B	2020–21	CFA 2	1	0	—		—		—		1	0
Bordeaux B	2021–22	CFA 2	10	1	—		—		—		10	1
Bordeaux B	Total		18	2	—		—		—		18	2
Bordeaux	2020–21	Ligue 1	7	0	1	0	—		—		8	0
Bordeaux	2021–22	Ligue 1	5	0	0	0	—		—		5	0
Bordeaux	2022–23	Ligue 2	36	5	3	0	—		—		38	5
Bordeaux	Total		48	5	4	0	—		—		52	5
Strasbourg	2023–24	Ligue 1	31	3	3	1	—		—		34	4
Strasbourg	2024–25	Ligue 1	30	5	1	0	—		—		31	5
Strasbourg	2025–26	Ligue 1	3	0	—		—		1 (Note: Appearance in UEFA Conference League)	0	4	0
Strasbourg	Total		64	8	4	1	0	0	—		69	9
Nottingham Forest	2025–26	Premier League	13	0	1	0	1	0	6 (Note: Appearances in UEFA Europa League)	0	21	0
Lille (loan)	2026–27	Ligue 1	7	2	0	0	—		4 (Note: Appearances in UEFA Champions League)	0	11	2
Career total			150	17	9	1	1	0	11	0	171	18
