= Ange-Loïc N'Gatta =

Footballer (born 2003)

Personal information
- Date of birth: 11 December 2003 (age 22)
- Place of birth: Orléans, France
- Height: 1.75 m (5 ft 9 in)
- Position: Right-back

Team information
- Current team: Grenoble
- Number: 22

Senior career*
Years	Team	Apps	(Gls)
2021–2022	Orléans B	10	(0)
2022–2025	Auxerre B	37	(1)
2023–2025	Auxerre	6	(0)
2025–	Grenoble	5	(0)

International career^{‡}
2025–	Ivory Coast U23	1	(0)
- * Club domestic league appearances and goals as of 12 May 2026 ‡ National team caps and goals as of 6 June 2025

Ange-Loïc N'Gatta (born 11 December 2003) is a professional footballer who plays as a right-back for Ligue 2 club Grenoble. Born in France, he is a youth international for Ivory Coast.

== Club career ==
On 11 August 2023, N'Gatta signed his first professional contract with Auxerre, a deal until 2026. The following day, he made his professional debut in Ligue 2 in a 1–0 home defeat to Amiens. On 16 November 2023, N'Gatta received a one-match suspension and a €1,000 fine by the LFP for having bet on matches in the prior season. On 1 February 2024, Auxerre manager Christophe Pélissier announced that N'Gatta had suffered an injury that would keep him out of action for three months. This was his second major injury of the 2023–24 season, after an injury in early September 2023 had been expected to keep him off the pitch from six to eight weeks.

N'Gatta joined Ligue 2 club Grenoble on 11 June 2025.

== International career ==
Born in France, N'Gatta is of Ivorian descent. On 27 May 2025, he was called up to the Ivory Coast U23s for a friendly. He debuted with the Ivory Coast U23s in a friendly 3–0 loss to the Netherlands U23s on 6 June 2025.

== Honours ==
Auxerre

- Ligue 2: 2023–24
