= Ben Viadère =

French footballer (born 2005)

Personal information
- Full name: Joseph Ben Viadère
- Date of birth: 2 September 2005 (age 21)
- Place of birth: Saint-Pierre, Réunion, France
- Height: 1.76 m (5 ft 9 in)
- Position: Forward

Youth career
- –2021: JS Saint-Pierroise
- 2021–2024: Auxerre

Senior career*
Years	Team	Apps	(Gls)
2023–2025	Auxerre B	16	(1)
2024–2025	Auxerre	1	(0)
- * Club domestic league appearances and goals as of 17 May 2025

Joseph Ben Viadère (born 2 September 2005) is a French professional footballer who plays as a forward.

== Career ==
In the 2023–24 season, Viadère was part of the Auxerre under-19s that finished as runners-up in the Championnat National U19. He set up his teammate Rayan Mandengue's opening goal in the final, an eventual 3–1 defeat to Paris Saint-Germain.

On 31 July 2024, Viadère scored his first senior goal for Auxerre in a 2–1 friendly win over Troyes, a goal scored from a free kick. He scored another free kick in a 2–0 friendly win over Red Star three days later. On 25 August, Viadère made his professional and Ligue 1 debut as a substitute in a 2–0 defeat to Nantes.

== Honours ==
Auxerre U19

- Championnat National U19 runner-up: 2023–24
