= Lucas Perrin =

French footballer (born 1998)

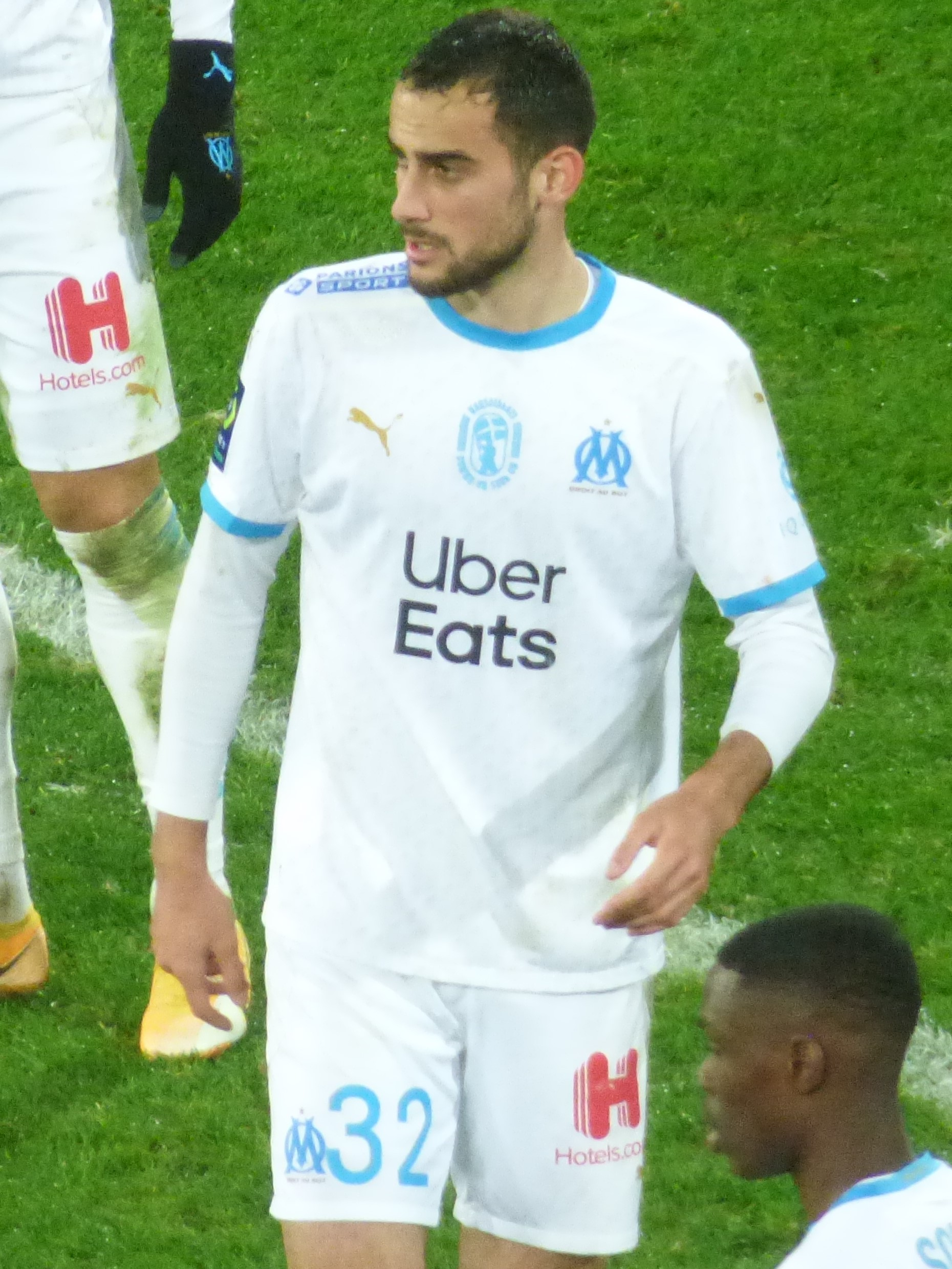
- Perrin playing for Marseille in 2021

Personal information
- Date of birth: 19 November 1998 (age 27)
- Place of birth: Marseille, France
- Height: 1.88 m (6 ft 2 in)
- Position: Centre-back

Team information
- Current team: Nantes
- Number: 5

Youth career
- 2004–2019: Marseille

Senior career*
Years	Team	Apps	(Gls)
2015–2019	Marseille II	62	(3)
2019–2022	Marseille	11	(1)
2021–2022	→ Strasbourg (loan)	33	(1)
2022–2024	Strasbourg	91	(1)
2024–2025	Hamburger SV	6	(0)
2025	→ Cercle Brugge (loan)	12	(2)
2025–2026	Sporting Gijón	24	(2)
2026–	Nantes	0	(0)

International career
2013	France U16	1	(0)
- * Club domestic league appearances and goals as of 6 June 2026

Lucas Perrin (born 19 November 1998) is a French professional footballer who plays as a centre-back for Ligue 2 club Nantes.

== Club career ==
=== Marseille ===
Perrin made his professional debut on 24 September 2019 in a Ligue 1 game against Dijon. He started the match and played the full 90 minutes in a 0–0 away draw.

On 30 June 2020 he extended his contract with the club.

=== Hamburger SV ===
On 30 August 2024, Strasbourg and Hamburger SV reached an agreement for the transfer of Perrin.

==== Loan to Cercle Brugge ====
On 30 January 2025, Perrin was loaned by Cercle Brugge in Belgium, with an option to buy.

=== Sporting Gijón ===
On 7 July 2025, Perrin signed a two-year contract with Spanish Segunda División side Sporting Gijón.

=== Nantes ===
On 8 July 2026, Perrin signed a two-year contract with French Ligue 2 side Nantes, with an option for a third year.

== Career statistics ==
=== Club ===
As of match played 29 August 2025

Club	Season	League			National Cup^{1}		League Cup		Continental		Other		Total	
Club	Season	Division	Apps	Goals	Apps	Goals	Apps	Goals	Apps	Goals	Apps	Goals	Apps	Goals
Marseille B	2016–17	National 2	9	0	—		—		—		—		9	0
Marseille B	2017–18	National 2	26	1	—		—		—		—		26	1
Marseille B	2018–19	National 2	20	1	—		—		—		—		20	1
Marseille B	2019–20	National 2	6	1	—		—		—		—		6	1
Marseille B	Total		61	3	—		—		—		—		61	3
Marseille	2019–20	Ligue 1	4	0	1	0	0	0	—		—		5	0
Marseille	2020–21	Ligue 1	7	1	1	0	—		0	0	—		8	1
Marseille	Total		11	1	2	0	0	0	0	0	—		13	1
Strasbourg	2021–22	Ligue 1	33	1	2	0	0	0	—		—		35	1
Strasbourg	2022–23	Ligue 1	27	0	1	0	0	0	—		—		28	0
Strasbourg	2023–24	Ligue 1	31	0	2	0	0	0	—		—		33	0
Strasbourg	Total		91	1	5	0	0	0	0	0	—		96	1
Hamburger SV	2024–25	2. Bundesliga	6	0	0	0	—		—		—		6	0
Hamburger SV	2025–26	Bundesliga	0	0	0	0	—		—		—		0	0
Hamburger SV	Total		6	0	0	0	—		—		—		6	0
Cercle Brugge (loan)	2024–25	Belgian Pro League	12	2	0	0	—		2^{2}	0	2^{3}	0	16	2
Sporting Gijón	2025–26	Segunda División	3	0	0	0	—		—		—		3	0
Career total			124	6	7	0	0	0	2	0	2	0	135	6

^{1}Includes Coupe de France.

^{2}Appearances in UEFA Conference League.

^{3}Appearances in Belgian Second Division play-offs.
