= Abakar Sylla =

Ivorian footballer (born 2002)

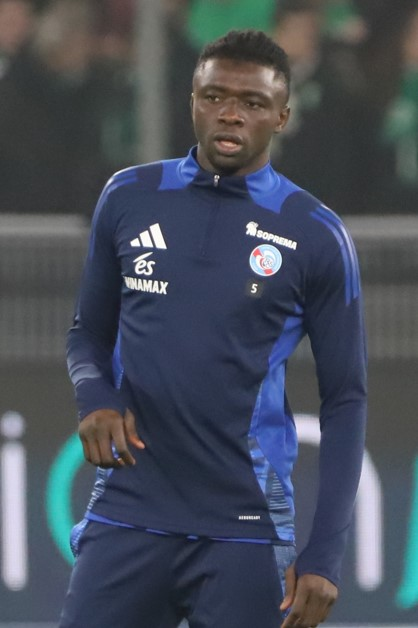
- Sylla with Strasbourg in 2024

Personal information
- Full name: Loubadhe Abakar Sylla
- Date of birth: 25 December 2002 (age 23)
- Place of birth: Yamoussoukro, Ivory Coast
- Height: 1.88 m (6 ft 2 in)
- Position: Centre-back

Team information
- Current team: Gaziantep
- Number: 21

Youth career
- –2021: SO Armée
- 2021: Club NXT

Senior career*
Years	Team	Apps	(Gls)
2020–2023	Club Brugge	21	(0)
2023–2026	Strasbourg	44	(3)
2025–2026	Strasbourg B	1	(0)
2026	→ Nantes (loan)	2	(0)
2026	→ Nantes B (loan)	3	(0)
2026–	Gaziantep	1	(0)

International career^{‡}
2022–	Ivory Coast	5	(0)
- * Club domestic league appearances and goals as of 7 September 2026 ‡ National team caps and goals as of 21:17, 28 March 2023 (UTC)

Loubadhe Abakar Sylla (born 25 December 2002) is an Ivorian professional footballer who plays as a centre-back for Süper Lig club Gaziantep in Turkey.

== Career ==
Sylla started his career with Ivory Coast side SO Armée. He moved to Belgium side Club Brugge's reserve team Club NXT in September 2021. Sylla made his debut for Club Brugge as a substitute in a 1–1 home draw against R.S.C. Anderlecht at the Jan Breydel Stadium on 22 May 2022. On his UEFA Champions League debut on 7 September 2022, he scored the only goal of the game as Club Brugge secured a 1–0 home win against Bayer Leverkusen.

On 15 July 2023, Sylla joined Ligue 1 club Strasbourg by signing a five-year deal, for a reported club-record fee of €20m plus €2m in add-ons.

On 2 February 2026, Sylla moved on loan to Nantes until the end of the 2025–26 season.

On 4 September 2026, Sylla joined Gaziantep in Turkey on a two-year contract with an optional third year.

== Career statistics ==
=== Club ===
As of match played 13 February 2026

Appearances and goals by club, season and competition
Club	Season	League			Cup		Europe		Other		Total	
Club	Season	Division	Apps	Goals	Apps	Goals	Apps	Goals	Apps	Goals	Apps	Goals
Club Brugge	2021–22	Belgian Pro League	1	0	0	0	0	0	0	0	1	0
Club Brugge	2022–23	Belgian Pro League	20	0	1	0	6 (Note: Appearances in the UEFA Champions League)	1	0	0	27	1
Club Brugge	Total		21	0	1	0	6	1	0	0	28	1
Strasbourg	2023–24	Ligue 1	22	2	2	1	—		—		24	3
Strasbourg	2024–25	Ligue 1	21	1	3	0	—		—		24	1
Strasbourg	2025–26	Ligue 1	1	0	1	0	0	0	—		2	0
Strasbourg	2026–27	Ligue 1	0	0	0	0	—		—		0	0
Strasbourg	Total		44	3	6	1	0	0	—		50	4
Nantes (loan)	2025–26	Ligue 1	2	0	—		—		—		2	0
Nantes B (loan)	2025–26	CFA	3	0	—		—		—		3	0
Career total			70	3	7	1	6	1	0	0	83	5

=== International ===
As of match played 28 March 2023

Appearances and goals by national team and year
National team	Year	Apps	Goals
Ivory Coast	2022	3	0
Ivory Coast	2023	2	0
Total		5	0

== Honours ==
Club Brugge

- Belgian First Division A: 2021–22
