= 2024–25 RC Strasbourg Alsace season =

RC Strasbourg Alsace
2024–25 season
- Owner: BlueCo
- President: Marc Keller
- Head coach: Liam Rosenior
- Stadium: Stade de la Meinau
- Ligue 1: 7th
- Coupe de France: Round of 16
- Top goalscorer: League: Emanuel Emegha (14); All: Emanuel Emegha (14)
- Average home league attendance: 19,380
Home colours	Away colours	Third colours

The 2024–25 season was the 119th season in the history of RC Strasbourg Alsace, and the club's eighth consecutive season in Ligue 1. In addition to the domestic league, the club also participated in the Coupe de France.

On 18 July 2024, during the pre-season, Strasbourg decided to end their association with manager Patrick Vieira.

== Transfers ==
=== In ===
No.	Pos.	Player	Transferred from	Fee	Date	Source
20	MF	(Colombia) Óscar Perea	(Colombia) Atlético Nacional	€5.2 million	2 July 2024	
17	MF	(Senegal) Pape Daouda Diong	(Senegal) AF Darou Salam	€1.2 million (Note: Up to €1 million in bonuses.)	9 July 2024	
22	DF	(Ivory Coast) Guéla Doué	(France) Rennes	€6 million (Note: Up to €2 million in bonuses.)	26 July 2024	
8	MF	(Brazil) Andrey Santos	(England) Chelsea	Loan	2 August 2024	
12	DF	(United States) Caleb Wiley	(England) Chelsea	Loan	11 August 2024	
6	MF	(France) Félix Lemaréchal	(France) Monaco	€6 million	13 August 2024	
—	FW	(France) Rayane Messi	(France) Dijon	€1.5 million	14 August 2024	
7	FW	(Portugal) Diego Moreira	(England) Chelsea	€2 million	16 August 2024	
30	GK	(Sweden) Karl-Johan Johnsson	Unattached	Free	16 August 2024	
14	FW	(France) Sékou Mara	(England) Southampton	€12 million	21 August 2024	
23	DF	(France) Mamadou Sarr	(France) Lyon	€10 million	22 August 2024	
15	MF	(Sweden) Sebastian Nanasi	(Sweden) Malmö FF	€11 million	23 August 2024	
25	DF	(France) Yoni Gomis	(France) Le Havre	€2.5 million	29 August 2024	
1	GK	(Serbia) Đorđe Petrović	(England) Chelsea	Loan	30 August 2024	

=== Out ===
Pos.	Player	Transferred to	Fee	Date	Source
MF	(Brazil) Andrey Santos	(England) Chelsea	Loan return	1 July 2024	
FW	(Brazil) Ângelo Gabriel	(England) Chelsea	Loan return	1 July 2024	
GK	(Haiti) Alexandre Pierre	(France) Sochaux	Free	1 July 2024	
MF	(Ivory Coast) Jean-Eudes Aholou	(France) Angers	Free	1 July 2024	
MF	(Mali) Ibrahima Sissoko	(Germany) VfL Bochum	Free	1 July 2024	
FW	(France) Kevin Gameiro	Released	Free	1 July 2024	
FW	(South Africa) Lebo Mothiba	Released	Free	1 July 2024	
MF	(France) Jessy Deminguet	(France) Metz	Loan	10 July 2024	
MF	(Haiti) Dany Jean	(France) Rodez	Loan	7 August 2024	
DF	(France) Steven Baseya	(France) Villefranche	Loan	15 August 2024	
FW	(Ivory Coast) Patrick Ouotro	(France) Martigues	Loan	16 August 2024	
DF	(France) Frédéric Guilbert	(Italy) Lecce	Free	27 August 2024	
MF	(Republic of the Congo) Rabby Nzingoula	(France) Montpellier	Loan	28 August 2024	
FW	(France) Aboubacar Ali	(France) Nîmes	Loan	30 August 2024	
DF	(France) Lucas Perrin	(Germany) Hamburger SV	Free	30 August 2024	
MF	(Morocco) Nordine Kandil	(France) Amiens	Free	30 August 2024	

== Friendlies ==
=== Pre-season ===
4 July 2024 Friendly	Strasbourg	1–2	1860 Munich	Windischgarsten, Austria
18:00	Ouotro 66'		Hobsch 38', 83' (pen.)	Stadium: Sportplatz Windischgarsten

9 July 2024 Friendly	Wolfsberger AC	0–0	Strasbourg	Windischgarsten, Austria
18:00	(red card) 45+2'			Stadium: Sportplatz Windischgarsten

13 July 2024 Friendly	Strasbourg	0–4	Fenerbahçe	Graz
18:30		Report	Szymański 6'; Tadić 34'; Kent 37'; Džeko 45'	Stadium: Liebenauer Stadium

27 July 2024 Friendly	Karlsruher SC	4–1	Strasbourg
15:30

3 August 2024 Friendly	Strasbourg	2–2	SC Freiburg
15:30

3 August 2024 Friendly	Strasbourg	2–3	SC Freiburg
18:00

10 August 2024 Friendly	Borussia Mönchengladbach	1–0	Strasbourg
11:00

10 August 2024 Friendly	Borussia Mönchengladbach	2–0	Strasbourg
15:30

== Competitions ==
=== Overall record ===
Competition	First match	Last match	Starting round	Final position	Record							
Competition	First match	Last match	Starting round	Final position	Pld	W	D	L	GF	GA	GD	Win %
Ligue 1	18 August 2024	17 May 2025	Matchday 1	7th	34	16	9	9	56	44	+12	47.06
Coupe de France	21 December 2024	5 February 2025	Round of 64	Round of 16	3	1	1	1	6	5	+1	33.33
Total					37	17	10	10	62	49	+13	45.95

Source: Soccerway

=== Ligue 1 ===
==== League table ====
Pos	Team	Pld	W	D	L	GF	GA	GD	Pts	Qualification or relegation
5	Lille	34	17	9	8	52	36	+16	60	Qualification for the Europa League league phase (Note: Since the 2024–25 Coupe de France winners, Paris Saint-Germain, qualified for the Champions League via league position, the Europa League berth awarded to the cup winners was passed to the sixth-placed team and the Conference League berth was passed to the seventh-placed team.)
6	Lyon	34	17	6	11	65	46	+19	57	Qualification for the Europa League league phase
7	Strasbourg	34	16	9	9	56	44	+12	57	Qualification for the Conference League play-off round
8	Lens	34	15	7	12	42	39	+3	52	
9	Brest	34	15	5	14	52	59	−7	50	

Source: Ligue 1
Rules for classification: 1) Points; 2) Goal difference; 3) Head-to-head points; 4) Head-to-head goal difference; 5) Head-to-head goals scored; 6) Head-to-head away goals scored; 7) Goals scored; 8) Away goals scored; 9) Fair-play points (Note: Head-to-head record is used only after all the matches between the teams in question have been played).

==== Results summary ====
Overall								Home						Away					
Pld	W	D	L	GF	GA	GD	Pts	W	D	L	GF	GA	GD	W	D	L	GF	GA	GD
34	16	9	9	56	44	+12	57	10	5	2	33	20	+13	6	4	7	23	24	−1

Source: Ligue 1

==== Results by round ====
Round	1	2	3	4	5	6	7	8	9	10	11	12	13	14	15	16	17	18	19	20	21	22	23	24	25	26	27	28	29	30	31	32	33	34
Ground	A	H	A	H	A	H	H	A	H	A	H	A	A	H	A	H	A	A	H	A	H	A	H	A	A	H	H	A	H	A	H	H	A	H
Result	D	W	L	D	D	W	D	L	W	L	L	L	L	D	W	W	W	D	W	L	W	W	D	W	W	W	W	W	D	D	W	W	L	L
Position	9	6	9	10	10	8	7	10	9	9	11	11	13	14	13	10	9	10	9	9	9	7	7	7	7	7	6	4	6	7	6	6	6	7

Source: Ligue 1
A = Away; H = Home; W = Win; D = Draw; L = Loss

==== Matches ====
The league schedule was released on 21 June 2024.

18 August 2024 1	Montpellier	1–1	Strasbourg	Montpellier
17:00 CEST (UTC+2)	Ferri (yellow card) 21'; Sagnan (yellow card) 52'; Savanier 67' (pen.); Nordin (yellow card) 78'; Al-Taamari (yellow card) 90+2'	Report	Sylla (yellow card) 27'; Diarra 58'; Doukouré (yellow card) 82'; Fila (yellow card) 90+8'	Stadium: Stade de la Mosson; Attendance: 15,706; Referee: Mathieu Vernice

25 August 2024 2	Strasbourg	3–1	Rennes	Strasbourg
17:00 CEST (UTC+2)	Andrey Santos 23'; Emegha 48'; Moreira (yellow card) 55'; Wooh 87' (o.g.); Mara (yellow card) 89'	Report	Wooh (yellow card) 19'; Seidu (yellow card) 40'; Blas 57'; Østigård (yellow card) 89'; James (yellow card) 90'	Stadium: Stade de la Meinau; Attendance: 19,026; Referee: Eric Wattellier

25 August 2024 3	Lyon	4–3	Strasbourg	Décines-Charpieu
20:45 CEST (UTC+2)	Tolisso 45+2'; Maitland-Niles 61'; Orban 63', 72'	Report	Nanasi 3'; Andrey Santos 48'; Emegha 58'	Stadium: Parc Olympique Lyonnais; Attendance: 43,805; Referee: Thomas Léonard

15 September 2024 4	Strasbourg	1–1	Angers	Strasbourg
17:00 CEST (UTC+2)	Sylla (yellow card) 4'; Nanasi 31'; Doué (yellow card) 40'; Diarra (yellow card) 67'; Emegha (yellow card) 90+3'	Report	Dieng 62'; Hanin (yellow card) 65'; Emegha 58'	Stadium: Stade de la Meinau; Attendance: 19,135; Referee: Hakim Ben El Hadj

21 September 2024 5	Lille	3–3	Strasbourg	Villeneuve-d'Ascq
17:00 CEST (UTC+2)	Zhegrova 15', 27'; André (yellow card) 64'; Diakité (yellow card) 70'; David 84' (pen.)	Report	Sow (yellow card) 7'; Andrey Santos 30'; Emegha 42'; Nanasi 66'; Senaya (yellow card) 82'	Stadium: Stade Pierre-Mauroy; Attendance: 39,516; Referee: Jérôme Brisard

29 September 2024 6	Strasbourg	1–0	Marseille	Strasbourg
20:45 CEST (UTC+2)	Moreira 40'; Doukouré (yellow card) 56'; Doué (yellow card) 68'	Report	Rabiot (yellow card) 75'	Stadium: Stade de la Meinau; Attendance: 19,790; Referee: Willy Delajod

6 October 2024 7	Strasbourg	2–2	Lens	Strasbourg
17:00 CEST (UTC+2)	Sylla 18'; Andrey Santos (yellow card) 22'; Doukouré (yellow card) 41'; Diarra 60'	Report	Nzola 5', (yellow card) 70'; Chávez (yellow card) 38'; Saïd (yellow card) 41'; Diouf 44'; Medina (yellow card) 64'	Stadium: Stade de la Meinau; Attendance: 19,968; Referee: Stéphanie Frappart

19 October 2024 8	Paris Saint-Germain	4–2	Strasbourg	Paris
21:00 CEST (UTC+2)	Mayulu 18'; Asensio 47'; Beraldo (yellow card) 60'; Barcola 66'; Lee 90'; Škriniar (yellow card) 90+7'	Report	Senaya (yellow card) 10'; Mara 58'; Sow (yellow card) 72'; Diong 90+2'	Stadium: Parc des Princes; Attendance: 47,590; Referee: Jérémy Stinat

27 October 2024 9	Strasbourg	3–1	Nantes	Strasbourg
17:00 CET (UTC+1)	Andrey Santos 17', 57', (yellow card) 38'; Bakwa 73'; Diarra (yellow card) 90+6'	Report	Guirassy 83'; Lepenant (yellow card) 87'; Ganago (yellow card) 90+2'; Zézé (yellow card) 90+6'	Stadium: Stade de la Meinau; Attendance: 19,398; Referee: Hakim Ben El Hadj

2 November 2024 10	Saint-Étienne	2–0	Strasbourg	Saint-Étienne
21:00 CET (UTC+1)	Pétrot (yellow card) 40'; Mouton (yellow card) 47'; Nadé 51'; Sissoko 65'	Report	Sarr (yellow card) 26'	Stadium: Stade Geoffroy-Guichard; Attendance: 33,043; Referee: Eric Wattellier

9 November 2024 11	Strasbourg	1–3	Monaco	Strasbourg
17:00 CET (UTC+1)	Doué (yellow card) 25', (goal) 29'; Petrović (yellow card) 63'; Moreira (yellow card) 78'; Diarra (yellow card) 82'; Wiley (yellow card) 86'	Report	Caio Henrique (yellow card) 22'; Camara (yellow card) 35'; Ben Seghir 79' (pen.), 89'; Ilenikhena 90+1'	Stadium: Stade de la Meinau; Attendance: 19,451; Referee: Bastien Dechepy

24 November 2024 12	Nice	2–1	Strasbourg	Nice
21:00 CET (UTC+1)	Dante (yellow card) 45+5'; Bard 54'; Sylla 62' (o.g.); Rosario (yellow card) 77'	Report	Bakwa 20'	Stadium: Allianz Riviera; Attendance: 18,389; Referee: Benoît Bastien

30 November 2024 13	Brest	3–1	Strasbourg	Brest
19:00 CET (UTC+1)	Lala 12' (pen.); Baldé (yellow card) 27'; Chardonnet (yellow card) 32'; Ajorque (yellow card) 43', (penalty missed) 52'; Pereira Lage 45+1'; Del Castillo 90+2'	Report	Mara (yellow card) 41'; Moreira (yellow card) 74'; Ouattara 85'	Stadium: Stade Francis-Le Blé; Attendance: 14,600; Referee: Romain Lissorgue

8 December 2024 14	Strasbourg	0–0	Reims	Strasbourg
17:00 CET (UTC+1)	Doukouré (yellow card) 36'	Report	Atangana (yellow card) 39'; Kipré (yellow card) 76'	Stadium: Stade de la Meinau; Attendance: 19,369; Referee: Thomas Léonard

15 December 2024 15	Le Havre	0–3	Strasbourg	Le Havre
17:00 CET (UTC+1)	Doukouré (yellow card) 36'	Report	Diarra 28'; Nanasi 32'; Sobol (yellow card) 36'; Andrey Santos 90'	Stadium: Stade Océane; Attendance: 17,071; Referee: Abdelatif Kherradj

5 January 2025 16	Strasbourg	3–1	Auxerre	Strasbourg
15:00 CET (UTC+1)	Emegha (yellow card) 45+1', (goal) 87'; Diarra 45+4'; Lemaréchal 59'	Report	Traorè 14'; Jubal (yellow card) 45+3'; Akpa (yellow card) 51'	Stadium: Stade de la Meinau; Attendance: 19,471; Referee: Florent Batta

12 January 2025 17	Toulouse	1–2	Strasbourg	Toulouse
17:15 CET (UTC+1)	Akdağ (yellow card) 7'; Doukouré 35' (o.g.)	Report	Emegha 14', 26'; Sarr (yellow card) 42'; Andrey Santos (yellow card) 74'; Bakwa (yellow card) 77'; Sobol (yellow card) 90+2'	Stadium: Stadium de Toulouse; Attendance: 22,042; Referee: Benoît Bastien

29 January 2025 18	Marseille	1–1	Strasbourg	Marseille
20:45 CET (UTC+1)	Greenwood 68' (pen.); Lirola (yellow card) 71'; Vaz (yellow card) 90+3'; Brassier (yellow card) 90+5'	Report	Emegha 23', (yellow card) 26'; Doué (yellow card) 28'; Lemaréchal (yellow card) 42'	Stadium: Stade Vélodrome; Attendance: 63,992; Referee: Bastien Dechepy

25 January 2025 19	Strasbourg	2–1	Lille	Strasbourg
19:00 CET (UTC+1)	Doukouré (yellow card) 19'; Andrey Santos (yellow card) 37', (goal) 70'; Diarra (yellow card) 64'; Ouattara (yellow card) 65'; Emegha 74'	Report	Sahraoui 8'; Gudmundsson (yellow card) 33'; Bakker (yellow card) 76'	Stadium: Stade de la Meinau; Attendance: 19,428; Referee: Willy Delajod

2 February 2025 20	Rennes	1–0	Strasbourg	Rennes
17:15 CET (UTC+1)	Cissé (yellow card) 15'; Samba (yellow card) 71'; James (yellow card) 85'; Blas 89'	Report	Moreira (yellow card) 75'; Doukouré (yellow card) 85'; Diarra (yellow card) 90+1'	Stadium: Roazhon Park; Attendance: 26,621; Referee: Stéphanie Frappart

9 February 2025 21	Strasbourg	2–0	Montpellier	Strasbourg
17:15 CET (UTC+1)	Emegha 45+2'; Nanasi 69'; Andrey Santos (yellow card) 77'	Report	Sagnan (yellow card) 19'; Meïté (yellow card) 73'; Khazri (yellow card) 80'; Maamma (yellow card) 87'	Stadium: Stade de la Meinau; Attendance: 19,042; Referee: Jérémy Stinat

16 February 2025 22	Lens	0–2	Strasbourg	Lens
17:15 CET (UTC+1)	Fulgini (yellow card) 4'; Machado (yellow card) 57' (yellow-red card) 72'; El Aynaoui (yellow card) 85'	Report	Bakwa 81'; Lemaréchal (yellow card) 90+3'; Emegha 90+6', (yellow card) 90+7'	Stadium: Stade Bollaert-Delelis; Attendance: 38,113; Referee: Benoît Millot

23 February 2025 23	Strasbourg	0–0	Brest	Strasbourg
17:15 CET (UTC+1)	Bakwa (yellow card) 28'; Barco (yellow card) 31'; Diarra (yellow card) 64'	Report	Coulibaly (yellow card) 43'	Stadium: Stade de la Meinau; Attendance: 19,042; Referee: Clément Turpin

2 March 2025 24	Auxerre	0–1	Strasbourg	Auxerre
17:15 CET (UTC+1)	Akpa (yellow card) 63'	Report	Barco (yellow card) 17'; Emegha 47'; Bakwa (yellow card) 76'; Petrović (yellow card) 90+4'; Sylla (red card) 90+6'	Stadium: Stade de l'Abbé-Deschamps; Attendance: 16,495; Referee: Mathieu Vernice

9 March 2025 25	Nantes	0–1	Strasbourg	Nantes
18:15 CET (UTC+1)	Douglas Augusto (yellow card) 40'	Report	Sarr (yellow card) 7'; Lemaréchal 79'	Stadium: Stade de la Beaujoire; Attendance: 27,645; Referee: Hakim Ben El Hadj

16 March 2025 26	Strasbourg	2–1	Toulouse	Strasbourg
18:15 CET (UTC+1)	Lemaréchal 47'; Andrey Santos 54'	Report	Magri 3', (yellow card) 24'; Cásseres (yellow card) 28'	Stadium: Stade de la Meinau; Attendance: 19,128; Referee: Florent Batta

28 March 2025 27	Strasbourg	4–2	Lyon	Strasbourg
21:45 CET (UTC+1)	Andrey Santos 55', (yellow card) 66'; Bakwa 60'; Emegha 73', (yellow card) 82'; Amo-Ameyaw 89'	Report	Tolisso 62'; Cherki (yellow card) 82'; Tessmann (yellow card) 83'; Mikautadze 90+6' (pen.)	Stadium: Stade de la Meinau; Attendance: 19,496; Referee: Romain Lissorgue

6 April 2025 28	Reims	0–1	Strasbourg	Reims
17:15 CEST (UTC+2)	Koné (yellow card) 43'; Itō (yellow card) 90+7'; Gbane (red card) 90+8'	Report	Doukouré 4'; Bakwa (yellow card) 60'; Andrey Santos (yellow card) 84'; Moreira (red card) 90+8'	Stadium: Stade Auguste-Delaune; Attendance: 16,254; Referee: Clément Turpin

12 April 2025 29	Strasbourg	2–2	Nice	Strasbourg
21:05 CEST (UTC+2)	Emegha 51'; Amo-Ameyaw 54'; Omobamidele (yellow card) 56'	Report	Bard 38'; Boudaoui (yellow card) 73'; Rosario (yellow card) 90+2'; Ndayishimiye 90+4'	Stadium: Stade de la Meinau; Attendance: 19,210; Referee: Jérémie Pignard

19 April 2025 30	Monaco	0–0	Strasbourg	Monaco
19:00 CEST (UTC+2)	Caio Henrique (yellow card) 12'; Camara (yellow card) 38'; Minamino (yellow card) 69'	Report	Doukouré (yellow card) 13'; Doué (yellow card) 24'; Omobamidele (yellow card) 48'	Stadium: Stade Louis II; Attendance: 12,825; Referee: Eric Wattellier

26 April 2025 31	Strasbourg	3–1	Saint-Étienne	Strasbourg
17:00 CEST (UTC+2)	Moreira 7'; Omobamidele (yellow card) 37'; Emegha 63'; Bakwa 83'	Report	Davitashvili 19'	Stadium: Stade de la Meinau; Attendance: 19,603; Referee: Benoît Bastien

3 May 2025 32	Strasbourg	2–1	Paris Saint-Germain	Strasbourg
17:00 CEST (UTC+2)	Hernandez 20' (o.g.); Lemaréchal 45+3'; Doué (yellow card) 86'	Report	Barcola 46'; Tape (yellow card) 83'; Fabián (yellow card) 89'	Stadium: Stade de la Meinau; Attendance: 19,522; Referee: Hakim Ben El Hadj

10 May 2025 33	Angers	2–1	Strasbourg	Angers
21:00 CEST (UTC+2)	Lepaul 15', 48'; Lefort (yellow card) 61'; Fofana (yellow card) 90+5'	Report	Sarr (yellow card) 45'; Bakwa 43'; Andrey Santos (yellow card) 83'	Stadium: Stade Raymond Kopa; Attendance: 14,391; Referee: Clément Turpin

17 May 2025 34	Strasbourg	2–3	Le Havre	Strasbourg
21:00 CEST (UTC+2)	Andrey Santos 20'; Nanasi 53', (yellow card) 83'; Omobamidele (yellow card) 90+5' (yellow-red card) 90+7'; Amo-Ameyaw (yellow card) 90+7'	Report	Touré 43' (pen.), 90+9' (pen.); Casimir 70'; Négo (yellow card) 90+10'	Stadium: Stade de la Meinau; Attendance: 19,280; Referee: Jérôme Brisard

=== Coupe de France ===
21 December 2024 Round of 64	Calais	0–3	Strasbourg	Calais
21:00 CET (UTC+1)		Report	Andrey Santos 57'; Mara 73', 89'	Stadium: Stade de l'Épopée; Attendance: 9,426; Referee: Thierry Bouille

15 January 2025 Round of 32	Thaon	2–2 (3–5 p)	Strasbourg	Épinal
18:30 CET (UTC+1)	Villa 32'; Leroy 45+2'	Report	Messi 20', 26'	Stadium: Stade de la Colombière; Attendance: 3,153; Referee: Bastien Dechepy

5 February 2025 Round of 16	Strasbourg	1–3	Angers	Strasbourg
20:45 CET (UTC+1)	Lemaréchal 13'	Report	Lepaul 2', 15'; El Melali 76'	Stadium: Stade de la Meinau; Attendance: 15,043; Referee: Eric Wattellier
