= Habib Diarra =

Senegalese footballer (born 2004)

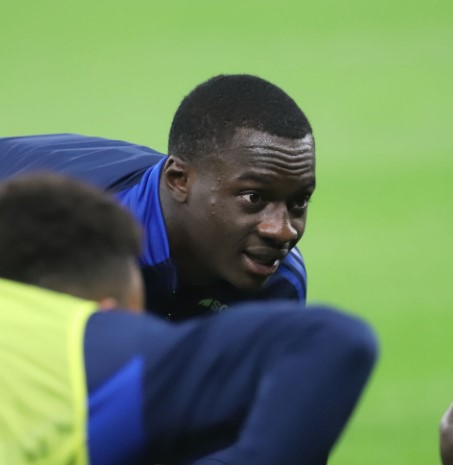
- Diarra with Strasbourg in 2024

Personal information
- Full name: Mouhamadou Habib Mbacke Diarra
- Date of birth: 3 January 2004 (age 22)
- Place of birth: Guédiawaye, Senegal
- Height: 1.79 m (5 ft 10 in)
- Position: Midfielder

Team information
- Current team: Sunderland
- Number: 19

Youth career
- 2011–2018: Mulhouse
- 2018–2021: Strasbourg

Senior career*
Years	Team	Apps	(Gls)
2021–2025	Strasbourg	92	(9)
2021–2022	→ Strasbourg B	7	(1)
2025–	Sunderland	23	(2)

International career^{‡}
2020	France U16	3	(1)
2021	France U18	5	(1)
2022	France U19	3	(0)
2023	France U21	3	(0)
2024–	Senegal	24	(6)
Medal record
Men's football
Representing Senegal
Africa Cup of Nations
Runner-up	2025
- * Club domestic league appearances and goals as of 25 October 2026 ‡ National team caps and goals as of 1 July 2026

Mouhamadou Habib Mbacke Diarra (born 3 January 2004) is a French-Senegalese professional footballer who plays as a midfielder for Premier League club Sunderland and the Senegal national team.

== Club career ==
=== Strasbourg ===
A youth product of Mulhouse and Strasbourg, Diarra signed his first professional contract with Strasbourg on 18 August 2021. He made his professional debut with Strasbourg in a 5–1 Ligue 1 win over Saint-Étienne on 17 October 2021.

On July 21, 2022, Diarra extended his contract with Racing until June 2027.

On April 16, 2023, Diarra scored his first professional goal in Ligue 1 during the 31st matchday of the 2022–23 season, finding the net in the 71st minute against AC Ajaccio, less than ten minutes after coming on as a substitute.

On November 23, 2023, Strasbourg announced a one-year extension of Diarra's contract, which now runs until June 2028.

=== Sunderland ===
On 1 July 2025, Diarra moved to Premier League side Sunderland, signing a five-year contract.

== International career ==
Born in Senegal, Diarra moved to France at a young age. He was a youth international for France, having represented the France U16s and U18s. In March 2024, Diarra accepted a call-up from Aliou Cissé, thereby transferring to Senegal.

He made his debut for the senior Senegal national team on 22 March 2024 in a friendly against Gabon.

In January 2026, following Senegal's victory at the 2025 Africa Cup of Nations, he was received by the mayor of Mulhouse.

On 21 May 2026, Diarra was officially selected by Senegal's coach Pape Thiaw from his list of 28 players to participate in the 2026 FIFA World Cup.

== Career statistics ==
=== Club ===
As of match played 28 October 2026

Appearances and goals by club, season and competition
Club	Season	League			National cup (Note: Includes Coupe de France, FA Cup)		League cup		Europe		Total	
Club	Season	Division	Apps	Goals	Apps	Goals	Apps	Goals	Apps	Goals	Apps	Goals
Strasbourg B	2021–22	Championnat National 2	6	1	—		—		—		6	1
Strasbourg B	2022–23	Championnat National 2	1	0	—		—		—		1	0
Strasbourg B	Total		7	1	—		—		—		7	1
Strasbourg	2021–22	Ligue 1	4	0	0	0	—		—		4	0
Strasbourg	2022–23	Ligue 1	29	3	1	0	—		—		30	3
Strasbourg	2023–24	Ligue 1	31	2	3	1	—		—		34	3
Strasbourg	2024–25	Ligue 1	28	4	3	0	—		—		31	4
Strasbourg	Total		92	9	7	1	—		—		99	10
Sunderland	2025–26	Premier League	20	2	2	1	0	0	—		22	3
Sunderland	2026–27	Premier League	3	0	0	0	1	0	1 (Note: Appearances in UEFA Europa League)	0	5	0
Sunderland	Total		23	2	2	1	1	0	1	0	27	3
Career total			122	12	9	2	1	0	1	0	133	14

=== International ===
As of match played 1 July 2026

Appearances and goals by national team and year
National team	Year	Apps	Goals
Senegal	2024	9	3
Senegal	2025	5	1
Senegal	2026	10	2
Total		24	6

Scores and results list Senegal's goal tally first, score column indicates score after each Diarra goal.

List of international goals scored by Habib Diarra
No.	Date	Venue	Opponent	Score	Result	Competition	Ref.
1	14 November 2024	Stade du 26 Mars, Bamako, Mali	Burkina Faso	1–0	1–0	2025 Africa Cup of Nations qualification	
2	19 November 2024	Diamniadio Olympic Stadium, Diamniadio, Senegal	Burundi	1–0	2–0	2025 Africa Cup of Nations qualification	
3	19 November 2024	Diamniadio Olympic Stadium, Diamniadio, Senegal	Burundi	2–0	2–0	2025 Africa Cup of Nations qualification	
4	10 June 2025	City Ground, Nottingham, England	England	2–1	3–1	Friendly	
5	26 June 2026	BMO Field, Toronto, Canada	Iraq	1–0	5–0	2026 FIFA World Cup	
6	1 July 2026	Lumen Field, Seattle, United States	Belgium	1–0	2–3 (a.e.t.)	2026 FIFA World Cup	
