= Clément Akpa =

Ivorian footballer (born 2001)

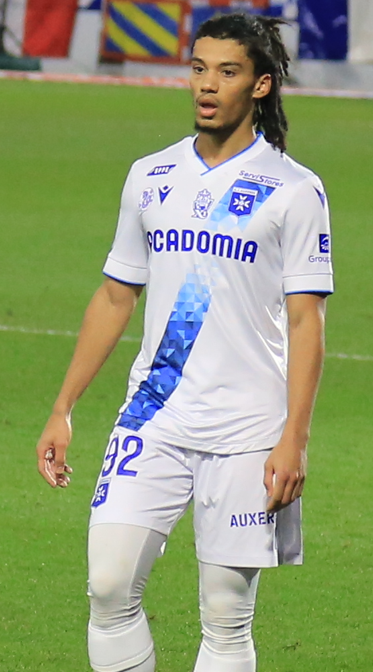
- Akpa with Auxerre in 2025

Personal information
- Date of birth: 24 November 2001 (age 24)
- Place of birth: Meudon, France
- Height: 1.81 m (5 ft 11 in)
- Position: Left-back

Team information
- Current team: Auxerre
- Number: 92

Youth career
- US Vandoeuvre
- Montrouge FC
- 2018–2019: Metz

Senior career*
Years	Team	Apps	(Gls)
2019–2021	Metz II	17	(0)
2021–2022	Auxerre II	28	(1)
2022–	Auxerre	80	(0)
2022–2023	→ Orléans (loan)	20	(1)
2023	→ Orléans II (loan)	1	(0)

International career^{‡}
2025–	Ivory Coast	2	(0)
- * Club domestic league appearances and goals as of 20 May 2026 ‡ National team caps and goals as of 26 March 2025

Clément Akpa (born 24 November 2001) is a professional footballer who plays as a left-back for Ligue 1 club Auxerre. Born in France, he plays for the Ivory Coast national team.

== Club career ==
Akpa is a product of the youth academies of US Vandoeuvre, Montrouge FC and FC Metz. He began his senior career with the reserves of Metz in 2019. On 31 May 2021, he moved to the reserves of Auxerre. On 3 June 2022, he signed his first professional contract with Auxerre for 2 seasons. On 6 July 2022, he joined Orléans on loan for a full season in the Championnat National. On 11 June 2023, he extended his contract with Auxerre until 2026 and was promoted to their senior team for the 2022–23 Ligue 2 season.

== International career ==
Akpa was included in the Ivory Coast's 26-man squad for the 2026 FIFA World Cup. He later withdrew from the tournament due to injury and was replaced by Christopher Opéri.

== Personal life ==
Born in France, Akpa is of Ivorian descent.

== Honours ==
Auxerre

- Ligue 2: 2023–24
