= 2021–22 Paris FC season =

Paris FC
2021–22 season
- President: Pierre Ferracci
- Head coach: Thierry Laurey
- Stadium: Stade Sébastien Charléty
- Ligue 2: 4th
- Coupe de France: Round of 64
- Top goalscorer: League: Morgan Guilavogui (11); All: Morgan Guilavogui (14)
- Biggest win: Paris FC 14–0 CSC Cayenne
- Biggest defeat: Niort 4–1 Paris FC; Nancy 3–0 Paris FC
Home colours	Away colours

The 2021–22 season was the 53rd season in the existence of Paris FC and the club's fifth consecutive season in the second division of French football. In addition to the domestic league, Paris FC are participating in this season's edition of the Coupe de France. The club was expelled from the domestic cup due to crowd trouble during their round of 64 game against Olympique Lyonnais.

== Players ==
=== First-team squad ===
Note: Flags indicate national team as defined under FIFA eligibility rules; some limited exceptions apply. Players may hold more than one non-FIFA nationality.

No.	Pos.	Nation	Player
1	GK	FRA	Vincent Demarconnay (captain)
2	DF	FRA	Maxime Bernauer
3	DF	FRA	Jaouen Hadjam
4	MF	FRA	Ousmane Camara
5	MF	SEN	Moustapha Name
8	MF	FRA	Yohan Demoncy
9	FW	FRA	Lamine Diaby-Fadiga
10	MF	URU	Jonathan Iglesias
11	MF	FRA	Alimami Gory (on loan from Cercle Brugge)
13	FW	MAR	Khalid Boutaïb
14	MF	MTQ	Cyril Mandouki
15	DF	CIV	Axel Bamba
16	GK	FRA	Obed Nkambadio
17	DF	FRA	Hugo Gambor

No.	Pos.	Nation	Player
18	DF	SEN	Youssoupha N'Diaye
19	DF	GUI	Ousmane Kanté
20	MF	ALG	Julien López
21	MF	GUI	Morgan Guilavogui
22	FW	FRA	Warren Caddy
23	MF	FRA	Mahamé Siby (on loan from Strasbourg)
25	FW	FRA	Migouel Alfarela
26	FW	SEN	Lamine Gueye (on loan from Metz)
27	DF	FRA	Thibault Campanini
28	MF	FRA	Check Oumar Diakité
29	DF	FRA	Florent Hanin
31	DF	FRA	Samir Chergui
40	GK	CRO	Ivan Filipović

=== Out on loan ===
Note: Flags indicate national team as defined under FIFA eligibility rules; some limited exceptions apply. Players may hold more than one non-FIFA nationality.

No.	Pos.	Nation	Player
—	MF	FRA	Saïd Arab (on loan to Bastia-Borgo)
—	FW	USA	Patrick Koffi (on loan to Créteil)

No.	Pos.	Nation	Player
—	FW	FRA	Andy Pembélé (on loan to Créteil)
—	FW	FRA	Gaëtan Laura (on loan to Cosenza)

== Transfers ==
=== Out ===
No.	Pos.	Player	Transferred to	Fee	Date	Source
7	FW	(France) Gaëtan Laura	(Italy) Cosenza	Loan	31 January 2022	

== Pre-season and friendlies ==
Win Draw Loss

14 July 2021 Friendly	Reims	1–0	Paris FC	Reims, France
17:00 CEST (UTC+2)	Ekitike 13'	Report		Stadium: Stade Auguste-Delaune

== Competitions ==
=== Overall record ===
Competition	First match	Last match	Starting round	Final position	Record							
Competition	First match	Last match	Starting round	Final position	Pld	W	D	L	GF	GA	GD	Win %
Ligue 2	24 July 2021	14 May 2022	Matchday 1	4th	38	20	10	8	54	35	+19	52.63
Ligue 1 promotion play-offs	17 May 2022		Round 1	Round 1	1	0	0	1	1	2	−1	0.00
Coupe de France	13 November 2021	17 December 2021	Seventh round	Round of 64	2	1	1	0	16	2	+14	50.00
Total					41	21	11	9	71	39	+32	51.22

Source: Soccerway

=== Ligue 2 ===
==== League table ====
Pos	Team	Pld	W	D	L	GF	GA	GD	Pts	Promotion or Relegation
2	Ajaccio (P)	38	22	9	7	39	19	+20	75	Promotion to Ligue 1
3	Auxerre (O, P)	38	21	11	6	61	39	+22	74	Qualification to promotion play-offs
4	Paris FC	38	20	10	8	54	35	+19	70	Qualification to promotion play-offs
5	Sochaux	38	19	11	8	47	34	+13	68	Qualification to promotion play-offs
6	Guingamp	38	15	13	10	52	48	+4	58	

Source: Ligue 2
Rules for classification: 1) Points; 2) Goal difference; 3) Number of goals scored; 4) Head-to-head goal difference; 5) Fair play points
(O) Play-off winners; (P) Promoted

==== Results summary ====
Overall								Home						Away					
Pld	W	D	L	GF	GA	GD	Pts	W	D	L	GF	GA	GD	W	D	L	GF	GA	GD
38	20	10	8	54	35	+19	70	11	7	1	30	13	+17	9	3	7	24	22	+2

Source: Ligue 2

==== Results by round ====
Round	1	2	3	4	5	6	7	8	9	10	11	12	13	14	15	16	17	18	19	20	21	22	23	24	25	26	27	28	29	30	31	32	33	34	35	36	37	38
Ground	A	H	A	H	A	A	H	A	H	A	H	A	H	A	H	A	H	A	H	A	H	A	H	H	A	H	A	H	A	H	A	H	A	H	A	H	A	H
Result	W	W	W	D	L	W	L	L	W	L	D	L	D	W	W	W	W	W	W	D	D	W	W	W	D	W	D	W	L	D	L	D	W	W	L	D	W	W
Position	1	1	1	1	4	2	4	7	5	6	6	8	6	6	6	5	5	4	3	3	4	3	2	2	2	2	2	2	2	2	3	4	4	4	5	5	4	4

Source: Ligue 2
A = Away; H = Home; W = Win; D = Draw; L = Loss

==== Matches ====
The league fixtures were announced on 25 June 2021.

24 July 2021 1	Grenoble	0–4	Paris FC	Grenoble
19:00 CEST (UTC+2)	Bunjaku (yellow card) 74'; Anani (yellow card) 79'	Report	Laura 37'; Perez 52' (o.g.); Name 72'; Alfarela 90+1'	Stadium: Stade des Alpes; Referee: Pierre Gaillouste

31 July 2021 2	Paris FC	2–1	Dunkerque	Paris
19:00 CEST (UTC+2)	Guilavogui 11'; Gakpa 61'	Report	Tchokounté 35'; Huysman (yellow card) 65'	Stadium: Stade Sébastien Charléty; Referee: Guillaume Paradis

7 August 2021 3	Le Havre	1–2	Paris FC	Le Havre
19:00 CEST (UTC+2)	Cornette 59'; Meraş (red card) 81'	Report	Gakpa 23'; Diakité (yellow card) 43'; Laura 63'	Stadium: Stade Océane; Referee: Arnaud Baert

16 August 2021 4	Paris FC	1–1	Auxerre	Paris
20:45 CEST (UTC+2)	Name (yellow card) 15'; Laura 73'; Guilavogui (yellow card) 79'	Report	Léon (yellow card) 53'; Sinayoko (yellow card) 68'; Autret 80' (pen.)	Stadium: Stade Sébastien Charléty; Referee: Nicolas Rainville

28 August 2021 6	Quevilly-Rouen	0–1	Paris FC	Rouen
19:00 CEST (UTC+2)	Cissokho (red card) 30'; Sangaré (yellow card) 66'; Lemaître (yellow card) 68'; Boé-Kane (yellow card) 70'	Report	Alfarela (yellow card) 68'; Guilavogui 77'; Kanté (yellow card) 87'	Stadium: Stade Robert Diochon; Referee: Remi Landry

11 September 2021 7	Paris FC	0–1	Guingamp	Paris
15:00 CEST (UTC+2)		Report	Abi 41'	Stadium: Stade Sébastien Charléty; Referee: Marc Bollengier

14 September 2021 5	Ajaccio	1–0	Paris FC	Ajaccio
19:00 CEST (UTC+2)	Gonzalez 89'	Report	Bernauer (yellow card) 48'; López (penalty missed) 64'; Laura (red card) 90+5'	Stadium: Stade François Coty; Referee: Eric Wattellier

18 September 2021 8	Sochaux	2–0	Paris FC	Montbéliard
15:00 CEST (UTC+2)	Kalulu 10'; Lopy (yellow card) 36'; Bernauer 86' (o.g.)	Report	Kanté (yellow card) 17'; Gory (yellow card) 82'	Stadium: Stade Auguste Bonal; Referee: Jérémie Pignard

21 September 2021 9	Paris FC	2–0	Nîmes	Paris
20:00 CEST (UTC+2)	Name (yellow card) 42'; Kanté 60'; Caddy 74'	Report	Guessoum (yellow card) 39'	Stadium: Stade Sébastien Charléty; Referee: Pierre Gaillouste

24 September 2021 10	Niort	4–1	Paris FC	Niort
21:00 CEST (UTC+2)	Passi 4'; Louiserre 17'; Mendes (yellow card) 59'; Sissoko 72'; Vallier 76'	Report	Kanté (yellow card) 31'; Laura (yellow card) 45'; Tattevin 86'	Stadium: Stade René Gaillard; Referee: Nicolas Rainville

2 October 2021 11	Paris FC	1–1	Nancy	Paris
19:00 CEST (UTC+2)	Guilavogui 19'; Diakité (yellow card) 75'	Report	Akichi (yellow card) 7'; Latouchent 49'; El Kaoutari (yellow card) 62'	Stadium: Stade Sébastien Charléty; Referee: Gaël Angoula

16 October 2021 12	Pau	1–0	Paris FC	Pau
19:00 CEST (UTC+2)	Lobry 37'	Report		Stadium: Nouste Camp; Referee: Arnaud Baert

23 October 2021 13	Paris FC	2–2	Toulouse	Paris
15:00 CEST (UTC+2)	Guilavogui 35'; Caddy 45+1' (pen.); Camara (yellow card) 71'; Laura (yellow card) 78'	Report	Diakité 52', (yellow card) 84'; Healey 85'	Stadium: Stade Sébastien Charléty; Referee: Guillaume Paradis

30 October 2021 14	Dijon	0–1	Paris FC	Dijon
19:00 CEST (UTC+2)	Le Bihan (yellow card) 5'	Report	Deaux 34' (o.g.); Camara (yellow card) 42'; Kanté (yellow card) 66'; Caddy (yellow card) 76'	Stadium: Stade Gaston Gérard; Referee: Frank Schneider

6 November 2021 15	Paris FC	1–0	Rodez	Paris
19:00 CET (UTC+1)	Siby 2'; Caddy (yellow card) 33', (penalty missed) 54'	Report	Boissier (yellow card) 25'; Malanda (red card) 58'; Ouammou (yellow card) 72'	Stadium: Stade Sébastien Charléty; Referee: Mathieu Vernice

20 November 2021 16	Caen	0–1	Paris FC	Caen
19:00 CET (UTC+1)	Wadja (yellow card) 21'; Mendy (yellow card) 69'	Report	Gory 64'; López (yellow card) 73'; Guilavogui (yellow card) 83'	Stadium: Stade Michel d'Ornano; Attendance: 11,635; Referee: Marc Bollengier

3 December 2021 17	Paris FC	1–0	Bastia	Paris
21:00 CET (UTC+1)	Kanté (yellow card) 55'; Name 89' (pen.)	Report	Vincent (yellow card) 34'; Guidi (yellow card) 58'	Stadium: Stade Sébastien Charléty; Referee: Olivier Thual

11 December 2021 18	Valenciennes	1–4	Paris FC	Valenciennes
19:00 CET (UTC+1)	Yatabaré (yellow card) 4'; Cuffaut (yellow card) 5'; Masson (yellow card) 22'; Guillaume (yellow card) 28', (goal) 65'	Report	Name 6' (pen.); Guilavogui 18', (yellow card) 49'; Laura 20'; Siby (yellow card) 26'; Alfarela 80'	Stadium: Stade du Hainaut; Referee: Arnaud Baert

21 December 2021 19	Paris FC	1–0	Amiens	Paris
20:45 CET (UTC+1)	Guilavogui 7'; Kanté (yellow card) 45+1'	Report	Lachuer (yellow card) 90+2'	Stadium: Stade Sébastien Charléty; Referee: Gaël Angoula

17 January 2022 21	Paris FC	2–2	Le Havre	Paris
20:45 CET (UTC+1)	Gory 4'; Diakité 17'; Chergui (yellow card) 87'	Report	Boutaïb 60'; Alioui 63'	Stadium: Stade Sébastien Charléty; Referee: Bartolomeu Varela

28 January 2022 20	Dunkerque	1–1	Paris FC	Dunkirk
19:00 CET (UTC+1)	Yohou (yellow card) 29'; Kikonda (yellow card) 42'; Tchokounté 68' (pen.)	Report	Siby (yellow card) 45'; Iglesias 49'; Bamba (yellow card) 56'; Bernauer (yellow card) 67'	Stadium: Stade Marcel-Tribut; Referee: Nicolas Rainville

1 February 2022 22	Auxerre	1–2	Paris FC	Auxerre
19:00 CET (UTC+1)	Charbonnier 13'; Léon (yellow card) 34'	Report	Guilavogui 35' (pen.), 70'; Hadjam (yellow card) 53'; Iglesias (yellow card) 56'	Stadium: Stade de l'Abbé-Deschamps; Referee: Gaël Angoula

7 February 2022 23	Paris FC	2–0	Ajaccio	Paris
20:45 CET (UTC+1)	Gory 53'; Guilavogui 62' (pen.)	Report		Stadium: Stade Sébastien Charléty; Referee: Hakim Ben El Hadj

12 February 2022 24	Paris FC	3–0	Quevilly-Rouen	Paris
19:00 CET (UTC+1)	Gueye 7'; Guilavogui 41' (pen.); Boutaïb 58' (pen.)	Report		Stadium: Stade Sébastien Charléty; Referee: Benjamin Lepaysant

19 February 2022 25	Guingamp	1–1	Paris FC	Guingamp
19:00 CET (UTC+1)	Gomis 90+3'	Report	López 71'	Stadium: Stade de Roudourou; Referee: Jérôme Miguelgorry

26 February 2022 26	Paris FC	3–1	Sochaux	Paris
15:00 CET (UTC+1)	Siby (yellow card) 64'; Boutaïb 69'; Guilavogui 73'; Gueye 76'	Report	Mauricio 35'; Thioune (yellow card) 80'	Stadium: Stade Sébastien Charléty; Referee: Guillaume Paradis

5 March 2022 27	Nîmes	1–1	Paris FC	Nîmes
15:00 CET (UTC+1)	Martinez (yellow card) 9'; Eliasson 39'; Ferhat (penalty missed) 66'	Report	Boutaïb 24'; Kanté (yellow card) 42'	Stadium: Stade des Costières; Referee: Mathieu Vernice

12 March 2022 28	Paris FC	2–0	Niort	Paris
15:00 CET (UTC+1)	Name (penalty missed) 45+3', 45+3'; Kanté 66'	Report	Sissoko (yellow card) 9'	Stadium: Stade Sébastien Charléty; Referee: Olivier Thual

15 March 2022 29	Nancy	3–0	Paris FC	Tomblaine
20:00 CET (UTC+1)	Biron 10', 43', (yellow card) 62'; El Aynaoui 28'	Report	Gory (yellow card) 79'; Hadjam (yellow card) 86'	Stadium: Stade Marcel Picot; Referee: Jeremy Stinat

19 March 2022 30	Paris FC	1–1	Pau	Paris
20:00 CET (UTC+1)	Koré (yellow card) 18'; Hadjam (yellow card) 51'; Boutaïb 79' (pen.)	Report	Armand 60', (yellow card) 85'; Batisse (yellow card) 75'	Stadium: Stade Sébastien Charléty; Referee: Remy Landry

2 April 2022 31	Toulouse	2–1	Paris FC	Toulouse
15:00 CEST (UTC+2)	Diakité 62'; Evitt-Healey 84'	Report	López 15'	Stadium: Stadium de Toulouse; Referee: Aurelien Petit

11 April 2022 32	Paris FC	2–2	Dijon	Paris
20:45 CEST (UTC+2)	López 56' (yellow card) 63' (goal) 64'; Bamba (yellow card) 76'; Boutaïb (yellow card) 90+3'	Report	Scheidler 27'; Philippoteaux 71'; Coulibaly (yellow card) 75'	Stadium: Stade Sébastien Charléty; Referee: Olivier Thual

16 April 2022 33	Rodez	0–1	Paris FC	Rodez
19:00 CEST (UTC+2)		Report	Name 11'	Stadium: Stade Paul-Lignon; Referee: Frank Schneider

19 April 2022 34	Paris FC	1–0	Caen	Paris
20:00 CEST (UTC+2)	Caddy (yellow card) 15'; Name 26'; Mandouki (yellow card) 42'	Report	Sy (yellow card) 58'; Alexandre Mendy (yellow card) 74'; Diani (yellow card) 89'	Stadium: Stade Sébastien Charléty; Referee: Remi Landry

22 April 2022 35	Bastia	2–1	Paris FC	Furiani
21:00 CEST (UTC+2)	Guidi 15' 45+1'; Sainati (yellow card) 39'	Report	Camara (yellow card) 55'; Guilavogui (yellow card) 69'; Name 81'	Stadium: Stade Armand-Cesari; Referee: Abdelatif Kherradji

30 April 2022 36	Paris FC	1–1	Valenciennes	Paris
19:00 CEST (UTC+2)	Alfarela 11'; Siby (yellow card) 34'; Guilavogui (yellow card) 49'; Bernauer (yellow card) 57'; Boutaïb (yellow card) 70'	Report	Hamache 3'; Debuchy (yellow card) 90+7'	Stadium: Stade Sébastien Charléty; Referee: Guillaume Paradis

7 May 2022 37	Amiens SC	1–2	Paris FC	Amiens
19:00 CEST (UTC+2)	Arokodare (yellow card) 78'; Badji 78'; Bamba (yellow card) 82'; Fofana (Mali) (yellow card) 90+5'	Report	Chergui 50'; Camara (yellow card) 61'; Mandouki 71'; Hanin (yellow card) 82'; Alfarela (yellow card) 90+5'	Stadium: Stade de la Licorne; Referee: Alexandre Perreau Niel

14 May 2022 38	Paris FC	2–0	Grenoble	Paris
19:00 CEST (UTC+2)	Bernauer 52'; López 56'	Report	Gaspar (yellow card) 20'; Anani (yellow card) 89'	Stadium: Stade Sébastien Charléty; Referee: Marc Bollengier

==== Promotion play-offs ====
17 May 2022 Round 1	Paris FC	1–2	Sochaux	Paris
20:30 CEST (UTC+2)	Name (penalty missed) 3', (yellow card) 27' (yellow-red card) 43'; Siby 8'; Alfarela (penalty missed) 12'; Camara (yellow card) 67'; Iglesias (yellow card) 73'	Report	Diedhiou (yellow card) 2'; Ambri 45+1'; Weissbeck (yellow card) 62'; Do Couto 90+2'	Stadium: Stade Sébastien Charléty; Referee: Jérémie Pignard

=== Coupe de France ===
14 November 2021 Seventh round	CS Sedan Ardennes	2–2 (3–5 p)	Paris FC	Sedan
16:00 CET (UTC+1)	Colin 11'; Géran 52'	Report	Diakité 27'; Caddy 76'	Stadium: Stade Louis Dugauguez; Referee: Alexandre Perreau Niel

27 November 2021 Eighth round	Paris FC	14–0	(French Guiana) CSC Cayenne	Paris 13e
18:00 CET (UTC+1)	Name 29', 45', 53'; Diakité 56'; Diaby-Fadiga 65', 70', 78'; Alfarela 71', 77'; Guilavogui 75', 84', 87'; Laura 81', 89'	Report		Stadium: Stade Sébastien Charléty; Referee: Jérôme Miguelgorry

17 December 2021 Round of 64	Paris FC	Abandoned	Lyon	Paris
21:00 CET (UTC+1)				Stadium: Stade Sébastien Charléty; Referee: Jérémy Stinat
Note: Match abandoned after half time with score 1–1 due to crowd trouble. On 27 December 2021, the French Football Federation announced that both Paris FC and Lyon were disqualified from the cup, with Paris FC playing their next five home matches outside of their Stade Charléty home ground.
