= 2020–21 Paris FC season =

Paris FC
2020–21 season
- Chairman: Pierre Ferracci
- Manager: René Girard
- Stadium: Stade Charléty
- Ligue 2: 5th
- Coupe de France: Round of 64
- Top goalscorer: League: Ali Abdi (9); All: Ali Abdi (9)
Home colours	Away colours

The 2020–21 Paris FC season was the club's 51st season in existence and its fourth consecutive season in the second division of French football. In addition to the domestic league, Paris FC participated in this season's edition of the Coupe de France. The season covered the period from 1 July 2020 to 30 June 2021.

== Players ==
=== First-team squad ===
As of 10 February 2021

Note: Flags indicate national team as defined under FIFA eligibility rules; some limited exceptions apply. Players may hold more than one non-FIFA nationality.

No.	Pos.	Nation	Player
1	GK	FRA	Vincent Demarconnay (captain)
2	DF	TUN	Ali Abdi
3	DF	FRA	Jaouen Hadjam
4	MF	FRA	Ousmane Camara
5	MF	SEN	Moustapha Name
6	MF	FRA	Saïd Arab
7	FW	FRA	Gaëtan Laura
8	MF	FRA	Mario-Jason Kikonda
9	FW	FRA	Lamine Diaby-Fadiga
11	MF	FRA	Florian Martin
12	MF	MAD	Lalaïna Nomenjanahary
13	DF	FRA	Gaëtan Belaud
14	MF	MTQ	Cyril Mandouki
15	DF	CIV	Axel Bamba

No.	Pos.	Nation	Player
17	DF	FRA	Hugo Gambor
18	DF	SEN	Youssoupha N'Diaye
19	DF	GUI	Ousmane Kanté
20	MF	ALG	Julien López
21	MF	FRA	Morgan Guilavogui
22	FW	FRA	Warren Caddy
23	MF	FRA	Marvin Gakpa
24	FW	USA	Patrick Koffi
25	FW	FRA	Andy Pembélé
27	DF	FRA	Thibault Campanini
28	MF	FRA	Check Oumar Diakité
29	DF	FRA	Florent Hanin
31	MF	FRA	Samir Chergui

== Pre-season and friendlies ==
Win Draw Loss

11 July 2020 Friendly	Caen	0–1	Paris FC	Venoix, France
18:00 CEST (UTC+2)		Report	Martin 28' (pen.)	Stadium: Terrain Annexe 3

15 July 2020 Friendly	Le Mans	1–3	Paris FC	Orly, France
18:00 CEST (UTC+2)	Bernauer 59' (o.g.)	Report	Diaby-Fadiga 13', 25'; Bernauer 73'	Stadium: Centre d'entrainement Paris FC

18 July 2020 Friendly	Paris FC	0–2	Dijon	Migennes, France
18:00 CEST (UTC+2)		Report	Scheidler 19'; Tavares 69'	Stadium: Stade Lucien Masson

1 August 2020 Friendly	Paris FC	2–0	Red Star	Orly, France
16:00 CEST (UTC+2)	Bamba 32'; Diaby-Fadiga 90'	Report		Stadium: Centre d'entrainement Paris FC

5 August 2020 Friendly	Lens	1–2	Paris FC	Billy-Montigny, France
18:30 CEST (UTC+2)	Clauss (yellow card) 18'; Badé (yellow card) 22'; Sotoca 45'; Cahuzac (yellow card) 59'; Gradit (yellow card) 78'	Report	Laura 22' (pen.); Mandouki 62'	Stadium: Stade Paul Guerre; Attendance: 0

8 August 2020 Friendly	Paris FC	2–1	Troyes	Orly, France
18:00 CEST (UTC+2)	López 48'; Gakpa 70'	Report	Tardieu 11' (pen.)	Stadium: Centre d'entrainement Paris FC

14 August 2020 Friendly	Paris FC	Cancelled	Chambly	Paris, France
19:00 CEST (UTC+2)				Stadium: Stade Sébastien Charléty

14 August 2020 Friendly	Paris FC	2–0	US Créteil	Paris, France
19:00 CEST (UTC+2)	Gakpa 64' (pen.); López 77' (pen.)	Report		Stadium: Stade Sébastien Charléty

== Competitions ==
=== Overview ===
Competition	First match	Last match	Starting round	Final position	Record							
Competition	First match	Last match	Starting round	Final position	Pld	W	D	L	GF	GA	GD	Win %
Ligue 2	22 August 2020	15 May 2021	Matchday 1	5th	38	17	13	8	53	37	+16	44.74
Ligue 2 promotion play-offs	18 May 2021		Round 1	Round 1	1	0	0	1	0	2	−2	0.00
Coupe de France	19 January 2021	9 February 2021	Eighth round	Round of 64	2	1	0	1	2	2	+0	50.00
Total					41	18	13	10	55	41	+14	43.90

Source: Soccerway

=== Ligue 2 ===
==== League table ====
Pos	Team	Pld	W	D	L	GF	GA	GD	Pts	Promotion or Relegation
3	Toulouse	38	20	10	8	71	42	+29	70	Qualification to promotion play-offs
4	Grenoble	38	18	11	9	51	35	+16	65	Qualification to promotion play-offs
5	Paris FC	38	17	13	8	53	37	+16	64	Qualification to promotion play-offs
6	Auxerre	38	16	14	8	64	43	+21	62	
7	Sochaux	38	12	15	11	45	37	+8	51	

Source: Ligue 2
Rules for classification: 1) Points; 2) Goal difference; 3) Number of goals scored; 4) Head-to-head goal difference; 5) Fair play points

==== Results summary ====
Overall								Home						Away					
Pld	W	D	L	GF	GA	GD	Pts	W	D	L	GF	GA	GD	W	D	L	GF	GA	GD
38	17	13	8	53	37	+16	64	11	5	3	31	18	+13	6	8	5	22	19	+3

Source: Ligue 2

==== Results by round ====
Round	1	2	3	4	5	6	7	8	9	10	11	12	13	14	15	16	17	18	19	20	21	22	23	24	25	26	27	28	29	30	31	32	33	34	35	36	37	38
Ground	A	H	A	H	A	H	H	A	H	A	H	A	H	A	H	A	H	A	H	A	H	A	H	A	A	H	A	H	A	H	A	H	A	H	A	H	A	H
Result	W	W	W	L	D	W	W	W	W	W	L	D	D	L	D	L	W	L	D	L	W	D	D	L	D	W	W	W	D	W	W	D	D	L	D	W	D	W
Position	1	1	1	3	2	1	1	1	1	1	1	1	2	3	3	5	5	6	6	6	6	6	6	6	6	6	6	5	5	5	5	5	5	5	6	5	5	5

Source: Ligue 2
A = Away; H = Home; W = Win; D = Draw; L = Loss

==== Matches ====
The league fixtures were announced on 9 July 2020.

22 August 2020 1	Chambly	0–3	Paris FC	Beauvais
19:00 CEST (UTC+2)		Report	Laura 9'; Nomenjanahary (yellow card) 24'; Belaud (yellow card) 31'; Martin 73', 90+6'; Koffi (red card) 80'	Stadium: Stade Pierre Brisson; Referee: Gaël Angoula

29 August 2020 2	Paris FC	1–0	Valenciennes	Paris
19:00 CEST (UTC+2)	Laura 47'	Report		Stadium: Stade Sébastien Charléty; Referee: Guillaume Paradis

12 September 2020 3	Amiens	1–2	Paris FC	Amiens
19:00 CEST (UTC+2)	Mendoza 71' (pen.)	Report	López 40'; Name 57'	Stadium: Stade de la Licorne; Referee: Arnaud Baert

19 September 2020 4	Paris FC	0–2	Nancy	Paris
19:00 CEST (UTC+2)		Report	Biron 74'; Barka 90+4'	Stadium: Stade Sébastien Charléty; Attendance: 2,446; Referee: Mathieu Vernice

26 September 2020 5	Niort	2–2	Paris FC	Niort
19:00 CEST (UTC+2)	Kemen 36', 54'	Report	Martin 58' (pen.); Kanté 88'	Stadium: Stade René Gaillard; Attendance: 2,419; Referee: Benjamin Lepaysant

3 October 2020 6	Paris FC	3–0	Le Havre	Paris
19:00 CEST (UTC+2)	Abdi 33'; López 56' 77'	Report	Gibaud (yellow card) 78'	Stadium: Stade Sébastien Charléty; Attendance: 995; Referee: (France) Olivier Thual

17 October 2020 7	Paris FC	1–0	Pau	Paris
19:00 CEST (UTC+2)	Laura (yellow card) 23'; Guilavogui (yellow card) 44'; Kikonda (yellow card) 62'; Arab 78'	Report	Kouassi (yellow card) 55'; Sabaly (yellow card) 83'	Stadium: Stade Sébastien Charléty; Attendance: 847; Referee: (France) Abdelatif Kherradji

24 October 2020 8	Châteauroux	1–2	Paris FC	Châteauroux
19:00 CEST (UTC+2)	Fofana (yellow card) 11'; Cissé (yellow card) 20'; Grange 45+2'; Mulumba (yellow card) 51'; Operi (yellow card) 55'	Report	Belaud (yellow card) 7'; Laura 20' (pen.); Cissé 31' (o.g.); Kanté (yellow card) 90+2'	Stadium: Stade Gaston Petit; Attendance: 3,119; Referee: (France) Romain Delpech

31 October 2020 9	Paris FC	3–1	Caen	Paris
15:00 CEST (UTC+2)	Demarconnay (yellow card) 4'; Nomenjanahary (yellow card) 41'; Kanté 43'; López 49' (pen.); Caddy 70' (pen.)	Report	Oniangué (yellow card) 7'; Bammou 12'; Nsona (yellow card) 32'; Pi (yellow card) 36'; Rivierez (yellow card) 48' (yellow-red card) 60'; Mendy (yellow card) 66'; Beka Beka (yellow card) 69'	Stadium: Stade Sébastien Charléty; Attendance: 0 Referee: (France) Nicolas Rainville

7 November 2020 10	Dunkerque	0–1	Paris FC	Dunkerque
19:00 CEST (UTC+2)	Pierre (yellow card) 19'	Report	Caddy 6'; Abdi (yellow card) 44' (yellow-red card) 90+4'	Stadium: Stade Marcel-Tribut; Attendance: 0 Referee: (France) Pierre Gaillouste

21 November 2020 11	Paris FC	0–3	Auxerre	Paris
19:00 CEST (UTC+2)	Name (yellow card) 35'; Pitroipa (yellow card) 41'; Diakité (yellow card) 53'; N'Diaye (yellow card) 75'	Report	Le Bihan 5' 38'; Dugimont (yellow card) 7' (goal) 9'	Stadium: Stade Sébastien Charléty; Attendance: 0 Referee: (France) Mathieu Vernice

28 November 2020 12	Grenoble Foot 38	0–0	Paris FC	Grenoble
15:00 CEST (UTC+2)	Gaspar (yellow card) 41'; Ravet (yellow card) 75'	Report	Abdi (yellow card) 14'; Guilavogui (yellow card) 17'; Belaud (yellow card) 44'; López (yellow card) 64'	Stadium: Stade des Alpes; Attendance: 0 Referee: (France) Ruddy Buquet

1 December 2020 13	Paris FC	0–0	Sochaux	Paris
19:00 CEST (UTC+2)	Name (yellow card) 67'	Report	Lasme (yellow card) 34'	Stadium: Stade Sébastien Charléty; Attendance: 0 Referee: (France) Abdelatif Kherradji

5 December 2020 14	Troyes	2–1	Paris FC	Troyes
15:00 CEST (UTC+2)	Chambost 31'; Saint-Louis 43'; Giraudon (yellow card) 90+5'	Report	Name 66'; Belaud (yellow card) 89'; Abdi (yellow card) 90+7'; Hanin (yellow card) 90+8'	Stadium: Stade de l'Aube; Referee: (France) Benjamin Lepaysant

12 December 2020 15	Paris FC	1–1	Rodez	Paris
19:00 CEST (UTC+2)	Kanté (yellow card) 2'; Laura (yellow card) 57'; Abdi (yellow card) 69' (goal) 89'	Report	Boissier 4'; Dieng (yellow card) 33'; Sanaia (yellow card) 50'; Bonnet (yellow card) 83'	Stadium: Stade Sébastien Charléty; Attendance: 0 Referee: (France) Guillaume Paradis

19 December 2020 16	Clermont	3–2	Paris FC	Clermont-Ferrand
15:00 CET (UTC+1)	Dossou 7', 22'; Berthomier 52'; Ogier (yellow card) 83'	Report	Ogier 42' (o.g.); López 77'; N'Diaye (yellow card) 85'; Arab (yellow card) 87'	Stadium: Stade Gabriel Montpied; Referee: Jérôme Miguelgorry

22 December 2020 17	Paris FC	3–2	Guingamp	Paris
20:00 CET (UTC+1)	Kikonda (yellow card) 9'; Laura 26'; Gakpa 63'; Name 90'	Report	Sorbon (yellow card) 55'; Fofana (yellow card) 61'; Phaeton 66'; Ngbakoto 82'	Stadium: Stade Sébastien Charléty; Referee: Alexandre Perreau Niel

5 January 2021 18	Toulouse	1–0	Paris FC	Toulouse
20:00 CET (UTC+1)	Rouault (yellow card) 9' (yellow-red card) 32'; Moreira (yellow card) 14'; Dejaegere (yellow card) 18'; Spierings 66'	Report	Diakité (yellow card) 13'; Bamba (red card) 57'	Stadium: Stadium de Toulouse; Referee: Willy Delajod

8 January 2021 19	Paris FC	1–1	Ajaccio	Paris
20:00 CET (UTC+1)	N'Diaye (yellow card) 38'; Belaud (yellow card) 79'; Arab 90'	Report	Moussiti-Oko 31'	Stadium: Stade Sébastien Charléty; Referee: Mehdi Mokhtari

16 January 2021 20	Valenciennes	P–P	Paris FC	Valenciennes
19:00 CET (UTC+1)				Stadium: Stade du Hainaut
Note: Match postponed due to heavy snow.

23 January 2021 21	Paris FC	4–2	Amiens	Paris
19:00 CET (UTC+1)	Kanté 12', (yellow card) 52'; Laura 16'; Boli 34'; Gakpa 48'	Report	Wagué 19'; Bianchini (yellow card) 59'; Lomotey (yellow card) 65'; Ciss 88'	Stadium: Stade Sébastien Charléty; Referee: Bartolomeu Varela

26 January 2021 20	Valenciennes	2–0	Paris FC	Valenciennes
19:00 CET (UTC+1)	Cuffaut (yellow card) 52', (goal) 59'; Cabral 69'	Report	Gakpa (yellow card) 28'; Kanté (yellow card) 36'; Laura (yellow card) 76'	Stadium: Stade du Hainaut; Referee: Arnaud Baert

30 January 2021 22	Nancy	1–1	Paris FC	Tomblaine
19:00 CET (UTC+1)	Biron 14'; Ciss (yellow card) 85'	Report	Boli 28'; Mandouki (yellow card) 35'; Belaud (yellow card) 89'; Kikonda (yellow card) 90+2'	Stadium: Stade Marcel Picot; Referee: Remi Landry

2 February 2021 23	Paris FC	3–3	Niort	Paris
20:00 CET (UTC+1)	Abdi 1', 33'; Martin 9', (yellow card) 54'; Gakpa (yellow card) 45+3'; Laura (penalty missed) 88'	Report	Jacob 20', (yellow card) 50'; Doukansy (yellow card) 34'; Boutobba 38'; Kilama (yellow card) 42' (yellow-red card) 80'; Bâ 55'	Stadium: Stade Sébastien Charléty; Referee: Mehdi Mokhtari

6 February 2021 24	Le Havre	1–0	Paris FC	Le Havre
20:00 CET (UTC+1)	Thiaré 28'	Report	Kikonda (yellow card) 48'; Bamba (yellow card) 51'	Stadium: Stade Océane; Referee: Olivier Thual

13 February 2021 25	Pau	1–1	Paris FC	Pau
19:00 CET (UTC+1)	S. Diarra (yellow card) 13'; Beusnard (yellow card) 39'; Itaitinga 55'; Assifuah (yellow card) 71'	Report	Belaud (yellow card) 31'; López (yellow card) 50'; Abdi 82'	Stadium: Stade du Hameau; Referee: Gaël Angoula

20 February 2021 26	Paris FC	1–0	Châteauroux	Paris
19:00 CET (UTC+1)	Kanté (yellow card) 48'; Abdi 69'; Caddy (yellow card) 88'	Report	Leroy (yellow card) 26'; Opéri (yellow card) 39'; Mulumba (yellow card) 77'; Keny (red card) 84'	Stadium: Stade Sébastien Charléty; Referee: Benjamin Lepaysant

27 February 2021 27	Caen	0–2	Paris FC	Caen
19:00 (CET) (UTC+1)	Gioacchini (yellow card) 30'; Vandermersch (yellow card) 71'	Report	Laura 37'; Hanin (yellow card) 42'; Bamba 86'	Stadium: Stade Michel d'Ornano; Referee: Abdelatif Kherradji

2 March 2021 28	Paris FC	1–0	Dunkerque	Paris
20:00 CET (UTC+1)	Belaud (yellow card) 20'; Boli (yellow card) 45+2'; Laura (yellow card) 66'; Abdi 90+2'	Report	Sy (yellow card) 28'; Kebbal (yellow card) 50'	Stadium: Stade Sébastien Charléty; Referee: Karim Abed

13 March 2021 29	Auxerre	0–0	Paris FC	Auxerre
15:00 CET (UTC+1)	Autret (yellow card) 75'	Report	Nomenjanahary (yellow card) 90+3'	Stadium: Stade de l'Abbé-Deschamps; Referee: Antony Gautier

20 March 2021 30	Paris FC	2–0	Grenoble Foot 38	Paris
20:00 CET (UTC+1)	Gakpa (yellow card) 29'; López (yellow card) 44'; Hanin 66'; Diakité (red card) 69'; Martin 81'	Report		Stadium: Stade Sébastien Charléty; Referee: Nicolas Rainville

3 April 2021 31	Sochaux	1–2	Paris FC	Montbéliard
20:00 CET (UTC+1)	Paye (yellow card) 11'; Weissbeck (yellow card) 32'; Martial (yellow card) 67'; Ndour (yellow card) 83'; Bedia 90+3'	Report	Laura 6'; Kanté (yellow card) 42' (yellow-red card) 58'; Abdi 70'	Stadium: Stade Auguste Bonal; Referee: Romain Delpech

10 April 2021 32	Paris FC	1–1	Troyes	Paris
15:00 CEST (UTC+2)	López 3'; Name (red card) 38'	Report	Saint-Louis 36'; Tardieu (red card) 38'; Mutombo (yellow card) 43'	Stadium: Stade Sébastien Charléty; Referee: Bartolomeu Varela

17 April 2021 33	Rodez	2–2	Paris FC	Rodez
20:00 CEST (UTC+2)	Boissier 5'; Mandouki 56' (o.g.); Chougrani (yellow card) 77'; Bonnet (yellow card) 79'	Report	Caddy 34'; Laura 62'	Stadium: Stade Paul-Lignon; Referee: Olivier Thual

20 April 2021 34	Paris FC	0–1	Clermont	Paris
15:00 CEST (UTC+2)	Nomenjanahary (yellow card) 36'; Abdi (yellow card) 87' (yellow-red card) 87'; Martin (yellow card) 89'	Report	Bayo 51'; Hountondji (yellow card) 70'	Stadium: Stade Sébastien Charléty; Referee: Pierre Gaillouste

24 April 2021 35	Guingamp	0–0	Paris FC	Guingamp
20:00 CEST (UTC+2)	Niakaté (yellow card) 6'; Rodelin (yellow card) 75'; Phiri (yellow card) 79'; Romao (yellow card) 89'	Report	Belaud (yellow card) 66'; Kanté (yellow card) 78'; Martin (penalty missed) 90'	Stadium: Stade de Roudourou; Referee: Sylvain Palhies

1 May 2021 36	Paris FC	3–1	Toulouse	Paris
15:00 CEST (UTC+2)	Martin 12'; Name (yellow card) 22', (goal) 86'; Arab 90+4'	Report	Bayo 16'; Diakité (yellow card) 26'; Spierings (yellow card) 55'; Adli (yellow card) 78'	Stadium: Stade Sébastien Charléty; Referee: Benjamin Lepaysant

8 May 2021 37	Ajaccio	1–1	Paris FC	Ajaccio
20:00 CEST (UTC+2)	Moussiti-Oko 39'; Barreto (yellow card) 55'; Youssouf (yellow card) 57'	Report	Caddy 15'; Kanté (red card) 27'	Stadium: Stade François Coty; Referee: Gaël Angoula

15 May 2021 38	Paris FC	3–0	Chambly	Paris
20:00 CEST (UTC+2)	Abdi (yellow card) 51', (goal) 89'; Mandouki 57'; Belaud (yellow card) 67'; Diaby-Fadiga (yellow card) 83'; López 90+4'	Report	Danger (yellow card) 44'; Dequaire (yellow card) 76' (yellow-red card) 79'	Stadium: Stade Sébastien Charléty; Referee: Jérôme Miguelgorry

==== Promotion play-offs ====
18 May 2021 Round 1	Grenoble	2–0	Paris FC	Grenoble
20:45 CEST (UTC+2)	Anani 8'; Semedo 87'	Report		Stadium: Stade des Alpes; Attendance: 0 (Behind closed doors); Referee: Bastien Depechy

=== Coupe de France ===
19 January 2021 Eighth round	Le Havre	0–1	Paris FC	Le Havre
16:00 CET (UTC+1)		Report	Martin 8'	Stadium: Stade Océane; Attendance: 0 Referee: Alexandre Perreau Niel

9 February 2021 Round of 64	Lorient	2–1	Paris FC	Lorient
18:30 CET (UTC+1)	Hamel (yellow card) 59'; Wissa 72' (pen.); Moffi 83'	Report	Name 13'	Stadium: Stade du Moustoir; Attendance: 0 Referee: Eric Wattellier

== Statistics ==
=== Goalscorers ===
As of 15 May 2021

Rank	No.	Pos	Nat	Name	Ligue 2	Coupe de France	Total
1	2	DF	(Tunisia)	Ali Abdi	9	0	9
2	7	FW	(France)	Gaëtan Laura	8	0	8
3	20	FW	(Algeria)	Julien López	7	0	7
3	11	MF	(France)	Florian Martin	6	1	7
5	5	MF	(Senegal)	Moustapha Name	4	1	5
6	22	FW	(France)	Warren Caddy	4	0	4
7	6	MF	(France)	Saïd Arab	3	0	3
7	19	DF	(Guinea)	Ousmane Kanté	3	0	3
9	32	FW	(France)	Charles Boli	2	0	2
9	10	MF	(France)	Marvin Gakpa	2	0	2
11	15	DF	(Ivory Coast)	Axel Bamba	1	0	1
11	29	DF	(France)	Florent Hanin	1	0	1
11	14	MF	(France)	Cyril Mandouki	1	0	1
Totals					51	2	53
