= 2022–23 ES Sétif season =

ES Sétif
2022–23 season
- President: Abdelhakim Serrar
- Head coach: Hossam El Badry (from 13 July 2022) (until 20 November 2022); Khaled Lemmouchia (from 27 November 2022) (until 8 January 2023); Chiheb Ellili (from 8 January 2023) (until 19 February 2023); Billel Dziri (from 25 February 2023)
- Stadium: 8 May 1945 Stadium
- Ligue 1: 7th
- Algerian Cup: Round of 32
- Top goalscorer: League: Ahmed Kendouci (8 goals); All: Ahmed Kendouci (8 goals)
- Biggest win: HB Chelghoum Laïd 0–6 ES Sétif
- Biggest defeat: ASO Chlef 4–0 ES Sétif
Home colours	Away colours	Third colours

In the 2022–23 season, ES Sétif are competing in the Ligue 1 for the 53rd season and the Algerian Cup. It is their 21st consecutive season in the top flight of Algerian football. They are competing in Ligue 1.

== Season summary ==
On March 6, 2023 the general manager of the company ESS Black Eagles Brahim El Arbaoui indicated that the administration of the club, represented by the chairman of the board of directors Abdelhakim Serrar, will officially enter into negotiations with the Sonelgaz on the possible takeover by this group of the majority of the club's shares. On May 29, 2023 The CEO of Sonelgaz traveled to Setif to meet with the Wali of Setif and the directors of the ES Setif, in order to complete the agreement and buy the majority of the shares in ES Setif.

== Squad list ==
Players and squad numbers last updated on 5 February 2023.
Note: Flags indicate national team as has been defined under FIFA eligibility rules. Players may hold more than one non-FIFA nationality.

No.	Nat.	Position	Name	Date of Birth (Age)	Signed from
Goalkeepers
1	(Algeria)	GK	Mohamed Lotfi Anis Osmani	27 June 1996 (aged 26)	Unattached
16	(Algeria)	GK	Zakaria Bouhalfaya	11 August 1997 (aged 25)	(Algeria) NC Magra
23	(Algeria)	GK	Mokhtar Ferrahi	24 January 1996 (aged 26)	(Algeria) Paradou AC
Defenders
2	(Algeria)	CB	Drice Chaabi	20 September 1997 (aged 25)	(Belgium) Francs Borains
3	(Algeria)	LB	Tarek Belouchat	16 April 1997 (aged 25)	(Algeria) Olympique de Médéa
4	(Algeria)	CB	Ibrahim Hachoud	5 March 2000 (aged 22)	(Algeria) Youth system
5	(Algeria)	RB	Mohamed Khoutir Ziti	19 April 1989 (aged 33)	(Libya) Nasr Benghazi
12	(Algeria)	CB	Hamza Salem	10 January 1998 (aged 24)	(Algeria) US Biskra
13	(Algeria)	CB	Islem Chebbour	22 March 1996 (aged 26)	(Algeria) Paradou AC
22	(Algeria)	LB	Belkacem Brahimi	20 January 1994 (aged 28)	(Algeria) MC Alger
25	(Algeria)	RB	Kheireddine Benamrane	8 July 1994 (aged 28)	(Algeria) HB Chelghoum Laïd
Midfielders
6	(Algeria)	MF	Saïd Arab	23 July 2000 (aged 22)	Unattached
8	(Algeria)	MF	Larbi Tabti	23 April 1993 (aged 29)	(Algeria) CR Belouizdad
10	(Algeria)	MF	Abdelmoumene Djabou	31 January 1987 (aged 35)	(Algeria) MC Alger
14	(Algeria)	MF	Nassim Yattou	27 March 1992 (aged 30)	Unattached
15	(Algeria)	MF	Sami Guediri	18 August 1997 (aged 25)	Unattached
17	(Algeria)	MF	Houssem Ouassni	24 October 1999 (aged 23)	(Algeria) HB Chelghoum Laïd
18	(Algeria)	MF	Bassem Chaouti	May 21, 1991 (aged 31)	(Algeria) MC Oran
19	(Algeria)	MF	Youcef Dali	26 February 1999 (aged 23)	(Algeria) Youth system
20	(Algeria)	MF	Youcef Serraoui	30 March 2000 (aged 22)	(Algeria) MC Saïda
21	(Algeria)	MF	Fouad Ghanem	16 November 1997 (aged 25)	(Algeria) NC Magra
Forwards
7	(Algeria)	FW	Zerroug Boucif	20 September 2000 (aged 22)	(Algeria) Paradou AC
9	(Algeria)	FW	Mohamed Aimen Akziz	1 February 2000 (aged 22)	(Algeria) NA Hussein Dey
11	(Algeria)	FW	Abdelhak Askar	15 December 1997 (aged 25)	(Algeria) RC Kouba
24	(Cameroon)	FW	Nkembe Enow	11 November 1999 (aged 23)	(Mexico) Cancún F.C.
26	(Algeria)	FW	Ghiles Guenaoui	2 August 1998 (aged 24)	(Algeria) Paradou AC
27	(Algeria)	FW	Walid Zamoum	10 June 1997 (aged 25)	(Algeria) JSM Béjaïa

== Transfers ==
=== In ===
==== Summer ====
Date	Pos	Player	From club	Transfer fee	Source
27 July 2022	MF	(Cameroon) Andre Ulrich Zanga	(Cameroon) PWD Bamenda	Free transfer	
27 July 2022	MF	(Algeria) Ayoub Tazouti	(Bulgaria) FC Sportist Svoge	Free transfer	
27 July 2022	CB	(Algeria) Ilias Hassani	(Qatar) Al-Shahania SC	Free transfer	
27 July 2022	LB	(Algeria) Mohamed Riad Hmida	JS Bordj Ménaïel	Free transfer	
27 July 2022	MF	(Algeria) Larbi Tabti	CR Belouizdad	Free transfer	
27 July 2022	FW	(Algeria) Zerroug Boucif	Paradou AC	Loan	
28 July 2022	CB	(Algeria) Mohamed Amar Boudouh	ASM Oran	Free transfer	
28 July 2022	FW	(Algeria) Ghiles Guenaoui	Paradou AC	Free transfer	
28 July 2022	MF	(Algeria) Chahreddine Boukholda	(Portugal) Mafra	Free transfer	
29 July 2022	GK	(Algeria) Mohamed Lotfi Anis Osmani	Unattached	Free transfer	
2 August 2022	FW	(Algeria) Abdelhak Haskar	RC Kouba	Free transfer	
8 August 2022	CB	(Algeria) Islem Chebbour	Paradou AC	Free transfer	
10 August 2022	RB	(Algeria) Kheireddine Benamrane	HB Chelghoum Laïd	Free transfer	
13 August 2022	CB	(Algeria) Drice Chaabi	(Belgium) Francs Borains	Free transfer	
13 August 2022	MF	(Algeria) Youcef Serraoui	MC Saïda	Free transfer	
16 August 2022	FW	(Algeria) Mohamed Aimen Akziz	NA Hussein Dey	Free transfer	
17 August 2022	CB	(Algeria) Hamza Salem	US Biskra	Free transfer	
17 August 2022	FW	(Algeria) Walid Zamoum	JSM Béjaïa	Free transfer	
17 August 2022	CB	(Algeria) Kousseila Temericht	NA Hussein Dey	Free transfer	
18 August 2022	MF	(Algeria) Bassam Chaouti	MC Oran	Free transfer	
18 August 2022	LB	(Algeria) Tarek Belouchat	Olympique de Médéa	Free transfer	
19 August 2022	FW	(Ivory Coast) Alassane Razak Keita	(Kosovo) SC Gjilani	Free transfer	
24 August 2022	MF	(Cameroon) Duval Wapiwo	(Libya) Al-Madina SC	Free transfer	
25 August 2022	MF	(Algeria) Nassim Yettou	Unattached	Free transfer	
25 August 2022	FW	(Nigeria) Godwin Chika	(Iraq) Al-Shorta SC	Free transfer	

==== Winter ====
Date	Pos	Player	From club	Transfer fee	Source
31 January 2023	MF	(Algeria) Saïd Arab	Unattached	Free transfer	
1 February 2023	MF	(Algeria) Sami Guediri	Unattached	Free transfer	
1 February 2023	MF	(Algeria) Fouad Ghanem	NC Magra	Free transfer	
1 February 2023	MF	(Algeria) Houssem Eddine Ouassini	HB Chelghoum Laïd	Free transfer	
1 February 2023	FW	(Algeria) Nkembe Enow	Cancún F.C.	Free transfer	

=== Out ===
==== Summer ====
Date	Pos	Player	To club	Transfer fee	Source
19 June 2022	LB	(Algeria) Houari Ferhani	MC Alger	Free transfer	
1 July 2022	FW	(Algeria) Riad Benayad	Paradou AC	Loan return	
17 July 2022	RB	(Algeria) Abdelhak Debbari	Unattached (Note: Debbari joined HB Chelghoum Laïd on 25 August 2022.)	Free transfer	
20 July 2022	FW	(Algeria) Monsef Bakrar	(Croatia) NK Istra	Free transfer	
23 July 2022	GK	(Algeria) Sofiane Khedairia	(Saudi Arabia) Al-Shoulla FC	Free transfer	
25 July 2022	CB	(Algeria) Hocine Laribi	Unattached (Note: Laribi joined Al-Shoulla FC on 29 July 2022.)	Free transfer	
27 July 2022	FW	(Algeria) Khalil Darfalou	USM Alger	Free transfer	
2 August 2022	RB	(Algeria) Abdelkrim Nemdil	Unattached	Free transfer	
7 August 2022	CB	(Algeria) Ilias Hassani	Unattached	Free transfer	
7 August 2022	MF	(Algeria) Ayoub Tazouti	Unattached	Free transfer	
7 August 2022	LB	(Algeria) Mohamed Riad Hmida	Unattached	Free transfer	
7 August 2022	CB	(Algeria) Mohamed Amar Boudouh	Unattached	Free transfer	
15 August 2022	MF	(Algeria) Abdelkader Boutiche	(Tunisia) US Monastir	Free transfer	
16 August 2022	FW	(Libya) Ibrahim Bodabous	Unattached	Free transfer	
17 August 2022	LB	(Algeria) Younes Abdelhak Ouassaa	MC El Bayadh	Free transfer	
17 August 2022	MF	(Algeria) Chahreddine Boukholda	Unattached	Free transfer	
19 August 2022	MF	(Algeria) Ibrahim Farhi Benhalima	(Morocco) MC Oujda	Free transfer	
22 August 2022	MF	(Algeria) Akram Djahnit	USM Alger	Free transfer	
24 August 2022	MF	(Cameroon) Andre Ulrich Zanga	Unattached	Free transfer	
24 August 2022	MF	(Ivory Coast) Alassane Razak Keita	Unattached	Free transfer	
24 August 2022	FW	(Algeria) Zoubir Motrani	MC Oran	Free transfer	
25 August 2022	MF	(Algeria) Abderrahim Deghmoum	(Egypt) Al Masry SC	275,000 $	
25 August 2022	MF	(Algeria) Amir Karaoui	HB Chelghoum Laïd	Free transfer	
25 August 2022	MF	(Algeria) Amine Benbelaid	CR Témouchent	Free transfer	

==== Winter ====
Date	Pos	Player	To club	Transfer fee	Source
18 December 2022	FW	(Nigeria) Godwin Chika	Unattached	Released	
28 January 2023	MF	(Algeria) Ahmed Kendouci	(Egypt) Al Ahly SC	1,100,000 $	
31 January 2023	MF	(Cameroon) Duval Wapiwo	Unattached	Released	
6 February 2023	CB	(Algeria) Kousseila Temericht	Unattached	Released	

== Competitions ==
=== Overview ===
Competition	Record								Started round	Final position / round	First match	Last match
Competition	G	W	D	L	GF	GA	GD	Win %	Started round	Final position / round	First match	Last match
Ligue 1	30	11	9	10	38	32	+6	36.67	—N/a	6th	27 August 2022	15 July 2023
Algerian Cup	2	1	0	1	6	1	+5	50.00	Round of 64	Round of 32	20 December 2022	14 February 2023
Total	32	12	9	11	44	33	+11	37.50				

Updated to match played 15 July 2023
Source: Competitions

=== Ligue 1 ===
==== League table ====
Pos	Team	Pld	W	D	L	GF	GA	GD	Pts	Qualification or relegation
4	MC El Bayadh	30	13	7	10	34	25	+9	46	
5	JS Saoura	30	11	9	10	32	25	+7	42	
6	ES Sétif	30	11	9	10	38	32	+6	42	
7	ASO Chlef	30	11	9	10	36	31	+5	42	Qualification for CAF Confederation Cup (Note: ASO Chlef qualified for the 2023–24 CAF Confederation Cup by winning the 2022–23 Algerian Cup.)
8	USM Khenchela	30	12	6	12	29	29	0	42	

Updated to match(es) played on 15 July 2023. Source: the-sports.org
Rules for classification: 1) points; 2) head-to-head points; 3) head-to-head goal difference; 4) goal difference; 5) total goals; 6) fairplay ranking; 7) playoff.

==== Results summary ====
Overall								Home						Away					
Pld	W	D	L	GF	GA	GD	Pts	W	D	L	GF	GA	GD	W	D	L	GF	GA	GD
30	11	9	10	38	32	+6	42	7	6	2	21	8	+13	4	3	8	17	24	−7

Last updated: 15 July 2023.
Source: Competitive matches

==== Results by round ====
Round	1	2	3	4	5	6	7	8	9	10	11	12	13	14	15	16	17	18	19	20	21	22	23	24	25	26	27	28	29	30
Ground	A	H	A	H	A	H	A	H	A	H	A	H	A	A	H	H	A	H	A	H	A	H	A	H	A	H	A	H	H	A
Result	D	W	W	D	L	D	D	L	W	W	W	W	L	L	D	W	L	W	L	W	L	W	L	D	W	D	L	L	D	D
Position	8	4	4	4	5	7	9	11	7	5	5	3	3	5	6	3	6	5	6	6	6	4	5	7	3	3	4	6	7	6

Updated to match(es) played on 15 July 2023. Source: Competitive matches
A = Away; H = Home; W = Win; D = Draw; L = Loss

==== Matches ====
The league fixtures were announced on 19 July 2022.

27 August 2022 Round 1	US Biskra	2–2	ES Sétif	Biskra
20:00	Baâli 37'; Siam 47'	Report	Kendouci 1', 84'	Stadium: 18 February Stadium; Referee: Nabil Boukhalfa

3 September 2022 Round 2	ES Sétif	1–0	RC Arbaâ	Sétif
20:00	Zamoum 43'	Report		Stadium: 8 May 1945 Stadium; Referee: Abdellah Benchehida

9 September 2022 Round 3	NC Magra	0–1	ES Sétif	Magra
16:30		Report	Godwin 45+4'	Stadium: Boucheligue Brothers Stadium; Referee: Hamza Bouslimani

24 September 2022 Round 5	ASO Chlef	4–0	ES Sétif	Relizane
16:30	Aguieb 19'; Addadi 26'; Aliane 62'; Souibaâh 73'	Report		Stadium: Tahar Zoughari Stadium; Referee: Lahlou Benbraham

2 October 2022 Round 6	ES Sétif	0–0	CS Constantine	Sétif
18:00		Report		Stadium: 8 May 1945 Stadium; Referee: Lotfi Bekouassa

13 October 2022 Round 8	ES Sétif	1–2	USM Khenchela	Sétif
15:30	Akziz 90+4'	Report	Bayazid 58'; Sameur 90+2' (pen.)	Stadium: 8 May 1945 Stadium; Referee: Bilal Soltani

21 October 2022 Round 9	JS Kabylie	2–3	ES Sétif	Tizi Ouzou
17:00	Harrag 35'; Mouaki 82' (pen.)	Report	Godwin 65'; Guenaoui 90+2'; Tabti 90+5'	Stadium: 1 November 1954 Stadium; Referee: Lahlou Benbraham

25 October 2022 Round 4	ES Sétif	1–1	CR Belouizdad	Sétif
18:00	Kendouci 53'	Report	Bourdim 88'	Stadium: 8 May 1945 Stadium; Referee: Mustapha Ghorbal

5 November 2022 Round 10	ES Sétif	4–0	HB Chelghoum Laïd	Sétif
17:00	Kendouci 23' (pen.), 59'; Guenaoui 66', 72'	Report		Stadium: 8 May 1945 Stadium; Referee: Abderrahmane Mohamed Belkbir

9 November 2022 Round 11	Paradou AC	1–3	ES Sétif	Dar El Beïda
15:00	Zerrouki 90+1'	Report	Zamoum 38'; Kendouci 75', 90+1'	Stadium: Omar Benrabah Stadium; Referee: Abdellah Benchehida

29 November 2022 Round 12	ES Sétif	4–0	MC Oran	Sétif
18:00	Guenaoui 32', 37'; Aouissi 79'; Askar 89'	Report		Stadium: 8 May 1945 Stadium; Referee: El Hadj Aissa Semmache

3 December 2022 Round 7	USM Alger	1–1	ES Sétif	Dar El Beïda
15:00	Zouari 76'	Report	Kendouci 68'	Stadium: Omar Benrabah Stadium; Referee: Bilel Soltani

7 December 2022 Round 13	MC El Bayadh	2–0	ES Sétif	El Bayadh
15:00	Barkat 47'; Moussaoui 60'	Report		Stadium: Zakaria Medjdoub Stadium; Referee: Lyes Bekouassa

11 December 2022 Round 14	MC Alger	1–0	ES Sétif	Dar El Beïda
15:00	Debbih 15'	Report		Stadium: Omar Benrabah Stadium; Referee: Mehadji Tayeb Bouderbali

24 December 2022 Round 15	ES Sétif	0–0	JS Saoura	Sétif
18:00		Report		Stadium: 8 May 1945 Stadium; Referee: Akram Mecharia

10 February 2023 Round 16	ES Sétif	3–1	US Biskra	Sétif
17:00	Zamoum 25'; Guenaoui 50'; Salem 56'	Report	Bouraada 85'	Stadium: 8 May 1945 Stadium; Referee: Youcef Gamouh

19 February 2023 Round 17	RC Arbaâ	3–1	ES Sétif	Larbaâ
15:00	Zaouche 1'; Toumi 68'; Serradj 75'	Report	Chaabi 90+2'	Stadium: Ismaïl Makhlouf Stadium; Referee: Hamza Bouslimani

25 February 2023 Round 18	ES Sétif	2–0	NC Magra	Sétif
17:00	Enow 50'; Guenaoui 70'	Report		Stadium: 8 May 1945 Stadium; Referee: Anes Azrine

18 March 2023 Round 20	ES Sétif	1–0	ASO Chlef	Sétif
15:00	Enow 45'	Report		Stadium: 8 May 1945 Stadium; Referee: Mustapha Ghorbal

31 March 2023 Round 21	CS Constantine	2–0	ES Sétif	Constantine
15:45	Khaldi 4'; Ardji 37'	Report		Stadium: Ramadane Ben Abdelmalek Stadium; Referee: Nabil Boukhalfa

8 April 2023 Round 22	ES Sétif	1–0	USM Alger	Sétif
22:00	Bouchama 59'	Report		Stadium: 8 May 1945 Stadium; Referee: Houssam Benyahia

5 May 2023 Round 19	CR Belouizdad	1–0	ES Sétif	Belouizdad
16:00	Bouras 22'	Report		Stadium: 20 August 1955 Stadium; Referee: Bilel Soltani

17 May 2023 Round 23	USM Khenchela	1–0	ES Sétif	Khenchela
16:00	Omoyele 34'	Report		Stadium: Amar Hamam Stadium; Referee: Anes Azrine

31 May 2023 Round 24	ES Sétif	1–1	JS Kabylie	Sétif
18:00	Askar 74'	Report	Mouaki 13'	Stadium: 8 May 1945 Stadium; Referee: Bilal Soltani

6 June 2023 Round 25	HB Chelghoum Laïd	0–4	ES Sétif	Chelghoum Laïd
16:30		Report	Enow 12', 42', 51'; Askar 45'	Stadium: 11 December 1961 Stadium; Referee: Mohamed Tahar Milia

1 July 2023 Round 26	ES Sétif	0–0	Paradou AC	Sétif
17:00		Report		Stadium: 8 May 1945 Stadium; Referee: Mehadji Tayeb Bouderbali

4 July 2023 Round 27	MC Oran	3–1	ES Sétif	Oran
17:00	Bouguettaya 58'; Saihi 73'; Benhamou 90'	Report	Boucif 90+5'	Stadium: Ahmed Zabana Stadium; Referee: Hamza Bouslimani

7 July 2023 Round 28	ES Sétif	1–2	MC El Bayadh	Sétif
17:15	Yattou 23'	Report	Barkat 43'; Amaouche 65'	Stadium: 8 May 1945 Stadium; Referee: Zinelaabidine Dakhane

10 July 2023 Round 29	ES Sétif	1–1	MC Alger	Sétif
17:15	Boucif 87'	Report	Bouzekri 37'	Stadium: 8 May 1945 Stadium; Referee: Abdelali Ibrir

15 July 2023 Round 30	JS Saoura	1–1	ES Sétif	Béchar
20:00	Salem 11' (o.g.)	Report	Boucif 61'	Stadium: 20 August 1955 Stadium; Referee: Mohamed Belkebir

=== Algerian Cup ===
20 December 2022 Round of 64	HB Chelghoum Laïd	0–6	ES Sétif	Chelghoum Laïd
14:00		Report	Douib 2', 41'; Yattou 28'; Guenaoui 30'; Brahimi 50', 62'	Stadium: 11 December 1961 Stadium; Referee: Malek Aït Ameur
Note: Lineup for ES Sétif - Bouhalfaya, Chaabi, Salem, Benamrane, Brahimi (Temericht, 58'), Yattou (Masaoud Salem, 46'), Duval, Tabti (Dali, 63'), Guenaoui (Serraoui, 46'), Zamoum (Askar, 74'), Douib.

14 February 2023 Round of 32	ES Sétif	0–1 (a.e.t.)	JS Saoura	Sétif
16:30		Report	Lahmeri 106'	Stadium: 8 May 1945 Stadium; Referee: Lyes Bekouassa
Note: Lineup for ES Sétif - Bouhalfaya, Chaabi, Salem, Bouchama, Brahimi, Fellahi (Ouassini, 73'), Djabou, Tabti, Guenaoui (Masaoud Salem, 108'), Zamoum (Ghanem, 90+1'), Aouissi.

== Squad information ==
=== Playing statistics ===
No.	Pos	Player	Nat	Ligue 1			Algerian Cup			Total		
No.	Pos	Player	Nat	App	St	G	App	St	G	App	St	G
Goalkeepers
1	GK	Mohamed Lotfi Anis Osmani	(Algeria)	4	4	−4	0	0	0	4	4	−4
16	GK	Zakaria Bouhalfaya	(Algeria)	20	20	−22	2	2	−1	22	22	−23
23	GK	Mokhtar Ferrahi	(Algeria)	6	6	−6	0	0	0	6	6	−6
Defenders
2	CB	Drice Chaabi	(Algeria)	27	27	1	2	2	0	29	29	1
3	LB	Tarek Belouchat	(Algeria)	1	0	0	0	0	0	1	0	0
4	CB	Ibrahim Hachoud	(Algeria)	22	22	0	0	0	0	22	22	0
5	RB	Mohamed Khoutir Ziti	(Algeria)	20	17	0	0	0	0	20	17	0
12	CB	Hamza Salem	(Algeria)	22	18	1	2	2	0	24	20	1
13	CB	Islem Chebbour	(Algeria)	1	0	0	0	0	0	1	0	0
22	LB	Belkacem Brahimi	(Algeria)	24	16	0	2	2	2	26	18	2
~~21~~	DF	Kousseila Temericht (Note: Player transferred out during the season)	(Algeria)	2	2	0	1	0	0	3	2	0
25	LB	Kheireddine Benamrane	(Algeria)	11	5	0	1	1	0	12	6	0
Midfielders
6	CM	Saïd Arab	(Algeria)	0	0	0	0	0	0	0	0	0
8	AM	Larbi Tabti	(Algeria)	20	16	1	2	2	0	22	18	1
10	RW	Abdelmoumene Djabou	(Algeria)	13	9	0	1	1	0	14	10	0
14	DM	Nassim Yattou	(Algeria)	26	25	1	1	1	1	27	26	2
15	MF	Sami Guediri	(Algeria)	12	12	0	0	0	0	12	12	0
17	MF	Houssem Eddine Ouassini	(Algeria)	6	0	0	1	0	0	7	0	0
18	CM	Bassam Chaouti	(Algeria)	14	7	0	0	0	0	14	7	0
19	MF	Youcef Dali	(Algeria)	8	2	0	1	0	0	9	2	0
20	MF	Youcef Serraoui	(Algeria)	10	5	0	1	0	0	11	5	0
21	MF	Fouad Ghanem	(Algeria)	5	1	0	1	0	0	6	1	0
32	MF	Bassem Mechaar	(Algeria)	1	0	0	0	0	0	1	0	0
43	AM	Salah Bouchama	(Algeria)	21	14	0	1	1	0	22	15	0
68	MF	Rachid Boumessous	(Algeria)	2	1	0	0	0	0	2	1	0
~~6~~	CM	Ahmed Kendouci	(Algeria)	11	0	8	0	0	0	11	0	8
~~24~~	DM	Duval Wapiwo	(Cameroon)	4	4	0	1	1	0	5	5	0
Forwards
7	LW	Zerroug Boucif	(Algeria)	8	2	3	0	0	0	8	2	3
9	CF	Mohamed Aimen Akziz	(Algeria)	5	2	1	0	0	0	5	2	1
11	FW	Abdelhak Askar	(Algeria)	22	16	3	1	0	0	23	16	3
24	CF	Nkembe Enow	(Cameroon)	12	10	5	0	0	0	12	10	5
26	LW	Ghiles Guenaoui	(Algeria)	21	20	7	2	2	1	23	22	8
27	LW	Walid Zamoum	(Algeria)	22	18	3	2	2	0	24	20	3
42	CF	Youcef Fellahi	(Algeria)	12	2	0	1	1	0	13	3	0
61	FW	Mohamed Messaoud Salem	(Algeria)	4	0	0	2	0	0	6	0	0
88	FW	Youcef Aouissi	(Algeria)	12	5	1	1	1	0	13	6	1
90	FW	Rafik Douib	(Algeria)	3	0	0	1	1	2	4	0	2
~~17~~	CF	Godwin Chika	(Nigeria)	9	8	2	0	0	0	9	8	2
Total				30		38	2		6	32		44

=== Goalscorers ===
Includes all competitive matches. The list is sorted alphabetically by surname when total goals are equal.

No.	Nat.	Player	Pos.	L 1	AC	TOTAL
6	(Algeria)	Ahmed Kendouci	MF	8	0	8
26	(Algeria)	Ghiles Guenaoui	FW	7	1	8
24	(Cameroon)	Nkembe Enow	FW	5	0	5
27	(Algeria)	Walid Zamoum	FW	3	0	3
11	(Algeria)	Abdelhak Askar	FW	3	0	3
7	(Algeria)	Zerroug Boucif	FW	3	0	3
17	(Nigeria)	Godwin Chika	FW	2	0	2
90	(Algeria)	Rafik Douib	FW	0	2	2
22	(Algeria)	Belkacem Brahimi	DF	0	2	2
14	(Algeria)	Nassim Yattou	MF	1	1	2
9	(Algeria)	Mohamed Aimen Akziz	FW	1	0	1
8	(Algeria)	Larbi Tabti	MF	1	0	1
88	(Algeria)	Youcef Aouissi	FW	1	0	1
12	(Algeria)	Hamza Salem	DF	1	0	1
2	(Algeria)	Drice Chaabi	DF	1	0	1
43	(Algeria)	Salah Bouchama	MF	1	0	1
Own Goals				0	0	0
Totals				38	6	44
