= Gaëtan Laura =

French footballer (born 1995)

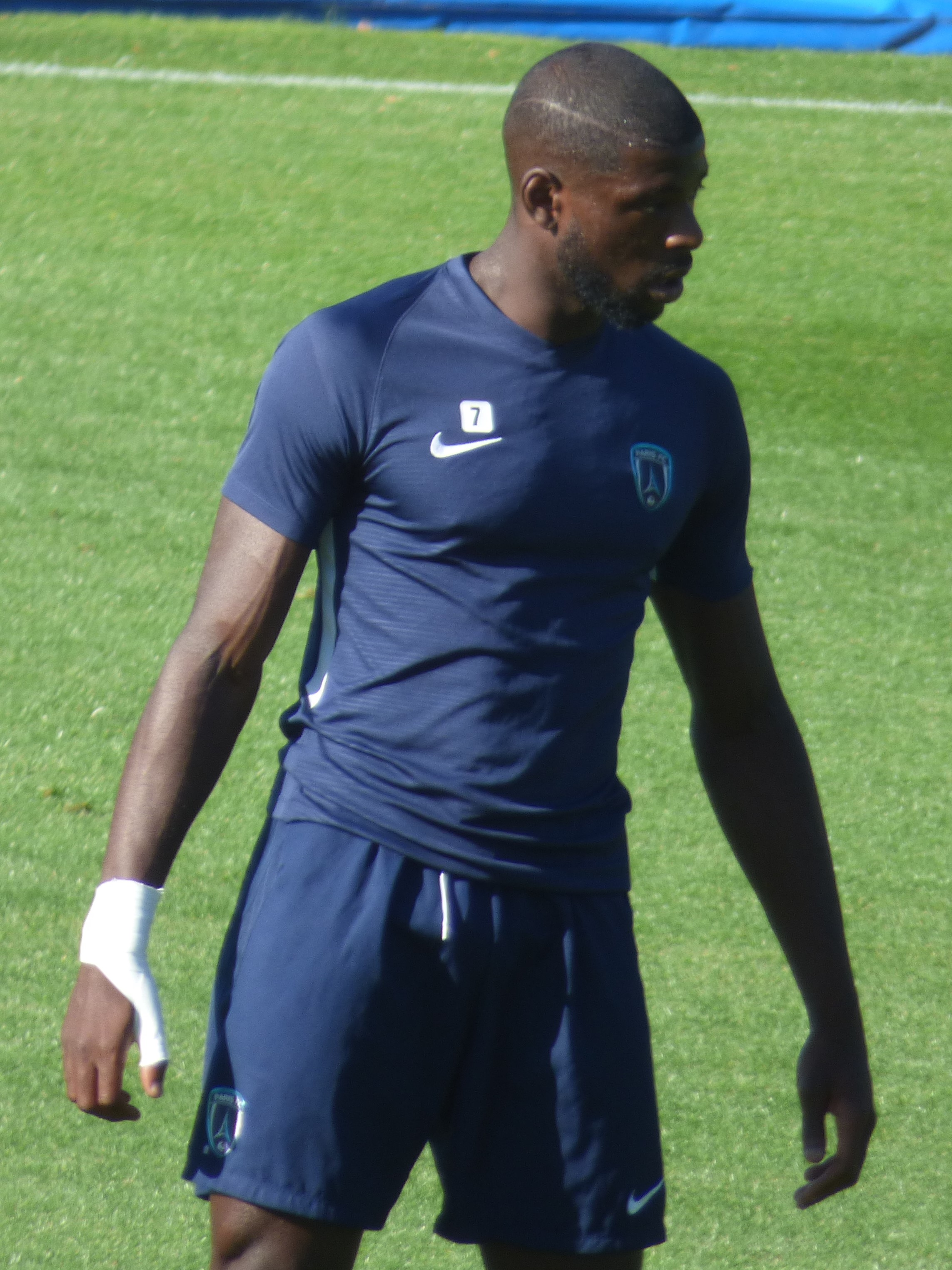

Personal information
- Full name: Gaëtan Loamba Laura
- Date of birth: 6 August 1995 (age 31)
- Place of birth: Argentan, France
- Height: 1.82 m (6 ft 0 in)
- Position: Forward

Team information
- Current team: Newroz
- Number: 21

Youth career
- UF Argentan
- US Alençon

Senior career*
Years	Team	Apps	(Gls)
2012–2013	US Alençon		
2013–2015	Lorient B	30	(5)
2015–2016	Saint-Lô Manche	17	(3)
2016–2018	Évreux	37	(22)
2018–2019	Lens B	28	(6)
2019–2020	Quevilly-Rouen	23	(11)
2020–2022	Paris FC	50	(12)
2022	→ Cosenza (loan)	15	(1)
2022–2025	Samsunspor	46	(11)
2024	→ Gençlerbirliği (loan)	5	(0)
2025	Ankaragücü	10	(0)
2025–	Newroz	6	(2)
- * Club domestic league appearances and goals as of 29 October 2025

Gaëtan Loamba Laura (born 6 August 1995) is a professional footballer who plays as a forward for Iraqi club Newroz. Born in France, he has opted to represent the DR Congo internationally.

== Club career ==
A prolific footballer in the amateur divisions of French football, Laura joined Paris FC in the French Ligue 2 in the summer of 2020. He made his professional debut with Paris FC in a 3–0 league win over FC Chambly on 22 August 2020, scoring a goal.

On 31 January 2022, he joined Italian club Cosenza on loan with an option to buy.

On 20 June 2022, Laura signed a three-year contract (with an option for a fourth year) with Samsunspor in Turkey.

== International career ==
Born in France, Laura is of DR Congolese descent. In March 2023, he was called up to the DR Congo national team for a set of matches.

== Career statistics ==
=== Club ===
As of 11 September 2021

Appearances and goals by club, season and competition
Club	Season	League			National Cup		League Cup		Continental		Other		Total	
Club	Season	Division	Apps	Goals	Apps	Goals	Apps	Goals	Apps	Goals	Apps	Goals	Apps	Goals
Lorient II	2013–14	National 3	17	4	—		—		—		—		17	4
Lorient II	2014–15	National 2	13	1	—		—		—		—		13	1
Lorient II	Total		30	5	0	0	0	0	0	0	0	0	30	5
FC Saint-Lô Manche	2015–16	National 3	17	3	0	0	0	0	—		—		17	3
Évreux	2016–17	National 3	13	1	0	0	0	0	—		—		13	1
Évreux	2017–18	National 3	24	21	2	1	0	0	—		—		26	22
Évreux	Total		37	22	2	1	0	0	0	0	0	0	39	23
Lens II	2018–19	National 2	28	6	—		—		—		—		28	6
US Quevilly-Rouen	2019–20	National	23	11	2	0	1	0	—		—		26	11
Paris FC	2020–21	Ligue 2	33	8	0	0	0	0	—		—		33	8
Paris FC	2021–22	Ligue 2	15	4	0	0	2	3	—		—		17	7
Paris FC	Total		48	12	2	0	2	3	0	0	0	0	48	15
Career total			173	58	4	1	1	0	0	0	0	0	178	59
