= Moustapha Name =

Senegalese footballer (born 1995)

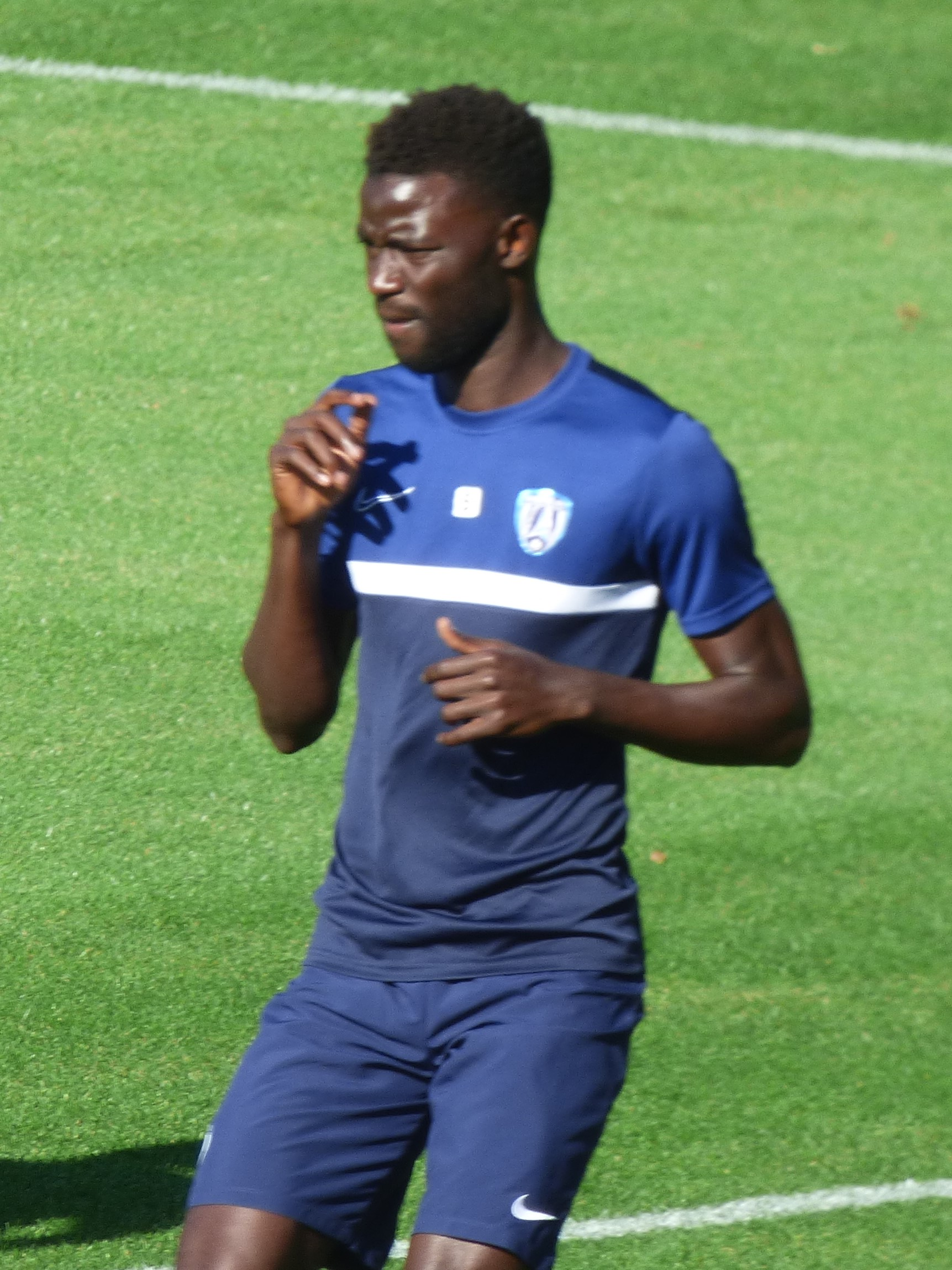
- Name in 2020

Personal information
- Full name: Moustapha Name
- Date of birth: 5 May 1995 (age 31)
- Place of birth: Dakar, Senegal
- Height: 1.85 m (6 ft 1 in)
- Position: Midfielder

Team information
- Current team: United
- Number: 25

Youth career
- 2010–2014: Dakar Sacré-Cœur
- 2014–2015: Avenir Dakar
- 2015: Lokeren

Senior career*
Years	Team	Apps	(Gls)
2016–2018	Douanes		
2018–2020	Pau	56	(8)
2020–2022	Paris	67	(11)
2022–2025	Pafos	69	(6)
2025	→ CFR Cluj (loan)	3	(0)
2025–	United	0	(0)

International career^{‡}
2020–2022	Senegal	6	(0)
Medal record
Men's football
Representing Senegal
Africa Cup of Nations
Winner	2021 Cameroon
- * Club domestic league appearances and goals as of 28 February 2025 ‡ National team caps and goals as of 10 December 2022

Moustapha Name (born 5 May 1995) is a Senegalese professional footballer who plays as a midfielder for UAE First Division League club United.

== Club career ==
=== Douanes ===
Moustapha Name started his career at Douanes in his native Senegal in 2016. During the 2017–18 season, he scored ten goals in the Senegal Premier League.

=== Pau ===
In 2018, Name joined Pau and adapted quickly to French football in the Béarnese capital. In his second season, he occasionally captained the team.

In the 2019–20 Coupe de France, Pau reached the round of 16 and lost to a Paris Saint-Germain (PSG) side that went on to win the entire competition. The 2019–20 season was very successful for both Name and Pau; Pau achieved promoted to Ligue 2, and Name's displays against Ligue 1 heavyweights Bordeaux and PSG in the Coupe de France helped him make a name for himself.

=== Paris ===
On 27 June 2020, Name signed with Paris after successful seasons with Pau in the Championnat National. He made his professional debut with Paris FC in a 3–0 Ligue 2 win over Chambly on 22 August 2020.

=== Pafos ===
On 31 August 2022, Pafos announced the signing of Name. On 4 February 2025, Name joined CFR Cluj on loan for the remainder of the season.

=== United ===
On 24 September 2025, UAE First Division League club United announced the signing of Name.

== International career ==
Name debuted with the Senegal national team in a 2–0 2021 Africa Cup of Nations qualification win over Guinea Bissau on 11 November 2020.

He was part of Senegal's squad for the 2021 Africa Cup of Nations; the Lions of Teranga went on to win the tournament for the first time in their history.

Name was appointed a Grand Officer of the National Order of the Lion by President of Senegal Macky Sall following the nation's victory at the tournament.

== Career statistics ==
=== Club ===
As of match played 28 February 2025

Appearances and goals by club, season and competition
Club	Season	League			National Cup		Continental		Other		Total	
Club	Season	Division	Apps	Goals	Apps	Goals	Apps	Goals	Apps	Goals	Apps	Goals
Pau	2018–19	National	33	4	4	1	—		—		37	5
Pau	2019–20	National	23	4	5	1	—		—		28	5
Pau	Total		56	8	9	2	—		—		65	10
Paris FC	2020–21	Ligue 2	31	4	1	1	—		1 (Note: Appearance in Ligue 2 promotion play-offs)	0	33	5
Paris FC	2021–22	Ligue 2	31	7	1	3	—		1	0	33	10
Paris FC	2022–23	Ligue 2	5	0	—		—		—		5	0
Paris FC	Total		67	11	2	4	—		2	0	71	15
Pafos	2022–23	Cypriot First Division	22	4	5	1	—		—		27	5
Pafos	2023–24	Cypriot First Division	34	2	5	0	—		—		39	2
Pafos	2024–25	Cypriot First Division	13	0	1	0	12 (Note: Two appearances in UEFA Europa League, ten appearances and one goal in UEFA Conference League)	1	1 (Note: Appearance in Cypriot Super Cup)	0	27	1
Pafos	Total		69	6	11	1	12	1	1	0	93	8
CFR Cluj (loan)	2024–25	Liga I	3	0	0	0	—		—		3	0
Career total			195	25	22	7	12	1	3	0	232	33

=== International ===
As of match played 24 September 2022

Appearances and goals by national team and year
National team	Year	Apps	Goals
Senegal	2020	1	0
Senegal	2021	4	0
Senegal	2022	1	0
Total		6	0

== Honours ==
Pafos

- Cypriot Cup: 2023–24
- Cypriot Super Cup runner-up: 2024

CFR Cluj

- Cupa României: 2024–25

Senegal

- Africa Cup of Nations: 2021

Orders

- Grand Officer of the National Order of the Lion: 2022
