= Lamine Diaby-Fadiga =

Guinean footballer (born 2001)

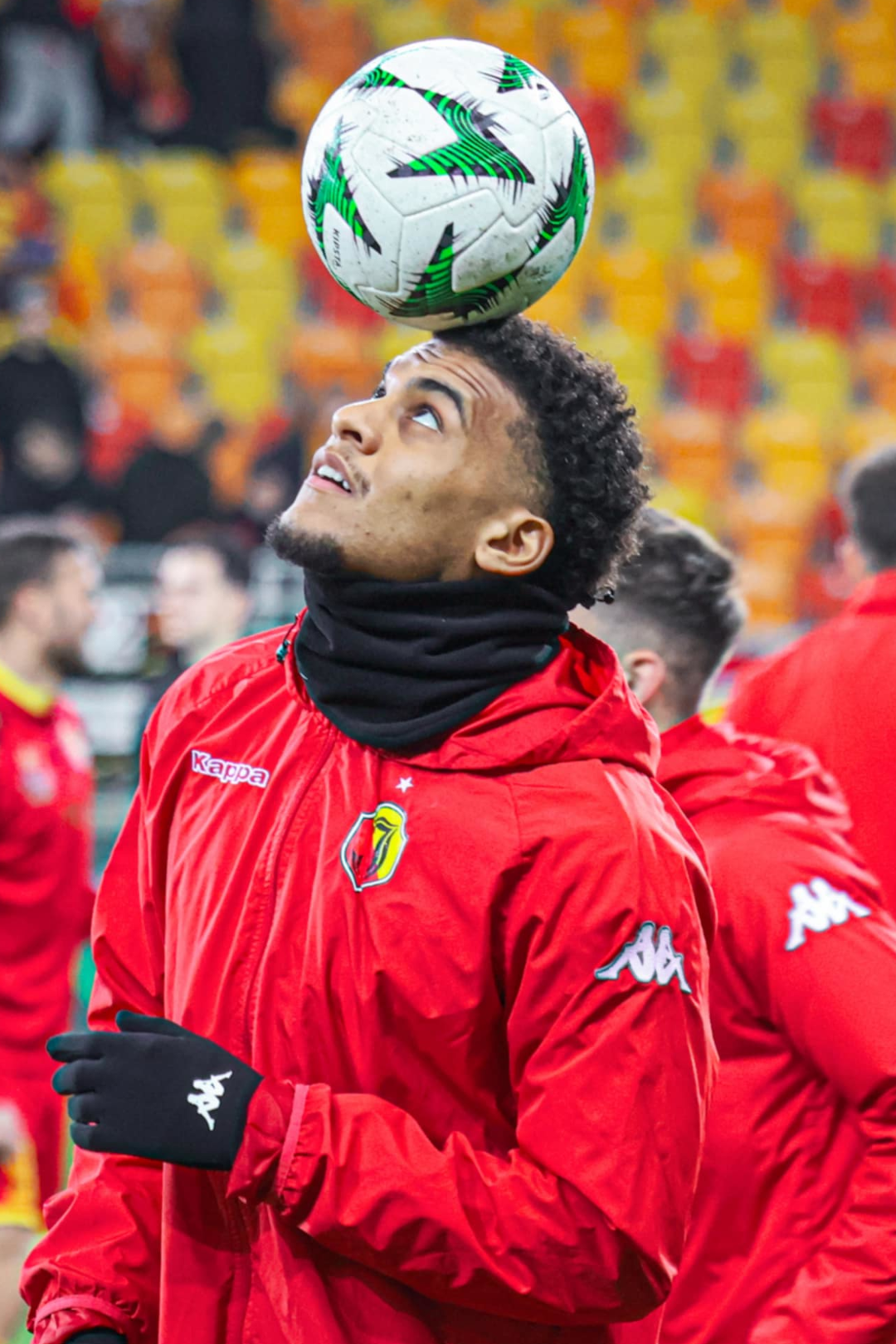
- Diaby-Fadiga with Jagiellonia in 2025

Personal information
- Full name: Mohamed Lamine Diaby-Fadiga
- Date of birth: 19 January 2001 (age 25)
- Place of birth: Grasse, France
- Height: 1.88 m (6 ft 2 in)
- Position: Forward

Team information
- Current team: Raków Częstochowa
- Number: 80

Youth career
- 2007–2008: Stade de Vallauris
- 2008–2009: Cannet Rocheville
- 2009–2010: Stade de Vallauris
- 2010–2012: Cannet Rocheville
- 2012–2013: Cannes
- 2013–2014: Mougins Côte d'Azur
- 2014–2017: Nice

Senior career*
Years	Team	Apps	(Gls)
2017–2019	Nice B	15	(3)
2017–2019	Nice	6	(0)
2019–2024	Paris	43	(4)
2021–2023	Paris B	6	(2)
2022–2023	→ Eindhoven (loan)	24	(2)
2024–2025	Jagiellonia Białystok	27	(3)
2025–	Raków Częstochowa	37	(11)

International career^{‡}
2017	France U16	6	(5)
2017–2018	France U17	10	(8)
2018	France U18	3	(0)
2026–	Guinea	2	(0)
- * Club domestic league appearances and goals as of 14:57, 9 November 2026 (UTC) ‡ National team caps and goals as of 21:16, 1 October 2026 (UTC)

Mohamed Lamine Diaby-Fadiga (born 19 January 2001) is a professional footballer who plays as forward for Polish club Raków Częstochowa. Born in France, he plays for the Guinea national team.

== Club career ==
=== Nice ===
Diaby-Fadiga made his first team debut for Nice on 7 December 2017, in a 1–0 away loss against Vitesse in Europa League entering the field after 66 minutes to replace Alassane Pléa. In doing so, Diaby Fadiga became the first player born in the 21st century to appear for Nice. He made his league debut the following season on 11 August 2018 against Reims, replacing Bassem Srarfi in the 61st minute of a 1–0 home loss.

On 16 September 2019, Diaby-Fadiga stole a luxury watch at an estimated value of €70,000 from teammate Kasper Dolberg. He confessed to the crime seven days later, and was sacked by Nice as a result.

=== Paris FC ===
On 2 October 2019, Diaby-Fadiga signed for Ligue 2 side Paris FC. On 8 July 2022, he was loaned to FC Eindhoven in the Netherlands.

=== Jagiellonia Białystok ===
On 19 June 2024, he signed for Polish champions Jagiellonia Białystok on a free transfer, on a two-year deal with a one-year extension option, effective from 1 July. A month later, on 19 July 2024, he scored a goal on his debut in 2–0 win over Puszcza Niepołomice, after coming onto the pitch in the 81st minute, replacing Afimico Pululu. He ended the 2024–25 season with three goals and one assist in 42 appearances across all competitions.

=== Raków Częstochowa ===
On 18 June 2025, Diaby-Fadiga moved to fellow Ekstraklasa club Raków Częstochowa for an undisclosed fee. He signed a three-year contract with a two-year extension option.

== International career ==
Diaby-Fadiga was born in France and is of Guinean and Algerian descent. He was a youth international for France.

On 26 September 2025, he received his maiden call-up to the Guinea national team for 2026 FIFA World Cup qualifiers against Mozambique and Botswana. On 6 October, he withdrew from the squad.

On 6 March 2026, Diaby-Fadiga's request to switch his international allegiance to Guinea was approved by FIFA. On 26 September, he debuted for Guinea in a 2–1 loss to South Africa in a 2027 AFCON qualification match.

== Career statistics ==
=== Club ===
As of match played 8 November 2026

Appearances and goals by club, season and competition
Club	Season	League			National cup (Note: Includes Coupe de France, KNVB Cup, Polish Cup)		Europe		Other		Total	
Club	Season	Division	Apps	Goals	Apps	Goals	Apps	Goals	Apps	Goals	Apps	Goals
Nice B	2017–18	National 2	4	1	—		—		—		4	1
Nice B	2018–19	National 2	10	2	—		—		—		10	2
Nice B	2019–20	National 2	1	0	—		—		—		1	0
Nice B	Total		15	3	—		—		—		15	3
Nice	2017–18	Ligue 1	0	0	0	0	1 (Note: Appearance in UEFA Europa League)	0	—		1	0
Nice	2018–19	Ligue 1	6	0	0	0	0	0	—		6	0
Nice	Total		6	0	0	0	1	0	—		7	0
Paris FC	2019–20	Ligue 2	11	0	2	2	—		0	0	13	2
Paris FC	2020–21	Ligue 2	6	0	0	0	—		1 (Note: Appearance in Ligue 2 promotion play-offs)	0	7	0
Paris FC	2021–22	Ligue 2	2	0	2	3	—		0	0	4	3
Paris FC	2023–24	Ligue 2	24	4	3	3	—		0	0	27	7
Paris FC	Total		43	4	7	8	—		1	0	51	12
Paris FC B	2021–22	National 3	6	2	—		—		—		6	2
FC Eindhoven (loan)	2022–23	Eerste Divisie	24	2	1	0	—		2 (Note: Appearances in Eredivisie promotion/relegation play-offs)	0	27	2
Jagiellonia Białystok	2024–25	Ekstraklasa	27	3	1	0	13 (Note: Three appearances in UEFA Champions League, two appearances in UEFA Europa League, eight appearances in UEFA Conference League)	0	1 (Note: Appearance in Polish Super Cup)	0	42	3
Raków Częstochowa	2025–26	Ekstraklasa	28	7	4	2	13 (Note: Appearances in UEFA Conference League)	6	—		45	15
Raków Częstochowa	2026–27	Ekstraklasa	9	4	1	1	3	2	—		13	7
Raków Częstochowa	Total		37	11	5	3	16	8	—		58	22
Career total			158	25	14	11	30	8	4	0	206	44

=== International ===
As of match played 1 October 2026

Appearances and goals by national team and year
National team	Year	Apps	Goals
Guinea
Guinea	2026	2	0
Total		2	0

== Honours ==
Jagiellonia Białystok

- Polish Super Cup: 2024
