= Thibault Campanini =

French footballer (born 1998)

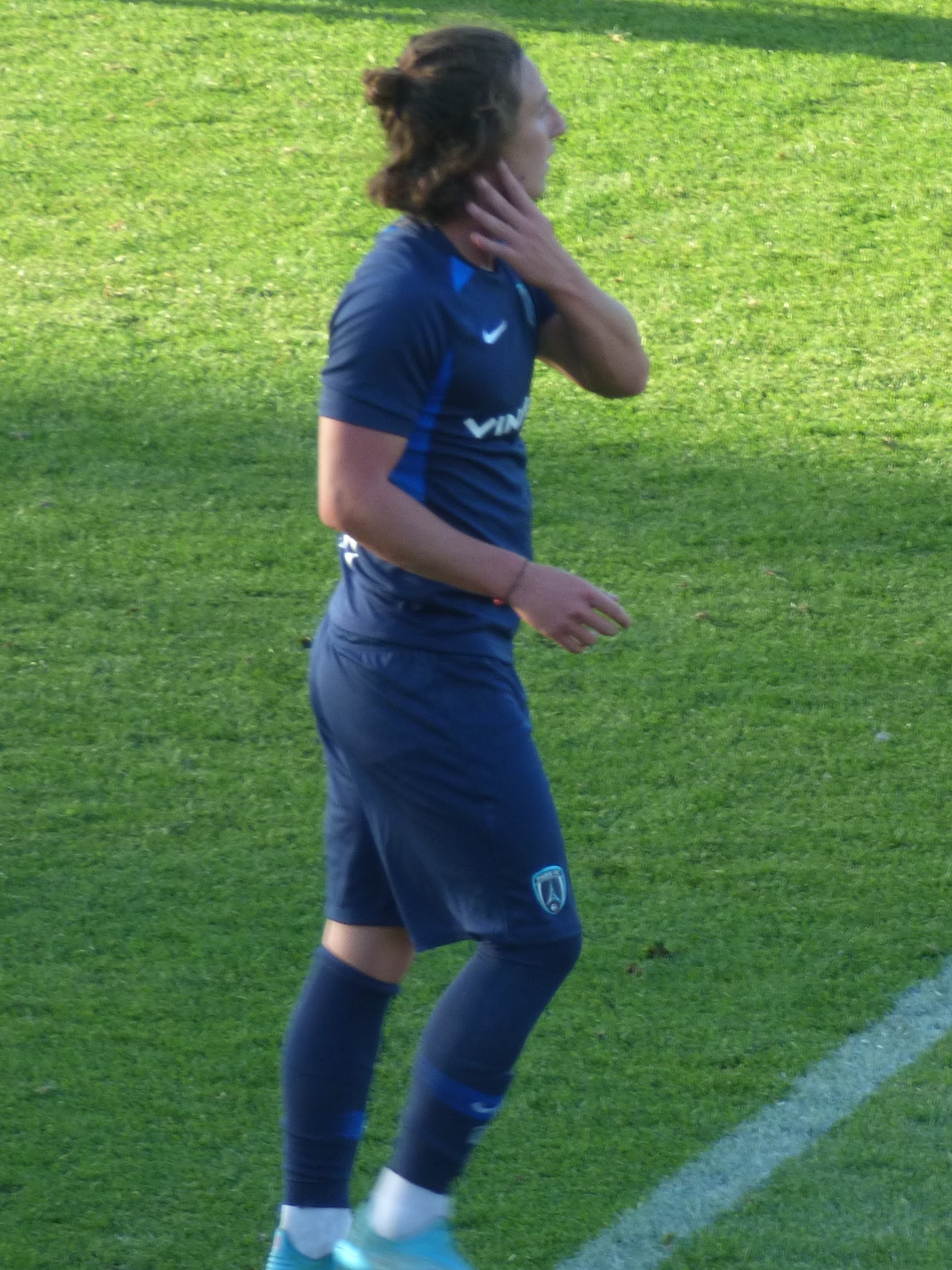
- Campanini with Paris FC in 2020

Personal information
- Date of birth: 27 July 1998 (age 28)
- Place of birth: Marseille, France
- Height: 1.77 m (5 ft 10 in)
- Position: Right-back

Team information
- Current team: Ajaccio

Youth career
- 2004–2007: Marseille
- 2007–2010: AS Mazargues
- 2010: SC D'Air Bel
- 2010–2015: Ajaccio
- 2016–2017: Gazélec Ajaccio

Senior career*
Years	Team	Apps	(Gls)
2017–2020	Gazélec Ajaccio	52	(0)
2020–2022	Paris FC II	8	(0)
2020–2022	Paris FC	9	(0)
2022–2025	Ajaccio II	19	(0)
2023–	Ajaccio	6+ (Note: Statistics unknown for the 2025–26 season.)	(0+)

International career
2018	France U20	2	(0)
- * Club domestic league appearances and goals as of 12 May 2025

Thibault Campanini (born 27 July 1998) is a French professional footballer who plays as a right-back for Régional 1 club Ajaccio.

== Club career ==
Campanini was born in Marseille and signed for Gazélec Ajaccio from rivals AC Ajaccio in 2016. He made his debut on 10 March 2017, playing 80 minutes in a 3–1 win over Troyes.

On 13 June 2020, Campanini joined Paris FC, signing a two-year contract.

On 5 July 2023, Campanini returned to his youth club, AC Ajaccio, signing a two-year contract with the club, after spending the 2022–23 season with the reserve team.

== Career statistics ==
=== Club ===
As of 17 March 2025

Appearances and goals by club, season and competition
Club	Season	League			Coupe de France		Coupe de la Ligue		Total	
Club	Season	Division	Apps	Goals	Apps	Goals	Apps	Goals	Apps	Goals
Gazélec Ajaccio	2016–17	Ligue 2	8	0	0	0	0	0	8	0
Gazélec Ajaccio	2017–18	Ligue 2	10	0	2	0	2	0	14	0
Gazélec Ajaccio	2018–19	Ligue 2	17	0	3	0	1	0	21	0
Gazélec Ajaccio	2019–20	Championnat National	17	0	0	0	1	0	18	0
Gazélec Ajaccio	Total		52	0	5	0	4	0	61	0
Paris FC II	2020–21	Championnat National 3	1	0	—		—		1	0
Paris FC II	2021–22	Championnat National 3	7	0	—		—		7	0
Paris FC II	Total		8	0	0	0	0	0	8	0
Paris FC	2020–21	Ligue 2	1	0	0	0	0	0	1	0
Paris FC	2021–22	Ligue 2	8	0	1	0	0	0	9	0
Paris FC	Total		9	0	1	0	0	0	10	0
Ajaccio II	2022–23	Championnat National 3	9	0	—		—		9	0
Ajaccio II	2023–24	Championnat National 3	4	0	—		—		4	0
Ajaccio II	2024–25	Championnat National 3	4	0	—		—		4	0
Ajaccio II	Total		17	0	0	0	0	0	17	0
Ajaccio	2023–24	Ligue 2	6	0	2	0	0	0	8	0
Ajaccio	2024–25	Ligue 2	0	0	1	0	0	0	1	0
Ajaccio	2025–26	Régional 2 Corsica					—			
Ajaccio	Total		6	0	3	0	0	0	9	0
Career total			92	0	9	0	4	0	105	0

== Honours ==
Ajaccio

- Régional 2 Corsica: 2025–26
