= Axel Bamba =

Footballer (born 1999)

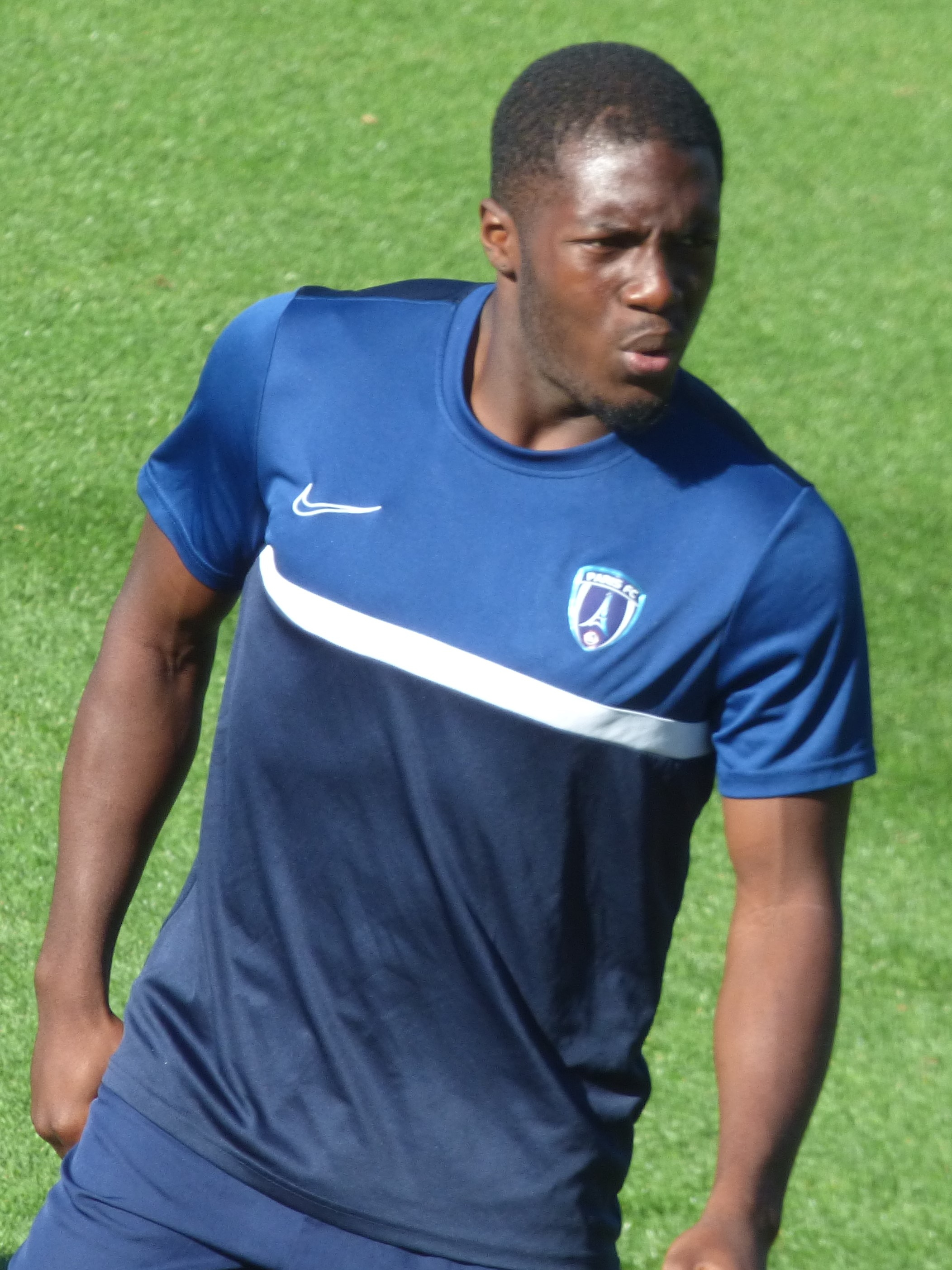
- Bamba with Paris FC in 2020

Personal information
- Date of birth: 6 July 1999 (age 27)
- Place of birth: Zürich, Switzerland
- Height: 1.85 m (6 ft 1 in)
- Position: Defender

Team information
- Current team: Pau
- Number: 88

Youth career
- 2007–2008: Paris ES 16e
- 2008–2009: ACBB
- 2009–2018: Paris

Senior career*
Years	Team	Apps	(Gls)
2016–2021	Paris FC II	45	(4)
2018–2022	Paris FC	79	(4)
2022–2024	Sporting Gijón	7	(0)
2024–2025	Ajaccio	30	(3)
2026–	Pau	0	(0)
- * Club domestic league appearances and goals as of 12 May 2025

Axel Bamba (born 6 July 1999) is a professional footballer who plays as a defender for French Ligue 2 club Pau. Born in Switzerland, he has declared his desire to represent Ivory Coast at international level.

== Club career ==
Bamba joined the youth academy of Paris FC in 2010, and worked his way up to the senior team. He made his professional debut with Paris FC in a 0–0 (4–3) Coupe de la Ligue penalty shootout win over Ajaccio on 14 August 2018.

On 30 August 2022, Bamba signed a three-year contract with Sporting de Gijón in the Spanish Segunda División.

On 13 August 2024, Bamba signed a two-year contract with Ligue 2 club Ajaccio.

== International career ==
Bamba was born in Switzerland, where his Ivorian father Yacouba Bamba was playing football for FC Zürich, and moved to France at the a young age. Despite interest from the French youth teams, Bamba declared he would represent the Ivory Coast national team like his father.

== Career statistics ==
=== Club ===
As of 26 January 2021

Appearances and goals by club, season and competition
Club	Season	League			National cup		League cup		Continental		Other		Total	
Club	Season	Division	Apps	Goals	Apps	Goals	Apps	Goals	Apps	Goals	Apps	Goals	Apps	Goals
Paris FC II	2016–17	National 3	12	1	—		—		—		—		12	1
Paris FC II	2017–18	National 3	18	1	—		—		—		—		18	1
Paris FC II	2018–19	National 3	14	2	—		—		—		—		14	2
Paris FC II	Total		44	4	0	0	0	0	0	0	0	0	44	4
Paris FC	2017–18	Ligue 2	0	0	1	0	0	0	—		—		1	0
Paris FC	2018–19	Ligue 2	5	0	1	0	1	0	—		—		7	0
Paris FC	2019–20	Ligue 2	21	3	4	0	3	0	—		—		28	3
Paris FC	2020–21	Ligue 2	15	0	0	0	0	0	—		—		15	0
Paris FC	Total		41	3	6	0	4	0	0	0	0	0	51	3
Career total			85	7	6	0	4	0	0	0	0	0	95	7
