= Patrick Koffi =

American soccer player (born 2001)

Personal information
- Date of birth: October 16, 2001 (age 25)
- Place of birth: Dallas, Texas, United States
- Height: 1.82 m (6 ft 0 in)
- Position: Forward

Team information
- Current team: Bordeaux

Youth career
- FC Dallas
- Paris FC

Senior career*
Years	Team	Apps	(Gls)
2019–2023	Paris FC II	24	(16)
2020–2023	Paris FC	3	(0)
2021–2022	→ Créteil (loan)	3	(0)
2021–2022	→ Créteil II (loan)	2	(0)
2023	→ US Lusitanos (loan)	23	(8)
2023–2025	Fleury	34	(15)
2025–2026	Versailles	14	(0)
2026–	Bordeaux	0	(0)
- * Club domestic league appearances and goals as of 23:48, 15 August 2026 (UTC)

Patrick Koffi (born October 16, 2001) is an American professional soccer player who plays as a forward for French club Bordeaux.

== Club career ==
Koffi made his professional debut with Paris FC in a 1–1 Ligue 2 tie with Troyes on March 6, 2020.

In July 2021, Koffi joined third-tier side Créteil on loan. On February 1, 2022, he was recalled from loan.

In July 2026, Koffi signed for Bordeaux.

== Personal life ==
Koffi was born in the United States and he is of Ivorian descent. He moved to France at the age of 15 when he joined the youth system of Paris FC.

== Career statistics ==
As of December 13, 2021

Appearances and goals by club, season and competition
Club	Season	League			National Cup		Other		Total	
Club	Season	Division	Apps	Goals	Apps	Goals	Apps	Goals	Apps	Goals
Paris FC II	2018–19	National 3	1	2	—		—		1	2
Paris FC II	2019–20	National 3	15	7	—		—		15	7
Paris FC II	2020–21	National 3	3	3	—		—		3	3
Paris FC II	Total		19	12	—		—		19	12
Paris FC	2019–20	Ligue 2	1	0	0	0	0	0	1	0
Paris FC	2020–21	Ligue 2	2	0	0	0	0	0	2	0
Paris FC	Total		3	0	0	0	0	0	3	0
Créteil (loan)	2021–22	National	3	0	0	0	0	0	3	0
Créteil II (loan)	2021–22	National 3	2	0	—		—		2	0
Career total			22	12	0	0	0	0	22	12
