= Gaëtan Belaud =

French footballer (born 1986)

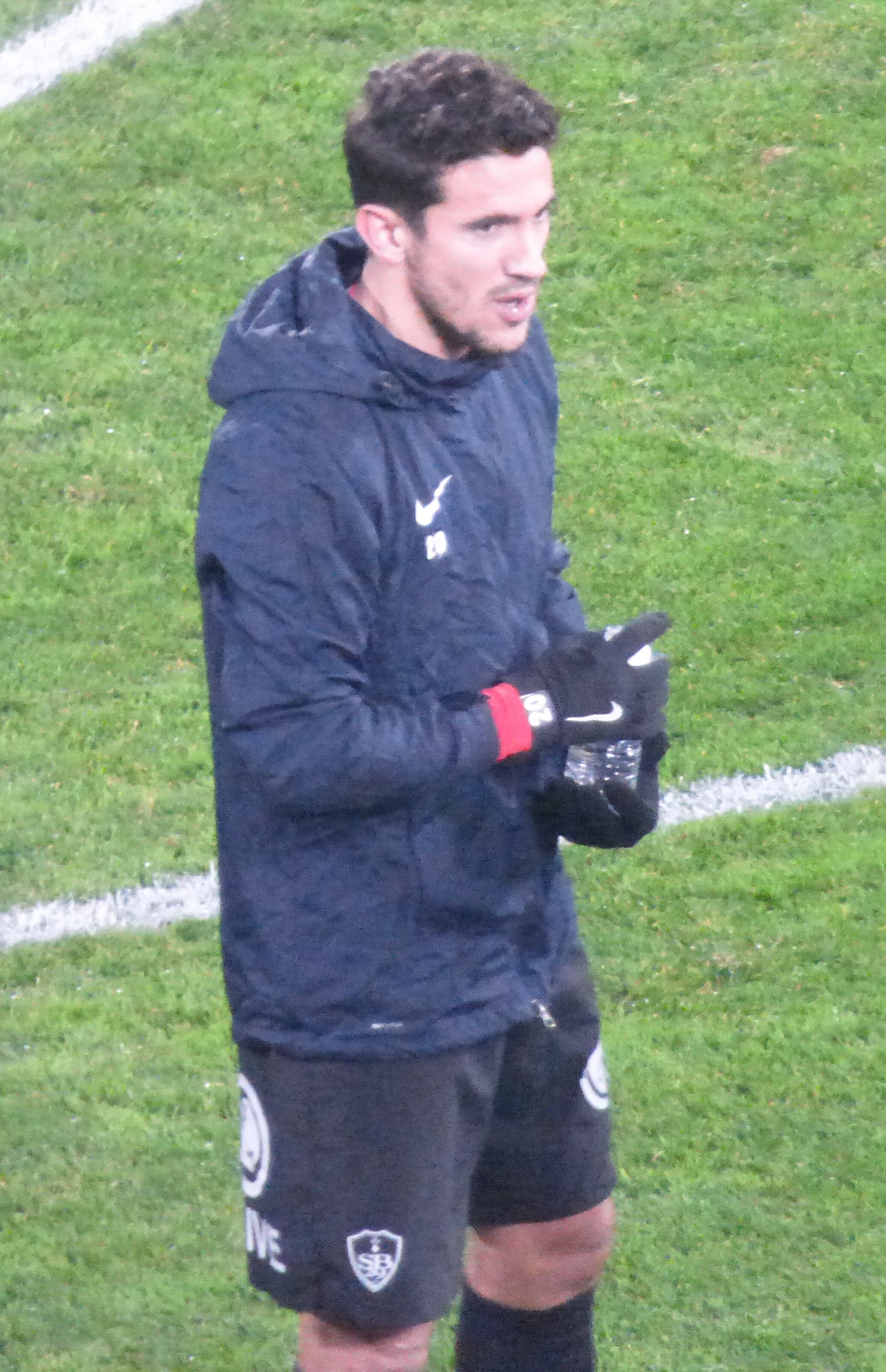
- Belaud with Brest in 2018

Personal information
- Full name: Gaëtan Belaud
- Date of birth: 16 September 1986 (age 40)
- Place of birth: Oloron-Sainte-Marie, France
- Height: 1.78 m (5 ft 10 in)
- Position: Right-back

Youth career
- FC Oloron

Senior career*
Years	Team	Apps	(Gls)
2004–2005	Guingamp B		
2005–2006	Lamballe FC		
2006–2008	Laval	59	(9)
2008–2010	Tours	16	(3)
2008–2009	→ Rodez (loan)	29	(5)
2010–2014	Laval	113	(0)
2014–2020	Brest	148	(2)
2020–2021	Paris FC	25	(0)
2021	FC Oloron		
- * Club domestic league appearances and goals as of 25 June 2020

Gaëtan Belaud (born 16 September 1986) is a French former professional footballer who played as a right-back.
