= Saïd Arab =

French footballer (born 2000)

Personal information
- Date of birth: 23 July 2000 (age 26)
- Place of birth: Paris, France
- Height: 1.78 m (5 ft 10 in)
- Position: Midfielder

Team information
- Current team: Union Titus Pétange
- Number: 21

Youth career
- –2013: Racing Club de France
- 2013–2014: Boulogne-Billancourt
- 2014: ASM Oran
- 2014–2015: USA Clichy
- 2015–2016: Paris Saint-Germain
- 2016–2018: Metz

Senior career*
Years	Team	Apps	(Gls)
2018–2020	Red Star	14	(1)
2020–2022	Paris FC	30	(3)
2021–2022	Paris FC II	1	(0)
2022	→ Bastia-Borgo (loan)	1	(0)
2023	ES Sétif	0	(0)
2023–2024	FC 93	7	(0)
2024–2025	GOAL FC	16	(1)
2025–	Union Titus Pétange	19	(2)
- * Club domestic league appearances and goals as of 13 June 2026

Saïd Arab (born 23 July 2000) is a French professional footballer who plays as a midfielder for Luxembourg National Division club Union Titus Pétange.

== Career ==
Arab began playing football locally with Racing Club de France, before joining the youth academy of Boulogne-Billancourt, and then training with ASM Oran in Algeria. He returned to France to the youth academy of USA Clichy, before training at Paris Saint-Germain and Metz. He signed his first senior contract with Red Star in 2018. Arab made his professional debut with Red Star in a 1–0 Ligue 2 loss to Niort on 17 May 2019. On 13 June 2020, he transferred to Paris FC, signing a contract for 3 years.

On 31 January 2022, Arab joined Bastia-Borgo on loan.

== Personal life ==
Born in France, Arab holds French and Algerian nationalities.

== Career statistics ==
As of match played 11 February 2022

Appearances and goals by club, season and competition
Club	Season	League			National Cup		Other		Total	
Club	Season	Division	Apps	Goals	Apps	Goals	Apps	Goals	Apps	Goals
Red Star	2018–19	Ligue 2	1	0	—		—		1	0
Red Star	2019–20	National	13	1	2	1	1 (Note: Appearance in the Coupe de la Ligue)	0	16	2
Red Star	Total		14	1	2	1	1	0	17	2
Paris FC	2020–21	Ligue 2	28	3	2	0	—		30	3
Paris FC	2021–22	Ligue 2	2	0	0	0	0	0	2	0
Paris FC	Total		30	3	2	0	—		32	3
Paris FC II	2021–22	National 3	1	0	—		—		1	0
Bastia-Borgo (loan)	2021–22	National	1	0	0	0	—		1	0
Career total			46	4	4	1	1	0	51	5
