= Mahamé Siby =

French footballer (born 1996)

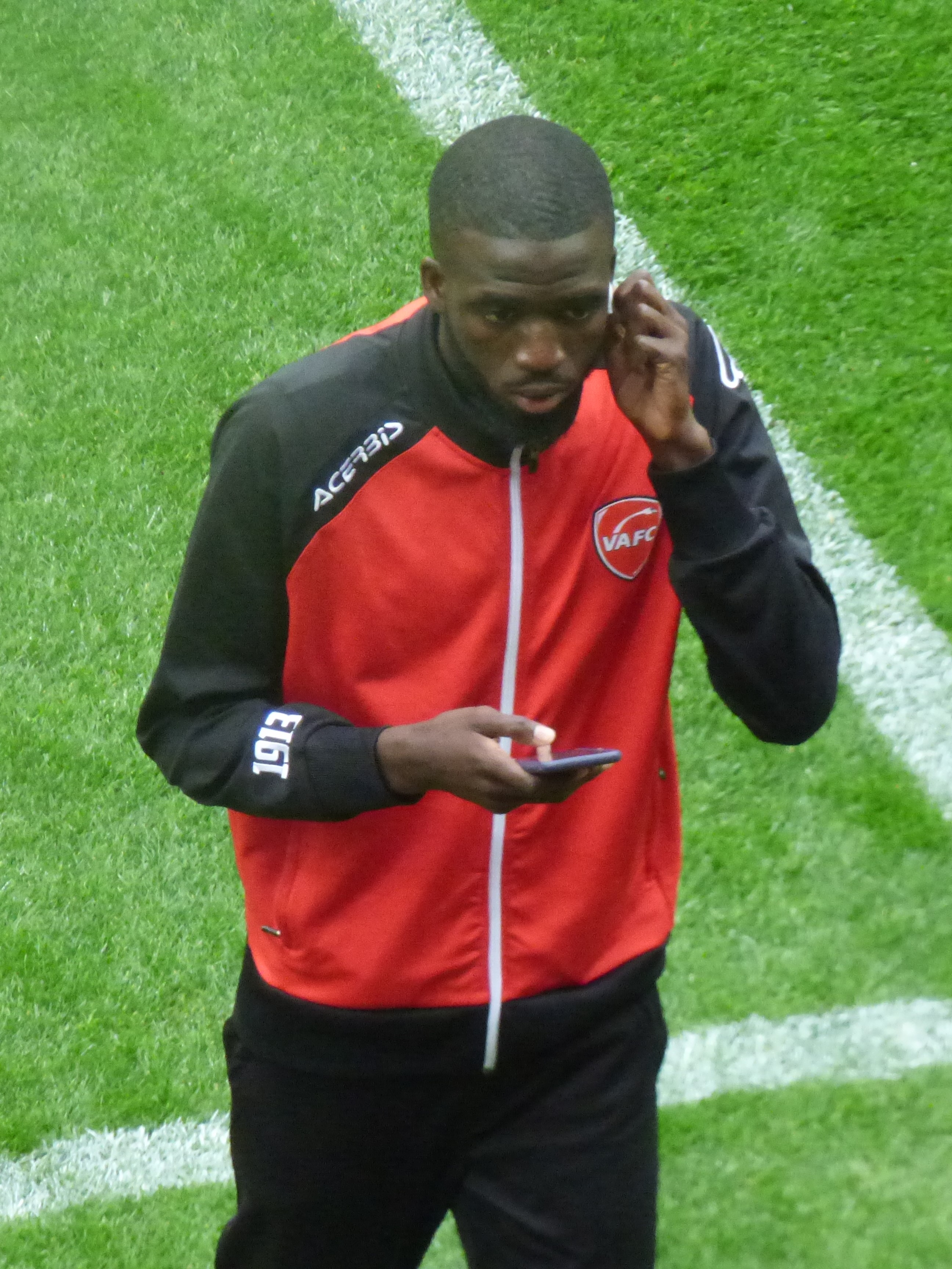
- Siby in 2018

Personal information
- Date of birth: 7 July 1996 (age 30)
- Place of birth: Paris, France
- Height: 1.91 m (6 ft 3 in)
- Position: Defensive midfielder

Team information
- Current team: Hougang United

Youth career
- 2010–2017: Bobigny

Senior career*
Years	Team	Apps	(Gls)
2017–2018	Bobigny	25	(0)
2018–2020	Valenciennes	5	(0)
2019–2020	Valenciennes B	7	(0)
2020–2022	Strasbourg B	1	(0)
2020–2022	Strasbourg	9	(0)
2021–2022	→ Paris FC (loan)	27	(2)
2022–2025	Malmö FF	3	(0)
2024	→ Bastia (loan)	15	(0)
2024–2025	→ Martigues (loan)	31	(2)
2026	Selangor	3	(0)
2026–	Hougang United	0	(0)
- * Club domestic league appearances and goals as of 20 September 2026

Mahamé Siby (born 7 July 1996) is a French professional footballer who plays as a defensive-midfielder for Singapore Premier League club Hougang United.

== Club career ==
Siby is a youth product of Bobigny, and moved to Valenciennes on 28 May 2018. He made his professional debut with the club in a 1–0 Ligue 2 loss to Chamois Niortais on 4 December 2018.

In July 2020, Siby joined Ligue 1 club Strasbourg. He make his club debut coming on as a substitution in a 4–0 win over Nantes on 6 December 2020. On 4 October 2021, Siby was loaned out to Ligue 2 club Paris FC on a season-long loan. He scored his first professional career goal scoring the winner in a 1–0 win over Rodez on 7 November.

On 29 June 2022, Siby signed a contract with Malmö FF in Sweden until the end of 2026. Siby was part of the squad that won the 2023 league title with the club. However on 13 January 2024, Siby joined Ligue 2 club Bastia on loan until the end of the season with the option to make the move permanent. On 23 July 2024, Siby was than loaned out to another Ligue 2 club, Martigues on a season-long loan.

On 7 January 2026, Siby joined Malaysia Super League club Selangor on a free transfer for the remainder of the 2025–26 season. He make his debut for the club on 10 January in a 5–2 win over DPMM.

On 18 September 2026, Siby joined Singapore Premier League club Hougang United.

== Personal life ==
Siby was born in Paris, France and has French nationality. He is of Malian descent.

== Honours ==
Malmö FF

- Allsvenskan: 2023
