= Youssoupha N'Diaye (footballer) =

Senegalese footballer

Personal information
- Date of birth: 7 October 1997 (age 29)
- Place of birth: Thiaroye, Senegal
- Height: 1.90 m (6 ft 3 in)
- Position: Centre-back

Team information
- Current team: Stade Briochin
- Number: 2

Senior career*
| Years | Team | Apps | (Gls) |
| –2017 | FC Lyon | | |
| 2017–2020 | Lyon-Duchère | 65 | (3) |
| 2018 | Lyon-Duchère II | 3 | (0) |
| 2020–2023 | Paris FC | 16 | (0) |
| 2022–2023 | Paris FC II | 3 | (0) |
| 2023 | → Stade Briochin (loan) | 5 | (0) |
| 2023 | → Stade Briochin II (loan) | 1 | (0) |
| 2024–2025 | Chassieu Décines | 9 | (1) |
| 2025– | Stade Briochin | 17 | (2) |
- * Club domestic league appearances and goals as of 23 June 2026

Youssoupha N'Diaye (born 7 October 1997) is a Senegalese professional footballer who plays as a centre-back for French Championnat National 1 club Stade Briochin.

== Career ==
On 17 May 2020, N'Diaye transferred to Ligue 2 club Paris FC from Championnat National side Lyon-Duchère. He made his professional debut with Paris FC in a 3–0 league win over FC Chambly on 22 August 2020.

On 17 January 2023, N'Diaye was loaned to Stade Briochin in Championnat National.
