= Vincent Demarconnay =

French footballer (born 1983)

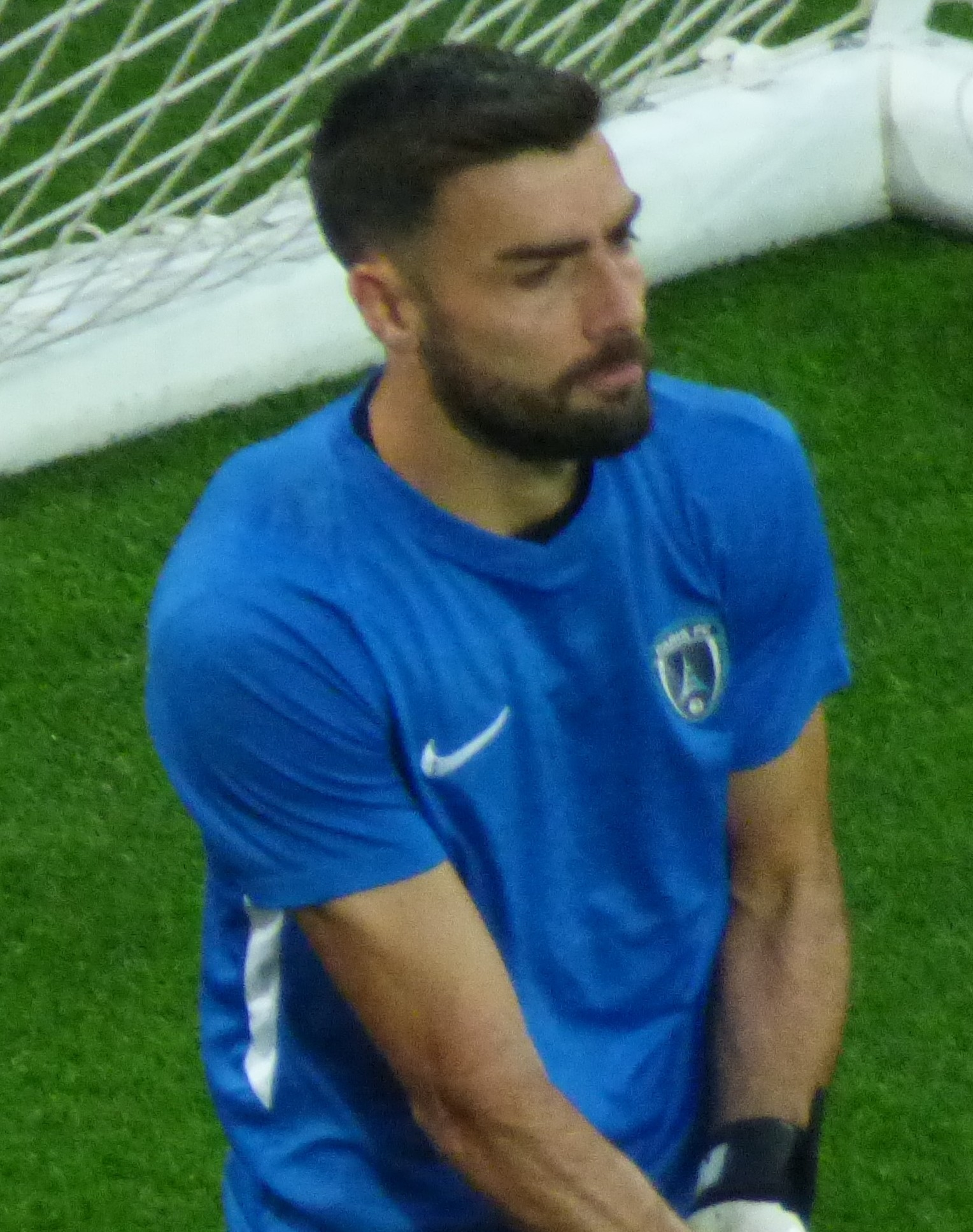
- Demarconnay with Paris FC in September 2018

Personal information
- Date of birth: 5 April 1983 (age 43)
- Place of birth: Poitiers, France
- Height: 1.80 m (5 ft 11 in)
- Position: Goalkeeper

Senior career*
Years	Team	Apps	(Gls)
2002–2005	Le Mans	2	(0)
2006–2007	Les Sables-d'Olonne	0	(0)
2007–2008	Romorantin	8	(0)
2008–2023	Paris FC	350	(0)
2013–2016	Paris FC II	6	(0)
Total		366	(0)
- * Club domestic league appearances and goals

Vincent Demarconnay (born 5 April 1983) is a French former professional footballer who played as a goalkeeper.
