= Mario-Jason Kikonda =

French footballer (born 1996)

Personal information
- Date of birth: 20 April 1996 (age 30)
- Place of birth: Le Mans, France
- Height: 1.75 m (5 ft 9 in)
- Position: Midfielder

Team information
- Current team: Saint-Colomban Locminé
- Number: 23

Senior career*
| Years | Team | Apps | (Gls) |
| 2015–2019 | Vannes | 72 | (7) |
| 2019 | Concarneau | 15 | (0) |
| 2019–2021 | Paris FC | 41 | (0) |
| 2021–2022 | Dunkerque | 28 | (0) |
| 2023 | Paris 13 Atletico | 13 | (2) |
| 2023–2024 | Botev Vratsa | 15 | (0) |
| 2024–2025 | Besa Kavajë | 1 | (0) |
| 2025 | Alashkert | 5 | (0) |
| 2025– | Saint-Colomban Locminé | 10 | (0) |
- * Club domestic league appearances and goals as of 4 December 2025

Mario-Jason Kikonda (born 20 April 1996) is a French professional footballer who plays as a midfielder for Saint-Colomban Locminé.

== Club career ==
On 28 August 2019, Kikonda signed his first professional contract with Paris FC. He made his professional debut with Paris FC in a 3–0 Ligue 2 loss to Chambly on 2 September 2019.

On 30 August 2021, he joined Dunkerque on a contract for one season with an option for a second.

On 1 February 2025, Armenian Premier League club Alashkert announced the singing of Kikonda. On 12 May 2025, after just 5 games for the club, Kikonda left Alashkert by mutual agreement.

== Personal life ==
Born in France, Kikonda is of Congolese (Kinshasa) descent.
