= Ousmane Kanté =

Association football player (born 1989)

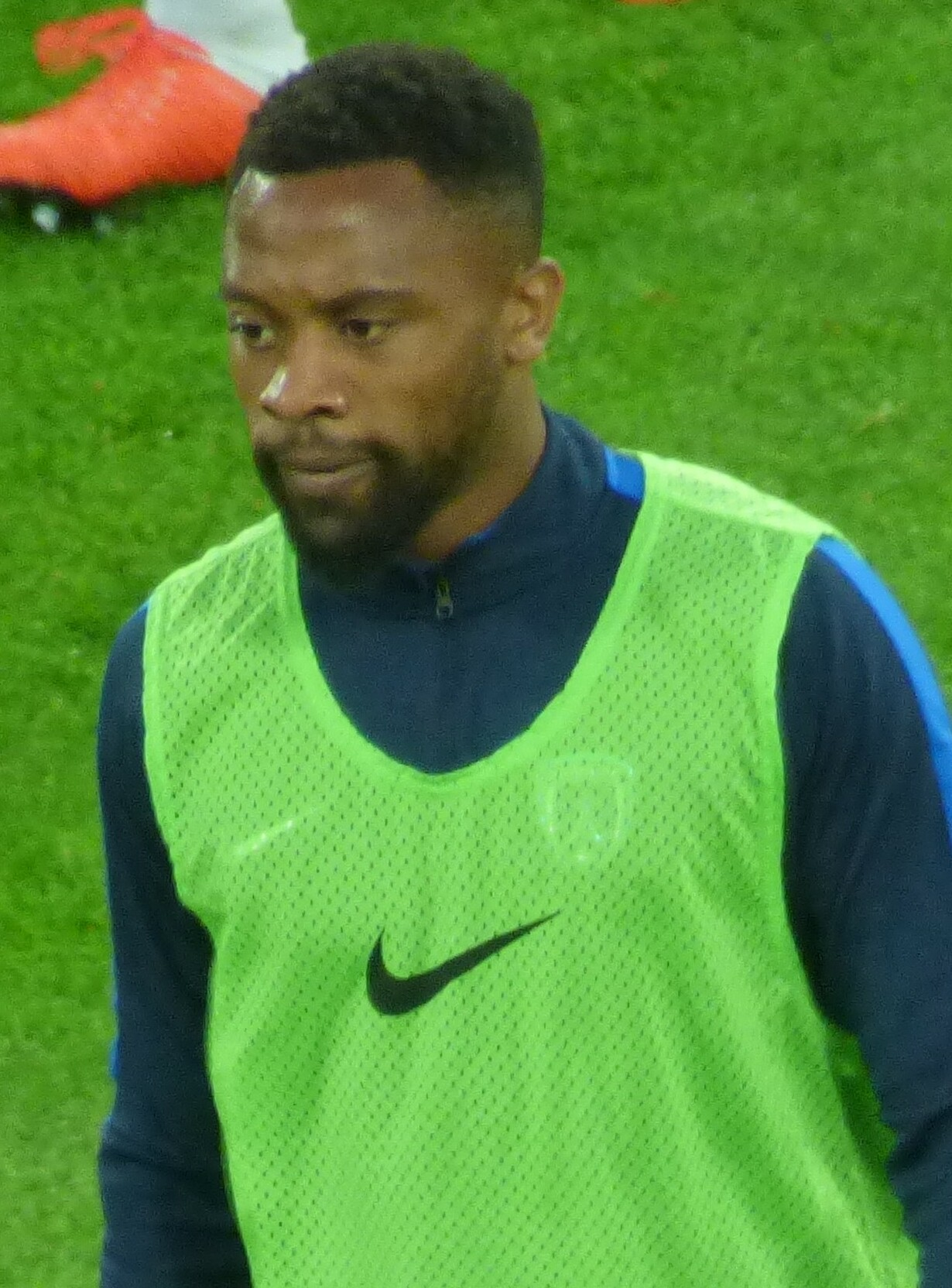
- Kanté with Paris FC in 2018

Personal information
- Date of birth: 21 September 1989 (age 37)
- Place of birth: Paris, France
- Height: 1.82 m (6 ft 0 in)
- Position: Defender

Youth career
- 1995–2014: Créteil

Senior career*
Years	Team	Apps	(Gls)
2014–2015	Créteil	26	(0)
2015–2016	Aubervilliers	10	(0)
2016–2017	Lusitanos	37	(4)
2017–2018	Béziers	27	(3)
2018–2023	Paris FC	134	(9)
2023	Paris FC II	2	(0)
2023–2026	Pau	50	(0)

International career
2019–2022	Guinea	12	(0)
- * Club domestic league appearances and goals

Ousmane Kanté (born 21 September 1989) is a former professional footballer who played as a defender. Born in France, he played for Guinea national team.

== Early life ==
Kanté was born in Paris, to Guinean parents. He holds French and Guinean nationalities.

== Club career ==
Kanté began playing football at the age of six and joined the youth academy of US Créteil-Lusitanos. He spent his early career in the lower divisions of France. On 15 June 2018, he signed his first professional contract with Paris FC after playing a key role in promoting Béziers into the Ligue 2 in the 2017–18 season. He made his professional debut for Paris FC in a 1–1 Ligue 2 tie with Gazélec Ajaccio on 27 July 2018.

== International career ==
Kanté debuted for the Guinea national team in a 1–0 friendly loss to Comoros on 12 October 2019.

In January 2022, he was selected by the coach Kaba Diawara to participate in the 2021 Africa Cup of Nations in Cameroon.
