= Julien López =

Algerian footballer (born 1992)

Personal information
- Full name: Julien Yves Rémi López Baila
- Date of birth: 1 March 1992 (age 34)
- Place of birth: Marseille, France
- Height: 1.73 m (5 ft 8 in)
- Position: Winger

Team information
- Current team: Cannes
- Number: 20

Youth career
- 2007–2012: Montpellier

Senior career*
Years	Team	Apps	(Gls)
2012–2013	Albi	13	(2)
2013	Consolat	17	(1)
2014–2015	Fréjus Saint-Raphaël	22	(1)
2015–2017	Consolat	55	(18)
2017–2026	Paris FC	238	(30)
2017	Paris FC B	1	(0)
2026–	Cannes	0	(0)

International career
2009	Algeria U17	2	(0)
- * Club domestic league appearances and goals as of 19 May 2026

Julien Yves Rémi López Baila (born 1 March 1992), better known as Julien López, is a professional footballer who plays as a winger for Ligue 3 club Cannes. Born in France, he is a former Algeria youth international.

== Club career ==
A youth academy product of Montpellier, López signed his first professional contract with Paris FC of the Ligue 2 in June 2017 after a couple successful season with Consolat.

López made his professional debut with Paris FC in a Ligue 2 2–1 win over Bourg-en-Bresse on 4 August 2017. His first professional goal was the winner for Paris in a 2–1 win Auxerre on 25 August 2017.

On 19 June 2026, López signed with Cannes, recently promoted to Ligue 3.

== International career ==
López represented the Algeria U17s at the 2009 FIFA U-17 World Cup, making 2 appearances.

== Personal life ==
López was born in France to a French father of partially Spanish origin and an Algerian mother. His younger brother, Maxime Lopez, is also a footballer who represents the Serie A club Sassuolo and is a former youth international for France.

== Career statistics ==
As of match played 10 May 2025

Appearances and goals by club, season, and competition
Club	Season	League			National cup		League cup		Other		Total	
Club	Season	Division	Apps	Goals	Apps	Goals	Apps	Goals	Apps	Goals	Apps	Goals
Albi	2012–13	CFA	13	2	0	0	—		—		13	2
Consolat	2012–13	CFA	5	0	0	0	—		—		5	0
Consolat	2013–14	CFA	12	1	0	0	—		—		12	1
Consolat	Total		17	1	0	0	—		—		17	1
Fréjus Saint-Raphaël	2013–14	National	11	1	0	0	—		—		11	1
Fréjus Saint-Raphaël	2014–15	National	11	0	3	2	—		—		14	2
Fréjus Saint-Raphaël	Total		22	1	3	2	—		—		25	3
Consolat	2015–16	National	25	8	2	0	—		—		27	8
Consolat	2016–17	National	30	10	4	2	—		—		34	12
Consolat	Total		55	18	6	2	—		—		61	20
Paris FC	2017–18	Ligue 2	31	5	2	0	2	0	—		35	5
Paris FC	2018–19	Ligue 2	31	3	1	0	1	0	1	0	34	3
Paris FC	2019–20	Ligue 2	24	0	2	0	2	0	—		28	0
Paris FC	2020–21	Ligue 2	32	7	1	0	—		1	0	32	7
Paris FC	2021–22	Ligue 2	33	5	2	0	—		1	0	36	5
Paris FC	2022–23	Ligue 2	31	6	4	1	—		—		35	7
Paris FC	2023–24	Ligue 2	20	1	0	0	—		1	0	21	1
Paris FC	2024–25	Ligue 2	31	3	0	0	—		—		31	3
Paris FC	Total		233	30	12	1	5	0	4	0	254	31
Paris FC B	2017–18	National 3	1	0	—		—		—		1	0
Career total			341	52	21	5	5	0	4	0	371	57
