= Warren Caddy =

Footballer (born 1997)

Personal information
- Full name: Warren Caddy
- Date of birth: 9 April 1997 (age 29)
- Place of birth: Cagnes-sur-Mer, France
- Height: 1.83 m (6 ft 0 in)
- Position: Forward

Team information
- Current team: Randers
- Number: 10

Youth career
- Ajaccio

Senior career*
Years	Team	Apps	(Gls)
2015–2017	Ajaccio II	43	(14)
2015–2017	Ajaccio	4	(0)
2017–2018	Grasse	24	(4)
2018–2019	Colomiers	21	(3)
2019–2020	Sète	27	(11)
2020–2024	Paris FC	72	(7)
2023	Paris FC B	5	(0)
2023–2024	→ Annecy (loan)	10	(4)
2024–2026	Lausanne Ouchy	45	(27)
2026–	Randers	12	(2)

International career^{‡}
2023–	Madagascar	17	(5)
- * Club domestic league appearances and goals as of 19 May 2026 ‡ National team caps and goals as of 12 November 2026

Warren Caddy (born 9 April 1997) is a professional footballer who plays as a forward for Danish Superliga club Randers FC and the Madagascar national team.

== Career ==
A product of Ajaccio's youth system, Caddy made his senior debut on 17 April 2015, coming on as a substitute for Laurent Abergel in a 2–0 defeat to Troyes at the Stade de l'Aube.

On 24 January 2026, Warren Caddy signed for Randers FC on a three-and-a-half-year contract, joining the Danish Superliga club from Swiss Challenge League side FC Stade Lausanne-Ouchy. His arrival was officially announced by Randers FC, with Caddy immediately joining the squad on their winter training camp in Portugal and being assigned the number 10 shirt.

=== International career ===
List of international goals scored by Warren Caddy
No.	Date	Venue	Opponent	Score	Result	Competition
1	4 September 2025	Larbi Zaouli Stadium, Casablanca, Morocco	Central African Republic	1–0	2–0	2026 FIFA World Cup qualification
2	8 September 2025	Larbi Zaouli Stadium, Casablanca, Morocco	Chad	1–1	3–1	2026 FIFA World Cup qualification
3	28 March 2026	Bellis Hotel Sports Center, Belek, Turkey	Kyrgyzstan	3–0	5–2	Friendly
4	28 March 2026	Bellis Hotel Sports Center, Belek, Turkey	Kyrgyzstan	5–2	5–2	Friendly
5	12 November 2026	Meknes Honor Stadium, Meknes, Morocco	Guinea-Bissau	1–0	1–1	2027 Africa Cup of Nations qualification

== Personal life ==
Caddy was born in France and is of Martiniquais and Malagasy descent. In November 2023, he was called up to the Madagascar national team for a set of 2026 FIFA World Cup qualification matches.
