= Check Oumar Diakité =

French footballer (born 2002)

Personal information
- Date of birth: 5 December 2002 (age 23)
- Place of birth: Montreuil, France
- Height: 1.73 m (5 ft 8 in)
- Position: Midfielder

Team information
- Current team: Koper
- Number: 22

Youth career
- 2008–2015: Choiy-le-Roi
- 2015–2017: US Créteil-Lusitanos
- 2017–2019: Montrouge FC92
- 2019–2020: Paris FC

Senior career*
Years	Team	Apps	(Gls)
2020–2023	Paris FC II	8	(0)
2020–2023	Paris FC	36	(1)
2022–2023	→ Le Havre (loan)	11	(0)
2023–2025	Adanaspor	43	(0)
2025–	Koper	7	(1)

International career^{‡}
2021	France U20	4	(0)
- * Club domestic league appearances and goals as of 5 December 2025 ‡ National team caps and goals as of 11 November 2021

Check Oumar Diakité (born 5 December 2002) is a French professional footballer who plays as a midfielder for Slovenian club Koper.

== Early life ==
Born in Montreuil, Seine-Saint-Denis, Diakité went to several Francilian clubs, such as Choisy-le-Roi, Créteil and Montrouge FC92, before joining Paris FC in the summer of 2019.

== Club career ==
Diakité made his professional debut for Paris FC on the 21 November 2020, coming on as a half-time substitute against AJ Auxerre, as Paris FC, the then leaders of Ligue 2, where already down 3–0, eventually losing the game with that score.

He got his first debut a few weeks later against Clermont Foot, then ending the year with another debut in the 3–2 win against USL Dunkerque on the 22 December 2020.

In August 2023, Diakité signed for TFF First League club Adanaspor on a three-year deal.

== Personal life ==
Born in France, Diakité is of Malian descent.
