= Florent Hanin =

French footballer (born 1990)

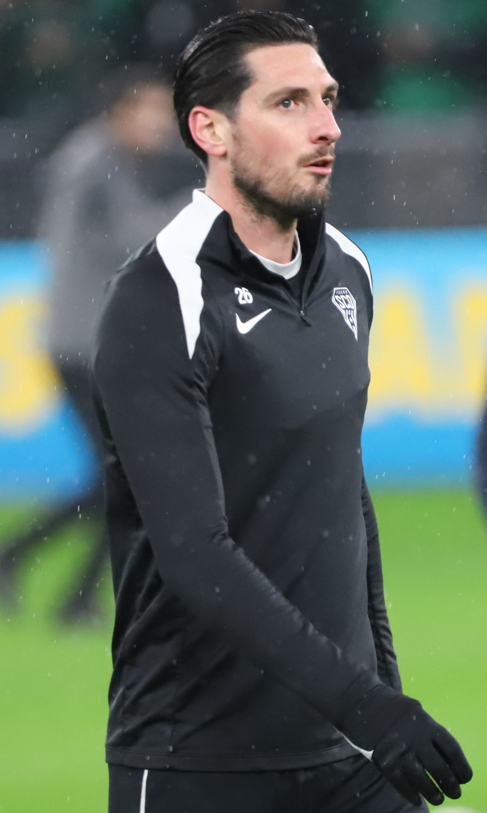
- Hanin with Angers in 2025

Personal information
- Full name: Florent Olivier Sylvain Hanin
- Date of birth: 4 February 1990 (age 36)
- Place of birth: Harfleur, France
- Height: 1.77 m (5 ft 10 in)
- Position: Left back

Team information
- Current team: Nea Salamis Famagusta

Senior career*
Years	Team	Apps	(Gls)
2008–2011	Le Havre B	65	(1)
2011–2012	Leixões	27	(1)
2012–2014	Braga	0	(0)
2012	Braga B	14	(0)
2013–2014	→ Moreirense (loan)	23	(0)
2014	→ Panetolikos (loan)	14	(0)
2014–2015	Lierse	9	(0)
2015–2016	Strømsgodset	26	(1)
2016	St. Gallen	18	(0)
2016–2018	Belenenses	68	(0)
2018–2020	Vitória de Guimarães	37	(2)
2020–2023	Paris FC	93	(1)
2023–2026	Angers	85	(2)
2026–	Nea Salamis Famagusta	0	(0)
- * Club domestic league appearances and goals as of 20 May 2026

Florent Olivier Sylvain Hanin (born 4 February 1990) is a French professional footballer who plays as a left back for Cypriot First Division club Nea Salamis Famagusta.

== Career ==
=== Le Havre ===
An academy product of French top division side Le Havre, Hanin started his senior career there in 2008. He was unable to break into the first team, and spent three years playing for the reserve team in the French amateur division.

=== Leixões ===
Hanin signed on a free transfer for Segunda Liga club Leixões S.C. on 18 May 2011. He was a regular starter for the club in the 2011–12 season, and stated in 2015 that this was his turning point for his professional career.

=== Braga ===
After his contract with Leixões expired, he was signed by Primeira Liga club S.C. Braga on 1 July 2012. However, he became the third choice for left back, and never played for the first team. He spent the first half season playing regularly for the reserve squad in Segunda Liga, before being sent on loan to fellow Primeira Liga club Moreirense F.C. on 15 January 2013. He played for the latter club for the rest of the 2012–13 season, but was unable to keep them from getting relegated. He had another loan spell at the club in the next season, but the loan was terminated on 1 January 2014. He was signed on a six-month loan by Greek Super League Panetolikos F.C. on 17 January 2014, and featured frequently for the club.

=== Lierse ===
On 1 July 2014, Hanin was signed by Belgian Pro League club Lierse S.K. on a permanent deal. Hanin describes this as «A very bad experience. It showed me the bad side of football, the worst period I've experienced.» After an initially good period, the team lost three matches and the coach was fired. Due to a conflict between the sporting director and the club president, a new coach with a radically different playing style was brought in. As Hanin struggled with the long-ball type of play, he did not play under the new coach. He was released by the club in the winter transfer window, having only played 9 matches for the club.

=== Strømsgodset ===
Hanin was signed on a one-year contract by Norwegian Tippeliga club Strømsgodset Toppfotball on 23 March 2015, becoming the only signing for the club before the 2015 season. The club commented that they had studied the French player thoroughly with the analysis program InStat Football, and described the player as an «offensive, quick and skilled left back».

Hanin told French football magazine So Foot that the Norwegian club originally wanted to sign him for two years, but due to a groin problem, the contract was set to one year, with a possible 2–3 year extension.

=== St. Gallen ===
On 5 January 2016, it was confirmed, that Hanin had signed a contract with Swiss Super League club FC St. Gallen.

=== Nea Salamis ===
On 16 July 2026, Hanin signed a contract with Nea Salamis Famagusta in Cyprus for one season, with an option to extend.

== Personal life ==
Hanin holds French and Portuguese nationalities.

== Career statistics ==
As of 17 May 2024

Appearances and goals by club, season and competition
Club	Season	League			Cup		League Cup		Europe		Other		Total	
Club	Season	Division	Apps	Goals	Apps	Goals	Apps	Goals	Apps	Goals	Apps	Goals	Apps	Goals
Le Havre B	2008–09	CFA	20	0	0	0	—		—		—		20	0
Le Havre B	2009–10	CFA	27	1	0	0	—		—		—		27	1
Le Havre B	2010–11	CFA	18	0	0	0	—		—		—		18	0
Le Havre B	Total		65	1	0	0	—		—		—		65	1
Leixões	2011–12	Segunda Liga	27	1	5	0	—		—		—		32	1
Braga B	2012–13	Segunda Liga	14	0	0	0	—		—		—		14	0
Moreirense	2012–13	Primeira Liga	12	0	0	0	—		—		—		12	0
Moreirense	2013–14	Segunda Liga	11	0	0	0	—		—		—		11	0
Moreirense	Total		23	0	0	0	—		—		—		23	0
Panetolikos	2013–14	Super League Greece	14	0	0	0	—		—		—		14	0
Lierse	2014–15	Belgian Pro League	9	0	1	0	—		—		—		10	0
Strømsgodset	2015	Tippeligaen	26	1	1	0	—		3	0	—		30	1
St. Gallen	2015–16	Swiss Super League	17	0	0	0	—		—		—		17	0
Belenenses	2016–17	Primeira Liga	34	0	1	0	3	0	—		—		38	0
Belenenses	2017–18	Primeira Liga	34	0	1	0	4	0	—		—		39	0
Belenenses	Total		68	0	2	0	7	0	—		—		77	0
Vitória Guimarães	2018–19	Primeira Liga	9	1	1	0	0	0	—		—		10	1
Vitória Guimarães	2019–20	Primeira Liga	28	1	1	0	4	0	9	0	—		42	1
Vitória Guimarães	Total		37	2	2	0	4	0	9	0	—		52	2
Paris FC	2020–21	Ligue 2	34	1	1	0	—		—		1	0	36	1
Paris FC	2021–22	Ligue 2	34	0	1	0	—		—		1	0	36	0
Paris FC	2022–23	Ligue 2	25	0	3	0	—		—		—		28	0
Paris FC	Total		93	1	5	0	—		—		2	0	100	1
Angers	2023–24	Ligue 2	27	1	3	0	—		—		—		30	1
Career total			420	8	19	0	11	0	12	0	2	0	464	8
