= 2025–26 Paris FC season =

Paris FC 2025–26 football season

Paris FC
2025–26 season
- CEO: Jean-Marc Gallot
- President: Pierre Ferracci
- Manager: Stéphane Gilli (until 22 February); Antoine Kombouaré (from 22 February)
- Stadium: Stade Jean-Bouin
- Ligue 1: 11th
- Coupe de France: Round of 16
- Top goalscorer: League: Ilan Kebbal (9); All: Ilan Kebbal (9)
- Highest home attendance: 19,237 (MD34 vs Paris Saint-Germain)
- Lowest home attendance: 14,879 (MD11 vs Nice)
- Average home league attendance: 16,899
- Biggest win: 4–0 vs Brest (MD32)
- Biggest defeat: 0–5 vs Lens (MD22)
Home colours	Away colours	Third colours

The 2025–26 season was the 57th season in the history of Paris FC. It marked the club's first season back in Ligue 1 after a 46-year absence, having earned promotion with a second-place finish in Ligue 2 the previous campaign. In addition to the domestic league, the club participated in the Coupe de France.

It was also the club's first season occupying Stade Jean-Bouin as their home ground, having vacated Stade Sébastien Charléty at the end of the 2024–25 campaign. The stadium was directly across the street from Parc de Princes, home stadium of rival club Paris Saint-Germain.

== Squad ==
Note: Flags indicate national team as defined under FIFA eligibility rules; some limited exceptions apply. Players may hold more than one non-FIFA nationality.

No.	Pos.	Nation	Player
1	GK	FRA	Rémy Riou
2	DF	FIN	Tuomas Ollila
4	MF	FRA	Vincent Marchetti
5	DF	SEN	Moustapha Mbow (captain)
6	DF	BRA	Otávio
7	FW	FRA	Alimami Gory
9	FW	FRA	Willem Geubbels
10	MF	ALG	Ilan Kebbal
11	FW	CIV	Jean-Philippe Krasso
13	MF	FRA	Mathieu Cafaro
14	DF	MLI	Hamari Traoré
15	DF	FRA	Timothée Kolodziejczak
16	GK	FRA	Obed Nkambadio
17	MF	FRA	Adama Camara
18	MF	ZIM	Marshall Munetsi (on loan from Wolverhampton Wanderers)
19	DF	FRA	Nhoa Sangui

No.	Pos.	Nation	Player
20	MF	ALG	Julien López
21	MF	FRA	Maxime Lopez
22	DF	MAR	Sofiane Alakouch
23	MF	FRA	Rudy Matondo
24	FW	ITA	Luca Koleosho (on loan from Burnley)
26	DF	SEN	Lamine Gueye
27	FW	NGR	Moses Simon
28	DF	BEL	Thibault De Smet
29	FW	FRA	Pierre-Yves Hamel
31	DF	ALG	Samir Chergui
33	MF	FRA	Pierre Lees-Melou
35	GK	GER	Kevin Trapp
36	FW	ITA	Ciro Immobile
42	DF	ITA	Diego Coppola (on loan from Brighton & Hove Albion)
93	FW	FRA	Jonathan Ikoné

== Transfers ==
=== In ===
Pos.	Player	Transferred from	Fee	Date	Source
LB	(France) Nhoa Sangui	(France) Reims	€9m	24 June 2025	
W	(Nigeria) Moses Simon	(France) Nantes	€7m	25 June 2025	
CB	(Brazil) Otávio	(Portugal) Porto	€12m	22 July 2025	
FW	(France) Willem Geubbels	(Switzerland) St. Gallen	€9m	17 August 2025	
GK	(Germany) Kevin Trapp	(Germany) Eintracht Frankfurt	€N/A	19 August 2025	
MF	(France) Pierre Lees-Melou	(France) Brest	€6.5m	28 August 2025	
FW	(France) Jonathan Ikoné	(Italy) Fiorentina	€3m	1 September 2025	
RB	(Mali) Hamari Traoré	(Spain) Real Sociedad	€4m	1 September 2025	
W	(Italy) Luca Koleosho	(Spain) Espanyol (on loan from Burnley)	Loan	9 January 2026	
MF	(Zimbabwe) Marshall Munetsi	(England) Wolverhampton	Loan	16 January 2026	
CB	(Italy) Diego Coppola	(England) Brighton	Loan	29 January 2026	
ST	(Italy) Ciro Immobile	(Italy) Bologna	€N/A	1 February 2026	
MF	(France) Rudy Matondo	(France) Auxerre	€17m	2 February 2026	
MF	(Ivory Coast) Patrick Zabi	(France) Reims	€25m	5 February 2026	

=== Out ===
Pos.	Player	Transferred to	Fee	Date	Source
W	(Switzerland) Josias Lukembila	(Switzerland) FC Sion	Free	18 June 2025	
FW	(France) Omar Sissoko	(France) Pau FC	Loan	19 August 2025	
LB	(France) Jules Gaudin	(Belgium) Charleroi	N/A	21 August 2025	
FW	(Madagascar) El Hadary Ylan	(France) Valenciennes	Loan	25 August 2025	
RB	(France) Dimitri Colau	(England) West Ham	N/A	28 August 2025	
RB	(Morocco) Mathys Tourraine	(France) Rodez	Loan	30 August 2025	
CB	(France) Yoan Koré	(Spain) Betis Deportivo	Loan (Option to Buy)	31 August 2025	
RB	(Morocco) Mathys Tourraine	(France) Clermont	Loan	14 January 2026	
W	(Mali) Nouha Dicko	N/A	Released	10 February 2026	

== Friendlies ==
=== Pre-season ===
Source: L'Equipe

16 July 2025 Friendly	Paris FC	0–1	Union Saint-Gilloise	Bonneuil-sur-Marne
19:00 CEST (UTC+2)			Ait El Hadj 54'	Stadium: Stade Léo Lagrange

25 July 2025 Friendly	Saint-Étienne	0–3	Paris FC	Thonon-les-Bains
19:00 CEST (UTC+2)			Marchetti 9', 33'; Kebbal 25'	Stadium: Stade Joseph-Moynat

29 July 2025 Friendly	FC Sion	1–3	Paris FC	Monthey
18:30 CEST (UTC+2)	Nivokazi 42'		Camara 10'; El Kit 80'; El Hadary 83'	Stadium: Stade Philippe Pottier

2 August 2025 Friendly	Paris FC	1–1	Le Havre	Orly
16:30 CEST (UTC+2)	Hamel 40'		Soumaré 8'	Stadium: Paris FC Training Ground

6 August 2025 Friendly	Paris FC	2–2	UNFP FC	Meudon
18:00 CEST (UTC+2)	Koré 5'; Cafaro 68'		Ouarshie 42', 87'	Stadium: Complex Sportif Marcel Bec

9 August 2025 Friendly	Nantes	2–3	Paris FC	Nantes
19:00 CEST (UTC+2)	Mohamed 20'; Leroux 43'		Krasso 15'; Gory 49'; Kebbal 53'	Stadium: Stade de la Beaujoire

=== In-Season ===
5 September 2025 Friendly	Paris FC	1–1	Troyes	Orly
16:30 CEST (UTC+2)				Stadium: Paris FC Training Ground

10 October 2025 Friendly	Paris FC	2–1	Le Mans	Orly
15:30 CEST (UTC+2)	Doucet 19'; Ikoné 38'			Stadium: Paris FC Training Ground

28 March 2026 Friendly	Paris FC	2–0	Red Star	Orly
11:30 CEST (UTC+2)	J. Lopez 15'; M. Lopez 35'			Stadium: Paris FC Training Ground

== Competitions ==
=== Overall record ===
Competition	First match	Last match	Starting round	Final position	Record							
Competition	First match	Last match	Starting round	Final position	Pld	W	D	L	GF	GA	GD	Win %
Ligue 1	17 August 2025	17 May 2026	Matchday 1	11th	34	11	11	12	47	50	−3	32.35
Coupe de France	20 December 2025	4 February 2026	Round of 64	Round of 16	3	2	0	1	4	2	+2	66.67
Total					37	13	11	13	51	52	−1	35.14

Source: Soccerway

=== Ligue 1 ===
==== League table ====
Pos	Team	Pld	W	D	L	GF	GA	GD	Pts
9	Toulouse	34	12	9	13	47	46	+1	45
10	Lorient	34	11	12	11	48	51	−3	45
11	Paris FC	34	11	11	12	47	50	−3	44
12	Brest	34	10	9	15	43	55	−12	39
13	Angers	34	9	9	16	29	48	−19	36

Source: Ligue 1
Rules for classification: 1) Points; 2) Goal difference; 3) Head-to-head points; 4) Head-to-head goal difference; 5) Head-to-head goals scored; 6) Head-to-head away goals scored; 7) Goals scored; 8) Away goals scored; 9) Fair-play points (Note: Head-to-head record is used only after all the matches between the teams in question have been played).

==== Results by round ====
Round	1	2	3	4	5	6	7	8	9	10	11	12	13	14	15	16	17	18	19	20	21	22	23	24	25	26	27	28	29	30	31	32	33	34
Ground	A	A	H	A	H	A	H	A	H	H	A	H	A	H	A	H	A	A	H	H	A	H	A	H	A	A	H	A	H	A	H	H	A	H
Result	L	L	W	W	L	D	W	L	L	D	W	L	L	D	D	L	L	W	D	D	D	L	D	W	D	D	W	D	W	W	L	W	L	W
Position	16	17	16	11	11	11	8	11	11	12	11	11	12	13	14	14	15	13	14	14	15	15	14	14	13	13	13	13	12	10	12	11	11	11

Source: Ligue 1
A = Away; H = Home; W = Win; D = Draw; L = Loss

==== Matches ====
The league schedule was released on 27 June 2025.

Win Draw Loss Fixture

17 August 2025 1	Angers	1–0	Paris FC	Angers
17:15 CEST (UTC+2)	Lepaul 9'; Belkhdim (yellow card) 40'; Mouton (red card) 57'; Arcus (yellow card) 93'	Report	Doucet (yellow card) 11'	Stadium: Stade Raymond Kopa; Attendance: 12,168; Referee: François Letexier

23 August 2025 2	Marseille	5–2	Paris FC	Marseille
17:00 CEST (UTC+2)	Greenwood 18' (pen.); Aubameyang 24', 73'; Højbjerg 81'; Vaz (yellow card) 88', (goal) 90+6'; Belkhdim (yellow card) 40'	Report	Kebbal 28'; Simon 58'	Stadium: Stade Vélodrome; Attendance: 64,074; Referee: Marc Bollengier

31 August 2025 3	Paris FC	3–2	Metz	Paris
17:15 CEST (UTC+2)	Kebbal 45+3' (pen.), 52'; Simon 67'; Otávio (yellow card) 69'	Report	Sane 22'; Sane (yellow card) 45+1' (yellow-red card) 80'; Traoré 54'	Stadium: Stade Jean-Bouin; Attendance: 17,345; Referee: Jérémy Stinat

14 September 2025 4	Brest	1–2	Paris FC	Brest
17:15 CEST (UTC+2)	Del Castillo 52' (pen.)	Report	Geubbels 14'; Marchetti (yellow card) 23', (goal) 34'; Lees-Melou (yellow card) 51'; Otávio (red card) 84'	Stadium: Stade Francis-Le Blé; Attendance: 14,594; Referee: Bastien Dechepy

21 September 2025 5	Paris FC	2–3	Strasbourg	Paris
15:00 CEST (UTC+2)	Dicko 81'; Gory 90+4'	Report	Godo (yellow card) 21'; Paez 27'; Sarr (yellow card) 74'; Doue 78'; Emegha 87', (yellow card) 90'; Barco (yellow card) 90+2'; Penders (yellow card) 90+10'	Stadium: Stade Jean-Bouin; Attendance: 17,912; Referee: François Letexier

28 September 2025 6	Nice	1–1	Paris FC	Nice
15:00 CEST (UTC+2)	Samed (yellow card) 13'; Diop 40'	Report	Mbow (yellow card) 23'; Krasso 88' (pen.)	Stadium: Allianz Riviera; Attendance: 20,049; Referee: Abdelatif Kherradji

3 October 2025 7	Paris FC	2–0	Lorient	Paris
20:45 CEST (UTC+2)	Kebbal 25'; Krasso 30'	Report	Kouassi (yellow card) 45+1'; Faye (yellow card) 52'	Stadium: Stade Jean-Bouin; Attendance: 18,084; Referee: Benoît Millot

19 October 2025 8	Lens	2–1	Paris FC	Lens
15:00 CEST (UTC+2)	Édouard 25'; Thauvin (yellow card) 46'; Baidoo 64'; Sima (yellow card) 90'	Report	Kebbal (yellow card) 8'; Lees-Melou 27'; Traoré (yellow card) 55'	Stadium: Stade Bollaert-Delelis; Attendance: 33,773; Referee: Gaël Angoula

23 October 2025 9	Paris FC	1–2	Nantes	Paris
20:45 CEST (UTC+2)	Chergui 15'; Traoré (yellow card) 47'; Lopez (yellow card) 65'; De Smet (yellow card) 69'	Report	El Arabi 2'; Mwanga (yellow card) 24'; Abline 38'; Kwon (yellow card) 65'	Stadium: Stade Jean-Bouin; Attendance: 17,522; Referee: Ruddy Buquet

29 October 2025 10	Paris FC	3–3	Lyon	Paris
21:05 CET (UTC+1)	Chergui (yellow card) 25'; Camara (yellow card) 32'; De Smet (yellow card) 35' (yellow-red card) 67'; Camara 65'; Lees-Melou (yellow card) 73'; Kebbal 77'; Marchetti 84'	Report	Tolisso 5'; Karabec (yellow card) 45+1'; Šulc 51', 58'; De Carvalho (yellow card) 55'; Abner (red card) 61'	Stadium: Stade Jean-Bouin; Attendance: 18,445; Referee: Jérémy Stinat

1 November 2025 11	Monaco	0–1	Paris FC	Fontvieille
19:00 CET (UTC+1)	Coulibaly (yellow card) 81'; Minamino (yellow card) 85'; Fati (yellow card) 90+8'	Report	Otávio (yellow card) 36'; Camara (yellow card) 47'; Simon 53'	Stadium: Stade Louis II; Attendance: 10,727; Referee: Eric Wattellier

7 November 2025 12	Paris FC	0–1	Rennes	Paris
20:45 CET (UTC+1)	De Smet (yellow card) 57'; Lopez (yellow card) 79'; Otávio (yellow card) 90+3'; Kebbal (yellow card) 90+6'	Report	Camara (yellow card) 74'; Embolo 81'; Rouault (yellow card) 90+2'	Stadium: Stade Jean-Bouin; Attendance: 16,587; Referee: Guillaume Paradis

23 November 2025 13	Lille	4–2	Paris FC	Lille
20:45 CET (UTC+1)	Igamane (yellow card) 29'; Giroud 40', 77' (pen.); Mandi 80'; Broholm 90+6' (pen.)	Report	Geubbels 11'; Traoré (yellow card) 66'; Doucet 84', (yellow card) 90+4'	Stadium: Stade Pierre-Mauroy; Attendance: 39,053; Referee: Benoît Millot

29 November 2025 14	Paris FC	1–1	Auxerre	Paris
19:00 CET (UTC+1)	Kebbal 32' (pen.); Otávio (yellow card) 39'; Ikoné (yellow card) 81'	Report	Diomande 40'; Namaso (yellow card) 59'	Stadium: Stade Jean-Bouin; Attendance: 15,007; Referee: François Letexier

7 December 2025 15	Le Havre	0–0	Paris FC	Le Havre
17:15 CET (UTC+1)		Report	Lopez (yellow card) 78'; Camara (yellow card) 89'	Stadium: Stade Océane; Attendance: 17,460; Referee: Ruddy Buquet

13 December 2025 16	Paris FC	0–3	Toulouse	Paris
21:05 CET (UTC+1)	Camara (yellow card) 73'; Lopez (yellow card) 88'; Otávio (yellow card) 89'	Report	Hidalgo 29'; Gboho 37', 69'; Methalie (yellow card) 45'	Stadium: Stade Jean-Bouin; Attendance: 15,822; Referee: Bastien Dechepy

4 January 2026 17	Paris Saint-Germain	2–1	Paris FC	Paris
20:45 CET (UTC+1)	Doué 45'; Zabarnyi (yellow card) 49'; Dembélé 53'	Report	Geubbels 51' (pen.)	Stadium: Parc des Princes; Attendance: 47,892; Referee: Benoît Bastien

18 January 2026 18	Nantes	1–2	Paris FC	Nantes
17:15 CET (UTC+1)	Tati (yellow card) 23'; Abline 50'	Report	Kebbal 6', (yellow card) 29'; Lopez (yellow card) 35'; Kolodziejczak (yellow card) 60'; Koleosho 78'	Stadium: Stade de la Beaujoire; Attendance: 24,768; Referee: Benoît Millot

25 January 2026 19	Paris FC	0–0	Angers	Paris
17:15 CET (UTC+1)	Kolodziejczak (yellow card) 25'	Report	Belkebla (yellow card) 67'	Stadium: Stade Jean-Bouin; Attendance: 15,003; Referee: Thomas Léonard

31 January 2026 20	Paris FC	2–2	Marseille	Paris
17:00 CET (UTC+1)	Lopez (yellow card) 43'; Ikoné 82'; Kebbal 90+4' (pen.)	Report	Greenwood 18' (pen.); Aubameyang 53'; Medina (yellow card) 72'; Traorè (yellow card) 81'; Rulli (yellow card) 90+2'; Nadir (yellow card) 90+6'	Stadium: Stade Jean-Bouin; Attendance: 19,209; Referee: Jérémie Pignard

8 February 2026 21	Auxerre	0–0	Paris FC	Auxerre
17:00 CET (UTC+1)	Sinayoko (yellow card) 59'	Report	Camara (yellow card) 8'; Kebbal (yellow card) 34'; Lopez (yellow card) 72'; Mbow (yellow card) 90+2'	Stadium: Stade de l'Abbé-Deschamps; Attendance: 15,834; Referee: François Letexier

14 February 2026 22	Paris FC	0–5	Lens	Paris
21:05 CET (UTC+1)	Lees-Melou (yellow card) 83'; Matondo (yellow card) 84'	Report	Saïd 24', 38', (yellow card) 45+4'; Thauvin 58' (pen.); Fofana 90', 90+5'	Stadium: Stade Jean-Bouin; Attendance: 17,536; Referee: Bastien Dechepy

21 February 2026 23	Toulouse	1–1	Paris FC	Toulouse
19:00 CET (UTC+1)	Methalie (yellow card) 34'; Vignolo 87'; Cásseres (yellow card) 90+7'	Report	Munetsi 39'; Coppola (yellow card) 44'; Kebbal (yellow card) 54'; Trapp (yellow card) 68'; Otávio (yellow card) 77'; De Smet (yellow card) 90+7'	Stadium: Stadium de Toulouse; Attendance: 23,200; Referee: Benoît Millot

1 March 2026 24	Paris FC	1–0	Nice	Paris
15:00 CET (UTC+1)	Lees-Melou (yellow card) 22'; Munetsi 26'; De Smet (yellow card) 43' (yellow-red card) 90+5'; Immobile (yellow card) 66'; Trapp (yellow card) 90+3'	Report	Carlos (yellow card) 19'; Boudache (yellow card) 78'; Cho (yellow card) 90+5'	Stadium: Stade Jean-Bouin; Attendance: 14,879; Referee: Hakim Ben El Hadj

8 March 2026 25	Lyon	1–1	Paris FC	Lyon
20:45 CET (UTC+1)	Morton (yellow card) 27'; Tagliafico (yellow card) 50'; Tolisso 90+6' (pen.)	Report	Munetsi 63'	Stadium: Parc Olympique Lyonnais; Attendance: 42,148; Referee: Eric Wattellier

15 March 2026 26	Strasbourg	0–0	Paris FC	Strasbourg
15:00 CET (UTC+1)	Omobamidele (yellow card) 37'	Report		Stadium: Stade de la Meinau; Attendance: 29,865; Referee: Benoît Millot

22 March 2026 27	Paris FC	3–2	Le Havre	Paris
17:15 CET (UTC+1)	Immobile 29'; Seko 33' (o.g.); Matondo (red card); Gory 86'	Report	Ndiaye 61'; Ebonog (yellow card) 66'; Kyeremeh 90+2'	Stadium: Stade Jean-Bouin; Attendance: 15,612; Referee: Clément Turpin

5 April 2026 28	Lorient	1–1	Paris FC	Lorient
17:15 CEST (UTC+2)	Dieng 54'; Kouassi (yellow card) 85'	Report	Camara (yellow card) 50'; Munetsi 74'; Lees-Melou (yellow card) 79'	Stadium: Stade du Moustoir; Attendance: 16,211; Referee: Gaël Angoula

10 April 2026 29	Paris FC	4–1	Monaco	Paris
19:00 CEST (UTC+2)	Ikoné 4', 21'; Immobile 8'; Camara (yellow card) 59'; Koleosho 71'	Report	Balogun 36'	Stadium: Stade Jean-Bouin; Attendance: 16,520; Referee: Eric Wattellier

19 April 2026 30	Metz	1–3	Paris FC	Metz
17:15 CEST (UTC+2)	Mboula (yellow card) 13'; Kvilitaia 31'; Kouao (yellow card) 38'	Report	Gory 21', (yellow card) 62'; Otávio 69'; Kebbal (yellow card) 45+1', (goal) 89'	Stadium: Stade Saint-Symphorien; Attendance: 19,409; Referee: Jérémy Stinat

26 April 2026 31	Paris FC	0–1	Lille	Paris
17:15 CEST (UTC+2)	Mbow (yellow card) 10'; Ikoné (yellow card) 72'; Lees-Melou (yellow card) 84' (yellow-red card) 85'; Kebbal (yellow card) 90'; Gory (yellow card) 90+4'	Report	Fernandez-Pardo 27' (pen.); Bouaddi (yellow card) 49'; André (yellow card) 63'; Ngoy (yellow card) 90+4'	Stadium: Stade Jean-Bouin; Attendance: 17,243; Referee: Mathieu Vernice

3 May 2026 32	Paris FC	4–0	Brest	Paris
17:15 CEST (UTC+2)	Matondo 13', 67'; Geubbels 20'; Traoré (yellow card) 24'; Mbow (yellow card) 35'; Koleosho 89'	Report	Chardonnet (yellow card) 26'	Stadium: Stade Jean-Bouin; Attendance: 15,318; Referee: Mathieu Vernice

10 May 2026 33	Rennes	2–1	Paris FC	Rennes
21:00 CEST (UTC+2)	Lepaul 74'; Embolo 75'	Report	Geubbels 53'; Immobile (yellow card) 89'	Stadium: Roazhon Park; Attendance: 28,074; Referee: Thomas Léonard

17 May 2026 34	Paris FC	2–1	Paris Saint-Germain	Paris
21:00 CEST (UTC+2)	Gory 76', 90+4', (yellow card) 90+4'; Lopez (yellow card) 92'	Report	Barcola 50'; Mayulu (yellow card) 66'	Stadium: Stade Jean-Bouin; Attendance: 19,237; Referee: Guillaume Paradis

=== Coupe de France ===
20 December 2025 Round of 64	Raon-l'Étape	0–3	Paris FC	Raon-l'Étape
18:00 CET (UTC+1)	Radisavljevic (yellow card) 45+1'; Afangbom (yellow card) 73'	Report	Ikoné 32', 79', 87' (pen.); Cafaro (yellow card) 27'	Stadium: Stade Paul Gasser; Referee: Aurelien Petit

12 January 2026 Round of 32	Paris Saint-Germain	0–1	Paris FC	Paris
21:10 CET (UTC+1)	Doué (yellow card) 78'; Barcola (yellow card) 87'	Report	Ikoné 74'; De Smet (yellow card) 83'; Otávio (yellow card) 90'	Stadium: Parc des Princes; Attendance: 47,000; Referee: Ruddy Buquet

4 February 2026 Round of 16	Lorient	2–0	Paris FC	Lorient
20:30 CET (UTC+1)	Talbi (yellow card) 42'; Cadiou 55'; Avom (yellow card) 78'; Mbow 82' (o.g.)	Report	Koleosho (yellow card) 19'; Ikoné (yellow card) 30'; Matondo (yellow card) 90+1'	Stadium: Stade du Moustoir; Attendance: 13,457; Referee: Mathieu Vernice
