= Nouha Dicko =

Footballer (born 1992)

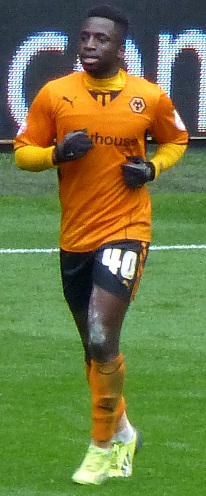
- Dicko in 2014

Personal information
- Full name: Nouha Dicko
- Date of birth: 14 May 1992 (age 34)
- Place of birth: Saint-Maurice, Val-de-Marne, France
- Height: 1.73 m (5 ft 8 in)
- Positions: Winger; forward

Youth career
- 2004–2007: Créteil
- 2007–2009: Strasbourg

Senior career*
Years	Team	Apps	(Gls)
2009–2011	Strasbourg B	42	(12)
2010–2011	Strasbourg	3	(0)
2011–2014	Wigan Athletic	0	(0)
2012	→ Blackpool (loan)	10	(4)
2012–2013	→ Blackpool (loan)	22	(5)
2013	→ Wolverhampton Wanderers (loan)	4	(1)
2013	→ Rotherham United (loan)	5	(5)
2014–2017	Wolverhampton Wanderers	94	(31)
2017–2020	Hull City	47	(6)
2019–2020	→ Vitesse (loan)	19	(4)
2020–2022	Gaziantep	46	(5)
2022	Yeni Malatyaspor	15	(4)
2022–2024	OFI	47	(9)
2024–2026	Paris FC	56	(7)
2026	Al Bataeh	4	(0)

International career^{‡}
2014–2018	Mali	3	(0)
- * Club domestic league appearances and goals as of 03:27, 26 January 2026 (UTC) ‡ National team caps and goals as of 8 December 2018

Nouha Dicko (born 14 May 1992) is a professional footballer who plays as a forward. Born in France, he played for the Mali national team.

== Early life ==
Dicko was born in Saint-Maurice, Val-de-Marne, a commune in the suburbs of Paris. He grew up in the city with his family, who originate from Mali.

== Club career ==
=== Early career ===
Dicko began playing football at the age of six with local club Jeanne d'Arc de Maisons-Alfort. At the age of 13, he was signed by Créteil, staying at the club for three seasons, before moving to Strasbourg in the spring of 2007.

Following his arrival, Dicko's progress was hindered by a number of injuries during his first season at the club, including an ankle injury that kept him out of action for four months. He made his debut for Strasbourg's reserve team in the 2009–10, impressing on a number of occasions, despite the team's relegation to CFA 2. His first-team debut came during the following season against Stade Plabennecois in a Championnat National match in September 2010.

=== Wigan Athletic ===
In 2011, Strasbourg released Dicko due to financial difficulties, and he was offered a trial with Premier League side Wigan Athletic, signing with the club a few weeks later. He made his senior debut for Wigan on 13 September 2011, in a League Cup match against Crystal Palace.

On 27 January 2012, he joined Blackpool on loan until the end of the season. He scored his first goal for the club in a 3–1 win against Doncaster Rovers, and went on to score four goals in 11 league appearances for the club. He came on as a substitute in Blackpool's 2–1 defeat in the 2012 Championship play-off final against West Ham United. He re-signed for Blackpool on a season-long loan on 17 August 2012. He was recalled from his loan on 3 January 2013.

On 28 March 2013, Dicko moved on loan again, entering his first spell with English Championship club Wolverhampton Wanderers. He made only four substitute appearances, scoring once, as the club unsuccessfully fought to avoid relegation under Dean Saunders.

Dicko began the 2013–14 season by appearing as a substitute in Wigan's Community Shield defeat to league champions Manchester United. However, new Wigan manager Owen Coyle did not select him for any league games and Dicko's only playing time for the club came in the Europa League and League Cup.

In November 2013, he was loaned out to League One club Rotherham United until January 2014. He was recalled by new Wigan manager Uwe Rösler in late December.

=== Wolverhampton Wanderers ===
On 13 January 2014, Dicko moved to Wolverhampton Wanderers, then in the third tier, for a reported fee of £300,000, signing a 2 1/2-year contract. Dicko scored two goals on his second debut for the club, on 25 January 2014. On 18 April, he scored a hat-trick against Rotherham United in a 6–4 victory. He ended the 2013–14 season as the club's top scorer, as they won promotion as champions.

Back at Championship level, Dicko was the club's joint top goalscorer in the following season, as the club missed out on the play-offs due to goal difference. He signed a new three-year contract with the club during the close season, and was given the squad number 9. However, in September 2015, Dicko suffered a knee ligament damage during a match against Charlton, which ultimately forced him to miss the remainder of the season.

After further delays to his comeback, Dicko returned to first-team football in October 2016, over 13 months since his last appearance and signed a new contract, which was due to keep him at Wolves until the summer of 2020. He made 32 appearances during the campaign, but scored just three times. At the start of the following season, Dicko was largely only used as a substitute by new coach Nuno Espírito Santo, but still scored twice in seven appearances; his final goal for the club came against the team he was about to join.

=== Hull City ===
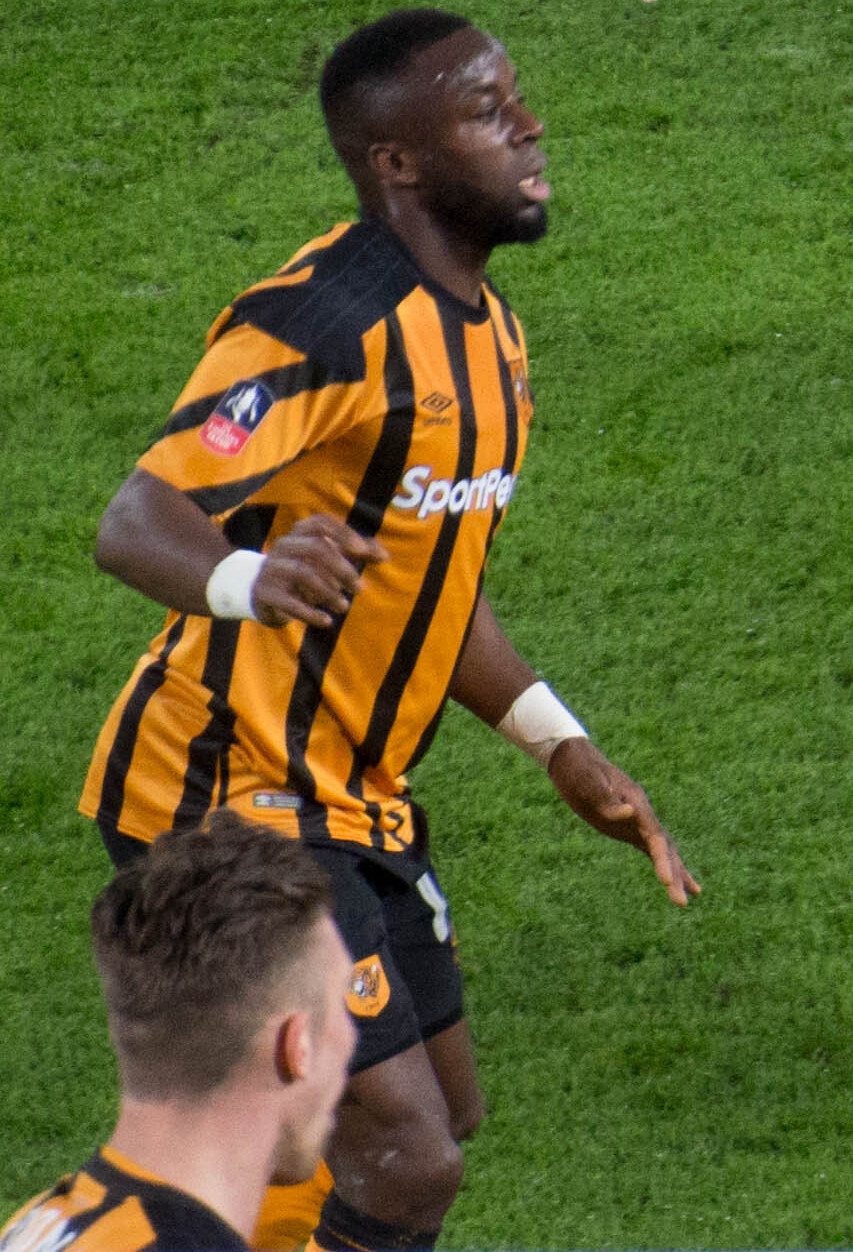
Dicko playing for Hull City in 2018

On 29 August 2017, Dicko joined fellow Championship club Hull City for an undisclosed fee in a three-year deal. On 8 September 2017, he made his debut in a 5–0 loss away to Derby County. He scored his first goal for the club on 14 October 2017, when he opened the scoring in a 1–1 draw away to Norwich City.

On 2 September 2019, Dicko joined Eredivisie club Vitesse on loan for the rest of the season.

On 30 June 2020, Hull indicated that Dicko would leave the club following the expiry of his contract.

=== Gaziantep ===
On 1 October 2020, Dicko joined Turkish Süper Lig club Gaziantep on a two-year contract.

=== Yeni Malatyaspor ===
In January 2022, Dicko joined Yeni Malatyaspor on a 1.5 year contract with an additional 1 year option. Dicko would wear jersey 94.

=== OFI ===
In July 2022 he signed for Greek club OFI.

=== Paris FC ===
On 31 January 2024, Dicko joined Paris FC on a one-and-a-half-year contract. On 11 February 2026, his contracted with the club was terminated.

=== Al-Bataeh ===
On 11 February 2026, Dicko joined UAE Pro League club Al Bataeh.

== International career ==
Although born and raised in France, Dicko is eligible to play for the Mali national football team through his parents, who both come from the Yélimané Cercle area. He was called up by Mali to their international squad in May 2014. He made his debut on 25 May 2014 in a friendly against Guinea, played in Colombes, France. In November 2014, he picked up an injury while on international duty.

== Career statistics ==
As of match played 21 May 2024

Appearances and goals by club, season and competition
Club	Season	League			National cup		League cup		Other		Total	
Club	Season	Division	Apps	Goals	Apps	Goals	Apps	Goals	Apps	Goals	Apps	Goals
Strasbourg B	2009–10	Championnat de France Amateur	18	4	—		—		—		18	4
Strasbourg B	2010–11	Championnat de France Amateur 2	24	8	—		—		—		24	8
Strasbourg B	Total		42	12	—		—		—		42	12
Strasbourg	2010–11	Championnat National	3	0	1	0	0	0	0	0	4	0
Wigan Athletic	2011–12	Premier League	0	0	0	0	1	0	0	0	1	0
Wigan Athletic	2012–13	Premier League	0	0	3	0	0	0	0	0	3	0
Wigan Athletic	2013–14	Championship	0	0	1	0	1	0	3 (Note: One appearance in FA Community Shield and two in the Europa League)	0	5	0
Wigan Athletic	Total		0	0	4	0	2	0	3	0	9	0
Blackpool (loan)	2011–12	Championship	10	4	3	0	0	0	3 (Note: Appearances in Football League Championship play-offs)	0	16	4
Blackpool (loan)	2012–13	Championship	22	5	0	0	0	0	0	0	22	5
Blackpool (loan)	Total		32	9	3	0	0	0	3	0	38	9
Wolverhampton Wanderers (loan)	2012–13	Championship	4	1	0	0	0	0	0	0	4	1
Rotherham United (loan)	2013–14	League One	5	5	0	0	0	0	1 (Note: Appearance in Football League Trophy)	1	6	6
Wolverhampton Wanderers	2013–14	League One	19	13	0	0	0	0	0	0	19	13
Wolverhampton Wanderers	2014–15	Championship	37	14	2	0	1	1	0	0	40	15
Wolverhampton Wanderers	2015–16	Championship	5	0	0	0	1	1	0	0	6	1
Wolverhampton Wanderers	2016–17	Championship	30	3	2	0	0	0	0	0	32	3
Wolverhampton Wanderers	2017–18	EFL Championship	5	1	0	0	2	1	0	0	7	2
Wolverhampton Wanderers	Total		96	31	4	0	4	3	0	0	104	34
Hull City	2017–18	Championship	29	4	2	1	0	0	—		31	5
Hull City	2018–19	Championship	16	2	1	0	2	0	—		19	2
Hull City	2019–20	Championship	2	0	0	0	2	0	—		4	0
Hull City	Total		47	6	3	1	4	0	—		54	7
Vitesse (loan)	2019–20	Eredivisie	19	4	3	1	—		—		22	5
Gaziantep	2020–21	Süper Lig	28	4	0	0	—		—		28	4
Gaziantep	2021–22	Süper Lig	18	1	1	0	—		—		19	1
Gaziantep	Total		46	5	1	0	—		—		47	5
Yeni Malatyaspor	2021–22	Süper Lig	15	4	—		—		—		15	4
OFI	2022–23	Super League Greece	30	6	0	0	—		—		30	6
Paris FC	2023–24	Ligue 2	16	5	0	0	—		1 (Note: Appearance in Ligue 2 promotion play-offs)	1	17	6
Paris FC	2024–25	Ligue 2	32	1	1	1	—		—		33	2
Paris FC	2025–26	Ligue 1	8	1	0	0	—		—		8	1
Paris FC	Total		56	7	1	1	—		1	1	58	9
Career total			395	89	20	3	10	3	8	2	433	97

== Honours ==
Wolverhampton Wanderers

- Football League One: 2013–14
