= 2024–25 Paris FC season =

Paris FC
2024–25 season
- Chairman: Pierre Ferracci
- Manager: Stéphane Gilli
- Stadium: Stade Sébastien Charléty
- Ligue 2: 2nd (promoted)
- Coupe de France: Round 7

The 2024–25 season was the 56th season in the history of the Paris FC, and the club's eighth consecutive season in Ligue 2. In addition to the domestic league, the team also participated in the Coupe de France. With a second-place league finish, on 2 May 2025 the team earned automatic promotion to Ligue 1, ending a 46-year absence from the top division.

This season also marked the beginning of the Arnault family's majority ownership of the team as of 29 November 2024, and the team's last season occupying Stade Sébastien Charléty, with a move to Stade Jean-Bouin planned for the 2025-26 season.

== Transfers ==
=== In ===
Pos.	Player	Transferred from	Fee	Date	Source
FW	(Ivory Coast) Jean-Philippe Krasso	(Serbia) Red Star Belgrade	€1,500,000	6 July 2024	

=== Out ===
Pos.	Player	Transferred to	Fee	Date	Source
GK	(Croatia) Ivan Filipović	(Croatia) Dinamo Zagreb		1 July 2024	

== Friendlies ==
=== Pre-season ===
17 July 2024 Friendly	Troyes	1–2	Paris FC
17:00

26 July 2024 Friendly	Thonon Evian	0–2	Paris FC
17:30

31 July 2024 Friendly	Clermont	1–3	Paris FC
17:30

== Competitions ==
=== Overall record ===
Competition	First match	Last match	Starting round	Record							
Competition	First match	Last match	Starting round	Pld	W	D	L	GF	GA	GD	Win %
Ligue 2	17 August 2024	10 May 2025	Matchday 1	34	21	6	7	55	33	+22	61.76
Coupe de France	15 November 2024	15 November 2024	Round 7	1	0	1	0	1	1	+0	0.00
Total				35	21	7	7	56	34	+22	60.00

Last updated: 22 March 2025
Source: Soccerway

=== Ligue 2 ===
==== League table ====
Pos	Team	Pld	W	D	L	GF	GA	GD	Pts	Promotion or Relegation
1	Lorient (C, P)	34	22	5	7	68	31	+37	71	Promotion to Ligue 1
2	Paris FC (P)	34	21	6	7	55	33	+22	69	Promotion to Ligue 1
3	Metz (O, P)	34	18	11	5	63	34	+29	65	Qualification for promotion play-offs final
4	Dunkerque	34	17	5	12	47	40	+7	56	Qualification for promotion play-offs semi-final
5	Guingamp	34	17	4	13	57	45	+12	55	Qualification for promotion play-offs semi-final

Source: Ligue 2
Rules for classification: 1) Points; 2) Goal difference; 3) Number of goals scored; 4) Head-to-head goal difference; 5) Fair play points
(C) Champions; (O) Play-off winners; (P) Promoted

==== Matches ====
The league schedule was released on 21 June 2024.

Win Draw Loss Fixture

17 August 2024 1	Caen	0–2	Paris FC	Caen
14:30 CEST (UTC+2)	Lebreton (yellow card) 28'; Meddah (yellow card) 64'; Debohi (yellow card) 74'	Report	Gory 76' (yellow card) 83'; Kebbal 86' (pen.)	Stadium: Stade Michel d'Ornano; Attendance: 16,639; Referee: Pierre Gaillouste

23 August 2024 2	Paris FC	3–2	Dunkerque	Amiens
20:00 CEST (UTC+2)	Kebbal (yellow card) 48'; López 79'; Kolodziejczak 88'; Sissoko 90'	Report	Yassine 65' (yellow card) 68'; Kolodziejczak (OG) 88'; Fernandez-Veliz (yellow card) 90+4'	Stadium: Stade de la Licorne; Attendance: 688; Referee: Ahmed Taleb

30 August 2024 3	Clermont	0–1	Paris FC	Clermont-Ferrand
20:00 UTC+2	M'Bahia (red card) 90+3'	Report	Krasso 12'; Marchetti (yellow card) 38'	Stadium: Stade Gabriel-Montpied; Referee: Geoffrey Kubler

14 September 2024 4	Paris FC	1–2	Metz	Paris
14:30 UTC+2	Dicko 31'; Tourraine (yellow card) 76'	Report	Sabaly 13'; Udol 25' (yellow card) 71'; Deminguet (yellow card) 30'; Sané (yellow card) 38'	Stadium: Stade Sébastien Charléty; Referee: Mickaël Leleu

20 September 2024 5	Bastia	2–1	Paris FC	Bastia
20:00 UTC+2	Boutrah 21'; Vincent (yellow card) 33'; Cissé 35'; Tavares (red card) 45+3'; Maggiotti (yellow card) 45+4'; Tramoni (yellow card) 90+2'	Report	Camara 10'; Krasso (yellow card) 8' (yellow-red card) 62'; Lopez (yellow card) 45+4'; Marchetti (red card) 45+7'; Lopez (yellow card) 77'	Stadium: Stade Armand-Cesari; Attendance: 10,642; Referee: Antoine Valnet

24 September 2024 6	Paris FC	2–0	Guingamp	Paris
20:30 UTC+2	López 10'; Kebbal 75' (pen.)	Report		Stadium: Stade Sébastien Charléty; Attendance: 6,484; Referee: Guillaume Paradis

28 September 2024 7	Red Star	1–3	Paris FC	Saint-Ouen-sur-Seine
14:00 UTC+2	Doucouré 32'	Report	Camara 20'; Krasso 45+1' (pen.); Krasso 57'	Stadium: Stade Bauer; Attendance: 4,525; Referee: Mikaël Lesage

4 October 2024 8	Paris FC	1–0	Laval	Paris
20:00 UTC+2	Hamel 83'	Report		Stadium: Stade Sébastien Charléty; Referee: Aurélien Petit

21 October 2024 9	Troyes	0–3	Paris FC	Troyes
20:45 UTC+2		Report	Krasso 19'; Krasso 40'; Kebbal 73'	Stadium: Stade de l'Aube; Attendance: 5,555; Referee: Geoffrey Kubler

26 October 2024 10	Paris FC	2–1	Grenoble	Paris
14:00 UTC+2	Lopez 37'; Kebbal 45'	Report	Ba 82'	Stadium: Stade Sébastien Charléty; Attendance: 15,412; Referee: Benoît Millot

29 October 2024 11	Amiens	0–0	Paris FC	Amiens
20:30 UTC+1		Report		Stadium: Stade de la Licorne; Attendance: 8,454; Referee: Rémi Landry

1 November 2024 12	Paris FC	3–3	Rodez	Paris
20:00 UTC+1	Doucet 34'; Lopez 53'; Krasso 67'	Report	Galves 10'; Baldé 37'; Baldé 48'	Stadium: Stade Sébastien Charléty; Attendance: 12,377; Referee: Faouzi Benchabane

9 November 2024 13	Pau	0–0	Paris FC	Pau
14:00 CET (UTC+1)	Mohamed (yellow card) 65'	Report	Doucet (yellow card) 44'; Marchetti (yellow card) 50'	Stadium: Nouste Camp; Attendance: 3,025; Referee: Mikaël Lesage

23 November 2024 14	Paris FC	0–0	Annecy	Paris
14:00 CET (UTC+1)		Report		Stadium: Stade Sébastien Charléty; Attendance: 10,673; Referee: Ruddy Buquet

7 December 2024 15	Ajaccio	0–2	Paris FC	Ajaccio
20:00 CET (UTC+1)		Report	Marchetti 55'; Krasso 90+4'	Stadium: Stade Michel-Moretti; Attendance: 2,807; Referee: Jérémy Stinat

14 December 2024 16	Lorient	2–0	Paris FC	Lorient
14:00 CET (UTC+1)	Ponceau 13'; Soumano 90+7' (pen.)	Report		Stadium: Stade du Moustoir; Attendance: 13,963; Referee: Guillaume Paradis

3 January 2025 17	Paris FC	1–2	Martigues	Paris
20:00 CET (UTC+1)	Krasso 13'	Report	Montiel 47'; Tlili 85'	Stadium: Stade Charléty; Attendance: 5,580; Referee: Antoine Valnet

11 January 2025 18	Paris FC	1–0	Amiens	Paris
14:00 CET (UTC+1)	Hamel 50'	Report		Stadium: Stade Charléty; Attendance: 6,501; Referee: Pierre Legat

18 January 2025 19	Metz	3–1	Paris FC	Metz
14:00 CET (UTC+1)	Diallo 16', 71'; Gueye 55'	Report	Krasso 28'	Stadium: Stade Saint-Symphorien; Attendance: 19,526; Referee: Mikaël Lesage

25 January 2025 20	Paris FC	4–1	Red Star	Paris
14:00 CET (UTC+1)	Gory 8', 48', 78'; Doucet 90+2'	Report	Badji 85'	Stadium: Stade Charléty; Attendance: 17,748; Referee: Olivier Thual

1 February 2025 21	Guingamp	0–1	Paris FC	Guingamp
20:00 CET (UTC+1)			Mbow 36'	Stadium: Stade de Roudourou; Attendance: 9,128; Referee: Geoffrey Kubler

7 February 2025 22	Paris FC	3–1	Pau	Paris
20:00 CET (UTC+1)	López 28'; Krasso 49'; Cafaro 75'	Report	Mboup 9'	Stadium: Stade Sébastien Charléty; Attendance: 6,023; Referee: Aurélien Petit

15 February 2025 23	Dunkerque	1–0	Paris FC	Dunkirk
14:00 CET (UTC+1)	Tejan 83'	Report		Stadium: Stade Marcel-Tribut; Attendance: 4,764; Referee: Pierre Gaillouste

21 February 2025 24	Paris FC	1–0	Troyes	Paris
20:00 CET (UTC+1)	Lopez 81'	Report		Stadium: Stade Sébastien Charléty; Attendance: 8,813; Referee: Mickaël Leleu

28 February 2025 25	Annecy	2–3	Paris FC	Annecy
20:00 CET (UTC+1)	Larose 19'; Ganiou 61'	Report	Krasso 10'; Kebbal 57'; Camara 62'	Stadium: Parc des Sports; Attendance: 9,132; Referee: Pierre Legat

8 March 2025 26	Paris FC	3–2	Lorient	Paris
14:00 CET (UTC+1)	Cafaro 12'; Krasso 35', 38'; Kebbal (yellow card) 22'; Chergui (yellow card) 25'; Cafaro (yellow card) 31'; Lopez (yellow card) 75'	Report	Soumano 25' (pen.); Kroupi 71' (pen.); Silva (yellow card) 61'; Pagis (yellow card) 93'	Stadium: Stade Sébastien Charléty; Attendance: 17,635; Referee: Olivier Thual

15 March 2025 27	Laval	3–0	Paris FC	Laval
20:00 CET (UTC+1)	Tchokounté 18', 55'; Sellouki 53'; Camara (yellow card) 92'	Report	Camara (yellow card) 11'; Lopez (yellow card) 51'	Stadium: Stade Francis Le Basser; Attendance: 6,449; Referee: Faouzi Benchabane

31 March 2025 28	Paris FC	4–2	Caen	Paris
20:45 CEST (UTC+2)	Kolodziejczak 13'; Krasso 32', 60' (yellow card) 74'; Cafaro 44'	Report	Kyeremeh 82'; Tourraine (OG) 90+1'; Henry (yellow card) 27'; Moucketou-Moussounda (yellow card) 48' Lebreton (yellow card) 54'	Stadium: Stade Sébastien Charléty; Attendance: 9,227; Referee: Eddy Rosier

4 April 2025 29	Paris FC	2–0	Clermont	Paris
20:00 CEST (UTC+2)	Cafaro 8'; Mbow 51' (yellow card) 81'	Report	Da Silva (yellow card) 50' (yellow-red card) 66'; Salmier (yellow card) 66'	Stadium: Stade Sébastien Charléty; Attendance: 10,078; Referee: Guillaume Paradis

12 April 2025 30	Grenoble	1–2	Paris FC	Grenoble
20:00 CEST (UTC+2)	Xantippe 67'	Report	Chergui 13'; Hamel 77'; Camara (yellow card) 58'; De Smet (yellow card) 64'; Lopez (yellow card) 65'; Gory (yellow card) 68'	Stadium: Stade des Alpes; Attendance: 8,166; Referee: Karim Abed

19 April 2025 31	Paris FC	1–0	Bastia	Paris
20:00 CEST (UTC+2)	Hamel 20'; Lopez (yellow card) 60'; Gory (yellow card) 61'	Report	Vincent (yellow card) 60'; Boutrah (yellow card) 68'; Placide (yellow card) 83'; Akueson (red card) 87'; Guidi (yellow card) 95'	Stadium: Stade Sébastien Charléty; Attendance: 14,017; Referee: Florent Batta

26 April 2025 32	Rodez	1–1	Paris FC	Rodez
20:00 CEST (UTC+2)	Bentayeb 78'; Diaw (yellow card) 41'; Baldé (yellow card) 54'; Younoussa (yellow card) 65'	Report	Marchetti 36'; Lopez (yellow card) 76' (yellow-red card) 93'; Doucet (yellow card) 83'	Stadium: Stade Paul-Lignon; Attendance: 4,777; Referee: Pierre Gaillouste

2 May 2025 33	Martigues	1–1	Paris FC	Martigues
20:00 CEST (UTC+2)	Orinel 59'; Saintini (yellow card) 34'; Solvet (yellow card) 92'	Report	Hamel 49'; De Smet (yellow card) 38'	Stadium: Stade Francis-Turcan; Attendance: 6,468; Referee: Aurélien Petit

10 May 2025 34	Paris FC	2–0	Ajaccio	Paris
17:00 CEST (UTC+2)	Krasso 47', 66'	Report	Everson Jr (yellow card) 54'	Stadium: Stade Sébastien Charléty; Attendance: 18,219; Referee: Ruddy Buquet

=== Coupe de France ===
15 November 2024 Seventh round	Paris FC	1–1 (2–4 p)	Quevilly-Rouen	Paris
20:00 CET	Dicko 29'	Report	Dali Amar 17'	Stadium: Stade Sébastien Charléty; Referee: Pierre Gaillouste
