= Luca Koleosho =

Footballer (born 2004)

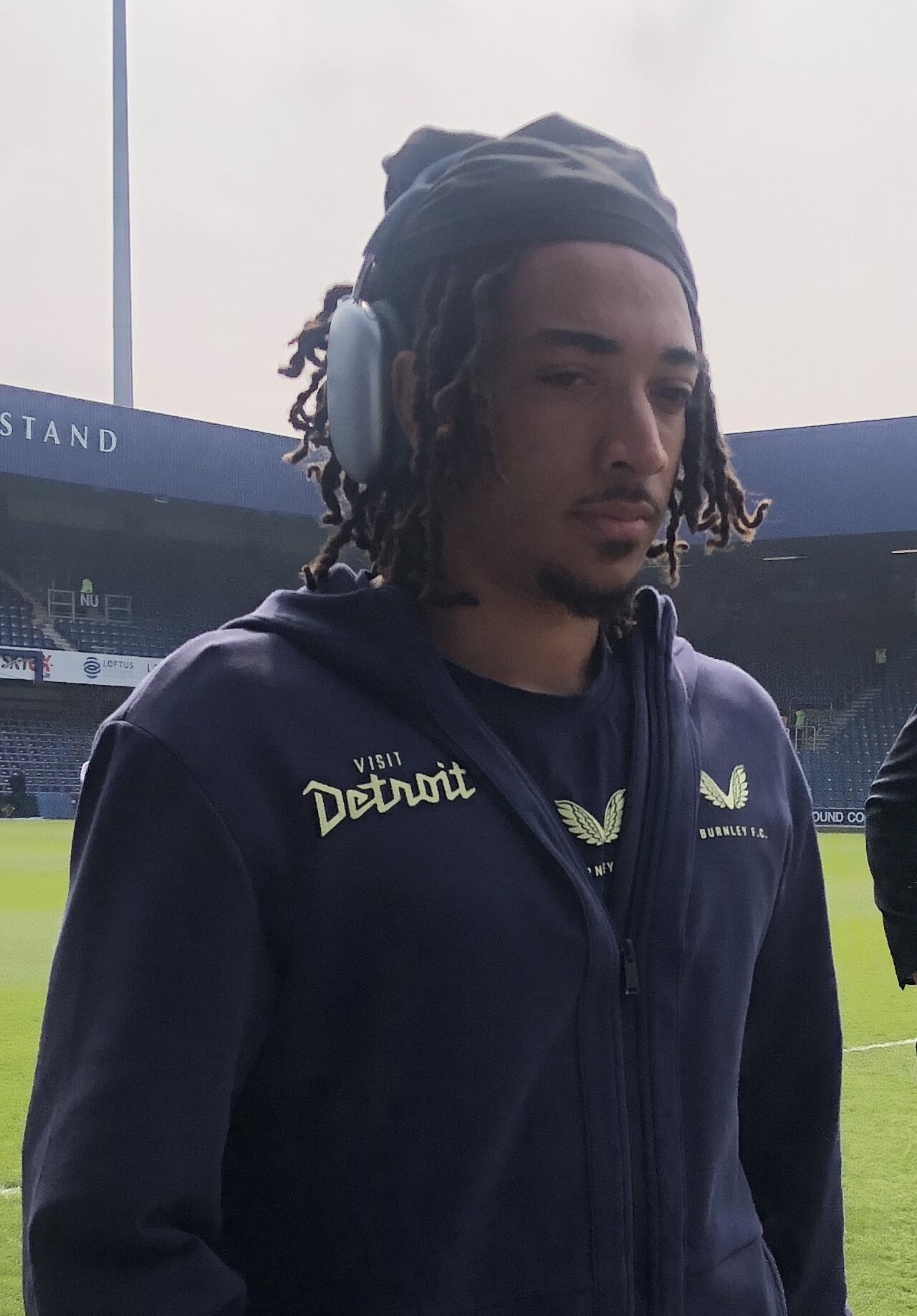
- Koleosho with Burnley in 2025

Personal information
- Full name: Luca Warrick Daeovie Koleosho
- Date of birth: 15 September 2004 (age 22)
- Place of birth: Norwalk, Connecticut, U.S.
- Height: 1.75 m (5 ft 9 in)
- Positions: Winger; wide midfielder

Team information
- Current team: Paris FC
- Number: 15

Youth career
- 2011–2012: Trumbull United
- 2012–2016: Manhattan Kickers
- 2016–2020: Reus
- 2020–2022: Espanyol

Senior career*
| Years | Team | Apps | (Gls) |
| 2022–2023 | Espanyol B | 14 | (2) |
| 2022–2023 | Espanyol | 5 | (1) |
| 2023–2026 | Burnley | 43 | (3) |
| 2025–2026 | → Espanyol (loan) | 3 | (0) |
| 2026 | → Paris FC (loan) | 16 | (3) |
| 2026– | Paris FC | 7 | (1) |

International career^{‡}
| 2019 | United States U15 | 4 | (0) |
| 2023 | Italy U19 | 7 | (0) |
| 2023 | Italy U20 | 2 | (0) |
| 2023– | Italy U21 | 16 | (5) |
| 2026– | Italy | 3 | (0) |
Medal record
Men's football
Representing Italy
UEFA European Under-19 Championship
| Winner | 2023 Malta |
- * Club domestic league appearances and goals as of 25 October 2026 ‡ National team caps and goals as of 15 November 2026

Luca Warrick Daeovie Koleosho (born 15 September 2004) is a professional footballer who plays as a winger or wide midfielder for Ligue 1 club Paris FC. Born in the United States, he plays for the Italy national team.

== Early life ==
Born and raised in the United States to a Nigerian father and an Italian-Canadian mother, Koleosho began playing with his local soccer club Trumbull United at the age of seven. Afterwards, he played for the Manhattan Kickers from age seven to 11. After two trips to Spain with the Kickers, his parents decided to help him develop in Spain. In 2016, he joined the youth academy of Reus, before moving to the Espanyol youth system in 2020. Working his way up their youth sides, he signed his first professional contract with Espanyol on June 2, 2021, keeping him at the club for three additional seasons. In 2022, he helped the Espanyol U19 reach the Copa del Rey Juvenil final, where they were defeated by Real Madrid.

== Club career ==
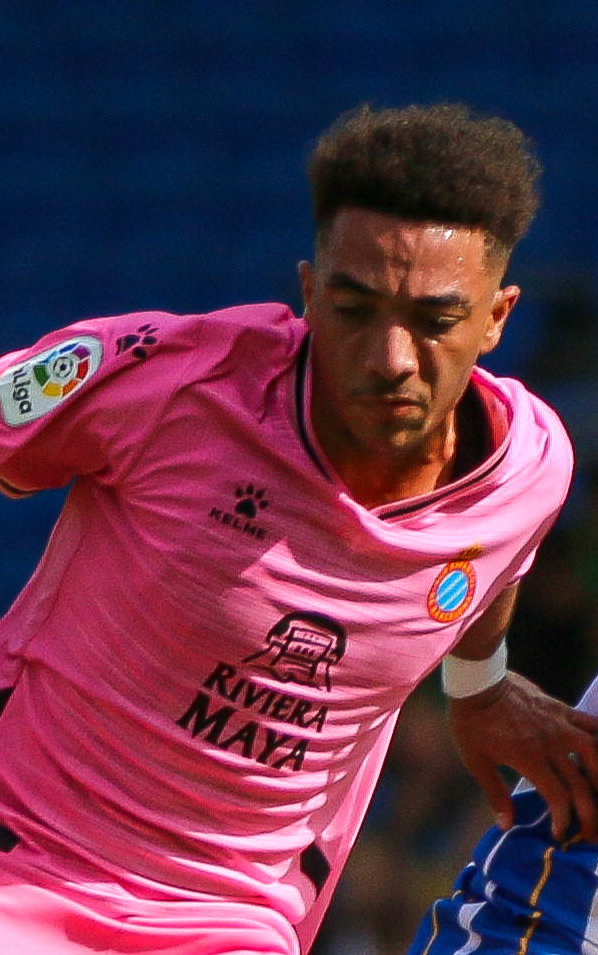
Luca Koleosho playing for Espanyol in 2022.

=== Espanyol ===
He debuted at the senior level with Espanyol B in the fourth tier Segunda División RFEF during the 2021–22 season. He made his first start on October 8, 2022, and scored his first goal against Mallorca B.

He made his first team debut with Espanyol in a 0–0 La Liga tie with Granada on May 22, 2022, coming as a late substitute in the 90th minute. Koleosho scored his first goal for the senior side in Espanyol's final match of the 2022–23 La Liga season against Almería, netting the third goal for his club in a 3–3 draw on June 4, 2023.

=== Burnley ===
On July 25, 2023, Koleosho joined Premier League side Burnley for a transfer fee of £2.6m, plus £860,000 in add-ons, signing a four-year deal with the club. He made his debut for the Clarets on August 11, starting in a 3–0 league defeat to Manchester City. On December 2, he scored his first Premier League goal in a 5–0 victory over Sheffield United.

==== Loan to Espanyol ====
On 21 August 2025, it was announced that Koleosho would return to La Liga club Espanyol on a season long loan.

=== Paris FC ===
On 9 January 2026, Koleosho left Espanyol and joined Ligue 1 side Paris FC on loan until the end of the season with an option to buy. On 18 January 2026, he made his debut for Paris, scoring the winning goal in a 2–1 league victory over Nantes.

On 29 July 2026, Paris FC made the transfer permanent and signed a five-season contract with Koleosho.

== International career ==
Koleosho is eligible to represent the United States, Canada, Nigeria, and Italy, as he was born and raised in the United States to a Nigerian father and an Italian-Canadian mother.

=== United States ===
In August 2019, Koleosho appeared with the United States U15 team, making four appearances. In April 2022, Koleosho was called up to a United States under-20 training camp in Carson, California. After his call-up to Canada's senior side in June 2022, Koleosho confirmed he had not closed the door on representing the United States.

=== Canada ===
Koleosho was called up to the Canada senior national team for a friendly and two CONCACAF Nations League matches in June 2022. He departed the camp after the cancellation of the Iran friendly and the subsequent cancellation of the replacement Panama friendly. In September 2022, Koleosho was re-called to Canada ahead of friendlies against Qatar and Uruguay. In May 2023, Koleosho was listed on the Canada preliminary rosters for the 2023 CONCACAF Nations League Finals.

=== Italy ===
In March 2023, Koleosho accepted a call-up to the Italy under-19 national team, joining a training camp in preparation to the Elite round of the qualifications to the 2023 UEFA European Under-19 Championship. He was subsequently included in the 20-man squad that took part in the aforementioned round. He debuted with them as a late substitute in a 0–0 friendly tie with Slovenia U19 on March 25.

In June 2023, he was included in the Italian squad for the UEFA European Under-19 Championship in Malta, where the Azzurrini eventually won their second continental title.

On 21 November 2023, he made his debut for the Italian under-21 national team in a 2025 UEFA European Under-21 Championship qualifying match against the Republic of Ireland.

In May 2026, Koleosho was one of the players who were called up with the Italy national senior squad by interim head coach Silvio Baldini, for the friendly matches against Luxembourg and Greece on 3 and 7 June 2026, respectively.

On 3 June 2026, he made his debut for the Italy national senior squad in a friendly match against Luxembourg.

== Career statistics ==
=== Club ===
As of match played 17 May 2026

Appearances and goals by club, season and competition
| Club | Season | League | | | National cup (Note: Includes Copa del Rey, FA Cup, Coupe de France) | | League cup | | Total | |
| Club | Season | Division | Apps | Goals | Apps | Goals | Apps | Goals | Apps | Goals |
|---|---|---|---|---|---|---|---|---|---|---|
| Espanyol | 2021–22 | La Liga | 1 | 0 | 0 | 0 | — | | 1 | 0 |
| Espanyol | 2022–23 | La Liga | 4 | 1 | 1 | 0 | — | | 5 | 1 |
| Espanyol | Total | | 5 | 1 | 1 | 0 | — | | 6 | 1 |
| Burnley | 2023–24 | Premier League | 15 | 1 | 0 | 0 | 0 | 0 | 15 | 1 |
| Burnley | 2024–25 | Championship | 28 | 2 | 2 | 0 | 0 | 0 | 30 | 2 |
| Burnley | Total | | 43 | 3 | 2 | 0 | 0 | 0 | 45 | 3 |
| Espanyol (loan) | 2025–26 | La Liga | 3 | 0 | 2 | 0 | — | | 5 | 0 |
| Paris FC (loan) | 2025–26 | Ligue 1 | 16 | 3 | 2 | 0 | — | | 18 | 3 |
| Career total | | | 67 | 7 | 7 | 0 | 0 | 0 | 74 | 7 |

=== International ===
As of match played 15 November 2026

Appearances and goals by national team and year
| National team | Year | Apps | Goals |
|---|---|---|---|
| Italy | 2026 | 3 | 0 |
| Total | | 3 | 0 |

== Honours ==
Italy U19

- UEFA European Under-19 Championship: 2023
