= Dimitri Colau =

French footballer (born 2006)

Personal information
- Full name: Dimitri Dylan Guy Colau
- Date of birth: 23 February 2006 (age 20)
- Place of birth: Paris, France
- Height: 1.83 m (6 ft 0 in)
- Position: Defender

Team information
- Current team: West Ham United
- Number: 37

Youth career
- 2018–2019: US Saint-Denis
- 2019–2023: Paris FC

Senior career*
Years	Team	Apps	(Gls)
2023–	Paris FC B	1	(0)
2023–2025	Paris FC	2	(0)
2025–	West Ham United	0	(0)

International career^{‡}
2021	France U16	3	(0)
- * Club domestic league appearances and goals as of 05:19, 2 September 2025 (UTC) ‡ National team caps and goals as of 10 May 2025

Dimitri Dylan Guy Colau (born 23 February 2006) is a French professional footballer who plays as a defender for Premier League club West Ham United.

== Club career ==
Born in Paris, and growing up in Orly, Colau is a youth product of US Saint-Denis and Paris FC.

Colau made his professional debut with Paris FC in a 3–0 Ligue 2 win over US Concarneau on 26 August 2023.

On 1 September 2025, Colau joined Premier League club West Ham United signing a four–year contract.

== International career ==
Born in metropolitan France, Colau also has Guadeloupean origins. He is a youth international for France, having played for the under-16.
