= Adama Camara =

Malian footballer (born 1996)

Personal information
- Full name: Adama Mohamed Camara
- Date of birth: 18 October 1996 (age 30)
- Place of birth: Bondy, France
- Height: 1.80 m (5 ft 11 in)
- Position: Right back

Team information
- Current team: Paris FC
- Number: 17

Youth career
- Neuilly-sur-Marne
- Gournay-sur-Marne
- USM Gagny

Senior career*
Years	Team	Apps	(Gls)
2015–2018	FC Montfermeil		
2018	Georgia Revolution FC		
2018–2019	FC Montfermeil		
2019–2020	Noisy-le-Grand FC	15	(3)
2020–2023	Racing Club de France	59	(14)
2023–	Paris FC	100	(6)

International career^{‡}
2026–	Mali	1	(0)
- * Club domestic league appearances and goals as of 19 September 2026 ‡ National team caps and goals as of 25 September 2026

Adama Mohamed Camara (born 18 October 1996) is a professional footballer who plays as a right back for club Paris FC. Born in France, he represents the Mali national team.

== Career ==
Camara began playing football in his hometown of Neuilly-sur-Marne, before playing successively for Gournay-sur-Marne, USM Gagny, and FC Montfermeil. In 2018, he moved to the United States to join Georgia Revolution FC in the National Premier Soccer League; however, he would only stay there for three months, returning to Montfermeil. In 2019, Camara joined newly promoted Championnat National 3 club Noisy-le-Grand FC, having previously played at highest in the seventh-tier Régional 2. In 2020, with Noisy-le-Grand suffering relegation, Camara joined fellow National 3 club Racing Club de France after the club's assistant coach demonstrated an interest in signing him.

On 9 June 2023, at the age of 26, Camara signed for Ligue 2 club Paris FC on a contract until June 2025, his first professional contract. He made his debut in a 2–0 defeat to Pau on 19 August 2023.

== Personal life ==
Born in France, Camara is of Malian descent.

Until the age of 25, Camara worked jobs outside of football to make a living. He worked successively at Pizza Hut, as a mailman for Montfermeil, as a bus driver in Seine-et-Marne, and as a delivery driver for the Seine-Saint-Denis departmental council.

== Career statistics ==
=== Club ===
As of match played 19 September 2026

Appearances and goals by club, season, and competition
Club	Season	League			Cup		Other		Total	
Club	Season	Division	Apps	Goals	Apps	Goals	Apps	Goals	Apps	Goals
Noisy-le-Grand FC	2019–20	CFA 2	15	3	0 (Note: Statistics are incomplete for the Coupe de France.)	0	—		15	3
Racing Club de France	2020–21	CFA 2	6	2	0	0	—		6	2
Racing Club de France	2021–22	CFA 2	24	7	0	0	—		24	7
Racing Club de France	2022–23	CFA	29	5	0	0	—		29	5
Racing Club de France	Total		59	14	0	0	—		59	14
Paris FC	2023–24	Ligue 2	35	2	4	0	1 (Note: Appearance in the Ligue 2 promotion play-offs)	0	40	2
Paris FC	2024–25	Ligue 2	31	3	1	0	—		32	3
Paris FC	2025–26	Ligue 1	29	1	3	0	—		32	1
Paris FC	2026–27	Ligue 1	5	0	0	0	—		5	0
Paris FC	Total		100	6	8	0	1	0	109	6
Career total			174	23	8	0	1	0	183	23

=== International ===
As of match played 25 September 2026

Appearances and goals by national team and year
National team	Year	Apps	Goals
Mali	2026	1	0
Total		1	0

== Honours ==
Racing Club de France

- Championnat National 3: 2021–22
