= Pierre Lees-Melou =

French footballer (born 1993)

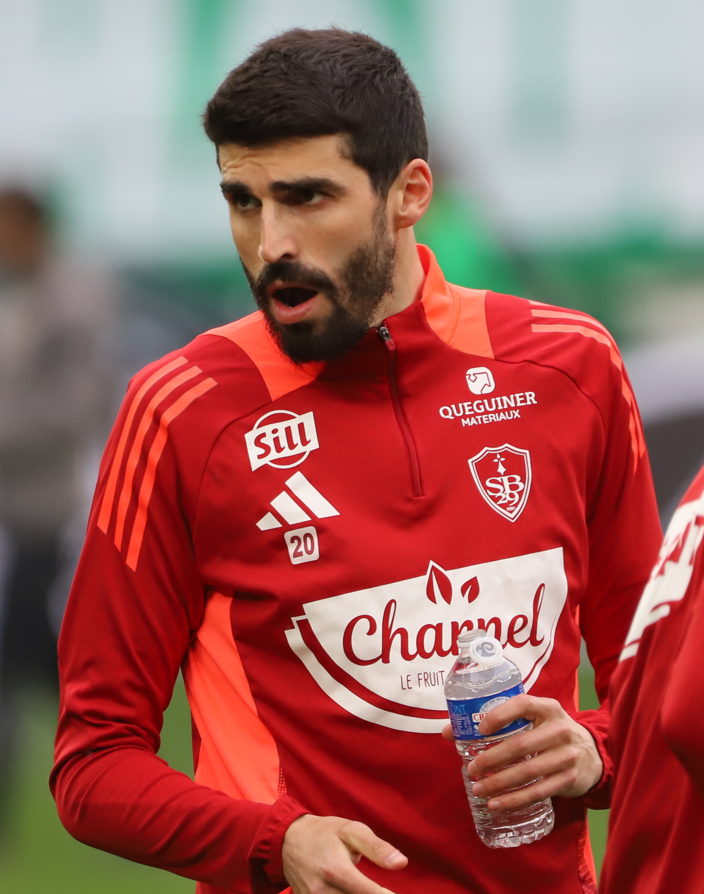
- Lees-Melou with Brest in 2025

Personal information
- Full name: Pierre Lees-Melou
- Date of birth: 25 May 1993 (age 33)
- Place of birth: Langon, Gironde, France
- Height: 1.85 m (6 ft 1 in)
- Position: Midfielder

Team information
- Current team: Paris FC
- Number: 33

Youth career
- 1998–2003: Pierre Monsoise
- 2003–2009: Bordeaux
- 2009–2010: Langon

Senior career*
Years	Team	Apps	(Gls)
2010–2012	Langon	2	(0)
2012	Mérignac-Arlac		
2013–2015	Lège-Cap-Ferret	50	(13)
2015–2017	Dijon	48	(9)
2017–2021	Nice	119	(16)
2021–2022	Norwich City	33	(1)
2022–2025	Brest	83	(11)
2025–	Paris FC	22	(1)
- * Club domestic league appearances and goals as of 19 May 2026

Pierre Lees-Melou (born 25 May 1993) is a French professional footballer who plays as a midfielder and captains Ligue 1 club Paris FC.

== Career ==
=== Dijon ===
Born in Langon, Gironde, Lees-Melou started his career with Lège-Cap-Ferret in the Championnat de France Amateur 2 before sealing a move to Dijon in 2015. He played 16 games (split equally between starts and substitute appearances) as they earned promotion from Ligue 2 in his first season, while also playing in the fifth division with the reserve team. He scored his first two professional goals in April in wins over Clermont and Paris FC, and assisted the opening goal against Ajaccio that earned promotion on the final day.

In the 2016–17 Ligue 1, Lees-Melou scored 7 goals in 32 games as the team survived in 16th place. On 27 August, he came off the bench to score the final goal of a 4–2 comeback win at home to Lyon.

=== Nice ===
In June 2017, Lees-Melou signed a four-year deal with Nice, worth around €5 million. He made his debut on 26 July, starting in the third qualifying round of the UEFA Champions League, a 1–1 home draw with Ajax. After being eliminated in the play-offs by Napoli, the team competed in the UEFA Europa League, and he played all but one game in a run to the last 32.

In September 2020, having played over 100 games for Nice, Lees-Melou's contract was extended for one year. His four season-stay ended with 140 games and 18 goals.

=== Norwich City ===
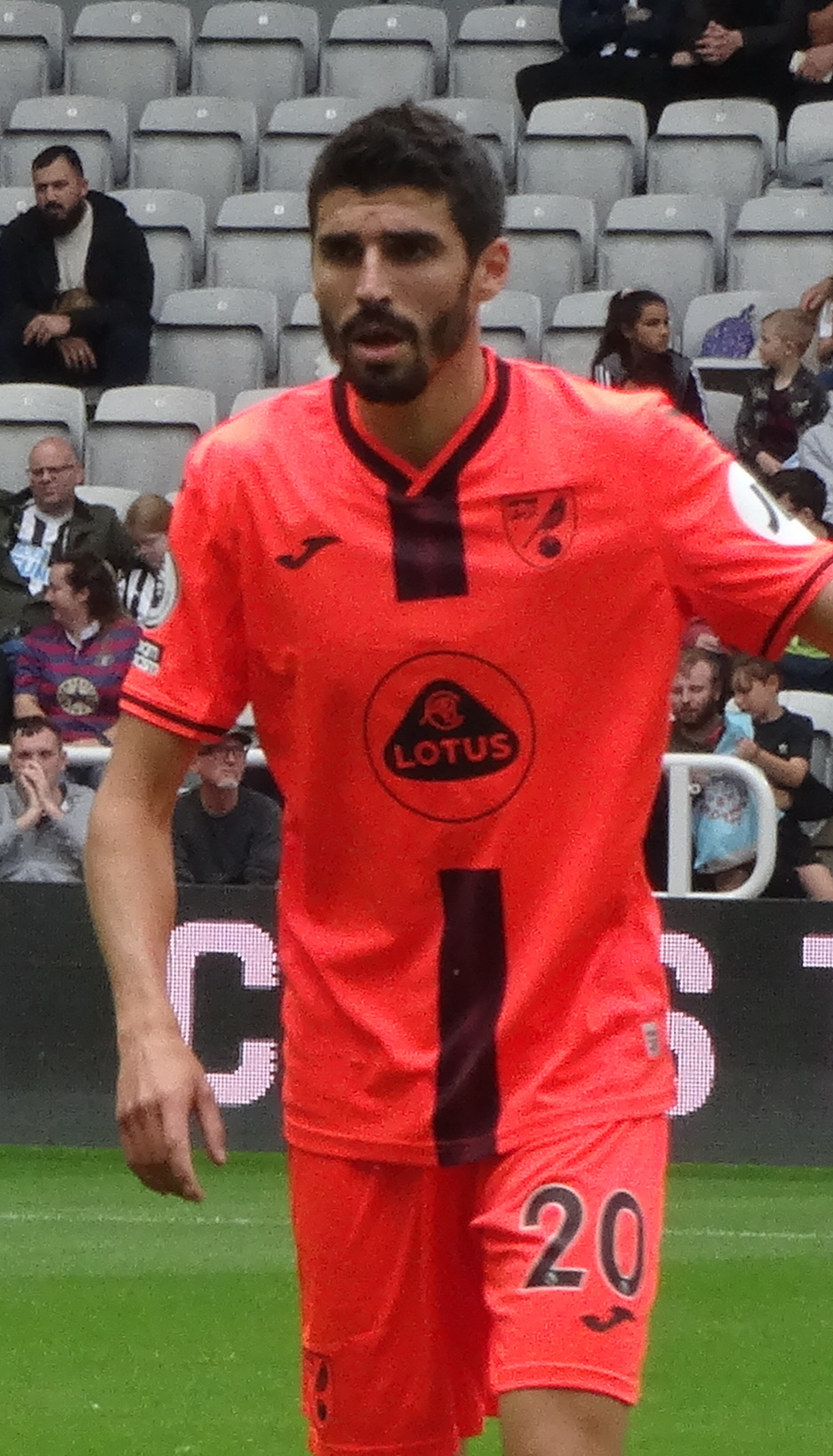
Lees-Melou playing for Norwich City on 2021

On 13 July 2021, Lees-Melou signed a three-year deal with Norwich City for a fee of under £6 million, ahead of the team's return to the Premier League. He scored his first goal the following 10 April, opening a 2–0 home win over relegation rivals Burnley; after the game, striker Teemu Pukki said that he would be crucial for the rest of the season.

=== Brest ===
On 23 July 2022, Lees-Melou signed for Ligue 1 side Brest on a three-year contract with an option for a further year. Norwich City received a reported €2.3 million transfer fee and a 10% sell-on clause. In November 2023, he extended his contract with Brest until June 2027.

In February 2024, he was named Ligue 1 Player of the Month. He was eventually named in the Team of the Year for the 2023–24 season, producing the highest number of possessions won in over 269 occasions. By the end of that season, Brest secured a third-place finish in the league and first ever qualification to the UEFA Champions League.

=== Paris FC ===
On 28 August 2025, Lees-Melou signed with newly promoted Ligue 1 side Paris FC on a two-year deal.

== Career statistics ==
As of match played 17 May 2026

Appearances and goals by club, season and competition
Club	Season	League			National cup (Note: Includes Coupe de France, FA Cup)		League cup (Note: Includes Coupe de la Ligue, EFL Cup)		Europe		Total	
Club	Season	Division	Apps	Goals	Apps	Goals	Apps	Goals	Apps	Goals	Apps	Goals
Lège-Cap-Ferret	2013–14	CFA 2	24	3	0	0	—		—		24	3
Lège-Cap-Ferret	2014–15	CFA 2	26	10	0	0	—		—		26	10
Lège-Cap-Ferret	Total		50	13	0	0	—		—		50	13
Dijon B	2015–16	CFA 2	7	2	—		—		—		7	2
Dijon	2015–16	Ligue 2	16	2	1	0	1	0	—		18	2
Dijon	2016–17	Ligue 1	32	7	1	0	1	0	—		34	7
Dijon	Total		48	9	2	0	2	0	—		52	9
Nice	2017–18	Ligue 1	34	5	0	0	2	0	11 (Note: Four appearances in UEFA Champions League, seven appearances in UEFA Europa League)	0	47	5
Nice	2018–19	Ligue 1	30	2	0	0	1	0	—		31	2
Nice	2019–20	Ligue 1	26	5	2	0	1	1	—		29	6
Nice	2020–21	Ligue 1	29	4	2	1	—		2 (Note: Appearances in UEFA Europa League)	0	33	5
Nice	Total		119	16	4	1	4	1	13	0	140	18
Norwich City	2021–22	Premier League	33	1	3	0	1	0	—		37	1
Brest	2022–23	Ligue 1	32	5	2	1	—		—		34	6
Brest	2023–24	Ligue 1	29	4	2	0	—		—		31	4
Brest	2024–25	Ligue 1	20	2	3	0	—		5 (Note: Appearance in UEFA Champions League)	1	28	3
Brest	2025–26	Ligue 1	2	0	0	0	—		—		2	0
Brest	Total		83	11	7	1	—		5	1	95	13
Paris FC	2025–26	Ligue 1	22	1	0	0	—		—		22	1
Career total			362	53	16	2	7	1	18	1	403	57

== Honours ==
Individual

- UNFP Ligue 1 Team of the Year: 2023–24
- UNFP Ligue 1 Player of the Month: February 2024
- The Athletic Ligue 1 Team of the Season: 2023–24
