= Timothée Kolodziejczak =

French footballer (born 1991)

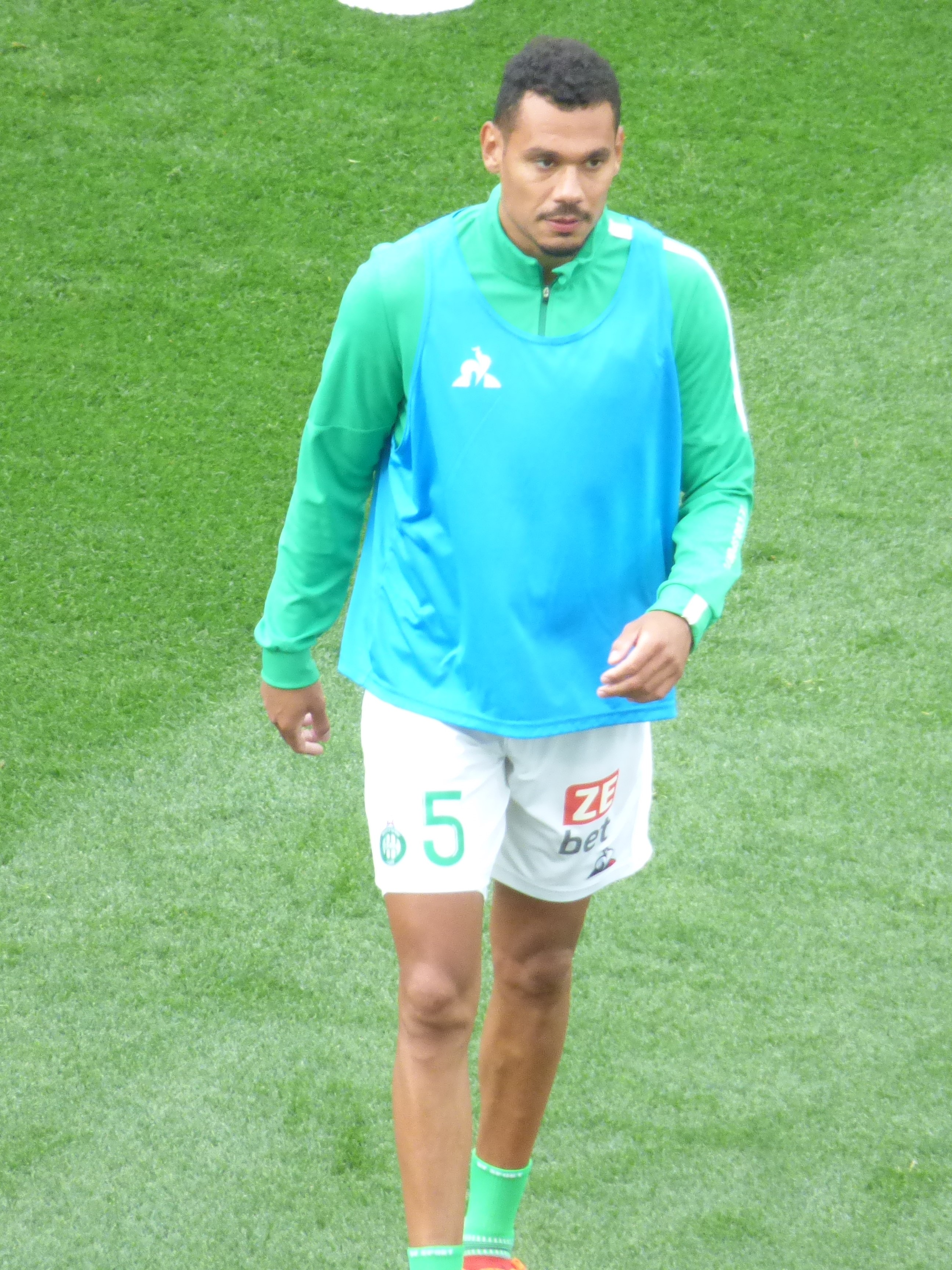
- Kolodziejczak with Saint-Étienne in 2020

Personal information
- Full name: Timothée Christian Kolodziejczak
- Date of birth: 1 October 1991 (age 35)
- Place of birth: Arras, France
- Height: 1.83 m (6 ft 0 in)
- Position: Defender

Youth career
- 1999: Saint-Maurice Loos
- 1999–2000: Avion
- 2000–2008: Lens

Senior career*
| Years | Team | Apps | (Gls) |
| 2008–2009 | Lens | 0 | (0) |
| 2008–2009 | → Lyon (loan) | 1 | (0) |
| 2009–2012 | Lyon | 11 | (0) |
| 2010–2012 | Lyon B | 23 | (4) |
| 2012–2014 | Nice | 71 | (2) |
| 2014–2017 | Sevilla | 52 | (1) |
| 2017 | Borussia Mönchengladbach | 1 | (0) |
| 2017–2020 | Tigres UANL | 6 | (0) |
| 2018–2020 | → Saint-Étienne (loan) | 51 | (3) |
| 2020 | → Saint-Étienne B (loan) | 1 | (0) |
| 2020–2022 | Saint-Étienne | 54 | (2) |
| 2022–2023 | Schalke 04 | 1 | (0) |
| 2023–2026 | Paris FC | 53 | (3) |

International career
| 2007 | France U16 | 1 | (0) |
| 2007–2008 | France U17 | 15 | (1) |
| 2008–2009 | France U18 | 6 | (0) |
| 2009–2010 | France U19 | 14 | (2) |
| 2010–2012 | France U20 | 18 | (4) |
Medal record
Men's football
Representing France
UEFA European Under-17 Championship
| Runner-up | 2008 Turkey |
- * Club domestic league appearances and goals as of 19 May 2026

Timothée Christian Kolodziejczak (French pronunciation: [timɔte kolodʒezak]; (Polish pronunciation: [kɔ.wɔˈd͡ʑɛj.t͡ʂak]; born 1 October 1991) is a French professional footballer who plays as a defender. He can play as either a centre or left-back.

Kolodziejczak is a French youth international and has competed at all levels. He played on the under-19 team that won the 2010 UEFA European Under-19 Football Championship. Due to the difficulty of pronouncing his surname, he is a commonly referred to as Kolo.

== Early life ==
Kolodziejczak was born on 1 October 1991 in Arras, France, to a Polish father and a Martiniquais mother.

== Club career ==
=== Early career ===
Kolodziejczak began his career at the age of seven playing for local club US Saint-Maurice Loos-en-Gohelle. In July 1999, he moved to hometown club Avion where he spent a year. In June 2000, Kolodziejczak joined the professional club of Lens. While in the club's youth academy, he trained alongside youth and international teammate Gaël Kakuta at the Centre de Préformation de Football in nearby Liévin, a training center exclusively for players brought up in the Nord-Pas-de-Calais region. He spent two years at the center training there during the weekdays and playing with Lens on the weekends. One of his trainers at the facility was former Polish international Joachim Marx.

After graduating from the club's youth academy, he was offered a five-year professional contract as Lens were attempting to tie down the defender who was being scouted by several prominent European clubs, most notably Manchester United. Kolodziejczak turned down the offer with hopes of signing elsewhere stating he had no confidence in the club. Following negotiations, it was announced on 21 August 2008 that Kolodziejczak agreed to join seven-time Ligue 1 champions Lyon on a season-long loan with a view to a permanent deal with Lens demanding at least €3 million in compensation for the player.

=== Lyon ===
Upon his arrival to the club, Kolodziejczak was given the number 12 shirt on the first-team. However, due to signing late in the transfer window, he missed Lyon's entire pre-season campaign and was placed on the club's Championnat de France Amateur team in the fourth division by manager Claude Puel. He made his reserve debut on 13 September 2008 in the derby match against Saint-Étienne's reserve team. The match resulted in a 2–1 victory with Kolodziejczak playing the entire match picking up a yellow card. Two months later, Kolodziejczak was called up to the first team for a league match against Paris Saint-Germain (PSG) on 23 November 2008 to serve as the backup left back. In the match, he made his professional debut coming on as a substitute for the severely injured Anthony Réveillère in the 11th minute. Lyon lost the match 1–0 with Kolodziejczak being penalized with a yellow card late in the second half. Following the season, Lyon signed Kolodziejczak on a permanent deal with the player agreeing to a four-year deal and the transfer fee being priced at €2.5 million.

For the 2009–10 season, Kolodziejczak's playing time was limited. On 29 September 2009, he made his UEFA Champions League debut in the team's 4–0 victory over Hungarian club Debrecen appearing as a substitute for starting left back Aly Cissokho. Four days later, Kolodziejczak made another substitute appearance in a 2–0 win against his former club Lens. On 21 November, he made his first professional start playing 76 minutes in a 1–1 draw against Grenoble.

=== Nice ===
In the summer of 2012, Kolodziejczak moved to fellow Ligue 1 club Nice on a four-year contract.

=== Sevilla ===
Kolodziejczak joined Sevilla on 27 August 2014, signing a three-year contract on a transfer fee of €3 million. On 18 September he made his first appearance, as the club defeated Feyenoord 2–0 in the UEFA Europa League. He debuted in La Liga six days later, playing the entirety of a 1–0 home win against Real Sociedad. On 2 October, he was shown a straight red card in a Europa League match at HNK Rijeka for conceding a penalty on Andrej Kramarić. This was converted for the first equaliser in an eventual 2–2 draw.

He scored his first goal on 29 October, opening a 6–1 win at CE Sabadell in the first leg of the Copa del Rey round of 32. He made nine appearances as they won the Europa League in his first season, including the 3–2 win over Dnipro Dnipropetrovsk in the final in Warsaw.

=== Borussia Mönchengladbach ===
On 4 January 2017, Kolodziejczak signed for German club Borussia Mönchengladbach.

=== Tigres UANL ===
On 4 September 2017, Kolodziejczak joined Liga MX club Tigres UANL.

=== Saint-Étienne ===
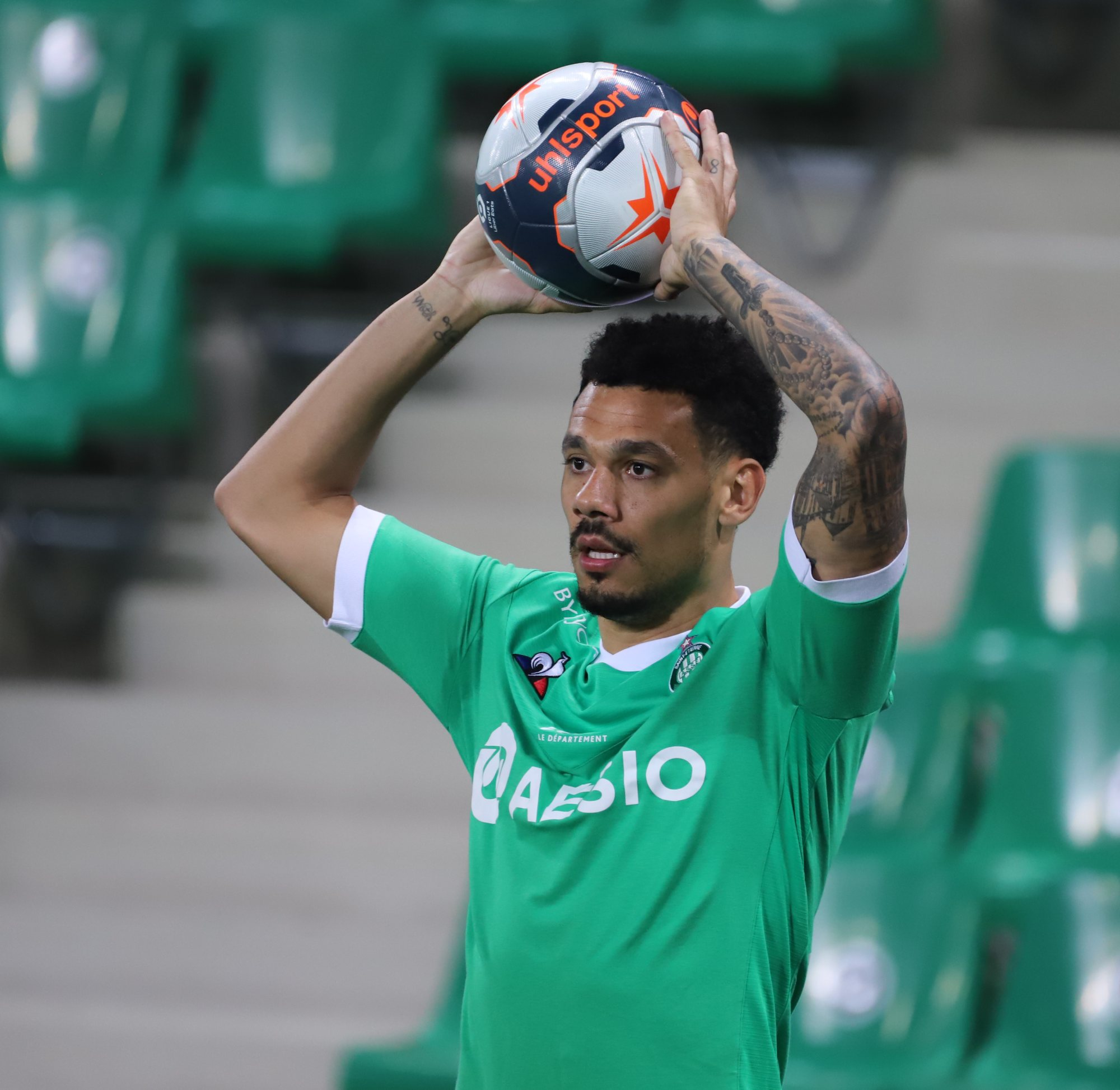
Kolodziejczak in 2021

In August 2018, Kolodziejczak joined Ligue 1 club Saint-Étienne on loan with an option to buy. On 22 August 2019, Kolodziejczak was loaned again at Saint-Étienne for another season. Saint-Étienne exercised their option to purchase Kolodziejczak in the summer of 2020 for €4.5 million.

=== Schalke 04 ===
On 21 October 2022, Kolodziejczak signed for Schalke 04 on a contract until the end of the season.

=== Paris FC ===
On 2 September 2023, Kolodziejczak signed for Paris FC.

== International career ==
Kolodziejczak has featured for all of France's national youth teams beginning with the under-16 team. He made his debut with the team in the team's last match against Germany at the Olympic Stadium in Berlin on 30 May 2006. Germany won the match 1–0 with Felix Kroos scoring the lone goal. With the under-17 team, Kolodziejczak was a regular and made his debut in the team's opening match against Switzerland in a 4–0 victory. In qualification for the 2008 UEFA European Under-17 Football Championship, he appeared in both rounds of qualification with the team finishing the Elite Round portion unbeaten, which led to qualification to the UEFA-sanctioned tournament. At the tournament, Kolodziejczak scored his first youth international goal against Turkey in the semi-finals. The goal came in the 69th minute with France trailing 1–0. The team later won the match 4–3 on penalties. In the final, France were defeated 4–0 by Spain.

Kolodziejczak made his debut in France national under-18 football team's opening match against Ukraine. He only made six appearances with the team. With the under-19 team, Kolodziejczak was again called upon by coach Francis Smerecki making his first appearance with the team on 9 October 2009 in 4–2 defeat to the Netherlands. After consistently appearing with the team for the campaign, on 7 June 2010, he was named to Smerecki's 18-man squad to participate in the 2010 UEFA European Under-19 Football Championship. Kolodziejczak played in all five of the team's matches including the final match against Spain, which France won 2–1. The title is the country's second UEFA Under-19 championship.

Following France's victory at the UEFA Under-19 championship, the nation qualified for the 2011 FIFA U-20 World Cup, which merited under-20 team appearances for Kolodziejczak. He made his debut with the team on 7 October 2010 in a friendly match against Portugal, which ended 3–3. Kolodziejczak, subsequently, appeared in four matches for the team during the 2010–11 campaign and, on 10 June 2011, was named to the 21-man squad to participate in the U-20 World Cup. He made his debut in the competition on 30 July 2011 in the team's 4–1 defeat to the hosts Colombia.

Kolodziejczak is also eligible to represent Poland at international level through his father. At the age of 15, he was issued a proposal by the Polish Football Association (PZPN) who sought for him to play for the country's youth international teams. However, due to not having Polish citizenship, Kolodziejczak would have been unable to play in an official match for Poland, which led to his father rejecting the opportunity, and instead deciding that it would be better to wait a few years until coming to a decision.

== Career statistics ==
As of match played 26 April 2025.

Appearances and goals by club, season and competition
| Club | Season | League | | | National cup | | Continental | | Other | | Total | |
| Club | Season | Division | Apps | Goals | Apps | Goals | Apps | Goals | Apps | Goals | Apps | Goals |
|---|---|---|---|---|---|---|---|---|---|---|---|---|
| Lyon (loan) | 2008–09 | Ligue 1 | 1 | 0 | 0 | 0 | 0 | 0 | 0 | 0 | 1 | 0 |
| Lyon | 2009–10 | Ligue 1 | 2 | 0 | 0 | 0 | 1 (Note: Appearances in the UEFA Champions League) | 0 | 0 | 0 | 3 | 0 |
| Lyon | 2010–11 | Ligue 1 | 8 | 0 | 0 | 0 | 1 | 0 | 0 | 0 | 9 | 0 |
| Lyon | 2011–12 | Ligue 1 | 1 | 0 | 0 | 0 | 0 | 0 | 0 | 0 | 1 | 0 |
| Lyon | Total | | 11 | 0 | 0 | 0 | 2 | 0 | 0 | 0 | 14 | 0 |
| Lyon B | 2010–11 | CFA | 12 | 3 | — | | — | | — | | 12 | 3 |
| Lyon B | 2011–12 | CFA | 11 | 1 | — | | — | | — | | 11 | 1 |
| Lyon B | Total | | 23 | 4 | — | | — | | — | | 23 | 4 |
| Nice | 2012–13 | Ligue 1 | 37 | 0 | 2 | 0 | — | | 2 (Note: Appearance(s) in the Coupe de la Ligue) | 1 | 41 | 1 |
| Nice | 2013–14 | Ligue 1 | 34 | 2 | 3 | 0 | 2 (Note: Appearances in the UEFA Europa League) | 0 | 2 | 1 | 41 | 3 |
| Nice | Total | | 71 | 2 | 5 | 0 | 2 | 0 | 4 | 2 | 82 | 4 |
| Sevilla | 2014–15 | La Liga | 18 | 1 | 5 | 1 | 9 | 0 | — | | 32 | 2 |
| Sevilla | 2015–16 | La Liga | 29 | 0 | 8 | 0 | 13 (Note: Six appearances in the Champions League; seven appearances and a goal in the Europa League) | 1 | — | | 50 | 1 |
| Sevilla | 2016–17 | La Liga | 5 | 0 | 2 | 0 | 2 (Note: One appearance in the UEFA Super Cup and one in the Champions League) | 0 | 0 | 0 | 9 | 0 |
| Sevilla | Total | | 52 | 1 | 15 | 1 | 24 | 1 | 0 | 0 | 91 | 3 |
| Borussia Mönchengladbach | 2016–17 | Bundesliga | 1 | 0 | 0 | 0 | 1 | 0 | — | | 2 | 0 |
| Tigres UANL | 2017–18 | Liga MX | 6 | 0 | 1 | 0 | 1 (Note: Appearance in the CONCACAF Champions League) | 0 | 0 | 0 | 8 | 0 |
| Saint-Étienne (loan) | 2018–19 | Ligue 1 | 36 | 3 | 2 | 0 | — | | 0 | 0 | 38 | 3 |
| Saint-Étienne (loan) | 2019–20 | Ligue 1 | 15 | 0 | 4 | 1 | 6 | 1 | 1 | 0 | 26 | 2 |
| Saint-Étienne (loan) | Total | | 51 | 3 | 6 | 1 | 6 | 1 | 1 | 0 | 64 | 5 |
| Saint-Étienne B (loan) | 2019–20 | National 2 | 1 | 0 | — | | — | | — | | 1 | 0 |
| Saint-Étienne | 2020–21 | Ligue 1 | 24 | 0 | 1 | 0 | — | | — | | 25 | 0 |
| Saint-Étienne | 2021–22 | Ligue 1 | 30 | 2 | 3 | 0 | — | | — | | 33 | 2 |
| Saint-Étienne | Total | | 54 | 2 | 4 | 1 | — | | — | | 122 | 7 |
| Schalke 04 | 2022–23 | Bundesliga | 1 | 0 | 0 | 0 | — | | — | | 1 | 0 |
| Paris FC | 2023–24 | Ligue 2 | 11 | 1 | 1 | 0 | — | | 1 (Note: Appearance in the Ligue 2 promotion play-offs) | 0 | 13 | 1 |
| Paris FC | 2024–25 | Ligue 2 | 30 | 2 | 1 | 0 | — | | 0 | 0 | 31 | 2 |
| Paris FC | Total | | 41 | 3 | 2 | 0 | — | | 1 | 0 | 44 | 3 |
| Career total | | | 316 | 15 | 33 | 2 | 36 | 2 | 6 | 2 | 391 | 21 |

== Honours ==
Sevilla

- UEFA Europa League: 2014–15, 2015–16

UANL

- Liga MX: Apertura 2017

Saint-Étienne

- Coupe de France runner-up: 2019–20

Individual

- UEFA Europa League Squad of the Season: 2014–15
