= Patrick Zabi =

Ivorian footballer (born 2006)

Personal information
- Full name: Eloge Patrick Zabi Gueu
- Date of birth: 24 September 2006 (age 20)
- Place of birth: Yopougon, Ivory Coast
- Height: 1.91 m (6 ft 3 in)
- Position: Midfielder

Team information
- Current team: Paris FC
- Number: 8

Youth career
- Ivoire FC

Senior career*
Years	Team	Apps	(Gls)
2025–2026	Reims B	9	(1)
2025–2026	Reims	30	(1)
2026–	Paris FC	0	(0)

International career^{‡}
2026–	Ivory Coast U23	5	(1)
2026–	Ivory Coast	2	(0)
- * Club domestic league appearances and goals as of 11 May 2026 ‡ National team caps and goals as of 3 October 2026

Eloge Patrick Zabi Gueu (born 24 September 2006), also known as Zabi La Magie, is an Ivorian professional footballer who plays as a midfielder for Ligue 1 club Paris FC and the Ivory Coast national team.

== Club career ==
A youth product of the Ivorian club Ivoire FC and well-known 6-a-side footballer in the Ivory Coast, Zabi signed with Reims on 7 January 2025, and was assigned to their reserves. He made his senior and professional debut for Reims as a substitute in a 2–1 Ligue 1 loss to Nantes on 2 February 2025.

On 5 February 2026, it was announced that Zabi would sign for Paris FC for a €25 million fee in the summer.

== International career ==
On 29 September 2026, Zabi made his debut for the Ivory Coast national team in an AFCON qualifier against Somalia.

== Honours ==
Reims

- Coupe de France runner-up: 2024–25
