= Rudy Matondo =

French footballer (born 2008)

Personal information
- Full name: Rudy Nzingoula Matondo
- Date of birth: 13 March 2008 (age 18)
- Place of birth: Évry-Courcouronnes, France
- Height: 1.80 m (5 ft 11 in)
- Position: Midfielder

Team information
- Current team: Paris FC
- Number: 23

Youth career
- 2017–2023: US Grigny
- 2023–2025: Auxerre

Senior career*
Years	Team	Apps	(Gls)
2025	Auxerre B	5	(0)
2025–2026	Auxerre	21	(0)
2026–	Paris FC	11	(2)

International career^{‡}
2024	France U16	3	(0)
2024–2025	France U17	14	(3)
2025–	France U18	3	(0)
2026–	France U19	3	(0)
Medal record
Men's football
Representing France
UEFA European Under-17 Championship
Runner-up	2025 Albania
- * Club domestic league appearances and goals as of 19 May 2026 ‡ National team caps and goals as of 31 March 2026

Rudy Nzingoula Matondo (born 13 March 2008) is a French professional footballer who plays as a midfielder for Ligue 1 club Paris FC.

== Club career ==
Matondo joined the youth academy of Auxerre in 2023 from US Grigny. In the 2024–25 season, he was the youngest member of the club's under-19 squad competing in the UEFA Youth League. On 6 April 2025, Matondo made his professional debut as a substitute in a 1–0 Ligue 1 victory over Rennes. It was reported later in the same month that league rivals Marseille were expressing interest in signing him over the summer.

On 23 June 2025, Matondo signed his first professional contract with Auxerre for a term of three years.

On 2 February 2026, Matondo moved to Paris FC.

== International career ==
Matondo is a youth international for France.

== Personal life ==
Born in France, Matondo is of Congolese descent from the Republic of the Congo. His older brother Rabby Nzingoula is also a professional footballer.

== Honours ==
France U17

- UEFA European Under-17 Championship runner-up: 2025
