= Julián Vignolo =

Argentine footballer (born 2006)

Personal information
- Full name: Julián Ariel Vignolo
- Date of birth: 7 December 2006 (age 19)
- Place of birth: Arroyito, Argentina
- Height: 1.85 m (6 ft 1 in)
- Position: Forward

Team information
- Current team: Toulouse
- Number: 7

Youth career
- 2012–2015: El Tío
- 2015–2018: Cultural
- 2018–2020: Talleres
- 2020–2024: Racing de Córdoba

Senior career*
| Years | Team | Apps | (Gls) |
| 2024–2025 | Racing de Córdoba | 35 | (6) |
| 2025– | Toulouse | 13 | (2) |
- * Club domestic league appearances and goals as of 19 May 2026 ‡ National team caps and goals as of 01:49, 13 May 2025 (UTC)

Julián Ariel Vignolo (born 7 December 2006) is an Argentine professional footballer who plays as a forward for Ligue 1 club Toulouse.

== Club career ==
Vignolo is a product of the youth academies of the Argentine clubs El Tío, Cultural, Talleres, before moving to Racing de Córdoba during the COVID-19 pandemic to finish his development. He debuted in the Primera Nacional, the Argentine second division, in a loss to Agropecuario on 11 February 2024. In May 2025, he extended his contract with Racing until December 2026. In August 2025 he transferred to the French Ligue 1 club Toulouse.
