= Jean-Philippe Krasso =

Ivorian footballer (born 1997)

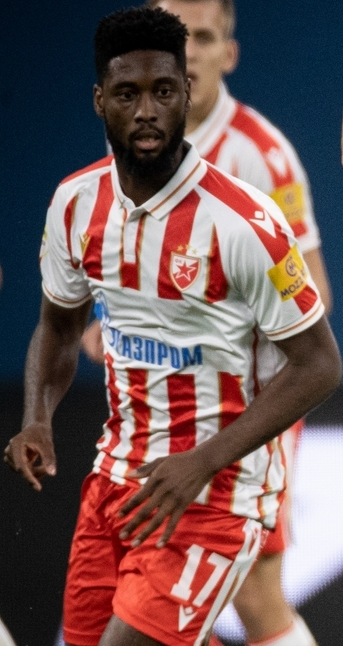
- Krasso with Red Star in 2023

Personal information
- Full name: Jean-Philippe Nils Stephan Krasso
- Date of birth: 17 July 1997 (age 29)
- Place of birth: Stuttgart, Germany
- Height: 1.87 m (6 ft 2 in)
- Position: Forward

Team information
- Current team: Paris FC
- Number: 11

Youth career
- 2007–2012: IFR Châteauroux
- 2012–2015: Lorient

Senior career*
Years	Team	Apps	(Gls)
2015–2017	Lorient B	43	(6)
2017–2018	Schiltigheim	23	(5)
2018–2020	Épinal	42	(10)
2020–2023	Saint-Étienne	57	(18)
2021	→ Le Mans (loan)	14	(5)
2022	→ Ajaccio (loan)	15	(4)
2023–2024	Red Star Belgrade	29	(8)
2024–	Paris FC	66	(19)

International career^{‡}
2017	Ivory Coast U20	5	(2)
2022–	Ivory Coast	27	(9)
Medal record
Representing Ivory Coast
Men's football
Africa Cup of Nations
Winner	2023 Ivory Coast
- * Club domestic league appearances and goals as of 10 May 2026 ‡ National team caps and goals as of 31 December 2025

Jean-Philippe Nils Stephan Krasso (born 17 July 1997) is a professional footballer who plays as a forward for Ligue 1 club Paris FC. Born in Germany, he plays for the Ivory Coast national team.

== Club career ==
=== Early career ===
Krasso moved to France in 2007 from Germany and starting playing football at IFR Châteauroux, before joining the academy of Lorient. He spent his early career with Lorient B, Schiltigheim, and Épinal in the Championnat National 2.

=== Saint-Étienne ===
Krasso signed a three-year professional contract with Saint-Étienne on 28 May 2020. On 24 July 2020, he made his professional debut with Saint-Étienne in a 1–0 loss to Paris Saint-Germain in the 2020 Coupe de France Final. On 31 January 2021, he was loaned to Le Mans in the Championnat National, to progress his career. On 27 January 2022, Krasso was loaned to Ligue 2 side Ajaccio, and helped the club achieve promotion to Ligue 1.

On 30 August 2022, Krasso scored four goals in Saint-Étienne's 5–0 home victory over Bastia, becoming the first to score four goals in a league match for the club in the 21st century.

=== Red Star Belgrade ===
On 20 June 2023, Krasso joined reigning Serbian SuperLiga champions Red Star Belgrade on a free transfer. He scored two goals on his debut on 30 July, a 5–0 home win over Vojvodina.

=== Paris FC ===
On 6 July 2024, Krasso joined Ligue 2 club, Paris FC. On 17 August 2024, Krasso made debut against Stade Malherbe Caen and win 0–2 at away games in Matchweek 1.

== International career ==
Krasso was born in Germany and is of Ivorian descent; He moved to France at a young age. He represented the Ivory Coast U20s at the 2017 Toulon Tournament.

Krasso made his senior international debut for Ivory Coast in their 2–1 friendly win over Togo on 25 September 2022.

Krasso was part of the victorious Ivory Coast side at the 2023 Africa Cup of Nations, where he scored one goal in the group stage win over Guinea-Bissau.

Krasso was included in the list of Ivorian players selected by coach Emerse Faé to participate in the 2025 Africa Cup of Nations.

== Career statistics ==
=== Club ===
As of match played 2 May 2025.

Appearances and goals by club, season and competition
Club	Season	League			National cup (Note: Includes Coupe de France, Serbian Cup)		Europe		Total	
Club	Season	Division	Apps	Goals	Apps	Goals	Apps	Goals	Apps	Goals
Saint-Étienne	2019–20	Ligue 1	0	0	1	0	–		0	0
Saint-Étienne	2020–21	Ligue 1	6	0	0	0	–		6	0
Saint-Étienne	2021–22	Ligue 1	16	1	2	0	–		18	1
Saint-Étienne	2022–23	Ligue 2	35	17	0	0	–		35	17
Saint-Étienne	Total		57	18	3	0	–		60	18
Le Mans (loan)	2020–21	Championnat National	14	5	–		–		14	5
Ajaccio (loan)	2021–22	Ligue 2	15	4	–		–		15	4
Red Star Belgrade	2023–24	Serbian SuperLiga	29	8	3	1	4 (Note: Appearances in UEFA Champions League)	0	36	9
Paris FC	2024–25	Ligue 2	30	15	0	0	–		30	15
Career total			145	50	6	1	4	0	155	51

=== International ===
As of 31 December 2025

Appearances and goals by national team and year
National team	Year	Apps	Goals
Ivory Coast	2022	4	1
Ivory Coast	2023	5	2
Ivory Coast	2024	14	4
Ivory Coast	2025	4	2
Total		27	9

Scores and results list Ivory Coast's goal tally first, score column indicates score after each Krasso goal.

List of international goals scored by Jean-Philippe Krasso
No.	Date	Venue	Opponent	Score	Result	Competition
1	16 November 2022	Stade de Marrakech, Marrakesh, Morocco	Burundi	1–0	4–0	Friendly
2	24 March 2023	Stade de la Paix, Bouaké, Ivory Coast	Comoros	3–0	3–1	2023 Africa Cup of Nations qualification
3	17 November 2023	Alassane Ouattara Stadium, Abidjan, Ivory Coast	Seychelles	7–0	9–0	2026 FIFA World Cup qualification
4	13 January 2024	Alassane Ouattara Stadium, Abidjan, Ivory Coast	Guinea-Bissau	2–0	2–0	2023 Africa Cup of Nations qualification
5	6 September 2024	Stade de la Paix, Bouaké, Ivory Coast	Zambia	1–0	2–0	2025 Africa Cup of Nations qualification
6	6 September 2024	Stade de la Paix, Bouaké, Ivory Coast	Zambia	2–0	2–0	2025 Africa Cup of Nations qualification
7	10 September 2024	Ahmadou Ahidjo Stadium, Yaoundé, Cameroon	Chad	1–0	2–0	2025 Africa Cup of Nations qualification
8	18 November 2025	Al-Seeb Stadium, Seeb, Oman	Oman	2–0	2–0	Friendly
9	31 December 2025	Marrakesh Stadium, Marrakesh, Morocco	Gabon	1–2	3–2	2025 Africa Cup of Nations

== Honours ==
Saint-Étienne

- Coupe de France runner-up: 2019–20

Red Star Belgrade

- Serbian SuperLiga: 2023–24
- Serbian Cup: 2023–24

Ivory Coast

- Africa Cup of Nations: 2023

Individual

- UNFP Ligue 2 Team of the Year: 2022–23, 2024–25
- Serbian SuperLiga Player of the Week: 2023–24 (Round 1), (Round 2)
