= Omar Sissoko =

French footballer (born 2006)

Personal information
- Date of birth: 18 August 2006 (age 20)
- Place of birth: Poissy, France
- Height: 1.75 m (5 ft 9 in)
- Position: Forward

Team information
- Current team: Paris FC
- Number: 18

Youth career
- 2014–2022: Créteil
- 2022–2023: Paris FC

Senior career*
Years	Team	Apps	(Gls)
2023	Paris FC B	5	(0)
2023–	Paris FC	13	(1)
2025–2026	→ Pau (loan)	19	(4)

International career
2024	France U19	3	(2)
- * Club domestic league appearances and goals as of 11 May 2026

Omar Sissoko (born 18 August 2006) is a French professional footballer who plays as a forward for Ligue 1 club Paris FC.

== Club career ==
A youth product of Créteil, on 14 June 2022 Sissoko signed with the academy of Paris FC. On 6 June 2023, he signed a trainee contract with Paris FC until 2026. He made his senior and professional debut with Paris FC in a 2–0 Ligue 2 loss to Pau FC on 19 August 2023. On 24 August 2024, he signed a professional contract until 2027.

On 19 August 2025, Sissoko was loaned to Pau in Ligue 2. He made his Pau FC debut on 25 August 2025 against Stade de Reims, scoring a goal.

Sissoko became, at 19 years and 7 days, the youngest goalscorer in the club's history in Ligue 2.

== International career ==
Born in France, Sissoko is of Malian descent. He is a youth international for France, having played for the France U19s for a set of friendlies in September 2024.

== Personal life ==
Sissoko appeared in the French film Quatre Zéros, released in 2024 and directed by Fabien Onteniente. He was recommended to the role by the former professional footballer and part-owner of Paris FC Raí, who noticed his performance in the 2023 Tournoi Européen U21 de Ploufragan, where he was named the best player.
