= Paris FC =

Association football club in France

- Full name: Paris Football Club
- Nicknames: Les Parisiens (The Parisians); Les Bleus (The Blues)
- Short name: Paris FC; PFC; Paris
- Founded: 1 August 1969; 57 years ago
- Stadium: Stade Jean-Bouin
- Capacity: 20,000
- Coordinates: 48°50′35″N 2°15′10″E
- Owners: Agache Sport (52.4%); Alter Paris (29.8%); Red Bull GmbH (10.6%); BRI Sports Holdings (7.2%)
- President: Antoine Arnault
- Head coach: Liam Rosenior
- League: Ligue 1
- 2025–26: Ligue 1, 11th of 18
- Website: ParisFC.fr
Home colours	Away colours	Third colours

Paris Football Club (French pronunciation: [paʁi futbol klœb]), commonly referred to as Paris FC, PFC or Paris, are a French professional football club based in Paris, France, which competes in Ligue 1, the top division of French football.

Founded in 1969, the club merged with Stade Saint-Germain to form Paris Saint-Germain (PSG) in 1970, but it spun off in 1972. They are nicknamed Les Bleus (The Blues) for their shirt colour, and their crest features the Eiffel Tower. Since 2025, Paris FC has been playing at the Stade Jean-Bouin, located in the 16th arrondissement of Paris across the street from PSG's Parc des Princes. Unlike their counterpart, they struggled to establish themselves in the ranks of French football, returning to Ligue 1 in 2025.

Since 2024, Paris FC have been majority-owned by the Arnault family's Agache Sport, which currently holds 52.4% of the shares. Alter Paris led by Pierre Ferracci owns 29.8%, Austrian conglomerate Red Bull GmbH owns 10.6%, and BRI Sports Holdings owns 7.2% of the club's shares.

== History ==
=== Foundation and relegation (1969–1973) ===
In 1969, the French Football Federation launched a project to establish a major football club in Paris, led by Fernand Sastre, Henri Patrelle and Guy Crescent. Paris FC was created with the aim of reaching the top division, and in 1970 it merged with Stade Saint-Germain to form Paris Saint-Germain. The partnership was short-lived, however, as disagreements over the club's identity and finances led to the split in 1972. Paris FC retained its place in Division 1, while PSG were relegated to Division 3.

=== Rebuilding and difficult years (1974–2024) ===
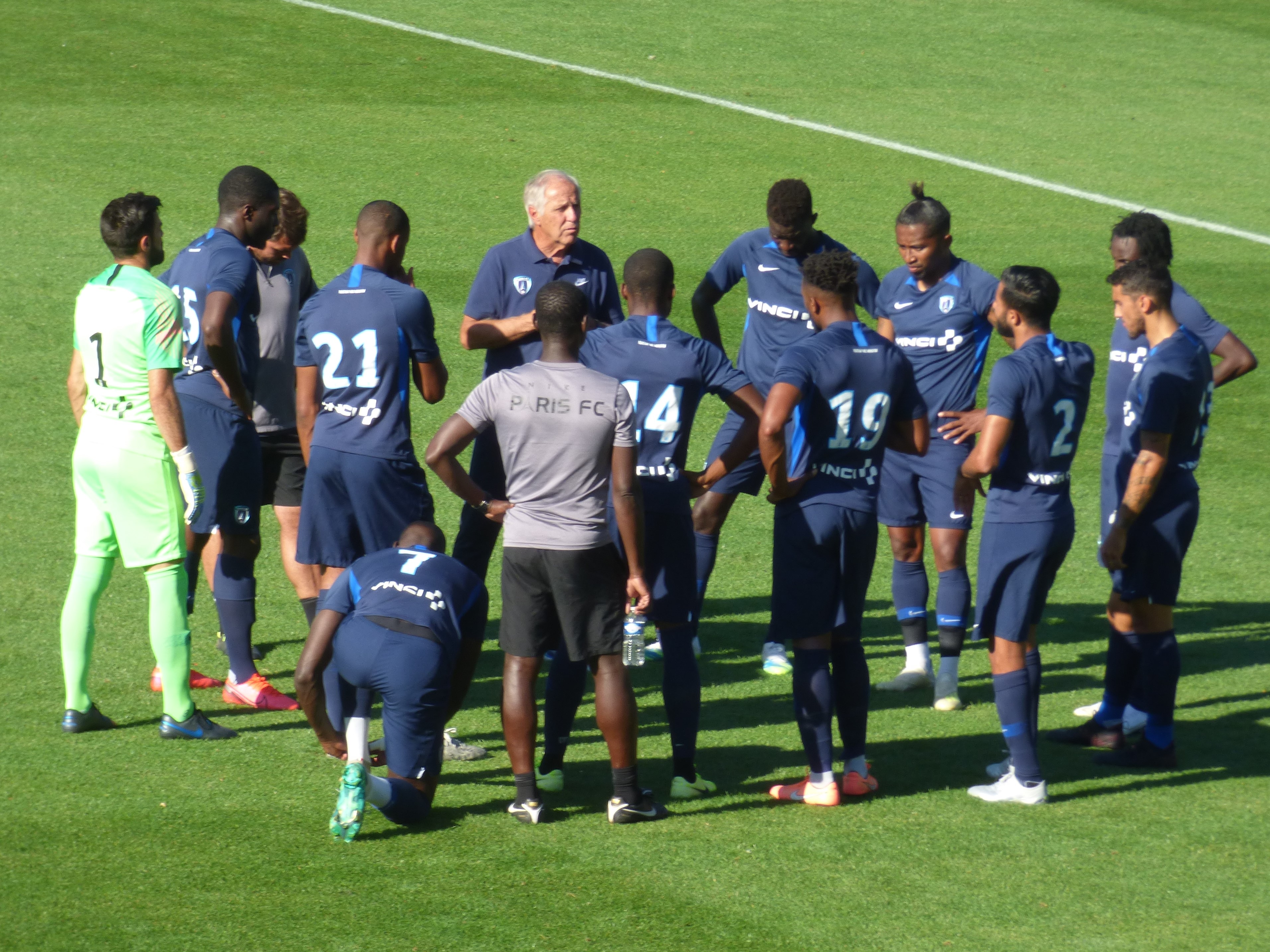
Paris FC squad in the 2015–16 season.

Paris FC struggled to establish itself among France's leading clubs. After PSG returned to the top flight and took over the Parc des Princes in 1974, Paris FC experienced financial problems, several changes of ownership and repeated relegations. The club briefly returned to Division 1 in 1978–79 but were relegated after one season. Further difficulties led to several rebrandings, including Racing Paris 1, Paris FC 98 and Paris FC 2000, before the club returned to the name Paris Football Club in 2005. Under Jean-Marc Pilorget, Paris FC won its Championnat de France Amateur group in 2006 and returned to the Championnat National, moving to the Stade Sébastien Charléty in 2007.

Following its return to the third tier, Paris FC spent several years rebuilding. The club eventually earned promotion to Ligue 2 in 2015, ending a 32-year absence from the second tier, although it was relegated after only one season. Paris FC returned to Ligue 2 in 2017 after SC Bastia's administrative relegation and gradually established itself as a competitive second-tier side.

In July 2020, the Kingdom of Bahrain became a strategic partner and acquired a 20% stake in Paris FC, while Pierre Ferracci remained the majority shareholder. The investment provided greater financial stability as the club continued to pursue promotion to Ligue 1.

=== Arnault Ownership (2024–present) ===
In October 2024, it was reported that the Arnault family would acquire a majority stake in Paris FC alongside a minority investment from Red Bull. The takeover was completed on 29 November, with Agache Sport holding 52.4%, Pierre Ferracci's Alter Paris holding 29.8%, Red Bull 10.6% and BRI 7.2%. Ferracci remained club president, while the new ownership brought greater financial resources and ambitions to the project.

On 2 May 2025, the club secured promotion to Ligue 1 after a 1–1 draw with Martigues, returning to France's top division for the first time since 1979. Paris FC's first Ligue 1 season since 1979 brought a mixture of experienced players and younger talent. Stéphane Gilli was replaced by Antoine Kombouaré during the season, and the club ultimately finished 11th, comfortably avoiding relegation. The campaign ended with a 2–1 home victory over Paris Saint-Germain at Stade Jean-Bouin, while Paris FC had also defeated PSG 1–0 in the Coupe de France earlier in the season to record their first competitive victory over their city rivals. Following the season, Kombouaré left the club by mutual agreement and was replaced by Liam Rosenior in July 2026.

== Identity ==
=== Denomination ===
Chronology of names, mergers and splits

Paris Football Club; 1969–1970	Stade Saint-Germain; 1904–1970
CA Montreuil; 1920–1972	Paris Saint-Germain; 1970–1972
Paris Football Club; 1972–1983	Paris Saint-Germain; 1972–
Racing Paris 1; 1982–1983	Racing Club Paris; 1896–1983
Paris Football Club; 83; 1983–1991	Racing Paris 1 / Matra Racing; 1983–1989
Paris Football Club; 98; 1991–1996
Paris Football Club; 2000; 1996–2005
Paris Football Club; 2005–

The identity of Paris FC has evolved significantly since its creation, shaped by mergers, political influence, and rebranding efforts to reinforce its association with the French capital. Initially formed in 1969 through a French Football Federation (FFF) initiative to establish a major Parisian club, Paris FC merged in 1970 with Stade Saint-Germain to form Paris Saint-Germain (PSG). However, the union was short-lived. In 1972, under pressure from the Paris City Council — which refused to support a club based outside the city and demanded a more Parisian identity — the two entities split.

In the following years, Paris FC undertook several identity changes to strengthen its connection with Paris. During a brief return to the top flight in 1978–79, the club temporarily rebranded as "Paris 1" with backing from Europe 1 radio and the city council. In the early 1980s, the club again changed its name to "Racing Paris 1" after merging with Racing Club de France's first team, a move driven by businessman Jean-Luc Lagardère's ambition to create a dominant Parisian club. The merger left the original Paris FC entity relegated to the amateur divisions under the name "Paris Football Club 83". Further branding efforts followed in the 1990s: in 1991, the club became "Paris FC 98" to align with France's bid to host the 1998 FIFA World Cup, and in 1996, it was renamed "Paris FC 2000", before eventually, in 2005, the club returned to its original name, "Paris Football Club".

=== Colours ===
Paris FC's club colors have evolved significantly since its inception, reflecting its complex history and identity. Initially, following the 1970 merger with Stade Saint-Germain to form Paris Saint-Germain (PSG), the team adopted red and blue to represent Paris and white to symbolize the royal town of Saint-Germain-en-Laye. After the 1972 split from PSG, Paris FC chose orange kits, influenced by their sponsor Bic, marking a period of corporate branding but also a departure from the club's earlier colors, with orange briefly returning for 1979–80 season. During the late 1970s and early 1980s, the club switched to sky blue, a nod to its historical ties with Racing Club de France, whose colors were sky blue. However, during the club's lower-division period, Paris FC moved toward predominantly white kits with sky-blue and navy elements. In the early 2000s, Paris FC moved to dark navy blue, a color that connected to Paris's historical symbolism, notably through the Eiffel Tower and Paris's coat of arms, both of which use similar tones.

1969–72	1972–73; 1979–80	1978–83; 1989–02	1983–89	2002–18

=== Crest evolution ===
The club's first crest was consisted of a blue football featured a minimalist circular design centered around a stylized white nave, a direct reference to the coat of arms of the city of Paris. The nave symbolizes the Nautes, a powerful guild of boatmen and merchants who managed the Parisian municipality during the Middle Ages. The surrounding circle was blue with red and white outlines, subtly echoing the French tricolore, reinforcing the club's identity as deeply Parisian and French.

In the 1990s and 2000s, Paris FC adopted a more ornate and complex crest shaped like a stylized football, the badge incorporated dark blue and black tones. At the top of the crest, a detailed rendering of the Eiffel Tower asserting the club's Parisian identity, while the central nave remained as a consistent symbol of the city's medieval and municipal legacy.

From 2011 onwards, Paris FC introduced a logo is shaped like a navy blue shield with rounded sky blue contours, exuding a professional and polished appearance. A stylized Eiffel Tower dominated the design, rendered in a minimalist and elegant line form, reinforcing the club's deep connection to the city of Paris. At the base of the crest, the nave reappeared once more, with the "Paris FC" written on top.

1969–1990

1990–2011

2011–2024

2024–Present

== Grounds ==
=== Stadiums ===
Since its founding, Paris FC has played in several stadiums, most notably the Parc des Princes, Stade Déjerine, Stade Charléty, and, more recently, the Stade Jean-Bouin. The club played its home games at the newly rebuilt Parc des Princes from 1972 to 1974, and again in 1978–79, during its brief spells in Division 1, sharing the ground with Paris Saint-Germain at the time. Following the club's relegation in 1974, the team moved to the aging Stade de la Porte de Montreuil, later renamed Stade Déjerine, a modest ground with limited capacity. Paris FC remained there for many years, despite suffering from poor facilities and even a fire that destroyed the dressing rooms during the 1974–75 season.

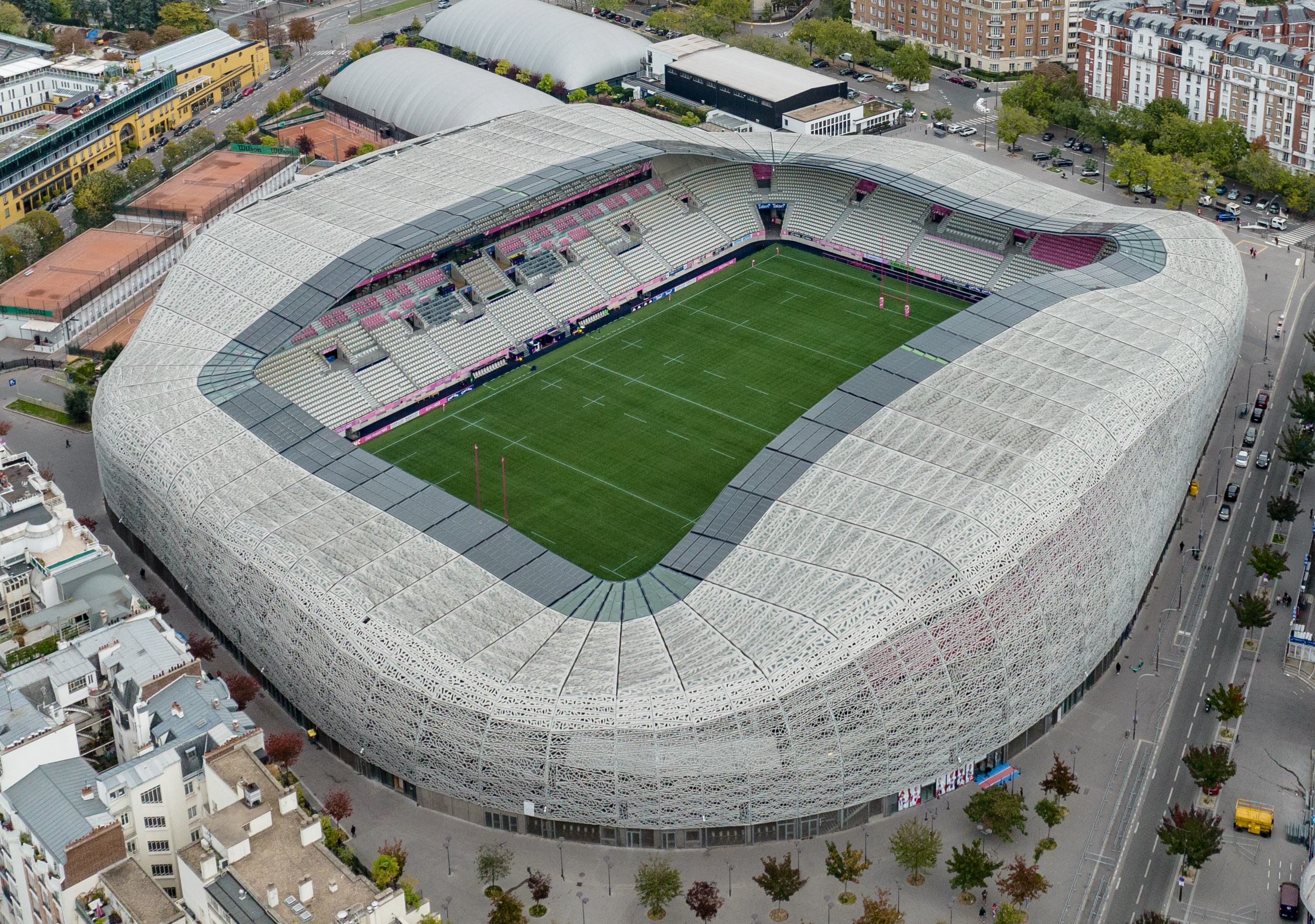
Stade Jean-Bouin in October 2022

In 1999, Paris FC temporarily moved to the Stade Charléty as part of a bid to return to professional football, but after relegation, they returned to Déjerine until 2007. That year, they permanently settled at Stade Charléty, and in 2013, due to low attendance and loosened FFF regulations, the club returned again to Déjerine for a short period.

In February 2025, Paris FC reached a landmark agreement with Stade Français to move into the Stade Jean-Bouin starting in the 2025–26 season. Located in the 16th arrondissement across the street from the Parc des Princes, Jean-Bouin offered a more enclosed and football-friendly environment. The move was strongly supported by Red Bull's Head of Global Soccer Jürgen Klopp, who pushed for the change due to Charléty’s poor matchday experience. Klopp believed the distant seating and track at Charléty diminished both fan engagement and player performance. The move aligned with Red Bull's football vision to build an intense and supportive home atmosphere and elevate Paris FC's competitive stature in French football.

== Supporters ==
Paris FC had a sizeable support base from its earliest years. The project to establish a major professional club in the French capital attracted more than 17,000 prospective members before Paris FC merged with Stade Saint-Germain in 1970 to form Paris Saint-Germain. The two entities separated in 1972, with Paris FC retaining its professional status and place in Division 1. In the 1972–73 season, the club averaged 13,202 spectators at home, including 39,021 against Olympique de Marseille. Its support subsequently declined as Paris FC suffered relegations, financial difficulties and long spells in the lower divisions, while PSG became the dominant club in the capital.

The club's modern organised supporter scene developed from the late 2000s. The Blue Wolves became one of its first notable modern ultra groups but disappeared in 2010 after several incidents involving supporters. The Old Clan was founded the same year and initially included some former Paris Saint-Germain supporters who had stopped attending the Parc des Princes following the restructuring of PSG's supporter sections. Ultras Lutetia, founded in 2014, later became the club's principal ultra group, organising chants, tifos and away support. As Paris FC returned to Ligue 2 and became more competitive, the supporter base increasingly developed an identity independent of PSG.

Paris FC's attendances began rising substantially after the club introduced free admission at Stade Charléty in November 2023, a policy which more than doubled its average crowd and helped attract a new generation of spectators. Interest increased further during the 2024–25 promotion campaign, when the club was acquired by the Arnault family and Red Bull, giving Paris FC greater media exposure and renewed sporting ambitions. By March 2025, average attendance had reached 8,974, with 17,748 attending the derby against Red Star. Promotion to Ligue 1 and the subsequent move to the more compact Stade Jean-Bouin accelerated this growth, with higher-profile opposition, improved matchday atmosphere and increased interest in the club attracting both existing supporters and new football fans. Season-ticket numbers consequently rose from 770 in the club's final Ligue 2 season to around 7,000 for its return to the top flight.

Beyond its local rivalries, Paris FC's supporter scene has also developed friendships with supporters of other clubs. The Old Clan established links with the Colmar supporter group Green Boys, a relationship publicly acknowledged by the Paris group in the mid-2010s. Paris FC supporters also developed a friendship with those of Hereford through a series of reciprocal visits beginning in 2015. After Hereford supporters attended a Paris FC match, four Paris supporters travelled to Edgar Street for Hereford's match against Quorn in October 2015. Six Hereford supporters subsequently travelled to Paris for Paris FC's Ligue 2 match against Sochaux at the Stade Charléty, after which seven Paris FC supporters made the return journey to attend Hereford's match against Alvechurch. Links have also been reported between Paris FC supporters and supporters of Stade de Reims, particularly within the clubs' casual supporter scenes.

== Rivalries ==
=== Paris derby ===
The Paris derby, also referred to as Derby de Paris, Derby de la Capitale, or Le Derby Parisien, is a French football rivalry contested between PFC and PSG, the two largest professional clubs based in Paris, France. Founded in 1969, Paris FC split from PSG in 1972, spent decades in the lower divisions before returning to the top flight in 2025. Meanwhile, PSG, founded in 1970 through the merger of PFC and Stade Saint-Germain grew into the dominant club in both the capital and French football, regularly competing in Ligue 1 and European competitions.

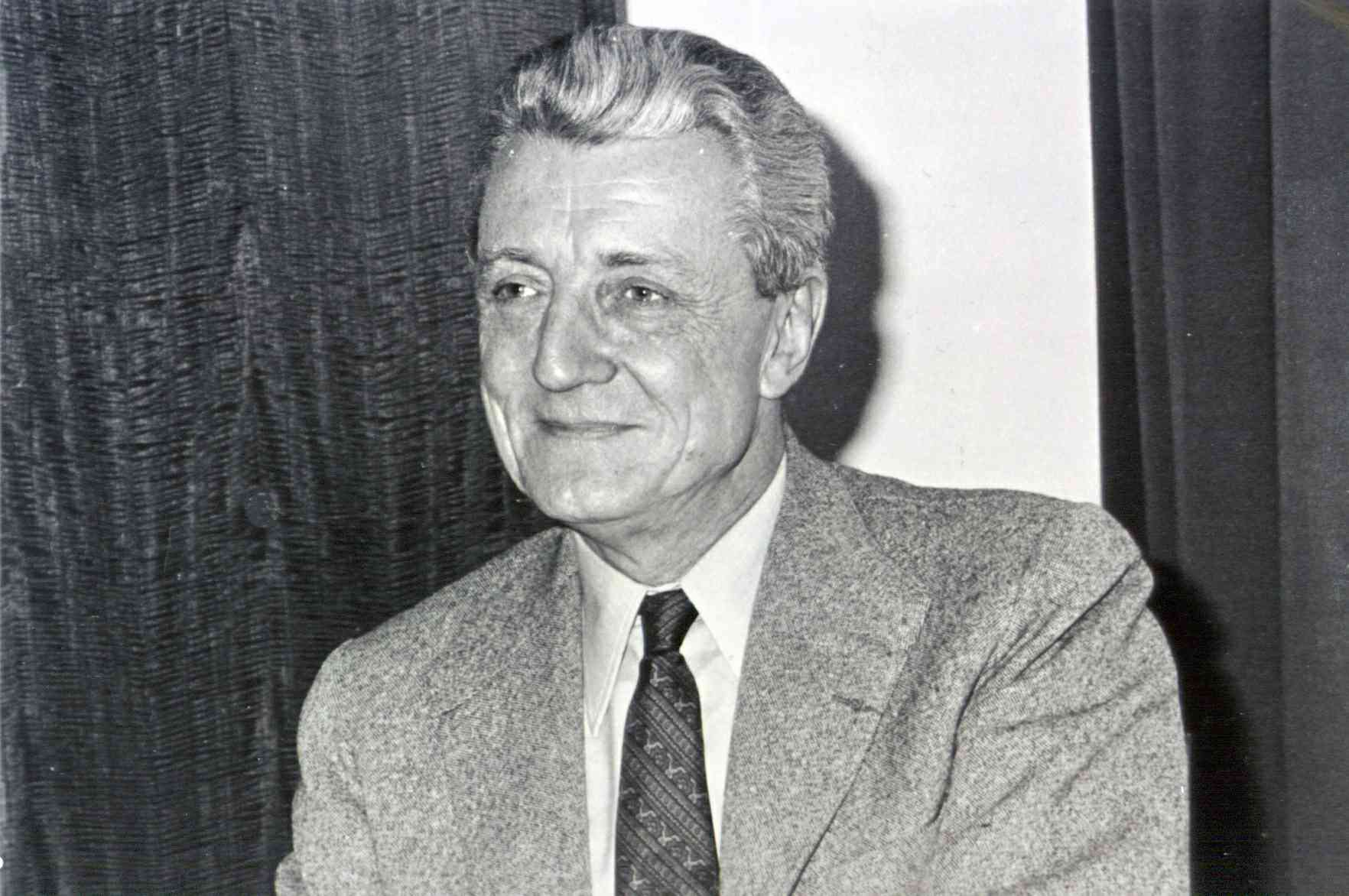
Guy Crescent, founder of PFC and PSG.

The rivalry traces its roots to the early history of football in the French capital, where historic clubs like Racing Club de France and Red Star once competed. Both emerged from efforts by the French Football Federation (FFF) to create a major inner‑city club in the late 1960s. While Paris FC originally remained in Ligue 1 following the 1972 split, PSG quickly established itself as the capital's leading club, taking over the Parc des Princes and embarking on a period of sustained success that left Paris FC absent from the top tier for decades. Consequently, there were no first‑team meetings between the two between 1978 and 2025.

Following Paris FC's promotion to Ligue 1 in 2025, the Paris derby returned. The two clubs' home stadiums—PFC's Stade Jean-Bouin and PSG's Parc des Princes— are separated by only a short distance, creating one of the closest geographic derbies in world football. The first top‑flight meeting since 1990 took place on 4 January 2026 at the Parc des Princes, with PSG winning 2–1 in a closely contested match. A subsequent Coupe de France encounter saw Paris FC secure a 1–0 victory, marking PSG's first home defeat in the competition in several years.

Beyond the men's game, the Paris derby extends to women's football, where Paris FC (women) and Paris Saint-Germain FC (women) also compete at the highest level, adding further depth to the rivalry. Paris FC, formerly known as Juvisy, was the capital's dominant women's club in the 2000s, while PSG largely dominated the Paris derby (women) during the 2010s. In the early 2020s, Paris FC established itself as the third force in the league, highlighted by their victory over PSG in the 2025 Coupe de France Féminine final. Together with PSG, they the only clubs capable of contesting the dominance of OL Lyonnes.

=== Other rivalries ===
The club has rivalries with fellow Île-de-France clubs Créteil and Red Star, with whom they contest regional Parisian derbies. The rivalry with Créteil developed mainly through the clubs' frequent meetings in the Championnat National, particularly between 1993 and 1999 and again from the late 2000s, when both regularly competed for promotion to Ligue 2. The fixture consequently became one of the principal derbies of the southern Paris region, and occasionally produced tensions between the clubs' supporters; incidents were reported around their National meeting at Créteil in May 2010. The rivalry is nevertheless generally regarded as more geographical and sporting than historic, having been strengthened by the clubs repeatedly pursuing similar objectives in the lower divisions.

The rivalry with Red Star is older and generally considered the more prominent of Paris FC's traditional regional rivalries. The clubs first met in Division 1 on 4 October 1972, when Paris FC defeated Red Star 3–0 at the Parc des Princes in front of 15,198 spectators. The rivalry was revived during the 2010s when both clubs regularly competed in the Championnat National and later Ligue 2, with matches often attracting greater interest than other Paris FC fixtures. Tensions between sections of the two supporter bases have also contributed to the intensity of the fixture, most notably during the September 2014 derby at Stade Charléty, when clashes took place near the stadium. The derby retained its importance after both clubs returned to Ligue 2 in 2024–25; Paris FC's 4–1 home victory over Red Star in January 2025 attracted 17,748 spectators, then a record crowd for a Paris FC league match at Charléty.

== Honours ==
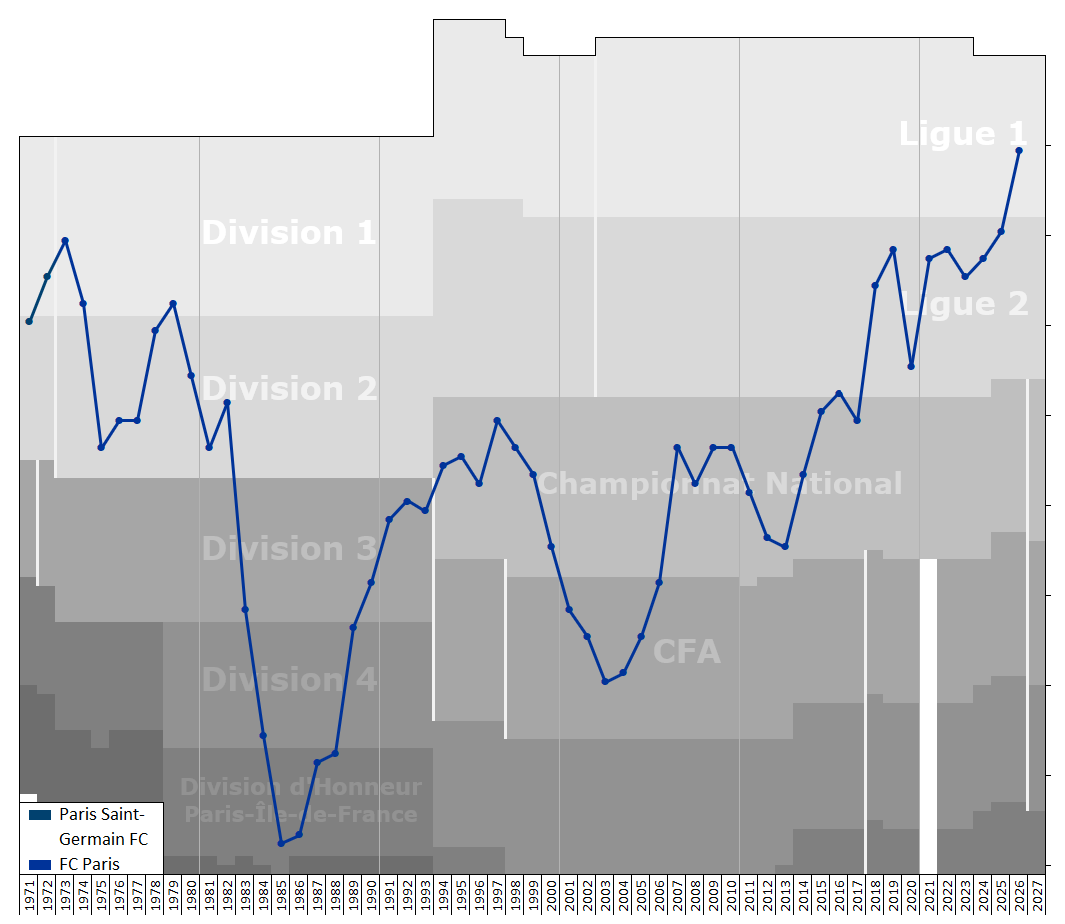
Historical league performance chart of Paris FC

=== League ===
- Ligue 2
  - Runners-up (2): 1977–78, 2024–25
- Ligue 3
  - Runners-up: 2014–15
- Championnat National
  - Winners (2): 1988–89, 2005–06
- Championnat National 2
  - Winners: 1987–88
  - Runners-up: 1986–87

== Seasons ==
=== 2016–present ===
Season	Tier	Division	Place	Coupe de France
2016–2017	3	Ligue 3	3rd	Sixth round
2017–2018	2	Ligue 2	8th	Eighth round
2018–2019	2	Ligue 2	4th	Seventh round
2019–2020	2	Ligue 2	17th	Round of 32
2020–2021	2	Ligue 2	5th	Round of 64
2021–2022	2	Ligue 2	4th	Round of 64
2022–2023	2	Ligue 2	7th	Round of 16
2023–2024	2	Ligue 2	5th	Round of 32
2024–2025	2	Ligue 2	2nd	Seventh round
2025–2026	1	Ligue 1	11th	Round of 16
2026–2027	1	Ligue 1		TBD

- 5 seasons in Ligue 1
- 17 seasons in Ligue 2
- 21 seasons in Ligue 3
- 8 seasons in Championnat National
- 4 seasons in Championnat National 2

== Players ==
=== Current squad ===
As of 9 September 2026

Note: Flags indicate national team as defined under FIFA eligibility rules; some limited exceptions apply. Players may hold more than one non-FIFA nationality.

No.	Pos.	Nation	Player
1	GK	GER	Kevin Trapp
3	DF	FRA	Emmanuel Mbemba
4	MF	FRA	Vincent Marchetti
5	DF	SEN	Moustapha Mbow
6	DF	BRA	Otávio
7	MF	FRA	Pablo Pagis
8	MF	CIV	Patrick Zabi
9	FW	MLI	Lassine Sinayoko
10	MF	ALG	Ilan Kebbal
11	FW	CIV	Jean-Philippe Krasso
14	DF	MLI	Hamari Traoré
15	FW	ITA	Luca Koleosho
16	GK	FRA	Obed Nkambadio

No.	Pos.	Nation	Player
17	MF	MLI	Adama Camara
18	FW	FRA	Omar Sissoko
19	DF	FRA	Nhoa Sangui
21	MF	FRA	Maxime Lopez
23	MF	FRA	Rudy Matondo
25	DF	FRA	Yoan Koré
27	FW	NGR	Moses Simon
28	DF	BEL	Thibault De Smet
31	DF	ALG	Samir Chergui
33	MF	FRA	Pierre Lees-Melou (captain)
42	DF	ITA	Diego Coppola
93	FW	FRA	Jonathan Ikoné

=== Reserve team ===
Note: Flags indicate national team as defined under FIFA eligibility rules; some limited exceptions apply. Players may hold more than one non-FIFA nationality.

No.	Pos.	Nation	Player
37	FW	FRA	Mohamed Dao
38	DF	FRA	Kilian Prouchet

=== Out on loan ===
Note: Flags indicate national team as defined under FIFA eligibility rules; some limited exceptions apply. Players may hold more than one non-FIFA nationality.

No.	Pos.	Nation	Player
—	DF	ALG	Anis Fatahine (to Le Puy until 30 June 2027)
—	FW	FRA	Christ Okou (to Clermont until 30 June 2027)

No.	Pos.	Nation	Player
—	FW	MAD	El Hadary Raheriniaina (to Nancy until 30 June 2027)

=== Notable players ===
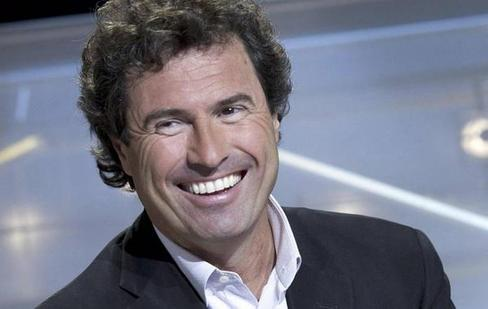
Omar da Fonseca, as seen in 2016

Below are the notable former players who have represented Paris and its predecessors in league and international competition since the club's foundation in 1969. To appear in the section below, a player must have played in at least 80 official matches for the club.

For a complete list of Paris players, see Category:Paris FC players

- (France) Jean-François Beltramini
- (France) Georges Eo
- (France) Bernard Guignedoux
- (France) Fabrice Moreau
- (France) Jimmy Modeste
- (France) Philippe Prieur
- (Algeria) Lamri Laachi
- (Argentina) Omar da Fonseca
- (Gabon) Armand Ossey
- (Socialist Federal Republic of Yugoslavia) Dragoslav Šekularac
- (Germany) Kevin Trapp
- (Italy) Ciro Immobile

== Management and staff ==
=== Board ===
As of 24 September 2025

Position	Name
CEO	Jean-Marc Gallot
President	Pierre Ferracci
Finance director	Alexandre Battut
Global sports director	Jürgen Klopp
Sporting director	Marco Neppe
Director of Development	Yannick Menu

=== Coaching staff ===
Position	Name
Head coach	Liam Rosenior
Assistant coach	Justin Walker; Kalifa Cissé
Goalkeeper coach	Mickael Boully
Performance manager	Pascal Faure
Fitness coach	Pierre De Nadaï; Mathieu Dubarry
Chief analyst	Ben Warner
Video analyst	Clément Marie
Match analyst	Thibaud Combin
Doctor	Nicolas Jubin
Doctor	François Drouard
Physical trainer	Pierre De Nadai; Mathieu Dubarry
Video analyst	Thibauld Combin; Matheo Mace
Physiotherapist	Brice Chevalier; Grégoire Semiond; Thomas Bossard
Massage therapist	Hervé Gallorini
Team manager	Camille Stassin
Kit manager	Pierre Garbin; Souleymane Samassa

== Coaching history ==
- (France) Louis Hon (1972–73)
- (France) Antoine Dalla Cieca (1973–76)
- (France) Robert Vicot (1976–79)
- (France) Roger Lemerre (1979–81)
- (Argentina) Alberto Muro (1981–83)
- (France) Luc Rabat (1983–86)
- (France) Pierre Lechantre (1987–92)
- (France) Hubert Velud (1992)
- (Argentina) Delio Onnis (1992–95)
- (France) Hubert Velud (1995–99)
- (France) Jean-François Charbonnier (1999)
- (France) Jean-Pierre Carayon (1999 – November 99)
- (France) Robert Buigues (November 1999–02)
- (France) Philippe Lemaître (2002–04)
- (France) Patrick Parizon (2002–05)
- (France) Jean-Marc Pilorget (2005–07)
- (France) Jean-Guy Wallemme (2007–08)
- (France) Jean-Marc Pilorget (2008–09)
- (France) Jean-Luc Vannuchi (2009–11)
- (Cameroon) Alain Mboma (2011–12)
- (France) Olivier Guillou (2012)
- (France) Alexandre Monier (2012–13)
- (Mauritania) Gaston Diamé (2013)
- (France) Christophe Taine (2013–15)
- (France) Denis Renaud (2015)
- (France) Jean-Luc Vasseur (2015–16)
- (France) Réginald Ray (2016–17)
- (France) Fabien Mercadal (2017–18)
- (Bosnia and Herzegovina) Mehmed Baždarević (2018–19)
- (France) René Girard (2019–21)
- (France) Thierry Laurey (2021–23)
- (France) Stéphane Gilli (2023–26)
- (France) Antoine Kombouaré (2026)
- (England) Liam Rosenior (2026–present)

== Women's team ==
The women's team of Paris FC was founded in 1971 as ES Juvisy-sur-Orge and declared officially as a section of the club in 2017. It currently plays in the first division, called Première Ligue.

== See also ==
- History of Paris FC
- Football in Paris
