= 2022–23 Valenciennes FC season =

Valenciennes FC
2022–23 season
- President: Eddy Zdziech
- Head coach: Christophe Delmotte
- Stadium: Stade du Hainaut
- Ligue 2: 14th
- Coupe de France: Round of 64
- Top goalscorer: League: Adrian Grbić (9); All: Adrian Grbić (9)
Home colours	Away colours	Third colours
- All statistics correct as of 22 May 2023.

The 2022–23 season was the 110th in the history of Valenciennes FC and their ninth consecutive season in the second division. The club participated in Ligue 2 and the Coupe de France.

== Players ==
As of 25 July 2022.

Note: Flags indicate national team as defined under FIFA eligibility rules; some limited exceptions apply. Players may hold more than one non-FIFA nationality.

No.	Pos.	Nation	Player
1	GK	FRA	Gautier Larsonneur (on loan from Brest)
2	DF	FRA	Éric Vandenabeele
6	MF	FRA	Julien Masson
7	FW	TOG	Floyd Ayité
8	MF	BFA	Sacha Bansé
10	MF	FRA	Florian Martin
11	FW	FRA	Ugo Bonnet
14	DF	FRA	Joffrey Cuffaut
15	FW	FRA	Aeron Zinga
16	GK	BFA	Hillel Konaté
17	MF	ALG	Aymen Boutoutaou
19	DF	FRA	Nassim Innocenti
20	FW	FRA	Ilyes Hamache

No.	Pos.	Nation	Player
21	MF	FRA	Mohamed Kaba
22	FW	MAR	Yacine El Amri
24	DF	FRA	Allan Linguet
25	MF	FRA	Madou Touré
26	DF	FRA	Mathieu Debuchy
27	MF	FRA	Mathis Picouleau
28	DF	FRA	Quentin Lecoeuche
29	MF	FRA	Jawed Kalai
31	DF	FRA	Aloïs Penin
36	MF	FRA	Eyram Viegbe
37	DF	FRA	Mattéo Rabuel
—	GK	FRA	Lassana Sy

== Pre-season and friendlies ==
Win Draw Loss Fixtures

1 July 2022 Friendly	Valenciennes (France)	1–0	(France) UNFP	Cambrai
18:00 CEST (UTC+2)	Hamache 87'			Stadium: Stade de la Liberté; Attendance: 600

8 July 2022 Friendly	Lens (France)	3–0	(France) Valenciennes	Avion
16:00 CEST (UTC+2)	Camara 48'; Clauss 52'; Danso 64'			Stadium: Stade Daniel Leclercq

16 July 2022 Friendly	Zulte Waregem (Belgium)	1–1	(France) Valenciennes	Waregem, Belgium
16:00 CEST (UTC+2)				Stadium: Elindus Arena

23 July 2022 Friendly	Valenciennes (France)	2–1	(France) Boulogne	Valenciennes
15:30 CEST (UTC+2)				Stadium: Stade du Hainaut

23 July 2022 Friendly	Valenciennes (France)	0–0	(France) Dunkerque	Valenciennes
18:00 CEST (UTC+2)				Stadium: Stade du Hainaut

22 September 2022 Friendly	Valenciennes (France)	0–1	(Belgium) Oostende	Valenciennes
14:30 CEST (UTC+2)			Ndicka 59'

14 December 2022 Friendly	Standard Liège (Belgium)	0–1	(France) Valenciennes	Liège, Belgium
14:00 CET (UTC+1)		Report	Kaba 80'	Stadium: Stade Maurice Dufrasne

== Competitions ==
=== Overall record ===
Competition	First match	Last match	Starting round	Record							
Competition	First match	Last match	Starting round	Pld	W	D	L	GF	GA	GD	Win %
Ligue 2	30 July 2022	2 June 2023	Matchday 1	7	3	3	1	7	6	+1	42.86
Coupe de France	30 October 2022		Seventh round	0	0	0	0	0	0	+0	—
Total				7	3	3	1	7	6	+1	42.86

Last updated: 2 September 2022
Source: Soccerway

=== Ligue 2 ===
==== League table ====
Pos	Team	Pld	W	D	L	GF	GA	GD	Pts	Promotion or Relegation
14	Rodez	38	11	13	14	39	44	−5	46	
15	Laval	38	14	4	20	44	56	−12	46	
16	Valenciennes	38	10	15	13	42	49	−7	45	
17	Annecy	38	11	12	15	39	51	−12	45	Spared from relegation
18	Dijon (R)	38	10	12	16	38	43	−5	42	Relegation to Championnat National

Source: Ligue 2
Rules for classification: 1) Points; 2) Goal difference; 3) Number of goals scored; 4) Head-to-head goal difference; 5) Fair play points
(R) Relegated

==== Results summary ====
Overall								Home						Away					
Pld	W	D	L	GF	GA	GD	Pts	W	D	L	GF	GA	GD	W	D	L	GF	GA	GD
7	3	3	1	7	6	+1	12	2	2	0	6	4	+2	1	1	1	1	2	−1

Last updated: 2 September 2022.
Source: Ligue 2

==== Results by round ====
Round	1	2	3	4	5	6	7
Ground	A	H	A	H	H	A	H
Result	D	W	L	D	D	W	W
Position	8	6	11	12	14	9	

Updated to match(es) played on 2 September 2022. Source: Ligue 2
A = Away; H = Home; W = Win; D = Draw; L = Loss

==== Matches ====
The league fixtures were announced on 17 June 2022.

30 July 2022 1	Bordeaux	0–0	Valenciennes	Bordeaux
19:00 CEST (UTC+2)		Report		Stadium: Matmut Atlantique; Attendance: 19,279; Referee: Benjamin Lepaysant

6 August 2022 2	Valenciennes	1–0	Le Havre	Valenciennes
19:00 CEST (UTC+2)	Hamache 13'	Report		Stadium: Stade du Hainaut; Attendance: 4,657; Referee: Alexandre Perreau Niel

13 August 2022 3	Metz	2–0	Valenciennes	Metz
19:00 CEST (UTC+2)	Jallow 29'; Mikautadze 86'	Report		Stadium: Stade Saint-Symphorien; Attendance: 14,253; Referee: Mikael Lesage

20 August 2022 4	Valenciennes	0–0	Quevilly-Rouen	Valenciennes
19:00 CEST (UTC+2)		Report		Stadium: Stade du Hainaut; Attendance: 4,443; Referee: Romain Lissorgue

27 August 2022 5	Valenciennes	2–2	Saint-Étienne	Valenciennes
19:00 CEST (UTC+2)	Zinga 26'; Cuffaut 90+4' (pen.)	Report	Maçon 30'; Krasso 48'	Stadium: Stade du Hainaut; Attendance: 8,210; Referee: Guillaume Paradis

30 August 2022 6	Niort	0–1	Valenciennes	Niort
20:45 CEST (UTC+2)		Report	Hamache 30'	Stadium: Stade René Gaillard; Attendance: 2,300; Referee: Faouzi Benchabane

2 September 2022 7	Valenciennes	3–2	Nîmes	Valenciennes
20:45 CEST (UTC+2)	Kaba 29'; Noubissi 49'; Bonnet 77'	Report	Tchokounté 45' (pen.); Koné 69'	Stadium: Stade du Hainaut; Attendance: 4,740; Referee: Alexandre Perreau Niel

10 September 2022 8	Rodez	1–1	Valenciennes	Rodez
19:00 CEST (UTC+2)	Senaya (yellow card) 49'; Corredor 52'; Boissier (yellow card) 61' (yellow-red card) 70'	Report	Debuchy (yellow card) 42'; Noubissi 73'; Picouleau (yellow card) 90+4'	Stadium: Stade Paul-Lignon; Attendance: 1,275; Referee: Mikael Lesage

17 September 2022 9	Pau	1–0	Valenciennes	Pau
19:00 CEST (UTC+2)	Evan (yellow card) 26'; D'Almeida (yellow card) 40'; Gomis (yellow card) 70'; Bassouamina 72'	Report	Debuchy (yellow card) 33' (yellow-red card) 48'; Bonnet (yellow card) 59'	Stadium: Nouste Camp; Attendance: 2,708; Referee: Nicolas Rainville

1 October 2022 10	Valenciennes	2–1	Sochaux	Valenciennes
19:00 CEST (UTC+2)	Kaba (yellow card) 15'; Cuffaut (penalty scored) 25'; Diliberto 58', (yellow card) 90+4'; Picouleau (yellow card) 60'; Innocenti (yellow card) 72'	Report	Kalulu 31'; Ndiaye (yellow card) 70'; Do Couto (yellow card) 89'	Stadium: Stade du Hainaut; Attendance: 5,704; Referee: Pierre Legat

8 October 2022 11	Paris FC	0–1	Valenciennes	Paris
19:00 CEST (UTC+2)	Dabila (yellow card) 50' (yellow-red card) 56'	Report	Diliberto 22'; Buatu (yellow card) 55'; Berthomier (yellow card) 80'	Stadium: Stade Sébastien Charléty; Attendance: 3,157; Referee: Faouzi Benchabane

15 October 2022 12	Valenciennes	1–0	Guingamp	Valenciennes
19:00 CEST (UTC+2)	Cuffaut 36'; Berthomier (yellow card) 72'	Report	Muyumba (yellow card) 35'	Stadium: Stade du Hainaut; Attendance: 5,761; Referee: Aurélien Petit

22 October 2022 13	Grenoble	1–0	Valenciennes	Grenoble
19:00 CEST (UTC+2)	Diarra (yellow card) 34'; Gaspar (yellow card) 71'; Tchaptchet 85'	Report		Stadium: Stade des Alpes; Attendance: 5,074; Referee: Florent Batta

5 November 2022 14	Valenciennes	1–1	Caen	Valenciennes
19:00 CET (UTC+1)	Cuffaut (penalty scored) 39', (yellow card) 56'; Noubissi (yellow card) 88'	Report	Ntim (yellow card) 6'; Mendy 23'; Mandrea (yellow card) 37'; Thomas (yellow card) 41'; Abdi (yellow card) 90+1'	Stadium: Stade du Hainaut; Attendance: 11,212; Referee: Abdelatif Kherradji

12 November 2022 15	Laval	1–0	Valenciennes	Laval
19:00 CEST (UTC+2)	Gonçalves (red card) 17'; Tavares (red card) 34'; Baudry 41'; Maggiotti (yellow card) 67'	Report	Berthomier (yellow card) 49'	Stadium: Stade Francis Le Basser; Attendance: 6,823; Referee: Benjamin Lepaysant

26 December 2022 16	Valenciennes	1–1	Amiens	Valenciennes
19:00 CET (UTC+1)	Picouleau 22'	Report	Fofana (MF) (yellow card) 16'; Kakuta 23', (yellow card) 60'	Stadium: Stade du Hainaut; Attendance: 6,339; Referee: Antoine Valnet

30 December 2022 17	Bastia	1–0	Valenciennes	Furiani
21:00 CET (UTC+1)	Ndiaye (yellow card) 41'; Dramé 78'; Alfarela (yellow card) 89'	Report	Kaba (yellow card) 54'; Linguet (yellow card) 89'	Stadium: Stade Armand-Cesari; Attendance: 8,900; Referee: Benjamin Lepaysant

10 January 2023 18	Valenciennes	2–2	Annecy	Valenciennes
19:00 CET (UTC+1)	Boutoutaou 45+1', 73'; Linguet (yellow card) 59'	Report	Sahi 42', 70'; Kashi (yellow card) 85'	Stadium: Stade du Hainaut; Attendance: 6,277; Referee: Benoît Bastien

13 January 2023 19	Dijon	2–1	Valenciennes	Dijon
20:45 CEST (UTC+2)	Le Bihan 45+1'; Camara 75'	Report	Berthomier (penalty scored) 50'; Boutoutaou (yellow card) 89'	Stadium: Stade Gaston Gérard; Attendance: 5,883; Referee: Gaël Angoula

28 January 2023 20	Valenciennes	1–1	Metz	Valenciennes
19:00 CET (UTC+2)	Bonnet 75'	Report	Joseph 90+2'	Stadium: Stade Nungesser; Attendance: 5,303; Referee: Aurélien Petit

31 January 2023 21	Sochaux	4–0	Valenciennes	Montbéliard
20:45 CET (UTC+1)	Linguet 14' (o.g.); Mauricio 20'; Doumbia (yellow card) 51', (goal) 64'; Dossou 87'	Report	Picouleau (yellow card) 16'; Touré (yellow card) 49'	Stadium: Stade Auguste Bonal; Attendance: 8,623; Referee: Olivier Thual

3 February 2023 22	Valenciennes	3–1	Laval	Valenciennes
20:45 CET (UTC+2)	Grbić (penalty scored) 12'; Diliberto 17'; Ayité 90+3'	Report	Duterte (yellow card) 16'; Sylla (yellow card) 34'; Naidji 82'; Roye (yellow card) 86'	Stadium: Stade Nungesser; Attendance: 5,369; Referee: Romain Lissorgue

11 February 2022 23	Guingamp	3–1	Valenciennes	Guingamp
19:00 CET (UTC+1)	Gaudin (yellow card) 30'; Gomis 41'; Guillaume 60'; El Ouazzani 90'	Report	Debuchy 66'	Stadium: Stade de Roudourou; Attendance: 7,052; Referee: Rémi Landry

18 February 2023 24	Valenciennes	0–0	Rodez	Valenciennes
19:00 CET (UTC+2)		Report	Chougrani (yellow card) 4'; Boissier (yellow card) 81'	Stadium: Stade Nungesser; Attendance: 6,646; Referee: Abdelatif Kherradji

25 February 2023 25	Valenciennes	2–2	Dijon	Valenciennes
19:00 CET (UTC+2)	Kaba 51'; Grbić (penalty scored) 55'; Ben Seghir (yellow card) 82'	Report	Fofana (yellow card) 40'; Le Bihan 49'; Silva 72'; Thioune (yellow card) 78'	Stadium: Stade Nungesser; Attendance: 5,124; Referee: Azzédine Souifi

4 March 2023 26	Quevilly-Rouen	1–1	Valenciennes	Le Petit-Quevilly
19:00 CET (UTC+1)	Bangré 86'	Report	Grbić 1'; Diliberto (yellow card) 11'; Masson (yellow card) 50'; Hamache (yellow card) 56'; Debuchy	Stadium: Stade Robert Diochon; Attendance: 3,217; Referee: Guillaume Paradis

11 March 2023 27	Valenciennes	2–2	Bastia	Valenciennes
19:00 CET (UTC+2)	Debuchy (yellow card) 15'; Grbić 25', 48'; Linguet (yellow card) 30'; Picouleau (yellow card) 79'	Report	Magri 4', 69'	Stadium: Stade Nungesser; Attendance: 8,631; Referee: Aurélien Petit

18 March 2023 28	Caen	2–1	Valenciennes	Caen
19:00 CET (UTC+1)	Brahimi 8'; Mendy (yellow card) 45' (goal) 76'; Vandermersch (yellow card) 62'; Hafid (yellow card) 90'	Report	Bonnet 29'	Stadium: Stade Michel d'Ornano; Attendance: 11,825; Referee: Clément Turpin

1 April 2023 29	Valenciennes	4–5	Paris FC	Valenciennes
19:00 CEST (UTC+2)	Grbić 5', 45+1'; Masson (yellow card) 40'; Kaba 62'; Lecoeuche (yellow card) 72'; Buatu 85'	Report	Guilavogui 33', 38', (yellow card) 43', (goal) 58'; Koré 80'; Boutaïb 90'	Stadium: Stade Nungesser; Attendance: 9,908; Referee: Gaël Angoula

10 April 2023 30	Annecy	2–1	Valenciennes	Annecy
20:45 CEST (UTC+2)	Kashi (yellow card) 16' (yellow-red card) 56'; Ntamack Ndimba 29'; Temanfo (yellow card) 45'; Shamal 84'	Report	Buatu 40'; Linguet (yellow card) 82'; Kaba (yellow card) 87'	Stadium: Parc des Sports; Attendance: 4,951; Referee: Alexandre Perreau Niel

15 April 2023 31	Valenciennes	0–0	Niort	Valenciennes
19:00 CEST (UTC+2)	Boudraa (yellow card) 19'; Cuffaut (yellow card) 31'	Report		Stadium: Stade Nungesser; Attendance: 8,375; Referee: Benjamin Lepaysant

22 April 2023 32	Amiens	0–2	Valenciennes	Amiens
19:00 CET (UTC+1)	Fofana (MF) (yellow card) 34'; Opoku (yellow card) 37'	Report	Masson (yellow card) 11'; Linguet 52'; Boudraa (yellow card) 65'; Berthomier 71'	Stadium: Stade de la Licorne; Attendance: 6,784; Referee: Olivier Thual

29 April 2023 33	Valenciennes	0–2	Bordeaux	Valenciennes
19:00 CEST (UTC+2)	Poha (yellow card) 39'	Report	Maja (yellow card) 32', (goal) 82'; Barbet 69'	Stadium: Stade Nungesser; Attendance: 9,477; Referee: Antoine Valnet

6 May 2023 34	Nîmes	3–3	Valenciennes	Nîmes
19:00 CET (UTC+1)	Saïd 3'; Tchokounté (yellow card) 41'; Poulain 65'; Benezet 71'; Ambri (yellow card) 90+6'	Report	Hamache (yellow card) 21', (goal) 44'; Boutoutaou 61', 70'; Buatu (yellow card) 86'	Stadium: Stade des Antonins; Attendance: 2,784; Referee: Rémi Landry

13 May 2023 35	Valenciennes	1–1	Pau	Valenciennes
19:00 CEST (UTC+2)	Masson (yellow card) 55'; Grbić 66', (yellow card) 68'	Report	D'Almeida (yellow card) 20'; Bassouamina (yellow card) 74'; Kouassi (yellow card) 76'; George 79'	Stadium: Stade Nungesser; Attendance: 12,669; Referee: William Toulliou

22 May 2023 36	Le Havre	0–2	Valenciennes	Le Havre
19:00 CEST (UTC+2)	Desmas (yellow card) 5'; Lloris (yellow card) 45'	Report	Grbić (penalty scored) 7'; Poha (yellow card) 42'; Kaba 45+2'; Lecoeuche (yellow card) 79'	Stadium: Stade Océane; Attendance: 19,799; Referee: Karim Abed

26 May 2023 37	Valenciennes	1–0	Grenoble	Valenciennes
20:45 CEST (UTC+2)	Kaba 57'	Report	Mendy (yellow card) 8'	Stadium: Stade Nungesser; Attendance: 21,790; Referee: Gaël Angoula

2 June 2023 38	Saint-Étienne	2–0	Valenciennes	Saint-Étienne
20:45 CEST (UTC+2)	Cafaro (yellow card) 45+1'; Krasso 48'; Appiah (yellow card) 71'; Bamba 81'	Report	Cuffaut (yellow card) 73'; Bonnet (yellow card) 90+2'	Stadium: Stade Geoffroy-Guichard; Attendance: 39,873; Referee: Abdelatif Kherradji

=== Coupe de France ===
29 October 2022 7th Rnd	Valenciennes	1–1 (3–1 p)	Red Star F.C.	Valenciennes
18:00 CEST	Zinga 53'	Report	Fall 78'	Stadium: Stade du Hainaut; Attendance: 2,938; Referee: Mickaël Leleu

19 November 2022 8th Rnd	Entente Feignies Aulnoye FC	0–3	Valenciennes	Maubeuge
15:00 CET		Report	Nomel 11', 71'; Zinga 56'	Stadium: Stade Léo Lagrange; Attendance: 1,852; Referee: Rémi Landry

6 January 2023 Rnd of 64	Paris FC	3–1	Valenciennes	Paris
18:00 CET	Caddy (penalty scored) 28'; Chahiri 49'; Guilavogui 69'	Report	Berthomier (penalty scored) 16'	Stadium: Stade Sébastien Charléty; Attendance: 2,614; Referee: Guillaume Paradis
