= 2021–22 Valenciennes FC season =

Valenciennes FC
2021–22 season
- President: Eddy Zdziech
- Head coach: Christophe Delmotte
- Stadium: Stade du Hainaut
- Ligue 2: 16th
- Coupe de France: Round of 64
- Top goalscorer: League: Baptiste Guillaume (6); All: Baptiste Guillaume (7)
Home colours	Away colours	Third colours

The 2021–22 season was the 109th season in the existence of Valenciennes FC and the club's eighth consecutive season in the second division of French football. In addition to the domestic league, Valenciennes participated in this season's edition of the Coupe de France.

== Players ==
=== First-team squad ===
As of 1 February 2022.

Note: Flags indicate national team as defined under FIFA eligibility rules; some limited exceptions apply. Players may hold more than one non-FIFA nationality.

No.	Pos.	Nation	Player
2	DF	FRA	Éric Vandenabeele
3	DF	MTN	Aly Abeid
5	DF	ALG	Maxime Spano
6	MF	FRA	Julien Masson
7	MF	TOG	Floyd Ayité
8	MF	FRA	Noah Diliberto
9	MF	FRA	Gaëtan Robail (on loan from Lens)
10	MF	CMR	Arsène Elogo
11	DF	FRA	Laurent Dos Santos (captain)
12	FW	FRA	Ugo Bonnet
13	MF	FRA	Florian Martin
14	DF	FRA	Joffrey Cuffaut
15	FW	CIV	Cheick Timité
16	GK	CIV	Hillel Konaté

No.	Pos.	Nation	Player
17	MF	ALG	Aymen Boutoutaou
18	FW	BEL	Baptiste Guillaume
19	MF	BFA	Abou Ouattara
20	MF	FRA	Ilyes Hamache
21	MF	FRA	Mohamed Kaba
22	MF	MLI	Sambou Yatabaré
23	MF	FRA	Gaëtan Arib
24	DF	FRA	Allan Linguet
25	DF	GHA	Emmanuel Ntim
26	DF	FRA	Mathieu Debuchy
27	MF	FRA	Mathis Picouleau
28	DF	FRA	Quentin Lecoeuche
29	MF	FRA	Jawed Kalai
30	GK	FRA	Lucas Chevalier (on loan from Lille)

=== Out on loan ===
Note: Flags indicate national team as defined under FIFA eligibility rules; some limited exceptions apply. Players may hold more than one non-FIFA nationality.

No.	Pos.	Nation	Player
—	GK	FRA	Nicolas Kocik (on loan to Cholet until 30 June 2022)
—	MF	BEN	Sessi D'Almeida (on loan to Tondela until 30 June 2022)

No.	Pos.	Nation	Player
—	FW	CIV	Moussa Guel (on loan to Red Star until 30 June 2022)
—	FW	CIV	Issouf Macalou (on loan to Le Mans until 30 June 2022)

== Pre-season and friendlies ==
Win Draw Loss

2 July 2021 Friendly	Valenciennes (France)	0–0	(France) Dunkerque	Cambrai, France
17:00 CEST (UTC+2)				Stadium: Stade de la Liberté

6 July 2021 Friendly	Kortrijk (Belgium)	0–1	(France) Valenciennes	Kortrijk, Belgium
11:00 CEST (UTC+2)			Boutoutaou 26'	Stadium: Guldensporenstadion

10 July 2021 Friendly	OH Leuven (Belgium)	1–0	(France) Valenciennes	Oud-Heverlee, Belgium
15:00 CEST (UTC+2)	Vekemans			Stadium: Gemeentelijk Stadion

14 July 2021 Friendly	Union Saint-Gilloise (Belgium)	1–1	(France) Valenciennes	Overijse, Belgium
18:00 CEST (UTC+2)	Lapoussin 7'		Boutoutaou 81'	Stadium: Begijnhofstadion

17 July 2021 Friendly	Valenciennes (France)	0–1	(France) Reims	Valenciennes, France
18:00 CEST (UTC+2)			Hornby 28'	Stadium: Stade du Hainaut

7 October 2021 Friendly	Valenciennes (France)	3–2	(Belgium) Kortrijk	Valenciennes, France
11:30 CEST (UTC+2)	Ouattara 32'; Yatabaré 46'; Hamache 72'		Messaoudi 22'; Mbayo 62'	Stadium: Stade du Hainaut

== Competitions ==
=== Overall record ===
Competition	First match	Last match	Starting round	Final position	Record							
Competition	First match	Last match	Starting round	Final position	Pld	W	D	L	GF	GA	GD	Win %
Ligue 2	24 July 2021	14 May 2022	Matchday 1	16th	38	10	14	14	34	47	−13	26.32
Coupe de France	14 November 2021	16 December 2021	Seventh round	Round of 64	3	2	0	1	6	2	+4	66.67
Total					41	12	14	15	40	49	−9	29.27

Source: Soccerway

=== Ligue 2 ===
==== League table ====
Pos	Team	Pld	W	D	L	GF	GA	GD	Pts	Promotion or Relegation
14	Amiens	38	9	17	12	43	41	+2	44	
15	Grenoble	38	12	8	18	32	44	−12	44	
16	Valenciennes	38	10	14	14	34	47	−13	44	
17	Rodez	38	10	13	15	32	42	−10	43	
18	Quevilly-Rouen (O)	38	10	10	18	33	50	−17	40	Qualification for the relegation play-offs

Source: Ligue 2
Rules for classification: 1) Points; 2) Goal difference; 3) Number of goals scored; 4) Head-to-head goal difference; 5) Fair play points
(O) Play-off winners

==== Results summary ====
Overall								Home						Away					
Pld	W	D	L	GF	GA	GD	Pts	W	D	L	GF	GA	GD	W	D	L	GF	GA	GD
38	10	14	14	34	47	−13	44	5	5	9	19	28	−9	5	9	5	15	19	−4

Source: Ligue 2

==== Results by round ====
Round	1	2	3	4	5	6	7	8	9	10	11	12	13	14	15	16	17	18	19	20	21	22	23	24	25	26	27	28	29	30	31	32	33	34	35	36	37	38
Ground	H	A	H	A	H	A	H	A	H	A	A	H	A	H	A	H	A	H	A	H	A	H	A	H	A	H	A	H	H	A	H	A	H	A	H	A	H	A
Result	D	D	L	W	L	L	L	D	W	W	W	L	L	L	D	W	D	L	D	D	L	W	D	L	D	W	D	D	D	W	L	L	L	L	D	D	W	W
Position	14	11	15	12	15	16	17	18	16	13	10	12	15	16	17	13	14	17	17	16	17	15	16	17	17	15	14	15	15	15	15	15	15	16	16	16	16	16

Source: Ligue 2
A = Away; H = Home; W = Win; D = Draw; L = Loss

==== Matches ====
The league fixtures were announced on 25 June 2021.

24 July 2021 1	Valenciennes	0–0	Niort	Valenciennes
20:00 CEST (UTC+2)	Kaba (yellow card) 58'; D'Almeida (yellow card) 75'	Report	Vallier (yellow card) 41'; Boutobba (yellow card) 65'; Louiserre (yellow card) 73'	Stadium: Stade du Hainaut; Referee: Arnaud Baert

31 July 2021 2	Guingamp	1–1	Valenciennes	Guingamp
19:00 CET (UTC+1)	Diarra (yellow card) 4'; M'Changama (yellow card) 60'; Muyumba (yellow card) 63'; Sampaio (yellow card) 79', (goal) 90'	Report	Masson (yellow card) 10'; D'Almeida (yellow card) 24'; Robail 76'	Stadium: Stade de Roudourou; Referee: Mathieu Vernice

7 August 2021 3	Valenciennes	0–3	Nîmes	Valenciennes
19:00 CEST (UTC+2)	Cuffaut (yellow card) 28'; Yatabaré (yellow card) 70'	Report	Fomba (yellow card) 32'; Ómarsson (yellow card) 45+1', (goal) 56'; Benrahou 81'; Eliasson 83'	Stadium: Stade du Hainaut; Referee: Bartolomeu Varela

14 August 2021 4	Nancy	0–1	Valenciennes	Tomblaine
19:00 CEST (UTC+2)	El Kaoutari (yellow card) 4'; Haag (yellow card) 11' (yellow-red card) 68'	Report	Abeid (yellow card) 31'; Robail 48'; Guillaume (yellow card) 74'; Masson (yellow card) 90'	Stadium: Stade Marcel Picot; Referee: Pierre Legat

21 August 2021 5	Valenciennes	1–4	Rodez	Valenciennes
19:00 CEST (UTC+2)	Guillaume 16'; Dos Santos (red card) 31'; Robail (yellow card) 35'; Yatabaré (yellow card) 52'	Report	Buadés 27', 47'; Leborgne (yellow card) 56'; Bardy (yellow card) 59'; Ouammou (yellow card) 66'; Dépres 73'; David 77'	Stadium: Stade du Hainaut; Referee: Benjamin Lepaysant

28 August 2021 6	Toulouse	1–0	Valenciennes	Toulouse
15:00 CEST (UTC+2)	Evitt-Healey (yellow card) 13'; Onaiwu 45+2'; Ngoumou (yellow card) 59'; Dejaegere (yellow card) 76'	Report		Stadium: Stadium de Toulouse; Referee: Mathieu Vernice

11 September 2021 7	Valenciennes	1–2	Rouen	Valenciennes
19:00 CEST (UTC+2)	Guillaume 18'; Ouattara (yellow card) 44'; D'Almeida (yellow card) 53'	Report	Diaby (yellow card) 20'; Bansais (yellow card) 23'; Nazon (yellow card) 52'; Haddad (penalty missed) 57; Boé-Kane 57'; Gbellé 83'	Stadium: Stade du Hainaut; Referee: Arnaud Baert

18 September 2021 8	Pau	1–1	Valenciennes	Pau
19:00 CEST (UTC+2)	Assifuah 14', (yellow card) 65'; Boto (yellow card) 40'; Armand (yellow card) 59'; Beusnard 79'	Report	Yatabaré 24'; Doukouré (yellow card) 51'; Cuffaut (yellow card) 68'	Stadium: Nouste Camp; Referee: Jordane Lomi

21 September 2021 9	Valenciennes	2–1	Bastia	Valenciennes
20:00 CEST (UTC+2)	Cuffaut 7' (pen.); Ntim (yellow card) 16'; Lecoeuche (yellow card) 62'; Robail 66'; Kaba (yellow card) 88'	Report	Palun (yellow card) 6'; Santelli 43'; Robic (yellow card) 57'	Stadium: Stade du Hainaut; Referee: Alexandre Perreau Niel

24 September 2021 10	Dijon	0–1	Valenciennes	Dijon
19:00 CEST (UTC+2)	Benzia (yellow card) 85'; Scheidler (yellow card) 85'	Report	Ayité (yellow card) 43'; Picouleau 45'; Hamache (yellow card) 57'; Ouattara (yellow card) 73'; Haouari (yellow card) 90'	Stadium: Stade Gaston Gérard; Referee: Frank Schneider

2 October 2021 11	Caen	1–2	Valenciennes	Caen
19:00 CEST (UTC+2)	Gonçalves (yellow card) 73'; Chahiri 90+2'	Report	Abdi 16' (o.g.); Robail 29'; Debuchy (yellow card) 31'; Robail (yellow card) 81'	Stadium: Stade Michel d'Ornano; Attendance: 8,490; Referee: Abdelatif Kherradji

16 October 2021 12	Valenciennes	1–3	Dunkerque	Valenciennes
20:00 CEST (UTC+2)	Ntim (yellow card) 2'; Yatabaré (yellow card) 27'; Hamache 54'; Kaba (yellow card) 74'	Report	Rocheteau 3' (pen.), 47'; Dudouit (yellow card) 7'; Azankpo 41'; Kikonda (yellow card) 45+1'; Kerrouche (yellow card) 74'; Pierre (yellow card) 78'	Stadium: Stade du Hainaut; Referee: Benjamin Lepaysant

23 October 2021 13	Amiens	3–0	Valenciennes	Amiens
19:00 CEST (UTC+2)	Badji (yellow card) 35'; Lusamba 42' (pen.). 78'; Bamba 57', (yellow card) 77'; Lomotey (yellow card) 81'	Report	Lecoeuche (yellow card) 77'	Stadium: Stade de la Licorne; Referee: Bartolomeu Varela

1 November 2021 14	Valenciennes	1–2	Auxerre	Valenciennes
20:45 CET (UTC+1)	Hamache 48'	Report	Sinayoko 50'; Perrin 63'	Stadium: Stade du Hainaut; Referee: Aurelien Petit

6 November 2021 15	Le Havre	0–0	Valenciennes	Le Havre
19:00 CEST (UTC+2)		Report	Ntim (yellow card) 90+2'	Stadium: Stade Océane; Referee: Arnaud Baert

20 November 2021 16	Valenciennes	1–0	Grenoble	Valenciennes
20:45 CET (UTC+1)	Guillaume 21'; Kaba (yellow card) 55'; D'Almeida (yellow card) 76'	Report	Maubleu (red card) 32'; Ravet (yellow card) 82'	Stadium: Stade du Hainaut; Referee: Gaël Angoula

3 December 2021 17	Ajaccio	0–0	Valenciennes	Ajaccio
19:00 CET (UTC+1)	Botué (yellow card) 80'	Report	Masson (yellow card) 61'; Doukouré (yellow card) 66'; Ntim (yellow card) 84'	Stadium: Stade François Coty; Referee: Pierre Legat

11 December 2021 18	Valenciennes	1–4	Paris FC	Valenciennes
19:00 CET (UTC+1)	Yatabaré (yellow card) 4'; Cuffaut (yellow card) 5'; Masson (yellow card) 22'; Guillaume (yellow card) 28', (goal) 65'	Report	Name 6' (pen.); Guilavogui 18', (yellow card) 49'; Laura 20'; Siby (yellow card) 26'; Alfarela 80'	Stadium: Stade du Hainaut; Referee: Arnaud Baert

21 December 2021 19	Sochaux	1–1	Valenciennes	Montbéliard
20:45 CET (UTC+1)	Thioune (yellow card) 31'; Mauricio (yellow card) 46', (goal) 63'	Report	Ayité 11'; Lecoeuche (yellow card) 45+1' (yellow-red card) 54'; Chevalier (yellow card) 86'	Stadium: Stade Auguste Bonal; Referee: Abdelatif Kherradji

8 January 2022 20	Valenciennes	1–1	Guingamp	Valenciennes
19:00 CET (UTC+1)	Ntim 22'; Debuchy (red card) 73'	Report	Lemonnier (yellow card) 26'; Sivis (yellow card) 70'; Pierrot 75' (pen.), (yellow card) 75'	Stadium: Stade du Hainaut; Referee: Gaël Angoula

28 January 2022 21	Nîmes	2–1	Valenciennes	Nîmes
20:45 CET (UTC+1)	Benrahou 11' (pen.); Ponceau 16'; Fomba (yellow card) 42'	Report	Picouleau (yellow card) 5'; Cuffaut 53' (pen.); Guillaume (yellow card) 62'	Stadium: Stade des Costières; Referee: Romain Lissorgue

1 February 2022 22	Valenciennes	6–1	Nancy	Valenciennes
19:00 CET (UTC+1)	Yatabaré 12', 18'; Cuffaut 24' (pen.); Guillaume 31', 50'; Kaba (yellow card) 41'; Hamache 44'; Ouattara (yellow card) 87'	Report	Bianda (yellow card) 2'; Karamoko (yellow card) 17' (yellow-red card) 23'; Biron 27'; Latouchent (yellow card) 46'; El Kaoutari (yellow card) 60'	Stadium: Stade du Hainaut; Referee: Mathieu Vernice

5 February 2022 23	Rodez	0–0	Valenciennes	Rodez
19:00 CET (UTC+1)	Vilhjálmsson (yellow card) 78'; Boissier (yellow card) 79'	Report		Stadium: Stade Paul-Lignon; Referee: Olivier Thual

12 February 2022 24	Valenciennes	1–3	Toulouse	Valenciennes
15:00 CET (UTC+1)		Report		Stadium: Stade du Hainaut

19 February 2022 25	Quevilly-Rouen	1–1	Valenciennes	Rouen
19:00 CET (UTC+1)	Diaby 40'; Sidibé (yellow card) 54'; Gbellé (yellow card) 76'	Report	Kaba (yellow card) 18'; Debuchy (yellow card) 27'; Bonnet 29'; Yatabaré (yellow card) 70'; Lecoeuche (yellow card) 87'	Stadium: Stade Robert Diochon; Referee: Guillaume Paradis

26 February 2022 26	Valenciennes	1–0	Pau	Valenciennes
19:00 CET (UTC+1)	Ayité 66'; Masson (yellow card) 71'; Bonnet (yellow card) 71'; Linguet (yellow card) 75'	Report	Dembélé (yellow card) 28'	Stadium: Stade du Hainaut; Referee: Benjamin Lepaysant

5 March 2022 27	Bastia	1–1	Valenciennes	Furiani
19:00 CET (UTC+1)	Sainati (yellow card) 16'; Abeid 20' (o.g.); Magri (yellow card) 64'; Robic (yellow card) 87'; Guidi (yellow card) 89'	Report	Bonnet 11', (yellow card) 89'; Abeid (yellow card) 59'; Chevalier (yellow card) 87'	Stadium: Stade Armand Cesari; Referee: Jérôme Brisard

12 March 2022 28	Valenciennes	0–0	Dijon	Valenciennes
19:00 CET (UTC+1)	Lecoeuche (yellow card) 14'; Ntim (yellow card) 22'; Masson (yellow card) 30'; Linguet (yellow card) 39'; Cuffaut (yellow card) 82'	Report	Traoré (yellow card) 12'; Pi (yellow card) 42'; Coulibaly (red card) 61'	Stadium: Stade du Hainaut; Referee: Mathieu Vernice

15 March 2022 29	Valenciennes	1–1	Caen	Valenciennes
19:00 CET (UTC+1)	Ntim 24'; Cuffaut (yellow card) 42'; Kaba (yellow card) 43'; Yatabaré (yellow card) 59'; Masson (yellow card) 89'	Report	da Costa 13'; Abdi (yellow card) 59'; Cissé (yellow card) 88'	Stadium: Stade du Hainaut; Referee: Abdelatif Kherradji

19 March 2022 30	Dunkerque	1–2	Valenciennes	Dunkirk
19:00 CET (UTC+1)	Niané 81'	Report	Linguet 9'; Boutoutaou 84'	Stadium: Stade Marcel-Tribut; Referee: Frank Schneider

2 April 2022 31	Valenciennes	0–2	Amiens	Valenciennes
19:00 CEST (UTC+1)	Cuffaut (yellow card) 41'; Picouleau (yellow card) 67'	Report	Akolo 29', 33'	Stadium: Stade du Hainaut; Referee: Arnaud Baert

9 April 2022 32	Auxerre	1–0	Valenciennes	Auxerre
15:00 CEST (UTC+1)	Pellenard 8'; Sinayoko (yellow card) 60'	Report	Debuchy (yellow card) 52'; Masson (yellow card) 52'; Lecoeuche (yellow card) 89'	Stadium: Stade de l'Abbé-Deschamps; Referee: Gaël Angoula

16 April 2022 33	Valenciennes	0–1	Le Havre	Valenciennes
19:00 CEST (UTC+1)	Chevalier (yellow card) 15'; Masson (yellow card) 75'; Linguet (yellow card) 81'	Report	Abline 14', (yellow card) 81'; Richardson (yellow card) 89'	Stadium: Stade du Hainaut; Referee: Pierre Legat

19 April 2022 34	Grenoble	3–0	Valenciennes	Grenoble
20:00 CEST (UTC+1)	Jeno (yellow card) 24'; Tell 31' (pen.); Michel (yellow card) 45+2' de Iriondo (yellow card) 65'; Bambock (yellow card) 83'; Correa 85'; Anani 88'	Report	Linguet (yellow card) 63'; Ntim (yellow card) 90'	Stadium: Stade des Alpes; Referee: Olivier Thual

22 April 2022 35	Valenciennes	0–0	Ajaccio	Valenciennes
19:00 CEST (UTC+1)	Robail (yellow card) 71'; Boutoutaou (yellow card) 80'	Report	Marchetti (yellow card) 10'; Courtet (yellow card) 13'; Moussiti-Oko (yellow card) 76'	Stadium: Stade du Hainaut; Referee: Frank Schneider

30 April 2022 36	Paris FC	1–1	Valenciennes	Paris
19:00 CEST (UTC+1)	Alfarela 11'; Siby (yellow card) 34'; Guilavogui (yellow card) 49'; Bernauer (yellow card) 57'; Boutaïb (yellow card) 70'	Report	Hamache 3'; Debuchy (yellow card) 90+7'	Stadium: Stade Sébastien Charléty; Referee: Guillaume Paradis

7 May 2022 37	Valenciennes	1–0	Sochaux	Valenciennes
19:00 CEST (UTC+1)	Ntim (yellow card) 39'; Bonnet 50'; Cuffaut (yellow card) 54'; Robail (yellow card) 81'	Report	Ndiaye (yellow card) 36'; Henry (yellow card) 52'; Kitala (yellow card) 90+3'	Stadium: Stade du Hainaut; Referee: Jeremy Stinat

14 May 2022 38	Niort	1–2	Valenciennes	Niort
19:00 CEST (UTC+1)	Bentil 28'	Report	Bonnet 37'; Kalai 74'	Stadium: Stade René Gaillard; Referee: Abdelatifa Kherradji

=== Coupe de France ===
14 November 2021 Seventh round	US Tourcoing FC	0–2	Valenciennes	Tourcoing
14:30 CET (UTC+1)		Report	Hamache 57'; Sidibe 67'	Stadium: Stade Charles Van de Veegaete; Referee: Ali Djedid

27 November 2021 Eighth round	Calonne-Ricouart FC Cite 6	1–4	Valenciennes	Avion
16:00 CET (UTC+1)	Tahar 27'	Report	Doukouré 45' (pen.); Picouleau 57'; Guillaume 74'; Hamache 89'	Stadium: Stade François Blin; Referee: Mehdi Mokhtari

16 December 2021 Round of 64	Valenciennes	0–1	Strasbourg	Valenciennes
21:00 CET (UTC+1)		Report	Diallo 15'	Stadium: Stade du Hainaut; Attendance: 3,206; Referee: Olivier Tuhal
