= 2023–24 Valenciennes FC season =

Valenciennes FC
2023–24 season
- Manager: Jorge Maciel (until 6 December); Ahmed Kantari (from 7 December)
- Stadium: Stade du Hainaut
- Ligue 2: 20th (relegated)
- Coupe de France: Semi-finals
- Top goalscorer: League: Aymen Boutoutaou (4); All: Andrew Jung (5)

The 2023–24 season is Valenciennes FC's 111th season in existence and 10th consecutive in the Ligue 2. They are also competing in the Coupe de France.

== Players ==
=== First-team squad ===
As of 1 September 2023

Note: Flags indicate national team as defined under FIFA eligibility rules; some limited exceptions apply. Players may hold more than one non-FIFA nationality.

| No. | Pos. | Nation | Player |
|---|---|---|---|
| 4 | DF | ENG | Taylor Moore |
| 5 | MF | FRA | Jason Berthomier |
| 6 | MF | FRA | Julien Masson |
| 8 | MF | BFA | Sacha Bansé |
| 9 | FW | CMR | Marius Noubissi |
| 10 | FW | NED | Nick Venema |
| 11 | FW | FRA | Ugo Bonnet |
| 14 | DF | FRA | Joffrey Cuffaut |
| 15 | DF | NED | Lucas Woudenberg |
| 16 | GK | FRA | Jean Louchet |
| 17 | MF | ALG | Aymen Boutoutaou |
| 18 | FW | FRA | Landry Nomel |
| 19 | DF | FRA | Nassim Innocenti |
| 20 | FW | FRA | Ilyes Hamache |
| 22 | FW | MAR | Yacine El Amri |
| 23 | MF | DEN | David Kruse |

| No. | Pos. | Nation | Player |
|---|---|---|---|
| 24 | DF | FRA | Allan Linguet |
| 25 | MF | FRA | Madou Touré |
| 28 | MF | POR | Bruno Costa |
| 29 | MF | FRA | Jawed Kalai |
| 30 | GK | FRA | Lassana Diabaté |
| 34 | MF | COD | Makabi Lilepo |
| 36 | MF | FRA | Eyram Viegbe |
| 39 | DF | ANG | Jonathan Buatu |
| 40 | GK | NIG | Naim Van Attenhoven |
| 41 | MF | FRA | Sofiane Boudraa |
| 45 | MF | FRA | Tidyane Diagouraga |
| 49 | DF | FRA | Joachim Kayi Sanda |
| 54 | DF | FRA | Jordan Poha |
| 57 | DF | FRA | Gabin Blanquart |
| 63 | MF | FRA | Ismail Bouneb |
| 93 | MF | FRA | Anthony Knockaert |

== Transfers ==
=== In ===
| Pos. | Player | Transferred from | Fee | Date | Source |
|---|---|---|---|---|---|
| FW | (Netherlands) Nick Venema | (Netherlands) VVV-Venlo | Undisclosed | 15 August 2023 | |
| MF | (France) Anthony Knockaert | (England) Fulham | Free | 1 September 2023 | |
| MF | (Portugal) Bruno Costa | (Portugal) Porto B | | 1 September 2023 | |
| FW | (Nigeria) Mathias Oyewusi | (Lithuania) FK Žalgiris | Free | 1 January 2024 | |
| DF | (Bosnia and Herzegovina) Halid Šabanović | (France) Angers | Loan | 30 January 2024 | |
| FW | (Mali) Siriné Doucouré | (France) Lorient | Loan | 1 February 2024 | |
| MF | (Cameroon) Jean-Éric Moursou | (Cameroon) Coton Sport | | 2 February 2024 | |

=== Out ===
| Pos. | Player | Transferred to | Fee | Date | Source |
|---|---|---|---|---|---|
| MF | (France) Mohamed Kaba | (Italy) Lecce | €3,000,000 | 14 August 2023 | |
| FW | (France) Ugo Bonnet | (France) En Avant Guingamp | Free | 1 February 2024 | |
| DF | (Burkina Faso) Nassim Innocenti | (Slovakia) FC Košice | Undisclosed | 2 February 2024 | |

== Pre-season and friendlies ==
Win Draw Loss Fixtures

| 29 July 2023 Friendly | Dunkerque (France) | 2–2 | (France) Valenciennes |
| 19:00 | Youssouf 31'; Mbemba 90' | | Boutoutaou 37', 59' |

| 8 September 2023 Friendly | RWD Molenbeek (Belgium) | 1–2 | (France) Valenciennes |
| 15:00 |

| 12 October 2023 Friendly | Oostende (Belgium) | 2–2 | (France) Valenciennes |
| 13:00 |

== Competitions ==
=== Overall record ===
| Competition | First match | Last match | Starting round | Final position | Record | | | | | | | |
| Competition | First match | Last match | Starting round | Final position | Pld | W | D | L | GF | GA | GD | Win % |
|---|---|---|---|---|---|---|---|---|---|---|---|---|
| Ligue 2 | 5 August 2023 | 17 May 2024 | Matchday 1 | 20th | 36 | 5 | 11 | 20 | 25 | 51 | −26 | 13.89 |
| Coupe de France | 18 November 2023 | 2 April 2024 | Seventh round | Semi-finals | 7 | 4 | 2 | 1 | 10 | 7 | +3 | 57.14 |
| Total | | | | | 43 | 9 | 13 | 21 | 35 | 58 | −23 | 20.93 |

Last updated: 10 May 2024
Source: Soccerway

=== Ligue 2 ===
==== League table ====
| Pos | Team | Pld | W | D | L | GF | GA | GD | Pts | Promotion or Relegation |
|---|---|---|---|---|---|---|---|---|---|---|
| 16 | Dunkerque | 38 | 12 | 10 | 16 | 36 | 52 | −16 | 46 | |
| 17 | Troyes | 38 | 9 | 14 | 15 | 42 | 50 | −8 | 41 | Spared from relegation |
| 18 | Quevilly-Rouen (R) | 38 | 7 | 17 | 14 | 51 | 55 | −4 | 38 | Relegation to National |
| 19 | Concarneau (R) | 38 | 10 | 8 | 20 | 39 | 57 | −18 | 38 | Relegation to National |
| 20 | Valenciennes (R) | 38 | 6 | 11 | 21 | 26 | 54 | −28 | 29 | Relegation to National |

Updated to match(es) played on 17 May 2024. Source: Ligue 2
Rules for classification: 1) Points; 2) Goal difference; 3) Number of goals scored; 4) Head-to-head goal difference; 5) Fair play points
(R) Relegated

==== Results summary ====
| Overall | | | | | | | | Home | | | | | | Away | | | | | |
| Pld | W | D | L | GF | GA | GD | Pts | W | D | L | GF | GA | GD | W | D | L | GF | GA | GD |
|---|---|---|---|---|---|---|---|---|---|---|---|---|---|---|---|---|---|---|---|
| 17 | 1 | 8 | 8 | 10 | 23 | −13 | 11 | 0 | 4 | 4 | 5 | 11 | −6 | 1 | 4 | 4 | 5 | 12 | −7 |

Last updated: 6 December 2023.

==== Results by round ====
| Round | 1 | 2 | 3 | 4 | 5 | 6 | 7 | 8 | 9 | 10 | 11 | 12 | 13 | 14 | 15 | 16 | 17 |
|---|---|---|---|---|---|---|---|---|---|---|---|---|---|---|---|---|---|
| Ground | H | A | H | A | A | H | A | H | A | H | A | H | A | H | A | H | A |
| Result | L | L | D | W | D | L | D | L | L | D | D | D | L | L | D | D | L |
| Position | 18 | 20 | 18 | 17 | 17 | 19 | 18 | 19 | 19 | 18 | 18 | 18 | 20 | | | | |

Updated to match(es) played on 6 December 2023. Source:
A = Away; H = Home; W = Win; D = Draw; L = Loss

==== Matches ====
The league fixtures were unveiled on 29 June 2023.

| 5 August 2023 1 | Valenciennes | 2–4 | Auxerre | Valenciennes |
| 19:00 | | | | Stadium: Stade du Hainaut |

| 12 August 2023 2 | Bastia | 3–0 | Valenciennes | Furiani |
| 19:00 |

| 19 August 2023 3 | Valenciennes | 0–0 | Guingamp |

| 26 August 2023 4 | Rodez | 0–1 | Valenciennes |

| 2 September 2023 5 | Saint-Étienne | 0–0 | Valenciennes |

| 16 September 2023 6 | Valenciennes | 1–2 | Bordeaux |

| 23 September 2023 7 | Amiens | 0–0 | Valenciennes | Amiens |
| 19:00 |

| 26 September 2023 8 | Valenciennes | 0–1 | Concarneau | Valenciennes |
| 20:45 | | | | Stadium: Stade du Hainaut |

| 30 September 2023 9 | Laval | 1–0 | Valenciennes | Laval |
| 19:00 | | Report |

| 7 October 2023 10 | Valenciennes | 1–1 | Troyes | Valenciennes |
| 19:00 | | | | Stadium: Stade du Hainaut |

| 21 October 2023 11 | Grenoble | 3–3 | Valenciennes |

| 28 October 2023 12 | Valenciennes | 2–2 | Caen |

| 4 November 2023 13 | Angers | 2–0 | Valenciennes | Angers |
| 19:00 | | | | Stadium: Stade Raymond Kopa |

| 11 November 2023 14 | Valenciennes | 0–1 | Dunkerque | Valenciennes |
| 19:00 CET (UTC+1) | | | | Stadium: Stade du Hainaut |

| 25 November 2023 15 | Quevilly-Rouen | 0–0 | Valenciennes | Le Petit-Quevilly |
| 19:00 | | | | Stadium: Stade Robert Diochon |

| 2 December 2023 16 | Valenciennes | 0–0 | Annecy | Valenciennes |
| 19:00 CET (UTC+1) | | | | Stadium: Stade du Hainaut |

| 5 December 2023 17 | Pau | 3–1 | Valenciennes | Pau |
| 20:45 CET (UTC+1) | Sylla 45+2' (pen.), 89'; Mons Bassouamina 71' | Report | Venema 47' | Stadium: Nouste Camp; Referee: Abdelatif Kherradji |

| 16 December 2023 18 | Valenciennes | 0–1 | Paris FC | Valenciennes |
| 19:00 CET (UTC+1) | | Report | | Stadium: Stade du Hainaut |

| 19 December 2023 19 | Ajaccio | 2–1 | Valenciennes | Ajaccio |
| 20:45 CET (UTC+1) | | Report | | Stadium: Stade François Coty |

| 13 January 2024 20 | Valenciennes | 0–1 | Amiens | Valenciennes |
| CET (UTC+1) | | Report | | Stadium: Stade du Hainaut |

| 23 January 2024 21 | Bordeaux | 3–1 | Valenciennes | Bordeaux |
| 20:45 CET (UTC+1) | | Report | | Stadium: Matmut Atlantique |

| 27 January 2024 22 | Valenciennes | 3–1 | Bastia | Valenciennes |
| CET (UTC+1) | | Report | | Stadium: Stade du Hainaut |

| 3 February 2024 23 | Concarneau | 1–0 | Valenciennes | TBD |
| CET (UTC+1) | | Report |

| 10 February 2024 24 | Valenciennes | 1–1 | Laval | Valenciennes |
| CET (UTC+1) | | Report | | Stadium: Stade du Hainaut |

| 17 February 2024 25 | Dunkerque | 2–1 | Valenciennes | Dunkirk |
| CET (UTC+1) | | Report | | Stadium: Stade Marcel-Tribut |

| 24 February 2024 26 | Valenciennes | 0–2 | Rodez | Valenciennes |
| CET (UTC+1) | | Report | | Stadium: Stade du Hainaut |

| 2 March 2024 27 | Auxerre | 0–0 | Valenciennes | Auxerre |
| CET (UTC+1) | | Report | | Stadium: Stade de l'Abbé-Deschamps |

| 9 March 2024 28 | Valenciennes | 0–0 | Angers | Valenciennes |
| CET (UTC+1) | | Report | | Stadium: Stade du Hainaut |

| 16 March 2024 29 | Guingamp | 3–0 | Valenciennes | Guingamp |
| CET (UTC+1) | | Report | | Stadium: Stade de Roudourou |

| 30 March 2024 30 | Valenciennes | 0–2 | Saint-Étienne | Valenciennes |
| CET (UTC+1) | | Report | | Stadium: Stade du Hainaut |

| 6 April 2024 31 | Annecy | 2–1 | Valenciennes | Annecy |
| | | Report | | Stadium: Parc des Sports |

| 13 April 2024 32 | Valenciennes | 1–4 | Pau | Valenciennes |
| | | Report | | Stadium: Stade du Hainaut |

| 20 April 2024 33 | Paris FC | 2–1 | Valenciennes | Paris |
| | | Report | | Stadium: Stade Sébastien Charléty |

| 23 April 2024 34 | Valenciennes | 1–0 | Ajaccio | Valenciennes |
| 20:45 | | Report | | Stadium: Stade du Hainaut |

| 27 April 2024 35 | Valenciennes | 2–0 | Grenoble | Valenciennes |
| | | Report | | Stadium: Stade du Hainaut |

| 3 May 2024 36 | Troyes | 0–1 | Valenciennes | Troyes |
| | | Report | | Stadium: Stade de l'Aube |

| 10 May 2024 37 | Valenciennes | 2–1 | Quevilly-Rouen | Valenciennes |
| 20:45 | | Report | | Stadium: Stade du Hainaut |

| 17 May 2024 38 | Caen | 3–0 | Valenciennes | Caen |
| 20:45 | | Report | | Stadium: Stade Michel d'Ornano |

=== Coupe de France ===
| 18 November 2023 Seventh round | FCSR Haguenau | 0–2 | Valenciennes |

| 10 December 2023 Eighth round | FC Mulhouse | 1–1 (4–5 p) | Valenciennes | Mulhouse |
| 15:00 CET (UTC+1) | | | | Stadium: Stade de l'Ill |

| 5 January 2024 Round of 64 | Sarreguemines FC | 0–2 | Valenciennes |

| 20 January 2024 Round of 32 | Valenciennes | 2–1 | Paris FC |

| 7 February 2024 Round of 16 | AS Saint-Priest | 1–2 | Valenciennes |

| 28 February 2024 Quarter-finals | FC Rouen | 1–1 (2–4 p) | Valenciennes |

| 2 April 2024 Semi-finals | Lyon | 3–0 | Valenciennes |
