= Mamoudou Cissokho =

French footballer (2007)

Personal information
- Full name: Mamoudou Baka Cissokho
- Date of birth: 20 December 2007 (age 18)
- Place of birth: Paris, France
- Height: 1.82 m (6 ft 0 in)
- Position: Winger

Team information
- Current team: Auxerre
- Number: 44

Youth career
- –2023: Créteil
- 2024: Versailles
- 2025–2026: Auxerre

Senior career*
Years	Team	Apps	(Gls)
2025–	Auxerre B	15	(3)
2025–	Auxerre	2	(0)
- * Club domestic league appearances and goals as of 23:38, 10 August 2026 (UTC)

Mamoudou Baka Cissokho (born 20 December 2007) is a French professional footballer who plays as a winger for Ligue 1 club Auxerre.

== Career ==
Cissokho joined Auxerre in January 2025, initially playing for the club's under-19s. In the 2025–26 season, he made his professional debuts in Ligue 1 in wins over Metz (3–1) and Angers (3–1), and also made an appearance in the Coupe de France against Monaco (2–1 defeat). On 15 June 2026, he signed his first professional contract, a deal with Auxerre until 30 June 2029.

== Personal life ==
Born in France, Cissokho is of Malian descent.
