= Hamache =

Hamache is a surname. Notable people with the surname include:

- Ilyes Hamache (born 2003), French footballer
- Yanis Hamache (born 1999), French-Algerian footballer
