= Mathieu Debuchy =

French association football player (born 1985)

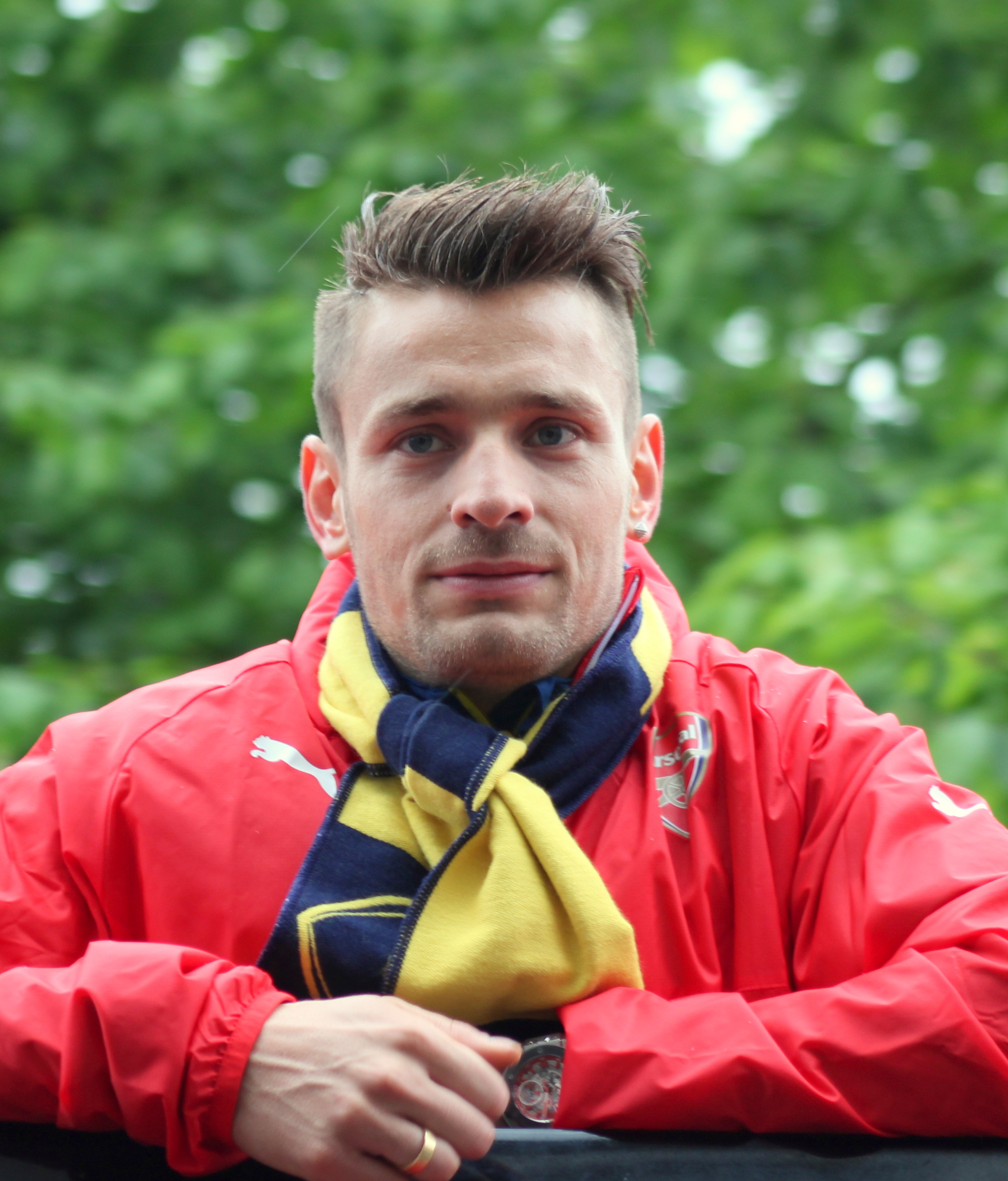
- Debuchy after winning the 2015 FA Cup Final with Arsenal

Personal information
- Full name: Mathieu Debuchy
- Date of birth: 28 July 1985 (age 41)
- Place of birth: Fretin, France
- Height: 1.76 m (5 ft 9 in)
- Position: Right-back

Youth career
- 1992–1993: Fretin
- 1993–2003: Lille

Senior career*
Years	Team	Apps	(Gls)
2003–2013	Lille	233	(16)
2013–2014	Newcastle United	43	(1)
2014–2018	Arsenal	13	(1)
2016	→ Bordeaux (loan)	9	(0)
2018–2021	Saint-Étienne	86	(11)
2021–2023	Valenciennes	53	(1)
Total		437	(30)

International career
2005–2006	France U21	5	(0)
2011–2015	France	27	(2)
- * Club domestic league appearances and goals

Mathieu Debuchy (French pronunciation: [matjø dəbyʃi]; born 28 July 1985) is a French former professional footballer who played as a right-back.

Debuchy started his senior career at Lille, where he won a Ligue 1 and Coupe de France double in the 2010–11 season. He played in Ligue 1 for 10 seasons for Lille. He joined Newcastle United in January 2013 and stayed there for 18 months. Debuchy played for Arsenal from July 2014 to January 2018, including a loan spell to Bordeaux in 2016. From January 2018 to August 2021, he played for Saint-Étienne.

Debuchy made his debut for the France national team in October 2011. He earned 27 caps, playing in the final tournaments of UEFA Euro 2012 and the 2014 FIFA World Cup.

== Club career ==
=== Lille ===
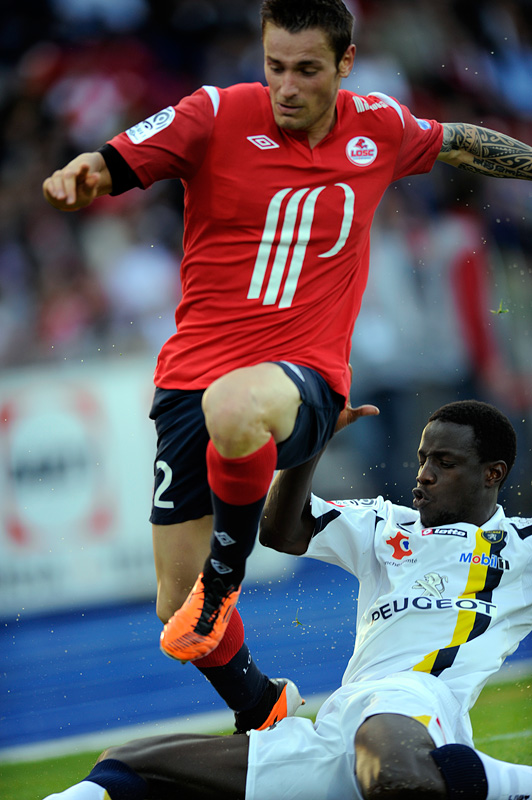
Debuchy (left) playing for Lille in 2011

Debuchy was born in Fretin, Nord. He began his career playing for his hometown club Union Sportive Fretin before joining Lille at the age of eight. After spending a decade in Lille's youth system, he was promoted to the senior team following the winter break of the 2003–04 season. Debuchy was given the number 33 shirt and simultaneously made his professional debut and first start on 31 January 2004 in a league match against Metz. He played the entire match as Lille recorded a 1–0 win. Debuchy made five more appearances that season, which included two starts and three substitute appearances.

The following season, Debuchy switched to the number 2 and his playing time increased significantly. He appeared in 19 matches and scored three goals. His first professional goal came against Bordeaux. Debuchy scored the goal in the first minute of the match. Lille's solid form that season resulted in the club finishing second in the league and, as a result, qualifying for the UEFA Champions League. Debuchy was also instrumental in Lille's run to the Round of 16 in 2004–05 UEFA Cup where the club was eliminated by rival French club Auxerre.

Debuchy became a fixture in the starting eleven during the 2005–06 season. On 26 March 2006, he damaged knee ligaments in a league match against Strasbourg. The injury required surgery ruling him out for six months. As a result of the injury, Debuchy missed the 2006 UEFA European Under-21 Championship. A week after suffering the injury, on 4 April, Lille officials awarded Debuchy a contract extension until 2010.

Debuchy signed a contract extension on 28 February 2011, tying him down to the club until 2015. That season he was instrumental in the team's advancement to the final of the Coupe de France appearing in all five matches the team contested. In the final, Debuchy played the entire match as Lille defeated Paris Saint-Germain 1–0 at the Stade de France. Lille were awarded a late penalty shortly after going 1-0 up; Debuchy took the penalty but it was saved by Grégory Coupet, however Lille still held on to win 1-0. A week later, Lille clinched the Ligue 1 championship by drawing 2–2 away to Paris Saint-Germain, Debuchy providing the cross from which Moussa Sow netted Lille's second goal. The result meant that the players had achieved the club's first league championship since the 1953–54 season and the club's first double since the 1945–46 season. The domestic cup and league title were the first two domestic honours of Debuchy's career.

The following season started off with a 1–1 draw against Nancy on 6 August 2011, with Debuchy opening the scoring in the 47th minute. Debuchy was part of the Lille squad that dramatically fell 5–4 to Bordeaux on 12 February 2012, scoring Lille's third goal of the game as former teammate, Ludovic Obraniak netted the winner in the 90th minute. The following weekend, Lille got back on track with a 1–0 defeat of Lorient, as Debuchy scored the only goal of the game. Debuchy started and played the full 90 minutes in all six group games of the Champions League that season, as Lille finished bottom of their tight group and crashed out of Europe because of a 0–0 draw with Trabzonspor on the final matchday. The campaign was hugely successful for Debuchy on a personal level as he made his breakthrough in the French squad as well as being named in the UNFP Team of the Year. Following the season, Lille manager Rudi Garcia described Debuchy as a defender who "plays high and attacks but defensively is also very rigorous and he exudes confidence." Garcia also revealed that the club had rejected a £4 million bid from Newcastle United.

=== Newcastle United ===
Seven months after their failed bid, English club Newcastle United signed Debuchy on a five-and-a-half-year contract on 4 January 2013, for an undisclosed fee reportedly in the region of £5.5 million. He made his debut for Newcastle on 12 January 2013 against Norwich City.

He scored his first and only Newcastle United competitive goal of his career in the Premier League Tyne–Wear derby against Sunderland at the Stadium of Light on 27 October 2013, levelling the score after half time before Newcastle ultimately lost the match 2–1. On 1 January 2014, Debuchy was sent off for the first time in his Newcastle career after a rash challenge on Claudio Yacob in an eventual 1–0 defeat away to West Bromwich Albion.

=== Arsenal ===
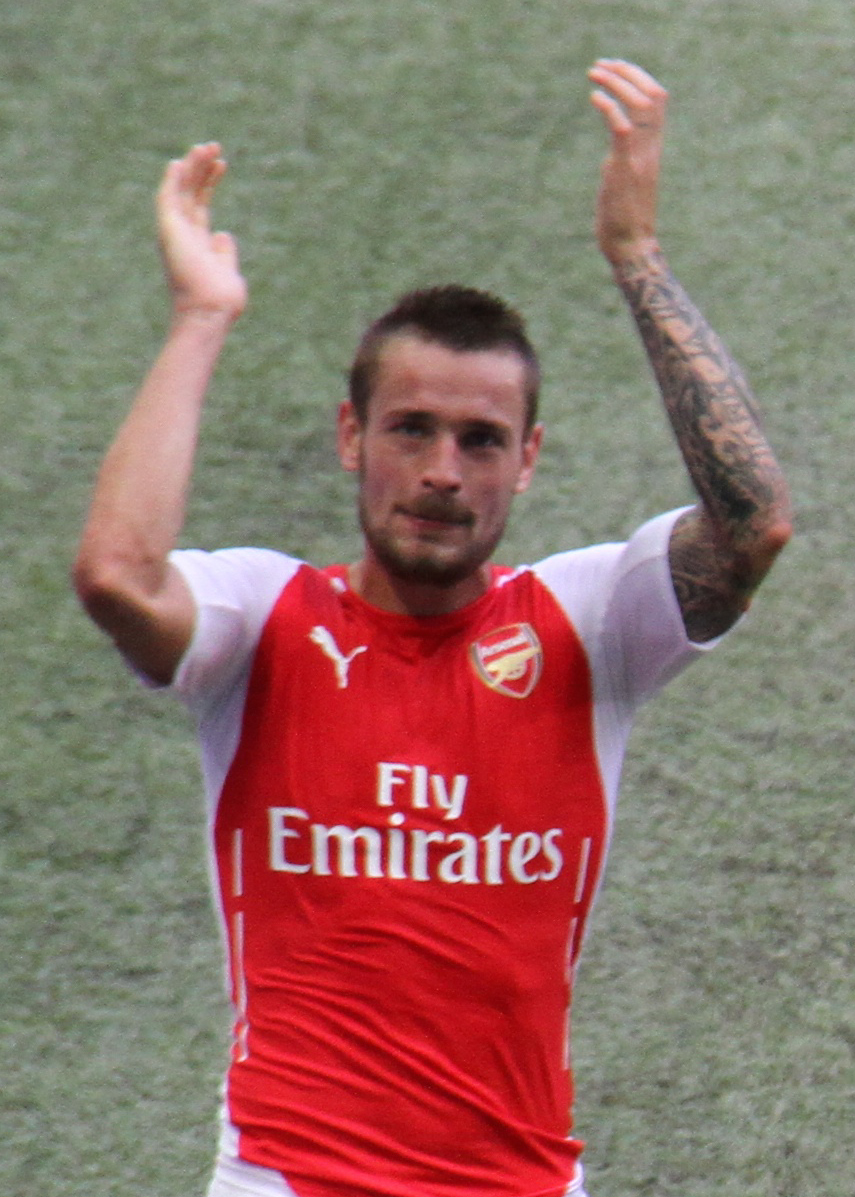
Debuchy after winning the 2014 FA Community Shield with Arsenal

Debuchy moved to fellow Premier League club Arsenal on 17 July 2014, signing a long-term deal for an undisclosed fee (believed to be around £12 million) and was given the number 2 shirt from fellow Frenchman Abou Diaby, who took the vacant number 24. He said "Playing again in the Champions League is a big excitement for me and I will do my best to help Arsenal compete for trophies".

He made his competitive debut for Arsenal in their 3–0 victory over defending league champions Manchester City in the 2014 FA Community Shield at Wembley Stadium on 10 August 2014. Six days later he featured in the Premier League for the first time as an Arsenal player, his injury-time shot was saved and then converted by Aaron Ramsey for a 2–1 win at home against Crystal Palace. Debuchy was sent off for two bookings on 27 August in Arsenal's win over Beşiktaş in the Champions League play-offs.

On 13 September 2014, Debuchy damaged his ankle ligaments near the end of a 2–2 draw against Manchester City. He was administered oxygen and taken off the pitch on a stretcher. Following surgery on his ankle, he was ruled out for about three months. He returned to the first team against Galatasaray in a Champions League match on 9 December. Twelve days after that, he scored his first goal for the club, the first equaliser in a 2–2 draw against Liverpool at Anfield. Debuchy went off injured against Stoke City on 11 January 2015. He was then given an operation on his dislocated shoulder, and ruled out for a further three months.

Debuchy made his return from injury on 18 April 2015, playing the full 120 minutes as Arsenal defeated Reading 2–1 in the FA Cup semi-finals at Wembley. He made no further appearances that season, with Héctor Bellerín instead playing at right-back in Arsenal's 4–0 win over Aston Villa in the Cup Final; Debuchy did not make the substitutes bench for that match.

Arsenal retained the Community Shield on 2 August, with Bellerín again starting ahead of Debuchy. Debuchy played only two 2015–16 Premier League matches, starting in Arsenal's first Premier League match of the 2015–16 season against West Ham United on 9 August and also starting in the Premier League match against Tottenham Hotspur on 8 November.

On 22 July 2016, after finishing his half-season loan spell at Ligue 1 club Bordeaux, Debuchy returned to Arsenal during the pre-season, playing the first half of Arsenal's 1–1 friendly away draw against French Ligue 2 side Lens. On 27 November 2016, he made his first Premier League start against AFC Bournemouth at the Emirates Stadium, but went off with a hamstring injury after just 16 minutes as the Gunners won 3–1, ruling him out until January 2017. He made no further appearances for the first team that season.

On 19 October 2017, Debuchy made his first start for Arsenal for almost a year against Red Star Belgrade in a 1–0 victory in the UEFA Europa League. On 24 October 2017, he played his first League Cup game of the season against Norwich City, which Arsenal won 2–1 after extra time.

==== Loan to Bordeaux ====
On 1 February 2016, Debuchy joined Ligue 1 club Bordeaux on loan until the end of the 2015–16 season.

=== Saint-Étienne ===
On 31 January 2018, six months before the expiry of his contract with Arsenal, Debuchy joined Ligue 1 club Saint-Étienne on a free transfer; his contract with Saint-Étienne would run until the end of the 2017–18 season.

On 2 February 2018, Debuchy started in his competitive debut for Saint-Étienne in the Ligue 1 2–0 away win over Amiens; he was at the heart of most of Saint-Étienne's dangerous attacks, scored a goal in the 62nd minute and was voted the Man of the Match. On 25 February, Debuchy scored Saint-Étienne's equaliser in the 90th minute of the Derby du Rhône against Lyon, an away Ligue 1 match which ended in a 1–1 draw. On 6 April, Debuchy provided a 17th-minute assist (his cross enabled Rémy Cabella to tap home from close range) and scored an own goal in the 92nd minute in the Ligue 1 1–1 home draw against Paris Saint-Germain. On 14 April, Debuchy scored in the 82nd minute from Saint-Étienne's only shot on target of the match, a Ligue 1 1–0 away win over Strasbourg.

On 25 June 2018, Debuchy signed a new three-year contract with Saint-Étienne. On 14 April 2019, Debuchy scored the first brace of his career in Ligue 1, in the 3–0 home win over Bordeaux.

=== Valenciennes and Retirement ===
On 13 August 2021, Debuchy signed with Ligue 2 side Valenciennes.

In May 2023, Debuchy announced that he would retire at the end of season and also explained that he registered to pass the first coaching diploma. He ended his professional career at the end of the 2022–23 season.

== International career ==
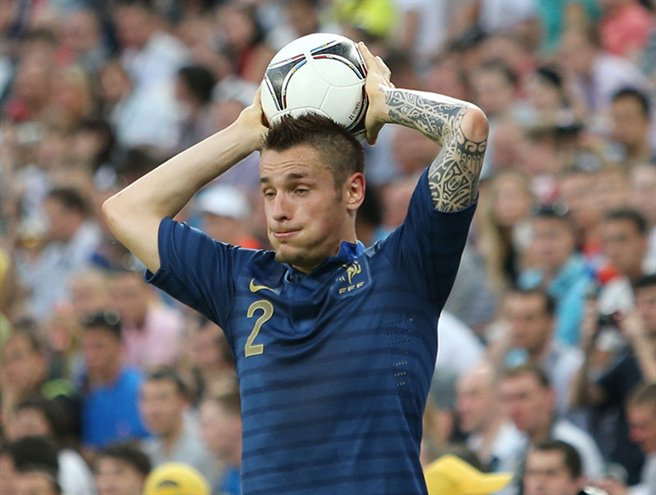
Debuchy playing for France at UEFA Euro 2012

Debuchy has been capped with the under-21 team. On 5 August 2010, Debuchy was called up to the senior team for the first time by new manager Laurent Blanc for the team's friendly against Norway on 11 August 2010 but did not play that match. He finally earned his first cap on 7 October 2011, playing every minute of the Euro 2012 qualifying 3–0 home win over Albania. Debuchy scored his first goal for France in a friendly against Iceland in Valenciennes on 27 May 2012.

Blanc selected Debuchy in his final 23-man squad for the European Championships in Poland and Ukraine on 29 May 2012. He started the match and played every minute as a right-back in Les Bleus' opening group match against England, helping his side to a 1–1 draw, in which his performance was hailed as "terrific". He played the full 90 minutes of France's second group match, a 2–0 win over co-hosts Ukraine on 15 June. Debuchy also played the full 90 minutes of France's last group match against Sweden, which France lost 2–0. He started in the quarterfinal match against Spain (the French lost the match 2–0), but was replaced by Jérémy Ménez in the 64th minute.

Debuchy was named in Didier Deschamps' French squad for the 2014 FIFA World Cup in Brazil. Debuchy played every minute of four of France's five matches as they reached the quarterfinals. He did not play France's final group match against Ecuador, remaining on the substitutes' bench throughout the match, with Bacary Sagna playing in his place.

On 17 May 2018, he was named on the standby list for the 23-man French squad for the 2018 FIFA World Cup in Russia.

On 10 November 2018, Debuchy announced his retirement from international football.

== Career statistics ==
=== Club ===
Appearances and goals by club, season and competition
Club	Season	League			National cup (Note: Includes Coupe de France, FA Cup)		League cup (Note: Includes Coupe de la Ligue, Football League Cup)		Europe		Other		Total	
Club	Season	Division	Apps	Goals	Apps	Goals	Apps	Goals	Apps	Goals	Apps	Goals	Apps	Goals
Lille	2003–04	Ligue 1	6	0	0	0	0	0	—		—		6	0
Lille	2004–05	Ligue 1	19	3	0	0	2	0	6 (Note: Appearances in UEFA Cup)	1	—		27	4
Lille	2005–06	Ligue 1	27	4	0	0	1	0	6 (Note: Four appearances in UEFA Champions League, two in UEFA Cup)	0	—		34	4
Lille	2006–07	Ligue 1	22	1	0	0	1	0	5 (Note: Appearances in UEFA Champions League)	0	—		28	1
Lille	2007–08	Ligue 1	16	0	1	0	1	0	—		—		18	0
Lille	2008–09	Ligue 1	30	0	3	1	1	0	—		—		34	1
Lille	2009–10	Ligue 1	31	1	1	0	1	0	5 (Note: Appearances in UEFA Europa League)	0	—		38	1
Lille	2010–11	Ligue 1	35	2	6	0	2	0	6	0	—		49	2
Lille	2011–12	Ligue 1	32	5	3	0	1	0	6	0	1 (Note: Appearance in Trophée des Champions)	0	43	5
Lille	2012–13	Ligue 1	15	0	0	0	2	0	3	0	—		20	0
Lille	Total		233	16	14	1	12	0	37	1	1	0	297	18
Newcastle United	2012–13	Premier League	14	0	0	0	—		0	0	—		14	0
Newcastle United	2013–14	Premier League	29	1	0	0	3	0	—		—		32	1
Newcastle United	Total		43	1	0	0	3	0	0	0	—		46	1
Arsenal	2014–15	Premier League	10	1	1	0	0	0	3	0	1 (Note: Appearance in FA Community Shield)	0	15	1
Arsenal	2015–16	Premier League	2	0	0	0	2	0	3	0	0	0	7	0
Arsenal	2016–17	Premier League	1	0	0	0	0	0	0	0	—		1	0
Arsenal	2017–18	Premier League	0	0	1	0	2	0	4	1	0	0	7	1
Arsenal	Total		13	1	2	0	4	0	10	1	1	0	30	2
Bordeaux (loan)	2015–16	Ligue 1	9	0	0	0	0	0	—		—		9	0
Saint-Étienne	2017–18	Ligue 1	15	4	0	0	0	0	—		—		15	4
Saint-Étienne	2018–19	Ligue 1	24	4	0	0	0	0	—		—		24	4
Saint-Étienne	2019–20	Ligue 1	21	1	6	1	1	0	4	0	—		32	2
Saint-Étienne	2020–21	Ligue 1	26	2	0	0	—		—		—		26	2
Saint-Étienne	Total		86	11	6	1	1	0	4	0	—		97	12
Valenciennes	2021–22	Ligue 2	29	0	0	0	—		—		—		29	0
Career total			412	29	22	2	20	0	51	2	2	0	507	33

=== International ===
Appearances and goals by national team and year
National team	Year	Apps	Goals
France	2011	2	0
France	2012	11	1
France	2013	5	1
France	2014	8	0
France	2015	1	0
Total		27	2

France score listed first, score column indicates score after each Debuchy goal

List of international goals scored by Mathieu Debuchy
No.	Date	Venue	Opponent	Score	Result	Competition
1	27 May 2012	Stade du Hainaut, Valenciennes, France	Iceland	1–2	3–2	Friendly
2	11 October 2013	Parc des Princes, Paris, France	Australia	5–0	6–0	Friendly

== Honours ==
Lille

- Ligue 1: 2010–11
- Coupe de France: 2010–11

Arsenal

- FA Community Shield: 2014, 2015

Saint-Étienne

- Coupe de France runner-up: 2019–20

Individual

- UNFP Ligue 1 Team of the Year: 2011–12
- UNFP Ligue 1 Player of the Month: February 2018
