= Simon Cara =

French footballer (born 2005)

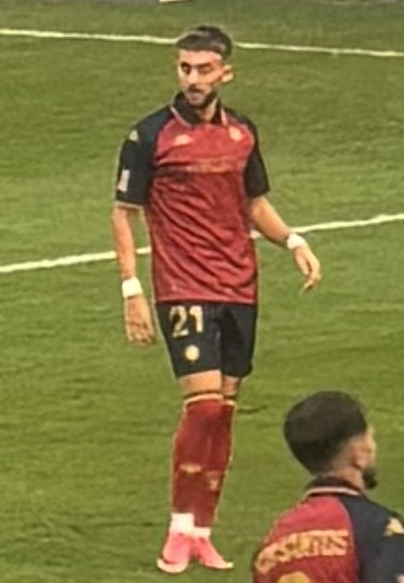
- Cara with Versailles in 2026

Personal information
- Date of birth: 31 March 2005 (age 21)
- Place of birth: Montpellier, France
- Height: 1.82 m (6 ft 0 in)
- Position: Forward

Team information
- Current team: Versailles
- Number: 21

Youth career
- 2010–2016: US Saint-Martin-de-Londres
- 2016–2018: Entente Saint Clément-Montferrier
- 2018–2023: Montpellier

Senior career*
Years	Team	Apps	(Gls)
2022–2025	Montpellier B	39	(12)
2025	Montpellier	2	(0)
2025–2026	Istres	26	(8)
2026–	Versailles	2	(0)
- * Club domestic league appearances and goals as of 11:49, 15 August 2026 (UTC)

Simon Cara (born 31 March 2005) is a French professional footballer who plays as a forward for Ligue 3 club Versailles.

== Career ==
Born in Montpellier, Cara joined his hometown club Montpellier's under-14 side in 2018. On 28 September 2024, he made his first appearance in a first team squad for a match away to Monaco. On 8 December 2024, as the captain of Montpellier's reserve side in the Championnat National 3, Cara scored a second-half hat-trick in a 5–1 victory over Alès. On 3 March 2025, he made his professional debut in Ligue 1 as a late-match substitute in a 4–0 home defeat to Rennes.

On 5 August 2025, Cara signed for Championnat National 2 club Istres. In May 2026, it was announced he had signed with Ligue 3 club Versailles on a two-year contract.
