= Ilyes Hamache =

French footballer (born 2003)

Personal information
- Date of birth: 11 February 2003 (age 23)
- Place of birth: Lille, France
- Height: 1.78 m (5 ft 10 in)
- Position: Winger

Team information
- Current team: Cambuur

Youth career
- 2008–2012: JS Lille Wazemmes
- 2012–2015: IC Lambersart
- 2016–2017: Wasquehal Football
- 2018: Mouvaux FC
- 2019–2020: Wasquehal Football
- 2020–2021: Valenciennes

Senior career*
Years	Team	Apps	(Gls)
2021–2024	Valenciennes	82	(9)
2024–2026	Schalke 04	11	(0)
2024	Schalke 04 II	1	(0)
2025–2026	→ Amiens (loan)	28	(3)
2026–	Cambuur	0	(0)

International career
2022	France U20	1	(0)
- * Club domestic league appearances and goals as of 30 June 2026

Ilyes Hamache (born 11 February 2003) is a French professional footballer who plays as a winger for Eredivisie club Cambuur.

== Club career ==
=== Valenciennes ===
Hamache made his professional debut with Valenciennes in a 2–1 Ligue 2 win over Bastia on 21 September 2021. He scored his first goal for the club in a 3–1 loss to Dunkerque on 16 October 2021. On 30 January 2022, he signed his first professional contract with the club, keeping him until 2025.

=== Schalke 04 ===
On 20 August 2024, German club Schalke 04 announced that they had signed Hamache until 30 June 2028.

==== Loan to Amiens ====
On 1 September 2025, he was loaned to Ligue 2 club Amiens for the 2025–26 season, with an option to buy.

=== Cambuur ===
On 25 June 2026, Hamache moved to Dutch club Cambuur.

== International career ==
Hamache represented France U20s in 2022.

== Personal life ==
Hamache is of Algerian descent with roots from Ighil Ouantar, a small village in Béjaïa.

== Career statistics ==
As of 19 May 2026

Appearances and goals by club, season and competition
Club	Season	League			Cup		Total	
Club	Season	Division	Apps	Goals	Apps	Goals	Apps	Goals
Valenciennes	2021–22	Ligue 2	22	4	3	2	25	6
Valenciennes	2022–23	Ligue 2	32	3	1	0	33	3
Valenciennes	2023–24	Ligue 2	28	2	6	0	34	2
Valenciennes	Total		82	9	10	2	92	11
Schalke 04	2024–25	2. Bundesliga	11	0	0	0	11	0
Schalke 04 II	2024–25	Regionalliga West	1	0	—		1	0
Amiens (loan)	2025–26	Ligue 2	28	3	4	3	32	6
Career total			122	12	14	4	136	17
