= Aeron Zinga =

French footballer (born 2000)

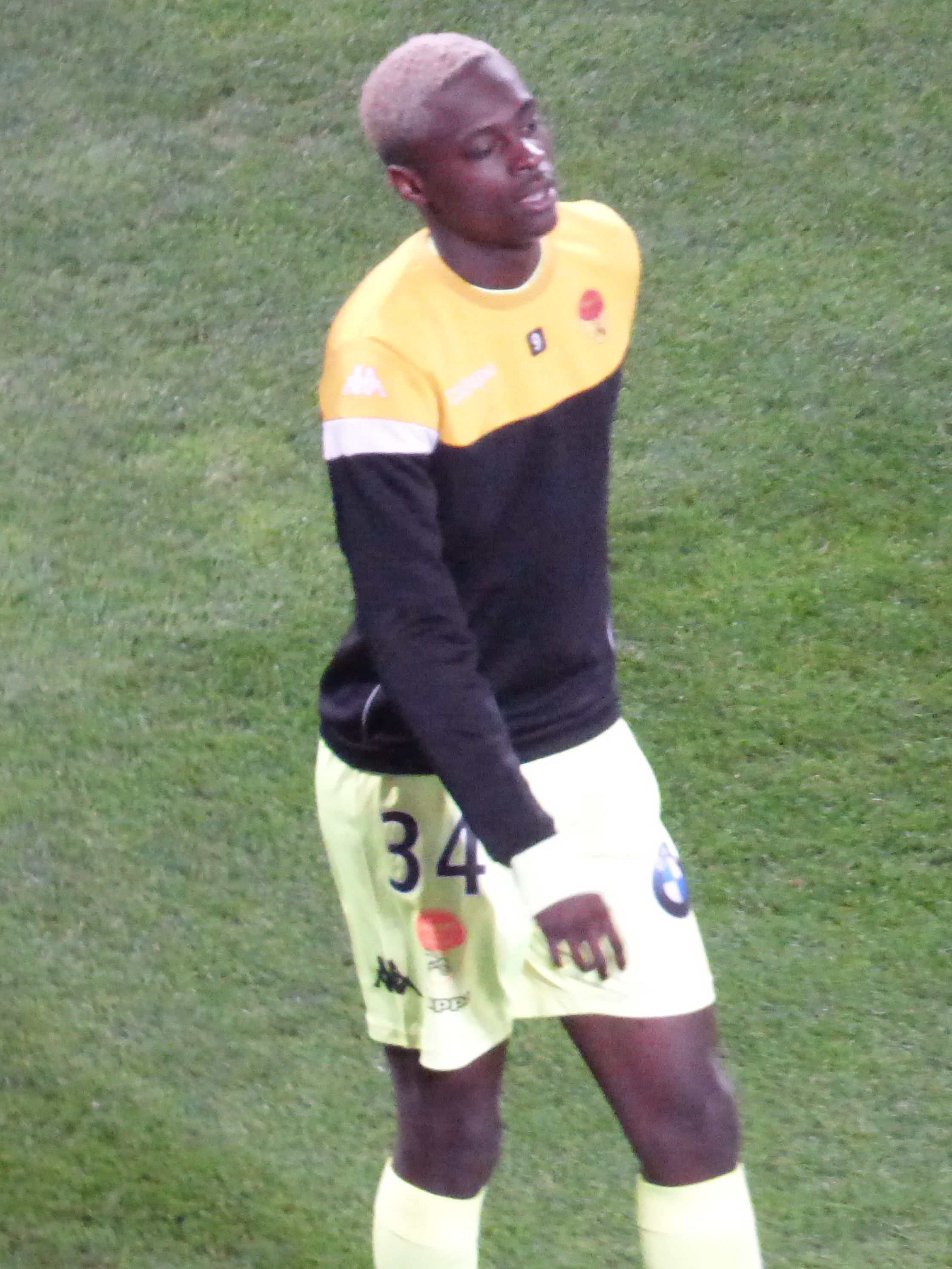
- Zinga with Orléans in 2020

Personal information
- Date of birth: 15 July 2000 (age 26)
- Place of birth: Massy, France
- Height: 1.92 m (6 ft 4 in)
- Position: Forward

Youth career
- –2018: Drancy
- 2018–2019: Orléans

Senior career*
Years	Team	Apps	(Gls)
2019–2020	Orléans B	17	(6)
2020	Orléans	2	(0)
2020–2021	Strasbourg B	5	(3)
2021–2022	Valenciennes B	18	(10)
2021–2023	Valenciennes	27	(1)
2023–2024	CSKA 1948	2	(0)
2023–2024	CSKA 1948 II	4	(1)
2024–2025	SAS Épinal	26	(12)
2025–2026	Paris 13 Atletico	13	(2)
2026	Quevilly-Rouen	7	(0)
- * Club domestic league appearances and goals as of 23 June 2026

Aeron Zinga (born 15 July 2000) is a French professional footballer who plays as a forward.

== Career ==
Zinga made his professional debut with Orléans in a 2–0 Ligue 2 loss to Troyes on 28 February 2020.

On 9 September 2023 he moved away from France to sign with the Bulgarian First League team CSKA 1948.

== Personal life ==
Born in France, Zinga is of Congolese descent.
