= FC Versailles 78 =

Football club based in Versailles, France

Versailles
- Full name: Football Club de Versailles 78
- Nickname: Les Bleus (The Blues)
- Short name: FCV
- Founded: 1929; 97 years ago
- Ground: Stade Georges Lefèvre (league); Stade Montbauron
- Capacity: 2,164 (Stade Georges Lefèvre); 7,545 (Stade Montbauron)
- President: Anthony Perrat
- Manager: Jordan Gonzalez
- League: Ligue 3
- 2025–26: Championnat National, 5th of 17
- Website: fcversailles.com
| Home colours | Away colours |

Football Club de Versailles 78 (French: [futbol klœb də vɛʁsaj swasɑ̃(t)diz‿ɥit]), also known as FC Versailles, Versailles or simply FCV, is a French professional association football club based in the commune of Versailles, Yvelines. The club was formed in 1989 as the result of a merger between Racing Club Versailles and Companion Sports Versailles. The club's home stadium is the Stade Montbauron in Versailles, although the first team has been playing its Ligue 3 home games at the Stade Georges Lefèvre in nearby Saint-Germain-en-Laye since 2025.

The club won promotion from the 2021–22 Championnat National 2 and now plays in Ligue 3, the third tier of the French football league system. The club is an official academy of the French Football Federation. Since 2024, the club has been partially owned by French Formula One driver Pierre Gasly.

== History ==
FC Versailles was formed in 1989 as the result of a merger between Racing Club Versailles and Companion Sports Versailles. The new club took Racing Club Versailles' place in Division 3 and were placed in the North section. FC Versailles' first season was not successful as they finished 14th, amassing 24 points from 30 matches, and were relegated from the division. Competing in Division 4, they achieved two successive eighth-placed finishes before a sixth-placed finish in the 1992–93 season. In the summer of 1993, Versailles were one of the clubs accepted into the newly formed National 3. They ended the season with 40 points, finishing as runners-up behind Le Mans B.

Versailles struggled in the National 2 and were relegated after one season after finishing 17th in the table. The team returned to the National 3 and achieved a couple of mid-table positions in the following two seasons. Versailles qualified for the Championnat de France Amateur 2 Group B in the 1997–98 campaign and finished 13th in their inaugural season. The following year, Versailles were moved to Group H and the side finished 15th out of 16 teams in the division, thereby suffering relegation to the Division d'Honneur Paris Île-de-France. Versailles remained in the same division for the next six seasons, achieving a highest finish of third place in the 2000–01 campaign. In the 2004–05 season the team again suffered relegation after finishing bottom of the division with 46 points from 26 matches. Versailles have played in the DSR Paris Île-de-France since the 2005–06 season. In the 2009–10 campaign, Versailles reached the Ninth Round of the Coupe de France before losing to Beauvais. Versailles caused an upset by defeating Ligue 2 club Dijon in the Eighth Round.

On 29 January 2022, Versailles eliminated Ligue 2 side Toulouse in the round of 16 of the Coupe de France following a 1–0 win, and went on to qualify for the semi-finals after beating Bergerac in a penalty shoot-out. Versailles was eventually defeated 2–0 by Nice in the semi-finals. Later in the 2021–22 season, Versailles secured promotion to the Championnat National.

== Teams ==
As of February 2010, FC Versailles has a total of 750 registered players in a total of 26 senior and junior teams. As of the 2009–10 season, the first team plays in the Division Supériore Régionale Paris Île-de-France Group A. Other senior teams play in local leagues around the Paris region. The club is renowned for having successful youth teams, and it has been named as an official training centre for the French Football Federation (FFF) since 2007. Players who have previously played for Versailles include Thierry Henry, Hatem Ben Arfa, Charles Itandje, and Jérôme Rothen.

== Stadium ==
FC Versailles' main stadium is the Stade de Montbauron in Versailles. The stadium has a capacity of 6,208 spectators. The ground is typical of many continental European stadia with limited roofing and an athletics track around the perimeter of the playing field. At two sides of the ground there are stands with seating while the rest of the stadium has terracing for standing spectators. There is also an annexed pitch with an artificial playing surface which is used predominantly for reserve matches and the football academy.

From August 2022 to January 2025, Versailles hosted their home matches in the Championnat National at the Stade Jean-Bouin in Paris, which they were renting for €30,000 per match. They were forced to relocate to the Stade Walter-Luzi in Chambly for the rest of the 2024–25 season. In July 2025, it was confirmed that the club would play at the Stade Georges Lefèvre for the 2025–26 Championnat National season.

== Current squad ==
As of 7 September 2026.

Note: Flags indicate national team as defined under FIFA eligibility rules; some limited exceptions apply. Players may hold more than one non-FIFA nationality.

| No. | Pos. | Nation | Player |
|---|---|---|---|
| 1 | GK | GLP | Rubens Adélaïde |
| 2 | DF | FRA | Jérémi Santini |
| 3 | DF | FRA | Djibril Khouma |
| 4 | DF | TOG | Kurtis Chadet |
| 5 | DF | FRA | Raphaël Calvet |
| 6 | MF | FRA | Emric Goumot |
| 7 | FW | HAI | Shelton Guillaume |
| 8 | MF | FRA | Alexis dos Santos |
| 9 | FW | CGO | Cédric Odzoumo |
| 10 | FW | FRA | Jawed Kalai |
| 11 | FW | FRA | Artur Zakharyan |
| 12 | DF | FRA | Mathias Fischer |
| 13 | DF | CIV | Ange Badey |

| No. | Pos. | Nation | Player |
|---|---|---|---|
| 14 | MF | FRA | Romain Basque |
| 15 | DF | GUI | Abdourahmane Barry |
| 17 | FW | FRA | Alexis Kabamba |
| 18 | MF | GLP | Jordan Leborgne |
| 19 | DF | FRA | Bilal Cissé |
| 20 | MF | MAR | Ismaël Aouad |
| 21 | MF | FRA | Simon Cara |
| 23 | DF | CMR | Ryan Tchato |
| 24 | MF | FRA | Ali Ouchen |
| 25 | DF | BEN | Deen Adehoumi |
| 27 | FW | FRA | Amir Etien |
| 30 | GK | FRA | Nathan Yavorsky |

== Honours ==
- National 2 (1)
  - Champions: 2021–22
- Division 4 (1):
  - Finalist: 1986
  - Champions of group F: 1986
- National 3 (1)
  - Champions: 2019–20
  - Runners-up of group B: 1994
- Coupe de France (0)
  - Best finish: Semi-final : 2022
- Division d'Honneur (2)
  - Champions: 1985, 2017
- Division Supérieure Régionale (1)
  - Champions of group A: 2010
- Division d'Honneur Régionale (0):
  - Runners-up of group A: 2009
