= Naim Van Attenhoven =

Footballer (born 2003)

Personal information
- Full name: Naïm-Nhour Jan Van Attenhoven
- Date of birth: 31 January 2003 (age 23)
- Place of birth: Brussels, Belgium
- Height: 1.86 m (6 ft 1 in)
- Position: Goalkeeper

Team information
- Current team: Crossing Schaerbeek

Youth career
- Brussels
- Mechelen
- 2013–2014: PSV
- 2014–2016: OH Leuven
- 2016–2019: Charleroi
- 2019–2020: Standard Liège
- 2020: → Charleroi (loan)
- 2020–2021: Anderlecht

Senior career*
| Years | Team | Apps | (Gls) |
| 2022–2023 | Ninove | 7 | (0) |
| 2023–2024 | Valenciennes B | 8 | (0) |
| 2024–2025 | Union Namur | 1 | (0) |
| 2025– | Crossing Schaerbeek | 0 | (0) |

International career^{‡}
| 2018 | Belgium U16 | 1 | (0) |
| 2020 | Belgium U17 | 2 | (0) |
| 2021 | Niger U20 | 3 | (0) |
| 2023 | Niger U23 | 3 | (0) |
| 2021– | Niger | 10 | (0) |
- * Club domestic league appearances and goals as of 11 August 2025 ‡ National team caps and goals as of 17 October 2023

Naïm-Nhour Jan Van Attenhoven (born 31 January 2003) is a professional footballer who plays as a goalkeeper for Belgian National Division 1 club Crossing Schaerbeek and the Niger national team. Born in Belgium, he represented them at youth level before switching his allegiance to Niger.

== Club career ==
Van Attenhoven is a former youth team player of several Belgian clubs and Dutch club PSV. In May 2020, he joined the youth academy of Anderlecht. In January 2022, his contract with the club was terminated as per mutual agreement.

After spending six months as a free agent, Van Attenhoven joined newly promoted Belgian National Division 1 club Ninove in July 2022.

== International career ==
Van Attenhoven is eligible to represent both Belgium and Niger at international level. He is a former Belgian youth international and has played in friendlies for the Belgium under-17 team.

In March 2021, Van Attenhoven received his maiden call-up to the Niger national team for Africa Cup of Nations qualification matches against Ivory Coast and Madagascar. He made his senior team debut on 9 June 2021 in a 1–0 friendly defeat against Congo. He also played for the Niger under-20 team at the 2021 Arab Cup U-20 the same month.

== Personal life ==
Van Attenhoven was born in Belgium to a Belgian father and a Nigerien mother. He is the nephew of former Nigerien international footballer Ibrahim Tankary.

== Career statistics ==
=== International ===
As of match played 17 October 2023

Appearances and goals by national team and year
| National team | Year | Apps | Goals |
|---|---|---|---|
| Niger | 2021 | 4 | 0 |
| Niger | 2022 | 4 | 0 |
| Niger | 2023 | 2 | 0 |
| Niger | 2024 | 0 | 0 |
| Total | | 10 | 0 |
