= Stade Nungesser =

Defunct multi-purpose stadium in Valenciennes, France

- L'Enfer du Nord
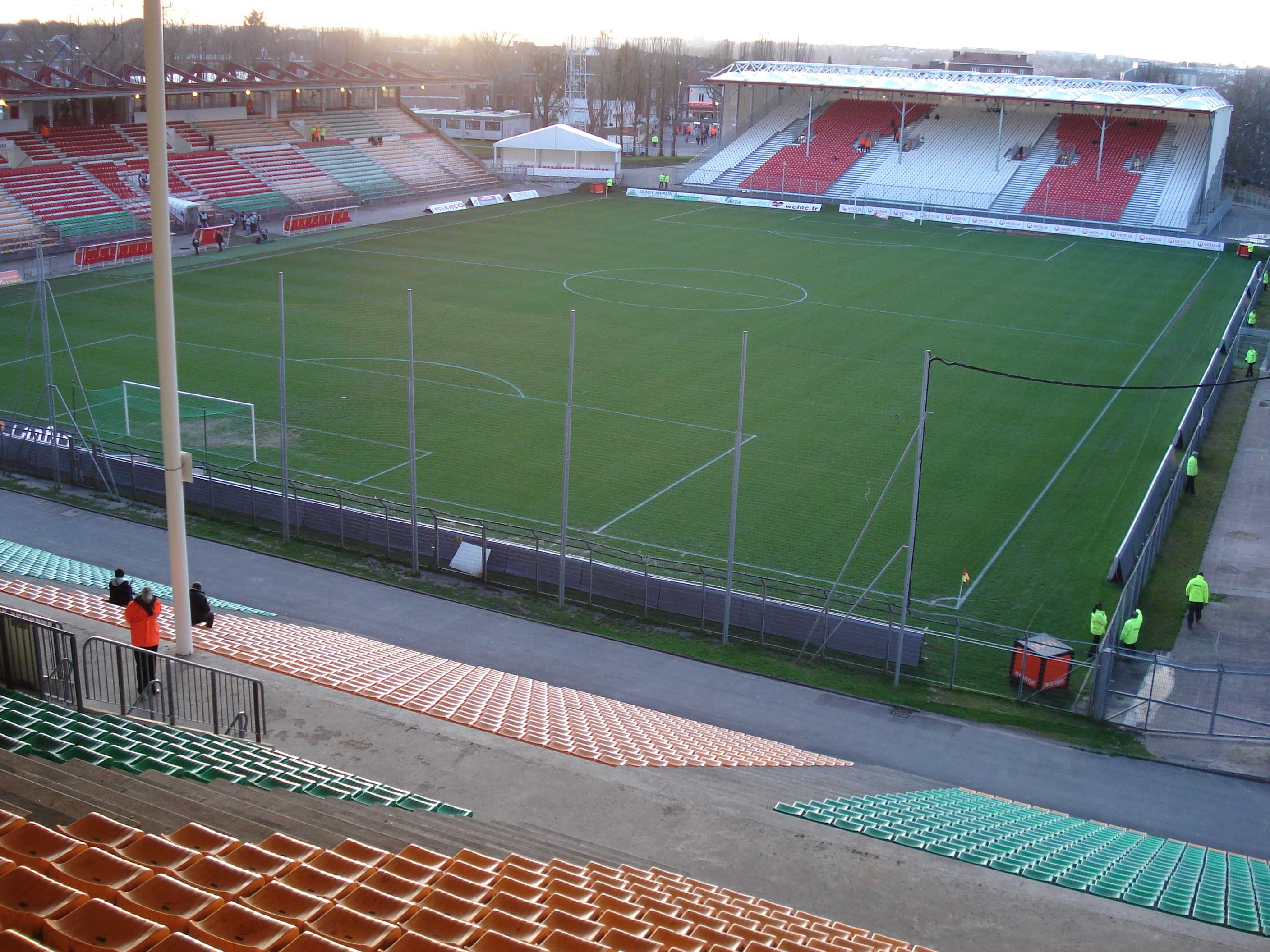
- Structural view of Stade Nungesser prior to demolition
- Interactive map of Stade Nungesser
- Address: 43 bis, Avenue de Reims; France
- Location: Valenciennes, Nord
- Coordinates: 50°20′56″N 3°31′37″E
- Owner: Valenciennes Métropole
- Operator: Valenciennes Métropole
- Capacity: 16,457 (final); 21,500 (1953 peak)
- Surface: Natural grass
- Record attendance: 21,268 (v. CS Sedan Ardennes, 13 March 1955)

Construction
- Opened: 28 April 1929
- Closed: 26 July 2011
- Demolished: 2012

Tenant
- Valenciennes FC (1929–2011)

Stade Nungesser was a multi-purpose stadium located in the municipal quarter of the same name within Valenciennes, France. For over eighty years, the venue operated primarily as the home ground for the professional football club Valenciennes FC (VAFC), hosting domestic league matches, cup fixtures, and regional athletic competitions. The stadium was named in honor of the celebrated French aviation pioneer and World War I fighter ace Charles Nungesser, who was born in Valenciennes. Facing modernization challenges and structural obsolescence, the venue was formally decommissioned in July 2011 and replaced by the adjacent, newly constructed Stade du Hainaut, with the historic facility undergoing complete demolition.

== History and development ==
The venue officially opened its gates on 28 April 1929, welcoming local sports clubs and establishing its tenure as the principal base for Valenciennes FC, who took up permanent residency at the grounds ahead of the 1930 competitive season. Constructed with a modest initial layout, the stadium saw successive architectural modifications to keep pace with the club's alternating promotions between Ligue 1 and Ligue 2. Major grandstand extensions and modernization overhauls were executed in 1955, 1992, and 2006 to scale structural capacities, manage changing safety regulations, and accommodate expanding fanbases during peak operational eras.

The configuration of the stadium featured four distinct main grandstands known locally as the Tribune Pouille (East), Tribune Honneur (South), Tribune de Fer (North), and the Tribune Ouest (West). The venue achieved its historic record attendance on 13 March 1955, when 21,268 spectators packed into the stands for a highly anticipated fixture against CS Sedan Ardennes. Despite its beloved status among local supporters, who affectionately referred to the compact, intimidating atmosphere as part of the northern football heritage, the facility eventually became obsolete for elite French football standards due to deteriorating steel infrastructure and restrictive hospitality amenities.

== Decommissioning and legacy ==
The final official professional football match played on the pitch took place at the conclusion of the 2010–2011 domestic season, concluding decades of athletic history on the site. On 26 July 2011, Valenciennes FC officially transferred its operations to the 25,172-seat Stade du Hainaut, leaving Stade Nungesser permanently vacant. Following the relocation, salvage operations and systematic demolition of the grandstands commenced, wrapping up entirely by the end of 2012. The footprint of the former stadium was initially converted into green community park spaces collocated with the new stadium complex, before a portion of the historic grounds was repurposed to construct a state-of-the-art municipal aquatics center, which held its grand opening on 6 February 2020.

== See also ==
- List of football stadiums in France
