= Gaëtan Robail =

French footballer (born 1994)

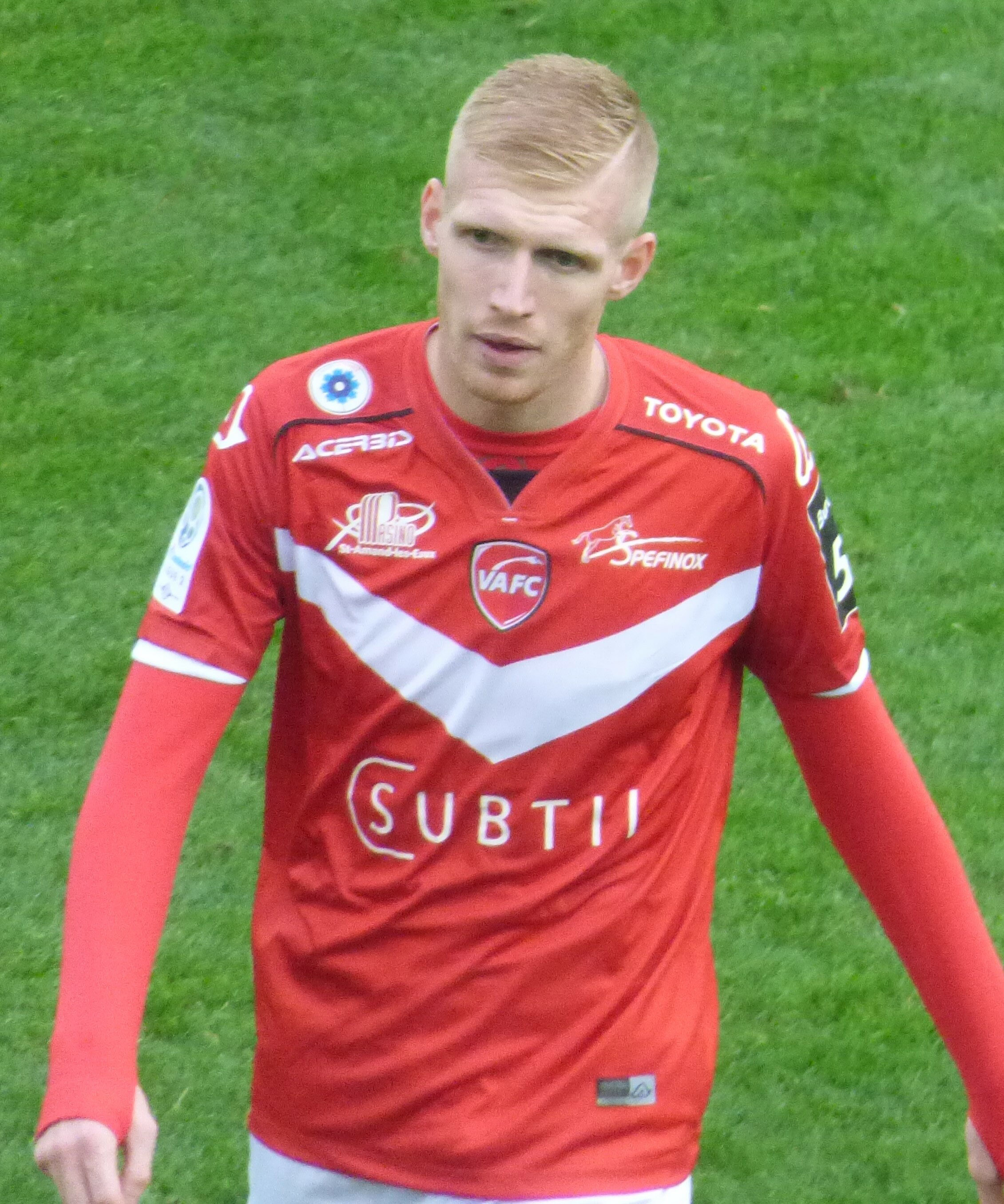
- Robail with Valenciennes in 2018

Personal information
- Date of birth: 9 January 1994 (age 32)
- Place of birth: Saint-Pol-sur-Ternoise, France
- Height: 1.81 m (5 ft 11 in)
- Position: Left winger

Team information
- Current team: Dunkerque
- Number: 9

Youth career
- –2013: Arras

Senior career*
Years	Team	Apps	(Gls)
2013–2016	Arras	89	(26)
2016–2017	Paris Saint-Germain B	20	(8)
2017–2019	Paris Saint-Germain	0	(0)
2017–2018	→ Cercle Brugge (loan)	7	(0)
2018–2019	→ Valenciennes (loan)	44	(17)
2019–2022	Lens	27	(7)
2020–2021	→ Guingamp (loan)	9	(0)
2021–2022	→ Valenciennes (loan)	47	(4)
2022–2024	Atromitos	56	(9)
2024–2026	RWD Molenbeek	32	(12)
2026–	Dunkerque	0	(0)
- * Club domestic league appearances and goals as of 20 April 2026

Gaëtan Robail (born 9 January 1994) is a French professional footballer who plays as a left winger for Ligue 2 club Dunkerque.

== Career ==
On 5 October 2020, Robail joined Guingamp on a season-long loan from Lens. On 12 January 2021, Robail moved to Valenciennes on 18-month loan deal with an option to sign permanently.

On 22 July 2022, Robail signed a two-year contract with Atromitos in Greece.

On 3 July 2024, Robail signed for Challenger Pro League club RWD Molenbeek.

== Career statistics ==
As of 9 July 2021

Appearances and goals by club, season and competition
Club	Season	League			National Cup		League Cup		Other		Total	
Club	Season	Division	Apps	Goals	Apps	Goals	Apps	Goals	Apps	Goals	Apps	Goals
Arras	2012–13	CFA 2	10	3	0	0	0	0	0	0	10	3
Arras	2013–14	CFA 2	24	9	0	0	1	0	0	0	25	9
Arras	2014–15	CFA	25	8	0	0	0	0	0	0	25	8
Arras	2015–16	CFA	30	6	0	0	0	0	0	0	30	6
Arras	Total		89	26	0	0	1	0	0	0	90	26
Paris Saint-Germain B	2016–17	CFA	20	8	0	0	0	0	0	0	20	8
Paris Saint-Germain B	2017–18	National 2	0	0	0	0	0	0	0	0	0	0
Paris Saint-Germain B	Total		20	8	0	0	0	0	0	0	20	8
Cercle Brugge (loan)	2017–18	First Division B	7	0	1	0	0	0	0	0	8	0
Valenciennes (loan)	2017–18	Ligue 2	14	7	0	0	0	0	0	0	14	7
Valenciennes (loan)	2018–19	Ligue 2	21	7	1	1	1	0	0	0	23	8
Valenciennes (loan)	Total		35	14	1	1	1	0	0	0	37	15
Lens	2019–20	Ligue 2	24	7	1	0	2	0	0	0	27	7
Guingamp (loan)	2020–21	Ligue 2	9	0	0	0	0	0	0	0	14	7
Valenciennes (loan)	2020–21	Ligue 2	14	0	3	0	0	0	0	0	17	0
Career total			198	55	6	1	4	0	0	0	213	56
