= Yacine El Amri =

French footballer (born 2004)

Personal information
- Date of birth: 22 July 2004 (age 22)
- Place of birth: Château-Thierry, France
- Height: 1.80 m (5 ft 11 in)
- Position: Winger

Team information
- Current team: Rachad Bernoussi

Youth career
- CTEFC
- 2019–2022: Valenciennes

Senior career*
Years	Team	Apps	(Gls)
2022–2025	Valenciennes II	50	(6)
2022–2025	Valenciennes	10	(0)
2025–	Rachad Bernoussi	0	(0)

International career^{‡}
2020	Morocco U17	2	(0)
- * Club domestic league appearances and goals as of 5 September 2025 ‡ National team caps and goals as of 04:55, 12 October 2022 (UTC)

Yacine El Amri (born 22 July 2004) is a professional footballer who plays as a winger for Moroccan club Rachad Bernoussi. Born in France, he is a youth international for Morocco.

== Professional career ==
El Amri is a youth product of CTEFC, and moved to Valenciennes's youth side on 27 April 2019. On 30 May 2020, he signed his first professional contract with Valenciennes until June 2023. He made his professional debut and Ligue 2 debut with Valenciennes as an early substitute in a 1–0 win over Le Havre on 6 August 2022.

== International career ==
El Amri is born in France to a Moroccan father and a French mother. He was called up to the Morocco U17s for a set of friendlies in October 2020. He was called to the Morocco U20s in November 2021 for a training camp.
