= Noah Diliberto =

French professional footballer (born 2001)

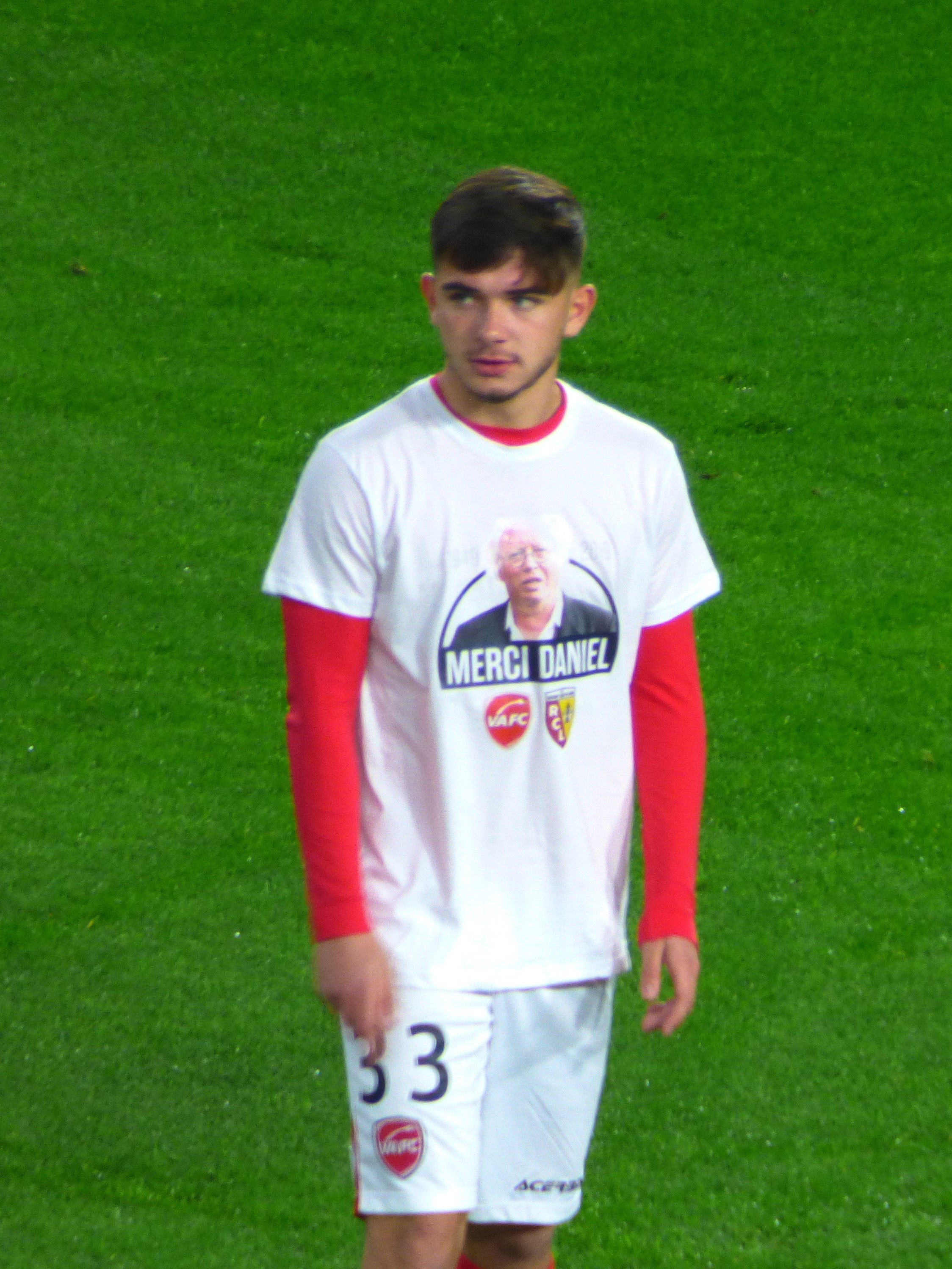
- Diliberto in 2019

Personal information
- Date of birth: 8 September 2001 (age 25)
- Place of birth: Cambrai, France
- Height: 1.75 m (5 ft 9 in)
- Position: Midfielder

Team information
- Current team: Francs Borains
- Number: 33

Senior career*
Years	Team	Apps	(Gls)
2019–2023	Valenciennes II	8	(0)
2019–2023	Valenciennes	95	(4)
2023–2024	Lens II	7	(1)
2024–2025	Widzew Łódź	12	(1)
2025–	Francs Borains	26	(0)
- * Club domestic league appearances and goals as of 20 April 2026

Noah Diliberto (born 8 September 2001) is a French professional footballer who plays as a midfielder for Challenger Pro League club Francs Borains.

== Career ==
Diliberto made his professional debut with Valenciennes in a 1–0 Ligue 2 win over Orléans on 22 November 2019.

On 4 October 2023, Diliberto signed with Lens and was assigned to their reserve team in the fifth-tier Championnat National 3.

On 27 January 2024, Diliberto moved abroad to sign a two-and-a-half-year contract with Polish Ekstraklasa side Widzew Łódź. He scored once in 15 appearances for Widzew before leaving by mutual consent on 25 July 2025.

On 28 July 2025, Diliberto joined Belgian side Francs Borains.
