= Quentin Lecoeuche =

French footballer (born 1994)

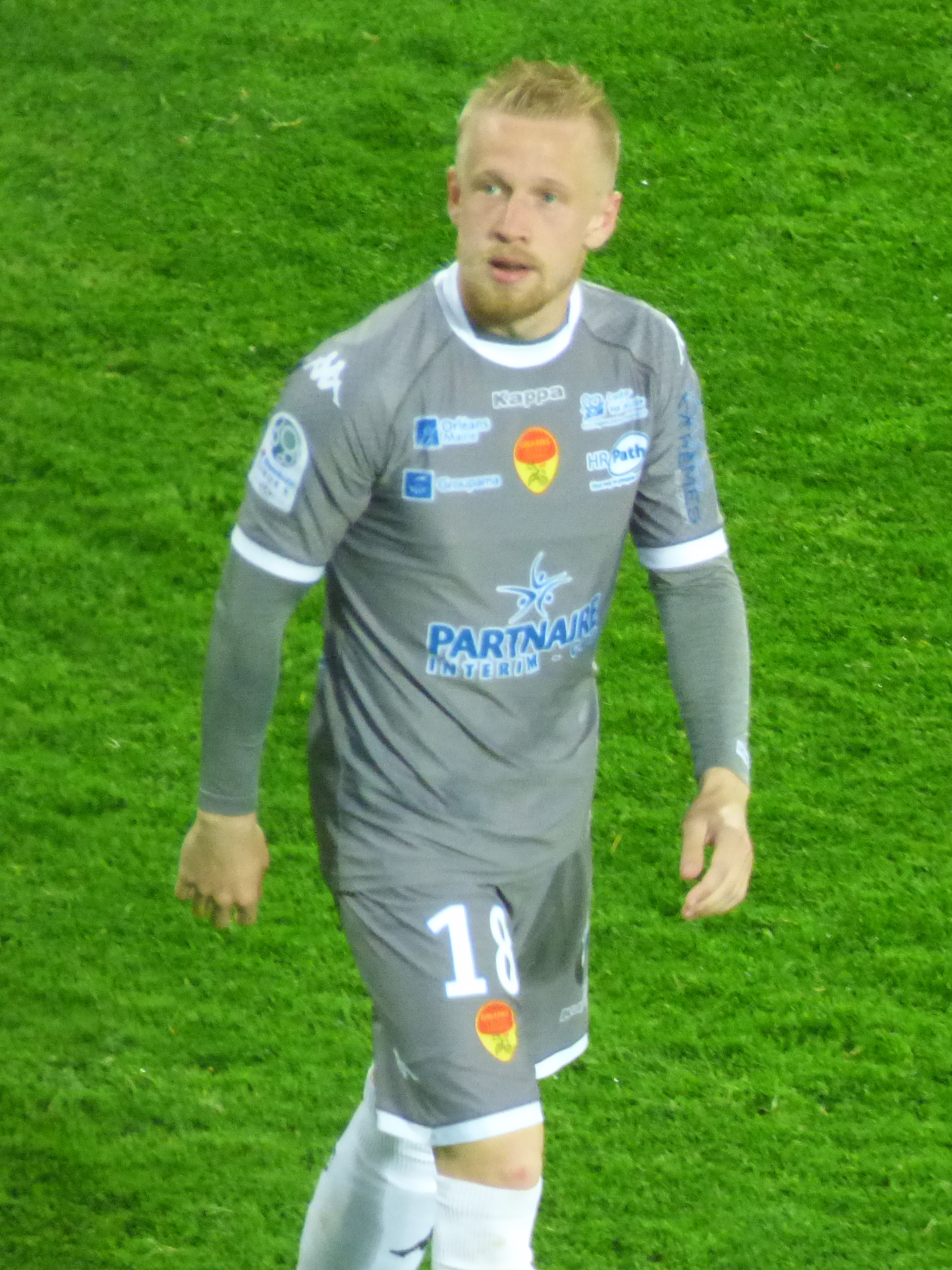
- Lecoeuche playing for Orléans in 2019

Personal information
- Date of birth: 4 February 1994 (age 32)
- Place of birth: Beuvry, France
- Height: 1.72 m (5 ft 8 in)
- Position: Left-back

Team information
- Current team: Volos
- Number: 13

Youth career
- 1998–2002: La Gorgue
- 2002–2013: Lens

Senior career*
Years	Team	Apps	(Gls)
2013–2015	Lens B	40	(2)
2015	Lens	2	(0)
2015–2016	Luçon	16	(0)
2016–2018	Lorient B	28	(1)
2018–2021	Lorient	12	(0)
2018–2019	→ Orléans (loan)	27	(2)
2020–2021	→ Ajaccio (loan)	13	(0)
2021–2023	Valenciennes	58	(0)
2023–2024	Zaragoza	26	(0)
2024–2025	Caen	21	(0)
2025–2026	Wisła Płock	28	(0)
2026–	Volos	0	(0)
- * Club domestic league appearances and goals as of 17:58, 29 May 2026 (UTC)

Quentin Lecoeuche (French: [kɑ̃tɛ̃ ləkœʃ]; born 4 February 1994) is a French professional footballer who plays as a left back for Super League Greece club Volos.

== Club career ==
Lecoeuche is a youth exponent from RC Lens. He made his Ligue 1 debut on 26 April 2015 against AS Monaco replacing Wylan Cyprien after 74 minutes in a 3–0 home defeat.

After Luçon's bankruptcy, he signed a two-year contract with FC Lorient on 4 August 2016 to play with the B team.

On 17 July 2020, Lecoeuche joined AC Ajaccio on a season-long loan deal.

On 1 September 2021, he joined Valenciennes on a two-year contract. On 3 July 2023, he joined Real Zaragoza of the Spanish Segunda División.
