= Mathis Picouleau =

French footballer (born 2000)

Personal information
- Full name: Mathis Christophe Picouleau
- Date of birth: 8 May 2000 (age 26)
- Place of birth: Rennes, France
- Height: 1.71 m (5 ft 7 in)
- Position: Midfielder

Team information
- Current team: Concarneau
- Number: 8

Youth career
- 2006–2009: Le Rheu
- 2009–2018: Rennes

Senior career*
Years	Team	Apps	(Gls)
2018–2020	Rennes II	31	(2)
2020–2023	Valenciennes	73	(3)
2022–2023	Valenciennes II	5	(0)
2023–2025	Nîmes	61	(6)
2025–	Concarneau	31	(2)

International career
2015–2016	France U16	10	(0)
2016–2017	France U17	10	(2)
2017–2018	France U18	7	(0)
2018–2019	France U19	6	(0)
2019	France U20	2	(0)
- * Club domestic league appearances and goals as of 23 June 2026

Mathis Christophe Picouleau (born 8 May 2000) is a French professional footballer who plays as a midfielder for Ligue 3 club Concarneau.

== Career ==
On 7 June 2020, Picouleau signed this first professional contract with Valenciennes. Picouleau made his professional debut with Valenciennes in a 1–0 Ligue 2 loss to Paris FC on 29 August 2020.

On 27 July 2023, Picouleau moved to Nîmes on a two-year contract. On 10 June 2025, he signed for Concarneau.
