= Aymen Boutoutaou =

Footballer (born 2001)

Personal information
- Date of birth: 18 February 2001 (age 25)
- Place of birth: Lille, France
- Height: 1.74 m (5 ft 9 in)
- Positions: Winger; attacking midfielder

Team information
- Current team: FCSB
- Number: 28

Youth career
- 2006–2012: ES Mouvalloise
- 2012: IC Croix
- 2012–2014: UF Lambersart
- 2014–2020: Valenciennes

Senior career*
| Years | Team | Apps | (Gls) |
| 2019–2025 | Valenciennes B | 16 | (4) |
| 2019–2025 | Valenciennes | 115 | (15) |
| 2025–2026 | Sochaux | 32 | (9) |
| 2026– | FCSB | 12 | (2) |

International career
| 2022 | Algeria U23 | 1 | (1) |
- * Club domestic league appearances and goals as of 22 November 2026

Aymen Boutoutaou (Arabic: أيمن بوتوتائو; born 18 February 2001) is a professional footballer who plays as winger or an attacking midfielder for Liga I club FCSB. Born in France, he played for the Algeria national under-23 team.

== Club career ==
Boutoutaou made his professional debut in a 1–0 Ligue 2 win over Paris FC on 13 December 2019. On 10 February 2020, he signed his first professional contract with the club, tying him until June 2023.

== International career ==
Boutoutaou was born in France to an Algerian father and a Moroccan mother. He was called up to the Algeria U23s for friendly matches in May 2022.

== Career statistics ==
As of match played 22 November 2026

Appearances and goals by club, season and competition
| Club | Season | League | | | National cup (Note: Includes Coupe de France, Cupa României) | | Europe | | Other | | Total | |
| Club | Season | Division | Apps | Goals | Apps | Goals | Apps | Goals | Apps | Goals | Apps | Goals |
|---|---|---|---|---|---|---|---|---|---|---|---|---|
| Valenciennes B | 2019–20 | Championnat National 3 | 9 | 2 | — | | — | | — | | 9 | 2 |
| Valenciennes B | 2021–22 | Championnat National 3 | 1 | 0 | — | | — | | — | | 1 | 0 |
| Valenciennes B | 2022–23 | Championnat National 3 | 3 | 0 | — | | — | | — | | 3 | 0 |
| Valenciennes B | 2023–24 | Championnat National 3 | 2 | 2 | — | | — | | — | | 2 | 2 |
| Valenciennes B | 2024–25 | Championnat National 3 | 1 | 0 | — | | — | | — | | 1 | 0 |
| Valenciennes B | Total | | 16 | 4 | — | | — | | — | | 16 | 4 |
| Valenciennes | 2019–20 | Ligue 2 | 3 | 0 | 2 | 1 | — | | — | | 4 | 1 |
| Valenciennes | 2020–21 | Ligue 2 | 16 | 3 | 2 | 0 | — | | — | | 18 | 3 |
| Valenciennes | 2021–22 | Ligue 2 | 17 | 1 | 0 | 0 | — | | — | | 17 | 1 |
| Valenciennes | 2022–23 | Ligue 2 | 30 | 4 | 2 | 0 | — | | — | | 32 | 4 |
| Valenciennes | 2023–24 | Ligue 2 | 26 | 4 | 3 | 0 | — | | — | | 29 | 4 |
| Valenciennes | 2024–25 | Championnat National | 23 | 3 | 4 | 1 | — | | — | | 27 | 4 |
| Valenciennes | Total | | 115 | 15 | 13 | 2 | — | | — | | 128 | 17 |
| Sochaux | 2025–26 | Championnat National | 32 | 9 | 5 | 4 | — | | — | | 37 | 13 |
| FCSB | 2026–27 | Liga I | 12 | 2 | 2 | 1 | 2 (Note: Appearances in UEFA Conference League) | 1 | — | | 16 | 4 |
| Career total | | | 175 | 30 | 20 | 7 | 2 | 1 | — | | 197 | 38 |
