= Allan Linguet =

French footballer (born 1999)

Personal information
- Date of birth: 17 August 1999 (age 27)
- Place of birth: Sèvres, France
- Height: 1.76 m (5 ft 9 in)
- Position: Defender

Team information
- Current team: Dunkerque
- Number: 27

Senior career*
Years	Team	Apps	(Gls)
2018–2022	Valenciennes B	8	(0)
2018–2024	Valenciennes	91	(4)
2025–	Dunkerque	22	(0)
- * Club domestic league appearances and goals as of 11 May 2026

Allan Linguet (born 17 August 1999) is a French professional footballer who plays a defender for Ligue 2 club Dunkerque.

== Career ==
Linguet made his professional debut with Valenciennes in a 2–1 Ligue 2 tie with Chamois Niortais F.C. on 26 April 2019.

On 13 January 2025, Linguet joined Dunkerque on a one-and-a-half-year contract.
