= Jawed Kalai =

French footballer (born 2000)

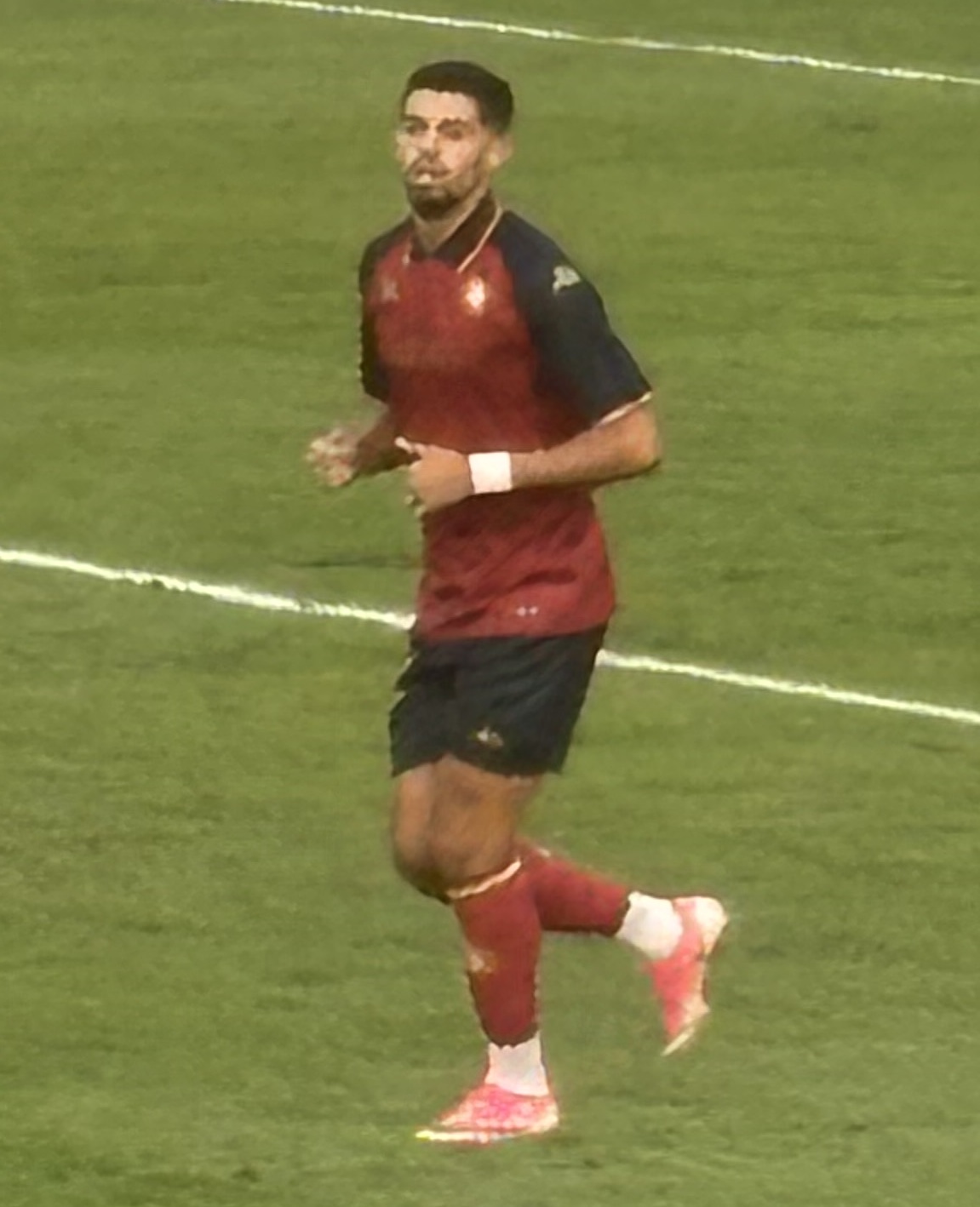
- Kalai with Versailles in 2026

Personal information
- Date of birth: 29 July 2000 (age 26)
- Place of birth: Cambrai, France
- Height: 1.80 m (5 ft 11 in)
- Position: Midfielder

Team information
- Current team: Versailles
- Number: 10

Youth career
- CAS Escaudoeuvres
- –2014: Cambrai
- 2014–2016: Valenciennes
- 2016–2018: Cambrai

Senior career*
Years	Team	Apps	(Gls)
2018–2020	Cambrai		
2020–2021	UR La Louvière		
2021–2024	Valenciennes B	29	(8)
2021–2024	Valenciennes	5	(1)
2022–2023	→ Wasquehal (loan)	20	(1)
2024–2025	SAS Épinal	29	(7)
2025–	Versailles	22	(3)
2025–	Versailles B	2	(0)
- * Club domestic league appearances and goals as of 23 June 2026

Jawad Kalai (born 29 July 2000) is a French professional footballer who plays as a midfielder for Ligue 3 club Versailles.

== Career ==
Kalai started his football career at CAS Escaudoeuvres, before he joined Cambrai at the age of eight. Later, he moved to Valenciennes as an under-14 player. Kalai stayed at Valenciennes for two years, before returning to Cambrai in 2016. In January 2018, Kalai was promoted to Cambrai's first team, playing in the Régional 1.

In July 2020, Kalai joined Belgian club UR La Louvière. From the 2021–22 season, he returned to Valenciennes, where he started on the club's reserve team, playing in the Championnat National 3. However, on 8 January 2022, Kalai got his professional debut for Valenciennes in Ligue 2 in a game against Guingamp, where he came on from the bench for the last minute. On 1 September 2022, Kalai joined Wasquehal on loan until the end of the season.

During the first six months of the 2023-24 season, Kalai made two appearances in Ligue 1 and one in the cup for Valenciennes. In search of more playing time, Kalai returned to his former club, Wasquehal, on a loan deal at the end of January 2024. However, it was revealed the following day that the French Football Federation (FFF) had blocked the transfer for unknown reasons, meaning Kalai had to stay at Valenciennes.

In July 2024, Kalai moved to Championnat National 2 club SAS Épinal.

== Personal life ==
Born in France, Kalai is of Moroccan descent.
