= Julien Masson =

French footballer (born 1998)

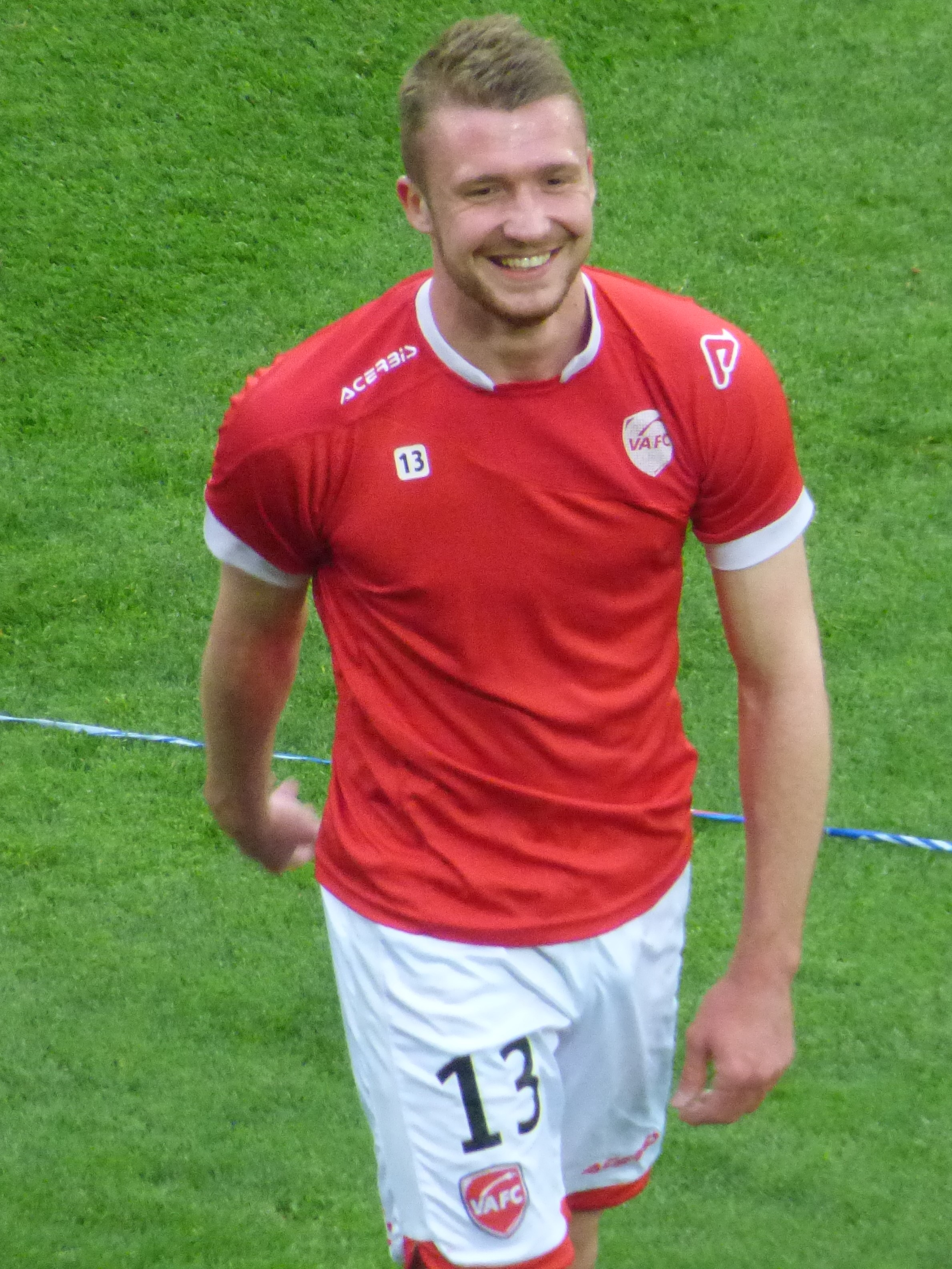

Personal information
- Date of birth: June 18, 1998 (age 28)
- Place of birth: Valenciennes, France
- Position: Midfielder

Team information
- Current team: Sochaux
- Number: 23

Youth career
- Valenciennes

Senior career*
Years	Team	Apps	(Gls)
2016	Valenciennes II	8	(0)
2017–2025	Valenciennes	208	(4)
2025–	Sochaux	31	(1)
- * Club domestic league appearances and goals as of 23 June 2026

Julien Masson (born 18 June 1998) is a French professional footballer who plays as a midfielder for Ligue 2 club Sochaux.

== Professional career ==
Born in Valenciennes, Masson began playing for local side Valenciennes at age 13. Masson made his professional debut for Valenciennes in a Ligue 2 0–0 tie with Red Star on 5 May 2017. On 13 November 2017, Masson signed his first professional contract with Valenciennes, keeping him at the club for 4 years.

Despite an aborted summer transfer to Ligue 1 side Angers, Masson was a mainstay in Valenciennes' squad, making 34 league appearances as he was voted the club's 2019 player of the year by the editorial staff of La Voix du Nord.
