= Stade du Hainaut =

Stadium in Valenciennes, France

Coordinates: 50°20′54.2″N 3°31′53.8″E

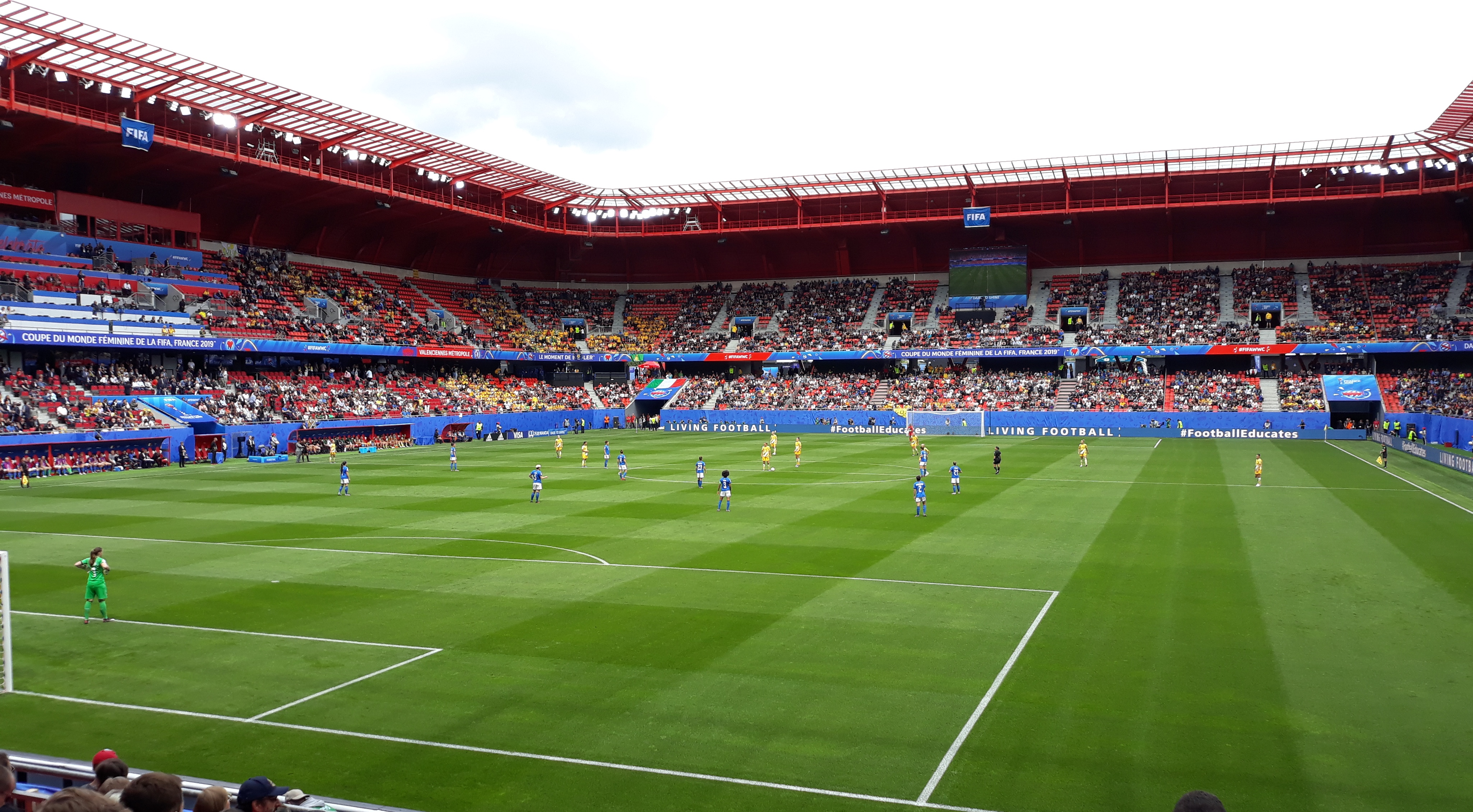
- Interactive map of Stade du Hainaut
- Location: Quartier Nungesser; Valenciennes
- Owner: Valenciennes Métropole
- Operator: Valenciennes Métropole
- Capacity: Football: 25,172; Concerts: 35,000
- Surface: AirFibr (hybrid grass)

Construction
- Built: 6 May 2008
- Opened: 26 July 2011
- Cost: €75 million
- Architects: Michel Macary and Aymeric Zublena

Tenant
- Valenciennes FC (2011–present)

The Stade du Hainaut (French pronunciation: [stad dy ɛno]) is a multi-use stadium in Valenciennes, France. It is used mostly for football matches and hosts the home matches of Valenciennes FC. It has replaced the Stade Nungesser as VAFC's home stadium. The stadium has a capacity of 25,172 spectators for football matches, but its capacity can be extended to 35,000 for concerts. The stadium is one of the venues for the 2019 FIFA Women's World Cup. It hosted 4 group games, a Round of 16 match, and a quarter-final match.

The stadium was constructed at a total cost of 75 million euros. It contains 2,600 club seats and 16 luxury boxes. It has two giant video screens, each 48 square meters in size. Its roof contains 1,800 tons of steel.

== Grand opening ==
The stadium's grand opening occurred on the evening of 26 July 2011, for a friendly football match between Valenciennes FC and Borussia Dortmund. The visitors prevailed 1–0 before a club-record crowd of 22,778.

== Competitions ==
The stadium hosted the 2019 FIFA Women's World Cup.

Date	Time (CEST)	Team #1	Res.	Team #2	Round	Attendance
9 June 2019	13:00	Australia	1–2	Italy	Group C	15,380
12 June 2019	18:00	Germany	1–0	Spain	Group B	20,761
15 June 2019	15:00	Netherlands	3–1	Cameroon	Group E	22,423
18 June 2019	21:00	Italy	0–1	Brazil	Group C	21,669
23 June 2019	17:30	England	3–0	Cameroon	Round of 16	20,148
29 June 2019	15:00	Italy	0–2	Netherlands	Quarter-finals	22,600

== See also ==
- List of football stadiums in France
- Lists of stadiums
