= 2023–24 Paris FC season =

Paris FC
2023–24 season
- Manager: Stéphane Gilli
- Stadium: Stade Sébastien Charléty
- Ligue 2: 5th
- Coupe de France: Round of 32
- Top goalscorer: League: Pierre-Yves Hamel (8); All: Pierre-Yves Hamel (8)
- Average home league attendance: 5,588
Home colours	Away colours	Third colours

The 2023–24 season was Paris FC's 55th season in existence and seventh consecutive in the Ligue 2. They also competed in the Coupe de France.

== Players ==
=== First-team squad ===
As of 3 September 2023.

Note: Flags indicate national team as defined under FIFA eligibility rules; some limited exceptions apply. Players may hold more than one non-FIFA nationality.

No.	Pos.	Nation	Player
5	DF	SEN	Moustapha Mbow
6	MF	FRA	Paul Lasne
7	FW	FRA	Alimami Gory
8	MF	FRA	Yohan Demoncy
9	FW	FRA	Lamine Diaby-Fadiga
10	MF	ALG	Ilan Kebbal
11	FW	FRA	Andy Pembélé
13	DF	CIV	Kouadio-Yves Dabila
14	MF	MTQ	Cyril Mandouki
16	GK	FRA	Obed Nkambadio
17	MF	FRA	Adama Camara
18	MF	FRA	Lohann Doucet (on loan from Nantes)

No.	Pos.	Nation	Player
19	FW	AUS	Mohamed Touré (on loan from Reims)
20	FW	ALG	Julien López
22	DF	MAR	Sofiane Alakouch (on loan from Metz)
23	FW	SUI	Josias Lukembila
25	DF	FRA	Yoan Koré
26	FW	SEN	Lamine Gueye
27	DF	FRA	Jules Gaudin
28	MF	FRA	Gabriel Oualengbe
29	FW	FRA	Pierre-Yves Hamel
30	GK	FRA	Téva Gardies
31	DF	FRA	Samir Chergui
40	GK	CRO	Ivan Filipović

=== Out on loan ===
Note: Flags indicate national team as defined under FIFA eligibility rules; some limited exceptions apply. Players may hold more than one non-FIFA nationality.

No. / Pos. / Nation / Player; — / DF / SEN / Nobel Mendy (on loan to Real Betis)	No. / Pos. / Nation / Player; — / FW / MAD / Warren Caddy (on loan to Annecy)

== Transfers ==
=== In ===
Pos.	Player	Transferred from	Fee	Date	Source
DF	(France) Jules Gaudin	(France) Guingamp	Free	5 July 2023	
MF	(Senegal) Lamine Gueye	(France) Metz		5 July 2023	
MF	(France) Ilan Kebbal	(France) Reims	€2,000,000	10 July 2023	
DF	(Senegal) Moustapha Mbow	(France) Reims	€500,000	20 July 2023	

=== Out ===
Pos.	Player	Transferred to	Fee	Date	Source
DF	(France) Maxime Bernauer	(Croatia) Dinamo Zagreb	€1,200,000	1 July 2023	
MF	(Guinea) Morgan Guilavogui	(France) Lens	€4,000,000	1 July 2023	

== Competitions ==
=== Overall record ===
Competition	First match	Last match	Starting round	Final position	Record							
Competition	First match	Last match	Starting round	Final position	Pld	W	D	L	GF	GA	GD	Win %
Ligue 2	August 2023	17 May 2024	Matchday 1	5th	38	16	11	11	49	42	+7	42.11
Coupe de France	18 November 2023	20 January 2024	Seventh round	Round of 32	4	2	1	1	8	6	+2	50.00
Total					42	18	12	12	57	48	+9	42.86

Source: Soccerway

=== Ligue 2 ===
==== League table ====
Pos	Team	Pld	W	D	L	GF	GA	GD	Pts	Promotion or Relegation
3	Saint-Étienne (O, P)	38	19	8	11	48	31	+17	65	Qualification for promotion play-offs final
4	Rodez	38	16	12	10	62	51	+11	60	Qualification for promotion play-offs semi-final
5	Paris FC	38	16	11	11	49	42	+7	59	Qualification for promotion play-offs semi-final
6	Caen	38	17	7	14	51	45	+6	58	
7	Laval	38	15	10	13	40	45	−5	55	

Updated to match(es) played on 17 May 2024. Source: Ligue 2
Rules for classification: 1) Points; 2) Goal difference; 3) Number of goals scored; 4) Head-to-head goal difference; 5) Fair play points
(O) Play-off winners; (P) Promoted

==== Results summary ====
Overall								Home						Away					
Pld	W	D	L	GF	GA	GD	Pts	W	D	L	GF	GA	GD	W	D	L	GF	GA	GD
38	16	11	11	49	42	+7	59	10	4	5	29	19	+10	6	7	6	20	23	−3

Last updated: 17 May 2024.

==== Results by round ====
Round	1	2	3	4	5	6	7	8	9	10	11	12	13	14	15	16	17	18	19	20	21	22	23	24	25	26	27	28	29	30	31	32	33	34	35	36	37	38
Ground	H	A	A	H	A	H	A	H	A	H	A	H	A	H	H	A	H	A	H	H	A	H	A	H	A	A	H	A	H	A	H	A	H	A	H	A	H	A
Result	L	L	L	W	L	W	L	L	D	L	W	D	W	W	L	W	W	W	D	W	D	L	D	D	D	D	D	W	W	D	W	W	W	L	W	L	W	D
Position	17	19	20	18	18	15	16	17	17	17	16	16	15	12	14	11	10	8	10	8	9	12	10	10	11	12	12	9	7	8	6	5	5	5	5	5	5	5

Updated to match(es) played on 17 May 2024. Source:
A = Away; H = Home; W = Win; D = Draw; L = Loss

==== Matches ====
The league fixtures were unveiled on 29 June 2023.

5 August 2023 1	Paris FC	0–2	Caen	Troyes
19:00 CEST (UTC+2)		Report	Mendy 45+3'; Abdi 62'	Stadium: Stade de l'Aube; Attendance: 1,056; Referee: Nicolas Rainville

12 August 2023 2	Grenoble	2–0	Paris FC	Grenoble
19:00 CEST (UTC+2)	Tourraine (yellow card) 44', (goal) 63'; Sbaï 89'	Report	Doucet (yellow card) 58'; Gory (yellow card) 65'; Mandouki (red card) 70'	Stadium: Stade des Alpes; Attendance: 3,743; Referee: Guillaume Paradis

19 August 2023 3	Pau	2–0	Paris FC	Pau
19:00 CEST (UTC+2)	Beusnard 37'; Boutaïb 62'	Report		Stadium: Nouste Camp; Attendance: 2,846; Referee: Rémi Landry

26 August 2023 4	Paris FC	3–0	Concarneau	Troyes
20:45 CET (UTC+1)	Diaby-Fadiga 42'; Hamel 75', 84'	Report		Stadium: Stade de l'Aube; Attendance: 537; Referee: Olivier Thual

2 September 2023 5	Angers	2–0	Paris FC	Angers
19:00 CEST (UTC+2)	Diony 33'; Bahoya 90+4'	Report		Stadium: Stade Raymond Kopa; Attendance: 5,276; Referee: Faouzi Benchabane

16 September 2023 6	Paris FC	3–0	Amiens	Troyes
19:00 CET (UTC+1)	Josias Lukembila 14'; Toure 43' (pen.); Gory 62'	Report		Stadium: Stade de l'Aube; Attendance: 972; Referee: Ahmed Taleb

23 September 2023 7	Ajaccio	2–1	Paris FC	Ajaccio
19:00 CEST (UTC+2)		Report		Stadium: Stade François Coty; Attendance: 3,774

26 September 2023 8	Paris FC	0–1	Laval	Troyes
20:45 CET (UTC+1)		Report		Stadium: Stade de l'Aube; Attendance: 764

28 October 2023 12	Paris FC	2–2	Troyes	Paris
19:00 CET (UTC+1)				Stadium: Stade Sébastien Charléty

4 November 2023 13	Saint-Étienne	0–1	Paris FC	Guingamp
15:00 CET (UTC+1)		Report	Gory 72'	Stadium: Stade Geoffroy-Guichard; Attendance: 35,563; Referee: Antoine Valnet

11 November 2023 14	Paris FC	1–0	Bastia	Troyes
19:00 CET (UTC+1)	Kebbal 45+3' (pen.)	Report		Stadium: Stade de l'Aube; Attendance: 6,438

25 November 2023 15	Paris FC	1–2	Bordeaux	Paris
19:00 CET (UTC+1)	Kebbal 12' (pen.)	Report	Weissbeck 7'; Barbet 90+3'	Stadium: Stade Sébastien Charléty; Attendance: 13,472; Referee: Abdelatif Kherradji

2 December 2023 16	Guingamp	0–1	Paris FC	Guingamp
19:00 CET (UTC+1)		Report	Kebbal 70' (pen.)	Stadium: Stade de Roudourou; Attendance: 9,173; Referee: Nicolas Rainville

5 December 2023 17	Paris FC	2–0	Rodez	Paris
20:45 CET (UTC+1)	Hamel 1', 23'	Report		Stadium: Stade Sébastien Charléty; Referee: Mickaël Leleu

13 January 2024 20	Paris FC	2–1	Annecy	Paris
19:00 CET (UTC+1)	Gory 51' 76'; Gaudin (yellow card) 64'	Report	Adeline (yellow card) 24'; Junior Diaz (yellow card) 48' (red card) 84'; Hamjatou Soukouna (yellow card) 67'; Ntamack 80'	Stadium: Stade Sébastien Charléty; Attendance: 4,505; Referee: (France) Mathieu Vernice

23 January 2024 21	Laval	1–1	Paris FC	Laval
20:45 CET (UTC+1)	Pagis 6'; Roye (red card) 45+3'; Samassa (yellow card) 73'; Sanna (yellow card) 75'; Adéoti (yellow card) 90'	Report	Lukembila 46'; Camara (yellow card) 47'; Mbow (yellow card) 89'	Stadium: Stade Francis Le Basser; Attendance: 6,260; Referee: (France) Ahmed Taleb

27 January 2024 22	Paris FC	1–2	Dunkerque	Paris
19:00 CET (UTC+1)	Gaudin (yellow card) 37'; Dabila 56'; Diaby-Fadiga (red card) 73'; Camara (yellow card) 89'	Report	Ba (yellow card) 21'; Bardeli 41'; Bah (yellow card) 60'; Courtet 67'	Stadium: Stade Sébastien Charléty; Attendance: 4,278; Referee: (France) Azzedine Souifi

3 February 2024 23	Amiens	1–1	Paris FC	Amiens
19:00 CET (UTC+1)	Assogba (yellow card) 20'; Do Couto (yellow card) 36'; Mafouta 55'	Report	Camara 90+6'	Stadium: Stade de la Licorne; Attendance: 6,639; Referee: (France) Aurélien Petit

10 February 2024 24	Paris FC	1–1	Pau	Paris
19:00 CET (UTC+1)	Camara (yellow card) 65'; Koré (yellow card) 86' (goal) 90+5'	Report	Bassouamina 53'; Beusnard (yellow card) 59'	Stadium: Stade Sébastien Charléty; Attendance: 3,429; Referee: (France) Mikael Lesage

17 February 2024 25	Concarneau	2–2	Paris FC	Caen
19:00 CET (UTC+1)	Ba 24'; Etuin (yellow card) 35' (goal) 59' (pen.); Georgen (yellow card) 65'	Report	López 49'; Mandouki (yellow card) 58'; Gory 80'	Stadium: Stade Michel d'Ornano; Referee: (France) Rémi Landry

24 February 2024 26	Quevilly-Rouen	0–0	Paris FC	Le Petit-Quevilly
19:00 CET (UTC+1)		Report	Gaudin (yellow card) 51'	Stadium: Stade Robert Diochon; Attendance: 3,827; Referee: (France) Mickaël Leleu

2 March 2024 27	Paris FC	0–0	Saint-Étienne	Paris
15:00 CET (UTC+1)	Chergui (yellow card) 45'	Report	Appiah (yellow card) 40'; Maçon (yellow card) 53'	Stadium: Stade Sébastien Charléty; Attendance: 18,000; Referee: (France) Benjamin Lepaysant

9 March 2024 28	Caen	0–1	Paris FC	Caen
19:00 CET (UTC+1)		Report	Hamel (yellow card) 67'; Ollila 85'; Marchetti (yellow card) 89'	Stadium: Stade Michel d'Ornano; Attendance: 17,015; Referee: (France) Pierre Legat

16 March 2024 29	Paris FC	2–0	Ajaccio	Paris
19:00 CET (UTC+1)	Camara (yellow card) 27'; Gory 53'; Dicko 64'; Gaudin (yellow card) 88'	Report	Jacob (yellow card) 57'	Stadium: Stade Sébastien Charléty; Attendance: 405; Referee: (France) Abdelatif Kherradji

30 March 2024 30	Bordeaux	3–3	Paris FC	Bordeaux
19:00 CET (UTC+1)	Biumla (yellow card) 26'; Davitashvili 42'; Barbet 48' (yellow card) 82'; Pedro Díaz 90'; Livolant (yellow card) 90+2'	Report	Dicko 34'; Jabbari (yellow card) 35'; Gaudin 38'; Kebbal 52' (pen.); Chergui (yellow card) 66'; Mbow (yellow card) 90+1'; Mandouki (yellow card) 90+2'	Stadium: Matmut Atlantique; Attendance: 19,256; Referee: (France) Faouzi Benchabane

6 April 2024 31	Paris FC	2–1	Grenoble	Paris
19:00 CEST (UTC+2)	Jabbari 61'; Dabila 76'	Report	Mbemba 25'; Nestor (yellow card) 44'; Paquiez (yellow card) 90+5'	Stadium: Stade Sébastien Charléty; Attendance: 5,235; Referee: (France) Mikael Lesage

13 April 2024 32	Troyes	1–2	Paris FC	Troyes
19:00 CEST (UTC+2)	Tahrat (yellow card) 45+4'; Elisor 64'	Report	Chergui (yellow card) 30'; Camara 45'; Diaby-Fadiga 59'; Mandouki (yellow card) 72'; Dicko (yellow card) 87'	Stadium: Stade de l'Aube; Attendance: 6,157; Referee: (France) Karim Abed

20 April 2024 33	Paris FC	2–1	Valenciennes	Paris
19:00 CEST (UTC+2)	Dicko 20'; Ollila 25'; Camara (yellow card) 46'	Report	Jung 9'; Sanda (yellow card) 86'	Stadium: Stade Sébastien Charléty; Attendance: 5,655; Referee: (France) Mickaël Leleu

23 April 2024 34	Rodez	1–0	Paris FC	Rodez
20:45 CEST (UTC+2)	Kolodziejczak 36' (o.g.); Younoussa (yellow card) 40'	Report		Stadium: Stade Paul-Lignon; Attendance: 3,100; Referee: (France) Thierry Bouille

27 April 2024 35	Paris FC	3–1	Angers	Paris
19:00 CEST (UTC+2)	Jabbari 18' (yellow card) 19'; Kebbal (yellow card) 70' (goal) 83'; Valery 79' (o.g.)	Report	Capelle 41'	Stadium: Stade Sébastien Charléty; Attendance: 10,252; Referee: (France) Ruddy Buquet

4 May 2024 36	Auxerre	2–0	Paris FC	Auxerre
15:00 CEST (UTC+2)	Sinayoko 22'; Onaiwu 57'	Report	Marchetti (yellow card) 22'; Kebbal (yellow card) 44'; Dicko (yellow card) 67'	Stadium: Stade de l'Abbé-Deschamps; Attendance: 16,821; Referee: (France) Aurélien Petit

10 May 2024 37	Paris FC	2–1	Guingamp	Paris
20:45 CEST (UTC+2)	Dicko 27' 78'; Mbow (yellow card) 69'	Report	Merghem (yellow card) 72' (goal) 90+4'	Stadium: Stade Sébastien Charléty; Attendance: 10,009; Referee: (France) Pierre Legat

17 May 2024 38	Bastia	1–1	Paris FC	Furiani
20:45 CEST (UTC+2)	Alfarela 45+2' (pen.) (yellow card) 74'; Santelli (yellow card) 78'	Report	Kolodziejczak (yellow card) 26' (goal) 29'	Stadium: Stade Armand-Cesari; Attendance: 12,600; Referee: (France) Mikael Lesage

=== Coupe de France ===
18 November 2023 Seventh round	US Villejuif	2–2 (4–5 p)	Paris FC	Ivry-sur-Seine
14:00 CET (UTC+1)	Arby 50', 56'	Report	Diaby-Fadiga 10'; Mbow 83'	Stadium: Stade de Clerville; Referee: Brendan Roffet

9 December 2023 Eighth round	Paris FC	3–1	Saint-Denis FC	Paris
17:00 CET (UTC+1)	Mandouki (yellow card) 64'; Koré 68'; Diaby-Fadiga 88' 90+5'	Report	Toiyardine Issoufi (yellow card) 61'; Toufeily Bacary 72'	Stadium: Stade Sébastien Charléty; Attendance: 2,081; Referee: (France) Karim Abed

6 January 2024 Round of 64	Olympique Alès	1–2	Paris FC	Alès
15:30 CET (UTC+1)	Abdoulaye Diaby (yellow card) 51'; Dabo (yellow card) 54'; Cros (yellow card) 55'; Mahamat 90+6' (pen.)	Report	Jabbari 2'; Kebbal 77'	Stadium: Stade Pierre Pibarot; Attendance: 2,820; Referee: (France) Hakim Ben El Hadj

20 January 2024 Round of 32	Valenciennes	2–1	Paris FC	Valenciennes
17:30 CET (UTC+1)	Foe-Ondoa 15' (yellow card) 58'; Masson 48'; Oyewusi (yellow card) 62'	Report	Kebbal 10'; Lukembila (yellow card) 73'	Stadium: Stade du Hainaut; Attendance: 3,131; Referee: (France) Benoît Bastien
