= List of French football transfers winter 2024–25 =

This is a list of French football transfers for the 2024–25 winter transfer window. Only transfers featuring Ligue 1 and Ligue 2 are listed.

== Ligue 1 ==
Note: Flags indicate national team as has been defined under FIFA eligibility rules. Players may hold more than one non-FIFA nationality.

=== Paris Saint-Germain ===
In:

No.	Pos.	Nation	Player
7	FW	GEO	Khvicha Kvaratskhelia (from (Italy) Napoli)

Out:

No.	Pos.	Nation	Player
11	FW	ESP	Marco Asensio (on loan to (England) Aston Villa)
23	FW	FRA	Randal Kolo Muani (on loan to (Italy) Juventus)
37	DF	SVK	Milan Škriniar (on loan to (Turkey) Fenerbahçe)
—	DF	ESP	Juan Bernat (to (Spain) Villarreal, previously on loan)
—	MF	NED	Xavi Simons (to (Germany) RB Leipzig, previously on loan)
—	MF	ITA	Cher Ndour (to (Italy) Fiorentina, previously on loan at (Turkey) Beşiktaş)

=== Monaco ===
In:

No.	Pos.	Nation	Player
8	MF	LBY	Al-Musrati (on loan from (Turkey) Beşiktaş)
14	FW	DEN	Mika Biereth (from (Austria) Sturm Graz)

Out:

No.	Pos.	Nation	Player
8	MF	BEL	Eliot Matazo (to (England) Hull City)

=== Brest ===
In:

No.	Pos.	Nation	Player
18	DF	FRA	Justin Bourgault (from Concarneau)
33	MF	MLI	Hamidou Makalou (from (Mali) Guidars)

Out:

No.	Pos.	Nation	Player
11	FW	FRA	Axel Camblan (on loan to Valenciennes)
—	DF	FRA	Lilian Brassier (on loan to Rennes, previously on loan at Marseille)

=== Lille ===
In:

No.	Pos.	Nation	Player
24	FW	ENG	Chuba Akpom (on loan from (Netherlands) Ajax)

Out:

No.	Pos.	Nation	Player
13	DF	ALG	Akim Zedadka (to (Poland) Piast Gliwice)
27	FW	GUI	Mohamed Bayo (on loan to (Belgium) Antwerp)
28	DF	POR	Rafael Fernandes (on loan to (Scotland) Rangers)
36	DF	FRA	Ousmane Touré (on loan to Valenciennes)

=== Nice ===
In:

No.	Pos.	Nation	Player
28	MF	FRA	Baptiste Santamaria (on loan from Rennes)

Out:

No.	Pos.	Nation	Player
18	MF	ROU	Rareș Ilie (on loan to (Italy) Catanzaro)
36	MF	GUI	Issiaga Camara (on loan to Dijon)
—	FW	GUI	Aliou Baldé (on loan to (Switzerland) Lausanne, previously on loan at (Germany) VfL Bochum)

=== Lyon ===
In:

No.	Pos.	Nation	Player
23	MF	ARG	Thiago Almada (on loan from (Brazil) Botafogo)

Out:

No.	Pos.	Nation	Player
1	GK	POR	Anthony Lopes (to Nantes)
6	MF	FRA	Maxence Caqueret (to (Italy) Como)
9	FW	NGA	Gift Orban (to (Germany) TSG Hoffenheim)
12	FW	CIV	Wilfried Zaha (loan return to (Turkey) Galatasaray)
17	FW	ALG	Saïd Benrahma (on loan to (Saudi Arabia) Neom)
28	MF	FRA	Florent Sanchez (to Orléans)
30	GK	FRA	Justin Bengui (on loan to (Serbia) Jedinstvo Ub)
34	MF	FRA	Mahamadou Diawara (on loan to Le Havre)
—	DF	BRA	Adryelson (on loan to (Belgium) Anderlecht, previously on loan at (Brazil) Botafogo)
—	FW	BRA	Jeffinho (to (Brazil) Botafogo, previously on loan)

=== Lens ===
In:

No.	Pos.	Nation	Player
4	DF	BIH	Nidal Čelik (from (Bosnia and Herzegovina) Sarajevo)
19	FW	CTA	Goduine Koyalipou (from (Bulgaria) CSKA Sofia)
25	FW	SWE	Jeremy Agbonifo (on loan from (Sweden) Häcken)
27	DF	SLE	Juma Bah (on loan from (England) Manchester City)
30	GK	AUS	Mathew Ryan (from (Italy) Roma)
—	MF	MNE	Andrija Bulatović (from (Montenegro) Budućnost Podgorica)

Out:

No.	Pos.	Nation	Player
4	DF	AUT	Kevin Danso (on loan to (England) Tottenham Hotspur)
10	MF	POR	David Da Costa (to (United States) Portland Timbers)
19	MF	FRA	Jimmy Cabot (retired)
25	DF	UZB	Abdukodir Khusanov (to (England) Manchester City)
27	DF	SEN	Sidi Bane (on loan to Annecy)
29	MF	POL	Przemysław Frankowski (on loan to (Turkey) Galatasaray)
30	GK	FRA	Brice Samba (to Rennes)
37	DF	FRA	Ismaëlo Ganiou (on loan to Annecy)
—	MF	MNE	Andrija Bulatović (on loan to (Montenegro) Budućnost Podgorica)

=== Marseille ===
In:

No.	Pos.	Nation	Player
4	DF	BRA	Luiz Felipe (from (Saudi Arabia) Al-Ittihad)
9	FW	ALG	Amine Gouiri (from Rennes)
22	MF	ALG	Ismaël Bennacer (on loan from (Italy) Milan)
77	DF	BIH	Amar Dedić (from (Austria) Red Bull Salzburg)

Out:

No.	Pos.	Nation	Player
7	MF	ARG	Valentín Carboni (loan return to (Italy) Inter Milan)
9	FW	FRA	Elye Wahi (to (Germany) Eintracht Frankfurt)
18	DF	CIV	Bamo Meïté (on loan to Montpellier)
20	DF	FRA	Lilian Brassier (loan return to Brest)
22	FW	FRA	Enzo Sternal (to (Belgium) RSCA Futures)
24	MF	CMR	François Mughe (on loan to (Greece) Athens Kallithea)
37	MF	ENG	Emran Soglo (to (Austria) Sturm Graz)
51	MF	CAN	Ismaël Koné (on loan to Rennes)
—	GK	ESP	Pau López (on loan to (Mexico) Toluca, previously on loan at (Spain) Girona)

=== Reims ===
In:

No.	Pos.	Nation	Player
3	DF	JPN	Hiroki Sekine (from (Japan) Kashiwa Reysol)
12	FW	USA	Jordan Pefok (from (Germany) Union Berlin)
24	MF	CIV	Mory Gbane (from (Portugal) Gil Vicente)
30	MF	IRL	John Patrick (from (Spain) Getafe B)
31	DF	SWE	Malcolm Jeng (from (Sweden) Sirius)

Out:

No.	Pos.	Nation	Player
4	DF	BEL	Maxime Busi (on loan to (Netherlands) NAC Breda)
5	DF	CIV	Emmanuel Agbadou (to (England) Wolverhampton Wanderers)
11	FW	FRA	Amine Salama (on loan to (Italy) Torino)
15	MF	ZIM	Marshall Munetsi (to (England) Wolverhampton Wanderers)
25	DF	BEL	Thibault De Smet (to Paris FC)

=== Rennes ===
In:

No.	Pos.	Nation	Player
1	GK	FRA	Brice Samba (from Lens)
5	DF	FRA	Lilian Brassier (on loan from Brest, previously on loan at Marseille)
7	FW	JPN	Kyōgo Furuhashi (from (Scotland) Celtic)
8	MF	CIV	Seko Fofana (from (Saudi Arabia) Al Nassr, previously on loan at (Saudi Arabia) Al-Ettifaq)
11	FW	JOR	Musa Al-Taamari (from Montpellier)
19	FW	BEL	Kazeem Olaigbe (from (Belgium) Cercle Brugge)
24	DF	FRA	Anthony Rouault (from (Germany) VfB Stuttgart)
28	MF	BEL	Ayanda Sishuba (from (Italy) Hellas Verona)
90	MF	CAN	Ismaël Koné (on loan from Marseille)

Out:

No.	Pos.	Nation	Player
7	MF	DEN	Albert Grønbæk (on loan to (England) Southampton)
8	MF	FRA	Baptiste Santamaria (on loan to Nice)
10	FW	ALG	Amine Gouiri (to Marseille)
19	FW	DEN	Henrik Meister (on loan to (Italy) Pisa)
27	FW	POR	Jota (to (Scotland) Celtic)
28	MF	FIN	Glen Kamara (on loan to (Saudi Arabia) Al-Shabab)
48	DF	MAR	Abdelhamid Aït Boudlal (on loan to Amiens)
55	DF	NOR	Leo Østigård (on loan to (Germany) TSG Hoffenheim)
—	DF	BEL	Arthur Theate (to (Germany) Eintracht Frankfurt, previously on loan)

=== Toulouse ===
In:

No.	Pos.	Nation	Player

Out:

No.	Pos.	Nation	Player
5	MF	AUS	Denis Genreau (to (Spain) Deportivo La Coruña)
30	GK	ESP	Álex Domínguez (on loan to (Spain) Eibar)
—	FW	NED	Ibrahim Cissoko (on loan to (England) Sheffield Wednesday, previously on loan at (England) Plymouth Argyle)
—	DF	SWE	Oliver Zandén (to (Sweden) Brommapojkarna, previously on loan at (Denmark) Randers)

=== Montpellier ===
In:

No.	Pos.	Nation	Player
2	DF	CIV	Bamo Meïté (on loan from Marseille)
7	FW	ALG	Andy Delort (on loan from (Algeria) MC Alger)
18	MF	FRA	Nicolas Pays (from Le Puy)
52	DF	SRB	Nikola Maksimović (free agent)

Out:

No.	Pos.	Nation	Player
7	FW	FRA	Arnaud Nordin (to (Germany) Mainz 05)
8	FW	NGA	Akor Adams (to (Spain) Sevilla)
9	FW	JOR	Musa Al-Taamari (to Rennes)
15	MF	SUI	Gabriel Barès (to (Spain) Burgos)
20	MF	MLI	Birama Touré (on loan to (Turkey) Manisa)

=== Strasbourg ===
In:

No.	Pos.	Nation	Player
2	DF	IRL	Andrew Omobamidele (on loan from (England) Nottingham Forest)
27	FW	ENG	Sam Amo-Ameyaw (on loan from (England) Southampton)
32	DF	ARG	Valentín Barco (on loan from (England) Brighton & Hove Albion, previously on loan at (Spain) Sevilla)

Out:

No.	Pos.	Nation	Player
4	DF	GUI	Saïdou Sow (on loan to Nantes)
9	FW	SRB	Miloš Luković (on loan to (Netherlands) Heerenveen)
12	DF	USA	Caleb Wiley (loan return to (England) Chelsea)
16	GK	FRA	Robin Risser (on loan to Red Star)
18	MF	FRA	Junior Mwanga (on loan to Le Havre)
28	DF	FRA	Marvin Senaya (on loan to (Switzerland) Lausanne)
40	FW	MTQ	Jérémy Sebas (on loan to Bastia)
—	FW	FRA	Aboubacar Ali Abdallah (on loan to (Portugal) Torreense, previously on loan at Nîmes)
—	FW	CIV	Patrick Ouotro (on loan to (Belgium) Seraing, previously on loan at Martigues)
—	FW	HAI	Dany Jean (to (Portugal) Torreense, previously on loan at Rodez)

=== Nantes ===
In:

No.	Pos.	Nation	Player
13	MF	FRA	Francis Coquelin (free agent)
16	GK	POR	Anthony Lopes (from Lyon)
17	FW	COD	Meschak Elia (on loan from (Switzerland) Young Boys)
24	DF	GUI	Saïdou Sow (on loan from Strasbourg)

Out:

No.	Pos.	Nation	Player
2	DF	HAI	Jean-Kévin Duverne (on loan to (Belgium) Kortrijk)
7	FW	CMR	Ignatius Ganago (on loan to (United States) New England Revolution)
17	MF	CIV	Jean-Philippe Gbamin (to (Switzerland) Zürich)

=== Le Havre ===
In:

No.	Pos.	Nation	Player
23	MF	FRA	Junior Mwanga (on loan from Strasbourg)
34	MF	FRA	Mahamadou Diawara (on loan from Lyon)
97	DF	SEN	Fodé Ballo-Touré (from (Italy) Milan Futuro)
99	FW	EGY	Ahmed Hassan (from (Portugal) Rio Ave)

Out:

No.	Pos.	Nation	Player
5	MF	MAR	Oussama Targhalline (to (Netherlands) Feyenoord)
11	FW	USA	Emmanuel Sabbi (to (Canada) Vancouver Whitecaps)
22	DF	GUF	Yoann Salmier (to Clermont)
27	DF	CIV	Christopher Opéri (to (Turkey) İstanbul Başakşehir)
29	FW	FRA	Samuel Grandsir (to Caen)
77	FW	FRA	Steve Ngoura (to (Belgium) Cercle Brugge)
—	GK	FRA	Paul Argney (on loan to (Belgium) Francs Borains)

=== Auxerre ===
In:

No.	Pos.	Nation	Player
12	DF	NOR	Fredrik Oppegård (from (Netherlands) PSV)
80	MF	FRA	Han-Noah Massengo (on loan from (England) Burnley)

Out:

No.	Pos.	Nation	Player
5	DF	FRA	Théo Pellenard (to Laval)
6	DF	MAR	Saad Agouzoul (on loan to (Poland) Radomiak Radom)
97	MF	MAD	Rayan Raveloson (to (Switzerland) Young Boys)

=== Angers ===
In:

No.	Pos.	Nation	Player

Out:

No.	Pos.	Nation	Player
8	MF	SEN	Joseph Lopy (to Pau)
9	FW	FRA	Loïs Diony (on loan to (Turkey) Bandırmaspor)

=== Saint-Étienne ===
In:

No.	Pos.	Nation	Player
7	FW	FRA	Irvin Cardona (on loan from (Germany) FC Augsburg, previously on loan at (Spain) Espanyol)
13	DF	FRA	Maxime Bernauer (on loan from (Croatia) Dinamo Zagreb)

Out:

No.	Pos.	Nation	Player
7	MF	FRA	Thomas Monconduit (to Amiens)
18	MF	FRA	Mathieu Cafaro (to Paris FC)
37	MF	FRA	Mathis Amougou (to (England) Chelsea)
39	FW	FRA	Ayman Aiki (on loan to Bastia)

== Ligue 2 ==
Note: Flags indicate national team as has been defined under FIFA eligibility rules. Players may hold more than one non-FIFA nationality.

=== Metz ===
In:

No.	Pos.	Nation	Player
4	DF	GAB	Urie-Michel Mboula (on loan from (Turkey) Şanlıurfaspor)
18	FW	SEN	Idrissa Gueye (from (Senegal) Génération Foot)
29	GK	BEL	Arnaud Bodart (from (Belgium) Standard Liège)

Out:

No.	Pos.	Nation	Player
5	DF	GNB	Fali Candé (on loan to (Italy) Venezia)
26	FW	SEN	Malick Mbaye (on loan to Amiens)
31	FW	FRA	Simon Elisor (to (Portugal) Famalicão)

=== Lorient ===
In:

No.	Pos.	Nation	Player
22	FW	FRA	Eli Junior Kroupi (on loan from (England) Bournemouth)

Out:

No.	Pos.	Nation	Player
5	DF	FRA	Benjamin Mendy (to (Switzerland) Zürich)
11	MF	FRA	Théo Le Bris (on loan to Guingamp)
22	FW	FRA	Eli Junior Kroupi (to (England) Bournemouth)

=== Clermont ===
In:

No.	Pos.	Nation	Player
21	DF	GUF	Yoann Salmier (from Le Havre)
23	DF	FRA	Yoan Koré (on loan from Paris FC)
32	FW	FRA	Kader Bamba (free agent)

Out:

No.	Pos.	Nation	Player
40	GK	GNB	Ouparine Djoco (on loan to Bergerac)
49	FW	AUS	Musa Toure (to (Denmark) Randers)
70	FW	GUI	Yadaly Diaby (to Grenoble)
92	MF	MAR	Aïman Maurer (to (Belgium) RWD Molenbeek)
97	DF	FRA	Jérémy Jacquet (loan return to Rennes)
99	GK	SEN	Mory Diaw (on loan to Rodez)
—	DF	FRA	Andy Pelmard (on loan to (Spain) Las Palmas, previously on loan at (Italy) Lecce)
—	DF	BEL	Maximiliano Caufriez (on loan to (Austria) Red Bull Salzburg, previously on loan at (Spain) Valencia)

=== Rodez ===
In:

No.	Pos.	Nation	Player
15	DF	FRA	Till Cissokho (on loan from (Portugal) Estrela da Amadora)
27	MF	FRA	Alexis Trouillet (from (Greece) Panathinaikos)
99	GK	SEN	Mory Diaw (on loan from Clermont)

Out:

No.	Pos.	Nation	Player
20	FW	HAI	Dany Jean (loan return to Strasbourg)
29	DF	FRA	Grégory Coelho (on loan to Balagne)

=== Paris FC ===
In:

No.	Pos.	Nation	Player
13	MF	FRA	Mathieu Cafaro (from Saint-Étienne)
28	DF	BEL	Thibault De Smet (from Reims)

Out:

No.	Pos.	Nation	Player
6	DF	FRA	Aboubaka Soumahoro (to (Germany) Hamburger SV)
25	DF	FRA	Yoan Koré (on loan to Clermont)
27	DF	FRA	Jules Gaudin (on loan to Caen)
28	MF	CTA	Gabriel Oualengbe (on loan to Toulon)

=== Caen ===
In:

No.	Pos.	Nation	Player
5	DF	GAB	Alex Moucketou-Moussounda (on loan from (Cyprus) Aris Limassol)
15	DF	FRA	Jules Gaudin (on loan from Paris FC)
21	FW	FRA	Samuel Grandsir (from Le Havre)
24	MF	MAR	Yassine Benrahou (on loan from (Croatia) Hajduk Split)
88	MF	CIV	Adriel Ba Loua (from (Poland) Lech Poznań)

Out:

No.	Pos.	Nation	Player
7	FW	FRA	Tidiam Gomis (to (Germany) RB Leipzig)
27	DF	FRA	Daylam Meddah (on loan to Pau)

=== Laval ===
In:

No.	Pos.	Nation	Player
2	DF	FRA	Théo Pellenard (from Auxerre)

Out:

No.	Pos.	Nation	Player

=== Amiens ===
In:

No.	Pos.	Nation	Player
6	DF	MAR	Abdelhamid Aït Boudlal (on loan from Rennes)
8	MF	FRA	Victor Lobry (free agent)
11	FW	SEN	Malick Mbaye (on loan from Metz)
37	MF	FRA	Thomas Monconduit (from Saint-Étienne)
78	FW	FRA	Joan Tincres (on loan from Monaco U19)

Out:

No.	Pos.	Nation	Player
2	DF	MLI	Mamadou Fofana (to (United States) New England Revolution)
5	DF	ENG	Osaze Urhoghide (to (United States) Dallas)
22	FW	MAR	Elyess Dao (to (Belgium) Anderlecht)
25	MF	FRA	Owen Gene (to (United States) Minnesota United)
26	FW	FRA	Yvan Ikia Dimi (on loan to Bordeaux)
29	MF	CMR	Frank Boya (to (Mexico) Tijuana)
94	FW	FRA	Mathis Touho (on loan to (Italy) Foggia)

=== Guingamp ===
In:

No.	Pos.	Nation	Player
28	MF	FRA	Théo Le Bris (on loan from Lorient)

Out:

No.	Pos.	Nation	Player
24	DF	FRA	Pierre Lemonnier (to Red Star)

=== Pau ===
In:

No.	Pos.	Nation	Player
8	MF	SEN	Joseph Lopy (from Angers)
27	FW	BFA	Mamady Bangré (on loan from Grenoble)
97	DF	FRA	Daylam Meddah (on loan from Caen)

Out:

No.	Pos.	Nation	Player
8	MF	COM	Iyad Mohamed (to (Portugal) Casa Pia)
20	FW	FRA	Loïck Lespinasse (free agent)
22	DF	CIV	Ange Ahoussou (to (Austria) Rapid Wien)
27	MF	FRA	Kylian Gasnier (on loan to Valenciennes)
30	FW	FRA	Yonis Njoh (on loan to (Denmark) Viborg)

=== Grenoble ===
In:

No.	Pos.	Nation	Player
7	FW	GUI	Yadaly Diaby (from Clermont)
30	MF	SEN	Samba Lélé Diba (from (Greece) Athens Kallithea)

Out:

No.	Pos.	Nation	Player
7	FW	SEN	Pape Meïssa Ba (to (Germany) Schalke 04)
11	FW	BFA	Mamady Bangré (on loan to Pau)
19	FW	FRA	Lenny Joseph (to (Hungary) Ferencváros)
20	MF	FRA	Baptiste Isola (on loan to Vendée Poiré-sur-Vie)

=== Bastia ===
In:

No.	Pos.	Nation	Player
19	FW	FRA	Ayman Aiki (on loan from Saint-Étienne)
22	FW	MTQ	Jérémy Sebas (on loan from Strasbourg)

Out:

No.	Pos.	Nation	Player
19	MF	FRA	Matéo Loubatières (on loan to Istres)
22	DF	MLI	Charles Traoré (free agent)
25	FW	FRA	Clément Rodrigues (on loan to (England) Barnsley)

=== Annecy ===
In:

No.	Pos.	Nation	Player
4	DF	FRA	Ismaëlo Ganiou (on loan from Lens)
15	DF	SEN	Sidi Bane (on loan from Lens)
19	FW	SUI	Ranjan Neelakandan (from (Switzerland) Bellinzona)
33	FW	FRA	Kilyan Veniere (from Andrézieux)

Out:

No.	Pos.	Nation	Player
3	DF	CMR	Moïse Mahop (to Versailles)
4	DF	FRA	Ritchy Valme (loan return to Monaco U21)

=== Ajaccio ===
In:

No.	Pos.	Nation	Player

Out:

No.	Pos.	Nation	Player
1	GK	FRA	Mathieu Michel (on loan to Valenciennes)
9	FW	CGO	Christopher Ibayi (to (Switzerland) Thun)
26	MF	FRA	Tim Jabol-Folcarelli (to (Turkey) Trabzonspor)

=== Dunkerque ===
In:

No.	Pos.	Nation	Player
11	MF	ROU	Alexi Pitu (free agent)
25	DF	ANG	Núrio Fortuna (on loan from (Belgium) Gent)
27	DF	FRA	Allan Linguet (free agent)
31	MF	FRA	Abdoullah Ba (on loan from (England) Sunderland)
77	FW	KSA	Muhannad Al-Saad (on loan from (Saudi Arabia) Neom)

Out:

No.	Pos.	Nation	Player
3	DF	TOG	Loïc Bessilé (to (Slovakia) Trenčín)
29	FW	BEL	Nachon Nsingi (loan return to (Belgium) OH Leuven)

=== Troyes ===
In:

No.	Pos.	Nation	Player
9	FW	FRA	Mounaïm El Idrissy (from (Belgium) Kortrijk)
26	MF	FRA	Alexandre Phliponeau (free agent)

Out:

No.	Pos.	Nation	Player
19	MF	BEL	Joseph Nonge (loan return to (Italy) Juventus)
—	DF	ECU	Jackson Porozo (on loan to (Mexico) Tijuana, previously on loan at (Spain) Leganés)
—	MF	BRA	Metinho (on loan to (Switzerland) Basel, previously on loan at (Netherlands) Sparta Rotterdam)
—	FW	ALG	Noa Cervantes (on loan to Paris 13 Atletico, previously on loan at Châteauroux)

=== Red Star ===
In:

No.	Pos.	Nation	Player
24	DF	FRA	Pierre Lemonnier (from Guingamp)
40	GK	FRA	Robin Risser (on loan from Strasbourg)
50	GK	FRA	Valentin Rabouille (free agent)

Out:

No.	Pos.	Nation	Player
17	FW	FRA	Ivann Botella (on loan to (Belgium) La Louvière)
77	FW	CIV	Achille Anani (on loan to Villefranche)
93	DF	FRA	Aniss El Hriti (to Versailles)

=== Martigues ===
In:

No.	Pos.	Nation	Player

Out:

No.	Pos.	Nation	Player
19	FW	CIV	Patrick Ouotro (loan return to Strasbourg)
30	GK	FRA	Jérémy Aymes (to Cannes)

== See also ==
- 2024–25 Ligue 1
- 2024–25 Ligue 2
