= 2022–23 Paris FC season =

Paris FC
2022–23 season
- President: Pierre Ferracci
- Head coach: Thierry Laurey
- Stadium: Stade Charléty
- Ligue 2: 7th
- Coupe de France: Round of 16
- Top goalscorer: League: Morgan Guilavogui (15); All: Morgan Guilavogui (18)
Home colours	Away colours

The 2022–23 season was the 54th in the history of Paris FC and their sixth consecutive season in the second division. The club participated in Ligue 2 and the Coupe de France.

== Players ==
As of 31 January 2023.

Note: Flags indicate national team as defined under FIFA eligibility rules; some limited exceptions apply. Players may hold more than one non-FIFA nationality.

No.	Pos.	Nation	Player
1	GK	FRA	Vincent Demarconnay (captain)
2	DF	FRA	Setigui Karamoko
6	MF	FRA	Paul Lasne
7	MF	FRA	Mehdi Chahiri (on loan from Strasbourg)
8	DF	FRA	Yvann Maçon (on loan from Saint-Étienne)
9	FW	MAR	Khalid Boutaïb
10	MF	URU	Jonathan Iglesias
11	MF	FRA	Ilan Kebbal (on loan from Reims)
12	MF	RSA	Lebogang Phiri (on loan from Çaykur Rizespor)
13	DF	CIV	Kouadio-Yves Dabila
14	MF	MTQ	Cyril Mandouki
15	DF	FRA	Jordan Lefort
16	GK	FRA	Obed Nkambadio

No.	Pos.	Nation	Player
17	FW	FRA	Pierre-Yves Hamel
19	DF	GUI	Ousmane Kanté
20	FW	ALG	Julien López
21	FW	GUI	Morgan Guilavogui
22	FW	FRA	Warren Caddy
24	DF	FRA	Maxime Bernauer
25	DF	FRA	Yoan Koré
27	FW	FRA	Alimami Gory
29	DF	FRA	Florent Hanin
30	GK	FRA	Téva Gardies
31	DF	FRA	Samir Chergui
35	MF	CIV	Sékou Sanogo (on loan from Red Star Belgrade)
40	GK	CRO	Ivan Filipović

=== Out on loan ===
Note: Flags indicate national team as defined under FIFA eligibility rules; some limited exceptions apply. Players may hold more than one non-FIFA nationality.

No.	Pos.	Nation	Player
—	DF	SEN	Youssoupha N'Diaye (on loan to Stade Briochin)
—	MF	FRA	Yohan Demoncy (on loan to Annecy)
—	MF	FRA	Check Oumar Diakité (on loan to Le Havre)

No.	Pos.	Nation	Player
—	FW	FRA	Lamine Diaby-Fadiga (on loan to FC Eindhoven)
—	FW	USA	Patrick Koffi (on loan to US Lusitanos)
—	FW	FRA	Andy Pembélé (on loan to Rodez)

== Transfers ==
=== In ===
No.	Pos.	Player	Transferred from	Fee	Date	Source
	FW	(France) Pierre-Yves Hamel	(France) Lorient		1 July 2022	
11	FW	(France) Alimami Gory	(Belgium) Cercle Brugge		9 July 2022	
13	DF	(Ivory Coast) Kouadio-Yves Dabila	(France) Lille		8 August 2022	
	DF	(France) Jordan Lefort	(Switzerland) Young Boys		30 August 2022	
	MF	(France) Ilan Kebbal	(France) Reims	Loan	1 September 2022	

== Pre-season and friendlies ==
Win Draw Loss

2 July 2022 Friendly	Lens	0–0	Paris FC	Calais
15:00 CEST (UTC+2)				Stadium: Stade de l'Epopée

12 July 2022 Friendly	Paris FC	3–1	Versailles	Orly
18:00 CEST (UTC+2)	Bernauer 53'; Owono 80'; Caddy 82'		Michel 85'	Stadium: Centre d’entrainement Paris FC

16 July 2022 Friendly	Paris FC	1–2	UNFP	Orly
18:00 CEST (UTC+2)	Mandouki 34' (pen.)		Jobello 67'; Rajsel 79'	Stadium: Centre d’entrainement Paris FC

23 July 2022 Friendly	Paris FC	1–0	Ajaccio	Orly
18:00 CEST (UTC+2)	López 47'			Stadium: Centre d’entrainement Paris FC

23 July 2022 Friendly	Paris FC	2–0	Créteil-Lusitanos	Orly
20:00 CEST (UTC+2)	Bamba 37'; Caddy 80' (pen.)			Stadium: Centre d’entrainement Paris FC

16 December 2022 Friendly	Paris Saint-Germain	2–1	Paris FC	Saint-Germain-en-Laye
10:00 CET (UTC+1)	Mukiele 16'; Gharbi 52'		El Hannach 61' (o.g.)	Stadium: Centre d'entraînement Ooredoo; Referee: Marc Bollengier

21 December 2022 Friendly	Paris FC	1–0	Troyes	Orly
15:00 CET (UTC+1)				Stadium: Centre d’entrainement Paris FC

== Competitions ==
=== Overall record ===
Competition	First match	Last match	Starting round	Final position	Record							
Competition	First match	Last match	Starting round	Final position	Pld	W	D	L	GF	GA	GD	Win %
Ligue 2	1 August 2022	2 June 2023	Matchday 1	7th	38	15	10	13	45	43	+2	39.47
Coupe de France	30 October 2022	8 February 2023	Seventh round	Round of 16	5	4	1	0	13	3	+10	80.00
Total					43	19	11	13	58	46	+12	44.19

Source: Soccerway

=== Ligue 2 ===
==== League table ====
Pos	Team	Pld	W	D	L	GF	GA	GD	Pts	Promotion or Relegation
5	Caen	38	16	11	11	52	43	+9	59	
6	Guingamp	38	15	10	13	51	46	+5	55	
7	Paris FC	38	15	10	13	45	43	+2	55	
8	Saint-Étienne	38	15	11	12	63	57	+6	53 (Note: Saint-Étienne were deducted three points for a pitch invasion during their relegation play-off the previous season.)	
9	Sochaux (D, R)	38	15	7	16	54	41	+13	52	Relegation to Championnat National

Source: Ligue 2
Rules for classification: 1) Points; 2) Goal difference; 3) Number of goals scored; 4) Head-to-head goal difference; 5) Fair play points
(D) Disqualified; (R) Relegated

==== Results summary ====
Overall								Home						Away					
Pld	W	D	L	GF	GA	GD	Pts	W	D	L	GF	GA	GD	W	D	L	GF	GA	GD
38	15	10	13	45	43	+2	55	8	3	8	24	22	+2	7	7	5	21	21	0

Source: Ligue 2

==== Results by round ====
Round	1	2	3	4	5	6	7
Ground	A	H	A	A	H	A	H
Result	D	W	D	L	D	D	L
Position	14	5	9	11	13	11	

Source: Ligue 2
A = Away; H = Home; W = Win; D = Draw; L = Loss

==== Matches ====
The league fixtures were announced on 17 June 2022.

1 August 2022 1	Sochaux	0–0	Paris FC	Montbéliard
20:45 CEST (UTC+2)		Report		Stadium: Stade Auguste Bonal; Attendance: 12,647; Referee: Aurélien Petit

6 August 2022 2	Paris FC	2–1	Quevilly-Rouen	Paris
19:00 CEST (UTC+2)	Bernauer 6'; Chahiri 33'	Report	Pierret 79'	Stadium: Stade Sébastien Charléty; Attendance: 2,752; Referee: Nicolas Rainville

13 August 2022 3	Guingamp	0–0	Paris FC	Guingamp
15:00 CEST (UTC+2)		Report		Stadium: Stade de Roudourou; Attendance: 10,114; Referee: Guillaume Paradis

20 August 2022 4	Niort	2–1	Paris FC	Niort
19:00 CEST (UTC+2)	Boutobba 56'; Zemzemi 61'	Report	Caddy 73'	Stadium: Stade René Gaillard; Attendance: 2,000; Referee: Rémi Landry

27 August 2022 5	Paris FC	1–1	Caen	Paris
19:00 CEST (UTC+2)	Karamoko (yellow card) 43'; Chergui (yellow card) 75'; López 87'; Name (yellow card) 90+3'	Report	Thomas 44'; Teikeu (yellow card) 53'; Mohamed (yellow card) 86'	Stadium: Stade Sébastien Charléty; Attendance: 4,179; Referee: Alexandre Perreau Niel

30 August 2022 6	Amiens	1–1	Paris FC	Amiens
20:45 CEST (UTC+2)	Arokodare 59'	Report	Iglesias 65'	Stadium: Stade de la Licorne; Attendance: 6,384; Referee: Gaël Angoula

3 September 2022 7	Paris FC	1–3	Bordeaux	Paris
15:00 CEST (UTC+2)	Guilavogui 78'	Report	Maja 13', 19' (pen.), 51' (pen.)	Stadium: Stade Sébastien Charléty; Attendance: 10,112; Referee: Jérémie Pignard

10 September 2022 8	Grenoble	0–2	Paris FC	Grenoble
19:00 CEST (UTC+2)	Bambock (yellow card) 54'; Sanyang 77'; Nestor (yellow card) 87'; Gersbach (yellow card) 87'	Report	Guilavogui 60'; Chahiri 88' (pen.); Dabila (yellow card) 90+3'	Stadium: Stade des Alpes; Attendance: 5,387; Referee: Abdelatif Kherradji

17 September 2022 9	Paris FC	1–2	Rodez	Paris
15:00 CEST (UTC+2)	Guilavogui 24' (pen.); Le Cardinal (yellow card) 77'; Dabila (yellow card) 80'	Report	Depres (yellow card) 14'; Vandenabeele 61'; Rajot (yellow card) 68'; Danger 81' (pen.)	Stadium: Stade Sébastien Charléty; Attendance: 2,467; Referee: Antoine Valnet

1 October 2022 10	Nîmes	0–1	Paris FC	Nîmes
19:00 CEST (UTC+2)		Report	Dabila (yellow card) 45'; Phiri (yellow card) 77'; Djiga 87' (o.g.)	Stadium: Stade des Costières; Attendance: 2,303; Referee: Mikael Lesage

8 October 2022 11	Paris FC	0–1	Valenciennes	Paris
19:00 CEST (UTC+2)	Dabila (yellow card) 50' (yellow-red card) 56'	Report	Diliberto 22'; Buatu (yellow card) 55'; Berthomier (yellow card) 80'	Stadium: Stade Sébastien Charléty; Attendance: 3,157; Referee: Faouzi Benchabane

15 October 2022 12	Saint-Étienne	0–2	Paris FC	Saint-Étienne
15:00 CET (UTC+1)	Bouchouari (yellow card) 31'; Chambost (yellow card) 36'	Report	Mandouki (yellow card) 36'; Le Cardinal 60'; Filipović (yellow card) 66' (yellow-red card) 76'; Chahiri 82'; Phiri (yellow card) 89'	Stadium: Stade Geoffroy-Guichard; Attendance: 18,412; Referee: Alexandre Perreau-Niel

22 October 2022 13	Paris FC	0–0	Laval	Paris
19:00 CEST (UTC+2)		Report	Baldé (yellow card) 5'	Stadium: Stade Sébastien Charléty; Attendance: 2,568; Referee: Abdelatif Kherradji

5 November 2022 14	Bastia	0–1	Paris FC	Furiani
19:00 CEST (UTC+2)	Guidi (yellow card) 41'; Ducrocq (yellow card) 72'; Kaïboué (yellow card) 88'	Report	Le Cardinal (yellow card) 26'; Guilavogui 34'	Stadium: Stade Armand-Cesari; Attendance: 10,498; Referee: Faouzi Benchabane

12 November 2022 15	Paris FC	1–4	Metz	Paris
19:00 CEST (UTC+2)	Chergui (yellow card) 21', (red card) 21'; Guilavogui 28'	Report	Mikautadze (penalty scored) 12', (penalty scored) 23', 82'; Gueye 63'; Kouyaté (yellow card) 90+1'	Stadium: Stade Sébastien Charléty; Attendance: 3,957; Referee: Nicolas Rainville

26 December 2022 16	Pau	0–1	Paris FC	Pau
21:00 CET (UTC+1)		Report	Guilavogui 25'	Stadium: Nouste Camp; Attendance: 3,549; Referee: Mikael Lesage

30 December 2022 17	Paris FC	0–0	Le Havre	Paris
21:00 CET (UTC+1)		Report	Alioui (yellow card) 90+1'	Stadium: Stade Sébastien Charléty; Attendance: 4,608; Referee: Olivier Thual

10 January 2022 18	Paris FC	2–1	Dijon	Paris
20:45 CET (UTC+1)	Iglesias 11'; Bernauer (yellow card) 19'; Gueho 90+3'	Report	Silva 62'; Traoré (red card) 84'; Le Bihan (yellow card) 90+3'	Stadium: Stade Sébastien Charléty; Attendance: 2,807; Referee: William Toulliou

13 January 2023 19	Annecy	2–0	Paris FC	Annecy
20:45 CET (UTC+1)	Kashi 40'; Billemaz (yellow card) 41'; Sahi 77'	Report	Bernauer (yellow card) 29'; Gueho (yellow card) 63'	Stadium: Parc des Sports; Attendance: 4,215; Referee: Abdelatif Kherradji

28 January 2023 20	Quevilly-Rouen	3–1	Paris FC	Le Petit-Quevilly
19:00 CET (UTC+1)	Sangaré 15', (yellow card) 41'; Ben Youssef (yellow card) 56'; Mafouta 62'; Soumaré (penalty scored) 87'	Report	Maçon (yellow card) 55'; Gueho (yellow card) 76'; López 82'; Guilavogui (yellow card) 86'	Stadium: Stade Robert Diochon; Attendance: 3,075; Referee: Rémi Landry

31 January 2022 21	Paris FC	0–1	Pau	Paris
20:45 CET (UTC+1)	Guilavogui (yellow card) 84'	Report	Abzi (yellow card) 75', (goal) 77'	Stadium: Stade Sébastien Charléty; Attendance: 2,072; Referee: Azzédine Souifi

3 February 2023 22	Le Havre	0–0	Paris FC	Le Havre
20:45 CET (UTC+1)	Opéri (yellow card) 86'	Report	Maçon (yellow card) 47'	Stadium: Stade Océane; Attendance: 12,372; Referee: Gaël Angoula

11 February 2023 23	Paris FC	P–P	Amiens	Paris
19:00 CET (UTC+1)				Stadium: Stade Sébastien Charléty
Note: Match postponed due to pitch condition.

18 February 2023 24	Bordeaux	2–1	Paris FC	Bordeaux
15:00 CET (UTC+1)	Bokele 24'; Barbet (penalty scored) 32'	Report	Maçon (yellow card) 26'; Boutaïb (yellow card) 30'; López 72'; Chergui (yellow card) 90+2'; Bernauer (yellow card) 90+3'; Guilavogui (yellow card) 90+6'	Stadium: Matmut Atlantique; Attendance: 17,439; Referee: Guillaume Paradis

25 February 2023 25	Paris FC	3–0	Niort	Paris
19:00 CET (UTC+1)	Guilavogui (penalty scored) 72', 86'; Kebbal 90+3'	Report	Renel (yellow card) 9'	Stadium: Stade Sébastien Charléty; Attendance: 2,205; Referee: William Toulliou

4 March 2023 26	Paris FC	1–2	Guingamp	Paris
19:00 CET (UTC+1)	Lasne (yellow card) 20'; Guilavogui 47'; Chergui (yellow card) 63'	Report	Picard 26'; Guillaume 32'	Stadium: Stade Sébastien Charléty; Attendance: 2,300; Referee: Aurélien Petit

11 March 2023 27	Laval	1–2	Paris FC	Laval
19:00 CET (UTC+1)	Elisor 18'; Ferhaoui (yellow card) 64'	Report	Kebbal 11'; Boutaïb (yellow card) 59'; Guilavogui 60'	Stadium: Stade Francis Le Basser; Attendance: 5,680; Referee: Antoine Valnet

14 March 2023 23	Paris FC	3–0	Amiens	Paris
19:00 CET (UTC+1)	Mandouki 30'; López 48'; Chergui 84'	Report		Stadium: Stade Sébastien Charléty; Attendance: 1,847; Referee: Benjamin Lepaysant

18 March 2023 28	Paris FC	0–1	Bastia	Paris
19:00 CET (UTC+1)	Chergui (yellow card) 56'	Report	Magri 66', (yellow card) 90+2'; Kaïboué (yellow card) 84'	Stadium: Stade Sébastien Charléty; Attendance: 3,957; Referee: Abdelatif Kherradji

1 April 2023 29	Valenciennes	4–5	Paris FC	Valenciennes
19:00 CEST (UTC+2)	Grbić 5', 45+1'; Masson (yellow card) 40'; Kaba 62'; Lecoeuche (yellow card) 72'; Buatu 85'	Report	Guilavogui 33', 38', 58', (yellow card) 43'; Koré 80'; Boutaïb 90'	Stadium: Stade Nungesser; Attendance: 9,908; Referee: Gaël Angoula

8 April 2023 30	Paris FC	2–4	Saint-Étienne	Paris
19:00 CEST (UTC+2)	Hamel 14'; Iglesias 32'; Guilavogui (yellow card) 64'; Chergui (yellow card) 68'	Report	Wadji 1'; Nkounkou 35', 63'; Sow (yellow card) 36'; Fomba (yellow card) 57'; Krasso (penalty scored) 69'; Cafaro (yellow card) 76'	Stadium: Stade Sébastien Charléty; Attendance: 10,727; Referee: Azzédine Souifi

15 April 2023 31	Caen	3–1	Paris FC	Caen
19:00 CEST (UTC+2)	Mendy 16'; Chergui 45' (o.g.); Kyeremeh 75'	Report	Kanté (yellow card) 68'; Lefort (yellow card) 75'; Ntim 82' (o.g.)	Stadium: Stade Michel d'Ornano; Attendance: 12,537; Referee: Aurélien Petit

22 April 2023 32	Paris FC	3–0	Nîmes	Paris
19:00 CEST (UTC+2)	Kebbal 41', 84'; Chahiri 81'	Report		Stadium: Stade Sébastien Charléty; Attendance: 3,252; Referee: Alexandre Perreau-Niel

29 April 2023 33	Metz	1–1	Paris	Metz
19:00 CEST (UTC+2)	Mikautadze 18' (pen.)	Report	Guilavogui 13', (yellow card) 78'; Maçon (yellow card) 17'; Lefort (yellow card) 78'	Stadium: Stade Saint-Symphorien; Attendance: 20,900; Referee: Pierre Legat

6 May 2023 34	Paris FC	1–0	Grenoble	Paris
19:00 CEST (UTC+2)	Boutaïb 6'	Report		Stadium: Stade Sébastien Charléty; Attendance: 3,429; Referee: Antoine Valnet

13 May 2023 35	Rodez	0–0	Paris FC	Rodez
19:00 CEST (UTC+2)	Depres (yellow card) 66'	Report	Guilavogui (yellow card) 39'	Stadium: Stade Paul-Lignon; Attendance: 2,900; Referee: Aurélien Petit

20 May 2023 36	Paris FC	2–1	Sochaux	Paris
19:00 CEST (UTC+2)	Guilavogui (yellow card) 60', (goal) 81'; Hamel 90'	Report	Alvero 27', (yellow card) 90+2'	Stadium: Stade Sébastien Charléty; Attendance: 4,762; Referee: Faouzi Benchabane

26 May 2023 37	Dijon	1–1	Paris FC	Dijon
19:00 CEST (UTC+2)	Aké 48'; Soumaré (yellow card) 56'	Report	López 57'	Stadium: Stade Gaston Gérard; Attendance: 14,210; Referee: Ruddy Buquet

2 June 2023 38	Paris FC	1–0	Annecy	Paris
20:45 CEST (UTC+2)	López 65'	Report	Mouanga (yellow card) 72'	Stadium: Stade Sébastien Charléty; Attendance: 5,412; Referee: Karim Abed

=== Coupe de France ===
29 October 2022 Seventh round	CO Les Ulis	1–3	Paris FC	Les Ulis
14:00 CEST (UTC+2)	Lukasi 83'	Report	Caddy 21', 56'; Gory 80'	Stadium: Stade Jean-Marc Salinier; Attendance: 1,000; Referee: Arnaud Baert

19 November 2022 Eighth round	Union Cosnoise Sportive	0–2	Paris FC	Cosne-Cours-sur-Loire
17:00 CET (UTC+1)		Report	Guilavogui 5'; Gory 84'	Stadium: Stade Raphaël Giraux; Attendance: 2,167; Referee: William Toulliou

6 January 2023 Round of 64	Paris FC	3–1	Valenciennes	Paris
18:00 CET (UTC+1)	Caddy 28'; Chahiri 49'; Guilavogui 69'	Report	Berthomier 16'	Stadium: Stade Sébastien Charléty; Attendance: 2,614; Referee: Guillaume Paradis

21 January 2023 Round of 32	FC Chamalières	0–4	Paris FC	Clermont-Ferrand
18:00 CET (UTC+1)		Report	Caddy 40'; López 42'; Guilavogui 70'; Dabila 73'	Stadium: Stade Gabriel Montpied; Attendance: 3,535; Referee: Florent Batta

8 February 2023 Round of 16	Paris FC	1–1 (5–6 p)	Annecy	Paris
18:15 CET (UTC+1)	Boutaïb 90+1'	Report	Farade 67' (pen.)	Stadium: Stade Sébastien Charléty; Attendance: 4,216; Referee: Pierre Gaillouste
	Penalties
	Boutaïb (penalty scored); Caddy (penalty scored); Kebbal (penalty missed); Phiri (penalty scored); Mandouki (penalty missed); Koré (penalty scored); Hanin (penalty scored); Chergui (penalty missed)		(penalty scored) Farade; (penalty scored) Mouanga; (penalty missed) Testud; (penalty scored) El Jaouhari; (penalty missed) Billemaz; (penalty scored) Jean; (penalty scored) Goncalves; (penalty scored) Temanfo
