= Aymes =

Aymes is an English surname. Notable people with this name include:

- Adrian Aymes (born 1964), British cricketer
- Jean-Marc Aymes (born 1961), French musician
- Jérémy Aymes (born 1988), French footballer
- Julian Aymes (1917–1992), British director and producer
- Thiérry Aymes (born 1973), French gymnast
