= Caterina Assandra =

Italian composer

Caterina Assandra (c. 1590 – after 1618) was an Italian composer and Benedictine nun. In her surviving motet book, Motetti a due a tre voci op.2, Assandra alludes to her birthplace being in the Province of Pavia. She became famous as an organist and published various works during her lifetime. Her work Motetti a due was dedicated to G.B. Biglia, the Bishop of Pavia, and was first recognized by publisher Lomazzo. Although Assandra had accumulated a substantial reputation for her works as a composer, even reaching outside the borders of Italy, she was at times confused with an 18th-century composer with the same name. And although the date of her birth is approximate, the date of her death is still unknown.

== Early life ==
Assandra composed a number of motets and organ pieces, written in German tablature. She studied counterpoint with Benedetto Re, or Reggio, one of the leading teachers at Pavia Cathedral, who dedicated a piece to her in 1607. Re may have been an exiled German Catholic. Assandra's musical talents were noted by the publisher Lomazzo early in her career, in his dedication of the works of Giovanni Paolo Cima. She composed many works during the first half of the 17th century, including Promptuarium Musicum and Siren Colestis. In 1609, Assandra took vows and entered the Benedictine monastery of Saint Agata in Lomello, in the Lombard region of northern Italy. She adopted "Agata" as her religious name and continued composing, including a collection of motets in the new stile concertato in Milan in 1609, an imitative eight-voice Salve Regina in 1611, and a motet, Audite verbum Dominum, for four voices in 1618. After entering the convent, Assandra published no new books of music. Caterina Assandra was the first Italian nun to have an entire collection of musical works published, following Raffaella Aleotti.

== Career ==
Two of her compositions from Op. 2 appeared in German publications during the decade and a half following their original appearance. Two works by her, otherwise unknown, also appear in German tablature in a manuscript located in the Fürst Thurn und Taxis Hofbibliothek (court library) in Regensburg. Assandra's motets were among the first in the Roman style to be published in Milan, as Borsieri noted. Researchers suggest Borsieri must have heard in her music the influence of Agazzari, whose small-scale works had recently been published in the city. She composed both highly traditional pieces and more innovative works. Among the latter is Duo seraphim. Her motet O Salutaris hostia, included in Motetti op. 2, was one of the first pieces to include 'violone'.

== Personal life ==
Two influential figures to Caterina's style were her teacher, Re, and local composer Agazzari. Due to her living in the convent and the likeness between the written bass and continuo parts, her motets were able to be performed and function without male singers, though they were often written for two sopranos, alto, bass, and continuo. On February 20 of 1606, publisher Giovanni Paolo Cima dedicated a portion of his Partito de Ficercari & Canzoni Alla Francese to Caterina. This is the composer's first known mention and is as follows: "To the very excellent and most virtuous lady and my very obliging and benign Mistress: Caterina Assandra".

== Works, editions and recordings ==
- Op. 1 is lost. It is possible that her two motets, Ave Verum Corpus and Ego Flos Campi, could be from that volume.
- Motetti à due, & tre voci, Op. 2, dedicated to G. B. Biglia, the Bishop of Pavia, in 1609, has survived.
- Il Canto delle Dame, a 2010 recording by María Cristina Kiehr, Jean-Marc Aymes, and Concerto Soave, includes four pieces from the Motetti of 1608: Duo Seraphim, Canzon a 4, O quam suavis, and O salutaris hostia.
- Ave verum corpus. Unknown publish date
- Canzon a 4 (for Benedetto Re) written for voice and ensemble
- Duo Seraphim written for 3 voices and continuo
- Ego flos campi
- Haec dies written in 1609 for 2 to 3 voices
- Impleos nostrum motet written for 3 voices
- Jubilate Deo written in 1609
- O Dulcis Amor Jesu motet written for 3 voices
- O quam suavis written for voice and ensemble
- O Salutaris hostia written for voice and ensemble
- Salve Regina motet written for 8 voices

== Sources ==
- "Assandra, Caterina (Early 1590s-1620)." Assandra, Caterina (Early 1590s-1620) | Women Composers 1 | Alexander Street, search.alexanderstreet.com
- Bowers, Jane; Judith Tick. Women Making Music. University of Illinois Press (1986). ISBN 0-252-01470-7
- Cessac, Catherine. Il Canto delle Dame, liner notes. Centre culturel de rencontre d'Ambronay (2010).
- Eckart Tscheuschner, Die Neresheimer Orgeltabulaturen der Fürstlich Thurn und Taxisschen Hofbibliothek zu Regensburg (Erlangen, 1963), 107.
- Jump up^ Listen: Ego Flos Campi (H.Heldstab), "Archived copy". Archived from the original on 2016-03-03. Retrieved 2015-10-19.
- Women Composers: Music Through the Ages.
