= Kouadio-Yves Dabila =

Ivorian footballer (born 1997)

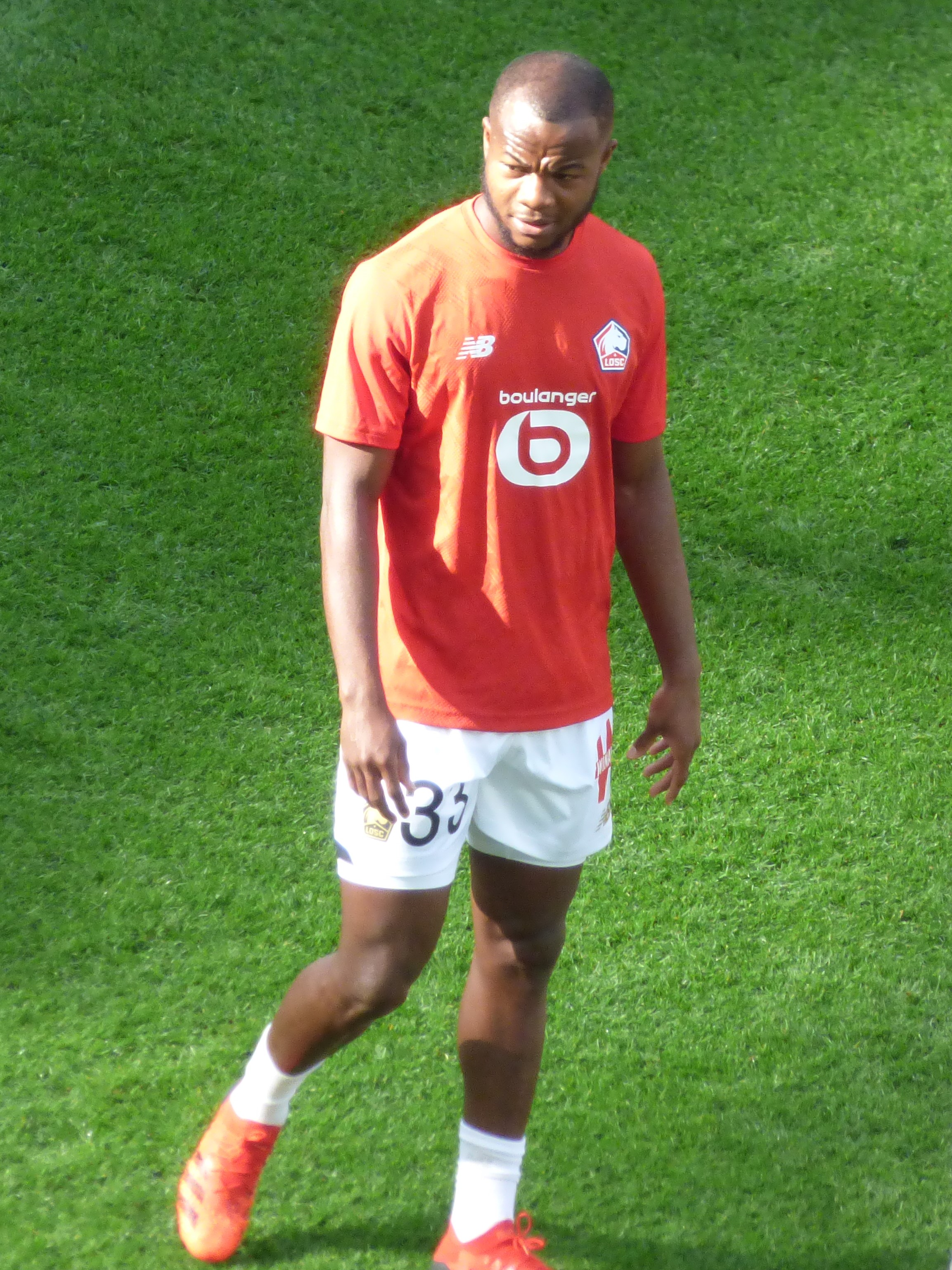
- Dabila in 2021

Personal information
- Date of birth: 1 January 1997 (age 29)
- Place of birth: Kouassi-Datékro, Ivory Coast
- Height: 1.83 m (6 ft 0 in)
- Position: Defender

Team information
- Current team: FC Gifu
- Number: 2

Youth career
- –2014: Cissé Institut FC
- 2014–2017: Monaco

Senior career*
Years	Team	Apps	(Gls)
2015–2017	Monaco B	59	(2)
2017	Monaco	0	(0)
2017–2022	Lille B	19	(1)
2017–2022	Lille	24	(0)
2019–2020	→ Cercle Brugge (loan)	21	(1)
2020–2021	→ Mouscron (loan)	7	(0)
2022	→ Seraing (loan)	12	(0)
2022–2024	Paris FC	41	(2)
2023	Paris FC B	1	(0)
2026–	FC Gifu	0	(0)

International career
2019	Ivory Coast U23	5	(1)
2021	Ivory Coast Olympic	4	(0)
- * Club domestic league appearances and goals as of 15:45, 22 March 2026 (UTC)

Kouadio-Yves Dabila (born 1 January 1997) is an Ivorian professional footballer who plays as a defender for J3 League club FC Gifu.

== Club career ==
=== Monaco ===
Dabila made his professional debut on 26 April 2017 in a Coupe de France semi-final against Paris Saint-Germain, replacing Andrea Raggi in the 60th minute of a 5–0 away loss.

=== Lille ===
In summer 2017, Dabila joined Lille on his first professional contract.

On 15 July 2019, Lille loaned Dabila to Cercle Brugge in the Belgian First Division A for the 2019–20 season.

Dabila signed for Mouscron on a season-long loan in August 2020. In January 2022, he was loaned out to Belgium once again, this time to Seraing.

=== Paris FC ===
In August 2022, he signed for Ligue 2 club Paris FC until 2024 on a permanent deal.

=== FC Gifu ===
In November 2026, it was announced that Dabila had signed for J3 League club FC Gifu.

== International career ==
Dabila was called up to the senior Ivory Coast squad for a friendly against Togo in March 2018. He debuted for the Ivory Coast U23s in a pair of 2019 Africa U-23 Cup of Nations qualification matches in March 2019.

== Career statistics ==
As of match played 21 May 2024

Appearances and goals by club, season and competition
Club	Season	League			National cup		Other		Total	
Club	Season	Division	Apps	Goals	Apps	Goals	Apps	Goals	Apps	Goals
Monaco B	2014–15	Championnat de France Amateur	9	0	—		—		9	0
Monaco B	2015–16	Championnat de France Amateur	25	2	—		—		25	2
Monaco B	2016–17	Championnat de France Amateur	25	0	—		—		25	0
Monaco B	Total		59	2	—		—		59	2
Monaco	2016–17	Ligue 1	0	0	1	0	0	0	1	0
Lille B	2017–18	Championnat National 2	11	1	—		—		11	1
Lille B	2018–19	Championnat National 2	2	0	—		—		2	0
Lille B	2021–22	Championnat National 3	6	0	—		—		6	0
Lille B	Total		19	1	—		—		19	1
Lille	2017–18	Ligue 1	12	0	2	0	1 (Note: Appearance in the Coupe de la Ligue)	0	15	0
Lille	2018–19	Ligue 1	12	0	3	0	1	0	16	0
Lille	2021–22	Ligue 1	0	0	1	0	0	0	1	0
Lille	Total		24	0	6	0	2	0	32	0
Cercle Brugge (loan)	2019–20	Belgian First Division A	21	1	0	0	—		21	1
Mouscron (loan)	2020–21	Belgian First Division A	7	0	0	0	—		7	0
Seraing (loan)	2021–22	Belgian First Division A	12	0	0	0	2 (Note: Appearances in the Belgian First Division A promotion-relegation play-offs)	0	14	0
Paris FC	2022–23	Ligue 2	10	0	3	1	—		13	1
Paris FC	2023–24	Ligue 2	31	2	4	0	1 (Note: Appearance in the Ligue 2 promotion play-off)	1	36	3
Paris FC	Total		41	2	7	1	1	1	49	4
Paris FC B	2022–23	Championnat National 3	1	0	—		—		1	0
Career total			184	6	14	1	5	1	203	8

== Honours ==
Ivory Coast U23

- Africa U-23 Cup of Nations runner-up: 2019
