= Yann Gueho =

French footballer

Personal information
- Date of birth: 29 November 1994 (age 31)
- Position: Winger

Youth career
- Years: Team
- CAP Charenton
- Créteil
- 2007–2008: INF Clairefontaine
- 2008: Lille
- 2008–2009: Paris FC
- 2009–2011: Chelsea
- 2011: Nantes
- 2012: Bastia
- 2015: Paris FC

Yann Gueho (born 29 November 1994) is a French former footballer who played as a winger. Having retired from the game before making a professional appearance, Gueho is known more for his high potential which saw him compared to footballing superstars Lionel Messi, Neymar and Kylian Mbappé, amongst others.

== Early and personal life ==
Gueho was born on 29 November 1994 to Anne-Marie and Jean-Pierre Gueho, who met while playing handball. The third of six siblings, his younger brother Loup-Diwan is a professional footballer, currently playing for Cannes, on loan from Bastia.

As a child, Gueho was also a talented tennis player, but his temperament would often cause issues, and after his first defeat, his mother recalls that he vomited and didn't move out of anger, asking "when am I going to play against him again?" These anger issues extended into his footballing career, and while at Chelsea, former teammate John Swift recounted times where he would throw table tennis bats or break pool cues out of frustration.

Gueho's disruptive nature led to him seeing a psychologist from the age of nine. Initially diagnosed in France with "middle-child syndrome", a claim his mother rejects, and after causing issues with teammates during his time with Lille, another psychologist offered a different diagnosis, though Gueho was unwilling to take the medication he had been prescribed. He was diagnosed with bipolar disorder in 2016, after his footballing career was over, spending three months in a psychiatric hospital. As a result of his treatment for bipolar disorder, his physical capabilities were reduced to 10%, leaving him vulnerable.

On the night of 9 November 2025, he was attacked with a knife in Choisy-le-Roi, with a man and a woman being arrested. The man was later charged with attempted murder and gang violence, while the woman was charged with gang violence. On 20 November 2025, Gueho was described by French newspaper L'Équipe as being "hospitalised, but conscious," after being "seriously wounded."

== Career ==
=== Early career in France ===
Gueho began his career with CAP Charenton, where his coach, Jean-Francois Godin, described him as a "genius". He would reportedly do so many kick-ups for so long that Godin would have to ask him to stop. His ability attracted the attention of Créteil, where he would often refuse the instruction of his coach, El Hadad Himidi, to track back and defend – something which would prove a common theme during his career. Such was his ability that clubs would rely heavily on him, with former teammate at Créteil, Damien Dussaut, recalling a story where the team lost 6–1 to Paris Saint-Germain without Gueho, but won 2–0 on his return; Gueho scoring both goals. His parents would try to discipline him by threatening that he not play football, but coaches would call them, insisting he play despite his behaviour.

"The fact that he didn't manage to turn pro never made us bitter, simply because Yann had never expressed the dream of doing so. He never asked the French national team for autographs at Clairefontaine, for example, just their cleats."

— Jean-Pierre Gueho, Yann's father.

Invited to the prestigious INF Clairefontaine football centre – an honour reserved for the brightest young French talent – Gueho refused to play in the full-back role he was initially assigned to. Despite the Clairefontaine coach threatening him with not taking part in the game, Gueho shrugged his shoulders, with the coach changing his mind and playing Gueho in a more forward role. Described by fellow Clairefontaine student Amadou Diallo as the "best of [their] generation", Gueho was eventually expelled from the training centre after seven months, having threatened a teacher at the Rambouillet secondary school. A short spell with Lille followed at the age of thirteen, before Gueho eventually settled at Paris FC.

=== Chelsea ===
Gueho's performances, including those at the regional section of the 2009 Nike Cup, drew the attention of Chelsea's French scout, Guy Hillion. Hillion had already been responsible for Chelsea's signing of fellow French winger Gaël Kakuta, and after scoring in a trial game against West Ham, Chelsea offered Gueho a contract. Gueho's academy progress report at the end of his first season described him as a "very gifted player" with "superb dribbling skills", but noted that "neglecting his defensive responsibilities [led] to animosity amongst team-mates".

Gueho was monitored heavily at Chelsea, with Hillion reassuring his mother that the club were aware of his character. He received support from the club's first-team psychologist, and had been provided with a home in Raynes Park by the club, where he lived with his mother and three younger siblings, with his father travelling in from France each weekend to watch him play. The club would send nutritionist Nick Broad and academy coach Adi Viveash to try and calm Gueho during his outbursts, but Viveash would later comment that "you never knew with Yann where you were", and that he was "a troubled young person."

Gueho was involved in first-team training on at least one occasion, despite being only fourteen or fifteen at the time. During these training sessions, Gueho would not shy away from his flamboyant playing style, and spent the time nutmegging senior players – something which was seen as disrespectful, with experienced first team player Ricardo Carvalho reprimanding him after falling victim to Gueho's skill. Gueho's behaviour culminated during an in-house friendly match involving trialists in April 2011; after being dribbled past by a trialist, Gueho kicked him, leading to a physical altercation that ended with Gueho on top of the other player. The game had been attended by first-team coaches, and as this was another in a long list of incidents, Chelsea cut ties with Gueho.

=== Return to France ===
After a trial with Fulham amounted to nothing, Gueho returned to France, signing with Nantes in the summer of 2011, where Guy Hillion was now serving as director. Gueho's spell with Nantes was short-lived, as he would often clash with coaches and teammates during the three months he spent with the club, arrive late for training and often not do schoolwork. Following his first arrest in late 2011, his agent, Housseini Niakate, persuaded the French judiciary system to allow him to join Ligue 1 club Bastia the following year, where he was roommates with future FIFA World Cup winner Florian Thauvin. However, his time at Bastia was also short-lived, and he spent most of his time playing tennis and neglecting rehabilitation for an injury he had suffered. His last chance in football came with former club Paris FC, where he joined the club's reserve team in early 2015, but again he seemingly did not take this opportunity seriously, spending three months wearing running shoes instead of football boots, before leaving the club.

== Style of play ==
"Real arrogance bordering on genius, Yann would nutmeg someone and then want to put it back through the other way. But it wasn’t just the nutmeg. He was able to flick it up in the air, knock it over someone’s head and then volley it back over their head as they went towards the ball."

— Chelsea youth coach Adi Viveash on 15-year-old Gueho during his time in the club's academy.

A quick, powerful winger, Gueho was known for his arrogance and nonchalance during his footballing career, with former Chelsea teammate Adam Nditi stating that "if the coach told him he was taking too many touches [during training games], he would just boot the ball and walk in." In a game for Nantes between the club's reserves and under-19 squad, Gueho, playing for the under-19s, dribbled past a number of the reserve team players before scoring from 35 metres, equalising the game at 1–1, before turning to his coach and asking "it’s OK now?" In a game against Angers, former Nantes goalkeeper Théo Bachelier noted that Gueho, one-on-one with the goalkeeper, waited with the ball until defenders had got back, before beating them again and scoring.

He had a penchant for rainbow flicks and nutmegs, difficult skills involving flicking the ball over one's head, or playing it between the legs of an opposition player. During a youth game at Chelsea's Cobham Training Centre, former Chelsea player Jérémie Boga recalled Gueho walking over to the touchline during a game to inform Boga's brother, Daniel, that he would perform three nutmegs on opposition players, which he then did. This was not the first occasion he had done this; in a youth game for Paris FC, after the opposition coach had told one of his players to man-mark Gueho, Gueho approached the coach and told him he would nutmeg said player three times. After doing so, he proceeded to leave the pitch.

== Legal issues ==
Gueho had issues with discipline and the company he kept from a young age. Former teammate at Nantes, Khalil Lambin, who also grew up nearby in Maisons-Alfort, stated that, despite growing up in a nice neighbourhood, Gueho would often seek out local troublemakers and petty criminals to hang out with. During his time with Chelsea, despite being given a ticket pass to get to Cobham, Gueho would often jump the ticket barrier, which at one point led to a physical altercation with a staff member.

On 29 November 2011, his seventeenth birthday, Gueho and an accomplice entered a perfume shop only 500 metres from his home in Maisons-Alfort. The pair came away with €30 and thirty-four bottles of perfume, and Gueho was arrested days later. He refused to give up the name of his accomplice, leading to a longer sentence, and despite being under-age, he refused to serve his time in a juvenile detention centre, opting instead to spend the time in a prison.

During his time in prison he began taking drugs, worsening the symptoms of his then-undiagnosed bipolar disorder. He continued to play football in prison, and was tasked with organising a squad to play against other teams. After scoring a hat-trick against a fifth-division club, the manager attempted to recruit Gueho, asking prison officials if there were any way he could play, even with an electronic tag. On 10 December 2012, either during or after his time with Bastia, Gueho and a friend from Grigny robbed a couple in their home, and Gueho was again arrested.

On 29 March 2013, he physically assaulted a man, before attacking police officers sent to arrest him four days later, being sent to Fleury-Mérogis Prison. Following his release on 5 December 2014, it only took four months for Gueho to be arrested again, this time for assaulting police officers while intoxicated. During his time in Fresnes Prison, he would tell his parents not to visit, due to the cramped conditions of the visiting room, though he would post videos on social media, displaying his skills with an orange, instead of a football. In total, he spent 75 months in the French prison system.
