= Ivan Filipović (footballer) =

Croatian footballer (born 1994)

Personal information
- Date of birth: 13 November 1994 (age 31)
- Place of birth: Slavonski Brod, Croatia
- Height: 1.97 m (6 ft 6 in)
- Position: Goalkeeper

Team information
- Current team: Dinamo Zagreb
- Number: 44

Youth career
- 2003–2011: Graničar Županja
- 2011–2012: Cibalia

Senior career*
Years	Team	Apps	(Gls)
2012–2015	Cibalia	52	(0)
2015–2018	Lokomotiva Zagreb	6	(0)
2017–2018	→ Sesvete (loan)	30	(0)
2018–2021	Slaven Belupo	77	(0)
2021–2024	Paris FC	32	(0)
2024–	Dinamo Zagreb	10	(0)
2025	→ Šibenik (loan)	14	(0)
- * Club domestic league appearances and goals as of 1 August 2026

Ivan Filipović (born 13 November 1994) is a Croatian professional footballer who plays as a goalkeeper for Dinamo Zagreb.

== Club career ==
Filipović began his career with the youth academies of Graničar Županja and Cibalia, before beginning his senior career with Cibalia in 2012. He transferred to Lokomotiva Zagreb on 30 June 2015, where he was primarily the backup goalkeeper. He made his professional debut with Lokomotiva Zagreb in a 2–1 Croatian First Football League loss to Inter Zaprešić on 21 August 2015. For the 2017–18 season, he went on loan with Sesvete. On 19 June 2018, he transferred to Slaven Belupo where he was consistently their starting goalkeeper. On 30 June 2021, he transferred to the French club Paris FC in the Ligue 2.

== Career statistics ==
As of match played 4 October 2026

Appearances and goals by club, season and competition
Club	Season	League			Cup		Europe		Other		Total	
Club	Season	Division	Apps	Goals	Apps	Goals	Apps	Goals	Apps	Goals	Apps	Goals
Cibalia	2013–14	First Football League	32	0	—		—		2 (Note: Appearance(s) in Croatian Football League relegation play-off)	0	34	0
Cibalia	2014–15	First Football League	20	0	1	0	—		—		21	0
Cibalia	Total		52	0	1	0	—		2	0	55	0
Lokomotiva Zagreb	2015–16	Croatian Football League	2	0	—		0	0	—		2	0
Lokomotiva Zagreb	2016–17	Croatian Football League	2	0	2	0	4 (Note: Appearance(s) in UEFA Europa League)	0	—		8	0
Lokomotiva Zagreb	2017–18	Croatian Football League	2	0	—		—		—		2	0
Lokomotiva Zagreb	Total		6	0	2	0	4	0	—		12	0
Sesvete (loan)	2017–18	Croatian Football League	30	0	0	0	—		—		30	0
Slaven Belupo	2018–19	Croatian Football League	24	0	3	0	—		—		27	0
Slaven Belupo	2019–20	Croatian Football League	18	0	2	0	—		—		20	0
Slaven Belupo	2020–21	Croatian Football League	35	0	3	0	—		—		38	0
Slaven Belupo	Total		77	0	8	0	—		—		85	0
Paris FC	2021–22	Ligue 2	5	0	2	0	—		0	0	7	0
Paris FC	2022–23	Ligue 2	18	0	0	0	—		—		18	0
Paris FC	2023–24	Ligue 2	9	0	3	0	—		—		12	0
Paris FC	Total		23	0	5	0	—		0	0	25	0
Dinamo Zagreb	2024–25	Croatian Football League	0	0	1	0	0	0	—		1	0
Dinamo Zagreb	2025–26	Croatian Football League	9	0	4	0	3	0	—		16	0
Dinamo Zagreb	2026–27	Croatian Football League	1	0	2	0	4 (Note: Appearance(s) in UEFA Champions League)	0	—		7	0
Dinamo Zagreb	Total		10	0	7	0	7	0	—		24	0
Šibenik (loan)	2024–25	Croatian Football League	14	0	—		—		—		14	0
Career total			221	0	23	0	11	0	2	0	259	0
