= Alimami Gory =

French footballer (born 1996)

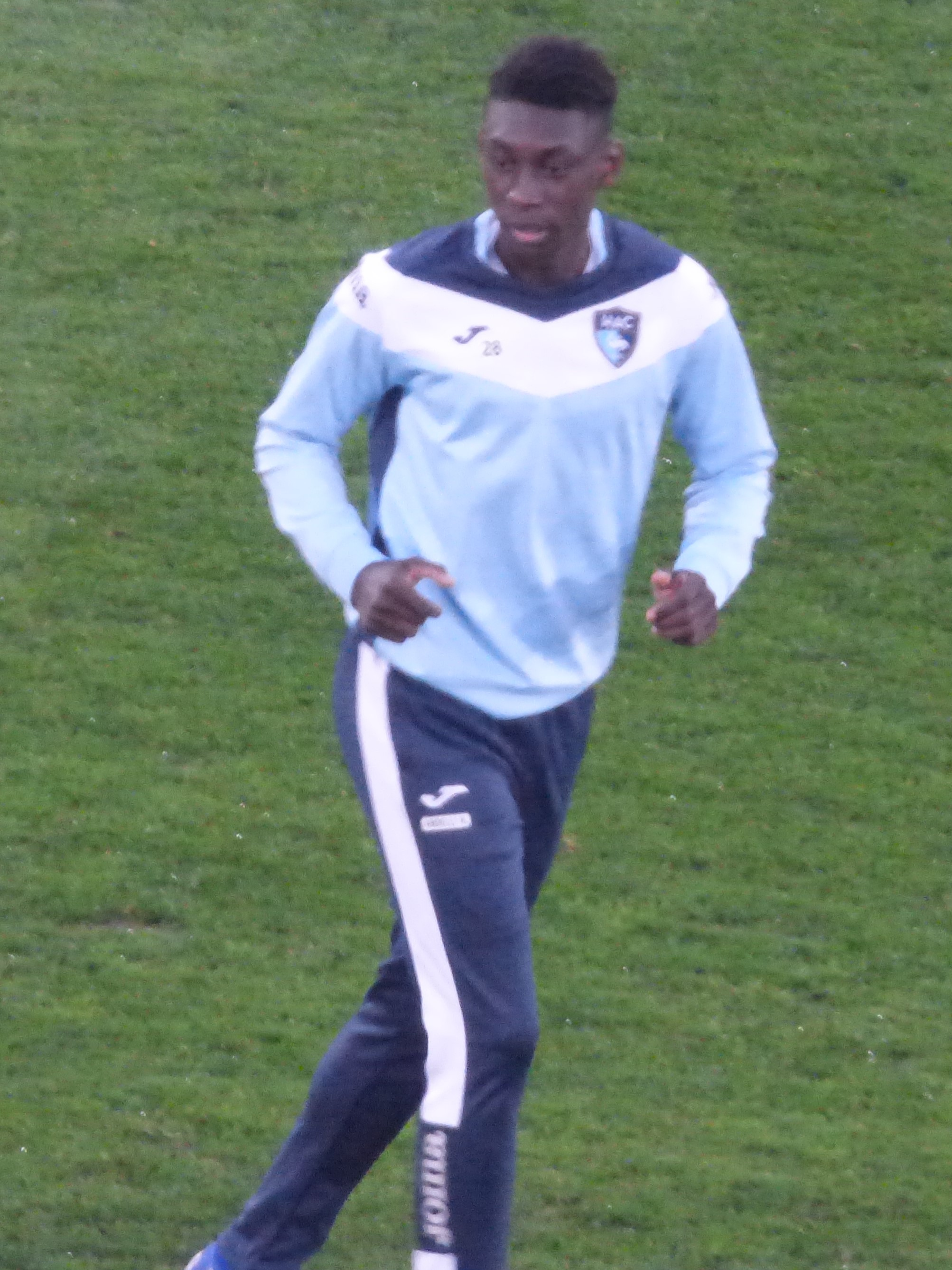
- Gory with Le Havre in 2019

Personal information
- Date of birth: 30 August 1996 (age 30)
- Place of birth: Le Havre, France
- Height: 1.82 m (6 ft 0 in)
- Position: Left winger

Team information
- Current team: Abha Club
- Number: 11

Youth career
- –2015: Le Havre

Senior career*
Years	Team	Apps	(Gls)
2013–2018	Le Havre B	48	(22)
2016–2019	Le Havre	74	(14)
2019–2022	Cercle Brugge	21	(2)
2020–2021	→ Troyes (loan)	26	(5)
2021–2022	→ Paris FC (loan)	17	(3)
2021	→ Paris FC B (loan)	1	(0)
2022–2026	Paris FC	109	(16)
2026–	Abha Club	7	(2)
- * Club domestic league appearances and goals as of 16 October 2026

Alimami Gory (born 30 August 1996) is a French professional footballer who plays as a left winger for Saudi Pro League club Abha Club.

== Club career ==
Gory is a youth exponent from Le Havre. He made his first team debut on 12 August 2016 against Gazélec Ajaccio replacing Ghislain Gimbert after 70 minutes.

On 1 September 2021, he joined Paris FC on loan with an option to buy. On 9 July 2022, Gory returned to Paris FC on a permanent basis and signed a two-year contract. He scored his first Ligue 1 goal for Paris in the stoppage-time of a 3–2 defeat against Strasbourg on 21 September 2025. On 17 May 2026, he netted a brace in a 2–1 win over Paris Saint-Germain, securing his club's first-ever league win in the Paris derby.

== International career ==
Gory was born in Le Havre, France. He holds French and Malian nationalities. In October 2018 he received his first call-up to the Mali senior national team.

== Career statistics ==
As of 17 May 2026

Appearances and goals by club, season, and competition
Club	Season	League			National cup (Note: Includes Coupe de France)		Other		Total	
Club	Season	Division	Apps	Goals	Apps	Goals	Apps	Goals	Apps	Goals
Le Havre B	2013–14	Championnat de France Amateur 2	2	0	—		—		2	0
Le Havre B	2014–15	Championnat de France Amateur 2	7	0	—		—		7	0
Le Havre B	2015–16	Championnat de France Amateur 2	22	15	—		—		22	15
Le Havre B	2016–17	Championnat de France Amateur	10	3	—		—		10	3
Le Havre B	2017–18	Championnat National 2	7	4	—		—		7	4
Le Havre B			48	22	—		—		48	22
Le Havre	2016–17	Ligue 2	17	2	0	0	1 (Note: Appearance(s) in Coupe de la Ligue)	0	18	2
Le Havre	2017–18	Ligue 2	23	4	0	0	2 (Note: Appearance(s) in Ligue 2 promotion play-offs)	0	25	4
Le Havre	2018–19	Ligue 2	34	8	2	1	4	2	40	11
Le Havre	Total		74	14	2	1	7	2	83	17
Cercle Brugge	2019–20	Belgian First Division A	19	2	0	0	—		19	2
Cercle Brugge	2020–21	Belgian First Division A	2	0	0	0	—		2	0
Cercle Brugge	Total		21	2	0	0	—		21	2
Troyes (loan)	2020–21	Ligue 2	26	5	0	0	—		26	5
Paris FC (loan)	2021–22	Ligue 2	17	3	1	0	1	0	19	3
Paris FC B (loan)	2021–22	Championnat National 3	1	0	—		—		1	0
Paris FC	2022–23	Ligue 2	26	0	5	2	—		31	2
Paris FC	2023–24	Ligue 2	29	7	4	0	0	0	33	7
Paris FC	2024–25	Ligue 2	30	4	1	0	—		31	4
Paris FC	2025–26	Ligue 1	24	5	1	0	—		25	5
Paris FC	Total		109	16	11	2	0	0	120	18
Career total			296	62	14	3	8	2	318	67

== Honours ==
Troyes

- Ligue 2: 2020–21
