= Lohann Doucet =

Burkinabe footballer (born 2002)

Personal information
- Date of birth: 14 September 2002 (age 24)
- Place of birth: Le Loroux-Bottereau, France
- Height: 1.80 m (5 ft 11 in)
- Position: Defensive midfielder

Team information
- Current team: Vitória de Guimarães
- Number: 44

Youth career
- Elan Sorinières Football
- 2005–2012: Landreau Loroux OSC
- 2012–2021: Nantes

Senior career*
| Years | Team | Apps | (Gls) |
| 2021–2024 | Nantes B | 35 | (1) |
| 2021–2024 | Nantes | 11 | (0) |
| 2023–2024 | → Paris FC (loan) | 29 | (0) |
| 2024–2026 | Paris FC | 64 | (3) |
| 2026 | → Dunkerque (loan) | 12 | (0) |
| 2026– | Vitória de Guimarães | 0 | (0) |

International career^{‡}
| 2026– | Burkina Faso | 1 | (0) |
- * Club domestic league appearances and goals as of 11 May 2026 ‡ National team caps and goals as of 15:29, 24 April 2026 (UTC)

Lohann Doucet (born 14 September 2002) is a professional footballer who plays as a defensive midfielder for Primeira Liga club Vitória de Guimarães. Born in France, he plays for the Burkina Faso national team.

== Career ==
Doucet is a youth product of Elan Sorinières Football and Landreau Loroux OSC before joining the youth academy of Nantes in 2012. He signed his first professional contract with Nantes on 8 December 2021. He made his professional debut with Nantes in a 1–1 Ligue 1 tie with Brest on 10 April 2022, coming on as a late sub in the 92nd minute.

On 3 August 2023, Doucet joined Paris FC in Ligue 2 on a season-long loan.

On 21 January 2026, Doucet moved on loan to Dunkerque.

On 14 July 2026, He signs for Vitória de Guimarães on a 3-year contract.

== International career ==
Born in France, Doucet is of Burkinabé descent. He was called up to the Burkina Faso national team for a set of friendlies in March 2026.

== Career statistics ==
As of match played 21 May 2024

Appearances and goals by club, season, and competition
| Club | Season | League | | | Cup | | Other | | Total | |
| Club | Season | Division | Apps | Goals | Apps | Goals | Apps | Goals | Apps | Goals |
|---|---|---|---|---|---|---|---|---|---|---|
| Nantes B | 2021–22 | National 2 | 18 | 0 | — | | — | | 18 | 0 |
| Nantes B | 2022–23 | National 2 | 17 | 1 | — | | — | | 17 | 1 |
| Nantes B | Total | | 35 | 1 | — | | — | | 35 | 1 |
| Nantes | 2021–22 | Ligue 1 | 2 | 0 | 1 | 0 | — | | 3 | 0 |
| Nantes | 2022–23 | Ligue 1 | 9 | 0 | 2 | 0 | 0 | 0 | 11 | 0 |
| Nantes | Total | | 11 | 0 | 3 | 0 | 0 | 0 | 14 | 0 |
| Paris FC (loan) | 2023–24 | Ligue 2 | 29 | 0 | 3 | 0 | 1 (Note: Appearance in the Ligue 2 promotion play-offs) | 0 | 33 | 0 |
| Career total | | | 75 | 1 | 6 | 0 | 1 | 0 | 82 | 1 |
