= Obed Nkambadio =

French footballer (born 2003)

Personal information
- Full name: Obed Alpha Nkambadio
- Date of birth: 7 February 2003 (age 23)
- Place of birth: Paris, France
- Height: 1.90 m (6 ft 3 in)
- Position: Goalkeeper

Team information
- Current team: Paris FC
- Number: 16

Youth career
- 2011–2016: AF Épinay
- 2016–2018: AS Jeunesse Aubervilliers
- 2018–2019: Entente SSG
- 2019–2020: Paris FC

Senior career*
Years	Team	Apps	(Gls)
2020–2023	Paris FC II	39	(0)
2023–	Paris FC	76	(0)

International career^{‡}
2020	France U17	1	(0)
2022	France U20	1	(0)
2024–2025	France U21	3	(0)
2024	France Olympic	2	(0)
Medal record
Men's football
Representing France
Olympic Games
Silver medal – second place	2024
- * Club domestic league appearances and goals as of 19 April 2026 ‡ National team caps and goals as of 25 June 2025

Obed Alpha Nkambadio (born 7 February 2003) is a French professional footballer who plays as a goalkeeper for Ligue 1 club Paris FC.

== Club career ==
Nkambadio was born in Paris. He is a youth product of AF Épinay, AS Jeunesse Aubervilliers, and Entente SSG before moving to Paris FC in 2019. On 29 June 2020, he signed a 3-year youth contract with Paris FC and was promoted to their B-team. In July 2021, he signed a professional contract with the club until 2024. On 22 September 2023, he extended his contract with the club until 2026. He made his senior and professional debut with Paris FC in a 2–2 tie with Annecy on 30 September 2023.

== International career ==
Born in France, Nkambadio is of Congolese descent. He was called up to the France U17s in 2017. In October 2023, he was called up to the France U21s.

== Career statistics ==
As of match played 19 April 2026

Appearances and goals by club, season, and competition
Club	Season	League			National cup		Other		Total	
Club	Season	Division	Apps	Goals	Apps	Goals	Apps	Goals	Apps	Goals
Paris FC II	2020–21	National 3	2	0	—		—		2	0
Paris FC II	2021–22	National 3	18	0	—		—		18	0
Paris FC II	2022–23	National 3	19	0	—		—		19	0
Paris FC II	Total		39	0	—		—		39	0
Paris FC	2020–21	Ligue 2	0	0	0	0	—		0	0
Paris FC	2021–22	Ligue 2	0	0	0	0	0	0	0	0
Paris FC	2022–23	Ligue 2	0	0	0	0	—		0	0
Paris FC	2023–24	Ligue 2	30	0	0	0	1	0	31	0
Paris FC	2024–25	Ligue 2	34	0	0	0	—		34	0
Paris FC	2025–26	Ligue 1	12	0	3	0	—		15	0
Paris FC	Total		76	0	3	0	1	0	80	0
Career totals			115	0	3	0	1	0	119	0

== Honours ==
France U23

- Summer Olympics silver medal: 2024

Orders

- Knight of the National Order of Merit: 2024
