= Loup-Diwan Gueho =

French footballer (born 2004)

Personal information
- Date of birth: 24 May 2004 (age 22)
- Place of birth: Bourg-la-Reine, France
- Height: 1.88 m (6 ft 2 in)
- Position: Centre-back

Team information
- Current team: Cannes
- Number: 17

Youth career
- 2011–2012: FC Maisons-Alfort
- 2012–2013: CAP Charenton
- 2013–2014: Paris Saint-Germain
- 2014–2021: Paris FC

Senior career*
Years	Team	Apps	(Gls)
2021–2023	Paris FC II	29	(4)
2021–2023	Paris FC	12	(0)
2023–2026	Bastia	2	(0)
2023–2026	Bastia II	7	(1)
2024–2025	→ Lechia Gdańsk (loan)	22	(0)
2025–2026	→ Cannes (loan)	24	(0)
2026–	Cannes	0	(0)

International career
2021	France U17		
- * Club domestic league appearances and goals as of 16 May 2026

Loup-Diwan Gueho (born 24 May 2004) is a French professional footballer who plays as a centre-back for Ligue 3 club Cannes.

== Personal life ==
Gueho was born in Bourg-la-Reine to Anne-Marie and Jean-Pierre Gueho, who met while playing handball. His elder brother, Yann, also pursued a career in football, but retired before playing a professional match.

== Club career ==
Having come through the youth ranks of the Maisons-Alfort team, CAP Charenton and Paris Saint-Germain, he joined the Paris FC academy as a 10 years old. There he signed a youth contract in September 2021, tying him to the Parisian club until 2024.

Loup Diwan Gueho made his professional debut for Paris FC on 14 November 2021, replacing Florent Hanin, during a 2–2 away Coupe de France draw against CS Sedan.

He made his Ligue 2 debut on 1 February 2022, replacing Jaouen Hadjam during a 2–1 away win to AJ Auxerre.

On 8 February 2024, Gueho joined Polish second-tier club Lechia Gdańsk on loan until the end of the season, with an option to make the move permanent. His loan was extended for another season on 19 July 2024.

On 26 August 2025, Gueho was loaned to fourth-tier Cannes for the remainder of the season.

== International career ==
Loup Diwan Gueho is a youth international with France, having been called to the under-17 team in February 2021, playing a friendly game against US Orléans's U17, scoring a goal in a 7–0 win, as most junior competitions were canceled because of COVID.

== Honours ==
Lechia Gdańsk

- I liga: 2023–24
