= Morgan Guilavogui =

Footballer (born 1998)

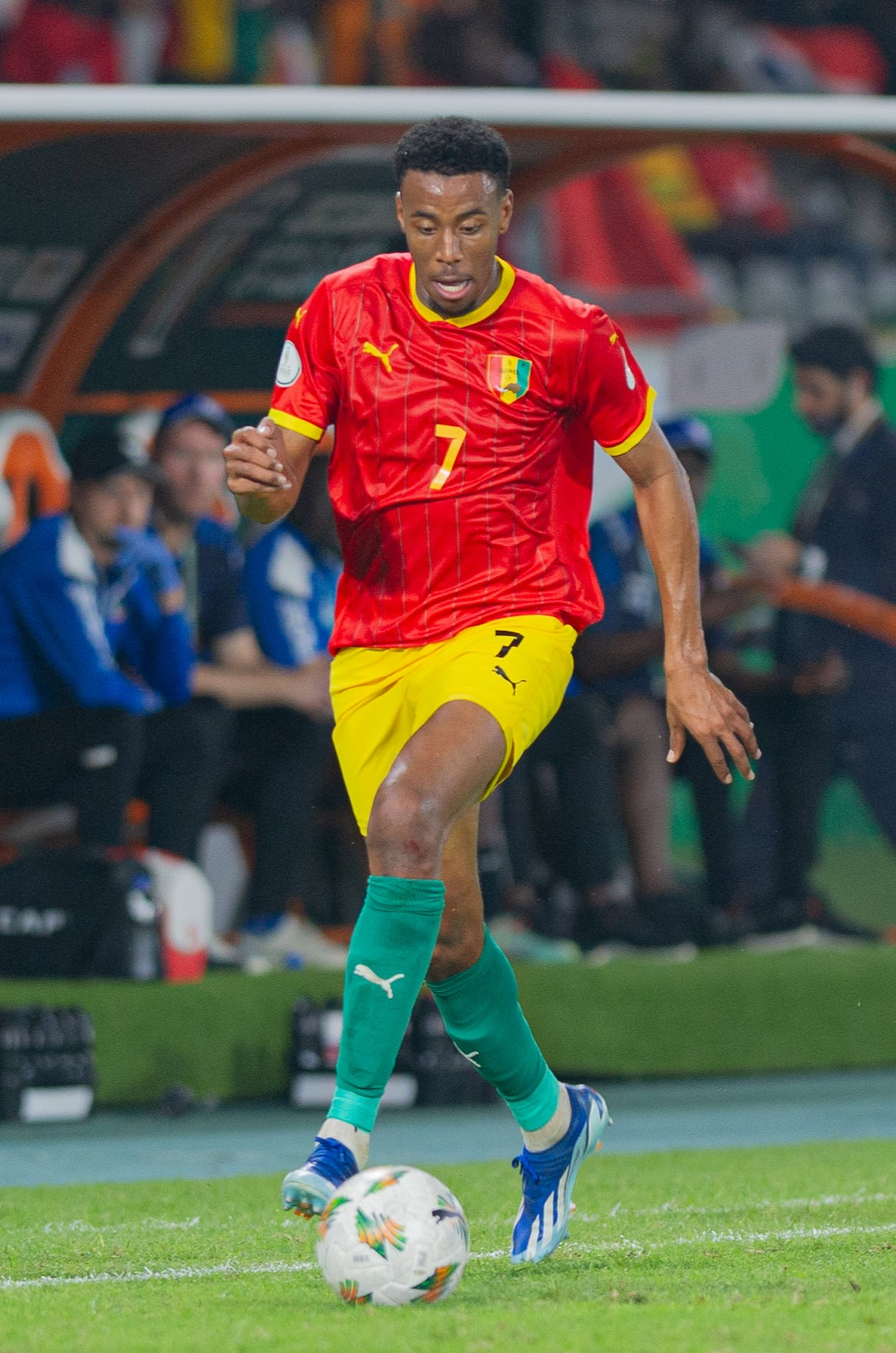
- Guilavogui in 2024 with Guinea

Personal information
- Full name: Morgan Bono Guilavogui
- Date of birth: 10 March 1998 (age 28)
- Place of birth: Toulon, France
- Height: 1.88 m (6 ft 2 in)
- Position: Forward

Team information
- Current team: Real Salt Lake
- Number: 9

Youth career
- 2013–2014: Saint-Étienne
- 2014–2016: Toulon

Senior career*
Years	Team	Apps	(Gls)
2016–2017	Toulon II	8	(5)
2017–2020	Toulon	54	(12)
2020–2023	Paris FC	82	(26)
2023–2026	Lens	39	(3)
2024–2025	→ FC St. Pauli (loan)	25	(6)
2026–	Real Salt Lake	17	(2)

International career^{‡}
2021–	Guinea	20	(2)
- * Club domestic league appearances and goals as of 5 September 2026 ‡ National team caps and goals as of 2 February 2024

Morgan Bono Guilavogui (born 10 March 1998) is a professional footballer who plays as a forward for Major League Soccer club Real Salt Lake. Born in France, he plays for the Guinea national team.

== Early life ==
Guilavogui was born in Ollioules, France, to a Guinean father and Moroccan mother.

== Club career ==
On 17 May 2020, Guilavogui signed a professional contract with Paris FC. He made his professional debut with the club in a 2–1 Ligue 2 win over Amiens on 12 September 2020. On 31 July 2021, Guilavogui scored his first league goal for the club in a 2–1 victory against Dunkerque.

On 29 June 2023, he joined RC Lens on a four-year contract.

On 26 July 2024, Guilavogui moved on loan to FC St. Pauli in Germany.

On 3 February 2026, Guilavogui signed a three-and-a-half-season contract with Real Salt Lake of the Major League Soccer.

== International career ==
Guilavogui holds French and Guinean nationalities. He made his debut for the Guinea national team in a 0–0 2022 FIFA World Cup qualification tie against Guinea Bissau on 12 November 2021.

== Personal life ==
Guilavogui is the younger brother of the French international footballer Josuha Guilavogui.

== Career statistics ==
=== Club ===
As of match played 11 January 2026

Appearances and goals by club, season and competition
Club	Season	League			National cup (Note: Includes Coupe de France, DFB Pokal)		Europe		Total	
Club	Season	Division	Apps	Goals	Apps	Goals	Apps	Goals	Apps	Goals
Toulon II	2016–17	National 3	8	5	—		—		8	5
Toulon	2017–18	National 2	11	1	0	0	—		11	1
Toulon	2018–19	National 2	26	9	1	0	—		27	9
Toulon	2019–20	National 2	17	2	0	0	—		17	2
Toulon	Total		54	12	1	0	—		55	12
Paris FC	2020–21	Ligue 2	18	0	0	0	—		18	0
Paris FC	2021–22	Ligue 2	32	11	1	3	—		33	14
Paris FC	2022–23	Ligue 2	32	15	4	3	—		36	18
Paris FC	Total		82	26	5	6	—		87	32
Lens	2023–24	Ligue 1	23	2	0	0	5 (Note: Four appearances in the UEFA Champions League, one appearance in UEFA Europa League)	0	28	2
Lens	2025–26	Ligue 1	15	1	2	0	—		17	1
Lens	Total		38	3	2	0	5	0	45	3
FC St. Pauli	2024–25	Bundesliga	25	6	2	1	—		27	7
Career total			207	52	10!7	5	0	222	59	

=== International ===
As of match played 2 February 2024

Appearances and goals by national team and year
National team	Year	Apps	Goals
Guinea	2021	2	0
Guinea	2022	5	0
Guinea	2023	8	2
Guinea	2024	6	0
Total		21	2

List of international goals scored by Morgan Guilavogui
No.	Date	Venue	Cap	Opponent	Score	Result	Competition	Ref.
1	27 March 2023	Prince Moulay Abdellah Stadium, Rabat, Morocco	9	Ethiopia	3–1	3–2	2023 Africa Cup of Nations qualification	
2	13 October 2023	Stade du 28 Septembre, Conakry, Guinea	11	Guinea-Bissau	1–0	1–0	Friendly	
