= Josias Lukembila =

Swiss footballer (born 1999)

Personal information
- Full name: Josias Tusevo Lukembila
- Date of birth: 9 September 1999 (age 27)
- Place of birth: Lausanne, Switzerland
- Height: 1.81 m (5 ft 11 in)
- Position: Winger

Team information
- Current team: Sion
- Number: 9

Youth career
- 2011–2015: Lausanne-Sport

Senior career*
Years	Team	Apps	(Gls)
2016–2020	Team Vaud U21	63	(13)
2020–2021	Lausanne-Sport	8	(1)
2021–2023	Wil	67	(18)
2023–2025	Paris FC	32	(3)
2024–2025	→ Winterthur (loan)	26	(3)
2025–	Sion	43	(7)

International career^{‡}
2019	Switzerland U20	6	(0)
- * Club domestic league appearances and goals as of 28 September 2026 ‡ National team caps and goals as of 18 November 2019

Josias Tusevo Lukembila (born 9 September 1999) is a Swiss professional footballer who plays as a winger for Swiss Super League club Sion.

== Club career ==
On 14 June 2019, Lukembila signed his first professional contract with Lausanne-Sport. He made his professional debut with the club in a 2–0 Swiss Super League win over Vaduz on 17 December 2020.

On 30 August 2021, he signed a two-year contract with Wil.

On 1 September 2023, Lukembila moved to Paris FC in French Ligue 2 on a three-year contract. On 31 August 2024, he returned to Switzerland and joined Winterthur on a season-long loan.

On 17 June 2025, Lukembila signed a four-year contract with Sion.

== International career ==
Born in Switzerland, Lukembila is of Congolese descent. He is a youth international for Switzerland.
