= María Cristina Kiehr =

María Cristina Kiehr (born in Tandil, Argentina) is a soprano vocalist associated with Baroque music. After receiving her early musical training in Argentina, she moved in 1983 to Europe and studied under René Jacobs at the Schola Cantorum Basiliensis, specializing in the Baroque repertoire. She performs and records for the Harmonia Mundi label.

== Overview ==
María Cristina Kiehr was born in Tandil, Argentina.

She made her opera debut at Innsbruck in 1988 in Il Giasone, a work composed by Francesco Cavalli in 1649. In collaboration with the harpsichordist Jean-Marc Aymes, Kiehr founded the Concerto Soave ensemble, a concerto in the original meaning of the word, which specializes in Italian music of the early baroque period. With them she has toured many of the world's most prestigious early music festivals, including the Utrecht Early Music Festival, Ambronay, Pontoise, Simiane-la-Rotonde, Semaine Sainte en Arles, and in Montreux, Lausanne, Marseille, and Paris (Cité de la Musique).

Her recording of Maddalena ai Piedi di Cristo with René Jacobs won a Grammy Award in 1997.

Her voice is especially suited to performing the work of neglected Italian female composers of the Early Baroque such as Barbara Strozzi and Francesca Caccini. Though she is known as a champion of little known works and composers, she is also sought after for her interpretations of Henry Purcell and Claudio Monteverdi.

== Critical reactions ==
Critical reactions to Kiehr's voice are often ecstatic:

- Richard Buell, Boston Globe, "Think of a glowing filament, only in sound; the beautiful thinness of Hesperion XX's lead singer Monserrat Figueras's voice, only larger and sweeter. Some singer."
- Craig Zeichner, CDNow.com, "To call Kiehr's voice angelic would not be indulging in hyperbole. She floats through a vocal line, caressing each phrase with marvelous agility."
