= Setigui Karamoko =

French footballer (born 1999)

Personal information
- Full name: Setigui Guillaume Karamoko
- Date of birth: 10 October 1999 (age 27)
- Place of birth: Paris, France
- Height: 1.90 m (6 ft 3 in)
- Position: Centre-back

Team information
- Current team: Sepsi OSK
- Number: 4

Youth career
- Solitaires Paris Est
- –2018: AAS Sarcelles
- 2018–2019: Le Puy Foot

Senior career*
Years	Team	Apps	(Gls)
2019–2020	Béziers b	13	(2)
2020	Béziers	2	(0)
2020–2021	Saint-Étienne B	5	(1)
2021–2023	Paris FC B	21	(0)
2022–2023	Paris FC	7	(0)
2023	Feirense	2	(0)
2023–2024	Avranches	0	(0)
2024	Bulle	8	(0)
2024–2025	Aubagne	31	(2)
2025–2026	Pau	17	(0)
2025–2026	Pau B	6	(0)
2026–	Sepsi OSK	14	(0)
- * Club domestic league appearances and goals as of 8 November 2026

Setigui Guillaume Karamoko (born 10 October 1999) is a French professional footballer who plays as a centre-back for Liga I club Sepsi OSK.

== Career ==
A youth product of Le Puy Foot, Karamoko began his senior career with Béziers in the Championnat National in 2020. He transferred to the reserves of Saint-Étienne on 28 May 2020. He moved to Paris FC in 2021 where was originally assigned to their reserves, before promoting to their senior team for the 2022-23 season.

On 31 January 2023, Karamoko signed with Feirense in Portugal.

On 26 July 2023, French third division side Avranches announced the signing of Karamoko on a two-year contract.

== Personal life ==
Born in France, Karamoko is of Ivorian descent and has dual nationality.

== Style of play ==
Karamoko is a left-footed centre-back characterized by a physical style of play. Standing 6ft 3in, he has also been used in roles requiring ball distribution. In the Championnat National, he recorded a goal following an 80m individual run.
