= Samir Chergui =

Algerian footballer (born 1999)

Personal information
- Full name: Samir Sophian Chergui
- Date of birth: 6 February 1999 (age 27)
- Place of birth: Arpajon, France
- Height: 1.85 m (6 ft 1 in)
- Position: Centre-back

Team information
- Current team: Paris FC
- Number: 31

Youth career
- 2006–2013: Brétigny
- 2013–2016: Auxerre

Senior career*
Years	Team	Apps	(Gls)
2016–2020	Auxerre B	44	(1)
2020–	Paris FC B	7	(0)
2020–	Paris FC	110	(2)

International career^{‡}
2025–	Algeria	7	(0)
- * Club domestic league appearances and goals as of 19 May 2026 ‡ National team caps and goals as of 25 September 2026

Samir Sophian Chergui (born 6 February 1999) is a professional footballer who plays as a centre-back for Ligue 1 club Paris FC. Born in France, he plays for the Algeria national team.

== Club career ==
Trained at CS Brétigny, the Brétignolais played as an attacking midfielder. Over the years, he gradually moved back down the pitch to play professionally as a central defender or right-back. His main qualities are athletic, but he is very gifted and comfortable technically. His former role as an attacking midfielder also gives him an excellent quality when throwing the ball, which allows him to project himself very quickly. A youth product of Auxerre since 2013, Chergui signed a professional contract with them on 20 June 2019. On 3 March 2020, he was released from Auxerre after repeated misconducts including arriving drunk at training the day after his 21st birthday.

A few months after, Chergui signed with Paris FC. Chergui made his professional debut with Paris FC in a 1–1 Ligue 2 tie with AC Ajaccio on 8 January 2021. He opened his professional goal account in May 2022 on the 37th matchday of Ligue 2 against Amiens. A headed goal at the start of the second half.

He received his first red card in November 2022 against Metz. He received a card for an excess of anger towards the referee of the match. For this, he received a 4-game suspension.

== International career ==
Born in France, Chergui is of Algerian descent. He was called up to the Algeria national team for a set of 2026 FIFA World Cup qualification matches in October 2025.

On 31 May 2026, Chergui was named in Vladimir Petković's 26-man Algeria squad for the 2026 FIFA World Cup.
