= Cyril Mandouki =

Footballer (born 1991)

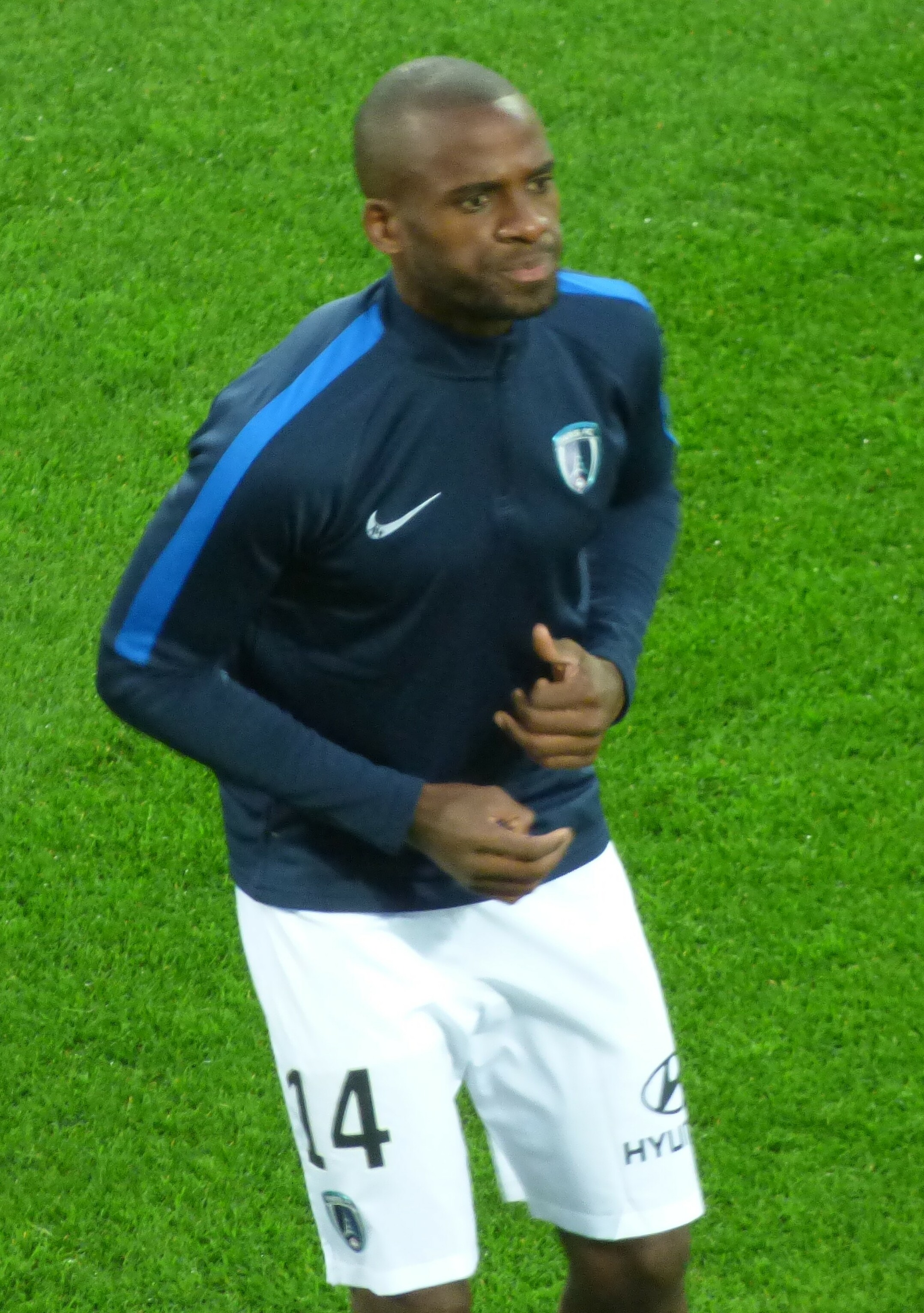
- Mandouki with Paris FC in 2018

Personal information
- Full name: Cyril Paul Mandouki
- Date of birth: 21 August 1991 (age 35)
- Place of birth: Paris, France
- Height: 1.79 m (5 ft 10 in)
- Position: Midfielder

Team information
- Current team: Laval
- Number: 14

Senior career*
Years	Team	Apps	(Gls)
2012–2013	Sainte-Geneviève	25	(8)
2013–2016	Dunkerque	83	(2)
2016–2017	Créteil	29	(2)
2017–2024	Paris FC	214	(6)
2024–2025	Gaziantep	16	(0)
2025–	Laval	33	(0)

International career^{‡}
2019–	Martinique	15	(1)
- * Club domestic league appearances and goals as of 12 May 2026 ‡ National team caps and goals as of 07:33, 5 June 2024 (UTC)

Cyril Paul Mandouki (born 21 August 1991) is a professional footballer who plays as a midfielder for Ligue 2 club Laval. Born in metropolitan France, he plays for the Martinique national team.

== Club career ==
Mandouki signed with Paris FC on 22 June 2017, after successful seasons in the lower divisions with Créteil and Dunkerque. He made his professional debut with Paris FC in a Ligue 2 0–0 tie with Clermont Foot on 28 August 2017.

== International career ==
Mandouki is of Martiniquais descent. In May 2019, he was named to the Martinique national team provisional team for the 2019 CONCACAF Gold Cup. He debuted for Martinique in a 1–1 2019–20 CONCACAF Nations League A tie with Trinidad and Tobago on 6 September 2019, scoring his side's only goal on his debut.

=== International goals ===
Scores and results list Martinique's goal tally first, score column indicates score after each Mandouki goal.

List of international goals scored by Cyril Mandouki
No.	Date	Venue	Opponent	Score	Result	Competition
1	6 September 2019	Stade Pierre-Aliker, Fort-de-France, Martinique	Trinidad and Tobago	1–0	1–1	2019–20 CONCACAF Nations League A
