= Jules Gaudin =

French footballer (born 2000)

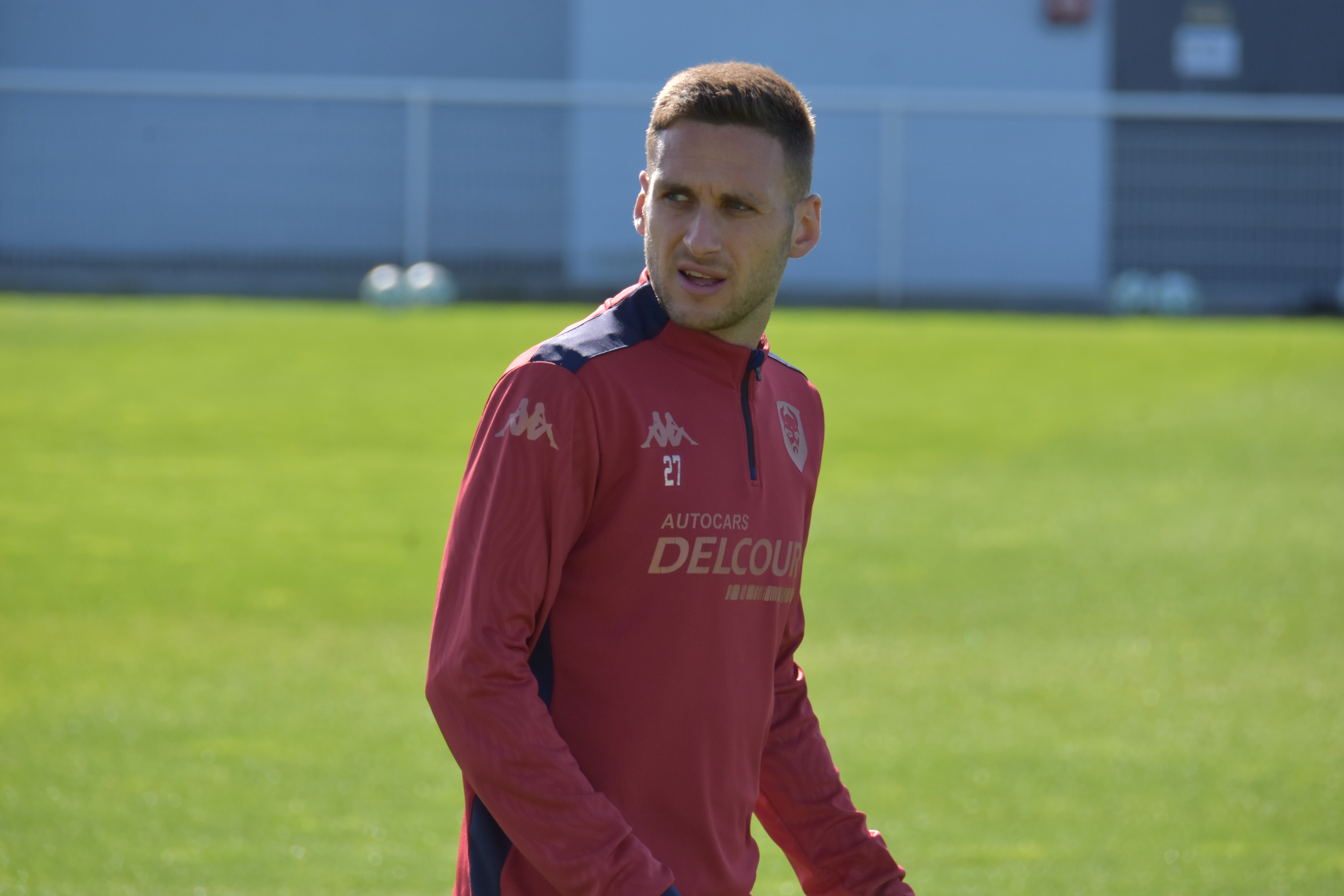
- Jules Gaudin in 2025

Personal information
- Date of birth: 9 May 2000 (age 26)
- Place of birth: Saint-Brieuc, France
- Height: 1.80 m (5 ft 11 in)
- Position: Midfielder

Team information
- Current team: Laval

Youth career
- 2006–2012: Hillion Saint-René
- 2012–2018: Guingamp

Senior career*
Years	Team	Apps	(Gls)
2018–2022	Guingamp B	23	(0)
2021–2023	Guingamp	30	(2)
2022	→ Bastia-Borgo (loan)	11	(0)
2023–2025	Paris FC	52	(1)
2025	→ Caen (loan)	11	(0)
2025–2026	Charleroi	19	(0)
2026–	Laval	0	(0)

International career
2015–2016	France U16	6	(1)
2016	France U17	1	(0)
- * Club domestic league appearances and goals as of 1 June 2026

Jules Gaudin (born 9 May 2000) is a French professional footballer who plays as a midfielder for Ligue 2 club Laval.

== Career ==
In the summer of 2020, Gaudin signed an aspirant contract with Guingamp. He made his professional debut with the club in a 3–0 win over Amiens on 1 May 2021.

On 4 December 2021, Gaudin was loaned to Bastia-Borgo in the Championnat National until the end of the 2021–22 season.

On 9 June 2023, Gaudin signed a three-year contract with Paris FC. On 2 February 2025, he moved on loan to Caen.

On 21 August 2025, Gaudin joined Charleroi in Belgium for two seasons.

On 16 June 2026, Gaudin moved to Laval in Ligue 2.

== International career ==
Gaudin is a youth international for France, having represented the France U16s and France U17s.
