= Maxime Bernauer =

French footballer (born 1998)

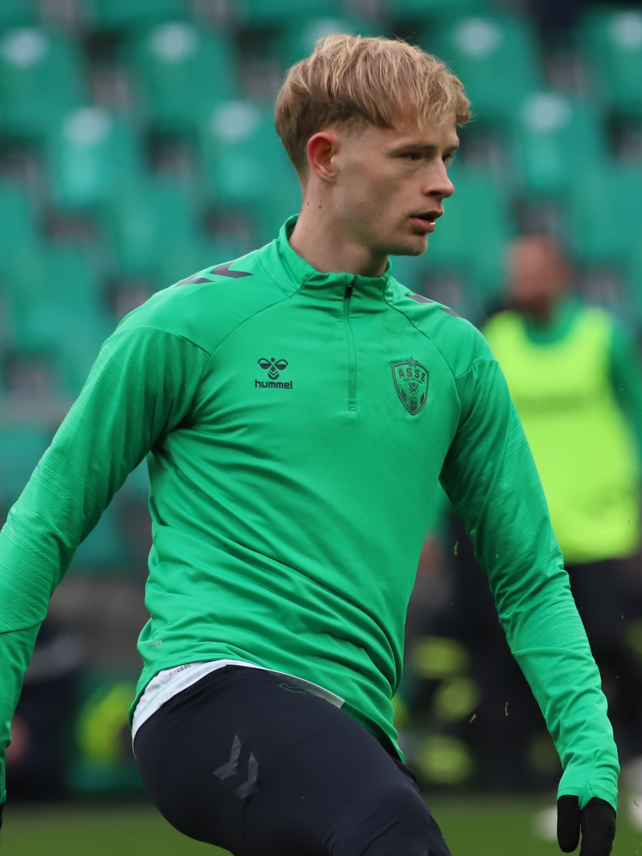
- Bernauer with Saint-Étienne in 2025

Personal information
- Date of birth: 1 July 1998 (age 28)
- Place of birth: Hennebont, France
- Height: 1.86 m (6 ft 1 in)
- Positions: Defensive midfielder; full-back

Team information
- Current team: Saint-Étienne
- Number: 6

Youth career
- 2004–2006: GV Hennebont
- 2006–2009: Lorient
- 2009–2013: Montagnarde
- 2013–2017: Rennes

Senior career*
Years	Team	Apps	(Gls)
2017–2019	Rennes II	42	(1)
2019–2020	Concarneau	25	(0)
2020–2021	Le Mans	32	(0)
2021–2023	Paris FC	66	(2)
2023–2025	Dinamo Zagreb	26	(1)
2025	→ Saint-Étienne (loan)	11	(0)
2025–	Saint-Étienne	25	(1)

International career
2013–2014	France U16	13	(0)
2014	France U17	4	(0)
- * Club domestic league appearances and goals as of 13:37, 9 November 2026 (UTC)

Maxime Bernauer (born 1 July 1998) is a French professional footballer who plays as a defensive midfielder or full-back for Ligue 2 club Saint-Étienne.

== Club career ==
A youth product of Hennebont, Lorient, Montagnarde, and Rennes, Bernauer began his senior career with the reserves of Rennes. He started his career as a centre-back, but proved a utility player capable of playing right-back and as defensive midfielder. After Rennes, he played in the Championnat National with Concarneau and Le Mans. On 13 July 2021, he transferred to Paris FC until June 2024. He made his professional debut with Paris FC in a 4–0 league win over Grenoble on 24 July 2021.

On 2 February 2025, Bernauer joined Saint-Étienne on loan with an option to buy. The club exercised that option for €1.2 million on 10 June 2025.

== International career ==
Bernauer is a youth international for France, having represented the France U16s and U17s.

== Career statistics ==
As of match played 2 December 2025

Appearances and goals by club, season and competition
Club	Season	League			Cup		Continental		Other		Total	
Club	Season	Division	Apps	Goals	Apps	Goals	Apps	Goals	Apps	Goals	Apps	Goals
Concarneau	2014–15	Championnat National	25	0	2	0	—		—		27	0
Le Mans	2020–21	Championnat National	32	0	0	0	—		—		32	0
Paris FC	2021–22	Ligue 2	31	1	2	0	—		—		33	1
Paris FC	2022–23	Ligue 2	35	1	3	0	—		—		38	1
Paris FC	Total		66	2	5	0	—		—		71	2
Dinamo Zagreb	2023–24	Prva HNL	17	1	3	1	6	0	—		26	2
Dinamo Zagreb	2024–25	Prva HNL	9	0	0	0	8	0	—		17	0
Dinamo Zagreb	Total		26	1	3	1	14	0	0	0	43	2
Career total			149	4	10	1	14	0	0	0	173	4

== Honours ==
Dinamo Zagreb

- Croatian Super Cup: 2023
