= Jérémy Aymes =

French footballer (born 1988)

Personal information
- Date of birth: 12 July 1988 (age 38)
- Place of birth: Martigues, France
- Height: 1.89 m (6 ft 2 in)
- Position: Goalkeeper

Senior career*
Years	Team	Apps	(Gls)
2006–2008	Lyon B		
2008–2009	Jura Sud		
2009–2011	Istres	0	(0)
2011–2014	Port-de-Bouc		
2014–2018	Granville	95	(0)
2019–2021	Le Mans B	2	(0)
2018–2021	Le Mans	33	(0)
2021-2024	Martigues	101	(0)
2024–2026	Cannes	38	(0)
- * Club domestic league appearances and goals

Jérémy Aymes (born 12 July 1988) is a French former professional footballer who played as a goalkeeper.

== Career ==
Aymes previously played for football club Istres.

In May 2021, Aymes signed with his hometown club Martigues in the Championnat National 2.

In November 2024, six months after being promoted to Ligue 2 with Martigues, he joins AS Cannes in the Championnat National 2.

== Honours ==
Martigues

- Championnat National 2: 2021–22
