= Gabriel Oualengbe =

Central African footballer (born 2004)

Personal information
- Full name: Yaloungou Prince Gabriel Oualengbe Bisse
- Date of birth: 21 May 2004 (age 22)
- Place of birth: Paris 13e, France
- Height: 1.88 m (6 ft 2 in)
- Position: Midfielder

Team information
- Current team: Toulon (on loan from Paris FC)
- Number: 18

Youth career
- –2017: Paris Université Club
- 2017–2021: Paris 13 Atletico
- 2021–2022: Paris FC

Senior career*
Years	Team	Apps	(Gls)
2021–	Paris FC B	13	(3)
2022–	Paris FC	1	(0)
2024	→ Créteil (loan)	4	(0)
2025–	→ Toulon (loan)	20	(4)

International career^{‡}
2025–	Central African Republic	1	(0)
- * Club domestic league appearances and goals as of 17 January 2026 ‡ National team caps and goals as of 19 March 2025

Yaloungou Prince Gabriel Oualengbe Bisse (born 21 May 2004) is a professional footballer who plays for Championnat National 1 club Toulon on loan from Paris FC. Born in France, he plays for the Central African Republic national team.

== Early life ==
Oualengbe grew up in Gentilly, Val-de-Marne. Oualengbe first played for the Paris Université Club, before joining in 2017 the FC Gobelins, an amateur club in the southern 13th arrondissement of Paris. There he stood out in the youth teams, allowing him to be selected for the Madewis Cup 2019, a youth tournament in Lyon, where he reached the final and was named player of the tournament.

== Club career ==
Having become the captain of the under-17 team of FC Gobelins by the 2019–20 season, Oualengbe joined the Paris FC academy in 2021. He soon started playing with the reserve Parisian team in National 2, becoming a key player of the team by the beginning of the 2022–23 Season.

Oualengbe made his professional debut for Paris FC on the 29 October 2022, starting and playing every minute of a 3–1 away Coupe de France win to Les Ulis.

On 31 January 2024, Oualengbe was loaned by Créteil in the fourth-tier Championnat National 2. On 14 January 2025, he joined Toulon on loan in the National 2.

== International career ==
Oualengbe made his debut for the Central African Republic national team on 19 March 2025 in a World Cup qualifier against Madagascar.

== Personal life ==
Born in France, Oualengbe is of Central African Republic descent and has dual nationality.

== Style of play ==
Oualengbe has been described as a powerful midfielder, able to deliver long passes with great precision, earning early comparisons to fellow Parisian Paul Pogba.
