= Jean-Marc Aymes =

French harpsichordist

Jean-Marc Aymes (born 1961) is a French harpsichordist, organist and pedagogue. He was appointed professor of harpsichord at the CNSMDL in 2009, after two years as director of the Regional Centre for Baroque Art in Marseille.

== Biography ==
He began his harpsichord and organ studies in Toulouse, seduced since his youth by Baroque and Renaissance music, but also by the contemporary repertoire. Continuing his studies brought him from Brussels to The Hague. The harpsichord occupied most of his professional time, until 2009 mainly for the interpretative aspect of this art, pedagogy only came to him when he was appointed to the CNSMD in Lyon.

Until then, he had only worked as a harpsichordist in numerous concerts around the world and in the most famous early music festivals.

He spent a large part of his life in the Toulouse region, before coming to southeastern France for his professional activities in Lyon and Marseille, where he currently resides.

== Career ==
Jean-Marc Aymes is regularly called upon to perform alongside early music ensembles: Akadémia, Daedalus, Ensemble Clément Janequin, Les Talens Lyriques.

He founded the "Concerto Soave" in the company of the Argentinean soprano María Cristina Kiehr. This Phocaean phalanx is specialized in the 17th century Italian repertoire and sees them perform all year round in the Marseille region. Moreover, it is in this city that what is meant to be a "showcase of soloists embedding the (voice) of the soprano" that the musicians who constitute it settle down.

The opening of Jean-Marc Aymes to contemporary music, a relative rarity among great performers of early music, is reflected in his active participation in the contemporary life of composers, notably through the acceptance of dedications and the creation of several solo works for harpsichord, but also through collaborations with the ensemble Musicatreize directed by Roland Hayrabédian.

The musicological approach of Jean-Marc Aymes, common to many musicians specialized in the baroque repertoire, is reflected in a close collaboration with researchers, notably Dinko Fabris, author of the notice of his recording of the 4th volume of Girolamo Frescobaldi's works.

== Discography ==
- Fin de siècle à Venise - harpsichord music at the end of the 16th century - éd. L’Empreinte digitale
- Girolamo Frescobaldi:Accenni : Suonate d'intavolatura. Libro Primo - Music for keyboard kept in manuscript - L’Empreinte digitale
- Girolamo Frescobaldi: complete music for keyboard music in IV volumes - Disques Ligia Digital - distribution Harmonia Mundi

I Toccate d'intavolatura, Libro Primo

II Il Primo Libro di Capricci

III Il Secondo Libro di Toccate | Canzoni alla Francese (1615)

IV Fantasie (1608) | Recercari e Canzoni Franzese (1615) | Fiori Musicali (1635)
