= Yoan Koré =

French footballer (born 2004)

Personal information
- Full name: Yoan Wakis Koré
- Date of birth: 16 November 2004 (age 21)
- Place of birth: Bourg-la-Reine, France
- Height: 1.87 m (6 ft 2 in)
- Position: Centre-back

Team information
- Current team: Paris FC
- Number: 25

Youth career
- 2011–2014: CO Cachan
- 2014–2021: Paris FC

Senior career*
Years	Team	Apps	(Gls)
2021–2023	Paris FC B	20	(2)
2021–	Paris FC	43	(3)
2025	→ Clermont (loan)	10	(0)
2025–2026	→ Betis Deportivo (loan)	11	(1)
2026	→ Amiens (loan)	8	(2)

International career^{‡}
2021–2022	France U18	8	(2)
2022–2023	France U19	6	(1)
2023–2024	France U20	5	(0)
- * Club domestic league appearances and goals as of 12 May 2026 ‡ National team caps and goals as of 25 March 2024

Yoan Wakis Koré (born 16 November 2004) is a French professional footballer who plays as a centre-back for Ligue 1 club Paris FC. Born in France, Koré is of Ivorian descent.

== Club career ==
Koré is a youth product of CO Cachan and Paris FC. On 12 December 2020, he signed his first academy contract with Paris FC until June 2024. He made his professional debut with Paris FC in a 2–0 Ligue 2 win over Nîmes on 21 September 2021. On 11 August 2022, he signed a professional contract with the club until 2025. On 3 February 2025, Koré moved on loan to Clermont. On 1 September 2025, he was loaned by Betis Deportivo in Spain, the reserve team of Real Betis. On 2 February 2026, Koré moved on a new loan to Amiens in Ligue 2, with an option to buy.

== International career ==
He is a youth international for France, having played up to the France U19s.
