= 2022–23 AS Saint-Étienne season =

AS Saint-Étienne
2022–23 season
- President: Bernard Caïazzo (Supervisory Board)
- Head coach: Laurent Batlles
- Stadium: Stade Geoffroy-Guichard
- Ligue 2: 8th
- Coupe de France: Seventh round
- Top goalscorer: League: Jean-Philippe Krasso (17); All: Jean-Philippe Krasso (17)
Home colours	Away colours

The 2022–23 season was the 104th in the history of AS Saint-Étienne and their first season back in the second division since 2004. The club participated in the Ligue 2 and the Coupe de France.

== Players ==
=== Squad ===
As of 23 April 2023.

Note: Flags indicate national team as defined under FIFA eligibility rules; some limited exceptions apply. Players may hold more than one non-FIFA nationality.

No.	Pos.	Nation	Player
1	GK	FRA	Matthieu Dreyer
3	DF	FRA	Mickaël Nadé
4	DF	GUI	Saïdou Sow
5	DF	FRA	Jimmy Giraudon
6	MF	MAR	Benjamin Bouchouari
7	MF	FRA	Thomas Monconduit
8	DF	FRA	Dennis Appiah
10	FW	FRA	Gaëtan Charbonnier
11	MF	FRA	Kader Bamba (on loan from Nantes)
14	MF	FRA	Dylan Chambost
15	FW	FRA	Lenny Pintor
16	GK	SEN	Boubacar Fall
17	FW	CIV	Jean-Philippe Krasso
18	MF	FRA	Mathieu Cafaro (on loan from Standard)

No.	Pos.	Nation	Player
19	DF	FRA	Léo Pétrot
21	DF	CRO	Mateo Pavlović (on loan from Rijeka)
22	MF	FRA	Victor Lobry
23	DF	FRA	Anthony Briançon
25	FW	SEN	Ibrahima Wadji
26	MF	FRA	Lamine Fomba
27	DF	FRA	Niels Nkounkou (on loan from Everton)
29	MF	FRA	Aïmen Moueffek
30	GK	FRA	Gautier Larsonneur
34	MF	FRA	Antoine Gauthier
37	MF	FRA	Louis Mouton
39	FW	FRA	Ayman Aiki
42	GK	ENG	Etienne Green

=== Out on loan ===
Note: Flags indicate national team as defined under FIFA eligibility rules; some limited exceptions apply. Players may hold more than one non-FIFA nationality.

No.	Pos.	Nation	Player
—	DF	CIV	Abdoulaye Bakayoko (at Le Puy until 30 June 2023)
—	DF	FRA	Yvann Maçon (at Paris FC until 30 June 2023)
—	MF	FRA	Mahdi Camara (at Brest until 30 June 2023)

No.	Pos.	Nation	Player
—	MF	CMR	Yvan Neyou (at Leganés until 30 June 2023)
—	MF	FRA	Maxence Rivera (at Le Puy until 30 June 2023)

=== Other players under contract ===
Note: Flags indicate national team as defined under FIFA eligibility rules; some limited exceptions apply. Players may hold more than one non-FIFA nationality.

No.	Pos.	Nation	Player
50	GK	FRA	Noah Raveyre
52	DF	FRA	Anas Namri
—	DF	FRA	Lucas Calodat
—	DF	CMR	Bryan Nokoue
—	MF	GBS	Edmilson Correia

No.	Pos.	Nation	Player
—	MF	SEN	El Hadji Dieye
—	MF	FRA	Baptiste Gabard
—	MF	FRA	Mathys Saban
—	FW	FRA	Yanis Lhéry

== Transfers ==
=== In ===
No.	Pos.	Player	Transferred from	Fee	Date	Source
5	DF	(France) Jimmy Giraudon	(France) Troyes	Free	1 July 2022	
14	MF	(France) Dylan Chambost	(France) Troyes	Free	1 July 2022	
23	DF	(France) Anthony Briançon	(France) Nîmes	Free	1 July 2022	
18	MF	(France) Mathieu Cafaro	(Belgium) Standard Liège	Loan (Note: Includes an option to sign permanently.)	20 July 2022	
22	MF	(France) Victor Lobry	Unattached	Free	20 July 2022	
15	FW	(France) Lenny Pintor	(France) Lyon	Free	4 August 2022	
6	MF	(Morocco) Benjamin Bouchouari	(Netherlands) Roda JC	€1 million	16 August 2022	
1	GK	(France) Matthieu Dreyer	(France) Lorient	Free	23 August 2022	
7	MF	(France) Thomas Monconduit	(France) Lorient	€500,000 (Note: Saint-Étienne paid €1 million for the transfers of both Monconduit and Pétrot from Lorient.)	30 August 2022	
19	DF	(France) Léo Pétrot	(France) Lorient	€500,000	30 August 2022	
25	FW	(Senegal) Ibrahima Wadji	(Azerbaijan) Qarabağ	€1 million	30 August 2022	
10	FW	(France) Gaëtan Charbonnier	(France) Auxerre	€1 million (Note: Bonuses included.)	16 December 2022	
8	DF	(France) Dennis Appiah	(France) Nantes	Undisclosed	3 January 2023	
30	GK	(France) Gautier Larsonneur	(France) Brest	€1.6 million	6 January 2023	
20	MF	(France) Kader Bamba	(France) Nantes	Loan	14 January 2023	
27	DF	(France) Niels Nkounkou	(England) Everton	Loan	14 January 2023	
26	DF	(France) Lamine Fomba	(France) Nîmes	€500,000	28 January 2023	
21	DF	(Croatia) Mateo Pavlović	(Croatia) HNK Rijeka	Loan	31 January 2023	

=== Out ===
Pos.	Player	Transferred to	Fee	Date	Source
DF	(France) Joris Gnagnon	Released (Note: Gnagnon and Saint-Étienne reached a mutual agreement to end his contract.)	Free	7 May 2022	
GK	(France) Paul Bernardoni	(France) Angers	Loan return	1 July 2022	
DF	(Mali) Falaye Sacko	(Portugal) Vitória de Guimarães	Loan return	1 July 2022	
FW	(France) Enzo Crivelli	(Turkey) İstanbul Başakşehir	Loan return	1 July 2022	
FW	(Senegal) Sada Thioub	(France) Angers	Loan return	1 July 2022	
MF	(France) Romain Hamouma	(France) Ajaccio	Free	1 July 2022	
FW	(Tunisia) Wahbi Khazri	(France) Montpellier	Free	1 July 2022	
FW	(France) Arnaud Nordin	(France) Montpellier	Free	1 July 2022	
DF	(France) Timothée Kolodziejczak	Released	Free	1 July 2022	
DF	(France) Eliaquim Mangala	Released	Free	1 July 2022	
MF	(France) Bilal Benkhedim	Released	Free	1 July 2022	
MF	(Mali) Bakary Sako	Released	Free	1 July 2022	
MF	(Algeria) Ryad Boudebouz	Released (Note: On 8 September 2022, Boudebouz joined Al Ahli.)	Free	1 July 2022	
MF	(Senegal) Assane Dioussé	Released (Note: On 13 July 2022, Dioussé joined OFI.)	Free	1 July 2022	
DF	(Peru) Miguel Trauco	Released (Note: On 3 September 2022, Trauco joined the San Jose Earthquakes.)	Free	1 July 2022	
FW	(France) Lamine Ghezali	Released (Note: On 17 August 2022, Ghezali joined Dinamo București.)	Free	1 July 2022	
MF	(France) Lucas Gourna-Douath	(Austria) Red Bull Salzburg	€15 million	13 July 2022	
MF	(France) Zaydou Youssouf	(Portugal) Famalicão	€1 million	4 August 2022	
MF	(Gabon) Denis Bouanga	(United States) Los Angeles FC	€5 million	5 August 2022	
DF	(Cameroon) Harold Moukoudi	(Greece) AEK Athens	Free	18 August 2022	
MF	(France) Mahdi Camara	(France) Brest	Loan (Note: Includes an option to sign permanently for €3.5 million.)	26 August 2022	
MF	(Cameroon) Yvan Neyou	(Spain) Leganés	Loan	31 August 2022	
MF	(France) Maxence Rivera	(France) Le Puy	Loan	31 August 2022	
MF	(France) Adil Aouchiche	(France) Lorient	Undisclosed	1 September 2022	
DF	(France) Yvann Maçon	(France) Paris FC	Loan	8 December 2022	
DF	(Ivory Coast) Abdoulaye Bakayoko	(France) Le Puy	Loan	28 January 2023	
DF	(Brazil) Gabriel Silva	Released (Note: Silva and Saint-Étienne reached a mutual agreement to end his contract.)	Free	27 January 2023	
DF	(Spain) Sergi Palencia	Released (Note: Palencia and Saint-Étienne reached a mutual agreement to end his contract.)	Free	30 January 2023	
FW	(France) Charles Abi	(Switzerland) Stade Lausanne Ouchy	Free	6 February 2023	

== Pre-season and friendlies ==
Win Draw Loss

9 July 2022 Friendly	Saint-Étienne	3–0	Thonon Évian	L'Étrat
18:00 CEST (UTC+2)	Aiki 48'; Krasso 63'; Maçon 71'	Report		Stadium: Stade Aimé Jacquet

12 July 2022 Friendly	Le Puy Foot	0–1	Saint-Étienne	Espaly-Saint-Marcel
19:00 CEST (UTC+2)		Report	Gauthier 19'	Stadium: Stade Charles Massot

15 July 2022 Friendly	Grenoble	1–1	Saint-Étienne	Le Chambon-sur-Lignon
18:00 CEST (UTC+2)	Tell 55'	Report	Krasso 44'	Stadium: Stade Municipal

20 July 2022 Friendly	Saint-Étienne	1–1	Bordeaux	Vichy
19:00 CEST (UTC+2)	Bouanga 90+1' (pen.)	Report	Delaurier-Chaubet 24'	Stadium: Stade Louis-Darragon

23 July 2022 Friendly	Angers	4–1	Saint-Étienne	Saumur
17:00 CEST (UTC+2)	Sima 10'; Diony (penalty missed) 76', 84'; Bobichon 90', 90+4'	Report	Briançon 28'	Stadium: Stade des Rives du Thouet

9 December 2022 Friendly	Saint-Étienne	3–1	Grenoble	L'Étrat
17:00 CET (UTC+1)	Saban 26'; Krasso 75' (pen.); Ghoulam 83'		Correa 31'	Stadium: Stade Aimé Jacquet

== Competitions ==
=== Overall record ===
Competition	First match	Last match	Starting round	Final position	Record							
Competition	First match	Last match	Starting round	Final position	Pld	W	D	L	GF	GA	GD	Win %
Ligue 2	30 July 2022	2 June 2023	Matchday 1	8th	38	15	11	12	63	57	+6	39.47
Coupe de France	29 October 2022		Seventh round	Seventh round	1	0	1	0	0	0	+0	0.00
Total					39	15	12	12	63	57	+6	38.46

Source: Soccerway

=== Ligue 2 ===
==== League table ====
Pos	Team	Pld	W	D	L	GF	GA	GD	Pts	Promotion or Relegation
6	Guingamp	38	15	10	13	51	46	+5	55	
7	Paris FC	38	15	10	13	45	43	+2	55	
8	Saint-Étienne	38	15	11	12	63	57	+6	53 (Note: Saint-Étienne were deducted three points for a pitch invasion during their relegation play-off the previous season.)	
9	Sochaux (D, R)	38	15	7	16	54	41	+13	52	Relegation to Championnat National
10	Grenoble	38	14	9	15	33	36	−3	51	

Source: Ligue 2
Rules for classification: 1) Points; 2) Goal difference; 3) Number of goals scored; 4) Head-to-head goal difference; 5) Fair play points
(D) Disqualified; (R) Relegated

==== Results summary ====
Overall								Home						Away					
Pld	W	D	L	GF	GA	GD	Pts	W	D	L	GF	GA	GD	W	D	L	GF	GA	GD
38	15	11	12	63	57	+6	56	10	4	5	34	27	+7	5	7	7	29	30	−1

Source: Ligue 2

==== Results by round ====
Round	1	2	3	4	5	6	7	8	9	10	11	12	13	14	15	16	17	18	19	20	21	22
Ground	A	H	A	H	A	H	A	H	A	H	A	H	A	A	H	A	H	H	A	H	A	H
Result	L	D	D	L	D	W	D	W	L	D	L	L	W	L	L	L	D	W	W	L	L	
Position	20	20	20	20	20	19	19	15	18	18	18	19	18	19	20	20	20	20	18	19	19	

Source: Ligue 2
A = Away; H = Home; W = Win; D = Draw; L = Loss

==== Matches ====
The league fixtures were announced on 17 June 2022.

30 July 2022 1	Dijon	2–1	Saint-Étienne	Dijon
15:00 CEST (UTC+2)	Le Bihan 29'; Soumaré 41'	Report	Aiki 69'	Stadium: Stade Gaston Gérard; Attendance: 11,465; Referee: Romain Lissorgue

6 August 2022 2	Saint-Étienne	1–1	Nîmes	Saint-Étienne
15:00 CEST (UTC+2)	Krasso 45' (pen.)	Report	Thomasen 32'	Stadium: Stade Geoffroy-Guichard; Referee: Mathieu Vernice

15 August 2022 3	Quevilly-Rouen	2–2	Saint-Étienne	Le Petit-Quevilly
20:45 CEST (UTC+2)	Boé-Kane 13'; Gbelle 32'	Report	Krasso 37'; Cafaro 45'	Stadium: Stade Robert Diochon; Attendance: 7,500; Referee: Alexandre Perreau Niel

20 August 2022 4	Saint-Étienne	0–6	Le Havre	Saint-Étienne
15:00 CEST (UTC+2)		Report	Sangante 51'; Alioui 56'; Lekhal 64'; Operi 80', 84'; Kitala 89'	Stadium: Stade Geoffroy-Guichard; Referee: François Letexier

27 August 2022 5	Valenciennes	2–2	Saint-Étienne	Valenciennes
19:00 CEST (UTC+2)	Zinga 26'; Cuffaut 90+4' (pen.)	Report	Maçon 30'; Krasso 48'	Stadium: Stade du Hainaut; Attendance: 8,210; Referee: Guillaume Paradis

30 August 2022 6	Saint-Étienne	5–0	Bastia	Saint-Étienne
20:45 CEST (UTC+2)	Maçon 8'; Krasso 19', 33', 36', 62'	Report		Stadium: Stade Geoffroy-Guichard; Referee: Mikael Lesage

5 September 2022 7	Pau	2–2	Saint-Étienne	Pau
20:45 CEST (UTC+2)	D'Almeida (yellow card) 36'; Saivet 68', 79'; Kouassi (yellow card) 83'	Report	Bakayoko (yellow card) 21'; Bouchouari (yellow card) 27'; Mouton 34'; Green (red card) 63'; Maçon (yellow card) 70'; Sergi Palencia (yellow card) 77'; Pintor 85' (pen.), (yellow card) 90+1'	Stadium: Nouste Camp; Attendance: 3,779; Referee: (France) Pierre Legat

10 September 2022 8	Saint-Étienne	2–0	Bordeaux	Saint-Étienne
15:00 CEST (UTC+2)	Pétrot (yellow card) 17'; Giraudon (yellow card) 30'; Wadji 35'; Maçon 67'; Cafaro (yellow card) 74'	Report	Barbet (yellow card) 26'; Lacoux (yellow card) 44'	Stadium: Stade Geoffroy-Guichard; Referee: (France) Romain Lissorgue

17 September 2022 9	Guingamp	2–1	Saint-Étienne	Guingamp
15:00 CEST (UTC+2)	Livolant (yellow card) 40', (goal) 59'; Courtet 45+2', (yellow card) 61'	Report	Briançon (yellow card) 11'; Giraudon (yellow card) 54'; Wadji (yellow card) 65'; Lobry 81'	Stadium: Stade de Roudourou; Attendance: 11,645; Referee: (France) Benjamin Lepaysant

1 October 2022 10	Saint-Étienne	2–2	Grenoble	Saint-Étienne
15:00 CET (UTC+1)	Monconduit (yellow card) 34'; Chambost 58'; Krasso (yellow card) 60'; Briançon 65'	Report	Tell 2' (yellow card) 38'; Touray (yellow card) 32'; Phaëton 78'	Stadium: Stade Geoffroy-Guichard; Attendance: 22,959; Referee: (France) Gaël Angoula

10 October 2022 11	Sochaux	2–1	Saint-Étienne	Montbéliard
20:45 CET (UTC+1)	Agouzoul 3'; Weissbeck (yellow card) 40'; Doumbia (yellow card) 45+1' (goal) 48'; Aaneba (yellow card) 56'; Faussurier (yellow card) 68'	Report	Sergi Palencia (yellow card) 19'; Giraudon (yellow card) 36'; Krasso 69' (pen.) (red card) 90+4'	Stadium: Stade Auguste Bonal; Attendance: 19,205; Referee: (France) Guillaume Paradis

15 October 2022 12	Saint-Étienne	0–2	Paris FC	Saint-Étienne
15:00 CET (UTC+1)	Bouchouari (yellow card) 31'; Chambost (yellow card) 36'	Report	Mandouki (yellow card) 36'; Le Cardinal 60'; Filipović (yellow card) 66' (yellow-red card) 76'; Chahiri 82'; Phiri (yellow card) 89'	Stadium: Stade Geoffroy-Guichard; Attendance: 18,412; Referee: (France) Alexandre Perreau-Niel

22 October 2022 13	Amiens SC	0–1	Saint-Étienne	Amiens
15:00 CET (UTC+1)	Ring (yellow card) 61'; Fofana (yellow card) 74'	Report	Wadji (yellow card) 35' (goal) 50' (pen.); Pétrot (yellow card) 39'	Stadium: Stade de la Licorne; Attendance: 11,101; Referee: (France) Mikael Lesage

7 November 2022 14	Metz	3–2	Saint-Étienne	Longeville-lès-Metz
20:45 CET (UTC+1)	Krasso 18' (o.g.); N'Doram 39'; Udol 60'; Kouyaté (yellow card) 90+2'	Report	Maçon (yellow card) 20'; Wadji 24'; Giraudon (yellow card) 67'; Nadé 90+4'	Stadium: Stade Saint-Symphorien; Attendance: 16,881; Referee: (France) Olivier Thual

12 November 2022 15	Saint-Étienne	0–2	Rodez	Saint-Étienne
15:00 CET (UTC+1)	Nadé (yellow card) 24'; Krasso (yellow card) 38'; Cafaro (yellow card) 57'; Giraudon (yellow card) 68' (red card) 68'	Report	Danger (yellow card) 20'; Chougrani (yellow card) 26'; Depres (yellow card) 44'; Senaya 54'; Anas Namri 60' (o.g.)	Stadium: Stade Geoffroy-Guichard; Attendance: 19,743; Referee: (France) Pierre Legat

26 December 2022 16	Annecy	2–1	Saint-Étienne	Annecy
17:00 CET (UTC+1)	Sahi 2', 51'; Bastian (yellow card) 53'; Demoncy (yellow card) 70'; Billemaz (yellow card) 88'	Report	Pintor (yellow card) 8'; Pétrot 76'; Briançon (yellow card) 85'; Sow (yellow card) 90+2'	Stadium: Parc des Sports; Attendance: 12,000; Referee: Faouzi Benchabane

30 December 2022 17	Saint-Étienne	1–1	Caen	Saint-Étienne
19:00 CET (UTC+1)	Bakayoko (yellow card) 15'; Nadé (yellow card) 39'; Charbonnier (yellow card) 73', (goal) 90+2'; Bouchouari (yellow card) 79'	Report	Mendy (penalty scored) 17', (yellow card) 45+1'; Kyeremeh (yellow card) 43'; Abdi (yellow card) 45+2'	Stadium: Stade Geoffroy-Guichard; Attendance: 14,785; Referee: Alexandre Perreau Niel

10 January 2023 18	Saint-Étienne	1–0	Laval	Saint-Étienne
20:45 CET (UTC+1)	Cafaro 59', (yellow card) 60'; Bouchouari (yellow card) 65'	Report	N'Chobi (yellow card) 72'	Stadium: Stade Geoffroy-Guichard; Attendance: 13,603; Referee: Olivier Thual

16 January 2023 19	Niort	0–1	Saint-Étienne	Niort
20:45 CET (UTC+1)	Moutachy (yellow card) 84'	Report	Bouchouari (yellow card) 43'; Briançon (yellow card) 53'; Charbonnier 86'	Stadium: Stade René Gaillard; Referee: Antoine Valnet

28 January 2023 20	Saint-Étienne	2–3	Sochaux	Saint-Étienne
20:45 CET (UTC+1)	Bamba (yellow card) 44'; Krasso (penalty scored) 50'; Charbonnier (yellow card) 57', (goal) 78'	Report	Mauricio 3'; Faussurier (yellow card) 36'; Weissbeck (yellow card) 38'; Ndiaye (yellow card) 75'; Dossou 89'; Sissoko 90+4', (yellow card) 90+6'	Stadium: Stade Geoffroy-Guichard; Attendance: 18,041; Referee: Mikael Lesage

31 January 2023 21	Bastia	2–0	Saint-Étienne	Furiani
20:45 CET (UTC+1)	Vincent (yellow card) 46'; Van Den Kerkhof (penalty scored) 50'; Ducrocq 65'; Kaïboué (yellow card) 66'	Report	Nkounkou (yellow card) 21'	Stadium: Stade Armand-Cesari; Attendance: 10,500; Referee: Abdelatif Kherradji

4 February 2023 22	Saint-Étienne	3–2	Annecy	Saint-Étienne
15:00 CET (UTC+1)	Wadji 18'; Krasso 49'; Cafaro 83', (yellow card) 84'	Report	Pajot 17'; Bosetti 63'; Mouanga (yellow card) 88'	Stadium: Stade Geoffroy-Guichard; Attendance: 17,421; Referee: Aurélien Petit

11 February 2023 23	Saint-Étienne	2–0	Dijon	Saint-Étienne
15:00 CET (UTC+1)	Krasso 12'; Bouchouari 39'; Sow (yellow card) 70'	Report	Fofana (yellow card) 80'	Stadium: Stade Geoffroy-Guichard; Attendance: 21,215; Referee: Guillaume Paradis

20 February 2023 24	Nîmes	1–2	Saint Etienne	Nîmes
20:45 CET (UTC+1)	Tchokounté 68'; Burner (yellow card) 87'	Report	Nkounkou (yellow card) 33', (goal) 34'; Wadji 51', (yellow card) 84'; Monconduit (yellow card) 81'	Stadium: Stade des Antonins; Attendance: 5,527; Referee: Olivier Thual

25 February 2023 25	Saint-Étienne	2–0	Pau	Saint-Étienne
12:00 CET (UTC+1)	Wadji 29'; Krasso (penalty scored) 77'	Report	Evans (yellow card) 90'	Stadium: Stade Geoffroy-Guichard; Attendance: 21,342; Referee: Benjamin Lepaysant

4 March 2023 26	Bordeaux	1–1	Saint Etienne	Bordeaux
15:00 CET (UTC+1)	Badji 46'	Report	Pétrot (yellow card) 37'; Krasso (yellow card) 52', (penalty scored) 82'; Monconduit (yellow card) 85'	Stadium: Matmut Atlantique; Attendance: 29,906; Referee: Nicolas Rainville

11 March 2023 27	Saint-Étienne	1–1	Amiens	Saint-Étienne
19:00 CET (UTC+1)	Krasso (yellow card) 68'; Nkounkou 76'; Cafaro (yellow card) 84'; Monconduit (yellow card) 89'	Report	Fofana (MF) (yellow card) 29'; Gomis 57'	Stadium: Stade Geoffroy-Guichard; Attendance: 23,072; Referee: Stéphanie Frappart

18 March 2023 28	Le Havre	2–2	Saint Etienne	Le Havre
15:00 CET (UTC+1)	Cornette (yellow card) 47'; Alioui 58'; Lekhal (penalty scored) 66'; Thiaré (yellow card) 71'; Sangante (yellow card) 82'	Report	Lobry (yellow card) 32'; Briançon (yellow card) 61'; Bamba 68'; Pétrot (red card) 79'; Krasso 85'	Stadium: Stade Océane; Attendance: 23,264; Referee: Guillaume Paradis

1 April 2023 29	Saint-Étienne	2–0	Niort	Saint-Étienne
15:00 CET (UTC+1)	Wadji 51', 70'; Krasso (penalty missed) 53'	Report	Bernard (yellow card) 58'	Stadium: Stade Geoffroy-Guichard; Attendance: 24,284; Referee: Faouzi Benchabane

8 April 2023 30	Paris FC	2–4	Saint-Etienne	Paris
19:00 CEST (UTC+2)	Hamel 14'; Iglesias 32'; Guilavogui (yellow card) 64'; Chergui (yellow card) 68'	Report	Wadji 1'; Nkounkou 35', 63'; Sow (yellow card) 36'; Fomba (yellow card) 57'; Krasso (penalty scored) 69'; Cafaro (yellow card) 76'	Stadium: Stade Sébastien Charléty; Attendance: 10,727; Referee: Azzédine Souifi

17 April 2023 31	Grenoble	0–2	Saint-Etienne	Grenoble
20:45 CET (UTC+1)	Ba (yellow card) 86'	Report	Nkounkou 46'; Fomba (yellow card) 73'; Krasso 79'	Stadium: Stade des Alpes; Attendance: 14,792; Referee: Pierre Legat

22 April 2023 32	Saint-Étienne	1–3	Metz	Saint-Étienne
15:00 CEST (UTC+2)	Nkounkou 37'	Report	Mikautadze 10', 26' (pen.); Kouao 12'; Camara (red card) 79'	Stadium: Stade Geoffroy-Guichard; Attendance: 33,008; Referee: Nicolas Rainville

29 April 2023 33	Rodez	1–1	Saint-Etienne	Rodez
19:00 CEST (UTC+2)	Danger 48' (pen.); Younoussa (yellow card) 81'	Report	Nkounkou (yellow card) 44'; Fomba (yellow card) 54'; Bamba 83'	Stadium: Stade Paul-Lignon; Attendance: 3,263; Referee: Guillaume Paradis

6 May 2023 34	Saint-Étienne	3–2	Guingamp	Saint-Étienne
19:00 CEST (UTC+2)	Moueffek 21'; Fomba (yellow card) 44'; Bamba (yellow card) 53'; Cafaro 82'; Wadji 88'	Report	El Ouazzani 12'; Sivis (yellow card) 43'; Courtet 45', (yellow card) 70'	Stadium: Stade Geoffroy-Guichard; Attendance: 25,002; Referee: Olivier Thual

13 May 2023 35	Laval	2–1	Saint-Étienne	Laval
19:00 CEST (UTC+2)	Elisor (penalty scored) 31'; Bobichon 50'; Tavares (yellow card) 90+4'	Report	Chambost 38'; Nkounkou (yellow card) 68'	Stadium: Stade Francis Le Basser; Attendance: 8,969; Referee: Abdelatif Kherradji

20 May 2023 36	Saint-Étienne	4–2	Quevilly-Rouen	Saint-Étienne
19:00 CEST (UTC+2)	Cafaro 21'; Chambost 66'; Bamba 73', (yellow card) 81'; Cissokho 89' (o.g.)	Report	Pendant (yellow card) 32'; Bangré 41'; Cissé (yellow card) 70'; Camara 77'; Loric (yellow card) 81'	Stadium: Stade Geoffroy-Guichard; Attendance: 18,528; Referee: Pierre Legat

26 May 2023 37	Caen	2–2	Saint-Étienne	Caen
20:45 CEST (UTC+2)	Ntim (yellow card) 30'; Mendy 83'; Essende 85'	Report	Wadji 15', 23'; Moueffek (yellow card) 57'; Larsonneur (yellow card) 81'	Stadium: Stade Michel d'Ornano; Attendance: 19,537; Referee: Olivier Thual

2 June 2023 38	Saint-Étienne	2–0	Valenciennes	Saint-Étienne
20:45 CEST (UTC+2)	Cafaro (yellow card) 45+1'; Krasso 48'; Appiah (yellow card) 71'; Bamba 81'	Report	Cuffaut (yellow card) 73'; Bonnet (yellow card) 90+2'	Stadium: Stade Geoffroy-Guichard; Attendance: 39,873; Referee: Abdelatif Kherradji

=== Coupe de France ===
29 October 2022 Round 7	Saint-Étienne	0 - 0 (3 - 4 p)	Rodez	Saint-Étienne
15:00	Pintor (yellow card) 50'; Monconduit (yellow card) 72'	Report	Mouyokolo (yellow card) 66'	Stadium: Stade Geoffroy-Guichard; Attendance: 17,085; Referee: (France) Faouzi Benchabane
