= 2023–24 AS Saint-Étienne season =

AS Saint-Étienne
2023–24 season
- Chairman: Bernard Caïazzo
- Manager: Olivier Dall'Oglio
- Stadium: Stade Geoffroy-Guichard
- Ligue 2: 3rd (promoted)
- Coupe de France: Eighth round
- Highest home attendance: Concarneau (37,337), 6 Apr. 2024
- Average home league attendance: 24,608
Away colours

The 2023–24 season was AS Saint-Étienne's 91st season in existence and second consecutive in Ligue 2. They also competed in the Coupe de France.

== Players ==
=== Season squad ===
As of 2 June 2024

Note: Flags indicate national team as defined under FIFA eligibility rules; some limited exceptions apply. Players may hold more than one non-FIFA nationality.

No.	Pos.	Nation	Player
3	DF	FRA	Mickaël Nadé
5	MF	FRA	Florian Tardieu
6	MF	MAR	Benjamin Bouchouari
7	MF	FRA	Thomas Monconduit
8	DF	FRA	Dennis Appiah
9	FW	MLI	Ibrahim Sissoko
10	MF	FRA	Nathanaël Mbuku (on loan from Augsburg)
11	FW	FRA	Irvin Cardona (on loan from Augsburg)
13	DF	MAR	Mahmoud Bentayg
14	MF	FRA	Dylan Chambost
16	GK	SEN	Boubacar Fall
17	FW	CIV	Stéphane Diarra (on loan from Lorient)

No.	Pos.	Nation	Player
18	MF	FRA	Mathieu Cafaro
19	DF	FRA	Léo Pétrot
20	FW	FRA	Maxence Rivera
21	DF	COD	Dylan Batubinsika
23	DF	FRA	Anthony Briançon
25	FW	SEN	Ibrahima Wadji
26	MF	FRA	Lamine Fomba
27	DF	FRA	Yvann Maçon
29	MF	MAR	Aïmen Moueffek
30	GK	FRA	Gautier Larsonneur
34	MF	FRA	Antoine Gauthier
42	GK	ENG	Etienne Green

=== Other players under contract ===
Note: Flags indicate national team as defined under FIFA eligibility rules; some limited exceptions apply. Players may hold more than one non-FIFA nationality.

No.	Pos.	Nation	Player
—	DF	CMR	Bryan Nokoue
—	MF	SEN	El Hadji Dieye

No.	Pos.	Nation	Player
—	FW	FRA	Ayman Aiki
—	FW	GUI	Karim Cissé

=== Out on loan ===
Note: Flags indicate national team as defined under FIFA eligibility rules; some limited exceptions apply. Players may hold more than one non-FIFA nationality.

No.	Pos.	Nation	Player
—	MF	FRA	Louis Mouton (at Pau until 30 June 2024)
—	MF	FRA	Mathys Saban (at Union Titus Pétange until 30 June 2024)

No.	Pos.	Nation	Player
—	FW	FRA	Yanis Lhéry (at Progrès Niederkorn until 30 June 2024)

== Transfers ==
=== In ===
Pos.	Player	Transferred from	Fee	Date	Source
MF	(France) Mathieu Cafaro	(Belgium) Standard Liège	€500,000	1 July 2023	
DF	(France) Niels Nkounkou	(England) Everton	€2,000,000	1 July 2023	
FW	(Mali) Ibrahim Sissoko	(France) Sochaux	Free	6 July 2023	
DF	(Democratic Republic of the Congo) Dylan Batubinsika	(Portugal) Famalicão	Undisclosed	21 July 2023	

=== Out ===
Pos.	Player	Transferred to	Fee	Date	Source
FW	(Ivory Coast) Lenny Pintor	(Austria) LASK	Free	1 July 2023	
MF	(France) Mahdi Camara	(France) Brest	€3,000,000	1 July 2023	
FW	(Ivory Coast) Jean-Philippe Krasso	(Serbia) Red Star Belgrade	Undisclosed	1 July 2023	
DF	(France) Yvann Maçon	(Israel) Maccabi Tel Aviv	Loan	2 July 2023	
MF	(Cameroon) Yvan Neyou	(Spain) Leganés	Undisclosed	1 August 2023	

== Competitions ==
=== Overall record ===
Competition	First match	Last match	Starting round	Record							
Competition	First match	Last match	Starting round	Pld	W	D	L	GF	GA	GD	Win %
Ligue 2	5 August 2023	May 2024	Matchday 1	38	19	8	11	48	31	+17	50.00
Coupe de France	TBD		Seventh round	0	0	0	0	0	0	+0	—
Total				38	19	8	11	48	31	+17	50.00

Last updated: 6 May 2024
Source: Soccerway

=== Ligue 2 ===
==== League table ====
Pos	Team	Pld	W	D	L	GF	GA	GD	Pts	Promotion or Relegation
1	Auxerre (C, P)	38	21	11	6	72	36	+36	74	Promotion to Ligue 1
2	Angers (P)	38	20	8	10	56	42	+14	68	Promotion to Ligue 1
3	Saint-Étienne (O, P)	38	19	8	11	48	31	+17	65	Qualification for promotion play-offs final
4	Rodez	38	16	12	10	62	51	+11	60	Qualification for promotion play-offs semi-final
5	Paris FC	38	16	11	11	49	42	+7	59	Qualification for promotion play-offs semi-final

Updated to match(es) played on 17 May 2024. Source: Ligue 2
Rules for classification: 1) Points; 2) Goal difference; 3) Number of goals scored; 4) Head-to-head goal difference; 5) Fair play points
(C) Champions; (O) Play-off winners; (P) Promoted

==== Results summary ====
Overall								Home						Away					
Pld	W	D	L	GF	GA	GD	Pts	W	D	L	GF	GA	GD	W	D	L	GF	GA	GD
38	19	8	11	48	31	+17	65	10	4	5	24	14	+10	9	4	6	24	17	+7

Last updated: 21 May 2024.
Source: Ligue 2 BKT

==== Results by round ====
Round	1	2	3	4	5	6	7	8	9	10	11	12	13	14	15	16	17	18	19	20	21	22
Ground	H	A	H	A	H	A	A	H	A	H	A	H	H	A	H	A	H	A	H	H	A	H
Result	L	L	W	D	D	W	W	W	W	D	W	W	L	L	L	L	L	D	W	D	W	
Position	16	17	14	14	15	9	8	9	5	5	5	2	3	5	7	8	8	8	6	6	6	

Updated to match(es) played on 23 January 2024. Source: Ligue 2 BKT
A = Away; H = Home; W = Win; D = Draw; L = Loss

==== Matches ====
The league fixtures were unveiled on 29 June 2023.

5 August 2023 1	Saint-Étienne	0–1	Grenoble	Saint-Étienne
15:00 UTC+2	Sissoko (yellow card) 43'; Sow (yellow card) 78'; Charbonnier (penalty missed) 83'	Report	Touray (yellow card) 22'; Sanyang 90+1'	Stadium: Stade Geoffroy-Guichard; Attendance: 25,412; Referee: Pierre Legat

12 August 2023 2	Rodez	2–1	Saint-Étienne	Rodez
16:00 UTC+2	Valério 41'; Buadés 90+5'	Report	Sissoko 58' (pen.); Briançon (yellow card) 72'; Chambost (yellow card) 90+1'	Stadium: Stade Paul-Lignon; Referee: Abdelatif Kherradji

19 August 2023 3	Saint-Étienne	2–1	Quevilly-Rouen	Saint-Étienne
19:00 UTC+2	Sissoko 29' (pen.), 45+1' (pen.)	Report	Sidibé (yellow card) 11'; Cissé (yellow card) 27'; Pierret 54' (yellow card) 90+1'	Stadium: Stade Geoffroy-Guichard; Attendance: 24,103; Referee: Mikaël Lesage

28 August 2023 4	Annecy	1–1	Saint-Étienne	Annecy
20:45 UTC+2	Caddy 26' (pen.); Larose (yellow card) 62'; Escales (yellow card) 75'	Report	Chambost 48'; Appiah (yellow card) 69'; Bouchouari (yellow card) 88'	Stadium: Parc des Sports; Attendance: 12,467; Referee: Azzédine Souifi

2 September 2023 5	Saint-Étienne	0–0	Valenciennes	Saint-Étienne
19:00 UTC+2	Bentayg (yellow card) 23'; Bouchouari (yellow card) 55'; Sissoko (yellow card) 60'; Batubinsika (yellow card) 63'; Pétrot (yellow card) 66'; Appiah (yellow card) 69'; Fomba (yellow card) 90+4'	Report	Masson (yellow card) 10'; Jung (yellow card) 90+1'; Boudraa (yellow card) 90+4'	Stadium: Stade Geoffroy-Guichard; Attendance: 22,687; Referee: Thomas Léonard

16 September 2023 6	Caen	1–2	Saint-Étienne	Caen
15:00 UTC+2	Henry (yellow card) 35'; Abdi (yellow card) 67'; Mandrea (yellow card) 77'; Mendy 90+4'	Report	Tardieu 30' (pen.); Fomba (yellow card) 77'; Sissoko 88'	Stadium: Stade Michel d'Ornano; Attendance: 19,013; Referee: Abdelatif Kherradji

23 September 2023 7	Concarneau	0–1	Saint-Étienne	Lorient
19:00 UTC+2	Etuin (yellow card) 70'	Report	Batubinsika (yellow card) 32'; Sissoko 73'	Stadium: Stade du Moustoir; Attendance: 6,010; Referee: Antoine Valnet

4 October 2023 8	Saint-Étienne	2–0	Dunkerque	Saint-Étienne
18:45 UTC+2	Bouchaouri (yellow card) 38'; Sissoko 83' (pen.); Cafaro 86'	Report	Balijon (yellow card) 81'; Boissier (yellow card) 81'	Stadium: Stade Geoffroy-Guichard; Attendance: 9,282; Referee: Florent Batta

30 September 2023 9	Troyes	0–1	Saint-Étienne	Troyes
15:00 UTC+2	Boura (yellow card) 73'	Report	Pétrot (yellow card) 54'; Moueffek 90+3'	Stadium: Stade de l'Aube; Attendance: 7,378; Referee: Pierre Legat

7 October 2023 10	Saint-Étienne	0–0	Ajaccio	Saint-Étienne
19:00 UTC+2	Cafaro (yellow card) 27'; Briançon (yellow card) 55'	Report	Quemper (yellow card) 85'; Michel (yellow card) 86'	Stadium: Stade Geoffroy-Guichard; Attendance: 11,760; Referee: Benjamin Lepaysant

23 October 2023 11	Laval	0–1	Saint-Étienne	Laval
20:45 UTC+2	Baldé (yellow card) 45+3'	Report	Sissoko 13'; Larsonneur (yellow card) 86'	Stadium: Stade Francis Le Basser; Attendance: 9,394; Referee: Mikaël Lesage

30 October 2023 12	Saint-Étienne	2–0	Angers	Saint-Étienne
20:45 UTC+1	Sissoko 50'; Pétrot 58'; Bouchouari (yellow card) 60'; Lobry (yellow card) 81'	Report	Bamba (yellow card) 83'	Stadium: Stade Geoffroy-Guichard; Attendance: 27,153; Referee: Guillaume Paradis

4 November 2023 13	Saint-Étienne	0–1	Paris FC	Saint-Étienne
15:00 UTC+1		Report	Gory 72'; Koré (yellow card) 74'; Hamel (yellow card) 80'; Nkambadio (yellow card) 90+1'	Stadium: Stade Geoffroy-Guichard; Attendance: 35,563; Referee: Antoine Valnet

11 November 2023 14	Auxerre	5–2	Saint-Étienne	Auxerre
19:00 UTC+1	Onaiwu 3', 37', 67'; Perrin 21'; Dioussé (yellow card) 90+5'; Sinayoko 82'	Report	Cafaro 31'; Bouchouari (yellow card) 45+5'; Tardieu (yellow card) 62'; Bentayg 80'	Stadium: Stade de l'Abbé Deschamps; Attendance: 16,806; Referee: Benjamin Lepaysant

25 November 2023 15	Saint-Étienne	1–2	Pau	Saint-Étienne
15:00 CET	Charbonnier 9'; Bouchouari (yellow card) 54'; Tardieu (yellow card) 90'; Briançon (yellow card) 90+1'	Report	Kanté (yellow card) 14'; Sylla (yellow card) 62'; Saivet 75' (pen.); D'Almeida 78' (yellow card) 90+1'	Stadium: Stade Geoffroy-Guichard; Attendance: 21,709; Referee: (France) Faouzi Benchabane

2 December 2023 16	Amiens SC	1–0	Saint-Étienne	Amiens
19:00 CET	Gene (yellow card) 24'; Leautey 45'; Kaïboué (yellow card) 60'; Fofana (yellow card) 62'	Report	Chambost (yellow card) 26'	Stadium: Stade de la Licorne; Attendance: 8,712; Referee: (France) Mikael Lesage

5 December 2023 17	Saint-Étienne	1–3	Guingamp	Saint-Étienne
20:45 CET	Moueffek 21'; Tardieu (yellow card) 57'; Cissé (yellow card) 89'	Report	Sidibé 42'; Guillaume 55'; Courtet 87'	Stadium: Stade Geoffroy-Guichard; Attendance: 17,942; Referee: (France) Olivier Thual

16 December 2023 18	Bordeaux	0–0	Saint-Étienne	Bordeaux
15:00 CET		Report	Briançon (yellow card) 6'; Monconduit (yellow card) 25'; Pétrot (yellow card) 77'	Stadium: Matmut Atlantique; Attendance: 37,658; Referee: (France) Romain Delpech

19 December 2023 19	Saint-Étienne	3–2	Bastia	Saint-Étienne
20:45 CET	Chambost 5' 9'; Tardieu (yellow card) 42'; Briançon (yellow card) 51'; Cafaro 63'	Report	Vincent (yellow card) 41'; Roncaglia (yellow card) 48'; Alfarela 71' (pen.); Keita 76'	Stadium: Stade Geoffroy-Guichard; Attendance: 16,900; Referee: (France) Abdelatif Kherradji

13 January 2024 20	Saint-Étienne	0–0	Laval	Saint-Étienne
15:00 CET		Report		Stadium: Stade Geoffroy-Guichard; Attendance: 18,106; Referee: (France) Nicolas Rainville

23 January 2024 21	Pau	0–1	Saint-Étienne	Bizanos
20:45 CET	Kouassi (yellow card) 36'; D'Almeida (yellow card) 85'; Kamara (yellow card) 90+5'	Report	Chambost 38'	Stadium: Nouste Camp; Attendance: 3,524; Referee: (France) Eric Wattellier

27 January 2024 22	Saint-Étienne	0–1	Amiens	Saint-Étienne
15:00 CET	Cafaro (yellow card) 53'	Report	Do Couto 42'; Assogba (yellow card) 57'; Ring (yellow card) 90'; Léautey (yellow card) 90+2'	Stadium: Stade Geoffroy-Guichard; Attendance: 18,612; Referee: Thierry Bouille

3 February 2024 23	Dunkerque	1–0	Saint-Étienne	Dunkirk
15:00 CET	Sanganté 81'	Report		Stadium: Stade Marcel-Tribut; Attendance: 4,933; Referee: Ahmed Taleb

12 February 2024 24	Saint-Étienne	5–0	Troyes	Saint-Étienne
20:45 CET	Ndiaye 16' (o.g.); Nadé (yellow card) 20'; Briançon (yellow card) 36' (goal) 78'; Sissoko 38'; Monconduit (yellow card) 45+2'; Mbuku 51'; Cafaro (yellow card) 55'; Maçon 63'; Cardona (yellow card) 90'	Report	Alemdar (yellow card) 90'	Stadium: Stade Geoffroy-Guichard; Attendance: 17,075; Referee: Azzédine Souifi

17 February 2024 25	Angers	0–3	Saint-Étienne	Angers
15:00 CET	Raolisoa (yellow card) 71'; Niane (yellow card) 83'; Abdelli (yellow card) 90+1'	Report	Cardona 42', 45'; Lefort 64' (o.g.); Monconduit (yellow card) 76'	Stadium: Stade Raymond Kopa; Attendance: 15,662; Referee: Nicolas Rainville

24 February 2024 26	Saint-Étienne	2–1	Annecy	Saint-Étienne
15:00 CET	Cardona 10'; Sissoko 41'; Chambost (yellow card) 90+1'; Maçon (yellow card) 90+3'; Fomba (yellow card) 90+4'	Report	Ntamack 87' (pen.)	Stadium: Stade Geoffroy-Guichard; Attendance: 21,179; Referee: Antoine Valnet

2 March 2024 27	Paris FC	0–0	Saint-Étienne	Paris
15:00 CET	Chergui (yellow card) 45'	Report	Appiah (yellow card) 40'; Maçon (yellow card) 53'	Stadium: Stade Charléty; Attendance: 17,358; Referee: Benjamin Lepaysant

9 March 2024 28	Saint-Étienne	1–0	Auxerre	Saint-Étienne
15:00 CET	Batubinsika (yellow card) 24'; Cardona 55'; Nadé (yellow card) 68'	Report	Hein (yellow card) 9'; Pellenard (yellow card) 78'; Jubal (yellow card) 85'	Stadium: Stade Geoffroy-Guichard; Attendance: 36,277; Referee: Olivier Thual

16 March 2024 29	Bastia	0–4	Saint-Étienne	Bastia
19:00 CET	Roncaglia (yellow card) 22'; Alfarela (yellow card) 45+2'	Report	Chambost 16'; Mbuku (yellow card) 45+2', (goal) 45+2' (pen.); Cardona 67'; Mbuku 79'	Stadium: Stade Furiani; Attendance: 11,598; Referee: Pierre Gaillouste

30 March 2024 30	Valenciennes	0–2	Saint-Étienne	Valenciennes
15:00 CET		Report	Cardona (yellow card) 10' (goal) 31'; Sissoko 23'	Stadium: Stade du Hainaut; Attendance: 9,251; Referee: Mikaël Lesage

6 April 2024 31	Saint-Étienne	1–0	Concarneau	Saint-Étienne
15:00 UTC+2	Nadé 23'; Moueffek (yellow card) 87'	Report	Urie (yellow card) 87'	Stadium: Stade Geoffroy-Guichard; Attendance: 37,337; Referee: Abdelatif Kherradji

13 April 2024 32	AC Ajaccio	2–0	Saint-Étienne	Ajaccio
15:00 UTC+2	Ibayi 17' (pen.); Vidal 45+2'; Nouri (yellow card) 90+6'	Report	Bouchouari (yellow card) 15'; Bentayg (yellow card) 80'; Monconduit (red card) 84'	Stadium: Stade Michel Moretti; Attendance: 5,259; Referee: Pierre Legat

20 April 2024 33	Saint-Étienne	2–1	Bordeaux	Saint-Étienne
19:00 UTC+2	Monconduit (yellow card) 18'; Nadé (yellow card) 62' (red card) 74'; Moueffek (yellow card) 74'; Briançon (yellow card) 85'; Cardona 90+1', 90+5'	Report	Ignatenko (yellow card) 32'; Díaz 42'; Nsimba (yellow card) 74'; Davitashvili (yellow card) 74'; Pitu (yellow card) 83'	Stadium: Stade Geoffroy-Guichard; Attendance: 35,317; Referee: Jérôme Brisard

23 April 2024 34	Grenoble	0–2	Saint-Étienne	Grenoble
20:45 UTC+2	Mendy (yellow card) 10'	Report	Cafaro (yellow card) 62'; Batubinsika 80'; Chambost 87'	Stadium: Stade des Alpes; Attendance: 15,230; Referee: Benjamin Lepaysant

27 April 2024 35	Saint-Étienne	1–0	Caen	Saint-Étienne
15:00 UTC+2	Moueffek 5'	Report	Abdi (yellow card) 44'; Brahimi (yellow card) 70'; Henry (yellow card) 76'; Traoré (red card) 90+3'	Stadium: Stade Geoffroy-Guichard; Attendance: 35,445; Referee: Nicolas Rainville

4 May 2024 36	Guingamp	2–2	Saint-Étienne	Guingamp
19:00 UTC+2	El Ouazzani 67' (pen.); Siwe 84'; Sivis (yellow card) 90+5' (yellow-red card) 90+5'	Report	Moueffek 22'; Cafaro 45+2' (pen.); Cardona (yellow card) 83'; Chambost (yellow card) 90+2'; Larsonneur (yellow card) 90+4'	Stadium: Stade de Roudourou; Attendance: 11,224; Referee: Guillaume Paradis

10 May 2024 37	Saint-Étienne	1–1	Rodez	Saint-Étienne
20:45 UTC+2	Nadé 38'; Appiah (yellow card) 43'; Cafaro (yellow card) 50'; Maçon (yellow card) 82'	Report	Mambo (yellow card) 31'; Abdallah (yellow card) 78'; Rajot 79'	Stadium: Stade Geoffroy-Guichard; Attendance: 35,701; Referee: Mikaël Lesage

17 May 2024 38	Quevilly-Rouen	2–1	Saint-Étienne	Rouen
20:45 UTC+2	Gbelle (yellow card) 33'; Soumano 60'; Coulibaly 81'; Cissokho (yellow card) 88'	Report	Cissokho 89'	Stadium: Stade Robert Diochon; Attendance: 8,084; Referee: Marc Bollengier

=== Promotion Play-offs ===
24 May 2024	Saint-Étienne	v	Rodez	Saint-Étienne
20:30 UTC+2				Stadium: Stade Geoffroy-Guichard

=== Coupe de France ===
18 November 2023 Seventh round	Bourg-Péronnas	0–3	Saint-Étienne	Bourg-en-Bresse
13:45 CET	Nathan Vitré (yellow card) 43'; Roger Tamba M'Pinda (yellow card) 47'	Report	Darling Baldi (yellow card) 7'; Rivera 45'; Charbonnier 54' 73'	Stadium: Stade Marcel-Verchère; Attendance: 5,142; Referee: (France) Aurélien Petit

9 December 2023 Eighth round	Saint-Étienne	0–1	Nîmes	Saint-Étienne
15:00 CET	Moueffek (yellow card) 81'	Report	Picouleau 19'; Sy (yellow card) 25'; Ondoa (yellow card) 55'; Hamza Sbaï (yellow card) 71'; Doukansy (yellow card) 75'; Doucouré (yellow card) 83'	Stadium: Stade Geoffroy-Guichard; Attendance: 11,149; Referee: (France) Antoine Valnet
