= François Letexier =

French football referee (born 1989)

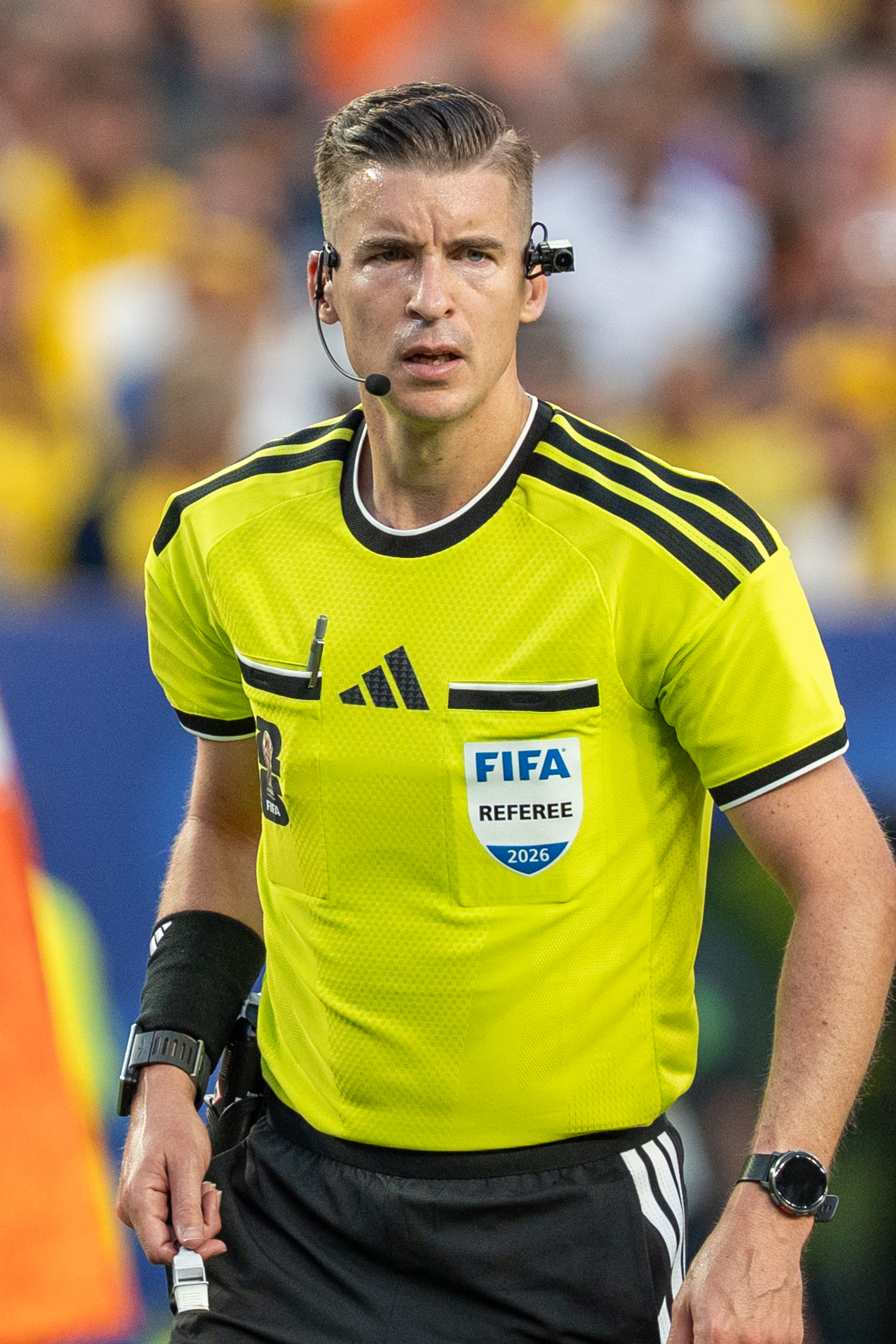
- Letexier in 2026
- Born: 23 April 1989 (age 37); Bédée, France

Domestic
Years	League	Role
2015–	Ligue 2	Referee
2016–	Ligue 1	Referee

International
Years	League	Role
2017–	FIFA listed	Referee

François Letexier (Note: French pronunciation: [fʁɑ̃swa lətɛksje]) (born 23 April 1989) is a French football referee who has officiated in Ligue 1 since January 2016. He has been a FIFA referee since 2017 and is ranked as a UEFA elite category referee. Letexier has taken charge in every major UEFA club and international-level tournament. He is also the youngest referee to officiate a UEFA Euro final, as he took charge of the UEFA Euro 2024 final when he was 35 years old.

== Life and career ==
François Letexier was born on 23 April 1989 in the Bédée commune of Brittany, France. He is a lawyer with expertise in rental disputes and illegal occupation, and he also works as a court bailiff part-time. He is married, and a father of two sons.

Letexier was put on the FIFA referees list in 2017, and he officiated his first senior international match the following year between Bulgaria and Bosnia and Herzegovina. He was promoted to the UEFA elite category referee in 2022. He has officiated in many major club and international-level tournaments, including the 2019 UEFA Youth League final between Porto and Chelsea; the 2021 Coupe de France final between Monaco and Paris Saint-Germain; the 2021 UEFA Europa League final between Villarreal and Manchester United as VAR, and the 2023 UEFA Super Cup between Manchester City and Sevilla. Letexier also refereed the 2026 UEFA Europa League final between SC Freiburg and Aston Villa, as well as three matches of the 2021 UEFA European Under-21 Championship, including the quarter-final between Portugal and Italy.

== Games officiated ==
=== Ligue 1 and Ligue 2 matches ===
On 23 January 2016, Letexier began officiating in Ligue 1; his first match was between Montpellier and Caen. On 20 August 2022, Letexier refereed a Ligue 2 match between Saint-Étienne and Le Havre, issuing red cards to three Saint-Étienne players (Anthony Briançon, Mathieu Cafaro and Etienne Green) and a member of the Saint-Étienne staff.

Letexier was the subject of scrutiny following the Week 12 Ligue 1 match between Nice and Nantes on 19 October 2022. In the 19th minute, he did not award a penalty to Nantes when the ball hit both of Mattia Viti's arms within the six-yard box. Near the end of the match, he awarded a penalty to Nice when the ball hit Jean-Charles Castelletto's arm. Letexier issued seven yellow cards in total, and showed red cards to Nantes' Kader Bamba and their goalkeeper Alban Lafont. Days later, after receiving death threats on social media, Letexier defended his decisions in an interview with L'Équipe.

On 27 October 2024, Letexier was at the centre of attention during a Ligue 1 match between Marseille and Paris Saint-Germain when he sent off Marseille's Amine Harit for his foul on PSG's Marquinhos. After Letexier's decision to send Harit off caused backlash online, Letexier defended the decision, explaining that he felt that Harit's action put Marquinhos' physical integrity at risk.

=== Real Madrid CF matches ===
As of October 2026, Letexier has officiated seven matches involving Real Madrid, including the first leg of the UEFA Champions League quarterfinal knockout tie between Real Madrid and Manchester City at the Santiago Bernabéu Stadium on 9 April 2024, which finished 3–3. A year prior to the match, he officiated two other games involving Real Madrid; the first match was against Chelsea, and the second match was against Napoli. He was appointed by UEFA in May 2024 as the fourth official for the UEFA Champions League final between Borussia Dortmund and Real Madrid. He also refereed the second leg of the Champions League quarter-final between Real Madrid and Arsenal in April 2025.

UEFA appointed Letexier to officiate the first leg of the 2025–26 UEFA Champions League knockout match between Benfica and Real Madrid, which was played at the Estádio da Luz in Lisbon on 17 February 2026. After Vinícius Júnior scored a winning goal for Real Madrid, he received a yellow card for celebrating the goal, and in the 52nd minute of the match, he told Letexier that Gianluca Prestianni of Benfica racially abused him. In response, Letexier paused the match for eight minutes by crossing his arms, which activated the UEFA's anti-racism protocol. Prestianni denied insulting Vinícius, who later criticised the protocol.

=== UEFA Euro 2024 ===
Weeks after Letexier was selected to officiate at the Men's Olympic Games football tournament, he was chosen as a referee for the UEFA Euro 2024 in Germany. Letexier refereed three games, as well as the final between England and Spain on 11 July, making him the youngest referee to take charge of a UEFA Euro Final at the age of 35. This beat the previous record of Swedish official Anders Frisk, who was 37 years old when he refereed the UEFA Euro 2000 final. 10 days after the Euro 2024 final, Letexier was assigned the opening round Group D pool match between Japan and Paraguay at the 2024 Summer Olympics.

=== FIFA Club World Cup 2025 ===
The following year, Letexier was selected to officiate at the 2025 FIFA Club World Cup in the United States, where he took charge of a group stage match between Benfica and Bayern Munich, the Brazilian rivalry between Palmeiras and Botafogo in the round of 16, and a semi-final between Chelsea and Fluminense.

=== 2026 FIFA World Cup ===
Michael Oliver was originally appointed to the match between Ivory Coast and Ecuador, but he pulled out due to a minor injury and was subsequently replaced by Letexier, making the 2026 FIFA World Cup the first World Cup Letexier officiated. On 27 June, Letexier refereed another match, this time between Cape Verde and Saudi Arabia.

==== Argentina vs. Egypt match ====
On 7 July 2026, Letexier, assisted by Cyril Mugnier and Mehdi Rahmouni, officiated the round of 16 match between Argentina and Egypt. During the match, he overturned an Egyptian goal by Mostafa Ziko following VAR review for a foul on Lisandro Martínez by Marwan Attia in the build-up. Though the decision was technically grounded in the IFAB rules governing the VAR protocol, critics noted the incident occurred several seconds before the goal and far from the scoring action. Argentina came from behind, after initially going down 2–0, to win the match 3–2 late in the game. However, in the build-up to Enzo Fernández's match-winning goal for Argentina in injury time, Mohamed Salah lost the ball and went to ground after being tackled by Julián Alvarez inside the Argentine penalty area; despite protests from the Egyptian players and staff for an alleged foul on Salah, the goal stood, a decision which drew criticism from some media outlets, who likened the two incidents to one another, despite their different outcomes. Letexier's officiating decisions were strongly criticised by the Egyptian team following the match. Egyptian left winger Ziko, who had an apparent goal disallowed, claimed the refereeing was "not fair" and "rigged", while Egyptian manager Hossam Hassan criticised Letexier, claiming he had displayed favouritism towards Argentina. FIFA referee chief Pierluigi Collina defended the performance of the match officials. As a response to online abuse, Letexier deactivated his Instagram account.

Letexier and fellow French official Clément Turpin were sidelined from the remainder of the World Cup, (though Jérôme Brisard remained as a VAR) because France was in the semi-final, and FIFA generally removes officials whose countries reach the semi-finals to avoid a conflict of interest.

== Major matches refereed ==
Date	Match	Tournament	Venue	Result	Ref
16 August 2023	Manchester City vs. Sevilla	2023 UEFA Super Cup	Karaiskakis Stadium, Piraeus	1–1 (5–4 on penalties)	
14 July 2024	Spain vs. England	UEFA Euro 2024 final	Olimpiastadion, Berlin	2–1	
20 May 2026	SC Freiburg vs. Aston Villa	2026 UEFA Europa League final	Beşiktaş Stadium, Istanbul	0–3	

== Honours ==
- IFFHS World's Best Referee: 2024

== Notes ==
Sporting positions (France) François Letexier
Preceded by 2022 UEFA Super Cup (England) Michael Oliver	2023 UEFA Super Cup	Succeeded by 2024 UEFA Super Cup (Switzerland) Sandro Schärer
Preceded by UEFA Euro 2020 final (Netherlands) Björn Kuipers	UEFA Euro 2024 final	Succeeded by UEFA Euro 2028 final (N/A) to be determined
Preceded by 2025 (Germany) Felix Zwayer	2026 UEFA Europa League final	Succeeded by 2027 (N/A) to be determined
