= Mickaël Nadé =

French footballer (born 1999)

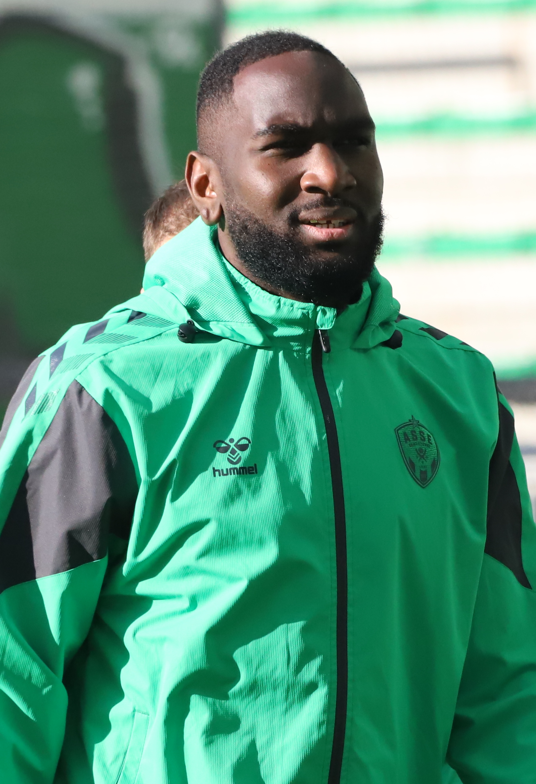
- Nadé with Saint-Étienne in 2025

Personal information
- Date of birth: 4 March 1999 (age 27)
- Place of birth: Sarcelles, France
- Height: 1.72 m (5 ft 8 in)
- Position: Defender

Team information
- Current team: Rodina Moscow (on loan from Dubai United)
- Number: 75

Youth career
- –2014: AAS Sarcelles
- 2014–2017: Saint-Étienne

Senior career*
Years	Team	Apps	(Gls)
2016–2024	Saint-Étienne B	39	(1)
2017–2026	Saint-Étienne	130	(7)
2020–2021	→ Quevilly-Rouen (loan)	30	(1)
2026–	Dubai United	0	(0)
2026–	→ Rodina Moscow (loan)	8	(0)
- * Club domestic league appearances and goals as of 7 November 2026

Mickaël Nadé (born 4 March 1999) is a French professional footballer who plays as defender for Russian Premier League club Rodina Moscow on loan from Emirati club Dubai United.

== Career ==
Nadé is a youth exponent of AAS Sarcelles. In July 2014, he joined the youth side of Saint-Étienne. He made his Ligue 1 debut on 20 May 2017 against Nancy.

In July 2020, Nadé joined Quevilly-Rouen on a season-long loan.

On 27 August 2026, Nadé moved to Dubai United in the United Arab Emirates. On the same day, he was loaned to Rodina Moscow in Russia for the 2026–27 season.

== Personal life ==
Born in France, Nadé holds Ivorian and French nationalities.

== Career statistics ==
As of match played 7 November 2026

Club	Season	League			Cup		Continental		Other		Total	
Club	Season	Division	Apps	Goals	Apps	Goals	Apps	Goals	Apps	Goals	Apps	Goals
Saint-Étienne B	2016–17	Championnat National 2	7	1	—		—		—		7	1
Saint-Étienne B	2017–18	Championnat National 2	4	0	—		—		—		4	0
Saint-Étienne B	2018–19	Championnat National 1	16	0	—		—		—		16	0
Saint-Étienne B	2019–20	Championnat National 1	9	0	—		—		—		9	0
Saint-Étienne B	2022–23	Championnat National 2	1	0	—		—		—		1	0
Saint-Étienne B	2023–24	Championnat National 2	1	0	—		—		—		1	0
Saint-Étienne B	2024–25	Championnat National 2	1	0	—		—		—		1	0
Saint-Étienne B	Total		39	1	0	0	0	0	0	0	39	1
Saint-Étienne	2016–17	Ligue 1	1	0	0	0	0	0	—		1	0
Saint-Étienne	2018–19	Ligue 1	0	0	0	0	—		—		0	0
Saint-Étienne	2019–20	Ligue 1	0	0	0	0	0	0	—		0	0
Saint-Étienne	2021–22	Ligue 1	30	1	3	1	—		1 (Note: Appearance in relegation play-offs)	0	34	2
Saint-Étienne	2022–23	Ligue 2	16	1	0	0	—		—		16	1
Saint-Étienne	2023–24	Ligue 2	23	2	2	0	—		3 (Note: Appearances in promotion play-offs)	0	28	2
Saint-Étienne	2024–25	Ligue 1	26	1	0	0	—		—		26	1
Saint-Étienne	2025–26	Ligue 2	34	2	3	0	—		2	0	39	2
Saint-Étienne	Total		130	7	8	1	0	0	6	0	144	8
Quevilly-Rouen (loan)	2020–21	Ligue 3	30	1	3	0	—		—		33	1
Rodina Moscow (loan)	2026–27	Russian Premier League	8	0	1	0	—		—		9	0
Career total			207	9	12	1	0	0	6	0	225	10
