= Benjamin Bouchouari =

Morocco international footballer (born 2001)

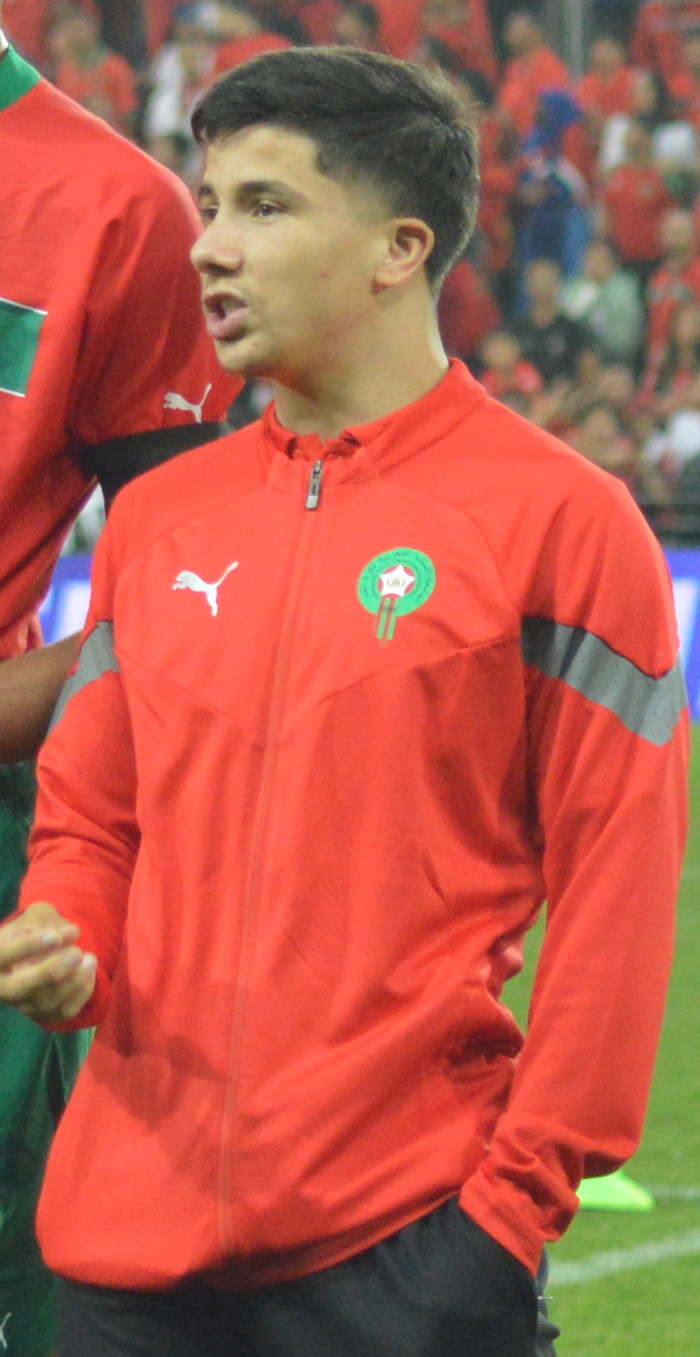
- Bouchouari in 2023

Personal information
- Date of birth: 13 November 2001 (age 24)
- Place of birth: Borgerhout, Belgium
- Height: 1.65 m (5 ft 5 in)
- Position: Midfielder

Team information
- Current team: Trabzonspor
- Number: 8

Youth career
- 2019–2020: Fortuna Sittard

Senior career*
Years	Team	Apps	(Gls)
2020–2022	Roda JC	65	(3)
2022–2025	Saint-Étienne	93	(2)
2025–	Trabzonspor	17	(0)

International career^{‡}
2022–2024	Morocco Olympic	17	(1)
2023–	Morocco	0	(0)
Medal record
Men's football
Representing Morocco
U-23 Africa Cup of Nations
Winner	2023 Morocco
Olympic Games
Bronze medal – third place	2024 Paris	Team
- * Club domestic league appearances and goals as of 10 June 2026 ‡ National team caps and goals as of 23 May 2025 (UTC)

Benjamin Bouchouari (Arabic: بنيامين بوشواري; born 13 November 2001) is a professional footballer who plays as a midfielder for Süper Lig club Trabzonspor. Born in Belgium, he plays Morocco national team.

== Club career ==
=== Early life and youth career ===
Born in Borgerhout, Belgium, Bouchouari began his career from the youth division of Fortuna Sittard and was a part of their under-19 setup. He then joined the youth division of Roda JC and was a part of their under-19 and under-21 squads.

=== Roda JC ===
Bouchouari signed his first senior contract with Dutch and current Eerste Divisie club Roda JC on 2020. He would represent for the club in 2020–21 Eerste Divisie. He made his maiden appearance for the club in the KNVB Cup match against Fortuna Sittard on 28 October 2020 as a substitute for Patrick Pflücke in the 77th minute of the match. The match ended 2–0 to Fortuna Sittard. Bouchouari made his debut league appearance against Jong FC Utrecht on 9 November 2020. He started as a substitute in the 81st minute of the game for Patrick Pflücke. The match ended 2–0 with Roda JC losing the match. He scored his debut goal for the club against Excelsior on 15 February 2021 in the 83rd minute of the game, which they won 1–3.

=== Saint-Étienne ===
On 16 August 2022, Bouchouari signed a three-year contract with Saint-Étienne in France. In his first season at the club, Bouchouari was named in the UNFP Ligue 2 Team of the Year.

=== Trabzonspor ===
On 5 September 2025, Bouchouari signed a 3+1-year contract with Trabzonspor in Turkey.

== International career ==
Born in Belgium, Bouchouari holds Moroccan nationality by descent. He opted to represent the Morocco U23s in 2021.

In June 2023, he was included in the final squad of the under-23 national team for the 2023 U-23 Africa Cup of Nations, hosted by Morocco itself, where the Atlas Lions won their first title and qualified for the 2024 Summer Olympics.

== Career statistics ==
As of match played 22 May 2026

Appearances and goals by club, season and competition
Club	Season	League			National cup (Note: Includes KNVB Cup, Coupe de France, Turkish Cup)		Europe		Other		Total	
Club	Season	Division	Apps	Goals	Apps	Goals	Apps	Goals	Apps	Goals	Apps	Goals
Roda JC	2020–21	Eerste Divisie	28	1	1	0	–		2 (Note: Appearances in Eredivisie play-offs)	0	31	1
Roda JC	2021–22	Eerste Divisie	36	2	0	0	–		1	0	37	2
Roda JC	2022–23	Eerste Divisie	1	0	0	0	–		–		1	0
Roda JC	Total		65	3	1	0	–		3	0	69	3
Saint-Étienne	2022–23	Ligue 2	34	1	0	0	–		–		34	1
Saint-Étienne	2023–24	Ligue 2	34	0	1	0	–		1 (Note: Appearance in Ligue 2 promotion play-offs)	0	36	0
Saint-Étienne	2024–25	Ligue 1	25	1	1	0	–		–		26	1
Saint-Étienne	Total		93	2	2	0	–		1	0	96	2
Trabzonspor	2025–26	Süper Lig	17	0	8	0	–		1 (Note: Appearance in Turkish Super Cup)	0	26	0
Trabzonspor	2026–27	Süper Lig	0	0	0	0	0	0	0	0	0	0
Trabzonspor	Total		0	0	0	0	0	0	0	0	0	0
Career total			175	5	11	0	0	0	5	0	191	5

== Honours ==
Trabzonspor

- Turkish Cup: 2025–26

Morocco U23

- U-23 Africa Cup of Nations: 2023
- Olympic Bronze Medal: 2024

Individual

- UNFP Ligue 2 Team of the Year: 2022–23
