= Dylan Chambost =

French footballer (born 1997)

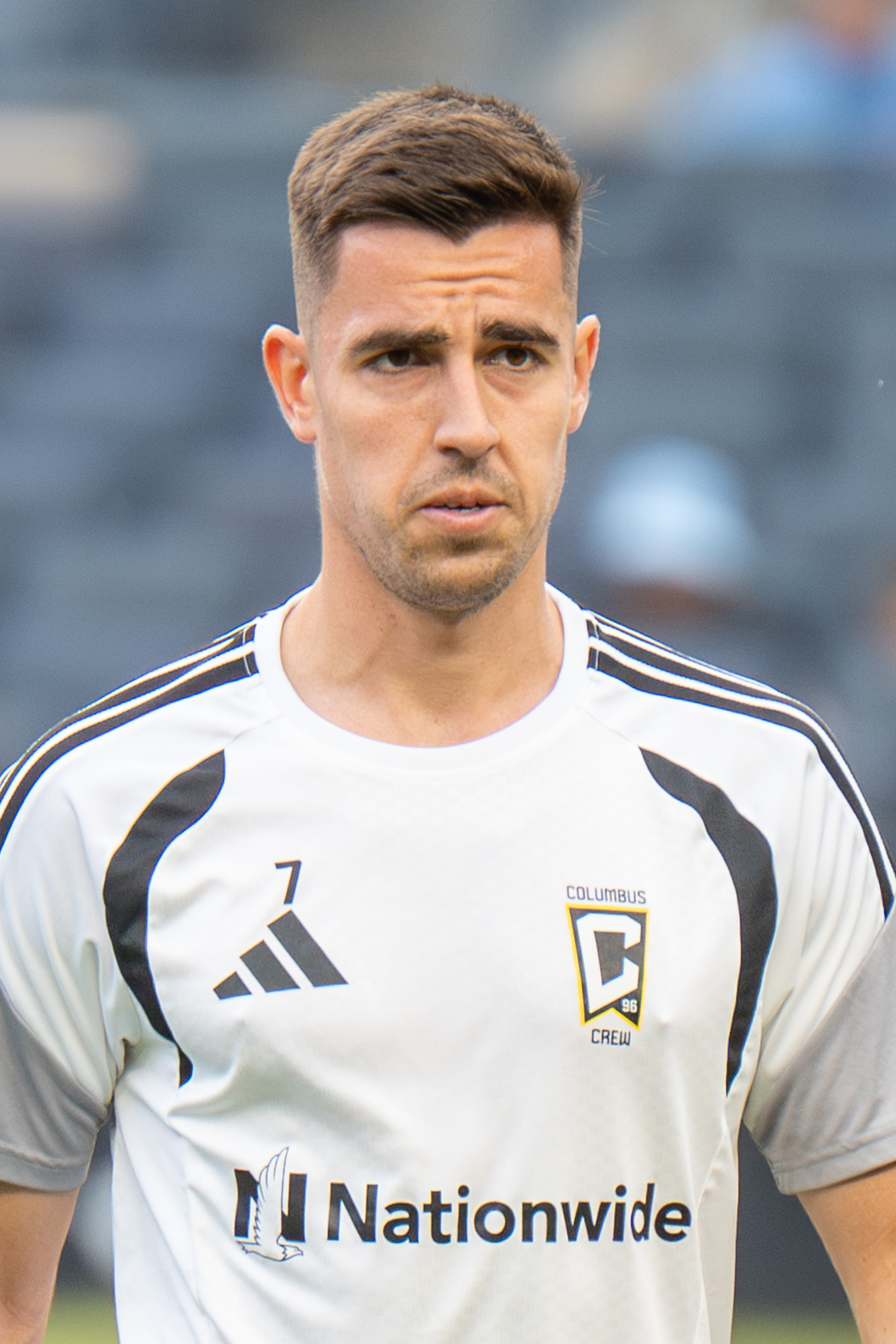
- Chambost with the Columbus Crew in 2026

Personal information
- Date of birth: 19 August 1997 (age 29)
- Place of birth: Annecy, France
- Height: 1.77 m (5 ft 10 in)
- Position: Midfielder

Team information
- Current team: Columbus Crew
- Number: 7

Youth career
- 2003–2007: ES Veauche
- 2007–2016: Saint-Étienne

Senior career*
Years	Team	Apps	(Gls)
2016–2019	Saint-Étienne B	74	(20)
2018–2019	Saint-Étienne	0	(0)
2019–2022	Troyes	70	(2)
2021–2022	Troyes B	2	(0)
2022–2024	Saint-Étienne	61	(9)
2024–	Columbus Crew	74	(1)
- * Club domestic league appearances and goals as of 8 November 2026

Dylan Chambost (French: [ʃɑ̃bo]; born 19 August 1997) is a French professional footballer who plays as midfielder for Major League Soccer club Columbus Crew.

== Career ==
=== Saint-Étienne ===
Chambost began his footballing career with ES Veauche before being recruited to join the academy of Saint-Étienne, being part of the teams that won the under-13 and under-17 league championships. He signed his first professional contract with the club on 18 May 2017. Upon signing, Chambost stated, "I did all my training at ASSE. It was my dream to become professional here." While playing for Saint-Étienne B, he was named captain for the 2017–18 season, leading the reserve team to promotion to National 2. Following the promotion and a successful individual season in which he netted 12 times and assisted nine, Chambost signed a two-year contract extension with Les Verts, and would retain his captaincy for the 'B' team for the following season.

Chambost received his first professional appearance during a Coupe de France match on 24 January 2018 versus Troyes, coming on as a second half substitute. He appeared in just one more Coupe de France game the following year.

=== Troyes ===
On 1 July 2019, Chambost agreed to sign for three years with Troyes, reuniting with his former Saint-Étienne B coach, Laurent Batlles, with the player himself stating that he needed a move because "my future was blocked at ASSE". He made his debut for his new club on 2 August 2019, in a 2–1 Ligue 2 loss to Clermont, during which he also received a red card. Chambost scored his first goal for Troyes in September, a second-half stoppage time winner to prevail 2–1 against Caen.

=== Return to Saint-Étienne ===
On 20 June 2022, Chambost returned to Saint-Étienne, signing a two-year contract with the club and reuniting him once more with Laurent Batlles. He fractured his wrist in a preseason match which caused him to miss the first four matches of the new season, with his return coming in an away fixture at Valenciennes on 27 August. Chambost remained a starter for the first third of the season before losing his spot and seeing a dramatic decrease in playing time for the remainder of the season. He was given a starting opportunity against Stade Lavallois, where he scored in a 2–1 defeat. He then started and scored in the following match, a 4–2 win against Quevilly-Rouen. Chambost continued as a starter for the last two games of the season.

Chambost scored his first goal of the 2023–24 season on 28 August versus Annecy, and would miss the following two matches due to injury. On 20 December 2023, he scored two goals in the first 10 minutes of the match in the 3–2 victory versus Bastia.

=== Columbus Crew ===
On 11 June 2024, it was announced that the Columbus Crew of Major League Soccer had acquired Chambost from Saint-Étienne. He signed a contract through the 2026 season, with a club option for a further season. On 9 August, he debuted for Columbus in the Leagues Cup against Sporting Kansas City, Chambost scored the final goal in a 4–0 win for his new side. Chambost made his league debut on 28 August, a start against Philadelphia Union that ended in a 1–0 win.

On 23 April 2026, it was announced that Chambost signed a contract to stay in Columbus until 2029. On 24 October 2026, Chambost notched three assists in a 4–2 match win at home to Toronto FC.

== Style of play ==
Described as a "technical player with great vision" by former manager Laurent Batlles, Chambost also highlighted this aspect of his game, stating: "I consider vision of the game one of my qualities: looking for free spaces to put my teammates in the best conditions."

== Personal life ==
He is a fan of Bernardo Silva.

== Career statistics ==
As of match played 13 November 2025

Appearances and goals by club, season, and competition
Club	Season	League			National cup		Continental		Other		Total	
Club	Season	Division	Apps	Goals	Apps	Goals	Apps	Goals	Apps	Goals	Apps	Goals
Saint-Étienne B	2016–17	Championnat de France Amateur 2	24	4	—		—		—		24	4
Saint-Étienne B	2017–18	Championnat National 3	25	12	—		—		—		25	12
Saint-Étienne B	2018–19	Championnat National 2	25	4	—		—		—		25	4
Saint-Étienne B	Total		74	20	—		—		—		74	20
Saint-Étienne	2017–18	Ligue 1	0	0	1	0	0	0	—		1	0
Saint-Étienne	2018–19	Ligue 1	0	0	1	0	0	0	—		1	0
Saint-Étienne	Total		0	0	2	0	0	0	—		2	0
Troyes	2019–20	Ligue 2	15	1	1	0	—		1 (Note: Appearance in the Coupe de la Ligue)	0	17	1
Troyes	2020–21	Ligue 2	36	1	0	0	—		—		36	1
Troyes	2021–22	Ligue 1	19	0	1	0	—		—		20	0
Troyes	Total		70	2	2	0	—		1	0	73	2
Troyes B	2021–22	Championnat National 3	2	0	—		—		—		2	0
Saint-Étienne	2022–23	Ligue 2	28	3	1	0	—		—		29	3
Saint-Étienne	2023–24	Ligue 2	33	6	2	0	—		3 (Note: One appearance in the Ligue 2 promotion play-offs, two appearances in the Ligue 1 relegation/promotion play-offs)	0	38	6
Saint-Étienne	Total		61	9	3	0	—		3	0	67	9
Columbus Crew	2024	Major League Soccer	10	0	—		—		5 (Note: Three appearances and one goal in the Leagues Cup, two appearances in the MLS Cup playoffs)	1	15	1
Columbus Crew	2025	Major League Soccer	34	1	—		2	0	6 (Note: Three appearances in the Leagues Cup, three appearances and one goal in the MLS Cup playoffs)	1	42	2
Columbus Crew	Total		44	1	—		2	0	11	2	57	3
Career total			251	32	7	0	2	0	15	2	275	34

== Honours ==
Troyes

- Ligue 2: 2020–21

Columbus Crew

- Leagues Cup: 2024
