= Dennis Appiah =

French footballer (born 1992)

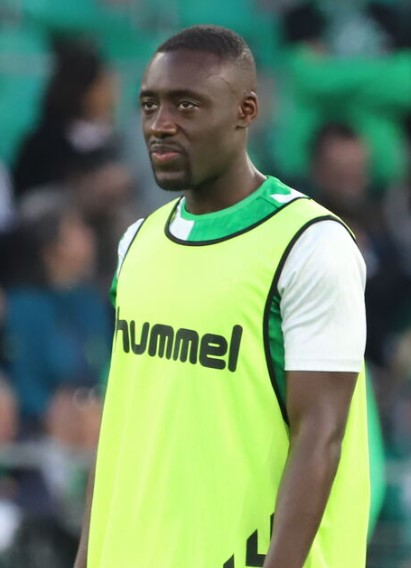
- Appiah with Saint-Étienne in 2024

Personal information
- Date of birth: 9 June 1992 (age 34)
- Place of birth: Toulouse, France
- Height: 1.79 m (5 ft 10 in)
- Positions: Defensive midfielder; centre-back

Team information
- Current team: Caen
- Number: 12

Youth career
- 1999–2004: Toulouse Pradettes
- 2004–2007: Toulouse Fontaines
- 2007–2011: Monaco

Senior career*
Years	Team	Apps	(Gls)
2010–2013	Monaco B	41	(0)
2010–2013	Monaco	23	(0)
2013–2016	Caen	103	(1)
2014	Caen B	3	(0)
2016–2019	Anderlecht	63	(0)
2019–2023	Nantes	88	(0)
2023–2026	Saint-Étienne	98	(0)
2026–	Caen	0	(0)

International career
2007–2008	France U16	7	(1)
2008–2009	France U17	18	(0)
2009–2010	France U18	10	(0)
2010–2011	France U19	14	(0)
2011–2012	France U20	2	(0)
- * Club domestic league appearances and goals as of 11 May 2026

Dennis Appiah (/ˈæpiɑː/ AP-ee-ah; born 9 June 1992) is a French professional footballer who plays for Ligue 3 club Caen. He was a France youth international, having earned caps at under-16, under-17, and under-18 level. Appiah played as a defensive midfielder. For both Nantes and Saint-Étienne, he's been playing in defence as a full-back and a centre-back in a back three.

== Career ==
On 19 May 2010, Appiah signed his first professional contract agreeing to a three-year deal. He made his professional debut on 1 August 2011 in a league match against Boulogne. He played the entire match, which ended 0–0.

On 3 January 2023, Appiah signed for Ligue 2 club Saint-Étienne on a two-and-a-half-year contract.

== Career statistics ==
As of match played 2 June 2024

Appearances and goals by club, season and competition
Club	Season	League			National cup		League cup		Europe		Other		Total	
Club	Season	Division	Apps	Goals	Apps	Goals	Apps	Goals	Apps	Goals	Apps	Goals	Apps	Goals
Monaco B	2010–11	CFA	20	0	—		—		—		—		20	0
Monaco B	2011–12	CFA	2	0	—		—		—		—		2	0
Monaco B	2012–13	CFA	19	0	—		—		—		—		19	0
Monaco B	Total		41	0	—		—		—		—		41	0
Monaco	2011–12	Ligue 2	17	0	1	0	0	0	—		—		18	0
Monaco	2012–13	Ligue 2	6	0	1	0	1	0	—		—		8	0
Monaco	Total		23	0	2	0	1	0	—		—		26	0
Caen	2013–14	Ligue 2	35	0	4	0	1	0	—		—		40	0
Caen	2014–15	Ligue 1	30	0	1	0	2	0	—		—		33	0
Caen	2015–16	Ligue 1	38	1	1	0	1	0	—		—		40	1
Caen	Total		103	1	6	0	4	0	—		—		113	1
Caen B	2014–15	CFA 2	3	0	—		—		—		—		3	0
Anderlecht	2016–17	First Division A	17	0	0	0	—		7 (Note: Two appearances in the UEFA Champions League and five in the UEFA Europa League)	0	9 (Note: Appearances in the Belgian First Division A playoffs)	0	24	0
Anderlecht	2017–18	First Division A	27	0	2	0	—		6 (Note: Appearances in the UEFA Champions League)	0	1 (Note: Appearance in the Belgian Super Cup)	0	36	0
Anderlecht	2018–19	First Division A	19	0	0	0	—		2 (Note: Appearances in the UEFA Europa League)	0	8	0	21	0
Anderlecht	Total		63	0	2	0	—		15	0	18	0	98	0
Nantes	2019–20	Ligue 1	19	0	2	0	1	0	—		—		22	0
Nantes	2020–21	Ligue 1	22	0	1	0	—		—		2 (Note: Appearances in the Ligue 1 relegation/promotion play-offs)	0	25	0
Nantes	2021–22	Ligue 1	32	0	5	0	—		—		—		37	0
Nantes	2022–23	Ligue 1	15	0	0	0	—		6	0	1 (Note: One appearance in Trophée des Champions)	0	22	0
Nantes	Total		88	0	8	0	1	0	6	0	3	0	106	0
Saint-Étienne	2022–23	Ligue 2	19	0	0	0	—		—		—		19	0
Saint-Étienne	2023–24	Ligue 2	33	0	0	0	—		—		3 (Note: One appearance in the Ligue 2 promotion play-offs, two appearances in the Ligue 1 relegation/promotion play-offs)	0	36	0
Saint-Étienne	Total		52	0	0	0	—		—		3	0	55	0
Career total			373	1	18	0	6	0	21	0	24	0	442	1

== Honours ==
Anderlecht

- Belgian Super Cup: 2017

Nantes

- Coupe de France: 2021–22
