= Yvann Maçon =

Footballer (born 1998)

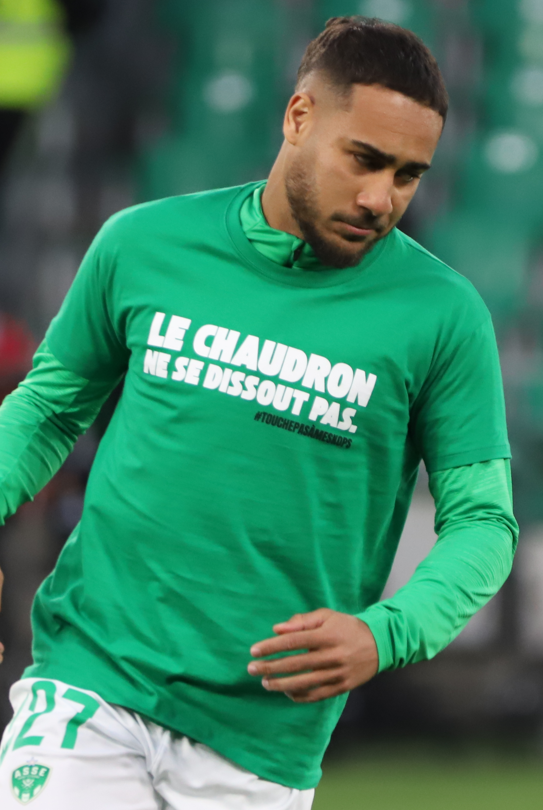
- Maçon with Saint-Étienne in 2025

Personal information
- Date of birth: 1 October 1998 (age 28)
- Place of birth: Baie-Mahault, Guadeloupe, France
- Height: 1.76 m (5 ft 9 in)
- Position: Right-back

Team information
- Current team: Grenoble
- Number: 97

Youth career
- 2004–2009: Association Juvenis
- 2009–2014: Solidarité Scolaire
- 2014–2017: Castelnau Le Crès

Senior career*
Years	Team	Apps	(Gls)
2017–2019	Dunkerque B	30	(2)
2018–2020	Dunkerque	20	(2)
2020–2026	Saint-Étienne	74	(5)
2022–2023	→ Paris FC (loan)	18	(0)
2023	→ Maccabi Tel Aviv (loan)	5	(0)
2025–2026	Saint-Étienne B	3	(0)
2026	AEL	18	(1)
2026–	Grenoble	0	(0)

International career^{‡}
2016	Guadeloupe U20	3	(3)
2020	France U21	2	(0)
2025–	Guadeloupe	3	(0)
- * Club domestic league appearances and goals as of 4 September 2026 ‡ National team caps and goals as of 25 June 2025

Yvann Maçon (born 1 October 1998) is a professional footballer who plays as a right-back for Ligue 2 club Grenoble. Born in Guadeloupe, he has represented both Guadeloupe and France at youth level.

== Club career ==
=== Dunkerque ===
Maçon was born in Baie-Mahault on Guadeloupe, and began his senior career with Dunkerque in the Championnat National. In the 2019–20 season, he made his breakthrough and was part of the team winning promotion to the Ligue 2.

=== Saint-Étienne ===
On 31 January 2020, Maçon signed a professional contract with Saint-Étienne. He made his professional debut for the club in a 1–0 Ligue 1 loss to Montpellier on 9 February 2020.

Maçon began making an impact at the start of the 2020–21 season, particularly on 27 September 2020 against Marseille, providing the assist for the first goal and impressing with his defensive efforts, in what was Saint-Étienne's first victory in Marseille since 1979. On 20 September, the week prior, Maçon had scored his first goal for Saint-Étienne against Nantes in a 2–2 draw. He suffered a posterior cruciate ligament injury on 12 October in a match against Slovakia for France U21, which effectively ruled him out for the remainder of the season.

Maçon returned to action on the first matchday of the 2021–22 season, starting at right-back in a 1–1 draw against Lorient.

==== Loan to Paris FC ====
On 8 December 2022, Maçon signed for Paris FC on loan until the end of the 2022–23 season.

==== Loan to Maccabi Tel Aviv ====
On 2 July 2023, Maçon signed for Maccabi Tel Aviv on loan until the end of the 2023–24 season with an option to make the move permanent.

=== AEL ===
On 5 January 2026, Maçon joined AEL in Greece.

== International career ==
Maçon played for the Guadeloupe U20 for 2017 CONCACAF U-20 Championship qualifying in 2016, scoring a hattrick in his last game with them.

He made his debut for the France U21 team on 8 October 2020 against Liechtenstein.

== Career statistics ==
As of match played 10 January 2026

Appearances and goals by club, season and competition
Club	Season	League			National cup (Note: Includes Coupe de France)		League cup (Note: Includes Toto Cup)		Europe		Other		Total	
Club	Season	Division	Apps	Goals	Apps	Goals	Apps	Goals	Apps	Goals	Apps	Goals	Apps	Goals
Dunkerque B	2017–18	National 3	20	1	—		—		—		—		20	1
Dunkerque B	2018–19	National 3	10	1	—		—		—		—		10	1
Dunkerque B	Total		30	3	—		—		—		—		30	2
Dunkerque	2017–18	National	1	0	0	0	—		—		—		1	0
Dunkerque	2018–19	National	1	0	0	0	—		—		—		1	0
Dunkerque	2019–20	National	18	0	1	0	—		—		—		19	0
Dunkerque	Total		20	0	1	0	—		—		—		21	0
Saint-Étienne	2019–20	Ligue 1	2	0	1	0	—		—		0	0	3	0
Saint-Étienne	2020–21	Ligue 1	6	1	0	0	—		—		—		6	1
Saint-Étienne	2021–22	Ligue 1	22	0	3	0	—		—		1 (Note: Appearance(s) in Ligue 1 relegation/promotion play-offs)	0	26	0
Saint-Étienne	2022–23	Ligue 2	12	3	1	0	—		—		—		13	3
Saint-Étienne	2023–24	Ligue 2	18	1	0	0	—		—		3	0	21	1
Saint-Étienne	2024–25	Ligue 1	12	0	0	0	—		—		—		12	0
Saint-Étienne	2025–26	Ligue 2	2	0	2	0	—		—		—		4	0
Saint-Étienne	Total		74	5	7	0	—		—		4	0	85	5
Paris FC (loan)	2022–23	Ligue 2	18	0	1	0	—		—		—		19	0
Maccabi Tel Aviv (loan)	2023–24	Israeli Premier League	5	0	0	0	1	0	8 (Note: Appearances in UEFA Europa Conference League)	1	—		14	1
Saint-Étienne B	2024–25	National 3	1	0	—		—		—		—		1	0
Saint-Étienne B	2025–26	National 3	2	0	—		—		—		—		2	0
Saint-Étienne B	Total		3	0	—		—		—		—		3	0
AEL (loan)	2025–26	Super League Greece	5	0	0	0	—		—		—		5	0
Career total			156	8	9	0	1	0	8	1	4	0	178	9

== Honours ==
Saint-Étienne

- Coupe de France runner-up: 2019–20
