= Niels Nkounkou =

French footballer (born 2000)

Personal information
- Full name: Niels Patrick Nkounkou
- Date of birth: 1 November 2000 (age 26)
- Place of birth: Pontoise, France
- Height: 1.84 m (6 ft 0 in)
- Position: Left-back

Team information
- Current team: Nice (on loan from Eintracht Frankfurt)
- Number: 27

Youth career
- 2006–2015: Cergy Pontoise
- 2015–2016: Rouen
- 2016: Cergy Pontoise
- 2016–2017: Entente SSG
- 2017: Brest
- 2017–2019: Marseille

Senior career*
Years	Team	Apps	(Gls)
2017–2020	Marseille B	43	(4)
2020–2023	Everton	2	(0)
2021–2022	→ Standard Liège (loan)	23	(0)
2022–2023	→ Cardiff City (loan)	18	(0)
2023	→ Saint-Étienne (loan)	20	(6)
2023	Saint-Étienne	1	(0)
2023–	Eintracht Frankfurt	41	(3)
2025–2026	→ Torino (loan)	11	(0)
2026–	→ Nice (loan)	5	(0)

International career^{‡}
2018	France U18	1	(0)
2018	France U19	2	(0)
2023	France U21	6	(0)
2021	France Olympic	1	(0)
- * Club domestic league appearances and goals as of 18 October 2026 ‡ National team caps and goals as of 22:43, 28 March 2023 (UTC)

Niels Patrick Nkounkou (born 1 November 2000) is a French professional footballer who plays as a left-back for Ligue 1 club Nice, on loan from Bundesliga club Eintracht Frankfurt. He made his international debut for the France Olympic team at Tokyo 2020.

== Club career ==
=== Early career ===
Nkounkou started his career with Cergy Pontoise, coming through the club's youth ranks. He signed for Ligue 1 giants Marseille in 2017. As a promising youngster, Nkounkou played regularly for Marseille's B team, routinely training with the senior side and featuring on the bench twice for the first team during the 2019–20 season.

=== Everton ===
Nkounkou joined Everton on a free transfer in July 2020, signing a three-year deal, after rejecting a professional contract from Marseille due to the sporting plan proposed by the French club wasn't convincing for the defender and his future development. The opportunity of working under Carlo Ancelotti convinced Nkounkou to join the Toffees. Nkounkou's agent Yvan Le Mée stressed that Ancelotti called the player, spoke to him, and knew the player's potential. By working with the player, Ancelotti can make him a top player.

Nkounkou made his professional debut for Everton in a 3–0 EFL Cup victory against Salford City in which he impressed immensely, forming an effective attacking partnership down the left hand side of the pitch with fellow youngster Anthony Gordon. He put in another positive display in his second match, also in the EFL Cup, against Fleetwood Town which he capped with a back-heeled assist to set up a goal for Moise Kean in a 5–2 victory.

Nkounkou played his first league game for Everton on 1 November 2020 against Newcastle United, a game Everton lost 2–1. He replaced teammate Lucas Digne who was serving a one match ban. He made his second league appearance in the last day of the season when Everton suffered a 5–0 defeat to Manchester City on 23 May 2021.

=== Saint-Étienne ===
In January 2023, Nkounkou signed for Ligue 2 club Saint-Étienne on loan. The deal was eventually made permanent.

=== Eintracht Frankfurt ===
On 1 September 2023, Nkounkou signed a five-year contract with Bundesliga club Eintracht Frankfurt. He scored on his debut for the club, coming off the bench to net an 87th minute equaliser in a 1–1 draw vs Koln.

==== Loan to Torino ====
On 1 September 2025, Nkounkou moved on loan to Torino in Italy, with an option to buy and a conditional obligation to buy.

== International career ==
Born in France, Nkounkou is of Republic of Congo descent. He has represented France and has been capped twice for the country's U19 side. In July 2021, Nkounkou received a call up to the France Olympics squad, who will face Japan, South Africa and Mexico in Group A of the tournament. He subsequently made his debut for France U23 when they played South Africa in the second tournament match on 25 July 2021.

== Style of play ==
Upon the signing of Nkounkou, Everton Director of Football Marcel Brands said "Niels is a young, talented player with good technical and physical skills." Jeremy Smith, a French football writer and podcaster at French Football Weekly, believed that “Nkounkou is a well-regarded young left-back who can also play further up the left flank is a little like a Benjamin Mendy in that he is strong, has a great engine and can patrol the whole flank all match and has a decent shot and cross on him too.”

== Career statistics ==
As of match played 18 October 2026

Appearances and goals by club, season and competition
Club	Season	League			National cup (Note: Includes FA Cup, Belgian Cup, DFB-Pokal)		League cup (Note: Includes EFL Cup)		Europe		Total	
Club	Season	Division	Apps	Goals	Apps	Goals	Apps	Goals	Apps	Goals	Apps	Goals
Marseille B	2017–18	Championnat National 2	8	2	—		—		—		8	2
Marseille B	2018–19	Championnat National 2	21	1	—		—		—		21	1
Marseille B	2019–20	Championnat National 2	14	1	—		—		—		14	1
Marseille B	Total		43	4	—		—		—		43	4
Everton	2020–21	Premier League	2	0	1	0	3	0	—		6	0
Everton	2021–22	Premier League	0	0	0	0	1	0	—		1	0
Everton	Total		2	0	1	0	4	0	—		7	0
Standard Liège (loan)	2021–22	Belgian First Division A	23	0	2	0	—		—		25	0
Cardiff City (loan)	2022–23	Championship	18	0	0	0	0	0	—		18	0
Saint-Étienne (loan)	2022–23	Ligue 2	20	6	0	0	—		—		20	6
Saint-Étienne	2023–24	Ligue 2	1	0	0	0	—		—		1	0
Saint-Étienne	Total		21	6	0	0	—		—		21	6
Eintracht Frankfurt	2023–24	Bundesliga	29	3	2	0	—		8 (Note: Appearances in UEFA Europa Conference League)	0	39	3
Eintracht Frankfurt	2024–25	Bundesliga	12	0	3	0	—		8 (Note: Appearances in UEFA Europa League)	0	23	0
Eintracht Frankfurt	2025–26	Bundesliga	0	0	1	0	—		0	0	1	0
Eintracht Frankfurt	2026–27	Bundesliga	0	0	1	0	—		0	0	1	0
Eintracht Frankfurt	Total		41	3	6	0	—		16	0	63	3
Torino (loan)	2025–26	Serie A	11	0	2	0	—		—		13	0
Nice	2026–27	Ligue 1	5	0	0	0	—		—		5	0
Career total			164	13	11	0	4	0	16	0	195	13

== Honours ==
Individual

- UNFP Ligue 2 Team of the Year: 2022–23
