= Léo Pétrot =

French footballer (born 1997)

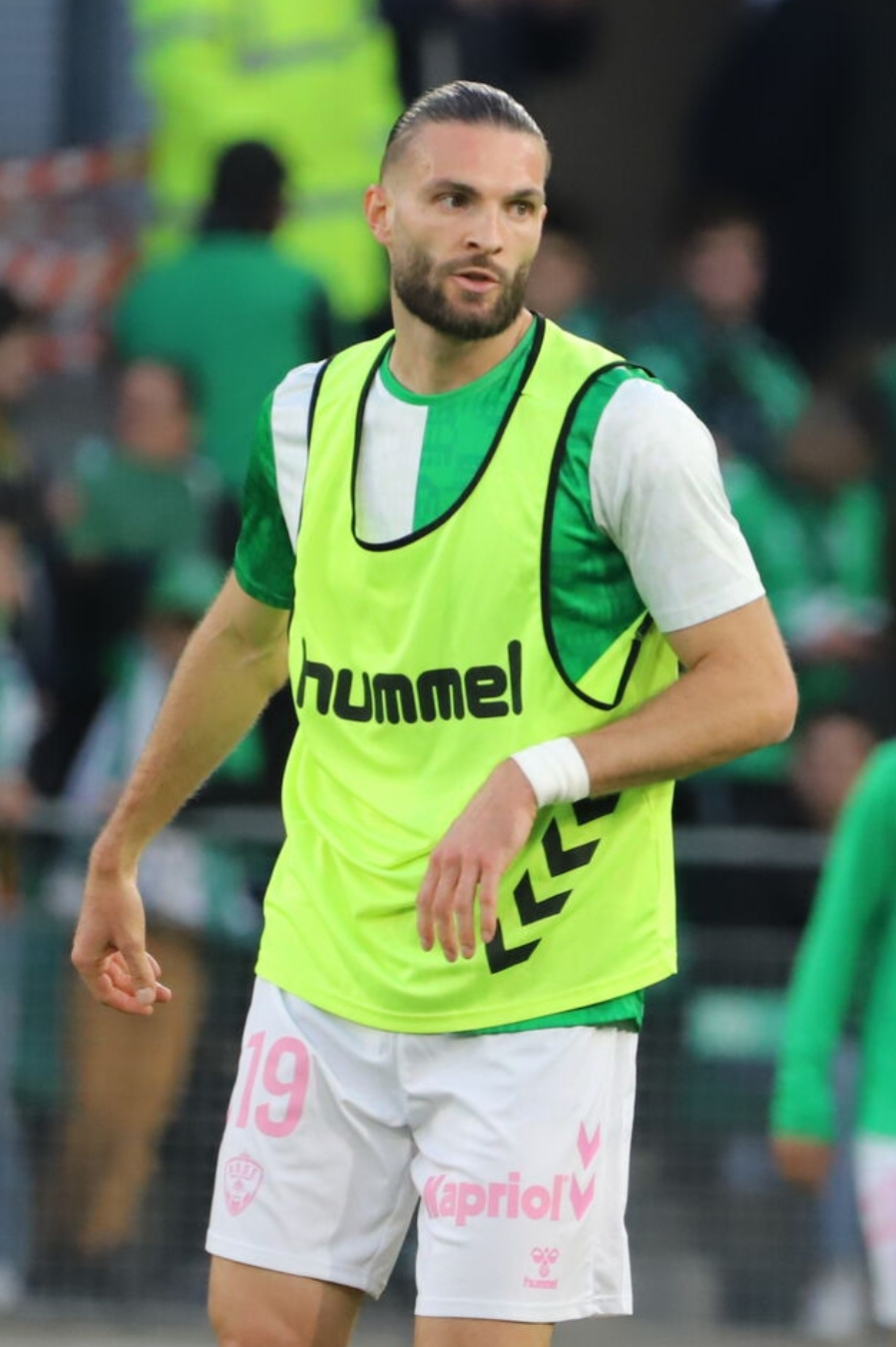
- Pétrot with Saint-Étienne in 2024

Personal information
- Date of birth: 15 April 1997 (age 29)
- Place of birth: Firminy, France
- Height: 1.88 m (6 ft 2 in)
- Position: Left-back

Team information
- Current team: Anderlecht
- Number: 27

Youth career
- US Monistrol
- 2011–2012: Olympique Saint-Etienne
- 2012–2014: Saint-Étienne

Senior career*
Years	Team	Apps	(Gls)
2014–2019	Saint-Étienne B	87	(2)
2019–2021	Andrézieux	22	(1)
2021	Lorient B	4	(0)
2021–2022	Lorient	22	(1)
2022–2025	Saint-Étienne	95	(2)
2024	Saint-Étienne B	1	(0)
2025–2026	Elche	32	(0)
2026–	Anderlecht	9	(0)
- * Club domestic league appearances and goals as of 25 October 2026

Léo Pétrot (born 15 April 1997) is a French professional footballer who plays as a left-back for Belgian Pro League club Anderlecht.

== Career ==
A youth product of US Monistrol, Olympique Saint-Etienne, and Saint-Étienne, Pétrot began his senior career with the reserves of Saint-Étienne. He thereafter moved to the senior team of Andrézieux. On 16 July 2021, he signed a professional contract with FC Lorient. He made his professional debut with Lorient in a 2–2 Ligue 1 tie with RC Lens on 29 August 2021.

On 30 August 2022, Pétrot returned to his youth club Saint-Étienne and signed a three-year contract. On 11 July 2025, he joined La Liga side Elche on a one-year deal.

On 2 July 2026, Pétrot signed a two-season contract with Anderlecht in Belgium.

== Career statistics ==
As of match played 25 October 2026

Appearances and goals by club, season and competition
Club	Season	League			National cup (Note: Includes Coupe de France, Copa del Rey)		Europe		Other		Total	
Club	Season	Division	Apps	Goals	Apps	Goals	Apps	Goals	Apps	Goals	Apps	Goals
Saint-Étienne B	2015–16	CFA	9	0	—		—		—		9	0
Saint-Étienne B	2016–17	CFA	26	0	—		—		—		26	0
Saint-Étienne B	2017–18	CFA 2	25	1	—		—		—		25	1
Saint-Étienne B	2018–19	CFA	27	1	—		—		—		27	1
Saint-Étienne B	Total		87	2	—		—		—		87	2
Andrézieux	2019–20	CFA	13	0	—		—		—		13	0
Andrézieux	2020–21	CFA	9	1	2	0	—		—		11	1
Andrézieux	Total		22	1	2	0	—		—		24	1
Lorient B	2021–22	CFA	4	0	—		—		—		4	0
Lorient	2021–22	Ligue 1	22	1	1	0	—		—		23	1
Saint-Étienne	2022–23	Ligue 2	29	1	1	0	—		—		30	1
Saint-Étienne	2023–24	Ligue 2	35	1	0	0	—		3 (Note: Appearances in Ligue 1 relegation/promotion play-offs)	1	38	2
Saint-Étienne	2024–25	Ligue 1	31	0	0	0	—		—		31	0
Saint-Étienne	Total		95	2	1	0	—		3	1	99	3
Saint-Étienne B	2024–25	CFA 2	1	0	—		—		—		1	0
Elche	2025–26	La Liga	32	0	4	1	—		—		36	1
Anderlecht	2026–27	Belgian Pro League	9	0	1	0	9 (Note: Appearances in UEFA Europa League)	1	—		19	1
Career total			272	6	9	1	9	1	3	1	293	9
