= Antoine Gauthier =

French footballer (born 2004)

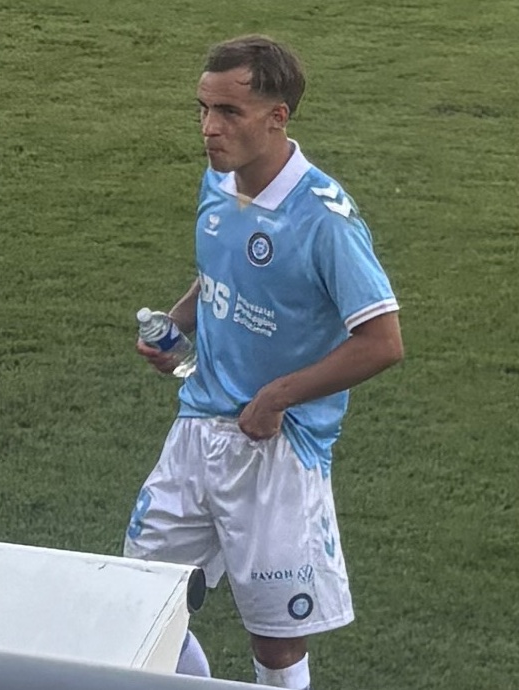
- Gauthier with Le Puy-en-Velay in 2026

Personal information
- Date of birth: 1 July 2004 (age 22)
- Place of birth: Clermont-Ferrand, France
- Position: Attacking midfielder

Team information
- Current team: Le Puy
- Number: 18

Youth career
- –2022: Saint-Étienne

Senior career*
Years	Team	Apps	(Gls)
2022–2025	Saint-Étienne B	55	(6)
2022–2023	Saint-Étienne	2	(0)
2025–	Le Puy	18	(0)
- * Club domestic league appearances and goals as of 23 June 2026

Antoine Gauthier (born 1 July 2004) is a French professional footballer who plays as an attacking midfielder for Ligue 3 club Le Puy.

== Career ==
During the preseason leading up to the 2022–23 season, Gauthier was among the Saint-Étienne youth players most involved in the first team's preparation, and he notably registered an assist during a 1–1 friendly draw against Grenoble. Under manager Laurent Batlles, he made his professional debut as a late-match substitute in a 5–0 Ligue 2 win over Bastia on 30 August 2022. Eight days later on 7 September, Gauthier signed his first professional contract with Saint-Étienne, a deal lasting until June 2025.

On 4 June 2025, Gauthier signed for Championnat National club Le Puy.

== Style of play ==
Gauthier has previously been described as one of Saint-Étienne's "most hopeful" youth prospects. A left-footed attacking midfielder, he is seen as a player who "reads the game well" and who "distributes the ball" with quick decision-making. Gauthier is adept at set pieces, and is able to register many assists thanks to his proficiency in the domain.
