= Abdoulaye Bakayoko =

Ivorian footballer (born 2002)

Personal information
- Date of birth: 15 December 2002 (age 23)
- Place of birth: Agou, Ivory Coast
- Height: 1.85 m (6 ft 1 in)
- Position: Centre-back

Team information
- Current team: Al-Waab
- Number: 26

Youth career
- CFF Paris
- 2018–2020: Saint-Étienne

Senior career*
Years	Team	Apps	(Gls)
2020–2023	Saint-Étienne B	16	(1)
2022–2023	Saint-Étienne	13	(0)
2023	→ Le Puy (loan)	1	(0)
2023–2024	Muaither	4	(0)
2024–	Al-Waab	0	(0)
- * Club domestic league appearances and goals as of 10:49, 4 November 2023 (UTC)

Abdoulaye Bakayoko (born 15 December 2002) is an Ivorian professional footballer who plays as a centre-back for Qatari club Al-Waab.

== Career ==
Bakayoko is a youth product of Saint-Étienne, and signed his first professional contract with the club on 28 May 2021. He made his professional debut with Saint-Étienne in a 2–1 Ligue 1 loss to Lens on 15 January 2022.

On 28 January 2023, Bakayoko was loaned by Le Puy in Championnat National.

In September 2023, Bakayoko signed for Qatar Stars League club Muaither.
