= Karim Cissé =

Guinean footballer (born 2004)

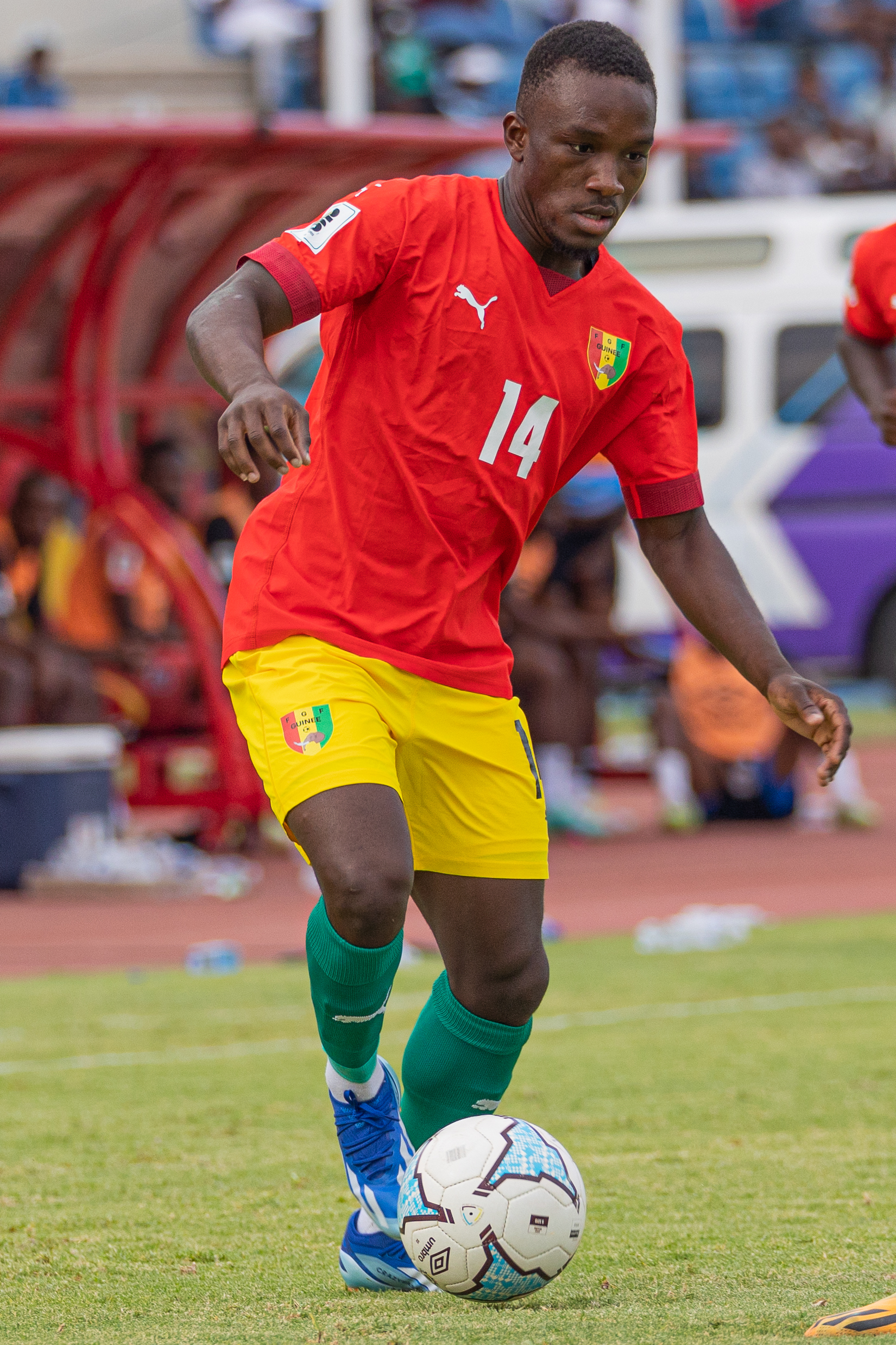
- Cissé with Guinea in 2023

Personal information
- Date of birth: 14 November 2004 (age 21)
- Place of birth: Conakry, Guinea
- Height: 1.75 m (5 ft 9 in)
- Position: Forward

Team information
- Current team: Aubagne Air Bel
- Number: 10

Youth career
- AS Aborra
- Académie Falcao
- Lyon Croix Rousse
- Lyon La Duchère

Senior career*
| Years | Team | Apps | (Gls) |
| 2020–2026 | Saint-Étienne B | 33 | (8) |
| 2023–2026 | Saint-Étienne | 8 | (0) |
| 2024–2025 | → Annecy (loan) | 12 | (1) |
| 2026– | Aubagne Air Bel | 5 | (0) |

International career^{‡}
| 2023– | Guinea | 2 | (0) |
- * Club domestic league appearances and goals as of 5 September 2026 ‡ National team caps and goals as of 01:57, 17 November 2023 (UTC)

Karim Cissé (born 14 November 2004) is a Guinean professional footballer who plays as a forward for Ligue 3 club Aubagne Air Bel.

== Club career ==
Born in Guinea, Cissé began playing football with the Guinean youth clubs AS Aborra and Falcao Academy. He moved to France and joined the youth academies of the Lyon-based clubs Lyon Croix Rousse and Lyon La Duchère, before moving to the reserves of Saint-Étienne during the COVID-19 pandemic in 2020. Originally assigned to their reserves, he signed his first professional contract with the club on 1 July 2023 until 2026. He made his professional debut with Saint-Étienne as a substitute in a 1–0 Ligue 2 loss to Grenoble on 5 August 2023.

== International career ==
In September 2020, Karim Cissé was first called with the Guinea national team by the coach Kaba Diawara. On 13 October 2023, Cissé honoured his first selection against Guinea-Bissau. He comes into play and contributes to his team's victory by delivering a decisive pass for Morgan Guilavogui on the goal of the game alone.

On 23 December 2023, he was selected from the list of 25 Guinean players selected by Kaba Diawara to compete in the 2023 Africa Cup of Nations.
