= Etienne Green =

English footballer (born 2000)

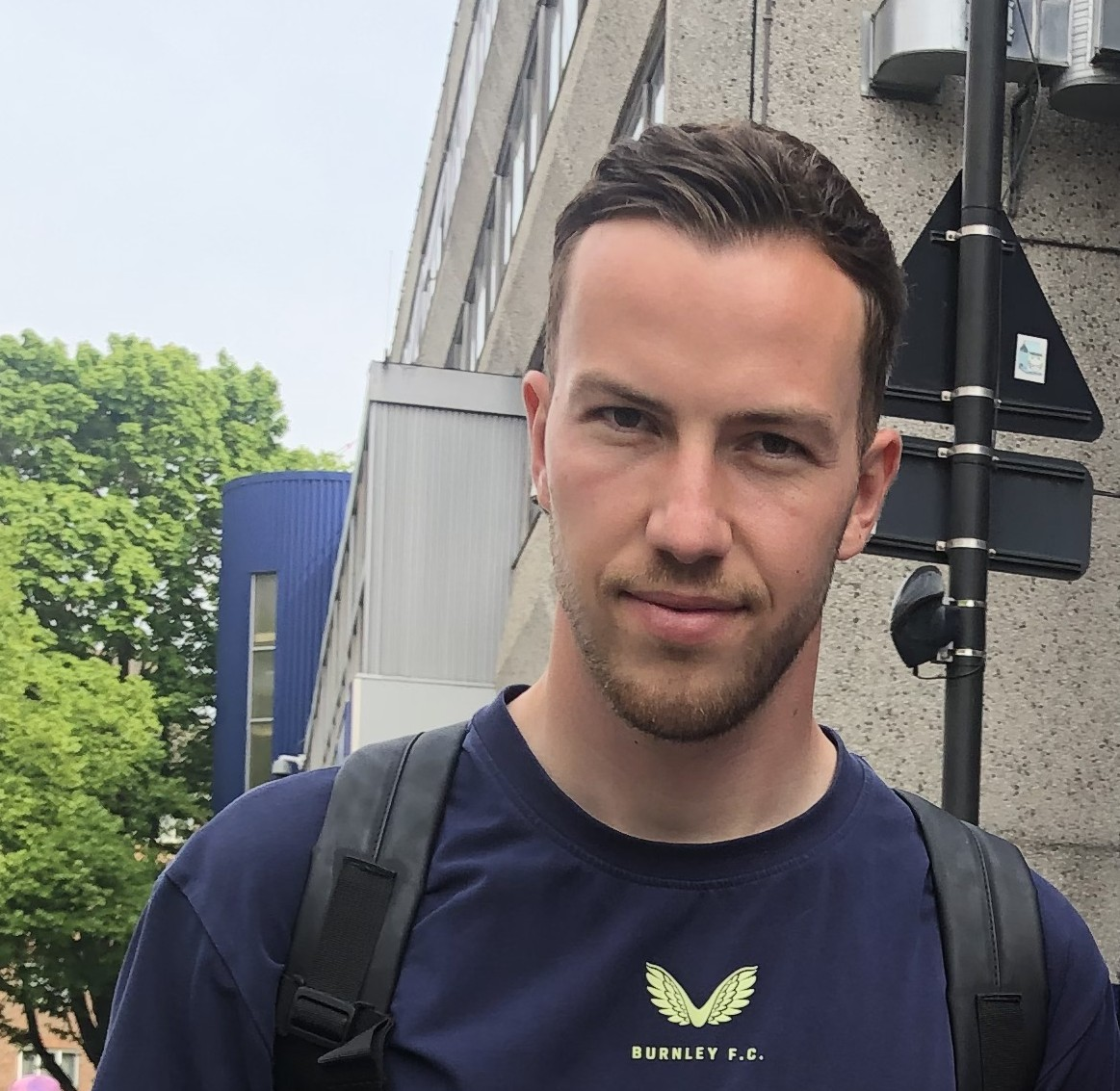
- Green with Burnley in 2025

Personal information
- Full name: Etienne Frederic Green
- Date of birth: 19 July 2000 (age 26)
- Place of birth: Colchester, England
- Height: 6 ft 4 in (1.92 m)
- Position: Goalkeeper

Youth career
- 2006–2009: ES Veauche
- 2009–2019: Saint-Étienne

Senior career*
Years	Team	Apps	(Gls)
2019–2024	Saint-Étienne B	6	(0)
2021–2024	Saint-Étienne	37	(0)
2024–2025	Burnley	0	(0)
2025–2026	Fredericia	4	(0)

International career
2021	England U21	2	(0)
- * Club domestic league appearances and goals as of 23:30, 13 September 2026 (UTC)

Etienne Frederic Green (born 19 July 2000) is an English professional footballer who last played as a goalkeeper for Danish Superliga club Fredericia.

== Club career ==
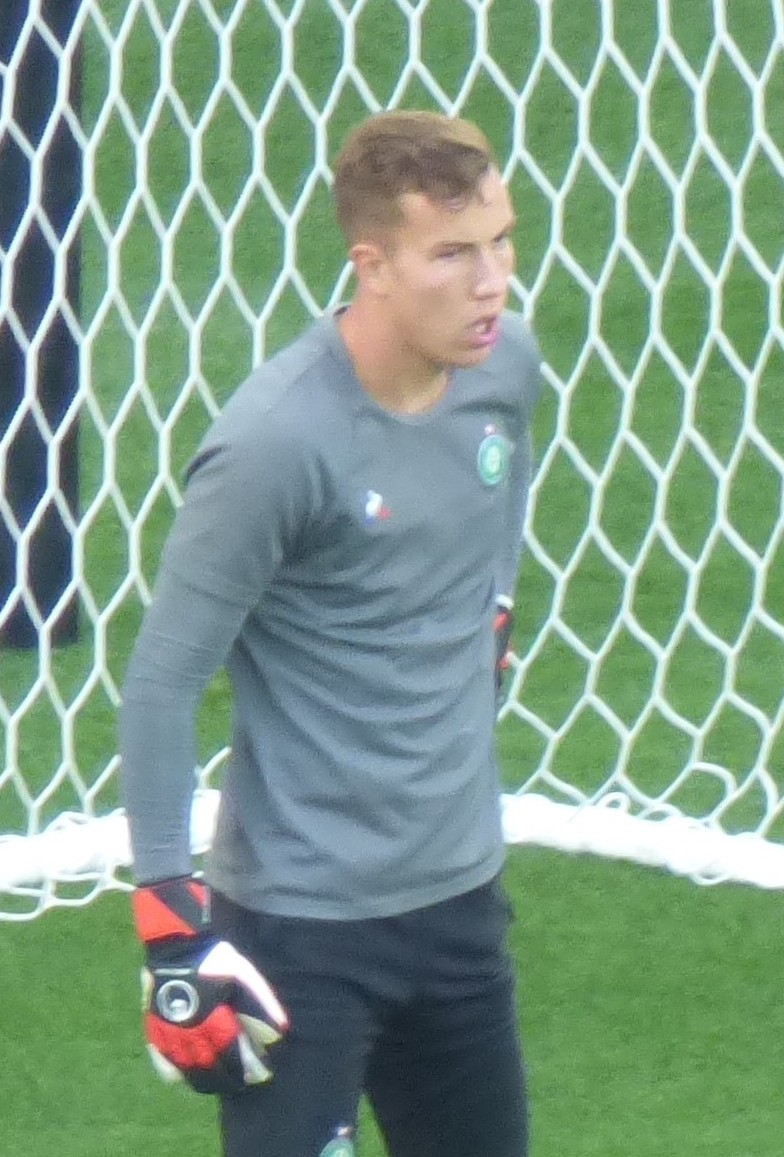
Green with Saint-Étienne in 2020

Born in England to an English father and French mother, Green moved to France at the age of four. After spending three years at ES Veauche, he joined youth academy of Saint-Étienne in 2009. He signed his first professional contract with the club in June 2020. Green made his professional debut on 4 April 2021 in a 2–0 league win against Nîmes, keeping a clean sheet and saving a penalty.

On 7 August 2024, Green signed for Championship side Burnley for an undisclosed fee, signing a three-year deal.

On 27 August 2025, Green signed for Danish Superliga side FC Fredericia, on a one-year contract. Green was released at the end of the season.

== International career ==
Born in England, Green has previously represented France at youth international level. On 24 May 2021, he received his first call-up to the France under-21 team for knockout stage of the 2021 UEFA European Under-21 Championship. He was initially not included in the squad, but was named as a replacement for Alban Lafont who had to pull out of the squad to play Ligue 1 relegation/promotion play-offs with his club Nantes.

On 23 August 2021, it was reported that Green would switch his international allegiance to England, and four days later he was included in Lee Carsley's first U21 squad. On 11 October 2021, he made his U21 debut during a 1–0 2023 UEFA European Under-21 Championship qualification win away to Andorra.

== Career statistics ==
As of match played 13 March 2026

Appearances and goals by club, season and competition
Club	Season	League			National cup (Note: Includes Danish Cup)		Total	
Club	Season	Division	Apps	Goals	Apps	Goals	Apps	Goals
Saint-Étienne B	2019–20	Championnat National 2	2	0	—		2	0
Saint-Étienne B	2020–21	Championnat National 3	1	0	—		1	0
Saint-Étienne B	2021–22	Championnat National 3	0	0	—		0	0
Saint-Étienne B	2022–23	Championnat National 3	1	0	—		1	0
Saint-Étienne B	2023–24	Championnat National 3	2	0	—		2	0
Saint-Étienne B	Total		6	0	—		6	0
Saint-Étienne	2020–21	Ligue 1	8	0	0	0	8	0
Saint-Étienne	2021–22	Ligue 1	15	0	0	0	15	0
Saint-Étienne	2022–23	Ligue 2	8	0	0	0	8	0
Saint-Étienne	2023–24	Ligue 2	6	0	0	0	6	0
Saint-Étienne	Total		37	0	0	0	37	0
Burnley	2024–25	Championship	0	0	0	0	0	0
Fredericia	2025–26	Danish Superliga	3	0	1	0	4	0
Career total			46	0	1	0	47	0
