= Bryan Nokoue =

Cameroonian footballer (born 2002)

Personal information
- Full name: Bryan Djile Nokoue
- Date of birth: 23 May 2002 (age 24)
- Place of birth: Yaoundé, Cameroon
- Height: 1.80 m (5 ft 11 in)
- Position: Defender

Team information
- Current team: Dubai City

Youth career
- –2018: Montrouge FC
- 2018–2021: Saint-Étienne

Senior career*
Years	Team	Apps	(Gls)
2018–2024	Saint-Étienne B	74	(0)
2021–2024	Saint-Étienne	2	(0)
2025	NK HAŠK		
2026–	Dubai City	1	(0)

International career^{‡}
2021	Cameroon U20	2	(0)
2023–	Cameroon U23	1	(0)
- * Club domestic league appearances and goals as of 20:45, 31 August 2024 (UTC) ‡ National team caps and goals as of 19:41, 1 April 2023 (UTC)

Bryan Djile Nokoue (born 23 May 2002) is a Cameroonian professional footballer who plays for Dubai City as a defender.

== Club career ==
Bryan Nokoue was born in Yaoundé, Cameroon, and came through the ranks of Montrouge FC in the Île-de-France before joining Saint-Étienne academy in 2018. In August 2021, as several other clubs where looking to attract the young footballer, he eventually signed his first professional contract with Saint-Étienne. He made his professional debut for Saint-Étienne on the 15 August 2021, replacing Yvan Neyou during a 2–2 Ligue 1 away draw against Lens.

== International career ==
Nokoue played for the Cameroon U23s for a set of 2023 U-23 Africa Cup of Nations qualification matches in March 2023.
