= Aïmen Moueffek =

Football player for Saint-Étienne (born in 2001)

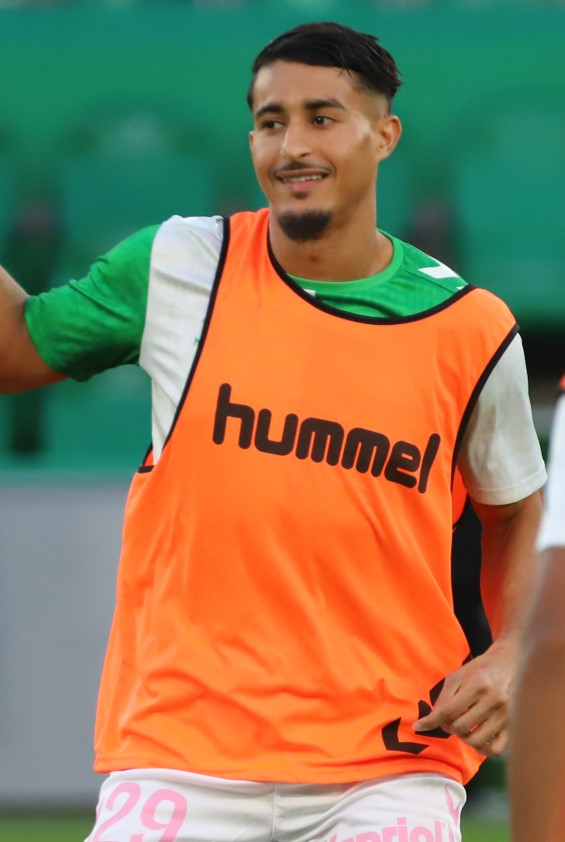
- Moueffek in 2024

Personal information
- Date of birth: 9 April 2001 (age 25)
- Place of birth: Vienne, France
- Height: 1.79 m (5 ft 10 in)
- Position: Midfielder

Team information
- Current team: Cádiz (on loan from Saint-Étienne)
- Number: 17

Youth career
- 2008–2010: ALSM
- 2010–2012: Cascol Football
- 2012–2020: Saint-Étienne

Senior career*
Years	Team	Apps	(Gls)
2019–2023	Saint-Étienne B	11	(0)
2020–	Saint-Étienne	141	(6)
2026–	→ Cádiz (loan)	0	(0)

International career^{‡}
2016–2017	France U16	5	(0)
2023–2025	Morocco U23	3	(0)
- * Club domestic league appearances and goals as of 11 May 2026 ‡ National team caps and goals as of 23:09, 25 November 2023 (UTC)

Aïmen Moueffek (born 9 April 2001) is a professional footballer who plays as a right-back for Segunda División club Cádiz, on loan from Ligue 2 club Saint-Étienne. Born in France, he is a youth international for Morocco.

== Club career ==
Born in Vienne, Isère, Moueffek first played in the Amicale Laïque de Saint-Maurice-L'Exil. He later joined the Cascol club from Oullins, before arriving in Saint-Étienne during the 2011–12 season. After winning the Coupe Gambardella in 2019, he signed his first professional contract in July of that year.

After some successful performances in the 2020 summer friendlies, Moueffek made his professional – and Ligue 1 – debut for Saint-Étienne on 17 September 2020, replacing injured Mathieu Debuchy in a 2–0 away win over Olympique de Marseille. On 27 May 2021, he renewed his link with the club until 2024.

Regularly used in the following years, Moueffek scored his first professional goal on 6 May 2023, netting the equalizer in a 3–2 Ligue 2 home win over EA Guingamp. On 4 July 2024, he further extended his contract until 2028.

On 31 August 2026, Moueffek moved to Spain after agreeing to a one-year loan deal with Segunda División side Cádiz.

== International career ==
Born in France to Moroccan parents, Moueffek holds French and Moroccan nationalities. He played for the France U16s in 2017. He decided to change his sporting nationality during 2023, changing from French to Moroccan. In October 2023, he was called up to the Morocco U23s for a set of friendlies.
