= Mathys Saban =

French footballer (born 2002)

Personal information
- Date of birth: 15 May 2002 (age 24)
- Place of birth: Paris, France
- Height: 1.77 m (5 ft 10 in)
- Position: Midfielder

Team information
- Current team: Racing Union
- Number: 19

Youth career
- 2011–2016: Torcy
- 2016–2021: Saint-Étienne

Senior career*
Years	Team	Apps	(Gls)
2019–2025	Saint-Étienne B	27	(5)
2021–2025	Saint-Étienne	7	(0)
2023–2024	→ UT Pétange (loan)	4	(0)
2025–	Racing Union	8	(1)
- * Club domestic league appearances and goals as of 20 October 2025

Mathys Saban (born 15 May 2002) is a French professional footballer who plays as a midfielder for Racing Union in Luxembourg.

== Career ==
A product of Torcy's youth academy, Saban joined the youth academy of Saint-Étienne in December 2016. On 5 June 2020, he signed his first professional contract keeping him at Saint-Étienne for three years. He made his professional debut with Saint-Étienne in a 1–0 Ligue 1 loss to Dijon on 23 May 2021, in the last game of the 2020–21 season.
