= Victor Lobry =

French footballer (born 1995)

Personal information
- Date of birth: 16 June 1995 (age 31)
- Place of birth: Soissons, France
- Height: 1.81 m (5 ft 11 in)
- Position: Midfielder

Team information
- Current team: Sochaux
- Number: 19

Youth career
- Villeneuve St Germain
- Reims

Senior career*
| Years | Team | Apps | (Gls) |
| 2013–2017 | Reims B | 54 | (8) |
| 2017–2018 | Limoges | 29 | (5) |
| 2018–2019 | Tours | 33 | (0) |
| 2019–2020 | Avranches | 23 | (1) |
| 2020–2022 | Pau | 74 | (8) |
| 2022–2024 | Saint-Étienne | 51 | (1) |
| 2024 | Guingamp | 18 | (0) |
| 2025–2026 | Amiens | 29 | (1) |
| 2026– | Sochaux | 0 | (0) |
- * Club domestic league appearances and goals as of 12 May 2026

Victor Lobry (born 16 June 1995) is a French professional footballer who plays as a midfielder for Ligue 2 club Sochaux.

== Career ==
A youth product of Reims, Lobry spent his early career in amateur leagues in France before signing with Pau on 13 June 2020. He made his professional debut with Pau in a 3–0 Ligue 2 loss to Valenciennes on 22 August 2020.

On 20 July 2022, Lobry signed a two-year contract with Saint-Étienne.

On 20 January 2024, Lobry moved to Guingamp until the end of the season.

On 20 January 2025, Lobry signed a one-and-a-half-year contract with Amiens.

On 16 June 2026, Lobry joined Sochaux in Ligue 2 on a two-year contract, with an optional third year.
