= El Hadji Dieye =

Senegalese footballer (born 2002)

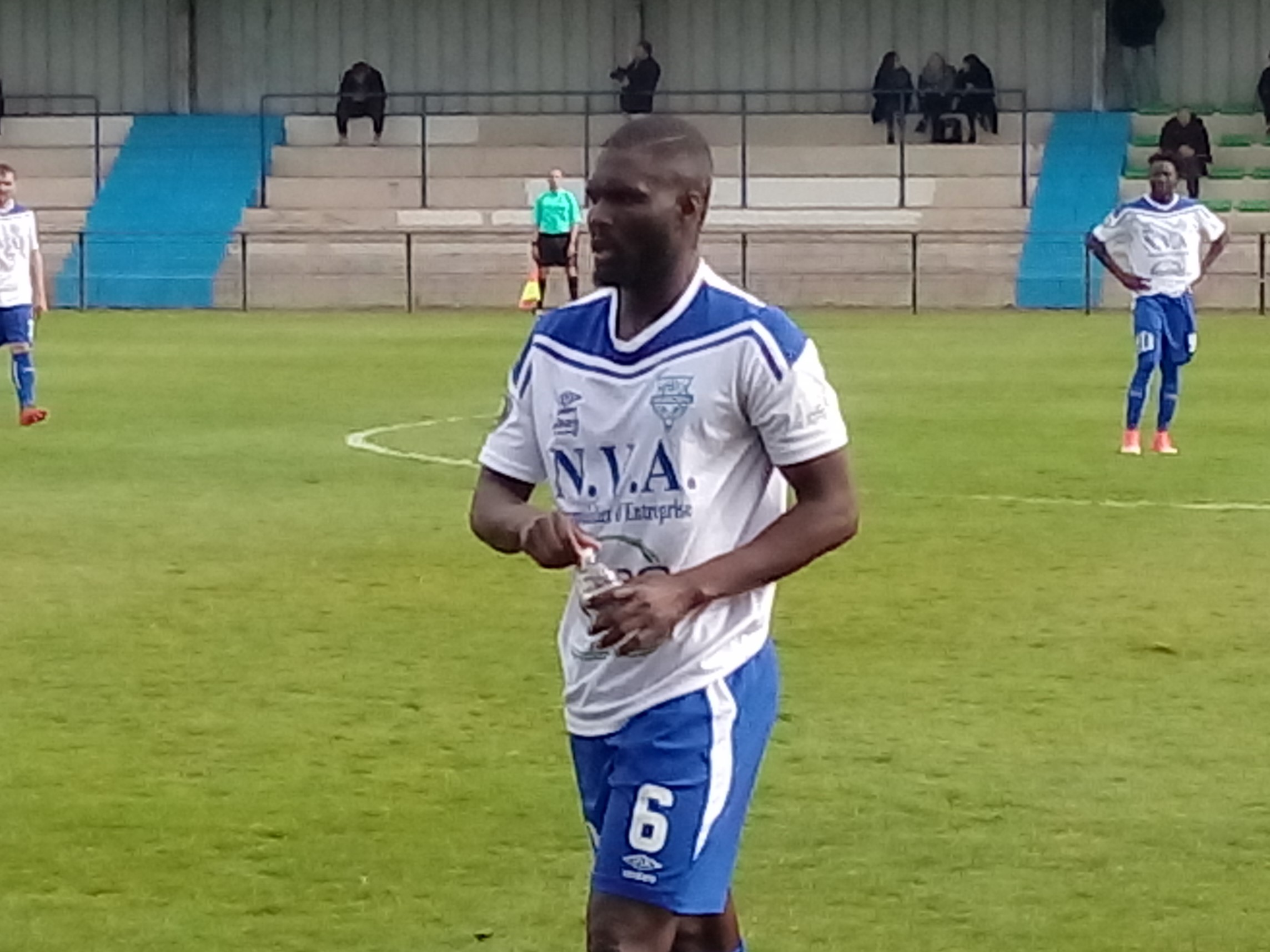

Personal information
- Date of birth: 1 January 2002 (age 24)
- Place of birth: Senegal
- Position: Winger

Team information
- Current team: Saint-Étienne B

Senior career*
Years	Team	Apps	(Gls)
2021–2025	Saint-Étienne B	57	(9)
2021–2022	Saint-Étienne	5	(0)
- * Club domestic league appearances and goals as of 13:10, 16 July 2025 (UTC)

El Hadji Dieye (born 1 January 2002) is a Senegalese professional footballer who plays as a winger.

== Club career ==
Dieye joined the reserves of Saint-Étienne 31 August 2021. He made his professional debut with Saint-Étienne in a 5–1 Ligue 1 win over Strasbourg on 17 October 2021.
