= Yanis Lhéry =

French footballer (born 2003)

Personal information
- Date of birth: 7 May 2003 (age 23)
- Place of birth: Tremblay-en-France, France
- Height: 1.76 m (5 ft 9 in)
- Position: Forward

Team information
- Current team: Khorazm
- Number: 10

Youth career
- 2010–2015: FC Livry-Gargan
- 2015–2018: FC Montfermeil
- 2018–2020: Saint-Étienne

Senior career*
Years	Team	Apps	(Gls)
2020–2025	Saint-Étienne B	39	(14)
2021–2024	Saint-Étienne	7	(0)
2023–2024	→ Progrès Niederkorn (loan)	11	(1)
2025	Alcorcón B	6	(1)
2025	Alcorcón	10	(0)
2025	→ UD Logroñés (loan)	8	(1)
2026–	Khorazm	12	(1)

International career
2019	France U16	6	(1)
2019	France U17	1	(0)
- * Club domestic league appearances and goals as of 29 July 2026

Yanis Lhéry (born 7 May 2003) is a French professional footballer who plays as a forward for Uzbekistan Super League club on Khorazm.

== Club career ==
Lhéry made his professional debut for Saint-Étienne on 23 May 2021 in a match against Dijon.

On 18 January 2025, Lhéry signed for Primera Federación club Alcorcón.

== Honours ==
Progrès Niederkorn

- Luxembourg Cup: 2023–24
