= Mathieu Cafaro =

French footballer (born 1997)

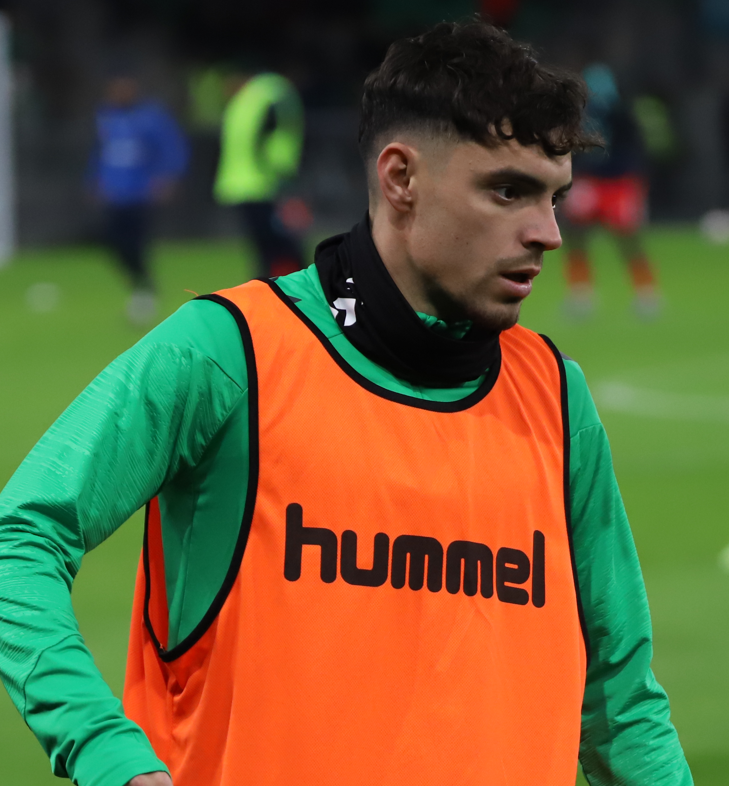
- Cafaro warming up for Saint-Étienne in 2024

Personal information
- Date of birth: 25 March 1997 (age 29)
- Place of birth: Saint-Doulchard, France
- Height: 1.78 m (5 ft 10 in)
- Position: Midfielder

Team information
- Current team: Nantes
- Number: 20

Youth career
- –2016: Toulouse

Senior career*
Years	Team	Apps	(Gls)
2015–2017	Toulouse B	28	(11)
2016	Toulouse	4	(0)
2017–2018	Reims B	17	(3)
2017–2022	Reims	83	(12)
2022–2023	Standard Liège	12	(2)
2022–2023	→ Saint-Étienne (loan)	33	(5)
2023–2025	Saint-Étienne	49	(5)
2025–2026	Paris FC	21	(4)
2026–	Nantes	0	(0)
- * Club domestic league appearances and goals as of 19 May 2026

Mathieu Cafaro (born 25 March 1997) is a French professional footballer who plays as a midfielder for Ligue 2 club Nantes.

== Career ==
=== Toulouse ===
Cafaro is a youth product of Toulouse. He made his Ligue 1 debut on 10 September 2015 against Bastia. On 3 April 2017, he was released from the club, along with Odsonne Édouard, due to inappropriate behavior outside the club involving the shooting of a passer-by with an airsoft gun. Cafaro later admitted that he was the one who shot the gun. On 13 June, the Toulouse Prosecutor requested a four-month suspended prison sentence and a €6,000 fine for Édouard's involvement. Édouard claimed that Cafaro was the shooter while Cafaro stated he was not in the car at the time of the incident.

=== Reims ===
Cafaro helped Reims win the 2017–18 Ligue 2, which earned them promotion to the Ligue 1 for the 2018–19 season. He participated in one league match during the campaign, a 3–1 win over Niort on 27 April 2018. Cafaro would go on to score twelve goals in eighty-two Ligue 1 matches for Reims before leaving the club in January 2022.

=== Standard Liège ===
On 11 January 2022, Cafaro signed for Belgian club Standard Liège. The deal reportedly involved no transfer fee, although Reims were given a "considerable" sell-on percentage fee.

=== Saint-Étienne ===
On 20 July 2022, Cafaro joined Ligue 2 club Saint-Étienne on a season-long loan with an option-to-buy. He eventually joined the club permanently in June 2023.

=== Paris FC ===
On 3 February 2025, Cafaro signed a two-and-a-half-year contract with Paris FC in Ligue 2.

=== Nantes ===
On 18 July 2026, Cafaro moved to Nantes in Ligue 2 on a two-year deal.

== Personal life ==
Cafaro is of Italian descent through his paternal grandfather.

== Honours ==
Reims

- Ligue 2: 2017–18
