= Anthony Briançon =

French footballer (born 1994)

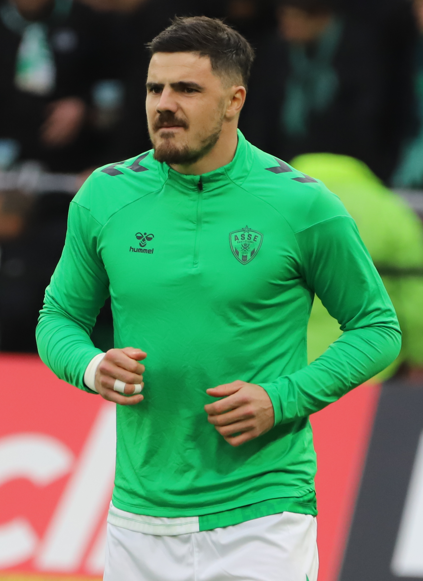

Personal information
- Full name: Anthony Briançon
- Date of birth: 28 November 1994 (age 31)
- Place of birth: Avignon, France
- Height: 1.85 m (6 ft 1 in)
- Position: Defensive midfielder

Team information
- Current team: Pau
- Number: 23

Youth career
- –2014: Nîmes

Senior career*
Years	Team	Apps	(Gls)
2012–2015	Nîmes B	30	(0)
2014–2022	Nîmes	201	(16)
2022–2025	Saint-Étienne	57	(2)
2025	Saint-Étienne B	1	(0)
2025–	Pau	20	(0)
- * Club domestic league appearances and goals as of 11 May 2026

Anthony Briançon (born 28 November 1994) is a French professional footballer who plays as a defensive midfielder for Ligue 2 club Pau.

== Career ==
Briançon is a youth exponent from Nîmes. He made his Ligue 2 debut at 16 May 2014 against Créteil, replacing Pierre Bouby after 54 minutes in a 1–1 away draw.

On 22 June 2022, Briançon signed for newly-relegated Ligue 2 side Saint-Étienne on a three-year contract.

== Career statistics ==
=== Club ===
As of 18 August 2024

Appearances and goals by club, season and competition
Club	Season	League			Coupe de France		Coupe de la Ligue		Other		Total	
Club	Season	Division	Apps	Goals	Apps	Goals	Apps	Goals	Apps	Goals	Apps	Goals
Nimes B	2012-13	CFA2	5	0	—		—		—		5	0
Nimes B	2013-14	CFA2	18	0	—		—		—		18	0
Nimes B	2014-15	CFA2	6	0	—		—		—		6	0
Nimes B	2015-16	CFA2	1	0	—		—		—		1	0
Nimes B	Total		30	0	—		—		—		30	0
Nîmes	2013-14	Ligue 2	1	0	—		—		—		1	0
Nîmes	2014-15	Ligue 2	28	0	1	0	1	0	—		30	0
Nîmes	2015-16	Ligue 2	26	3	1	0	1	0	—		28	3
Nîmes	2016-17	Ligue 2	34	6	—		1	0	—		35	6
Nîmes	2017-18	Ligue 2	37	3	3	0	1	1	—		41	4
Nîmes	2018-19	Ligue 1	33	2	0	0	0	0	—		33	2
Nîmes	2019-20	Ligue 1	22	1	1	1	1	0	—		24	2
Nîmes	2020-21	Ligue 1	16	0	—		—		—		16	0
Nîmes	2021-22	Ligue 2	4	1	0	0	—		—		4	1
Nîmes	Total		201	16	6	1	5	1	—		212	18
Saint-Étienne	2022-23	Ligue 2	24	1	1	0	—		—		25	1
Saint-Étienne	2023-24	Ligue 2	32	1	0	0	—		0	0	32	1
Saint-Étienne	2024-25	Ligue 1	0	0	—		—		—		0	0
Saint-Étienne	Total		56	2	1	0	—		0	0	57	2
Career Total			287	18	7	1	5	1	0	0	299	20

== Honours ==
Individual

- UNFP Ligue 2 Team of the Year: 2023–24
