= 2019–20 AS Saint-Étienne season =

Saint-Étienne
2019–20 season
- President: Bernard Caïazzo
- Head coach: Ghislain Printant (until 4 October); Claude Puel (from 4 October)
- Stadium: Stade Geoffroy-Guichard
- Ligue 1: 17th
- Coupe de France: Runners-up
- Coupe de la Ligue: Quarter-finals
- UEFA Europa League: Group stage
- Top goalscorer: League: Denis Bouanga (10); All: Denis Bouanga (12)
- Highest home attendance: 36,391 (vs Paris Saint-Germain, 15 December 2019)
- Lowest home attendance: 0 (vs Nantes, 12 January 2019)
- Average home league attendance: 22,925
- Biggest win: Saint-Étienne 4–1 Nice
- Biggest defeat: Paris Saint-Germain 6–1 Saint-Étienne
Home colours	Away colours	Third colours

The 2019–20 season was AS Saint-Étienne's 86th season in existence and the club's 16th consecutive season in the topflight of French football. In addition to the domestic league, Saint-Étienne participated in this season's editions of the Coupe de la Ligue, the UEFA Europa League, and also participated in the Coupe de France. The season covered the period from 1 July 2019 to 24 July 2020.

In early October 2019, Claude Puel was appointed as new coach after a series of poor results succeeding the sacked Ghislain Printant.

== Players ==
=== Squad ===
As of 18 January 2020.

Note: Flags indicate national team as defined under FIFA eligibility rules; some limited exceptions apply. Players may hold more than one non-FIFA nationality.

No.	Pos.	Nation	Player
1	GK	FRA	Théo Vermot
2	DF	CMR	Harold Moukoudi
3	DF	SUI	Léo Lacroix
4	DF	FRA	William Saliba (on loan from Arsenal)
5	DF	FRA	Timothée Kolodziejczak (on loan from Tigres)
6	MF	FRA	Yann M'Vila
7	MF	ALG	Ryad Boudebouz
8	MF	FRA	Mahdi Camara
9	FW	FRA	Loïs Diony
10	FW	TUN	Wahbi Khazri
11	DF	BRA	Gabriel Silva
13	DF	PER	Miguel Trauco
14	FW	FRA	Franck Honorat
15	MF	FRA	Bilal Benkhedim
16	GK	FRA	Stéphane Ruffier

No.	Pos.	Nation	Player
17	MF	CIV	Jean-Eudes Aholou (on loan from Monaco)
18	FW	FRA	Arnaud Nordin
20	MF	GAB	Denis Bouanga
21	FW	FRA	Romain Hamouma
22	MF	FRA	Kévin Monnet-Paquet
23	DF	ESP	Sergi Palencia
24	DF	FRA	Loïc Perrin (captain)
25	MF	SEN	Assane Dioussé
26	DF	FRA	Mathieu Debuchy
28	MF	FRA	Zaydou Youssouf
29	MF	FRA	Yohan Cabaye
30	GK	FRA	Jessy Moulin
31	FW	FRA	Charles Abi
32	DF	FRA	Wesley Fofana
40	GK	FRA	Stefan Bajic

=== Out on loan ===
Note: Flags indicate national team as defined under FIFA eligibility rules; some limited exceptions apply. Players may hold more than one non-FIFA nationality.

No.	Pos.	Nation	Player
—	GK	FRA	Alexis Guendouz (on loan to Pau)
—	DF	GRE	Alexandros Katranis (on loan to Atromitos)
—	DF	FRA	Alpha Sissoko (on loan to Le Puy)
—	MF	FRA	Rayan Souici (on loan to Servette)

No.	Pos.	Nation	Player
—	FW	FRA	Lamine Ghezali (on loan to Châteauroux)
—	FW	CPV	Vagner Gonçalves (on loan to Nancy)
—	FW	SEN	Makhtar Gueye (on loan to Nancy)

=== Reserve squad ===
As of 22 November 2018

Note: Flags indicate national team as defined under FIFA eligibility rules; some limited exceptions apply. Players may hold more than one non-FIFA nationality.

No.	Pos.	Nation	Player
—	GK	FRA	Nathan Crémillieux
—	GK	FRA	Etienne Green
—	GK	FRA	Killian Le Roy
—	DF	FRA	Mickaël Nadé
—	DF	FRA	Léo Pétrot
—	DF	FRA	Mathis Mezaber
—	DF	FRA	Quentin Vogt
—	DF	FRA	Jordan Halaima
—	DF	FRA	Marvin Tshibuabua
—	DF	FRA	Dilhan Sagun

No.	Pos.	Nation	Player
—	MF	FRA	Maxence Rivera
—	MF	FRA	Lucas Llort
—	MF	FRA	Adrien Fleury
—	MF	FRA	Cyril Martin
—	MF	FRA	Alexandre Valbon
—	MF	FRA	Aimen Moueffek
—	FW	GUI	Augustin Bangoura
—	FW	FRA	Samy Baghdadi
—	FW	FRA	Tyrone Tormin
—	FW	GBS	Edmilson

== Pre-season and friendlies ==
Win Draw Loss

9 July 2019 Friendly	Andrézieux	1–2	Saint-Étienne	Andrézieux-Bouthéon, France
19:00 CEST (UTC+2)	Bojang 52'	Report	Nordin 14'; Gueye 81' (pen.)	Stadium: L'Envol Stadium

13 July 2019 Friendly	Clermont	1–1	Saint-Étienne	Espaly-Saint-Marcel, France
20:00 CEST (UTC+2)	Grbić 68'	Report	Bouanga 45'	Stadium: Stade du Viouzou

19 July 2019 Friendly	Saint-Étienne	4–2	Montpellier	Washington, D.C., United States
18:00 EDT (UTC−4)	Palencia (yellow card) 32'; Debuchy 33', 73'; Cabella 52'; Diony 83'	Report	Hilton 35'; Laborde 45' (pen.)	Stadium: Audi Field

28 July 2019 Friendly	Middlesbrough	1–1	Saint-Étienne	Middlesbrough, England
15:00 BST (UTC+1)	Wing 69'	Report	Bouanga 67' (pen.)	Stadium: Riverside Stadium; Attendance: 6,520; Referee: Andrew Madley

3 August 2019 Friendly	Newcastle United	2–1	Saint-Étienne	Newcastle upon Tyne, England
15:00 BST (UTC+1)	Joelinton 39'; M. Longstaff 73'	Report	Debuchy 85'	Stadium: St. James' Park

4 July 2020 Friendly	Saint-Étienne	4–1	GFA Rumilly-Vallières	L'Étrat, France
15:00 CEST (UTC+2)	Krasso 13'; Rivera 30'; Abi 57', 87'	Report	Viglierco 24'	Stadium: Centre sportif Robert-Herbin; Attendance: 0

10 July 2020 Friendly	Saint-Étienne	4–1	Nice	Saint-Étienne, France
18:00 CEST (UTC+2)	Krasso 41'; Abi 46', 56'; Maçon 52'	Report	Thuram 17'	Stadium: Stade Geoffroy-Guichard; Attendance: 0 Referee: Olivier Thual

15 July 2020 Friendly	Saint-Étienne	4–0	Charleroi	L'Étrat, France
17:30 CEST (UTC+2)	Fofana 44'; Krasso 78'; Boudebouz 82', 84' (pen.)	Report		Stadium: Centre sportif Robert-Herbin

18 July 2020 Friendly	Saint-Étienne	1–2	Anderlecht	Saint-Étienne, France
15:30 CEST (UTC+2)	Boudebouz 45' (pen.)	Report	Vlap 18' (pen.); Roofe 68'	Stadium: Stade Geoffroy-Guichard

18 July 2020 Friendly	Saint-Étienne	0–1	Anderlecht	Saint-Étienne, France
17:30 CEST (UTC+2)		Report	Delcroix 2'	Stadium: Stade Geoffroy-Guichard

== Competitions ==
=== Overview ===
Competition	First match	Last match	Starting round	Final position	Record							
Competition	First match	Last match	Starting round	Final position	Pld	W	D	L	GF	GA	GD	Win %
Ligue 1	10 August 2019	8 March 2020	Matchday 1	17th	28	8	6	14	29	45	−16	28.57
Coupe de France	5 January 2020	24 July 2020	Round of 64	Runners-up	6	5	0	1	11	5	+6	83.33
Coupe de la Ligue	18 December 2019	8 January 2020	Round of 16	Quarter-finals	2	1	0	1	3	7	−4	50.00
Europa League	19 September 2019	12 December 2019	Group stage	Group stage	6	0	4	2	6	8	−2	0.00
Total					42	14	10	18	49	65	−16	33.33

Source: Soccerway

=== Ligue 1 ===
==== League table ====
Pos	Team	Pld	W	D	L	GF	GA	GD	Pts	PPG	Qualification or relegation
15	Metz	28	8	10	10	27	35	−8	34	1.21	
16	Dijon	28	7	9	12	27	37	−10	30	1.07	
17	Saint-Étienne	28	8	6	14	29	45	−16	30	1.07	
18	Nîmes (Note: Originally, the 18th-placed Ligue 1 team would play in promotion-relegation play-offs at the end of the season with a team from Ligue 2 to decide whether they would remain in Ligue 1 for the 2020–21 season, but the play-offs were cancelled and the 18th-placed team remained in Ligue 1.)	28	7	6	15	29	44	−15	27	0.96	
19	Amiens (R)	28	4	11	13	31	50	−19	23	0.82	Relegation to Ligue 2

Source: Ligue 1
Rules for classification: 1) Points per game; 2) Head-to-head points; 3) Head-to-head goal difference; 4) Goal difference; 5) Goals scored; 6) Fairplay ranking.
(R) Relegated

==== Results summary ====
Overall								Home						Away					
Pld	W	D	L	GF	GA	GD	Pts	W	D	L	GF	GA	GD	W	D	L	GF	GA	GD
28	8	6	14	29	45	−16	30	4	6	4	15	18	−3	4	0	10	14	27	−13

Source: Ligue 1

==== Results by round ====
Round	1	2	3	4	5	6	7	8	9	10	11	12	13	14	15	16	17	18	19	20	21	22	23	24	25	26	27	28	29	30	31	32	33	34	35	36	37	38
Ground	A	H	A	A	H	A	H	A	H	A	H	H	A	H	A	H	A	H	A	H	H	A	H	A	A	H	A	H	A	H	A	H	A	H	A	H	A	H
Result	W	D	L	L	D	L	L	W	W	W	D	W	W	D	L	W	L	L	L	L	W	L	L	L	L	D	L	D	C	C	C	C	C	C	C	C	C	C
Position	5	6	14	16	15	17	19	19	13	10	12	8	4	5	9	5	8	11	14	15	15	15	15	15	16	15	16	17	17	17	17	17	17	17	17	17	17	17

Source: Ligue 1
A = Away; H = Home; W = Win; D = Draw; L = Loss; C = Cancelled

==== Matches ====
The Ligue 1 schedule was announced on 14 June 2019. The Ligue 1 matches were suspended by the LFP on 13 March 2020 due to COVID-19 until further notices. On 28 April 2020, it was announced that Ligue 1 and Ligue 2 campaigns would not resume, after the country banned all sporting events until September. On 30 April, The LFP ended officially the 2019–20 season.

10 August 2019 1	Dijon	1–2	Saint-Étienne	Dijon
20:00 CEST (UTC+2)	Tavares 34' (pen.)	Report	Hamouma 5'; Aholou 11', (yellow card) 46'; Debuchy (yellow card) 33'	Stadium: Stade Gaston Gérard; Attendance: 14,334; Referee: Thomas Leonard

18 August 2019 2	Saint-Étienne	1–1	Brest	Saint-Étienne
15:00 CEST (UTC+2)	Bouanga 83'; Moukoudi (yellow card) 85'	Report	Belkebla (yellow card) 18'; Faussurier 45+1'; Charbonnier (yellow card) 65'	Stadium: Stade Geoffroy-Guichard; Attendance: 28,645; Referee: Johan Hamel

28 August 2019 3	Lille	3–0	Saint-Étienne	Villeneuve-d'Ascq
19:00 CEST (UTC+2)	Osimhen 37', 75'; Bamba 69' (pen.)	Report		Stadium: Stade Pierre-Mauroy; Attendance: 36,138; Referee: Olivier Thual

1 September 2019 4	Marseille	1–0	Saint-Étienne	Marseille
21:00 CEST (UTC+2)	Benedetto 33'; Sanson (yellow card) 60'; Amavi (yellow card) 66'; Lopez (yellow card) 87'; Khaoui (yellow card) 88'; Strootman (yellow card) 90+2'	Report	Moukoudi (yellow card) 14'; Perrin (yellow card) 73'	Stadium: Stade Vélodrome; Attendance: 44,074; Referee: Benoît Millot

15 September 2019 5	Saint-Étienne	2–2	Toulouse	Saint-Étienne
17:00 CEST (UTC+2)	Perrin (yellow card) 37'; Hamouma 45', 57'; Moukoudi (yellow card) 79'; Youssouf (yellow card) 90+1'	Report	Gradel 15' (pen.); Leya Iseka 25'	Stadium: Stade Geoffroy-Guichard; Attendance: 24,240; Referee: Jérémy Stinat

22 September 2019 6	Angers	4–1	Saint-Étienne	Angers
17:00 CEST (UTC+2)	Capelle 48'; Aït-Nouri (yellow card) 75'; Ninga 78', 86', 89'	Report	Nordin 34'; Trauco (yellow card) 77'	Stadium: Stade Raymond Kopa; Attendance: 9,831; Referee: Frank Schneider

25 September 2019 7	Saint-Étienne	0–1	Metz	Saint-Étienne
19:00 CEST (UTC+2)	Kolodziejczak (yellow card) 52'; Nordin (yellow card) 61'; Khazri (yellow card) 84'; Bouanga (yellow card) 88'	Report	Diallo 19'; Traoré (yellow card) 25'; Cohade (yellow card) 84'	Stadium: Stade Geoffroy-Guichard; Attendance: 19,712; Referee: Eric Wattellier

29 September 2019 8	Nîmes	0–1	Saint-Étienne	Nîmes
17:00 CEST (UTC+2)	Alakouch (yellow card) 4'	Report	Cabaye (yellow card) 7'; Kolodziejczak (yellow card) 63'; Hamouma (yellow card) 64' (yellow-red card) 75'; Debuchy 68'	Stadium: Stade des Costières; Attendance: 13,802; Referee: Thomas Leonard

6 October 2019 9	Saint-Étienne	1–0	Lyon	Saint-Étienne
21:00 CEST (UTC+2)	Youssouf (yellow card) 37'; Berić 90'	Report	Marçal (yellow card) 19'; Jean Lucas (yellow card) 90+6'	Stadium: Stade Geoffroy-Guichard; Attendance: 34,071; Referee: Clément Turpin

20 October 2019 10	Bordeaux	0–1	Saint-Étienne	Bordeaux
15:00 CEST (UTC+2)		Report	Perrin (yellow card) 19'; Fofana (yellow card) 28'; Khazri (yellow card) 32'; Bouanga 90+2' (pen.)	Stadium: Matmut Atlantique; Attendance: 25,952; Referee: Ruddy Buquet

27 October 2019 11	Saint-Étienne	2–2	Amiens	Saint-Étienne
17:00 CET (UTC+1)	Khazri 45'; Fofana (yellow card) 71'; M'Vila (yellow card) 78'; Dibassy 80' (o.g.)	Report	Chedjou (yellow card) 24'; Mendoza 68'; Akolo 76'; Kakuta (yellow card) 79'; Calabresi (yellow card) 90'	Stadium: Stade Geoffroy-Guichard; Attendance: 18,877; Referee: Amaury Delerue

3 November 2019 12	Saint-Étienne	1–0	Monaco	Saint-Étienne
21:00 CET (UTC+1)	Aholou (yellow card) 32'; Bouanga 59'	Report	Silva (yellow card) 79'; Aguilar (red card) 90+2'; Henrichs (yellow card) 90+5'; Ben Yedder (yellow card) 90+5'	Stadium: Stade Geoffroy-Guichard; Attendance: 15,685; Referee: Jérôme Brisard

10 November 2019 13	Nantes	2–3	Saint-Étienne	Nantes
17:00 CET (UTC+1)	Blas 15'; Louza 26'; Girotto (yellow card) 45'	Report	Trauco 22'; Bouanga 34', 67'	Stadium: Stade de la Beaujoire; Attendance: 34,191; Referee: Clément Turpin

24 November 2019 14	Saint-Étienne	0–0	Montpellier	Saint-Étienne
17:00 CET (UTC+1)	Youssouf (yellow card) 27'; Perrin (yellow card) 28'; Trauco (yellow card) 54'	Report	Mendes (yellow card) 21'; Congré (yellow card) 61'; Mollet (yellow card) 90+2'	Stadium: Stade Geoffroy-Guichard; Attendance: 24,336; Referee: Frank Schneider

1 December 2019 15	Rennes	2–1	Saint-Étienne	Rennes
17:00 CET (UTC+1)	Raphinha 25'; Niang (yellow card) 40'; Da Silva 90+4'	Report	Diony 19'; Youssouf (yellow card) 29'; Kolodziejczak (yellow card) 69'; Palencia (yellow card) 84'	Stadium: Roazhon Park; Attendance: 26,738; Referee: Eric Wattellier

4 December 2019 16	Saint-Étienne	4–1	Nice	Saint-Étienne
19:00 CET (UTC+1)	Bouanga 11' (pen.), 58'; Hamouma 38'; Fofana 40'; Ruffier (yellow card) 49'; Diony (yellow card) 88'	Report	Dolberg 15'; Lees-Melou (yellow card) 24'; Lloris (yellow card) 60'; Burner (yellow card) 82'	Stadium: Stade Geoffroy-Guichard; Attendance: 20,138; Referee: Thomas Leonard

8 December 2019 17	Reims	3–1	Saint-Étienne	Reims
15:00 CET (UTC+1)	Oudin 11'; Foket (yellow card) 33'; Dia 68'; Kamara (yellow card) 90'; Doumbia 90+2'	Report	Fofana (yellow card) 6'; Aholou (yellow card) 54'; Hamouma 59'; Bouanga (yellow card) 64'	Stadium: Stade Auguste Delaune; Attendance: 14,512; Referee: Stéphanie Frappart

15 December 2019 18	Saint-Étienne	0–4	Paris Saint-Germain	Saint-Étienne
21:00 CET (UTC+1)	Trauco (yellow card) 20'; Aholou (red card) 25'	Report	Paredes 10'; Diallo (yellow card) 40'; Mbappé 44', 90'; Icardi 74'	Stadium: Stade Geoffroy-Guichard; Attendance: 36,391; Referee: Ruddy Buquet

21 December 2019 19	Strasbourg	2–1	Saint-Étienne	Strasbourg
20:45 CET (UTC+1)	Ajorque 22'; Thomasson (yellow card) 61', (goal) 62'; Da Costa (yellow card) 78'; Carole (yellow card) 90+1'	Report	Nordin (yellow card) 67'; Boudebouz 72' (pen.); Trauco (yellow card) 82'	Stadium: Stade de la Meinau; Attendance: 25,471; Referee: Olivier Thual

12 January 2020 20	Saint-Étienne	0–2	Nantes	Saint-Étienne
15:00 CET (UTC+1)	Khazri (yellow card) 52'; Palencia (yellow card) 69'	Report	Abeid 23'; Blas 48'; Louza (yellow card) 70'	Stadium: Stade Geoffroy-Guichard; Attendance: 0 (Note: The match was played behind closed doors due to punishment by the FFF.); Referee: Benoît Bastien

25 January 2020 21	Saint-Étienne	2–1	Nîmes	Saint-Étienne
20:00 CET (UTC+1)	Khazri 3', 34' (pen.); Honorat (yellow card) 26'; Dioussé (yellow card) 62'; Trauco (yellow card) 90+6'	Report	Ferhat 45'; Miguel (yellow card) 69'; Sarr (yellow card) 90+3'	Stadium: Stade Geoffroy-Guichard; Attendance: 23,927; Referee: Jérémy Stinat

2 February 2020 22	Metz	3–1	Saint-Étienne	Metz
17:00 CET (UTC+1)	Nguette 44', 70'; Diallo 63'	Report	Hamouma (yellow card) 52', (goal) 89'; Cabaye (yellow card) 73'	Stadium: Stade Saint-Symphorien; Attendance: 15,636; Referee: Antony Gautier

5 February 2020 23	Saint-Étienne	0–2	Marseille	Saint-Étienne
21:00 CET (UTC+1)	Fofana (yellow card) 61'; Khazri (yellow card) 65'	Report	Payet 7'; Amavi (yellow card) 25'; Radonjić (yellow card) 49', (goal) 85'; Rongier (yellow card) 57'	Stadium: Stade Geoffroy-Guichard; Attendance: 29,074; Referee: Jérôme Brisard

9 February 2020 24	Montpellier	1–0	Saint-Étienne	Montpellier
15:00 CET (UTC+1)	Delort 25'; Sambia (red card) 42'; Ristić (yellow card) 64'	Report	Perrin (yellow card) 17'; Fofana (yellow card) 45'; Bouanga (yellow card) 51'	Stadium: Stade de la Mosson; Attendance: 14,669; Referee: Amaury Delerue

16 February 2020 25	Brest	3–2	Saint-Étienne	Brest
17:00 CET (UTC+1)	Lasne 20'; Charbonnier 38'; Cardona 43'; Chardonnet (yellow card) 51'; Larsonneur (yellow card) 55'	Report	Maçon (yellow card) 2'; Bouanga 54' (pen.), (yellow card) 55'; Diony 69'; Cabaye (yellow card) 83'	Stadium: Stade Francis-Le Blé; Attendance: 13,399; Referee: Eric Wattellier

23 February 2020 26	Saint-Étienne	1–1	Reims	Saint-Étienne
15:00 CET (UTC+1)	Kolodziejczak (yellow card) 41'; Bouanga 73'	Report	Munetsi (yellow card) 87'; Dia 90+3' (pen.)	Stadium: Stade Geoffroy-Guichard; Attendance: 24,868; Referee: Benoît Bastien

1 March 2020 27	Lyon	2–0	Saint-Étienne	Décines-Charpieu
21:00 CET (UTC+1)	Dembélé 27', 90+5' (pen.), (yellow card) 67'; Dubois (yellow card) 53'; Tousart (yellow card) 77'; Bruno Guimarães (yellow card) 87'	Report	Debuchy (yellow card) 26'; Trauco (yellow card) 39'; Abi (yellow card) 77'; Kolodziejczak (yellow card) 90+3'	Stadium: Parc Olympique Lyonnais; Attendance: 52,772; Referee: Frank Schneider

8 March 2020 28	Saint-Étienne	1–1	Bordeaux	Saint-Étienne
15:00 CET (UTC+1)	Camara (yellow card) 23' (yellow-red card) 75'; Kolodziejczak (yellow card) 58'; Bouanga 68'; Abi (yellow card) 90+5'	Report	Koscielny (yellow card) 28'; Kalu (yellow card) 37'; Maja 65'; Sabaly (yellow card) 90+2'	Stadium: Stade Geoffroy-Guichard; Attendance: 24,912; Referee: Thomas Léonard

29	Monaco	Cancelled	Saint-Étienne	Monaco
--:-- CEST (UTC+2)				Stadium: Stade Louis II; Attendance: 0

30	Saint-Étienne	Cancelled	Strasbourg	Saint-Étienne
--:-- CEST (UTC+2)				Stadium: Stade Geoffroy-Guichard; Attendance: 0

31	Toulouse	Cancelled	Saint-Étienne	Toulouse
--:-- CEST (UTC+2)				Stadium: Stadium de Toulouse; Attendance: 0

32	Saint-Étienne	Cancelled	Rennes	Saint-Étienne
--:-- CEST (UTC+2)				Stadium: Stade Geoffroy-Guichard; Attendance: 0

33	Paris Saint-Germain	Cancelled	Saint-Étienne	Paris
--:-- CEST (UTC+2)				Stadium: Parc des Princes

34	Saint-Étienne	Cancelled	Angers	Saint-Étienne
--:-- CEST (UTC+2)				Stadium: Stade Geoffroy-Guichard

35	Amiens	Cancelled	Saint-Étienne	Amiens
--:-- CEST (UTC+2)				Stadium: Stade de la Licorne

36	Saint-Étienne	Cancelled	Lille	Saint-Étienne
--:-- CEST (UTC+2)				Stadium: Stade Geoffroy-Guichard

37	Nice	Cancelled	Saint-Étienne	Nice
--:-- CEST (UTC+2)				Stadium: Allianz Riviera

38	Saint-Étienne	Cancelled	Dijon	Saint-Étienne
--:-- CEST (UTC+2)				Stadium: Stade Geoffroy-Guichard

=== Coupe de France ===
5 January 2020 Round of 64	FC Bastia-Borgo	0–3	Saint-Étienne	Furiani
14:15 CET (UTC+1)	Traore (yellow card) 72'; Cropanese (yellow card) 82'	Report	Nordin 33', 90+3'; Fofana 45+1'; Palencia (yellow card) 90+2'; Cabaye (yellow card) 90+2'	Stadium: Stade Armand Cesari; Attendance: 4,992; Referee: Karim Abed

18 January 2020 Round of 32	Paris FC	2–3	Saint-Étienne	Paris
18:00 CET (UTC+1)	Ménez 23'; Pitroipa 56'; Kikonda (yellow card) 85'	Report	Khazri 31'; Nordin (yellow card) 32'; Abi 70'; Debuchy 78'; Cabaye (yellow card) 89'; Camara (yellow card) 90+3'	Stadium: Stade Sébastien Charléty; Attendance: 8,057; Referee: Frank Schneider

28 January 2020 Round of 16	Monaco	0–1	Saint-Étienne	Monaco
20:55 CET (UTC+1)	Golovin (yellow card) 90+3'	Report	Bouanga 24'; Aholou (yellow card) 46'; Fofana (yellow card) 49'; M'Vila (yellow card) 67'; Cabaye (yellow card) 72'	Stadium: Stade Louis II; Attendance: 3,485; Referee: Johan Hamel

13 February 2020 Quarter-finals	SAS Épinal	1–2	Saint-Étienne	Tomblaine
21:00 CET (UTC+1)	Tapé (yellow card) 9'; Krasso (yellow card) 26', (goal) 62' (pen.); Luvualu (yellow card) 47'; Makengo (yellow card) 81'	Report	Camara (yellow card) 29', (goal) 58'; Bouanga 37'; Saliba (yellow card) 60'	Stadium: Stade Marcel Picot; Attendance: 12,730; Referee: François Letexier

5 March 2020 Semi-finals	Saint-Étienne	2–1	Rennes	Saint-Étienne
20:55 CET (UTC+1)	Kolodziejczak 43'; Camara (yellow card) 68'; Boudebouz 90+4'	Report	Camavinga (yellow card) 19'; Traoré (yellow card) 28'; Niang 33' (pen.); Del Castillo (yellow card) 56'	Stadium: Stade Geoffroy-Guichard; Attendance: 30,535; Referee: Antony Gautier

24 July 2020 Final	Paris Saint-Germain	1–0	Saint-Étienne	Saint-Denis
21:10 CEST (UTC+2)	Neymar 14'; Bakker (yellow card) 29'; Paredes (yellow card) 29'; Verratti (yellow card) 31'; Marquinhos (yellow card) 35'	Report	Maçon (yellow card) 2'; Moulin (yellow card) 29'; Hamouma (yellow card) 29'; Perrin (red card) 31'; Camara (yellow card) 37'; M'Vila (yellow card) 51'; Fofana (yellow card) 90'	Stadium: Stade de France; Attendance: 5,000; Referee: Amaury Delerue
Note: Match originally scheduled for 25 April, but postponed due to concerns over the coronavirus pandemic, and rescheduled to 24 July.

=== Coupe de la Ligue ===
18 December 2019 Round of 16	Nîmes	1–2	Saint-Étienne	Nîmes
21:05 CET (UTC+1)	Stojanovski 68'	Report	Benkhedim 38'; Edmilson 50'; Youssouf (yellow card) 81'	Stadium: Stade des Costières; Attendance: 4,240; Referee: Antony Gautier

8 January 2020 Quarter-finals	Paris Saint-Germain	6–1	Saint-Étienne	Paris
21:05 CET (UTC+1)	Icardi 2', 49', 57'; Neymar 39'; Moulin 44' (o.g.); Mbappé 67'	Report	Camara (yellow card) 11'; Fofana (yellow card) 13' (yellow-red card) 31'; Debuchy (yellow card) 25'; Cabaye 71'	Stadium: Parc des Princes; Attendance: 47,677; Referee: Clément Turpin

=== UEFA Europa League ===
==== Group stage ====
Pos	Team	Pld	W	D	L	GF	GA	GD	Pts	Qualification	GNT	WLF	STE	OLE
1	(Belgium) Gent	6	3	3	0	11	7	+4	12	Advance to knockout phase	—	2–2	3–2	2–1
2	(Germany) VfL Wolfsburg	6	3	2	1	9	7	+2	11	Advance to knockout phase	1–3	—	1–0	3–1
3	(France) Saint-Étienne	6	0	4	2	6	8	−2	4		0–0	1–1	—	1–1
4	(Ukraine) Oleksandriya	6	0	3	3	6	10	−4	3		1–1	0–1	2–2	—

Source: UEFA
Rules for classification: Group stage tiebreakers

19 September 2019 1	Gent (Belgium)	3–2	(France) Saint-Étienne	Ghent, Belgium
21:00 CEST (UTC+2)	Jonathan David 2', 43'; Ngadeu-Ngadjui (yellow card) 49'; Kums (yellow card) 56'; Perrin 64' (o.g.)	Report	Khazri 38', (yellow card) 85'; Hamouma (yellow card) 44'; Trauco (yellow card) 71'; Kolodziejczak (yellow card) 73'; Kaminski 75' (o.g.)	Stadium: Ghelamco Arena; Attendance: 14,928; Referee: Roi Reinshreiber (Israel)

3 October 2019 2	Saint-Étienne (France)	1–1	(Germany) VfL Wolfsburg	Saint-Étienne, France
18:55 CEST (UTC+2)	Kolodziejczak 13'; Berić (yellow card) 40'	Report	William 15'; Arnold (yellow card) 50'; Bruma (yellow card) 84'	Stadium: Stade Geoffroy-Guichard; Attendance: 24,815; Referee: Craig Pawson (England)

24 October 2019 3	Saint-Étienne (France)	1–1	(Ukraine) Oleksandriya	Saint-Étienne, France
18:55 CEST (UTC+2)	Gabriel Silva 8', (yellow card) 49'	Report	Gabriel Silva 14' (o.g.); Miroshnichenko (yellow card) 40'; Shastal (yellow card) 90+3'	Stadium: Stade Geoffroy-Guichard; Attendance: 28,573; Referee: Espen Eskås (Norway)

7 November 2019 4	Oleksandriya (Ukraine)	2–2	(France) Saint-Étienne	Lviv, Ukraine
21:00 EET (UTC+2)	Pankiv (yellow card) 23'; Bezborodko 84'; Zaderaka 90+2'	Report	Khazri 24' (pen.); Fofana (yellow card) 43'; Youssouf (yellow card) 68'; Camara 73'	Stadium: Arena Lviv; Attendance: 6,361; Referee: João Pinheiro (Portugal)

28 November 2019 5	Saint-Étienne (France)	0–0	(Belgium) Gent	Saint-Étienne, France
18:55 CET (UTC+1)	Camara (yellow card) 79'	Report	Owusu (yellow card) 45'; Ngadeu-Ngadjui (yellow card) 64' (yellow-red card) 76'	Stadium: Stade Geoffroy-Guichard; Attendance: 25,315; Referee: Irfan Peljto (Bosnia and Herzegovina)

12 December 2019 6	VfL Wolfsburg (Germany)	1–0	(France) Saint-Étienne	Wolfsburg, Germany
21:00 CET (UTC+1)	Mbabu (yellow card) 24'; Otávio 52'; Steffen (yellow card) 90+4'	Report	Berić (yellow card) 21'; Kolodziejczak (yellow card) 78'	Stadium: Volkswagen Arena; Attendance: 10,802; Referee: Paul Tierney (England)

== Statistics ==
=== Squad statistics ===
No.	Pos	Nat	Player	Total		Ligue 1		Coupe de France		Coupe de la Ligue		Europa League	
No.	Pos	Nat	Player	Apps	Goals	Apps	Goals	Apps	Goals	Apps	Goals	Apps	Goals
1	GK	(France)	Théo Vermot	0	0	0	0	0	0	0	0	0	0
2	DF	(Cameroon)	Harold Moukoudi	14	0	10	0	0	0	1	0	3	0
3	DF	(Switzerland)	Léo Lacroix	0	0	0	0	0	0	0	0	0	0
4	DF	(France)	William Saliba	7	0	5	0	0	0	0	0	2	0
5	DF	(France)	Timothée Kolodziejczak	17	1	11	0	0	0	0	0	6	1
6	MF	(France)	Yann M'Vila	22	0	16	0	0	0	1	0	5	0
7	MF	(Algeria)	Ryad Boudebouz	21	1	18	1	0	0	0	0	3	0
8	MF	(France)	Mahdi Camara	10	1	7	0	0	0	1	0	2	1
9	FW	(France)	Loïs Diony	6	1	5	1	0	0	0	0	1	0
10	FW	(Tunisia)	Wahbi Khazri	15	3	12	1	0	0	0	0	3	2
11	DF	(Brazil)	Gabriel Silva	6	1	3	0	0	0	0	0	3	1
13	DF	(Peru)	Miguel Trauco	15	1	13	1	0	0	1	0	1	0
14	FW	(France)	Franck Honorat	6	0	4	0	0	0	0	0	2	0
15	MF	(France)	Bilal Benkhedim	3	1	1	0	0	0	1	1	1	0
16	GK	(France)	Stéphane Ruffier	20	0	16	0	0	0	0	0	4	0
17	MF	(Ivory Coast)	Jean-Eudes Aholou	12	1	8	1	0	0	0	0	4	0
18	FW	(France)	Arnaud Nordin	22	1	15	1	0	0	1	0	6	0
19	DF	(France)	Alpha Sissoko	0	0	0	0	0	0	0	0	0	0
20	FW	(Gabon)	Denis Bouanga	24	7	18	7	0	0	1	0	5	0
21	FW	(France)	Romain Hamouma	16	5	12	5	0	0	0	0	4	0
22	MF	(France)	Kévin Monnet-Paquet	0	0	0	0	0	0	0	0	0	0
23	DF	(Spain)	Sergi Palencia	7	0	5	0	0	0	1	0	1	0
24	DF	(France)	Loïc Perrin	21	0	16	0	0	0	1	0	4	0
25	MF	(Senegal)	Assane Dioussé	2	0	1	0	0	0	0	0	1	0
26	DF	(France)	Mathieu Debuchy	19	1	15	1	0	0	0	0	4	0
27	FW	(Slovenia)	Robert Berić	18	1	11	1	0	0	1	0	6	0
28	MF	(France)	Zaydou Youssouf	22	0	15	0	0	0	1	0	6	0
29	MF	(France)	Yohan Cabaye	8	0	7	0	0	0	0	0	1	0
30	GK	(France)	Jessy Moulin	5	0	2	0	0	0	1	0	2	0
31	FW	(France)	Charles Abi	9	0	7	0	0	0	0	0	2	0
32	DF	(France)	Wesley Fofana	11	1	8	1	0	0	1	0	2	0
33	MF	(Guinea-Bissau)	Edmilson	2	1	1	0	0	0	1	1	0	0
40	GK	(France)	Stefan Bajic	1	0	1	0	0	0	0	0	0	0

Last updated: 21 December 2019
Source: Soccerway

=== Goalscorers ===
As of matches played until 13 February 2020

Rank	No.	Pos.	Player	Ligue 1	Coupe de France	Coupe de la Ligue	Europa League	Total
1	20	MF	(Gabon) Denis Bouanga	7	2	0	0	9
2	10	FW	(Tunisia) Wahbi Khazri	3	1	0	2	6
2	21	FW	(France) Romain Hamouma	6	0	0	0	6
4	18	FW	(France) Arnaud Nordin	1	2	0	0	3
5	8	MF	(France) Mahdi Camara	0	1	0	1	2
5	26	DF	(France) Wesley Fofana	1	1	0	0	2
5	32	DF	(France) Wesley Fofana	1	1	0	0	2
8	31	FW	(France) Charles Abi	0	1	0	0	1
8	17	MF	(Ivory Coast) Jean-Eudes Aholou	1	0	0	0	1
8	15	MF	(France) Bilal Benkhedim	0	0	1	0	1
8	27	FW	(Slovenia) Robert Berić	1	0	0	0	1
8	7	MF	(Algeria) Ryad Boudebouz	1	0	0	0	1
8	29	MF	(France) Yohan Cabaye	0	0	1	0	1
8	9	FW	(France) Loïs Diony	1	0	0	0	1
8	33	MF	(Guinea-Bissau) Edmilson Correia	0	0	1	0	1
8	5	DF	(France) Timothée Kolodziejczak	0	0	0	1	1
8	11	DF	(Brazil) Gabriel Silva	0	0	0	1	1
8	13	DF	(Peru) Miguel Trauco	1	0	0	0	1
Own goals				1	0	0	1	2
TOTAL				25	9	3	6	43

=== Clean sheets ===
As of 21 December 2019

Rank	Name	Ligue 1	Coupe de France	Coupe de la Ligue	Europa League	Total
1	(France) Stéphane Ruffier	3	0	0	1	4
2	(France) Jessy Moulin	2	0	0	0	2
Total		5	0	0	1	6
