= 2021–22 AS Saint-Étienne season =

Saint-Étienne
2021–22 season
- President: Bernard Caïazzo
- Head coach: Claude Puel (until 5 December); Pascal Dupraz (from 14 December)
- Stadium: Stade Geoffroy-Guichard
- Ligue 1: 18th (relegated)
- Coupe de France: Round of 16
- Top goalscorer: League: Wahbi Khazri (10); All: Wahbi Khazri (10)
- Biggest win: Jura Sud Foot 1–4 Saint-Étienne
- Biggest defeat: Saint-Étienne 0–5 Rennes
Home colours	Away colours	Third colours

The 2021–22 season was the 103rd season in the existence of AS Saint-Étienne and the club's 18th consecutive season in the top flight of French football. In addition to the domestic league, Saint-Étienne participated in this season's editions of the Coupe de France.

On 29 May 2022, the club's relegation to the second division was confirmed after 18 years in the top tier.

== Players ==
=== First-team squad ===
As of 4 February 2022.

Note: Flags indicate national team as defined under FIFA eligibility rules; some limited exceptions apply. Players may hold more than one non-FIFA nationality.

No.	Pos.	Nation	Player
2	DF	CMR	Harold Moukoudi
3	DF	FRA	Mickaël Nadé
4	DF	GUI	Saïdou Sow
5	DF	FRA	Timothée Kolodziejczak (vice-captain)
6	MF	FRA	Lucas Gourna-Douath
7	MF	ALG	Ryad Boudebouz
8	MF	FRA	Mahdi Camara
9	FW	SEN	Sada Thioub (on loan from Angers)
10	FW	TUN	Wahbi Khazri (captain)
11	DF	BRA	Gabriel Silva
13	DF	PER	Miguel Trauco
14	DF	MLI	Falaye Sacko (on loan from Vitória S.C.)
15	MF	FRA	Bilal Benkhedim
16	GK	SEN	Boubacar Fall
17	MF	FRA	Adil Aouchiche

No.	Pos.	Nation	Player
18	FW	FRA	Arnaud Nordin
19	MF	CMR	Yvan Neyou
20	MF	GAB	Denis Bouanga
21	FW	FRA	Romain Hamouma (vice-captain)
22	DF	FRA	Eliaquim Mangala
23	DF	FRA	Joris Gnagnon
25	MF	SEN	Assane Dioussé
26	FW	MLI	Bakary Sako
27	DF	FRA	Yvann Maçon
28	MF	FRA	Zaydou Youssouf
29	MF	FRA	Aïmen Moueffek
30	MF	FRA	Maxence Rivera
31	FW	FRA	Enzo Crivelli (on loan from İstanbul Başakşehir)
40	GK	ENG	Etienne Green
50	GK	FRA	Paul Bernardoni (on loan from Angers)

=== Out on loan ===
Note: Flags indicate national team as defined under FIFA eligibility rules; some limited exceptions apply. Players may hold more than one non-FIFA nationality.

No.	Pos.	Nation	Player
—	DF	ESP	Sergi Palencia (at Leganés until 30 June 2022)
—	FW	CIV	Jean-Philippe Krasso (at AC Ajaccio until 30 June 2022)

No.	Pos.	Nation	Player
—	FW	FRA	Charles Abi (at Guingamp until 30 June 2022)

== Transfers ==
=== In ===
No.	Pos	Player	Transferred from	Fee	Date	Source
50	GK	(France) Paul Bernardoni	(France) Angers	Loan	5 January 2022	
22	DF	(France) Eliaquim Mangala	Free transfer		20 January 2022	
14	DF	(Senegal) Falaye Sacko	(Portugal) Vitória de Guimarães	Loan	31 January 2022	
31	FW	(France) Enzo Crivelli	(Turkey) İstanbul Başakşehir	Loan	31 January 2022	

=== Out ===
No.	Pos	Player	Transferred to	Fee	Date	Source
6	DF	(Senegal) Pape Abou Cissé	(Greece) Olympiacos	Loan return	30 June 2021	
14	FW	(France) Anthony Modeste	(Germany) 1. FC Köln	Loan return	30 June 2021	
30	GK	(France) Jessy Moulin	(France) Troyes	Free	19 July 2021	
26	DF	(France) Mathieu Debuchy	(France) Valenciennes	Free	13 August 2021	
9	FW	(France) Charles Abi	(France) Guingamp	Loan	31 August 2021	
14	FW	(Ivory Coast) Jean-Philippe Krasso	(France) Ajaccio	Loan	27 January 2022	

== Pre-season and friendlies ==
Win Draw Loss Fixtures

10 July 2021 Friendly	Saint-Étienne	2–2	Le Puy Foot 43	L'Étrat, France
18:30 CEST (UTC+2)	Krasso 47'; Saban 73'	Report	Fourrier 71'; Capoue 81'	Stadium: Stade Aimé Jacquet

16 July 2021 Friendly	Saint-Étienne	1–1	Bourg-Péronnas	L'Étrat, France
18:00 CEST (UTC+2)	Krasso 63' (pen.)	Report	El Ouazzani 77'	Stadium: Stade Aimé Jacquet

17 July 2021 Friendly	Saint-Étienne	2–1	Grenoble	Andrézieux-Bouthéon, France
18:00 CEST (UTC+2)	Bouanga 31'; Tormin 85' (pen.)	Report	Diallo 2'	Stadium: L'Envol Stadium

21 July 2021 Friendly	Saint-Étienne	Cancelled	Nice	Aix-les-Bains, France
18:00 CEST (UTC+2)				Stadium: Stade Municipal Jacques Forestier
Note: The match was called off at the request of Nice due to time constraints.

24 July 2021 Friendly	Saint-Étienne	2–3	Clermont	Saint-Étienne, France
18:00 CEST (UTC+2)	Abi 27'; Boudebouz 66' (pen.)	Report	N'Simba 35'; Bayo 62'; Rashani 64'	Stadium: Stade Geoffroy-Guichard

28 July 2021 Friendly	Saint-Étienne	1–2	Marseille	Gueugnon, France
21:00 CEST (UTC+2)	Khazri 20', (yellow card) 24'; Gabard (yellow card) 72'	Report	De la Fuente 2'; Payet (yellow card) 37'; Guendouzi (yellow card) 62'; Álvaro 87'	Stadium: Stade Jean Laville; Attendance: 7,000

31 July 2021 Friendly	Eintracht Frankfurt	2–1	Saint-Étienne	Frankfurt, Germany
15:30 CEST (UTC+2)	Lenz 12'; Borré 41' (pen.); Tuta (yellow card) 49'; Ndicka (yellow card) 59'	Report	Kolodziejczak 74'	Stadium: Deutsche Bank Park; Attendance: 10,000

== Competitions ==
=== Overall record ===
Competition	First match	Last match	Starting round	Final position	Record							
Competition	First match	Last match	Starting round	Final position	Pld	W	D	L	GF	GA	GD	Win %
Ligue 1	8 August 2021	21 May 2022	Matchday 1	18th	38	7	11	20	42	77	−35	18.42
Ligue 1 relegation play-offs	26 May 2022	29 May 2022	First leg	Runners-up	2	0	2	0	2	2	+0	0.00
Coupe de France	19 December 2021	30 January 2022	Round of 64	Round of 16	3	2	0	1	5	2	+3	66.67
Total					43	9	13	21	49	81	−32	20.93

Source: Soccerway

=== Ligue 1 ===
==== League table ====
Pos	Team	Pld	W	D	L	GF	GA	GD	Pts	Qualification or relegation
16	Lorient	38	8	12	18	35	63	−28	36	
17	Clermont	38	9	9	20	38	69	−31	36	
18	Saint-Étienne (R)	38	7	11	20	42	77	−35	32	Qualification for the relegation play-offs
19	Metz (R)	38	6	13	19	35	69	−34	31	Relegation to Ligue 2 (Note: Bordeaux were initially relegated to Ligue 2. However, on 14 June it was decided by the DNCG to relegate Bordeaux administratively to the Championnat National for financial issues. On 27 July 2022, Bordeaux won its appeal and was officially maintained in Ligue 2 for the 2022–23 season.)
20	Bordeaux (R)	38	6	13	19	52	91	−39	31	Relegation to Ligue 2

Source: Ligue 1
Rules for classification: 1) Points; 2) Goal difference; 3) Head-to-head points; 4) Head-to-head goal difference; 5) Head-to-head goals scored; 6) Head-to-head away goals scored; 7) Goals scored; 8) Away goals scored; 9) Fair-play points (Note: Head-to-head record is used only after all the matches between the teams in question have been played).
(R) Relegated

==== Results summary ====
Overall								Home						Away					
Pld	W	D	L	GF	GA	GD	Pts	W	D	L	GF	GA	GD	W	D	L	GF	GA	GD
38	7	11	20	42	77	−35	32	4	6	9	23	38	−15	3	5	11	19	39	−20

Source: Ligue 1

==== Results by round ====
Round	1	2	3	4	5	6	7	8	9	10	11	12	13	14	15	16	17	18	19	20	21	22	23	24	25	26	27	28	29	30	31	32	33	34	35	36	37	38
Ground	H	A	H	A	A	H	A	H	H	A	H	A	H	A	H	A	H	A	H	A	H	A	H	A	H	A	H	A	H	H	A	H	A	H	A	A	H	A
Result	D	D	D	L	L	L	L	L	D	L	D	D	W	W	L	L	L	L	L	W	L	L	W	W	D	L	W	D	D	L	L	W	D	L	L	L	L	D
Position	14	10	11	16	19	19	19	20	20	20	20	20	19	19	20	20	20	20	20	20	20	20	20	18	16	19	17	18	18	18	18	17	18	18	18	18	19	18

Source: Ligue 1
A = Away; H = Home; W = Win; D = Draw; L = Loss

==== Matches ====
The league fixtures were announced on 25 June 2021.

8 August 2021 1	Saint-Étienne	1–1	Lorient	Saint-Étienne
15:00 CEST (UTC+2)	Kolodziejczak (yellow card) 35'; Youssouf (yellow card) 57'; Khazri 70' (pen.)	Report	Lemoine (yellow card) 45+1'; Igor (yellow card) 48'; Le Goff 52', (yellow card) 66'	Stadium: Stade Geoffroy-Guichard; Attendance: 20,461; Referee: Thomas Léonard

15 August 2021 2	Lens	2–2	Saint-Étienne	Lens
17:00 CEST (UTC+2)	Medina (yellow card) 18'; Ganago 36'; Fofana 77'	Report	Khazri 1'; Hamouma (yellow card) 29'; Sow (yellow card) 41'; Bouanga 52', (yellow card) 57'; Gourna-Douath (yellow card) 85'; Maçon (yellow card) 86'	Stadium: Stade Bollaert-Delelis; Attendance: 35,541; Referee: Amaury Delerue

21 August 2021 3	Saint-Étienne	1–1	Lille	Saint-Étienne
21:00 CEST (UTC+2)	Khazri (yellow card) 80'; Sow 85'	Report	Djaló (yellow card) 19'; Yılmaz (yellow card) 20', (goal) 38'; Xeka (yellow card) 78'	Stadium: Stade Geoffroy-Guichard; Attendance: 20,673; Referee: Mikael Lesage

28 August 2021 4	Marseille	3–1	Saint-Étienne	Marseille
21:00 CEST (UTC+2)	Guendouzi 23'; Gerson 51'; Ünder 69'; Gueye (yellow card) 87'	Report	Kolodziejczak 32'; Khazri (yellow card) 42'; Maçon (yellow card) 49'; Camara (yellow card) 61'	Stadium: Stade Vélodrome; Attendance: 55,039; Referee: Benoît Millot

12 September 2021 5	Montpellier	2–0	Saint-Étienne	Montpellier
13:00 CEST (UTC+2)	Mavididi 32'; Wahi (yellow card) 34'; Germain 62'	Report	Bouanga (yellow card) 55'; Neyou (yellow card) 69'; Nadé (yellow card) 73'; Saban (yellow card) 88'	Stadium: Stade de la Mosson; Attendance: 10,402; Referee: Benoît Bastien

18 September 2021 6	Saint-Étienne	1–2	Bordeaux	Saint-Étienne
21:00 CEST (UTC+2)	Hamouma (yellow card) 17'; Khazri 73'	Report	Hwang 7', 80'; Onana (yellow card) 32'; Mangas (yellow card) 56'; Dilrosun (yellow card) 64'; Costil (yellow card) 74'	Stadium: Stade Geoffroy-Guichard; Attendance: 23,869; Referee: Antony Gautier

22 September 2021 7	Monaco	3–1	Saint-Étienne	Monaco
19:00 CEST (UTC+2)	Sidibé (yellow card) 23'; Volland 27'; Ben Yedder 62' (pen.), 86'	Report	Green (red card) 33'; Bouanga 41'; Kolodziejczak (yellow card) 61'	Stadium: Stade Louis II; Attendance: 3,579; Referee: Jérôme Brisard

25 September 2021 8	Saint-Étienne	0–3	Nice	Saint-Étienne
17:00 CEST (UTC+2)		Report	Gouiri 15'; Kamara (yellow card) 45'; Stengs 54'; Delort 83'; Todibo (yellow card) 90+2'	Stadium: Stade Geoffroy-Guichard; Attendance: 19,980; Referee: Amaury Delerue

3 October 2021 9	Saint-Étienne	1–1	Lyon	Saint-Étienne
21:00 CEST (UTC+2)	Nordin (yellow card) 32'; Camara (yellow card) 45+3'; Khazri 90+4' (pen.)	Report	Aouar 42'; Dubois (yellow card) 45+3'; Lopes (red card) 74'; Toko Ekambi (yellow card) 90+1'; Denayer (yellow card) 90+3'	Stadium: Stade Geoffroy-Guichard; Attendance: 33,643; Referee: François Letexier

17 October 2021 10	Strasbourg	5–1	Saint-Étienne	Strasbourg
15:00 CEST (UTC+2)	Guilbert (yellow card) 19'; Le Marchand 26', (yellow card) 45+3'; Youssouf 38' (o.g.); Gameiro 69'; Ajorque 73'; Caci (yellow card) 83'; Diallo 85'	Report	Moukoudi (yellow card) 11'; Youssouf (red card) 44'; Khazri 45+5' (pen.); Gourna-Douath (yellow card) 88'	Stadium: Stade de la Meinau; Attendance: 25,371; Referee: Mikael Lesage

22 October 2021 11	Saint-Étienne	2–2	Angers	Saint-Étienne
21:00 CEST (UTC+2)	Khazri 61'; Nadé 90+4'	Report	Traoré 28'; Boufal (yellow card) 45+1'; Fulgini 56'; Mendy (yellow card) 60'; Mangani (yellow card) 90+1'	Stadium: Stade Geoffroy-Guichard; Attendance: 19,836; Referee: Antony Gautier

30 October 2021 12	Metz	1–1	Saint-Étienne	Metz
17:00 CEST (UTC+2)	Boulaya 9'	Report	Khazri 16'; Maçon (yellow card) 18'; Sow (yellow card) 28'; Camara (yellow card) 87'	Stadium: Stade Saint-Symphorien; Attendance: 15,914; Referee: Stéphanie Frappart

7 November 2021 13	Saint-Étienne	3–2	Clermont	Saint-Étienne
15:00 CET (UTC+1)	Trauco (yellow card) 72'; Nordin 78'; Krasso 90+2'; Sow 90+4'	Report	Bayo 59'; Berthomier 64'	Stadium: Stade Geoffroy-Guichard; Attendance: 0 Referee: Pierre Gaillouste

21 November 2021 14	Troyes	0–1	Saint-Étienne	Troyes
15:00 CET (UTC+1)	Salmier (yellow card) 21'	Report	Aouchiche (yellow card) 36'; Youssouf (yellow card) 48'; Trauco 60'; Nadé (yellow card) 75'; Green (yellow card) 90+1'	Stadium: Stade de l'Aube; Attendance: 10,644; Referee: Florent Batta

28 November 2021 15	Saint-Étienne	1–3	Paris Saint-Germain	Saint-Étienne
13:00 CET (UTC+1)	Sissoko (yellow card) 18'; Bouanga 25'; Boudebouz (yellow card) 32'; Camara (yellow card) 36'; Kolodziejczak (red card) 45'	Report	Bernat (yellow card) 33'; Marquinhos 45+2', 90+1'; Di María 79'	Stadium: Stade Geoffroy-Guichard; Attendance: 24,586; Referee: Jérôme Brisard

1 December 2021 16	Brest	1–0	Saint-Étienne	Brest
19:00 CET (UTC+1)	Pierre-Gabriel (yellow card) 61'; Faivre 64' (pen.); Agoumé (yellow card) 67'	Report	Gourna-Douath (yellow card) 58'; Trauco (yellow card) 64'; Nordin (yellow card) 86'	Stadium: Stade Francis-Le Blé; Attendance: 13,248; Referee: Mikael Lesage

5 December 2021 17	Saint-Étienne	0–5	Rennes	Saint-Étienne
13:00 CET (UTC+1)	Camara (yellow card) 72'	Report	Terrier 21', 27', 47'; Maçon 44' (o.g.); Ugochukwu 82'	Stadium: Stade Geoffroy-Guichard; Attendance: 11,257; Referee: Thomas Léonard

11 December 2021 18	Reims	2–0	Saint-Étienne	Reims
21:00 CET (UTC+1)	Touré 23' (pen.); Mbuku 89'	Report		Stadium: Stade Auguste Delaune; Attendance: 12,019; Referee: Pierre Gaillouste

22 December 2021 19	Saint-Étienne	0–1	Nantes	Saint-Étienne
21:00 CET (UTC+1)	Moueffek (yellow card) 90+3'	Report	Castelletto (yellow card) 71'; Kolo Muani 83'	Stadium: Stade Geoffroy-Guichard; Attendance: 23,681; Referee: Clément Turpin

15 January 2022 21	Saint-Étienne	1–2	Lens	Saint-Étienne
17:00 CET (UTC+1)	Boudebouz 37'; Gabriel Silva (yellow card) 90'	Report	Gradit (yellow card) 30'; Sotoca 76'; Fofana 90+5'	Stadium: Stade Geoffroy-Guichard; Attendance: 5,000; Referee: François Letexier

21 January 2022 22	Lyon	1–0	Saint-Étienne	Décines-Charpieu
21:00 CET (UTC+1)	Dembélé 15' (pen.); Da Silva (yellow card) 59'	Report	Gourna-Douath (yellow card) 19'; Camara (yellow card) 42'; Maçon (yellow card) 50'; Thioub (yellow card) 90+1'	Stadium: Groupama Stadium; Attendance: 5,000; Referee: Antony Gautier

26 January 2022 20	Angers	0–1	Saint-Étienne	Angers
19:00 CET (UTC+1)	Mbock (yellow card) 89'	Report	Mendy 43' (o.g.); Camara (yellow card) 89'	Stadium: Stade Raymond Kopa; Attendance: 5,000; Referee: Clément Turpin

5 February 2022 23	Saint-Étienne	3–1	Montpellier	Saint-Étienne
17:00 CET (UTC+1)	Mangala (yellow card) 16'; Hamouma 82'; Nordin 90'; Khazri 90+3'	Report	Wahi 11'	Stadium: Stade Geoffroy-Guichard; Attendance: 20,000; Referee: Thomas Léonard

13 February 2022 24	Clermont	1–2	Saint-Étienne	Clermont-Ferrand
15:00 CET (UTC+1)	Hountondji (yellow card) 19', (goal) 39'; Gastien (yellow card) 52'; Seidu (yellow card) 90+1'; Zedadka (yellow card) 90+4'	Report	Boudebouz (yellow card) 15'; Camara 71'; Kolodziejczak 82'	Stadium: Stade Gabriel Montpied; Attendance: 12,131; Referee: Ruddy Buquet

20 February 2022 25	Saint-Étienne	2–2	Strasbourg	Saint-Étienne
15:00 CET (UTC+1)	Boudebouz 4'; Khazri 34'; Youssouf (yellow card) 45+1'; Kolodziejczak (yellow card) 50'; Mangala (yellow card) 90+4'	Report	Djiku (yellow card) 17'; Diallo 21'; Perrin 30', (yellow card) 66'	Stadium: Stade Geoffroy-Guichard; Attendance: 24,897; Referee: Antony Gautier

26 February 2022 26	Paris Saint-Germain	3–1	Saint-Étienne	Paris
21:00 CET (UTC+1)	Mbappé 42', 47'; Pereira 52'; Gueye (yellow card) 56'; Marquinhos (yellow card) 90'	Report	Mangala (yellow card) 9'; Bouanga 16'	Stadium: Parc des Princes; Attendance: 45,000; Referee: Pierre Gaillouste

6 March 2022 27	Saint-Étienne	1–0	Metz	Saint-Étienne
13:00 CET (UTC+1)	Bouanga (yellow card) 20', (goal) 52'; Gourna-Douath (yellow card) 62'; Nordin (yellow card) 74'	Report	De Préville (yellow card) 38'; Bronn (yellow card) 44'; Delaine (yellow card) 58'; Traoré (yellow card) 64'	Stadium: Stade Geoffroy-Guichard; Attendance: 35,706; Referee: Jérémy Stinat

11 March 2022 28	Lille	0–0	Saint-Étienne	Villeneuve-d'Ascq
21:00 CET (UTC+1)	Botman (yellow card) 64'	Report	Moukoudi (yellow card) 80'	Stadium: Stade Pierre-Mauroy; Attendance: 40,146; Referee: Florent Batta

18 March 2022 29	Saint-Étienne	1–1	Troyes	Saint-Étienne
21:00 CET (UTC+1)	Mangala (yellow card) 62'; Boudebouz 67' (pen.); Khazri (yellow card) 69'	Report	Mothiba 18'; Palmer-Brown (yellow card) 65'; Chavalerin (yellow card) 65'	Stadium: Stade Geoffroy-Guichard; Attendance: 32,193; Referee: Romain Lissorgue

3 April 2022 30	Saint-Étienne	2–4	Marseille	Saint-Étienne
15:00 CEST (UTC+2)	Bouanga 9'; Mangala (yellow card) 45+1'; Thioub (yellow card) 77'; Gourna-Douath 86'	Report	Payet 45+1' (pen.); Kolodziejczak 60' (o.g.); Dieng 68' (pen.); Harit 73'; Targhalline (yellow card) 88'	Stadium: Stade Geoffroy-Guichard; Attendance: 41,278; Referee: Clément Turpin
Note: The match was originally scheduled for 2 April 2022, but was postponed due to adverse weather conditions.

8 April 2022 31	Lorient	6–2	Saint-Étienne	Lorient
21:00 CEST (UTC+2)	Le Fée (yellow card) 29', (goal) 61'; Moffi 42' (pen.), 86', (yellow card) 87'; Koné 45+1', 65'; Boisgard 89'	Report	Bouanga 4'; Mangala (yellow card) 14'; Nordin 22'; Nadé (yellow card) 35'; Kolodziejczak (yellow card) 41'; Neyou (yellow card) 68' (yellow-red card) 68'	Stadium: Stade du Moustoir; Attendance: 15,407; Referee: Ruddy Buquet

16 April 2022 32	Saint-Étienne	2–1	Brest	Saint-Étienne
17:00 CEST (UTC+2)	Camara 14', 39'	Report	Honorat 8'; Pierre-Gabriel (yellow card) 74'; Belkebla (yellow card) 90+5'	Stadium: Stade Geoffroy-Guichard; Attendance: 27,227; Referee: Eric Wattellier

20 April 2022 33	Bordeaux	2–2	Saint-Étienne	Bordeaux
19:00 CEST (UTC+2)	Mara 16'; Onana (yellow card) 19', (goal) 23'; Ihnatenko (yellow card) 28'; Gregersen (yellow card) 52'; Ahmedhodžić (yellow card) 87'; Lacoux (yellow card) 90'	Report	Bouanga 33', (yellow card) 84'; Gourna-Douath (yellow card) 44'; Nordin 65', (yellow card) 71'; Khazri (yellow card) 84'; Camara (yellow card) 87'; Neyou (yellow card) 90+5'	Stadium: Matmut Atlantique; Attendance: 38,515; Referee: Benoît Bastien

23 April 2022 34	Saint-Étienne	1–4	Monaco	Saint-Étienne
19:00 CEST (UTC+2)	Khazri 42' (pen.), (yellow card) 42'; Mangala (yellow card) 73'	Report	Martins (yellow card) 20'; Ben Yedder 23'; Volland 26'; Tchouaméni (yellow card) 39'; Kolodziejczak 62' (o.g.); Sidibé (yellow card) 64'; Boadu 78'	Stadium: Stade Geoffroy-Guichard; Attendance: 30,018; Referee: Bastien Dechepy

30 April 2022 35	Rennes	2–0	Saint-Étienne	Rennes
21:00 CEST (UTC+2)	Majer 41', 84'; Martin (yellow card) 61'	Report	Trauco (yellow card) 61'; Nadé (yellow card) 65'; Gourna-Douath (yellow card) 67'; Maçon (yellow card) 70'	Stadium: Roazhon Park; Attendance: 27,390; Referee: Jérémy Stinat

11 May 2022 36	Nice	4–2	Saint-Étienne	Nice
19:00 CEST (UTC+2)	Daniliuc (yellow card) 44'; Bard 52'; Delort 60', 62'; Kluivert (yellow card) 65'; Boudaoui 80'	Report	Bouanga 11'; Maçon (yellow card) 37'; Youssouf 45+3'; Mangala (yellow card) 54'; Moukoudi (yellow card) 85'	Stadium: Allianz Riviera; Attendance: 17,704; Referee: Ruddy Buquet

14 May 2022 37	Saint-Étienne	1–2	Reims	Saint-Étienne
21:00 CEST (UTC+2)	Mangala (yellow card) 8', (goal) 12'	Report	Munetsi 2'; Doumbia 61'	Stadium: Stade Geoffroy-Guichard; Attendance: 0 Referee: Clément Turpin

21 May 2022 38	Nantes	1–1	Saint-Étienne	Nantes
21:00 CEST (UTC+2)	Blas 23' (pen.), (yellow card) 36'; Augustin (yellow card) 85'	Report	Hamouma 79'	Stadium: Stade de la Beaujoire; Attendance: 28,636; Referee: François Letexier

==== Relegation play-offs ====
26 May 2022 Play-off Final; First leg	Auxerre	1–1	Saint-Étienne	Auxerre
19:00 CEST (UTC+2)	Bernard (yellow card) 50'; Perrin 87'	Report	Youssouf 15'; Bouanga (yellow card) 59'	Stadium: Stade de l'Abbé-Deschamps; Attendance: 17,479; Referee: Benoît Millot

29 May 2022 Play-off Final; Second leg	Saint-Étienne	1–1 (a.e.t.) (2–2 agg.) (4–5 p)	Auxerre	Saint-Étienne
19:00 CEST (UTC+2)	Camara 76'	Report	Sakhi 51'; Touré (yellow card) 89'	Stadium: Stade Geoffroy-Guichard; Attendance: 24,489; Referee: Antony Gautier
	Penalties
	Boudebouz (penalty missed); Nordin (penalty scored); Trauco (penalty scored); Dioussé (penalty scored); Bouanga (penalty scored)		(penalty scored) Dugimont; (penalty scored) Jubal; (penalty scored) Perrin; (penalty scored) Charbonnier; (penalty scored) Touré

=== Coupe de France ===
19 December 2021 Round of 64	Lyon La Duchère	0–1	Saint-Étienne	Lyon
13:45 CET (UTC+1)	Ngwabije (yellow card) 67'; Negouai (yellow card) 81'; Oun (yellow card) 90+5'	Report	Nordin 32'; Sow (yellow card) 90+2'; Ramírez (yellow card) 90+6'	Stadium: Stade de Balmont; Attendance: 3,500; Referee: Benoît Millot

2 January 2022 Round of 32	Jura Sud	1–4	Saint-Étienne	Louhans
18:50 CET (UTC+1)	Tiago 78'	Report	Nadé 7', (yellow card) 71'; Nordin 13'; Sako 82' (pen.); Boudebouz 86'	Stadium: Stade du Bram; Attendance: 5,500; Referee: Bastien Dechepy

30 January 2022 Round of 16	Bergerac	1–0	Saint-Étienne	Périgueux
18:30 CET (UTC+1)	Ducros (yellow card) 30'; Escarpit 76'	Report		Stadium: Stade Francis-Rongiéras; Attendance: 3,676; Referee: Florent Batta

== Statistics ==
=== Goalscorers ===
As of 29 May 2022

Rank	Pos.	No.	Player	Ligue 1	Relegation play-offs	Coupe de France	Total
1	FW	10	(Tunisia) Wahbi Khazri	10	0	0	10
2	MF	20	(Gabon) Denis Bouanga	9	0	0	9
3	FW	18	(France) Arnaud Nordin	4	0	2	6
4	MF	7	(Algeria) Ryad Boudebouz	3	0	1	4
4	MF	8	(France) Mahdi Camara	3	1	0	4
6	FW	21	(France) Romain Hamouma	2	0	0	2
6	DF	5	(France) Timothée Kolodziejczak	2	0	0	2
6	DF	3	(France) Mickaël Nadé	1	0	1	2
6	DF	4	(Guinea) Saïdou Sow	2	0	0	2
6	MF	28	(France) Zaydou Youssouf	1	1	0	2
11	MF	6	(France) Lucas Gourna-Douath	1	0	0	1
11	FW	14	(Ivory Coast) Jean-Philippe Krasso	1	0	0	1
11	DF	22	(France) Eliaquim Mangala	1	0	0	1
11	FW	26	(Mali) Bakary Sako	0	0	1	1
11	DF	22	(Peru) Miguel Trauco	1	0	0	1
11	Own goals			1	0	0	1
Total				42	2	5	49
