= Stefan Bajić (footballer, born 2001) =

French footballer (born 1997)

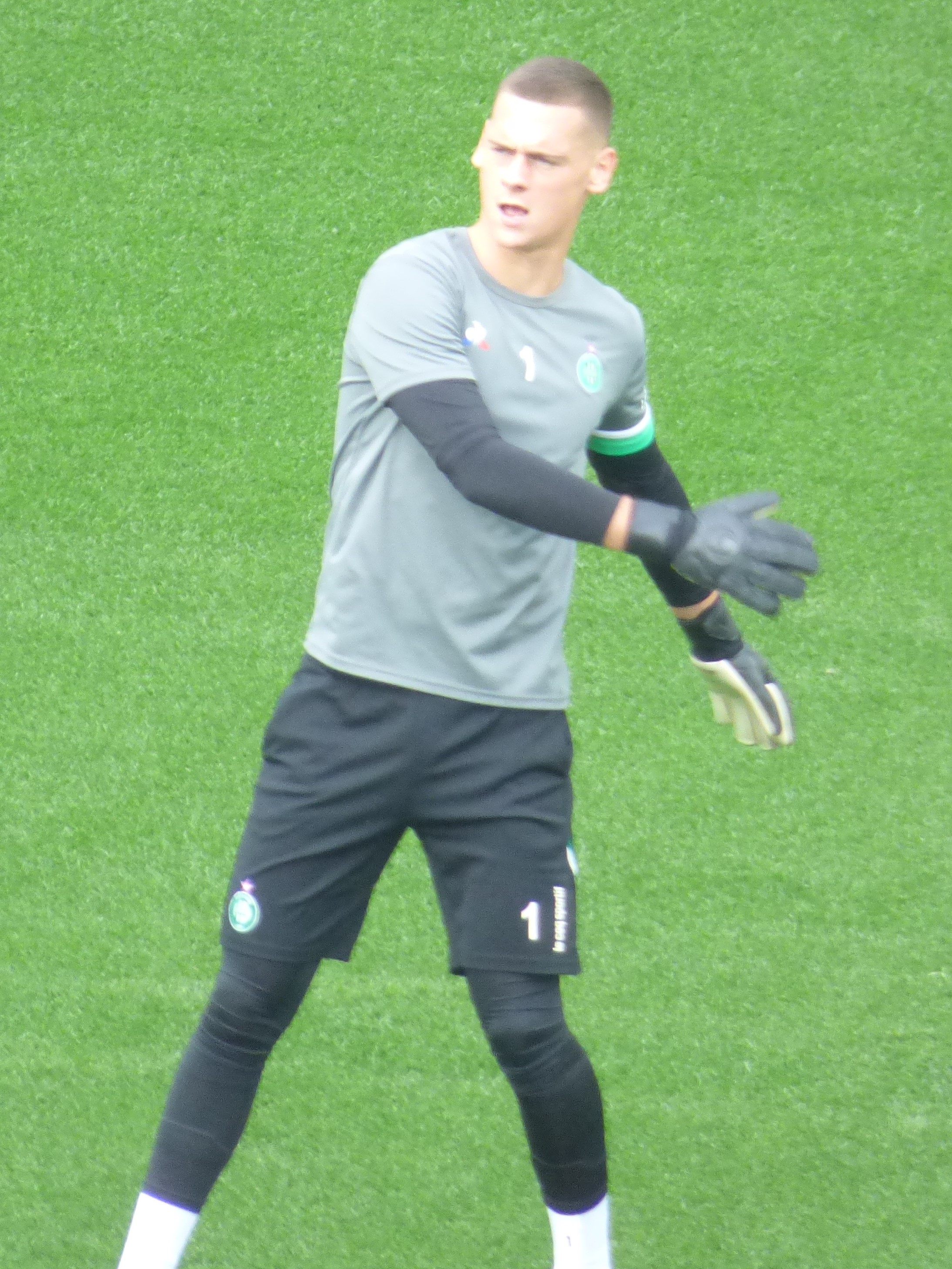
- Bajić with Saint-Étienne in 2020

Personal information
- Date of birth: 23 December 2001 (age 24)
- Place of birth: Saint-Étienne, France
- Height: 1.91 m (6 ft 3 in)
- Position: Goalkeeper

Team information
- Current team: Alemannia Aachen
- Number: 23

Youth career
- 2007–2019: Saint-Étienne

Senior career*
Years	Team	Apps	(Gls)
2018–2022	Saint-Étienne B	25	(0)
2019–2022	Saint-Étienne	9	(0)
2022	Pau	15	(0)
2022–2025	Bristol City	0	(0)
2023	→ Valenciennes (loan)	11	(0)
2025–2026	Strasbourg	0	(0)
2026–	Alemannia Aachen	0	(0)

International career^{‡}
2016–2017	France U16	7	(0)
2017–2018	France U17	3	(0)
2018	France U18	1	(0)
2019	France U19	11	(0)
2022	France U21	1	(0)
- * Club domestic league appearances and goals as of 17 May 2026 ‡ National team caps and goals as of 28 March 2022

Stefan Bajić (Serbian Cyrillic: Стефан Бајић; born 23 December 2001) is a French professional footballer who plays as a goalkeeper for German 3. Liga club Alemannia Aachen.

Bajić joined Saint-Étienne at age six, and over the years has climbed through the club's U17, U19 and reserve teams, breaking into the first team at age 18. He has represented France internationally at youth level, from the under-16s to the under-21s, as well as the Olympic team at the 2020 Summer Olympics.

== Early life ==
Bajić was born on 23 December 2001, in Saint-Étienne, France, and is of Serbian descent.

== Club career ==
=== Saint-Étienne ===
==== Youth system ====
Bajić first joined Saint-Étienne at age six, gradually progressing through the club's youth teams, before finding himself at the under-17 level. His performances in the Championnat National U17 earned him his first international call-up for the France national under-16 football team.

==== 2018–19 season ====
On 2 May 2018, Bajić signed his first professional contract, to the end of the 2020–21 season.

On 8 April 2019, Bajić extended his contract for a further year. Bajić also led the club's U19 team through its Coupe Gambardella campaign, which ended with a 2–0 victory over Toulouse's U19 side in the Final on 27 April.

==== 2019–20 season ====
After assistant coach Ghislain Printant took over from Gasset, Bajić became Saint-Étienne's third choice, surpassing Vermot. Bajić made his senior debut on 25 September 2019, with both Ruffier and Moulin suffering from minor injuries. The game against Metz resulted in Saint-Étienne's fourth defeat in five games, with a scoreline of 1–0. Bajić became the Greens' youngest-ever player to start a Ligue 1 match.

==== 2020–21 season ====
Bajić played in the Coupe de France fixture for the round of 64 on 11 February, against Sochaux, as Moulin felt discomfort in his hamstring, which Saint-Étienne lost 1–0. After Moulin also contracted the disease and later injured his groin, Bajić played his first league game in over a year on 19 March; Saint-Étienne lost 4–0 to Monaco.

=== Pau ===
On 4 February 2022, Bajić signed with Pau in Ligue 2.

=== Bristol City ===
On 5 July 2022, Bajić signed with Bristol City in the EFL Championship on a three-year deal.

On 19 January 2023, Bajić returned to France to join Valenciennes on loan until the end of the season.

Bajić was released from Bristol City on 1 July 2025.

=== Strasbourg ===
On 16 August 2025, Bajić signed a one-season contract with Strasbourg.

== International career ==
Bajić was called up to represent the France national under-19 team at the 2019 UEFA European Under-19 Championship.

== Career statistics ==
As of match played 13 August 2024

Appearances and goals by club, season and competition
Club	Season	League			National cup (Note: National competitions include the FA Cup and Coupe de France)		League cup (Note: League Cup competitions include the EFL Cup)		Other		Total	
Club	Season	Division	Apps	Goals	Apps	Goals	Apps	Goals	Apps	Goals	Apps	Goals
Saint-Étienne B	2018–19	Championnat National 2	14	0	—		—		—		14	0
Saint-Étienne B	2019–20	Championnat National 2	10	0	—		—		—		10	0
Saint-Étienne B	2021–22	Championnat National 3	1	0	—		—		—		1	0
Saint-Étienne B	Total		25	0	0	0	0	0	0	0	25	0
Saint-Étienne	2019–20	Ligue 1	1	0	0	0	0	0	0	0	1	0
Saint-Étienne	2020–21	Ligue 1	1	0	1	0	—		—		2	0
Saint-Étienne	2021–22	Ligue 1	7	0	2	0	—		—		9	0
Saint-Étienne	Total		9	0	3	0	0	0	0	0	12	0
Pau	2021–22	Ligue 2	15	0	0	0	—		—		15	0
Bristol City	2022–23	EFL Championship	0	0	0	0	1	0	—		1	0
Bristol City	2023–24	EFL Championship	0	0	0	0	0	0	—		0	0
Bristol City	2024–25	EFL Championship	0	0	0	0	1	0	—		1	0
Bristol City	Total		0	0	0	0	2	0	0	0	2	0
Valenciennes (loan)	2022–23	Ligue 2	11	0	0	0	—		—		11	0
Career total			60	0	3	0	2	0	0	0	65	0

== Honours ==
Saint-Étienne B

- Championnat National 3: 2017–18

Saint-Étienne U19

- Coupe Gambardella: 2018–19
