= 2026–27 MC Oran season =

MC Oran
2026–27 season
- Owner: Hyproc Shipping Company
- President: Hicham Guenad
- Manager: Tahar Chérif El-Ouazzani
- Stadium: Miloud Hadefi Stadium
- Ligue 1: 3rd
- Algerian Cup: Round of 64
- Top goalscorer: League: Abdelaziz Mouley (2 goals); All: Abdelaziz Mouley (2 goals)
- Highest home attendance: 25,000 v CR Témouchent; 11 September 2026 (Ligue 1)
- Average home league attendance: 25,000
- Biggest win: 2–0 v CR Témouchent; 11 August 2026 (Ligue 1)
Home colours	Away colours	Third colours

The 2026–27 season, is MC Oran's 61th season season and the club's 18th consecutive season in the top flight of Algerian football. In addition to the domestic league, MC Oran are participating in this season's editions of the Algerian Cup.

== Squad list ==
Players and squad numbers last updated on 31 August 2026.
Note: Flags indicate national team as has been defined under FIFA eligibility rules. Players may hold more than one non-FIFA nationality.

No.	Nat.	Name	Position	Date of Birth (Age)	Signed from
Goalkeepers
1	(Algeria)	Moustapha Zeghba	GK	21 November 1990 (aged 35)	(Algeria) CR Belouizdad
16	(Algeria)	Kamel Soufi	GK	5 June 1996 (aged 30)	(Algeria) MC Oran
30	(Algeria)	Mohammed Nouar	GK	1 October 2006 (aged 19)	(Algeria) Reserve team
Defenders
2	(Algeria)	Aymene Aid	RB	15 October 2006 (aged 19)	(Algeria) Reserve team
3	(Gabon)	Oumar Bagnama	CB	19 May 2001 (aged 25)	(Gabon) AS Mangasport
5	(Algeria)	Mouad Hadded	CB	22 February 1997 (aged 29)	(Kuwait) Kazma SC
12	(Algeria)	Oussama Kaddour	LB	12 May 1997 (aged 29)	(Algeria) USM Khenchela
15	(Algeria)	Abdelkader Belabbaci	CB	20 September 2006 (aged 19)	(Algeria) Reserve team
20	(Algeria)	Mokhtar Belkhiter (C.)	RB	15 January 1992 (aged 34)	(Algeria) ASO Chlef
22	(Algeria)	Houari Baouche	LB	24 December 1995 (aged 30)	(Algeria) CS Constantine
23	(Algeria)	Abderrahim Hamra	CB	21 July 1997 (aged 29)	(Algeria) ASO Chlef
24	(Algeria)	Ahmed Kerroum	CB	27 June 2000 (aged 26)	(Algeria) ASO Chlef
Midfielders
4	(Algeria)	Abderrahmane Bourdim	AM	14 June 1994 (aged 32)	(Algeria) ASO Chlef
6	(Algeria)	Omar Embarek	DM	11 November 1998 (aged 27)	(Algeria) USM Alger
8	(Algeria)	Juba Aguieb	AM	28 November 1996 (aged 29)	(Algeria) ASO Chlef
10	(Algeria)	Bilal Benkhedim	AM	20 April 2001 (aged 25)	(Luxembourg) F91 Dudelange
13	(Algeria)	Mortada Keniche	CM	24 April 2000 (aged 27)	(Algeria) MC El Bayadh
14	(Guinea)	Ousmane Coumbassa	DM	27 July 2001 (aged 25)	(Tunisia) ES Zarzis
17	(Algeria)	Chakib Aoudjane	CM	12 June 1996 (aged 30)	(Algeria) ES Mostaganem
18	(Algeria)	Mimoune Daho	CM	3 May 2006 (aged 20)	(Algeria) Reserve team
19	(Algeria)	Abdelouahab Morsli	DM	9 August 2006 (aged 20)	(Algeria) Reserve team
25	(Algeria)	Hadj Reda Ikhlef	AM	19 July 2006 (aged 20)	(Algeria) Reserve team
Forwards
7	(Gabon)	Edlin Essang-Matouti	ST	25 July 2003 (aged 24)	(Algeria) USM Khenchela
9	(Algeria)	Yacine Goudjil	ST	26 June 2005 (aged 21)	(Algeria) Reserve team
11	(Mali)	Boubacar Traoré	ST	14 December 1999 (aged 26)	(Libya) Al-Ahly
21	(Algeria)	Abdelaziz Mouley	RW	20 April 1999 (aged 28)	(Algeria) ES Sétif
26	(Algeria)	Ismail Saadi	LW	4 April 1997 (aged 30)	(Algeria) JS Saoura
27	(Algeria)	Yacine Aliane	LW	28 August 1999 (aged 27)	(Algeria) ASO Chlef
28	(Algeria)	Ahmed Ghennam	ST	31 March 1998 (aged 29)	(Algeria) CR Témouchent
29	(Algeria)	Mounir Mahadene	RW	3 April 2005 (aged 22)	(Algeria) Reserve team

== Transfers ==
=== In ===
==== Summer ====
Date	Pos	Player	Moving from	Fee	Source
30 June 2026	LB	(Algeria) Houari Baouche	CS Constantine	Free transfer	
30 June 2026	LW	(Algeria) Ismail Saadi	JS Saoura	Free transfer	
30 June 2026	ST	(Algeria) Ahmed Ghennam	CR Témouchent	Free transfer	
30 June 2026	ST	(Gabon) Edlin Essang-Matouti	USM Khenchela	Free transfer	
13 July 2026	GK	(Algeria) Kamel Soufi	USM Alger	Free transfer	
13 July 2026	CM	(Algeria) Mortada Keniche	MC El Bayadh	Free transfer	
19 July 2026	CB	(Algeria) Mouad Hadded	(Kuwait) Kazma SC	Free transfer	
2 August 2026	CB	(Gabon) Oumar Bagnama	(Gabon) AS Mangasport	Free transfer	

=== Out ===
==== Summer ====
Date	Pos	Player	Moving to	Fee	Source
10 June 2026	RB	(Algeria) Abdelkader Belharrane	Olympique Akbou	Free transfer	
19 June 2026	LB	(Algeria) Abdelkarim Mammar	Unattached	Free transfer (Released)	
9 July 2026	GK	(Algeria) Mokhtar Ferrahi	Unattached	Free transfer (Released)	
9 July 2026	LW	(Guinea) Sékou Damaro Bangoura	Unattached	Free transfer (Released)	
9 July 2026	DM	(Botswana) Gape Mohutsiwa	Unattached	Free transfer (Released)	
21 July 2026	CB	(Algeria) Kelyan Guessoum	Unattached	Free transfer (Released)	
22 July 2026	CB	(Algeria) Ibrahim Hachoud	USM Khenchela	Free transfer	
23 July 2026	LW	(Algeria) Ilyes Miloudi	Unattached	Free transfer (Released)	
2 August 2026	DM	(Algeria) Oussama Fatmi	Unattached	Free transfer (Released)	
14 August 2026	CB	(Algeria) Faiz Amem	JS El Biar	Free transfer	

=== New contracts ===
No.	Pos	Player	Contract length	Contract end	Date	Source
8	AM	Juba Aguieb	2 years	2029	8 May 2026	
1	GK	Moustapha Zeghba	1 year	2028	16 July 2026	
6	DM	Omar Embarek	1 year	2028	16 July 2026	
20	RB	Mokhtar Belkhiter	1 year	2028	16 July 2026	
17	CM	Chakib Aoudjane	2 years	2029	16 July 2026	
4	AM	Abderrahmane Bourdim	1 year	2028	16 July 2026	

== Pre-season and friendlies ==
MC Oran announced a pre-season preparation in Turkey with friendlies against the two Qatari clubs Al-Markhiya SC and Muaither SC and the Saudi club Al Raed in Derince, Turkey scheduled.

Win Draw Loss Fixtures

26 July 2026 Friendly	MC Oran	2–1	Al-Markhiya SC	Derince, Turkey
15:00 TRT	Mouley; Bourdim		Cola 67'	Stadium: Derince Belediye Stadium

28 July 2026 Friendly	MC Oran	3–0	Muaither SC	Derince, Turkey
15:00 TRT	Traoré; Benkhedim; Aliane			Stadium: Derince Belediye Stadium

30 July 2026 Friendly	Eyüpspor	0–1	MC Oran	Derince, Turkey
17:00 TRT			Saadi	Stadium: Derince Belediye Stadium

3 August 2026 Friendly	MC Oran	1–1	Al Raed	Derince, Turkey
15:00 TRT	Traoré			Stadium: Derince Belediye Stadium

17 August 2026 Friendly	MC Oran	2–2	GC Mascara	Bir El Djir
17:30 GMT/UTC	Ghenam; Traoré		Benayad (pen.); Ghali 88' (pen.)	Stadium: Miloud Hadefi Stadium - Annex 1

20 August 2026 Friendly	MC Oran	4–0	JRB Taghit	Bir El Djir
17:30 GMT/UTC	Ghenam; Kerroum (pen.); Benkhedim			Stadium: Miloud Hadefi Stadium - Annex 1

30 August 2026 Friendly	MC Oran	3–0	CA Sidi Abdelmoumen	Bir El Djir
18:00 GMT/UTC	Traoré; Saadi			Stadium: Miloud Hadefi Stadium - Annex 1

31 August 2026 Friendly	MC Oran	1–1	MC Saida	Bir El Djir
17:00 GMT/UTC	Ghennam			Stadium: Miloud Hadefi Stadium - Annex 1

29 September 2026 Friendly	MC Oran	3–0	JS Djeniene Meskine	Bir El Djir
17:00 GMT/UTC	Hadded; Traoré; Ghennam			Stadium: Miloud Hadefi Stadium - Annex 1

1 October 2026 Friendly	MC Oran	7–0	JSM Tlemcen	Bir El Djir
17:00 GMT/UTC	Aoudjane; Aliane; Ghennam; Traoré; Mouley			Stadium: Miloud Hadefi Stadium - Annex 1

== Competitions ==
=== Overview ===
Competition	Record								Started round	Final position / round	First match	Last match
Competition	G	W	D	L	GF	GA	GD	Win %	Started round	Final position / round	First match	Last match
Ligue 1	9	5	3	1	8	3	+5	55.56	—N/a	To be confirmed	11 September 2026	In Progress
Algerian Cup	0	0	0	0	0	0	+0	—	Round of 64	To be confirmed	December 2026	In Progress
Total	9	5	3	1	8	3	+5	55.56				

Updated to match played 20 November 2026
Source: Competitions

=== Ligue 1 ===
==== League table ====
Pos	Team	Pld	W	D	L	GF	GA	GD	Pts	Qualification or relegation
1	JS Kabylie	9	6	2	1	13	3	+10	20	Qualification for CAF Champions League
2	CR Belouizdad	9	6	2	1	13	8	+5	20	Qualification for CAF Champions League
3	MC Oran	9	5	3	1	8	3	+5	18	Qualification for CAF Confederation Cup
4	MB Rouissat	10	5	3	2	10	6	+4	18	
5	MC Alger	8	5	1	2	9	3	+6	16	

Updated to match(es) played on 20 November 2026. Source: lfp.dz
Rules for classification: 1) Points; 2) Head-to-head points; 3) Head-to-head goal difference; 4) First half goal difference; 5) First half total goals; 6) Fairplay ranking; 7) Playoff.

==== Results summary ====
Overall								Home						Away					
Pld	W	D	L	GF	GA	GD	Pts	W	D	L	GF	GA	GD	W	D	L	GF	GA	GD
9	5	3	1	8	3	+5	18	3	2	0	6	1	+5	2	1	1	2	2	0

Last updated: 20 November 2026.
Source: Competitive matches

==== Results by round ====
Round	1	2	3	4	5	6	7	8	9	10	11	12	13	14	15	16	17	18	19	20	21	22	23	24	25	26	27	28	29	30
Ground	A	H	A	H	A	H	A	H	A	H	A	H	A	A	H	H	A	H	A	H	A	H	A	H	A	H	A	H	H	A
Result	L	W	W	D	W	W	D	D		W																				
Position																														

Updated to match(es) played on 20 November 2026. Source: Competitive matches
A = Away; H = Home; W = Win; D = Draw; L = Loss

==== Matches ====
The league fixtures were announced on 3 August 2026.

All times are local, WAT (UTC+1).

Win Draw Loss Postponed

11 September 2026 Round 2	MC Oran	2–0	CR Témouchent	Bir El Djir
19:00	Aoudjane (yellow card) 7'; Aguieb (yellow card) 59'; Kerroum 81' (pen.); Bourdim 90+2'	Flashscore; LFP	Baaziz (yellow card) 19'; Freifer (yellow card) 35'; Bouziane (yellow card) 45+2'; Itim (yellow card) 68'; Safaga (red card) 84'	Stadium: Miloud Hadefi Stadium; Attendance: 25.000; Referee: Mehdi Oukil; VAR: Lahlou Benbraham

18 September 2026 Round 3	ASO Chlef	0–1	MC Oran	Chlef
21:00		Flashscore; LFP	Saadi 75'	Stadium: Mohamed Boumezrag Stadium; Attendance: 0 (close doors); Referee: Anes Azrine; VAR: Fateh Harkat

8 October 2026 Round 4	MC Oran	0–0	ES Sétif	Bir El Djir
20:00		Flashscore; LFP		Stadium: Miloud Hadefi Stadium; Referee: Ayoub Belhachemi; VAR: Akram Mechairia

13 October 2026 Round 5	US Biskra	0–1	MC Oran	Zeribet El Oued
15:00		Flashscore; LFP	Mouley 76'	Stadium: Bouhafs Chabi Stadium; Referee: Lahlou Benbraham

17 October 2026 Round 6	MC Oran	1–0	USM Khenchela	Bir El Djir
19:00	Mouley 64'	Flashscore; LFP		Stadium: Miloud Hadefi Stadium; Referee: Abderrahmane Mohamed Belkebir; VAR: Mohamed Rafik Aouina

23 October 2026 Round 7	JS El Biar	0–0	MC Oran	Dar El Beïda
15:15		Flashscore; LFP		Stadium: Omar Benrabah Stadium; Referee: Akram Mechairia; VAR: Mehdi Oukil

30 October 2026 Round 8	MC Oran	0–0	Olympique Akbou	Bir El Djir
20:00		Flashscore; LFP		Stadium: Miloud Hadefi Stadium; Referee: Mehdi Oukil; VAR: Haitham Ghouti

4 November 2026 Round 1	MC Alger	2–0	MC Oran	Douéra
20:00	Ghezala 24' (pen.), 89'	Flashscore; LFP		Stadium: Ali La Pointe Stadium; Attendance: 0 (close doors); Referee: Lahlou Benbraham; VAR: Abderahmane Sahraoui

20 November 2026 Round 10	MC Oran	3–1	JS Saoura	Bir El Djir
20:00	Traoré 5'; Benkhedim 45+5'; Kerroum 90+6'	Flashscore; LFP	Fettouhi 58'	Stadium: Miloud Hadefi Stadium; Referee: Haitham Ghouti; VAR: Ghada Mehat

1 December 2026 Round 11	ES Ben Aknoun	–	MC Oran	Belouizdad
17:00		Flashscore; LFP		Stadium: 20 August 1955 Stadium

Round 9	USM Alger	–	MC Oran	Algiers
:		Flashscore; LFP		Stadium: Stade du 5 Juillet

Round 12	MC Oran	–	CR Belouizdad	Bir El Djir
--:--		Flashscore; LFP		Stadium: Miloud Hadefi Stadium

Round 13	CS Constantine	–	MC Oran	Constantine
--:--		Flashscore; LFP		Stadium: Chahid Hamlaoui Stadium

Round 14	MB Rouissat	–	MC Oran	Ouargla
--:--		Flashscore; LFP		Stadium: 18 February Stadium

Round 15	MC Oran	–	JS Kabylie	Bir El Djir
--:--		Flashscore; LFP		Stadium: Miloud Hadefi Stadium

Round 16	MC Oran	–	MC Alger	Bir El Djir
--:--		Flashscore; LFP		Stadium: Miloud Hadefi Stadium

Round 17	CR Témouchent	–	MC Oran	Aïn Témouchent
--:--		Flashscore; LFP		Stadium: Omar Oucief Stadium

Round 18	MC Oran	–	ASO Chlef	Bir El Djir
--:--		Flashscore; LFP		Stadium: Miloud Hadefi Stadium

Round 19	ES Sétif	–	MC Oran	Sétif
--:--		Flashscore; LFP		Stadium: 8 May 1945 Stadium

Round 20	MC Oran	–	US Biskra	Bir El Djir
--:--		Flashscore; LFP		Stadium: Miloud Hadefi Stadium

Round 21	USM Khenchela	–	MC Oran	Khenchela
--:--		Flashscore; LFP		Stadium: Amar Hamam Stadium

Round 22	MC Oran	–	JS El Biar	Bir El Djir
--:--		Flashscore; LFP		Stadium: Miloud Hadefi Stadium

Round 23	Olympique Akbou	–	MC Oran	Akbou
--:--		Flashscore; LFP		Stadium: Martyrs Stadium

Round 24	MC Oran	–	USM Alger	Bir El Djir
--:--		Flashscore; LFP		Stadium: Miloud Hadefi Stadium

Round 25	JS Saoura	–	MC Oran	Béchar
--:--		Flashscore; LFP		Stadium: 20 August 1955 Stadium

Round 26	MC Oran	–	ES Ben Aknoun	Bir El Djir
--:--		Flashscore; LFP		Stadium: Miloud Hadefi Stadium

Round 27	CR Belouizdad	–	MC Oran	Baraki
--:--		Flashscore; LFP		Stadium: Nelson Mandela Stadium

Round 28	MC Oran	–	CS Constantine	Bir El Djir
--:--		Flashscore; LFP		Stadium: Miloud Hadefi Stadium

Round 29	MC Oran	–	MB Rouissat	Bir El Djir
--:--		Flashscore; LFP		Stadium: Miloud Hadefi Stadium

Round 30	JS Kabylie	–	MC Oran	Tizi Ouzou
--:--		Flashscore; LFP		Stadium: Hocine Aït Ahmed Stadium

=== Algerian Cup ===
December 2026 Round of 64	–
:

== Squad information ==
=== Appearances and goals ===
As of 20 November 2026

No.	Pos	Player	Nat	Ligue 1			Algerian Cup			Total		
No.	Pos	Player	Nat	App	St	G	App	St	G	App	St	G
Goalkeepers
1	GK	Moustapha Zeghba	(Algeria)	9	9	0	0	0	0	0	0	0
16	GK	Kamel Soufi	(Algeria)	0	0	0	0	0	0	0	0	0
30	GK	Mohammed Nouar	(Algeria)	0	0	0	0	0	0	0	0	0
Defenders
2	RB	Aymene Aid	(Algeria)	0	0	0	0	0	0	0	0	0
3	CB	Oumar Bagnama	(Gabon)	2	0	0	0	0	0	0	0	0
5	CB	Mouad Hadded	(Algeria)	9	9	0	0	0	0	0	0	0
12	LB	Oussama Kaddour	(Algeria)	6	6	0	0	0	0	0	0	0
15	CB	Abdelkader Belabbaci	(Algeria)	0	0	0	0	0	0	0	0	0
20	RB	Mokhtar Belkhiter	(Algeria)	9	9	0	0	0	0	0	0	0
22	LB	Houari Baouche	(Algeria)	5	3	0	0	0	0	0	0	0
23	CB	Abderrahim Hamra	(Algeria)	6	6	0	0	0	0	0	0	0
24	CB	Ahmed Kerroum	(Algeria)	5	3	2	0	0	0	0	0	0
Midfielders
4	AM	Abderrahmane Bourdim	(Algeria)	7	1	1	0	0	0	0	0	0
6	DM	Omar Embarek	(Algeria)	9	8	0	0	0	0	0	0	0
8	AM	Juba Aguieb	(Algeria)	8	6	0	0	0	0	0	0	0
10	AM	Bilal Benkhedim	(Algeria)	3	2	1	0	0	0	0	0	0
13	CM	Mortada Keniche	(Algeria)	3	1	0	0	0	0	0	0	0
14	DM	Ousmane Coumbassa	(Guinea)	9	6	0	0	0	0	0	0	0
17	AM	Chakib Aoudjane	(Algeria)	7	3	0	0	0	0	0	0	0
18	CM	Mimoune Daho	(Algeria)	0	0	0	0	0	0	0	0	0
19	DM	Abdelouahab Morsli	(Algeria)	0	0	0	0	0	0	0	0	0
25	AM	Hadj Reda Ikhlef	(Algeria)	0	0	0	0	0	0	0	0	0
Forwards
7	ST	Edlin Essang-Matouti	(Rwanda)	6	4	0	0	0	0	0	0	0
9	ST	Yacine Goudjil	(Algeria)	0	0	0	0	0	0	0	0	0
11	ST	Boubacar Traoré	(Mali)	4	3	1	0	0	0	0	0	0
21	RW	Abdelaziz Mouley	(Algeria)	9	7	2	0	0	0	0	0	0
26	LW	Ismail Saadi	(Algeria)	9	8	1	0	0	0	0	0	0
27	LW	Yacine Aliane	(Algeria)	6	1	0	0	0	0	0	0	0
28	ST	Ahmed Ghennam	(Algeria)	7	4	0	0	0	0	0	0	0
29	RW	Mounir Mehdi Mahadene	(Algeria)	1	0	0	0	0	0	0	0	0
Total				9		8	0		0	0		0

Last updated: 20 November 2026
Source: soccerway.com

=== Goalscorers ===
As of 20 November 2026

Includes all competitive matches. Includes all competitive matches.

No.	Nat.	Player	Pos.	L1	AC	TOTAL
21	(Algeria)	Aziz Mouley	RW	2	0	2
24	(Algeria)	Ahmed Kerroum	CB	2	0	2
4	(Algeria)	Abderrahmane Bourdim	AM	1	0	1
10	(Algeria)	Bilal Benkhedim	AM	1	0	1
26	(Algeria)	Ismail Saadi	LW	1	0	1
11	(Mali)	Boubacar Traoré	ST	1	0	1
Own Goals				0	0	0
Totals				8	0	8

=== Assists ===
As of 20 November 2026

Includes all competitive matches. Includes all competitive matches.

No.	Nat.	Player	Pos.	L1	AC	TOTAL
14	(Guinea)	Ousmane Coumbassa	DM	2	0	2
20	(Algeria)	Mokhtar Belkhiter	RB	1	0	1
4	(Algeria)	Abderrahmane Bourdim	AM	1	0	1
Totals				4	0	4

=== Clean sheets ===
As of 20 November 2026

Includes all competitive matches.

					Clean sheets		
No.	Nat	Name	GP	GA	L1	AC	TOTAL
1	(Algeria)	Moustapha Zeghba	9	3	7	0	7
16	(Algeria)	Kamel Soufi	0	0	0	0	0
30	(Algeria)	Mohammed Nouar	0	0	0	0	0
Totals				3	7	0	7
