= Guy Mipamb Nahm-Tchougli =

Togolese Magistrate and Academic

Minister of Justice and Legislation, Keeper of the Seals
- In office January 16, 2025 – October 8, 2025
- President: Faure Gnassingbé
- Preceded by: Pius Agbetomey
- Succeeded by: Pacôme Yawovi Adjourouvi

Personal details
- Education: University of Lomé
- Profession: Magistrate, academic

Guy Mipamb Nahm-Tchougli is a Togolese magistrate and academic. He served as Minister of Justice and Legislation, Keeper of the Seals, from January to October 2025.

== Academic and professional background ==
A lawyer by training, Nahm-Tchougli is a professor of law at the University of Lomé. Before joining the government, he served as a judge at the Constitutional Court of Togo.

== Appointment to government ==
On 16 January 2025, Nahm-Tchougli was appointed Minister of Justice and Legislation, Keeper of the Seals, by presidential decree signed by President Faure Essozimna Gnassingbé. He succeeded Kokouvi Pius Agbetomey, who had held the position since 2015.This appointment formed part of the 2020–2025 governmental roadmap for the modernization of the judicial system.

== Actions and reforms ==
During his tenure, Nahm-Tchougli carried out several inspection visits to judicial institutions across the country, including the court of Tsévié, to assess service performance and curb irregular practices in the handling of land disputes. He also announced several reform measures aimed at:

- Strengthening judicial staff,
- Upgrading the Tsévié court to a high court,
- Combating unauthorized middlemen in the courts, and
- Improving transparency and integrity within the justice system.

These actions aligned with the government’s goal of bringing justice closer to citizens and enhancing its effectiveness.

== End of tenure ==
On 8 October 2025, Pacôme Yawovi Adjourouvi succeeded him as Minister of Justice and Human Rights following the formation of a new government under the Fifth Republic (1992) led by President Faure Gnassingbé.
