= Kokou Tozoun =

Togolese politician

Kokou Biossey Tozoun is a Togolese politician who was Minister of Justice from 2007 to March 2011.

== Career ==
After serving as Minister of the Civil Service, Work and Employment, Tozoun was appointed Minister of Foreign Affairs and Cooperation in the government named on July 29, 2003. He was Foreign Minister for two years before being appointed Minister of Communication and Civic Education in the government named on June 20, 2005. At the 2006 Inter-Togolese Dialogue, Tozoun signed the Global Political Accord on the electoral process on behalf of the government on August 20, 2006. He was dismissed from the government in September 2006, when a national unity government was formed.

Tozoun served as Rapporteur of the National Independent Electoral Commission (CENI) at the time of the October 2007 parliamentary election. Following the election, he was appointed Minister of Justice in the government of Prime Minister Komlan Mally, named on December 13, 2007.

He is a member of the Central Committee of the Rally of the Togolese People (RPT) from Moyen-Mono Prefecture as of the party's Ninth Ordinary Congress in December 2006.

When the National Assembly unanimously voted to abolish the death penalty in June 2009, Tozoun described it as "the best decision that we took in this year".
