= Tchitchao Tchalim =

Togolese barrister

Tchitchao Tchalim is a Togolese barrister. He was the Togolese Minister of Justice from 2011 to 2014.
