= Miguel Trauco =

Peruvian footballer (born 1992)

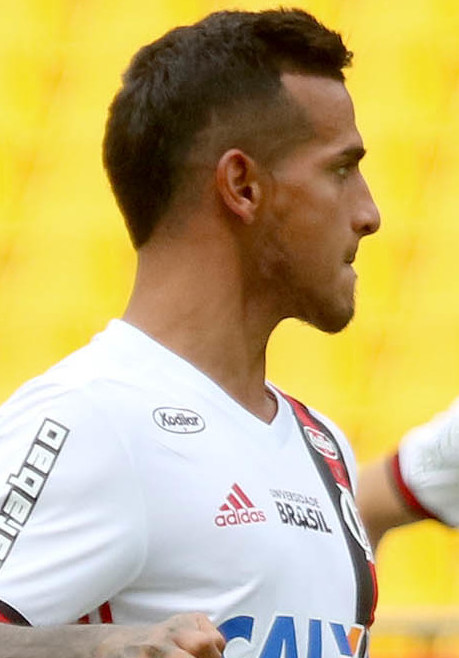
- Trauco playing for Flamengo in 2018

Personal information
- Full name: Miguel Ángel Trauco Saavedra
- Date of birth: 25 August 1992 (age 34)
- Place of birth: Tarapoto, Peru
- Height: 1.69 m (5 ft 7 in)
- Positions: Left-back; left midfielder

Team information
- Current team: Sport Boys
- Number: 47

Senior career*
Years	Team	Apps	(Gls)
2010–2016	Unión Comercio	162	(3)
2016	Universitario	39	(1)
2017–2019	Flamengo	34	(1)
2019–2022	Saint-Étienne	62	(2)
2020–2022	Saint-Étienne B	2	(0)
2022–2023	San Jose Earthquakes	30	(3)
2024–2025	Criciúma	32	(2)
2025	Alianza Lima	29	(0)
2026–	Sport Boys	0	(0)

International career^{‡}
2014–	Peru	76	(0)
Medal record
Men's football
Representing Peru
Copa América
Runner-up	2019 Brazil
- * Club domestic league appearances and goals as of 29 December 2025 ‡ National team caps and goals as of 23:22, 20 March 2025 (UTC)

Miguel Ángel Trauco Saavedra (born 25 August 1992) is a Peruvian professional footballer who plays as a left-back or left midfielder for Sport Boys the Peru national team.

Trauco is a defender known for his technical ability, passing, and dribbling. Tactically he operates as a two-way player, frequently advancing up the pitch to participate in his team's offensive plays while maintaining his defensive responsibilities.

== Early life ==
Trauco was born in Tarapoto; he is the son of Miguel Trauco Alvarado and Bessy Saavedra Armas.

== Club career ==
Trauco started his career in the Copa Perú division with Unión Comercio in 2010. He made six appearances in the National Stage that season including the two matches against Alianza Unicachi in the Final. His side won on away goals and were promoted to the First Division the following season. In 2016, he signed for Universitario de Deportes.

In October 2016 Brazilian and Peruvian press reported rumors about Flamengo's possible interest for signing Trauco. Shortly after, on 13 December 2016, Trauco gave an interview to Peruvian newspaper Libero confirming his transfer to Flamengo for the 2017 season. However, the Brazilian club did not confirm any signing, saying they are still negotiating with Trauco.

Trauco was elected 2016 Peruvian Primera División best player with 39 appearances, one goal and 11 assists.

=== Flamengo ===
After many rumors in the press Flamengo announced officially Traucos's signing, on 14 December 2016. He signed a three-year contract with the Brazilian club. He debuted for his new club on 28 January 2017 scoring a goal and two assists against Boavista, in the opening match of the 2017 Campeonato Carioca.

After Flamengo signed Filipe Luís Trauco lost space and became the team's third left back. As he only had five more months under his contract the Brazilian club decided to accept a low offer from Saint-Étienne to avoid losing Trauco on a free transfer.

=== Saint-Étienne ===
On 31 July 2019, Flamengo announced that they would accept a €600,000 offer for Trauco from Ligue 1 club Saint-Étienne.

=== San Jose Earthquakes ===
On 2 September 2022, Trauco signed with Major League Soccer side San Jose Earthquakes on a one-and-a-half-year deal.

== International career ==
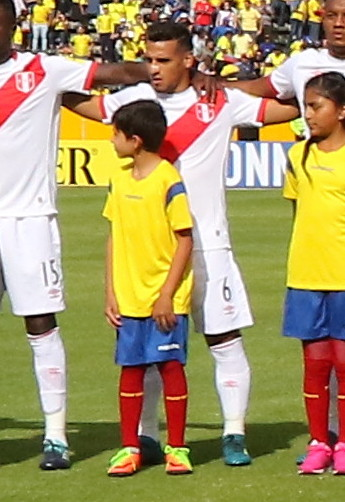
Trauco playing for Peru national team in 2017

Trauco debuted for the Peru national team on 6 August 2014 as a substitute in a 3–0 win against Panama. He also appeared as a substitute in a match against Iran on 4 September 2014.

He returned to the national team in 2016 and has been a fixture at left-back ever since. He started in all thirteen of his appearances in 2018 FIFA World Cup qualifying matches between 2016 and 2017, including Peru's intercontinental playoff victory against New Zealand which qualified Peru for their first FIFA World Cup since 1982.

=== Copa América Centenario ===
On 17 May 2016, Trauco was named to the Peru national team for the Copa América Centenario in the United States. He started all four matches for Peru as they won their group, but missed his penalty in a shootout loss to Colombia in the quarter-finals.

=== 2018 FIFA World Cup ===
On 14 May 2018, Trauco was named to the Peru national team for the 2018 World Cup in Russia. He started all three matches for the squad in the group stage.

=== 2019 Copa América ===
On 30 May 2019, Trauco was named to the Peru national team for the 2019 Copa América in Brazil by manager Ricardo Gareca. He started all six matches for Peru throughout the tournament, including the final on 7 July, which ended in a 3–1 defeat to hosts Brazil. For his performances, Trauco was named to the Team of the Tournament by CONMEBOL.

== Career statistics ==
=== Club ===
As of match played 25 August 2025

Appearances and goals by club, season and competition
Club	Season	League			Cup		Continental		Other		Total	
Club	Season	Division	Apps	Goals	Apps	Goals	Apps	Goals	Apps	Goals	Apps	Goals
Unión Comercio	2011	Peruvian Primera División	22	2	—		—		—		22	2
Unión Comercio	2012	Peruvian Primera División	43	0	—		2 (Note: Appearance(s) in Copa Sudamericana)	0	—		45	0
Unión Comercio	2013	Peruvian Primera División	40	0	—		—		—		40	0
Unión Comercio	2014	Peruvian Primera División	27	0	12	0	—		—		39	0
Unión Comercio	2015	Peruvian Primera División	30	1	8	1	2	0	—		40	2
Unión Comercio	Total		162	3	20	1	4	0	—		186	4
Universitario	2016	Peruvian Primera División	39	1	—		2	0	—		41	1
Flamengo	2017	Campeonato Brasileiro Série A	23	1	4	0	13 (Note: Six appearances and two goals in Copa Libertadores, seven appearances in Copa Sudamericana)	2	13 (Note: Twelve appearances and one goal in Campeonato Carioca, one appearance in Primeira Liga)	1	53	4
Flamengo	2018	Campeonato Brasileiro Série A	6	0	1	0	0	0	3 (Note: Appearance(s) in Campeonato Carioca)	0	10	0
Flamengo	2019	Campeonato Brasileiro Série A	5	0	0	0	2 (Note: Appearance(s) in Copa Libertadores)	0	5	0	12	0
Flamengo	Total		34	1	5	0	15	2	21	1	75	4
Saint-Étienne	2019–20	Ligue 1	19	1	2	0	1 (Note: Appearance(s) in UEFA Europa League)	0	2 (Note: Appearances in the Coupe de la Ligue)	0	24	1
Saint-Étienne	2020–21	Ligue 1	26	0	1	0	—		—		27	0
Saint-Étienne	2021–22	Ligue 1	17	1	2	0	—		2 (Note: Appearances in the Ligue 1 relegation/promotion play-offs)	0	21	1
Saint-Étienne	Total		62	2	5	0	1	0	4	0	72	2
Saint-Étienne B	2020–21	Championnat National 3	1	0	—		—		—		1	0
Saint-Étienne B	2021–22	Championnat National 3	1	0	—		—		—		1	0
Saint-Étienne B	Total		2	0	—		—		—		2	0
San Jose Earthquakes	2022	Major League Soccer	3	0	0	0	—		—		3	0
San Jose Earthquakes	2023	Major League Soccer	27	3	1	0	—		3 (Note: Appearances in Leagues Cup and MLS Cup Playoffs)	0	31	3
San Jose Earthquakes	Total		30	3	1	0	—		3	0	34	3
Criciúma	2024	Série A	24	2	4	0	—		8 (Note: Appearances in Campeonato Catarinense)	0	36	2
Alianza Lima	2025	Peruvian Primera División	18	0	0	0	14 (Note: Ten appearances in Copa Libertadores, four appearance in Copa Sudamericana)	0	—		26	0
Career total			371	12	35	1	36	2	36	1	478	16

=== International ===
As of match played 20 March 2025

Appearances and goals by national team and year
National team	Year	Apps	Goals
Peru	2014	2	0
Peru	2015	0	0
Peru	2016	10	0
Peru	2017	10	0
Peru	2018	13	0
Peru	2019	15	0
Peru	2020	4	0
Peru	2021	9	0
Peru	2022	5	0
Peru	2023	6	0
Peru	2024	1	0
Peru	2025	1	0
Total		76	0

== Honours ==
Unión Comercio

- Copa Perú: 2010

Universitario

- Peruvian Primera División: Apertura 2016

Flamengo

- Campeonato Carioca: 2017, 2019
- Campeonato Brasileiro: 2019
- Copa Libertadores: 2019

Saint-Étienne

- Coupe de France runner-up: 2019–20

Individual

- Peruvian Primera División Player of the Year: 2016
- Campeonato Carioca Team of the Year: 2017
- Copa América Team of the Tournament: 2019
