= Harold Moukoudi =

Footballer (born 1997)

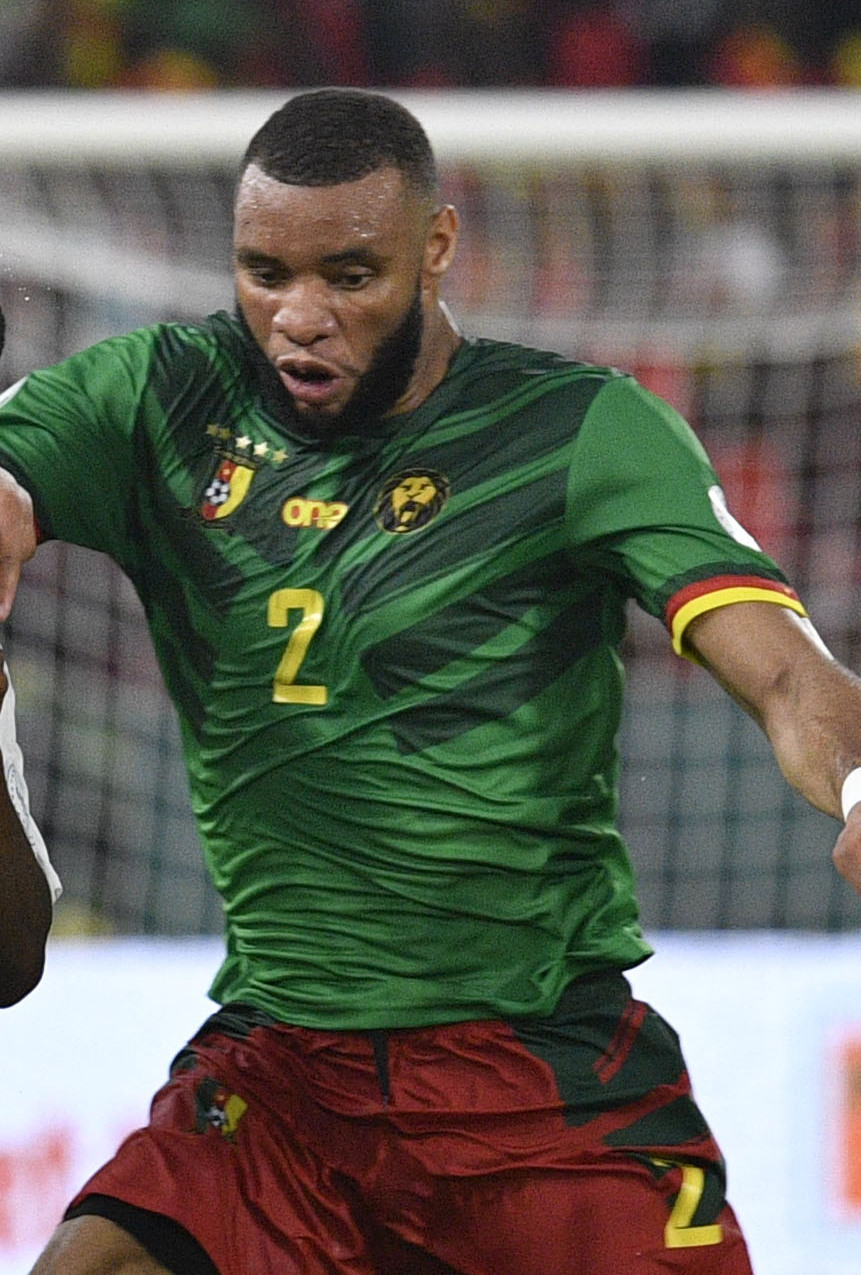
- Moukoudi with Cameroon at the 2023 Africa Cup of Nations

Personal information
- Full name: Harold Desty Moukoudi
- Date of birth: 27 November 1997 (age 28)
- Place of birth: Bondy, France
- Height: 1.91 m (6 ft 3 in)
- Position: Centre-back

Team information
- Current team: AEK Athens
- Number: 2

Youth career
- 2003–2006: US Nogent
- 2006–2009: Chantilly
- 2009–2010: Le Havre
- 2010–2012: Chantilly
- 2012–2015: Le Havre

Senior career*
| Years | Team | Apps | (Gls) |
| 2015–2017 | Le Havre B | 44 | (0) |
| 2016–2019 | Le Havre | 59 | (6) |
| 2019–2022 | Saint-Étienne | 61 | (3) |
| 2020 | → Middlesbrough (loan) | 8 | (0) |
| 2022– | AEK Athens | 87 | (9) |

International career
| 2012–2013 | France U16 | 10 | (1) |
| 2014 | France U17 | 1 | (0) |
| 2014 | France U18 | 3 | (0) |
| 2018 | France U20 | 4 | (0) |
| 2019– | Cameroon | 18 | (0) |
Medal record
Representing Cameroon
Men's football
Africa Cup of Nations
| Third place | 2021 Cameroon |
- * Club domestic league appearances and goals as of 20 September 2026

Harold Desty Moukoudi (born 27 November 1997) is a professional footballer who plays as a centre-back for Super League Greece club AEK Athens. Born in France, he represents Cameroon at international level.

== Early life ==
Moukoudi was born in Bondy, the same commune that Kylian Mbappé hails from. His parents were born in Douala, Cameroon. He acquired French nationality on 17 January 2000 through the collective effect of his father's naturalization.

== Club career ==
=== Le Havre ===
Moukoudi began his senior career with Le Havre B in 2015. He continued playing for the reserve team until 2017, gaining experience in the lower divisions of French football. He did not score any league goals for Le Havre B.

From 2016, he also featured for the first team of Le Havre. He made his Ligue 2 debut during the 2016–17 season and established himself as a regular centre-back the following season, scoring four goals in Ligue 2 during the 2017–18 campaign. His aerial ability and defensive skills, aided by his height, helped him develop into a key player for the team.

During the 2018–19 season, he continued to play an important role in Le Havre's defence, scoring two goals in Ligue 2.

=== Saint-Étienne ===
At the end of the contract in June 2019, he signed on 29 March 2019 in favour of AS Saint-Étienne. Moukoudi takes his first steps under the on 10 August 2019, the first day of the 2019–20 Ligue 1 season against the Dijon FCO. He is in central defense alongside Loïc Perrin and participates in the Les Verts's victory over the score of two goals to one.

On 31 January 2020 he was loaned to Middlesbrough. He is remembered by Saint-Étienne as early as July, in order to compete in the Coupe de France final against PSG. Moukoudi established himself in the Les Verts workforce as a reliable defence value in the following year. But the 2021-2022 season of the former Le Havre is a nightmare that he competes in 26 games under the green jersey, and wins no victory. The latter were relegated to Ligue 2 after a loss in return against Auxerre.

=== AEK Athens ===
On 17 August 2022, following his decision to leave Saint-Étienne, Moukoudi travelled to Athens to discuss a possible move to AEK. One day later, the Greek club officially announced the signing of Moukoudi on a free transfer, until the summer of 2026.

On 14 May 2023, AEK celebrated their 13th championship, after a comfortable 4–0 home win over Volos. Ten days later, Moukoudi scored in the Greek Cup final, which saw AEK prevail over PAOK with a 2–0 win and seal their first double since 1978 and third overall, despite playing with ten players from the sixth minute.

In early July, Lens offered a sum between €8 and €10 million, but the Greek club turned it down.

== International career ==
Due to his dual nationality, Moukoudi was originally eligible to play for both the Cameroonian and French national teams. He is a former youth international for France. He debuted for the senior Cameroon national team in a 0–0 friendly tie with Tunisia on 12 October 2019.

Moukoudi competes for his first international competition at the 2021 Africa Cup of Nations.

On 28 December 2023, he was selected from the list of 27 Cameroonian players chosen to compete in the 2023 Africa Cup of Nations.

== Career statistics ==
As of match played on 12 May 2026

Appearances and goals by club, season and competition
| Club | Season | League | | | National cup (Note: Includes Coupe de France, Greek Cup) | | League cup (Note: Includes Coupe de la Ligue) | | Europe | | Other | | Total | |
| Club | Season | Division | Apps | Goals | Apps | Goals | Apps | Goals | Apps | Goals | Apps | Goals | Apps | Goals |
|---|---|---|---|---|---|---|---|---|---|---|---|---|---|---|
| Le Havre B | 2014–15 | Championnat National 3 | 7 | 0 | — | | — | | — | | — | | 7 | 0 |
| Le Havre B | 2015–16 | Championnat National 3 | 14 | 0 | — | | — | | — | | — | | 14 | 0 |
| Le Havre B | 2016–17 | Championnat National 2 | 23 | 0 | — | | — | | — | | — | | 23 | 0 |
| Le Havre B | Total | | 44 | 0 | — | | — | | — | | — | | 44 | 0 |
| Le Havre | 2016–17 | Ligue 2 | 7 | 0 | 1 | 0 | 0 | 0 | — | | — | | 8 | 0 |
| Le Havre | 2017–18 | Ligue 2 | 35 | 4 | 1 | 0 | 2 | 0 | — | | — | | 38 | 4 |
| Le Havre | 2018–19 | Ligue 2 | 17 | 2 | 0 | 0 | 2 | 0 | — | | — | | 19 | 2 |
| Le Havre | Total | | 59 | 6 | 2 | 0 | 4 | 0 | — | | — | | 65 | 6 |
| Saint-Étienne | 2019–20 | Ligue 1 | 11 | 0 | 2 | 0 | 1 | 0 | 3 (Note: Appearances in UEFA Europa League) | 0 | — | | 17 | 0 |
| Saint-Étienne | 2020–21 | Ligue 1 | 26 | 3 | 0 | 0 | — | | — | | — | | 26 | 3 |
| Saint-Étienne | 2021–22 | Ligue 1 | 24 | 0 | 0 | 0 | — | | — | | 2 (Note: Appearances in Ligue 1 relegation/promotion play-offs) | 0 | 26 | 0 |
| Saint-Étienne | Total | | 61 | 3 | 2 | 0 | 1 | 0 | 3 | 0 | 2 | 0 | 69 | 3 |
| Middlesbrough (loan) | 2019–20 | Championship | 8 | 0 | 0 | 0 | 0 | 0 | — | | — | | 8 | 0 |
| AEK Athens | 2022–23 | Super League Greece | 27 | 2 | 3 | 1 | — | | — | | — | | 30 | 3 |
| AEK Athens | 2023–24 | Super League Greece | 10 | 1 | 0 | 0 | — | | 9 (Note: Four appearances in UEFA Champions League, five appearances in UEFA Europa League) | 0 | — | | 19 | 1 |
| AEK Athens | 2024–25 | Super League Greece | 21 | 4 | 5 | 0 | — | | 3 (Note: Appearances in UEFA Conference League) | 1 | — | | 29 | 5 |
| AEK Athens | 2025–26 | Super League Greece | 24 | 2 | 3 | 0 | — | | 14 | 1 | — | | 41 | 3 |
| AEK Athens | Total | | 82 | 9 | 11 | 1 | 0 | 0 | 26 | 2 | 0 | 0 | 119 | 12 |
| Career total | | | 254 | 18 | 15 | 1 | 5 | 0 | 29 | 2 | 2 | 0 | 305 | 21 |

== Honours ==
Saint-Étienne

- Coupe de France runner-up: 2019–20

AEK Athens

- Super League Greece: 2022–23, 2025–26
- Greek Football Cup: 2022–23

Cameroon

- Africa Cup of Nations third place: 2021

=== Individual ===
- Super League Greece Team of the Season: 2022–23
