= Ministry of Justice (Togo) =

Government ministry of Togo

The Ministry of Justice and Human Rights of Togo oversees institutions and bodies such as the following:

- Center for the Training of the Professions of Justice (CFPJ)
- National Commission of OHADA
- Courts and tribunals
- Interministerial commission for drafting initial and periodic reports on human rights
- National human rights institutions, civil society organizations and the public and private media
- Humanitarian law

The following responsibilities are assigned to the Minister of Justice and Human Rights:

- General inspectorate of judicial and penitentiary services
- The person responsible for public procurement;
- The public procurement commission;
- The commission of control of the public markets

== List of ministers (Post-1960 upon achieving independence) ==
- Sylvanus Olympio (1960–1961)
- Andre Kuevidjen (1963–1966)
- Leonidas Kouassi (1967)
- Kléber Dadjo (1967–1969)
- Janvier Chango (1969–1974)
- Nanamalé Gbégbéni (1974–1977)
- Issa Sama (1977–1978)
- Bibi Yao Savi de Tove (1978–1980) [1st female]
- Akanyi Awunyo Kodjovi (1980–1982)
- Ayivi Mawuko Ajavon (1982–1986)
- Anani Mawugbe (1986–1987)
- Kpotivi Tevi Djidjogbe Lacle (1987–1989)
- Bitokotipou Yagninim (1990)
- Koami Kuma Alfred Tordjo (1991–1992)
- Arégba Polo (1993)
- Kangni Gabriel Akakpovie (1994)
- Elliott Latévi-Atcho Lawson (1995–1996)
- Stanislaus Somolu Baba (1997–1999) [Bitokotipou Yagninim, 1998]
- Seye Memene (1999–2002)
- Katari Foli-Bazi (2002–2005)
- Tchessa Abi (2005–2009)
- Kokou Tozoun (2009–2011)
- Tchitchao Tchalim (2011–2014)
- Kofi Esaw (2014–2017)
- Pius Agbetomey (2017–present)

== See also ==
- Justice ministry
- Politics of Togo
