= Tchessa Abi =

Togolese minister

Tchessa Abi is a Togolese barrister. He was the Togolese Minister of Justice from 2005 to 2009. Prior to his cabinet appointment, he was the leader of the Party of Social Reformers in Togo.

His son Charles Abi is a professional footballer, who has played as a youth international for France, in the national U16, U18 and U19 teams.
