= Romain Hamouma =

French footballer (born 1987)

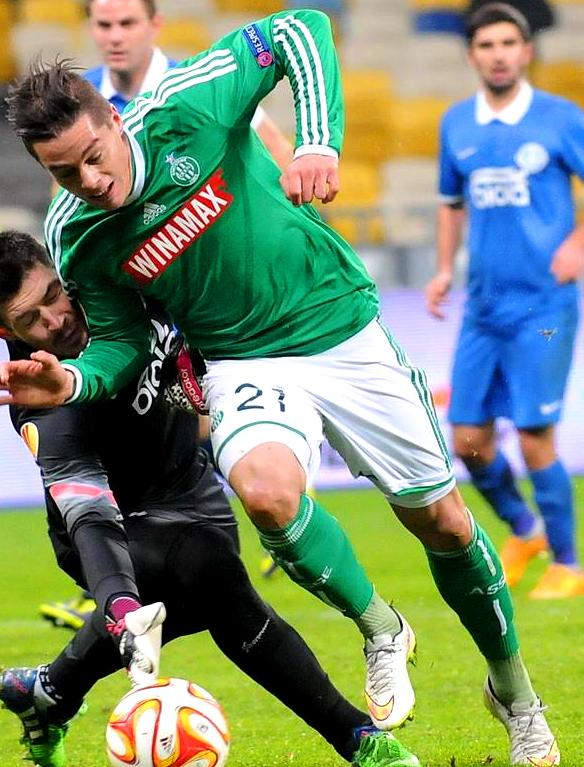
- Hamouma with Saint-Étienne in 2014

Personal information
- Date of birth: 29 March 1987 (age 39)
- Place of birth: Lure, France
- Height: 1.77 m (5 ft 10 in)
- Position: Winger

Youth career
- 1992–1998: JS Luronnes
- 1998–2000: Belfort
- 2000–2005: Sochaux

Senior career*
Years	Team	Apps	(Gls)
2005–2009	Besançon	131	(17)
2009–2010	Laval	35	(10)
2010–2012	Caen	63	(11)
2010–2011	Caen II	2	(1)
2012–2022	Saint-Étienne	265	(50)
2022–2023	Ajaccio	19	(2)
- * Club domestic league appearances and goals as of 00:14, 15 May 2023 (UTC)

Romain Hamouma (born 29 March 1987) is a French former professional footballer who played as a winger.

== Career ==
On 20 June 2022, after having played for Saint-Étienne for ten years, Hamouma joined newly promoted Ligue 1 side Ajaccio.

== Personal life ==
Hamouma's paternal grandfather was from the Kabylie region of Algeria, and he has been approached to compete for the Algeria national team, but he has declined, saying that he "feels more French than Algerian".

== Career statistics ==
As of 20 June 2022

Appearances and goals by club, season and competition
Club	Season	League			National cup		League cup		Other		Total	
Club	Season	Division	Apps	Goals	Apps	Goals	Apps	Goals	Apps	Goals	Apps	Goals
Laval	2009–10	Ligue 2	35	10	0	0	2	0	—		37	10
Caen	2010–11	Ligue 1	32	9	1	0	1	0	—		34	9
Caen	2011–12	Ligue 1	31	2	1	1	3	2	—		35	5
Caen	Total		63	11	2	1	4	2	—		69	14
Caen II	2010–11	CFA	2	1	—		—		—		2	1
Saint-Étienne	2012–13	Ligue 1	31	5	3	0	4	2	—		38	7
Saint-Étienne	2013–14	Ligue 1	34	9	0	0	1	0	4 (Note: Appearances in the UEFA Europa League)	2	39	11
Saint-Étienne	2014–15	Ligue 1	26	3	4	1	2	1	6	0	38	5
Saint-Étienne	2015–16	Ligue 1	24	3	0	0	0	0	9	5	33	8
Saint-Étienne	2016–17	Ligue 1	29	7	2	1	1	0	8	0	40	8
Saint-Étienne	2017–18	Ligue 1	29	5	2	0	1	0	—		32	5
Saint-Étienne	2018–19	Ligue 1	27	4	1	0	1	0	—		29	4
Saint-Étienne	2019–20	Ligue 1	14	6	2	0	0	0	4	0	20	6
Saint-Étienne	2020–21	Ligue 1	29	6	0	0	—		—		29	6
Saint-Étienne	2021–22	Ligue 1	22	2	0	0	—		1 (Note: Appearance(s) in the Ligue 1 relegation/promotion play-offs)	0	23	2
Saint-Étienne	Total		265	50	14	2	10	3	32	7	321	62
Ajaccio	2022–23	Ligue 1	0	0	0	0	—		—		0	0
Career total			365	72	16	3	16	5	32	7	429	87

== Honours ==
Saint-Étienne

- Coupe de la Ligue: 2012–13
- Coupe de France runner-up: 2019–20
