= Assane Dioussé =

Senegalese footballer

Personal information
- Full name: El Hadji Assane Dioussé
- Date of birth: 20 September 1997 (age 29)
- Place of birth: Dakar, Senegal
- Height: 1.75 m (5 ft 9 in)
- Position: Defensive midfielder

Team information
- Current team: Auxerre
- Number: 18

Youth career
- 2010–2015: Empoli

Senior career*
Years	Team	Apps	(Gls)
2015–2017	Empoli	48	(0)
2017–2022	Saint-Étienne	41	(1)
2019	→ Chievo (loan)	14	(0)
2020–2021	→ Ankaragücü (loan)	20	(0)
2018–2019	Saint-Étienne B	3	(0)
2022–2023	OFI	33	(3)
2023–	Auxerre	66	(0)

International career
2017	Senegal U20	1	(0)
2017–2018	Senegal	3	(0)
- * Club domestic league appearances and goals as of 20 May 2026

El Hadji Assane Dioussé (born 20 September 1997) is a Senegalese professional footballer who plays as a defensive midfielder for Ligue 1 club Auxerre.

== Club career ==
=== Empoli ===
Dioussé is a youth product from Empoli. He made his Serie A debut on 23 August 2015 against Chievo Verona.

=== Saint-Étienne ===
On 31 July 2017, Assane Dioussé signed a five-year contract with Saint-Étienne.

==== Loan to Chievo ====
On 29 January 2019, Dioussé joined on loan to Serie A side Chievo Verona until 30 June 2019.

=== OFI ===
On 13 July 2022, Dioussé signed a two-year contract with OFI in Greece.

== International career ==
Dioussé debuted for the Senegal U20s in an Under-20 Four Nations Tournament 3–0 loss to France U20s on 23 March 2017.

Dioussé received his first call up for the Senegal senior national team on 28 August 2017, ahead of the following month's 2018 FIFA World Cup qualifying matches against Burkina Faso. On 14 November he made his Senegal debut, when he came on in the 88th minute as a substitute for Alfred N'Diaye in a 2018 FIFA World Cup qualification match against South Africa at the Stade Léopold Sédar Senghor. Senegal won the match 2–1.

== Career statistics ==
=== Club ===
As of match played 17 May 2024

Appearances and goals by club, season and competition
Club	Season	League			Cup		League Cup		Europe		Other		Total	
Club	Season	Division	Apps	Goals	Apps	Goals	Apps	Goals	Apps	Goals	Apps	Goals	Apps	Goals
Empoli	2015–16	Serie A	15	0	1	0	—		—		—		16	0
Empoli	2016–17	Serie A	33	0	2	0	—		—		—		35	0
Empoli	Total		48	0	3	0	—		—		—		51	0
Saint-Étienne	2017–18	Ligue 1	25	1	1	0	0	0	—		—		26	1
Saint-Étienne	2018–19	Ligue 1	7	0	2	0	1	0	—		—		10	0
Saint-Étienne	2019–20	Ligue 1	4	0	5	0	1	0	1	0	—		11	0
Saint-Étienne	2020–21	Ligue 1	1	0	0	0	—		—		—		1	0
Saint-Étienne	2021–22	Ligue 1	4	0	2	0	—		—		1 (Note: Appearance in the Ligue 1 relegation/promotion play-offs)	0	7	0
Saint-Étienne	Total		41	1	10	0	2	0	1	0	1	0	55	1
Saint-Étienne B	2018–19	National 2	1	0	—		—		—		—		1	0
Saint-Étienne B	2019–20	National 2	2	0	—		—		—		—		2	0
Saint-Étienne B	Total		3	0	—		—		—		—		3	0
Chievo (loan)	2018–19	Serie A	14	0	0	0	—		—		—		14	0
Ankaragücü (loan)	2020–21	Süper Lig	20	0	1	0	—		—		—		21	0
OFI	2022–23	Super League Greece	33	3	1	0	—		—		—		34	3
Auxerre	2023–24	Ligue 2	34	0	3	0	—		—		—		37	0
Career total			193	4	18	0	2	0	1	0	1	0	215	4

== Honours ==
Saint-Étienne

- Coupe de France runner-up: 2019–20

Auxerre

- Ligue 2: 2023–24
