= Edmilson Correia =

Bissau-Guinean footballer

Personal information
- Full name: Edmilson Indjai Correia
- Date of birth: 6 June 2000 (age 26)
- Place of birth: Bissau, Guinea Bissau
- Height: 1.76 m (5 ft 9 in)
- Position: Winger

Senior career*
| Years | Team | Apps | (Gls) |
| 2019–2023 | Saint-Étienne B | 41 | (11) |
| 2019–2020 | Saint-Étienne | 4 | (0) |
| 2023–2024 | Al Bidda | 11 | (5) |
| 2024–2025 | Hyderabad | 16 | (2) |

International career^{‡}
| 2022– | Guinea-Bissau | 2 | (0) |
- * Club domestic league appearances and goals as of 13:29, 12 March 2025 (UTC) ‡ National team caps and goals as of 22:00, 20 November 2022 (UTC)

Edmilson Indjai Correia (born 6 June 2000) is a Bissau-Guinean professional footballer who plays as a winger for the Guinea-Bissau national team.

== Career ==
Correia arrived at Saint-Étienne in 2019 from Guinea Bissau. He made his professional debut with the club in a 0–0 Ligue 1 draw with Montpellier on 24 November 2019. Correia left the club in 2023.
