= Pius Agbetomey =

Togolese lawyer

Kokouvi Pius Agbetomey (born July 11, 1956) is a Togolese judge. He is Togo’s Minister of Justice and Relations with the Republic’s Institutions since June 28, 2015.
