= Charles Abi =

Togolese footballer (born 2000)

Personal information
- Full name: Charles Nathan Abi
- Date of birth: 12 April 2000 (age 26)
- Place of birth: Clermont-Ferrand, France
- Height: 1.87 m (6 ft 2 in)
- Position: Forward

Team information
- Current team: Valenciennes
- Number: 7

Youth career
- 2007–2008: FC Aubièrois
- 2008–2009: FC Pérignat
- 2009–2015: Clermont
- 2015–2018: Saint-Étienne

Senior career*
Years	Team	Apps	(Gls)
2017–2023	Saint-Étienne B	29	(4)
2018–2023	Saint-Étienne	43	(3)
2021–2022	→ Guingamp (loan)	18	(1)
2023–2025	Stade Lausanne Ouchy	8	(0)
2025–2026	Rouen	22	(10)
2026–	Valenciennes	13	(1)

International career^{‡}
2016	France U16	11	(2)
2018	France U18	6	(1)
2018–2019	France U19	16	(6)
2026–	Togo	3	(0)
- * Club domestic league appearances and goals as of 23 June 2026 ‡ National team caps and goals as of 20 June 2026

Charles Nathan Abi (born 12 April 2000) is a professional footballer who plays as a forward for Ligue 3 club Valenciennes. Born in France, he plays for the Togo national team.

== Personal life ==
Charles Abi was born in Clermont-Ferrand in the center of France to Togolese parents. His father, Tchessa Abi, is a Togolese barrister and minister. He holds French and Togolese nationalities.

== Club career ==
On 25 April 2018, Abi signed his first professional contract with Saint-Étienne. He made his professional debut with Saint-Étienne in a 1–1 Ligue 1 tie with Nice on 16 December 2018, and scored his first first team goal in an away Coupe de France tie at Paris FC, on 18 January 2020.

On 31 August 2021, Abi joined Guingamp on loan for the 2021–22 season.

On 6 February 2023, Abi signed for Swiss Challenge League club Stade Lausanne Ouchy. Instead of a transfer fee, Saint-Étienne received a sell-on clause.

On 18 January 2025, Abi signed a six-months contract with Championnat National club Rouen, with a club option to extend for two additional seasons.

== International career ==
Abi is a youth international for France, playing for the national U16, U18 and U19 teams. He was called up to the Togo national team for a set of friendlies in March 2026.

== Honours ==
Saint-Étienne

- Coupe de France runner-up: 2019–20
