= Zaydou Youssouf =

Footballer (born 1999)

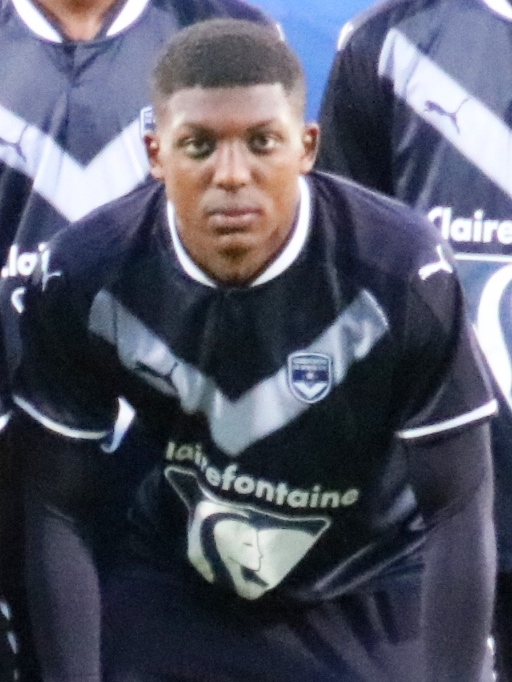
- Youssouf in 2017

Personal information
- Date of birth: 11 July 1999 (age 27)
- Place of birth: Lormont, France
- Height: 1.82 m (6 ft 0 in)
- Position: Central midfielder

Team information
- Current team: Al-Fateh
- Number: 33

Youth career
- 2007–2009: CMO Bassens
- 2009–2016: Bordeaux

Senior career*
| Years | Team | Apps | (Gls) |
| 2016–2019 | Bordeaux II | 26 | (8) |
| 2016–2019 | Bordeaux | 19 | (0) |
| 2019–2022 | Saint-Étienne | 76 | (2) |
| 2022–2025 | Famalicão | 81 | (6) |
| 2025– | Al-Fateh | 30 | (2) |

International career^{‡}
| 2017 | France U18 | 1 | (0) |
| 2017–2018 | France U19 | 4 | (0) |
| 2017–2019 | France U20 | 4 | (0) |
| 2019 | France U21 | 2 | (0) |
| 2024– | Comoros | 11 | (0) |
- * Club domestic league appearances and goals as of 20:29, 20 January 2026 (UTC) ‡ National team caps and goals as of 12:41, 3 January 2026 (UTC)

Zaydou Youssouf (born 11 July 1999) is a professional footballer who plays as a central midfielder for Saudi Pro League club Al-Fateh. Born in France, he plays for the Comoros national team.

== Club career ==
=== Early career ===
A youth product of CMO Bassens, Youssouf moved to the youth academy of Bordeaux in 2009 where he finished his development.He made his professional debut for Bordeaux in a 1–1 Ligue 1 away draw against Bastia on 30 November 2016.

=== Saint-Étienne ===
On 5 July 2019, Youssouf signed with Ligue 1 side Saint-Étienne.

=== Famalicão ===
On 4 August 2022, Youssouf signed a four-year contract with Famalicão in Portugal.

=== Al-Fateh ===
On 31 January 2025, Youssouf joined Saudi Arabian club Al-Fateh on a three-and-a-half year deal.

== International career ==
Youssouf was born in France, and is of Comorian descent. A former youth international for France, he opted to play for the Comoros national team in November 2024.

On 11 December 2025, Youssouf was called up to the Comoros squad for the 2025 Africa Cup of Nations.

== Personal life ==
Youssouf is married to the Moroccan women's footballer Nawëal Ouinekh.

== Career statistics ==
As of match played 29 May 2022

Appearances and goals by club, season and competition
| Club | Season | League | | | National Cup | | League Cup | | Europe | | Other | | Total | |
| Club | Season | Division | Apps | Goals | Apps | Goals | Apps | Goals | Apps | Goals | Apps | Goals | Apps | Goals |
|---|---|---|---|---|---|---|---|---|---|---|---|---|---|---|
| Bordeaux B | 2016–17 | CFA 2 | 9 | 0 | — | | — | | — | | — | | 9 | 0 |
| Bordeaux B | 2017–18 | National 3 | 14 | 7 | — | | — | | — | | — | | 14 | 7 |
| Bordeaux B | 2018–19 | National 2 | 3 | 1 | — | | — | | — | | — | | 3 | 1 |
| Bordeaux B | Total | | 26 | 8 | — | | — | | — | | — | | 26 | 8 |
| Bordeaux | 2016–17 | Ligue 1 | 2 | 0 | 0 | 0 | 1 | 0 | — | | — | | 3 | 0 |
| Bordeaux | 2017–18 | Ligue 1 | 6 | 0 | 0 | 0 | 1 | 0 | 0 | 0 | — | | 7 | 0 |
| Bordeaux | 2018–19 | Ligue 1 | 11 | 0 | 0 | 0 | 0 | 0 | 8 | 1 | — | | 19 | 1 |
| Bordeaux | Total | | 19 | 0 | 0 | 0 | 2 | 0 | 8 | 1 | — | | 29 | 1 |
| Saint-Étienne | 2019–20 | Ligue 1 | 16 | 0 | 0 | 0 | 1 | 0 | 6 | 0 | — | | 23 | 0 |
| Saint-Étienne | 2020–21 | Ligue 1 | 29 | 1 | 1 | 0 | — | | — | | — | | 30 | 1 |
| Saint-Étienne | 2021–22 | Ligue 1 | 30 | 1 | 3 | 0 | — | | — | | 2 (Note: Appearance(s) in the Ligue 1 relegation/promotion play-offs) | 1 | 35 | 2 |
| Saint-Étienne | Total | | 75 | 2 | 4 | 0 | 1 | 0 | 6 | 0 | 2 | 1 | 88 | 3 |
| Career total | | | 120 | 10 | 4 | 0 | 3 | 0 | 14 | 1 | 2 | 1 | 143 | 12 |
