= Maxence Rivera =

French footballer (born 2002)

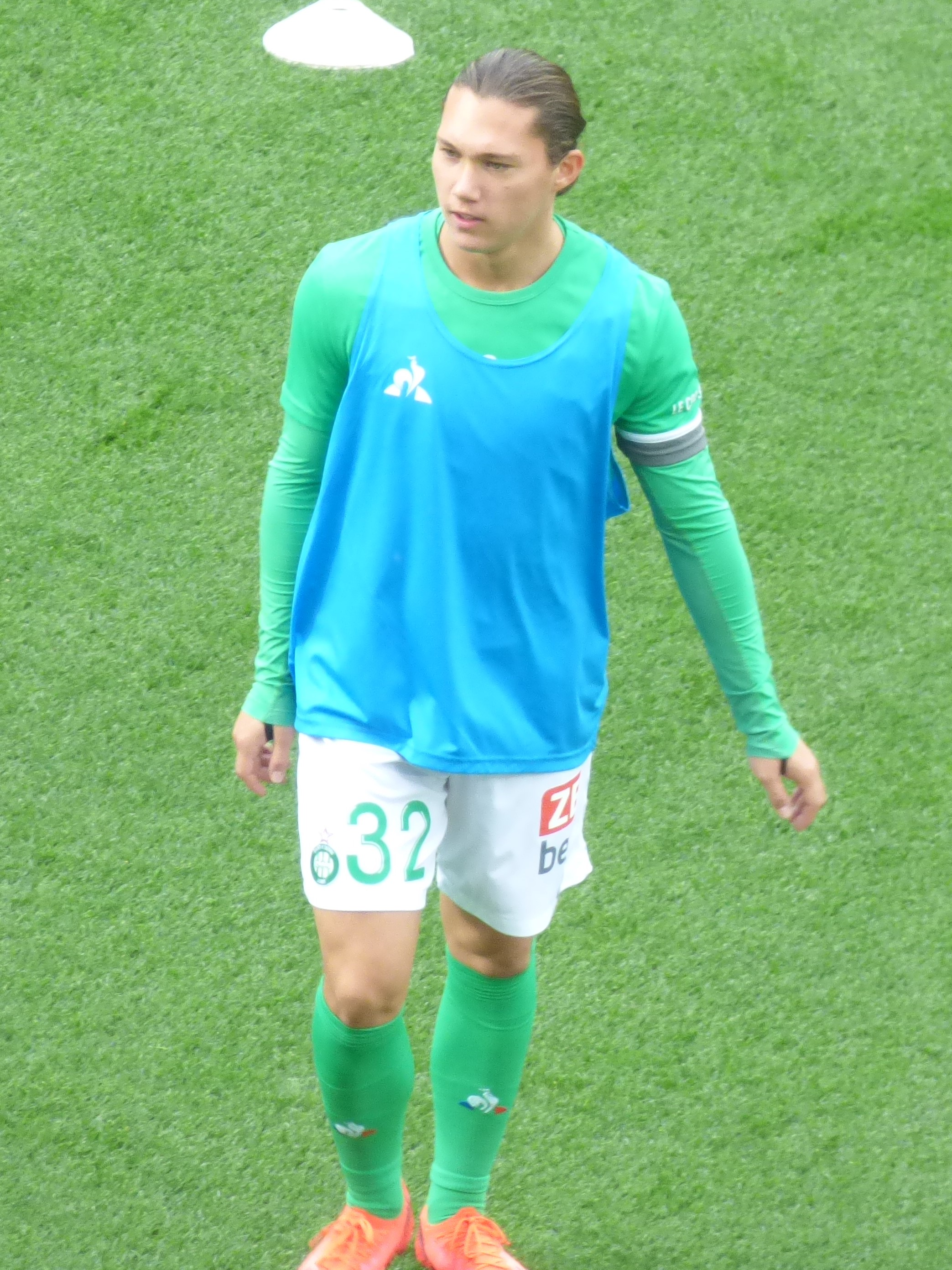
- Rivera with Saint-Étienne in 2020

Personal information
- Date of birth: 30 May 2002 (age 24)
- Place of birth: Perpignan, France
- Height: 1.71 m (5 ft 7 in)
- Position: Winger

Team information
- Current team: Heerenveen
- Number: 7

Youth career
- 2010–2012: Rochoise
- 2012–2015: Bourgoin-Jallieu
- 2016–2019: Saint-Étienne

Senior career*
Years	Team	Apps	(Gls)
2019–2024	Saint-Étienne B	36	(10)
2020–2024	Saint-Étienne	36	(0)
2022–2023	→ Le Puy (loan)	22	(2)
2024–2025	Dunkerque	29	(3)
2025–	Heerenveen	30	(4)

International career
2020	France U18	1	(0)
- * Club domestic league appearances and goals as of 19 May 2026

Maxence Rivera (born 30 May 2002) is a French professional footballer who plays as a winger for Eredivisie club Heerenveen

== Club career ==
Rivera began playing football at the youth academy of Bourgoin-Jallieu, and joined the youth academy of Saint-Étienne in 2015. On 3 January 2020, he signed his first professional contract with Saint-Étienne. He made his professional debut with Saint-Étienne in a 6–1 Coupe de la Ligue loss to Paris Saint-Germain on 8 January 2020.

On 31 August 2022, Rivera signed for Championnat National club Le Puy on a season-long loan. He made his debut for Le Puy in a 1–0 win against Stade Briochin on 9 September 2022, coming on as a substitute for Yannis M'Bemba. He scored his first goal in a 3–2 Coupe de France win over SA Thiers on 19 November 2022.

He returned to Saint-Étienne on 19 August 2023 as an unused substitute in a Ligue 2 match against Quevilly-Rouen. He made his first appearance since leaving for Le Puy, in their next game, a 1–1 draw against Annecy.

On 10 June 2024, Rivera signed for Ligue 2 club Dunkerque ahead of the expiration of his Saint-Étienne contract.

On 20 June 2025, Rivera joined Eredivisie side Heerenveen, signing a three-year deal with an option of a fourth.
