= Bilal Benkhedim =

French footballer (born 2001)

Personal information
- Date of birth: 20 April 2001 (age 25)
- Place of birth: Bagnols-sur-Cèze, France
- Height: 1.75 m (5 ft 9 in)
- Position: Midfielder

Team information
- Current team: MC Oran
- Number: 10

Youth career
- 2007–2009: Nîmes
- 2009–2010: Montpellier
- 2010–2011: Uzès Pont du Gard
- 2011–2012: Bagnols Pont
- 2012–2013: Uzès Pont du Gard
- 2013–2014: SC Orange
- 2014: Avignon
- 2014–2016: Alès
- 2016–2018: Saint-Étienne

Senior career*
Years	Team	Apps	(Gls)
2018–2022	Saint-Étienne B	34	(7)
2019–2022	Saint-Étienne	6	(0)
2022–2023	Le Puy	2	(0)
2023–2024	Stade Lausanne Ouchy II		
2024–2026	F91 Dudelange	40	(12)
2026–	MC Oran	4	(1)

International career
2018–2019	France U18	7	(0)
- * Club domestic league appearances and goals as of 6 June 2025

Bilal Benkhedim (Arabic: بلال بن خديم; born 20 April 2001) is a French-Algerian professional footballer who plays as a midfielder for Algerian Club club MC Oran.

== Club career ==
On 13 February 2018, Benkhedim signed his first professional contract with Saint-Étienne. He made his professional debut with Saint-Étienne in a 0–0 Ligue 1 tie with Montpellier on 24 November 2019.

On 7 December 2022, Benkhedim signed with Le Puy.

On 21 January 2026, he joined Algerian club MC Oran.

== International career ==
Benkhedim was born in France to an Algerian father and Moroccan mother. He is a youth international for France.
