= 2023–24 FK Čukarički season =

FK Čukarički
2023–24 season
- Manager: Igor Matić
- Stadium: Čukarički Stadium
- Serbian SuperLiga: 4th
- Serbian Cup: Quarter-finals
- UEFA Europa League: Play-off round
- UEFA Europa Conference League: Group stage
| Home colours | Away colours |

The 2023–24 season is FK Čukarički's 98th season in existence and 11th consecutive in the Serbian top division Serbian SuperLiga. They are also competing in the Serbian Cup, UEFA Europa League and the UEFA Europa Conference League.

== Players ==
=== First-team squad ===
As of 5 September 2023

Note: Flags indicate national team as defined under FIFA eligibility rules; some limited exceptions apply. Players may hold more than one non-FIFA nationality.

| No. | Pos. | Nation | Player |
|---|---|---|---|
| 1 | GK | SRB | Nemanja Belić |
| 2 | DF | SRB | Viktor Rogan |
| 3 | DF | SRB | Nemanja Tošić |
| 4 | DF | SRB | Bojan Kovačević |
| 5 | MF | SRB | Marko Docić (captain) |
| 6 | DF | SRB | Miladin Stevanović |
| 7 | MF | SRB | Stefan Tomović |
| 8 | MF | SRB | Luka Stojanović |
| 9 | FW | NGR | Sunday Adetunji |
| 10 | FW | SRB | Đorđe Ivanović |
| 11 | FW | SRB | Luka Adžić |
| 14 | MF | MLI | Sambou Sissoko |
| 15 | DF | SRB | Luka Subotić |
| 16 | FW | GBS | José Mário Gomes |
| 17 | FW | RSA | Luther Singh |
| 18 | DF | SRB | Vukašin Jovanović |
| 20 | DF | SRB | Veljko Mirosavić |

| No. | Pos. | Nation | Player |
|---|---|---|---|
| 21 | MF | SRB | Nikola Stanković |
| 22 | DF | BIH | Ognjen Vranješ |
| 23 | GK | SRB | Filip Samurović |
| 24 | GK | SRB | Nenad Filipović |
| 30 | DF | SRB | Vojin Serafimović |
| 45 | MF | SRB | Igor Miladinović |
| 47 | MF | MNE | Bojica Nikčević |
| 65 | DF | SRB | Lazar Stojanović |
| 66 | MF | BEN | Mattéo Ahlinvi |
| 70 | FW | SRB | Aleksa Janković |
| 72 | FW | SEN | Ibrahima Ndiaye |
| 77 | MF | BIH | Stefan Kovač |
| 81 | GK | SRB | Vladan Čarapić |
| 82 | MF | SRB | Veljko Radosavljević |
| 88 | FW | SRB | Marko Arsović |
| 91 | FW | SRB | Mihajlo Cvetković |
| 99 | FW | SRB | Nikša Delibašić |

=== Out on loan ===
Note: Flags indicate national team as defined under FIFA eligibility rules; some limited exceptions apply. Players may hold more than one non-FIFA nationality.

| No. | Pos. | Nation | Player |
|---|---|---|---|
| — | GK | SRB | Lazar Kaličanin (at Smederevo 1924) |
| — | GK | SRB | Novak Mićović (at LA Galaxy) |
| — | MF | SRB | Vukašin Braunović (at OFK Vršac) |
| — | MF | SRB | Mitar Ergelaš (at Novi Pazar) |

| No. | Pos. | Nation | Player |
|---|---|---|---|
| — | MF | SRB | Matija Stojanović (at Novi Sad) |
| — | FW | GAM | Muhammed Badamosi (at Al-Hazem) |
| — | FW | SRB | Uroš Miladinović (at OFK Vršac) |
| — | FW | SRB | Lazar Vrekić (at Novi Sad) |

== Transfers ==
=== In ===
| Pos. | Player | Transferred from | Fee | Date | Source |
|---|---|---|---|---|---|
| DF | (Bosnia and Herzegovina) Ognjen Vranješ | (Turkey) Hatayspor | Undisclosed | 1 September 2023 | |
| FW | (Brazil) Vinicius Mello | (United States) Charlotte | Undisclosed | 7 February 2024 | |
| DF | (Uruguay) Guzmán Corujo | (United States) Charlotte | Free | 9 February 2024 | |
| FW | (Serbia) Milan Pavkov | (Saudi Arabia) Al-Fayha | Undisclosed | 16 February 2024 | |

=== In ===
| Pos. | Player | Transferred to | Fee | Date | Source |
|---|---|---|---|---|---|
| DF | (Serbia) Bojan Kovačević | (Serbia) Partizan | €600,000 | 13 February 2024 | |
| DF | (Bosnia and Herzegovina) Ognjen Vranješ | Released | | 1 April 2024 | |

== Pre-season and friendlies ==
Win Draw Loss Fixtures

== Competitions ==
=== Overall record ===
| Competition | First match | Last match | Starting round | Final position | Record | | | | | | | |
| Competition | First match | Last match | Starting round | Final position | Pld | W | D | L | GF | GA | GD | Win % |
|---|---|---|---|---|---|---|---|---|---|---|---|---|
| Serbian SuperLiga | 22 July 2023 | 26 May 2024 | Matchday 1 | | 19 | 8 | 5 | 6 | 28 | 21 | +7 | 42.11 |
| Serbian Cup | 1 November 2023 | | | | 2 | 1 | 1 | 0 | 4 | 1 | +3 | 50.00 |
| UEFA Europa League | 24 August 2023 | 31 August 2023 | Play-off round | Play-off round | 2 | 0 | 0 | 2 | 1 | 6 | −5 | 0.00 |
| UEFA Europa Conference League | 21 September 2023 | 14 December 2023 | Group stage | Group stage | 6 | 0 | 0 | 6 | 2 | 16 | −14 | 0.00 |
| Total | | | | | 29 | 9 | 6 | 14 | 35 | 44 | −9 | 31.03 |

Last updated: 22 December 2023
Source: Soccerway

=== Serbian SuperLiga ===
==== League table ====
| Pos | Team | Pld | W | D | L | GF | GA | GD | Pts | Qualification |
|---|---|---|---|---|---|---|---|---|---|---|
| 4 | Vojvodina | 30 | 14 | 8 | 8 | 49 | 42 | +7 | 50 | Qualification for the Championship round |
| 5 | Radnički 1923 | 30 | 16 | 2 | 12 | 46 | 46 | 0 | 50 | Qualification for the Championship round |
| 6 | Čukarički | 30 | 13 | 9 | 8 | 44 | 33 | +11 | 48 | Qualification for the Championship round |
| 7 | Mladost Lučani | 30 | 11 | 7 | 12 | 30 | 40 | −10 | 40 | Qualification for the Championship round |
| 8 | Napredak Kruševac | 30 | 11 | 6 | 13 | 31 | 39 | −8 | 39 | Qualification for the Championship round |

Source: SuperLiga (in Serbian)
Rules for classification: 1) Points; 2) Head-to-head points; 3) Head-to-head goal difference; 4) Head-to-head goals scored; 5) Head-to-head away goals scored (if two teams tied); 6) Goal difference; 7) Goals scored; 8) Fair play ranking; 9) Draw.

==== Results summary ====
| Overall | | | | | | | | Home | | | | | | Away | | | | | |
| Pld | W | D | L | GF | GA | GD | Pts | W | D | L | GF | GA | GD | W | D | L | GF | GA | GD |
|---|---|---|---|---|---|---|---|---|---|---|---|---|---|---|---|---|---|---|---|
| 0 | 0 | 0 | 0 | 0 | 0 | 0 | 0 | 0 | 0 | 0 | 0 | 0 | 0 | 0 | 0 | 0 | 0 | 0 | 0 |

Last updated: December 2023.

==== Results by round ====
| Round | 1 |
|---|---|
| Ground | |
| Result | |
| Position | |

Updated to match(es) played on December 2023. Source:
A = Away; H = Home; W = Win; D = Draw; L = Loss

==== Matches ====
| 29 July 2023 1 | Čukarički | 2–0 | Radnički Niš | Belgrade |
| 18:55 CEST (UTC+2) | Badamosi 52'; N'Diaye 90' | Report | | Stadium: Čukarički Stadium; Referee: Nenad Minaković |

| 6 August 2023 2 | Radnički 1923 | 1–2 | Čukarički | Kragujevac |
| 17:00 CEST (UTC+2) | Chinedu 63' | Report | Docić 57'; Tošić 67' | Stadium: Čika Dača Stadium; Referee: Danilo Nikolić |

| 12 August 2023 3 | Čukarički | 2–2 | Javor | Belgrade |
| 21:00 CEST (UTC+2) | Miladinović 15'; Drezgić 70' | Report | Tanko 18'; Gojković 81' (pen.) | Stadium: Čukarički Stadium; Attendance: 400; Referee: Aleksandar Živković |

| 18 August 2023 4 | IMT | 3–0 | Čukarički | Belgrade |
| 18:00 CEST (UTC+2) | Luković 34'; Stamenić 77'; Luković 90' | Report | | Stadium: Voždovac Stadium; Attendance: 500; Referee: Dejan Trifković |

| 27 August 2023 5 | Čukarički | 0–0 | Radnik Surdulica | Belgrade |
| 19:30 CEST (UTC+2) | | Report | | Stadium: Čukarički Stadium; Attendance: 300; Referee: Nikola Đorđević |

| 4 September 2023 6 | Železničar | 2–2 | Čukarički | Pančevo |
| 19:00 CEST (UTC+2) | Đorđević 30'; Romanić 35' | Report | Miladinović 48'; Cvetković 82' | Stadium: SC Mladost; Attendance: 1,500; Referee: Ivan Stamenković |

| 16 September 2023 7 | Čukarički | 2–1 | Red Star Belgrade | Belgrade |
| 18:05 CEST (UTC+2) | Docić 24' (pen.); Adetunji 75' | Report | Krasso 48' (pen.) | Stadium: Čukarički Stadium; Attendance: 3,500; Referee: Miloš Milanović |

| 30 September 2023 10 | Spartak Subotica | 0–3 | Čukarički | Subotica |
| 17:00 CEST (UTC+2) | | Report | Adžić 13'; Miladinović 24'; Ivanović 77' | Stadium: Subotica City Stadium; Attendance: 600; Referee: Milan Ilić |

| 8 October 2023 11 | Čukarički | 1–1 | Voždovac | Belgrade |
| 17:30 CEST (UTC+2) | Singh 52' | Report | Burmaz 35' | Stadium: Čukarički Stadium; Attendance: 300; Referee: Andrija Stojanović |

| 20 October 2023 12 | Novi Pazar | 1–0 | Čukarički | Novi Pazar |
| 17:00 CEST (UTC+2) | Obradović 81' | Report | | Stadium: Novi Pazar City Stadium; Attendance: 0 Referee: Novak Simović |

| 29 October 2023 13 | Čukarički | 2–2 | Vojvodina | Belgrade |
| 16:30 CET (UTC+1) | Kovač 36'; Singh 85' | Report | Zukić 13'; Vukanović 16' | Stadium: Čukarički Stadium; Attendance: 400; Referee: Stanko Ostraćanin |

| 5 November 2023 14 | Čukarički | 0–2 | TSC | Belgrade |
| 15:30 CEST (UTC+2) | | Report | Ćirković 23'; Cvetković 83' | Stadium: Čukarički Stadium; Attendance: 200; Referee: Pavle Ilić |

| 12 November 2023 15 | Partizan | 2–1 | Čukarički | Belgrade |
| 19:00 CET (UTC+1) | Saldanha 21'; Ilić 90' | Report | Miladinović 84' | Stadium: Partizan Stadium; Attendance: 5,000; Referee: Danilo Nikolić |

| 22 November 2023 8 | Napredak Kruševac | 1–0 | Čukarički | Kruševac |
| 16:00 CET (UTC+1) | Zličić 38' | Report | | Stadium: Mladost Stadium; Attendance: 200; Referee: Novak Simović |

| 26 November 2023 16 | Radnički Niš | 0–2 | Čukarički | Niš |
| 15:00 CET (UTC+1) | | Report | Ivanović 47'; Kovač 76' | Stadium: Čair Stadium; Attendance: 300; Referee: Pedrag Janjuš |

| 3 December 2023 17 | Čukarički | 4–1 | Radnički 1923 | Belgrade |
| 13:00 CET (UTC+1) | Ivanović 8'; Adžić 35' (pen.); Cvetković 42'; Miladinović 43' | Report | Sahli 86' | Stadium: Čukarički Stadium; Attendance: 150; Referee: Nikola Radaković |

| 10 December 2023 18 | Javor | 1–2 | Čukarički | Ivanjica |
| 15:00 CET (UTC+1) | Bosić 55' | Report | Ivanović 8'; Stanković 88' | Stadium: Javor Stadium; Referee: Aleksandar Živković |

| 18 December 2023 19 | Čukarički | 0–1 | IMT | Belgrade |
| 18:00 CET (UTC+1) | | Report | Luković 40' | Stadium: Čukarički Stadium; Attendance: 150; Referee: Pavle Tomić |

| 22 December 2023 9 | Čukarički | 3–0 | Mladost Lučani | Belgrade |
| 14:00 CET (UTC+1) | N'Diaye 7'; Cvetković 43'; Miladinović 70' | Report | | Stadium: Čukarički Stadium; Referee: Danilo Nikolić |

=== Serbian Cup ===
| 1 November 2023 Round of 32 | Radnički Beograd | 0–0 (3–4 p) | Čukarički | Belgrade |
| 13:00 CET (UTC+1) | | Report | | Stadium: Stadion FK Radnički; Attendance: 250; Referee: Nikola Radaković |

| 6 December 2023 Round of 16 | Čukarički | 4–1 | Javor | Belgrade |
| 15:30 CET (UTC+1) | Cvetković 13'; Kovač 29'; Sissoko 37'; Ivanović 45' | Report | Loué 81' | Stadium: Čukarički Stadium; Attendance: 50; Referee: Stefan Jeknić |

| 10 April 2024 Quarter-finals | Čukarički | v | Vojvodina | Belgrade |
| --:-- CET (UTC+1) | | | | Stadium: Čukarički Stadium |

=== UEFA Europa League ===
==== Play-off round ====
| 24 August 2023 First leg | Olympiacos (Greece) | 3–1 | (Serbia) Čukarički | Piraeus, Greece |
| 22:00 EEST (UTC+3) | El Kaabi 3', 40'; Fortounis 16'; Retsos (yellow card) 66'; Quini (yellow card) 85' | Report | Nikčević (yellow card) 61'; Miladinović 90+3' | Stadium: Karaiskakis Stadium; Attendance: 24,332; Referee: Donatas Rumšas (Lithuania) |

| 31 August 2023 Second leg | Čukarički (Serbia) | 0–3 (1–6 agg.) | (Greece) Olympiacos | Leskovac, Serbia |
| 20:00 CEST (UTC+2) | Drezgić (yellow card) 3' | Report | Masouras 34'; Biel 45+1'; Retsos 53' | Stadium: Dubočica Stadium (Note: Čukarički played their home match at the Dubočica Stadium in Leskovac, instead of their regular stadium, Čukarički Stadium, in Belgrade, which did not meet UEFA requirements.); Attendance: 6,812; Referee: Danny Makkelie (Netherlands) |
Note: Olympiacos won 6–1 on aggregate.

=== UEFA Europa Conference League ===
==== Group stage ====
The draw for the group stage will be held on 1 September 2023.

| Pos | Team | Pld | W | D | L | GF | GA | GD | Pts | Qualification | FIO | FER | GNK | ČUK |
|---|---|---|---|---|---|---|---|---|---|---|---|---|---|---|
| 1 | (Italy) Fiorentina | 6 | 3 | 3 | 0 | 14 | 6 | +8 | 12 | Advance to round of 16 | — | 2–2 | 2–1 | 6–0 |
| 2 | (Hungary) Ferencváros | 6 | 2 | 4 | 0 | 9 | 6 | +3 | 10 | Advance to knockout round play-offs | 1–1 | — | 1–1 | 3–1 |
| 3 | (Belgium) Genk | 6 | 2 | 3 | 1 | 8 | 5 | +3 | 9 | | 2–2 | 0–0 | — | 2–0 |
| 4 | (Serbia) Čukarički | 6 | 0 | 0 | 6 | 2 | 16 | −14 | 0 | | 0–1 | 1–2 | 0–2 | — |

Source: UEFA
Rules for classification: Group stage tiebreakers

| 21 September 2023 1 | Ferencváros (Hungary) | 3–1 | (Serbia) Čukarički | Budapest, Hungary |
| 18:45 CEST (UTC+2) | B. Varga 44' (pen.); Kwabena 45+7'; S. Mmaee (yellow card) 50'; Pešić 79' | Report | Docić (yellow card) 19'; Ivanović 26', (yellow card) 41'; Kovač (yellow card) 33'; Adetunji (yellow card) 45+3'; Subotić (yellow card) 66' | Stadium: Ferencváros Stadion; Attendance: 17,859; Referee: Guillermo Cuadra Fernández (Spain) |

| 5 October 2023 2 | Čukarički (Serbia) | 0–2 | (Belgium) Genk | Leskovac, Serbia |
| 21:00 CEST (UTC+2) | Subotić (yellow card) 85'; Miladinović (yellow card) 90+2' | Report | Heynen 10'; Paintsil 21' (pen.) | Stadium: Dubočica Stadium; Attendance: 2,447; Referee: Adam Ladebäck (Sweden) |

| 26 October 2023 3 | Fiorentina (Italy) | 6–0 | (Serbia) Čukarički | Florence, Italy |
| 21:00 CEST (UTC+2) | Beltrán 6', 10'; Ikoné 29'; Sottil 65'; Martínez Quarta 73'; Lopez 83' | Report | Vranješ (yellow card) 7'; Docić (yellow card) 10'; Subotić (red card) 36' | Stadium: Stadio Artemio Franchi; Attendance: 15,357; Referee: Chrysovalantis Theouli (Cyprus) |

| 9 November 2023 4 | Čukarički (Serbia) | 0–1 | (Italy) Fiorentina | Leskovac, Serbia |
| 18:45 CET (UTC+1) | N'Diaye (yellow card) 6'; Adetunji (yellow card) 40'; Nikčević (yellow card) 47'; Singh (yellow card) 90+6' | Report | Nzola 8' (pen.); Biraghi (yellow card) 44'; Parisi (yellow card) 83' | Stadium: Dubočica Stadium; Attendance: 3,402; Referee: Robert Schröder (Germany) |

| 30 November 2023 5 | Čukarički (Serbia) | 1–2 | (Hungary) Ferencváros | Leskovac, Serbia |
| 21:00 CET (UTC+1) | Adžić 11'; Stankovic (not on pitch) (yellow card) 73'; Nikčević (yellow card) 74'; Stanković (yellow card) 90+4'; Matić (not on pitch) (yellow card) 90+7' (yellow-red card) 90+9'; Tošić (yellow card) 90+9'; V. Jovanović (yellow card) 90+9' (yellow-red card) 90+11' | Report | Abena (yellow card) 44'; Abu Fani (yellow card) 74'; Zachariassen 83', (yellow card) 90+7'; Pešić 90+8', (yellow card) 90+9' | Stadium: Dubočica Stadium; Attendance: 1,389; Referee: Mohammed Al-Emara (Finland) |

| 14 December 2023 6 | Genk (Belgium) | 2–0 | (Serbia) Čukarički | Genk, Belgium |
| 18:45 CET (UTC+1) | Heynen 21'; Galarza (red card) 33'; Paintsil 57'; El Ouahdi (yellow card) 90+1' | Report | Sissoko (yellow card) 32'; Adžić (yellow card) 50'; Singh (yellow card) 90+3' | Stadium: Cegeka Arena; Attendance: 10,423; Referee: Trustin Farrugia Cann (Malta) |
