= 2024–25 AS Saint-Étienne season =

AS Saint-Étienne
2024–25 season
- Chairman: Ivan Gazidis
- Manager: Olivier Dall'Oglio (until 13 December 2024); Eirik Horneland (since 20 December 2024)
- Stadium: Stade Geoffroy-Guichard
- Ligue 1: 17th
- Coupe de France: Round of 64
- Top goalscorer: Lucas Stassin (12)
- Highest home attendance: Lyon (40,372) 20 April 2025
- Lowest home attendance: Nantes (14,094) 19 Jan. 2025
- Average home league attendance: 28,790
- Biggest win: Saint-Étienne 3–1 Reims
- Biggest defeat: Nice 8–0 Saint-Étienne
Home colours	Away colours
- All statistics correct as of 27 January 2025.

The 2024–25 season was the 92nd season in the history of AS Saint-Étienne. The season will see Saint-Étienne return to competing in Ligue 1 after winning the Ligue 2 qualifiers. In addition to the domestic league, the team is scheduled to participate in the Coupe de France.

== Squad ==
=== First-team squad ===
As of 18 February 2025.

Note: Flags indicate national team as defined under FIFA eligibility rules; some limited exceptions apply. Players may hold more than one non-FIFA nationality.

No.	Pos.	Nation	Player
1	GK	FRA	Brice Maubleu
3	DF	FRA	Mickaël Nadé
4	MF	FRA	Pierre Ekwah
5	DF	MAR	Yunis Abdelhamid
6	MF	MAR	Benjamin Bouchouari
7	FW	FRA	Irvin Cardona
8	DF	FRA	Dennis Appiah
9	FW	MLI	Ibrahim Sissoko
10	MF	FRA	Florian Tardieu
11	FW	NZL	Ben Old
13	DF	FRA	Maxime Bernauer
14	MF	FRA	Louis Mouton
16	GK	SEN	Boubacar Fall
17	DF	FRA	Pierre Cornud
19	DF	FRA	Léo Pétrot

No.	Pos.	Nation	Player
20	FW	GHA	Augustine Boakye
21	DF	COD	Dylan Batubinsika
22	FW	GEO	Zuriko Davitashvili
23	DF	FRA	Anthony Briançon
25	FW	SEN	Ibrahima Wadji
26	MF	FRA	Lamine Fomba
27	DF	FRA	Yvann Maçon
28	MF	SRB	Igor Miladinović
29	MF	MAR	Aïmen Moueffek
30	GK	FRA	Gautier Larsonneur
32	FW	BEL	Lucas Stassin

== Transfers ==
=== In ===
No.	Pos.	Player	Transferred from	Fee	Date	Source
5	DF	(Morocco) Yunis Abdelhamid	Unattached	Free	5 July 2024	
22	MF	(Georgia (country)) Zuriko Davitashvili	(France) Bordeaux	€5 million (Note: Up to €1 million in bonuses)	11 July 2024	
11	MF	(New Zealand) Ben Old	(New Zealand) Wellington Phoenix	Undisclosed	9 July 2024	
20	FW	(Ghana) Augustine Boakye	(Austria) Wolfsberger AC	€3 million (Note: Up to €2 million in bonuses)	13 July 2024	
28	MF	(Serbia) Igor Miladinović	(Serbia) Čukarički	€3 million	9 August 2024	
1	GK	(France) Brice Maubleu	(France) Grenoble	Undisclosed	21 August 2024	
17	DF	(France) Pierre Cornud	(Israel) Maccabi Haifa	€1.1 million	22 August 2024	
4	MF	(France) Pierre Ekwah	(England) Sunderland	Loan (Note: Includes an option to sign permanently for €7 million)	30 August 2024	
32	FW	(Belgium) Lucas Stassin	(Belgium) Westerlo	€9 million	30 August 2024	

=== Out ===
Pos.	Player	Transferred to	Fee	Date	Source
MF	(France) Nathanaël Mbuku	(Germany) FC Augsburg	Loan return	1 July 2024	
FW	(Ivory Coast) Stéphane Diarra	(France) Lorient	Loan return	1 July 2024	
FW	(France) Irvin Cardona	(Germany) FC Augsburg	Loan return	1 July 2024	
FW	(France) Maxence Rivera	(France) Dunkerque	Free	1 July 2024	
DF	(Cameroon) Bryan Nokoue	Released	Free	1 July 2024	
DF	(France) Darling Bladi	(France) Bourg-Péronnas	Loan	7 July 2024	
MF	(France) Dylan Chambost	(United States) Columbus Crew	Undisclosed	18 July 2024	
GK	(England) Etienne Green	(England) Burnley	Free	7 August 2024	
DF	(Morocco) Mahmoud Bentayg	(Egypt) Zamalek	Loan (Note: Includes an option to sign permanently)	31 August 2024	
MF	(Guinea) Karim Cissé	(France) Annecy	Loan	2 September 2024	
DF	(France) Beres Owusu	(France) Quevilly-Rouen	Loan	2 September 2024	
MF	(France) Mathis Amougou	(England) Chelsea	€15 million	4 February 2025	

== Friendlies ==
=== Pre-season ===
20 July 2024 Friendly	Clermont	1–1	Saint-Étienne	Puy-en-Velay
18:00	Douane 18'		Mouton 81'

27 July 2024 Friendly	Saint-Étienne	3–1	Villarreal	Thonon-les-Bains, France
	Davitashvili 45+2', 90+1'; Othman 61'	Report	Cardona 56'	Stadium: Stade Joseph-Moynat

31 July 2024 Friendly	Montpellier	1–2	Saint-Étienne

7 August 2024 Friendly	Getafe	1–0	Saint-Étienne	Getafe, Spain
20:00				Stadium: Coliseum

== Competitions ==
=== Overall record ===
Competition	First match	Last match	Starting round	Final position	Record							
Competition	First match	Last match	Starting round	Final position	Pld	W	D	L	GF	GA	GD	Win %
Ligue 1	17 August 2024	May 2025	Matchday 1	17th	34	8	6	20	39	77	−38	23.53
Coupe de France	22 December 2025	22 December 2025	Round of 16	Round of 16	1	0	0	1	0	4	−4	0.00
Total					35	8	6	21	39	81	−42	22.86

Last updated: 2 June 2025
Source: Soccerway

=== Ligue 1 ===
==== League table ====
Pos	Team	Pld	W	D	L	GF	GA	GD	Pts	Qualification or relegation
14	Angers	34	10	6	18	32	53	−21	36	
15	Le Havre	34	10	4	20	40	71	−31	34	
16	Reims (R)	34	8	9	17	33	47	−14	33	Qualification for the relegation play-offs
17	Saint-Étienne (R)	34	8	6	20	39	77	−38	30	Relegation to Ligue 2
18	Montpellier (R)	34	4	4	26	23	79	−56	16	Relegation to Ligue 2

Source: Ligue 1
Rules for classification: 1) Points; 2) Goal difference; 3) Head-to-head points; 4) Head-to-head goal difference; 5) Head-to-head goals scored; 6) Head-to-head away goals scored; 7) Goals scored; 8) Away goals scored; 9) Fair-play points (Note: Head-to-head record is used only after all the matches between the teams in question have been played).
(R) Relegated

==== Results summary ====
Overall								Home						Away					
Pld	W	D	L	GF	GA	GD	Pts	W	D	L	GF	GA	GD	W	D	L	GF	GA	GD
34	8	6	20	39	77	−38	30	6	3	8	24	33	−9	2	3	12	15	44	−29

Last updated: 4 June 2025.
Source: Ligue 1

==== Results by round ====
Round	1	2	3	4	5	6	7	8	9	10	11	12	13	14	15	16	17	18	19	20	21	22	23	24	25	26	27	28	29	30	31	32	33	34
Ground	A	H	A	H	A	A	H	H	A	H	A	H	A	H	A	H	A	H	A	H	A	H	H	H	A	A	H	A	H	H	A	H	A	H
Result	L	L	L	W	L	D	W	L	L	W	L	W	L	L	L	W	L	D	D	L	L	D	L	L	D	W	L	L	D	W	L	L	W	L
Position	14	16	18	16	17	17	13	15	16	16	16	13	15	16	16	15	16	16	15	16	16	16	17	17	17	16	17	17	17	17	17	17	17	17

Updated to match(es) played on 17 May 2025. Source: Ligue 1
A = Away; H = Home; W = Win; D = Draw; L = Loss

==== Matches ====
The league schedule was released on 21 June 2024.

Win Draw Loss

17 August 2024 1	Monaco	1–0	Saint-Étienne	Monaco
21:00 CEST (UTC+2)	Minamino 28'; Embolo (yellow card) 90+5'	Report	Nzuzi (yellow card) 67'	Stadium: Stade Louis II; Attendance: 14,252; Referee: Clément Turpin

24 August 2024 2	Saint-Étienne	0–2	Le Havre	Saint-Étienne
21:00 CEST (UTC+2)	Nzuzi (yellow card) 33'; Cafaro (yellow card) 40'; Larsonneur (yellow card) 57'	Report	Sangante (yellow card) 40', (goal) 68'; Casimir (yellow card) 42'; Touré 57' (pen.); Ndiaye (yellow card) 90'	Stadium: Stade Geoffroy-Guichard; Attendance: 16,958; Referee: Florent Batta

31 August 2024 3	Brest	4–0	Saint-Étienne	Brest
17:00 CEST (UTC+2)	Camara 10'; Del Castillo 32' (pen.); Ajorque 77'; Lala 84' (pen.)	Report	Fomba (yellow card) 30'; Maçon (yellow card) 56'; Batubinsika (yellow card) 66'; Cafaro (yellow card) 80'; Cornud (yellow card) 82'	Stadium: Stade Francis-Le Blé; Attendance: 14,885; Referee: Gaël Angoula

13 September 2024 4	Saint-Étienne	1–0	Lille	Saint-Étienne
20:45 CEST (UTC+2)	Cafaro 6'; Cornud (yellow card) 61'	Report	André (yellow card) 54'	Stadium: Stade Geoffroy-Guichard; Attendance: 22,144; Referee: François Letexier

20 September 2024 5	Nice	8–0	Saint-Étienne	Nice
20:45 CEST (UTC+2)	Batubinsika 4' (o.g.); Ndombele 7'; Cho 24'; Moukoko 26' 39'; Guessand 36'; Diop 75'; Rosario 86' (pen.)	Report	Ekwah (yellow card) 22'	Stadium: Allianz Riviera; Attendance: 23,106; Referee: Thomas Léonard

29 September 2024 6	Nantes	2–2	Saint-Étienne	Nantes
17:00 CEST (UTC+2)	Lepenant 10'; Thomas 49'; Abline (yellow card) 53'; Castelletto (yellow card) 65'; Coco (red card) 90+8'	Report	Sissoko 57', 67' (pen.); Amougou (yellow card) 73'; Larsonneur (yellow card) 90+7'	Stadium: Stade de la Beaujoire; Attendance: 34,005; Referee: Abdelatif Kherradji

5 October 2024 7	Saint-Étienne	3–1	Auxerre	Saint-Étienne
17:00 CEST (UTC+2)	Davitashvili 15', 54', 86'; Nadé (yellow card) 47'; Ekwah (yellow card) 67'; Pétrot (yellow card) 79'	Report	Owusu (yellow card) 35'; Bair 74'	Stadium: Stade Geoffroy-Guichard; Attendance: 31,445; Referee: Mathieu Vernice

19 October 2024 8	Saint-Étienne	0–2	Lens	Saint-Étienne
19:00 CEST (UTC+2)	Nadé (yellow card) 60'; Amougou (yellow card) 61'	Report	Frankowski 20'; Medina (yellow card) 31'; Nzola (yellow card) 56'; Labeau Lascary 79'	Stadium: Stade Geoffroy-Guichard; Attendance: 36,832; Referee: Romain Lissorgue

26 October 2024 9	Angers	4–2	Saint-Étienne	Angers
17:00 CEST (UTC+2)	Abdelli 7'; Belkhdim (yellow card) 34'; Aholou 39'; Niane 69' (pen.); Dieng 90+3'	Report	Davitashvili 16' (pen.), 57'; Abdelhamid (yellow card) 29'; Boakye (yellow card) 38'; Cafaro (yellow card) 71'	Stadium: Stade Raymond Kopa; Attendance: 13,796; Referee: Marc Bollengier

2 November 2024 10	Saint-Étienne	2–0	Strasbourg	Saint-Étienne
21:00 CET (UTC+1)	Pétrot (yellow card) 40'; Mouton (yellow card) 47'; Nadé 51'; Sissoko 65'	Report	Sarr (yellow card) 26'	Stadium: Stade Geoffroy-Guichard; Attendance: 33,043; Referee: Eric Wattellier

10 November 2024 11	Lyon	1–0	Saint-Étienne	Décines-Charpieu
20:45 CET (UTC+1)	Lacazette 29'; Ćaleta-Car (yellow card) 40'; Fofana (yellow card) 85'; Perri (yellow card) 90+5'	Report	Stassin (yellow card) 33'; Boakye (yellow card) 34'	Stadium: Parc Olympique Lyonnais; Attendance: 58,082; Referee: Willy Delajod

23 November 2024 12	Saint-Étienne	1–0	Montpellier	Saint-Étienne
19:00 CET (UTC+1)	Bouchouari 47' (yellow card) 64'; Davitashvili (yellow card) 57'; Boakye (yellow card) 62'	Report	Chotard (yellow card) 28'; Nzingoula (yellow card) 34'; Tchato (yellow card) 41'; Sylla (yellow card) 56'; Al-Taamari (yellow card) 56'	Stadium: Stade Geoffroy-Guichard; Attendance: 33,008; Referee: Florent Batta

30 November 2024 13	Rennes	5–0	Saint-Étienne	Rennes
17:00 CET (UTC+1)	Kalimuendo 39' (pen.); Blas 45+6'; Gouiri 53'; Kalimuendo 61'; Kalimuendo 67' (pen.)	Report	Cafaro (red card) 37'; Larsonneur (yellow card) 81'	Stadium: Roazhon Park; Attendance: 27,586; Referee: Marc Bollengier

8 December 2024 14	Saint-Étienne	0–2	Marseille	Saint-Étienne
20:45 CET (UTC+1)	Sissoko (yellow card) 90+9'	Report	Rabiot 17'; Rongier (yellow card) 47'; Greenwood 65'	Stadium: Stade Geoffroy-Guichard; Attendance: 35,350; Referee: Jérôme Brisard

13 December 2024 15	Toulouse	2–1	Saint-Étienne	Toulouse
20:45 CET (UTC+1)	Sierro (yellow card) 19'; King (yellow card) 49'; Babicka 55'; Cásseres Jr. (yellow card) 63'; Aboukhlal 85'	Report	Bouchouari (yellow card) 10'; Abdelhamid (yellow card) 49'; Stassin 53' (yellow card) 61'; Appiah (yellow card) 61'	Stadium: Stadium de Toulouse; Attendance: 25,336; Referee: Thomas Léonard

4 January 2025 16	Saint-Étienne	3–1	Reims	Saint-Étienne
17:00 CET (UTC+1)	Boakye 50', 57' (yellow card) 73'; Stassin 80'; Pétrot (yellow card) 90+2'	Report	Nakamura 42'; Buta (yellow card) 66'	Stadium: Stade Geoffroy-Guichard; Attendance: 14,201; Referee: Stéphanie Frappart

12 January 2025 17	Paris Saint-Germain	2–1	Saint-Étienne	Paris
20:45 CET (UTC+1)	Dembélé 13', 23' (pen.); Beraldo (yellow card) 62'	Report	Mouton (yellow card) 58'; Davitashvili 64'; Bouchouari (yellow card) 75'	Stadium: Parc des Princes; Attendance: 47,580; Referee: Benoît Millot

19 January 2025 18	Saint-Étienne	1–1	Nantes	Saint-Étienne
15:00 CET (UTC+1)	Larsonneur (yellow card) 22'; Batubinsika (yellow card) 41'; Boakye 86'	Report	Simon 14'; Chirivella (yellow card) 39'	Stadium: Stade Geoffroy-Guichard; Attendance: 14,094; Referee: Florent Batta

24 January 2025 19	Auxerre	1–1	Saint-Étienne	Auxerre
20:45 CET (UTC+1)	Traorè 27'; Jubal (yellow card) 68'; Massengo (yellow card) 84'	Report	Stassin 45'	Stadium: Stade de l'Abbé-Deschamps; Attendance: 16,805; Referee: Marc Bollengier

1 February 2025 20	Lille	4–1	Saint-Étienne	Villeneuve-d'Ascq
21:05 CET (UTC+01)	David 32' (pen.); Gudmundsson (yellow card) 62' (goal) 72'; Sahraoui 63', 78'	Report	Davitashvili 6' (pen.); Batubinsika (red card) 48'; Boakye (yellow card) 50'	Stadium: Stade Pierre-Mauroy; Attendance: 38,924; Referee: Eric Wattellier

8 February 2025 21	Saint-Étienne	0–2	Rennes	Saint-Étienne
21:05 CET (UTC+1)	Ekwah (yellow card) 68'	Report	Wooh (yellow card) 12'; Kalimuendo 15'; James (yellow card) 17'; Blas (yellow card) 23'; Fofana (yellow card) 64'; Samba (yellow card) 77'; Nagida 84'	Stadium: Stade Geoffroy-Guichard; Attendance: 30,385; Referee: Mathieu Vernice

15 February 2025 22	Marseille	5–1	Saint-Étienne	Marseille
17:00 CET (UTC+1)	Gouiri 27', 60'; Greenwood 50' (pen.); Murillo 58'; Cornelius (yellow card) 68'; Rabiot 77'	Report	Stassin (yellow card) 15' (goal) 79'	Stadium: Stade Vélodrome; Attendance: 66,199; Referee: Abdelatif Kherradji

22 February 2025 23	Saint-Étienne	3–3	Angers	Saint-Étienne
19:00 CET (UTC+1)	Batubinsika (yellow card) 5'; Maçon (yellow card) 26'; Cardona 36', 73'; Ekwah 52'; Bernauer (yellow card) 90+1'	Report	Abdelli 7' (pen.), 17'; Dieng 90+4' (pen.)	Stadium: Stade Geoffroy-Guichard; Attendance: 30,566; Referee: Bastien Dechepy

1 March 2025 24	Saint-Étienne	1–3	Nice	Saint-Étienne
17:00 CET (UTC+1)	Cardona (yellow card) 5'; Stassin 32'; Bernauer (yellow card) 90+4'	Report	Clauss (yellow card) 6'; Rosario 10'; Nadé 52' (o.g.); Guessand 69'	Stadium: Stade Geoffroy-Guichard; Attendance: 30,070; Referee: Jérôme Brisard

9 March 2025 25	Le Havre	1–1	Saint-Étienne	Le Havre
17:15 CET (UTC+1)	Lloris (yellow card) 22'; Zouaoui (yellow card) 32'; Touré (penalty missed) 45+1', 45+1'	Report	Stassin 10'; Cardona (yellow card) 45+3'; Moueffek (yellow card) 50'; Fomba (yellow card) 90+4'	Stadium: Stade Océane; Attendance: 22,239; Referee: Clément Turpin

16 March 2025 26	Montpellier	0–2; Awarded	Saint-Étienne	Montpellier
18:15 CEST (UTC+2)	Savanier (yellow card) 15'	Report	Davitashvili (yellow card) 7'; Bernauer (yellow card) 9' (yellow-red card) 45'; Stassin 11', 53'	Stadium: Stade de la Mosson; Attendance: 14,358; Referee: François Letexier
Note: The game was abandoned in the 62nd minute following a 20-minute suspension after home fans threw flares on to the pitch and part of a stand caught fire. Three weeks later, the Professional Football League validated the victory achieved in Montpellier by AS Saint-Etienne.

29 March 2025 27	Saint-Étienne	1–6	Paris Saint-Germain	Saint-Étienne
19:00 CET (UTC+1)	Stassin 9'; Bouchouari (yellow card) 26'; Maçon (yellow card) 68'	Report	Ramos 43' (pen.); Kvaratskhelia 50'; Doué 53', 66'; Neves 62'; Mbaye 90'	Stadium: Stade Geoffroy-Guichard; Attendance: 37,108; Referee: Jérémy Stinat

6 April 2025 28	Lens	1–0	Saint-Étienne	Lens
15:00 CET (UTC+1)	Machado (yellow card) 19'; Medina (yellow card) 30'; Koyalipou 75'; Ojediran (yellow card) 65'	Report	Maçon (yellow card) 32'; Bouchouari (yellow card) 65'	Stadium: Stade Bollaert-Delelis; Attendance: 38,223; Referee: Romain Lissorgue

13 April 2025 29	Saint-Étienne	3–3	Brest	Saint-Étienne
15:00 CEST (UTC+2)	Stassin 16'; Moueffek (yellow card) 18'; Cardona 34', 80'; Larsonneur (yellow card) 71'	Report	Ajorque 6', 37'; Sima 25'; Chardonnet (yellow card) 60'; Lees-Melou (yellow card) 78'; Baldé (yellow card) 83'; Bizot (yellow card) 90+4'	Stadium: Stade Geoffroy-Guichard; Attendance: 32,834; Referee: Abdelatif Kherradji

20 April 2025 30	Saint-Étienne	2–1	Lyon	Saint-Étienne
20:45 CEST (UTC+2)	Stassin 10', (yellow card) 24', (goal) 67'; Pétrot (yellow card) 78'; Appiah (yellow card) 79'	Report	Lacazette (yellow card) 27'; Akouokou (yellow card) 32'; Mikautadze (yellow card) 52'; Tessmann 76'; Mata (yellow card) 90+2'	Stadium: Stade Geoffroy-Guichard; Attendance: 40,372; Referee: François Letexier

26 April 2025 31	Strasbourg	3–1	Saint-Étienne	Strasbourg
17:00	Moreira 7'; Omobamidele (yellow card) 37'; Emegha 63'; Bakwa 83'	Report	Davitashvili 19'	Stadium: Stade de la Meinau; Attendance: 19,603; Referee: Benoît Bastien

3 May 2025 32	Saint-Étienne	1–3	Monaco	Saint-Étienne
21:05 CEST (UTC+2)	Davitashvili 65'	Report	Akliouche 2', 68'; Balogun 78'	Stadium: Stade Geoffroy-Guichard; Attendance: 37,757; Referee: Jérôme Brisard

10 May 2025 33	Reims	0–2	Saint-Étienne	Reims
21:00 CEST (UTC+2)	Koné (yellow card) 52'	Report	Tardieu 3'; Cardona 41'	Stadium: Stade Auguste-Delaune; Attendance: 18,630; Referee: Éric Wattellier

17 May 2025 34	Saint-Étienne	2–3	Toulouse	Saint-Étienne
21:00 CEST (UTC+2)	Wadji (yellow card) 30'; Tardieu 38'; Batubinsika 63'; Davitashvili (yellow card) 70'; Bouchouari (yellow card) 82'	Report	Kamanzi 10'; King 15'; Gboho 58'; Cásseres Jr. (yellow card) 70'; Restes (yellow card) 90'	Stadium: Stade Geoffroy-Guichard; Attendance: 38,725; Referee: Thomas Léonard

=== Coupe de France ===
22 December 2024 Round of 64	Saint-Étienne	0–4	Marseille	Saint-Étienne
14:45 CET (UTC+1)	Sissoko (red card) 21'; Cafaro (yellow card) 24'; Mouton (yellow card) 42'; Ekwah (yellow card) 59'; Abdelhamid (yellow card) 74'; Miladinović (yellow card) 90'	Report	Greenwood 22'; Rabiot 34'; Luis Henrique 69'; Rowe (yellow card) 74'; Højbjerg 81'	Stadium: Stade Geoffroy-Guichard; Attendance: 34,547; Referee: Jérémy Stinat
