= Igor Miladinović =

Igor Miladinović is a name. People with that name include:

- Igor Miladinović (chess player), Serbian chess grandmaster
- Igor Miladinović (footballer, born 1989), Serbian footballer
- Igor Miladinović (footballer, born 2003), Serbian footballer
