= 2023–24 KVC Westerlo season =

K.V.C. Westerlo
2023–24 season
- Chairman: Oktay Ercan
- Manager: Jonas De Roeck (from 2 December); Rik De Mil (from 12 December to 19 March); Bart Goor (from 19 March)
- Stadium: Het Kuipje
- Belgian Pro League: 11th
- Belgian Cup: Seventh round
- Top goalscorer: League: Nicolas Madsen (13); All: Nicolas Madsen (14)
- Biggest win: Westerlo 3–0 RWD Molenbeek
- Biggest defeat: Westerlo 0–3 Antwerp

The 2023–24 season was K.V.C. Westerlo's 91st season in existence and second consecutive in the Belgian Pro League. They also competed in the Belgian Cup.

== Players ==
=== First-team squad ===
As of 1 February 2024

Note: Flags indicate national team as defined under FIFA eligibility rules; some limited exceptions apply. Players may hold more than one non-FIFA nationality.

No.	Pos.	Nation	Player
1	GK	TUR	Sinan Bolat
2	DF	BEL	Pietro Perdichizzi
4	MF	BEL	Mathias Fixelles
5	DF	AUS	Jordan Bos
6	MF	TUR	Doğucan Haspolat
8	MF	DEN	Nicolas Madsen
9	FW	CRO	Matija Frigan
14	FW	BEL	Kyan Vaesen
15	MF	UKR	Serhiy Sydorchuk
17	FW	BEL	Romeo Vermant (on loan from Brugge)
18	MF	USA	Griffin Yow
19	FW	BEL	Irsan Muric
20	GK	BEL	Nick Gillekens
22	DF	USA	Bryan Reynolds

No.	Pos.	Nation	Player
24	DF	TUR	Ravil Tagir (on loan from İstanbul Başakşehir)
25	DF	BEL	Tuur Rommens
28	MF	POL	Karol Borys
30	GK	BEL	Koen Van Langendonck
32	DF	BUL	Edisson Jordanov
33	DF	RUS	Roman Neustädter
34	FW	MAR	Ilias El Hari
39	MF	BEL	Thomas Van den Keybus
40	DF	TUR	Emin Bayram (on loan from Galatasaray)
46	DF	BEL	Arthur Piedfort
76	FW	BEL	Lucas Stassin
77	FW	CRC	Josimar Alcócer
89	MF	BEL	Nacer Chadli
90	FW	IRI	Allahyar Sayyadmanesh

=== Out on loan ===
Note: Flags indicate national team as defined under FIFA eligibility rules; some limited exceptions apply. Players may hold more than one non-FIFA nationality.

No.	Pos.	Nation	Player
—	DF	BEL	Rubin Seigers (at Zulte Waregem until 30 June 2024)
—	MF	SVK	Ján Bernát (at Spartak Trnava until 30 June 2024)
—	MF	GUI	Sékou Camara (at Houtvenne until 30 June 2024)
—	MF	TUR	Muhammed Gümüşkaya (at Samsunspor until 30 June 2024)

No.	Pos.	Nation	Player
—	MF	BEL	Simon Paulet (at Olympic Charleroi until 30 June 2024)
—	FW	MKD	Erdon Daci (at Beveren until 30 June 2024)
—	FW	CIV	Fernand Gouré (at DAC Dunajská Streda until 30 June 2024)
—	FW	SCO	Adedire Mebude (at Bristol City until 30 June 2024)

== Pre-season and friendlies ==
Win Draw Loss

1 July 2023 Friendly	Westerlo (Belgium)	2–2	(Belgium) Sint-Truiden	Westerlo
16:00				Stadium: Het Kuipje

11 July 2023 Friendly	PEC Zwolle (Netherlands)	3–1	(Belgium) Westerlo	Zwolle, Netherlands
19:00	Van der Haar 58'; Görlich 64'; Vellios 89'		Yow 51'	Stadium: Sportpark de Elshof

12 July 2023 Friendly	SC Heerenveen (Netherlands)	0–2	(Belgium) Westerlo
15:00			Vaesen 88'; ? 118'
Note: Match was played in two periods of 60 minutes.

16 July 2023 Friendly	Westerlo (Belgium)	3–2	(Greece) PAOK	Dessel
16:00	Matsu 14'; Yow 15'; Daci 64'		Narey 5'; Thomas 17'	Stadium: Armand Melis Stadion

22 July 2023 Friendly	Westerlo (Belgium)	2–1	(Netherlands) Willem II	Westerlo
18:00	Daci 3'; Fixelles 25'		Soree 79'	Stadium: Het Kuipje

23 September 2023 Friendly	Patro Eisden (Belgium)	0–0	(Belgium) Westerlo
11:00

13 October 2023 Friendly	Westerlo (Belgium)	4–2	(Belgium) Lierse Kempenzonen
13:00

14 November 2023 Friendly	Westerlo (Belgium)	1–3	(Belgium) Sint-Truiden
13:00

12 January 2024 Friendly	Westerlo (Belgium)	2–2	(Germany) 1. FC Bocholt	Turkey
09:00

12 January 2024 Friendly	Rapid București (Romania)	2–3	(Belgium) Westerlo	Antalya, Turkey
15:00				Stadium: Mardan 2. Stadı

== Competitions ==
=== Overall record ===
Competition	First match	Last match	Starting round	Final position	Record							
Competition	First match	Last match	Starting round	Final position	Pld	W	D	L	GF	GA	GD	Win %
Belgian Pro League	29 July 2023	17 March 2024	Matchday 1	11th	30	7	9	14	42	54	−12	23.33
Europe Play-offs	31 March 2024	25 May 2024	Matchday 1		9	1	3	5	12	20	−8	11.11
Belgian Cup	1 November 2023		Seventh round	Seventh round	1	0	0	1	1	3	−2	0.00
Total					40	8	12	20	55	77	−22	20.00

Source: Soccerway

=== Belgian Pro League ===
==== League table ====
Pos	Team	Pld	W	D	L	GF	GA	GD	Pts	Qualification or relegation
9	Sint-Truiden	30	10	10	10	35	46	−11	40	Qualification for the Europe play-offs
10	Standard Liège	30	8	10	12	33	41	−8	34	Qualification for the Europe play-offs
11	Westerlo	30	7	9	14	42	54	−12	30	Qualification for the Europe play-offs
12	OH Leuven	30	7	8	15	34	47	−13	29	Qualification for the Europe play-offs
13	Charleroi	30	7	8	15	26	48	−22	29	Qualification for the relegation play-offs

Source: Jupiler Pro League (in Dutch), Soccerway
Rules for classification: 1) Points; 2) Matches won; 3) Goal difference; 4) Goals scored; 5) Away matches won; 6) Away goal difference; 7) Away goals scored; 8) Play-off.

==== Results summary ====
Overall								Home						Away					
Pld	W	D	L	GF	GA	GD	Pts	W	D	L	GF	GA	GD	W	D	L	GF	GA	GD
30	7	9	14	42	54	−12	30	5	2	8	21	27	−6	2	7	6	21	27	−6

Source: Worldfootball

==== Results by round ====
Round	1	2	3	4	5	6	7	8	9	10	11	12	13	14	15	16	17	18	19	20	21	22	23	24	25	26	27	28	29	30
Ground	A	H	H	A	H	A	H	A	A	H	A	H	A	H	A	H	A	H	A	H	A	A	H	H	A	H	A	H	A	H
Result	D	L	L	L	L	L	L	D	D	W	D	L	W	D	L	L	W	W	D	W	L	D	W	L	D	W	L	L	L	D
Position	6	11	14	15	15	15	16	15	16	15	16	16	15	15	15	15	14	13	12	11	11	11	10	10	11	10	10	11	11	11

Source: Worldfootball
A = Away; H = Home; W = Win; D = Draw; L = Loss

==== Matches ====
The league fixtures were unveiled on 22 June 2023.

8 December 2023 17	Kortrijk	1–2	Westerlo	Kortrijk
20:45		Report		Stadium: Guldensporen Stadion; Referee: Brent Staessens

15 December 2023 18	Westerlo	2–0	Eupen	Westerlo
20:45	Madsen 61', 67' (pen.)	Report		Stadium: Het Kuipje; Referee: Wesli De Cremer

23 December 2023 19	Antwerp	2–2	Westerlo	Antwerp
18:15	Muja 45+1'; Alderweireld 85'	Report	Stasin 71', 77'	Stadium: Bosuilstadion; Referee: Bram Van Driessche

26 December 2023 20	Westerlo	3–0	RWDM	Westerlo
18:30	Yow 14'; Madsen 64' (pen.); Gécé 82' (o.g.)	Report	Defourny (red card) 70'	Stadium: Het Kuipje; Referee: Wim Smet

20 January 2024 21	Club Brugge	v	Westerlo	Bruges
20:45				Stadium: Jan Breydel Stadium

27 January 2024 22	Gent	v	Westerlo	Ghent
20:45				Stadium: Ghelamco Arena

==== Matches ====
31 March 2024 1	Sint-Truiden	2–0	Westerlo	Sint-Truiden
18:30	Steuckers 8', 84'	Report	Jordanov (yellow card) 76'	Stadium: Stayen; Attendance: 3,895; Referee: Brent Staessens

7 April 2024 2	Westerlo	0–3	Gent	Westerlo
19:15	Haidara (yellow card) 6' (yellow-red card) 37'; Haspolat (yellow card) 27'; Rommens (yellow card) 61'; Gillekens (red card) 67'; Stassin (yellow card) 84'	Report	De Sart (yellow card) 8'; Gandelman 22', 90+2'; Tissoudali 24', (yellow card) 68'	Stadium: Het Kuipje; Attendance: 4,698; Referee: Wim Smet

13 April 2024 3	Mechelen	3–2	Westerlo	Mechelen
18:15	Cobbaut 56'; Slimani 66'; Tagir 90+3' (o.g.); Bassette (yellow card) 90+5'	Report	Alcócer 27'; Vermant 29', (yellow card) 45+4' (yellow-red card) 45+4'; Rommens (yellow card) 45+5'; Madsen (yellow card) 90+2'	Stadium: AFAS Stadion; Referee: Arthur Denil

20 April 2024 4	Westerlo	3–3	Standard Liège	Westerlo
18:15	Frigan 29'; Stassin 49'; Yow 59' (pen.); Reynolds (yellow card) 62'	Report	Kanga 22'; Kawabe (yellow card) 73'; Alzate 78'; Laifis 90+4'	Stadium: Het Kuipje; Referee: Simon Bourdeaud'Hui

23 April 2024 5	Westerlo	1–1	OH Leuven	Westerlo
20:30	Haspolat (yellow card) 10'; Tagir 25'; Gillekens (yellow card) 83'	Report	Sagrado (yellow card) 70'; Banzuzi (yellow card) 72'; Gillekens 77' (o.g.); Russo (yellow card) 83'	Stadium: Het Kuipje; Referee: Wesli De Cremer

27 April 2024 6	Gent	3–2	Westerlo	Ghent
20:45	Gandelman 19'; Fernandez-Pardo 21'; De Sart 64'; Mitrović (yellow card) 74'; Torunarigha (yellow card) 84'	Report	Stassin 1', (yellow card) 54'; Madsen 34'; Haspolat (yellow card) 54'; Tagir (yellow card) 80'	Stadium: Planet Group Arena; Referee: Brent Staessens

3 May 2024 7	Westerlo	2–2	Sint-Truiden	Westerlo
20:45	Bos 32'; Reynolds (yellow card) 42'; Stassin 47'; Sydorchuk (yellow card) 68'	Report	Ito 8'; Ananou (yellow card) 21'; Godeau (yellow card) 64'; Bertaccini 69'	Stadium: Het Kuipje; Referee: Simon Bourdeaud'Hui

10 May 2024 8	Standard Liège	v	Westerlo	Liège
				Stadium: Stade Maurice Dufrasne

18 May 2024 9	Westerlo	0–2	Mechelen	Westerlo
18:15		Report	Bafdili 25'; Belghali 90'	Stadium: Het Kuipje; Referee: Matonga Simonini

25 May 2024 10	OH Leuven	1–2	Westerlo	Leuven
20:30	Ricca (red card) 25'; Þorsteinsson 52'; Russo (yellow card) 45+4' (yellow-red card) 68'		Vaesen 33'; Tagir 45+3'	Stadium: Den Dreef; Referee: Ken Vermeiren

=== Belgian Cup ===
1 November 2023 Seventh round	Beveren	3–1	Westerlo	Beveren
20:00	Coopman 5'; Hrnčár 45+6'; Koyalipou 81' (pen.)	Report	Madsen 90+2' (pen.)	Stadium: Freethiel Stadion; Referee: Quentin Pirard
