= Mathis Amougou =

French footballer (born 2006)

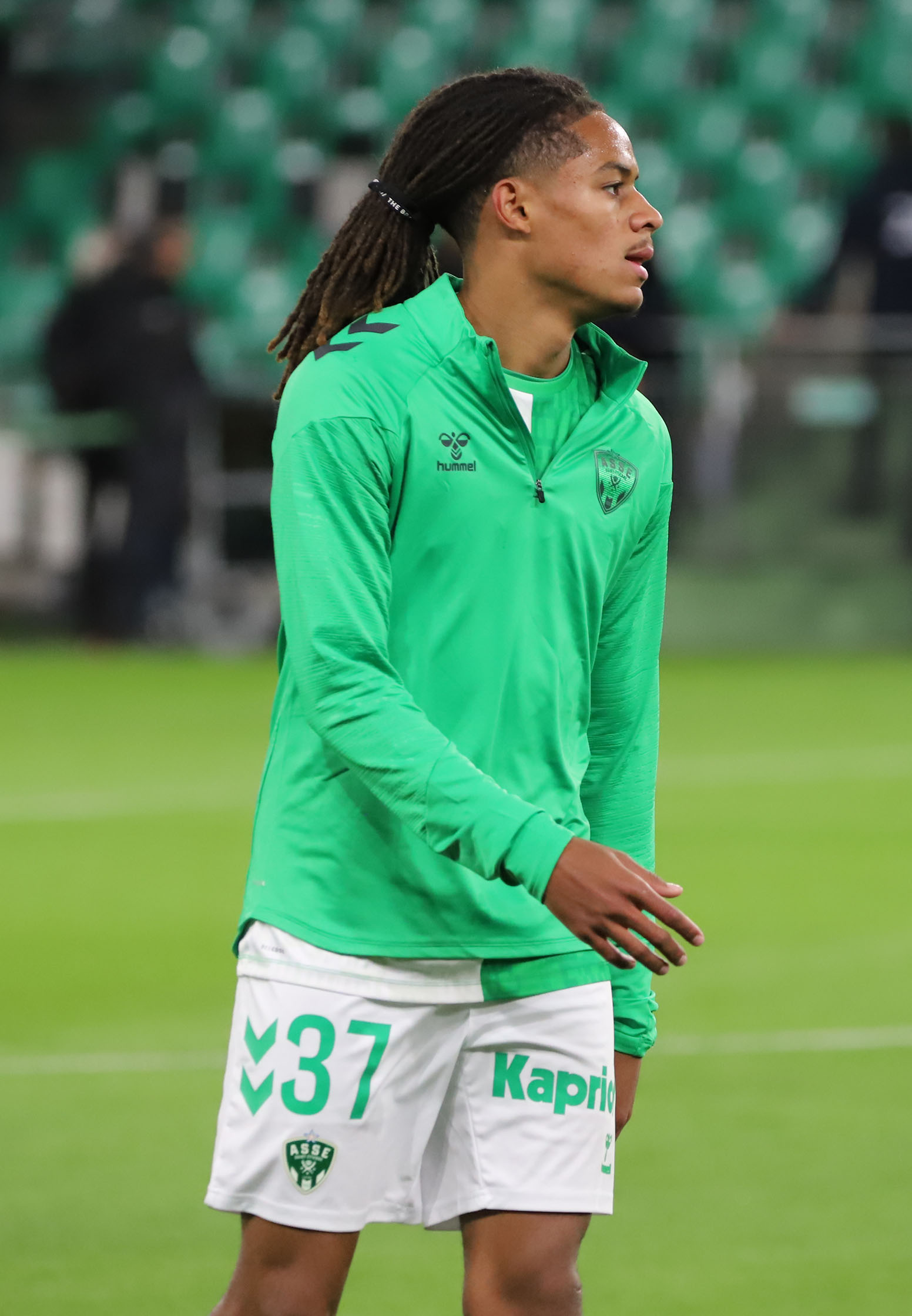
- Amougou with Saint-Étienne in 2024

Personal information
- Full name: Mathis Amougou
- Date of birth: 18 January 2006 (age 20)
- Place of birth: Le Blanc-Mesnil, France
- Height: 1.77 m (5 ft 10 in)
- Position: Midfielder

Team information
- Current team: Toulouse (on loan from Strasbourg)
- Number: 18

Youth career
- 2012–2014: Entente Brie Est
- 2014–2021: Torcy
- 2021–2022: Saint-Étienne

Senior career*
Years	Team	Apps	(Gls)
2022–2025	Saint-Étienne II	21	(3)
2023–2025	Saint-Étienne	18	(0)
2025	Chelsea	1	(0)
2025–	Strasbourg	12	(0)
2026–	→ Toulouse (loan)	0	(0)

International career^{‡}
2022	France U16	1	(0)
2022–2023	France U17	10	(3)
2023	France U18	8	(2)
2024–2025	France U19	13	(0)
2024	France U20	1	(1)
Medal record
Men's football
Representing France
UEFA European Under-19 Championship
Runner-up	2024 Northern Ireland
FIFA U-17 World Cup
Runner-up	2023 Indonesia
- * Club domestic league appearances and goals as of 3 September 2026 ‡ National team caps and goals as of 25 March 2025

Mathis Amougou (born 18 January 2006) is a French professional footballer who plays as a midfielder for Ligue 1 club Toulouse on loan from Strasbourg.

== Early life ==
Born in Le Blanc-Mesnil, Amougou has three brothers; one elder, a twin and one younger, all of whom also play football. He first took an interest in football as a child, accompanying his elder brother to his football training sessions in Sevran, though he was not able to register with any club as he was too young.

== Club career ==
=== Early career ===
After his family moved to La Ferté-Gaucher, Amougou began his career with local side Entente Brie Est, spending two seasons before a move to Torcy in 2014. While at Torcy, he was also enrolled at the prestigious football academy INF Clairefontaine.

=== Saint-Étienne ===
Amougou who had already been training with the academy of professional side Saint-Étienne, moved officially in July 2021.

After a year playing youth football with Saint-Étienne, he was promoted to the club's second team, competing in the Championnat National 3. Mid-way through his first season in senior football, in April 2023, he signed his first professional contract with the club, penning a two-year deal.

After making his senior debut on 13 January 2024 in a goalless draw against Laval in Ligue 2, he established himself as a more regular starter during the first half of the 2024–25 Ligue 1.

=== Chelsea ===
On 3 February 2025, Amougou signed an eight-year contract with Premier League club Chelsea, for a reported transfer fee of €15 million. On 26 February, he made his debut as a substitute in a match against Southampton.

=== Strasbourg ===
On 12 July 2025, Amougou signed a reported five-year contract with Ligue 1 club Strasbourg.

On 1 September 2026, he was loaned by Toulouse.

== International career ==
Of Cameroonian descent, Amougou is eligible to represent both Cameroon and France at international level. In 2022, following impressive performances for Saint-Étienne's youth team, French national youth coach Jean-Luc Vannuchi called him up for a double-header against Germany, and he made his under-16 debut in the second of these two games.

Despite this being his only appearance for the under-16 squad, he remained a player of interest for Vannuchi, and having impressed at both under-17 and under-18 level, he was called up to the squad for the 2023 FIFA U-17 World Cup. In France's second game against South Korea, Amougou's goal in the 2nd-minute lead France to a 1–0 win, ensuring his nation progressed to the knockout stages.

== Career statistics ==
=== Club ===
As of match played 10 May 2026

Appearances and goals by club, season and competition
Club	Season	League			National cup (Note: Includes Coupe de France)		Europe		Other		Total	
Club	Season	Division	Apps	Goals	Apps	Goals	Apps	Goals	Apps	Goals	Apps	Goals
Saint-Étienne II	2022–23	Championnat National 3	8	1	—		—		—		8	1
Saint-Étienne II	2023–24	Championnat National 3	12	2	—		—		—		12	2
Saint-Étienne II	2024–25	Championnat National 3	1	0	—		—		—		1	0
Saint-Étienne II	Total		21	3	—		—		—		21	3
Saint-Étienne	2023–24	Ligue 2	1	0	1	0	—		—		2	0
Saint-Étienne	2024–25	Ligue 1	17	0	0	0	—		—		17	0
Saint-Étienne	Total		18	0	1	0	—		—		19	0
Chelsea	2024–25	Premier League	1	0	0	0	1 (Note: Appearances in UEFA Conference League)	0	0	0	2	0
Strasbourg	2025–26	Ligue 1	12	0	2	0	5	0	0	0	19	0
Career total			53	3	3	0	5	0	0	0	61	3

== Honours ==
Chelsea

- UEFA Conference League: 2024–25

France U17

- FIFA U-17 World Cup runner-up: 2023

France U19

- UEFA European Under-19 Championship runner-up: 2024

Individual

- FIFA U-17 World Cup Bronze Ball: 2023
