= Brice Maubleu =

French footballer (born 1989)

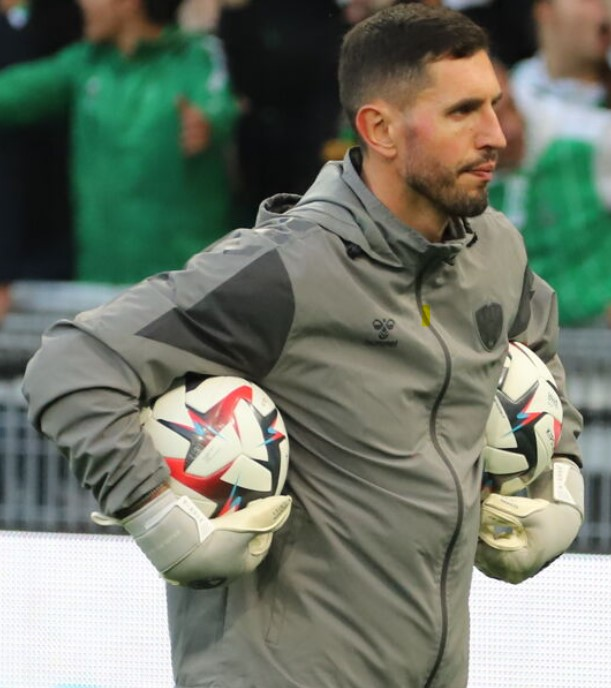
- Maubleu in 2024

Personal information
- Date of birth: 1 December 1989 (age 36)
- Place of birth: Saint-Martin-d'Hères, France
- Height: 1.92 m (6 ft 4 in)
- Position: Goalkeeper

Team information
- Current team: Pau
- Number: 1

Senior career*
| Years | Team | Apps | (Gls) |
| 2009–2012 | Grenoble | 34 | (0) |
| 2012–2014 | Tours | 8 | (0) |
| 2014–2024 | Grenoble | 296 | (0) |
| 2024–2026 | Saint-Étienne | 4 | (0) |
| 2025–2026 | Saint-Étienne B | 4 | (0) |
| 2026– | Pau | 0 | (0) |
- * Club domestic league appearances and goals as of 11 May 2026

Brice Maubleu (born 1 December 1989) is a French professional footballer who plays as a goalkeeper for Ligue 2 club Pau.

== Career ==
=== Grenoble ===
After progressing through the youth system at Grenoble, Maubleu was given the squad number 16 ahead of the 2009–10 season. He made his debut for the club on 27 March 2010 in the 2–0 defeat away to Lyon as both the first- and second-choice goalkeepers, Jody Viviani and Ronan Le Crom, were unavailable. Maubleu kept his place in the side for the following match but could not prevent the team falling to defeat a second time as they were beaten 2–1 at home by Lorient despite taking an early lead. It was several months until he appeared for the first team again, when he was selected for the two matches against Laval and Metz in October 2012; in the latter game he kept the first clean sheet of his senior career as Grenoble recorded a 1–0 victory thanks to a goal from Yohann Lasimant.

Maubleu subsequently returned to the substitutes' bench as Viviani regained his starting berth and remained there until the final game of the 2010–11 campaign when he kept goal in the 5–0 loss to Le Havre. Grenoble were demoted to the Championnat de France amateur 2, the fifth tier of French football, in the summer of 2011 after filing for bankruptcy. Maubleu went on to establish himself as the team's first choice stopper in the lower division, starting 26 league matches, although he occasionally shared goalkeeping duties with youngsters Nathan Monti and Gary Perrin.

=== Tours ===
On 13 July 2012, it was announced that he had agreed a three-year deal with Ligue 2 side Tours, where he would serve as back-up to Benjamin Leroy. Maubleu made his debut for the club on 18 November 2012 in the 2–1 defeat to Fleury in the seventh round of the Coupe de France.

=== Saint-Étienne ===
On 21 August 2024, following ten years with Grenoble, Maubleu signed for Ligue 1 club Saint-Étienne on a two-year contract with the option for a further twelve months.

== Career statistics ==
As of match played 22 December 2024

Appearances and goals by club, season, and competition
| Club | Season | League | | | National cup | | League cup | | Other | | Total | |
| Club | Season | Division | Apps | Goals | Apps | Goals | Apps | Goals | Apps | Goals | Apps | Goals |
|---|---|---|---|---|---|---|---|---|---|---|---|---|
| Grenoble | 2009–10 | Ligue 1 | 2 | 0 | 0 | 0 | 0 | 0 | — | | 2 | 0 |
| Grenoble | 2010–11 | Ligue 2 | 3 | 0 | 0 | 0 | 0 | 0 | — | | 3 | 0 |
| Grenoble | 2011–12 | CFA 2 | 29 | 0 | 0 | 0 | — | | — | | 29 | 0 |
| Grenoble | Total | | 34 | 0 | 0 | 0 | 0 | 0 | — | | 34 | 0 |
| Tours | 2012–13 | Ligue 2 | 0 | 0 | 1 | 0 | 0 | 0 | — | | 1 | 0 |
| Tours | 2013–14 | Ligue 2 | 8 | 0 | 1 | 0 | 1 | 0 | — | | 10 | 0 |
| Tours | Total | | 8 | 0 | 2 | 0 | 1 | 0 | — | | 11 | 0 |
| Grenoble | 2014–15 | CFA | 27 | 0 | 0 | 0 | — | | — | | 27 | 0 |
| Grenoble | 2015–16 | CFA | 30 | 0 | 1 | 0 | — | | — | | 8 | 0 |
| Grenoble | 2016–17 | CFA | 28 | 0 | 2 | 0 | — | | — | | 29 | 0 |
| Grenoble | 2017–18 | National | 29 | 0 | 2 | 0 | — | | 2 | 0 | 33 | 0 |
| Grenoble | 2018–19 | Ligue 2 | 23 | 0 | 0 | 0 | 0 | 0 | — | | 23 | 0 |
| Grenoble | 2019–20 | Ligue 2 | 27 | 0 | 1 | 0 | 0 | 0 | — | | 28 | 0 |
| Grenoble | 2020–21 | Ligue 2 | 25 | 0 | 0 | 0 | — | | 2 | 0 | 27 | 0 |
| Grenoble | 2021–22 | Ligue 2 | 34 | 0 | 0 | 0 | — | | — | | 34 | 0 |
| Grenoble | 2022–23 | Ligue 2 | 38 | 0 | 1 | 0 | — | | — | | 39 | 0 |
| Grenoble | 2023–24 | Ligue 2 | 34 | 0 | 1 | 0 | — | | — | | 35 | 0 |
| Grenoble | 2024–25 | Ligue 2 | 1 | 0 | — | | — | | — | | 1 | 0 |
| Grenoble | Total | | 296 | 0 | 8 | 0 | 0 | 0 | 2 | 0 | 306 | 0 |
| Saint-Étienne | 2024–25 | Ligue 1 | 0 | 0 | 1 | 0 | — | | — | | 1 | 0 |
| Career total | | | 338 | 0 | 9 | 0 | 1 | 0 | 4 | 0 | 352 | 0 |
