= Mihajlo Cvetković =

Serbian footballer

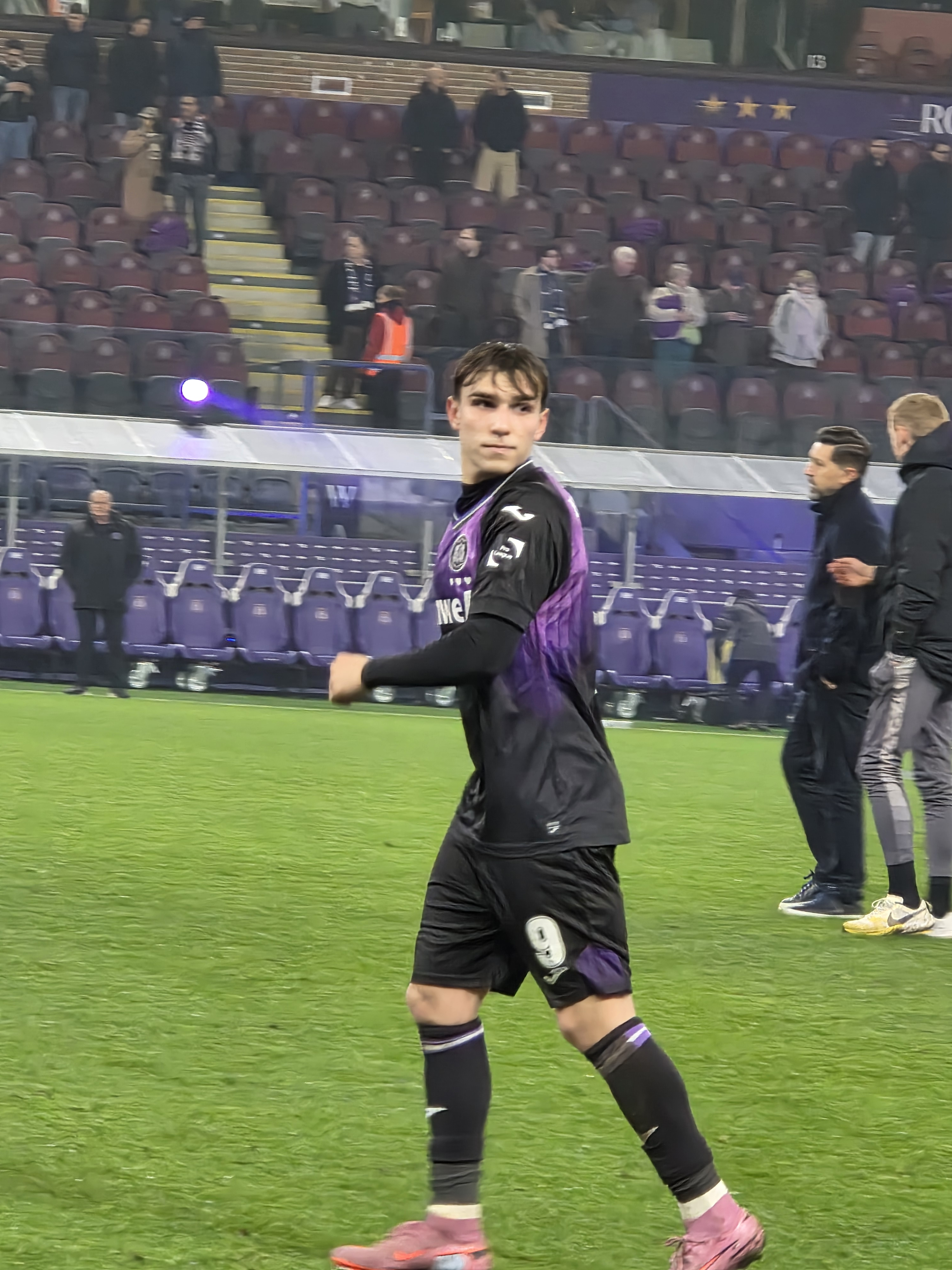

Personal information
- Full name: Mihajlo Cvetković
- Date of birth: 10 January 2007 (age 19)
- Place of birth: Niš, Serbia
- Height: 1.78 m (5 ft 10 in)
- Position: Forward

Team information
- Current team: Anderlecht
- Number: 9

Youth career
- 2012–2020: Šampion Nais
- 2020–2023: Čukarički

Senior career*
Years	Team	Apps	(Gls)
2023–2025	Čukarički	53	(12)
2025–	Anderlecht	39	(11)
2025	→ RSCA Futures (loan)	4	(3)

International career^{‡}
2022–2024	Serbia U17	16	(9)
2024–2026	Serbia U19	8	(5)
2025–	Serbia	7	(1)
- * Club domestic league appearances and goals as of 16 November 2026 ‡ National team caps and goals as of 16 November 2026

Mihajlo Cvetković (Serbian Cyrillic: Михајло Цветковић; born 10 January 2007) is a Serbian professional footballer who plays as a forward for Belgian club Anderlecht and the Serbia national team.

== Club career ==
=== Čukarički ===
After starting out at Šampion Nais, Cvetković joined the youth system of Čukarički in early 2020. He signed his first professional contract with the club in January 2022. In February 2023, Cvetković extended his contract with Čukarički until 2026.

On 4 September 2023, Cvetković made his senior debut for Čukarički, coming on as a second-half substitute for Luka Adžić and scoring a late equalizer to salvage a 2–2 draw away against Železničar Pančevo. He appeared in 30 games across all competitions throughout his first season with Čukarički, netting four goals.

On 4 November 2024, in a 2–0 home league win over Železničar Pančevo, Cvetković opened the scoring nine seconds into the match, setting the record for the fastest goal scored in Serbian SuperLiga history.

=== Anderlecht ===
On 23 April 2025, Cvetković signed a four-year contract with Belgian club Anderlecht, effective from the 2025–26 season. On 5 October, Cvetković scored his first Anderlecht goal in a 1–0 victory at home against fierce rivals Standard Liège.

== International career ==
In May 2023, Cvetković was selected to represent Serbia at the 2023 UEFA European Under-17 Championship. He scored two goals in the tournament, helping the team reach the quarter-finals. Subsequently, Cvetković led the team to the semi-finals of the 2024 UEFA European Under-17 Championship, scoring four goals in the tournament.

On 20 March 2025, Cvetković made his full international debut for Serbia, coming on as a late second-half substitute for Lazar Samardžić in a 1–1 away draw against Austria during the first leg of the UEFA Nations League promotion/relegation play-offs.

== Career statistics ==
=== Club ===
As of 10 November 2026

Appearances and goals by club, season and competition
Club	Season	League			National cup (Note: Includes Serbian Cup, Belgian Cup)		Continental		Total	
Club	Season	Division	Apps	Goals	Apps	Goals	Apps	Goals	Apps	Goals
Čukarički	2023–24	Serbian SuperLiga	22	3	2	1	6 (Note: Appearances in UEFA Conference League)	0	30	4
Čukarički	2024–25	Serbian SuperLiga	31	9	1	0	—		32	9
Čukarički	Total		53	12	3	1	6	0	62	13
Anderlecht	2025–26	Belgian Pro League	29	9	6	1	0	0	35	10
Anderlecht	2026–27	Belgian Pro League	10	2	1	0	10 (Note: Appearances in UEFA Europa League)	5	21	7
Anderlecht	Total		39	11	7	1	10	5	56	17
RSCA Futures	2025–26	Challenger Pro League	4	3	—		—		4	3
Career total			96	26	10	2	16	5	122	33

=== International ===
As of 16 November 2026

Appearances and goals by national team and year
National team	Year	Apps	Goals
Serbia	2025	2	0
Serbia	2026	5	1
Total		7	1

Scores and results list Serbia's goal tally first, score column indicates score after each Cvetković goal.

List of international goals scored by Mihajlo Cvetković
No.	Date	Venue	Opponent	Score	Result	Competition
1	4 October 2026	Philips Stadion, Eindhoven, Netherlands	Netherlands	1–1	1–2	2026–27 UEFA Nations League A
