= Nesta Elphege =

French footballer (born 2001)

Personal information
- Date of birth: 9 January 2001 (age 25)
- Place of birth: Saint-Denis, France
- Height: 1.96 m (6 ft 5 in)
- Position: Forward

Team information
- Current team: Parma
- Number: 23

Youth career
- –2009: CA Romainville
- 2009–2010: FC Romainville
- 2010–2019: Torcy

Senior career*
| Years | Team | Apps | (Gls) |
| 2021 | Tours | | |
| 2022 | Sète | 5 | (0) |
| 2022–2024 | Chamois Niortais | 35 | (14) |
| 2022–2023 | Chamois Niortais B | 10 | (9) |
| 2024–2025 | Grenoble | 26 | (4) |
| 2026– | Parma | 9 | (2) |
- * Club domestic league appearances and goals as of 25 May 2026

Nesta Elphege (born 9 January 2001) is a French professional footballer who plays as a forward for Serie A club Parma.

== Early life ==
Elphege was born on 9 January 2001. Born in Saint-Denis, France, he is a native of the city. He is of Cameroonian descent.

== Career ==
Elphege started his career with French side Tours. During the summer of 2022, he signed for fellow French side Sète, where he made five league appearances and scored zero goals.

The same year, he signed for French side Chamois Niortais, where he made thirty-five league appearances and scored fourteen goals. Ahead of the 2024–25 season, he signed for French side Grenoble, where he made twenty-six league appearances and scored four goals. Following his stint there, he signed for Italian side Parma in 2026.

== Style of play ==
Elphege plays as a forward. Italian news website ParmaToday wrote in 2026 that he is "a powerful striker capable of playing with his back to goal and shielding the ball".
