= Marwann Nzuzi =

French footballer (born 2004)

Personal information
- Date of birth: 16 May 2004 (age 22)
- Place of birth: France
- Height: 1.81 m (5 ft 11 in)
- Position: Right-back

Team information
- Current team: Bravo
- Number: 68

Youth career
- AJSC Nanterre
- Paris Saint-Germain
- CSM Puteaux
- –2016: Torcy
- 2016–2023: Saint-Étienne

Senior career*
Years	Team	Apps	(Gls)
2022–2025	Saint-Étienne B	27	(0)
2024	Saint-Étienne	2	(0)
2025–	Bravo	20	(0)
- * Club domestic league appearances and goals as of 19:35, 9 August 2025 (UTC)

Marwann Nzuzi (born 16 May 2004) is a French professional footballer who plays as a right-back for Slovenian PrvaLiga club Bravo.

== Career ==
Nzuzi came through AJSC Nanterre, Paris Saint-Germain, CSM Puteaux, and Torcy before joining the Saint-Étienne academy in 2016. On 14 May 2024, it was announced that he had signed his first professional contract with Saint-Étienne, a deal until 2025. On 17 August 2024, he made his professional and Ligue 1 debut in a 1–0 defeat away to Monaco. He followed up with another start in Saint-Étienne's next match against Le Havre, an eventual 2–0 defeat at home. Nzuzi received yellow cards in both matches.

On 28 July 2025, Nzuzi signed for Slovenian PrvaLiga club Bravo.

== Personal life ==
Born in France, Nzuzi is of Algerian and DR Congolese descent. He has French and Algerian citizenship.
