= Adedire Mebude =

Scottish-English footballer (born 2004)

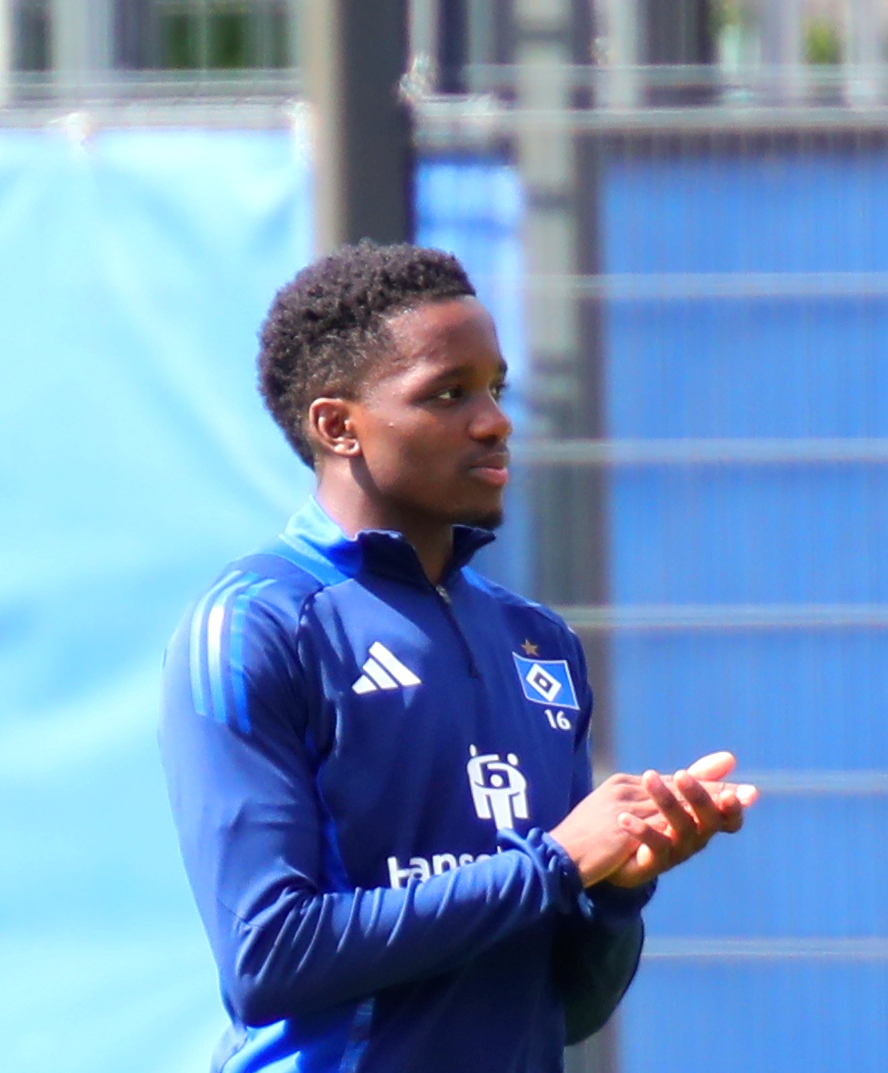

Personal information
- Full name: Adedire Emmanuel Awokoya-Mebude
- Date of birth: 28 May 2004 (age 22)
- Place of birth: London, England
- Height: 6 ft 2 in (1.89 m)
- Position: Winger

Team information
- Current team: Çaykur Rizespor
- Number: 17

Youth career
- 2014–2020: Rangers
- 2020–2023: Manchester City

Senior career*
Years	Team	Apps	(Gls)
2023–2026	Westerlo	33	(4)
2024	→ Bristol City (loan)	3	(0)
2025	→ Hamburger SV (loan)	4	(0)
2026–	Çaykur Rizespor	13	(2)

International career^{‡}
2019–2020	Scotland U16	4	(1)
2022	Scotland U19	8	(1)
2023–	Scotland U21	18	(4)
- * Club domestic league appearances and goals as of 10 June 2026 ‡ National team caps and goals as of 19 November 2025

Adedire Emmanuel Awokoya-Mebude (born 28 May 2004) is a professional footballer who plays as a winger for Süper Lig club Çaykur Rizespor. Born in England, he grew up in Scotland and he has played for the Scotland national under-21 team.

== Club career ==
Mebude joined the Scottish side Rangers at the age of ten, progressing through the academy before rejecting the offer of a contract at the age of sixteen. In September 2020, he joined the academy of Premier League side Manchester City. He signed his first professional contract with Manchester City in July 2021.

In August 2022, renewed contract talks between Mebude and Manchester City reportedly stalled, with fellow Premier League side Tottenham Hotspur linked with a move for the player, as well as PSV Eindhoven and Club Brugge.

On 26 July 2023, Mebude made a transfer from Manchester City to KVC Westerlo for a reported fee of up to £1.65m. He made his competitive debut on 6 August 2023, coming off the bench in a 1–0 against Club Brugge.

On 1 February 2024, Mebude signed for EFL Championship club Bristol City on loan until the end of the season. He made his first appearance as a substitute in Bristol City's 3–1 win at home to Southampton.

On 28 January 2025, Mebude moved on loan to Hamburger SV in Germany.

== International career ==
Mebude has represented Scotland at youth international levels up to the U21s. He is also eligible to represent England and Nigeria.

== Style of play ==
Described by Manchester City as a "skilful forward with blistering pace", Mebude is renowned for his goalscoring ability, and was named academy player's player of the year for the 2021–22 season.

== Personal life ==
Mebude is the brother of fellow professional footballer Dapo Mebude.

== Career statistics ==
As of 26 December 2024

Appearances and goals by club, season and competition
Club	Season	League			National cup		League cup		Other		Total	
Club	Season	Division	Apps	Goals	Apps	Goals	Apps	Goals	Apps	Goals	Apps	Goals
Manchester City U21	2021–22	—			—		—		1 (Note: Appearances in the EFL Trophy)	0	1	0
Manchester City U21	2022–23	—			—		—		2	0	2	0
Westerlo	2023–24	Belgian Pro League	3	0	0	0	—		0	0	3	0
Westerlo	2024–25	Belgian Pro League	16	2	2	0	—		0	0	18	2
Westerlo	Total		19	2	2	0	0	0	0	0	21	2
Bristol City (loan)	2023–24	EFL Championship	3	0	0	0	0	0	—		3	0
Career total			22	2	2	0	0	0	3	0	27	2
