= Lucas Stassin =

Belgian footballer (born 2004)

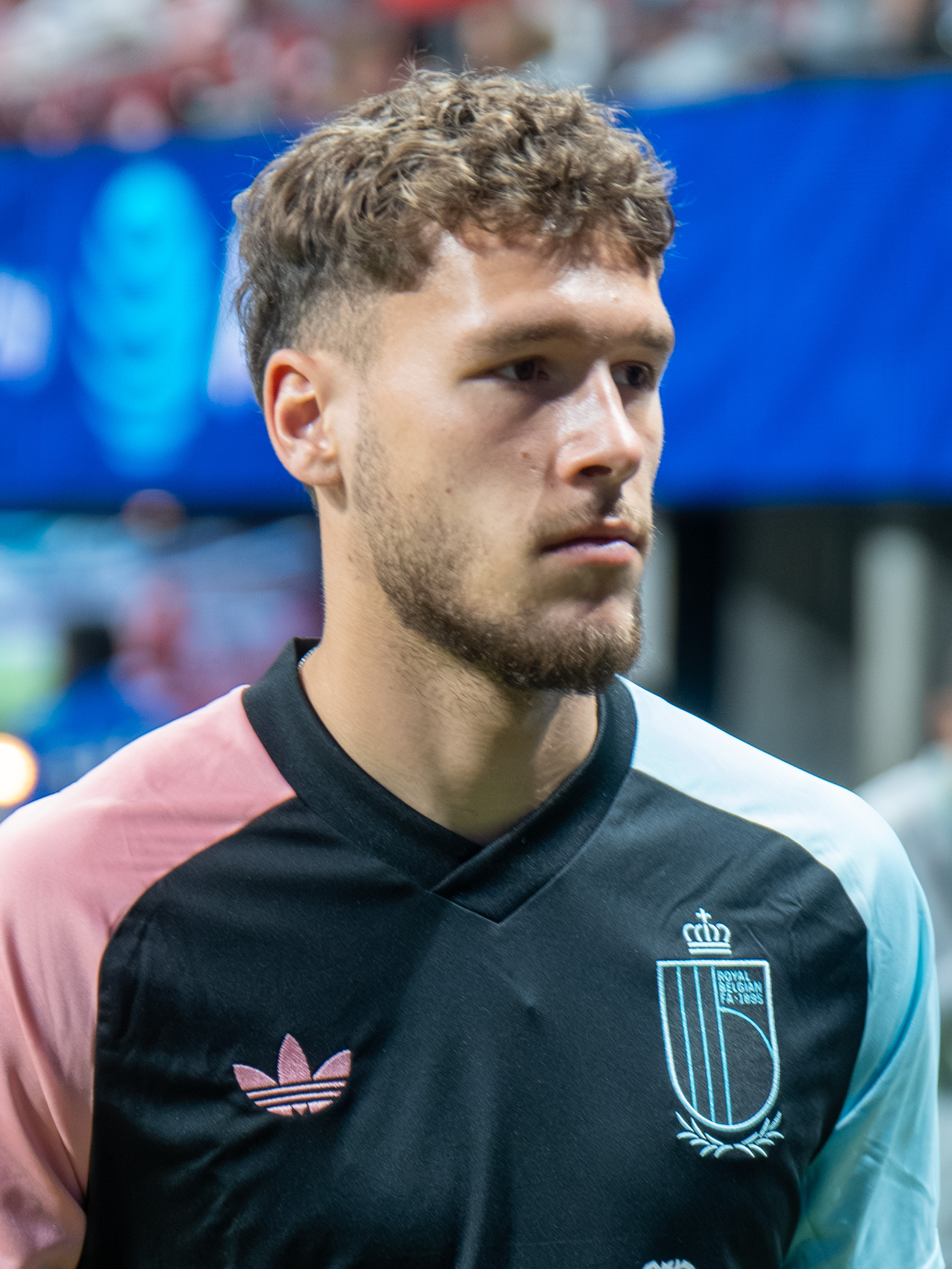
- Stassin with Belgium in 2026

Personal information
- Full name: Lucas Frédéric Stassin
- Date of birth: 29 November 2004 (age 21)
- Place of birth: Braine-le-Comte, Belgium
- Height: 1.84 m (6 ft 0 in)
- Position: Striker

Team information
- Current team: Sevilla (on loan from Saint-Étienne)
- Number: 19

Youth career
- –2014: Stade Brainois
- 2014-2022: Anderlecht

Senior career*
| Years | Team | Apps | (Gls) |
| 2022–2023 | RSCA Futures | 29 | (15) |
| 2022–2023 | Anderlecht | 3 | (0) |
| 2023–2024 | Westerlo | 31 | (11) |
| 2024– | Saint-Étienne | 61 | (23) |
| 2026– | → Sevilla (loan) | 8 | (1) |

International career^{‡}
| 2019 | Belgium U15 | 3 | (0) |
| 2020 | Belgium U16 | 1 | (1) |
| 2021–2022 | Belgium U18 | 3 | (0) |
| 2023 | Belgium U19 | 2 | (0) |
| 2023– | Belgium U21 | 13 | (5) |
| 2026– | Belgium | 1 | (0) |
- * Club domestic league appearances and goals as of 21 November 2026 ‡ National team caps and goals as of 15:34, 18 November 2026 (UTC)

Lucas Frédéric Stassin (French pronunciation: [ly.ka sta.sɛ̃]; born 29 November 2004) is a Belgian professional footballer who plays as a striker for La Liga club Sevilla, on loan from Ligue 2 club Saint-Étienne, and the Belgium national team.

== Club career ==
=== Anderlecht ===
Stassin played at Stade Brainois initially as a youngster, before he joined the academy at Anderlecht in 2014 at nine years-old. After working through the age group sides he signed a three-year professional contract with Anderlecht in June 2021, tying him to the club until 2024.

From the start of the 2022–23 Challenger Pro League season Stassin scored 11 goals in 16 games for RSCA Futures. This form earned him a call up to the Anderlecht first team, and he made his Anderlecht senior debut in the UEFA Europa Conference League, where he appeared as a second-half substitute, against West Ham United. He then made his debut in the Belgian Pro League against Club Brugge in October 2022.

=== Westerlo ===
On 27 July 2023, Belgian Pro League side Westerlo announced the signing of Stassin on a four-year contract, for a reported fee of €1.5 million.

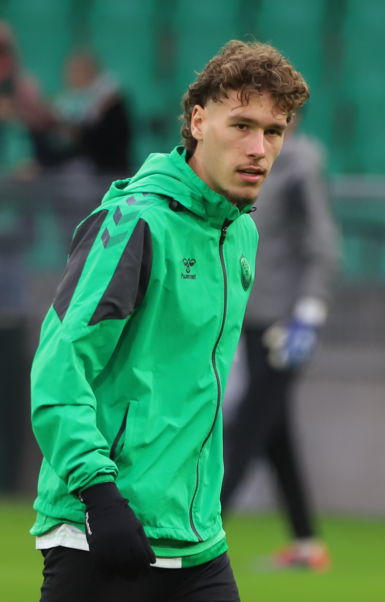
Stassin with Saint-Étienne in 2024.

=== Saint-Étienne ===
On 30 August 2024, Stassin joined Ligue 1 club Saint-Étienne for a fee of €9 million, signing a four-year contract with an option for a fifth year. He reached double-figures for goals in Ligue 1 in his debut season, including both goals in a man-of-the-match performance in a 2-1 league win in the Rhône-Alpes derby against Olympique Lyonnais on 20 April 2025.

==== Loan to Sevilla ====
On 1 September 2026, Stassin renewed his contract with Saint-Étienne until 2029, and was loaned to La Liga side Sevilla for one year. Stassin had a goal-scoring debut against Espanyol in a 1–1 league draw on 6 September.

== International career ==
Stassin earned three caps with the Belgium national under-18 football team. In March 2026, he was called up to the Belgium U19s for the first time. That month, he received his first call-up to the senior Belgium national football team. He made his debut on 1 April 2026 as a second-half substitute in a 1-1 draw against Mexico.

== Personal life ==
He is the son of former professional footballer Stéphane Stassin.

== Career statistics ==
=== Club ===
As of match played 21 November 2026

Appearances and goals by club, season and competition
| Club | Season | League | | | Cup (Note: Includes Belgian Cup, Coupe de France) | | Europe | | Other | | Total | |
| Club | Season | Division | Apps | Goals | Apps | Goals | Apps | Goals | Apps | Goals | Apps | Goals |
|---|---|---|---|---|---|---|---|---|---|---|---|---|
| RSCA Futures | 2022–23 | Challenger Pro League | 29 | 15 | — | | — | | — | | 29 | 15 |
| Anderlecht | 2022–23 | Belgian Pro League | 3 | 0 | 0 | 0 | 2 (Note: Appearances in UEFA Conference League) | 0 | — | | 5 | 0 |
| Westerlo | 2023–24 | Belgian Pro League | 26 | 9 | 1 | 0 | — | | — | | 27 | 9 |
| Westerlo | 2024–25 | Belgian Pro League | 5 | 2 | — | | — | | — | | 5 | 2 |
| Westerlo | Total | | 31 | 11 | 1 | 0 | — | | — | | 66 | 26 |
| Saint-Étienne | 2024–25 | Ligue 1 | 28 | 12 | 1 | 0 | — | | — | | 29 | 12 |
| Saint-Étienne | 2025–26 | Ligue 2 | 31 | 11 | 1 | 0 | — | | 3 (Note: Appearances in Ligue 1 relegation/promotion play-offs) | 0 | 35 | 11 |
| Saint-Étienne | 2026–27 | Ligue 2 | 2 | 0 | — | | — | | — | | 2 | 0 |
| Saint-Étienne | Total | | 61 | 23 | 2 | 0 | — | | 3 | 0 | 66 | 23 |
| Sevilla (loan) | 2026–27 | La Liga | 8 | 1 | 0 | 0 | — | | — | | 8 | 1 |
| Career total | | | 132 | 50 | 3 | 0 | 2 | 0 | 3 | 0 | 140 | 50 |
