= US Torcy =

French football club

Torcy
- Full name: Union Sportive Torcy-Paris Vallée de la Marne Football
- Founded: 1942; 84 years ago
- Ground: Stade du Frémoy; Torcy, Seine-et-Marne
- Capacity: 1,350
- Chairman: Pascal Antonetti
- League: Régional 1
- 2019–20: Championnat National 3, Group L: Île-de-France, 11th (relegated)
- Website: https://torcyfoot.footeo.com

Union Sportive Torcy-Paris Vallée de la Marne Football is a football club based in Torcy, Seine-et-Marne, France, founded in 1942.

== History ==
US Torcy is known for its youth development. As of January 2020, 52 players who have trained at the club have become professionals, among them Paul Pogba, Adrien Hunou, Mourad Meghni, Yohann Pelé, and Jeff Reine-Adélaïde.

The club reached the eighth round of the 2007–08 Coupe de France in 2006, playing against Ligue 2 side FC Metz.

As part of Paul Pogba's move from Juventus to Manchester United in 2016, the club received 0.25 percent of the then-world record fee of €105 million Manchester United paid to Juventus, amounting to about €300,000.

Ahead of the 2019–20 season, US Torcy was promoted to the fifth-tier of French football, the Championnat National 3.

In January 2020, it participated in the round of 16 of the Coupe Gambardella, the main youth national cup competition in France. As of the 2020–21 season, Torcy's under-19 side participates in the Championnat National U19, the highest tier of under-19 football in France.

== Notable players ==
- (France) Michel Ndary Adopo (youth)
- (France) Mathis Amougou (youth)
- (France) Maghnes Akliouche (youth)
- (France) Etienne Camara (youth)
- (France) Yoann Cathline (youth)
- (France) Alexis Claude-Maurice (youth)
- (France) Nesta Elphege (youth)
- (France) Lucas Gourna-Douath (youth)
- (France) Thérence Koudou (youth)
- (France) Lucas Michal (youth)
- (Algeria) Mourad Meghni (youth)
- (Algeria) Anis Hadj Moussa (youth)
- (Democratic Republic of the Congo) Lionel Mpasi (youth)
- (France) Randal Kolo Muani (youth)
- (France) Paul Pogba (youth)
- (France) Kenny Quetant (youth)
- (Mali) Ibrahima Sissoko (youth)
