= Čukarički Stadium =

Stadium in Belgrade, Serbia

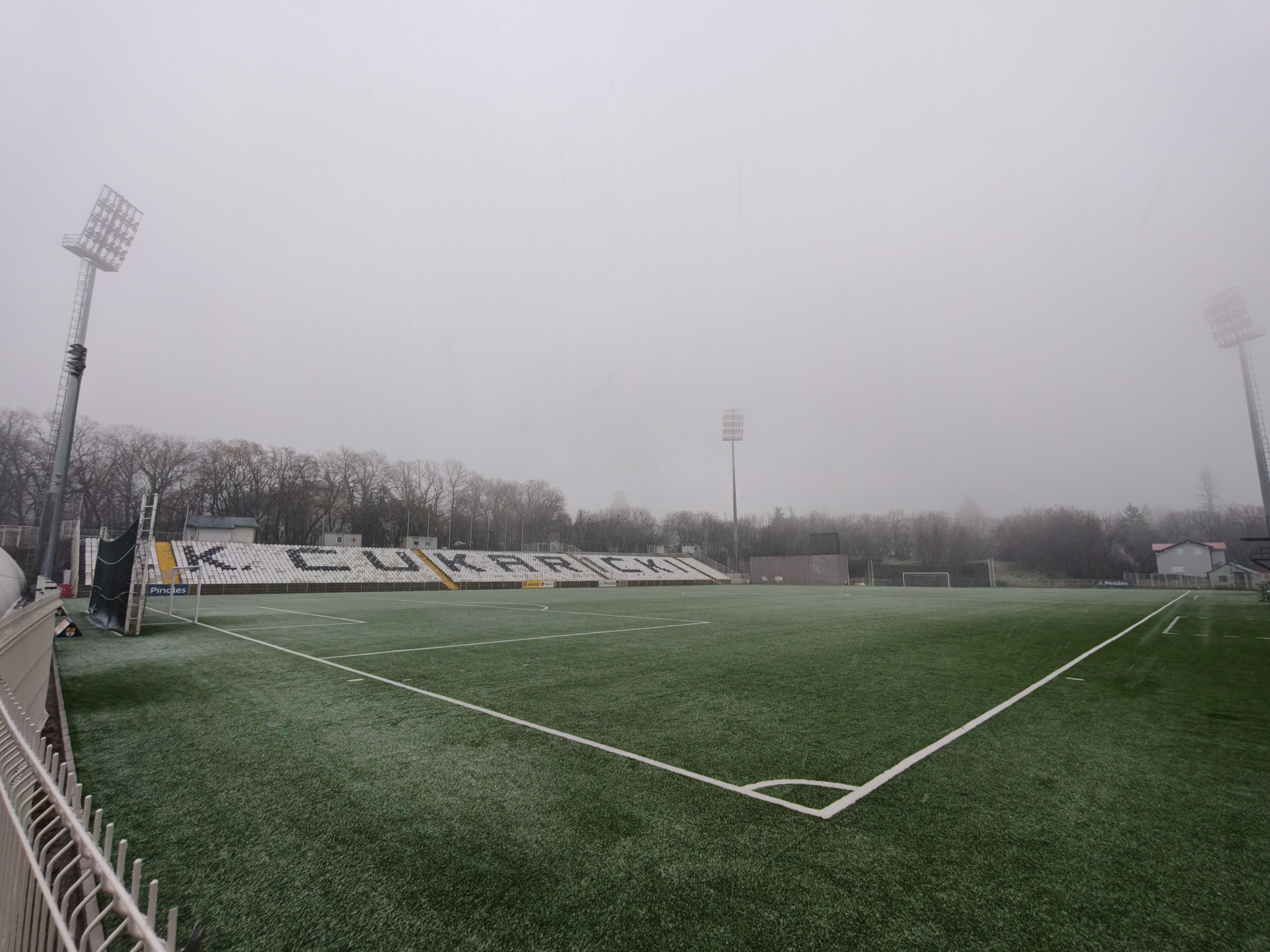
- View on Čukarički Stadium from northwest corner during winter
- Interactive map of Čukarički Stadium
- Full name: Čukarički Stadium
- Location: Čukarica, Belgrade, Serbia
- Coordinates: 44°46′21.57″N 20°25′17.90″E
- Owner: SD Čukarički
- Operator: FK Čukarički
- Capacity: 4,070
- Surface: Artificial turf

Construction
- Built: 1969
- Renovated: 2012–2013

Tenant
- FK Čukarički (1969–present)

Čukarički Stadium (Serbian: Stadion FK Čukarički / Стадион ФК Чукарички), colloquially known as the Stadion na Banovom brdu, is a multi-purpose stadium in Belgrade, Serbia. It is the home ground of FK Čukarički. The stadium has a seating capacity of 4,070.

== History ==
The stadium was opened on 1969. During the 2012–13 season, the stadium underwent reconstruction after which the planned seating capacity of the stadium was expected to be 8,000 seats.

== Gallery ==
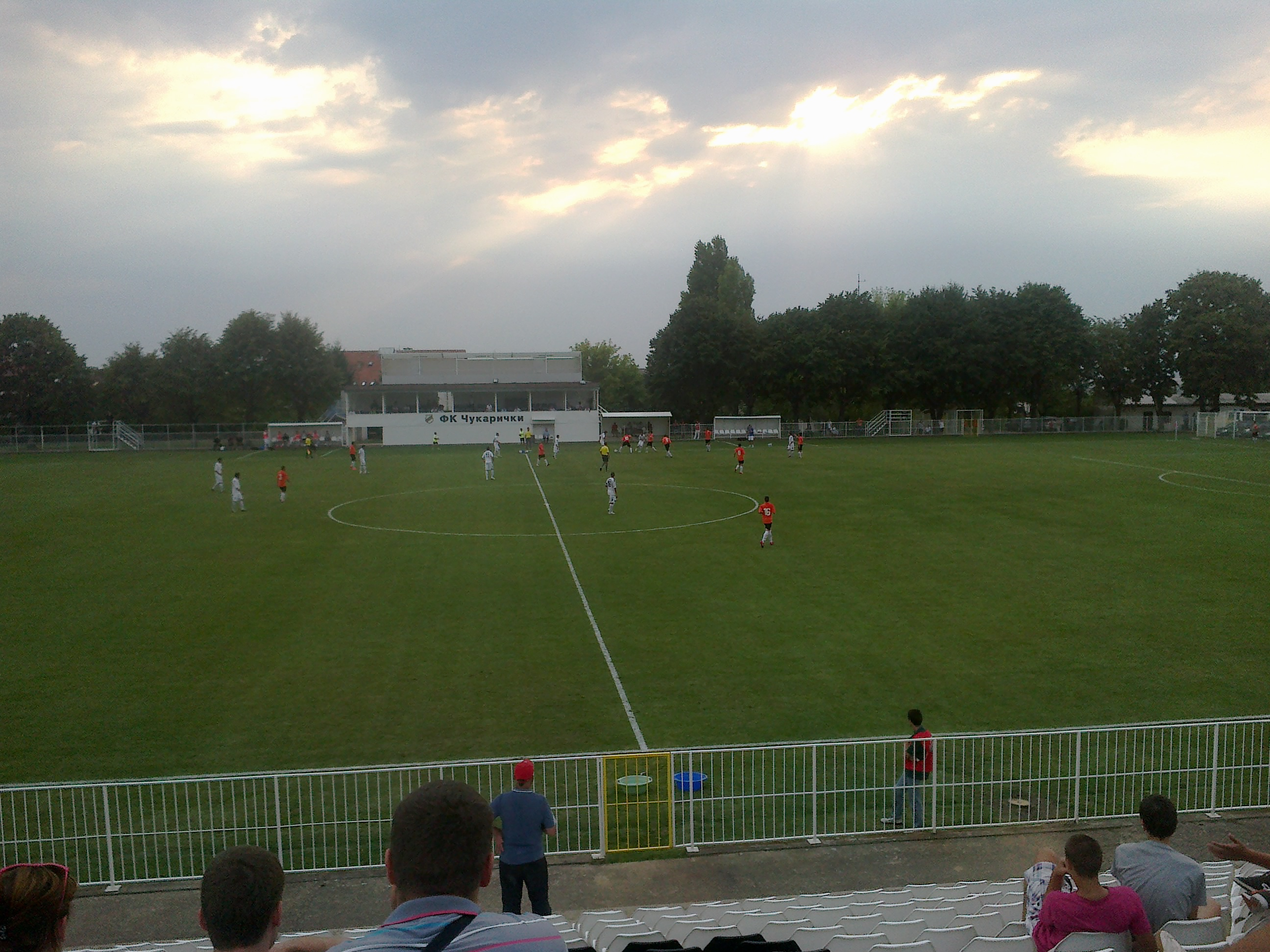
View on football pitch from east stand of Čukarički Stadium, September 2012

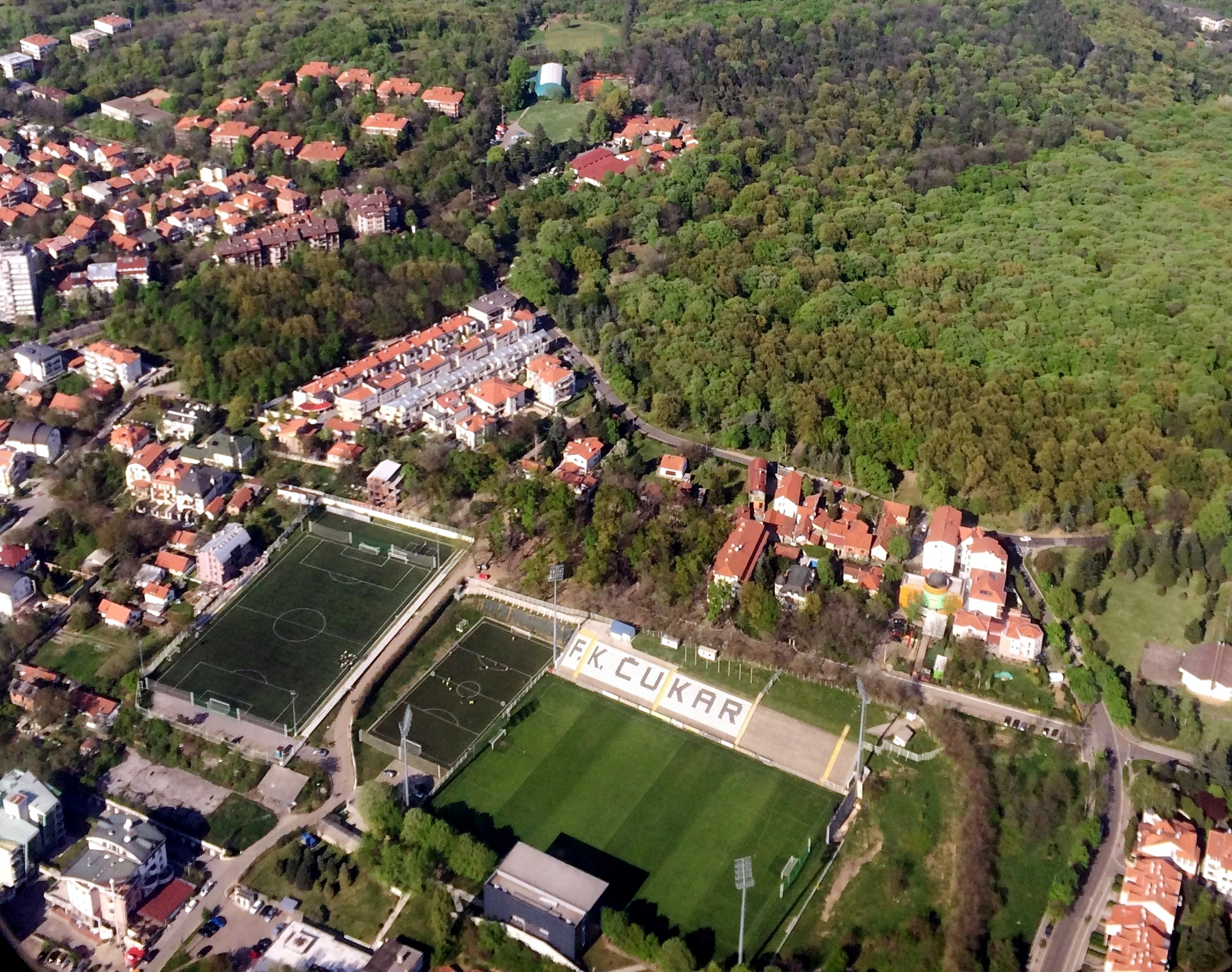
Aerial view of Čukarički Stadium, April 2015

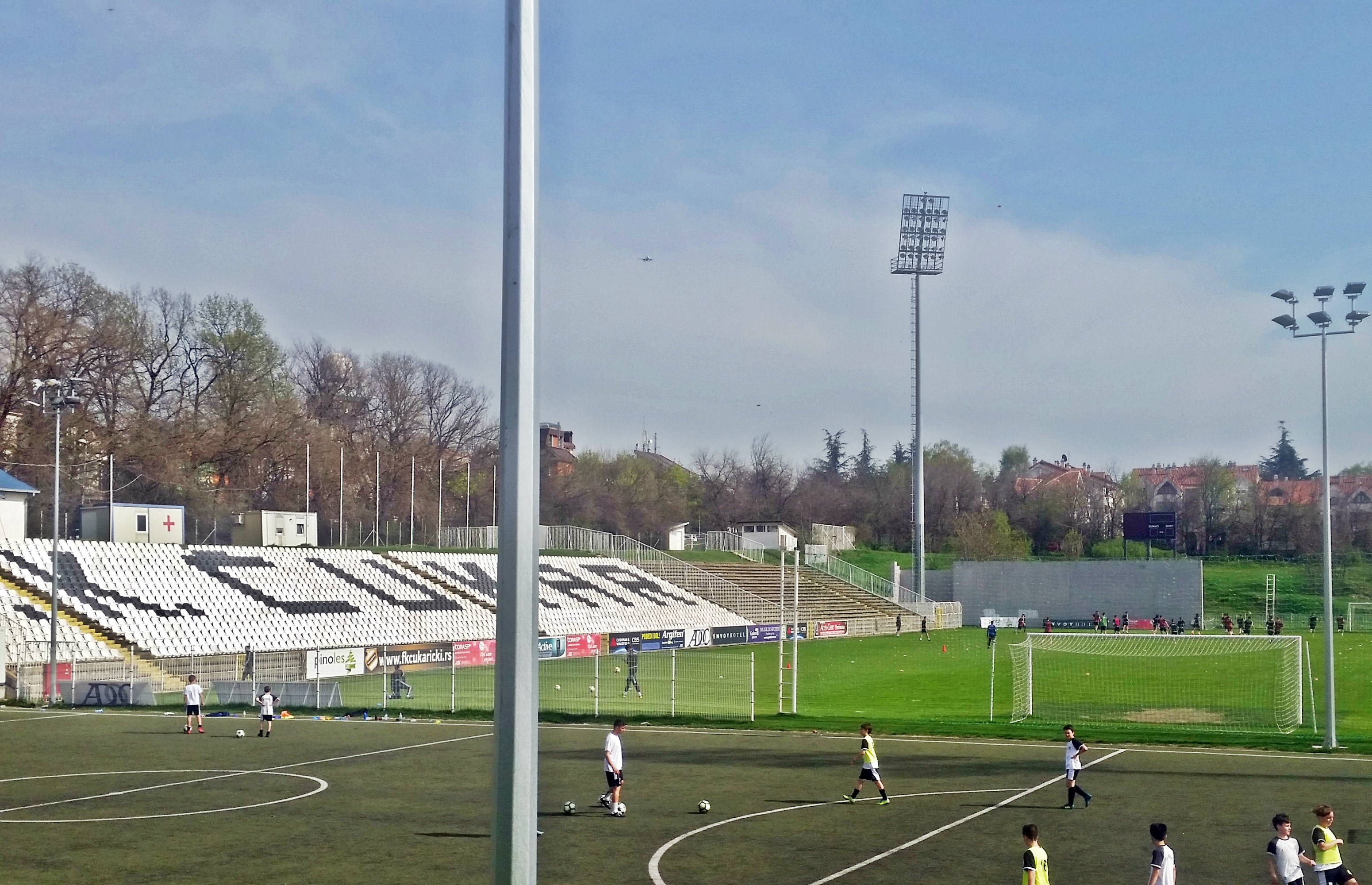
East stand of Čukarički Stadium, April 2018

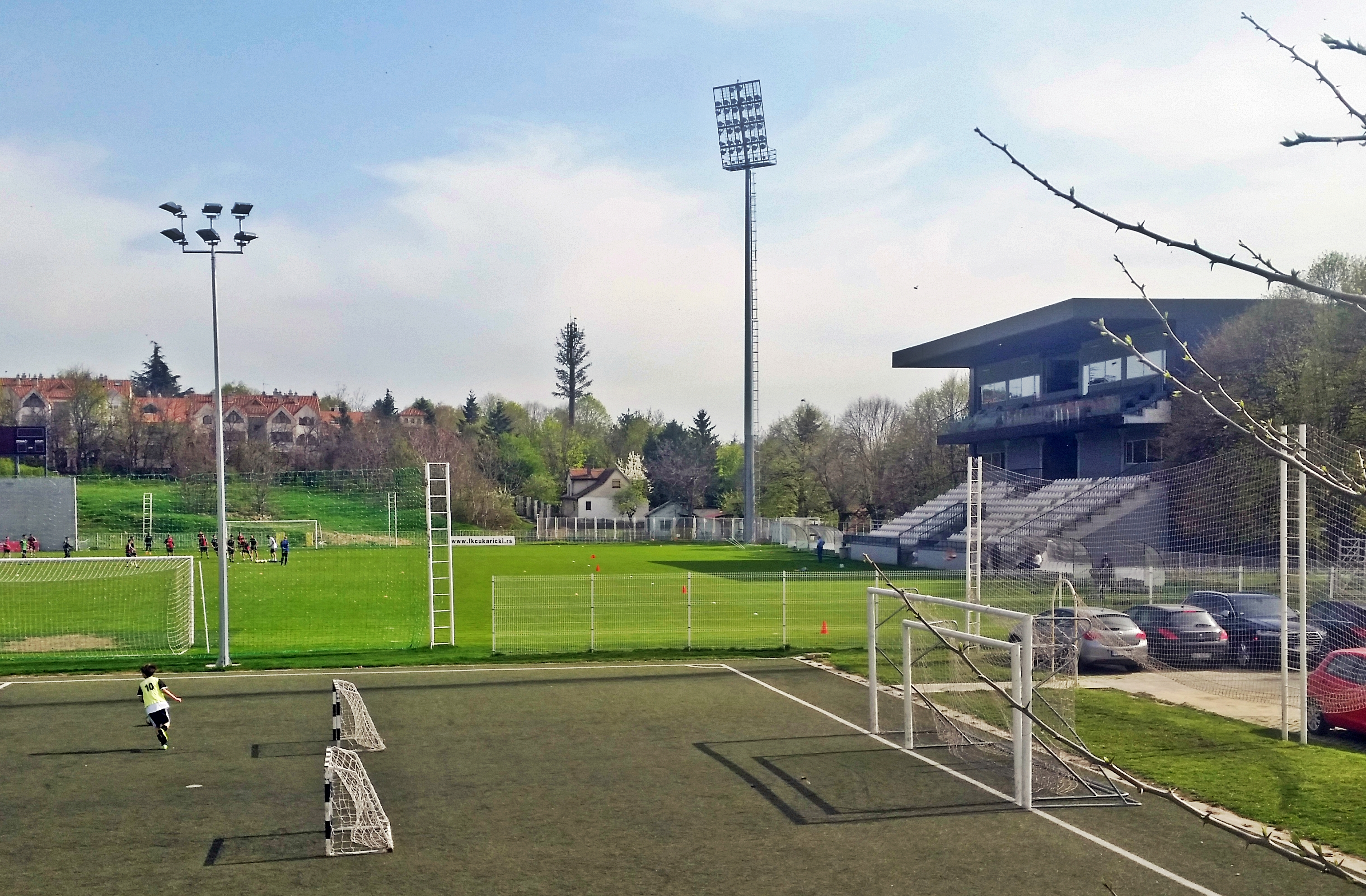
West stand of Čukarički Stadium during spring season

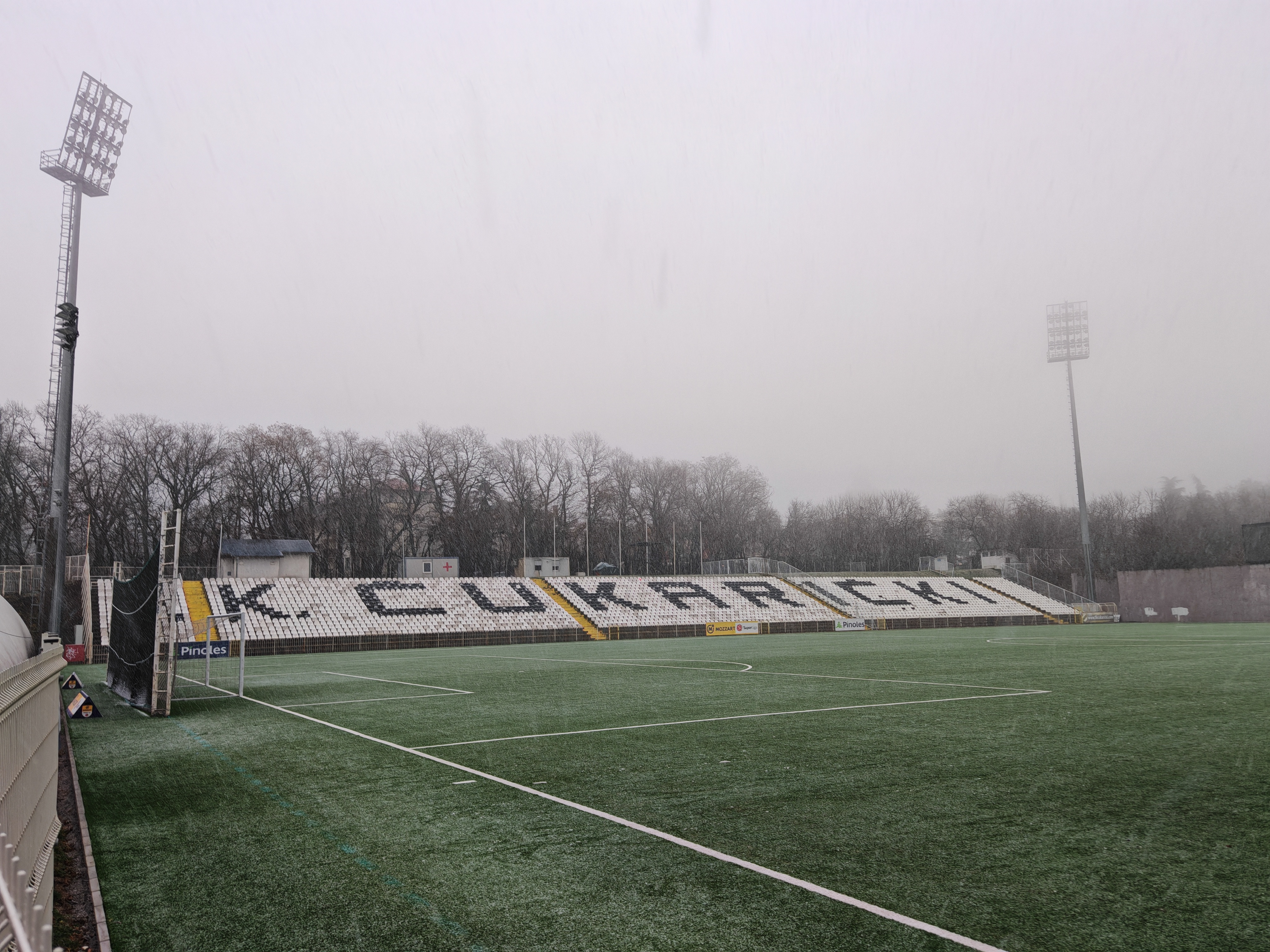
View on east stand of Čukarički Stadium during winter, February 2026

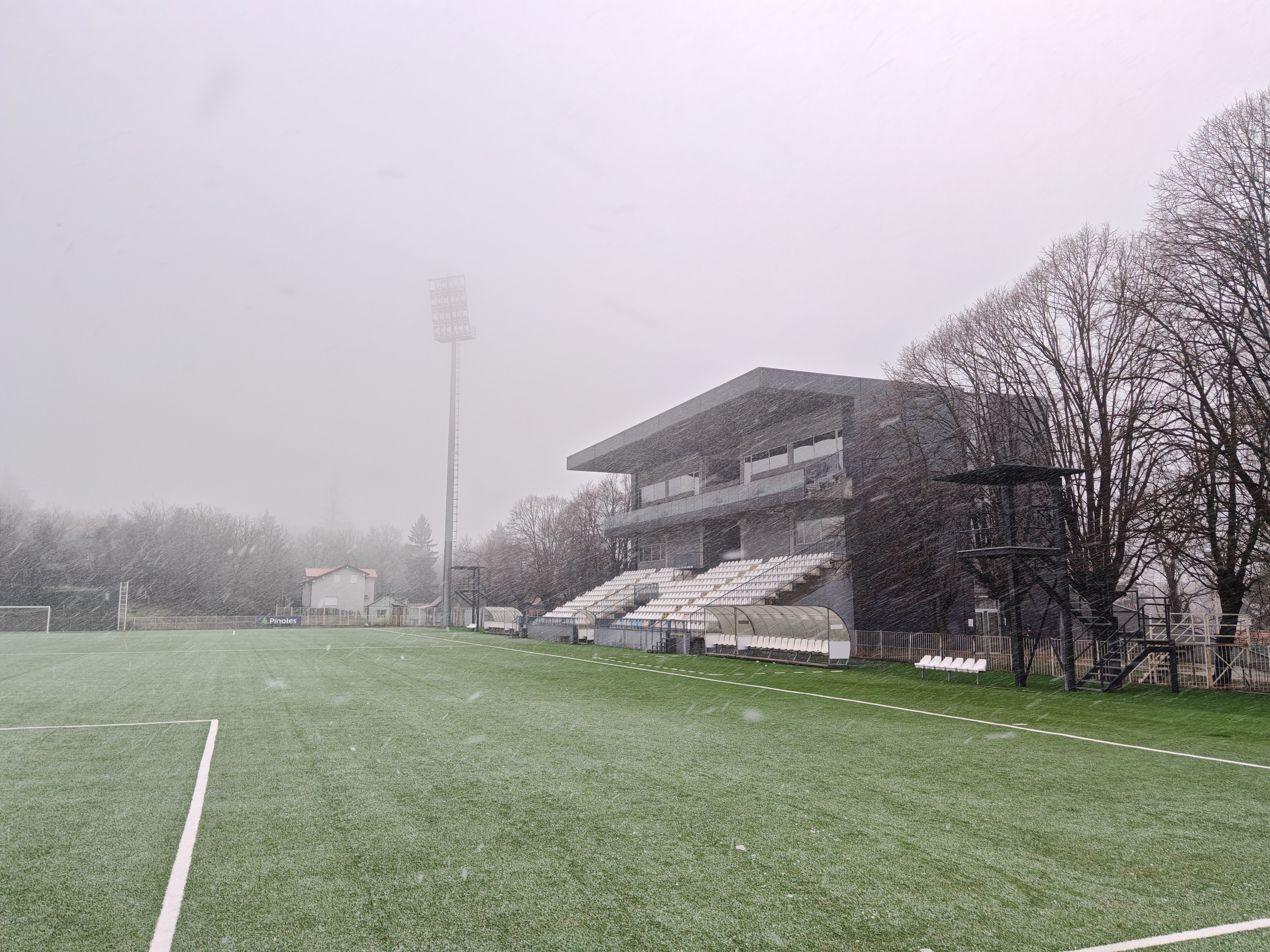
View on west stand of Čukarički Stadium during winter

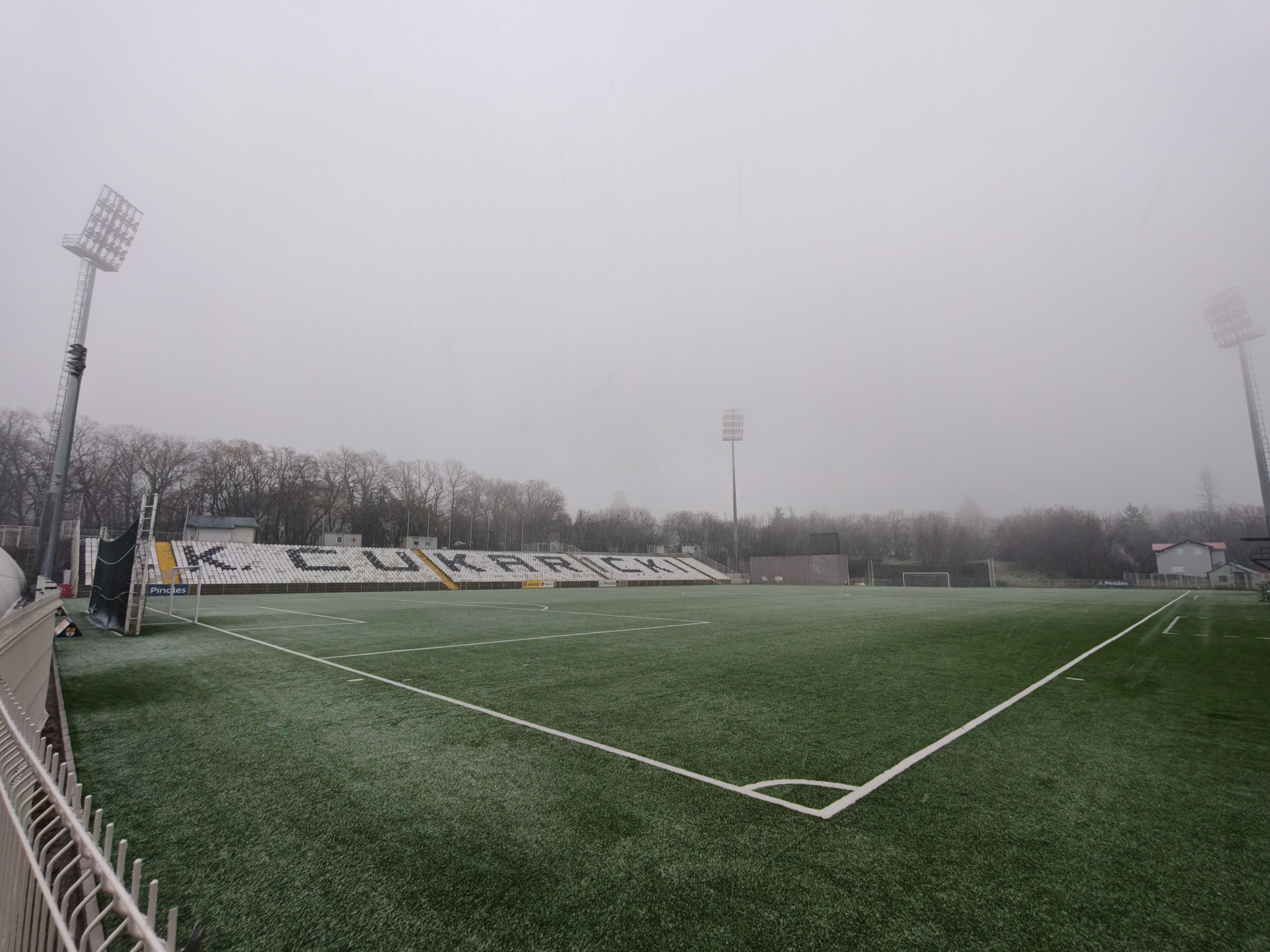
View on Čukarički Stadium from northwest corner during winter

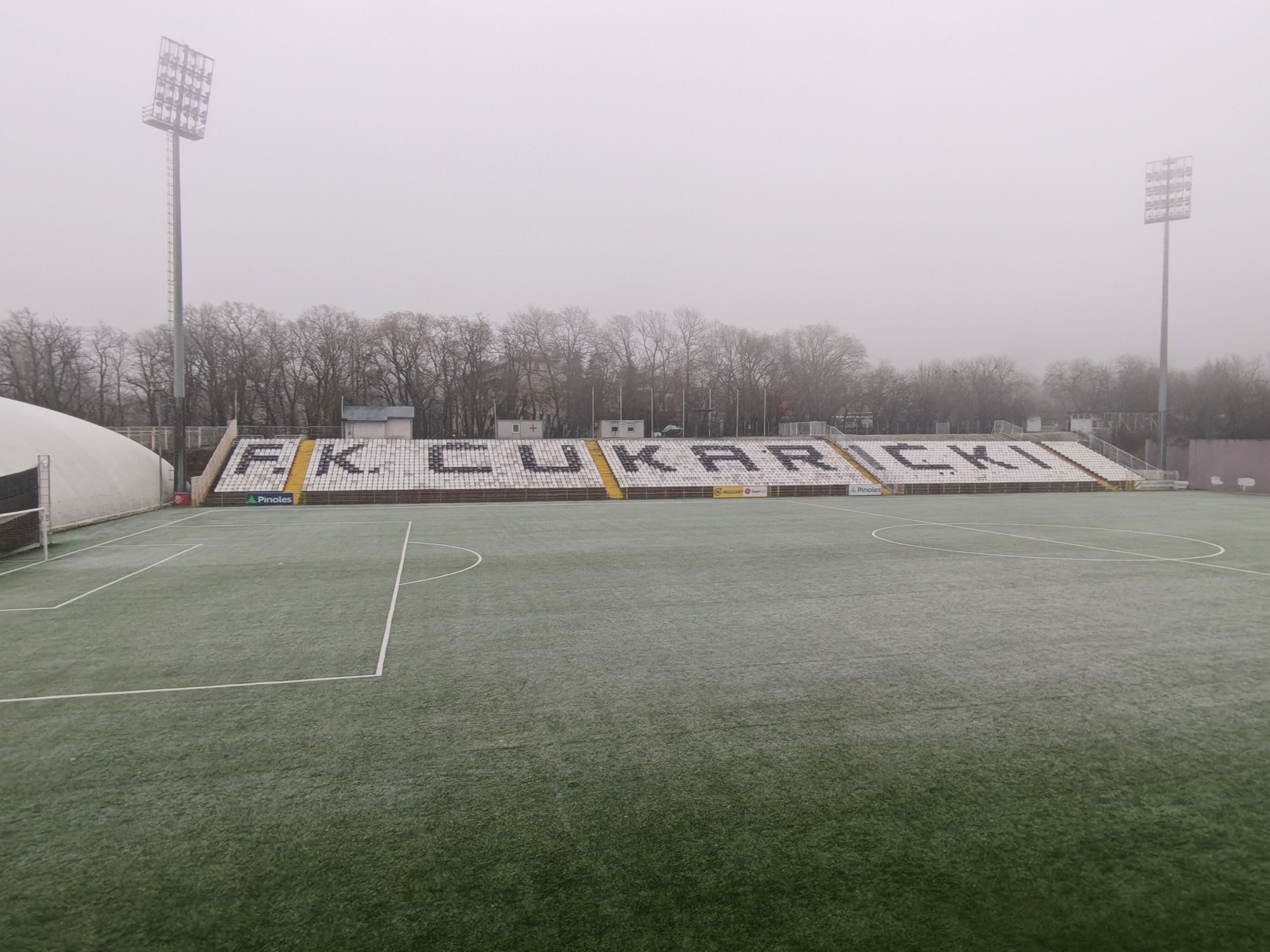
Alternate view on east stand of Čukarički Stadium during winter

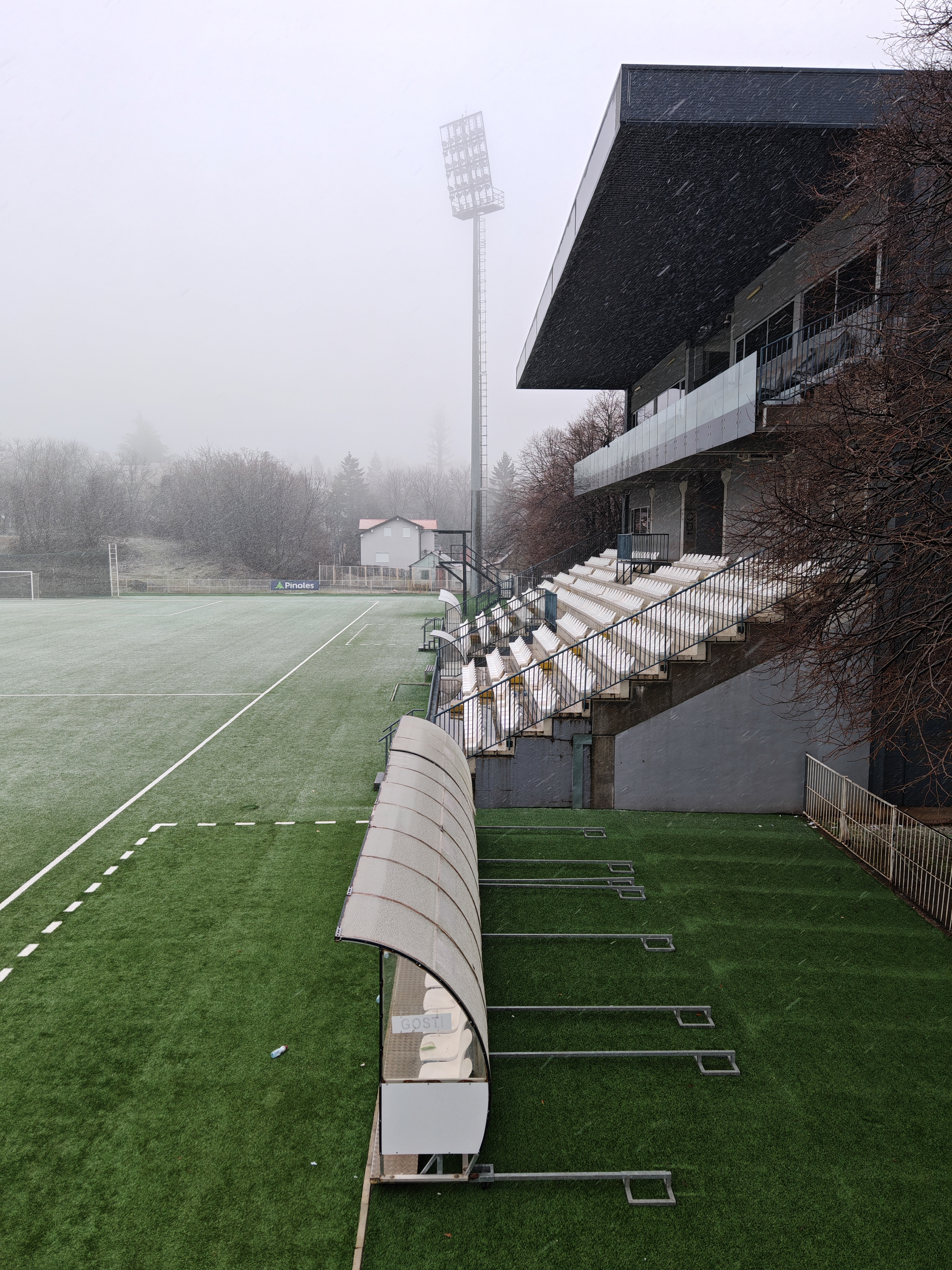
Close view of west stand of Čukarički Stadium during winter

== See also ==
- List of football stadiums in Serbia
