= Ravil Tagir =

Turkish footballer (born 2003)

Personal information
- Date of birth: 6 May 2003 (age 23)
- Place of birth: Taraz, Kazakhstan
- Height: 1.85 m (6 ft 1 in)
- Position: Defender

Team information
- Current team: Al Jazira
- Number: 28

Youth career
- 2016–2019: Altınordu

Senior career*
Years	Team	Apps	(Gls)
2019–2020	Altınordu	34	(1)
2020–2024	İstanbul Başakşehir	14	(0)
2022–2024	→ Westerlo (loan)	58	(3)
2024–	Al Jazira	30	(3)

International career^{‡}
2018	Turkey U15	4	(0)
2018–2019	Turkey U16	12	(3)
2019	Turkey U17	1	(0)
2019–2024	Turkey U21	22	(1)
- * Club domestic league appearances and goals as of 1 March 2026 ‡ National team caps and goals as of 11 October 2024

Ravil Tagir (born 6 May 2003) is a professional footballer who plays as a defender for UAE Pro League club Al Jazira. Born in Kazakhstan, he represents Turkey internationally.

== Early years ==
Tagir was born on 6 May 2003, in Taraz, Jambyl Region, Kazakhstan. His father, Gülali Tagir emigrated to Bursa in 2002, after his sister got married there. Tagir's grandparent were Meskhetian Turks who were exiled to Kazakhstan during the Soviet Union in 1944.

== Club career ==
Following a tryout event held in city of Bursa, Tagir, at the age of 12, was drafted by İzmir-based Altınordu F.K. in 2015, where he spent five years. On 29 June 2019, Altınordu announced that Tagir signed his first professional contract with them. He made his TFF First League debut against Hatayspor on 18 August 2019, in which Altınordu lost 1–0. On 14 February 2020, he scored his first goal at professional level against Osmanlıspor FK, ended 2–2.

İstanbul Başakşehir F.K. announced the transfer of Tagir, for an agreed €2.5m transfer fee, with an 30% future sales commission for Altınordu FK. on 28 September 2020. Parties agreed on a three-season-long contract.

Tagir made his Süper Lig debut against Denizlispor on week 10 encounter of Lig 2020–21 season, ended 3–3, at Başakşehir Fatih Terim Stadium, on 28 November 2020. He scored his first goal at Başakşehir against Tuzlaspor, scoring fourth goal of team with a header in the 79th minute of a Round 16 away encounter of 2020–21 Turkish Cup, ended 5–1 for Başakşehir on 13 January 2021. Tagir was included in match squad at 2020 Turkish Super Cup Final, however; he stayed as an unused player st bench against Trabzonspor, played on 27 January 2021 at a delayed fixture due to COVID-19 pandemic which Başakşehir lost 2–1.

On 23 June 2022, Tagir moved to Westerlo in Belgium on a two-season loan.

On 12 August 2024, Tagir moved to Al Jazira.

== International career ==
Due to his background, he is eligible to represent for Turkey, Georgia and Kazakhstan at senior level.

Tagir represented Turkey first at U-15 level, when he was invited by coach Nedim Yiğit, along with three other teammates from Altınordu, for two friendly games to be held against Romania U-15 national team, in March 2018. He earned his first cap at youth international levels in a friendly game against Romania on 6 March 2018, ended 3–0 for Turkey.

Tagir played his first U-16 game against Scotland on 22 August 2018, in which he scored the opening goal as game ended 2–0 for Turkey, at St. George Park Tournament.

Tagir was invited to Turkey U-21 team for first time by coach Vedat İnceefe, for the qualification stage game of 2021 UEFA European Under-21 Championship, against England U-21 on 30 August 2019. He earned his first U-21 cap, as a starter, at 2021 UEFA U-21 Championship qualification stage - Group 3 encounter, against England U-21, which Turkey lost 3–2.

Tagir was called up to the senior Turkey squad for the 2022–23 UEFA Nations League matches against Luxembourg on 22 September 2022 and Faroe Islands on 25 September 2022.

== Career statistics ==
=== Club ===
As of 3 April 2022

Appearances and goals by club, season and competition
Club	Season	League			Cup^{1}		Other^{2}		Continental^{3}		Total	
Club	Season	Division	Apps	Goals	Apps	Goals	Apps	Goals	Apps	Goals	Apps	Goals
Altınordu	2019–20	TFF First League	32	1	1	0	—		—		33	1
Altınordu	2020–21	TFF First League	2	0	0	0	—		—		2	0
Altınordu	Total		34	1	1	0	—		—		35	1
İstanbul Başakşehir	2020–21	Süper Lig	7	0	2	1	—		0	0	9	1
İstanbul Başakşehir	2021–22	Süper Lig	7	0	1	0	—		—		8	0
İstanbul Başakşehir	Total		14	0	3	1	—		—		17	1
Career total			48	1	4	1	—		—		52	2

- 1.Includes Turkish Cup.
- 2.Includes Turkish Super Cup.
- 3.Includes UEFA Champions League and UEFA Europa League.
