= Sunday Adetunji =

Nigerian footballer (born 1997)

Personal information
- Date of birth: 10 December 1997 (age 28)
- Place of birth: Lagos, Nigeria
- Height: 1.91 m (6 ft 3 in)
- Position: Centre-forward

Team information
- Current team: Al-Hilal SC
- Number: 31

Senior career*
Years	Team	Apps	(Gls)
2016	Shooting Stars	20	(10)
2017–2018	Abia Warriors	28	(14)
2019	Lobi Stars	2	(0)
2019–2020	Příbram	1	(0)
2019–2020	→ Příbram B	6	(2)
2020	Lobi Stars	2	(0)
2020	Plateau United	1	(0)
2021	Rivers United	16	(4)
2021–2023	Shkupi	54	(31)
2023–2024	Čukarički	11	(1)
2024	Celje	9	(1)
2024–2025	Ballkani	32	(18)
2025-	Al-Hilal SC		

International career^{‡}
2021	Nigeria	1	(0)
- * Club domestic league appearances and goals as of 31 August 2025 ‡ National team caps and goals as of 2 September 2023

Sunday Damilare Adetunji (born 10 December 1997) is a Nigerian professional footballer who plays as a centre-forward for Sudanese club Al Hilal SC.

== Club career ==
On 1 January 2017, Adetunji signed with home side club Abia Warriors. After spells with Enyimba and Lobi Stars, he transferred to Czech club Příbram in 2019, first playing for their reserves, appearing six times and scoring twice, before going on to play for the first team with just one appearance.

In 2020, Adetunji returned to Nigeria, signing with former club Lobi Stars on free transfer. He went on to play for Plateau United and once again in Abia Warriors, before transferring to Rivers United in January 2021.

On 27 August 2021, Adetunji signed with Macedonian First League club KF Shkupi. On 28 August 2021, he made his debut and scored a brace in a 4–1 win against FK Skopje. Adetunji finished the season as the top scorer in the league with 20 goals, helping Shkupi to their first league title.

On September 1, 2023, he signed with Serbian club FK Čukarički. Adetunji arrived as a free agent in Čukarički near the end of the transfer window, as a replacement for Muhammed Badamosi. And immediately on his debut, he made a huge contribution to the triumph against the Serbian champions Red Star, he forced a penalty, and then scored a spectacular goal in the 75th minute for the victory.

== International career ==
On 4 July 2021, Adetunji made his first appearance for Nigeria coming on as a sub in the 58th minute of a 4–0 loss against Mexico in an international friendly game.

== Honours ==
Shkupi

- Macedonian First Football League: 2021–22

Individual:

- Macedonian First Football League: 2021–22 league top-scorer
- Serbian SuperLiga Player of the Week: 2023–24 (Round 7)
