= Igor Miladinović (footballer, born 2003) =

Serbian footballer (born 2003)

Personal information
- Full name: Igor Miladinović
- Date of birth: 8 June 2003 (age 23)
- Place of birth: Kruševac, Serbia and Montenegro
- Height: 1.70 m (5 ft 7 in)
- Position: Midfielder

Team information
- Current team: Partizan (on loan from Saint-Étienne)
- Number: 10

Youth career
- 2018–2022: Čukarički

Senior career*
Years	Team	Apps	(Gls)
2022–2024	Čukarički	46	(11)
2024–	Saint-Étienne	29	(1)
2024–2025	Saint-Étienne B	10	(3)
2026–	→ Partizan (loan)	12	(1)

International career^{‡}
2019–2020	Serbia U17	4	(1)
2021–2022	Serbia U19	8	(0)
2022–	Serbia U21	7	(0)
- * Club domestic league appearances and goals as of 22 November 2026 ‡ National team caps and goals as of 22 March 2024

Igor Miladinović (Serbian Cyrillic: Игор Миладиновић; born 8 June 2003) is a Serbian professional footballer who plays as a midfielder for Partizan, on loan from Ligue 2 club Saint-Étienne.

== Career ==
He started his career with Serbian side Čukarički. He was regarded as one of the club's most important players.

On 9 August 2024, he signed for Ligue 1 club Saint-Étienne for €3 million.

On 17 August 2026, Miladinović was loaned to Partizan with an option to buy.

== Style of play ==
He mainly operates as a midfielder. He has been described as "can play in the position of a defensive and central midfielder, although he prefers an offensive role".

== Personal life ==
He is the older brother of Serbian footballer Uroš Miladinović.
