= Ruslan Suanov =

Ruslan Suanov may refer to:

- Ruslan Suanov (footballer, born 1975), Russian football player
- Ruslan Suanov (footballer, born 1997), Russian football player
