= 2020–21 AS Saint-Étienne season =

AS Saint-Étienne
2020–21 season
- President: Bernard Caïazzo (Supervisory Board)
- Head coach: Claude Puel
- Stadium: Stade Geoffroy-Guichard
- Ligue 1: 11th
- Coupe de France: Round of 64
- Top goalscorer: League: Denis Bouanga; Wahbi Khazri (7 each); All: Denis Bouanga; Wahbi Khazri (7 each)
Home colours	Away colours	Third colours

The 2020–21 season was the 87th season in the existence of AS Saint-Étienne and the club's 17th consecutive season in the top flight of French football. In addition to the domestic league, Saint-Étienne participated in this season's edition of the Coupe de France. The season covered the period from 25 July 2020 to 30 June 2021.

== Players ==
=== First-team squad ===
As of 1 February 2021.

Note: Flags indicate national team as defined under FIFA eligibility rules; some limited exceptions apply. Players may hold more than one non-FIFA nationality.

No.	Pos.	Nation	Player
1	GK	FRA	Stefan Bajic
2	DF	CMR	Harold Moukoudi
4	DF	GRE	Panagiotis Retsos (on loan from Bayer Leverkusen)
5	DF	FRA	Timothée Kolodziejczak
6	DF	SEN	Pape Abou Cissé (on loan from Olympiacos)
7	MF	ALG	Ryad Boudebouz
8	MF	FRA	Mahdi Camara
9	FW	FRA	Charles Abi
10	FW	TUN	Wahbi Khazri
11	DF	BRA	Gabriel Silva
13	DF	PER	Miguel Trauco
14	FW	FRA	Anthony Modeste (on loan from 1. FC Köln)
15	MF	FRA	Bilal Benkhedim
17	MF	FRA	Adil Aouchiche

No.	Pos.	Nation	Player
18	FW	FRA	Arnaud Nordin
19	MF	CMR	Yvan Neyou (on loan from Braga)
20	MF	GAB	Denis Bouanga
21	FW	FRA	Romain Hamouma (vice-captain)
22	MF	FRA	Kévin Monnet-Paquet
26	DF	FRA	Mathieu Debuchy (captain)
27	DF	FRA	Yvann Maçon
28	MF	FRA	Zaydou Youssouf
30	GK	FRA	Jessy Moulin
31	DF	FRA	Alpha Sissoko
32	MF	FRA	Maxence Rivera
35	DF	GUI	Saïdou Sow
50	GK	SEN	Boubacar Fall

=== Out on loan ===
Note: Flags indicate national team as defined under FIFA eligibility rules; some limited exceptions apply. Players may hold more than one non-FIFA nationality.

No.	Pos.	Nation	Player
—	DF	GRE	Alexandros Katranis (at Hatayspor)
—	DF	ESP	Sergi Palencia (at Leganés)
—	FW	CIV	Jean-Philippe Krasso (at Le Mans)

No.	Pos.	Nation	Player
—	MF	SEN	Assane Dioussé (at MKE Ankaragücü)
—	FW	FRA	Lamine Ghezali (at Sporting Club Lyon)

== Transfers ==
=== In ===
No.	Pos	Player	Transferred from	Fee	Date	Source
14	FW	(Ivory Coast) Jean-Philippe Krasso	(France) Épinal		1 July 2020	
19	MF	(Cameroon) Yvan Neyou	(Portugal) Braga B	Loan	9 July 2020	
5	DF	(France) Timothée Kolodziejczak	(Mexico) UANL		17 July 2020	
17	MF	(France) Adil Aouchiche	(France) Paris Saint-Germain		20 July 2020	
4	DF	(Greece) Panagiotis Retsos	(Germany) Bayer Leverkusen	Loan	5 October 2020	

=== Out ===
Pos	Player	Transferred to	Fee	Date	Source
MF	(France) Yohan Cabaye	End of contract (retired)	N/A	1 July 2020	
DF	(Greece) Alexandros Katranis	(Turkey) Hatayspor	Loan	27 August 2020	

== Pre-season and friendlies ==
Win Draw Loss

28 July 2020 Friendly	Saint-Étienne	Cancelled	Troyes	Saint-Étienne, France
--:-- CEST (UTC+2)

1 August 2020 Friendly	Saint-Étienne	4–2	Bordeaux	Saint-Étienne, France
18:00 CEST (UTC+2)	Nordin 2'; Aouchiche 45'; Abi 47', 71'	Report	De Préville 34' (pen.); Briand 90+2'	Stadium: Stade Geoffroy-Guichard; Referee: Willy Delajod

7 August 2020 Friendly	Saint-Étienne	Cancelled	Hertha BSC	Saint-Étienne, France
18:00 CEST (UTC+2)				Stadium: Stade Geoffroy-Guichard

12 August 2020 Friendly	Rennes	3–0	Saint-Étienne	Rennes, France
19:00 CEST (UTC+2)	Bourigeaud (yellow card) 6'; Niang 29'; Terrier 83'; Del Castillo 85'	Report		Stadium: Roazhon Park

15 August 2020 Friendly	Nantes	Cancelled	Saint-Étienne	La Baule, France
18:00 CEST (UTC+2)				Stadium: Stade Moreau Défarges

15 August 2020 Friendly	Angers	1–0	Saint-Étienne	Angers, France
17:00 CEST (UTC+2)	Santamaria 20'; Kanga (yellow card) 56'	Report	Maçon (yellow card) 71'	Stadium: Stade Raymond Kopa; Referee: Jérôme Brisard

13 November 2020 Friendly	Saint-Étienne	3–2	Grenoble	Saint-Étienne, France
15:00 CET (UTC+1)	Rivera 33'; Abi 55'; Tormin 88'	Report	Djitté 17', 43'	Stadium: Stade Geoffroy-Guichard; Attendance: 0

== Competitions ==
=== Overview ===
Competition	First match	Last match	Starting round	Final position	Record							
Competition	First match	Last match	Starting round	Final position	Pld	W	D	L	GF	GA	GD	Win %
Ligue 1	30 August 2020	23 May 2021	Matchday 1	11th	38	12	10	16	42	54	−12	31.58
Coupe de France	11 February 2021		Round of 64	Round of 64	1	0	0	1	0	1	−1	0.00
Total					39	12	10	17	42	55	−13	30.77

Source: Soccerway

=== Ligue 1 ===
==== League table ====
Pos	Team	Pld	W	D	L	GF	GA	GD	Pts
9	Nice	38	15	7	16	50	53	−3	52
10	Metz	38	12	11	15	44	48	−4	47
11	Saint-Étienne	38	12	10	16	42	54	−12	46
12	Bordeaux	38	13	6	19	42	56	−14	45
13	Angers	38	12	8	18	40	58	−18	44

Source: Ligue 1
Rules for classification: 1) Points; 2) Goal difference; 3) Goals scored; 4) Head-to-head goal difference; 5) Fairplay ranking.

==== Results summary ====
Overall								Home						Away					
Pld	W	D	L	GF	GA	GD	Pts	W	D	L	GF	GA	GD	W	D	L	GF	GA	GD
38	12	10	16	42	54	−12	46	5	6	8	20	29	−9	7	4	8	22	25	−3

Source: Ligue 1

==== Results by round ====
Round	1	2	3	4	5	6	7	8	9	10	11	12	13	14	15	16	17	18	19	20	21	22	23	24	25	26	27	28	29	30	31	32	33	34	35	36	37	38
Ground	A	H	H	A	H	A	H	A	H	A	A	H	A	H	A	H	A	H	A	A	H	A	H	H	A	H	A	H	A	H	A	H	A	H	A	H	A	H
Result	W	W	W	D	L	L	L	L	L	L	L	D	D	D	W	D	D	D	L	L	L	W	D	W	W	D	L	L	W	L	W	W	L	L	W	W	D	L
Position	11	9	1	1	4	7	10	13	13	15	16	15	15	15	14	14	14	14	16	16	16	16	16	15	15	14	16	16	16	16	15	13	13	14	12	11	11	11

Source: Ligue 1
A = Away; H = Home; W = Win; D = Draw; L = Loss

==== Matches ====
The league fixtures were announced on 9 July 2020.

30 August 2020 2	Saint-Étienne	2–0	Lorient	Saint-Étienne
15:00 CEST (UTC+2)	Hamouma 19', 51'; Neyou (yellow card) 27'; Fofana (yellow card) 78'	Report	Le Fée (yellow card) 28'	Stadium: Stade Geoffroy-Guichard; Attendance: 3,050; Referee: Florent Batta

12 September 2020 3	Saint-Étienne	2–0	Strasbourg	Saint-Étienne
21:00 CEST (UTC+2)	Neyou (yellow card) 45+1'; Bouanga 57' (pen.); Camara 82'	Report	Bellegarde (yellow card) 7'; Sissoko (yellow card) 39'; Djiku (yellow card) 56'	Stadium: Stade Geoffroy-Guichard; Attendance: 4,300; Referee: Eric Wattellier

17 September 2020 1	Marseille	0–2	Saint-Étienne	Marseille
21:00 CEST (UTC+2)	Sakai (yellow card) 30'; Sanson (yellow card) 45+1'	Report	Hamouma 6'; Maçon (yellow card) 21'; Bouanga 75'; Gourna-Douath (yellow card) 85'	Stadium: Stade Vélodrome; Attendance: 990; Referee: Ruddy Buquet
Note: The match was originally scheduled for 21 August 2020, but was postponed after four Marseille players tested positive for COVID-19.

20 September 2020 4	Nantes	2–2	Saint-Étienne	Nantes
17:00 CEST (UTC+2)	Pallois (yellow card) 68'; Simon 71'; Emond 86'; Bamba (yellow card) 90'	Report	Aouchiche 2'; Moueffek (yellow card) 42'; Maçon 66'; Sidibe (yellow card) 84'	Stadium: Stade de la Beaujoire; Attendance: 5,000; Referee: Antony Gautier

26 September 2020 5	Saint-Étienne	0–3	Rennes	Saint-Étienne
17:00 CEST (UTC+2)	Neyou (yellow card) 90+4'	Report	Aguerd 33'; Guirassy 53'; Nzonzi (yellow card) 68'; Hunou 89'	Stadium: Stade Geoffroy-Guichard; Referee: Benoît Bastien

3 October 2020 6	Lens	2–0	Saint-Étienne	Lens
17:00 CEST (UTC+2)	Kakuta 15' (pen.), (yellow card) 68'; Sotoca 82'	Report	Kolodziejczak (red card) 14'; Maçon (yellow card) 64'; Khazri (red card) 64'	Stadium: Stade Bollaert-Delelis; Referee: Bastien Dechepy

18 October 2020 7	Saint-Étienne	1–3	Nice	Saint-Étienne
17:00 CEST (UTC+2)	Aouchiche 57'; Moukoudi (yellow card) 72'; Hamouma (yellow card) 90+3'	Report	Lees-Melou 8'; Gouiri 30'; Kamara (yellow card) 50'; Nsoki (yellow card) 58'; Benítez (yellow card) 67'; Lotomba (yellow card) 68'; Bambu (yellow card) 73'; Maolida 90+1'	Stadium: Stade Geoffroy-Guichard; Referee: Amaury Delerue

25 October 2020 8	Metz	2–0	Saint-Étienne	Metz
15:00 CET (UTC+1)	Boulaya 5'; Angban (yellow card) 32'; Maïga (yellow card) 73'; Sissoko 78' (o.g.); Pajot (yellow card) 82'	Report	Retsos (yellow card) 23'; Bouanga (yellow card) 31'; Neyou (yellow card) 72'	Stadium: Stade Saint-Symphorien; Attendance: 5,000; Referee: Karim Abed

1 November 2020 9	Saint-Étienne	0–1	Montpellier	Saint-Étienne
13:00 CET (UTC+1)	Khazri (yellow card) 31'; Hamouma (yellow card) 51'; Aouchiche (yellow card) 72'	Report	Mavididi 14'; Laborde (yellow card) 63'; Dolly (yellow card) 68'; Yun (yellow card) 90+1'	Stadium: Stade Geoffroy-Guichard; Attendance: 0 Referee: Jérôme Miguelgorry

8 November 2020 10	Lyon	2–1	Saint-Étienne	Décines-Charpieu
21:00 CET (UTC+1)	Caqueret (yellow card) 42'; Bruno Guimarães (yellow card) 51'; Kadewere 65', 74'; Cornet (yellow card) 68'; Paquetá (yellow card) 84'; Mendes (yellow card) 90+6'	Report	Lopes 40' (o.g.); Youssouf (yellow card) 53'; Gourna-Douath (yellow card) 65'; Bouanga (penalty missed) 88'; Moueffek (yellow card) 90+6'	Stadium: Parc Olympique Lyonnais; Attendance: 0 Referee: François Letexier

21 November 2020 11	Brest	4–1	Saint-Étienne	Brest
17:00 CET (UTC+1)	Honorat 7'; Duverne 23'; Brassier (yellow card) 30'; Cardona 33'; Mounié 38'	Report	Camara 31'; Trauco (yellow card) 55'	Stadium: Stade Francis-Le Blé; Attendance: 0 Referee: Thomas Léonard

29 November 2020 12	Saint-Étienne	1–1	Lille	Saint-Étienne
21:00 CET (UTC+1)	Neyou (yellow card) 16'; Khazri 33' (pen.); Camara (yellow card) 38'; Debuchy (yellow card) 52'; Kolodziejczak (yellow card) 67'	Report	Bradarić (yellow card) 28'; Ikoné 65'	Stadium: Stade Geoffroy-Guichard; Attendance: 0 Referee: Benoît Bastien

6 December 2020 13	Dijon	0–0	Saint-Étienne	Dijon
15:00 CET (UTC+1)		Report	Moukoudi (yellow card) 22'	Stadium: Stade Gaston Gérard; Attendance: 0 Referee: Ruddy Buquet

11 December 2020 14	Saint-Étienne	0–0	Angers	Saint-Étienne
21:00 CET (UTC+1)	Debuchy (yellow card) 33'; Moukoudi (yellow card) 39'; Camara (yellow card) 66'	Report	Capelle (yellow card) 85'; Doumbia (yellow card) 88'; El Melali (yellow card) 90+1'	Stadium: Stade Geoffroy-Guichard; Attendance: 0 Referee: Jérôme Miguelgorry

16 December 2020 15	Bordeaux	1–2	Saint-Étienne	Bordeaux
21:00 CET (UTC+1)	Kwateng (yellow card) 8'; Hwang 24'; Otávio (yellow card) 30'; Sabaly (yellow card) 54'	Report	Nordin 15'; Boudebouz (yellow card) 36'; Neyou 75'; Khazri (yellow card) 77'	Stadium: Matmut Atlantique; Attendance: 0 Referee: Stéphanie Frappart

20 December 2020 16	Saint-Étienne	2–2	Nîmes	Saint-Étienne
15:00 CET (UTC+1)	Moukoudi 8'; Hamouma (yellow card) 26'; Boudebouz (penalty missed) 36'; Nordin 63'; Neyou (yellow card) 82'	Report	Ahlinvi 14'; Eliasson (yellow card) 30'; Reynet (yellow card) 35'; Ripart 56' (pen.); Sarr (yellow card) 67'	Stadium: Stade Geoffroy-Guichard; Attendance: 0 Referee: Mikael Lesage

23 December 2020 17	Monaco	2–2	Saint-Étienne	Monaco
21:00 CET (UTC+1)	Diop 7'; Maripán (yellow card) 28'; Matazo (red card) 35'; Aguilar (yellow card) 40'; Volland 48', (yellow card) 71'	Report	Debuchy 21'; Bouanga 29' (pen.); Gourna-Douath (yellow card) 44'; Camara (yellow card) 81'	Stadium: Stade Louis II; Attendance: 0 Referee: Johan Hamel

6 January 2021 18	Saint-Étienne	1–1	Paris Saint-Germain	Saint-Étienne
21:00 CET (UTC+1)	Hamouma 19'; Retsos (yellow card) 77'	Report	Kean 22'; Draxler (yellow card) 83'	Stadium: Stade Geoffroy-Guichard; Attendance: 0 Referee: Clément Turpin

9 January 2021 19	Reims	3–1	Saint-Étienne	Reims
21:00 CET (UTC+1)	Dia 12' (pen.), 37'; Cassamá (yellow card) 14'; Mbuku (yellow card) 32'; Cafaro 59'	Report	Boudebouz (yellow card) 11'; Nordin (yellow card) 43'; Moulin (yellow card) 58'; Bouanga (yellow card) 69'; Abi 72'	Stadium: Stade Auguste-Delaune; Attendance: 0 Referee: Florent Batta

17 January 2021 20	Strasbourg	1–0	Saint-Étienne	Strasbourg
15:00 CET (UTC+1)	Ajorque 29'; Sissoko (yellow card) 36'; Aholou (yellow card) 51'	Report	Boudebouz (penalty missed) 10'; Gabard (yellow card) 12'; Gourna-Douath (yellow card) 56'	Stadium: Stade de la Meinau; Attendance: 0 Referee: Antony Gautier

24 January 2021 21	Saint-Étienne	0–5	Lyon	Saint-Étienne
21:00 CET (UTC+1)	Kolodziejczak (yellow card) 54'; Hamouma (yellow card) 74'; Bouanga (yellow card) 84'	Report	Kadewere 16', 68'; Bruno Guimarães (yellow card) 23'; Marcelo 36', 59'; Bouanga 82' (o.g.)	Stadium: Stade Geoffroy-Guichard; Attendance: 0 Referee: Benoît Bastien

31 January 2021 22	Nice	0–1	Saint-Étienne	Nice
13:00 CET (UTC+1)	Bambu (yellow card) 48'; Boudaoui (yellow card) 68'	Report	Moukoudi (yellow card) 41'; Gourna-Douath (yellow card) 78'; Abi 88'	Stadium: Allianz Riviera; Attendance: 0 Referee: Frank Schneider

3 February 2021 23	Saint-Étienne	1–1	Nantes	Saint-Étienne
21:00 CET (UTC+1)	Camara 57'; Cissé (yellow card) 61'; Khazri (yellow card) 80'; Bouanga (yellow card) 89'	Report	Kolo 36'; Girotto (yellow card) 65'	Stadium: Stade Geoffroy-Guichard; Attendance: 0 Referee: Eric Wattellier

7 February 2021 24	Saint-Étienne	1–0	Metz	Saint-Étienne
15:00 CET (UTC+1)	Boye 14' (o.g.); Hamouma (yellow card) 37'; Kolodziejczak (yellow card) 73'	Report	Maïga (yellow card) 25'; Centonze (yellow card) 73'	Stadium: Stade Geoffroy-Guichard; Attendance: 0 Referee: Ruddy Buquet

14 February 2021 25	Rennes	0–2	Saint-Étienne	Rennes
15:00 CET (UTC+1)	Doku (yellow card) 37'; Da Silva (yellow card) 48'; Guirassy (yellow card) 57'; Aguerd (yellow card) 63'; Traoré (yellow card) 77'	Report	Bouanga 27'; Debuchy (yellow card) 33'; Nordin 71'; Abi (yellow card) 80'	Stadium: Roazhon Park; Attendance: 0 Referee: Florent Batta

20 February 2021 26	Saint-Étienne	1–1	Reims	Saint-Étienne
13:00 CET (UTC+1)	Abi 89'	Report	Touré 72'; Mbuku (yellow card) 79'; Doumbia (yellow card) 89'	Stadium: Stade Geoffroy-Guichard; Attendance: 0 Referee: Antony Gautier

28 February 2021 27	Lorient	2–1	Saint-Étienne	Lorient
15:00 CET (UTC+1)	Chalobah (yellow card) 48'; Laurienté 66', 86'	Report	Moukoudi 14'; Debuchy (yellow card) 56'; Moueffek (yellow card) 73'; Gourna-Douath (yellow card) 84'	Stadium: Stade du Moustoir; Attendance: 0 Referee: Stéphanie Frappart

3 March 2021 28	Saint-Étienne	2–3	Lens	Saint-Étienne
19:00 CET (UTC+1)	Moukoudi (yellow card) 19', (goal) 40'; Debuchy (yellow card) 26'; Gourna-Douath (yellow card) 66'; Bouanga 90+4' (pen.)	Report	Sotoca 20' (pen.), (yellow card) 84'; Kalimuendo 24'; Banza (yellow card) 77'; Costa 90+2'	Stadium: Stade Geoffroy-Guichard; Attendance: 0 Referee: Amaury Delerue

13 March 2021 29	Angers	0–1	Saint-Étienne	Angers
13:00 CET (UTC+1)	Fulgini (yellow card) 88'	Report	Khazri 52'; Bouanga (yellow card) 54'; Aouchiche (yellow card) 59'	Stadium: Stade Raymond Kopa; Attendance: 0 Referee: Benoît Millot

19 March 2021 30	Saint-Étienne	0–4	Monaco	Saint-Étienne
21:00 CET (UTC+1)	Modeste (yellow card) 90+1'	Report	Jovetić (penalty missed) 12', 13', (yellow card) 38'; Badiashile (yellow card) 44'; Tchouaméni 55'; Diop 64'; Diatta 76'	Stadium: Stade Geoffroy-Guichard; Attendance: 0 Referee: Mikael Lesage

4 April 2021 31	Nîmes	0–2	Saint-Étienne	Nîmes
17:05 CEST (UTC+2)	Alakouch (yellow card) 11'; Ripart (yellow card) 37', (penalty missed) 87'; Cubas (yellow card) 43'; Duljević (yellow card) 89'; Briançon (yellow card) 89'	Report	Khazri 23', (yellow card) 45+1'; Bouanga 66', (yellow card) 76'	Stadium: Stade des Costières; Attendance: 0 Referee: Thomas Léonard

11 April 2021 32	Saint-Étienne	4–1	Bordeaux	Saint-Étienne
15:00 CEST (UTC+2)	Neyou (yellow card) 12'; Khazri 19' (pen.), 23', 72' (pen.); Bouanga (yellow card) 45'; Moukoudi (yellow card) 66'; Youssouf 81'	Report	Hwang 9' (pen.)	Stadium: Stade Geoffroy-Guichard; Attendance: 0 Referee: Frank Schneider

18 April 2021 33	Paris Saint-Germain	3–2	Saint-Étienne	Paris
13:00 CEST (UTC+2)	Mbappé 79', 87' (pen.); Kimpembe (yellow card) 85'; Icardi 90+6'	Report	Neyou (yellow card) 57'; Bouanga 78'; Hamouma 90+2'	Stadium: Parc des Princes; Attendance: 0 Referee: Ruddy Buquet

24 April 2021 34	Saint-Étienne	1–2	Brest	Saint-Étienne
13:00 CEST (UTC+2)	Khazri 11'; Youssouf (yellow card) 66'; Camara (yellow card) 90+1'	Report	Charbonnier 67', 79'; Belkebla (yellow card) 77'	Stadium: Stade Geoffroy-Guichard; Attendance: 0 Referee: Florent Batta

2 May 2021 35	Montpellier	1–2	Saint-Étienne	Montpellier
17:05 CEST (UTC+2)	Delort 6'; Benchama (yellow card) 80'; Dolly (yellow card) 90+1'	Report	Hamouma 16'; Gabriel Silva (yellow card) 47'; Debuchy 50'	Stadium: Stade de la Mosson; Attendance: 0 Referee: Karim Abed

9 May 2021 36	Saint-Étienne	1–0	Marseille	Saint-Étienne
13:00 CEST (UTC+2)	Nordin 43'; Kolodziejczak (yellow card) 76'	Report	Thauvin (yellow card) 63'; Balerdi (yellow card) 67'; Álvaro (yellow card) 85'	Stadium: Stade Geoffroy-Guichard; Attendance: 0 Referee: Johan Hamel

16 May 2021 37	Lille	0–0	Saint-Étienne	Villeneuve-d'Ascq
21:00 CEST (UTC+2)	André (yellow card) 26'	Report	Neyou (yellow card) 21'; Khazri (yellow card) 47'	Stadium: Stade Pierre-Mauroy; Attendance: 0 Referee: Jérôme Brisard

23 May 2021 38	Saint-Étienne	0–1	Dijon	Saint-Étienne
21:00 CEST (UTC+2)	Gourna-Douath (yellow card) 56'	Report	Kamara 39'; Konaté (penalty missed) 76'	Stadium: Stade Geoffroy-Guichard; Attendance: 0 Referee: Antony Gautier

=== Coupe de France ===
11 February 2021 Round of 64	Sochaux	1–0	Saint-Étienne	Montbéliard
18:45 CET (UTC+1)	Bedia 5'; Ambri (yellow card) 90+2'	Report	Cissé (yellow card) 37'	Stadium: Stade Auguste Bonal; Attendance: 0 Referee: Jérémy Stinat

== Statistics ==
=== Appearances and goals ===
No.	Pos	Nat	Player	Total		Ligue 1		Coupe de France	
No.	Pos	Nat	Player	Apps	Goals	Apps	Goals	Apps	Goals
Goalkeepers
1	GK	(France) FRA	Stefan Bajic	2	0	1	0	1	0
30	GK	(France) FRA	Jessy Moulin	29	0	29	0	0	0
40	GK	(England) ENG	Etienne Green	8	0	8	0	0	0
50	GK	(Senegal) SEN	Boubacar Fall	0	0	0	0	0	0
Defenders
2	DF	(Cameroon) CMR	Harold Moukoudi	26	3	26	3	0	0
4	DF	(Greece) GRE	Panagiotis Retsos	4	0	4	0	0	0
5	DF	(France) FRA	Timothée Kolodziejczak	25	0	23+1	0	1	0
6	DF	(Senegal) SEN	Pape Abou Cissé	15	0	14	0	1	0
11	DF	(Brazil) BRA	Gabriel Silva	4	0	4	0	0	0
13	DF	(Peru) PER	Miguel Trauco	27	0	22+4	0	1	0
26	DF	(France) FRA	Mathieu Debuchy	26	2	25+1	2	0	0
27	DF	(France) FRA	Yvann Maçon	6	1	6	1	0	0
31	DF	(France) FRA	Alpha Sissoko	9	0	6+3	0	0	0
35	DF	(Guinea) GUI	Saïdou Sow	16	0	10+5	0	1	0
42	DF	(France) FRA	Marvin Tshibuabua	1	0	0+1	0	0	0
	DF	(France) FRA	Rayan Souici	1	0	0+1	0	0	0
Midfielders
7	MF	(Algeria) ALG	Ryad Boudebouz	15	0	7+7	0	1	0
8	MF	(France) FRA	Mahdi Camara	38	3	37	3	0+1	0
15	MF	(France) FRA	Bilal Benkhedim	3	0	1+2	0	0	0
17	MF	(France) FRA	Adil Aouchiche	35	2	21+13	2	0+1	0
19	MF	(Cameroon) CMR	Yvan Neyou	31	1	29+2	1	0	0
20	MF	(Gabon) GAB	Denis Bouanga	36	7	30+6	7	0	0
22	MF	(France) FRA	Kévin Monnet-Paquet	17	0	7+9	0	1	0
28	MF	(France) FRA	Zaydou Youssouf	30	1	14+15	1	1	0
32	MF	(France) FRA	Maxence Rivera	18	0	1+16	0	0+1	0
33	MF	(France) FRA	Lucas Gourna-Douath	30	0	13+17	0	0	0
34	MF	(France) FRA	Aimen Moueffek	20	0	6+13	0	1	0
36	MF	(France) FRA	Baptiste Gabard	2	0	2	0	0	0
37	MF	(France) FRA	Mathys Saban	1	0	0+1	0	0	0
Forwards
9	FW	(France) FRA	Charles Abi	25	3	9+15	3	1	0
10	FW	(Tunisia) TUN	Wahbi Khazri	23	7	16+6	7	0+1	0
14	FW	(France) FRA	Anthony Modeste	8	0	3+4	0	0+1	0
18	FW	(France) FRA	Arnaud Nordin	35	4	20+14	4	1	0
21	FW	(France) FRA	Romain Hamouma	29	6	19+10	6	0	0
38	FW	(France) FRA	Tyrone Tormin	3	0	0+3	0	0	0
	FW	(France) FRA	Abdoulaye Sidibé	1	0	0+1	0	0	0
	FW	(France) FRA	Yanis Lhéry	0	0	0	0	0	0
Players transferred out during the season
14	FW	(Ivory Coast) CIV	Jean-Philippe Krasso	14	5	9+5	5	0	0

Last updated: 23 May 2021

=== Goalscorers ===
As of 18 October 2020

Rank	No.	Pos	Nat	Name	Ligue 1	Coupe de France	Total
1	21	FW	(France)	Romain Hamouma	3	0	3
2	17	MF	(France)	Adil Aouchiche	2	0	2
2	20	MF	(Gabon)	Denis Bouanga	2	0	2
3	27	DF	(France)	Yvann Maçon	1	0	1
3	8	MF	(France)	Mahdi Camara	1	0	1
Totals					9	0	9
