= Kirill Moiseyev =

Russian footballer

Personal information
- Full name: Kirill Ivanovich Moiseyev
- Date of birth: 28 May 2004 (age 22)
- Place of birth: Oktyabrsky, Russia
- Height: 1.78 m (5 ft 10 in)
- Position: Centre-forward

Team information
- Current team: Shakhtyor Donetsk (on loan from Rostov)
- Number: 53

Youth career
- –2020: SShOR Football Vladimir
- 2021–2022: Rostov

Senior career*
Years	Team	Apps	(Gls)
2020–2021	Torpedo Vladimir	9	(2)
2022–	Rostov	0	(0)
2022–2023	→ Rubin Kazan (loan)	0	(0)
2024–2025	→ Rostov-2	47	(12)
2025–2026	→ Neftekhimik Nizhnekamsk (loan)	17	(0)
2026–	→ Shakhtyor Donetsk (loan)	11	(1)
- * Club domestic league appearances and goals as of 31 October 2026

Kirill Ivanovich Moiseyev (Russian: Кирилл Иванович Моисеев; born 28 May 2004) is a Russian professional football player who plays as a centre-forward for Shakhtyor Donetsk on loan from Rostov.

== Career ==
Moiseyev made his debut for Rostov on 17 April 2024 in a Russian Cup game against FC Ural Yekaterinburg.

== Career statistics ==
As of 16 November 2024

Club	Season	League			Cup		Continental		Other		Total	
Club	Season	Division	Apps	Goals	Apps	Goals	Apps	Goals	Apps	Goals	Apps	Goals
Torpedo Vladimir	2020–21	Russian Second League	9	2	1	0	–		–		10	2
Rubin Kazan (loan)	2022–23	Russian First League	0	0	1	0	–		–		1	0
Rostov	2023–24	Russian Premier League	0	0	1	0	–		–		1	0
Rostov-2	2024	Russian Second League B	30	6	–		–		–		30	6
Career total			39	8	3	0	0	0	0	0	42	8
