= Verkhnedonskoy District =

Verkhnedonskoy District Верхнедонской район (Russian)
- District
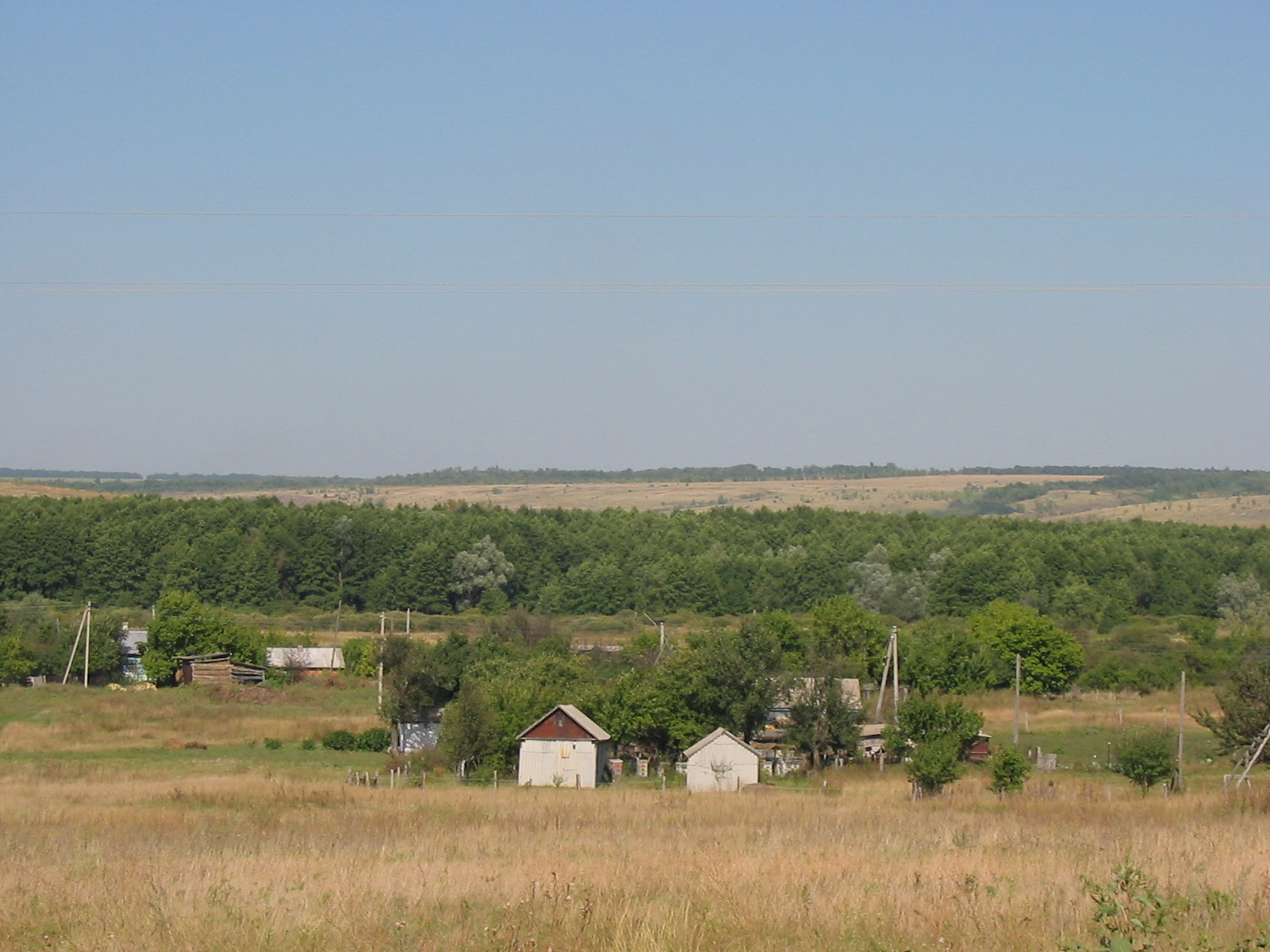
- Farm in Verkhnedonskoy District

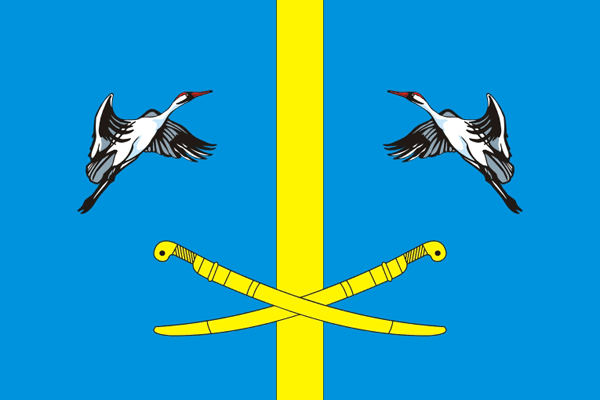
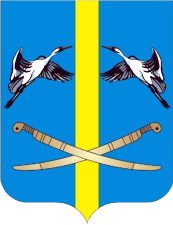
- Flag Coat of arms
- Location of Verkhnedonskoy District in Rostov Oblast
- Coordinates: 49°48′N 41°08′E
- Country: Russia
- Federal subject: Rostov Oblast
- Established: 1924
- Administrative center: Kazanskaya

Area
  - Total: 2,675 km^{2} (1,033 sq mi)

Population (2010 Census)
  - Total: 20,441
  - Density: 7.641/km^{2} (19.79/sq mi)
  - Urban: 0%
  - Rural: 100%

Administrative structure
  - Administrative divisions: 10 rural settlement
  - Inhabited localities: 59 rural localities

Municipal structure
  - Municipally incorporated as: Verkhnedonskoy Municipal District
  - Municipal divisions: 0 urban settlements, 10 rural settlements
- Time zone: UTC+3 (MSK)
- OKTMO ID: 60608000
- Website: http://verhnedon.donland.ru/

Verkhnedonskoy District (Russian: Верхнедонско́й райо́н) is an administrative and municipal district (raion), one of the forty-three districts in Rostov Oblast, Russia. It is located in the north of the oblast. The area of the district is 2,675 square kilometers (1,033 sq mi). Its administrative center is the rural locality (stanitsa) of Kazanskaya. Population: 20,441 (2010 Census); 23,327 (2002 census); 26,575 (1989 Soviet census). The population of Kazanskaya accounts for 23.1% of the district's total population.

== Notable residents ==
- Dmitri Kartashov (born 1994 in Kazanskaya), football player
