= Vadim Konyukhov =

Russian footballer

Personal information
- Full name: Vadim Alekseyevich Konyukhov
- Date of birth: 5 January 2002 (age 24)
- Place of birth: Nizhny Novgorod, Russia
- Height: 1.75 m (5 ft 9 in)
- Position: Defender

Team information
- Current team: Shakhtyor Donetsk
- Number: 52

Youth career
- 2008–2015: Nizhny Novgorod
- 2015–2021: CSKA Moscow

Senior career*
Years	Team	Apps	(Gls)
2021–2024	CSKA Moscow	0	(0)
2021–2022	→ Zvezda Perm (loan)	23	(3)
2022–2023	→ Ufa (loan)	15	(1)
2023–2024	→ Akron Tolyatti (loan)	9	(0)
2023	→ Akron-2 Tolyatti (loan)	1	(0)
2024–2025	Veles Moscow	15	(0)
2025	Isloch Minsk Raion	3	(0)
2026	Mashuk-KMV Pyatigorsk	12	(0)
2026–	Shakhtyor Donetsk	7	(0)

International career^{‡}
2017–2018	Russia U-16	13	(0)
2018–2019	Russia U-17	10	(0)
2019	Russia U-18	3	(0)
2022	Russia U-21	1	(0)
- * Club domestic league appearances and goals as of 31 October 2026 ‡ National team caps and goals as of 16 November 2022

Vadim Alekseyevich Konyukhov (Russian: Вадим Алексеевич Конюхов; born 5 January 2002) is a Russian professional footballer who plays as a defender for Shakhtyor Donetsk.

== Career ==
He made his debut in the Russian Second League for Zvezda Perm on 20 July 2021, in a game against Novosibirsk.

He made his debut in the Russian First League for Ufa on 13 August 2022, in a game against Veles Moscow.

He made his debut in the Belarusian Premier League for Isloch Minsk Raion on 9 August 2025 in a game against BATE Borisov.
