= Georgi Makhatadze =

Russian footballer

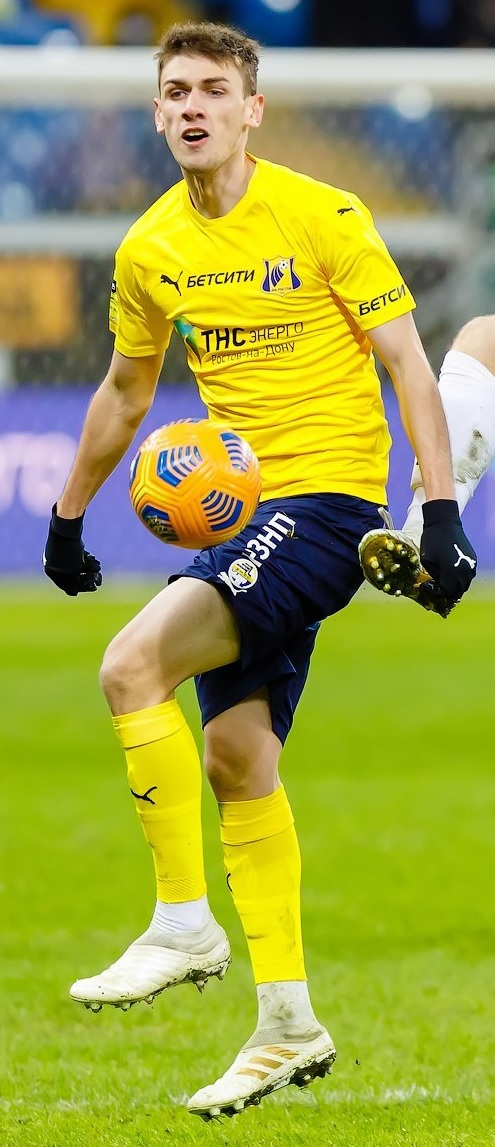
- Makhatadze with FC Rostov in 2021

Personal information
- Full name: Georgi Aleksandrovich Makhatadze
- Date of birth: 26 March 1998 (age 28)
- Place of birth: Rostov-on-Don, Russia
- Height: 1.80 m (5 ft 11 in)
- Position: Defensive midfielder

Team information
- Current team: Shakhtyor Donetsk
- Number: 21

Senior career*
Years	Team	Apps	(Gls)
2014–2016	Lokomotiv Moscow	1	(0)
2016–2018	Rubin Kazan	3	(0)
2018	→ SKA-Khabarovsk (loan)	1	(0)
2018–2020	Lokomotiv Moscow	0	(0)
2018–2020	→ Kazanka Moscow (loan)	43	(12)
2021	Rostov	10	(1)
2021–2022	Rotor Volgograd	27	(0)
2022–2026	Kuban Krasnodar	85	(2)
2026–	Shakhtyor Donetsk	27	(6)

International career^{‡}
2013	Russia U15	10	(0)
2013–2014	Russia U16	9	(0)
2014–2015	Russia U17	31	(12)
2016	Russia U18	5	(1)
2016	Russia U19	6	(4)
2018–2019	Russia U20	6	(1)
- * Club domestic league appearances and goals as of 31 October 2026 ‡ National team caps and goals as of 15 June 2019

Georgi Aleksandrovich Makhatadze (Russian: Георгий Александрович Махатадзе; born 26 March 1998) is a Russian professional football player who plays as a defensive midfielder for Shakhtyor Donetsk.

== Club career ==
He made his debut in the Russian Premier League for Lokomotiv Moscow on 21 May 2016 in a game against Mordovia Saransk.

On 24 August 2018, he was released from his contract with Rubin Kazan by mutual consent.

On 28 August 2018, he rejoined Lokomotiv, and was assigned to the farm-club Kazanka Moscow.

On 11 June 2021, he moved to Rotor Volgograd in the FNL.

== International ==
He represented Russia national under-17 football team in the 2015 UEFA European Under-17 Championship, in which he was selected for the team of the tournament, and later in the 2015 FIFA U-17 World Cup, in which he scored twice against South Africa.

== Career statistics ==
=== Club ===
As of 9 December 2017

Club	Season	League			Cup		Continental		Total	
Club	Season	Division	Apps	Goals	Apps	Goals	Apps	Goals	Apps	Goals
Lokomotiv Moscow	2013–14	Russian Premier League	0	0	0	0	–		0	0
Lokomotiv Moscow	2014–15	Russian Premier League	0	0	0	0	0	0	0	0
Lokomotiv Moscow	2015–16	Russian Premier League	1	0	0	0	0	0	1	0
Lokomotiv Moscow	Total		1	0	0	0	0	0	1	0
Rubin Kazan	2016–17	Russian Premier League	3	0	0	0	–		3	0
Rubin Kazan	2017–18	Russian Premier League	0	0	0	0	–		0	0
Rubin Kazan	Total		3	0	0	0	0	0	3	0
Career total			4	0	0	0	0	0	4	0

== Honours ==
Individual

- 2015 UEFA European Under-17 Championship Team of the Tournament
