= Aslan Mutaliyev =

Russian footballer

Personal information
- Full name: Aslan Magomedovich Mutaliyev
- Date of birth: 10 February 2002 (age 24)
- Place of birth: Nazran, Russia
- Height: 1.75 m (5 ft 9 in)
- Position: Left midfielder

Team information
- Current team: Shakhtyor Donetsk
- Number: 10

Youth career
- Spartak Moscow

Senior career*
Years	Team	Apps	(Gls)
2021–2022	Spartak-2 Moscow	12	(1)
2022	Veles Moscow	8	(0)
2023	Kuban Krasnodar	18	(0)
2023	Amkar Perm	9	(3)
2024–2025	Rubin-2 Kazan	32	(2)
2025	Volna Nizhny Novgorod Oblast	11	(0)
2026	Merani Martvili	1	(0)
2026–	Shakhtyor Donetsk	13	(0)

International career^{‡}
2017	Russia U16	3	(0)
2018–2019	Russia U17	5	(1)
- * Club domestic league appearances and goals as of 31 October 2026 ‡ National team caps and goals as of 10 May 2019

Aslan Magomedovich Mutaliyev (Russian: Аслан Магомедович Муталиев; born 10 February 2002) is a Russian professional football player who plays as a left midfielder for Shakhtyor Donetsk.

== Club career ==
He made his debut in the Russian Football National League for Spartak-2 Moscow on 15 May 2021 in a game against Chertanovo Moscow.

On 21 June 2022, Mutaliyev signed a three-year contract with Veles Moscow.

== International career ==
He represented Russia at the 2019 UEFA European Under-17 Championship and scored one goal, but Russia was eliminated in the group stage.
