= Sontje Hansen =

Curaçaoan footballer (born 2002)

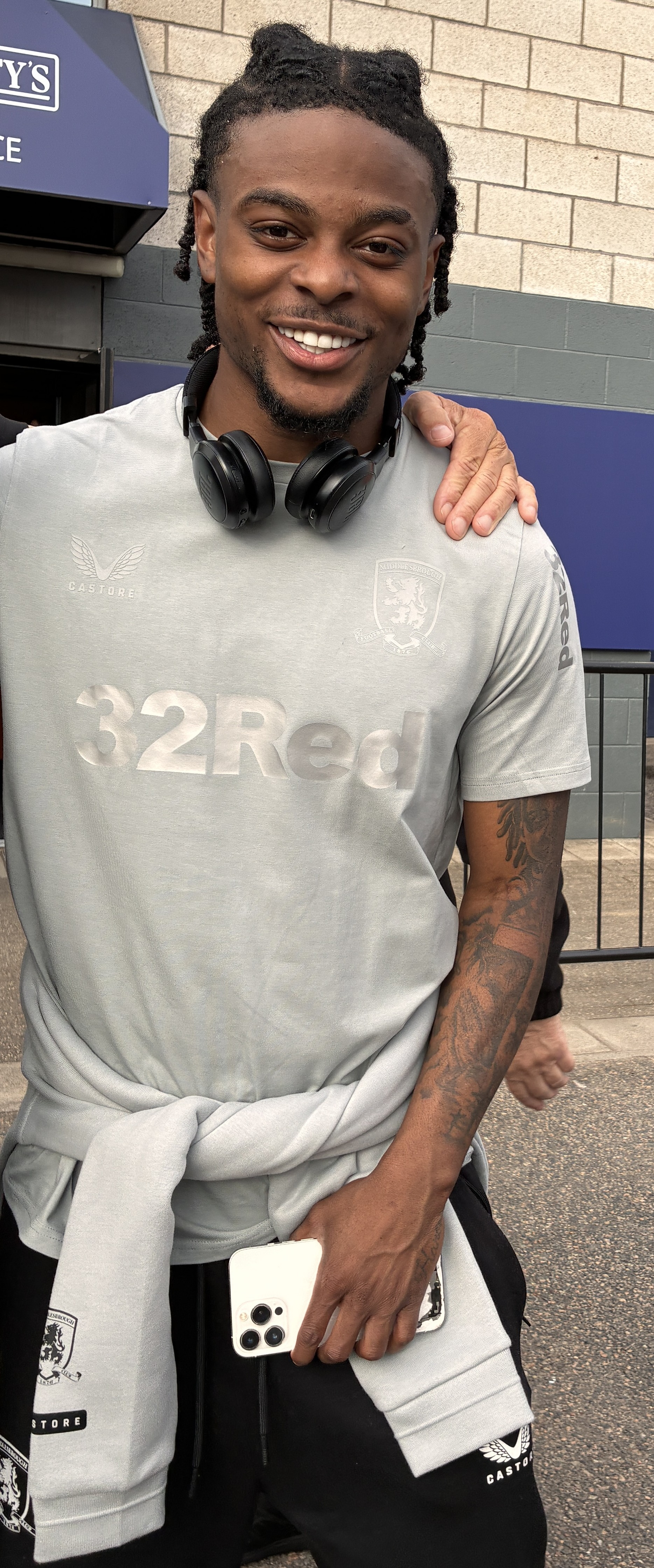
- Hansen in 2025.

Personal information
- Full name: Misjonne Juniffer Naigelino Hansen
- Date of birth: 18 May 2002 (age 24)
- Place of birth: Hoorn, Netherlands
- Height: 1.73 m (5 ft 8 in)
- Position: Winger

Team information
- Current team: Gaziantep (on loan from Middlesbrough)
- Number: 22

Youth career
- 2007–2011: HSV Sport 1889
- 2011–2012: Zwaluwen '30
- 2012–2013: Always Forward
- 2013–2023: Ajax

Senior career*
Years	Team	Apps	(Gls)
2019–2023	Jong Ajax	84	(13)
2019–2023	Ajax	1	(0)
2023–2025	NEC	65	(12)
2025–	Middlesbrough	17	(1)
2026–	→ Gaziantep (loan)	4	(0)

International career^{‡}
2017	Netherlands U15	5	(2)
2017–2018	Netherlands U16	7	(2)
2018–2019	Netherlands U17	24	(13)
2019	Netherlands U18	3	(0)
2023–2025	Netherlands U21	6	(1)
2025–	Curaçao	7	(1)
Medal record
Representing Netherlands
UEFA European Under-17 Championship
Winner	Ireland 2019	U-17 Team
- * Club domestic league appearances and goals as of 25 September 2026 ‡ National team caps and goals as of 14 June 2026

Misjonne Juniffer Naigelino "Sontje" Hansen (born 18 May 2002) is a professional footballer who plays as a winger for Süper Lig club Gaziantep, on loan from EFL Championship club Middlesbrough. Born in the Netherlands, he plays for the Curaçao national team.

== Early life and career ==
Born in Hoorn, Hansen began his football career at the age of five with local amateur club HSV Sport 1889, where his older brother Ricky also played. Their mother, Sonaida, raised them as a single parent and faced challenges, including a lengthy sick leave, which made it difficult to cover club fees and football gear expenses. In their time of need, the Leergeld West-Friesland Foundation stepped in, providing assistance to families with limited financial means. Thanks to this support, Hansen was able to pursue his development at the club. In 2011, he moved to Zwaluwen '30, and two years later, he earned admission to the Ajax Youth Academy.

== Club career ==
=== Ajax ===
Hansen signed his first senior contract with Ajax in May 2018, keeping him at the club until 2021.

On 13 December 2019, Hansen made his professional football debut for Jong Ajax, starting in an Eerste Divisie match against Cambuur and immediately scoring his first goal as Ajax secured a 2–0 away victory. Five days later, he made his first-team debut for Ajax on 18 December 2019 in a KNVB Cup match against Telstar. Four days later again, on 22 December, he played his first Eredivisie match against ADO Den Haag, coming on as a substitute in the 79th minute.

In the 2020–21 season, he played for Jong Ajax again, participating in 28 out of 33 matches and contributing with three goals and five assists. During the first half of the 2021–22 season, a knee injury sidelined him for nearly two months, and after recovery, he struggled to regain form, managing only three goals and two assists in 23 matches.

On 22 August 2022, he had a standout performance, scoring twice and providing one assist against De Graafschap in a 5–1 victory. However, for the remainder of the season, he only scored two more goals. In a total of 84 matches with Jong Ajax between 2019 and 2023, he ended up scoring thirteen goals and providing thirteen assists.

=== NEC ===
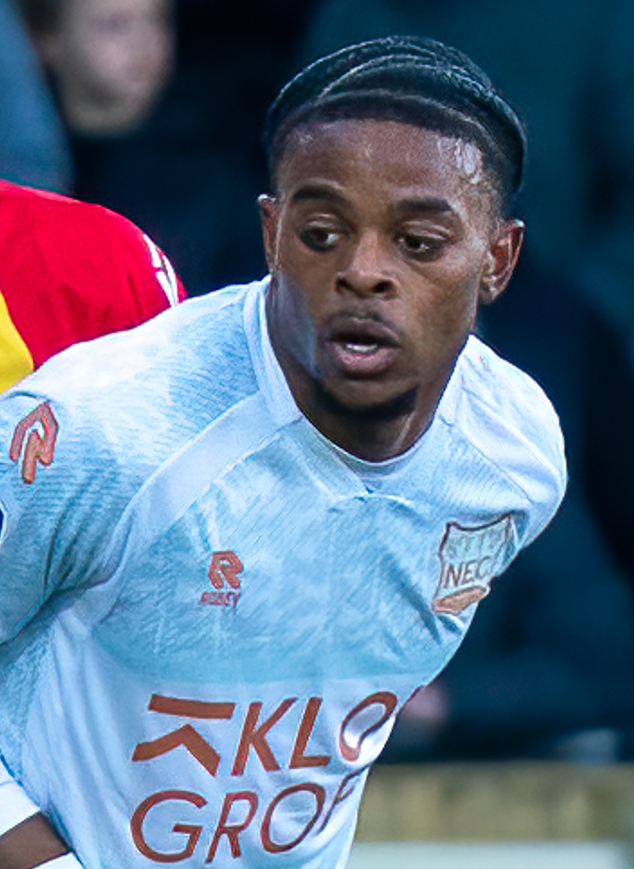
Hansen with NEC in 2024.

On 8 May 2023, it was officially announced that Hansen would join fellow Eredivisie side NEC at the start of the 2023–24 season, signing a five-year contract with the club. He made his competitive debut for the club on the first matchday of the season, also scoring his first goal for NEC in a 4–3 home loss to Excelsior on 13 August.

=== Middlesbrough ===
On 15 August 2025, Hansen signed for EFL Championship club Middlesbrough for £3.4 million. He made his debut the following day in a 3–0 away win against Millwall. In summer 2026, Hansen was loaned to Turkish Super Lig club Gaziantep.

== International career ==
=== Netherlands ===
Hansen has been a part of the Netherlands national youth football teams since February 2017. In May 2019, he won the UEFA European Under-17 Championship with the Netherlands U17 team and became the top goalscorer of the 2019 FIFA U-17 World Cup, with six goals.

During his time with the Netherlands under-17 team, he scored 13 goals in 24 matches, with only Daishawn Redan (20) and Brian Brobbey (16) scoring more for the team. Additionally, he featured in the under-15, under-16, and under-18 national teams.

On 8 September 2023, he made his debut for the Netherlands under-21 team with an assist to NEC Nijmegen teammate Dirk Proper in a 3–0 victory over Moldova U21.

=== Curaçao ===
On 26 September 2025, Hansen was called up to the Curaçao national team for the first time by manager Dick Advocaat. Five days later, his request to switch international allegiance to Curaçao was approved by FIFA. In May 2026, he was named in Curaçao's squad for the 2026 FIFA World Cup, the country's first-ever appearance at the tournament.

In September 2026, it was reported that Hansen would no longer accept call-ups to Curaçao long as Advocaat remained head coach.

== Career statistics ==
=== Club ===
As of match played 23 May 2026

Appearances and goals by club, season and competition
Club	Season	League			National cup (Note: Includes KNVB Cup, FA Cup)		League cup (Note: Includes EFL Cup)		Other		Total	
Club	Season	Division	Apps	Goals	Apps	Goals	Apps	Goals	Apps	Goals	Apps	Goals
Jong Ajax	2019–20	Eerste Divisie	10	3	—		—		—		10	3
Jong Ajax	2020–21	Eerste Divisie	28	3	—		—		—		28	3
Jong Ajax	2021–22	Eerste Divisie	23	3	—		—		—		23	3
Jong Ajax	2022–23	Eerste Divisie	23	4	—		—		—		23	4
Jong Ajax	Total		84	13	—		—		—		84	13
Ajax	2019–20	Eredivisie	1	0	1	0	—		—		2	0
NEC	2023–24	Eredivisie	33	6	5	0	—		—		38	6
NEC	2024–25	Eredivisie	32	6	2	1	—		—		34	7
NEC	Total		65	12	7	1	—		—		72	13
Middlesbrough	2025–26	EFL Championship	17	1	1	0	0	0	2 (Note: Appearances in EFL Championship play-offs)	0	20	1
Career total			167	26	9	1	0	0	2	0	178	27

=== International ===
As of match played 14 June 2026

Appearances and goals by national team and year
National team	Year	Apps	Goals
Curaçao	2025	3	1
Curaçao	2026	4	0
Total		7	1

Scores and results list Curaçao's goal tally first; score column indicates score after each Hansen goal.

List of international goals scored by Sontje Hansen
No.	Date	Venue	Opponent	Score	Result	Competition
1	14 November 2025	Bermuda National Stadium, Hamilton, Bermuda	Bermuda	4–0	7–1	2026 FIFA World Cup qualification

== Honours ==
Netherlands U17

- UEFA European Under-17 Championship: 2019

Individual

- FIFA U-17 World Cup Golden Boot: 2019
- UEFA European Under-17 Championship Team of the Tournament: 2019
