= Adil Aouchiche =

Footballer (born 2002)

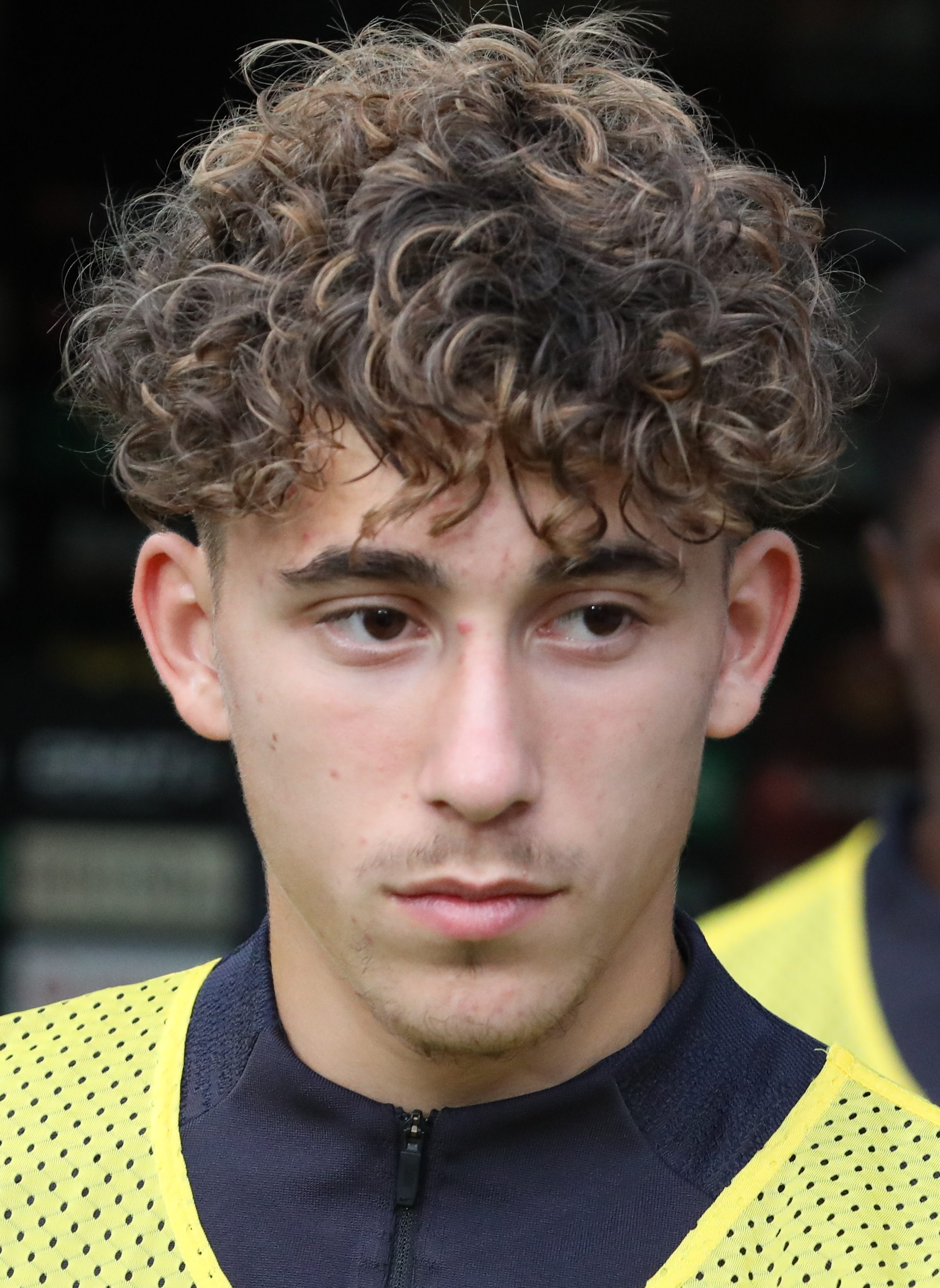
- Aouchiche with Paris Saint-Germain in 2019

Personal information
- Full name: Adil Aouchiche
- Date of birth: 15 July 2002 (age 24)
- Place of birth: Le Blanc-Mesnil, France
- Height: 1.81 m (5 ft 11 in)
- Position: Attacking midfielder

Team information
- Current team: Schalke 04
- Number: 24

Youth career
- 2008–2009: Mitry Mory
- 2009–2013: Tremblay FC
- 2014–2020: Paris Saint-Germain

Senior career*
Years	Team	Apps	(Gls)
2019–2020	Paris Saint-Germain	1	(0)
2020–2022	Saint-Étienne	71	(2)
2022	Lorient B	1	(0)
2022–2023	Lorient	11	(0)
2023–2026	Sunderland	36	(2)
2025	→ Portsmouth (loan)	12	(1)
2025–2026	→ Aberdeen (loan)	20	(3)
2026–	Schalke 04	18	(4)

International career^{‡}
2018	France U16	10	(1)
2018–2019	France U17	18	(14)
2019	France U18	12	(2)
2021–2022	France U20	8	(4)
2026–	Algeria	3	(0)
Medal record
Representing France
Men's football
FIFA U-17 World Cup
Third place	2019 Brazil
- * Club domestic league appearances and goals as of 29 September 2026 ‡ National team caps and goals as of 6 October 2026

Adil Aouchiche (French pronunciation: [adil auʃiʃ]; born 15 July 2002) is a professional footballer who plays as an attacking midfielder for Bundesliga club Schalke 04. Born in France, he plays for the Algeria national team.

== Club career ==
=== Paris Saint-Germain ===
An academy graduate of Paris Saint-Germain (PSG), Aouchiche made his professional debut on 30 August 2019 in a 2–0 league win against Metz. He started the match and played 65 minutes before getting replaced by Leandro Paredes. He scored his first goal on 5 January 2020 in a 6–0 Coupe de France win against Linas-Montlhéry. This made him the youngest player ever to score a goal for PSG in the Coupe de France at 17 years and 5 months. He made his third and final appearance for the club as a substitute in a 6–1 cup win against Dijon.

On 29 May 2020, Aouchiche underwent an introductory medical with Saint-Étienne ahead of a potential free transfer to the club. On 15 June 2020, he was nominated for the 2020 Golden Boy Award, being one of three PSG players in the 100-player shortlist.

=== Saint-Étienne ===
On 20 July 2020, Aouchiche signed for Ligue 1 club Saint-Étienne. He made his debut for the club in a 2–0 league win against Lorient on 30 August, and scored his first goal on 20 September in a 2–2 draw against Nantes.

=== Lorient ===
On 1 September 2022, Aouchiche joined Ligue 1 club Lorient on a four-year contract.

=== Sunderland ===
On 1 September 2023, Aouchiche joined English club Sunderland on a five-year contract.

==== Portsmouth (loan) ====
On 31 January 2025, Aouchiche signed for Portsmouth on loan until the end of the season.

==== Aberdeen (loan) ====
On 6 July 2025, Aouchiche signed for Aberdeen of the Scottish Premiership on season-long loan deal.

=== Schalke 04 ===
On 2 February 2026, Schalke 04 announced that they signed Aouchiche until 30 June 2027.

== International career ==
Born in France, Aouchiche holds French and Algerian nationalities, being born to both an Algerian mother and father. He is eligible to play for either France, his nation of birth, or Algeria, the nation of his parents. He is a current French youth international. He became the focus of attention in 2019 UEFA European Under-17 Championship due to his goalscoring prowess. Despite being a midfielder, he scored 9 goals from 5 matches in the tournament as France reached semi-finals. He scored a hat-trick against Sweden in a group stage match and netted another four goals in quarter-final clash against Czech Republic.

He went on to break several records during the tournament including that of scoring most goals in a single U17 Euro campaign, which was previously held by his compatriots Odsonne Édouard and Amine Gouiri for scoring 8 goals in 2015 and 2017 respectively. He also became the all-time top scorer in the history of UEFA European Under-17 Championship, a feat which was previously shared by Édouard, Gouiri and Abel Ruiz. His tally of 9 goals also equalled the record for most goals in any UEFA football national-team finals tournament, which he currently shares with Michel Platini, Elena Danilova and Shekiera Martinez. His stellar performances earned him a spot in the team of the tournament.

In March 2026, Aouchiche was called up to the Algeria national team for the first time. He made his debut on 27 March, coming on as a substitute in a 7–0 friendly win over Guatemala.

== Style of play ==
Aouchiche is an attacking midfielder, gifted with above-average technical skills. He excels in chance creation and dribbling.

== Career statistics ==
=== Club ===
As of match played 20 September 2026

Appearances and goals by club, season and competition
Club	Season	League			National cup (Note: Includes Coupe de France, FA Cup, Scottish Cup)		League cup (Note: Includes EFL Cup, Scottish League Cup)		Europe		Other		Total	
Club	Season	Division	Apps	Goals	Apps	Goals	Apps	Goals	Apps	Goals	Apps	Goals	Apps	Goals
Paris Saint-Germain	2019–20	Ligue 1	1	0	2	1	0	0	—		—		3	1
Saint-Étienne	2020–21	Ligue 1	34	2	1	0	—		—		—		35	2
Saint-Étienne	2021–22	Ligue 1	35	0	3	0	—		—		2 (Note: Appearances in Ligue 1 relegation/promotion play-offs)	0	40	0
Saint-Étienne	2022–23	Ligue 2	2	0	0	0	—		—		—		2	0
Saint-Étienne	Total		71	2	4	0	—		—		2	0	77	2
Lorient	2022–23	Ligue 1	11	0	2	1	—		—		—		13	1
Lorient B	2022–23	Championnat National 2	1	0	—		—		—		—		1	0
Sunderland	2023–24	Championship	28	2	0	0	0	0	—		—		28	2
Sunderland	2024–25	Championship	8	0	1	0	1	0	—		—		10	0
Sunderland	Total		36	2	1	0	1	0	—		—		38	2
Portsmouth (loan)	2024–25	Championship	12	1	—		—		—		—		12	1
Aberdeen (loan)	2025–26	Scottish Premiership	20	3	1	0	2	0	7 (Note: Two appearances in UEFA Europa League and five appearances in UEFA Conference League)	0	—		30	3
Schalke 04	2025–26	2. Bundesliga	14	3	—		—		—		—		14	3
Schalke 04	2026–27	Bundesliga	4	1	1	0	—		—		—		5	1
Schalke 04	Total		18	4	1	0	—		—		—		19	4
Career total			170	12	11	2	3	0	7	0	2	0	193	14

=== International ===
As of match played 6 October 2026

Appearances and goals by national team and year
National team	Year	Apps	Goals
Algeria	2026	3	0
Total		3	0

== Honours ==
Paris Saint-Germain

- Ligue 1: 2019–20
- Coupe de France: 2019–20

Schalke 04

- 2. Bundesliga: 2025–26

France U17

- FIFA U-17 World Cup third place: 2019

Individual

- FIFA U-17 World Cup Silver Ball: 2019
- UEFA European Under-17 Championship Top goalscorer: 2019
- UEFA European Under-17 Championship Team of the Tournament: 2019
- Maurice Revello Tournament Best XI: 2022
