= Dmitri Kartashov =

Russian footballer

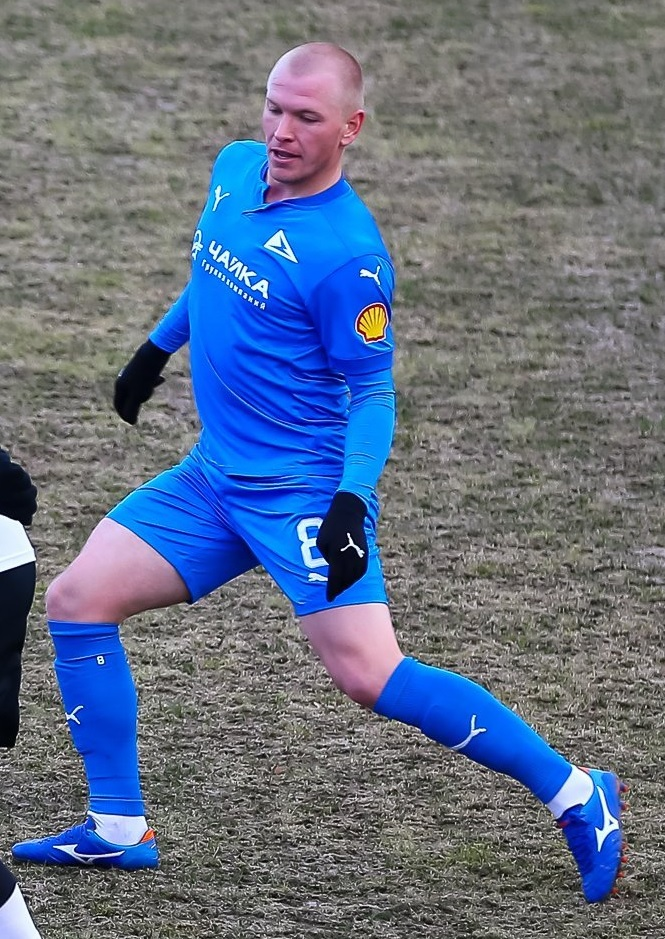
- Kartashov with Chayka in 2021

Personal information
- Full name: Dmitri Sergeyevich Kartashov
- Date of birth: 26 August 1994 (age 32)
- Place of birth: Kazanskaya, Russia
- Height: 1.76 m (5 ft 9 in)
- Position: Midfielder

Team information
- Current team: Shakhtyor Donetsk
- Number: 8

Senior career*
| Years | Team | Apps | (Gls) |
| 2011–2012 | Verkhniy Don Kazanskaya | | |
| 2013–2014 | Dongazdobycha Sulin | | |
| 2014–2015 | Chayka Peschanokopskoye (amateur) | | |
| 2016–2022 | Chayka Peschanokopskoye | 150 | (8) |
| 2022–2025 | Forte Taganrog | 86 | (1) |
| 2025 | Kuban-Holding | 18 | (1) |
| 2026– | Shakhtyor Donetsk | 27 | (0) |
- * Club domestic league appearances and goals as of 31 October 2026

Dmitri Sergeyevich Kartashov (Russian: Дмитрий Сергеевич Карташов; born 26 August 1994) is a Russian professional football player who plays for Shakhtyor Donetsk.

== Club career ==
He made his debut in the Russian Professional Football League for Chayka Peschanokopskoye on 28 July 2016 in a game against Biolog-Novokubansk. He made his Russian Football National League debut for Chayka on 13 July 2019 in a game against Fakel Voronezh.
