= Bogdan Reykhmen =

Russian footballer

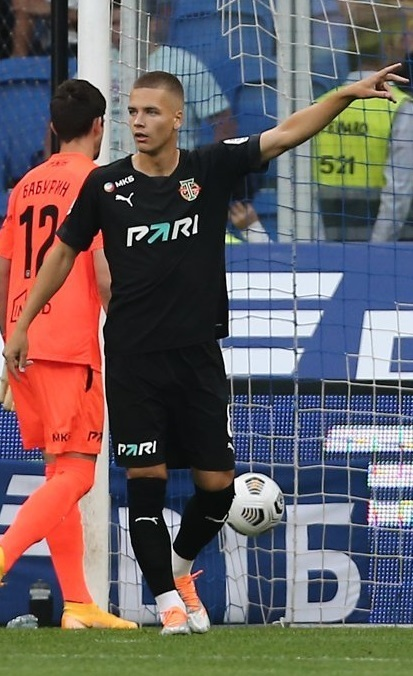
- Reykhmen with Torpedo Moscow in 2022

Personal information
- Full name: Bogdan Andreyevich Reykhmen
- Date of birth: 26 May 2002 (age 24)
- Place of birth: Yevpatoria, Ukraine
- Height: 1.80 m (5 ft 11 in)
- Position: Midfielder

Team information
- Current team: Shakhtyor Donetsk
- Number: 56

Youth career
- 2008–2012: Chayka Yevpatoria
- 2013–2014: Metalist Kharkiv
- 2014–2018: Krasnodar

Senior career*
Years	Team	Apps	(Gls)
2018–2022	Krasnodar	4	(0)
2018–2019	→ Krasnodar-3	10	(0)
2021–2022	→ Krasnodar-2	31	(3)
2022–2023	Torpedo Moscow	8	(0)
2023	→ KAMAZ (loan)	13	(1)
2023–2026	Kuban Krasnodar	72	(11)
2026	Voždovac	5	(0)
2026–	Shakhtyor Donetsk	13	(3)
- * Club domestic league appearances and goals as of 31 October 2026

Bogdan Andreyevich Reykhmen (Russian: Богдан Андреевич Рейхмен; born 26 May 2002) is a Russian professional football player who plays for Shakhtyor Donetsk.

== Club career ==
He made his debut in the Russian Football National League for Krasnodar-2 on 10 July 2021 in a game against Spartak-2 Moscow.

He made his Russian Premier League debut for Krasnodar on 5 December 2021 against Sochi.

On 22 June 2022, Reykhmen signed a contract with Torpedo Moscow for three seasons with an option for a fourth. On 13 January 2023, he was loaned to KAMAZ until the end of the season.

== Career statistics ==
As of 21 May 2022

Club	Season	League			Cup		Continental		Total	
Club	Season	Division	Apps	Goals	Apps	Goals	Apps	Goals	Apps	Goals
Krasnodar-3	2018–19	Second League	3	0	–		–		3	0
Krasnodar-3	2019–20	Second League	7	0	–		–		7	0
Krasnodar-3	Total		10	0	0	0	0	0	10	0
Krasnodar-2	2021–22	First League	31	3	–		–		31	3
Krasnodar	2021–22	Premier League	4	0	0	0	–		4	0
Torpedo Moscow	2022–23	Premier League	8	0	1	0	–		9	0
Career total			53	3	1	0	0	0	54	3
