= Samuel Giovane =

Italian footballer (born 2003)

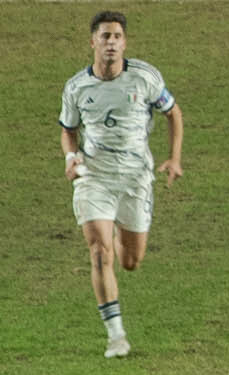
- Giovane playing for Italy U20 in 2023

Personal information
- Full name: Samuel Giovane
- Date of birth: 28 March 2003 (age 23)
- Place of birth: Ravenna, Italy
- Height: 1.78 m (5 ft 10 in)
- Positions: Midfielder; left-back

Team information
- Current team: Catanzaro
- Number: 14

Youth career
- –2017: Cesena
- 2017–2022: Atalanta

Senior career*
Years	Team	Apps	(Gls)
2022–2026	Atalanta	0	(0)
2022–2023	→ Ascoli (loan)	23	(0)
2023–2024	→ Ascoli (loan)	32	(0)
2024–2025	→ Carrarese (loan)	31	(1)
2025–2026	→ Palermo (loan)	16	(0)
2026–	Catanzaro	1	(0)

International career^{‡}
2018	Italy U15	9	(0)
2018	Italy U16	4	(1)
2019–2020	Italy U17	15	(1)
2019–2021	Italy U18	4	(0)
2021–2022	Italy U19	9	(0)
2022–2023	Italy U20	12	(0)
Medal record
Men's football
Representing Italy
FIFA U-20 World Cup
Runner-up	2023 Argentina
- * Club domestic league appearances and goals as of 21 August 2026 ‡ National team caps and goals as of 8 June 2023

Samuel Giovane (born 28 March 2003) is an Italian professional footballer who plays as a midfielder or left-back for Serie B club Catanzaro.

== Club career ==
Giovane switched from the youth system of Cesena to Atalanta before the 2017–18 season. He received his first call-up to Atalanta's senior squad in January 2022.

On 4 August 2022, Giovane moved to Ascoli in Serie B on a season-long loan. He made his Serie B debut for Ascoli on 3 September 2022 in a game against Cittadella. In August 2023, he returned to the club on a further season-long loan.

On 17 August 2024, Giovane was loaned by Carrarese.

On 30 August 2025, Giovane moved on loan to Serie B club Palermo, with an option/obligation to buy under specific conditions.

== International career ==
Giovane was first called up to represent his country in February 2018 for the Under-15 squad friendlies.

He then represented Italy at the 2019 UEFA European Under-17 Championship where they reached the final, 2019 FIFA U-17 World Cup and the 2022 UEFA European Under-19 Championship, where Giovane was the team's captain as Italy reached the semi-final.

In May 2023, he was included in the Italian squad that took part in the FIFA U-20 World Cup in Argentina, where the Azzurrini finished runners-up after losing to Uruguay in the final match.

== Honours ==
Italy U20

- FIFA U-20 World Cup runner-up: 2023
