= FC Shakhtyor Donetsk (2025) =

Shakhtyor Donetsk
- Full name: Football Club Shakhtyor Donetsk
- Nickname: Hirnyky
- Founded: 2025; 1 year ago (as Shakhtyor Donetsk)
- Ground: Forte-Arena, Taganrog
- Capacity: 3,400
- Manager: Viktor Kovalenko
- League: Russian Second League (Division B, group 1)
- 2026: 2nd
- Website: fcshd.ru
Home colours	Away colours

FC Shakhtyor Donetsk (Russian: ФК «Шахтёр» Донецк) is a Russian professional football club which is officially based in Donetsk (which is internationally recognised as part of Ukraine), but plays in Taganrog, Russia.

== Club history ==
=== Prelude ===
Following the Revolution of Dignity and the subsequent 2014 pro-Russian unrest in Ukraine, pro-Russian separatists seized parts of the Donetsk and Luhansk oblasts, including the capitals (Donetsk and Luhansk). As a consequence, FC Shakhtar Donetsk was not able to play their home games in the city, and has instead hosted their home games in other Ukrainian cities such as Kharkiv and Lviv, and since the 2022 Russian invasion of Ukraine, Shakhtar has played UEFA games in other countries such as Poland, Germany, among others. During the war, the Donetsk, Luhansk, Zaporizhzhia and Kherson oblasts were annexed by Russia on 30 September 2022, making clubs based in Donetsk eligible to enter the Russian competition system.

Former Shakhtar players Viktor Zvyahintsev and Yuriy Dehteryov chose to remain in Donetsk and participated in the breakaway Football Association of Donetsk Oblast, which later paved the way for the creation of the new club.

=== Formation ===
The club was formed in 2025 under the name Shakhtyor ("Shakhtyor" and "Shakhtar" are the words for "miner" in Russian and Ukrainian respectively). Former Shakhtar player Ihor Petrov was made its first president. As Donbas Arena has not been available to use since 2014 due to the war in Donbas, the club signed a five-year contract with Forte-Arena stadium in Taganrog, Russia, approximately 120 km away from Donetsk in November 2025, whose stadium was available as local club FC Forte Taganrog was dissolved shortly before. Shakhtyor was licensed for the fourth-tier Russian Second League Division B. It was assigned to group 1.

=== Commonwealth League ===
After achieving 1st place in 2025 with 51 points, Shakhtyor was inducted into the Russian Second League Division B. Currently, a reserve team of Shakhtyor, Shakhtyor-2 plays in the Commonwealth League with a number of other reserve teams from Crimea and Luhansk.

== Current squad ==
As of 11 September 2026

Note: Flags indicate national team as defined under FIFA eligibility rules; some limited exceptions apply. Players may hold more than one non-FIFA nationality.

No.	Pos.	Nation	Player
1	GK	UKR	Yaroslav Kotlyarov
2	DF	RUS	Vladimir Khozin
3	DF	RUS	Danila Kalin
5	DF	RUS	Yegor Truntayev
7	FW	RUS	Ilya Kozhukhar
8	MF	RUS	Dmitri Kartashov
9	FW	RUS	Ruslan Suanov
10	FW	RUS	Aslan Mutaliyev
14	DF	RUS	Dmitry Shcherban
18	MF	RUS	Yaroslav Razvyazov
19	FW	RUS	Ilya Gavrilchik
21	MF	RUS	Georgi Makhatadze
22	FW	RUS	Arseny Vlasenko
23	GK	RUS	Semyon Romanyukov

No.	Pos.	Nation	Player
24	DF	UKR	Ilya Martyuk
27	DF	RUS	Ilya Zakharov
29	MF	RUS	Gamid Dzhamuyev
30	MF	UKR	Yaroslav Maksimchuk
52	DF	RUS	Vadim Konyukhov
53	FW	RUS	Kirill Moiseyev (on loan from Rostov)
54	GK	RUS	Adam Shikhanmatov
56	MF	RUS	Bogdan Reykhmen
77	MF	RUS	Anton Orlov
78	DF	RUS	Daniil Melnikov
81	FW	RUS	Rakhim Chaadayev
91	FW	UKR	Andrey Trofimov
95	MF	RUS	Ayub Batsuyev

== See also ==
- Football Association of Donetsk Oblast
