= Ilya Golyatov =

Russian football player (born 2002)

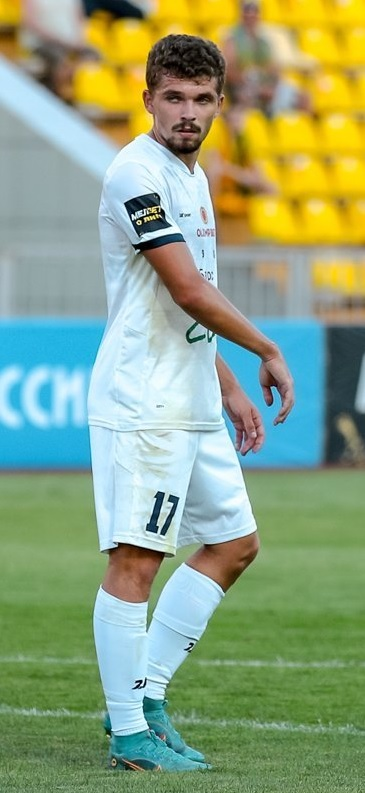
- Golyatov with KAMAZ Naberezhnye Chelny in 2022

Personal information
- Full name: Ilya Alekseyevich Golyatov
- Date of birth: 6 April 2002 (age 24)
- Place of birth: Zheleznogorsk, Kursk Oblast, Russia
- Height: 1.78 m (5 ft 10 in)
- Position: Forward

Team information
- Current team: FC Lit Energy Moscow (amateur)

Youth career
- –2014: DYuSSh-6 Kursk
- 2014–2015: SDYuSShOR Zheleznogorsk
- 2015–2020: FC Spartak Moscow

Senior career*
Years	Team	Apps	(Gls)
2021	FC Spartak-2 Moscow	18	(1)
2022	FC Volna Nizhny Novgorod Oblast	12	(4)
2022–2023	FC KAMAZ Naberezhnye Chelny	10	(0)
2023	→ FC Dynamo Vologda (loan)	11	(4)
2023	FC Amkar Perm	2	(0)
2023	FC Dynamo Vologda	9	(0)
2024	FC Goats Moscow (amateur)		
2024–	FC Lit Energy Moscow (amateur)		

International career^{‡}
2017–2018	Russia U-16	10	(0)
2018–2019	Russia U-17	11	(2)
- * Club domestic league appearances and goals as of 3 January 2025 ‡ National team caps and goals as of 10 May 2019

Ilya Alekseyevich Golyatov (Russian: Илья Алексеевич Голятов; born 6 April 2002) is a Russian football player. He plays for amateur club Lit Energy Moscow.

== Club career ==
He made his debut in the Russian Football National League for FC Spartak-2 Moscow on 3 April 2021 in a game against FC Chayka Peschanokopskoye.

== International career ==
He represented Russia at the 2019 UEFA European Under-17 Championship, he appeared in all three games Russia played at the tournament as it was eliminated at group stage.
