= 2019 UEFA European Under-17 Championship =

Tournament details
- Host country: Ireland
- Dates: 3–19 May
- Teams: 16 (from 1 confederation)
- Venue: 7 (in 4 host cities)

Final positions
- Champions: Netherlands (4th title)
- Runners-up: Italy

Tournament statistics
- Matches played: 32
- Goals scored: 104 (3.25 per match)
- Attendance: 47,456 (1,483 per match)
- Top scorer(s): (France) Adil Aouchiche (9 goals)

The 2019 UEFA European Under-17 Championship (also known as UEFA Under-17 Euro 2019) was the 18th edition of the UEFA European Under-17 Championship (37th edition if the Under-16 era is also included), the annual international youth football championship organised by UEFA for the men's under-17 national teams of Europe. Ireland was selected by UEFA on 9 December 2016 to hosted the tournament.

A total of 16 teams played in the tournament, with players born on or after 1 January 2002 eligible to participate. Starting from this season, up to five substitutions were permitted per team in each match. Moreover, each match has a regular duration of 90 minutes, instead of 80 minutes in previous seasons.

Same as previous editions held in odd-numbered years, the tournament acted as the UEFA qualifiers for the FIFA U-17 World Cup. The top five teams of the tournament qualified for the 2019 FIFA U-17 World Cup in Brazil as the UEFA representatives.

In the final, defending champions Netherlands defeated Italy 4–2 to win their fourth title.

== Qualification ==
All 55 UEFA nations entered the competition, and with the hosts Republic of Ireland qualifying automatically, the other 54 teams competed in the qualifying competition to determine the remaining 15 spots in the final tournament. The qualifying competition consisted of two rounds: Qualifying round, which took place in autumn 2018, and Elite round, which took place in spring 2019.

=== Qualified teams ===
The following teams qualified for the final tournament.

Note: All appearance statistics include only U-17 era (since 2002).

Team	Method of qualification	Appearance	Last appearance	Previous best performance
Republic of Ireland	Hosts	5th	2018 (quarter-finals)	Quarter-finals (2017, 2018)
Italy	Elite round Group 1 winners	9th	2018 (runners-up)	Runners-up (2013, 2018)
Austria	Elite round Group 1 runners-up	6th	2016 (quarter-finals)	Third place (2003)
Netherlands	Elite round Group 2 winners	13th	2018 (champions)	Champions (2011, 2012, 2018)
Czech Republic	Elite round Group 2 runners-up	6th	2015 (group stage)	Runners-up (2006)
England	Elite round Group 3 winners	14th	2018 (semi-finals)	Champions (2010, 2014)
Iceland	Elite round Group 4 winners	3rd	2012 (group stage)	Group stage (2007, 2012)
Germany	Elite round Group 4 runners-up	12th	2018 (group stage)	Champions (2009)
Spain	Elite round Group 5 winners	13th	2018 (quarter-finals)	Champions (2007, 2008, 2017)
Greece	Elite round Group 5 runners-up	3rd	2015 (group stage)	Group stage (2010, 2015)
Portugal	Elite round Group 6 winners	8th	2018 (group stage)	Champions (2003, 2016)
Russia	Elite round Group 6 runners-up	4th	2015 (semi-finals)	Champions (2006, 2013)
Belgium	Elite round Group 7 winners	7th	2018 (semi-finals)	Semi-finals (2007, 2015, 2018)
Hungary	Elite round Group 7 runners-up	5th	2017 (sixth place)	Quarter-finals (2017)
France	Elite round Group 8 winners	12th	2017 (fifth place)	Champions (2004, 2015)
Sweden	Elite round Group 8 runners-up	4th	2018 (quarter-finals)	Semi-finals (2013)

Notes

1. The best seven runners-up among all eight elite round groups qualified for the final tournament.

=== Final draw ===
The final draw was held on 4 April 2019, 18:30 IST (UTC+1), at the Aviva Stadium in Dublin, Republic of Ireland. The 16 teams were drawn into four groups of four teams. The hosts Republic of Ireland were assigned to position A1 in the draw, while the other teams were seeded according to their results in the qualification elite round. The seven best elite round group winners (counting all elite round results) were placed in Pot 1 and drawn to positions 1 and 2 in the groups, and the remaining eight teams (the eighth-best elite round group winner and the seven elite round group runners-up) were placed in Pot 2 and drawn to positions 3 and 4 in the groups.

Pos	Grp	Team	Pld	W	D	L	GF	GA	GD	Pts	Seeding
1	—	Republic of Ireland (H)	0	0	0	0	0	0	0	0	Host (A1)
2	2	Netherlands	3	3	0	0	12	2	+10	9	Pot 1
3	1	Italy	3	3	0	0	9	1	+8	9	Pot 1
4	7	Belgium	3	3	0	0	8	2	+6	9	Pot 1
5	8	France	3	3	0	0	6	0	+6	9	Pot 1
6	6	Portugal	3	3	0	0	6	2	+4	9	Pot 1
7	5	Spain	3	3	0	0	4	0	+4	9	Pot 1
8	4	Iceland	3	2	1	0	9	5	+4	7	Pot 1
9	3	England	3	2	1	0	8	4	+4	7	Pot 2
10	6	Russia	3	2	0	1	7	4	+3	6	Pot 2
11	5	Greece	3	2	0	1	3	2	+1	6	Pot 2
12	2	Czech Republic	3	2	0	1	5	5	0	6	Pot 2
13	7	Hungary	3	2	0	1	4	4	0	6	Pot 2
14	4	Germany	3	1	2	0	5	4	+1	5	Pot 2
15	1	Austria	3	1	1	1	6	5	+1	4	Pot 2
16	8	Sweden	3	1	1	1	2	3	−1	4	Pot 2

Source: UEFA
Rules for classification: 1) points; 2) goal difference; 3) goals scored; 4) disciplinary points; 5) coefficient; 6) drawing of lots.
(H) Hosts

== Venues ==
The tournament was hosted in seven venues:

Dublin	2019 UEFA European Under-17 Championship (Ireland)	Longford
Tallaght Stadium	2019 UEFA European Under-17 Championship (Ireland)	City Calling Stadium
Capacity: 8,183	2019 UEFA European Under-17 Championship (Ireland)	Capacity: 3,578
4 group matches, 1 quarter-final, 1 semi-final, final	2019 UEFA European Under-17 Championship (Ireland)	4 group matches
Waterford	2019 UEFA European Under-17 Championship (Dublin)	Bray
Waterford Regional Sports Centre	2019 UEFA European Under-17 Championship (Dublin)	Carlisle Grounds
Capacity: 2,978	2019 UEFA European Under-17 Championship (Dublin)	Capacity: 2,122
4 group matches	2019 UEFA European Under-17 Championship (Dublin)	2 group matches, 1 quarter-final
Dublin
Tolka Park	UCD Bowl	Whitehall Stadium
Capacity: 3,707	Capacity: 3,000	Capacity: 2,500
2 group matches, 1 quarter-final, FIFA Play-Off	4 group matches, 1 quarter-final, 1 semi-final	4 group matches

== Match officials ==
A total of 8 referees, 12 assistant referees and 4 fourth officials were appointed for the final tournament.

Referees

- (Denmark) Jørgen Daugbjerg Burchardt
- (Lithuania) Manfredas Lukjančukas
- (Malta) Trustin Farrugia Cann
- (Norway) Espen Eskås
- (Poland) Krzysztof Jakubik
- (Scotland) Donald Robertson
- (Slovenia) Rade Obrenović
- (Ukraine) Mykola Balakin

Assistant referees

- (Albania) Ilir Tartaraj
- (Belarus) Yauheni Ramanau
- (Bulgaria) Deniz Sokolov
- (Faroe Islands) Jan Hermansen
- (Finland) Riku Vihreävuori
- (Iceland) Gylfi Mar Sigurdsson
- (Kosovo) Fatlum Berisha
- (Kazakhstan) Sergey Vassyutin
- (Latvia) Raimonds Tatriks
- (Luxembourg) Joaquim Da Silva
- (Slovakia) Frantisek Ferenc
- (Wales) Lewiss Ross Edwards

Fourth officials

- (Finland) Kaarlo Oskari Hämäläinen
- (Finland) Petri Viljanen
- (Republic of Ireland) Paul McLaughlin
- (Wales) Iwan Arwel Griffith

== Squads ==
Each national team have to submit a squad of 20 players (Regulations Article 38).

== Group stage ==
The final tournament schedule was announced on 11 April 2019.

The group winners and runners-up advance to the quarter-finals.

Tiebreakers

In the group stage, teams are ranked according to points (3 points for a win, 1 point for a draw, 0 points for a loss), and if tied on points, the following tiebreaking criteria are applied, in the order given, to determine the rankings (Regulations Articles 17.01 and 17.02):

1. Points in head-to-head matches among tied teams;
2. Goal difference in head-to-head matches among tied teams;
3. Goals scored in head-to-head matches among tied teams;
4. If more than two teams are tied, and after applying all head-to-head criteria above, a subset of teams are still tied, all head-to-head criteria above are reapplied exclusively to this subset of teams;
5. Goal difference in all group matches;
6. Goals scored in all group matches;
7. Penalty shoot-out if only two teams have the same number of points, and they met in the last round of the group and are tied after applying all criteria above (not used if more than two teams have the same number of points, or if their rankings are not relevant for qualification for the next stage);
8. Disciplinary points (red card = 3 points, yellow card = 1 point, expulsion for two yellow cards in one match = 3 points);
9. UEFA coefficient for the qualifying round draw;
10. Drawing of lots.

All times are local, IST (UTC+1).

=== Group A ===
Pos	Team	Pld	W	D	L	GF	GA	GD	Pts	Qualification
1	Belgium	3	1	2	0	5	2	+3	5	Knockout stage
2	Czech Republic	3	1	2	0	4	2	+2	5	Knockout stage
3	Republic of Ireland (H)	3	0	3	0	3	3	0	3	
4	Greece	3	0	1	2	1	6	−5	1	

Source: UEFA
Rules for classification: Group stage tiebreakers
(H) Hosts
3 May 2019
12:00

Czech Republic	1–1	Belgium
De Wolf 53' (o.g.)	Report	Baeten 90+5'

Tolka Park, Dublin
Attendance: 714
Referee: Mykola Balakin (Ukraine)
3 May 2019
19:00

Republic of Ireland	1–1	Greece
Everitt 58'	Report	Arsenidis 90+6'

Tallaght Stadium, Dublin
Attendance: 4,265
Referee: Jørgen Burchardt (Denmark)

6 May 2019
17:00

Belgium	3–0	Greece
Kalulika 21'; Baeten 42', 90+1'	Report

City Calling Stadium, Longford
Attendance: 712
Referee: Farrugia Cann Trustin (Malta)
6 May 2019
19:00

Republic of Ireland	1–1	Czech Republic
Omobamidele 88'	Report	Sejk 63'

Waterford Regional Sports Centre, Waterford
Attendance: 2,613
Referee: Rade Obrenović (Slovenia)

9 May 2019
19:00

Belgium	1–1	Republic of Ireland
Kalulika 65'	Report	Sobowale 74'

Tallaght Stadium, Dublin
Attendance: 4,885
Referee: Krzysztof Jakubik (Poland)
9 May 2019
19:00

Greece	0–2	Czech Republic
	Report	Sejk 53'; Pech 65'

Carlisle Grounds, Bray
Attendance: 673
Referee: Manfredas Lukjančukas (Lithuania)

=== Group B ===
Pos	Team	Pld	W	D	L	GF	GA	GD	Pts	Qualification
1	France	3	2	1	0	7	3	+4	7	Knockout stage
2	Netherlands	3	2	0	1	7	4	+3	6	Knockout stage
3	England	3	1	1	1	6	7	−1	4	
4	Sweden	3	0	0	3	3	9	−6	0	

Source: UEFA
Rules for classification: Group stage tiebreakers
3 May 2019
17:00

Netherlands	2–0	Sweden
Brobbey 33'; Maatsen 34'	Report

Waterford Regional Sports Centre, Waterford
Attendance: 381
Referee: Krzysztof Jakubik (Poland)
3 May 2019
19:30

England	1–1	France
Greenwood 34' (pen.)	Report	Aouchiche 79'

City Calling Stadium, Longford
Attendance: 1,627
Referee: Rade Obrenović (Slovenia)

6 May 2019
15:00

Netherlands	5–2	England
Brobbey 10', 58' (pen.); Bannis 35'; Hansen 45+1'; Ünüvar 61'	Report	Harwood-Bellis 7'; Greenwood 34' (pen.)

Tolka Park, Dublin
Attendance: 2,411
Referee: Manfredas Lukjančukas (Lithuania)
6 May 2019
17:00

France	4–2	Sweden
Aouchiche 22', 39', 45+2'; Rutter 80'	Report	Elanga 17', 29'

Tallaght Stadium, Dublin
Attendance: 1,027
Referee: Donald Robertson (Scotland)

9 May 2019
16:30

France	2–0	Netherlands
Aouchiche 1'; Mbuku 11'	Report

UCD Bowl, Dublin
Attendance: 617
Referee: Mykola Balakin (Ukraine)
9 May 2019
16:30

Sweden	1–3	England
Prica 28'	Report	Greenwood 15'; Jenks 76'; Gelhardt 82'

Whitehall Stadium, Dublin
Attendance: 522
Referee: Espen Eskås (Norway)

=== Group C ===
Pos	Team	Pld	W	D	L	GF	GA	GD	Pts	Qualification
1	Hungary	3	3	0	0	6	3	+3	9	Knockout stage
2	Portugal	3	2	0	1	6	4	+2	6	Knockout stage
3	Iceland	3	1	0	2	6	8	−2	3	
4	Russia	3	0	0	3	5	8	−3	0	

Source: UEFA
Rules for classification: Group stage tiebreakers
4 May 2019
14:00

Iceland	3–2	Russia
Savinov 18' (o.g.); Gíslason 28'; Guðjohnsen 32' (pen.)	Report	Golyatov 64', 79'

Whitehall Stadium, Dublin
Attendance: 665
Referee: Espen Eskås (Norway)
4 May 2019
19:00

Hungary	1–0	Portugal
Kosznovszky 80'	Report

UCD Bowl, Dublin
Attendance: 702
Referee: Farrugia Cann Trustin (Malta)

7 May 2019
12:00

Iceland	1–2	Hungary
Ellertsson 48'	Report	Molnár 31'; Németh 90' (pen.)

Whitehall Stadium, Dublin
Attendance: 878
Referee: Mykola Balakin (Ukraine)
7 May 2019
15:00

Portugal	2–1	Russia
Batalha 16'; Sousa 50'	Report	Shchetinin 68' (pen.)

UCD Bowl, Dublin
Attendance: 445
Referee: Krzysztof Jakubik (Poland)

10 May 2019
17:00

Portugal	4–2	Iceland
Tavares 32'; Silva 46'; Bernardo 76'; Cruz 84'	Report	Jóhannesson 37'; Ellertsson 71'

City Calling Stadium, Longford
Attendance: 780
Referee: Donald Robertson (Scotland)
10 May 2019
17:00

Russia	2–3	Hungary
Shapovalov 20'; Mutaliyev 87'	Report	Németh 33', 90+4'; Major 71' (pen.)

Waterford Regional Sports Centre, Waterford
Attendance: 543
Referee: Jørgen Burchardt (Denmark)

=== Group D ===
Pos	Team	Pld	W	D	L	GF	GA	GD	Pts	Qualification
1	Italy	3	3	0	0	9	3	+6	9	Knockout stage
2	Spain	3	2	0	1	5	4	+1	6	Knockout stage
3	Germany	3	1	0	2	4	5	−1	3	
4	Austria	3	0	0	3	2	8	−6	0	

Source: UEFA
Rules for classification: Group stage tiebreakers
4 May 2019
16:00

Spain	3–0	Austria
Escobar 33'; Navarro 36'; Pino 41'	Report

Carlisle Grounds, Bray
Attendance: 2,611
Referee: Manfredas Lukjančukas (Lithuania)
4 May 2019
18:30

Germany	1–3	Italy
Beier 15'	Report	Bonfanti 27'; Esposito 81'; Giovane 90+4'

Tallaght Stadium, Dublin
Attendance: 1,203
Referee: Donald Robertson (Scotland)

7 May 2019
19:00

Spain	1–0	Germany
Moreno 78' (pen.)	Report

Waterford Regional Sports Centre, Waterford
Attendance: 1,221
Referee: Espen Eskås (Norway)
7 May 2019
19:00

Italy	2–1	Austria
Esposito 34' (pen.); Panada 79'	Report	Pross 89'

City Calling Stadium, Longford
Attendance: 623
Referee: Jørgen Burchardt (Denmark)

10 May 2019
19:00

Italy	4–1	Spain
Colombo 22' (pen.); Moretti 49'; Pirola 66'; Esposito 89' (pen.)	Report	Soriano 45'

UCD Bowl, Dublin
Attendance: 1,377
Referee: Rade Obrenović (Slovenia)
10 May 2019
19:00

Austria	1–3	Germany
Pehlivan 7'	Report	Obuz 48'; Samardzic 53' (pen.); Adeyemi 67'

Carlisle Grounds, Bray
Attendance: 1,737
Referee: Farrugia Cann Trustin (Malta)

== Knockout stage ==
In the knockout stage, penalty shoot-out is used to decide the winner if necessary (no extra time is played).

=== Bracket ===
Quarter-finals
12 May – Bray
Belgium	0
Netherlands	3
13 May – Dublin (UCD)
Hungary	1 (4)
Spain	1 (5)
12 May – Dublin (Tallaght)
France	6
Czech Republic	1
13 May – Dublin (Tolka)
Italy	1
Portugal	0

Semi-finals
16 May – Dublin (UCD)
Netherlands	1
Spain	0
16 May – Dublin (Tallaght)
France	1
Italy	2

Final
19 May – Dublin (Tallaght)
Netherlands	4
Italy	2
World Cup play-off
16 May – Dublin (Tolka)
Hungary	1 (5)
Belgium	1 (4)

=== Quarter-finals ===
Winners qualify for 2019 FIFA U-17 World Cup. The two best losing quarter-finalists enter the FIFA U-17 World Cup play-off.

12 May 2019
13:00

France	6–1	Czech Republic
Millot 30'; Aouchiche 36', 45+2', 75', 88' (pen.); Nsona 80'	Report	Ritter 90+5'

Tallaght Stadium, Dublin
Attendance: 670
Referee: Jørgen Burchardt (Denmark)

12 May 2019
19:00

Belgium	0–3	Netherlands
	Report	Hansen 27'; Salah-Eddine 40'; Hoever 74'

Carlisle Grounds, Bray
Attendance: 2,631
Referee: Rade Obrenović (Slovenia)

13 May 2019
16:30

Italy	1–0	Portugal
Tongya 26'	Report

Tolka Park, Dublin
Attendance: 734
Referee: Manfredas Lukjančukas (Lithuania)

13 May 2019
19:00

Hungary	1–1	Spain
Ominger 50'	Report	Escobar 11'
Penalties
Komáromi (penalty scored); Major (penalty scored); Ominger (penalty scored); Posztobányi (penalty scored); Németh (penalty missed)	4–5	(penalty scored) Valera; (penalty scored) Navarro; (penalty scored) Gómez; (penalty scored) Rico; (penalty scored) Moreno

UCD Bowl, Dublin
Attendance: 1,320
Referee: Farrugia Cann Trustin (Malta)

==== Ranking of losing quarter-finalists ====
To determine the two best losing quarter-finalists which enter the FIFA U-17 World Cup play-off, the losing quarter-finalists are ranked by the following criteria (Regulations Article 16.06):

1. Position in the group stage (i.e., group winners ahead of group runners-up);
2. Results in the group stage (i.e., points, goal difference, goals scored);
3. Results in the quarter-finals (i.e., points, goal difference, goals scored);
4. Disciplinary points in the group stage and quarter-finals combined;
5. UEFA coefficient for the qualifying round draw;
6. Drawing of lots.

Pos	Grp	Team	Pld	W	D	L	GF	GA	GD	Pts	Qualification
1	C1	Hungary	3	3	0	0	6	3	+3	9	FIFA U-17 World Cup play-off
2	A1	Belgium	3	1	2	0	5	2	+3	5	FIFA U-17 World Cup play-off
3	C2	Portugal	3	2	0	1	6	4	+2	6	
4	A2	Czech Republic	3	1	2	0	4	2	+2	5	

Source: UEFA

=== FIFA U-17 World Cup play-off ===
Winner qualifies for 2019 FIFA U-17 World Cup.

16 May 2019
12:00

Hungary	1–1	Belgium
Komáromi 61'	Report	Kalulika 56'
Penalties
Komáromi (penalty scored); Szalay (penalty scored); Molnár (penalty scored); Major (penalty scored); Zuigeber (penalty scored)	5–4	(penalty scored) Sardella; (penalty scored) Nizet; (penalty missed) De Wolf; (penalty scored) Baeten; (penalty scored) Doku

Tolka Park, Dublin
Attendance: 462
Referee: Krzysztof Jakubik (Poland)

=== Semi-finals ===
16 May 2019
16:30

Netherlands	1–0	Spain
Taabouni 89'	Report

UCD Bowl, Dublin
Attendance: 1,175
Referee: Donald Robertson (Scotland)

16 May 2019
19:00

France	1–2	Italy
Millot 41'	Report	Esposito 45+1'; Udogie 81'

Tallaght Stadium, Dublin
Attendance: 1,280
Referee: Mykola Balakin (Ukraine)

=== Final ===
19 May 2019
16:30

Netherlands	4–2	Italy
Hansen 20'; Bannis 37'; Maatsen 45'; Ünüvar 70'	Report	Colombo 56', 89'

Tallaght Stadium, Dublin
Attendance: 5,952
Referee: Espen Eskås (Norway)

== Goalscorers ==
There were 104 goals scored in 32 matches, for an average of 3.25 goals per match.

9 goals

- (France) Adil Aouchiche

4 goals

- (Italy) Sebastiano Esposito

3 goals

- (Belgium) Thibo Baeten
- (Belgium) Chris Kalulika
- (England) Sam Greenwood
- (Hungary) András Németh
- (Italy) Lorenzo Colombo
- (Netherlands) Brian Brobbey
- (Netherlands) Sontje Hansen

2 goals

- (Czech Republic) Václav Sejk
- (France) Enzo Millot
- (Iceland) Mikael Egill Ellertsson
- (Netherlands) Naoufal Bannis
- (Netherlands) Ian Maatsen
- (Netherlands) Naci Ünüvar
- (Russia) Ilya Golyatov
- (Spain) Jordi Escobar
- (Sweden) Anthony Elanga

1 goal

- (Austria) Deniz Pehlivan
- (Austria) Josef Pross
- (Czech Republic) David Pech
- (Czech Republic) Adam Ritter
- (England) Joe Gelhardt
- (England) Taylor Harwood-Bellis
- (England) Teddy Jenks
- (France) Nathanaël Mbuku
- (France) KKélian Nsona
- (France) Georginio Rutter
- (Germany) Karim Adeyemi
- (Germany) Maximilian Beier
- (Germany) Marvin Obuz
- (Germany) Lazar Samardzic
- (Greece) Dimitrios Arsenidis
- (Hungary) György Komáromi
- (Hungary) Márk Kosznovszky
- (Hungary) Sámuel Major
- (Hungary) Rajmund Molnár
- (Hungary) Gergő Ominger
- (Iceland) Jón Gísli Eyland Gíslason
- (Iceland) Andri Guðjohnsen
- (Iceland) Ísak Bergmann Jóhannesson
- (Italy) Nicholas Bonfanti
- (Italy) Samuel Giovane
- (Italy) Lorenzo Moretti
- (Italy) Simone Panada
- (Italy) Lorenzo Pirola
- (Italy) Franco Tongya
- (Italy) Destiny Udogie
- (Netherlands) Ki-Jana Hoever
- (Netherlands) Anass Salah-Eddine
- (Netherlands) Mohamed Taabouni
- (Portugal) Gonçalo Batalha
- (Portugal) Paulo Bernardo
- (Portugal) Filipe Cruz
- (Portugal) Fábio Silva
- (Portugal) Gerson Sousa
- (Portugal) Bruno Tavares
- (Republic of Ireland) Matt Everitt
- (Republic of Ireland) Andrew Omobamidele
- (Republic of Ireland) Timi Sobowale
- (Russia) Aslan Mutaliyev
- (Russia) Kirill Shchetinin
- (Russia) Egor Shapovalov
- (Spain) Pablo Moreno
- (Spain) Robert Navarro
- (Spain) Yeremy Pino
- (Spain) Mario Soriano
- (Sweden) Tim Prica

1 own goal

- (Belgium) Mathias De Wolf (against Czech Republic)
- (Russia) Andrei Savinov (against Iceland)

== Team of the tournament ==
The UEFA technical observers selected the following 11 players for the team of the tournament:

Goalkeeper	Defenders	Midfielders	Forward
(Netherlands) Calvin Raatsie	(Netherlands) Ki-Jana Hoever; (Italy) Lorenzo Pirola; (Netherlands) Melayro Bogarde; (France) Timothée Pembélé	(Italy) Simone Panada; (France) Lucien Agoumé; (France) Adil Aouchiche; (France) Enzo Millot; (Netherlands) Sontje Hansen	(Italy) Sebastiano Esposito

== Qualified teams for FIFA U-17 World Cup ==
The following five teams from UEFA qualify for the 2019 FIFA U-17 World Cup.

Team	Qualified on	Previous appearances in FIFA U-17 World Cup^{1}
France	12 May 2019	6 (1987, **2001**, 2007, 2011, 2015, 2017)
Netherlands	12 May 2019	3 (2005, 2009, 2011)
Italy	13 May 2019	7 (1985, 1987, 1991, 1993, 2005, 2009, 2013)
Spain	13 May 2019	9 (1991, 1995, 1997, 1999, 2001, 2003, 2007, 2009, 2017)
Hungary	16 May 2019	1 (1985)

^{1} Bold indicates champions for that year. Italic indicates hosts for that year

== International broadcasters ==
=== Television ===
21 of 32 live matches and highlights are available on UEFA.com and UEFA.tv YouTube channel for all territories around the world.

Note : Live matches on YouTube is not available in Republic of Ireland (host), Germany, Israel, MENA, and USA.

==== Participating nations ====
Country	Broadcaster
**Ireland (host)**	**RTÉ (English)**
**Ireland (host)**	**TG4 (Irish)**
Austria	ORF
Austria	Sport1
Germany	Sport1
Belgium	VRT (Dutch)
Belgium	RTBF (French)
Czech Republic	ČT
France	RMC Sport
Hungary	MTVA
Iceland	RÚV
Italy	RAI
Netherlands	NOS
Portugal	RTP
Russia	Match TV
Spain	RTVE
Sweden	SVT
Sweden	TV4
United Kingdom	BBC

==== Non-participating European nations ====
Country/Region	Broadcaster
Albania	RTSH
Andorra	RTVE (Spanish)
Andorra	RMC (French)
Luxembourg	RMC (French)
Luxembourg	RTBF (French)
Belarus	Belteleradio
Bosnia and Herzegovina; Croatia; Macedonia; Montenegro; Serbia; Slovenia	Sport Klub
Bulgaria	BNT
Denmark	DR; TV 2
Faroe Islands	DR; TV 2
Estonia	ERR
Finland	Yle
Israel	Charlton
Kosovo	RTK
Latvia	LTV
Liechtenstein	SRG SSR
Switzerland	SRG SSR
Lithuania	LRT
Malta	PBS
Norway	NRK
Norway	TV2
Poland	TVP
Romania	TVR
San Marino	RAI
Vatican City	RAI
Slovakia	RTVS
Ukraine	UA:PBC

==== Outside Europe ====
Country/Regional	Broadcaster
China	CCTV
Latin American countries: Argentina; Bolivia; Chile; Colombia; Costa Rica; Dominican Republic; Ecuador; El Salvador; Guatemala; Honduras; Mexico; Nicaragua; Panama; Paraguay; Peru; Puerto Rico; Uruguay; Venezuela	ESPN; Univision Deportes (Puerto Rico and USA only)
United States	ESPN; Univision Deportes (Puerto Rico and USA only)
MENA: Algeria; Bahrain; Chad; Comoros; Djibouti; Egypt; Iran; Iraq; Jordan; Kuwait; Lebanon; Libya; Mauritania; Morocco; Oman; Qatar; Saudi Arabia; Somalia; Palestine; Sudan; Syria; Tunisia; United Arab Emirates; Yemen	beIN Sports

=== Radio ===
==== Participating nations ====
Country	Broadcaster
**Ireland (host)**	**RTÉ (English and Irish)**
Austria	ORF
Belgium	VRT (Dutch)
Belgium	RTBF (French)
Czech Republic	ČR
France	Radio France
France	RFI
France	Europe 1
Hungary	MTVA
Iceland	RÚV
Italy	RAI
Netherlands	NOS
Portugal	RTP
Spain	RTVE
Spain	COPE
Spain	SER
Sweden	SR
United Kingdom	BBC

==== Non-participating European nations ====
Country/Region	Broadcaster
Albania	RTSH
Andorra	RTVE (Spanish)
Andorra	COPE (Spanish)
Andorra	SER (Spanish)
Andorra	RTVA (Catalan)
Andorra	RFI (French)
Luxembourg	RFI (French)
Luxembourg	RTBF (French)
Luxembourg	Radio 100,7 (Luxembourgish)
Belarus	Belteleradio
Bulgaria	BNR
Denmark	DR
Estonia	ERR
Finland	Yle
Kosovo	RTK
Latvia	LR
Liechtenstein	SRG SSR
Switzerland	SRG SSR
Lithuania	LRT
Malta	PBS
Norway	NRK
Poland	PR
Romania	ROR
San Marino	RAI
Vatican City	RAI
Slovakia	RTVS
Ukraine	UA:PBC
