= Danila Kalin =

Russian footballer

Personal information
- Full name: Danila Igorevich Kalin
- Date of birth: 29 June 2002 (age 24)
- Height: 1.85 m (6 ft 1 in)
- Position: Centre-back

Team information
- Current team: Shakhtyor Donetsk
- Number: 3

Youth career
- 2020–2022: Khimki

Senior career*
Years	Team	Apps	(Gls)
2019–2023	Khimki-M	54	(3)
2023	Khimki	1	(0)
2023	Krasnoye Znamya Noginsk	2	(0)
2023–2025	Tekstilshchik Ivanovo	36	(1)
2025	Zenit-2 Saint Petersburg	5	(0)
2026	Dynamo Vologda	13	(0)
2026–	Shakhtyor Donetsk	2	(0)
- * Club domestic league appearances and goals as of 31 October 2026

Danila Igorevich Kalin (Russian: Данила Игоревич Калин; born 29 June 2002) is a Russian professional football player who plays as a centre-back for Shakhtyor Donetsk.

== Career ==
He made his debut in the Russian Premier League for Khimki on 3 June 2023 in a game against Pari NN.

== Honours ==
Zenit-2 Saint Petersburg

- Russian Second League Division B: 2025
