= Anton Orlov =

Russian footballer

Personal information
- Full name: Anton Vasilyevich Orlov
- Date of birth: 1 June 1997 (age 29)
- Place of birth: Novosibirsk, Russia
- Height: 1.80 m (5 ft 11 in)
- Position: Midfielder

Team information
- Current team: Shakhtyor Donetsk
- Number: 77

Youth career
- Sibir Novosibirsk

Senior career*
Years	Team	Apps	(Gls)
2013–2014	LFK Rubin Kazan		
2015–2016	Sibir-2 Novosibirsk	24	(1)
2017–2018	Nosta Novotroitsk	27	(2)
2018–2020	Mordovia Saransk	43	(2)
2021	Kuban Krasnodar	10	(1)
2021–2023	Chayka Peschanokopskoye	44	(12)
2023–2024	Yenisey Krasnoyarsk	8	(1)
2024	Sibir Novosibirsk	13	(2)
2025–2026	Kuban Krasnodar	25	(1)
2026–	Shakhtyor Donetsk	19	(2)
- * Club domestic league appearances and goals as of 31 October 2026

Anton Vasilyevich Orlov (Russian: Антон Васильевич Орлов; born 1 June 1997) is a Russian professional football player who plays for Shakhtyor Donetsk.

== Club career ==
Orlov made his debut in the Russian Professional Football League for Sibir-2 Novosibirsk on 22 April 2015 in a game against Metallurg Novokuznetsk. He made his debut for the senior squad of Sibir Novosibirsk on 26 August 2015 in a Russian Cup game against Nosta Novotroitsk.

He made his Russian Football National League debut for Mordovia Saransk on 22 July 2018 in a game against Armavir.
