= Yaroslav Kotlyarov =

Ukrainian footballer

Personal information
- Full name: Yaroslav Ihorovych Kotlyarov
- Date of birth: 19 November 1997 (age 28)
- Place of birth: Yenakiieve, Ukraine
- Height: 1.91 m (6 ft 3 in)
- Position: Goalkeeper

Team information
- Current team: Shakhtyor Donetsk
- Number: 1

Youth career
- 2009–2014: Olimpik Donetsk

Senior career*
Years	Team	Apps	(Gls)
2014–2018	Olimpik Donetsk	5	(0)
2017	→ Helios Kharkiv (loan)	5	(0)
2018	→ Sudnobudivnyk Mykolaiv (loan)	6	(0)
2018–2019	Kremin Kremenchuk	27	(0)
2019	Volyn Lutsk	1	(0)
2020–2022	Metalurh Zaporizhya	46	(0)
2022–2025	Kolkheti-1913	75	(0)
2025–2026	Gonio	13	(0)
2026–	Shakhtyor Donetsk	9	(0)
- * Club domestic league appearances and goals as of 31 October 2026

Yaroslav Ihorovych Kotlyarov (Ukrainian: Ярослав Ігорович Котляров; born 19 November 1997) is a Ukrainian and Russian professional footballer who plays as a goalkeeper for Shakhtyor Donetsk.

== Club career ==
Kotlyarov is a product of the FC Olimpik Sportive Academy and was promoted to the main squad team in April 2014. He made his debut on 18 May 2014 in a match against FC Avanhard Kramatorsk in the Ukrainian First League.

With Olimpik he won the 2013–14 Ukrainian First League and got promotion to the Ukrainian Premier League.
