= Baptiste Gabard =

French footballer (born 2000)

Personal information
- Date of birth: 28 January 2000 (age 26)
- Place of birth: Saint-Étienne, France
- Height: 1.85 m (6 ft 1 in)
- Position: Midfielder

Team information
- Current team: Entente Crest-Aouste

Youth career
- ES Veauche
- 2009–2019: Saint-Étienne

Senior career*
Years	Team	Apps	(Gls)
2019–2023	Saint-Étienne B	33	(4)
2021	Saint-Étienne	2	(0)
2023–2024	Andrézieux	1	(0)
2024–2026	Hauts Lyonnais	4	(0)
2026–	Entente Crest-Aouste	0	(0)
- * Club domestic league appearances and goals as of 31 August 2026

Baptiste Gabard (born 28 January 2000) is a French professional footballer who plays as a midfielder for Championnat National 3 club Hauts Lyonnais.

== Early life ==
Gabard first started playing football in Veauche, Loire, before joining Saint-Étienne in 2009.

== Club career ==
Having won the Coupe Gambardella in 2019 with the William Saliba and Wesley Fofana generation, Gabard later became a regular in Saint-Étienne's National 2 and National 3 reserve team, he signed his first professional contract with the club in December 2020.

He made his professional debut for Saint-Étienne under Claude Puel on 17 January 2021, starting in a 1–0 away Ligue 1 loss to Strasbourg. He went on to also start in the following league game, a home Derby rhônalpin game against Lyon, a dream come true for the young ASSE supporter, despite the absence of public due to the covid restrictions.

However Gabard did not play any other game with the first team, being sidelined with injuries and then going back with the reserves, before leaving Saint-Étienne in 2023.

His career then continued in Rhône-Alpes, between national and regional competitions, in Andrézieux, Hauts Lyonnais and in 2026 Crest.
