= Kazanskaya, Rostov Oblast =

Kazanskaya Казанская
- Stanitsa
- Interactive map of Kazanskaya
- Location of Kazanskaya Kazanskaya (Rostov Oblast)
- Coordinates: 49°48′00″N 41°08′08″E
- Country: Russia
- Federal subject: Rostov Oblast
- Administrative district: Verkhnedonskoy District

Population (2010 Census)
  - Total: 4,721
  - Estimate (2010): 4,721 (0%)
- Time zone: UTC+3 (MSK)
- Postal code: 346170
- OKTMO ID: 60608412101

Kazanskaya (Russian: Казанская) is a rural locality (a stanitsa) in Verkhnedonskoy District of Rostov Oblast, Russia, located on the left bank of Don River 360 kilometers (220 mi) from Rostov-on-Don. Population: 4,721 (2010 census); 4,954 (2002 census). It is also the administrative center of Verkhnedonskoy District.

== Geography ==
It is situated in northern part of Rostov Oblast on the left bank of Don River close to Vyoshenskaya stanitsa and border with Voronezh Oblast.

== History ==
А map of Southern Russia from Isaac Massa's book printed in 1638 indicates a crossing of the Don river called Casanski Perevoos (Russian: Казанский перевоз, lit. Kazan crossing) on the place of the present settlement. This was probably a crossing on a road from the Don Host to the city of Kazan.

An explorer of the Don Host Oblast and an envoy of Peter I Rigelman referred to the village as being established in 1647. After the victory of Tsar Ivan the Terrible over the Kazan Khanate, where the Cossacks played a key role, he granted them Don lands. These territories were rich in fisheries, with agriculture, viticulture, and trade also being developed rapidly.

In 1690, on the recommendation of Peter I, the Cossacks decided to move their settlement upstream along the Don. Yet at its present place the stanitsa of Kazanskaya was settled only in 1740. It is one of the oldest settlements in Don region.

Kazanskaya was part of Donetsky District of Don Host Oblast.

== Places of interest ==
- Kazanskaya museum of local history
- Church of the Holy Trinity, a Russian Orthodox church built in 1914.
