= Abdoulaye Sidibé =

French footballer (born 2002)

Personal information
- Date of birth: 9 February 2002 (age 24)
- Place of birth: Paris, France
- Height: 1.80 m (5 ft 11 in)
- Position: Winger

Team information
- Current team: Saint-Étienne II

Youth career
- 2010–2017: Montfermeil
- 2017–2018: Saint-Étienne

Senior career*
Years	Team	Apps	(Gls)
2018–	Saint-Étienne II	11	(0)
2020–2021	Saint-Étienne	1	(0)

International career
2018–2019	France U18	5	(1)
- * Club domestic league appearances and goals as of 22:19, 20 September 2020 (UTC)

Abdoulaye Sidibé (born 9 February 2002) is a French professional footballer who plays as a winger for ligue 2 side AS Saint-Étienne.

== Club career ==
On 1 July 2019, Sidibé signed his first professional contract with Saint-Étienne. He made his professional debut with Saint-Étienne in a 2–2 Ligue 1 tie with FC Nantes on 20 September 2020.

== International career ==
Born in France, Sidibé is of Senegalese descent. He is a youth international for France.
