= Oktyabrsky, Vladimir Oblast =

Oktyabrsky Октябрьский
- Settlement
- Location within Vladimir Oblast Location within Russia
- Coordinates: 56°13′N 42°02′E
- Country: Russia
- Region: Vladimir Oblast
- District: Vyaznikovsky District
- Time zone: UTC+3:00

Oktyabrsky (Russian: Октя́брьский) is a rural locality (a settlement) and the administrative center of Oktyabrskoye Rural Settlement, Vyaznikovsky District, Vladimir Oblast, Russia. The population was 2,017 as of 2010. There are 17 streets.

== Geography ==
Oktyabrsky is located 11 km west of Vyazniki (the district's administrative centre) by road. Senkovo is the nearest rural locality.
