= Ruslan Suanov (footballer, born 1997) =

Russian footballer

Personal information
- Full name: Ruslan Ruslanovich Suanov
- Date of birth: 13 October 1997 (age 29)
- Place of birth: Vladikavkaz, Russia
- Height: 1.90 m (6 ft 3 in)
- Position: Forward

Team information
- Current team: Shakhtyor Donetsk
- Number: 9

Youth career
- –2012: Konoplyov football academy
- 2013–2014: Dynamo Moscow
- 2015–2016: Zenit St. Petersburg

Senior career*
Years	Team	Apps	(Gls)
2016	Zenit St. Petersburg	0	(0)
2016	Zenit-2 St. Petersburg	3	(0)
2017	Lada-Tolyatti	22	(0)
2018	Spartak Vladikavkaz	14	(2)
2019–2021	Alania Vladikavkaz	24	(0)
2021	Alania-2 Vladikavkaz	0	(0)
2021–2022	Rubin Yalta	7	(5)
2022	Dynamo Bryansk	9	(0)
2022–2023	Dynamo Stavropol	22	(10)
2023–2024	Mashuk-KMV Pyatigorsk	50	(10)
2025	Nart Cherkessk	19	(3)
2025	Dynamo Stavropol	12	(3)
2026–	Shakhtyor Donetsk	26	(8)

International career
2012	Russia U-15	1	(0)
2015	Russia U-18	2	(0)
- * Club domestic league appearances and goals as of 31 October 2026

Ruslan Ruslanovich Suanov (Russian: Руслан Русланович Суанов; born 13 October 1997) is a Russian professional football player who plays for Shakhtyor Donetsk.

== Club career ==
He made his debut in the Russian Football National League for Zenit-2 St. Petersburg on 10 May 2016 in a game against Fakel Voronezh.

== Personal ==
His father, also called Ruslan Suanov, also was a professional footballer.
