= Ruslan Suanov (footballer, born 1975) =

Russian footballer

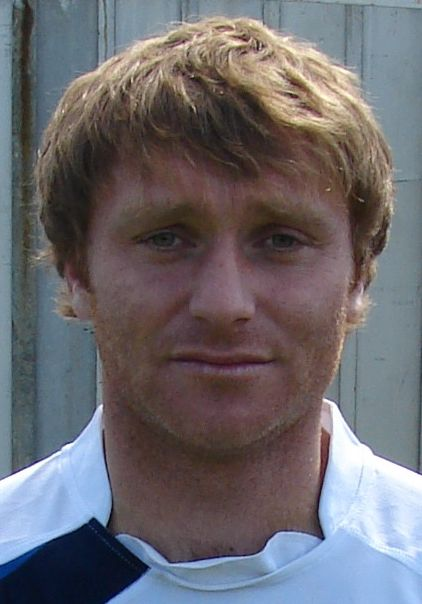

Personal information
- Full name: Ruslan Ruslanovich Suanov
- Date of birth: 18 June 1975 (age 51)
- Place of birth: Ordzhonikidze, Russian SFSR
- Height: 1.77 m (5 ft 9 1/2 in)
- Position: Forward

Senior career*
Years	Team	Apps	(Gls)
1991–1994	FC Spartak Vladikavkaz	16	(2)
1995–1996	FC Zhemchuzhina Sochi	42	(5)
1996	FC Energia-Tekstilshchik Kamyshin	18	(4)
1997	FC Zhemchuzhina Sochi	10	(1)
1997	FC Metallurg Lipetsk	13	(3)
1998	FC Kuban Krasnodar	18	(6)
1999	FC Zhemchuzhina Sochi	21	(1)
2000	FC Lokomotiv St. Petersburg	16	(4)
2000	FC Volgar-Gazprom Astrakhan	10	(0)
2001	FC Lokomotiv Nizhny Novgorod	31	(7)
2002–2003	FC Baltika Kaliningrad	43	(36)
2003	FC Arsenal Tula	11	(1)
2004	FC Metalurh Zaporizhya	5	(0)
2005	FC Arsenal Tula	15	(3)
2005	FC Lokomotiv-NN Nizhny Novgorod	14	(9)
2006	FC Spartak Kostroma	32	(21)
2007	FC Dynamo St. Petersburg	17	(7)
2007–2008	FC Sportakademklub Moscow	16	(7)
2009	FC Avtodor Vladikavkaz	1	(0)

Managerial career
- 2009: FC Avtodor Vladikavkaz (assistant)
- 2011–2012: FC Alania-d Vladikavkaz (administrator)
- 2012: FC Alania-d Vladikavkaz
- * Club domestic league appearances and goals

Ruslan Ruslanovich Suanov (Russian: Руслан Русланович Суанов; born 18 June 1975) is a Russian retired professional footballer. He made his debut in the Russian Premier League in 1992 for FC Spartak Vladikavkaz.

His son, also called Ruslan Suanov, is now a footballer as well.

His father, also called Ruslan Suanov, was footballer.

== Honours ==
- Russian Premier League runner-up: 1992.
- Russian Second Division Zone West top scorer: 2002 (35 goals), 2006 (21 goals).
